= Miami Dolphins all-time roster =

1,434 players have appeared in at least one regular season or postseason game in the National Football League (NFL) or American Football League (AFL) for the Miami Dolphins since 1966. This list is accurate through the end of the 2025 NFL season.

== A ==
- Isaako Aaitui
- Karim Abdul-Jabbar
- Isa Abdul-Quddus
- De'Von Achane
- Keith Adams
- Stefon Adams
- Tucker Addington
- Chidi Ahanotu
- Salvon Ahmed
- Dave Ahrens
- Walt Aikens
- Jay Ajayi
- Anthony Alabi
- Ikaika Alama-Francis
- Branden Albert
- Ethan Albright
- Bruce Alexander
- Gerald Alexander
- John Alexander
- Andy Alleman
- Chase Allen
- Jason Allen
- Jeff Allen
- Nate Allen
- Will Allen
- Kiko Alonso
- Jonathan Amaya
- Danny Amendola
- Bennie Anderson
- Charlie Anderson
- Dick Anderson
- Dunstan Anderson
- Terry Anderson
- Troy Andrew
- John Andrews
- Stephone Anthony
- Eli Apple
- David Arkin
- Terron Armstead
- Anthony Armstrong
- Antonio Armstrong
- Cornell Armstrong
- Trace Armstrong
- Jim Arnold
- Isaac Asiata
- Gene Atkins
- Joe Auer
- Marvin Austin
- John Avery
- Brendon Ayanbadejo
- Obafemi Ayanbadejo
- Akin Ayodele

== B ==
- Charlie Babb
- Ted Bachman
- Johnson Bademosi
- Clarence Bailey
- Elmer Bailey
- Jake Bailey
- Robert Bailey
- Chris Baker
- Jerome Baker
- Melvin Baker
- Robert Baker
- Ryan Baker
- Larry Ball
- Kalen Ballage
- Fred Banks
- Bruce Bannon
- Kantroy Barber
- Rudy Barber
- Carl Barisich
- Darian Barnes
- Rodrigo Barnes
- Bill Barnett
- Fred Barnett
- Brent Bartholomew
- Greg Baty
- Charlie Baumann
- Bob Baumhower
- Bill Bealles
- Doug Beaudoin
- Aubrey Beavers
- John Beck
- Odell Beckham Jr.
- Willie Beecher
- Tom Beier
- Quinton Bell
- Yeremiah Bell
- Ronald Bellamy
- Guy Benjamin
- Charles Bennett
- Woody Bennett
- Charles Benson
- Joe Berger
- Braxton Berrios
- Davone Bess
- Don Bessillieu
- Justin Bethel
- Doug Betters
- Vince Biegel
- Zeek Biggers
- Armon Binns
- Richard Bishop
- Glenn Blackwood
- Lyle Blackwood
- John Bock
- Evan Boehm
- Kim Bokamper
- Ned Bolcar
- Brandon Bolden
- Ethan Bonner
- Lorenzo Booker
- Marty Booker
- Larry Borom
- John Bosa
- Wade Bosarge
- David Boston
- Tommy Boutwell
- Lynn Bowden Jr.
- David Bowens
- Tim Bowens
- Zack Bowman
- Charles Bowser
- Tyus Bowser
- Brant Boyer
- Tim Boyle
- John Boynton
- Stephen Braggs
- John Bramlett
- Andre Branch
- Mel Branch
- Jim Braxton
- Tyrone Braxton
- Matt Breida
- Jake Brendel
- Sam Brenner
- Julius Brents
- Aaron Brewer
- Teddy Bridgewater
- O. J. Brigance
- Lamont Brightful
- Marlin Briscoe
- Jacoby Brissett
- K.J. Britt
- Lorenzo Bromell
- Josiah Bronson
- Chris Brooks
- Jordyn Brooks
- Nate Brooks
- Jay Brophy
- Andre Brown
- Bud Brown
- Dean Brown
- Donald Brown
- Evan Brown
- J. B. Brown
- James Brown
- Malcolm Brown
- Mark Brown
- Ronnie Brown
- Tom Brown
- Claude Brownlee
- Bob Brudzinski
- Bob Bruggers
- Daniel Brunskill
- Courtney Bryan
- Anthony Bryant
- Matt Bryant
- Tony Bua
- Jeff Buckey
- Terrell Buckley
- Norm Bulaich
- Chuck Bullough
- Nick Buoniconti
- Fernanza Burgess
- Marvell Burgess
- Kevin Burnett
- Rob Burnett
- Shane Burton
- Reggie Bush
- Jermon Bushrod
- Adam Butler
- Brice Butler
- Donald Butler
- Matthew Butler
- Keith Byars

== C ==
- Shaq Calhoun
- Antonio Callaway
- Greg Camarillo
- Jordan Cameron
- Calais Campbell
- D. J. Campbell
- Elijah Campbell
- Whit Canale
- Joe Cardona
- Vernon Carey
- Darryl Carlton
- Jackson Carman
- Brett Carolan
- Bobby Carpenter
- Dan Carpenter
- Preston Carpenter
- Cornellius Carradine
- Nolan Carroll
- Leonte Carroo
- Cethan Carter
- Cris Carter
- Joe Carter
- Kevin Carter
- Rick Casares
- Mike Caterbone
- Jimmy Cefalo
- William Cesare
- Mike Chalenski
- Chris Chambers
- Rusty Chambers
- Mike Charles
- Taco Charlton
- Jesse Chatman
- Laz Chavez
- Eddie Chavis
- Louis Cheek
- Chimdi Chekwa
- John Chesley
- George Chesser
- Larry Chester
- Robbie Chosen
- Bradley Chubb
- Tyson Clabo
- Jack Clancy
- Sean Clancy
- Desmond Clark
- Gary Clark
- Greg Clark
- Robert Clark
- Steve Clark
- Charles Clay
- Chase Claypool
- Mark Clayton
- Chris Clemons
- Greg Cleveland
- Jackie Cline
- Tyler Clutts
- Patrick Cobbs
- Michael Coe
- Adrian Colbert
- Jordan Colbert
- Terry Cole
- Deandre Coleman
- Justin Coleman
- Larnel Coleman
- Marco Coleman
- Daryn Colledge
- Cecil Collins
- Roosevelt Collins
- Tony Collins
- Marc Colombo
- Neal Colzie
- Brannon Condren
- Chris Conlin
- Tanner Conner
- Ryan Cook
- Ed Cooke
- Louis Cooper
- Horace Copeland
- Quinton Coples
- Charles Cornelius
- Frank Cornish Jr.
- Lester Cotton
- Terry Cousin
- Larry Cowan
- Arthur Cox
- Bryan Cox
- Chandler Cox
- Jim Cox
- River Cracraft
- Casey Cramer
- Aaron Craver
- James Crawford
- Mike Crawford
- Xavier Crawford
- Ken Crawley
- Joe Cribbs
- Chris Crocker
- Bill Cronin
- Jeff Cross
- Keion Crossen
- Channing Crowder
- Randy Crowder
- Doug Crusan
- Larry Csonka
- Daunte Culpepper
- Tyrone Culver
- Mike Current
- Kevin Curtis
- Jay Cutler

== D ==
- James Daniels
- Travis Daniels
- Karlos Dansby
- Kirby Dar Dar
- Donovin Darius
- Orleans Darkwa
- Bill Darnall
- Matt Darr
- Julién Davenport
- Ron Davenport
- Ashtyn Davis
- Gary Davis
- Jalen Davis
- Jamal Davis II
- Javaris Davis
- Jesse Davis
- Raekwon Davis
- Ted Davis
- Trevor Davis
- Vontae Davis
- Will Davis
- Steve DeBerg
- Michael Deiter
- Jim Del Gaizo
- Jeff Dellenbach
- Louis Delmas
- Bob DeMarco
- Vern Den Herder
- Mark Dennard
- Mike Dennery
- John Denney
- Mark Dennis
- Autry Denson
- A. J. Derby
- Lorenzo Diamond
- Rich Diana
- Matt Dickerson
- Cal Dixon
- Mark Dixon
- Tim Dobbins
- Tyrel Dodson
- Andrew Donnal
- Kevin Donnalley
- Thom Dornbrook
- Al Dotson
- DeWayne Dotson
- Lionel Dotson
- Jamil Douglas
- Leland Douglas
- Rasul Douglas
- Todd Doxzon
- Kenyan Drake
- Troy Drayton
- Tom Drougas
- Thomas Duarte
- Grant DuBose
- Storm Duck
- A. J. Duhe
- Greg Dulcich
- Jim Dunaway
- Mark Duper
- Rick Dvorak
- Deon Dyer

== E ==
- Doug Easlick
- Chase Edmonds
- Ferrell Edmunds
- Randy Edmunds
- Antuan Edwards
- Robert Edwards
- Michael Egnew
- Samuel Eguavoen
- Liam Eichenberg
- Bruce Elia
- Dannell Ellerbe
- DeShon Elliott
- Craig Ellis
- Ken Ellis
- Bert Emanuel
- Frank Emanuel
- Steve Emtman
- Alonzo Ephraim
- Dedrick Epps
- Craig Erickson
- Tom Erlandson
- D'Wayne Eskridge
- Darrynton Evans
- Fred Evans
- Heath Evans
- Norm Evans
- Quinn Ewers
- Erik Ezukanma

== F ==
- Nuu Faaola
- Earl Faison
- David Fales
- Dale Farley
- George Farmer
- Neil Farrell Jr.
- Anthony Fasano
- Terrence Fede
- A. J. Feeley
- Jay Feely
- Ray Feinga
- Clayton Fejedelem
- Todd Feldman
- Blake Ferguson
- Jason Ferguson
- Manny Fernandez
- Jay Fiedler
- Brandon Fields
- Steve Fifita
- Cortland Finnegan
- Minkah Fitzpatrick
- Ryan Fitzpatrick
- Marv Fleming
- Ronald Flemons
- Jamar Fletcher
- Ereck Flowers
- Trey Flowers
- Andre Fluellen
- Spencer Folau
- Tim Foley
- J. D. Folsom
- Toniu Fonoti
- Isaiah Ford
- Brock Forsey
- Arian Foster
- Jerome Foster
- Roy Foster
- Charlie Fowler
- Dennis Fowlkes
- Jason Fox
- Dion Foxx
- A. J. Francis
- Andra Franklin
- Tony Franklin
- Andrew Franks
- Kavon Frazier
- Arturo Freeman
- Jonathan Freeny
- Gus Frerotte
- Irving Fryar
- Brandon Frye
- David Frye
- Kendall Fuller
- Will Fuller
- Mike Fultz
- Tom Funchess
- Tony Furjanic

== G ==
- Samkon Gado
- Oronde Gadsden
- Jabar Gaffney
- Chris Gaines
- William Gaines
- Harry Galbreath
- Scott Galyon
- Trent Gamble
- Daryl Gardener
- Andrew Gardner
- Donnie Gardner
- Nate Garner
- Cleveland Gary
- Shamiel Gary
- Myles Gaskin
- Clyde Gates
- Willie Gay
- Akbar Gbaja-Biamila
- Clifton Geathers
- Mike Gesicki
- Nick Giaquinto
- Brandon Gibson
- Ernest Gibson
- Jon Giesler
- Cookie Gilchrist
- Mike Gillislee
- Bryan Gilmore
- Jim Gilmore
- Hubert Ginn
- Ted Ginn Jr.
- Jason Glenn
- Kerry Glenn
- Davon Godchaux
- Kevin Gogan
- Mike Golic
- Cameron Goode
- Irv Goode
- Kerry Goode
- Tom Goode
- André Goodman
- Hunter Goodwin
- Lamar Gordon
- Larry Gordon
- Ollie Gordon II
- Frank Gore
- Stacy Gore
- Garry Grady
- Rick Graf
- Shayne Graham
- Bill Gramática
- African Grant
- Ernest Grant
- Jakeem Grant
- Kenneth Grant
- Jeff Grau
- Chris Gray
- Jonas Gray
- MarQueis Gray
- A. J. Green
- Chris Green
- Cleveland Green
- Eric Green
- Hugh Green
- Ray Green
- Trent Green
- Yatil Green
- Andrew Greene
- Morlon Greenwood
- Damian Gregory
- Bob Griese
- Brian Griese
- David Griggs
- Boomer Grigsby
- Brent Grimes
- John Grimsley
- Jeff Groth
- Jake Grove
- Kamu Grugier-Hill

== H ==
- Matt Haack
- Rex Hadnot
- Derek Hagan
- Jermaine Haley
- Aaron Halterman
- Michael Hamilton
- Kim Hammond
- Lorenzo Hampton
- Da'Shawn Hand
- Norman Hand
- Bobby Harden
- Bruce Hardy
- Jack Harper
- Joey Harrington
- Al Harris
- Anthony Harris
- Charles Harris
- Corey Harris
- Duriel Harris
- Leroy Harris
- Trent Harris
- Tuff Harris
- Jonotthan Harrison
- Lloyd Harrison
- Montre Hartage
- Brian Hartline
- Dale Hatcher
- Ed Hawthorne
- Jeff Hayes
- Ryan Hayes
- Tae Hayes
- William Hayes
- Abner Haynes
- Joey Haynos
- Matt Hazel
- Clayton Heath
- T. J. Heath
- Vince Heflin
- Bob Heinz
- Ron Heller
- Will Heller
- Andy Hendel
- Tommy Hendricks
- A. J. Hendy
- Chad Henne
- Charles Henry
- Leonard Henry
- Ron Hester
- Neville Hewitt
- Jim Higgins
- Mark Higgs
- Barry Hill
- Eddie Hill
- Ike Hill
- Julian Hill
- Nate Hill
- Randal Hill
- Ray Hill
- Renaldo Hill
- Sean Hill
- Tyreek Hill
- Lex Hilliard
- Jim Hines
- Liffort Hobley
- Jevon Holland
- Nate Holley
- Vonnie Holliday
- Dwight Hollier
- Mack Hollins
- Alex Holmes
- Johnny Holmes
- Mike Holmes
- Ziggy Hood
- Trell Hooper
- Houston Hoover
- Jerry Hopkins
- Gator Hoskins
- Justin Houston
- Jordan Howard
- Reggie Howard
- Xavien Howard
- Mike Howell
- Steve Howell
- Damon Huard
- Mike Hudock
- Mike Hull
- Bobby Humphrey
- Jack Hunt
- Robert Hunt
- Billy Hunter
- Jeff Hunter
- Justin Hunter
- Tyler Huntley
- Allen Hurns
- Tom Hutton

== I ==
- Mike Iaquaniello
- Noah Igbinoghene
- Richie Incognito
- Alec Ingold
- Mark Ingram Sr.
- Melvin Ingram
- Bruce Irvin
- Mark Irvin
- Heath Irwin
- Tim Irwin
- Danny Isidora
- Qadry Ismail
- Rickey Isom
- Larry Izzo

== J ==
- Austin Jackson
- Calvin Jackson
- Eddie Jackson
- Frank Jackson
- Keith Jackson
- Tyoka Jackson
- Vestee Jackson
- Ray Jacobs
- Tim Jacobs
- Steve Jacobson
- Kendyl Jacox
- Nate Jacquet
- Ja'Wuan James
- Jeno James
- LaMichael James
- Pete Jaquess
- Ilia Jarostchuk
- Ron Jaworski
- Greg Jeffries
- Al Jenkins
- Corey Jenkins
- Ed Jenkins
- Jelani Jenkins
- John Jenkins
- Gary Jennings Jr
- Greg Jennings
- Jim Jensen
- Greg Jerman
- John Jerry
- Billy Joe
- Ulrick John
- Al Johnson
- Albert Johnson
- Anthony Johnson
- Caleb Johnson
- Curtis Johnson
- Dan Johnson
- Demetrious Johnson
- Duke Johnson
- Greg Johnson
- Isaiah Johnson
- J. J. Johnson
- James-Michael Johnson
- Larry Johnson
- Micah Johnson
- Pat Johnson
- Pete Johnson
- Wesley Johnson
- Aaron Jones
- Benito Jones
- Brandon Jones
- Byron Jones
- Chris Jones
- Dominique Jones
- Don Jones
- Donnie Jones
- Jack Jones
- Jason Jones
- Nate Jones
- Ray Jones
- Reshad Jones
- Robert Jones (born 1969)
- Robert Jones (born 1999)
- Tebucky Jones
- Charles Jordan
- Dion Jordan
- Kelvin Joseph
- Bob Joswick
- Ed Judie
- Matthew Judon
- William Judson
- E. J. Junior

== K ==
- Josh Kaddu
- Nate Kaeding
- Mohamed Kamara
- Ted Karras
- Bill Keating
- Scott Kehoe
- Ben Kelly
- Marcus Kemp
- William Kershaw
- Jimmy Keyes
- John Kidd
- Jim Kiick
- Daniel Kilgore
- Brian Kinchen
- Howard Kindig
- Solomon Kindley
- Vick King
- Terry Kirby
- Jim Kitts
- Chuck Klingbeil
- Sammy Knight
- Jake Knott
- Greg Koch
- Dave Kocourek
- Kader Kohou
- Mike Kolen
- Larry Kolic
- Mark Konecny
- Rob Konrad
- Jeff Kopp
- Bernie Kosar
- Jordan Kovacs
- Mike Kozlowski
- Barry Krauss
- Karl Kremser
- Tyler Kroft
- Bob Kuechenberg
- Eric Kumerow

== L ==
- Eric Laakso
- Deon Lacey
- Patrick Laird
- Mack Lamb
- Mike Lambrecht
- Kendall Lamm
- Chris Lammons
- Mel Land
- Jarvis Landry
- Jorvorskie Lane
- Jim Langer
- Kendall Langford
- Paul Lankford
- Ted Larsen
- Shaq Lawson
- Jonathan Ledbetter
- Donald Lee
- Larry Lee
- Ronnie Lee
- Shawn Lee
- Michael Lehan
- Charles Leigh
- Norman LeJeune
- Cory Lekkerkerker
- Cleo Lemon
- Zebbie Lethridge
- David Lewis
- Ryan Lewis
- Tommylee Lewis
- Brody Liddiard
- Garrett Limbrick
- Phillip Lindsay
- Jeff Linkenbach
- Tony Lippett
- George Little
- Greg Little
- Larry Little
- Chris Liwienski
- Frank Lockett
- Marc Logan
- Brandon London
- David Long Jr.
- Hunter Long
- Jake Long
- J. P. Losman
- Billy Lothridge
- Omare Lowe
- Steve Lubischer
- Jordan Lucas
- Ray Lucas
- Henry Lusk
- Booth Lusteg

== M ==
- Kyle Mackey
- Sam Madison
- Benny Malone
- Darrell Malone
- Cameron Malveaux
- Greg Mancz
- Jim Mandich
- Brian Manning
- Justin March
- Olindo Mare
- Dan Marino
- Brock Marion
- Greg Mark
- Doug Marrone
- Brandon Marshall
- David Marshall
- Jason Marshall Jr.
- Richard Marshall
- David Martin
- Jamar Martin
- Jonathan Martin
- Tony Martin
- Vaughn Martin
- Wayne Mass
- Tim Massaquoi
- Jeron Mastrud
- Bob Matheson
- Evan Mathis
- Bo Matthews
- Rishard Matthews
- Wes Matthews
- Rey Maualuga
- Carl Mauck
- Reagan Maui'a
- Byron Maxwell
- Jim Maxwell
- Marcus Maye
- Norm McBride
- Bobby McCain
- Brice McCain
- Chris McCain
- Bryan McCann
- Matt McChesney
- Jacques McClendon
- Jason McCourty
- Kelcie McCray
- Loaird McCreary
- Dale McCullers
- Tony McDaniel
- Wahoo McDaniel
- Sean McDermott
- T. J. McDonald
- Stockar McDougle
- O. J. McDuffie
- Tanner McEvoy
- Jim McFarland
- Scott McGarrahan
- John McGeever
- Mike McGruder
- Dan McGwire
- Tom McHale
- Damion McIntosh
- Everett McIver
- Kevin McKenzie
- Verone McKinley
- Seth McKinney
- Bryant McKinnie
- James McKnight
- Tim McKyer
- Derrick McLendon
- Randy McMichael
- Raekwon McMillan
- Patrick McMorris
- Don McNeal
- Jerris McPhail
- Jake McQuaide
- Pat McQuistan
- Torry McTyer
- Richard Medlin
- Ifeatu Melifonwu
- Phillip Merling
- Dave Merritt
- Kirk Merritt
- Jim Mertens
- Andrew Meyer
- Mike Michel
- Doug Middleton
- Edmond Miles
- Lamar Miller
- Scott Miller
- Billy Milner
- Christopher Milton
- Gene Milton
- Gene Mingo
- Travis Minor
- George Mira
- Koa Misi
- Earl Mitchell
- Marvin Mitchell
- Melvin Mitchell
- Scott Mitchell
- Shirdonya Mitchell
- Stan Mitchell
- Kenny Mixon
- Mario Monds
- Corey Moore
- Damontre Moore
- Dave Moore
- Eddie Moore
- Eric Moore
- Mack Moore
- Marlon Moore
- Matt Moore
- Maulty Moore
- Nat Moore
- Ronald Moore
- Stevon Moore
- Wayne Moore
- Doug Moreau
- Knowshon Moreno
- Earl Morrall
- Mercury Morris
- Sammy Morris
- Victor Morris
- Thomas Morstead
- Rick Moser
- Quentin Moses
- C. J. Mosley
- Avery Moss
- Raheem Mostert
- Alex Moyer
- Gene Mruczkowski
- Lloyd Mumphord
- Calvin Munson
- Lydon Murtha
- Chris Myarick

== N ==
- Legedu Naanee
- Jamie Nails
- John Nalbone
- Tony Nathan
- Ikechuku Ndukwe
- Siran Neal
- Ray Nealy
- Joe Nedney
- Nik Needham
- Bob Neff
- Billy Neighbors
- Nate Ness
- Ed Newman
- Keith Newman
- Kendall Newson
- Parry Nickerson
- Scott Nicolas
- Rob Ninkovich
- Robert Nkemdiche
- Troy Nolan
- Tom Nomina
- Karl Noonan
- Rick Norton
- Don Nottingham
- Jeff Novak

== O ==
- Cliff Odom
- Jared Odrick
- John Offerdahl
- Emmanuel Ogbah
- Jeff Ogden
- Alfred Oglesby
- Evan Oglesby
- Adewale Ogunleye
- Nick O'Leary
- Louis Oliver
- Muhammad Oliver
- Igor Olshansky
- Tom Orosz
- Leon Orr
- Ralph Ortega
- Brock Osweiler
- Louis Oubre
- Greg Ours
- David Overstreet
- Matt Overton
- Chris Owens
- Morris Owens
- Rich Owens

== P ==
- Chase Page
- Tony Paige
- Michael Palardy
- Dick Palmer
- Adam Pankey
- Ernie Park
- DeVante Parker
- Steven Parker
- Cody Parkey
- Will Parks
- Bernie Parmalee
- Tyler Patmon
- Dimitri Patterson
- Riley Patterson
- Patrick Paul
- Spencer Paysinger
- Isaiah Pead
- Willie Pearson
- Doug Pederson
- Justin Peelle
- Chad Pennington
- Taybor Pepper
- Samaje Perine
- Brett Perriman
- Ed Perry
- Jamal Perry
- Jereme Perry
- Malcolm Perry
- Senorise Perry
- Todd Perry
- Wally Pesuit
- Bob Petrella
- Jaelan Phillips
- Jordan Phillips (born 1992)
- Jordan Phillips (born 2004)
- Lawrence Phillips
- Tim Pidgeon
- Jason Pierre-Paul
- Brandon Pili
- Jamiyus Pittman
- Lafayette Pitts
- Joe Planansky
- Bruce Plummer
- Lousaka Polite
- David Pool
- Ken Poole
- Will Poole
- Derrick Pope
- Joey Porter
- Julian Posey
- Steve Potter
- Roosevelt Potts
- Mike Pouncey
- Alvin Powell
- Jesse Powell
- Jordan Poyer
- De'Andre Presley
- Roell Preston
- Sammy Price
- Isaiah Prince
- Stanley Pritchett
- Cory Procter
- Joe Prokop
- James Pruitt
- Julius Pruitt
- Barry Pryor
- Jack Pyburn

== Q ==
- Robert Quinn

== R ==
- Jason Rader
- Floyd Raglin
- Bacarri Rambo
- Jalen Ramsey
- Kheeston Randall
- Tate Randle
- Bo Rather
- Ricky Ray
- Ike Readon
- Willard Reaves
- Sheldrick Redwine
- Chris Reed
- Kerry Reed
- Malik Reed
- Don Reese
- Mike Reichenbach
- Dameon Reilly
- Trevor Reilly
- Austin Reiter
- Tyshun Render
- Fuad Reveiz
- Earnest Rhone
- Ken Rice
- Jeff Richardson
- John Richardson
- Kyle Richardson
- Willie Richardson
- Duke Riley
- Jim Riley
- Mike Rivera
- Bo Roberson
- Vern Roberson
- Archie Roberts
- Elandon Roberts
- George Roberts
- Guy Roberts
- Bryan Robinson
- Chop Robinson
- Derreck Robinson
- Ethan Robinson
- Fred Robinson
- Gerell Robinson
- Terry Robiskie
- Reggie Roby
- John Roderick
- Derrick Rodgers
- Charlie Rogers
- Nick Rogers
- Dario Romero
- Dante Rosario
- Donovan Rose
- Joe Rose
- Lowell Rose
- Josh Rosen
- Sage Rosenfels
- Brandian Ross
- Matt Roth
- Pete Roth
- Eric Rowe
- Mark Royals
- Hayden Rucci
- Tim Ruddy
- Jack Rudolph
- Anderson Russell
- Cliff Russell
- Twan Russell
- Sean Ryan

== S ==
- Bryant Salter
- Lawrence Sampleton
- Josh Samuda
- Mark Sander
- Braylon Sanders
- Jason Sanders
- Benny Sapp
- Samson Satele
- Jonah Savaiinaea
- James Saxon
- Brennan Scarlett
- Jordan Scarlett
- Duke Schamel
- Lance Schulters
- Scott Schwedes
- Jake Scott
- Rashawn Scott
- Ronald Scott
- Stanley Scott
- Sammy Seamster
- Junior Seau
- Scott Secules
- Larry Seiple
- Andy Selfridge
- Ron Sellers
- Robin Sendlein
- Adam Shaheen
- Larry Shannon
- Josh Shaw
- Terrance Shaw
- Jabaal Sheard
- Kory Sheets
- Kendall Sheffield
- Derrick Shelby
- Mike Sheldon
- Brandon Shell
- L. J. Shelton
- Leslie Shepherd
- Kelvin Sheppard
- Marcus Sherels
- Trent Sherfield
- Jackie Shipp
- Sanders Shiver
- Mickey Shuler, Jr.
- Steve Shull
- Zach Sieler
- Rich Siler
- Sam Simmons
- Antoine Simpson
- Bob Simpson
- Dion Sims
- Keith Sims
- Chris Singleton
- Josh Sitton
- Steve Slaton
- Gerald Small
- Justin Smiley
- Brent Smith
- Cam Smith
- Clifton Smith
- Derek Smith
- De'Veon Smith
- Frankie Smith
- Jonnu Smith
- Kelvin Smith
- Kion Smith
- Lamar Smith
- Maurice Smith
- Mike Smith
- Sammie Smith
- Sean Smith
- Shelley Smith
- Thomas Smith
- Wade Smith
- Willie Smith
- Durham Smythe
- Brian Sochia
- Paul Soliai
- Freddie Solomon
- Jesse Solomon
- Robert Sowell
- Ryan Spadola
- Martrell Spaight
- Akeem Spence
- Kory Sperry
- Cotton Speyrer
- Irving Spikes
- Austin Spitler
- Donnie Spragan
- Marcus Spriggs
- Jack Squirek
- John St. Clair
- Bill Stanfill
- R. J. Stanford
- Scott Stankavage
- Randy Starks
- Anthony Steen
- Linden Stephens
- Dwight Stephenson
- Zach Sterup
- Michael Stewart
- Rayna Stewart
- Ben Stille
- Kenny Stills
- John Stofa
- Barry Stokes
- Jack Stoll
- Jake Stoneburner
- Greg Storr
- Cliff Stoudt
- Otto Stowe
- Pete Stoyanovich
- Troy Stradford
- Cole Strange
- Don Strock
- Billy Strother
- Jason Strowbridge
- Danny Stubbs
- Henry Stuckey
- Caleb Sturgis
- Lee Suggs
- Ndamukong Suh
- Patrick Surtain
- Keaton Sutherland
- Freddie Swain
- John Swain
- Travis Swanson
- Harry Swayne
- Doug Swift
- Pat Swoopes

== T ==
- John Tagliaferri
- Tua Tagovailoa
- Cordrea Tankersley
- Ryan Tannehill
- Barron Tanner
- Terry Tautolo
- Ed Taylor
- Henry Taylor
- Jamar Taylor
- Jason Taylor
- Johnny Taylor
- Vincent Taylor
- George Teague
- Don Testerman
- Tom Thayer
- Marcus Thigpen
- Tyler Thigpen
- Dallas Thomas
- Daniel Thomas
- Donald Thomas
- Joey Thomas
- Julius Thomas
- Kiwaukee Thomas
- Lamar Thomas
- Michael Thomas
- Norris Thomas
- Robert Thomas
- Rodell Thomas
- Rodney Thomas
- Thurman Thomas
- Zach Thomas
- Derrius Thompson
- Lamont Thompson
- Reyna Thompson
- Skylar Thompson
- Jack Thornton
- Van Tiffin
- Emmett Tilley
- Andre Tillman
- Travares Tillman
- Lawrence Timmons
- Channing Tindall
- Jeff Toews
- Cameron Tom
- Reggie Torbor
- LaVerne Torczon
- Bob Torrey
- Tom Toth
- Steve Towle
- Lester Towns
- Dante Trader Jr.
- Keith Traylor
- Zach Triner
- Jordan Tripp
- Jason Trusnik
- Gary Tucker
- Laremy Tunsil
- Matt Turk
- Billy Turner
- De'Lance Turner
- Patrick Turner
- T. J. Turner
- Howard Twilley

== U ==
- Jeff Uhlenhake
- Jim Urbanek
- Kraig Urbik
- Iheanyi Uwaezuoke

== V ==
- Andrew Van Ginkel
- Kyle Van Noy
- Craig Veasey
- Alterraun Verner
- Olivier Vernon
- Marcus Vick
- Zach Vigil
- Tommy Vigorito
- Troy Vincent
- Rick Volk
- Uwe von Schamann

== W ==
- Jaylen Waddle
- Jonathan Wade
- Todd Wade
- Frank Wainright
- Cameron Wake
- Erik Walden
- Clive Walford
- Anthony Walker Jr.
- Bracy Walker
- Brian Walker
- Fulton Walker
- Mike Wallace
- Roberto Wallace
- Darren Waller
- Rod Walters
- Mark Walton
- Hal Wantland
- Dedric Ward
- Ronnie Ward
- Paul Warfield
- Julius Warmsley
- Jimmy Warren
- DeAndre Washington
- Dick Washington
- Malik Washington
- Mark Washington
- Tahj Washington
- Danny Watkins
- Theo Wease Jr.
- Jed Weaver
- J'Marcus Webb
- Richmond Webb
- Ken Webster
- Larry Webster
- Bert Weidner
- Ed Weisacosky
- Wes Welker
- Willie West
- Nick Westbrook-Ikhine
- Dick Westmoreland
- Philip Wheeler
- Jeris White
- Mike White
- Pat White
- Taylor Whitley
- Tom Wickert
- Ernest Wilford
- Christian Wilkins
- Dan Wilkinson
- Brandon Williams
- Connor Williams
- Damian Williams
- Damien Williams
- Delvin Williams
- Gene Williams
- Jarvis Williams
- Jay Williams
- Joel Williams
- Jordan Williams
- Kevin Williams
- Mario Williams
- Maxie Williams
- Mike Williams
- Nick Williams
- Preston Williams
- Quintin Williams
- Renaud Williams
- Ricky Williams
- Ronnie Williams
- Sylvester Williams
- Trill Williams
- Gerald Willis
- Klaus Wilmsmeyer
- Albert Wilson
- Cedrick Wilson Jr.
- George Wilson
- Gibril Wilson
- Jeff Wilson
- Jerry Wilson
- Jimmy Wilson
- Karl Wilson
- Robert Wilson
- Zach Wilson
- Derek Wimberly
- Stan Winfrey
- Chase Winovich
- Jeff Wiska
- Dick Wood
- Jackson Woodard
- Jonathan Woodard
- Shawn Wooden
- David Woodley
- Larry Woods
- Freddie Woodson
- Cameron Worrell
- Gabe Wright
- Jaylen Wright
- Manuel Wright
- Rodrique Wright
- Isaiah Wynn
- Jimmy Wyrick

== Y ==
- Billy Yates
- T. J. Yates
- Will Yeatman
- Garo Yepremian
- Sam Young
- Steve Young
- Willie Young

== Z ==
- Dave Zawatson
- Rich Zecher
- Zach Zenner
- Jeff Zgonina
- Justin Zimmer
- Scott Zolak
