= 1987 Miami Dolphins season =

22nd season in franchise history; first in Joe Robbie Stadium

- Head coach: Don Shula
- Home stadium: Joe Robbie Stadium

Results
- Record: 8–7
- Division place: 3rd AFC East
- Playoffs: Did not qualify
- Pro Bowlers: 3: QB Dan Marino; C Dwight Stephenson; ILB John Offerdahl

The 1987 Miami Dolphins season was the team's 22nd as a member of the National Football League (NFL). The Dolphins improved upon their previous season's output of 8–8, losing one fewer game. Despite the improvement the team failed to reach the playoffs. This was also the first season the Dolphins played their home games at Joe Robbie Stadium. Their first game at Joe Robbie Stadium was scheduled to open the stadium against the defending champion New York Giants but the 1987 strike resulted in all games from week 3 being permanently cancelled. So the first contest at the new venue involved replacement players, as 25,867 fans saw the Dolphins defeat the Kansas City Chiefs. The Dolphins finally played a 1987 home game with the regular players in week 6, losing in overtime to the Buffalo Bills.

== Offseason ==
=== NFL draft ===
1987 Miami Dolphins draft
Round	Pick	Player	Position	College	Notes
1	16	John Bosa	Defensive end	Boston College	
2	43	Rick Graf	Linebacker	Wisconsin	
2	56	Scott Schwedes	Wide receiver	Syracuse	
4	99	Troy Stradford	Running back	Boston College	
5	132	Chris Conlin	Tackle	Penn State	
6	155	Lance Sellers	Linebacker	Boise State	
7	182	Tom Brown	Running back	Pittsburgh	
8	210	Joel Williams	Tight end	Notre Dame	
8	212	Mark Dennis	Tackle	Illinois	
9	237	Tim Pidgeon	Linebacker	Syracuse	
10	266	Bobby Taylor	Defensive back	Wisconsin	
11	293	Terence Mann	Defensive tackle	SMU	
12	322	Jim Karsatos	Quarterback	Ohio State	
Made roster * Made at least one Pro Bowl during career

== Personnel ==
=== Staff ===
1987 Miami Dolphins staff
Front office: President – Joe Robbie; Executive vice president/general manager – Mike Robbie; Vice-president – Don Shula; Director of player personnel – Chuck Connor; Director of pro scouting – Charley Winner; Head coaches: Head coach – Don Shula; Assistant head coach – David Shula; Offensive coaches: Quarterbacks/Receivers – David Shula; Offensive backs – Carl Taseff; Tight ends – Mike Westhoff; Offensive line – John Sandusky	Defensive coaches: Defense – Tom Olivadotti; Defensive line – Dan Sekanovich; Linebackers – Chuck Studley; Defensive backs – Mel Phillips; Special teams coaches: Special teams – Mike Westhoff; Strength and conditioning: Strength and conditioning – Junior Wade

=== NFL replacement players ===
After the league decided to use replacement players during the NFLPA strike, the following team was assembled:

- Kyle Mackey, whose father, Dee Mackey, played for Don Shula with the Baltimore Colts, served as a replacement quarterback.

1987 Miami Dolphins replacement roster
Quarterbacks: 14 Scott Stankavage; 15 Kyle Mackey; 16 Geoff Torretta; Running backs: 20 Rickey Isom FB; 31 Kenny Rogers; 32 Pete Roth; 33 Ronald Scott; 35 John Tagliaferri; 38 Clarence Bailey; 41 Mark Konecny FB; Wide receivers: 81 Mike Caterbone; 82 Todd Feldman; 82 Shea Walker; 83 Dameon Reilly; 85 Eddie Chavis; 86 George Farmer; 88 Greg Petty; 89 Leland Douglas; Tight ends: 80 Lawrence Sampleton; 84 Willie Smith; 87 Rich Siler	Offensive linemen: 61 Greg Cleveland; 63 Greg Ours C; 65 Bill Bealles RT; 66 Jim Gilmore LG; 67 Guy Goar; 68 Louis Oubre RG; 71 Scott Kehoe LT; 72 Steve Jacobson; 74 Jeff Wiska; Defensive linemen: 64 Michael Blake; 69 Mike Lambrecht NT; 70 Al Wring; 77 Stanley Scott; 78 Derek Wimberly LE; 79 Ike Readon; 93 Charles Bennett RE	Linebackers: 50 Greg Storr; 52 Dennis Fowlkes OLB; 54 Steve Lubischer; 60 Duke Schamel OLB; 91 Victor Morris ILB; 92 Laz Chavez; 94 Tim Pidgeon ILB; Defensive backs: 21 Tate Randle SS; 23 Demetrious Johnson; 24 Floyd Raglin; 40 John Swain RCB; 42 Robert Sowell LCB; 45 Trell Hooper FS; 46 Mark Irvin; 48 Daniel McFadden; 49 Marvell Burgess; Special teams: 2 Willie Beecher K; 14 Stacy Gore P

=== Roster ===
1987 Miami Dolphins roster
Quarterbacks (QB): 17 Ron Jaworski; 13 Dan Marino; 10 Don Strock; Running backs (RB): 34 Woody Bennett; 30 Ron Davenport; 27 Lorenzo Hampton; 22 Tony Nathan; 23 Troy Stradford; Wide receivers (WR): 86 Fred Banks; 83 Mark Clayton; 85 Mark Duper; 11 Jim Jensen; 82 James Pruitt; 81 Scott Schwedes; Tight ends (TE): 84 Bruce Hardy; 87 Dan Johnson	Offensive linemen (OL): 65 Jeff Dellenbach C; 74 Mark Dennis T; 61 Roy Foster G; 79 Jon Giesler T; 71 Bob Gruber T; 60 Jim Huddleston G; 72 Ronnie Lee T; 78 Doug Marrone G/C; 76 Tom Toth G; Defensive linemen (DL): 75 Doug Betters DE; 97 John Bosa DE; 98 Jackie Cline NT; 99 George Little DE; 70 Brian Sochia NT; 95 T. J. Turner DE	Linebackers (LB): 51 Mark Brown OLB; 59 Bob Brudzinski OLB; 53 David Frye OLB; 58 Rick Graf OLB; 55 Hugh Green OLB; 54 Larry Kolic ILB; 52 Scott Nicolas ILB; 56 John Offerdahl ILB; 50 Jackie Shipp ILB; Defensive backs (DB): 43 Bud Brown FS; 49 William Judson CB; 44 Paul Lankford CB; 29 Liffort Hobley SS; 28 Don McNeal CB; 26 Donovan Rose FS; 25 Mike Smith CB; 24 Reyna Thompson CB; Special teams (ST): 4 Reggie Roby P; 7 Fuad Reveiz K	Reserve: 47 Glenn Blackwood S (IR); 36 Tom Brown RB (IR); 67 Chris Conlin G (IR); 66 Jim Gilmore G (IR); 90 Andy Hendel LB (IR); 38 DeShon Jenkins S (IR); 16 Jim Karsatos QB (IR); 69 Mike Lambrecht NT (IR); -- Robin Sendlein LB (IR); -- Rich Siler TE (IR); 57 Dwight Stephenson C (IR); Rookies in italics

== Schedule ==
Week	Date	Opponent	Result	Record	Venue	Attendance
1	September 13	at **New England Patriots**	**L** 21–28	0–1	Sullivan Stadium	54,642
2	September 20	at **Indianapolis Colts**	**W** 23–10	1–1	Hoosier Dome	57,524
–	September 27	New York Giants	canceled	1–1	Joe Robbie Stadium	
3	October 4	at Seattle Seahawks	**L** 20–24	1–2	Kingdome	19,448
4	October 11	Kansas City Chiefs	**W** 42–0	2–2	Joe Robbie Stadium	25,867
5	October 18	at **New York Jets**	**L** 31–37 (OT)	2–3	Giants Stadium	18,249
6	October 25	**Buffalo Bills**	**L** 31–34 (OT)	2–4	Joe Robbie Stadium	61,295
7	November 1	Pittsburgh Steelers	**W** 35–24	3–4	Joe Robbie Stadium	52,578
8	November 8	at Cincinnati Bengals	**W** 20–14	4–4	Riverfront Stadium	53,840
9	November 15	**Indianapolis Colts**	**L** 21–40	4–5	Joe Robbie Stadium	65,433
10	November 22	at Dallas Cowboys	**W** 20–14	5–5	Texas Stadium	56,519
11	November 29	at **Buffalo Bills**	**L** 0–27	5–6	Rich Stadium	68,055
12	December 7	**New York Jets**	**W** 37–28	6–6	Joe Robbie Stadium	62,592
13	December 13	at Philadelphia Eagles	**W** 28–10	7–6	Veterans Stadium	63,841
14	December 20	Washington Redskins	**W** 23–21	8–6	Joe Robbie Stadium	65,715
15	December 28	**New England Patriots**	**L** 10–24	8–7	Joe Robbie Stadium	61,192
Note: Intra-division opponents are in **bold** text.

== Season summary ==
=== Week 1 ===
Team	1	2	3	4	Total
Dolphins	7	14	0	0	21
• Patriots	7	7	14	0	28

- Date: September 13, 1987
- Location: Schaefer Stadium
- Game start: 1:00 p.m. EST
- Game attendance: 54,642
- Game weather: 61 °F (16.1 °C); wind 10 miles per hour (16 km/h; 8.7 kn), rainy
- Referee: Tom Dooley
- TV announcers (NBC): Don Criqui and Bob Trumpy

Miami Dolphins punter Reggie Roby injured in the game, forcing Don Strock to punt in the emergency situation. Additionally, with 2:22 left in the game Dan Marino was injured forcing Strock to fill in at the quarterback position as well, nearly mounting a winning comeback drive.

=== Week 6 ===
Buffalo Bills (2-3) at Miami Dolphins (2-3)

Team	1	2	3	4	OT	Total
• Bills	0	3	14	14	3	34
Dolphins	14	7	0	10	0	31

- Date: October 25, 1987
- Location: Joe Robbie Stadium
- Game start: 1:00 p.m. EST
- Game attendance: 61,295
- Game weather: 78 °F (25.6 °C); wind 10 miles per hour (16 km/h; 8.7 kn)
- Referee: Pat Haggerty
- TV announcers (NBC): Jim Donovan and Paul Maguire

=== Week 14 ===
Team	1	2	3	4	Total
Redskins	0	7	7	7	21
• Dolphins	0	9	0	14	23

- Date: December 20
- Location: Joe Robbie Stadium
- Game start: 8:00 p.m. EST
- Game attendance: 65,715
- Game weather: 74 °F (23 °C); wind 15 mph (24 km/h)
- Referee: Fred Wyant
- TV announcers (ESPN): Mike Patrick, Roy Firestone, Larry Csonka

Scoring summary
Q2	MIA	Reviez 48 yard field goal	MIA 3–0
Q2	WSH	Bryant 6 yard run (Haji-Sheikh kick)	WSH 7–3
Q2	MIA	Duper 26 yard pass from Marino	MIA 9–7
Q3	WSH	Schroeder 6 yard run (Hajji-Sheikh kick)	WSH 14–9
Q4	MIA	Duper 59 yard pass from Marino (Reveiz kick)	MIA 16–14
Q4	WSH	Rogers 2yard run (Haji-Sheikh kick)	WSH 21–16
Q4	MIA	Duper 6 yard pass from Marino (Reveiz kick)	MIA 23–21

- Dan Marino 22/50, 393 Yds
- Mark Duper 6 Rec, 170 Yds

== Standings ==
AFC East
	W	L	T	PCT	DIV	CONF	PF	PA	STK
^{(3)} Indianapolis Colts	9	6	0	.600	5–3	8–6	300	238	W2
New England Patriots	8	7	0	.533	6–2	8–4	320	293	W3
Miami Dolphins	8	7	0	.533	2–6	5–7	362	335	L1
Buffalo Bills	7	8	0	.467	4–4	6–6	270	305	L2
New York Jets	6	9	0	.400	3–5	6–5	334	360	L4
