= 1988 Miami Dolphins season =

23rd season in franchise history

- Head coach: Don Shula
- Home stadium: Joe Robbie Stadium

Results
- Record: 6–10
- Division place: 5th AFC East
- Playoffs: Did not qualify
- Pro Bowlers: 2: WR Mark Clayton; NT Brian Sochia

The 1988 Miami Dolphins season was the team's 23rd as a member of the National Football League (NFL). The Dolphins failed to improve upon their previous season's output of 8–7, winning only six games and failing to reach the playoffs for the third straight season.

Even without future Pro Football Hall of Fame center Dwight Stephenson, who was forced to retire prior to this season due to injuries, the Dolphins offensive line set the record for fewest sacks in a single season with 7 during 1988, protecting quarterback Dan Marino. Marino was only sacked on 0.98% of his dropbacks in 1988, also a single-season NFL record.

This would be the last time Don Shula recorded a losing record during his tenure as Dolphins coach, and in his coaching career overall. It would be the final losing season for the Dolphins for 15 years.

== Offseason ==
=== NFL draft ===
1988 Miami Dolphins draft
Round	Pick	Player	Position	College	Notes
1	16	Eric Kumerow	Linebacker	Ohio State	
2	42	Jarvis Williams	Safety	Florida	
3	73	Ferrell Edmunds *	Tight end	Maryland	
4	99	Greg Johnson	Guard	Oklahoma	
5	126	Rodney Thomas	Cornerback	BYU	
6	153	Mel Bratton	Running back	Miami (FL)	
6	156	George Cooper	Running back	Ohio State	
7	180	Kerwin Bell	Quarterback	Florida	
8	212	Harry Galbreath	Guard	Tennessee	
8	220	Louis Cheek	Tackle	Texas A&M	
9	239	Jeff Cross *	Defensive end	Missouri	
10	266	Artis Jackson	Defensive tackle	Texas Tech	
11	292	Tom Kelleher	Running back	Holy Cross	
12	320	Brian Kinchen	Tight end	LSU	
Made roster * Made at least one Pro Bowl during career

== Personnel ==
=== Staff ===
1988 Miami Dolphins staff
Front office: President – Joe Robbie; Executive vice president/general manager – Mike Robbie; Vice president of administration and finance – Eddie Jones; Vice president – Don Shula; Director of player personnel – Chuck Connor; Director of pro scouting – Charley Winner; Head coaches: Head coach – Don Shula; Assistant head coach – David Shula; Offensive coaches: Quarterbacks/pass game – David Shula; Offensive backs – Carl Taseff; Receivers – Larry Seiple; Tight ends – Mike Westhoff; Offensive line – John Sandusky	Defensive coaches: Defense – Tom Olivadotti; Defensive line – Dan Sekanovich; Linebackers – Chuck Studley; Defensive backs – Mel Phillips; Special teams coaches: Special teams – Mike Westhoff; Strength and conditioning: Strength and conditioning – Junior Wade

=== Roster ===
1988 Miami Dolphins roster
Quarterbacks (QB): 17 Ron Jaworski; 13 Dan Marino; Running backs (RB): 34 Woody Bennett FB; 20 Joe Cribbs KR; 33 Tony Burse; 30 Ron Davenport FB; 27 Lorenzo Hampton; 11 Jim Jensen FB; 23 Troy Stradford; Wide receivers (WR): 86 Fred Banks; 83 Mark Clayton; 81 Scott Schwedes PR; 82 Jimmy Teal; Tight ends (TE): 80 Ferrell Edmunds; 88 Brian Kinchen LS	Offensive linemen (OL): 77 Louis Cheek T; 65 Jeff Dellenbach C; 61 Roy Foster G; 62 Harry Galbreath G; 79 Jon Giesler T; 73 Greg Johnson T; 72 Ronnie Lee T; 76 Tom Toth G; Defensive linemen (DL): 98 Jackie Cline DE; 93 Jeff Cross DE; 92 Nate Hill DE; 69 Mike Lambrecht NT; 70 Brian Sochia NT; 95 T. J. Turner DE	Linebackers (LB): 51 Mark Brown ILB; 59 Bob Brudzinski OLB; 53 David Frye OLB; 58 Tony Furjanic ILB; 99 Rick Graf OLB; 55 Hugh Green OLB; 54 Larry Kolic ILB; 56 John Offerdahl ILB; Defensive backs (DB): 43 Bud Brown SS; 29 Liffort Hobley SS; 49 William Judson CB; 44 Paul Lankford CB; 28 Don McNeal CB; 38 Bruce Plummer CB; 24 Reyna Thompson CB; 26 Jarvis Williams FS; Special teams (ST): 7 Fuad Reveiz K; 4 Reggie Roby P	Reserve: 47 Glenn Blackwood S (IR); 97 John Bosa DE (IR); 36 Tom Brown FB (PUP); 67 Chris Conlin T (PUP); 74 Mark Dennis T (IR); 85 Mark Duper WR (NF-Ill.); 84 Bruce Hardy TE (IR); 87 Dan Johnson TE (PUP); 90 Eric Kumerow DE (IR); 52 Scott Nicolas LB (IR); 68 Chris Scott DE (IR); 50 Jackie Shipp LB (IR); 48 Chad Stark RB (IR); 57 Dwight Stephenson C (PUP); 45 Rodney Thomas CB (IR); Rookies in italics 47 active, 15 reserve

== Regular season ==
=== Schedule ===
Week	Date	Opponent	Result	Record	Venue	Attendance
1	September 4	at Chicago Bears	**L** 7–34	0–1	Soldier Field	63,330
2	September 11	at **Buffalo Bills**	**L** 6–9	0–2	Rich Stadium	79,520
3	September 18	Green Bay Packers	**W** 24–17	1–2	Joe Robbie Stadium	54,409
4	September 25	at **Indianapolis Colts**	**L** 13–15	1–3	Hoosier Dome	59,638
5	October 2	Minnesota Vikings	**W** 24–7	2–3	Joe Robbie Stadium	59,867
6	October 9	at Los Angeles Raiders	**W** 24–14	3–3	Los Angeles Memorial Coliseum	50,751
7	October 16	San Diego Chargers	**W** 31–28	4–3	Joe Robbie Stadium	58,972
8	October 23	**New York Jets**	**L** 30–44	4–4	Joe Robbie Stadium	68,292
9	October 30	at Tampa Bay Buccaneers	**W** 17–14	5–4	Tampa Stadium	67,352
10	November 6	at **New England Patriots**	**L** 10–21	5–5	Sullivan Stadium	60,840
11	November 14	**Buffalo Bills**	**L** 6–31	5–6	Joe Robbie Stadium	67,091
12	November 20	**New England Patriots**	**L** 3–6	5–7	Joe Robbie Stadium	53,526
13	November 27	at **New York Jets**	**L** 34–38	5–8	Giants Stadium	52,752
14	December 4	**Indianapolis Colts**	**L** 28–31	5–9	Joe Robbie Stadium	45,236
15	December 12	Cleveland Browns	**W** 38–31	6–9	Joe Robbie Stadium	61,884
16	December 18	at Pittsburgh Steelers	**L** 24–40	6–10	Three Rivers Stadium	36,051
Note: Intra-division opponents are in **bold** text.

=== Game summaries ===
==== Week 5 ====
First time Dan Marino faced the Minnesota Vikings in the regular season.

Minnesota Vikings (3-1) at Miami Dolphins (2-2)

Team	1	2	3	4	Total
Vikings	0	0	0	7	7
• Dolphins	0	17	7	0	24

- Date: Oct 2, 1988
- Location: Joe Robbie Stadium
- Game start: 4:00 p.m. EST
- Game attendance: 59,867
- Game weather: 88 °F (31 °C) - Wind 8 mph (13 km/h)mph
- Referee: Jerry Markbreit
- TV announcers (CBS): Dick Stockton and Dan Fouts

==== Week 6 ====
Team	1	2	3	4	Total
• Dolphins	0	24	0	0	24
Raiders	0	0	7	7	14

- Date: October 9
- Location: Los Angeles Memorial Coliseum, Los Angeles
- Game start: 1:00 p.m.
- Game weather: 74 °F (23 °C), wind 10 mph (16 km/h)

Scoring summary
2	MIA	Lorenzo Hampton 1 yard run (Fuad Reveiz kick)	Dolphins 7–0
2	MIA	Liffort Hobley 19 yard fumble return (Fuad Reveiz kick)	Dolphins 14–0
2	MIA	Fuad Reveiz 45 yard field goal	Dolphins 17–0
2	MIA	Jim Jensen 17 yard pass from Dan Marino (Fuad Reveiz kick)	Dolphins 24–0
3	LA	Mervyn Fernandez 7 yard pass from Jay Schroeder (Chris Bahr kick)	Dolphins 24–7
4	LA	Steve Strachan 13 yard pass from Jay Schroeder (Chris Bahr kick)	Dolphins 24–14

=== Standings ===
AFC East
	W	L	T	PCT	DIV	CONF	PF	PA	STK
^{(2)} Buffalo Bills	12	4	0	.750	7–1	10–2	329	237	L1
Indianapolis Colts	9	7	0	.563	5–3	7–5	354	315	W1
New England Patriots	9	7	0	.563	5–3	7–5	250	284	L1
New York Jets	8	7	1	.531	3–5	6–7–1	372	354	W2
Miami Dolphins	6	10	0	.375	0–8	3–9	319	380	L1

== Awards and records ==
- October 23, 1988: Dan Marino set a franchise record for most passing yards in one game (521)
- November 6, 1988: Jim Jensen set a franchise record for most receptions in one game (12)
- Brian Sochia, Pro Bowl selection
