= Anthony Bennett (gridiron football) =

American gridiron football player (born 1996)

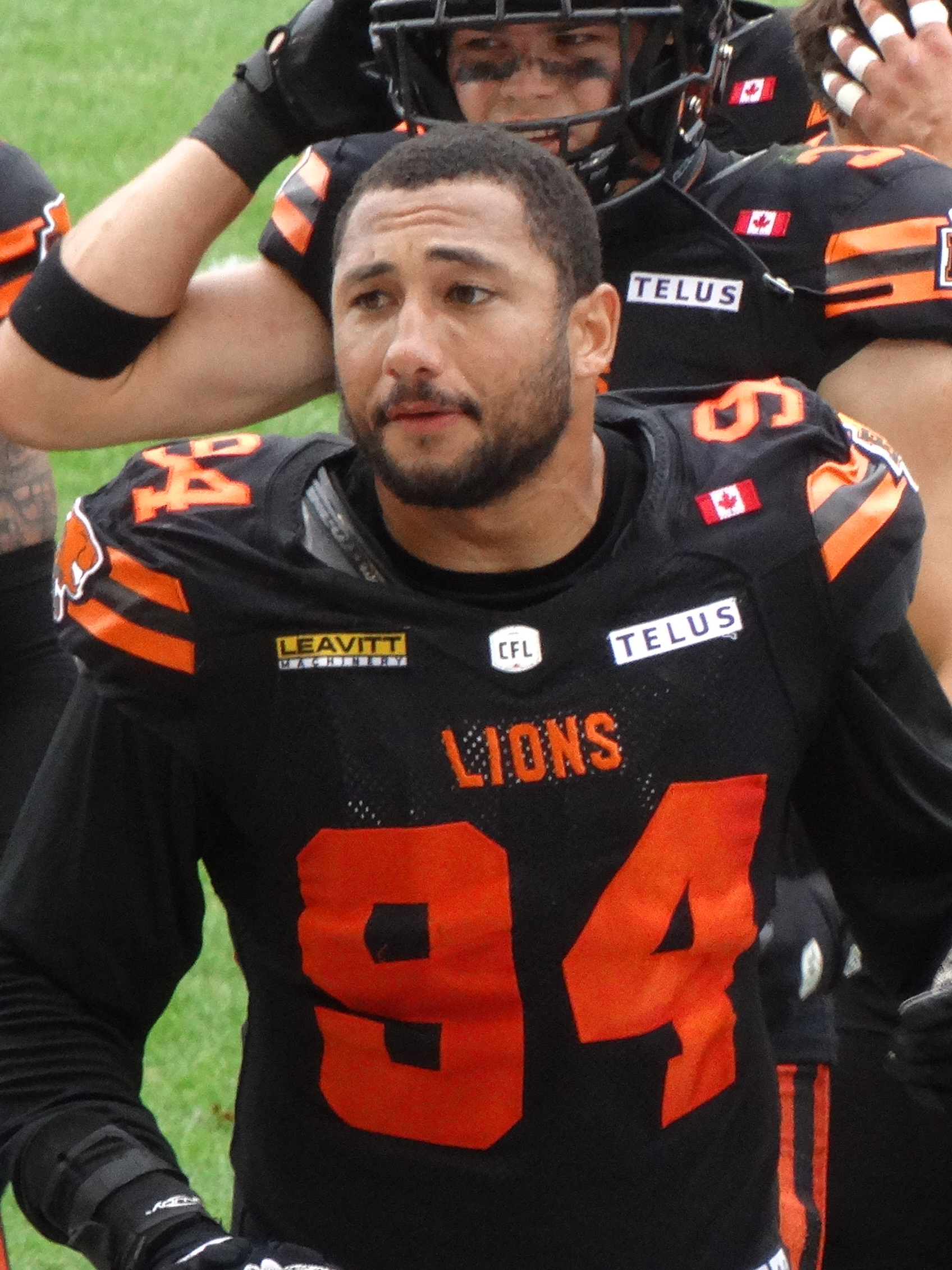
- Bennett with the BC Lions in 2025

Profile
- Position: Defensive lineman

Personal information
- Born: October 4, 1996 (age 30); Weston, Florida, U.S.
- Listed height: 6 ft 1 in (1.85 m)
- Listed weight: 230 lb (104 kg)

Career information
- High school: Cypress Bay
- College: Florida Atlantic (2015–2019); Regina (2021–2022)
- CFL draft: 2023: 1st round, 8th overall pick

Career history
- 2023: Winnipeg Blue Bombers
- 2025: Montreal Alouettes*
- 2025: Ottawa Redblacks
- 2025: BC Lions
- * Offseason or practice squad member only

Career CFL statistics as of 2025
- Total tackles: 14
- Sacks: 0
- Forced fumbles: 0
- Fumble recoveries: 0
- Interceptions: 0
- Stats at CFL.ca

Anthony Bennett (born October 4, 1996) is an American professional football defensive lineman who is currently a free agent. He played NCAA football for the Florida Atlantic Owls and U Sports football for the Regina Rams and was selected in the first round of the 2023 CFL draft by the Winnipeg Blue Bombers.

== Early life ==
Bennett was born on October 4, 1996, in Weston, Florida. His father, Charles Bennett, was drafted into the National Football League (NFL) and played three games with the Miami Dolphins in 1987 as a defensive end. His mother, Patricia, who was born and raised in Canada, was a trainer and manager for the Regina Cougars basketball team.

== Early career ==
Bennett attended Cypress Bay High School, where he competed in football, shot put, and discus. Bennett entered Florida Atlantic University in 2015 and began playing for their Owls football team. He totaled four tackles and a forced fumble while playing ten games in his time with Florida Atlantic. After the 2019 season, Lane Kiffin left the coaching position and was replaced by Willie Taggart. Willie Taggart disliked the idea of having Bennett on the team as a redshirt senior and said, "I'm gonna recruit some other guys". Bennett left the Florida Atlantic Owls over the COVID-19-affected NCAA season.

Bennett moved to Canada and resumed his college career at the University of Regina, where his mother had earned an education degree. With two years of U Sports eligibility remaining, he joined the Regina Rams in 2021, obtaining a starter role and led the team's defensive linemen in tackles with 25. In his final year of eligibility, 2022, he had career highs with 38 tackles, 12.5 TFLs and nine sacks, breaking a record for most sacks in a single season, and tying the school record for most tackles-for-loss in a single season. For his performance in the 2022 season, he was named to the U Sports All-Canadian First Team and as a Canada West All-Star. He finished his U Sports career with 63 total tackles, 11 sacks, one forced fumble, and one interception in 14 games.

== Professional career ==
Pre-draft measurables
Height	Weight	40-yard dash	20-yard shuttle	Three-cone drill	Vertical jump	Broad jump	Bench press
6 ft 0 5/8 in (1.84 m)	229 lb (104 kg)	4.76 s	4.41 s	7.27 s	30.0 in (0.76 m)	9 ft 6 5/8 in (2.91 m)	16 reps
All values from CFL Combine

=== Winnipeg Blue Bombers ===
Ranked as the third-best U Sports prospect for the 2023 CFL draft and the 16th-best prospect overall, Bennett was chosen eighth overall by the Winnipeg Blue Bombers, an unexpected rise in the draft order. He signed with the Blue Bombers three days later. Bennett progressed through training camp in May and made the roster for opening day. He dressed in all 18 regular season games and had eight defensive tackles and three special teams tackles.

At the start of training camp in 2024, Bennett was released by the Blue Bombers on May 12, 2024.

=== Montreal Alouettes ===
After remaining unsigned for the 2024 season, it was announced on February 18, 2025, that Bennett had signed with the Montreal Alouettes to a one-year contract. However, he was released before the start of training camp on May 10, 2025.

=== Ottawa Redblacks ===
On June 17, 2025, it was announced that Bennett had signed with the Ottawa Redblacks. He played in two games where he recorded two special teams tackles before being released on July 16, 2025.

=== BC Lions ===
On August 11, 2025, Bennett signed with the BC Lions and joined their practice roster. On August 15, 2025, Bennett was added to the Lions' active roster. He was reassigned to the practice squad on September 4, 2025. On September 18, 2025, Bennett was recalled to the active roster. On October 3, 2025, Bennett was once again reassigned to the practice squad, where he spent the remainder of the 2025 CFL season. On November 24, 2025, Bennett re-signed with the Lions.

On April 14, 2026, Bennett was released by the Lions.

== Personal life ==
Bennett's father, Charles, uncle, Tony, cousin, Michael, and older brother, Andrew, have all played football professionally in the NFL and CFL.
