= Lorenzo Hampton =

American football player (born 1962)

No. 27, 20
- Position: Running back

Personal information
- Born: March 12, 1962 (age 64); Lake Wales, Florida, U.S.
- Listed height: 5 ft 11 in (1.80 m)
- Listed weight: 205 lb (93 kg)

Career information
- High school: Lake Wales
- College: Florida
- NFL draft: 1985: 1st round, 27th overall pick

Career history
- Miami Dolphins (1985–1989); Denver Broncos (1990)*; Dallas Cowboys (1990)*
- * Offseason or practice squad member only

Career NFL statistics
- Rushing yards: 1,949
- Rushing average: 3.9
- Receptions: 123
- Receiving yards: 954
- Total touchdowns: 28
- Stats at Pro Football Reference

Lorenzo Timothy Hampton (born March 12, 1962) is an American former professional football player who was a running back for five seasons in the National Football League (NFL) during the 1980s. Hampton played college football for the Florida Gators, and thereafter, he played in the NFL for the Miami Dolphins.

== Early life ==
Hampton was born in Lake Wales, Florida in 1962. He attended Lake Wales High School, and he played high school football for the Lake Wales Highlanders.

== College career ==
Hampton accepted an athletic scholarship to attend the University of Florida in Gainesville, Florida, where he played for coach Charley Pell and coach Galen Hall's Florida Gators teams from 1981 to 1984. Hampton shared the Gators' backfield with fellow running backs John L. Williams and Neal Anderson from 1982 to 1984, and he was often used as a blocking back when Williams and Anderson were the ball carriers. Memorably, he ran for 138 yards against the Florida State Seminoles in 1982. In his four seasons as a Gator, he compiled 1,993 rushing and 655 receiving yards.

== Professional career ==
The Miami Dolphins chose Hampton in the first round (27th pick overall) in the 1985 NFL draft. He played for coach Don Shula's Dolphins for five years from 1985 to 1989. Hampton started in thirty-three of the seventy games in which he played, and finished his career with 500 carries for 1,949 rushing yards and twenty-two touchdowns, 123 receptions for 954 receiving yards and six touchdowns, and ninety-six kickoff returns for 2,025 yards.

== NFL career statistics ==
Legend
**Bold**	Career high

Year	Team	Games		Rushing					Receiving				
Year	Team	GP	GS	Att	Yds	Avg	Lng	TD	Rec	Yds	Avg	Lng	TD
1985	MIA	16	1	105	369	3.5	15	3	8	56	7.0	15	0
1986	MIA	16	16	**186**	**830**	**4.5**	**54**	**9**	**61**	**446**	7.3	19	**3**
1987	MIA	12	7	75	289	3.9	34	1	23	223	**9.7**	24	0
1988	MIA	16	10	117	414	3.5	33	**9**	23	204	8.9	**39**	**3**
1989	MIA	10	0	17	47	2.8	9	0	8	25	3.1	12	0
Career		70	34	500	1,949	3.9	54	22	123	954	7.8	39	6

== Life after the NFL ==
Hampton's charitable foundation, Lemon-Aid Makers, runs a series of South Florida summer football camps in for inner-city elementary and middle school boys ages 7 to 14.

As of 2010, Hampton had been married to his wife Marcia for nineteen years. They have two children: a daughter, Loren, and a son, Lorenzo, Jr.

== See also ==
- Florida Gators football, 1980–89
- List of Florida Gators in the NFL draft
- List of Miami Dolphins first-round draft picks
- List of Miami Dolphins players
