= Thomas Caterbone =

American football player and coach (1964–1996)

Profile
- Position: Defensive back

Personal information
- Born: June 29, 1964; Lancaster, Pennsylvania
- Died: April 29, 1996 (aged 31); Kill Devil Hills, North Carolina
- Listed height: 5 ft 8 in (1.73 m)
- Listed weight: 175 lb (79 kg)

Career information
- High school: Lancaster Catholic (Lancaster, Pennsylvania)
- College: Franklin & Marshall
- NFL draft: 1986: undrafted

Career history

Playing
- Philadelphia Eagles (1987)

Coaching
- J. P. McCaskey HS (Asst.); Franklin & Marshall (1991–1995) (WR)

Awards and highlights
- All-Centennial Conference (1985)

Career NFL statistics
- Punt returns: 2
- Return yards: 13
- Stats at Pro Football Reference

Thomas Paul Caterbone (June 29, 1964 – April 29, 1996) was an American professional football defensive back and coach. He played in the National Football League as a replacement player for the Philadelphia Eagles.

== College career ==
Caterbone played four seasons at Franklin & Marshall College as a defensive back, return specialist and running back. He was named an Eastern College Athletic Conference All-Star and All-Centennial Conference as a senior. Franklin & Marshall awards the Thomas Caterbone '86 Memorial Award annually to the Diplomat player who "best exemplifies Tom Caterbone's love of football, the spirit of competition and enthusiasm for the game".

== Professional and coaching career ==
Following graduation Caterbone played for Harrisburg Patriots, a semi-professional team. He was signed by the Philadelphia Eagles in October 1987 as a replacement player during the 1987 NFL players strike and played in two games, returning two punts for 13 yards. Caterbone became a coach at J. P. McCaskey High School in Lancaster and later returned to Franklin & Marshall as a wide receivers coach. He also continued to play semi-professional football until 1995.

== Personal life ==
Caterbone's older brother, Michael, also played defensive back at Franklin & Marshall and was also a replacement player during the 1987 season as a member of the Miami Dolphins as well as in the Canadian Football League. The Caterbone brothers are the only Franklin & Marshall football players to play in an NFL game since 1950. Caterbone died of an apparent suicide on April 29, 1996. "Tommy's Field", part of Amos Herr Park in East Hempfield Township, Pennsylvania, is named in honor of Caterbone.
