= Edgewater High School =

Location
- 3100 Edgewater Drive; Orlando, Florida 32804; United States; 28°34′50″N 81°23′25″W

Information
- School type: Public, high school
- Established: 1952
- School district: Orange County Public Schools
- Superintendent: Barbara Jenkins
- Principal: Dr. Alex Jackson
- Teaching staff: 87.00 (FTE)
- Grades: 9–12
- Enrollment: 2,011 (2023-2024)
- Student to teacher ratio: 23.11
- Campus size: 52 acres
- Campus type: Urban
- Colors: Red and White
- Mascot: Edgar the Eagle
- Nickname: Eagles
- Team name: Edgewater Eagles
- Rival: William R. Boone High School, Winter Park High School, Jones High School, Apopka High School.
- Yearbook: Odasagiah
- Website: edgewaterhs.ocps.net

Edgewater High School is a public secondary school located in the College Park section of Orlando, Florida. It is operated by the Orange County Public Schools system. The athletic teams are known as the Fighting Eagles, with colors red and white.

== History ==
In 1950, the School Board of Orange County, Florida, unveiled plans to build two new high schools in Orlando. These two schools were built from the same architectural plans and both were opened on the same day, Tuesday, September 2, 1952. The first was named Lake Lancaster High School then changed to William R. Boone High School and the second was named Edgewater High School. Boone was named for William R. Boone, a long-serving principal of the original Orlando High School (which is now Howard Middle School, on Robinson Street in downtown Orlando, near Lake Eola). The campuses of Boone and Edgewater contained identical buildings, but their arrangement on each campus was different. Edgewater's first principal was Mr. Orville R. Davis, a veteran of Orange County Public Schools, who was once the principal of the original Memorial Junior High School (now Memorial Middle School), also in Orlando.

Edgewater and Boone were originally to be named Lake Lancaster High school and Edgewater High School, respectively. However, William R. Boone, who was to be principal of Lake Lancaster, died the summer before the schools opened. South High was renamed in his memory. Edgewater was always named for the road it was built beside, Edgewater Drive.

Edgewater High School has recently been renovated into a three-story facility on the land which previously held mobile homes a dinner theater, bank, and the best diner in town Princeton Diner to the North of the old campus, most of which will be destroyed to create a new sports field. The remaining buildings will undergo a refurbishment to house freshmen and will be available by the start of the 2011–2012 school year. The new facility is mostly indoors to allow for overall protection from the elements and a more secure campus, and uses new technology such as new Promethean boards and an all new auditorium. Students were given access to the facility on the first day back to class in 2011 after winter break, and both staff and students are currently working on adjusting to the new facility.

== Demographics ==
The demographic breakdown of the 2,034 students enrolled in 2016–17 was as follows:

Gender

- Male – 53.4%
- Female – 46.6%

Race and Ethnicity

- Black or African American – 49.5%
- White – 26.9%
- Hispanic and Latino – 18.6%
- Two or More Races – 2.4%
- Asian – 2.3%
- American Indian and Alaska Native – 0.2%
- Native Hawaiian and Other Pacific Islander – 0.1%

63.4% of the students were eligible for free or reduced price lunch. Edgewater High School is a Title I school.

== Athletics ==
Edgewater High School has various varsity sports teams, including baseball, basketball, bowling, cheering, cross country, flag football, football, golf, lacrosse, rowing, soccer, softball, swimming, tennis, track & field, volleyball, water polo, weightlifting, and wrestling.

State Championships

- Boys' Basketball – 1976, 2004
- Girls' Basketball – 2007, 2012, 2013, 2014
- Boys' Cross Country – 1994

== Notable alumni ==
- CJ Baxter (2023), college football running back for the Texas Longhorns
- Mike Brewster, former NFL and currently a coach.
- Greg Cleveland (1982), former NFL football player
- Marquis Daniels (1999 - transferred), former NBA basketball player and current coach for Auburn Tigers
- Howie Dorough, singer-songwriter
- Mike Freeman (2006), baseball player
- Davis Gaines (1972), actor
- RJ Harvey (2019), NFL football running back for the Denver Broncos
- John Hunt, former NFL football player
- Kenny Ingram (2004), former NFL player and coach
- Karl Joseph (2012), NFL football player
- Sharon Lechter, author
- Norm Lewis (1981), actor
- Quincy McDuffie (2009), football player
- Alexis Prince (2012), WNBA basketball player
- Anfernee Simons (2017), NBA basketball player
- Sharon Vaughn, singer-songwriter
- Darius Washington Jr. (2004), basketball player
- Mike Sims-Walker, former NFL football player
