= John Hunt (American football) =

American football player and coach (born 1962)

No. 79, 72
- Position: Guard

Personal information
- Born: November 6, 1962 (age 64); Orlando, Florida, U.S.
- Listed height: 6 ft 4 in (1.93 m)
- Listed weight: 254 lb (115 kg)

Career information
- High school: Edgewater (Orlando)
- College: Florida
- NFL draft: 1984: 11th round, 304th overall pick

Career history

Playing
- Dallas Cowboys (1984); Tampa Bay Buccaneers (1987)

Coaching
- University of Florida (1999–2001) Offensive line coach; Washington Redskins (2002–2003) Assistant offensive line coach; University of South Carolina (2004–2008) Offensive line coach; Woodward Academy (2011–present) Head coach

Awards and highlights
- Second-team All-SEC (1983)

Career NFL statistics
- Games played: 3
- Games started: 1
- Stats at Pro Football Reference

John Stephen Hunt (born November 6, 1962) is an American former professional football player who was a guard in the National Football League (NFL) for the Dallas Cowboys and Tampa Bay Buccaneers. He played college football for the Florida Gators.

== Early life ==
Hunt attended Edgewater High School, where he played football and baseball. He accepted a football scholarship from the University of Florida.

He became a regular starter at left guard as a junior. Even though he broke a hand on October 8, 1983, against Vanderbilt University, he started the final 22 games of his college career. As a senior, he was considered a key player in the team's improved running game.

== Professional career ==
=== Dallas Cowboys ===
Hunt was selected by the Dallas Cowboys in the ninth round (232nd overall) of the 1984 NFL draft. On September 28, he was placed on the injured reserve list with a back injury. He returned to the roster in week eight, but wasn't active until the twelfth game, replacing an injured Howard Richards.

In the Thanksgiving game against the New England Patriots, he was forced to play at right guard when starter Kurt Petersen injured an ankle in the first half. He performed well the rest of the contest and started the next week against the Philadelphia Eagles. He was released on August 27, 1985.

=== Tampa Bay Buccaneers ===
After the players went on a strike on the third week of the 1987 season, those games were canceled (reducing the 16 game season to 15) and the NFL decided that the games would be played with replacement players. Hunt was signed to be a part of the Tampa Bay Buccaneers replacement team. He was a backup player, before being released at the end of the strike.

== Coaching career ==
Hunt coached high school football from 1992 to 1998. In 1999, he was named the offensive line coach for the University of Florida. In 2002, he was named the offensive line coach for the Washington Redskins. In 2004, he was named the offensive line coach for the University of South Carolina and remained there until 2008.

Hunt is currently the head football coach and a Personal Fitness teacher at Woodward Academy. He was named the AAAA Georgia Football Coach of the Year for 2014, when for the first time since 1997, Woodward advanced to the state championship semifinals after capturing the region championship.
