= Troy Stradford =

American football player (born 1964)

No. 23, 25, 21, 33
- Positions: Running back, wide receiver

Personal information
- Born: September 11, 1964 (age 62); Elizabeth, New Jersey, U.S.
- Listed height: 5 ft 9 in (1.75 m)
- Listed weight: 191 lb (87 kg)

Career information
- High school: Linden (Linden, New Jersey)
- College: Boston College
- NFL draft: 1987: 4th round, 99th overall pick

Career history
- Miami Dolphins (1987–1990); Kansas City Chiefs (1991); Los Angeles Rams (1992); Detroit Lions (1992)

Awards and highlights
- NFL Offensive Rookie of the Year (1987); PFWA All-Rookie Team (1987); Second-team All-East (1986); Japan Bowl MVP (1987)

Career NFL statistics
- Rushing yards: 1,380
- Rushing average: 3.9
- Rushing touchdowns: 10
- Stats at Pro Football Reference

Troy Edwin Stradford (born September 11, 1964) is an American former professional football player who was a running back in the National Football League (NFL). He was selected by the Miami Dolphins in the fourth round of the 1987 NFL draft with the 99th overall pick. Stradford won the 1987 Offensive Rookie of the Year Award for the Dolphins and played for Miami until the end of the 1990 season. He lasted just two more years in the NFL and played for the Kansas City Chiefs, the Detroit Lions, and the Los Angeles Rams from 1991 to 1992.

Stradford grew up in Linden, New Jersey, and played both basketball and football at Linden High School.

Stradford currently works as a Sports talk show host on WFTL 640 Sports radio weekdays from 10AM-12PM and as the host of the Gameday Insiders heard weekends on WFTL 640 and WFTL 850 in Fort Lauderdale, Florida.

== Professional statistics ==
Year	Team	Games		Rushing					Receiving				
Year	Team	GP	GS	Att	Yds	Avg	Lng	TD	Rec	Yds	Avg	Lng	TD
1987	Miami Dolphins	12	5	145	619	4.3	51	6	48	457	9.5	34	1
1988	Miami Dolphins	15	6	95	335	3.5	18	2	56	426	7.6	36	1
1989	Miami Dolphins	7	4	66	240	3.6	13	1	25	233	9.3	32	0
1990	Miami Dolphins	14	0	37	138	3.7	15	1	30	257	8.6	23	0
1991	Kansas City Chiefs	10	0	1	7	7.0	7	0	9	91	10.1	17	0
1992	Detroit Lions	6	0	9	29	3.2	11	0	2	15	7.5	12	0
1992	Los Angeles Rams	2	0	3	12	4.0	5	0	0	0	0.0	0	0
TOTAL		66	15	356	1,380	3.9	51	10	170	1,479	8.7	36	2
