= Barry Pryor =

American football player (1946–2018)

- Pryor, circa 1970

No. 31
- Position: Running back

Personal information
- Born: March 4, 1946; Pittsburgh, Pennsylvania, U.S.
- Died: January 28, 2018 (aged 71)
- Listed height: 6 ft 0 in (1.83 m)
- Listed weight: 215 lb (98 kg)

Career information
- High school: South Hills Catholic
- College: Boston University
- AFL draft: 1969: undrafted

Career history
- Miami Dolphins (1969–1970)
- Stats at Pro Football Reference

Barry Lewis Pryor (March 4, 1946 – January 28, 2018) was an American professional football player who was a running back for the Miami Dolphins in the American Football League (AFL) and National Football League (NFL). He played college football and basketball for the Boston University Terriers.

== Early life ==
Barry Lewis Pryor was born on March 4, 1946, in Pittsburgh, Pennsylvania. He played high school football at South Hills Catholic High School as a quarterback, earning All-City honors.

== College career ==
Pryor enrolled at Boston University for the 1964 season but left the school before ever playing for the Terriers. By February 1965, he was delivering inter-office mail for a gas company. He enrolled at Ohio University to play for the Bobcats during the 1965 season. In 1966, Pryor transferred back to Boston University but had to sit out the 1966 season due to transfer rules. He played football for the Terriers from 1967 to 1968. He also played college basketball for Boston University during the 1967–68 season as a guard, averaging 4.3 points-per-game and 2.0 rebounds-per-game in 23 games.

== Professional career ==
Pryor signed with the Miami Dolphins of the American Football League (AFL) in April 1969 after going undrafted. The eight plays he participated in during the preseason game on August 2 against the Minnesota Vikings were credited to Gary Tucker, who was not even on the team anymore. Pryor and Tucker had worn the same jersey number. On August 28, the Fort Lauderdale News said that Pryor was a "sure winner of the Obscurity Award" for surviving several rounds of roster cuts despite being a relatively unknown player. Pryor played in all 14 games for the Dolphins in 1969, mostly on special teams. He recorded four solo tackles, two assisted tackles, and two receptions for negative three yards.

Pryor was cut by the Dolphins near the end of the 1970 preseason after being beat out by Hubert Ginn. Pryor was then signed to the Dolphins' taxi squad, where he emulated opponents during practices. In late November 1970, after Paul Warfield suffered an injury, Pryor was promoted to the active roster to contribute on special teams. He appeared in two games for Miami during the 1970 season and carried the ball twice for no yards. On September 7, 1971, Pryor was waived by the Dolphins.

== Personal life ==
Pryor was later a professor at the Community College of Allegheny County. He died on January 28, 2018.
