= Charles Bennett (defensive end, born 1963) =

American football player (born 1963)

No. 75, 93
- Position: Defensive end

Personal information
- Born: February 6, 1963 (age 63); Alligator, Mississippi, U.S.
- Listed height: 6 ft 5 in (1.96 m)
- Listed weight: 257 lb (117 kg)

Career information
- High school: Coahoma County
- College: Louisiana
- NFL draft: 1985: 7th round, 190th overall pick

Career history
- Chicago Bears (1985)*; Saskatchewan Roughriders (1985); Dallas Cowboys (1986)*; Miami Dolphins (1987); Cleveland Browns (1989)*
- * Offseason or practice squad member only
- Stats at Pro Football Reference

Charles Anthony Bennett (born February 9, 1963) is an American former professional football player who was a defensive end for the Miami Dolphins of the National Football League (NFL). He played college football for the Louisiana Ragin' Cajuns. Bennett was selected by the Chicago Bears in the seventh round of the 1985 NFL draft. He played one game for the Saskatchewan Roughriders of the Canadian Football League (CFL) in 1985, and played three games for Miami in 1987.

Bennett met his wife, Patricia (née Phaneuf), when he was playing in Saskatchewan. Their son Anthony became a CFL defensive lineman.
