= Victor Morris =

American professional basketball player (born 1985)

Victor "Money" Morris (born on September 1, 1985, in Minden, Louisiana) is an American professional basketball player currently playing for the Windsor Express of the National Basketball League of Canada. The 6 ft 1 in (1.85 m), 185 lb (84 kg) point guard graduated from Inkster High School in Inkster, Michigan, and chose to play at Cleveland State University after having received scholarships from other major universities. After graduating from Cleveland State, Morris played his first professional season for TS Goeppingen, in Germany, a team that he led to a German BBW Cup Championship.

== College ==
Victor had a successful college career in which he led the Cleveland State Vikings in many categories and finished in the top 20 in CSU history in minutes played, free-throw percentage, and assist. As a senior Vic averaged 16 points per game and 4 assist per game before suffering a broken foot. After his senior season in April 2007, Vic participated in the Kentucky Top 60 College Senior Showcase where he was named to the All-Showcase team after averaging 25 points and 7 assist per game. Vic also played in the Kentucky Pro Am in June 2007 and led his team to a 3rd place finish.

== Professional ==
=== 2007-2008 season ===
Playing his first professional season for TS Goeppingen, Vic averaged 20.3 points, 5.0 rebounds, and 6.0 assist per game. Victor had an outstanding rookie campaign as he accomplished the following:

- Scored a career high 44 points in the German BBW Cup Championship
- Set a career high in assist with 13 against Rastatt
- Ranked top 5 in scoring in the Regionalliga (South-West)
- Led his team to the 2008 German BBW Cup Championship
- Selected as a Regionalliga All-Star
- Earned the German BBW Cup Final Four MVP

=== 2008-2009 season ===
Victor was scheduled to begin his second season with TS Goeppingen on 10/25/08. However, due to his exceptional accomplishments as a rookie, he was selected to be the starting point guard for Porvoon Tarmo of Finland. Morris adjusted nicely to the Top League and became a fan favorite for his high level of play. On the season Morris averaged 14.7 points, 2.5 assist, and 3.5 rebounds per game.

=== 2011-2012 season ===
For the 2011-12 season, Morris played for the National Basketball League of Canada as a member of the Moncton Miracles, where he averaged 9.3 points, 1.6 rebounds, and 3.9 assists during his 19 games with the team.

=== 2012-13 season ===
For the 2012-13 season, Morris is replaying in the NBL, this time as a member of the expansion Windsor Express franchise.
