= Gary Tucker =

American football player (1945–2025)

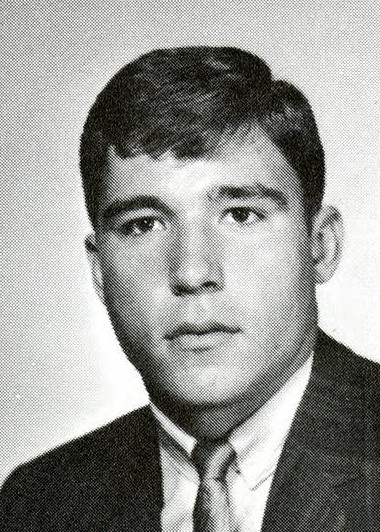
- Tucker in 1966

No. 27
- Position: Running back

Personal information
- Born: February 19, 1945; Shelbyville, Tennessee, U.S.
- Died: February 4, 2025 (aged 79); Ooltewah, Tennessee, U.S.
- Listed height: 5 ft 11 in (1.80 m)
- Listed weight: 205 lb (93 kg)

Career information
- High school: Brainerd (Chattanooga, Tennessee)
- College: Chattanooga
- AFL draft: 1967: 5th round, 129th overall pick

Career history
- Miami Dolphins (1967–1968); Miami Dolphins (1970)*
- * Offseason or practice squad member only
- Stats at Pro Football Reference

William Gary Tucker (February 19, 1945 – February 4, 2025) was an American professional football player who was a running back for the Miami Dolphins of the American Football League (AFL). He played college football for the Chattanooga Moccasins and was selected by the Dolphins in the fifth round of the 1967 NFL/AFL draft.

== Early life ==
William Gary Tucker was born on February 19, 1945, in Shelbyville, Tennessee. He attended Brainerd High School in Chattanooga, Tennessee.

== College career ==
Tucker enrolled at Vanderbilt University to play college football for the Commodores. He was on the freshmen team in 1963. In 1964, he transferred to the University of Chattanooga, where he was a three-year letterman for the Moccasins from 1964 to 1966. As a senior in 1966, Tucker totaled 124 rushing attempts for 417 yards and one touchdown, 13 receptions for 89 yards, and 11 kickoff returns for 247 yards while being bothered by a sprained ankle for part of the year.

== Professional career ==
Tucker was selected by the Dolphins in the fifth round, with the 129th overall pick, of the 1967 NFL/AFL draft. He spent the 1967 season on the team's taxi squad. He played in all 14 games in 1968, recording four carries for 13 yards, three kick returns for 54 yards, five punt returns for 40 yards, one fumble, and two fumble recoveries. Tucker did not report to training camp in July 1969, instead deciding to go into private business. The eight plays Dolphins player Barry Pryor participated in during a preseason game on August 2, 1969, were credited to Tucker, who was not even on the team anymore. Pryor and Tucker had worn the same jersey number. Tucker later decided to re-sign with the Dolphins on April 15, 1970. He was waived on August 13, 1970.

== Personal life ==
After his football career, Tucker served in the United States Army Reserve and the Tennessee National Guard. He was also a pharmacist, graduating first in his class from the Mercer College of Pharmacy. He owned the Shallowford Prescription Center for 20 years. Tucker died on February 4, 2025, in Ooltewah, Tennessee.
