= Todd Feldman =

American gridiron football player (born 1962)

No. 82
- Position: Wide receiver

Personal information
- Born: August 7, 1962 (age 64); Philadelphia, Pennsylvania, U.S.
- Listed height: 5 ft 10 in (1.78 m)
- Listed weight: 184 lb (83 kg)

Career information
- High school: Haverford (PA)
- College: Kent State
- NFL draft: 1985: undrafted

Career history
- Ottawa Rough Riders (1985)*; Miami Dolphins (1987)
- * Offseason or practice squad member only
- Stats at Pro Football Reference

Todd Mitchell Feldman (born August 7, 1962) is an American former professional football player who was a wide receiver for the Miami Dolphins of the National Football League (NFL). He played college football for the Kent State Golden Flashes. He was a replacement player for the Dolphins in 1987.
