= Bill Bealles =

American football player (1963–2023)

No. 65
- Position: Tackle

Personal information
- Born: June 11, 1963; Steubenville, Ohio, U.S.
- Died: October 31, 2023 (aged 60); Minneapolis, Minnesota, U.S.
- Listed height: 6 ft 7 in (2.01 m)
- Listed weight: 290 lb (132 kg)

Career information
- High school: Victor J. Andrew (Tinley Park, Illinois)
- College: Northern Illinois (1982); Northern Iowa (1983–1985)
- NFL draft: 1986: undrafted

Career history
- New Orleans Saints (1986–1987)*; Miami Dolphins (1987)
- * Offseason or practice squad member only

Career NFL statistics
- Games played: 3
- Stats at Pro Football Reference

William John Bealles III (June 11, 1963 – October 31, 2023) was an American professional football tackle who played for the Miami Dolphins of the National Football League (NFL). He played college football at University of Northern Iowa.

He died on October 31, 2023 at the age of 60.
