= Clarence Bailey =

American football player (1963–2006)

No. 38
- Position: Running back

Personal information
- Born: March 7, 1963; Milford, Delaware, U.S.
- Died: May 29, 2006 (aged 43); Milford, Delaware, U.S.
- Listed height: 5 ft 11 in (1.80 m)
- Listed weight: 220 lb (100 kg)

Career information
- High school: Milford (DE)
- College: Wesley, Hampton
- NFL draft: 1987: undrafted

Career history
- Toronto Argonauts (1987)*; Chesapeake Bay Neptunes (1987); Miami Dolphins (1987)
- * Offseason or practice squad member only

Career NFL statistics
- Rushing yards: 55
- Rushing average: 5.5
- Stats at Pro Football Reference

Clarence J. Bailey (March 7, 1963 - May 29, 2006) was an American professional football player who was a running back for one season for the Miami Dolphins of the National Football League (NFL). He played college football at Wesley and Hampton.

== Early life ==
He was born on March 7, 1963, in Milford, Delaware, and attended Milford High School. He played one season of football in high school and had 1411 rushing yards and 17 touchdowns. He was named first-team all-conference and first-team all-state.

== College career ==
Bailey attended Wesley College, playing there from 1982 to 1983. He went to Hampton from 1984 to 1986, leading the team in punt returns as a junior and as a senior.

== Professional career ==
=== 1987 season ===
Bailey was signed by the Toronto Argonauts in 1987. He was released at roster cuts.

He also played briefly for the Chesapeake Bay Neptunes, a semi-professional team.

He was also signed by the Miami Dolphins during training camp. He was released on August 18. He was later signed as a replacement player. In his first game he had 10 rushes for 55 yards. After his first game, he did not have any more statistics. He played three games.

== Later life ==
Bailey had eight children. He died on May 29, 2006, at the age of 43. In 2008 he was inducted into the Milford Football Hall of Fame.
