= Mike Caterbone =

American gridiron football player (born 1962)

Profile
- Position: Wide receiver

Personal information
- Born: February 17, 1962 (age 64); Lancaster, Pennsylvania
- Listed height: 5 ft 11 in (1.80 m)
- Listed weight: 175 lb (79 kg)

Career information
- High school: J. P. McCaskey (Lancaster, Pennsylvania)
- College: Franklin & Marshall
- NFL draft: 1984: undrafted

Career history
- Arizona Outlaws (1984)*; Ottawa Rough Riders (1985–1986); Miami Dolphins (1987–1988)
- * Offseason or practice squad member only

Awards and highlights
- All-Centennial Conference (1983); 2× All-MAC (1981, 1982)

Career NFL statistics
- Receptions: 2
- Receiving yards: 46
- Receiving touchdowns: 0
- Return yards: 78
- Stats at Pro Football Reference

Michael Thomas Caterbone (born February 17, 1962) is a former gridiron football wide receiver who played in the National Football League and the Canadian Football League.

== College career ==
Caterbone played four seasons at Franklin & Marshall College as a defensive back and return specialist. He was twice named All-Middle Atlantic Conference as a sophomore and junior and was named an Eastern College Athletic Conference All-Star and All-Centennial Conference as a senior.

== Professional career ==
Caterbone was signed by the Ottawa Rough Riders of the Canadian Football League in 1985, who moved from defensive back to wide receiver. He caught 45 passes for 654 yards and five touchdowns and returned 37 punts for 328 yards and 21 kickoffs for 436 yards in 1985. He scored two touchdowns on receptions of 23 and 70 yards on August 2, 1985 against the Edmonton Eskimos. He played one game for the Rough Riders in 1986, catching two passes for 33 yards. He was signed by the Miami Dolphins in October 1987 as a replacement player during the 1987 NFL players strike. He caught two passes for 46 yards and returned nine punts, including the first in the history of Joe Robbie Stadium, for 78 yards in three games and was released when the strike ended. Caterbone was re-signed by the Dolphins during the 1988 offseason but was released during training camp.

== Personal life ==
Caterbone's younger brother, Thomas, also played defensive back at Franklin & Marshall and was also a replacement player during the 1987 season as a member of the Philadelphia Eagles. The Caterbone brothers are the only Franklin & Marshall football players to play in an NFL game since 1950.
