= Harry Galbreath =

American football player and coach (1965–2010)

No. 62, 76, 64
- Position: Guard

Personal information
- Born: January 1, 1965; Clarksville, Tennessee, U.S.
- Died: July 27, 2010 (aged 45); Mobile, Alabama, U.S.
- Listed height: 6 ft 1 in (1.85 m)
- Listed weight: 280 lb (127 kg)

Career information
- High school: Clarksville
- College: Tennessee
- NFL draft: 1988: 8th round, 212th overall pick

Career history
- Miami Dolphins (1988–1992); Green Bay Packers (1993–1995); New York Jets (1996)

Awards and highlights
- Second-team All-American (1987); Jacobs Blocking Trophy (1987); First-team All-SEC (1987); Second-team All-SEC (1986)

Career NFL statistics
- Games played: 141
- Games started: 131
- Fumble recoveries: 1
- Stats at Pro Football Reference

Harry Curtis Galbreath (January 1, 1965 – July 27, 2010) was an American professional football player who played several seasons in the National Football League (NFL), initially with the Miami Dolphins, and later with the Green Bay Packers and New York Jets. The 6-foot 1-inch 295-pound Galbreath attended the University of Tennessee and starred as an offensive guard for the Volunteers after graduating in 1983 from Clarksville High School in Clarksville, Tennessee.

Galbreath played in every game of his four-year career as a Volunteer (1984–87), which included being in the starting lineup his last three years. Volunteers' coach Johnny Majors once said that Galbreath was the best run blocker he had ever coached. On the field, Galbreath was aggressive and fundamentally sound, while off the field he garnered first-team All-SEC and first-team All-American honors as a senior in 1987. He also was awarded the prestigious Jacobs Award, given annually to the SEC's top lineman. In 1991, Galbreath was honored further for his career in the orange and white by being named to Tennessee's 100 Year All-Time Team.

After graduating in 1988 with a degree in human services, Galbreath was an 8th-round draft pick (212th overall) of the Miami Dolphins in the NFL draft. Galbreath was named to the NFL All-Rookie Team in 1988 and played five seasons with the Dolphins before moving on. Galbreath signed with the Green Bay Packers after the 1992 season and played three seasons in Wisconsin (1993–95), then headed east to the New York Jets, where he played one more season (1996) before retiring.

Upon his retirement from the NFL, Galbreath was named offensive line coach at Austin Peay State University, where he remained for two years before moving on to a five-year stint in the same capacity at Tennessee State University. In 2005, he was named offensive line coach at Hampton University. In 2007, he returned to the Volunteers as an associate in the strength and conditioning program.

Off the field, Galbreath was active with the National Incarcerated Parents and Families Network (NIPFN), a non-profit organization that provides support and education for families of incarcerated parents.

Galbreath died on July 27, 2010, in Mobile, Alabama.
