= Greg Cleveland =

American football player (1963–2019)

No. 61
- Position: Defensive tackle

Personal information
- Born: August 19, 1963; Winter Park, Florida
- Died: January 8, 2019 (aged 55); Jamaica
- Listed height: 6 ft 5 in (1.96 m)
- Listed weight: 295 lb (134 kg)

Career information
- High school: Edgewater
- College: Florida

Career history
- Orlando Renegades (1986)*; Miami Dolphins (1987)
- * Offseason or practice squad member only
- Stats at Pro Football Reference

Gregory Leon Cleveland (August 19, 1963 – January 8, 2019) was an American football defensive tackle who played for the Miami Dolphins of the National Football League (NFL). He played college football at University of Florida.

== Early life and education ==
Greg Cleveland was born on August 19, 1963, in Winter Park, Florida. He went to high school at Edgewater before playing college football at Florida. During his freshman year he was the backup offensive lineman to Dan Fike. He moved to defensive end in his sophomore year. At the start of his junior year he was overweight and subsequently suspended by the coach. He sat out for the entire season. Cleveland was moved back to offensive lineman in 1985 to replace Lomas Brown, considered one of the best Florida linemen in history. He played three games before suffering a season-ending knee injury. Rather than pursue a redshirt, Cleveland opted to try professional football.

== Professional career ==
After his time at Florida, Cleveland had a short stint with the Orlando Renegades of the United States Football League (USFL). But the season was canceled before he got to play. In 1987, he was signed by the Miami Dolphins of the National Football League (NFL) as a replacement player during the 24-day NFLPA strike. He played in two games before being released. He did not play afterwards.

== Death ==
Cleveland died from a heart attack while at a Jamaican hospital on January 8, 2019, at the age of 55.
