= Trell Hooper =

American football player (born 1961)

No. 45
- Position: Defensive back

Personal information
- Born: December 22, 1961 (age 64); Brownsville, Tennessee, U.S.
- Listed height: 5 ft 11 in (1.80 m)
- Listed weight: 182 lb (83 kg)

Career information
- High school: Jackson (TN) Central Merry
- College: Memphis
- NFL draft: 1986: 8th round, 198th overall pick

Career history
- Indianapolis Colts (1986)*; Miami Dolphins (1987)
- * Offseason or practice squad member only

Career NFL statistics
- Interceptions: 2
- Fumble recoveries: 1
- Touchdowns: 1
- Stats at Pro Football Reference

John Lutrell Hooper (born December 22, 1961) is an American former professional football player who was a defensive back in the National Football League (NFL). He played college football for the Memphis Tigers before being selected by the Indianapolis Colts in the eighth round of the 1986 NFL draft. He played for the Miami Dolphins in 1987.
