= Ike Readon =

American football player (born 1963)

No. 79
- Position: Defensive tackle

Personal information
- Born: May 16, 1963 (age 63); Miami, Florida, U.S.
- Listed height: 6 ft 0 in (1.83 m)
- Listed weight: 273 lb (124 kg)

Career information
- High school: South Miami
- College: Hampton
- NFL draft: 1986: 10th round, 257th overall pick

Career history
- Kansas City Chiefs (1986)*; Miami Dolphins (1987)
- * Offseason or practice squad member only
- Stats at Pro Football Reference

Ike Readon (born May 16, 1963) is an American former professional football player who was a defensive tackle for the Miami Dolphins of the National Football League (NFL) in 1987. He played college football for the Hampton Pirates.
