= Greg Ours =

American football player (born 1963)

No. 63
- Position: Guard

Personal information
- Born: October 29, 1963 (age 63); Hebron, Ohio, U.S.
- Listed height: 6 ft 5 in (1.96 m)
- Listed weight: 279 lb (127 kg)

Career information
- High school: Lakewood (Hebron)
- College: Muskingum
- NFL draft: 1986: undrafted

Career history
- Orlando Renegades (1986)*; Miami Dolphins (1987); New England Patriots (1988)*
- * Offseason or practice squad member only
- Stats at Pro Football Reference

Gregory William Ours (born October 29, 1963) is an American former professional football player who was a guard for three games with the Miami Dolphins of the National Football League (NFL) in the 1987. Ours also spent time with both the Orlando Renegades of the United States Football League and the New England Patriots. He played college football for the Muskingum Fighting Muskies.
