= Ronald Scott (American football) =

American football player (born 1963)

No. 33
- Position: Running back

Personal information
- Born: March 3, 1963 (age 63); Thibodaux, Louisiana, U.S.
- Listed height: 5 ft 11 in (1.80 m)
- Listed weight: 200 lb (91 kg)

Career information
- High school: Thibodaux
- College: Southern (1982–1986)
- NFL draft: 1987: undrafted

Career history
- St. Louis Cardinals (1987)*; Miami Dolphins (1987)
- * Offseason or practice squad member only
- Stats at Pro Football Reference

Arthur Ronald Scott (born March 3, 1963) is an American former professional football running back who played for the Miami Dolphins of the National Football League (NFL). He played college football for the Southern Jaguars.

== Early life ==
Arthur Ronald Scott was born on March 3, 1963, in Thibodaux, Louisiana. He had been a Miami Dolphins fan since third grade. He played high school football at Thibodaux High School. Scott rushed for over 1,200 yards and 15 touchdowns as a senior in 1981, earning All-State and The Daily Comet All-Parish offensive MVP honors.

== College career ==
Scott enrolled at Southern University to play college football for the Jaguars. He redshirted the 1982 season. He became the starting running back in 1985. Through October 10, 1986, Scott had 77 rushes for 445 yards and four touchdowns during the 1986 season while also catching six passes for 50 yards and two touchdowns. He was also a "deadly" kick returner. He majored in business management at Southern.

== Professional career ==
Scott signed with the St. Louis Cardinals in May 1987 after going undrafted in the 1987 NFL draft. He was released on July 26, 1987, during training camp. The same day, it was reported that he had signed with the Miami Dolphins. Scott was released by the Dolphins on August 19 after the first game of the 1987 preseason. On September 22, he was re-signed by Miami during the 1987 NFL players strike. He played in all three strike games, starting two, for the Dolphins, rushing 47 times for 199 yards and three touchdowns while also catching two passes for seven yards on four targets and returning one kick for 22 yards. Scott was the first Dolphin to score three rushing touchdowns in one game since Larry Csonka in 1979. Scott was released on October 26, 1987, a week after the strike ended.
