= Scott Kehoe =

American football player (born 1964)

No. 71
- Position: Tackle

Personal information
- Born: September 20, 1964 (age 62); Oak Lawn, Illinois, U.S.
- Listed height: 6 ft 4 in (1.93 m)
- Listed weight: 282 lb (128 kg)

Career information
- High school: Oak Lawn
- College: Illinois
- NFL draft: 1987: undrafted

Career history
- Miami Dolphins (1987)

Awards and highlights
- Second-team All-Big Ten (1986)

Career NFL statistics
- Games played: 3
- Stats at Pro Football Reference

Scott Anton Kehoe (born September 20, 1964) is an American former professional football player who was a tackle for the Miami Dolphins of the National Football League (NFL). He played college football for the Illinois Fighting Illini.
