= Joel Williams (tight end) =

American football player (born 1965)

No. 88
- Position: Tight end

Personal information
- Born: March 16, 1965 (age 61); Pittsburgh, Pennsylvania, U.S.
- Listed height: 6 ft 3 in (1.91 m)
- Listed weight: 242 lb (110 kg)

Career information
- High school: Gateway (Monroeville, Pennsylvania)
- College: Notre Dame (1983–1986)
- NFL draft: 1987: 8th round, 210th overall pick

Career history
- Miami Dolphins (1987)
- Stats at Pro Football Reference

Joel David Williams (born March 16, 1965) is an American former professional football tight end who played one season with the Miami Dolphins of the National Football League (NFL). He was selected by the Dolphins in the eighth round of the 1987 NFL draft after playing college football at the University of Notre Dame.

== Early life ==
Joel David Williams was born on March 16, 1965, in Pittsburgh, Pennsylvania. He attended Gateway High School in Monroeville, Pennsylvania.

== College career ==
Williams played college football for the Notre Dame Fighting Irish of the University of Notre Dame from 1983 to 1986. He caught one pass for six yards in 1983, two passes for 17 yards in 1984, five passes for 63 yards and one touchdown in 1985, and 13 passes for 138 yards and three touchdowns in 1986.

== Professional career ==
Williams was selected by the Miami Dolphins in the eighth round, with the 210th overall pick, of the 1987 NFL draft. He officially signed with the team on July 22. He played in the first two games of the 1987 season. He did not play in the following three games due to the 1987 NFL players strike. He was activated on October 20, after the strike ended. Williams then appeared in the team's sixth game of the season before being released on November 2, 1987.
