= Brian Kinchen =

American football player (born 1965)

No. 88, 48, 46
- Positions: Tight end, long snapper

Personal information
- Born: August 6, 1965 (age 61); Baton Rouge, Louisiana, U.S.
- Listed height: 6 ft 2 in (1.88 m)
- Listed weight: 240 lb (109 kg)

Career information
- High school: LSU Laboratory (Baton Rouge)
- College: LSU
- NFL draft: 1988: 12th round, 320th overall pick

Career history
- Miami Dolphins (1988–1990); Green Bay Packers (1991)*; Cleveland Browns (1991–1995); Baltimore Ravens (1996–1998); Carolina Panthers (1999–2000); New England Patriots (2003)
- * Offseason or practice squad member only

Awards and highlights
- Super Bowl champion (XXXVIII); 2× Second-team All-SEC (1986, 1987)

Career NFL statistics
- Receptions: 160
- Receiving yards: 1,648
- Receiving touchdowns: 7
- Stats at Pro Football Reference

Brian Douglas Kinchen (born August 6, 1965) is an American former professional football player who was a tight end and long snapper in the National Football League (NFL) for the Miami Dolphins, Cleveland Browns, Baltimore Ravens, Carolina Panthers and New England Patriots. He played college football for the LSU Tigers.

== Early life ==
Kinchen was born in Baton Rouge to parents Gaynell "Gus" Kinchen and Tori Kinchen. He attended and played football at University High School. His father was a member of the 1958 LSU Tigers football team and one of the famed Chinese Bandits.

== College career ==
At Louisiana State University, Kinchen was an All-SEC tight end. He tallied 523 yards and six touchdowns on 48 receptions over 33 career games.

== Professional career ==
=== Miami Dolphins (1988–1990) ===
In 1988, the Miami Dolphins selected Kinchen in the 12th round of the 1988 NFL draft with the 320th overall pick. In three seasons, he caught two passes for 15 yards over 36 games.

=== Cleveland Browns/Baltimore Ravens (1991–1998) ===
In 1991, Kinchen signed with the Cleveland Browns where he played for head coach Bill Belichick. Over the next five seasons, he played in all but five regular season games (75 total). His best seasons were from 1993 to 1995 when he caught 73 passes for 795 yards and three touchdowns in 35 starts.

Kinchen was a member of the inaugural Baltimore Ravens team in 1996 which resulted from the Cleveland Browns relocating to Baltimore. In 1996, he had his best season as a tight end with 55 receptions for 581 yards (both career highs) and one touchdown. In three years with the Ravens, Kinchen totaled 79 catches for 786 yards and two touchdowns.

=== Carolina Panthers (1998–2000) ===
In his two seasons with the Carolina Panthers, Kinchen spent most of his time at long snapper and on special teams. As a tight end, he had six catches for 52 yards and one touchdown. After suffering an injury, he was released at the end of the 2000 season.

=== New England Patriots (2003) ===
In 2003, Kinchen came out of retirement to replace injured New England Patriots long snappers Lonie Paxton and Sean McDermott. He joined the team with two regular season games in the season and continued that role throughout the playoffs. With 0:09 left to play, Kinchen snapped the game-winning field goal in Super Bowl XXXVIII.

== Personal life ==
Kinchen lives in Baton Rouge, where he and his wife Lori have raised their four sons. His brother Todd also played in the NFL. His sons Austin and Hunter Kinchen were long snappers on the LSU football team. Both Brian's mother Toni and his wife Lori were LSU cheerleaders.

Since retiring from football, Kinchen has spent time as a high school football coach and was a volunteer coach for Nick Saban's 2004 national championship team at LSU. He currently serves as a college football analyst for ESPN. He was also previously a commentator for ESPNU, but was suspended after making a comment during a game that receivers needed to use their "tender" hands to "caress" the ball, and then calling the comment "kind of gay."
