= Mark Konecny =

American football player (born 1963)

No. 41, 35
- Position: Running back

Personal information
- Born: April 2, 1963 (age 63); Chicago, Illinois, U.S.
- Listed height: 5 ft 11 in (1.80 m)
- Listed weight: 197 lb (89 kg)

Career information
- High school: Muskegon (MI) Mona Shores
- College: Alma
- NFL draft: 1985: undrafted

Career history
- Toronto Argonauts (1985); Miami Dolphins (1987); New York Jets (1988)*; Philadelphia Eagles (1988); New York Jets (1989)*
- * Offseason or practice squad member only
- Stats at Pro Football Reference

Mark Konecny (born April 2, 1963) is an American former professional football player who was a running back in the National Football League (NFL). He played college football for the Alma Scots. He played in the NFL for the Miami Dolphins in 1987 and for the Philadelphia Eagles in 1988.
