= Derek Wimberly =

American football player (born 1964)

No. 78
- Position: Defensive end

Personal information
- Born: January 4, 1964 (age 62); Miami, Florida, U.S.
- Listed height: 6 ft 4 in (1.93 m)
- Listed weight: 270 lb (122 kg)

Career information
- High school: American Senior
- College: Purdue
- NFL draft: 1986: undrafted

Career history
- Washington Redskins (1986)*; Miami Dolphins (1987)
- * Offseason or practice squad member only
- Stats at Pro Football Reference

Derek Nathaniel Wimberly (born January 4, 1964) is an American former professional football player who was a defensive end for the Miami Dolphins of the National Football League (NFL). He played college football for the Purdue Boilermakers.
