= Jeff Wiska =

American football player (born 1959)

No. 72, 62, 60, 74
- Position: Guard

Personal information
- Born: October 17, 1959 (age 67); Detroit, Michigan, U.S.
- Listed height: 6 ft 3 in (1.91 m)
- Listed weight: 265 lb (120 kg)

Career information
- High school: Detroit Catholic Central (Novi, Michigan)
- College: Michigan State
- NFL draft: 1982: 7th round, 186th overall pick

Career history
- New York Giants (1982); Michigan Panthers (1984); Oakland Invaders (1985); Cleveland Browns (1986); Miami Dolphins (1987); Detroit Drive (1988)

Awards and highlights
- ArenaBowl champion (1988)
- Stats at Pro Football Reference

Jeff Wiska (born October 17, 1959) is an American former professional football player who was a guard in the National Football League (NFL).

== Early life ==
Wiska graduated from Detroit Catholic Central High School and earned a scholarship to Michigan State University, where he played college football for the Michigan State Spartans as a starter at left tackle.

== Professional career ==
Wiska was selected by the New York Giants in the seventh round of the 1982 NFL draft. He was placed on injured reserve on August 9, 1982, and missed the entire season. He was released by the Giants on August 23, 1983.

Wiska then played in the United States Football League, playing for the Michigan Panthers in 1984 and the Oakland Invaders in 1985. He returned to the NFL in 1986, playing for the Cleveland Browns in 1986 and the Miami Dolphins in 1987. He finished his pro football career in 1988 with the Detroit Drive of the Arena Football League, winning ArenaBowl II.

== Personal life ==
Wiska has two sons that played collegiately: Eldest, Ryon was an All-Academic GLIAC conference offensive lineman for Hillsdale College. Youngest, Garrett Wiska was a record breaking and all GLIAC conference fullback for Wayne State University.
