= Lawrence Sampleton =

American football player (born 1959)

No. 87, 80
- Position: Tight end

Personal information
- Born: September 25, 1959 (age 67); Waelder, Texas, U.S.
- Listed height: 6 ft 5 in (1.96 m)
- Listed weight: 233 lb (106 kg)

Career information
- High school: Seguin (Seguin, Texas)
- College: Texas
- NFL draft: 1982: 2nd round, 47th overall pick

Career history
- Philadelphia Eagles (1982–1984); Miami Dolphins (1987)

Career NFL statistics
- Receptions: 11
- Receiving yards: 116
- Stats at Pro Football Reference

Lawrence Mack Sampleton Jr. (born September 25, 1959) is an American former professional football player who was a tight end in the National Football League (NFL) for the Philadelphia Eagles, from 1982 to 1984, and the Miami Dolphins in 1987. He was selected by the Eagles in the second round of the 1982 NFL draft. He played college football for the Texas Longhorns.

Sampleton currently serves on the board of directors of the Secondary School Admission Testing Board and Director of Admission and Financial Aid for the Prairie View A&M Foundation.
