= Andy Hendel =

American football player (born 1961)

No. 90
- Position: Linebacker

Personal information
- Born: March 4, 1961 (age 65); Rochester, New York, U.S.
- Listed height: 6 ft 1 in (1.85 m)
- Listed weight: 230 lb (104 kg)

Career information
- High school: Irondequoit (Rochester)
- College: NC State
- NFL draft: 1984: undrafted

Career history
- Jacksonville Bulls (1984); Miami Dolphins (1986)
- Stats at Pro Football Reference

Andy Hendel (born March 4, 1961) is an American former professional football player who was a linebacker in the National Football League (NFL). He played college football for the NC State Wolfpack. He played in the NFL for the Jacksonville Bulls in 1984 and for the Miami Dolphins in 1986.
