= Willie Beecher =

American football player (born 1963)

No. 2
- Position: Placekicker

Personal information
- Born: April 14, 1963 (age 63); El Paso, Texas, U.S.
- Listed height: 5 ft 10 in (1.78 m)
- Listed weight: 170 lb (77 kg)

Career information
- High school: Logan (Logan, Utah)
- College: Utah State
- NFL draft: 1987: undrafted

Career history
- Miami Dolphins (1987); Buffalo Bills (1987–1988)*; New York Giants (1988)*; Miami Dolphins (1988); Green Bay Packers (1989)*
- * Offseason or practice squad member only

Career NFL statistics
- Field goals: 3
- Field goal attempts: 4
- Field goal %: 75
- Longest field goal: 40
- Stats at Pro Football Reference

Willie Beecher (born April 14, 1963) is an American former professional football player who was a placekicker in the National Football League (NFL). He played college football for the Utah State Aggies.

== College career ==
Beecher served as the kicker for the Aggies at Utah State University for four seasons. He made all 64 extra point attempts and 36 of 54 field goal attempts in his college career and was named to Utah State's All-Century team in 1993.

== Professional career ==
Beecher was signed by the Miami Dolphins after the 1987 NFL draft but was cut at the end of training camp. He was re-signed by the Dolphins as a replacement player during the 1987 NFL players strike. Beecher made three of four field goal attempts in three games before he was released at the end of the strike. He was signed tot the Buffalo Bills practice squad for the remainder of the season. Beecher was released by the Bills during training camp the following season.
