= Dameon Reilly =

American football player (born 1963)

Profile
- Position: Wide receiver

Personal information
- Born: May 10, 1963 (age 63); The Bronx, New York, U.S.
- Listed height: 5 ft 11 in (1.80 m)
- Listed weight: 180 lb (82 kg)

Career information
- High school: Aviation (Queens, New York)
- College: Rhode Island
- NFL draft: 1986: undrafted

Career history
- Indianapolis Colts (1986–1987); Miami Dolphins (1987); Saskatchewan Roughriders (1988)

Awards and highlights
- 3× First-team All-Yankee Conference (1983–85)

Career NFL statistics
- Receptions: 5
- Receiving yards: 70
- Receiving touchdowns: 0
- Stats at Pro Football Reference

Dameon Reilly (born May 10, 1963) is an American former professional football player who was a wide receiver in the National Football League (NFL). He played college football for the Rhode Island Rams.

== Early life ==
Reilly was born and grew up in The Bronx, New York and attended Aviation Career & Technical Education High School in Long Island City, Queens. Reilly did not play high school football and only played the game in sandlots until college.

== College career ==
Reilly began his collegiate career at Nassau Community College, where he walked-on to the football team, before transferring to the University of Rhode Island after his freshman year. He was named first-team All-Yankee Conference in each of his three seasons with the Rams and set a conference record with 38 touchdown receptions along with 165 catches and 2,698 receiving yards.

== Professional career ==
Reilly was signed by the Indianapolis Colts as an undrafted free agent in 1986. He spent the 1986 season on injured reserve and was cut during training camp the following season. Reilly was signed by the Miami Dolphins in October 1987 as a replacement player during the 1987 NFL players strike, catching five passes for 70 yards in three games before being released after the strike ended. Reilly played for the Saskatchewan Roughriders of the Canadian Football League in 1988.
