= Laz Chavez =

American football player (born 1963)

No. 91
- Position: Linebacker

Personal information
- Born: December 20, 1963 (age 62); Port Chester, New York, U.S.
- Listed height: 6 ft 0 in (1.83 m)
- Listed weight: 220 lb (100 kg)

Career information
- High school: Port Chester
- College: Iona
- NFL draft: 1986: undrafted

Career history
- New England Patriots (1986)*; Miami Dolphins (1987)
- * Offseason or practice squad member only
- Stats at Pro Football Reference

Lazarus Emannuel Chavez (born December 20, 1963) is an American former professional football linebacker who played for the Miami Dolphins of the National Football League (NFL). He played college football for the Iona Gaels.

== Early life ==
Lazarus Emannuel Chavez was born on December 20, 1963, in Port Chester, New York. He attended Port Chester High School, earning all-conference honors in both football and wrestling. He graduated from high school in 1982.

== College career ==
Chavez enrolled at Iona University to play college football for the Gaels. He was the team's leading tackler in both 1984 and 1985. The 1985 Gaels went 0–11.

== Professional career ==
After going undrafted in the 1986 NFL draft, Chavez attended rookie minicamp on a tryout basis with the New York Giants but was not signed. He then attended the New England Patriots' rookie minicamp, and after impressing the team with his speed, hitting, and pass coverage skills, signed a contract on May 10. Chavez was released on August 4, 1986, after the first preseason game.

Chavez was signed by the Miami Dolphins on April 21, 1987. He was released on July 27 during training camp. On September 23, 1987, he signed with the Dolphins during the 1987 NFL players strike. Chavez played in all three strike games for Miami as a reserve linebacker. He was released on October 19, 1987, after the strike ended.

== Personal life ==
Chavez's brother, Mario, played college football for the Fordham Rams. Laz's son, Lazarus Gabriel Chavez, played college lacrosse for the Syracuse Orange.
