= Greg Johnson (offensive lineman) =

American football player

No. 65 – Minnesota Golden Gophers
- Position: Offensive lineman
- Class: Senior

Personal information
- Listed height: 6 ft 6 in (1.98 m)
- Listed weight: 325 lb (147 kg)

Career information
- High school: Prior Lake (Savage, Minnesota)
- College: Minnesota (2023–present)
- Stats at ESPN

Greg Johnson is an American college football offensive lineman for the Minnesota Golden Gophers.

== Early life ==
Johnson is from Prior Lake, Minnesota. He attended Prior Lake High School where he played football as a lineman, starting for three years on offense. As a senior in 2022, he helped Prior Lake to the second round of the state playoffs and was named first-team all-state. A team captain, he also posted 20 tackles while playing on defense in 2022. Johnson played in the Minnesota High School Football All-Star game and was a first-team Star Tribune All-Metro selection. Johnson was ranked a four-star recruit in the class of 2023. He committed to play college football for the Minnesota Golden Gophers.

== College career ==
Johnson began his collegiate career as an offensive guard and appeared in 11 games for the Golden Gophers as a true freshman in 2023. He made two starts, against Illinois and Michigan State. He then changed positions and was named Minnesota's starting center in 2024. Johnson started all 13 games in 2024, before returning to guard in 2025. He started every game again in 2025, making starts at three different positions and earning honorable mention All-Big Ten Conference honors after allowing only one sack. Johnson returned to Minnesota for a final season in 2026.
