= Stacy Gore =

American football player (born 1963)

No. 3
- Position: Punter

Personal information
- Born: May 20, 1963 (age 63); Jonesboro, Arkansas
- Listed height: 6 ft 0 in (1.83 m)
- Listed weight: 200 lb (91 kg)

Career information
- College: Arkansas State
- NFL draft: 1985: undrafted

Career history
- Miami Dolphins (1987)
- Stats at Pro Football Reference

Stacy Gore (born May 20, 1963) is an American athlete who punted for the Miami Dolphins during the 1987 season.
