= John Tagliaferri =

American football player (born 1964)

Profile
- Position: Running back

Personal information
- Born: April 13, 1964 (age 62); Orange, New Jersey, U.S.
- Listed height: 5 ft 11 in (1.80 m)
- Listed weight: 195 lb (88 kg)

Career information
- High school: West Windsor-Plainsboro South (West Windsor, New Jersey)
- College: Cornell
- NFL draft: 1986: undrafted

Career history
- Miami Dolphins (1986–1987); Parma Panthers (1987)

Awards and highlights
- Second-team All-Ivy League (1985)

Career NFL statistics
- Rushing attempts: 13
- Rushing yards: 45
- Touchdowns: 1
- Receptions: 12
- Receiving yards: 117
- Stats at Pro Football Reference

John Tagliaferri (born April 13, 1964) is an American former professional football player who was a running back for the Miami Dolphins of the National Football League (NFL). In 1987 he played professionally briefly in the Italian Football League, before signing and playing with the Miami Dolphins in the 1987 strike season. He played college football for the Cornell Big Red.

== College career ==
Tagliaferri played four seasons at Cornell University for the Big Red, playing on special teams and as a reserve running back for three years and starting at fullback as a senior. In his final season, he led Cornell in rushing with 583 yards on 155 carries and in receiving with 61 receptions for 358 yards and also led the team with eight total touchdowns and was named second-team All-Ivy League. Tagliaferri left Cornell as the schools leader for receptions in a career (99), in a season (61) and in a game (15).

== Professional career ==
Tagliaferri was signed by the Miami Dolphins as an undrafted free agent in 1986 but was cut during the preseason. He then played football professionally in Italy for the Parma Panthers. After he began working as an investment banker for Lord Abbett until he was re-signed by the Dolphins in October 1987 as a replacement player during the 1987 NFL players strike. In three games, Tagliaferri rushed 13 times for 45 yards and one touchdown and led all of the replacement Dolphins with 12 receptions and 117 receiving yards. He was released by the Dolphins on November 2, 1987, after the strike ended.
