= Steve Jacobson =

American football player (born 1962)

No. 72
- Position: Guard

Personal information
- Born: November 18, 1962 (age 63); Corpus Christi, Texas, U.S.
- Listed height: 6 ft 3 in (1.91 m)
- Listed weight: 255 lb (116 kg)

Career information
- High school: Sterling Aviation (Houston, Texas)
- College: Abilene Christian
- NFL draft: 1986: undrafted

Career history
- Chicago Bears (1986)*; Miami Dolphins (1987)
- * Offseason or practice squad member only

Career NFL statistics
- Games played: 3
- Stats at Pro Football Reference

Stephen Dean Jacobson (born November 18, 1962) is an American former professional football player who was a guard for the Miami Dolphins of the National Football League (NFL) in 1987. He played college football for the Abilene Christian Wildcats.
