= Scott Stankavage =

American football player (born 1962)

No. 14
- Position: Quarterback

Personal information
- Born: July 5, 1962 (age 64); Philadelphia, Pennsylvania, U.S.
- Listed height: 6 ft 1 in (1.85 m)
- Listed weight: 194 lb (88 kg)

Career information
- High school: Central Bucks High School East
- College: North Carolina
- NFL draft: 1984: undrafted

Career history
- Denver Broncos (1984–1986); Philadelphia Eagles (1987)*; Miami Dolphins (1987)
- * Offseason or practice squad member only

Career NFL statistics
- Passing yards: 66
- TD–INT: 0-2
- Passer rating: 7.9
- Stats at Pro Football Reference

Scott Stankavage (born July 5, 1962) is a retired American football quarterback. He played his high school football at Central Bucks High School East in Buckingham Township, Pennsylvania, his college football at North Carolina, and his professional career for the Denver Broncos and Miami Dolphins of the National Football League (NFL).

== Family ==
He was married to Susan Walsh, a former top-level swimmer, from 1986–1997. They have three children: Sarah Elizabeth (born July 12, 1988 in Chapel Hill, North Carolina) and Shelby (born 1991) are fitness instructors for Flywheel Sports, whereas Shawn (born 1996) played football for Vanderbilt.

In 2005, Scott married Katherine Dillon Stankavage, a yoga teacher. They have four children together; triplets born in 2009: Ella Elizabeth, Leo Dillon and Madison Quinn. Their fourth child, Jordan Grace, was born in 2011.
