= Leland Douglas =

American football player (born 1963)

No. 89
- Position: Wide receiver

Personal information
- Born: September 23, 1963 (age 63); Beaumont, Texas, U.S.
- Listed height: 6 ft 0 in (1.83 m)
- Listed weight: 179 lb (81 kg)

Career information
- High school: Hebert (Beaumont)
- College: Baylor (1984–1986)
- NFL draft: 1987: undrafted

Career history
- Miami Dolphins (1987)

Career NFL statistics
- Receptions: 9
- Receiving yards: 92
- Touchdowns: 1
- Stats at Pro Football Reference

Leland Cleveland Douglas (born September 23, 1963) is an American former professional football player who was a wide receiver for one season with the Miami Dolphins of the National Football League (NFL). He played college football for the Baylor Bears.

== Early life and college ==
Leland Cleveland Douglas was born on September 23, 1963, in Beaumont, Texas. He attended Hebert High School in Beaumont.

Douglas was a three-year letterman for the Baylor Bears of Baylor University from 1984 to 1986. He caught 17 passes for 258 yards and one touchdown in 1984, 17 passes for 267 yards and two touchdowns in 1985, and 19 passes for 290 yards in 1986.

== Professional career ==
Douglas signed with the Miami Dolphins on May 1, 1987, after going undrafted in the 1987 NFL draft. He was released on August 31. On September 22, Douglas re-signed with the Dolphins during the 1987 NFL players strike. He played in three games, starting two, for the Dolphins during the 1987 season, recording nine receptions for 92 yards and one touchdown. He was released on October 19, 1987, after the strike ended.
