= Tom Brown (running back) =

American football player (born 1964)

No. 36
- Position: Running back

Personal information
- Born: November 20, 1964 (age 61); Ridgway, Pennsylvania, U.S.
- Listed height: 6 ft 1 in (1.85 m)
- Listed weight: 223 lb (101 kg)

Career information
- High school: Burrell (PA)
- College: Pittsburgh
- NFL draft: 1987: 7th round, 182nd overall pick

Career history
- Miami Dolphins (1987–1989); Washington Redskins (1990)*
- * Offseason or practice squad member only

Career NFL statistics
- Rushing yards: 29
- Rushing average: 1.8
- Receptions: 14
- Receiving yards: 123
- Stats at Pro Football Reference

Thomas Martin Brown (born November 20, 1964) is an American former professional football player for the National Football League (NFL)'s Miami Dolphins. He played in 10 games total between the 1987 and 1989 seasons after his collegiate career at Pittsburgh.

Pre-draft measurables
Height	Weight	Arm length	Hand span	40-yard dash	10-yard split	20-yard split	20-yard shuttle	Vertical jump	Broad jump	Bench press
6 ft 0 1/2 in (1.84 m)	218 lb (99 kg)	29 3/4 in (0.76 m)	8 1/2 in (0.22 m)	4.69 s	1.59 s	2.74 s	4.35 s	25.5 in (0.65 m)	8 ft 1 in (2.46 m)	19 reps
All values from NFL Combine
