= Scott Nicolas =

American football player (born 1960)

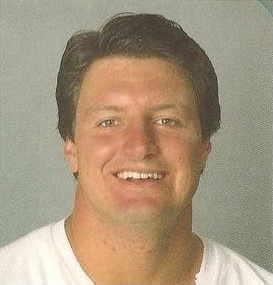

No. 58, 52
- Position: Linebacker

Personal information
- Born: August 7, 1960 (age 66); Wichita Falls, Texas, U.S.
- Listed height: 6 ft 3 in (1.91 m)
- Listed weight: 226 lb (103 kg)

Career information
- High school: Clearwater (Clearwater, Florida)
- College: Miami (FL)
- NFL draft: 1982: 12th round, 310th overall pick

Career history
- Cleveland Browns (1982–1986); Miami Dolphins (1987–1988)

Career NFL statistics
- Sacks: 1
- Fumble recoveries: 1
- Stats at Pro Football Reference

Scott Stephen Nicolas (born August 7, 1960) is an American former professional football player who was a linebacker in the National Football League (NFL).

Nicolas played high school football for the Clearwater Tornadoes in Clearwater, Florida, and college football for the Miami Hurricanes and then spent six seasons as a linebacker with the NFL's Cleveland Browns from 1982 to 1986 and the Miami Dolphins in 1987.

== Early life ==
Nicolas was a 3 sport letterman in football, baseball, and basketball. earned Clearwater high's two most prestigious athletic awards, the Earle Brown Award, and the Best All Around Senior Athlete Award. His senior yr he was first-team All-County Honors, All-District, All-Regions, All Suncoast, All-State, and honorable mention All-American.

== College career ==
Nicolas attended the University of Miami and played for the Hurricanes football team from 1978 to 1981. He became a starter his freshman year against Notre Dame. As a freshman, he set and still holds the record for the most tackles in a single game, 26, against Penn State. He went on to lead the team in tackles that season and every season after. When Nicolas left the University of Miami, he held the all-time record for total tackles, with 307 unassisted tackles and 149 assists. He set the record for the most solo tackles and most tackles in a single season. Nicolas was inducted into the University of Miami Sports Hall of Fame at the 51st Annual Induction Banquet in 2019

== Professional career ==
Nicolas was selected in the 12th round with the 310th overall pick by the Cleveland Browns in 1982 and played for them for five years.

Nicolas was signed by the Miami Dolphins in 1987. In the 1988 season, he tore his rotator cuff, he was placed on injured reserve for the remainder of the season. The Dolphins eventually released him in May, 1989, when he could not pass his physical due to his shoulder injury .
