= Rick Graf =

American football player (born 1964)

No. 58, 99, 93, 90
- Position: Linebacker

Personal information
- Born: August 29, 1964 (age 62); Iowa City, Iowa, U.S.
- Listed height: 6 ft 5 in (1.96 m)
- Listed weight: 244 lb (111 kg)

Career information
- High school: James Madison Memorial
- College: Wisconsin
- NFL draft: 1987: 2nd round, 43rd overall pick

Career history
- Miami Dolphins (1987–1990); Houston Oilers (1991–1992); Washington Redskins (1993–1994)

Awards and highlights
- Second-team All-Big Ten (1986)

Career NFL statistics
- Sacks: 4
- Fumble recoveries: 5
- Interceptions: 2
- Stats at Pro Football Reference

Richard Glenn Graf (born August 29, 1964) is an American former professional football player who was a linebacker for eight years in the National Football League (NFL) for the Miami Dolphins (1987–1990), the Houston Oilers (1991–1992), and the Washington Redskins (1993–1994). He played college football for the Wisconsin Badgers.

== Early life ==
Graf is the youngest of three sons of Richard and Barbara Graf. He was raised in Madison, Wisconsin. While attending Madison public schools, he was active in swimming, track and field, hockey, and football. Graf graduated in 1982 from James Madison Memorial High School.

During high school, Graf was an all-state linebacker in football. He also played on the third line for the Madison Memorial hockey team. He also competed in track and field as a sprinter and 110-meter high hurdler.

== College career ==
Graf was recruited to the University of Wisconsin–Madison by football coach Dave McClain. After being redshirted as a freshman, he was a four-year starter at linebacker from 1983 to 1986. In addition to football, as a freshman Graf was a left-winger on the Badgers' junior varsity hockey team.

On the football field, Graf and his Badgers teammate Tim Jordan were known as "Thunder and Lightning." During the 1985 season, Graf tore his ACL in a game against Northwestern University. This injury ended his season. Graf returned and played in his senior year. Despite Wisconsin's 3–9 team record, he was named All-Big Ten linebacker by the coaches and media.

During his collegiate years, Graf participated in two college plays: the Sound of Music and Antigone. Graf completed his undergraduate degree in communications (B.S. 1987).

== Professional career ==
Pre-draft measurables
Height	Weight	Arm length	Hand span	40-yard dash	10-yard split	20-yard split	20-yard shuttle	Vertical jump	Broad jump	Bench press
6 ft 5 in (1.96 m)	240 lb (109 kg)	32 in (0.81 m)	9 1/2 in (0.24 m)	4.66 s	1.57 s	2.69 s	4.02 s	34.0 in (0.86 m)	10 ft 2 in (3.10 m)	18 reps
All values from NFL Combine

Graf was selected in the second round (43rd pick) of the 1987 NFL draft by the Miami Dolphins. Playing under coach Don Shula, Graf became a starter during his rookie year. Graf played for the Miami Dolphins (1986–90), the Houston Oilers (1991–92), and the Washington Redskins (1993–94). He was forced to retire after a severe neck injury suffered in the last pre-season game with the Redskins.

Graf is an active member of the Minnesota Chapter of the National Football League Alumni organization.

- In 1988, Graf was named Favorite Son of Madison by the Pen and Mike Club.
- In 2003, Graf was made a member of the Madison Sports Hall of Fame.

Graf resides in Edina, Minnesota, and his wife and their three children.
