= John Offerdahl =

American football player and restaurateur (born 1964)

No. 56
- Position: Linebacker

Personal information
- Born: August 17, 1964 (age 62); Wisconsin Rapids, Wisconsin, U.S.
- Listed height: 6 ft 3 in (1.91 m)
- Listed weight: 240 lb (109 kg)

Career information
- High school: Fort Atkinson (WI)
- College: Western Michigan
- NFL draft: 1986: 2nd round, 52nd overall pick

Career history
- Miami Dolphins (1986–1993)

Awards and highlights
- NFL Defensive Rookie of the Year (1986); First-team All-Pro (1990); 2× Second-team All-Pro (1986, 1988); 5× Pro Bowl (1986–1990); PFWA All-Rookie Team (1986); Miami Dolphins Honor Roll; Second-team All-American (1985); Third-team All-American (1984); 3× First-team All-MAC (1983–1985); MAC Defensive Player of the Year (1985); Senior Bowl Defensive MVP (1986); Western Michigan Hall of Fame (1996); MAC Hall of Fame; Western Michigan Broncos No. 49 retired

Career NFL statistics
- Sacks: 9.5
- Interceptions: 4
- Games: 89
- Stats at Pro Football Reference

John Arnold Offerdahl (born August 17, 1964) is an American former professional football player who spent his entire eight-year career as a linebacker for the Miami Dolphins of the National Football League (NFL). He played college football for the Western Michigan Broncos, before being selected by the Dolphins with the 52nd pick of the 1986 NFL draft.

While at WMU, Offerdahl set school records in tackles and recovered fumbles, making the All Mid-American Conference first-team his last three years, the Associated Press All American third-team his junior year, and the All American second-team his senior year. In his professional career, Offerdahl was selected for the Pro Bowl in each of his first five years in the league, and was a two-time All-Pro; in 1986 as a second-team selection and in 1990 as a first-team selection.

While still playing, Offerdahl opened a chain of bagel restaurants called Offerdahl's Bagel Gourmet, before selling the franchise in 1995. In 2000, he started a second franchise, Offerdahl's Cafe Grill.

== Early life ==
John Offerdahl was born in Wisconsin Rapids, Wisconsin, on August 17, 1964, to Arnold and Irene Offerdahl. His mother was a teacher, first of art and later of furniture refinishing. He has four older sisters, Mary, Ruth, Susan, and Sarah.

After graduating from Fort Atkinson High School, Offerdahl received a partial football scholarship by Western Michigan University, the only Division I team to make him an offer. WMU noticed Offerdahl while scouting his teammate Jerry Quaerna. The scholarship became a full scholarship after Offerdahl impressed the coaching staff in early practices. Offerdahl stayed at WMU for four years – from the 1982 through 1985 seasons – and majored in biomedicine. He started every game over that time.

While at WMU, Offerdahl recorded 694 career tackles, a school record. In addition to the career record, he set the school's single-season record with 192 tackles during his sophomore year. He led the Mid-American Conference in tackles his sophomore, junior, and senior years, and was second in the conference his freshman year. He also forced 17 fumbles during his time at WMU, recovering a school record of 8.

Offerdahl was named a third-team All American by the Associated Press in 1984, and second-team All American in 1985. He made the all-conference first-team in each of his last three years, and was the conference Defensive Player of the Year in his senior year. Western Michigan University retired his jersey number in 1995 and inducted Offerdahl into its Hall of Fame a year later. He was inducted into the Mid-American Conference Hall of Fame in 2013.

== Professional career ==
Offerdahl was selected by the Miami Dolphins in the second round in the 1986 NFL draft. The Dolphins did not have a first-round pick, making Offerdahl their first selection of the draft, and the draft's 52nd overall. Originally considered a middle or late-round pick, Offerdahl's draft stock skyrocketed during the Senior Bowl, which saw him put on an impressive performance against Heisman Trophy-winning running back Bo Jackson. His Senior Bowl highlights included two stops at the goal line during the same drive, one of which was an acrobatic move that stopped Jackson in mid-air. Offerdahl was taken to reinforce a struggling Dolphins defense, which held the 23rd-overall rank in the previous season.

In his rookie year, Offerdahl was the Dolphins' starting right inside linebacker. As with his rookie year in college, he impressed the coaching staff early in the preseason; he was named the starter 10 days after joining training camp, and had twice as many tackles as any of his teammates after the first three preseason games. Although the Dolphins had an 8–8 season, Offerdahl impressed individually. He was selected for the Pro Bowl and was named a second-team All-Pro by the Associated Press after recording 130 tackles, two sacks, and an interception in 15 games. He also shared the Pro Football Weekly/Pro Football Writers Association's Defensive Rookie of the Year Award with the San Diego Chargers' Leslie O'Neal.

In his second season, which was shortened by a players' strike, Offerdahl was limited to nine starts due to injury. Despite the reduction in playing time, he recorded 1 1/2 sacks and was invited back to the Pro Bowl. His third season was the first in which he played in all 16 games. He had two interceptions – the most in a season during his professional career – as well as his career's only fumble recovery and a half-sack, on the way to his third consecutive Pro Bowl appearance.

Offerdahl spent the first 81 days of the 1989 season, his fourth in the league, in a contract holdout. Veteran player Barry Krauss was brought into the Dolphins at the beginning of the season to play the right inside linebacker position while Offerdahl held out. Instead of displacing Krauss, Offerdahl was moved to the left inside linebacker position upon his return. Offerdahl played 10 games and started 8, recording 1 1/2 sacks, and was invited to the Pro Bowl for a fourth time.

The 1990 season is considered one of Offerdahl's best. Continuing at left inside linebacker, Offerdahl started all sixteen regular-season games, leading the team in tackles and contributing a sack and an interception for a 28-yard return, the longest in his career. He was invited to a fifth consecutive Pro Bowl and was named a first-team All-Pro.

Injuries plagued Offerdahl's last three years in the league, including bicep, shoulder, and hamstring injuries in his final season. Between 1991 and 1993, he played in 6, 8, and 9 regular-season games respectively, although in all but one of those games he was a starter. Returning to the right inside linebacker position, he recorded 1 1/2 sacks in each of the 1991 and 1992 seasons, and none in 1993. Including the Dolphins' two games in the 1992 playoffs, Offerdahl played in 24 out of a possible 50 games, during which time they went 14–3 when he was fully fit, and 15–18 when he was playing through injury or inactive. He retired after the 1993 season, walking away from a contract worth up to $2.5 million for the year after struggling in a 1994 preseason game at only 31 years of age.

In October 2013, Offerdahl was added to the Dolphins' Ring of Honor, an honor roll permanently displayed inside of the team's stadium. He joined the 1972 undefeated team and 24 other players as a member of the Ring.

== Business ventures ==
In 1990, while still playing for the Dolphins, Offerdahl opened a bagel store, Offerdahl's Bagel Gourmet, in Weston, Florida. It would become the first of 10 locations. In 1995, Offerdahl merged with three other bagel retailers to form Einstein Bros. Bagels, a national chain. He stayed with the company for just over a year as the Vice President of Operations for Florida, and was a member of the board until 1997. In the aftermath of Hurricane Andrew in 1992, Offerdahl's Bagel Gourmet, then with three locations, produced 6,000 bagels to distribute to people that lost their homes in the storm.

In 2000, he again entered the restaurant business, opening Offerdahl's Café Grill, a chain of casual restaurants. According to Katie Sharp and Louis Bien of SB Nation, Offerdahl – while not alone as an athlete-turned restaurateur – is one of only a few to focus on healthy food. As of December 2015, there are six Offerdahl's Café Grill locations; four in Broward County and one in each of Miami-Dade and Palm Beach counties. Offerdahl's bagels eventually was sold and merged with Einstein Bros. Bagels. Offerdahl's Café Grill is now called Offerdahl's Off the Grill.

== Personal ==
Offerdahl lives in Fort Lauderdale, Florida, with his wife, Lynn. The couple have three children, Alexandra, Drew, and Jameson.

In his final season with the Dolphins, Offerdahl received the Ed Block Courage Award, an NFL-wide award for humanitarian work. He also received the Nat Moore Community Service Award, a Miami Dolphins-specific award for community engagement, in 1989, 1990, and 1993. He is the chairperson of the National Christian Foundation of South Florida. He holds an annual charity event in Pompano Beach, Florida, called the Gridiron Grill-off Food, Wine, & Tailgate Festival.

In 1993, while recovering from a bicep injury during the preseason, Offerdahl and four others rescued an elderly couple whose car was knocked into a pond after being hit by another car. After rescuing the passenger, Offerdahl dived into the pond repeatedly in an effort to free the driver, and was ultimately successful in doing so.

In 2009, Offerdahl and his son approached two men acting suspiciously outside of the house of neighbor Bernice Novack; the men fled and Offerdahl and his son were unable to catch them. Novack was later murdered; it is believed that one of those two men was the killer and that Offerdahl's intervention foiled a first attempt at Novack's life.
