= Brian Sochia =

American football player (born 1961)

No. 72, 70
- Positions: Nose tackle, defensive end

Personal information
- Born: July 21, 1961 (age 65); Massena, New York, U.S.
- Listed height: 6 ft 3 in (1.91 m)
- Listed weight: 252 lb (114 kg)

Career information
- High school: St. Lawrence Central (Massena, New York)
- College: Northwestern Oklahoma State
- NFL draft: 1983: undrafted

Career history
- Houston Oilers (1983–1985); Miami Dolphins (1986–1991); Denver Broncos (1991-1992)

Awards and highlights
- Pro Bowl (1988)

Career NFL statistics
- Sacks: 25.5
- Fumble recoveries: 4
- Touchdowns: 1
- Stats at Pro Football Reference

Brian John Sochia (born July 21, 1961) is an American former professional football player who was a nose tackle in the National Football League (NFL).

Sochia played high school football at St. Lawrence Central High School in Brasher Falls, New York and college football at Northwestern Oklahoma State University from 1979 to 1982, earning first-team all-conference honors during his junior and senior seasons. In 1982, he was selected as an honorable mention National Association of Intercollegiate Athletics (NAIA) All-American.

Sochia entered the NFL as a free-agent in Houston in 1983 and played three seasons with the Houston Oilers. Released by Houston in November 1986, he signed with the Miami Dolphins in 1986 as back-up nose tackle when Bob Baumhower was injured. He started all 12 non-strike games in 1987. He became a starter in 1987 and had 3.5 sacks and 37 tackles. In 1988, he started all 16 games and was second on the team with 4.5 sacks, in addition to collecting 72 tackles and recovering a pair of fumbles. He made the Pro Bowl as replacement for Cincinnati’s Tim Krumrie in 1988. In 1989, Sochia ranked third on the Dolphins with a career-high five sacks, and finished fourth in tackles with career-high 71. He went into the 1989 season with career totals of 234 tackles and 16.5 sacks.

During the 1991 season, he was acquired by the Denver Broncos. He finished his career in Denver in 1992. He played in 112 NFL games and ended with 243 tackles and 23.5 sacks.
