= David Frye (American football) =

American football player (1961–2021)

No. 58, 53
- Position: Linebacker

Personal information
- Born: June 21, 1961 (age 65); Cincinnati, Ohio, U.S.
- Died: November 15, 2021 (aged 60)
- Listed height: 6 ft 2 in (1.88 m)
- Listed weight: 223 lb (101 kg)

Career information
- High school: Woodward (Cincinnati, Ohio)
- College: Purdue
- NFL draft: 1983: undrafted

Career history
- Atlanta Falcons (1983–1985); Miami Dolphins (1986–1989)

Awards and highlights
- Second-team All-Big Ten (1982)

Career NFL statistics
- Sacks: 9
- Interceptions: 1
- Fumble recoveries: 6
- Stats at Pro Football Reference

David William Frye (June 21, 1961 - November 15, 2021) was an American former professional football player who was a linebacker in the National Football League (NFL) for seven seasons. During his NFL career, he played for the Atlanta Falcons and Miami Dolphins. Frye played collegiately at Purdue University.
