= Fred Banks (American football) =

American football player (born 1962)

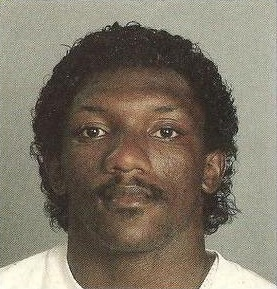
- Banks in 1985

No. 83, 86, 81
- Position: Wide receiver

Personal information
- Born: May 26, 1962 (age 64); Columbus, Georgia, U.S.
- Listed height: 5 ft 10 in (1.78 m)
- Listed weight: 177 lb (80 kg)

Career information
- High school: Baker (Columbus)
- College: Liberty
- NFL draft: 1985: 8th round, 203rd overall pick

Career history
- Cleveland Browns (1985–1986); Miami Dolphins (1987–1993); Chicago Bears (1993); Sacramento Gold Miners (1994)

Career NFL statistics
- Receptions: 105
- Receiving yards: 1,636
- Touchdowns: 10
- Stats at Pro Football Reference

Frederick Ray Banks (born May 26, 1962) is an American former professional football player who was a wide receiver in the National Football League (NFL). He played eight seasons for the Cleveland Browns (1985), Miami Dolphins (1987–1993), and Chicago Bears (1993). He was selected by the Browns in the eighth round of the 1985 NFL draft. He played college football for the Liberty Flames.
