= Larry Kolic =

American football player (born 1963)

No. 94, 54
- Position: Linebacker

Personal information
- Born: August 31, 1963 (age 63); Cleveland, Ohio, U.S.
- Listed height: 6 ft 1 in (1.85 m)
- Listed weight: 242 lb (110 kg)

Career information
- High school: Smithville (OH)
- College: Ohio State
- NFL draft: 1986: 7th round, 193rd overall pick

Career history
- Miami Dolphins (1986–1988); Indianapolis Colts (1990)*
- * Offseason or practice squad member only

Career NFL statistics
- Fumble recoveries: 1
- Stats at Pro Football Reference

Larry Kolic (born August 31, 1963) is an American former professional football player who was a linebacker for the Miami Dolphins of the National Football League (NFL) from 1986 to 1988. He played college football for the Ohio State Buckeyes and was selected by the Dolphins in the seventh round of the 1986 NFL draft with the 193rd overall pick.
