= Tom Toth =

American football player (born 1962)

No. 76, 73
- Positions: Guard, tackle

Personal information
- Born: May 23, 1962 (age 64); Blue Island, Illinois, U.S.
- Listed height: 6 ft 5 in (1.96 m)
- Listed weight: 279 lb (127 kg)

Career information
- High school: Carl Sandburg (Orland Park, Illinois)
- College: Western Michigan (1981–1984)
- NFL draft: 1985: 4th round, 102nd overall pick

Career history
- New England Patriots (1985); Miami Dolphins (1986–1989); San Diego Chargers (1990); Miami Dolphins (1991)

Career NFL statistics
- Games played: 51
- Games started: 18
- Stats at Pro Football Reference

Thomas Jeffrey Toth (born May 23, 1962) is an American former professional football player who was an offensive lineman for five seasons in the National Football League (NFL) with the Miami Dolphins and San Diego Chargers. He was selected by the New England Patriots in the fourth round of the 1985 NFL draft after playing college football for the Western Michigan Broncos.

== Early life and college ==
Thomas Jeffrey Toth was born on May 23, 1962, in Blue Island, Illinois. He attended Carl Sandburg High School in Orland Park, Illinois.

Toth played college football for the Broncos of Western Michigan University. He redshirted the 1981 season and was a three-year letterman from 1982 to 1984.

== Professional career ==
Toth was selected by the New England Patriots in the fourth round, with the 102nd overall pick, of the 1985 NFL draft. He officially signed with the team on July 19. He was placed on injured reserve on August 15, 1985, and missed the entire 1985 season. Toth was released by the Patriots on September 1, 1986.

Toth signed with the Miami Dolphins on September 9, 1986. He played in 13 games for the Dolphins during the 1986 season. He appeared in 12 games, all starts, for the Dolphins in the strike-shortened 1987 season as the team finished 8–7. Toth was placed on injured reserve on September 28, 1988, and later activated on November 19, 1988. Overall, he played in nine games, starting four, during the 1988 season. He appeared in all 16 games, starting two, in 1989, and became a free agent after the season.

Toth was signed by the San Diego Chargers on March 28, 1990. He played in the first game of the 1990 season before being released on September 10, 1990.

Toth signed with the Dolphins again on August 6, 1991. He was waived/injured on August 20 and then reverted to injured reserve. He was waived from injured reserve on November 7, 1991.
