= Scott Schwedes =

American football player (born 1965)

No. 81, 85
- Position: Wide receiver

Personal information
- Born: June 30, 1965 (age 61); Syracuse, New York, U.S.
- Listed height: 6 ft 0 in (1.83 m)
- Listed weight: 182 lb (83 kg)

Career information
- High school: Jamesville-DeWitt (DeWitt, New York)
- College: Syracuse (1983–1986)
- NFL draft: 1987: 2nd round, 56th overall pick

Career history
- Miami Dolphins (1987–1990); San Diego Chargers (1990); Miami Dolphins (1990)

Awards and highlights
- 2× First-team All-East (1985, 1986)

Career NFL statistics
- Receptions: 19
- Receiving yards: 370
- Receiving touchdowns: 2
- Stats at Pro Football Reference

Scott Andrew Schwedes (born June 30, 1965) is an American former professional football player who was a wide receiver for four seasons in the National Football League (NFL) with the Miami Dolphins and San Diego Chargers. He was selected by the Dolphins in the second round of the 1987 NFL draft with the 56th overall pick after playing college football at Syracuse University.

== Early life ==
Scott Andrew Schwedes was born on June 30, 1965, in Syracuse, New York. He played high school football and lacrosse at Jamesville-DeWitt High School in DeWitt, New York. He graduated from Jamesville-DeWitt in 1983 and was an inaugural member of their hall of fame in 2000. Schwedes was inducted into the Greater Syracuse Sports Hall of Fame in 2022.

== College career ==
Schwedes was a four-year letterman for the Syracuse Orange of Syracuse University from 1983 to 1986. He recorded career totals of 139 receptions for 2,111 yards and 16 touchdowns, 82 punt returns for 876 yards and three touchdowns, 12 kick returns for 247 yards, and 22 rushing attempts for 117 yards. His two punt return touchdowns in 1985 were tied for the most in the country with Erroll Tucker. Schwedes earned Associated Press first-team All-East honors in both 1985 and 1986. His 249 receiving yards on November 16, 1985, was the most in school history until being broken by Amba Etta-Tawo in 2016.

== Professional career ==
Schwedes was selected by the Miami Dolphins in the second round, with the 56th overall pick, of the 1987 NFL draft. He officially signed with the Dolphins on August 4. He played in 12 games during the strike-shortened 1987 season, returning 24 punts for 203 yards and nine kicks for 177 yards while also fumbling seven times and recovering three fumbles. Schwedes appeared in all 16 games, starting one, for the Dolphins in 1988, totaling six receptions for 130 yards, 24 punt returns for 230 yards, and three kick returns for 49 yards. He was placed on injured reserve on September 7, 1989, and was activated on October 27, 1989. He played in nine games during the 1987 season, recording seven catches for 174 yards and one touchdown, 18 punt returns for 210 yards and one touchdown, three kick returns for 24 yards, three fumbles, and two recoveries. Schwedes was released by the Dolphins on September 14, 1990.

Schwedes signed with the San Diego Chargers on September 21, 1990. He played in five games for the Chargers in 1990, returning five punts for 33 yards, before being released on October 27, 1990.

Schwedes was re-signed by the Dolphins on November 13, 1990. He appeared in four games for the Dolphins during the 1990 season, catching six passes for 66 yards and one touchdown while also returning nine punts for 89 yards and two kicks for 52 yards. He retired on May 3, 1991.

== Personal life ==
His father Gerhard Schwedes also played football at Syracuse and later the American Football League (AFL).
