= T. J. Turner (defensive lineman) =

American football player (1963–2009)

No. 95
- Position: Defensive end

Personal information
- Born: May 16, 1963; Lufkin, Texas, U.S.
- Died: August 24, 2009 (aged 46); Bryan, Texas, U.S.
- Listed height: 6 ft 4 in (1.93 m)
- Listed weight: 256 lb (116 kg)

Career information
- High school: Lufkin
- College: Houston
- NFL draft: 1986: 3rd round, 81st overall pick

Career history
- Miami Dolphins (1986–1992)

Awards and highlights
- First-team All-SWC (1984)

Career NFL statistics
- Games played: 101
- Games started: 83
- Sacks: 16
- Stats at Pro Football Reference

Tommy James Turner (May 16, 1963 – August 24, 2009) was an American professional football defensive end in the National Football League (NFL) for the Miami Dolphins. He was selected by the Dolphins in the third round of the 1986 NFL draft with the 81st overall pick. He played college football for the University of Houston. A 1981 Parade All-American, he was considered to be the top defensive end prospect in the nation coming out of high school. At Houston, he had 30 sacks, and compiled 19 sacks and 180 tackles in his last two seasons. His 52 tackles in 1982 were the most by a freshman in Houston history. As a Dolphin, he was given the nickname "Wrong-Way T.J." after taking a wrong turn onto the Florida Turnpike, blaming the mistake on the confusing Golden Glades Interchange. He drove 50 miles before attempting to turn around, at which point he flipped his truck and was cited for careless driving. He died on August 24, 2009, aged 46.
