= Mike Lambrecht =

American football player (born 1963)

No. 69
- Position: Defensive tackle

Personal information
- Born: May 2, 1963 (age 63); Watertown, Minnesota, U.S.
- Listed height: 6 ft 1 in (1.85 m)
- Listed weight: 271 lb (123 kg)

Career information
- High school: Watertown (MN)
- College: St. Cloud State
- NFL draft: 1986: undrafted

Career history
- Miami Dolphins (1987–1988); New York Giants (1989)*; Miami Dolphins (1989); Ottawa Rough Riders (1990)
- * Offseason or practice squad member only
- Stats at Pro Football Reference

Mike Lambrecht (born May 2, 1963) is an American former professional football defensive tackle. He played for the Miami Dolphins from 1987 to 1989 and for the Ottawa Rough Riders in 1990.
