= 1990 Miami Dolphins season =

25th season in franchise history; first playoff berth in 5 years

- General manager: Eddie Jones
- Head coach: Don Shula
- Offensive coordinator: Gary Stevens
- Defensive coordinator: Tom Olivadotti
- Home stadium: Joe Robbie Stadium

Results
- Record: 12–4
- Division place: 2nd AFC East
- Playoffs: Won Wild Card Playoffs (vs. Chiefs) 17–16; Lost Divisional Playoffs (at Bills) 34–44
- Pro Bowlers: 3: TE Ferrell Edmunds; LT Richmond Webb; DE Jeff Cross

The 1990 Miami Dolphins season was the team's twenty-first season in the National Football League and twenty-fifth overall. After four seasons out of the playoffs with a combined record of 30 wins and 33 losses, the Dolphins returned to postseason play for the first time since 1985 with twelve wins and four losses. They defeated the Kansas City Chiefs 17–16 in the Wild Card Game, before being knocked out of contention by the Buffalo Bills, 44–34 in the Divisional Playoff Game.

1990 marked the first time since their record 1972 perfect season that the Dolphins played the New York Giants, and merely the second in team history. The reason for this is that before the admission of the Texans in 2002, NFL scheduling formulas for games outside a team's division were much more influenced by table position during the previous season. Also, the scheduled game between the Giants and Dolphins in 1987 was cancelled due to a players' strike.

As of 2025, this was also the last time the Dolphins finished with at least twelve wins in the regular season.

== Offseason ==
=== NFL draft ===
1990 Miami Dolphins draft
Round	Pick	Player	Position	College	Notes
1	9	Richmond Webb *	Offensive tackle	Texas A&M	
2	40	Keith Sims *	Offensive guard	Iowa State	
3	67	Alfred Oglesby	Nose Tackle	Houston	
4	93	Scott Mitchell	Quarterback	Utah	
5	137	Leroy Holt	Fullback	USC	
6	151	Sean Vanhorse	Cornerback	Howard	
8	205	Thomas Woods	Wide receiver	Tennessee	
9	232	Phil Ross	Tight end	Oregon State	
12	315	Bobby Harden	Safety	Miami (FL)	
Made roster * Made at least one Pro Bowl during career

=== Undrafted free agents ===
1990 undrafted free agents of note
Player	Position	College
Randy Cockrell	Linebacker	Virginia Tech
Darryl Davis	Linebacker	Florida A&M
Chris Haering	Linebacker	West Virginia
Andre Johnson	Wide receiver	Ferris State
Clarence Jones	Running back	Army
John Jurkovic	Nose Tackle	Eastern Illinois
Dave Pacitti	Tackle	Villanova
Sean Redman	Running back	Penn State
Mike Rosson	Defensive end	Tulsa
Craig Schneider	Guard	Illinois
Dee Smith	Running back	Louisville
Pee Wee Smith	Wide receiver	Miami (FL)
Paul Soltis	Linebacker	Youngstown State

== Personnel ==
=== Staff ===
1990 Miami Dolphins staff
Front office: President – Tim Robbie; Executive vice president/general manager – Eddie Jones; Vice president – Don Shula; Assistant general manager – Bryan Wiedmeier; Director of player personnel – Charley Winner; Director of pro personnel – Monte Clark; Director of college scouting – Tom Heckert, Sr.; Head coaches: Head coach – Don Shula; Assistant head coach – John Sandusky; Offensive coaches: Quarterbacks/pass offense – Gary Stevens; Offensive backs – Carl Taseff; Receivers – Larry Seiple; Offensive line – John Sandusky; Coaches' assistant – Tony Nathan	Defensive coaches: Defense – Tom Olivadotti; Defensive line – Dan Sekanovich; Linebackers – George Hill; Defensive backs – Mel Phillips; Special teams coaches: Special teams – Mike Westhoff; Strength and conditioning: Strength and conditioning – Junior Wade

=== Roster ===
1990 Miami Dolphins roster
Quarterbacks (QB): 13 Dan Marino; 19 Scott Mitchell; 9 Scott Secules; Running backs (RB): 34 Tony Collins; 32 Garrett Limbrick; 20 Marc Logan KR; 49 Tony Paige FB; 33 Sammie Smith; Wide receivers (WR): 83 Mark Clayton; 85 Mark Duper; 11 Jim Jensen; 89 Tony Martin PR; 81 James Pruitt; Tight ends (TE): 84 Greg Baty LS; 80 Ferrell Edmunds	Offensive linemen (OL): 65 Jeff Dellenbach; 74 Mark Dennis T; 61 Roy Foster G; 62 Harry Galbreath G; 69 Keith Sims G; 63 Jeff Uhlenhake; 78 Richmond Webb T; 60 Bert Weidner C/G; Defensive linemen (DL): 91 Jeff Cross DE; 90 Eric Kumerow DE; 98 Shawn Lee NT; 96 Alfred Oglesby NT; 70 Brian Sochia DE; 95 T. J. Turner DE; 77 Karl Wilson DE	Linebackers (LB): 55 Hugh Green OLB; 92 David Griggs OLB; 54 E. J. Junior OLB; 93 Cliff Odom ILB; 56 John Offerdahl ILB; 52 Mike Reichenbach ILB; Defensive backs (DB): 47 Stefon Adams CB/S; 37 J. B. Brown CB; 35 Kerry Glenn CB; 44 Paul Lankford CB; 22 Tim McKyer CB; 27 Stevon Moore FS; 25 Louis Oliver FS; 24 Rodney Thomas CB; 26 Jarvis Williams SS; Special teams (ST): 4 Reggie Roby P; 10 Pete Stoyanovich K	Practice squad: 66 John Jurkovic DT; Reserve: 86 Fred Banks WR (IR); 97 John Bosa DE (IR); 82 Andre Brown WR (IR); 99 Rick Graf LB (IR); 41 African Grant S (IR); 45 Bobby Harden S (IR); 21 Mark Higgs (IR); 29 Liffort Hobley S (IR); 38 Leroy Holt FB (IR); 88 Brian Kinchen (IR); 58 Barry Krauss LB (IR); 28 Mike McGruder CB (IR); 81 Scott Schwedes (IR); 23 Troy Stradford RB (IR); 43 George Swarn RB (IR); 48 Sean Vanhorse CB (IR); Rookies in italics 47 active, 16 reserve, 1 practice squad

== Regular season ==
=== Schedule ===
Week	Date	Opponent	Result	Record	Venue	Attendance
1	September 9	at **New England Patriots**	**W** 27–24	1–0	Foxboro Stadium	45,305
2	September 16	**Buffalo Bills**	**W** 30–7	2–0	Joe Robbie Stadium	68,142
3	September 23	at New York Giants	**L** 3–20	2–1	Giants Stadium	76,483
4	September 30	at Pittsburgh Steelers	**W** 28–6	3–1	Three Rivers Stadium	54,691
5	October 7	**New York Jets**	**W** 20–16	4–1	Joe Robbie Stadium	69,678
6	Bye					
7	October 18	**New England Patriots**	**W** 17–10	5–1	Joe Robbie Stadium	62,630
8	October 28	at **Indianapolis Colts**	**W** 27–7	6–1	Hoosier Dome	59,213
9	November 4	Phoenix Cardinals	**W** 23–3	7–1	Joe Robbie Stadium	54,294
10	November 11	at **New York Jets**	**W** 17–3	8–1	Giants Stadium	68,362
11	November 19	Los Angeles Raiders	**L** 10–13	8–2	Joe Robbie Stadium	70,553
12	November 25	at Cleveland Browns	**W** 30–13	9–2	Cleveland Municipal Stadium	70,225
13	December 2	at Washington Redskins	**L** 20–42	9–3	RFK Stadium	53,599
14	December 9	Philadelphia Eagles	**W** 23–20 (OT)	10–3	Joe Robbie Stadium	67,034
15	December 16	Seattle Seahawks	**W** 24–17	11–3	Joe Robbie Stadium	57,851
16	December 23	at **Buffalo Bills**	**L** 14–24	11–4	Rich Stadium	80,235
17	December 30	**Indianapolis Colts**	**W** 23–17	12–4	Joe Robbie Stadium	59,547
Note: Intra-division opponents are in **bold** text.

=== Standings ===
AFC East
	W	L	T	PCT	DIV	CONF	PF	PA	STK
^{(1)} Buffalo Bills	13	3	0	.813	7–1	10–2	428	263	L1
^{(4)} Miami Dolphins	12	4	0	.750	7–1	10–2	336	242	W1
Indianapolis Colts	7	9	0	.438	3–5	5–7	281	353	L1
New York Jets	6	10	0	.375	2–6	4–10	295	345	W2
New England Patriots	1	15	0	.063	1–7	1–11	181	446	L14

== Player stats ==
=== Passing ===
Player	Att	Comp	Yds	Touchdowns	INT	Rating
Dan Marino	531	306	3563	21	11	82.6

=== Receiving ===
Player	Receptions	Yards	Average	Long	Touchdowns
Mark Clayton	32	406	12.7	43	3

=== Defense ===
Player	Tackles	Sacks	Fumble Recoveries
Jeff Cross	60	11.5	2

== Playoffs ==
=== AFC wild card game ===
Miami Dolphins 17, Kansas City Chiefs 16

Quarter	1	2	3	4	Total
Chiefs	3	7	6	0	16
Dolphins	0	3	0	14	17

at Joe Robbie Stadium, Miami, Florida

- Game time: 4:00 p.m. EST
- Game weather: 75 °F (24 °C), cloudy
- Game attendance: 67,276
- Referee: Pat Haggerty
- TV announcers (ABC): Al Michaels, Frank Gifford, and Dan Dierdorf

With 2:28 left in the game, the Dolphins capped an 85-yard drive with quarterback Dan Marino's winning 12-yard touchdown pass to wide receiver Mark Clayton.

=== AFC Divisional Playoff ===
Buffalo Bills 44, Miami Dolphins 34

Quarter	1	2	3	4	Total
Dolphins	3	14	3	14	34
Bills	13	14	3	14	44

at Rich Stadium, Orchard Park, New York

- Game time: 12:30 p.m. EST
- Game weather: 31 °F (−1 °C), rain and snow
- Game attendance: 77,087
- Referee: Bob McElwee
- TV announcers (NBC): Marv Albert and Paul Maguire

== Awards and honors ==
- Jeff Cross, AFC Pro Bowl selection

=== Milestones ===
- Dan Marino, 7th Consecutive 3,000 Yard Passing Season
