= 1993 Miami Dolphins season =

28th season in franchise history

- General manager: Eddie Jones
- Head coach: Don Shula
- Home stadium: Joe Robbie Stadium

Results
- Record: 9–7
- Division place: 2nd AFC East
- Playoffs: Did not qualify
- Pro Bowlers: 4 FB Keith Byars; WR Irving Fryar; T Richmond Webb; G Keith Sims

The 1993 Miami Dolphins season was the franchise's 24th season in the National Football League.

The season was marked by Don Shula passing George Halas's record for most wins, against the Philadelphia Eagles. Also, during the Week 6 game against Cleveland, quarterback Dan Marino ruptured his Achilles' tendon and was lost for the remainder of the season. Quarterback Scott Mitchell filled in for Marino and was Player of the Month for October 1993. Mitchell, too, became injured, leaving the then 9–2 team in the hands of Doug Pederson and NFL veteran Steve DeBerg.

Rookie running back Terry Kirby led the team with 75 pass receptions, and free-agent acquisition Irving Fryar caught 64 passes for 1,010 yards.

The Dolphins had a record of 9–2 on Thanksgiving Day, but lost their final five games of the season, missing the playoffs altogether. As of the 2026 NFL season, the 1993 Miami Dolphins are the only team to start 9–2 and not reach the playoffs.

== Offseason ==
=== 1993 NFL draft ===
1993 Miami Dolphins draft
Round	Selection	Player	Position	College	Notes
1	25	O.J. McDuffie	WR	Penn State	
3	78	Terry Kirby	RB	Virginia	
4	105	Ronnie Bradford	DB	Colorado	
5	132	Chris Gray	G	Auburn	
6	164	Robert O'Neal	DB	Clemson	
7	191	David Merritt	LB	North Carolina State	
8	218	Dwayne Gordon	LB	New Hampshire	

== Personnel ==
=== Staff / Coaches ===
1993 Miami Dolphins staff
Front office: President – Tim Robbie; Executive vice president/general manager – Eddie Jones; Assistant general manager – Bryan Wiedmeier; Director of player personnel – Tom Heckert, Sr.; Director of college scouting – Tom Braatz; Staff assistant – Carl Taseff; Head coaches: Head coach – Don Shula; Assistant head coach/offensive line – John Sandusky; Offensive coaches: Offense/quarterbacks – Gary Stevens; Offensive backs – Tony Nathan; Wide receivers – Larry Seiple; Assistant offensive line/tight ends – Rich McGeorge	Defensive coaches: Defense – Tom Olivadotti; Defensive line – Joe Greene; Linebackers – George Hill; Defensive backs – Mel Phillips; Special teams coaches: Special teams – Mike Westhoff; Strength and conditioning: Strength and conditioning – Junior Wade

=== Final roster ===
1993 Miami Dolphins roster
Quarterbacks (QB): 17 Steve DeBerg; 11 Hugh Millen; 19 Scott Mitchell; Running backs (RB): 41 Keith Byars FB; 21 Mark Higgs; 43 Terry Kirby; 30 Bernie Parmalee; 22 James Saxon; Wide receivers (WR): 80 Irving Fryar; 82 Mark Ingram; 89 Tony Martin; 81 O. J. McDuffie; 83 Scott Miller; Tight ends (TE): 84 Greg Baty LS; 88 Keith Jackson; 85 Ronnie Williams	Offensive linemen (OL): 66 Eddie Blake G; 65 Jeff Dellenbach C; 74 Mark Dennis T; 62 Chris Gray G; 73 Ron Heller T; 67 Jeff Novak G; 69 Keith Sims G; 57 Tom Thayer C; 78 Richmond Webb T; 60 Bert Weidner G; Defensive linemen (DL): 91 Jeff Cross DE; 90 Marco Coleman DE; 96 Mike Golic DT; 97 Jeff Hunter DE; 99 Chuck Klingbeil DT; 94 Craig Veasey DT; 79 Larry Webster DT	Linebackers (LB): 51 Bryan Cox; 92 David Griggs OLB; 59 John Grimsley OLB; 50 Dwight Hollier; 93 Cliff Odom MLB; 56 John Offerdahl MLB; 55 Chris Singleton OLB; Defensive backs (DB): 32 Bruce Alexander CB; 36 Stephen Braggs FS; 37 J. B. Brown CB; 42 Chris Green CB/S; 45 Bobby Harden SS; 24 Vestee Jackson; 47 Darrell Malone CB; 25 Louis Oliver FS; 20 Muhammad Oliver CB; 28 Frankie Smith CB; 26 Jarvis Williams SS; Special teams (ST): 7 Dale Hatcher P; 10 Pete Stoyanovich K	Practice squad: 2 Reggie Brown WR; 54 Chuck Bullough LB; 46 Rob Coons TE; 27 Mike Middleton CB; 77 Tony Rowell C; Reserve: -- Kevin Brothen G (IR); 32 Aaron Craver RB (IR); 29 Liffort Hobley S (IR); 13 Dan Marino QB (IR); 63 Jeff Uhlenhake C (IR); 23 Troy Vincent CB (IR); 87 Mike Williams WR (IR); Rookies in italics 53 active, 7 reserve, 5 practice squad

== Regular season ==
On November 14, Don Shula became the winningest head coach in NFL history by winning his 325th game. The Dolphins beat the Philadelphia Eagles.

=== Schedule ===
Week	Date	Opponent	Result	Record	Venue	Recap
1	September 5	at **Indianapolis Colts**	**W** 24–20	1–0	Hoosier Dome	Recap
2	September 12	**New York Jets**	**L** 14–24	1–1	Joe Robbie Stadium	Recap
3	Bye					
4	September 26	at **Buffalo Bills**	**W** 22–13	2–1	Rich Stadium	Recap
5	October 4	Washington Redskins	**W** 17–10	3–1	Joe Robbie Stadium	Recap
6	October 10	at Cleveland Browns	**W** 24–14	4–1	Cleveland Stadium	Recap
7	Bye					
8	October 24	**Indianapolis Colts**	**W** 41–27	5–1	Joe Robbie Stadium	Recap
9	October 31	Kansas City Chiefs	**W** 30–10	6–1	Joe Robbie Stadium	Recap
10	November 7	at **New York Jets**	**L** 10–27	6–2	Giants Stadium	Recap
11	November 14	at Philadelphia Eagles	**W** 19–14	7–2	Veterans Stadium	Recap
12	November 21	**New England Patriots**	**W** 17–13	8–2	Joe Robbie Stadium	Recap
13	November 25	at Dallas Cowboys	**W** 16–14	9–2	Texas Stadium	Recap
14	December 5	New York Giants	**L** 14–19	9–3	Joe Robbie Stadium	Recap
15	December 13	Pittsburgh Steelers	**L** 20–21	9–4	Joe Robbie Stadium	Recap
16	December 19	**Buffalo Bills**	**L** 34–47	9–5	Joe Robbie Stadium	Recap
17	December 27	at San Diego Chargers	**L** 20–45	9–6	Jack Murphy Stadium	Recap
18	January 2	at **New England Patriots**	**L** 27–33 (OT)	9–7	Foxboro Stadium	Recap
Note: Intra-division opponents are in **bold** text.

=== Game summaries ===
==== Week 13 ====
Team	1	2	3	4	Total
• Dolphins	7	0	3	6	16
Cowboys	0	14	0	0	14

- Date: November 25 (Thanksgiving Day)
- Location: Texas Stadium, Irving, Texas
- Game start: 3:00 p.m.
- Game attendance: 60,198
- Game weather: Snow; 32 °F (0 °C); wind 15 mph (24 km/h)
- Referee: Ed Hochuli
- TV announcers (NBC): Dick Enberg and Bob Trumpy

Scoring summary
Q1	MIA	Keith Byars 77 yard run (Pete Stoyanovich kick)	MIA 7–0
Q2	DAL	Kevin Williams 4 yard pass from Troy Aikman (Eddie Murray kick)	Tie 7–7
Q2	DAL	Kevin Williams 64 yard punt return (Eddie Murray kick)	DAL 14–7
Q3	MIA	Pete Stoyanovich 20 yard field goal	DAL 14–10
Q4	MIA	Pete Stoyanovich 31 yard field goal	DAL 14–13
Q4	MIA	Pete Stoyanovich 19 yard field goal	MIA 16–14

==== Week 16 ====
Buffalo (9–4) at Miami (9–4)

Team	1	2	3	4	Total
• Bills	9	17	21	0	47
Dolphins	7	13	7	7	34

- Date: December 19
- Location: Joe Robbie Stadium, Miami Gardens, Florida
- Game start: 1:00 p.m. EST
- Elapsed time: 2:59.44
- Game attendance: 71,597
- Game weather: 71 °F (22 °C) • 7 miles per hour (11 km/h; 6.1 kn)
- Referee: Howard Roe
- TV announcers (NBC): Dick Enberg and Bob Trumpy

=== Standings ===
AFC East
	W	L	T	PCT	PF	PA	STK
^{(1)} Buffalo Bills	12	4	0	.750	329	242	W4
Miami Dolphins	9	7	0	.563	349	351	L5
New York Jets	8	8	0	.500	270	247	L3
New England Patriots	5	11	0	.313	238	286	W4
Indianapolis Colts	4	12	0	.250	189	378	L4
