= 1992 Miami Dolphins season =

27th season in franchise history; last appearance in AFC Championship game

- General manager: Eddie Jones
- Head coach: Don Shula
- Offensive coordinator: Gary Stevens
- Defensive coordinator: Tom Olivadotti
- Home stadium: Joe Robbie Stadium

Results
- Record: 11–5
- Division place: 1st AFC East
- Playoffs: Won Divisional Playoffs (vs. Chargers) 31–0; Lost AFC Championship (vs. Bills) 10–29
- Pro Bowlers: 3: QB Dan Marino; LT Richmond Webb; TE Keith Jackson

The 1992 Miami Dolphins season was the franchise's 27th season in the National Football League. The season began with the team attempting to improve on their 8–8 record in 1991. Because of the impact of Hurricane Andrew, the Dolphins' scheduled Week 1 home game against New England was moved to Week 7 because both teams already had a bye scheduled for that week and could slot the rescheduled contest in without other changes being required.

The season was a success as the Dolphins finished the season 11–5, won the AFC East and returned to the playoffs after a one-year absence. Keith Jackson, who signed a four-year, $6 million contract, made his Miami Dolphins debut in a 37–10 win versus the eventual AFC champion Buffalo Bills. Jackson recorded four receptions and 64 receiving yards, including a 24-yard touchdown score.

In the Divisional Playoffs, Miami shut out the San Diego Chargers 31–0 and the following week they played host to their AFC East rivals, the Buffalo Bills in the AFC Championship Game. Five turnovers and a huge disparity in the running game led to a 29–10 loss. As of 2025, this is the last time the Dolphins reached the AFC Championship Game.

== Offseason ==
=== NFL draft ===
1992 Miami Dolphins draft
Round	Pick	Player	Position	School
1	7	Troy Vincent	Defensive Back	Wisconsin
1	12	Marco Coleman	Defensive End	Georgia Tech
2	43	Eddie Blake	Offensive lineman	Auburn
3	70	Larry Webster	Defensive Tackle	Maryland
4	97	Dwight Hollier	Linebacker	North Carolina
5	124	Christopher Perez	Offensive Tackle	Kansas
6	155	Roosevelt Collins	Linebacker	TCU
7	199	Dave Moore	Tight End	Pittsburgh
8	209	Andre Powell	Linebacker	Penn State
9	236	Tony Tellington	Defensive Back	Youngstown State
10	267	Raoul Spears	Running Back	USC
11	294	Lee Miles	Wide Receiver	Baylor
11	296	Mike Barsotti	Quarterback	Fresno State
12	321	Milton Biggins	Tight End	Western Kentucky
12	328	Kameno Bell	Running Back	Illinois

=== Undrafted free agents ===
1992 undrafted free agent of note
Player	Position	College
Bernie Parmalee	Running back	Ball State

== Personnel ==
=== Staff / Coaches ===
1992 Miami Dolphins staff
Front office: President – Tim Robbie; Executive vice president/general manager – Eddie Jones; Assistant general manager – Bryan Wiedmeier; Director of player personnel – Tom Heckert, Sr.; Director of college scouting – Tom Braatz; Head coaches: Head coach – Don Shula; Assistant head coach/offensive line – John Sandusky; Offensive coaches: Offense/quarterbacks – Gary Stevens; Offensive backs – Carl Taseff; Wide receivers – Larry Seiple; Assistant offensive line – Dwight Stephenson; Coaches' assistant – Tony Nathan; Coaches' assistant – Mike Shula	Defensive coaches: Defense – Tom Olivadotti; Defensive line – Joe Greene; Linebackers – George Hill; Defensive backs – Mel Phillips; Special teams coaches: Special teams – Mike Westhoff; Strength and conditioning: Strength and conditioning – Junior Wade

=== Final roster ===
1992 Miami Dolphins roster
Quarterbacks (QB): 13 Dan Marino; 19 Scott Mitchell; Running backs (RB): 21 Mark Higgs; 44 Bobby Humphrey; 49 Tony Paige FB; 30 Bernie Parmalee KR; 22 James Saxon FB; Wide receivers (WR): 86 Fred Banks; 83 Mark Clayton; 85 Mark Duper; 89 Tony Martin; 82 Scott Miller PR; 87 Mike Williams KR; Tight ends (TE): 84 Greg Baty LS; 80 Ferrell Edmunds; 88 Keith Jackson	Offensive linemen (OL): 65 Jeff Dellenbach T; 74 Mark Dennis T; 62 Harry Galbreath G; 69 Keith Sims G; 63 Jeff Uhlenhake C; 78 Richmond Webb T; 60 Bert Weidner C/G; 61 Gene Williams G; Defensive linemen (DL): 90 Marco Coleman DE; 91 Jeff Cross DE; 97 Jeff Hunter DE; 99 Chuck Klingbeil NT; 95 T. J. Turner; 79 Larry Webster	Linebackers (LB): 52 Roosevelt Collins OLB; 51 Bryan Cox LB; 92 David Griggs OLB; 59 John Grimsley ILB; 50 Dwight Hollier LB; 93 Cliff Odom ILB; 56 John Offerdahl ILB; Defensive backs (DB): 36 Stephen Braggs CB; 37 J. B. Brown CB; 35 Kerry Glenn CB; 29 Liffort Hobley SS; 47 Darrell Malone CB; 25 Louis Oliver FS; 23 Troy Vincent CB; 26 Jarvis Williams SS; Special teams (ST): 4 Reggie Roby P; 10 Pete Stoyanovich K	Practice squad: 43 Chuck Carswell CB; 23 Charles Pharms S; 76 Blaine Rose G; Reserve: 32 Bruce Alexander CB (IR); 66 Eddie Blake NT (NF-Inj.); 53 Ned Bolcar LB (PUP); 34 Aaron Craver (IR); 42 Chris Green CB (IR); 45 Bobby Harden S (IR); 24 Vestee Jackson (IR); 58 Mark Sander LB (IR); 9 Scott Secules QB (IR); Rookies in italics 47 active, 9 reserve, 3 practice squad

== Regular season ==
=== Schedule ===
Week	Date	Opponent	Result	Record	Venue	Attendance
1	Bye					
2	September 14	at Cleveland Browns	**W** 27–23	1–0	Cleveland Municipal Stadium	74,765
3	September 20	Los Angeles Rams	**W** 26–10	2–0	Joe Robbie Stadium	55,945
4	September 27	at Seattle Seahawks	**W** 19–17	3–0	Kingdome	59,374
5	October 4	at **Buffalo Bills**	**W** 37–10	4–0	Rich Stadium	80,368
6	October 11	Atlanta Falcons	**W** 21–17	5–0	Joe Robbie Stadium	68,633
7	October 18	**New England Patriots**	**W** 38–17	6–0	Joe Robbie Stadium	57,282
8	October 25	**Indianapolis Colts**	**L** 20–31	6–1	Joe Robbie Stadium	61,117
9	November 1	at **New York Jets**	**L** 14–26	6–2	Giants Stadium	69,313
10	November 8	at **Indianapolis Colts**	**W** 28–0	7–2	Hoosier Dome	59,892
11	November 16	**Buffalo Bills**	**L** 20–26	7–3	Joe Robbie Stadium	70,629
12	November 22	Houston Oilers	**W** 19–16	8–3	Joe Robbie Stadium	63,597
13	November 29	at New Orleans Saints	**L** 13–24	8–4	Louisiana Superdome	68,591
14	December 6	at San Francisco 49ers	**L** 3–27	8–5	Candlestick Park	58,474
15	December 14	Los Angeles Raiders	**W** 20–7	9–5	Joe Robbie Stadium	67,098
16	December 20	New York Jets	**W** 19–17	10–5	Joe Robbie Stadium	68,275
17	December 27	at **New England Patriots**	**W** 16–13 (OT)	11–5	Foxboro Stadium	34,726
Note: Intra-division opponents are in **bold** text.

=== Standings ===
AFC East
	W	L	T	PCT	DIV	CONF	PF	PA	STK
^{(2)} Miami Dolphins	11	5	0	.688	5–3	9–3	340	281	W3
^{(4)} Buffalo Bills	11	5	0	.688	5–3	7–5	381	283	L1
Indianapolis Colts	9	7	0	.563	5–3	7–7	216	302	W5
New York Jets	4	12	0	.250	3–5	4–8	220	315	L3
New England Patriots	2	14	0	.125	2–6	2–10	205	363	L5

== Playoffs ==
=== AFC Divisional Playoff Jan. 10, 1993 ===
Miami Dolphins 31, San Diego Chargers 0

Quarter	1	2	3	4	Total
Chargers	0	0	0	0	0
Dolphins	0	21	0	10	31

at Joe Robbie Stadium, Miami, Florida

- Game time: 4:00 p.m. EST
- Game weather: 84 °F (29 °C), rain
- Game attendance: 71,224
- Referee: Johnny Grier
- TV announcers (NBC): Dick Enberg and Bob Trumpy

The Dolphins defense shut out the Chargers, holding San Diego quarterback Stan Humphries to just 18 completions on 44 pass attempts for 140 yards and intercepting four passes. Dolphins quarterback Dan Marino threw 3 touchdown passes in the second quarter - all of Marino's touchdowns were set up by interceptions. As of 2025, this remains the Dolphins last win in the Divisional Round.

=== AFC Championship Game Jan. 17, 1993 ===
Buffalo Bills 29, Miami Dolphins 10

Quarter	1	2	3	4	Total
Bills	3	10	10	6	29
Dolphins	3	0	0	7	10

at Joe Robbie Stadium, Miami, Florida

- Game time: 12:30 p.m. EST
- Game weather: 75 °F (24 °C), clear
- Game attendance: 72,703
- Referee: Bob McElwee
- TV announcers (NBC): Dick Enberg and Bob Trumpy

The Bills intercepted Dolphins quarterback Dan Marino twice, recovered 3 fumbles, forced 4 sacks, and held Miami to just 33 rushing yards. With the loss, the Dolphins failed to advance to the Super Bowl for the first time since 1984. As of 2025, this remains their last appearance in the AFC Championship.

== Awards and honors ==
- Dan Marino, AFC Pro Bowl Selection
- Dan Marino, All-Pro Selection
