= 1989 Miami Dolphins season =

24th season in franchise history

- Head coach: Don Shula
- Home stadium: Joe Robbie Stadium

Results
- Record: 8–8
- Division place: 3rd AFC East
- Playoffs: Failed to qualify
- Pro Bowlers: 3: ILB John Offerdahl; TE Ferrell Edmunds; P Reggie Roby

The 1989 Miami Dolphins season was the team's 24th as a member of the National Football League (NFL). The Dolphins improved upon their previous season's 6–10 W-L record, winning eight games. Despite this improvement they failed to qualify for the playoffs for the fourth consecutive season, tying the longest such record in franchise history when the Dolphins failed to make the playoffs from 1966 to 1969. This was also the longest such record for coach Don Shula in his NFL career. 1989 was summed up for Miami in its season premiere and season finale, both losses at home: Buffalo stunned the Dolphins when they scored a TD as time ran out to win in week 1, and Kansas City won in week 16 in a contest where the gametime temperature was 32 degrees, a record for the coldest home game the Dolphins had ever played up to that time.

Shortly after the season ended, Miami Dolphins founder Joe Robbie died on January 7, 1990, at the age of 73.

This was the first of 15 consecutive non-losing seasons for the Dolphins.

== Offseason ==
=== Draft ===
1989 Miami Dolphins draft
Round	Pick	Player	Position	College	Notes
1	9	Sammie Smith	Running back	Florida State	
1	25	Louis Oliver	Safety	Florida	
4	92	David Holmes	Defensive back	Syracuse	
5	121	Jeff Uhlenhake	Center	Ohio State	
6	147	Wes Pritchett	Linebacker	Notre Dame	
7	176	Jim Zdelar	Tackle	Youngstown State	
8	203	Pete Stoyanovich	Kicker	Indiana	
9	232	Dana Batiste	Linebacker	Texas A&M	
10	259	Deval Glover	Wide receiver	Syracuse	
10	275	Greg Ross	Defensive tackle	Memphis State	
11	288	Bert Weidner	Defensive tackle	Kent State	
12	315	J. B. Brown	Cornerback	Maryland	
Made roster

=== Undrafted free agents ===
1989 undrafted free agent of note
Player	Position	College
Andre Brown	Wide receiver	Miami (FL)

== Personnel ==
=== Staff ===
1989 Miami Dolphins staff
Front office: President – Joe Robbie; Executive vice-president/general manager – Mike Robbie; Vice-president – Don Shula; Vice-president of administration and Finance – Eddie Jones; Director of pro personnel – Charley Winner; Director of college scouting – Tom Heckert, Sr.; Head coaches: Head coach – Don Shula; Assistant head coach – John Sandusky; Offensive coaches: Quarterbacks/pass offense – Gary Stevens; Offensive backs – Carl Taseff; Receivers – Larry Seiple; Offensive line – John Sandusky; Assistant offensive line – Mike Westhoff; Coaches' assistant – Tony Nathan	Defensive coaches: Defense – Tom Olivadotti; Defensive line – Dan Sekanovich; Linebackers – George Hill; Defensive backs – Mel Phillips; Special teams coaches: Special teams – Mike Westhoff; Strength and conditioning: Strength and conditioning – Junior Wade

=== Roster ===
1989 Miami Dolphins roster
Quarterbacks (QB): 13 Dan Marino; 9 Scott Secules; 18 Cliff Stoudt; Running backs (RB): 36 Tom Brown FB; 27 Lorenzo Hampton KR; 11 Jim Jensen FB; 20 Marc Logan; 33 Sammie Smith; Wide receivers (WR): 86 Fred Banks; 82 Andre Brown; 83 Mark Clayton; 85 Mark Duper; 89 Tony Martin; 81 Scott Schwedes PR; Tight ends (TE): 80 Ferrell Edmunds; 88 Brian Kinchen LS	Offensive linemen (OL): 77 Louis Cheek T; 65 Jeff Dellenbach; 74 Mark Dennis T; 61 Roy Foster G; 62 Harry Galbreath G; 72 Ronnie Lee T; 76 Tom Toth G; 63 Jeff Uhlenhake C; Defensive linemen (DL): 97 John Bosa DE; 98 Jackie Cline DE; 91 Jeff Cross DE; 90 Eric Kumerow DE; 70 Brian Sochia NT; 95 T. J. Turner DE	Linebackers (LB): 59 Bob Brudzinski OLB; 51 Greg Clark ILB; 55 Hugh Green OLB; 92 David Griggs OLB; 54 E. J. Junior OLB; 55 Barry Krauss ILB; 56 John Offerdahl ILB; Defensive backs (DB): 37 J. B. Brown CB; 42 Ernest Gibson CB; 29 Liffort Hobley FS; 44 Paul Lankford CB; 28 Don McNeal CB; 25 Louis Oliver FS; 24 Rodney Thomas CB; 26 Jarvis Williams SS; Special teams (ST): 4 Reggie Roby P; 10 Pete Stoyanovich K	Practice squad: 75 Pat Marlatt DE; 71 Barry Pettyjohn T; 60 Bert Weidner NT; Reserve: 50 Dave Ahrens ILB (IR); 66 Dana Batiste LB (IR); 30 Ron Davenport FB (IR); 79 Jon Giesler T (IR); 99 Rick Graf OLB (IR); 41 African Grant DB (IR); 84 Bruce Hardy TE (IR); 73 Greg Johnson T (IR); 49 William Judson CB (IR); 23 Troy Stradford RB (IR); 47 active, 10 inactive, 3 practice squad Rookies in italics

== Regular season ==
=== Schedule ===
Week	Date	Opponent	Result	Record	Venue	Attendance
1	September 10	**Buffalo Bills**	**L** 24–27	0–1	Joe Robbie Stadium	54,541
2	September 17	at **New England Patriots**	**W** 24–10	1–1	Sullivan Stadium	57,043
3	September 24	**New York Jets**	**L** 33–40	1–2	Joe Robbie Stadium	65,908
4	October 1	at Houston Oilers	**L** 7–39	1–3	Astrodome	53,326
5	October 8	Cleveland Browns	**W** 13–10 (OT)	2–3	Joe Robbie Stadium	58,444
6	October 15	at Cincinnati Bengals	**W** 20–13	3–3	Riverfront Stadium	58,184
7	October 22	Green Bay Packers	**W** 23–20	4–3	Joe Robbie Stadium	56,624
8	October 29	at **Buffalo Bills**	**L** 17–31	4–4	Rich Stadium	80,208
9	November 5	**Indianapolis Colts**	**W** 19–13	5–4	Joe Robbie Stadium	52,680
10	November 12	at **New York Jets**	**W** 31–23	6–4	Giants Stadium	65,923
11	November 19	at Dallas Cowboys	**W** 17–14	7–4	Texas Stadium	56,044
12	November 26	Pittsburgh Steelers	**L** 14–34	7–5	Joe Robbie Stadium	59,936
13	December 3	at Kansas City Chiefs	**L** 21–26	7–6	Arrowhead Stadium	54,610
14	December 10	**New England Patriots**	**W** 31–10	8–6	Joe Robbie Stadium	55,918
15	December 17	at **Indianapolis Colts**	**L** 13–42	8–7	Hoosier Dome	55,665
16	December 24	Kansas City Chiefs	**L** 24–27	8–8	Joe Robbie Stadium	43,612

Note: Intra-division opponents are in bold text.

=== Standings ===
AFC East
	W	L	T	PCT	DIV	CONF	PF	PA	STK
^{(3)} Buffalo Bills	9	7	0	.563	6–2	8–4	409	317	W1
Indianapolis Colts	8	8	0	.500	4–4	7–5	298	301	L1
Miami Dolphins	8	8	0	.500	4–4	6–8	331	379	L2
New England Patriots	5	11	0	.313	4–4	5–7	297	391	L3
New York Jets	4	12	0	.250	2–6	3–9	253	411	L3

=== Season summary ===
==== Week 1 ====
Week One: Buffalo Bills (0–0) at Miami Dolphins (0–0)

Quarter	1	2	3	4	Total
**Bills**	3	0	10	14	**27**
Dolphins	0	10	7	7	**24**

at Joe Robbie Stadium, Miami, Florida

- Date: September 10, 1989
- Game time: 4:00 p.m. EST
- Game weather: 83 °F (28 °C)
- Game attendance: 54,541
- Referee: Jerry Markbreit
- Pro-Football-Reference.com, The Football Database

Game information

**First quarter**

- BUF – Scott Norwood 34 yard field goal, 2:34. Bills 3–0. Drive:

**Second quarter**

- MIA – Troy Stradford 1-yard run (Pete Stoyanovich kick), 8:48. Dolphins 7–3. Drive:
- MIA – Pete Stoyanovich 29-yard field goal, 0:03. Dolphins 10–3. Drive:

**Third quarter**

- BUF – Larry Kinnebrew 2-yard run (Scott Norwood kick), 11:58. Tie 10–10. Drive:
- MIA – Marc Logan 2-yard blocked punt return (Pete Stoyanovich kick), 7:03. Dolphins 17–10. Drive:
- BUF – Scott Norwood 37-yard field goal, 2:11. Dolphins 17–13. Drive:

**Fourth quarter**

- MIA – Andre Brown 8-yard pass from Dan Marino (Pete Stoyanovich kick), 4:17. Dolphins 24–13. Drive:
- BUF – Flip Johnson 26-yard pass from Jim Kelly (Scott Norwood kick), 2:50. Dolphins 24–20. Drive:
- BUF – Jim Kelly 2-yard run (Scott Norwood kick), 0:00. Bills 27–24. **Drive: 51 yards.**

51

Top passers

- BUF – Jim Kelly – 25/40, 265 yards, TD
- MIA – Dan Marino – 25/38, 255 yards, TD, 2 INT

Top rushers

- BUF – Thurman Thomas – 13 rushes, 94 yards
- MIA – Troy Stradford – 12 rushes, 43 yards, TD

Top receivers

- BUF – Thurman Thomas – 8 receptions, 65 yards
- MIA – Ferrell Edmunds – 5 receptions, 58 yards
