= Dan Marino =

American football player (born 1961)

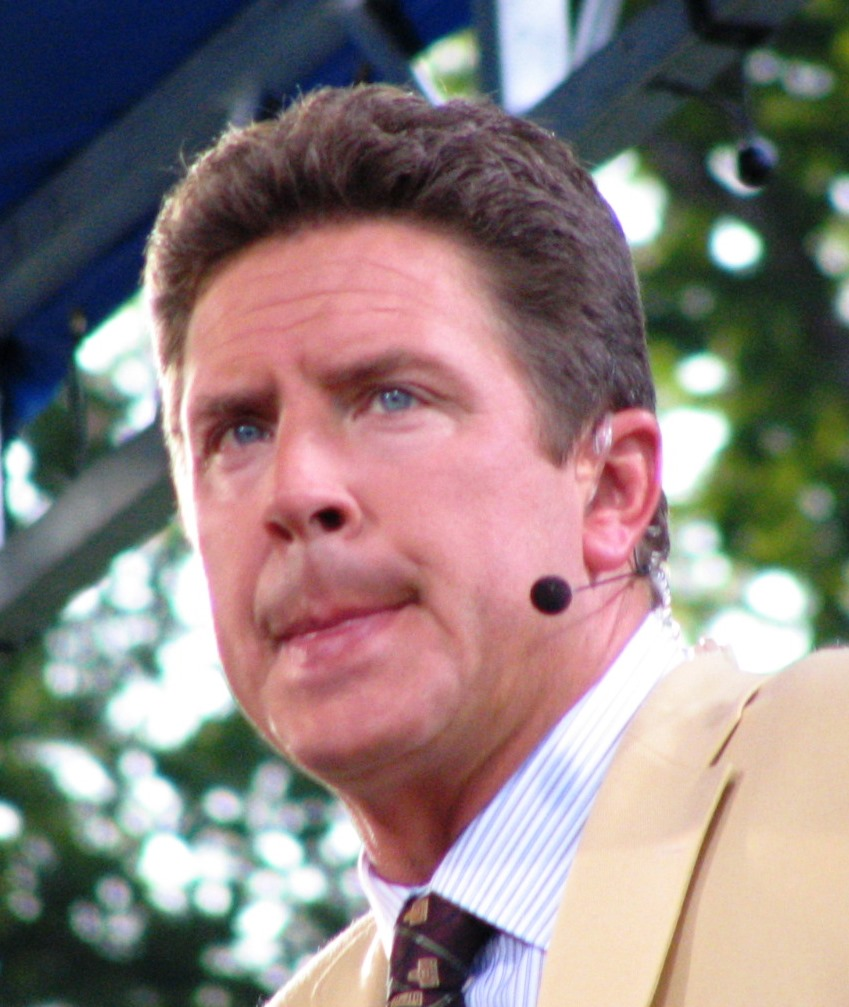
- Marino preparing for a 2005 ESPN interview

Miami Dolphins
- Title: Special advisor

Personal information
- Born: September 15, 1961 (age 65); Pittsburgh, Pennsylvania, U.S.
- Listed height: 6 ft 4 in (1.93 m)
- Listed weight: 224 lb (102 kg)

Career information
- Position: Quarterback (No. 13)
- High school: Central Catholic (Pittsburgh)
- College: Pittsburgh (1979–1982)
- NFL draft: 1983: 1st round, 27th overall pick

Career history

Playing
- Miami Dolphins (1983–1999)

Operations
- Miami Dolphins (2014–present) Special advisor

Awards and highlights
- NFL Most Valuable Player (1984); NFL Offensive Player of the Year (1984); NFL Comeback Player of the Year (1994); NFL Man of the Year (1998); The Sporting News NFL Rookie of the Year (1983); 3x First-team All-Pro (1984–1986); 5× Second-team All-Pro (1983, 1988, 1992, 1994, 1995); 9× Pro Bowl (1983–1987, 1991, 1992, 1994, 1995); 5× NFL passing yards leader (1984–1986, 1988, 1992); 3× NFL passing touchdowns leader (1984–1986); NFL passer rating leader (1984); NFL 100th Anniversary All-Time Team; PFWA All-Rookie Team (1983); George Halas Award (1995); Miami Dolphins Honor Roll; Miami Dolphins No. 13 retired; Dolphins Walk of Fame (2011); First-team All-American (1981); NCAA passing touchdowns leader (1981); First-team All-East (1981); Pittsburgh Panthers No. 13 retired; NFL records: Lowest sack percentage, season: 1.0% (1988); Most seasons leading league, completions: 6; Most seasons leading league, pass attempts: 5

Career NFL statistics
- Passing attempts: 8,358
- Passing completions: 4,967
- Completion percentage: 59.4%
- TD–INT: 420–252
- Passing yards: 61,361
- Passer rating: 86.4
- Stats at Pro Football Reference
- Pro Football Hall of Fame
- College Football Hall of Fame

Daniel Constantine Marino Jr. (/məˈriːnoʊ/ mə-REE-noh; born September 15, 1961) is an American former professional football quarterback who played in the National Football League (NFL) for 15 seasons with the Miami Dolphins. He played college football for the Pittsburgh Panthers, earning first-team All-American honors in 1981. Marino was the last quarterback taken in the first round of the famed quarterback class of 1983. He held or currently holds dozens of NFL records associated with the quarterback position and is recognized among the greatest quarterbacks in American football history.

Best remembered for his quick release and powerful arm, Marino helped the Dolphins become consistent postseason contenders, leading them to the playoffs ten times and one Super Bowl appearance in XIX, although a title victory ultimately eluded him during his career. Marino is considered by many to be one of the greatest players to never win a Super Bowl and has the most career victories of quarterbacks not to win a title at 155.

A nine-time Pro Bowl selection, eight-time first (3) or second (5) team All-Pro, and All-AFC six times, Marino was voted NFL Rookie of the Year by Sporting News. The following season in 1984, Marino was the NFL Most Valuable Player (MVP) and Offensive Player of the Year, when he set single-season records of 5,084 passing yards, 48 touchdown passes, nine 300-yard passing games, and four 400-yard passing games. He was voted the 1994 NFL Comeback Player of the Year, and the 1998 NFL Walter Payton Man of the Year. Marino threw the most TD passes of the entire decade of the 1980s (220) despite only playing in 7 seasons of the decade (1983–89); and threw for the most passing yards in the entire decade of the 1990s (33,508). Marino is the only quarterback in NFL history to lead in either category in back-to-back decades, and the lone one to lead the league in all three passing categories of completions, passing yards, and touchdown passes for three consecutive years (1984–1986).

At the time of his retirement, Marino held more than 40 NFL single-season and career passing records (many of which have since been surpassed), including career passing attempts (8,358), completions (4,967), passing yards (61,361), and touchdown passes (420). His career passer rating of 86.4 was the fourth-highest in NFL history (fifth when including stats from the AAFC). Marino was the first quarterback in NFL history to reach 5,000 yards passing in a season (1984); 50,000 and 60,000 career passing yards respectively, and also the first quarterback to reach 40-plus touchdown passes in a season (48 in 1984), and 400 career touchdown passes.

Marino was enshrined into the Miami Dolphins Honor Roll immediately after his retirement in 2000, inducted into the College Football Hall of Fame in 2003, inducted into the Pro Football Hall of Fame in 2005 in his first year of eligibility, and is currently one of only three former Miami Dolphins to have his jersey number retired. In 2019, Marino was named to the NFL 100th Anniversary All-Time Team as one of the 10 greatest quarterbacks in NFL history, as determined by a panel of coaches and media members.

== Early life ==
Born and raised in Pittsburgh, Pennsylvania, Marino is of Italian and Polish ancestry. The oldest child of Daniel and Veronica (Kolczynski) Marino, he has two younger sisters, Cindi and Debbie. His father delivered newspapers for the Pittsburgh Post-Gazette, and Marino grew up on Parkview Avenue in the South Oakland neighborhood. He attended St. Regis Catholic Elementary School and graduated from Central Catholic High School in 1979, where he starred in baseball for the Vikings and won Parade All-American honors in football. In the 1979 Major League Baseball draft, Marino was selected in the fourth round by the Kansas City Royals, but decided to play college football instead.

== College career ==
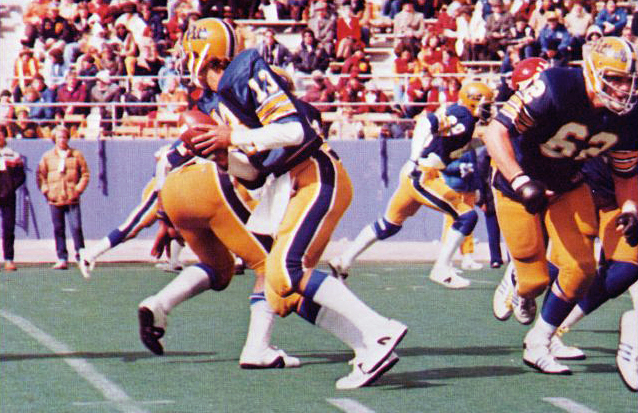
University of Pittsburgh freshman (1979)

Marino attended the University of Pittsburgh, and played for the university's Pittsburgh Panthers football team from 1979 to 1982. As a freshman in 1979, Marino led the Panthers in a 24–17 triumph over West Virginia in the Backyard Brawl and a 29–14 win over longtime rival Penn State. Pitt's 1980 Marino-led team finished No. 2 in the season-ending rankings (The New York Times computer poll rated Pitt as No. 1). Marino was part of an elite team during those two years that included two other future NFL Hall of Fame players: Defensive lineman Rickey Jackson and center Russ Grimm, as well as future Pro Bowl linebacker Hugh Green and future Pro Bowl guard Mark May. In 1980, Pitt added future NFL players Bill Maas, Dwight Collins, and Tim Lewis, while their offensive line got a third future Pro Bowl player: tackle Jimbo Covert. "There were games when my uniform never got dirty," Marino once remarked. "There were games when I never hit the ground. That's incredible."

Following the 1981 regular season, Marino led the Panthers, who had been ranked No. 1 most of the season, to a last-minute triumph over the No. 2 Georgia Bulldogs in the 1982 Sugar Bowl by throwing a game-winning pass to tight end John Brown with less than a minute remaining in the game. Marino later cited this as the most memorable pass he'd thrown in his college career. He led the nation with 34 passing touchdowns. Overall, during the three seasons from 1979 through 1981, Pitt garnered 33 wins with only 3 losses (three straight 11–1 seasons) and was constantly ranked in the top 5 of both major media polls. The Pitt football team's fortunes and Marino's statistics dipped during his senior year, which saw the team transition from head coach Jackie Sherrill to new coach Foge Fazio, culminating in a 7–3 loss in the 1983 Cotton Bowl Classic to Southern Methodist University and their "Pony Express" of Eric Dickerson and Craig James. Marino finished ninth in voting for the Heisman Trophy in 1982, after finishing fourth the previous year. Marino finished his four college seasons with 8,597 passing yards, 79 touchdowns, and 69 interceptions.

== Professional career ==
=== NFL draft ===
Marino's selection status in the 1983 NFL draft plummeted after his weaker senior season at Pitt and rumors of recreational drug use. Five other quarterbacks—Ken O'Brien, Tony Eason, Todd Blackledge, and Hall of Famers Jim Kelly and John Elway—were drafted ahead of him in the first round. Bill Hillgrove, who was with the Marino family on draft day, later recalled that when the New York Jets selected O'Brien, Marino "became visibly ill". (O'Brien, who played for Division II Cal-Davis, was so obscure that Marino later asked his agent Marvin Demoff "Who is Ken O'Brien?")

The Miami Dolphins chose Marino as the 27th pick in the first round. He did not expect to be available for the team to draft, so he never spoke to head coach Don Shula or anyone else from the Dolphins before the coach called after the selection. Opinion was divided on the wisdom of the team's decision; Chris Berman said that Shula was "the best", but Paul Zimmerman was skeptical of the coaching staff's ability to help Marino "overcome the problems he's had". Shula later said that being passed up by so many teams "motivated [Marino] to show everybody else what a mistake that they had made".

=== Early years and Super Bowl appearance ===
Marino was the first draft pick in the history of the United States Football League, selected by the Los Angeles Express. He did not sign with the team, choosing instead to sign with the Dolphins. After starting the season as a backup to incumbent starter David Woodley, Marino was given his first NFL start in week 6 versus the Buffalo Bills. Marino and Miami lost that game 38–35 in overtime. As a rookie, Marino set several records: he posted a 96.0 passer rating, he was selected to the Pro Bowl as a rookie, he had the lowest percentage of passes intercepted with 2.03, he was the only rookie quarterback to lead a conference in passing, and he had the highest passing completion percentage with 58.45. Marino was The Sporting News Rookie of the Year and was also named 2nd Team AP All-Pro; the first and still only rookie QB to be named All-Pro in the Super Bowl era. The Dolphins finished the season with a 12–4 record and advanced to the AFC divisional playoffs, where Marino threw two touchdown passes in his playoff debut. However, he also threw two interceptions as the team lost to the 9–7 Seattle Seahawks, 27–20.

In his second season, Marino broke six NFL full-season passing records, including the records for most touchdown passes (48, surpassed by Peyton Manning in 2004) and most passing yards (5,084, surpassed by Drew Brees in 2011), and was selected as the NFL's Most Valuable Player. He was also voted 1984 Offensive Player of the Year, and 1st Team AP All-Pro. Marino led the league in completions, yards, and TD passes and the Dolphins finished with a 14–2 regular-season record, clinching home-field advantage for the playoffs. In the Divisional round, the Dolphins avenged their playoff loss of the previous season to the Seattle Seahawks 31–10 behind Marino's 262 passing yards and 3 touchdowns. The next week the Dolphins defeated the Pittsburgh Steelers in the AFC Championship Game 45–28. In that game, Marino set AFC Championship Game records with 421 passing yards and 4 touchdowns, despite throwing his last pass of the game with 11:07 still remaining on the clock. Both records still stand as of 2026.

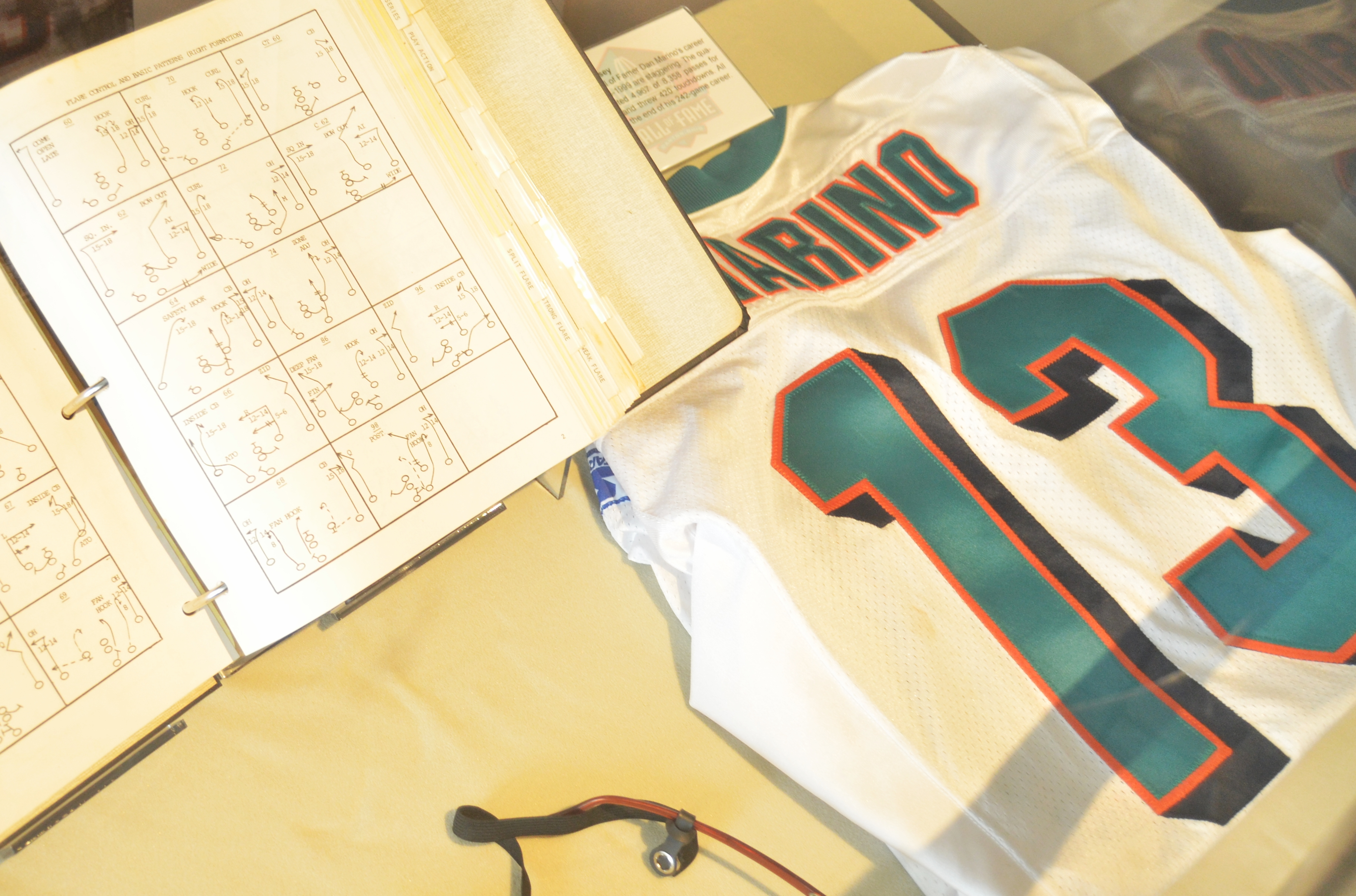
Marino's jersey shown at the Pro Football Hall of Fame in Canton, Ohio

In Super Bowl XIX, Marino and the Dolphins faced off against the San Francisco 49ers and Joe Montana in Palo Alto, California. The Dolphins, who had 74 rushing attempts in the previous two weeks, ran the ball only eight times in this game. Marino finished with 29 completions out of 50 attempts for 318 yards, throwing one touchdown pass and two interceptions (both late in the game with the score already decided). The Dolphins lost 38–16 in what was Marino's only Super Bowl appearance.

In 1985, Marino threw for 4,137 yards and 30 touchdowns while leading the Dolphins to the AFC Championship game. On September 29, Marino threw for 390 yards and 3 touchdowns in the Dolphins' 30–26 victory over the Denver Broncos, in the first matchup between Marino and Broncos quarterback John Elway. Then on December 2, Marino threw for 270 yards and 3 touchdowns against the vaunted Chicago Bears defense in a 38–24 victory. The loss was the only one that the Bears experienced that season. Marino again led the league in completions, yards, and touchdown passes and was named 1st Team AP All-Pro.

On September 7, 1986, 8 days shy of his 25th birthday, Marino threw his 100th touchdown pass in a 50–28 loss to San Diego. Marino accomplished that feat in just 44 games – the fastest in NFL history. In the 1986 season, Marino threw for 4,746 yards and 44 touchdowns. Marino became the first QB in NFL history to record three consecutive seasons of 30 or more touchdown passes; 48 in 1984, 30 in 1985, and 44 in 1986. Marino again led the league in completions, yards and touchdown passes (the first and only QB in NFL history to lead in all three categories for three consecutive seasons). Marino was also named 1986 first team AP All-Pro, becoming the first and still only quarterback in NFL history to be named AP All-Pro in each of their first four seasons.

In 1987, Marino threw for 3,245 yards and 26 touchdowns in a strike-shortened 12 game season. Marino's 26 touchdown passes led the AFC, marking the fourth consecutive year that he led the conference in touchdown passes. Marino was also named to the Pro Bowl, his fifth Pro Bowl selection in his five years in the league, becoming the first and still only quarterback in NFL history be elected to the Pro Bowl in each of their first five seasons.

=== Mid-career ===
In 1988, Marino threw for 4,434 yards and 28 touchdowns and was named NEA 2nd Team All-Pro despite the Dolphins finishing at 6–10. As a result of his 4,434 yards passing, Marino became the first quarterback in NFL history to throw for 4,000 or more yards in four different seasons. Marino had been tied with Dan Fouts for the most 4,000-yard passing seasons with three. Marino led the entire NFL in completions and passing yards and led the AFC in touchdown passes for a fifth consecutive year. No one else in history has led the AFC in touchdown passes for even three consecutive seasons, and only two (Peyton Manning and Patrick Mahomes) have done it back-to-back.

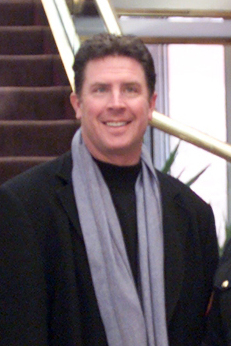
Marino in 1990

In 1992, Marino again led the Dolphins to the AFC Championship game while passing for 4,116 yards and 24 touchdowns and was named 2nd Team NEA All-Pro . His 4,116 passing yards led the entire NFL and marked the fifth time in his NFL career that he led the league in passing yards. His 24 touchdown passes led the AFC for a record 6th time.

In 1993, Miami was strongly favored at the start of the year to make it back to the AFC championship game and possibly the Super Bowl. However, after throwing a swing pass during a game in Cleveland, Marino, who was untouched on the play, crumpled to the ground in pain with a torn Achilles tendon and was out for the season. Marino later said, "I felt like I got kicked". Backup quarterback Scott Mitchell had an impressive series of starts before suffering an injury of his own. Steve DeBerg started the last 4 games of the season. Mitchell signed a free-agent contract with the Detroit Lions, and Miami signed veteran quarterback Bernie Kosar from the Dallas Cowboys as a backup. Wearing a special shoe on one foot, and having a right calf that was visibly atrophied, Marino was the starting quarterback at the opening of the 1994 season.

In the 1994 season opener, a home game versus the New England Patriots and quarterback Drew Bledsoe, the two quarterbacks put up a combined 894 yards (Marino, 473 yards; Bledsoe, 421 yards) and nine passing touchdowns (Marino, 5; Bledsoe, 4), with Miami winning 39–35. Later in the season, Marino led a comeback win on the road against the New York Jets (28–24), a game famous for Marino's execution of a fake spike for the winning touchdown pass, a play known as "The Clock Play". The Dolphins finished 10–6 as Marino passed for 4,453 yards and 30 TD passes (which again led the AFC and extended his record to a 7th time), and he was named the NFL's Comeback Player of the Year by the Pro Football Writers Association. He was also named 2nd Team AP All-Pro. After missing the postseason in 1993, Miami came back to the playoffs in 1994. Placing third overall in the AFC, Miami was pitted against the Kansas City Chiefs in what became the final NFL game played by Montana. Marino threw 257 yards and two touchdown passes, contributing to Miami's 27–17 win. The Dolphins reached the AFC Divisional Playoff round, where they competed with the San Diego Chargers. Three touchdown passes by Marino in the first half allowed the Dolphins to lead 21–6, before the Chargers staged a comeback and took the lead toward the end of the fourth quarter. In the final moments of the game, Marino tried to set up a good position for a field goal, but with little time left at the Chargers' 30-yard line, Pete Stoyanovich was forced to attempt a 48-yard field goal. Stoyanovich missed, ending the game with a 22–21 loss for Miami.

Marino started in 14 out of 16 games in the 1995 season. He suffered a hip injury in week 6 against the Indianapolis Colts and was replaced by Bernie Kosar in the following two games. Throughout the regular season, Marino threw 3,668 yards and 24 touchdowns. Despite falling to 9–7 and to third place in the AFC East, the Dolphins again advanced to the playoffs because they placed sixth in the AFC. In the wildcard round against the Buffalo Bills, Miami dominated in passing – with Marino passing 422 yards – while Buffalo was far ahead of Miami for rushing yards (341 yards). In terms of scoring, Buffalo held a wide lead throughout the game. The Dolphins remained scoreless until the fourth quarter, when they scored 22 points, which included two touchdown passes from Marino. However, Miami fell well short of a comeback and lost 37–22. Despite the Playoff disappointment, the 1995 season was a historic one for Marino as he set NFL career records for the most attempts, completions, passing yards, TD passes and 300-yard games. He was also named 2nd Team AP All-Pro.

On November 10, 1996, against Indianapolis, Marino became the first quarterback in NFL history to throw for 50,000 career passing yards.

On November 29, 1998, against New Orleans, Marino threw for three touchdowns. His second touchdown pass, a 7 yarder to wide receiver OJ McDuffie, gave him 400 for his career as Marino became the first QB in NFL History to reach 400 career TD passes.

=== Final season and retirement ===
The Dolphins opened the 1999 season on September 13 at the defending Super Bowl champions Denver Broncos on Monday Night Football. Marino threw for 215 yards and two touchdowns in the Dolphins' 38–21 victory. For that performance, Marino earned AFC Offensive Player of the Week honors. Marino earned that honor again on October 10 as he threw for 393 yards and two touchdowns in a thrilling 34–31 comeback victory over the Indianapolis Colts. On October 17 against the New England Patriots, Marino became the first quarterback in NFL history to throw for 60,000 career passing yards. He missed the next five games to a shoulder injury before returning in week 12. In the 1999 season, he appeared in 11 games and finished with 2,448 passing yards, 12 touchdowns, and 17 interceptions.

Marino's final win was his first playoff road win and his 36th comeback win, as the Dolphins defeated the Seattle Seahawks 20–17 in the Wild Card Round on January 9, 2000, in the final football game ever in the Seattle Kingdome. In the Divisional Round (January 16), also on the road, Marino and the Dolphins lost 62–7 to the Jacksonville Jaguars. The Dolphins' 55-point margin of loss was the worst in the AFC playoffs' history. Marino was replaced by backup Damon Huard after playing one series in the second half. However, he did end the first half on a high note, leading the Dolphins on an 80-yard scoring drive and throwing a 20-yard touchdown pass to receiver Oronde Gadsden with one second remaining in the half. The Jacksonville game marked the end of Jimmy Johnson's coaching career; Johnson announced his retirement the next day.

Before the 2000 season, Marino decided to retire, after declining offers from Minnesota, Tampa Bay, and his hometown of Pittsburgh when the Dolphins declined his option on his contract. Marino later admitted that he seriously considered the offer from the Vikings, but that he turned it down not because of his arm, but because he was not sure that his legs could take another season. He also appreciated the fact that unlike many of his contemporaries, he got to play his entire career with one team.

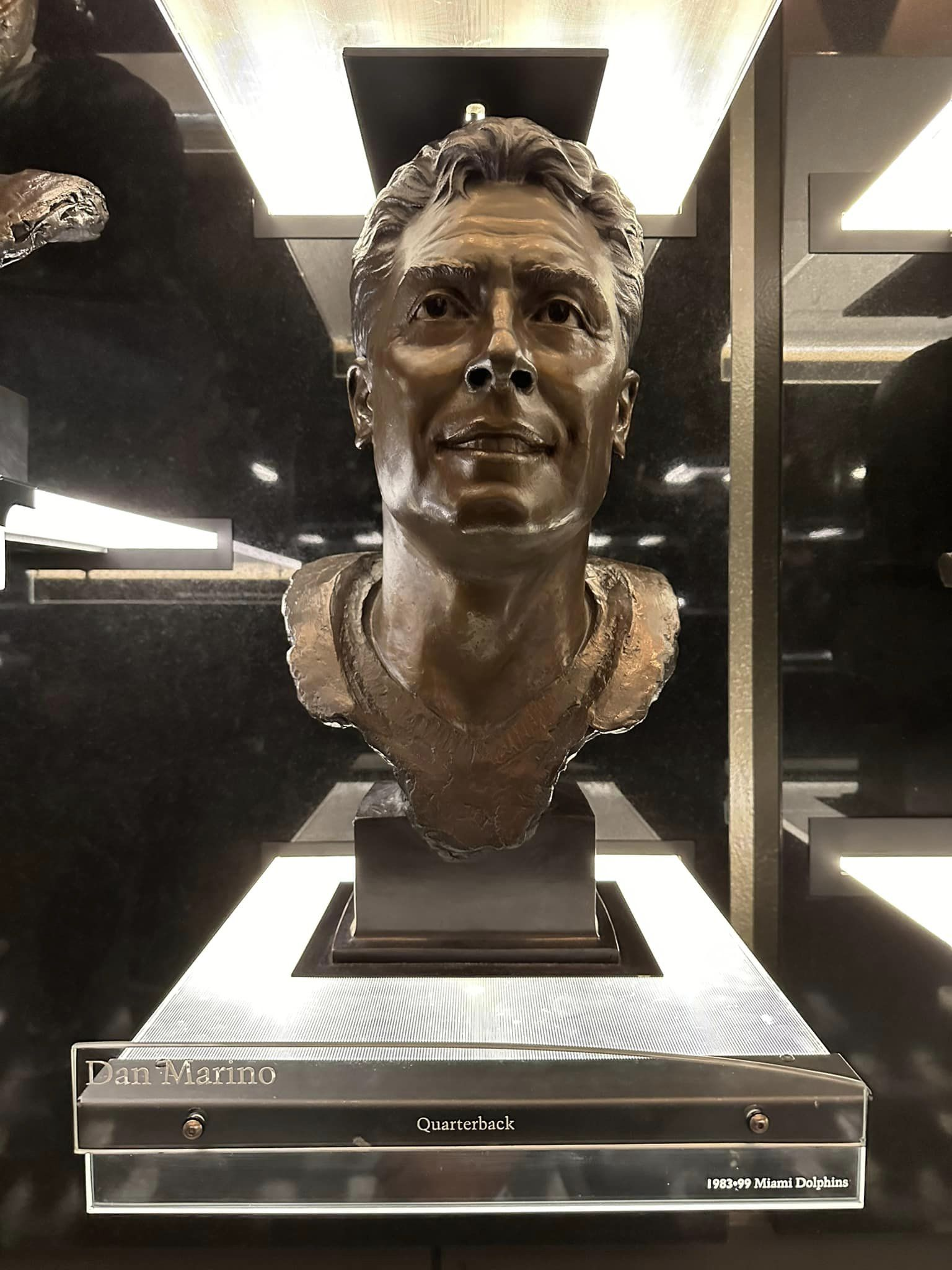
Marino's bronze bust at the Pro Football Hall of Fame

=== Legacy ===
During Marino's career, the Dolphins were perennial playoff contenders, reaching the postseason in 10 of his 17 seasons. He was selected to play in nine Pro Bowls (1983–1987, 1991, 1992, 1994, 1995), seven times as a starter, but due to injuries he only played in two of the games (1984, 1992). He was named first- or second-team All-Pro eight times and earned All-AFC honors six times. Marino is the only QB in NFL History to have won all five major individual season awards: 1983 Rookie of the Year (The Sporting News), NFL MVP (1984); NFL Offensive Player of the Year (1984); NFL Comeback Player of the Year (1994); and NFL Man of the Year (1998), which recognizes charitable work off the field. Marino threw the most TD passes in the decade of the 1980s (220) and threw for the most passing yards in the decade of the 1990s (33,508).

In 1999, Marino was ranked 27th on The Sporting News list of the 100 greatest football players, making him the highest-ranking Dolphins player. In 2010, he was ranked number 25 on the NFL's Top 100 Greatest Players list. Marino was known for his quick release, and despite the fact that he was not skilled at scrambling, Marino possessed a natural awareness in the pocket, often sliding a step or two to avoid the pass rush. As of the conclusion of the 2024 NFL regular season, Marino's 155 wins rank eighth among NFL quarterbacks, behind Tom Brady, Peyton Manning, Brett Favre, Drew Brees, Aaron Rodgers, Ben Roethlisberger, and John Elway. Marino is also the winningest quarterback without a Super Bowl victory.

== Career statistics ==
=== NFL ===
Legend
	AP NFL MVP & OPOTY
	Led the league
**Bold**	Career high

==== Regular season ====
Year	Team	Games			Passing								Rushing				Sacks		Fumbles	
Year	Team	GP	GS	Record	Cmp	Att	Pct	Yds	Avg	TD	Int	Rtg	Att	Yds	Avg	TD	Sck	SckY	Fum	Lost
1983	MIA	11	9	7–2	173	296	58.4	2,210	7.5	20	6	96.0	**28**	45	1.6	**2**	10	80	5	0
1984	MIA	16	16	**14–2**	362	564	**64.2**	**5,084**	**9.0**	**48**	17	**108.9**	**28**	−7	−0.3	0	13	120	6	0
1985	MIA	16	16	12–4	336	567	59.3	4,137	7.3	30	21	84.1	26	−24	−0.9	0	18	157	9	**6**
1986	MIA	16	16	8–8	378	**623**	60.7	4,746	7.6	44	**23**	92.5	12	−3	−0.3	0	17	119	8	3
1987	MIA	12	12	7–5	263	444	59.2	3,245	7.3	26	13	89.2	12	−5	−0.4	1	9	77	5	2
1988	MIA	16	16	6–10	354	606	58.4	4,434	7.3	28	**23**	80.8	20	−17	−0.9	0	6	31	**10**	3
1989	MIA	16	16	8–8	308	550	56.0	3,997	7.3	24	22	76.9	14	−7	−0.5	**2**	10	86	7	5
1990	MIA	16	16	12–4	306	531	57.6	3,563	6.7	21	11	82.6	16	29	1.8	0	15	90	3	1
1991	MIA	16	16	8–8	318	549	57.9	3,970	7.2	25	13	85.8	27	32	1.2	1	27	**182**	6	2
1992	MIA	16	16	11–5	330	554	59.6	4,116	7.4	24	16	85.1	20	**66**	**3.3**	0	**28**	173	5	1
1993	MIA	5	5	4–1	91	150	60.7	1,218	8.1	8	3	95.9	9	−4	−0.4	1	7	42	4	1
1994	MIA	16	16	10–6	**385**	615	62.6	4,453	7.2	30	17	89.2	22	−6	−0.3	1	18	113	9	2
1995	MIA	14	14	9–5	309	482	64.1	3,668	7.6	24	15	90.8	11	14	1.3	0	22	153	7	2
1996	MIA	13	13	7–6	221	373	59.2	2,795	7.5	17	9	87.8	11	−3	−0.3	0	18	131	4	2
1997	MIA	16	16	9–7	319	548	58.2	3,780	6.9	16	11	80.7	18	−14	−0.8	0	20	132	8	4
1998	MIA	16	16	10–6	310	537	57.7	3,497	6.5	23	15	80.0	21	−3	−0.1	1	23	178	9	4
1999	MIA	11	11	5–6	204	369	55.3	2,448	6.6	12	17	67.4	6	−6	−1.0	0	9	66	5	3
Career		242	240	147–93	4,967	8,358	59.4	61,361	7.3	420	252	86.4	301	87	0.3	9	270	1,930	110	41

==== Playoffs ====
Year	Team	Games			Passing								Rushing				Sacks		Fumbles	
Year	Team	GP	GS	Record	Cmp	Att	Pct	Yds	Avg	TD	Int	Rtg	Att	Yds	Avg	TD	Sck	SckY	Fum	Lost
1983	MIA	1	1	0–1	15	25	60.0	193	7.7	2	2	77.6	0	0	—	0	0	0	0	0
1984	MIA	3	3	**2–1**	**71**	**116**	61.2	**1,001**	**8.6**	**8**	**5**	94.1	1	0	0.0	0	**4**	**29**	1	0
1985	MIA	2	2	1–1	45	93	48.4	486	5.2	3	3	61.5	1	0	0.0	0	1	14	1	1
1990	MIA	2	2	1–1	42	79	53.2	544	6.9	5	2	85.6	**5**	−1	−0.2	**1**	2	8	1	1
1992	MIA	2	2	1–1	39	74	52.7	435	5.9	4	2	77.3	1	−2	−2.0	0	**4**	25	1	1
1994	MIA	2	2	1–1	46	67	68.7	519	7.7	5	0	**116.4**	2	**4**	**2.0**	0	2	13	1	0
1995	MIA	1	1	0–1	33	64	51.6	422	6.6	2	3	63.4	1	0	0.0	0	0	0	0	0
1997	MIA	1	1	0–1	17	43	39.5	141	3.3	0	2	29.3	1	2	**2.0**	0	**4**	21	**2**	1
1998	MIA	2	2	1–1	49	71	**69.0**	478	6.7	1	3	74.7	1	−1	−1.0	0	2	12	0	0
1999	MIA	2	2	1–1	28	55	50.9	291	5.3	2	2	63.5	2	−1	−0.5	0	3	19	**2**	**2**
Career		18	18	8–10	385	687	56.0	4,510	6.6	32	24	77.1	15	1	0.1	1	22	141	9	6

=== College ===
Year	Team	GP	Passing								Rushing			
Year	Team	GP	Cmp	Att	Pct	Yds	Y/A	TD	Int	Rtg	Att	Yds	Avg	TD
1979	Pittsburgh	12	130	222	58.6	1,680	7.5	10	9	128.9	35	−85	−2.4	1
1980	Pittsburgh	12	116	224	51.8	1,609	7.2	15	14	121.7	14	−53	−3.8	0
1981	Pittsburgh	12	226	380	59.5	2,876	7.6	37	23	143.1	24	−95	−4.0	2
1982	Pittsburgh	12	221	378	58.5	2,432	6.4	17	23	115.2	44	−44	−1.0	0
Career		48	693	1,204	57.6	8,597	7.1	79	69	127.7	117	-277	-2.4	3

== Career highlights ==
=== Awards and honors ===
- NFL Most Valuable Player (1984)
- NFL Offensive Player of the Year (1984)
- AFC champion (1984)
- NFL Comeback Player of the Year (1994)
- NFL Man of the Year (1998)
- The Sporting News NFL Rookie of the Year (1983)
- 3x First-team All-Pro (1984–1986)
- 5× Second-team All-Pro (1983, 1988, 1992 1994, 1995)
- 9× Pro Bowl (1983–1987, 1991, 1992, 1994, 1995)
- 5× NFL passing yards leader (1984–1986, 1988, 1992)
- 3× NFL passing touchdowns leader (1984–1986)
- NFL passer rating leader (1984)
- NFL 100th Anniversary All-Time Team
- No. 25 on The Top 100: NFL's Greatest Players
- PFWA All-Rookie Team (1983)
- George Halas Award (1995)
- Miami Dolphins Honor Roll
- Miami Dolphins No. 13 retired
- Dolphins Walk of Fame (2011)
- First-team All-American (1981)
- NCAA passing touchdowns leader (1981)
- First-team All-East (1981)
- Pittsburgh Panthers No. 13 retired
- Won the AFC Offensive Player of the Week honor 18 times in the regular season (20 times overall, including playoffs)

=== NFL records ===
This list documents records set by Marino, some of which have since been tied or broken.

==== Active records ====
- Most seasons leading league, pass attempts: 5 (1984, 1986, 1988, 1992, 1997)
- Most seasons leading league, lowest sack percentage: 10 (1983–1989, 1994, 1997, 1999)
- Most consecutive seasons leading league, lowest sack percentage: 7 (1983–1989)
- Lowest sack percentage, season: 1.0% (1988)
- Monday Night Football, most passing yards: 9,654
- Monday Night Football, most completions: 798
- Monday Night Football, most attempts: 1,303
- Monday Night Football, most touchdown passes: 74

==== Former records ====
- Most consecutive seasons, 3,000 or more yards passing: 9 (1984–1992) (surpassed by Brett Favre in 2009 with 18) (1992–2009)
- Most games, 400 or more yards passing, playoffs: 2 (surpassed by Drew Brees with 3 in 2012 playoffs)
- Most consecutive games, four or more touchdown passes: 4 in 1984 (surpassed by Peyton Manning in 2004)
- Most consecutive home games with a touchdown pass: 39 (1983–1988; surpassed by Tom Brady in 2013)
- Most wins against one team: 24 against the Indianapolis Colts (surpassed by Brett Favre against the Detroit Lions in 2007)
- Most wins in different stadiums: 31 (surpassed by Brett Favre in 2008)
- Most regular season wins, quarterback/head coach: 116 with Don Shula (surpassed by Tom Brady and Bill Belichick in 2011)
- Most straight games, at least 400 yards passing: 2 (surpassed by Ryan Fitzpatrick in 2018)
- Most games, four or more touchdown passes, season: 6 (1984); tied by Peyton Manning in 2004. Surpassed by Patrick Mahomes in 2018 (8)
- Most seasons, 40 or more touchdown passes: 2 (1984, 1986); (surpassed by Aaron Rodgers in 2020)
- 200 touchdown passes in fewest games to start career: 89 (September 17, 1989, at New England) (Surpassed by Patrick Mahomes in 2023)

==== NFL records tied ====
- Most games, 400 or more yards passing, season: 4 in 1984; tied by Peyton Manning in 2013 and Ryan Fitzpatrick in 2018
- Most seasons leading league, yards gained: 5 (1984–1986, 1988, 1992); tied with Sonny Jurgensen (Philadelphia, 1961–1962; Washington, 1966–1967, 1969)
- Most consecutive seasons leading league, completions: 3 (1984–1986); tied with George Blanda (Houston, 1963–1965)
- Most seasons leading league, completions: 6 (1984–1986, 1988, 1992, 1997); tied by Drew Brees (2007, 2008, 2011, 2014, 2016, 2017)
- Monday Night Football, most wins as a starter: 20; tied by Tom Brady

=== Other notable accomplishments ===
- 5th most consecutive games of throwing at least one touchdown pass: 30
- Most games with 300+ passing yards and three touchdowns in first ten seasons (26 games)
- Started 240 of 242 career games
- Compiled a 147–93 regular-season record as a starter (147 wins rank fifth-most all-time)
- First quarterback in NFL history to have six 4,000-yard seasons (1984–1986, 1988, 1992, 1994)
- First quarterback in NFL history to pass for 5,000 yards or more in a single season (5,084 in 1984)
- Holds Dolphins team record for most seasons played (17)

== Life after football ==
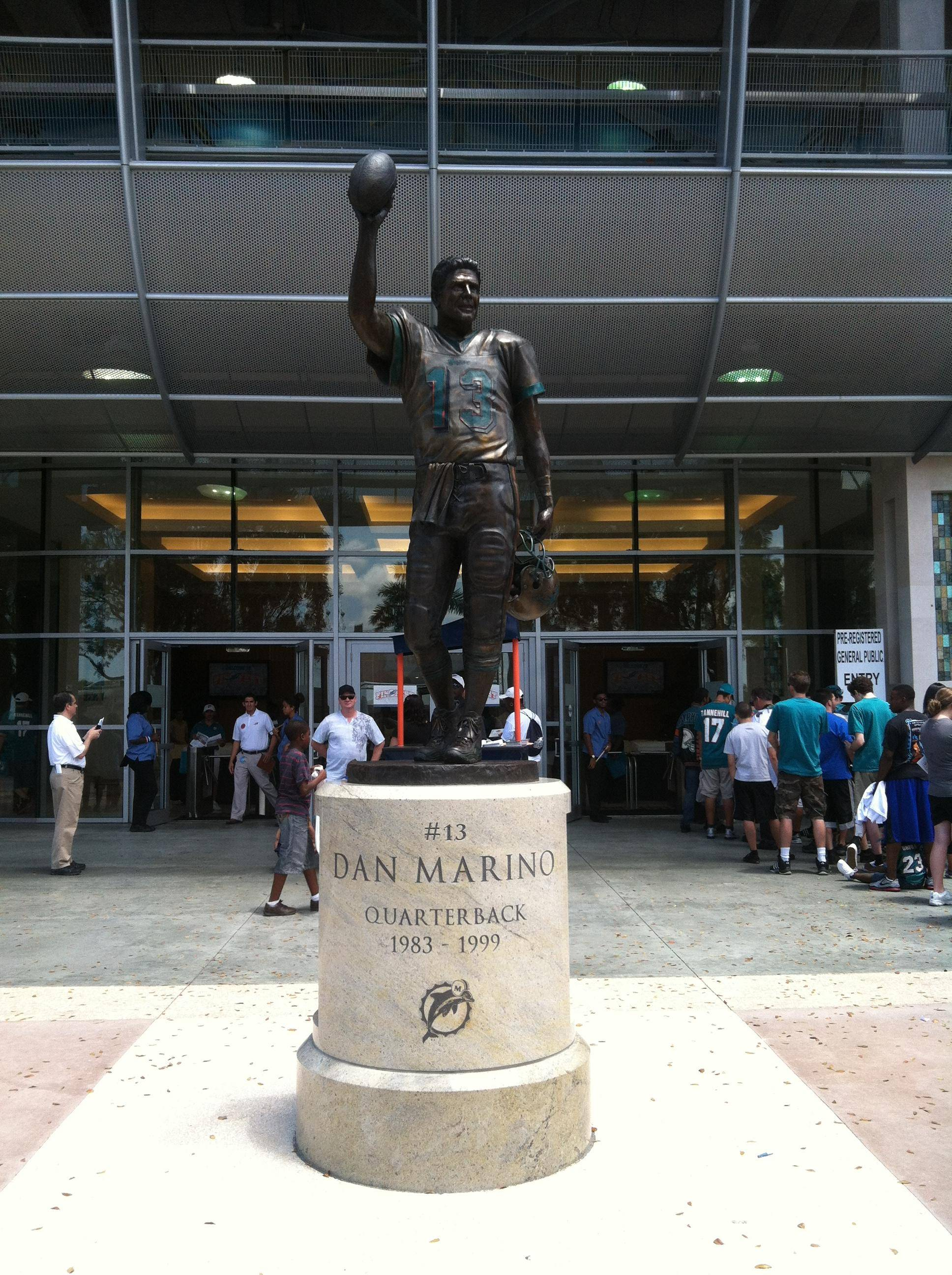
A life sized bronzed statue of Marino outside of Hard Rock Stadium.

On Sunday, September 17, 2000, at halftime of the Dolphins-Baltimore Ravens game at Pro Player Stadium, Dan Marino's jersey number of 13 was retired. The only other Dolphins jersey number retired at the time was Bob Griese's #12. Since then #39, Larry Csonka, has been retired as well. Marino joined the Dolphins Honor Roll the same day. In a year of accolades from the franchise he led for many years, the Dolphins also installed a life-size bronze statue of Marino at Pro Player Stadium (now Hard Rock Stadium) and renamed Stadium Street to Dan Marino Boulevard.

In 2003, Marino was honored for his outstanding NCAA career at Pitt with an induction into the College Football Hall of Fame. In early 2004, Marino briefly returned to the Miami Dolphins as Senior Vice President of Football Operations but resigned from the newly created position only three weeks later, saying the role was not in the best interest of either his family or the Dolphin organization. Marino was elected to the Pro Football Hall of Fame in 2005, one of only five Dolphins to be elected in their first year of eligibility (Paul Warfield, Jim Langer, Don Shula and Jason Taylor). He was inducted into the Hall of Fame on August 7, 2005 and was introduced by his oldest son, Daniel. During his induction speech, Dan threw "one last pass" to former teammate Mark Clayton, who was sitting in the audience. Marino served as an analyst for CBS's Sunday pregame show The NFL Today from 2002 to 2013. On February 18, 2014, it was announced that Marino, along with Shannon Sharpe were being relieved of their duties as on-air commentators on The NFL Today and were being replaced by Tony Gonzalez and Bart Scott. He was formerly a studio analyst on HBO's Inside the NFL, from 2002 to 2007.

Marino served as an analyst for CBS's Sunday pregame show The NFL Today from 2002 to 2013. On February 18, 2014, it was announced that Marino, along with Shannon Sharpe were being relieved of their duties as on-air commentators on The NFL Today and were being replaced by Tony Gonzalez and Bart Scott. He was formerly a studio analyst on HBO's Inside the NFL, from 2002 to 2007.

On August 24, 2014, Marino announced he would return to the Dolphins as a special adviser.

Former Miami Dolphins quarterback Tua Tagovailoa revealed that Marino regularly attends Dolphins quarterback meetings to give his opinion and input on how to be a better quarterback.

== Life outside football ==
=== Ownership in NASCAR ===
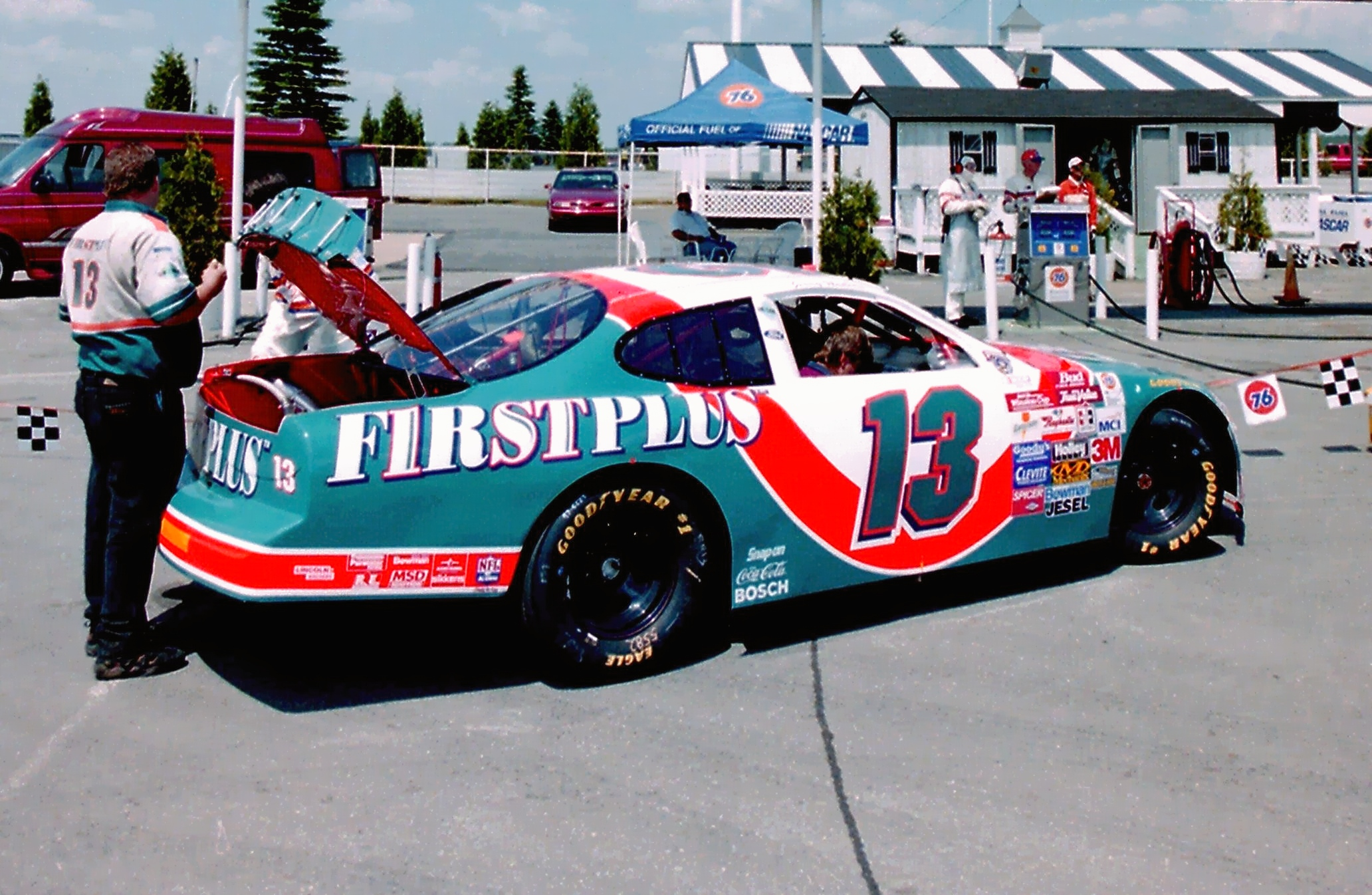
Marino's #13 NASCAR racecar

In 1997, Marino became involved in a marketing role with Team Cheever of the Indy Racing League through FirstPlus Mortgage, the sponsor of the car. In 1998, Marino co-owned a NASCAR Winston Cup Series racing team with driver Bill Elliott, creating Elliott-Marino Motorsports. The team's car number was #13, Marino's uniform number, and had primary sponsorship from FirstPlus Mortgage, whose company colors, coincidentally, were turquoise, orange, and white – similar to aqua and coral, the team colors of the Miami Dolphins. The team chose rookie driver Jerry Nadeau to pilot the car at the start of the season; he was later released and the team went through a rotation of drivers. The team failed to qualify for several races, but did post a top-5 finish at Phoenix International Raceway late in the season with Ted Musgrave driving. The team only lasted the 1998 season and closed afterward.

=== Dan Marino Foundation ===
The Dan Marino Foundation was established in 1992 by Marino and his wife, Claire, after their son, Michael, was diagnosed with autism. The foundation has distributed over $22 million to research, services, and treatment programs serving children with neurodevelopment disabilities. The Dan Marino Center, which opened in 1995 along with the Miami Children's Hospital, is an integrated neurodevelopmental center specializing in the diagnosis and treatment of children at risk for developmental and psychological problems. The center saw more than 48,000 children last year alone. Marino has teamed with other celebrities to raise awareness about autistic spectrum disorders, including fellow NFL quarterback Doug Flutie, whose son also has an autism diagnosis.

On November 7, 2005, the National Basketball Association's Miami Heat honored Marino's charitable works and recognized his service to South Florida with a halftime tribute, as well as a large donation to the Marino Foundation. Though a Heat jersey with his name and #13 was unveiled, this did not constitute retirement of his number by the Heat, and is currently worn by Heat big man Bam Adebayo.

On March 23, 2010, The Dan Marino Foundation held its first "Walk about Autism". Over 6000 walkers participated, as well as 420 volunteers provided by the Miami Dolphins Special Teams.

The money raised benefited several funds including the Autism Societies of Miami-Dade and Broward; the University of Miami-Nova Southeastern University Center for Autism and Related Disabilities; the Florida Atlantic University Center for Autism and Related Disabilities; and the Dan Marino Foundation.

=== In popular culture ===
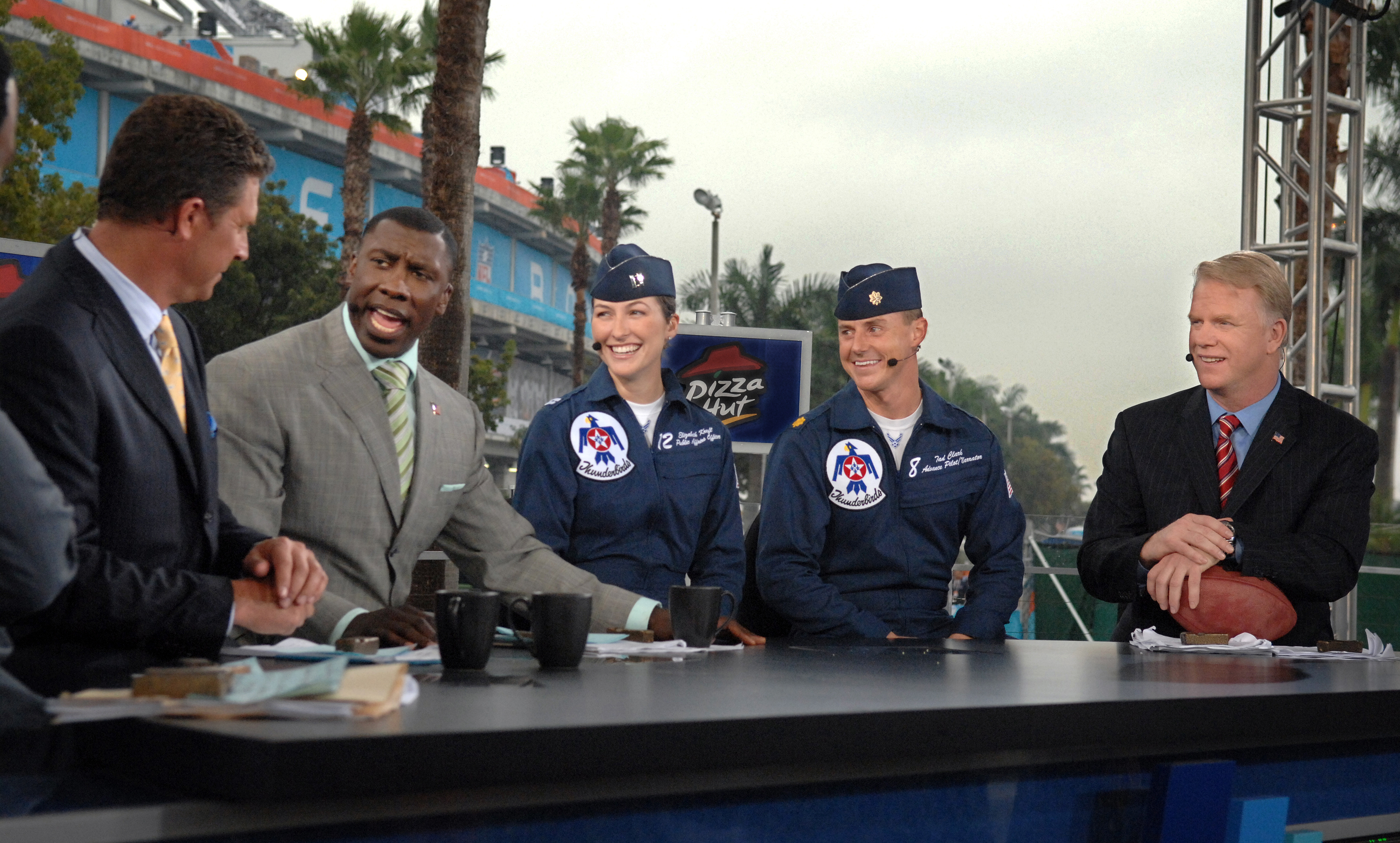
Marino with Shannon Sharpe, two United States Air Force members, and Boomer Esiason during the Super Bowl XLI pre-game show in Miami

Marino acted in the 1994 comedy Ace Ventura: Pet Detective alongside Jim Carrey and Courteney Cox where he played himself. Marino made a cameo appearance in the Adam Sandler film Little Nicky wherein he asked Satan for a Super Bowl ring. In 1999, he voiced himself in a guest-starring role in The Simpsons Season ten episode "Sunday, Cruddy Sunday". Marino also had cameo roles in Holy Man and Bad Boys II. He worked as a project consultant on Oliver Stone's Any Given Sunday, and some observers noticed a resemblance between him and Dennis Quaid's character, Jack Rooney. Marino's actual house was used as the fictional quarterback's house in the film.

In 1995, Hootie and the Blowfish featured Marino in their music video for their single "Only Wanna Be with You".

Musician MJ Lenderman has a song titled "Dan Marino" on his 2022 album Boat Songs.

Marino was featured in advertisement campaigns for Hooters, NutriSystem weight loss programs, Maroone, Papa John's, Nutrasource.com, and Empi Select (a TENS device). Previously, Marino endorsed Isotoner gloves and FirstPlus Mortgage against whom he later filed suit due to contracts related to his racing team.

In April 2012, Marino became the AARP's "Men's Life Ambassador", through which he planned to share his point of view and expertise on a variety of men's interests, including health, fitness, sports, lifestyle, entrepreneurship, aging, and community service, primarily through the website.

=== Cancelled video game ===
Marino was the cover athlete on Front Page Sports: Football Pro '98. A video game featuring Marino's likeness and sponsorship, similar to John Madden Football, was announced for the Sega Genesis at CES 1993. The game, referred to as both Dan Marino Football and Dan Marino's Touchdown Football, never released. A prototype was recovered by the Video Game History Foundation and released on December 15, 2025, along with many Sega Channel materials.

== Personal life ==
In 1985, Marino married Claire D. Veazey (born c. 1962) of Mt. Lebanon, Pennsylvania, at St. Regis Catholic Church, across the street from the home of Marino's parents. The couple have six children together.

Through his sister Cindi, Marino is brother-in-law to longtime KDKA radio personality Larry Richert, who currently serves as the announcer for the Pittsburgh Steelers at Acrisure Stadium in addition to his radio duties and was once a meteorologist for KDKA-TV when the radio & TV stations were both owned by Group W. Along with former WDVE personality Jim Krenn, Marino and Richert co-own Yinzer Dogs, a hot dog stand that started off as a food truck before opening a permanent location in suburban Cranberry Township with plans to open a second location in the Strip District before the 2026 NFL draft scheduled to take place in Pittsburgh.

Marino was awarded an honorary doctorate degree in broadcast journalism by his alma mater, the University of Pittsburgh, in 2005. He delivered the commencement speech at the university's 2008 graduation ceremony.

In January 2013, Marino admitted to fathering a child with CBS employee Donna Savattere in 2005, a fact he only shared with his wife. He previously paid Savattere several million dollars to keep the news of their daughter from the public.

== See also ==
- List of 500-yard passing games in the National Football League
- List of NFL quarterbacks who have posted a perfect passer rating
- List of gridiron football quarterbacks passing statistics
- Most consecutive starts by a quarterback (NFL)
- List of NCAA major college football yearly passing leaders
- List of celebrities who own wineries and vineyards
