= Tom Heckert =

Tom Heckert may refer to:

- Tom Heckert Sr. (born 1938), American football coach and executive, head coach at Adrian College (1974–1981)
- Tom Heckert Jr. (1967–2018), American football coach and executive, most recently general manager of the Cleveland Browns until 2012, son of the former
