= Kirk Olivadotti =

American football player and coach (born 1974)

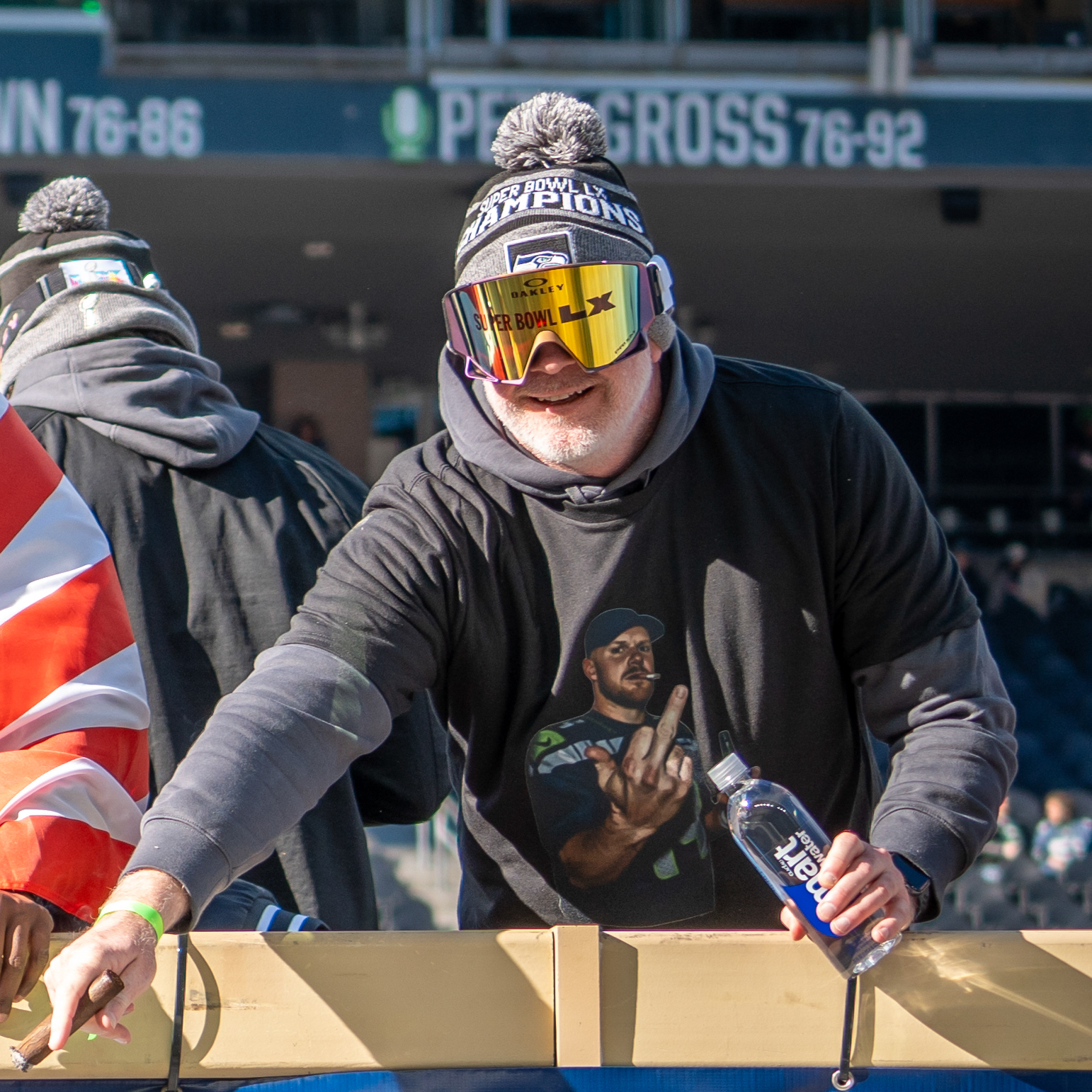
- Olivadotti at the Super Bowl LX parade in 2026

Personal information
- Born: January 1, 1974 (age 52); Wilmington, Delaware, U.S.

Career information
- Position: Wide receiver
- High school: St. Thomas Aquinas (Fort Lauderdale, Florida)
- College: Purdue (1993–1996)
- NFL draft: 1997: undrafted

Career history
- Maine Maritime (1997) Wide receivers coach; Indiana State (1998–1999) Assistant coach; Washington Redskins (2000–2010); Defensive quality control coach & assistant defensive backs coach (2000–2003); Defensive quality control coach & special teams assistant (2004–2005); Special teams assistant & defensive line assistant (2006); Linebackers coach (2007–2009); Defensive assistant (2010); Georgia (2011–2013) Linebackers coach; Washington Redskins (2014–2018) Linebackers coach; Green Bay Packers (2019–2023) Inside linebackers coach; Seattle Seahawks (2024–present); Inside linebackers coach (2024–2025); Senior defensive assistant (2026–present)

Awards and highlights
- Super Bowl champion (LX)

Kirk Olivadotti (born January 1, 1974) is an American professional football coach who is a senior defensive assistant for the Seattle Seahawks of the National Football League (NFL).

== Early life ==
Kirk Olivadotti was born in Wilmington, Delaware, to Karen and Tom Olivadotti. Now retired, Tom spent 40 years coaching football at the high school, college, and professional levels, the latter consisting of 21 years as a defensive coach for NFL teams such as the Cleveland Browns (1985–1986), the Miami Dolphins (1987–1995), the Minnesota Vikings (1996–1999), the New York Giants (2000–2003), and the Houston Texans (2004–2005).

Kirk attended St. Thomas Aquinas High School in Fort Lauderdale, Florida from 1988 to 1992, where he played wide receiver on the school's football team. He then went on to Purdue University where he received a Bachelor's degree in Education, followed by a Master's degree in Education Administration. While at Purdue, Olivadotti played as wide receiver and was a four-year letter winner from 1993 to 1996.

== Coaching ==
Olivadotti began his coaching career at the college level, working with the Maine Maritime Academy's wide receivers and tight ends in 1997. He then spent two seasons (1998–1999) working as an assistant coach at Indiana State University.

In 2000, Olivadotti began coaching the Washington Redskins' defense. His time with the team would last for eleven seasons, making him the longest-tenured coach on the Redskins' staff at the time of his leave. He worked in various positions, including defensive backs assistant (2000–2003), defensive quality control (2000–2003; 2004–2005), special teams assistant (2004–2006), defensive line (2006), linebackers coach (2007–2009), and defensive assistant (2010). While working as a linebackers coach, Olivadotti tutored two linebackers, London Fletcher and Brian Orakpo, to their first Pro Bowl, the all-star game of the National Football League.

In February 2011, Olivadotti was hired by University of Georgia coach Mark Richt to be the Bulldogs' new linebackers coach. He filled the spot vacated by Warren Belin when he left for the Carolina Panthers. Olivadotti's father, Tom, had previously coached with University of Georgia defensive coordinator Todd Grantham for the Houston Texans. On January 16, 2014, it was announced that Olivadotti had rejoined the Redskins on new head coach Jay Gruden's staff as his linebackers coach.

On January 24, 2019, Olivadotti was hired as the inside linebackers coach of the Green Bay Packers.

On February 5, 2024, Olivadotti was hired as the linebackers coach of the Seattle Seahawks. He reunited with head coach Mike Macdonald, with whom he worked with on the Georgia Bulldogs from 2011 to 2013 as their linebackers coach. He was part of the coaching staff that won Super Bowl LX over the New England Patriots 29–13. On March 12, 2026, the Seahawks announced Olivadotti had been promoted to a senior defensive assistant role.

== Personal life ==
Olivadotti married Keely Carter from West Lafayette, Indiana in February 2001. They have two children.

The family lived in Ashburn, Virginia while Olivadotti coached the Washington Redskins, However, during his appointment to the Georgia Bulldogs, Olivadotti and his family moved to Athens, Georgia.
