= Sammie Smith =

American football player (born 1967)

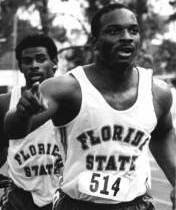
- Smith running track at Florida State in 1988

No. 32, 33
- Position: Running back

Personal information
- Born: May 16, 1967 (age 59); Orlando, Florida, U.S.
- Listed height: 6 ft 2 in (1.88 m)
- Listed weight: 226 lb (103 kg)

Career information
- High school: Apopka (Apopka, Florida)
- College: Florida State
- NFL draft: 1989: 1st round, 9th overall pick

Career history
- Miami Dolphins (1989–1991); Denver Broncos (1992)

Career NFL statistics
- Rushing yards: 1,881
- Rushing average: 3.5
- Total touchdowns: 16
- Stats at Pro Football Reference

Sammie Lee Smith (born May 16, 1967) is an American former professional football player who was a running back in the National Football League (NFL). He played college football for the Florida State Seminoles and was selected by the Miami Dolphins in the first round of the 1989 NFL draft with the ninth overall pick. Smith played in four NFL seasons from 1989 to 1992 for the Dolphins and Denver Broncos. Smith had some success as the starter for Miami in 1989 and 1990, but his fumbling issues cost Miami repeatedly in 1991, leading to him being benched late in the season. Miami traded Smith away to Denver for Bobby Humphrey before the 1992 season, and Smith saw very limited action in a few games that year. Denver released him as soon as their season was over and Smith retired after no teams showed any interest in signing him for the 1993 season or beyond.

Smith has had numerous legal problems since leaving professional football. In 1996, he was convicted of two counts of possession and distribution of cocaine, and spent seven years in prison as a result. He won restoration of his civil rights from the State of Florida in June 2010.

In 2013, he was inducted into the Florida State Athletics Hall of Fame.

== NFL career statistics ==
Legend
**Bold**	Career high

=== Regular season ===
Year	Team	Games		Rushing					Receiving				
Year	Team	GP	GS	Att	Yds	Avg	Lng	TD	Rec	Yds	Avg	Lng	TD
1989	MIA	13	12	200	659	3.3	25	6	7	81	11.6	34	0
1990	MIA	**16**	**16**	**226**	**831**	3.7	**33**	**8**	11	**134**	**12.2**	**53**	**1**
1991	MIA	12	6	83	297	3.6	18	1	**14**	95	6.8	12	0
1992	DEN	3	1	23	94	**4.1**	15	0	0	0	0.0	0	0
		44	35	532	1,881	3.5	33	15	32	310	9.7	53	1

=== Playoffs ===
Year	Team	Games		Rushing					Receiving				
Year	Team	GP	GS	Att	Yds	Avg	Lng	TD	Rec	Yds	Avg	Lng	TD
1990	MIA	2	2	41	181	4.4	17	0	3	31	10.3	13	0
		2	2	41	181	4.4	17	0	3	31	10.3	13	0
