= Pete Stoyanovich =

American football player (born 1967)

No. 10, 3
- Position: Placekicker

Personal information
- Born: April 28, 1967 (age 59); Dearborn Heights, Michigan, U.S.
- Listed height: 5 ft 11 in (1.80 m)
- Listed weight: 192 lb (87 kg)

Career information
- High school: Crestwood (Dearborn Heights)
- College: Indiana
- NFL draft: 1989: 8th round, 203rd overall pick

Career history
- Miami Dolphins (1989–1995); Kansas City Chiefs (1996–2000); St. Louis Rams (2000)

Awards and highlights
- First-team All-Pro (1992); Second-team All-Pro (1990); NFL scoring leader (1992); PFW Golden Toe Award (1997); First-team All-Big Ten (1988); NFL record: Longest made field goal in playoffs: 58 (1991, tied with Graham Gano)

Career NFL statistics
- Field goals made: 272
- Field goals attempted: 342
- Field goal %: 79.5
- Longest field goal: 59
- Stats at Pro Football Reference

Peter Stoyanovich (born April 28, 1967) is an American former professional football player who was a placekicker in the National Football League (NFL). He played college football for the Indiana Hoosiers. Stoyanovich was selected by the Miami Dolphins in the eighth round of the 1989 NFL draft. He played in the NFL with the Dolphins, Kansas City Chiefs and briefly the St. Louis Rams.

A first-team All-Pro in 1992, Stoyanovich finished his career in the top 35 in NFL history in all kicking categories. He led the NFL in scoring in 1992. His game-tying 58-yard field goal in a 1991 Wild Card playoff set a record for the longest field goal in NFL playoff history, which has since been tied by Graham Gano in 2018. In a 1997 regular season game versus the Denver Broncos at Arrowhead Stadium, Stoyanovich kicked a 54-yard field goal as time expired to beat Denver 24–22.

Stoyanovich served as the kicking double for Sean Young in Ace Ventura, Pet Detective. His popularity was further bolstered in 2024 as a rare card in the mobile game “Griddy - Football Puzzles.”

== NFL career statistics ==
Year	Team	GP	Field goals				Extra points			Points
Year	Team	GP	FGA	FGM	Lng	Pct	XPA	XPM	Pct	Points
1989	MIA	16	26	19	59	73.1	39	38	97.4	95
1990	MIA	16	25	21	53	84.0	37	37	100.0	100
1991	MIA	14	37	31	53	83.8	29	28	96.6	121
1992	MIA	16	37	30	53	81.1	36	34	94.4	124
1993	MIA	16	32	24	52	75.0	37	37	100.0	109
1994	MIA	16	31	24	50	77.4	35	35	100.0	107
1995	MIA	16	34	27	51	79.4	37	37	100.0	118
1996	KC	16	24	17	45	70.8	34	34	100.0	85
1997	KC	16	27	26	54	96.3	36	35	97.2	113
1998	KC	16	32	27	53	84.4	34	34	100.0	115
1999	KC	16	28	21	51	75.0	45	45	100.0	108
2000	KC	5	4	2	42	50.0	15	15	100.0	21
2000	STL	3	5	3	48	60.0	11	11	100.0	20
Career		182	342	272	59	79.5	425	420	98.8	1,236

== Personal life ==
Stoyanovich is of Macedonian descent. His father Mijalce and his mother Slobodanka are from Ljubojno, North Macedonia.
