= African Grant =

American football player (born 1965)

No. 41, 29
- Position: Defensive back

Personal information
- Born: August 2, 1965 (age 61); New York City, U.S.
- Listed height: 6 ft 0 in (1.83 m)
- Listed weight: 200 lb (91 kg)

Career information
- High school: Dwight Morrow (Englewood, New Jersey)
- College: Illinois (1983–1987)

Career history
- Washington Redskins (1988)*; Miami Dolphins (1989–1990); Ohio Glory (1992); Indianapolis Colts (1992)*
- * Offseason or practice squad member only

Career NFL statistics
- Games played: 4
- Stats at Pro Football Reference

African Nigeria Grant (born August 2, 1965) is an American former professional football player who was a defensive back for one season in the National Football League (NFL) with the Miami Dolphins. From New York City, he played college football for the Illinois Fighting Illini and led the team in interceptions in 1986. After going unselected in the 1988 NFL draft, he signed with the Washington Redskins but did not make the team. He later joined the Dolphins and appeared in four games for them during the 1990 season. Grant was also a member of the Ohio Glory of the World League of American Football (WLAF) and the Indianapolis Colts in the NFL.

== Early life ==
African Nigeria Grant was born on August 2, 1965, in New York City. His father, Emory, an activist, wanted his name to be memorable and one "that would carry on the significance" of the civil rights movement. Grant's father died when he was six years old. He grew up in New York City, where he said he was often bullied for his name. He said, "I took a lot of heat growing up. But once I understood why my dad did it, it didn't really bother me that much. I learned how to handle it."

Grant attended Dwight Morrow High School in Englewood, New Jersey, where he played football and baseball. He entered Morrow with experience as a running back and linebacker, but switched positions in his freshman year to quarterback. He became starting quarterback as a sophomore and also started at safety on defense. As a senior, he led the team to a record of 8–1 and was named first-team All-Bergen. That year, he threw for 520 yards and ran for 986 yards and 11 touchdowns. After high school, he signed to play college football for the Illinois Fighting Illini.

== College career ==
Grant redshirted as a freshman at Illinois in 1983. He entered the 1984 season as a backup safety behind Craig Swoope. Against Northwestern at the start of the season, he came in for Swoope and made an interception when the Fighting Illini were losing by a score of 16–7. His interception began a turnaround by Illinois and they won the game 24–16. However, a hit on Grant by a Northwestern lineman in the game resulted in a knee injury that required surgery and ended his season. In 1985, he won a starting role at right cornerback and posted two interceptions for the Fighting Illini, helping them qualify for the 1985 Peach Bowl.

In early 1986, Grant faced academic issues that led to a suspension from the football team. He only became eligible again at the start of the season, having been absent from the team during the entire preseason camp. He was made a third-string on the depth chart upon his return, saying that, "Because of all the time I missed, when I came back, I was out of shape and didn't really have all the techniques down." After spending the first four weeks as a backup, Grant was promoted to starter for the team's game against Purdue and helped them win 34–27 by posting two interceptions. He was named the team's defensive player of the week for his performance. His two interceptions against Purdue allowed him to finish the season as the team's leader in interceptions.

Grant missed the majority of his senior year due to a shoulder injury suffered prior to the season. He said his arm felt "dead" due to the injury and later noted, "Obviously there was some nerve damage they couldn't find or pick up or anything. They put the camera in my shoulder and they couldn't find anything." He only played in the final three games of the season.

== Professional career ==
Grant went unselected in the 1988 NFL draft. He attended minicamp with the Tampa Bay Buccaneers and later signed with the Washington Redskins, but was released on August 24, 1988, during preseason. He then moved back to New Jersey, but continued working out. In March 1989, he signed with the Miami Dolphins and impressed in training camp. He recorded the team's lone interception in preseason and made the final roster, but was placed on injured reserve due to a broken thumb suffered in preseason. The next year, he was released on September 3, 1990, in what Don Shula said was the most difficult cut. Grant was re-signed on September 14, following an injury to Mike McGruder. He appeared in four games as a backup safety before suffering a torn ACL against the New York Jets, ending his season. His recovery was slow and he was released by the Dolphins on August 20, 1991.

In April 1992, Grant signed with the Ohio Glory of the newly-formed World League of American Football (WLAF). After posting two interceptions for the Glory during the 1992 WLAF season, in which they compiled a record of 1–9, he returned to the NFL and signed with the Indianapolis Colts that July. He was released in August, finishing his NFL career with four games played.

== Personal life ==
Grant and his wife, Stacey, moved to Ohio after his football career. They have three children. He coached junior varsity volleyball and has a daughter, Nia, who played volleyball in college for the Penn State Nittany Lions.
