= Rodney Thomas (defensive back) =

American football player (born 1965)

No. 21, 24, 45
- Position: Defensive back

Personal information
- Born: December 21, 1965 (age 60); Los Angeles, California, U.S.
- Listed height: 5 ft 10 in (1.78 m)
- Listed weight: 190 lb (86 kg)

Career information
- High school: Chaffey (Ontario, California)
- College: BYU
- NFL draft: 1988: 5th round, 126th overall pick

Career history
- Miami Dolphins (1988–1990); Los Angeles Rams (1991); San Francisco 49ers (1992)*
- * Offseason or practice squad member only

Awards and highlights
- First team all-WAC (1986)

Career NFL statistics
- Games played: 46
- Interceptions: 3
- Fumbles recovered: 3
- Stats at Pro Football Reference

Rodney Lamar Thomas (born December 21, 1965) is an American former professional football player who was a defensive back for 46 games in the National Football League from 1988 to 1991. Thomas spent three seasons with the Miami Dolphins and one with the Los Angeles Rams. He played college football for the BYU Cougars.

== Early life and college ==
Thomas was born in Los Angeles and played high school football at Chaffey High School in Ontario, California. He attended college at Brigham Young University, where he started for the football team as a sophomore; he was the only sophomore starter on the 1985 team. Thomas was named to the all-Western Athletic Conference first team in his junior year. In his senior season, Thomas injured his ankle in a game against TCU, causing him to miss multiple games. He returned an interception for a touchdown in the final regular-season game against rival Utah. Thomas was named to the all-WAC second team following the 1987 season.

== Professional career ==
Thomas was selected by the Miami Dolphins in the fifth round of the 1988 NFL draft. He struggled in his first year in the NFL; he played in twelve games and started in one, but he was replaced in his sole start after a poor performance. In the 1989 season, the Dolphins used Thomas as a dimeback alongside Don McNeal. Thomas became a free agent after the 1990 season and signed with the Los Angeles Rams, where he played in three games.
