= Andre Brown (wide receiver) =

American football player (born 1966)

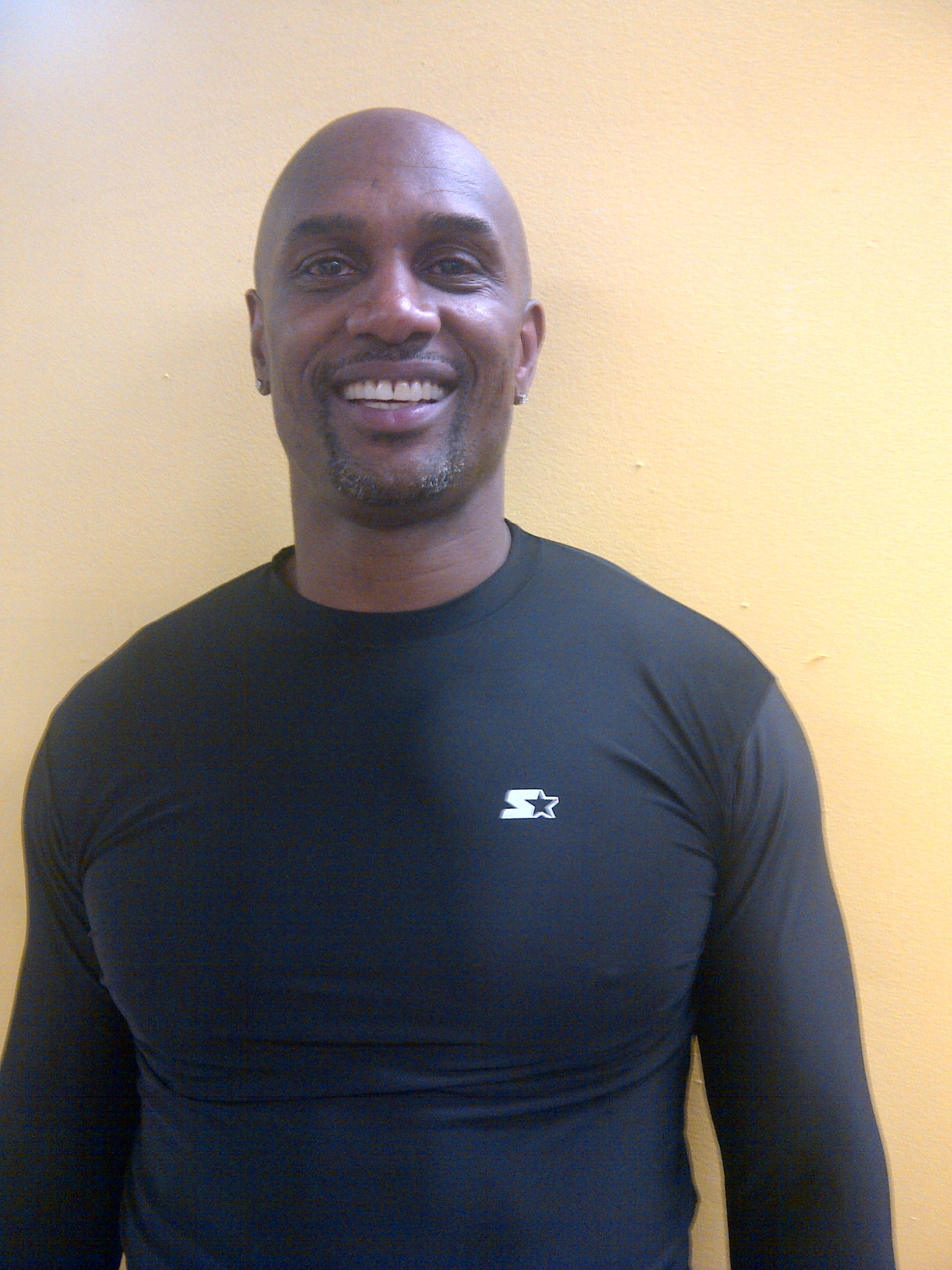
- Brown in January 2013

No. 82, 85, 5
- Position: Wide receiver

Personal information
- Born: August 21, 1966 (age 60); Chicago, Illinois, U.S.
- Listed height: 6 ft 3 in (1.91 m)
- Listed weight: 210 lb (95 kg)

Career information
- High school: Fenger (Chicago)
- College: Miami (FL)
- NFL draft: 1989: undrafted

Career history
- Miami Dolphins (1989–1990); Montreal Machine (1992); Ottawa Rough Riders (1993); Toronto Argonauts (1993)

Awards and highlights
- National champion (1987); First Team All-South Independent (1988)

Career NFL statistics
- Receptions: 27
- Receiving yards: 459
- Touchdowns: 5
- Stats at Pro Football Reference

Andre Lamont Brown (born August 21, 1966) is an American former professional football player who was a wide receiver in the National Football League (NFL) and Canadian Football League (CFL). He was signed by the Miami Dolphins as an undrafted free agent in 1989. He played college football for the Miami Hurricanes. In 1988, he recorded 47 catches for 746 yards and 8 touchdowns.
