= Bryan Wiedmeier =

American lawyer, NFL executive

- Born: October 19, 1959
- Died: June 7, 2016 (aged 56)
- Education: University of Miami School of Law
- Occupations: lawyer, NFL executive
- Known for: football executive
- Notable work: Miami Dolphins, Cleveland Browns
- Spouse: Mary K.
- Children: 5

Bryan Jon Wiedmeier (October 19, 1959 – June 7, 2016) was an American National Football League executive. He spent five seasons with the Cleveland Browns after joining their organization as executive vice president-business operations on January 11, 2010. In 2013, he adopted a new role, working closely with CEO Joe Banner focusing on long-term strategic planning for the organization, including stadium projects and other capital endeavors.

== Beginnings with the Dolphins ==
Wiedmeier joined the Browns following a successful 29-year tenure with the Miami Dolphins. He was hired by Dolphins founder Joe Robbie in 1981 and was promoted to assistant general manager by Robbie in 1989. He served in key roles and ascending executive capacities for the Dolphins with responsibilities including business operations and football administration. He was named president and COO by owner H. Wayne Huizenga in January 2006.

During Wiedmeier's time with the Dolphins (1981–2009), the team ranked fourth in the NFL in wins with a 260–195–1 regular-season record, and appeared in 27 postseason games. This run was highlighted by eight division titles, four AFC Championship games and a pair of Super Bowl appearances.

Off the field, the Dolphins enjoyed equal success. The club produced franchise highs for consecutive sellouts and total attendance, and built both a new stadium and training facility. South Florida was also awarded five Super Bowls and a Pro Bowl by the NFL during this period. The Dolphins were leaders in the league's international initiatives with six appearances in five countries, including the inaugural regular-season games in London and Toronto.

== Cleveland Browns ==
On January 11, 2010, the Cleveland Browns named Wiedmeier Executive Vice President - Business Operations.

== NFL ==
Wiedmeier was active in league affairs for 35 years as a club representative in National Football League matters and serving on NFL committees and working groups. He is an original member of the NFL Management Council’s Working Club Executive Committee and NFL Player Insurance Trust.

In his NFL career, Wiedmeier had the opportunity to work closely with five of the top football leaders of the era, including two members of the Pro Football Hall of Fame. This group includes the winningest coach in NFL history, Don Shula as well as Jimmy Johnson, Nick Saban, Bill Parcells and Mike Holmgren.

== Education ==
Wiedmeier earned his J.D. from the University of Miami School of Law and was a member of the Florida Bar. He was a three-year starting center for Carroll College (Montana), where he earned his business degree and served as team captain his senior year. He was a sophomore starter on Carroll's 1978 Hall of Fame team.

== Personal life ==
He and his wife, Mary K., had five children: Lauren, Victoria, John, Danielle and Matthew.

Wiedmeier was diagnosed with Stage 4 brain cancer in October 2012. Despite being given 15 months to live, he survived for nearly four years until he died from cancer on June 7, 2016. He was 56 years old.

Preceded by Eddie Jones	Miami Dolphins President; 2006-2009	Succeeded by position abolished
