= Scott Miller (wide receiver, born 1968) =

American football player (born 1968)

No. 82, 83
- Position: Wide receiver

Personal information
- Born: October 20, 1968 (age 58); Phoenix, Arizona, U.S.
- Listed height: 5 ft 10 in (1.78 m)
- Listed weight: 181 lb (82 kg)

Career information
- High school: Lake Forest (CA) El Toro
- College: UCLA
- NFL draft: 1991: 9th round, 246th overall pick

Career history
- Miami Dolphins (1991–1996)

Awards and highlights
- Second-team All-Pac-10 (1990)

Career NFL statistics
- Receptions: 24
- Receiving yards: 274
- Touchdowns: 1
- Stats at Pro Football Reference

Scott Patrick Miller (born October 20, 1968) is an American former professional football player who was a wide receiver for six seasons with the Miami Dolphins of the National Football League (NFL). He played college football for the UCLA Bruins. He was selected by the Dolphins in the ninth round of the 1991 NFL draft.

Pre-draft measurables
| Height | Weight | Arm length | Hand span | 40-yard dash | 10-yard split | 20-yard split | 20-yard shuttle | Vertical jump |
|---|---|---|---|---|---|---|---|---|
| 5 ft 10 in (1.78 m) | 179 lb (81 kg) | 30 1/2 in (0.77 m) | 9 1/8 in (0.23 m) | 4.62 s | 1.66 s | 2.72 s | 4.33 s | 31.5 in (0.80 m) |
