= Chuck Klingbeil =

American gridiron football player (1965–2018)

No. 99
- Position: Defensive tackle

Personal information
- Born: November 2, 1965; Houghton, Michigan, U.S.
- Died: June 19, 2018 (aged 52); Chicago, Illinois, U.S.
- Listed height: 6 ft 1 in (1.85 m)
- Listed weight: 288 lb (131 kg)

Career information
- High school: Houghton (MI)
- College: Northern Michigan
- NFL draft: 1989: undrafted

Career history

Playing
- Saskatchewan Roughriders (1989–1990); Miami Dolphins (1991–1995)

Coaching
- Michigan Tech (1999–2002) (asst. coach); Michigan Tech (2010–2013) (DB/DL/S&C asst. coach); Finlandia (2016) (DL asst. coach)

Awards and highlights
- Grey Cup champion (1989); Grey Cup MVP (1989)

Career NFL statistics
- Tackles: 268
- Sacks: 7.5
- Fumble recoveries: 1
- Stats at Pro Football Reference

Charles E. Klingbeil (November 2, 1965 – June 19, 2018) was an American professional football defensive tackle in the National Football League (NFL) and Canadian Football League (CFL). He was signed by the Saskatchewan Roughriders as an undrafted free agent in 1989. He played college football at Northern Michigan.

Klingbeil was a member of the Roughriders team that won the 1989 Grey Cup, and he was named the defensive MVP of the game.

In the NFL, Klingbeil played five seasons for the Miami Dolphins. He scored the game-winning touchdown in coach Don Shula's 300th win, recovering a fourth-quarter Don Majkowski fumble in the end zone to propel the Dolphins to a 16–13 victory over the Green Bay Packers.

Following his playing career, he worked as an assistant coach at various colleges, but also had several run-ins with the law. In 2008, Klingbeil was charged with larceny. While a coach at Michigan Technological University in 2013, Klingbeil was charged with misdemeanor possession of prescription drugs, to which he pleaded guilty.

He died on June 19, 2018, in Chicago while returning to the Copper Country, Michigan, where he lived.
