= Mike McGruder =

American football player (born 1964)

Profile
- Position: Cornerback

Personal information
- Born: May 6, 1964 (age 62); Cleveland, Ohio, U.S.

Career information
- High school: Cleveland Heights (Cleveland Heights, Ohio)
- College: Kent State

Career history
- 1986–1988: Saskatchewan Roughriders
- 1989: Green Bay Packers
- 1990–1991: Miami Dolphins
- 1992–1993: San Francisco 49ers
- 1994–1995: Tampa Bay Buccaneers
- 1996–1997: New England Patriots
- Stats at Pro Football Reference

Mike "Scooter" McGruder (born May 6, 1964) is an American former professional football player who was a cornerback in the National Football League (NFL) and Canadian Football League (CFL). He played college football for the Kent State Golden Flashes.

Over his 12-year career, Mike played in championship games for the Miami Dolphins, the San Francisco 49ers, and in Super Bowl XXXI with the New England Patriots. During Mike's tenure in San Francisco, he became the team captain and led them in interceptions. He also tied for 3rd in the NFC for most interceptions and was selected as an alternate for the NFL Pro Bowl. In 1998, he announced his retirement.

Mike founded Platinum Charities (PC) in 2010.
