= Chris Green (American football) =

American football player (born 1968)

No. 42
- Position: Defensive back

Personal information
- Born: February 26, 1968 (age 58); Lawrenceburg, Indiana, U.S.
- Listed height: 5 ft 11 in (1.80 m)
- Listed weight: 192 lb (87 kg)

Career information
- High school: Lawrenceburg
- College: Illinois
- NFL draft: 1991: 7th round, 191st overall pick

Career history
- Miami Dolphins (1991–1994); Buffalo Bills (1995)

Awards and highlights
- Second-team All-Big Ten (1989)

Career NFL statistics
- Tackles: 84
- Interceptions: 2
- Stats at Pro Football Reference

Christopher Allen Green (born February 26, 1968) is an American former professional football player who was a defensive back in the National Football League (NFL) for the Miami Dolphins and the Buffalo Bills. He was selected by the Dolphins in the seventh round of the 1991 NFL draft with the 191st overall pick. He played college football for the Illinois Fighting Illini.
