= Dwight Hollier =

American football player (born 1969)

No. 50, 56
- Position: Linebacker

Personal information
- Born: April 21, 1969 (age 57); Hampton, Virginia, U.S.
- Listed height: 6 ft 2 in (1.88 m)
- Listed weight: 246 lb (112 kg)

Career information
- High school: Kecoughtan (Hampton)
- College: North Carolina
- NFL draft: 1992: 4th round, 97th overall pick

Career history
- Miami Dolphins (1992–1999); Indianapolis Colts (2000)

Awards and highlights
- First-team All-ACC (1990); Second-team All-ACC (1989)

Career NFL statistics
- Tackles: 425
- Sacks: 3
- Interceptions: 2
- Stats at Pro Football Reference

Dwight Hollier (born April 21, 1969) is an American former professional football player who was a linebacker in the National Football League (NFL) with the Miami Dolphins and Indianapolis Colts. He was selected 97th overall by the Dolphins in the fourth round of the 1992 NFL draft. Hollier attended the University of North Carolina at Chapel Hill, where he played college football for the North Carolina Tar Heels.
