= Bobby Harden =

American football player (born 1967)

No. 45
- Position: Defensive back

Personal information
- Born: February 8, 1967 (age 59); Pahokee, Florida, U.S.
- Listed height: 6 ft 0 in (1.83 m)
- Listed weight: 192 lb (87 kg)

Career information
- High school: Sunrise (FL) Piper
- College: Miami (FL)
- NFL draft: 1990: 12th round, 315th overall pick

Career history
- Miami Dolphins (1990–1992); New England Patriots (1993)*; Miami Dolphins (1993)
- * Offseason or practice squad member only

Awards and highlights
- 2× National champion (1987, 1989)

Career NFL statistics
- Interceptions: 2
- Sacks: 1
- Fumble recoveries: 2
- Stats at Pro Football Reference

Bobby Harden (born February 8, 1967) is an American former professional football player for the Miami Dolphins. He played defensive back for the University of Miami from 1985 to 1989 and won two National Championships. He was selected by the Miami Dolphins in the 12th round of the 1990 NFL draft and played four seasons for the Dolphins from 1990 to 1993.
