= Bert Weidner =

American football player (born 1966)

No. 60
- Positions: Guard, center

Personal information
- Born: January 20, 1966 (age 60); Eden, New York, U.S.
- Listed height: 6 ft 3 in (1.91 m)
- Listed weight: 295 lb (134 kg)

Career information
- High school: Eden (NY)
- College: Kent State
- NFL draft: 1989: 11th round, 288th overall pick

Career history
- Miami Dolphins (1989–1996)

Career NFL statistics
- Games played: 81
- Games started: 39
- Fumble recoveries: 1
- Stats at Pro Football Reference

Bert James Weidner (born January 20, 1966) is an American former professional football player who played guard/center for six seasons for the Miami Dolphins from 1990 to 1995. Weidner was selected by the Dolphins in the 11th round of the 1989 NFL draft with the 288th overall pick. He played college football at Kent State University.
