= Tom Olivadotti =

American football coach (born 1945)

Personal information
- Born: September 22, 1945 (age 81); Long Branch, New Jersey, U.S.

Career information
- High school: Long Branch
- College: Upsala College

Career history
- Salesianum School (1972–1975) Head coach; Princeton (1976–1977) Offensive line coach, linebackers coach; Boston College (1978–1979) Defensive coordinator, linebackers coach; Miami (FL) (1980–1984) Defensive coordinator, linebackers coach; Cleveland Browns (1985) Defensive backs coach; Cleveland Browns (1986) Linebackers coach; Miami Dolphins (1987–1995) Defensive coordinator; Minnesota Vikings (1996–1999) Linebackers coach; New York Giants (2000–2003) Linebackers coach; Houston Texans (2004–2005) Linebackers coach

Awards and highlights
- National champion (1983)

Tom Olivadotti (born September 22, 1945) is an American former football coach. He coached in high school, college and the National Football League (NFL). He was the Miami Dolphins defensive coordinator from 1987 to 1995. He also coached in the NFL for the Cleveland Browns, Minnesota Vikings, New York Giants and Houston Texans. He coached in college for the Princeton Tigers, Boston College Eagles and Miami Hurricanes, where he was the defensive coordinator for the 1983 championship team.

== Personal life ==
His son Kirk Olivadotti is also a coach.
