= Jeff Cross (American football) =

American football player (born 1966)

No. 91
- Position: Defensive end

Personal information
- Born: March 25, 1966 (age 60); Riverside, California, U.S.
- Listed height: 6 ft 4 in (1.93 m)
- Listed weight: 280 lb (127 kg)

Career information
- High school: Palo Verde (Blythe, California)
- College: Missouri
- NFL draft: 1988: 9th round, 239th overall pick

Career history
- Miami Dolphins (1988–1996); Washington Redskins (1996)

Awards and highlights
- Pro Bowl (1990); Dolphins Walk of Fame (2014)

Career NFL statistics
- Tackles: 377
- Sacks: 59.5
- Interceptions: 1
- Stats at Pro Football Reference

Jeffrey Allen Cross (born May 25, 1966) is an American former professional football player who was a defensive end for the Miami Dolphins of the National Football League (NFL). He played college football for the Missouri Tigers. He was selected by the Dolphins in the ninth round of the 1988 NFL draft.

Cross was a Pro Bowl selection in 1990.

On April 19, 2018, Cross signed a one-day contract to retire as a member of the Dolphins.

Pre-draft measurables
Height	Weight	Hand span	40-yard dash	10-yard split	20-yard split	20-yard shuttle	Vertical jump	Broad jump	Bench press
6 ft 3 5/8 in (1.92 m)	261 lb (118 kg)	10 in (0.25 m)	4.93 s	1.72 s	2.86 s	4.72 s	28.0 in (0.71 m)	8 ft 3 in (2.51 m)	19 reps
