= Mark Dennis (American football) =

American football player (born 1965)

No. 74, 62
- Position: Offensive tackle

Personal information
- Born: April 15, 1965 (age 61); Junction City, Kansas, U.S.
- Listed height: 6 ft 6 in (1.98 m)
- Listed weight: 288 lb (131 kg)

Career information
- High school: Washington (Washington, Illinois)
- College: Illinois
- NFL draft: 1987: 8th round, 212th overall pick

Career history
- Miami Dolphins (1987–1993); Cincinnati Bengals (1994); Carolina Panthers (1995–1996)

Career NFL statistics
- Games played: 125
- Games started: 68
- Fumble recoveries: 3
- Stats at Pro Football Reference

Mark Francis Dennis (born April 15, 1965) is an American former professional football player who was an offensive tackle for 10 seasons in the National Football League (NFL) for the Miami Dolphins, Cincinnati Bengals, and Carolina Panthers. He played college football for the Illinois Fighting Illini and was selected by the Dolphins in the eighth round of the 1987 NFL draft with the 212th overall pick.

Pre-draft measurables
Height	Weight	Arm length	Hand span	40-yard dash	10-yard split	20-yard split	20-yard shuttle	Vertical jump	Broad jump	Bench press
6 ft 6 1/4 in (1.99 m)	292 lb (132 kg)	34 in (0.86 m)	10 1/4 in (0.26 m)	5.29 s	1.77 s	3.08 s	4.71 s	26.0 in (0.66 m)	8 ft 1 in (2.46 m)	18 reps
All values from NFL Combine
