= Jeff Uhlenhake =

American football player (born 1966)

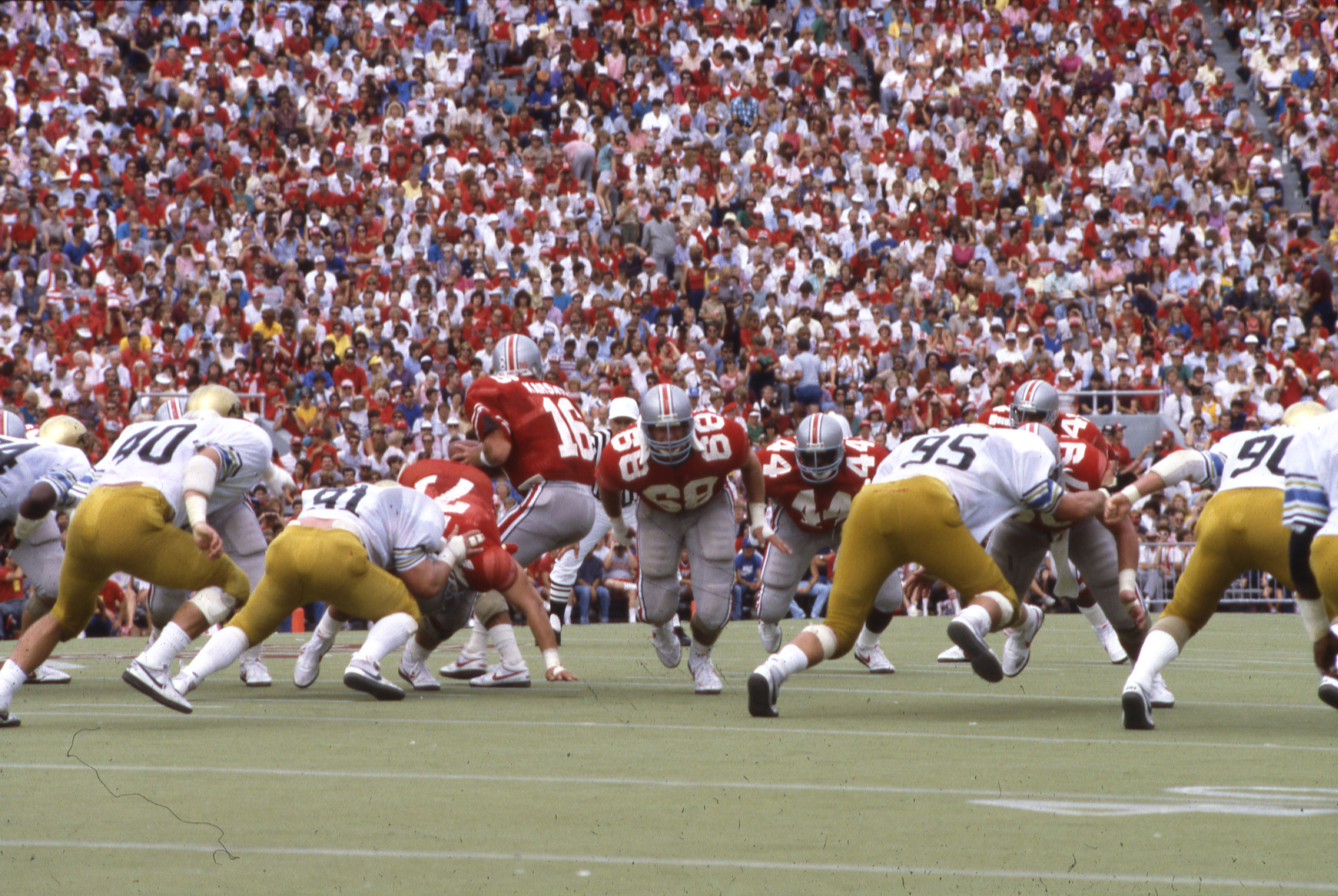
- Uhlenhake (#68) playing for the Ohio State Buckeyes in 1986

No. 63, 62, 55
- Position: Center

Personal information
- Born: January 28, 1966 (age 60); Indianapolis, Indiana, U.S.
- Listed height: 6 ft 3 in (1.91 m)
- Listed weight: 285 lb (129 kg)

Career information
- High school: Newark Catholic (Newark, Ohio)
- College: Ohio State
- NFL draft: 1989: 5th round, 121st overall pick

Career history

Playing
- Miami Dolphins (1989–1993); New Orleans Saints (1994–1995); Washington Redskins (1996–1998)

Coaching
- Lehman Catholic (OH) (2002) Head coach; Ohio State (2003) Offensive quality control coach; Cincinnati (2004) Offensive line coach; Cleveland Browns (2005–2006) Offensive line coach; Ohio State (2007–2018) Assistant strength coach; Bishop Watterson (OH) (2021–) Assistant offensive line coach

Awards and highlights
- First-team All-Big Ten (1986); Second-team All-Big Ten (1988)

Career NFL statistics
- Games played: 119
- Games started: 112
- Fumble recoveries: 2
- Stats at Pro Football Reference

Jeffrey Alan Uhlenhake (/ˈjuːlənˌheɪk/ YOO-lən-hayk; born January 28, 1966) is an American former professional football player who was a center for nine seasons in the National Football League (NFL). He played college football for the Ohio State Buckeyes and was selected by the Miami Dolphins in the fifth round of the 1989 NFL draft.

== Early life ==
Born in Indianapolis, Indiana, Uhlenhake moved to Ohio, settling in Beechwood. He had expected to attend Bishop Watterson High School to play football, but his family abruptly moved outside of Columbus and he was instead educated at Newark Catholic High School, where he was a three-sport athlete in football, basketball and baseball. In his four years of high school football, Newark Catholic went to a state final on four consecutive occasions, lifting the Division V title during his junior year in 1982.

== College career ==
Uhlenhake played college football for the Buckeyes at Ohio State University. He was a four-year starter, playing left guard as a freshman and sophomore and center as a junior and senior. Prior to his senior season, his teammates elected him as a team co-captain. That season, he was the team's only All-America selection, and his teammates voted him their Most Valuable Player. In 2008, he was inducted into the Ohio State Varsity O Hall of Fame.

== Professional career ==
Uhlenhake was selected by the Miami Dolphins in the fifth round of the 1989 NFL draft with the 121st overall pick. He immediately became the starting center and continued in that role for the next four seasons. The closest the Dolphins got to the Super Bowl during Uhlenhake's time there was in the 1992 season, where they lost to the Buffalo Bills in the AFC National Championship Game at Joe Robbie Stadium. While playing for the Dolphins, Uhlenhake had a small role in the 1994 comedy film Ace Ventura: Pet Detective, alongside Jim Carrey. That same year, he joined the New Orleans Saints. In his two years with the Saints, he started in every game but one.

In 1996, he joined the Washington Redskins, replacing John Gesek as the starting center, playing in 11 games, and in 13 games the following season. In 1998, his final season, Cory Raymer took over as the starting center. During his nine-year career, he started 112 out of 119 games.

== Coaching career ==
After his playing career, Uhlenhake had a number of coaching jobs. He had a short stint at Lehman Catholic High School as the athletics director, as well as head coach of the football team. He then served under Jim Tressel as offensive quality control coach for the Ohio State Buckeyes in the 2003 season, before working under Mark Dantonio as the offensive line coach for the Cincinnati Bearcats in the 2004 season. In 2005, Uhlenhake was named as the offensive line coach of the Cleveland Browns, where he spent two seasons, before returning to Ohio State to be the assistant strength coach, which he held for twelve seasons. In 2019, he remained at Ohio State to work with the women's lacrosse team as the strength coach, before retiring the following year. He has since worked as the assistant offensive line coach of his sons' high school football team at Bishop Watterson High School.

== Personal life ==
Uhlenhake is married to his wife Angie, with whom he has three children. His eldest son Jake, has committed to Ashland University to play both football and track and field.
