= Liffort Hobley =

American football player (born 1962)

No. 29
- Position: Safety

Personal information
- Born: May 12, 1962 (age 64); Shreveport, Louisiana, U.S.
- Listed height: 6 ft 0 in (1.83 m)
- Listed weight: 207 lb (94 kg)

Career information
- High school: C. E. Byrd (Shreveport)
- College: LSU
- NFL draft: 1985: 3rd round, 74th overall pick

Career history
- Pittsburgh Steelers (1985)*; San Diego Chargers (1985)*; St. Louis Cardinals (1985); Miami Dolphins (1986)*; Miami Dolphins (1987–1993)
- * Offseason or practice squad member only

Awards and highlights
- First-team All-SEC (1984); Second-team All-SEC (1983)

Career NFL statistics
- Interceptions: 5
- Sacks: 6
- Fumble recoveries: 8
- Stats at Pro Football Reference

Liffort Wayne Hobley (born May 12, 1962) is an American former professional football player who was a safety in the National Football League (NFL). Hobley attended Louisiana State University, where he played college football for the LSU Tigers. He was selected by the Pittsburgh Steelers in the third round of the 1985 NFL draft with the 74th overall pick and played seven seasons for the St. Louis Cardinals and Miami Dolphins. He had two touchdowns in his professional career, both on fumble recoveries.

Hobley was born in Shreveport, Louisiana, and attended C. E. Byrd High School.
