= David Griggs (American football) =

American football player (1967–1995)

No. 92
- Positions: Linebacker, defensive end

Personal information
- Born: February 5, 1967; Camden, New Jersey, U.S.
- Died: June 19, 1995 (aged 28); Davie, Florida, U.S.
- Listed height: 6 ft 3 in (1.91 m)
- Listed weight: 245 lb (111 kg)

Career information
- High school: Pennsauken (Pennsauken Township, New Jersey)
- College: Virginia
- NFL draft: 1989: 7th round, 186th overall pick

Career history
- New Orleans Saints (1989)*; Miami Dolphins (1989–1993); San Diego Chargers (1994)
- * Offseason or practice squad member only

Career NFL statistics
- Sacks: 14.5
- Fumble recoveries: 4
- Interceptions: 1
- Stats at Pro Football Reference

David Wesley Griggs (February 5, 1967 – June 19, 1995) was an American professional football player who was a linebacker in the National Football League (NFL) for six seasons. He played college football for the Virginia Cavaliers. Griggs was selected by the New Orleans Saints in the seventh round of the 1989 NFL draft. He started in Super Bowl XXIX for the San Diego Chargers. He compiled 14.5 sacks, one interception, and four fumble recoveries in his NFL career.

Griggs grew up in Delair in Pennsauken Township, New Jersey, where he attended and played high school football for Pennsauken High School.

He is the younger brother of former NFL tight end, Billy Griggs.

Griggs died at the age of 28 in Fort Lauderdale, Florida in 1995, when his speeding car slid off an expressway ramp from Florida's Turnpike and collided with a sign pole.

== See also ==
- List of gridiron football players who died during their careers
