= Gary Stevens (American football) =

American football coach (born 1943)

Gary Stevens (born March 19, 1943) is a former American football coach. He was the offensive coordinator Miami Dolphins of the National Football League (NFL) from 1989 to 1997. He also coached at the University of Miami from 1980 to 1988, helping the Hurricanes win national championships in 1983 and 1987. From 1980 to 1982 he served as the wide receivers coach for the Hurricanes before being promoted to offensive coordinator and quarterbacks coach, positions he held from 1983 to 1988. Stevens was a finalist for the Miami Hurricanes and Philadelphia Eagles head coaching jobs in 1995.
