= Eddie Jones (American football executive) =

American football executive (1938–2012)

Eddie J. Jones (June 18, 1938 – June 27, 2012) was an American football executive in the National Football League (NFL). He joined the Miami Dolphins in 1988 as the vice president of administration and finance before becoming the Dolphins' executive vice president and general manager in 1990. He became the team's president in 1996 and retired in 2005.
