= Tom Heckert Sr. =

American football coach, scout, and executive

Tom Heckert
Biographical details
- Born: September 18, 1938 (age 88)

Coaching career (HC unless noted)

Football
- 1973–1981: Adrian

Basketball
- 1970–1971: Adrian

Baseball
- 1969–1970: Adrian

Administrative career (AD unless noted)
- 1982–1986: Cleveland Browns (scout)
- 1989–2007: Miami Dolphins (personnel)

Head coaching record
- Overall: 43–36–2 (football); 1–19 (basketball); 20–20 (baseball)

Accomplishments and honors

Championships
- Football; 1 MIAA (1980)

Tom Heckert (September 18, 1938 – September 20, 2016) was an American football coach, scout, and executive. He served as the head football coach at Adrian College from 1973 to 1981, compiling a record of 43–36–2. Heckert was then a scout with the Cleveland Browns from 1982 to 1986 and a personnel executive with the Miami Dolphins from 1989 until his retirement in 2007. His son, Tom Heckert Jr., was the former general manager of the Browns.

== Head coaching record ==
=== Football ===
Year	Team	Overall	Conference	Standing	Bowl/playoffs
Adrian Bulldogs (Michigan Intercollegiate Athletic Association) (1973–1981)
1973	Adrian	1–8	0–5	6th	
1974	Adrian	2–7	0–5	6th	
1975	Adrian	4–5	2–3	T–4th	
1976	Adrian	3–6	1–4	5th	
1977	Adrian	4–4–1	2–2–1	3rd	
1978	Adrian	6–3	4–1	2nd	
1979	Adrian	6–2–1	3–1–1	2nd	
1980	Adrian	9–0	5–0	1st	
1981	Adrian	8–1	4–1	2nd	
Adrian:		43–36–2	21–22–2		
Total:		43–36–2			
National championship Conference title Conference division title or championship game berth
