= List of NFL players (Clink–Cz) =

This is a list of players who have appeared in at least one regular season or postseason game in the National Football League (NFL), American Football League (AFL), or All-America Football Conference (AAFC) and have a last name that falls between "Clink" and "Cz". For the rest of the C's, see list of NFL players (Ca–Cline). This list is accurate through the end of the 2025 NFL season.

== Clink–Col ==
- Dextor Clinkscale
- Joey Clinkscales
- Charles Clinton
- Ha Ha Clinton-Dix
- Colin Cloherty
- Jack Cloud
- Mike Cloud
- Dave Cloutier
- Herbert Clow
- Johnny Clowes
- David Clowney
- Jadeveon Clowney
- Don Clune
- Tyler Clutts
- Rich Coady (born 1944)
- Rich Coady (born 1976)
- John Coaker
- Dexter Coakley
- Bert Coan
- Ben Coates
- Ray Coates
- Sammie Coates
- Sherrod Coates
- Josiah Coatney
- Daniel Coats
- Alf Cobb
- David Cobb
- DeAndra' Cobb
- Garry Cobb
- Marvin Cobb
- Mike Cobb
- Omari Cobb
- Randall Cobb
- Reggie Cobb
- Robert Cobb
- Tom Cobb
- Trevor Cobb
- Lyron Cobbins
- Eric Cobble
- Cedric Cobbs
- Duffy Cobbs
- Patrick Cobbs
- R. J. Cobbs
- Avon Cobourne
- Keondre Coburn
- Colin Cochart
- Antonio Cochran
- Devin Cochran
- Earl Cochran
- Leon Cochran
- Mark Cochran
- Moose Cochran
- Red Cochran
- Jack Cochrane
- Gene Cockrell
- Ross Cockrell
- Don Cockroft
- Jack Coco
- Joe Cocozzo
- Sherman Cocroft
- Ron Coder
- Nakia Codie
- Brandon Codrington
- Bill Cody
- Dan Cody
- Ed Cody
- Mac Cody
- Shaun Cody
- Tay Cody
- Terrence Cody
- Michael Coe
- Rodney Coe
- Stan Cofall
- Joe Cofer
- Mike Cofer (born 1960)
- Mike Cofer (born 1964)
- Glen Coffee
- Pat Coffee
- Donald Coffey
- Junior Coffey
- Ken Coffey
- Wayne Coffey
- Randy Coffield
- Chase Coffman
- Paul Coffman
- Barry Cofield
- Tim Cofield
- Gail Cogdill
- George Coghill
- Abe Cohen
- Dustin Cohen
- Javion Cohen
- Joe Cohen
- Landon Cohen
- Tarik Cohen
- Angelo Coia
- Will Cokeley
- Jalen Coker
- Jack Colahan
- Steve Colavito
- Adrian Colbert
- Danny Colbert
- Darrell Colbert
- Jordan Colbert
- Keary Colbert
- Lewis Colbert
- Rondy Colbert
- Connor Colby
- Dan Colchico
- Jim Colclough
- Ricardo Colclough
- AJ Cole III
- Audie Cole
- Chris Cole
- Colin Cole
- Dylan Cole
- Eddie Cole
- Emerson Cole
- Fred Cole
- John Cole
- Justin Cole
- Keelan Cole
- Larry Cole
- Lee Cole
- Linzy Cole
- Marquice Cole
- Mason Cole
- Matt Cole
- Myles Cole
- Nick Cole
- Pete Cole
- Robin Cole
- Terry Cole
- Trent Cole
- Tommy Colella
- Al Coleman
- Alonzo Coleman
- Andre Coleman (born 1972)
- Andre Coleman (born 1984)
- Anthony Coleman
- Antonio Coleman
- Ben Coleman
- Brandon Coleman (born 1992)
- Brandon Coleman (born 2000)
- Charles Coleman
- Chris Coleman
- Clarence Coleman
- Corey Coleman
- Cosey Coleman
- Dan Coleman
- Davon Coleman
- Deandre Coleman
- Dennis Coleman
- Derrick Coleman
- DJ Coleman
- Don Coleman
- Drew Coleman
- Eric Coleman
- Erik Coleman
- Fred Coleman (born 1953)
- Fred Coleman (born 1975)
- Greg Coleman
- Herb Coleman
- Justin Coleman
- KaRon Coleman
- Kenyon Coleman
- Keo Coleman
- Keon Coleman
- Kurt Coleman
- Larnel Coleman
- Lavon Coleman
- Leonard Coleman
- Lincoln Coleman
- Marco Coleman
- Marcus Coleman
- Monte Coleman
- Pat Coleman
- Ralph Coleman
- Rod Coleman
- Ronnie Coleman
- Shon Coleman
- Sidney Coleman
- Steve Coleman
- Tevin Coleman
- Travis Coleman
- Xavier Coleman
- Laveranues Coles
- James Coley
- Kevis Coley
- Stacy Coley
- Trevon Coley
- Jake Colhouer
- Stalin Colinet
- Daryn Colledge
- Elmer Collett
- Austin Collie
- Bruce Collie
- Bobby Collier
- Chris Collier
- Floyd Collier
- Jim Collier
- L.J. Collier
- Mike Collier
- Reggie Collier
- Richard Collier
- Steve Collier
- Tim Collier
- Alex Collins
- Alfred Collins
- Andre Collins
- Anthony Collins
- Aviante Collins
- Beaux Collins
- Bill Collins (born 1901)
- Bill Collins (born 1922)
- Bobby Collins
- Brett Collins
- Calvin Collins
- Cameron Collins
- Cecil Collins
- Clarence Collins
- Dwight Collins
- Fabray Collins
- Gary Collins
- George Collins
- Gerald Collins
- Glen Collins
- Greg Collins
- Harry Collins
- Jalen Collins
- Jamie Collins
- Javiar Collins
- Jed Collins
- Jerald Collins
- Jerome Collins
- Jim Collins
- Kerry Collins
- Kirk Collins
- La'el Collins
- Landon Collins
- Larry Collins
- Maliek Collins
- Mark Collins
- Mo Collins
- Nate Collins
- Nick Collins
- Nico Collins
- Patrick Collins
- Paul Collins (born 1907)
- Paul Collins (born 1922)
- Ray Collins
- Rip Collins
- Roosevelt Collins
- Ryan Collins
- Shane Collins
- Shawn Collins
- Sonny Collins
- Todd Collins (born 1970)
- Todd Collins (born 1971)
- Tony Collins
- Trent Collins
- Zaven Collins
- Cris Collinsworth
- Ferric Collons
- Doug Colman
- Wayne Colman
- Mickey Colmer
- Don Colo
- Marc Colombo
- Harry Colon
- Willie Colon
- Trystan Colon-Castillo
- Tony Colorito
- Britton Colquitt
- Craig Colquitt
- Dustin Colquitt
- Jimmy Colquitt
- Junior Colson
- Marques Colston
- Tim Colston
- Jeff Colter
- Lloyd Colteryahn
- George Colton
- Aaron Colvin
- Jim Colvin
- Rosevelt Colvin
- Neal Colzie

== Com–Coo ==
- Bill Combs
- Branson Combs
- Chris Combs (born 1958)
- Chris Combs (born 1976)
- Derek Combs
- Darren Comeaux
- Greg Comella
- John Comer
- Marty Comer
- Ulysses Comier
- John Cominsky
- Sanders Commings
- Vince Commisa
- Chuck Commiskey
- Irv Comp
- Tony Compagno
- Jonathan Compas
- Chuck Compton
- Dick Compton
- Mike Compton
- Ogden Compton
- Tom Compton
- Will Compton
- Ed Comstock
- Rudy Comstock
- Bill Conaty
- Jack Concannon
- Rick Concannon
- Merl Condit
- Jon Condo
- Tom Condon
- Brannon Condren
- Glen Condren
- Fred Cone
- Kevin Cone
- Charlie Conerly
- Josh Conerly Jr.
- Mel Conger
- Larry Conjar
- Cary Conklin
- Jack Conklin
- Tyler Conklin
- Red Conkright
- Shane Conlan
- Gerry Conlee
- Chris Conley
- Gareon Conley
- John Conley
- Steve Conley (born 1949)
- Steve Conley (born 1972)
- T. J. Conley
- Chris Conlin
- Ray Conlin
- Dick Conn
- Tuffy Conn
- Harry Connaughton
- Albert Connell
- Bill Connell
- Mike Connell
- Ward Connell
- Mike Connelly
- Ryan Connelly
- Chamarri Conner
- Clyde Conner
- Darion Conner
- Hayden Conner
- James Conner
- John Conner
- Kavell Conner
- Snoop Conner
- Tanner Conner
- Dan Conners
- Dan Connolly
- Harry Connolly
- Ted Connolly
- Bill Connor
- Dan Connor
- Dutch Connor
- George Connor
- Ham Connors
- Scott Connot
- Zuehl Conoly
- Frank Conover
- Larry Conover
- Scott Conover
- Sean Conover
- Bobby Joe Conrad
- Chris Conrad
- J.R. Conrad
- Marty Conrad
- Matthew Conrath
- Sean Considine
- Irv Constantine
- Chris Conte
- Enio Conti
- John Contoulis
- Bill Contz
- Brett Conway
- Curtis Conway
- Dave Conway
- Ernie Conwell
- Joe Conwell
- Jimmy Conzelman
- Alex Cook
- Anthony Cook
- Brady Cook
- Bryan Cook
- Charles Cook
- Chris Cook
- Clair Cook
- Connor Cook
- Dalvin Cook
- Damion Cook
- Dave Cook
- Dylan Cook
- Ed Cook
- Emanuel Cook
- Erik Cook
- Fred Cook
- Gene Cook
- Greg Cook
- Jameel Cook
- James Cook (born 1888)
- James Cook (born 1999)
- Jared Cook
- Kelly Cook
- Kyle Cook
- Leon Cook
- Marv Cook
- Rashard Cook
- Ryan Cook
- Ted Cook
- Toi Cook
- Bill Cooke
- Ed Cooke
- Logan Cooke
- Brandin Cooks
- Elijah Cooks
- Johnie Cooks
- Kerry Cooks
- Rayford Cooks
- Terrence Cooks
- Bob Coolbaugh
- Chris Cooley
- Larry Coombs
- Tom Coombs
- Joe Coomer
- Ty Coon
- Mark Cooney
- Nolan Cooney
- Rob Coons
- Travis Coons
- Adrian Cooper
- Amari Cooper
- Andre Cooper
- Bert Cooper
- Bill Cooper
- Bud Cooper
- Bump Cooper
- Chris Cooper
- Darius Cooper
- Deke Cooper
- Earl Cooper
- Edgerrin Cooper
- Evan Cooper
- George Cooper
- Hal Cooper
- Jarrod Cooper
- Jim Cooper (born 1924)
- Jim Cooper (born 1955)
- Joe Cooper
- Jon Cooper
- Jonathan Cooper
- Jonathon Cooper
- Josh Cooper (born 1980)
- Josh Cooper (born 1989)
- Keith Cooper
- Ken Cooper
- Louis Cooper
- Marcus Cooper
- Mark Cooper
- Marquis Cooper
- Norm Cooper
- Pharoh Cooper
- Rafael Cooper
- Reggie Cooper
- Richard Cooper
- Riley Cooper
- Sam Cooper
- Stephen Cooper
- Thurlow Cooper
- Xavier Cooper

== Cop–Coy ==
- Frank Cope
- Jim Cope
- Anthony Copeland
- Brandon Copeland
- Danny Copeland
- Horace Copeland
- Jim Copeland
- John Copeland
- Marquise Copeland
- Ron Copeland
- Russell Copeland
- Quinton Coples
- Charlie Copley
- Al Coppage
- Gus Coppens
- Terrance Copper
- Austin Corbett
- George Corbett
- James Corbett
- Steve Corbett
- Jashaun Corbin
- Don Corbitt
- Tom Corbo
- Bunny Corcoran
- Jack Corcoran
- King Corcoran
- Lou Cordileone
- Olie Cordill (born 1916)
- Olie Cordill (born 1943)
- Jim Cordle
- Jorge Cordova
- Sam Cordovano
- Cody Core
- Walt Corey
- Chuck Corgan
- Mike Corgan
- John Corker
- Anthony Corley
- Bert Corley
- Chris Corley
- Malachi Corley
- Joe Cormier
- Joe Corn
- Jerry Cornelison
- Ajani Cornelius
- Charles Cornelius
- Bo Cornell
- Jack Cornell
- Jashon Cornell
- Martin Cornelson
- Reggie Corner
- Paul Cornick
- Frank Cornish
- Frank Cornish, Jr.
- Al Cornsweet
- Fred Cornwell
- Bob Coronado
- Frank Corral
- Kamalei Correa
- Chuck Correal
- Kip Corrington
- Rico Corsetti
- Chris Cortemeglia
- Julio Cortes
- Bruce Cortez
- José Cortéz
- Jon Corto
- Blake Corum
- Anthony Corvino
- Quentin Coryatt
- Red Corzine
- Doug Cosbie
- Quan Cosby
- Thomas Cosgrove
- Bruce Coslet
- Samuel Cosmi
- Don Cosner
- Eric Coss
- Dave Costa (born 1941)
- Dave Costa (born 1978)
- Paul Costa
- Phil Costa
- Blake Costanzo
- Brad Costello
- Joe Costello
- Tom Costello
- Vince Costello
- Joe Coster
- Ray Costict
- Doug Costin
- Junius Coston
- Zed Coston
- Chad Cota
- Jerricho Cotchery
- Jeff Cothran
- Paige Cothren
- Mark Cotney
- Brad Cottam
- Barney Cotton
- Craig Cotton
- Fest Cotton
- Forrest Cotton
- Jeff Cotton
- Kenyon Cotton
- Lester Cotton
- Marcus Cotton
- Russ Cotton
- Bill Cottrell
- Dana Cottrell
- Nathan Cottrell
- Ted Cottrell
- Tim Couch
- Carter Coughlin
- Danny Coughlin
- Frank Coughlin
- Isaiah Coulter
- Tex Coulter
- Blake Countess
- Johnny Counts
- Jerome Couplin III
- Al Couppee
- Steve Courson
- Gerry Courtney
- Matt Courtney
- Vince Courville
- Terry Cousin
- Tom Cousineau
- Brad Cousino
- Kirk Cousins
- Oniel Cousins
- Keke Coutee
- Larry Coutre
- Brandon Coutu
- Jim Covert
- Britain Covey
- Chris Covington
- Christian Covington
- Damien Covington
- Jaime Covington
- John Covington
- Scott Covington
- Tony Covington
- Bob Cowan
- Charley Cowan
- Larry Cowan
- Les Cowan
- Rashaad Coward
- Byron Cowart
- Sam Cowart
- Bill Cowher
- Gerard Cowhig
- Jacob Cowing
- Al Cowlings
- John Cowne
- James Cowser
- Delbert Cowsette
- Aaron Cox
- Arthur Cox
- Bill Cox
- Brenton Cox
- Bryan Cox
- Bryan Cox Jr.
- Chandler Cox
- Curome Cox
- Demetrious Cox
- Derek Cox
- Fletcher Cox
- Fred Cox
- Greg Cox
- Jabril Cox
- Jeremy Cox
- Jim Cox (born 1920)
- Jim Cox (born 1946)
- Kennard Cox
- Larry Cox
- Michael Cox
- Mike Cox
- Morgan Cox
- Norm Cox
- Perrish Cox
- Renard Cox
- Ron Cox
- Steve Cox
- Tom Cox
- Torrie Cox
- Brock Coyle
- Eric Coyle
- Ross Coyle
- Tyler Coyle

== Cra–Cro ==
- Claude Crabb
- Bob Crable
- Shawn Crable
- Clem Crabtree
- Clyde Crabtree
- Eric Crabtree
- Michael Crabtree
- Tom Crabtree
- River Cracraft
- Nate Craddock
- Donnie Craft
- Jason Craft
- Russ Craft
- Jerry Crafts
- Clark Craig
- Dameyune Craig
- Dobie Craig
- Larry Craig
- Neal Craig
- Paco Craig
- Reggie Craig
- Roger Craig
- Steve Craig
- Milt Crain
- Joe Crakes
- Carl Cramer
- Casey Cramer
- Dennis Crane
- Gary Crane
- Paul Crane
- Jack Crangle
- Mike Crangle
- Bill Crass
- Bill Craven
- Su'a Cravens
- Aaron Craver
- Keyuo Craver
- Aaron Crawford
- Bill Crawford
- Casey Crawford
- Charles Crawford
- Denny Crawford
- Derrick Crawford
- Ed Crawford
- Elbert Crawford
- Fred Crawford
- Hilton Crawford
- Jack Crawford
- James Crawford
- Jim Crawford
- Keith Crawford
- Ken Crawford
- Kitan Crawford
- Mike Crawford (born 1964)
- Mike Crawford (born 1974)
- Mush Crawford
- Richard Crawford
- Rufus Crawford
- Tim Crawford
- Tyrone Crawford
- Vernon Crawford
- Xavier Crawford
- Ken Crawley
- Jeremy Crawshaw
- Dick Crayne
- Patrick Crayton
- Gabe Crecion
- Bob Creech
- Lou Creekmur
- Bill Cregar
- Milan Creighton
- Ted Cremer
- Carl Crennel
- Leon Crenshaw
- Willis Crenshaw
- Brandon Crenshaw-Dickson
- Bobby Crespino
- Smiley Creswell
- Ron Crews
- Terry Crews
- James Cribbs
- Joe Cribbs
- Josh Cribbs
- Scott Crichton
- Jared Crick
- Bernie Crimmins
- Juron Criner
- Harold Crisler
- Joel Crisman
- Shadwick Criss
- Cris Crissy
- Chuck Crist
- Jeff Criswell
- Kirby Criswell
- Ray Criswell
- Hank Critchfield
- Larry Critchfield
- Ken Criter
- Ray Crittenden
- Jack Crittendon
- Jim Crocicchia
- Chris Crocker
- Bobby Crockett
- Damarea Crockett
- Henri Crockett
- John Crockett
- Monte Crockett
- Ray Crockett
- Willis Crockett
- Zack Crockett
- Mike Croel
- Abe Croft
- Don Croft
- Lee Croft
- Tiny Croft
- Win Croft
- Don Croftcheck
- Antonio Cromartie
- Marcus Cromartie
- Da'Mon Cromartie-Smith
- Nolan Cromwell
- Peter Cronan
- Bill Cronin (born 1901)
- Bill Cronin (born 1943)
- Fritz Cronin
- Gene Cronin
- Jack Cronin
- Jerry Cronin
- Tommy Cronin
- Coy Cronk
- Doc Cronkhite
- Al Crook
- Corey Croom
- Jason Croom
- Larry Croom
- Sylvester Croom
- Chris Crooms
- Marshall Cropper
- Cleveland Crosby
- Clifton Crosby
- Mason Crosby
- Maxx Crosby
- Phil Crosby
- Ron Crosby
- Steve Crosby
- Tyrell Crosby
- Jacory Croskey-Merritt
- Alan Cross
- Billy Cross
- Bobby Cross
- Charles Cross
- Howard Cross
- Howard Cross III
- Irv Cross
- Jeff Cross
- Justin Cross
- Nick Cross
- Randy Cross
- Dave Crossan
- Keion Crossen
- Leon Crosswhite
- Cole Croston
- Dave Croston
- Jim Crotty
- Billy Crouch
- Terry Crouch
- David Croudip
- Ray Crouse
- Jake Crouthamel
- Al Crow
- John David Crow
- Lindon Crow
- Orien Crow
- Wayne Crow
- Channing Crowder
- Earl Crowder
- Jamison Crowder
- Randy Crowder
- Tae Crowder
- Tim Crowder
- Larry Crowe
- Paul Crowe
- Angelo Crowell
- Germane Crowell
- Isaiah Crowell
- Odis Crowell
- Bernie Crowl
- Jim Crowley
- Joe Crowley
- Rae Crowther
- Saville Crowther
- Brodie Croyle
- Phil Croyle

== Cru–Cz ==
- Derrick Crudup
- Dane Cruikshank
- Bob Crum
- Frank Crum
- Jaden Crumedy
- Andrew Crummey
- Dwayne Crump
- George Crump
- Harry Crump
- Alge Crumpler
- Carlester Crumpler
- Doug Crusan
- Tommy Crutcher
- Buddy Crutchfield
- Darrel Crutchfield
- Dwayne Crutchfield
- Ronnie Cruz
- Victor Cruz
- Bob Cryder
- Larry Csonka
- Paul Cuba
- Jermelle Cudjo
- Yannik Cudjoe-Virgil
- Walt Cudzik
- Ward Cuff
- Quinton Culberson
- Jim Culbreath
- Sean Culkin
- Willie Cullars
- David Cullen
- Dave Cullity
- Chris Culliver
- Jim Cullom
- Derrick Cullors
- Curley Culp
- Devin Culp
- Brad Culpepper
- Daunte Culpepper
- Ed Culpepper
- Willie Culpepper
- Al Culver
- Frank Culver
- Rodney Culver
- Tyrone Culver
- Jeff Cumberland
- George Cumby
- Frank Cumiskey
- Ed Cummings
- Joe Cummings
- Kenwin Cummings
- Mack Cummings
- Billy Cundiff
- Ernest Cuneo
- B. J. Cunningham
- Bennie Cunningham
- Benny Cunningham
- Carl Cunningham
- Cookie Cunningham
- Dick Cunningham
- Doug Cunningham
- Douglas Cunningham
- Ed Cunningham
- Eric Cunningham
- Jay Cunningham
- Jermaine Cunningham
- Jerome Cunningham
- Jim Cunningham
- Justice Cunningham
- Korey Cunningham
- Leon Cunningham
- Malik Cunningham
- Randall Cunningham
- Richie Cunningham
- Rick Cunningham
- Sam Cunningham
- T. J. Cunningham
- Zach Cunningham
- Gary Cuozzo
- Baylor Cupp
- Keith Cupp
- Bree Cuppoletti
- Jeff Curchin
- Tony Curcillo
- Mike Curcio
- Armand Cure
- Will Cureton
- Jake Curhan
- Kamren Curl
- August Curley
- Dan Curley
- Harry Curran
- Pat Curran
- Rennie Curran
- William Curran
- Mike Current
- Airese Currie
- Dan Currie
- Herschel Currie
- Justin Currie
- Bill Currier
- Don Currivan
- Aaron Curry
- Bill Curry
- Buddy Curry
- Clarence Curry
- Craig Curry
- DeMarcus Curry
- Dominique Curry
- Donté Curry
- Eric Curry
- Ivory Curry
- Julius Curry
- Markus Curry
- Ronald Curry
- Roy Curry
- Scott Curry
- Shane Curry
- Vinny Curry
- Donald Curtin
- Bobby Curtis
- Canute Curtis
- Isaac Curtis
- Kevin Curtis
- McClendon Curtis
- Mike Curtis
- Scott Curtis
- Tom Curtis
- Tony Curtis
- Travis Curtis
- Harry Curzon
- Lloyd Cushenberry III
- Brian Cushing
- Matt Cushing
- Peter Cusick
- Randy Cuthbert
- Harry Cutler
- Jay Cutler
- Jacob Cutrera
- Gary Cutsinger
- Austin Cutting
- Andy Cvercko
- Johnathan Cyprien
- Hec Cyre
- Ziggy Czarobski
