= List of NFL players (Ca–Cline) =

This is a list of players who have appeared in at least one regular season or postseason game in the National Football League (NFL), American Football League (AFL), or All-America Football Conference (AAFC) and have a last name that falls between "Ca" and "Cline". For the rest of the C's, see list of NFL players (Clink–Cz). This list is accurate through the end of the 2025 NFL season.

== Cab–Cap ==
- Bryce Cabeldue
- Jason Cabinda
- Brian Cabral
- Larry Cabrelli
- Augie Cabrinha
- Ernie Caddel
- Eddie Cade
- Mossy Cade
- Travaris Cadet
- Dave Cadigan
- Jim Cadile
- Glenn Cadrez
- John Cadwell
- Ivan Caesar
- George Cafego
- Lee Roy Caffey
- Lawrence Cager
- Chris Cagle
- Jim Cagle
- John Cagle
- Bill Cahill
- Dave Cahill
- Denny Cahill
- Ronnie Cahill
- Tiny Cahoon
- Deon Cain
- J. V. Cain
- Jeremy Cain
- Jim Cain
- Joe Cain
- Lynn Cain
- Patrick Cain
- Yodny Cajuste
- Pete Calac
- Jeremy Calahan
- Raymond Calais
- Ralph Calcagni
- Grant Calcaterra
- Alan Caldwell
- Andre Caldwell
- Antoine Caldwell
- Bruce Caldwell
- Bryan Caldwell
- Darryl Caldwell
- David Caldwell (born 1965)
- David Caldwell (born 1987)
- Jamaree Caldwell
- Mike Caldwell (born March 28, 1971)
- Mike Caldwell (born August 31, 1971)
- Ravin Caldwell
- Reche Caldwell
- Scott Caldwell
- Tony Caldwell
- Trey Caldwell
- Jamie Caleb
- Brian Calhoun
- Don Calhoun
- Duke Calhoun
- Eric Calhoun
- Mike Calhoun
- Rick Calhoun
- Shaq Calhoun
- Shilique Calhoun
- Taveze Calhoun
- Lonny Calicchio
- Tyrone Calico
- Mike Caliendo
- Dean Caliguire
- Austin Calitro
- Jack Call
- Kevin Call
- Bill Callahan
- Bob Callahan
- Bryce Callahan
- Dan Callahan
- Jim Callahan
- Joe Callahan
- Lee Calland
- Antonio Callaway
- Marquez Callaway
- Rob Callaway
- Ken Callicutt
- Len Calligaro
- Bill Callihan
- Chris Calloway
- Ernie Calloway
- Rocky Calmus
- Tony Calvelli
- Jorrick Calvin
- Tom Calvin
- Jake Camarda
- Greg Camarillo
- Rich Camarillo
- Dennis Cambal
- Dalen Cambre
- Glenn Cameron
- Jack Cameron
- John Cameron
- Jordan Cameron
- Paul Cameron
- Jalen Camp
- Jim Camp
- Reggie Camp
- Al Campana
- Michael Campanaro
- Joe Campanella
- Arnold Campbell
- Bill Campbell
- Bob Campbell
- Bruce Campbell
- Calais Campbell
- Caleb Campbell
- Carter Campbell
- Chance Campbell
- D. J. Campbell
- Dalevon Campbell
- Dan Campbell
- De'Vondre Campbell
- Dick Campbell
- Don Campbell
- Earl Campbell
- Elijah Campbell
- Gary Campbell
- Glenn Campbell
- Ibraheim Campbell
- Jack Campbell (born 1958)
- Jack Campbell (born 2000)
- Jason Campbell
- Jeff Campbell
- Jesse Campbell
- Jihaad Campbell
- Jim Campbell
- Joe Campbell (born 1955)
- Joe Campbell (born 1966)
- John Campbell
- Kelly Campbell
- Ken Campbell
- Khary Campbell
- Lamar Campbell
- Leon Campbell
- Marion Campbell
- Mark Campbell (born 1972)
- Mark Campbell (born 1975)
- Matt Campbell
- Michael Campbell
- Mike Campbell
- Milt Campbell
- Parris Campbell
- Rich Campbell
- Russ Campbell
- Scott Campbell
- Sonny Campbell
- Stan Campbell
- Tevaughn Campbell
- Tommie Campbell
- Tommy Campbell
- Tyson Campbell
- Will Campbell
- Woody Campbell
- James Campen
- Billy Campfield
- Bob Campiglio
- T.J. Campion
- Nick Campofreda
- Don Campora
- Alan Campos
- Larry Canada
- Kameron Canaday
- Tony Canadeo
- Jim Canady
- Maurice Canady
- Justin Canale
- Rocco Canale
- Whit Canale
- Phil Cancik
- Trung Canidate
- Sheldon Canley
- A. J. Cann
- John Cannady
- Pat Cannamela
- Al Cannava
- Joe Cannavino
- John Cannella
- Sal Cannella
- James Cannida
- Anthony Cannon
- Billy Cannon
- Billy Cannon Jr.
- John Cannon
- Marcus Cannon
- Mark Cannon
- Trenton Cannon
- Leo Cantor
- Barry Cantrell
- Rolando Cantú
- Chris Canty (born 1976)
- Chris Canty (born 1982)
- Bill Capece
- James Capers
- Selvish Capers
- Wayne Capers
- Cap Capi
- Warren Capone
- Dick Capp
- Alex Cappa
- Bob Cappadona
- Gino Cappelletti
- John Cappelletti
- Bill Cappleman
- Bill Capps
- Carl Capria
- Ralph Capron
- Jim Capuzzi

== Car–Cay ==
- Mac Cara
- Roland Caranci
- Glenn Carano
- Al Carapella
- Joe Caravello
- Glenn Carberry
- Harper Card
- Carl Cardarelli
- Tank Carder
- Fred Cardinal
- Joe Cardona
- Joe Cardwell
- John Cardwell
- Lloyd Cardwell
- Bob Carey
- Brian Carey
- Don Carey
- Joe Carey
- Ka'Deem Carey
- Richard Carey
- Vernon Carey
- Steve Cargile
- Gabe Carimi
- Harland Carl
- Jaylon Carlies
- Cooper Carlisle
- Anders Carlson
- Cody Carlson
- Daniel Carlson
- Dean Carlson
- Hal Carlson
- Irv Carlson
- Jeff Carlson
- John Carlson
- Mark Carlson
- Oke Carlson
- Roy Carlson
- Stephen Carlson
- Wes Carlson
- Zuck Carlson
- Darryl Carlton
- Wray Carlton
- Charlie Carman
- Ed Carman
- Jackson Carman
- Jon Carman
- Al Carmichael
- Harold Carmichael
- Paul Carmichael
- Roc Carmichael
- Ray Carnelly
- Art Carney
- Chuck Carney
- John Carney
- Brett Carolan
- Reggie Carolan
- J. C. Caroline
- Joe Carollo
- Roger Caron
- Don Carothers
- Joe Carpe
- Bobby Carpenter
- Brian Carpenter
- Dan Carpenter
- Dwaine Carpenter
- Jack Carpenter
- James Carpenter
- Keion Carpenter
- Ken Carpenter
- Lew Carpenter
- Preston Carpenter
- Rob Carpenter (born 1955)
- Rob Carpenter (born 1968)
- Ron Carpenter (born 1941)
- Ron Carpenter (born 1948)
- Ron Carpenter (born 1970)
- Rudy Carpenter
- Steve Carpenter
- Tariq Carpenter
- Austin Carr
- Brandon Carr
- Carl Carr
- Charley Carr
- Chetti Carr
- Chris Carr
- David Carr
- Derek Carr
- Deveron Carr
- Earl Carr
- Eddie Carr
- Fred Carr
- Gregg Carr
- Harlan Carr
- Henry Carr
- Jimmy Carr
- Levert Carr
- Lydell Carr
- Paul Carr
- Reggie Carr
- Roger Carr
- Tom Carr
- Cornellius Carradine
- Josh Carraway
- Alphonso Carreker
- Vince Carreker
- Duane Carrell
- John Carrell
- Ryan Carrethers
- T. J. Carrie
- Derek Carrier
- Mark Carrier (born 1965)
- Mark Carrier (born 1968)
- Adam Carriker
- Alex Carrington
- Darren Carrington
- Ed Carrington
- Paul Carrington
- Russ Carroccio
- Ahmad Carroll
- Bart Carroll
- Bird Carroll
- Gene Carroll
- Herman Carroll
- Jay Carroll
- Jim Carroll
- Joe Carroll
- Leo Carroll
- Nolan Carroll
- Ronnie Carroll
- Travis Carroll
- Vic Carroll
- Wesley Carroll
- Leonte Carroo
- Paul Ott Carruth
- Rae Carruth
- Caelen Carson
- Carlos Carson
- Chris Carson
- Glenn Carson
- Harry Carson
- Howard Carson
- Johnny Carson
- Kern Carson
- Leonardo Carson
- Malcolm Carson
- Tra Carson
- Jordan Carstens
- Dwayne Carswell
- Robert Carswell
- Abdul Carter
- Ajani Carter
- Alex Carter (born 1963)
- Alex Carter (born 1994)
- Allen Carter
- Andre Carter
- Andre Carter II
- Anthony Carter
- Barrett Carter
- Bernard Carter
- Blanchard Carter
- Brandon Carter
- Bruce Carter
- Carl Carter
- Cethan Carter
- Chris Carter (born 1974)
- Chris Carter (born 1989)
- Cris Carter
- Dale Carter
- Daryl Carter
- David Carter (born 1953)
- David Carter (born 1987)
- DeAndre Carter
- Delone Carter
- DeWayne Carter
- Dexter Carter
- Drew Carter
- Dyshod Carter
- Gerald Carter
- Jalen Carter
- Jamal Carter
- Jason Carter
- Ja'Tyre Carter
- Jermaine Carter Jr.
- Jerome Carter
- Jim Carter
- Jimmie Carter
- Joe Carter (born 1909)
- Joe Carter (born 1962)
- Jon Carter
- Jonathan Carter
- Kent Carter
- Kerry Carter
- Kevin Carter
- Ki-Jana Carter
- Kyle Carter
- Lorenzo Carter
- Louis Carter
- M. L. Carter
- Marty Carter
- Michael Carter (born 1960)
- Michael Carter
- Michael Carter II
- Mike Carter
- Nate Carter
- Pat Carter
- Perry Carter
- Quincy Carter
- Quinton Carter
- Rodney Carter
- Roger Carter
- Ron'Dell Carter
- Ross Carter
- Rubin Carter
- Russell Carter
- Shyheim Carter
- Steve Carter
- T. J. Carter (born 1998)
- T. J. Carter (born 1999)
- Tim Carter (born 1978)
- Tim Carter (born 1979)
- Todd Carter
- Tom Carter
- Tony Carter (born 1972)
- Tony Carter (born 1986)
- Tory Carter
- Tyrone Carter
- Virgil Carter
- Walter Carter
- Willie Carter
- Zachary Carter
- Jason Carthen
- Milt Carthens
- Maurice Carthon
- Ran Carthon
- Charlie Carton
- Rock Cartwright
- Johndale Carty
- Dale Carver
- Mel Carver
- Shante Carver
- Jerome Carvin
- Larry Carwell
- Ken Casanega
- Tommy Casanova
- Rick Casares
- Chad Cascadden
- Ernie Case
- Frank Case
- Pete Case
- Scott Case
- Stoney Case
- Alvro Casey
- Bernie Casey
- Chance Casey
- Eddie Casey
- James Casey
- Jurrell Casey
- Pete Casey
- Tim Casey
- Tom Casey
- Antoine Cash
- Chris Cash
- Jeremy Cash
- John Cash
- Keith Cash
- Kerry Cash
- Rick Cash
- Blake Cashman
- Jonathan Casillas
- Tony Casillas
- Ken Casner
- Antoine Cason
- Aveion Cason
- Jim Cason
- Wendell Cason
- Cy Casper
- Dave Casper
- Craig Cassady
- Howard Cassady
- Frank Cassara
- Matt Cassel
- Tom Cassese
- Dick Cassiano
- Cassidy
- Ron Cassidy
- Walt Cassidy
- Mike Casteel
- Rich Caster
- Jesse Castete
- Jim Castiglia
- Jeremiah Castille
- Simeon Castille
- Tim Castille
- Luis Castillo
- Sergio Castillo
- Eric Castle
- Toby Caston
- Anthony Castonzo
- Chris Castor
- Sebastian Castro
- Tariq Castro-Fields
- Tony Catalano
- Tyler Catalina
- Al Catanho
- Mark Catano
- Chandler Catanzaro
- Mike Catapano
- Toney Catchings
- Greg Cater
- Mike Caterbone
- Thomas Caterbone
- Royal Cathcart
- Sam Cathcart
- Tom Catlin
- Daryl Cato
- Sean Cattouse
- Jehuu Caulcrick
- Knute Cauldwell
- Mike Caussin
- Carmen Cavalli
- Matt Cavanaugh
- Ronnie Caveness
- Jim Caver
- Quinton Caver
- Ben Cavil
- Kwame Cavil
- Grady Cavness
- John Cavosie
- Lowell Caylor
- Les Caywood

== Ce–Cha ==
- Lloyd Cearing
- Curtis Ceaser
- Chuck Cecil
- Jimmy Cefalo
- Brent Celek
- Garrett Celek
- Bob Celeri
- Oliver Celestin
- Mario Celotto
- Tony Cemore
- John Cenci
- Larry Centers
- Frank Cephous
- Joshua Cephus
- Quintez Cephus
- Gene Ceppetelli
- Matt Cercone
- Gordy Ceresino
- Joe Cerne
- Marq Cerqua
- Jacques Cesaire
- William Cesare
- Sal Cesario
- Andre Chachere
- Jeff Chadwick
- Pat Chaffey
- K'Lavon Chaisson
- Mike Chalenski
- George Chalmers
- Byron Chamberlain
- Chris Chamberlain
- Dan Chamberlain
- Garth Chamberlain
- Frank Chamberlin
- Guy Chamberlin
- Bill Chambers
- Chris Chambers
- Kirk Chambers
- Rusty Chambers
- Wally Chambers
- Al Chamblee
- Corey Chamblin
- Chaz Chambliss
- Ed Champagne
- Jim Champion
- Kam Chancellor
- Robert Chancey
- Al Chandler
- Bob Chandler
- Chris Chandler
- Don Chandler
- Edgar Chandler
- Jeff Chandler
- Karl Chandler
- Nate Chandler
- Scott Chandler
- Sean Chandler
- Thornton Chandler
- Ty Chandler
- Wes Chandler
- Lynn Chandnois
- Jamar Chaney
- Roger Chanoine
- Tom Chantiles
- Shaun Chapas
- Clarence Chapman
- Doug Chapman
- Gil Chapman
- Josh Chapman
- Kory Chapman
- Lamar Chapman
- Mike Chapman
- Ted Chapman
- Leo Chappell
- David Chapple
- Jack Chapple
- Bob Chappuis
- Dick Chapura
- Zach Charbonnet
- DJ Chark
- Irvin Charles
- Jamaal Charles
- John Charles
- Mike Charles
- Orson Charles
- Saahdiq Charles
- Stefan Charles
- Win Charles
- Jeff Charleston
- Clifford Charlton
- Ike Charlton
- Joseph Charlton
- Taco Charlton
- Carl Charon
- Len Charpier
- Ben Chase
- Ja'Marr Chase
- Martin Chase
- Ralph Chase
- Matt Chatham
- Antonio Chatman
- Clifford Chatman
- Elijah Chatman
- Jesse Chatman
- Ricky Chatman
- Laz Chavez
- Eddie Chavis
- Barney Chavous
- Corey Chavous

== Che–Ci ==
- Ernie Cheatham
- Lloyd Cheatham
- Cooney Checkaye
- Louis Cheek
- Richard Cheek
- Steve Cheek
- B.W. Cheeks
- Camaron Cheeseman
- Michael Cheever
- Chimdi Chekwa
- Donald Chelf
- Leo Chenal
- Red Chenoweth
- Claudin Cherelus
- Gosder Cherilus
- Hal Cherne
- George Cheroke
- Bill Cherry
- Deron Cherry
- Ed Cherry
- Je'Rod Cherry
- Mike Cherry
- Raphel Cherry
- Stan Cherry
- Tony Cherry
- Chuck Cherundolo
- Red Chesbro
- Al Chesley
- Anthony Chesley
- Frank Chesley
- John Chesley
- Chester A. Chesney
- George Chesser
- Jehu Chesson
- Wes Chesson
- Chris Chester
- Larry Chester
- Raymond Chester
- Julius Chestnut
- Joe Chetti
- George Cheverko
- Randy Chevrier
- Jim Cheyunski
- Darrin Chiaverini
- John Chick
- Fred Chicken
- John Chickerneo
- Anthony Chickillo
- Nick Chickillo
- Tony Chickillo
- Bam Childress
- Fred Childress
- Joe Childress
- O. J. Childress
- Ray Childress
- Zion Childress
- Clarence Childs
- Henry Childs
- Jimmy Childs
- Ron Childs
- Brandon Chillar
- Gene Chilton
- Jeremy Chinn
- Bill Chipley
- John Chirico
- Dan Chisena
- Andy Chisick
- Efton Chism
- Ed Chlebek
- Mark Chmura
- Bob Choate
- Putt Choate
- Max Choboian
- Tashard Choice
- John Choma
- Steve Chomyszak
- Jason Chorak
- Dick Chorovich
- Robbie Chosen
- Joseph Chrape
- Wayne Chrebet
- Drue Chrisman
- Brady Christensen
- Erik Christensen
- Frank Christensen
- George Christensen
- Jeff Christensen
- Koester Christensen
- Todd Christensen
- Brad Christenson
- Bob Christian
- Gerald Christian
- Geron Christian
- Marqui Christian
- Bob Christiansen
- Cole Christiansen
- Jack Christiansen
- Marty Christiansen
- Oscar Christianson
- Steve Christie
- Floyd Christman
- Paul Christman
- Herb Christopher
- Jim Christopherson
- Ryan Christopherson
- Dick Christy
- Earl Christy
- Greg Christy
- Jeff Christy
- Pete Chryplewicz
- Bradley Chubb
- Nick Chubb
- Ben Chukwuma
- Patrick Chukwurah
- Eugene Chung
- Patrick Chung
- Jordan Chunn
- Barry Church
- Ricky Churchman
- Donnis Churchwell
- Don Chuy
- Jimmy Ciarlo
- Joe Cibulas
- Mike Ciccolella
- Ben Ciccone
- Gene Cichowski
- Tom Cichowski
- Jack Cichy
- Brad Cieslak
- Gus Cifelli
- Bob Cifers
- Ed Cifers
- Ralph Cindrich
- Lewis Cine
- Larry Cipa
- Andre Cisco
- Steve Cisowski
- Vinny Ciurciu
- Frank Civiletto

== Cla–Cline ==
- Neil Clabo
- Tyson Clabo
- Darryl Clack
- Jim Clack
- Ryan Clady
- Walt Clago
- Chris Claiborne
- Morris Claiborne
- Robert Claiborne
- Frank Clair
- Rickey Claitt
- Jack Clancy
- Kendrick Clancy
- Sam Clancy
- Sean Clancy
- Stu Clancy
- Chuck Clanton
- Sam Claphan
- Will Clapp
- Dennis Claridge
- Travis Claridge
- Al Clark
- Algy Clark
- Alijah Clark
- Allan Clark
- Babe Clark
- Bernard Clark
- Beryl Clark
- Bill Clark (born 1892)
- Bill Clark (born ?)
- Boobie Clark
- Bret Clark
- Brian Clark (born 1958)
- Brian Clark (born 1983)
- Bruce Clark
- Bryan Clark
- Charlie Clark
- Chris Clark
- Chuck Clark
- Corey Clark
- Dallas Clark
- Damone Clark
- Danny Clark
- Danny Lee Clark
- Darius Clark
- Darryl Clark
- Dean Clark
- Derrick Clark
- Desmond Clark
- Devin Clark
- Dexter Clark
- Don Clark
- Dutch Clark
- Dwight Clark
- Ernie Clark
- Frank Clark
- Gail Clark
- Gary Clark
- Greg Clark (born 1965)
- Greg Clark (born 1972)
- Hal Clark
- Herman Clark
- Howard Clark
- James Clark
- Jeremy Clark (born 1983)
- Jeremy Clark (born 1994)
- Jessie Clark
- Jim Clark
- Jon Clark
- Jordan Clark
- Kei'Trel Clark
- Kelvin Clark
- Ken Clark (born 1948)
- Ken Clark (born 1966)
- Kenny Clark (born 1978)
- Kenny Clark (born 1995)
- Kevin Clark
- Le'Raven Clark
- Leroy Clark
- Louis Clark
- Mario Clark
- Michael Clark
- Mike Clark (born 1940)
- Mike Clark (born 1959)
- Monte Clark
- Phil Clark
- Pots Clark
- Randy Clark (born 1957)
- Randy Clark (born 1962)
- Reggie Clark
- Rico Clark
- Robert Clark
- Ryan Clark
- Sedric Clark
- Spark Clark
- Stevan Clark
- Steve Clark (born 1960)
- Steve Clark (born 1962)
- Torin Clark
- Vinnie Clark
- Wayne Clark (born 1918)
- Wayne Clark (born 1947)
- Willie Clark
- Adrien Clarke
- Frank Clarke
- Fred Clarke
- Hagood Clarke
- Harry Clarke
- Ken Clarke
- Leon Clarke
- Phil Clarke
- Will Clarke
- Bill Clarkin
- Conrad Clarks
- Stu Clarkson
- Jeromey Clary
- Bob Clasby
- Corwin Clatt
- Bobby Clatterbuck
- Blaine Clausell
- Jimmy Clausen
- Jared Clauss
- Shannon Clavelle
- Ben Claxton
- Billy Clay
- Boyd Clay
- Charles Clay
- Hayward Clay
- John Clay (born 1964)
- John Clay (born 1988)
- Kaelin Clay
- Ozzie Clay
- Randy Clay
- Roy Clay
- Walt Clay
- Willie Clay
- Adrian Clayborn
- Raymond Clayborn
- Chris Claybrooks
- DeVone Claybrooks
- Felipe Claybrooks
- Chase Claypool
- Ralph Claypool
- Carey Clayton
- Harvey Clayton
- Keenan Clayton
- Mark Clayton (born 1961)
- Mark Clayton (born 1982)
- Michael Clayton
- Ralph Clayton
- Stan Clayton
- Thomas Clayton
- Zach Clayton
- Emmett Cleary
- Paul Cleary
- Cam Cleeland
- Bob Clemens (born 1933)
- Bob Clemens (born 1939)
- Cal Clemens
- Kellen Clemens
- Alex Clement
- Anthony Clement
- Corey Clement
- Henry Clement
- Johnny Clement
- Chase Clements
- Chuck Clements
- Chunky Clements
- Nate Clements
- Tom Clements
- Vince Clements
- T. J. Clemmings
- Charlie Clemons
- Chris Clemons (born 1981)
- Chris Clemons (born 1985)
- Craig Clemons
- Duane Clemons
- Micheal Clemons
- Nic Clemons
- Pinball Clemons
- Ray Clemons (born 1912)
- Ray Clemons (born 1921)
- Toney Clemons
- Topper Clemons
- Mike Clendenen
- Ainer Cleve
- Asante Cleveland
- Ben Cleveland
- Ezra Cleveland
- Greg Cleveland
- Tyrie Cleveland
- Sean Clifford
- Chad Clifton
- Gregory Clifton
- Kyle Clifton
- Ben Clime
- Doug Cline
- Jackie Cline
- Kameron Cline
- Ollie Cline
- Tony Cline
- Tony Cline Jr.
