= 2012 Houston Texans season =

11th season in franchise history

- Owner: Bob McNair
- General manager: Rick Smith
- Head coach: Gary Kubiak
- Offensive coordinator: Rick Dennison
- Defensive coordinator: Wade Phillips
- Home stadium: Reliant Stadium

Results
- Record: 12–4
- Division place: 1st AFC South
- Playoffs: Won Wild Card Playoffs (vs. Bengals) 19–13; Lost Divisional Playoffs (at Patriots) 28–41
- Pro Bowlers: 10: QB Matt Schaub; RB Arian Foster; WR Andre Johnson; TE Owen Daniels; T Duane Brown; G Wade Smith; C Chris Myers; DE J. J. Watt; CB Johnathan Joseph; ST Bryan Braman

Uniform
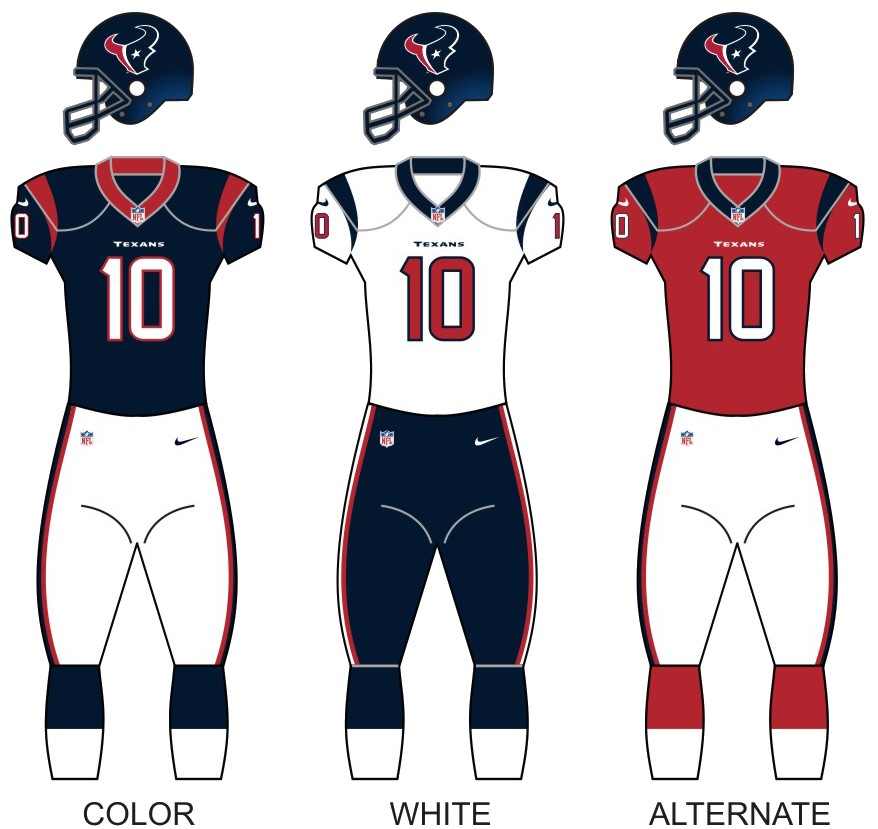

The 2012 season was the Houston Texans' 11th in the National Football League (NFL) and their seventh under head coach Gary Kubiak. The Texans improved on their 10–6 record from 2011, finishing two games better with a franchise-best 12–4 mark. The Texans won their second consecutive AFC South division title, and defeated the Cincinnati Bengals in the wild card round of the playoffs for a second consecutive season. However, they were defeated by the New England Patriots in the divisional round. The Texans scored 416 points in the regular season, which is a team record.

The team would not be able to match that win total until 2025, which also ended with a loss to the New England Patriots in the divisional round.

== 2012 draft class ==
2012 Houston Texans draft
Round	Pick	Player	Position	College	Notes
1	26	Whitney Mercilus	DE	Illinois	
3	68	DeVier Posey	WR	Ohio State	^{[a]}
3	76	Brandon Brooks *	OG	Miami (OH)	^{[b]}
4	99	Ben Jones	C	Georgia	^{[b]}
4	121	Keshawn Martin	WR	Michigan State	
4	126	Jared Crick	DE	Nebraska	^{[c]}
5	161	Randy Bullock	PK	Texas A&M	
6	195	Nick Mondek	OT	Purdue	
Made roster * Made at least one Pro Bowl during career

Notes

^{^[a]}From Buccaneers
^{^[b]} The team traded linebacker DeMeco Ryans to the Philadelphia Eagles in exchange for the Eagles' fourth-round selection (#99 overall; originally acquired from the Tampa Bay Buccaneers), and swapped third-round selections with the Eagles (the Texans originally held the #88 selection).
^{^[c]}From the Patriots through the Broncos and the Buccaneers.

== Staff ==
2012 Houston Texans staff
Front office: Founder/chairman/CEO – Bob McNair; Vice chairman – Philip Burguières; Vice chairman – D. Cal McNair; Executive vice president/general manager – Rick Smith; President – Jamey Rootes; Vice president of football administration – Chris Olsen; Director of pro personnel – Brian Gardner; Senior personnel advisor – Bobby Grier; Director of college scouting – Mike Maccagnan; Head coaches: Head coach – Gary Kubiak; Assistant head coach/defensive line – Bill Kollar; Offensive coaches: Offensive coordinator – Rick Dennison; Quarterbacks – Karl Dorrell; Running backs – Chick Harris; Wide receivers – Larry Kirksey; Assistant wide receivers – Marc Lubick; Tight ends – Brian Pariani; Offensive line – John Benton; Assistant offensive line – Jim Ryan; Offensive assistant – Dan Hammerschmidt	Defensive coaches: Defensive coordinator – Wade Phillips; Linebackers – Reggie Herring; Assistant linebackers – Bobby King; Secondary – Vance Joseph; Assistant defensive backs – Perry Carter; Special teams coaches: Special teams – Joe Marciano; Strength and conditioning: Head strength and conditioning – Cedric Smith; Assistant strength and conditioning – Matt Schiotz; Assistant strength and conditioning – Derik Keyes

== Final roster ==
2012 Houston Texans roster
Quarterbacks (QB): 8 Matt Schaub; 13 T. J. Yates; Running backs (RB): 40 Tyler Clutts FB; 28 Justin Forsett; 23 Arian Foster; 44 Ben Tate; Wide receivers (WR): 18 Lestar Jean; 80 Andre Johnson; 82 Keshawn Martin RS; 11 DeVier Posey; 83 Kevin Walter; Tight ends (TE): 86 James Casey; 81 Owen Daniels; 88 Garrett Graham	Offensive linemen (OL): 79 Brandon Brooks G; 76 Duane Brown T; 62 Antoine Caldwell G/C; 66 Andrew Gardner G; 68 Ryan Harris T; 60 Ben Jones G/C; 55 Chris Myers C; 75 Derek Newton T; 74 Wade Smith G; 67 Cody White G; Defensive linemen (DL): 95 Shaun Cody NT; 93 Jared Crick DE; 90 Terrell McClain NT; 92 Earl Mitchell NT; 94 Antonio Smith DE; 99 J. J. Watt DE	Linebackers (LB): 98 Connor Barwin OLB; 50 Bryan Braman OLB; 52 Tim Dobbins ILB; 53 Bradie James ILB; 59 Whitney Mercilus OLB; 57 Jesse Nading OLB; 58 Brooks Reed OLB; 97 Barrett Ruud ILB; 51 Darryl Sharpton ILB; Defensive backs (DB): 22 Alan Ball CB; 20 Roc Carmichael CB; 27 Quintin Demps SS; 26 Brandon Harris CB; 25 Kareem Jackson CB; 24 Johnathan Joseph CB; 31 Shiloh Keo FS; 38 Danieal Manning SS; 35 Eddie Pleasant SS; 29 Glover Quin FS; 30 Stanford Routt CB; Special teams (ST): 17 Shayne Graham K; 5 Donnie Jones P; 46 Jon Weeks LS	Practice squad: 85 Logan Brock TE; 65 Keith Browner Jr. DE; 49 Cameron Collins LB; 64 Delano Johnson LB; 7 Case Keenum QB; 15 Jeff Maehl WR; 69 Nick Mondek T; 87 Steve Skelton TE; 48 Phillip Supernaw TE (IR); Reserve: 4 Randy Bullock K (IR); 78 Rashad Butler T (IR); 56 Brian Cushing ILB (IR); 45 Keyaron Fox ILB (IR); 91 Ra'Shon Harris NT (IR); 72 David Hunter NT (IR); 96 Tim Jamison DE (IR); 21 Brice McCain CB (IR/DFR); Rookies in italics 53 active, 9 reserve, 8 practice squad

== Schedule ==
=== Preseason ===
Week	Date	Opponent	Result	Record	Venue	Recap
1	August 11	at Carolina Panthers	**W** 26–13	1–0	Bank of America Stadium	Recap
2	August 18	San Francisco 49ers	**W** 20–9	2–0	Reliant Stadium	Recap
3	August 25	at New Orleans Saints	**L** 27–34	2–1	Mercedes-Benz Superdome	Recap
4	August 30	Minnesota Vikings	**W** 28–24	3–1	Reliant Stadium	Recap

=== Regular season ===
Week	Date	Opponent	Result	Record	Venue	Recap
1	September 9	Miami Dolphins	**W** 30–10	1–0	Reliant Stadium	Recap
2	September 16	at **Jacksonville Jaguars**	**W** 27–7	2–0	EverBank Field	Recap
3	September 23	at Denver Broncos	**W** 31–25	3–0	Sports Authority Field at Mile High	Recap
4	September 30	**Tennessee Titans**	**W** 38–14	4–0	Reliant Stadium	Recap
5	October 8	at New York Jets	**W** 23–17	5–0	MetLife Stadium	Recap
6	October 14	Green Bay Packers	**L** 24–42	5–1	Reliant Stadium	Recap
7	October 21	Baltimore Ravens	**W** 43–13	6–1	Reliant Stadium	Recap
8	Bye					
9	November 4	Buffalo Bills	**W** 21–9	7–1	Reliant Stadium	Recap
10	November 11	at Chicago Bears	**W** 13–6	8–1	Soldier Field	Recap
11	November 18	**Jacksonville Jaguars**	**W** 43–37 (OT)	9–1	Reliant Stadium	Recap
12	November 22	at Detroit Lions	**W** 34–31 (OT)	10–1	Ford Field	Recap
13	December 2	at **Tennessee Titans**	**W** 24–10	11–1	LP Field	Recap
14	December 10	at New England Patriots	**L** 14–42	11–2	Gillette Stadium	Recap
15	December 16	**Indianapolis Colts**	**W** 29–17	12–2	Reliant Stadium	Recap
16	December 23	Minnesota Vikings	**L** 6–23	12–3	Reliant Stadium	Recap
17	December 30	at **Indianapolis Colts**	**L** 16–28	12–4	Lucas Oil Stadium	Recap

Note: Intra-division opponents are in bold text.

=== Postseason ===
Round	Date	Opponent (seed)	Result	Record	Venue	Recap
Wild Card	January 5, 2013	Cincinnati Bengals (6)	**W** 19–13	1–0	Reliant Stadium	Recap
Divisional	January 13, 2013	at New England Patriots (2)	**L** 28–41	1–1	Gillette Stadium	Recap

== Game summaries ==
=== Regular season ===
==== Week 1: vs. Miami Dolphins ====
Week One: Miami Dolphins at Houston Texans – Game summary

Quarter	1	2	3	4	Total
Dolphins	3	0	7	0	10
Texans	0	24	3	3	30

at Reliant Stadium, Houston, Texas

- Date: September 9
- Game time: 12:00 p.m. CDT
- Game weather: Played indoors (retractable roof closed)
- Game attendance: 71,566
- Referee: Don King
- TV announcers (CBS): Ian Eagle and Dan Fouts

Game information

First quarter

- MIA – Dan Carpenter 39-yard field goal, 3:12. Dolphins 3–0. Drive: 8 plays, 44 yards, 3:58.

Second quarter

- HOU – Shayne Graham 35-yard field goal, 6:12. Tied 3–3. Drive: 4 plays, −5 yards, 1:11.
- HOU – Arian Foster 14-yard run (Shayne Graham kick), 1:52. Texans 10–3. Drive: 7 plays, 54 yards, 2:07.
- HOU – Arian Foster 2-yard run (Shayne Graham kick), 0:43. Texans 17–3. Drive: 2 plays, 27 yards, 0:53.
- HOU – Andre Johnson 14-yard pass from Matt Schaub (Shayne Graham kick), 0:07. Texans 24–3. Drive: 3 plays, 31 yards, 0:21.

Third quarter

- MIA – Marcus Thigpen 72-yard punt return (Dan Carpenter kick), 13:12. Texans 24–10.
- HOU – Shayne Graham 40-yard field goal, 6:30. Texans 27–10. Drive: 11 plays, 64 yards, 6:42.

Fourth quarter

- HOU – Shayne Graham 19-yard field goal, 12:22. Texans 30–10. Drive: 12 plays, 72 yards, 6:59.

Top passers

- MIA – Ryan Tannehill – 20/36, 219 yards, 3 INT
- HOU – Matt Schaub – 20/31, 266 yards, TD

Top rushers

- MIA – Reggie Bush – 14 rushes, 69 yards
- HOU – Arian Foster – 26 rushes, 79 yards, 2 TD

Top receivers

- MIA – Reggie Bush – 6 receptions, 46 yards
- HOU – Andre Johnson – 8 receptions, 119 yards

The Houston Texans began their 10th anniversary campaign with lofty expectations, with many columnists picking them to represent the AFC in the Super Bowl. Despite the lofty expectations, the Texans began the season rather flatly, only managing a field goal on offense against a younger, more inexperienced Dolphins team. Miami played the Texans tough throughout the first half, thanks in part to Reggie Bush's contributions on the ground. However, the game took a stunning turn after the two-minute warning of the first half as the Texans forced three Dolphin turnovers, and quickly converted them into touchdowns to stretch the lead to 24–3 before halftime. The Texans continued to ride their defense to a season opening 30–10 win over Miami. Houston improved to 7–0 all-time against the Miami Dolphins as they started their season 1–0.

==== Week 2: at Jacksonville Jaguars ====
Week Two: Houston Texans at Jacksonville Jaguars – Game summary

Quarter	1	2	3	4	Total
Texans	10	7	7	3	27
Jaguars	0	0	7	0	7

at EverBank Field, Jacksonville, Florida

- Date: September 16
- Game time: 1:00 p.m. EDT/12:00 p.m. CDT
- Game weather: 83 °F (28 °C), clear
- Game attendance: 62,907
- Referee: David White
- TV announcers (CBS): Marv Albert and Rich Gannon

Game information

First quarter

- HOU – Shayne Graham 31-yard field goal, 9:25. Texans 3–0. Drive: 13 plays, 66 yards, 5:35.
- HOU – Arian Foster 1-yard run (Shayne Graham kick), 0:15. Texans 10–0. Drive: 6 plays, 42 yards, 2:37.

Second quarter

- HOU – Ben Tate 8-yard run (Shayne Graham kick), 6:49. Texans 17–0. Drive: 7 plays, 58 yards, 3:34.

Third quarter

- JAC – Maurice Jones-Drew 5-yard pass from Blaine Gabbert (Josh Scobee kick), 11:44. Texans 17–7. Drive: 2 plays, 37 yards, 0:51.
- HOU – Ben Tate 2-yard run (Shayne Graham kick), 2:30. Texans 24–7. Drive: 17 plays, 85 yards, 9:14.

Fourth quarter

- HOU – Shayne Graham 37-yard field goal, 7:20. Texans 27–7. Drive: 10 plays, 73 yards, 6:15.

Top passers

- HOU – Matt Schaub – 26/35, 195 yards
- JAC – Blaine Gabbert – 7/19, 53 yards, TD

Top rushers

- HOU – Arian Foster – 28 rushes, 110 yards, TD
- JAC – Maurice Jones-Drew – 12 rushes, 60 yards

Top receivers

- HOU – Owen Daniels – 6 receptions, 47 yards
- JAC – Laurent Robinson – 3 receptions, 49 yards

The Texans entered their first division clash of the season looking to establish their will on the ground. Behind a punishing ground attack with Arian Foster and Ben Tate, as well as an efficient defensive effort led by second year defensive lineman J.J. Watt, the Texans dominated the game with a time of possession of 43:17 on their way to a 27–7 victory in Jacksonville. With the win, the Texans improved to 2–0 for the 3rd straight season. On the first drive, Houston drove 60 yards aided by Tate and took a 3–0 lead on a Shayne Graham 31-yard field goal. The Jaguars mounted a drive into Texan territory but they had to punt from the 44. Both teams went three-and-out on their next drive. After a long pass play, the Texans were at the 1. 2 plays later Arian Foster ran it in from the 1 to make it 10–0. Two drives later Houston scored on an 8-yard run from Ben Tate. At halftime it was 17–0 Texans. In the 3rd quarter, quarterback Matt Schaub threw an interception returned to the Houston 37. Jacksonville scored in just 2 plays on a Td pass from Blaine Gabbert to running back Maurice-Jones Drew. It was 17–7. Then the Texans made a 17 play drive resulting in a 2-yard Ben Tate touchdown to make it 24–7. The Texans would get a field goal to make it 27–7, and that would end the game.

==== Week 3: at Denver Broncos ====
Week Three: Houston Texans at Denver Broncos – Game summary

Quarter	1	2	3	4	Total
Texans	7	14	10	0	31
Broncos	5	6	0	14	25

at Sports Authority Field at Mile High, Denver, Colorado

- Date: September 23
- Game time: 3:25 p.m. CDT/2:25 p.m. MDT
- Game weather: 84 °F (29 °C), clear
- Game attendance: 76,566
- Referee: Jerry Frump
- TV announcers (CBS): Jim Nantz and Phil Simms

Game information

First quarter

- DEN – Matt Schaub tackled in end zone by Elvis Dumervil, 13:20. Broncos 2–0.
- DEN – Matt Prater 32-yard field goal, 8:41. Broncos 5–0. Drive: 10 plays, 46 yards, 4:33.
- HOU – Andre Johnson 60-yard pass from Matt Schaub (Shayne Graham kick), 6:28. Texans 7–5. Drive: 3 plays, 89 yards, 2:03.

Second quarter

- HOU – Arian Foster 3-yard pass from Matt Schaub (Shayne Graham kick), 10:47. Texans 14–5. Drive: 14 plays, 98 yards, 7:05.
- HOU – Kevin Walter 52-yard pass from Matt Schaub (Shayne Graham kick), 8:54. Texans 21–5. Drive: 2 plays, 57 yards, 0:37.
- DEN – Matt Prater 23-yard field goal, 5:44. Texans 21–8. Drive: 9 plays, 67 yards, 3:10.
- DEN – Matt Prater 53-yard field goal, 0:00. Texans 21–11. Drive: 5 plays, 25 yards, 0:33.

Third quarter

- HOU – Shayne Graham 41-yard field goal, 9:11. Texans 24–11. Drive: 7 plays, 18 yards, 3:45.
- HOU – Owen Daniels 14-yard pass from Matt Schaub (Shayne Graham kick), 1:13. Texans 31–11. Drive: 5 plays, 72 yards, 2:19.

Fourth quarter

- DEN – Brandon Stokley 38-yard pass from Peyton Manning (Matt Prater kick), 9:49. Texans 31–18. Drive: 2 plays, 50 yards, 0:31.
- DEN – Joel Dreessen 6-yard pass from Peyton Manning (Matt Prater kick), 3:00. Texans 31–25. Drive: 16 plays, 40 yards, 5:08.

Top passers

- HOU – Matt Schaub – 17/30, 290 yards, 4 TD, INT
- DEN – Peyton Manning – 26/52, 330 yards, 2 TD

Top rushers

- HOU – Arian Foster – 25 rushes, 105 yards
- DEN – Willis McGahee – 12 rushes, 36 yards

Top receivers

- HOU – Kevin Walter – 3 receptions, 73 yards, TD
- DEN – Eric Decker – 8 receptions, 136 yards

The Texans entered this early season matchup coming face-to-face once again with a familiar longtime AFC South division rival in former Colts quarterback Peyton Manning, who had sat out the 2011 season due to a neck injury. Now back and in Denver, Manning came into the game looking to continue his success over the Houston Texans franchise. However, it was Matt Schaub who helped Houston build an early lead, throwing 4 touchdown passes despite suffering an ear injury where he lost a chunk of his ear. Despite Peyton Manning fueling a Broncos comeback attempt in the 4th quarter, the Texans held on, defeating the Broncos by 6 points. With the win, the Texans improved to 3–0 for the first time ever. This was also their first road victory against Peyton Manning as they improved to 1–0 against Peyton in road games as a Bronco (0–9 vs. Peyton on the road as a Colt). The Broncos sacked Matt Schaub on the 2nd drive of the game making it 2–0. The Broncos drove 48 yards and kicked a 32-yard field goal from Matt Prater to make it 5–0. On the next drive, Schaub threw a 60-yard touchdown pass to Andre Johnson to make it 7–5. On their next drive, Houston went on a 98-yard drive resulting in a 3-yard touchdown pass from Schaub to Arian Foster making it 14–5. After a 3-and-out by Denver, Schaub threw a 52-yard touchdown pass to Kevin Walters to make it 21–5. Denver scored a field goal by Prater to make it 21–8. Denver would get another field goal before the half ended to make it 21–11. To open the second half Houston scored to make it 24–11. Then Schaub threw to Owen Daniels to make it 31–11. But after a Houston fumble, Denver scored its first touchdown of the night to cut it to 31–18. After a punt, Denver scored again to make it 31–25. However Houston stopped a lateral play on the final play of the game to win 31–25 and improve to 3–0. Schaub recorded 4 touchdown passes, his highest total of the season at that point.

==== Week 4: vs. Tennessee Titans ====
Week Four: Tennessee Titans at Houston Texans – Game summary

Quarter	1	2	3	4	Total
Titans	0	7	0	7	14
Texans	14	0	14	10	38

at Reliant Stadium, Houston, Texas

- Date: September 30
- Game time: 12:00 p.m. CDT
- Game weather: Played indoors (retractable roof closed)
- Game attendance: 71,581
- Referee: Carl Cheffers
- TV announcers (CBS): Ian Eagle and Dan Fouts

Game information

First quarter

- HOU – James Casey 11-yard pass from Matt Schaub (Shayne Graham kick), 11:41. Texans 7–0. Drive: 7 plays, 77 yards, 3:19.
- HOU – Arian Foster 4-yard run (Shayne Graham kick), 0:17. Texans 14–0. Drive: 10 plays, 45 yards, 5:59.

Second quarter

- TEN – Craig Stevens 19-yard pass from Matt Hasselbeck (Rob Bironas kick), 7:52. Texans 14–7. Drive: 7 plays, 78 yards, 4:31.

Third quarter

- HOU – Danieal Manning 55-yard interception return (Shayne Graham kick), 9:21. Texans 21–7.
- HOU – Owen Daniels 28-yard pass from Matt Schaub (Shayne Graham kick), 2:47. Texans 28–7. Drive: 7 plays, 75 yards, 2:37.

Fourth quarter

- HOU – Shayne Graham 33-yard field goal, 5:38. Texans 31–7. Drive: 4 plays, 3 yards, 1:32.
- HOU – Kareem Jackson 63-yard interception return (Shayne Graham kick), 3:57. Texans 38–7.
- TEN – Kendall Wright 11-yard pass from Matt Hasselbeck (Rob Bironas kick), 0:57. Texans 38–14. Drive: 10 plays, 79 yards, 3:00.

Top passers

- TEN – Matt Hasselbeck – 17/25, 193 yards, 2 TD, 2 INT
- HOU – Matt Schaub – 20/28, 202 yards, 2 TD

Top rushers

- TEN – Chris Johnson – 25 rushes, 141 yards
- HOU – Arian Foster – 24 rushes, 86 yards, TD

Top receivers

- TEN – Kendall Wright – 4 receptions, 46 yards, TD
- HOU – Owen Daniels – 6 receptions, 72 yards, TD

Despite Chris Johnson breaking out with his first 100+ yard rushing game for the Titans this season, Tennessee was unable to contain a dynamic Texans team, who recorded two touchdowns on defense en route to blowout the former Oilers 38–14. With the win, the Texans improved to 4–0 for the first time in franchise history. On the opening drive of the game, Matt Schuab threw an 11-yard touchdown to make it 7–0. 2 drives later, Arian Foster scored a touchdown of 4 yards to make it 14–0 at the end of the first. Tennessee got going in the second with a 19-yard touchdown making it 14–7. That was the score at the half. In the third Matt Hasselbeck dropped back but was picked of by Danieal Manning and returned for a touchdown making it 21–7. On Houston's next drive, Schuab threw a 28-yard touchdown to Owen Daniels to make it 28–7 at the end of the third. In the fourth Tennessee fumbled giving it to Houston who took a 31–7 lead. Tennessee then threw an interception returned 63 yards for a touchdown. It was 38–7. Tennessee scored late in the game to make it 38–14 and that was the final score.

==== Week 5: at New York Jets ====
Week Five: Houston Texans at New York Jets – Game summary

Quarter	1	2	3	4	Total
Texans	7	10	6	0	23
Jets	7	0	7	3	17

at MetLife Stadium, East Rutherford, New Jersey

- Date: October 8
- Game time: 8:30 p.m. EDT/7:30 p.m. CDT
- Game weather: 52 °F (11 °C), partly cloudy
- Game attendance: 79,088
- Referee: Scott Green
- TV announcers (ESPN): Mike Tirico, Jon Gruden and Lisa Salters

Game information

First quarter

- HOU – Owen Daniels 34-yard pass from Matt Schaub (Shayne Graham kick), 11:05. Texans 7–0. Drive: 8 plays, 85 yards, 3:55.
- NYJ – Jeff Cumberland 27-yard pass from Mark Sanchez (Nick Folk kick), 4:07. Tied 7–7. Drive: 4 plays, 57 yards, 1:47.

Second quarter

- HOU – Arian Foster 13-yard run (Shayne Graham kick), 11:11. Texans 14–7. Drive: 5 plays, 67 yards, 2:45.
- HOU – Shayne Graham 27-yard field goal, 0:00. Texans 17–7. Drive: 3 plays, 0 yards, 0:14.

Third quarter

- HOU – Shayne Graham 42-yard field goal, 4:51. Texans 20–7. Drive: 14 plays, 70 yards, 7:42.
- NYJ – Joe McKnight 100-yard kickoff return (Nick Folk kick), 4:38. Texans 20–14.
- HOU – Shayne Graham 22-yard field goal, 0:13. Texans 23–14. Drive: 8 plays, 42 yards, 4:25.

Fourth quarter

- NYJ – Nick Folk 21-yard field goal, 0:15. Texans 23–17. Drive: 8 plays, 69 yards, 3:18.

Top passers

- HOU – Matt Schaub – 14/28, 209 yards, TD, INT
- NYJ – Mark Sanchez – 14/31, 230 yards, TD, 2 INT

Top rushers

- HOU – Arian Foster – 29 rushes, 152 yards, TD
- NYJ – Shonn Greene – 8 rushes, 26 yards

Top receivers

- HOU – Owen Daniels – 4 receptions, 79 yards, TD
- NYJ – Jeremy Kerley – 5 receptions, 94 yards

Many expected the Texans to roll through the seemingly dismal Jets team in their first primetime appearance of the season. Even though the Texans never trailed in the game, the Jets kept pace throughout, thanks in large part to a 100-yard kickoff return touchdown by the Jets' Joe McKnight. The Texans were able to keep the Jets at bay just enough to earn a hard-fought win on the road, and improve to 5–0, remaining one of only two teams undefeated in the NFL to this point along with the Atlanta Falcons. This was also the first time the Texans have ever defeated the New York Jets in their 11-year history, making them 1–5 against the Jets overall and improving their regular season record to 5–0. On the opening drive Houston scored to take a 7–0 lead. Houston got the ball but was intercepted at their own 35. Mark Sanchez threw a touchdown to Josh Cumberland to make it 7–7. In the second, Arian Foster scored to make it 14–7. A Shayne Graham field goal made it 17–7 at the half. Houston would kick another field goal to make it 20–7. The ensuing kickoff was returned by Joe McKnight 100 yards to make it 20–14. Another Houston field goal made it 23–14. The Jets would get a field goal before the game ended to end it 23–17 Houston. The Texans improved to 5–0.

==== Week 6: vs. Green Bay Packers ====
Week Six: Green Bay Packers at Houston Texans – Game summary

Quarter	1	2	3	4	Total
Packers	14	7	7	14	42
Texans	0	10	7	7	24

at Reliant Stadium, Houston, Texas

- Date: October 14
- Game time: 7:20 p.m. CDT
- Game weather: Played indoors (retractable roof closed)
- Game attendance: 71,702
- Referee: Jerome Boger
- TV announcers (NBC): Al Michaels, Cris Collinsworth and Michele Tafoya

Game information

First quarter

- GB – Jordy Nelson 41-yard pass from Aaron Rodgers (Mason Crosby kick), 11:34. Packers 7–0. Drive: 7 plays, 62 yards, 2:04.
- GB – James Jones 6-yard pass from Aaron Rodgers (Mason Crosby kick), 0:24. Packers 14–0. Drive: 6 plays, 56 yards, 2:22.

Second quarter

- HOU – Arian Foster 1-yard run (Shayne Graham kick), 10:13. Packers 14–7. Drive: 10 plays, 54 yards, 5:11.
- GB – Jordy Nelson 21-yard pass from Aaron Rodgers (Mason Crosby kick), 6:45. Packers 21–7. Drive: 7 plays, 78 yards, 3:28.
- HOU – Shayne Graham 51-yard field goal, 2:15. Packers 21–10. Drive: 8 plays, 49 yards, 4:30.

Third quarter

- GB – Jordy Nelson 1-yard pass from Aaron Rodgers (Mason Crosby kick), 8:16. Packers 28–10. Drive: 16 plays, 59 yards, 6:44.
- HOU – Arian Foster 1-yard run (Shayne Graham kick), 0:17. Packers 28–17. Drive: 9 plays, 65 yards, 3:48.

Fourth quarter

- GB – Tom Crabtree 48-yard pass from Aaron Rodgers (Mason Crosby kick), 14:46. Packers 35–17. Drive: 3 plays, 57 yards, 0:31.
- GB – James Jones 18-yard pass from Aaron Rodgers (Mason Crosby kick), 12:16. Packers 42–17. Drive: 4 plays, 27 yards, 2:18.
- HOU – DeVier Posey blocked punt recovered in end zone (Shayne Graham kick), 5:30. Packers 42–24.

Top passers

- GB – Aaron Rodgers – 24/37, 338 Yards, 6 TD
- HOU – Matt Schaub – 20/33, 232 Yards, 2 INT

Top rushers

- GB – Alex Green – 22 rushes, 65 Yards
- HOU – Justin Forsett – 7 rushes, 47 Yards

Top receivers

- GB – Jordy Nelson – 9 receptions, 121 Yards, 3 TD
- HOU – Andre Johnson – 8 receptions, 75 Yards

The Texans came into their first ever appearance on Sunday Night Football facing playoff favorites Green Bay, who had shockingly started the season 2–3, one of those losses ending in controversy. And coming off another disappointing loss to Indianapolis the week before, the Green Bay Packers took out all of their early season frustrations out on the Texans at Reliant Stadium, and at the same time, reestablished themselves as the team to beat in the NFC. Aaron Rodgers tore up the Texans defense with 6 touchdown passes, and the Packers as the Texans dropped to 5–1 and 0–1 on Sunday Night Football. On the second drive of the game, Aaron Rodgers threw a touchdown to Jordy Nelson to make it 7–0. A few drives later it was 14–0 on a Rodgers to Jones touchdown. Houston scored 1 drive later on an Arian Foster touchdown run to make it 14–7. Then Rodgers hit Jordy Nelson to make it 21–7. Before the half ended, Houston got a field goal to make it 21–10 at the half. Mason Crosby made a field goal but was nullified by Houston being offsides. Rodgers then hit Nelson to make it 28–10. Foster scored again to make it 28–17. On the next drive, Rodgers found Tom Crabtree to make it 35–17. After a Texan interception, Rodgers found James Jones again to make it 42–17. Houston scored before the buzzer to have the final score 42–24.

==== Week 7: vs. Baltimore Ravens ====
Battle Red Day

Week Seven: Baltimore Ravens at Houston Texans – Game summary

Quarter	1	2	3	4	Total
Ravens	3	0	7	3	13
Texans	9	20	7	7	43

at Reliant Stadium, Houston, Texas

- Date: October 21
- Game time: 12:00 p.m. CDT
- Game weather: Played indoors (retractable roof closed)
- Game attendance: 71,708
- Referee: Tony Corrente
- TV announcers (CBS): Greg Gumbel and Dan Dierdorf

Game information

First quarter

- BAL – Justin Tucker 51-yard field goal, 10:57. Ravens 3–0. Drive: 8 plays, 45 yards, 2:41.
- HOU – Joe Flacco sacked by Connor Barwin in end zone for SAFETY, 4:49. Ravens 3–2.
- HOU – Kevin Walter 25-yard pass from Matt Schaub (Shayne Graham kick), 0:30. Texans 9–3. Drive: 8 plays, 66 yards, 4:19.

Second quarter

- HOU – Johnathan Joseph 52-yard interception return (Shayne Graham kick), 14:51. Texans 16–3.
- HOU – Owen Daniels 1-yard pass from Matt Schaub (Shayne Graham kick), 5:58. Texans 23–3. Drive: 7 plays, 79 yards, 3:14.
- HOU – Shayne Graham 33-yard field goal, 1:57. Texans 26–3. Drive: 8 plays, 40 yards, 3:28.
- HOU – Shayne Graham 29-yard field goal, 0:03. Texans 29–3. Drive: 12 plays, 58 yards, 1:03.

Third quarter

- BAL – Tandon Doss 15-yard pass from Joe Flacco (Justin Tucker kick), 10:36. Texans 29–10. Drive: 5 plays, 47 yards, 1:20.
- HOU – Arian Foster 1-yard run (Shayne Graham kick), 2:56. Texans 36–10. Drive: 12 plays, 79 yards, 7:40.

Fourth quarter

- BAL – Justin Tucker 54-yard field goal, 12:23. Texans 36–13. Drive: 14 plays, 22 yards, 5:33.
- HOU – Arian Foster 2-yard run (Shayne Graham kick), 8:48. Texans 43–13. Drive: 6 plays, 44 yards, 3:35.

Top passers

- BAL – Joe Flacco – 21/43, 147 yards, TD, 2 INT
- HOU – Matt Schaub – 23/37, 256 yards, 2 TD

Top rushers

- BAL – Ray Rice – 9 rushes, 42 yards
- HOU – Arian Foster – 19 rushes, 98 yards, 2 TD

Top receivers

- BAL – Torrey Smith – 4 receptions, 41 yards
- HOU – Andre Johnson – 9 receptions, 86 yards

The Texans had little time to think about the disappointing results the week before at home against Green Bay, as the Baltimore Ravens, the team who had eliminated them in the divisional round of the playoffs the previous year, were coming to town. The Texans rebounded from their worst performance of the year with arguably one of their best as they had limited Baltimore's revitalized offense to just 13, forcing two turnovers in an impressive win going into the bye week. It was the first time the Texans had ever defeated the Ravens in their franchise history (they had lost the previous six meetings, including the playoff matchup). Reliant Stadium set a new Texans home attendance record of 71,708 fans during the regular season. Likewise, the Ravens and Texans were the only 2 teams in the AFC who were above .500 at the point of this game. However, the Texans surprisingly won it as the team went into their bye week at 6–1 and also went 1–6 all-time against the Ravens. The Texans punted to the Ravens who kicked a field goal to take a 3–0 lead. 3 drives later, Joe Flacco was sacked in his own endzone. That gave Houston 2 points and the ball. It was 3–2. Matt Schuab found Kevin Walters to make it 9–3 at the end of the first. Then Flacco was picked off at the Houston 48. Jonathan Joseph ran it back 52 yards for a touchdown to make it 16–3. On the next drive, Schuab found Owen Daniels to make it 23–3. Randy Bullock kicked 2 field goals to make it 29–3 at the half. Flacco found Tandon Doss to make it 29–10. Then Arian Foster scored to make it 36–10. Justin Tucker kicked a field goal to make it 36–13. Then Arian Foster ran in for the final score of the game making it 43–13.

==== Week 9: vs. Buffalo Bills ====
Week Nine: Buffalo Bills at Houston Texans – Game summary

Quarter	1	2	3	4	Total
Bills	0	6	3	0	9
Texans	7	0	7	7	21

at Reliant Stadium, Houston, Texas

- Date: November 4
- Game time: 12:00 p.m. CST
- Game weather: Played indoors (retractable roof closed)
- Game attendance: 71,698
- Referee: Bill Vinovich
- TV announcers (CBS): Ian Eagle and Dan Fouts

Game information

First quarter

- HOU – Owen Daniels 39-yard pass from Matt Schaub (Shayne Graham kick), 0:36. Texans 7–0. Drive: 4 plays, 77 yards, 2:00.

Second quarter

- BUF – Rian Lindell 22-yard field goal, 1:42. Texans 7–3. Drive: 10 plays, 60 yards, 4:40.
- BUF – Rian Lindell 38-yard field goal, 0:05. Texans 7–6. Drive: 6 plays, 47 yards, 0:47.

Third quarter

- HOU – Arian Foster 3-yard run (Shayne Graham kick), 12:11. Texans 14–6. Drive: 5 plays, 43 yards, 2:16.
- BUF – Rian Lindell 39-yard field goal, 7:41. Texans 14–9. Drive: 9 plays, 56 yards, 4:30.

Fourth quarter

- HOU – Garrett Graham 5-yard TD pass from Matt Schaub (Shayne Graham kick), 11:25. Texans 21–9. Drive: 11 plays, 68 yards, 6:30.

Top passers

- BUF – Ryan Fitzpatrick – 25/38, 239 yards
- HOU – Matt Schaub – 19/27, 268 yards, 2 TD

Top rushers

- BUF – C. J. Spiller – 6 rushes, 39 yards
- HOU – Arian Foster – 24 rushes, 111 yards

Top receivers

- BUF – Donald Jones – 6 receptions, 65 yards
- HOU – Andre Johnson – 8 receptions, 118 yards

The game marked the anticipated return of former Texans number one draft pick Mario Williams, who had signed a multi-year $100 million contract with the Bills over the offseason, back to Reliant Stadium. While Williams performed well in his return, the Bills were unable to muster up a touchdown drive over the Texans defense as Houston improved to 7–1 with a 21–9 win. Also, the team took the all-time series to .500 with a 3–3 record against the Bills. Houston scored first on a 39-yard touchdown to make it 7–0. After 2 straight missed field goals by both teams, the Bills made one to cut it to 7–3. Buffalo got another field goal to make it 7–6 at the half. In the 3rd, Arian Foster scored to make it 14–6. Late in the 3rd, Buffalo made another field goal to make it 14–9. Schuab found Garrett Graham to make the final score 21–9. Houston improved to 7–1.

==== Week 10: at Chicago Bears ====
Week Ten: Houston Texans at Chicago Bears – Game summary

Quarter	1	2	3	4	Total
Texans	3	7	0	3	13
Bears	0	3	3	0	6

at Soldier Field, Chicago, Illinois

- Date: November 11
- Game time: 7:20 p.m. CST
- Game weather: 54 °F (12 °C), rain
- Game attendance: 62,410
- Referee: Gene Steratore
- TV announcers (NBC): Al Michaels, Cris Collinsworth and Michele Tafoya

Game information

First quarter

- HOU – Shayne Graham 20-yard field goal, 8:13. Texans 3–0. Drive: 10 plays, 56 yards, 4:55.

Second quarter

- CHI – Robbie Gould 51-yard field goal, 12:52. Tied 3–3. Drive: 4 plays, 5 yards, 1:22.
- HOU – Arian Foster 2-yard pass from Matt Schaub (Shayne Graham kick), 4:14. Texans 10–3. Drive: 7 plays, 66 yards, 3:17.

Third quarter

- CHI – Robbie Gould 24-yard field goal, 1:55. Texans 10–6. Drive: 6 plays, 46 yards, 3:20.

Fourth quarter

- HOU – Shayne Graham 42-yard field goal, 4:49. Texans 13–6. Drive: 6 plays, 29 yards, 3:45.

Top passers

- HOU – Matt Schaub – 14/26, 95 yards, TD, 2 INT
- CHI – Jason Campbell – 11/19, 94 yards

Top rushers

- HOU – Arian Foster – 29 rushes, 102 yards
- CHI – Matt Forte – 16 rushes, 39 yards

Top receivers

- HOU – Andre Johnson – 4 receptions, 35 yards
- CHI – Brandon Marshall – 8 receptions, 107 yards

The Texans visited the Bears in what was, at the time, dubbed a potential Super Bowl preview. Both teams were 7–1 heading into the Sunday night tilt.

The primetime game was played in a mix of rain and snow at Soldier Field, conditions that have typically meant trouble for teams that play their home games in warm weather or controlled environments, such as the Texans. Despite the conditions, the Texans were able to grind out a 13–6 win on the road to improve to 8–1 on the season, 3–0 overall against the Chicago Bears and 1–1 on Sunday Night Football. On their 2nd drive of the game, Houston kicked a field goal to make it 3–0. After that, 4 straight turnovers occurred;2 for each team. After the last turnover, Chicago drove down the field and kicked it through to make it 3–3. Houston then had Matt Schuab throw it to Arian Foster to make it 10–3. Chicago then threw an interception at the end of the half. In the middle of the 3rd quarter, Robbie Gould kicked it through to cut it to 10–6. In the 4th, Houston kicked a field goal to make it 13–6. Chicago turned it over to end the game. The Texans improved to 8–1.

==== Week 11: vs. Jacksonville Jaguars ====
Week Eleven: Jacksonville Jaguars at Houston Texans – Game summary

Quarter	1	2	3	4	OT	Total
Jaguars	7	10	10	7	3	37
Texans	7	10	3	14	9	43

at Reliant Stadium, Houston, Texas

- Date: November 18
- Game time: 12:00 p.m. CST
- Game weather: Played indoors (retractable roof closed)
- Game attendance: 71,676
- Referee: Clete Blakeman
- TV announcers (CBS): Bill Macatee and Steve Tasker

Game information

First quarter

- HOU – Keshawn Martin 9-yard pass from Matt Schaub (Shayne Graham kick), 12:15. Texans 7–0. Drive: 5 plays, 83 yards, 2:45.
- JAC – Marcedes Lewis 13-yard TD pass from Chad Henne (Josh Scobee kick), 2:56. Tied 7–7. Drive: 4 plays, 81 yards, 1:32.

Second quarter

- JAC – Cecil Shorts 67-yard pass from Chad Henne (Josh Scobee kick), 12:31. Jaguars 14–7. Drive: 4 plays, 81 yards, 2:16.
- HOU – James Casey 1-yard pass from Matt Schaub (Shayne Graham kick), 7:52. Tied 14–14. Drive: 8 plays, 48 yards, 4:39.
- JAC – Josh Scobee 43-yard field goal, 2:53. Jaguars 17–14. Drive: 8 plays, 44 yards, 4:59.
- HOU – Shayne Graham 42-yard field goal, 1:12. Tied 17–17. Drive: 3 plays, 7 yards, 1:41.

Third quarter

- JAC – Josh Scobee 40-yard field goal, 11:01. Jaguars 20–17. Drive: 8 plays, 58 yards, 3:59.
- JAC – Marcedes Lewis 1-yard pass from Chad Henne (Josh Scobee kick), 6:52. Jaguars 27–17. Drive: 5 plays, 11 yards, 2:39.
- HOU – Shayne Graham 27-yard field goal, 2:15. Jaguars 27–20. Drive: 9 plays, 65 yards, 4:37.

Fourth quarter

- JAC – Justin Blackmon 81-yard pass from Chad Henne (Josh Scobee kick), 12:33. Jaguars 34–20. Drive: 3 plays, 70 yards, 1:23.
- HOU – Garrett Graham 1-yard pass from Matt Schaub (Shayne Graham kick), 5:39. Jaguars 34–27. Drive: 14 plays, 61 yards, 6:54.
- HOU – Garrett Graham 5-yard pass from Matt Schaub (Shayne Graham kick), 1:34. Tied 34–34. Drive: 8 plays, 89 yards, 2:18.

Overtime

- HOU – Shayne Graham 25-yard field goal, 8:10. Texans 37–34. Drive: 14 plays, 73 yards, 6:50.
- JAC – Josh Scobee 33-yard field goal, 4:21. Tied 37–37. Drive: 11 plays, 53 yards, 3:49.
- HOU – Andre Johnson 48-yard pass from Matt Schaub, 2:01. Texans 43–37. Drive: 2 plays, 53 yards, 0:20.

Top passers

- JAC – Chad Henne – 16/33, 354 yards, 4 TD
- HOU – Matt Schaub – 43/55, 527 yards, 5 TD, 2 INT

Top rushers

- JAC – Jalen Parmele – 24 rushes, 80 yards
- HOU – Arian Foster – 28 rushes, 77 yards

Top receivers

- JAC – Justin Blackmon – 7 receptions, 236 yards, TD
- HOU – Andre Johnson – 14 receptions, 273 yards, TD

After a hard-fought win in Chicago, and on the cusp of a short turnaround for a Thursday afternoon matchup in Detroit the following week, the 8–1 Texans hosted the 1–8 Jaguars at Reliant. The Texans survived an upset scare from Jacksonville thanks to a career-high 527 passing yards from Matt Schaub and 275 receiving yards from Andre Johnson. Notably, the Texans became the first NFL team to score twice in an overtime period under the new overtime format. To open the game Matt Schaub found Keshawn Martin to make it 7–0. Then Chad Henne found Marcedes Lewis to make it 7–7. After a Texan punt, Henne found Cecil Shorts III to make it 14–7. Schaub then hit Jurrell Casey to tie it at 14. Both teams made field goals and it was 17–17 at the half. The Jaguars made a field goal to make it 20–17. After another Texan fumble, Henne found Marcedes Lewis to make it 27–17. A field goal cut it to 27–20. Then Schaub threw a pick. Henne then threw an 81-yard touchdown to Justin Blackmon to make it 34–20. The Texans answered right back with an Arian Foster td to make it 34–27. After a punt, Schaub found Garrett Graham to make it 34–34. With 5 seconds left, Randy Bullock missed a 47 yarder that could have won the game. In overtime, both teams made field goals to make it 37–37. Jacksonville had a chance to win after Houston threw an interception but they couldn't convert 4th down. With 2:10 left in overtime, Schaub threw a 48-yard touchdown pass to Andre Johnson to win 43–37. With the win, the Texans improved to 9–1 as the team swept the Jaguars. Schaub's 527 passing yards tied with Warren Moon for the second most in a single game performance.

==== Week 12: at Detroit Lions ====
Thanksgiving Day game

Week Twelve: Houston Texans at Detroit Lions – Game summary

Quarter	1	2	3	4	OT	Total
Texans	0	14	10	7	3	34
Lions	7	14	3	7	0	31

at Ford Field, Detroit, Michigan

- Date: November 22
- Game time: 12:30 p.m. EST/11:30 a.m. CST
- Game weather: None (played indoors)
- Game attendance: 64,827
- Referee: Walt Coleman
- TV announcers (CBS): Jim Nantz and Phil Simms

Game information

First quarter

- DET – Mikel Leshoure 2-yard run (Jason Hanson kick), 9:58. Lions 7–0. Drive: 12 plays, 80 yards, 5:02.

Second quarter

- HOU – Arian Foster 6-yard run (Shayne Graham kick), 10:57. Tied 7–7. Drive: 7 plays, 74 yards, 3:42.
- DET – Mike Thomas 5-yard pass from Matthew Stafford (Jason Hanson kick), 6:00. Lions 14–7. Drive: 10 plays, 83 yards, 4:57.
- HOU – Owen Daniels 9-yard pass from Matt Schaub (Shayne Graham kick), 2:11. Tied 14–14. Drive: 8 plays, 75 yards, 3:49.
- DET – Calvin Johnson 22-yard pass from Matthew Stafford (Jason Hanson kick), 1:49. Lions 21–14. Drive: 2 plays, 59 yards, 0:22.

Third quarter

- DET – Jason Hanson 46-yard field goal, 7:03. Lions 24–14. Drive: 12 plays, 50 yards, 6:28.
- HOU – Justin Forsett 81-yard run (Shayne Graham kick), 6:35. Lions 24–21. Drive: 2 plays, 81 yards, 0:28.
- HOU – Shayne Graham 45-yard field goal, 2:36. Tied 24–24. Drive: 7 plays, 40 yards, 3:00.

Fourth quarter

- DET – Joique Bell 23-yard run (Jason Hanson kick), 13:31. Lions 31–24. Drive: 8 plays, 67 yards, 4:05.
- HOU – Arian Foster 1-yard run (Shayne graham kick), 1:55. Tied 31–31. Drive: 15 plays, 97 yards, 5:43.

Overtime

- HOU – Shayne Graham 32-yard field goal, 2:21. Texans 34–31. Drive: 6 plays, 49 yards, 2:11.

Top passers

- HOU – Matt Schaub – 29/48, 315 yards, TD, INT
- DET – Matthew Stafford – 31/61, 441 yards, 2 TD

Top rushers

- HOU – Arian Foster – 20 rushes, 102 yards, 2 TD
- DET – Joique Bell – 5 rushes, 47 yards, TD

Top receivers

- HOU – Andre Johnson – 9 receptions, 188 yards
- DET – Calvin Johnson – 8 receptions, 140 yards, TD

After defeating the Jaguars at home in overtime, the Texans traveled to Detroit to play in their first ever Thanksgiving Day game. Many touchdowns were scored between both of the teams, but the Texans got the better edge of it when Justin Forsett ran for a controversial touchdown from deep in the Texans' territory. With their 2nd-straight overtime victory, the Texans improved to 10–1, 1–0 on Thanksgiving, and 2–1 against the Lions all-time. Mikel Leshore of Detroit struck first to make it 7–0. In the 2nd, Arian Foster scored to make it 7–7. Mike Thomas caught to make it 14–7 Detroit. Matt Schaub then hit Owen Daniels to make it 14–14. 2 plays later Calvin Johnson caught it to make it 21–14 Lions at the half. Jason Hanson made one to make it 24–14. Then Justin Forsett scored on an 81-yard run that clearly showed that Forsett was down by contact, but was illegally challenged; it made it 24–21. Shayne Graham would follow suit with a 45-yard FG to tie it at 24, but Detroit would retake the lead early in the 4th quarter with a Joique Bell 23-yard TD run to make the score 31–24. Foster scored his 2nd TD late in regulation to tie the game at 31. The Texans got the last laugh as Graham would nail the 32-yard game-winner with 2:21 left in overtime to win the game 34–31.

==== Week 13: at Tennessee Titans ====
Week Thirteen: Houston Texans at Tennessee Titans – Game summary

Quarter	1	2	3	4	Total
Texans	14	7	3	0	24
Titans	3	0	7	0	10

at LP Field, Nashville, Tennessee

- Date: December 2
- Game time: 12:00 p.m. CST
- Game weather: 66 °F (19 °C), cloudy
- Game attendance: 69,143
- Referee: Tony Corrente
- TV announcers (CBS): Kevin Harlan and Solomon Wilcots

Game information

First quarter

- HOU – Lestar Jean 54-yard pass from Matt Schaub (Shayne Graham kick), 12:29. Texans 7–0. Drive: 6 plays, 80 yards, 2:31.
- TEN – Rob Bironas 37-yard field goal, 9:30. Texans 7–3. Drive: 7 plays, 59 yards, 2:59.
- HOU – James Casey 5-yard pass from Matt Schaub (Shayne Graham kick), 0:19. Texans 14–3. Drive: 5 plays, 20 yards, 1:48.

Second quarter:

- HOU – Arian Foster 2-yard run (Shayne Graham kick), 7:48. Texans 21–3. Drive: 2 plays, 3 yards, 0:47.

Third quarter

- HOU – Shayne Graham 50-yard field goal, 6:54. Texans 24–3. Drive: 4 plays, 4 yards, 2:07.
- TEN – Kenny Britt 34-yard pass from Jake Locker (Rob Bironas kick), 1:34. Texans 24–14. Drive: 4 plays, 80 yards, 1:45.

Fourth quarter

- No scoring plays

Top passers

- HOU – Matt Schaub – 21/35, 207 yards, 2 TD
- TEN – Jake Locker – 29/45, 309 yards, TD, 3 INT

Top rushers

- HOU – Justin Forsett – 14 rushes, 64 yards
- TEN – Chris Johnson – 13 rushes, 51 yards

Top receivers

- HOU – Andre Johnson – 5 receptions, 56 yards
- TEN – Nate Washington – 3 receptions, 96 yards

After a grueling stretch where they endured two hard-fought overtime matches over a span of 5 days, the Texans took the opportunity of a prolonged week to heal up and rest in advance of the stretch run to the playoffs. The Texans took the AFC's best record into Tennessee to face a reeling Titans team, fresh off of firing their offensive coordinator earlier in the week. The Texans staked out to an early lead and never looked back as the defense forced 6 Titans turnovers and held Titans running back Chris Johnson to 51 yards en route to a relatively stress free 24–10 victory. With the win, the Texans set a new team record for wins in a season, while improving to 11–1 and also clinched the franchise's second straight trip to the playoffs and swept the Titans for the first time since 2004.

==== Week 14: at New England Patriots ====
Week Fourteen: Houston Texans at New England Patriots – Game summary

Quarter	1	2	3	4	Total
Texans	0	0	7	7	14
Patriots	14	7	7	14	42

at Gillette Stadium, Foxborough, Massachusetts

- Date: December 10
- Game time: 8:30 p.m. EST/7:30 p.m. CST
- Game weather: 59 °F (15 °C), rainy and warm
- Game attendance: 68,756
- Referee: Terry McAulay
- TV announcers (ESPN): Mike Tirico, Jon Gruden and Lisa Salters

Game information

First quarter

- NE – Aaron Hernandez 7-yard pass from Tom Brady (Stephen Gostkowski kick), 9:27. Patriots 7–0. Drive: 7 plays, 59 yards, 3:12.
- NE – Brandon Lloyd 37-yard pass from Tom Brady (Stephen Gostkowski kick), 2:49. Patriots 14–0. Drive: 6 plays, 82 yards, 2:41.

Second quarter

- NE – Aaron Hernandez 4-yard pass from Tom Brady (Stephen Gostkowski kick), 11:01. Patriots 21–0. Drive: 8 plays, 70 yards, 3:59.

Third quarter

- NE – Donte Stallworth 63-yard pass from Tom Brady (Stephen Gostkowski kick), 9:49. Patriots 28–0. Drive: 5 plays, 74 yards, 1:05.
- HOU – Arian Foster 1-yard run (Shayne Graham kick), 6:12. Patriots 28–7. Drive: 7 plays, 88 yards, 3:37.

Fourth quarter

- NE – Brandon Lloyd fumble recovery in end zone (Stephen Gostkowski kick), 14:15. Patriots 35–7. Drive: 9 plays, 45 yards, 4:13.
- NE – Stevan Ridley 14-yard run (Stephen Gostkowski kick), 7:23. Patriots 42–7. Drive: 10 plays, 68 yards, 4:24.
- HOU – T. J. Yates 1-yard run (Shayne Graham kick), 2:00. Patriots 42–14. Drive: 6 plays, 25 yards, 1:01.

Top passers

- HOU – Matt Schaub – 19/32, 232 yards, INT
- NE – Tom Brady – 21/35, 296 yards, 4 TD

Top rushers

- HOU – Arian Foster – 15 rushes, 46 yards, TD
- NE – Stevan Ridley – 18 rushes, 72 yards, TD

Top receivers

- HOU – Andre Johnson – 8 receptions, 95 yards
- NE – Brandon Lloyd – 7 receptions, 89 yards, TD

The Texans were thoroughly outplayed in what would turn out to be a preview of the divisional round rematch between both teams. The Texans dropped to 11–2 with the loss.

==== Week 15: vs. Indianapolis Colts ====
Week Fifteen: Indianapolis Colts at Houston Texans – Game summary

Quarter	1	2	3	4	Total
Colts	0	10	7	0	17
Texans	10	10	3	6	29

at Reliant Stadium, Houston, Texas

- Date: December 16
- Game time: 12:00 p.m. CST
- Game weather: Played indoors (retractable roof closed)
- Game attendance: 71,702
- Referee: Jeff Triplette
- TV announcers (CBS): Ian Eagle and Dan Fouts

Game information

First quarter

- HOU – Shayne Graham 29-yard field goal, 11:50. Texans 3–0. Drive: 6 plays, 69 yards, 3:13.
- HOU – Andre Johnson 3-yard pass from Matt Schaub (Shayne Graham kick), 4:51. Texans 10–0. Drive: 13 plays, 57 yards, 5:44.

Second quarter

- IND – Adam Vinatieri 26-yard field goal, 6:15. Texans 10–3. Drive: 7 plays, 26 yards, 2:10.
- HOU – Shayne Graham 35-yard field goal, 3:54. Texans 13–3. Drive: 7 plays, 27 yards, 2:22.
- HOU – Bryan Braman 8-yard blocked punt return (Shayne Graham kick), 1:46. Texans 20–3. Drive: 6 plays, 11 yards, 2:04.
- IND – T. Y. Hilton 61-yard pass from Andrew Luck (Adam Vinatieri kick), 1:07. Texans 20–10. Drive: 2 plays, 74 yards, 0:39.

Third quarter

- HOU – Shayne Graham 27-yard field goal, 7:36. Texans 23–10. Drive: 11 plays, 78 yards, 6:20.
- IND – Dwayne Allen 8-yard pass from Andrew Luck (Adam Vinatieri kick), 2:32. Texans 23–17. Drive: 8 plays, 80 yards, 5:01.

Fourth quarter

- HOU – Shayne Graham 46-yard field goal, 8:35. Texans 26–17. Drive: 7 plays, 11 yards, 3:24.
- HOU – Shayne Graham 33-yard field goal, 1:09. Texans 29–17. Drive: 9 plays, 78 yards, 3:40.

Top passers

- IND – Andrew Luck – 13/27, 186 yards, 2 TD
- HOU – Matt Schaub – 23/31, 261 yards, TD

Top rushers

- IND – Vick Ballard – 18 rushes, 105 yards
- HOU – Arian Foster – 27 rushes, 165 yards

Top receivers

- IND – T. Y. Hilton – 3 receptions, 78 yards, TD
- HOU – Andre Johnson – 11 receptions, 151 yards

With their victory over the Colts, the Texans improved to 12–2 on the season and 5–0 against division rivals, thereby securing their second AFC South title in franchise history. Because the Patriots dropped to 10–4 several hours later on the same day, the Texans can clinch homefield advantage throughout the playoffs by winning at least one of their two remaining games by virtue of their head-to-head tiebreaker over the Broncos.

==== Week 16: vs. Minnesota Vikings ====
Week Sixteen: Minnesota Vikings at Houston Texans – Game summary

Quarter	1	2	3	4	Total
Vikings	7	6	3	7	23
Texans	3	0	3	0	6

at Reliant Stadium, Houston, Texas

- Date: December 23
- Game time: 12:00 p.m. CST
- Game weather: Played indoors (retractable roof closed)
- Game attendance: 71,688
- Referee: John Parry
- TV announcers (Fox): Chris Myers, Tim Ryan and Jaime Maggio

Game information

First quarter

- HOU – Shayne Graham 51-yard field goal, 10:55. Texans 3–0. Drive: 9 plays, 46 yards, 4:10.
- MIN – Kyle Rudolph 3-yard pass from Christian Ponder (Blair Walsh kick), 6:19. Vikings 7–3. Drive: 8 plays, 78 yards, 4:31.

Second quarter

- MIN – Blair Walsh 56-yard field goal, 8:20. Vikings 10–3. Drive: 12 plays, 41 yards, 5:21.
- MIN – Blair Walsh 41-yard field goal, 0:41. Vikings 13–3. Drive: 5 plays, 21 yards, 1:02.

Third quarter

- MIN – Blair Walsh 39-yard field goal, 11:35. Vikings 16–3. Drive: 9 plays, 37 yards, 3:29.
- HOU – Shayne Graham 33-yard field goal, 0:30. Vikings 16–6. Drive: 11 plays, 46 yards, 5:17.

Fourth quarter

- MIN – Toby Gerhart 3-yard run (Blair Walsh kick), 4:44. Vikings 23–6. Drive: 10 plays, 13 yards, 6:01.

Top passers

- MIN – Christian Ponder – 16/30, 174 yards, TD
- HOU – Matt Schaub – 18/32, 178 yards

Top rushers

- MIN – Adrian Peterson – 25 rushes, 86 yards
- HOU – Ben Tate – 4 rushes, 17 yards

Top receivers

- MIN – Jarius Wright – 5 receptions, 53 yards
- HOU – Andre Johnson – 7 receptions, 97 yards

With the loss in their regular season home finale, the Texans dropped to 12–3 on the season and 6–2 at home, finishing 0–2 at home against NFC North teams.

As of 2024, Houston remains winless (0–6) against the Minnesota Vikings in franchise history.

==== Week 17: at Indianapolis Colts ====
Week Seventeen: Indianapolis Colts at Houston Texans – Game summary

Quarter	1	2	3	4	Total
Texans	3	3	10	0	16
Colts	7	7	7	7	28

at Lucas Oil Stadium, Indianapolis, Indiana

- Date: December 30
- Game time: 1:00 p.m. EST/12:00 p.m. CST
- Game weather: Played indoors (retractable roof closed)
- Game attendance: 66,957
- Referee: Clete Blakeman
- TV announcers (CBS): Greg Gumbel and Dan Dierdorf

Game information

First quarter

- IND – Coby Fleener 1-yard pass from Andrew Luck (Adam Vinatieri kick), 7:51. Colts 7–0. Drive: 13 plays, 75 yards, 7:09.
- HOU – Shayne Graham 51-yard field goal, 0:12. Colts 7–3. Drive: 14 plays, 48 yards, 7:45.

Second quarter

- HOU – Shayne Graham 37-yard field goal, 10:27. Colts 7–6. Drive: 5 plays, 44 yards, 2:28.
- IND – Vick Ballard 1-yard run (Adam Vinatieri kick), 2:00. Colts 14–6. Drive: 6 plays, 39 yards, 2:05.

Third quarter

- HOU – Arian Foster 13-yard run (Shayne Graham kick), 9:25. Colts 14–13. Drive: 12 plays, 84 yards, 5:35.
- HOU – Shayne Graham 37-yard field goal, 5:27. Texans 16–14. Drive: 7 plays, 55 yards, 2:28.
- IND – Deji Karim 100-yard kickoff return (Adam Vinatieri kick), 5:10. Colts 21–16.

Fourth quarter

- IND – T. Y. Hilton 80-yard pass from Andrew Luck (Adam Vinatieri kick), 11:22. Colts 28–16. Drive: 3 plays, 57 yards, 1:51.

Top passers

- HOU – Matt Schaub – 24/36, 275 yards, 2 INT
- IND – Andrew Luck – 14/28, 191 yards, 2 TD

Top rushers

- HOU – Arian Foster – 16 rushes, 96 yards, TD
- IND – Vick Ballard – 27 rushes, 78 yards, TD

Top receivers

- HOU – Andre Johnson – 12 receptions, 141 yards
- IND – T. Y. Hilton – 4 receptions, 111 yards, TD

Hoping to rebound from a tough loss, the Texans traveled to Indianapolis for game 2 against the Andrew Luck-led Colts. However, the Texans lost this game and finished 12–4 for the season and 0–11 against the Colts in Indianapolis. With wins by the Broncos and Patriots, the Texans dropped in conference standings, taking the AFC's #3 seed for the 2nd straight year, and would host the Bengals in the wild-card round of the playoffs—also for a 2nd straight year.

=== Postseason ===
==== AFC Wild Card Playoffs: vs. (6) Cincinnati Bengals ====
AFC Wild Card Playoffs: (6) Cincinnati Bengals at (3) Houston Texans – Game summary

Quarter	1	2	3	4	Total
Bengals	0	7	3	3	13
Texans	3	6	7	3	19

at Reliant Stadium, Houston, Texas

- Date: January 5, 2013
- Game time: 3:30 p.m. CST
- Game weather: Played indoors (retractable roof closed)
- Game attendance: 71,738
- Referee: Alberto Riveron
- TV announcers (NBC): Dan Hicks, Mike Mayock and Alex Flanagan

Game information

First quarter

- HOU – Shayne Graham 48-yard field goal, 7:49. Texans 3–0. Drive: 9 plays, 65 yards, 4:19.

Second quarter

- HOU – Shayne Graham 27-yard field goal, 13:07. Texans 6–0. Drive: 12 plays, 49 yards, 7:05.
- CIN – Leon Hall 21-yard interception return (Josh Brown kick), 9:30. Bengals 7–6. Drive: 2 plays, 28 yards, 1:22.
- HOU – Shayne Graham 22-yard field goal, 2:19. Texans 9–7. Drive: 13 plays, 76 yards, 7:05.

Third quarter

- HOU – Arian Foster 1-yard run (Shayne Graham kick), 10:31. Texans 16–7. Drive: 6 plays, 43 yards, 3:20.
- CIN – Josh Brown 34-yard field goal, 7:48. Texans 16–10. Drive: 7 plays, 64 yards, 2:43.

Fourth quarter

- HOU – Shayne Graham 24-yard field goal, 14:17. Texans 19–10. Drive: 8 plays, 30 yards, 3:49.
- CIN – Josh Brown 47-yard field goal, 9:03. Texans 19–13. Drive: 10 plays 32, yards, 5:06.

Top passers

- CIN – Andy Dalton – 14/30, 127 yards, INT
- HOU – Matt Schaub – 29/38, 262 yards, INT

Top rushers

- CIN – BenJarvus Green-Ellis – 11 rushes, 63 yards
- HOU – Arian Foster – 32 rushes, 140 yards, TD

Top receivers

- CIN – A. J. Green – 5 receptions, 80 yards
- HOU – Owen Daniels – 9 receptions, 91 yards

In somewhat of a sloppy game for both teams, the Texans booted the Cincinnati Bengals out of the playoffs for the 2nd straight year and moved on to the divisional round. After going up 6–0 on two Shayne Graham field goals to start the game, Matt Schaub threw an interception that was returned for a touchdown to give the Bengals a 7–6 lead. Coming out of halftime, the Texans defense stiffened up for the rest of the game, forcing the Bengals to 0–9 on 3rd down conversions, holding 2nd-year QB Andy Dalton to 14 completions in 30 attempts for 127 passing yards, and only 2 more field goals as the Texans hung on for the victory.

==== AFC Divisional Playoffs: at (2) New England Patriots ====
AFC Divisional Playoffs: (3) Houston Texans at (2) New England Patriots – Game summary

Quarter	1	2	3	4	Total
Texans	3	10	0	15	28
Patriots	7	10	14	10	41

at Gillette Stadium, Foxborough, Massachusetts

- Date: January 13, 2013
- Game time: 4:30 p.m. EST/3:30 p.m. CST
- Game weather: 51 °F (11 °C), cloudy and mild
- Game attendance: 68,756
- Referee: Tony Corrente
- TV announcers (CBS): Jim Nantz, Phil Simms and Steve Tasker

Game information

First quarter

- HOU – Shayne Graham 27-yard field goal, 14:00. Texans 3–0. Drive: 4 plays, 3 yards, 1:03.
- NE – Shane Vereen 1-yard run (Stephen Gostkowski kick), 1:28. Patriots 7–3. Drive: 6 plays, 65 yards, 3:01.

Second quarter

- NE – Stephen Gostkowski 37-yard field goal, 10:20. Patriots 10–3. Drive: 11 plays, 80 yards, 3:51.
- NE – Shane Vereen 8-yard pass from Tom Brady (Stephen Gostkowski kick), 3:38. Patriots 17–3. Drive: 7 plays, 80 yards, 2:56.
- HOU – Arian Foster 1-yard run (Shayne Graham kick), 1:15. Patriots 17–10. Drive: 5 plays, 47 yards, 2:23.
- HOU – Shayne Graham 55-yard field goal, 0:02. Patriots 17–13. Drive: 5 plays, 26 yards, 0:24.

Third quarter

- NE – Stevan Ridley 8-yard run (Stephen Gostkowski kick), 11:30. Patriots 24–13. Drive: 7 plays, 69 yards, 3:30.
- NE – Brandon Lloyd 5-yard pass from Tom Brady (Stephen Gostkowski kick), 1:21. Patriots 31–13. Drive: 6 plays, 63 yards, 2:53.

Fourth quarter

- NE – Shane Veeren 33-yard pass from Tom Brady (Stephen Gostkowski kick), 13:07. Patriots 38–13. Drive: 1 play, 33 yards, 0:00.
- HOU – DeVier Posey 25-yard pass from Matt Schaub (Shayne Graham kick), 11:35. Patriots 38–20. Drive: 5 plays, 12 yards, 1:32.
- HOU – Arian Foster 1-yard pass from Matt Schaub (Matt Schaub pass to Andre Johnson for two-point conversion), 5:11. Patriots 38–28. Drive: 11 plays, 73 yards, 4:47.
- NE – Stephen Gostkowski 38-yard field goal, 1:18. Patriots 41–28. Drive: 9 plays, 27 yards, 3:57.

Top passers

- HOU – Matt Schaub – 34/51, 343 yards, 2 TD, INT
- NE – Tom Brady – 25/40, 344 yards, 3 TD

Top rushers

- HOU – Arian Foster – 22 rushes, 90 yards, TD
- NE – Stevan Ridley – 15 rushes, 82 yards, TD

Top receivers

- HOU – Andre Johnson – 8 receptions, 95 yards
- NE – Wes Welker – 8 receptions, 131 yards

The Texans were eliminated from the playoffs for the 2nd year in a row in a game reminiscent of the Week 14 matchup against the Patriots. Entering the game, both teams combined were 12–0 at home against other AFC teams. Again, the Texans were outplayed and out-coached, losing despite possessing the ball for about 31:34 minutes compared to their opponent's 28:26. An intercepted pass that doomed a promising drive and a turnover on downs late in the 3rd quarter put the game out of reach as New England ran away with the score, boasting impressive performances from QB Tom Brady, RBs Stevan Ridley and Shane Vereen, and WR Wes Welker.

== Standings ==
=== Division ===
AFC South
	W	L	T	PCT	DIV	CONF	PF	PA	STK
^{(3)} Houston Texans	12	4	0	.750	5–1	10–2	416	331	L2
^{(5)} Indianapolis Colts	11	5	0	.688	4–2	8–4	357	387	W2
Tennessee Titans	6	10	0	.375	1–5	5–7	330	471	W1
Jacksonville Jaguars	2	14	0	.125	2–4	2–10	255	444	L5

=== Conference ===
AFC
#	Team	Division	W	L	T	PCT	DIV	CONF	SOS	SOV	STK
Division winners
1	Denver Broncos	West	13	3	0	.813	6–0	10–2	.457	.385	W11
2 (Note: New England clinched the AFC's No. 2 seed over Houston based on a head-to-head victory.)	New England Patriots	East	12	4	0	.750	6–0	11–1	.496	.466	W2
3	Houston Texans	South	12	4	0	.750	5–1	10–2	.496	.432	L2
4 (Note: Baltimore clinched the AFC North title over Cincinnati based on a better divisional record (4–2 to 3–3).)	Baltimore Ravens	North	10	6	0	.625	4–2	8–4	.496	.438	L1
Wild cards
5	Indianapolis Colts	South	11	5	0	.688	4–2	8–4	.441	.403	W2
6	Cincinnati Bengals	North	10	6	0	.625	3–3	7–5	.438	.381	W3
Did not qualify for the postseason
7	Pittsburgh Steelers	North	8	8	0	.500	3–3	5–7	.465	.438	W1
8 (Note: San Diego finished with a better conference record than Miami (7–5 to 5–7).)	San Diego Chargers	West	7	9	0	.438	4–2	7–5	.457	.286	W2
9	Miami Dolphins	East	7	9	0	.438	2–4	5–7	.500	.415	L1
10 (Note: Tennessee finished ahead of New York Jets based on head-to-head victory.)	Tennessee Titans	South	6	10	0	.375	1–5	5–7	.512	.344	W1
11 (Note: New York Jets finished ahead of Buffalo in the AFC East based on record versus common opponents (5–7 to 3–9).)	New York Jets	East	6	10	0	.375	2–4	4–8	.512	.401	L3
12	Buffalo Bills	East	6	10	0	.375	2–4	5–7	.480	.281	W1
13	Cleveland Browns	North	5	11	0	.313	2–4	5–7	.508	.388	L3
14	Oakland Raiders	West	4	12	0	.250	2–4	4–8	.469	.219	L2
15 (Note: Jacksonville finished with a better conference record than Kansas City (2–10 to 0–12).)	Jacksonville Jaguars	South	2	14	0	.125	2–4	2–10	.539	.531	L5
16	Kansas City Chiefs	West	2	14	0	.125	0–6	0–12	.516	.438	L4
Tiebreakers (Note: When breaking ties for three or more teams under the NFL's rules, they are first broken within divisions, then comparing only the highest ranked remaining team from each division.)

== Statistics ==
=== Team ===
Category	Total yards	Yards per game	NFL rank (out of 32)
Passing offense	3,830	239.4	11th
Rushing offense	2,123	132.7	8th
Total offense	5,953	372.1	7th
Passing defense	3,612	225.8	16th
Rushing defense	1,560	97.5	7th
Total defense	5,172	323.3	7th

=== Individual ===
Category	Player	Total
Offense
Passing yards	Matt Schaub	4,008
Passing touchdowns	Matt Schaub	22
Rushing yards	Arian Foster	1,424
Rushing touchdowns	Arian Foster	15
Receiving yards	Andre Johnson	1,598
Receiving touchdowns	Owen Daniels	6
Defense
Tackles (Solo)	J. J. Watt	69
Sacks	J. J. Watt	20.5
Interceptions	Kareem Jackson	4
