= Chaminade College Preparatory School (California) =

Private Catholic high school in Los Angeles

Chaminade College Preparatory
- Oratio Praeparatoria ad Chaminade College

Location
- 7500 Chaminade Avenue; West Hills, California 91304; United States; 34°12′24″N 118°38′11″W

Information
- Type: Private
- Motto: Per Matrem Ad Filium (Through the Mother To the Son)
- Religious affiliations: Roman Catholic; Marianist
- Established: 1952; 74 years ago
- Oversight: Roman Catholic Archdiocese of Los Angeles
- President: Robert Webb
- Dean: James Milkovitch, Carla Nunneri, & Shawn Huntslinger
- Principal: Luis Guerra
- Staff: 560
- Faculty: 103
- Grades: 9–12
- Gender: Co-educational
- Enrollment: 1,350
- Campus size: 19.67 acres (7.96 ha)
- Campus type: Suburban
- Colors: Orange, navy blue
- Athletics conference: CIF Southern Section; Mission League
- Nickname: Eagles
- Accreditation: Western Association of Schools and Colleges
- Newspaper: The Talon
- Yearbook: Aerie
- Tuition: $23,280 (2023–24) $17,875 (2019–20)
- Website: www.chaminade.org

Middle School Campus

Location
- 19800 Devonshire Street; Los Angeles, California 91311; 34°15′21″N 118°33′54″W

Information
- Founder: Frank J Brick
- President: Robert Webb
- Dean: Sara Shenouda, and Alicia Gonzalez
- Principal: Ryan Halverson
- Faculty: 53 (2014–15)
- Grades: 6–8
- Enrollment: 682 (2014–15)
- Campus size: 16.82 acres (6.81 ha)
- Accreditation: WASC
- Newspaper: Chaminade This Week

Chaminade College Preparatory, formerly Chaminade High School for Boys, is a private Catholic preparatory school with two campuses in San Fernando Valley, Los Angeles County, California.

Named after Society of Mary founder William Joseph Chaminade, Chaminade College Preparatory consists of a middle school (encompassing grades 6–8) located in Chatsworth and a high school (encompassing grades 9–12) located in West Hills. It is located in the Archdiocese of Los Angeles. It is a member of the approved Secondary Schools of the University of California.

Chaminade College Preparatory was recognized as a National Blue Ribbon School in 1998.

== History ==
Originally called Chaminade High School for Boys, Chaminade College Preparatory was founded in 1952 on the former site of the Pacific Military Academy in West Los Angeles by members of the Marianist Province of the Pacific, who were seeking to expand their educational mission into Southern California. The school became nationally famous for the celebrity students who attended the school or came to its dances. The school's mascot name, the Eagles, can be traced to a tower at the school that featured an imposing Army Eagle emblem in tile, with the beak pointed toward the arrows as in wartime.

The high school moved to its current location in West Hills (then part of Canoga Park) in 1961 after the brick buildings of the original campus were deemed unsound. A junior high school serving grades seven to nine was formed in 1967 when the former St. John's Military Academy in Chatsworth was leased by the school, expanding Chaminade's educational program from three to six years. A seventh year was added in 1989 with the addition of a sixth-grade class to the junior high school; the ninth grade was moved to the high school campus that same year to accommodate the addition of the sixth grade to the junior high school, which would then become the middle school. The high school recently added Cesar Chavez Day as a part of their calendar. School is officially out on April 1, 2025.

The school became co-educational in 1972, with the first female graduates in the Class of 1974. Chaminade's two campuses served as the primary locations for the 1976 film The Pom Pom Girls.

== Athletic achievements ==
In 1997, the Chaminade varsity girls' soccer team won its first of four consecutive CIF Championships.

In 1998, the boys' basketball team won its first of two consecutive CIF Championships.

In 2006, the girls' varsity softball team won its first of two consecutive CIF Championships.

In 2006, the varsity lacrosse team won its first CIF Championship.

In 2010, the boys' golf team won CIF.

In 2013, the girls' soccer team won the CIF Southern Section Division I

In 2013, a Chaminade equestrian rode into second place at the Interscholastic Equestrian League.

In 2013, the boys' varsity Football team won the CIF Championship, CIF Regional Championship and CIF State Championship.

In 2014, the boys' varsity basketball team won the CIF state championship.3rd State Crown this season.

In 2014, the boys' varsity fencing team won the California State High School Fencing Championships.

In 2014, the Chaminade wrestling team won four medals at the Mission League Finals. first, second, third, and fourth place.

In 2015, the girls' basketball team won the CIF Southern Section Open Division championship.

In 2015, the men's combined fencing team won the State Championship.

In 2014, a column by Los Angeles Times reporter Eric Sondheimer identified Chaminade as one of a number of elite prep schools contributing to the professionalization of high-school sports. Noting that coaches at these schools are hired and fired based on their win–loss records, and that the schools' administrations rely heavily on transfer students to stack athletic teams with all-star players, Sondheimer concluded that if Chaminade's practices are the "new normal," then, "the original mission of high school sports is headed for extinction."

== Sexual abuse allegations ==
In 2013, five Catholic orders released the confidential personnel files of a dozen priests and nuns accused of sexually abusing minors throughout previous decades. The files revealed that priest Joseph DiPeri was accused of molesting a student at Chaminade High School in 1977–78. The school's administration was informed at the time, but no further action was taken. A letter from a Los Angeles police detective in the file noted that, "There was no mandatory reporting at the time of the alleged incident."

The files also included sexual-abuse allegations from 1973 to 1974 against Charles George Fatooh, who worked at both Chaminade's high school and middle school campuses. Fatooh was voted Teacher of the Year in 1975, and became principal of Chaminade Middle School in 1979.

In August, 2017, an unnamed teacher was placed on leave after school officials sent a letter home to parents informing them of "credible evidence" that inappropriate physical conduct between the teacher and student(s) had taken place. Chaminade did not name the teacher in the letter to parents, or in any other public statements.

School officials said they hired an independent investigator to review the case. According to local news, a parent whose son was in the teacher's class said, "He seemed like such a nice guy, was really good to my son who just got out of the hospital so it's a bummer." The Los Angeles Police Department confirmed an open investigation into the allegations. The school also received criticism from alumni for their refusal to name the teacher in question.

During the 2018–19 school year at Chaminade High School a (teaching) brother was accused of sending explicit images to a minor. The brother had been with the school since 2017 and was well known on both Chaminade campuses, serving in masses and participating in many other school-related activities. He was removed from the West Hills Marianist Community.

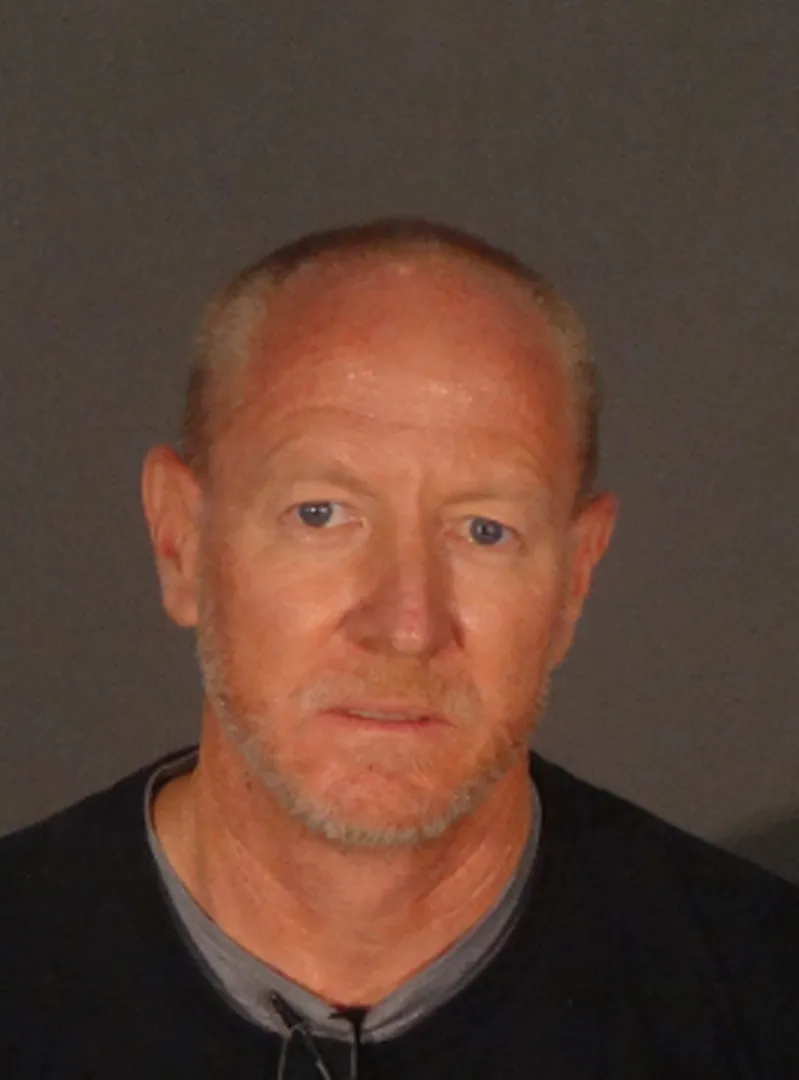
Booking photo of Steven Clark

During the 2019-20 school year, a teacher at Chaminade Middle School named Steven Clark was arrested on charges of rape and unlawful sex with a minor related to his employment. Clark later pleaded nolo contendere to these charges, which surrounded events that occurred in March 2017, and was sentenced to three years in state prison.

== Notable alumni ==
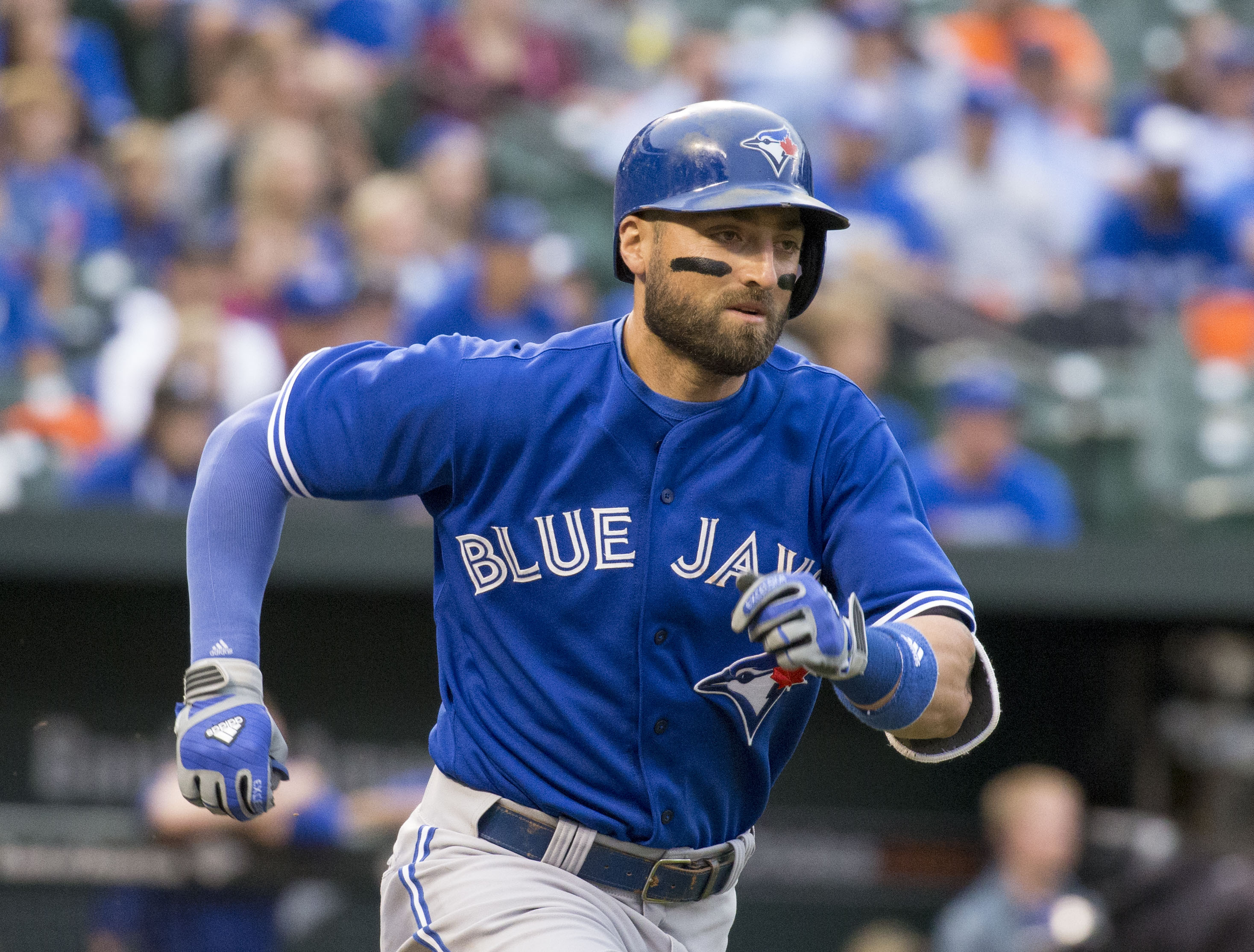
Kevin Pillar

- John Longenecker (1965) – cinematographer and Academy Award winner
- David Paich (1972) – keyboardist (Toto, Boz Scaggs) and composer / lyricist ("Rosanna", "Africa", "Lowdown", "Lido Shuffle")
- Joseph Rohde (1973) – Disney executive, lead designer of Disney's Animal Kingdom
- Laura Frankos-Turtledove (1977) – author
- Linda Hogan nee Claridge (1977) – reality TV star, ex-wife of wrestler Hulk Hogan
- Rick Bassman (1979) – entrepreneur, producer, talent agent, and author
- Ron Insana (1979) – financial journalist / analyst (CNBC and syndicated)
- Mary Elizabeth McDonough (1979) – actress (The Waltons, The New Adventures of Old Christine)
- Shelley Lubben (1986) – pornographic actress and activist
- Tracey Gold (1987) – actor
- Dean Ween (1987) – lead guitarist of Ween
- Missy Gold (1988) – actor
- Sydney Penny (1989) – actor
- Paige Hemmis (1990) – actor
- Melissa Francis (1991) – Fox News reporter/host
- Gabe Crecion (1996) - NFL player
- Marc Merrill (1998) – founder and chairman of Riot Games
- Beverley Mitchell (1999) – actor
- Brett Erlich (2000) – co-host of Current TV's InfoMania
- Jonathan Taylor Thomas (2000) – actor
- David Gallagher (2003) – actor
- Dan Runzler (2003) – San Francisco Giants pitcher
- Anna Webber (2004) – photographer
- Logan Paulsen (2005) – Washington Redskins tight end
- Chris Turner (2005) – University of Maryland quarterback
- Kevin Pillar (2007) – Toronto Blue Jays, San Francisco Giants, Boston Red Sox, Colorado Rockies outfielder
- Ryan Griffin (2008) – Tampa Bay Buccaneers quarterback
- Brad Kaaya (2014) - Carolina Panthers, Detroit Lions quarterback
- Laura Marano (2014) – actress and star of Austin & Ally
- Leaonna Odom (2016) - WNBA player
- Blake Rutherford (2016) – Chicago White Sox first baseman and outfielder
- Valerie Higgins (2017) - basketball player
- Michael Wilson (2018) – NFL wide receiver for the Arizona Cardinals
- Kenyon Martin Jr. (2019 - transferred) - NBA player
- Makur Maker (2020 - transferred) - basketball player
- Jaylen Henderson (2021) - quarterback for the Liberty Flames
- KJ Simpson (2021) - NBA player
