= Lonny Calicchio =

American football player (born 1972)

No. 17
- Position: Placekicker/Punter

Personal information
- Born: October 24, 1972 (age 54); Plantation, Florida, U.S.
- Listed height: 6 ft 3 in (1.91 m)
- Listed weight: 249 lb (113 kg)

Career information
- High school: South Plantation
- College: Northwest Mississippi (1991–1992); Ole Miss (1994–1995)
- NFL draft: 1996: undrafted

Career history
- Washington Redskins (1996)*; Dallas Cowboys (1997)*; Philadelphia Eagles (1997); Buffalo Bills (1997)*; Carolina Panthers (1998)*; Indianapolis Colts (1999)*
- * Offseason or practice squad member only

Awards and highlights
- 2× NJCAA All-American (1991, 1992); Northwest Mississippi Athletics Hall of Fame (2010)

Career NFL statistics
- Games played: 2
- Kickoffs: 9
- Kickoff yards: 546
- Touchbacks: 1
- Stats at Pro Football Reference

Lawrence Robert "Lonny" Calicchio (born October 24, 1972) is an American former professional football player who was a placekicker and punter for one season in the National Football League (NFL) for the Philadelphia Eagles. From Plantation, Florida, he played college football for Northwest Mississippi and Ole Miss. After not being selected in the 1996 NFL draft, he had offseason stints with the Washington Redskins in 1996 and Dallas Cowboys in 1997. During the 1997 season, he was signed by the Eagles and appeared in two games in two separate stints with the team. He later spent time with the Buffalo Bills, Carolina Panthers and Indianapolis Colts, although he only saw playing time in the NFL with the Eagles.

== Early life and college ==
Lawrence Robert Calicchio was born on October 24, 1972, in Plantation, Florida. He spent his early years in Burlington, Massachusetts. He attended South Plantation High School in Florida, helping the team reach the sectional playoffs as a junior. His high school long was 55 yards, and he also kicked a 65-yarder in practice. Due to low grades, Calicchio was not able to attend a major university to start his college career.

Instead, he played his first year in the National Junior College Athletic Association (NJCAA) for Northwest Mississippi Community College. He helped his team make a national championship as a sophomore, and was twice named All-American with Northwest Mississippi. After leading the nation in scoring during 1992, he was named to the NJCAA All-American first-team. He finished his junior college career 101-for-119 on extra points, and 15-for-24 on field goals.

He signed with Maryland following the 1992 season, but did not academically qualify to play. He sat out the 1993 season, working as a security guard at a Plantation, Florida, motel. "It was pretty boring," he said. "That's what made me decide I needed to get back to school and definitely play football." He transferred to Ole Miss in 1994, and was able to play.

He was named the team's starting punter and also handled kickoff duties. In a practice game at Vaught–Hemingway Stadium, Calicchio made a 70-yard punt. Teammate Stacy Wilson said, "I love to watch him kick. He's amazing to me. He's going to fill a big gap for us on special teams. There's going to be some times now when we're playing on the other peoples' end of the field."

After posting a "disturbing" 35-yard average per punt in week three against Vanderbilt, where one of his kicks went just 12 yards, Calicchio returned with a 48.1 average versus Georgia. His performance at Georgia included a 57-yard punt, the longest made by a member of Ole Miss since 1992. "At Georgia, I was kind of feeding off of what happened at Vanderbilt," he said in an interview after the game. "I made a promise to myself and the defense that I wouldn't let them down again." His head coach, Joe Lee Dunn, said, "I've always felt he’s a great punter. He's got the job as long as doesn't have any more 12-yarders."

After a blocked kick and several other errors near the end of the season, Calicchio lost his punting job to Walter Grant with two games remaining. He finished the year with a 38.7 yard average on 53 kicks. Grant, a senior, left after the year, and he regained his starting position. When Tommy Tuberville replaced Joe Lee Dunn as head coach, he decided that Calicchio's style of punting "had to go". After changing from a three-step approach to what Tuberville called a "two-step and jab", his kicks improved to a 40.3 average to start the season. Against Auburn, he set a career-long with a 79-yard kick. He was named "player of the game", after a 20–17 win over Tulane. Calicchio concluded his senior season having punted 49 times for 1,966 yards, a 40.1-yard average per punt.

== Professional career ==
After graduating, Calicchio went unselected in the 1996 NFL draft. He was subsequently signed by the Washington Redskins, but lost the position battle with Matt Turk and was released in training camp.

He was signed by the Dallas Cowboys in early 1997. In preseason week one, a loss versus the Oakland Raiders, Calicchio made a 15-yard punt, and, with fellow punter Toby Gowin, posted just a 29-yard average per punt. Though he rebounded the next week with 52-yard and 55-yard kicks, he eventually was released in favor of Gowin.

On September 23, 1997, Calicchio was signed by the Philadelphia Eagles to the practice squad. To make room, the Eagles cut Justin Armour. He was reportedly signed due to the Eagles kicking teams being described as "one of the worst in the league", with opponents starting drives on average from their own 38-yard line (compared to the league average 25). Coach Ray Rhodes said before a game against the Minnesota Vikings, "He is kicking the ball pretty decent. We will look at him a few more days. I need to see more consistency." He was promoted to the active roster against the Vikings, and kicked off to start the game, with the ball landing at the 3-yard line. "His kicks had height, but they didn't go the distance," wrote Gary Miles of The Philadelphia Inquirer. The Eagles released Calicchio on October 1, after he had played in just one game. His roster spot was filled by Justin Armour, who had been released to make room for Calicchio one week earlier.

He returned to the Eagles in late October and was named kickoff specialist for their game against the Arizona Cardinals. An article in The Philadelphia Inquirer said, "It took him five weeks, dozens of practice kicks and a victory this week in a three-way kickoff contest, but Lonny Calicchio will finally get another chance to save the Eagles' kickoff team." His kicks again were short, with none reaching the endzone besides one that was called back, and the Eagles lost 21–31. He was subsequently released along with Justin Armour.

Calicchio signed with the practice squad of the Buffalo Bills on December 1, 1997. He became a free agent after the season ended. He signed with the Carolina Panthers for the 1998 season but was released on August 24, 1998.

On April 21, 1999, Calicchio was signed by the Indianapolis Colts. In a preseason game versus the Cincinnati Bengals, he "all but whiffed" on a kickoff and injured himself during the play, leading to his release with an injury settlement shortly afterwards. After being out of football for three years, he was given a tryout with the Minnesota Vikings in 2002, but did not sign. He subsequently retired.

== Later life ==
Calicchio later became a police officer in Miramar, Florida. He was inducted into the Northwest Mississippi Community College Athletics Hall of Fame in 2010.
