= Cameron Collins =

American football player (born 1989)

No. 90
- Positions: Linebacker, Special teams

Personal information
- Born: September 29, 1989 (age 37); Cherry Point, North Carolina
- Listed height: 6 ft 2 in (1.88 m)
- Listed weight: 246 lb (112 kg)

Career information
- High school: Santa Monica (Santa Monica, California)
- College: Oregon State

Career history
- Houston Texans (2012)
- Stats at Pro Football Reference

Cameron Collins (born September 29, 1989) is a former professional American football linebacker who played in one game for the Houston Texans during the 2012-13 NFL playoffs.

== Playing career ==
Collins played football in high school at Santa Monica High School and in college at Oregon State.

In the 2012–13 NFL playoffs, he played for the Houston Texans during their 19–13 victory over the Cincinnati Bengals in the wild card opening round. Collins was on the field for 17 special teams plays in the game.

He never appeared in an NFL regular season game.

== See also ==
- 2012 Houston Texans season
