= David Hunter (American football) =

American football player (born 1989)

No. 72
- Position: Defensive Tackle

Personal information
- Born: September 19, 1989 (age 37); Waller, Texas, U.S.
- Listed height: 6 ft 2 in (1.88 m)
- Listed weight: 301 lb (137 kg)

Career information
- High school: Waller (TX)
- College: Houston
- NFL draft: 2012: undrafted

Career history
- Houston Texans (2012); Tampa Bay Buccaneers (2014)*; Houston Texans (2014)*; New Orleans Saints (2015)*
- * Offseason or practice squad member only
- Stats at Pro Football Reference

David Darrell Hunter (born September 19, 1989) is an American former football defensive tackle.

== College career ==
Hunter played college football at Houston.

== Houston Texans ==
Hunter signed with the Houston Texans as an undrafted free agent on May 14, 2012. He was added to the 53-man roster on October 16, 2012, but did not play due to a toe injury experienced in practice. He returned to the Texans for training camp in 2013; he was later released. Hunter signed with the Tampa Bay Buccaneers on January 6, 2014, but before seeing any action with Tampa Bay returned to his former team, signing with the Texans on July 24, 2014. The Texans released Hunter on August 25, 2015.
