= Jeremy Calahan =

American football player (born 1983)

No. 90, 96
- Position: Defensive tackle

Personal information
- Born: July 7, 1983 (age 43); Austin, Texas, U.S.
- Listed height: 6 ft 2 in (1.88 m)
- Listed weight: 298 lb (135 kg)

Career information
- High school: Pflugerville (Pflugerville, Texas)
- College: Rice (2001–2004)
- NFL draft: 2005: undrafted

Career history
- St. Louis Rams (2005); Dallas Desperados (2007–2008)
- Stats at Pro Football Reference
- Stats at ArenaFan.com

Michael Jeremy Calahan (born July 7, 1983) is an American former professional football defensive tackle who played one season with the St. Louis Rams of the National Football League (NFL). He played college football at Rice. He was also a member of the Dallas Desperados of the Arena Football League (AFL).

== Early life and college ==
Michael Jeremy Calahan was born on July 7, 1983, in Austin, Texas. He attended Pflugerville High School in Pflugerville, Texas.

Calahan was a four-year letterman for the Rice Owls of Rice University from 2001 to 2004. He started three games his true freshman year in 2001 and was a full-time starter the following three seasons.

== Professional career ==
After going undrafted in the 2005 NFL draft, Calahan signed with the St. Louis Rams on April 28, 2005. He was released on September 3 and signed to the practice squad two days later. He was promoted to the active roster on December 14 and played in one game that season, recording a solo tackle. Calahan was released by the Rams on August 28, 2006.

Calahan signed with the Dallas Desperados of the Arena Football League (AFL) on October 23, 2006. He was placed on injured reserve on February 26, 2007, and was activated on April 26, 2007. He was an offensive/defensive lineman during his time in the AFL as the league played under ironman rules. Calahan played in seven games for the Desperados during the 2007 season, posting two solo tackles. In 2008, he totaled three solo tackles, two assisted tackles, and two receptions for 18 yards and a touchdown.
