= Gabe Crecion =

American football player (born 1977)

No. 47
- Position: Tight end / defensive lineman

Personal information
- Born: July 9, 1977 (age 49); West Hills, California, U.S.
- Listed height: 6 ft 5 in (1.96 m)
- Listed weight: 255 lb (116 kg)

Career information
- High school: Chaminade College Prep (West Hills, California)
- College: UCLA
- NFL draft: 2001: undrafted

Career history
- Bakersfield Blitz (2002); San Francisco 49ers (2003–2004); → Barcelona Dragons (2003)

Career NFL statistics
- Games played: 1
- Stats at Pro Football Reference

Career AFL statistics
- Games played: 15
- Total tackles: 27
- Sacks: 4
- Forced fumbles: 3
- Pass deflections: 4

Gabriel John Crecion (born July 9, 1977) is an American former professional football player who was a tight end for the San Francisco 49ers of the National Football League (NFL). Originally from Northridge, California, he played college football for the UCLA Bruins. After going undrafted in the 2001 NFL draft, Crecion began his professional football career as a two-way offensive and defensive lineman with the Bakersfield Blitz of af2 in 2002. Returning to his primary position of tight end, he signed with the 49ers in 2003 and played for the Barcelona Dragons of NFL Europe that year. In 2004, Crecion made his NFL debut with the 49ers, appearing in one game.

== Early life and college ==
Born in the West Hills section of Los Angeles, Crecion grew up in nearby Northridge and attended Chaminade College Preparatory School, where he played at tight end on the football team and pitcher on the baseball team. BlueChips Illustrated named Crecion in its All-American team. Crecion graduated from Chaminade Prep in 1996, and the Baltimore Orioles selected Crecion in the 19th round of the 1996 Major League Baseball draft. In the 1998 Major League Baseball draft, Crecion was again selected, this time by the New York Yankees in the 16th round. However, Crecion never played professional baseball.

Crecion attended the University of California, Los Angeles, majoring in anthropology and playing at tight end on the UCLA Bruins football team from 1996 to 2000 under head coach Bob Toledo; he redshirted the 1998 season. In the 1997 season, when UCLA finished with a no. 5 AP Poll ranking and 1998 Cotton Bowl Classic title, Crecion had six receptions for 79 yards. As a senior in 2000, Crecion had eight receptions for 122 yards and a touchdown.

== Pro football career ==
Not selected in the 2001 NFL draft, Crecion began his pro football career playing at offensive lineman and defensive lineman for the Bakersfield Blitz of af2. In the 2002 season for the Blitz, Crecion had 27 total tackles (17 solo, 20 assisted) including 3.5 tackles for loss, four sacks for a loss of 10 yards, four passes broken up, three forced fumbles, and a fumble recovered for a touchdown. On offense, Crecion had one receptions and four rushing attempts for 15 yards and a touchdown.

In February 2003, he signed with the San Francisco 49ers of the NFL, and he was assigned to the Barcelona Dragons of NFL Europe. Crecion had 15 receptions for 123 yards and a touchdown with the Dragons.

He played in one game for the San Francisco 49ers of the National Football League during week 6 of the 2004 season.

== Post-football career ==
After retiring from football, Crecion became an insurance sales representative. In 2011, Crecion graduated from the Pepperdine Graziadio Business School with an MBA. He was the student speaker at his class's graduation ceremony.
