= 1996 Miami Dolphins season =

31st season in franchise history

- Owner: Wayne Huizenga
- General manager: Eddie Jones
- Head coach: Jimmy Johnson
- Home stadium: Pro Player Park/Stadium

Results
- Record: 8–8
- Division place: 4th AFC East
- Playoffs: Did not qualify
- All-Pros: None
- Pro Bowlers: None

The 1996 season was the Miami Dolphins' 31st season overall, their 27th in the National Football League (NFL), their seventh under general manager Eddie Jones and their first under head coach Jimmy Johnson. The Dolphins failed to improve upon their previous season's output of 9–7, winning only eight games. The team failed to qualify for the postseason.

This was the Dolphins' first season since 1969 without long-time head coach Don Shula, as he retired from coaching during the offseason despite having a year left in his contract. Shula retired as the winningest coach in NFL history, with 347 career wins in his 32-year head coaching career, and as the only coach (as of 2024) to have led his team to a perfect season since the 1970 AFL-NFL merger.

The Dolphins' home field, previously known as Joe Robbie Stadium, was renamed on August 26 to Pro Player Park after naming rights were sold to Pro Player, an apparel brand by Fruit of the Loom.

However, in a rare move, the stadium was renamed again following the Dolphins’ opening contest at Pro Player Park. On September 10, before the Dolphins returned home in week 3, the stadium was renamed Pro Player Stadium, a name that would remain through the 2004 season.

This was the final season for 23 years that not a single Dolphin made the Pro Bowl. This was also the final season Gene Atkins would play in the NFL.

== Offseason ==
Following the 1995 season head coach Don Shula announced his retirement from coaching, having spent 26 straight seasons with the Dolphins. Jimmy Johnson, quit Dallas after winning Super Bowls XXVII and XXVIII, was hired as only the third head coach in Dolphins history.

=== NFL draft ===
1996 Miami Dolphins draft
Round	Pick	Player	Position	College	Notes
1	20	Daryl Gardener	Defensive tackle	Baylor	
3	79	Dorian Brew	Defensive back	Kansas	
3	80	Abdul-Karim al-Jabbar	Running back	UCLA	
4	113	Kirk Pointer	Defensive back	Austin Peay	
4	118	Stanley Pritchett	Fullback	South Carolina	
4	125	LaCurtis Jones	Linebacker	Baylor	
5	134	Jerris McPhail	Running back	East Carolina	
5	150	Shane Burton	Defensive end	Tennessee	
5	154	Zach Thomas * ^{†}	Linebacker	Texas Tech	
6	189	Shawn Wooden	Defensive back	Notre Dame	
7	230	Jeff Buckey	Guard	Stanford	
7	251	Brice Hunter	Wide receiver	Georgia	
Made roster † Pro Football Hall of Fame * Made at least one Pro Bowl during career

=== Notable undrafted free agent ===
1996 Miami Dolphins draft
Round	Pick	Player	Position	College	Notes
—	—	Larry Izzo *	Linebacker	Rice	
Made roster † Pro Football Hall of Fame * Made at least one Pro Bowl during career

== Season summary ==
Johnson and the Dolphins endured a rough season, winning their first three games before losing two straight. On October 27 the Dolphins hosted the Cowboys with both teams 4–3 in one of the most anticipated games of the regular season; the Cowboys rallied and won handily 29–10, and Cowboys coach Barry Switzer declared that no Dolphins player (even quarterback Dan Marino) could start on his Cowboys squad. The Dolphins won twice in the next two weeks but then lost three straight, ending any playoff hopes despite winning their final two games and finishing 8–8.

== Staff ==
1996 Miami Dolphins staff
Front office: Chairman/managing general partner – Wayne Huizenga; Vice chairman – Don Shula; Vice chairman, president and CEO – Jimmy Johnson; General manager – Jimmy Johnson; Head coaches: Head coach – Jimmy Johnson; Offensive coaches: Offensive coordinator – Gary Stevens; Quarterbacks – Gary Stevens; Running backs/run game coordinator – Kippy Brown; Wide receivers – Larry Seiple; Tight ends – Pat Jones; Offensive line – Larry Beightol; Assistant offensive line – Rich McGeorge	Defensive coaches: Defensive coordinator – George Hill; Defensive line – Gary Godette; Assistant defensive line – Andre Carter; Defensive backs – Mel Phillips; Special teams coaches: Assistant special teams – Mike Westhoff; Strength and conditioning: Head strength and conditioning – John Gamble; Assistant strength and conditioning – Junior Wade

== Roster ==
1996 Miami Dolphins roster
Quarterbacks (QB): 7 Craig Erickson; 19 Bernie Kosar; 13 Dan Marino; Running backs (RB): 33 Karim Abdul-Jabbar; 28 Brandon Bennett; 30 Bernie Parmalee; 36 Stanley Pritchett FB; 40 Irving Spikes KR; 49 Robert Wilson FB; Wide receivers (WR): 80 Fred Barnett; 87 Kirby Dar Dar KR; 89 Randal Hill; 88 Charles Jordan; 81 O. J. McDuffie; 83 Scott Miller; 85 Lamar Thomas; Tight ends (TE): 86 Brett Carolan; 84 Troy Drayton	Offensive linemen (OL): 60 John Bock C; 76 James Brown T; 77 Jeff Buckey G; 63 Cal Dixon C; 66 Everett McIver G; 61 Tim Ruddy C; 69 Keith Sims G; 78 Richmond Webb T; Defensive linemen (DL): 93 Trace Armstrong DE; 95 Tim Bowens DT; 75 Shane Burton DE; 94 Steve Emtman DT; 92 Daryl Gardener DT; 98 Norman Hand DT; 96 Danny Stubbs DE; 97 Oscar Sturgis DE	Linebackers (LB): 57 O. J. Brigance MLB; 51 Anthony Harris OLB; 50 Dwight Hollier OLB; 53 Larry Izzo MLB; 55 Chris Singleton OLB; 54 Zach Thomas MLB; Defensive backs (DB): 23 Robert Bailey CB; 37 J. B. Brown CB; 27 Terrell Buckley CB; 31 Sean Hill FS/CB; 38 Calvin Jackson CB; 34 Tim Jacobs CB; 25 Louis Oliver SS; 35 Michael Stewart SS; 24 Jerry Wilson CB; 22 Shawn Wooden FS; Special teams (ST): 17 John Kidd P; 6 Joe Nedney K; 82 Frank Wainright LS	Practice squad: 67 John Elmore G; 91 Larry Jackson DE; 52 Marc Lillibridge LB (IR); 48 Lee McClinton FB; 68 Mike Sheldon T; Reserve: 62 Chris Gray G (IR); 32 Jerris McPhail (IR); Rookies in italics 53 active, 3 reserve, 4 practice squad

== Preseason ==
=== Schedule ===
Week	Date	Opponent	Result	Record	Venue	Recap
1	August 2	Tampa Bay Buccaneers	W 13–10	1–0	Joe Robbie Stadium	Recap
2	August 11	at Chicago Bears	L 21–24	1–1	Soldier Field	Recap
3	August 19	Minnesota Vikings	W 24–17	2–1	Joe Robbie Stadium	Recap
4	August 23	at Tampa Bay Buccaneers	W 19–7	3–1	Tampa Stadium	Recap

== Regular season ==
=== Schedule ===
Week	Date	Opponent	Result	Record	Venue	Attendance
1	September 1	**New England Patriots**	**W** 24–10	1–0	Pro Player Stadium	71,542
2	September 8	at Arizona Cardinals	**W** 38–10	2–0	Sun Devil Stadium	55,444
3	September 15	**New York Jets**	**W** 36–27	3–0	Pro Player Stadium	68,137
4	September 23	at **Indianapolis Colts**	**L** 6–10	3–1	RCA Dome	60,891
5	Bye					
6	October 6	Seattle Seahawks	**L** 15–22	3–2	Pro Player Stadium	59,539
7	October 13	at **Buffalo Bills**	**W** 21–7	4–2	Rich Stadium	79,642
8	October 20	at Philadelphia Eagles	**L** 28–35	4–3	Veterans Stadium	66,240
9	October 27	Dallas Cowboys	**L** 10–29	4–4	Pro Player Stadium	75,283
10	November 3	at **New England Patriots**	**L** 23–42	4–5	Foxboro Stadium	58,942
11	November 10	**Indianapolis Colts**	**W** 37–13	5–5	Pro Player Stadium	66,623
12	November 17	at Houston Oilers	**W** 23–20	6–5	Astrodome	47,358
13	November 25	Pittsburgh Steelers	**L** 17–24	6–6	Pro Player Stadium	73,489
14	December 1	at Oakland Raiders	**L** 7–17	6–7	Oakland–Alameda County Coliseum	60,591
15	December 8	New York Giants	**L** 7–17	6–8	Pro Player Stadium	63,889
16	December 16	**Buffalo Bills**	**W** 16–14	7–8	Pro Player Stadium	67,016
17	December 22	at **New York Jets**	**W** 31–28	8–8	Giants Stadium	49,933
Note: Intra-division opponents are in **bold** text.

== Game summaries ==
=== Week 1: vs. New England Patriots ===
Week 1: New England Patriots at Miami Dolphins – Game summary

Quarter	1	2	3	4	Total
Patriots	0	3	7	0	10
Dolphins	10	7	7	0	24

at Pro Player Stadium, Miami Gardens, Florida

- Date: September 1
- Game time: 4:00 pm. EDT
- Game weather: 85 °F (29 °C), relative humidity 69%, wind 7 mph
- Game attendance: 71,542
- Referee: Gerry Austin
- TV announcers (NBC): Dick Enberg, Paul Maguire and Phil Simms
- Recap

Game information
First quarter
- MIA – Drew Bledsoe pass incomplete is intercepted by Louis Oliver and returned for 60 yards. Louis Oliver fumbles, recovered by Sean Hill, touchdown (Joe Nedney kick), 11:06. Dolphins 0–7. Drive: 8 plays.

Top passers

- NE – Drew Bledsoe – 18/24, 221 yards, 1 TD, 2 INT
- MIA – Dan Marino – 16/22, 176 yards, 0 TD, 1 INT

Top rushers

- NE– Curtis Martin – 11 rushes, 23 yards
- MIA – Karim Abdul-Jabbar – 26 rushes, 115 yards, TD

Top receivers

- NE– Ben Coates – 6 receptions, 69 yards, TD
- MIA– Stanley Pritchett – 6 receptions, 77 yards

The Dolphins raced to a 24–3 lead in the third quarter, scoring twice on Patriots fumbles, then withstood a Ben Coates touchdown catch to win 24–10, the first win for Jimmy Johnson as a coach since Super Bowl XXVIII.

=== Week 2: at Arizona Cardinals ===
Week 2: Miami Dolphins at Arizona Cardinals – Game summary

Quarter	1	2	3	4	Total
Dolphins	7	17	7	7	38
Cardinals	0	0	10	0	10

at Sun Devil Stadium, Tempe, Arizona

- Date: September 8
- Game time: 8:00 p.m. MDT
- Game weather: Clear, 90 °F (32 °C)
- Game attendance: 55,444
- TV announcers (TNT): Verne Lundquist and Pat Haden
- Recap,

Game information

First quarter

- MIA – Karim Abdul-Jabbar 3 yard rush (Joe Nedney kick). Dolphins 7–0.

Second quarter

- MIA – Karim Abdul-Jabbar 3 yard rush (Joe Nedney kick). Dolphins 14–0.
- MIA – Lamar Thomas 20 yard pass from Dan Marino (Joe Nedney kick). Dolphins 21–0.
- MIA – Joe Nedney 36 yard field goal Dolphins 24–0.

Third quarter

- ARI – Cedric Smith 1 yard pass from Kent Graham (Greg Davis kick) Dolphins 24–7.
- ARI – Greg Davis 26 yard field goal. Dolphins 24–10.
- MIA – Irving Spikes 1 yard rush (Joe Nedney kick) Dolphins 31–10.

Fourth quarter

- MIA – O.J. McDuffie 5 yard pass from Dan Marino (Joe Nedney kick) Dolphins 38–10.

Top passers

- MIA – Dan Marino – 14/23, 178 yards, 2 TD
- ARI – Kent Graham – 13/19, 133 yards, 1 TD, 2 INT

Top rushers

- MIA – Irving Spikes – 11 rushes, 79 yards, TD
- ARI – Larry Centers – 6 rushes, 23 yards

Top receivers

- MIA – Lamar Thomas – 3 receptions, 40 yards, TD
- ARI – Frank Sanders – 8 receptions, 81 yards

The Dolphins picked off Cardinals quarterbacks Kent Graham and Boomer Esiason a total of three times as they exploded to 38 points, winning 38–10.

=== Week Three vs. NY Jets ===
The slumping NY Jets erupted and the ensuing game became a slugfest. Aaron Glenn picked off Dan Marino at the Jets goalline and ran back a 100-yard touchdown. Webster Slaughter then caught a 30-yard touchdown, but after that the Dolphins exploded to five straight touchdowns, marred by poor kicking by Joe Nedney, who missed a point after and a field goal. The Jets rallied from down 33–14, highlighted by a 29-yard touchdown catch by Keyshawn Johnson on 4th and goal at the 29; Keyshawn outjumped the entire Dolphins defense for the catch. Nedney then put the game out of reach on a 29-yard field goal in the final minutes and the Dolphins won 36–27.

=== Week Four Monday Night Football at Indianapolis Colts ===
In a 10–6 loss Dan Marino suffered his fourth straight loss to the Colts (dating coincidentally to another 10–6 loss, this one in December 1994). He threw only eight passes for 67 yards before giving way to backup Bernie Kosar, who managed 122 yards but no touchdowns. The game saw only 467 total yards and eight quarterback sacks as Jim Harbaugh's one-yard score to Ken Dilger put the game's only touchdown on the board.

=== Week Six vs. Seattle Seahawks ===
Marino had to sit out as Craig Erickson was sacked four times and intercepted once. The Dolphins fumbled seven times, losing two, mostly on botched snaps between Erickson and center Tim Ruddy. Seattle's John Friesz threw for 299 yards, 196 of them on three touchdowns, in a 22-15 Seahawks win.

=== Week Seven at Buffalo Bills ===
With Marino still out Miami traveled to Rich Stadium having lost seventeen of their last 21 meetings with the Bills, but things turned around as the Bills reached the Miami 1-yard line down 14-7 but Terrell Buckley picked off Jim Kelly and ran back a 99-yard touchdown for the 21-7 Miami win. It was Kelly's third pick of the game to go with seven sacks; the disconsolate Kelly said after the game, "We deserved to be booed. I deserved to be booed."

=== Week Eight at Philadelphia Eagles ===
In a penalty-laden game (a combined seventeen fouls for 149 yards) the Eagles and Dolphins traded touchdowns before the Eagles won 35–28. Craig Erickson had two touchdowns but one interception, and following a 49-yard Ricky Watters score Bernie Kosar was put into the game, throwing a touchdown to O.J. McDuffie.

=== Week Nine vs. Dallas Cowboys ===
It was the most anticipated regular-season meeting in the NFL of the year; Miami sports personality Dan Le Batard called it "the most anticipated meeting ever between two 4-3 teams." The game was the first meeting between former Cowboys coach Jimmy Johnson and the Cowboys since the tumultuous March 1994 showdown with Jerry Jones that ended Johnson's job as Cowboys head coach. With Michael Irvin back with the team after a league suspension for the first five games, the Cowboys broke out of a 10-9 Miami lead with three Troy Aikman touchdowns. After the 29-10 Cowboys win coach Barry Switzer stated no Miami starter, Dan Marino included, could start for his Cowboys squad.

=== Week Ten at New England Patriots ===
The Dolphins fell 42-23 and their record sank to 4-5 as Dan Marino and Craig Erickson managed 331 passing yards to Drew Bledsoe's 419 yards. Miami got two touchdowns from Karim Abdul-Jabbar while Curtis Martin punched in three scores and Ben Coates caught two touchdowns, one a short pass caught at the New England 17 that he ran in for the 83-yard score.

=== Week Eleven vs. Indianapolis Colts ===
Dan Marino passed 50,000 passing yards, the first player to do so, on a 37-yard strike to O.J. McDuffie as the Dolphins emphatically returned to .500 by whipping the Colts 37–13; the previous year Marino had broken Fran Tarkenton records for touchdowns, yardage, and completions in a home loss to the Patriots and a season sweep by the Colts. Jim Harbaugh managed only 126 yards and was sacked in the endzone for a safety.

=== Week Twelve at Houston Oilers ===
In their final season in Houston the future Tennessee Titans clawed to a 17–13 lead in the fourth quarter. Zach Thomas intercepted Chris Chandler for a 26-yard touchdown but Chandler led the game-tying drive in the fourth on Al Del Greco's 33-yard field goal. Marino got the Dolphins down field in the final minute and Joe Nedney won the game 23–20 on a 29-yard kick. Both teams now stood at 6–5.

=== Week Thirteen Monday Night Football vs. Pittsburgh Steelers ===
Despite two fumbles and a Mike Tomczak pick-six (run back by Calvin Jackson for a 61-yard touchdown) the Steelers erased a 14-3 Dolphins lead and won 24–17 on Ernie Mills' 20-yard score. The Dolphins were flagged for nine penalties to one for the Steelers.

=== Week Fourteen at Oakland Raiders ===
The Dolphins traveled to Oakland–Alameda County Coliseum for the first time since November 1980; the Dolphins were winless there and fell again, this time 17-7 as Dan Marino was intercepted three times and managed only one touchdown.

=== Week Fifteen vs. NY Giants ===
For the second straight week the Dolphins fell 17–7, this time to the Giants, who picked off Marino twice as the two teams managed only 474 combined yards.

=== Week Sixteen Monday Night Football vs Buffalo Bills ===
All but eliminated from the playoff race, the Dolphins salvaged a glimmer of hope as they clawed to a 16–7 lead in the fourth and absorbed a late Eric Moulds touchdown to win 16–14. The Dolphins rushed for 140 yards and the win put the Bills to the edge of falling out of the playoffs.

=== Week Seventeen at NY Jets ===
The disastrous Rich Kotite era in New York ended in the sixth game of 1996 where the Jets blew a halftime lead; up 14-7 after a Hugh Douglas fumble return score, the Jets saw the Dolphins outscore them 24–14 in the second half. Dan Marino threw for three touchdowns as Karim Abdul-Jabbar exploded to 152 yards on the ground, outclassing the 69 yards of Adrian Murrell. The Dolphins finished 8-8 while the Jets limped into the offseason at 1–15.

=== Standings ===
==== Division ====
AFC East
	W	L	T	PCT	PF	PA	STK
^{(2)} New England Patriots	11	5	0	.688	418	313	W1
^{(4)} Buffalo Bills	10	6	0	.625	319	266	W1
^{(6)} Indianapolis Colts	9	7	0	.563	317	334	L1
Miami Dolphins	8	8	0	.500	339	325	W2
New York Jets	1	15	0	.063	279	454	L7
