= 1995 New York Jets season =

1995 season of NFL team New York Jets

- Owner: Leon Hess
- Head coach: Rich Kotite
- Offensive coordinator: Zeke Bratkowski
- Defensive coordinator: Jim Vechiarella
- Home stadium: Giants Stadium

Results
- Record: 3–13
- Division place: 5th AFC East
- Playoffs: Did not qualify
- Pro Bowlers: None

The 1995 New York Jets season was the 36th season for the team and the 26th in the National Football League. The Jets entered the 1995 season with their third different head coach in as many years as former Philadelphia Eagles head coach Rich Kotite was hired to replace Pete Carroll, who was fired after posting a 6–10 record in his only season as Jets head coach. Kotite did not have any success in his first year, as the team finished 3–13. The 13 losses set a team record, while the three wins were the fewest of any Jets team since 1977, when the team completed their third consecutive 3–11 season. The Jets were the first team to lose to the Carolina Panthers with a 26–15 loss in week 7.

Starting with their October 1 game against the Oakland Raiders, the Jets began wearing a “DS” graphic in the shape of a football as a memorial to general manager Dick Steinberg, who had died on September 25 from stomach cancer. The Jets did not have any players selected to the Pro Bowl after the season.

== Offseason ==
=== 1995 expansion draft ===
New York Jets selected during the expansion draft
Round	Overall	Name	Position	Expansion team
9	17	Paul Frase	Defensive Tackle	Jacksonville Jaguars
28	56	Jack Trudeau	Quarterback	Carolina Panthers

=== NFL draft ===
1995 New York Jets draft
Round	Pick	Player	Position	College	Notes
1	9	Kyle Brady	Tight end	Penn State	
1	16	Hugh Douglas *	Defensive end	Central State (OH)	
2	33	Matt O'Dwyer	Guard	Northwestern	
4	106	Melvin Hayes	Offensive tackle	Mississippi State	
4	107	Tyrone Davis	Wide receiver	Virginia	
5	142	Carl Greenwood	Cornerback	UCLA	
6	177	Troy Sienkiewicz	Offensive tackle	New Mexico State	
7	217	Curtis Ceaser	Wide receiver	Grambling State	
Made roster * Made at least one Pro Bowl during career

=== Undrafted free agents ===
1995 undrafted free agents of note
Player	Position	College
Chad Askew	Wide receiver	Pittsburgh
Todd Baczek	Guard	Northwestern
Chad Cascadden	Linebacker	Wisconsin
Wayne Chrebet	Wide Receiver	Hofstra
Terry Connealy	Defensive tackle	Nebraska
Colin Cronin	Guard	Michigan State
Don Davis	Linebacker	Kansas
Erik Marsh	Running back	Lafayette
Sherriden May	Fullback	Idaho
John Sacca	Quarterback	Eastern Kentucky

== Personnel ==
=== Staff ===
1995 New York Jets staff
Front office: Chairman of the board – Leon Hess; President – Steve Gutman; Vice president/general manager – Dick Steinberg; Assistant general manager – James Harris; Director of player personnel – Dick Haley; Director of pro personnel – Jim Royer; Director of player administration – Pat Kirwan; Head coaches: Head coach – Rich Kotite; Offensive coaches: Offensive coordinator/quarterbacks – Zeke Bratkowski; Running backs – Dick Wood; Wide receivers/tight ends – Richard Mann; Offensive line – Bill Muir	Defensive coaches: Defensive coordinator/linebackers – Jim Vechiarella; Defensive line – Ray Hamilton; Secondary – Peter Giunta; Defensive assistant/quality control – Tom Gamble; Special teams coaches: Special teams – Ken Rose; Strength and conditioning: Strength and conditioning – Jim Williams

=== Roster ===
1995 New York Jets roster
Quarterbacks (QB): 6 Bubby Brister; 7 Boomer Esiason; 14 Erik Wilhelm; Running backs (RB): 30 Brad Baxter FB; 32 Sherriden May; 33 Ronald Moore; 29 Adrian Murrell; 34 Kenyon Rasheed; Wide receivers (WR): 88 Curtis Ceaser; 80 Wayne Chrebet; 83 Tyrone Davis; 85 Jeff Sydner PR; 89 Charles Wilson; 87 Ryan Yarborough; Tight ends (TE): 84 Fred Baxter; 81 Kyle Brady; 86 Johnny Mitchell	Offensive linemen (OL): 68 John Bock C; 76 James Brown T; 52 Cal Dixon C/G; 62 Roger Duffy G; 79 Melvin Hayes T; 67 Everett McIver T; 77 Matt Willig T; 61 Terrence Wisdom G; Defensive linemen (DL): 78 Lou Benfatti DT; 94 Matt Brock DT; 92 Tony Casillas DT; 99 Hugh Douglas DE; 74 Erik Howard DE/DT; 93 Marc Spindler DT; 97 Marvin Washington DE	Linebackers (LB): 53 Chad Cascadden OLB; 59 Kyle Clifton MLB; 55 Bobby Houston OLB; 54 Marvin Jones MLB; 57 Mo Lewis OLB; 58 Wilber Marshall OLB; 51 Eddie Mason OLB; Defensive backs (DB): 26 Ron Carpenter FS; 31 Aaron Glenn CB; 21 Victor Green SS; 22 Carl Greenwood CB; 25 Gary Jones FS; 43 Vance Joseph CB; 37 Anthony Prior CB; 45 Otis Smith CB; 44 Lonnie Young SS; Special teams (ST): 11 Brian Hansen P; 8 Nick Lowery K; 2 Pat O'Neill P; 5 Don Silvestri K	Practice squad: 18 Alan Allen WR; 95 Vince Stewart DT; 49 Alan Young LB; Reserve: 72 David Alexander C; 20 Richie Anderson RB (IR); 16 Chad Askew WR (IR); 98 Kurt Barber LB (IR); 66 Donald Evans DE (IR); 4 Glenn Foley QB (IR); 63 Carlton Haselrig G (Susp.); 75 Siupeli Malamala T (IR); 70 Matt O'Dwyer G (IR); 23 Marcus Turner S (IR); Rookies in italics 53 active, 10 reserve, 3 practice squad

== Regular season ==
=== Schedule ===
Week	Date	Opponent	Result	Record	Venue	Attendance
1	September 3	at **Miami Dolphins**	**L** 14–52	0–1	Joe Robbie Stadium	71,317
2	September 10	**Indianapolis Colts**	**L** 24–27 (OT)	0–2	Giants Stadium	65,134
3	September 17	Jacksonville Jaguars	**W** 27–10	1–2	Giants Stadium	49,970
4	September 24	at Atlanta Falcons	**L** 3–13	1–3	Georgia Dome	40,778
5	October 1	Oakland Raiders	**L** 10–47	1–4	Giants Stadium	68,941
6	October 8	at **Buffalo Bills**	**L** 10–29	1–5	Rich Stadium	79,485
7	October 15	at Carolina Panthers	**L** 15–26	1–6	Memorial Stadium	52,613
8	October 22	**Miami Dolphins**	**W** 17–16	2–6	Giants Stadium	67,228
9	October 29	at **Indianapolis Colts**	**L** 10–17	2–7	RCA Dome	49,250
10	November 5	**New England Patriots**	**L** 7–20	2–8	Giants Stadium	61,462
11	Bye					
12	November 19	**Buffalo Bills**	**L** 26–28	2–9	Giants Stadium	54,436
13	November 26	at Seattle Seahawks	**W** 16–10	3–9	Kingdome	41,160
14	December 3	St. Louis Rams	**L** 20–23	3–10	Giants Stadium	52,023
15	December 10	at **New England Patriots**	**L** 28–31	3–11	Foxboro Stadium	46,617
16	December 17	at Houston Oilers	**L** 6–23	3–12	Astrodome	35,873
17	December 24	New Orleans Saints	**L** 0–12	3–13	Giants Stadium	28,885
Note: Intra-division opponents are in **bold** text.

=== Standings ===
AFC East
	W	L	T	PCT	PF	PA	STK
^{(3)} Buffalo Bills	10	6	0	.625	350	335	L1
^{(5)} Indianapolis Colts	9	7	0	.563	331	316	W1
^{(6)} Miami Dolphins	9	7	0	.563	398	332	W1
New England Patriots	6	10	0	.375	294	377	L2
New York Jets	3	13	0	.188	233	384	L4

== Season summary ==
=== Week 2 vs Colts ===
Week Two: Indianapolis Colts (0–1) at New York Jets (0–1)

Quarter	1	2	3	4	OT	Total
Colts	0	3	7	14	3	27
Jets	14	3	7	0	0	24

at Giants Stadium, East Rutherford, New Jersey

- Date: September 10, 1995
- Game time: 3:05 p.m. EST
- Game weather: Sunny, 68 °F (20 °C)
- Game attendance: 65,134
- Referee: Larry Nemmers
- TV announcers (NBC): Tom Hammond and Bob Trumpy
- Box Score, Box Score

Game information

First quarter

- NYJ – Charles Wilson 5-yard pass from Boomer Esiason (Nick Lowery kick), 5:52. Jets 7–0. Drive: 15 plays, 70 yards, 9:08.
- NYJ – Otis Wilson 49-yard interception return (Nick Lowery kick), 3:51. Jets 14–0.

Second quarter

- NYJ – Nick Lowery 28-yard field goal, 11:41. Jets 17–0. Drive: 8 plays, 64 yards.
- IND – Mike Cofer 20-yard field goal, 0:27. Jets 17–3. Drive: 11 plays, 73 yards.

Third quarter

- NYJ – Wayne Chrebet 5-yard pass from Boomer Esiason (Nick Lowery kick), 13:14. Jets 24–3. Drive: 4 plays, 24 yards.
- IND – Tony Bennett 32-yard fumble return (Mike Cofer kick), 2:11. Jets 24–10.

Fourth quarter

- IND – Sean Dawkins 15-yard pass from Jim Harbaugh (Mike Cofer kick), 8:46. Jets 24–17. Drive: 12 plays, 80 yards.
- IND – Marshall Faulk 14-yard pass from Jim Harbaugh (Mike Cofer kick), 2:38. Tie 24–24. Drive: 7 plays, 75 yards.

Overtime

- IND – Mike Cofer 52-yard field goal, 10:33. Colts 27–24. Drive: 7 plays, 48 yards.

Top passers

- IND – Craig Erickson – 12/18, 141 yards, INT
- NYJ – Boomer Esiason – 19/30, 198 yards, 2 TD

Top rushers

- IND – Marshall Faulk – 21 rushes, 81 yards
- NYJ – Adrian Murrell – 11 rushes, 52 yards

Top receivers

- IND – Sean Dawkins – 5 receptions, 60 yards, TD
- NYJ – Adrian Murrell – 4 receptions, 68 yards
