= 1995 Miami Dolphins season =

30th season in franchise history; final season for Don Shula

- Head coach: Don Shula
- Offensive coordinator: Gary Stevens
- Defensive coordinator: Tom Olivadotti
- Home stadium: Joe Robbie Stadium

Results
- Record: 9–7
- Division place: 3rd AFC East
- Playoffs: Lost Wild Card Playoffs (at Bills) 22–37
- Pro Bowlers: QB Dan Marino; LT Richmond Webb; G Keith Sims; LB Bryan Cox

The 1995 Miami Dolphins season was the franchise's 30th season, 26th in the National Football League, and 26th and final under head coach Don Shula. The Dolphins finished 9–7 before losing to the Bills in the playoffs.

Until the 2022 NFL season, this marked the last time the Dolphins finished with a top 10 Offense.

== Offseason ==
| Additions | Subtractions |
|---|---|
| DE Steve Emtman (Colts) | SS Tyrone Braxton (Broncos) |
| QB Dan McGwire (Seahawks) | DT Larry Webster (Browns) |
| CB Terrell Buckley (Packers) | RB Aaron Craver (Broncos) |
| DE Trace Armstrong (Bears) | C Jeff Dellenbach (Patriots) |
| WR Gary Clark (Cardinals) | WR Mike Williams (Jaguars) |
| TE Eric Green (Steelers) | TE Keith Jackson (Packers) |

=== 1995 expansion draft ===
Miami Dolphins selected during the expansion draft
| Round | Overall | Name | Position | Expansion team |
|---|---|---|---|---|
| 3 | 5 | Jeff Novak | OG | Jacksonville Jaguars |
| 22 | 43 | Brant Boyer | LB | Jacksonville Jaguars |
| 22 | 44 | Doug Pederson | QB | Carolina Panthers |

=== NFL draft ===
1995 Miami Dolphins draft
| Round | Pick | Player | Position | College | Notes |
| 1 | 25 | Billy Milner | Tackle | Houston | |
| 2 | 53 | Andrew Greene | Guard | Indiana | |
| 4 | 122 | Pete Mitchell | Tight end | Boston College | |
| 5 | 158 | Norman Hand | Defensive tackle | Ole Miss | |
| 6 | 194 | Jeff Kopp | Linebacker | USC | |
| 7 | 233 | Corey Swinson | Defensive tackle | Hampton | |
| 7 | 246 | Shannon Myers | Wide receiver | Lenoir–Rhyne | |
Made roster † Pro Football Hall of Fame * Made at least one Pro Bowl during career

=== Undrafted free agents ===
1995 undrafted free agents of note
| Player | Position | College |
|---|---|---|
| Ontiwaun Carter | Running back | Arizona |
| Travis Cooper | Linebacker | UCF |
| Melvin Crawford | Safety | Hampton |
| Kirby Dar Dar | Wide receiver | Syracuse |
| Seth Dittman | Tackle | Stanford |
| Randy Gatewood | Wide receiver | UNLV |
| Dave Hack | Guard | Maryland |
| Ed Hawthorne | Defensive tackle | Minnesota |
| Jason James | Center | Fresno State |
| Larry Kennedy | Safety | Florida |
| Tarrant Lynch | Fullback | Alabama |
| Lee McClinton | Fullback | New Hampshire |
| Brent Moss | Running back | Wisconsin |
| Joe Planansky | Tight end | Chadron State |
| Burt Thornton | Wide receiver | Purdue |
| Eric Turral | Wide receiver | Florida State |
| Rodney Wilkerson | Linebacker | Georgia Tech |

== Roster ==
1995 Miami Dolphins roster
| Quarterbacks (QB): 19 Bernie Kosar; 13 Dan Marino; 11 Dan McGwire; Running backs (RB): 41 Keith Byars FB; 42 Terry Kirby; 30 Bernie Parmalee; 40 Irving Spikes KR; 49 Robert Wilson; Wide receivers (WR): 84 Gary Clark; 15 Kirby Dar Dar; 80 Irving Fryar; 89 Randal Hill KR; 81 O. J. McDuffie; 87 Mike Williams; Tight ends (TE): 86 Eric Green; 82 Frank Wainright LS; 85 Ronnie Williams | Offensive linemen (OL): 68 Andrew Greene G; 67 Gene McGuire C; 72 Tom McHale G; 79 Billy Milner T; 70 Eric Moore T; 61 Tim Ruddy C; 69 Keith Sims G; 78 Richmond Webb T; 60 Bert Weidner G; Defensive linemen (DL): 93 Trace Armstrong DE; 95 Tim Bowens DT; 90 Marco Coleman DE; 91 Jeff Cross DE; 94 Steve Emtman DT; 98 Norman Hand DT; 74 Ed Hawthorne DT; 99 Chuck Klingbeil DT | Linebackers (LB): 58 Antonio Armstrong OLB; 53 Aubrey Beavers OLB; 51 Bryan Cox OLB; 59 DeWayne Dotson MLB; 50 Dwight Hollier OLB; 52 Jeff Kopp OLB; 55 Chris Singleton OLB; Defensive backs (DB): 28 Gene Atkins FS; 37 J. B. Brown CB; 27 Terrell Buckley CB; 31 Sean Hill CB/S; 38 Calvin Jackson CB; 24 Pat Johnson SS; 25 Louis Oliver FS; 29 Frankie Smith CB; 35 Michael Stewart SS; 23 Troy Vincent CB; Special teams (ST): 17 John Kidd P; 10 Pete Stoyanovich K | Practice squad: 48 Lee McClinton FB; 45 Kenny McEntyre CB; 26 Chico Nelson S; 88 Joe Planansky TE; Reserve: 71 Ethan Albright LS (IR); 77 Kevin Brothen G (IR); 62 Chris Gray G (IR); 73 Ron Heller T (IR); 83 Scott Miller WR (PUP); 14 Shannon Myers WR (IR); Rookies in italics 53 active, 6 reserve, 4 practice squad |

== Regular season ==
=== Schedule ===
| Week | Date | Opponent | Result | Record | Venue | Attendance |
|---|---|---|---|---|---|---|
| 1 | September 3 | **New York Jets** | **W** 52–14 | 1–0 | Pro Player Park | 71,317 |
| 2 | September 10 | at **New England Patriots** | **W** 20–3 | 2–0 | Foxboro Stadium | 60,239 |
| 3 | September 18 | Pittsburgh Steelers | **W** 23–10 | 3–0 | Pro Player Stadium | 72,874 |
| 4 | Bye | | | | | |
| 5 | October 1 | at Cincinnati Bengals | **W** 26–23 | 4–0 | Riverfront Stadium | 52,671 |
| 6 | October 8 | **Indianapolis Colts** | **L** 24–27 (OT) | 4–1 | Pro Player Stadium | 68,471 |
| 7 | October 15 | at New Orleans Saints | **L** 30–33 | 4–2 | Louisiana Superdome | 55,628 |
| 8 | October 22 | at **New York Jets** | **L** 16–17 | 4–3 | Giants Stadium | 67,228 |
| 9 | October 29 | **Buffalo Bills** | **W** 23–6 | 5–3 | Pro Player Stadium | 71,060 |
| 10 | November 5 | at San Diego Chargers | **W** 24–14 | 6–3 | Jack Murphy Stadium | 61,966 |
| 11 | November 12 | **New England Patriots** | **L** 17–34 | 6–4 | Pro Player Stadium | 70,399 |
| 12 | November 20 | San Francisco 49ers | **L** 20–44 | 6–5 | Pro Player Stadium | 73,080 |
| 13 | November 26 | at **Indianapolis Colts** | **L** 28–36 | 6–6 | RCA Dome | 60,414 |
| 14 | December 3 | Atlanta Falcons | **W** 21–20 | 7–6 | Pro Player Stadium | 63,395 |
| 15 | December 11 | Kansas City Chiefs | **W** 13–6 | 8–6 | Pro Player Stadium | 70,321 |
| 16 | December 17 | at **Buffalo Bills** | **L** 20–23 | 8–7 | Rich Stadium | 79,531 |
| 17 | December 24 | at St. Louis Rams | **W** 41–22 | 9–7 | Trans World Dome | 63,876 |
Note: Intra-division opponents are in **bold** text.

=== Standings ===
AFC East
| | W | L | T | PCT | PF | PA | STK |
|---|---|---|---|---|---|---|---|
| ^{(3)} Buffalo Bills | 10 | 6 | 0 | .625 | 350 | 335 | L1 |
| ^{(5)} Indianapolis Colts | 9 | 7 | 0 | .563 | 331 | 316 | W1 |
| ^{(6)} Miami Dolphins | 9 | 7 | 0 | .563 | 398 | 332 | W1 |
| New England Patriots | 6 | 10 | 0 | .375 | 294 | 377 | L2 |
| New York Jets | 3 | 13 | 0 | .188 | 233 | 384 | L4 |

== Playoffs ==
=== AFC Wild Card Game ===
Buffalo Bills 37, Miami Dolphins 22

| Quarter | 1 | 2 | 3 | 4 | Total |
|---|---|---|---|---|---|
| Dolphins | 0 | 0 | 0 | 22 | 22 |
| Bills | 10 | 14 | 3 | 10 | 37 |

at Rich Stadium, Orchard Park, New York

- Game time: 12:30 p.m. EST
- Game weather: 30 °F (−1 °C), cloudy
- Game attendance: 73,103
- Referee: Red Cashion
- TV announcers (ABC): Brent Musburger and Dick Vermeil

Dolphins quarterback Dan Marino completed 33 of 64 passes for 422 yards and two touchdowns, but also threw three interceptions. The Bills used an NFL-playoff record 341 rushing yards to gain a 27–0 lead by the start of the fourth quarter.

=== Don Shula's retirement ===
The week after Miami's playoff loss to Buffalo, Shula announced his retirement. His 347 wins as a head coach, including 257 with the Dolphins, are an NFL record. Shula coached in six Super Bowls, winning two, and in 1972 he led the only unbeaten and untied season in NFL history. Shula was inducted into the Pro Football Hall of Fame in 1997 and is considered one of the greatest coaches in NFL history.

== Awards and honors ==
- Dan Marino, AFC Pro Bowl Selection
- Dan Marino, All-Pro Selection

== Notes and references ==
- Miami Dolphins on Pro Football Reference
- Miami Dolphins on jt-sw.com
