= List of Green Bay Packers first-round draft picks =

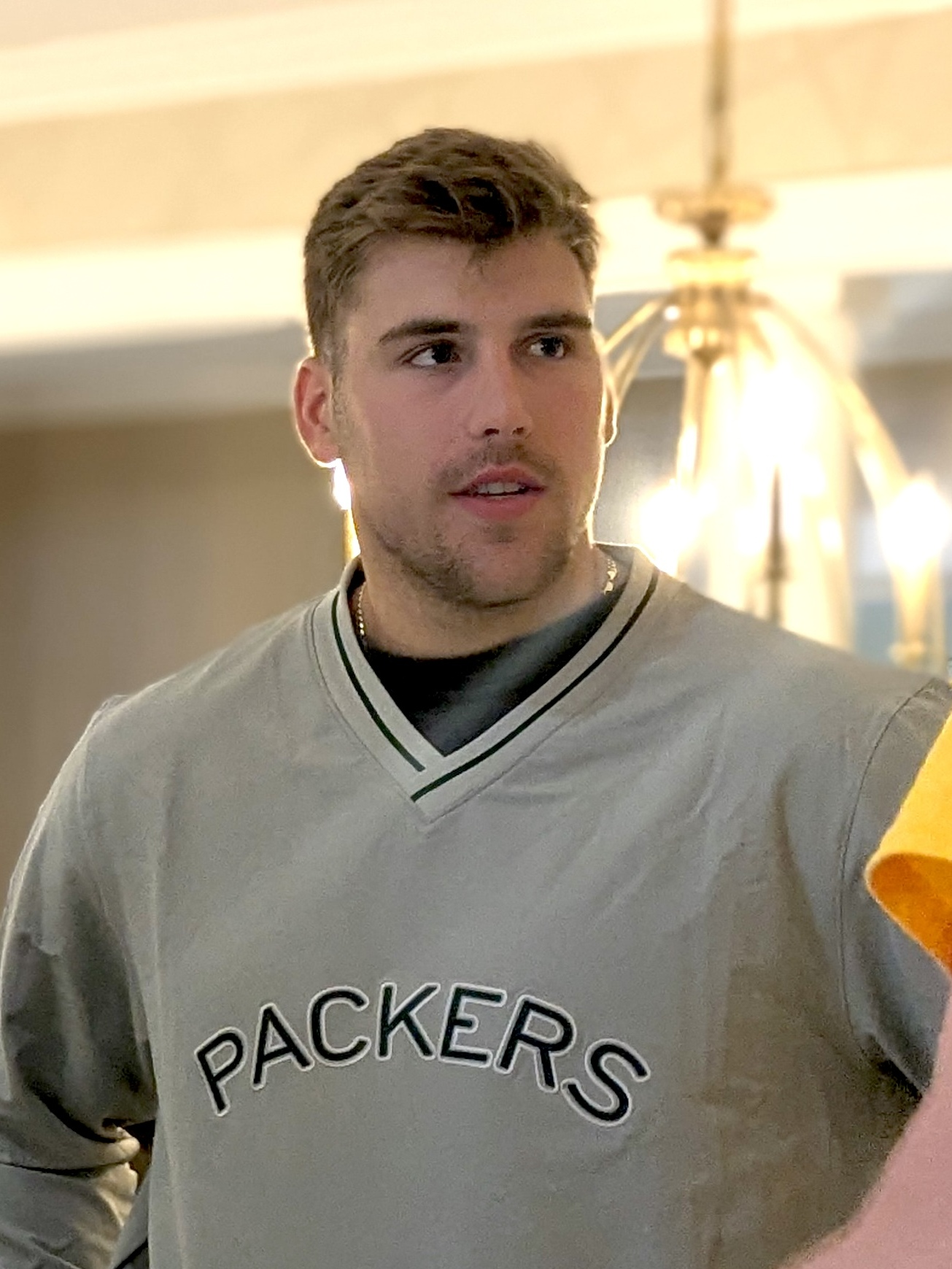
Lukas Van Ness, the Packers 2023 NFL draft selection

The Green Bay Packers are a professional American football team based in Green Bay, Wisconsin. The Packers have competed in the National Football League (NFL) since 1921, two years after their original founding by Curly Lambeau and George Whitney Calhoun. They are members of the Northern Division of the National Football Conference (NFC) and play their home games at Lambeau Field in central Wisconsin.

The NFL draft, officially known as the "NFL Annual Player Selection Meeting", is an annual event which serves as the league's most common source of player recruitment. The draft order is determined based on the previous season's standings; the teams with the worst win–loss records receive the earliest picks. Teams that qualified for the NFL playoffs select after non-qualifiers, and their order depends on how far they advanced, using their regular season record as a tie-breaker. The final two selections in the first round are reserved for the Super Bowl runner-up and champion. Draft picks are tradable and players or other picks can be acquired with them.

The Packers participated in the first ever NFL draft in 1936 and selected Russ Letlow, a guard from the University of San Francisco. The Packers have selected the number one overall pick in the draft twice, choosing Paul Hornung in 1957 and quarterback Randy Duncan in 1959. They have also selected the second overall pick three times and the third overall pick once. On 14 different occasions the Packers have had two selections in the first round, while on four occasions they have had no selections. The team's eight selections from the University of Minnesota are the most chosen by the Packers from one university. Five first round draft picks by the Packers have gone on to be inducted into the Pro Football Hall of Fame (Hornung, Herb Adderley, Dave Robinson, James Lofton, and Sterling Sharpe), while two have won an NFL MVP Award (Hornung and Aaron Rodgers). John Brockington and Willie Buchanon, the team's first round selections in 1971 and 1972 won back-to-back NFL Rookie of the Year Awards (Brockington on offensive, Buchanon on defense), the only Packers' first round selections to win the award. The team's most recent first round selection was Matthew Golden, a wide receiver from Texas, in the 2025 NFL draft.

== Player selections ==
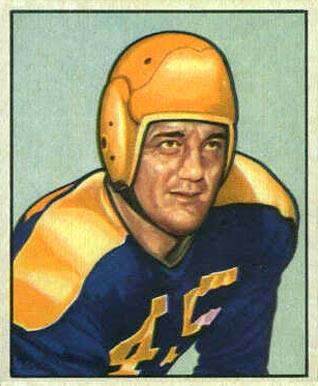
Dick Wildung, the Packers 1943 NFL draft selection

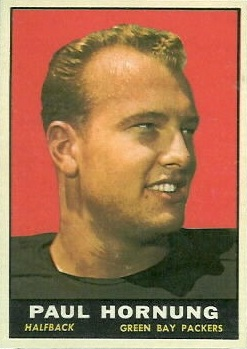
Paul Hornung, the Packers 1957 NFL draft selection

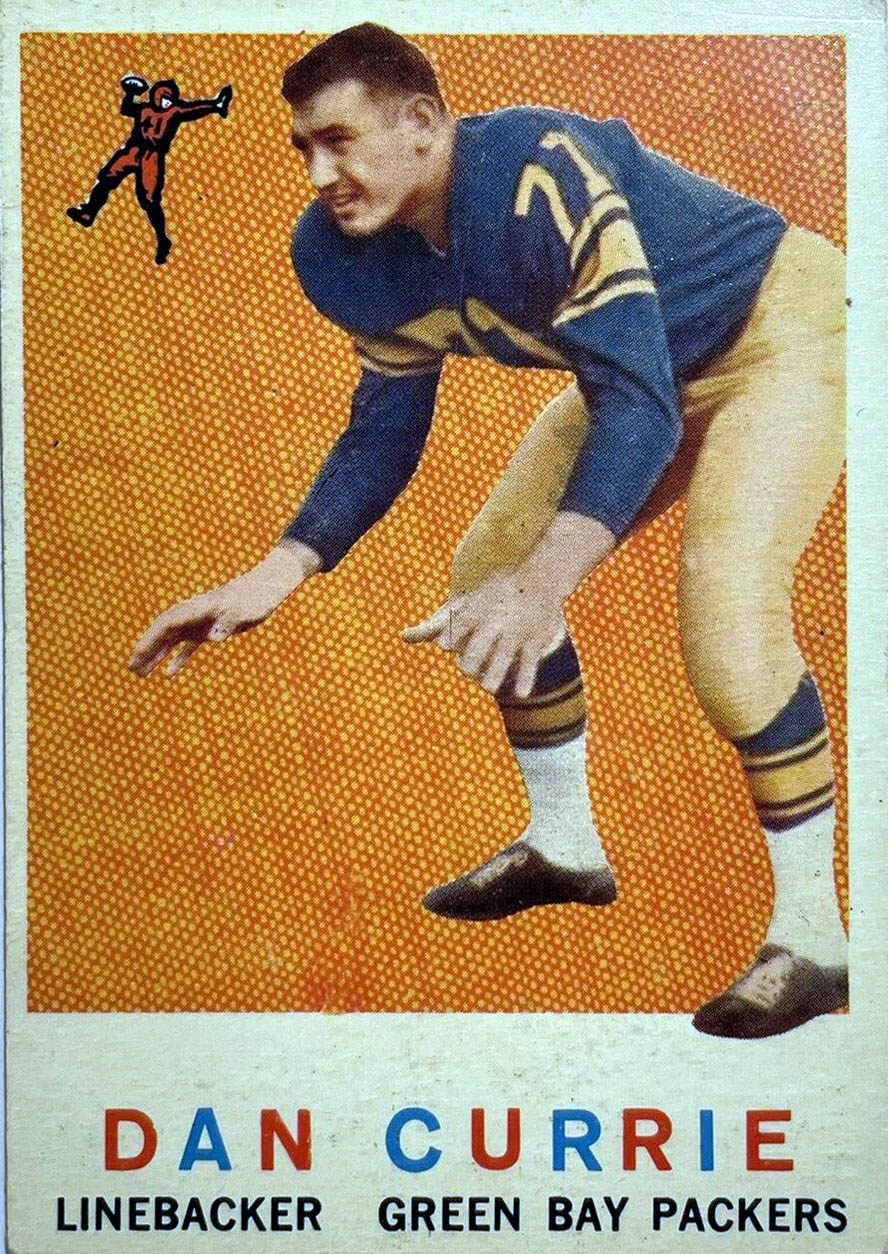
Dan Currie, the Packers 1958 NFL draft selection

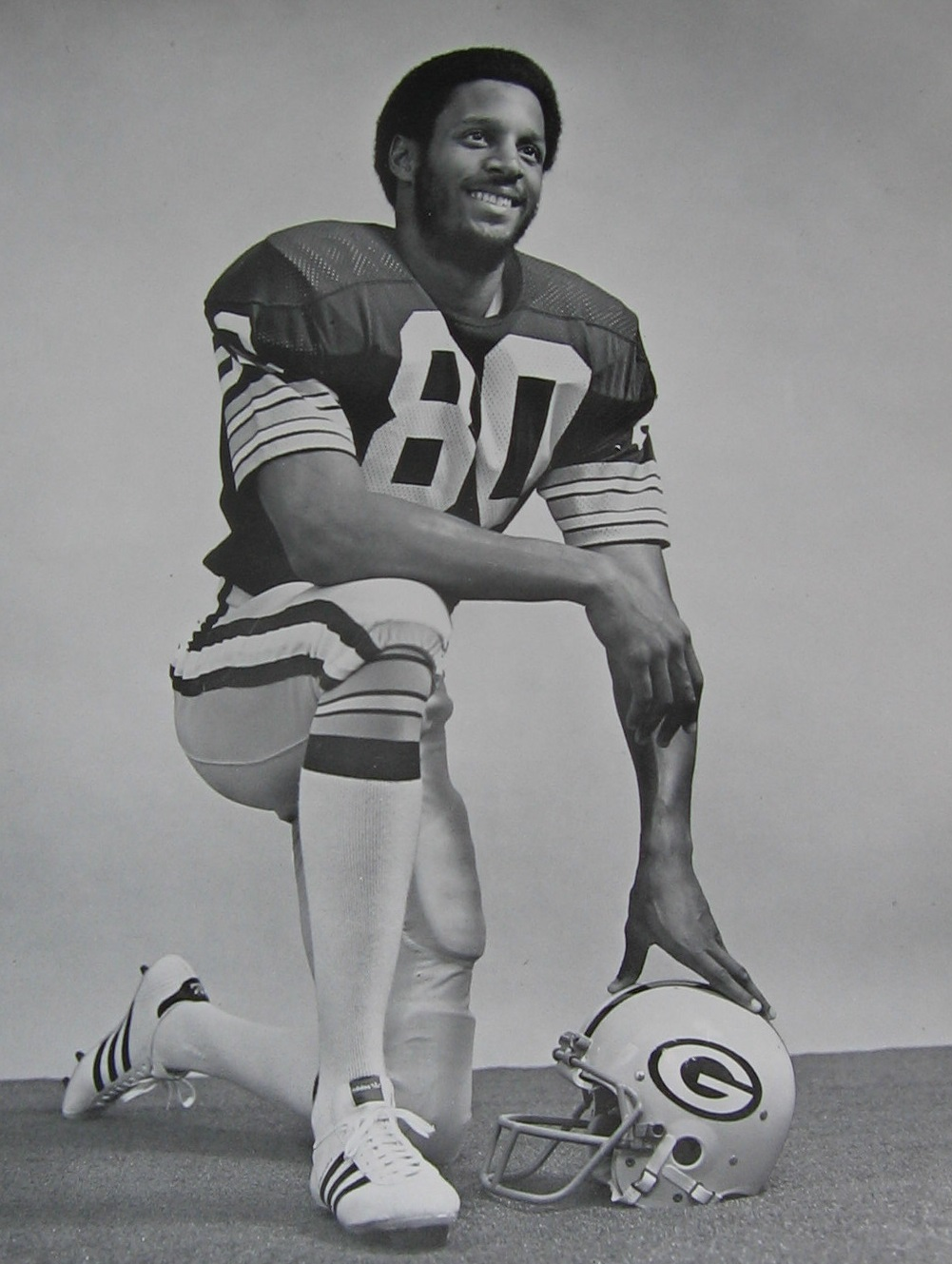
James Lofton, the Packers 1978 NFL draft selection

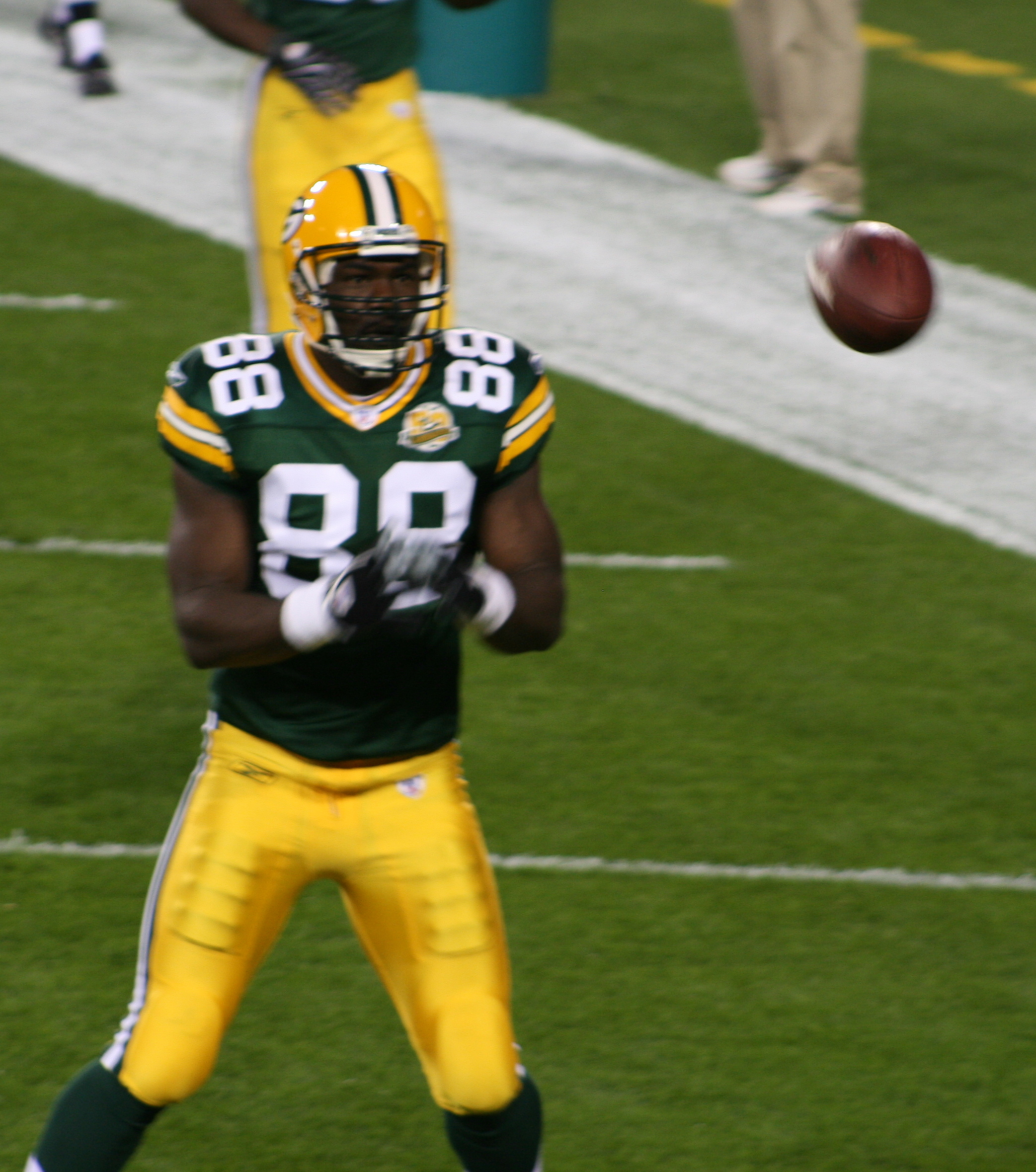
Bubba Franks, the Packers 2000 NFL draft selection

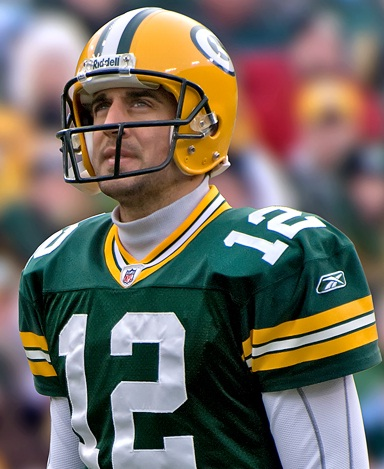
Aaron Rodgers, the Packers 2005 NFL draft selection

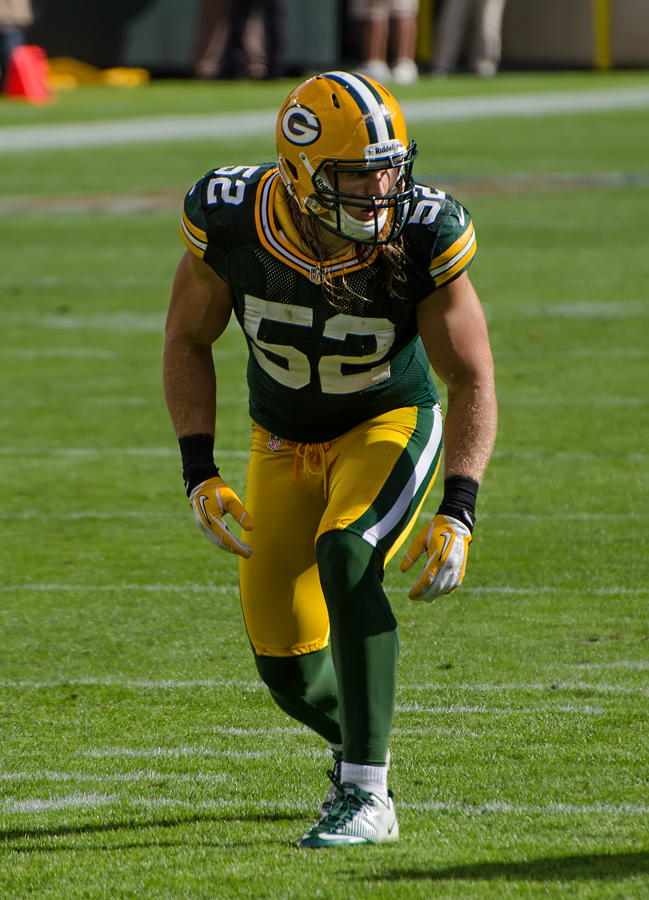
Clay Matthews III, the Packers 2009 NFL draft selection

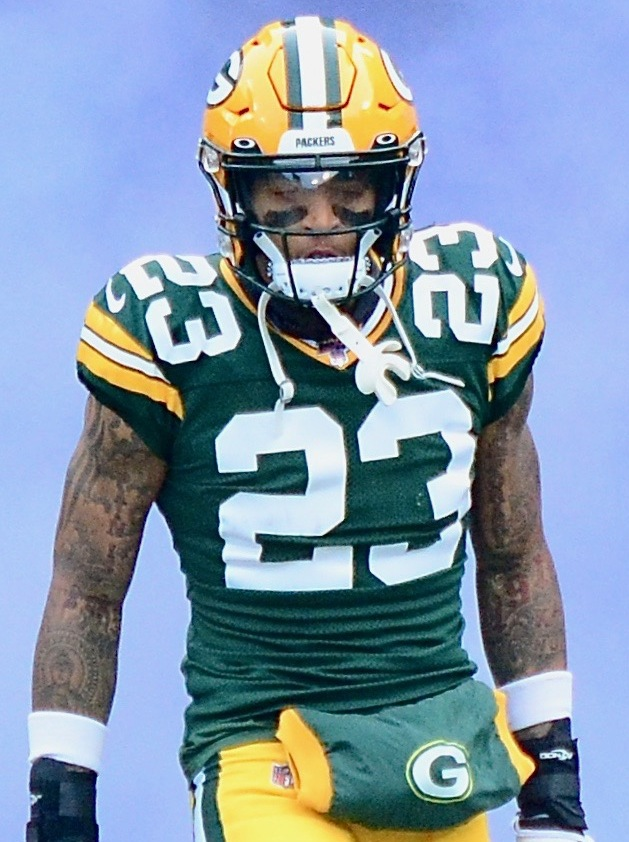
Jaire Alexander, the Packers 2018 NFL draft selection

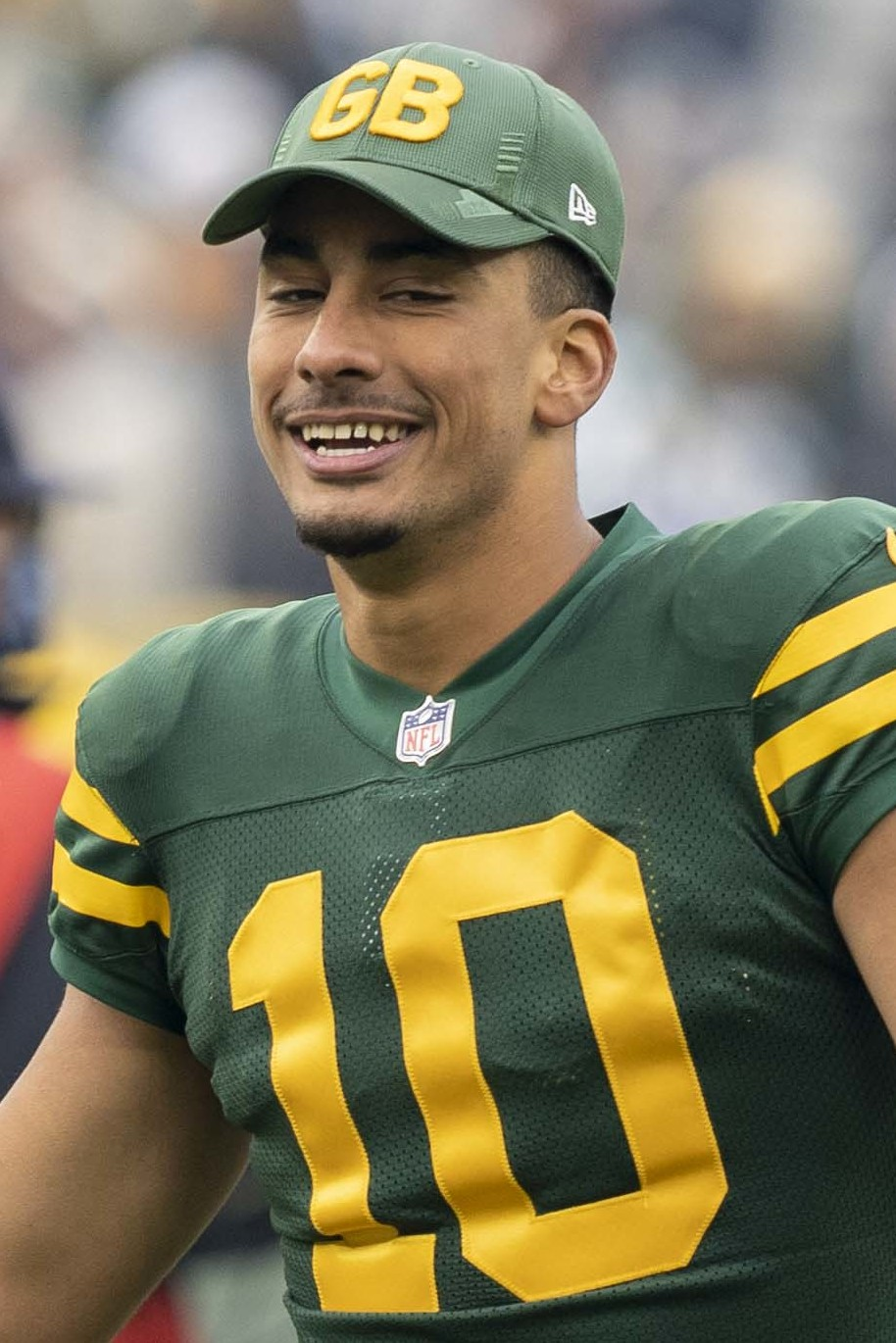
Jordan Love, the Packers 2020 NFL draft selection

Key
^{#}	Inducted into the Green Bay Packers Hall of Fame
‡	Inducted into the Green Bay Packers Hall of Fame and Pro Football Hall of Fame
^{MVP}	Elected as the NFL Most Valuable Player
^{ROY}	Elected as the NFL Rookie of the year
**Bold**	Player is currently active in the NFL

Green Bay Packers first-round draft picks by season
Season	Pick	Player name (Note: This list only includes first-round picks in the annual NFL draft. Thus, Billy Grimes (selected in the first round of the 1950 AAFC dispersal draft) and Buford Jordan (selected in the first round of the 1984 NFL supplemental draft of USFL and CFL players) are not included.)	Position	College	Notes
1936	7	Russ Letlow ^{#}	Guard	San Francisco	
1937	9	Eddie Jankowski ^{#}	Back	Wisconsin	
1938	7	Cecil Isbell ^{#}	Back	Purdue	
1939	9	Larry Buhler	Back	Minnesota	
1940	9	Hal Van Every	Back	Minnesota	
1941	7	George Paskvan	Back	Wisconsin	
1942	9	Urban Odson	Tackle	Minnesota	
1943	8	Dick Wildung ^{#}	Tackle	Minnesota	
1944	7	Merv Pregulman	Guard	Michigan	
1945	11	Walt Schlinkman	Back	Texas Tech	
1946	6	Johnny Strzykalski	Back	Marquette	
1947	6	Ernie Case	Back	UCLA	
1948	7	Earl Girard	Back	Wisconsin	
1949	5	Stan Heath	Back	Nevada	
1950	4	Clayton Tonnemaker	Center	Minnesota	
1951	5	Bob Gain	Tackle	Minnesota	
1952	4	Vito Parilli	Quarterback	Kentucky	
1953	7	Al Carmichael	Halfback	USC	
1954	3	Art Hunter	Tackle	Notre Dame	
1954	4	Veryl Switzer	Back	Kansas State	Packers traded Arnold Galiffa to the New York Giants for Val Joe Walker and a 1954 first-round pick.
1955	5	Tom Bettis	Linebacker	Purdue	
1956	8	Jack Losch	Halfback	Miami (FL)	
1957	1	Paul Hornung ‡ ^{MVP}	Halfback	Notre Dame	The first pick of the draft was awarded via a lottery won by the Packers.
1957	4	Ron Kramer ^{#}	End	Michigan	
1958	3	Dan Currie ^{#}	Linebacker	Michigan State	
1959	1	Randy Duncan	Quarterback	Iowa	
1960	5	Tom Moore	Running back	Vanderbilt	
1961	12	Herb Adderley ‡	Cornerback	Michigan State	
1962	14	Earl Gros	Running back	LSU	
1963	14	Dave Robinson ‡	Linebacker	Penn State	
1964	13	Lloyd Voss	Defensive end	Nebraska	
1965	7	Donny Anderson ^{#}	Running back	Texas Tech	Packers traded Jim Ringo and Earl Gros to the Philadelphia Eagles for Lee Roy Caffey and a 1965 first-round pick.
1965	10	Larry Elkins	Wide receiver	Baylor	
1966	9	Jim Grabowski	Running back	Illinois	The Detroit Lions were required to provide the Packers a 1966 first-round pick as compensation for signing former Packer Ron Kramer.
1966	13	Gale Gillingham ^{#}	Guard	Minnesota	
1967	9	Bob Hyland	Guard	Boston College	Packers traded Lloyd Voss and Tony Jeter to the Pittsburgh Steelers for a 1967 first-round pick.
1967	25	Don Horn	Quarterback	San Diego State	
1968	5	Fred Carr ^{#}	Linebacker	UTEP	The Packers received a first-round pick from the New Orleans Saints as compensation for the Saints signing Packers' fullback Jim Taylor.
1968	26	Bill Lueck	Guard	Arizona	
1969	12	Rich Moore	Defensive tackle	Villanova	
1970	2	Mike McCoy	Defensive tackle	Notre Dame	Packers traded Bob Hyland, Elijah Pitts and Lee Roy Caffey to the Chicago Bears for a 1970 first-round pick.
1970	16	Rich McGeorge	Tight end	Elon	
1971	9	John Brockington ^{#} ^{ROY}	Running back	Ohio State	Packers traded Don Horn and their 1971 first round pick to the Denver Broncos for Alden Roche and a 1971 first-round pick.
1972	7	Willie Buchanon ^{#} ^{ROY}	Cornerback	San Diego State	
1972	11	Jerry Tagge	Quarterback	Nebraska	Packers traded Kevin Hardy to the San Diego Chargers for a 1972 first-round pick.
1973	21	Barry Smith	Wide receiver	Florida State	
1974	12	Barty Smith	Running back	Richmond	
1975	No pick				Packers traded their 1975 first-round, second-round and third-round picks, and their 1976 first-round and second-round picks to the St. Louis Rams for John Hadl.
1976	23	Mark Koncar	Tackle	Colorado	Packers traded Ted Hendricks to the Oakland Raiders for a 1976 first-round pick and a 1977 first-round pick.
1977	9	Mike Butler	Defensive end	Kansas	
1977	28	Ezra Johnson ^{#}	Defensive end	Morris Brown	Packers traded Ted Hendricks to the Oakland Raiders for a 1976 first-round pick and a 1977 first-round pick.
1978	6	James Lofton ‡	Wide receiver	Stanford	
1978	26	John Anderson ^{#}	Linebacker	Michigan	Packers traded Mike McCoy to the Oakland Raiders for Herb McMath, a 1978 first round pick and a 1979 fourth-round pick.
1979	15	Eddie Lee Ivery	Running back	Georgia Tech	
1980	4	Bruce Clark	Defensive tackle	Penn State	
1980	26	George Cumby	Linebacker	Oklahoma	Packers traded Willie Buchanon to the San Diego Chargers for a 1980 first-round pick and a 1979 seventh-round pick.
1981	6	Rich Campbell	Quarterback	California	
1982	22	Ron Hallstrom	Guard	Iowa	Packers traded Aundra Thompson, their 1982 first-round and second-round picks, their 1983 first-round pick and their 1984 second-round pick to the San Diego Chargers for John Jefferson and a 1982 first-round pick.
1983	11	Tim Lewis	Cornerback	Pittsburgh	Packers traded Bruce Clark to the New Orleans Saints for a 1983 first-round pick.
1984	12	Alphonso Carreker	Defensive end	Florida State	
1985	7	Ken Ruettgers	Tackle	USC	Packers traded their 1985 first-round and second-round picks to the Buffalo Bills for a 1985 first-round pick and 1986 fourth-round pick.
1986	No pick				Packers traded their 1986 first-round pick and a 1987 conditional fifth round pick to the San Diego Chargers for Mossy Cade.
1987	4	Brent Fullwood	Running back	Auburn	
1988	7	Sterling Sharpe ^{‡}	Wide receiver	South Carolina	
1989	2	Tony Mandarich	Tackle	Michigan State	
1990	18	Tony Bennett	Linebacker	Mississippi	Packers traded their 1989 second-round and fifth-round picks to the Cleveland Browns for Herman Fontenot, a 1989 third-round and fifth-round pick, and a 1990 first-round pick.
1990	19	Darrell Thompson	Running back	Minnesota	
1991	19	Vinnie Clark	Cornerback	Ohio State	Packers traded their 1991 first-round pick to the Philadelphia Eagles for a 1991 first-round pick and a 1992 first-round pick.
1992	5	Terrell Buckley	Cornerback	Florida State	
1993	15	Wayne Simmons	Linebacker	Clemson	
1993	29	George Teague	Safety	Alabama	Packers traded two 1993 second-round picks, their 1993 fourth-round and 1993 eighth-round pick to the Dallas Cowboys for their 1993 first-round and fourth-round picks.
1994	16	Aaron Taylor	Guard	Notre Dame	Packers traded their 1994 first-round and third-round picks to the Miami Dolphins for a 1994 first-round pick.
1995	32	Craig Newsome	Cornerback	Arizona State	Packers traded their 1995 second-round and sixth-round picks to the Carolina Panthers for their 1995 first-round, third-round and sixth-round picks.
1996	27	John Michels	Tackle	USC	
1997	30	Ross Verba	Guard	Iowa	
1998	19	Vonnie Holliday	Defensive end	North Carolina	Packers traded their 1998 first-round and second-round picks to the Miami Dolphins for a 1998 first-round pick.
1999	25	Antuan Edwards	Safety	Clemson	
2000	14	Bubba Franks	Tight end	Miami (FL)	
2001	10	Jamal Reynolds	Defensive end	Florida State	Packers traded Matt Hasselbeck and their 2001 first-round and seventh-round picks to the Seattle Seahawks for their 2001 first-round and third-round picks.
2002	20	Javon Walker	Wide receiver	Florida State	Packers traded their 2002 first-round and third-round picks to the Seattle Seahawks for their 2002 first-round and fifth round picks.
2003	29	Nick Barnett	Linebacker	Oregon State	
2004	25	Ahmad Carroll	Cornerback	Arkansas	
2005	24	**Aaron Rodgers** ^{MVP}	Quarterback	California	
2006	5	A. J. Hawk	Linebacker	Ohio State	
2007	16	Justin Harrell	Defensive tackle	Tennessee	
2008	No pick				Packers traded their 2008 first-round pick to the New York Jets for their 2008 second-round and fourth-round picks.
2009	9	B. J. Raji	Defensive tackle	Boston College	
2009	26	Clay Matthews III ^{#}	Linebacker	USC	Packers traded their 2009 second-round and two third-round picks to the New England Patriots for their 2009 first round and fifth-round picks.
2010	23	Bryan Bulaga	Tackle	Iowa	
2011	32	Derek Sherrod	Tackle	Mississippi State	
2012	28	Nick Perry	Defensive end	USC	
2013	26	Datone Jones	Defensive end	UCLA	
2014	21	Ha Ha Clinton-Dix	Safety	Alabama	
2015	30	Damarious Randall	Safety	Arizona State	
2016	27	**Kenny Clark**	Defensive tackle	UCLA	
2017	No pick				Packers traded their 2017 first-round pick to the Cleveland Browns for their 2017 second-round and fourth-round picks.
2018	18	Jaire Alexander	Cornerback	Louisville	Packers traded their 2018 first-round, third-round and sixth round picks to the Seattle Seahawks for their 2018 first-round and seventh round picks.
2019	12	**Rashan Gary**	Defensive end	Michigan	
2019	21	**Darnell Savage**	Safety	Maryland	Packers traded their 2019 first-round and two fourth-round picks to the Seattle Seahawks for a 2019 first-round pick.
2020	26	**Jordan Love**	Quarterback	Utah State	Packers traded their 2020 first-round and fourth-round picks to the Miami Dolphins for a 2020 first-round pick.
2021	29	**Eric Stokes**	Cornerback	Georgia	
2022	22	**Quay Walker**	Linebacker	Georgia	Packers traded Davante Adams to the Las Vegas Raiders for their 2022 first-round and second-round picks.
2022	28	**Devonte Wyatt**	Defensive end	Georgia	
2023	13	**Lukas Van Ness**	Defensive end	Iowa	Packers traded Aaron Rodgers and their 2023 first-round and fifth-round picks to the New York Jets for a 2023 first-round, second-round, and sixth-round pick and a conditional 2024 second-round pick.
2024	25	**Jordan Morgan**	Tackle	Arizona	
2025	23	**Matthew Golden**	Wide receiver	Texas	
2026	No pick				Packers traded their 2026 and 2027 first-round picks to the Dallas Cowboys for Micah Parsons in 2025.

== See also ==
- Lists of Green Bay Packers players
