= Sam Madison =

American football player and coach (born 1974)

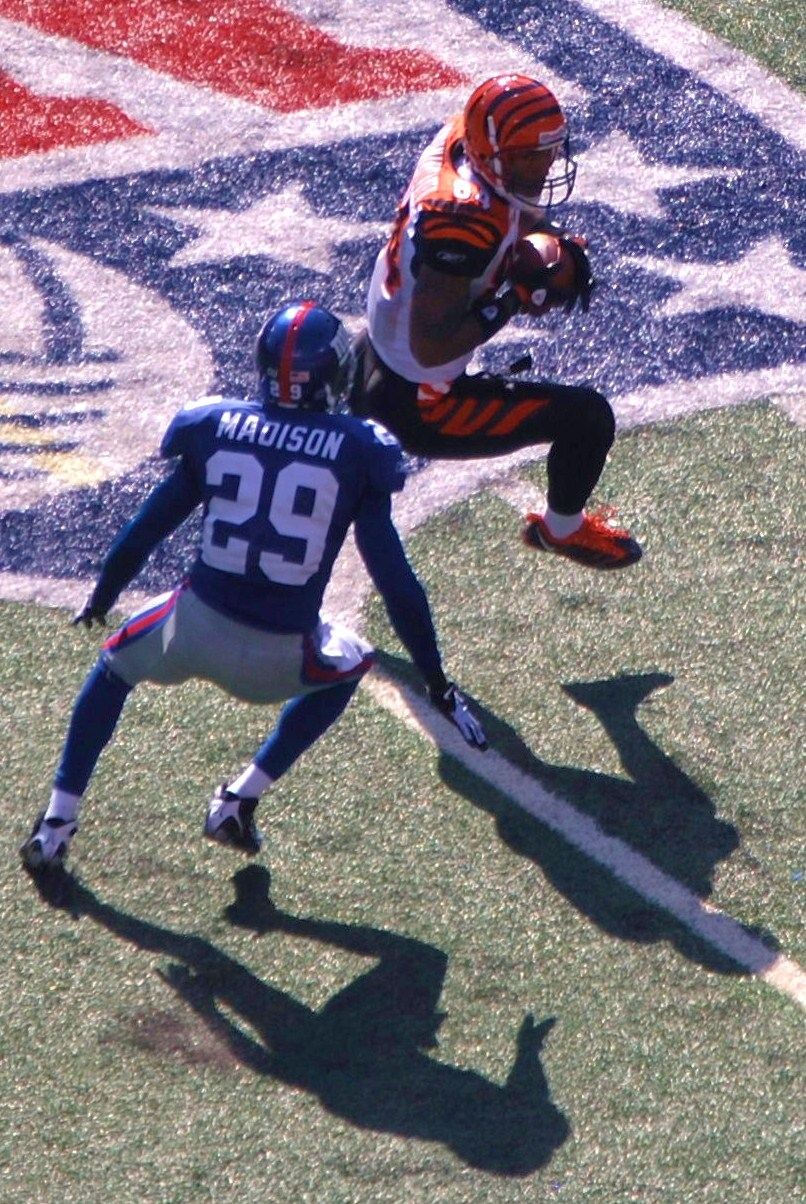

No. 22, 29
- Position: Cornerback

Personal information
- Born: April 23, 1974 (age 52); Thomasville, Georgia, U.S.
- Listed height: 5 ft 11 in (1.80 m)
- Listed weight: 180 lb (82 kg)

Career information
- High school: FAMU Developmental Research (Tallahassee, Florida)
- College: Louisville (1992–1996)
- NFL draft: 1997: 2nd round, 44th overall pick

Career history

Playing
- Miami Dolphins (1997–2005); New York Giants (2006–2008)

Coaching
- Kansas City Chiefs (2019–2021) Secondary & cornerbacks coach; Miami Dolphins (2022–2023) Cornerbacks coach & pass game specialist

Awards and highlights
- As player: Super Bowl champion (XLII); 2× First-team All-Pro (1999, 2000); 2× Second-team All-Pro (1998, 2001); 4× Pro Bowl (1999–2002); NFL Interceptions co-leader (1999); Dolphins Walk of Fame (2014); First-team All-American (1996); Louisville Cardinals Ring of Honor; As coach: Super Bowl champion (LIV)

Career NFL statistics
- Tackles: 481
- Sacks: 2.0
- Forced fumbles: 10
- Fumble recoveries: 6
- Interceptions: 38
- Defensive touchdowns: 3
- Stats at Pro Football Reference

Samuel Adolphus Madison Jr. (born April 23, 1974) is an American former professional football player who was a cornerback in the National Football League (NFL). He played college football for the Louisville Cardinals, and was selected by the Miami Dolphins in the second round of the 1997 NFL draft. A four-time Pro Bowl selection, Madison also played for the New York Giants. He has won two Super Bowls, Super Bowl XLII as a player with the Giants and Super Bowl LIV as an assistant coach with the Chiefs.

== Early life ==
Madison attended Florida A&M University Developmental Research School where he played wide receiver and defensive back. Aside from football he also lettered in basketball, baseball and track and field.

== College career ==
Madison played college football for the University of Louisville. Madison was a three-year starter for the Cardinals and set the school records for interceptions with 16 and passes defended with 44. As a junior, he earned third-team All-America selection after recording 65 tackles, two sacks, 13 passes defensed and seven interceptions. As a senior, he was named a second-team All-America and first-team All-Conference USA after finishing with 52 tackles, two sacks, six interceptions and 16 passes defensed.

== Professional career ==
=== Pre-draft ===
He participated at the NFL Scouting Combine and performed all of the positional and combined drills. Madison also took part in Louisville's Pro Day and improved his time in the 40–yard dash. Madison stated that during the week leading up to the draft he continually had conversations and spoke with the Pittsburgh Steelers and Philadelphia Eagles, as both showed heavy interest into selecting him. The Miami Dolphins never spoke to him leading up to the day of the draft and never showed any inkling of possibly selecting him.

Pre-draft measurables
Height	Weight	Arm length	Hand span	40-yard dash	10-yard split	20-yard split	20-yard shuttle	Three-cone drill	Vertical jump	Broad jump	Bench press
5 ft 11 1/8 in (1.81 m)	181 lb (82 kg)	31 7/8 in (0.81 m)	8 1/2 in (0.22 m)	4.61 s	1.69 s	2.72 s	4.16 s	7.19 s	36.5 in (0.93 m)	9 ft 11 in (3.02 m)	8 reps
All values from NFL Combine

=== Miami Dolphins ===
==== 1997 ====
The Miami Dolphins selected Madison in the second round (44th overall) of the 1997 NFL draft. He was the eighth cornerback selected and the first of four players that were selected from Louisville in 1997. Among the cornerbacks drafted before him, Madison is the only one to have both Pro Bowl honors and a Super Bowl ring and is also the only one with more than one Pro Bowl. He has the second most Pro Bowl selections (×4) amongst all of the cornerbacks in the entire 1997 NFL Draft and is one of four Pro Bowl cornerbacks, joining first-round pick (3rd overall) Shawn Springs (×1), third-round pick (66th overall) Ronde Barber (×5), and sixth-round pick (169th overall) Al Harris (×2). All four players have appeared in at least 150 games throughout their careers.

On June 16, 1997, the Dolphins signed Madison to a four–year, $2.20 million rookie contract that included a signing bonus of $725,000. He entered training camp slated to be the No. 3 outside cornerback under defensive coordinator George Hill. Head coach Jimmy Johnson named Madison a backup and listed him as the third cornerback on the depth chart to begin the season, behind entrenched starters Terrell Buckley and Calvin Jackson.

On August 31, 1997, Madison made his professional regular season debut during the Miami Dolphins' home-opener against the Indianapolis Colts as they won 10–16. In Week 6, he set a season-high with two forced fumbles as the Dolphins defeated the Kansas City Chiefs 14–17. On November 23, 1997, Madison earned his first career start as the No. 2 starting cornerback, in place of Calvin Jackson, who started at free safety after George Teague was benched. He set a season-high with six combined tackles (four solo) as the Dolphins lost 24–27 at the New England Patriots. On November 30, 1997, Madison recorded two solo tackles, set a season-high with two pass deflections, and had his first career interception on a pass by Jeff George to wide receiver Tim Brown during a 34–16 victory at the Oakland Raiders. He was inactive in Week 16 during the Dolphins 0–41 loss at the Indianapolis Colts due to an ankle injury. He finished his rookie season with 21 combined tackles (16 solo), five pass deflections, two forced fumbles, and one interception in 14 games and three starts.

The Miami Dolphins finished second in the AFC East with a 9–7 record in 1997 to earn a Wild-Card position. On December 28, 1997, Madison started in his first career playoff game and recorded two combined tackles (one solo) as the Dolphins lost 3–17 at the New England Patriots in the AFC Wild-Card Game.

==== 1998 ====
The Miami Dolphins selected Patrick Surtain in the second-round (44th overall) in 1998. Coincidentally, they both were selected 44th overall in back-to-back drafts. They would become widely regarded as one of the NFL's top cornerback tandems for the majority of their seven–season partnership. (1998–2004) Defensive coordinator George Hill chose to fully transition Calvin Jackson to strong safety so he take over the starting role he began to play at the end of the previous season, following the decision to bench both Corey Harris and George Teague. Head coach Jimmy Johnson named Madison as Calvin Jackson's replacement as the No. 2 starting cornerback and paired him with Terrell Buckley to start the season, along with nickelback Patrick Surtain.

In Week 3, Madison made two tackles, set a season-high with five pass deflections, and set a season-high with two interceptions off passes thrown by Kordell Stewart as the Dolphins defeated the Pittsburgh Steelers 0–21. In Week 9, he set a season-high with five combined tackles (four solo) and had one pass break-up during a 24–30 loss at the Buffalo Bills. The following game, Madison had one solo tackle, two pass deflections, and intercepted a pass by rookie Peyton Manning to wide receiver Marvin Harrison as the Dolphins defeated the Indianapolis Colts 27–14 in Week 10. On November 23, 1998, Madison made one solo tackle, one pass deflection, and tied his season-high of two interceptions on pass attempts thrown by Drew Bledsoe during a 23–26 loss at the New England Patriots. The following week, he made three tackles, one pass deflection, an interception, and had his first career sack on Kerry Collins as the Dolphins defeated the New Orleans Saints 10–30 in Week 13. In Week 14, Madison made three solo tackles, four pass deflections, and had his seventh interception on a pass thrown by Donald Hollas to tight end Rickey Dudley during a 27–17 victory at the Oakland Raiders. This marked his third consecutive game with an interception with four over that three game span. On December 23, 1998, Madison made five combined tackles (three solo), one pass deflection, and helped secure a 21–31 victory against the Denver Broncos by intercepting a pass by John Elway to wide receiver Rod Smith in the fourth quarter. He started all 16 games and finished with a total of 44 combined tackles (31 solo), made a career-high 20 pass deflections, and set a career-high with eight interceptions. Madison and Terrell Buckley set a new franchise record for most combined interceptions by a cornerback duo in a single season with 16 total after each of them had eight interceptions in 1998.

==== 1999 ====
He entered training camp slated to remain a starting cornerback. Head coach Jimmy Johnson named Madison and Terrell Buckley the starting cornerbacks with Patrick Surtain as their primary backup. On September 19, 1999, Madison made two solo tackles, two pass deflections, and also intercepted two passes thrown by Jake Plummer as the Dolphins defeated the Arizona Cardinals 16–19. In Week 5, he had five solo tackles, one pass deflection, and led the Dolphins to a last minute comeback victory at the Indianapolis Colts by tackling Peyton Manning in the endzone for a safety with 1:58 remaining, while they were down 27–31. It was the first and only safety of Madison's career. It would lead to a two–yard touchdown pass from Dan Marino to wide receiver Oronde Gadsden to gain a 34–31 lead with 27 seconds remaining. Terrell Buckley injured his ankle against the Colts and was inactive during a 31–30 victory at the New England Patriots in Week 6, as he was replaced by Patrick Surtain. On November 7, 1999, Madison made four solo tackles, four pass deflections, and set a career-high with three interceptions on pass attempts thrown by Steve McNair as the Dolphins routed the Tennessee Titans 0–17. In Week 11, he set a season-high with seven combined tackles (three solo), made one pass break-up, and intercepted a pass by Drew Bledsoe to tight end Ben Coates during a 17–27 win against the New England Patriots. Defensive coordinator George Hill chose to bench Terrell Buckley prior to Week 13 and officially named Patrick Surtain the No. 2 starting cornerback for the remainder of the season. Terrell Buckley lost his starting role after was beat for a 68–yard touchdown from Drew Bledsoe to Shawn Jefferson in Week 11 and Troy Aikman three a 65–yard touchdown to Raghib Ismail in Week 12. Madison and Patrick Surtain would start alongside one another for the last five games. In Week 13, he made one solo tackle, one pass deflection, and had a pick-six following an interception on a pass by Peyton Manning to wide receiver Terrence Wilkins during a 37–34 loss to the Indianapolis Colts.

On December 18, 1999, the Miami Dolphins signed Madison to a new eight-year, $42.60 million contract extension that included an initial signing bonus of $11 million. The contract restructured his rookie contract with one year remaining following the end of this season, while adding a six-year extension. His deal became the largest in franchise history, surpassing Dan Marino. Ge started all 16 games for the second season in-a-row and finished with 50 combined tackles (43 solo), made 12 pass deflections, seven interceptions, had one forced fumble, one sack, a safety, and scored one touchdown. His seven interceptions tied for the league lead with four others, including James Hasty (KC), Donnie Abraham (TB), Troy Vincent (PHI), and Rod Woodson (BAL). He was selected to the 2000 Pro Bowl, marking the first Pro Bowl of his career.

==== 2000 ====
On January 16, 2000, Miami Dolphins' head coach Jimmy Johnson officially announced his retirement from coaching citing burnout. Associate head coach Dave Wannstedt was promoted to head coach in his place and fired defensive coordinator George Hill after three seasons. Madison entered training camp slated as the de facto No. 1 starting cornerback under new defensive coordinator Jim Bates. Following the departure of Terrell Buckley, Patrick Surtain competed against Terrance Shaw to take over the other starting cornerback role. Head coach Jim Bates named him the No. 1 starting cornerback to begin the season and paired him with Patrick Surtain and rookie Ben Kelly at nickelback.

On September 3, 2000, Madison started in the Miami Dolphins' home-opener against the Seattle Seahawks and made three combined tackles (two solo), two pass deflections, and set a season-high with two interceptions on passes thrown by Jon Kitna during a 0–23 victory. In Week 6, Madison had two combined tackles, one pass break-up, and returned a fumble he recovered, that was forced on running back Sammy Morris by teammate Patrick Surtain, for a 20–yard touchdown as the Dolphins defeated the Buffalo Bills 13–22. In Week 16, he set a season-high with five combined tackles (four solo) during a 13–20 loss at the Indianapolis Colts. He started all 16 games for the third consecutive season and recorded 39 combined tackles (29 solo), 12 pass deflections, five interceptions, two forced fumbles, two fumble recoveries, and one touchdown. He was selected to appear in the 2001 Pro Bowl.

==== 2001 ====
The Miami Dolphins selected Jamar Fletcher in the first round (26th overall) of the 2001 NFL draft. They drafted Fletcher planning for him to take over at nickelback after rookie Ben Kelly was unsuccessful, forcing Patrick Surtain to cover the slot throughout the 2000 NFL season. On September 9, 2001, Madison started in the Dolphins' season-opener at the Tennessee Titans and set a season-high with four solo tackles, made two pass deflections, and intercepted a pass by Steve McNair to wide receiver Kevin Dyson during a 31–23 victory. In Week 9, Madison made one solo tackle, two pass deflections, and intercepted a pass by Peyton Manning to wide receiver Marvin Harrison, who wrestled Madison and threw him to the turf after, causing a back injury that caused him to immediately exit the 27–24 victory at the Indianapolis Colts in the second quarter. It was confirmed that Madison had separated his shoulder and he subsequently missed the next three games (Weeks 10–12), ending a 62–game streak of consecutive starts. In Week 16, he recorded two solo tackles and set a season-high with four pass deflections as the Dolphins defeated the Atlanta Falcons 21–14. He finished with 25 combined tackles (18 solo), 13 pass deflections, and two interceptions in 13 games and 13 starts. He was voted to the 2002 Pro Bowl, marking his third consecutive appearance.

==== 2002 ====
He returned as the starting cornerback to begin the season along with Patrick Surtain. In Week 6, Madison made one tackle, set a season-high with two pass deflections, and intercepted a pass by Tom Brady to wide receiver Donald Hayes as the Dolphins defeated the New England Patriots 13–26. The following week, he set a season-high with five solo tackles, had a pass break-up, and intercepted a pass by Brian Griese to wide receiver Rod Smith during a 24–22 victory at the Denver Broncos in Week 6. In Week 16, he made four solo tackles, one pass deflection, and picked off a pass by Daunte Culpepper to wide receiver Chris Walsh during a 17–20 loss at the Minnesota Vikings. He started all 16 games throughout the 2002 NFL season and finished with 34 combined tackles (24 solo), 11 pass deflections, and three interceptions. He was voted to his fourth Pro Bowl and was selected to play in the 2003 Pro Bowl alongside Patrick Surtain.

==== 2003 ====
He retained his role as the No. 1 starting cornerback to start the season, appearing alongside Patrick Surtain and the returning Terrell Buckley. In Week 5, he set a season-high with seven combined tackles (six solo) and had one pass break-up during a 23–10 win at the New York Giants. On October 12, 2003, Madison made six solo tackles, two pass deflections, set a season-high with two interceptions, recovered a fumble, and returned an interception thrown by Byron Leftwich to wide receiver Troy Edwards during a 24–10 win at the Jacksonville Jaguars. In Week 11, he had three solo tackles, two pass deflections, and intercepted a pass by Anthony Wright to wide receiver Marcus Robinson as the Dolphins defeated the Baltimore Ravens 6–9. He started all 16 games throughout the 2003 NFL season and recorded 50 combined tackles (47 solo), ten pass deflections, three interceptions, two fumble recoveries, and scored one touchdown.

==== 2004 ====
On March 9, 2004, the Miami Dolphins and Madison agreed to restructure his contract, with four years remaining, saving about $3 million in cap space for 2004. Madison agreed to surrender $10 million of his contract over the final four years.

On December 25, 2004, the Miami Dolphins announced the hiring of Nick Saban as their new head coach.

==== 2005 ====
On April 15, 2005, the Miami Dolphins traded Patrick Surtain to the Kansas City Chiefs. Defensive coordinator Richard Smith had candidates Will Poole, Reggie Howard, and Mario Edwards to replace Patrick Surtain as the No. 2 starting cornerback alongside Madison. The frontrunner for the role was seen as Will Poole until he sustained a torn ACL only weeks after Patrick Surtain was traded. Head coach Nick Saban named Madison and Reggie Howard as the starting cornerbacks to begin the season.

He was inactive during a 21–6 win at the New Orleans Saints in Week 8 due to a hip pointer injury. In Week 12, Madison set a season-high with seven combined tackles (six solo) during a 33–21 victory at the Oakland Raiders. On December 4, 2005, he made two solo tackles, a pass deflection, and picked off a pass by J. P. Losman to wide receiver Josh Reed as the Dolphins defeated the Buffalo Bills 24–23. In Week 16, Madison made three combined tackles (two solo), tied his season-high of two pass deflections, and intercepted a pass by Steve McNair to wide receiver Drew Bennett during a 24–10 victory against the Tennessee Titans. He finished the 2005 NFL season with 56 combined tackles (46 solo), 12 pass deflections, and two interceptions in 15 games and 15 starts.

On March 1, 2006, the Miami Dolphins released Madison in order to save $2.62 million on their salary cap. At the start of the offseason, Madison stated he would refuse to restructure his contract and it would probably lead to his release. Weeks later, he alluded he'd possibly agree to restructure his contract, but no agreement was met. Following his release, the Dolphins would sign Will Allen and Andre Goodman. They also selected Jason Allen in the first round (16th overall) of the 2006 NFL draft.

Madison made the Pro Bowl for four straight years from 1999 to 2002. For much of his career as a Miami Dolphin, Sam Madison played alongside fellow cornerback Patrick Surtain. During their time together, Madison and Surtain were one of the most prolific cornerback tandems in NFL history, posting a combined 697 tackles, 7.5 sacks, 60 interceptions, and 2 touchdowns.

=== New York Giants ===
==== 2006 ====
On March 10, 2006, the New York Giants signed Madison to a four–year, $7.20 million contract that included an initial signing bonus of $2.00 million. He was an immediate candidate to be the No. 1 starting cornerback following the departures of Will Allen and William James. On March 19, 2006, the Miami Dolphins signed Will Allen, making one another their replacements. He entered training camp as a candidate to become a starting cornerback, but also faced competition from Corey Webster, R. W. McQuarters, and Curtis Deloatch. Head coach Tom Coughlin named Madison and Corey Webster the starting cornerbacks to begin the season.

On September 10, 2006, Madison started in his team debut during the New York Giants' home-opener against the Indianapolis Colts and set a season-high with seven combined tackles (five solo) as they lost 26–21. This was the first Manning Bowl in NFL history against his long-time rival Peyton Manning. The following week, he recorded six solo tackles and set a season-high with three pass deflections during a 30–24 overtime loss at the Philadelphia Eagles. On October 15, 2006, Madison made two solo tackles, two pass deflections, a fumble recovery, and had his first interception as a member of the Giants on a pass attempt thrown by Michael Vick to wide receiver Roddy White during a 27–14 win at the Atlanta Falcons. The following game, he made two solo tackles, a pass deflection, and intercepted a pass by Drew Bledsoe to wide receiver Terry Glenn during a 36–22 win at the Dallas Cowboys in Week 7. As the Giants led 12–7, Drew Bledsoe threw a pass at the goal line to wide receiver Terry Glenn for the go-ahead touchdown, but had it picked off by Madison. This led to Bledsoe's benching after the game resumed following halftime. The Dallas Cowboys' backup quarterback Tony Romo would replaced him and would ultimately take over as the franchise quarterback. Madison injured his hamstring and would remain inactive for the next two games (Weeks 8–9) only to aggravate the hamstring injury during a 20–38 loss against the Chicago Bears in Week 10, sidelining him for another two games (Weeks 11–12). He finished the season with 39 combined tackles (33 solo), ten pass deflections, two interceptions, and one fumble recovery in 12 games and 12 starts.

==== 2007 ====
On January 11, 2007, the Giants fired defensive coordinator Tim Lewis. The Giants selected Aaron Ross in the first round (20th overall) of the 2007 NFL draft. To begin training camp, Madison was projected to return as a starting cornerback under the Giants' new defensive coordinator Steve Spagnuolo, but had competition for the role from Corey Webster, Aaron Ross, and R. W. McQuarters. He was inactive for the last preseason game due to a strained hamstring. Head coach Tom Coughlin named Madison and Corey Webster the starting cornerbacks to begin the season, but opted to start R. W. McQuarters in his place for the season-opener to avoid a setback.

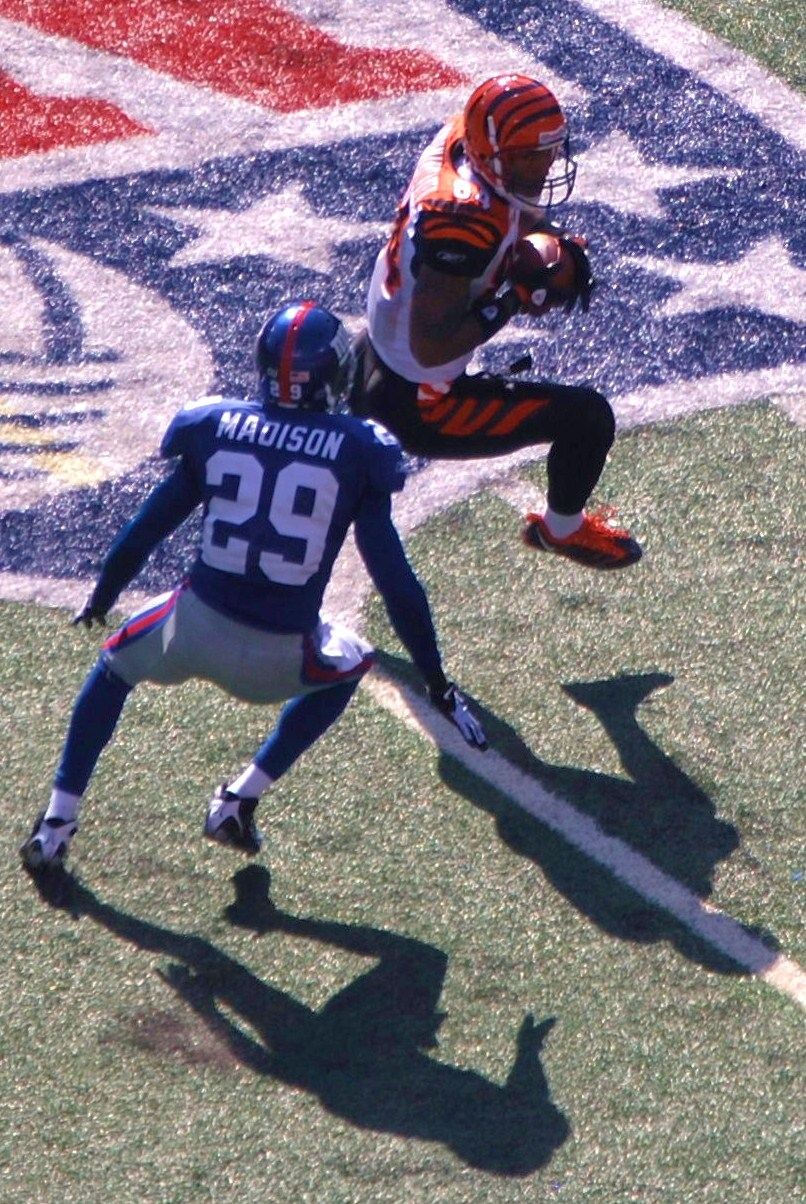
Madison and Cincinnati Bengals #84 T.J. Houshmandzadeh, 21 September 2008

In Week 2, he set a season-high with eight combined tackles (six solo) during a 13–35 loss to the Green Bay Packers. The following week, he set season-highs in solo tackles (7) and pass deflections (3) during a 24–17 win at the Washington Redskins in Week 2. In Week 5, Madison made four solo tackles, two pass deflections, and intercepted a pass by Chad Pennington to wide receiver Jerricho Cotchery as they defeated the New York Jets 24–35. On November 5, 2007, Madison made seven combined tackles (four solo), two pass deflections, and sealed a 16–10 victory at the Detroit Lions by intercepting a pass attempt by Jon Kitna to wide receiver Shaun McDonald with only 56 seconds remaining. On December 23, 2007, Madison made one solo tackle, a pass deflection, and help secure a 38–21 win at the Buffalo Bills by intercepting a pass by Trent Edwards to wide receiver Roscoe Parrish late in the fourth quarter. He finished the season with 68 combined tackles (61 solo), 14 pass deflections, four interceptions, and one sack in 16 games and 15 starts.

The New York Giants finished the 2007 NFL season in second in the NFC East and were able to attain a Wild-Card spot, but were forced to play all of their playoff games as the visiting team on the road. Unfortunately, Madison would be inactive for the first two playoff games after aggravating a strained muscle on his abdomen. Madison's injury has become a key part of the Giants' Super Bowl run, as he was replaced by R. W. McQuarters and rookie Aaron Ross. During the NFC Divisional Round, the Giants had a 21–17 lead at the Dallas Cowboys and the Cowboys had engineered a 25–yard drive to be held at the Giants' 23–yard line on 4th and 11 with only 16 seconds remaining. R. W. McQuarters would secure the victory by intercepting Tony Romo's touchdown pass attempt to wide receiver Terry Glenn. On February 3, 2008, Madison appeared in Super Bowl XLII against the undefeated 18–0 New England Patriots. Madison was reduced to a backup, behind starters Corey Webster and rookie Aaron Ross and primary backup R. W. McQuarters. He was limited to two solo tackles and one pass deflection as the Giants won the Super Bowl 17–14 in an iconic matchup.

==== 2008 ====
The Giants selected Terrell Thomas in the second-round (63rd overall) of the 2008 NFL draft. He entered training camp projected to earn the role as the nickel corner or as the third cornerback on the depth chart, but had to compete among teammates R. W. McQuarters, Terrell Thomas, and Kevin Dockery. Head coach Tom Coughlin named Madison a backup and listed him as the fifth cornerback on the depth chart to begin the season, behind Corey Webster, Aaron Ross, R. W. McQuarters, and Kevin Dockery. He was inactive as a healthy scratch for the Giants' home-opener as they won 16–7 against the Washington Redskins.

On September 21, 2008, Madison set a season-high with three combined tackles (two solo) and had a pass deflection that occurred during a key play in overtime after they were tied 23–23 at the end of regulation against the Cincinnati Bengals. During overtime, Madison had a pass break-up while covering wide receiver T.J. Houshmandzadeh on a pass by Carson Palmer on third-and-8 in overtime. His play forced a punt by the Bengals and led to the game-winning 21–yard field goal by John Carney to end it 23–27. In Week 10, Madison made one solo tackle, one pass deflection, and intercepted a pass by Donovan McNabb to wide receiver Desean Jackson during a 36–31 victory at the Philadelphia Eagles. He was inactive for five games (Weeks 12–16) in-a-row as a healthy scratch. In Week 17, Madison appeared in the Giants' season-finale against the Minnesota Vikings and recorded one solo tackle before he was carted off the field in the third quarter of the 19–20 loss after breaking his ankle. On December 30, 2008, the Giants officially placed Madison on injured reserve due to his broken ankle.

"We're talking about too short of a time to recover and come back, so unfortunately he's finished and his season has come to an end, but any time you have a guy who has been such a factor and has such a great attitude, especially with offering advice to the younger guys, it's a great thing to have around."

— Tom Coughlin (Giants' head coach)

On February 9, 2009, the Giants officially released Madison with one year remaining on his four–year contract, in order to save salary cap space before the start of the new league year on March 1, 2009.

Both Corey Webster and Aaron Ross attribute Madison as a reason they were able to have success in 2007 with Webster stating he acted as a counselor, tutor, and big brother while encouraging him even when he was benched.

== NFL statistics ==
Legend
	Led the league
	Won the Super Bowl
**Bold**	Career high

=== Regular season ===
Year	Team	GP	Cmb	Tackles	Ast	Sck	FF	FR	Yards	Int	Yards	Avg	Lng	TD	PD
1997	MIA	14	20	15	5	0.0	2	0	0	1	21	21	21	0	5
1998	MIA	**16**	44	32	12	**1.0**	0	0	0	**8**	114	14	35	0	**20**
1999	MIA	**16**	45	37	8	0.0	1	0	0	7	**164**	23	**42**	0	14
2000	MIA	**16**	37	27	10	0.0	2	**2**	**20**	5	80	16	34	**1**	12
2001	MIA	13	25	18	7	0.0	0	0	0	2	0	0	0	0	13
2002	MIA	**16**	33	23	10	0.0	1	0	0	3	15	5	15	0	9
2003	MIA	**16**	50	47	3	0.0	0	1	0	3	82	**27**	36	**1**	9
2004	MIA	**16**	44	31	**13**	0.0	**3**	0	4	0	0	0	0	0	7
2005	MIA	15	55	45	10	0.0	1	0	0	2	11	6	11	0	11
2006	NYG	12	39	33	6	0.0	0	1	0	2	28	14	24	0	10
2007	NYG	**16**	**67**	**59**	8	**1.0**	1	1	6	4	59	15	27	0	14
2008	NYG	7	8	7	1	0.0	0	0	0	1	21	21	21	0	2
Career		173	467	374	93	2.0	11	5	0	38	595	16	42	2	126

== Coaching career ==
On February 19, 2019, Madison was hired as the secondary and cornerbacks coach of the Kansas City Chiefs. In his first year as coach, Madison won Super Bowl LIV against the San Francisco 49ers. The Super Bowl win was his second win and first as a coach.

On February 18, 2022, the Miami Dolphins announced they hired Madison as their cornerbacks coach and pass game coordinator.

== Personal life ==
Madison and his wife, Saskia, have two sons, Kellen and Kaden, and a daughter Kennedy. He donated a kidney to his daughter, who was three days shy of her 11th birthday, when both of hers were failing in 2016. His house was featured on an episode of MTV Cribs. In 2019, Madison worked for WTVX as a Miami Dolphins analyst.

On September 13, 1998, as Madison and his father, Sam Madison Sr., were departing Pro Player Stadium after the Dolphins had just defeated the Buffalo Bills, they witnessed Miami Metro-Dade officer, Rueben Jones, getting hit by a car. Madison immediately ran to alert others while his father administered CPR, ultimately helping save his life. On June 5, 1998, Sam Madison Sr. became the first person to receive the Florida Supreme Court's chief justice commendation for heroism and was awarded it by Chief Justice Major B. Harding in Tallahassee. Sam Madison Sr. is a retired Monticello police officer and was also a security officer at the Supreme Court at the time of the incident for six years.
