= Terrell Buckley =

American football player and coach (born 1971)

Mississippi Valley State Delta Devils
- Title: Head coach

Personal information
- Born: June 7, 1971 (age 55); Pascagoula, Mississippi, U.S.
- Listed height: 5 ft 10 in (1.78 m)
- Listed weight: 180 lb (82 kg)

Career information
- High school: Pascagoula
- College: Florida State (1989–1991)
- NFL draft: 1992: 1st round, 5th overall pick

Career history

Playing
- Green Bay Packers (1992–1994); Miami Dolphins (1995–1999); Denver Broncos (2000); New England Patriots (2001); Tampa Bay Buccaneers (2002)*; New England Patriots (2002); Miami Dolphins (2003); New England Patriots (2004)*; New York Jets (2004); New York Giants (2005)
- * Offseason or practice squad member only

Coaching
- Florida State (2007) Assistant safeties coach; Florida State (2008) Assistant wide receivers coach; Florida State (2009) Graduate assistant; Florida State (2010–2011) Weight room coach; Akron (2012–2013) Cornerbacks coach; Louisville (2014–2015) Cornerbacks coach; Mississippi State (2016–2019) Cornerbacks coach; Ole Miss (2020–2021) Cornerbacks coach; Orlando Guardians (2023) Head coach; Mississippi Valley State (2025–present) Head coach

Awards and highlights
- As a player: Super Bowl champion (XXXVI); Jim Thorpe Award (1991); Jack Tatum Trophy (1991); Unanimous All-American (1991); Second-team All-American (1990); Florida State Seminoles Jersey No. 27 honored

Career NFL statistics
- Tackles: 546
- Interceptions: 50
- Interception yards: 793
- Pass deflections: 64
- Forced fumbles: 10
- Fumble recoveries: 15
- Sacks: 2
- Total touchdowns: 8
- Stats at Pro Football Reference

Head coaching record
- Career: 2–10 (.167) (professional); 1–10 (.091) (college)
- College Football Hall of Fame

Douglas Terrell Buckley (born June 7, 1971) is an American college football coach and former cornerback who is the head coach of the Mississippi Valley State Delta Devils. He previously served as the head coach of the Orlando Guardians in 2023. Buckley played college football for the Florida State Seminoles from 1989 to 1991 and in the National Football League (NFL) for 14 seasons from 1992 to 2005, with his longest tenure (1995–1999) as a player with the Miami Dolphins. He was selected by the Green Bay Packers in the first round of the 1992 NFL draft. His New England Patriots won Super Bowl XXXVI, giving him his only championship.

Buckley was born in Pascagoula, Mississippi. After graduation from high school in 1989, Buckley enrolled at Florida State University and played cornerback for the Seminoles, starting for three seasons. As a junior in 1991, he led Florida State to the 1992 Cotton Bowl Classic and was a unanimous All-American.

He also played professional baseball for the Mobile Baysharks in the Texas–Louisiana League.

== College career ==
Buckley was a two-year starter and three-year letterman at Florida State (1989–91), and left as the school's all-time leader in interceptions (21) and interception return yards (501). His career interception yardage total of 501 is an NCAA record. Buckley also tied school records for touchdowns off interception returns (four) and punt returns (three). He was named first-team All-American and won the Jim Thorpe Award, given annually to nation's top cornerback, as a junior. Buckley led the nation with 12 interceptions for 238 yards and two touchdowns. He was named second-team All-American by Associated Press, The Sporting News and The Football News as a junior. Buckley had six interceptions, with two returned for touchdowns. He finished seventh in the Heisman voting in 1991. Buckley played two years of varsity baseball and was a sprinter on the outdoor track team for one year. He was drafted by the Green Bay Packers in the first round of the 1992 NFL draft with the fifth overall pick.

== Professional career ==
Pre-draft measurables
Height	Weight	Arm length	Hand span
5 ft 9 1/8 in (1.76 m)	174 lb (79 kg)	29 3/4 in (0.76 m)	8 in (0.20 m)
All values from the NFL Combine

=== Green Bay Packers ===
The Green Bay Packers selected Buckley in the first round (5th overall) of the 1992 NFL draft. He surpassed 1972 first-round pick (7th overall) Willie Buchanon as the highest drafted cornerback by the Packers in franchise history and still holds the record.

==== 1992 ====
On September 11, 1992, the Green Bay Packers signed Buckley to a four—year, $7.10 million rookie contract that included a signing bonus of $3.20 million. This ended a 50-day holdout by Buckley as he was the last first-round pick to sign.

Due to the holdout, he was exempt for the first two games. Head coach Mike Holmgren named him a backup and listed him as the third cornerback on the depth chart upon joining the team, behind starters Lewis Billups and Vinnie Clark. On September 20, 1992, Buckley made his professional regular season debut and led a fourth quarter comeback victory after he returned a punt by Paul McJulien for a 58–yard touchdown to decrease the 14-point lead by the Bengals, bringing the score to 17–10 at the start of the fourth quarter. The Green Bay Packers would have a 21-point fourth quarter comeback to defeat the Cincinnati Bengals 23–24, capped off by a 35–yard touchdown pass by Brett Favre. His 58–yard punt return for a touchdown set the record for the youngest player to return a punt for a touchdown in NFL history (21 years, 105 days). Buckley still holds the record currently and this would be the only punt returned for a touchdown during his entire career.

Entering Week 5, Buckley supplanted Lewis Billups and took over as a starting cornerback. On October 5, 1992, Packers' head coach Mike Holmgren announced the immediate release of Lewis Billups after he was involved in multiple incidents in the hours after he was benched for Buckley. After losing his starting role, Lewis Billups publicly complained about his benching in favor of Terrell Buckley and had a public outburst on the team's return flight to Green Bay that made a flight attendant cry. At 2AM, it was reported that Lewis Billups had lost control of his Jeep Cherokee and crashed into power lines causing power outages on the Westside of Green Bay. On December 6, 1992, Buckley had his first career interception off a pass by Andre Ware as the Packers routed the Detroit Lions 10–38. On December 20, 1992, Buckley set a season-high with two interceptions and returned one interception thrown by Jim Everett 33–yards to score the first touchdown of his career during a 13–28 victory against the Los Angeles Rams. He finished his rookie season with 32 combined tackles, three interceptions, and one touchdown in 14 games and 12 starts. He was also given punt return duties, finishing with 21 punt returns for 211 return yards and one touchdown.

==== 1993 ====
He returned as the No. 1 starting cornerback to begin 1993, under defensive coordinator Ray Rhodes. He was paired with Roland Mitchell after he started eight games alongside Buckley the previous season. On December 12, 1993, Buckley had his best overall performance of the season by setting season-highs with nine solo tackles and three pass deflections and also sealed a 13–20 victory against the San Diego Chargers by intercepting a pass by Stan Humphries to wide receiver Nate Lewis just prior to the two-minute warning at the end of the fourth quarter. He started all 16 games for the first time in his career and recorded 48 combined tackles (47 solo), made 18 pass deflections, and had two interceptions.

The Green Bay Packers finished the 1993 NFL season in third in the NFC Central with a 9–7 record. On January 8, 1994, Buckley started in his first career playoff game and made four solo tackles, one pass deflection, and intercepted a pass by Erik Kramer in the endzone during the first quarter of a 28–24 victory at the Detroit Lions in the NFC Wild-Card Game. On January 16, 1994, Buckley made two combined tackles (one solo), one pass deflection, and intercepted a pass by Troy Aikman in the beginning of the third quarter during a 17–27 loss at the Dallas Cowboys in the Divisional Round. The Dallas Cowboys would go on to defeat the Buffalo Bills 13–30 to win Super Bowl XXVIII.

==== 1994 ====
The Green Bay Packers would hire Fritz Shurmur as their new defensive coordinator after Ray Rhodes accepted the defensive coordinator position with the 1994 San Francisco 49ers. He retained his role as the No. 1 starting cornerback to begin the season along with Roland Mitchell. On September 4, 1994, Buckley started in the Packers' season-opener at the Minnesota Vikings during a 16–10 victory. During the game, Roland Mitchell suffered a herniated disc in his neck and remained inactive for the remainder of the season and would retire at the start on 1995. Head coach Mike Holmgren promoted Doug Evans to the No. 2 starting cornerback.

On September 18, 1994, Buckley made one solo tackle, set a season-high with four pass deflections, and intercepted a pass by Randall Cunningham to wide receiver Victor Bailey during a 7–13 loss at the Philadelphia Eagles. In Week 5, he set a season-high with eight combined tackles (six solo) and made one pass deflection during a 16–17 loss at the New England Patriots. On November 13, 1994, Buckley made six combined tackles (four solo), a pass deflection, and helped secure a 10–17 win against the New York Jets by intercepting a pass by Boomer Esiason to wide receiver Ryan Yarborough in the fourth quarter. The following week, he tied his season-high of six solo tackles, made two pass deflections, and intercepted a pass by Jim Kelly during a 20–29 loss at the Buffalo Bills in Week 12. In Week 13, Buckley made four solo tackles, three pass deflections, and had his third consecutive game with an interception on a pass by Jason Garrett to wide receiver Michael Irvin during a 31–42 loss at the Dallas Cowboys. He started all 16 games throughout the 1994 NFL season and recorded 56 combined tackles (45 solo), made 17 pass deflections, five interceptions, and had one fumble recovery.

=== Miami Dolphins ===
==== 1995 ====
On April 3, 1995, the Green Bay Packers traded Buckley to the Miami Dolphins for "past considerations". Immediately after the trade was made official, the Miami Dolphins signed Buckley to a two-year contract extension, restructuring his remaining year on his rookie contract to a three-year contract that will keep him throughout the 1997 NFL season.

He entered training camp slated as the primary nickelback. Head coach Don Shula named Buckley a backup and listed him as the third cornerback on the depth chart to begin the season, behind returning starting duo Troy Vincent and J. B. Brown. He started alongside Troy Vincent for the last four games of the season (Weeks 14–17) in place of J. B. Brown, who was inactive due to a knee injury. On December 24, 1995, Buckley set a season-high with seven solo tackles, two pass deflections, and had his lone interception of the season on a pass attempt by Mark Rypien during a 41–22 victory at the St. Louis Rams. He finished with 26 combined tackles (23 solo), seven pass deflections, and one interception in 16 games and four starts.

==== 1996 ====
On January 11, 1996, the Miami Dolphins hired Jimmy Johnson to be their new head coach after the retirement of Don Shula. Troy Vincent departed in free agency to sign with the Philadelphia Eagles. Throughout training camp, Buckley competed for the role as the No. 1 starting cornerback against J. B. Brown and Calvin Jackson under new defensive coordinator George Hill. He was named the No. 1 starting cornerback to begin the season and was paired with Calvin Jackson.

On September 1, 1996, Buckley started in the Dolphins' home-opener against the New England Patriots and recorded one solo tackle, set a season-high with two pass deflections, and intercepted a pass by Drew Bledsoe to wide receiver Troy Brown as they won 10–24. The following week, he made four solo tackles, two pass deflections, and set a season-high with two interceptions off passes by Boomer Esiason and Kent Graham during a 38–10 victory at the Arizona Cardinals in Week 2. In Week 3, he had three solo tackles, one pass deflection, and intercepted a pass by Neil O'Donnell as the Dolphins defeated the New York Jets 36–27. On October 13, 1996, Buckley set a season-high with six combined tackles (five solo), made two pass deflections, and had a pick-six, returning an interception on a pass by Jim Kelly to wide receiver Andre Reed for 91–yards to score a touchdown during a 21–7 win at the Buffalo Bills. In Week 10, he made four solo tackles, a pass deflection, and had his sixth interception of the season on a pass by Drew Bledsoe to wide receiver Terry Glenn during a 23–42 loss at the New England Patriots. He started all 16 games in 1996 and finished with a total of 52 combined tackles (45 solo), 17 pass deflections, six interceptions, and scored one touchdown. His 164–yards on interception returns led the league in 1996.

==== 1997 ====
The Dolphins selected Sam Madison in the second round (44th overall) of the 1997 NFL draft. On July 1, 1997, the Miami Dolphins signed Buckley to a two-year contract extension.

Although they drafted Sam Madison, head coach Jimmy Johnson elected to retain Buckley and Calvin Jackson as the starting cornerbacks to begin the season. On October 27, 1997, Buckley made one solo tackle and recovered a fumble by wide receiver Ricky Proehl and returned it 22–yards for a touchdown during a 33–36 overtime loss to the Chicago Bears. In Week 11, he set a season-high with 11 combined tackles (seven solo) as the Dolphins lost 24–17 against the New York Jets. On December 7, 1997, Buckley made five combined tackles (four solo), two pass deflections, and set a season-high with two interceptions off passes by Scott Mitchell during a 33–30 victory against the Detroit Lions. He started all 16 games for the second consecutive season and set a career-high with 85 combined tackles (67 solo), ten pass deflections, four interceptions, two fumble recoveries, one forced fumble, and scored two touchdowns.

==== 1998 ====
The Miami Dolphins would select Patrick Surtain in the second round (44th overall) of the 1998 NFL draft. Throughout training camp, Buckley competed to retain his role as the No. 1 starting cornerback against Sam Madison (4× Pro Bowl) and Patrick Surtain (3× Pro Bowl). Head coach Jimmy Johnson selected Buckley and Sam Madison as the starting cornerbacks to begin the season with rookie Patrick Surtain as the third option.

On September 6, 1998, Buckley started in the Dolphins' season-opener at the Indianapolis Colts and made three solo tackles, set a season-high with four pass deflections, made two interceptions, and returned one for a 21–yard touchdown during a 24–15 victory. During the second quarter, Buckley intercepted a pass thrown by rookie quarterback Peyton Manning to wide receiver Marvin Harrison and returned it 12–yards, marking the first interception of Manning's career after 22 minutes and 1 second. In Week 6, he recorded two solo tackles, made one pass deflection, and intercepted a pass attempt by Mark Brunell to wide receiver Keenan McCardell during a 21–28 loss at the Jacksonville Jaguars. On November 29, 1998, he had three solo tackles, one pass deflection, and intercepted a pass by Kerry Collins to tight end Cam Cleeland as the Dolphins defeated the New Orleans Saints 10–30. The following week, he made three solo tackles, three pass deflections, and intercepted a pass by Donald Hollas to wide receiver James Jett during a 27–17 win at the Oakland Raiders in Week 14. On December 13, 1998, Buckley made three combined tackles (two solo), had one pass break-up, and had his third consecutive game with an interception, picking off Vinny Testaverde on a pass to wide receiver Keyshawn Johnson during a 21–16 loss against the New York Jets. This marked his eighth interception of the season setting a career-high. His eight interceptions finished second in the league in 1998, behind Ty Law with nine interceptions. He started all 16 games and finished with a total of 52 combined tackles (44 solo) and one touchdown. He set career-highs in interceptions (8) and pass deflections (20).

=== Denver Broncos ===
On July 21, 2000, the Denver Broncos signed Buckley to a one-year contract.

=== New England Patriots ===
On July 8, 2001, the New England Patriots signed Buckley to a one-year contract. Buckley is one of only two players (the other being Ken Riley) with 50+ interceptions to never make a Pro Bowl. He responded to criticism of his tackling by giving himself the nickname “the Vaccinator.” The nickname would stay with him over the years if only in an ironic sense.

He had at least one interception in 13 consecutive seasons. While playing for the New England Patriots, in the 2001 AFC Championship Game against the Pittsburgh Steelers, Buckley had an interception in the 24–17 win. He won a Super Bowl ring two weeks later in the win over the St. Louis Rams.

== NFL career statistics ==
=== Regular season ===
Year	Team	Games		Tackles				Interceptions					Fumbles			
Year	Team	GP	GS	Comb	Solo	Ast	Sck	Int	Yds	Avg	Lng	TD	FF	FR	Yds	TD
1992	GB	14	12	32	—	—	0.0	3	33	11.0	33	1	0	4	0	0
1993	GB	16	16	48	—	—	0.0	2	31	15.5	31	0	0	0	0	0
1994	GB	16	16	59	48	11	0.0	5	38	7.6	26	0	3	1	0	0
1995	MIA	16	4	26	23	3	0.0	1	0	0.0	0	0	0	0	0	0
1996	MIA	16	16	53	46	7	0.0	6	164	27.3	91	1	2	2	0	0
1997	MIA	16	16	85	67	18	0.0	4	26	6.5	12	0	1	2	23	1
1998	MIA	16	16	51	44	7	0.0	8	157	19.6	61	1	2	2	0	0
1999	MIA	16	11	44	38	6	1.0	3	3	1.0	18	0	0	0	0	0
2000	DEN	16	16	38	35	3	0.0	6	110	18.3	33	1	0	0	0	0
2001	NE	15	1	27	25	2	1.0	3	76	25.3	52	1	0	0	0	0
2002	NE	16	2	22	22	0	0.0	4	50	12.5	39	0	0	0	0	0
2003	MIA	16	5	51	40	11	0.0	2	75	37.5	74	1	1	4	8	0
2004	NYJ	16	0	10	8	2	0.0	3	30	10.0	18	0	1	0	0	0
2005	NYG	4	0	Did not record any stats												
Career		209	131	546	396	70	2.0	50	793	15.9	91	6	10	15	31	1

== Coaching career ==
=== Florida State ===
Buckley got his coaching start after earning his undergraduate degree from Florida State in 2007. From 2008 to 2011, he served in various assistant roles on Bobby Bowden and Jimbo Fisher’s staffs.

=== Akron ===
Finally getting his first on-the-field coaching position, Buckley was hired by his collegiate head coach's son, Terry Bowden, at the University of Akron in January 2012 to coach cornerbacks. This reunited him with Coach Chuck Amato and with Coach Todd Stroud—who he played for, and coached with at FSU.

=== Louisville ===
After two seasons at Akron, he was hired as the cornerbacks coach at the University of Louisville in January 2014.

=== Mississippi State ===
On January 7, 2016, Buckley was hired as the safeties coach at Mississippi State University.

=== Ole Miss ===
On January 18, 2020, Buckley was hired as cornerbacks coach at Ole Miss by Lane Kiffin, the new head coach. Buckley was hired for his success in both recruiting and developing elite talent both on and off the field, and for grooming NFL talent.

=== XFL ===
On April 6, 2022, it was reported that Buckley had accepted a job with the XFL to become the head coach of an upcoming Orlando franchise (the former Tampa Bay Vipers). The league confirmed Buckley's hiring, but not the existence of a team in Orlando, on April 14. On July 25, 2022, the XFL confirmed a franchise in Orlando, Florida with Buckley announced as head coach. On October 31, 2022, the team was branded the Orlando Guardians. On January 1, 2024, it was announced the Guardians would not be a part of the UFL merger.

=== Mississippi Valley State ===
Buckley was hired as the head football coach at Mississippi Valley State University, a historically black college, on January 21, 2025.

== Head coaching record ==
=== XFL ===
Team	Year	Regular season				Postseason			
Team	Year	Won	Lost	Win %	Finish	Won	Lost	Win %	Result
ORL	2023	1	9	.100	4th XFL South	—	—	—	—
Total		1	9	.100		—	—	—	

=== College ===
Year	Team	Overall	Conference	Standing	Bowl/playoffs
Mississippi Valley State Delta Devils (Southwestern Athletic Conference) (2025–present)
2025	Mississippi Valley State	1–10	0–7	(East)	
Mississippi Valley State:		1–10	0–7		
Total:		1–10			

== Personal life ==
Buckley has three daughters, Sherrell, Brianna, and Britney. He is the son of Eddie Buckley Sr. of Columbia, MS and Laura Buckley of Pascagoula, MS. He is a distant cousin of the late Chicago Bears running back Walter Payton.

Buckley majored in theater with a minor in political science in college, and played baseball in the Atlanta Braves organization prior to reporting to Green Bay's training camp in July 1994. His hobbies include baseball, basketball and golf. Buckley has participated in events benefiting the Make-A-Wish Foundation and the Cystic Fibrosis Foundation. He has worked on behalf of the national Feed the Children campaign. He assisted in building a house in Little Haiti for Habitat for Humanity during the 1999 offseason.

Sports Talk radio host Jim Rome refers to Buckley as "T-Buck" and credits him as one of The Jungle's first guests who appeared consistently on the program. Rome, inaccurately, credits Buckley as the inventor of the Lambeau Leap, based on an interview that Buckley gave.
