= George Teague =

American football player (born 1971)

No. 31, 30, 23
- Position: Safety

Personal information
- Born: February 18, 1971 (age 55); Lansing, Michigan, U.S.
- Listed height: 6 ft 1 in (1.85 m)
- Listed weight: 204 lb (93 kg)

Career information
- High school: Jefferson Davis (Montgomery, Alabama)
- College: Alabama
- NFL draft: 1993: 1st round, 29th overall pick

Career history
- Green Bay Packers (1993–1995); Atlanta Falcons (1996)*; Dallas Cowboys (1996); Miami Dolphins (1997); Dallas Cowboys (1998–2001)
- * Offseason or practice squad member only

Awards and highlights
- PFWA All-Rookie Team (1993); National champion (1992); Second-team All-American (1992); First-team All-SEC (1992); Second-team All-SEC (1991)

Career NFL statistics
- Tackles: 463
- Sacks: 2
- Forced fumbles: 6
- Fumble recoveries: 4
- Interceptions: 15
- Defensive touchdowns: 2
- Stats at Pro Football Reference

George Theo Teague (born February 18, 1971) is an American former professional football player who was a safety in the National Football League (NFL) who played for the Green Bay Packers, Dallas Cowboys and Miami Dolphins. He played college football at the University of Alabama.

== Early life ==
An Air Force brat, Teague grew up at McConnell Air Force Base, Kansas attending Derby High School in Derby, Kansas and Sembach Air Base, before moving to Alabama and attending Jefferson Davis High School. As a senior cornerback, he was named first-team class 6A All-state and Academic All-state. He also practiced track.

Teague accepted a football scholarship from the University of Alabama. He was a reserve cornerback as a true freshman. Teague was named a starter at cornerback as a sophomore, tallying one interception.

As a junior, Teague was moved to free safety, where he led the conference with six interceptions and recorded career-highs for tackles (54) and passes defensed (11).

As a senior, Teague tied for the conference lead with six interceptions. His 14 career interceptions were two short of the school record at the time. Teague came to be known nationally as a playmaker in the 1993 Sugar Bowl. This game marked his first interception returned for a touchdown in his college career. Five plays later, he raced downfield and caught up with sprinting wide receiver Lamar Thomas and stripped the ball from him in full stride, while maintaining possession and returning the ball upfield. Although the play was called back on an offside penalty against Alabama, it was still successful in preventing a Hurricane touchdown, as Miami would have simply declined the penalty had the strip not taken place. It also negated Miami's effort to regain their offensive momentum: Miami was forced to punt soon afterward, and never mounted another substantial offensive threat in the Crimson Tide's 34–13 victory.

== Professional career ==
Pre-draft measurables
Height	Weight	Arm length	Hand span	Vertical jump	Broad jump	Bench press
6 ft 0 1/4 in (1.84 m)	185 lb (84 kg)	31 5/8 in (0.80 m)	8 1/4 in (0.21 m)	30.5 in (0.77 m)	9 ft 7 in (2.92 m)	11 reps
All values from NFL Combine

=== Green Bay Packers ===
Teague was selected by the Green Bay Packers in the first round (29th overall) of the 1993 NFL draft. He started the last 12 games at free safety, making 36 tackles, six passes defensed, one forced fumble, one interception, two fumble recoveries and five special teams tackles. In the playoffs against the Detroit Lions, he recorded the longest interception return for a touchdown in post-season history (101 yards), and along with his four tackles, earned him the NFL's Defensive Player of the Week award.

In 1994, Teague practiced on a limited basis early in training camp due to a thyroid condition, which caused a pronounced weight loss initially and later affected his conditioning. He began practicing on a full-time basis on August 4. Teague started 16 games, collecting 53 tackles, three interceptions (tied for second on the team), 13 passes defensed (third on the team) and one forced fumble.

In 1995, Teague started 15 games, making 72 tackles (tied for sixth on the team), two interceptions, 13 passes defensed and one fumble recovery. He missed one game with a broken toe.

=== Atlanta Falcons ===
On August 17, 1996, the Atlanta Falcons waived Teague after only a month.

=== Dallas Cowboys (first stint) ===
On August 23, 1996, Teague was signed as a free agent by the Dallas Cowboys. He played as a nickel defensive back, before starting eight games after Brock Marion suffered a fractured scapula. He finished the year with 70 tackles, seven passes defensed, six special teams tackles and a career-high four interceptions.

His career signature game came against the Minnesota Vikings in the NFC wild-card playoff game, where he was dominant in helping the Cowboys produce a 40–15 rout. He forced turnovers on three consecutive Vikings possessions. He first denied Amp Lee of a 43-yard touchdown reception, by stripping the ball which went out of the end zone for a touchback. On the next Vikings possession, he caused a Leroy Hoard fumble. He then proceeded to return an interception 29 yards for a touchdown. He received NFL Defensive Player of the Week honors.

The Cowboys were unable to re-sign him at the end of the season, because of the salary cap problems they had at the time.

=== Miami Dolphins ===
On March 19, 1997, Teague was signed away by the Miami Dolphins as a free agent after jump-starting his career with the Cowboys. He began the season as a backup to Corey Harris. Teague was named the starter at free safety in the seventh game and remained there until the twelfth contest, after Calvin Jackson was moved from cornerback to safety to make room for rookie Sam Madison. He started six games, tallying 43 tackles, three passes defensed, two forced fumbles and three special teams tackles. On March 10, 1998, the Dolphins waived him to make room for safety Brock Marion.

=== Dallas Cowboys (second stint) ===
On May 6, 1998, Teague was signed by the Dallas Cowboys as a free agent, to replace Brock Marion, who in turn had signed with the Dolphins to replace Teague. He played as a nickel defensive back, before passing Omar Stoutmire on the depth chart and being named the starter at free safety in the tenth game, against the Arizona Cardinals. He registered 52 tackles (tenth on the team), two sacks, six passes defensed and nine special teams tackles.

In 1999, Teague started 14 games at free safety, making 102 tackles (fourth on the team), two tackles for loss, nine passes defensed, one forced fumble, one fumble recovery, eight special teams tackles and three interceptions, including two returned for touchdowns. He missed two games with a strained neck injury.

In 2000, Teague started nine games, missing the final seven contests with a fractured right foot. He recorded 71 tackles and was on a pace to register a career-high 127 stops before he suffered his injury. Teague also had five special teams tackles. Teague is best remembered for a notable incident during a game against the San Francisco 49ers on September 24. In that game, 49ers wide receiver Terrell Owens caught his second touchdown pass of the game and ran to the Cowboys' star logo at midfield to celebrate, as he had on his previous touchdown. Teague violently shoved Owens from behind during the celebration and was ejected from the game. In 2008, the moment was named one of the ten most memorable in the history of Texas Stadium by ESPN.

In 2001, Teague started 16 games. On September 23, just two weeks after the September 11 attacks, as the Cowboys were taking the field to play the San Diego Chargers at Texas Stadium, Teague carried the American flag, displayed above his head. He was released from the Cowboys on February 28, 2002.

=== NFL statistics ===
Year	Team	Games	Combined tackles	Tackles	Assisted tackles	Sacks	Forced fumbles	Fumble recoveries	Fumble return yards	Interceptions	Interception return yards	Yards per interception return	Longest interception return	Interceptions returned for touchdown	Passes defended
1993	GB	16	35	31	4	0.0	0	2	0	1	22	22	22	0	7
1994	GB	16	52	40	12	0.0	0	0	0	3	33	11	16	0	13
1995	GB	15	56	42	14	0.0	0	1	0	2	100	50	74	0	12
1996	DAL	16	57	47	10	0.0	0	0	0	4	47	12	22	0	6
1997	MIA	15	38	19	19	0.0	1	0	0	2	25	13	23	0	3
1998	DAL	16	42	34	8	2.0	1	0	0	0	0	0	0	0	6
1999	DAL	14	67	48	19	0.0	1	1	0	3	127	42	95	2	9
2000	DAL	9	42	37	5	0.0	1	0	0	0	0	0	0	0	1
2001	DAL	16	58	43	15	0.0	1	0	0	0	0	0	0	0	6
Career		133	447	341	106	2.0	5	4	0	15	354	24	95	2	63

== Coaching career ==
On December 9, 2016, Teague accepted a position as the head football coach at John Paul II High School in Plano, Texas. He previously served as the athletic director and football coach for June Shelton School, Harvest Christian Academy and Carrollton Christian Academy.
