= George Hill (American football) =

American football coach (1933–2020)

Biographical details
- Born: April 28, 1933; Bay Village, Ohio, U.S.
- Died: November 10, 2020 (aged 87); Florida, U.S.

Playing career
- 1952–1957: Denison

Coaching career (HC unless noted)
- 1960–1964: Denison (DC)
- 1965: Cornell (DC)
- 1966–1970: Duke (DC)
- 1971–1978: Ohio State (DC)
- 1979–1984: Philadelphia Eagles (LB)
- 1985–1988: Indianapolis Colts (DC)
- 1989–1995: Miami Dolphins (LB)
- 1996–1999: Miami Dolphins (DC/LB)

George Hill (April 28, 1933 – November 10, 2020) was an American football coach who worked as an assistant in college football and in the National Football League. He was the defensive coordinator of the Miami Dolphins from 1996 to 1999. Prior to that, he served as the team's linebacker coach under Don Shula. Hill was defensive coordinator for the Indianapolis Colts from 1985 to 1988 under Rod Dowhower and Ron Meyer

== Miami Dolphins ==
As the defensive coordinator for the Miami Dolphins, Hill developed the talents of players such as linebacker Zach Thomas, cornerback Sam Madison, defensive end Jason Taylor, and cornerback Terrell Buckley. In 1996, his defense ranked seventh in rushing yards allowed. The next season, 1997, they finished fourth in rushing touchdowns allowed. In 1998, his defense has its best season as they finished first in points allowed. Madison and Buckley each finished with eight interceptions. Trace Armstrong finished with 10.5 sacks and Taylor finished with nine sacks. Lorenzo Bromell totaled eight sacks. In 1999, the Dolphins finished fifth in passing yards allowed and eight in rushing yards allowed.
