= Sherriden May =

American football player (born 1973)

No. 32
- Position: Running back

Personal information
- Born: August 10, 1973 (age 53); Tacoma, Washington, U.S.
- Listed height: 6 ft 0 in (1.83 m)
- Listed weight: 215 lb (98 kg)

Career information
- High school: Spanaway Lake (Spanaway, Washington)
- College: Idaho
- NFL draft: 1995: undrafted

Career history
- New York Jets (1995–1996)

Career NFL statistics
- Rushing yards: 5
- Rushing average: 2.5
- Stats at Pro Football Reference

Sherriden May (born August 10, 1973) is an American former professional football player who was a running back for the New York Jets of the National Football League (NFL) from 1995 to 1996. He played college football for the Idaho Vandals.
