= Curtis Ceaser =

American football player (born 1972)

No. 88
- Position: Wide receiver

Personal information
- Born: August 11, 1972 (age 54); Lincoln, Nebraska, U.S.
- Listed height: 6 ft 2 in (1.88 m)
- Listed weight: 190 lb (86 kg)

Career information
- High school: Beaumont (TX) West Brook
- College: Grambling State
- NFL draft: 1995: 7th round, 217th overall pick

Career history
- New York Jets (1995); Florida Bobcats (1998–2001); Grand Rapids Rampage (2002)

Awards and highlights
- Arena Football League All-Ironman Team (2000); Arena Football League All-Rookie Team (1998)

Career AFL statistics
- Receptions: 321
- Receiving yards: 4,166
- Touchdowns: 88
- Stats at ArenaFan.com
- Stats at Pro Football Reference

Curtis Ceaser (born August 11, 1972) is an American former professional football player who was a wide receiver for the New York Jets of the National Football League (NFL) in 1995. He played college football for the Grambling State Tigers and was selected by the Jets in the seventh round of the 1995 NFL draft with the 217th overall pick.
