= Joe Planansky =

American football player (born 1971)

No. 88
- Position: Tight end

Personal information
- Born: October 21, 1971 (age 55); Hemingford, Nebraska, U.S.
- Listed height: 6 ft 4 in (1.93 m)
- Listed weight: 254 lb (115 kg)

Career information
- High school: Hemingford
- College: Chadron State
- NFL draft: 1995: undrafted

Career history
- Miami Dolphins (1995)
- Stats at Pro Football Reference

Josef M. Planansky (born October 21, 1971) is an American former professional football player who was a tight end for the Miami Dolphins of the National Football League (NFL). He played college football for the Chadron State Eagles.
