= Ed Hawthorne =

American football player (born 1970)

No. 74
- Position: Nose tackle

Personal information
- Born: July 30, 1970 (age 56); St. Louis, Missouri, U.S.
- Listed height: 6 ft 1 in (1.85 m)
- Listed weight: 305 lb (138 kg)

Career information
- High school: Parkway West (Chesterfield, Missouri)
- College: Minnesota
- NFL draft: 1995: undrafted

Career history
- Miami Dolphins (1995)

Career NFL statistics
- Games played: 1
- Stats at Pro Football Reference

Edward William Hawthorne (born July 30, 1970) is an American former professional football player who was a defensive back for the Miami Dolphins of the National Football League (NFL). He played college football for the Minnesota Golden Gophers.
