= Chris Gray (American football) =

American football player (born 1970)

No. 62
- Positions: Guard, center

Personal information
- Born: June 19, 1970 (age 56); Birmingham, Alabama, U.S.
- Listed height: 6 ft 4 in (1.93 m)
- Listed weight: 308 lb (140 kg)

Career information
- High school: Homewood (Homewood, Alabama)
- College: Auburn
- NFL draft: 1993: 5th round, 132nd overall pick

Career history
- Miami Dolphins (1993–1996); Chicago Bears (1997); Seattle Seahawks (1998–2007)

Awards and highlights
- Seattle Seahawks Top 50 players; Second-team All-SEC (1992)

Career NFL statistics
- Games played: 208
- Games started: 170
- Fumble recoveries: 5
- Stats at Pro Football Reference

Christopher William Gray (born June 19, 1970) is an American former professional football player who was a guard in the National Football League (NFL). He played college football for the Auburn Tigers and was selected 132nd overall by the Miami Dolphins in the fifth round of the 1993 NFL draft.

Gray played four seasons with the Dolphins until 1996, one season for the Chicago Bears in 1997 and finally over a decade with the Seattle Seahawks. He retired from the Seahawks prior to the 2008 season because he was "at risk for paralysis because of a lower back and spine injury...."

Chris Gray holds the Seahawks franchise record for consecutive starts with 121 and is 9th for total games with 145.

Although he never made it into the Pro Bowl, he was an integral part of the offensive line that blocked for Matt Hasselbeck and Shaun Alexander during their five consecutive playoff appearances (2003–2007), including Alexander's MVP year in 2005. He was also on the 1999 AFC West Champion Seahawks. During his career with the Seahawks, he played every position on their offensive line.

In 2008, Gray was a recipient of the Ed Block Courage Award, and in 2015, he was inducted into the Alabama Sports Hall of Fame.
