= Calvin Jackson (American football) =

American football player (1972–2021)

No. 38
- Positions: Cornerback, safety

Personal information
- Born: October 28, 1972; Miami, Florida, U.S.
- Died: March 15, 2021 (aged 48)
- Listed height: 5 ft 9 in (1.75 m)
- Listed weight: 185 lb (84 kg)

Career information
- High school: Fort Lauderdale (FL) Dillard
- College: Auburn
- NFL draft: 1994: undrafted

Career history
- Miami Dolphins (1994–1999); Birmingham Thunderbolts (2001)

Awards and highlights
- First-team All-SEC (1993)

Career NFL statistics
- Tackles: 250
- Interceptions: 4
- Sacks: 4
- Stats at Pro Football Reference

Calvin Bernard Jackson (October 28, 1972 – March 15, 2021) was an American professional football player who was a defensive back for the Miami Dolphins in the National Football League (NFL). Born in Miami, he was signed by the Dolphins as an undrafted free agent in 1994. He played college football for the Auburn Tigers.

Jackson died on March 15, 2021.

== NFL career statistics ==
Legend
**Bold**	Career high

=== Regular season ===
Year	Team	Games		Tackles				Interceptions				Fumbles			
Year	Team	GP	GS	Comb	Solo	Ast	Sck	Int	Yds	TD	Lng	FF	FR	Yds	TD
1994	MIA	2	0	0	0	0	0.0	0	0	0	0	0	0	0	0
1995	MIA	9	1	12	12	0	0.0	1	23	0	23	0	0	0	0
1996	MIA	16	15	62	52	10	**1.5**	**3**	**82**	**1**	**61**	0	0	0	0
1997	MIA	16	16	**76**	**61**	**15**	0.5	0	0	0	0	0	**1**	0	0
1998	MIA	16	15	43	32	11	1.0	0	0	0	0	0	0	0	0
1999	MIA	16	10	57	46	11	1.0	0	0	0	0	**2**	0	0	0
		75	57	250	203	47	4.0	4	105	1	61	2	1	0	0

=== Playoffs ===
Year	Team	Games		Tackles				Interceptions				Fumbles			
Year	Team	GP	GS	Comb	Solo	Ast	Sck	Int	Yds	TD	Lng	FF	FR	Yds	TD
1995	MIA	1	1	3	3	0	0.0	0	0	0	0	0	0	0	0
1997	MIA	1	1	6	**6**	0	0.0	0	0	0	0	0	**1**	0	0
1998	MIA	2	2	5	5	0	0.0	0	0	0	0	0	0	0	0
1999	MIA	2	0	**7**	5	**2**	0.0	**1**	0	0	0	0	0	0	0
		6	4	21	19	2	0.0	1	0	0	0	0	1	0	0
