= 1982 Miami Dolphins season =

17th season in franchise history; second Super Bowl loss

- Owner: Joe Robbie
- Head coach: Don Shula
- Defensive coordinator: Bill Arnsparger
- Home stadium: Miami Orange Bowl

Results
- Record: 7–2
- Division place: 2nd AFC
- Playoffs: Won Wild Card Playoffs (vs. Patriots) 28–13; Won Divisional Playoffs (vs. Chargers) 34–13; Won AFC Championship (vs. Jets) 14–0; Lost Super Bowl XVII (vs. Redskins) 17–27
- Pro Bowlers: 3 FB Andra Franklin; G Ed Newman; DT Bob Baumhower

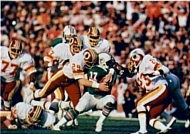
The Dolphins playing against the Redskins in Super Bowl XVII.

The 1982 Miami Dolphins season was the team's seventeenth in the National Football League (NFL). The Dolphins were coming off an unexpected 11–4–1 1981 season and a devastating loss to the San Diego Chargers in the Divisional Round the previous season in a game dubbed the Epic in Miami. The team had clinched the 2 seed and were picked by many to reach the Super Bowl during the 1981 season. Because of the high number of picks to reach the Super Bowl the previous season, many more fans picked them to win it during the 1982 season. The Dolphins looked to improve on their 11 wins from 1981. However, a players strike cancelled 7 of the team's 16 games. Because of this, the NFL schedule was shrunk to 9 games.

== Season summary ==
The Dolphins started out fresh, winning their first 2 games prior to the strike. When season play resumed 2 months later, the Dolphins defeated the Buffalo Bills 9–7 in Buffalo to clinch a 3–0 start. After a loss to Tampa Bay, they defeated the Minnesota Vikings 22–14. The next week, they lost a brisk game against the Patriots 3–0 in a game called the Snowplow Game. The Dolphins would then win 3 straight games to end the season 7–2, tied for second in the AFC with the Cincinnati Bengals. The Dolphins won 2nd place over them by virtue of a series of tiebreakers. In the playoffs, they defeated the Patriots in a rematch by the score of 28–13. They then defeated the Chargers in a rematch of the 1981 Divisional Playoffs by a score of 34–13. In the AFC Championship game, they shutout the Jets, 14–0 to reach the Super Bowl for the first time since 1973. In Super Bowl XVII, they lost to the Redskins 27–17 in a rematch of Super Bowl VII which concluded Miami's perfect 1972 season.

== Off-season ==
=== NFL draft ===
1982 Miami Dolphins draft
Round	Pick	Player	Position	College	Notes
1	24	Roy Foster *	G	USC	
2	52	Mark Duper *	WR	Northwestern State	
3	80	Paul Lankford	CB	Penn State	
4	108	Charles Bowser	LB	Duke	
5	120	Bob Nelson	DT	Miami (FL)	from Minnesota
5	136	Rich Diana	RB	Yale	
6	161	Tom Tutson	DB	South Carolina State	from San Diego
6	164	Ron Hester	LB	Florida State	
7	170	Dan Johnson	TE	Iowa State	from New Orleans
7	192	Larry Cowan	RB	Jackson State	
8	220	Tate Randle	DB	Texas Tech	played for Houston
9	239	Steve Clark	DE	Utah	
9	248	Mack Boatner	RB	Southeastern Louisiana	
10	271	Robin Fisher	LB	Florida	
10	276	Wayne Jones	OT	Utah	
11	303	Gary Crum	OT	Wyoming	
12	331	Mike Rodrigue	WR	Miami (FL)	
Made roster † Pro Football Hall of Fame * Made at least one Pro Bowl during career

== Personnel ==
=== Coaches / Staff ===
1982 Miami Dolphins staff
Front office: Team Owner / President – Joe Robbie; Executive vice president/general manager – Mike Robbie; Vice president – Don Shula; Director of player personnel – Chuck Connor; Director of pro scouting – Charley Winner; Head coaches: Head coach – Don Shula; Offensive coaches: Quarterbacks/receivers – Wally English; Offensive backs – Carl Taseff; Offensive line/running game – John Sandusky	Defensive coaches: Assistant head coach/defense – Bill Arnsparger; Defensive line/run defense – Mike Scarry; Defensive backs – Tom Keane; Special teams coaches: Special teams – Steve Crosby, Carl Taseff; Punting – Tom Keane

=== Roster ===
1982 Miami Dolphins roster
Quarterbacks (QB): 11 Jim Jensen; 10 Don Strock; 16 David Woodley; Running backs (RB): 34 Woody Bennett; 33 Rich Diana; 37 Andra Franklin; 31 Eddie Hill; 22 Tony Nathan; 32 Tommy Vigorito; Wide receivers (WR): 81 Jimmy Cefalo; 85 Mark Duper; 82 Duriel Harris; 88 Vince Heflin; 89 Nat Moore; Tight ends (TE): 84 Bruce Hardy; 86 Ronnie Lee; 80 Joe Rose	Offensive linemen (OL): 63 Mark Dennard C; 61 Roy Foster G/T; 79 Jon Giesler T; 74 Cleveland Green T; 67 Bob Kuechenberg G; 68 Eric Laakso T; 57 Dwight Stephenson C; 60 Jeff Toews G; Defensive linemen (DL): 73 Bob Baumhower NT; 75 Doug Betters DE; 72 Richard Bishop NT; 58 Kim Bokamper DE; 76 Steve Clark DE; 83 Vern Den Herder DE	Linebackers (LB): 56 Charles Bowser OLB; 59 Bob Brudzinski OLB; 77 A.J. Duhe ILB; 50 Larry Gordon OLB; 53 Ron Hester OLB; 54 Steve Potter ILB; 55 Earnie Rhone ILB; 52 Steve Shull ILB; Defensive backs (DB): 47 Glenn Blackwood SS; 42 Lyle Blackwood FS; 49 William Judson FS; 40 Mike Kozlowski SS; 44 Paul Lankford CB; 28 Don McNeal CB; 48 Gerald Small CB; 41 Fulton Walker CB; Special teams (ST): 3 Tom Orosz P; 5 Uwe von Schamann K	Reserve: 70 Bill Barnett DE (IR); 87 Dan Johnson TE (IR); 64 Ed Newman G (IR); 78 Ken Poole DE (IR); 20 Tom Tutson CB (IR); Rookies in italics

== Regular season ==
The Dolphins' main strength was their defense, nicknamed the "Killer Bees" because 6 of their 11 starters had last names that began with the letter "B". The "Killer Bees", anchored by Pro Bowl defensive tackle Bob Baumhower, led the league in fewest total yards allowed (2,312) and fewest passing yards allowed (1,027). Linebacker A. J. Duhe was extremely effective at blitzing and in pass coverage. And the Dolphins secondary, consisting of defensive backs Don McNeal, Gerald Small and brothers Lyle and Glenn Blackwood, combined for 11 interceptions.

However, the Dolphins' passing attack, led by quarterback David Woodley, ranked last in the league with 1,401 total yards, 8 touchdowns, and 13 interceptions. One of the few bright spots in the Dolphins passing attack was wide receiver Jimmy Cefalo, who gained 356 yards off just 17 receptions, an average of 20.9 yards per catch. Wide receiver Duriel Harris also provided a deep threat with 22 receptions for 331 yards.

But Miami's strength on offense was their running game, ranking 3rd in the league with 1,344 yards. Pro Bowl running back Andra Franklin was the team's top rusher with 701 yards and 7 touchdowns. Running back Tony Nathan rushed for 233 yards, and caught 16 passes for another 114 yards. Woodley himself also recorded 207 rushing yards and 2 touchdowns. One reason for the Dolphins' rushing success was the blocking of their offensive line, led by future hall of fame center Dwight Stephenson, along with Pro Bowlers Bob Kuechenberg and Ed Newman.

=== Snowplow Game ===
In National Football League lore, the Snowplow Game refers to a regular-season game played between the Miami Dolphins and New England Patriots on December 12, 1982.

Playing in a heavy snowstorm at New England's Schaefer Stadium in Foxborough, Massachusetts, the two teams remained scoreless late into the fourth quarter. With 4:45 left to go in the game and on-field conditions worsening, Patriots coach Ron Meyer summoned Mark Henderson, who was a convict on a work release program, and was the stadium's snowplow operator that afternoon – and in the face of furious protests from Miami coach Don Shula – was directed to veer off course and clear a spot on the field for placekicker John Smith, with Matt Cavanaugh putting down the hold. The kick was good and the Patriots took a 3–0 lead into the final minutes of the game.

What is often left untold is what happened after John Smith kicked the go-ahead field goal. Despite the snowy conditions, the Dolphins methodically marched down the field on the strength of their running backs Andra Franklin and Tony Nathan and quarterback David Woodley. The Dolphins advanced the ball to just inside the Patriots' 20-yard line, but on a third-down-and-nine play, a pass from Woodley was intercepted by linebacker Don Blackmon. With less than a minute left to play, Miami used their timeouts to stop the clock and forced New England to punt after three rushing attempts, but a Dolphins Hail Mary pass on the game's final play was intercepted by the Patriots' Roland James.

Henderson was released from prison a few years after the game, and later worked in the construction business. Henderson's plow was actually a John Deere Model 314 tractor with a snow sweeper attached.When he was being interviewed by a TV reporter about the controversy, Henderson jokingly replied, "What are they gonna do, throw me in jail?" Weeks after the game, the NFL banned the use of snowplows on the field during a game. The moment became a feature of The Hall at Patriot Place when it opened in 2008 next to Gillette Stadium, with the actual tractor on display there.

=== Schedule ===
Week	Date	Opponent	Result	Record	Venue	Attendance
1	September 12	at **New York Jets**	**W** 45–28	1–0	Shea Stadium	53,360
2	September 19	**Baltimore Colts**	**W** 24–20	2–0	Orange Bowl	51,999
Players' strike
3	November 21	at **Buffalo Bills**	**W** 9–7	3–0	Rich Stadium	52,945
4	November 29	at Tampa Bay Buccaneers	**L** 17–23	3–1	Tampa Stadium	65,854
5	December 5	Minnesota Vikings	**W** 22–14	4–1	Orange Bowl	45,721
6	December 12	at **New England Patriots**	**L** 0–3	4–2	Schaefer Stadium	25,716
7	December 18	**New York Jets**	**W** 20–19	5–2	Orange Bowl	67,702
8	December 27	**Buffalo Bills**	**W** 27–10	6–2	Orange Bowl	73,924
9	January 2, 1983	at **Baltimore Colts**	**W** 34–7	7–2	Memorial Stadium	19,073
Note: Intra-division opponents are in **bold** text.

=== Season summary ===
==== Week 1 at Jets ====
Week One: Miami Dolphins (0–0) at New York Jets (0–0)

Quarter	1	2	3	4	Total
Dolphins	14	10	21	0	**45**
Jets	7	7	0	14	**28**

at Shea Stadium • Flushing, New York

- Date: September 12
- Game time: 4:00 p.m. EDT
- Game weather: 75 °F (24 °C) • Wind 9 miles per hour (14 km/h; 7.8 kn)
- Game attendance: 53,360
- Referee: Dick Jorgensen
- TV announcers (NBC): Charlie Jones and Len Dawson
- Pro-Football-Reference.com

Game information

Dolphins

- David Woodley
  14/22, 98 Yds, INT
- Andra Franklin
  29 Rush, 103 Yds, 2 TD
- Jimmy Cefalo
  2 Rec, 25 Yds

Jets

- Richard Todd
  18/30, 233 Yds, 3 TD, 3 INT
- Freeman McNeil
  13 Rush, 116 Yds
- Jerome Barkum
  4 Rec, 71 Yds, TD

Scoring summary

Quarter	Time	Drive			Team	Scoring information	Score	
Quarter	Time	Plays	Yards	TOP	Team	Scoring information	MIA	NYJ
1					Dolphins	Andra Franklin 1-yard touchdown run, Uwe von Schamann kick good	7	0
1					Jets	Wesley Walker 29-yard touchdown reception from Richard Todd, Pat Leahy kick good	7	7
1					Dolphins	Punt returned 59 yards for touchdown by Tommy Vigorito, Uwe von Schamann kick good	14	7
2					Dolphins	Andra Franklin 1-yard touchdown run, Uwe von Schamann kick good	21	7
2					Dolphins	25-yard field goal by Uwe von Schamann	24	7
2					Jets	Mike Augustyniak 2-yard touchdown run, Pat Leahy kick good	24	14
3					Dolphins	David Woodley 15-yard touchdown reception from Tony Nathan, Uwe von Schamann kick good	31	14
3					Dolphins	Interception returned 35 yards for touchdown by Glenn Blackwood, Uwe von Schamann kick good	38	14
3					Dolphins	Interception returned 19 yards for touchdown by Don McNeal, Uwe von Schamann kick good	45	14
4					Jets	Jerome Barkum 7-yard touchdown reception from Richard Todd, Pat Leahy kick good	45	21
4					Jets	Wesley Walker 5-yard touchdown reception from Richard Todd, Pat Leahy kick good	45	28
"TOP" = time of possession. For other American football terms, see Glossary of American football.							45	28

==== Week 2 ====
Team	1	2	3	4	Total
Colts	0	17	0	3	20
• Dolphins	14	0	10	0	24

- Date: September 19
- Location: Orange Bowl, Miami, Florida
- Game start: 4:00 p.m.
- Game weather: 82 °F (28 °C); wind 5 mph (8.0 km/h)
- Referee: Pat Haggerty
- TV announcers (NBC): Gary Gerould, Jim Turner

Scoring summary
Q1	MIA	Woodley 1-yard run (von Schamann kick)	MIA 7–0
Q1	MIA	Hardy 4-yard pass from Woodley (von Schamann kick)	MIA 14–0
Q2	BAL	Butler 53-yard pass from Pagel (Wood kick)	MIA 14–7
Q2	BAL	Wood 51-yard field goal	MIA 14–10
Q2	BAL	Krauss 5-yard pass from Pagel (Wood kick)	BAL 17–14
Q3	MIA	Vigorito 33-yard run (von Schamann kick)	MIA 21–17
Q3	MIA	von Schamann 29-yard field goal	MIA 24–17
Q4	BAL	Wood 48-yard field goal	MIA 24–20

==== Week 15 vs Jets ====
Week Fifteen: New York Jets (5–1) at Miami Dolphins (4–1)

Quarter	1	2	3	4	Total
Jets	6	10	0	3	**19**
**Dolphins**	10	7	0	3	**20**

at Orange Bowl, Miami, Florida

- Date: December 18, 1982
- Game time: 12:30 p.m. EDT
- Game weather: Sunny, 56 °F (13 °C)
- Game attendance: 67,702
- Referee: Bob McElwee
- TV announcers (NBC): Don Criqui, John Brodie, and Bob Griese
- Box Score

The 1972 Miami Dolphins team was honored during the game.

Team	Category	Player	Statistics
Jets	Passing	Richard Todd	16/29, 174 Yds, 2 TD, 2 INT
Jets	Rushing	Freeman McNeil	21 Rush, 89 Yds
Jets	Receiving	Wesley Walker	7 Rec, 96 Yds, TD
Dolphins	Passing	David Woodley	12/25, 148 Yds, TD, 2 INT
Dolphins	Rushing	Andra Franklin	17 Rush, 75 Yds, TD
Dolphins	Receiving	Duriel Harris	4 Rec, 74 Yds, TD

Scoring summary

Quarter	Time	Drive			Team	Scoring information	Score	
Quarter	Time	Plays	Yards	TOP	Team	Scoring information	NYJ	MIA
1					Jets	Wesley Walker 22-yard touchdown reception from Richard Todd, Pat Leahy kick no good (wide left)	6	0
1					Dolphins	47-yard field goal by Uwe von Schamann	6	3
1					Dolphins	Andra Franklin 25-yard touchdown run, Uwe von Schamann kick good	6	10
2					Jets	Derrick Gaffney 45-yard touchdown reception from Richard Todd, Pat Leahy kick good	13	10
2					Dolphins	Duriel Harris 36-yard touchdown reception from David Woodley, Uwe von Schamann kick good	13	17
2					Jets	40-yard field goal by Pat Leahy	16	17
4					Jets	49-yard field goal by Pat Leahy	19	17
4	0:03				Dolphins	47-yard field goal by Uwe von Schamann	19	20
"TOP" = time of possession. For other American football terms, see Glossary of American football.							19	20

=== Playoffs ===
Round	Date	Opponent (seed)	Result	Record	Venue	Attendance
First round	January 8, 1983	New England Patriots (7)	**W** 28–13	1–0	Orange Bowl	68,842
Divisional	January 16, 1983	San Diego Chargers (5)	**W** 34–13	2–0	Orange Bowl	71,383
AFC Championship	January 23, 1983	New York Jets (6)	**W** 14–0	3–0	Orange Bowl	67,396
Super Bowl XVII	January 30, 1983	Washington Redskins (N1)	**L** 17–27	3–1	Rose Bowl	103,667

=== Standings ===
AFC East
	W	L	T	PCT	DIV	CONF	PF	PA	STK
^{(2)} Miami Dolphins	7	2	0	.778	6–1	6–1	198	131	W3
^{(6)} New York Jets	6	3	0	.667	2–2	2–3	245	166	L1
^{(7)} New England Patriots	5	4	0	.556	3–1	5–3	143	157	W1
Buffalo Bills	4	5	0	.444	1–3	3–3	150	154	L3
Baltimore Colts	0	8	1	.056	0–5	0–7	113	236	L2

AFC
#	Team	W	L	T	PCT	PF	PA	STK
**Seeded postseason qualifiers**
1	Los Angeles Raiders	8	1	0	.889	260	200	W5
2 (Note: Miami finished ahead of Cincinnati based on better conference record (6–1 to Cincinnati’s 6–2).)	Miami Dolphins	7	2	0	.778	198	131	W3
3	Cincinnati Bengals	7	2	0	.778	232	177	W2
4 (Note: Pittsburgh finished ahead of San Diego based on better record against common opponents (3–1 to Chargers' 2–1). Conference tiebreak was initially used to eliminate New York Jets.) (Note: Pittsburgh and San Diego finished ahead of New York Jets based on conference record (Pittsburgh and San Diego 5–3 against Jets’ 2–3))	Pittsburgh Steelers	6	3	0	.667	204	146	W2
5	San Diego Chargers	6	3	0	.667	288	221	L1
6	New York Jets	6	3	0	.667	245	166	L1
7	New England Patriots	5	4	0	.556	143	157	W1
8 (Note: Cleveland finished ahead of Buffalo and Buffalo ahead of Seattle based on conference record (4–3 to Buffalo’s 3–3 to Seattle’s 3–5).)	Cleveland Browns	4	5	0	.444	140	182	L1
**Did not qualify for the postseason**
9	Buffalo Bills	4	5	0	.444	150	154	L3
10	Seattle Seahawks	4	5	0	.444	127	147	W1
11	Kansas City Chiefs	3	6	0	.333	176	184	W1
12	Denver Broncos	2	7	0	.222	148	226	L3
13	Houston Oilers	1	8	0	.111	136	245	L7
14	Baltimore Colts	0	8	1	.056	113	236	L2
**Tiebreakers**

== Postseason ==
=== AFC first round ===
- Miami Dolphins 28, New England Patriots 13

=== AFC Divisional Playoff ===
- Miami Dolphins 34, San Diego Chargers 13

Quarter	1	2	3	4	Total
Chargers	0	13	0	0	13
Dolphins	7	20	0	7	34

at Miami Orange Bowl, Miami, Florida

- Game time: 12:30 p.m. EST
- Game weather: 64 °F (18 °C), mostly cloudy
- Referee: Jerry Markbreit
- TV announcers (NBC): Don Criqui, John Brodie, and Bob Griese

=== AFC Championship Game ===
- Miami Dolphins 14, New York Jets 0. The Jets were angered by the condition of the Orange Bowl's grass field, which had not been covered and was inundated with a huge amount of rainfall from a series of storms that swept through South Florida the week before the game (it was still overcast on the Sunday of the game but only had a minor drizzle). Don Shula responded by stating that he hadn't checked the weather reports because he was focused on getting the Dolphins ready for the game, and that both teams would face the same conditions in any case. AJ Duhe intercepted Richard Todd 3 times, returning the last pick for a game-clinching touchdown.

=== Super Bowl XVII ===
- Miami Dolphins 17, Washington Redskins 27

at Rose Bowl (stadium), Pasadena, California

==== Scoring summary ====
- MIA – TD: Jimmy Cefalo 76-yard pass from David Woodley (Uwe von Schamann kick) 7–0 MIA
- WAS – FG: Mark Moseley 31 yards 7–3 MIA
- MIA – FG: Uwe von Schamann 20 yards 10–3 MIA
- WAS – TD: Alvin Garrett 4-yard pass from Joe Theismann (Mark Moseley kick) 10–10 tie
- MIA – TD: Fulton Walker 98-yard kickoff return (Uwe von Schamann kick) 17–10 MIA
- WAS – FG: Mark Moseley 20 yards 17–13 MIA
- WAS – TD: John Riggins 43-yard run (Mark Moseley kick) 20–17 WAS
- WAS – TD: Charlie Brown 6-yard pass from Joe Theismann (Mark Moseley kick) 27–17 WAS

== Awards and honors ==
Pro Bowl players FB Andra Franklin, NT Bob Baumhower

== Notes and references ==
- Miami Dolphins on Pro Football Reference
- Miami Dolphins on jt-sw.com
