= 1983 Miami Dolphins season =

18th season in franchise history

- Owner: Joe Robbie
- Head coach: Don Shula
- Defensive coordinator: Bill Arnsparger
- Home stadium: Orange Bowl

Results
- Record: 12–4
- Division place: 1st AFC East
- Playoffs: Lost Divisional Playoffs (vs. Seahawks) 20–27
- Pro Bowlers: 7 QB Dan Marino; WR Mark Duper; G Bob Kuechenberg; C Dwight Stephenson; G Ed Newman; DE Doug Betters; DT Bob Baumhower

The 1983 Miami Dolphins season was the 18th season in football for the Miami Dolphins and they sought to return to the Super Bowl after losing to the Washington Redskins in Super Bowl XVII. It was also a turning point in the team's history, as in the 1983 NFL draft a young quarterback slipped to deep in the opening round, being passed over by such teams as division rivals New York who drafted Ken O'Brien and New England who drafted Tony Eason. With the 27th pick, the Dolphins decided to take a chance on Dan Marino. In the draft's eighth round the Dolphins also selected receiver Mark Clayton.

== Season summary ==
David Woodley started the team's first five games but despite wins over Buffalo, New England and Kansas City the offense did not move to Don Shula's liking. So in Week Six, with the Dolphins hosting the Bills the rookie Marino started. Marino had completed two touchdown passes in relief of Woodley in a 27–14 loss to the Raiders and then replaced Woodley during a 17–7 loss to the Saints with a touchdown and an interception, so the game against Buffalo was the third game of his career but his first start. The game proved to be a wild affair as Robb Riddick of the Bills fumbled the opening kickoff at his own 17 but Marino was intercepted by Steve Freeman on the next play. The Bills clawed to a 14–7 halftime lead but the Dolphins behind Marino stayed toe to toe as Marino threw for 322 yards and four touchdowns while handing off to Mark Clayton on an option pass for a touchdown to Mark Duper. The Bills tied the game in the final seconds and two Uwe von Schamann field goal attempts missed before Joe Danelo ended the game in a 38–35 Bills win.

Despite the loss Marino's performance cemented his role as the team's starter, and the Dolphins raced to win nine of their last ten games. Marino finished with 2,210 passing yards, 20 touchdowns and six interceptions. With the division wrapped up following a 26–17 win over the Oilers at the Astrodome Marino sat for the final two games of the season as Don Strock quarterbacked the Dolphins to wins over the Falcons and New York Jets. Despite a very successful season, the Dolphins were eliminated in the Divisional round of the playoffs by the underdog Seattle Seahawks, 27–20.

== Offseason ==
- June 25, 1983: Linebacker Larry Gordon, the Miami Dolphins first round pick in the 1976 NFL draft, died from heart failure while jogging near his home in Phoenix. Miami players wore a memorial helmet decal with Gordon's No. 50 throughout the season. Gordon's death occurred six days shy of the two-year anniversary of the death of fellow Dolphins linebacker Rusty Chambers, and four days before Kansas City Chiefs running back Joe Delaney drowned in Monroe, Louisiana.

=== NFL draft ===
1983 Miami Dolphins draft
Round	Pick	Player	Position	College	Notes
1	27	Dan Marino * ^{†}	Quarterback	Pittsburgh	
2	55	Mike Charles	Defensive tackle	Syracuse	
3	76	Charles Benson	Defensive end	Baylor	
6	167	Reggie Roby *	Punter	Iowa	
7	195	Keith Woetzel	Linebacker	Rutgers	
8	223	Mark Clayton *	Wide receiver	Louisville	
9	250	Mark Brown	Linebacker	Purdue	
10	278	Anthony Reed	Running back	South Carolina State	
11	306	Joe Lukens	Guard	Ohio State	
12	334	Anthony Carter *	Wide receiver	Michigan	
Made roster † Pro Football Hall of Fame * Made at least one Pro Bowl during career

== Personnel ==
=== Coaches / Staff ===
1983 Miami Dolphins staff
Front office: Owner / Team President – Joe Robbie; Executive vice president/general manager – Mike Robbie; Vice president – Don Shula; Director of player personnel – Chuck Connor; Director of pro scouting – Charley Winner; Head coaches: Head coach – Don Shula; Assistant head coach – Bill Arnsparger; Offensive coaches: Offensive backs – Carl Taseff; Receivers – David Shula; Offensive line – John Sandusky	Defensive coaches: Defense – Bill Arnsparger; Defensive line/run defense – Mike Scarry; Defensive backs – Tom Keane; Special teams coaches: Special teams – Bob Matheson; Punting – Tom Keane; Strength and conditioning: Strength and flexibility – Junior Wade

=== Roster ===
1983 Miami Dolphins roster
Quarterbacks (QB): 13 Dan Marino; 10 Don Strock; 16 David Woodley; Running backs (RB): 34 Woody Bennett; 37 Andra Franklin; 31 Eddie Hill; 22 Tony Nathan; 20 David Overstreet; Wide receivers (WR): 83 Mark Clayton; 85 Mark Duper; 82 Duriel Harris; 88 Vince Heflin; 11 Jim Jensen; 89 Nat Moore; Tight ends (TE): 84 Bruce Hardy; 87 Dan Johnson; 80 Joe Rose	Offensive linemen (OL): 76 Steve Clark G; 61 Roy Foster T/G; 79 Jon Giesler T; 74 Cleveland Green T; 67 Bob Kuechenberg G; 68 Eric Laakso T; 64 Ed Newman G; 57 Dwight Stephenson C; 60 Jeff Toews G/C; Defensive linemen (DL): 70 Bill Barnett DE; 73 Bob Baumhower NT; 78 Charles Benson DE; 75 Doug Betters DE; 58 Kim Bokamper DE; 71 Mike Charles NT	Linebackers (LB): 51 Mark Brown ILB; 56 Charles Bowser OLB; 59 Bob Brudzinski OLB; 77 A. J. Duhe ILB; 55 Earnie Rhone ILB; 52 Terry Tautolo OLB; 54 Rodell Thomas ILB; Defensive backs (DB): 47 Glenn Blackwood SS; 42 Lyle Blackwood FS; 49 William Judson CB; 40 Mike Kozlowski SS; 44 Paul Lankford CB; 48 Gerald Small CB; 45 Robert Sowell CB; 41 Fulton Walker CB; Special teams (ST): 4 Reggie Roby P; 5 Uwe von Schamann K	Reserve: 81 Jimmy Cefalo WR (IR); 63 Mark Dennard C (IR); 53 Ron Hester LB (IR); 28 Don McNeal CB (IR); 52 Steve Shull LB (IR); 52 Emmett Tilley LB (IR); 32 Tommy Vigorito RB (IR); Rookies in italics

== Regular season ==
=== Schedule ===
Week	Date	Opponent	Result	Record	Venue	Attendance
1	September 4	at **Buffalo Bills**	**W** 12–0	1–0	Rich Stadium	78,715
2	September 11	**New England Patriots**	**W** 34–24	2–0	Miami Orange Bowl	59,343
3	September 19	at Los Angeles Raiders	**L** 14–27	2–1	Los Angeles Memorial Coliseum	57,796
4	September 25	Kansas City Chiefs	**W** 14–6	3–1	Miami Orange Bowl	50,785
5	October 2	at New Orleans Saints	**L** 7–17	3–2	Louisiana Superdome	66,489
6	October 9	**Buffalo Bills**	**L** 35–38 (OT)	3–3	Miami Orange Bowl	59,948
7	October 16	at **New York Jets**	**W** 32–14	4–3	Shea Stadium	58,615
8	October 23	at **Baltimore Colts**	**W** 21–7	5–3	Memorial Stadium	32,343
9	October 30	Los Angeles Rams	**W** 30–14	6–3	Miami Orange Bowl	72,175
10	November 6	at San Francisco 49ers	**W** 20–17	7–3	Candlestick Park	57,832
11	November 13	at **New England Patriots**	**L** 6–17	7–4	Sullivan Stadium	60,771
12	November 20	**Baltimore Colts**	**W** 37–0	8–4	Miami Orange Bowl	54,482
13	November 28	Cincinnati Bengals	**W** 38–14	9–4	Miami Orange Bowl	74,506
14	December 4	at Houston Oilers	**W** 24–17	10–4	Houston Astrodome	39,434
15	December 10	Atlanta Falcons	**W** 31–24	11–4	Miami Orange Bowl	56,725
16	December 16	**New York Jets**	**W** 34–14	12–4	Miami Orange Bowl	59,975
Note: Intra-division opponents are in **bold** text.

=== Game summaries ===
==== Week 1 ====
Team	1	2	3	4	Total
• Dolphins	0	6	3	3	12
Bills	0	0	0	0	0

- Date: September 4
- Location: Rich Stadium, Orchard Park, New York
- Game start: 1:00 p.m. EST
- Game attendance: 78,715
- Game weather: 72 °F (22 °C); wind 12 mph (19 km/h)
- Referee: Jim Tunney
- TV announcers (NBC): Charlie Jones and Bob Griese

Scoring summary
Q2	MIA	von Schamann 33 yard field goal	MIA 3–0
Q2	MIA	von Schamann 23 yard field goal	MIA 6–0
Q3	MIA	von Schamann 36 yard field goal	MIA 9–0
Q4	MIA	von Schamann 50 yard field goal	MIA 12–0

=== Week 6 ===
Dan Marino first start in NFL

Team	1	2	3	4	OT	Total
• Bills	7	7	7	14	3	38
Dolphins	0	7	14	14	0	35

- Date: October 9
- Location: Orange Bowl
- Game attendance: 59,948
- Referee: Fred Silva
- TV announcers (NBC): Charlie Jones and Bob Griese

=== Standings ===
AFC East
	W	L	T	PCT	DIV	CONF	PF	PA	STK
^{(2)} Miami Dolphins	12	4	0	.750	6–2	9–3	389	250	W5
New England Patriots	8	8	0	.500	4–4	6–6	274	289	L1
Buffalo Bills	8	8	0	.500	4–4	7–5	283	351	L2
Baltimore Colts	7	9	0	.438	3–5	5–9	264	354	W1
New York Jets	7	9	0	.438	3–5	4–8	313	331	L2

== Player stats ==
=== Passing ===
Player	Att	Comp	Yds	TD	INT	Rating
Dan Marino	296	173	2210	20	6	96.0

== Postseason ==
=== AFC Divisional Playoff ===
Seattle Seahawks 27, Miami Dolphins 20

Quarter	1	2	3	4	Total
Seahawks	0	7	7	13	27
Dolphins	0	13	0	7	20

at Miami Orange Bowl, Miami, Florida

- Game time: 12:30 p.m. EST
- Game weather: 51 °F (11 °C), light rain
- Game attendance: 71,032
- Referee: Fred Wyant
- TV announcers (NBC): Marv Albert and Bob Trumpy

The Seahawks converted three turnovers in the second half into 13 points, while running back Curt Warner rushed for 113 yards and 2 touchdowns. Dolphins quarterback Dan Marino threw two touchdown passes in the second quarter: A 19-yard pass to Johnson and a 32-yard pass to wide receiver Mark Duper. Seattle's only score in the first half was quarterback Dave Krieg's 6-yard touchdown pass to running back Cullen Bryant. In the third quarter, a fumble led to Warner's 1-yard touchdown. A fourth quarter interception from Marino then led to Norm Johnson's 27-yard field goal to give Seattle a 17–13 lead. After the Dolphins regained the lead off running back Woody Bennett's 3-yard touchdown, Seattle responded with Warner's 2-yard touchdown. On the ensuing kickoff, Miami returner Fulton Walker fumbled, setting up Norm Johnson's 37-yard field goal. Barely enough time remained for the Dolphins to tie the game, but Fulton Walker fumbled the next kickoff as well, which sealed the game for the Seahawks.
