= 1981 Miami Dolphins season =

16th season in franchise history

- General manager: Mike Robbie
- Head coach: Don Shula
- Defensive coordinator: Bill Arnsparger
- Home stadium: Orange Bowl

Results
- Record: 11–4–1
- Division place: 1st AFC East
- Playoffs: Lost Divisional Playoffs (vs. Chargers) 38–41 (OT)
- Pro Bowlers: 2 DT Bob Baumhower; G Ed Newman

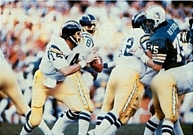
The Dolphins facing the Chargers in the AFC Divisional Playoff known as the "Epic in Miami".

The 1981 Miami Dolphins season was the 16th year of existence for the Miami Dolphins franchise and 12th in the National Football League (NFL). After a mediocre season in 1980, where the team finished at 8–8 and missed the playoffs, the Dolphins made a return to the playoffs, winning the AFC East with an 11–4–1 record.

== Season summary ==
With the retirement of Bob Griese, not much was expected out of the Dolphins. The Dolphins Defense became known as the Killer Bees because of the number of players whose last name began with the letter B; Bill Barnett, Bob Baumhauer, Lyle Blackwood, Kim Bokamper, and Bob Brudzinski anchored a strong team. Don Shula reached a milestone by winning his 200th game of his coaching career. In the Divisional Playoffs against the San Diego Chargers the Dolphins fell behind 24–0 early in front of a sold-out crowd at the Orange Bowl. With time running out in the first half, the Dolphins desperately needed a score to get back in the game. Out of nowhere the Dolphins ran the old schoolyard hook and lateral play to success. On the play, Quarterback Don Strock threw a pass over the middle to WR Duriel Harris, who lateraled to HB Tony Nathan, who ran the ball in for a touchdown. The play sparked the Dolphins, who came back and took a lead in the 4th Quarter. However, the Killer Bees could not contain Chargers QB Dan Fouts, who tied the game and forced overtime, where the Chargers won the game 41–38 on a Rolf Benirschke field goal in the 14th minute of overtime. If it had not been for the player's strike of the following season (where they went 7–2, which would have put them at the top of the AFC East), this would have been the first of five consecutive AFC East titles for the Dolphins.

The Dolphins and Jets played to a 28–28 tie in week five, Miami's most recent draw as of 2025. The Jets tied the Chiefs 17–17 seven years later.

== Offseason ==
- July 1, 1981: Linebacker Rusty Chambers, the Miami Dolphins leading tackler in 1978 and 1979, died in an automobile accident in Tangipahoa Parish, Louisiana. Miami players wore a memorial helmet decal with Chambers' No. 51 throughout the season.

=== NFL draft ===
1981 Miami Dolphins draft
Round	Pick	Player	Position	College	Notes
1	13	David Overstreet	Running back	Oklahoma	
2	56	Andra Franklin *	Running back	Nebraska	
4	84	Sam Greene	Wide receiver	UNLV	
4	96	Brad Wright	Quarterback	New Mexico	
5	126	Ken Poole	Defensive end	Louisiana–Monroe	
5	138	Tommy Vigorito	Running back	Virginia	
6	152	Mack Moore	Defensive end	Texas A&M	
6	154	Fulton Walker	Defensive back	West Virginia	
7	179	Mike Daum	Offensive tackle	Cal Poly	
8	208	William Judson	Defensive back	South Carolina State	
9	235	John Noonan	Wide receiver	Nebraska	
10	261	Steve Folsom	Tight end	Utah	
11	291	Jim Jensen	Wide receiver	Boston University	
12	318	John Alford	Defensive tackle	South Carolina State	
Made roster * Made at least one Pro Bowl during career

== Personnel ==
=== Coaches / Staff ===
1981 Miami Dolphins staff
Front office: Team Owner / President – Joe Robbie; Executive vice president/general manager – Mike Robbie; Vice president – Don Shula; Director of player personnel – Chuck Connor; Director of pro scouting – Charley Winner; Head coaches: Head coach – Don Shula; Assistant head coach - Bill Arnsparger; Offensive coaches: Quarterbacks/receivers – Wally English; Assistant Quarterbacks - Bob Griese; Offensive backs – Carl Taseff; Offensive line/running game – John Sandusky	Defensive coaches: Defensive coordinator/linebackers – Bill Arnsparger; Defensive line/run defense – Mike Scarry; Defensive backs – Tom Keane; Special teams coaches: Special teams – Steve Crosby, Carl Taseff; Punting – Tom Keane

=== Roster ===
1981 Miami Dolphins roster
Quarterbacks (QB): 11 Jim Jensen; 10 Don Strock; 16 David Woodley; Running backs (RB): 37 Andra Franklin; 31 Eddie Hill; 33 Bo Matthews; 22 Tony Nathan; 32 Tommy Vigorito; Wide receivers (WR): 88 Elmer Bailey; 81 Jimmy Cefalo; 82 Duriel Harris; 89 Nat Moore; Tight ends (TE): 84 Bruce Hardy; 86 Ronnie Lee; 80 Joe Rose	Offensive linemen (OL): 63 Mark Dennard C; 79 Jon Giesler T; 74 Cleveland Green T; 67 Bob Kuechenberg G; 68 Eric Laakso T; 64 Ed Newman G; 57 Dwight Stephenson C; 60 Jeff Toews G; Defensive linemen (DL): 70 Bill Barnett DE; 73 Bob Baumhower NT; 75 Doug Betters DE; 58 Kim Bokamper DE; 83 Vern Den Herder DE; 78 Ken Poole NT	Linebackers (LB): 59 Bob Brudzinski OLB; 77 A. J. Duhe ILB; 50 Larry Gordon OLB; 54 Steve Potter ILB; 55 Earnie Rhone ILB; 52 Steve Shull OLB; Defensive backs (DB): 46 Don Bessillieu FS; 47 Glenn Blackwood SS; 42 Lyle Blackwood FS; 40 Mike Kozlowski SS; 28 Don McNeal CB; 43 Ricky Ray CB; 48 Gerald Small CB; 41 Fulton Walker CB; Special teams (ST): 3 Tom Orosz P; 5 Uwe von Schamann K	Reserve: 34 Woody Bennett RB (IR); 56 Thomas Henderson LB (IR); 38 Steve Howell RB (IR); 49 William Judson CB (IR); 38 Terry Robiskie RB (IR); 45 Ed Taylor CB (IR); Rookies in italics 45 active, 6 reserve

== Regular season ==
The Dolphins won the AFC East title behind second-year quarterback David Woodley and a running attack that managed 2,173 yards and 18 touchdowns. In their eight divisional games they swept the Colts and Patriots but split with Buffalo and went winless against a resurgent Jets squad; they tied the Jets 28–28 at Miami then lost at Shea Stadium 16–15. They won their last four games of the season to finish 11–4–1.

=== Schedule ===
Week	Date	Opponent	Result	Record	Venue	Attendance
1	September 6	at St. Louis Cardinals	**W** 20–7	1–0	Busch Memorial Stadium	50,351
2	September 10	Pittsburgh Steelers	**W** 30–10	2–0	Miami Orange Bowl	75,059
3	September 20	at Houston Oilers	**W** 16–10	3–0	Houston Astrodome	47,379
4	September 27	at **Baltimore Colts**	**W** 31–28	4–0	Memorial Stadium	41,630
5	October 4	**New York Jets**	**T** 28–28 (OT)	4–0–1	Miami Orange Bowl	68,723
6	October 12	at **Buffalo Bills**	**L** 21–31	4–1–1	Rich Stadium	78,576
7	October 18	Washington Redskins	**W** 13–10	5–1–1	Miami Orange Bowl	47,367
8	October 25	at Dallas Cowboys	**L** 27–28	5–2–1	Texas Stadium	64,221
9	November 1	**Baltimore Colts**	**W** 27–10	6–2–1	Miami Orange Bowl	46,061
10	November 8	at **New England Patriots**	**W** 30–27 (OT)	7–2–1	Schaefer Stadium	60,436
11	November 15	Oakland Raiders	**L** 17–33	7–3–1	Miami Orange Bowl	61,777
12	November 22	at **New York Jets**	**L** 15–16	7–4–1	Shea Stadium	59,962
13	November 30	Philadelphia Eagles	**W** 13–10	8–4–1	Miami Orange Bowl	67,797
14	December 6	**New England Patriots**	**W** 24–14	9–4–1	Miami Orange Bowl	50,421
15	December 13	at Kansas City Chiefs	**W** 17–7	10–4–1	Arrowhead Stadium	57,407
16	December 19	**Buffalo Bills**	**W** 16–6	11–4–1	Miami Orange Bowl	72,956
Note: Intra-division opponents are in **bold** text.

=== Standings ===
AFC East
	W	L	T	PCT	DIV	CONF	PF	PA	STK
^{(2)} Miami Dolphins	11	4	1	.719	5–2–1	8–3–1	345	275	W4
^{(4)} New York Jets	10	5	1	.656	6–1–1	8–5–1	355	287	W2
^{(5)} Buffalo Bills	10	6	0	.625	6–2	9–3	311	276	L1
Baltimore Colts	2	14	0	.125	2–6	2–10	259	533	W1
New England Patriots	2	14	0	.125	0–8	2–10	322	370	L9

== Playoffs ==
The Dolphins returned to the playoffs after a one-year absence, hosting the "Air Coryell" Chargers in one of the greatest playoff games in NFL history.

Round	Date	Opponent (seed)	Result	Record	Venue	Attendance
Divisional	January 2, 1982	San Diego Chargers (3)	L 38–41 (OT)	0–1	Miami Orange Bowl	73,735
