= Epic in Miami =

American football playoff game in 1982

The Epic in Miami
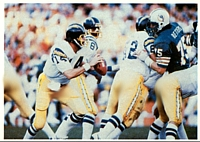
- Chargers' quarterback Dan Fouts (middle) running a play during the game.
San Diego Chargers (3) (10–6)	Miami Dolphins (2) (11–4–1)
41	38
Head coach: Don Coryell	Head coach: Don Shula
	1	2	3	4	OT	Total
SD	24	0	7	7	3	41
MIA	0	17	14	7	0	38
- Date: January 2, 1982
- Stadium: Miami Orange Bowl; Miami, Florida
- Referee: Fred Wyant

TV in the United States
- Network: NBC
- Announcers: Don Criqui and John Brodie

The Epic in Miami was the National Football League AFC divisional playoff game between the San Diego Chargers and Miami Dolphins that took place on January 2, 1982 in the Miami Orange Bowl. The game, won by the Chargers in overtime, 41–38, is one of the most famous in National Football League lore because of the enormity of scoring (79 combined points), the conditions on the field, the performances of players on both teams, and the numerous records that were set.

Many former players, coaches and writers assert it as one of the greatest games in NFL history. It was also referred to in the Miami Herald as the "Miracle That Died", while Sports Illustrated dubbed it the "Game No One Should Have Lost". The game aired on NBC with Don Criqui and John Brodie calling the action and Bryant Gumbel serving as the anchor, one of his final assignments for NBC Sports as he began co-hosting Today two days after the game. NFL 100 Greatest Games rated this game as the 4th greatest game.

== Background ==
=== San Diego Chargers ===
San Diego won their 3rd straight AFC West title in 1981 with a 10–6 record, based on a better division record over Denver, who also finished 10–6. The Chargers' high-powered offense led the NFL in scoring (478 points), passing yards (4,739), and total yards (6,744). Quarterback Dan Fouts made the Pro Bowl for the third year in a row, completing 360 of 609 passes for an NFL record 4,802 yards and 33 touchdowns, with only 17 interceptions. His favorite targets were receivers Charlie Joiner (70 receptions, 1,188 yards, seven touchdowns) and Wes Chandler (52 receptions, 857 yards, five touchdowns in 12 games with San Diego), along with Pro Bowl tight end Kellen Winslow (88 receptions, 1,075 yards, 10 touchdowns). Chandler replaced John Jefferson after Jefferson, following a contract dispute, was traded to Green Bay early in the season. San Diego also had an outstanding rushing attack, led by Pro Bowl running back Chuck Muncie, who rushed for 1,144 yards and a league-leading 19 touchdowns, while also catching 43 passes for 362 yards. Rookie running back James Brooks was also a major contributor, rushing for 525 yards, catching 46 passes for 329 yards, and adding another 1,239 yards returning punts and kickoffs. Up front, their line was anchored by Pro Bowl guard Doug Wilkerson.

However, San Diego's defense ranked 26th of 28 in the league in points allowed (390) and 27th in total yards allowed (6,520). Defensive tackle Gary Johnson from the Chargers defense made the Pro Bowl, and fellow tackle Louie Kelcher was named Second Team All-Pro. Defensive back Willie Buchanon led the team with five interceptions.

=== Miami Dolphins ===
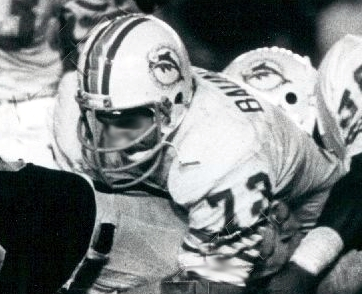
Bob Baumhower was an integral part of Miami's storied defensive line in 1981.

The Dolphins finished the 1981 regular season by winning the AFC East with an 11–4–1 record. Their offense was led by quarterbacks David Woodley and Don Strock. Woodley had a rather mediocre year, throwing for only 2,470 yards (6.7 yards per throw) and 12 touchdowns, with 13 interceptions and a passer rating of only 69.8, but he was a good scrambler, gaining 272 yards and four touchdowns on the ground. Strock was widely considered to be one of the best reserve quarterbacks in the league and had played in 15 of 16 regular-season games, completing 79 of 130 passes for 901 yards (6.7 yards per throw) with six touchdowns and eight interceptions. Receivers Jimmy Cefalo (29 receptions, 631 yards, three touchdowns) and Duriel Harris (53 receptions, 911 yards, two touchdowns) provided the main deep threat on the team. Halfback Tony Nathan was the top rusher on the Dolphins with 782 yards on just 147 carries, giving him a league-leading 5.3-yards-per-carry average, while also catching 50 passes for 432 yards and scoring eight touchdowns. Fullback Andra Franklin provided the team with good blocking, and he was also a good ball carrier, rushing for 711 yards and seven touchdowns; the Dolphins run game in its entirety totaled 2,173 yards (4.06 yards per carry) and 18 touchdowns. Miami's offensive line was anchored by Pro Bowl guard Ed Newman, veteran guard Bob Kuechenberg and center Dwight Stephenson.

Miami's defense ranked fifth in the NFL in fewest points allowed (275). Pro Bowl defensive tackle Bob Baumhower anchored the line, while linebackers A. J. Duhe and Earnie Rhone excelled at blitzing and pass coverage, combining for four interceptions. The Dolphins' secondary, consisting of Mike Kozlowski, Fulton Walker and brothers Lyle and Glenn Blackwood was also extremely talented. The Dolphins had allowed just 27 points in their last three games prior to their playoff matchup against San Diego.

== The game ==
1981 AFC Divisional Playoffs: (3) San Diego Chargers at (2) Miami Dolphins – Game Summary

Quarter	1	2	3	4	OT	Total
Chargers	24	0	7	7	3	41
Dolphins	0	17	14	7	0	38

at Miami Orange Bowl, Miami, Florida

- Date: January 2, 1982
- Game time: 5:00 p.m. EST
- Game weather: 76 °F (24 °C), clear, 80% humidity
- Referee: Fred Wyant
- TV announcers (NBC): Don Criqui and John Brodie
- Pro Football Reference

Game information

First quarter

- SD – Rolf Benirschke 32-yard field goal. Chargers 3–0.
- SD – Wes Chandler 56-yard punt return (Rolf Benirschke kick). Chargers 10–0.
- SD – Chuck Muncie 1-yard run (Rolf Benirschke kick). Chargers 17–0.
- SD – James Brooks 8-yard pass from Dan Fouts (Rolf Benirschke kick). Chargers 24–0.

Second quarter

- MIA – Uwe von Schamann 34-yard field goal. Chargers 24–3.
- MIA – Joe Rose 1-yard pass from Don Strock (Uwe von Schamann kick). Chargers 24–10.
- MIA – Tony Nathan 25-yard lateral pass from Duriel Harris (Uwe von Schamann kick). Chargers 24–17.

Third quarter

- MIA – Joe Rose 15-yard pass from Don Strock (Uwe von Schamann kick). Tied 24–24.
- SD – Kellen Winslow 25-yard pass from Dan Fouts (Rolf Benirschke kick). Chargers 31–24.
- MIA – Bruce Hardy 50-yard pass from Don Strock (Uwe von Schamann kick). Tied 31–31.

Fourth quarter

- MIA – Tony Nathan 12-yard run (Uwe von Schamann kick). Dolphins 38–31.
- SD – James Brooks 9-yard pass from Dan Fouts (Rolf Benirschke kick). Tied 38–38.

Overtime

- SD – Rolf Benirschke 29-yard field goal. Chargers 41–38.

Top passers

- SD – Dan Fouts – 33/53, 433 yards, 3 TD, INT
- MIA – Don Strock – 29/43, 403 yards, 4 TD, INT

Top rushers

- SD – Chuck Muncie – 24 rushes, 120 yards, TD
- MIA – Tony Nathan – 14 rushes, 48 yards, TD

Top receivers

- SD – Kellen Winslow – 13 receptions, 166 yards, TD
- MIA – Tony Nathan – 9 receptions, 114 yards, TD

=== First quarter ===
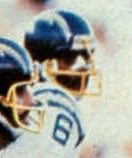
Chuck Muncie led the game in rushes with 120 yards while scoring a touchdown in the first quarter.

San Diego started out the game by driving down the field, featuring a 47-yard completion from Dan Fouts to Wes Chandler on 3rd and 14, and scoring with kicker Rolf Benirschke's 32-yard field goal. The Chargers' defense then forced Miami to punt on its ensuing possession, and Chandler returned the ball 56 yards for a touchdown, increasing his team's lead to 10–0. Then on the ensuing kickoff, the Chargers caught a break when the high, short kick surprisingly bounced back in their direction and was recovered by San Diego. Several plays later, Chuck Muncie scored on a 1-yard touchdown run. Then on the Dolphins' next drive, David Woodley was intercepted by Chargers safety Glen Edwards, who returned the ball 35 yards, setting up Fouts' 8-yard touchdown pass to James Brooks. By the time the first quarter ended, San Diego had a commanding 24–0 lead. It looked like the outcome of the game was already decided.

=== Second quarter ===
After Miami's next drive resulted in an incompletion, two sacks, and a fumble (which Miami recovered), coach Don Shula replaced Woodley with Don Strock early in the second quarter to see whether he could spark the Dolphins offense, and that's precisely what he did, completing a 17-yard pass to Duriel Harris on his first play and leading them down the field to score their first points of the game on a 34-yard field goal by Uwe von Schamann. The Dolphins defense forced and recovered a fumble by Fouts on the ensuing drive, giving the ball back to the offense with great field position on the Chargers 39-yard line. Several plays later, Strock converted the turnover into points with a 1-yard touchdown pass to tight end Joe Rose, cutting the deficit to 24–10. Later in the quarter, San Diego faced a fourth down on the Dolphins 37-yard line. The Chargers decided to send in Benirschke to attempt a 55-yard field goal, but he missed, giving the ball back to the Dolphins near midfield. Three plays later, Miami moved the ball to San Diego's 40-yard line with only six seconds left in the half and an attempt at one last play. In a play known as a "hook and lateral", Strock took the snap and threw to Duriel Harris at the right side of the 25-yard line. Harris caught the ball and immediately lateraled it outside and back to the trailing Tony Nathan. The Chargers defense was completely surprised and Nathan took it untouched for 29 yards down the sideline and a touchdown to cut the deficit to 24–17. Going into the locker rooms at halftime, the Dolphins had closed the game to within one score and regained the momentum.

=== Third and fourth quarters ===
Miami's momentum continued into the second half. Early in the third quarter, Strock led the Dolphins 74 yards down the field and finished the drive with a 15-yard touchdown pass to Rose, tying the game at 24. But this time, San Diego managed to counter with a score of its own. Two drives later, Fouts led the Chargers 60 yards in six plays, scoring on a 25-yard touchdown pass to Kellen Winslow to regain the lead. However, Miami stormed right back with Strock completing numerous passes, the last one a 50-yard scoring strike to tight end Bruce Hardy, tying the game again at 31.

With less than a minute left in the third quarter, San Diego receiver Charlie Joiner slipped while running a deep post route, causing Fouts' pass to go right into the arms of Miami's Lyle Blackwood. After intercepting the pass, Blackwood quickly lateraled the ball to Gerald Small, who returned it to the Chargers 15-yard line, setting up Nathan's 12-yard touchdown run on the first play of the fourth quarter and giving Miami its first lead of the game. Later in the quarter, with the Dolphins just trying to maintain their lead and run out the clock, Chargers defensive tackle Louie Kelcher stripped Dolphins running back Andra Franklin of the ball, which was recovered by San Diego safety Pete Shaw on San Diego's 18-yard line with 4:39 left in regulation. Fouts then led his team down to Miami's nine-yard line. With only 1:06 left in regulation, a heavy Dolphins pass rush forced Fouts to throw a blind pass intended for Winslow in the end zone. The pass sailed over Winslow's head, but went right into the arms of Brooks for a touchdown to tie the game.

In an interview with NFL Network for its program "America's Game: The Missing Rings", Fouts later explained Brooks was not even supposed to be a receiver on the play. Brooks had been assigned to stay in the backfield as a blocker, but with no Miami players coming at him from his side of the field, he decided to run a pass route into the end zone, and by simply running in the same direction as Fouts, he just happened to end up in the right spot to catch the pass intended for Winslow.

Miami took over on its own 40-yard line following Benirschke's squib kick, needing only a field goal to win. Following an incomplete pass, Strock's next throw was intercepted by Willie Buchanon, but as he made the diving catch, he fumbled the ball back to Miami when he hit the ground. After that, Nathan's 17-yard reception and Tommy Vigorito's 6-yard run moved the Dolphins to the Chargers 26-yard line where von Schamann attempted a 43-yard field goal, but at the last second, Winslow extended his 6'5" frame at the line just enough to deflect the kick with his fingers, causing it to fall short of the goal post and sending the game into overtime.

=== Overtime ===
With the players of both teams exhausted and dehydrated, everyone was hoping for a quick end to overtime, but that would not be the case. San Diego won the coin toss and marched down the field, driving inside the Dolphins 10-yard line. Benirschke then attempted a game-winning, 27-yard field goal, but a bad snap and poor hold threw off his timing and the kick sailed wide left. Miami then drove deep into Chargers territory, setting up a 35-yard field goal attempt for von Schamann, but his kick was low, and defensive lineman Leroy Jones managed to leap in the air and block it.

San Diego took over at its own 16-yard line after the blocked field goal. Aided by a pair of receptions by Chandler and a 39-yard catch by Joiner, Fouts led his team 74 yards to Miami's 10-yard line, where Benirschke attempted a 29-yard field goal. This time, his kick was good, giving the Chargers a 41–38 win after 13 minutes and 52 seconds of overtime play.

=== Post-game quotes ===
Said Chargers coach Don Coryell after the game:

"I have coached for 31 or 32 years, and this is tremendous...There has never been a game like this. It was probably the most exciting game in pro football history."

Shula agreed:

"A great game...Maybe the greatest ever."

Chargers running back Hank Bauer:

"The locker-room celebration was more low key than other locker rooms I'd been in. It was more of 'Thank God that's over. Thank God we got out alive.'

NFL on NBC anchor Gumbel:

"If you didn't like this football game, you didn't [sic] like football."

== Records and individual performances ==
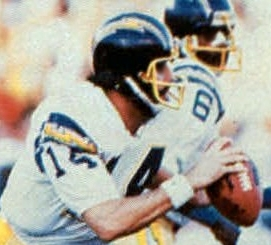
Dan Fouts helped San Diego edge Miami by setting several postseason passing records during the game.

The game featured many new records by players of both teams. By the time it was over Miami and San Diego had set playoff records for the most points scored by both teams (79), most total yards by both teams (1,036), and most passing yards by both teams (809).

Strock had the best single game performance of his career, completing 29 of 43 passes for 403 yards and four touchdowns, a record that still stands for a quarterback coming off the bench. Harris caught six passes for 106 yards. Nathan rushed for 48 yards, caught nine passes for 114 yards, and scored two touchdowns. Hardy caught five passes for 89 yards and a touchdown.

Fouts finished the game completing 33 of 53 passing attempts for a franchise playoff record 433 yards and three touchdowns. His attempts, completions, and passing yards were all NFL postseason records. Joiner caught seven passes for 108 yards. Muncie rushed for 124 yards and a touchdown. In addition to his 56-yard punt return touchdown, Chandler caught six passes for 106 yards. Brooks recorded 143 all-purpose yards (19 rushing, 31 receiving, 85 kickoff return, eight punt return) and a pair of touchdown catches.

But perhaps the best performance of the game was put in by Kellen Winslow. In addition to his blocked field goal, he recorded an NFL playoff record 13 receptions for 166 yards and a touchdown, despite suffering numerous injuries. During the contest, he was treated for a pinched nerve in his shoulder, dehydration, severe cramps, and a gash in his lower lip that required three stitches. A picture of an exhausted Winslow being helped off the field by two teammates after the game is an enduring image in NFL lore and has been replayed constantly ever since.

"I've never felt so close to death before," Winslow said afterward. "That's what Muhammad Ali said in Manila and that's how I felt out there at the end."

== Aftermath ==
=== San Diego Chargers ===
One week after their victory over the Dolphins in Florida's scorching heat, the Chargers traveled to Cincinnati to face the Cincinnati Bengals in the AFC championship game in the coldest game in NFL history based on the wind chill. The air temperature was −9 °F (−23 °C), and wind chill was −59 °F (−51 °C). This ended up being another famous game in NFL lore, and has since become known as the Freezer Bowl. But this time, it did not end well for the Chargers, as they were defeated 27–7 by the Bengals, ending the Chargers season one game short of the Super Bowl for the second consecutive year.

The following season, which was shortened to nine games because of a players strike, Fouts led the Chargers to a 6–3 record and advanced the AFC second round playoffs with a 31–28 win over the Pittsburgh Steelers in AFC first round playoffs, throwing for 333 yards and three touchdowns with no interceptions. But this time, they could not return the AFC Championship Game for the third straight year, as the Dolphins avenged their defeat 34–13 in the AFC second round playoffs, also in Miami.

The loss to Miami in the playoffs after the 1982 season was the last postseason game that Fouts, Winslow, Joiner, and coach Coryell would ever participate in, as the Chargers did not return to the postseason again until 1992. Fouts, Winslow and Joiner all went on to be enshrined in the Pro Football Hall of Fame, without playing in a Super Bowl. The only significant contributors in the Epic in Miami who did go to a Super Bowl were Brooks, who made it to Super Bowl XXIII as a member of the Bengals, guard Ed White, who was a Minnesota Viking for four Super Bowls and Gary "Big Hands" Johnson, who joined former Chargers, and fellow "Bruise Brothers" Louie Kelcher and Fred Dean (who had been traded to eventual Super Bowl champion San Francisco after Week 5, also due to contract problems) winning Super Bowl XIX with the San Francisco 49ers.

The Chargers' victory in this game would be the last time that they defeated the Dolphins in Miami until 2019, by which time the Chargers had moved to Los Angeles.

=== Miami Dolphins ===
Woodley recovered from his poor performance in the Epic in Miami and regained his position as the Dolphins starting quarterback in the following season. In the strike shortened 1982 NFL season, David Woodley led Miami to a 7–2 record and 3 playoff wins to lead the Miami Dolphins to an NFL championship appearance in Super Bowl XVII. One of the playoff wins was a 34–13 divisional win against the Chargers, avenging their loss from the previous season. This time, Woodley was a key contributor for his team, completing 17 of 22 passes for 195 yards and two touchdowns, with one interception, while also rushing for 14 yards and a touchdown on the ground. Miami's defense also dominated Fouts, limiting him to 15 of 34 completions and intercepting him five times. However, Miami ended up losing Super Bowl XVII to the Washington Redskins, 27–17. With the exception of a 76-yard touchdown pass to Jimmy Cefalo in the first quarter, Woodley had a poor performance, completing only 4 of 14 passes for 97 yards and one touchdown, with one interception.

The following season, Woodley lost his starting spot to rookie Dan Marino. Woodley was traded to the Pittsburgh Steelers in 1984 and spent the rest of his career as a backup before retiring after the 1985 season. Don Strock's incredible performance in the Epic in Miami ended up being the main highlight of his career. He spent the rest of his career as a backup and retired after 1988 as a backup for the Cleveland Browns.

Miami made it back to the Super Bowl in 1984, but they lost Super Bowl XIX to the San Francisco 49ers 38–16. None of the primary players in the Epic in Miami ever won a Super Bowl ring, except for left guard Bob Kuechenberg, who was a member of the Dolphins' Super Bowl-winning teams in 1972 and 1973. Two participants, coach Don Shula and center Dwight Stephenson, were enshrined in the Pro Football Hall of Fame.

== Officials ==
- Referee: Fred Wyant (No. 11)
- Umpire: Tommy Hensley (No. 19)
- Head linesman: Dale Williams
- Line judge: Bill Reynolds
- Back judge: Pat Knight
- Side judge: Vince Jacob
- Field judge: Bill O'Brien

== See also ==
- Freezer Bowl – A game played the next week that had reverse temperatures
- 1967 NFL championship game – Considered the coldest game in NFL history, called the Ice Bowl by followers
- List of nicknamed NFL games and plays
