= Duriel Harris =

American football player (born 1954)

No. 26, 82, 86, 84
- Position: Wide receiver

Personal information
- Born: November 27, 1954 (age 71); Port Arthur, Texas, U.S.
- Listed height: 5 ft 11 in (1.80 m)
- Listed weight: 179 lb (81 kg)

Career information
- High school: Stephen F. Austin (Port Arthur)
- College: New Mexico State
- NFL draft: 1976: 3rd round, 80th overall pick

Career history
- Miami Dolphins (1976–1983); Cleveland Browns (1984); Dallas Cowboys (1984); Miami Dolphins (1985)

Awards and highlights
- All-MVC (1975)

Career NFL statistics
- Receptions: 302
- Receiving yards: 5,055
- Receiving touchdowns: 20
- Stats at Pro Football Reference

Duriel LaDon Harris, Jr. (born November 27, 1954) is an American former professional football player who was a wide receiver in the National Football League (NFL) for the Miami Dolphins, Cleveland Browns, and Dallas Cowboys. He played college football for the New Mexico State Aggies.

== Early life ==
Harris attended Stephen F. Austin High School, where he played as a running back.

He accepted a football scholarship from New Mexico State University. As a sophomore, he posted 36 carries for 250 yards at running back. As a junior, he was moved to the "lonesome end" position in the team's wishbone offense, tallying 29 receptions for 701 yards and 7 touchdowns.

As a senior, he registered 34 receptions for 607 yards and 5 touchdowns, ranking fifth in the nation in kickoff returns, including a 104-yard touchdown return against the University of Tulsa.

Even though he had few opportunities to prove his true worth in the Aggies run-oriented offense, he finished his college career with 89 receptions for 1,562 yards (17.5-yard average) and 13 touchdowns.

== Professional career ==
=== Miami Dolphins (first stint) ===
Harris was selected by the Miami Dolphins in the third round (80th overall) of the 1976 NFL draft. He wore number 26 during his rookie season, starting two games at wide receiver out of 12 contests. He finished with 372 yards (third on the team) on 22 receptions and one touchdown. He also stood out as a return specialist, posting 559 yards on 17 kickoffs and a 32.9 yards per return (led the NFL).

In 1977, he switched his jersey number to 82. He appeared in 14 games (4 starts), finishing second on the team in with 34 receptions for 601 yards, 5 touchdowns and a 17.7 yards average per catch (led the team).

Throughout his first years, the Dolphins were a run-oriented team and his role in the passing offense was limited to being the team's deep threat, generally averaging over 17 yards per catch. In 1979, Harris and Nat Moore set a franchise wide receiver tandem with a combined 90 receptions for 1,638 yards. The next year Bruce Hardy passed him on the depth chart at receiver.

In 1981, he regained his starting role, posting 911 yards (led the team) on 53 receptions (led the team) for the second-best total in franchise history, while playing with 2 different starting quarterbacks. Harris was involved in the hook and lateral play at the end of the first half of the 1981 AFC Division Playoff game versus the San Diego Chargers, that became known as The Epic in Miami. Harris received a 40-yard pass from quarterback Don Strock and then lateralled the ball to running back Tony Nathan, who ran the ball 25 yards for a touchdown. The Chargers eventually won the game in overtime.

In 1982, he established a franchise record with a 25.3-yard return average on 56 kickoffs. As a receiver he was second on the team with 22 receptions for 331 yards and one touchdown. The next year, he was passed over on the depth chart by Mark Duper and suffered his worst performance up to that point in his career.

During his time with the Dolphins, Harris had frequent disagreements with Don Shula and their many meetings prompted his teammates to name one of the chairs in the head coach's office "Duriel's Chair".

On March 27, 1984, he was traded to the Cleveland Browns in exchange for a fourth round draft choice (#91-Mike Smith). He left as the second-ranked receiver in Dolphins history with 266 receptions for 4,510 yards. He also took great care of the football, having only 2 fumbles in 8 years.

=== Cleveland Browns ===
In 1984, despite being the second leading receiver for the Cleveland Browns (32 catches for 512 yards), Harris was waived when Marty Schottenheimer replaced Sam Rutigliano as the team's head coach after 11 games, because Schottenheimer considered that he dropped too many passes. His best game came against the New England Patriots, when he had 8 receptions for 136 yards.

=== Dallas Cowboys ===
On November 13, 1984, he was claimed off waivers by the Dallas Cowboys, who were thin at wide receiver after losing Drew Pearson and Butch Johnson, while both Tony Hill and Doug Donley suffered injuries. He only had one receptions for 9 yards during the season. He was cut on September 2, 1985.

=== Miami Dolphins (second stint) ===
On September 24, 1985, he was signed as a free agent by the Miami Dolphins, to provide depth after wide receivers Mark Duper, Nat Moore and Tommy Vigorito suffered injuries. On November 9, he was released after tallying 3 receptions for 24 yards, to make room for Duper to come off the injured reserve list.

== NFL career statistics ==
Legend
**Bold**	Career high

=== Regular season ===
Year	Team	Games		Receiving				
Year	Team	GP	GS	Rec	Yds	Avg	Lng	TD
1976	MIA	12	2	22	372	16.9	44	1
1977	MIA	14	4	34	601	17.7	47	**5**
1978	MIA	**16**	**15**	45	654	14.5	63	3
1979	MIA	15	14	42	798	**19.0**	51	3
1980	MIA	12	3	33	583	17.7	54	2
1981	MIA	15	12	**53**	**911**	17.2	55	2
1982	MIA	9	8	22	331	15.0	45	1
1983	MIA	12	3	15	260	17.3	**64**	1
1984	CLE	11	11	32	512	16.0	43	2
1984	DAL	5	0	1	9	9.0	9	0
1985	MIA	6	0	3	24	8.0	11	0
		127	72	302	5,055	16.7	64	20

=== Playoffs ===
Year	Team	Games		Receiving				
Year	Team	GP	GS	Rec	Yds	Avg	Lng	TD
1978	MIA	1	1	4	42	10.5	19	0
1979	MIA	1	1	3	61	**20.3**	33	**1**
1981	MIA	1	0	**6**	**106**	17.7	30	0
1982	MIA	**4**	**3**	**6**	94	15.7	**36**	0
1983	MIA	1	0	0	0	0.0	0	0
		8	5	19	303	15.9	36	1

== Personal life ==
After football, Harris worked in radio and television broadcasting. He was an actor in television, films, and theater.
