= Snowplow Game =

Controversial American football game

- The snowplow—actually a tractor with a snow sweeper—clearing an area for a field goal attempt
Miami Dolphins (4–1)	New England Patriots (2–3)
0	3
Head coach: Don Shula	Head coach: Ron Meyer
	1	2	3	4	Total
MIA	0	0	0	0	0
NE	0	0	0	3	3
- Date: December 12, 1982
- Stadium: Schaefer Stadium; Foxborough, Massachusetts
- Favorite: Miami by 6
- Referee: Bob Frederic
- Attendance: 25,716

TV in the United States
- Network: NBC
- Announcers: Jay Randolph and Bob Griese

The Snowplow Game was a regular-season National Football League (NFL) game played between the Miami Dolphins and New England Patriots on December 12, 1982, at Schaefer Stadium in Foxborough, Massachusetts. Due in part to icy conditions, the game remained scoreless until late in the fourth quarter, when the snowplow (Note: The equipment in question was actually a snow sweeper, not a bladed snowplow. The contest was referred to as the "snowplow" game as early as January 1983, a name that has persisted.) operator was called in to clear a spot on the snowy field specifically for New England kicker John Smith so he could kick the game-winning field goal to give the Patriots a 3–0 win.

== Background ==
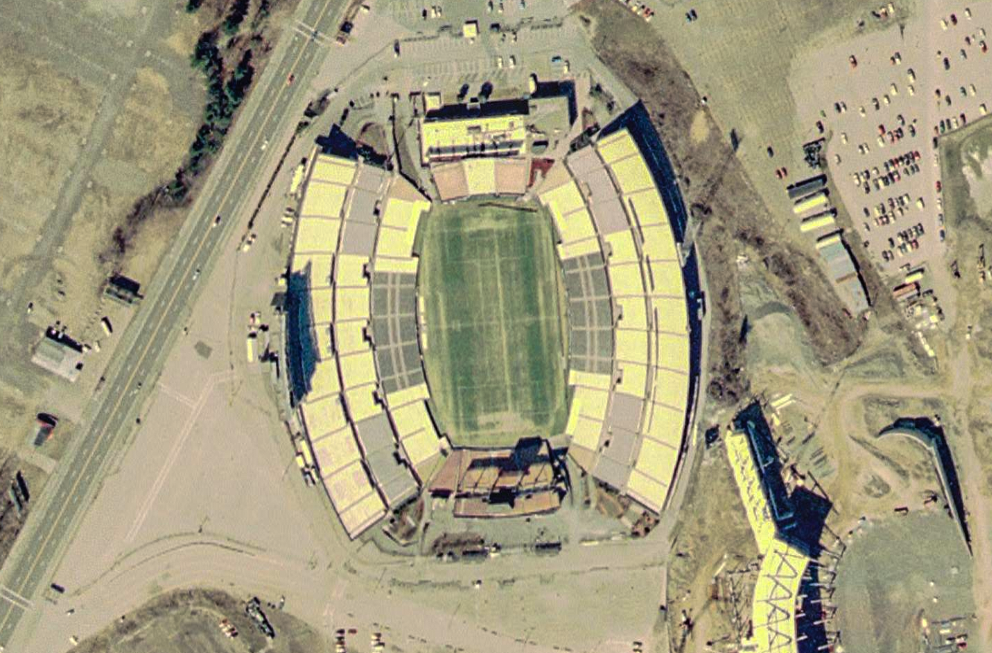
Schaefer Stadium, site of the game

The game took place during the 1982 NFL season, which had been interrupted for eight weeks due to a player's strike. The December 12 game between the New England Patriots and visiting Miami Dolphins was the sixth game for each team. New England, led by head coach Ron Meyer, came into the contest with a record of 2–3, while Miami was 4–1 and led by head coach Don Shula.

The night before this game, heavy rains soaked the AstroTurf surface at New England's Schaefer Stadium in Foxborough, Massachusetts. The field froze over, and conditions were made worse when a snowstorm hit during the game. Attendance at the game was 25,716 people, the smallest crowd for a regular-season NFL game at the venue to that point in time; there were 8,961 no-shows.

== Description ==
Given the weather conditions, an emergency ground rule was put into play where the officials could call timeout and allow the grounds crew to use equipment to clear the yard markers. Despite this, the grounds crew could not move snow often enough to keep the field clear. The teams remained scoreless late into the fourth quarter.

With 4:45 remaining, Patriots head coach Meyer motioned to equipment operator Mark Henderson to clear a spot on the field for placekicker John Smith. (Note: Patriots quarterback Steve Grogan later said that he waved Henderson on the field, although "at this point I don’t remember if it was my idea or Ron Meyer’s.") As Henderson drove across the field—his equipment was a tractor with a snow sweeper—he veered left and departed from the yard markers, clearing a patch of ground that gave Smith a clean spot from which to kick. The kick was good.

As the Dolphins drove down the field for a potential game-tying field goal, Henderson stayed near them, remaining at the ready for the call from the referee to clear a spot for Dolphins kicker Uwe von Schamann. The referee later noted, "We very clearly told coach Shula we would also have swept their area." The Dolphins advanced the ball to just inside the Patriots' 20-yard line, but on a third-down-and-nine play, a pass from quarterback David Woodley was intercepted by linebacker Don Blackmon. With less than a minute left to play, Miami used their timeouts to stop the clock and forced New England to punt after three rushing attempts, but a Dolphins Hail Mary pass on the game's final play was intercepted by the Patriots' Roland James. The Patriots won by a final score of 3–0.

1982 Week 6: Miami Dolphins at New England Patriots – Game summary

Quarter	1	2	3	4	Total
Dolphins	0	0	0	0	0
Patriots	0	0	0	3	3

at Schaefer Stadium, Foxborough, Massachusetts

- Date: December 12, 1982
- Game time: 1:00 p.m. EST
- Game weather: Snow • Temperature: 26 °F (−3 °C) • Wind: 16 mph (26 km/h)
- Game attendance: 25,716
- Referee: Bob Frederic
- TV announcers (NBC): Jay Randolph and Bob Griese
- Box score

Game information

First quarter

- No scoring plays.

Second quarter

- No scoring plays.

Third quarter

- No scoring plays.

Fourth quarter

- NE – John Smith 33-yard field goal.

Officials

- Referee: Bob Frederic (#71)
- Umpire: John Keck (#67)
- Head linesman: Jerry Bergman (#17)
- Line judge: Bob Beeks (#59)
- Back judge: Bill Swanson (#38)
- Side judge: Gary Lane (#120)
- Field judge: Don Hakes (#96)

=== Statistics ===
Statistics	MIA	NE
First downs	16	13
Plays–yards	56–235	48–212
Rushes–yards	38–176	43–199
Passing yards	59	13
Passing: comp–att–int	9–18–2	2–5–1
Turnovers		
Time of possession	31:05	28:55

Team	Category	Player	Statistics
Miami	Passing	David Woodley	9/18, 76 yards, 2 INT
Miami	Rushing	Andra Franklin	23 carries, 107 yards
Miami	Receiving	Duriel Harris	2 receptions, 33 yards
New England	Passing	Steve Grogan	2/5, 13 yards, 1 INT
New England	Rushing	Mark van Eeghen	22 carries, 100 yards
New England	Receiving	Lin Dawson	2 receptions, 13 yards

== Aftermath and legacy ==
The equipment operator, Mark Henderson, a convict on work release, jokingly remarked, "What are they gonna do, throw me in jail?"

Both teams went on to qualify for the playoffs, with the Patriots finishing seventh in the AFC, and the Dolphins finishing second. The normal division-oriented playoff format was scrapped, due to the shortened regular season, in favor of an expanded playoff, dubbed the "Super Bowl Tournament". The Dolphins exacted revenge by eliminating the Patriots in the first round, 28–13 at the Miami Orange Bowl, en route to the Dolphins reaching Super Bowl XVII.

The game itself was the longest that any NFL contest after the AFL–NFL merger (1970) went without a score. The record stood for 25 years, until 2007. Coincidentally, the Dolphins were also the visiting team and losing team in the game that superseded it, falling to the Pittsburgh Steelers, 3–0, on Monday Night Football, with Steelers kicker Jeff Reed registering the only points with 17 seconds left in regulation. The most recently that any NFL game has ended in a scoreless tie is 1943.

In a 2007 interview for an NFL Network segment about the game, Shula recalled protesting the act under Rule 17 (the unfair act clause), which allows the league commissioner to overturn the results of a game if an event extraordinarily outside the realms of accepted practice, such as "non-participant interference," has an effect on the outcome of a game. Commissioner Pete Rozelle responded that, while he agreed wholeheartedly, without a rule explicitly barring the use of such equipment, there was nothing he could do. Meyer, who was also interviewed, said that he didn't see why it was such a controversy at the time, saying, "The only thing I could see (the Dolphins) arguing about was 'unfair competitive advantage'."

The incident is commemorated with an exhibit at the Patriots Hall of Fame within the Patriots' current home, Gillette Stadium. The equipment, a John Deere Model 314 tractor with sweeper attached, hangs from the ceiling.

=== NFL rule changes ===
Before the end of December 1982, the NFL banned the use of snow-clearing equipment on the field during a game.

Until 2018, teams were given a sideline warning on the first offense if a non-player attempted to clear the playing field before being penalized, a situation that came up during the 2017 "Snow Bowl", an Indianapolis–Buffalo contest played in a heavy snowstorm. In 2018, the rule was adjusted, making it "impermissible for the grounds crew or other team personnel to clear away snow", with a 15-yard penalty being immediately enforced for a violation.

NFL rules now prohibit players from using any objects to attempt to alter field conditions. During a game played in heavy rain at Soldier Field in 2022, the Chicago Bears were assessed a 15-yard unsportsmanlike conduct penalty when, prior to a field goal attempt, holder Trenton Gill attempted to use a towel on the field to create a dry patch for kicker Cairo Santos.

== See also ==
- Dolphins–Patriots rivalry
- Tuck Rule Game, played on January 19, 2002, at the same venue
