= Hook and ladder (football) =

Trick play in American or Canadian football

The hook and lateral, also known colloquially as the hook and ladder, is a trick play in American, Canadian football and indoor American football.

The hook and lateral starts with the hook, which is where a wide receiver runs a predetermined distance, usually 10 to 20 yards down the field, and along the sideline, and "hooks in" towards the center of the field to receive a forward pass from the quarterback. Another offensive player (a wide receiver or running back) times a run so that he is at full speed, toward the player with the ball when it is caught. As the defenders close in on the stationary ball carrier, he laterals or hands the ball to the teammate running at full speed in the opposite direction of the original receiver.

If unanticipated, this play puts defenders out of position, running in the wrong direction. If the second receiver catches the lateral in stride, he can be long gone before defenders can react. However, the offense runs a high risk of turning the ball over if it is not handled properly because, unlike a forward pass, a dropped lateral pass results in a live ball.

The hook and ladder is one of two common desperation strategies a trailing team can use at the end of a game, the other being the Hail Mary pass. It has the advantage in that it can be attempted anywhere on the field, whereas the Hail Mary can generally only be attempted at a point on the field where the quarterback's throwing arm is strong enough to reach the end zone with a forward pass.

== Examples ==
- The Miami Dolphins executed a successful "87 Circle Curl Lateral" play at the end of the first half of their AFC playoff game against the San Diego Chargers on January 2, 1982. Wide receiver Duriel Harris caught a 20-yard pass from quarterback Don Strock and then lateraled it to running back Tony Nathan, who ran 25 yards for the score. The play gave the Dolphins huge momentum going into the second half, but the Chargers eventually won in overtime.
- In Week 16 of the 2001 NFL season, the New York Giants trailed the Philadelphia Eagles 24–21 with seven seconds left. From their own 20-yard line, Kerry Collins threw a pass over the middle to Tiki Barber. He ran the ball to the 34 before lateraling it back to Ron Dixon, who sprinted 62 yards up the left sideline before being tackled six yards short of the end zone by safety Damon Moore as time expired. The play, named "86 Lambuth Special" after Dixon's alma mater, subsequently clinched the NFC East for the Eagles and eliminated the Giants from postseason contention.
- The Utah Utes ran a successful version of the play in the 2005 Fiesta Bowl against the Pittsburgh Panthers. Steve Savoy caught the ball on a short pass and lateraled to Paris Warren who took it into the end zone.
- The Boise State Broncos executed the play (called "Circus" in their playbook) against the Oklahoma Sooners on fourth down to force overtime in the 2007 Fiesta Bowl. Boise State later scored a touchdown in overtime on a wide receiver roll out option pass, and won by scoring the ensuing two-point conversion on the rarely-seen Statue of Liberty play.
- The Missouri Tigers executed a hook and lateral to set up a field goal in the fourth quarter of their October 23, 2010 regular season victory over the Oklahoma Sooners, who were at the time ranked number one in the BCS standings.
- The Florida International Golden Panthers successfully ran the play on fourth and 17, with less than a minute remaining, in the 2010 Little Caesars Bowl. This helped set up the game-winning field goal as time expired. In an interview after the game, FIU coach Mario Cristobal said the play was called "Boise", referring to Boise State's play in the 2007 Fiesta Bowl (see more about the play above).
- The 2014 Bahamas Bowl involved a 45-yard Hail Mary pass from QB Cooper Rush to receiver Jesse Kroll with one second remaining. As Kroll was being tackled, he lateraled the ball to teammate Deon Butler, who darted 20 yards before lateraling to Courtney Williams. With no room to run, Williams executed a third lateral pass to star receiver Titus Davis, who ran the final 13 yards and dove towards the pylon, scoring a touchdown.
- The Arkansas Razorbacks successfully executed the play on fourth and 25 in overtime in a 2015 meeting against Ole Miss. Known as the "Hog & Lateral", quarterback Brandon Allen completed a pass to Hunter Henry, who appeared that he was going to be tackled yards short of the first down marker, flung the ball backwards towards running back Alex Collins. Collins scooped the ball up on the bounce at the line of scrimmage and ran it 31 yards to gain a first down. Though Collins fumbled it at the end of the play, it was recovered by teammate Dominique Reed. Head coach Bret Bielema called the play "divine intervention". The Razorbacks scored a touchdown plays later and went on to upset the Rebels on a winning two-point conversion on a quarterback keeper by Allen.
- The Miami Dolphins used a hook and lateral with two laterals to score a touchdown and defeat the New England Patriots on the last play during a game at Hard Rock Stadium in 2018. Down by five points, and with only seven seconds remaining, Dolphins QB Ryan Tannehill completed a pass to wide receiver Kenny Stills, who lateraled to fellow wide receiver DeVante Parker, who in turn lateraled to running back Kenyan Drake who completed the scoring play with no time left in regulation. The play has been dubbed the Miracle in Miami.
- On December 1, 2024, during a Sunday night game against the San Francisco 49ers, the Buffalo Bills executed an improvised hook-and-lateral, when quarterback Josh Allen threw the ball to wide receiver Amari Cooper, who upon being surrounded by 49ers defenders, pitched the ball back to Allen, who had followed the play to position himself behind Cooper and ran the ball into the end zone. The sequence of events led to Allen being awarded a passing touchdown and a receiving touchdown on the same play, which combined with a scrambling touchdown elsewhere in the game gave Allen the distinction of being the first quarterback, and only the twelfth person, to score rushing, passing and receiving touchdowns in the same game (the others had done so as running backs who successfully executed halfback option plays).
- It has appeared in the season one finale of Friday Night Lights during the final play of the state championship between Dillon and West Cambria.

=== Speculation on origins of names ===
Some proponents of the term "hook and lateral" claim that the "hook" refers to the pattern run by the receiver who catches the pass from the quarterback. The "lateral" refers to the pitching of the ball by the receiver to his teammate. This is not synonymous with a "ladder", which is a specific route (also called a "chair") where a receiver cuts out before turning up the field along the sideline. If the "hook" receiver laterals the ball to a teammate running a ladder route, the play could accurately be described as a "hook and ladder". This would not be true of many hook and lateral plays. In the case of the play run by the Boise State Broncos in the 2007 Fiesta Bowl, the player who received the lateral from the "hook" receiver was running a slant route across the center of the field rather than a ladder route. The NFL's winningest all-time head coach who successfully ran the play, Don Shula, has stated that it is a "hook-and-lateral play because the receiver laterals the ball; there is no ladder."

On the January 2, 2007, broadcast of ESPN's Around the Horn, sportswriter Woody Paige claimed, perhaps facetiously, that the name "hook and ladder" originated with NYC Firemen Football Team in Hell's Kitchen, New York. This was in response to the other panelists ridiculing his use of "hook and ladder" rather than "hook and lateral". The next day, Jay Mariotti claimed the phrase "hook and ladder" referred to coal mining in Pennsylvania in the 1930s. His research claims that coal miners need a hook and ladder when trapped in a mine. Another possible explanation is that "hook and ladder" is just a corruption of the phrase "hook and lateral".

A "hook and ladder" is a common name for a firetruck, which used to carry various hooks and ladders. The analogies that could be drawn to this play based on a "hook" route (with or without an actual "lateral") and a "hook and ladder" apparatus are numerous. Long extension ladders include two or more pieces, perhaps the first piece being a "hook" route, and the second piece being a run up the "ladder" to the end-zone. The second part of the play is sometimes accomplished with a hand-off, and not a lateral at all. Notwithstanding, there does not seem to be any definitive proof of what the play was originally called or why.
