= Michaela Franklin =

American volleyball coach (born 1982)

Personal information
- Nationality: American
- Born: September 28, 1982 (age 44); Miami, Florida, U.S.
- Hometown: Lincoln, Nebraska
- Education: Kansas State University

Coaching information
- Current team: USF (Associate head coach)

Michaela Franklin (born September 28, 1982) is an American collegiate volleyball coach and former player.

Most recently, Franklin served as the head coach at Clemson University from 2017 to 2021. Prior to her tenure at Clemson, Franklin was associate head coach of women's volleyball at Iowa University from 2014 to 2017. She was assistant volleyball coach at Northern Illinois University from 2006 to 2008 and at Marquette University from 2009 to 2012. Franklin graduate from Kansas State University, where she played college volleyball from 2002 to 2004. She is the daughter of Andra Franklin.
