= Jimmy Cefalo =

American football player (born 1956)

No. 81
- Position: Wide receiver

Personal information
- Born: October 6, 1956 (age 70); Pittston, Pennsylvania, U.S.
- Listed height: 5 ft 11 in (1.80 m)
- Listed weight: 190 lb (86 kg)

Career information
- High school: Pittston Area Senior
- College: Penn State
- NFL draft: 1978: 3rd round, 81st overall pick

Career history
- Miami Dolphins (1978–1984)

Awards and highlights
- Second-team All-East (1977)

Career NFL statistics
- Receptions: 93
- Receiving yards: 1,739
- Receiving touchdowns: 13
- Stats at Pro Football Reference

James Cameron Cefalo (born October 6, 1956) is an American journalist, news broadcaster and sports broadcaster, radio talk show host, Voice of the Miami Dolphins, businessman, wine enthusiast and former professional football wide receiver and game show host.

== Early life ==
Cefalo attended Pittston Area High School in Pittston, Pennsylvania. It was his performance there that led to his inclusion on The Pennsylvania Football News All-Century Team.

Listed at 6-foot-1, 185 pounds during his senior year for head coach Bob Barbieri's Patriots, Cefalo was one of the nation's most highly recruited running backs.

Cefalo is one of 50-plus people on Pittston's Inspiration Mural, which celebrates prominent figures in the Pittston community and is Pennsylvania's third-largest mural. Cefalo returned to Pittston Area for a football game as recently as September 2015.

== College career ==
Cefalo was a standout at Penn State University from 1974 to 1977. He led the Nittany Lions in all-purpose yards his senior season. He was instrumental in Penn State's 41–20 victory over Baylor in the 1975 Cotton Bowl Classic. He was named most valuable player of the 1976 Gator Bowl.

He earned a Bachelor of Arts in journalism in 1978.

== Professional career ==
Cefalo was a third round draft choice (#81 overall) of the Miami Dolphins in the 1978 NFL draft. He would play six seasons for the Dolphins, including Super Bowls (XVII and XIX), earning a reputation as a sure-handed, dependable receiver. In Super Bowl XVII, Cefalo replaced receiver Nat Moore out as the result of an ankle injury. He proved to be one of Miami's few bright spots in a 27–17 loss to the Washington Redskins. He caught the team's only offensive touchdown and averaged 41 yards per catch. Cefalo's 76-yard touchdown reception from quarterback David Woodley still ranks as the fifth-longest in Super Bowl history.

In 1984, Cefalo caught the Dan Marino pass that broke the record for most touchdown passes in a season. The play in itself was unique, as the ball landed in Cefalo's facemask.

He played in one of the most famous games in NFL history: the AFC divisional playoff game between the San Diego Chargers and Miami Dolphins on January 2, 1982, at the Orange Bowl. The Pro Football Hall of Fame named it the "NFL's Game of the '80s."

== Post-playing career ==
=== NBC ===
Cefalo was a color commentator for NFL on NBC, partnering with Charlie Jones from 1985-1988, and Jim Donovan in 1989.

He has also been a correspondent for NBC News on The Today Show, sports anchor for NBC News at Sunrise and co-host of the 1988 Summer Olympics in Seoul, South Korea.

Cefalo hosted NBC's pregame coverage for Game 4 of the 1987 National League Championship Series, as Marv Albert was away on a boxing assignment for NBC. Cefalo also hosted NBC's pregame show for Game 4 of the 1989 American League Championship Series as Marv Albert was away on an NFL assignment for NBC.

=== Radio and television ===
Cefalo is currently the play-by-play man and "Voice of the Miami Dolphins" radio broadcast team and the former host of South Florida's First News Program for WIOD. In March 2012, Cefalo's International launched their new food, wine, and travel radio show called - Cefalo's - Eat This Drink That Go!, which also aired on Clear Channel Communications at WIOD 610 AM and 100.3 FM in South Florida as well as nationally streamed on www.WIOD.com and IHeartRadio. He also does regular sports analysis for the NFL Network and WIOD's sister station WINZ, the Sports Animal, which also carries the Miami Dolphins broadcast.

In 1988, Cefalo won an Emmy for his writing on the 24th Olympic Games. The National Sportscasters and Sportswriters Association named him Florida Sportscaster of the Year five times (1998, 2001–2004).

Cefalo co-hosted PM Magazine and AM South Florida. In 1990, he received the hosting duties for Trump Card, (beating out Richard Dawson), a game show filmed in Atlantic City at Trump Castle. Three years later, Cefalo was signed to host Sports Snapshot, a game show that merged home shopping with sports trivia.

Cefalo became the play-by-play man on the Miami Dolphins radio broadcast team on Dolphins flagship station WQAM in 2005. He was partnered with former Dolphins Joe Rose and the late Jim "Mad Dog" Mandich. He later worked with Rose and Bob Griese

For thirteen years, Cefalo was the Sports Director at WPLG-TV in Miami. In addition to his sports anchor duties, he created and hosted WPLG's Sports Jam Live program.

== Personal life ==
He currently resides in Miami Beach, Florida, with his wife Janice. The couple have three daughters: Mia, and twins Ava and Katie.

Cefalo is a well-known oenophile, with over 1,200 bottles in his personal wine cellar. His family has been in the wine business for several generations. The Cefalo family has been involved in the making and selling of wine for the past 150 years. Cefalo's great-grandfather was a wine maker and inn keeper in Central Italy. His grandfather Michael Cefalo immigrated to the US in 1908 and became a coal miner, land owner, and wine maker in Northeastern Pennsylvania. One of his 7 sons, Charlie, continued the tradition with a bonded Pennsylvania winery producing Italian varietals until his passing.

Cefalo's Wine Cellar began in 2002 with a 3400-square foot retail/liquor store located in South Miami. The store specialized in hard-to-find, highly allocated wines. In 2005, Jimmy Cefalo and Brenda Bassett formed their company, Cefalo's International, which continues to grow with the launch of their new food wine and travel show, Cefalo's - Eat This Drink That Go!, as well as serving as the Wine Ambassador for Martini & Rossi, owned by Bacardi.

Until it closed in October 2008, Cefalo's Wine Cellar was a 7,000-square foot facility that included several components - a historic bar (The Taurus, built in 1911), a retail wine store (Cefalo's Wine Cellar) with tasting room and a private membership wine cave serving 99 members, with their private lockers (Cefalo's Cave Club). For Cefalo's Cave Club, a ridge was found under the aquifer where 36 feet was dug to create a two-story wine cave.

In 2007, Cefalo received an Honorary Doctor of Business Administration in Food and Beverage Management from Johnson & Wales University.

In 2008, Jimmy Cefalo and Cefalo's International became the Wine Ambassador for Martini & Rossi, the wine/vermouth portfolio for Bacardi. In March 2012, Jimmy Cefalo and Brenda Bassett launched Cefalo's - Eat This Drink That Go!, a radio show dedicated to food, wine and travel on Clear Channel's WIOD-AM, covering South Florida from Palm Beach down to the Florida Keys, and also streamed nationally through IHeartRadio and their websites, www.WIOD.com and www.EatThisDrinkThatGo.com and www.JimmyCefalo.com.

== NFL career statistics ==
Legend
**Bold**	Career high

=== Regular season ===
Year	Team	Games		Receiving				
Year	Team	GP	GS	Rec	Yds	Avg	Lng	TD
1978	MIA	**16**	1	6	145	**24.2**	43	**3**
1979	MIA	**16**	3	12	223	18.6	30	**3**
1980	MIA	**16**	4	11	199	18.1	52	1
1981	MIA	**16**	6	**29**	**631**	21.8	**69**	**3**
1982	MIA	9	**9**	17	356	20.9	46	1
1983	MIA	1	1	0	0	0.0	0	0
1984	MIA	**16**	0	18	185	10.3	25	2
		90	24	93	1,739	18.7	69	13

=== Playoffs ===
Year	Team	Games		Receiving				
Year	Team	GP	GS	Rec	Yds	Avg	Lng	TD
1978	MIA	1	0	0	0	0.0	0	0
1979	MIA	1	0	0	0	0.0	0	0
1981	MIA	1	1	3	62	20.7	23	0
1982	MIA	**4**	**4**	**6**	**178**	**29.7**	**76**	**1**
1984	MIA	3	0	3	57	19.0	34	**1**
		10	5	12	297	24.8	76	2
