= Tony Nathan =

American football player (born 1956)

No. 22
- Position: Running back

Personal information
- Born: December 14, 1956 (age 69); Birmingham, Alabama, U.S.
- Listed height: 6 ft 0 in (1.83 m)
- Listed weight: 206 lb (93 kg)

Career information
- High school: Woodlawn (Birmingham)
- College: Alabama
- NFL draft: 1979: 3rd round, 61st overall pick

Career history
- Miami Dolphins (1979–1987)

Awards and highlights
- First-team All-Pro (1979); Dolphins Walk of Fame (2014); National champion (1978); 2× Second-team All-SEC (1977, 1978)

Career NFL statistics
- Rushing yards: 3,543
- Rushing average: 4.8
- Rushing touchdowns: 16
- Stats at Pro Football Reference

Tony Curtis Nathan (born December 14, 1956) is an American former professional football player who was a running back for the Miami Dolphins of the National Football League (NFL). He played college football for the Alabama Crimson Tide and was selected by the Dolphins in the third round of the 1979 NFL draft. Nathan played with Miami from 1979 to 1987.

== Early life ==
During high school, Tony Nathan became one of the first black football players at Woodlawn High School in Birmingham, Alabama. The story of his high school career was made into a Pure Flix Entertainment film known as Woodlawn. It was released on October 16, 2015.

== College career ==
In his four seasons with the Alabama Crimson Tide from 1975 to 1978, Nathan rushed for 1,997 yards, with 29 touchdowns and a 6.4 yards per carry average. Also excelling as a kick returner, he finished his college career with 30 touchdowns and 3,362 all-purpose yards, including a 10.9 average in yards per punt return.

== Professional career ==
Nathan was the Dolphins' starting running back in Super Bowl XVII and Super Bowl XIX. He had a superb performance in Super Bowl XIX, with 18 yards rushing and 10 receptions for 83 yards. His ten receptions were the second most in Super Bowl history at the time. He was also instrumental in the Dolphins' 45–28 win over the Pittsburgh Steelers in the 1985 AFC Championship game, in which he rushed for 64 yards and a touchdown, and caught eight receptions for 114 yards. He also had a key performance in the 1981 AFC Divisional playoff game against the San Diego Chargers that became known as "The Epic In Miami". Nathan gained 169 total yards and scored two touchdowns in the Dolphins' narrow loss, including a score on the famous "hook and lateral" play in which he caught a toss from receiver Duriel Harris.

He finished his nine NFL seasons with 3,543 yards rushing, 383 receptions for 3,592 yards, and 32 touchdowns (16 each rushing and receiving). He also completed four of eight passes for 61 yards and a touchdown. He retired from playing in 1988, and became an assistant to Don Shula. He became the Dolphins' running backs coach in 1993. He served under Tony Dungy as the running backs coach for the Tampa Bay Buccaneers from 1996 to 2001. The Bucs ranked 22nd in the NFL in rushing offense in his first year, but rose steadily to 11th and then 4th in the next two seasons. The Bucs fell to 30th in the league in rushing in 2001, and he was replaced by incoming head coach Jon Gruden.

From 2003 to 2005, Nathan was the running backs coach at Florida International University, under head coach and former Dolphins teammate Don Strock.

Nathan was inducted into the Senior Bowl Hall of Fame in 2006, along with Curtis Martin and Michael Strahan. Additionally, he returned to the NFL coaching ranks as the Baltimore Ravens' running backs coach. On February 4, 2008, Nathan was hired as the San Francisco 49ers' running backs coach, making him the 24th former Raven to join the 49ers since Mike Nolan became the head coach. Nathan was fired by the 49ers on December 30, 2008.

== NFL career statistics ==
Legend
	Led the league
**Bold**	Career high

=== Regular season ===
Year	Team	Games		Rushing					Receiving				
Year	Team	GP	GS	Att	Yds	Avg	Lng	TD	Rec	Yds	Avg	Lng	TD
1979	MIA	**16**	0	16	68	4.3	18	0	17	213	**12.5**	35	2
1980	MIA	**16**	6	60	327	5.5	18	1	57	588	10.3	61	**5**
1981	MIA	13	11	147	**782**	5.3	**46**	**5**	50	452	9.0	31	3
1982	MIA	8	7	66	233	3.5	15	1	16	114	7.1	16	0
1983	MIA	**16**	12	**151**	685	4.5	40	3	52	461	8.9	25	1
1984	MIA	**16**	12	118	558	4.7	22	1	61	579	9.5	26	2
1985	MIA	**16**	**15**	143	667	4.7	22	**5**	**72**	**651**	9.0	**73**	1
1986	MIA	**16**	0	27	203	**7.5**	20	0	48	457	9.5	23	2
1987	MIA	6	0	4	20	5.0	8	0	10	77	7.7	14	0
		123	63	732	3,543	4.8	46	16	383	3,592	9.4	73	16

=== Playoffs ===
Year	Team	Games		Rushing					Receiving				
Year	Team	GP	GS	Att	Yds	Avg	Lng	TD	Rec	Yds	Avg	Lng	TD
1979	MIA	1	0	0	0	0.0	0	0	3	27	9.0	14	0
1981	MIA	1	0	14	48	3.4	12	1	9	114	**12.7**	27	**1**
1982	MIA	**4**	2	**45**	**204**	**4.5**	**16**	0	15	127	8.5	26	0
1983	MIA	1	0	8	19	2.4	9	0	1	6	6.0	6	0
1984	MIA	3	**3**	42	158	3.8	**16**	**2**	**22**	**217**	9.9	30	0
1985	MIA	2	2	9	25	2.8	12	0	15	158	10.5	**39**	**1**
		12	7	118	454	3.8	16	3	65	649	10.0	39	2

== Personal life ==
He is currently the Bailiff for long-time Miami Dolphins attorney, Judge Marcus Bach Armas, who replaced Nathan's teammate, Judge Edward Newman, on the Miami-Dade County court.

Fulfilling a promise he made to Bear Bryant in 1979, Nathan returned to finish his degree at Alabama in 2015. Also in 2015, Touchdown Tony: Running with a Purpose which was written by Nathan was published as a tie-in with the release of the movie Woodlawn which depicted his time at Woodlawn High School.
