= Woody Bennett =

American football player (born 1955)

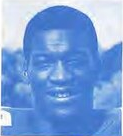
- Bennett in 1976

No. 46, 34
- Position: Fullback

Personal information
- Born: March 24, 1955 (age 71); York, Pennsylvania, U.S.
- Listed height: 6 ft 2 in (1.88 m)
- Listed weight: 227 lb (103 kg)

Career information
- College: Miami (FL)
- NFL draft: 1979: undrafted

Career history
- New York Jets (1979–1980); Miami Dolphins (1980–1988)

Career NFL statistics
- Rushing yards: 1,761
- Rushing average: 4.2
- Rushing touchdowns: 10
- Stats at Pro Football Reference

Woodrow Bennett Jr. (born March 24, 1955) is an American former professional football player who was a fullback for 10 seasons with the New York Jets and Miami Dolphins of the National Football League (NFL).

Bennett played college football for the Miami Hurricanes before being signed by the Jets. Cut by the Jets in 1980, he was claimed off waivers by the Dolphins and went on to start 62 games over nine seasons.

Following his football career, Bennett became a pastor at a church in Tamarac, Florida.

== NFL career statistics ==
Legend
| **Bold** | Career high |

=== Regular season ===
| Year | Team | Games | | Rushing | | | | | Receiving | | | | |
| Year | Team | GP | GS | Att | Yds | Avg | Lng | TD | Rec | Yds | Avg | Lng | TD |
|---|---|---|---|---|---|---|---|---|---|---|---|---|---|
| 1979 | NYJ | 15 | 0 | 2 | 4 | 2.0 | 3 | 1 | 1 | 9 | 9.0 | 9 | 0 |
| 1980 | NYJ | 10 | 0 | 3 | 13 | 4.3 | 6 | 0 | 0 | 0 | 0.0 | 0 | 0 |
| 1980 | MIA | 4 | 3 | 43 | 187 | 4.3 | 19 | 0 | 3 | 26 | 8.7 | 19 | **1** |
| 1981 | MIA | 3 | 3 | 28 | 104 | 3.7 | 12 | 0 | 4 | 22 | 5.5 | 10 | 0 |
| 1982 | MIA | 1 | 0 | 9 | 15 | 1.7 | 5 | 0 | 0 | 0 | 0.0 | 0 | 0 |
| 1983 | MIA | **16** | 2 | 49 | 197 | 4.0 | **25** | 2 | 6 | 35 | 5.8 | 9 | 0 |
| 1984 | MIA | **16** | 9 | **144** | **606** | 4.2 | 23 | **7** | 6 | 44 | 7.3 | 20 | **1** |
| 1985 | MIA | **16** | 13 | 54 | 256 | **4.7** | 17 | 0 | **10** | **101** | **10.1** | **27** | **1** |
| 1986 | MIA | **16** | **14** | 36 | 162 | 4.5 | 16 | 0 | 4 | 33 | 8.3 | 13 | 0 |
| 1987 | MIA | 12 | 11 | 25 | 102 | 4.1 | 18 | 0 | 4 | 18 | 4.5 | 6 | 0 |
| 1988 | MIA | **16** | 7 | 31 | 115 | 3.7 | 12 | 0 | 2 | 16 | 8.0 | 12 | 0 |
| | | 125 | 62 | 424 | 1,761 | 4.2 | 25 | 10 | 40 | 304 | 7.6 | 27 | 3 |

=== Playoffs ===
| Year | Team | Games | | Rushing | | | | | Receiving | | | | |
| Year | Team | GP | GS | Att | Yds | Avg | Lng | TD | Rec | Yds | Avg | Lng | TD |
|---|---|---|---|---|---|---|---|---|---|---|---|---|---|
| 1982 | MIA | **4** | 0 | **25** | 48 | 1.9 | 12 | **2** | 0 | 0 | 0.0 | 0 | 0 |
| 1983 | MIA | 1 | 0 | 7 | 31 | **4.4** | 8 | 1 | 0 | 0 | 0.0 | 0 | 0 |
| 1984 | MIA | 3 | **3** | 22 | **81** | 3.7 | **17** | 1 | **1** | **20** | **20.0** | **20** | 0 |
| 1985 | MIA | 2 | 1 | 5 | 19 | 3.8 | **17** | 0 | **1** | 6 | 6.0 | 6 | 0 |
| | | 10 | 4 | 59 | 179 | 3.0 | 17 | 4 | 2 | 26 | 13.0 | 20 | 0 |
