= Tommy Vigorito =

American football player (1959–2025)

No. 32
- Positions: Running back, punt returner

Personal information
- Born: October 23, 1959; Passaic, New Jersey, U.S.
- Died: May 13, 2025 (aged 65)
- Listed height: 5 ft 10 in (1.78 m)
- Listed weight: 193 lb (88 kg)

Career information
- High school: DePaul Catholic (Wayne, New Jersey)
- College: Virginia
- NFL draft: 1981: 5th round, 138th overall pick

Career history
- Miami Dolphins (1981–1985)

Awards and highlights
- First-team All-ACC (1979)

Career NFL statistics
- Receptions: 59
- Receiving yards: 439
- Receiving touchdowns: 6
- Return yards: 914
- Return touchdowns: 2
- Stats at Pro Football Reference

Thomas J. Vigorito (October 23, 1959 – May 13, 2025) was an American professional football player. He was a running back and punt returner in the National Football League (NFL) for the Miami Dolphins (1981–1983, 1985). He played college football for the Virginia Cavaliers from 1977 to 1980.

== Early life ==
Vigorito was born in Passaic, New Jersey on October 23, 1959. He attended DePaul Catholic High School in Wayne, New Jersey, where he lettered in football, track, and baseball. Vigorito helped the football team win the 1975 state championship. He was a Parade high school All-American, receiving scholarship offers from Notre Dame, Boston College, Duke, Purdue, Penn State, and Virginia.

== College career ==
Vigorito attended the University of Virginia, playing college football for the Cavaliers from 1977 to 1980. He was an offensive force, leading the team in all-purpose yards in 1977, 1978, and 1980; rushing in 1978, 1979, and 1980 (including 1,045 yards in 1979); kickoff returns in 1977; and receptions in 1980. His 81-yard run against North Carolina State in 1979 is, as of 2024, the third-longest run in Virginia football history. That season, Vigorito was named to the All-ACC first team. He finished his career as Virginia's No. 2 rusher with 2,912 rushing yards (as of the end of the 2024 season he ranks 7th overall). Vigorito was chosen to play in the 1981 East-West Shrine Football Classic.

== Professional football ==
Vigorito was selected by the Miami Dolphins in the fifth round of the 1981 NFL draft with the 138th overall pick. He nearly signed with the Montreal Alouettes of the Canadian Football League, who offered him more money, but he opted to play for Miami's legendary coach Don Shula.

As a rookie in 1981, he was the Dolphins' No. 3 halfback behind Tony Nathan and Eddie Hill. He won the Tommy Fitzgerald Award as the Dolphins' outstanding rookie in training camp. He appeared in 16 games as a rookie, tallying 33 receptions for 237 yards and 116 rushing yads on 35 carries for a 3.3 yard average. He also gained 379 yards on 36 punt returns, an average of 10.5 yards per return, and set a then-Dolphins record with an 87-yard return on a nationally-televised Thursday night game against the Pittsburgh Steelers. Vigorito was named the Dolphins Outstanding Special Teams Player for the 1981 season.

In the strike-shortened 1982 season, Vigorito appeared in all nine Miami games, including one as a starter, tallying 24 receptions for 186 yards and 99 rushing yards on 19 carries. He also gained 192 yards on 20 punt returns, including a 59-yard touchdown return in the season opener against the rival New York Jets.

Vigorito tore his anterior cruciate ligament (ACL) in his right knee on a 62-yard punt return in the 1983 season opener and missed the rest of the season and the entire 1984 season. In that era, recovery from ACL injuries was not always successful. He returned to the Dolphins in 1985 and was used primarily as a punt returner, tallying 197 yards on 22 returns.

== Death ==
Vigorito died on May 13, 2025, at the age of 65.
