= Tom Tutson =

American football player (born 1958)

No. 43
- Position: Defensive back

Personal information
- Born: May 20, 1958 (age 68); Jacksonville, Florida, U.S.
- Listed height: 6 ft 1 in (1.85 m)
- Listed weight: 180 lb (82 kg)

Career information
- High school: Jean Ribault (Jacksonville)
- College: South Carolina State
- NFL draft: 1982: 6th round, 161st overall pick

Career history
- Miami Dolphins (1982); Atlanta Falcons (1983)

Career NFL statistics
- Games played: 10
- Stats at Pro Football Reference

Thomas Tutson (born May 20, 1958) is an American former professional football player who was a defensive back for the Atlanta Falcons of the National Football League (NFL) in 1983. He played college football for the South Carolina State Bulldogs.
