= Mark Duper =

American football player (born 1959)

No. 85
- Position: Wide receiver

Personal information
- Born: January 25, 1959 (age 67); Pineville, Louisiana, U.S.
- Listed height: 5 ft 9 in (1.75 m)
- Listed weight: 185 lb (84 kg)

Career information
- High school: Moreauville (Moreauville, Louisiana)
- College: Northwestern State (1980–1981)
- NFL draft: 1982: 2nd round, 52nd overall pick

Career history
- Miami Dolphins (1982–1992); Miami Hooters (1994)

Awards and highlights
- Second-team All-Pro (1983); 3× Pro Bowl (1983, 1984, 1986); Miami Dolphins Honor Roll

Career NFL statistics
- Receptions: 511
- Receiving yards: 8,869
- Receiving touchdowns: 59
- Stats at Pro Football Reference

Mark "Super" Duper (born January 25, 1959) is an American former professional football player who was a wide receiver for the Miami Dolphins of the National Football League (NFL) from 1982 to 1992. He played college football for the Northwestern State Demons and was selected by the Dolphins in the second round of the 1982 NFL draft. A three-time Pro Bowl selection, he was named a second-team All-Pro in 1983.

== Professional career ==
Nicknamed "Super Duper", he played 11 seasons for the Dolphins where his best years came while teamed with Pro Football Hall of Fame quarterback Dan Marino and fellow wide receiver Mark Clayton, the other half of the "Marks Brothers" wide receiver tandem. Duper, who wore #85, was a 3-time Pro Bowl selection in 1983, 1984 and 1986. His best season was 1984, when he had 71 catches, 1306 yards and 8 touchdowns, and in 1986, when he tallied 67 catches, 1313 yards and 11 touchdowns. Duper had four 1,000-yard seasons, with the final one coming in 1991 at age 32, when he posted 1085 yards. In 1990, Duper became only the second Dolphins player to surpass 7,000 career receiving yards. On July 17, 1993, the Dolphins released Duper, after re-hauling their receiving corps bringing in O.J. McDuffie, Irving Fryar, and Mark Ingram Sr., and letting go of the Marks Brothers.

Duper was also a track star, he won in the finals of the 400-meter relay at the 1981 NCAA track and field championships at Northwestern State University, and from the 1980 Olympic trials finished seventh in the 200-meter dash and reached the semifinals of the 100. He competed in the 100 meters and 200 meters, posting personal bests of 10.21 seconds and 20.77 seconds, respectively.

In 11 NFL seasons, he caught 511 passes for 8,869 yards and 59 touchdowns. In 1994, he also appeared in two games with the Miami Hooters of the Arena Football League.

On November 8, 2013, Duper revealed he had been diagnosed with chronic traumatic encephalopathy (CTE).

Duper was inducted (with Mark Clayton) into the Miami Dolphins Honor Roll on December 15, 2003.

== NFL career statistics ==
Legend
| | Led the league |
| **Bold** | Career high |

=== Regular season ===
| Year | Team | GP | Receiving | | | | |
| Year | Team | GP | Rec | Yds | Avg | Lng | TD |
|---|---|---|---|---|---|---|---|
| 1982 | MIA | 2 | 0 | 0 | 0 | 0 | 0 |
| 1983 | MIA | **16** | 51 | 1,003 | **19.7** | **85** | 10 |
| 1984 | MIA | **16** | **71** | 1,306 | 18.4 | 80 | 8 |
| 1985 | MIA | 9 | 35 | 650 | 18.6 | 67 | 3 |
| 1986 | MIA | **16** | 67 | **1,313** | 19.6 | **85** | **11** |
| 1987 | MIA | 11 | 33 | 597 | 18.1 | 59 | 8 |
| 1988 | MIA | 13 | 39 | 626 | 16.1 | 56 | 1 |
| 1989 | MIA | 15 | 49 | 717 | 14.6 | 41 | 1 |
| 1990 | MIA | **16** | 52 | 810 | 15.6 | 69 | 5 |
| 1991 | MIA | **16** | 70 | 1,085 | 15.5 | 43 | 5 |
| 1992 | MIA | **16** | 44 | 762 | 17.3 | 62 | 7 |
| Career | | 146 | 511 | 8,869 | 17.4 | 85 | 59 |

== See also ==
- Living former players diagnosed with or reporting symptoms of chronic traumatic encephalopathy
