= John Smith (placekicker) =

English-American gridiron football player (born 1949)

No. 1
- Position: Placekicker

Personal information
- Born: 30 December 1949 (age 76); Leafield, Oxfordshire, England
- Listed height: 6 ft 0 in (1.83 m)
- Listed weight: 186 lb (84 kg)

Career information
- College: Southampton
- NFL draft: 1974: undrafted

Career history
- New England Colonials (1973); New England Patriots (1974–1983)

Awards and highlights
- Pro Bowl (1980); 2× NFL scoring leader (1979, 1980); New England Patriots All-1970s Team

Career NFL statistics
- Field goals: 128/191
- Field goal %: 67%
- Longest field goal: 50
- Points scored: 692
- Stats at Pro Football Reference

John Michael Smith (born 30 December 1949) is an English-American former American football player who was a placekicker for the New England Patriots of the National Football League (NFL). He debuted with the Patriots in 1974, remaining with the team until 1983.

== Early years ==
John Smith trained as a teacher at King Alfred's College, Winchester in England, between 1968 and 1971. After teaching for a year, he moved to the United States. He had not played American football before but was an outstanding all-round sportsman and superb soccer player so he approached the New England Patriots and asked for a trial as a placekicker. New England saw the left-footed kicker's potential and he was sent to spend his 1973 season in the Atlantic Coast Football League before re-signing with the Patriots in 1974.

== Notable games ==
The first NFL game that Smith ever saw was also the first game he appeared in, the 1973 Hall of Fame Game versus the San Francisco 49ers. He recalled that the first time he lined up to kick off, he heard a 49ers linebacker screaming all sorts of obscenities towards him and his mother. He kicked poorly in the game and was cut, but was assigned to the Patriots' farm club, the New England Colonials of the ACFL, who played their games at the Patriots' Foxboro Stadium. Smith wound up leading the Colonials in scoring with 61 points (on ten field goals and 31 extra points) and kicked two field goals and five extra points as the Colonials routed the Bridgeport Jets, 41-17, in the ACFL championship game. The ACFL folded after the season, but Smith was "called up" to the Patriots, with whom he would spend nine seasons.

On 8 December 1980 the Patriots were playing the Miami Dolphins in a nationally televised Monday Night Football game with a playoff spot on the line. The game was tied 13-13 in the final seconds of regulation with the camera panned in on Smith when Howard Cosell broke the news to the nation that John Lennon had been murdered. Smith had made two field goals during the game but the kick was blocked and the Dolphins won in overtime. After the game there was little talk of football as the media had been swept up in the story of Lennon. Smith was one of only two English NFL players at the time, the other being Mike Dawson. Smith was a fan of the Beatles in his youth and during his rookie hazing with the Patriots often sang Beatles songs to his teammates.

Smith kicked the only points in the Snowplow Game, played 12 December 1982 in a snow storm at Schaefer Stadium. Convict Mark Henderson, released for a weekend work program, cleared the way with his snowplow for Smith to beat the Miami Dolphins and enter football lore in one of the most memorable games in Patriots history.

Smith led the NFL in scoring in 1979 and 1980. In 1982, Smith injured his right knee (on his non-kicking leg) and underwent arthroscopic surgery; he retired after the 1983 season as the second-highest scoring player in Patriots history, behind Gino Cappelletti.

== Post-retirement ==
Smith ran The John Smith Sports Center, an indoor sports complex in Milford, Massachusetts, until June 2020. Smith runs JSSA Magic (John Smith Soccer Academy), a premier soccer club for ages 8–18. He also runs John Smith's No. 1 Soccer School, a soccer camp held at various New England schools and colleges each summer.

== Personal life ==
Smith currently lives in Dover, Massachusetts, with his wife Vivienne. Smith has four children, and his oldest daughter, Felicity Smith-Day, directs John Smith Soccer. She is a former college All-American. She also played professionally for Arsenal L.F.C.
