= Ron Hester =

American football player (born 1959)

No. 53
- Position: Linebacker

Personal information
- Born: May 26, 1959 (age 67); Atlanta, Georgia, U.S.
- Listed height: 6 ft 2 in (1.88 m)
- Listed weight: 222 lb (101 kg)

Career information
- High school: Umatilla (FL)
- College: Florida State
- NFL draft: 1982: 6th round, 164th overall pick

Career history
- Miami Dolphins (1982)

Career NFL statistics
- Sacks: 1
- Fumble recoveries: 1
- Stats at Pro Football Reference

Ronald J. Hester (born May 26, 1959) is an American former professional football player who was a linebacker for the Miami Dolphins of the National Football League (NFL) in 1982. He played college football for the Florida State Seminoles.
