= Steve Clark (American football, born 1960) =

American football player

No. 76
- Positions: Guard, nose tackle

Personal information
- Born: August 2, 1960 (age 66); Salt Lake City, Utah, U.S.
- Listed height: 6 ft 4 in (1.93 m)
- Listed weight: 255 lb (116 kg)

Career information
- High school: Skyline (Millcreek, Utah)
- College: Utah
- NFL draft: 1982: 9th round, 239th overall pick

Career history
- Miami Dolphins (1982–1985)

Awards and highlights
- First-team All-American (1981); WAC Defensive Player of the Year (1981); First-team All-WAC (1981)

Career NFL statistics
- Games played: 41
- Games started: 5
- Fumble recoveries: 2
- Stats at Pro Football Reference

Stephen Spence Clark (born August 2, 1960) is an American former professional football player who was a defensive tackle and offensive guard for five seasons with the Miami Dolphins of the National Football League (NFL). He played college football for the Utah Utes.

== Biography ==
Clark played on two state championship teams in high school at Skyline High School in Salt Lake City, which were a combined 25–1 over two years and was a five team all-American including Parade magazine. He was also named Most Valuable Player of the state of Utah. He went on to play college football for the Utah Utes of the University of Utah. There, he was named two-time All-Western Athletic Conference (WAC) defensive tackle, Defensive Most Valuable Player of the WAC, and First-team All-American. He also played in the East-West Shrine Game and was named co-MVP of the 1982 Senior Bowl.

In the 1982 NFL draft, Clark was select by Don Shula and the Miami Dolphins in the ninth round. During Clark's second year in the NFL, he played both ways (offense and defense) in a preseason game, and Coach Shula knew he had a player that could back up every position on the offensive and defensive line as well as long snap. He earned a starting position at right guard and played against William Perry when the Dolphins beat the Chicago Bears on Monday Night Football to help keep the 1972 Dolphins as the only team with a perfect season in NFL history. Clark also played on two Super Bowl teams with the Dolphins and was the starting right guard before being injured. Clark was named one of the top 100 greatest players in the history of the University of Utah, placing ninth on the list.
