= Tom Orosz =

American football player (born 1959)

No. 3, 19
- Position: Punter

Personal information
- Born: September 26, 1959 (age 67); Painesville, Ohio, U.S.
- Listed height: 6 ft 1 in (1.85 m)
- Listed weight: 204 lb (93 kg)

Career information
- High school: Harding High School
- College: Ohio State
- NFL draft: 1981

Career history
- (1981–1982): Miami Dolphins
- (1983–1984): San Francisco 49ers

Awards and highlights
- Super Bowl champion (XIX); PFWA All-Rookie Team (1981); First-team All-Big Ten (1978); Second-team All-Big Ten (1980)

Career NFL statistics
- Punting yards: 7,486
- Punts: 188
- Games played: 43
- Punt blocks: 1
- Rushing yards: 52
- Stats at Pro Football Reference

Tom Orosz (born September 26, 1959) is an American former professional football player who was a punter in the National Football League (NFL). He played in the NFL for the Miami Dolphins from 1981 to 1982 and for the San Francisco 49ers from 1983 to 1984. He was an All-American at Ohio State.
