= Rusty Chambers =

American football player (1953–1981)

No. 51
- Position: Linebacker

Personal information
- Born: November 10, 1953; Amite City, Louisiana, U.S.
- Died: July 1, 1981 (aged 27); Hammond, Louisiana, U.S.
- Listed height: 6 ft 1 in (1.85 m)
- Listed weight: 218 lb (99 kg)

Career information
- College: Tulane
- NFL draft: 1975: undrafted

Career history
- New Orleans Saints (1975–1976); Miami Dolphins (1976–1980)

Career NFL statistics
- Fumble recoveries: 6
- Interceptions: 2
- Defensive TDs: 1
- Stats at Pro Football Reference

Russell Francis "Rusty" Chambers (November 10, 1953 – July 1, 1981) was an American professional football linebacker. He played for the Tulane Green Wave in college and professionally for the New Orleans Saints and Miami Dolphins of the National Football League (NFL). Chambers led the Dolphins in tackles for two consecutive years. His career was cut short at the age of 27 when he died in a car accident on July 1, 1981.

== Background ==
Chambers was born on November 10, 1953, in Amite City, Louisiana. His entire childhood was spent in southern Louisiana. He attended Loranger High School and received his college degree from Tulane University.

== College career ==
Chambers played from 1971 to 1974 at linebacker for the Tulane Green Wave football team under head coach Bennie Ellender. In 1973, Chambers helped lead his Tulane football team to its most successful season since 1934. The Green Wave won its first six games of the season, including three consecutive victories against top-twenty ranked opponents. The team finished with a 9–3 record and a final ranking of No. 15 in the UPI College Football Poll. Chambers led the team that season with 153 tackles. Chambers and his defensive teammates held five opponents to six points or less, including a 14–0 regular victory against in-state rival LSU in the regular season finale before a beyond-capacity crowd of 86,598 at Tulane Stadium. In that game, the Green Wave beat the LSU Tigers for the first time since 1948.

== Professional career ==
=== New Orleans Saints ===
Chambers went undrafted in the 1975 NFL draft; however, he signed a free agent contract with the New Orleans Saints which allowed him to stay at home in southern Louisiana. He played the entire 1975 season for the Saints as a backup linebacker and he contributed on the special-teams unit. On October 19, 1975, Chambers scored his only professional touchdown at Candlestick Park in a 21–35 loss against the San Francisco 49ers. During the fourth quarter, the 49ers punt returner fumbled the football. Chambers scooped it up and rumbled 38 yards for a Saints touchdown.

=== Miami Dolphins ===
In 1976, new Saints coach Hank Stram cut Chambers after the fourth game of the season. The Miami Dolphins immediately claimed him off waivers. Under the leadership of Coach Don Shula and Defensive Coordinator Bill Arnsparger, Chambers developed into a defensive leader for the Dolphins. During the 1977 season, Chambers earned a spot in the starting unit as the team's middle linebacker. In 1978, Chambers lead the Dolphins with 151 tackles. In 1979, he led the Dolphins with 178 tackles. Chambers was known for being modest and low-key. When asked to comment about leading the team in tackles, Chambers replied, "If I'm the leading tackler, I'm just doing my job."

In his position as middle linebacker, Chambers was responsible for holding the opponent's running backs to minimum gains. He only had 1.5 sacks and just two interceptions during his entire professional career. However, his first career interception placed him in the Dolphins record book. On December 3, 1978, the Dolphins faced the Washington Redskins at Robert F. Kennedy Memorial Stadium. Both teams were 9–5 and both were fighting for a spot in the playoffs. In the second quarter, with the Dolphins leading 3–0, the Redskins were driving at the Dolphins 27-yard line. The Redskins quarterback, Joe Theismann, fired a pass to his fullback, John Riggins. The ball slipped through Riggins' hands and into the waiting arms of Chambers. Chambers ran the ball 49 yards before being tackled at the Washington 23-yard line. That play deflated the Redskins and the Dolphins finished the game with a 16–0 shutout victory.

== Death ==
Just before midnight on July 1, 1981, Chambers was killed in an automobile accident in Hammond, Louisiana, five miles from his home. He was riding with friends Michal Piazza and Robert Hudson when the vehicle skidded off a wet road and flipped, pinning the passengers. Chambers and Piazza were killed, and Hudson suffered serious injuries. In honor of their fallen teammate, the Dolphins applied a patch with the number 51 on the back of each player's helmet for the entire 1981 season. Chambers wore jersey number 51 throughout his playing career. He is survived by his wife, Jackie.

== See also ==
- List of gridiron football players who died during their careers
