= Joe Rose (American football) =

American football player (born 1957)

No. 80, 83, 87
- Position: Tight end

Personal information
- Born: June 24, 1957 (age 69); Marysville, California, U.S.
- Listed height: 6 ft 3 in (1.91 m)
- Listed weight: 228 lb (103 kg)

Career information
- High school: Marysville
- College: California
- NFL draft: 1980: 7th round, 185th overall pick

Career history
- Miami Dolphins (1980–1985); Los Angeles Rams (1987)

Awards and highlights
- Second-team All-Pac-10 (1979)

Career NFL statistics
- Receptions: 112
- Receiving yards: 1,493
- Receiving touchdowns: 13
- Stats at Pro Football Reference

Joseph Harold Rose (born June 24, 1957) is an American former professional football player who was a tight end for six seasons with the Miami Dolphins from 1980 to 1985 and one game for the Los Angeles Rams in 1987 of the National Football League (NFL). He played college football for the California Golden Bears. He lives in Davie, Florida.

== Football career ==
Rose played high school football at Marysville High School in Marysville, California, where he led Northern California in reception yardage in his senior year. Rose played college football at the University of California, Berkeley, and was the hero of the 1979 Big Game between Cal and Stanford. He caught the game-winning touchdown pass, which was originally ruled incomplete but later changed (correctly) to a touchdown.

Rose was selected in the seventh round (185th overall pick) of the 1980 NFL draft by the Dolphins. Rose's best season in the NFL came in 1983 where he made 29 receptions for 345 yards and 3 touchdowns. His career statistics were 112 receptions, for 1493 yards with 13 touchdown receptions. Rose is best known for catching Hall of Famer Dan Marino's first ever touchdown pass in 1983.

== NFL career statistics ==
Legend
**Bold**	Career high

=== Regular season ===
Year	Team	Games		Receiving				
Year	Team	GP	GS	Rec	Yds	Avg	Lng	TD
1980	MIA	**16**	0	13	149	11.5	**50**	0
1981	MIA	**16**	0	23	316	13.7	**50**	2
1982	MIA	9	0	16	182	11.4	44	2
1983	MIA	**16**	0	**29**	**345**	11.9	37	3
1984	MIA	9	0	12	195	**16.3**	34	2
1985	MIA	**16**	**1**	19	306	16.1	42	**4**
1987	RAM	1	0	0	0	0.0	0	0
Career		83	1	112	1,493	13.3	50	13

=== Playoffs ===
Year	Team	Games		Receiving				
Year	Team	GP	GS	Rec	Yds	Avg	Lng	TD
1981	MIA	1	0	4	37	9.3	15	**2**
1982	MIA	**4**	0	3	67	**22.3**	**35**	0
1983	MIA	1	0	1	15	15.0	15	0
1984	MIA	3	0	**8**	**114**	14.3	30	0
1985	MIA	2	0	2	27	13.5	17	0
Career		11	0	18	260	14.4	35	2

== Broadcasting career ==
After retiring from football, Rose became a radio broadcaster in the Miami area. He hosts a wake-up show weekday mornings on WQAM 560 AM. Rose is also the color commentator on the Dolphins Radio Network broadcasts and for a time was a sports anchor for WTVJ-TV in Miami.
