= Cleveland Green =

American football player (born 1957)

No. 61, 74
- Position: Offensive tackle

Personal information
- Born: September 11, 1957 (age 69); Bolton, Mississippi, U.S.
- Listed height: 6 ft 3 in (1.91 m)
- Listed weight: 265 lb (120 kg)

Career information
- High school: Hinds County Agricultural (MS)
- College: Southern
- NFL draft: 1979: undrafted

Career history
- Miami Dolphins (1979–1986)

Career NFL statistics
- Games played: 92
- Games started: 32
- Fumble recoveries: 1
- Stats at Pro Football Reference

Cleveland Carl Green (born September 11, 1957) is a former offensive tackle. He played eight seasons in the National Football League (NFL) for the Miami Dolphins from 1979 to 1986. He started in Super Bowl XIX.
