= Steve Shull =

American football player (born 1958)

No. 59, 52
- Position: Linebacker

Personal information
- Born: March 27, 1958 (age 68); Philadelphia, Pennsylvania, U.S.
- Listed height: 6 ft 1 in (1.85 m)
- Listed weight: 220 lb (100 kg)

Career information
- High school: Neshaminy (Langhorne, Pennsylvania)
- College: William & Mary
- NFL draft: 1980: undrafted

Career history
- Miami Dolphins (1980–1982)

Career NFL statistics
- Games played: 41
- Fumble recoveries: 2
- Stats at Pro Football Reference

Steven Mark Shull (born March 27, 1958) is an American former professional football player who was a linebacker for the Miami Dolphins of the National Football League (NFL). He played college football for the William & Mary Tribe. Shull played in 41 regular season NFL games between 1980 and 1982 before a knee injury ended his career. He was named one of the three captains for Super Bowl XVII, which the Dolphins lost to the Washington Redskins 27–17.

Shull was born in Philadelphia, Pennsylvania and is Jewish.
