= Andra Franklin =

American football player (1959–2006)

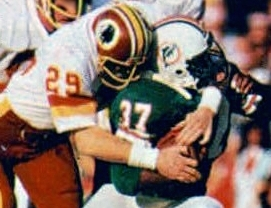
- Franklin (37) in Super Bowl XVII

No. 37
- Position: Running back

Personal information
- Born: August 22, 1959; Anniston, Alabama, U.S.
- Died: December 6, 2006 (aged 47); Lincoln, Nebraska, U.S.
- Listed height: 5 ft 10 in (1.78 m)
- Listed weight: 225 lb (102 kg)

Career information
- High school: Anniston
- College: Nebraska
- NFL draft: 1981: 2nd round, 56th overall pick

Career history
- Miami Dolphins (1981–1984)

Awards and highlights
- Pro Bowl (1982); Second-team All-Big Eight (1980)

Career NFL statistics
- Rushing yards: 2,232
- Rushing average: 3.6
- Rushing touchdowns: 22
- Stats at Pro Football Reference

Andra Bernard Franklin (August 22, 1959 – December 6, 2006) was an American professional football player who was a running back for the Miami Dolphins of the National Football League (NFL) from 1981 to 1984. Franklin played college football for the Nebraska Cornhuskers; he died at age 47 from heart failure in 2006.

== Career ==
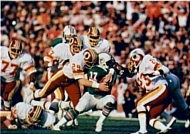
Franklin (middle) rushing the ball in Super Bowl XVII

From Anniston, Alabama, Franklin played at the University of Nebraska–Lincoln from 1977 through 1980, rushing for 1,738 yards and 10 touchdowns. He was selected in the second round of the 1981 NFL draft (56th overall) by the Dolphins, and played under head coach Don Shula.

Franklin led the Dolphins in rushing during the strike-shortened 1982 season, third overall in the NFL, with 701 yards in nine games. The Dolphins won the AFC title and met the Washington Redskins in Super Bowl XVII in January 1983 at the Rose Bowl in Pasadena, California. He appeared on the cover of Sports Illustrated after Miami's win over the San Diego Chargers in the AFC semifinals.

His playing career was cut short by a knee injury, his last game was on September 9, 1984.

== NFL career statistics ==
Legend
	Led the league
**Bold**	Career high

=== Regular season ===
Year	Team	Games		Rushing					Receiving				
Year	Team	GP	GS	Att	Yds	Avg	Lng	TD	Rec	Yds	Avg	Lng	TD
1981	MIA	**16**	11	201	711	3.5	**29**	7	**3**	6	2.0	3	**1**
1982	MIA	9	9	177	701	**4.0**	25	7	**3**	**9**	**3.0**	**6**	0
1983	MIA	15	**12**	**224**	**746**	3.3	18	**8**	0	0	0.0	0	0
1984	MIA	2	2	20	74	3.7	12	0	0	0	0.0	0	0
		42	34	622	2,232	3.6	29	22	6	15	2.5	6	1

=== Playoffs ===
Year	Team	Games		Rushing					Receiving				
Year	Team	GP	GS	Att	Yds	Avg	Lng	TD	Rec	Yds	Avg	Lng	TD
1981	MIA	1	1	9	6	0.7	3	0	0	0	0.0	0	0
1982	MIA	**4**	**3**	**78**	**301**	3.9	**12**	**2**	0	0	0.0	0	0
1983	MIA	1	1	6	28	**4.7**	9	0	0	0	0.0	0	0
		6	5	93	335	3.6	12	2	0	0	0.0	0	0
