= Mike Robbie =

American football general manager (born 1943)

Mike Robbie (born April 5, 1943) is a former general manager of the Miami Dolphins National Football League team and the son of Joe Robbie, former owner of the team.
