= Eddie Hill (American football) =

American football player (1957–2025)

Eddie Wayne Hill
No. 24, 31
- Position: Running back

Personal information
- Born: May 13, 1957; Nashville, Tennessee, U.S.
- Died: February 23, 2025 (aged 67)
- Listed height: 6 ft 2 in (1.88 m)
- Listed weight: 205 lb (93 kg)

Career information
- High school: Hillsboro (Nashville)
- College: Memphis
- NFL draft: 1979: 2nd round, 54th overall pick

Career history
- Los Angeles Rams (1979–1980); Miami Dolphins (1981–1984)

Career NFL statistics
- Rushing yards: 443
- Rushing average: 3.7
- Rushing touchdowns: 2
- Stats at Pro Football Reference

Eddie Wayne Hill (May 13, 1957 – February 23, 2025) was an American professional football player who was a running back for the Los Angeles Rams and Miami Dolphins of the National Football League (NFL). He played college football for the Memphis Tigers. Hill was selected by the Rams in the second round of the 1979 NFL draft.

Hill was traded from the Rams to the Dolphins in 1981.

== Personal life and death ==
On March 30, 1989, Hill was arrested for possession of cocaine, in Fort Lauderdale, Florida. The next day, he was released on a US$1000 bond.

Hill had four children: Valencia, Quadtrine, Blaize, and Kyra.

In later years, Hill had remitting brain cancer. He also believed that he had CTE, a neurodegenerative head injury, but he did not regret having played football. Hill died on February 23, 2025, at the age of 67.
