= Eric Laakso =

American football player (1956–2010)

No. 65, 68
- Position: Tackle

Personal information
- Born: November 29, 1956; New York City, New York, U.S.
- Died: December 25, 2010 (aged 54); Pompano Beach, Florida, U.S.
- Listed height: 6 ft 4 in (1.93 m)
- Listed weight: 285 lb (129 kg)

Career information
- High school: Killingly (CT)
- College: Tulane
- NFL draft: 1978: 4th round, 106th overall pick

Career history
- Miami Dolphins (1978–1984)

Career NFL statistics
- Games played: 86
- Games started: 61
- Fumble recoveries: 1
- Stats at Pro Football Reference

Eric Henry Laakso (November 29, 1956 – December 25, 2010) was an American professional football offensive tackle and guard. He played seven seasons for the Miami Dolphins of the National Football League (NFL), a tenure which included two Super Bowls. After high school at Killingly in Danielson, CT he attended Tulane University, where he majored in civil engineering and played offensive tackle from 1975 to 1977 and was honored as the 1976–77 Tulane Athlete of the year. Laakso was selected 106th overall by the Dolphins in the fourth round of the 1978 NFL draft. Laakso resided in South Florida and was active with NFL Alumni functions.

Laakso was found dead in his home in Pompano Beach on Christmas night. The death was attributed to natural causes; Laakso battled heart disease.

== Career highlights ==
- Tulane Offensive Tackle 1975–77
- 1976–77 Tulane Athlete of the year
- 4th round Draft Pick 106th overall, 1978, Miami
- Miami Dolphins(#68) Offensive Tackle 1978–1984
- Super Bowl XVII (1982)
- Super Bowl XIX (1984)

== See also ==
- List of retired professional American football players
- Miami Dolphins
- Miami Dolphins seasons
