= Bill Barnett =

American football player (born 1956)

No. 70
- Positions: Defensive tackle, defensive end

Personal information
- Born: May 10, 1956 (age 70); St. Paul, Minnesota, U.S.
- Listed height: 6 ft 4 in (1.93 m)
- Listed weight: 258 lb (117 kg)

Career information
- High school: Stillwater (Oak Park Heights, Minnesota)
- College: Nebraska
- NFL draft: 1980: 3rd round, 75th overall pick

Career history
- Miami Dolphins (1980–1985)

Awards and highlights
- Second-team All-Big Eight (1979)

Career NFL statistics
- Sacks: 2.5
- Fumble recoveries: 2
- Stats at Pro Football Reference

William Perry Barnett (born May 10, 1956) is an American former professional football player who was a defensive tackle for six seasons for the Miami Dolphins in the National Football League (NFL). He lives in Lincoln, NE as a copyright maintaining a residence in northern MN for fishing expeditions.
