= Earnie Rhone =

American football player and coach (born 1953)

No. 55
- Position: Linebacker

Personal information
- Born: August 20, 1953 (age 73); Ogden, Arkansas, U.S.
- Listed height: 6 ft 2 in (1.88 m)
- Listed weight: 220 lb (100 kg)

Career information
- High school: Ashdown (AR)
- College: Henderson State
- NFL draft: 1975: undrafted

Career history

Playing
- Miami Dolphins (1975–1984)

Coaching
- Texas High School (assistant coach) (1993–2018)

Career NFL statistics
- Sacks: 13
- Interceptions: 14
- Fumble recoveries: 4
- Stats at Pro Football Reference

Earnest Calvin Rhone (born August 20, 1953) is an American former professional football player who was a linebacker for 10 seasons for the Miami Dolphins of the National Football League (NFL). He played college football for the Henderson State Reddies. After his playing career, he was an assistant high school football coach at Texas High School from 1993 to 2018.
