= Mike Kozlowski =

American football player (born 1956)

No. 37, 40
- Position: Safety

Personal information
- Born: February 24, 1956 (age 70); Newark, New Jersey, U.S.
- Listed height: 6 ft 0 in (1.83 m)
- Listed weight: 196 lb (89 kg)

Career information
- High school: San Dieguito
- College: Colorado
- NFL draft: 1979: 10th round, 272nd overall pick

Career history
- Miami Dolphins (1979–1986)

Career NFL statistics
- Interceptions: 8
- Fumble recoveries: 5
- Sacks: 2
- Stats at Pro Football Reference

Michael John Kozlowski (born February 24, 1956) is an American former professional football player who was a safety for the Miami Dolphins of the National Football League (NFL) from 1979 to 1986. Kozlowski was a tailback playing college football for the Colorado Buffaloes (1977–78) before switching to defense with the Dolphins.

Kozlowski's brother Glen played wide receiver in the NFL for six years (1987–1992) with the Chicago Bears. Kozlowski's father is Polish and his mother is Samoan and Hawaiian.
