= Gerald Small =

American football player (1956–2008)

No. 48
- Position: Cornerback

Personal information
- Born: August 10, 1956; Washington, D.C., U.S.
- Died: September 28, 2008 (aged 52); Sacramento, California, U.S.
- Listed height: 5 ft 11 in (1.80 m)
- Listed weight: 192 lb (87 kg)

Career information
- College: San Jose State
- NFL draft: 1978: 4th round, 93rd overall pick

Career history
- Miami Dolphins (1978–1983); Atlanta Falcons (1984)

Career NFL statistics
- Interceptions: 24
- Fumble recoveries: 6
- Touchdowns: 1
- Stats at Pro Football Reference

Gerald Small (August 10, 1956 – September 27, 2008) was an American professional football player who was a cornerback for seven seasons for the Miami Dolphins and Atlanta Falcons.

== College career ==
In 1975, Small led San Jose State to a Pacific Coast Athletic Conference (PCAC) championship over San Diego State by making two interceptions in the fourth quarter. He missed much of his senior season due to a shoulder injury.

== Professional career ==
=== Miami Dolphins (1978–1983) ===
Coming into the draft, Small was seen as the fourth best defensive back in his draft class. He was selected by the Miami Dolphins in the fourth round of the 1978 NFL draft with the 93rd overall pick. At first, Small was used sparingly in his rookie season, appearing in every game. He made nine tackles through the first 13 games before starting Miami's final three games at right cornerback. In those three games, Small picked off four passes, returning them for 157 total yards. This included two in a week 15 23–6 victory over the Oakland Raiders in which he picked off quarterback Ken Stabler twice for 85 return yards and his first career touchdown. With the win, Miami advanced to the playoffs for the first time in four years.

In 1979, Small started all 16 games for the Dolphins at right cornerback. He totaled 29 tackles and five interceptions for 74 return yards, defending seven passes for the 10–6 Dolphins. Miami made the playoffs, but lost to the Pittsburgh Steelers, 34–14 in the first round.

1980 would see Miami miss the playoffs with an 8–8 record. Small again started all 16 games for the Dolphins, intercepting a career high seven passes, returning them for 46 yards, and also recovered a fumble. During that season, he struggled with a hip pointer injury.

In 1981, Miami posted an 11–4–1 record. Small started every game for Miami at right cornerback as the team qualified for the playoffs, but were ousted by the San Diego Chargers, 41–38 in overtime. Miami's defense led the AFC by allowing 275 points and tied for second in the NFL by allowing only 10 rushing touchdowns. However, he struggled that season as he didn't record any interceptions after leading the team in interceptions the previous season.

Small then had shoulder surgery in the offseason, and missed majority of the Dolphins' preseason games. In the strike-shortened 1982 season, he picked off two passes as the Dolphins finished 7–2. The Dolphins began their playoff run by eliminating the New England Patriots. Then they avenged their playoff loss to the Chargers the previous season. In that game, Smalls got an interception of a Dan Fouts pass. They then made it to the AFC championship game where they faced the New York Jets, led by his college rival Wesley Walker. In that game, they shut down the Jets 14–0, the first playoff whitewash in 14 years by holding Walker to just one catch. With the win, they made it to Super Bowl XVII against the Washington Redskins. There, the Redskins defeated them 27–17.

In 1983, Small missed a week four start, breaking his string of 69 consecutive starts (including playoffs), but started the other 15 games for Miami. He finished the year with five interceptions as the Dolphins again made the playoffs, this time going 12–4. However, they were upset in the playoffs by the Seattle Seahawks.

In his time at Miami, Small totaled 23 interceptions over 88 games for the Dolphins over six seasons. His 23 interceptions ranked third on the Dolphins' all-time interceptions list. He also amassed 378 interception return yards to lead Miami in the all-time rankings and made 83 starts.

=== Atlanta Falcons (1984) ===
In 1984, Small was traded to the Atlanta Falcons for offensive lineman Ronnie Lee and a draft pick. The trade happened late in the Falcons' training camp, so he wasn't able to practice with the team during the preseason. In his lone season, he had limited playing time and only started once. The following season, he was cut from the team. That would be his final season in the NFL.

== Personal life and death ==
On June 24, 1984, Small's car was broken into and his $200 radar detector was stolen. His teammate Nat Moore also had his car broken into and his radar detector stolen in a separate incident that same day.

Small died at the age of 52 in 2008, in Sacramento, California, where he was unemployed, and was living with an aunt at the time of his death. His brain was examined, where evidence was found of chronic traumatic encephalopathy (CTE).
