= Bruce Hardy =

American football player (born 1956)

No. 84
- Position: Tight end

Personal information
- Born: June 1, 1956 (age 70); Murray, Utah, U.S.
- Listed height: 6 ft 5 in (1.96 m)
- Listed weight: 232 lb (105 kg)

Career information
- High school: Bingham (South Jordan, Utah)
- College: Arizona State
- NFL draft: 1978: 9th round, 247th overall pick

Career history
- Miami Dolphins (1978–1989)

Career NFL statistics
- Receptions: 256
- Receiving yards: 2,455
- Receiving touchdowns: 25
- Stats at Pro Football Reference

Bruce Alan Hardy (born June 1, 1956, in Murray, Utah), is an American former professional football player who was a tight end for the Miami Dolphins of the National Football League (NFL). He played college football for the Arizona State Sun Devils and was selected by the Dolphins in the ninth round of the 1978 NFL draft. Hardy played his entire NFL career with the Dolphins from 1978 to 1989. He was married to Joanie Hardy for 20 years and has four sons: Nathan, Adam, Aaron and Matthew. He coached in the Arena Football League for the Florida Bobcats before coaching for Florida International University.

In 1974, while in high school, Hardy appeared on the cover of Sports Illustrated. He was the 4th prep player so honored, but the first football player. The first three being all high school basketball stars.

== Career Receiving Stats ==
- 151 Games
- 256 Receptions
- 2,455 Yards
- 9.6 Avg.
- 25 Touchdowns
