= Don Strock =

American football player and coach (born 1950)

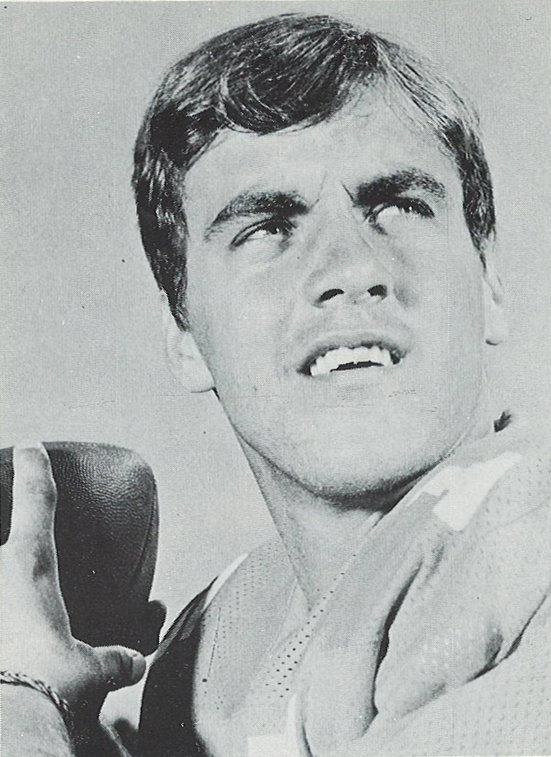
- Strock, c. 1971

No. 10, 12
- Position: Quarterback

Personal information
- Born: November 27, 1950 (age 75); Pottstown, Pennsylvania, U.S.
- Listed height: 6 ft 5 in (1.96 m)
- Listed weight: 220 lb (100 kg)

Career information
- High school: Owen J. Roberts (Bucktown, Pennsylvania)
- College: Virginia Tech (1969–1972)
- NFL draft: 1973: 5th round, 111th overall pick

Career history

Playing
- Miami Dolphins (1973–1987); Cleveland Browns (1988); Indianapolis Colts (1989)

Coaching
- Miami Hooters (1993) Head coach; Massachusetts Marauders (1994) Head coach; Rhein Fire (1995) Offensive coordinator; Baltimore Ravens (1996–1998) Quarterbacks coach; Florida International (2000–2006) Head coach

Awards and highlights
- Super Bowl champion (VIII); Dolphins Walk of Fame (2012); Sammy Baugh Trophy (1972); Third-team All-American (1972); NCAA passing yards leader (1972)

Career NFL statistics
- Passing attempts: 779
- Passing completions: 443
- Completion percentage: 56.9%
- TD–INT: 45–42
- Passing yards: 5,349
- Passer rating: 74.9
- Stats at Pro Football Reference

Head coaching record
- Regular season: AFL: 13–11 (.542)
- Postseason: AFL: 1–2 (.333)
- Career: AFL: 14–13 (.519); NCAA: 15–41 (.268)

Donald Joseph Strock (born November 27, 1950) is an American former professional football player and coach. He played as a quarterback in the National Football League (NFL) with the Miami Dolphins (1973–1987), Cleveland Browns (1988), and Indianapolis Colts (1989).

Strock played college football for the Virginia Tech Hokies and was selected by the Dolphins in the fifth round of the 1973 NFL draft. After his playing career, he became a coach, serving as the head coach at Florida International University from 2002 to 2006, compiling a record of 15–41.

== Playing career ==
=== College ===
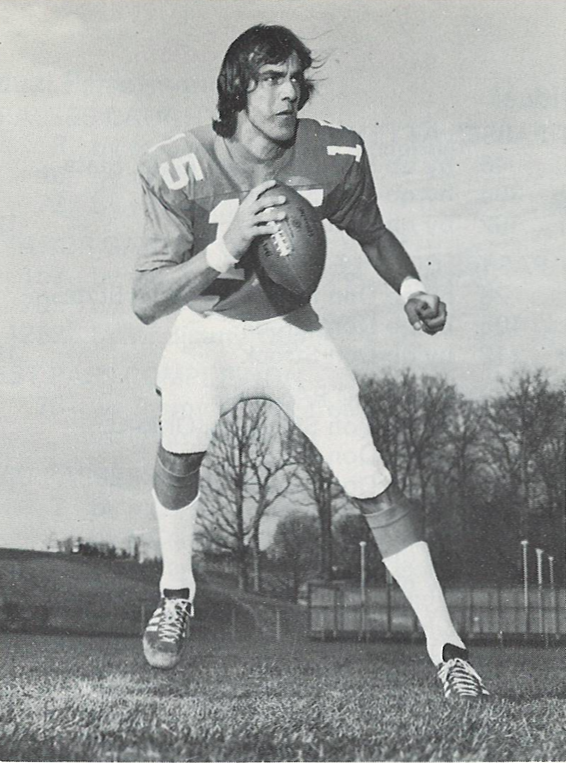
Strock at Virginia Tech, c. 1971

Strock attended Virginia Tech. In his senior season in 1972, he led the nation in total passing and total offense, yet finished only ninth in voting for the Heisman Trophy. He was voted third-team All-America. The college game was then dominated by running backs; the 1972 Heisman went to wingback Johnny Rodgers of Nebraska.

To date, Strock still holds many collegiate football passing records at his alma mater and was inducted into the Virginia Tech Sports Hall of Fame in 1985.

=== Professional ===
Strock played in the NFL as a quarterback. A 5th round selection (111th overall pick) of the 1973 NFL draft, he spent the majority of his professional career with the Miami Dolphins (1973–1987), and was mostly known for his role as a back-up to Hall-of Famers Bob Griese in his first years with the team and Dan Marino as he finished his career with the club. He also played one season with the Cleveland Browns (1988) and part of a season on the roster of the Indianapolis Colts (1989) before retiring as a player.

Strock was a member of the "taxi squad" during the 1973 season when the Dolphins won their second straight Super Bowl following the undefeated 1972–73 season. He was also a member of the Dolphin teams who played and lost in the 1982 and 1984 Super Bowls.

Strock is remembered for coming off the bench on January 2, 1982, for the Miami Dolphins in an AFC Divisional Playoff Game against the San Diego Chargers at the Miami Orange Bowl. Strock led Miami from a 24–0 deficit to tie the score in the 3rd quarter. Ultimately, Miami lost the game to San Diego, 41–38, in overtime. The game is also remembered for the image of San Diego tight end Kellen Winslow being helped off the field by his teammates after the game while suffering from exhaustion. Strock finished the game with 29 of 43 completions for 403 yards and four touchdowns, with one interception. The game later became known as The Epic in Miami and has entered NFL lore as one of the greatest games ever in NFL history.

On September 13, 1987, Dolphins punter Reggie Roby was injured and Strock was called upon to punt. Strock also was called into duty to quarterback in the game with 2:22 remaining, nearly leading a comeback drive.

== Coaching career ==
=== Arena Football League, the World League and the NFL ===
Strock began his coaching career as the head coach of the Miami Hooters of the Arena Football League for one season in 1993. The following season, he moved on to be the head coach of the Massachusetts Marauders and again only stayed for one season. He then moved on to be an assistant coach of the Rhein Fire in the World League during 1995 season. Between 1996 and 1998 seasons, he was the quarterbacks coach of the Baltimore Ravens in the NFL.

=== FIU ===
On September 13, 2000, Strock was named the first head football coach in FIU's history. He was named to the position just shy of two years before the university's inaugural football game. Prior to being named head coach he was the director of football operations, a job he had obtained the year before. His overall record through the 2006 football season was 15–41.

On November 15, 2006, Strock resigned as head coach of the FIU Golden Panthers. Of his 15 career victories, none came during the 2006 campaign and only three of them came against NCAA Division I-A opponents. His resignation came after an 0–9 start and a much-publicized brawl against the Miami Hurricanes caused 16 players from FIU to be suspended. His resignation became effective following FIU's last game against Troy University on December 2, 2006.

== Head coaching record ==
=== College ===
Year	Team	Overall	Conference	Standing	Bowl/playoffs
FIU Golden Panthers (NCAA Division I-AA independent) (2002–2004)
2002	FIU	5–6			
2003	FIU	2–10			
2004	FIU	3–7			
FIU Golden Panthers (Sun Belt Conference) (2005–2006)
2005	FIU	5–6	3–4	T–4th	
2006	FIU	0–12	0–7	5th	
FIU:		15–41	3–11		
Total:		15–41			

== See also ==
- List of NCAA major college football yearly passing leaders
- List of NCAA major college football yearly total offense leaders
