= 1984 Holiday Bowl =

Michigan Wolverines	BYU Cougars
(6–5)	(12–0)
Big Ten	WAC
17	24
Head coach: Bo Schembechler	Head coach: LaVell Edwards
	AP / Coaches; 1 / 1
	1	2	3	4	Total
Michigan	0	7	7	3	17
BYU	0	10	0	14	24
- Date: December 21, 1984
- Season: 1984
- Stadium: Jack Murphy Stadium
- Location: San Diego, California
- MVP: Robbie Bosco (offensive); Leon White (defensive)
- Favorite: BYU by 7
- Referee: Wendell Shelton (SWC)
- Attendance: 61,243
- Payout: US$502,635 per team

United States TV coverage
- Network: Mizlou / ESPN
- Announcers: Howard David, Paul Maguire

The 1984 Holiday Bowl was a bowl game contested in college football for the 1984 season. Played on December 21 at Jack Murphy Stadium in San Diego, California, it pitted the unranked Michigan Wolverines against the top-ranked BYU Cougars. Despite six turnovers and being down by seven in the fourth quarter, BYU rallied and won the game, 24–17. The attendance of 61,243 was a record for Jack Murphy Stadium at that time.

BYU's victory helped propel them to being a consensus selection for the national championship for the 1984 season. This game marks a rare example of a team named as national champion by NCAA-recognized selector(s) playing their bowl game during the month of December.

== National championship ==
At the conclusion of the 1984 regular season, BYU was the only undefeated team in Division I-A. As such, BYU was ranked first in the polls and was the leading candidate to be chosen as national champion if it were to win its bowl game. However, BYU, as nine-time defending champion of the Western Athletic Conference (WAC), was obligated to play in the Holiday Bowl, in its seventh season, and the WAC was considered a lower-tier conference of Division I-A. As such, the Holiday Bowl was not likely to draw a high-caliber opponent for BYU.

Even though BYU was the only undefeated and untied team in Division I-A, many poll voters were reluctant to crown the Cougars as national champion. They felt that BYU's strength of schedule was too weak for the Cougars to be considered a credible pick for national champion. BYU had only played one ranked opponent, preseason #3 Pittsburgh (3–7–1) in the season opener. Only two of their opponents won at least seven games. No WAC team was BYU's equal; the Cougars were the only team in the conference with fewer than four overall losses. Additionally, many voters felt the Cougars' statistics were inflated by the heavily pass-oriented brand of football of the WAC.

Rumors spread that BYU would break its contract to play in the Fiesta Bowl. Heisman Trophy winner Doug Flutie's Boston College Eagles and six others turned down the Holiday Bowl's low $500,000 payout, forcing the Holiday Bowl to settle for unranked Michigan. The 6–5 Wolverines had been ranked third early in the season, but lost home games to Washington and Michigan State; quarterback Jim Harbaugh suffered a broken left arm against MSU on October 6 and was out for the season. With untested sophomore backups Russ Rein and Chris Zurbrugg at quarterback, they lost road games at Iowa, Purdue, and Ohio State.

Michigan head coach Bo Schembechler was among those skeptical of BYU, stating that "There's no way this team should be a better passing team than Illinois, Miami, Iowa, or Purdue." The seven-point underdog Wolverines managed to give BYU a tough game, but the Cougars won, 24–17, and were later narrowly named the consensus national champions on January 2.

== Game summary ==
Friday, December 21, 1984; 6 p.m. PST

=== First quarter ===
BYU's first drive ended when quarterback Robbie Bosco threw an interception. On the second drive, Bosco was carried off the field after a roughing-the-passer penalty led to a knee ligament strain. He was replaced by Blaine Fowler, who came in with the game still scoreless. Fowler's first pass was deflected at the line of scrimmage. On his second play, Fowler threw a short pass for a first down on 3rd and 2, but the Cougars eventually punted.

=== Second quarter ===
Bosco returned on BYU's next possession and led the Cougars to their first touchdown of the game, a run by Kelly Smith with 8:33 remaining in the second quarter. Besides throwing several passes, Bosco also made a gutsy scramble for a first down.

Michigan's next possession ended in an attempted punt. The BYU defenders, however, penetrated too quickly and the punter had no time to punt. He was promptly tackled out of bounds at the 5-yard line. On the ensuing possession, though, the Cougars failed to take advantage as Bosco fumbled the ball into the endzone on 3rd and goal from the 3. Michigan recovered for a touchback.

The Wolverines responded with a drive down the field for a touchdown. They were aided by an unsportsmanlike conduct call against BYU, and later a running into the kicker penalty after Michigan had kicked a field goal. Rick Rogers scored for Michigan on a 5-yard run to tie the game at seven. BYU took the ball deep in their own territory, ran a two-minute drill, and kicked a field goal with four seconds left to take a 10–7 lead into halftime.

=== Third quarter ===
On BYU's opening possession of the second half, Bosco's pass went off the fingertips of Lakei Heimuli, and Michigan's Mike Mallory intercepted it. After a Michigan punt, BYU committed another turnover when Bosco was stripped by Jim Scarcelli and Michigan recovered.

With 3:20 to play in the third, a field goal attempt by Lee Johnson was blocked. After the block, Michigan drove down and scored on a touchdown pass from quarterback Chris Zurbrugg to Bob Perryman, giving them a 14–10 lead. The ensuing kickoff was bobbled by Vai Sikahema who was then tackled on the 5-yard line. BYU then fumbled again a few plays later and Michigan recovered with 6 seconds remaining in the third quarter. This was BYU's fifth turnover of the game.

=== Fourth quarter ===
BYU's defense held, forcing Michigan to settle for a field goal despite advancing the ball to the 10-yard line. This gave the Wolverines a 17–10 lead and thus setting up another BYU epic Holiday Bowl comeback as in the 1980 and 1983 game.

BYU drove the length of the field and scored with 10:51 remaining on a 7-yard Bosco to Glen Kozlowski touchdown pass to tie the game at 17. Fowler recounts that, following that touchdown play, Kozlowski jokingly accused Bosco of trying to throw the ball away because the pass was extremely high and too strong, but Kozlowski made a sensational circus catch.

After a Michigan punt, BYU took possession but another Bosco pass was intercepted after it went off the hand of Kozlowski and into the hands of Jim Scarcelli. BYU then forced yet another Michigan punt. Finally, BYU drove the length of the field and scored on a pass from an injured Bosco to Kelly Smith with 1:23 remaining. Marv Allen, who also played in the very first Holiday Bowl as a redshirt freshman six years earlier in 1978, sealed the victory with an interception, Michigan's sole turnover.

== Statistics ==
Statistics	Michigan	BYU
First downs	13	32
Rushes–yards	49–120	27–112
Passing yards	82	371
Passes	7–15–1	35–49–3
Total yards	202	483
Sacks by	2–11	4–54
Punts–average	7–39	1–45
Fumbles–lost	2–0	4–3
Turnovers by	1	6
Penalties–yards	11–112	9–82
Time of possession	31:01	28:59

== Aftermath ==
Schembechler complained after the game that BYU "should be outlawed" because it was "the worst holding team in the United States of America" (BYU had no holding penalties). Despite Michigan's mediocre record, Brigham Young's two-year spanning win-streak, their position as the lone undefeated team in the nation that year, and their ability to defeat a traditional powerhouse in a bowl game were enough to sway the voters. The Cougars remained at the top of both the AP and UPI/Coaches' polls, though they had to wait until January 2 for the final results. This was the only time in college football history that the eventual national champion played its bowl game prior to New Year's Eve.

Controversy continued after the bowl season among supporters of the Washington Huskies of the Pac-10, who believed that they had been deprived of a national championship. As a result, BYU would be pitted against a formidable opponent in the Kickoff Classic to open the 1985 season. They faced the Boston College Eagles, who had finished the previous season ranked fourth and fifth in the UPI and AP polls, respectively. Brigham Young won this matchup with the Eagles 28–14; BC had lost their Heisman Trophy-winning quarterback Doug Flutie to graduation and finished at 4–8. Two weeks later, BYU faced the Washington Huskies for the first time; UW had finished the previous season ranked closely behind BYU in both major polls, and had been one of the more vocal detractors of the previous year's official outcome. With much of the Huskies' vaunted 1984 defense lost to graduation, Brigham Young won the match-up in Provo by a lopsided score of 31–3, and Washington finished the regular season at 6–5. BYU's winning streak, which began in 1983, ended the week before at 25 games with a 27–24 home loss to UCLA, who went on to win the Pac-10 and the Rose Bowl.
