= 1984 Michigan Wolverines football team =

American college football season

1984 Michigan Wolverines football

Holiday Bowl, L 17–24 vs. BYU
- Conference: Big Ten Conference
- Record: 6–6 (5–4 Big Ten)
- Head coach: Bo Schembechler (16th season)
- Defensive coordinator: Gary Moeller (7th season)
- MVP: Mike Mallory
- Captains: Doug James; Mike Mallory
- Home stadium: Michigan Stadium

1984 Big Ten Conference football standings
	Conf.					Overall
Team	W		L		T	W		L		T
No. 13 Ohio State $	7	–	2	–	0	9	–	3	–	0
Illinois	6	–	3	–	0	7	–	4	–	0
Purdue	6	–	3	–	0	7	–	5	–	0
No. 16 Iowa	5	–	3	–	1	8	–	4	–	1
Wisconsin	5	–	3	–	1	7	–	4	–	1
Michigan State	5	–	4	–	0	6	–	6	–	0
Michigan	5	–	4	–	0	6	–	6	–	0
Minnesota	3	–	6	–	0	4	–	7	–	0
Northwestern	2	–	7	–	0	2	–	9	–	0
Indiana	0	–	9	–	0	0	–	11	–	0
$ – Conference champion; Rankings from AP Poll

The 1984 Michigan Wolverines Football team season was an American football team that represented the University of Michigan in the 1984 Big Ten Conference football season. In their 16th season under head coach Bo Schembechler, the Wolverines compiled a 6–6 record (5–4 against conference opponents) and outscored opponents by a total of 214 to 200. It was the only team in Michigan's 21 seasons under coach Schembechler that did not finish its season with a winning record.

Michigan began the season under quarterback Jim Harbaugh. The Wolverines went 3–1 in their first four games under Harbaugh, but Harbaugh's season ended with a broken arm in a loss to Michigan State. Michigan next turned to Russ Rein who started two games, including a 26–0 loss to Iowa, the worst loss for a Michigan team since Schembechler took over as head coach. Chris Zurbrugg took over as quarterback for the remaining five games in which the Wolverines won two and lost three. In the 1984 Holiday Bowl, Michigan lost to national champion BYU. BYU quarterback Robbie Bosco led a fourth-quarter comeback with two touchdown passes, including the game winner with 83 seconds remaining in the game.

Linebacker Mike Mallory was selected as the most valuable player on the Michigan team. The team's statistical leaders included quarterback Jim Harbaugh with 718 passing yards, tailback Jamie Morris with 573 rushing yards, tight end Sim Nelson with 459 receiving yards, and placekicker Bob Bergeron with 60 points scored.

== Schedule ==
Date	Time	Opponent	Rank	Site	TV	Result	Attendance
September 8	1:00 p.m.	No. 1 Miami (FL)*	No. 14	Michigan Stadium; Ann Arbor, MI	KATZ	W 22–14	105,403
September 15	12:00 p.m.	No. 16 Washington*	No. 3	Michigan Stadium; Ann Arbor, MI	CBS	L 11–20	103,072
September 22	1:00 p.m.	Wisconsin	No. 16	Michigan Stadium; Ann Arbor, MI		W 20–14	104,239
September 29	1:00 p.m.	at Indiana	No. 14	Memorial Stadium; Bloomington, IN		W 14–6	38,729
October 6	1:00 p.m.	Michigan State	No. 13	Michigan Stadium; Ann Arbor, MI (rivalry)	SV	L 7–19	105,612
October 13	1:00 p.m.	Northwestern^{†}		Michigan Stadium; Ann Arbor, MI (rivalry)		W 31–0	102,245
October 20	12:00 p.m.	at No. 18 Iowa		Kinnick Stadium; Iowa City, IA	CBS	L 0–26	66,025
October 27	1:00 p.m.	Illinois		Michigan Stadium; Ann Arbor, MI (rivalry)		W 26–18	104,916
November 3	1:30 p.m.	at Purdue		Ross–Ade Stadium; West Lafayette, IN		L 29–31	60,159
November 10	1:00 p.m.	Minnesota		Michigan Stadium; Ann Arbor, MI (Little Brown Jug)		W 31–7	101,247
November 17	12:00 p.m.	at No. 11 Ohio State		Ohio Stadium; Columbus, OH (The Game)	CBS	L 6–21	90,286
December 21	9:00 p.m.	vs. No. 1 BYU*		Jack Murphy Stadium; San Diego, CA (Holiday Bowl)	MTN	L 17–24	61,243
*Non-conference game; ^{†}Homecoming; Rankings from AP Poll released prior to the game; All times are in Eastern time

== Season summary ==
=== Preseason ===
The 1983 Michigan Wolverines football team had compiled a 9–3, lost to Auburn in the Sugar Bowl, and was ranked No. 8 in the final AP poll. Several key players from the 1983 team did not return in 1984, including Steve Smith, a three-year starter at quarterback, and All-American offensive linemen Stefan Humphries and Tom Dixon.

In preseason competition, Jim Harbaugh won the starting quarterback position over Bo Rein and Chris Zurbrugg. Offensive guard Doug James and linebacker Mike Mallory were selected as the team co-captains.

=== Miami (FL) ===
Week 1: Miami at Michigan

Team	1	2	3	4	Total
No. 1 Miami	0	0	7	7	14
• No. 14 Michigan	6	0	6	10	22

- Date: September 8
- Location: Ann Arbor, MI
- Game attendance: 105,403
- Television network: Katz Sports

Scoring summary
1		MICH	Bob Perryman 6-yard run (kick failed)	MICH 6–0
3		MIA	Eddie Brown 32-yard pass from Bernie Kosar (Cox kick)	MIA 7–6
3		MICH	Perryman 3-yard run (run failed)	MICH 12–7
4	7:01	MICH	Perryman 1-yard run (Bergeron kick)	MICH 19–7
4		MIA	Stanley Shakespeare 44-yard pass from Kosar (Cox kick)	MICH 19–14
4		MICH	Bergeron 27-yard field goal	MICH 22–14

On September 8, 1984, Michigan defeated Jimmy Johnson's Miami Hurricanes, the defending national champions who were ranked No. 1 by both the AP and UPI in preseason polls. The Wolverines prevailed by a 22–14 score before a crowd of 105,403 at Michigan Stadium. The victory broke Miami's 13-game winning streak.

Michigan's first scoring drive began when Rodney Lyles forced a Don Oliver fumble and Michigan recovered at its 45-yard line. Quarterback Jim Harbaugh, making his first start for Michigan, led the Wolverines 55 yards down the field with Bob Perryman scoring on six-yard run. Bob Bergeron missed the extra point. Michigan's defense dominated in the first half, holding Miami scoreless, and the Wolverines led 6–0 at halftime.

In the third quarter, Miami quarterback Bernie Kosar threw a 32-yard touchdown pass to Eddie Brown, and Miami took a 7–6 lead. Michigan responded with two drives capped by Perryman touchdowns and led 19–7 with seven minutes remaining in the game. Kosar then connected with Stanley Shakespeare for a 44-yard touchdown pass to cut the lead to five points. On Miami's next possession, Rodney Lyles intercepted a Kosar pass deep in Miami territory, and Bob Bergeron kicked a 27-yard field goal to extend Michigan's lead to eight points. When Miami regained possession for its final drive, Lyles made his third interception of the game.

Michigan intercepted a total of six passes off Kosar (three by Lyles, one each by Doug Mallory, Brad Cochran, and Mike Hammerstein), sacked Kosar five times, and forced two fumbles. Kosar completed 16 of 38 passes for 228 yards. Harbaugh completed 11 of 21 passes for 163 yards. Tailback Gerald White rushed for 89 yards on 27 carries, while Perryman scored three touchdowns and ran for 79 yards. Miami's Alonzo Highsmith was the leading ground-gainer with 126 yards.

=== Washington ===
Week 2: Washington at Michigan

Team	1	2	3	4	Total
• No. 16 Washington	3	7	10	0	20
No. 3 Michigan	0	3	0	8	11

- Date: September 15
- Location: Ann Arbor, MI
- Game attendance: 103,072

Scoring summary
1	UW	Jaeger 24-yard field goal	UW 3–0
2	MICH	Bergeron 52-yard field goal	Tied 3–3
2	UW	Fenney 2-yard run (Jaeger kick)	UW 10–3
3	UW	Pattison 73-yard pass from Hugh Millen (Jaeger kick)	UW 17–3
3	UW	Jaeger 38-yard field goal	UW 20–3
4	MICH	Bean 6-yard pass from Harbaugh (Garrett run)	UW 20–11

On September 15, 1984, Michigan lost to Washington, 20–11, before a crowd of 103,072 at Michigan Stadium in Ann Arbor. In his second start for Michigan, Jim Harbaugh completed 17 of 37 passes for 183 yards and three interceptions. Michigan turned the ball over twice on fumbles.

=== Wisconsin ===
Week 3: Wisconsin at Michigan

Team	1	2	3	4	Total
Wisconsin	0	0	7	7	14
• No. 14 Michigan	3	7	7	3	20

- Date: September 22
- Location: Ann Arbor, MI
- Game attendance: 104,239

Scoring summary
1	MICH	Bob Bergeron 27-yard field goal	MICH 3–0
2	MICH	Sim Nelson 8-yard pass from Jim Harbaugh (Bergeron kick)	MICH 10–0
3	WIS	Emery 52-yard run (Gregorie kick)	MICH 10–7
3	MICH	Bob Perryman 3-yard run (Bergeron kick)	MICH 17–7
4	WIS	Emery 2-yard run (Gregorie kick)	MICH 17–14
4	MICH	Bergeron 50-yard field goal	MICH 20–14

On September 22, 1984, Michigan beat Wisconsin, 20–14, before a crowd of 104,239 at Michigan Stadium. Wisconsin out-gained the Wolverines, 162 yards to nine, in the first quarter, but was unable to score. Michigan led 10–0 at halftime. Six Wisconsin turnovers (five fumbles and an interception) helped Michigan. Wisconsin came back in the second half. A blocked Michigan punt at the Wolverines 14-yard line resulted in the Badgers' final touchdown. Jim Harbaugh completed 11 of 21 passes for 137 yards and a touchdown. Jamie Morris rushed for 138 yards on 28 carries. Wisconsin back Larry Emery rushed for 185 yards on 17 carries. Bob Bergeron kicked two field goals, including a 50-yarder in the fourth quarter.

=== Indiana ===
Week 4: Michigan at Indiana

Team	1	2	3	4	Total
• Michigan	7	0	7	0	14
Indiana	0	0	0	6	6

- Date: September 29
- Location: Bloomington, IN
- Game attendance: 38,729

Scoring summary
1		MICH	Bob Perryman 1-yard run (Bob Bergeron kick)	MICH 7–0
3		MICH	Eddie Garrett 4-yard pass from Jim Harbaugh (Bergeron kick)	MICH 14–0
4	9:05	IND	Steve Bradley 1-yard run (kick failed)	MICH 14–6

On September 29, 1984, Michigan defeated Indiana, 14–6, before a crowd of 38,729 at Memorial Stadium in Bloomington, Indiana. Jamie Morris gained 86 yards on 19 carries. Jim Harbaugh completed 14 of 18 passes for 135 yards.

=== Michigan State ===
Week 5: Michigan State at Michigan

Team	1	2	3	4	Total
• Michigan State	7	6	3	3	19
Michigan	0	7	0	0	7

- Date: October 6
- Location: Ann Arbor, MI
- Game attendance: 105,612

Scoring summary
1		MSU	Butler 1-yard run (Ralf Mojsiejenko kick)	MSU 7–0
2		MSU	Morse 87-yard punt return (Mojsiejenko kick missed)	MSU 13–0
2		MICH	Eddie Garrett 1-yard run (Bob Bergeron kick)	MSU 13–7
3		MSU	Mojsiejenko 30-yard field goal	MSU 16–7
4	5:50	MSU	Mojsiejenko 30-yard field goal	MICH 19–7

On October 6, 1974, Michigan lost to Michigan State, 19–7, before a crowd of 105,612 at Michigan Stadium in Ann Arbor. Bobby Morse returned a punt 87 yards for a touchdown to give the Spartans a 13–0 lead in the second quarter. Michigan quarterback Jim Harbaugh then led the Wolverines down the field on a drive capped by a one-yard Eddie Garret touchdown run. In the third quarter, Harbaugh collided with Spartan linebacker Thomas Tyree as they went after a loose ball. Harbaugh's arm was broken, and he was carried off the field on a stretcher. Harbaugh had completed seven of 14 passes for 101 yards to that point. Russ Rein and Chris Zurbrugg, playing in place of Harbaugh, were unable to move the team effectively and combined for three interceptions.

=== Northwestern ===
Week 6: Northwestern at Michigan

Team	1	2	3	4	Total
Northwestern	0	0	0	0	0
• No. 14 Michigan	7	17	7	0	31

- Date: October 13
- Location: Ann Arbor, MI
- Game attendance: 102,245

Scoring summary
1	4:58	MICH	Eddie Garrett 1-yard run (Bob Bergeron kick)	MICH 7–0
2	12:58	MICH	Bergeron 34-yard field goal	MICH 10–0
2	5:55	MICH	Garrett 2-yard run (Bergeron kick)	MICH 17–0
2	2:38	MICH	Eric Kattus 5-yard pass from Russell Rein (Bergeron kick)	MICH 24–0
4	13:27	MICH	Jamie Morris 5-yard run (Bergeron kick)	MICH 31–0

On October 13, 1984, Michigan defeated Northwestern, 31–0, before a homecoming crowd of 102,245 at Michigan Stadium. The game was played at the same time that Game 5 of the 1984 World Series was being played an hour down the freeway in Detroit, leaving many fans to listen to the baseball game on pocket radios while attending the football game. Alan Trammell hit two home runs for the Tigers, and Rick Rogers gained 139 yards for the Wolverines on 27 carries. Russell Rein started at quarterback for Michigan after Jim Harbaugh broke his arm one week earlier against Michigan State. Rein completed eight of 11 passes for 81 yards, including a five-yard touchdown pass to Eric Kattus. On the opening kickoff of the second half, Jamie Morris returned the kick 80 yards to Northwestern's 20-yard line.

=== Iowa ===
Week 7: Michigan at Iowa

Team	1	2	3	4	Total
Michigan	0	0	0	0	0
• No. 18 Iowa	6	3	3	14	26

- Date: October 20
- Location: Iowa City, IA
- Game start: 11:10 am CDT
- Elapsed time: 3:02
- Game attendance: 66,025
- Game weather: About 55 °F (13 °C), Cloudy, chance of showers, Wind SW 10–15 mph (16–24 km/h)
- Referee: Tom Quinn
- TV announcers (CBS): Brent Musburger, Ara Parseghian

Scoring summary
1	0:24	IOWA	Ronnie Harmon 3-yard run (Tom Nichol kick failed)	IOWA 6–0
2	6:24	IOWA	Nichol 29-yard field goal	IOWA 9–0
3	11:02	IOWA	Nichol 46-yard field goal	IOWA 12–0
4	13:47	IOWA	Owen Gill 10-yard run (Nichol kick)	IOWA 19–0
4	3:47	IOWA	Chuck Long 2-yard run (Nichol kick)	IOWA 26–0

On October 21, 1984, Michigan lost to Iowa, 26-0, before a crowd of 66,025 at Kinnick Stadium in Iowa City. It was the worst loss suffered by Michigan since Bo Schembechler became the head coach in 1969. For Iowa, Owen Gill rushed for 85 yards and Ronnie Harmon for 63, and Chuck Long completed 14 of 20 passes for 146 yards. Michigan was held to 187 yard of total offense, led by 55 rushing yards from Rick Rogers. Russell Rein started at quarterback, completing seven of 13 passes for only 40 yards and two interceptions. He was replaced by Chris Zurbrugg who completed only four of 12 passes for 43 yards win one interception.

=== Illinois ===
Week 8: Illinois at Michigan

Team	1	2	3	4	Total
Illinois	3	7	0	8	18
• Michigan	7	6	10	3	26

- Date: October 27
- Location: Ann Arbor, MI
- Game attendance: 104,916

Scoring summary
1	12:17	MICH	Rick Rogers 2-yard run (Bob Bergeron kick)	MICH 7-0
1	6:12	ILL	White 29-yard field goal	MICH 7-3
2	13:55	MICH	Bergeron 32-yard field goal	MICH 10-3
2	8:35	ILL	Wilson 4-yard run (White kick)	TIE 10-10
2	3:49	MICH	Bergeron 40-yard field goal	MICH 13-10
3	11:01	MICH	Chris Zurbrugg 8-yard run (Bergeron kick)	MICH 20-10
3	2:18	MICH	Bergeron 38-yard field goal	MICH 23-10
4	11:25	MICH	Bergeron 31-yard field goal	MICH 26-10
4	2:01	ILL	Grant 9-yard pass from Jack Trudeau (Boso pass from Trudeau)	MICH 26-18

On October 27, 1984, Michigan defeated a favored Illinois team by a 26-18 score before a crowd of 104,916 at Michigan Stadium.

Chris Zurbrugg, in his first start as Michigan's quarterback, led an option offense in which he rushed for 76 yards and passed for 51. Rick Rogers added 95 rushing yards. Rodney Lyles set up Michigan's first touchdown with an interception on a tip from Kevin Brooks that Lyles returned to Illinois' 13-yard line. Brad Cochran and Mike Mallory also had interceptions, and Mike Hammerstein recovered an Illinois fumble that was caused by a hit from Jim Scarcelli.

Illinois out-gained the Wolverines, 419 yards to 280. Quarterback Jack Trudeau completed 26 of 41 passes for 269 yards, three interceptions and a touchdown. David Williams caught 12 passes for 132 yards, pushing him over 1,000 yards for the season. Fullback Thomas Rooks rushed for 110 yards on 26 carries.

=== Purdue ===
Week 9: Michigan at Purdue

Team	1	2	3	4	Total
Michigan	0	0	7	22	29
• Purdue	7	17	0	7	31

- Date: November 3
- Location: West Lafayette, IN
- Game attendance: 60,159

Scoring summary
1	2:09	PUR	Beery 2-yard pass from Jim Everett (Rendina kick)	PUR 7–0
2	11:29	PUR	Price 6-yard pass from Everett (Rendina kick)	PUR 14–0
2	4:49	PUR	Rendina 22-yard field goal	PUR 17–0
2	0:26	PUR	Medlock 1-yard run (Rendina kick)	PUR 24–0
3	10:53	MICH	Paul Jokisch 15-yard pass from Chris Zurbrugg (Bob Bergeron kick)	PUR 24–7
4	7:07	PUR	Rodney Carter 16-yard run (Rendina kick)	PUR 31–7
4	4:08	MICH	Triando Markray 13-yard pass from Zurbrugg (Bergeron kick)	PUR 31–14
4	3:26	MICH	Vince Bean 15-yard pass from Zurbrugg (Bean pass from Zurbrugg)	PUR 31–22
4	0:03	MICH	Sim Nelson 6-yard pass from Zurbrugg (Bergeron kick)	PUR 31–29

On November 3, 1984, Michigan lost to Purdue, 31–29, before a crowd of 60,159 at Ross–Ade Stadium in West Lafayette, Indiana.

Behind the passing of Jim Everett, Purdue dominated the game early, leading 24-0 at halftime and 31-7 with seven minutes remaining. Everett completed 23 of 32 passes for 290 yards and two touchdowns. Michigan was held to 12 rushing yards and three first downs in the first half. After the game, coach Bo Schembechler described the first half as "our poorest half ever at Michigan."

In the second half, Michigan's defense took hold and the Wolverines outscored the Boilermakers, 29-7. Chris Zurbrugg threw four touchdown passes, including three in the final four minutes and seven seconds. Zurbrugg finished the game completing 21 of 30 passes for 259 yards and four touchdowns.

=== Minnesota ===
Week 10: Minnesota at Michigan

Team	1	2	3	4	Total
Minnesota	7	0	0	0	7
• Michigan	7	7	7	10	31

- Date: November 10
- Location: Ann Arbor, MI
- Game attendance: 101,247

Scoring summary
1	MINN	Gary Couch 25-yard run, lateral from Rickey Foggie (Chip Lohmiller kick)	MINN 7-0
1	MICH	Chris Zurbrugg 3-yard run (Bob Bergeron kick)	MICH 7-0
2	MICH	Nelson 2-yard pass from Zurbrugg (Bergeron kick)	MICH 14-7
3	MICH	Jamie Morris 11-yard run (Bergeron kick)	MICH 21-7
4	MICH	Paul Jokisch 67-yard pass from Vince Bean (Bergeron kick)	MICH 28-7
4	MICH	Bergeron 33-yard field goal	MICH 31-7

On November 10, 1984, Michigan defeated Lou Holtz's Minnesota Golden Gophers, 31–7, before a crowd of 101,247 at Michigan Stadium in Ann Arbor. Jamie Morris led the Wolverines with 125 rushing yards on 14 carries, including a 68-yard run. Chris Zurbrugg also completed seven of ten passes. The highlight of the game was a trick play in which Zurbrugg handed off to Gerald White who then handed the ball to Vince Bean on a reverse, with Bean then passing to Paul Jokisch for a 67-yard touchdown. In the third quarter, Michigan stopped Minnesota on three straight plays from the one-yard line, then drove 99 yards, culminating with an 11-yard touchdown run by Morris. Minnesota quarterback Rickey Foggie led Minnesota with 106 rushing yards and 94 passing yards.

=== Ohio State ===
Week 11: Michigan at Ohio State

Team	1	2	3	4	Total
Wolverines	0	3	3	0	6
• No. 11 Ohio State	7	0	0	14	21

- Date: November 17
- Location: Columbus, OH
- Game start: 12:00 p.m. EST
- Elapsed time: 3:00
- Game attendance: 90,286
- Game weather: Mostly sunny; 38 °F (3 °C); wind 3 mph (4.8 km/h) W
- Referee: Otho Kortz

Scoring summary
1	4:47	OSU	Keith Byars 1-yard run (Spangler kick)	OSU 7-0
2	0:01	MICH	Bob Bergeron 37-yard field goal	OSU 7-3
3	7:55	MICH	Bergeron 45-yard field goal	OSU 7-6
4	6:08	OSU	Byars 2-yard run (Spangler kick)	OSU 14-6
4	4:43	OSU	Byars 2-yard run (Spangler kick)	OSU 21-6

On November 17, 1984, Michigan lost to Ohio State, 21–6, before a crowd of 90,286 at Ohio Stadium in Columbus, Ohio. Keith Byars scored three touchdowns including two in the final six-and-a-half minutes.

=== 1984 Holiday Bowl ===
1984 Holiday Bowl

Team	1	2	3	4	Total
Michigan	0	7	7	3	17
• No. 1 BYU	0	10	0	14	24

- Date: December 21
- Location: San Diego
- Game attendance: 61,243
- Game weather: Clear; 51 °F (11 °C)
- Television network: ESPN

Scoring summary
2	8:37	BYU	Kelly Smith 5-yard run (Johnson kick)	BYU 7–0
2	1:13	MICH	Rick Rogers 5-yard run (Bob Bergeron kick)	Tie 7–7
2		BYU	Johnson 31-yard field goal	BYU 10–7
3		MICH	Bob Perryman 10-yard pass from Chris Zurbrugg (Bergeron kick)	MICH 14–10
4		MICH	Bergeron 32-yard field goal	MICH 17–10
4		BYU	Glen Kozlowski 7-yard pass from Robbie Bosco (Johnson kick)	Tie 17–17
4	1:23	BYU	Kelly Smith 13-yard pass from Bosco (Johnson kick)	BYU 24–17

On December 21, 1984, Michigan lost to No. 1 BYU by a 24–17 score before a crowd of 61,243 in the 1984 Holiday Bowl played at Jack Murphy Stadium in San Diego. With the victory, BYU secured the national championship with a No. 1 ranking in the AP and UPI polls.

Michigan forced six turnovers and led, 17–10, early in the fourth quarter. BYU quarterback Robbie Bosco sustained a knee injury in the first quarter on a play resulting in a roughing the passer penalty against Michigan. Bosco was carried off the field with his leg dangling, but returned in the second quarter with his knee heavily taped. Hobbling noticeably, Bosco led a fourth-quarter comeback, throwing touchdown passes of seven yards to Glen Kozlowski and 13 yards to Kelly Smith. He threw the game-winning touchdown pass to Kelly Smith with 83 seconds remaining in the game.

Bosco completed 30 of 42 passes for 343 yards. BYU back Lakei Heimuli rushed for 82 yards on 16 carries. For Michigan, Bob Perryman rushed for 110 yards on 13 carries, and Chris Zurbrugg completed seven of 15 passes for 82 yards.

=== Awards and honors ===
For the first time since Bo Schembechler took over as Michigan's head coach, no Michigan players were named to the 1984 All-America team. However, seven were recognized by the Associated Press (AP) and/or United Press International (UPI) on the 1984 All-Big Ten Conference football team: linebacker Mike Mallory (AP-1, UPI-1); defensive tackle Kevin Brooks (UPI-1); offensive guard Doug James (AP-2, UPI-2); middle guard Al Sincich (AP-2, UPI-2); tight end Sim Nelson (AP-2); linebacker Rod Lyles (UPI-2); and defensive back Brad Cochran.

Team awards were presented as follows:

- Most Valuable Player: Mike Mallory
- Meyer Morton Award: Jim Harbaugh
- John Maulbetsch Award: Garland Rivers
- Frederick Matthei Award: Tony Gant
- Arthur Robinson Scholarship Award: Mike Hammerstein
- Dick Katcher Award: Clay Miller
- Robert P. Ufer Award: Al Sincich

== Personnel ==
=== Offense ===
- Greg Armstrong, fullback, senior, Ohio
- Art Balourdos, center, senior, Chicago, Illinois – started all 12 games at center
- Vince Bean, split end, senior, Southfield, Michigan – started all 12 games at split end
- Jumbo Elliott, offensive tackle, sophomore, Lake Ronkonkoma, New York – started 10 games at left offensive tackle
- Rick Frazer, offensive line, junior, Escanaba, Michigan
- Eddie Garrett, fullback, junior, Milwaukee – started 6 games at fullback
- John Ghindia, offensive guard, senior, Trenton, Michigan
- Mark Hammerstein, offensive tackle, junior, Wapakoneta, Ohio – started 2 games at left offensive guard, 2 games at left offensive tackle
- Jim Harbaugh, quarterback, junior, Palo Alto, California – started 5 games at quarterback
- Dave Herrick, offensive tackle – defensive tackle, freshman, Indianapolis, Indiana
- Doug James, offensive guard, senior, Louisville, Kentucky – started 9 games at left offensive guard
- Gilvanni Johnson, wide receiver, junior, Detroit, Michigan – started 2 games at flanker
- Steve Johnson, wide receiver, junior, Youngstown, Ohio – started 4 games at flanker
- Paul Jokish, wide receiver, junior, Clarkston, Michigan – started 1 game at flanker
- Eric Kattus, tight end, senior, Cincinnati
- Ben Logue, running back, junior, Atlanta
- Triando Markray side receiver, junior, Detroit – started 5 games at flanker
- Clay Miller, offensive tackle, senior, Norman, Oklahoma – started all 12 games at right offensive tackle
- Jamie Morris, tailback, freshman, Ayer, Massachusetts – started 4 games at tailback
- Sim Nelson, tight end, senior, Fort Wayne, Indiana – started all 12 games at tight end
- Bob Perryman, fullback, junior, Buzzards Bay, Massachusetts – started 6 games at fullback
- Bob Popowski, offensive guard, senior, Chicago – started 1 games at left offensive guard
- Jerry Quaerna, offensive tackle, junior, Janesville, Wisconsin
- Russell Rein, quarterback, sophomore, Oak Lawn, Illinois – started 2 games at quarterback
- Rick Rogers, running back, senior, Inkster, Michigan – started 6 games at tailback
- James Scarcelli, outside linebacker, senior, Warren, Michigan
- Paul Schmerge, tight end, junior, Cincinnati, Ohio
- Tim Schulte, outside linebacker, sophomore, Villa Hills, Kentucky
- Mike Sessa, wide receiver, senior, St. Joseph, Michigan
- Dave Simon, center, senior, Grosse Pointe, Michigan
- Bob Tabachino, offensive guard, senior, Youngstown, Ohio – started all 12 games at right offensive guard
- John Vitale, offensive guard, freshman, Detroit
- Gerald White, running back, sophomore, Titusville, Florida – started 2 games at tailback
- Chris Zurbrugg, quarterback, sophomore, Alliance, Ohio – started 5 games at quarterback

=== Defense ===
- Jeffery Akers, inside linebacker, Lynn, Massachusetts
- Tim Anderson, inside linebacker, senior, Ann Arbor, Michigan – started all 12 games at inside linebacker
- Allen Bishop, defensive back, sophomore, Miami, Florida
- Kevin Brooks, defensive tackle, senior, Detroit, Michigan – started 11 games at defensive tackle
- Erik Campbell, wide receiver, freshman, Gary, Indiana – started 5 games at free safety
- Brad Cochran, defensive back, junior, Royal Oak, Michigan
- Keith E. Cowan, outside linebacker, junior, Pittsburgh, Pennsylvania
- Vincent DeFelice, defensive tackle, senior, Trenton, Michigan
- Tony Gant, defensive back, junior, Fremont, Ohio – started 3 games at free safety
- Joe Gray, middle guard, senior, Detroit, Michigan – started 2 games at middle guard
- Mike Hammerstein, defensive tackle, senior, Wapakoneta, Ohio – started all 12 games at defensive tackle
- Billy Harris, middle guard, sophomore, Xenia, Ohio
- Dieter Heren, defensive back, junior, Fort Wayne, Indiana – started 1 games at strong safety
- Ivan Hicks, defensive back, junior, Pennsauken, New Jersey – started 4 games at strong safety, 1 game at free safety
- Phil Lewandowski, inside linebacker, senior, Solon, Ohio
- Rodney Lyles, outside linebacker, senior, Miami – started all 12 games at outside linebacker
- Doug Mallory, defensive back, sophomore, DeKalb, Illinois – started 7 games at strong safety, 3 games at free safety
- Mike Mallory, inside linebacker, senior, DeKalb, Illinois – started all 12 games at inside linebacker
- Andree McIntyre, inside linebacker, sophomore, Chicago
- Dave Meredith, defensive tackle, senior, Sterling Heights, Michigan – started 1 games at defensive tackle
- Mark Messner, defensive line, freshman, Milford, Michigan
- Andy Moeller, inside linebacker, junior, Ann Arbor, Michigan
- Greg Randall, defensive back, junior, Chagrin Falls, Ohio
- Mike Reinhold, inside linebacker, junior, Muskegon, Michigan
- Garland Rivers, defensive back, sophomore, Canton, Ohio – started all 12 games at strong side cornerback
- Nathaniel "Nate" Rodgers, middle guard, senior, Warren, Ohio – started 2 games at middle guard
- James Scarcelli – started 12 games at outside linebacker
- Alan Sincich, middle guard, senior, Cleveland, Ohio – started 8 games at middle guard
- Steven Thibert, outside linebacker, sophomore, Union Lake, Michigan

=== Kicking ===
- Bob Bergeron, place-kicker, senior, Fort Wayne, Indiana
- Mike Melnyk, place-kicker, senior, Warren, Michigan
- Monte Robbins, punter, sophomore, Great Bend, Kansas
- Todd Schlopy place-kicker, senior, Orchard Park, New York

=== Coaching staff ===
- Head coach: Bo Schembechler
- Assistant coaches: Alex Agase, Tirrel Burton, Lloyd Carr, Jerry Hanlon, Jerry Meter, Gary Moeller, Paul Schudel, Bob Thornbladh, Elliot Uzelac, Milan Vooletich
- Trainer: Russ Miller
- Managers: Paul Ghekas, Michael Drews, Gregory Moriartey, Kenneth Perkins

== Statistical leaders ==
=== Rushing ===
Player	Att	Net Yards	Yds/Att	TD
Jamie Morris	118	573	4.9	2
Rick Rogers	139	527	3.8	2
Bob Perryman	76	393	5.2	5
Gerald White	91	345	3.8	0
Eddie Garrett	53	173	3.3	3

=== Passing ===
Player	Att	Comp	Int	Comp %	Yds	Yds/Comp	TD
Jim Harbaugh	111	60	5	54.1	718	12.0	3
Chris Zurbrugg	113	63	7	55.8	691	11.0	6
Russ Rein	31	17	3	54.8	142	8.4	1
Vince Bean	1	1	0	100.0	67	67.0	1

=== Receiving ===
Player	Recp	Yds	Yds/Recp	TD
Sim Nelson	40	459	11.5	3
Vince Bean	29	445	15.3	2
Paul Jokisch	10	178	17.8	2
Jamie Morris	14	131	9.4	0
Triando Markray	9	120	13.3	1

=== Scoring ===
Player	TDs	XPM	FGM	Points
Bob Bergeron	0	21	13	60
Bob Perryman	6	0	0	36
Eddie Garrett	4	0	0	24
Sim Nelson	3	0	0	18
5 players with 2 TDs	2	0	0	12
