= 1984 Michigan State Spartans football team =

American college football season

1984 Michigan State Spartans football

Cherry Bowl, L 6–10 vs. Army
- Conference: Big Ten Conference
- Record: 6–6 (5–4 Big Ten)
- Head coach: George Perles (2nd season)
- Defensive coordinator: Nick Saban (2nd season)
- MVP: Jim Morrissey
- Captain: Jim Morrissey
- Home stadium: Spartan Stadium

1984 Big Ten Conference football standings
	Conf.					Overall
Team	W		L		T	W		L		T
No. 13 Ohio State $	7	–	2	–	0	9	–	3	–	0
Illinois	6	–	3	–	0	7	–	4	–	0
Purdue	6	–	3	–	0	7	–	5	–	0
No. 16 Iowa	5	–	3	–	1	8	–	4	–	1
Wisconsin	5	–	3	–	1	7	–	4	–	1
Michigan State	5	–	4	–	0	6	–	6	–	0
Michigan	5	–	4	–	0	6	–	6	–	0
Minnesota	3	–	6	–	0	4	–	7	–	0
Northwestern	2	–	7	–	0	2	–	9	–	0
Indiana	0	–	9	–	0	0	–	11	–	0
$ – Conference champion; Rankings from AP Poll

The 1984 Michigan State Spartans football team was an American football team that represented Michigan State University as a member of the Big Ten Conference during the 1984 Big Ten football season. In their second season under head coach George Perles, the Spartans compiled a 6–6 record (5–4 in conference games), tied for sixth place in the Big Ten, and were outscored by a total of 193 to 187. In three games against ranked opponents, they defeated No. 13 Michigan and No. 18 Iowa, but lost to No. 8 Ohio State. The Spartans played in the program's first bowl game since 1965, losing to Army in the 1984 Cherry Bowl.

On offense, the Spartans gained an average of 141.5 rushing yards and 123.9 passing yards per game. On defense, and with Nick Saban in his second season as the Spartans' defensive coordinator, they held opponents to an average of 115.7 rushing yards and 212.9 passing yards per game. The team's individual leaders included quarterback Dave Yarema with 1,322 passing yards, Carl Butler with 581 rushing yards, wide receiver Mark Ingram Sr. with 21 receptions and 479 receiving yards, and kicker Ralf Mojsiejenko with 45 points scored (10 of 14 field goals, 15 of 20 extra points).

Six Spartans were recognized by the Associated Press (AP) and/or the United Press International (UPI) on the 1984 All-Big Ten Conference football team: linebacker Jim Morrissey (AP-2; UPI-1); defensive back Phil Parker (UPI-1); running back Carl Butler (UPI-2); center Mark Napolitan (AP-2); defensive lineman Kelly Quinn (AP-2; UPI-2); and placekicker and punter Ralf Mojsienenko (AP-2; UPI-2). Linebacker Jim Morrissey was the team captain and was also selected as the team's most valuable player.

The team played its home games at Spartan Stadium in East Lansing, Michigan.

== Schedule ==
Date	Opponent	Site	Result	Attendance	Source
September 8	at Colorado*	Folsom Field; Boulder, CO	W 24–21	35,825	
September 15	Notre Dame*	Spartan Stadium; East Lansing, MI (rivalry)	L 20–24	76,919	
September 22	at Illinois	Memorial Stadium; Champaign, IL	L 7–40	75,762	
September 29	Purdue	Spartan Stadium; East Lansing, MI	L 10–13	64,819	
October 6	at No. 13 Michigan	Michigan Stadium; Ann Arbor, MI (rivalry)	W 19–7	105,612	
October 13	Indiana^{†}	Spartan Stadium; East Lansing, MI (rivalry)	W 13–6	63,890	
October 20	No. 8 Ohio State	Spartan Stadium; East Lansing, MI	L 20–23	75,133	
October 27	at Minnesota	Hubert H. Humphrey Metrodome; Minneapolis, MN	W 20–13	47,427	
November 3	Northwestern	Spartan Stadium; East Lansing, MI	W 27–10	63,619	
November 10	at No. 18 Iowa	Kinnick Stadium; Iowa City, IA	W 17–16	65,887	
November 17	Wisconsin	Spartan Stadium; East Lansing, MI	L 10–20	61,702	
December 22	vs. Army*	Pontiac Silverdome; Pontiac, MI (Cherry Bowl)	L 6–10	70,332	
*Non-conference game; ^{†}Homecoming; Rankings from AP Poll released prior to the game

== Game summaries ==
=== Notre Dame ===
Team	1	2	3	4	Total
• Fighting Irish	0	3	7	14	24
Spartans	17	0	3	0	20

- Date: September 15
- Location: Spartan Stadium, East Lansing, Michigan
- Game attendance: 76,919

Scoring summary
Q1	MSU	Butler 15 yard run (kick failed)	MSU 6–0
Q1	MSU	Butler 23 yard run (Ingram pass from Yarema)	MSU 14–0
Q1	MSU	Mojsiejenko 24 yard field goal	MSU 17–0
Q2	ND	Carney 42 yard field goal	MSU 17–3
Q3	ND	Pinkett 40 yard pass from Beuerlein (Carney kick)	MSU 17–10
Q3	MSU	Mojsiejenko 43 yard field goal	MSU 20–10
Q4	ND	Jackson 8 yard pass from Beuerlein (Carney kick)	MSU 20–17
Q4	ND	Pinkett 5 yard run (Carney kick)	ND 24–20

=== At Michigan ===
Team	1	2	3	4	Total
• Spartans	7	6	3	3	19
Wolverines	0	7	0	0	7

- Date: October 6
- Location: Michigan Stadium
- Game attendance: 105,612

Scoring summary
Q1	MSU	Butler 1 yard run (Mojsiejenko kick)	MSU 7–0
Q2	MSU	Morse 87 yard punt return (kick failed)	MSU 13–0
Q2	MICH	Garrett 1 yard run (Bergeron kick)	MSU 13–7
Q3	MSU	Mojsiejenko 49 yard field goal	MSU 16–7
Q4	MSU	Mojsiejenko 30 yard field goal	MSU 19–7

=== Ohio State ===
Team	1	2	3	4	Total
• Buckeyes	3	6	7	7	23
Spartans	0	0	6	14	20

- Date: October 20
- Location: Spartan Stadium
- Game start: 1:00 p.m. EDT
- Elapsed time: 2:45
- Game attendance: 75,133
- Game weather: Cloudy; 55 °F (13 °C); wind 12–17 mph (19–27 km/h) S
- Referee: John Nealon

Scoring summary
Q1	2:14	OHST	Spangler 36 yard field goal	OHST 3–0
Q2	2:23	OHST	Spangler 42 yard field goal	OHST 6–0
Q2	0:10	OHST	Spangler 30 yard field goal	OHST 9–0
Q3	14:13	OHST	Byars 1 yard run (Spangler kick)	OHST 16–0
Q3	9:03	MSU	Morse 2 yard pass from Yarema (kick failed)	OHST 16–6
Q4	11:40	MSU	Ingram 75 yard pass from Yarema (pass failed)	OHST 16–12
Q4	4:44	OHST	Tomczak 1 yard run (Spangler kick)	OHST 23–12
Q4	4:32	MSU	Jackson 93 yard kickoff return (Rolle pass from Yarema)	OHST 23–20

=== At Iowa ===
Michigan State at #18 Iowa

Team	1	2	3	4	Total
• Spartans	7	7	3	0	17
Hawkeyes	3	0	0	13	16

- Date: November 10
- Location: Kinnick Stadium, Iowa City, Iowa
- Game start: 1:10 p.m. CST
- Elapsed time: 3:00
- Game attendance: 65,887
- Game weather: ~42 °F (6 °C), cloudy, possible rain and snow, Wind N 10–20 mph (16–32 km/h)
- Referee: Otho Kortz

Scoring summary
Q1	7:29	IOWA	Nichol 24-yard field goal	IOWA 3–0
Q1	1:55	MSU	L. White 2-yard run (Mojsiejenko kick)	MSU 7–3
Q2	5:20	MSU	Rolle 7-yard pass from Yarema (Mojsiejenko kick)	MSU 14–3
Q3	2:23	MSU	Mojsiejenko 24-yard field goal	MSU 17–3
Q4	9:18	IOWA	O. Gill 2-yard run (Nichol kick)	MSU 17-10
Q4	0:44	IOWA	Hayes 3-yard pass from Long (Long run failed)	MSU 17–16

=== Vs. Army (Cherry Bowl) ===
Team	1	2	3	4	Total
• Cadets	0	7	0	3	10
Spartans	0	0	0	6	6

- Date: December 22
- Location: Pontiac Silverdome, Pontiac, Michigan
- Game attendance: 70,336
- Game weather: Indoors

Scoring summary
2	6:31	ARMY	Clarence Jones 4-yard run (Stopa kick)	ARMY 7–0
4	8:40	ARMY	Craig Stopa 38-yard field goal	ARMY 10–0
4	4:19	MSU	Bob Wasczenski 36-yard pass from Yarema (pass failed)	ARMY 10–6

== Personnel ==
1984 Michigan State Spartans football team roster
Players
Coaches
Offense

Pos.	#	Name	Class
TE	95	Veno Belk	Jr
WR	11	Mark Ingram	So
C	60	Pat Shurmur	Fr
RB	34	Lorenzo White	Fr
OT	73	John Wojciechowski	Jr
QB	14	Dave Yarema	So

Defense

Pos.	#	Name	Class
LB	51	Anthony Bell	Jr
LB	41	Shane Bullough	So
LB	40	Jim Morrissey	Sr
S	32	Phil Parker	Jr
DE	93	Kelly Quinn	Jr
CB	36	Lonnie Young	Sr

Special teams

Pos.	#	Name	Class
P/K	2	Ralf Mojsiejenko	Sr
P	23	Greg Montgomery	Fr

Head coach

- George Perles

Coordinators/assistant coaches

Legend

- (C) Team captain
- (S) Suspended
- (I) Ineligible
- Injured
- Redshirt
