= 1984 Iowa Hawkeyes football team =

American college football season

1984 Iowa Hawkeyes football

Freedom Bowl champion

Freedom Bowl, W 55–17 vs. Texas
- Conference: Big Ten Conference

Ranking
- Coaches: No. 15
- AP: No. 16
- Record: 8–4–1 (5–3–1 Big Ten)
- Head coach: Hayden Fry (6th season)
- Offensive coordinator: Bill Snyder (6th season)
- Offensive scheme: Pro-style
- Defensive coordinator: Bill Brashier (6th season)
- Base defense: 5–2
- MVP: Ronnie Harmon
- Captains: Owen Gill; Jonathan Hayes; Paul Hufford; Keith Hunter; Kevin Spitzig
- Home stadium: Kinnick Stadium

1984 Big Ten Conference football standings
	Conf.					Overall
Team	W		L		T	W		L		T
No. 13 Ohio State $	7	–	2	–	0	9	–	3	–	0
Illinois	6	–	3	–	0	7	–	4	–	0
Purdue	6	–	3	–	0	7	–	5	–	0
No. 16 Iowa	5	–	3	–	1	8	–	4	–	1
Wisconsin	5	–	3	–	1	7	–	4	–	1
Michigan State	5	–	4	–	0	6	–	6	–	0
Michigan	5	–	4	–	0	6	–	6	–	0
Minnesota	3	–	6	–	0	4	–	7	–	0
Northwestern	2	–	7	–	0	2	–	9	–	0
Indiana	0	–	9	–	0	0	–	11	–	0
$ – Conference champion; Rankings from AP Poll

The 1984 Iowa Hawkeyes football team was an American football team that represented the University of Iowa as a member of the Big Ten Conference during the 1984 Big Ten football season. In their sixth year under head coach Hayden Fry, the Hawkeyes compiled an 8–4–1 record (5–3–1 in conference games), tied for fourth place in the Big Ten, and outscored opponents by a total of 304 to 184. After a 59–21 victory over Iowa State in the season opener, they were ranked No. 5 in the AP poll, but dropped out of the poll after losing No. 12 Penn State and No. 5 Ohio State in consecutive games. They concluded their season with a 55–17 victory over No. 19 Texas in the Freedom Bowl and were ranked No. 16 in the final AP poll and No. 15 in the final UPI poll.

Key players included: linebacker Larry Station who was a consensus first-team All-American; running back Ronnie Harmon who was selected as the team's most valuable player; and defensive tackle Paul Hufford who was selected as the Big Ten Defensive Lineman of the Year. Seven Iowa players, including Station, Harmon, Hufford, and quarterback Chuck Long received first-team honors on the 1984 All-Big Ten Conference football team.

The team played its home games at Kinnick Stadium in Iowa City, Iowa.

== Schedule ==
Date	Opponent	Rank	Site	TV	Result	Attendance	Source
September 8	Iowa State*	No. 10	Kinnick Stadium; Iowa City, IA (rivalry)	IPTV	W 59–21	66,150	
September 15	No. 12 Penn State*	No. 5	Kinnick Stadium; Iowa City, IA		L 17–20	66,145	
September 22	at No. 5 Ohio State	No. 14	Ohio Stadium; Columbus, OH	SV	L 26–45	89,733	
September 29	Illinois^{†}		Kinnick Stadium; Iowa City, IA	CBS	W 21–16	66,322	
October 6	at Northwestern		Dyche Stadium; Evanston, IL		W 31–3	36,598	
October 13	at No. 14 Purdue		Ross–Ade Stadium; West Lafayette, IN		W 40–3	66,359	
October 20	Michigan	No. 18	Kinnick Stadium; Iowa City, IA	CBS	W 26–0	66,025	
October 27	at Indiana	No. 17	Memorial Stadium; Bloomington, IN		W 24–20	37,747	
November 3	Wisconsin	No. 17	Kinnick Stadium; Iowa City, IA (rivalry)	CBS	T 10–10	66,255	
November 10	Michigan State	No. 18	Kinnick Stadium; Iowa City, IA		L 16–17	65,887	
November 17	at Minnesota		Hubert H. Humphrey Metrodome; Minneapolis, MN (rivalry)		L 17–23	63,479	
December 1	at Hawaii*		Aloha Stadium; Halawa, HI		W 17–6	50,000	
December 26	vs. No. 19 Texas*		Anaheim Stadium; Anaheim, CA (Freedom Bowl)	Mizlou	W 55–17	24,093	
*Non-conference game; ^{†}Homecoming; Rankings from AP Poll released prior to the game; Source:

== Rankings ==
Ranking movements Legend: ██ Increase in ranking ██ Decrease in ranking — = Not ranked ( ) = First-place votes
	Week															
Poll	Pre	1	2	3	4	5	6	7	8	9	10	11	12	13	14	Final
AP	12 (1)	10 (1)	5 (2)	14	—	—	—	18	17	17	18	—	—	—	—	16
Coaches	14	14	5	15	20	20	19	17	17	13	17	—	—	—	—	15

== Game summaries ==
=== Iowa State ===
Iowa State at #10 Iowa

Team	1	2	3	4	Total
Cyclones	0	7	0	14	21
• Hawkeyes	14	28	10	7	59

- Date: September 8
- Location: Kinnick Stadium, Iowa City, Iowa
- Game start: 12:05 p.m. EDT
- Elapsed time: 3:30
- Game attendance: 66,150
- Game weather: 78 °F (26 °C), Showers possible, Wind SW 10–20 mph (16–32 km/h)
- Referee: Tom Quinn
- Television network: IPTV
- Source: Box Score and Game Recap, Box Score and Game Recap

Scoring summary
Q1		IOWA	Strobel 38-yard interception return (Nichol kick)	IOWA 7–0
Q1		IOWA	Happel 15-yard pass from Long (Nichol kick)	IOWA 14–0
Q2		IOWA	Smith 63-yard pass from Long (Nichol kick)	IOWA 21–0
Q2		IOWA	Hayes 3-yard pass from Long (Nichol kick)	IOWA 28–0
Q2		IOWA	O. Gill 3-yard run (Nichol kick)	IOWA 35–0
Q2		ISU	Davis 1-yard pass from Espinoza (Bochrodt kick)	IOWA 35–7
Q2		IOWA	R. Harmon 86-yard run (Nichol kick)	IOWA 42–7
Q3		IOWA	R. Harmon 68-yard pass from Long (Nichol kick)	IOWA 49–7
Q3		IOWA	T. Nichol 37-yard field goal	IOWA 52–7
Q4		ISU	Henderson 45-yard pass from Espinoza (Bochrodt kick)	IOWA 52–14
Q4	6:55	IOWA	Cotton 18-yard pass from K. Hatinon (Nichol kick)	IOWA 59–14
Q4		ISU	Hanson 12-yard pass from Espinoza (Bochrodt kick)	IOWA 59–21

=== No. 12 Penn State ===
#12 Penn State at #5 Iowa

Team	1	2	3	4	Total
• No. 12 Nittany Lions	0	13	0	7	20
No. 5 Hawkeyes	3	7	0	7	17

- Date: September 15
- Location: Kinnick Stadium, Iowa City, Iowa
- Game attendance: 66,145
- Source: Box score and Game story, Box Score and Game Recap

Scoring summary
Q1	IOWA	Nichol 24-yard field goal	IOWA 3–0
Q2	PSU	Gancitano 21-yard field goal	Tied 3–3
Q2	PSU	Gancitano 35-yard field goal	PSU 6–3
Q2	PSU	Bellamy 24-yard pass from Strang (Gancitano kick)	PSU 13–3
Q2	IOWA	R. Harmon 15-yard run (Nichol kick)	PSU 13–10
Q4	PSU	Strang 1-yard run (Gancitano kick)	PSU 20–10
Q4	IOWA	Long 1-yard run (Nichol kick)	PSU 20–17

=== at No. 5 Ohio State ===
#14 Iowa at #5 Ohio State

Team	1	2	3	4	Total
No. 14 Hawkeyes	3	17	6	0	26
• No. 5 Buckeyes	10	21	7	7	45

- Date: September 22
- Location: Ohio Stadium, Columbus, Ohio
- Game attendance: 89,733
- Game weather: 85 °F (29 °C), Clear and sunny, Wind S 10–15 mph (16–24 km/h)
- Referee: Jim Kemerling
- Television network: SV
- Source: Box score and Game story, Box Score Archived 2015-11-24 at the Wayback Machine

Scoring summary
Q1	6:10	OSU	Spangler 23-yard field goal	OSU 3–0
Q1	2:33	IOWA	Tom Nichol 30-yard field goal	Tied 3–3
Q1	2:13	OSU	K. Byars 50-yard run (Spangler kick)	OSU 10–3
Q2	13:43	IOWA	Jordan 27-yard pass from Chuck Long (Nichol kick)	Tied 10–10
Q2	9:07	OSU	K. Byars 14-yard pass from M. Tomczak (Spangler kick)	OSU 17–10
Q2	8:20	OSU	Kolic 25-yard interception return (Spangler kick)	OSU 24–10
Q2	7:41	OSU	Lanese 35-yard pass from K. Byars (Spangler kick)	OSU 31–10
Q2	2:49	IOWA	Flagg 30-yard pass from Chuck Long (Nichol kick)	OSU 31–17
Q2	0:08	IOWA	Tom Nichol 41-yard field goal	OSU 31–20
Q3	4:56	IOWA	Chuck Long 2-yard run (two-point conversion failed)	OSU 31–26
Q3	1:23	OSU	K. Byars 7-yard run (Spangler kick)	OSU 38–26
Q4	1:39	OSU	Lanese 6-yard run (Spangler kick)	OSU 45–26

The Hawkeyes outgained the Buckeyes 458–335, but four turnovers (one returned for a touchdown) were too much to overcome on this trip to Columbus. Keith Byars ran, caught, and threw touchdowns for Ohio State.

=== Illinois ===
Illinois at Iowa

Team	1	2	3	4	Total
Fighting Illini	3	0	0	13	16
• Hawkeyes	7	0	7	7	21

- Date: September 29
- Location: Kinnick Stadium, Iowa City, Iowa
- Game attendance: 66,322
- Game weather: 45 °F (7 °C), Sunny, Wind W 10 mph (16 km/h)
- TV announcers (CBS): Brent Musburger and Ara Parseghian
- Source: Box score and Game story

Scoring summary
Q1	IOWA	R. Harmon 2-yard run (Nichol kick)	IOWA 7–0
Q1	ILL	C. White 36-yard field goal	IOWA 7–3
Q3	IOWA	R. Harmon 8-yard run (Nichol kick)	IOWA 14–3
Q4	ILL	NAME 8-yard pass from Trudeau (two-point conversion failed)	IOWA 14–9
Q4	IOWA	R. Harmon 12-yard run (Nichol kick)	IOWA 21–9
Q4	ILL	Grant 4-yard pass from Trudeau (White kick)	IOWA 21–16

The Hawkeyes exacted some revenge for the whipping laid on them in Champaign the previous season. The win over the defending Big Ten champions snapped the Illini's 12-game conference winning streak. Ronnie Harmon had 3 touchdown runs for Iowa.

=== At Northwestern ===
Iowa at Northwestern

Team	1	2	3	4	Total
• Hawkeyes	14	10	0	7	31
Wildcats	0	3	0	0	3

- Date: October 6
- Location: Dyche Stadium, Evanston, Illinois
- Game attendance: 36,598
- Sources: Box Score and Game story

Scoring summary
1	IOWA	R. Harmon 2-yard run (Nichol kick)	IOWA 7-0
1	IOWA	R. Harmon 9-yard run (Nichol kick)	IOWA 14-0
2	IOWA	R. Harmon 17-yard run (Nichol kick)	IOWA 21-0
2	NW	J. Duvic 49-yard field goal	IOWA 21-3
2	IOWA	T. Nichol 28-yard field goal	IOWA 24-3
4	IOWA	S. Helverson 6-yard pass from Chuck Long (NIchol kick)	IOWA 31-3

The Hawkeyes held Northwestern to only 49 yards of total offense, a mark that still stands as a single-game school record. Ronnie Harmon recorded 3 touchdown runs for the second straight game.

=== at No. 14 Purdue ===
Iowa at #14 Purdue

Team	1	2	3	4	Total
• Hawkeyes	6	13	21	0	40
No. 14 Boilermakers	3	0	0	0	3

- Date: October 13
- Location: Ross–Ade Stadium, West Lafayette, Indiana
- Game attendance: 66,359
- Game weather: 66 °F (19 °C), Cloudy with scattered showers, Wind SSW 12 mph (19 km/h)
- Referee: Jim Kemerling
- Sources: Box Score and Game story

Scoring summary
Q1	3:52	IOWA	Smith 51-yard pass from Long (kick failed)	IOWA 6–0
Q1	0:48	PUR	Rendina 32-yard field goal	IOWA 6–3
Q2	9:00	IOWA	Nichol 22-yard field goal	IOWA 9–3
Q2	3:03	IOWA	Helverson 56-yard pass from Long (Nichol kick)	IOWA 16–3
Q2	0:03	IOWA	Nichol 38-yard field goal	IOWA 19–3
Q3	7:49	IOWA	Smith 31-yard pass from Long (Nichol kick)	IOWA 26–3
Q3	4:20	IOWA	Smith 38-yard pass from Long (Nichol kick)	IOWA 33–3
Q3	3:31	IOWA	Harmon 3-yard run (Nichol kick)	IOWA 40–3

Chuck Long went 17-21 for 369 yards and 4 TD as Iowa won in West Lafayette for the first time since 1956, snapping a 12-game losing skid at Ross–Ade Stadium.

=== Michigan ===
Michigan at #18 Iowa

Team	1	2	3	4	Total
Wolverines	0	0	0	0	0
• No. 18 Hawkeyes	6	3	3	14	26

- Date: October 20
- Location: Kinnick Stadium, Iowa City, Iowa
- Game start: 11:10 am CDT
- Elapsed time: 3:02
- Game attendance: 66,025
- Game weather: ~55 °F (13 °C), Cloudy, chance of showers, Wind SW 10–15 mph (16–24 km/h)
- Referee: Tom Quinn
- TV announcers (CBS): Brent Musburger and Ara Parseghian
- Sources: Box Score and Game story

Scoring summary
Q1	0:24	IOWA	R. Harmon 3-yard run (Nichol kick failed)	IOWA 6–0
Q2	6:24	IOWA	Tom Nichol 29-yard field goal	IOWA 9–0
Q3	11:02	IOWA	Tom Nichol 46-yard field goal	IOWA 12–0
Q4	13:47	IOWA	O. Gill 10-yard run (Nichol kick)	IOWA 19–0
Q4	3:47	IOWA	Chuck Long 2-yard run (Nichol kick)	IOWA 26–0

The Hawkeyes' 26–0 shutout of the Wolverines would end up being Bo Schembechler's worst loss in 21 years as head coach at Michigan.

=== At Indiana ===
#17 Iowa at Indiana

Team	1	2	3	4	Total
• No. 17 Hawkeyes	7	7	10	0	24
Hoosiers	7	7	0	6	20

- Date: October 27
- Location: Memorial Stadium (Indiana), Bloomington, Indiana
- Game attendance: 37,747
- Source: Box Score and Game Story

Scoring summary
Q1	IOWA	R. Harmon 35-yard run (Nichol kick)	IOWA 7–0
Q1	IND	Lilja 2-yard pass from Bradley (Rogers kick)	Tied 7–7
Q2	IOWA	Hayes 5-yard pass from Long (Nichol kick)	IOWA 14–7
Q2	IND	Kenebrew 10-yard pass from Bradley (Rogers kick)	Tied 14–14
Q3	IOWA	Happel 16-yard pass from Long (Nichol kick)	IOWA 21–14
Q3	IOWA	Nichol 36-yard field goal	IOWA 24–14
Q4	IND	Cook 7-yard pass from Bradley (pass failed)	IOWA 24–20

Chuck Long set an NCAA record by completing 22 consecutive passes (record stood until 1998) and tossed two touchdowns, and Ronnie Harmon ran for 160 yards and a touchdown in the victory over Indiana. Iowa sat atop the Big Ten standings after beating the Hoosiers, but would not win another conference game in 1984.

=== Wisconsin ===
Wisconsin at #17 Iowa

Team	1	2	3	4	Total
Badgers	10	0	0	0	10
No. 17 Hawkeyes	0	0	3	7	10

- Date: November 3
- Location: Kinnick Stadium, Iowa City, Iowa
- Game start: 11:10 a.m. EST
- Elapsed time: 3:10
- Game attendance: 66,255
- Game weather: ~55 °F (13 °C), Clear and sunny, Wind SSW 15–20 mph (24–32 km/h)
- Referee: Jim Kemerling
- Source: Box Score and Game Story

Scoring summary
Q1	8:59	WIS	Gregoire 25-yard field goal	WIS 3–0
Q1	6:41	WIS	Harrison 1-yard run (Gregoire kick)	WIS 10–0
Q3	8:00	IOWA	Nichol 26-yard field goal	WIS 10–3
Q4	11:54	IOWA	Long 1-yard run (Nichol kick)	TIE 10–10

=== Michigan State ===
Michigan State at #18 Iowa

Team	1	2	3	4	Total
• Spartans	7	7	3	0	17
No. 18 Hawkeyes	3	0	0	13	16

- Date: November 10
- Location: Kinnick Stadium, Iowa City, Iowa
- Game start: 1:10 p.m. CST
- Elapsed time: 3:00
- Game attendance: 65,887
- Game weather: ~42 °F (6 °C), Cloudy, possible rain and snow, Wind N 10–20 mph (16–32 km/h)
- Referee: Otho Kortz
- Source: Box Score and Game Story

Scoring summary
Q1	7:29	IOWA	Nichol 24-yard field goal	IOWA 3–0
Q1	1:55	MSU	L. White 2-yard run (Mojsiejenko kick)	MSU 7–3
Q2	5:20	MSU	Rolle 7-yard pass from Yarema (Mojsiejenko kick)	MSU 14–3
Q3	2:23	MSU	Mojsiejenko 24-yard field goal	MSU 17–3
Q4	9:18	IOWA	O. Gill 2-yard run (Nichol kick)	MSU 17-10
Q4	0:44	IOWA	Hayes 3-yard pass from Long (Long run failed)	MSU 17–16

=== At Minnesota ===
Iowa at Minnesota

Team	1	2	3	4	Total
Hawkeyes	0	7	7	3	17
• Golden Gophers	0	7	3	13	23

- Date: November 22
- Location: Hubert H. Humphrey Metrodome, Minneapolis
- Game start: 7:10 p.m. CST
- Elapsed time: 2:54
- Game attendance: 63,479
- Game weather: Indoors
- Referee: Jerry Hendrickson
- Source: Box Score and Game Story

Scoring summary
Q2	14:55	IOWA	O. Gill 11-yard run (Nichol kick)	IOWA 7–0
Q2	5:00	MINN	Starks 1-yard pass from Foggie (Lohmiller kick)	Tied 7–7
Q3	13:00	IOWA	Bill Happel 95-yard punt return (Nichol kick)	IOWA 14–7
Q3	0:57	MINN	Lohmiller 40-yard field goal	IOWA 14–10
Q4	12:59	MINN	Lohmiller 36-yard field goal	IOWA 14–13
Q4	6:25	IOWA	Tom Nichol 25-yard field goal	IOWA 17–13
Q4	4:17	MINN	Gary Couch 14-yard run (Lohmiller kick)	MINN 20–17
Q4	0:56	MINN	Lohmiller 34-yard field goal	MINN 23–17

=== At Hawaii ===
Iowa at Hawaii

Team	1	2	3	4	Total
• Hawkeyes	3	0	0	14	17
Rainbow Warriors	0	6	0	0	6

- Date: December 1
- Location: Aloha Stadium, Honolulu, HI
- Game attendance: 50,000
- Source: Box Score and Game Story

Scoring summary
Q1		IOWA	Nichol 41-yard field goal	IOWA 3–0
Q2		HAW	Spelman 24-yard field goal	Tied 3-3
Q2		HAW	Spelman 42-yard field goal	HAWAII 6-3
Q4		IOWA	Hayes 3-yard pass from Long (Nichol kick)	IOWA 10–6
Q4	2:31	IOWA	Helverson 8-yard pass from Long (Nichol kick)	IOWA 17–6

=== vs. No. 19 Texas (Freedom Bowl) ===
#19 Texas vs. Iowa

Team	1	2	3	4	Total
No. 19 Longhorns	0	17	0	0	17
• Hawkeyes	14	10	31	0	55

- Date: December 26
- Location: Anaheim Stadium, Anaheim, California
- Game start: 5:26 pm PST
- Elapsed time: 3:13
- Game attendance: 24,093
- Game weather: 55 °F (13 °C), Rain
- Referee: Jack Gatto
- TV announcers (Mizlou): Sam Nover and Jack Snow
- Source: Box Score Archived 2019-08-08 at the Wayback Machine

Scoring summary
1	9:15	IOWA	Hayes 6-yard pass from Long (Nichol kick)	IOWA 7–0
1	3:27	Iowa	Flagg 11-yard pass from Long (Nichol kick)	IOWA 14–0
2	13:35	Texas	Bryant 11-yard pass from Dodge (Ward kick)	IOWA 14–7
2	10:14	IOWA	Bush 1-yard run (Nichol kick)	IOWA 21–7
2	5:34	Texas	Harris 1-yard pass from Dodge (Ward kick)	IOWA 21–14
2	2:23	Texas	Ward 46-yard FG	IOWA 21–17
2	0:00	IOWA	Nichol 27-yard FG	IOWA 24–17
3	13:03	IOWA	Nichol 35-yard FG	IOWA 27–17
3	12:05	IOWA	Happel 33-yard pass from Long (Nichol kick)	IOWA 34–17
3	7:09	IOWA	Smith 49-yard pass from Long (Nichol kick)	IOWA 41–17
3	4:53	IOWA	Helverson 4-yard pass from Long (Nichol kick)	IOWA 48–17
3	2:19	IOWA	Hayes 15-yard pass from Long (Nichol kick)	IOWA 55–17

Chuck Long 29–39, 461 yards, 6 TD

	Texas	Iowa
First downs	15	28
Rushing yards	35-115	41-91
Passing	17-34-2	30-40-0
Passing yards	185	469
Total Offense	300	560
Fumbles Lost	3-3	5-2
Punts-Average	5-43.0	4-42.0
Penalties	6-50	4-27

Team	Category	Player	Statistics
Texas	Passing	Todd Dodge	16/32, 180 yards, 2 TD, 2 INT
Texas	Rushing	Orr	12 carries, 67 yards
Texas	Receiving	Bryant	3 receptions, 50 yards, TD
Iowa	Passing	Chuck Long	29/39, 461 yards, 6 TD
Iowa	Rushing	Owen Gill	17 carries, 61 yards
Iowa	Receiving	Robert Smith; Bill Happel	4 receptions, 115 yards, TD; 8 receptions, 104 yards, TD

== Roster ==
1984 Iowa Hawkeyes football team roster
Players
Coaches
Offense

Pos.	#	Name	Class
OL	55	Dave Alexander	So
OL	75	Kevin Angel	Jr
RB	13	Rick Bayless	Fr
OL	69	Mike Bennett	Jr
FB	35	Fred Bush	Jr
OL	78	Malcolm Christie	Fr
OT	61	Dave Croston	So
OL	58	Greg Divis	Fr
WR	1	Quinn Early	Fr
TE	86	Mike Flagg	Fr
OL	74	Chris Gambol	So
RB	33	Owen Gill (C)	Sr
OT	79	Mike Haight	Jr
WR	40	Bill Happel	Jr
RB	7	Kevin Harmon	Fr
RB	31	Ronnie Harmon	Jr
TE	34	Jonathan Hayes (C)	Jr
WR	87	Scott Helverson	Jr
G	65	Tom Humphrey	Jr
QB	16	Chuck Long	Jr
RB	26	Eddie Polite
OL	56	Mark Sindlinger	So
WR	2	Robert Smith	So
OL	53	Mark Spranger	So
QB	12	Mark Vlasic	So
OL	73	Herb Wester	Fr
WR	83	Jim McMachan	Jr

Defense

Pos.	#	Name	Class
DE	90	Doug Burrell	So
CB	29	Nate Creer	Jr
DB	18	Kyle Crowe	Jr
LB	37	George Davis	So
DL	76	Jeff Drost	So
DL	64	Paul Hufford (C)	Sr
DB	14	Keith Hunter (C)	Sr
DT	77	George Little	Sr
DE	98	George Millett	Jr
DB	21	Devon Mitchell	Jr
DB	45	Jay Norvell	Jr
DB	46	Jim Yost	Sr
DL	50	Hap Peterson	Jr
DE	99	Richard Pryor	So
LB	38	Kevin Spitzig (C)	Sr
LB	36	Larry Station	Jr
DB	41	Mike Stoops	Sr
DE		Dave Strobel	Sr
DL	51	Bill Weires	Jr

Special teams

Pos.	#	Name	Class
P/K	3	Tom Nichol	Sr

Head coach

- Hayden Fry

Coordinators/assistant coaches

- Bill Snyder – Offensive Coordinator/quarterbacks
- Bill Brashier – Defensive Coordinator
- Kirk Ferentz – Offensive line
- Carl Jackson – Running backs
- Del Miller – Offensive assistant
- Dan McCarney – Defensive line
- Barry Alvarez – Linebackers
- Don Patterson – Defensive Backs
- Bernie Wyatt – Defensive Ends/Recruiting Coordinator
- Bill Dervich – Strength and Conditioning
- Bob Stoops – Graduate Assistant

Legend

- (C) Team captain
- (S) Suspended
- (I) Ineligible
- Injured
- Redshirt

== Statistics ==
The team gained an average of 215.3 passing yards and 167.8 rushing yards per game. On defense, they held opponents to 170.5 passing yards and 99.4 rushing yards per game.

Quarterback Chuck Long completed 187 of 283 passes (66.1%) for 2,410 yards, 16 touchdowns, 13 interceptions, and a 147.1 passer rating.

Running back Ronnie Harmon led the team in rushing (907 rushing yards) and touchdowns (12). Owen Gill ranked second in rushing with 859 yards.

Wide receiver Bill Happel led the team in receiving with 39 receptions for 528 yards. Tight end Jonathan Hayes ranked second with 39 receptions for 442 yards, and Ronnie Harmon tallied 32 receptions for 318 yards.

== Awards and honors ==
Linebacker Larry Station was a consensus selection on the 1984 All-America college football team, receiving first-team honors from the Associated Press (AP), United Press International (UPI), Walter Camp Football Foundation, and Kodak (American Football Coaches Association). Station was later inducted into the College Football Hall of Fame.

Defensive tackle Paul Hufford was selected as the Big Ten Defensive Lineman of the Year.

Seven Iowa players received first-team honors on the 1984 All-Big Ten Conference football team: Long at quarterback (AP-1, UPI-1); Harmon at running back (AP-1, UPI-1); defensive linemen Paul Hufford (AP-1, UPI-1) and George Little (AP-1, UPI-1); linebacker Larry Station (AP-1, UPI-1); and defensive backs Mike Stoops (AP-1, UPI-1) and Devon Mitchell (AP-1).

== 1985 NFL draft ==
Player	Position	Round	Pick	NFL club
Jonathan Hayes	Tight end	2	41	Kansas City Chiefs
Owen Gill	Running back	2	53	Seattle Seahawks
George Little	Defensive tackle	3	65	Miami Dolphins
Dave Strobel	Linebacker	8	211	Cincinnati Bengals
