= 1984 Indiana Hoosiers football team =

American college football season

1984 Indiana Hoosiers football
- Conference: Big Ten Conference
- Record: 0–11 (0–9 Big Ten)
- Head coach: Bill Mallory (1st season)
- Defensive coordinator: Joe Novak (1st season)
- MVP: Joe Fitzgerald
- Captains: Joe Fitzgerald; Tom Van Dyck
- Home stadium: Memorial Stadium

1984 Big Ten Conference football standings
	Conf.					Overall
Team	W		L		T	W		L		T
No. 13 Ohio State $	7	–	2	–	0	9	–	3	–	0
Illinois	6	–	3	–	0	7	–	4	–	0
Purdue	6	–	3	–	0	7	–	5	–	0
No. 16 Iowa	5	–	3	–	1	8	–	4	–	1
Wisconsin	5	–	3	–	1	7	–	4	–	1
Michigan State	5	–	4	–	0	6	–	6	–	0
Michigan	5	–	4	–	0	6	–	6	–	0
Minnesota	3	–	6	–	0	4	–	7	–	0
Northwestern	2	–	7	–	0	2	–	9	–	0
Indiana	0	–	9	–	0	0	–	11	–	0
$ – Conference champion; Rankings from AP Poll

The 1984 Indiana Hoosiers football team represented Indiana University Bloomington during the 1984 Big Ten Conference football season. Led by first-year head coach Bill Mallory, the Hoosiers compiled an overall record of 0–11 with a mark of 0–9 in conference play, placing last out of ten teams in the Big Ten. The team played home games at Memorial Stadium in Bloomington, Indiana.

== Schedule ==
Date	Opponent	Site	Result	Attendance	Source
September 8	at Duke*	Wallace Wade Stadium; Durham, NC	L 24–31	23,500	
September 15	Kentucky*	Memorial Stadium; Bloomington, IN (rivalry)	L 14–48	44,389	
September 22	at Northwestern	Dyche Stadium; Evanston, IL	L 37–40	30,341	
September 29	No. 14 Michigan	Memorial Stadium; Bloomington, IN	L 6–14	38,729	
October 6	at Minnesota	Hubert H. Humphrey Metrodome; Minneapolis, MN	L 24–33	44,786	
October 13	at Michigan State	Spartan Stadium; East Lansing, MI (rivalry)	L 6–13	63,890	
October 20	Wisconsin^{†}	Memorial Stadium; Bloomington, IN	L 16–20	38,754	
October 27	No. 17 Iowa	Memorial Stadium; Bloomington, IN	L 20–24	37,747	
November 3	at No. 16 Ohio State	Ohio Stadium; Columbus, OH	L 7–50	89,366	
November 10	vs. Illinois	Hoosier Dome; Indianapolis, IN (rivalry)	L 7–34	49,264	
November 17	at Purdue	Ross–Ade Stadium; West Lafayette, IN (Old Oaken Bucket)	L 24–31	69,236	
*Non-conference game; ^{†}Homecoming; Rankings from AP Poll released prior to the game

== 1985 NFL draftees ==
Player	Position	Round	Pick	NFL club
Kevin Allen	Offensive tackle	1	9	Philadelphia Eagles
Mike Pendleton	Defensive back	10	279	Miami Dolphins
