= James Morrissey =

James, Jim or Jimmy Morrissey may refer to:

- James Morrissey (PR consultant), Irish public relations consultant
- James Morrissey (footballer), Australian rules footballer
- James P. Morrissey, president of Santa Clara University
- Jim Morrissey (American football), American football linebacker
- Jim Morrissey (politician), member of the California State Assembly
- Jim Morrissey (hurler), Irish hurler
- Jimmy Morrissey, American football center
