= 1984 Ohio State Buckeyes football team =

American college football season

1984 Ohio State Buckeyes football

Big Ten champion

Rose Bowl, L 17–20 vs. USC
- Conference: Big Ten Conference

Ranking
- Coaches: No. 12
- AP: No. 13
- Record: 9–3 (7–2 Big Ten)
- Head coach: Earle Bruce (6th season)
- Offensive coordinator: Glen Mason (5th season)
- Defensive coordinator: Bob Tucker (3rd season)
- MVP: Keith Byars
- Captains: Pepper Johnson; Mark Krerowicz; Kirk Lowdermilk; Mike Tomczak
- Home stadium: Ohio Stadium

1984 Big Ten Conference football standings
	Conf.					Overall
Team	W		L		T	W		L		T
No. 13 Ohio State $	7	–	2	–	0	9	–	3	–	0
Illinois	6	–	3	–	0	7	–	4	–	0
Purdue	6	–	3	–	0	7	–	5	–	0
No. 16 Iowa	5	–	3	–	1	8	–	4	–	1
Wisconsin	5	–	3	–	1	7	–	4	–	1
Michigan State	5	–	4	–	0	6	–	6	–	0
Michigan	5	–	4	–	0	6	–	6	–	0
Minnesota	3	–	6	–	0	4	–	7	–	0
Northwestern	2	–	7	–	0	2	–	9	–	0
Indiana	0	–	9	–	0	0	–	11	–	0
$ – Conference champion; Rankings from AP Poll

The 1984 Ohio State Buckeyes football team was an American football team that represented the Ohio State University as a member of the Big Ten Conference during the 1984 Big Ten season. In their sixth year under head coach Earle Bruce, the Buckeyes compiled a 9–3 record (7–2 in conference games), won the Big Ten championship, and outscored opponents by a total of 374 to 180. They concluded the season with a loss to USC in the 1985 Rose Bowl. The Buckeyes were ranked No. 13 in the final AP poll.

The Buckeyes gained an average of 231.0 rushing yards and 169.3 passing yards per game. On defense, they held opponents to 131.8 rushing yards and 173.9 passing yards per game. The team's statistical leaders included quarterback Mike Tomczak (1,662 passing yards, 58.5% completion percentage), running back Keith Byars (1,655 rushing yards, 5.3 yards per carry, 24 touchdowns), and wide receiver Mike Lanese (38 receptions for 585 yards). Byars and offensive guard Jim Lachey were consensus first-team picks on the 1984 All-America team. Six Ohio State players received first-team honors on the 1984 All-Big Ten Conference football team: Byars (AP/UPI); Lachey (AP/UPI); center Kirk Lowdermilk (AP/UPI); linebacker Pepper Johnson (AP/UPI); punter Tom Tupa (AP/UPI); and tackle Mark Krerowicz (UPI).

The team played its home games at Ohio Stadium in Columbus, Ohio.

== Schedule ==
Date	Time	Opponent	Rank	Site	TV	Result	Attendance	Source
September 8	12:00 p.m.	Oregon State*	No. 6	Ohio Stadium; Columbus, OH	SV	W 22–14	88,072	
September 15	3:30 p.m.	Washington State*	No. 9	Ohio Stadium; Columbus, OH	SV	W 44–0	89,297	
September 22	1:30 p.m.	No. 14 Iowa	No. 5	Ohio Stadium; Columbus, OH	SV	W 45–26	89,733	
September 29	8:00 p.m.	at Minnesota	No. 3	The Metrodome; Minneapolis, MN		W 35–22	47,543	
October 6	2:30 p.m.	at Purdue	No. 2	Ross–Ade Stadium; West Lafayette, IN		L 23–28	66,261	
October 13	3:30 p.m.	Illinois	No. 8	Ohio Stadium; Columbus, OH (Illibuck)	CBS, WOSU	W 45–38	89,937	
October 20	1:00 p.m.	at Michigan State	No. 8	Spartan Stadium; East Lansing, MI		W 23–20	75,123	
October 27	12:00 p.m.	at Wisconsin	No. 6	Camp Randall Stadium; Madison, WI	CBS	L 14–16	78,606	
November 3	1:30 p.m.	Indiana	No. 16	Ohio Stadium; Columbus, OH		W 50–7	89,366	
November 10	2:30 p.m.	at Northwestern	No. 13	Dyche Stadium; Evanston, IL		W 52–3	31,087	
November 17	12:00 p.m.	Michigan	No. 11	Ohio Stadium; Columbus, OH (rivalry)	CBS	W 21–6	90,286	
January 1, 1985	5:00 p.m.	vs. No. 18 USC*	No. 6	Rose Bowl; Pasadena, CA (Rose Bowl)	NBC	L 17–20	102,594	
*Non-conference game; Rankings from AP Poll released prior to the game; All times are in Eastern time

== Game summaries ==
=== Oregon State ===
Team	1	2	3	4	Total
Oregon State	7	7	0	0	14
• Ohio State	0	3	12	7	22

- Date: September 8
- Location: Ohio Stadium, Columbus, Ohio
- Game start: 12:00 PM EDT
- Game attendance: 88,297

=== Washington State ===
Team	1	2	3	4	Total
Washington State	0	0	0	0	0
• Ohio State	3	20	0	21	44

- Date: September 15
- Location: Ohio Stadium, Columbus, Ohio
- Game start: 3:30 PM EDT
- Game attendance: 88,297

=== Iowa ===
Team	1	2	3	4	Total
Iowa	3	17	6	0	26
• Ohio State	10	21	7	7	45

- Date: September 22
- Location: Ohio Stadium, Columbus, Ohio
- Game start: 3:30 PM EDT
- Game attendance: 89,733

=== Minnesota ===
Team	1	2	3	4	Total
• Ohio State	7	14	7	7	35
Minnesota	0	7	7	8	22

- Date: September 29
- Location: Hubert H. Humphrey Metrodome, Minneapolis
- Game start: 8:00 PM EDT
- Game attendance: 47,543

=== Purdue ===
#2 Ohio State Buckeyes at Purdue Boilermakers

Quarter	1	2	3	4	Total
Ohio St	7	3	7	6	23
Purdue	7	0	7	14	28

at Ross–Ade Stadium, West Lafayette, Indiana

- Date: October 6, 1984
- Game time: 1:31 p.m.
- Game weather: Mostly cloudy, 74 °F (23 °C)
- Game attendance: 66,261
- Box Score

Game information

First quarter

- PUR – Steve Griffin 20-yard pass from Jim Everett (Mike Rendina kick), 14:00. Purdue 7–0. Drive: 5 plays, 70 yards, 1:00.
- OSU – Keith Byars 20-yard run (Rich Spangler kick), 4:09. Tie 7–7. Drive: 2 plays, 29 yards, 0:50.

Second quarter

- OSU – Rich Spangler 34-yard field goal, 0:02. Ohio St 10–7. Drive: 5 plays, 35 yards, 0:26.

Third quarter

- OSU – Keith Byars 14-yard run (Rich Spangler kick), 13:43. Ohio St 17–7. Drive: 3 plays, 37 yards, 1:20.
- PUR – Steve Griffin 65-yard pass from Jim Everett (Mike Rendina kick), Ohio St 17–14. Drive: 6 plays, 88 yards, 2:54.

Fourth quarter

- PUR – Bruce King 4-yard pass from Jim Everett (Mike Rendina kick), 14:03. Purdue 21–17. Drive: 8 plays, 79 yards, 3:43.
- PUR – Rod Woodson 55-yard interception return (Mike Rendina kick), 10:03. Purdue 28–17.
- OSU – Cris Carter 5-yard pass from Mike Tomczak (run failed), 2:35. Purdue 28–23. Drive: 5 plays, 49 yards, 0:52.

Top passers

- OSU – Mike Tomczak – 20/41, 280 yards, TD, 2 INT
- PUR – Jim Everett – 17/23, 257 yards, 3 TD, INT

Top rushers

- OSU – Keith Byars – 30 rushes, 191 yards, 2 TD
- PUR – Ray Wallace – 20 rushes, 89 yards

Top receivers

- OSU – Keith Byars – 9 receptions, 102 yards
- PUR – Steve Griffin – 6 receptions, 131 yards, 2 TD

=== Illinois ===
Team	1	2	3	4	Total
Illinois	17	7	11	3	38
• Ohio State	0	21	14	10	45

- Date: October 13
- Location: Ohio Stadium, Columbus, Ohio
- Game start: 3:30 p.m. EDT
- Elapsed time: 3:28
- Game attendance: 89,937
- Game weather: Mostly sunny; 61 °F (16 °C); wind 5–6 mph (8.0–9.7 km/h) SE
- Referee: Otho Kortz

Scoring summary
Q1	7:40	ILL	Grant 3 yard pass from Trudeau (White kick)	ILL 7-0
Q1	2:58	ILL	White 26 yard field goal	ILL 10-0
Q1	1:14	ILL	Williams 10 yard pass from Trudeau (White kick)	ILL 17-0
Q2	14:47	ILL	Boso 8 yard pass from Trudeau (White kick)	ILL 24-0
Q2	4:13	OHST	Byars 16 yard run (Spangler kick)	ILL 24-7
Q2	3:23	OHST	Carter 33 yard pass from Tomczak	ILL 24-14
Q2	:23	OHST	Byars 4 yard run (Spangler kick)	ILL 24-21
Q3	13:40	OHST	Byars 1 yard run (Spangler kick)	OHST 28-24
Q3	10:42	ILL	White 46 yard field goal	OHST 28-27
Q3	8:57	OHST	Byars 67 yard run (Spangler kick)	OHST 35-27
Q3	1:09	ILL	Wilson 9 yard pass from Trudeau (Trudeau run)	Tie 35-35
Q4	10:21	OHST	Spangler 46 yard field goal	OHST 38-35
Q4	3:18	ILL	White 16 yard field goal	Tie 38-38
Q4	:36	OHST	Byars 3 yard run (Spangler kick)	OHST 45-38

- Keith Byars 39 Rush, 274 Yds
- Cris Carter 7 Rec, 134 Yds

=== Michigan State ===
Team	1	2	3	4	Total
• Ohio State	3	6	7	7	23
Michigan State	0	0	6	14	20

- Date: October 20
- Location: Spartan Stadium
- Game start: 1:00 p.m. EDT
- Elapsed time: 2:45
- Game attendance: 75,133
- Game weather: Cloudy; 55 °F (13 °C); wind 12–17 mph (19–27 km/h) S
- Referee: John Nealon

Scoring summary
Q1	2:14	OHST	Spangler 36 yard field goal	OHST 3–0
Q2	2:23	OHST	Spangler 42 yard field goal	OHST 6–0
Q2	0:10	OHST	Spangler 30 yard field goal	OHST 9–0
Q3	14:13	OHST	Byars 1 yard run (Spangler kick)	OHST 16–0
Q3	9:03	MSU	Morse 2 yard pass from Yarema (kick failed)	OHST 16–6
Q4	11:40	MSU	Ingram 75 yard pass from Yarema (pass failed)	OHST 16–12
Q4	4:44	OHST	Tomczak 1 yard run (Spangler kick)	OHST 23–12
Q4	4:32	MSU	Jackson 93 yard kickoff return (Rolle pass from Yarema)	OHST 23–20

- Lanese 7 Rec, 116 Yds

=== Wisconsin ===
Team	1	2	3	4	Total
Ohio State	0	0	7	7	14
• Wisconsin	0	10	0	6	16

- Date: October 27
- Location: Camp Randall Stadium
- Game start: 12 Noon EDT
- Elapsed time: 3:22
- Game attendance: 78,606
- Referee: Tom Quinn

=== Indiana ===
Team	1	2	3	4	Total
Indiana	0	0	0	7	7
• Ohio State	10	23	10	7	50

- Date: November 3
- Location: Ohio Stadium, Columbus, Ohio
- Game start: 1:30 EST
- Elapsed time: 2:41
- Game attendance: 89,366
- Referee: Jerry Hendrickson

Scoring summary
Q1	10:21	OHST	Spangler 36 yard field goal	OHST 3–0
Q1	9:24	OHST	White 20 yard interception return (Spangler kick)	OHST 10–0
Q2	11:04	OHST	Byars 3 yard run (Spangler kick)	OHST 17–0
Q2	5:13	OHST	Carter 44 yard pass from Tomczak (Spangler kick)	OHST 24-0
Q2	1:25	OHST	Walker 3 yard run (Spangler kick)	OHST 31–0
Q2	:25	OHST	Safety, Razmic blocked punt through end zone by Richardson	OHST 33–0
Q3	9:31	OHST	Woolridge 1 yard run (Spangler kick)	OHST 40–0
Q3	3:42	OHST	Spangler 27 yard field goal	OHST 43–0
Q4	9:07	IU	Brown 1 yard run (Rogers kick)	OHST 43–7
Q4	1:24	OHST	Delaney 2 yard run (Spangler kick)	OHST 50–7

=== Northwestern ===
Team	1	2	3	4	Total
• Ohio State	0	21	14	17	52
Northwestern	3	0	0	0	3

- Date: November 10
- Location: Dyche Stadium, Evanston, IL
- Game start: 2:30 PM EST
- Elapsed time: 2:52
- Game attendance: 31,087
- Game weather: Overcast

=== Michigan ===
Team	1	2	3	4	Total
Michigan	0	3	3	0	6
• Ohio St	7	0	14	0	21

- Date: November 17
- Location: Ohio Stadium, Columbus, Ohio
- Game start: 12:00 p.m. EST
- Elapsed time: 3:00
- Game attendance: 90,286
- Game weather: Mostly sunny; 38 °F (3 °C); wind 3 mph (4.8 km/h) W
- Referee: Otho Kortz

Scoring summary
Q1	4:47	OHST	Byars 1 yard run (Spangler kick)	OHST 7-0
Q2	:01	MICH	Bergeron 37 yard field goal	OHST 7-3
Q3	7:55	MICH	Bergeron 45 yard field goal	OHST 7-6
Q3	6:08	OHST	Byars 2 yard run (Spangler kick)	OHST 14-6
Q3	4:43	OHST	Byars 2 yard run (Spangler kick)	OHST 21-6

=== Rose Bowl ===
Rose Bowl

Team	1	2	3	4	Total
Ohio St	3	3	3	8	17
• USC	10	7	3	0	20

- Date: January 1
- Location: Rose Bowl, Pasadena, California
- Game start: 2:00 p.m.
- Elapsed time: 3:10
- Game attendance: 102,594
- Game weather: Sunny; 75 °F (24 °C); wind 10 mph (16 km/h) S
- Referee: James Sprenger
- TV announcers (NBC): Dick Enberg and Merlin Olsen

Scoring summary
Q1	12:08	OHST	Spangler 21 yard field goal	OHST 3-0
Q1	8:52	USC	Jordan 51 yard field goal	Tie 3-3
Q1	1:54	USC	Cormier 3 yard pass from Green (Jordan kick)	USC 10-3
Q2	:22	USC	Ware 19 yard pass from Green (Jordan kick)	USC 17-3
Q2	:00	OHST	Spangler 46 yard field goal	USC 17-6
Q3	8:37	OHST	Spangler 52 yard field goal	USC 17-9
Q3	4:05	USC	Jordan 51 yard field goal	USC 20-9
Q4	7:34	OHST	Carter 18 yard pass from Tomczak (Spangler kick)	USC 20-17

- Rich Spangler's 52 yard field goal (Rose Bowl record)
- Cris Carter 9 Rec, 172 Yds

== Personnel ==
=== Coaching staff ===
- Earle Bruce – Head coach – 6th year
- Gary Blackney – Defensive backs (1st year)
- Bill Conley – Inside linebacker (1st year)
- Steve Devine – Offensive line (2nd year)
- Randy Hart – Defensive line (3rd year)
- Glen Mason – Offensive coordinator (7th year)
- Bill Myles – Offensive line (8th year)
- Fred Pagac – Defensive linebackers (3rd year)
- Jim Tressel – Quarterbacks (2nd year)
- Bob Tucker – Defensive coordinator (6th year)

=== Depth chart ===
Defense

FS
12 Terry White
11 Steve Hill

OLB	ILB	ILB	OLB
82 Byron Lee	98 Pepper Johnson	33 Larry Kolic	58 Dennis Hueston
⋅	90 Fred Ridder	36 Chris Spielman (ankle injury)	14 Eric Kumerow

ROV
7 Sonny Gordon
⋅

CB
37 William White
⋅

DE	NT	DE
57 Dave Morrill	59 Tony Giuliani	97 Dave Crecelius
95 Darryl Lee	55 Ray Holliman	⋅

CB
29 Greg Rogan
8 Scott Leach

Offense

SE
2 Cris Carter
49 Doug Smith

LT	LG	C	RG	RT
75 Rory Graves	64 Jim Lachey	63 Kirk Lowdermilk	74 Scott Zalenski	73 Mark Krerowicz
⋅	⋅	71 Bob Maggs	56 Jim Gilmore	⋅

TE
80 Ed Taggart
85 Judd Groza

FL
1 Mike Lanese
6 Jamie Holland

QB
15 Mike Tomczak
16 Jim Karsatos

FB
28 Roman Bates
43 Barry Walker

Special teams
PK 10 Rich Spangler
P 19 Tom Tupa

RB
41 Keith Byars
25 John Wooldridge

== 1985 NFL draftees ==
Player	Round	Pick	Position	NFL club
Jim Lachey	1	12	Tackle	San Diego Chargers
Kirk Lowdermilk	3	59	Center	Minnesota Vikings
Mark Krerowicz	6	147	Guard	Cleveland Browns
