= 1984 Wisconsin Badgers football team =

American college football season

1984 Wisconsin Badgers football

Hall of Fame Classic, L 19–20 vs. Kentucky
- Conference: Big Ten Conference
- Record: 7–4–1 (5–3–1 Big Ten)
- Head coach: Dave McClain (7th season)
- Offensive coordinator: Bill Dudley (5th season)
- Offensive scheme: Pro-style
- Defensive coordinator: Jim Hilles (7th season)
- Base defense: 3–4
- MVP: Al Toon
- Captain: Game captains
- Home stadium: Camp Randall Stadium

1984 Big Ten Conference football standings
	Conf.					Overall
Team	W		L		T	W		L		T
No. 13 Ohio State $	7	–	2	–	0	9	–	3	–	0
Illinois	6	–	3	–	0	7	–	4	–	0
Purdue	6	–	3	–	0	7	–	5	–	0
No. 16 Iowa	5	–	3	–	1	8	–	4	–	1
Wisconsin	5	–	3	–	1	7	–	4	–	1
Michigan State	5	–	4	–	0	6	–	6	–	0
Michigan	5	–	4	–	0	6	–	6	–	0
Minnesota	3	–	6	–	0	4	–	7	–	0
Northwestern	2	–	7	–	0	2	–	9	–	0
Indiana	0	–	9	–	0	0	–	11	–	0
$ – Conference champion; Rankings from AP Poll

The 1984 Wisconsin Badgers football team represented the University of Wisconsin–Madison in the 1984 Big Ten Conference football season. Led by seventh-year head coach Dave McClain, the Badgers compiled an overall record of 7–5–1 with a mark of 5–3–1 in conference play, tying for fourth place in the Big Ten. Wisconsin was invited to the Hall of Fame Classic, where the Badgers lost to Kentucky. The team played home games at Camp Randall Stadium in Madison, Wisconsin.

== Schedule ==
Date	Opponent	Rank	Site	Result	Attendance	Source
September 8	Northern Illinois*		Camp Randall Stadium; Madison, WI	W 27–14	65,288	
September 15	at Missouri*		Faurot Field; Columbia, MO	W 35–34	45,033	
September 22	at No. 16 Michigan		Michigan Stadium; Ann Arbor, MI	L 14–20	104,239	
September 29	Northwestern		Camp Randall Stadium; Madison, WI	W 31–16	78,509	
October 6	at Illinois		Memorial Stadium; Champaign, IL	L 6–22	76,428	
October 13	Minnesota^{†}		Camp Randall Stadium; Madison, WI (rivalry)	L 14–17	78,770	
October 20	at Indiana		Memorial Stadium; Bloomington, IN	W 20–16	38,754	
October 27	No. 6 Ohio State		Camp Randall Stadium; Madison, WI	W 16–14	78,606	
November 3	at No. 17 Iowa		Kinnick Stadium; Iowa City, IA (rivalry)	T 10–10	66,255	
November 10	Purdue		Camp Randall Stadium; Madison, WI	W 30–13	72,292	
November 17	at Michigan State		Spartan Stadium; East Lansing, MI	W 20–10	61,702	
December 29	vs. Kentucky*	No. 20	Legion Field; Birmingham, AL (Hall of Fame Classic)	L 19–20	47,300	
*Non-conference game; ^{†}Homecoming; Rankings from AP Poll released prior to the game

== Roster ==
1984 Wisconsin Badgers football team roster
Players
Coaches
Offense

Pos.	#	Name	Class
RB	23	Joe Armentrout	So
TE	85	Dave Arneson	Sr
OT	75	Kevin Belcher	Sr
FB	31	Brian Bonner	So
FB	32	Kemal Carr	Sr
OT	72	Jeff Dellenbach	Sr
RB	41	Gary Ellerson	Sr
RB	25	Larry Emery	So
C	54	David Gaatz	Sr
G	77	Paul Gruber	So
FB	34	Marck Harrison	Sr
QB	7	Mike Howard	So
WR	4	Michael Jones	Sr
QB	10	Bob Kobza	Sr
G	66	Bob Landsee	Jr
WR	20	Thad McFadden	Sr
G	67	Dave Mielke	Sr
G	78	Chris Osswald	Sr
TE	86	Bret Pearson	Sr
G	57	Bill Schick	Jr
WR	87	Al Toon	Sr
C	51	Dan Turk	Sr
TE	94	Mark Wheeler	Sr

Defense

Pos.	#	Name	Class
S	37	Russ Bellford	Sr
DT	92	Scott Bergold	Sr
NT	63	Michael Boykins	So
NT	68	Lance Branaman	So
LB	42	Charlie Fawley	So
LB	55	Russ Fields	Sr
LB	96	Brad Grabow	Sr
LB	99	Rick Graf	So
DT	84	Brian Hoffman	Jr
CB	29	Richard Johnson	Sr
S	21	Robb Johnston	So
LB	95	Tim Jordan	So
DT	54	Jim Kmet	So
LB	33	James Melka	Sr
CB	38	Nate Odomes	So
NT	89	Brad Pierce	Sr
LB	28	Art Price	Sr
LB	53	Craig Raddatz	So
LB	52	Michael Reid	So
DT	72	Kurt Schlicht (injured)	So
DT	60	Darryl Sims	Sr
CB	3	Ken Stills	Sr
CB	44	Bobby Taylor	So
S	2	Averick Walker	Sr

Special teams

Pos.	#	Name	Class
P	18	Scott Cepicky	Fr
K	5	Todd Gregoire	Fr

Head coach

- Dave McClain

Coordinators/assistant coaches

- Bill Dudley – Offensive Coordinator/Quarterbacks and Running Backs
- Jim Hilles – Assistant Head Coach/Defensive Coordinator/Inside Linebackers
- Dave Anderson – Outside Linebackers
- Chuck Heater – Defensive Backs
- Fred Jackson – Wide Receivers
- Arnold Jeter – Defensive Line
- Ron McBride – Interior Offensive Line
- Scott Seeliger – Offensive Line/Tight Ends/Special Teams
- Jerry Fishbain – Recruiting Coordinator

Legend

- (C) Team captain
- (S) Suspended
- (I) Ineligible
- Injured
- Redshirt

== 1985 NFL draft ==
Player	Position	Round	Pick	NFL club
Al Toon	Wide Receiver	1	10	New York Jets
Richard Johnson	Cornerback	1	11	Houston Oilers
Darryl Sims	Defensive End	1	20	Pittsburgh Steelers
Scott Bergold	Tackle	2	51	St. Louis Cardinals
Dan Turk	Center	4	101	Pittsburgh Steelers
Jeff Dellenbach	Tackle	4	111	Miami Dolphins
Gary Ellerson	Running Back	7	182	Green Bay Packers
Kevin Belcher	Tackle	7	186	Los Angeles Raiders
Ken Stills	Defensive Back	8	209	Green Bay Packers
Bret Pearson	Tight End	12	329	San Diego Chargers
James Melka	Linebacker	12	330	Tampa Bay Buccaneers
