= Rick Schulte =

American football player (1963–2008)

No. 61, 63
- Position: Guard

Personal information
- Born: January 24, 1963; Chicago, Illinois, U.S.
- Died: June 14, 2008 (aged 45); Tempe, Arizona, U.S.
- Listed height: 6 ft 2 in (1.88 m)
- Listed weight: 270 lb (122 kg)

Career information
- High school: Maine West (Des Plaines, Illinois)
- College: Illinois
- NFL draft: 1985: undrafted

Career history
- Tampa Bay Buccaneers (1985)*; Arizona Outlaws (1986)*; Chicago Bears (1986)*; Buffalo Bills (1987); Indianapolis Colts (1988)*; Los Angeles Raiders (1993)*
- * Offseason or practice squad member only

Career NFL statistics
- Games played: 3
- Games started: 3
- Fumble recoveries: 1
- Stats at Pro Football Reference

Richard Jean-Marie Schulte (January 24, 1963 – June 14, 2008) was an American professional football player who was a guard for the Buffalo Bills of the National Football League (NFL) as a replacement player during the 1987 NFL strike. He also played with the Chicago Bears, Indianapolis Colts, Los Angeles Raiders, and Tampa Bay Buccaneers of the NFL, as well as the Arizona Outlaws of the United States Football League (USFL). He played college football for the Illinois Fighting Illini.

== College career ==
Schulte played at the University of Illinois Urbana-Champaign with the Fighting Illini, starting 26 games over three seasons (1982–1984) at left guard. In 1984, Schulte was a co-captain of the team in addition to receiving the Bruce Capel Award.

== Professional career ==
=== Tampa Bay Buccaneers ===
Schulte was signed by the Tampa Bay Buccaneers as an undrafted rookie in 1985. He wore jersey number 61 with the Buccaneers and appeared on the roster for the team's first two preseason games before being released on August 20, 1985.

=== Arizona Outlaws ===
In 1986, Schulte signed with the Arizona Outlaws of the United States Football League, where he played center. However, the league folded before any games were played that season.

=== Chicago Bears ===
Schulte spent time with the Chicago Bears, but never played in a regular season game with the team. He was waived by the Bears on September 29, 1986, and released the following day.

=== Buffalo Bills ===
Schulte was on the offseason roster of the Buffalo Bills in 1987. On August 19, 1987, Schulte was terminated by the Bills.

Schulte had been working as a communications company salesman when he rejoined the Bills as a replacement player during the 1987 NFL players' strike. He played three games with the Bills during the strike: an October 4 game against the Indianapolis Colts, an October 11 game against the New England Patriots, and an October 18 game against the New York Giants.

In his third and final NFL game, against the Giants, Schulte was told by coach Marv Levy to protect against future Hall of Famer Lawrence Taylor, who had crossed the picket line and played during the strike. Schulte was called for five penalties in the game and played rough against Taylor, even kicking him in the nose after a play. The Bills ultimately won the game 6–3.

After that week, the strike ended, and teams no longer had a need for their replacement players. Schulte was placed on injured reserve on October 20, 1987, then released by the team a month later on November 19.

=== Indianapolis Colts ===
Schulte spent a brief amount of time with the Indianapolis Colts, who released him on August 3, 1988.

=== Los Angeles Raiders ===
In 1993, Schulte made a brief comeback to the NFL with the Los Angeles Raiders. However, he had found success with his own company, and left the league "on [his] own terms," leaving the Raiders without ever playing a game.

== Death ==
Schulte died in Tempe, Arizona on June 14, 2008, from an apparent heart attack at the age of 45.
