= 1984 Northwestern Wildcats football team =

American college football season

1984 Northwestern Wildcats football
- Conference: Big Ten Conference
- Record: 2–9 (2–7 Big Ten)
- Head coach: Dennis Green (4th season)
- Captains: Jim Bobbitt; Phil Leonard
- Home stadium: Dyche Stadium

1984 Big Ten Conference football standings
| | Conf. | | | | | Overall |
| Team | W | | L | | T | W | | L | | T |
|---|---|---|---|---|---|---|---|---|---|---|
| No. 13 Ohio State $ | 7 | – | 2 | – | 0 | 9 | – | 3 | – | 0 |
| Illinois | 6 | – | 3 | – | 0 | 7 | – | 4 | – | 0 |
| Purdue | 6 | – | 3 | – | 0 | 7 | – | 5 | – | 0 |
| No. 16 Iowa | 5 | – | 3 | – | 1 | 8 | – | 4 | – | 1 |
| Wisconsin | 5 | – | 3 | – | 1 | 7 | – | 4 | – | 1 |
| Michigan State | 5 | – | 4 | – | 0 | 6 | – | 6 | – | 0 |
| Michigan | 5 | – | 4 | – | 0 | 6 | – | 6 | – | 0 |
| Minnesota | 3 | – | 6 | – | 0 | 4 | – | 7 | – | 0 |
| Northwestern | 2 | – | 7 | – | 0 | 2 | – | 9 | – | 0 |
| Indiana | 0 | – | 9 | – | 0 | 0 | – | 11 | – | 0 |
$ – Conference champion; Rankings from AP Poll

The 1984 Northwestern Wildcats team represented Northwestern University during the 1984 Big Ten Conference football season. In their fourth year under head coach Dennis Green, the Wildcats compiled a 2–9 record (2–7 against Big Ten Conference opponents) and finished in ninth place in the Big Ten Conference.

The team's offensive leaders were quarterback Sandy Schwab with 845 passing yards, Casey Cummings with 386 rushing yards, and Tony Coates with 311 receiving yards. Defensive lineman Keith Cruise received first-team All-Big Ten honors from both the Associated Press and the United Press International.

== Schedule ==
| Date | Opponent | Site | Result | Attendance | Source |
|---|---|---|---|---|---|
| September 1 | at Illinois | Memorial Stadium; Champaign, IL (rivalry) | L 16–24 | 75,753 | |
| September 8 | at No. 19 Washington* | Husky Stadium; Seattle, WA | L 0–26 | 55,364 | |
| September 15 | Syracuse* | Dyche Stadium; Evanston, IL | L 12–13 | 23,199 | |
| September 22 | Indiana | Dyche Stadium; Evanston, IL | W 40–37 | 30,341 | |
| September 29 | at Wisconsin | Camp Randall Stadium; Madison, WI | L 16–31 | 78,509 | |
| October 6 | Iowa | Dyche Stadium; Evanston, IL | L 3–31 | 36,598 | |
| October 13 | at Michigan | Michigan Stadium; Ann Arbor, MI (rivalry) | L 0–31 | 102,245 | |
| October 20 | at Minnesota | Hubert H. Humphrey Metrodome; Minneapolis, MN | W 31–28 | 56,934 | |
| October 27 | Purdue | Dyche Stadium; Evanston, IL | L 7–49 | 28,884 | |
| November 3 | at Michigan State | Spartan Stadium; East Lansing, MI | L 10–27 | 63,619 | |
| November 10 | No. 13 Ohio State | Dyche Stadium; Evanston, IL | L 3–52 | 31,087 | |
*Non-conference game; Rankings from AP Poll released prior to the game

== Roster ==
1984 Northwestern Wildcats football team roster
Players
Coaches
Offense

| Pos. | # | Name | Class |
|---|---|---|---|
| TE | 88 | Rich Borresen | Jr |
| WR | 82 | Curtis Duncan | So |
| QB | | Sandy Schwab | Jr |
| WR | 6 | Steve Tasker | Sr |
| QB | 11 | Mike Wall | Sr |

Defense

| Pos. | # | Name | Class |
|---|---|---|---|
| DT | 54 | Tom Flaherty | Jr |
| DT | 53 | Ted Karras | So |
| LB | 26 | Alex Moyer | Sr |
| LB | 57 | Mike Witteck | Jr |

Special teams

| Pos. | # | Name | Class |

Head coach

- Dennis Green

Coordinators/assistant coaches

Legend

- (C) Team captain
- (S) Suspended
- (I) Ineligible
- Injured
- Redshirt
