= 1984 Minnesota Golden Gophers football team =

American college football season

1984 Minnesota Golden Gophers football
- Conference: Big Ten Conference
- Record: 4–7 (3–6 Big Ten)
- Head coach: Lou Holtz (1st season)
- Defensive coordinator: John Gutekunst (1st season)
- MVP: Rickey Foggie
- Captain: Mark Vonderhaar
- Home stadium: Hubert H. Humphrey Metrodome

1984 Big Ten Conference football standings
	Conf.					Overall
Team	W		L		T	W		L		T
No. 13 Ohio State $	7	–	2	–	0	9	–	3	–	0
Illinois	6	–	3	–	0	7	–	4	–	0
Purdue	6	–	3	–	0	7	–	5	–	0
No. 16 Iowa	5	–	3	–	1	8	–	4	–	1
Wisconsin	5	–	3	–	1	7	–	4	–	1
Michigan State	5	–	4	–	0	6	–	6	–	0
Michigan	5	–	4	–	0	6	–	6	–	0
Minnesota	3	–	6	–	0	4	–	7	–	0
Northwestern	2	–	7	–	0	2	–	9	–	0
Indiana	0	–	9	–	0	0	–	11	–	0
$ – Conference champion; Rankings from AP Poll

The 1984 Minnesota Golden Gophers football team represented the University of Minnesota in the 1984 Big Ten Conference football season. In their first year under head coach Lou Holtz, the Golden Gophers compiled a 4–7 record and were outscored by their opponents by a combined total of 316 to 194.

Quarterback Rickey Foggie received the team's Most Valuable Player award. Linebacker Peter Najarian, punter Adam Kelly and offensive tackle Mark VonderHaar were named All-Big Ten second team. Linebacker Peter Najarian, defensive lineman Craig Paulson and running back David Puk were named Academic All-Big Ten.Mark VondeHaar was awarded the Bruce Smith Award. Peter Najarian was awarded the Carl Eller Award. Strong safety Larry Joyner was awarded the Bobby Bell Award. Center John Kelly was awarded the Butch Nash Award. Flanker Dwayne McMullen was awarded the Paul Giel Award.

Total attendance for the season was 310,745, which averaged out to 51,791 per game. The season high for attendance was against rival Iowa.

== Schedule ==
Date	Opponent	Site	Result	Attendance	Source
September 8	Rice*	Hubert H. Humphrey Metrodome; Minneapolis, MN	W 31–24	50,576	
September 15	at No. 1 Nebraska*	Memorial Stadium; Lincoln, NE (rivalry)	L 7–38	76,077	
September 22	at Purdue	Ross–Ade Stadium; West Lafayette, IN	L 10–34	61,538	
September 29	No. 3 Ohio State	Hubert H. Humphrey Metrodome; Minneapolis, MN	L 22–35	47,534	
October 6	Indiana	Hubert H. Humphrey Metrodome; Minneapolis, MN	W 33–24	44,786	
October 13	at Wisconsin	Camp Randall Stadium; Madison, WI (rivalry)	W 17–14	78,770	
October 20	Northwestern^{†}	Hubert H. Humphrey Metrodome; Minneapolis, MN	L 28–31	56,934	
October 27	Michigan State	Hubert H. Humphrey Metrodome; Minneapolis, MN	L 13–20	47,427	
November 3	at Illinois	Memorial Stadium; Champaign, IL	L 3–48	76,056	
November 10	at Michigan	Michigan Stadium; Ann Arbor, MI (Little Brown Jug)	L 7–31	101,247	
November 17	Iowa	Hubert H. Humphrey Metrodome; Minneapolis, MN (rivalry)	W 23–17	63,479	
*Non-conference game; ^{†}Homecoming; Rankings from AP Poll released prior to the game

== Game summaries ==
=== Wisconsin ===
Team	1	2	3	4	Total
• Minnesota	0	7	7	3	17
Wisconsin	0	14	0	0	14

- Date: October 13
- Location: Camp Randall Stadium
- Game attendance: 78,770

Scoring summary
Q2		WIS	Howard 1 yard run (Gregoire kick)	WIS 7–0
Q2		MINN	Foggie 35 yard run (Lohmiller kick)	Tie 7–7
Q2		WIS	Jones 6 yard pass from Howard (Gregoire kick)	WIS 14–7
Q3	5:58	MINN	Foggie 43 yard run (Lohmiller kick)	Tie 14–14
Q4	6:26	MINN	Lohmiller 26 yard field goal	MINN 17–14

Minnesota's defense stopped Wisconsin on fourth down at the Gophers' two-yard line after the Badgers had driven 90 yards following Lohmiller's go-ahead field goal.

- Rickey Foggie 24 Rush, 152 Yds

=== Iowa ===
Quarter	1	2	3	4	Total
Iowa	0	7	7	3	17
Minnesota	0	7	3	13	23

at Hubert H. Humphrey Metrodome, Minneapolis, MN

- Date: November 17
- Game attendance: 63,479

Game information

1st Quarter

- No Scoring

2nd Quarter

- IOWA: Gill 11 yard rush (Nichol kick)
- MIN: Starks 1 yard pass from Foggie (Lohmiller kick)

3rd Quarter

- IOWA: Happel 95 yard punt return (Nichol kick)
- MIN: Lohmiller 40 yard field goal

4th Quarter

- IOWA: Nichol 25 yard field goal
- MIN: Couch 14 yard rush (Lohmiller kick)
- MIN: Lohmiller 34 yard field goal

Passing

- IOWA: Long 15/26, 224 yards, INT
- MIN: Foggie 8/17, 78 yards, INT, Sadek 0/1

Rushing

- IOWA: Gill 27/133, Sennott 5/24, Bayless 2/18, Long 6/-13
- MIN: D. Puk 15/79, Foggie 16/52, C. Holmes 6/44, Collier 9/17, Couch 2/14, Serie 1/0, Sadek 1/-9

Receiving

- IOWA: Gill 6/64, Happel 3/53, Hayes 2/49, Smith 1/32, Halverson 1/14
- MIN: Anderson 2/32, D. Puk 1/16, Serie 2/13, Howard 1/12, C. Holmes 1/4, Starks 1/1

== Roster ==
- QB Rickey Foggie
- K Chip Lohmiller, Fr.
- OT Mark VonderHaar
