= Chris Zurbrugg =

American football player (born 1964)

No. 12 – Michigan Wolverines
- Position: Quarterback

Personal information
- Born: August 10, 1964 (age 62)

Career information
- High school: Alliance High School, Alliance, Ohio
- College: Michigan

Career history
- 1984–1986: Michigan

Awards and highlights
- Starting QB in the 1984 Holiday Bowl; Set Michigan single-game record with 259 passing yards, November 3, 1984; Tied Michigan single-game record with 4 TD passes, November 3, 1984

Christopher M. Zurbrugg (born August 10, 1964) is an American former football player. He played at the quarterback position for the University of Michigan from 1984 to 1986. He was Michigan's starting quarterback in the last half of the 1984 season and led the Wolverines in the 1984 Holiday Bowl against the national champion BYU Cougars. In his second start for Michigan, Zurbrugg set a Michigan record for most passing yards in a game and tied the record with four touchdown passes in a game. Zurbrugg later became a high school teacher and football coach in Alliance, Ohio.

== Early life ==
Zurbrugg grew up in Alliance, Ohio and graduated from Alliance High School in 1983. He accepted a football scholarship to attend the University of Michigan.

== University of Michigan ==
Zurbrugg became the starting quarterback as a redshirt freshman halfway through the season for the 1984 Michigan Wolverines football team. Jim Harbaugh sustained a broken arm, and head coach Bo Schembechler turned to Zurbrugg to lead the Michigan offense. Schembechler noted that he had been reluctant to start Zurbrugg, because he had two cracked vertebrae in his back during the spring of 1984. In his first start on October 27, 1984, Zurbrugg rushed for 51 yards and scored a rushing touchdown in leading Michigan to a 26-18 win over Illinois.

In his second start, Zurbrugg broke the Michigan single-game record with 259 passing yards against Purdue. (Zurbrugg's record was broken the following year by Harbaugh.) He threw four touchdown passes against Purdue, including three (to Triando Markray, Vince Bean, and Sim Nelson) in the final 4:08 of the game. His four touchdown passes against Purdue also tied Michigan's single game record for touchdown passes in a single game.

The following week, Zurbrugg led Michigan to a 31-7 win over Minnesota. Zurbrugg completed 7 of 10 passes against Minnesota and scored on a passing touchdown to Sim Nelson and also ran for 41 yards and a touchdown. For the 1984 season, Zurbrugg completed 63 of 119 passes and 691 yards. In December 1984, Schembechler summed up Zurbrugg's performance: "He's a competitive kid, a smart kid; he just hasn't had a lot of work. He's played some decent football, but what he is a freshman. It hasn't been easy for him or us, but I think we can win the game [the Holiday Bowl] with him."

In the 1984 Holiday Bowl, Zurbrugg completed 7 of 15 passes for 82 yards and threw a touchdown pass to Bob Perryman. Michigan lost the Holiday Bowl by a score of 24-17 to the 1984 national champion BYU Cougars.

With Harbaugh's return, Zurbrugg became a backup and completed 7 of 21 passes for 168 yards during the 1985 and 1986 seasons. He scored two rushing touchdowns in a 1986 victory over Illinois.

Though eligible to complete during the 1987 season, Zurbrugg announced in early September 1987 that he would forgo his final year of eligibility for personal reasons.

== Later life ==
After graduating from Michigan, Zurbrugg became a high school teacher and football coach in Alliance, Ohio. He was married in May 1990 to Christi L. Weirich in Stark County, Ohio.
