= 1984 Illinois Fighting Illini football team =

American college football season

1984 Illinois Fighting Illini football
- Conference: Big Ten Conference
- Record: 7–4 (6–3 Big Ten)
- Head coach: Mike White (5th season)
- MVP: David Williams
- Captains: Rick Schulte; Dave Edwards
- Home stadium: Memorial Stadium

1984 Big Ten Conference football standings
	Conf.					Overall
Team	W		L		T	W		L		T
No. 13 Ohio State $	7	–	2	–	0	9	–	3	–	0
Illinois	6	–	3	–	0	7	–	4	–	0
Purdue	6	–	3	–	0	7	–	5	–	0
No. 16 Iowa	5	–	3	–	1	8	–	4	–	1
Wisconsin	5	–	3	–	1	7	–	4	–	1
Michigan State	5	–	4	–	0	6	–	6	–	0
Michigan	5	–	4	–	0	6	–	6	–	0
Minnesota	3	–	6	–	0	4	–	7	–	0
Northwestern	2	–	7	–	0	2	–	9	–	0
Indiana	0	–	9	–	0	0	–	11	–	0
$ – Conference champion; Rankings from AP Poll

The 1984 Illinois Fighting Illini football team was an American football team that represented the University of Illinois at Urbana-Champaign as a member of the Big Ten Conference during the 1984 Big Ten Conference football season. In their fifth year under head coach Mike White, the Illini compiled a 7–3 record (6–3 in conference games), tied for second place in the Big Ten, and outscored opponents by a total of 323 to 209.

The team's statistical leaders included quarterback Jack Trudeau (2,724 passing yards, 65.3% completion percentage), running back Thomas Rooks (1,056 rushing yards, 4.8 yards per carry), wide receiver David Williams (101 receptions for 1,278 yards), and kicker Chris White (103 points scored, 31 of 32 extra points, 24 of 28 field goals). Six Illinois players received first-team honors on the 1984 All-Big Ten Conference football team: Rooks at running back (UPI-1); Chris Babyar at guard (AP-1, UPI-1); Jim Juriga at tackle; tight end Cap Boso (AP-1); Williams at wide receiver (AP-1, UPI-1); White at kicker (AP-1, UPI-1).

The team played its home games at Memorial Stadium in Champaign, Illinois.

== Schedule ==
Date	Opponent	Site	Result	Attendance	Source
September 1	Northwestern	Memorial Stadium; Champaign, IL (rivalry)	W 24–16	75,753	
September 8	Missouri*	Memorial Stadium; Champaign, IL (rivalry)	W 30–24	78,297	
September 15	at Stanford*	Stanford Stadium; Stanford, CA	L 19–34	43,795	
September 22	Michigan State	Memorial Stadium; Champaign, IL	W 40–7	75,762	
September 29	at Iowa	Kinnick Stadium; Iowa City, IA	L 16–21	66,322	
October 6	Wisconsin	Memorial Stadium; Champaign, IL	W 22–6	76,428	
October 13	at No. 8 Ohio State	Ohio Stadium; Columbus, OH (Illibuck)	L 38–45	89,937	
October 20	Purdue	Memorial Stadium; Champaign, IL (rivalry)	W 34–20	76,101	
October 27	at Michigan	Michigan Stadium; Ann Arbor, MI (rivalry)	L 18–26	104,916	
November 3	Minnesota	Memorial Stadium; Champaign, IL	W 48–3	76,056	
November 10	vs. Indiana	Hoosier Dome; Indianapolis, IN (rivalry)	W 34–7	46,264	
*Non-conference game; Rankings from AP Poll released prior to the game
