= 1984 Purdue Boilermakers football team =

American college football season

1984 Purdue Boilermakers football

Peach Bowl, L 24–27 vs. Virginia
- Conference: Big Ten Conference
- Record: 7–5 (6–3 Big Ten)
- Head coach: Leon Burtnett (3rd season)
- Offensive coordinator: Jim Colletto (3rd season)
- Defensive coordinator: Joe Tiller (2nd season)
- MVP: Jim Everett
- Captains: Bruce King; Brian Thornson
- Home stadium: Ross–Ade Stadium

1984 Big Ten Conference football standings
	Conf.					Overall
Team	W		L		T	W		L		T
No. 13 Ohio State $	7	–	2	–	0	9	–	3	–	0
Illinois	6	–	3	–	0	7	–	4	–	0
Purdue	6	–	3	–	0	7	–	5	–	0
No. 16 Iowa	5	–	3	–	1	8	–	4	–	1
Wisconsin	5	–	3	–	1	7	–	4	–	1
Michigan State	5	–	4	–	0	6	–	6	–	0
Michigan	5	–	4	–	0	6	–	6	–	0
Minnesota	3	–	6	–	0	4	–	7	–	0
Northwestern	2	–	7	–	0	2	–	9	–	0
Indiana	0	–	9	–	0	0	–	11	–	0
$ – Conference champion; Rankings from AP Poll

The 1984 Purdue Boilermakers football team represented Purdue University during the 1984 Big Ten Conference football season. Led by third-year head coach Leon Burtnett, the Boilermakers compiled an overall record of 7–5 with a mark of 6–3 in conference play, tying for second place in the Big Ten. Purdue was invited to the Peach Bowl, where the Boilermakers lost to Virginia. The team played home games at Ross–Ade Stadium in West Lafayette, Indiana. The Boilermakers defeated Notre Dame, Ohio State, and Michigan in the same season for the first and only time in college football history.

== Schedule ==
Date	Opponent	Rank	Site	Result	Attendance	Source
September 8	vs. No. 8 Notre Dame*		Hoosier Dome; Indianapolis, IN (rivalry)	W 23–21	60,672	
September 15	No. 5 Miami (FL)*		Ross–Ade Stadium; West Lafayette, IN	L 17–28	56,761	
September 22	Minnesota		Ross–Ade Stadium; West Lafayette, IN	W 34–10	61,538	
September 29	at Michigan State		Spartan Stadium; East Lansing, MI	W 13–10	64,819	
October 6	No. 2 Ohio State		Ross–Ade Stadium; West Lafayette, IN	W 28–23	66,261	
October 13	Iowa^{†}	No. 14	Ross–Ade Stadium; West Lafayette, IN	L 3–40	66,359	
October 20	at Illinois		Memorial Stadium; Champaign, IL (rivalry)	L 20–34	76,101	
October 27	at Northwestern		Dyche Stadium; Evanston, IL	W 49–7	28,884	
November 3	Michigan		Ross–Ade Stadium; West Lafayette, IN	W 31–29	60,159	
November 10	at Wisconsin		Camp Randall Stadium; Madison, WI	L 13–30	72,292	
November 17	Indiana		Ross–Ade Stadium; West Lafayette, IN (Old Oaken Bucket)	W 31–24	69,236	
December 31	vs. Virginia*		Atlanta–Fulton County Stadium; Atlanta, GA (Peach Bowl)	L 24–27	45,983	
*Non-conference game; ^{†}Homecoming; Rankings from AP Poll released prior to the game

== Game summaries ==
=== vs Notre Dame ===
#8 Notre Dame Fighting Irish (0–0) vs. Purdue Boilermakers (0–0)

Quarter	1	2	3	4	Total
Purdue	3	10	3	7	23
Notre Dame	14	0	0	7	21

at Hoosier Dome, Indianapolis, Indiana

- Date: September 8, 1984
- Game weather: Indoors (dome)
- Game attendance: 60,672
- Recap/Box Score

Game information

First quarter

- PUR – Mike Rendina 31-yard field goal, 13:16. Purdue 3–0. Drive: 3 plays, -1 yard, 1:38.
- ND – Allen Pinkett 11-yard run (John Carney kick), 7:55. Notre Dame 7–3. Drive: 10 plays, 77 yards, 5:21.
- ND – Mark Brooks 3-yard run (John Carney kick), 1:39. Notre Dame 14–3. Drive: 10 plays, 70 yards, 4:12.

Second quarter

- PUR – Jeff Price 6-yard pass from Jim Everett, 10:11. Notre Dame 14–10. Drive: 14 plays, 86 yards, 6:28.
- PUR – Mike Rendina 18-yard field goal, 0:00. Notre Dame 14–13. Drive: 13 plays, 62 yards, 5:59.

Third quarter

- PUR – Mike Rendina 20-yard field goal, 3:47. Purdue 16–14. Drive: 13 plays, 92 yards, 5:54.

Fourth quarter

- PUR – Jeff Price 14-yard pass from Jim Everett (Mike Rendina kick), 13:57. Purdue 23–14. Drive: 6 plays, 88 yards, 2:32.
- ND – Allen Pinkett 6-yard run (John Carney kick), 4:21. Purdue 23–21. Drive: 11 plays, 66 yards, 4:16.

Top passers

- PUR – Jim Everett – 20/28, 255 yards, 2 TD, INT
- ND – Steve Beuerlein – 13/20, 233 yards, 3 INT

Top rushers

- PUR – Rodney Carter – 22 rushes, 58 yards
- ND – Allen Pinkett – 22 rushes, 69 yards, 2 TD

Top receivers

- PUR – Steve Griffin – 5 receptions, 79 yards
- ND – Joe Howard – 3 receptions, 61 yards

External videos
- Television broadcast

=== Miami (FL) ===
Miami (FL) at Purdue

Team	1	2	3	4	Total
• No.5 Hurricanes	7	7	14	0	28
Boilermakers	10	7	0	0	17

- Date: September 14
- Location: Ross–Ade Stadium

Scoring summary
1	MIA	Highsmith 47-yard run (Cox kick)	MIA 7–0
1	PUR	Rendina 32-yard field goal	MIA 7–3
1	PUR	Wallace 4-yard run (Rendina kick)	PUR 10–3
2	MIA	Oliver 2-yard run (Cox kick)	Tie 10–10
2	PUR	Wallace 2-yard run (Rendina kick)	PUR 13–10
3	MIA	Kosar 1-yard run (Cox kick)	MIA 17–13
3	MIA	Highsmith 6-yard run (Cox kick)	MIA 24–13

=== Minnesota ===
- Ray Wallace 32 rushes, 158 yards

=== Michigan State ===
- Jim Everett 27/42, 335 yards

=== Ohio State ===
#2 Ohio State Buckeyes at Purdue Boilermakers

Quarter	1	2	3	4	Total
Ohio St	7	3	7	6	23
Purdue	7	0	7	14	28

at Ross–Ade Stadium, West Lafayette, Indiana

- Date: October 6, 1984
- Game time: 1:31 p.m.
- Game weather: Mostly cloudy, 74 °F (23 °C)
- Game attendance: 66,261
- Box Score

Game information

First quarter

- PUR – Steve Griffin 20-yard pass from Jim Everett (Mike Rendina kick), 14:00. Purdue 7–0. Drive: 5 plays, 70 yards, 1:00.
- OSU – Keith Byars 20-yard run (Rich Spangler kick), 4:09. Tie 7–7. Drive: 2 plays, 29 yards, 0:50.

Second quarter

- OSU – Rich Spangler 34-yard field goal, 0:02. Ohio St 10–7. Drive: 5 plays, 35 yards, 0:26.

Third quarter

- OSU – Keith Byars 14-yard run (Rich Spangler kick), 13:43. Ohio St 17–7. Drive: 3 plays, 37 yards, 1:20.
- PUR – Steve Griffin 65-yard pass from Jim Everett (Mike Rendina kick), Ohio St 17–14. Drive: 6 plays, 88 yards, 2:54.

Fourth quarter

- PUR – Bruce King 4-yard pass from Jim Everett (Mike Rendina kick), 14:03. Purdue 21–17. Drive: 8 plays, 79 yards, 3:43.
- PUR – Rod Woodson 55-yard interception return (Mike Rendina kick), 10:03. Purdue 28–17.
- OSU – Cris Carter 5-yard pass from Mike Tomczak (run failed), 2:35. Purdue 28–23. Drive: 5 plays, 49 yards, 0:52.

Top passers

- OSU – Mike Tomczak – 20/41, 280 yards, TD, 2 INT
- PUR – Jim Everett – 17/23, 257 yards, 3 TD, INT

Top rushers

- OSU – Keith Byars – 30 rushes, 191 yards, 2 TD
- PUR – Ray Wallace – 20 rushes, 89 yards

Top receivers

- OSU – Keith Byars – 9 receptions, 102 yards
- PUR – Steve Griffin – 6 receptions, 131 yards, 2 TD

=== Iowa ===
Iowa at Purdue

Team	1	2	3	4	Total
• Hawkeyes	6	13	21	0	40
No. 14 Boilermakers	3	0	0	0	3

- Date: October 13
- Location: Ross–Ade Stadium, West Lafayette, Indiana
- Game attendance: 66,359
- Game weather: 66 °F (19 °C), Cloudy with scattered showers, Wind SSW 12 mph (19 km/h)
- Referee: Jim Kemerling

Scoring summary
Q1	3:52	IOWA	Smith 51-yard pass from Long (kick failed)	IOWA 6–0
Q1	0:48	PUR	Rendina 32-yard field goal	IOWA 6–3
Q2	9:00	IOWA	Nichol 22-yard field goal	IOWA 9–3
Q2	3:03	IOWA	Helverson 56-yard pass from Long (Nichol kick)	IOWA 16–3
Q2	0:03	IOWA	Nichol 38-yard field goal	IOWA 19–3
Q3	7:49	IOWA	Smith 31-yard pass from Long (Nichol kick)	IOWA 26–3
Q3	4:20	IOWA	Smith 38-yard pass from Long (Nichol kick)	IOWA 33–3
Q3	3:31	IOWA	Harmon 3-yard run (Nichol kick)	IOWA 40–3

Iowa won in West Lafayette for the first time since 1956, snapping a 12-game losing skid at Ross–Ade Stadium.

=== Northwestern ===
- Jim Everett 25/35, 312 yards

=== Michigan ===
Team	1	2	3	4	Total
Michigan	0	0	7	22	29
• Purdue	7	17	0	7	31

- Date: November 3
- Location: Ross–Ade Stadium, West Lafayette, Indiana

Scoring summary
1	PUR	Beery 2-yard pass from Everett (Rendina kick)	PUR 7-0
2	PUR	Price 6-yard pass from Everett (Rendina kick)	PUR 14-0
2	PUR	Rendina 22-yard field goal	PUR 17-0
2	PUR	Medlock 1-yard run (Rendina kick)	PUR 24-0
3	MICH	Jokisch 15-yard pass from Zurbrugg (Bergeron kick)	PUR 24-7
4	PUR	Carter 16-yard run (Rendina kick)	PUR 31-7
4	MICH	Markray 13-yard pass from Zurbrugg (Bergeron kick)	PUR 31-14
4	MICH	Bean 15-yard pass from Zurbrugg (Zurbrugg to Bean pass)	PUR 31-22
4	MICH	Nelson 6-yard pass from Zurbrugg (Bergeron kick)	PUR 31-29

PUR: Steve Griffin 6 Rec, 112 yards

=== Wisconsin ===
- Jim Everett 23/49, 328 yards

=== Indiana ===
Team	1	2	3	4	Total
Indiana	14	0	3	7	24
• Purdue	7	7	10	7	31

- Date: November 17
- Location: Ross–Ade Stadium, West Lafayette, Indiana
- Game attendance: 69,236

Scoring summary
Q1	IND	Allen 25-yard pass from Bradley (Rogers kick)	IND 7–0
Q1	IND	Lilja 3-yard pass from Bradley (Rogers kick)	IND 14–0
Q1	PUR	Carter 1-yard run (Rendina kick)	IND 14–7
Q2	PUR	Wallace 4-yard run (Rendina kick)	Tie 14–14
Q3	PUR	Rendina 25-yard field goal	PUR 17–14
Q3	IND	Rogers 26-yard field goal	Tie 17–17
Q3	PUR	Everett 1-yard run (Rendina kick)	PUR 24–17
Q4	PUR	Griffin 27-yard pass from Everett (Rendina kick)	PUR 31–17
Q4	IND	Jones 37-yard pass from Bradley (Rogers kick)	PUR 31–24

- A grass fire was reported in the end-zone during the game as a result of a warming barrel tipping over.
- Rodney Carter 23 rushes, 148 yards
- Steve Griffin 6 receptions, 103 yards
- Jason Houston 16 solo tackles

== Roster ==
1984 Purdue Boilermakers football team roster
Players
Coaches
Offense

Pos.	#	Name	Class
OL		Paul Alekna
OL	77	John Morrell
OL		Drew Banks
TE		Jack Beery
OL		Jerry Boat
WR		Rick Brunner
RB		Rodney Carter
QB		Doug Downing
OL		Mark Drenth
QB	11	Jim Everett	Jr
RB		Jeff Feulner
WR		Steve Griffin
OL		Doug Isbell
WR	84	Mark Jackson	So
OL		Dave Jaumotte
RB	37	Bruce King (C)	Sr
RB		Lorenzo McCline
RB		James Medlock
WR		Jeff Price
TE		Brad Schumacher
TE		Marty Scott
OL		Rick Skibinski
OL		Pat Snyder
RB		Ray Wallace

Defense

Pos.	#	Name	Class
DB		Don Anderson
DL		Don Baldwin
DB	19	Cris Dishman	Fr
DL		Kevin Holley
DL		Brad Hornor
LB		Jason Houston (C)
DB		Jeff Lee
DL	91	Melvin Menke (C)	Sr
LB		Bill Mulchrone
DB		Tommy Lee Myers
LB	48	Fred Strickland	So
LB	44	Kevin Sumlin	So
DL		Tony Visco
LB		Merkle Williams
DB		Kennedy Wilson
DB	13	Corey Cooper
DL	99	Kevin Holley
DL		Derek Wimberly
DB	26	Rod Woodson	So
DL		Bob Ziltz

Special teams

Pos.	#	Name	Class
K		Mike Rendina
P		Brian Thornson

Head coach

- Leon Burtnett

Coordinators/assistant coaches

- Urban Bowman – Linebackers
- Jim Colletto
- Bill Doba
- Bob Spoo
- Joe Tiller

Legend

- (C) Team captain
- (S) Suspended
- (I) Ineligible
- Injured
- Redshirt
