= Mark Krerowicz =

American football player (born 1963)

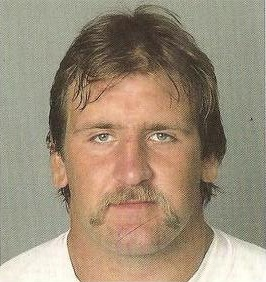

No. 63
- Position: Guard

Personal information
- Born: March 1, 1963 (age 63); Toledo, Ohio, U.S.
- Listed height: 6 ft 3 in (1.91 m)
- Listed weight: 285 lb (129 kg)

Career information
- High school: St. John's Jesuit (Toledo)
- College: Ohio State
- NFL draft: 1985: 6th round, 147th overall pick

Career history
- Cleveland Browns (1985); Buffalo Bills (1986)*; Cleveland Browns (1987); New York Jets (1988)
- * Offseason or practice squad member only

Awards and highlights
- Second-team All-Big Ten (1983)

Career NFL statistics
- Games played: 3
- Games started: 3
- Stats at Pro Football Reference

Mark Krerowicz (born March 1, 1963) is an American former professional football player who was a guard in the National Football League (NFL). He played college football for the Ohio State Buckeyes and was selected by the Cleveland Browns in the sixth round of the 1985 NFL draft. He played for the Browns in 1985 and 1987.
