= Owen Gill =

American football player (born 1962)

No. 44, 30
- Position: Running back

Personal information
- Born: February 19, 1962 (age 64); London, England
- Listed height: 6 ft 1 in (1.85 m)
- Listed weight: 230 lb (104 kg)

Career information
- High school: Samuel J. Tilden (Brooklyn, New York, U.S.)
- College: Iowa
- NFL draft: 1985: 2nd round, 53rd overall pick

Career history
- Seattle Seahawks (1985)*; Indianapolis Colts (1985–1986); Los Angeles Rams (1987); Tampa Bay Buccaneers (1988)*
- * Offseason or practice squad member only

Awards and highlights
- Second-team All-Big Ten (1984)

Career NFL statistics
- Rushing yards: 490
- Rushing average: 5
- Touchdowns: 3
- Stats at Pro Football Reference

Owen Gill (born February 19, 1962) is an English-American former professional football running back who played in the National Football League (NFL). He played college football for the Iowa Hawkeyes. He was selected by the Seattle Seahawks in the second round (53rd overall pick) of the 1985 NFL draft. He played for the Indianapolis Colts (1985–1986) and Los Angeles Rams (1987).

Born to Guyanese parents, Gill played cricket, soccer, and rugby while growing up in London. He moved to the United States in 1978. Gill was not initially attracted to football, not liking the stoppage after each play. He played football at Samuel J. Tilden High School in Brooklyn, New York City.
