= Bob Perryman =

American football player (1964–2023)

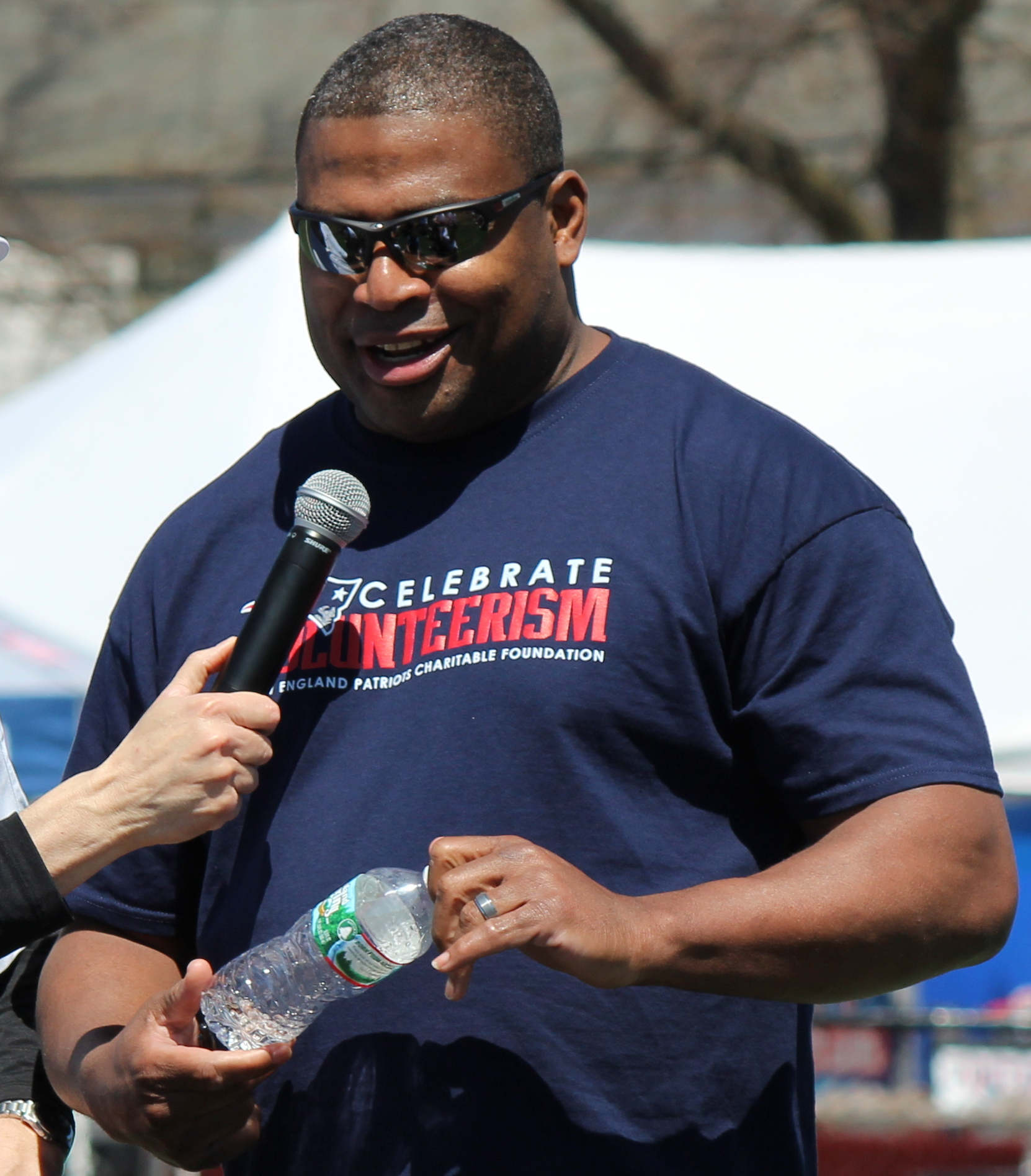
- Perryman in 2015

No. 34, 33
- Position: Fullback

Personal information
- Born: October 16, 1964; Raleigh, North Carolina, U.S.
- Died: February 23, 2023 (aged 58); Snellville, Georgia, U.S.
- Listed height: 6 ft 1 in (1.85 m)
- Listed weight: 233 lb (106 kg)

Career information
- High school: Bourne (Bourne, Massachusetts)
- College: Michigan
- NFL draft: 1987: 3rd round, 79th overall pick

Career history
- New England Patriots (1987–1990); Dallas Cowboys (1990); Denver Broncos (1991–1992)

Career NFL statistics
- Rushing yards: 1,338
- Receiving yards: 616
- Touchdowns: 9
- Stats at Pro Football Reference

Robert Lewis Perryman Jr. (October 16, 1964 – February 23, 2023) was an American professional football player. He played college football as a fullback for the University of Michigan from 1983 to 1986. He played professional football, principally as a fullback, in the National Football League (NFL) for six seasons for the New England Patriots (1987–1990) and the Denver Broncos (1991–1992). He gained 1,247 rushing yards at Michigan and 1,338 rushing yards in the NFL.

== Early life ==
Perryman was born in Raleigh, North Carolina, in 1964. He played high school football at Bourne High School in Bourne, Massachusetts.

== University of Michigan ==
Perryman enrolled at the University of Michigan in 1982 and played college football at the fullback position for head coach Bo Schembechler's Michigan Wolverines football teams from 1983 to 1986. He scored three touchdowns in the 1984 season opener against the #1 ranked Miami Hurricanes. He also rushed for 107 yards on 14 carries and scored two touchdowns against Hawaii in the final game of the 1986 season. In four years at Michigan, Perryman totaled 1,247 rushing yards and 14 touchdowns on 274 carries. He also caught 20 passes for 199 yards and one receiving touchdown.

== Professional football ==
Perryman was selected by the New England Patriots in the third round (79th overall pick) of the 1987 NFL draft. He played four years for the Patriots from 1987 to 1990, appearing in 49 games, including 38 games as a starter. He gained 1,294 rushing yards and scored nine touchdowns on 369 carries (3.5 yards per carry) for the Patriots. He also caught 64 passes for 430 yards while playing for the Patriots. Perryman, along with Patriots teammates Zeke Mowatt and Michael Timpson, were fined by the NFL for alleged sexual harassment stemming from a locker room interview involving Boston Herald reporter Lisa Olson in September 1990.

After being released by the Patriots, Perryman signed with the Dallas Cowboys during the 1990 season but did not appear in any games. Perryman concluded his NFL career with the Denver Broncos during the 1991 and 1992 NFL seasons. He appeared in 19 games for the Broncos (eight as a starter) and gained 44 yards on 24 carries.

== NFL career statistics ==
Legend
**Bold**	Career high

Year	Team	Games		Rushing					Receiving				
Year	Team	GP	GS	Att	Yds	Avg	Lng	TD	Rec	Yds	Avg	Lng	TD
1987	NWE	9	1	41	187	**4.6**	**48**	0	3	13	4.3	7	0
1988	NWE	**16**	**16**	146	448	3.1	16	**6**	17	134	7.9	18	0
1989	NWE	**16**	14	**150**	**562**	3.7	18	2	**29**	**195**	6.7	16	0
1990	NWE	8	7	32	97	3.0	13	1	15	88	5.9	15	0
1991	DEN	15	7	21	45	2.1	6	0	17	171	**10.1**	**24**	0
1992	DEN	4	1	3	-1	-0.3	1	0	2	15	7.5	9	0
Total		68	46	393	1,338	3.4	48	9	83	616	7.4	24	0

== Later life ==
After retiring from football, Perryman lived in North Andover, Massachusetts, with his wife and three children, Krista, Robert and Jason. He became an assistant coach for the Boston Militia in the Independent Women's Football League.

Perryman died on February 23, 2023, at the age of 58.
