= Jim Morrissey (American football) =

American football player (born 1962)

No. 51
- Position: Linebacker

Personal information
- Born: December 24, 1962 (age 63); Flint, Michigan, U.S.
- Listed height: 6 ft 3 in (1.91 m)
- Listed weight: 227 lb (103 kg)

Career information
- High school: Powers Catholic (Flint)
- College: Michigan State
- NFL draft: 1985: 11th round, 302nd overall pick

Career history
- Chicago Bears (1985–1993); Green Bay Packers (1993)

Awards and highlights
- Super Bowl champion (XX); First-team All-Big Ten (1984)

Career NFL statistics
- Interceptions: 9
- Fumble recoveries: 5
- Sacks: 1
- Stats at Pro Football Reference

James Michael Morrissey (born December 24, 1962) is an American former professional football player who was a linebacker in the National Football League (NFL). He played for the Chicago Bears from 1985 to 1993, and the Green Bay Packers in 1993. He played college football for the Michigan State Spartans before being selected by the Bears in the 11th round of the 1985 NFL draft with the 302nd overall pick. He was a member of the Bears team that won Super Bowl XX following the 1985 NFL season.
