= 1979 Miami Dolphins season =

14th season in franchise history

- Owner: Joe Robbie
- General manager: Mike Robbie
- Head coach: Don Shula
- Home stadium: Miami Orange Bowl

Results
- Record: 10–6
- Division place: 1st AFC East
- Playoffs: Lost Divisional Playoffs (at Steelers) 14–34
- Pro Bowlers: None

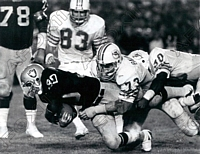
The Dolphins playing against the Oakland Raiders at the Oakland-Alameda County Coliseum in 1979

The 1979 Miami Dolphins season was the franchise's 10th season in the National Football League, the 14th overall, and the 10th under head coach Don Shula. Prior to the start of the season, the Dolphins re-signed Larry Csonka who left to join the WFL after the 1974 season. Despite struggles from Bob Griese all year, the Dolphins finished 10–6 and won their first division title in five years. Among the season highlights were the Dolphins' 19th and 20th consecutive wins over the Buffalo Bills. For the entire decade of the 1970s (1970–79), the Dolphins hold a perfect 20–0 record over the Bills, which contributed to O. J. Simpson never seeing any postseason success in his career. In the Divisional Playoffs, the Dolphins were no match for the Pittsburgh Steelers who jumped out to a 20–0 lead in the 1st Quarter to win 34–14 on their way to their second straight Super Bowl title.

The Dolphins failed to have a Pro Bowler this season.

== Offseason ==
=== NFL draft ===
1979 Miami Dolphins draft
Round	Pick	Player	Position	College	Notes
1	24	Jon Giesler	Offensive tackle	Michigan	
2	53	Jeff Toews	Guard	Washington	
3	61	Tony Nathan *	Running back	Alabama	
3	63	Mel Land	Linebacker	Michigan State	
3	65	Ronnie Lee	Offensive tackle	Baylor	
4	107	Steve Howell	Fullback	Baylor	
5	134	Don Bessillieu	Safety	Georgia Tech	
6	162	Steve Lindquist	Guard	Nebraska	
7	189	Uwe von Schamann	Placekicker	Oklahoma	
8	206	Jeff Groth	Wide receiver	Bowling Green	
8	215	Glenn Blackwood	Safety	Texas	
9	244	Jeff Weston	Offensive tackle	Notre Dame	
10	258	Jerome Stanton	Defensive back	Michigan State	
10	272	Mike Kozlowski	Safety	Colorado	
11	299	Mike Blanton	Defensive end	Georgia Tech	
12	327	Larry Fortner	Quarterback	Miami (OH)	
Made roster * Made at least one Pro Bowl during career

=== Undrafted free agents ===
1979 undrafted free agents of note
Player	Position	College
Greg Gordon	Cornerback	Wisconsin
Cleveland Green	Tackle	Southern
Derek Penn	Running back	Duke
Joel Williams	Linebacker	Wisconsin–La Crosse

== Personnel ==
=== Coaches / Staff ===
1979 Miami Dolphins staff
Front office: President – Joe Robbie; Executive vice president/general manager – Mike Robbie; Vice president – Don Shula; Director of player personnel – Chuck Connor; Head coaches: Head coach – Don Shula; Offensive coaches: Quarterbacks/receivers – Dan Henning; Offensive backs – Carl Taseff; Offensive line/running game – John Sandusky	Defensive coaches: Assistant head coach/defense – Bill Arnsparger; Defensive line/run defense – Mike Scarry; Defensive backs – Tom Keane; Special teams coaches: Special teams – Steve Crosby, Carl Taseff; Punting – Tom Keane

=== Roster ===
1979 Miami Dolphins roster
Quarterbacks (QB): 7 Guy Benjamin; 12 Bob Griese; 10 Don Strock; Running backs (RB): 39 Larry Csonka; 27 Gary Davis; 38 Steve Howell; 22 Tony Nathan; 38 Bob Torrey; 24 Delvin Williams; Wide receivers (WR): 81 Jimmy Cefalo; 82 Duriel Harris; 89 Nat Moore; Tight ends (TE): 84 Bruce Hardy; 86 Ronnie Lee	Offensive linemen (OL): 71 Mike Current T; 63 Mark Dennard C; 79 Jon Giesler T; 61 Cleveland Green T; 67 Bob Kuechenberg T; 68 Eric Laakso G/T; 66 Larry Little G; 64 Ed Newman G; 60 Jeff Toews G/T; Defensive linemen (DL): 78 Carl Barisich NT; 73 Bob Baumhower NT; 75 Doug Betters DE; 83 Vern Den Herder DE; 77 A. J. Duhe DE	Linebackers (LB): 58 Kim Bokamper OLB; 51 Rusty Chambers ILB; 50 Larry Gordon OLB; 52 Mel Land ILB; 53 Bob Matheson OLB; 54 Ralph Ortega ILB; 55 Earnie Rhone OLB; 56 Steve Towle ILB; Defensive backs (DB): 46 Don Bessillieu SS; 20 Neal Colzie FS; 25 Tim Foley SS; 37 Mike Kozlowski SS; 48 Gerald Small CB; 45 Ed Taylor CB; 41 Norris Thomas CB; Special teams (ST): 4 George Roberts P; 5 Uwe von Schamann K	Reserve: 49 Charlie Babb S (IR); 47 Glenn Blackwood S (IR); 31 Norm Bulaich RB (IR); 62 Jim Langer C (IR); 87 Andre Tillman TE (IR); Rookies in italics

== Regular season ==
=== Schedule ===
Week	Date	Opponent	Result	Record	Venue	Recap
1	September 2	at **Buffalo Bills**	**W** 9–7	1–0	Rich Stadium	Recap
2	September 9	Seattle Seahawks	**W** 19–10	2–0	Miami Orange Bowl	Recap
3	September 16	at Minnesota Vikings	**W** 27–12	3–0	Metropolitan Stadium	Recap
4	September 23	Chicago Bears	**W** 31–16	4–0	Miami Orange Bowl	Recap
5	September 30	at **New York Jets**	**L** 27–33	4–1	Shea Stadium	Recap
6	October 8	at Oakland Raiders	**L** 3–13	4–2	Oakland-Alameda County Coliseum	Recap
7	October 14	**Buffalo Bills**	**W** 17–7	5–2	Miami Orange Bowl	Recap
8	October 21	at **New England Patriots**	**L** 13–28	5–3	Schaefer Stadium	Recap
9	October 28	Green Bay Packers	**W** 27–7	6–3	Miami Orange Bowl	Recap
10	November 5	Houston Oilers	**L** 6–9	6–4	Miami Orange Bowl	Recap
11	November 11	**Baltimore Colts**	W 19–0	7–4	Miami Orange Bowl	Recap
12	November 18	at Cleveland Browns	**L** 24–30 (OT)	7–5	Cleveland Stadium	Recap
13	November 25	at **Baltimore Colts**	**W** 28–24	8–5	Memorial Stadium	Recap
14	November 29	**New England Patriots**	**W** 39–24	9–5	Miami Orange Bowl	Recap
15	December 9	at Detroit Lions	**W** 28–10	10–5	Pontiac Silverdome	Recap
16	December 15	**New York Jets**	**L** 24–27	10–6	Miami Orange Bowl	Recap
Note: Intra-division opponents are in **bold** text.

=== Standings ===
AFC East
	W	L	T	PCT	DIV	CONF	PF	PA	STK
^{(3)} Miami Dolphins	10	6	0	.625	5–3	6–6	341	257	L1
New England Patriots	9	7	0	.563	4–4	6–6	411	326	W1
New York Jets	8	8	0	.500	4–4	5–7	337	383	W3
Buffalo Bills	7	9	0	.438	4–4	5–7	268	279	L3
Baltimore Colts	5	11	0	.313	3–5	4–10	271	351	W1

== Playoffs ==
=== AFC Divisional Playoff: at Pittsburgh Steelers ===
Quarter	1	2	3	4	Total
Dolphins	0	0	7	7	14
Steelers	20	0	7	7	34

at Three Rivers Stadium, Pittsburgh, Pennsylvania

- Date: Sunday December 30, 1979
- Game time: 12:30 pm EST
- Game attendance: 50,214
- Referee: Cal Lepore
- TV announcers (NBC): Don Criqui (play by play), John Brodie (color commentator)

Game information
- Pittsburgh – Thornton 1 run (Bahr kick)
- Pittsburgh – Stallworth 17 pass from Bradshaw (kick blocked)
- Pittsburgh – Swann 20 pass from Bradshaw (Bahr kick)
- Miami – Harris 7 pass from Griese (von Schamann kick)
- Pittsburgh – Bleier 1 run (Bahr kick)
- Pittsburgh – Harris 5 run (Bahr kick)
- Miami – Csonka 1 run (von Schamann kick)

== Awards and honors ==
Larry Csonka returned to the Dolphins in 1979 for one last season before retiring, after leaving in 1975 for the World Football League and spending the next three seasons after with the New York Giants. He led the team with 837 rushing yards and 12 touchdowns, in addition to one receiving touchdown. His return led to him being named the NFL Comeback Player of the Year.
