= History of the Miami Dolphins =

Sports team history

The Miami Dolphins are a professional American football franchise which competes in the National Football League (NFL) as a member club of the league's American Football Conference (AFC) East division. The team's headquarters, stadium and training facilities are all co-located in Miami Gardens, Florida. The Dolphins' team was founded by attorney-politician Joe Robbie and actor-comedian Danny Thomas. The Dolphins began play in the American Football League (AFL) in 1966. South Florida did not have a professional football team since the days of the Miami Seahawks, who played in the All-America Football Conference (AAFC) East Division in 1946 before becoming the first incarnation of the Baltimore Colts.

== The late 1960s: Origins ==
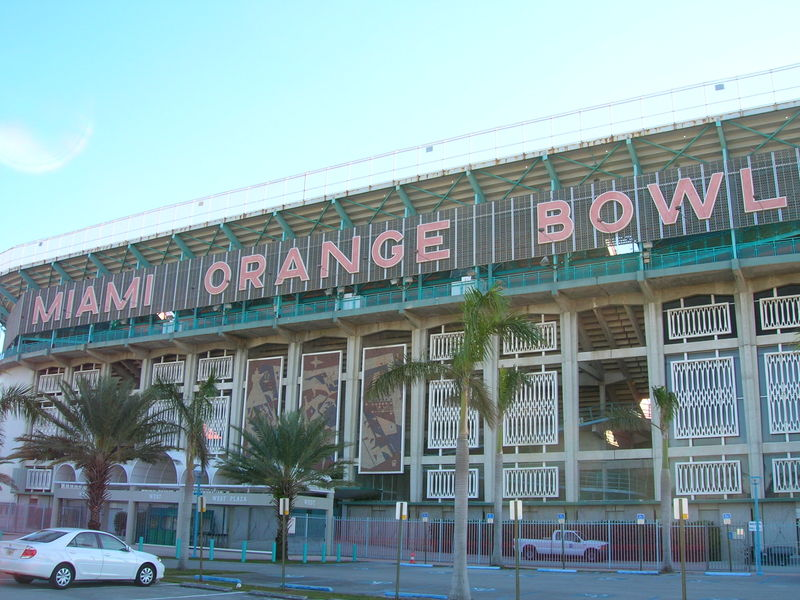
The Miami Orange Bowl, home of the Dolphins from their founding until 1987.

The first professional American football team to be based in Miami and the state of Florida was the Miami Seahawks. The Seahawks entered the All-America Football Conference (AAFC) during its inaugural 1946 season, as the first major league-level sports franchise ever in Miami. However, the team lasted only one year before being confiscated by the league.

Miami had been a target for the American Football League from its earliest stages. Ralph Wilson, one of the league's founding owners, had hoped to establish his franchise in Miami when he acquired his stake in 1959. However, he was unable to secure a lease to a suitable stadium to host professional football games. As was the case in 1946, the only stadium large enough was the Orange Bowl (called Burdine Stadium during the Seahawks' brief tenancy there) but municipal officials were unwilling to risk a repeat of the AAFC fiasco and told Wilson only college teams would be permitted to play there. This led Wilson to abandon Miami and instead establish the Buffalo Bills in Buffalo, New York. The fledgling AFL maintained its interest in Miami however, and in 1962 staged a preseason exhibition game between the Houston Oilers and the Dallas Texans. By 1965, the AFL was clearly a much more sustainable venture than the previous AAFC and as such local government resistance to a professional team playing at the Orange Bowl had subsided. The AFL awarded an expansion team to lawyer Joe Robbie and actor Danny Thomas. They agreed to pay the AFL $7.5 million for their franchise, an astonishing three hundred times the $25,000 the eight original AFL owners had paid for the league's charter franchises.

Robbie had originally wanted to establish the new franchise in Philadelphia, but encountered resistance from the other AFL owners since Philadelphia was already home to an established NFL team. The decade had not only seen the relocations of the AFL's Texans and Los Angeles Chargers due to local NFL competition, but even that of the NFL's long-established Chicago Cardinals while the Oakland Raiders and New York Titans initially only barely survived. Such experiences had left the AFL to doubt whether a city such as Philadelphia would support two professional football teams. Moreover, while by 1965 the NFL was already seriously entertaining merger discussions with its rival, the future of the AFL's two remaining teams in shared markets was a major sticking point which the AFL commissioner Joe Foss did not wish to aggravate further.

At the suggestion of Foss, Robbie agreed to court Miami due to its warm climate, growing population, and lack of a football team. Robbie was soon able to secure a lease for the Orange Bowl, and Thomas would eventually sell his stake in the team to Robbie. A contest was held in 1965 to choose the name of the team, which elicited 19,843 entries and over a thousand different names. The winning name, "Dolphins", was submitted by 622 entrants. During the summer of 1966, the Dolphins' training camp was in St. Pete Beach with practices in August at Boca Ciega High School in Gulfport.

The Dolphins' first head coach was George Wilson, former coach of the Detroit Lions. Under Wilson, the Dolphins had a combined 15–39–2 record in four seasons.

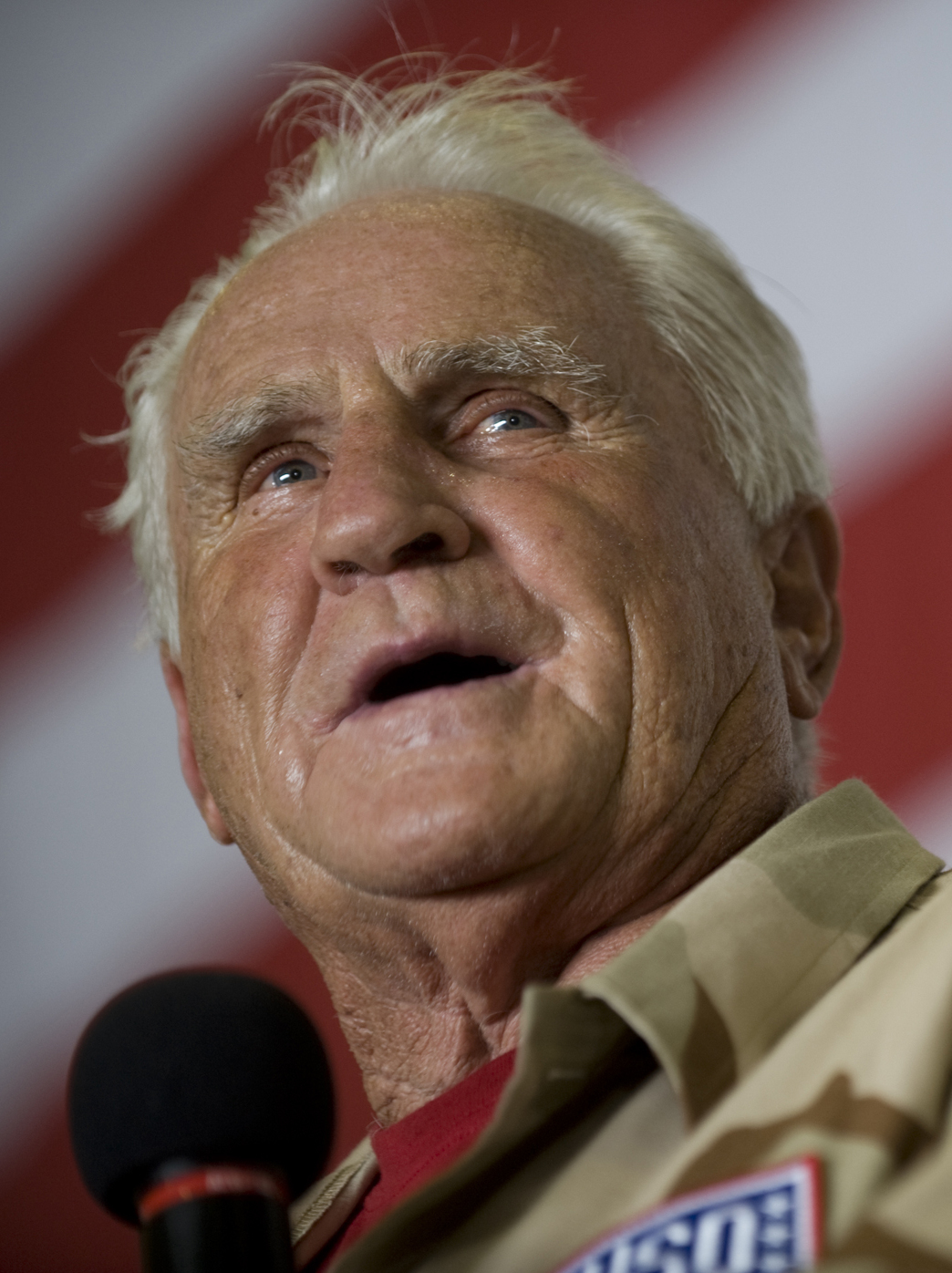
Head coach Don Shula enjoyed a 25-year career with the Dolphins, making the team one of the most successful in the NFL.

== The 1970s: The 'perfect season' and the Super Bowl titles ==
Upon joining the NFL in 1970, the Dolphins hired Don Shula, a former Paul Brown disciple who had been lured from the Baltimore Colts after losing Super Bowl III two seasons earlier to the AFL's New York Jets and finishing 8–5–1 the following season, as their head coach. The Colts were enraged, especially since they had agreed upon the merger to move to the new American Football Conference and become the Dolphins' division rivals. They charged the Dolphins with tampering in gaining Shula. NFL Commissioner Pete Rozelle awarded Baltimore Miami's first round draft pick in 1971 as compensation.

Shula introduced himself to the Miami press by saying ‘that he didn't have any magic formulas and that the only way he knew to make his teams successful was through hard work.’ Shula's early training camps with the Dolphins seemed to have improved the Miami Dolphins to a 10–4 record and their first-ever playoff appearance, losing 21–14 at Oakland.

The Dolphins were a successful team during the early 1970s, becoming the first team to advance to the Super Bowl for three consecutive seasons. They captured the AFC championship in 1971 behind quarterback Bob Griese and wide receiver Paul Warfield. The AFC Divisional Playoff Game, in which the Dolphins defeated the Kansas City Chiefs 27–24, was the longest contest in NFL history (82 minutes 40 seconds). The Dolphins then shut out the Colts 21–0 in the AFC Championship game at the Orange Bowl. In Super Bowl VI, however, Miami lost to the Dallas Cowboys 24–3.

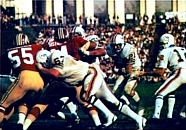
The Dolphins finished their perfect season by defeating the Redskins in Super Bowl VII.

In 1972, the Dolphins completed the NFL's first and only perfect season, winning every regular season game, two playoff games, and Super Bowl VII, defeating the Washington Redskins 14–7 (the 1948 Cleveland Browns had accomplished an undefeated season, but as members of the All-America Football Conference). During this season, Griese suffered a broken ankle in Week 5 versus the San Diego Chargers and was replaced by veteran Earl Morrall for the rest of the regular season, with Griese returning to the field as a substitute during the AFC Championship game versus the Pittsburgh Steelers and would once again start for Miami in Super Bowl VII. On the ground, running backs Larry Csonka and Mercury Morris became the first teammates to each rush 1,000 yards in a season. The offensive line included future Hall of Fame members Jim Langer and Larry Little, and Pro Bowler Bob Kuechenberg. The 1972 Dolphins defensive unit, called the No-Name Defense because Miami's impressive offense received much more publicity, was the league's best that year. It was led by linebacker Nick Buoniconti, end Bill Stanfill, and safeties Dick Anderson and Jake Scott. The Dolphins defeated the Cleveland Browns 20–14 at the Orange Bowl, then knocked off the Steelers 21–17 at Three Rivers Stadium to advance to Super Bowl VII. The only blemish in Miami's Super Bowl victory over Washington came from their placekicker, Garo Yepremian. Late in the 4th quarter, with the Dolphins leading 14–0, Yepremian attempted a 42-yard field goal, which was blocked. Yepremian picked up the loose ball, and attempted to pass, but the ball slipped out of his hands, and after batting it up in the air, the ball was grabbed by Redskins cornerback Mike Bass, who returned it for a touchdown. The Dolphins were able to hold on for a 14–7 victory.

The Dolphins finished 12–2 after the 1973 regular season and repeated as NFL champions, beating the Minnesota Vikings 24–7 in Super Bowl VIII at Rice Stadium in Houston. Miami reached the playoffs again in 1974 but lost in the first round to the Oakland Raiders, in what has entered NFL lore as the "Sea of Hands" game, considered one of the greatest games ever played. This devastating loss, which Shula called his toughest ever (he cried in the locker room after the game) and which haunts Dolphin players and fans to this day, marked the end of the Dolphins' dynasty. It would be eight years before the Dolphins would win another playoff game. After the disappointing defeat, several players, including Csonka, Warfield, and running back Jim Kiick, joined the short-lived World Football League. The Dolphins managed to win ten games in 1975, aided by Griese's consistency and the fine play of wide receiver Nat Moore. They did not make the playoffs, however, losing on tiebreakers to the Baltimore Colts.

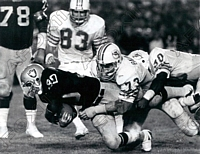
The Dolphins playing against the Oakland Raiders in 1979.

Miami rebounded from a 6–8 losing record in 1976 by winning ten or more games in four of the next five seasons. Shula built a solid defense around a new set of stars, including linebacker A. J. Duhe and linemen Bob Baumhower and Doug Betters. The Dolphins went 10–4 again in 1977 but again lost the division title (and playoff spot) to the Colts. They made the playoffs as a wild card in 1978 but lost in the first round to the Houston Oilers 17–9.

Csonka returned to the Dolphins in time for the 1979 season. After winning the AFC East division with a 10–6 record, the Dolphins lost the divisional playoff 34–14 to the eventual Super Bowl champion Pittsburgh Steelers at Three Rivers Stadium.

The Dolphins also accomplished another feat never done before or since by another NFL team. They beat the division rival Buffalo Bills 20 consecutive times in the 1970s. The Bills were "0 for the seventies" against the Dolphins.

== The 1980s: The Marino era (part 1) ==
In 1980, David Woodley, an athletic quarterback out of LSU, took over for Bob Griese, who severely injured his shoulder in a game against the Baltimore Colts. Griese would never play again, retiring after the season. The Dolphins finished 8–8 and did not make the playoffs. Their season ender with the Jets was notable for being the only NFL game ever broadcast without commentary.

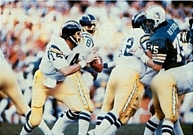
The Dolphins facing the Chargers in the 1981 AFC Divisional Playoff, known as the "Epic in Miami".

The Dolphins were back on top of the AFC East in 1981 with an 11–4–1 record. That season, the Dolphins' quarterback position was actually manned by both Woodley and backup Don Strock, causing the local media to identify the Miami quarterbacks as "Woodstrock." They reached the divisional playoff against the San Diego Chargers, regarded as one of the most memorable games in NFL history, known as The Epic in Miami. After being down 24–0 after the end of the 1st quarter, Strock entered the game for an ineffective Woodley and engineered a frenetic comeback, which included the historic "Hook and Lateral" play, in which wide receiver Duriel Harris caught a pass from Strock and immediately lateraled the ball to the streaking running back Tony Nathan for the score on the last play of the first half, which cut the Chargers lead to 24–17. After the Dolphins took the lead in the 4th quarter, San Diego tied it up 38–38 with under a minute to play. Chargers tight end Kellen Winslow, playing through exhaustion, blocked Uwe von Schamann's field goal try on the last play of regulation. Von Schamann had another field goal attempt blocked in overtime, and Rolf Benirschke kicked the game-winner for San Diego late in overtime. Strock finished the game with 403 passing yards and 4 touchdowns.

In the strike-shortened 1982 season, the Dolphins, led by the "Killer B's" defense ( Bob Baumhower, Charles Bowser, Bill Barnett, brothers Lyle Blackwood and Glenn Blackwood, Kim Bokamper, Doug Betters, and Bob Brudzinski), held five of their nine opponents to 14 or fewer points en route to their fourth Super Bowl appearance. During the first two rounds of the playoffs, they got revenge for previous losses, crushing the New England Patriots 28–13 (revenge for the infamous Snowplow Game at Schaeffer Stadium played earlier in the season) and the San Diego Chargers 34–13 at the Orange Bowl. Late in the season, in a snowy game against the Patriots, a convicted felon on work-release cleared a path for Patriots kicker John Smith to score the game-winning field goal. In the first round in Miami, they met again, with the Dolphins winning easily. In the second round against San Diego, the Dolphins got revenge for their loss the previous year, winning even more handily. After shutting out the New York Jets in the AFC Championship 14–0 behind three interceptions by A. J. Duhe, they lost Super Bowl XVII to the Washington Redskins, 27–17. After enjoying success rooted in a defense-first philosophy, and employing a ball control offense to take pressure off of lackluster quarterbacks, the next 17 seasons would be marked by an average rushing game and defense that limited a great quarterback.

The Dolphins began 1983 with the offense struggling. In the season opener at Buffalo, David Woodley passed for only 40 yards, and they had to simply kick their way to victory with four FGs in a 12–0 win. Although he played well against New England in Week 2, a loss to the Los Angeles Raiders prompted Don Shula to bench him in favor of rookie Dan Marino, drafted out of the University of Pittsburgh, who went on to win the AFC passing title helped by a ratio of 20 touchdowns versus 6 interceptions and Rookie of the Year award. Seldom sacked by defenders, Marino was protected by an outstanding offensive line as he passed to receivers such as Mark Clayton and Mark Duper, who were known collectively as "The Marks Brothers." Despite the regular season success (the Dolphins went 12–4 winning their last five regular season games and was the only team in the AFC East with a winning record), they were upset in the divisional playoffs by the Seattle Seahawks at the Orange Bowl. Defensive end Doug Betters was named the NFL's Defensive Player of the Year.

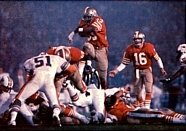
The Dolphins facing the 49ers in Super Bowl XIX.

In 1984, the Dolphins won their first 11 games en route to a 14–2 season (the franchise's best 16-game season to date). Marino, in his first full season, produced the most impressive set of passing statistics in NFL history, setting single-season records for most yards (5,084), touchdown passes (48), and completions (362). He was voted NFL MVP. Miami avenged the Seattle Seahawks 31–10 and crushed the Pittsburgh Steelers 45–28 in the playoffs to get to Super Bowl XIX. In the title game, however, Miami lost to the San Francisco 49ers 38–16. It would be Marino's only Super Bowl appearance and the Dolphins' last one to date.

In 1985, Miami finished 12–4 and was the only team that beat the 15–1 Chicago Bears all year. After just getting by the Cleveland Browns 24–21 after rallying from a 21–3 third quarter deficit in the divisional playoffs, many people were looking forward to a rematch with Chicago in Super Bowl XX. The Cinderella New England Patriots, the Dolphins' opponents in the AFC Championship, had different plans. New England forced six turnovers on the way to a 31–14 win, the Pats' first in Miami since 1966, snapping an 18-game losing streak facing the Fins at the Orange Bowl (not counting a 1969 win at Tampa Stadium, where the Fins were designated the home team.)

In 1986, the Dolphins, hampered by defensive struggles, stumbled to a 2–5 start and finished 8–8 and missed the playoffs for the first time since 1980. The Dolphins lost their Orange Bowl finale to the New England Patriots 34–27 on Monday Night Football. The problems continued in 1987, with an 8–7 record in a strike-shortened year (7–5 in non-strike games), their first at the new Joe Robbie Stadium. In 1988, Miami had its first losing season (6–10) in 12 years, then finished 8–8 following the 1989 season.

== The 1990s: The Marino era (part 2) ==
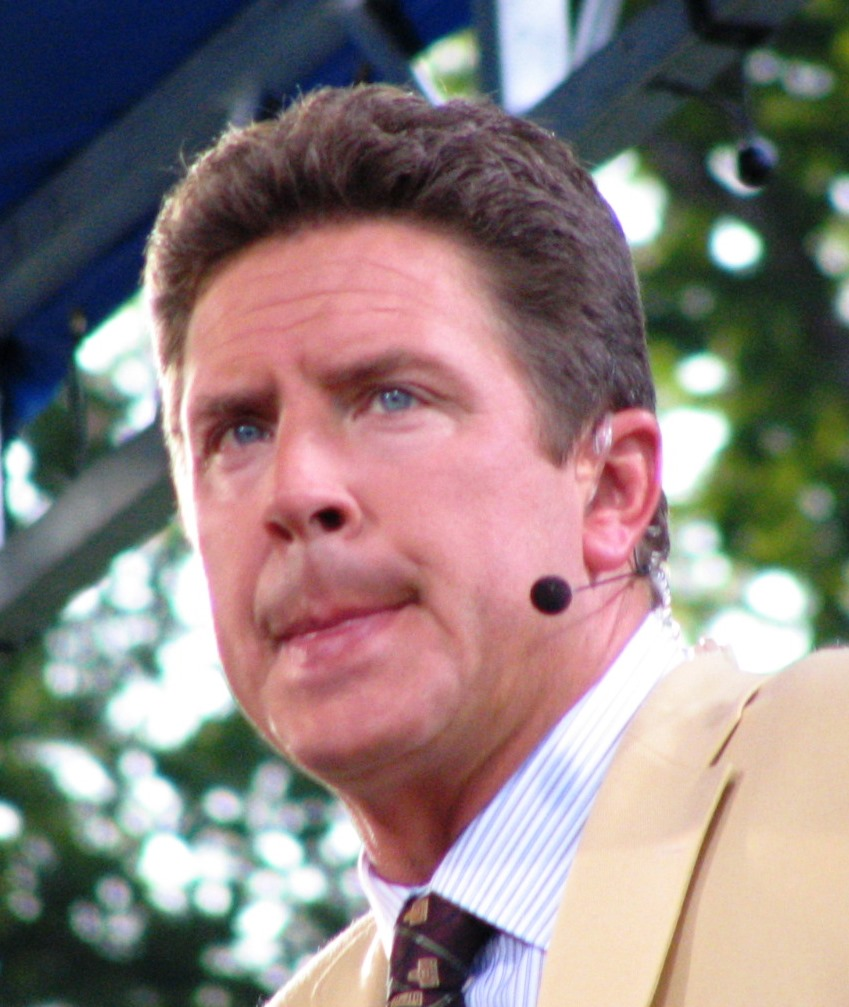
Drafted as part of the "Quarterback class of 1983", Dan Marino set numerous passing records and was the face of the Dolphins until his retirement after the 1999 season.

By 1990, the Dolphins had finally shaped up on defense and finished with a 12–4 record, second in the AFC East. They beat the Kansas City Chiefs 17–16 in the wild card round, but lost to the Buffalo Bills 44–34 in the divisional playoff. The team struggled with defensive injuries in 1991, and narrowly missed the playoffs on an overtime loss to the New York Jets in the final week of the season.

The Dolphins finished 11–5 in 1992, capturing the AFC East title behind Mark Higgs having his best season as a running back and tight end Keith Jackson (acquired as an unrestricted free agent from the Philadelphia Eagles) leading the team in receiving. They beat the Chargers in the divisional playoffs 31–0, but were defeated by the Buffalo Bills 29–10 in the AFC Championship.

1993 turned into a disastrous year for the Dolphins. Both Marino and backup quarterback Scott Mitchell suffered injuries, and following a memorable win over Dallas on Thanksgiving Day with Steve DeBerg as starting quarterback, Miami lost its final 5 games, including their must-win season finale in overtime at New England, to miss the playoffs at 9–7.

With Marino back for the 1994 season, the Dolphins won the AFC East again with a 10–6 record. After beating the Kansas City Chiefs in the wild card round 27–17, they suffered a last-second loss to the San Diego Chargers in the divisional playoff, 22–21, where the locker room lights "failed" at halftime at San Diego/Jack Murphy Stadium.

In 1995, Marino broke the career passing records formerly held by Fran Tarkenton for yards (48,841), touchdowns (352), and completions (3,913). The Dolphins finished 9–7, second in the AFC East, but still made the playoffs as a wild card, losing to Buffalo 37–22 in the first round. Following the season, Don Shula (pressed to retire) became an executive in the Dolphins’ front office. Jimmy Johnson, who had won a collegiate national championship at the University of Miami and two Super Bowls with the Dallas Cowboys, was named as Shula's replacement.

In 1996, Miami finished 8–8 and out of the playoffs, with rookie Karim Abdul-Jabbar's 1,116-yard rushing season one of the lone bright spots. In 1997, Miami stumbled late and backed into the playoffs with a 9–7 season, losing to the New England Patriots 17–3 in the wild card round.

Miami had a solid 10–6 season in 1998 with a career season for receiver O.J. McDuffie, but it was not enough to get past the New York Jets into first place in the division. The Dolphins beat the Bills 24–17 in the wild card round, but lost in the next round to the eventual champion Denver Broncos, 38–3 (the Broncos lost only two regular season games in 1998, one of which was to the Dolphins).

In 1999, Marino was injured during a game in which backup quarterback Damon Huard led a comeback. During the previous two years, the Broncos had won the Super Bowl, ending years of futility for their quarterback, John Elway. Marino was now being hailed as the next great success story, but it was not to be. Miami proceeded to go 2–6 in their last eight games, but still backed into the playoffs at 9–7. After a close 20–17 win at Seattle in the wild card round, the Dolphins faced the Jacksonville Jaguars in the divisional round and suffered a disastrous 62–7 rout, the second most lopsided postseason game in NFL history after the 1940 NFL Championship. Marino subsequently announced his retirement, and head coach Jimmy Johnson also left the team.

== 2000–2011: The post-Marino era ==
Following Dan Marino's retirement, the Dolphins shuffled thirteen quarterbacks and five head coaches during the 2000s, only making the postseason three times during that decade.

=== 2000–2004: Dave Wannstedt's tenure as coach ===
==== 2000 ====
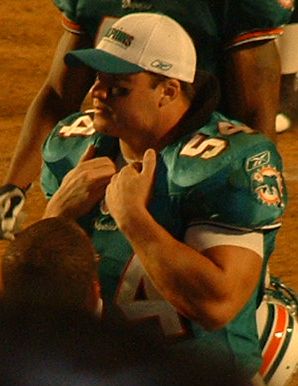
Zach Thomas contributed heavily to the Dolphins' 2000 and 2001 playoff runs.

Before the 2000 season, Dave Wannstedt, formerly of the Chicago Bears, became the new head coach, and ex-Jacksonville Jaguars backup Jay Fiedler became the new starting quarterback, even though Damon Huard had been considered the favorite. Despite lowered expectations, the defense broke through with Jason Taylor and Trace Armstrong each getting 10 sacks, and four players (Sam Madison, Brian Walker, Brock Marion, and Patrick Surtain) tallying at least five interceptions. In addition, Lamar Smith rushed for 1,139 yards, and Miami finished atop the AFC East with an 11–5 record. In the first round of the playoffs, Miami took the Indianapolis Colts to overtime and won 23–17 on a Lamar Smith touchdown run, in their last playoff win as of the 2020 season. Smith finished with an NFL postseason record 40 carries for 209 yards. However, in the divisional playoffs, the Dolphins were shut out by the Oakland Raiders 27–0, and Smith was barely able to run.

==== 2001 ====
The 2001 offseason brought in rookie Chris Chambers at wide receiver, but Trace Armstrong left for Oakland, as did two offensive linemen, Richmond Webb, a Pro Bowl anchor since 1990, and Kevin Donnalley, who left for Cincinnati and Carolina respectively. On February 1, 2001, the Dolphins placed the franchise tag on Jason Taylor for $5.39 million. Later in July 2001 the Dolphins were able to sign Taylor to a long-term 6-year $42 million deal. Also, shortly before the season started in August, the Dolphins traded for QB Cade McNown and a 2002 7th-round draft pick from the Chicago Bears for a 2002 and 2003 6th-round draft picks.

In the 2001 season, the Dolphins finished 11–5. A struggling offensive line play and a pedestrian offense kept Miami from being successful running the ball, and the Dolphins were shut out twice on the year. Despite it all, the solid defense kept them in it and they earned a wild card with an 11–5 record, finishing second in the AFC East title behind the eventual Super Bowl champion New England Patriots. The Dolphins lost in the first round of the playoffs 20–3 to the Baltimore Ravens.

==== 2002 ====
Miami revitalized its running game in time for the 2002 season by trading for New Orleans Saints running back Ricky Williams. In addition, rookie tight end Randy McMichael had a productive season. The Dolphins, behind a new offensive scheme under freshly hired offensive coordinator Norv Turner, who replaced Chan Gailey, and a power running game led by Williams, quickly rushed out to a 5–1 start, including an incredible last-minute comeback by Fiedler against the Broncos. However, Fiedler injured his thumb and sat out for an extended period of time. This had excited many Dolphins fans, as many believed backup Ray Lucas could outdo the much-maligned Fiedler. However, Lucas was abysmal in his first two games and merely average in his third, and the team dropped three straight. Miami rebounded with wins over Baltimore and an impressive thumping of San Diego, but lost to Buffalo. Still, Miami pulled off an impressive win over the Oakland Raiders and sat at 9–5 with two weeks left in the season, in prime position to steal the AFC East. However, in Week 17, despite dominating the New England Patriots for most of the game, the Dolphins blew an 11-point 4th-quarter lead and eventually lost in overtime. Due to a tiebreaker, both the Dolphins and Patriots lost out on the playoffs as the Jets took the AFC East title. Fans wanted Wannstedt's firing, but he was kept on for the 2003 season. Despite it all, the team believed it had plenty to look forward to, as Williams broke Dolphins records with 1,853 rushing yards and 16 touchdowns on the ground. The real culprit of Miami's demise was its poor play on the road, in which the team finished 2–6 and the defense surrendered over 8 yards a game.

==== 2003 ====
The 2003 Miami Dolphins featured a stout defense that was adept at creating turnovers and stopping the run. However, poor offensive line play (despite most of the starters returning) gave little room for Ricky Williams to run, and the offense was stagnant. The Dolphins began with a repeat of 2002's season end, with a complete meltdown against the Houston Texans, but they rebounded to win four straight games. During a crushing overtime loss at the hands of the Patriots, Jay Fiedler was injured, forcing newly acquired backup Brian Griese to lead the Dolphins to victory the next week over San Diego. That, however, was Griese's high point, and after a good showing against Indianapolis in a losing effort, he was lousy against the Tennessee Titans and highly ineffective against the Ravens. When Griese had the Dolphins losing to the mediocre Washington Redskins, Fiedler came off the bench and saved their season, leading them to a comeback victory, 24–23. Miami looked like it might rebound, with a victory that same week over the Dallas Cowboys to take them to 8–4, but two key losses to the Patriots and the Eagles ended Miami's chances at the playoffs, despite a 10–6 record.

==== 2004 ====
The 2004 offseason was disastrous for the Dolphins. Tight end Randy McMichael was arrested for domestic violence and wide receiver David Boston (signed from San Diego) suffered an injury in training camp and missed the entire season (Boston also failed a drug test for steroids later in the season). But the biggest shock came when Ricky Williams retired for then-unspecified reasons, until it was eventually revealed that a) Williams had recently suffered his third strike under the NFL's substance abuse policy, and b) to a lesser degree felt he was unnecessarily overused by Wannstedt. Many experts predicted a disastrous season for the Dolphins. These predictions proved right as the Dolphins dropped their first six games of the season, marking the worst start in franchise history. After a 1–8 start, Wannstedt resigned on November 9, 2004. He was replaced on an interim basis by defensive coordinator Jim Bates. The Dolphins fared better under Bates, winning three of their final seven games, including a 29–28 upset victory over the defending champion Patriots on December 20 in a nationally televised Monday Night Football contest. Despite this, the Dolphins decided not to hire Bates for the permanent coaching position. Instead, they hired LSU coach Nick Saban.

=== 2005–2007: Nick Saban's NFL coaching stint and the worst season in franchise history ===
==== 2005 ====
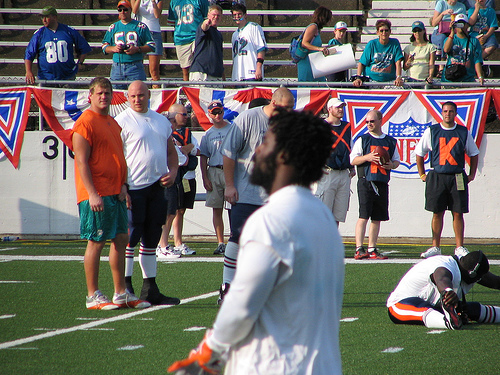
Ricky Williams on August 8, 2005 at his first game back from retirement

In 2005, the offseason saw many changes for the Dolphins as Saban began to mold the team in his image. The team selected Auburn running back Ronnie Brown in the first round of the 2005 NFL draft. The Dolphins also signed veteran quarterback Gus Frerotte, who would win the starting job over A.J. Feeley, who was a disappointment in 2004, after Miami gave up a second-round pick to the Philadelphia Eagles in exchange for Feeley. At the 2005 trade deadline, Feeley and a seventh-rounder were dealt to the San Diego Chargers for Cleo Lemon. Cornerback Patrick Surtain was traded to the Kansas City Chiefs in exchange for their second-round pick. Finally, Ricky Williams returned to the team. However, he had to sit out the first four games of the 2005 season due to violations of the NFL's substance abuse policy that he had ducked out on in 2004.

The Dolphins began their 2005 regular season with a bang. The Dolphins won their Week 1 home-opener against the Denver Broncos 34–10, giving Nick Saban his very first NFL win. Despite going on the road and losing to division rival New York Jets (17–7), the Dolphins won a tough game at home against the Carolina Panthers 27–24. After their Week 4 bye, they lost their next two road games to their division rival Buffalo Bills (20–14) and the Tampa Bay Buccaneers (27–13). Not even Ricky Williams's return against the Bucs was enough.

On Friday, October 21, the Dolphins had to play their home game against the Kansas City Chiefs two days early, because of Hurricane Wilma. The Dolphins lost 30–20, making them 0–3 in home games that had to be rescheduled because of a hurricane since the 2004 season. They would win next week at LSU's Tiger Stadium against the New Orleans Saints 21–6, but would lose their next three games. During that time, they lost two home games to the Atlanta Falcons (17–10) and their division rival New England Patriots (23–16) before getting shut out on the road against the Cleveland Browns (22–0). When things looked grim, the Dolphins regrouped and began gaining steam, winning six games in a row. First, they won on the road against the Oakland Raiders (33–21). Then Miami gained a measure of revenge against their division rival Buffalo Bills at home (24–23) with a late fourth quarter comeback engineered by backup quarterback Sage Rosenfels, Then the Dolphins pulled off an upset victory over the San Diego Chargers (23–21). Finally Miami beat the New York Jets by a score of 24–20, extending their winning streak to four games. The win also put them at the .500 mark (7–7), although wins by the Pittsburgh Steelers and San Diego Chargers put them out of playoff contention. The next week, on Christmas Eve, they achieved their fifth victory in a row with a 24–10 victory over the Tennessee Titans, which guaranteed them not to finish with a losing record. The team closed out their 40th season with a 28–26 victory at New England to finish the 2005 campaign at 9–7. On a side note, this was the first time since December 24, 2000 that the Dolphins were able to beat the Patriots in Foxborough.

==== 2006 ====
In the offseason the Dolphins showed major interest in signing free agent quarterback Drew Brees; however, Miami was unsure if Brees' shoulder was completely healed from a labrum tear he suffered with the San Diego Chargers. The Dolphins ended negotiations and traded for Minnesota Vikings QB Daunte Culpepper instead. Years later, Brees won a Super Bowl with his new team, the New Orleans Saints; and broke several NFL passing records. In contrast, Culpepper never recovered from the devastating knee injury he suffered in 2005, was benched after the fourth game of the season and eventually put on injured reserve. During the preseason, Sports Illustrated touted the Dolphins to be one of the teams heading to the Super Bowl XLI. They were predicted to lose by a field goal to the Carolina Panthers in their own Dolphin Stadium. In Saban's second season, the Dolphins were expected to contend for a playoff spot. The season turned out to be a major disappointment. Before the season began, Ricky Williams tested positive for the 4th time for violating the NFLs substance abuse policy, ending his season. The season started out with a rough loss to the defending Super Bowl champions, the Pittsburgh Steelers. The Dolphins went on to start the season with a record of 1–6. However, they had seemed to have turned something around midseason, much like the previous year's late-season surge. However, with a 6–8 record after a loss to Buffalo in Week 15, they were assured to once again miss the playoffs. The team finished 6–10 after a loss to the Colts in their final game. On January 3, 2007, Saban announced that he had accepted a contract for eight years and a guaranteed $5 million to coach at the University of Alabama. Saban left despite making several public statements in the preceding weeks assuring fans and owner Wayne Huizenga that he would be staying on as coach. Cam Cameron, previously the offensive coordinator for the Chargers, was hired as the new head coach.

==== 2007: Rock bottom ====
The Dolphins hit rock bottom in 2007, losing 13 games in a row to start the season. Five of those losses were by three points or less. A loss to Buffalo in Week 10 sealed their fate for the season, and the next game was a rare 3–0 defeat in Pittsburgh. A win in Week 15 over the Baltimore Ravens ensured that the Dolphins would not have a winless season, but they dropped their last two games to finish 1–15, the worst record in franchise history. However, six of the team's losses in 2007 were by margins of three points or less. Late in the season, two-time Super Bowl winning coach Bill Parcells was named Executive Vice President of the Dolphins football operations. Shortly after the season finale, Parcells fired general manager Randy Mueller and on January 3, 2008, head coach Cam Cameron was fired along with almost all of his staff.

=== 2008–2011: Tony Sparano, Wildcat, and resurgence ===
==== 2008 ====
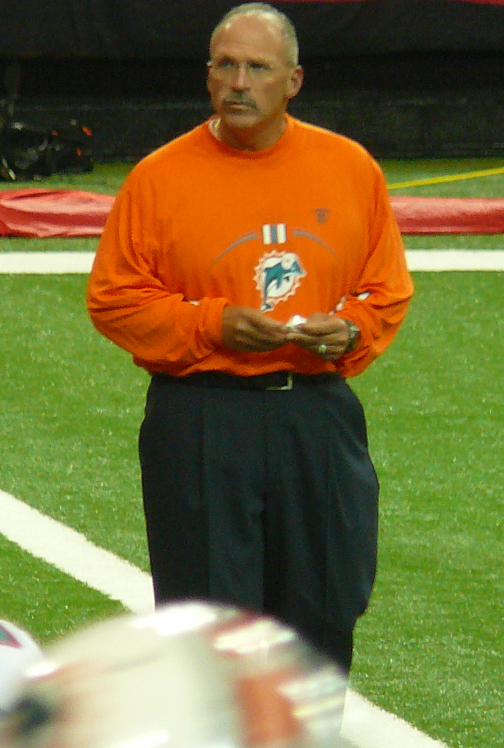
Tony Sparano was head coach from 2008 to 2011

Parcells then hired Tony Sparano, who was previously an assistant under Parcells during his days as the head coach of the Dallas Cowboys. On the 2008 offseason, the Dolphins also parted ways with two long-time Dolphins, releasing linebacker Zach Thomas (who later signed with the Dallas Cowboys) and trading defensive end Jason Taylor to the Washington Redskins for a second-round draft pick. The Dolphins took Jake Long (passing on QB Matt Ryan), star offensive lineman out of the University of Michigan with the first pick of the 2008 draft and drafted quarterback Chad Henne with their second-round pick (the second consecutive year they drafted a QB in the second round). After the New York Jets traded for Brett Favre and released quarterback Chad Pennington the same day, the Dolphins quickly signed Pennington, who was a former Parcells draft pick. The Dolphins performed a 180-degree turnaround, aided by Sparano's offensive adjustments and by the fact that their rival New England (who had long dominated the division) lost Tom Brady to a leg injury on the season opener. After starting the 2008 season with a 0–2 record the Dolphins used the "wildcat" offense against the New England Patriots on six plays, which produced four touchdowns (three rushing and one passing) in a 38–13 upset victory. The wildcat offense or single-wing was a "new" formation that allowed the Dolphins to utilize their two best offensive players, Ronnie Brown and Ricky Williams, who both played running back. From that point on the Dolphins completed the greatest single-season turnaround in NFL history, going from a 1–15 in 2007 to 11–5. Additionally, Miami won the AFC East, becoming the first team in NFL history to win their division after only having one win the previous season. However, the Dolphins lost in the first round of the playoffs to the Baltimore Ravens, 27–9.

==== 2009 ====
In the 2009 off-season, Miami made many additions to the roster, including drafting what would be a very productive corner back tandem of Vontae Davis and Sean Smith. Additionally, they would draft WR Brian Hartline from Ohio State University. Miami would also sign Ricky Williams to a one-year contract extension and sign offensive lineman Richie Incognito.

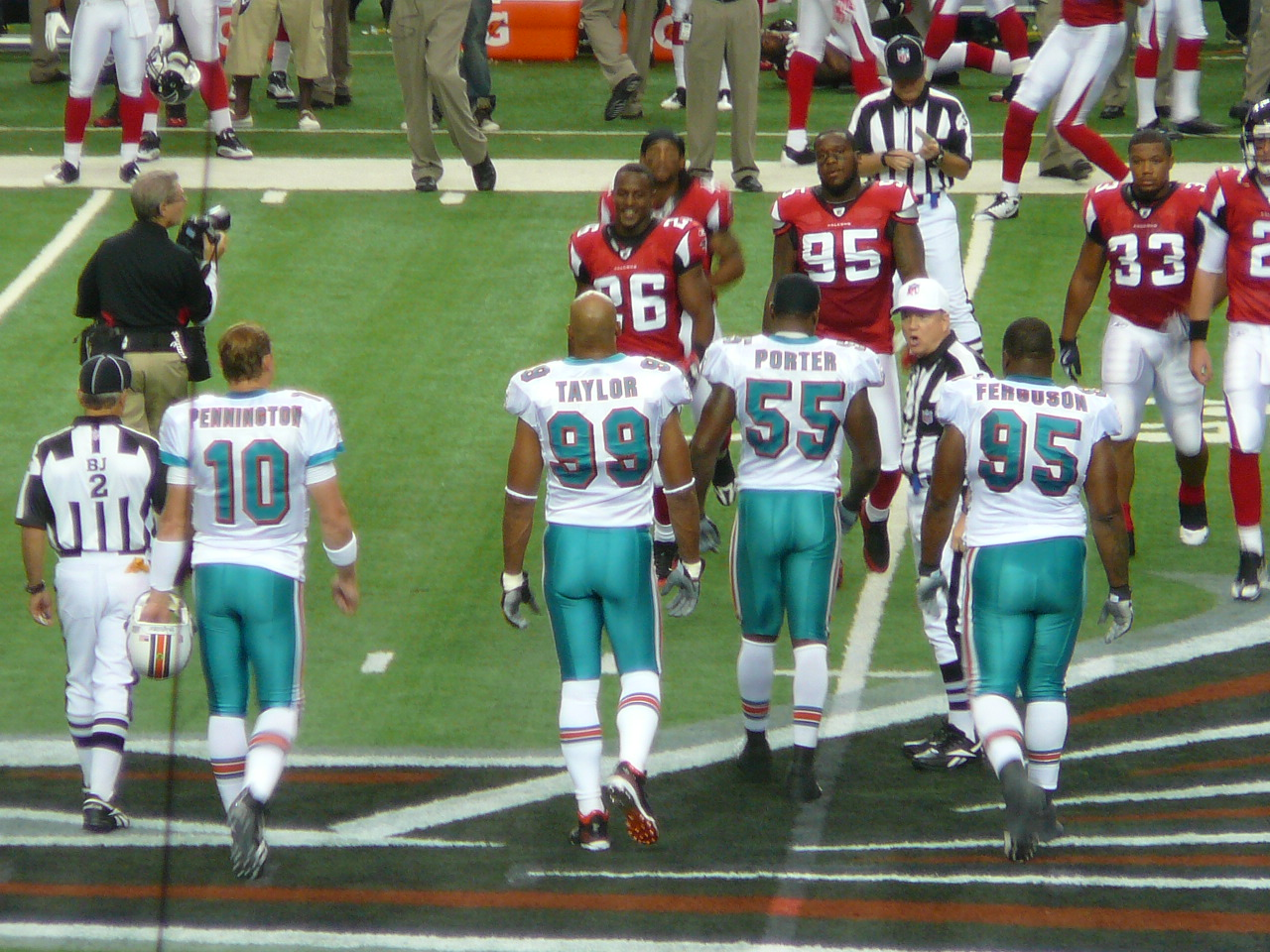
2009 Dolphins team captains Chad Pennington, Jason Taylor (who had returned to the Dolphins after being released by Washington in the offseason), Joey Porter and Jason Ferguson.

In 2009 the Dolphins again started off 0–2. Tom Brady returned to action, and so another Dolphins division title seemed unlikely. In week 3 Chad Pennington suffered a shoulder injury against the San Diego Chargers and was out for the rest of the 2009 season. Second-year quarterback Chad Henne replaced him. Under Henne, the Dolphins won their first two games before losing to the Saints after leading 24–3 towards the end of the first half. The Dolphins finished the rest of the season without Ronnie Brown, who was sidelined by a Lisfranc foot injury that required surgery. Ricky Williams was the starter again and finished the season with 1,121 yards, surpassing his rookie year total at the age of 32. A difficult schedule held the team back, although they managed to beat New England in Week 13. They went into the last game of the season against the Steelers needing only to win to make the playoffs, despite a 7–8 record. However, a 30–24 loss knocked them out of contention. During this game, quarterback Pat White was taken off the field on a stretcher after being hit in the head. Miami ended the season with three consecutive losses to finish 7–9 and out of the playoffs.

==== 2010 ====
During the 2010 NFL Draft, the Dolphins selected Jared Odrick with their first-round draft pick. In September 2010, Bill Parcells, stepped down as Vice President of Football Operations, but remained as a consultant. He was later criticised for not making the right choices to improve the team. Ronnie Brown was back from his leg injury the previous year, and Ricky Williams also returned (while many speculated he would retire). Off-season moves included acquiring WR Brandon Marshall from Denver. The Dolphins got off to a good start by winning their first two matches (both on the road) against Buffalo and Minnesota, but lost at home in Week 3 to the Jets. Week 4 saw another divisional loss at home versus New England before the Dolphins headed on the road again, beating Green Bay 23–20. After a loss at home to Pittsburgh 23–22 on a controversial fumble call the Dolphins hit the road to Cincinnati to win 22–14. Their perfect road streak was finally ended in Week 9 after losing to the Ravens 26–10. The following week, they beat Tennessee for what proved to be their only home win of 2010. Miami went 2–2 down the stretch before being eliminated from playoff contention by Buffalo in Week 15. Two meaningless games against Detroit and New England were lost to end with another middling 7–9 season and a 1–7 home record. At the end of the 2010 season, owner Stephen Ross flew to California to interview Stanford head coach Jim Harbaugh, who was ultimately hired by the San Francisco 49ers to be their new head coach. Word of the trip leaked out to the news media and so Ross apologized to Tony Sparano by giving him a two-year contract extension.

==== 2011 ====
History again repeated itself as the Dolphins failed to improve the offensive side of the ball in the 2011 draft. Veteran QB Chad Pennington meanwhile announced that he would take the year off to recover from injuries. With the team showing little faith in Chad Henne, it was widely assumed they'd take Kyle Orton from Denver and pair him up again with Brandon Marshall, but negotiations failed and Henne was booed in training camp by Dolphins fans who wanted the team to sign Orton. With their first pick in the 2011 NFL draft, and 15th selection overall, the Dolphins selected center Mike Pouncey from Florida, and with their second pick, running back Daniel Thomas. The Dolphins also acquired Reggie Bush from the New Orleans Saints in a trade. Miami then cut Channing Crowder and added Kevin Burnett to replace him. The Dolphins began 0–4 with losses to New England, Houston, Cleveland, and San Diego. By Week 5, Chad Henne had suffered a season-ending injury, forcing Matt Moore, who had recently been acquired from Carolina, into the role of starting quarterback. Week 5 was worse, as the Dolphins, looking lethargic, fell to the Jets 24–6, making them 0–5 to start the season. During a home game against the Denver Broncos, the Dolphins had a 15–0 lead with less than 3 minutes left in the fourth quarter and lost in overtime 18–15 to fall to 0–7. It was in that game Sparano was caught on TV cameras pleading with the referees to review a Broncos touchdown play or else he would get fired. The referees did review the touchdown, but it was upheld. Two days after the game, Sparano put his house up for sale, but he claimed it was because he and his wife wanted to downsize and live closer to the beach. Miami remained winless until Week 9 when they won four out of the next five games, however, it wasn't enough to save Sparano as he was fired the day after the Dolphins lost to the Philadelphia Eagles because of rumors about Sparano's job security becoming a distraction, according to Ross. Todd Bowles was named interim head coach. The Dolphins won the final game of the season against the New York Jets, eliminating them from the playoffs in Jason Taylor's final game. The Dolphins finished the 2011 season with a 6–10 record. In the 2012 offseason, fans organized a protest outside the Dolphins' team facility to call for the firing of General Manager Jeff Ireland. In the 2011 season finale, other fans also raised money to fly an airplane banner over SunLife Stadium that said "Mr. Ross, save our Dolphins, fire Ireland."

== 2012–2021: Joe Philbin, Adam Gase and Brian Flores ==
=== 2012–2015: The Joe Philbin years ===
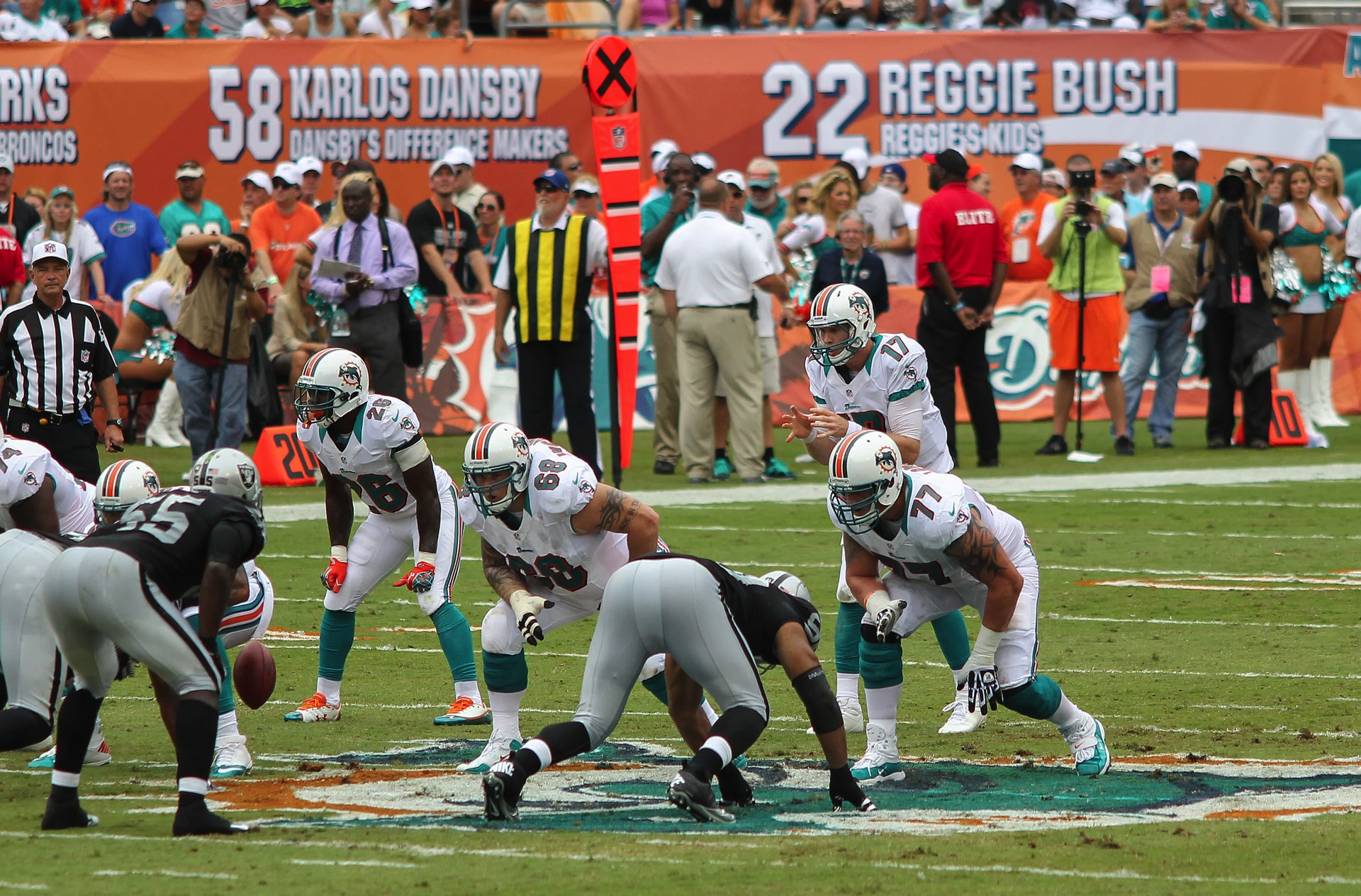
The 2012 Dolphins offense in action

==== 2012 ====
The Dolphins were in contention to hire former long-time Tennessee Titans head coach Jeff Fisher, but he accepted the head coach position with the St. Louis Rams. The Dolphins hired Green Bay Packers assistant Joe Philbin instead as the 10th coach in team history. Philbin had served as the Packers OC for five years, during which time their offense was never ranked below tenth in the NFL, and was also part of their 2010 Super Bowl-winning squad. The Dolphins also pursued quarterbacks Peyton Manning, Matt Flynn and Alex Smith, all of whom chose to sign elsewhere. The Dolphins signed David Garrard and selected Ryan Tannehill with the 8th pick in the 2012 NFL draft. Garrard originally won the starting QB battle against Tannehill and Moore in training camp, but injured his knee in a bizarre accident at home. Rookie Ryan Tannehill won the starting job for the 2012 season after a strong showing in preseason and camp. Garrard was eventually released. In his first game as a professional football player, Tannehill struggled, throwing three interceptions in a loss on the road against the Houston Texans. His first home game was a much different story, as he ran for a touchdown and did not commit any turnovers while dominating the Oakland Raiders. Miami then lost back-to-back OT games against the Jets and the Arizona Cardinals, despite Tannehill throwing for 431 yards, the most ever for a rookie QB in a single game in team history, and receiver Brian Hartline racking up 253 receiving yards, the most ever by a Dolphin receiver, in the game against Arizona. Now facing questions about finishing games, they played Cincinnati on the road and won 17–13 win after Reshad Jones picked off the ball with under a minute and a half left in the game. Despite an impressive 4–3 start, the Dolphins lost a highly touted game against the Colts, 23–20. This started a 3-game losing streak, raising many questions about the team. After staying in Wild Card contention through Week 16, Miami finished 7–9 after being shut out by the Patriots.

==== 2013–2014 ====
With many question marks about the future of some popular players, including Jake Long, the Dolphins went into the off-season looking for help at many positions. They started free agency by re-signing Brian Hartline, and added Mike Wallace, Dannell Ellerbe, Phillip Wheeler, Dustin Keller, and Brandon Gibson, but lost Long and Sean Smith. Despite the signings of Brandon Albert, Cortland Finnegan, Louis Delmas, and Earl Mitchell, and a breakout season for Jelani Jenkins, the Dolphins finished the 2013 season at 8–8 and would have made the playoffs if not for a losing streak near the end of the season. After the 2013 season, general manager Jeff Ireland was fired, as urged by fans for the prior two years, and was replaced by Dennis Hickey. However, despite a 5–3 start, the Dolphins once again finished the 2014 season at 8–8 and missed the playoffs for a sixth consecutive season.

==== 2015 ====
In January 2015, the Dolphins hired former New York Jets general manager Mike Tannenbaum to become the team's executive vice president of football operations. Tannenbaum started his career as a contract negotiator for the Jets and ultimately became their general manager in 2006. He helped build a roster that went to two consecutive AFC Championship games. Newly hired general manager Dennis Hickey would retain his power over the final 53-man roster. However, given Tannenbaum's history, it has been widely speculated that Tannenbaum has final say over personnel. In March 2015, the Dolphins made the biggest free agent signing of the NFL off-season; they signed defensive tackle Ndamukong Suh to the richest contract in NFL history for any defensive player. Suh's contract is for six years and $114 million ($60 million guaranteed). Two months later, in May 2015, the Dolphins locked up franchise quarterback Ryan Tannehill through the 2020 season with a contract extension worth $96 million ($45 million guaranteed). Two months after the Tannehill contract extension was announced, a study done by students at Harvard University used predictive analytics to try to determine the success of each NFL team for the upcoming season. The study predicted the Dolphins to win Super Bowl 50. However, the Dolphins began the 2015 season with a 1–3 record, which resulted in head coach Joe Philbin's firing on October 5, 2015, one day after the Dolphins lost to the Jets in London's Wembley Stadium. Tight end coach Dan Campbell, a holdover from the Sparano regime, was appointed as interim head coach. The Dolphins would finish the season with a record of 6-10.

=== 2016–2018: Adam Gase era and Chris Grier hiring ===
==== 2016 ====
On January 9, 2016, Bears offensive coordinator Adam Gase was hired as head coach. Five days earlier, the Dolphins promoted long-time scout Chris Grier as their new general manager. In the first round of the 2016 NFL Draft, the Dolphins selected Ole Miss tackle Laremy Tunsil, a projected first selection overall who felt down in the draft due to a controversial video published on a social media account. The Dolphins also swung a trade with the Philadelphia Eagles, sending the 8th overall pick for linebacker Kiko Alonso and cornerback Byron Maxwell and the 13th overall pick. The Adam Gase era got off to a lackluster start, as the Dolphins were 1–4 with their only win coming in overtime against a struggling Cleveland Browns team. However, the Dolphins upset the first place Pittsburgh Steelers, 30–15 in week 6, sparking a 6-game winning streak and launching the team into playoff contention at 7–4. After a blowout loss to the Baltimore Ravens, the Dolphins won 3 straight games against the Arizona Cardinals, New York Jets and Buffalo Bills to clinch their first playoff spot since 2008. The Dolphins finished 10–6 and locked up the number 6 seed in the playoffs. They were defeated in the first round by the Pittsburgh Steelers in a rematch of the week 6 contest.

==== 2017 ====
During training camp, Ryan Tannehill aggravated a knee injury that ended his 2016 season, ending his 2017 season before it started when he opted for surgery. As a result, the Dolphins signed former Chicago Bears quarterback Jay Cutler out of retirement to replace Tannehill. The Dolphins fell short of repeating their 2016 success, finishing with a 6–10 record and trading away star running back Jay Ajayi to the Philadelphia Eagles. However, some highlights of the season included notable upsets over the Atlanta Falcons and New England Patriots, who played in the Super Bowl the year prior.

==== 2018 ====
During the offseason, Miami released Suh and traded away receiver Jarvis Landry after signing him to a franchise tag. To replace the productivity of Landry in Miami's offense, the Dolphins signed former New England Patriots wide receiver Danny Amendola and Kansas City Chiefs wide receiver Albert Wilson. They also signed veteran running back Frank Gore and offensive guard Josh Sitton, ranked fifth at his position by Pro Football Focus, to help bolster up their offensive line.

The 2018 season started well for the Dolphins, as they attained their first 3–0 start since the Marino era and saw Ryan Tannehill return from his knee injury. However, Tannehill injured his shoulder during a Week 5 game against the Cincinnati Bengals, forcing him to miss five games. During a Week 14 home game against the Patriots, the Dolphins executed what became known as the Miracle in Miami. Tannehill completed a pass to wide receiver Kenny Stills, who lateraled to fellow receiver DeVante Parker. Parker then lateraled the ball to running back Kenyan Drake, who rushed to the end zone as time expired, giving the Dolphins a 34–33 win. The win helped the Dolphins improve to 7–6 on the season, but they dropped their final three games to finish 7–9 and missed the playoffs for the second straight season. Gase was fired on December 31, 2018, a day after the Dolphins' Week 17 loss to the Bills.

=== 2019 ===
Long-time Patriots assistant Brian Flores (who had been with the team since their 2004 Super Bowl-winning season) was announced as the next Dolphins head coach to replace the fired Adam Gase, officially being named to the position on February 4, 2019, a day after the Patriots won Super Bowl LIII. During the offseason, Ryan Tannehill was traded to the Tennessee Titans and numerous other players such as Cameron Wake, Danny Amendola, Andre Branch and Josh Sitton were released or allowed to become free agents. The Dolphins then signed journeyman quarterback Ryan Fitzpatrick and traded for Arizona Cardinals quarterback Josh Rosen to compete for the quarterback position. On August 31, 2019, the Dolphins traded Laremy Tunsil and Kenny Stills to the Houston Texans in exchange for two first-round picks and a second-round pick. Two days later, the Dolphins then released long-time snapper John Denney, who had been with the team since 2005 and was the longest-tenured player on the roster prior to his release. Over the next few weeks, the Dolphins continued to trade other starters such as Kiko Alonso, Minkah Fitzpatrick, and Kenyan Drake for draft picks and were criticized for allegedly "tanking" for a better draft position early in the season, most notably for Alabama quarterback Tua Tagovailoa, who at the time, was considered possibly the first pick in the 2020 NFL draft, before suffering a season-ending hip injury on November 16, 2019. Ryan Fitzpatrick and Rosen alternated games at quarterback to little success, but the job was ultimately clinched by Fitzpatrick after a string of strong performances starting in week 5. After starting the season 0–7 while losing each of the first four games by a total of 163 points and scoring a total of just 26 points and 2 touchdowns, the Dolphins won the next two games, including one over the New York Jets, which were led by the ex-Dolphins coach Adam Gase. The Dolphins finished their first season under Flores with a 5–11 record, including another upset win over the Patriots in Week 17, which denied the Patriots a first-round bye, and was both their first road win over the Patriots since 2008 and their first road win over the Tom Brady-led Patriots since 2005.

=== 2020 ===
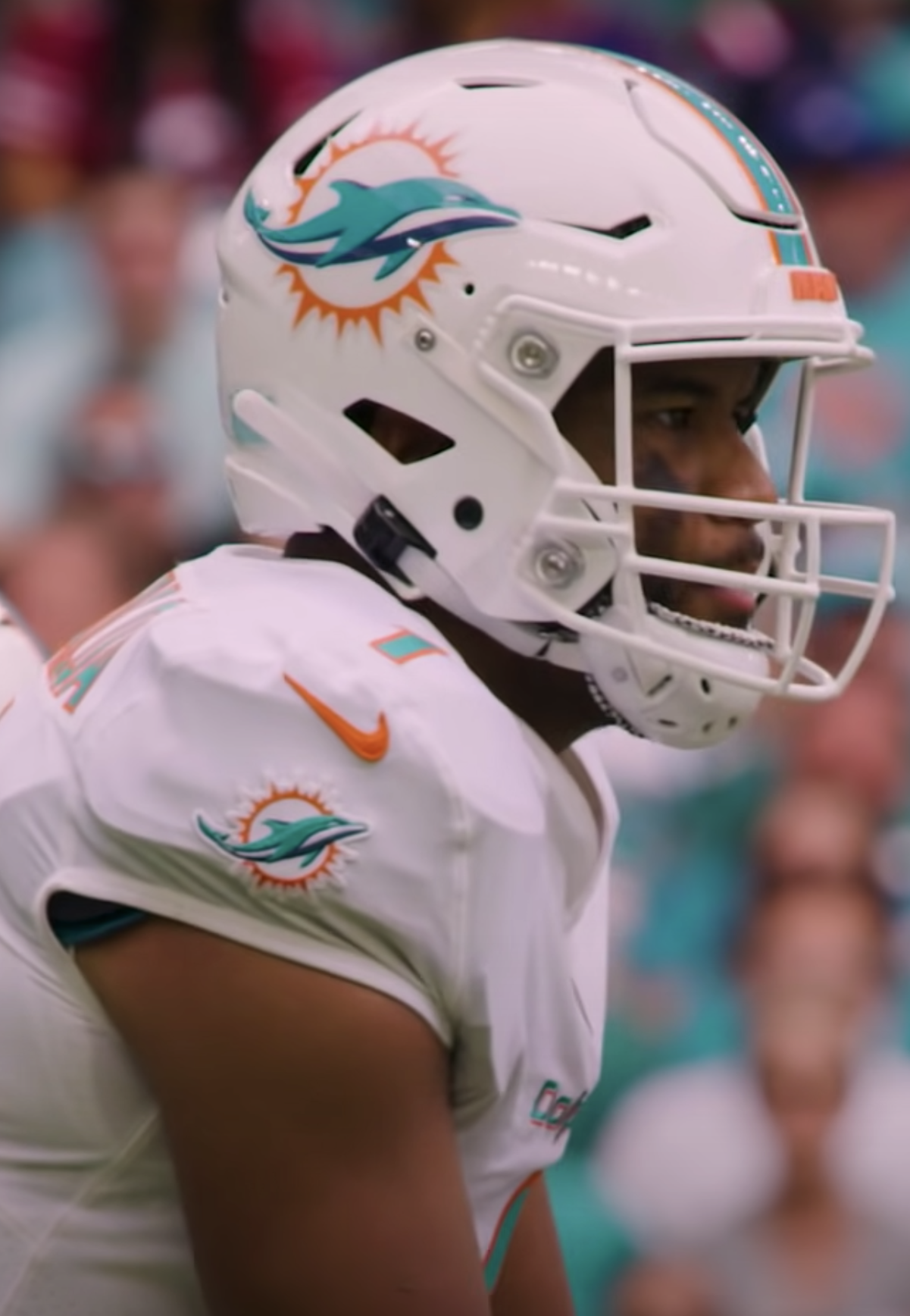
The Dolphins selected Alabama quarterback Tua Tagovailoa 5th overall in 2020.

Thanks to the trades prior to and during the 2019 season, the Dolphins held three first-round picks in the 2020 NFL draft (picks 5, 18, and 26). Miami drafted Alabama quarterback Tua Tagovailoa, tackle Austin Jackson, and cornerback Noah Igbinoghene, releasing Josh Rosen following training camp. Ryan Fitzpatrick continued to start at quarterback at the start of the season, but the starting role was eventually handed to Tagovailoa during Week 8, after the Dolphins began the season 0-2, 1-3, and then 3-3. Tagovailoa showed promise in his 8 starts as a Dolphin, going 6-3 at the helm, and had helped establish the Dolphins as playoff contenders, starting 6-3 for the first time since 2001 and 8-4 for the first time since 2003. 4th-year cornerback Xavien Howard became the first player since Antonio Cromartie in 2007 to record at least 10 interceptions in a season. Despite finishing the season with a 10-6 record, the Dolphins missed the playoffs after a 56-26 blowout loss to the Buffalo Bills in Week 17, and after the Indianapolis Colts defeated the Jacksonville Jaguars 28-14 that same day.

=== 2021 ===
Despite high expectations in 2021, Miami sputtered to a 1–7 start, losing seven in a row after beating the New England Patriots in week 1, with Tagovailoa struggling with inconsistent play and injuries at first. However, they would then proceed to win the next seven games to remain in the playoff hunt, also becoming the first team in NFL history to have a 7-game winning streak as well as a 7-game losing streak in the same season. The seven game winning streak was their first since the 1985 season. Despite being eliminated from playoff contention by losing to the Tennessee Titans, led by former Dolphins quarterback Ryan Tannehill in Week 17, the Dolphins finished the season 9–8, making Flores the first coach to lead the team to consecutive winning seasons since Dave Wannstedt did so in 2002 and 2003. Nonetheless, owner Stephen M. Ross fired Flores on January 10, 2022 in a surprise move, allegedly due to poor relationships with both the roster, particularly with Tagovailoa, and the front office.

== 2022–2025: The Tyreek Hill era ==
=== 2022 ===
On August 2, 2022, it was announced that following a six-month independent investigation by Mary Jo White and a team of lawyers, the NFL would strip the Dolphins of their 2023 first-round draft pick and a 2024 third-round draft pick for violating the league's anti-tampering policy on three occasions from 2019 to 2022 by engaging in impermissible conversations with quarterback Tom Brady and then-New Orleans Saints coach Sean Payton, both of whom were under contract with other teams. Team owner Stephen M. Ross was also fined $1.5 million and suspended through October 17, and was prohibited from being at the Dolphins' facility or representing the team at any event until then. He was also prohibited from attending any league meeting before the annual meeting in 2023, and was removed from all league committees indefinitely. Vice chairman/limited partner Bruce Beal was fined $500,000 and will not be permitted to attend any league meetings for the rest of the 2022 season.

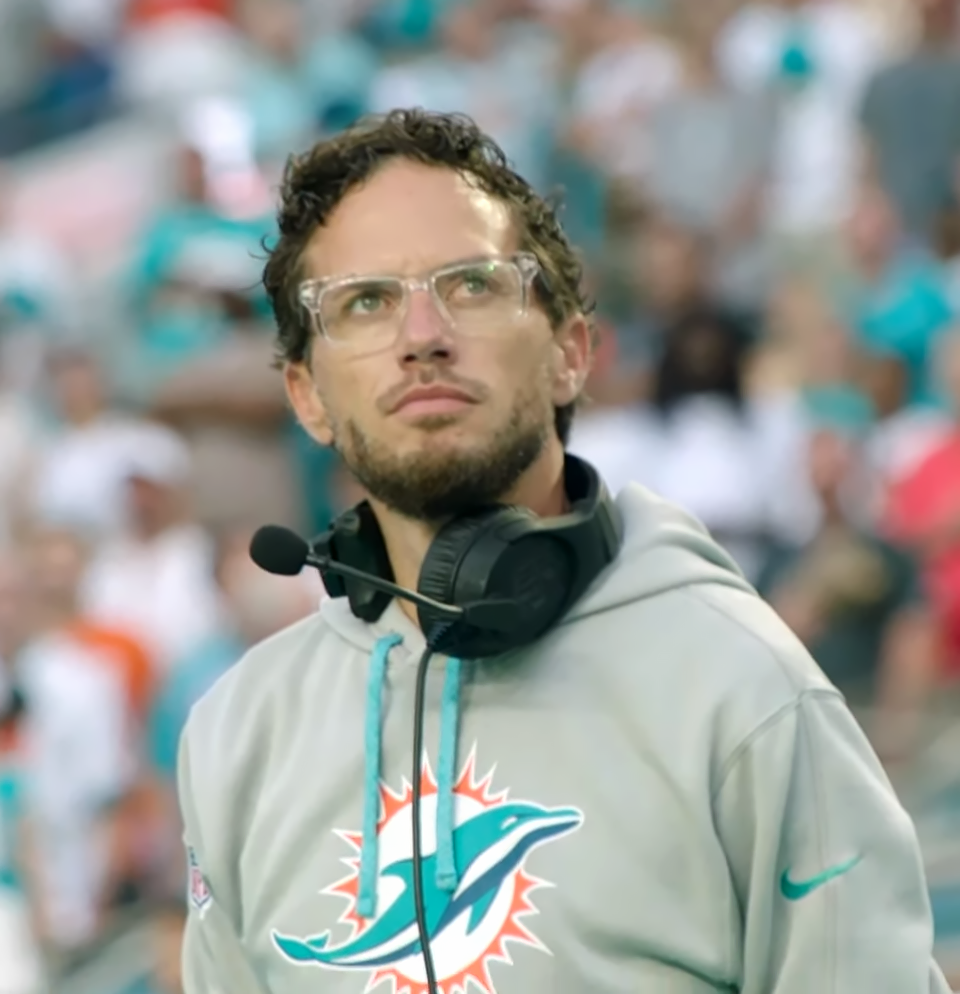
Mike McDaniel, head coach of the Dolphins from 2022 to 2025, who revitalized Miami's offense in his early years.

The Dolphins hired former San Francisco 49ers offensive assistant Mike McDaniel as their new head coach and made a splash move in trading for former Kansas City Chiefs receiver Tyreek Hill. With these new additions, the Dolphins offense became one of the most explosive in the league and Tagovailoa's performance greatly improved in light of a better relationship with McDaniel than with Flores, though the Dolphins received criticism for handling several concussions sustained by Tagovailoa throughout the course of the season and their defense regressed. Miami matched its record from the previous year at 9–8, good enough to clinch the 7th seed in the 2022 playoffs, where they would lose to Buffalo in the wild card round.

=== 2023 ===
In 2023, the Dolphins improved to a 11–6 mark as Tagovailoa stayed healthy throughout all 17 games, even taking the division lead over Buffalo for the majority of the season. However, the Bills clinched the division by winning an "AFC East championship game" in week 18 that was flexed to NBC Sunday Night Football, as Miami was relegated to the sixth seed in the playoffs with their loss. The season again ended in the Wild Card Round, with a 26–7 loss to the Kansas City Chiefs.

=== 2024 ===
In 2024, the Dolphins struggled throughout the season as they failed to improve on their 11-6 record from the previous season. They did have a chance to clinch a playoff berth with a win over the New York Jets and losses by the Broncos and the Bengals. However, they lost to the Jets and not only did they miss the playoffs for the first time since 2021, but earned their first losing season since 2019 to finish at 8-9.

=== 2025 ===
Despite starting the season with a 1–6 record, and despite struggles by Tagovailoa and losing Tyreek Hill to injury, the Dolphins had a midseason turnaround, winning five of their next six to keep their playoff hopes alive late season. However, after a loss in Week 15 to the Pittsburgh Steelers, Miami was officially eliminated from postseason contention for the second year in a row. This also extended their playoff win drought to 25 seasons. On October 31, the Dolphins and general manager Chris Grier parted ways. Mike McDaniel was fired as head coach after the season on January 8, 2026.

== 2026–present: Jon-Eric Sullivan and Jeff Hafley ==
=== 2026 ===
On January 9, 2026, the Dolphins hired the Green Bay Packers' vice president of player personnel, Jon-Eric Sullivan, as their general manager. On January 19, 2026, the Dolphins hired Packers defensive coordinator Jeff Hafley as their new head coach.
