= Charles Bowser =

American football player (born 1959)

- Bowser (56) playing for the Miami Dolphins in 1985

No. 56
- Position: Linebacker

Personal information
- Born: September 2, 1959 (age 67); Plymouth, North Carolina, U.S.
- Listed height: 6 ft 3 in (1.91 m)
- Listed weight: 231 lb (105 kg)

Career information
- High school: Plymouth
- College: Duke
- NFL draft: 1982: 4th round, 108th overall pick

Career history
- Miami Dolphins (1982–1985); Cleveland Browns (1987)*
- * Offseason or practice squad member only

Awards and highlights
- First-team All-ACC (1981)

Career NFL statistics
- Sacks: 20
- Fumble recoveries: 1
- Stats at Pro Football Reference

Charles Bowser (born October 2, 1959) is an American former professional football player who was a linebacker for four seasons with the Miami Dolphins of the National Football League (NFL). He played college football for the Duke Blue Devils.

== Early life and career ==
Bowser played his college career at Duke University, setting the school's single season and career sacks record at 17.5 and 22, respectively. Bowser graduated from Plymouth High School, located in Plymouth, North Carolina in 1978. Charles Bowser also played a role as part of the Miami Dolphins Killer Bees Defense of the 1980s. Other members included Lyle Blackwood, Glenn Blackwood, Bob Baumhower, Bob Brudzinski, Kim Bokamper, Bill Barnett, Doug Betters, and honorary member A. J. Duhe. He was selected in the fourth round of the 1982 NFL draft with the 108th overall pick by the Miami Dolphins.
