= Super Bowl XIX =

1985 edition of the Super Bowl

Miami Dolphins (1) (AFC) (14–2)	San Francisco 49ers (1) (NFC) (15–1)
16	38
Head coach: Don Shula	Head coach: Bill Walsh
	1	2	3	4	Total
MIA	10	6	0	0	16
SF	7	21	10	0	38
- Date: January 20, 1985
- Kickoff time: 03:20p.m. PST (UTC-8)
- Stadium: Stanford Stadium; Stanford, California
- MVP: Joe Montana, quarterback
- Favorite: 49ers by 3.5
- Referee: Pat Haggerty
- Attendance: 84,059

Ceremonies
- National anthem: San Francisco Boys Chorus, San Francisco Girls Chorus, Piedmont Children's Chorus and San Francisco Children's Chorus
- Coin toss: Ronald Reagan (via satellite from the White House) and Hugh McElhenny
- Halftime show: "World of Children's Dreams" with the United States Air Force Tops In Blue

TV in the United States
- Network: ABC
- Announcers: Frank Gifford, Don Meredith and Joe Theismann
- Nielsen ratings: 46.4 (est. 85.53 million viewers)
- Market share: 63
- Cost of 30-second commercial: $525,000

Radio in the United States
- Network: CBS Radio
- Announcers: Jack Buck and Hank Stram

Super Bowl XIX was an American football game between the American Football Conference (AFC) champion Miami Dolphins and the National Football Conference (NFC) champion San Francisco 49ers to decide the National Football League (NFL) champion for the 1984 season. The 49ers defeated the Dolphins by the score of 38–16, to win their second Super Bowl. The game was played on January 20, 1985, at Stanford Stadium, on the campus of Stanford University in Stanford, California, the first Super Bowl played in the San Francisco Bay Area. This also became the second Super Bowl after Super Bowl XIV where the game was coincidentally played in the home market of one of the participants.

The game was hyped as the battle between two great quarterbacks: Miami's Dan Marino and San Francisco's Joe Montana. The Dolphins entered their fifth Super Bowl in team history after posting a 14–2 regular season record. The 49ers were making their second Super Bowl appearance after becoming the first team to win 15 regular season games since the league expanded to a 16-game schedule in 1978.

With Marino and Montana, the game became the first Super Bowl in which the starting quarterbacks of each team both threw for over 300 yards. In addition, the two teams combined for 851 total offensive yards, which at that time was a Super Bowl record. But after trailing 10–7 in the first quarter, the 49ers would end up taking the game in dominating fashion, scoring three touchdowns in the second quarter, and 10 unanswered points in the second half. Montana, who was named the Super Bowl MVP, completed 24 of 35 passes for a Super Bowl-record 331 yards (breaking the mark of 318 yards set by Terry Bradshaw) and three touchdowns. He also broke the Super Bowl record for most rushing yards gained by a quarterback with his five rushes for 59 yards and one rushing touchdown. San Francisco set a Super Bowl record with 537 total yards, breaking the previous record of 429 yards set by the Oakland Raiders in Super Bowl XI.

This was the first Super Bowl to be televised in the United States by ABC, joining the annual broadcasting rotation of the game with CBS and NBC. It was also the first time that the sitting U.S. president participated in the coin toss ceremony; Ronald Reagan appeared live via satellite from the White House and tossed the coin. This Super Bowl was unique in that it fell on the same day that he was inaugurated for a second term; because Inauguration Day (January 20) fell on a Sunday, Reagan was sworn in privately and the public ceremony took place the following day. This was the only Super Bowl to have been played on inauguration day.

This Super Bowl also began the NFC's run of dominance. From 1984 to 1996, the National Football Conference won 13 consecutive Super Bowls and the average score per game in that span was nearly identical to the result of this game, NFC 38, AFC 17. The NFC scored 490 points and committed only 10 turnovers altogether during their run, while the AFC only scored 219 points and committed 44 turnovers.

== Background ==
=== Host selection process ===
NFL owners voted to award Super Bowl XIX to Stanford Stadium on the campus of Stanford University in Stanford, California on December 14, 1982, at the owners' mid-season meeting held in Dallas. Near Palo Alto, it was the first Super Bowl to be held in the San Francisco Bay Area. It became the fourth primarily collegiate stadium to host a Super Bowl, following Tulane Stadium, then the home of the Saints (IV, VI, and IX), Rice Stadium (VIII) and the Rose Bowl (XI, XIV, and XVII; it later hosted XXI and XXVII). Owners had tentatively planned to award XIX during the owners' meetings in Detroit on June 3, 1981. Tampa (Tampa Stadium), Miami (Orange Bowl), New Orleans (Superdome), Pasadena (Rose Bowl), Detroit (Silverdome), and Dallas (Cotton Bowl) each made presentations that day, with Detroit and Dallas expressedly bidding on only XIX. Tampa was selected for XVIII, but with no outstanding options, owners decided to postpone the awarding of XIX until their 1982 meeting.

The league eventually reopened the bidding process from scratch. Hosts for both XIX and XX would be selected, and potentially XXI as well. A total of ten cities put in bids: Palo Alto (Stanford Stadium), New Orleans (Superdome), Miami (Orange Bowl), Houston (Rice Stadium), Seattle (Kingdome), Detroit (Silverdome), Pasadena (Rose Bowl), Tampa (Tampa Stadium), Anaheim (Anaheim Stadium), and Jacksonville (Gator Bowl). Stanford Stadium was picked, despite having no lights at the time, no dressing rooms, and a substandard press box. Stadium officials promised much needed renovations, and the league agreed to provide temporary lighting. Representatives from New Orleans stressed that if they were not selected for XX, due to scheduling conflicts, they would not be able to host again until 1990. As such, the Superdome was subsequently selected for XX. Rice Stadium was speculated for XXI, but ultimately no decision was made for that game. Yet again, Miami was rejected, due to the aging condition of the Orange Bowl. A proposed sales tax levy to pay for a new stadium had failed at the ballot box on November 2, further sinking any chances for South Florida.

=== Miami Dolphins ===
The Dolphins advanced to the Super Bowl for the fifth time in franchise history, but the year began in tragedy as running back David Overstreet was killed in an automobile accident on June 24 (the team would wear decals on the back of their helmets with the number 20, Overstreet's jersey number). The Dolphins joined the Dallas Cowboys as the only teams to appear in five Super Bowls. Much of the media focus was on Miami's young quarterback, Dan Marino. In just his second year in the league, he broke nearly every NFL single-season passing record. Marino set a record for the most completions in a season (362) and became the first quarterback to throw for over 5,000 yards, reaching a total of 5,084. He set the record for the most games throwing for at least 300 passing yards (9) and the most games with 400 yards (4). Marino's 48 touchdown passes broke the previous record of 36, which was held by both George Blanda for the Houston Oilers in 1961 and Y. A. Tittle for the New York Giants in 1963. And he had the most games (6) and the most consecutive games (4) with at least 4 touchdown passes.

Thus going into Super Bowl XIX, many sports writers predicted that it would be the first of many Super Bowls that Marino would play in during his career. Marino had a unique ability to read the defenses quickly before setting up to throw, and his skill of quickly releasing the ball made it very difficult for defenders to sack him. In addition, he had protection given to him by an offensive line led by their All-Pro, and future Hall of Fame center Dwight Stephenson and Pro Bowl guard Ed Newman. Coming into Super Bowl XIX, Marino had only been sacked 13 times in the regular season and not once in the playoffs.

The Dolphins had a number of offensive threats for Marino to use. Wide receivers Mark Clayton (73 receptions, 1,389 yards, 18 touchdowns) and Mark Duper (71 receptions, 1,306 yards, 8 touchdowns) became the first teammates to each gain over 1,300 receiving yards in one season, while Clayton's 18 touchdown catches broke the NFL single-season record of 17 set by Don Hutson in 1942. Receiver Nat Moore caught 43 passes for 574 yards and 6 touchdowns, while tight end Dan Johnson contributed 34 receptions for 426 yards. While Miami's main offensive attack was passing, they still had a trio of great running backs: Tony Nathan, Woody Bennett, and Joe Carter. Both Nathan and Bennett finished the season with over 1,000 combined rushing and receiving yards, while Carter contributed 495 rushing yards. Despite Miami's superb offense, punter Reggie Roby still made the Pro Bowl, averaging 44.7 yards per punt with a net gain average of 38.7.

However, the Dolphins' defense was a little suspect. They tied the Houston Oilers and the Minnesota Vikings for the most rushing yards allowed during the regular season (4.7 yards per attempt), and ranked just 19th in fewest yards allowed (5,759). The decline coincided with the loss of defensive coordinator Bill Arnsparger, who departed following the 1983 season to become head coach at Louisiana State University. Arnsparger was on the Dolphin staff for each of their four previous Super Bowl appearances.

The main bright spots on the defense were safeties, brothers Lyle and Glenn Blackwood, along with Pro Bowl inside linebacker A. J. Duhe, Pro Bowl nose tackle Bob Baumhower, and defensive end Doug Betters. Glenn Blackwood had picked off 6 passes during the season and returned them for 169 yards, while Betters recorded 14 sacks and a fumble recovery. Linebacker Charles Bowser was also a big contributor, recording 9 sacks and one fumble recovery.

Despite their defensive flaws, the Dolphins finished 7th in the NFL in points allowed (298 points). Their powerful offense led the NFL in scoring (513 points) and total yards gained (7,064), and helped the team reach an AFC best 14–2 regular season record.

=== San Francisco 49ers ===
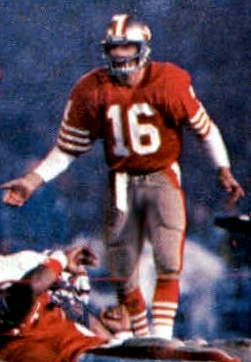
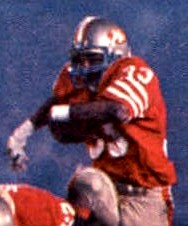
Joe Montana (left) and Roger Craig (right) were major contributions to the 49ers offense in passing and rushing, respectively.

The 49ers advanced to their second Super Bowl in team history after becoming the first team to win 15 regular season games since the league expanded to a 16-game schedule in 1978. Much of the hype surrounding the team was their offense, which boasted five Pro Bowlers. Quarterback Joe Montana recorded 279 completions out of 432 attempts for 3,630 yards, 28 touchdowns, and only 10 interceptions. Fullback Roger Craig was one of the 49ers' major weapons, both rushing and receiving. Craig was the team's second-leading rusher with 649 rushing yards and 7 touchdowns, and also caught 71 passes for 675 yards. Pro Bowl halfback Wendell Tyler, who had rushed for a team record 1,262 yards during the regular season, recorded 7 rushing touchdowns, and also caught 28 passes for 230 yards and 2 touchdown receptions. Tight end (and former fullback) Earl Cooper also made an impact with 41 receptions for 459 yards and 4 touchdowns. Fellow tight end Russ Francis was another reliable target, catching 23 passes for 285 yards and two touchdowns. Wide receivers Freddie Solomon and Dwight Clark also were deep threats, gaining a combined total of 1,617 yards and 16 touchdowns. Up front, three of the 49ers' five starting offensive linemen, Randy Cross, Fred Quillan, and Keith Fahnhorst, had been selected to play in the Pro Bowl. Overall, San Francisco's offense finished the season ranked second in the NFL in scoring (475 points) and fourth in total yards (6,544).

Although they did not get as much media attention as the offense, the 49ers' defense led the league in fewest points allowed during the regular season (227). All four of the 49ers' starting defensive backs, Ronnie Lott, Eric Wright, Carlton Williamson, and Dwight Hicks, were selected to play in the Pro Bowl. Pro Bowl linebacker Keena Turner was also a major defensive weapon, recording 2 sacks and 4 interceptions for 51 yards. Defensive end Dwaine Board anchored the line, recording 10 sacks and a fumble recovery. Future hall of fame Defensive end Fred Dean missed the first 11 games of the season holding out over a contract dispute, but immediately made his presence felt upon returning, recording 4 sacks in his five games.

=== Playoffs ===
The Dolphins gained 405 yards of total offense in their 31–10 playoff win over the Seattle Seahawks, and over 500 yards as they defeated the Pittsburgh Steelers, 45–28, in the AFC Championship Game. In the victory over the Steelers (the only team to beat San Francisco during the season), Marino completed 21 of 32 passes for 421 yards and 4 touchdowns, with 1 interception.

Meanwhile, the 49ers' underrated defense allowed the team to blitz through the playoffs. Although Montana threw a combined total of 5 interceptions in their 2 games, they only gave up a combined total of 10 points and no offensive touchdowns in their victories over the New York Giants, 21–10, and the Chicago Bears, 23–0.

At 33–3, the combined records for the two teams coming into the game were and still are the best in Super Bowl history. The 49ers were 17–1 and the Dolphins 16–2 including their playoff games.

== Pregame news and notes ==
This was the second time a team could have been considered a home team for a Super Bowl, with Stanford just 30 miles (48 km) away from San Francisco proper - Stanford is actually 15 miles (24 km) closer to the city than Santa Clara, where the 49ers play home games today. The 49ers' practice facility was located in Redwood City at the time, just 5 miles (8.0 km) from Stanford Stadium. Promotion for the Super Bowl also contributed to that feeling with many photographs of the Vince Lombardi Trophy near San Francisco landmarks such as the Golden Gate Bridge. Thus, the 49ers were considered the only team to have won the Super Bowl at home until the Tampa Bay Buccaneers achieved the same feat in Super Bowl LV in 2021. The Los Angeles Rams also played near home at the Rose Bowl in Pasadena, California in Super Bowl XIV, but lost to the Pittsburgh Steelers. In February 2022 the Rams beat the Cincinnati Bengals in Super Bowl LVI at SoFi Stadium in Inglewood, their home since 2020.

The 49ers, as the designated home team in the annual rotation between AFC and NFC teams, wore their home red uniforms and gold pants. The Dolphins wore their all-white road uniforms.

This would be the final Super Bowl where a regular position player wore the classic duck bill 2 bar face mask (Dolphins wide receiver Mark Duper).

== Broadcasting ==
=== United States ===
As a result of the 1982 television contract signed by the NFL, this game was the first Super Bowl to be televised in the United States by ABC, with a new alternation process started for the 1983 game. Previously, the Super Bowl telecast alternated between CBS and NBC, while the networks simulcast the first AFL-NFL World Championship Game. The 1984 season was ABC's 15th year of airing Monday Night Football, but ABC was never awarded the rights to any Super Bowl before.

Frank Gifford was the play-by-play announcer, with analyst Don Meredith and then-Washington Redskins quarterback Joe Theismann served as color commentators. Al Michaels and Jim Lampley co-hosted the pregame (2 hours), halftime, and postgame coverage. Lampley also presided over the Vince Lombardi Trophy presentation ceremony coverage for ABC. Michaels and Lampley were joined by O. J. Simpson, the normal Monday Night Football co-color commentator and Dallas Cowboys head coach Tom Landry, the latter serving as a special guest analyst. When interviewed as to why Theismann joined Gifford and Meredith in the booth instead of Simpson, Monday Night Football director Chet Forte was quoted in the January 14, 1985 edition of Broadcasting Magazine as saying that Theismann could contribute more due to having played both teams in the regular-season as well as having played in the two previous Super Bowls. Also helping out with ABC's coverage were Jack Whitaker, Dick Schaap, Donna de Varona, Ray Gandolf, and ABC News correspondents Stone Phillips, Jeff Greenfield, Judd Rose, and Bill Redeker.

This would be the only ABC Super Bowl for Gifford as play-by-play announcer, the final game for Don Meredith and the second (and last) time a commentator for the Super Bowl (Theismann) was an active player (Jack Kemp (then of the American Football League Buffalo Bills) in Super Bowl II was the only other active player to provide commentary). Michaels would call ABC's next six Super Bowls, until ABC lost their NFL rights in 2006.

This Super Bowl also marked the first to have closed captioning in real time throughout the game courtesy of the National Captioning Institute (previous Super Bowls only had "scoreboard information" captioned); with the captioning sponsored by Ford Motor Company and Kentucky Fried Chicken.

On radio, Jack Buck was the play-by-play announcer, while Hank Stram served as color commentator for CBS Radio Sports' national coverage. Brent Musburger hosted the pregame, halftime, and postgame coverage for CBS Radio; Musburger was joined by analysts Irv Cross and Jimmy "The Greek" Snyder. Locally, Super Bowl XIX was broadcast by WIOD in Miami with Rick Weaver and Hank Goldberg; and by KCBS in San Francisco with Don Klein and Don Heinrich.

ABC's lead-out program was the series premiere of MacGruder and Loud.

=== International ===
Shown on Channel 4, Super Bowl XIX was the third to be broadcast live and in its entirety in the United Kingdom.

Super Bowl XIX was simulcast in Canada on CTV.

In Australia, Super Bowl XIX was broadcast on the Nine Network, live from 10.00am (Australian Eastern Summer Time) on Monday, January 21, 1985, with a repeat screening late at night. This was the first Super Bowl to be telecast in Australia.

=== In popular culture ===
Clips from this game can be seen in the movie Ace Ventura: Pet Detective as the character Ray Finkle is in reality Dolphins kicker Uwe von Schamann. Von Schamann made three field goals and an extra point in this game, but Finkle missed the game-winning field goal in a fictional Super Bowl XIX. The latter play actually occurred six years later in Super Bowl XXV.

The NFL's Greatest Games episode Masters of the Game focuses on Super Bowl XIX. The film was narrated by Brad Crandall after legendary NFL Films announcer John Facenda died in September 1984. This was the last Super Bowl highlight film produced by NFL Films using film stock; beginning with the 1985 season, NFL Films videos were produced on videotape.

The Oliver Stone film, Any Given Sunday, features an (off-screen) "Pantheon Cup" championship game where San Francisco beats Miami, 32–13. Stone, a longtime 49ers fan, based his film's finale on Super Bowl XIX.

A major plot point in the episode "Post Traumatic Slide Syndrome" of the television show Sliders is based on this game. In the alternate reality, the 49ers play the Jets in the Super Bowl, which leads the main character Quinn Mallory to the conclusion that something is awry.

== Entertainment ==
=== Pre-game ===
The pre-game festivities featured a tribute to the NFL and an appearance by various team mascots. Later, a mega-choir formed by members of the San Francisco Children's Chorus, San Francisco Boys Chorus, San Francisco Girls Chorus and Piedmont Children's Choir performed the national anthem under well known choir director Louis Magor.

In honor of Inauguration Day, Ronald Reagan, himself a longtime California resident and former Governor of the state from 1967 to 1975, became the first president to participate in a Super Bowl coin toss ceremony. However, he did it from the White House via satellite. Pro Football Hall of Fame running back Hugh McElhenny, a former 49er, was on the field during the ceremony. This was the first Super Bowl where the coin was tossed after the visiting team had chosen heads or tails, not during. This would not become a regular practice until Super Bowl XXXIII in 1999.

The U.S. Air Force provided four T-37 Tweet trainers from nearby Mather Air Force Base (Sacramento, CA) and its 455th Flying Training Squadron for the fly-over. At $255 per hour of flying time for each aircraft, this T-37 flyover ranks as the most economical in the history of Super Bowls. In addition, all the pilots were young officers symbolizing California as the land of opportunity and youth.

=== Halftime ===
The halftime show was titled "World of Children's Dreams" and featured Tops In Blue, an elite performing tour ensemble consisting of members from the U.S. Air Force. Additional performers were recruited from USAF active, retired, and their dependents from mostly in and around Mather Air Force Base, Sacramento, CA. The show was produced and directed by Mr. Tom Edward, Director of Air Force Entertainment, Randolph Air Force Base, Texas. The stages were constructed by an all volunteer group of members from Mather Air Force that were designed by 1st. Lt. Larry Ruebling, who was a missile combat crew member stationed at Malmstom Air Force Base, Montana. The main stages consisted of a pirate ship, a gigantic piano, a circus stage, a space stage with a replica of the space shuttle and a replica of the lunar lander. When the lunar lander moved onto the center of the field it opened up and Mr. William P. Suitor walked to a moon stage where he blasted off and soared around the stadium on his jet pack. Most people don't remember the halftime show, but they do remember the jet pack. There were additional smaller stages built on golf carts in the form of stars that moved around the field.

== Game summary ==
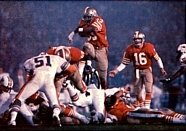
Roger Craig (middle) rushes past the Dolphins' defense during Super Bowl XIX.

Instead of the predicted shootout between quarterbacks Dan Marino and Joe Montana, the game was mostly one-sided. The 49ers' defense only allowed 25 rushing yards and 16 Dolphins points. San Francisco also intercepted Marino twice and sacked him 4 times. The Dolphins set a Super Bowl record for fewest rush attempts in a game (9).

=== First quarter ===
In the opening minutes of the game, it seemed that the game would live up to the hype. On the opening kickoff, 49ers running back/kick returner Derrick Harmon caught the ball too close to the sidelines and stepped out of bounds at the San Francisco 6-yard line. The 49ers managed to advance to their own 41, but were forced to punt, and Dolphins cornerback Fulton Walker returned the punt 8 yards to the Miami 36-yard line. Then on their first play of the drive, Marino completed a 25-yard pass to running back Tony Nathan. Four plays later, Miami reached the San Francisco 23-yard line. But on third down, 49ers cornerback Eric Wright tackled wide receiver Mark Clayton 2 yards shy of the first down. The Dolphins had to settle for a 37-yard field goal from kicker Uwe von Schamann to give them an early 3–0 lead.

Miami's lead did not last long, as San Francisco stormed down the field on their next possession. The 49ers drove 78 yards in 8 plays, which featured a 16-yard run by Montana, followed by his 33-yard touchdown pass to running back Carl Monroe to give them their first lead of the game, 7–3. But Miami retook the lead on their ensuing drive. After a 5-yard rush by Nathan, the Dolphins went into a no-huddle offense, preventing the 49ers from making substitutions and keeping their run defense on the field. Marino completed five consecutive passes, hitting Clayton for 18 yards, wide receiver Mark Duper for 11, Clayton again for 13, and tight end Dan Johnson for 21. On the next play, Marino finished the drive by hitting Johnson for a 2-yard touchdown pass, giving the Dolphins a 10–7 lead with 45 seconds left in the first quarter.

=== Second quarter ===
In the second quarter, the 49ers began to take control of the game. After being forced to punt, Bill Walsh switched to a 4–1–6 (or dime defense) to slow down the Dolphins' passing attack, with Keena Turner as the sole linebacker. Miami tried to run against the 4–1–6 alignment, to no avail. Safety Dwight Hicks broke up two consecutive Marino passes, and the Dolphins were forced to punt from their own 10-yard line. Then after taking the ball at the Miami 47-yard line, Montana scrambled for a 19-yard run, and then completed a 16-yard pass to wide receiver Dwight Clark to reach the 12-yard line. From there, running back Wendell Tyler rushed for 4 yards, and then Montana threw an 8-yard touchdown pass to running back Roger Craig, putting the 49ers back in front with a 14–10 lead.

San Francisco never trailed again for the rest of the game. Miami then had to punt again on their ensuing possession, and 49ers cornerback Dana McLemore returned the ball 28 yards to the 49ers 45-yard line. After advancing 15 yards with two running plays by Tyler and Craig, Montana completed a pair of passes to tight end Russ Francis to move the ball 29 yards to the Miami 11-yard line. Craig ran for 5 yards on the next play, and then Montana finished the drive himself with a 6-yard touchdown run, increasing San Francisco's lead to 21–10. After the ensuing kickoff, the Dolphins again were forced to punt after a three-and-out, and McLemore returned Reggie Roby's 39-yard punt 10 yards to the 49ers 48-yard line. Montana was sacked for a 5-yard loss by defensive end Doug Betters on the first play of the ensuing drive, but he struck back with a 20-yard completion to Craig and a 7-yard run over the next two plays. On the next play, wide receiver Freddie Solomon appeared to catch a pass from Montana at the 12 before losing a fumble to safety Lyle Blackwood. However, field judge Bob Lewis blew the play dead, ruling that Solomon's fumble was an incomplete pass. Bill Quinby, the side judge, who was nearest to the play, did not make any call. Five plays later, Craig finished the 9-play, 52-yard drive with his second touchdown of the game on a 2-yard run, increasing the 49ers' lead to 28–10.

With nearly two minutes left in the half, the Dolphins finally managed to get a good drive going on their next possession. Marino completed seven out of nine passes, the last one being a 30-yard pass to tight end Joe Rose, to reach the 49ers 12-yard line. However, San Francisco's defense tightened up on the next three plays, forcing two incompletions and a completed pass for no gain, and Miami was forced to settle for von Schamann's 31-yard field goal to cut their deficit to 28–13 with 12 seconds left in the half. Then the Dolphins caught a break as the 49ers botched the ensuing kickoff. San Francisco guard Guy McIntyre received von Schamann's short kick and was about to down the ball, but then changed his mind at the last second and decided to return it after being urged by teammates Monroe and Harmon. This turned out to be a mistake; McIntyre fumbled while being leveled by running back Joe Carter, and wide receiver Jim Jensen recovered the ball for Miami at the San Francisco 12. After that, von Schamann kicked a 30-yard field goal on the last play of the half, cutting the Dolphins' deficit to 28–16. "I can laugh about the play now, but it wasn't funny at the time," McIntyre said after the game. "My first instinct when I got the ball was to fall down. Then I heard everyone yelling, 'Get up! Get up!' So I got up, and here comes someone sneaking underneath me, and he hit the ball."

=== Second half ===
Any thoughts of a Dolphins comeback ended early in the third quarter, as they were shut out by the 49ers for the rest of the game. On the first play of the second half, San Francisco defensive end Dwaine Board tackled Nathan for a 1-yard loss. After an incompletion, Board sacked Marino for a 9-yard loss on third down, and McLemore returned Roby's 45-yard punt 8 yards to the 49ers 47. Montana went on to complete a 14-yard pass to Tyler and gain 16 yards on a scramble as he led San Francisco 43 yards in 9 plays to score on kicker Ray Wersching's 27-yard field goal, increasing their lead to 31–16. On the Dolphins' ensuing drive, they were forced to punt again after Marino was sacked twice, first by defensive tackle Manu Tuiasosopo, then by Board. Starting on their own 30-yard line after a 5-yard return by McLemore, Montana completed a 40-yard pass to Tyler, followed by a 13-yard pass to Francis to reach the Miami 17. Three plays later, Craig scored his third touchdown of the game on a 16-yard reception to make the score 38–16. Craig's third touchdown marked the first time in Super Bowl history that the same player scored three touchdowns, and also proved to be the last score from either team, as the defenses of both teams took over for the rest of the game – especially the 49ers' defense, who intercepted Marino twice. On Miami's ensuing drive following Craig's third touchdown, Wright intercepted a pass intended for Clayton at the 49ers 1-yard line. Montana then managed to escape a safety by completing a 9-yard pass to Craig. After the Dolphins were forced to punt on their first possession of the final period, McLemore fumbled the catch, and wide receiver Vince Heflin recovered the ball for Miami at the San Francisco 21. On the next play, however, Marino was intercepted again, this time in the end zone by safety Carlton Williamson. The 49ers responded by driving to the Dolphins 2-yard line on a 33-yard reception by Clark, only to then turn the ball over on downs with less than three minutes remaining in the game. Miami then reached the San Francisco 30 to end the game.

=== Highlights ===
Overall, San Francisco gained a Super Bowl-record 537 yards, breaking the Oakland Raiders' record of 429 yards in Super Bowl XI, while limiting Miami to 314, with just 25 rushing yards. San Francisco's 38 points also tied a Super Bowl record set by the Raiders in Super Bowl XVIII.

The 49ers' 288 offensive yards in the first half also tied the Raiders in Super Bowl XI for the most offensive yards in a half during a Super Bowl.

Marino finished the game with 29 out of 50 pass completions for 318 yards, 1 touchdown, and 2 interceptions. Clayton was the top receiver of the game, with 6 receptions for 92 yards. Walker returned 4 kickoffs for 93 yards and gained 15 yards on 2 punt returns. Nathan was the Dolphins leading rusher with 18 yards, while also catching 10 passes for 83 yards. Craig had 58 rushing yards, 77 receiving yards, and 3 touchdowns. He was the first player to score 3 touchdowns in a Super Bowl, and his 2 touchdown catches also tied a Super Bowl record. Tyler led San Francisco in rushing with 65 yards, and also caught 4 passes for 70 yards. Clark caught 6 passes for 77 yards. Board recorded 2 sacks. McLemore recorded 51 punt return yards, the second most in Super Bowl history. Sports Illustrated called 49ers defensive tackle Gary Johnson the Super Bowl's "unofficial defensive MVP" after he recorded one sack, flushed Marino out of the pocket numerous times, and had four unassisted tackles.

49ers rookie defensive tackle Michael Carter became the first athlete to win an Olympic medal and Super Bowl ring in the same year. Before this game he had won a silver medal in the shot put competition at the 1984 Summer Olympics.

This would be the final game for San Francisco linebacker Jack Reynolds.

== Reactions ==
After the game, Lyle Blackwood criticized the referee's ruling of Freddie Solomon's fumble as an incomplete pass. "You don't want the game to hinge on that play, but you never know," Blackwood said. "I could have taken the ball up the sideline. That's a 14-point swing." However, other Dolphins were not convinced. "We were dominated to the point where one play didn't make much of a difference," said Dolphins coach Don Shula. "Our major objective was to contain Montana, and we did a terrible, terrible job of it," added defensive coach Chuck Studley. Even Reggie Roby, who averaged only 39.3 yards per punt and didn't place any of his 6 punts inside the 20, took some responsibility for the loss. "I was trying to kill the ball, and I kicked it bad," he said. "I didn't hit one well. I was scared – scared to make a mistake. It was the worst game of my life, counting high school, college, counting everything." Meanwhile, in the 49ers' locker room, Joe Montana had his own explanation for the win. "As far as my own game, well, I'd have to admit it was pretty close to the best I've ever played. I didn't throw anything I didn't have confidence in. We got in sort of a groove. Once you get going like that you gain confidence, and it carries over to the defense, and then back to the offense. It's a snowball kind of thing."

The 49ers' offensive line dominated the Dolphins' undersized defensive line, a major reason why Montana was only sacked once. Offensive line coach Bobb McKittrick recalled that when he and his linemen looked at film of the game, they were surprised at how one-sided the matchup was. According to McKittrick, he and the linemen wondered, "This is a Super Bowl defense?"

Walsh recalled that he could see "a distinct difference" between his 49ers and the Dolphins during warmups. According to Walsh, it was obvious that the Dolphins were "a one-dimensional team" with no real ground game to compliment Marino's passing, and were nowhere near as physical as the 49ers.

=== Box score ===
Super Bowl XIX: San Francisco 49ers 38, Miami Dolphins 16

Quarter	1	2	3	4	Total
Dolphins (AFC)	10	6	0	0	16
49ers (NFC)	7	21	10	0	38

at Stanford Stadium, Stanford, California

- Date: January 20, 1985
- Game time: 3:19 p.m. PST
- Game weather: 53 °F (12 °C), cloudy, fog for much of the second half

Scoring summary

Quarter	Time	Drive			Team	Scoring information	Score	
Quarter	Time	Plays	Yards	TOP	Team	Scoring information	MIA	SF
1	7:24	7	45	3:50	MIA	37-yard field goal by Uwe von Schamann	3	0
1	3:12	8	78	4:12	SF	Carl Monroe 33-yard touchdown reception from Joe Montana, Ray Wersching kick good	3	7
1	0:45	6	70	2:27	MIA	Dan Johnson 2-yard touchdown reception from Dan Marino, von Schamann kick good	10	7
2	11:34	4	47	1:25	SF	Roger Craig 8-yard touchdown reception from Montana, Wersching kick good	10	14
2	6:58	6	55	2:43	SF	Montana 6-yard touchdown run, Wersching kick good	10	21
2	2:05	9	52	3:39	SF	Craig 2-yard touchdown run, Wersching kick good	10	28
2	0:12	12	72	1:53	MIA	31-yard field goal by von Schamann	13	28
2	0:00	1	0	0:04	MIA	30-yard field goal by von Schamann	16	28
3	10:12	10	43	3:28	SF	27-yard field goal by Wersching	16	31
3	6:18	5	70	2:20	SF	Craig 16-yard touchdown reception from Montana, Wersching kick good	16	38
"TOP" = time of possession. For other American football terms, see Glossary of American football.							16	38

== Final statistics ==
Sources: NFL.com Super Bowl XIX, Super Bowl XIX Play Finder SF, Super Bowl XIX Play Finder Mia

=== Statistical comparison ===
	Miami Dolphins	San Francisco 49ers
First downs	19	31
First downs rushing	2	16
First downs passing	17	15
First downs penalty	0	0
Third down efficiency	4/12	6/11
Fourth down efficiency	0/0	0/1
Net yards rushing	25	211
Rushing attempts	9	40
Yards per rush	2.8	5.3
Passing – Completions/attempts	29/50	24/35
Times sacked-total yards	4–29	1–5
Interceptions thrown	2	0
Net yards passing	289	326
Total net yards	314	537
Punt returns-total yards	2–15	5–51
Kickoff returns-total yards	7–140	4–40
Interceptions-total return yards	0–0	2–0
Punts-average yardage	6–39.3	3–32.7
Fumbles-lost	1–0	2–2
Penalties-total yards	1–10	2–10
Time of possession	22:49	37:11
Turnovers	2	2

=== Individual statistics ===
Dolphins passing
	C/ATT^{1}	Yds	TD	INT	Rating
Dan Marino	29/50	318	1	2	66.9
Dolphins rushing
	Att^{2}	Yds	TD	LG^{3}	Yds/Att
Tony Nathan	5	18	0	16	3.60
Woody Bennett	3	7	0	7	2.33
Dan Marino	1	0	0	0	0.00
Dolphins receiving
	Rec^{4}	Yds	TD	LG^{3}	Target^{5}
Tony Nathan	10	83	0	25	11
Mark Clayton	6	92	0	27	14
Joe Rose	6	73	0	30	7
Dan Johnson	3	28	1	21	3
Nat Moore	2	17	0	9	5
Jimmy Cefalo	1	14	0	14	3
Mark Duper	1	11	0	11	4
Bruce Hardy	0	0	0	0	1

49ers passing
	C/ATT^{1}	Yds	TD	INT	Rating
Joe Montana	24/35	331	3	0	127.2
49ers rushing
	Att^{2}	Yds	TD	LG^{3}	Yds/Att
Wendell Tyler	13	65	0	9	5.00
Joe Montana	5	59	1	19	11.80
Roger Craig	15	58	1	10	3.87
Derrick Harmon	5	20	0	7	4.00
Freddie Solomon	1	5	0	5	5.00
Earl Cooper	1	4	0	4	4.00
49ers receiving
	Rec^{4}	Yds	TD	LG^{3}	Target^{5}
Roger Craig	7	77	2	20	8
Dwight Clark	6	77	0	33	7
Russ Francis	5	60	0	19	6
Wendell Tyler	4	70	0	40	5
Carl Monroe	1	33	1	33	1
Freddie Solomon	1	14	0	14	4
Renaldo Nehemiah	0	0	0	0	2
Mike Wilson	0	0	0	0	2

^{1}Completions/attempts ^{2}Rushing attempts ^{3}Long gain ^{4}Receptions ^{5}Times targeted

=== Records set ===
The following records were set in Super Bowl XIX, according to the official NFL.com boxscore and the Pro-Football-Reference.com game summary.
Some records have to meet NFL minimum number of attempts to be recognized. The minimums are shown (in parentheses).

Player records set
Most points scored, game	18	Roger Craig (San Francisco)
Most touchdowns, game	3	Roger Craig (San Francisco)
Passing records
Most attempts, game	50	Dan Marino (Miami)
Most completions, game	29	Dan Marino (Miami)
Highest completion percentage, career, (40 attempts)	66.6% (38–57)	Joe Montana (San Francisco)
Most passing yards, game	331 yards	Joe Montana (San Francisco)
Most attempts, without interception, game	35	Joe Montana (San Francisco)
Rushing records
Most rushing yards, game, Quarterback	59 yards	Joe Montana
Special Teams
Most kickoff return yards, career	283 yards	Fulton Walker (Miami)
Highest kickoff return average, career (4 returns)	35.4 yards (8–283)	Fulton Walker (Miami)
Highest punt return average, career (4 returns)	10.2 yards (5–51)	Dana McLemore (San Francisco)
Most field goals made, career	5	Ray Wersching (San Francisco)
Records tied
Lowest percentage, passes had intercepted, career, (40 attempts)	0% (0–57)	Joe Montana
Most receiving touchdowns, game	2	Roger Craig
Most kickoff returns, career	8	Fulton Walker
Most (one point) extra points, game	5	Ray Wersching

Team records set
Points
Most points scored, first half	28	49ers
Most points scored in any quarter of play	21 (2nd)	49ers
Most points, second quarter	21	49ers
Net yards
Most net yards, rushing and passing	537	49ers
Rushing
Fewest rushing attempts	9	Dolphins
Passing
Most passing attempts	50	Dolphins
Most passes completed	29	Dolphins
Most yards passing (net)	326	49ers
First downs
Most first downs	31	49ers
Most first downs rushing	16	49ers
Most first downs, passing	17	Dolphins
Records tied
Most points, game	38	49ers
Most touchdowns, game	5	49ers
Most (one point) PATs	5	49ers
Most Super Bowl appearances	5	Dolphins
Fewest points, second half	0	Dolphins
Fewest rushing touchdowns	0	Dolphins
Most kickoff returns, game	7	Dolphins

Records set, both team totals
	Total	49ers	Dolphins
Points, Both Teams
Most points scored, first half	44	28	16
Most points, first quarter	17	7	10
Most points, second quarter	27	21	6
Net yards, Both Teams
Most net yards, rushing and passing	851	537	314
Rushing, Both Teams
Fewest rushing attempts	49	40	9
Passing, Both Teams
Most passing attempts	85	35	50
Most passes completed	53	24	29
Most passing yards (net)	615	326	289
First downs, Both Teams
Most first downs	50	31	19
Most first downs, passing	32	15	17
Records tied, both team totals
Most field goals made	4	3	1
Fewest first downs, penalty	0	0	0
Most kickoff returns	11	4	7

== Starting lineups ==
Hall of Fame ‡

Miami	Position	Position	San Francisco
Offense
Mark Duper	WR		Dwight Clark
Jon Giesler	LT		Bubba Paris
Roy Foster	LG		John Ayers
Dwight Stephenson‡	C		Fred Quillan
Ed Newman	RG		Randy Cross
Cleveland Green	RT		Keith Fahnhorst
Bruce Hardy	TE		Russ Francis
Mark Clayton	WR		Freddie Solomon
Dan Marino‡	QB		Joe Montana‡
Tony Nathan	RB		Wendell Tyler
Woody Bennett	FB		Roger Craig‡
Defense
Doug Betters	LE		Lawrence Pillers
Bob Baumhower	NT		Manu Tuiasosopo
Kim Bokamper	RE		Dwaine Board
Bob Brudzinski	LOLB		Dan Bunz
Jay Brophy	LILB		Riki Ellison
Mark Brown	RILB		Jack Reynolds
Charles Bowser	ROLB		Keena Turner
Don McNeal	LCB		Ronnie Lott‡
William Judson	RCB		Eric Wright
Glenn Blackwood	SS		Carlton Williamson
Lyle Blackwood	FS		Dwight Hicks

== Officials ==
- Referee: Pat Haggerty #40 third Super Bowl (XIII, XVI)
- Umpire: Tom Hensley #19 first Super Bowl
- Head linesman: Leo Miles #35 third Super Bowl (VIII, X)
- Line judge: Ray Dodez #74 first Super Bowl
- Back judge: Tom Kelleher #25 fifth Super Bowl (IV, VII, XI, XV)
- Side judge: Bill Quinby #58 first Super Bowl
- Field judge: Bob Lewis #18 first Super Bowl
- Alternate referee: Jerry Markbreit #9 worked Super Bowls XVII, XXI, XXVI, XXIX on field
- Alternate umpire: Bob Boylston #101 worked Super Bowls XXI, XXVI on field

Tom Kelleher became the first official to work five Super Bowls, a record which has been tied by four other officials, but never surpassed.
