= Bob Baumhower =

American football player (born 1955)

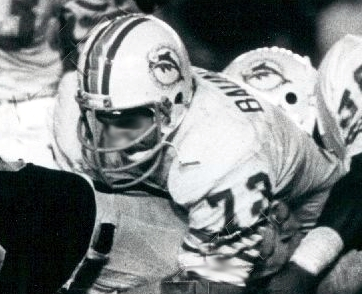
- Baumhower with the Miami Dolphins in 1979

No. 73
- Position: Defensive tackle

Personal information
- Born: August 4, 1955 (age 71); Portsmouth, Virginia, U.S.
- Listed height: 6 ft 5 in (1.96 m)
- Listed weight: 261 lb (118 kg)

Career information
- High school: Palm Beach Gardens (Palm Beach Gardens, Florida)
- College: Alabama
- NFL draft: 1977: 2nd round, 40th overall pick

Career history
- Miami Dolphins (1977–1986)

Awards and highlights
- 2× First-team All-Pro (1981, 1983); 3× Second-team All-Pro (1979, 1982, 1984); 5× Pro Bowl (1979, 1981–1984); PFWA All-Rookie Team (1977); Miami Dolphins Honor Roll; Third-team All-American (1975); 2× First-team All-SEC (1975, 1976)

Career NFL statistics
- Sacks: 14.5 (Note: Sacks were not officially recorded in the NFL until the 1982 season. Baumhower is unofficially credited with 39.5 career sacks.)
- Total tackles: 888
- Interceptions: 1
- Fumble recoveries: 16
- Stats at Pro Football Reference

Robert Glenn Baumhower (born August 4, 1955) is an American former professional football player who was a defensive tackle for the Miami Dolphins in the National Football League (NFL). He played college football for the Alabama Crimson Tide under coach Bear Bryant from 1973 to 1976 and professionally for Miami under coach Don Shula. He later became a restaurateur.

== Early life and college ==
Baumhower attended Palm Beach Gardens High School in Florida for two seasons before playing at Tuscaloosa High School his senior year.

Playing as a defensive tackle in college at the University of Alabama under coach Bear Bryant, Baumhower helped lead the Crimson Tide to two 11–1 records as well as a 31–4 overall record. He was part of the 1974 team which lost to Notre Dame in the Orange Bowl, the 1975 team which defeated Penn State in the Sugar Bowl, and the 1976 team which won the Liberty Bowl over UCLA. Baumhower was a first-team All-Southeastern Conference selection in both 1975 and 1976. After the 1976 season, he was invited to play in the Senior Bowl college all-star game.

== Professional career ==
Baumhower was drafted by the Dolphins with the 40th overall pick (second round) in the 1977 NFL draft, behind the first round pick, another defensive lineman from the Southeastern Conference, A. J. Duhe of LSU; earning a spot on the 1977 All-Rookie team. Baumhower and Duhe would share the 1977 Defensive Rookie of the Year honors. He was selected five times to the Pro Bowl in the NFL.

Baumhower and Duhe, who eventually was moved to inside linebacker, formed the heart of the Dolphins' "Killer B's" defense of the late 1970s through mid-1980s, coached by defensive coordinator Bill Arnsparger. Baumhower was flanked on the line by ends Doug Betters and Kim Bokamper, while other stars of the unit included outside linebacker Bob Brudzinski and defensive backs Lyle Blackwood and Glenn Blackwood. The unit was ranked first in the NFL in total defense in 1982, when Miami reached Super Bowl XVII.

The 1983 season may have been Baumhower's best as he was named NFL Defensive Player of the Year (Pro Football Weekly), first-team All-Pro (Associated Press), first-team All-AFC (United Press International) and a starter in the Pro Bowl game. He was a first-team All-NFL selection in 1981 and 1983 and first-team All-AFC in 1979, 1981 and 1983.

Baumhower would retire after the 1986 season. He was inducted into the Alabama Sports Hall of Fame in 1995.

On December 14, 2008, Baumhower was inducted into The Miami Dolphin Honor Roll during a ceremony at Dolphin Stadium (now Hard Rock Stadium).

Year	Age	Team	Position	No.	Games	Started	INTs	FF	Fmb	FR	Def. Yds	Def. TD	Sk	AV
1977	22	MIA	NT	73	14	14	0	0	0	3	0	0	0	7
1978	23	MIA	NT	73	16	16	1	0	0	2	13	1	0	7
1979	24	MIA	NT	73	16	16	0	0	0	1	0	0	0	11
1980	25	MIA	NT	73	16	16	0	0	0	4	14	0	0	9
1981	26	MIA	NT	73	16	16	0	0	0	3	10	0	0	13
1982	27	MIA	NT	73	9	8	0	0	0	0	0	0	3.5	15
1983	28	MIA	NT	73	16	16	0	0	0	1	0	0	8.0	18
1984	29	MIA	NT	73	15	15	0	0	0	2	23	1	2.0	13
1986	31	MIA	NT	73	12	12	0	0	0	0	0	0	1.0	3
Career					130	129	1	0	0	16	60	2	14.5	96

== Restaurants ==
Baumhower is also the owner and CEO of Aloha Hospitality, which owns and operates restaurants throughout Alabama including the fine dining establishment Dauphin's in Mobile as well as his namesake Baumhower's Victory Grille.
