= Tommy Hensley =

American football official (1932–1994)

Thomas B. Hensley (July 30, 1932 – October 30, 1994) was an American football official in the National Football League (NFL) from 1967 to 1987. During his time in the NFL, he was selected as the umpire for Super Bowl XIX in 1985. He wore uniform number 19 during his NFL career, which was later worn by Scott Green, and is currently worn by Clay Martin.

== Biography ==
He attended Central High School in Knoxville, Tennessee, where he was inducted into the Wall of Fame in November 2009. He played football at the University of Tennessee for the years. His teammates at UT included Doug Atkins and Johnny Majors.

A Knoxville News Sentinel "Sports Brief" prior to his junior year said, "Tommy Hensley, age 20, 6 foot 190 pound junior (actually 6–2 and 220 pounds), from Knoxville lettered last year as a defensive tackle. His performances on offense during the spring increased his potential value to the team. (He) has good speed and is a conscientious worker ranked with the top tackle on the squad."

Hensley was the linesman, and later umpire, on the crew of referee Bernie Ulman from 1967–74.

He was inducted into the Knoxville Sports Hall of Fame.

He died from cancer at his home in Fountain City on October 30, 1994.

== See also ==
- 1984 NFL season
- NFL playoffs, 1984-85
