= Lyle Blackwood =

American football player (born 1951)

No. 29, 28, 44, 42
- Position: Safety

Personal information
- Born: May 24, 1951 (age 75); San Antonio, Texas, U.S.
- Listed height: 6 ft 1 in (1.85 m)
- Listed weight: 190 lb (86 kg)

Career information
- High school: Winston Churchill (San Antonio)
- College: TCU
- NFL draft: 1973: 9th round, 217 (by the Denver Broncos)th overall pick

Career history
- Cincinnati Bengals (1973–1975); Seattle Seahawks (1976); Baltimore Colts (1977–1980); Miami Dolphins (1981–1986)

Awards and highlights
- NFL interceptions leader (1977); First-team All-SWC (1972); Second-team All-SWC (1971)

Career NFL statistics
- Interceptions: 35
- Fumble recoveries: 15
- Touchdowns: 2
- Stats at Pro Football Reference

Lyle Vernon Blackwood (born May 24, 1951) is an American former professional football player who was a safety in the National Football League (NFL). Blackwood's best season was in 1977, when he intercepted 10 passes for the Baltimore Colts, helping them win their third consecutive AFC East division title. He later became known for teaming alongside his brother, Glenn Blackwood with the Miami Dolphins as part of the notorious "Killer B's" defense. The two Blackwoods referred to themselves as "The Bruise Brothers."

While a Dolphin, Blackwood played alongside greats such as hall of famer Dwight Stephenson, Bob Baumhower, Bob Brudzinski, A. J. Duhe and his brother Glenn. This formidable team won several division titles (1981, 1983, 1984, 1985) and made two Super Bowl appearances (1982, 1984).

A similar Dolphin team with the "Killer B's" and company upset the 1985 Chicago Bears (15–1) and kept them from an undefeated season.

With Blackwood on defense, the "Killer B's" complemented Miami's strong offensive unit guided by hall of fame quarterback Dan Marino, wide receivers Mark Duper and Mark Clayton: "The Marks Brothers" along with coach Don Shula.

Blackwood played a total of 14 seasons in the NFL. He was born in San Antonio, Texas and attended Texas Christian University. He finished his career with 35 interceptions and 9 defensive fumble recoveries. In 1977, he led the NFL interceptions with 10.

Blackwood was a member of the Seattle Seahawks during their inaugural season.
