= Steve Howell =

American football player (born 1956)

No. 36
- Position: Fullback

Personal information
- Born: December 20, 1956 (age 69); Corsicana, Texas, U.S.
- Listed height: 6 ft 2 in (1.88 m)
- Listed weight: 227 lb (103 kg)

Career information
- High school: Waxahachie (Waxahachie, Texas)
- College: Baylor
- NFL draft: 1979: 4th round, 107th overall pick

Career history
- Miami Dolphins (1979–1981); Philadelphia Eagles (1981)*; Arizona Wranglers (1983)
- * Offseason or practice squad member only

Career NFL statistics
- Rushing yards: 235
- Rushing average: 3.5
- Rushing touchdowns: 1
- Stats at Pro Football Reference

Stephen Glen Howell (born December 20, 1956) is an American former professional football player who was a fullback for the Miami Dolphins of the National Football League (NFL). He played college football for the Baylor Bears. He was also a member of the Philadelphia Eagles and played in the United States Football League (USFL) for the Arizona Wranglers.

After his football career, Howell served as a softball coach until retiring in 2022.
