= Kim Bokamper =

American football player (born 1954)

No. 58
- Positions: Linebacker, defensive end

Personal information
- Born: September 25, 1954 (age 72); San Diego, California, U.S.
- Listed height: 6 ft 6 in (1.98 m)
- Listed weight: 250 lb (113 kg)

Career information
- High school: Milpitas (Milpitas, California)
- College: Concordia College,Moorhead MN San Jose City College San Jose State
- NFL draft: 1976: 1st round, 19th overall pick

Career history
- Miami Dolphins (1976–1985)

Awards and highlights
- Pro Bowl (1979); PFWA All-Rookie Team (1977); Dolphins Walk of Fame (2013); Second-team All-American (1975)

Career NFL statistics
- Sacks: 12
- Interceptions: 6
- Touchdowns: 1
- Stats at Pro Football Reference

Kim Bokamper (born September 25, 1954) is an American former professional football player who spent his entire nine-year career as a linebacker and defensive end in the National Football League (NFL) with the Miami Dolphins from 1977 to 1985.

Bokamper was selected 19th overall in the first round of the 1976 NFL draft by the Dolphins after playing college football for the San Jose State Spartans. He was a member of the Dolphins' Killer B's defense of the early 1980s and was a one-time Pro Bowler in 1979.

Bokamper started at right defensive end for the Dolphins in Super Bowl XVII and Super Bowl XIX. Against the Washington Redskins in Super Bowl XVII, he was involved in a play in which he deflected a pass attempt from Redskins quarterback Joe Theismann, and nearly intercepted the deflected pass in the end zone, for a touchdown. Theismann was able to knock the ball away from Bokamper, preventing the interception.

After retirement Bokamper became a broadcaster at WFOR-TV in Miami.

Bokamper can be heard on South Florida's Paul and Young Ron Show on WBGG-Miami anytime NFL news breaks. Bokamper was also part of the morning team on WQAM-AM along with Kenny Walker. In 2008, he hosted the weeknight Dolphins Tonight show on WQAM and opened a sports bar and restaurant in Plantation, Florida, called "Bokamper's Sports Bar & Grill". He has also opened Florida "Bokamper's Sports Bar & Grill" locations in Miramar, Estero, Naples and Fort Lauderdale.

Bokamper serves as the host of The Audible, a 30-minute program streamed live and via podcast from MiamiDolphins.com. On the program, Bokamper speaks with Dolphins personalities and gives viewers or listeners an inside look at the Dolphins team.

Bokamper's wife Colleen died in March 2014.
