= Glenn Blackwood =

American football player (born 1957)

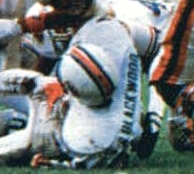
- Blackwood pictured in a defensive play for the Dolphins during the 1985 AFC Championship game

No. 47
- Position: Safety

Personal information
- Born: February 23, 1957 (age 69); San Antonio, Texas, U.S.
- Listed height: 6 ft 0 in (1.83 m)
- Listed weight: 187 lb (85 kg)

Career information
- High school: Winston Churchill (San Antonio, Texas)
- College: Texas
- NFL draft: 1979: 8th round, 215th overall pick

Career history
- Miami Dolphins (1979–1988)

Awards and highlights
- Co-National champion (Rothman(FACT)) (1977); 1978 Sun Bowl champion; 1975 Astro-Bluebonnet Bowl champion

Career NFL statistics
- Interceptions: 29
- Fumble recoveries: 14
- Touchdowns: 1
- Stats at Pro Football Reference

Glenn Allen Blackwood (born February 23, 1957) is an American former professional football player who was a safety for the Miami Dolphins for ten seasons in the National Football League (NFL). He was part of Dolphins' "Killer B's" defense and played in two Super Bowls. Prior to that he played college football for the Texas Longhorn, helping them to an undefeated regular season in 1977 and playing for the national championship in the Cotton Bowl that year.

== Early life ==
Blackwood was born in San Antonio, Texas and graduated from Churchill High School.

== College career ==
Blackwood attended the University of Texas where he played football from 1975 to 1978 and captained the 1978 team. He helped the Longhorns win a share of the 1975 Southwest Conference championship and win the Astro-Bluebonnet Bowl. He led the team in interceptions in 1977, when Texas was ranked #1 for most of the season, won the Southwest Conference Championship, fashioned a perfect 11-0 season and played for the National Championship in the Cotton Bowl. In 1978, he led the team to victory in the Sun Bowl and a #9 ranking at the end of the season.

He was named to the Longhorn Hall of Honor in 2020.

== Professional career ==
He was selected by the Miami Dolphins in the eighth round, 215th overall, of the 1979 NFL draft.

He became a starter in his rookie year, and continued to start until the end of his career. He helped the Dolphins win six division titles (1979, 1981-85) and to make it to Super Bowl XVII and Super Bowl XIX, both of which the Dolphins lost. He was a Dolphins nominee for the NFL Man of the Year and for the Ed Block Award for inspiration, sportsmanship and courage. In week 15 of the 1985 season, he was named the AFC Defensive player of the week. In 1982, he led the NFL in interception-return and non-offensive touchdowns. In both 1980 and 1983 he was in the top 10 for fumbles recovered, in 1984 he was 3rd for interception return yards and in 1985 he was in the top 10 for interceptions.

His brother Lyle Blackwood also played in the NFL, and they were teammates from 1981 through 1986 with the Miami Dolphins. On a Monday night game against Buffalo in 1981, Glenn at strong safety and Lyle at free safety ganged up to put some heavy hits on the Bills’ players, prompting a Miami sportswriter to dub them "The Bruise Brothers." The moniker stuck.

At the end of the 1987 he was injured and missed the entire 1988 season on the physically unable to perform list. In the offseason he was named a Plan B free agent, but was not picked up by another team.

Blackwood finished his career with 29 interceptions and 13 fumble recoveries.

In 2015, he was named to the Dolphins' 50 best players in their first 50 seasons.

== Personal life ==
Blackwood owns a home in Wellington, Florida. His son Glenn Jacob "Jake" Blackwood played football at Georgia Tech. Blackwood coached his son in high school, serving as head football coach of The King's Academy in West Palm Beach, Florida, in 2001 and 2002 and as an assistant football coach from 2003 to 2006.
