= Doug Betters =

American football player (born 1956)

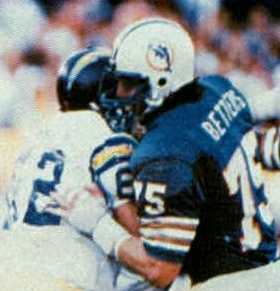
- Betters (75) with the Miami Dolphins in 1982

No. 75
- Position: Defensive end

Personal information
- Born: June 11, 1956 (age 70); Lincoln, Nebraska, U.S.
- Listed height: 6 ft 7 in (2.01 m)
- Listed weight: 262 lb (119 kg)

Career information
- High school: Arlington (Arlington Heights, Illinois)
- College: Montana; Nevada
- NFL draft: 1978: 6th round, 163rd overall pick

Career history
- Miami Dolphins (1978–1987)

Awards and highlights
- NFL Defensive Player of the Year (1983); First-team All-Pro (1983); Pro Bowl (1983); Miami Dolphins Honor Roll

Career NFL statistics
- Sacks: 64.5
- Fumble recoveries: 6
- Stats at Pro Football Reference

Douglas Lloyd Betters (born June 11, 1956) is an American former professional football player who was a defensive end for the Miami Dolphins of the National Football League (NFL) from 1978 to 1987.

After graduating from Arlington High School in Arlington Heights, Illinois, Betters played college Division I football for the Montana Grizzlies from 1974 to 1976, then transferred to play for the Nevada Wolf Pack in 1977. The next year, he was a sixth round draft pick for the Dolphins.

Betters was a part of Miami's "Killer B's" defense, and went to Super Bowl XVII and XIX. In 1983, Betters recorded 16 sacks in 16 games and won the NFL Defensive Player of the Year Award, and was named to the AFC Pro Bowl team. In '83 and '84, Betters was named the Miami Dolphins "Outstanding Defensive Lineman." Betters played 146 NFL games and made 64 1/2 career sacks (46 1/2 official, post–1981). He was named by the fans to the Dolphins' Silver Anniversary Team in 1991 and the Golden Anniversary Team in 2016. Betters was an assistant coach for the University of Montana Grizzlies in 1995 and 1996.

Betters guided fly fishing trips on the Flathead River in Montana for Glacier Wilderness Guides, and class 4 whitewater on the Lochsa River in Idaho for Lewis and Clark Trail Adventures after his retirement from the NFL.

In 1998, Betters suffered a spinal cord injury while skiing at Big Mountain in Whitefish, Montana.

Betters founded the Doug Betters Winter Classic Organization in 1985, which provides money for children in need of medical care. Betters is involved with numerous other charitable organizations, including the Special Olympics and United Way. In 2002, he received the Big Brothers/Big Sisters of Montana Award. As of 2014 he resides in Whitefish.

On December 14, 2008, Betters was inducted into the Miami Dolphins Ring of Honor during a ceremony at Dolphin Stadium.
