= A. J. Duhe =

American football player (born 1955)

No. 77
- Positions: Linebacker, defensive end

Personal information
- Born: November 27, 1955 (age 70); Reserve, Louisiana, U.S.
- Listed height: 6 ft 4 in (1.93 m)
- Listed weight: 247 lb (112 kg)

Career information
- High school: Leon Godchaux (Reserve)
- College: LSU
- NFL draft: 1977: 1st round, 13th overall pick

Career history
- Miami Dolphins (1977–1984)

Awards and highlights
- NFL Defensive Rookie of the Year (1977); Pro Bowl (1984); PFWA All-Rookie Team (1977); Dolphins Walk of Fame (2012); First-team All-SEC (1976)

Career NFL statistics
- Games played: 108
- Sacks: 38.5
- Interceptions: 3
- Stats at Pro Football Reference

Adam Joseph Duhe Jr. (born November 27, 1955) is an American former professional football player who was a linebacker and defensive end for eight seasons with the Miami Dolphins from 1977 to 1984 in the National Football League (NFL). He played college football for the LSU Tigers. In the NFL, Duhe is perhaps best known for his performance in the 1982 AFC championship game, when he intercepted New York Jets quarterback Richard Todd three times, which remains a conference championship game record. He was selected to the Pro Bowl in 1984 but did not play again after that season due to injuries.

Since retiring, Duhe has done some work as an actor and later worked for Caesars Entertainment. He is an inductee of the Greater New Orleans Sports Hall of Fame, the Louisiana Sports Hall of Fame, and the Miami Dolphins Walk of Fame.

== Early life ==
Adam Joseph Duhe Jr. was born in Reserve, Louisiana, on November 27, 1955. Duhe played football at Leon Godchaux High School on offense and defense, earning selections for All-District on both sides in his senior year, with him serving as defensive end and punter. He enrolled at Louisiana State University (LSU) and starred as defensive tackle for the Tigers with an All-SEC and All-Academic honors. During his collegiate career, Duhe averaged 72 tackles per season. He participated in the 1976 Senior Bowl and was declared "the most outstanding South defensive players" by sportswriter Ken Ernst of the Sun Herald.

== Career ==
He was drafted 13th overall in the first round of the 1977 NFL draft by the Miami Dolphins. He arrived late to training camp as a rookie because "agent Howard Slusher tried to make Duhe the wealthiest 21-year-old from St. John the Baptist Parish," according to The Times-Picayune, before eventually signing an initial three-year, $350,000 contract. Duhe was the AP NFL Defensive Rookie of the Year in his rookie year; unofficially, in his rookie year at Miami, he recorded seven sacks while recording 83 tackles. In the following season, Duhe compiled eight sacks, two fumble recoveries, and one forced fumble. He switched from defensive end to inside linebacker in 1980. Against the New England Patriots on the road in the 10th week of the 1981 season, Duhe recorded the first interception of his NFL career in a 30-27 overtime victory.

One of the highlights of Duhe's career occurred during the 1982 AFC championship game. He intercepted Richard Todd three times as the Dolphins defeated the New York Jets 14–0, returning the third of those for 35 yards for a touchdown in the fourth quarter to seal Miami's trip to Super Bowl XVII. He also recorded an interception in the Super Bowl that year. The three interceptions remain a record for conference championship games and was later tied by Ty Law and Ricky Manning in the 2003 AFC and NFC championship games, respectively.

He was a one-time Pro Bowler, in 1984. His last season saw the Dolphins reach Super Bowl XIX (with him starting eight games and playing in four others due to grueling workouts from him), but he played for only a small portion due to a knee problem that left him unable to move laterally and a shoulder with diminished hitting capacity. By the time he was 29, he had already gone through four surgeries for problems with torn ligaments and shoulders. In August 1985, the Dolphins placed Duhe on medical waivers and then released him, which meant he received just over twenty percent of his planned $275,000 salary.

Although initially expressing optimism about making a comeback in the NFL, Duhe instead retired by April 1986, following an incident where he felt sharp knee pain while playing racquetball with his wife. He finished his NFL career with 38.5 sacks, 6 forced fumbles, 6 fumble recoveries, and 3 interceptions, while appearing in 108 games, 89 of them as a starter.

== Personal life and honors ==
Duhe also has done work as an actor. Duhe was inducted into the Louisiana Sports Hall of Fame in 2001, the Miami Dolphins Walk of Fame in 2012, and the Greater New Orleans Sports Hall of Fame in 2018. As of that year, he was working for Caesars Entertainment while residing in Fort Lauderdale with his wife, with whom he has three children.
