= Bob Brudzinski =

American football player (born 1955)

No. 59
- Position: Linebacker

Personal information
- Born: January 1, 1955 (age 71); Fremont, Ohio, U.S.
- Listed height: 6 ft 4 in (1.93 m)
- Listed weight: 230 lb (104 kg)

Career information
- High school: Fremont Ross (Fremont)
- College: Ohio State
- NFL draft: 1977: 1st round, 23rd overall pick

Career history
- Los Angeles Rams (1977–1980); Miami Dolphins (1981–1989)

Awards and highlights
- PFWA All-Rookie Team (1977); Consensus All-American (1976); 2× First-team All-Big Ten (1975, 1976)

Career NFL statistics
- Sacks: 22.5
- Interceptions: 9
- Touchdowns: 1
- Stats at Pro Football Reference

Robert Louis Brudzinski (born January 1, 1955) is an American former professional football player who was a linebacker for 13 seasons in the National Football League (NFL), primarily with the Miami Dolphins. He played college football for the Ohio State Buckeyes, earning consensus All-American honors in 1976.

== Ohio State ==
Brudzinski was a four-time letter winner and a three-year starter at defensive end for the Ohio State Buckeyes. He was a two-time All-Big Ten Conference selection and as a senior in 1976, he was a consensus All-America choice. In his 43 games for Ohio State he totaled 214 tackles and in 1976 he intercepted four passes, a high number for a defensive end. In 2000 Brudzinski was voted to the Ohio State Football All-Century Team.

== Los Angeles Rams ==
The Los Angeles Rams drafted Brudzinski in the first round with the 23rd overall pick in the first round of the 1977 NFL draft. The Rams planned moving him to outside linebacker, to match his 4.7 speed and good strength. He started as a rookie because starting middle linebacker Jack Reynolds held out for the first one-third of the season. While starting left linebacker Jim Youngblood moved to the middle to fill in for Reynolds, Brudzinski started at left linebacker. He ended up starting seven games and recording 37 tackles, two interceptions, three forced fumbles and one sack. He was voted All-Rookie by UPI and PFWA and FD for his efforts in 1977. In 1978, he became the starter at right outside linebacker in week 10 when Isiah Robertson walked out of camp purported with complaints about his salary. The Rams defense was ranked #1 in the NFL at the time and in the 2 1/2 months with Brudzinski starting they never fell from the top status. He ended the year with 43 tackles, intercepted a pass that went for a touchdown and two quarterback sacks.

In 1979 Brudzinski had his best year to date. Making all 16 starts as the RLB and being named 2nd-team All-pro by the Gannett Wire Service. "Bru" as his teammates called him, amassed 127 tackles, with 7 of those for a loss, plus 5 sacks, he intercepted a pass, forced a fumble, recovered one and broke up 14 passes, either at the line of scrimmage or in coverage. The Rams went through the NFC playoffs beating the Dallas Cowboys and Tampa Bay Buccaneers before losing Super Bowl XIV to the Pittsburgh Steelers.

Two-thirds into the 1980 season Brudzinski walked out and never returned to the Rams. To date, he had made 35 tackles and had 6 passes defensed plus a sack, but felt he was underpaid. He was replaced by George Andrews.

The Rams were forced to trade Brudzinski and did so in the spring of 1981. The Rams received multiple picks and the top pick was used to draft future star linebacker Jim Collins. With the Rams Brudzinski totaled 242 tackles, 9 sacks, and over 20 passes broken up in his 55 games (41 starts) with the Rams.

== Miami Dolphins ==
Brudzinski played 125 games with 94 starts for Don Shula's Dolphins from 1981 though 1989, recording 14 1/2 sacks to bring his career total to 23 1/2 to go with his nine interceptions.

Brudzinski adapted quickly to the Bill Arnsbarger-coached defense nicknamed the "Killer-Bs" which propelled the Dolphins to the 1981 playoffs and the 1982 Super Bowl as well as the 1984 Super Bowl.

While with Miami, Brudzinski was voted to the All-Time Dolphins team in the early 2000s. He was mentioned in articles that ask "Who is the best linebacker never to play in a Pro Bowl?" and Brudzinski's name often comes up since he played well for a long period of time and was never honored by a Pro Bowl selection, even after his stellar 1979 season.

== Bru's Room ==
Founder and owner of Bru's Room Sports Grill.
