= 1986 Miami Dolphins season =

21st season in franchise history

- Owner: Joe Robbie
- Head coach: Don Shula
- Home stadium: Miami Orange Bowl

Results
- Record: 8–8
- Division place: 3rd AFC East
- Playoffs: Did not qualify
- Pro Bowlers: 5: QB Dan Marino; C Dwight Stephenson; ILB John Offerdahl; WR Mark Clayton; G Roy Foster

The 1986 Miami Dolphins season was the team's 21st as a member of the National Football League (NFL). The Dolphins failed to improve upon their previous season's output of 12–4, winning only eight games. This was the first time in six seasons the team did not qualify for the playoffs and would mark the start of a four-season span of barren postseason chances. This was also the team's final season at the Orange Bowl before moving into their new stadium Joe Robbie Stadium the following season.

== Draft ==
1986 Miami Dolphins draft
Round	Pick	Player	Position	College	Notes
2	52	John Offerdahl *	Linebacker	Western Michigan	
3	81	T.J. Turner	Defensive end	Houston	
4	107	James Pruitt	Wide receiver	Cal State Fullerton	
5	136	Kevin Wyatt	Cornerback	Arkansas	
6	163	Brent Sowell	Defensive tackle	Alabama	
7	193	Larry Kolic	Linebacker	Ohio State	
8	218	John Stuart	Tackle	Texas	
9	247	Reyna Thompson *	Safety	Baylor	
10	274	Jeff Wickersham	Quarterback	LSU	
11	303	Arnold Franklin	Tight end	North Carolina	
12	329	Rickey Isom	Running back	NC State	
Made roster * Made at least one Pro Bowl during career

== Personnel ==
=== Staff ===
1986 Miami Dolphins staff
Front office: President – Joe Robbie; Executive vice president/general manager – Mike Robbie; Vice president – Don Shula; Director of player personnel – Chuck Connor; Director of pro scouting – Charley Winner; Head coaches: Head coach – Don Shula; Assistant head coach – David Shula; Offensive coaches: Quarterbacks/receivers – David Shula; Offensive backs – Carl Taseff; Tight ends – Mike Westhoff; Offensive line – John Sandusky	Defensive coaches: Defense – Chuck Studley; Defensive line – Dan Sekanovich; Linebackers – Bob Matheson; Defensive backs – Mel Phillips; Special teams coaches: Special teams – Mike Westhoff; Strength and conditioning: Strength and conditioning – Junior Wade

=== Roster ===
1986 Miami Dolphins roster
Quarterbacks (QB): 13 Dan Marino; 10 Don Strock; Running backs (RB): 34 Woody Bennett; 30 Ron Davenport; 33 Craig Ellis; 27 Lorenzo Hampton; 22 Tony Nathan; Wide receivers (WR): 83 Mark Clayton; 85 Mark Duper; 11 Jim Jensen; 89 Nat Moore; 82 James Pruitt; Tight ends (TE): 84 Bruce Hardy; 87 Dan Johnson	Offensive linemen (OL): 65 Jeff Dellenbach T/G; 61 Roy Foster G; 68 Greg Koch T; 66 Larry Lee G; 72 Ronnie Lee G; 57 Dwight Stephenson C; 76 Tom Toth T; Defensive linemen (DL): 73 Bob Baumhower NT; 75 Doug Betters DE; 71 Mike Charles NT; 99 George Little DE; 70 Brian Sochia NT; 95 T. J. Turner DE	Linebackers (LB): 51 Mark Brown OLB; 59 Bob Brudzinski OLB; 53 David Frye OLB; 90 Andy Hendel ILB; 94 Larry Kolic ILB; 56 John Offerdahl ILB; 91 Fred Robinson OLB; 50 Jackie Shipp ILB; Defensive backs (DB): 47 Glenn Blackwood SS; 43 Bud Brown FS; 32 Donald Brown CB; 49 William Judson CB; 40 Mike Kozlowski SS; 28 Don McNeal CB; 26 Donovan Rose FS; 19 Reyna Thompson CB; Special teams (ST): 7 Fuad Reveiz K; 4 Reggie Roby P	Reserve: 42 Lyle Blackwood S (IR); -- Charles Bowser LB (PUP); -- Steve Clark G (IR); 79 Jon Giesler T (IR); 55 Hugh Green LB (IR); 64 Mike Katolin C (IR); 44 Paul Lankford CB (IR); 80 Joe Rose TE (IR); 52 Robin Sendlein LB (IR); 18 Mike Smith CB (IR); Rookies in italics

== Schedule ==
Week	Date	Opponent	Result	Record	Venue	Attendance
1	September 7	at San Diego Chargers	**L** 28–50	0–1	Jack Murphy Stadium	57,726
2	September 14	**Indianapolis Colts**	**W** 30–10	1–1	Miami Orange Bowl	51,848
3	September 21	at **New York Jets**	**L** 45–51 (OT)	1–2	Giants Stadium	71,025
4	September 28	San Francisco 49ers	**L** 16–31	1–3	Miami Orange Bowl	70,264
5	October 5	at **New England Patriots**	**L** 7–34	1–4	Sullivan Stadium	60,689
6	October 12	**Buffalo Bills**	**W** 27–14	2–4	Miami Orange Bowl	49,467
7	October 19	Los Angeles Raiders	**L** 28–30	2–5	Miami Orange Bowl	53,421
8	October 26	at **Indianapolis Colts**	**W** 17–13	3–5	Hoosier Dome	58,350
9	November 2	Houston Oilers	**W** 28–7	4–5	Miami Orange Bowl	43,804
10	November 10	at Cleveland Browns	**L** 16–26	4–6	Cleveland Municipal Stadium	77,949
11	November 16	at **Buffalo Bills**	**W** 34–24	5–6	Rich Stadium	76,474
12	November 24	**New York Jets**	**W** 45–3	6–6	Miami Orange Bowl	70,206
13	November 30	Atlanta Falcons	**L** 14–20	6–7	Miami Orange Bowl	53,762
14	December 7	at New Orleans Saints	**W** 31–27	7–7	Louisiana Superdome	64,761
15	December 14	at Los Angeles Rams	**W** 37–31 (OT)	8–7	Anaheim Stadium	62,629
16	December 22	**New England Patriots**	**L** 27–34	8–8	Miami Orange Bowl	74,516
Note: Intra-division opponents are in **bold** text.

== Final roster ==
1986 Miami Dolphins roster
Quarterbacks (QB): 13 Dan Marino; 10 Don Strock; Running backs (RB): 34 Woody Bennett FB; 30 Ron Davenport FB; 33 Craig Ellis RB; 27 Lorenzo Hampton RB; 22 Tony Nathan RB; Wide receivers (WR): 83 Mark Clayton; 85 Mark Duper; 11 Jim Jensen; 89 Nat Moore; 82 James Pruitt; Tight ends (TE): 84 Bruce Hardy; 87 Dan Johnson	Offensive linemen (OL): 65 Jeff Dellenbach C/G; 61 Roy Foster G; 68 Greg Koch T; 63 Larry Lee G; 72 Ronnie Lee G/T; 57 Dwight Stephenson C; 76 Tom Toth G; Defensive linemen (DL): 73 Bob Baumhower NT; 75 Doug Betters DE; 71 Mike Charles NT; 99 George Little DE; 70 Brian Sochia DE; 95 T. J. Turner DE	Linebackers (LB): 51 Mark Brown ILB; 59 Bob Brudzinski OLB; 53 David Frye OLB; 90 Andy Hendel ILB; 94 Larry Kolic OLB; 56 John Offerdahl ILB; 90 Fred Robinson OLB; 50 Jackie Shipp ILB; Defensive backs (DB): 47 Glenn Blackwood SS; 43 Bud Brown SS; 32 Donald Brown CB; 49 William Judson CB; 40 Mike Kozlowski FS; 28 Don McNeal CB; 26 Donovan Rose S; 24 Reyna Thompson CB; Special teams (ST): 7 Fuad Reveiz K; 4 Reggie Roby P	Reserve: 42 Lyle Blackwood FS (IR); 53 Jay Brophy MLB (IR); 78 Jerome Foster NT (IR); 79 Jon Giesler T (IR); 74 Cleveland Green T (IR); 55 Hugh Green OLB (IR); 44 Paul Lankford CB (IR); 91 Mack Moore DE (IR); 18 Mike Smith DB (IR); Rookies in italics 45 active, 6 reserve, 0 practice squad

== Season summary ==
=== Week 1 at Chargers ===
Miami Dolphins (0–0) at San Diego Chargers (0–0)

Quarter	1	2	3	4	Total
Dolphins	0	14	7	7	28
Chargers	17	9	14	10	50

at Jack Murphy Stadium • San Diego, California

- Date: September 7
- Game time: 4:00 p.m. EDT
- Game weather: 68 °F (20 °C) • Wind 9 miles per hour (14 km/h; 7.8 kn)
- Game attendance: 57,726
- Referee: Dick Jorgensen
- TV announcers (NBC): Jay Randolph and Jimmy Cefalo
- Pro-Football-Reference.com, The Football Database

Game information

Dolphins

- Dan Marino
  23/36, 290 Yds, 3 TD
- Lorenzo Hampton
  6 Rush, 26 Yds
- Mark Clayton
  5 Rec, 143 Yds, 2 TD

Chargers

- Dan Fouts
  23/35, 293 Yds, 3 TD
- Lionel James
  10 Rush, 61 Yds
- Wes Chandler
  6 Rec, 78 Yds, TD

Scoring summary

Quarter	Time	Drive			Team	Scoring information	Score	
Quarter	Time	Plays	Yards	TOP	Team	Scoring information	MIA	SD
1	10:52				Chargers	Gary Anderson 18-yard touchdown reception from Dan Fouts, Rolf Benirschke kick good	0	7
1	2:17				Chargers	26-yard field goal by Rolf Benirschke	0	10
1	0:24				Chargers	Tim Spencer 17-yard touchdown run, Rolf Benirschke kick good	0	17
2	12:00				Dolphins	Mark Clayton 22-yard touchdown reception from Dan Marino, Fuad Reveiz kick good	7	17
2	4:02				Chargers	Buford McGee 4-yard touchdown run, Rolf Benirschke kick no good	7	23
2	2:19				Dolphins	Mark Clayton 49-yard touchdown reception from Dan Marino, Fuad Reveiz kick good	14	23
2	0:28				Chargers	36-yard field goal by Rolf Benirschke	14	26
3	9:22				Chargers	Wes Chandler 7-yard touchdown reception from Dan Fouts, Rolf Benirschke kick good	14	33
3	6:47				Dolphins	Nat Moore 6-yard touchdown reception from Dan Marino, Fuad Reveiz kick good	21	33
3	0:21				Chargers	Pete Holohan 17-yard touchdown reception from Dan Fouts, Rolf Benirschke kick good	21	40
4	14:15				Chargers	Buford McGee 4-yard touchdown run, Rolf Benirschke kick good	21	47
4	5:48				Chargers	36-yard field goal by Rolf Benirschke	21	50
4	0:58				Dolphins	Nat Moore 17-yard touchdown reception from Dan Marino, Fuad Reveiz kick good	28	50
"TOP" = time of possession. For other American football terms, see Glossary of American football.							28	50

=== Week 2 ===
Team	1	2	3	4	Total
Colts	7	3	0	0	10
• Dolphins	7	13	10	0	30

- Date: September 14
- Location: Orange Bowl
- Referee: Bob Frederic
- TV announcers (NBC): Marv Albert, Bob Griese

Scoring summary
Q1	10:57	IND	Bentley 1 yard run (Biasucci kick)	IND 7–0
Q1	0:18	MIA	Hampton 5 yard run (Reveiz kick)	Tie 7–7
Q2	7:40	MIA	Moore 4 yard pass from Marino (kick failed)	MIA 13–7
Q2	5:03	MIA	Pruitt 71 yard punt return (Reveiz kick)	MIA 20–7
Q2	0:22	IND	Biasucci 23 yard field goal	MIA 20–10
Q3	10:45	MIA	Hampton 21 yard run (Reveiz kick)	MIA 27–10
Q3	3:31	MIA	Reveiz 27 yard field goal	MIA 30–10

=== Week 3 at Jets ===
Week Three: Miami Dolphins (1–1) at New York Jets (1–1)

Quarter	1	2	3	4	OT	Total
Dolphins	7	14	17	7	0	45
Jets	3	28	0	14	6	51

at Giants Stadium, East Rutherford, New Jersey

- Date: September 21
- Game time: 1:00 p.m. EST
- Game weather: 69 °F (21 °C)
- Game attendance: 71,025
- Referee: Pat Haggerty
- TV announcers (NBC): Dick Enberg & Merlin Olsen
- Box Score, Box Score

Game information

First quarter

- NYJ – Pat Leahy 32-yard field goal, 4:29. Jets 3–0.
- MIA – James Pruitt 6-yard pass from Dan Marino (Fuad Reveiz kick), 2:36. Dolphins 7–3.

Second quarter

- NYJ – Johnny Hector 1-yard run (Pat Leahy kick), 12:09. Jets 10–7.
- NYJ – Johnny Hector 8-yard run (Pat Leahy kick), 10:00. Jets 17–7.
- MIA – Dan Johnson 1-yard pass from Dan Marino (Fuad Reveiz kick), 7:26. Jets 17–14.
- MIA – Mark Duper 13-yard pass from Dan Marino (Fuad Reveiz kick), 5:06. Dolphins 21–17.
- NYJ – Wesley Walker 65-yard pass from Ken O'Brien (Pat Leahy kick), 3:12. Jets 24–21.
- NYJ – Wesley Walker 50-yard pass from Ken O'Brien (Pat Leahy kick), 0:34. Jets 31–21.

Third quarter

- MIA – Mark Duper 46-yard pass from Dan Marino (Fuad Reveiz kick), 10:48. Jets 31–28.
- MIA – Fuad Reveiz 44-yard field goal, 7:12. Tie 31–31.
- MIA – Bruce Hardy 1-yard pass from Dan Marino (Fuad Reveiz kick), 4:12. Dolphins 38–31.

Fourth quarter

- NYJ – Dennis Bligen 7-yard run (Pat Leahy kick), 8:42. Tie 38–38.
- MIA – Mark Clayton 4-yard pass from Dan Marino (Fuad Reveiz kick), 2:56. Dolphins 45–38.
- NYJ – Wesley Walker 21-yard pass from Ken O'Brien (Pat Leahy kick), 0:00. Tie 45–45.

Overtime

- NYJ – Wesley Walker 43-yard pass from Ken O'Brien, 12:25. Jets 51–45.

Top passers

- MIA – Dan Marino – 30/50, 448 Yds, 6 TD, 2 INT
- NYJ – Ken O'Brien – 29/43, 479 Yds, 4 TD, INT

Top rushers

- MIA – Tony Nathan – 4 Rush, 36 Yds
- NYJ – Johnny Hector – 22 Rush, 82 Yds, 2 TD

Top receivers

- MIA – Mark Clayton – 8 Rec, 174 Yds, TD
- NYJ – Wesley Walker – 6 Rec, 194 Yds, 4 TD

The Jets-Dolphins rivalry reached an apex in this Week 3 matchup as Ken O'Brien and Dan Marino unleashed ten combined touchdowns, the last a 43-yard score to Wesley Walker and a 51–45 overtime win for the Jets.

=== Week 6 vs. Bills ===
Team	1	2	3	4	Total
Bills	7	0	0	7	14
• Dolphins	3	7	10	7	27

- Date: October 12
- Location: Miami Orange Bowl - Miami, Florida
- Game start: 1:00 PM EST
- Game attendance: 49,467
- Game weather: 83 °F (28.3 °C); wind 10 miles per hour (16 km/h; 8.7 kn)
- Referee: Fred Wyant
- TV announcers (NBC): Don Criqui and Bob Trumpy

=== Week 11 at Bills ===
Miami Dolphins (4-6) at Buffalo Bills (3-7)

Team	1	2	3	4	Total
• Dolphins	0	10	10	14	34
Bills	7	14	3	0	24

- Date: November 16
- Location: Rich Stadium Orchard Park, NY
- Game start: 1:00 PM EST
- Game attendance: 76,474
- Game weather: 36 °F (2.2 °C); wind 10 miles per hour (16 km/h; 8.7 kn) cloudy & light rain
- Referee: Bob Frederic
- TV announcers (NBC): Gary Gerould and John Hannah

== Standings ==
AFC East
	W	L	T	PCT	DIV	CONF	PF	PA	STK
^{(3)} New England Patriots	11	5	0	.688	7–1	8–4	412	307	W1
^{(4)} New York Jets	10	6	0	.625	6–2	8–4	364	386	L5
Miami Dolphins	8	8	0	.500	5–3	6–6	430	405	L1
Buffalo Bills	4	12	0	.250	1–7	3–11	287	348	L3
Indianapolis Colts	3	13	0	.188	1–7	2–10	229	400	W3
