= 1985 Miami Dolphins season =

20th season in franchise history

- Owner: Joe Robbie
- General manager: Mike Robbie
- Head coach: Don Shula
- Defensive coordinator: Chuck Studley
- Home stadium: Miami Orange Bowl

Results
- Record: 12–4
- Division place: 1st AFC East
- Playoffs: Won Divisional Playoffs (vs. Browns) 24–21; Lost AFC Championship (vs. Patriots) 14–31
- Pro Bowlers: 4 QB Dan Marino; WR Mark Clayton; G Roy Foster; C Dwight Stephenson

The 1985 Miami Dolphins season was the 20th season in franchise history. The club won their fourth consecutive AFC East championship and appeared in the AFC Championship Game. It was the first season since their undefeated 1972 season without offensive lineman Ed Newman.

Due to Dan Marino's offseason holdout, and an injury to receiver Mark Duper, the Dolphins were only 5–4 through Week 9, and in third place in the AFC East, behind the 7–2 Jets and 6–3 Patriots. Their 220 points scored through Week 9 were fifth in the league, and 85 points fewer, than in 1984 at the same point in the season.

The Dolphins righted the ship, however, and won their final seven games, including an upset of the then-undefeated Chicago Bears in a Week 13 Monday Night contest. This was the last time until 2021 that the Dolphins had won 7 games in a row. Miami won the division and defeated the AFC Central champion Cleveland Browns 24–21 in their first playoff game. Their season would end with a 31–14 home loss to division rival New England in the AFC Championship Game.

== Off-season ==
Quarterback Dan Marino, coming off a record-shattering 1984 season, held out through training camp. This, and an injury to wide receiver Mark Duper, got the Dolphins out to a slow start.

== Draft ==
1985 Miami Dolphins draft
Round	Pick	Player	Position	College	Notes
1	27	Lorenzo Hampton	Running back	Florida	
3	65	George Little	Defensive tackle	Iowa	
3	83	Alex Moyer	Linebacker	Northwestern	
4	91	Mike Smith	Cornerback	UTEP	
4	111	Jeff Dellenbach	Offensive tackle	Wisconsin	
6	145	George Shorthose	Wide receiver	Missouri	
6	167	Ron Davenport	Fullback	Louisville	
7	195	Fuad Reveiz *	Kicker	Tennessee	
8	223	Dan Sharp	Tight end	TCU	
9	251	Adam Hinds	Defensive back	Oklahoma State	
10	279	Mike Pendleton	Defensive back	Indiana	
11	307	Mike Jones	Running back	Tulane	
12	335	Ray Noble	Defensive back	California	
Made roster * Made at least one Pro Bowl during career

=== Undrafted free agents ===
1985 undrafted free agents of note
Player	Position	College
Ray Condren	Running back	Gettysburg
Robert Weir	Defensive end	SMU
Mike White	Center	Alabama

== Personnel ==
=== Staff / Coaches ===
1985 Miami Dolphins staff
Front office: Owner – Joe Robbie; General manager – Mike Robbie; Head coaches: Head coach – Don Shula; Offensive coaches: Quarterbacks – David Shula; Running backs – Carl Taseff; Wide receivers – David Shula; Offensive line – John Sandusky	Defensive coaches: Defensive coordinator – Chuck Studley; Defensive line – Mike Scarry; Linebackers – Bob Matheson; Secondary – Mel Phillips; Special teams coaches: Special teams – Tom Keane; Strength and conditioning: Strength and conditioning – Junior Wade

=== Roster ===
1985 Miami Dolphins roster
Quarterbacks (QB): 13 Dan Marino; 10 Don Strock; Running backs (RB): 34 Woody Bennett; 23 Joe Carter; 30 Ron Davenport; 27 Lorenzo Hampton; 22 Tony Nathan; 32 Tommy Vigorito; Wide receivers (WR): 83 Mark Clayton; 85 Mark Duper; 11 Jim Jensen; 89 Nat Moore; Tight ends (TE): 84 Bruce Hardy; 87 Dan Johnson; 80 Joe Rose	Offensive linemen (OL): 76 Steve Clark G; 65 Jeff Dellenbach T; 61 Roy Foster G; 79 Jon Giesler T; 74 Cleveland Green T; 63 Larry Lee G/C; 72 Ronnie Lee T/G; 57 Dwight Stephenson C; Defensive linemen (DL): 70 Bill Barnett NT; 75 Doug Betters DE; 58 Kim Bokamper DE; 71 Mike Charles NT; 99 George Little DE; 91 Mack Moore DE	Linebackers (LB): 51 Mark Brown ILB; 53 Jay Brophy ILB; 59 Bob Brudzinski OLB; 55 Hugh Green OLB; 54 Alex Moyer OLB; 52 Robin Sendlein OLB; 50 Jackie Shipp ILB; Defensive backs (DB): 47 Glenn Blackwood SS; 42 Lyle Blackwood FS; 43 Bud Brown FS; 49 William Judson CB; 44 Paul Lankford CB; 28 Don McNeal CB; 18 Mike Smith CB/S; Special teams (ST): 7 Fuad Reveiz K; 4 Reggie Roby P	Reserve: 73 Bob Baumhower NT (IR); 56 Charles Bowser LB (IR); 88 Vince Heflin WR (IR); 40 Mike Kozlowski S (IR); 64 Ed Newman G (IR); 42 Robert Sowell CB (IR); 60 Jeff Toews G (IR); Rookies in italics

== Regular season ==
=== Schedule ===
Week	Date	Opponent	Result	Record	Venue	Attendance
1	September 8	at Houston Oilers	**L** 23–26	0–1	Houston Astrodome	47,656
2	September 15	**Indianapolis Colts**	**W** 30–13	1–1	Miami Orange Bowl	53,693
3	September 22	Kansas City Chiefs	**W** 31–0	2–1	Miami Orange Bowl	69,791
4	September 29	at Denver Broncos	**W** 30–26	3–1	Mile High Stadium	73,614
5	October 6	Pittsburgh Steelers	**W** 24–20	4–1	Miami Orange Bowl	72,820
6	October 14	at **New York Jets**	**L** 7–23	4–2	Giants Stadium	73,807
7	October 20	Tampa Bay Buccaneers	**W** 41–38	5–2	Miami Orange Bowl	62,335
8	October 27	at Detroit Lions	**L** 21–31	5–3	Pontiac Silverdome	75,291
9	November 3	at **New England Patriots**	**L** 13–17	5–4	Sullivan Stadium	58,811
10	November 10	**New York Jets**	**W** 21–17	6–4	Miami Orange Bowl	73,965
11	November 17	at **Indianapolis Colts**	**W** 34–20	7–4	Hoosier Dome	59,666
12	November 24	at **Buffalo Bills**	**W** 23–14	8–4	Rich Stadium	50,474
13	December 2	Chicago Bears	**W** 38–24	9–4	Miami Orange Bowl	75,594
14	December 8	at Green Bay Packers	**W** 34–24	10–4	Lambeau Field	52,671
15	December 16	**New England Patriots**	**W** 30–27	11–4	Miami Orange Bowl	69,489
16	December 22	**Buffalo Bills**	**W** 28–0	12–4	Miami Orange Bowl	64,811
Note: Intra-division opponents are in **bold** text.

=== Week 13 ===
Chicago Bears (12–0) at Miami Dolphins (8–4)

Quarter	1	2	3	4	Total
Bears	7	3	14	0	**24**
Dolphins	10	21	7	0	**38**

at Orange Bowl • Miami, Florida

- Date: December 2
- Game time: 9:00 p.m. EST
- Game weather: 76 °F (24 °C) • Wind 8 mph (13 km/h)
- Referee: Gordon McCarter
- TV announcers (ABC): Frank Gifford, Joe Namath, OJ Simpson
- Pro-Football-Reference.com

Game information

Bears

- Steve Fuller
  11/21, 169 Yds, TD, 2 INT
- Walter Payton
  23 Rush, 121 Yds
- Willie Gault
  2 Rec, 79 Yds

Dolphins

- Dan Marino
  14/27, 270 Yds, 3 TD, INT
- Tony Nathan
  15 Rush, 74 Yds
- Mark Duper
  5 Rec, 107 Yds

Miami finished 12–4 in 1985 and, in an epic Monday Night Football showdown on December 2, 1985, handed the previously-undefeated Chicago Bears their only defeat of the season. Several members of the 1972 Dolphins were in attendance at the game.

Scoring summary

Quarter	Time	Drive			Team	Scoring information	Score	
Quarter	Time	Plays	Yards	TOP	Team	Scoring information	CHI	MIA
1					Dolphins	Moore 33-yard touchdown reception from Marino, Reveiz kick good	0	7
1					Bears	Fuller 1-yard touchdown run, Butler kick good	7	7
1					Dolphins	47-yard field goal by Reveiz	7	10
2					Dolphins	Davenport 1-yard touchdown run, Reveiz kick good	7	17
2					Bears	30-yard field goal by Butler	10	17
2					Dolphins	Davenport 1-yard touchdown run, Reveiz kick good	10	24
2					Dolphins	Moore 6-yard touchdown reception from Marino, Reveiz kick good	10	31
3					Bears	Fuller 1-yard touchdown run, Butler kick good	17	31
4					Dolphins	Clayton 42-yard touchdown reception from Marino, Reveiz kick good	17	38
4					Bears	Margerum 19-yard touchdown reception from Fuller, Butler kick good	24	38
"TOP" = time of possession. For other American football terms, see Glossary of American football.							24	38

After rallying from a 21–3 third quarter deficit in the divisional playoffs to beat the Cleveland Browns 24–21, many people were looking forward to a rematch with Chicago in Super Bowl XX. The Cinderella New England Patriots, the Dolphins' opponents in the AFC Championship, had different plans. New England forced six turnovers on the way to a 31–14 win – the Patriots' first in Miami since 1966. The Patriots had lost 18 games in a row at the Orange Bowl. In 1969, the Boston Patriots had beaten the Dolphins at Tampa Stadium.

=== Standings ===
AFC East
	W	L	T	PCT	DIV	CONF	PF	PA	STK
^{(2)} Miami Dolphins	12	4	0	.750	6–2	9–3	428	320	W7
^{(4)} New York Jets	11	5	0	.688	6–2	9–3	393	264	W1
^{(5)} New England Patriots	11	5	0	.688	6–2	8–4	362	290	W1
Indianapolis Colts	5	11	0	.313	1–7	2–10	320	386	W2
Buffalo Bills	2	14	0	.125	1–7	2–12	200	381	L6

=== Final roster ===
1985 Miami Dolphins roster
**Quarterbacks (QB)**: 13 Dan Marino; 10 Don Strock; **Running backs (RB)**: 34 Woody Bennett FB; 20 Joe Carter RB; 30 Ron Davenport FB; 27 Lorenzo Hampton RB; 22 Tony Nathan RB; 32 Tommy Vigorito RB; **Wide receivers (WR)**: 83 Mark Clayton; 85 Mark Duper; 11 Jim Jensen; 89 Nat Moore; **Tight ends (TE)**: 84 Bruce Hardy; 87 Dan Johnson; 80 Joe Rose	**Offensive linemen (OL)**: 76 Steve Clark G; 65 Jeff Dellenbach C/G; 61 Roy Foster G; 79 Jon Giesler T; 74 Cleveland Green T; 63 Larry Lee G; 72 Ronnie Lee G/T; 57 Dwight Stephenson C; **Defensive linemen (DL)**: 75 Doug Betters DE; 58 Kim Bokamper DE; 71 Mike Charles NT; 99 George Little DE; 71 Mike Charles DE	**Linebackers (LB)**: 53 Jay Brophy MLB; 51 Mark Brown ILB; 59 Bob Brudzinski OLB; 55 Hugh Green OLB; 54 Alex Moyer OLB; 52 Robin Sendlein ILB; 50 Jackie Shipp ILB; **Defensive backs (DB)**: 47 Glenn Blackwood SS; 42 Lyle Blackwood FS; 43 Bud Brown SS; 49 William Judson CB; 40 Mike Kozlowski FS; 44 Paul Lankford CB; 28 Don McNeal CB; 18 Mike Smith DB; **Special teams (ST)**: 7 Fuad Reveiz K; 4 Reggie Roby P	**Reserve**: 70 Bill Barnett DE (IR); 73 Bob Baumhower NT (IR); 56 Charles Bowser OLB (IR); 82 Duriel Harris WR (IR); 64 Ed Newman G (IR); 60 Jeff Toews C (IR); Rookies in italics 45 active, 6 reserve, 0 practice squad

=== Player stats ===
==== Passing ====
**Player**	**Att**	**Comp**	**Yds**	**TD**	**Int**	**Rating**
Dan Marino	567	336	4137	30	21	84.1

== Playoffs ==
=== Schedule ===
Round	Date	Opponent	Result	Venue	Attendance
Divisional	January 4	Cleveland Browns	W 24–21	Miami Orange Bowl	75,128
AFC Championship Game	January 12	New England Patriots	L 14–31	Miami Orange Bowl	74,978

=== AFC divisional playoff ===
Miami Dolphins 24, Cleveland Browns 21

Quarter	1	2	3	4	Total
Browns	7	7	7	0	21
Dolphins	3	0	14	7	24

at Miami Orange Bowl, Miami, Florida

- Game time: 12:30 p.m. EST
- Game weather: 77 °F (25 °C), mostly cloudy
- Game attendance: 75,128
- Referee: Pat Haggerty
- TV announcers (NBC): Don Criqui and Bob Trumpy

The game is known as 'Marino's 18-point comeback.'

=== AFC Championship Game ===
New England Patriots 31, Miami Dolphins 14

Quarter	1	2	3	4	Total
Patriots	3	14	7	7	31
Dolphins	0	7	0	7	14

at Miami Orange Bowl, Miami, Florida

- Game time: 4:00 p.m. EST
- Game weather: 65 °F (18 °C), rain
- Game attendance: 74,978
- Referee: Gene Barth
- TV announcers (NBC): Dick Enberg and Merlin Olsen

In an upset, the Patriots converted 6 Dolphins turnovers into 24 points.

== Awards and honors ==
- Dan Marino, 1985 1st Team All-Pro and AFC Pro Bowl selection
- Mark Duper, franchise record, most receiving yards in one game, 217 yards on November 10.
