= 1984 Big Ten Conference football season =

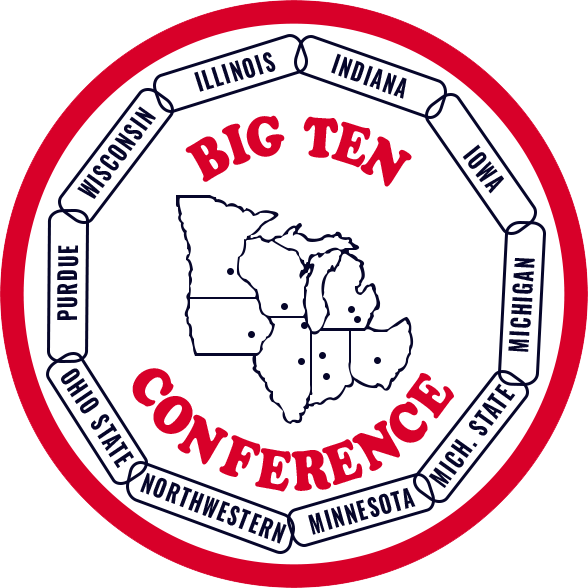
- Sport: American football
- Teams: 10
- TV partner(s): ABC, CBS, PASS, SportsVision
- Top draft pick: Kevin Allen
- Champion: Ohio State
- Runners-up: Illinois, Purdue
- Season MVP: Keith Byars

Seasons

1984 Big Ten Conference football standings
	Conf.					Overall
Team	W		L		T	W		L		T
No. 13 Ohio State $	7	–	2	–	0	9	–	3	–	0
Illinois	6	–	3	–	0	7	–	4	–	0
Purdue	6	–	3	–	0	7	–	5	–	0
No. 16 Iowa	5	–	3	–	1	8	–	4	–	1
Wisconsin	5	–	3	–	1	7	–	4	–	1
Michigan State	5	–	4	–	0	6	–	6	–	0
Michigan	5	–	4	–	0	6	–	6	–	0
Minnesota	3	–	6	–	0	4	–	7	–	0
Northwestern	2	–	7	–	0	2	–	9	–	0
Indiana	0	–	9	–	0	0	–	11	–	0
$ – Conference champion; Rankings from AP Poll

The 1984 Big Ten Conference football season was the 89th season of college football played by the member schools of the Big Ten Conference and was a part of the 1984 NCAA Division I-A football season.

The 1984 Ohio State Buckeyes football team, under head coach Earle Bruce, compiled a 9–3 record, won the Big Ten championship, led the conference in scoring offense (32.6 points per game), lost the 1985 Rose Bowl to USC, and was ranked No. 13 in the final AP poll. Running back Keith Byars set a Big Ten record with 1,764 rushing yards, won the Chicago Tribune Silver Football as the Big Ten's most valuable player, was selected as a consensus All-American, and finished second in the Heisman Trophy voting. Offensive guard Jim Lachey was also selected as a consensus All-American.

The 1984 Iowa Hawkeyes football team, under head coach Hayden Fry, compiled an 8–4–1 record, led the conference in scoring defense (15.5 points allowed per game), defeated Texas in the 1984 Freedom Bowl, and was ranked No. 15 in the final UPI poll. Linebacker Larry Station was a consensus All-American. Chuck Long was the first-team All-Big Ten quarterback and led the conference with a 156.4 passing efficiency rating, and Ronnie Harmon was a first-team All-Big Ten running back.

The 1984 Illinois Fighting Illini football team, under head coach Mike White, compiled a 7–3 record and finished in a tie for second place in the Big Ten. Wide receiver David Williams set Big Ten records with 101 receptions and 1,278 receiving yards and was a consensus All-American.

The 1984 Purdue Boilermakers football team compiled a 7–5 record, tied with Illinois for second place in the Big Ten, and lost to Virginia in the 1984 Peach Bowl. Leon Burtnett was named Big Ten Coach of the Year, and quarterback Jim Everett led the conference with 3,256 passing yards.

Six Big Ten teams played in bowl games, compiling a 1–5 record in those games.

This was the last of three consecutive seasons in which all teams played a full round-robin schedule. All teams except Iowa and Ohio State also played nine-game conference schedules in 1981.

== Season overview ==
=== Results and team statistics ===
Conf. Rank	Team	Head coach	AP final	AP high	Overall record	Conf. record	PPG	PAG	MVP
1	Ohio State	Earle Bruce	#13	#2	9–3	7–2	**32.6**	16.7	**Keith Byars**
2 (tie)	Illinois	Mike White	NR	NR	7–3	6–3	29.4	19.0	David Williams
2 (tie)	Purdue	Leon Burtnett	NR	#14	7–5	6–3	23.8	23.6	Jim Everett
4 (tie)	Iowa	Bob Commings	#16	#5	8–4–1	5–3–1	27.6	**15.5**	Ronnie Harmon
4 (tie)	Wisconsin	Dave McClain	NR	#20	7–4–1	5–3–1	20.2	17.2	Al Toon
6 (tie)	Michigan	Bo Schembechler	NR	#3	6–6	5–4	17.8	16.7	Mike Mallory
6 (tie)	Michigan State	George Perles	NR	NR	6–6	5–4	16.1	16.9	James Morrissey
8	Minnesota	Lou Holtz	NR	NR	4–7	3–6	17.6	28.7	Rickey Foggie
9	Northwestern	Dennis Green	NR	NR	2–9	2–7	12.5	31.7	Keith Cruise
10	Indiana	Bill Mallory	NR	NR	0–11	0–9	16.8	30.7	Joe Fitzgerald

Key
AP final = Team's rank in the final AP Poll of the 1984 season
AP high = Team's highest rank in the AP Poll throughout the 1984 season
PPG = Average of points scored per game; conference leader's average displayed in bold
PAG = Average of points allowed per game; conference leader's average displayed in bold
MVP = Most valuable player as voted by players on each team as part of the voting process to determine the winner of the Chicago Tribune Silver Football trophy; trophy winner in bold

=== Regular season ===
==== September 1 ====
On September 1, 1984, the Big Ten football season began with a single conference game.

- Illinois 24, Northwestern 16. In the annual Illinois–Northwestern football rivalry game, Illinois defeated Northwestern, 24–16, before a crowd of 75,753 at Memorial Stadium in Champaign, Illinois. Illinois quarterback Jack Trudeau completed 24 of 39 passes for 315 yards. Illinois split end David Williams had 11 receptions for a school record 208 yards.

==== September 8 ====
On September 8, 1984, the Big Ten football teams played 10 non-conference games, resulting in eight wins and two losses.

- Michigan 22, Miami (FL) 14. Michigan (ranked No. 14 in the AP poll) upset Miami (FL) (ranked No. 1), 22–14, before a crowd of 105,403 at Michigan Stadium in Ann Arbor, Michigan. Michigan's defense intercepted six Bernie Kosar passes and forced two fumbles. Michigan fullback Bob Perryman scored three touchdowns. Jim Harbaugh started his first game for Michigan.
- Ohio State 22, Oregon State 14. Ohio State (ranked No. 6 in the AP poll) defeated Oregon State, 22–14, before a crowd of 88,072 at Ohio Stadium in Columbus, Ohio. Oregon State led, 14-3, at halftime, but Ohio State scored 19 unanswered points in the second half. Keith Byars rushed for 182 yards and two touchdowns.
- Iowa 59, Iowa State 21. In the annual battle for the Cy-Hawk Trophy, Iowa (ranked No. 10 in the AP poll) defeated Iowa State, 59–21, before a crowd of 66,150 at Kinnick Stadium in Iowa City. Chuck Long completed 10 of 17 passes for 217 yards and four touchdowns. Running back Ronnie Harmon scored on 68-yard pass play and again on an 86-yard touchdown run.
- Purdue 23, Notre Dame 21. In the annual Notre Dame–Purdue football rivalry game, unranked Purdue defeated Notre Dame (ranked No. 8 in the AP poll), 23–21, before a crowd of 60,672 at the Hoosier Dome in Indianapolis. Purdue quarterback Jim Everett completed 20 of 28 passes for 255 yards and two touchdowns, and Mike Rendina kicked three field goals. Notre Dame turned the ball over five times.
- Illinois 30, Missouri 24. Illinois defeated Missouri, 30–24, before a record crowd of 78,297 in heavy rain at Memorial Stadium in Champaign. Illinois led, 30-17, with two minutes remaining, but Missouri quarterback Marlon Adler threw a 40-yard touchdown pass to George Shorthouse with 1:46 remaining. Missouri's ensuing onside kick failed, but Illinois back Eric Wycoff fumbled two plays later, and Missouri recovered the ball. With 16 seconds left and the ball on the Illinois 23-yard line, Guy Teatfiller sacked Adler, and the clock ran out.
- Wisconsin 27, Northern Illinois 14.
- Michigan State 24, Colorado 21.
- Minnesota 31, Rice 24.
- Washington 26, Northwestern 0.
- Duke 31, Indiana 24.

==== September 15 ====
On September 15, 1984, the Big Ten teams played 10 non-conference games, resulting in two wins and eight losses.

- Washington 20, Michigan 11. Michigan (ranked No. 3 in the AP poll) lost to Washington (ranked No. 16), 20–11, before a crowd of 103,072 at Michigan Stadium in Ann Arbor. Jim Harbaugh completed 17 of 37 passes and threw three interceptions. Michigan also fumbled three times with the Huskies recovering twice. Michigan trailed, 20-3, at the end of the third quarter and did not score a touchdown until the final two seconds of the game.
- Penn State 20, Iowa 17. Iowa (ranked No. 5 in the AP poll) lost to Penn State (ranked No. 12), 20–17, before a crowd of 66,145 at Kinnick Stadium in Iowa City. Iowa lost three fumbles, two by the punter. With less than two minutes left in the game, Iowa drove to the Penn State 29-yard line. On fourth-and-one, Ronnie Harmon was stopped by the Penn State defense.
- Ohio State 44, Washington State 0. Ohio State (ranked No. 9 in the AP poll) defeated Washington State, 44–0, before a crowd of 89,297 at Ohio Stadium in Columbus. Keith Byars totaled 145 rushing yards and 47 receiving yards and scored two touchdowns. The game was Ohio State's first shutout since 1980.
- Stanford 34, Illinois 19.
- Miami (FL) 28, Purdue 17.
- Wisconsin 35, Missouri 34.
- Notre Dame 24, Michigan State 20.
- Nebraska 38, Minnesota 7.
- Syracuse 13, Northwestern 12.
- Kentucky 48, Indiana 14.

==== September 22 ====
On September 22, 1984, the Big Ten teams played five conference games.

- Ohio State 45, Iowa 26.
- Illinois 40, Michigan State 7.
- Purdue 34, Minnesota 10.
- Michigan 20, Wisconsin 14.
- Northwestern 40, Indiana 37.

==== September 29 ====
On September 29, 1984, the Big Ten teams played five conference games.

- Ohio State 35, Minnesota 22.
- Iowa 21, Illinois 16.
- Purdue 13, Michigan State 10.
- Wisconsin 31, Northwestern 16.
- Michigan 14, Indiana 6.

==== October 6 ====
On October 6, 1984, the Big Ten teams played five conference games.

- Purdue 28, Ohio State 23.
- Iowa 31, Northwestern 3.
- Illinois 22, Wisconsin 6.
- Michigan State 19, Michigan 7.
- Minnesota 33, Indiana 24.

==== October 13 ====
On October 13, 1984, the Big Ten teams played five conference games.

- Ohio State 45, Illinois 38.
- Iowa 40, Purdue 3.
- Minnesota 17, Wisconsin 14.
- Michigan 31, Northwestern 0.
- Michigan State 13, Indiana 6.

==== October 20 ====
On October 20, 1984, the Big Ten football teams played five conference games.

- Ohio State 23, Michigan State 20.
- Iowa 26, Michigan 0.
- Illinois 34, Purdue 20.
- Wisconsin 20, Indiana 16.
- Northwestern 31, Minnesota 28.

==== October 27 ====
On October 27, 1984, the Big Ten teams played five conference games.

- Wisconsin 16, Ohio State 14.
- Iowa 24, Indiana 20.
- Michigan 26, Illinois 18.
- Purdue 49, Northwestern 7.
- Michigan State 20, Minnesota 13.

==== November 3 ====
On November 3, 1984, the Big Ten football teams played five conference games.

- Ohio State 50, Indiana 7.
- Iowa 10, Wisconsin 10.
- Illinois 48, Minnesota 3.
- Purdue 31, Michigan 29.
- Michigan State 27, Northwestern 10.

==== November 10 ====
On November 10, 1984, the Big Ten teams played five conference games.

- Ohio State 52, Northwestern 3.
- Michigan State 17, Iowa 16.
- Illinois 34, Indiana 7.
- Wisconsin 30, Purdue 13.
- Michigan 31, Minnesota 7.

==== November 17 ====
On November 17, 1984, the Big Ten teams played four conference games. Illinois and Northwestern did not play.

- Ohio State 21, Michigan 6. Ohio State (ranked No. 11 in the AP Poll) defeated Michigan, 21–6, before a crowd of 90,286 at Ohio Stadium in Columbus, Ohio.
- Minnesota 23, Iowa 17.
- Purdue 31, Indiana 24.
- Wisconsin 20, Michigan State 10.

==== December 1 ====
On December 1, 1984, the Big Ten's regular season came to an end with a single non-conference game.

- Iowa 17, Hawaii 6. Iowa defeated Hawaii, 17–6, before a crowd of 50,000 at Aloha Stadium in Honolulu.

=== Bowl games ===
Six of ten Big Ten football teams participated in post-season bowl games.

==== 1985 Rose Bowl ====
On January 1, 1985, Ohio State (ranked No. 6 in the AP poll) lost to USC (ranked No. 18), 20-17, before a crowd of 102,594 in the 1985 Rose Bowl at the Rose Bowl in Pasadena, California. Ohio State quarterback Mike Tomczak threw three interceptions.

==== 1984 Peach Bowl ====
On December 31, 1984, Purdue lost to Virginia, 27-24, before a crowd of 41,107 in the 1984 Peach Bowl at Atlanta–Fulton County Stadium in Atlanta. Purdue quarterback Jim Everett passed for 253 yards and three touchdowns, but the Boilermakers gained just 75 yards rushing and committed four turnovers in their first bowl loss.

==== 1984 Hall of Fame Classic ====
On December 29, 1984, Wisconsin lost to Kentucky, 20-19, before a crowd of 47,300 in the 1984 Hall of Fame Classic at Legion Field in Birmingham, Alabama.

==== 1984 Freedom Bowl ====
On December 26, 1984, Iowa defeated Texas (ranked No. 19 in the AP poll), 55–17, in the 1984 Freedom Bowl at Anaheim Stadium in Anaheim, California.

==== 1984 Cherry Bowl ====
On December 22, 1984, Michigan State lost to Army, 10–6, before a crowd of 70,336 at the Silverdome in Pontiac, Michigan.

==== 1984 Holiday Bowl ====
On December 21, 1984, Michigan lost to BYU (ranked No. 1 in the AP and UPI polls), 24-17, before a crowd of 61,248 at Jack Murphy Stadium in San Diego. Robbie Bosco, playing with an injured leg, led BYU's winning touchdown drive in the final quarter, ending with a touchdown pass from Bosco to Kelly Smith with 1:23 remaining. After the bowl season, BYU was recognized as the 1984 consensus national champion.

== Statistical leaders ==
The Big Ten's individual statistical leaders include the following:

=== Passing yards ===
1. Jim Everett, Purdue (3,256)
2. Chuck Long, Iowa (2,871)
3. Jack Trudeau, Illinois (2,724)
4. Steve Bradley, Indiana (2,544)
5. Mike Howard, Wisconsin (2,127)

=== Rushing yards ===
1. Keith Byars, Ohio State (1,764)
2. Thomas Rooks, Illinois (1,056)
3. Owen Gill, Iowa (920)
4. Ronnie Harmon, Iowa (907)
5. Marck Harrison, Wisconsin (848)

=== Receiving yards ===
1. David Williams, Illinois (1,278)
2. Steve Griffin, Purdue (1,060)
3. Len Kenebrew, Indiana (750)
3. Al Toon, Wisconsin (750)
5. Randy Grant, Illinois (680)

=== Total offense ===
1. Jim Everett, Purdue (3,207)
2. Jack Trudeau, Illinois (2,797)
3. Chuck Long, Iowa (2,717)
4. Steve Bradley, Indiana (2,561)
5. Mike Howard, Wisconsin (2,138)

=== Passing efficiency rating ===
1. Chuck Long, Iowa (156.4)
2. Jack Trudeau, Illinois (136.3)
3. Mike Tomczak, Ohio State (131.1)
4. Jim Everett, Purdue (127.6)
5. Mike Howard, Wisconsin (118.8)

=== Rushing yards per attempt ===
1. Larry Emery, Wisconsin (6.2)
2. John Wooldridge, Ohio State (5.9)
3. Keith Byars, Ohio State (5.2)
4. Bob Perryman, Michigan (5.2)
5. Casey Cummings, Northwestern (4.9)

=== Yards per reception ===
1. Dwayne McMullen, Minnesota (22.8)
2. Len Kenebrew, Indiana (18.3)
3. Randy Grant, Illinois (16.6)
4. Steve Griffin, Purdue (16.6)
5. Rick Brunner, Purdue (15.9)

=== Points scored ===
1. Keith Byars, Ohio State (144)
2. Chris White, Illinois (103)
3. Tom Nichol, Iowa (89)
4. Rich Spangler, Ohio State (87)
5. Todd Gregoire, Wisconsin (84)

== Awards and honors ==
=== All-Big Ten honors ===
The following players were picked by the Associated Press (AP) and/or the United Press International (UPI) as first-team players on the 1984 All-Big Ten Conference football team.

Offense

Position	Name	Team	Selectors
Quarterback	Chuck Long	Iowa	AP, UPI
Running back	Keith Byars	Ohio State	AP, UPI
Running back	Ronnie Harmon	Iowa	AP, UPI
Running back	Thomas Rooks	Illinois	UPI
Center	Kirk Lowdermilk	Ohio State	AP, UPI
Guard	Chris Babyar	Illinois	AP, UPI
Guard	Jim Lachey	Ohio State	AP, UPI
Tackle	Jeff Dellenbach	Wisconsin	AP, UPI
Tackle	Jim Juriga	Illinois	AP
Tackle	Mark Krerowicz	Ohio State	UPI
Tight end	Cap Boso	Illinois	AP
Receiver	Al Toon	Wisconsin	AP, UPI
Receiver	David Williams	Illinois	AP, UPI

Defense

Position	Name	Team	Selectors
Defensive line	Keith Cruise	Northwestern	AP, UPI
Defensive line	Paul Hufford	Iowa	AP, UPI
Defensive line	George Little	Iowa	AP, UPI
Defensive line	Kevin Brooks	Michigan	UPI
Defensive line	Darryl Sims	Wisconsin	AP
Linebacker	Pepper Johnson	Ohio State	AP, UPI
Linebacker	Mike Mallory	Michigan	AP, UPI
Linebacker	Larry Station	Iowa	AP, UPI
Linebacker	Jim Morrissey	Michigan State	UPI
Linebacker	Joe Fitzgerald	Indiana	AP
Defensive back	Mike Stoops	Iowa	AP, UPI
Defensive back	Rod Woodson	Purdue	AP
Defensive back	Devon Mitchell	Iowa	AP
Defensive back	Phil Parker	Michigan State	UPI
Defensive back	Richard Johnson	Wisconsin	UPI

=== All-American honors ===
At the end of the 1984 season, four Big Ten players were consensus first-team picks for the 1984 College Football All-America Team. The Big Ten's consensus All-Americans were:

Position	Name	Team	Selectors
Running back	Keith Byars	Ohio State	AFCA, AP, FWAA, UPI, WC, GNS, NEA, TSN
Receiver	David Williams	Illinois	AFCA, AP, FWAA, UPI, WCFF, GNS, NEA, TSN
Offensive guard	Jim Lachey	Ohio State	FWAA, UPI, GNS
Linebacker	Larry Station	Iowa	AFCA, AP, UPI, WCFF

Other Big Ten players who were named first-team All-Americans by at least one selector were:

Position	Name	Team	Selectors
Tight end	Jon Hayes	Iowa	GNS
Defensive back	Richard Johnson	Wisconsin	FWAA, NEA, TSN

=== Other awards ===
- Heisman Trophy voting: Ohio State running back Keith Byars (second); and Iowa quarterback Chuck Long (seventh)
- Big Ten Player of the Year: Keith Byars of Ohio State
- Big Ten Coach of the Year: Leon Burtnett of Purdue

== 1985 NFL draft ==
The 1985 NFL draft was held in New York on April 30 and May 1, 1985 in New York City, New York. The following players were among the first 100 picks:

Name	Position	Team	Round	Overall pick
Kevin Allen	Offensive tackle	Indiana	1	9
Al Toon	Wide Receiver	Wisconsin	1	10
Richard Johnson	Cornerback	Wisconsin	1	11
Jim Lachey	Offensive tackle	Ohio State	1	12
