= Ray Noble (disambiguation) =

Ray Noble is a musician and actor.

Ray Noble may also refer to:

- Ray Noble (baseball)
- Ray Noble (American football), see Ron Davenport
- Ray Noble (basketball), played in 1937 NCAA Men's Basketball All-Americans
