= 1984 All-Big Ten Conference football team =

American college football all-star team

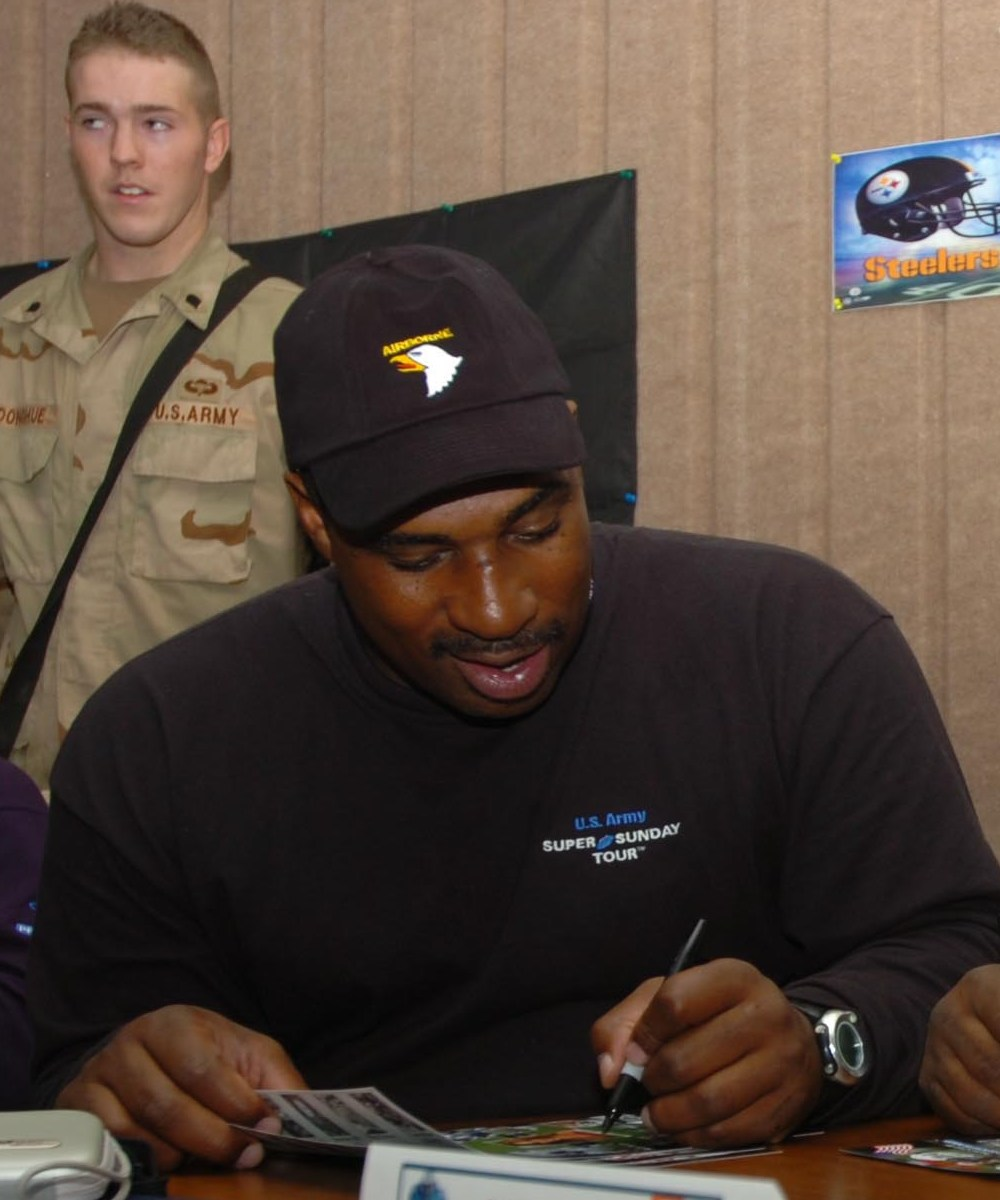
1984 Big Ten Player of the Year Keith Byars of Ohio State

The 1984 All-Big Ten Conference football team consists of American football players chosen as All-Big Ten Conference players for the 1984 Big Ten Conference football season. The organizations selecting All-Big Ten teams in 1987 included the Associated Press (AP) and the United Press International (UPI).

Ohio State running back Keith Byars, who led the country with 1,655 rushing yards and 144 points, was selected as the Big Ten Player of the Year. Byars and Illinois wide receiver David Williams, who led the country with 101 receptions for 1,278 yards, were unanimously selected as first-team All-Big Ten players by the AP. Those two, as well as Ohio State offensive lineman Jim Lachey and Iowa linebacker Larry Station, were also selected as consensus first-team All-Americans.

Other individual award winners included Wisconsin guard Jeff Dellenbach as the Big Ten Offensive Lineman of the Year, Iowa tackle Paul Hufford as the Big Ten Defensive Lineman of the Year, and Purdue's Leon Burtnett as the Big Ten Coach of the Year.

== First-team honorees by team ==
Iowa (7). The 1984 Iowa Hawkeyes football team under head coach Hayden Fry led all other teams with seven first-team All-Big Ten selections. The Iowa contingent was anchored by quarterback Chuck Long who led the conference with 22 passing touchdowns and a 156.4 passing efficiency rating. Iowa's other first-team honorees were running back Ronnie Harmon (1,225 yards for scrimmage and 11 touchdowns), linebacker Larry Station, defensive linemen Paul Hufford and George Little, defensive backs Mike Stoops and Devon Mitchell.

Ohio State (6). The 1984 Ohio State team under head coach Earle Bruce won the Big Ten championship and placed six first-team players on the All-Big Ten team. In addition to Big Ten Player of the Year Keith Byars, the other Ohio State honorees were linebacker Pepper Johnson, punter Tom Tupa, and offensive linemen Kirk Lowdermilk, Jim Lachey and Mark Krerowicz.

Illinois (6). The Illinois Fighting Illini under head coach Mike White also had six players who received first-team honors. The Illini players receiving first-team honors were running back Thomas Rooks (1,056 rushing yards), wide receiver David Williams (101 receptions for 1,278 yards), tight end Cap Boso, and kicker Chris White. Illinois quarterback Jack Trudeau received second-team honors and was third in the conference with 2,724 passing yards.

Wisconsin (4). The 1984 Wisconsin Badgers football team under head coach Dave McClain placed four players on the all-conference first team. The Wisconsin honorees were Offensive Lineman of the Year Jeff Dellenbach, receiver Al Toon (54 receptions for 750 yards), defensive lineman Darryl Sims, and defensive back Richard Johnson. Wisconsin running back Larry Emery was a second-team honoree and led the conference with an average of 6.2 yards per rushing attempt.

== Offensive selections ==
=== Quarterbacks ===
- Chuck Long, Iowa (AP-1; UPI-1)
- Jack Trudeau, Illinois (AP-2; UPI-2)

=== Running backs ===
- Keith Byars, Ohio State (AP-1; UPI-1)
- Ronnie Harmon, Iowa (AP-1; UPI-1)
- Thomas Rooks, Illinois (AP-2; UPI-1)
- Larry Emery, Wisconsin (AP-2; UPI-2)
- Carl Butler, Michigan State (UPI-2)
- Owen Gill, Iowa (UPI-2)

=== Centers ===
- Kirk Lowdermilk, Ohio State (AP-1; UPI-1)
- Mark Napolitan, Michigan State (AP-2)
- Dan Turk, Wisconsin (UPI-2)

=== Guards ===
- Chris Babyar, Illinois (AP-1; UPI-1)
- Jim Lachey, Ohio State (AP-1; UPI-1)
- Doug James, Michigan (AP-2; UPI-2)
- Scott Zalenski, Ohio State (AP-2; UPI-2)

=== Tackles ===
- Jeff Dellenbach, Wisconsin (AP-1; UPI-1)
- Jim Juriga, Illinois (AP-1; UPI-2)
- Mark Krerowicz, Ohio State (AP-2; UPI-1)
- Mike Haight, Iowa (AP-2)
- Kevin Allen, Indiana (UPI-2)

=== Tight ends ===
- Cap Boso, Illinois (AP-1; UPI-2 [receiver])
- Sim Nelson, Michigan (AP-2)

=== Receivers ===
- Al Toon, Wisconsin (AP-1; UPI-1)
- David Williams, Illinois (AP-1; UPI-1)
- Steve Griffin, Purdue (AP-2; UPI-2)
- Jon Hayes, Iowa (UPI-2)
- Len Kenebrew, Indiana (AP-2)

== Defensive selections ==
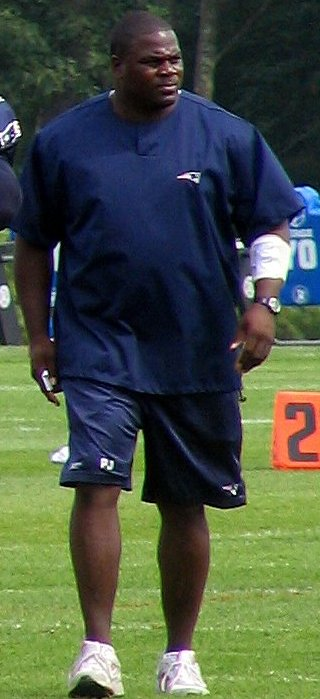
Ohio State linebacker Pepper Johnson

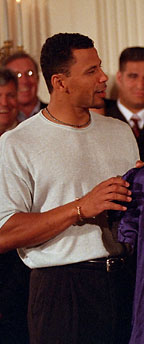
Purdue defensive back Rod Woodson

=== Defensive linemen ===
- Keith Cruise, Northwestern (AP-1; UPI-1)
- Paul Hufford, Iowa (AP-1; UPI-1)
- George Little, Iowa (AP-1; UPI-1)
- Darryl Sims, Wisconsin (AP-1; UPI-2)
- Kevin Brooks, Michigan (UPI-1)
- Kelly Quinn, Michigan State (AP-2; UPI-2)
- Al Sincich, Michigan (AP-2; UPI-2)
- Brad Horner, Purdue (AP-2)
- Guy Teafatiller, Illinois (UPI-2)

=== Linebackers ===
- Pepper Johnson, Ohio State (AP-1; UPI-1)
- Mike Mallory, Michigan (AP-1; UPI-1)
- Larry Station, Iowa (AP-1; UPI-1)
- Jim Morrissey, Michigan State (AP-2; UPI-1)
- Joe Fitzgerald, Indiana (AP-1)
- Peter Najarian, Minnesota (AP-2; UPI-2)
- James Melka, Wisconsin (AP-2; UPI-2)
- Kevin Spitzig, Iowa (AP-2; UPI-2)
- Rod Lyles, Michigan (UPI-2)

=== Defensive backs ===
- Mike Stoops, Iowa (AP-1; UPI-1)
- Richard Johnson, Wisconsin (AP-2; UPI-1)
- Rod Woodson, Purdue (AP-1)
- Devon Mitchell, Iowa (AP-1)
- Phil Parker, Michigan State (UPI-1)
- Mike Heaven, Illinois (AP-2)
- Chris Sigler, Indiana (AP-2)
- Craig Swoope, Illinois (UPI-2)
- Brad Cochran, Michigan (UPI-2)
- Keith Hunter, Iowa (UPI-2)

== Special teams ==
=== Kickers ===
- Chris White, Illinois (AP-1; UPI-1)
- Ralf Mojsiejenko, Michigan State (AP-2; UPI-2)

=== Punters ===
- Tom Tupa, Ohio State (AP-1; UPI-1)
- Adam Kelly, Minnesota (AP-2)
- Ralf Mojsiejenko, Michigan State (UPI-2)

== Key ==
AP = Associated Press, selected by a panel of sportswriters and broadcasters covering the Big Ten

UPI = United Press International

Bold = Consensus first-team selection by both AP and UPI

== See also ==
- 1984 College Football All-America Team
