= Brittany Chrishawn Moore =

American producer

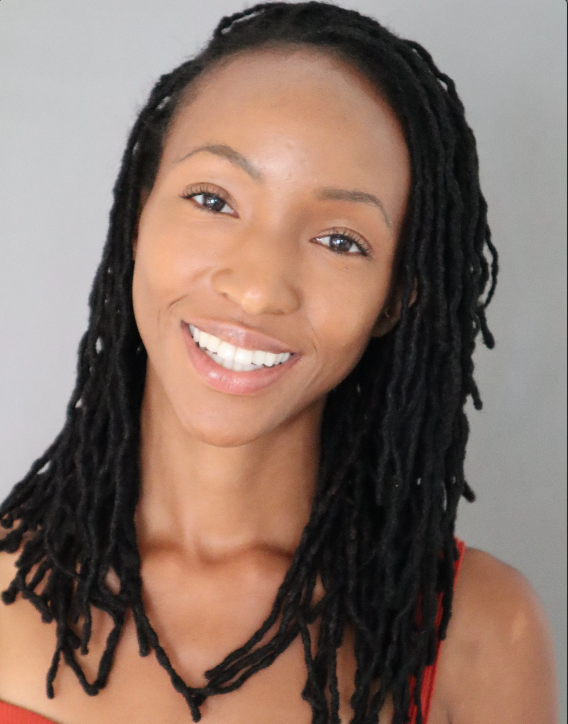

Brittany Chrishawn Moore (née Williams), better known as Brittany Chrishawn, is a Jamaican-American film producer, musical artist, and police brutality survivor who was brutalized by the Jacksonville Sheriff's Office (JSO) police after asking a trespassing officer to leave her property. She gained public support after the release and examination of body camera footage of her unjust arrest and mistreatment by five Jacksonville, Florida police officers.

== Early life and education ==
Brittany Chrishawn Moore attended high school at Paxon School for Advanced Studies in Jacksonville, Florida. Chrishawn later enrolled in the University of Central Florida in Orlando where she graduated with two honors degrees.

== Impact ==
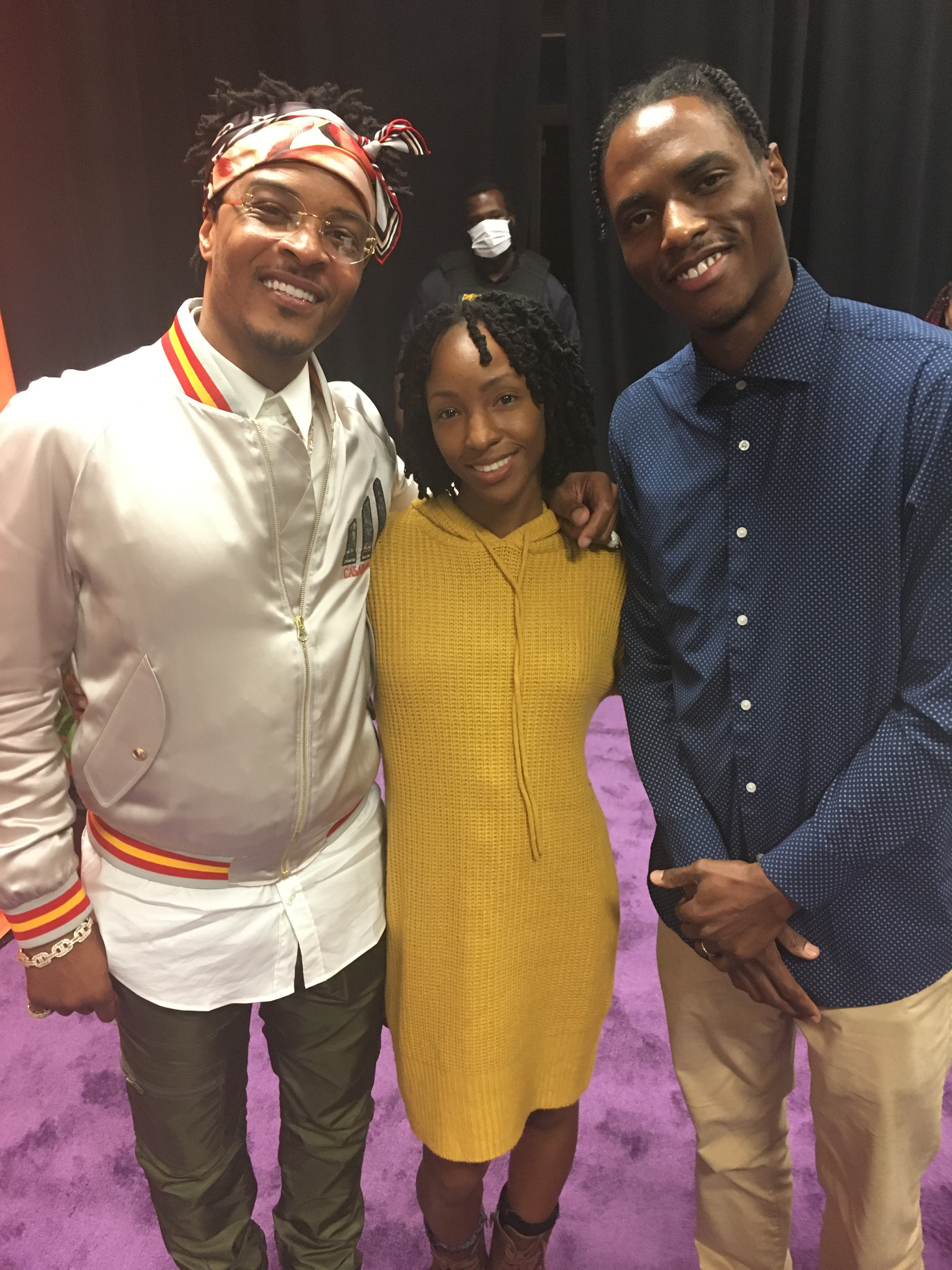
American Rapper T.I. with Brittany Chrishawn Moore and her husband Ausar Moore in Jacksonville, FL (October 2021)

Brittany Chrishawn's fight for her freedom and justice caught widespread attention to include prominent civil rights and social justice leaders. On December 18, 2020, Ben Crump tweeted, "Several @JSOPIO police officers LIED about their encounter with @brittchrishawn and arrested her on false charges. There is video evidence that Brittany DID NOT throw a spoon at an officer through his window, yet the officer insists that Brittany attacked him!!" American rapper T.I. and his not profit organization, Us or Else, also got involved by sharing posts on Instagram, incorporating the #SayHerName movement, and prompting the public to show their support and demand justice for Chrishawn. Chrishawn's Change.org petition is also shared on the "Petitions for Justice" page on the UsOrElse.org website.

== Activism and advocacy ==
Chrishawn utilizes film and media to promote social and political reform. She also speaks out publicly and motivates others to stand up for their rights.

=== Illville ===
Chrishawn co-wrote, produced, and appeared in Illville, a 2019 dramatic satire that explored the psychology behind police brutality months before her real-life drama with the police. The film won several screenplay and film festival awards, and in April 2020 it was scheduled to be screened in France at the Cannes International Pan African Film Festival. But the COVID-19 pandemic derailed those plans.

A month later, Chrishawn fell prey to some of the police violence depicted in her film. And her Change.org petition had gained roughly 75,000 signatures by December 2020.

=== Speaking out ===
Chrishawn speaks publicly against abuses of power, police brutality, and social injustice. In September 2020, she initiated the production of a documentary, aiming to chronicle her deeply personal journey following her significant police encounter. And when other women courageously shared their own experiences with her, she began to integrate their stories into a docuseries titled "Survival Stories."

In December 2020, she spoke out in the news for the first time against the officers that brutalized her in an interview with News4Jax. In 2021, she created the LMLM Network, a platform designed for women to share their experiences of enduring abuses perpetrated by male authority figures.

=== Arrest of Officer Alejandro Carmona-Fonseca ===
Officer Alejandro Carmona-Fonseca was arrested twice for child-solicitation and luring underaged boys on SnapChat.

Chrishawn's fight against JSO led to the release of Officer Alejandro Carmona-Fonseca's history of complaints which then led to his arrest. And it was confirmed that Officer Alejandro Carmona-Fonseca is the same officer that trespassed on Chrishawn's property on May 13, 2020.

March 15, 2022 was officer Carmona's first arrest. He was released on bail, but another minor came forward leading to his second arrest on April 22, 2022. A tip was sent to CCSO in February 2022 that Carmona met and befriended the victim at a gym in Clay County and began sending nude images from his smartphone over Snapchat.

On March 17, 2022, she tweeted "Why was he still on the streets after what he did to me?" (referring to officer Carmona-Fonseca). American politician Angie Nixon retweeted this adding, "After beating up a Black Woman and knocking her teeth out, in her own driveway because she asked him to leave, he's now under arrest after being caught in an underaged sex-trafficking sting".

The Florida Star printed on May 13, 2022: "Brittany Chrishawn Williams, now known as Brittany Chrishawn Moore, was the first to shed light on sexual misconduct by JSO officers. She released body camera footage in December 2020 that revealed JSO police officers exposing her breasts, joking about having sex with her and other civilians and using vulgar language to describe her body parts. Alejandro Carmona was included in these conversations as his supervisor is heard asking if Carmona was at Brittany Chrishawn Moore's residence to have sex with her."

On December, 15, 2022 it was reported that Officer Alejandro Carmona-Fonseca pleaded guilty to attempted online enticement of a minor to engage in sexual activity.

== Police brutality story ==
Chrishawn's police brutality survival preceded the murder of George Floyd (May 25, 2020) by 12 days. Her story grew in the news amidst the 2020 Black Lives Matter protests alongside George Floyd and Breonna Taylor and served as an addition to the 2020-2023 United States racial unrest. On May 13, 2020, JSO police trespassed and parked at a property owned by Chrishawn for no legal reason; they entered her home without a warrant, used excessive force, broke her teeth, and permanently damaged the nerves in her arm. The body camera video she released went viral, and she was found not guilty of battery on law enforcement on September 10, 2021.

"Attorneys say due to the excessive and unjustifiable force, she suffered a head injury, a neck contusion and two fractured teeth."

According to The Florida Times-Union, the contents of her video raised racial concerns about the Jacksonville Sheriff's Office's interactions with the public. This incident "comes in the wake of the South Georgia killing of Ahmaud Arbery by a former police officer, the Louisville police killing of Breonna Taylor and the Minneapolis police killing of George Floyd."

News4Jax reported on September 10, 2021, that she was arrested and charged with battery on a law enforcement officer and resisting arrest. After a two-day trial, the jury acquitted Williams on the assault charge but convicted her of resisting police without violence. She was sentenced to six months probation, ordered to undergo mental health evaluations and anger management, and she had to write a letter of apology to the officer that injured her.

News4Jax crime and safety expert Ken Jefferson reported, "The person arrested was well within her rights to ask the officer was he there for official business. We later learned he was there reading emails. She asked him to leave."

=== Not guilty ===
Official reports show that Chrishawn had no criminal record, no history of violence, and was no credible threat.

While one of the deputies present at the scene insisted that Chrishawn had "threatened to shoot the police", Jacksonville Sgt. J.R. O'Neal carefully examined the entirety of her altercation with the officers. After a comprehensive review, Sgt. O'Neal concluded that there was no "credible threat" warranting the issuance of a risk protection order (RPO). As an investigator within the Sheriff's Office's RPO unit, Sgt. O'Neal meticulously analyzed the 911 calls, dispatch notes, radio transmissions, and footage from three deputies' body-worn cameras. His thorough investigation revealed no recent history of violence, substance abuse, or mental illness in Chrishawn's background.

Following her arrest, deputies contemplated seeking a RPO, which could have restricted her from owning or possessing firearms for up to a year. The RPO is a provision of a gun safety bill that was swiftly enacted by Florida lawmakers after the tragic mass shooting at Marjory Stoneman Douglas High School in February 2018, which claimed the lives of 17 individuals. RPOs, also referred to as "red flag laws", are commonly utilized to disarm individuals with recurring mental health issues or deemed dangerous, who may pose a risk of violence to themselves or others, particularly mentally ill gun owners.

According to the RPO report for Chrishawn, it was definitively established that she never made any threats to use or display her firearm during her recorded interaction with officers. While she armed herself for self-protection within her residence, there were no indications of any direct threats to shoot the officers, and she refrained from brandishing the weapon when she engaged with deputies on her front porch during the argument.

She was facing up to 10 years in prison for felony battery on a law enforcement officer and has been found not guilty after Jacksonville Police broke her teeth during her arrest.
