= Ryan Lankford =

American gridiron football player (born 1991)

No. 84, 85
- Position: Wide receiver / Return specialist

Personal information
- Born: December 9, 1991 (age 34); Jacksonville, Florida, U.S.
- Listed height: 5 ft 11 in (1.80 m)
- Listed weight: 176 lb (80 kg)

Career information
- High school: Jacksonville (FL) Paxon
- College: Illinois
- NFL draft: 2014: undrafted

Career history
- Miami Dolphins (2014)*; Indianapolis Colts (2014–2015)*; Saskatchewan Roughriders (2015–2016); Winnipeg Blue Bombers (2017–2018); Ottawa Redblacks (2019); BC Lions (2019)
- * Offseason or practice squad member only
- Stats at Pro Football Reference
- Stats at CFL.ca

Ryan Lankford (born December 9, 1991) is an American former professional football wide receiver. He played college football for Illinois and signed with the Miami Dolphins as an undrafted free agent in 2014. He has been a member of the Indianapolis Colts, Saskatchewan Roughriders, Winnipeg Blue Bombers, Ottawa Redblacks, and BC Lions.

== High school and college ==
Lankford played wide receiver, defensive back, kicker, punter, and also served as a kickoff and punt returner for Paxon School for Advanced Studies. He also lettered in track and field. Lankford then attended the University of Illinois at Urbana–Champaign, where he played 43 games and recorded 70 receptions for 1,014 receiving yards. He also played as a punter, averaging 39.4 yards on 19 punts. As a junior in 2012, Lankford led the team in receiving yards (469) and touchdowns (5).

== Professional career ==
=== Miami Dolphins ===
After going undrafted in 2014 Lankford signed with the Miami Dolphins on May 11, 2014, and was waived four days later.

=== Indianapolis Colts ===
On May 18, he signed with the Indianapolis Colts. He was waived on August 30, and re-signed to the practice squad on September 1. On January 19, 2015, he signed a reserve/future contract with the Colts. He was released by the Colts on August 31, 2016.

=== Saskatchewan Roughriders ===
Lankford signed with the Saskatchewan Roughriders of the Canadian Football League (CFL) on November 7, 2015. He played in one game during their 2015 season. In his second season in the CFL Lankford saw more playing time, playing in 9 games, catching 19 passes for 165 yards. Despite the increased play time he was on, and off the practice roster multiple times during the season, and was ultimately released on October 25, 2016.

=== Winnipeg Blue Bombers ===
On January 24, 2017, Lankford signed with the Winnipeg Blue Bombers (CFL).

=== Ottawa Redblacks ===
Lankford signed with the Ottawa Redblacks on February 13, 2019, at the start of free agency. He played in three of the first four games of the season for Ottawa, but made a costly error on a punt return in Week 4 which lead to being dismissed from the team.

=== BC Lions ===
On July 15, 2019, it was announced that Lankford had signed with the BC Lions.

== Personal ==
Lankford's father, Paul, played cornerback for the Miami Dolphins from 1982 to 1991.
