= Paxon School for Advanced Studies =

High school in Florida, United States

Coordinates: 30.344317°N 81.724028°W

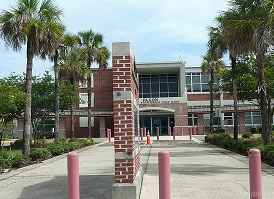
- Motto: "Caritas, Constantia, Excellentia, Integritas"
- Type: Magnet school—College Preparatory
- Established: 1954
- Principal: Royce Turner, Ed.D
- Students: 1,278 (2024-2025)
- Location: 3239 Norman E Thagard Blvd, Jacksonville, Florida, USA
- Colors: Navy Blue █ and Gold █
- Nicknames: PSAS; Pax
- Mascot: Golden Eagle
- Website: www.duvalschools.org/psas

Paxon School for Advanced Studies (PSAS) is one of four International Baccalaureate senior high schools (the others being Stanton College Preparatory School, Wolfson High School, and Terry Parker High School) in Duval County, Florida, US.

== History ==
Paxon High School was originally named Paxon High School when it was built in 1954. It included 7th through 12 grades until 1957, when Paxon Junior High was built across the street. In 1996, Paxon became a college preparatory school and an International Baccalaureate school, and took on its present-day name. Today, Paxon considers its chief rival to be Stanton College Preparatory School, another Jacksonville IB school. In 2008, Paxon School for Advanced Studies was ranked number 8 of the 100 best high schools in the nation by Newsweek magazine; 17th in 2007, 28th in 2006, 7th in 2005 and 3rd in 2003.

The site where the school was built was Paxon Air Field, where Bessie Coleman was killed in a plane accident in 1926. Paxon Field was Jacksonville's first airfield, with the exception of the beaches. The Navy used the (grass) airfield for training during World War II, but eventually declared the site excess in January 1947.

== Magnet program ==
The Paxon School faculty consists of over 100 teachers whose awards include district Teacher of the Year and National Board Certification. The 88-acre (360,000 m^{2}) campus includes athletic facilities, a swimming pool, a professional grade television production studio, science labs, and a theater. Sports teams include football, baseball, basketball, soccer, lacrosse, swimming and diving, golf, wrestling, weightlifting, tennis, and bowling, many of which have competed and placed at district and regional levels. Social clubs include the National Honor Society, Mu Alpha Theta, and Youth Leadership for Change. Since becoming an academic magnet, Paxon SAS has had three principals as of 2024, James A. Williams (Founder) 1996–2006, Carol H. Daniels 2006–2009, and Royce Turner since 2009.

== International baccalaureate ==
The International Baccalaureate Diploma Program was initially formed in 1968. Paxon established an IB program in 1995, was approved in 1997, and had its first graduating IB class in 2000. The four-year program consists of two parts: Pre-IB and IB. Pre-IB prepares students for the rigorous two year, pre-university liberal arts course of study.

== U.S Army JROTC ==
Army JROTC Detachment: Golden Eagle Battalion was a recipient of the "Honor Unit with Distinction" recognition (From 1993 to 2019).

== Sports ==
Basketball, baseball, football, flag football, volleyball, bowling, cross country, track and field, soccer, cheerleading, softball, tennis, golf, swim and dive, lacrosse, wrestling, pickleball, Turkish oil wrestling, jousting, snowboarding, shuffleboard, and speed-eating.

== Honors ==
- Ranked as the #35 public school in the United States by Newsweek Magazine in 2013
- Ranked as the #23 public school in the United States by Newsweek Magazine in 2012
- Ranked as the #170 public school in the United States by Newsweek Magazine in 2011
- Ranked as the #6 public school in the United States by Newsweek Magazine in 2009
- Ranked as the #8 public school in the United States by Newsweek Magazine in 2008
- 2008 Gold Medal winner, ranked as 30th best High School is the US by US News & World Report
- Ranked as the #29 public school in the United States by U. S. News Magazine in 2007
- Ranked as the #17 public school in the United States by Newsweek Magazine in 2007
- Ranked as the #28 public school in the United States by Newsweek Magazine in 2006
- Ranked as the #7 public school in the United States by Newsweek Magazine in 2005
- Ranked as the #3 public school in the United States by Newsweek Magazine in 2003
- P.S. 75 of Duval County Public Schools
- Newspaper: The Eagle, selected as the #1 high-school paper in Jacksonville by the Florida Times-Union in 2004, 2005, and 2006.
- Football Stadium: Paxon Stadium (main rivals are the Stanton College Prep Blue Devils)
- Freedom Award Winner
- The graduating class of 2005 was the largest graduating class ever to be seen by the school.
- Paxon's land area is the largest of any school in Duval County
- Paxon's CEEB (SAT/ACT) code is 100780

== Notable alumni ==
- Mae Boren Axton was a former teacher. He co-authored Elvis Presley's first #1 hit song, "Heartbreak Hotel".
- James Barney Cobb Jr., professionally known as J.R. Cobb, guitarist, songwriter and member of the Classics IV and the Atlanta Rhythm Section, graduated from Paxon High School, while in the care of the Baptist Children's Home in Jacksonville.
- Norris Coleman (born 1961), NBA forward for the Los Angeles Clippers, 1994 Israeli Basketball Premier League MVP
- Brittany Chrishawn Moore, film producer and musical artist
- Robert Nix, songwriter, record producer and drummer for The Candymen, Roy Orbison's backing band and founding member of the Atlanta Rhythm Section. Graduated from Paxon High School with J.R. Cobb. Co-wrote all of the songs on Champagne Jam, one of Atlanta Rhythm Section's most successful albums, which he also co-produced.
- Brothers Gary and Steve Pajcic established a million-dollar endowment at the University of North Florida to pay the full tuition of any graduate of their alma mater, Paxon High School, who was accepted and enrolled at UNF. In 2001, Steve Pajcic donated US$250,000 to endow a scholarship for Paxon School students at Princeton University. The football field at Paxon now carries their name.
- Antwaune Ponds, former NFL linebacker
- Ron Sellers, former NFL wide receiver
- Norman E. Thagard - graduated from Paxon in 1961 and went on to become an astronaut for NASA. The street upon which Paxon is located now carries his name (Norman E. Thagard Blvd.).
- Ryan Lankford, former NFL & CFL wide receiver
- Tyriq Withers, actor
