= Nat Moore =

American football player (born 1951)

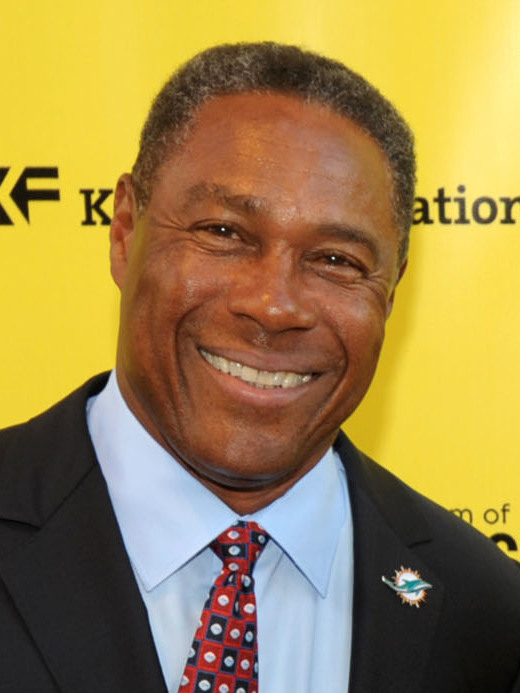
- Moore in 2014

No. 89
- Position: Wide receiver

Personal information
- Born: September 19, 1951 (age 75); Tallahassee, Florida, U.S.
- Listed height: 5 ft 9 in (1.75 m)
- Listed weight: 184 lb (83 kg)

Career information
- High school: Edison (Miami, Florida)
- College: Florida (1972–1973)
- NFL draft: 1974: 3rd round, 78th overall pick

Career history
- Miami Dolphins (1974–1986)

Awards and highlights
- First-team All-Pro (1977); Pro Bowl (1977); NFL receiving touchdowns leader (1977); PFWA NFL All-Rookie Team (1974); Miami Dolphins Honor Roll; Dolphins Walk of Fame (2012); First-team All-SEC (1972); University of Florida Athletic Hall of Fame; Florida–Georgia Hall of Fame

Career NFL statistics
- Games played: 183
- Games started: 124
- Receptions: 510
- Receiving yards: 7,546
- Receiving touchdowns: 74
- Stats at Pro Football Reference

Nathaniel Moore (born September 19, 1951) is an American former professional football player who was a wide receiver in the National Football League (NFL) for 13 seasons during the 1970s and 1980s. Moore played college football for the Florida Gators, and thereafter, he played professionally for the Miami Dolphins of the NFL. He is best known as a favorite passing target of Dolphins quarterbacks Bob Griese and Dan Marino.

Moore is also credited as football consultant in the 1977 movie Black Sunday.

== Early life ==
Moore was born in Tallahassee, Florida in 1951. He grew up in Miami, Florida and attended Miami Edison Senior High School and Miami-Dade Community College.

== College career ==
He originally earned a scholarship to the Universifty of Tennessee-Martin. Unhappy at UTM, Moore returned to Miami and enrolled at Miami-Dade Community College before moving to the University of Florida to become a standout running back for coach Doug Dickey's Gators teams in 1972 and 1973. As a junior in 1972, Moore led the Gators with 145 rushes for 845 yards and nine rushing touchdowns, 25 receptions for 351 receiving yards and four touchdown catches, and 230 return yards, while earning first-team All-Southeastern Conference (SEC) and honorable mention All-American accolades.

Moore graduated from Florida with a bachelor's degree in exercise and sport science in 1975, and he was inducted into the University of Florida Athletic Hall of Fame as a "Gator Great" in 1978. In a 2006 article series published by The Gainesville Sun, the newspaper's sportswriters ranked him as No. 49 among the 100 all-time greatest Florida Gators of the team's first 100 seasons.

== Professional career ==
Moore was chosen by the Miami Dolphins in the third round (78th overall) of the 1974 NFL draft, and he played for the Dolphins for 13 seasons from 1974 to 1986. He was elected to the Pro Bowl in 1977, after a season in which he made 52 receptions and led the league with 12 receiving touchdowns (he also had a rushing touchdown that year). Moore is immortalized in the famous "Helicopter Catch" video clip—while making a reception against the New York Jets at Giants Stadium in 1984, he was hit simultaneously from opposite directions by two Jets tacklers sending his body spinning into the air. The catch was a crucial third-down conversion, leading to a score and a come-from-behind win in a closely contested divisional game.

By the time Moore retired at the end of 1986, his 13th season with the Dolphins, he had broken almost every receiving record of the Dolphins; his team records, however, were subsequently broken by teammates Mark Clayton and Mark Duper.

His final career receiving statistics were 510 catches for 7,547 yards and 74 touchdowns. He also rushed for 249 yards and a touchdown, returned 27 punts for 297 yards, and gained 856 yards on 33 kickoff returns.

== Career statistics ==
Legend
	Led the league
**Bold**	Career high

=== Regular season ===
Year	Team	GP	Receiving				
Year	Team	GP	Rec	Yds	Avg	Lng	TD
1974	MIA	14	37	605	16.4	48	2
1975	MIA	14	40	705	**17.6**	**79**	4
1976	MIA	9	33	625	18.9	67	4
1977	MIA	14	**52**	765	14.7	73	**12**
1978	MIA	**16**	48	645	13.4	47	10
1979	MIA	**16**	48	**840**	17.5	53	6
1980	MIA	**16**	47	564	12.0	33	7
1981	MIA	13	26	452	17.4	52	2
1982	MIA	9	8	82	10.3	23	1
1983	MIA	**16**	39	558	14.3	66	6
1984	MIA	**16**	43	573	13.3	37	6
1985	MIA	15	51	701	13.7	69	7
1986	MIA	**16**	38	431	11.3	38	7
Career		183	510	7,546	14.8	79	74

== Life after football ==
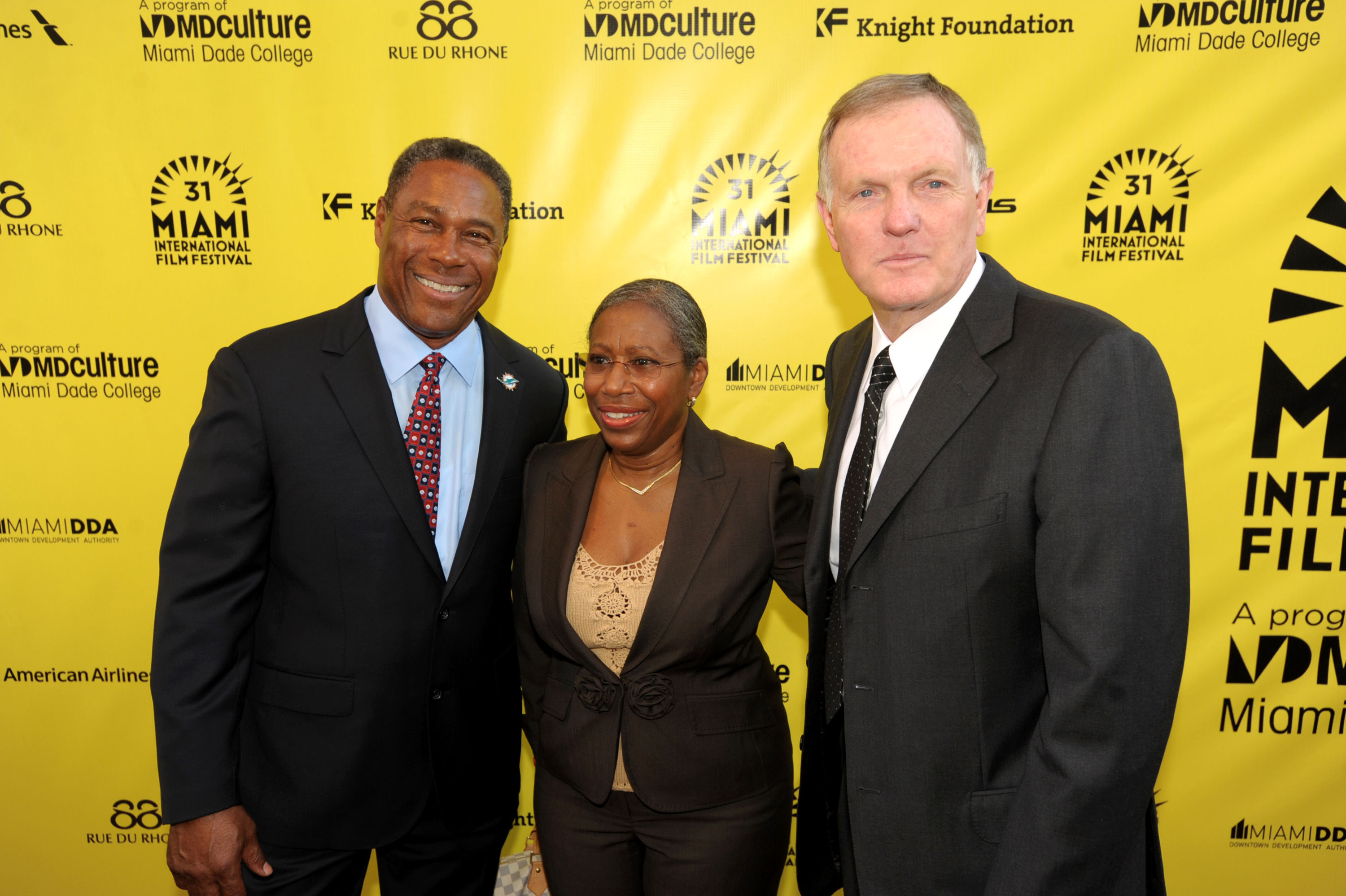
Nat Moore (left) and Bob Griese (right) at the 2014 Miami International Film Festival

Moore is known for his humanitarian work and philanthropy. In 1984, the NFL voted Moore as "Man of the Year," an honor given to a player who gives outstanding service to his community. Moore also received the Byron White Humanitarian Award in 1986. He created The Nat Moore Foundation, an organization through which he continues to work with disadvantaged youths in the Miami-Dade County area, in 1998.

He also worked for the NFL in the 1990s to monitor player uniform violations.

On December 5, 1999, he was added to the Miami Dolphins Honor Roll.

Moore was a football broadcaster for Florida Gators football games on Sun Sports until 2011. As an announcer, he was notorious for adding an "s" to the last names of various players (Chris Leak became "Chris Leaks," Percy Harvin became "Harvins," etc.) In addition, he teams with Bob Griese to provide television analysis of preseason Dolphins games. He also owns a sports promotions firm, Nat Moore & Associates, Inc. He is a vice president in the Miami Dolphins organization and oversees the Miami Dolphins Alumni Association, and also serves as the executive director of the NFL Super Bowl Football Clinic.

== See also ==
- Florida Gators football, 1970–79
- List of Florida Gators in the NFL draft
- List of Miami Dolphins players
- List of University of Florida alumni
- List of University of Florida Athletic Hall of Fame members
