= Cap Boso =

American football player (born 1963)

No. 89, 86
- Position: Tight end

Personal information
- Born: September 10, 1963 (age 63); Kansas City, Missouri, U.S.
- Listed height: 6 ft 4 in (1.93 m)
- Listed weight: 232 lb (105 kg)

Career information
- High school: Bishop Chatard (Indianapolis, Indiana)
- College: Illinois
- NFL draft: 1986: 8th round, 207th overall pick

Career history
- Pittsburgh Steelers (1986)*; St. Louis Cardinals (1986); Chicago Bears (1987–1991)
- * Offseason or practice squad member only

Awards and highlights
- First-team All-Big Ten (1984)

Career NFL statistics
- Receptions: 54
- Receiving yards: 591
- Receiving touchdowns: 4
- Stats at Pro Football Reference

Casper "Cap" Boso (born September 10, 1962) is an American former professional football player who was a tight end for six seasons in the National Football League (NFL) for the St. Louis Cardinals and Chicago Bears. He played college football for the Illinois Fighting Illini.

Boso attended and played football for Bishop Chatard High School in Indianapolis, Indiana, and played college football at the University of Illinois Urbana-Champaign with Jack Trudeau. Selected by the Pittsburgh Steelers in the eighth round (207th overall) of the 1986 NFL draft, Boso was cut early and subsequently signed by the St. Louis Cardinals, for whom he played two games in 1986. In 1987, the Cardinals waived him and the Chicago Bears signed him. Boso played for the Bears until 1991, when he experienced a series of knee injuries and retired from active play. Boso later filed suit and won the right to receive $353 a week in disability pay for the rest of his life.
