= Kirk Lowdermilk =

American football player (born 1963)

No. 63
- Position: Center

Personal information
- Born: April 10, 1963 (age 63); Canton, Ohio, U.S.
- Listed height: 6 ft 3 in (1.91 m)
- Listed weight: 263 lb (119 kg)

Career information
- High school: Salem (Salem, Ohio)
- College: Ohio State
- NFL draft: 1985: 3rd round, 59th overall pick

Career history
- Minnesota Vikings (1985–1992); Indianapolis Colts (1993–1996)

Awards and highlights
- Second-team All-American (1984); First-team All-Big Ten (1984); Second-team All-Big Ten (1983)

Career NFL statistics
- Games played: 178
- Games started: 150
- Fumble recoveries: 4
- Stats at Pro Football Reference

Robert Kirk Lowdermilk (born April 10, 1963) is an American former professional football player who was a center for 12 seasons (178 games) in the National Football League (NFL), with the Minnesota Vikings and Indianapolis Colts. He was selected by the Vikings in the third round of the 1985 NFL draft with the 59th overall pick. He attended Salem High School and played college football for the Ohio State Buckeyes. According to Lowdermilk's 1988 NFL player trading card, he was the youngest starting center in 1987. His son John Lowdermilk also played in the NFL.
