= Larry Emery =

American football player (born 1964)

No. 24
- Positions: Running back, return specialist

Personal information
- Born: July 13, 1964 (age 62); Macon, Georgia, U.S.
- Listed height: 5 ft 9 in (1.75 m)
- Listed weight: 195 lb (88 kg)

Career information
- High school: Northeast (Macon)
- College: Wisconsin
- NFL draft: 1987: 12th round, 320th overall pick

Career history
- Atlanta Falcons (1987–1988); Houston Oilers (1989)*
- * Offseason or practice squad member only

Awards and highlights
- 3× Second-team All-Big Ten (1984, 1985, 1986)

Career NFL statistics
- Rushing yards: 5
- Rushing average: 5
- Receptions: 5
- Receiving yards: 31
- Return yards: 440
- Stats at Pro Football Reference

Larry Emery (born July 13, 1964) is an American former professional football player who was a running back in the National Football League (NFL). He played college football for the Wisconsin Badgers and was selected by the Atlanta Falcons in the 12th round of the 1987 NFL draft with the 320th overall pick.

He played one season with the Falcons, playing five games mostly as a kick returner. He signed as a free agent with the Houston Oilers in 1989. In a preseason game against the Raiders, Emery rushed for 42 yards on 12 carries. The Oilers waved him on September 4, 1989.

At Wisconsin, Emery rushed for 2,979 yards and 19 touchdowns.
