= Ron Davenport =

American football player (born 1962)

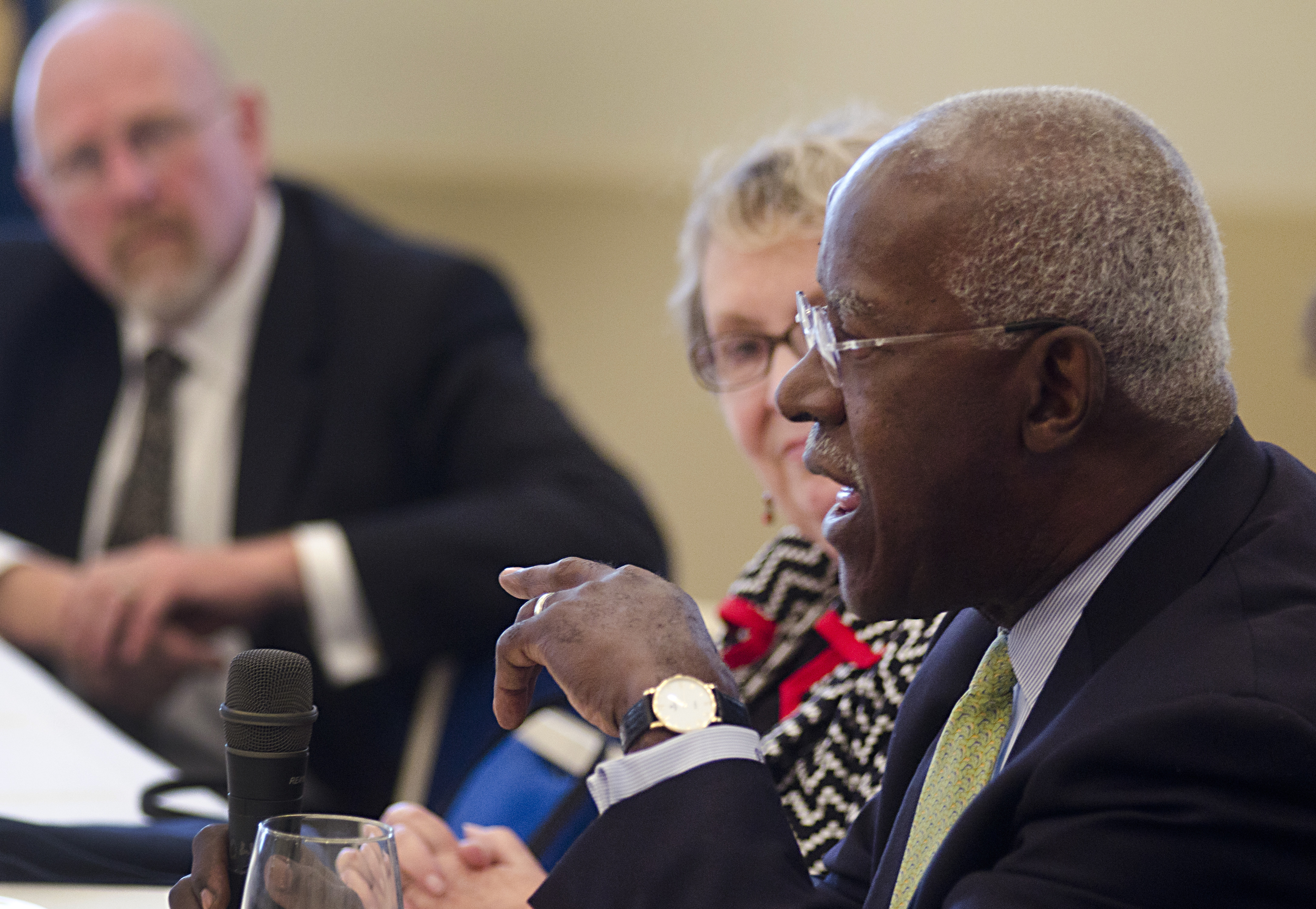

No. 30
- Position: Fullback

Personal information
- Born: December 22, 1962 (age 63); Somerset, Bermuda
- Listed height: 6 ft 2 in (1.88 m)
- Listed weight: 230 lb (104 kg)

Career information
- High school: George (Atlanta, Georgia, U.S.)
- College: Louisville
- NFL draft: 1985: 6th round, 167th overall pick

Career history
- Miami Dolphins (1985–1989)

Career NFL statistics
- Rushing yards: 1,127
- Rushing average: 4.1
- Total touchdowns: 17
- Stats at Pro Football Reference

Ronald Donovan Davenport (born December 22, 1962) is an American former professional football player who was a fullback in the National Football League (NFL). He played for the Miami Dolphins from 1985 to 1989. Davenport played college football for the Louisville Cardinals before being selected by the Dolphins in the sixth round of the 1985 NFL draft with the 167th overall pick. He scored 11 rushing touchdowns for the Dolphins in his rookie season.

== NFL career statistics ==
Legend
**Bold**	Career high

=== Regular season ===
Year	Team	Games		Rushing					Receiving				
Year	Team	GP	GS	Att	Yds	Avg	Lng	TD	Rec	Yds	Avg	Lng	TD
1985	MIA	**16**	1	**98**	**370**	3.8	33	**11**	13	74	5.7	17	**2**
1986	MIA	**16**	2	75	314	4.2	35	0	20	177	8.9	27	1
1987	MIA	10	1	32	114	3.6	27	1	27	249	9.2	**29**	1
1988	MIA	**16**	**5**	55	273	**5.0**	**64**	0	**30**	**282**	**9.4**	27	0
1989	MIA	9	3	14	56	4.0	9	1	3	19	6.3	9	0
		67	12	274	1,127	4.1	64	13	93	801	8.6	29	4

=== Playoffs ===
Year	Team	Games		Rushing					Receiving				
Year	Team	GP	GS	Att	Yds	Avg	Lng	TD	Rec	Yds	Avg	Lng	TD
1985	MIA	2	0	9	54	6.0	31	2	3	23	7.7	9	0
		2	0	9	54	6.0	31	2	3	23	7.7	9	0
