= Jim Lachey =

American football player (born 1963)

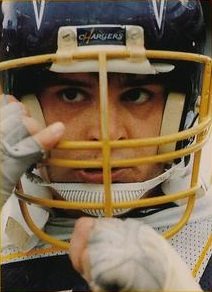
- Lachey c. 1986

No. 74, 79
- Position: Offensive tackle

Personal information
- Born: June 4, 1963 (age 63); St. Henry, Ohio, U.S.
- Listed height: 6 ft 6 in (1.98 m)
- Listed weight: 294 lb (133 kg)

Career information
- High school: St. Henry
- College: Ohio State
- NFL draft: 1985: 1st round, 12th overall pick

Career history
- San Diego Chargers (1985–1987); Los Angeles Raiders (1988); Washington Redskins (1988–1995)

Awards and highlights
- Super Bowl champion (1991); 3× First-team All-Pro (1989–1991); Second-team All-Pro (1987); 3× Pro Bowl (1987, 1990, 1991); PFWA All-Rookie Team (1985); 70 Greatest Redskins; Consensus All-American (1984); First-team All-Big Ten (1984)

Career NFL statistics
- Games played: 131
- Games started: 129
- Fumble recoveries: 3
- Stats at Pro Football Reference

James Michael Lachey (born June 4, 1963) is an American former professional football player who was an offensive tackle for 10 seasons in the National Football League (NFL) with the San Diego Chargers, Los Angeles Raiders, and Washington Redskins. He was selected by the Chargers in the first round of the 1985 NFL draft with the 12th overall pick.

He played college football for the Ohio State Buckeyes, earning All-American honors. He was a three-time Pro Bowl player in 1987 with the Chargers, and 1990 and 1991 with the Redskins as a member of "the Hogs." He helped the Redskins win Super Bowl XXVI. He was also a four-time All-Pro selection. After his playing career, he became a radio analyst for Ohio State football.

== Personal life ==
Lachey later became a broadcaster and wrote a book called Jim Lachey: The Ultimate Protector.

Lachey has been a radio broadcaster for Buckeyes football games since 1997. His son Luke, currently a tight end for the Houston Texans of the National Football League, says Jim encouraged him to make his own college decision, "pick wherever I want to go, it’s not about anyone else.”

For Luke's final college home game on Friday, November 29, 2024, Lachey traveled to Iowa to watch his son play and initially planned to miss the Michigan–Ohio State game of November 30, which would have broken a streak of 357 consecutive Buckeyes games called. After news of Lachey's streak ending became public knowledge, Ohio State head coach Ryan Day arranged a private flight for Lachey to return to Columbus in time for the Ohio State game. Lachey was on the Buckeyes radio broadcast on November 30, his 358th consecutive game called.

Lachey coached for the Columbus Destroyers during their run to the XXI Arena Bowl in 2007.

== Awards and honors ==
NCAA

- 1984 First-team All-American

NFL

- Three-time NFL All-Pro First-team
- Three-time NFL Pro Bowl selection
- Super Bowl XXVI winner (as a member of the Washington Redskins)
