= Alex Moyer =

American football player (born 1963)

No. 54
- Position: Linebacker

Personal information
- Born: October 25, 1963 (age 63); Detroit, Michigan, U.S.
- Listed height: 6 ft 1 in (1.85 m)
- Listed weight: 225 lb (102 kg)

Career information
- High school: St. John's Military Academy (Delafield, WI)
- College: Northwestern
- NFL draft: 1985: 3rd round, 83rd overall pick

Career history
- Miami Dolphins (1985–1986); San Francisco 49ers (1986)

Career NFL statistics
- Interceptions: 1
- Fumble recoveries: 1
- Stats at Pro Football Reference

Alex Moyer (born October 25, 1963) is an American former professional football player who was a linebacker in the National Football League (NFL). Moyer was selected by the Miami Dolphins in the third round of the 1985 NFL draft. He played two seasons in the NFL.

== Early life ==
Moyer attended the St. John's Military Academy in Delafield, Wisconsin.
