= James Pruitt =

American football player (born 1964)

No. 82, 49, 86, 87, 81, 89, 19
- Position: Wide receiver

Personal information
- Born: January 29, 1964 (age 62); Los Angeles, California, U.S.
- Listed height: 6 ft 3 in (1.91 m)
- Listed weight: 199 lb (90 kg)

Career information
- High school: Jefferson (Los Angeles)
- College: Cal State Fullerton
- NFL draft: 1986: 4th round, 107th overall pick

Career history
- Miami Dolphins (1986–1988); Indianapolis Colts (1988–1989); Miami Dolphins (1990); Minnesota Vikings (1991)*; Miami Dolphins (1991); Ottawa Rough Riders (1992); Sacramento Gold Miners (1993–1994)
- * Offseason or practice squad member only

Career NFL statistics
- Receptions: 63
- Receiving yards: 1,013
- Touchdowns: 9
- Stats at Pro Football Reference

James Bouvias Pruitt (born January 29, 1964) is an American former professional football player who was a wide receiver for six seasons in the National Football League (NFL) for the Miami Dolphins from 1986 to 1988 and 1990 to 1991, and the Indianapolis Colts from 1988 to 1989. He played college football for the Cal State Fullerton Titans and was selected by the Dolphins in the fourth round of the 1986 NFL draft. He finished his career in the Canadian Football League (CFL) playing for the Ottawa Rough Riders and Sacramento Gold Miners.
