= Mike Smith (defensive back) =

American football player (born 1962)

No. 18, 25
- Position: Cornerback

Personal information
- Born: October 24, 1962 (age 64); Houston, Texas, U.S.
- Listed height: 6 ft 0 in (1.83 m)
- Listed weight: 171 lb (78 kg)

Career information
- High school: Booker T. Washington (Houston)
- College: UTEP
- NFL draft: 1985: 4th round, 91st overall pick

Career history
- Miami Dolphins (1985–1987)
- Stats at Pro Football Reference

Michael Wayne Smith (born October 24, 1962) is an American former professional football cornerback who played for the Miami Dolphins of the National Football League (NFL). He played college football for the UTEP Miners and was selected by the Dolphins in the fourth round of the 1985 NFL draft.

== Early life ==
Michael Wayne Smith was born on October 24, 1962, in Houston, Texas. He attended Booker T. Washington High School in Houston.

== College career ==
Smith enrolled at the University of Texas at El Paso to play college football for the UTEP Miners. He was a four-year letterman from 1981 to 1984. He recorded two interceptions during his college career.

== Professional career ==
Smith was selected by the Miami Dolphins in the fourth round, with the 91st overall pick, of the 1985 NFL draft. He signed with the team on May 30. He was waived on October 5 but re-signed on November 13 after Robert Sowell suffered an injury. Smith played in seven games overall during the 1985 season as a reserve cornerback/safety. He also appeared in one playoff game. He played in 14 games as a backup cornerback in 1986, recording one sack, one forced fumble, and one fumble recovery, before being placed on injured reserve on December 9. Smith missed three games during the 1987 season due to the 1987 NFL players strike. He appeared in eight games total in 1987, posting one forced fumble. He was released on August 28, 1988, after the final game of the 1988 preseason.
