= Paul Lankford =

American football player (born 1958)

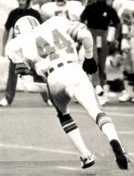
- Lankford playing for the Dolphins in 1985

No. 44
- Position: Cornerback

Personal information
- Born: June 15, 1958 (age 68); Farmingdale, New York, U.S.
- Listed height: 6 ft 1 in (1.85 m)
- Listed weight: 185 lb (84 kg)

Career information
- High school: Farmingdale (Farmingdale, New York)
- College: Penn State
- NFL draft: 1982: 3rd round, 80th overall pick

Career history
- Miami Dolphins (1982–1991)

Awards and highlights
- Second-team All-East (1981)

Career NFL statistics
- Sacks: 3
- Forced fumbles: 8
- Interceptions: 13
- Stats at Pro Football Reference

Paul Lankford (born June 15, 1958) is an American former professional football player who was a cornerback for 10 seasons in the National Football League (NFL). He played in two Super Bowls for the Miami Dolphins. He played collegiately at Penn State and is the father of former Illinois wide receiver Ryan Lankford, who signed with the Dolphins in 2014.

Lankford was recruited to play football at Penn State but was told by coach Joe Paterno that he had to choose between track and field or football. Lankford chose football and did not play football for his first two years at Penn State. Lankford was an All-American hurdler for the Penn State Nittany Lions track and field team, finishing 4th in the 400 m hurdles at the 1980 and 1981 NCAA Division I Outdoor Track and Field Championships. He finished seventh in the hurdles at the 1980 United States Olympic trials. After two years at Penn State, Paterno allowed him to join the football team and he earned a job as a starting cornerback.
