= Jack Trudeau =

American football player (born 1962)

No. 10
- Position: Quarterback

Personal information
- Born: September 9, 1962 (age 64); Forest Lake, Minnesota, U.S.
- Listed height: 6 ft 3 in (1.91 m)
- Listed weight: 220 lb (100 kg)

Career information
- High school: Granada (Livermore, California)
- College: Illinois
- NFL draft: 1986: 2nd round, 47th overall pick
- Expansion draft: 1995: 28th round, 56th overall pick

Career history
- Indianapolis Colts (1986–1993); New York Jets (1994); Carolina Panthers (1995)

Awards and highlights
- 2× Second-team All-Big Ten (1983, 1984)

Career NFL statistics
- Passing attempts: 1,644
- Passing completions: 873
- Completion percentage: 53.1%
- TD–INT: 42–69
- Passing yards: 10,243
- Passer rating: 63.3
- Stats at Pro Football Reference

Jack Francis Trudeau (born September 9, 1962) is an American former professional football player who was a quarterback for 10 seasons in the National Football League (NFL) from 1986 to 1995. He played college football for the Illinois Fighting Illini and was selected by the Indianapolis Colts in the second round of the 1986 NFL draft. After his playing career, he was a morning show co-host on Fox Sports Radio.

== Early life ==
Trudeau was born in Forest Lake, Minnesota. He graduated from Granada High School in Livermore, California.

== College career ==
Trudeau was the starting quarterback of the Illinois Fighting Illini football team from 1983 to 1985, his sophomore through senior years. As a sophomore, he helped the Illini become the first and only Big Ten team to beat all nine conference opponents in a single season. The Illini went to the 1984 Rose Bowl where they lost to UCLA, 45–9. Trudeau earned All-Big Ten honors in 1984 and 1985. He set Illinois school records in pass attempts (1151), completions (737), yards (8146) and touchdowns (51). He also set an NCAA record with 215 consecutive pass attempts without an interception. In 1984, he finished runner-up to Doug Flutie for the Davey O'Brien Award, given to the top college quarterback in the nation.

== Professional career ==
During his rookie season, Trudeau started eleven games - all Colts' losses. After splitting time with Gary Hogeboom and Blair Kiel in 1987, Trudeau led the Colts to three wins in their final four games and the franchise's first playoff appearance since moving to Indianapolis in 1984. He started the Colts' 38-21 Divisional Round loss in Cleveland, throwing two touchdown passes in the defeat. In 1988, he played in just two games as Chris Chandler supplanted him under center. Trudeau had his best season as a pro in 1989, starting twelve games and throwing for career-highs in yards (2,317) and touchdowns (15) en route to being named the Colts' Offensive MVP. However, in the 1990 NFL draft, the Colts traded with Atlanta to select Indianapolis native Jeff George with the first overall pick, and George began that next season as the starter. Over the next four seasons, Trudeau made only fourteen more starts and was mostly a backup.

During the 1994 season, Trudeau signed with the New York Jets to back up Boomer Esiason. When Esiason went down with an injury early in the season, Trudeau started two games - including one against the Colts, his former team. Trudeau was selected by the Carolina Panthers in the 1995 NFL expansion draft to become the third-string quarterback behind Frank Reich and Kerry Collins in the team's inaugural season. After appearing in just one game with Carolina, Trudeau retired following the 1995 season.

Trudeau finished his ten-year NFL career with 10,243 passing yards, 42 touchdowns, 69 interceptions, and a 63.3 passer rating in 67 games.

== NFL career statistics ==
Legend
| **Bold** | Career high |

=== Regular season ===
| Year | Team | Games | | | Passing | | | | | | | | | Rushing | | | | | Sacks | |
| Year | Team | GP | GS | Record | Cmp | Att | Pct | Yds | Y/A | Lng | TD | Int | Rtg | Att | Yds | Avg | Lng | TD | Sck | Yds |
|---|---|---|---|---|---|---|---|---|---|---|---|---|---|---|---|---|---|---|---|---|
| 1986 | IND | 12 | 11 | 0-11 | **204** | **417** | 48.9 | 2,225 | 5.3 | **84** | 8 | **18** | 53.5 | 13 | 21 | 1.6 | 8 | 1 | **29** | **213** |
| 1987 | IND | 10 | 8 | 5-3 | 128 | 229 | 55.9 | 1,587 | 6.9 | 55 | 6 | 6 | 75.4 | 15 | 7 | 0.5 | 9 | 0 | 13 | 100 |
| 1988 | IND | 2 | 2 | 0-2 | 14 | 34 | 41.2 | 158 | 4.6 | 48 | 0 | 3 | 19.0 | 0 | 0 | 0.0 | 0 | 0 | 2 | 13 |
| 1989 | IND | **13** | **12** | **7-5** | 190 | 362 | 52.5 | **2,317** | 6.4 | 71 | **15** | 13 | 71.3 | **35** | **91** | 2.6 | **17** | **2** | 20 | 125 |
| 1990 | IND | 6 | 4 | 2-2 | 84 | 144 | 58.3 | 1,078 | **7.5** | 73 | 6 | 6 | **78.4** | 10 | 28 | 2.8 | 9 | 0 | 14 | 104 |
| 1991 | IND | 2 | 0 | 0-0 | 2 | 7 | 28.6 | 19 | 2.7 | 11 | 0 | 1 | 0.0 | 0 | 0 | 0.0 | 0 | 0 | 1 | 6 |
| 1992 | IND | 11 | 5 | 2-3 | 105 | 181 | 58.0 | 1,271 | 7.0 | 81 | 4 | 8 | 68.6 | 13 | 6 | 0.5 | 5 | 0 | 11 | 85 |
| 1993 | IND | 5 | 5 | 2-3 | 85 | 162 | 52.5 | 992 | 6.1 | 68 | 2 | 7 | 57.4 | 5 | 3 | 0.6 | 2 | 0 | 2 | 11 |
| 1994 | NYJ | 5 | 2 | 1-1 | 50 | 91 | 54.9 | 496 | 5.5 | 24 | 1 | 4 | 55.9 | 6 | 30 | **5.0** | 15 | 0 | 9 | 52 |
| 1995 | CAR | 1 | 0 | 0-0 | 11 | 17 | **64.7** | 100 | 5.9 | 19 | 0 | 3 | 40.9 | 0 | 0 | 0.0 | 0 | 0 | 2 | 8 |
| Career | | 67 | 49 | 19-30 | 873 | 1,644 | 53.1 | 10,243 | 6.2 | 84 | 42 | 69 | 63.3 | 97 | 186 | 1.9 | 17 | 3 | 103 | 717 |

=== Playoffs ===
| Year | Team | Games | | | Passing | | | | | | | | | Rushing | | | | | Sacks | |
| Year | Team | GP | GS | Record | Cmp | Att | Pct | Yds | Y/A | Lng | TD | Int | Rtg | Att | Yds | Avg | Lng | TD | Sck | Yds |
|---|---|---|---|---|---|---|---|---|---|---|---|---|---|---|---|---|---|---|---|---|
| 1987 | IND | 1 | 1 | 0-1 | 21 | 33 | 63.6 | 251 | 7.6 | 29 | 2 | 1 | 94.4 | 2 | 4 | 2.0 | 4 | 0 | 2 | 14 |
| Career | | 1 | 1 | 0-1 | 21 | 33 | 63.6 | 251 | 7.6 | 29 | 2 | 1 | 94.4 | 2 | 4 | 2.0 | 4 | 0 | 2 | 14 |

== Personal life ==
He and his ex-wife Lisa have a daughter (Danielle) and three sons (John, Beau, and Trey). His brother Kevin was drafted at age 18 as a pitcher for the New York Yankees organization. After retiring from football, Jack Trudeau invested to be a co-owner of Wolf Run Golf Club in Indiana. . He was a weekly guest on The Bob and Tom Show, broadcast out of Indianapolis, for many seasons, discussing the Colts and other happenings in the NFL.

=== Radio career ===
In 2010, Trudeau began hosting a local sports talk morning show with Zakk Tyler on WNDE in Indianapolis. The next year, the show (called Zakk and Jack) was picked up for national syndication by Fox Sports Radio to replace the departing Stephen A. Smith. The show was cancelled by FSR later that same year, as the pair were replaced by Andy Furman and former NFL defensive back Artrell Hawkins.

Trudeau was involved in a controversial exchange in August 2011 with then first-year Indiana Hoosiers football head coach Kevin Wilson. During the interview, Wilson responded to Trudeau's mocking of Indiana's football team by pointing out the former quarterback's criminal history.

=== DUI Arrest ===
Trudeau was arrested for his second DUI in Indiana in July 2015 along with allegations of intimidating a police officer after testing 0.31 on a breath test and threatening to kill an Indiana officer. He was arrested previously in 1990.
