= Bud Brown (American football) =

American football player (born 1961)

No. 43
- Position: Safety

Personal information
- Born: April 19, 1961 (age 65); De Kalb, Mississippi, U.S.
- Listed height: 6 ft 0 in (1.83 m)
- Listed weight: 194 lb (88 kg)

Career information
- College: Southern Mississippi
- NFL draft: 1984: 11th round, 305th overall pick

Career history
- Miami Dolphins (1984–1988)

Career NFL statistics
- Interceptions: 5
- Interception yards: 96
- Fumble recoveries: 8
- Stats at Pro Football Reference

Charles Lee Brown (born April 19, 1961) is an American former professional football player who was a safety in the National Football League (NFL). He played college football for the Southern Mississippi Golden Eagles, earning second-team All-South Independent honors in 1982 and 1983. He was selected by the Miami Dolphins in the 11th round of the 1984 NFL draft.

After his retirement from the NFL Brown became a firefighter and is currently the assistant fire chief for Key Field Air National Guard Base at Meridian Regional Airport.
