= Dan Johnson (American football) =

American football player (born 1960)

No. 87
- Position: Tight end

Personal information
- Born: May 17, 1960 (age 66); Minneapolis, Minnesota, U.S.
- Listed height: 6 ft 3 in (1.91 m)
- Listed weight: 240 lb (109 kg)

Career information
- High school: Cooper (New Hope, Minnesota)
- College: Iowa State
- NFL draft: 1982: 7th round, 170th overall pick

Career history
- Miami Dolphins (1982–1988)

Career NFL statistics
- Receptions: 94
- Receiving yards: 1,012
- Receiving touchdowns: 16
- Stats at Pro Football Reference

Dan Jimmie Johnson (born May 17, 1960) is an American former professional football player who was a tight end for seven seasons with the Miami Dolphins of the National Football League (NFL). Before his NFL career, Jonson played college football for the Iowa State Cyclones. He did not play until his junior season, and caught only four passes that year (though they were good for 116 yards and two touchdowns). As a senior, Johnson caught 21 passes for 290 yards. He was later selected by Miami with their seventh round pick in the 1983 NFL draft.

Johnson told ESPN's John Barr on January 28, 2011, that he took about 1000 pain killers per month during his playing days, as a result of the numerous injuries and broken bones he suffered. Teammates nicknamed him "King of Pain" as a result of all the broken bones he had during his career. He was also the only player to catch a touchdown pass from Hall of Fame quarterback Dan Marino in Super Bowl XIX.
