= Ronnie Lee (American football) =

American football player (1956–2023)

No. 86, 70, 72, 63
- Positions: Tackle, tight end

Personal information
- Born: December 24, 1956; Pine Bluff, Arkansas, U.S.
- Died: March 26, 2023 (aged 66); Fort Worth, Texas, U.S.
- Listed height: 6 ft 3 in (1.91 m)
- Listed weight: 265 lb (120 kg)

Career information
- High school: John Tyler (TX)
- College: Baylor
- NFL draft: 1979: 3rd round, 65th overall pick

Career history
- Miami Dolphins (1979–1982); Atlanta Falcons (1983); Miami Dolphins (1984–1989); Seattle Seahawks (1990–1992)

Awards and highlights
- Second-team All-SWC (1977)

Career NFL statistics
- Receptions: 25
- Receiving yards: 167
- Receiving touchdowns: 3
- Stats at Pro Football Reference

Ronnie "Bo" Lee (December 24, 1956 – March 26, 2023) was an American professional football player who was an offensive tackle for 14 seasons in the National Football League (NFL), spending 10 seasons with the Miami Dolphins. He started his career as a tight end.

== Biography ==
Lee attended John Tyler High School (class of 1975; now known as Tyler High School) in Tyler, Texas. In high school he participated in football, basketball, track. In 2004, he was inducted into the Texas High School Hall of Fame.

He played college football for the Baylor Bears; and received a B.A. degree from Baylor University.

Lee died on March 26, 2023, in Fort Worth, Texas, at the age of 66.
