= Larry Lee (American football) =

American football player (born 1959)

No. 64, 63, 66, 68
- Position: Center

Personal information
- Born: September 10, 1959 (age 67); Dayton, Ohio, U.S.
- Listed height: 6 ft 2 in (1.88 m)
- Listed weight: 265 lb (120 kg)

Career information
- College: UCLA
- NFL draft: 1981: 5th round, 129th overall pick

Career history

Playing
- Detroit Lions (1981–1985); Miami Dolphins (1985-1986); Denver Broncos (1987–1988)

Operations
- Detroit Lions (1996–2000) Vice president of football operations; Orlando Guardians (2023) Director of player personnel

Awards and highlights
- First-team All-Pac-10 (1980)

Career NFL statistics
- Games played: 96
- Games started: 25
- Fumble recoveries: 2
- Stats at Pro Football Reference

Larry Dwayne "Big Sweet" Lee (born September 10, 1959) is an American former professional football player who was a center for eight seasons in the National Football League (NFL). He played college football for the UCLA Bruins.

== Biography ==
Lee was born in Dayton, Ohio, where he attended Nettie Lee Roth High School. After playing football at the University of California, Los Angeles, he was selected by the Detroit Lions in the fifth round of the 1981 NFL draft. He was an offensive lineman for the Lions, the Miami Dolphins and the Denver Broncos through 1988.

After he retired from the NFL, he later became the vice president of football operations for the Detroit Lions. Interested in funk music from an early age, Lee formed a band, Back in the Day, after his playing career was over.

He would briefly be the director of player personnel for the XFL's Orlando Guardians before the franchise folded in 2024 after their merger with the USFL.
