= Mark Brown (linebacker, born 1961) =

American football player (born 1961)

No. 51, 95, 52
- Position: Linebacker

Personal information
- Born: July 18, 1961 (age 65); Los Angeles, California, U.S.
- Listed height: 6 ft 2 in (1.88 m)
- Listed weight: 230 lb (104 kg)

Career information
- High school: Inglewood (Inglewood, California)
- College: Purdue
- NFL draft: 1983: 9th round, 250th overall pick

Career history
- Miami Dolphins (1983–1988); Detroit Lions (1989–1991)

Awards and highlights
- Second-team All-Big Ten (1982)

Career NFL statistics
- Sacks: 10.5
- Interceptions: 4
- Fumble recoveries: 8
- Stats at Pro Football Reference

Mark Anthony Brown (born July 18, 1961) is an American former professional football player who was a linebacker for nine seasons in the National Football League (NFL) for the Miami Dolphins from 1983 to 1988 and the Detroit Lions from 1989 to 1991. He played college football for the Purdue Boilermakers. He was selected by the Miami Dolphins in the ninth round (250th overall) of the 1983 NFL Draft.
