= Don McNeal =

American football player (born 1958)

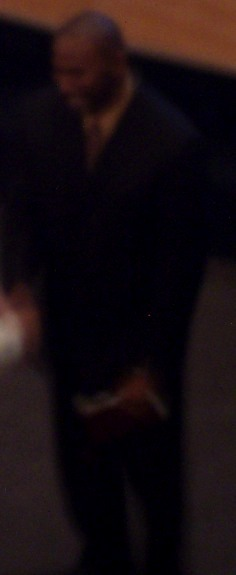

No. 28
- Position: Cornerback

Personal information
- Born: May 6, 1958 (age 68); Atmore, Alabama, U.S.
- Listed height: 5 ft 11 in (1.80 m)
- Listed weight: 192 lb (87 kg)

Career information
- High school: Escambia County (Atmore)
- College: Alabama
- NFL draft: 1980: 1st round, 21st overall pick

Career history
- Miami Dolphins (1980–1989)

Awards and highlights
- PFWA All-Rookie Team (1980); 2× National champion (1978, 1979); First-team All-American (1979); First-team All-SEC (1979)

Career NFL statistics
- Interceptions: 18
- Fumble recoveries: 5
- Touchdowns: 2
- Stats at Pro Football Reference

Donald McNeal (born May 6, 1958) is an American former professional football player who was a cornerback for the Miami Dolphins of the National Football League (NFL) in the 1980s.

McNeal was born and raised in Atmore, Alabama. He is a 1976 graduate of Escambia County (Alabama) High School where he was a star on the football team. He played college football for the Alabama Crimson Tide for the legendary coach Paul "Bear" Bryant. McNeal played on [Alabama's 1978 and 1979 national championship teams; he was Captain of the Team in 1979. In 1992, he was selected as a member of the University of Alabama All-Centennial Team.

McNeal's most famous play at Alabama was in the 1979 Sugar Bowl. In the final period, with Alabama leading Penn State 14–7, the Nittany Lions had the ball deep in Alabama territory first and goal at the 8-yard line. On second down, Penn State quarterback Chuck Fusina hit receiver Scott Fitzkee on a crossing route and Fitkee appeared headed for the goal line marker for a touchdown. However, McNeal was able to run down Fitzkee and force him out of bounds at the one-yard line, being knocked unconscious in the process. Two plays later on 4th down, Alabama linebacker Barry Krauss stopped Penn State running back Mike Guman short of the goal line in a now-famous goal-line stand.

The Miami Dolphins drafted McNeal 21st overall in the first round as a defensive back in 1980. McNeal played in two Super Bowls with the Dolphins: Super Bowl XVII in January 1983 and Super Bowl XIX in January 1985. He retired at the end of the 1989 season having played his entire pro career with the Dolphins.

McNeal was involved in one of the more famous plays in the annals of professional football, which took place in Super Bowl XVII. Late in the game with fourth down and inches to go, McNeal was unable to bring down Washington Redskins running back John Riggins, who rumbled 43 yards into the endzone for the game-winning touchdown. On the play, McNeal was assigned to shadow Redskins tight end Clint Didier, who went in motion before the snap. Suddenly, Didier reversed his motion, and McNeal slipped as he changed direction before regaining his footing. This slippage caused McNeal to start late in his pursuit of Riggins on the play after the snap, and while he got his hands on Riggins, he was unable get a firm grip as Riggins shed the tackle easily before scoring. Riggins' Run is the Redskins' "Greatest Moment of all time" as voted on by Redskin fans. This became not only a famous play but also a famous photograph as well.

Today, McNeal is active in the community with associations that assist youth and adults. He serves as a drug-rehab counselor, teacher, coach, lay pastor, board member, and is a frequent public speaker. He is a pastor at New Testament Baptist Church in South Florida and speaker for Power Talent. His life is further described in his autobiography Home Team Advantage: From the fields of rural Alabama to the pro football field of the Miami Dolphins.

On May 31, 2008, Don McNeal was inducted into the Alabama Sports Hall of Fame in Birmingham, Alabama.

== See also ==
- 1980 NFL draft
- Dade Christian School
