= Mike Charles =

American football player (born 1962)

No. 71, 95, 79
- Position: Nose tackle

Personal information
- Born: September 23, 1962 (age 64); Newark, New Jersey, U.S.
- Listed height: 6 ft 4 in (1.93 m)
- Listed weight: 292 lb (132 kg)

Career information
- High school: Central (Newark)
- College: Syracuse
- NFL draft: 1983: 2nd round, 55th overall pick

Career history
- Miami Dolphins (1983–1986); Tampa Bay Buccaneers (1987)*; San Diego Chargers (1987–1989); Los Angeles Raiders (1990); Los Angeles Rams (1991)
- * Offseason or practice squad member only

Awards and highlights
- First-team All-American (1982); First-team All-East (1982)

Career NFL statistics
- Sacks: 14
- Fumble recoveries: 1
- Interceptions: 1
- Stats at Pro Football Reference

Michael William Charles (born September 23, 1962), nicknamed "the Beast from the East", is an American former professional football player who was a nose tackle for nine seasons in the National Football League (NFL). He played college football for the Syracuse Orange.

Born and raised in Newark, New Jersey, Charles played prep football at Central High School.
