= George Little (defensive lineman) =

American football player (born 1963)

No. 99, 92
- Positions: Defensive end, nose tackle

Personal information
- Born: June 27, 1963 (age 63); Duquesne, Pennsylvania, U.S.
- Listed height: 6 ft 4 in (1.93 m)
- Listed weight: 278 lb (126 kg)

Career information
- High school: Duquesne
- College: Iowa (1981–1984)
- NFL draft: 1985: 3rd round, 65th overall pick

Career history
- Miami Dolphins (1985–1987); Montreal Machine (1991–1992)

Awards and highlights
- First-team All-Big Ten (1984)

Career NFL statistics
- Sacks: 5
- Fumble recoveries: 1
- Stats at Pro Football Reference

George Willard Little (born June 27, 1963) is an American former professional football player who was a defensive lineman for three seasons with the Miami Dolphins of the National Football League (NFL). He was selected by the Dolphins in the third round of the 1985 NFL draft after playing college football at the University of Iowa. Little was also a member of the Montreal Machine of the World League of American Football (WLAF).

== Early life and college ==
George Willard Little was born on June 27, 1963, in Duquesne, Pennsylvania. He attended Duquesne High School in Duquesne, Pennsylvania.

He was a four-year letterman for the Iowa Hawkeyes from 1981 to 1984. He was named first-team All-Big Ten by both the Associated Press and United Press International as a senior in 1984.

== Professional career ==
Little was selected by the Miami Dolphins in the third round, with the 65th overall pick, of the 1985 NFL draft. He officially signed with the team on July 18, 1985. He played in 14 games, starting three, for the Dolphins during his rookie year in 1985, recording one sack. He also appeared in two playoff games that season. Little started all 16 games for the Dolphins during the 1986 season, totaling four sacks and one fumble recovery. The Dolphins finished the year with an 8–8 record. He played in nine games during his final season with the Dolphins in 1987. On July 17, 1988, he was released by the Dolphins after he left the team.

Little appeared in four games the Montreal Machine of the World League of American Football in 1991. He was also a member of the Machine in 1992.
