= Robert Sowell =

American football player (1961–2015)

Profile
- Position: Defensive back

Personal information
- Born: June 23, 1961; Columbus, Ohio, U.S.
- Died: June 22, 2015 (aged 53); Tampa, Florida, U.S.

Career information
- College: Howard

Career history
- Miami Dolphins (1983–1987)
- Stats at Pro Football Reference

Robert Donnell Sowell Jr. (June 23, 1961 – June 22, 2015) was an American professional football player who was a defensive back in the National Football League (NFL) for the Miami Dolphins.

Sowell died June 22, 2015, of a heart attack. He was employed at UPS. He is one of at least 345 NFL players to be diagnosed after death with chronic traumatic encephalopathy (CTE), which is caused by repeated hits to the head.
