= Paul Hufford =

American football player

Paul Hufford was a college football player for the University of Iowa from 1982-1984. He was twice named All-Big Ten and was the inaugural Big Ten Defensive Lineman of the Year in 1984.

== Background ==
Paul Hufford was born in Keokuk, Iowa, but he moved to Mount Vernon, Iowa, before high school. Hufford was a standout athlete at Mount Vernon from 1976-1980. He lettered in four sports and won state championships in wrestling and track. Despite suffering a knee injury his senior year of high school, he earned a scholarship to the University of Iowa, where his older brothers, Joe and Mike Hufford, were football letterwinners.

== Iowa career ==
Paul Hufford earned football letters from 1982-1984. As a junior in 1983, he was an all-Big Ten selection at defensive tackle. Paul Hufford served as a captain of the 1984 Hawkeye football team, and Iowa finished with an 8-4-1 record and a victory in the 1984 Freedom Bowl. He was an all-Big Ten selection for the second time, and the Big Ten named him the first winner of its Defensive Lineman of the Year award after his senior season in 1984.
