= Jeff Dellenbach =

American football player (born 1963)

No. 65, 66, 67
- Positions: Center, tackle, guard

Personal information
- Born: February 14, 1963 (age 63); Wausau, Wisconsin, U.S.
- Listed height: 6 ft 6 in (1.98 m)
- Listed weight: 290 lb (132 kg)

Career information
- High school: Wausau East
- College: Wisconsin
- NFL draft: 1985: 4th round, 111th overall pick

Career history
- Miami Dolphins (1985–1994); New England Patriots (1995–1996); Green Bay Packers (1996–1998); Philadelphia Eagles (1999); Seattle Seahawks (2000)*
- * Offseason or practice squad member only

Awards and highlights
- Super Bowl champion (XXXI); Third-team All-American (1984); Big Ten Offensive Lineman of the Year (1984); First-team All-Big Ten (1984); Second-team All-Big Ten (1983)

Career NFL statistics
- Games Played: 211
- Games Started: 115
- Fumble recoveries: 4
- Stats at Pro Football Reference

Jeffrey Alan Dellenbach (born February 14, 1963) is an American former professional football player who was a center in the National Football League (NFL) for the Miami Dolphins, New England Patriots, Green Bay Packers, and the Philadelphia Eagles. He was a member of the Green Bay Packers when they won Super Bowl XXXI. Dellenbach played college football at the Wisconsin and was selected by the Dolphins in the fourth round of the 1985 NFL draft.

Dellenbach served as the head coach at Boca Raton (Fla.) High School, but resigned in May 2014 after just one season. "I'm pursuing other interests," Dellenbach wrote in a text message. In Dellenbach's only season as head coach, the Bobcats finished with a 4-6 record and missed the playoffs in 2013. Before arriving at Boca Raton, the 51-year-old spent two seasons at Plantation-American Heritage and won two district titles. In three seasons at Coconut Creek-North Broward Prep, Dellenbach posted a 22-11 record. He also served as an assistant offensive line coach for the Dolphins from 2003 to 2005.

In July 2016, Dellenbach was hired as the head football coach at Saint John Paul II Academy. (FL), replacing Willie Snead.
