= 2000 Miami Dolphins season =

35th season in franchise history; last playoff win

- Owner: Wayne Huizenga
- Head coach: Dave Wannstedt
- Offensive coordinator: Chan Gailey
- Defensive coordinator: Jim Bates
- Home stadium: Pro Player Stadium

Results
- Record: 11–5
- Division place: 1st AFC East
- Playoffs: Won Wild Card Playoffs (vs. Colts) 23–17 (OT); Lost Divisional Playoffs (at Raiders) 0–27
- Pro Bowlers: C Tim Ruddy; DE Trace Armstrong; DE Jason Taylor; LB Larry Izzo; LB Zach Thomas; CB Sam Madison; S Brock Marion

The 2000 Miami Dolphins season was the franchise's 31st season in the National Football League, the 35th overall and was their first under new head coach Dave Wannstedt who was named the fourth head coach in franchise history on January 16, 2000, the same day that Jimmy Johnson announced his retirement from coaching. For the first season since 1982, Dan Marino was not on the opening day roster, as he announced his retirement prior to the season. Believed by many as the greatest Miami Dolphin of all time, Marino led the Dolphins to ten playoff appearances, one of which ended in Super Bowl XIX, and is the winningest quarterback to have not won a Super Bowl. Jay Fiedler, who left the Jacksonville Jaguars, succeeded Marino as starting quarterback. Damon Huard remained a backup quarterback and started for Fiedler in one game during the season.

Although Marino was no longer on the team, the Dolphins hoped to improve from their 9–7 record in the previous season. The Dolphins began the season strong, with a 6–2 record halfway through. Both losses were by small margins. The second loss occurred during a road game dubbed the Monday Night Miracle, against the New York Jets, which scored 30 points in the fourth quarter and then defeated the Dolphins by a field goal in overtime. The Dolphins fared only slightly worse in the second half of the season, winning five games and losing three. The team finished with a record of 11–5, their best record since 1992. This was the Dolphins' fourth consecutive winning season and the first time the club won the AFC East title since 1994.

Additionally, this was the Dolphins' fourth consecutive season in which they advanced to the playoffs. In the Wild Card round, they defeated the Indianapolis Colts by a score of 23–17 in overtime. However, the Dolphins were shut out 27–0 by the Oakland Raiders in the Divisional round the following week. As of the 2025 season, this is the most recent time Miami has won a playoff game, making it 25 straight years that the Miami Dolphins have failed to win a playoff game. The Dolphins would not sweep the New England Patriots during the regular season again until 2021. Seven Dolphins players were selected for the Pro Bowl.

== Offseason ==
| Additions | Subtractions |
|---|---|
| QB Jay Fiedler (Jaguars) | QB Dan Marino (retirement) |
| RB Lamar Smith (Saints) | WR Yatil Green (Jets) |
| CB Terrance Shaw (Chargers) | S Shawn Wooden (Bears) |
| WR Leslie Shepherd (Browns) | CB Terrell Buckley (Broncos) |
| P Matt Turk (Redskins) | G Kevin Gogan (Chargers) |
| G Heath Irwin (Patriots) | LB O. J. Brigance (Ravens) |
| LB Scott Galyon (Giants) | T James Brown (Browns) |
| WR Jeff Ogden (Cowboys) | FB Stanley Pritchett (Eagles) |
| S Brian Walker (Seahawks) | TE Troy Drayton (Chiefs) |
| RB Thurman Thomas (Bills) | |
| WR Bert Emanuel (Buccaneers) | |

=== NFL draft ===
2000 Miami Dolphins draft
| Round | Pick | Player | Position | College | Notes |
| 2 | 53 | Todd Wade | OT | Ole Miss | |
| 3 | 84 | Ben Kelly | CB | Colorado | |
| 4 | 117 | Deon Dyer | RB | North Carolina | |
| 5 | 152 | Arturo Freeman | SS | South Carolina | |
| 6 | 167 | Ernest Grant | DT | Arkansas Pine-Bluff | |
| 7 | 232 | Jeff Harris | DB | Georgia | |
Made roster † Pro Football Hall of Fame * Made at least one Pro Bowl during career

=== Undrafted free agents ===
2000 undrafted free agents of note
| Player | Position | College |
|---|---|---|
| Rameel Connor | Defensive end | Illinois |
| Trent Gamble | Cornerback | Wyoming |
| Damian Gregory | Defensive tackle | Illinois State |
| Tommy Hendricks | Linebacker | Michigan |
| Steve Herndon | Guard | Georgia |
| Terrance Huston | Tight end | Butte College |
| Carlos Nuno | Tight end | BYU |
| Adewale Ogunleye | Defensive end | Indiana |
| Teddy Salters | Fullback | South Carolina |
| Damon Savage | Wide receiver | Tulsa |
| Kyle Shipley | Linebacker | Texas Tech |
| Jeff Snedegar | Linebacker | Kentucky |
| Quinton Spotwood | Wide receiver | Syracuse |
| Peter Sylvester | Fullback | Drake |
| Jay Taylor | Kicker | West Virginia |

== Staff ==
2000 Miami Dolphins staff
| Front office: Owner/chairman of the board – Wayne Huizenga; President/chief operating officer – Eddie Jones; Senior vice president of business operations – Bryan Wiedmeier; Vice president of player personnel – Rick Spielman; Director of college scouting – Ron Labadie; Director of pro personnel – George Paton; Assistant director of pro personnel – Tom Heckert, Sr.; Head coaches: Head coach – Dave Wannstedt; Offensive coaches: Offensive coordinator – Chan Gailey; Quarterbacks – Mike Shula; Running backs – Joel Collier; Wide receivers – Robert Ford; Tight ends – Pat Jones; Offensive line – Paul Boudreau; Offensive assistant – Judd Garrett | Defensive coaches: Defensive coordinator – Jim Bates; Defensive line – Clarence Brooks; Assistant defensive line/defensive assistant – Robert Nunn; Linebackers – Randy Shannon; Secondary – Mel Phillips; Defensive nickel package – Bill Lewis; Special teams coaches: Special teams – Mike Westhoff; Kicking – Doug Blevins; Strength and conditioning: Strength and conditioning – John Gamble; Assistant strength and conditioning – Brad Roll |

== Roster ==
2000 Miami Dolphins roster
| Quarterbacks (QB): 9 Jay Fiedler; 11 Damon Huard; 4 Mike Quinn; Running backs (RB): 21 Autry Denson KR; 33 Deon Dyer FB; 32 J. J. Johnson; 44 Rob Konrad FB; 26 Lamar Smith; Wide receivers (WR): 86 Oronde Gadsden; 80 Tony Martin; 81 O. J. McDuffie; 88 Jeff Ogden PR; 15 Damon Savage; 84 Leslie Shepherd PR; Tight ends (TE): 83 Hunter Goodwin; 46 Alonzo Mayes; 82 Jed Weaver | Offensive linemen (OL): 62 Jason Andersen C; 64 Anthony Cesario G; 63 Mark Dixon G; 65 Kevin Donnalley G; 66 Heath Irwin G; 61 Tim Ruddy C; 74 Brent Smith G/T; 71 Todd Wade T; 78 Richmond Webb T; Defensive linemen (DL): 93 Trace Armstrong DE; 95 Tim Bowens DT; 91 Lorenzo Bromell DE; 92 Daryl Gardener DT; 97 Ernest Grant DT; 94 Jermaine Haley DT; 79 Kenny Mixon DE/DT; 96 Rich Owens DE; 99 Jason Taylor DE | Linebackers (LB): 51 Tommy Hendricks MLB; 53 Larry Izzo OLB; 52 Robert Jones; 59 Derrick Rodgers OLB; 56 Twan Russell OLB; 54 Zach Thomas MLB; Defensive backs (DB): 27 Arturo Freeman SS; 42 Trent Gamble CB/S; 29 Sam Madison CB; 31 Brock Marion FS; 22 Terrance Shaw CB; 23 Patrick Surtain CB; 45 Brian Walker SS; 38 Kevin Williams FS/KR; 24 Jerry Wilson CB/S; Special teams (ST): 48 Brody Heffner-Liddiard LS; 10 Olindo Mare K; 1 Matt Turk P | Practice squad: 67 Ben Adams G; 18 Brian Alford WR; 19 Sherrod Gideon WR; 50 Nate Hemsley LB; 72 Dan Palmer (IR); 28 Vaughn Sanders RB; Reserve: 60 John Bock C (IR); 87 Bert Emanuel WR (IR); 58 Scott Galyon LB (IR); 75 Damian Gregory DT (IR); 30 Jeff Harris CB (IR); 25 Greg Jeffries CB (IR); 35 Ben Kelly CB (IR); 90 Adewale Ogunleye DE (NF-Inj.); 89 Ed Perry LS (IR); 85 Lamar Thomas WR (IR); 34 Thurman Thomas RB (IR); Rookies in italics 53 active, 12 reserve, 5 practice squad |

== Preseason ==
| Week | Date | Opponent | Result | Record | Venue | Recap |
|---|---|---|---|---|---|---|
| 1 | August 5 | at Pittsburgh Steelers | L 10–13 | 0–1 | Three Rivers Stadium | Recap |
| 2 | August 10 | Tampa Bay Buccaneers | W 15–13 | 1–1 | Pro Player Stadium | Recap |
| 3 | August 21 | Green Bay Packers | W 17–14 | 2–1 | Pro Player Stadium | Recap |
| 4 | August 25 | at New Orleans Saints | W 22–17 | 3–1 | Louisiana Superdome | Recap |

== Regular season ==
=== Schedule ===
| Week | Date | Opponent | Result | Record | Venue | Attendance |
|---|---|---|---|---|---|---|
| 1 | September 3 | Seattle Seahawks | **W** 23–0 | 1–0 | Pro Player Stadium | 72,949 |
| 2 | September 10 | at Minnesota Vikings | **L** 7–13 | 1–1 | Hubert H. Humphrey Metrodome | 64,112 |
| 3 | September 17 | Baltimore Ravens | **W** 19–6 | 2–1 | Pro Player Stadium | 73,464 |
| 4 | September 24 | **New England Patriots** | **W** 10–3 | 3–1 | Pro Player Stadium | 73,344 |
| 5 | October 1 | at Cincinnati Bengals | **W** 31–16 | 4–1 | Paul Brown Stadium | 61,535 |
| 6 | October 8 | **Buffalo Bills** | **W** 22–13 | 5–1 | Pro Player Stadium | 73,901 |
| 7 | Bye | | | | | |
| 8 | October 23 | at **New York Jets** | **L** 37–40 (OT) | 5–2 | Giants Stadium | 78,389 |
| 9 | October 29 | Green Bay Packers | **W** 28–20 | 6–2 | Pro Player Stadium | 73,740 |
| 10 | November 5 | at Detroit Lions | **W** 23–8 | 7–2 | Pontiac Silverdome | 77,813 |
| 11 | November 12 | at San Diego Chargers | **W** 17–7 | 8–2 | Qualcomm Stadium | 56,896 |
| 12 | November 19 | **New York Jets** | **L** 3–20 | 8–3 | Pro Player Stadium | 74,320 |
| 13 | November 26 | at **Indianapolis Colts** | **W** 17–14 | 9–3 | RCA Dome | 56,935 |
| 14 | December 3 | at **Buffalo Bills** | **W** 33–6 | 10–3 | Ralph Wilson Stadium | 73,002 |
| 15 | December 10 | Tampa Bay Buccaneers | **L** 13–16 | 10–4 | Pro Player Stadium | 74,307 |
| 16 | December 17 | **Indianapolis Colts** | **L** 13–20 | 10–5 | Pro Player Stadium | 73,884 |
| 17 | December 24 | at **New England Patriots** | **W** 27–24 | 11–5 | Foxboro Stadium | 60,292 |
Note: Intra-division opponents are in **bold** text.

=== Games summaries ===
==== Week 1: vs. Seattle Seahawks ====
Week One: Seattle Seahawks at Miami Dolphins – Game summary

| Quarter | 1 | 2 | 3 | 4 | Total |
|---|---|---|---|---|---|
| Seahawks | 0 | 0 | 0 | 0 | **0** |
| **Dolphins** | 10 | 13 | 0 | 0 | **23** |

at Pro Player Stadium, Miami Gardens, Florida

- Date: September 3
- Game time: 4:15 p.m. EDT
- Game weather: Sunny, 89 °F (32 °C)
- Game attendance: 72,949
- Referee: Ron Winter
- TV announcers (CBS): Kevin Harlan and Todd Blackledge
- Box score

Game information

**First quarter**

- MIA – Lamar Smith 4-yard run (Olindo Mare kick), 7:43. Dolphins 7–0.
- MIA – Olindo Mare 48-yard field goal, 1:22. Dolphins 10–0.

**Second quarter**

- MIA – Olindo Mare 25-yard field goal, 13:54. Dolphins 13–0.
- MIA – Olindo Mare 30-yard field goal, 10:51. Dolphins 16–0.
- MIA – Oronde Gadsden 16-yard pass from Jay Fiedler (Olindo Mare kick), 0:43. Dolphins 23–0.

**Third quarter**

- No scoring plays

**Fourth quarter**

- No scoring plays

**Top passers**

- SEA – Jon Kitna – 6/15, 54 yards, 4 INT
- MIA – Jay Fiedler – 15/24, 134 yards, TD

**Top rushers**

- SEA – Ricky Watters – 11 rushes, 59 yards
- MIA – Lamar Smith – 27 rushes, 145 yards, TD

**Top receivers**

- SEA – Ricky Watters – 3 receptions, 32 yards
- MIA – Leslie Shepherd – 3 receptions, 30 yards

Jay Fiedler started as quarterback in the first Miami Dolphins season opener without Dan Marino since 1983. Fiedler threw for 134 yards, completing 15 out of 24 passes, with no turnovers. In contrast, Seattle Seahawks quarterback Jon Kitna was intercepted four times and lost a fumble. Two of the four interceptions were caught by cornerback Sam Madison. Overall, Seattle had six turnovers. Kitna completed 6 out of 13 passes for only 54 yards, before being benched early in the third quarter due to poor performance and being replaced by Brock Huard, brother of Damon Huard. Dolphins running back Lamar Smith rushed for 145 yards. Winning 23–0, Miami caused Seattle to have their first shutout defeat since their 0–19 loss to the Los Angeles Raiders in October 1992. Miami opened the season with a record of 1–0 for the ninth consecutive year.

==== Week 2: at Minnesota Vikings ====
Week Two: Miami Dolphins at Minnesota Vikings – Game summary

| Quarter | 1 | 2 | 3 | 4 | Total |
|---|---|---|---|---|---|
| Dolphins | 0 | 0 | 0 | 7 | **7** |
| **Vikings** | 3 | 0 | 0 | 10 | **13** |

at Hubert H. Humphrey Metrodome, Minneapolis, Minnesota

- Date: September 10
- Game time: 1:00 p.m. EDT/12:00 p.m. CDT
- Game weather: None (played indoors)
- Game attendance: 64,112
- Referee: Gerald Austin
- TV announcers (CBS): Kevin Harlan, Sam Wyche, and Beasley Reece
- Box score

Game information

**First quarter**

- MIN – Gary Anderson 28-yard field goal, 2:46. Vikings 3–0.

**Second quarter**

- No scoring plays

**Third quarter**

- No scoring plays

**Fourth quarter**

- MIN – Gary Anderson 49-yard field goal, 11:30. Vikings 6–0.
- MIN – Randy Moss 15-yard pass from Daunte Culpepper (Gary Anderson kick), 1:56. Vikings 13–0.
- MIA – Thurman Thomas 2-yard pass from Jay Fiedler (Olindo Mare kick), 1:02. Vikings 13–7.

**Top passers**

- MIA – Jay Fiedler – 12/31, 175 yards, TD, INT
- MIN – Daunte Culpepper – 23/37, 355 yards, TD, 3 INT

**Top rushers**

- MIA – Lamar Smith – 11 rushes, 27 yards
- MIN – Robert Smith – 18 rushes, 72 yards

**Top receivers**

- MIA – Tony Martin – 6 receptions, 120 yards
- MIN – Cris Carter – 9 receptions, 168 yards

Miami traveled to Minneapolis for their first road game of the season against the Minnesota Vikings on September 10. Although Minnesota dominated Miami in terms of yardage, the game remained close throughout because mistakes by both teams kept them of out the opponent's end zone until the fourth quarter. Fiedler threw for 175 yards, completing only 12 of 31 passes and throwing an interception to Keith Thibodeaux in the third quarter. Vikings quarterback Daunte Culpepper threw for 355 yards and completed 23-for-37, but had three interceptions. Minnesota scored first during the first quarter with a field goal by Gary Anderson. However, neither team would record another score until the fourth quarter. After another field goal from Anderson and a touchdown pass from Culpepper to Randy Moss, the score was 13–0 in favor of Minnesota with 1:56 left in the game. Miami finally scored with a 2-yard touchdown pass from Fiedler to Thurman Thomas with barely a minute on the clock. After that, the Dolphins attempted an onside kick, but the ball was recovered by Orlando Thomas of the Vikings, effectively ending the game with a 13–7 win for Minnesota. Miami fell to 1–1.

==== Week 3: vs. Baltimore Ravens ====
Week Three: Baltimore Ravens at Miami Dolphins – Game summary

| Quarter | 1 | 2 | 3 | 4 | Total |
|---|---|---|---|---|---|
| Ravens | 0 | 0 | 3 | 3 | **6** |
| **Dolphins** | 3 | 3 | 7 | 6 | **19** |

at Pro Player Stadium, Miami Gardens, Florida

- Date: September 17
- Game time: 8:30 p.m. EDT
- Game weather: 80 °F (27 °C), winds of 13 mph (21 km/h) and steady rain
- Game attendance: 73,464
- Referee: Jeff Triplette
- TV announcers (ESPN): Mike Patrick, Joe Theismann, Paul Maguire, and Solomon Wilcots
- Box score

Game information

**First quarter**

- MIA – Olindo Mare 42-yard field goal, 4:55. Dolphins 3–0.

**Second quarter**

- MIA – Olindo Mare 41-yard field goal, 12:37. Dolphins 6–0.

**Third quarter**

- MIA – Lamar Smith 7-yard run (Olindo Mare kick), 11:47. Dolphins 13–0.
- BAL – Matt Stover 27-yard field goal, 3:13. Dolphins 13–3.

**Fourth quarter**

- MIA – Lamar Smith 8-yard pass from Jay Fiedler (Olindo Mare kick), 13:15. Dolphins 20–3.
- BAL – Matt Stover 33-yard field goal, 9:35. Dolphins 20–6.

**Top passers**

- BAL – Tony Banks – 19/31, 189 yards, INT
- MIA – Jay Fiedler – 11/16, 160 yards, TD, INT

**Top rushers**

- BAL – Jamal Lewis – 9 rushes, 76 yards
- MIA – Lamar Smith – 22 rushes, 63 yards, TD

**Top receivers**

- BAL – Shannon Sharpe – 5 receptions, 56 yards
- MIA – Lamar Smith – 3 receptions, 47 yards, TD

The Dolphins returned to Miami to play against the Baltimore Ravens on September 17. Fiedler threw 11-for-16 with 160 yards, including a touchdown pass and an interception. In the second half, all seven of his pass attempts were successful. Miami scored in each quarter, with a field goal from Olindo Mare in the first and second periods and a pair of touchdowns by Lamar Smith in the third and fourth quarters. Following the fourth quarter touchdown, Mare missed the extra point, only the second time in his 99 career attempts. On the Ravens team, quarterback Tony Banks threw for 189 yards with 19 out of 31 completions, but was sacked six times, intercepted once, and fumbled twice. Facing constant pressure from the Miami defense, Banks was often forced to throw short passes. Unable to reach the Miami end zone, Baltimore had to settle for two field goals from Matt Stover, one each in the third and fourth quarters. Although the Ravens had four more total yards than the Dolphins, Miami was able to win the game with a score of 19–6. The Dolphins improved to 2–1.

During halftime, a 19-minute ceremony was held to honor Dan Marino and retire number 13. The ceremony was begun by former quarterback Bob Griese and included video highlights of Marino's career with the Dolphins. Former head coach Don Shula inducted Marino into the Miami Dolphins Honor Roll. Miami Dolphins president Eddie Jones then presented a life-size statue of Marino on the grounds of Pro Player Stadium. As a result of the ceremony, more than 90 Dolphins alumni were in attendance at this game.

==== Week 4: vs. New England Patriots ====
Week Four: New England Patriots at Miami Dolphins – Game summary

| Quarter | 1 | 2 | 3 | 4 | Total |
|---|---|---|---|---|---|
| Patriots | 0 | 3 | 0 | 0 | **3** |
| **Dolphins** | 0 | 10 | 0 | 0 | **10** |

at Pro Player Stadium, Miami Gardens, Florida

- Date: September 24
- Game time: 1:00 p.m. EDT
- Game weather: 88 °F (31 °C), winds of 12 mph (19 km/h)
- Game attendance: 73,344
- Referee: Ed Hochuli
- TV announcers (CBS): Dick Enberg, Dan Dierdorf, and Bonnie Bernstein
- Box score

Game information

**First quarter**

- No scoring plays

**Second quarter**

- NE – Adam Vinatieri 40-yard field goal, 14:43. Patriots 3–0.
- MIA – Bert Emanuel 53-yard pass from Jay Fiedler (Olindo Mare kick), 11:30. Dolphins 7–3.
- NE – Olindo Mare 43-yard field goal, 0:07. Dolphins 10–3.

**Third quarter**

- No scoring plays

**Fourth quarter**

- No scoring plays

**Top passers**

- NE – Drew Bledsoe – 16/33, 161 yards, INT
- MIA – Jay Fiedler – 12/24, 153 yards, TD, 2 INT

**Top rushers**

- NE – Kevin Faulk – 21 rushes, 46 yards
- MIA – Lamar Smith – 20 rushes, 42 yards

**Top receivers**

- NE – Terry Glenn – 5 receptions, 65 yards
- MIA – Oronde Gadsden – 4 receptions, 60 yards

In the Dolphins first division rivalry game of the season, the New England Patriots traveled to play Miami at home on September 24. Neither team performed exceptionally well in terms of passing, rushing, or scoring. Fiedler completed only 50% of his passes, throwing 12-for-24 with 153 yards, which included one touchdown and two interceptions. The first interception, which occurred late in the first quarter, would allow New England to score first, with a field goal by Adam Vinatieri early in the second quarter. Patriots quarterback Drew Bledsoe had a slightly worse pass completion percentage than Fiedler and was 16-for-33 with 161 yards at the end of the game. With New England leading 3–0 at 14:43 left in the second quarter, Miami answered with a 53-yard touchdown pass from Fiedler to Bert Emanuel about three minutes later. The Dolphins reinforced their lead with a field goal from Mare with only seconds left in the second quarter. Neither Miami nor New England would score for the rest of the game. The Patriots attempted to force overtime or win the game with a touchdown at just 1:08 left in the fourth quarter. However, the pass from Bledsoe to Eric Bjornson on fourth down at the Miami 5-yard line was incomplete, turning the ball over to Miami with barely a minute on the clock. Thus, the Dolphins won 10–3 and improved to 3–1. The 2000 Miami Dolphins became the first NFL team to allow only one touchdown in the first four games and had only allowed 22 points by the end of this game.

==== Week 5: at Cincinnati Bengals ====
Week Five: Miami Dolphins at Cincinnati Bengals – Game summary

| Quarter | 1 | 2 | 3 | 4 | Total |
|---|---|---|---|---|---|
| **Dolphins** | 0 | 10 | 14 | 7 | **31** |
| Bengals | 10 | 3 | 0 | 3 | **16** |

at Paul Brown Stadium, Cincinnati, Ohio

- Date: October 1
- Game time: 4:05 p.m. EDT
- Game weather: 76 °F (24 °C), winds of 6 mph (9.7 km/h)
- Game attendance: 61,53
- Referee: Tom White
- TV announcers (CBS): Don Criqui & Steve Tasker

In week 5, Miami traveled to Cincinnati for a match-up against the Bengals on October 1. Fiedler passed 155 yards and completed 14 out of 21, but threw an interception. He also rushed for 45 yards. Bengal quarterback Akili Smith completed 20 out of 38 passes for 178 yards, while rushing for 43 yards. Additionally, Corey Dillon of the Bengals rushed for 110 yards. During the game, Cincinnati held Miami scoreless at 13–0 until near the end of the second quarter. The Dolphins proceeded to score five times from late in the second quarter to early in the fourth quarter, beginning with a field goal by Mare. As the clock ran out during the second quarter, Jason Taylor was able to recover a fumble by Cincinnati and return the ball for a touchdown, ending the first half with a score of 13–10 in favor of Cincinnati. Miami scored two touchdowns in the third quarter, the first an 18-yard rush by Lamar Smith and the second a 7-yard pass from Fiedler to Oronde Gadsden. The Dolphins scored another touchdown early in the fourth quarter, also a reception from Fiedler to Gadsden. About midway through the fourth quarter, the Bengals finally scored again with a field goal by Neil Rackers. Cincinnati was unable to stage a comeback, with Miami winning 31–16. The Dolphins record improved to 4–1.

==== Week 6: vs. Buffalo Bills ====
Week Six: Buffalo Bills at Miami Dolphins – Game summary

| Quarter | 1 | 2 | 3 | 4 | Total |
|---|---|---|---|---|---|
| Bills | 3 | 0 | 0 | 10 | **13** |
| **Dolphins** | 3 | 10 | 2 | 7 | **22** |

at Pro Player Stadium, Miami Gardens, Florida

- Date: October 8
- Game time: 1:02 p.m. EDT
- Game weather: 88° Partly Cloudy
- Game attendance: 73,901
- Referee: Bernie Kukar
- TV announcers (CBS): Dick Enberg, Dan Dierdorf, and Bonnie Bernstein

In week 6, the Miami Dolphins fought the Buffalo Bills at home on October 8. Thurman Thomas, who played for the Bills from 1988–1999, competed against his former team in this game. Fiedler completed 14 out of 24 passes with a total of 142 yards. Rob Johnson, who started this game as quarterback for the Bills, threw 178 yards and went only 11-for-26 on pass completions. Johnson was sacked five times, losing 40 yards. After the tendinitis in Johnson's throwing elbow flared up, he was replaced by Doug Flutie late in the fourth quarter. Flutie would complete three out of six passes for 44 yards, but he was sacked and intercepted once. After both teams each scored a field goal in the first quarter, Miami proceeded to score 12 points before Buffalo scored again in the fourth quarter. Buffalo narrowed the score to 15–13 in favor of Miami and attempted to take the lead late in the final period. However, Bills running back Sammy Morris fumbled on Buffalo's 16 yard line, with the ball being recovered by Madison and returned for a touchdown. Flutie being intercepted with 2:00 left on the clock prevented Buffalo from scoring again. Miami won 22–13 and improved to 5–1. This was the first regular season game since week 2 in 1998 that the Dolphins defeated the Bills.

==== Week 8: at New York Jets ====
Week Eight: Miami Dolphins at New York Jets – Game summary

| Quarter | 1 | 2 | 3 | 4 | OT | Total |
|---|---|---|---|---|---|---|
| Dolphins | 17 | 6 | 7 | 7 | 0 | **37** |
| **Jets** | 0 | 7 | 0 | 30 | 3 | **40** |

at Giants Stadium, East Rutherford, New Jersey

- Date: October 23, 2000
- Game time: 9:10 p.m. EDT
- Game weather: 51 °F (11 °C), Clear
- Game attendance: 78,389
- Referee: Walt Coleman
- TV announcers (ABC): Al Michaels, Dan Fouts, Dennis Miller, Melissa Stark, and Eric Dickerson
- Boxscore

Game information

**First quarter**

- MIA Olindo Mare 28 yard FG
- MIA Leslie Shepherd 42 yard pass from Fiedler (Mare kick)
- MIA Smith 68 yard rush (Mare kick)

**Second quarter**

- MIA Mare 42 yard FG
- NYJ Wayne Chrebet 10 yard pass from Testaverde (John Hall kick)
- MIA Mare 44 yard FG

**Third quarter**

- MIA Smith 3 yard rush (Mare kick)

**Fourth quarter**

- NYJ Laveranues Coles 30 yard pass from Testaverde (pass failed)
- NYJ Jermaine Wiggins 1 yard pass from Testaverde (Hall kick)
- NYJ Hall 34 yard FG
- NYJ Chrebet 24 yard pass from Testaverde (Hall kick)
- MIA Shepherd 46 yard pass from Fiedler (Mare kick)
- NYJ Jumbo Elliott 3 yard pass from Testaverde (Hall kick)

**Overtime**

- NYJ Hall 40 yard FG

**Top passers**

- MIA – Jay Fiedler – 16/35, 250 YDS, 2 TD, 3 INT
- NYJ – Vinny Testaverde – 36/59, 378 YDS, 5 TD, 3 INT

**Top rushers**

- MIA – Lamar Smith – 23 CAR, 155 YDS, 2 TD
- NYJ – Curtis Martin – 14 CAR, 65 YDS

**Top receivers**

- MIA – Oronde Gadsden – 7 REC, 119 YDS
- NYJ – Richie Anderson – 12 REC, 109 YDS

Coming off of bye week, the Dolphins traveled to the Giants Stadium to challenge division rival New York Jets on October 23, a Monday Night Football game. Fiedler passed for 250 yards, going 16-for-35 in completions. However, he was intercepted three times. Lamar Smith rushed for 155 yards on 23 attempts, one of which was 68 yards. Jets quarterback Vinny Testaverde completed 36 out of 59 completions for 378 yards, but was also intercepted three times. The Dolphins dominated the game for the first three quarters. The Jets did not obtain a first down until 8:04 in the second quarter, by which time the Dolphins already scored 20 points, including two touchdowns and two field goals. Late in the second quarter, New York score a touchdown with a pass from Testaverde to Wayne Chrebet, but Miami responded with another field goal as the first half of the game ended. With 15 seconds remaining in the third quarter, the Dolphins scored another touchdown.

At the beginning of the fourth quarter, Miami led New York 30–7. The Jets then proceeded to quickly close the 23-point deficit throughout the fourth quarter. By 3:55 left in the game, New York tied the game at 30–30, after scoring three touchdowns and a field goal, with a failed two-point conversion. About 22 seconds later, Miami scored a touchdown to re-take the lead. However, New York answered with another touchdown with 42 seconds left in regulation. Neither team scored again and the game went into overtime because of a 37–37 tie. In the fourth quarter, the Dolphins had only 1 first down versus 20 for the Jets, which was more than 15 other NFL teams had in their entire game in week 8. During overtime, Fiedler was intercepted about one minute in by Marcus Coleman, but Coleman fumbled and Miami recovered. However, Fiedler was soon intercepted again by Coleman; this time, the Dolphins were overturned. The Jets then drove the ball to Miami's 23 yard line. With 8:13 left in overtime, John Hall kicked a field goal, ending the game 40–37 in favor of New York. The Dolphins fell to 5–2.

==== Week 9: vs. Green Bay Packers ====
Week Nine: Green Bay Packers at Miami Dolphins – Game summary

| Quarter | 1 | 2 | 3 | 4 | Total |
|---|---|---|---|---|---|
| Packers | 10 | 7 | 0 | 3 | **20** |
| **Dolphins** | 0 | 7 | 21 | 0 | **28** |

at Pro Player Stadium, Miami Gardens, Florida

- Date: October 29
- Game time: 1:02 p.m. EDT/12:02 p.m. CDT
- Game weather: 81 °F (27 °C), winds of 13 mph (21 km/h)
- Game attendance: 73,740
- Referee: Gerald Austin
- TV announcers (Fox): Scott Graham, Brian Baldinger, and Drew Smith

Miami returned home to play against the Green Bay Packers on October 29. Fiedler went 16-for-25, throwing for 158 yards. Packers quarterback Brett Favre threw 194 yards, completing 21 out of 34 passes. The Packers scored first and by early in the second quarter, they had accumulated 17 points, with two touchdowns and a field goal. Green Bay did not allow Miami any points until 1:15 left in the second quarter, at which time the Dolphins scored a touchdown by a 1-yard rush from Fiedler. In the third quarter, Miami scored three touchdowns, one of which occurred shortly after a fake punt by Larry Izzo, while another was a punt return by Jeff Ogden. Holding Green Bay scoreless in the third quarter, Miami took the lead with a score of 28–17. The Packers scored again in the fourth quarter with a field goal to cut the Dolphins lead to 8 points. However, Green Bay was overturned twice on their final two possessions, first a Brock Marion interception of Favre and later Favre fumbled after being sacked by Trace Armstrong, with the ball being recovered by Kenny Mixon. The game ended with a score of 28–20 in favor of Miami. The Dolphins improved to 6–2.

==== Week 10: at Detroit Lions ====
Week Ten: Miami Dolphins at Detroit Lions – Game summary

| Quarter | 1 | 2 | 3 | 4 | Total |
|---|---|---|---|---|---|
| **Dolphins** | 14 | 3 | 6 | 0 | **23** |
| Lions | 0 | 0 | 0 | 8 | **8** |

at Pontiac Silverdome, Pontiac, Michigan

- Date: November 5
- Game time: 1:01 p.m. EDT
- Game weather: Played indoors, domed stadium
- Game attendance: 77,813
- Referee: Jeff Triplette
- TV announcers (CBS): Dick Enberg, Dan Dierdorf, and Bonnie Bernstein

Miami traveled to Detroit for a game against the Lions on November 5. Fiedler threw 112 yards on 13 out of 18 successful completions. Lions quarterback Charlie Batch went 8-for-16 on pass completions for 95 yards. However, Batch was injured in the third quarter and replaced by Stoney Case, who threw 7 out of 11 passes for 74 yards, with one interception. Miami dominated throughout the game. After Jason Hanson of the Lions kicked off, it was returned to about midfield by Autry Denson. Smith then ran for 46 yards, scoring a touchdown on the first play. Mare's onside kick was recovered by Terrance Shaw of the Dolphins. Miami capitalized on this and scored another touchdown, leaving Detroit losing 0–14 near the middle of the first quarter, having yet to make a single play. In the second and third quarters, Mare kicked a total of three field goals. The Dolphins held the Lions scoreless until early in the fourth quarter, when Detroit made a touchdown and a subsequent 2-point conversion. Neither team scored again in the fourth quarter, causing the game to end 23–8 in favor of Miami. The Dolphins improved to 7–2.

==== Week 11: at San Diego Chargers ====
Week Eleven: Miami Dolphins at San Diego Chargers – Game summary

| Quarter | 1 | 2 | 3 | 4 | Total |
|---|---|---|---|---|---|
| **Dolphins** | 7 | 7 | 3 | 0 | **17** |
| Chargers | 0 | 0 | 0 | 7 | **7** |

at Qualcomm Stadium, San Diego, California

- Date: November 12
- Game time: 4:05 p.m. EDT/1:05 p.m. PDT
- Game weather: 63 °F (17 °C), winds of 7 mph (11 km/h)
- Game attendance: 56,896
- Referee: Tony Corrente
- TV announcers (CBS): Gus Johnson & Brent Jones

Miami traveled to San Diego for a match-up against the Chargers on November 12. Fiedler threw 13–for–20 for 160 yards. Miami accumulated 84 rushing yards, with 69 yards from Lamar Smith. San Diego used three quarterbacks. The starter, Moses Moreno, completed 9 out of 21 passes for 67 yards and was intercepted twice, before leaving the game early in the third quarter due to injury. Ryan Leaf also went 9-for-21, throwing 92 yards and was intercepted once. He remained in the game until being injured late in the fourth quarter. Jim Harbaugh then played, throwing 2 out of 5 passes for 19 yards, as well as one interception. Thus, this game was the first since 1993 where three quarterbacks for a team threw interceptions in one game. The Dolphins led in scoring throughout the game, beginning with a touchdown as a result of a 2-yard run from Smith early in the first quarter. Smith rushed 6 yards for another touchdown early in the second quarter. Miami's defense limited San Diego to only 55 offense yards in the first half. In the third quarter, the Dolphins scored again with a field goal by Mare. The Chargers finally scored early in the fourth quarter with an 8-yard touchdown pass from Leaf to Fred McCrary. However, San Diego was unable to complete a comeback and the game ended with a 17–7 win for Miami. The Dolphins improved to 8–2.

==== Week 12: vs. New York Jets ====
Week Twelve: New York Jets at Miami Dolphins – Game summary

| Quarter | 1 | 2 | 3 | 4 | Total |
|---|---|---|---|---|---|
| **Jets** | 3 | 3 | 0 | 14 | **20** |
| Dolphins | 0 | 3 | 0 | 0 | **3** |

at Pro Player Stadium, Miami Gardens, Florida

- Date: November 19
- Game time: 4:05 p.m. EDT
- Game weather: 83 °F (28 °C), winds of 12 mph (19 km/h)
- Game attendance: 74,320
- Referee: Ron Winter
- TV announcers (CBS): Greg Gumbel, Phil Simms, and Armen Keteyian

After two weeks on the road, Miami returned to Pro Player Stadium for another game against the New York Jets on November 19. Just 12 seconds into the game, Fiedler was sacked by Mo Lewis and suffered an injury that forced him to head for the sideline. Fiedler was replaced by Damon Huard, who went 16–for–29 for 128 yards, but also threw three interceptions. Vinny Testaverde of the Jets performed similarly, completing 14 out of 29 passes for 113 yards and being intercepted twice. The contest remained close until the fourth quarter. In the first half, New York scored two field goals, while Miami had one, ending the half 6–3 for the Jets. Neither team gained points in the third quarter. About halfway through the fourth quarter, New York scored a touchdown with an 18-yard rush from Bernie Parmalee, a former Dolphin. With another rushing touchdown from Parmalee a few minutes later, the Jets sealed their victory with a score of 20–3. Prior to this game, Miami allowed only three touchdowns at home during the 2000 season. New York limited Miami to only 200 yards of offense. The Dolphins fell to 8–3.

==== Week 13: at Indianapolis Colts ====
Week Thirteen: Miami Dolphins at Indianapolis Colts – Game summary

| Quarter | 1 | 2 | 3 | 4 | Total |
|---|---|---|---|---|---|
| **Dolphins** | 0 | 3 | 7 | 7 | **17** |
| Colts | 7 | 0 | 0 | 7 | **14** |

at RCA Dome, Indianapolis, Indiana

- Date: November 26
- Game time: 4:15 p.m. CDT/5:15 p.m. CDT
- Game weather: Played indoors, domed stadium
- Game attendance: 56,935
- Referee: Bill Blum
- TV announcers (CBS): Greg Gumbel, Phil Simms, and Armen Keteyian

==== Week 14: at Buffalo Bills ====
Week Fourteen: Miami Dolphins at Buffalo Bills – Game summary

| Quarter | 1 | 2 | 3 | 4 | Total |
|---|---|---|---|---|---|
| **Dolphins** | 7 | 17 | 6 | 3 | **33** |
| Bills | 7 | 0 | 0 | 7 | **14** |

at Ralph Wilson Stadium, Orchard Park, New York

- Date: December 3
- Game time: 1:02 p.m. EDT
- Game weather: 27 °F (−3 °C), winds of 6 mph (9.7 km/h)
- Game attendance: 73,002
- Referee: Mike Carey
- TV announcers (CBS): Dick Enberg, Dan Dierdorf, and Bonnie Bernstein

==== Week 15: vs. Tampa Bay Buccaneers ====
Week Fifteen: Tampa Bay Buccaneers at Miami Dolphins – Game summary

| Quarter | 1 | 2 | 3 | 4 | Total |
|---|---|---|---|---|---|
| **Buccaneers** | 0 | 10 | 0 | 6 | **16** |
| Dolphins | 3 | 0 | 10 | 0 | **13** |

at Pro Player Stadium, Miami Gardens, Florida

- Date: December 10
- Game time: 1:02 p.m. EDT
- Game weather: 73 °F (23 °C), winds of 5 mph (8.0 km/h)
- Game attendance: 74,307
- Referee: Bill Carollo
- TV announcers (Fox): Dick Stockton, Matt Millen, and Pam Oliver

==== Week 16: vs. Indianapolis Colts ====
Week Sixteen: Indianapolis Colts at Miami Dolphins – Game summary

| Quarter | 1 | 2 | 3 | 4 | Total |
|---|---|---|---|---|---|
| **Colts** | 7 | 10 | 3 | 0 | **20** |
| Dolphins | 0 | 3 | 7 | 3 | **13** |

at Pro Player Stadium, Miami Gardens, Florida

- Date: December 17
- Game time: 4:16 p.m. EDT/3:16 p.m. CDT
- Game weather: 81 °F (27 °C), winds of 0 mph (0 km/h)
- Game attendance: 73,884
- Referee: Walt Anderson
- TV announcers (CBS): Greg Gumbel, Phil Simms, and Armen Keteyian

==== Week 17: at New England Patriots ====
Week Seventeen: Miami Dolphins at New England Patriots – Game summary

| Quarter | 1 | 2 | 3 | 4 | Total |
|---|---|---|---|---|---|
| **Dolphins** | 3 | 14 | 0 | 10 | **27** |
| Patriots | 7 | 14 | 3 | 0 | **24** |

at Foxboro Stadium, Foxborough, Massachusetts

- Date: December 24
- Game time: 1:02 p.m. EDT
- Game weather: 31 °F (−1 °C), winds of 10 mph (16 km/h)
- Game attendance: 60,292
- Referee: Johnny Grier
- TV announcers (CBS): Kevin Harlan & Daryl Johnston

In a bizarre season finale, the Dolphins thought the game had ended. However, referee Johnny Grier and his officiating crew reviewed the final play when Patriots quarterback Drew Bledsoe fumbled and threw an illegal forward pass that turned out to be an incompletion. 32 minutes later, Grier had interrupted Dave Wannstedt’s post game speech believing they had clinched the division sporting their division champion hats informed both teams that the teams must come back to the field for one more play. With Foxboro Stadium mostly empty with few fans left in the stands, players had to redress and some covered in bath towels. With 3 seconds left Patriots backup quarterback Michael Bishop threw a Hail Mary pass that fell incomplete, thus giving the Dolphins officially the AFC East title.

== Playoffs ==
| Round | Date | Opponent | Result | Record | Venue | Attendance |
|---|---|---|---|---|---|---|
| Wild Card | December 30 | Indianapolis Colts | W 23–17 | 1–0 | Pro Player Stadium | 73,193 |
| Divisional | January 6, 2001 | at Oakland Raiders | L 0–27 | 0–1 | Oakland-Alameda County Coliseum | 61,998 |

=== AFC Wild Card game vs. Indianapolis Colts ===
AFC Wildcard: Indianapolis Colts at Miami Dolphins – Game summary

| Quarter | 1 | 2 | 3 | 4 | OT | Total |
|---|---|---|---|---|---|---|
| Colts | 3 | 11 | 0 | 3 | 0 | 17 |
| Dolphins | 0 | 0 | 7 | 10 | 6 | 23 |

at Pro Player Stadium, Miami Gardens, Florida

- Date: December 30
- Game time: 12:30 p.m. EST
- Game weather: Clear, 61 °F (16 °C)
- Game attendance: 73,193
- Referee: Jeff Triplette
- TV announcers (ABC): Mike Patrick, Joe Theismann, Paul Maguire, and Solomon Wilcots
- Box score

Game information

First quarter

- IND – Mike Vanderjagt 32-yard field goal, 7:49. Colts 3–0.

Second quarter

- IND – Mike Vanderjagt 26-yard field goal, 9:33. Colts 6–0.
- IND – Jerome Pathon 17-yard pass from Peyton Manning (Peyton Manning pass to Ken Dilger), 7:47. Colts 14–0.

Third quarter

- MIA – Lamar Smith 2-yard run (Olindo Mare kick), 8:09. Colts 14–7.

Fourth quarter

- MIA – Olindo Mare 38-yard field goal, 10:23. Colts 14–10.
- IND – Mike Vanderjagt 50-yard field goal, 4:55. Colts 17–10.
- MIA – Jed Weaver 9-yard pass from Jay Fiedler (Olindo Mare kick), 0:34. Tied 17–17.

Overtime

- MIA – Lamar Smith 17-yard run, 3:34. Dolphins 23–17.

Top passers

- IND – Peyton Manning – 17/32, 194 yards, TD
- MIA – Jay Fiedler – 19/34, 185 yards, TD, 3 INT

Top rushers

- IND – Edgerrin James – 21 rushes, 107 yards
- MIA – Lamar Smith – 40 rushes, 209 yards, 2 TD

Top receivers

- IND – Jerome Pathon – 5 receptions, 69 yards, TD
- MIA – O. J. McDuffie – 4 receptions, 57 yards

Miami advanced to the playoffs after winning the AFC East title. In the Wildcard round they hosted their division rivals, the Indianapolis Colts. Fiedler threw for 185 yards, completing 19 passes from 34 attempts. However, he threw three interceptions, all in the first half of the game. Lamar Smith rushed for 209 yards on 40 attempts, a club record held until Ricky Williams rushed for 42 attempts against the Buffalo Bills during week 3 in 2003. The Dolphins won 23–17 in overtime on a 17-yard run by Smith. This is the most recent post-season win for the Miami Dolphins.

After the Detroit Lions won the 2023 NFC Wild Card Round against the Los Angeles Rams, the Dolphins now hold the longest playoff win drought in the NFL.

=== AFC Divisional game at Oakland Raiders ===
AFC Divisional: Miami Dolphins at Oakland Raiders – Game summary

| Quarter | 1 | 2 | 3 | 4 | Total |
|---|---|---|---|---|---|
| Dolphins | 0 | 0 | 0 | 0 | 0 |
| Raiders | 10 | 10 | 7 | 0 | 27 |

at Network Associates Coliseum, Oakland, California

- Date: January 6, 2001
- Game time: 4:00 p.m. EST/1:00 p.m. PST
- Game weather: Clear, 59 °F (15 °C)
- Game attendance: 61,998
- Referee: Phil Luckett
- TV announcers (CBS): Greg Gumbel, Phil Simms, and Armen Keteyian
- Box score

Game information

First quarter

- OAK – Tory James 90-yard interception return (Sebastian Janikowski kick), 11:36. Raiders 7–0.
- OAK – Sebastian Janikowski 36-yard field goal, 4:52. Raiders 10–0.

Second quarter

- OAK – Sebastian Janikowski 33-yard field goal, 8:36. Raiders 13–0.
- OAK – James Jett 6-yard pass from Rich Gannon (Sebastian Janikowski kick), 1:53. Raiders 20–0.

Third quarter

- OAK – Tyrone Wheatley 2-yard run (Sebastian Janikowski kick), 5:56. Raiders 27–0.

Fourth quarter

- No scoring plays

Top passers

- MIA – Jay Fiedler – 18/37, 176 yards, 3 INT
- OAK – Rich Gannon – 12/18, 143 yards, TD

Top rushers

- MIA – Autry Denson – 3 rushes, 12 yards
- OAK – Tyrone Wheatley – 19 rushes, 56 yards, TD

Top receivers

- MIA – O. J. McDuffie – 3 receptions, 43 yards
- OAK – Terry Kirby – 2 receptions, 35 yards

== Standings ==
AFC East
| | W | L | T | PCT | PF | PA | STK |
|---|---|---|---|---|---|---|---|
| ^{(3)} Miami Dolphins | 11 | 5 | 0 | .688 | 323 | 226 | W1 |
| ^{(6)} Indianapolis Colts | 10 | 6 | 0 | .625 | 429 | 326 | W3 |
| New York Jets | 9 | 7 | 0 | .563 | 321 | 321 | L3 |
| Buffalo Bills | 8 | 8 | 0 | .500 | 315 | 350 | W1 |
| New England Patriots | 5 | 11 | 0 | .313 | 276 | 338 | L1 |

== Awards and honors ==
- Trace Armstrong, AFC Pro Bowl Selection,
- Larry Izzo, AFC Pro Bowl Selection,
- Sam Madison, AFC Pro Bowl Selection,
- Brock Marion, AFC Pro Bowl Selection,
- Tim Ruddy, AFC Pro Bowl Selection,
- Jason Taylor, AFC Pro Bowl Selection,
- Zach Thomas, AFC Pro Bowl Selection,
