= 2001 Miami Dolphins season =

36th season in franchise history

- Owner: Wayne Huizenga
- Head coach: Dave Wannstedt
- Offensive coordinator: Chan Gailey
- Defensive coordinator: Jim Bates
- Home stadium: Pro Player Stadium

Results
- Record: 11–5
- Division place: 2nd AFC East
- Playoffs: Lost Wild Card Playoffs (vs. Ravens) 3–20
- Pro Bowlers: LB Zach Thomas; CB Sam Madison; C Tim Ruddy; DE Jason Taylor; FS Brock Marion

The 2001 Miami Dolphins season was the franchise's 32nd season in the National Football League and the 36th season in the AFC division, and their 2nd under the guidance of head coach Dave Wannstedt. The Miami Dolphins finished the season 2nd in the AFC East with a record of 11–5. Their season ended with a resounding 17-point home loss to the defending Super Bowl champions, the Baltimore Ravens, in the Wild Card round of the playoffs.

The Miami Dolphins ranked 8th in points scored and 11th in points allowed.

While the team finished with a respectable 11–5 record, they engineered embarrassing regular season losses to the New York Jets 24–0 in Miami and 21–17 in New Jersey after blowing a 17-point halftime lead; and blow out losses to the San Francisco 49ers 21–0 and St. Louis Rams 42–10. The Dolphins finished the season with a 20–3-home loss to the Baltimore Ravens. In these five losses, the Dolphins were -19 in turnover differential, turning the football over 20 times. For the season, the Dolphins gave away the football 41 times for a -13 total turnover differential. Starting quarterback Jay Fiedler led the team in turnovers by throwing 19 interceptions and fumbling six times.

The Dolphins did not return to the playoffs until 2008, and would not make back-to-back playoff appearances until 2022 and 2023. After the season, Harry Swayne retired.

== Offseason ==
Additions	Subtractions
QB Ray Lucas (Jets)	DE Trace Armstrong (Raiders)
S Scott McGarrahan (Packers)	QB Damon Huard (Patriots)
WR James McKnight (Cowboys)	LB Larry Izzo (Patriots)
G Todd Perry (Bears)	WR Tony Martin (Falcons)
	T Richmond Webb (Bengals)
	DE Rich Owens (Chiefs)
	WR Bert Emanuel (Patriots)
	G Kevin Donnalley (Panthers)
	CB Terrance Shaw (Patriots)
	LB Robert Jones (Redskins)

=== NFL draft ===
2001 Miami Dolphins draft
Round	Pick	Player	Position	College	Notes
1	26	Jamar Fletcher	Defensive Back	Wisconsin	
2	52	Chris Chambers *	Wide Receiver	Wisconsin	
3	85	Travis Minor	Running Back	Florida State	
3	88	Morlon Greenwood	Linebacker	Syracuse	
5	156	Shawn Draper	Tackle	Alabama	
6	164	Brandon Winey	Defensive Guard	LSU	
6	177	Josh Heupel	Quarterback	Oklahoma	
6	187	Otis Leverette	Defensive End	UAB	
6	188	Rick Crowell	Linebacker	Colorado State	
Made roster † Pro Football Hall of Fame * Made at least one Pro Bowl during career

=== Undrafted free agents ===
2001 undrafted free agents of note
Player	Position	College
Troy Andrew	Center	Duke
Devon Finn	Defensive End	Illinois State
Nick Sorensen	Safety	Virginia Tech

== Staff ==
2001 Miami Dolphins staff
Front office: Owner/chairman of the board – Wayne Huizenga; President/chief operating officer – Eddie Jones; Senior vice president of business operations – Bryan Wiedmeier; Vice president of player personnel – Rick Spielman; Director of college scouting – Ron Labadie; Director of pro personnel – George Paton; Assistant director of pro personnel – Tom Heckert, Sr.; Head coaches: Head coach – Dave Wannstedt; Offensive coaches: Offensive coordinator – Chan Gailey; Quarterbacks – Mike Shula; Running backs – Joel Collier; Wide receivers – Robert Ford; Tight ends – Pat Jones; Offensive line – Tony Wise; Offensive quality control – Judd Garrett	Defensive coaches: Defensive coordinator – Jim Bates; Defensive line – Clarence Brooks; Assistant defensive line/defensive quality control – Robert Nunn; Linebackers – Bob Sanders; Secondary – Mel Phillips; Defensive nickel package – Bill Lewis; Special teams coaches: Special teams – Keith Armstrong; Kicking – Doug Blevins; Strength and conditioning: Strength and conditioning – John Gamble; Assistant strength and conditioning – Brad Roll

== Roster ==
2001 Miami Dolphins roster
Quarterbacks (QB): 9 Jay Fiedler; 6 Ray Lucas; 8 Cade McNown; Running backs (RB): 33 Deon Dyer FB; 32 J. J. Johnson; 44 Rob Konrad FB; 34 Travis Minor; 26 Lamar Smith; Wide receivers (WR): 84 Chris Chambers; 86 Oronde Gadsden; 80 James McKnight; 88 Jeff Ogden PR; 87 Dedric Ward PR; Tight ends (TE): 46 Shawn Draper; 83 Hunter Goodwin; 82 Jed Weaver	Offensive linemen (OL): 65 Troy Andrew C; 64 Anthony Cesario G; 60 Spencer Folau T; 66 Heath Irwin C/G; 75 Todd Perry G; 61 Tim Ruddy C; 70 Harry Swayne T; 68 Andy Vincent G/T; 71 Todd Wade T; Defensive linemen (DL): 96 David Bowens DE; 95 Tim Bowens DT; 91 Lorenzo Bromell DE; 97 Ernest Grant DT; 94 Jermaine Haley DT; 79 Kenny Mixon DE; 90 Adewale Ogunleye DE; 98 Henry Taylor DT; 99 Jason Taylor DE	Linebackers (LB): 58 Scott Galyon OLB; 52 Morlon Greenwood OLB; 51 Tommy Hendricks MLB; 57 Corey Moore OLB; 56 Twan Russell OLB; 54 Zach Thomas MLB; Defensive backs (DB): 21 Terry Cousin CB; 24 Jamar Fletcher CB; 27 Arturo Freeman S; 40 Ray Green FS; 29 Sam Madison CB; 31 Brock Marion FS/KR; 41 Scott McGarrahan SS; 23 Patrick Surtain CB; 45 Brian Walker SS; 22 Shawn Wooden SS; Special teams (ST): 10 Olindo Mare K; 89 Ed Perry LS; 1 Matt Turk P	Practice squad: 17 Robert Baker WR; 15 Ronney Daniels WR; 72 Cornell Green T; 25 Jerry Westbrook RB; Reserve: 63 Mark Dixon G (IR); 42 Trent Gamble CB/S (IR); 92 Daryl Gardener DT (IR); -- Damian Gregory DT (NF-Inj.); 16 Albert Johnson WR (IR); 85 Alonzo Mayes TE (IR); 81 O. J. McDuffie WR (IR); 59 Derrick Rodgers LB (IR); 74 Brent Smith T (IR); 76 Marcus Spriggs T (IR); Rookies in italics 53 active, 10 reserve, 4 practice squad

== Preseason ==
Week	Date	Opponent	Result	Record	Venue
HOF	August 6	vs. St. Louis Rams	L 10–17	0–1	Fawcett Stadium (Canton, Ohio)
1	August 13	at Tampa Bay Buccaneers	W 17–14	1–1	Raymond James Stadium
2	August 18	San Diego Chargers	L 20–23 (OT)	1–2	Pro Player Stadium
3	August 25	at Green Bay Packers	L 12–17	1–3	Lambeau Field
4	August 31	Minnesota Vikings	L 7–20	1–4	Pro Player Stadium

== Regular season ==
=== Schedule ===
Week	Date	Opponent	Result	Record	Venue	Recap
1	September 9	at Tennessee Titans	**W** 31–23	1–0	Adelphia Coliseum	Recap
2 (Note: The Dolphins were originally scheduled to host the Buffalo Bills during Week 2 of the original NFL schedule (September 16) at Pro Player Stadium. However, due to the September 11 attacks, the game was rescheduled to Week 17.)	September 23	Oakland Raiders	**W** 18–15	2–0	Pro Player Stadium	Recap
3	September 30	at St. Louis Rams	**L** 10–42	2–1	Trans World Dome	Recap
4	October 7	**New England Patriots**	**W** 30–10	3–1	Pro Player Stadium	Recap
5	October 14	at **New York Jets**	**L** 17–21	3–2	Giants Stadium	Recap
6	Bye					
7	October 28	at Seattle Seahawks	**W** 24–20	4–2	Husky Stadium	Recap
8	November 4	Carolina Panthers	**W** 23–6	5–2	Pro Player Stadium	Recap
9	November 11	at **Indianapolis Colts**	**W** 27–24	6–2	RCA Dome	Recap
10	November 18	**New York Jets**	**L** 0–24	6–3	Pro Player Stadium	Recap
11	November 25	at **Buffalo Bills**	**W** 34–27	7–3	Ralph Wilson Stadium	Recap
12	December 2	Denver Broncos	**W** 21–10	8–3	Pro Player Stadium	Recap
13	December 10	**Indianapolis Colts**	**W** 41–6	9–3	Pro Player Stadium	Recap
14	December 16	at San Francisco 49ers	**L** 0–21	9–4	3Com Park at Candlestick Point	Recap
15	December 22	at **New England Patriots**	**L** 13–20	9–5	Foxboro Stadium	Recap
16	December 30	Atlanta Falcons	**W** 21–14	10–5	Pro Player Stadium	Recap
17	January 6	**Buffalo Bills**	**W** 34–7	11–5	Pro Player Stadium	Recap
Note: Intra-division opponents are in **bold** text.

=== Standings ===
AFC East
	W	L	T	PCT	PF	PA	STK
^{(2)} New England Patriots	11	5	0	.688	371	272	W6
^{(4)} Miami Dolphins	11	5	0	.688	344	290	W2
^{(6)} New York Jets	10	6	0	.625	308	295	W1
Indianapolis Colts	6	10	0	.375	413	486	W1
Buffalo Bills	3	13	0	.188	265	420	L1

== Playoffs ==
=== Wild Card vs Ravens ===
Round	Date	Opponent (seed)	Result	Record	Venue	Source
Wild Card	January 13, 2002	Baltimore Ravens (5)	L 3–20	0–1	Pro Player Stadium	

==== AFC: Baltimore Ravens 20, Miami Dolphins 3 ====
Game summary

Quarter	1	2	3	4	Total
Ravens	0	7	7	6	20
Dolphins	3	0	0	0	3

at Pro Player Stadium, Miami, Florida

- Game time: 4:00 p.m. EST
- Game weather: 73 °F (23 °C), partly sunny
- Game attendance: 72,251
- Referee: Mike Carey
- TV announcers (CBS): Greg Gumbel (play-by-play), Phil Simms (color commentator), Armen Keteyian, and Bonnie Bernstein (sideline reporters)

Game information
- Scoring
  - MIA – field goal Mare 33 MIA 3–0
  - BAL – Allen 4 run (Stover kick) BAL 7–3
  - BAL – Taylor 4 pass from Grbac (Stover kick) BAL 14–3
  - BAL – field goal Stover 35 BAL 17–3
  - BAL – field goal Stover 40 BAL 20–3

The Ravens recorded 222 rushing yards, while limiting the Dolphins to 151 total yards and nine first downs, while forcing three turnovers and three sacks. Baltimore running back Terry Allen ran for 109 yards and a touchdown, while quarterback Elvis Grbac completed 12 of 18 passes for 133 yards and a touchdown. Throughout the day, the Dolphins were unable to move the ball on the ground. Running backs Travis Minor and Lamar Smith were held to a combined total of 20 yards on 11 carries, while quarterback Jay Fiedler ended up as the leading rusher with 16 yards. In contrast, the Ravens called 50 running plays, gained 222 rushing yards, and held the ball for 38 minutes.

The Dolphins' only score was Olindo Mare's 33-yard field goal just two minutes into the game, after linebacker Tommy Hendricks recovered a fumble from Baltimore's Jermaine Lewis on the opening kickoff. In the second quarter, the Ravens finished a 17-play, 90-yard drive with a 4-yard touchdown run from Allen to take a 7–3 lead. Baltimore later had a chance to increase their lead before halftime when linebacker Peter Boulware recovered Minor's fumble on the Dolphins 41-yard line, but their ensuing drive ended without points when Matt Stover missed a 40-yard field goal attempt on the last play of the half.

Later in the game, Grbac led the Ravens on a 99-yard scoring drive, featuring a 45-yard completion to Travis Taylor on third down and 1. Taylor finished the drive with a 4-yard touchdown catch to give the Ravens a 14–3 lead with 1:20 left in the third quarter.

Early in the final quarter, Boulware forced a fumble while sacking Fiedler that Ravens lineman Sam Adams recovered on the Dolphins 37-yard line, leading to Stover's 35-yard field goal with 11:26 left in the game. The Dolphins responded with a drive to the Ravens 41. On first and 10, Fiedler's 40-yard pass to James McKnight at the Ravens 5-yard line bounced off the receiver's shoulder and was intercepted by defensive back Duane Starks, who returned the ball 26 yards to the 28-yard line. Baltimore's offense subsequently drove 50 yards and took 6:30 off the clock, including five carries by Jason Brookins for 36 yards, setting up Stover's second field goal to put the game away.
