= Monday Night Miracle (American football) =

Notable 2000 NFL game

The Monday Night Miracle
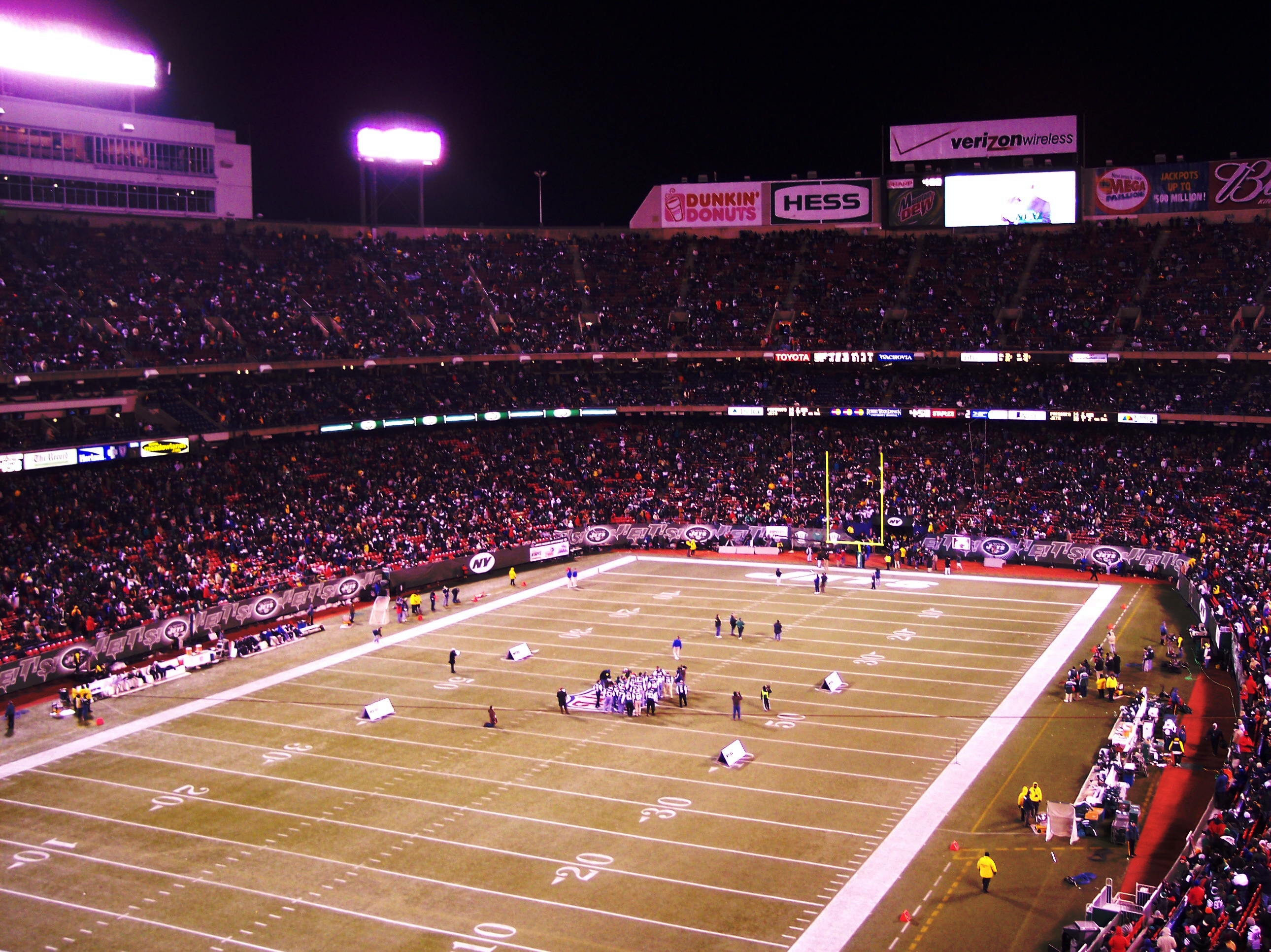
- Giants Stadium, the site of the game.
Miami Dolphins (5–1)	New York Jets (5–1)
37	40
Head coach: Dave Wannstedt	Head coach: Al Groh
	1	2	3	4	OT	Total
MIA	17	6	7	7	0	37
NYJ	0	7	0	30	3	40
- Date: October 23, 2000
- Stadium: Giants Stadium; East Rutherford, New Jersey
- Favorite: Jets by 3
- Referee: Walt Coleman

TV in the United States
- Network: ABC
- Announcers: Al Michaels, Dan Fouts, and Dennis Miller

The Monday Night Miracle was an NFL Monday night game between the New York Jets and Miami Dolphins played at Giants Stadium on October 23, 2000. The Jets scored 30 points in the fourth quarter, twice tying the score, and sending the game into overtime, where they defeated the Dolphins, 40–37.

== Background ==
Like their 1994 showdown at Giants Stadium which was made famous by Dan Marino's "fake spike", this game was for first place in the AFC East as both teams entered the game with a 5–1 record. Unlike the 1994 game which featured the Jets failing to hold a double-digit (18) lead in the second half, it was the Dolphins who failed to hold the lead.

The game is notable for having the second largest fourth-quarter comeback in NFL history and the largest comeback in Jets history. It was also voted the greatest game televised on ABC's Monday Night Football, along with being #5 on NFL Top Ten's Top Ten Comebacks.

At the end of the third quarter with the score 30–7 in Miami's favor, Jets broadcaster Howard David announced, "And with a whole quarter to go, this game is over."

== Jets comeback ==
The Jets proceeded to stage a furious rally in the fourth quarter, scoring 23 unanswered points to tie the game at 30. They scored three touchdowns and a field goal, but a two-point conversion attempt to Curtis Martin was stopped. On the Dolphins' first play from scrimmage after the game was tied, they took the lead on a long touchdown pass by Jay Fiedler to Leslie Shepherd. However, the Jets still managed to drive downfield and tie the game. One of the key plays was a 4th down catch at the Dolphins 2-yard line by Richie Anderson as he caught the ball despite a head-on hit by Zach Thomas and Dolphins defensive back Jerry Wilson. Improbably, the tying touchdown was caught by offensive tackle John "Jumbo" Elliott, playing as a tackle-eligible. After Elliott caught the touchdown pass, Dennis Miller remarked how opposing defenses, "couldn't keep him down forever." In the overtime Fiedler was intercepted by Marcus Coleman but Coleman was hit by Thurman Thomas and fumbled the ball back to the Dolphins. Several plays later, Coleman intercepted Fiedler again and this time held on. An eventual Vinny Testaverde pass to Wayne Chrebet put the Jets in field goal range, and a pass that was nearly intercepted by Jerry Wilson hit the ground first, nullifying the turnover. Jets kicker John Hall then won the game with a field goal with 8:13 remaining in the extra session.

Actor Arnold Schwarzenegger, while visiting the ABC broadcast booth to promote his upcoming film The 6th Day, said after halftime,

Wayne Chrebet is going to pull it off. I think as usual the Jets are going to come from behind, you will see... I think the Dolphins have to be terminated.

The Monday night game for the Jets was in between Games 2 and 3 of the All New York (Yankees vs. Mets) 2000 World Series. The series overshadowed the game. In fact, the crowd broke out into "Let's Go Yankees" chants countered by "Let's Go Mets" chants during the third quarter.

== Starting lineups ==
Hall of Fame‡

Miami	Position		New York Jets
Offense
Leslie Shepherd	WR		Dedric Ward
Richmond Webb	LT		Jason Fabini
John Bock	LG		Kerry Jenkins
Tim Ruddy	C		Kevin Mawae‡
Kevin Donnalley	RG		Randy Thomas
Todd Wade	RT		Ryan Young
Hunter Goodwin	TE		Fred Baxter
Oronde Gadsden	WR		Wayne Chrebet
Jay Fiedler	QB		Vinny Testaverde
Rob Konrad	FB	WR	Laveranues Coles
Lamar Smith	RB		Curtis Martin‡
Defense
Kenny Mixon	LE	DE	Rick Lyle
Tim Bowens	LT	DT	Jason Ferguson
Jermaine Haley	RT	DE	Shane Burton
Jason Taylor‡	RE	LB	Mo Lewis
Zach Thomas‡	MLB	LB	Bryan Cox
Jerry Wilson	WLB	LB	Marvin Jones
Robert Jones	SLB	LB	James Farrior
Patrick Surtain	LCB	CB	Aaron Glenn
Sam Madison	RCB	CB	Marcus Coleman
Brock Marion	FS		Kevin Williams
Brian Walker	SS		Victor Green

== Game summary ==
2000 Week 8: Miami Dolphins at New York Jets

Quarter	1	2	3	4	OT	Total
Dolphins	17	6	7	7	0	37
Jets	0	7	0	30	3	40

at Giants Stadium, East Rutherford, New Jersey

- Date: October 23, 2000
- Game time: 9:10 p.m. EDT
- Game weather: 51 °F (28 °C), Clear
- Game attendance: 78,389
- Referee: Walt Coleman
- TV announcers (ABC): Al Michaels, Dan Fouts, and Dennis Miller
- Boxscore, Game Book

Scoring summary

Quarter	Time	Drive			Team	Scoring information	Score	
Quarter	Time	Plays	Yards	TOP	Team	Scoring information	MIA	NYJ
1	7:22	14	63	7:38	MIA	28-yard field goal by Olindo Mare	3	0
1	5:03	2	69	0:51	MIA	Leslie Shepherd 42-yard touchdown reception from Jay Fiedler, Mare kick good	10	0
1	3:09	1	68	0:13	MIA	Lamar Smith 68-yard touchdown run, Mare kick good	17	0
2	12:57	5	17	1:57	MIA	42-yard field goal by Mare	20	0
2	0:53	5	53	0:51	NYJ	Wayne Chrebet 10-yard touchdown reception from Vinny Testaverde, John Hall kick good	20	7
2	0:02	5	34	0:51	MIA	44-yard field goal by Mare	23	7
3	0:12	5	35	3:04	MIA	Smith 3-yard touchdown run, Mare kick good	30	7
4	13:49	4	75	1:23	NYJ	Laveranues Coles 30-yard touchdown reception from Testaverde, 2-point pass failed	30	13
4	9:51	7	63	2:11	NYJ	Jermaine Wiggins 1-yard touchdown reception from Testaverde, Hall kick good	30	20
4	5:43	10	64	1:52	NYJ	34-yard field goal by Hall	30	23
4	3:55	3	39	0:33	NYJ	Chrebet 24-yard touchdown reception from Testaverde, Hall kick good	30	30
4	3:33	1	46	0:22	MIA	Shepherd 46-yard touchdown reception from Fiedler, Mare kick good	37	30
4	0:42	9	57	2:51	NYJ	Jumbo Elliott 3-yard touchdown reception from Testaverde, Hall kick good	37	37
OT	8:13	7	43	2:53	NYJ	40-yard field goal by Hall	37	40
"TOP" = time of possession. For other American football terms, see Glossary of American football.							37	40

== Final statistics ==
=== Statistical comparison ===
	Miami Dolphins	New York Jets
First downs	20	31
Third down efficiency	5/17	4/16
Fourth down efficiency	0/0	1/2
Total yards	433	455
Passing yards	235	376
Passing – completions/attempts	16/35	36/59
Rushing yards	198	79
Rushing attempts	38	22
Yards per rush	5.2	3.6
Penalties–yards	13–95	3–30
Sacks against–yards	2–15	1–2
Fumbles–lost	0–0	1–1
Interceptions thrown	3	3
Time of possession	36:11	30:36

=== Individual stats ===
Dolphins Passing
Player	C/ATT^{*}	Yds	TD	INT
Jay Fiedler	16/35	250	2	3
Dolphins Rushing
Player	Car^{a}	Yds	TD	LG^{b}
Lamar Smith	23	155	2	68
Jay Fiedler	4	24	0	15
Rob Konrad	5	11	0	3
J. J. Johnson	2	6	0	3
Thurman Thomas	4	2	0	4
Dolphins Receiving
Player	Rec^{c}	Yds	TD	LG^{b}
Oronde Gadsden	7	119	0	29
Leslie Shepherd	3	94	2	46
Hunter Goodwin	2	13	0	8
Lamar Smith	2	9	0	12
Thurman Thomas	1	8	0	8
Rob Konrad	1	7	0	7

Jets Passing
	C/ATT^{*}	Yds	TD	INT
Vinny Testaverde	36/59	378	5	3
Jets Rushing
Player	Car^{a}	Yds	TD	LG^{b}
Curtis Martin	14	65	0	34
Vinny Testaverde	1	7	0	7
Dwight Stone	1	4	0	4
Richie Anderson	6	3	0	4
Jets Receiving
Player	Rec^{c}	Yds	TD	LG^{b}
Richie Anderson	12	109	0	19
Curtis Martin	8	72	0	15
Wayne Chrebet	6	104	2	28
Laveranues Coles	4	55	1	30
Dedric Ward	3	40	0	27
Jumbo Elliott	1	3	1	3
Jermaine Wiggins	1	1	1	1
Jerald Sowell	1	-6	0	-6

^{*}Completions/Attempts ^{a}Carries ^{b}Longest play ^{c}Receptions

== Officials ==
- Referee: Walt Coleman (#65)
- Umpire: Undrey Wash (#96)
- Head linesman: John Schleyer (#21)
- Line judge: Dave Anderson (#81)
- Field judge: Scott Steenson (#88)
- Side judge: Bill Spyksma (#12)
- Back judge: Ron Spitler (#119)

== Aftermath ==
Despite the Jets winning the game, they would finish the season with a 9-7 record 3rd in the AFC East. The Dolphins however would win the AFC East with an 11-5 record but forcing them to enter the playoffs as a wild card team as they couldn't catch the two teams with the best record in the AFC, the 12-4 Oakland Raiders and the team with the best record in football that year, the 13-3 Tennessee Titans. The Dolphins won their first playoff game 23-17 against Indianapolis in the Wild Card round in overtime (their last playoff win to date) but lost next week against Oakland 27-0 in the divisional round.

== See also ==
- Dolphins–Jets rivalry
- The Monday Night Miracle (ice hockey)
