= Brock Marion =

American football player (born 1970)

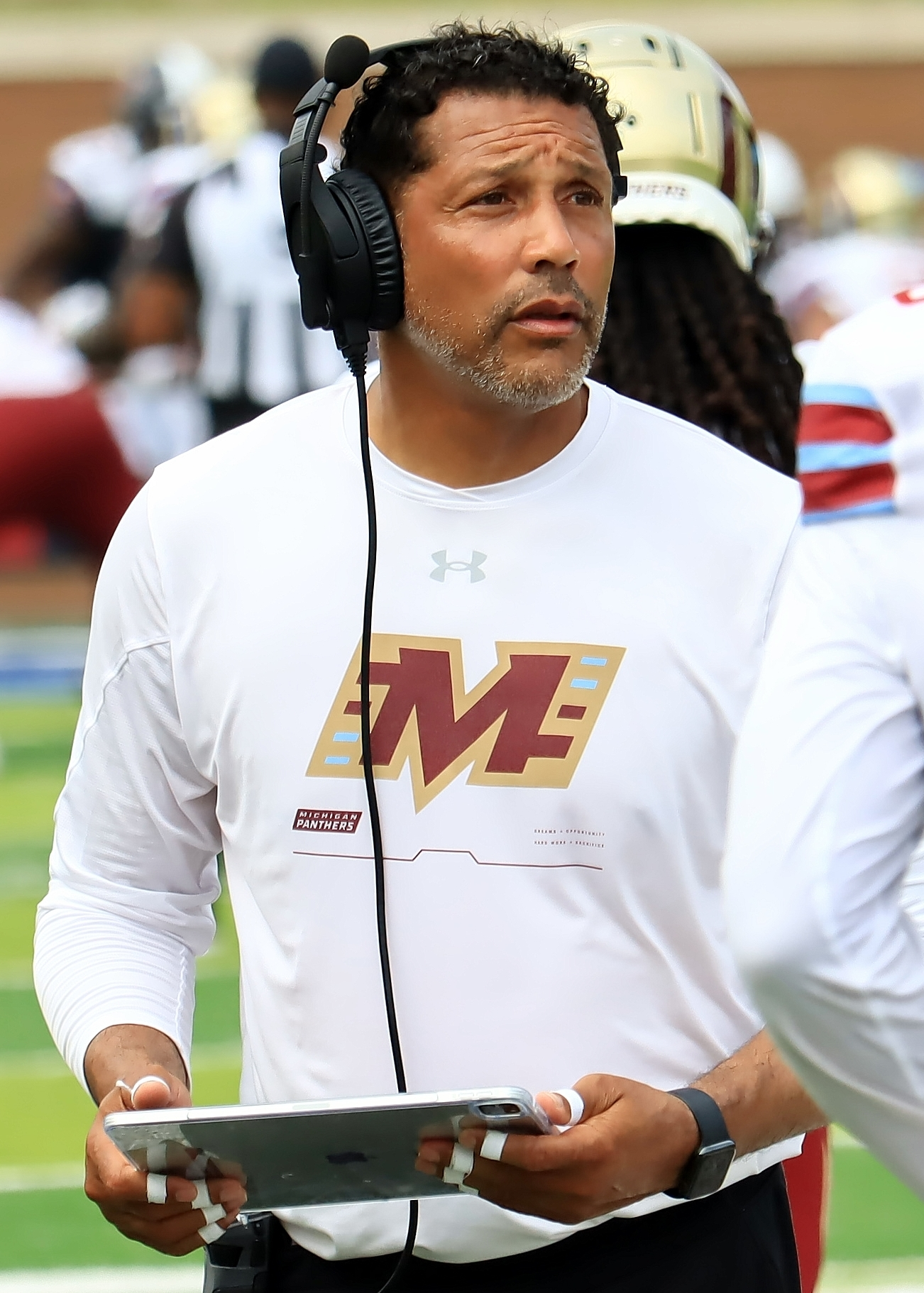
- Marion with the Michigan Panthers in 2024

The Villages Charter High School
- Title: Defensive backs coach

Personal information
- Born: June 11, 1970 (age 56); Bakersfield, California, U.S.
- Listed height: 5 ft 11 in (1.80 m)
- Listed weight: 193 lb (88 kg)

Career information
- High school: West (Bakersfield)
- College: Nevada
- NFL draft: 1993: 7th round, 196th overall pick

Career history

Playing
- Dallas Cowboys (1993–1997); Miami Dolphins (1998–2003); Detroit Lions (2004)

Coaching
- Memphis Showboats (2023) Defensive quality control & defensive backs coach; Michigan Panthers (2023) Defensive backs coach

Awards and highlights
- 2× Super Bowl champion (XXVIII, XXX); 3× Pro Bowl (2000, 2002, 2003); NFL interception return yards leader (2001); NFL kickoff return yards leader (1999); 2× All-Big Sky (1990, 1991); All-Big West (1992)

Career NFL statistics
- Tackles: 912
- Interceptions: 31
- Sacks: 2.0
- Forced fumbles: 7
- Touchdowns: 3
- Stats at Pro Football Reference

Brock Elliot Marion (born June 11, 1970) is an American former professional football player who was the defensive backs coach for the Michigan Panthers of the United Football League (UFL). He was a free safety for 12 seasons in the National Football League (NFL). After playing college football for the Nevada Wolf Pack, he was chosen in the seventh round of the 1993 NFL draft by the Dallas Cowboys. He also played for the Miami Dolphins and the Detroit Lions, and was a three-time Pro Bowler with the Dolphins. He is the son of NFL player Jerry Marion.

== Early life ==
Marion played high school football at West High School, where as a senior he received All-State honor after leading the state with 13 interceptions. He also lettered in basketball and track.

He accepted a scholarship to attend the University of Nevada. He became a four-year starter, leading the secondary in tackles each year. He played cornerback during his first three years, before moving to strong safety as a senior. He finished his career with 303 tackles, 13 interceptions and deflected an additional 44 passes.

After his sophomore season, the University of Nevada earned three consecutive conference titles. In those years he was named All-Big Sky and All-Big West.

In 2006, he was inducted into the Nevada Athletics Hall of Fame.

== Professional career ==
=== Dallas Cowboys ===
The Dallas Cowboys selected Marion in the seventh round (196th overall) of the 1993 NFL draft. He was the 16th safety drafted and the second safety the Cowboys drafted in 1993, following third round pick (84th overall) Mike Middleton.

==== 1993 season ====
Throughout training camp, Marion competed against James Washington and Mike Middleton for a role ad the primary backup safety following the departure of Ray Horton. Head coach Jimmy Johnson named Marion a backup safety to begin the regular season, behind starters Thomas Everett and Darren Woodson.

On September 6, 1993, Marion made his professional regular season debut in the Dallas Cowboys' season-opener at the Washington Redskins as they lost 16—35. On November 25, 1993, Marion made two solo tackles, a pass deflection, and made his first career interception on a pass attempt by Steve DeBerg to Keith Jackson as they lost 16—14 to the Miami Dolphins. In Week 12, he set a season-high with five solo tackles during a 14—27 loss at the Atlanta Falcons. He finished his rookie season with 16 combined tackles (11 solo), three pass deflections, two forced fumbles, and one interception in 15 games and zero starts. He made 19 combined tackles (17 solo) on special teams.

The Dallas Cowboys finished the 1993 NFL season first in the NFC East with a 12—4 record to clinch a playoff berth and earn a first round bye. On January 16, 1994, Marion appeared in the first playoff game of his career and recorded one solo tackle as the Cowboys defeated the Green Bay Packers 27—17 in the Divisional Round. The following week, the Cowboys defeated the San Francisco 49ers 38—21 in the NFC Championship Game to advance to the Super Bowl. The Dallas Cowboys would go on to defeat the Buffalo Bills 30—13 to win Super Bowl XXVIII. He earned the first Super Bowl ring of his career.

==== 1994 season ====
On March 29, 1994, Cowboys' head coach Jimmy Johnson officially announced his resignation. On March 31, 1994, the Dallas Cowboys hired Barry Switzer as their new head coach. Throughout training camp, Marion competed against James Washington to be the starting free safety following the departure of Thomas Everett. He began the regular season as a backup behind starting tandem James Washington and Darren Woodson.

On September 11, 1994, Marion earned his first career start as a nickelback and recorded five combined tackles (three solo) as the Cowboys defeated the Houston Oilers 20—17. The following week, he set a season-high with seven combined tackles (five solo) during a 17—20 overtime loss to the Detroit Lions in Week 3. On December 10, 1994, Marion exited in the second quarter of a 14—19 loss to the Cleveland Browns after injuring his ribs. He sustained a fracture to his ribs and subsequently remained inactive for the last two games (Weeks 16—17) of the season. He finished the season with 29 combined tackles (21 solo), three pass deflections, one interception, a forced fumble, and one sack in 14 games and one start. He also recorded 23 combined tackles (18 solo) on special teams.

==== 1995 season ====
On January 25, 1995, defensive backs coach Dave Campo was promoted to defensive coordinator following the departure of Butch Davis. During training camp, Marion competed against Scott Case for the job as the starting free safety after James Washington signed with the Washington Redskins as a free agent. Head coach Barry Switzer named Marion the starting free safety to begin the season, pairing him with strong safety Darren Woodson.

On September 4, 1995, Marion earned his first career start as a cornerback in the Cowboys' season-opener at the New York Giants and recorded five solo tackles, made one pass deflection, and intercepted Dave Brown's pass attempt to wide receiver Mike Sherrard in their 35—0 victory. In Week 12, he recorded five solo tackles, set a career-high with seven pass deflections, and intercepted a pass attempt by Jeff Hostetler to Rocket Ismail during a 34—21 win at the Oakland Raiders. In Week 16, he recorded nine combined tackles (six solo), made one pass deflection, and intercepted Dave Brown's first pass attempt of the game as the Cowboys defeated the New York Giants 20—21. On December 25, 1995, Marion set a season-high with 11 solo tackles, made one pass deflection, and intercepted a pass thrown by Dave Krieg and returned it 32—yards to score the first touchdown of his career as the Cowboys routed the Arizona Cardinals 37—13. He started in all 16 games for the first time in his career and finished the season with 114 combined tackles (74 solo), 13 pass deflections, a forced fumble, and scored a touchdown. His six interceptions set a career-high and tied cornerback Larry Brown for the team lead in interceptions.

The Dallas Cowboys finished the 1995 NFL season first in the NFC East with a 12—4 record to clinch a playoff berth and earn a first round bye. On January 7, 1996, Marion earned his first career start in the playoffs in the NFC Divisional Round and recorded two combined tackles (one solo) and one pass break-up as the Cowboys routed the Philadelphia Eagles 30—13. The following week, the Cowboys defeated the Green Bay Packers 38—27 in the NFC Championship Game. On January 28, 1996, Marion started in Super Bowl XXX and made nine combined tackles (six solo), one pass deflection, and sealed their 27—17 victory against the Pittsburgh Steelers by intercepting Neil O'Donnell with three seconds remaining.

==== 1996 season ====
He returned as the starting free safety alongside Darren Woodson in 1996. In Week 4, Marion set a season-high with 12 solo tackles during a 7—10 loss at the Buffalo Bills. On November 10, 1996, Marion recorded five solo tackles, but suffered a shoulder injury on the final play as the Cowboys won in overtime 20—17 at the San Francisco 49ers. He fractured his left shoulder blade and joint and was expected to miss the next three games. On December 25, 1996, the Dallas Cowboys placed Marion on injured reserve for the rest of the season and he subsequently remained inactive for the last six games (Weeks 12—17) of the season. He finished 1996 NFL season and made 77 combined tackles (44 solo) and five pass deflections in ten games and ten starts.

==== 1997 season ====
On March 18, 1997, the Baltimore Ravens and Marion agreed to a four—year, $8.20 million contract that included an initial signing bonus of $2.00 million. The Ravens had Marion undergo a routine physical that free agents commonly went through before signing a contract. During the physical, Marion underwent a CT scan, revealing that his fractured left scapula had not fully healed. Following the discovery, the Ravens nullified their contract and offered a new restructured contract that was declined by Marion. On March 20, 1997, the Ravens held a press conference that was originally intended to announce Marion's signing.

On April 7, 1997, the 1997 Dallas Cowboys re-signed Marion to a one—year, $461,000 contract. Head coach Barry Switzer retained Marion and Darren Woodson as the starting safeties to begin the season. In Week 9, Marion recorded 13 combined tackles (10 solo) and set a season-high with two pass deflections during a 12—13 loss at the Philadelphia Eagles. On November 23, 1997, Marion set a season-high with 11 solo tackles (13 combined) and made one pass deflection during a 17—45 loss at the Green Bay Packers. He started in all 16 games throughout the 1997 NFL season and set a career-high with 123 combined tackles (103 solo) and made eight pass deflections.

=== Miami Dolphins ===
==== 1998 season ====
On March 4, 1998, the Miami Dolphins signed Marion to a three—year, $8.10 million contract that included an initial signing bonus of $3.30 million. He was reunited with head coach Jimmy Johnson.

Entering training camp, Marion was slated to takeover as the starting free safety following the departures of Corey Harris and George Teague. Head coach Jimmy Johnson named Marion the starting free safety to begin the season, pairing him with strong safety Shawn Wooden. Wooden would suffer a torn ACL in Week 2, placing him on injured reserve for the majority of the season. Marion was paired with Calvin Jackson for 15 games. In Week 15, Marion set a season-high with 12 combined tackles (seven solo) as the Dolphins lost 16—21 to the New York Jets. He started in all 16 games and finished the season with 97 combined tackles (70 solo) and three pass deflections. For the third consecutive season, Marion did not have an interception.

The Miami Dolphins finished the 1998 NFL season second in the AFC East with a 10—6 record, earning a Wild-card position. On January 2, 1999, Marion made six combined tackles (three solo), one pass deflection, recovered a fumble, and intercepted a pass Doug Flutie attempted to throw to Andre Reed as the Dolphins defeated the Buffalo Bills 24—17. On January 9, 1999, Marion led the game with 12 combined tackles (eight solo) and had one pass break-up during a 3—38 loss at the Denver Broncos in the AFC Divisional Round.

==== 1999 season ====
Head coach Jimmy Johnson retained Marion as the starting free safety to start the season, alongside strong safety Calvin Jackson. On September 19, 1999, Marion made five solo tackles, a pass deflection, and secured a 16—19 victory against the Arizona Cardinals by intercepting Jake Plummer's pass attempt to wide receiver Rob Moore with 26 seconds remaining. In Week 8, Marion set a season-high with nine combined tackles (six solo) during a 16—9 victory at the Oakland Raiders. On November 21, 1999, Marion made one tackle, a pass deflection, and intercepted a pass attempt by Drew Bledsoe as the Dolphins defeated the New England Patriots 27—17. He started in all 16 games for the third consecutive season and finished with 87 combined tackles (57 solo), six pass deflections, and two interceptions. Marion also held the role as the Dolphins' primary kick returner and finished with 62 kick returns for 1,524 yards. He led the league for the most kick return yards in 1999 and set a franchise record.

The Miami Dolphins finished the 1999 NFL season third in the AFC East with a 9—7 record to earn a Wild-Card position in the playoffs. On January 9, 2000, Marion recorded six combined tackles (four solo), made one pass deflection, and intercepted Jon Kitna's pass attempt to Sean Dawkins as the Dolphins won the AFC Wild-Card Game 20—17 at the Seattle Seahawks. The following week, the Dolphins lost in the AFC Divisional Round as the Jacksonville Jaguars demolished the Dolphins 7—62.

==== 2000 season ====
On January 16, 2000, the Miami Dolphins announced the resignation of head coach Jimmy Johnson. They subsequently announced their decision to promote assistant head coach Dave Wannstedt to head coach. Defensive coordinator Jim Bates retained Marion as the starting free safety and paired him with strong safety Brian Walker. In Week 8, he set a season-high with 12 combined (seven solo) during a 37—42 loss at the New York Jets. On October 29, 2000, Marion made seven combined tackles (six solo), one pass deflection, and secured a 20—28 victory against the Green Bay Packers by intercepting a pass Brett Favre attempted to throw to Bill Schroeder with 3:11 remaining in the fourth quarter. On November 26, 2000, Marion made eight combined tackles (six solo), two pass deflections, and led the Dolphins to a 17—14 comeback victory at the Indianapolis Colts by intercepting Peyton Manning's pass with 3:06 remaining in the fourth quarter as they were losing 10—14. He started in all 16 games and finished with 86 combined tackles (62 solo), 11 pass deflections, and five interceptions. His performance earned him a selection to the 2001 Pro Bowl, marking the first Pro Bowl selection of his career.

==== 2001 season ====
On June 9, 2001, the Miami Dolphins re-signed Marion to a two—year, $4 million contract. Head coach Dave Wannstedt retained Marion and Brian Walker as the starting safeties to begin the regular season.

On December 10, 2001, Marion recorded eight combined tackles (five solo), made two pass deflections, forced a fumble, made a fumble recovery, and set a season-high with two interceptions on passes by Peyton Manning as the Dolphins routed the Indianapolis Colts 6—41. The following week, he set a season-high with 12 combined tackles (11 solo) during a 0—21 loss at the San Francisco 49ers in Week 14. On December 30, 2001, Marion made seven combined tackles (six solo), a pass deflection, and intercepted Chris Chandler's pass attempt to Alge Crumpler and returned it for a 26—yard touchdown during a 14—21 win against the Atlanta Falcons. On January 6, 2002, Marion made five tackles, one pass deflection, and returned an interception thrown by Travis Brown for 100—yards and scored a touchdown as the Dolphins routed the Buffalo Bills 7—34. He finished the 2001 NFL season with 70 combined tackles (46 solo), seven pass deflections, five interceptions, and scored two touchdowns in 15 games and 15 starts. He was named as an alternate for the 2002 Pro Bowl.

==== 2002 season ====
On February 28, 2002, the Miami Dolphins released Marion due to their salary cap. On March 8, 2002, the Miami Dolphins signed Marion to a five—year, $12.50 million contract that included an initial signing bonus of $2.50 million. He entered training camp slated as the de facto starting free safety. Head coach Dave Wannstedt named Marion the starting free safety to begin the season and paired him with strong safety Arturo Freeman following the departure of Brian Walker. Marion led a secondary that also included cornerbacks Sam Madison and Patrick Surtain. On September 8, 2002, Marion started in the Dolphins' home-opener against the Detroit Lions and made seven combined tackles (six solo), one pass deflection, and intercepted a pass attempt by Mike McMahon as they won 21—49. In Week 6, he set a season-high with nine combined tackles (seven solo) during a 24—22 victory at the Denver Broncos. On December 29, 2002, Marion recorded nine combined tackles (seven solo), set a season-high with two pass deflections, and intercepted Tom Brady's pass attempt to Troy Brown during a 24—27 overtime loss at the New England Patriots. He started in all 16 games throughout the 2002 NFL season and finished with 93 combined tackles (64 solo), ten pass deflections, and five interceptions. He was voted to the 2003 Pro Bowl.

==== 2003 season ====
Head coach Dave Wannstedt retained Marion as the starting free safety to begin the season and paired him with strong safety Sammy Knight. On September 21, 2003, Marion recorded three tackles, set a season-high with two pass deflections, and intercepted Drew Bledsoe's pass attempt to Eric Moulds as the Dolphins defeated the Buffalo Bills 7—17. In Week 6, he set a season-high with nine combined tackles (six solo) during a 24—10 victory at the Jacksonville Jaguars. On November 23, 2003, Marion made five combined tackles (four solo), one pass deflection, and secured a 23—24 victory against the Washington Redskins by intercepting Tim Hasselbeck's pass attempt to wide receiver Laveranues Coles with 3:03 remaining in the game. He started in all 16 games throughout the 2003 NFL season and finished with 81 combined tackles (57 solo), seven pass deflections, and three interceptions. His performance earned him a selection to the 2004 Pro Bowl, marking his third Pro Bowl selection.

He left ranking third on the franchise career list in kickoff returns (107), kickoff return yards (2,517) and kickoff return average (23.5).

==== 2004 season ====
On February 28, 2004, the Miami Dolphins released Marion due to salary cap concerns.

=== Detroit Lions ===
Marion signed with the Detroit Lions in 2004, making 66 tackles, 3 interceptions, and starting 16 games. He was cut in a salary cap move on April 25, 2005 and was replaced with Terrence Holt as the new starter at free safety.

He retired with 676 career tackles, two quarterback sacks, 31 interceptions for 537 yards and three touchdowns. He also returned 123 kickoffs for 2,951 yards. He is the oldest player with an interception return of 100+ yards (31 years, 209 days).

== Coaching career ==
On February 21, 2024, Marion was hired by the Michigan Panthers of the United Football League as their defensive backs coach.

== Personal life ==
Brock Marion was born on June 11, 1970, in Bakersfield, California.

In 2004, Marion was arrested in South Florida for insurance fraud. He accepted fraudulent checks in the amounts of $54,247.94 from State Farm Insurance.

In 2008, Marion moved to Portland, Oregon where he opened two franchise locations of the National Personal Trainer Institute.

In 2013, Marion became the head coach for the football team at St. John Lutheran High School in Ocala, Florida.

His father Jerry Marion played wide receiver for one year with the Pittsburgh Steelers.
