= Lorenzo Bromell =

American football player (born 1975)

No. 91, 95
- Position: Defensive end

Personal information
- Born: September 23, 1975 (age 51); Georgetown, South Carolina, U.S.
- Listed height: 6 ft 6 in (1.98 m)
- Listed weight: 260 lb (118 kg)

Career information
- College: Georgia Military; Clemson
- NFL draft: 1998: 4th round, 102nd overall pick

Career history
- Miami Dolphins (1998–2001); Minnesota Vikings (2002); Oakland Raiders (2003); New York Giants (2004)

Awards and highlights
- Second-team All-ACC (1997)

Career NFL statistics
- Tackles: 139
- Sacks: 27.5
- Forced fumbles: 4
- Stats at Pro Football Reference

Lorenzo Alexis Bromell (/broʊˈmɛl/; born September 23, 1975) is an American former professional football player who was a defensive end in the National Football League (NFL). He played college football for the Clemson Tigers and was selected in the fourth round of the 1998 NFL draft with the 102nd overall pick. Bromell began his professional career with the Miami Dolphins and played for the Minnesota Vikings, Oakland Raiders and New York Giants. During his career, Bromell compiled 27.5 sacks. He is best remembered for breaking Peyton Manning's jaw during a game in 2001.

== NFL career statistics ==
Legend
**Bold**	Career high

=== Regular season ===
Year	Team	Games		Tackles				Interceptions				Fumbles			
Year	Team	GP	GS	Comb	Solo	Ast	Sck	Int	Yds	TD	Lng	FF	FR	Yds	TD
1998	MIA	14	0	23	16	7	**8.0**	0	0	0	0	1	**1**	0	0
1999	MIA	15	1	23	15	8	5.0	0	0	0	0	0	0	0	0
2000	MIA	8	0	14	13	1	2.0	0	0	0	0	0	0	0	0
2001	MIA	16	1	**32**	20	**12**	6.5	0	0	0	0	**3**	0	0	0
2002	MIN	16	1	30	**22**	8	4.0	0	0	0	0	0	0	0	0
2003	OAK	6	4	14	8	6	2.0	0	0	0	0	0	0	0	0
2004	NYG	2	0	3	3	0	0.0	0	0	0	0	0	0	0	0
		77	7	139	97	42	27.5	0	0	0	0	4	1	0	0

=== Playoffs ===
Year	Team	Games		Tackles				Interceptions				Fumbles			
Year	Team	GP	GS	Comb	Solo	Ast	Sck	Int	Yds	TD	Lng	FF	FR	Yds	TD
1998	MIA	2	0	0	0	0	0.0	0	0	0	0	0	0	0	0
1999	MIA	2	0	0	0	0	0.0	0	0	0	0	0	0	0	0
2000	MIA	2	0	**3**	**3**	0	**1.0**	0	0	0	0	**1**	0	0	0
2001	MIA	1	0	1	1	0	0.0	0	0	0	0	0	0	0	0
		7	0	4	4	0	1.0	0	0	0	0	1	0	0	0
