= Scott Galyon =

American football player (born 1974)

No. 52, 58
- Position: Linebacker

Personal information
- Born: March 23, 1974 (age 52); Seymour, Tennessee, U.S.
- Listed height: 6 ft 2 in (1.88 m)
- Listed weight: 238 lb (108 kg)

Career information
- College: Tennessee
- NFL draft: 1996: 6th round, 182nd overall pick

Career history
- New York Giants (1996–1999); Miami Dolphins (2000–2002)

Awards and highlights
- Second-team All-SEC (1995)

Career NFL statistics
- Tackles: 142
- Sacks: 6
- Forced fumbles: 4
- Stats at Pro Football Reference

Scott Galyon (born March 23, 1974) is an American former National Football League (NFL) linebacker who grew up in Seymour, Tennessee where he played football, basketball and baseball at Seymour High School. He signed a football scholarship to play linebacker for the University of Tennessee during his senior year.

Galyon played four years at the University of Tennessee where he led the team in tackles during his junior and senior years and was voted team captain during his senior season. Galyon was selected by the New York Giants in the sixth round with the 182nd overall pick in the 1996 NFL draft. He played for seven years in the NFL, four with the Giants and three with the Miami Dolphins. He moved back to Tennessee in 2003 and worked as a volunteer coach with his high school team, the Seymour Eagles, before eventually working with Novartis Pharmaceuticals for three years. He joined the FCA staff from December 2007 – 2017.

Galyon is the former head football coach at Seymour High School.

== NFL career statistics ==
Legend
**Bold**	Career high

=== Regular season ===
Year	Team	Games		Tackles				Interceptions				Fumbles			
Year	Team	GP	GS	Comb	Solo	Ast	Sck	Int	Yds	TD	Lng	FF	FR	Yds	TD
1996	NYG	16	0	2	2	0	0.0	0	0	0	0	0	0	0	0
1997	NYG	16	0	**37**	**31**	6	**3.0**	0	0	0	0	**2**	0	0	0
1998	NYG	10	1	24	19	5	1.0	0	0	0	0	**2**	**1**	0	0
1999	NYG	16	0	35	25	**10**	1.0	0	0	0	0	0	0	0	0
2000	MIA	6	1	13	12	1	0.0	0	0	0	0	0	0	0	0
2001	MIA	16	2	20	10	**10**	1.0	**1**	0	0	0	0	**1**	0	0
2002	MIA	15	0	11	5	6	0.0	0	0	0	0	0	**1**	0	0
		95	4	142	104	38	6.0	1	0	0	0	4	3	0	0

=== Playoffs ===
Year	Team	Games		Tackles				Interceptions				Fumbles			
Year	Team	GP	GS	Comb	Solo	Ast	Sck	Int	Yds	TD	Lng	FF	FR	Yds	TD
1997	NYG	1	0	**3**	**3**	0	0.0	0	0	0	0	0	0	0	0
2001	MIA	1	1	**3**	2	**1**	**1.0**	0	0	0	0	0	0	0	0
		2	1	6	5	1	1.0	0	0	0	0	0	0	0	0
