= Shawn Draper =

American football player (born 1979)

No. 46, 49, 72, 77, 79
- Positions: Tight end, guard, tackle

Personal information
- Born: April 5, 1979 (age 47); Huntsville, Alabama, U.S.

Career information
- College: Alabama
- NFL draft: 2001: 5th round, 156th overall pick

Career history
- Miami Dolphins (2001–2002); Minnesota Vikings (2002)*; Carolina Panthers (2002)*; Philadelphia Eagles (2002)*; Carolina Panthers (2002); New Orleans Saints (2003–2004)*; Atlanta Falcons (2005)*; (2006)*
- * Offseason or practice squad member only

Shawn Draper (born April 5, 1979) is an American former professional football tight end and offensive lineman of the National Football League (NFL). He was selected by the Miami Dolphins in the fifth round of the 2001 NFL draft with the 156th overall pick. He played college football at Alabama. He played high school football at S. R. Butler High School in Huntsville.

Draper was also a member of the Minnesota Vikings, Carolina Panthers, Philadelphia Eagles, New Orleans Saints, and Atlanta Falcons.
