= Brody Liddiard =

American football player (born 1977)

No. 43
- Positions: Long snapper, tight end

Personal information
- Born: June 12, 1977 (age 49); Salt Lake City, Utah, U.S.

Career information
- High school: Torrey Pines (San Diego, California)
- College: Colorado
- NFL draft: 2000: undrafted

Career history
- Minnesota Vikings (2000)*; New York Giants (2000); Miami Dolphins (2000); Minnesota Vikings (2001–2003)
- * Offseason or practice squad member only

Career NFL statistics
- Games played: 53
- Games started: 0
- Fumble recoveries: 1
- Stats at Pro Football Reference

Jon Brody Liddiard (born June 12, 1977) is an American former professional football player who was a long snapper in the National Football League (NFL). He played college football for the Colorado Buffaloes and was signed by the New York Giants as an undrafted free agent in 2000.

== Early life ==
Liddiard attended Torrey Pines High School in San Diego, California, where he played both long snapper and tight end. He then went on to play college football at the University of Colorado at Boulder.

== NFL career ==
Liddiard signed with the Minnesota Vikings as an undrafted free agent on April 25, 2000, following the 2000 NFL draft, but he was cut during training camp on August 14. On August 20, he signed with the New York Giants. After signing with the practice squad on September 4, Liddiard was promoted to the active roster September 9 but was released two days later without appearing in a game. On November 23, he signed with the Miami Dolphins and appeared in five games.

He then spent the next three seasons playing for the Minnesota Vikings as the team's long snapper and reserve tight end, appearing in all 16 games those three seasons.

Following the 2003 season, Liddiard had surgery to repair his injured shoulder. He spent the following pre-season competing with rookie Cullen Loeffler for long snapping duties. Liddiard was given his release on September 4, 2004.
