= Leslie Shepherd (American football) =

American football player (born 1969)

No. 86, 84
- Position: Wide receiver

Personal information
- Born: November 3, 1969 (age 57); Washington, D.C., U.S.
- Listed height: 6 ft 0 in (1.83 m)
- Listed weight: 195 lb (88 kg)

Career information
- High school: Forestville High
- College: Temple
- NFL draft: 1992: undrafted

Career history
- Tampa Bay Buccaneers (1992)*; Pittsburgh Steelers (1993)*; Washington Redskins (1994–1998); Cleveland Browns (1999); Miami Dolphins (2000); Washington Redskins (2002)*
- * Offseason or practice squad member only

Career NFL statistics
- Receptions: 183
- Receiving yards: 2,832
- Receiving touchdowns: 22
- Stats at Pro Football Reference

Leslie Glenard Shepherd (born November 3, 1969) is an American former professional football player who was a wide receiver in the National Football League. He played seven years, the first five with the Washington Redskins, and one apiece for the Cleveland Browns and the Miami Dolphins. Arguably his best season came in 1998, when he had nine touchdowns, eight receiving and one rushing.

Shepherd attended Forestville High School in Forestville, Maryland, where he led the football team to an undefeated regular season and the first state playoffs berth in school history in 1986 before earning Parade All-American honors the following year. He had 77 catches for 1,700 yards and 22 touchdowns in his career and was considered one of the top wide receiver recruits in the country. Shepherd committed to play college football for the Miami Hurricanes on National Signing Day in February 1988, but failed to qualify academically under Proposition 48 guidelines and was released from his scholarship. He subsequently signed with the Temple Owls, where he caught 45 passes in three seasons, including 26 receptions as a senior.

He now coaches at Gwynn Park High School in Brandywine, Maryland.

== NFL career statistics ==
Legend
**Bold**	Career high

=== Regular season ===
Year	Team	Games		Receiving				
Year	Team	GP	GS	Rec	Yds	Avg	Lng	TD
1994	WAS	3	0	1	8	8.0	8	0
1995	WAS	14	4	29	486	16.8	**73**	2
1996	WAS	12	6	23	344	15.0	52	3
1997	WAS	11	9	29	562	**19.4**	48	5
1998	WAS	**16**	**16**	**43**	**712**	16.6	43	**8**
1999	CLE	9	8	23	274	11.9	36	0
2000	MIA	13	11	35	446	12.7	46	4
		78	54	183	2,832	15.5	73	22

=== Playoffs ===
Year	Team	Games		Receiving				
Year	Team	GP	GS	Rec	Yds	Avg	Lng	TD
2000	MIA	1	0	4	20	5.0	11	0
		1	0	4	20	5.0	11	0
