= Lamar Smith (American football) =

American football player (born 1970)

No. 36, 26, 25
- Position: Running back

Personal information
- Born: November 29, 1970 (age 55); Fort Wayne, Indiana, U.S.
- Listed height: 5 ft 11 in (1.80 m)
- Listed weight: 224 lb (102 kg)

Career information
- High school: South Side (Fort Wayne)
- College: Houston
- NFL draft: 1994: 3rd round, 73rd overall pick

Career history
- Seattle Seahawks (1994–1997); New Orleans Saints (1998–1999); Miami Dolphins (2000–2001); Carolina Panthers (2002); Green Bay Packers (2003)*; New Orleans Saints (2003)
- * Offseason or practice squad member only

Career NFL statistics
- Rushing yards: 4,853
- Rushing average: 3.7
- Rushing touchdowns: 38
- Stats at Pro Football Reference

Lamar Hunter Smith (born November 29, 1970) is an American former professional football player who was a running back in the National Football League (NFL) for the Seattle Seahawks, Miami Dolphins, New Orleans Saints, and Carolina Panthers from 1994 to 2003. He played college football for the Houston Cougars and was selected by Seattle in the third round of the 1994 NFL draft.

On December 30, 2000, Smith carried the ball a then-NFL record 40 times for the Dolphins in a wildcard playoff game against the Indianapolis Colts. He finished with 209 yards rushing, including a 17-yard touchdown run in overtime to give the Dolphins a 23–17 victory, Miami's most recent playoff victory as of the 2025 season.

== Education ==
Smith attended South Side High School in Fort Wayne. After high school, he attended Northeastern Oklahoma A&M College and then the University of Houston on scholarship for his final two years.

== Professional career ==
Pre-draft measurables
Height	Weight	Arm length	Hand span	40-yard dash	10-yard split	20-yard split	20-yard shuttle	Vertical jump
5 ft 10 1/2 in (1.79 m)	225 lb (102 kg)	31 7/8 in (0.81 m)	10 5/8 in (0.27 m)	4.67 s	1.62 s	2.72 s	4.37 s	35.5 in (0.90 m)
All values from NFL Combine

Smith was selected in the third round with the 73rd overall pick by the Seattle Seahawks in the 1994 NFL draft.

== Drunk driving ==
Smith was charged with vehicular assault in 1994. He was drinking and driving prior to a car wreck that left teammate Mike Frier paralyzed from the neck down. The prosecutor noted that Smith had drunk at least five beers and six-and-a-half ounces of Scotch shortly before his car struck a utility pole. Smith pleaded guilty to vehicular assault in 1996, and served 60 days in a work-release program. He was also ordered to give 35 to 50 percent of his NFL earnings to Frier over a seven-year period.

He was arrested on a second DUI charge in 2002 while playing for the Panthers.

== NFL Europe ==
In 2007, he participated in a coaching internship program with NFL Europe.

== NFL career statistics ==
=== Regular season ===
Year	Team	Games		Rushing					Receiving				
Year	Team	GP	GS	Att	Yds	Avg	Lng	TD	Rec	Yds	Avg	Lng	TD
1994	SEA	2	0	2	-1	-0.5	0	0	—	—	—	—	—
1995	SEA	12	0	36	215	6.0	68	0	1	10	10.0	10	0
1996	SEA	16	2	153	680	4.4	29	8	9	58	6.4	22	0
1997	SEA	12	2	91	392	4.3	35	2	23	183	8.0	22	0
1998	NO	14	9	138	457	3.3	33	1	24	249	10.4	35	2
1999	NO	13	2	60	205	3.4	24	0	20	151	7.6	26	1
2000	MIA	15	15	309	1,139	3.7	68	14	31	201	6.5	28	2
2001	MIA	16	16	313	968	3.1	25	6	30	234	7.8	65	2
2002	CAR	11	11	209	737	3.5	59	7	20	167	8.4	58	0
2003	NO	4	0	11	61	5.5	17	0	1	2	2.0	2	0
Career		115	57	1,322	4,853	3.7	68	38	159	1,255	7.9	65	7

=== Postseason ===
Year	Team	Games		Rushing					Receiving				
Year	Team	GP	GS	Att	Yds	Avg	Lng	TD	Rec	Yds	Avg	Lng	TD
2000	MIA	2	2	48	214	4.5	24	2	4	22	5.5	8	0
2001	MIA	1	1	6	6	1.0	3	0	1	6	6.0	6	0
Career		3	3	54	220	4.1	24	2	5	28	5.6	8	0
