= Arturo Freeman =

American football player (born 1976)

No. 27, 20, 25
- Position: Safety

Personal information
- Born: October 27, 1976 (age 50); Orangeburg, South Carolina, U.S.
- Listed height: 6 ft 1 in (1.85 m)
- Listed weight: 210 lb (95 kg)

Career information
- College: South Carolina
- NFL draft: 2000: 5th round, 152nd overall pick

Career history
- Miami Dolphins (2000–2004); Green Bay Packers (2005)*; Tennessee Titans (2005)*; New England Patriots (2005)
- * Offseason or practice squad member only

Awards and highlights
- First-team All-SEC (1997); Second-team All-SEC (1996)

Career NFL statistics
- Tackles: 189
- Interceptions: 5
- Sacks: 3.5
- Stats at Pro Football Reference

Arturo Freeman (born October 27, 1976) is an American former professional football player who was a safety for the Miami Dolphins and New England Patriots of the National Football League (NFL). He played college football for the South Carolina Gamecocks and was selected by the Dolphins in the fifth round of the 2000 NFL draft. He also signed with the Green Bay Packers briefly.

Pre-draft measurables
Height	Weight	Arm length	Hand span	40-yard dash	10-yard split	20-yard split	20-yard shuttle	Three-cone drill	Vertical jump	Broad jump	Bench press
6 ft 0 3/8 in (1.84 m)	188 lb (85 kg)	31 in (0.79 m)	9 1/2 in (0.24 m)	4.58 s	1.58 s	2.62 s	4.38 s	6.91 s	35.5 in (0.90 m)	10 ft 4 in (3.15 m)	14 reps
All values from NFL Combine

== NFL career statistics ==
Legend
**Bold**	Career high

=== Regular season ===
Year	Team	Games		Tackles					Interceptions					Fumbles			
Year	Team	GP	GS	Cmb	Solo	Ast	Sck	TFL	Int	Yds	TD	Lng	PD	FF	FR	Yds	TD
2000	MIA	8	0	3	2	1	0.0	0	0	0	0	0	0	0	0	0	0
2001	MIA	**16**	4	36	27	9	1.0	1	1	0	0	0	**7**	0	**2**	-5	0
2002	MIA	**16**	**16**	**80**	**63**	**17**	**1.5**	1	0	0	0	0	4	0	1	0	0
2003	MIA	**16**	0	30	23	7	1.0	**2**	0	0	0	0	2	**2**	1	0	0
2004	MIA	**16**	9	33	23	10	0.0	0	**4**	**59**	0	**47**	6	0	1	0	0
2005	NWE	2	1	7	5	2	0.0	0	0	0	0	0	0	0	0	0	0
		74	30	189	143	46	3.5	4	5	59	0	47	19	2	4	-5	0

=== Playoffs ===
Year	Team	Games		Tackles					Interceptions					Fumbles			
Year	Team	GP	GS	Cmb	Solo	Ast	Sck	TFL	Int	Yds	TD	Lng	PD	FF	FR	Yds	TD
2000	MIA	**2**	0	**1**	0	**1**	0.0	0	0	0	0	0	0	0	0	0	0
2001	MIA	1	0	**1**	**1**	0	0.0	0	0	0	0	0	0	0	0	0	0
		3	0	2	1	1	0.0	0	0	0	0	0	0	0	0	0	0
