= Kenny Mixon =

American football player (born 1975)

No. 79
- Position: Defensive end

Personal information
- Born: May 31, 1975 (age 51); Sun Valley, California, U.S.
- Listed height: 6 ft 4 in (1.93 m)
- Listed weight: 271 lb (123 kg)

Career information
- High school: Pineville (Pineville, Louisiana)
- College: LSU
- NFL draft: 1998: 2nd round, 49th overall pick

Career history
- Miami Dolphins (1998–2001); Minnesota Vikings (2002–2004)

Career NFL statistics
- Games played: 105
- Tackles: 302
- Sacks: 18.5
- Interceptions: 2
- Stats at Pro Football Reference

Kenneth Jermaine Mixon (born May 31, 1975) is an American former professional football player who was a defensive end for the Minnesota Vikings and the Miami Dolphins of the National Football League (NFL). He played college football for the LSU Tigers and was selected in the second round of the 1998 NFL draft.

== Early life ==
Mixon attended Pineville High School in Pineville, Louisiana. While there, he was an All-District selection, the District M.V.P., an All-State pick, and he won Central Louisiana Player of the Year honors. He was also a track and field star, competing in the shot put, and was a hurdler.

== College career ==
Mixon attended Louisiana State University, where he completed his career with 10 sacks, 100 tackles, 1 fumble recovery, and 1 forced fumble.

== Professional career ==
Mixon began his career with Miami Dolphins in 1998, being selected in the second round of the NFL Draft, 49th overall. He has played with the Vikings since 2002.

In August 2004, Mixon was suspended by the NFL for two games for violating the league's substance abuse policy after being convicted of DUI. In April 2005, he was released by the Vikings.

=== NFL statistics ===
Year	Team	Games	Combined tackles	Tackles	Assisted tackles	Sacks	Forced fumbles	Fumble recoveries
1998	MIA	16	36	23	13	2.0	0	0
1999	MIA	11	10	4	6	0.0	0	0
2000	MIA	16	43	24	19	2.5	1	1
2001	MIA	16	44	25	19	2.0	0	0
2002	MIN	16	71	45	26	4.5	0	0
2003	MIN	16	52	42	10	5.0	4	0
2004	MIN	14	46	28	18	2.5	0	0
Career		105	302	191	111	18.5	5	1
