= John Hall (placekicker) =

American football player (born 1974)

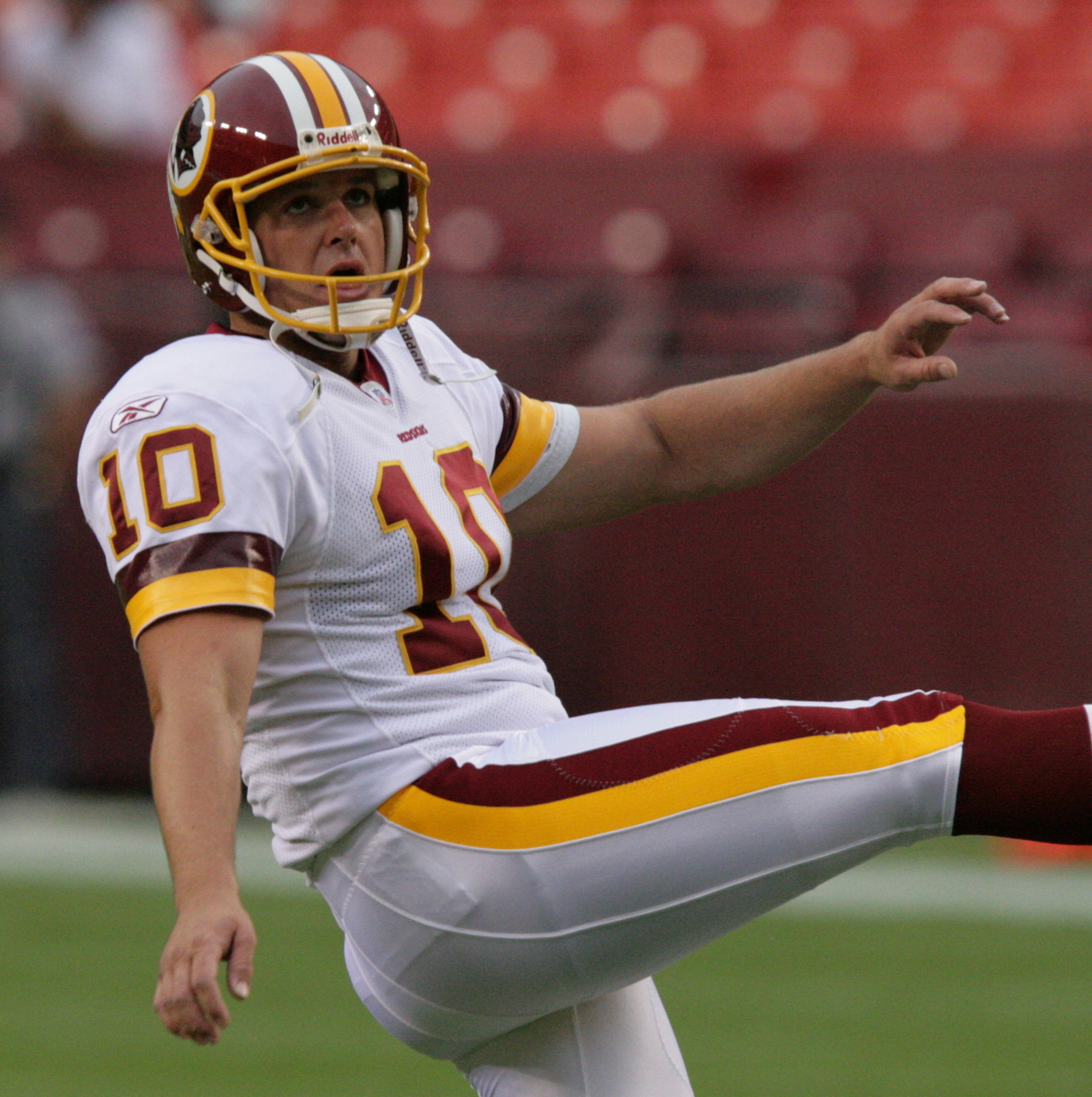
- Hall with the Washington Redskins in 2006

No. 9, 10
- Position: Placekicker

Personal information
- Born: March 17, 1974 (age 52); Port Charlotte, Florida, U.S.
- Listed height: 6 ft 3 in (1.91 m)
- Listed weight: 240 lb (109 kg)

Career information
- High school: Port Charlotte
- College: Wisconsin
- NFL draft: 1997: undrafted

Career history
- New York Jets (1997–2002); Washington Redskins (2003–2006)

Awards and highlights
- Second-team All-Big Ten (1996)

Career NFL statistics
- Field goals: 203/272 (.746)
- Extra points: 280/286 (.979)
- Longest field goal: 55
- Stats at Pro Football Reference

John Hall (born March 17, 1974) is an American former professional football player who was a placekicker in the National Football League (NFL). He kicked for Port Charlotte High School and played college football at the University of Wisconsin–Madison. While at Wisconsin, Hall played and won three bowl games (Rose, Hall of Fame and Copper Bowls). He signed as a rookie free agent to the New York Jets in 1997. During his time with the Jets, Hall established himself as one of the hardest hitting kickers in the NFL, once injuring a player on a kickoff tackle. Hall gave the Jets victory in The Monday Night Miracle in 2000 against the Dolphins with a 40-yard field goal in overtime.

Hall was troubled by a groin injury for the 2004 season and only appeared in eight games. Before being signed as a free agent by the Washington Redskins in 2003, he played six seasons for the New York Jets. His most accurate season came in 2005, when he converted 12 of 14 field goals for an 85.7% success rate, although his season long was only from 45 yards out. He also missed a crucial field goal, well within his range, in the Redskins' divisional playoff defeat against the Seattle Seahawks.

Hall's 53-yard field goal with 59 seconds left in the final regular season game against Oakland clinched a 2001 playoff berth for the Jets. Hall missed the last second field goal attempt during the September 11, 2006 game vs. the Minnesota Vikings causing his team a loss. Hall's problems have stemmed from his constant string of injuries. He was placed on the injured reserve list for the 2006 season with a strained groin and a strained quadriceps muscle in his leg. The Redskins released Hall on March 7, 2007, and he subsequently retired.

Hall is married to his wife Christina and they have three children (Brady, Ava, and Hanna). He no longer owns his own restaurant called John Hall's Goal Post Grill & Sports Bar in his hometown of Port Charlotte, Florida.
