= Doug Blevins =

American college football coach (1963–2024)

Biographical details
- Born: August 3, 1963; Abingdon, Virginia, U.S.
- Died: March 10, 2024 (aged 60)

Coaching career (HC unless noted)
- 1984–1985: Emory & Henry
- 1986–1987: East Tennessee State
- 1997–2002: Miami Dolphins (assistant)
Doug Blevins
- Spouse: Nenita

William Douglas Blevins (August 3, 1963 – March 10, 2024) was an American college football coach who was born with cerebral palsy.

== Life and career ==
William Douglas Blevins was born in Abingdon, Virginia, on August 3, 1963. He was a college football coach at Emory & Henry College and East Tennessee State University. He was also an assistant coach for the Miami Dolphins for six seasons.

Blevins was a World League kicking coordinator from 1995 to 1997.

Blevins died on March 10, 2024, at the age of 60.
