= Alonzo Mayes =

American football player (born 1975)

No. 85
- Position: Tight end

Personal information
- Born: June 4, 1975 (age 51); Oklahoma City, Oklahoma, U.S.
- Listed height: 6 ft 4 in (1.93 m)
- Listed weight: 259 lb (117 kg)

Career information
- High school: Douglass (Oklahoma City}
- College: Oklahoma State
- NFL draft: 1998: 4th round, 94th overall pick

Career history
- Chicago Bears (1998–2000); Miami Dolphins (2000-2002)

Awards and highlights
- Consensus All-American (1997); 2× First-team All-Big 12 (1996, 1997); Second-team All-Big Eight (1995)

Career NFL statistics
- Receptions: 33
- Receiving yards: 339
- Touchdowns: 1
- Stats at Pro Football Reference

Alonzo Lewis Mayes, Jr. (born June 4, 1975) is an American former professional football player who was a tight end for three seasons with the Chicago Bears of the National Football League (NFL). He played college football for the Oklahoma State Cowboys, earning consensus All-American honor in 1997.

== Early life ==
Mayes was born in Oklahoma City, Oklahoma. He attended Frederick A. Douglass High School in Oklahoma City, where he played for the Douglass Trojans high school football team.

== College career ==
Mayes received an athletic scholarship to attend Oklahoma State University and play for the Oklahoma State Cowboys football team from 1994 to 1997. As a senior in 1997, he was recognized as a consensus first-team All-American at tight end.

== Professional career ==
The Chicago Bears selected Mayes in the fourth round (94th pick overall) of the 1998 NFL draft, and he played for the Bears from 1998 to 2000. He finished his professional career with the Miami Dolphins, but never appeared in a regular season game for the Dolphins. In three NFL seasons with the Bears, Mayes played in thirty-seven games, started twenty-eight of them, and compiled thirty-three receptions for 339 yards and a touchdown. He was nicknamed "Showtime" for his zany celebrations.
