= Jerry Wilson (defensive back) =

American football player (born 1973)

No. 24, 42, 20
- Position: Safety

Personal information
- Born: July 17, 1973 (age 53); Alexandria, Louisiana, U.S.
- Listed height: 5 ft 11 in (1.80 m)
- Listed weight: 190 lb (86 kg)

Career information
- High school: LaGrange (Lake Charles, Louisiana)
- College: Southern
- NFL draft: 1995: 4th round, 105th overall pick

Career history
- Tampa Bay Buccaneers (1995); Miami Dolphins (1996–2000); New Orleans Saints (2001–2002); San Diego Chargers (2002–2005)

Career NFL statistics
- Tackles: 285
- Interceptions: 7
- Forced fumbles: 5
- Stats at Pro Football Reference

Jerry Lee Wilson Jr. (born July 17, 1973) is an American former professional football player who was a safety in the National Football League (NFL). He played for the Miami Dolphins, New Orleans Saints, and San Diego Chargers. He was selected in the fourth round of the 1995 NFL draft with the 105th overall pick. Wilson played college football for the Southern Jaguars. He graduated from LaGrange Senior High in Lake Charles, Louisiana.

Pre-draft measurables
Height	Weight	Arm length	Hand span	40-yard dash	10-yard split	20-yard split	20-yard shuttle	Vertical jump	Broad jump	Bench press
5 ft 10 in (1.78 m)	180 lb (82 kg)	31 1/8 in (0.79 m)	9 1/2 in (0.24 m)	4.63 s	1.64 s	2.70 s	4.06 s	32.5 in (0.83 m)	9 ft 9 in (2.97 m)	9 reps
