= Deon Dyer =

American football player (born 1977)

No. 33
- Position: Fullback

Personal information
- Born: October 2, 1977 (age 49); Chesapeake, Virginia, U.S.

Career information
- College: North Carolina
- NFL draft: 2000: 4th round, 117th overall pick

Career history
- Miami Dolphins (2000–2002); Houston Texans (2003)*; Tampa Bay Buccaneers (2004)*; Columbus Destroyers (2005)
- * Offseason or practice squad member only

Career NFL statistics
- Games played: 45
- Receptions: 2
- Receiving yards: 14
- Stats at Pro Football Reference

Deon Joseph Dyer (born October 2, 1977), nicknamed "Gunsmoke", is an American former professional football player who was a fullback in the National Football League (NFL). He was selected by the Miami Dolphins in the fourth round of the 2000 NFL draft. He played college football for the North Carolina Tar Heels.

Dyer played for Deep Creek High School in Chesapeake, Virginia and led the Hornets to the 1994 state championship game, which they lost to George Washington-Danville.
