= Damian Gregory =

American football player (born 1977)

Profile
- Position: Defensive tackle

Personal information
- Born: January 21, 1977 (age 49)

Career information
- College: Illinois State
- NFL draft: 2000: undrafted

Career history
- Miami Dolphins (2000–2001); Cleveland Browns (2002); Oakland Raiders (2003)*; Scottish Claymores (2004); Tampa Bay Buccaneers (2004); Detroit Lions (2006)*
- * Offseason or practice squad member only
- Stats at Pro Football Reference

Damian Gregory (born January 21, 1977) is an American former football defensive tackle. He played for the Miami Dolphins in 2001, the Cleveland Browns in 2002 and for the Tampa Bay Buccaneers in 2004.
