= Patrick Surtain =

American football player and coach (born 1976)

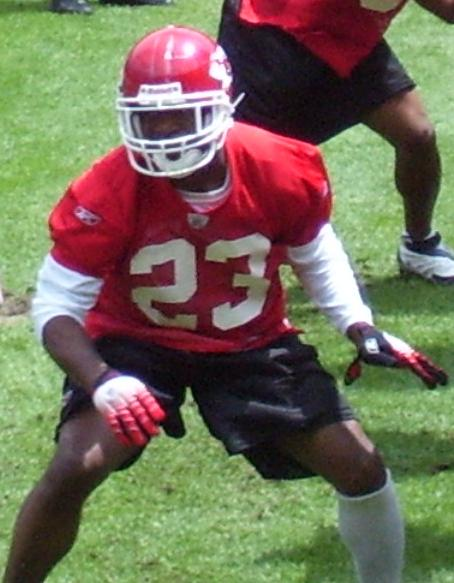
- Surtain with the Kansas City Chiefs in 2007

Personal information
- Born: June 19, 1976 (age 50); New Orleans, Louisiana, U.S.
- Listed height: 5 ft 11 in (1.80 m)
- Listed weight: 195 lb (88 kg)

Career information
- High school: Edna Karr (New Orleans)
- College: Southern Miss (1994–1997)
- NFL draft: 1998: 2nd round, 44th overall pick

Career history

Playing
- Miami Dolphins (1998–2004); Kansas City Chiefs (2005–2008)

Coaching
- American Heritage HS (FL) (2013–2014) Defensive backs coach; American Heritage HS (FL) (2015) Defensive coordinator; American Heritage HS (FL) (2016–2021) Head coach; Miami Dolphins (2022) Defensive assistant; Florida State (2023–2025) Defensive backs coach

Awards and highlights
- 2× First-team All-Pro (2002, 2003); 3× Pro Bowl (2002–2004); Third-team All-American (1997); C-USA Defensive Player of the Year (1997)

Career NFL statistics
- Tackles: 547
- Sacks: 7.5
- Forced fumbles: 8
- Fumble recoveries: 8
- Interceptions: 37
- Defensive touchdowns: 2
- Stats at Pro Football Reference

Patrick Frank Surtain (/sərˈtæn/ sər-TAN; born June 19, 1976) is an American football coach and former professional player who was a cornerback for 11 seasons in the National Football League (NFL). He was most recently the defensive backs coach for Florida State University from 2023 to 2025. He played college football for the Southern Miss Golden Eagles. He was selected by the Miami Dolphins in the second round of the 1998 NFL draft, and also played for the Kansas City Chiefs.

== Early life ==
Surtain attended high school at Edna Karr High School in New Orleans, where he completed 44 of 97 passes for 753 yards with seven touchdowns and rushed 137 times for 784 yards with 12 touchdowns as a quarterback. He also played baseball and ran track, and was also a member of the state title basketball and football teams in his senior year.

== College career ==
Surtain attended the University of Southern Mississippi, where he was a four-year letterman and two-year starter. In his junior year, Surtain started all 11 games and accumulated 84 tackles, 8 passes defended and six interceptions.

== Professional career ==
=== Miami Dolphins ===
==== 1998 ====
The Miami Dolphins selected Surtain in the second round (44th overall) of the 1998 NFL draft. He was the fourth cornerback drafted in 1998, after the likes of Charles Woodson (fourth overall) and Duane Starks (tenth overall).

On July 22, 1998, the Dolphins signed Surtain to a four–year, $2.40 million rookie contract that included a signing bonus of $800,000.

Throughout training camp, he competed to be the No. 1 starting cornerback against Terrell Buckley and Sam Madison. Head coach Jimmy Johnson named him a backup and listed him as the third cornerback on the depth chart to begin the season, behind starting duo Sam Madison and Terrell Buckley.

On September 6, 1998, Surtain made his professional regular season debut in the Miami Dolphins' season-opener at the Indianapolis Colts as they won 24–15. In Week 2, Surtain had his first career interception on a pass attempt thrown by Rob Johnson to wide receiver Eric Moulds during a 13–7 victory against the Buffalo Bills. He appeared in all 16 games as a rookie in 1998, but did not receive a start and finished the season with two interceptions.

==== 1999 ====
He returned under head coach Jimmy Johnson in 1999 and began the season as the third cornerback on the depth chart behind Sam Madison and Terrell Buckley. On October 17, 1999, Surtain earned his first career start in lieu of Terrell Buckley and set a season-high with seven solo tackles, made two pass deflections, and intercepted a pass by Drew Bledsoe to wide receiver Vincent Brisby during a 31–30 victory at the New England Patriots. Following Week 12, head coach Jimmy Johnson named Surtain the No. 1 starting cornerback alongside Sam Madison and demoted Terrell Buckley to the third cornerback on the depth chart and nickelback. In Week 13, he started as the No. 2 starting cornerback and made four combined tackles (three solo), one pass deflection, and intercepted a pass by Peyton Manning to wide receiver Marvin Harrison during a 34–37 loss against the Indianapolis Colts. In Week 17, he had five solo tackles and set a career-high with two sacks during a 10–21 loss at the Washington Redskins. He had his first career sack on Rodney Peete for a four–yard loss. He finished his sophomore season with a total of 47 combined tackles (42 solo), five pass deflections, two interceptions, and two sacks in 16 games and six starts.

The Miami Dolphins finished the 1999 NFL season third in the AFC East with a 9–7 record to earn a Wild-Card berth. On January 9, 2000, Surtain started in the first playoff game of his career and had three solo tackles and two pass deflections during a 20–17 victory at the Seattle Seahawks in the AFC Wild-Card Game. On January 15, 2000, he had eight solo tackles in the Dolphins' 7–62 loss at the Jacksonville Jaguars in the Divisional Round.

==== 2000 ====
The Miami Dolphins promoted Dave Wannstedt to head coach after Jimmy Johnson announced his retirement from coaching following the 1999 NFL season. He entered training camp slated as the No. 2 starting cornerback under new defensive coordinator Jim Bates following the departure of Terrell Buckley via free agency. Head coach Dave Wannstedt named Surtain and Sam Madison as the starting cornerbacks to begin the season.

On September 3, 2000, Surtain started in the Miami Dolphins' home-opener against the Detroit Lions and had two solo tackles, three pass deflections, and intercepted a pass by Jon Kitna to running back Ricky Watters during a 0–23 victory. The following week, he made one solo tackle and set a new career-high with four pass deflections during a 7–13 loss at the Minnesota Vikings in Week 2. In Week 11, Surtain had two solo tackles, one pass deflection, and sealed the Dolphins' 17–7 victory at the San Diego Chargers with ten seconds remaining by intercepting a pass by Jim Harbaugh to wide receiver Jeff Graham. On December 17, 2000, he set a season-high with 11 combined tackles (eight solo), made three pass deflections, and had a forced fumble during a 13–20 loss to the Indianapolis Colts. He started all 16 games for the first time in his career and had a total of 54 combined tackles (44 solo), set a career-high with 21 pass deflections, made five interceptions, two forced fumbles, one sack, and a fumble recovery.

==== 2001 ====
On March 8, 2001, the Miami Dolphins signed Surtain to a seven–year, $27.71 million contract extension that included $14.00 million guaranteed and an initial signing bonus of $6.25 million. The contract restructured the remaining year Surtain had on his rookie contract and added an additional six years to keep him under contract throughout the 2005 NFL season.

He returned as the No. 2 starting cornerback alongside Sam Madison and was chosen over 2001 first-round pick (26th overall) Jamar Fletcher and 2000 third-round pick (84th overall) Ben Kelly.

On November 4, 2001, Surtain made two solo tackles, set a season-high with three pass deflections, and intercepted a pass thrown by Chris Weinke to tight end Wesley Walls and returned it 29–yards for his first career touchdown as the Dolphins defeated the Carolina Panthers 6–23. In Week 13, he set a season-high with six combined tackles (five solo) during a 41–6 victory against the Indianapolis Colts. On December 30, 2001, Surtain made four combined tackles (three solo), two pass deflections, and set a season-high with two interceptions on passes thrown by Michael Vick during a 21–14 win against the Atlanta Falcons. He started all 16 games and had a total of 54 combined tackles (44 solo), 16 pass deflections, three interceptions, two forced fumbles, two fumble recoveries, one sack, and a touchdown.

==== 2002 ====
He returned as a starting cornerback along with Sam Madison for the third consecutive season under head coach Dave Wannstedt. In Week 2, Surtain made two solo tackles, two pass deflections, and intercepted a pass by Peyton Manning to wide receiver Reggie Wayne before exiting in the second quarter of a 21–13 win at the Indianapolis Colts due to a knee sprain. He remained inactive for the next two games (Weeks 3–4) due to his sprained knee and ended his streak of 66 consecutive games and 39 consecutive starts in-a-row. On October 13, 2002, Surtain set a season-high with eight combined tackles (six solo), made one pass deflection, and had a pick-six after intercepting a pass thrown by Brian Griese and returning it for a 40–yard touchdown during a 24–22 win at the Denver Broncos. On December 15, 2002, Surtain made four combined tackles (two solo), two pass deflections, and sealed the Dolphins' 23–17 victory against the Oakland Raiders by intercepting a pass by Rich Gannon to wide receiver Jerry Rice with only 1:58 remaining in the game. He finished the season with 59 combined tackles (40 solo), 11 pass deflections, six interceptions, 1.5 sacks, and one touchdown in 14 games and 14 starts. He was voted to his first career Pro Bowl and went on to play in the 2003 Pro Bowl.

==== 2003 ====
Under defensive coordinator Jim Bates, Surtain and Sam Madison returned as the starting cornerbacks with Terrell Buckley returning and being selected to be the starting nickelback and primary backup. In Week 2, he had four combined tackles (three solo), two pass deflections, and had his first interception of the season on a pass by Vinny Testaverde during a 21–10 win at the New York Jets. The following week, he made one tackle, one pass deflection, and had his second consecutive game with an interception on a pass by Travis Henry to wide receiver Josh Reed during a 17–7 win against the Buffalo Bills in Week 3. On October 5, 2003, Surtain made three combined tackles (two solo), two pass deflections, and set a season-high with two interceptions on passes by Kerry Collins during a 23–10 win at the New York Giants. This marked his third consecutive game with an interception and his fourth in three games. In Week 7, he set a season-high with seven combined tackles (six solo) during a 13–19 overtime loss to the New England Patriots. In Week 8, he recorded four solo tackles, two pass deflections, and tied his season-high of two interceptions on pass attempts by Drew Brees during a 26–10 win at the San Diego Chargers. He was inactive for the Dolphins' 7–31 loss at the Tennessee Titans in Week 10 due to a groin injury. On November 27, 2003, Surtain made two combined tackles (one solo), set a season-high with three pass deflections, and set a career-high with his seventh interception of the season on a pass by Quincy Carter to wide receiver Randal Williams during a 40–21 win at the Dallas Cowboys. He finished the season with 53 combined tackles (34 solo), 15 pass deflections, and a career-high seven interceptions in 15 games and 15 starts. He was named to the 2004 Pro Bowl, earning his second consecutive Pro Bowl.

==== 2004 ====
Surtain and Sam Madison returned as the Miami Dolphins' starting cornerback tandem for the fourth consecutive season. He was inactive for the Dolphins' 13–16 loss at the Cincinnati Bengals in Week 2. On November 9, 2004, head coach Dave Wannstedt resigned after the Dolphins began the season with a 1-8 record. Defensive coordinator Jim Bates was appointed interim head coach for the remainder of the season. In Week 11, Surtain set a season-high with nine combined tackles (six solo), made two pass deflections, one sack, and intercepted a pass by Trent Dilfer to wide receiver Darrell Jackson during a 17–24 loss at the Seattle Seahawks. In Week 16, he had one solo tackle, made two pass deflections, recovered a fumble, and intercepted a pass by Luke McCown to wide receiver Dennis Northcutt during a 10–7 victory against the Cleveland Browns. He finished the season with 58 combined tackles (40 solo), 11 pass deflections, four interceptions, two forced fumbles, one fumble recovery, and one sack in 15 games and 15 starts.

On February 1, 2005, it was reported by multiple sources that Miami Dolphins' General Manager Rick Spielman had agreed to allow Surtain to seek a trade after they were unable to reach an agreement for a new contract during negotiations. The Dolphins were over the salary cap limit and were unable to reach an agreement with Surtain on a restructured deal.

He finished with 344 tackles, 6.5 sacks, and 29 interceptions in 108 career games with the Dolphins.

=== Kansas City Chiefs ===
==== 2005 ====
On April 15, 2005, the Miami Dolphins traded Surtain to the Kansas City Chiefs and agreed to trade a second-(46th overall) and fifth-round pick (162nd overall) in the 2005 NFL draft in return for Surtain and a 2005 fifth-round pick (138th overall). The Dolphins used the second-round selection (46th overall) on Matt Roth. On April 21, 2005, it was reported by ESPN that league sources had stated the Kansas City Chiefs had agreed to, on principle, sign Surtain to a seven–year, $50.80 million contract extension that includes $14.00 million guaranteed, pending a physical which he had ultimately passed. The contract would make him the third-highest paid cornerback in the NFL, behind Charles Woodson and Chris McAlister.

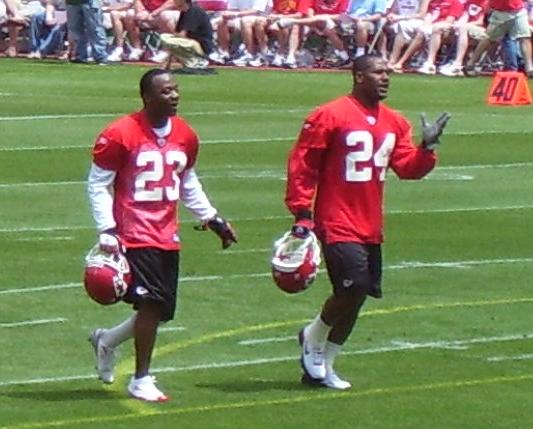
Patrick Surtain (left) with Ty Law at the Chiefs' 2007 mini-camp.

Throughout training camp, he competed against Eric Warfield to be a starting cornerback under defensive coordinator Gunther Cunningham. Head coach Dick Vermeil named Surtain a starting cornerback and paired him with Dexter McCleon to begin the season.

On September 11, 2005, Surtain started in the Kansas City Chiefs' home-opener against the New York Jets and made one solo tackle, a pass deflection, a fumble recovery, and intercepted a pass thrown by Chad Pennington and returned it for 53–yards during a 27–7 victory. In Week 7, Surtain had six combined tackles (three solo) and set a season-high with three pass deflections as the Chiefs won 30–20 against his former team the Miami Dolphins. He was inactive for the Chiefs' 27–23 victory against the Oakland Raiders in Week 9. In Week 16, he set a season-high with seven solo tackles, made one pass deflection, and intercepted a pass by Drew Brees to running back LaDainian Tomlinson during a 20–7 win against the San Diego Chargers. He finished the season with 57 combined tackles (47 solo), 12 pass deflections, and four interceptions in 15 games and 15 starts.

==== 2006 ====
The Kansas City Chiefs hired former New York Jets' head coach Herm Edwards to replace Dick Vermeil as their head coach following his retirement. He retained Gunther Cunningham as defensive coordinator and named Surtain a starting cornerback to begin the season and paired him with Ty Law.

In Week 4, Surtain set a season-high with eight solo tackles during a 23–20 victory at the Arizona Cardinals. On October 29, 2006, he made one solo tackle, one pass deflection, and had his lone interception of the season on a pass by Seneca Wallace to Darrell Jackson during a 35–28 victory against the Seattle Seahawks. He started all 16 games and had 68 combined tackles (60 solo), six pass deflections, one sack, and one interception.

==== 2007 ====
He returned as the No. 2 starting cornerback alongside Ty Law to begin the 2007 NFL season. In Week 6, he made six solo tackles, set a season-high with two pass deflections, and intercepted a pass by Carson Palmer to wide receiver Chad Ochocinco during a 27–20 win against the Cincinnati Bengals. In Week 9, he had three solo tackles, one pass deflection, and intercepted a pass thrown by Brett Favre to wide receiver Greg Jennings as the Chiefs lost 22–33 against the Green Bay Packers. In Week 10, Surtain set a season-high with seven solo tackles during a 11–27 loss against the Denver Broncos. He started in all 16 games and had a total of 58 combined tackles (50 solo), six pass deflections, and two interceptions.

==== 2008 ====
He entered training camp slated as the de facto No. 1 starting cornerback following the departure of Ty Law. Head coach Herm Edwards named him a starting cornerback to begin the season and paired him with 2008 second-round pick (35th overall) Brandon Flowers. He was inactive for two games (Weeks 3–4) to begin the season after injuring his shoulder. Upon his return, he was demoted to begin a backup as the third cornerback on the depth chart after being surpassed by rookie fifth-round pick (140th overall) Brandon Carr. He was inactive for seven consecutive games (Weeks 9–14) due to a shoulder injury. On December 14, 2008, Surtain made two solo tackles, one pass deflection, and had his last career interception on a pass by Philip Rivers to wide receiver Chris Chambers during a 21–32 loss against the San Diego Chargers. He finished his last season in 2009 with only 11 solo tackles, three pass deflections, and one interception in eight games and two starts.

On February 24, 2009, the Kansas City Chiefs officially released Surtain. His release saved the Chiefs $6.20 million of cap space in 2009. He finished his career with the team with 192 tackles, one sack, and eight interceptions in 55 games.

== Coaching career ==
=== Miami Dolphins ===
Surtain was hired as a defensive assistant coach for the Miami Dolphins on February 18, 2022.

=== Florida State Seminoles ===
Surtain was hired as the defensive backs coach for the Florida State Seminoles on January 10, 2023. On December 5, 2025, he was dismissed by the program.

== NFL career statistics ==
Legend
**Bold**	Career high

=== Regular season ===
Year	Team	GP	Tackles				Fumbles			Interceptions					
Year	Team	GP	Cmb	Solo	Ast	Sck	FF	FR	Yds	Int	Yds	Avg	Lng	TD	PD
1998	MIA	**16**	30	23	7	0.0	0	0	0	2	1	1	1	0	9
1999	MIA	**16**	39	32	7	**2.0**	0	0	0	2	28	14	28	0	5
2000	MIA	**16**	52	42	10	1.0	**2**	1	0	5	55	11	43	0	**21**
2001	MIA	**16**	53	43	10	1.0	**2**	**2**	0	3	74	25	41	**1**	16
2002	MIA	14	59	40	**19**	1.5	0	0	0	6	**79**	13	40	**1**	11
2003	MIA	15	53	34	**19**	0.0	0	0	0	**7**	59	8	32	0	13
2004	MIA	15	58	40	18	1.0	0	1	0	4	2	1	2	0	11
2005	KC	15	57	47	10	0.0	0	1	0	4	57	14	**53**	0	13
2006	KC	**16**	**68**	**60**	8	1.0	2	1	0	1	0	0	0	0	5
2007	KC	**16**	58	50	8	0.0	0	1	0	2	25	13	23	0	6
2008	KC	8	11	11	0	0.0	1	0	0	1	50	**50**	50	0	3
Career		163	538	422	116	7.5	7	7	0	37	430	12	53	2	113

== Personal life ==
In 2016, Surtain became head coach at American Heritage School. His son, Patrick Surtain II, who played for him at American Heritage, was one of the top-ranked high school football players of the class of 2018 and played college football for the Alabama Crimson Tide. Like his father, Patrick II plays cornerback, and was drafted No. 9 overall in the 2021 NFL draft by the Denver Broncos, where he won Defensive Player of the Year for the 2024-25 season. He is married to Michelle Surtain (née Webster) and has 3 children, Patrick II, Paris, and Parker.

== Head coaching record ==
Year	Team	Overall	Conference	Standing	Bowl/playoffs
**American Heritage Patriots** () (2016–2021)
2016	American Heritage	14–0	5–0	1st	
2017	American Heritage	14–0	5–0	1st	
2018	American Heritage	11–2	4–1	2nd	
2019	American Heritage	10–2	0–0	1st	
2020	American Heritage	11–2	0–0	3rd	
2021	American Heritage	6–4	3–0	1st	
American Heritage:		66–10	17–1		
Total:		66–10			
National championship Conference title Conference division title or championship game berth
