= Trent Gamble =

American football player (born 1977)

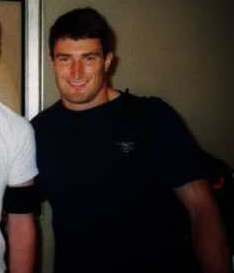
- Gamble in 2002

No. 42
- Position: Safety

Personal information
- Born: July 24, 1977 (age 49); Denver, Colorado, U.S.

Career information
- College: Wyoming
- NFL draft: 2000: undrafted

Career history
- Miami Dolphins (2000–2003)

Career NFL statistics
- Tackles: 43
- Fumble recoveries: 2
- Touchdowns: 1
- Stats at Pro Football Reference

Trent Ashford Gamble (born July 24, 1977) is an American former professional football player who was a safety in the National Football League (NFL). He was signed by the Miami Dolphins as an undrafted free agent in 2000. He played college football for the Wyoming Cowboys and high school football at Ponderosa High School in Parker, Colorado.
