= Anthony Cesario =

American football player (1976–2010)

No. 72
- Position: Guard

Personal information
- Born: July 19, 1976; Pueblo, Colorado, U.S.
- Died: September 25, 2010 (aged 34); Steamboat Springs, Colorado, U.S.
- Listed height: 6 ft 5 in (1.96 m)
- Listed weight: 305 lb (138 kg)

Career information
- High school: South (Pueblo)
- College: Colorado State
- NFL draft: 1999: 3rd round, 88th overall pick

Career history
- Jacksonville Jaguars (1999); New Orleans Saints (2000)*; Miami Dolphins (2000–2001)
- * Offseason or practice squad member only

Awards and highlights
- All-American (1998); Colorado State University Athletics Hall of Fame (inducted 2007)

Anthony Cesario (July 19, 1976 – September 25, 2010) was an American professional football offensive lineman. He attended Colorado State University, where he was a three-time All-Conference player. He was selected in the third round of the 1999 NFL draft.

After an NFL career cut short by injuries, Cesario ran a business in Fort Collins, Colorado. He was inducted into the Colorado State University Athletics Hall of Fame in 2007.

Cesario died of an apparent heart attack near Steamboat Springs, Colorado at 34 years old.
