= Jermaine Haley =

American football player (born 1973)

No. 94, 99
- Position: Defensive end

Personal information
- Born: February 13, 1973 (age 53); Hanford, California, U.S.
- Listed height: 6 ft 4 in (1.93 m)
- Listed weight: 325 lb (147 kg)

Career information
- High school: Hanford
- College: Butte College
- NFL draft: 1999: 7th round, 232nd overall pick

Career history
- Toronto Argonauts (1998–2000); Miami Dolphins (2000–2002); Washington Redskins (2003–2004)

Career NFL statistics
- Tackles: 93
- Sacks: 3.5
- Interceptions: 1
- Pass deflections: 7
- Forced fumbles: 1
- Fumble recoveries: 1
- Stats at Pro Football Reference

Career CFL statistics
- Total tackles: 68
- Sacks: 9
- Interceptions: 1

Jermaine Leroy Haley (born February 13, 1973) is an American former professional football player who was a defensive tackle in the National Football League (NFL) for the Miami Dolphins and the Washington Redskins. He was selected in the seventh round of the 1999 NFL draft with the 232nd overall pick. He played college football at Butte College. Prior to attending Butte, Haley went north to play in the Canadian Junior Football League, where he starred for the Surrey Rams and Okanagan Sun. Haley later played in the CFL for the Toronto Argonauts.

Pre-draft measurables
Height	Weight
6 ft 4 1/4 in (1.94 m)	325 lb (147 kg)
Values from Pro Day
