= Brian Walker (American football) =

American football player (born 1972)

No. 45, 25
- Position: Safety

Personal information
- Born: May 31, 1972 (age 54); Colorado Springs, Colorado, U.S.
- Listed height: 6 ft 1 in (1.85 m)
- Listed weight: 205 lb (93 kg)

Career information
- High school: Widefield (CO)
- College: Washington State
- NFL draft: 1996: undrafted

Career history
- Washington Redskins (1996–1997); Miami Dolphins (1997-1998); Seattle Seahawks (1999); Miami Dolphins (2000–2001); Detroit Lions (2002–2004)

Career NFL statistics
- Tackles: 361
- Sacks: 4
- Interceptions: 15
- Forced fumbles: 3
- Stats at Pro Football Reference

Brian Walker (born May 31, 1972) is an American former professional football player who was a safety in the National Football League (NFL) for the Washington Redskins, Miami Dolphins, Seattle Seahawks, and the Detroit Lions. He played college football for the Washington State Cougars.
