= 1998 Miami Dolphins season =

33rd season in franchise history

- Owner: Wayne Huizenga
- General manager: Eddie Jones
- Head coach: Jimmy Johnson
- Home stadium: Pro Player Stadium

Results
- Record: 10–6
- Division place: 2nd AFC East
- Playoffs: Won Wild Card Playoffs (vs. Bills) 24–17; Lost Divisional Playoffs (at Broncos) 3–38
- Pro Bowlers: DT Tim Bowens; LB Zach Thomas; DB Sam Madison

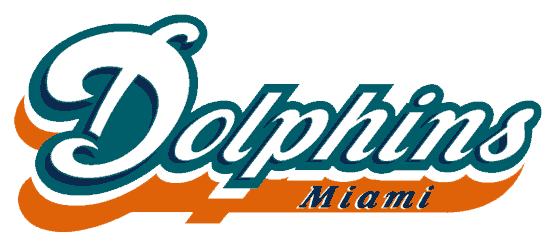
Miami Dolphins first wordmark from 1997

The 1998 Miami Dolphins season was the team's 33rd overall in professional football and its 29th in the National Football League (NFL). The Dolphins improved upon their previous season's record of 9–7, with a 10-6 record. The team qualified for the playoffs for the second straight year. The Dolphins defeated the Buffalo Bills 24–17 in the Wild Card round, but lost to the defending as well as the eventual Super Bowl champion Denver Broncos 38–3 in the Divisional round of the 1998 NFL postseason tournament.

The 2012 Football Outsiders Almanac states that the 1998 Dolphins had the single biggest defensive improvement (from the previous season) from 1991 to 2011.

As with the 1985 Bears, the Dolphins defeated a team (the Broncos) widely favored a few weeks earlier to surpass their unbeaten 1972 season, although this time the Dolphins were not defending their status as the only unbeaten team; the Giants had beaten the Broncos the in week 15 by the score of 20-16. Prior to the admission of the Texans in 2002, scheduling for NFL games outside a team's division was subject to much greater influence from table position during the previous season, that game was the first time the Dolphins had played the Broncos since that same 1985 season.

This season marked the last time the Dolphins finished with the #1 Defense in the NFL.

== Offseason ==
Additions	Subtractions
FS Brock Marion (Cowboys)	WR Brett Perriman (retirement)
G Kevin Donnalley (Oilers)	P John Kidd (Lions)
	FS George Teague (Cowboys)
	WR Qadry Ismail (Saints)
	G Everett McIver (Cowboys)

=== NFL draft ===
1998 Miami Dolphins draft
Round	Pick	Player	Position	College	Notes
1	29	John Avery	Running back	Ole Miss	
2	44	Patrick Surtain *	Cornerback	Southern Miss	
2	49	Kenny Mixon	Defensive end	LSU	
3	79	Brad Jackson	Linebacker	Cincinnati	
3	82	Larry Shannon	Wide receiver	East Carolina	
4	102	Lorenzo Bromell	Defensive end	Clemson	
5	143	Scott Shaw	Guard	Michigan State	
6	171	Nate Strikwerda	Center	Northwestern	
6	172	John Dutton	Quarterback	Nevada	
7	210	Jim Bundren	Guard	Clemson	
Made roster * Made at least one Pro Bowl during career

=== Undrafted free agents ===
1998 undrafted free agents of note
Player	Position	College
Ken Celaj	Guard	Georgia Tech
Nate Cochran	Punter	Pittsburgh
Chris Fontenot	Tight end	McNeese State
Selvesta Miller	Linebacker	South Carolina
Derrick Shepard	Defensive tackle	Georgia Tech
Antoine Simpson	Defensive tackle	Houston
Landon Smith	Fullback	Cincinnati
Derrick Steagall	Wide receiver	Georgia Tech

== Roster ==
1998 Miami Dolphins roster
Quarterbacks (QB): 14 Dan Gonzalez; 11 Damon Huard; 13 Dan Marino; Running backs (RB): 33 Karim Abdul-Jabbar; 20 John Avery KR; 34 Ronald Moore; 30 Bernie Parmalee; 36 Stanley Pritchett FB; Wide receivers (WR): 17 Todd Doxzon PR; 86 Oronde Gadsden; 19 Nate Jacquet; 81 O. J. McDuffie; 85 Lamar Thomas; 80 Iheanyi Uwaezuoke; Tight ends (TE): 84 Troy Drayton; 83 Henry Lusk; 89 Ed Perry LS	Offensive linemen (OL): 60 John Bock C/G; 76 James Brown T; 65 Kevin Donnalley G; 61 Tim Ruddy C; 68 Mike Sheldon G/T; 74 Brent Smith T; 67 Barry Stokes T; 78 Richmond Webb T; Defensive linemen (DL): 93 Trace Armstrong DE; 95 Tim Bowens DT; 91 Lorenzo Bromell DE; 75 Shane Burton DE/DT; 92 Daryl Gardener DT; 79 Kenny Mixon DE; 96 Danny Stubbs DE; 72 Barron Tanner DT; 99 Jason Taylor DE	Linebackers (LB): 57 O. J. Brigance MLB; 51 Anthony Harris OLB; 50 Dwight Hollier OLB; 53 Larry Izzo OLB; 52 Robert Jones OLB; 59 Derrick Rodgers OLB; 54 Zach Thomas MLB; Defensive backs (DB): 27 Terrell Buckley CB/PR; 28 Ray Hill CB; 38 Calvin Jackson SS; 29 Sam Madison CB; 31 Brock Marion FS; 21 Rayna Stewart FS; 23 Patrick Surtain CB; 45 Brian Walker SS; 24 Jerry Wilson CB/S; Special teams (ST): 10 Olindo Mare K; 82 Frank Wainright LS; 8 Klaus Wilmsmeyer P	Practice squad: -- Alan Barnett T; 26 Emmanuel McDaniel CB; -- Denis Montana WR; 43 Jamie Reader FB; -- Matt Reem T; Reserve: 77 Jeff Buckey G (IR); 56 Mike Crawford LB (PUP); 63 Mark Dixon G (IR); 7 Craig Erickson QB (IR); 87 Yatil Green WR (IR); 88 Charles Jordan WR (IR); -- Larry Shannon WR (IR); 9 Derrick Steagall WR (IR); 64 Randy Wheeler G (NF-Inj.); 22 Shawn Wooden S (IR); Rookies in italics 53 active, 10 reserve, 5 practice squad

== Schedule ==
Week	Date	Opponent	Result	Record	Venue	Attendance
1	September 6	at **Indianapolis Colts**	**W** 24–15	1–0	RCA Dome	60,587
2	September 13	**Buffalo Bills**	**W** 13–7	2–0	Pro Player Stadium	73,097
3	September 20	Pittsburgh Steelers	**W** 21–0	3–0	Pro Player Stadium	73,948
4	Bye					
5	October 4	at **New York Jets**	**L** 9–20	3–1	Giants Stadium	75,257
6	October 12	at Jacksonville Jaguars	**L** 21–28	3–2	Alltel Stadium	74,051
7	October 18	St. Louis Rams	**W** 14–0	4–2	Pro Player Stadium	65,418
8	October 25	**New England Patriots**	**W** 12–9 (OT)	5–2	Pro Player Stadium	73,973
9	November 1	at **Buffalo Bills**	**L** 24–30	5–3	Ralph Wilson Stadium	79,011
10	November 8	**Indianapolis Colts**	**W** 27–14	6–3	Pro Player Stadium	73,400
11	November 15	at Carolina Panthers	**W** 13–9	7–3	Ericcson Stadium	67,887
12	November 23	at **New England Patriots**	**L** 23–26	7–4	Foxboro Stadium	58,729
13	November 29	New Orleans Saints	**W** 30–10	8–4	Pro Player Stadium	73,216
14	December 6	at Oakland Raiders	**W** 27–17	9–4	Network Associates Coliseum	61,254
15	December 13	**New York Jets**	**L** 16–21	9–5	Pro Player Stadium	74,369
16	December 21	Denver Broncos	**W** 31–21	10–5	Pro Player Stadium	74,363
17	December 27	at Atlanta Falcons	**L** 16–38	10–6	Georgia Dome	69,754
Note: Intra-division opponents are in **bold** text.

== Playoffs ==
Round	Date	Opponent	Result	Record	Venue	Attendance
Wild Card	January 2	Buffalo Bills	W 24–17	1–0	Pro Player Stadium	72,698
Division	January 9	at Denver Broncos	L 3–38	1–1	Mile High Stadium	75,729

== Standings ==
AFC East
	W	L	T	PCT	PF	PA	STK
^{(2)} New York Jets	12	4	0	.750	416	266	W6
^{(4)} Miami Dolphins	10	6	0	.625	321	265	L1
^{(5)} Buffalo Bills	10	6	0	.625	400	333	W1
^{(6)} New England Patriots	9	7	0	.563	337	329	L1
Indianapolis Colts	3	13	0	.188	310	444	L2
