= 1997 Miami Dolphins season =

32nd season in franchise history

- Owner: Wayne Huizenga
- General manager: Eddie Jones
- Head coach: Jimmy Johnson
- Offensive coordinator: Kippy Brown
- Defensive coordinator: George Hill
- Home stadium: Pro Player Stadium

Results
- Record: 9–7
- Division place: 2nd AFC East
- Playoffs: Lost Wild Card Playoffs (at Patriots) 3–17
- Pro Bowlers: DT Tim Bowens

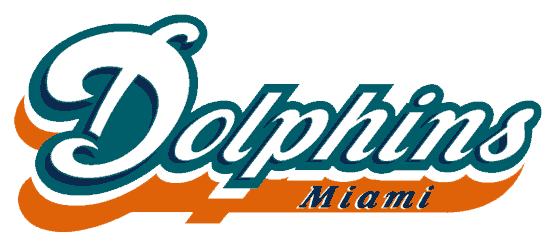
Miami Dolphins first wordmark from 1997.

The 1997 season was the Miami Dolphins' 32nd season in the National Football League (NFL), their 28th overall, their eighth under general manager Eddie Jones and their second under head coach Jimmy Johnson.

The Dolphins improved upon their previous season's output of 8–8, winning nine games. Seven of the team's sixteen games were decided by a field goal or less. This was also the season where the Dolphins released a new logo and new uniforms with a darker aqua and dark navy drop shadow in numbers. The uniforms and logo lasted until the 2012 season. During Week 3, the Dolphins were defeated by the defending Super Bowl champion Green Bay Packers for the first time in franchise history. This could be argued as the most cursed of all Dolphins seasons because it offered a turnaround where the New England Patriots defeated the Dolphins 3 times in the 1997 season, sweeping them. This was the first of five consecutive playoff appearances for the Dolphins. This season saw the Patriots return three Marino interceptions for touchdowns in New England (two of them in the 2nd quarter of the week 13 matchup, and one in the Wild Card matchup where the Patriots defeated Miami 17–3). The Wild Card loss came less than a week after the Dolphins lost to the Patriots 14–12 on Monday Night Football in Miami for the AFC East division title. Until 2021, this was the last time the Dolphins swept the New York Jets in back-to-back seasons.

== Offseason ==
=== NFL draft ===
1997 Miami Dolphins draft
Round	Pick	Player	Position	College	Notes
1	15	Yatil Green	Wide receiver	Miami	
2	44	Sam Madison *	Cornerback	Louisville	
3	73	Jason Taylor * ^{†}	Defensive end	Akron	
3	92	Derrick Rodgers	Linebacker	Arizona State	
3	93	Ronnie Ward	Linebacker	Kansas	
3	96	Brent Smith	Tackle	Mississippi State	
4	121	Jerome Daniels	Tackle	Northeastern	
5	149	Barron Tanner	Defensive tackle	Oklahoma	
5	157	Nick Lopez	Defensive end	Texas Southern	
6	166	John Fiala	Linebacker	Washington	
6	170	Brian Manning	Wide receiver	Stanford	
6	173	Mike Crawford	Linebacker	Nevada	
6	177	Ed Perry	Long snapper	James Madison	
7	203	Hudhaifa Ismaeli	Safety	Northwestern	
Made roster † Pro Football Hall of Fame * Made at least one Pro Bowl during career

== Staff ==
1997 Miami Dolphins staff
Front office: Chairman/managing general partner – Wayne Huizenga; Vice chairman – Don Shula; Vice chairman, president and CEO – Jimmy Johnson; General manager – Jimmy Johnson; Head coaches: Head coach – Jimmy Johnson; Offensive coaches: Offensive coordinator – Gary Stevens; Quarterbacks – Gary Stevens; Running backs/run game coordinator – Kippy Brown; Wide receivers – Larry Seiple; Tight ends – Pat Jones; Offensive line – Larry Beightol; Assistant offensive line – Rich McGeorge	Defensive coaches: Defensive coordinator – George Hill; Defensive line – Gary Godette; Assistant defensive line – Andre Carter; Defensive backs – Mel Phillips; Special teams coaches: Assistant special teams – Mike Westhoff; Strength and conditioning: Head strength and conditioning – John Gamble; Assistant strength and conditioning – Junior Wade

== Roster ==
1997 Miami Dolphins roster
Quarterbacks (QB): 7 Craig Erickson; 11 Damon Huard; 13 Dan Marino; Running backs (RB): 33 Karim Abdul-Jabbar; 48 Jim Kitts FB; 32 Jerris McPhail KR; 20 Ray Nealy FB; 30 Bernie Parmalee; 21 Lawrence Phillips; 42 Roosevelt Potts FB; 36 Stanley Pritchett FB; 35 Irving Spikes KR; Wide receivers (WR): 86 Qadry Ismail KR; 88 Charles Jordan PR; 82 Brian Manning; 81 O. J. McDuffie; 80 Brett Perriman; 85 Lamar Thomas; Tight ends (TE): 84 Troy Drayton; 89 Ed Perry LS	Offensive linemen (OL): 60 John Bock C/G; 76 James Brown T; 77 Jeff Buckey G; 66 Everett McIver G; 61 Tim Ruddy C; 68 Mike Sheldon T/G; 74 Brent Smith G/T; 78 Richmond Webb T; Defensive linemen (DL): 93 Trace Armstrong DE; 95 Tim Bowens DT; 75 Shane Burton DE; 70 Mike Chalenski DE; 92 Daryl Gardener DT; 72 Barron Tanner DT; 99 Jason Taylor DE	Linebackers (LB): 57 O. J. Brigance MLB; 56 Mike Crawford OLB; 51 Anthony Harris OLB; 50 Dwight Hollier; 59 Derrick Rodgers OLB; 54 Zach Thomas MLB; Defensive backs (DB): 27 Terrell Buckley CB; 25 Corey Harris FS/KR; 38 Calvin Jackson CB/FS; 34 Tim Jacobs CB; 29 Sam Madison CB; 28 Denorse Mosley CB; 23 George Teague FS; 45 Brian Walker SS; 24 Jerry Wilson CB; 22 Shawn Wooden SS; Special teams (ST): 17 John Kidd P; 10 Olindo Mare K	Practice squad: -- Isaac Curtis TE; -- Phillip Riley WR; 67 Barry Stokes T; -- Jasper Strong WR; 64 Randy Wheeler G; Reserve: -- Kirby Dar Dar WR (IR); 87 Yatil Green WR (IR); 53 Larry Izzo LB (IR); 96 Danny Stubbs DE (IR); 82 Frank Wainright LS (IR); 26 Bracy Walker S (IR); 55 Ronnie Ward LB (IR); Rookies in italics 53 active, 7 reserve, 5 practice squad

== Schedule ==
Week	Date	Opponent	Result	Record	Venue	Attendance
1	August 31	**Indianapolis Colts**	**W** 16–10	1–0	Pro Player Stadium	70,813
2	September 7	Tennessee Oilers	**W** 16–13 (OT)	2–0	Pro Player Stadium	64,439
3	September 14	at Green Bay Packers	**L** 18–23	2–1	Lambeau Field	60,075
4	September 21	at Tampa Bay Buccaneers	**L** 21–31	2–2	Houlihan's Stadium	73,314
5	Bye					
6	October 5	Kansas City Chiefs	**W** 17–14	3–2	Pro Player Stadium	71,794
7	October 12	at **New York Jets**	**W** 31–20	4–2	Giants Stadium	75,601
8	October 19	at Baltimore Ravens	**W** 24–13	5–2	Memorial Stadium	64,354
9	October 27	Chicago Bears	**L** 33–36 (OT)	5–3	Pro Player Stadium	73,156
10	November 2	at **Buffalo Bills**	**L** 6–9	5–4	Rich Stadium	78,011
11	November 9	**New York Jets**	**W** 24–17	6–4	Pro Player Stadium	73,809
12	November 17	**Buffalo Bills**	**W** 30–13	7–4	Pro Player Stadium	74,155
13	November 23	at **New England Patriots**	**L** 24–27	7–5	Foxboro Stadium	59,002
14	November 30	at Oakland Raiders	**W** 34–16	8–5	Oakland–Alameda County Coliseum	50,569
15	December 7	Detroit Lions	**W** 33–30	9–5	Pro Player Stadium	72,266
16	December 14	at **Indianapolis Colts**	**L** 0–41	9–6	RCA Dome	61,282
17	December 22	**New England Patriots**	**L** 12–14	9–7	Pro Player Stadium	74,379
Note: Intra-division opponents are in **bold** text.

== Playoffs ==
Round	Date	Opponent (seed)	Result	Record	Venue	Attendance
Wild Card	December 28	at New England Patriots (3)	L 3–17	0–1	Foxboro Stadium	60,041

== Game summaries ==
=== Week 1: vs Indianapolis Colts ===
Week 1: Indianapolis Colts at Miami Dolphins – Game summary

Quarter	1	2	3	4	Total
Colts	0	7	0	3	10
Dolphins	3	7	3	3	16

at Pro Player Stadium, Miami Gardens, Florida

- Date: August 31
- Game time: 1:00pm EDT
- Game weather: Partly cloudy, 81 °F (27 °C)
- Game attendance: 70,813
- TV announcers (NBC): Charlie Jones and Bob Trumpy
- Recap

== Standings ==
AFC East
	W	L	T	PCT	PF	PA	STK
^{(3)} New England Patriots	10	6	0	.625	369	289	W1
^{(6)} Miami Dolphins	9	7	0	.563	339	327	L2
New York Jets	9	7	0	.563	348	287	L1
Buffalo Bills	6	10	0	.375	255	367	L3
Indianapolis Colts	3	13	0	.188	313	401	L1
