= 2002 Miami Dolphins season =

37th season in franchise history

- Owner: Wayne Huizenga
- Head coach: Dave Wannstedt
- Home stadium: Pro Player Stadium

Results
- Record: 9–7
- Division place: 3rd AFC East
- Playoffs: Did not qualify
- All-Pros: CB Patrick Surtain (1st team); DE Jason Taylor (1st team); LB Zach Thomas (1st team); RB Ricky Williams (1st team)
- Pro Bowlers: DT Tim Bowens; CB Sam Madison; FS Brock Marion; CB Patrick Surtain; DE Jason Taylor; LB Zach Thomas; RB Ricky Williams

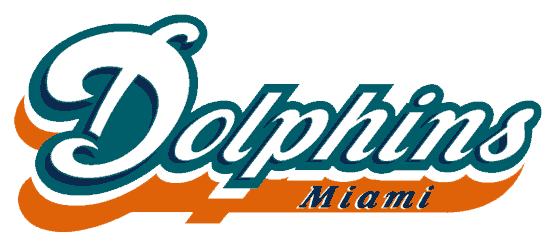
Miami Dolphins' wordmark, 1997

The 2002 season was the Miami Dolphins' 33rd in the National Football League (NFL), their 37th overall and their third under head coach Dave Wannstedt. The Dolphins failed to improve upon their previous season's output of 11–5, winning only nine games. The team missed the playoffs for the first time since 1996. This season began a string of 6 consesutive seasons where the Dolphins missed the playoffs, which was the longest stretch in their history up to that time.

In the off-season, the Dolphins acquired running back Ricky Williams from the New Orleans Saints. Despite the team not making the playoffs, he led the league with a career-high 16 rushing touchdowns. Williams made the Pro Bowl following the season, taking home the game's MVP honors. It was Williams' only Pro Bowl appearance of his career.

== Offseason ==
Additions	Subtractions
RB Ricky Williams (Saints)	RB Lamar Smith (Panthers)
P Mark Royals (Buccaneers)	TE Hunter Goodwin (Vikings)
DT Larry Chester (Panthers)	T Spencer Folau (Saints)
DE Rob Burnett (Ravens)	DE Lorenzo Bromell (Vikings)
	DE Kenny Mixon (Vikings)
	WR Jeff Ogden (Ravens)
	P Matt Turk (Jets)
	CB Terry Cousin (Panthers)

=== NFL draft ===
2002 Miami Dolphins draft
Round	Pick	Player	Position	College	Notes
3	90	Seth McKinney	Center	Texas A&M	
4	114	Randy McMichael	Tight end	Georgia	
5	161	Omare Lowe	Cornerback	Washington	
5	170	Sam Simmons	Wide receiver	Northwestern	
7	241	Leonard Henry	Running back	East Carolina	
Made roster † Pro Football Hall of Fame * Made at least one Pro Bowl during career

=== Undrafted free agents ===
2002 undrafted free agents of note
Player	Position	College
Tim Levcik	Quarterback	Robert Morris
Zak Kustok	Quarterback	Northwestern

== Staff ==
2002 Miami Dolphins staff
Front office: Owner/chairman of the board – Wayne Huizenga; President – Eddie Jones; Executive vice president/chief operating officer – Bryan Wiedmeier; Senior vice president of football operations/player personnel – Rick Spielman; Head coaches: Head coach – Dave Wannstedt; Assistant head coach/offensive coordinator – Norv Turner; Offensive coaches: Quarterbacks – Mike Shula; Running backs – Joel Collier; Wide receivers – Robert Ford; Tight ends – Pat Jones; Offensive line – Tony Wise; Offensive quality control – Judd Garrett	Defensive coaches: Defensive coordinator – Jim Bates; Defensive line – Clarence Brooks; Linebackers – Bob Sanders; Secondary – Mel Phillips; Defensive nickel package – Bill Lewis; Assistant defensive line/defensive quality control – Robert Nunn; Special teams coaches: Special teams – Keith Armstrong; Assistant special teams – Bernie Parmalee; Kicking – Doug Blevins; Strength and conditioning: Strength and conditioning – John Gamble; Assistant strength and conditioning – Brad Roll

== Roster ==
2002 Miami Dolphins roster
Quarterbacks (QB): 9 Jay Fiedler; 6 Ray Lucas; 18 Sage Rosenfels; Running backs (RB): 33 Deon Dyer FB; 47 Robert Edwards; 26 Leonard Henry; 44 Rob Konrad FB; 28 Travis Minor KR; 34 Ricky Williams; Wide receivers (WR): 83 Robert Baker PR; 88 Cris Carter; 84 Chris Chambers; 80 James McKnight; 87 Dedric Ward PR; Tight ends (TE): 85 Desmond Clark; 81 Randy McMichael; 82 Jed Weaver	Offensive linemen (OL): 65 Troy Andrew C/G; 63 Mark Dixon T; 60 Greg Jerman G/T; 68 Seth McKinney C/G; 75 Todd Perry G; 61 Tim Ruddy C; 76 Marcus Spriggs T; 71 Todd Wade T; Defensive linemen (DL): 96 David Bowens DE; 95 Tim Bowens DT; 90 Rob Burnett DE; 64 Larry Chester DT; 94 Jermaine Haley DT; 93 Adewale Ogunleye DE; 73 Dario Romero DT; 99 Jason Taylor DE; 91 Jay Williams DE	Linebackers (LB): 52 Morlon Greenwood OLB; 58 Scott Galyon OLB; 51 Tommy Hendricks MLB; 59 Derrick Rodgers OLB; 55 Justin Seaverns OLB; 54 Zach Thomas MLB; Defensive backs (DB): 21 Jamar Fletcher CB; 27 Arturo Freeman SS; 42 Trent Gamble CB/S; 24 Omare Lowe CB; 29 Sam Madison CB; 31 Brock Marion FS; 43 Scott McGarrahan SS; 20 Paul Miranda CB; 23 Patrick Surtain CB; 22 Shawn Wooden FS; Special teams (ST): 10 Olindo Mare K; 89 Ed Perry LS; 3 Mark Royals P	Practice squad: -- Matt Anderson G; 19 Margin Hooks WR; -- Matt O'Neal C; 62 Dwayne Pierce G; 17 Sam Simmons WR; Reserve: 67 Jim Bundren G (IR); 86 Oronde Gadsden WR (IR); 40 Ray Green CB (IR); 16 Albert Johnson (IR); 66 Jamie Nails G (IR); 56 Twan Russell LB (IR); 74 Brent Smith T (IR); Rookies in italics 53 active, 7 reserve, 5 practice squad

== Regular season ==
=== Schedule ===
Week	Date	Opponent	Result	Record	Venue	Attendance
1	September 8	Detroit Lions	W 49–21	1–0	Pro Player Stadium	72,216
2	September 15	at Indianapolis Colts	W 21–13	2–0	RCA Dome	56,650
3	September 22	New York Jets	W 30–3	3–0	Pro Player Stadium	73,426
4	September 29	at Kansas City Chiefs	L 30–48	3–1	Arrowhead Stadium	78,178
5	October 6	New England Patriots	W 26–13	4–1	Pro Player Stadium	73,369
6	October 13	at Denver Broncos	W 24–22	5–1	Invesco Field at Mile High	75,941
7	October 20	Buffalo Bills	L 10–23	5–2	Pro Player Stadium	73,180
8	Bye					
9	November 4	at Green Bay Packers	L 10–24	5–3	Lambeau Field	63,284
10	November 10	at New York Jets	L 10–13	5–4	Giants Stadium	78,920
11	November 17	Baltimore Ravens	W 26–7	6–4	Pro Player Stadium	73,013
12	November 24	San Diego Chargers	W 30–3	7–4	Pro Player Stadium	73,138
13	December 1	at Buffalo Bills	L 21–38	7–5	Ralph Wilson Stadium	73,287
14	December 9	Chicago Bears	W 27–9	8–5	Pro Player Stadium	73,609
15	December 15	Oakland Raiders	W 23–17	9–5	Pro Player Stadium	73,572
16	December 21	at Minnesota Vikings	L 17–20	9–6	Hubert H. Humphrey Metrodome	64,285
17	December 29	at New England Patriots	L 24–27 (OT)	9–7	Gillette Stadium	68,436

=== Game summaries ===
==== Week 1: vs. Detroit Lions ====
Week 1: Detroit Lions (0–0) at Miami Dolphins (0–0) – Game summary

Quarter	1	2	3	4	Total
Lions	0	7	7	7	21
Dolphins	7	21	14	7	49

at Pro Player Stadium, Miami Gardens, Florida

- Date: September 8, 2002
- Game time: 1:04 p.m.
- Game weather: Sunny, 87 °F (31 °C)
- Game attendance: 72,216
- Referee: Jeff Triplette (42)
- TV announcers (FOX): Dan Miller, Mark Carrier, Mike Di Pasquale
- Recap, Game Book

Game information

First quarter

- MIA – Ricky Williams 1-yard run (Olindo Mare kick), 3:07. Dolphins 7–0. Drive: 9 plays, 90 yards, 5:21.

Second quarter

- MIA – Trent Gamble fumble recovery in the end zone (Olindo Mare kick), 14:46. Dolphins 14–0.
- MIA – Randy McMichael 16-yard pass from Jay Fiedler (Olindo Mare kick), 10:11. Dolphins 21–0. Drive: 7 plays, 64 yards, 3:31.
- DET – Mike McMahon 2-yard run (Jason Hanson kick), 4:20. Dolphins 21–7. Drive: 14 plays, 80 yards, 5:51.
- MIA – Chris Chambers 9-yard pass from Jay Fiedler (Olindo Mare kick), 0:08. Dolphins 28–7. Drive: 8 plays, 66 yards, 1:28.

Third quarter

- MIA – Ricky Williams 2-yard run (Olindo Mare kick), 14:41. Dolphins 35–7. Drive: 1 play, 2 yards, 0:06.
- DET – Lamont Warren 13-yard pass from Mike McMahon (Jason Hanson kick), 6:19. Dolphins 35–14. Drive: 7 plays, 45 yards, 4:11.
- MIA – Robert Edwards 4-yard pass from Jay Fiedler (Olindo Mare kick), 3:59. Dolphins 42–14. Drive: 5 plays, 43 yards, 2:20.

Fourth quarter

- MIA – Robert Edwards 1-yard run (Olindo Mare kick), 10:39. Dolphins 49–14. Drive: 11 plays, 77 yards, 6:39.
- DET – Cory Schlesinger 2-yard run (Jason Hanson kick), 5:48. Dolphins 49–21. Drive: 11 plays, 77 yards, 4:51.

Top passers

- DET – Mike McMahon – 13/25, 179 yards, TD, INT
- MIA – Jay Fiedler – 18/27, 207 yards, 3 TD

Top rushers

- DET – Cory Schlesinger – 8 rushes, 28 yards, TD
- MIA – Ricky Williams – 20 rushes, 111 yards, 2 TD

Top receivers

- DET – Az-Zahir Hakim – 9 receptions, 97 yards
- MIA – Randy McMichael – 4 receptions, 73 yards, TD

==== Week 2: at Indianapolis Colts ====
Week 2: Miami Dolphins (1–0) at Indianapolis Colts (1–0) – Game summary

Quarter	1	2	3	4	Total
Dolphins	14	7	0	0	21
Colts	0	3	0	10	13

at RCA Dome, Indianapolis, Indiana

- Date: September 15, 2002
- Game time: 1:00 p.m.
- Game weather: none (indoor stadium)
- Game attendance: 56,650
- Referee: Walt Coleman (65)
- TV announcers (CBS): Ian Eagle & Solomon Wilcots
- Recap, Game Book

Game information

First quarter

- MIA – Jay Fiedler 1-yard run (Olindo Mare kick), 9:34. Dolphins 7–0. Drive: 9 plays, 73 yards, 5:26.
- MIA – Rob Konrad 9-yard pass from Jay Fiedler (Olindo Mare kick), 2:18. Dolphins 14–0. Drive: 7 plays, 49 yards, 3:33.

Second quarter

- IND – Mike Vanderjagt 25-yard field goal, 4:03. Dolphins 14–3. Drive: 15 plays, 74 yards, 8:18.
- MIA – Ricky Williams 10-yard pass from Jay Fiedler (Olindo Mare kick), 1:53. Dolphins 21–3. Drive: 4 plays, 71 yards, 2:10.

Fourth quarter

- IND – Marvin Harrison 16-yard pass from Peyton Manning (Mike Vanderjagt kick), 9:11. Dolphins 21–10. Drive: 8 plays, 80 yards, 3:29.
- IND – Mike Vanderjagt 23-yard field goal, 2:54. Dolphins 21–13. Drive: 13 plays, 71 yards, 3:19.

Top passers

- MIA – Jay Fiedler – 13/18, 187 yards, 2 TD, INT
- IND – Peyton Manning – 26/45, 289 yards, TD, 3 INT

Top rushers

- MIA – Ricky Williams – 24 rushes, 132 yards
- IND – Edgerrin James – 30 rushes, 138 yards

Top receivers

- MIA – Ricky Williams – 2 receptions, 62 yards, TD
- IND – Marvin Harrison – 11 receptions, 144 yards, TD

==== Week 3: vs. New York Jets ====
Week 3: New York Jets (1–1) at Miami Dolphins (2–0) – Game summary

Quarter	1	2	3	4	Total
Jets	0	3	0	0	3
Dolphins	10	3	0	17	30

at Pro Player Stadium, Miami Gardens, Florida

- Date: September 22, 2002
- Game time: 1:00 p.m.
- Game weather: Sunny, 88 °F (31 °C)
- Game attendance: 73,426
- Referee: Gerald Austin (34)
- TV announcers (CBS): Greg Gumbel, Phil Simms, Armen Keteyian
- Recap, Game Book

Game information

First quarter

- MIA – Olindo Mare 53-yard field goal, 3:30. Dolphins 3–0. Drive: 8 plays, 45 yards, 4:07.
- MIA – Randy McMichael 10-yard pass from Jay Fiedler (Olindo Mare kick), 1:10. Dolphins 10–0. Drive: 2 plays, 26 yards, 0:47.

Second quarter

- MIA – Olindo Mare 25-yard field goal, 13:30. Dolphins 13–0. Drive: 4 plays, 5 yards, 1:33.
- NYJ – John Hall 20-yard field goal, 10:00. Dolphins 13–3. Drive: 7 plays, 56 yards, 3:44.

Fourth quarter

- MIA – Olindo Mare 29-yard field goal, 12:20. Dolphins 16–3. Drive: 13 plays, 81 yards, 8:31.
- MIA – Ricky Williams 53-yard run (Olindo Mare kick), 5:00. Dolphins 23–3. Drive: 6 plays, 81 yards, 3:49.
- MIA – Travis Minor 5-yard run (Olindo Mare kick), 2:00. Dolphins 30–3. Drive: 4 plays, 21 yards, 2:08.

Top passers

- NYJ – Vinny Testaverde – 14/25, 125 yards, 2 INT
- MIA – Jay Fiedler – 16/30, 185 yards, TD

Top rushers

- NYJ – Curtis Martin – 16 rushes, 43 yards
- MIA – Ricky Williams – 24 rushes, 151 yards, TD

Top receivers

- NYJ – Wayne Chrebet – 5 receptions, 64 yards
- MIA – Randy McMichael – 5 receptions, 79 yards, TD

==== Week 4: at Kansas City Chiefs ====
Week 4: Miami Dolphins (3–0) at Kansas City Chiefs (1–2) – Game summary

Quarter	1	2	3	4	Total
Dolphins	7	9	7	7	30
Chiefs	10	14	7	17	48

at Arrowhead Stadium, Kansas City, Missouri

- Date: September 29, 2002
- Game time: 1:00 p.m.
- Game weather: Partly cloudy, 76 °F (24 °C)
- Game attendance: 78,178
- Referee: Ed Hochuli (85)
- TV announcers (CBS): Kevin Harlan, Randy Cross, Beasley Reece
- Recap, Game Book

Game information

First quarter

- MIA – Jay Fiedler 1-yard run (Olindo Mare kick), 13:07. Dolphins 7–0. Drive: 4 plays, 52 yards, 1:53.
- KC – Tony Gonzalez 9-yard pass from Trent Green (Morten Andersen kick), 6:53. Tied 7–7. Drive: 11 plays, 83 yards, 6:14.
- KC – Morten Andersen 50-yard field goal, 5:37. Chiefs 10–7. Drive: 4 plays, 4 yards, 1:01.

Second quarter

- MIA – Olindo Mare 42-yard field goal, 14:21. Tied 10–10. Drive: 12 plays, 56 yards, 6:16.
- KC – Priest Holmes 25-yard run (Morten Andersen kick), 12:37. Chiefs 17–10. Drive: 4 plays, 69 yards, 1:44.
- KC – Johnnie Morton 8-yard pass from Trent Green (Morten Andersen kick), 9:23. Chiefs 24–10. Drive: 4 plays, 58 yards, 1:32.
- MIA – Olindo Mare 29-yard field goal, 3:39. Chiefs 24–13. Drive: 7 plays, 46 yards, 2:38.
- MIA – Olindo Mare 25-yard field goal, 0:00. Chiefs 24–16. Drive: 9 plays, 49 yards, 2:44.

Third quarter

- KC – Tony Gonzalez 42-yard pass from Trent Green (Morten Andersen kick), 11:33. Chiefs 31–16. Drive: 7 plays, 80 yards, 3:27.
- MIA – Ricky Williams 3-yard run (Olindo Mare kick), 9:15. Chiefs 31–23. Drive: 4 plays, 72 yards, 2:18.

Fourth quarter

- KC – Tony Gonzalez 6-yard pass from Trent Green (Morten Andersen kick), 13:40. Chiefs 38–23. Drive: 8 plays, 61 yards, 4:35.
- MIA – Rob Konrad 6-yard pass from Jay Fiedler (Olindo Mare kick), 11:30. Chiefs 38–30. Drive: 5 plays, 63 yards, 2:10.
- KC – Morten Andersen 24-yard field goal, 7:33. Chiefs 41–30. Drive: 4 plays, 9 yards, 2:04.
- KC – Billy Baber 3-yard pass from Trent Green (Morten Andersen kick), 5:48. Chiefs 48–30. Drive: 2 plays, 20 yards, 0:51.

Top passers

- MIA – Jay Fiedler – 29/45, 310 yards, TD, 4 INT
- KC – Trent Green – 24/34, 328 yards, 5 TD

Top rushers

- MIA – Ricky Williams – 14 rushes, 66 yards, TD
- KC – Priest Holmes – 23 rushes, 52 yards, TD

Top receivers

- MIA – Chris Chambers – 6 receptions, 102 yards
- KC – Tony Gonzalez – 7 receptions, 140 yards, 3 TD

==== Week 5: vs. New England Patriots ====
Week 5: New England Patriots (3–1) at Miami Dolphins (3–1) – Game summary

Quarter	1	2	3	4	Total
Patriots	0	0	6	7	13
Dolphins	6	10	7	3	26

at Pro Player Stadium, Miami Gardens, Florida

- Date: October 6, 2002
- Game time: 1:00 p.m.
- Game weather: Sunny, 86 °F (30 °C)
- Game attendance: 73,369
- Referee: Terry McAulay (77)
- TV announcers (CBS): Greg Gumbel, Phil Simms, Armen Keteyian
- Recap, Game Book

Game information

First quarter

- MIA – Jay Fiedler 8-yard run (kick blocked), 0:08. Dolphins 6–0. Drive: 9 plays, 39 yards, 5:13.

Second quarter

- MIA – Chris Chambers 7-yard pass from Jay Fiedler (Olindo Mare kick), 11:38. Dolphins 13–0. Drive: 8 plays, 29 yards, 3:09.
- MIA – Olindo Mare 40-yard field goal, 1:11. Dolphins 16–0. Drive: 9 plays, 39 yards, 4:31.

Third quarter

- NE – David Patten 34-yard pass from Tom Brady (pass failed), 9:35. Dolphins 16–6. Drive: 5 plays, 68 yards, 1:35.
- MIA – Randy McMichael 1-yard pass from Jay Fiedler (Olindo Mare kick), 1:05. Dolphins 23–6. Drive: 10 plays, 74 yards, 5:29.

Fourth quarter

- NE – David Patten 25-yard pass from Tom Brady (Adam Vinatieri kick), 4:41. Dolphins 23–13. Drive: 8 plays, 80 yards, 2:58.
- MIA – Olindo Mare 33-yard field goal, 1:25. Dolphins 26–13. Drive: 8 plays, 27 yards, 3:16.

Top passers

- NE – Tom Brady – 17/31, 240 yards, 2 TD, 2 INT
- MIA – Jay Fiedler – 17/27, 190 yards, 2 TD

Top rushers

- NE – Kevin Faulk – 2 rushes, 17 yards
- MIA – Ricky Williams – 36 rushes, 105 yards

Top receivers

- NE – David Patten – 5 receptions, 102 yards, 2 TD
- MIA – Chris Chambers – 6 receptions, 62 yards, TD

==== Week 6: at Denver Broncos ====
Week 6: Miami Dolphins (4–1) at Denver Broncos (4–1) – Game summary

Quarter	1	2	3	4	Total
Dolphins	0	7	0	17	24
Broncos	6	3	3	10	22

at Invesco Field at Mile High, Denver, Colorado

- Date: October 13, 2002
- Game time: 8:35 p.m.
- Game weather: Clear, 58 °F (14 °C)
- Game attendance: 75,941
- Referee: Tony Corrente (99)
- TV announcers (ESPN): Mike Patrick, Paul Maguire, Joe Theismann and Suzy Kolber
- Recap, Game Book

Game information

First quarter

- DEN – Jason Elam 33-yard field goal, 12:09. Broncos 3–0. Drive: 7 plays, 24 yards, 2:51.
- DEN – Jason Elam 52-yard field goal, 4:14. Broncos 6–0. Drive: 11 plays, 40 yards, 6:18.

Second quarter

- DEN – Jason Elam 23-yard field goal, 11:25. Broncos 9–0. Drive: 13 plays, 57 yards, 6:00.
- MIA – Ricky Williams 10-yard run (Olindo Mare kick), 7:11. Broncos 9–7. Drive: 8 plays, 76 yards, 4:14.

Third quarter

- DEN – Jason Elam 40-yard field goal, 13:44. Broncos 12–7. Drive: 4 plays, 0 yards, 0:20.

Fourth quarter

- MIA – Ricky Williams 2-yard run (Olindo Mare kick), 9:48. Dolphins 14–12. Drive: 6 plays, 52 yards, 3:08.
- MIA – Patrick Surtain 40-yard interception return (Olindo Mare kick), Dolphins 21–12.
- DEN – Mike Anderson 1-yard pass from Brian Griese (Jason Elam kick), 3:37. Dolphins 21–19. Drive: 11 plays, 80 yards, 4:36.
- DEN – Jason Elam 55-yard field goal, 0:45. Broncos 22–21. Drive: 6 plays, 43 yards, 1:06.
- MIA – Olindo Mare 53-yard field goal, 0:06. Dolphins 24–22. Drive: 5 plays, 39 yards, 0:39.

Top passers

- MIA – Jay Fiedler – 19/29, 210 yards, INT
- DEN – Brian Griese – 27/46, 335 yards, TD, 2 INT

Top rushers

- MIA – Ricky Williams – 20 rushes, 49 yards, 2 TD
- DEN – Clinton Portis – 18 rushes, 75 yards

Top receivers

- MIA – Oronde Gadsden – 5 receptions, 77 yards
- DEN – Rod Smith – 9 receptions, 88 yards

==== Week 7: vs. Buffalo Bills ====
Week 7: Buffalo Bills (3–3) at Miami Dolphins (5–1) – Game summary

Quarter	1	2	3	4	Total
Bills	3	14	3	3	23
Dolphins	7	3	0	0	10

at Pro Player Stadium, Miami Gardens, Florida

- Date: October 20, 2002
- Game time: 1:00 p.m.
- Game weather: Sunny, 85 °F (29 °C)
- Game attendance: 73,180
- Referee: Johnny Grier (23)
- TV announcers (CBS): Dick Enberg, Dan Dierdorf, and Bonnie Bernstein
- Recap, Game Book

Game information

First quarter

- MIA – Randy McMichael 4-yard pass from Ray Lucas (Olindo Mare kick), 8:30. Dolphins 7–0. Drive: 9 plays, 57 yards, 3:56.
- BUF – Mike Hollis 46-yard field goal, 1:39. Dolphins 7–3. Drive: 9 plays, 34 yards, 5:23.

Second quarter

- BUF – Eric Moulds 70-yard pass from Drew Bledsoe (Mike Hollis kick), 12:40. Bills 10–7. Drive: 2 plays, 76 yards, 0:47.
- MIA – Olindo Mare 42-yard field goal, 4:57. Tied 10–10. Drive: 13 plays, 46 yards, 7:43.
- BUF – Nate Clements 29-yard interception return (Mike Hollis kick), 2:23. Bills 17–10.

Third quarter

- BUF – Mike Hollis 26-yard field goal, 4:16. Bills 20–10. Drive: 7 plays, 58 yards, 3:32.

Fourth quarter

- BUF – Mike Hollis 44-yard field goal, 1:12. Bills 23–10. Drive: 9 plays, 23 yards, 4:07.

Top passers

- BUF – Drew Bledsoe – 15/31, 182 yards, TD
- MIA – Ray Lucas – 13/33, 165 yards, TD, 4 INT

Top rushers

- BUF – Travis Henry – 22 rushes, 132 yards
- MIA – Ricky Williams – 25 rushes, 97 yards

Top receivers

- BUF – Larry Centers – 5 receptions, 51 yards
- MIA – James McKnight – 3 receptions, 42 yards

==== Week 9: at Green Bay Packers ====
Week 9: Miami Dolphins (5–2) at Green Bay Packers (6–1) – Game summary

Quarter	1	2	3	4	Total
Dolphins	0	0	0	10	10
Packers	0	14	10	0	24

at Lambeau Field, Green Bay, Wisconsin

- Date: November 4, 2002
- Game time: 9:00 p.m.
- Game weather: Clear, 30 °F (−1 °C)
- Game attendance: 63,284
- Referee: Tom White (123)
- TV announcers (ABC): Al Michaels, John Madden and Melissa Stark
- Recap, Game Book

Game information

Second quarter

- GB – Ahman Green 1-yard run (Ryan Longwell kick), 10:25. Packers 7–0. Drive: 8 plays, 52 yards, 4:27.
- GB – Ahman Green 23-yard pass from Brett Favre (Ryan Longwell kick), 0:46. Packers 14–0. Drive: 4 plays, 44 yards, 1:00.

Third quarter

- GB – Ryan Longwell 27-yard field goal, 9:52. Packers 17–0. Drive: 7 plays, 58 yards, 3:58.
- GB – Darren Sharper 89-yard interception return (Ryan Longwell kick), 0:00. Packers 24–0.

Fourth quarter

- MIA – Olindo Mare 46-yard field goal, 8:20. Packers 24–3. Drive: 9 plays, 24 yards, 3:59.
- MIA – Ray Lucas 1-yard run (Olindo Mare kick), 1:31. Packers 24–10. Drive: 9 plays, 73 yards, 1:53.

Top passers

- MIA – Ray Lucas – 22/39, 198 yards, 2 INT
- GB – Brett Favre – 16/25, 187 yards, TD, INT

Top rushers

- MIA – Ray Lucas – 9 rushes, 49 yards, TD
- GB – Ahman Green – 19 rushes, 72 yards, TD

Top receivers

- MIA – Chris Chambers – 5 receptions, 55 yards
- GB – Ahman Green – 6 receptions, 71 yards, TD

==== Week 10: at New York Jets ====
Week 10: Miami Dolphins (5–3) at New York Jets (3–5) – Game summary

Quarter	1	2	3	4	Total
Dolphins	0	3	7	0	10
Jets	7	3	0	3	13

at Giants Stadium, East Rutherford, New Jersey

- Date: November 10, 2002
- Game time: 8:30 p.m.
- Game weather: Cloudy, 65 °F (18 °C)
- Game attendance: 78,920
- Referee: Larry Nemmers (20)
- TV announcers (ESPN): Mike Patrick, Paul Maguire, Joe Theismann, and Suzy Kolber
- Recap, Game Book

Game information

First quarter

- NYJ – Curtis Martin 6-yard run (John Hall kick), 7:00. Jets 7–0. Drive: 1 play, 6 yards, 0:06.

Second quarter

- MIA – Olindo Mare 28-yard field goal, 11:36. Jets 7–3. Drive: 11 plays, 69 yards, 5:10.
- NYJ – John Hall 30-yard field goal, 0:03. Jets 10–3. Drive: 9 plays, 34 yards, 2:51.

Third quarter

- MIA – Rob Konrad 4-yard pass from Ray Lucas (Olindo Mare kick), 7:26. Tied 10–10. Drive: 5 plays, 39 yards, 2:22.

Fourth quarter

- NYJ – John Hall 27-yard field goal, 2:22. Jets 13–10. Drive: 11 plays, 84 yards, 5:09.

Top passers

- MIA – Ray Lucas – 19/28, 227 yards, TD
- NYJ – Chad Pennington – 17/27, 167 yards

Top rushers

- MIA – Ricky Williams – 20 rushes, 53 yards
- NYJ – Curtis Martin – 19 rushes, 74 yards, TD

Top receivers

- MIA – James McKnight – 2 receptions, 52 yards
- NYJ – Laveranues Coles – 5 receptions, 80 yards

==== Week 11: vs. Baltimore Ravens ====
Week 11: Baltimore Ravens (4–5) at Miami Dolphins (5–4) – Game summary

Quarter	1	2	3	4	Total
Ravens	0	7	0	0	7
Dolphins	7	10	3	6	26

at Pro Player Stadium, Miami Gardens, Florida

- Date: November 17, 2002
- Game time: 4:15 p.m.
- Game weather: Cloudy, 68 °F (20 °C)
- Game attendance: 73,013
- Referee: Walt Coleman (65)
- TV announcers (CBS): Kevin Harlan, Randy Cross, Beasley Reece
- Recap, Game Book

Game information

First quarter

- MIA – Ricky Williams 2-yard run (Olindo Mare kick), 3:43. Dolphins 7–0. Drive: 8 plays, 88 yards, 4:25.

Second quarter

- BAL – Travis Taylor 28-yard pass from Jeff Blake (Matt Stover kick), 9:08. Tied 7–7. Drive: 4 plays, 37 yards, 1:40.
- MIA – Ray Lucas 1-yard run (Olindo Mare kick), 6:19. Dolphins 14–7. Drive: 6 plays, 61 yards, 2:49.
- MIA – Olindo Mare 42-yard field goal, 0:08. Dolphins 17–7. Drive: 11 plays, 43 yards, 3:12.

Third quarter

- MIA – Olindo Mare 49-yard field goal, 5:07. Dolphins 20–7. Drive: 4 plays, 9 yards, 1:50.

Fourth quarter

- MIA – Ricky Williams 4-yard run (pass failed), 9:02. Dolphins 26–7. Drive: 9 plays, 82 yards, 5:11.

Top passers

- BAL – Jeff Blake – 14/28, 127 yards, TD, INT
- MIA – Ray Lucas – 18/26, 221 yards

Top rushers

- BAL – Jamal Lewis – 17 rushes, 47 yards
- MIA – Ricky Williams – 26 rushes, 102 yards, 2 TD

Top receivers

- BAL – Travis Taylor – 4 receptions, 48 yards, TD
- MIA – James McKnight – 4 receptions, 59 yards

==== Week 12: vs. San Diego Chargers ====
Week 12: San Diego Chargers (7–3) at Miami Dolphins (6–4) – Game summary

Quarter	1	2	3	4	Total
Chargers	3	0	0	0	3
Dolphins	10	10	7	3	30

at Pro Player Stadium, Miami Gardens, Florida

- Date: November 24, 2002
- Game time: 1:00 p.m.
- Game weather: Sunny, 77 °F (25 °C)
- Game attendance: 73,138
- Referee: Jeff Triplette (42)
- TV announcers (CBS): Greg Gumbel, Phil Simms, Armen Keteyian
- Recap, Game Book

Game information

First quarter

- MIA – Olindo Mare 20-yard field goal, 10:06. Dolphins 3–0. Drive: 8 plays, 29 yards, 4:01.
- SD – Steve Christie 38-yard field goal, 4:27. Tied 3–3. Drive: 10 plays, 57 yards, 5:39.
- MIA – James McKnight 20-yard pass from Ray Lucas (Olindo Mare kick), 1:43. Dolphins 10–3. Drive: 6 plays, 60 yards, 2:44.

Second quarter

- MIA – Ricky Williams 1-yard run (Olindo Mare kick), 6:45. Dolphins 17–3. Drive: 14 plays, 86 yards, 7:24.
- MIA – Olindo Mare 38-yard field goal, 0:15. Dolphins 20–3. Drive: 13 plays, 48 yards, 2:43.

Third quarter

- MIA – Ricky Williams 12-yard run (Olindo Mare kick), 2:14. Dolphins 27–3. Drive: 4 plays, 28 yards, 2:04.

Fourth quarter

- MIA – Olindo Mare 23-yard field goal, 13:02. Dolphins 30–3. Drive: 6 plays, 83 yards, 2:52.

Top passers

- SD – Drew Brees – 15/22, 107 yards, INT
- MIA – Ray Lucas – 14/23, 194 yards, TD

Top rushers

- SD – LaDainian Tomlinson – 14 rushes, 45 yards
- MIA – Ricky Williams – 29 rushes, 143 yards, 2 TD

Top receivers

- SD – Stephen Alexander – 8 receptions, 61 yards
- MIA – James McKnight – 3 receptions, 111 yards, TD

==== Week 13: at Buffalo Bills ====
Week 13: Miami Dolphins (7–4) at Buffalo Bills (5–6) – Game summary

Quarter	1	2	3	4	Total
Dolphins	14	0	7	0	21
Bills	3	14	14	7	38

at Ralph Wilson Stadium, Orchard Park, New York

- Date: December 1, 2002
- Game time: 1:00 p.m.
- Game weather: Snow, 25 °F (−4 °C)
- Game attendance: 73,287
- Referee: Bill Carollo (63)
- TV announcers (CBS): Greg Gumbel, Phil Simms, and Armen Keteyian
- Recap, Game Book

Game information

First quarter

- MIA – Ricky Williams 45-yard run (Olindo Mare kick), 11:11. Dolphins 7–0. Drive: 1 play, 45 yards, 0:09.
- BUF – Mike Hollis 39-yard field goal, 6:01. Dolphins 7–3. Drive: 12 plays, 54 yards, 5:10.
- MIA – Jed Weaver 1-yard pass from Ray Lucas (Olindo Mare kick), 0:06. Dolphins 14–3. Drive: 10 plays, 75 yards, 5:55.

Second quarter

- BUF – Drew Bledsoe 2-yard run (Mike Hollis kick), 3:37. Dolphins 14–10. Drive: 8 plays, 45 yards, 4:24.
- BUF – Peerless Price 20-yard pass from Drew Bledsoe (Mike Hollis kick), 0:11. Bills 17–14. Drive: 4 plays, 31 yards, 0:27.

Third quarter

- MIA – Ricky Williams 55-yard run (Olindo Mare kick), 5:33. Dolphins 21–17. Drive: 3 plays, 64 yards, 1:28.
- BUF – Peerless Price 73-yard pass from Drew Bledsoe (Mike Hollis kick), 4:35. Bills 24–21. Drive: 2 plays, 76 yards, 0;58.
- BUF – Eric Moulds 57-yard pass from Drew Bledsoe (Mike Hollis kick), 2:01. Bills 31–21. Drive: 1 play, 57 yards, 0:09.

Fourth quarter

- BUF – Travis Henry 1-yard run (Mike Hollis kick), 10:30. Bills 38–21. Drive: 7 plays, 61 yards, 4:19.

Top passers

- MIA – Ray Lucas – 6/11, 40 yards, TD
- BUF – Drew Bledsoe – 15/27, 306 yards, 3 TD

Top rushers

- MIA – Ricky Williams – 27 rushes, 228 yards, 2 TD
- BUF – Travis Henry – 35 rushes, 151 yards, TD

Top receivers

- MIA – Jed Weaver – 2 receptions, 18 yards, TD
- BUF – Eric Moulds – 5 receptions, 130 yards, TD

==== Week 14: vs. Chicago Bears ====
Week 14: Chicago Bears (3–9) at Miami Dolphins (7–5) – Game summary

Quarter	1	2	3	4	Total
Bears	0	0	3	6	9
Dolphins	7	7	7	6	27

at Pro Player Stadium, Miami Gardens, Florida

- Date: December 9, 2002
- Game time: 9:00 p.m.
- Game weather: Cloudy, Rain, 72 °F (22 °C)
- Game attendance: 73,609
- Referee: Ron Blum (7)
- TV announcers (ABC): Al Michaels, John Madden and Melissa Stark
- Recap, Game Book

Game information

First quarter

- MIA – Jed Weaver 5-yard pass from Jay Fiedler (Olindo Mare kick), 7:30. Dolphins 7–0. Drive: 4 plays, 38 yards, 2:01.

Second quarter

- MIA – Ricky Williams 15-yard run (Olindo Mare kick), 4:12. Dolphins 14–0. Drive: 7 plays, 84 yards, 3:14.

Third quarter

- CHI – Paul Edinger 52-yard field goal, 10:15. Dolphins 14–3. Drive: 4 plays, 2 yards, 0:54.
- MIA – Ricky Williams 63-yard run (Olindo Mare kick), 9:16. Dolphins 21–3. Drive: 2 plays, 65 yards, 0:59.

Fourth quarter

- MIA – Olindo Mare 23-yard field goal, 7:26. Dolphins 24–3. Drive: 4 plays, 5 yards, 1:39.
- MIA – Olindo Mare 29-yard field goal, 5:41. Dolphins 27–3. Drive: 4 plays, 7 yards, 1:31.
- CHI – Marty Booker 6-yard pass from Henry Burris (pass failed), 0:44. Dolphins 27–9. Drive: 6 plays, 58 yards, 1:26.

Top passers

- CHI – Chris Chandler – 7/17, 86 yards, 2 INT
- MIA – Jay Fiedler – 15/29, 196 yards, TD, INT

Top rushers

- CHI – Henry Burris – 5 rushes, 52 yards
- MIA – Ricky Williams – 31 rushes, 216 yards, 2 TD

Top receivers

- CHI – Marty Booker – 5 receptions, 46 yards, TD
- MIA – James McKnight – 4 receptions, 90 yards

==== Week 15: vs. Oakland Raiders ====
Week 15: Oakland Raiders (9–4) at Miami Dolphins (8–5) – Game summary

Quarter	1	2	3	4	Total
Raiders	3	3	3	8	17
Dolphins	10	7	3	3	23

at Pro Player Stadium, Miami Gardens, Florida

- Date: December 15, 2002
- Game time: 1:00 p.m.
- Game weather: Sunny, 66 °F (19 °C)
- Game attendance: 73,572
- Referee: Terry McAulay (77)
- TV announcers (CBS): Greg Gumbel, Phil Simms, Armen Keteyian
- Recap, Game Book

Game information

First quarter

- MIA – Olindo Mare 25-yard field goal, 10:24. Dolphins 3–0. Drive: 5 plays, 49 yards, 2:24.
- OAK – Sebastian Janikowski 26-yard field goal, 6:27. Tied 3–3. Drive: 6 plays, 5 yards, 2:35.
- MIA – Cris Carter 5-yard pass from Jay Fiedler (Olindo Mare kick), 4:01. Dolphins 10–3. Drive: 5 plays, 46 yards, 2:26.

Second quarter

- MIA – Travis Minor 4-yard run (Olindo Mare kick), 5:01. Dolphins 17–3. Drive: 13 plays, 97 yards, 7:53.
- OAK – Sebastian Janikowski 38-yard field goal, 0:45. Dolphins 17–6. Drive: 9 plays, 48 yards, 4:16.

Third quarter

- OAK – Sebastian Janikowski 45-yard field goal, 11:13. Dolphins 17–9. Drive: 9 plays, 32 yards, 2:37.
- MIA – Olindo Mare 27-yard field goal, 3:38. Dolphins 20–9. Drive: 14 plays, 57 yards, 7:35.

Fourth quarter

- OAK – Jerry Porter 20-yard pass from Rich Gannon (Rich Gannon-Jerry Porter pass), 14:52. Dolphins 20–17. Drive: 8 plays, 80 yards, 3:46.
- MIA – Olindo Mare 41-yard field goal, 2:28. Dolphins 23–17. Drive: 5 plays, 16 yards, 2:18.

Top passers

- OAK – Rich Gannon – 17/31, 204 yards, TD, INT
- MIA – Jay Fiedler – 21/32, 237 yards, TD

Top rushers

- OAK – Tyrone Wheatley – 4 rushes, 33 yards
- MIA – Ricky Williams – 27 rushes, 101 yards

Top receivers

- OAK – Doug Jolley – 3 receptions, 62 yards
- MIA – Chris Chambers – 7 receptions, 138 yards

==== Week 16: at Minnesota Vikings ====
Week 16: Miami Dolphins (9–5) at Minnesota Vikings (4–10) – Game summary

Quarter	1	2	3	4	Total
Dolphins	7	0	7	3	17
Vikings	0	3	7	10	20

at Hubert H. Humphrey Metrodome, Minneapolis, Minnesota

- Date: December 21, 2002
- Game time: 1:30 p.m.
- Game weather: none (indoor stadium)
- Game attendance: 64,285
- Referee: Johnny Grier (23)
- TV announcers (CBS): Dick Enberg, Dan Dierdorf, Bonnie Bernstein
- Recap, Game Book

Game information

First quarter

- MIA – Chris Chambers 59-yard pass from Jay Fiedler (Olindo Mare kick), 11:43. Dolphins 7–0. Drive: 5 plays, 80 yards, 3:17.

Second quarter

- MIN – Gary Anderson 35-yard field goal, 4:21. Dolphins 7–3. Drive: 12 plays, 58 yards, 5:55.

Third quarter

- MIN – Moe Williams 3-yard run (Gary Anderson kick), 7:45. Vikings 10–7. Drive: 13 plays, 78 yards, 7:15.
- MIA – Jed Weaver 3-yard pass from Jay Fiedler (Olindo Mare kick), 1:19. Dolphins 14-10. Drive: 10 plays, 56 yards, 6:26.

Fourth quarter

- MIN – D'Wayne Bates 13-yard pass from Randy Moss (Gary Anderson kick), 11:53. Vikings 17–14. Drive: 9 plays, 80 yards, 4:26.
- MIA – Olindo Mare 25-yard field goal, 6:09. Tied 17–17. Drive: 10 plays, 45 yards, 5:44.
- MIN – Gary Anderson 53-yard field goal, 0:17. Vikings 20–17. Drive: 12 plays, 45 plays, 5:52.

Top passers

- MIA – Jay Fiedler – 15/21, 177 yards, 2 TD, INT
- MIN – Daunte Culpepper – 20/29, 244 yards, 2 INT

Top rushers

- MIA – Ricky Williams – 15 rushes, 67 yards
- MIN – Daunte Culpepper – 10 rushes, 67 yards

Top receivers

- MIA – Chris Chambers – 2 receptions, 68 yards, TD
- MIN – Randy Moss – 7 receptions, 110 yards

==== Week 17: at New England Patriots ====
Week 17: Miami Dolphins (9–6) at New England Patriots (8–7) – Game summary

Quarter	1	2	3	4	OT	Total
Dolphins	7	14	0	3	0	24
Patriots	0	10	3	11	3	27

at Gillette Stadium, Foxborough, Massachusetts

- Date: December 29, 2002
- Game time: 1:00 p.m.
- Game weather: Partly cloudy, 40 °F (4 °C)
- Game attendance: 68,436
- Referee: Bob McElwee (95)
- TV announcers (CBS): Greg Gumbel, Phil Simms, Armen Keteyian
- Recap, Game Book

Game information

First quarter

- MIA – Ricky Williams 8-yard run (Olindo Mare kick), 3:17. Dolphins 7–0. Drive: 3 plays, 64 yards, 1:08.

Second quarter

- MIA – Ricky Williams 14-yard run (Olindo Mare kick), 8:52. Dolphins 14–0. Drive: 9 plays, 87 yards, 5:13.
- NE – Antowain Smith 11-yard run (Adam Vinatieri kick), 2:25. Dolphins 14–7. Drive: 7 plays, 58 yards, 3:00.
- MIA – James McKnight 32-yard pass from Jay Fiedler (Olindo Mare kick), 1:06. Dolphins 21–7. Drive: 6 plays, 76 yards, 1:19.
- NE – Adam Vinatieri 41-yard field goal, 0:00. Dolphins 21–10. Drive: 7 plays, 47 yards, 1:06.

Third quarter

- NE – Adam Vinatieri 36-yard field goal, 3:37. Dolphins 21–13. Drive: 11 plays, 45 yards, 5:03.

Fourth quarter

- MIA – Olindo Mare 28-yard field goal, 4:59. Dolphins 24–13. Drive: 6 plays, 21 yards, 2:58.
- NE – Troy Brown 3-yard pass from Tom Brady (Tom Brady–Christian Fauria pass), 2:46. Dolphins 24–21. Drive: 10 plays, 68 yards, 2:13.
- NE – Adam Vinatieri 43-yard field goal, 1:09. Tied 24–24. Drive: 4 plays, 9 yards, 1:02.

Overtime

- NE – Adam Vinatieri 35-yard field goal, 12:57. Patriots 27–24. Drive: 7 plays, 43 yards, 2:03.

Top passers

- MIA – Jay Fiedler – 11/25, 110 yards, TD
- NE – Tom Brady – 25/44, 221 yards, TD, INT

Top rushers

- MIA – Ricky Williams – 31 rushes, 185 yards, 2 TD
- NE – Antowain Smith – 19 rushes, 55 yards, TD

Top receivers

- MIA – Dedric Ward – 4 receptions, 34 yards
- NE – Kevin Faulk – 9 receptions, 70 yards

With the overtime loss, in addition to the Jets win over Green Bay, the Dolphins finished their season at 9–7, resulting in the Dolphins missing the playoffs for the first time since 1996.

== Standings ==
AFC East
	W	L	T	PCT	DIV	CONF	PF	PA	STK
^{(4)} New York Jets	9	7	0	.563	4–2	6–6	359	336	W2
New England Patriots	9	7	0	.563	4–2	6–6	381	346	W1
Miami Dolphins	9	7	0	.563	2–4	7–5	378	301	L2
Buffalo Bills	8	8	0	.500	2–4	5–7	379	397	W1
