= Shane Burton =

American football player (born 1974)

No. 75, 94, 98
- Positions: Defensive tackle, defensive end

Personal information
- Born: January 18, 1974 (age 52); Logan, West Virginia, U.S.
- Listed height: 6 ft 6 in (1.98 m)
- Listed weight: 305 lb (138 kg)

Career information
- High school: Bandys (Catawba, North Carolina)
- College: Tennessee
- NFL draft: 1996: 5th round, 150th overall pick

Career history
- Miami Dolphins (1996–1998); Chicago Bears (1999); New York Jets (2000–2001); Carolina Panthers (2002–2003); Kansas City Chiefs (2006)*
- * Offseason or practice squad member only

Awards and highlights
- Second-team All-SEC (1995)

Career NFL statistics
- Tackles: 212
- Sacks: 18
- Interceptions: 3
- Stats at Pro Football Reference

Franklin Shane Burton (born January 18, 1974) is an American former professional football player who was a defensive tackle for eight seasons in the National Football League (NFL). He played college football for the Tennessee Volunteers. He was selected in the fifth round of the 1996 NFL draft with the 150th overall pick. He was a member of the Miami Dolphins, Chicago Bears, New York Jets, and Carolina Panthers.

Born in Logan, West Virginia, Burton grew up in Chapmanville, West Virginia, and attended Chapmanville Jr. High School until his family moved to North Carolina during his last year of junior high. He graduated in 1992 from Bandys High School in Catawba, North Carolina.

== NFL career statistics ==
Legend
**Bold**	Career high

=== Regular season ===
Year	Team	Games		Tackles				Interceptions				Fumbles			
Year	Team	GP	GS	Comb	Solo	Ast	Sck	Int	Yds	TD	Lng	FF	FR	Yds	TD
1996	MIA	16	8	29	26	3	3.0	0	0	0	0	0	**1**	0	0
1997	MIA	16	4	27	18	9	**4.0**	0	0	0	0	**1**	**1**	0	0
1998	MIA	15	0	17	12	5	2.0	0	0	0	0	**1**	**1**	0	0
1999	CHI	15	0	11	7	4	3.0	**1**	**37**	0	**37**	0	0	0	0
2000	NYJ	16	16	**48**	**31**	**17**	1.0	0	0	0	0	0	**1**	**4**	0
2001	NYJ	15	13	41	25	16	2.0	**1**	0	0	0	0	0	0	0
2002	CAR	16	4	22	16	6	1.0	0	0	0	0	0	0	0	0
2003	CAR	16	4	17	12	5	2.0	**1**	10	0	10	0	**1**	0	0
		125	49	212	147	65	18.0	3	47	0	37	2	5	4	0

=== Playoffs ===
Year	Team	Games		Tackles				Interceptions				Fumbles			
Year	Team	GP	GS	Comb	Solo	Ast	Sck	Int	Yds	TD	Lng	FF	FR	Yds	TD
1997	MIA	1	0	0	0	0	0.0	0	0	0	0	0	0	0	0
1998	MIA	2	2	2	2	0	0.0	0	0	0	0	0	**1**	0	0
2001	NYJ	1	1	2	2	0	0.0	0	0	0	0	0	0	0	0
2003	CAR	4	0	**10**	**5**	**5**	**0.5**	0	0	0	0	0	0	0	0
		8	3	14	9	5	0.5	0	0	0	0	0	1	0	0
