= Tim Bowens =

American football player (born 1973)

No. 95
- Position: Defensive tackle

Personal information
- Born: February 7, 1973 (age 53); Okolona, Mississippi, U.S.
- Listed height: 6 ft 4 in (1.93 m)
- Listed weight: 325 lb (147 kg)

Career information
- High school: Okolona
- College: Ole Miss
- NFL draft: 1994: 1st round, 20th overall pick

Career history
- Miami Dolphins (1994–2004)

Awards and highlights
- NFL Defensive Rookie of the Year (1994); 2× Pro Bowl (1998, 2002); PFWA All-Rookie Team (1994); Miami Dolphins Honor Roll; Dolphins Walk of Fame (2012); Second-team All-SEC (1993)

Career NFL statistics
- Tackles: 414
- Sacks: 22
- Forced fumbles: 9
- Interceptions: 1
- Stats at Pro Football Reference

Timothy L. Bowens (born February 7, 1973) is an American former professional football player who was a defensive tackle for 11 seasons with the Miami Dolphins of the National Football League (NFL). He played college football for the Ole Miss Rebels, and was chosen with the 20th pick of the 1994 NFL draft by the Dolphins.

The Dolphins were initially criticized for picking Bowens, as he was overweight and had played only nine games in his college career at Mississippi. He had a terrific rookie season in 1994, and Bowens was named 'The NFL Defensive Rookie of the Year' by the Associated Press. He played with the Miami Dolphins for 11 years before he retired after the 2004 NFL season. He was inducted into the Miami Dolphins Honor Roll on October 27, 2024.

== Early life ==
Tim Bowens was born and grew up in Okolona, Mississippi, one of two county seats in rural Chickasaw County. He played football at Okolona High School. He was an All-State pick as a senior and an All-District pick as a junior and senior. As a senior, he led his team to the Class AA semifinals and an 11–2 record. He was also a two-year letter winner in basketball.

== NFL career statistics ==
Legend
**Bold**	Career high

=== Regular season ===
Year	Team	Games		Tackles				Interceptions				Fumbles			
Year	Team	GP	GS	Comb	Solo	Ast	Sck	Int	Yds	TD	Lng	FF	FR	Yds	TD
1994	MIA	16	15	**52**	**44**	8	3.0	0	0	0	0	**2**	1	0	0
1995	MIA	16	16	41	34	7	2.0	0	0	0	0	**2**	**2**	0	0
1996	MIA	16	16	48	41	7	3.0	0	0	0	0	**2**	1	0	0
1997	MIA	16	16	48	34	14	**5.0**	0	0	0	0	1	1	0	**1**
1998	MIA	16	16	30	21	9	0.0	0	0	0	0	0	0	0	0
1999	MIA	16	15	41	25	16	1.5	0	0	0	0	0	0	0	0
2000	MIA	15	15	40	28	12	2.5	**1**	0	0	0	0	0	0	0
2001	MIA	15	15	48	30	**18**	3.0	0	0	0	0	0	0	0	0
2002	MIA	16	16	36	24	12	0.0	0	0	0	0	0	0	0	0
2003	MIA	13	13	27	20	7	2.0	0	0	0	0	**2**	0	0	0
2004	MIA	2	2	3	2	1	0.0	0	0	0	0	0	0	0	0
		157	155	414	303	111	22.0	1	0	0	0	9	5	0	1

=== Playoffs ===
Year	Team	Games		Tackles				Interceptions				Fumbles			
Year	Team	GP	GS	Comb	Solo	Ast	Sck	Int	Yds	TD	Lng	FF	FR	Yds	TD
1994	MIA	2	2	**5**	**4**	1	0.0	0	0	0	0	0	0	0	0
1995	MIA	1	1	1	1	0	0.0	0	0	0	0	0	0	0	0
1997	MIA	1	1	4	3	1	0.0	0	0	0	0	0	0	0	0
1998	MIA	1	1	0	0	0	0.0	0	0	0	0	0	0	0	0
1999	MIA	2	2	**5**	**4**	1	**1.0**	0	0	0	0	0	0	0	0
2000	MIA	2	2	4	2	2	0.0	0	0	0	0	0	0	0	0
2001	MIA	1	1	**5**	2	**3**	0.0	0	0	0	0	0	0	0	0
		10	10	24	16	8	1.0	0	0	0	0	0	0	0	0
