= Jason Taylor (American football) =

American football player and coach (born 1974)

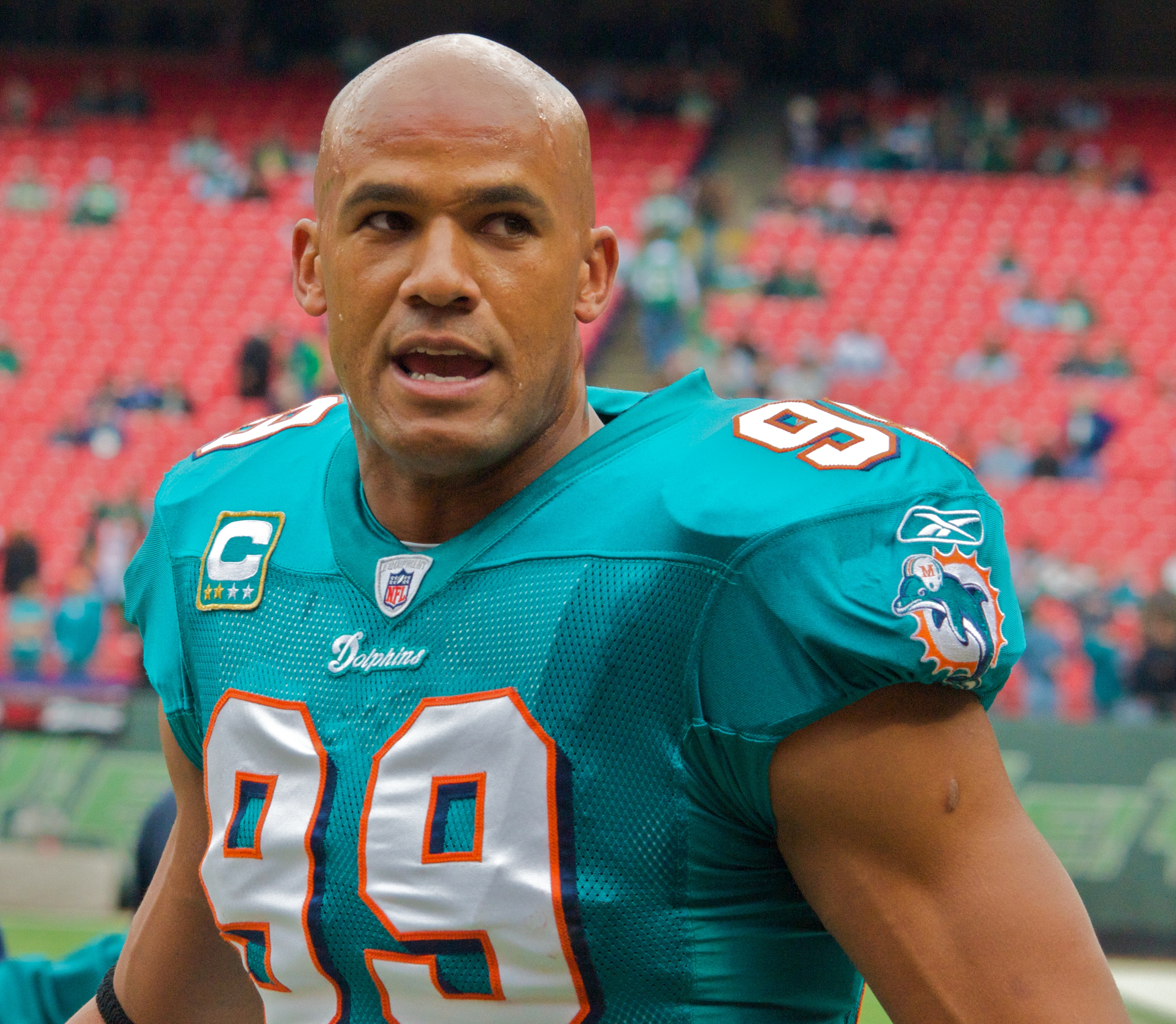
- Taylor with the Miami Dolphins in 2009

Miami Hurricanes
- Title: Defensive ends/Rush coach

Personal information
- Born: September 1, 1974 (age 52); Pittsburgh, Pennsylvania, U.S.
- Listed height: 6 ft 6 in (1.98 m)
- Listed weight: 244 lb (111 kg)

Career information
- Position: Defensive end (No. 99, 55)
- High school: Woodland Hills (Pittsburgh)
- College: Akron (1993–1996)
- NFL draft: 1997: 3rd round, 73rd overall pick

Career history

Playing
- Miami Dolphins (1997–2007); Washington Redskins (2008); Miami Dolphins (2009); New York Jets (2010); Miami Dolphins (2011)

Coaching
- St. Thomas Aquinas (FL) (2017–2021); Defensive line coach (2017–2019); Defensive coordinator (2020–2021); Miami (FL) (2022–present); Defensive analyst (2022); Defensive ends / rush coach (2023–present)

Awards and highlights
- NFL Defensive Player of the Year (2006); Walter Payton NFL Man of the Year (2007); 3× First-team All-Pro (2000, 2002, 2006); Second-team All-Pro (2001); 6× Pro Bowl (2000, 2002, 2004–2007); NFL sacks leader (2002); NFL forced fumbles leader (2006); PFWA All-Rookie Team (1997); NFL 2000s All-Decade Team; Miami Dolphins Honor Roll; Dolphins Walk of Fame (2018); 2× First-team All-MAC (1995, 1996); NFL record: Most career fumble return touchdowns: 6

Career NFL statistics
- Tackles: 788
- Sacks: 139.5
- Safeties: 3
- Forced fumbles: 48
- Fumble recoveries: 29
- Interceptions: 8
- Pass deflections: 87
- Defensive touchdowns: 9
- Stats at Pro Football Reference
- Pro Football Hall of Fame

Jason Paul Taylor (born September 1, 1974) is an American former professional football player who was a defensive end and linebacker in the National Football League (NFL), spending the majority of his career with the Miami Dolphins. He is currently the defensive ends coach for the Miami Hurricanes. Over the course of his 15-year NFL career, Taylor played for the Dolphins for 13 years in three separate stints (1997–2007, 2009, 2011), and also played a season each for the Washington Redskins (2008) and the New York Jets (2010).

Taylor was a four-year letterman and three-year starter playing college football for the Akron Zips before being selected by the Dolphins in the third round of the 1997 NFL draft with the 73rd overall pick.

Taylor won the Dolphins Team Newcomer of the Year award during his rookie season in 1997, and from then on, quickly established himself as one of the league's best performing defensive ends and pass-rushers in NFL history. He is currently ranked first in Dolphins history for the most games played by a defensive player in team history, with 204 games (including a defensive team record 130 consecutive games), and is also the Miami Dolphins all-time sack leader with 131 sacks. Overall, Taylor is currently 7th on the NFL all-time career sacks list with 139.5 sacks. Taylor is tied for 3rd most forced fumbles of all time with 48, and is the all-time leader in fumble return touchdowns with six, and interceptions returned for touchdowns by a defensive end with three, while his 246 fumble return yards are the 4th-highest total in NFL history. With nine career defensive touchdowns scored, he is also the all-time leader in that category for defensive linemen. He officially announced his retirement on December 28, 2011.

Throughout his career with the Dolphins, Taylor won numerous team awards including a team record four Dolphins Team MVP awards (2000, 2002, 2004, 2006), and a team record four Dolphins Team Leadership Awards (2002, 2006–2007, 2009). Along with being a six-time Pro Bowl selection, four-time first (3) or second (1) team All-Pro, a two-time NFL Alumni Defensive Linemen of the Year (2005–2006), and the NFL Alumni Pass-Rusher of the Year in 2000, Taylor was also a two-time AFC Defensive Player of the Year (2002, 2006), and was also named the NFL Defensive Player of the Year in 2006. He was named the NFL Walter Payton Man of the Year in 2007, selected to the NFL 2000s All-Decade Team, and enshrined into the Miami Dolphins Honor Roll in 2012. In 2017, Taylor was inducted into the Pro Football Hall of Fame in his first year of eligibility.

== Early life ==
Jason Taylor grew up around Pittsburgh, Pennsylvania, and played high school football for Woodland Hills High School. He was homeschooled from grades 10 through 12.

== College career ==
While attending the University of Akron, Taylor was a four-year letterman and three-year starter for the Akron Zips football team. He recorded 279 tackles, 21 sacks, seven fumbles recovered, and three interceptions in his college career. He was a two-time first-team All-Mid-American Conference selection as a junior and senior, as well as an All-America pick as a junior. As a junior, he played weakside linebacker and moved to left defensive end as a senior. In 1996, he earned National Defensive Player of the Week honors for his performance against Virginia Tech when he posted 12 tackles, two sacks, two fumble recoveries, three stops for loss and tackled a punt returner in the end zone for a safety.

Taylor also started for the Akron Zips men's basketball team. In 2004, he became the third person ever inducted into Akron's Ring of Honor. He majored in political science and criminal justice.

== Professional career ==
Pre-draft measurables
Height	Weight	Arm length	Hand span	40-yard dash	10-yard split	20-yard split	20-yard shuttle	Three-cone drill	Vertical jump	Broad jump	Bench press
6 ft 6 in (1.98 m)	243 lb (110 kg)	34 5/8 in (0.88 m)	10 in (0.25 m)	4.67 s	1.61 s	2.73 s	4.07 s	7.27 s	32.0 in (0.81 m)	9 ft 3 in (2.82 m)	18 reps
All values from NFL Combine

=== Miami Dolphins (first stint) ===
==== 1997–1999 ====
Taylor was drafted by the Miami Dolphins in the third round (73rd pick overall) of the 1997 NFL draft. Taylor signed a four-year deal worth approximately $1.3 million in July 1997. From there he established himself as one of the premier defensive ends in the league. He became a starter in his rookie season and recorded five sacks and forced two fumbles.

The following season, 1998, Taylor recorded nine sacks and batted away eight passes. In 1999 Taylor grabbed the first of his eight career NFL interceptions.

==== 2000–2003 ====
On April 15, 2000, Taylor, a restricted free agent, received a one-year tender that earned him $1.027 million in 2000. Taylor responded with 73 tackles, 14.5 sacks, and 6 passes batted for the Dolphins that season. His performance was rewarded with his first selection to the Pro Bowl.

On July 24, 2001, he signed a six-year, $42 million contract to remain with the Dolphins. The new contract replaced the one-year, $5.39 million deal the Dolphins tendered Taylor in February 2001, when he was designated their franchise player. In 2001 Taylor recorded 70 tackles (15 for a loss), 8.5 sacks and swatted away eight passes.

In 2002, Taylor led the NFL and tied the Dolphin team record for sacks with 18.5. He also forced seven fumbles and knocked down eight more passes to go with his 69 tackles. He was a consensus All-Pro selection and returned to the Pro Bowl. The next season (2003) Taylor followed up his All-Pro performances with a 13-sack season.

==== 2004–2005 ====
On March 1, 2004, the Dolphins, in an effort to create more salary cap space, agreed to a three-year contract extension with Taylor. The extension put Taylor under contract through the 2009 season. The new deal (which replaced his 6-year, $42 million contract that was scheduled to expire in 2006) was worth $45 million over the 2004–2009 seasons, including nearly $10 million guaranteed in 2004. In 2004 Taylor had 68 tackles, 9.5 sacks, batted 11 passes and picked off a pass. He followed that up with a 73-tackle, 12-sack showing in 2005. He also knocked down 10 passes and forced four fumbles.

==== 2006 ====
Taylor enjoyed one of the best years of his career in 2006 when he recorded 13.5 sacks, 9 forced fumbles, 2 fumble recoveries, and two interceptions (both of which were returned for touchdowns), an effort which resulted in his selection as the 2006 NFL Defensive Player of the Year. On January 5, 2007, Taylor received 22 votes from a panel of 50 sportswriters and broadcasters who cover the NFL. Taylor beat Denver Broncos cornerback Champ Bailey, who received 16 votes. Shawne Merriman received six votes, and the winner of the award in 2005, Brian Urlacher of the Chicago Bears, received four votes. Taylor was also named a consensus All-Pro for the second time in his career.

==== 2007 ====
In 2007 Taylor reached double-digits in sacks for the sixth time in his career and picked off another pass (the 7th of his career, and the 3rd returned for a TD). Five of his FRs he has returned for TDs, which is an NFL record shared with former Atlanta Falcons linebacker Jessie Tuggle. With eight career defensive TDs (three on INT returns, five on FR returns), Taylor became the all-time leader in defensive touchdowns scored by a defensive lineman. He has also registered two career safeties and has two career field goal blocks.

In 2007 Taylor was voted to the All-time Miami Dolphins team in a poll of Dolphins fans. He was a First-team selection at defensive end along with Bill Stanfill.

=== Washington Redskins ===
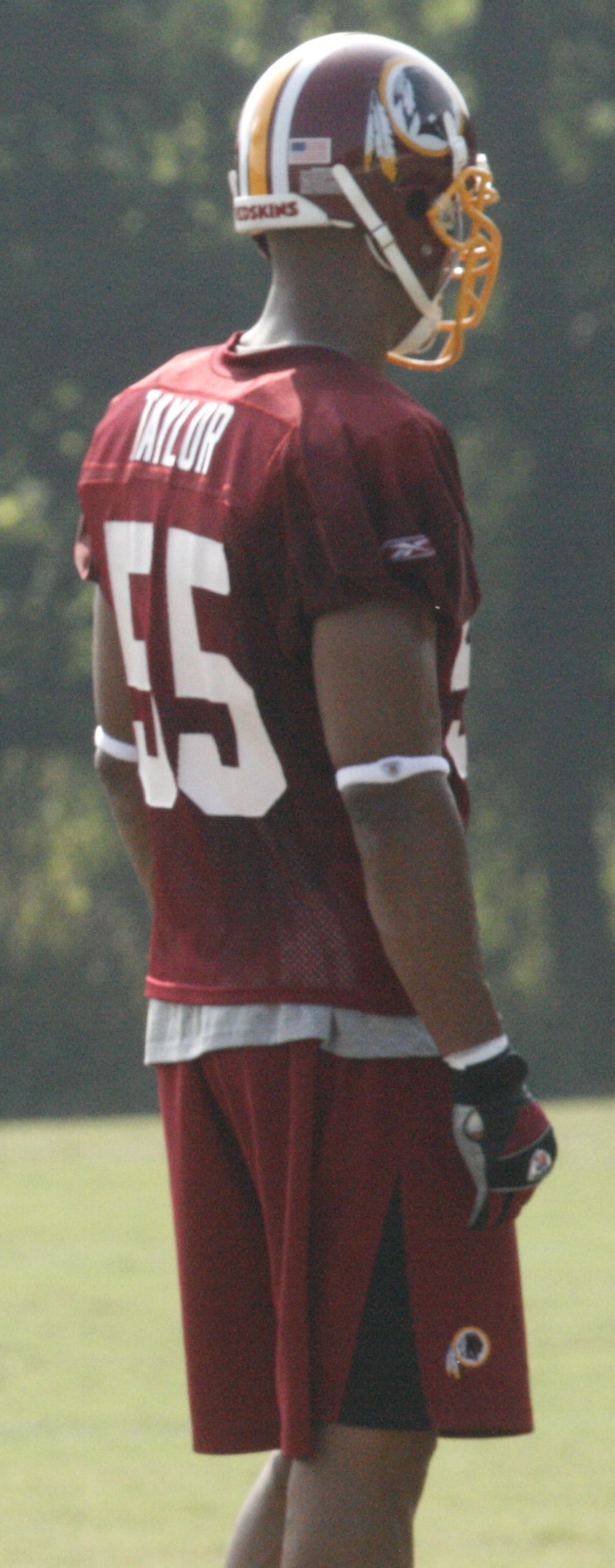
Taylor during the Redskins' training camp in 2008

Miami Dolphins General Manager Jeff Ireland admitted that there were trade discussions regarding veteran defensive end Taylor. Jacksonville Jaguars coach Jack Del Rio acknowledged speaking to the Dolphins about Taylor, "They had a certain price in mind and nobody in the league was interested in that price". On Monday April 28, 2008, The Miami Herald reported that Dolphin President Bill Parcells was displeased that Taylor skipped the Dolphins voluntary off-season workouts to be on Dancing with the Stars and that when "Taylor walked into a room where Parcells was watching tape, and Parcells ignored him". Taylor was reportedly "incensed". Ireland, on Sunday, April 27, 2008, said that the Dolphins want Taylor back for the 2008 season and regard him as a team leader.

On Saturday, April 26, 2008, The St. Petersburg Times reported that the Tampa Bay Buccaneers had agreed to trade at least a second-round pick, and perhaps others, to the Dolphins for Taylor. However, when the second-round pick was traded to Jacksonville, the paper removed the story from its website. Buccaneers coach Jon Gruden, when asked about trade talks stated, "There have been some trade rumors and I don’t think we’re any different than anybody else. When you’re talking about high-profile players, we’re going to pick up the phone and see what’s going on. It’s part of our job."

On July 20, 2008, Taylor was traded to the Washington Redskins for a second-round pick in 2009 (Pat White was selected with the pick) and a sixth-round pick in 2010. The trade came after the Redskins lost two defensive ends - Phillip Daniels and Alex Buzbee - to season-ending injuries on the first day of training camp.

On March 2, 2009, Taylor was released by the Washington Redskins for refusing to participate in off-season conditioning programs after claiming he wanted to be closer to his family in Florida.

=== Miami Dolphins (second stint) ===
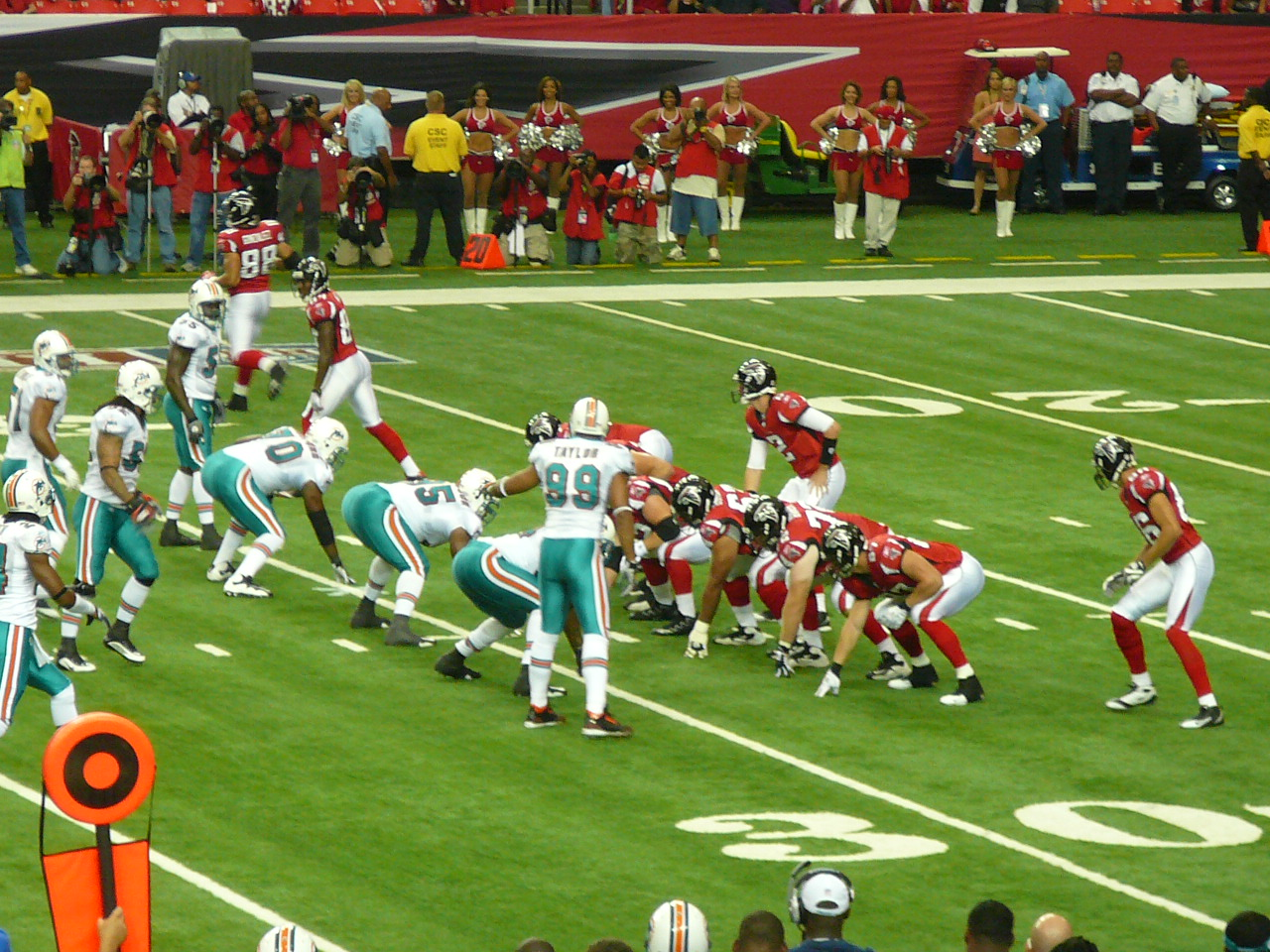
Taylor (#99) playing outside linebacker for the Dolphins in 2009

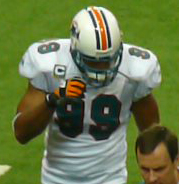
Taylor with the Dolphins in 2009

On May 13, 2009, Taylor signed a one-year deal with the Miami Dolphins for $1.1 million with $400,000 in incentives. On November 1, Taylor set the NFL record for most fumble returns for a touchdown with a 48-yard return against the Dolphins' rivals, the New York Jets, and extended his NFL record of most defensive touchdowns scored by a defensive lineman with 9 (6 on fumble returns, 3 on interception returns). In a game against Tampa Bay, Taylor also recorded his 8th and final career interception, which is second all-time for a defensive lineman.

=== New York Jets ===
Taylor signed with the New York Jets on April 20, 2010, to a two-year contract worth up to $13 million with $2.5 million guaranteed. On September 19, 2010, he sacked New England Patriots quarterback Tom Brady, giving him 128.5 sacks in his career, the 10th-most in NFL history. With 132.5 sacks at the end of the regular season, he was tied for 8th most sacks in a career with Hall of Fame linebacker Lawrence Taylor and defensive end Leslie O'Neal. On January 23, 2011, Taylor played in his first Conference Championship game in his 14-year career and recorded 2 tackles while the Jets lost, 24–19, against the Pittsburgh Steelers, falling one game short of the Super Bowl for the second straight year.

After one season with the Jets, Taylor was released on February 28, 2011.

=== Miami Dolphins (third stint) ===
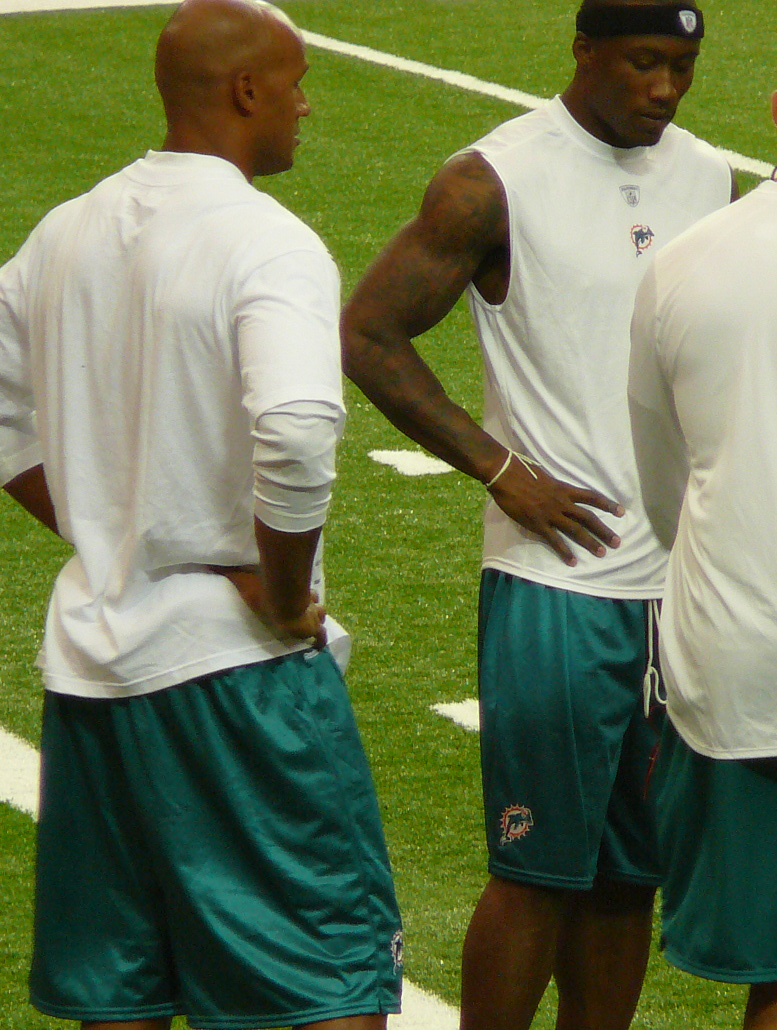
Taylor (left) with Dolphins wide receiver Brandon Marshall in 2011

On August 1, 2011, Taylor signed with the Miami Dolphins for a third stint. During a loss to the Philadelphia Eagles, Taylor sacked Michael Vick twice giving him seven sacks on the year, and also giving him the sixth-most sacks in NFL history with 139.5, just ahead of Hall of Famers John Randle and Richard Dent.

=== Retirement and broadcasting career ===
On December 28, 2011, Taylor announced that he would retire at the end of the 2011 season. He played his final game on January 1, 2012, in a 19–17 win against his former team, the New York Jets. In the game Taylor nearly returned a fumble for a touchdown, before the score was overruled. After the game ended, Taylor was ceremoniously carried off the field by his teammates. Jason retired 6th on the NFL's all-time sack list with 139.5 sacks, along with 47 career forced fumbles, 29 fumble recoveries with an NFL Record six returned for TDs, and eight career interceptions with three returned for TDs. With nine career defensive touchdowns, he is the NFL's all-time leader in that category for defensive linemen.

Taylor appeared as a guest analyst for NFL Live on June 6, 2011. On June 6, 2012, it was announced that he would join ESPN as an analyst to contribute to NFL Live, SportsCenter, NFL32 and Sunday and Monday NFL Countdown. Taylor is a board member of NFL Foundation.

On October 14, 2012, Taylor along with his teammate Zach Thomas, together became the 23rd and 24th members to be inducted into the Miami Dolphins Honor Roll.

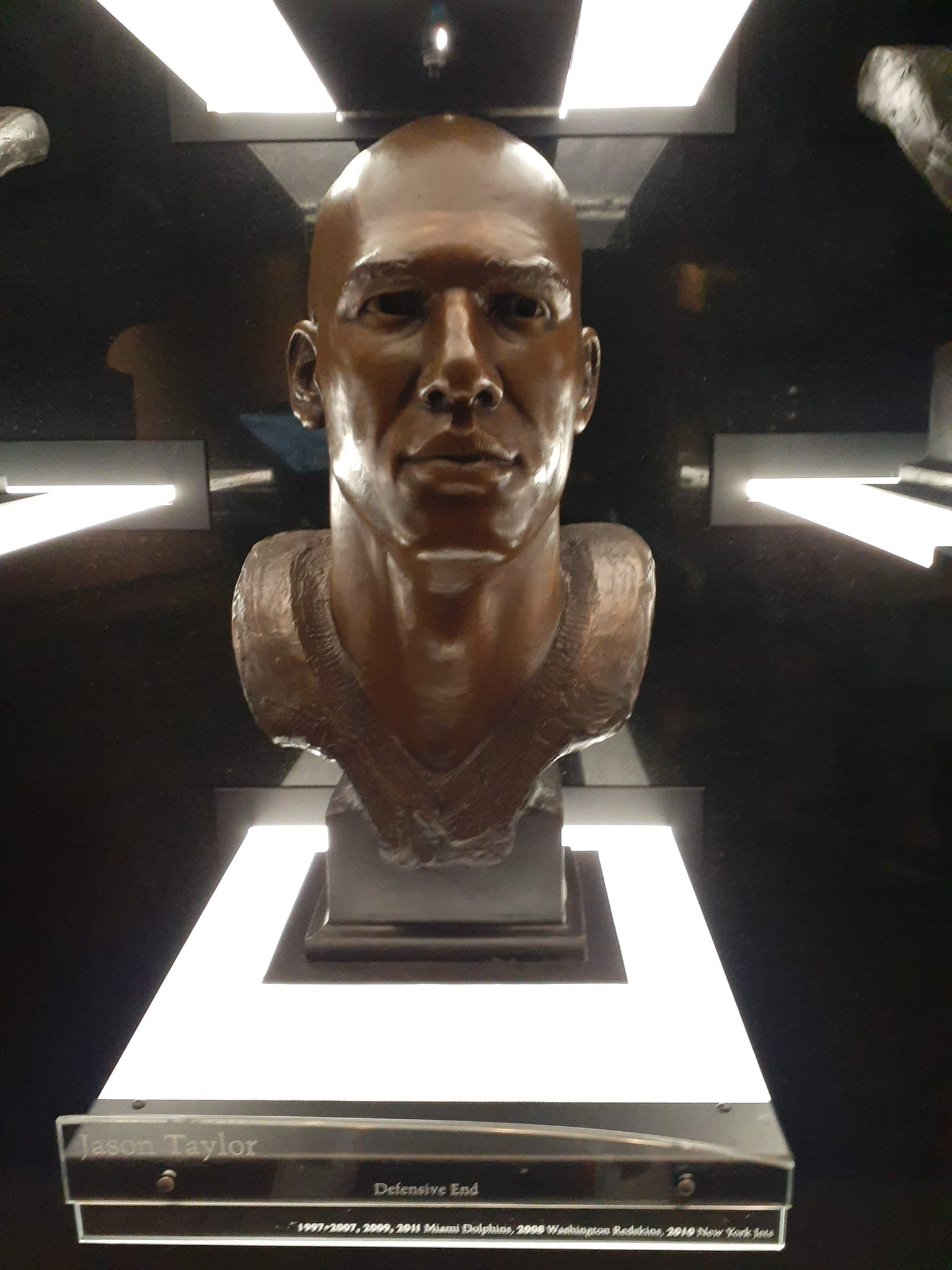
Taylor's bronze bust at the Pro Football Hall of Fame

On February 4, 2017, Taylor was elected to the Pro Football Hall of Fame in his first year of eligibility, becoming the 10th "long time" Miami Dolphin to enter Canton, and the fifth Miami Dolphin (joining Jim Langer, Paul Warfield, Don Shula and Dan Marino) to do it his first year of eligibility.

=== Awards ===
Taylor has won numerous awards throughout his career, including the 2006 NFL Defensive Player of the Year award, two AFC Defensive Player of the Year awards (2002, 2006), and the 2007 Walter Payton Man of the Year Award, the only league honor that recognizes both on-field achievements and off-the-field contributions. Taylor is also a six-time Pro Bowl selection (2000, 2002, 2004–2007), a four-time First or Second-team All-Pro (2000–2002, 2006), a two-time NFL Alumni Association Defensive Lineman of the Year (2005, 2006), and the NFL Alumni Association Pass Rusher of the Year (2000).

Taylor has also won the "AFC Defensive Player of the Week" Award seven times which is fifth most ever by a defensive player, for the following performances:

- 10/13/02 vs. Denver: 5 tackles, 2 sacks, 1 FF
- 12/15/02 vs. Oakland: 8 Tackles, 3 Sacks, 2 FFs
- 11/23/03 vs. Washington: 9 Tackles, 2 Sacks
- 11/28/04 vs. San Francisco: 7 Tackles, 3 Sacks, 1 FF, 1 FR
- 11/27/05 vs. Oakland: 6 Tackles, 3 Sacks, 1 FF, 1 FR, 1 Safety
- 11/5/06 vs. Chicago: 3 Tackles, 1 Sack, 1 FF, 1 INT returned for a TD
- 11/19/06 vs. Minnesota: 4 Tackles, 1 Sack, 2 FFs, 1 INT returned for a TD

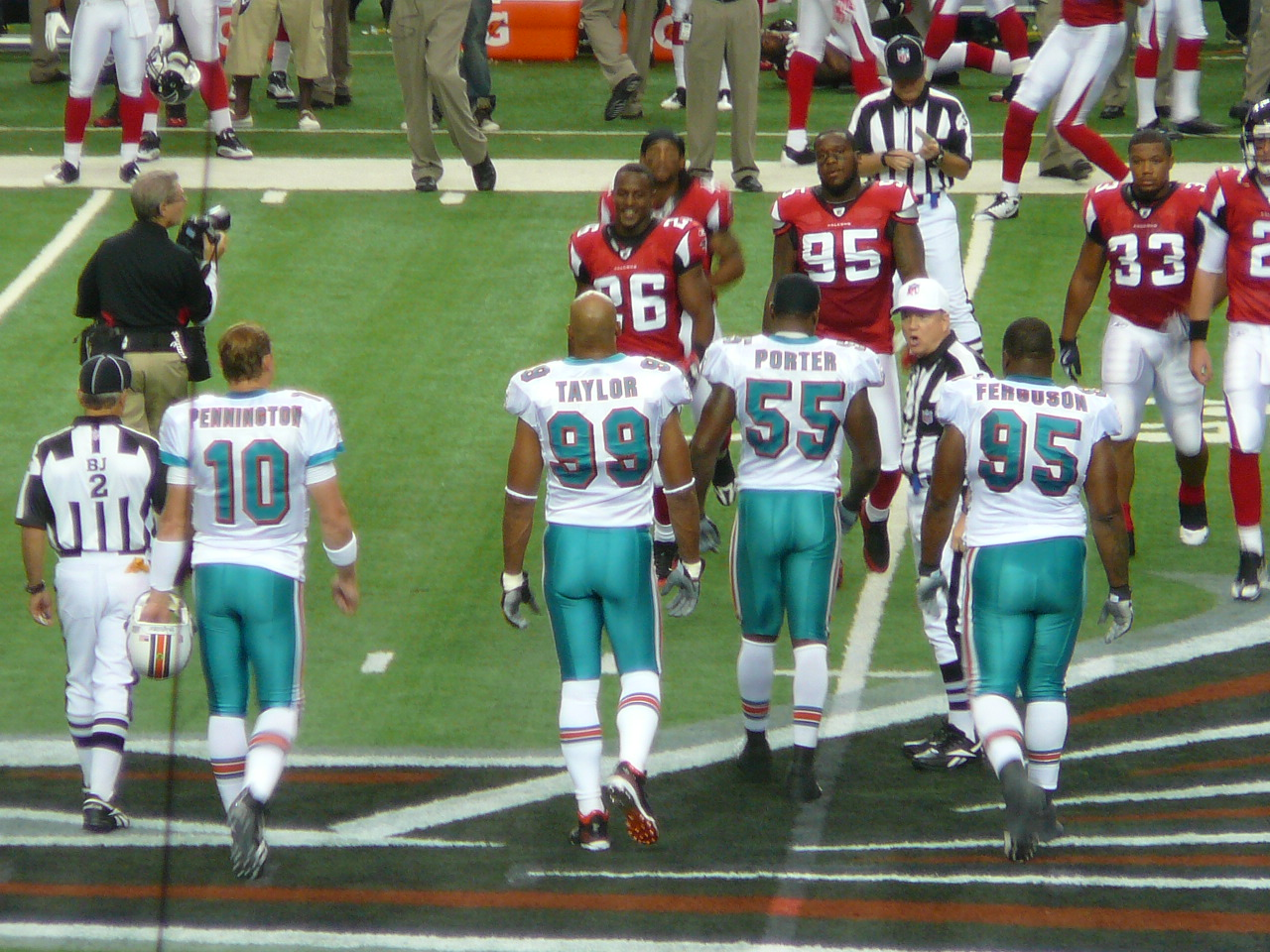
Taylor (#99) with fellow 2009 Dolphins team captains Chad Pennington, Joey Porter and Jason Ferguson

Along with winning seven "AFC Defensive Player of the Week" Awards, Taylor has won three "NFC/AFC Defensive Player of the Month" Awards, which is the third most ever by a defensive player (trailing only Bruce Smith and John Randle) for the following performances:

- October 2002 - 15 tackles, 4 sacks, 2 FFs
- November 2002 - 15 tackles, 5.5 sacks, 1 FF
- November 2006 - 9 tackles, 2 sacks, 3 FFs, 2 INTs returned for TDs, 1 blocked FG

Taylor has also won numerous team awards, including the Dolphins Newcomer of the Year Award (1997), the "Dan Marino" Team MVP Award a record four times (2000, 2002, 2004, 2006), and the "Don Shula" Team Leadership Award four times (2002, 2006–2007, 2009).

Taylor is currently one of two former Miami Dolphins (the other being Zach Thomas), where his jersey number (#99) while not officially retired, has not been reissued by the Dolphins since his retirement.

== NFL career statistics ==
Legend
	NFL Defensive Player of the Year
	NFL record
	Led the league
**Bold**	Career high

Year	Team	Games		Tackles				Fumbles				Interceptions					
Year	Team	GP	GS	Cmb	Solo	Ast	Sck	FF	FR	Yds	TD	Int	Yds	Avg	Lng	TD	PD
1997	MIA	13	11	39	27	12	5.0	2	2	0	0	0	0	0.0	0	0	4
1998	MIA	16	15	50	34	16	9.0	4	0	0	0	0	0	0.0	0	0	8
1999	MIA	15	15	40	24	16	2.5	0	2	4	**1**	1	0	0.0	0	0	4
2000	MIA	16	16	66	37	**29**	14.5	2	**4**	29	**1**	1	2	2.0	2	0	6
2001	MIA	16	16	70	47	23	8.5	4	**4**	7	**1**	1	4	4.0	4	0	7
2002	MIA	16	16	69	45	24	**18.5**	7	2	5	0	0	0	0.0	0	0	8
2003	MIA	16	16	57	37	20	13.0	3	2	34	**1**	0	0	0.0	0	0	2
2004	MIA	16	16	67	40	27	9.5	2	3	1	0	1	-3	-3.0	-3	0	**10**
2005	MIA	16	16	**74**	**52**	22	12.0	4	2	**85**	**1**	0	0	0.0	0	0	9
2006	MIA	16	16	61	41	20	13.5	**9**	2	33	0	**2**	**71**	35.5	**51T**	**2**	**10**
2007	MIA	16	16	56	47	9	11.0	4	3	0	0	1	36	**36.0**	36T	1	4
2008	WAS	13	8	29	21	8	3.5	1	0	0	0	0	0	0.0	0	0	9
2009	MIA	16	15	42	33	9	7.0	3	1	48	**1**	1	0	0.0	0	0	5
2010	NYJ	16	5	36	25	11	5.0	2	2	0	0	0	0	0.0	0	0	6
2011	MIA	16	2	18	13	5	7.0	1	0	0	0	0	0	0.0	0	0	2
Career		233	199	774	523	251	139.5	48	29	246	6	8	110	13.8	51T	3	94

== Dancing with the Stars ==
- Week 1: Taylor and partner Edyta Sliwinska performed the foxtrot and received a score of 22 out of 30 from the judges.
- Week 2: Taylor and Sliwinska's Mambo received a score of 27. They were asked to perform the encore on the results show.
- Week 3: Taylor's Jive garnered a score of 23 from the judges.
- Week 4: Taylor and Sliwinska danced a Viennese Waltz.
- Week 5: Taylor and Sliwinska performed a Rumba, scoring a 27.
- Week 6: Taylor and Sliwinska danced the Cha-cha-cha and scored a 24.
- Week 7: First, Taylor danced the Quickstep to a score of 29, then he and Sliwinska danced the Paso Doble to the NFL Monday Night Football theme for a score of 26. The combined score of 55 was tops among all dancing duos for Week 7. They were asked to perform their Quickstep as an encore on the results show.
- Week 8: Taylor and Sliwinska first danced the Tango and scored a 29. Then they danced the Samba and scored a 23 for a total score of 52.
- Week 10: Taylor and Sliwinska danced and got their first perfect score 30/30 as they finished runner-up to winners Kristi Yamaguchi and Mark Ballas.

=== Performances ===
Week no.	Dance and song	Judges' score			Result
Week no.	Dance and song	Inaba	Goodman	Tonioli	Result
1	Foxtrot/ "Pride and Joy"	7	8	7	Safe
2	Mambo/ "Lupita"	9	9	9	Safe
3	Jive/ "I Got a Woman"	8	7	8	Safe
4	Viennese Waltz/ "It's a Man's Man's Man's World"	10	9	10	Safe
5	Rumba/ "You're All I Need To Get By"	9	9	9	Safe
6	Cha-Cha-Cha/ "Best of My Love"	8	8	8	Safe
7	Quickstep/ "The Dirty Boogie"; Paso Doble/ "Heavy Action"	10; 9	9; 8	10; 9	Safe
8	Tango/ "Tango Barbaro"; Samba/ "It Had Better Be Tonight"	10; 8	9; 7	10; 8	Last to be Called Safe
9 Semi-finals	Foxtrot/ "Let's Call The Whole Thing Off"; Paso Doble/ "El Gato Montes"	9; 9	10; 9	9; 9	Safe
10; Finals	Cha-Cha-Cha/ "Dancing on the Ceiling"; Freestyle/ "Miami"; Quickstep/ "The Dirty Boogie"	8; 9; 10	8; 9; 10	8; 9; 10	Runner-Up

== Charity work ==
In 2004, Taylor and his first wife Katina founded the Jason Taylor Foundation with the goal of improving the lives of children in South Florida. The foundation has launched the Jason Taylor Reading Room, an after-school program aimed at increasing literacy among inner city children; renamed the Holtz Children's Hospital's learning center as "The Jason Taylor Children's Learning Center"; provided 11 sixth-grade students with college scholarships through the Take Stock in Children organization; created the "Big Screens-Big Dreams" program to screen inspirational films for hundreds of student-athletes; and furnished 60 children with $300 back-to-school shopping certificates as part of the "Cool Gear for the School Year" program.

Taylor has also partnered with the Invicta Watch Group and its CEO, Eyal Lalo, on a number of charitable ventures and was given the opportunity to create a collection of limited edition of watches. He said, "As a watch enthusiast and collector, I am excited to be partnering with Invicta on the development and launch of my collection of watches."

== Personal life ==
Taylor and his ex-wife Katina, who is the sister of Taylor's former teammate Zach Thomas, have three children: sons Isaiah and Mason, and daughter Zoe. Katina filed for divorce twice in 2006, citing irreconcilable differences and asking for custody of the children, but withdrew the petitions both times. The couple quietly divorced in Key West, Florida in 2015.

Taylor became engaged to Monica Taylor on July 2, 2019. They married on August 18, 2020. They were expecting their first child together, a baby boy, in August 2021.

Taylor lives in the Fort Lauderdale suburb of Plantation. Taylor's sister Joy Taylor is the former news anchor on The Herd with Colin Cowherd on Fox Sports 1. His son Mason played college football at LSU and was drafted by the New York Jets in the second round of the 2025 NFL draft, while his son Isaiah plays for the University of Miami after previously playing at Arizona.

== Coaching career ==
Taylor coached at St. Thomas Aquinas High School (Florida) for five years from 2017 to 2021, his first three as the team's defensive line coach, and his last two as the team's defensive coordinator. During Taylor's tenure, St. Thomas Aquinas High School won three consecutive state championships from 2019 to 2021.

In 2022, Taylor made the jump to collegiate coaching, joining Mario Cristobal's staff at the University of Miami (FL) as a defensive analyst. The following year in 2023, Taylor was promoted to being the team's defensive ends coach.

Awards and achievements
Preceded by Mel B & Maksim Chmerkovskiy	Dancing with the Stars (US) runner up Season 6 (Spring 2008 with Edyta Śliwińska)	Succeeded by Warren Sapp & Kym Johnson
