= Daryl Gardener =

American football player (born 1973)

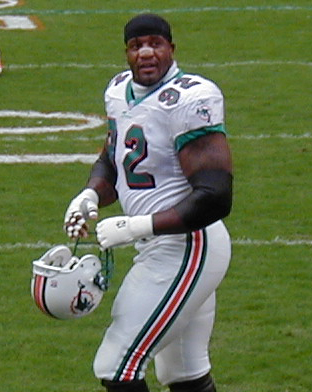
- Gardner with the Miami Dolphins

No. 92, 99
- Position: Defensive tackle

Personal information
- Born: February 25, 1973 (age 53); Baltimore, Maryland, U.S.
- Listed height: 6 ft 6 in (1.98 m)
- Listed weight: 295 lb (134 kg)

Career information
- High school: Lawton (Lawton, Oklahoma)
- College: Baylor
- NFL draft: 1996: 1st round, 20th overall pick

Career history
- Miami Dolphins (1996–2001); Washington Redskins (2002); Denver Broncos (2003)

Awards and highlights
- First-team All-SWC (1995)

Career NFL statistics
- Total tackles: 311
- Sacks: 19
- Forced fumbles: 3
- Fumble recoveries: 5
- Interceptions: 1
- Stats at Pro Football Reference

Daryl Ronald Gardener (born February 25, 1973) is an American former professional football player who was a defensive tackle in the National Football League (NFL) for the Miami Dolphins, Washington Redskins, and Denver Broncos. He played college football at Baylor University and was selected in the first round (20th overall) of the 1996 NFL draft by the Miami Dolphins in a spot Ray Lewis thought was sure to be his.

On June 28, 2011, Gardener was arrested and charged with domestic-violence battery after he allegedly head butted his girlfriend during an argument.

== NFL career statistics ==
Legend
**Bold**	Career high

=== Regular season ===
Year	Team	Games		Tackles				Interceptions				Fumbles			
Year	Team	GP	GS	Comb	Solo	Ast	Sck	Int	Yds	TD	Lng	FF	FR	Yds	TD
1996	MIA	16	12	32	23	9	1.0	0	0	0	0	0	1	0	0
1997	MIA	16	16	**52**	32	20	1.5	0	0	0	0	**1**	1	0	0
1998	MIA	16	16	39	27	12	1.0	**1**	-1	0	-1	0	0	0	0
1999	MIA	16	15	51	29	**22**	**5.0**	0	0	0	0	**1**	1	**33**	0
2000	MIA	10	10	49	35	14	2.5	0	0	0	0	0	0	0	0
2001	MIA	8	8	28	17	11	4.0	0	0	0	0	**1**	0	0	0
2002	WAS	15	15	**52**	**45**	7	4.0	0	0	0	0	0	**2**	0	0
2003	DEN	5	2	8	5	3	0.0	0	0	0	0	0	0	0	0
Career		102	94	311	213	98	19.0	1	-1	0	0	3	5	33	0

=== Playoffs ===
Year	Team	Games		Tackles				Interceptions				Fumbles			
Year	Team	GP	GS	Comb	Solo	Ast	Sck	Int	Yds	TD	Lng	FF	FR	Yds	TD
1997	MIA	1	1	6	4	2	**1.0**	0	0	0	0	0	0	0	0
1998	MIA	2	2	6	**5**	1	0.5	0	0	0	0	0	0	0	0
1999	MIA	2	2	4	3	1	0.0	0	0	0	0	0	0	0	0
2000	MIA	2	2	**9**	3	**6**	0.0	0	0	0	0	0	0	0	0
Career		7	7	25	15	10	1.5	0	0	0	0	0	0	0	0
