= Shawn Wooden (American football) =

American football player (born 1973)

No. 22
- Position: Safety

Personal information
- Born: October 23, 1973 (age 53); Philadelphia, Pennsylvania, U.S.
- Listed height: 5 ft 11 in (1.80 m)
- Listed weight: 205 lb (93 kg)

Career information
- College: Notre Dame
- NFL draft: 1996: 6th round, 189th overall pick

Career history
- Miami Dolphins (1996–1999); Chicago Bears (2000); Miami Dolphins (2001–2004)

Career NFL statistics
- Total tackles: 310
- Forced fumbles: 2
- Fumble recoveries: 8
- Interceptions: 5
- Stats at Pro Football Reference

Shawn Wooden (born October 23, 1973) is an American former professional football player who was a safety for nine seasons in the National Football League (NFL) with the Miami Dolphins and the Chicago Bears. He played college football for the Notre Dame Fighting Irish and was selected in the sixth round by Jimmy Johnson, the then-coach of the Miami Dolphins. Wooden played for the Dolphins for four seasons and then signed a free agent contract with the Chicago Bears in the 2000 football season. After one year with the Bears, he returned to the Miami Dolphins for the remainder of his career. He is currently a financial advisor with Wooden Wealth Strategies.

== Football career ==
Wooden attended Abington Senior High School, where he played as running back in his senior season. He then accepted a full scholarship to the University of Notre Dame, where he started as a cornerback. One of the highlights of his college career came when he broke up Charlie Ward's final pass, resulting in Notre Dame's (ranked #2 at the time) defeat of the Florida State (ranked #1 at the time) in a nationally televised game in 1993 which was coined at that time the "Game of the Century". As a student-athlete he earned a bachelor's degree in Computer Science. Wooden was drafted in the 1996 NFL draft by the Miami Dolphins in the sixth round with the 189th overall pick. He had a nine-year professional career, playing for the Miami Dolphins and Chicago Bears.

== NFL career statistics ==
Legend
| **Bold** | Career high |

=== Regular season ===
| Year | Team | Games | | Tackles | | | | Interceptions | | | | Fumbles | | | |
| Year | Team | GP | GS | Comb | Solo | Ast | Sck | Int | Yds | TD | Lng | FF | FR | Yds | TD |
|---|---|---|---|---|---|---|---|---|---|---|---|---|---|---|---|
| 1996 | MIA | 16 | 11 | 67 | 54 | 13 | 0.0 | **2** | **15** | 0 | **15** | 0 | **2** | 0 | 0 |
| 1997 | MIA | 16 | 15 | **83** | **56** | **27** | 0.0 | **2** | 10 | 0 | 10 | 0 | **2** | 0 | 0 |
| 1998 | MIA | 2 | 1 | 10 | 10 | 0 | 0.0 | 0 | 0 | 0 | 0 | **1** | 0 | 0 | 0 |
| 1999 | MIA | 15 | 6 | 73 | 54 | 19 | 0.0 | 0 | 0 | 0 | 0 | 0 | **2** | 0 | 0 |
| 2000 | CHI | 11 | 0 | 18 | 14 | 4 | 0.0 | 0 | 0 | 0 | 0 | **1** | 1 | **3** | 0 |
| 2001 | MIA | 13 | 0 | 16 | 16 | 0 | 0.0 | 0 | 0 | 0 | 0 | 0 | 0 | 0 | 0 |
| 2002 | MIA | 16 | 2 | 34 | 23 | 11 | 0.0 | 1 | 0 | 0 | 0 | 0 | 0 | 0 | 0 |
| 2003 | MIA | 15 | 0 | 9 | 6 | 3 | 0.0 | 0 | 0 | 0 | 0 | 0 | 1 | 0 | 0 |
| | | 104 | 35 | 310 | 233 | 77 | 0.0 | 5 | 25 | 0 | 15 | 2 | 8 | 3 | 0 |

=== Playoffs ===
| Year | Team | Games | | Tackles | | | | Interceptions | | | | Fumbles | | | |
| Year | Team | GP | GS | Comb | Solo | Ast | Sck | Int | Yds | TD | Lng | FF | FR | Yds | TD |
|---|---|---|---|---|---|---|---|---|---|---|---|---|---|---|---|
| 1997 | MIA | 1 | 1 | 6 | 3 | **3** | 0.0 | 0 | 0 | 0 | 0 | 0 | 0 | 0 | 0 |
| 1999 | MIA | 2 | 2 | **11** | **10** | 1 | 0.0 | 0 | 0 | 0 | 0 | **1** | **1** | 0 | 0 |
| 2001 | MIA | 1 | 0 | 0 | 0 | 0 | 0.0 | 0 | 0 | 0 | 0 | 0 | 0 | 0 | 0 |
| | | 4 | 3 | 17 | 13 | 4 | 0.0 | 0 | 0 | 0 | 0 | 1 | 1 | 0 | 0 |

== Post-football career ==
He is well known in the South Florida community for his volunteer work with various charities and organizations. He was forced to retire in 2004 due to a back injury.
