= Derrick Rodgers =

American football player (born 1971)

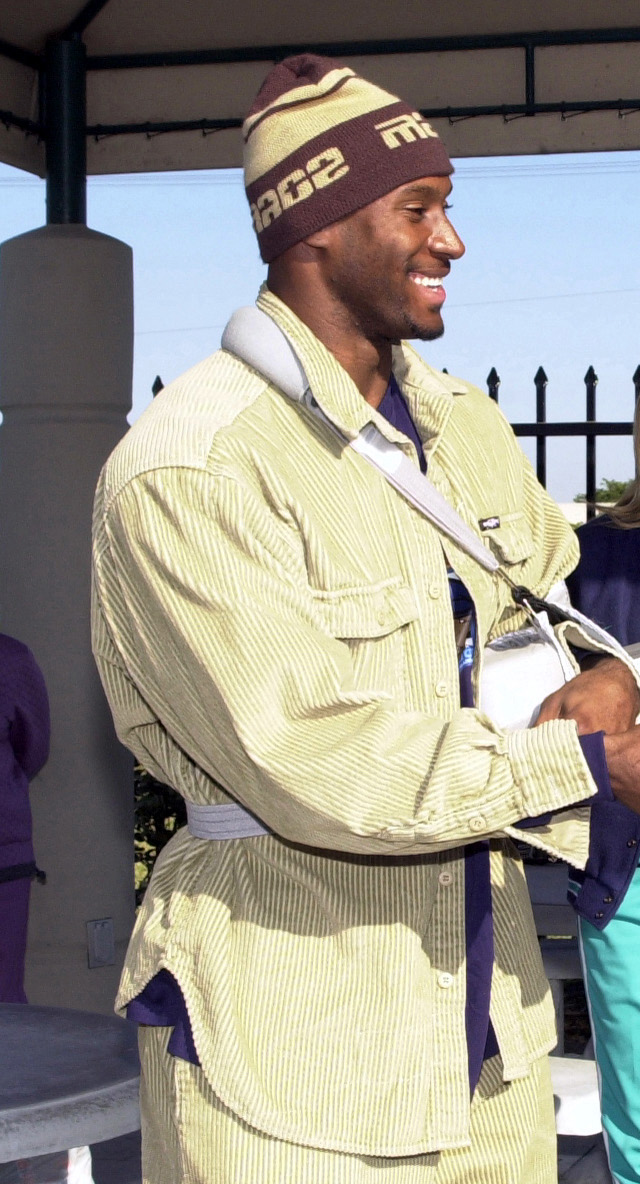
- Rodgers in 2002

No. 59
- Position: Linebacker

Personal information
- Born: October 14, 1971 (age 55); Memphis, Tennessee, U.S.
- Listed height: 6 ft 0 in (1.83 m)
- Listed weight: 230 lb (104 kg)

Career information
- High school: St. Augustine (New Orleans, Louisiana)
- College: Arizona State
- NFL draft: 1997: 3rd round, 92nd overall pick

Career history
- Miami Dolphins (1997–2002); New Orleans Saints (2003–2004)

Awards and highlights
- Consensus All-American (1996); First-team All-Pac-10 (1996)

Career NFL statistics
- Tackles: 532
- Sacks: 9
- Interceptions: 4
- Stats at Pro Football Reference

Derrick Andre Rodgers (born October 14, 1971) is an American former professional football player who was a linebacker for eight seasons in the National Football League (NFL) during the late 1990s and early 2000s. Rodgers played college football for the Arizona State Sun Devils, earning consensus All-American honors in 1996. A third-round pick in the 1997 NFL draft, he played professionally for the Miami Dolphins and New Orleans Saints of the NFL.

== Early life ==
Rodgers was born in Memphis, Tennessee. He attended St. Augustine High School, a Roman Catholic school in New Orleans, Louisiana, where he did not play high school football but was a member of the “Marching 100” high school band. After high school, Rodgers enlisted in the United States Air Force as a Medical Lab Technician.

== College career ==
After serving in the military, Derrick’s college football career began at Riverside Community College in 1994. He received All-Mission Conference honors in 1995 and an athletic scholarship to attend Arizona State University in 1996, and played for the Arizona State Sun Devils football team. As a junior in 1996, Rodgers was recognized as a consensus first-team All-American as a defensive lineman.

== Professional career ==
The Miami Dolphins selected Rodgers in the third round (92nd pick overall) of the 1997 NFL draft. He played for the Dolphins from 1997 to 2002. He finished his NFL career playing for the New Orleans Saints in 2003 and 2004. In eight NFL seasons, he played in 116 regular season games, started 111 of them, and compiled 507 tackles, nine quarterback sacks and four interceptions.

== NFL career statistics ==
Legend
**Bold**	Career high

=== Regular season ===
Year	Team	Games		Tackles				Interceptions				Fumbles			
Year	Team	GP	GS	Comb	Solo	Ast	Sck	Int	Yds	TD	Lng	FF	FR	Yds	TD
1997	MIA	15	14	80	56	24	**5.0**	0	0	0	0	**3**	1	0	0
1998	MIA	16	16	47	26	21	2.5	0	0	0	0	0	0	0	0
1999	MIA	16	15	39	23	16	0.0	1	5	0	5	0	**2**	0	0
2000	MIA	16	14	**89**	**64**	25	0.5	0	0	0	0	1	0	0	0
2001	MIA	14	14	71	44	27	1.0	0	0	0	0	0	0	0	0
2002	MIA	16	15	76	46	**30**	0.0	**2**	28	0	21	0	0	0	0
2003	NOR	15	15	75	57	18	0.0	1	**40**	**1**	**40**	0	**2**	**3**	0
2004	NOR	8	8	55	44	11	0.0	0	0	0	0	1	0	0	0
		116	111	532	360	172	9.0	4	73	1	40	5	5	3	0

=== Playoffs ===
Year	Team	Games		Tackles				Interceptions				Fumbles			
Year	Team	GP	GS	Comb	Solo	Ast	Sck	Int	Yds	TD	Lng	FF	FR	Yds	TD
1997	MIA	1	0	6	4	2	0.0	0	0	0	0	0	0	0	0
1998	MIA	2	2	5	3	2	**0.5**	0	0	0	0	0	0	0	0
1999	MIA	2	2	7	6	1	0.0	0	0	0	0	0	0	0	0
2000	MIA	2	2	**13**	**10**	**3**	0.0	0	0	0	0	0	0	0	0
		7	6	31	23	8	0.5	0	0	0	0	0	0	0	0
