= 2003 Pro Bowl =

National Football League all-star game

2003 NFL Pro Bowl
NFC	AFC
20	45
Head coach: Andy Reid (Philadelphia Eagles)	Head coach: Jeff Fisher (Tennessee Titans)
	1	2	3	4	Total
NFC	3	3	0	14	20
AFC	14	14	3	14	45
- Date: February 2, 2003
- Stadium: Aloha Stadium; Honolulu, Hawaii
- MVP: Ricky Williams (Miami Dolphins)
- Referee: Bill Leavy
- Attendance: 50,125

Ceremonies
- National anthem: Brandy
- Halftime show: Jennifer Love Hewitt

TV in the United States
- Network: ABC
- Announcers: Al Michaels and Dan Fouts

The 2003 Pro Bowl was the NFL's all-star game for the 2002 season. The game was played on February 2, 2003, at Aloha Stadium in Honolulu, Hawaii. The final Score was AFC 45, NFC 20. Ricky Williams of the Miami Dolphins was the game's MVP.

== AFC roster ==
=== Offense ===
Position	Starter(s)	Reserve(s)	Alternate(s)
Quarterback	12 Rich Gannon, Oakland	11 Drew Bledsoe, Buffalo; 18 Peyton Manning, Indianapolis	
Running back	31 Priest Holmes, Kansas City^{[b]}	34 Ricky Williams, Miami^{[c]} 21 LaDainian Tomlinson, San Diego	20 Travis Henry, Buffalo^{[a]}
Fullback	41 Lorenzo Neal, Cincinnati		
Wide receiver	88 Marvin Harrison, Indianapolis; 80 Jerry Rice, Oakland	80 Eric Moulds, Buffalo; 86 Hines Ward, Pittsburgh	
Tight end	88 Tony Gonzalez, Kansas City	86 Todd Heap, Baltimore	
Offensive tackle	75 Jonathan Ogden, Baltimore; 77 Willie Roaf, Kansas City	72 Lincoln Kennedy, Oakland	
Offensive guard	66 Alan Faneca, Pittsburgh; 68 Will Shields, Kansas City	79 Ruben Brown, Buffalo	
Center	68 Kevin Mawae, N.Y. Jets	63 Barret Robbins, Oakland^{[b]}	65 Damien Woody, New England^{[a]}

=== Defense ===
Position	Starter(s)	Reserve(s)	Alternate(s)
Defensive end	93 Trevor Pryce, Denver; 99 Jason Taylor, Miami	94 John Abraham, N.Y. Jets; 93 Kevin Carter, Tennessee	
Defensive tackle	93 Richard Seymour, New England; 96 Gary Walker, Houston	95 Tim Bowens, Miami	
Outside linebacker	55 Joey Porter, Pittsburgh; 55 Junior Seau, San Diego^{[b]}	58 Peter Boulware, Baltimore^{[c]}	92 Jason Gildon, Pittsburgh^{[a]}
Inside linebacker	54 Zach Thomas, Miami	56 Al Wilson, Denver^{[b]}	59 Donnie Edwards, San Diego^{[a]}
Cornerback	31 Aaron Glenn, Houston; 23 Patrick Surtain, Miami^{[b]}	24 Ty Law, New England^{[c]}	29 Sam Madison, Miami^{[a]}
Free safety	26 Rod Woodson, Oakland	31 Brock Marion, Miami	
Strong safety	36 Lawyer Milloy, New England		

=== Special teams ===
Position	Starter(s)	Reserve(s)	Alternate(s)
Punter	2 Chris Hanson, Jacksonville		
Placekicker	4 Adam Vinatieri, New England		
Kick returner	82 Dante Hall, Kansas City		
Special teamer	53 Larry Izzo, New England		

== NFC roster ==
=== Offense ===
Position	Starter(s)	Reserve(s)	Alternate(s)
Quarterback	4 Brett Favre, Green Bay^{[b]}	5 Jeff Garcia, San Francisco^{[c]} 7 Michael Vick, Atlanta^{[b]}	5 Donovan McNabb, Philadelphia^{[a]} 14 Brad Johnson, Tampa Bay^{[a]}
Running back	26 Deuce McAllister, New Orleans	28 Marshall Faulk, St. Louis; 30 Ahman Green, Green Bay^{[b]}	23 Michael Bennett, Minnesota^{[a]}
Fullback	40 Mike Alstott, Tampa Bay		
Wide receiver	87 Joe Horn, New Orleans; 81 Terrell Owens, San Francisco	86 Marty Booker, Chicago; 84 Randy Moss, Minnesota^{[b]}	80 Donald Driver, Green Bay^{[a]}
Tight end	88 Bubba Franks, Green Bay	80 Jeremy Shockey, N.Y. Giants	89 Chad Lewis, Philadelphia^{[a]}
Offensive tackle	72 Tra Thomas, Philadelphia; 71 Walter Jones, Seattle^{[b]}	76 Orlando Pace, St. Louis^{[b]}	69 Jon Runyan, Philadelphia^{[a]} 60 Chris Samuels, Washington^{[c]}
Offensive guard	68 Jermane Mayberry, Philadelphia; 65 Ron Stone, San Francisco	62 Marco Rivera, Green Bay	
Center	57 Olin Kreutz, Chicago	62 Jeremy Newberry, San Francisco	

=== Defense ===
Position	Starter(s)	Reserve(s)	Alternate(s)
Defensive end	97 Simeon Rice, Tampa Bay; 92 Michael Strahan, N.Y. Giants	53 Hugh Douglas, Philadelphia	
Defensive tackle	97 La'Roi Glover, Dallas; 99 Warren Sapp, Tampa Bay^{[b]}	97 Bryant Young, San Francisco^{[c]}	77 Kris Jenkins, Carolina^{[a]}
Outside linebacker	56 LaVar Arrington, Washington; 55 Derrick Brooks, Tampa Bay	98 Julian Peterson, San Francisco	
Inside linebacker	54 Brian Urlacher, Chicago	56 Keith Brooking, Atlanta^{[b]}	53 Shelton Quarles, Tampa Bay^{[a]}
Cornerback	24 Champ Bailey, Washington; 23 Troy Vincent, Philadelphia	21 Bobby Taylor, Philadelphia	
Free safety	42 Darren Sharper, Green Bay	20 Brian Dawkins, Philadelphia	
Strong safety	47 John Lynch, Tampa Bay		

=== Special teams ===
Position	Starter(s)	Reserve(s)	Alternate(s)
Punter	10 Todd Sauerbrun, Carolina		
Placekicker	2 David Akers, Philadelphia		
Kick returner	84 Michael Lewis, New Orleans		
Special teamer	25 Fred McAfee, New Orleans		

== Number of selections per team ==
AFC team	Selections	NFC team	Selections
Kansas City Chiefs	5	Green Bay Packers	6
Baltimore Ravens	3	St. Louis Rams	2
Oakland Raiders	5	Dallas Cowboys	1
Pittsburgh Steelers	4	Seattle Seahawks	1
Miami Dolphins	7	Carolina Panthers	2
Denver Broncos	2	Minnesota Vikings	2
New England Patriots	6	Tampa Bay Buccaneers	6
San Diego Chargers	3	Chicago Bears	3
Buffalo Bills	4	Philadelphia Eagles	10
Cincinnati Bengals	1	San Francisco 49ers	6
New York Jets	2	Washington Redskins	3
Jacksonville Jaguars	1	Atlanta Falcons	2
Tennessee Titans	1	New Orleans Saints	4
Houston Texans	2	New York Giants	2
Indianapolis Colts	2	Arizona Cardinals	0
Cleveland Browns	0	Detroit Lions	0

Notes:

^{a} Replacement selection due to injury or vacancy
^{b} Injured player; selected but did not play
^{c} Replacement starter; selected as reserve
^{d} "Need player"; named by coach
