= Ray Nealy =

American football player (born 1975)

No. 20
- Position: Fullback

Personal information
- Born: April 30, 1975 (age 51); Little Rock, Arkansas, U.S.
- Listed height: 5 ft 11 in (1.80 m)
- Listed weight: 220 lb (100 kg)

Career information
- High school: Little Rock Central
- College: Arkansas–Pine Bluff
- NFL draft: 1997: undrafted

Career history
- Miami Dolphins (1997–1998)
- Stats at Pro Football Reference

Ray T. Nealy (born April 30, 1975) is an American former professional football fullback who played for the Miami Dolphins of the National Football League (NFL). He played college football for the Arkansas–Pine Bluff Golden Lions.

== Early life ==
Ray T. Nealy was born on April 30, 1975, in Little Rock, Arkansas. He attended Little Rock Central High School.

== College career ==
Nealy enrolled at the University of Arkansas at Pine Bluff to play college football for the Golden Lions. He rushed for 1,130 yards and 12 touchdowns as a junior in 1995, earning All-American honors. Going into the 1996 season, NFL draft analyst Dave Thomas rated Nealy as the third-best running back in the country, behind first-ranked Sedrick Shaw and second-ranked Warrick Dunn. Nealy finished his college career with 3,012 rushing yards, the most in school history. He played in the 1996 Blue–Gray Football Classic, a college football all-star game, and scored a four-yard rushing touchdown. He was inducted into the school's athletics hall of fame in 2013.

== Professional career ==
After going undrafted in the 1997 NFL draft, Nealy signed with the Miami Dolphins on April 24. He was released on August 18, signed to the practice squad on August 26, and promoted to the active roster on November 19. He played in one game for the Dolphins during the 1997 season as a reserve fullback, rushing once for two yards.

Nealy was released again on August 30, 1998, and signed to the practice squad the next day. He was released for the final time on November 4, 1998.
