= Brian Manning (American football) =

American football player (born 1975)

No. 82, 83
- Position: Wide receiver

Personal information
- Born: April 22, 1975 (age 51); Kansas City, Kansas, U.S.
- Listed height: 5 ft 11 in (1.80 m)
- Listed weight: 188 lb (85 kg)

Career information
- High school: Ruskin (Kansas City, Missouri)
- College: Stanford
- NFL draft: 1997: 6th round, 170th overall pick

Career history
- Miami Dolphins (1997); Green Bay Packers (1998); Chicago Bears (1999)*
- * Offseason or practice squad member only

Career NFL statistics
- Receptions: 7
- Receiving yards: 85
- Stats at Pro Football Reference

Brian Keith Manning (born April 22, 1975) is an American former professional football player who was a wide receiver in the National Football League (NFL) for the Miami Dolphins and the Green Bay Packers. Manning played college football for the Stanford Cardinal before being selected by the Dolphins in the sixth round of the 1997 NFL draft. He played professionally for 2 seasons from 1997 to 1998.
