= Larry Shannon =

American football player (born 1975)

No. 19, 82
- Position: Wide receiver

Personal information
- Born: February 2, 1975 (age 51); Gainesville, Florida, U.S.
- Listed height: 6 ft 4 in (1.93 m)
- Listed weight: 215 lb (98 kg)

Career information
- High school: Bradford (Starke, Florida)
- College: East Carolina
- NFL draft: 1998: 3rd round, 82nd overall pick

Career history
- Miami Dolphins (1998–1999); Oakland Raiders (2000); Jacksonville Jaguars (2002)*
- * Offseason or practice squad member only
- Stats at Pro Football Reference

Larry David Shannon, Jr. (born February 2, 1975) is an American former professional football player who was a wide receiver of the National Football League (NFL). He was selected by the Miami Dolphins in the third round of the 1998 NFL draft with the 82nd overall pick. He played college football for the East Carolina Pirates.

Shannon was also a member of the Oakland Raiders and Jacksonville Jaguars.

He is now an assistant football coach at Venice High School in Venice, Florida.

He is now a teacher at Venice High School. He teaches engineering.
