= Frank Wainright =

American football player (1967–2016)

No. 87, 82, 88
- Position: Tight end

Personal information
- Born: October 10, 1967; Peoria, Illinois, U.S.
- Died: April 5, 2016 (aged 48); Castle Pines, Colorado, U.S.
- Listed height: 6 ft 2 in (1.88 m)
- Listed weight: 255 lb (116 kg)

Career information
- High school: Pomona (Arvada, Colorado)
- College: Northern Colorado
- NFL draft: 1991: 8th round, 210th overall pick

Career history
- New Orleans Saints (1991–1994); Denver Broncos (1995)*; Philadelphia Eagles (1995); Miami Dolphins (1995–1998); Baltimore Ravens (1999–2000)
- * Offseason or practice squad member only

Awards and highlights
- Super Bowl champion (XXXV)

Career NFL statistics
- Receptions: 11
- Receiving yards: 148
- Touchdowns: 1
- Stats at Pro Football Reference

Frank Wesley Wainright (October 10, 1967 – April 5, 2016) was an American professional football tight end in the National Football League (NFL) for ten seasons for the New Orleans Saints, Philadelphia Eagles, Miami Dolphins, and Baltimore Ravens. He played high school his freshman through junior year at Peoria Heights High School. He played college football at the University of Northern Colorado and was drafted 210th overall in the eighth round of the 1991 NFL draft.

Wainright is one of at least 345 NFL players to be diagnosed after death with chronic traumatic encephalopathy (CTE), which is caused by repeated hits to the head.
