= Anthony Harris (linebacker) =

American football player (born 1973)

No. 51
- Position: Linebacker

Personal information
- Born: January 25, 1973 (age 53); Fort Pierce, Florida, U.S.
- Listed height: 6 ft 1 in (1.85 m)
- Listed weight: 240 lb (109 kg)

Career information
- High school: Fort Pierce Westwood (Fort Pierce, Florida)
- College: Auburn University

Career history
- Miami Dolphins (1996–1999); Green Bay Packers (2000}*; Cleveland Browns (2001)*
- * Offseason or practice squad member only

Awards and highlights
- Second-team All-SEC (1994)

Career statistics
- Tackles: 65
- Sacks: 1
- Stats at Pro Football Reference

Anthony Jerrod Harris (born January 25, 1973) is an American former professional football player who played linebacker for four seasons for the Miami Dolphins.

Pre-draft measurables
Height	Weight	Arm length	Hand span	40-yard dash	10-yard split	20-yard split	20-yard shuttle	Vertical jump	Broad jump	Bench press
6 ft 1 3/8 in (1.86 m)	224 lb (102 kg)	32 5/8 in (0.83 m)	10 1/8 in (0.26 m)	4.71 s	1.68 s	2.74 s	4.45 s	31.0 in (0.79 m)	9 ft 3 in (2.82 m)	17 reps
All values from NFL Combine
