= Jeff Buckey =

American football player (born 1974)

No. 77, 71, 70
- Position: Guard

Personal information
- Born: August 7, 1974 (age 52); Bakersfield, California, U.S.
- Listed height: 6 ft 5 in (1.96 m)
- Listed weight: 295 lb (134 kg)

Career information
- High school: Bakersfield
- College: Stanford
- NFL draft: 1996: 7th round, 230th overall pick
- Expansion draft: 1999: 1st round, 7th overall pick

Career history
- Miami Dolphins (1996–1998); Cleveland Browns (1999)*; San Francisco 49ers (1999); San Francisco Demons (2001)
- * Offseason or practice squad member only

Career NFL statistics
- Games played: 45
- Games started: 13
- Stats at Pro Football Reference

Jeffery Michael Buckey (born August 7, 1974) is an American former professional football player who was a guard for four seasons in the National Football League (NFL) with the Miami Dolphins and the San Francisco 49ers. He played college football for the Stanford Cardinal and was selected in the seventh round of the 1996 NFL draft with the 230th overall pick.

Awards
| Preceded by Bryan Bronson | Track & Field News High School Boys Athlete of the Year; 1992 | Succeeded by Calvin Harrison |
