= Ed Perry =

American football player (born 1974)

No. 89, 48
- Position: Long snapper

Personal information
- Born: September 1, 1974 (age 52); Richmond, Virginia, U.S.
- Listed height: 6 ft 4 in (1.93 m)
- Listed weight: 265 lb (120 kg)

Career information
- High school: Highland Springs (Highland Springs, Virginia)
- College: James Madison
- NFL draft: 1997: 6th round, 177th overall pick

Career history
- Miami Dolphins (1997–2004); Kansas City Chiefs (2005)

Career NFL statistics
- Receptions: 39
- Receiving yards: 308
- Receiving touchdowns: 2
- Stats at Pro Football Reference

Edward Lewis Perry Jr. (born September 1, 1974) is an American former professional football player who played in the National Football League (NFL).

== Biography ==
He graduated from Highland Springs High School in Highland Springs, Virginia, where he earned four varsity letters in football and three in basketball. He continue to play football at James Madison University in Harrisonburg, Virginia. He was selected by the Miami Dolphins in the sixth round of the 1997 NFL draft with the 177th overall pick. He played with the Dolphins through the 2004 season. He played for the Kansas City Chiefs in 2005. In his early seasons he played tight end and served as the teams long snapper, but during his later years he played only long snapper and was regarded as one of the more reliable long snappers in the NFL. He was the last active player to have caught a touchdown pass from Hall of famer Dan Marino.
