= Brent Smith (American football) =

American football player (born 1973)

No. 74
- Positions: Guard, Offensive tackle

Personal information
- Born: November 21, 1973 (age 52); Dallas, Texas, U.S.
- Listed height: 6 ft 5 in (1.96 m)
- Listed weight: 305 lb (138 kg)

Career information
- High school: Pontotoc (Pontotoc, Mississippi)
- College: Mississippi State
- NFL draft: 1997: 3rd round, 96th overall pick

Career history
- Miami Dolphins (1997–2002); New York Jets (2003–2004); Jacksonville Jaguars (2005)

Career NFL statistics
- Games played: 57
- Games started: 30
- Fumble recoveries: 1
- Stats at Pro Football Reference

Gary Brent Smith (born November 21, 1973) is an American former professional football player who was a guard and offensive tackle for eight seasons for the Miami Dolphins and New York Jets of the National Football League (NFL). He was selected in the third round of the 1997 NFL draft. His son, Cole Smith, currently plays football at Mississippi State University.
