= Tim Ruddy =

American football player (born 1972)

No. 61
- Position: Center

Personal information
- Born: April 27, 1972 (age 54); Scranton, Pennsylvania, U.S.
- Listed height: 6 ft 3 in (1.91 m)
- Listed weight: 295 lb (134 kg)

Career information
- High school: Dunmore (Dunmore, Pennsylvania)
- College: Notre Dame
- NFL draft: 1994: 2nd round, 65th overall pick

Career history
- Miami Dolphins (1994–2003)

Awards and highlights
- Pro Bowl (2000); Second-team All-American (1993)

Career NFL statistics
- Games played: 156
- Games started: 140
- Stats at Pro Football Reference

Tim Ruddy (born April 27, 1972) is an American former professional football player who was a center for the Miami Dolphins of the National Football League (NFL) from 1994 to 2003. He played college football for the Notre Dame Fighting Irish.

== High school ==
- Attended Dunmore High School in Dunmore, PA, playing football under legendary coach Jack Henzes
- Named honorable mention All-America by Sporting News as a Senior
- Selected as 15th best prospect in the nation by Atlanta Journal-Constitution
- Won the state championship in the shot put as a senior, took third in the state in the discus that year
- Earned two letters as two-way tackle, long snapper and kicker
- Lettered three times in track, performing in the discus and shot put
- Graduated from Dunmore High School with perfect 4.0 GPA
- Nicknamed 'Big Master'

== College career ==
Ruddy attended The University of Notre Dame from 1990 to 1994. He was a four-year letterman and two year starter during this time. As a senior, he elected as one of the team's captains and was selected as a second-team All-America and first-team All-Independent by The Football News and the Associated Press.

Ruddy also posted a perfect 4.0 GPA his junior and senior years at Notre Dame. He graduated summa cum laude with a 3.86 GPA and holds a B.S. in mechanical engineering, and holds membership in the Tau Beta Pi engineering honor society. He also earned post-graduate scholarships from the NCAA and the National Football Foundation. He was named as an Academic All-American during both his junior and senior years, and was named the GTE Academic All American of the Year in his senior season.

== Professional career ==
Ruddy was the second-round draft choice (65th overall) of Miami in 1994. Ruddy started 140 games of his 156 games played, in which all 16 of those non-starts were his rookie year, but he saw time in all of them. He missed only 4 regular season games during his 10-year career. During most of his career, he was the center for Dan Marino, who has held almost every meaningful NFL passing record and is widely recognized as one of the greatest quarterbacks in football history. He also anchored the line in 2002 for Ricky Williams's NFL rushing title, which included two 200+ yard rushing games. During Ruddy's 10 years with the Dolphins(1994–2003), the team made the playoffs 7 times, and never posted a losing record for the season.

In 2001, Ruddy was named to his first and only Pro Bowl. Ruddy was the first Miami center to be selected to the Pro Bowl since Hall of Fame center Dwight Stephenson in 1987. The last year of Ruddy's career was plagued by injury and his playing time was limited. Ruddy was released by Miami following the 2003 season. It was rumored he talked to a few teams after his departure from Miami, but did not sign with any team.

Ruddy was elected team captain 3 times and was selected as one of the top 40 Miami Dolphin players of all time. He was named as a second team offensive line selection to the Pennsylvania Football News All-Century Team. In 2020, he was elected into the Pennsylvania Sports Hall of Fame.
