= 1999–2000 NFL playoffs =

American football tournament

- Dates: January 8–30, 2000
- Season: 1999
- Teams: 12
- Games played: 11
- Super Bowl XXXIV site: Georgia Dome; Atlanta, Georgia
- Defending champions: Denver Broncos (did not qualify)
- Champion: St. Louis Rams (1st title)
- Runner-up: Tennessee Titans
- Conference runners-up: Jacksonville Jaguars; Tampa Bay Buccaneers
NFL playoffs
← 1998–99	2000–01 →

The National Football League playoffs for the 1999 season began on January 8, 2000 and included the Music City Miracle, the postseason tournament concluded with the St. Louis Rams defeating the Tennessee Titans in Super Bowl XXXIV, 23–16, on January 30, at the Georgia Dome in Atlanta.

These playoffs were notable in that all outdoor games were played with gametime temperatures of 50 °F (10 °C) or higher, making for one of the warmest playoff seasons of all time. It was also the first time since 1969 that no California-based NFL team made the playoffs.

For only the second time during the Super Bowl era, all three Florida-based teams (the Jacksonville Jaguars, Miami Dolphins, and Tampa Bay Buccaneers) made the playoffs—something that did not occur again until the 2022–23 postseason, with the Jaguars and Dolphins facing off in the divisional round. As the Jaguars and Buccaneers advanced to their respective conference championships, the postseason became the closest to having a Super Bowl between teams from Florida.

== Participants ==
Within each conference, the three division winners and the three non-division winners with the best overall regular season records qualified for the playoffs. The three division winners were seeded 1–3 based on the overall won-lost-tied record, and the three wild card teams were seeded 4–6. The NFL did not use a fixed bracket playoff system, and there were no restrictions regarding teams from the same division matching up in any round. In the first round, dubbed the wild-card playoffs or wild-card weekend, the third-seeded division winner hosted the sixth seed wild card, and the fourth seed hosted the fifth. The 1 and 2 seeds from each conference received a first-round bye. In the second round, the divisional playoffs, the number 1 seed hosted the worst-remaining seed from the first round (seed 4, 5, or 6), while the number 2 seed played the other team (seed 3, 4, or 5). The two winning teams from each conference's divisional playoff games then meet in the respective AFC and NFC Conference Championship games, hosted by the higher seed. Although the Super Bowl, the championship round of the playoffs, was played at a neutral site, the designated home team was based on an annual rotation by conference.

Playoff seeds
Seed	AFC	NFC
1	Jacksonville Jaguars (Central winner)	St. Louis Rams (West winner)
2	Indianapolis Colts (East winner)	Tampa Bay Buccaneers (Central winner)
3	Seattle Seahawks (West winner)	Washington Redskins (East winner)
4	Tennessee Titans (wild card)	Minnesota Vikings (wild card)
5	Buffalo Bills (wild card)	Dallas Cowboys (wild card)
6	Miami Dolphins (wild card)	Detroit Lions (wild card)

== Bracket ==
Jan 8 – FedExField	Jan 15 – Raymond James Stadium
6	Detroit	13
3	Washington	13
3	Washington	27	Jan 23 – Trans World Dome
2	Tampa Bay	14
NFC
Jan 9 – Hubert H. Humphrey Metrodome	2	Tampa Bay	6
Jan 16 – Trans World Dome
1	St. Louis	11
5	Dallas	10	NFC Championship
4	Minnesota	37
4	Minnesota	27	Jan 30 – Georgia Dome
1	St. Louis	49
Wild Card playoffs
Divisional playoffs
Jan 8 – Adelphia Coliseum	N1	St. Louis	23
Jan 16 – RCA Dome
A4	Tennessee	16
5	Buffalo	16	Super Bowl XXXIV
4	Tennessee	19
4	Tennessee	22	Jan 23 – Alltel Stadium
2	Indianapolis	16
AFC
Jan 9 – Kingdome	4	Tennessee	33
Jan 15 – Alltel Stadium
1	Jacksonville	14
6	Miami	20	AFC Championship
6	Miami	7
3	Seattle	17
1	Jacksonville	62

== Schedule ==
In the United States, ABC broadcast the first two Wild Card games on January 8, and Super Bowl XXXIV. CBS telecast the rest of the AFC playoff games and Fox the rest of the NFC games.

Round	Away team	Score	Home team	Date	Kickoff (ET / UTC−5)	TV
Wild-card round	Buffalo Bills	16–22	Tennessee Titans	January 8, 2000	12:30 p.m.	ABC
Wild-card round	Detroit Lions	13–27	Washington Redskins	January 8, 2000	4:00 p.m.	ABC
Wild-card round	Dallas Cowboys	10–27	Minnesota Vikings	January 9, 2000	12:30 p.m.	Fox
Wild-card round	Miami Dolphins	20–17	Seattle Seahawks	January 9, 2000	4:00 p.m.	CBS
Divisional round	Miami Dolphins	7–62	Jacksonville Jaguars	January 15, 2000	12:30 p.m.	CBS
Divisional round	Washington Redskins	13–14	Tampa Bay Buccaneers	January 15, 2000	4:00 p.m.	Fox
Divisional round	Minnesota Vikings	37–49	St. Louis Rams	January 16, 2000	12:30 p.m.	Fox
Divisional round	Tennessee Titans	19–16	Indianapolis Colts	January 16, 2000	4:00 p.m.	CBS
Conference championships	Tennessee Titans	33–14	Jacksonville Jaguars	January 23, 2000	12:30 p.m.	CBS
Conference championships	Tampa Bay Buccaneers	6–11	St. Louis Rams	January 23, 2000	4:00 p.m.	Fox
Super Bowl XXXIV Georgia Dome Atlanta, Georgia	St. Louis Rams	23–16	Tennessee Titans	January 30, 2000	6:25 p.m.	ABC

== Wild-card round ==
=== Saturday, January 8, 2000 ===
==== AFC: Tennessee Titans 22, Buffalo Bills 16 ====
Buffalo Bills vs. Tennessee Titans – Game summary

Quarter	1	2	3	4	Total
Bills	0	0	7	9	16
Titans	0	12	0	10	22

at Adelphia Coliseum, Nashville, Tennessee

- Game time: 12:30 p.m. EST/11:30 a.m. CST
- Game weather: 40 °F (4 °C), cloudy
- Game attendance: 66,672
- Referee: Phil Luckett
- TV announcers (ABC): Mike Patrick (play-by-play), Joe Theismann, Paul Maguire (color commentators), and Solomon Wilcots (sideline reporter)

Game information

First quarter

- No scoring plays.

Second quarter

- TEN – Safety, Jevon Kearse sacked Rob Johnson in end zone, 11:19. Titans 2–0.
- TEN – Steve McNair 1-yard run (Al Del Greco kick), 7:55. Titans 9–0. Drive: 5 plays, 28 yards, 3:24.
- TEN – Al Del Greco 40-yard field goal, 0:00. Titans 12–0. Drive: 11 plays, 56 yards, 1:46.

Third quarter

- BUF – Antowain Smith 4-yard run (Steve Christie kick), 12:28. Titans 12–7. Drive: 5 plays, 62 yards, 2:32.

Fourth quarter

- BUF – Antowain Smith 1-yard run (pass failed), 11:08. Bills 13–12. Drive: 9 plays, 65 yards, 4:33.
- TEN – Al Del Greco 36-yard field goal, 1:48. Titans 15–13. Drive: 10 plays, 27 yards, 4:27.
- BUF – Steve Christie 41-yard field goal, 0:16. Bills 16–15. Drive: 6 plays, 38 yards, 1:32.
- TEN – Kevin Dyson 75-yard kickoff return lateral from Frank Wycheck (Al Del Greco kick), 0:03. Titans 22–16.

Top passers

- BUF – Rob Johnson – 10/22, 131 yards
- TEN – Steve McNair – 13/24, 76 yards, INT

Top rushers

- BUF – Antowain Smith – 14 rushes, 79 yards, 2 TD
- TEN – Eddie George – 29 rushes, 106 yards

Top receivers

- BUF – Eric Moulds – 3 receptions, 62 yards
  Peerless Price – 5 receptions, 62 yards
- TEN – Frank Wycheck – 6 receptions, 34 yards

This game is remembered for the controversial "Music City Miracle": Kevin Dyson took a lateral from Frank Wycheck on a kickoff to score the game-winning touchdown with under 15 seconds left.

In the first quarter, the Titans had a big chance to score when Jevon Kearse forced a fumble while sacking Buffalo quarterback Rob Johnson that linebacker Barron Wortham recovered on the Buffalo 29-yard line. It was the start of a long day for Johnson, who ended up completing just 10 of 22 passes while being sacked six times, twice by Kearse. However, Tennessee only gained 3 yards with their next drive and Al Del Greco missed a 43-yard field goal attempt.

Early in the second quarter, Craig Hentrich's 44-yard punt pinned the Bills back at their own 4-yard line. Then on 2nd and 6 from the 8, Kearse sacked Johnson, forcing a fumble that went through the end zone for a safety that gave the Titans a 2–0 lead. After the safety, Derrick Mason returned the free kick 42 yards to the Bills 28-yard line. Five plays later, Tennessee quarterback Steve McNair scored on a 1-yard touchdown run. After several punts, Buffalo got a first down on their own 43 when Kurt Schulz forced and recovered a fumble from Titans running back Eddie George. But the Bills could not gain a first down and had to punt. Then the Titans drove 56 yards in 11 plays. Del Greco initially missed a 45-yard field goal attempt, but the Bills were penalized for defensive holding on the play, and Del Greco's second attempt was good from 40 yards on the last play of the half. At the end of the half, the Bills were trailing 12–0 and had only managed to gain 64 yards, while also losing 44 yards on nine penalties.

But in the second half, the Bills managed to rally back. On Buffalo's first play of the third quarter, Antowain Smith broke off a 44-yard run, sparking a 62-yard drive that ended with his 4-yard touchdown carry, making the score 12–7. Later on, Tennessee drove to the Bills 39-yard line, only to lose the ball due to an interception by Antoine Winfield. With 41 seconds left in the third quarter, a Titans punt gave Buffalo the ball on their own 35-yard line, where they proceeded to drive 65 yards, featuring a 37-yard completion from Johnson to Eric Moulds, with a roughing the passer penalty on Kearse adding another 15. Smith finished the drive with another 4-yard touchdown run, giving the Bills a 13–12 lead after receiver Kevin Williams dropped a pass from Johnson on the two-point conversion attempt.

Late in the fourth quarter, Titans receiver Isaac Byrd's 16-yard punt return to the Bills 45 and five carries from George for 17 yards set up a 36-yard field goal by Del Greco, giving Tennessee a 15–13 lead with 1:38 left. But following a 33-yard kickoff return by Williams, the Bills retook the lead with a 41-yard field goal from Steve Christie at the end of a 38-yard drive that saw Johnson lose a shoe. Stuck in the no-huddle offense in order to beat the clock, Johnson was forced to play without a shoe for most of the drive, but still managed to lead the team into scoring range with two key completions to Peerless Price for 23 yards. Christie's field goal gave the Bills a 16–15 lead with only 16 seconds left in the game.

On the ensuing Christie kickoff, fullback Lorenzo Neal picked up the ball at his own 25-yard line. He then handed off to Wycheck, who ran all the way to the right sideline before lateralling the ball all the way back to Dyson on the left side of the field. After taking the ball, Dyson ran 75 yards for a touchdown to give his team the win. The play was reviewed by referee Phil Luckett, but it was determined that Wycheck's lateral did not travel forward, and the play was upheld.

"We worked on that play yesterday", said Titans coach Jeff Fisher of the winning return. "The play is called Home Run Throwback, it's a play you usually work on Saturdays, the day before a game. That play was designed with Frank Wycheck in the middle to try and put the ball out laterally." However, this was the first time they ran the play with Dyson, who replaced Mason as kick returner when he was injured earlier in the game.

George finished the game with 106 rushing yards. Bills defensive end Bruce Smith had 2.5 sacks. Both teams combined for just 413 total yards (219 for Buffalo, 194 for Tennessee). The game marked the end of an era in Buffalo as it was the final game that Smith, Thurman Thomas and Andre Reed played for the Bills. With the win, the Titans won their first playoff game since 1991, when they were the Oilers.

The Bills did not make the playoffs again after this game for another 18 years.

This was the third postseason meeting between the Bills and Titans. Buffalo won the prior two meetings when the Titans were the Houston Oilers.

Previous playoff games
Buffalo leads 2–0 in all-time playoff games

1988

Houston Oilers 10 @ Buffalo Bills 17

1988 AFC Divisional playoffs

1992

Houston Oilers 38 @ Buffalo Bills 41 (OT)

1992 AFC Wild Card playoffs

==== NFC: Washington Redskins 27, Detroit Lions 13 ====
Detroit Lions vs. Washington Redskins – Game summary

Quarter	1	2	3	4	Total
Lions	0	0	0	13	13
Redskins	14	13	0	0	27

at FedExField, Landover, Maryland

- Game time: 4:00 p.m. EST
- Game weather: 50 °F (10 °C), partly cloudy
- Game attendance: 79,411
- Referee: Bob McElwee
- TV announcers (ABC): Al Michaels (play-by-play), Boomer Esiason (color commentator), and Lesley Visser (sideline reporter)
- Game Book

Game information

First quarter

- WAS – Stephen Davis 1-yard run (Brett Conway kick), 9:09. Redskins 7–0. Drive: 9 plays, 69 yards, 3:38.
- WAS – Stephen Davis 4-yard run (Brett Conway kick), 2:28. Redskins 14–0. Drive: 8 plays, 87 yards, 3:36.

Second quarter

- WAS – Brett Conway 33-yard field goal, 13:50. Redskins 17–0. Drive: 4 plays, 24 yards, 1:55.
- WAS – Brett Conway 23-yard field goal, 9:50. Redskins 20–0. Drive: 6 plays, 45 yards, 2:53.
- WAS – Albert Connell 30-yard pass from Brad Johnson (Brett Conway kick), 1:19. Redskins 27–0. Drive: 8 plays, 82 yards, 3:36.

Third quarter

- No scoring plays.

Fourth quarter

- DET – Ron Rice 94-yard return of blocked field goal (pass failed), 9:23. Redskins 27–6.
- DET – Ron Rivers 5-yard pass from Gus Frerotte (Jason Hanson kick), 0:00. Redskins 27–13. Drive: 12 plays, 90 yards, 2:35.

Top passers

- DET – Gus Frerotte – 21/46, 251 yards, TD, 2 INT
- WAS – Brad Johnson – 15/31, 174 yards, TD, 2 INT

Top rushers

- DET – Cory Schlesinger – 7 rushes, 23 yards
- WAS – Stephen Davis – 15 rushes, 119 yards, 2 TD

Top receivers

- DET – Herman Moore – 3 receptions, 69 yards
- WAS – Larry Centers – 7 receptions, 61 yards

Redskins running back Stephen Davis rushed for 119 yards and two touchdowns in the first half as Washington dominated the Lions, who had barely made the playoffs with an 8–8 record and had lost their last four games of the season. Washington outgained Detroit in rushing yards, 223–45, and recorded five sacks.

Washington took advantage of two key penalties against the Lions on their first drive as they drove 79 yards to score on Davis' 1-yard touchdown run. The first was a running into the punter penalty against linebacker Clint Kriewaldt that enabled them to keep the ball, and the second was a 41-yard pass interference penalty on Lions cornerback Bryant Westbrook. The next time Washington got the ball, they drove 87 yards, featuring a 58-yard run by Davis, and scored with another Davis touchdown run to take a 14–0 lead.

Late in the first quarter, Redskins cornerback Champ Bailey intercepted a pass from Gus Frerotte and returned it five yards to the Lions 39, setting up a 33-yard field goal from Brett Conway. After a punt, running back Brian Mitchell gave the team excellent field position with an 11-yard return to the Lions 49-yard line. Davis then rushed five times for 45 yards, setting up another field goal from Conway that gave the team a 20–0 lead. Davis was knocked out of the game on Washington's next possession, but his replacement, Skip Hicks, rushed for 13 yards and caught two passes for 27 as the Redskins drove 82 yards in eight plays. Brad Johnson finished the drive with a 30-yard touchdown pass to Albert Connell, giving the Redskins a 27–0 lead with 1:19 left in the half.

After a scoreless third quarter, the Lions finally managed to get a touchdown when cornerback Lamar Campbell blocked a 31-yard field goal attempt by Conway and Ron Rice returned the ball 94 yards for a touchdown with 9:23 left in regulation. But after that, they were unable to score again until Frerotte finished a 90-yard drive with a 5-yard touchdown pass to Ron Rivers on the last play of the game.

The Lions, after this game, did not make the playoffs again until the 2011 season. Further, Washington did not host another playoff game until 2012.

This was the third postseason meeting between the Lions and Redskins. Washington had won both prior meetings.

Previous playoff games
Washington leads 2–0 in all-time playoff games

1982

Detroit Lions 7 @ Washington Redskins 31

1982 NFC First Round playoffs

1991

Detroit Lions 10 @ Washington Redskins 41

1991 NFC Championship Game

=== Sunday, January 9, 2000 ===
==== NFC: Minnesota Vikings 27, Dallas Cowboys 10 ====
Dallas Cowboys vs. Minnesota Vikings – Game summary

Quarter	1	2	3	4	Total
Cowboys	10	0	0	0	10
Vikings	3	14	3	7	27

at Hubert H. Humphrey Metrodome, Minneapolis

- Game time: 12:30 p.m. EST
- Game weather: Played indoors, domed stadium
- Game attendance: 64,056
- Referee: Gerald Austin
- TV announcers (Fox): Pat Summerall (play-by-play), John Madden (color commentator), D. J. Johnson, and Ron Pitts (sideline reporters)
- Recap, Game Book

Game information

First quarter

- DAL – Eddie Murray 18-yard field goal, 11:09. Cowboys 3–0. Drive: 7 plays, 78 yards, 3:51.
- MIN – Gary Anderson 47-yard field goal, 7:59. Tied 3–3. Drive: 4 plays, 1 yard, 1:59.
- DAL – Emmitt Smith 5-yard run (Eddie Murray kick), 5:00. Cowboys 10–3. Drive: 7 plays, 79 yards, 2:59.

Second quarter

- MIN – Robert Smith 26-yard pass from Jeff George (Gary Anderson kick), 9:21. Tied 10–10. Drive: 4 plays, 23 yards, 2:23.
- MIN – Randy Moss 58-yard pass from Jeff George (Gary Anderson kick), 0:28. Vikings 17–10. Drive: 6 plays, 82 yards, 1:58.

Third quarter

- MIN – Gary Anderson 38-yard field goal, 3:10. Vikings 20–10. Drive: 10 plays, 60 yards, 5:01.

Fourth quarter

- MIN – Cris Carter 5-yard pass from Jeff George (Gary Anderson kick), 12:40. Vikings 27–10. Drive: 7 plays, 67 yards, 3:49.

Top passers

- DAL – Troy Aikman – 22/38, 286 yards, INT
- MIN – Jeff George – 12/25, 212 yards, 3 TD

Top rushers

- DAL – Emmitt Smith – 15 rushes, 99 yards, TD
- MIN – Robert Smith – 28 rushes, 140 yards

Top receivers

- DAL – Raghib Ismail – 8 receptions, 163 yards
- MIN – Randy Moss – 5 receptions, 127 yards, TD

Running back Robert Smith helped the Vikings beat the Cowboys by rushing for a team playoff record 140 yards while also catching three passes for 58 yards and a touchdown. The Vikings also got a big performance out of quarterback Jeff George, who threw for 212 yards and three touchdowns, and receiver Randy Moss, who caught five passes for 127 yards and a touchdown. Dallas quarterback Troy Aikman threw for 286 yards and an interception in the final postseason game of his Hall of Fame career. This was also the final postseason game in the Hall of Fame career of running back Emmitt Smith, who rushed for 99 yards, caught a pass for 14 yards, and scored a touchdown. His 99 rushing yards gave him an NFL record postseason total 1,586 yards, surpassing the previous record of 1,556 yards held by Franco Harris. Cowboys receiver Raghib Ismail caught eight passes for 163 yards.

Early in the first quarter, Smith's 65-yard run set up an Eddie Murray field goal. It was the main highlight of the day for Smith, who gained only 30 yards on 14 carries for the rest of the game. Minnesota was forced to punt on their next drive, but returner Deion Sanders muffed the kick and Dwayne Rudd recovered the ball for the Vikings at the Cowboys 30-yard line. Four plays later, Gary Anderson kicked a 47-yard field goal to tie the game. Aikman led the Cowboys back, completing two passes to Ismail for gains of 45 and 25 yards before Smith finished the drive with a 10-yard touchdown run.

In the second quarter, Rudd stripped the ball from Cowboys running back Robert Thomas and safety Anthony Bass recovered the fumble at the Dallas 26-yard line. Faced with third down and 25 on the ensuing possession, George completed a short pass to Smith, who took it 26 yards for a touchdown to tie the game. Later in the quarter, George threw a 58-yard touchdown pass to Moss after a daring 14-yard run by Smith on third down and 12, giving the Vikings a 17–10 lead with 22 seconds left in the half.

Early in the third quarter, Anderson kicked a 38-yard field goal to increase the Vikings lead to 20–10. In the fourth quarter, they drove 67 yards and scored with George's 5-yard touchdown pass to Cris Carter, while the Cowboys lost any chance of a comeback due to two more costly turnovers. First they drove inside the Vikings 20-yard line, but linebacker Ed McDaniel forced a fumble from receiver Jason Tucker right before he could cross the goal line and the ball rolled through the end zone for a touchback. Later on, Dallas drove all the way to the Minnesota 6-yard line, but safety Robert Griffith intercepted a pass intended for Tucker in the end zone.

This was the sixth postseason meeting between the Cowboys and Vikings. Dallas had won four of the previous five meetings.

Previous playoff games
Dallas leads 4–1 in all-time playoff games

1971

Dallas Cowboys 20 @ Minnesota Vikings 12

1971 NFC Divisional playoffs

1973

Minnesota Vikings 27 @ Dallas Cowboys 10

1973 NFC Championship Game

1975

Dallas Cowboys 17 @ Minnesota Vikings 14

1975 NFC Divisional playoffs

1977

Minnesota Vikings 6 @ Dallas Cowboys 23

1977 NFC Championship Game

1996

Minnesota Vikings 15 @ Dallas Cowboys 40

1996 NFC Wild Card playoffs

==== AFC: Miami Dolphins 20, Seattle Seahawks 17 ====
Miami Dolphins vs. Seattle Seahawks – Game summary

Quarter	1	2	3	4	Total
Dolphins	3	0	10	7	20
Seahawks	7	3	7	0	17

at Kingdome, Seattle

- Game time: 4:00 p.m. EST/1:00 p.m. PST
- Game weather: Played indoors, domed stadium
- Game attendance: 66,170
- Referee: Tony Corrente
- TV announcers (CBS): Greg Gumbel (play-by-play), Phil Simms (color commentator), and Armen Keteyian (sideline reporter)
- Recap

Game information

First quarter

- SEA – Sean Dawkins 9-yard pass from Jon Kitna (Todd Peterson kick), 6:18. Seahawks 7–0. Drive: 8 plays, 47 yards, 3:35.
- MIA – Olindo Mare 32-yard field goal, 2:05. Seahawks 7–3. Drive: 7 plays, 37 yards, 4:13.

Second quarter

- SEA – Todd Peterson 50-yard field goal, 0:45. Seahawks 10–3. Drive: 8 plays, 49 yards, 3:45.

Third quarter

- MIA – Oronde Gadsden 1-yard pass from Dan Marino (Olindo Mare kick), 8:55. Tied 10–10. Drive: 10 plays, 60 yards, 6:05.
- SEA – Charlie Rogers 85-yard kick return (Todd Peterson kick), 8:37. Seahawks 17–10.
- MIA – Olindo Mare 50-yard field goal, 2:22. Seahawks 17–13. Drive: 6 plays, 32 yards, 3:12.

Fourth quarter

- MIA – J. J. Johnson 2-yard run (Olindo Mare kick), 4:48. Dolphins 20–17. Drive: 11 plays, 85 yards, 4:21.

Top passers

- MIA – Dan Marino – 17/30, 196 yards, TD
- SEA – Jon Kitna – 14/30, 162 yards, TD, 2 INT

Top rushers

- MIA – J. J. Johnson – 27 rushes, 86 yards, TD
- SEA – Ricky Watters – 19 rushes, 40 yards

Top receivers

- MIA – O. J. McDuffie – 5 receptions, 82 yards
- SEA – Sean Dawkins – 3 receptions, 35 yards, TD

The Seattle Seahawks played host to their first playoff game since the 1984 season. But they were dominated by the Dolphins defense, who held them to only 171 yards, with just 32 in the second half, and sacked quarterback Jon Kitna six times, three by Trace Armstrong. Although they jumped out to a 17–10 lead in the third quarter, the Dolphins rallied back behind quarterback Dan Marino, who threw for 196 yards and a touchdown, leading his team to their first playoff win on the road since 1972 in what ultimately proved to be the final game played at the Kingdome and the final win of Marino's career.

At the end of the game's opening drive, Seattle punter Jeff Feagles' 35-yard punt pinned the Dolphins back at their own 4-yard line. Three plays later, Seahawks running back Charlie Rogers returned Tom Hutton's 58-yard punt 15 yards to the Miami 47. Kitna then completed a pair of passes to Mike Pritchard for gains of 12 and 17 yards as the team drove to a touchdown on his 9-yard completion to Sean Dawkins. Miami's only score of the first half was a 32-yard field goal from Olindo Mare set up by Brock Marion's 47-yard kickoff return.

In the second quarter, Miami got the ball with good field position when Marion intercepted a pass from Kitna on the Dolphins 41, but this merely resulted in three incompletions and a punt. After a few more drives, a 15-yard facemask penalty against Dolphins cornerback Sam Madison turned Ricky Watters' 14-yard run into a 29-yard gain, setting up Todd Peterson's 50-yard field goal with less than a minute left in the half. The Seahawks finished the half leading 10–3, and had limited Miami to just 69 offensive yards.

But Miami took the second half kickoff and nearly doubled their yardage, driving 60 yards in 10 plays, including receptions by O. J. McDuffie for gains of 11 and 27 yards. Marino, who completed only five of eight passes for 28 yards in the first half, completed all six of his passes for 55 yards on the drive and finished it with a 1-yard touchdown pass to Oronde Gadsden. On the ensuing kickoff, Rogers fumbled the ball, then picked it up and returned it 85 yards for a touchdown, giving Seattle a 17–10 lead. After a few punts, Miami drove 32 yards in six plays, aided by two runs by Autry Denson for 28 yards, to set up a 50-yard field goal from Mare, cutting the score to 17–13. After the field goal, the Dolphins recovered an onside kick, but could only advance to their 49-yard line before being forced to punt.

With 9:09 remaining in the fourth quarter, Feagles' 50-yard punt gave the Dolphins the ball on their own 15-yard line. Marino then engineered an 11-play, 85-yard game-winning scoring possession. He completed four of seven passes for 84 yards on the drive, including a 23-yard completion to Tony Martin on third down and 17 from his own 8-yard line, a 20-yard pass to Martin from the Seahawks 49 to the Seahawks 29, and a 24-yard completion to Gadsden at the Seattle 5-yard line on third and 10. Rookie running back J. J. Johnson's 2-yard touchdown run finished the drive with 4:46 left in the game, and the Seahawks could not score again. After being forced to punt, Seattle didn't get the ball back until 1:05 remained, when Hutton's 38-yard punt pinned them on their own 12-yard line. They were only able to reach their 29 before time ran out. This is the last playoff game that the Seahawks played as an AFC member, as they moved to the NFC starting in the 2002 season.

Rogers finished the game with 4 kickoff returns for 159 yards and a touchdown, along with 3 punt returns for 24 yards.

This was the third postseason meeting between the Dolphins and Seahawks. Both teams split the prior two meetings.

Previous playoff games
Tied 1–1 in all-time playoff games

1983

Seattle Seahawks 27 @ Miami Dolphins 20

1983 AFC Divisional playoffs

1984

Seattle Seahawks 10 @ Miami Dolphins 31

1984 AFC Divisional playoffs

== Divisional round ==
=== Saturday, January 15, 2000 ===
==== AFC: Jacksonville Jaguars 62, Miami Dolphins 7 ====
Miami Dolphins vs. Jacksonville Jaguars – Game summary

Quarter	1	2	3	4	Total
Dolphins	0	7	0	0	7
Jaguars	24	17	14	7	62

at Alltel Stadium, Jacksonville, Florida

- Game time: 12:30 p.m. EST
- Game weather: 61 °F (16 °C), clear
- Game attendance: 75,173
- Referee: Ed Hochuli
- TV announcers (CBS): Verne Lundquist (play-by-play), Dan Dierdorf (color commentator), and Bonnie Bernstein (sideline reporter)
- Recap, Game Book

Game information

First quarter

- JAX – Jimmy Smith 8-yard pass from Mark Brunell (Mike Hollis kick), 10:32. Jaguars 7–0. Drive: 9 plays, 73 yards, 4:28.
- JAX – Mike Hollis 45-yard field goal, 6:19. Jaguars 10–0. Drive: 9 plays, 14 yards, 3:53.
- JAX – Fred Taylor 90-yard run (Mike Hollis kick), 3:46. Jaguars 17–0. Drive: 2 plays, 91 yards, 0:51.
- JAX – Tony Brackens 16-yard fumble return (Mike Hollis kick), 3:21. Jaguars 24–0.

Second quarter

- JAX – Fred Taylor 39-yard pass from Mark Brunell (Mike Hollis kick) (Mike Hollis kick), 14:48. Jaguars 31–0. Drive: 4 plays, 53 yards, 1:47.
- JAX – James Stewart 25-yard run (Mike Hollis kick), 12:05. Jaguars 38–0. Drive: 3 plays, 21 yards, 1:12.
- JAX – Mike Hollis 28-yard field goal, 1:51. Jaguars 41–0. Drive: 5 plays, 20 yards, 1:26.
- MIA – Oronde Gadsden 20-yard pass from Dan Marino (Olindo Mare kick), 0:01. Jaguars 41–7. Drive: 9 plays, 80 yards, 1:50.

Third quarter

- JAX – Jimmy Smith 70-yard pass from Jay Fiedler (Mike Hollis kick), 12:03. Jaguars 48–7. Drive: 3 plays, 78 yards, 1:19.
- JAX – Alvis Whitted 38-yard pass from Jay Fiedler (Mike Hollis kick), 6:19. Jaguars 55–7. Drive: 5 plays, 69 yards, 2:11.

Fourth quarter

- JAX – Chris Howard 5-yard run (Mike Hollis kick), 10:37. Jaguars 62–7. Drive: 1 play, 5 yards, 0:06.

Top passers

- MIA – Dan Marino – 11/25, 95 yards, TD, 2 INT
- JAX – Jay Fiedler – 7/11, 172 yards, 2 TD, INT

Top rushers

- MIA – Stanley Pritchett – 2 rushes, 10 yards
- JAX – Fred Taylor – 18 rushes, 135 yards, TD

Top receivers

- MIA – Oronde Gadsden – 6 receptions, 62 yards, TD
- JAX – Jimmy Smith – 5 receptions, 136 yards, 2 TD

The Jaguars shredded the Dolphins with 520 total offensive yards in what became Miami quarterback Dan Marino's last game in the NFL and the most lopsided postseason contest since the Chicago Bears defeated the Redskins 73–0 in the 1940 NFL Championship Game. Their defense forced seven turnovers and held the Dolphins to 131 total yards.

Jacksonville running back Fred Taylor rushed for 135 yards and a touchdown on 18 carries in the first half, while also catching a 39-yard touchdown reception. In the second half, his replacement, James Stewart, added 62 yards on 11 carries. Quarterback Mark Brunell, playing with braces on both knees, completed five of nine passes for 102 yards and two touchdowns before being replaced by Jay Fiedler in the second quarter after the Jaguars scored 38 points in the first 18 minutes. Fiedler completed seven of 11 passes for 172 yards, two touchdowns, and an interception. Receiver Jimmy Smith had the best postseason performance of his career, catching five passes for 136 yards and two touchdowns. Marino completed just 11 of 25 passes for 95 yards and a touchdown, with two interceptions and a fumble that was returned for a touchdown.

On the opening drive of the game, Brunell led the Jaguars 73 yards in nine plays, featuring a 41-yard completion to Smith, and finished the drive with an 8-yard touchdown pass to Smith 4:28 into the game. After the ensuing kickoff, Jacksonville cornerback Aaron Beasley intercepted Marino's first pass of the game and returned it five yards to the Dolphins 41-yard line, setting a 45-yard field goal from Mike Hollis. Following a three-and-out for Miami, Tom Hutton's 57-yard punt pinned the Jaguars back at their own 9-yard line. But two plays later, Taylor took off down the right sideline for an NFL playoff record 90-yard touchdown run. Then on Miami's next possession, defensive end Tony Brackens forced a fumble from Marino and dove on the ball. With most players on both teams thinking he was down by contact, Brackens got up and started celebrating while the Dolphins offense walked off the field, but his teammate Bryce Paup realized that no one had touched Brackens and the play was still ongoing. He ran up to Brackens, shoved him in the back, and told him to start running, and Brackens ended up returning the ball 16 yards for a touchdown.

The situation never got much better for the Dolphins. After another three and out, Jacksonville got the ball back at their own 47-yard line, and they scored another touchdown when Taylor caught a short pass on third down and 14 and took it 39 yards for a touchdown, giving the Jaguars a 31–0 lead just 12 seconds into the second quarter. Then on Miami's next possession, Jaguars rookie Corey Chamblin blocked Hutton's punt and Chris Howard recovered the ball on the Dolphins 21-yard line. Faced with third down and 14 again on their ensuing drive, the Jaguars decided not to pass and Stewart ended up scoring with a 25-yard touchdown run.

Miami continued to turn the ball over through the second quarter. Beasley recorded his second interception from Marino on the Dolphins next possession. Then after a punt, running back Autry Denson fumbled a pitch from Marino, and safety Donovin Darius recovered the ball at the Dolphins 7-yard line. This time, the Jaguars could not take advantage of the turnover. Two plays later, Calvin Jackson intercepted a pass from Fiedler in the end zone. But several plays after the interception, Jacksonville safety Carnell Lake forced and recovered a fumble from J. J. Johnson on the Dolphins 30-yard line, setting up a 30-yard field goal from Hollis with 1:47 left in the second quarter. Marino, who completed only three of 11 passes for 12 yards up to this point, finally managed to respond, completing seven of 12 passes for 79 yards on an 80-yard scoring drive and finishing it off with a 20-yard touchdown pass to Oronde Gadsden with less than 20 seconds left before halftime.

But even so, it was clear by now the game was over, as the Jaguars held a commanding 41–7 lead. Marino was benched in the second half, and his replacement, Damon Huard, completed just five of 16 passes for 46 yards in the rest of the game. Meanwhile, Jacksonville continued to increase their lead. On the third play of the second half, Fiedler threw a 70-yard touchdown pass to Smith. Later on in the third quarter, he threw a 38-yard touchdown pass to Alvis Whitted. And in the final quarter, another fumble from Johnson set up the final points of the game, a 5-yard touchdown run by Howard.

This was the first postseason meeting between the Dolphins and Jaguars.

==== NFC: Tampa Bay Buccaneers 14, Washington Redskins 13 ====
Washington Redskins vs. Tampa Bay Buccaneers – Game summary

Quarter	1	2	3	4	Total
Redskins	0	3	10	0	13
Buccaneers	0	0	7	7	14

at Raymond James Stadium, Tampa, Florida

- Game time: 4:00 p.m. EST
- Game weather: 68 °F (20 °C), clear
- Game attendance: 65,835
- Referee: Dick Hantak
- TV announcers (Fox): Dick Stockton (play-by-play), Matt Millen (color commentator), and Pam Oliver (sideline reporter)
- Game Book

Game information

First quarter

- No scoring plays.

Second quarter

- WAS – Brett Conway 28-yard field goal, 5:37. Redskins 3–0. Drive: 8 plays, 33 yards, 4:45.

Third quarter

- WAS – Brian Mitchell 100-yard kickoff return, 14:41. Redskins 10–0. Drive: 0 plays, 0 yards, 0:19.
- WAS – Brett Conway 48-yard field goal, 8:10. Redskins 13–0. Drive: 4 plays, 6 yards, 1:41.
- TB – Mike Alstott 2-yard run (Martín Gramática kick), 2:03. Redskins 13–7. Drive: 6 plays, 73 yards, 3:03.

Fourth quarter

- TB – John Davis 1-yard pass from Shaun King (Martín Gramática kick), 7:29. Buccaneers 14–13. Drive: 10 plays, 32 yards, 5:52.

Top passers

- WAS – Brad Johnson – 20/32, 149 yards, INT
- TB – Shaun King – 15/32, 157 yards, TD, INT

Top rushers

- WAS – Stephen Davis – 17 rushes, 37 yards
- TB – Mike Alstott – 15 rushes, 24 yards, TD

Top receivers

- WAS – Albert Connell – 4 receptions, 59 yards
- TB – Bert Emanuel – 2 receptions, 47 yards

The Buccaneers forced two key turnovers in the second half to rally from a 13–0 deficit, while their defense held Washington to just 157 yards, with only 32 in the second half. The win sent Tampa to its first NFC Championship Game in 20 years.

After a scoreless first quarter, a 35-yard punt from Mark Royals gave the Redskins great field position on the Tampa Bay 43-yard line. Brad Johnson started out the drive with a 19-yard completion to Albert Connell, and then a 12-yard run by Stephen Davis set up a 28-yard field goal from Brett Conway with 5:37 remaining in the second quarter. Then in the second half, Brian Mitchell returned the opening kickoff 100 yards for a touchdown, a playoff record. Later in the third quarter, Darrell Green intercepted a pass from Buccaneers quarterback Shaun King and returned it 12 yards to the Buccaneers 36-yard line, setting up Conway's second field goal to take a 13–0 lead. But after a Bucs punt, Tampa Bay safety John Lynch intercepted a pass from Johnson on the Tampa Bay 27-yard line. Aided by a 31-yard pass interference penalty on Leomont Evans, the Buccaneers subsequently drove 73 yards in six plays and scored on Mike Alstott's 2-yard touchdown run. Then in the fourth quarter, defensive tackle Steve White forced a fumble from Johnson while sacking him and Warren Sapp recovered the ball on the Redskins 32-yard line. King then went to work, completing a 17-yard pass to Bert Emanuel and a 13-yard pass to Warrick Dunn. On fourth down and 1, Alstott's 5-yard run moved the ball to the Washington 3-yard line, and King eventually finished the drive with a 1-yard touchdown pass to John Davis.

The Redskins had a chance to win the game with a 51-yard field goal attempt in the final seconds of the game, but the snap from center Dan Turk to Johnson, the holder, was off and the Bucs won. (Contrary to popular belief, the snap was not to Matt Turk, the team's punter and Dan's brother.) It was Dan Turk's last game in the NFL, as he died later that year due to cancer. Meanwhile, King became the first rookie to lead his team to a playoff win since Pat Haden in 1976.

This was the first postseason meeting between the Redskins and Buccaneers.

=== Sunday, January 16, 2000 ===
==== NFC: St. Louis Rams 49, Minnesota Vikings 37 ====
Minnesota Vikings vs. St. Louis Rams – Game summary

Quarter	1	2	3	4	Total
Vikings	3	14	0	20	37
Rams	14	0	21	14	49

at Trans World Dome, St. Louis, Missouri

- Game time: 12:30 p.m. EST/11:30 a.m. CST
- Game weather: Played indoors, domed stadium
- Game attendance: 66,194
- Referee: Walt Coleman
- TV announcers (Fox): Pat Summerall (play-by-play), John Madden (color commentator), D. J. Johnson, and Ron Pitts (sideline reporters)
- Recap, Game Book

Game information

First quarter

- MIN – Gary Anderson 31-yard field goal, 9:23. Vikings 3–0. Drive: 11 plays, 60 yards, 5:37.
- STL – Isaac Bruce 77-yard pass from Kurt Warner (Jeff Wilkins kick), 9:02. Rams 7–3. Drive: 1 play, 77 yards, 0:21.
- STL – Marshall Faulk 41-yard pass from Kurt Warner (Jeff Wilkins kick), 4:19. Rams 14–3. Drive: 4 plays, 82 yards, 1:55.

Second quarter

- MIN – Cris Carter 22-yard pass from Jeff George (Gary Anderson kick), 9:53. Rams 14–10. Drive: 8 plays, 96 yards, 3:42.
- MIN – Leroy Hoard 4-yard run (Gary Anderson kick), 2:40. Vikings 17–14. Drive: 7 plays, 53 yards, 3:43.

Third quarter

- STL – Tony Horne 95-yard kickoff return (Jeff Wilkins kick), 14:42. Rams 21–17. Drive: 0 plays, 0 yards, 0:18.
- STL – Marshall Faulk 1-yard run (Jeff Wilkins kick), 8:28. Rams 28–17. Drive: 9 plays, 51 yards, 4:59.
- STL – Jeff Robinson 13-yard pass from Kurt Warner (Jeff Wilkins kick), 0:22. Rams 35–17. Drive: 8 plays, 61 yards, 4:23.

Fourth quarter

- STL – Ryan Tucker 1-yard pass from Kurt Warner (Jeff Wilkins kick), 13:36. Rams 42–17. Drive: 4 plays, 23 yards, 1:33.
- STL – Roland Williams 2-yard pass from Kurt Warner (Jeff Wilkins kick), 8:13. Rams 49–17. Drive: 8 plays, 62 yards, 4:01.
- MIN – Jake Reed 4-yard pass from Jeff George (Leroy Hoard run), 4:56. Rams 49–25. Drive: 6 plays, 80 yards, 3:17.
- MIN – Randy Moss 44-yard pass from Jeff George (pass failed), 3:48. Rams 49–31. Drive: 5 plays, 63 yards, 1:08.
- MIN – Randy Moss 2-yard pass from Jeff George (pass failed), 0:31. Rams 49–37. Drive: 16 plays, 85 yards, 2:09.

Top passers

- MIN – Jeff George – 29/50, 423 yards, 4 TD, INT
- STL – Kurt Warner – 27/33, 391 yards, 5 TD, INT

Top rushers

- MIN – Robert Smith – 20 rushes, 64 yards
- STL – Marshall Faulk – 11 rushes, 21 yards, TD

Top receivers

- MIN – Randy Moss – 9 receptions, 188 yards, 2 TD
- STL – Isaac Bruce – 4 receptions, 133 yards, TD

As expected, this match between the two high powered offenses produced a lot of points (86), and yards (880, 405 by St. Louis, 475 by Minnesota). But after falling behind 17–14, St. Louis stormed to victory with 35 second half points.

Minnesota took the opening kickoff and drove 60 yards in 11 plays, setting up a Gary Anderson field goal. But after the ensuing kickoff, Rams quarterback Kurt Warner on their first play from scrimmage, threw a 77-yard touchdown pass to Isaac Bruce. A 13-yard sack by Rams safety Billy Jenkins on the Vikings ensuing drive forced a punt, and Warner once again went to work. He threw a 26-yard completion to Bruce and an 11-yarder to Torry Holt before finishing the drive with a 41-yard touchdown pass to running back Marshall Faulk. Another sack, this time by linebacker Charlie Clemons, forced Minnesota to punt again, and once again the Rams decided to go deep, but this time the Vikings were ready, and cornerback Jimmy Hitchcock intercepted Warner's pass at his own 4-yard line.

After the interception, Jeff George led the Vikings 96 yards in eight plays, completing passes to Randy Moss and Jake Reed for gains of 24 and 41 yards and finishing the drive with a 22-yard touchdown completion to Cris Carter, cutting the score to 14–10 5:07 into the second quarter. Later on, Rams cornerback Dexter McCleon intercepted a pass from George on the Vikings 41-yard line. But on the next play, Faulk fumbled a handoff and safety Robert Griffith recovered the ball on the 47. After that, Minnesota took the lead by driving 53 yards and scoring on a 4-yard touchdown run from fullback Leroy Hoard with 2:40 left in the half. Aided by Bruce's 22-yard reception, the Rams responded with a drive to the Minnesota 37-yard line, but a 9-yard sack by defensive tackle John Randle pushed St. Louis out of field goal range and the score remained 17–14 by halftime.

The momentum seemed to be in Minnesota's favor, but the Rams suddenly exploded with 35 points in the second half. First, St. Louis receiver Tony Horne returned the second half kickoff 95 yards for a touchdown. The Vikings were forced to punt on their next possession, and Az-Zahir Hakim returned the ball 15 yards with a facemask penalty adding another 5, giving the Rams a first down on Minnesota's 49-yard line. Faulk rushed three times for 14 yards and then Warner completed an 18-yard pass to Roland Williams at the Vikings 14-yard line. After an 8-yard reception from Bruce, Faulk scored on a 1-yard touchdown run, increasing St. Louis' lead to 28–17. The Vikings had to punt again on their next drive, and Warner subsequently led the Rams 62 yards in 11 plays on the way to a 13-yard touchdown pass to tight end Jeff Robinson with 13 seconds left in the third quarter. After the ensuing kickoff, Rams defensive tackle D'Marco Farr recovered a fumbled snap from George on the Vikings 23-yard line. Warner then completed passes to Holt and Hakim for eight and 10 yards, then ran four yards to the 1-yard line. Warner finished the drive with a 1-yard touchdown pass to offensive lineman Ryan Tucker on a tackle-eligible play.

After another Vikings punt, Warner led the Rams 62 yards in eight plays and capped off the drive with a 2-yard touchdown pass to Williams, increasing St. Louis' lead to 49–17 with just over eight minutes left in regulation. George, who completed only two of eight passes for −9 yards in the second half until then, responded with three touchdown passes in the final five minutes of the game. His 42-yard completion to Moss on the ensuing drive set up his 4-yard touchdown pass to Reed. Then Carter recovered an onside kick, and the Vikings scored another touchdown on George's 44-yard pass to Moss. Following a Rams punt, Minnesota drove 85 yards in 16 plays to score on George's 2-yard touchdown toss to Moss, but by then only 35 seconds remained on the clock.

Warner finished his first career playoff game completing 27 of 33 passes for 391 yards, five touchdowns, and an interception. Bruce caught four passes for 133 yards and a touchdown. Hakim rushed for five yards, caught five passes for 49 yards, and returned three punts for 72 yards. Horne set a franchise postseason record with 174 kickoff return yards. Jenkins had 11 tackles and a sack. George completed 29 of 50 passes for 423 yards, four touchdowns, and an interception. Moss caught nine passes for 188 yards and two touchdowns. Carter caught seven passes for 106 yards and a score.

This was the first NFL postseason game ever played in St. Louis.

This was the seventh postseason meeting between the Vikings and Rams. Minnesota previously won five of the prior six meetings while the Rams were in Los Angeles.

Previous playoff games
Minnesota leads 5–2 in all-time playoff games

1969

Los Angeles Rams 20 @ Minnesota Vikings 23

1969 NFL Western Conf. playoff

1974

Los Angeles Rams 7 @ Minnesota Vikings 27

1974 NFC Championship Game

1976

Los Angeles Rams 13 @ Minnesota Vikings 24

1976 NFC Championship Game

1977

Minnesota Vikings 14 @ Los Angeles Rams 7

1977 NFC Divisional playoffs

1978

Minnesota Vikings 10 @ Los Angeles Rams 34

1978 NFC Divisional playoffs

1988

Los Angeles Rams 17 @ Minnesota Vikings 28

1988 NFC Wild Card playoffs

==== AFC: Tennessee Titans 19, Indianapolis Colts 16 ====
Tennessee Titans vs. Indianapolis Colts – Game summary

Quarter	1	2	3	4	Total
Titans	0	6	7	6	19
Colts	3	6	0	7	16

at RCA Dome, Indianapolis

- Game time: 4:00 p.m. EST
- Game weather: Played indoors, domed stadium
- Game attendance: 60,314
- Referee: Johnny Grier
- TV announcers (CBS): Greg Gumbel (play-by-play), Phil Simms (color commentator), and Armen Keteyian (sideline reporter)

Game information

First quarter

- IND – Mike Vanderjagt 40-yard field goal, 7:13. Colts 3–0. Drive: 9 plays, 42 yards, 4:15.

Second quarter

- TEN – Al Del Greco 49-yard field goal, 14:56. Tied 3–3. Drive: 7 plays, 46 yards, 3:06.
- IND – Mike Vanderjagt 40-yard field goal, 5:38. Colts 6–3. Drive: 7 plays, 62 yards, 4:37.
- TEN – Al Del Greco 37-yard field goal, 3:15. Tied 6–6. Drive: 7 plays, 34 yards, 2:23.
- IND – Mike Vanderjagt 34-yard field goal, 0:01. Colts 9–6. Drive: 12 plays, 66 yards, 3:14.

Third quarter

- TEN – Eddie George 68-yard run (Al Del Greco kick), 13:19. Titans 13–9. Drive: 3 plays, 80 yards, 1:41.

Fourth quarter

- TEN – Al Del Greco 25-yard field goal, 12:57. Titans 16–9. Drive: 13 plays, 73 yards, 6:21.
- TEN – Al Del Greco 43-yard field goal, 4:19. Titans 19–9. Drive: 7 plays, 17 yards, 3:36.
- IND – Edgerrin James 2-yard run (Mike Vanderjagt kick), 1:51. Titans 19–16. Drive: 9 plays, 61 yards, 1:20.

Top passers

- TEN – Steve McNair – 13/24, 112 yards
- IND – Peyton Manning – 19/42, 227 yards

Top rushers

- TEN – Eddie George – 26 rushes, 162 yards, TD
- IND – Edgerrin James – 20 rushes, 56 yards, TD

Top receivers

- TEN – Chris Sanders – 2 receptions, 38 yards
- IND – Marvin Harrison – 5 receptions, 65 yards

Although the Indianapolis Colts, behind second year quarterback Peyton Manning, had posted some gaudy numbers en route to a sterling 13–3 regular season record, the upstart Tennessee Titans paid them little respect. Running back Eddie George rushed for a team playoff-record 162 yards, including a 68-yard touchdown, to help lead the Titans to victory. Manning endured a rough playoff debut as he completed only 19 of 42 passes.

Despite George's impressive day, he actually struggled for most of the first half, gaining only 38 yards on nine carries while kickers Mike Vanderjagt and Al Del Greco spent the first two quarters trading field goals. Indianapolis scored first on their second drive with a 42-yard drive that ended with a 40-yard field goal by Vanderjagt. After a punt from each team, Tennessee drove 46 yards to tie the score on Del Greco's 49-yard field goal on the first play of the second quarter. Following two more punts, Indy put together the longest drive so far from either team, moving the ball 62 yards in seven plays, including Manning's 33-yard completion to receiver E. G. Green, to take a 6–3 lead on Vanderjagt's 40-yard field goal. Derrick Mason returned the ensuing kickoff 47 yards to the Titans' 47-yard line. Two plays later, a 29-yard scramble from quarterback Steve McNair set up Del Greco's 37-yard field goal kick. Manning then completed 5/6 passes for 57 yards and rushed for seven on a 66-yard drive that ended with the team taking a 9–6 lead with Vanderjagt's 34-yard field goal with six seconds left in the first half.

Tennessee's inability to get into the end zone came to an end on just the third play of the third quarter, when George took a handoff from McNair and stormed through the middle of the field for a 68-yard touchdown run. Then after several punts, the Titans put together a 13-play, 73-yard drive, featuring a 26-yard completion from McNair to receiver Chris Sanders. With 12:57 left in the fourth quarter, Del Greco finished the drive with his third field goal, increasing the Tennessee lead to 16–9. Later in the quarter, the Colts had a great opportunity to come back when wide receiver Terrence Wilkins returned a punt 87 yards to the Titans 3-yard line, but it was overruled by a replay challenge from coach Jeff Fisher. Fisher had to burn a timeout to get his challenge heard over the roaring crowd in the RCA Dome, but it paid off, as the replay showed Wilkins had stepped out of bounds at his own 33-yard line during the return.

The lost opportunity was devastating. Indianapolis went three-and-out on their ensuing possession and Mason returned their punt 19 yards to the Colts 42-yard line, setting up Del Greco's fourth field goal to make the score 19–9. The Colts then turned the ball over on downs with their next drive, but managed to get it back with 3:11 left when defensive end Mark Thomas recovered a fumble from George on the Indianapolis 39. The Colts then drove 61 yards in nine plays to score on a 15-yard touchdown run by Manning, but by then there was only 1:50 left in the game and Titans receiver Yancey Thigpen sealed the victory by recovering Vanderjagt's onside kick.

This was the first postseason meeting between the Titans and Colts.

== Conference championships ==
=== Sunday, January 23, 2000 ===
==== AFC: Tennessee Titans 33, Jacksonville Jaguars 14 ====
Tennessee Titans vs. Jacksonville Jaguars – Game summary

Quarter	1	2	3	4	Total
Titans	7	3	16	7	33
Jaguars	7	7	0	0	14

at Alltel Stadium, Jacksonville, Florida

- Game time: 12:30 p.m. EST
- Game weather: 75 °F (24 °C), partly cloudy
- Game attendance: 75,206
- Referee: Bernie Kukar
- TV announcers (CBS): Greg Gumbel (play-by-play), Phil Simms (color commentator), Armen Keteyian, and Bonnie Bernstein (sideline reporters)
- Recap, Game Book

Game information

First quarter

- JAX – Kyle Brady 7-yard pass from Mark Brunell (Mike Hollis kick), 11:20. Jaguars 7–0. Drive: 5 plays, 62 yards, 1:59.
- TEN – Yancey Thigpen 9-yard pass from Steve McNair (Al Del Greco kick), 5:30. Tied 7–7. Drive: 9 plays, 51 yards, 5:50.

Second quarter

- JAX – James Stewart 33-yard run (Mike Hollis kick), 4:36. Jaguars 14–7. Drive: 4 plays, 65 yards, 1:58.
- TEN – Al Del Greco 34-yard field goal, 0:20. Jaguars 14–10. Drive: 4 plays, 3 yards, 1:14.

Third quarter

- TEN – Steve McNair 1-yard run (Al Del Greco kick), 9:24. Titans 17–14. Drive: 6 plays, 76 yards, 3:09.
- TEN – Mark Brunell sacked in end zone by Josh Evans, 5:13. Titans 19–14.
- TEN – Derrick Mason 80-yard kick return, 4:56. Titans 26–14.

Fourth quarter

- TEN – Steve McNair 1-yard run (Al Del Greco kick), 6:59. Titans 33–14. Drive: 4 plays, 61 yards, 2:13.

Top passers

- TEN – Steve McNair – 14/23, 112 yards, TD, INT
- JAX – Mark Brunell – 19/38, 226 yards, TD, 2 INT

Top rushers

- TEN – Steve McNair – 9 rushes, 91 yards, 2 TD
- JAX – Fred Taylor – 19 rushes, 110 yards

Top receivers

- TEN – Jackie Harris – 3 receptions, 33 yards
- JAX – Jimmy Smith – 5 receptions, 92 yards

The Jacksonville Jaguars had been one of the NFL's best teams in the 1999 season, pacing the AFC with a 14–2 record. However, both of those losses came at the hands of their opponents in the AFC Championship Game, the Tennessee Titans. The Titans proved up to the task of beating their division rival once again as the Titans scored a resounding 33–14 victory. The Titans advanced to their first Super Bowl in team history by forcing six turnovers and a safety.

Jacksonville took the opening kickoff and started out strong, gaining 51 yards on their first two plays. First, Mark Brunell completed an 18-yard pass to Jimmy Smith, and then Fred Taylor ran 33 yards to the Titans 13-yard line. Three plays later, Brunell threw a 7-yard touchdown pass to tight end Kyle Brady. But Tennessee struck right back. First, Derrick Mason returned the ensuing kickoff 44 yards to the Titans 49-yard line. Then quarterback Steve McNair completed three passes for 23 yards and rushed for 14 on a 51-yard drive that ended with his 9-yard touchdown pass to Yancey Thigpen.

In the second quarter, the Jaguars drove 72 yards to the Titans 5-yard line, only to have Brunell throw an interception to safety Marcus Robertson in the end zone. But after forcing a punt, they drove 65 yards in four plays and took a 14–7 lead with a 33-yard touchdown run from James Stewart. Tennessee was forced to punt again on their next drive, but Reggie Barlow muffed the kick and Steve Jackson recovered the ball for the Titans on the Jacksonville 19-yard line. After that, Al Del Greco kicked a 34-yard field goal, cutting the score to 14–10 with 20 seconds left in the half.

The Titans defense dominated the second half, forcing four turnovers, while the offense took advantage of key penalties to take control of the game. On Tennessee's first drive of the second half, McNair completed a 15-yard pass to Eddie George at midfield, with a roughing the passer penalty on Tony Brackens adding another 15 yards. Two plays later, cornerback Fernando Bryant committed a 28-yard pass interference penalty while trying to cover Kevin Dyson, moving the ball to the Jaguars 6-yard line. After a 5-yard run by George, McNair scored on a 1-yard touchdown run, giving Tennessee their first lead of the game, 17–14.

On Jacksonville's next drive, Brady fumbled while being tackled by Robinson, and defensive tackle Jason Fisk recovered the ball at the Jaguars 35-yard line. McNair subsequently led his team to the 7-yard line, but then linebacker Kevin Hardy stripped the ball away from tight end Frank Wycheck and Lonnie Marts recovered the ball on the 1.

Then Tennessee's defense stepped up. First, linebacker Barron Wortham stuffed Taylor for no gain. Then Josh Evans and Fisk shared a sack on Brunell in the end zone for a safety. After that, Mason returned the free kick 80 yards for a touchdown, giving the Titans a 26–14 lead. Jacksonville reached the Titans 36-yard line on their next drive, but turned the ball over on downs with Brunell's incomplete pass on fourth down and 2.

In the fourth quarter, Brunell fumbled while being sacked by Kenny Holmes and Jevon Kearse initially recovered it on the 15-yard line. However, he attempted to lateral the ball to Samari Rolle, who fumbled the pitch, and receiver Keenan McCardell recovered it. But a few plays later, Brunell turned the ball over again when he threw an interception to rookie safety Donald Mitchell at the Titans 39-yard line. On the ensuing drive, McNair ripped off a 51-yard run, then scored on a 1-yard touchdown run to put the game away.

McNair completed 14 of 23 passes for 112 yards, a touchdown, and an interception, and rushed for 91 yards and two touchdowns. Mason returned four kickoffs for 174 yards and two punts for 14 yards. Taylor rushed for 110 yards and caught two passes for 16 yards. This was the Jaguars' last home playoff game until 2017.

This was the first postseason meeting between the Titans and Jaguars.

==== NFC: St. Louis Rams 11, Tampa Bay Buccaneers 6 ====
Tampa Bay Buccaneers vs. St. Louis Rams – Game summary

Quarter	1	2	3	4	Total
Buccaneers	3	0	3	0	6
Rams	3	2	0	6	11

at Trans World Dome, St. Louis, Missouri

- Game time: 4:00 p.m. EST/3:00 p.m. CST
- Game weather: Played indoors, domed stadium
- Game attendance: 66,396
- Referee: Bill Carollo
- TV announcers (Fox): Pat Summerall (play-by-play), John Madden (color commentator), D. J. Johnson, and Ron Pitts (sideline reporters)
- Recap, Game Book

Game information

First quarter

- TB – Martin Gramatica 25-yard field goal, 12:22. Buccaneers 3–0. Drive: 6 plays, 13 yards, 2:23.
- STL – Jeff Wilkins 24-yard field goal, 4:17. Tied 3–3. Drive: 16 plays, 74 yards, 8:05.

Second quarter

- STL – Tony Mayberry fumble out of bounds in the end zone for a safety, 14:55. Rams 5–3.

Third quarter

- TB – Martin Gramatica 23-yard field goal, 10:38. Buccaneers 6–5. Drive: 9 plays, 66 yards, 4:32.

Fourth quarter

- STL – Ricky Proehl 30-yard pass from Kurt Warner (pass failed), 4:44. Rams 11–6. Drive: 6 play, 47 yards, 3:17.

Top passers

- TB – Shaun King – 13/29, 163 yards, 2 INT
- STL – Kurt Warner – 26/43, 258 yards, TD, 3 INT

Top rushers

- TB – Mike Alstott – 12 rushes, 39 yards
- STL – Marshall Faulk – 17 rushes, 44 yards

Top receivers

- TB – Jacquez Green – 4 receptions, 59 yards
- STL – Ricky Proehl – 6 receptions, 100 yards, TD

In a hard-fought defensive struggle in which both teams combined for only 512 yards and lost a total of five turnovers, Rams quarterback Kurt Warner's 30-yard touchdown pass to Ricky Proehl with 4:44 left in the game was just enough to edge out Tampa Bay.

On the first scrimmage play of the game, Bucs defensive end Steve White intercepted a screen pass from Warner on the Rams 20-yard line, setting up a 25-yard field goal from Martín Gramática. The Rams responded by driving 74 yards in 16 plays with Warner completing seven of 10 passes for 61 yards, including a 22-yard completion to tight end Roland Williams. But on third-and-goal from the Bucs 7-yard line, a fumbled handoff exchange from Warner to Marshall Faulk forced them to settle for a 24-yard field goal by Jeff Wilkins.

The second quarter was full of missed opportunities and poor play from both teams. On the first play, a high snap from Bucs center Tony Mayberry went over quarterback Shaun King's head and into the end zone. King managed to knock the ball out of the end zone to prevent a touchdown, but it gave the Rams a safety and a 5–3 lead. Az-Zahir Hakim returned the free kick 15-yards to the Rams 40-yard line. Hakim also caught a 14-yard pass and ran for six as the team drove to the Bucs 26, but the drive halted there and Wilkins missed a 44-yard field goal attempt. Following a punt from each team, Tampa Bay also got good field position from a 14-yard punt return from Karl Williams that gave them a first down on the Rams 45. Although they drove to the St. Louis 26, they ultimately fared no better than the Rams did. On third down, King fumbled while being sacked by Charlie Clemons. King recovered the ball, but the 13-yard loss pushed the team out of field goal range. The next time Tampa Bay had the ball, King threw a pass from the Rams 41 that went right into the arms of St. Louis cornerback Todd Lyght. A few plays later, the half ended with the score still 5–3, despite the Rams' 159–75 advantage over the Buccaneers in total yards.

Just as in the first half, Tampa Bay scored a field goal on their opening drive on the third quarter, set up by a 32-yard reception by Jacquez Green and a 15-yard facemask penalty on Taje Allen. Meanwhile, Warner was intercepted twice by the Buccaneers defense, including a costly interception to Hardy Nickerson on the Tampa Bay 3-yard line. But late in the fourth quarter, Rams cornerback Dré Bly intercepted a pass from King at the Buccaneers 49-yard line. Several plays later, Warner threw a 30-yard touchdown pass to Proehl with 4:44 left, taking an 11–6 lead after the two-point conversion failed. King responded by leading the Bucs deep into St. Louis territory. With 1:25 left, his 22-yard completion to Williams gave the team a first down on the Rams 22-yard line. But on the next play, he was sacked by Grant Wistrom for a 13-yard loss. After that, his potential 11-yard completion to Bert Emanuel was controversially overturned by a replay challenge. (The play led the NFL to adopt the "Bert Emanuel rule" after the season, which still allows for a catch to be ruled if a receiver maintains possession and control of the ball even if the ball touches the ground.) King then threw two consecutive incompletions, turning the ball over on downs.

Proehl was the sole offensive star of the game, finishing with six catches for 100 yards and a touchdown.

En route to attending the game, Kansas City Chiefs star linebacker and future Hall of Famer Derrick Thomas was involved in a car accident in Kansas City that led to his death two weeks later from the injuries he sustained.

This was the second postseason meeting between the Buccaneers and Rams. The Rams won the only prior meeting while in Los Angeles, leading to the Rams first ever appearance in a Super Bowl.

Previous playoff games
St. Louis/ Los Angeles Rams leads 1–0 in all-time playoff games

1979

Los Angeles Rams 9 @ Tampa Bay Buccaneers 0

1979 NFC Championship Game

== Super Bowl XXXIV: St. Louis Rams 23, Tennessee Titans 16 ==
Super Bowl XXXIV – St. Louis Rams vs. Tennessee Titans – Game summary

Quarter	1	2	3	4	Total
Rams (NFC)	3	6	7	7	23
Titans (AFC)	0	0	6	10	16

at Georgia Dome, Atlanta

- Date: January 30, 2000
- Game attendance: 72,625
- Referee: Bob McElwee
- TV announcers (ABC): Al Michaels (play-by-play) and Boomer Esiason (color commentator)

This was the first Super Bowl meeting between the Rams and Titans.
