= Terry McAulay =

American football official (born 1959)

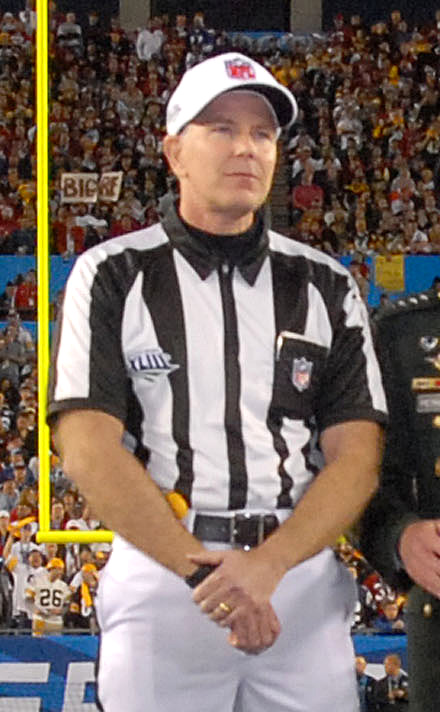
- McAulay at Super Bowl XLIII in 2009
- Born: December 24, 1959 (age 66); Brownsville, Texas, U.S.
- Education: Louisiana State University
- Occupation: NFL official (1998–2018)
- Notable credit: NBC Rules analyst (2018–present)

Terry McAulay (born December 24, 1959) is a former American football official who worked in the National Football League (NFL) for the 1998 through 2017 seasons. He was the referee for seven conference championship games and three Super Bowls (XXXIX, XLIII, and XLVIII). He was the Coordinator of Football Officials for college football's Big East and subsequently the American Athletic Conference from 2008 to 2017.

== Personal life ==
Born in Brownsville, Texas, McAulay was raised in Hammond, Louisiana. He is a graduate of Louisiana State University with a degree in computer science. Beginning in 1982, McAulay was a software programmer for the National Security Agency. He retired in 2008.

== Officiating career ==
=== Early years ===
McAulay's football officiating career began in 1976, including many years at the high school level in Howard County, Maryland. Prior to joining the NFL, McAulay was a referee in the Atlantic Coast Conference from 1994 to 1997, and was the referee for the BCS National Championship Game at the Miami Orange Bowl, in 1998.

=== NFL career ===
McAulay began his NFL officiating career in 1998 first as a side judge on Walt Coleman's crew, then as a side judge on Tony Corrente's crew in 1999, working the wild card game between the Miami Dolphins and the Seattle Seahawks at the end of that season. He later worked the 2000 NFC Championship Game between the Minnesota Vikings and the New York Giants, which was his last game at that position before he became a referee at the start of the 2001 NFL season. He wore uniform number 77 (now worn by Terry Killens). Coincidentally, McAulay wore the same number and originally worked at the same position that was vacated by Mike Pereira, who served as the NFL's Vice President of Officiating from 2001 until February 2010.

He was the first referee to work a Super Bowl with fewer than five seasons experience as a referee when he was the crew chief for Super Bowl XXXIX between the New England Patriots and the Philadelphia Eagles, which came at the end of his fourth season as a referee and is one of only six NFL referees to have worked three or more Super Bowls. McAulay worked 17 playoff games during his NFL career, including 8 conference championship games, Super Bowl XXXIX, Super Bowl XLIII between the Pittsburgh Steelers and the Arizona Cardinals, and Super Bowl XLVIII between the Seattle Seahawks and the Denver Broncos. At the time of his retirement, he was considered one of the top referees in the NFL.

McAulay refereed the 2017 Monday Night Football season opener between the Los Angeles Chargers and Denver Broncos, which was the Chargers' first game since relocating to Los Angeles. When the Chargers called a first quarter timeout, McAulay mistakenly called them "San Diego".

==== "Bottlegate" incident ====
McAulay was the referee in the Jacksonville Jaguars' 15–10 victory over the Cleveland Browns at Cleveland Browns Stadium on December 16, 2001, which ended with a display of unruly fan behavior. The Browns wide receiver Quincy Morgan caught a pass for a first down on 4th and 1 as they were driving toward the end zone looking for the winning score. The Browns then ran another play, which would normally prevent the completed pass from being reviewed. Despite this, citing a "malfunction of the replay system", McAulay reviewed the catch and determined that Morgan never had control of the ball. The pass was called incomplete and the Jaguars were awarded the ball. However, fans in the "Dawg Pound" began throwing plastic beer bottles and other objects at players and officials. McAulay then declared the game over and sent the teams to the locker rooms. NFL Commissioner Paul Tagliabue called the game supervisor to override McAulay's decision to end the game prematurely, sending the players back onto the field after a thirty-minute delay, where the Jaguars ran out the last seconds under a hail of debris.

=== Retirement ===
For the 2017 NFL season, McAulay's final season with the NFL, his officiating crew consisted of umpire Steve Woods, down judge Jerry Bergman, line judge Carl Johnson, field judge Michael Banks, side judge Jonah Monroe, and back judge Rich Martinez.

On June 21, 2018, McAulay retired from the league to become a rules analyst for NBC Sports' NBC Sunday Night Football and Notre Dame football. His referee position was taken by umpire Shawn Smith. He is also the rules analyst for Thursday Night Football on Amazon Prime starting in 2022 joining Al Michaels, Kirk Herbstreit and Kaylee Hartung.
