= Abdul-Karim al-Jabbar =

American football player (born 1974)

Abdul-Karim Al-Jabbar
No. 33, 27
- Position: Running back

Personal information
- Born: June 28, 1974 (age 52); Los Angeles, California, U.S.
- Listed height: 5 ft 10 in (1.78 m)
- Listed weight: 194 lb (88 kg)

Career information
- High school: Dorsey (Los Angeles)
- College: UCLA (1992–1995)
- NFL draft: 1996: 3rd round, 80th overall pick

Career history
- Miami Dolphins (1996–1999); Cleveland Browns (1999); Indianapolis Colts (2000)

Awards and highlights
- NFL rushing touchdowns co-leader (1997); PFWA All-Rookie Team (1996); Second-team All-American (1995); First-team All-Pac-10 (1995); Second-team All-Pac-10 (1994)

Career NFL statistics
- Rushing yards: 3,411
- Rushing average: 3.4
- Rushing touchdowns: 33
- Stats at Pro Football Reference

Abdul-Karim al-Jabbar (born Sharmon Shah; June 28, 1974), known previously as Karim Abdul-Jabbar, is an American former professional football player who was a running back in the National Football League (NFL). Abdul-Karim played college football for the UCLA Bruins, earning second-team All-American honors in 1995. He was selected in the third round of the 1996 NFL draft by the Miami Dolphins. He also played for the Cleveland Browns and Indianapolis Colts.

== College career ==
Born in Los Angeles, Abdul-Karim attended the University of California, Los Angeles, where he played for the Bruins from 1992 to 1995 under head coach Terry Donahue. He set the school record for rushing yards in a season and was named team MVP in consecutive years under the names 'Sharmon Shah' in 1994 and 'Karim Abdul-Jabbar' in 1995. He was a three-year letterman and two-year starter at UCLA. Despite leaving school with one season of eligibility remaining, he ranks third on the Bruins' all-time rushing list with 3,030 yards on 482 carries (5.2 avg.) with 26 touchdowns. He also added 36 receptions for 885 yards with 9 touchdown. Karim averaged 110.1 total yards per game in college and was the only player in school history (and seventh in Pac-10 annals) to rush for over 1,600 yards.

== Professional career ==
Pre-draft measurables
Height	Weight	Arm length	Hand span	20-yard shuttle	Vertical jump
5 ft 10 in (1.78 m)	194 lb (88 kg)	31 1/8 in (0.79 m)	9 3/4 in (0.25 m)	4.29 s	32.5 in (0.83 m)

=== Miami Dolphins ===
Abdul-Karim was drafted in the third round of the 1996 NFL draft by the Miami Dolphins, with whom he would play three and a half seasons. In his rookie year, he set many of the Dolphins' rookie records for rushing by a running back. He became only the second Dolphin to lead the team in rushing in each of his first two seasons in the league. In 1997, he led the NFL in total touchdowns with 16 and tied Denver Broncos running back Terrell Davis for the league lead with 15 rushing touchdowns. Afterwards his productivity decreased. In 1999, he started the first three games for the Dolphins before getting deactivated and benched for rookies Cecil Collins and J.J. Johnson. He was subsequently traded to the Cleveland Browns. At the time of the trade, he was second in Dolphins history with 33 rushing touchdowns and fifth in franchise history with 3,063 rushing yards.

=== Cleveland Browns ===
On October 19, 1999, the Dolphins traded him to the 0–6 expansion Cleveland Browns for a sixth-round draft pick in the 2000 NFL draft. He started 6 of the 10 games he played in Cleveland, finishing second on the team with 350 yards on 115 rushing attempts. He did not re-sign with the team following the season.

=== Indianapolis Colts ===
On July 13, 2000, the Colts signed Abdul-Karim to a one-year contract to replace the late Fred Lane, who was murdered by his wife the week before. Abdul-Karim carried the ball one time for negative two yards in one appearance for Indianapolis.

== NFL career statistics ==
Legend
	Led the league
**Bold**	Career high

=== Regular season ===
Year	Team	Games		Rushing					Receiving					Fum
Year	Team	GP	GS	Att	Yds	Avg	Lng	TD	Rec	Yds	Avg	Lng	TD	Fum
1996	MIA	**16**	14	**307**	**1,116**	**3.6**	29	11	23	139	6.0	23	0	**4**
1997	MIA	**16**	14	283	892	3.2	22	**15**	**29**	**261**	**9.0**	**36**	**1**	3
1998	MIA	15	**15**	270	960	**3.6**	**45**	6	21	102	4.9	18	0	2
1999	MIA	3	3	28	95	3.4	12	1	4	25	6.3	14	0	0
1999	CLE	10	6	115	350	3.0	21	0	13	59	4.5	21	**1**	0
2000	IND	1	0	1	−2	−2.0	−2	0	0	0	0.0	0	0	0
Career		61	52	1,004	3,411	3.4	45	33	90	586	6.5	36	2	9

== Name controversy ==
In 1995, Abdul-Karim, a Muslim convert, was given the name "Karim Abdul-Jabbar" by his imam. The new name he was given quickly garnered major attention upon his NFL debut. Some commentators mistakenly believed that he was the son of former basketball great Kareem Abdul-Jabbar, who also attended UCLA (under the name Lew Alcindor) and who himself has a son named Kareem. He also wore number 33, the same number worn by the basketball player.

The name controversy was periodically spoofed on postgame recaps, such as in 1996 when Chris Berman of ESPN called an Abdul-Jabbar touchdown rush with an imitation of Marv Albert, who was famous for announcing basketball as well as football games.

The controversy eventually led to the basketball player suing the football player in 1997. The lawsuit led to the football player changing his legal name to Abdul-Karim al-Jabbar.

== Personal ==
Abdul-Karim was a childhood friend of Keyshawn Johnson.
