= Oronde =

Oronde is a given name. Notable people with the given name include:

- Oronde Bascome (born 1988), Bermudian cricketer
- Oronde Gadsden (born 1971), American football player
- Oronde Gadsden II (born 2003), American football player

== See also ==
- Jamael Orondé "Rondé" Barber (born 1975), American football player
