= 1999 Miami Dolphins season =

34th season in franchise history; final one for Dan Marino

- Owner: Wayne Huizenga
- Head coach: Jimmy Johnson
- Home stadium: Pro Player Stadium

Results
- Record: 9–7
- Division place: 3rd AFC East
- Playoffs: Won Wild Card Playoffs (at Seahawks) 20–17; Lost Divisional Playoffs (at Jaguars) 7–62
- Pro Bowlers: LB Zach Thomas; CB Sam Madison; K Olindo Mare

The 1999 Miami Dolphins season was the team's 34th campaign, and 30th in the National Football League (NFL). It was the 17th and final season for Dolphins quarterback Dan Marino. Marino suffered an injury on October 17 against the New England Patriots, with Damon Huard taking over at quarterback. The team would go 4–1 under Huard, including a 17–0 victory over the Tennessee Titans. Marino would return on November 25, against the Dallas Cowboys, throwing five interceptions in the 20–0 loss.

The Dolphins reached the midway point of the 1999 season with a 7–1 record, but in the second half of the year, the team struggled, finishing out the season 2–6, winning only one game after Marino's return. The team finished the season 9–7, beating out the Kansas City Chiefs for the AFC's last wild card spot via tiebreakers; Miami held a better record against common opponents, going 6–1 to the Chiefs' 5–3. In the Wild Card round, the Dolphins upset the no. 3 seed Seattle Seahawks 20–17. In the Divisional round, the Dolphins were humiliated by the no. 1 seed Jacksonville Jaguars, losing 62–7, the most lopsided playoff loss in the Super Bowl era.

== Offseason ==
=== 1999 NFL draft ===
1999 Miami Dolphins draft
Round	Selection	Player	Position	College	Notes
2	39	J. J. Johnson	RB	Mississippi State	from Detroit
2	43	Rob Konrad	FB	Syracuse	from Kansas City
3	72	Grey Ruegamer	C	Arizona State	from Baltimore via Tampa Bay
5	134	Cecil Collins	RB	McNeese State	
5	142	Bryan Jones	LB	Oregon State	from Detroit
6	192	Brent Bartholomew	P	Ohio State	
7	232	Jermaine Haley	DT	Butte	from Green Bay via Detroit
7	244	Joe Wong	OT	BYU	

== Roster ==
1999 Miami Dolphins roster
Quarterbacks (QB): 16 Jim Druckenmiller; 11 Damon Huard; 13 Dan Marino; 14 Scott Zolak; Running backs (RB): 21 Autry Denson; 37 Brian Edwards; 32 J. J. Johnson; 44 Rob Konrad FB; 36 Stanley Pritchett FB; Wide receivers (WR): 86 Oronde Gadsden; 87 Yatil Green; 88 Nate Jacquet PR; 80 Tony Martin; 81 O. J. McDuffie PR; 82 Kevin McKenzie; Tight ends (TE): 84 Troy Drayton; 83 Hunter Goodwin; 89 Ed Perry LS	Offensive linemen (OL): 76 James Brown T; 63 Mark Dixon G; 65 Kevin Donnalley G; 66 Kevin Gogan G; 61 Tim Ruddy C; 62 Grey Ruegamer C; 68 Mike Sheldon T; 74 Brent Smith T; 78 Richmond Webb T; Defensive linemen (DL): 93 Trace Armstrong DE; 95 Tim Bowens DT; 91 Lorenzo Bromell DE/DT; 92 Daryl Gardener DT; 79 Kenny Mixon DE; 96 Rich Owens DE; 98 Antoine Simpson DT; 99 Jason Taylor DE	Linebackers (LB): 57 O. J. Brigance MLB; 51 Anthony Harris OLB; 50 Dwight Hollier OLB; 53 Larry Izzo OLB; 52 Robert Jones OLB; 59 Derrick Rodgers OLB; 54 Zach Thomas MLB; Defensive backs (DB): 27 Terrell Buckley CB/PR; 28 Ray Hill CB; 38 Calvin Jackson SS; 25 Greg Jeffries CB; 29 Sam Madison CB; 31 Brock Marion FS/KR; 23 Patrick Surtain CB; 22 Shawn Wooden SS; 24 Jerry Wilson CB/S; Special teams (ST): 4 Tom Hutton P; 10 Olindo Mare K	Practice squad: 67 Ben Adams T; 46 Frank Leatherwood FB; 64 O'Lester Pope G; 19 Larry Shannon WR; Reserve: 16 Robert Baker WR (IR); 48 Kantroy Barber RB (IR); 6 Brent Bartholomew P (IR); 60 John Bock C (IR); 34 Cecil Collins RB (Susp.); 17 Kio Sanford WR (IR); 94 Walter Scott DT (IR); 85 Lamar Thomas WR (IR); 71 Joe Wong T (IR); Rookies in italics 53 active, 9 reserve, 4 practice squad

== Regular season ==
=== Schedule ===
Week	Date	Opponent	Result	Record	Venue	Recap
1	September 13	at Denver Broncos	**W** 38–21	1–0	Mile High Stadium	Recap
2	September 19	Arizona Cardinals	**W** 19–16	2–0	Pro Player Stadium	Recap
3	Bye					
4	October 4	**Buffalo Bills**	**L** 18–23	2–1	Pro Player Stadium	Recap
5	October 10	at **Indianapolis Colts**	**W** 34–31	3–1	RCA Dome	Recap
6	October 17	at **New England Patriots**	**W** 31–30	4–1	Foxboro Stadium	Recap
7	October 24	Philadelphia Eagles	**W** 16–13	5–1	Pro Player Stadium	Recap
8	October 31	at Oakland Raiders	**W** 16–9	6–1	Network Associates Coliseum	Recap
9	November 7	Tennessee Titans	**W** 17–0	7–1	Pro Player Stadium	Recap
10	November 14	at **Buffalo Bills**	**L** 3–23	7–2	Ralph Wilson Stadium	Recap
11	November 21	**New England Patriots**	**W** 27–17	8–2	Pro Player Stadium	Recap
12	November 25	at Dallas Cowboys	**L** 0–20	8–3	Texas Stadium	Recap
13	December 5	**Indianapolis Colts**	**L** 34–37	8–4	Pro Player Stadium	Recap
14	December 12	at **New York Jets**	**L** 20–28	8–5	Giants Stadium	Recap
15	December 19	San Diego Chargers	**W** 12–9	9–5	Pro Player Stadium	Recap
16	December 27	**New York Jets**	**L** 31–38	9–6	Pro Player Stadium	Recap
17	January 2	at Washington Redskins	**L** 10–21	9–7	Jack Kent Cooke Stadium	Recap
Note: Intra-division opponents are in **bold** text.

=== Standings ===
AFC East
	W	L	T	PCT	PF	PA	STK
^{(2)} Indianapolis Colts	13	3	0	.813	423	333	L1
^{(5)} Buffalo Bills	11	5	0	.688	320	229	W3
^{(6)} Miami Dolphins	9	7	0	.563	326	336	L2
New York Jets	8	8	0	.500	308	309	W4
New England Patriots	8	8	0	.500	299	284	W1

=== Game summaries ===
==== Week 1 at Denver Broncos ====
Week One: Miami Dolphins at Denver Broncos

Quarter	1	2	3	4	Total
**Dolphins**	0	17	7	14	**38**
Broncos	7	0	7	7	**21**

at Mile High Stadium, Denver, Colorado

- Date: September 13
- Game time: 9:00 p.m.
- Game weather: 60 °F (16 °C), wind 5 MPH
- Game attendance: 75,623
- Referee: Johnny Grier
- TV announcers (ABC): Al Michaels (play-by-play) & Boomer Esiason (color commentator)
- Recap

Game information

**First quarter**

- DEN – Ed McCaffrey 61-yard pass from Brian Griese (Jason Elam kick), 11:15. Broncos 7–0.

**Second quarter**

- MIA – Karim Abdul-Jabbar 1-yard run (Olindo Mare kick), 8:54. Tied 7–7.
- MIA – Rob Konrad 6-yard pass from Dan Marino (Olindo Mare kick), 3:02. Dolphins 14–7.
- MIA – Olindo Mare 37-yard field goal, 0:07. Dolphins 17–7.

**Third quarter**

- MIA – J. J. Johnson 1-yard run (Olindo Mare kick), 10:02. Dolphins 24–7.
- DEN – Ed McCaffrey 11-yard pass from Brian Griese (Jason Elam kick), 3:42. Dolphins 24–14.

**Fourth quarter**

- MIA – O. J. McDuffie 4-yard pass from Dan Marino (Olindo Mare kick), 9:31. Dolphins 31–14.
- MIA – Jason Taylor 4-yard fumble return (Olindo Mare kick), 3:56. Dolphins 38–14.
- DEN – Ed McCaffrey 4-yard pass from Brian Griese (Jason Elam kick), 0:34. Dolphins 38–21.

**Top passers**

- MIA – Dan Marino – 15/23, 215 yards, 2 TD
- DEN – Brian Griese – 24/40, 270 yards, 3 TD

**Top rushers**

- MIA – Karim Abdul-Jabbar – 16 rushes, 60 yards, TD
- DEN – Terrell Davis – 19 rushes, 61 yards

**Top receivers**

- MIA – Tony Martin – 4 receptions, 101 yards
- DEN – Ed McCaffrey – 6 receptions, 105 yards, 3 TD

The Dolphins opened the season on the road against the defending Super Bowl champion Denver Broncos. The Broncos were without their longtime quarterback John Elway, who announced his retirement during the off-season. Brian Griese, son of former Dolphins quarterback Bob Griese, was Denver's starting quarterback, throwing a 61-yard touchdown pass to Ed McCaffrey early in the 1st quarter. Griese would play inconsistently for the rest of the game and was sacked twice, while Dan Marino was sacked zero times. In the 4th quarter, Griese fumbled the ball, with Jason Taylor recovering it and running it into the end zone for a touchdown.

==== Week 2 vs. Arizona Cardinals ====
Week Two: Arizona Cardinals at Miami Dolphins

Quarter	1	2	3	4	Total
Cardinals	0	13	3	0	**16**
**Dolphins**	3	10	6	0	**19**

at Pro Player Stadium, Miami, Florida

- Date: September 19
- Game time: 1:00 p.m.
- Game weather: 82 °F (28 °C), wind 13 MPH
- Game attendance: 73,618
- Referee: Bob McElwee
- TV announcers (Fox): Ray Bentley (play-by-play) & Ron Pitts (color commentator)
- Recap

Game information

**First quarter**

- MIA – Olindo Mare 39-yard field goal, 5:53. Dolphins 3–0.

**Second quarter**

- MIA – Olindo Mare 51-yard field goal, 14:09. Dolphins 6–0.
- ARI – Chris Jacke 36-yard field goal, 6:54. Dolphins 6–3.
- ARI – Chris Jacke 44-yard field goal, 5:44. Tied 6–6.
- ARI – Rob Fredrickson 34-yard interception return (Chris Jacke kick), 5:20. Cardinals 13–6.
- MIA – Troy Drayton 10-yard pass from Dan Marino (Olindo Mare kick), 0:25. Tied 13–13.

**Third quarter**

- ARI – Chris Jacke 38-yard field goal, 9:12. Cardinals 16–13.
- MIA – Olindo Mare 48-yard field goal, 5:11. Tied 16–16.
- MIA – Olindo Mare 44-yard field goal, 4:26. Dolphins 19–16.

**Top passers**

- ARI – Jake Plummer – 11/27, 112 yards, 4 INT
- MIA – Dan Marino – 21/35, 221 yards, TD, 2 INT

**Top rushers**

- ARI – Adrian Murrell – 20 rushes, 59 yards
- MIA – Cecil Collins – 15 rushes, 45 yards

**Top receivers**

- ARI – Frank Sanders – 7 receptions, 76 yards
- MIA – O. J. McDuffie – 4 receptions, 85 yards

The Dolphins' defense picked off Cardinals quarterback Jake Plummer four times during the game. Arizona only scored one touchdown during the game, a 34-yard interception return by Rob Fredrickson in the 2nd quarter.

==== Week 4 at Buffalo Bills ====
Week Four: Buffalo Bills at Miami Dolphins

Quarter	1	2	3	4	Total
**Bills**	3	10	0	10	**23**
Dolphins	6	3	0	9	**18**

at Pro Player Stadium, Miami, Florida

- Date: October 4
- Game time: 9:00 p.m.
- Game weather: 79 °F (26 °C), no wind
- Game attendance: 74,073
- Referee: Bill Carollo
- TV announcers (ABC): Al Michaels (play-by-play) & Boomer Esiason (color commentator)
- Recap

Game information

**First quarter**

- BUF – Steve Christie 26-yard field goal, 10:46. Bills 3–0.
- MIA – Olindo Mare 30-yard field goal, 6:46. Tied 3–3.
- MIA – Olindo Mare 44-yard field goal, 1:57. Dolphins 6–3.

**Second quarter**

- BUF – Steve Christie 52-yard field goal, 12:58. Tied 6–6.
- BUF – Gabe Northern 59-yard fumble return (Steve Christie kick), 4:31. Bills 13–6.
- MIA – Olindo Mare 26-yard field goal, 0:00. Bills 13–9.

**Third quarter**

- No scoring plays

**Fourth quarter**

- MIA – Olindo Mare 26-yard field goal, 13:23. Bills 13–12.
- BUF – Eric Moulds 6-yard pass from Doug Flutie (Steve Christie kick), 10:02. Bills 20–12.
- BUF – Steve Christie 31-yard field goal, 6:56. Bills 23–12.
- MIA – O. J. McDuffie 9-yard pass from Dan Marino (run failed), 5:13. Bills 23–18.

**Top passers**

- BUF – Doug Flutie – 12/25, 186 yards, TD
- MIA – Dan Marino – 22/44, 251 yards, TD, 2 INT

**Top rushers**

- BUF – Antowain Smith – 12 rushes, 36 yards
- MIA – Cecil Collins – 16 rushes, 47 yards

**Top receivers**

- BUF – Jay Riemersma – 4 receptions, 85 yards
- MIA – O. J. McDuffie – 7 receptions, 64 yards, TD

==== Week 5 at Indianapolis Colts ====
Week Five: Miami Dolphins at Indianapolis Colts

Quarter	1	2	3	4	Total
**Dolphins**	3	6	0	25	**34**
Colts	3	7	7	14	**31**

at RCA Dome, Indianapolis, Indiana

- Date: October 10
- Game time: 4:15 p.m.
- Game weather: None (Domed stadium)
- Game attendance: 56,810
- Referee: Gerry Austin
- TV announcers (CBS): Greg Gumbel (play-by-play) & Phil Simms (color commentator)
- Recap

Game information

**First quarter**

- IND – Mike Vanderjagt 41-yard field goal, 11:19. Colts 3–0.
- MIA – Olindo Mare 37-yard field goal, 1:41. Tied 3–3.

**Second quarter**

- MIA – Olindo Mare 27-yard field goal, 9:45. Dolphins 6–3.
- IND – Marvin Harrison 33-yard pass from Peyton Manning (Mike Vanderjagt kick), 4:39. Colts 10–6.
- MIA – Olindo Mare 21-yard field goal, 0:24. Colts 10–9.

**Third quarter**

- IND – Marcus Pollard 9-yard pass from Peyton Manning (Mike Vanderjagt kick), 8:34. Colts 17–9.

**Fourth quarter**

- MIA – Tony Martin 28-yard pass from Dan Marino (pass failed), 13:08. Colts 17–15.
- IND – Terrence Wilkins 97-yard kick return (Mike Vanderjagt kick), 12:52. Colts 24–15.
- MIA – Cecil Collins 25-yard run (Olindo Mare kick), 9:45. Colts 24–22.
- IND – Marcus Pollard 32-yard pass from Peyton Manning (Mike Vanderjagt kick), 8:14. Colts 31–22.
- MIA – Olindo Mare 43-yard field goal, 3:20. Colts 31–25.
- MIA – Peyton Manning ran out of end zone, 1:54. Colts 31–27.
- MIA – Oronde Gadsden 2-yard pass from Dan Marino (Olindo Mare kick), 0:27. Dolphins 34–31.

**Top passers**

- MIA – Dan Marino – 25/38, 393 yards, 2 TD
- IND – Peyton Manning – 17/24, 274 yards, 3 TD, INT

**Top rushers**

- MIA – Cecil Collins – 21 rushes, 76 yards, TD
- IND – Edgerrin James – 22 rushes, 81 yards

**Top receivers**

- MIA – Tony Martin – 10 receptions, 166 yards, TD
- IND – Marvin Harrison – 3 receptions, 91 yards, TD

The Dolphins were trailing 31–22 in the 4th quarter before staging a furious comeback with just under 3:30 left to play, scoring 12 unanswered points in the span of nearly 3 minutes. The run started with a 43-yard field goal from Olindo Mare with 3:20 left. With 1:54 left, Miami's defense forced Peyton Manning to run out the end zone, resulting in a safety. On the ensuing drive, Dan Marino led the offense down the field, capping it off with a 2-yard pass to Oronde Gadsden for the game-winning score. The Dolphins' defense sealed the game, with Terrell Buckley intercepting a Manning pass on the Colts' final drive of the game.

Miami compiled 469 yards of offense and committed no turnovers. Marino threw for 393 yards while two players finished with over 100 yards receiving: Gadsden with 123 yards and Tony Martin with 166.

==== Week 6 at New England Patriots ====
Week Six: Miami Dolphins at New England Patriots

Quarter	1	2	3	4	Total
**Dolphins**	3	16	0	12	**31**
Patriots	14	10	3	3	**30**

at Foxboro Stadium, Foxborough, Massachusetts

- Date: October 17
- Game time: 1:00 p.m.
- Game weather: 72 °F (22 °C), wind 5 MPH
- Game attendance: 60,006
- Referee: Ed Hochuli
- TV announcers (CBS): Greg Gumbel (play-by-play) & Phil Simms (color commentator)
- Recap

Game information

**First quarter**

- NE – Andy Katzenmoyer 57-yard interception return (Adam Vinatieri kick), 12:06. Patriots 7–0.
- NE – Ty Law 27-yard interception return (Adam Vinatieri kick), 8:04. Patriots 14–0.
- MIA – Olindo Mare 20-yard field goal, 1:04. Patriots 14–3.

**Second quarter**

- MIA – Olindo Mare 33-yard field goal, 11:29. Patriots 14–6.
- MIA – Tony Martin 69-yard pass from Damon Huard (Olindo Mare kick), 7:48. Patriots 14–13.
- NE – Adam Vinatieri 41-yard field goal, 6:40. Patriots 17–13.
- MIA – Olindo Mare 45-yard field goal, 1:26. Patriots 17–16.
- NE – Tony Simmons 29-yard pass from Drew Bledsoe (Adam Vinatieri kick), 0:23. Patriots 24–16.
- MIA – Olindo Mare 45-yard field goal, 0:02. Patriots 24–19.

**Third quarter**

- NE – Adam Vinatieri 39-yard field goal, 12:23. Patriots 27–19.

**Fourth quarter**

- MIA – Olindo Mare 41-yard field goal, 13:25. Patriots 27–22.
- NE – Adam Vinatieri 34-yard field goal, 9:05. Patriots 30–22.
- MIA – Olindo Mare 53-yard field goal, 2:45. Patriots 30–25.
- MIA – Stanley Pritchett 5-yard pass from Damon Huard (pass failed), 0:23. Dolphins 31–30.

**Top passers**

- MIA – Damon Huard – 24/42, 240 yards, 2 TD, INT
- NE – Drew Bledsoe – 17/36, 225 yards, TD, INT

**Top rushers**

- MIA – Cecil Collins – 20 rushes, 59 yards
- NE – Terry Allen – 10 rushes, 19 yards

**Top receivers**

- MIA – Tony Martin – 7 receptions, 115 yards, TD
- NE – Vincent Brisby – 3 receptions, 68 yards

Dan Marino's only completion of the game was on a 8-yard pass that put him over 60,000 passing yards for his career. On Marino's second pass attempt, he was hit by Lawyer Milloy, with Andy Katzenmoyer intercepting the ball and returning it 57 yards for a touchdown. On the following drive, Marino would attempt a short pass that fell short of his intended receiver. Coach Jimmy Johnson would pull Marino from the game due to a possible shoulder injury; in the week heading into the game, Marino thought he might have injured his right trapezius. Marino was replaced by Damon Huard, whose first pass was intercepted by Ty Law and returned 27 yards for a touchdown. Despite the rocky start, Huard would lead the Dolphins to a 31–30 comeback victory, throwing a 5-yard touchdown pass to fullback Stanley Pritchett with 23 seconds left in the game for the game-winning score.

==== Week 7 vs. Philadelphia Eagles ====
Week Seven: Philadelphia Eagles at Miami Dolphins

Quarter	1	2	3	4	Total
Eagles	0	3	7	3	**13**
**Dolphins**	10	3	0	3	**16**

at Pro Player Stadium, Miami, Florida

- Date: October 24
- Game time: 1:00 p.m.
- Game weather: 75 °F (24 °C), wind 12 MPH
- Game attendance: 73,975
- Referee: Larry Nemmers
- TV announcers (Fox): Josh Lewin (play-by-play) & Ray Bentley (color commentator)
- Recap

Game information

**First quarter**

- MIA – Olindo Mare 37-yard field goal, 6:05. Dolphins 3–0.
- MIA – J. J. Johnson 18-yard run (Olindo Mare kick), 1:04. Dolphins 10–0.

**Second quarter**

- PHI – David Akers 53-yard field goal, 11:10. Dolphins 10–3.
- MIA – Olindo Mare 37-yard field goal, 6:26. Dolphins 13–3.

**Third quarter**

- PHI – Brian Dawkins 67-yard interception return (Norm Johnson kick), 3:47. Dolphins 13–10.

**Fourth quarter**

- MIA – Olindo Mare 53-yard field goal, 14:55. Dolphins 16–10.
- PHI – Norm Johnson 44-yard field goal, 6:08. Dolphins 16–13.

**Top passers**

- PHI – Doug Pederson – 13/25, 108 yards, INT
- MIA – Damon Huard – 15/21, 142 yards, INT

**Top rushers**

- PHI – Duce Staley – 19 rushes, 73 yards
- MIA – Cecil Collins – 26 rushes, 97 yards

**Top receivers**

- PHI – Charles Johnson – 4 receptions, 59 yards
- MIA – O. J. McDuffie – 4 receptions, 41 yards

With Dan Marino out due to injury, Damon Huard started at quarterback for the Dolphins, his first NFL start.

==== Week 8 at Oakland Raiders ====
Week Eight: Miami Dolphins at Oakland Raiders

Quarter	1	2	3	4	Total
**Dolphins**	3	7	3	3	**16**
Raiders	3	0	6	0	**9**

at Network Associates Coliseum

- Date: October 31
- Game time: 1:00 p.m.
- Game weather: 70 °F (21 °C), wind 10 mph
- Game attendance: 61,556
- Referee: Ron Winter
- TV announcers (CBS): Greg Gumbel (play-by-play) & Phil Simms (color commentator)
- Recap

Game information

**First quarter**

- OAK – Michael Husted 49-yard field goal, 11:54. Raiders 3–0.
- MIA – Olindo Mare 21-yard field goal, 4:53. Tied 3–3.

**Second quarter**

- MIA – Cecil Collins 1-yard run (Olindo Mare kick), 6:34. Dolphins 10–3.

**Third quarter**

- OAK – Michael Husted 34-yard field goal, 10:56. Dolphins 10–6.
- MIA – Olindo Mare 34-yard field goal, 6:06. Dolphins 13–6.
- OAK – Michael Husted 47-yard field goal, 3:14. Dolphins 13–9.

**Fourth quarter**

- MIA – Olindo Mare 44-yard field goal, 3:21. Dolphins 16–9.

**Top passers**

- MIA – Damon Huard – 16/32, 221 yards
- OAK – Rich Gannon – 7/28, 130 yards, INT

**Top rushers**

- MIA – J. J. Johnson – 21 rushes, 86 yards
- OAK – Napoleon Kaufman – 8 rushes, 39 yards

**Top receivers**

- MIA – Oronde Gadsden – 3 receptions, 70 yards
- OAK – Tim Brown – 7 receptions, 113 yards

Damon Huard started at quarterback for the second week in a row. After having thrown a pick six in each of the previous two games, Huard committed no turnovers against Oakland.

==== Week 9 vs. Tennessee Titans ====
Week Nine: Tennessee Titans at Miami Dolphins

Quarter	1	2	3	4	Total
Titans	0	0	0	0	**0**
**Dolphins**	0	14	0	3	**17**

at Pro Player Stadium, Miami, Florida

- Date: November 7
- Game time: 8:20 p.m.
- Game weather: 74 °F (23 °C), wind 13 MPH
- Game attendance: 74,109
- Referee: Jeff Triplette
- TV announcers (ESPN): Mike Patrick (play-by-play), Joe Theismann (color commentator) & Paul Maguire (sideline reporter)
- Recap

Game information

**First quarter**

- No scoring plays

**Second quarter**

- MIA – Stanley Pritchett 6-yard pass from Damon Huard (Olindo Mare kick), 13:43. Dolphins 7–0.
- MIA – Tony Martin 43-yard pass from Damon Huard (Olindo Mare kick), 7:27. Dolphins 14–0.

**Third quarter**

- No scoring plays

**Fourth quarter**

- MIA – Olindo Mare 46-yard field goal, 14:55. Dolphins 17–0.

**Top passers**

- TEN – Steve McNair – 22/42, 205 yards, 3 INT
- MIA – Damon Huard – 15/25, 210 yards, 2 TD

**Top rushers**

- TEN – Eddie George – 14 rushes, 65 yards
- MIA – Cecil Collins – 14 rushes, 41 yards

**Top receivers**

- TEN – Yancey Thigpen – 5 receptions, 60 yards
- MIA – Tony Martin – 5 receptions, 95 yards, TD

The Dolphins' defense shutout the Titans, picking off Steve McNair three times. This was one of only three games that Tennessee would lose during the regular season.

==== Week 10 at Buffalo Bills ====
Week Ten: Miami Dolphins at Buffalo Bills

Quarter	1	2	3	4	Total
Dolphins	0	3	0	0	**3**
**Bills**	9	7	7	0	**23**

at Ralph Wilson Stadium, Orchard Park, New York

- Date: November 14
- Game time: 1:00 p.m.
- Game weather: 46 °F (8 °C), wind 21 MPH
- Game attendance: 72,810
- Referee: Tony Corrente
- TV announcers (CBS): Greg Gumbel (play-by-play) & Phil Simms (color commentator)
- Recap

Game information

**First quarter**

- BUF – Steve Christie 31-yard field goal, 11:29. Bills 3–0.
- BUF – Steve Christie 48-yard field goal, 6:44. Bills 6–0.
- BUF – Steve Christie 47-yard field goal, 3:45. Bills 9–0.

**Second quarter**

- BUF – Jonathan Linton 4-yard run (Steve Christie kick), 11:03. Bills 16–0.
- MIA – Olindo Mare 30-yard field goal, 0:45. Bills 16–3.

**Third quarter**

- BUF – Eric Moulds 53-yard pass from Doug Flutie (Steve Christie kick), 6:43. Bills 23–3.

**Fourth quarter**

- No scoring plays

**Top passers**

- MIA – Damon Huard – 9/25, 65 yards, INT
- BUF – Doug Flutie – 10/20, 157 yards, TD

**Top rushers**

- MIA – J. J. Johnson – 12 rushes, 50 yards
- BUF – Antowain Smith – 29 rushes, 126 yards

**Top receivers**

- MIA – Tony Martin – 2 receptions, 27 yards
- BUF – Eric Moulds – 1 receptions, 53 yards, TD

Damon Huard struggled throughout the game, only completing 36% of his passes for 65 yards with no touchdowns and one interception. This was the only game of the season Miami would lose with Huard starting at quarterback.

==== Week 11 vs. New England Patriots ====
Week Eleven: New England Patriots at Miami Dolphins

Quarter	1	2	3	4	Total
Patriots	7	3	7	0	**17**
**Dolphins**	3	7	14	3	**27**

at Pro Player Stadium, Miami, Florida

- Date: November 21
- Game time: 1:00 p.m.
- Game weather: 74 °F (23 °C), wind 8 MPH
- Game attendance: 74,295
- Referee: Ron Blum
- TV announcers (CBS): Greg Gumbel (play-by-play) & Phil Simms (color commentator)
- Recap

Game information

**First quarter**

- NE – Terry Allen 6-yard run (Adam Vinatieri kick), 7:25. Patriots 7–0.
- MIA – Olindo Mare 19-yard field goal, 3:00. Patriots 7–3.

**Second quarter**

- NE – Adam Vinatieri 27-yard field goal, 14:08. Patriots 10–3.
- MIA – Oronde Gadsden 4-yard pass from Damon Huard (Olindo Mare kick), 8:24. Tied 10–10.

**Third quarter**

- MIA – Oronde Gadsden 3-yard pass from Damon Huard (Olindo Mare kick), 8:55. Dolphins 17–10.
- MIA – J. J. Johnson 1-yard run (Olindo Mare kick), 3:19. Dolphins 24–10.
- NE – Shawn Jefferson 68-yard pass from Drew Bledsoe (Adam Vinatieri kick), 2:50. Dolphins 24–17.

**Fourth quarter**

- MIA – Olindo Mare 23-yard field goal, 3:11. Dolphins 27–17.

**Top passers**

- NE – Drew Bledsoe – 15/34, 201 yards, TD, 5 INT
- MIA – Damon Huard – 18/30, 129 yards, 2 TD

**Top rushers**

- NE – Kevin Faulk – 5 rushes, 61 yards
- MIA – J. J. Johnson – 31 rushes, 106 yards, TD

**Top receivers**

- NE – Shawn Jefferson – 2 receptions, 86 yards, TD
- MIA – Tony Martin – 4 receptions, 44 yards

Miami's defense picked off Drew Bledsoe five times. This was the last game of the season Damon Huard would start at quarterback, as Dan Marino would return for the following game four days later. Miami finished 4–1 with Huard as starter.

==== Week 12 at Dallas Cowboys ====
NFL on Thanksgiving Day

Week Twelve: Miami Dolphins at Dallas Cowboys

Quarter	1	2	3	4	Total
Dolphins	0	0	0	0	**0**
**Cowboys**	0	0	7	13	**20**

at Texas Stadium, Irving, Texas

- Date: November 25
- Game time: 4:15 p.m.
- Game weather: 57 °F (14 °C), wind 6 MPH
- Game attendance: 64,328
- Referee: Johnny Grier
- TV announcers (CBS): Greg Gumbel (play-by-play) & Phil Simms (color commentator)
- Recap

Game information

**First quarter**

- No scoring plays

**Second quarter**

- No scoring plays

**Third quarter**

- DAL – Dexter Coakley 46-yard interception return (Richie Cunningham kick), 7:08. Cowboys 7–0.

**Fourth quarter**

- DAL – Richie Cunningham 36-yard field goal, 11:47. Cowboys 10–0.
- DAL – Rocket Ismail 65-yard pass from Troy Aikman (Richie Cunningham kick), 6:24. Cowboys 17–0.
- DAL – Richie Cunningham 23-yard field goal, 1:57. Cowboys 20–0.

**Top passers**

- MIA – Dan Marino – 15/36, 178 yards, 5 INT
- DAL – Troy Aikman – 16/29, 232 yards, TD

**Top rushers**

- MIA – J. J. Johnson – 19 rushes, 63 yards
- DAL – Emmitt Smith – 31 rushes, 103 yards

**Top receivers**

- MIA – Stanley Pritchett – 5 receptions, 59 yards
- DAL – Rocket Ismail – 5 receptions, 125 yards, TD

Dan Marino's first game after returning from injury was a disaster. Marino threw five interceptions, one of which was returned 46 yards by Dexter Coakley in the 3rd quarter for the first score of the game. The Dolphins' defense tried to help keep the team in the game, shutting out the Cowboys' offense for three quarters. The game's only offensive score came in the 4th, with Troy Aikman throwing a 65-yard touchdown pass to Rocket Ismail.

==== Week 13 vs. Indianapolis Colts ====
Week Thirteen: Indianapolis Colts at Miami Dolphins

Quarter	1	2	3	4	Total
**Colts**	17	7	7	6	**37**
Dolphins	3	7	14	10	**34**

at Pro Player Stadium, Miami, Dolphins

- Date: December 5
- Game time: 1:00 p.m.
- Game weather: 75 °F (24 °C), wind 10 MPH
- Game attendance: 74,096
- Referee: Mike Carey
- TV announcers (CBS): Verne Lundquist (play-by-play) & Dan Dierdorf (color commentator)
- Recap

Game information

**First quarter**

- IND – Mike Vanderjagt 44-yard field goal, 8:10. Colts 3–0.
- MIA – Olindo Mare 31-yard field goal, 3:02. Tied 3–3.
- IND – Edgerrin James 41-yard run (Mike Vanderjagt kick), 0:42. Colts 10–3.
- IND – Chad Cota 25-yard fumble return, 0:19. Colts 17–3.

**Second quarter**

- MIA – Oronde Gadsden 24-yard pass from Dan Marino (Olindo Mare kick), 5:16. Colts 17–10.
- IND – Edgerrin James 1-yard run (Mike Vanderjagt kick), 0:57. Colts 24–10.

**Third quarter**

- MIA – Sam Madison 21-yard interception return (Olindo Mare kick), 14:11. Colts 24–17.
- IND – Terrence Wilkins 5-yard pass from Peyton Manning (Mike Vanderjagt kick), 9:28. Colts 31–17.
- MIA – Tony Martin 33-yard pass from Dan Marino (Olindo Mare kick), 3:53. Colts 31–24.

**Fourth quarter**

- MIA – Stanley Pritchett 1-yard pass from Dan Marino (Olindo Mare kick), 13:07. Tied 31–31.
- IND – Mike Vanderjagt 48-yard field goal, 4:24. Colts 34–31.
- MIA – Olindo Mare 32-yard field goal, 0:36. Tied 34–34.
- IND – Mike Vanderjagt 53-yard field goal, 0:00. Colts 37–34.

**Top passers**

- IND – Peyton Manning – 23/29, 260 yards, TD, 2 INT
- MIA – Dan Marino – 24/38, 313 yards, 3 TD, INT

**Top rushers**

- IND – Edgerrin James – 23 rushes, 130 yards, 2 TD
- MIA – J. J. Johnson – 21 rushes, 62 yards

**Top receivers**

- IND – Marvin Harrison – 8 receptions, 125 yards
- MIA – Tony Martin – 6 receptions, 109 yards, TD

The Dolphins trailed 24–10 at halftime, but tied the game twice in the 4th quarter, including a 32-yard field goal from Olindo Mare with 0:36 left in regulation. However, Indianapolis kicker Mike Vanderjagt made a 53-yard field goal as time expired to give the Colts a 37–34 victory.

==== Week 14 at New York Jets ====
Week Fourteen: Miami Dolphins at New York Jets

Quarter	1	2	3	4	Total
Dolphins	6	0	7	7	**20**
**Jets**	0	6	0	22	**28**

at Giants Stadium, East Rutherford, New Jersey

- Date: December 12
- Game time: 4:05 p.m.
- Game weather: 46 °F (8 °C), wind 12 MPH
- Game attendance: 78,246
- Referee: Ed Hochuli
- TV announcers (CBS): Verne Lundquist (play-by-play) & Dan Dierdorf (color commentator)
- Recap

Game information

**First quarter**

- MIA – Olindo Mare 24-yard field goal, 2:48. Dolphins 3–0.
- MIA – Olindo Mare 33-yard field goal, 1:09. Dolphins 6–0.

**Second quarter**

- NYJ – John Hall 28-yard field goal, 7:35. Dolphins 6–3.
- NYJ – John Hall 31-yard field goal, 0:51. Tied 6–6.

**Third quarter**

- MIA – Stanley Pritchett 1-yard run (Olindo Mare kick), 6:43. Dolphins 13–6.

**Fourth quarter**

- NYJ – Keyshawn Johnson 26-yard pass from Ray Lucas (John Hall kick), 14:54. Tied 13–13.
- NYJ – Keyshawn Johnson 24-yard pass from Ray Lucas, 9:34. Jets 19–13.
- NYJ – John Hall 46-yard field goal, 2:51. Jets 22–13.
- NYJ – Omar Stoutmire 67-yard interception return, 1:44. Jets 28–13.
- MIA – Oronde Gadsden 8-yard pass from Damon Huard (Olindo Mare kick), 0:17. Jets 28–20.

**Top passers**

- MIA – Dan Marino – 19/40, 188 yards, 2 INT
- NYJ – Ray Lucas – 22/38, 230 yards, 2 TD

**Top rushers**

- MIA – Stanley Pritchett – 17 rushes, 68 yards, TD
- NYJ – Curtis Martin – 24 rushes, 75 yards

**Top receivers**

- MIA – Yatil Green – 4 receptions, 73 yards
- NYJ – Keyshawn Johnson – 11 receptions, 144 yards, 2 TD

The Dolphins had a 13–6 lead at the start of the 4th quarter, but the team collapsed in the final quarter of play. The Jets scored 22 unanswered points in the 4th quarter, including a 67-yard interception return by Omar Stoutmire.

==== Week 15 vs. San Diego Chargers ====
Week Fifteen: San Diego Chargers at Miami Dolphins

Quarter	1	2	3	4	Total
Chargers	0	3	0	6	**9**
**Dolphins**	3	3	0	6	**12**

at Pro Player Stadium, Miami, Florida

- Date: December 19
- Game time: 1:00 p.m.
- Game weather: 81 °F (27 °C), wind 9 MPH
- Game attendance: 73,765
- Referee: Phil Luckett
- TV announcers (CBS): Kevin Harlan (play-by-play) & Sam Wyche (color commentator)
- Recap

Game information

**First quarter**

- MIA – Olindo Mare 32-yard field goal, 7:19. Dolphins 3–0.

**Second quarter**

- SD – John Carney 23-yard field goal, 14:57. Tied 3–3.
- MIA – Olindo Mare 21-yard field goal, 5:28. Dolphins 6–3.

**Third quarter**

- No scoring plays

**Fourth quarter**

- SD – John Carney 22-yard field goal, 14:57. Tied 6–6.
- SD – John Carney 31-yard field goal, 10:11. Chargers 9–6.
- MIA – Olindo Mare 30-yard field goal, 6:06. Tied 9–9.
- MIA – Olindo Mare 31-yard field goal, 3:22. Dolphins 12–9.

**Top passers**

- SD – Jim Harbaugh – 20/48, 178 yards
- MIA – Dan Marino – 22/36, 241 yards

**Top rushers**

- SD – Terrell Fletcher – 5 rushes, 12 yards
- MIA – Stanley Pritchett – 15 rushes, 38 yards

**Top receivers**

- SD – Terrell Fletcher – 9 receptions, 66 yards
- MIA – Tony Martin – 8 receptions, 86 yards

Neither team managed to a score a touchdown during the game. The Dolphins' defense held the Chargers to 186 yards of total offense and forced one turnover. This was the last regular season game Dan Marino would win in his career.

==== Week 16 vs. New York Jets ====
Week Sixteen: New York Jets at Miami Dolphins

Quarter	1	2	3	4	Total
**Jets**	10	7	7	14	**38**
Dolphins	7	7	7	10	**31**

at Pro Player Stadium, Miami, Florida

- Date: December 27
- Game time: 9:00 p.m.
- Game weather: 63 °F (17 °C), wind 8 MPH
- Game attendance: 74,230
- Referee: Bob McElwee
- TV announcers (ABC): Al Michaels (play-by-play) & Boomer Esiason (color commentator)
- Recap

Game information

**First quarter**

- NYJ – Keyshawn Johnson 4-yard pass from Ray Lucas (John Hall kick), 8:16. Jets 7–0.
- MIA – Ed Perry 1-yard pass from Dan Marino (Olindo Mare kick), 5:37. Tied 7–7.
- NYJ – John Hall 48-yard field goal, 0:07. Jets 10–7.

**Second quarter**

- NYJ – Marcus Coleman 98-yard interception return (John Hall kick), 8:41. Jets 17–7.
- MIA – Stanley Pritchett 3-yard pass from Dan Marino (Olindo Mare kick), 2:46. Jets 17–14.

**Third quarter**

- MIA – Tony Martin 32-yard pass from Dan Marino (Olindo Mare kick), 11:01. Dolphins 21–17.
- NYJ – Curtis Martin 1-yard run (John Hall kick), 7:01. Jets 24–21.

**Fourth quarter**

- MIA – J. J. Johnson 1-yard run (Olindo Mare kick), 13:32. Dolphins 28–24.
- NYJ – Wayne Chrebet 50-yard pass from Ray Lucas (John Hall kick), 10:41. Jets 31–28.
- NYJ – Dedric Ward 56-yard pass from Ray Lucas (John Hall kick), 8:56. Jets 38–28.
- MIA – Olindo Mare 37-yard field goal, 2:20. Jets 38–31.

**Top passers**

- NYJ – Ray Lucas – 11/23, 190 yards, 3 TD
- MIA – Dan Marino – 29/52, 322 yards, 3 TD, 3 INT

**Top rushers**

- NYJ – Curtis Martin – 20 rushes, 72 yards, TD
- MIA – J. J. Johnson – 18 rushes, 83 yards, TD

**Top receivers**

- NYJ – Wayne Chrebet – 3 receptions, 62 yards, TD
- MIA – Tony Martin – 6 receptions, 102 yards, TD

==== Week 17 at Washington Redskins ====
Week Seventeen: Miami Dolphins at Washington Redskins

Quarter	1	2	3	4	Total
Dolphins	0	3	0	7	**10**
**Redskins**	0	7	7	7	**21**

at Jack Kent Cooke Stadium, Landover, Maryland

- Date: January 2, 2000
- Game time: 4:15 p.m.
- Game weather: 67 °F (19 °C), wind 15 MPH
- Game attendance: 78,106
- Referee: Dick Hantak
- TV announcers (CBS): Greg Gumbel (play-by-play) & Phil Simms (color commentator)
- Recap

Game information

**First quarter**

- No scoring plays

**Second quarter**

- WAS – Skip Hicks 8-yard run (Brett Conway kick), 4:51. Redskins 7–0.
- MIA – Olindo Mare 39-yard field goal, 2:29. Redskins 7–3.

**Third quarter**

- WAS – Irving Fryar 30-yard pass from Rodney Peete (Brett Conway kick), 14:06. Redskins 14–3.

**Fourth quarter**

- WAS – Larry Centers 4-yard pass from Rodney Peete (Brett Conway kick), 6:25. Redskins 21–3.
- MIA – Oronde Gadsden 4-yard pass from Damon Huard (Olindo Mare kick), 3:09. Redskins 21–10.

**Top passers**

- MIA – Damon Huard – 18/29, 162 yards, TD, INT
- WAS – Rodney Peete – 6/9, 99 yards, 2 TD

**Top rushers**

- MIA – Autry Denson – 21 rushes, 80 yards
- WAS – Skip Hicks – 22 rushes, 53 yards, TD

**Top receivers**

- MIA – Oronde Gadsden – 9 receptions, 114 yards, TD
- WAS – Stephen Alexander – 2 receptions, 38 yards

Dan Marino started at quarterback, but was pulled from the game and replaced by Damon Huard; Marino finished 11-of-24 for 118 yards with one interception. Despite the loss, the Dolphins still qualified for the playoffs as the Chiefs lost earlier in the day to the Raiders.

== Playoffs ==
Playoff round	Date	Opponent (seed)	Result	Record	Venue	Recap
Wild Card	January 9, 2000	at Seattle Seahawks (3)	W 20–17	1–0	The Kingdome	Recap
Divisional	January 15, 2000	at Jacksonville Jaguars (1)	L 7–62	1–1	Alltel Stadium	Recap

=== AFC Wild Card Playoffs: at (3) Seattle Seahawks ===
AFC Wild Card Game: (6) Miami Dolphins at (3) Seattle Seahawks

Quarter	1	2	3	4	Total
Dolphins	3	0	10	7	20
Seahawks	7	3	7	0	17

at The Kingdome, Seattle, Washington

- Game time: 4:00 p.m. EST/1:00 p.m. PST
- Game weather: None (domed stadium)
- Game attendance: 66,170
- Referee: Tony Corrente
- TV announcers (CBS): Greg Gumbel (play-by-play), Phil Simms (color commentator), and Armen Keteyian (sideline reporter)
- Recap

Game information

First quarter

- SEA – Sean Dawkins 9-yard pass from Jon Kitna (Todd Peterson kick), 6:18. Seahawks 7–0. Drive: 8 plays, 47 yards, 3:35.
- MIA – Olindo Mare 32-yard field goal, 2:05. Seahawks 7–3. Drive: 7 plays, 37 yards, 4:13.

Second quarter

- SEA – Todd Peterson 50-yard field goal, 0:45. Seahawks 10–3. Drive: 8 plays, 49 yards, 3:45.

Third quarter

- MIA – Oronde Gadsden 1-yard pass from Dan Marino (Olindo Mare kick), 8:55. Tied 10–10. Drive: 10 plays, 60 yards, 6:05.
- SEA – Charlie Rogers 85-yard kick return (Todd Peterson kick), 8:37. Seahawks 17–10.
- MIA – Olindo Mare 50-yard field goal, 2:22. Seahawks 17–13. Drive: 6 plays, 32 yards, 3:12.

Fourth quarter

- MIA – J. J. Johnson 2-yard run (Olindo Mare kick), 4:48. Dolphins 20–17. Drive: 11 plays, 85 yards, 4:21.

Top passers

- MIA – Dan Marino – 17/30, 196 yards, TD
- SEA – Jon Kitna – 14/30, 162 yards, TD, 2 INT

Top rushers

- MIA – J. J. Johnson – 27 rushes, 86 yards, TD
- SEA – Ricky Watters – 19 rushes, 40 yards

Top receivers

- MIA – O. J. McDuffie – 5 receptions, 82 yards
- SEA – Sean Dawkins – 3 receptions, 35 yards, TD

The Seattle Seahawks played host to their first playoff game since the 1984 season. The Seahawks were dominated by the Dolphins defense, who held them to only 171 yards, with just 32 in the second half, and sacked Seahawks quarterback Jon Kitna six times, three by Trace Armstrong. Although Seattle jumped out to a 17–10 lead in the 3rd quarter, the Dolphins would rally back behind quarterback Dan Marino, who threw for 196 yards and a touchdown, leading his team to their first road playoff win since 1972 in what ultimately proved to be the final game played at The Kingdome (the Seahawks moved into Husky Stadium for the 2000 season) and the final win of Marino's career.

The Dolphins were the only away team to win in the wild-card round.

=== AFC Divisional Playoffs: at (1) Jacksonville Jaguars ===
AFC Divisional Game: (6) Miami Dolphins at (1) Jacksonville Jaguars

Quarter	1	2	3	4	Total
Dolphins	0	7	0	0	7
Jaguars	24	17	14	7	62

at Alltel Stadium, Jacksonville, Florida

- Game time: 12:30 p.m. EST
- Game weather: 61 °F (16 °C), clear
- Game attendance: 75,173
- Referee: Ed Hochuli
- TV announcers (CBS): Verne Lundquist (play-by-play), Dan Dierdorf (color commentator), and Bonnie Bernstein (sideline reporter)
- Recap, Game Book

Game information

First quarter

- JAX – Jimmy Smith 8-yard pass from Mark Brunell (Mike Hollis kick), 10:32. Jaguars 7–0. Drive: 9 plays, 73 yards, 4:28.
- JAX – Mike Hollis 45-yard field goal, 6:19. Jaguars 10–0. Drive: 9 plays, 14 yards, 3:53.
- JAX – Fred Taylor 90-yard run (Mike Hollis kick), 3:46. Jaguars 17–0. Drive: 2 plays, 91 yards, 0:51.
- JAX – Tony Brackens 16-yard fumble return (Mike Hollis kick), 3:21. Jaguars 24–0.

Second quarter

- JAX – Fred Taylor 39-yard pass from Mark Brunell (Mike Hollis kick) (Mike Hollis kick), 14:48. Jaguars 31–0. Drive: 4 plays, 53 yards, 1:47.
- JAX – James Stewart 25-yard run (Mike Hollis kick), 12:05. Jaguars 38–0. Drive: 3 plays, 21 yards, 1:12.
- JAX – Mike Hollis 28-yard field goal, 1:51. Jaguars 41–0. Drive: 5 plays, 20 yards, 1:26.
- MIA – Oronde Gadsden 20-yard pass from Dan Marino (Olindo Mare kick), 0:01. Jaguars 41–7. Drive: 9 plays, 80 yards, 1:50.

Third quarter

- JAX – Jimmy Smith 70-yard pass from Jay Fiedler (Mike Hollis kick), 12:03. Jaguars 48–7. Drive: 3 plays, 78 yards, 1:19.
- JAX – Alvis Whitted 38-yard pass from Jay Fiedler (Mike Hollis kick), 6:19. Jaguars 55–7. Drive: 5 plays, 69 yards, 2:11.

Fourth quarter

- JAX – Chris Howard 5-yard run (Mike Hollis kick), 10:37. Jaguars 62–7. Drive: 1 play, 5 yards, 0:06.

Top passers

- MIA – Dan Marino – 11/25, 95 yards, TD, 2 INT
- JAX – Jay Fiedler – 7/11, 172 yards, 2 TD, INT

Top rushers

- MIA – Stanley Pritchett – 2 rushes, 10 yards
- JAX – Fred Taylor – 18 rushes, 135 yards, TD

Top receivers

- MIA – Oronde Gadsden – 6 receptions, 62 yards, TD
- JAX – Jimmy Smith – 5 receptions, 136 yards, 2 TD

The Jacksonville Jaguars shredded their in-state rivals the Dolphins with 520 total offensive yards in what became Miami quarterback Dan Marino's last game in the NFL and the most lopsided postseason contest since the Chicago Bears defeated the Redskins 73–0 in the 1940 NFL Championship Game. Their defense forced seven turnovers and held the Dolphins to 131 total yards. Marino was held to just 11 of 25 completions for 95 yards and 1 touchdown, with 2 interceptions and a fumble that was returned for a touchdown in his final game. Marino retired shortly after the season ended.

This was also Jimmy Johnson's final game as an NFL head coach; Johnson resigned the day after the game.
