= Steve White (American football) =

American football player and sports blogger (1973–2022)

No. 94, 95
- Position: Defensive end

Personal information
- Born: October 25, 1973; Memphis, Tennessee, U.S.
- Died: August 30, 2022 (aged 48)
- Listed height: 6 ft 2 in (1.88 m)
- Listed weight: 270 lb (122 kg)

Career information
- High school: Westwood (Memphis)
- College: Tennessee
- NFL draft: 1996: 6th round, 194th overall pick

Career history
- Philadelphia Eagles (1996)*; Tampa Bay Buccaneers (1996–2001); New York Jets (2002); Tampa Bay Storm (2006)
- * Offseason or practice squad member only

Career NFL statistics
- Tackles: 119
- Sacks: 11.5
- Forced fumbles: 3
- Fumble recoveries: 2
- Stats at Pro Football Reference

Stephen Gregory White (October 25, 1973 – August 30, 2022) was an American professional football player who was a defensive end for seven seasons with the Tampa Bay Buccaneers and the New York Jets in the National Football League (NFL). He played college football for the Tennessee Volunteers and was selected by the Philadelphia Eagles in the sixth round of the 1996 NFL draft. He was later a football blogger for SB Nation.

== Playing career ==
White attended Westwood High School in Memphis, Tennessee, and played for the school's football team as a linebacker. He enrolled at the University of Tennessee, where he played college football for the Tennessee Volunteers from 1992 to 1995 as a defensive end. He played in 40 games for the Volunteers, starting 21 games at right defensive end. White recorded 105 tackles, 20 sacks, and forced six fumbles with Tennessee.

The Philadelphia Eagles of the National Football League (NFL) selected White in the sixth round of the 1996 NFL draft with the 194th overall pick. The Eagles wanted White to play as a linebacker and had him lose 20 pounds (9.1 kg). The Eagles cut White before the start of the 1996 NFL season and the Tampa Bay Buccaneers signed him to their practice squad. The Buccaneers signed him as a defensive end and asked him to gain the 20 pounds back.

In October 1996, Tampa Bay signed White to their active roster. He was a backup in his first three seasons. In the 1998 season, an injury to Chidi Ahanotu required White to backup Tyoka Jackson at left defensive end, though he typically had played on the right side. White beat out Regan Upshaw to become a starting defensive end for the Buccaneers in 1999. He started 13 games that season. In the 1999 playoffs, he recorded seven tackles, two sacks, and one forced fumble. White lost his starting job to Marcus Jones the next season, and recorded five sacks as a substitute, alternating with Jones and Simeon Rice. White signed with the New York Jets before the 2002 season. He played as a backup and was waived in February 2003. In his NFL career, White played in 94 games, starting 15 games. He started 13 of those games during the 1999 season. He retired with 119 tackles and 11.5 sacks.

== Later life ==
After his playing career, White was an assistant coach for the University of South Florida for one year. He wrote about the NFL for SB Nation from 2013 to 2020.

White lived in Tampa, Florida, after his career. He was diagnosed with chronic lymphocytic leukemia in 2014 and he received a bone marrow transplant at the Moffitt Cancer Center in April 2022. He died on August 30, 2022, at the age of 48.
