= Cecil Collins (American football) =

American football player (born 1976)

No. 34
- Position: Running back

Personal information
- Born: November 19, 1976 (age 49); Fort Knox, Kentucky, U.S.
- Listed height: 5 ft 10 in (1.78 m)
- Listed weight: 207 lb (94 kg)

Career information
- High school: Leesville (LA)
- College: LSU; McNeese State
- NFL draft: 1999: 5th round, 134th overall pick

Career history
- Miami Dolphins (1999)

Career NFL statistics
- Rushing attempts: 131
- Rushing yards: 414
- Rushing touchdowns: 2
- Receptions: 6
- Receiving yards: 32
- Stats at Pro Football Reference

Cecil J. P. Collins (born November 19, 1976) is an American former professional football player who was a running back for the Miami Dolphins of the National Football League (NFL). He played college football for the LSU Tigers and McNeese State Cowboys.

== Early life ==
Collins attended Leesville High School in Leesville in Vernon Parish in western Louisiana. There, he amassed 99 touchdowns and 7,833 yards over his high school football career including 3,079 yards during his senior season. Leesville was the 4A state runner-up that year and Cecil was selected as Louisiana's very first "Mr. Football".

Collin's struggles began during his senior season at Leesville when the NCAA Clearinghouse declared that he would be required to retake his ACT Test. Cecil had taken the test during his Junior year and had not scored well enough to qualify for Division I schools. At the beginning of his Senior season he retook the exam and improved five points giving him an acceptable score. After reviewing his case however, the NCAA Clearinghouse notified his family that this improvement was unusual and that it would be necessary for him to retest. On his third attempt, Collins failed to make the required score by one point and was forced to sit out his first year at LSU.

== College career ==
After sitting out his freshman year he began his football career at Louisiana State University in less than grand fashion, sitting out the first game of the season serving a suspension for breaking team rules. After this ignoble beginning, however, Collins compiled 596 yards in his first four games before breaking his leg in the game against Vanderbilt.

He was kicked off of the LSU squad before the start of his second season after having been twice arrested for illegally entering dwellings. He claimed he was sleepwalking and had no recollection of entering the girls' rooms. He received probation as his sentence and made a second attempt at college football at Division I-AA (FCS) McNeese State University in Lake Charles, Louisiana but violated his probation when he failed a drug screen and was kicked off of the McNeese squad as well.

== Professional career ==
Collins was selected as the first pick in the fifth round of the 1999 NFL draft by the Dolphins out of McNeese State University by then coach-general manager Jimmy Johnson. Signing a three-year contract, His nickname with the Dolphins was 'Cecil the Diesel'. He appeared in eight games in the 1999 season, accumulating 414 yards and two touchdowns. Collins was suspended indefinitely after his burglary arrest, then released shortly afterward.

=== Career statistics ===
| Year | Team | Games | | Rushing | | | | | Receiving | | | | | Fumbles | |
| Year | Team | GP | GS | Att | Yds | Avg | Lng | TD | Rec | Yds | Avg | Lng | TD | Fum | Lost |
|---|---|---|---|---|---|---|---|---|---|---|---|---|---|---|---|
| 1999 | MIA | 8 | 6 | 131 | 414 | 3.2 | 25 | 2 | 6 | 32 | 5.3 | 12 | 0 | 2 | 1 |
| Total | | 8 | 6 | 131 | 414 | 3.2 | 25 | 2 | 6 | 32 | 5.3 | 12 | 0 | 2 | 1 |

== Burglary case ==
On December 16, 1999, Collins committed burglary in Palm Trace Landings, an apartment complex in Davie, Florida. He admitted that he broke into the home of a married woman that he knew from the gym, but said he only wanted to watch her sleep. After conviction on the charge, he was sentenced to 15 years in prison on March 27, 2001, and released on May 1, 2013.

== Personal life ==
Collins has three children. During his prison sentence, Collins said he found God and married a woman he met while she was visiting another inmate.
