= J. J. Johnson (American football) =

American football player (born 1974)

No. 28, 32
- Positions: Running back, fullback

Personal information
- Born: April 20, 1974 (age 52); Mobile, Alabama, U.S.
- Listed height: 6 ft 1 in (1.85 m)
- Listed weight: 240 lb (109 kg)

Career information
- High school: Davidson (Mobile)
- College: East Mississippi CC; Mississippi State
- NFL draft: 1999: 2nd round, 39th overall pick

Career history
- Miami Dolphins (1999–2001); Cleveland Browns (2002)

Awards and highlights
- First-team All-SEC (1998); Conerly Trophy (1998)

Career NFL statistics
- Rushing attempts: 219
- Rushing yards: 748
- Rushing touchdowns: 5
- Receptions: 29
- Receiving yards: 182
- Stats at Pro Football Reference

James E. "J. J." Johnson (born April 20, 1974) is an American former professional football player who was a running back in the National Football League (NFL). He was selected by the Miami Dolphins in the second round of the 1999 NFL draft. He played college football at East Mississippi Community College before transferring to Mississippi State. While at Mississippi State, Johnson won the Conerly Trophy in 1998. Johnson was also a member of the Cleveland Browns.

== NFL career statistics ==
Pre-draft measurables
Height	Weight	Arm length	Hand span	40-yard dash	10-yard split	20-yard split	20-yard shuttle	Bench press
6 ft 1 3/8 in (1.86 m)	227 lb (103 kg)	31 in (0.79 m)	9 1/8 in (0.23 m)	4.71 s	1.62 s	2.66 s	4.19 s	16 reps
All values from NFL Combine

=== Regular season ===
Year	Team	Games		Rushing							Receiving							Fumbles	
Year	Team	GP	GS	Att	Yds	Avg	Lng	TD	A/G	Y/G	Rec	Yds	Avg	Lng	TD	R/G	Y/G	Fum	Lost
1999	MIA	13	4	164	558	3.4	34	4	12.6	42.9	15	100	6.7	17	0	1.2	7.7	2	2
2000	MIA	13	1	50	168	3.4	16	1	3.8	12.9	10	61	6.1	11	0	0.8	4.7	0	0
2001	MIA	10	0	5	22	4.4	9	0	0.5	2.2	4	21	5.3	7	0	0.4	2.1	0	0
Career		36	5	219	748	3.4	34	5	6.1	20.8	29	182	6.3	17	0	0.8	5.1	2	2

=== Playoffs ===
Year	Team	Games		Rushing							Receiving							Fumbles	
Year	Team	GP	GS	Att	Yds	Avg	Lng	TD	A/G	Y/G	Rec	Yds	Avg	Lng	TD	R/G	Y/G	Fum	Lost
1999	MIA	2	1	35	95	2.7	18	1	17.5	47.5	4	14	3.5	7	0	2.0	7.0	1	1
2000	MIA	2	0	3	12	4.0	5	0	6.0	1.5	3	25	8.3	11	0	1.5	12.5	0	0
Career		4	1	38	107	2.8	18	1	7.6	21.4	7	39	1.4	11	0	1.4	7.8	1	1
