= D. J. Johnson (cornerback, born 1966) =

American football player (born 1966)

D.J. Johnson
No. 44
- Position: Cornerback

Personal information
- Born: July 14, 1966 (age 60); Louisville, Kentucky, U.S.
- Listed height: 6 ft 0 in (1.83 m)
- Listed weight: 187 lb (85 kg)

Career information
- High school: Male (Louisville)
- College: Kentucky
- NFL draft: 1989: 7th round, 174th overall pick

Career history
- Pittsburgh Steelers (1989–1993); Atlanta Falcons (1994–1996); Arizona Cardinals (1996)

Career NFL statistics
- Tackles: 428
- Interceptions: 19
- Fumble recoveries: 5
- Stats at Pro Football Reference

David Allen "D.J." Johnson (born July 14, 1966) is an American former professional football player who was a cornerback for eight seasons in the National Football League (NFL), mainly for the Pittsburgh Steelers. He played college football for the Kentucky Wildcats. He entered broadcasting after his retirement as a player.

== Professional career ==
After attending the University of Kentucky, Johnson was selected by the Pittsburgh Steelers in the seventh round of the 1989 NFL Draft. He played for the Pittsburgh Steelers (1989–1993), Atlanta Falcons (1994–1996) and Arizona Cardinals (1996). He finished his career with 19 interceptions in 117 games.

== Personal life ==
After retiring, he worked as a sideline reporter with Pat Summerall and John Madden as the lead crew. He worked the NFC Championship Games in 1999 and 2000. He became a broadcaster for The NFL on FOX in 2001 with Scott Graham.

He is also an actor, appearing as a Klingon in the Star Trek: Enterprise episode "Judgement".
