= Oronde Gadsden =

American football player (born 1971)

No. 88, 86
- Position: Wide receiver

Personal information
- Born: August 20, 1971 (age 55); Charleston, South Carolina, U.S.
- Listed height: 6 ft 2 in (1.88 m)
- Listed weight: 215 lb (98 kg)

Career information
- High school: Burke (Charleston)
- College: Winston-Salem State
- NFL draft: 1995: undrafted

Career history
- Dallas Cowboys (1995); Frankfurt Galaxy (1997)*; Pittsburgh Steelers (1997)*; Dallas Cowboys (1997)*; Portland Forest Dragons (1998); Miami Dolphins (1998–2003)
- * Offseason or practice squad member only

Awards and highlights
- Super Bowl champion (XXX); AFL Rookie of the Year (1998); AFL All-Rookie Team (1998); All-CIAA (1994)

Career NFL statistics
- Receptions: 227
- Receiving yards: 3,252
- Receiving touchdowns: 22
- Stats at Pro Football Reference

Career AFL statistics
- Receptions: 93
- Receiving yards: 1,335
- Receiving touchdowns: 37
- Interceptions: 3
- Stats at ArenaFan.com

Oronde Benjamin Gadsden (/oʊˈrɒndeɪ/ oh-RON-day) (born August 20, 1971) is an American former professional football player who was a wide receiver in the National Football League (NFL) for the Dallas Cowboys and Miami Dolphins. He also was a member of the Frankfurt Galaxy of the World League of American Football (WLAF) and the Portland Forest Dragons of the Arena Football League (AFL). He played college football for the Winston-Salem State Rams.

== Early life ==
Gadsden attended Burke High School, where he practiced basketball and football. He accepted a basketball scholarship from Winston-Salem State University. Although he spent his first year as a basketball player, he decided to concentrate on football as a sophomore, posting 31 receptions for 810 yards (26.1-yard average) and 13 touchdowns.

As a junior, Gadsden had 31 receptions for 836 yards (27-yard average) and 14 touchdowns. In his last year of eligibility, he had 56 receptions, led the Central Intercollegiate Athletic Association with a 19.8-yard average per reception and ranked second in yards per game (101), total receiving yards (1,111 yards) and touchdowns (16).

After playing three seasons of football, Gadsden finished his college career with 118 receptions for 2,757 yards (23.4 yards per catch) and 42 touchdowns (second in school history).

In 2006, Gadsden was inducted into the Winston-Salem State University Athletic Hall of Fame.

== Professional career ==
=== Dallas Cowboys ===
After not being selected in the 1995 NFL draft because of his small school background and his lack of speed, Gadsden was signed as an undrafted free agent by the Dallas Cowboys. On August 22, he was waived and signed to the team's practice squad on August 30. Gadsden credits hall of famer Michael Irvin for teaching him how to play the wide receiver position.

On January 8, 1996, Gadsden was promoted to the active roster to participate in the NFC Championship game, but he suffered a severely sprained left ankle and was placed on the injured reserve list three days later, with the Cowboys ultimately winning Super Bowl XXX. He fractured an orbital bone below his right eye and was waived injured before the start of the 1996 regular season.

=== Pittsburgh Steelers ===
On February 4, 1997, Gadsden was signed by the Pittsburgh Steelers as a free agent, joining fellow Winston-Salem alumn Yancey Thigpen. He was cut on August 19.

=== Frankfurt Galaxy ===
The Frankfurt Galaxy of the World League of American Football signed Gadsden for their 1997 roster, but he separated his shoulder during the tryout camp in Atlanta and did not play during the season.

=== Portland Forest Dragons ===
Gadsden signed with the Portland Forest Dragons in 1998, where he played as a wide receiver and linebacker. He earned AFL Rookie of the Year honors after registering 93 receptions for 1,335 yards and 37 touchdowns in 14 games.

=== Miami Dolphins ===
In 1998, the Miami Dolphins were having problems finding a capable complement to O. J. McDuffie and signed Gadsden to compete for the position. He entered the season as a 27-year-old rookie and his first NFL reception was a 44-yard touchdown on opening day against the Indianapolis Colts. Gadsden ended up starting 12 games, finishing with 48 receptions, 713 yards (second on the team) and seven receiving touchdowns (tied for first on the team).

In 1999, Gadsden registered 48 receptions (second on the team), a career-high 803 yards and six receiving touchdowns (which led the team). In 2000, after Dan Marino retired, he had a career-high 56 receptions for 786 yards and six receiving touchdowns (led the team). After the 2001 season, health problems limited Gadsden's production to a combined 20 receptions, with no touchdowns. He was waived injured on September 5, 2003, leaving the Dolphins after starting all but six of the games he played and ranking in the top 10 of the franchise's all-time receiver list.

Gadsden's two most famous catches came against the New York Jets on an across-the-middle one-handed catch from Jay Fiedler, and in the 2001 playoffs against the Oakland Raiders, in which Gadsden reached up and caught the pass one-handed in full stride while falling backwards. Photographs of both catches are displayed in the Pro Football Hall of Fame and were nominated for ESPYs.

Gadsden has the distinction of catching Marino's last touchdown pass.

=== NFL statistics ===
Year	Team	Games	Recs	Yards	Avg	Long	TDs	FDs	Fums	Lost
1998	MIA	16	48	713	14.9	50	7	34	2	2
1999	MIA	16	48	803	16.7	62	6	37	0	0
2000	MIA	16	56	786	14.0	61	6	36	0	0
2001	MIA	14	55	674	12.3	61	3	34	1	1
2002	MIA	6	16	228	14.3	29	0	14	0	0
2003	MIA	6	4	48	12.0	23	0	4	0	0
Career		74	227	3,252	14.3	62	22	159	3	3

== Personal life ==
Gadsden runs the clothing company Original Gear, which he started in 2000 while he still was an NFL player. The company went public in 2006 under the name TotalLuxuryGroup. He is also involved with his charity, NextLevel Charities, which enables underprivileged and disadvantaged youths to achieve success in athletics and academics. He was a minority owner of the Miami Morays of the National Indoor Football League. His son, Oronde Gadsden II, is a tight end for the Los Angeles Chargers.
