= O. J. McDuffie =

American football player (born 1969)

O.J. McDuffie
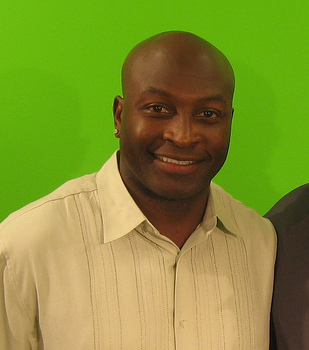
- McDuffie in 2008

No. 81
- Position: Wide receiver

Personal information
- Born: December 2, 1969 (age 56); Marion, Ohio, U.S.
- Listed height: 5 ft 10 in (1.78 m)
- Listed weight: 195 lb (88 kg)

Career information
- High school: Hawken School (Gates Mills, Ohio)
- College: Penn State
- NFL draft: 1993: 1st round, 25th overall pick

Career history
- Miami Dolphins (1993–2001)

Awards and highlights
- NFL receptions leader (1998); Dolphins Walk of Fame (2013); Paul Warfield Trophy (1992); Consensus All-American (1992); First-team All-East (1991); Fiesta Bowl MVP (1992)

Career NFL statistics
- Receptions: 415
- Receiving yards: 5,074
- Receiving touchdowns: 29
- Kick return yards: 2,103
- Return touchdowns: 2
- Stats at Pro Football Reference

Otis James McDuffie (born December 2, 1969) is an American former professional football player who was a wide receiver for eight seasons with the Miami Dolphins of the National Football League (NFL). He played college football for the Penn State Nittany Lions, earning All-American honors. A first-round pick in the 1993 NFL draft, McDuffie played professionally for the Dolphins.

== Early life ==
McDuffie was born in Marion, Ohio. He attended Hawken School in Gates Mills, Ohio, excelling in football, basketball, track and field and baseball. He set Hawken's record for all-purpose yards with 7,302 in his high school career. In 1986, McDuffie returned an interception 108 yards, an unofficial Ohio state record. During his senior year in 1987, he was named the A-AA Ohio Player of the year. For the 1987 high school football season, he scored 136 points (21 touchdowns) ahead of future professional football players Desmond Howard and Robert Smith.

His number 32 is retired at Hawken School and The News-Herald named McDuffie the number 3 player of the 20th century in Northeast Ohio. Memorabilia from McDuffie's days playing Marion Midget Football are featured in an exhibit entitled "A Passion to Play" at the Marion County Historical Society.

== College career ==
McDuffie attended Pennsylvania State University, and played for coach Joe Paterno's Penn State Nittany Lions football team. He wore the number 24 for the Nittany Lions. He set several single-season and career receiving records, as well as all-purpose yards records. His performance in Penn State's 1992 Fiesta Bowl victory over Tennessee on January 1, 1992, garnered him the game's offensive MVP.

McDuffie also played one season of varsity baseball in 1990 while at Penn State. He still holds the PSU record for stolen bases in a single game with 4, and is in the top 10 for stolen bases in a single season. McDuffie was drafted by the then California Angels in the 41st round of the 1991 Major League Baseball draft but did not sign.

He earned a Bachelor of Science degree in labor and industrial relations from Penn State in 1992.

== Professional career ==
McDuffie poses for a photo during the Dolphin's 1999 training camp with Miami-Dade County Mayor Alex Penelas and Dolphins coach Jimmy Johnson

The Miami Dolphins selected McDuffie in the first round (25th pick overall) of the 1993 NFL draft. He returned punts and was a reserve wide receiver before earning the starting spot for the Dolphins. During his formative years with the Dolphins, McDuffie became known as Dan Marino's favorite receiver. His 415 career catches are fourth all-time in Dolphins history. In 1998, McDuffie caught 90 passes, leading the NFL in that category. He was the first Dolphin to achieve this mark (since achieved by Jarvis Landry in 2017). That same year, McDuffie became the first player in NFL history to record at least 90 receptions and 10 punt returns in a season without a fumble. Antonio Brown of Pittsburgh in 2016 is the only player to do it since. With the exception of Mark Clayton and Mark Duper, McDuffie caught more passes thrown by Marino than any other Dolphin receiver. He played his entire career in Miami, retiring in 2000 because of a nagging toe injury.

Nearly ten years later, McDuffie would win a Medical malpractice lawsuit related to that career-ending toe injury. On May 5, 2010, Miami-Dade County, Florida jurors ordered a former Dolphins team physician, Dr. John Uribe, to pay McDuffie $11.5 million in damages. The lawsuit alleged Uribe told McDuffie he was safe to continue playing football, despite MRIs showing damage to the tendons in his toe. On September 30, 2010, Judge Michael Genden of Miami-Dade County tossed out that verdict due to the improper use of a medical manual as evidence. The judge also ordered a new trial. A second trial resulted in a verdict for Dr. Uribe. On appeal by McDuffie, the Third District Court affirmed the judgment for Dr. Uribe.

== NFL career statistics ==
Year	Team	GP	Receiving						Punt return					Kick return					Fumbles	
Year	Team	GP	Rec	Yds	Avg	Lng	TD	FD	Ret	Yds	Lng	TD	FC	Ret	Yds	Lng	TD	FC	Fum	Lost
1993	MIA	16	19	197	10.4	18	0	16	28	317	72	2	22	32	755	48	0	0	0	0
1994	MIA	15	37	488	13.2	30	3	28	32	228	26	0	15	36	767	46	0	0	0	0
1995	MIA	16	62	819	13.2	48	8	50	24	163	24	0	12	23	564	47	0	0	2	1
1996	MIA	16	74	918	12.4	36	8	50	22	212	19	0	24	0	0	0	0	0	3	1
1997	MIA	16	76	943	12.4	55	1	50	2	4	3	0	1	0	0	0	0	0	0	0
1998	MIA	16	90	1,050	11.7	61	7	59	12	141	39	0	8	0	0	0	0	0	0	0
1999	MIA	12	43	516	12.0	34	2	30	7	62	21	0	8	1	17	17	0	0	1	1
2000	MIA	9	14	143	10.2	24	0	9	0	0	0	0	1	0	0	0	0	0	0	0
Career		116	415	5,074	12.2	61	29	292	127	1,127	72	2	91	92	2,103	48	0	0	6	3

== Life after football ==
McDuffie hosts a weekly podcast, The Fish Tank: Dolphins Tales From The Deep, as part of the Miami Dolphins Podcast Network.

McDuffie was formerly a radio personality for WAXY, an AM sports radio station in South Florida and is now a sports blogger at OPENSports.com. He is also the founder and chairman of the Catch 81 Foundation, an organization created to raise money for children's charitable causes in the South Florida metropolitan area.

He was inducted into the Dolphins Walk of Fame on December 29, 2013.

In 2014, he was inducted into the Hawken School Athletic Hall of Fame.

In 2025, he was the keynote speaker at the Friendly Sons of Saint Patrick annual dinner in Pittston, Pennsylvania.
