= Stanley Pritchett =

American football player (born 1973)

No. 36, 46
- Position: Fullback

Personal information
- Born: December 22, 1973 (age 52); Atlanta, Georgia, U.S.
- Listed height: 6 ft 2 in (1.88 m)
- Listed weight: 250 lb (113 kg)

Career information
- High school: Douglass (Atlanta)
- College: South Carolina
- NFL draft: 1996: 4th round, 118th overall pick

Career history
- Miami Dolphins (1996–1999); Philadelphia Eagles (2000); Chicago Bears (2001–2003); Atlanta Falcons (2004)

Career NFL statistics
- Rushing yards: 549
- Rushing average: 3.7
- Receptions: 162
- Receiving yards: 1,244
- Total touchdowns: 13
- Stats at Pro Football Reference

Stanley Jerome Pritchett (born December 22, 1973) is an American former professional football player who was a fullback for nine seasons in the National Football League (NFL) from 1996 to 2004. He played college football for the South Carolina Gamecocks and was selected by the Miami Dolphins in the fourth round of the 1996 NFL draft with the 118th overall pick. He played in the NFL for the Dolphins, Philadelphia Eagles, Chicago Bears and Atlanta Falcons. Pritchett is a member of Kappa Alpha Psi fraternity. Pritchett, whose father, Dr. Stanley Pritchett, is the acting president at Morris Brown College, and is a high school professor and a head football coach at Douglass High School .
