= West Broward High School =

Public school in Pembroke Pines, Florida

Location
- 500 NW 209th Ave; Pembroke Pines, Florida 33029; United States; 26.011539°N 80.429645°W

Information
- Type: Public
- Established: August 20, 2008
- School district: Broward County Public Schools
- NCES District ID: 1200180
- Superintendent: Dr. Howard Hepburn
- CEEB code: 102181
- NCES School ID: 120018007555
- Principal: Parinaz Bristol
- Faculty: 104.53 (FTE)
- Grades: 9–12
- Enrollment: 2,586 (2022–23)
- Student to teacher ratio: 24.74
- Campus type: Suburb
- Colors: Carolina Blue, Silver and Black
- Mascot: Bobcat
- Newspaper: The Lynx
- Feeder schools: Silver Trail Middle School
- Website: westbroward.browardschools.com

West Broward High School is a public secondary school located in Pembroke Pines, Florida, United States, serving students in grades 9 through 12. The school is a part of the Broward County Public Schools district.

West Broward High has an FCAT school grade of "A" for the 2009–2010 academic year.

== Overview ==
The school's first day of classes was scheduled for August 18, 2008, but the opening was delayed for two days due to Tropical Storm Fay.

The school was constructed to relieve overcrowding at nearby schools such as Everglades High School, Cypress Bay High School, Charles W. Flanagan High School, and Cooper City High School. Daniel Traeger was named the school's first ever principal on November 15, 2007. The school's mascot are the Bobcats and the school colors are Carolina blue and silver. The school is notable for its ProStart Culinary Program, Performance Ensemble, Veterinary Medicine career program, and daycare program for teachers assistants, as well as its nationally recognized Television Production Program.

The school newspaper is called The Lynx. West Broward's TV Production program has won an array of awards at FSPA at the district and state levels, as well as at the national level as of the 2013–2014 school year.

West Broward High feeds 100% from Silver Trail Middle, portions of Glades Middle, portions of Falcon Cove Middle, portions of Somerset Academy Chapel Trail Middle School, and portions of Franklin Academy Pembroke Pines and Cooper City.

== Attendance zone ==
The school serves sections of Pembroke Pines, Davie, and Southwest Ranches.

Some areas are jointly zoned to West Broward High and Cooper City High School, including sections of Cooper City and Southwest Ranches.

== Career and Technical Programs (CTACE) ==
West Broward High School offers a number of various career and technical programs such as:

- Television Production
- Veterinary Assisting
- The Institute of Business and Entrepreneurship (IBE)
- Web Design Services
- Academy of Culinary Operations (ProStart) / Hospitality
- Early Childhood Education
- First Responder / Allied Health Assisting
- DECA (Association of Business Students)
- Pathways to Engineering

== Science Department offerings ==
- Biology 1
- Biology 1 H
- Biology 2 H (10th–11th)
- AP Biology
- Chemistry 1
- Chemistry 1H
- AP Chemistry
- Physics 1
- Physics H
- AP Environmental Science
- AICE Marine Science
- Anatomy & Physiology H
- Environmental Science
- AICE Environmental Science

These are not magnet programs and are offered to all students of West Broward High School.

== Performance Ensemble ==
West Broward High has an award-winning Performance Ensemble which consists of wind players, percussion, and color guard. In November 2010, they performed at Tropicana Field in St. Petersburg, FL for their first competition on a state level and placed 3rd in class 5A in competition with over 80 other bands. In October 2011, they performed at the Georgia Dome in Atlanta, GA in the Bands of America Super Regional Competition for the first time. They made finals, making them the 2nd band in the history of BOA to make finals for the first time, and they took 9th place. In November 2017, West Broward finished 1st overall in class 4A at the state championship, earning their first ever class title. They would outdo that achievement two years later, in November 2019, when they performed at Daytona Stadium and won their first ever state championship, finishing 1st in class 5A and earning the overall highest score.

Their color guard ranked third in Class A at World Finals during the 2009–2010 "Winter Guard" season. During the 2010–2011 season the winterguard placed 2nd in Open class. The 2011–2012 year started their journey through world class finishing 9th in world class finals. In the 2012–2013 season, they placed 4th in world class finals, their highest placement yet. The 2018–2019 World Guard would tie that placement, finishing 4th in world class finals that year.

== Demographics ==
As of the 2021–22 school year, the total student enrollment was 2,589. The ethnic makeup of the school was 75.9% White, 14.4% Black, 57.7% Hispanic, 5.5% Asian, 3.5% Multiracial, 0.7% Native American or Native Alaskan, and 0.1% Native Hawaiian or Pacific Islander.

== Notable alumni ==
- Omar Raja, founder of House of Highlights
- Skatune Network
