= Cooper City High School =

Public school in Florida, United States

Coordinates: 26.045645°N 80.2728272°W

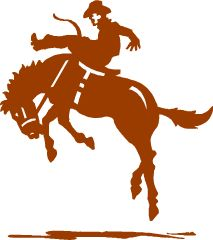

Location
- 9401 Stirling Road; Cooper City, Florida 33328; United States

Information
- School type: Public High School (Secondary) 9th, 10th, 11th, and 12th Grade Consistently rated an A school and one of the top ranked High Schools in Broward.
- Motto: "Home of the Cowboys"
- Established: September 1971
- School district: Broward County Public Schools
- Superintendent: Howard Hepburn
- Principal: Sean Curran
- Staff: 94.00 (FTE)
- Grades: 9–12
- Enrollment: 2,379(2025-2026) (School Year 2025-2026; This school is usually maintained just below 2,400 students.)
- Student to teacher ratio: 24.54
- Campus: Suburban Area and Surroundings: Located on Stirling Road between Palm Avenue and SW 90th Avenue. Directly across the street is a strip mall complex with very popular business'. A favorite is "Jeremiah's", an ice cream shop. The school campus has BCPS Security Staff posted in various locations. Cooper City Emergency Services stations (serviced by BSO) Fire-Rescue and Sheriff's sub-station are both located within 2 miles or less, making response time to the scene a plus. In addition, there are two BSO (Broward Sheriff's Office) Deputies permanently assigned to the campus.
- Colors: Red; Black; White
- Mascot: Pistol Pete (formerly Lasso Larry)
- Nickname: Cowboys
- Website: coopercityhigh.browardschools.com

Cooper City High School, also referred to as CCHS, is a high school located in Cooper City, Florida, which teaches grades 9–12. The school includes standard high school curriculum plus specialized classes devoted to career development.

It has an average enrollment of approximately 2,400 students. Currently, for the 2025-2026 school year, Sean Curran is the principal. The school colors are red, black, and white and the mascot is a cowboy named "Pistol Pete." The school has been awarded the Blue Ribbon School of Excellence award. Cooper City has an FLDOE school grade of "A" for the 2018–2019 academic year. The school was also ranked #382 in the High School Challenge Index of 2011 out of approximately 30,000 schools. It is the 88th best school in the state of Florida out of 762 schools as reported by U.S. News & World Report.

== Facilities ==
Classes were first held in 1971 behind city hall on SW 90th Avenue. The original buildings on Stirling Road were completed in time for the 1972 school year. Over time, Building 1, the main academic building, started to deteriorate with roof leaks, inefficient air conditioning units and water intrusion. A new 36-classroom building opened during the 2007–2008 school year. This building was followed by a new cafeteria which opened in May during the 2009–2010 school year. An entirely new building to replace Building 1 started construction during the 2012–2013 school year and opened in November of the 2013–2014 school year, complete with new general purpose classrooms, a science wing, a new childcare building, business labs, an automotive facility, and new offices. Building 1 was demolished and was now two grass fields, one of which was used for student parking.

== Attendance zone ==
Cooper City High served Cooper City and parts of Davie.

Some areas were jointly zoned to Cooper City High and West Broward High School, including sections of Cooper City and Southwest Ranches. Students in these areas might choose which school to attend.

== Academics ==
The AP participation rate was 61%. Each AP class awarded six points for an A, five points for a B, four points for a C, one point for a D, or zero points for an F to the student's weighted GPA per quarter.

Cooper City High School offered the following AP courses as of the 2021–2022 school year.

- Biology
- Calculus (AB & BC)
- Capstone Research
- Capstone Seminar
- Chemistry
- Computer Science A
- Computer Science Principles
- English Language & Composition
- English Literature & Composition
- Human Geography
- Physics 1
- Psychology
- Spanish Language & Culture
- Spanish Literature
- Statistics
- Studio Art: Drawing 2D
- U.S. Government
- U.S. History
- World History

In addition, students were eligible to dual-enroll in courses at Broward College or the University of Florida. Dual-enrollment courses could be taken over the summer break or during the school year. Sophomores, juniors and seniors were eligible to use dual-enrollment courses to replace the fourth and/or eighth period slots in their class schedules, however sophomores were not allowed to leave campus early.

== Athletics ==
The boy's water polo team won state championship in 1985, 1986, and 1992. The softball team had won district, regional, and in 2009, state. In the 2010 football season, Cooper City won district for the first time. Cooper City Football won district for a second time in 2011, beating the former national champion, St. Thomas Aquinas, for the first time since 1972 in a 21–16 victory. The boys' tennis team was a 3-time FHSAA State Qualifier (1986, 1987 and 1988) winning the overall FHSAA 4A State Tennis Team Championships in 1988 and with it, the school's first ever sanctioned state team championship. As of the 2020–2021 school year the sports offered at the school were:

- Baseball
- Basketball (Boys' and Girls')
- Cheerleading
- Cross Country
- Flag Football (Girls)
- Football
- Golf (Boys and Girls)
- Lacrosse (Boys and Girls)
- Soccer (Boys' and Girls')
- Softball
- Swimming/Diving (Boys and Girls)
- Tennis (Boys and Girls) FHSAA 4A Boys' Team Champions - 1988
- Track (Boys and Girls)
- Volleyball (Boys and Girls)
- Water Polo (Boys and Girls)
- Wrestling

== CTV News ==
Cowboy Television (typically shortened to CTV) is the school's news magazine and variety show. It was developed in 1997 by the school's television and mass media class. At that time, the show aired on a monthly schedule. The show aired every Friday via an internal broadcasting system. Considered to be "America's #1 High School Weekly News Program" by the Student Television Network, the CTV program has been the recipient of various awards.

== Sound of Pride ==
The marching band, known as the Sound of Pride, attended various competitions, parades, and community events. In recent years, the program had prepared two field shows: one with simpler drill, more popular music, and sometimes dancing for the football game crowd as well as a competition or "comp" show, which had complicated drill with music and movements that help to convey the theme being portrayed by the performers (otherwise known as a "corps-style" show).

The program had marched in several parades, some of which include: 1991 when the band marched in the Channel 6 Philadelphia Thanksgiving Day Parade, 1992 when the band marched in the 58th annual King Orange Jamboree Parade, 1997 when the band first went to the London New Year's Day Parade, and 2015 when the band marched in the Davie Orange Blossom Parade. In 2016, the band participated in the Allstate Sugar Bowl band competition, parade, and halftime show in New Orleans. They won the competition, sweeping all captions.. The ensemble became FMBC Class 4A State Champions in 2008. In 2009 the wind ensemble attended the Music For All/Bands of America National Concert Festival.

On June 9, 2022, the band performed the school's fight song one last time during the early dismissal. The band formed "1971–2022" during the early dismissal.

== Demographics ==
As of the 2021–22 school year, the total enrollment was 2,347. The ethnic makeup of the school was 82.1% White, 7.3% Black, 36.6% Hispanic, 6.7% Asian, 0.2% Pacific Islander, 3.2% Multiracial, and 0.6% Native American or Native Alaskan.

== Notable alumni ==
- Mark Chung, American former professional soccer player for the Kansas City Wizards, MetroStars, Colorado Rapids, and the San Jose Earthquakes
- Bobby Estalella, American former professional baseball catcher for the Philadelphia Phillies, San Francisco Giants, New York Yankees, Colorado Rockies, Arizona Diamondbacks, and the Toronto Blue Jays
- Olindo Mare, American former professional football placekicker for the New York Giants, Miami Dolphins, New Orleans Saints, Seattle Seahawks, Carolina Panthers, and the Chicago Bears
- Moshe Reuven, 30 Under 30 Tech Exec and signed Billboard Charting Hip Hop Artist
- Aseem Shukla, surgeon and Hindu religious advocate
- Krissy Taylor, model
- Niki Taylor, model
- Rashad Weaver, American football linebacker for the Tennessee Titans
