= Rashad Weaver =

American football player (born 1997)

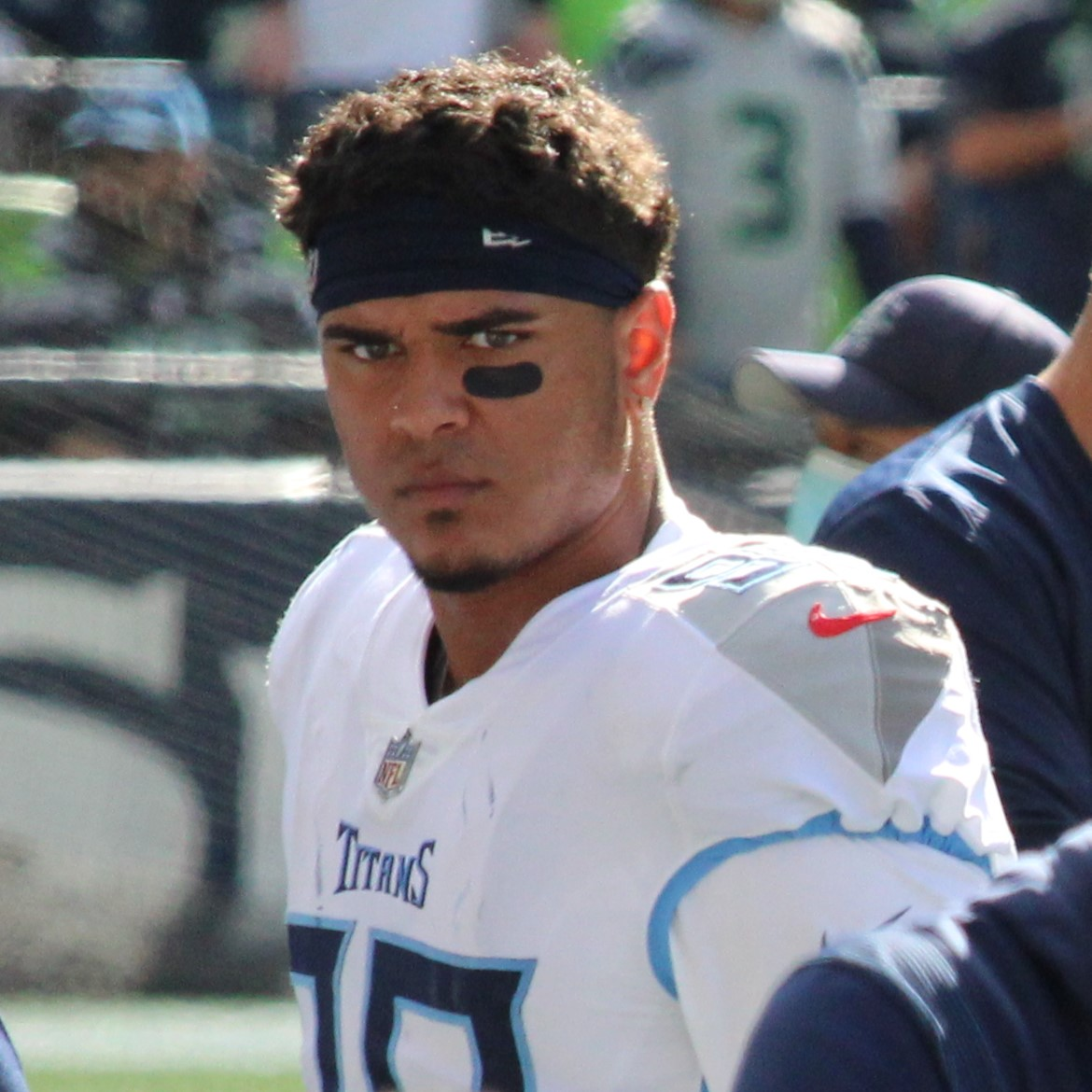
- Weaver with the Tennessee Titans in 2021

Profile
- Position: Outside linebacker

Personal information
- Born: November 10, 1997 (age 28); Marion, Indiana, U.S.
- Listed height: 6 ft 4 in (1.93 m)
- Listed weight: 259 lb (117 kg)

Career information
- High school: Cooper City (Cooper City, Florida)
- College: Pittsburgh (2016–2020)
- NFL draft: 2021: 4th round, 135th overall pick

Career history
- Tennessee Titans (2021–2023); Houston Texans (2024); Los Angeles Rams (2024)*; New York Jets (2025)*; Los Angeles Chargers (2025)*
- * Offseason or practice squad member only

Awards and highlights
- Consensus All-American (2020); First-team All-ACC (2020)

Career NFL statistics as of 2024
- Tackles: 49
- Sacks: 5.5
- Pass deflections: 7
- Forced fumbles: 2
- Fumble recoveries: 1
- Stats at Pro Football Reference

Rashad Capone Weaver (born November 10, 1997) is an American professional football linebacker. He played college football for the Pittsburgh Panthers.

== Early life ==
Weaver was one of three children born to Autumn DeLaPorte and Nevin Weaver. He has two sisters. Weaver attended Cooper City High School in Cooper City, Florida. He played defensive end and tight end in high school. He originally committed to the University of Michigan to play college football but changed his commitment to the University of Pittsburgh.

== College career ==
After redshirting his first year at Pittsburgh in 2016, Weaver played in 12 games and made five starts in 2017. He finished the season with 28 tackles and three sacks. He started all 14 games in 2018, recording 47 tackles and leading the team with 6.5 sacks. Weaver missed the 2019 season after tearing his ACL. He returned from the injury for his senior season in 2020. While at Pittsburgh, Weaver earned a bachelor's degree with a dual major in Business Information Systems (BBIS) and finance. He went on to attend Pittsburgh's Graduate School of Business.

== Professional career ==
Pre-draft measurables
Height	Weight	Arm length	Hand span	40-yard dash	10-yard split	20-yard split	20-yard shuttle	Three-cone drill	Vertical jump	Broad jump	Bench press
6 ft 4 3/8 in (1.94 m)	259 lb (117 kg)	33 1/2 in (0.85 m)	9 3/4 in (0.25 m)	4.88 s	1.57 s	2.88 s	4.26 s	6.97 s	32.0 in (0.81 m)	9 ft 6 in (2.90 m)	20 reps
All values from Pro Day

=== Tennessee Titans ===
Weaver was selected by the Tennessee Titans in the fourth round, 135th overall, of the 2021 NFL draft. He signed his four-year rookie contract with Tennessee on June 10, 2021. He was placed on injured reserve on September 28, 2021.

Weaver was waived by the Titans on August 28, 2024.

=== Houston Texans ===
On September 2, 2024, Weaver was signed to the Houston Texans practice squad. He was promoted to the active roster on September 11. He was released on November 20.

=== Los Angeles Rams ===
On December 17, 2024, Weaver was signed to the Los Angeles Rams practice squad.

=== New York Jets ===
On March 17, 2025, Weaver signed with the New York Jets. He was placed on injured reserve on August 21, and released four days later.

=== Los Angeles Chargers ===
On September 18, 2025, Weaver signed with the Los Angeles Chargers practice squad. He was released on September 30.
