= Conroy Black =

American football player (born 1988)

No. 32
- Position: Cornerback

Personal information
- Born: October 31, 1988 (age 38); Broward County, Florida
- Listed height: 6 ft 0 in (1.83 m)
- Listed weight: 187 lb (85 kg)

Career information
- High school: Miramar (FL) Everglades and Pembroke Pines (FL) Flanagan
- College: Fullerton (2007–2008); Utah (2009–2011)
- NFL draft: 2012: undrafted

Career history
- Oakland Raiders (2012)*; Detroit Lions (2012–2013)*; Kansas City Chiefs (2013)*; Detroit Lions (2013)*; Los Angeles Kiss (2013); Avant garde academy PE COACH
- * Offseason or practice squad member only
- Stats at Pro Football Reference

Conroy Black (born October 31, 1988) is a current NFL Free Agent. Black played college football for the Utah Utes. Black was undrafted in the 2012 NFL draft.

== Professional career ==
=== Oakland Raiders ===
After going unpicked in the 2012 NFL draft, Black signed a free agent contract with the Oakland Raiders on May 11, 2012. He was waived on August 29, 2012.

=== Detroit Lions ===
On September 18, 2012, Black was signed to the Detroit Lions practice squad, where he spent all of the 2012 season.

Black signed a futures contract with the Detroit Lions on January 1, 2013. Black was released by the Detroit Lions on May 16, 2013.

=== Kansas City Chiefs ===
On July 26, 2013, Black signed with the Kansas City Chiefs. On August 6, 2013, he was waived by the Chiefs.

=== Detroit Lions ===
On August 13, 2013, Black was signed by the Detroit Lions. On August 16, 2013, he was released by the Lions.

=== Los Angeles Kiss ===
Black signed with the Los Angeles Kiss on February 3, 2014. He was placed on reassignment on March 28, 2014. He later attended rookie mini-camp with the Carolina Panthers, but was not signed.
