= Broward Correctional Institution =

Prison in Florida, United States

Coordinates: 26°02′00″N 80°25′10″W

The Broward Correctional Institution (BCI) was a correctional facility located in the former Country Estates CDP, and later in Southwest Ranches, Florida, operated by the Florida Department of Corrections. The Region IV Correctional Facility Office was located on the grounds of Broward Correctional Institution. The prison was in proximity to Pembroke Pines. It was located along Sheridan Street, near U.S. Route 27.

The facility was opened in 1977 to house a male inmate population. However, in its history the prison has had only female inmates.

The Town of Southwest Ranches started operations in June 2000, and the prison became a part of the municipality.

It housed female death row inmates until February 2003 when the female death row was moved to Lowell Annex. The Broward Correctional Institution served as a reception center for female inmates. As of 2011, a staff of approximately 272 individuals serviced the facility. As of 2012 624 prisoners, all female, were housed there. The facility was closed in 2012. Closure was scheduled for May 1 of that year. The Fort Lauderdale Sun-Sentinel said "BCI was determined to have a relatively low population and a high per diem inmate cost of $111.48." ($155.82 when adjusted for inflation)

== Notable inmates ==
Death row:

- Judy Buenoano
- Aileen Wuornos
