= Rick Shaw (radio) =

American radio personality (died 2017)

- Born: James Harold Hummel; October 24, 1938; St. Louis, Missouri, U.S.
- Died: September 22, 2017 (aged 78); Cooper City, Florida, U.S.
- Occupation: Radio/television personality
- Years active: 1956–2007
- Spouse: Elaine Hummel (m. 1973; died 2001)
- Children: 2

Rick Shaw (born James Harold Hummel; October 24, 1938 – September 22, 2017) was an American disc jockey, radio and television personality, who remains best known for hosting his radio shows on WQAM (1963–1975), WAXY (1975–1990), and Majic (1990–2007).

== Early life ==
Shaw was born and raised in St. Louis, Missouri.

== Radio and television career ==
He started in radio as a high school senior. In 1956, he got his first job in St. Louis. He followed that with gigs in Omaha, Denver and then WCKR in Miami in 1960, when he got his professional name as Rick Shaw, and where he spent most of his career spinning vinyl and playing oldies, goldies, and Rock and Roll.

=== Radio career ===
By 1963, he was working at WQAM doing a daily 7pm-11pm shift, when in 1964, he recorded a record-shattering 54 share — more than all the other local stations combined.

In 1964, at WQAM, Shaw was the first radio disc jockey in South Florida to play The Beatles songs. He met them later that year in Jacksonville.

During a 47-year career in Miami, Shaw finished each program with the 1959 Ray Peterson classic, Goodnight My Love.

When FM stations began to overtake AM stations, WAXY-FM 106, later known as WAXY 105.9 and WBGG 105.9, hired him as program director. His last on-air job before retiring in 2007 was at WMXJ-FM "Majic 102.7". He remained involved with the Majic Children's Fund.

On May 11, 2007, Shaw surprised listeners by announcing his retirement midway through a broadcast. When the show ended, he played the Peterson classic, "Goodnight My Love".

=== Television programs ===
He hosted two television shows, "Saturday Hop" and "The Rick Shaw Show," both on Channel 10 (WLBW).

In the 1970's and early 1980s, he was a commercial spokesman in national campaigns for products such as NuVinyl furniture cleaner and NuFinish car wax. He also was president of the Majic 102.7 Children's Fund.

== Personal life ==
Shaw spent his retirement doing charity work and hosting events. He video-recorded weddings. He loved ocean cruises and cars, buying a 1955 Thunderbird convertible after he retired.

== Death ==
Shaw died on September 22, 2017, at his home in Cooper City, Florida, where he lived for more than 30 years. He was predeceased by his wife, Elaine, who died at age 57 in 2001. He is survived by his two sons, Rick Hummel and Sean Hummel, from a previous marriage.
