= Everglades High School =

Public school in Miramar, Florida, US

Coordinates: 25.9714812°N 80.3736634°W

Location
- 17100 SW 48th Ct; Miramar, Florida 33027; United States

Information
- Type: Public
- Established: 2003
- School district: Broward County Public Schools
- Superintendent: Howard Hepburn
- Principal: Marie Duperval
- Teaching staff: 79.00 (FTE)
- Grades: 9–12
- Enrollment: 1,973 (2024–2025)
- Student to teacher ratio: 24.79
- Hours in school day: 7:40 a.m.–2:40 p.m.
- Campus: Suburban
- Colors: Black and silver
- Team name: Gator
- Website: evergladeshigh.browardschools.com

Everglades High School is a public school located in Miramar, Florida, United States. The school serves approximately 2,033 students from Miramar and Pembroke Pines in grades 9 through 12.

In the 2007–2008 school year, due to overpopulation, West Broward High School was constructed in Pembroke Pines, Florida, to resolve the overcrowding issue.

Everglades High had an FCAT school grade of "A" for the 2023–2024 school year. Everglades has a student to teacher ratio of 24:1, above the state average of 15:1.

== History ==
Everglades High School was created to provide students in the Southern District of West Broward a secondary education school. At the time only Miramar High School, Charles W. Flanagan High School, and Cypress Bay High School composed the Southwest Region of secondary High Schools in the Broward County School District.

The temporary location was at the former Charles W. Flanagan High School's Annex location because of the ongoing final construction of the Everglades main building. The school schedule was held in double sessions during the months at the annex because of the large population, where the class of 2007 freshman had classes from 12:30 p.m. to 5:30 p.m. and upperclassmen had classes from 7:00 a.m. to 12:00 p.m. The class of 2004 had a total of 12 senior students.

For the 2007–2008 school year, freshmen students were sent to the annex portable site that they had originally used for the school's first class of students. The following school year, Everglades High School was given new school boundaries due to the newly constructed West Broward High School in the Pembroke Pines area. Since then, all students—including freshman—take their classes at Everglades High School and the former Charles W. Flanagan Annex is no longer in use for freshmen.

In 2010, former Florida governor Charlie Crist visited the high school to honor the recognition of the school's success in improving test scores and graduation rates.

In 2012, principal Paul D. Fletcher retired from his position, having served the school since its opening.

In June 2018, Everglades High School hosted the National Speech and Debate competition along with other schools across the Fort Lauderdale region.

On February 16, 2023, there was a bomb threat in the school, and students were evacuated to the nearby Glades Middle School before given an all clear by the Miramar Police.

== Demographics ==
As of the 2023-2024 school year, the total student enrollment was 2,033. The ethnic makeup of the school was 42% Black, 37.6% Hispanic, 10.6% Asian, 0.1% Pacific Islander, 5-6% White, 3.9% Multiracial, and 0.7% Native American or Native Alaskan.

== Academics ==
Everglades High School offers programs in the field of engineering and sports medicine. The engineering program is MasterCam Certified, and students are eligible to receive a certification through the CNC program. The sports medicine program was started in the 2014–2015 school year.

In addition to these career-oriented school programs, Everglades High School has implemented a Cambridge International Program, awarding Advanced International Certificates of Education, affiliated with the University of Cambridge. It is described by the school as an "accelerated program" that offers a "flexible, broad-based curriculum."

As of 2026, the school has seen alumni move on to top-ranking colleges and universities. Notably, the class of 2017 graduated students who matriculated into Ivy League institutions (Harvard, Yale, and Cornell), Pomona College, University of Miami, University of Florida, and the US Air Force Academy.

== JROTC ==
The JROTC program at Everglades has maintained an Honor Unit with Distinction (HUD) status since 2007 and has sent cadets to several competitive national conventions including the George C. Marshal Leadership Symposium, and the JROTC Academic Bowl.

The Gator Battalion participated in the Broward County Drill Meet, The Superintendents Pass and Review. The Battalion received its highest marks on their annual inspection by the County SAI. In the 2014–2015 school year, the Gator Battalion Drill Team won first place for Dual Exhibition Drill and fourth place for Male Armed Color Guard at the Florida AJROTC State Drill Competition.

== Everglades Legacy Choir ==
Established in 2004, and under the direction of Elvin Negron as of 2015, the multi-award-winning choir has been recognized as one of the nation's best public/non-magnet school choirs. Also having won multiple out-of-state competitions and being featured in numerous televised events, the choir performed in the singing of the national anthem at the 2014 Miami Heat vs. Cleveland Cavaliers Christmas game.

For many years the choir has been a regular participant of the Merrick Festival Caroling Competition at Coral Gables, in most occasions being placed as a Grand Champion or a runner-up.

Since its inception the choir has consistently achieved in gaining “Superior” ratings in their Music Performance Assessments at both the district and the state level, exclusively having performed at the FMEA President's Concert in two separate occasions.

In 2015, Everglades Legacy Vocal Ensemble was awarded as a Choir of Distinction at the 2015 MPA State Assessment. Likewise, Everglades Legacy Men's Choir was nominated for the Choir of Distinction award.

== Notable alumni ==
- Joe Brady, offensive coordinator for the Buffalo Bills
- Sabrina Claudio, singer, Grammy winner, songwriter for Beyoncé
- SpaceGhostPurrp, rapper
- Tory Lanez, rapper
