= Country Estates, Florida =

- Neighborhood
- Interactive map of Country Estates, Florida
- Coordinates: 26°2′58″N 80°24′32″W
- Country: United States
- State: Florida
- County: Broward
- Town: Southwest Ranches

Area
  - Total: 4.0 sq mi (10.4 km^{2})
  - Land: 4.0 sq mi (10.4 km^{2})
  - Water: 0 sq mi (0.0 km^{2})

Population (2000)
  - Total: 1,910
  - Density: 478/sq mi (184.4/km^{2})
- Time zone: UTC-5 (Eastern (EST))
  - Summer (DST): UTC-4 (EDT)
- FIPS code: 12-15025

Country Estates was a census-designated place (CDP) in Broward County, Florida, United States. The population was 1,910 at the 2000 census. It is now a neighborhood incorporated into the town of Southwest Ranches, Florida in 2000.

== Geography ==
Country Estates is located at 26°2′58″N 80°24′32″W (26.049367, -80.408852).

According to the United States Census Bureau, the CDP has a total area of 10.4 km^{2} (4.0 sq mi), all land.

== Demographics ==
As of the census of 2000, there were 1,910 people, 568 households, and 511 families residing in the CDP. The population density was 184.4 people/km^{2} (478 people/mi^{2}). There were 578 housing units at an average density of 55.8 units/km^{2} (145 units/mi^{2}). The racial makeup of the CDP was 91.57% White (74.7% were Non-Hispanic White,) 2.93% African American, 0.31% Native American, 1.57% Asian, 1.88% from other races, and 1.73% from two or more races. Hispanic or Latino of any race were 18.74% of the population.

There were 568 households, out of which 48.4% had children under the age of 18 living with them, 82.2% were married couples living together, 4.6% had a female householder with no husband present, and 10.0% were non-families. 6.7% of all households were made up of individuals, and 0.9% had someone living alone who was 65 years of age or older. The average household size was 3.35 and the average family size was 3.49.

In the CDP, the population was spread out, with 29.2% under the age of 18, 6.6% from 18 to 24, 29.9% from 25 to 44, 28.0% from 45 to 64, and 6.3% who were 65 years of age or older. The median age was 38 years. For every 100 females, there were 106.9 males. For every 100 females age 18 and over, there were 101.5 males.

The median income for a household in the CDP was $90,154, and the median income for a family was $94,743. Males had a median income of $51,250 versus $37,963 for females. The per capita income for the CDP was $36,117. About 1.5% of families and 4.2% of the population were below the poverty line, including none of those under the age of eighteen or sixty-five or over.

As of 2000, before annexation to Southwest Ranches, speakers of English as a first language accounted for 78.46% of all residents, while Spanish as a mother tongue made up 21.53% of the population.

== Government and infrastructure ==
Florida Department of Corrections operates the Region IV Correctional Facility Office on the grounds of Broward Correctional Institution in the former Country Estates CDP. The Broward prison formerly housed the female death row. In February 2003 the female death row moved to the Lowell Annex.
