= Ivanhoe Estates, Florida =

- Community and Former CDP
- Map of Davie. The Southwestern peninsular part of Davie is part of the wider Ivanhoe neighborhood with the grey enclave in that peninsular part being Ivanhoe Estates.
- Coordinates: 26°3′17″N 80°20′57″W
- Country: United States
- State: Florida
- County: Broward
- City: Southwest Ranches
- Neighborhood: Ivanhoe

Area
  - Total: 0.23 sq mi (0.6 km^{2})
  - Land: 0.19 sq mi (0.5 km^{2})
  - Water: 0 sq mi (0.0 km^{2})

Population (2000)
  - Total: 279
  - Density: 1,329/sq mi (513.1/km^{2})
- Time zone: UTC-5 (Eastern (EST))
  - Summer (DST): UTC-4 (EDT)
- Postal code: 33331
- FIPS code: 12-34362

Ivanhoe Estates was a census-designated place (CDP) in Broward County, Florida, United States. It is located in the Miami metropolitan area. The population was 279 at the 2000 census. It's now a community incorporated into Southwest Ranches, Florida in 2000. Ivanhoe Estates is part of the larger Ivanhoe neighborhood that is split between Southwest Ranches and southwestern Davie, and includes the other Ivanhoe communities, in neighboring Davie, of Hawkes Bluff, Falcon's Lea, Waterford, Cross Bow, and Waverly Hundred, as well as the Les Chateux, Sheridan Glen, The Enclave, and Chelsea at Ivanhoe communities.

== Geography ==
Ivanhoe Estates is located at 26°03′17″N 80°20′57″W.

=== Other communities ===
- Ivanhoe Estates, is also the name for a gated community located in unincorporated Lake County, Illinois 42°17′10″N 88°03′46″W.

According to the United States Census Bureau, the CDP has a total area of 0.6 km^{2} (0.23 sq mi). 0.5 km^{2} (0.19 sq mi) of it is land and 4.55% is water.

== Demographics ==
At the 2000 census, there were 279 people, 70 households and 63 families residing in the CDP. The population density was 513.0 people/km^{2} (1,329 people/mi^{2}). There were 72 housing units at an average density of 132.4 units/km^{2} (343 units/mi^{2}). The racial makeup of the CDP was 76.34% White (63.1% were Non-Hispanic White,) 7.53% African American, 9.32% Asian, 3.58% from other races, and 3.23% from two or more races. Hispanic or Latino of any race were 19.00% of the population.

There were 70 households, of which 64.3% had children under the age of 18 living with them, 78.6% were married couples living together, 2.9% had a female householder with no husband present, and 10.0% were non-families. 5.7% of all households were made up of individuals, and 1.4% had someone living alone who was 65 years of age or older. The average household size was 3.99 and the average family size was 4.05.

36.6% of the population were under the age of 18, 7.9% from 18 to 24, 30.8% from 25 to 44, 21.1% from 45 to 64, and 3.6% who were 65 years of age or older. The median age was 30 years. For every 100 females, there were 108.2 males. For every 100 females age 18 and over, there were 105.8 males.

The median household income was $115,130 and the median family income was $120,658. Males had a median income of $84,757 compared with $27,500 for females. The per capita income for the CDP was $24,218. None of the families and 2.0% of the population were living below the poverty line.

In 2000, before being annexed to Southwest Ranches, English as a first language accounted for 100% of the population.
