= Omar Raja =

Sports commentator (born 1994)

- Born: April 16, 1994 (age 32)
- Education: West Broward High School
- Alma mater: University of Central Florida
- Occupations: House of Highlights, ESPN
- Years active: 2014–present
- Employer: ESPN
- Known for: House of Highlights on Instagram
- Website: www.instagram.com/sportscenter/?hl=en

Omar Raja (born 16 April 1994) is a TV, digital, and social content commentator for ESPN and is the founder of the House of Highlights Instagram account which focuses on the publication of viral video clips of professional sports and user-generated content. After being acquired by Bleacher Report in December 2015, House of Highlights has expanded its video content and scope, and has amassed over 39.3 million followers.

== Biography ==
Raja was born to Hayder and Ismat Raja, who emigrated from Pakistan to the United States in the late 1980s. His only sibling is his little sister, Sabeen Raja. He grew up in Pembroke Pines, Florida, and graduated from West Broward High School. In an interview with Esquire, Raja said that he was not good at playing sports, but was interested in following sports, and of the sports activities he did do such as basketball, he got to develop his abilities to see opportunities quickly. He attended University of Central Florida where he majored in business.

In July 2014, when Raja was a 20-year-old college sophomore, when NBA star LeBron James left the Miami Heat to return to the Cleveland Cavaliers, Raja wanted to find videos on YouTube or social media to relive and to share memorable moments of the team with friends. After about a month of searching, he decided he needed to do it himself. He started an Instagram account in August called The Highlight Factory, but changed the name to House of Highlights about a week later. He would collect video footage of the Heat players both on and off the court, and post highlight clips, many of which had not been widely circulated. His posts were often accompanied with brief messages and emojis. Posts were user-generated, either by himself or by other followers submitting them for consideration. Raja estimates about 53% of his audience is under the age of 24.

In July 2015, Doug Bernstein, then the vice-president of social media at Bleacher Report, contacted Raja about working together. Raja had about half a million followers on Instagram at the time. Bleacher Report acquired House of Highlights in December, and hired Raja after he graduated. In January 2016, the Instagram account had 2.1 million followers, and in March 2017, it had over 5 million followers. Dave Finocchio, the CEO of Bleacher Report, likens Raja to the modern or young person's SportsCenter, and it was also noted by the website Crowd Tangle that the account has one of the highest interaction rates (number of users who comment or like). Bernstein said that for the month of November 2017, House of Highlights had 102 million interactions, the eighth-most for Instagram. In July 2018, the account had over 10 million followers. In October 2018, Esquire reported that House of Highlights would get about 700 million video views a month during the NBA season, with 10,000 new followers daily.

Under Bleacher Report, House of Highlights has gathered sponsors and expanded its content. The first sponsor was Lexus in 2016, where they produced about 7-10 videos highlighting some of the user-submitted content. They also created content for Nike, Jordan Brand, and Adidas. House of Highlights produced a set of videos for Under Armour's "The Curry Challenge" where they posted clips of ordinary people trying to imitate Stephen Curry's moves.

Other challenges that House of Highlights is said to have popularized include the Running Man Challenge and the Drive By Dunk Challenge, the latter of which people would drive in neighborhoods looking for basketball hoops, rush in with a basketball, and do a dunk. In 2017, HoH posted clips of Carmelo Anthony wearing a hoodie, which soon became a meme with the nickname "Hoodie Melo", which expanded to a clothing brand.

In January 2018, Bleacher Report launched a video show for House of Highlights on YouTube. The YouTube channel also features a sketch comedy web series called Supreme Dreams Show featuring YouTuber star Mark Phillips. In October, they launched a monthly Twitter digital television show co-hosted by Raja and creative director / head writer CJ Toledano with athletes and entertainers as guests. In April 2019, Twitter ordered a second season of the House of Highlights show that emphasized live sporting events including NBA All Star Weekend, the NBA Finals, March Madness, the UEFA Champions League Finals and the Super Bowl.

Raja also hosts an interview series with athletes that has included guests such as Dwyane Wade, Stephen Curry, Jason Williams, Damian Lillard, DeMar DeRozan, among other NBA players.

In 2019, House of Highlights became the only U.S. sports media brand to surpass ESPN in followers across all social platforms. In November 2019, Raja announced that House of Highlights was officially the most followed U.S. Sports Media account on Instagram.

In 2020, it was announced by ESPN that Raja would be moving to ESPN from Bleacher Report to increase their social media presence. Raja will serve as the main voice of ESPN's “SportsCenter” Instagram account, which has 25 million followers, and will play a role in devising content for ESPN's mobile app. Raja also hosts a weekly studio show called “Hoop Streams” that has included guests such as Pau Gasol, Jaylen Brown, Ray Allen, and many more NBA athletes.
