= Pembroke Pines, Florida =

City in Florida, United States

- City
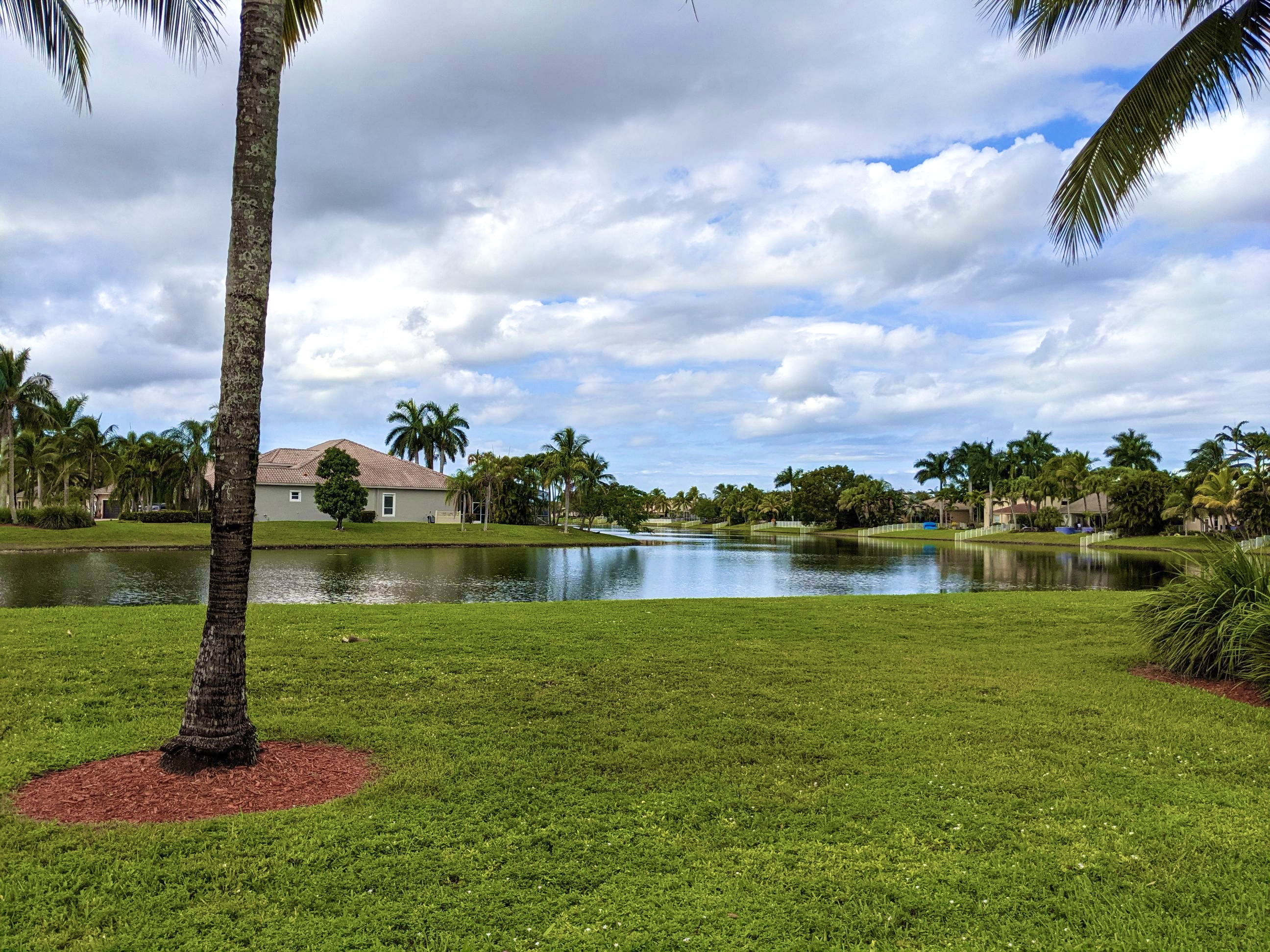
- Pembroke Falls, a residential development in Pembroke Pines, Florida

- Flag Seal
- Motto: "Join Us - Progress with Us"
- Interactive map of Pembroke Pines
- Coordinates: 26°00′35″N 80°18′49″W
- Country: United States
- State: Florida
- County: Broward
- Unofficially incorporated (village): March 2, 1959
- Incorporated (village): January 16, 1960
- Incorporated (city): May 22, 1961

Government
  - Type: Council-Manager
  - Mayor: Angelo Castillo (D)
  - Vice Mayor: Thomas Good, Jr.
  - Commissioners: Maria Rodriguez, Jay D. Schwartz, and Mike Hernández
  - City Manager: Charles F. Dodge
  - City Clerk: Marlene Graham

Area
  - Total: 34.76 sq mi (90.03 km^{2})
  - Land: 32.68 sq mi (84.64 km^{2})
  - Water: 2.08 sq mi (5.39 km^{2}) 4.88%
- Elevation: 0 ft (0 m)

Population (2020)
  - Total: 171,178
  - Estimate (2024): 179,326
  - Density: 5,237.8/sq mi (2,022.33/km^{2})
- Time zone: UTC-5 (Eastern (EST))
  - Summer (DST): UTC-4 (EDT)
- ZIP codes: 33023-33029, 33330-33332
- Area codes: 954, 754
- FIPS code: 12-55775
- GNIS feature ID: 2404502
- Website: City of Pembroke Pines

Pembroke Pines (/ˈpɛmˌbroʊk ˈpaɪnz/) is a city in southern Broward County, Florida, United States. The city is located 22 miles (35 km) north of Miami. It is a suburb of the Miami metropolitan area and its fourth-most populous city. The population of Pembroke Pines was 171,178 at the 2020 census.

== History ==
Pembroke Pines was officially incorporated on January 16, 1960. The city's name, Pembroke Pines, is traced back to Sir Edward J. Reed, a member of Britain's Parliament for the County of Pembroke from 1874 to 1880, who in 1882 formed the Florida Land and Mortgage Company to purchase from Hamilton Disston a total of 2 million acres of mostly swampland located throughout the southern Florida. A road through one of the tracts came to be known as Pembroke Road. When incorporating the city, Walter Smith Kipnis, the city's first mayor, suggested the name Pembroke Pines because of the pine trees growing near Pembroke Road.

The first inhabitants of the area were Native Americans, who first appeared about 4,000 years ago. Skeletal remains of animal hunters dating back about 10,000 years were found around Broward County, showing that perhaps human beings had lived in the area even earlier.

The community started as agricultural land home to numerous dairy farms, but grew after World War II as service members were retiring. Large eastern sections of the area were part of the Waldrep Dairy Farm, including the present-day Pembroke Lakes Mall. The first two subdivisions were called Pembroke Pines. One of the first homes in the city belonged to Kipnis, the city's first mayor, and was built in 1956. It was then known as the "Village of Pembroke Pines" and incorporated into a village in 1959. Builders contested the incorporation, so a legal battle ensued concerning the boundaries of the new municipality. City services were added in the 1960s with the building of the first fire station near North Perry Airport. University Drive was then the western edge of habitable land.

In January 1960, Pembroke Pines held another election, which allowed the village to become a city. This small municipality was less than a square mile and was between Hollywood Boulevard and SW 72nd Avenue with the Florida Turnpike to the east. Pembroke Pines sought to improve citizen involvement by organizing the Pembroke Pines Civic Association. The square-mile city was unable to expand due to North Perry Airport as well as the South Florida State Hospital. Joseph LaCroix, a developer, requested his 320 acres (1.3 km^{2}) of land north of Pines Boulevard annexed to the city. This gave a new pathway to proceed westward. In 1977, Broward Correctional Institution a maximum security prison, was built in the northwestern part of town. The facility closed in 2012. In 1980, property from Flamingo Road to U.S. 27 was incorporated into Pembroke Pines, doubling the size of the city. This expansion included C.B. Smith Park, the Miami-Hollywood Motorsports Park as well as what was once the Hollywood Sportatorium. Also, in 1980, construction began to extend Interstate 75 from U.S. 27 towards Miami, passing through the newly annexed western part of the city. By 1984 the expressway reached Pines Boulevard, the main east-west arterial road in the city.

In May 1977, the Grateful Dead put on a storied performance at the Hollywood Sportatorium. Many Deadheads consider the version of "Sugaree" played during the first set to be the band's—and particularly guitarist Jerry Garcia's—finest performance of the song.

The city's rapid population growth in the mid-to late 1990s was part of the effect of Hurricane Andrew in 1992. Thousands of southern Miami-Dade County residents moved northward to Broward County, many to Pembroke Pines. The resulting boom ranked the City of Pembroke Pines third in a list of "Fastest Growing Cities" in the United States, in 1999. The increase in population has increased the need for schools. In 2003, Charles W. Flanagan High School had close to 6,000 students, making it the most populated high school in Florida. In response to Broward County's need to keep up with demands, Mayor Alex Fekete and City Manager Charles Dodge started a charter school system. As of 2006, Pembroke Pines had the largest charter school system in the county. The city is also home to campuses for Broward College and Florida International University. The city's population had grown from 65,452 in 1990 to 157,594 in 2011.

In 2001, Pembroke Pines was home to the most dangerous road intersection (Pines Boulevard and Flamingo Road) in the United States, according to State Farm Insurance. City residents passed a bond initiative to allow the city to begin construction to redesign the intersection. The intersection has since been expanded with additional east/west Pines Boulevard lanes.

As developers expanded Pembroke Pines westward, more hurricanes have affected the city and its residents. In 1999, Hurricane Irene dumped up to 16 in (410 mm) of rain in the city. The western communities, such as Chapel Trail and Silver Lakes, received an estimated 19 in (480 mm). Then in 2004, Hurricane Frances and Jeanne passed to the north (Palm Beach County), but brought tropical storm-force winds and left minor tree and shrub damage. The 2005 hurricane season left a mark on the city. Hurricane Katrina passed directly over the city as a category-one storm. In its wake, it left some damage, such as downed power lines and trees, especially in the Chapel Trail and Silver Lakes developments. In late October, the eye of Hurricane Wilma passed about 20 miles (32 km) toward the north of the city, which saw the strongest winds its residents had experienced in decades. The strongest wind officially recorded in the city was a 92-mile-per-hour (148 km/h) sustained wind, with a 101-mile-per-hour (163 km/h) wind gust. Most of the city was left without power for days, lights at intersections had been destroyed, a riot at a gas station led to it being closed, most landscaping was destroyed or damaged beyond repair, and minor structural damage (mainly roof and screen damage) occurred. In addition, schools remained closed for two weeks.

== Geography ==
A 2017 study put the city in third place for US cities most vulnerable to coastal flooding, with 116,000 residents living within FEMA's coastal floodplain.

=== Climate ===
Pembroke Pines has a tropical monsoon climate (Am) with hot, wet summers and warm, dry winters.

Climate data for North Perry Airport, Florida, 1991–2020 normals, extremes 1999–present
Month	Jan	Feb	Mar	Apr	May	Jun	Jul	Aug	Sep	Oct	Nov	Dec	Year
Record high °F (°C)	85 (29)	91 (33)	94 (34)	98 (37)	97 (36)	99 (37)	98 (37)	98 (37)	98 (37)	94 (34)	101 (38)	91 (33)	101 (38)
Mean maximum °F (°C)	85.4 (29.7)	87.2 (30.7)	89.9 (32.2)	92.1 (33.4)	93.4 (34.1)	95.7 (35.4)	95.1 (35.1)	95.6 (35.3)	94.2 (34.6)	91.8 (33.2)	87.8 (31.0)	86.0 (30.0)	97.0 (36.1)
Mean daily maximum °F (°C)	76.9 (24.9)	78.9 (26.1)	81.3 (27.4)	84.5 (29.2)	87.3 (30.7)	90.0 (32.2)	91.7 (33.2)	91.8 (33.2)	89.8 (32.1)	86.8 (30.4)	82.2 (27.9)	78.6 (25.9)	85.0 (29.4)
Daily mean °F (°C)	68.1 (20.1)	70.2 (21.2)	72.7 (22.6)	76.4 (24.7)	80.0 (26.7)	83.0 (28.3)	84.4 (29.1)	84.6 (29.2)	83.2 (28.4)	80.1 (26.7)	74.7 (23.7)	70.7 (21.5)	77.3 (25.2)
Mean daily minimum °F (°C)	59.4 (15.2)	61.5 (16.4)	64.1 (17.8)	68.3 (20.2)	72.7 (22.6)	75.9 (24.4)	77.1 (25.1)	77.5 (25.3)	76.5 (24.7)	73.4 (23.0)	67.1 (19.5)	62.9 (17.2)	69.7 (20.9)
Mean minimum °F (°C)	42.3 (5.7)	46.0 (7.8)	49.6 (9.8)	58.0 (14.4)	64.4 (18.0)	71.4 (21.9)	72.3 (22.4)	73.3 (22.9)	72.3 (22.4)	62.1 (16.7)	53.2 (11.8)	49.1 (9.5)	39.9 (4.4)
Record low °F (°C)	34 (1)	35 (2)	40 (4)	51 (11)	56 (13)	67 (19)	69 (21)	69 (21)	67 (19)	46 (8)	43 (6)	34 (1)	34 (1)
Average precipitation inches (mm)	2.71 (69)	2.83 (72)	2.68 (68)	3.18 (81)	5.18 (132)	8.72 (221)	6.82 (173)	8.49 (216)	7.98 (203)	7.65 (194)	3.56 (90)	2.18 (55)	61.98 (1,574)
Average precipitation days (≥ 0.01 in)	8.5	7.7	7.2	7.4	11.6	17.8	17.4	18.6	17.9	14.2	10.0	9.7	148.0
Source: NOAA (mean maxima/minima 2006–2020)

=== Surrounding areas ===
Southwest Ranches, Davie, Cooper City, Hollywood
The Everglades Hollywood
The Everglades Hollywood
The Everglades Hollywood
Miramar

The area of Pembroke Pines west of Interstate 75 is commonly known as "West Pines", and consists mostly of subdivisions built since Hurricane Andrew.

== Demographics ==
Historical population
Census	Pop.	Note	%±
1960	1,429		—
1970	15,496		984.4%
1980	35,776		130.9%
1990	65,452		82.9%
2000	137,427		110.0%
2010	154,750		12.6%
2020	171,178		10.6%
2024 (est.)	179,326	▲	4.8%
U.S. Decennial Census; 1960–1970 1980 1990; 2000 2010 2020 2024

Historical demographics	2020	2010	2000	1990	1980
White (non-Hispanic)	21.2%	32.9%	52.7%	81.4%	91.1%
Hispanic or Latino	49.7%	41.4%	28.2%	11.5%	6.0%
Black or African American (non-Hispanic)	19.4%	18.4%	12.7%	5.0%	1.6%
Asian and Pacific Islander (non-Hispanic)	5.6%	4.9%	3.7%	1.9%	1.3%
Native American (non-Hispanic)	0.1%	0.2%	0.1%	0.1%	1.3%
Some other race (non-Hispanic)	0.9%	0.5%	0.5%	0.1%	1.3%
Two or more races (non-Hispanic)	3.0%	1.7%	2.1%	N/A	N/A
Population	171,178	154,750	137,427	65,452	35,776

=== Racial and ethnic composition ===
Pembroke Pines, Florida – Racial and ethnic composition Note: the US Census treats Hispanic/Latino as an ethnic category. This table excludes Latinos from the racial categories and assigns them to a separate category. Hispanics/Latinos may be of any race.
Race / Ethnicity (NH = Non-Hispanic)	Pop 1990	Pop 2000	Pop 2010	Pop 2020	% 1990	% 2000	% 2010	% 2020
White alone (NH)	53,380	72,464	50,964	36,313	81.35%	52.73%	32.93%	21.21%
Black or African American alone (NH)	3,268	17,471	28,435	33,188	4.99%	12.71%	18.37%	19.39%
Native American or Alaska Native alone (NH)	90	172	260	205	0.14%	0.13%	0.17%	0.12%
Asian alone (NH)	1,254	5,061	7,469	9,567	1.92%	3.68%	4.83%	5.59%
Native Hawaiian or Pacific Islander alone (NH)	x	47	55	60	x	0.03%	0.04%	0.04%
Other race alone (NH)	58	634	801	1,608	0.09%	0.46%	0.52%	0.94%
Mixed race or Multiracial (NH)	x	2,878	2,705	5,104	x	2.09%	1.75%	2.98%
Hispanic or Latino (any race)	7,402	38,700	64,061	85,133	11.31%	28.16%	41.40%	49.73%
Total	65,452	137,427	154,750	171,178	100.00%	100.00%	100.00%	100.00%

=== 2020 census ===
As of the 2020 United States census, there were 171,178 people, 60,210 households, and 41,163 families residing in the city.

=== 2010 census ===
As of the 2010 United States census, there were 154,750 people, 54,264 households, and 38,363 families residing in the city.

=== 2000 census ===
As of 2000, 36.2% had children under the age of 18 living with them, 56.4% were married couples living together, 11.1% had a female householder with no husband present, and 29.1% were not families. About 24.1% of all households were made up of individuals, and 12.5% had someone living alone who was 65 years of age or older. The average household size was 2.62 and the average family size was 3.13.

In 2000, the city the population was distributed as 25.6% under the age of 18, 6.4% from 18 to 24, 33.5% from 25 to 44, 19.3% from 45 to 64, and 15.2% who were 65 years of age or older. The median age was 36 years. For every 100 females, there were 87.3 males. For every 100 females age 18 and over, there were 81.8 males.

In 2000, the median income for a household in the city was $52,629, and for a family was $61,480. Males had a median income of $45,129 versus $32,531 for females. The per capita income for the city was $23,843. About 3.9% of families and 5.4% of the population were below the poverty line, including 5.2% of those under age 18 and 8.1% of those age 65 or over.

As of 2000, speakers of English as a first language were at 63.06%, while Spanish accounted for 27.91%, French made up 1.24%, French Creole was 0.99%, Portuguese was 0.94%, Italian was at 0.92%, Yiddish at 0.74%, and Tagalog was the mother tongue of 0.52% of the population.

As of 2000, Pembroke Pines had the 45th-highest percentage of Colombian residents in the US, at 3% of the city's population, and the 50th-highest percentage of Cuban residents in the US, at 8.66% of the city's population. It also had the 24th-highest percentage of Jamaicans in the US (tied with Wheatley Heights, New York), at 5.1% of all residents.

== Government ==
Pembroke Pines has a Commission-Manager form of government. The city commission has five members elected to four-year terms: a mayor elected city-wide and four commissioners elected from four Single-member districts.

== Education ==
Broward County Public Schools serve Pembroke Pines. In addition, several charter schools are located in Pembroke Pines, and the City of Pembroke Pines operates its own charter school system.

=== Public schools ===
High schools

Parts of the city are zoned to Everglades High School and Miramar High School in Miramar and McArthur High School in Hollywood.

- Charles W. Flanagan High School
- West Broward High School

=== Middle schools ===
Parts of the city are zoned to Apollo Middle School and Driftwood Middle School in Hollywood and Glades Middle School and New Renaissance Middle School in Miramar.

- Pines Middle School
- Silver Trail Middle School
- Walter C. Young Middle School

=== Elementary schools ===
Parts of the city are zoned to Boulevard Heights Elementary School and Sheridan Park Elementary School in Hollywood, Hawkes Bluff Elementary School in Davie, Manatee Bay Elementary School in Weston, and Miramar Elementary School, Silver Lakes Elementary School, Silver Shores STEAM Academy K–8, Sunset Lakes Elementary School, and Sunshine Elementary School in Miramar.

- Chapel Trail Elementary School
- Lakeside Elementary School
- Palm Cove Elementary School
- Panther Run Elementary School
- Pasadena Lakes Elementary School
- Pembroke Lakes Elementary School
- Pembroke Pines Elementary School
- Pines Lakes Elementary School
- Silver Palms Elementary School

=== Charter schools ===
- Pembroke Pines Charter High School
- Somerset Academy Charter High School
- Pembroke Pines Charter Middle School (Central, West, and Academic Village)
- Franklin Academy Charter School [K–8]
- Renaissance Charter Schools at Pines [K–8]
- Somerset Academy Charter Middle School
- Atlantic Montessori Charter School
- Franklin Academy Charter School [K–8]
- Greentree Preparatory Charter School
- Pembroke Pines Charter Elementary School (East, Central, West, and Florida State University campus)
- Renaissance Charter Schools at Pines [K–8]
- Somerset Academy Charter Elementary School

=== Higher education ===
- Florida Career College Pembroke Pines Campus
- The Broward-Pines Center regional campus of Barry University
- The Broward-Pines Center regional campus of Broward College
- The Broward-Pines Center regional campus of Florida International University
- The South regional campus of Broward College
- Keiser University Pembroke Pines Campus

== Infrastructure ==
=== Transportation ===
==== Airports ====
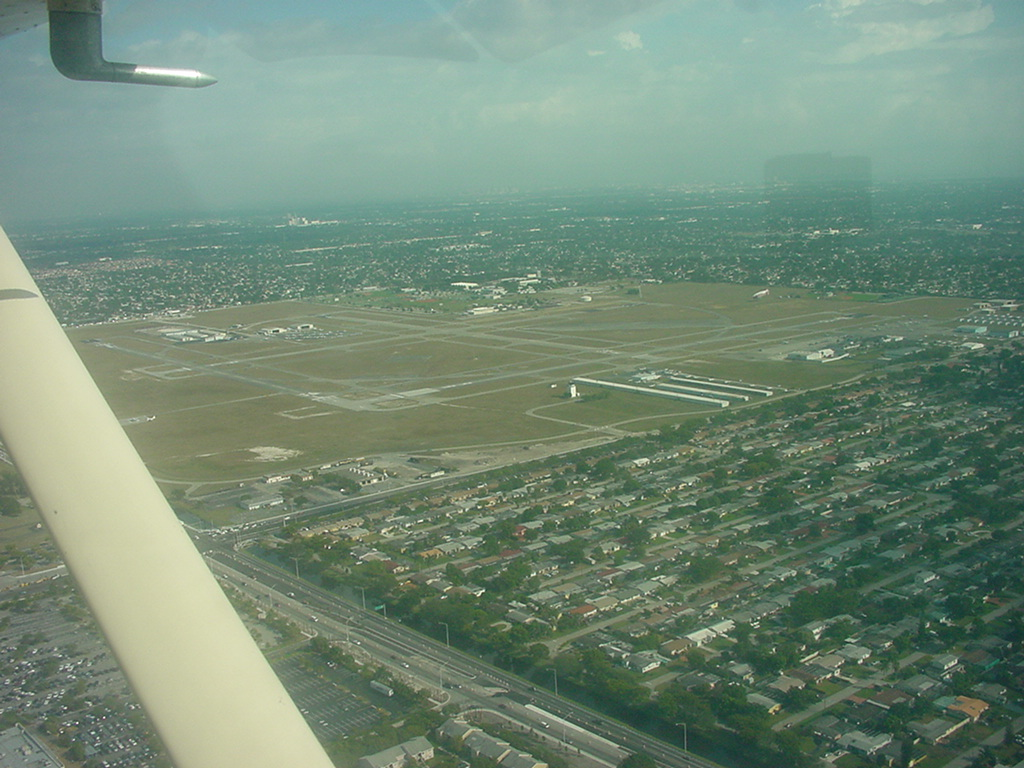
North Perry Airport from the air.

For scheduled commercial service, Pembroke Pines is primarily served by nearby Fort Lauderdale–Hollywood International Airport and Miami International Airport. The city itself is home to North Perry Airport, a general aviation airport owned by the Broward County Aviation Department.

==== Public transportation ====
Local bus service is provided by Broward County Transit. The city also partners with Broward County Transit to provide additional bus routes within the city limits.

==== Major expressways ====
- Interstate 75
- Florida's Turnpike (SR 91)

==== Other major roads ====
- U.S. 27
- University Drive
- Pines Boulevard
- Sheridan Street
- Flamingo Road
- Pembroke Road

=== Street grid ===
Streets in Pembroke Pines are numbered as a continuation of the street grid of neighboring Hollywood; streets are distinguished from those of Hollywood itself by adding a 'west' to the cardinal direction. Streets north of Pines Boulevard are labeled 'northwest' and those south of Pines Boulevard are labeled 'southwest'.

== Notable people ==
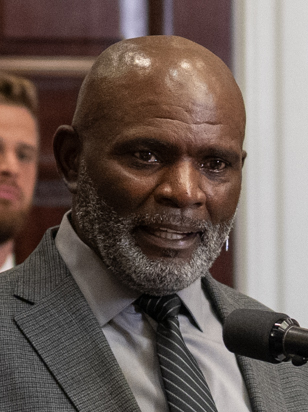
Lawrence Taylor

- Eric Alejandro, Puerto Rican Olympic hurdler
- Jim Alers, aka "The Beast", fighter, UFC veteran, bare-knuckle boxer
- Noah Allen, soccer player
- Kenny Anderson, former NBA player
- Baby Ariel (born 2000), social media personality, singer, and actress
- Geno Atkins, defensive lineman for NFL's Cincinnati Bengals
- José Bautista (pitcher) (born 1964), Major League Baseball (MLB) pitcher
- Kodak Black, rapper
- Ethan Bortnick (born 2000), pianist, singer, composer, actor, one of the world's youngest philanthropists
- Joe Brady, NFL head coach, Buffalo Bills
- Bridget Carey, technology journalist
- Triston Casas (born 2000), baseball player for the Boston Red Sox
- Colin Castleton, NBA player for the Orlando Magic
- Conceited, rapper and cast member on Wild 'n Out
- Danny Farquhar, MLB pitcher for Tampa Bay Rays (former resident)
- Jeff Fiorentino, MLB outfielder for the Baltimore Orioles (former resident)
- Shayne Gostisbehere, defenseman for the NHL's Carolina Hurricanes
- David Hess, MLB pitcher for the Miami Marlins
- Maurice Kemp (born 1991), basketball player in the Israeli Basketball Premier League
- Sofia Kenin (born 1998), tennis player, winner of the 2020 Australian Open, ranked as high as world #4
- Nicholas Monteiro, Brazilian racing driver
- Mike Napoli, MLB player for the Cleveland Indians, All Star
- Joe Perez, MLB player for the Houston Astros
- Chase Priskie, NHL player for the Florida Panthers
- Lil Pump, rapper
- SpaceGhostPurrp, rapper, attended school in Pembroke Pines
- Omar Raja, founder of House of Highlights
- Manny Ramírez (born 1972), Dominican-American retired MLB outfielder, 12x All Star
- Juan Sebastián Restrepo, Army medic killed in Afghanistan; resident from 1999–2006
- Fernando Rodney, relief pitcher for the Washington Nationals
- Lawrence Taylor (born 1959), former NFL star for the New York Giants, Pro Football Hall of Fame
- Niki Taylor (born 1975), model
- Vince Taylor, professional bodybuilder
- Bella Thorne, actress and model
- Touki Toussaint, MLB player for the Atlanta Braves
- Mark Vientos (born 1999), MLB player for the New York Mets
- David Villar, MLB player for the San Francisco Giants
- Mike White, quarterback for the NFL's Miami Dolphins
- Walter C. Young, Florida businessman and legislator
