= Olindo Mare =

American football player (born 1973)

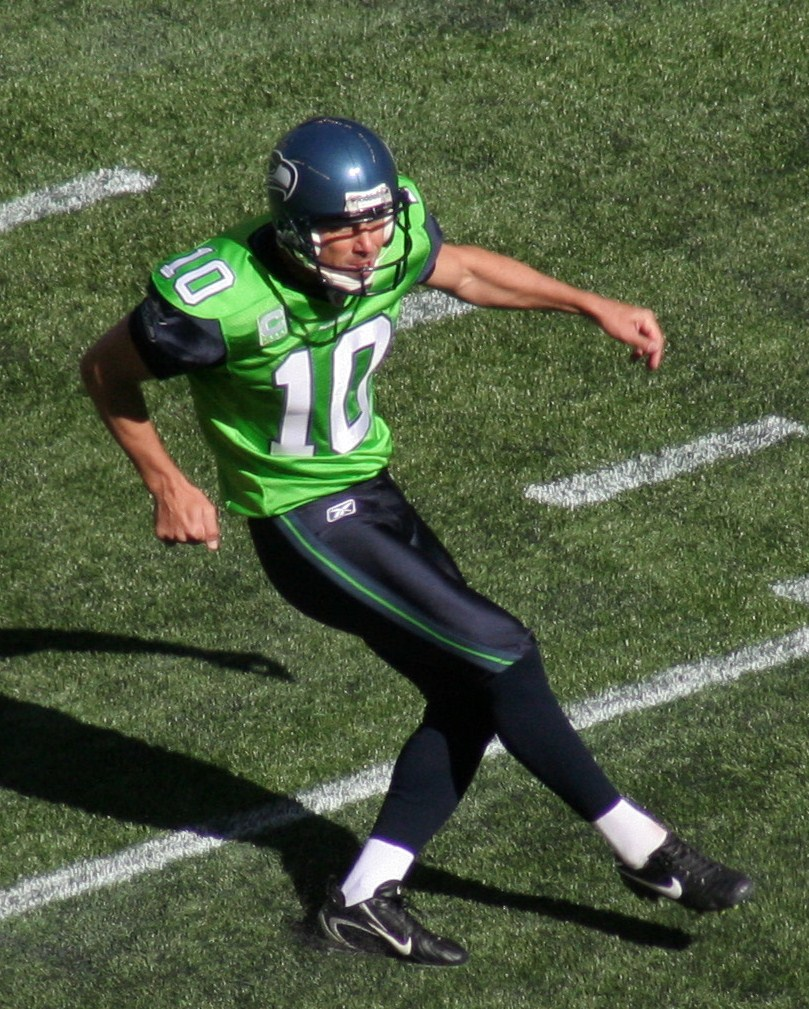
- Mare with the Seattle Seahawks in 2009

No. 10, 2
- Position: Placekicker

Personal information
- Born: June 6, 1973 (age 53); Hollywood, Florida, U.S.
- Listed height: 5 ft 11 in (1.80 m)
- Listed weight: 185 lb (84 kg)

Career information
- High school: Cooper City (Cooper City, Florida)
- College: MacMurray (1991); Valencia (1992–1993); Syracuse (1994–1995)
- NFL draft: 1996: undrafted

Career history
- New York Giants (1996)*; Miami Dolphins (1997–2006); New Orleans Saints (2007); Seattle Seahawks (2008–2010); Carolina Panthers (2011); Chicago Bears (2012)
- * Offseason or practice squad member only

Awards and highlights
- First-team All-Pro (1999); Pro Bowl (1999)

Career NFL statistics
- Field goals made: 356
- Field goals attempted: 439
- Field goal %: 81.1
- Longest field goal: 54
- Points scored: 1,555
- Stats at Pro Football Reference

Olindo Franco Mare oh-LIN-doh MAR-ay; (born June 6, 1973) is an American former professional football player who was a placekicker in the National Football League (NFL). He was originally signed by the New York Giants as an undrafted free agent in 1996. He played college football at MacMurray College and Syracuse. Mare, who was selected to the Pro Bowl in 1999, has also played for the Miami Dolphins, New Orleans Saints, Seattle Seahawks, Carolina Panthers and Chicago Bears.

== Early life ==
Mare attended Cooper City High School (Cooper City, Florida), lettering in football and soccer. Olindo Mare graduated from Cooper City High School in 1991. Olindo played at MacMurray College in Jacksonville, Illinois and finished his college career for the Syracuse Orange.

== Professional career ==
Pre-draft measurables
Height	Weight	Arm length	Hand span
5 ft 10 1/8 in (1.78 m)	180 lb (82 kg)	29 1/4 in (0.74 m)	9 3/4 in (0.25 m)
All values from NFL Combine

=== New York Giants ===
Mare was originally signed by the New York Giants as an undrafted free agent in 1996, but he was released before the season.

=== Miami Dolphins ===
Mare played the first 10 seasons of his career with the Miami Dolphins.

In 2001, Mare attempted his first, and only rushing attempt on a fake field goal against the Carolina Panthers. He was stopped for a five-yard loss.

On October 10, 2004, when Mare was out with a calf injury, wide receiver Wes Welker replaced him and became only the second player in NFL history to return a kickoff and a punt, kick an extra point and a field goal, and make a tackle in a single game.

During the 2005 season, he made 25 of 30 field goals, averaged 67.0 yards per kickoff, and had 16 touchbacks in 73 kicks. Mare also recorded his first career fumble recovery during the season on an onside kick.

=== New Orleans Saints ===
On April 3, 2007, the Dolphins traded Mare to the New Orleans Saints for a 2007 sixth-round draft pick. He inherited the position from kicker John Carney, who was released from the team a day after.

He missed his first field goal attempt of the 2007 season against the Indianapolis Colts. At the midway point of the 2007 season, Mare had made exactly half of his field goal attempts. He also missed 3 field goals in the final preseason game. Early in the season, it was revealed that Mare injured his groin muscle, and punter Steven Weatherford took over on kick-offs for a few games. While playing the Jacksonville Jaguars, Mare missed his second attempt of the game, and ended up being called on again a few minutes later after the Saints intercepted and drove back into field goal range. Fans booed Mare as he walked onto the field to attempt the long shot (over 50 yards), which he missed. Despite the reaction of fans, and his extremely poor play, head coach Sean Payton continued to stand by the kicker until he was injured in the second game against the Atlanta Falcons, and replaced with Martín Gramática.

On February 27, 2008, he was released from the Saints after only one season.

=== Seattle Seahawks ===
On March 27, 2008, Mare signed with the Seattle Seahawks to a two-year contract worth $3.5 million. He won the kicking battle during training camp and pre-season against Brandon Coutu. He had a superb 2008 season, as he finished the season making 24/27 field goals and making all of his PATs.

In 2009, Mare faced significant scrutiny after missing two field goals in a week 3 game against the Chicago Bears. The misses resulted in a six-point loss for the Seahawks. In a post-game news conference, head coach Jim L. Mora called Mare's playing "not acceptable". Olindo Mare had a fantastic 2009 season as he finished with 24/26 field goals, with a franchise record 21 straight (since surpassed by Jason Myers in 2020). He earned a 2009 Pro Bowl Alternate honor and a franchise tag that gave him a base salary of what the top five kickers earned in the NFL or a 20% salary increase, whichever was greater.

Dick Stockton's inability to pronounce Mare's last name correctly has resulted in the nickname Mar-AA. Mar-AA is a reference to a Seattle drinking game.

=== Carolina Panthers ===
After the Panthers released popular kicker John Kasay, the Panthers were looking for a proven kicker. On July 27, 2011, the Carolina Panthers signed Mare to a four-year, $12 million contract. However, a year after signing the deal, and after Mare missed two game-winning field goals, the Panthers cut him.

=== Chicago Bears ===
On December 11, 2012, the Bears signed Mare to a one-year deal due to an injury to Robbie Gould. Mare beat out Billy Cundiff and Neil Rackers for the job. Mare played his first game as a Bear on December 16, 2012, against the Green Bay Packers. Mare was successful on both of his field goal attempts, but the Bears would go on to lose 21–13. In December 2013, he received a workout with the Lions, but did not make the team.

== Career regular season statistics ==
Career high/best bolded

Regular season statistics
Season	Team (record)	G	FGM	FGA	%	<20	20-29	30-39	40-49	50+	LNG	BLK	XPM	XPA	%	PTS
1997	MIA (9–7)	**16**	28	36	77.8	**2–2**	**14–15**	8–10	3–6	1–3	50	1	33	33	**100.0**	117
1998	MIA (10–6)	**16**	22	27	81.5	0–0	12–13	5–5	5–7	0–2	48	1	33	34	97.1	99
1999	MIA (9–7)	**16**	**39**	**46**	84.8	1–1	9–9	**17–17**	9–14	3–5	**54**	1	27	27	**100.0**	**144**
2000	MIA (11–5)	**16**	28	31	90.3	0–0	7–8	9–10	**12–13**	0–0	49	0	33	34	97.1	117
2001	MIA (11–5)	**16**	19	21	90.5	1–1	8–8	8–8	2–4	0–0	46	1	39	40	97.5	96
2002	MIA (9–7)	**16**	24	31	77.4	0–0	13–14	2–3	7–11	2–3	53	1	42	43	97.7	114
2003	MIA (10–6)	**16**	22	29	75.9	0–0	9–9	3–6	6–8	**4–6**	52	2	33	34	97.1	99
2004	MIA (4–12)	11	12	16	75.0	0–0	1–2	6–7	3–4	2–3	51	0	18	18	**100.0**	54
2005	MIA (9–7)	**16**	25	30	83.3	0–0	9–10	9–12	6–6	1–2	53	0	33	33	**100.0**	108
2006	MIA (6–10)	**16**	26	36	72.2	0–0	10–10	6–8	9–12	1–6	52	2	22	22	**100.0**	100
2007	NO (7–9)	13	10	17	58.8	0–0	4–5	3–4	2–3	1–5	52	1	34	34	**100.0**	64
2008	SEA (4–12)	**16**	24	27	88.9	0–0	7–7	9–10	5–6	3–4	51	0	30	30	**100.0**	102
2009	SEA (5–11)	**16**	24	26	**92.3**	0–0	9–9	10–11	5–7	0–0	47	0	28	28	**100.0**	100
2010	SEA (7–9)	**16**	25	30	83.3	**2–2**	10–12	7–7	5–7	1–2	51	0	31	31	**100.0**	106
2011	CAR (6–10)	**16**	22	28	78.6	1–1	7–7	6–9	8–9	0–2	45	**3**	**44**	**45**	97.8	110
2012	CHI (10–6)	3	6	8	75.0	0–0	2–3	3–3	1–2	0–0	40	1	7	7	**100.0**	25
Career (16 seasons)		235	356	439	81.1	7–7	131–141	111–130	88–119	19–43	54	14	487	493	98.8	1555

== Personal life ==
Mare is married to his wife Sandy, with three sons, Hayden, Rylan, and Landon, and one daughter, Kayla. Mare is mentioned in Wale's song "TV in the Radio" in the line "I kick it, kick it like Olindo." Mare is a fan of the Italian soccer team Juventus since his father was born in Rota Greca, Calabria.

Mare has taken up Footgolf, a new sport that caters to his kicking ability. He aims to qualify in 2023 to represent Team USA in the sport's 4th World Cup, being held in Orlando, Florida from May 26 through June 6, 2023.
