= North Perry Airport =

Airport in Florida, US

- IATA: HWO; ICAO: KHWO; FAA LID: HWO

Summary
- Airport type: Public
- Owner: Broward County Aviation Department
- Serves: Hollywood, Florida
- Elevation AMSL: 8 ft / 2 m
- Coordinates: 26°00′04″N 080°14′27″W
- Website: broward.org/NorthPerryAirport

Map
- Location of airport in Florida HWO (the United States)

Runways
Direction	Length		Surface
Direction	ft	m	Surface
10L/28R	3,241	988	Asphalt
10R/28L	3,255	992	Asphalt
01R/19L	3,260	994	Asphalt
01L/19R	3,350	1,021	Asphalt

Statistics (2018)
- Aircraft operations (year ending 5/2/2018): 117,649
- Based aircraft: 430
- Source: Federal Aviation Administration

North Perry Airport (IATA: HWO, ICAO: KHWO, FAA LID: HWO) is a public airport in the City of Pembroke Pines, 5 miles (8 km) west of the central business district of Hollywood, in Broward County, Florida, United States. It is also known as Hollywood North Perry Airport, hence the HWO codes. The airport is owned by the Broward County Aviation Department. It is a general aviation airport devoted to private and business light aircraft activity.

== History ==
In 1943, Henry D. Perry, a dairy farmer, sold 640 acres (259 ha) of land to the United States Navy for a flight training field between Hollywood Boulevard and Pembroke Road. It became known as North Perry Field, and functioned as an auxiliary training facility for the main naval air station NAS Miami, the present day Miami-Opa Locka Executive Airport. There also was South Perry Field, which was located to the southeast of North Perry (the Florida Turnpike runs right through this area today). South Perry was a grass field (no facilities/structures) and was intended only for North Perry overflow.

North Perry remained inactive after the war, until 1950 when it was acquired by Broward County to become a civilian airport. It was then upgraded for use by small aircraft, as a station for advertising blimps, and as an auxiliary use field for United States Coast Guard helicopters practicing search and rescue skills.

In the 1970s, the U.S. Army Reserve established an Army Aviation Support Facility (AASF) at the airport, making it a joint civil-military airport. AASF North Perry hosted the 347th Medical Detachment (RA) of the Army Reserve, an air ambulance unit flying the UH-1 Iroquois helicopter, also known as the "Huey." In 1990, the unit was mobilized to active duty and forward deployed to Southwest Asia in support of Operation DESERT SHIELD and Operation DESERT STORM. Returning in 1991, the unit and AASF North Perry were disestablished in 1997 when the Army Reserve temporarily opted to withdraw from Army Aviation and relinquish all Army Aviation missions to the Army National Guard. The Army Reserve later reversed course and retained most of its aviation units but did not reactivate the 347th MED DET (RA). One of the unit's helicopters, a UH-1V, Army Serial Number 68-13168, is currently in the collection of the Valiant Air Command Warbird Museum at Space Coast Regional Airport in Titusville, Florida while the AASF facilities were released to North Perry Airport for conversion to civilian use.

The facility suffered minor damage during Hurricane Wilma in 2005.

In 2007, North Perry Airport was named the 2008 "General Aviation Airport of the Year" by the Florida Department of Transportation.

== Facilities and aircraft ==
North Perry Airport covers an area of 536 acres (217 ha) which contains four runways:

- Runway 10L/28R: 3,241 by 100 ft (988 by 30 m), Surface: Asphalt
- Runway 10R/28L: 3,255 by 100 ft (992 by 30 m), Surface: Asphalt
- Runway 19L/1R: 3,260 by 100 ft (994 by 30 m), Surface: Asphalt
- Runway 19R/1L: 3,350 by 100 ft (1,021 by 30 m), Surface: Asphalt

Other information:

- Runways 10R/28L and 19R/1L are lit for 24-hour operation
- There are 164 T-Hangars for aircraft storage
- The Air Traffic Control Tower is operational from 7:00am – 9:00pm
- There is extensive flight training activity at the airport.
- There are two commercial banner-towing operators at the airport.

For the 12-month period ending May 2, 2018, the airport had 117,649 aircraft operations, an average of 322 per day: 99% general aviation, <1% military, and <1% air taxi.

== Accidents and incidents ==
- On March 15, 2021, the two occupants of a Beech Bonanza aircraft that had just taken off North Perry Airport as well as a four-year-old child riding in a car nearby were killed after the plane smashed into the car which was occupied by the boy and his mother. The mother was severely injured but was later released from a local hospital. The crash was caught by a home camera which showed the plane exploded after impact.
- On September 27, 2022, tornadoes related to Hurricane Ian, damaged 15 planes, with no loss of life or injuries.
- On October 17, 2022, a single-engine Aero Adventure Aventura II plane crashed with two people on board near North Perry Airport in Pembroke Pines, Florida, killing 32-year-old student pilot Jordan Hall and 34-year-old flight instructor Antony Rolland Yen. Authorities say experimental aircraft went down at approximately 11:45 a.m. in a residential neighborhood of Miramar just south of the airport. No one on the ground was injured. Early reports indicate the plane may have been leaking fuel before it went down. An investigation is underway.

== See also ==
- List of airports in Florida
