= Sunshine Ranches, Florida =

- neighborhood
- Interactive map of Sunshine Ranches, Florida
- Coordinates: 26°2′25″N 80°19′31″W
- Country: United States
- State: Florida
- County: Broward

Area
  - Total: 4.2 sq mi (10.8 km^{2})
  - Land: 4.2 sq mi (10.8 km^{2})
  - Water: 0 sq mi (0.0 km^{2})
- Elevation: 3.3 ft (1 m)

Population (2000)
  - Total: 1,704
  - Density: 408/sq mi (157.7/km^{2})
- Time zone: UTC-5 (Eastern (EST))
  - Summer (DST): UTC-4 (EDT)
- FIPS code: 12-70025
- GNIS feature ID: 1853290

Sunshine Ranches is a former census-designated place (CDP) in Broward County, Florida, United States. The population was 1,704 at the 2000 census. It was incorporated into the town of Southwest Ranches, Florida in 2000, and now serves as a neighborhood.

== Geography ==
Sunshine Ranches is located at 26°2′25″N 80°19′31″W (26.040217, -80.325178).

According to the United States Census Bureau, the CDP has a total area of 10.8 km^{2} (4.2 sq mi), all land.

== Demographics ==
As of the census of 2000, there were 1,704 people, 551 households, and 456 families residing in the CDP. The population density was 157.8 people/km^{2} (409 people/mi^{2}). There were 575 housing units at an average density of 53.2 units/km^{2} (138 units/mi^{2}). The racial makeup of the CDP was 92.43% White (77.7% were Non-Hispanic White,) 2.76% African American, 0.06% Native American, 0.88% Asian, 1.53% from other races, and 2.35% from two or more races. Hispanic or Latino of any race were 17.78% of the population.

There were 551 households, out of which 38.3% had children under the age of 18 living with them, 72.1% were married couples living together, 8.3% had a female householder with no husband present, and 17.1% were non-families. 10.9% of all households were made up of individuals, and 2.5% had someone living alone who was 65 years of age or older. The average household size was 3.08 and the average family size was 3.34.

In the CDP, the population was spread out, with 27.1% under the age of 18, 5.1% from 18 to 24, 26.2% from 25 to 44, 30.0% from 45 to 64, and 11.6% who were 65 years of age or older. The median age was 41 years. For every 100 females, there were 94.3 males. For every 100 females age 18 and over, there were 93.8 males.

The median income for a household in the CDP was $87,307, and the median income for a family was $89,078. Males had a median income of $58,487 versus $41,768 for females. The per capita income for the CDP was $40,001. About 1.5% of families and 2.1% of the population were below the poverty line, including 3.7% of those under age 18 and 2.0% of those age 65 or over.

As of 2000, before being annexed to Southwest Ranches, English as a first language accounted for 76.22% of all residents, while Spanish as a mother tongue accounted for 22.16%, and Italian made up 1.61% of the population.
