= Green Meadow, Florida =

Green Meadow
- Neighborhood
- Location within Florida Location within the United States
- Coordinates: 26°3′12″N 80°22′0″W
- Country: United States
- State: Florida
- County: Broward

Area
  - Total: 2.1 sq mi (5.4 km^{2})
  - Land: 2.1 sq mi (5.4 km^{2})
  - Water: 0 sq mi (0.0 km^{2})

Population (2000)
  - Total: 1,874
  - Density: 897/sq mi (346.2/km^{2})
- Time zone: UTC-5 (Eastern (EST))
  - Summer (DST): UTC-4 (EDT)
- FIPS code: 12-27537

Green Meadow was a census-designated place (CDP) in Broward County, Florida, United States. The population was 1,875 at the 2000 census. It was incorporated into the town of Southwest Ranches, Florida in 2000.

== Geography ==
Green Meadow is located at 26°3′12″N 80°22′0″W (26.053367, -80.366795).

According to the United States Census Bureau, the CDP has a total area of 5.4 km^{2} (2.1 sq mi). 5.4 km^{2} (2.1 sq mi) of it is land and 0.48% is water.

== Demographics ==
As of the census of 2000, there were 1,875 people, 572 households, and 522 families residing in the CDP. The population density was 346.2 people/km^{2} (897 people/mi^{2}). There were 583 housing units at an average density of 107.7 units/km^{2} (279 units/mi^{2}). The racial makeup of the CDP was 90.66% White (73.5% were Non-Hispanic White,) 2.72% African American, 0.43% Native American, 2.77% Asian, 1.76% from other races, and 1.65% from two or more races. Hispanic or Latino of any race were 19.37% of the population.

There were 572 households, out of which 46.9% had children under the age of 18 living with them, 80.2% were married couples living together, 7.7% had a female householder with no husband present, and 8.6% were non-families. 6.5% of all households were made up of individuals, and 1.4% had someone living alone who was 65 years of age or older. The average household size was 3.28 and the average family size was 3.42.

In the CDP, the population was spread out, with 29.1% under the age of 18, 6.7% from 18 to 24, 26.6% from 25 to 44, 30.2% from 45 to 64, and 7.4% who were 65 years of age or older. The median age was 39 years. For every 100 females, there were 102.6 males. For every 100 females age 18 and over, there were 97.9 males.

The median income for a household in the CDP was $79,877, and the median income for a family was $82,830. Males had a median income of $47,132 versus $39,167 for females. The per capita income for the CDP was $33,350. None of the families and 0.1% of the population were living below the poverty line, including no under eighteens and none of those over 64.

As of 2000, before being annexed to Southwest Ranches, English as a first language accounted for 82.09% of all residents, while Spanish as a mother tongue made up 17.90% of the population.
