= Southwest Ranches, Florida =

Town in the state of Florida, United States

- Town
- Town of Southwest Ranches
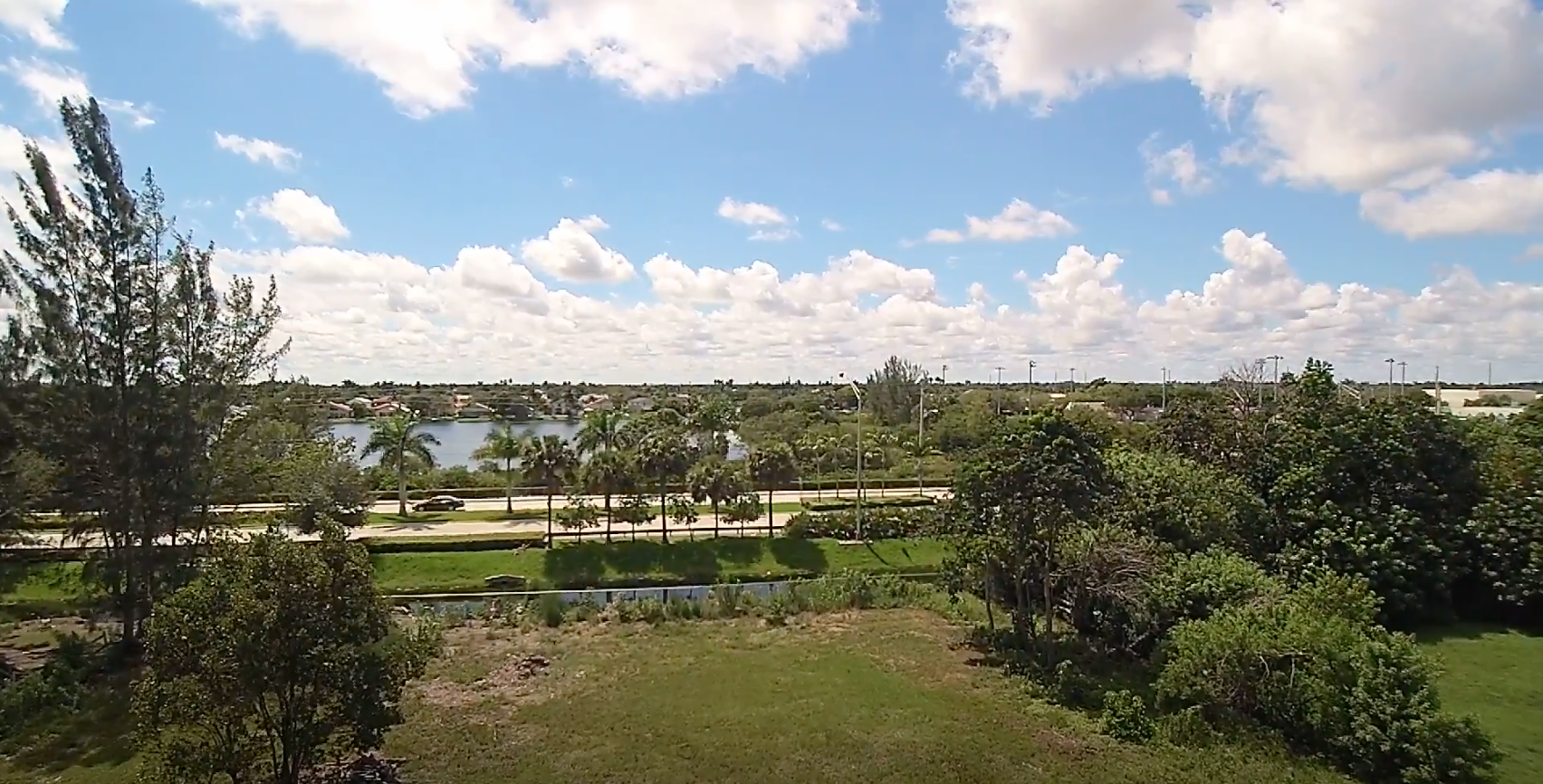
- View of Sheridan Street in Southwest Ranches

- Seal
- Mottoes: "Preserving Our Rural Lifestyle" (official) and "The pavement stops here!" (unofficial)
- Location of Southwest Ranches within Broward County
- Coordinates: 26°02′50″N 80°21′31″W
- Country: United States
- State: Florida
- County: Broward
- Incorporated: June 6, 2000

Government
  - Type: Commission-Manager
  - Mayor: Steve J. Breitkreuz (R)
  - Vice Mayor: Jim Allbritton
  - Council Member: Bob Hartmann, Gary Jablonski, and David S. Kuczenski
  - Town Administrator: Andrew “Andy” Berns
  - Town Clerk: Russell Muñiz

Area
  - Total: 13.02 sq mi (33.71 km^{2})
  - Land: 12.98 sq mi (33.61 km^{2})
  - Water: 0.042 sq mi (0.11 km^{2})
- Elevation: 7 ft (2.1 m)

Population (2020)
  - Total: 7,607
  - Density: 586.2/sq mi (226.35/km^{2})
- Time zone: UTC-5 (EST)
  - Summer (DST): UTC-4 (EDT)
- ZIP codes: 33029, 33330-33332
- Area codes: 754, 954
- FIPS code: 12-68135
- GNIS feature ID: 2407376
- Website: southwestranches.org

Southwest Ranches is a town in Broward County, Florida, United States. It is a suburban community part of the Miami metropolitan area and is located on the eastern edge of the Everglades, 15 miles (24 km) southwest of Fort Lauderdale and about 22 miles (35 km) northwest of Miami. It is unusual in that it consists of three non-contiguous areas, albeit they are in close proximity; the two largest being separated by 1,455 feet (0.443 km). It became the county's 30th incorporated place in 2000 to avoid annexation into Pembroke Pines and to preserve its semirural lifestyle. Because the area has many horse ranches and is located in the southwestern part of Broward County, residents chose "Southwest Ranches" over other potential town names.

The population at the 2020 census was 7,607. The town includes the former census-designated places of Country Estates, Green Meadow, Ivanhoe Estates, Rolling Oaks, and Sunshine Ranches (as well as subneighborhoods Landmark Ranch Estates and Sterling Ranch Estates), all of which are now Southwest Ranches neighborhoods. To support its rural-equestrian lifestyle, the town has developed many equestrian trails.

== History ==
Prior to European colonization, the Tequesta were the native people in the southeastern part of Florida for almost 2,000 years from 500 BCE to the 18th century CE when the Spanish conquered Florida. In the 1970s archeologist excavated a Tequesta burial site, with artifacts that go back to more than a thousand years, that was part of a former Everglades tree island. There is also an old Indian trading post in the town.

In 1996, Pembroke Pines proposed a bill to the Broward County Legislative Delegation to annex all the unincorporated areas between Griffin Road, Sheridan Street, Flamingo Road, and SR 25 into Pembroke Pines. Hundreds of citizens from the unincorporated area of Southwest Ranches packed the delegation hearing in November 1996 at Pembroke Pines City Hall to protest this takeover and to call for the right to form their own city. As a result of this grassroots effort, the State Legislature passed a bill in the 1997 session that called for a vote of Southwest Ranches' citizens in March 2000; they could be annexed into either Pembroke Pines or Davie, or become a new city.

Southwest Ranches Homeowners Association was an umbrella group composed of individual homeowners associations in the Southwest Ranches area. Anyone belonging to an individual homeowners association was also automatically a member of the group, with full voting rights. In 1997, its members agreed to actively promote incorporation of a new city for the area and formed a political committee to explore this option. A feasibility committee was appointed to determine if a new city would be viable. They would have to know if revenues would be adequate to cover the costs of running a city. Dr. Milan Dluhy of Florida International University was contacted and asked to complete a formal feasibility study; Dluhy had produced many such studies for groups that subsequently became successful cities. The committee also contacted Moyer and Associates, the company that provides contract services to Weston.

The feasibility committee determined that a contract city would be the best option. Contracting would allow the city access to experienced professionals without having to hire these individuals on a full-time basis. This would save taxpayers money and avoid many costly capital expenses. Moyer and Associates provided the feasibility committee and Dr. Dluhy with financial information on which to base estimates of both income and expenses. The committee also considered the figures provided by the PMG study. PMG is the company hired by Broward County to conduct a study comparing the costs of Pembroke Pines and Davie to the costs of being incorporated into a new city.

On July 3, 1999, the Southwest Ranches Homeowners Association sponsored a parade and picnic to declare the area's independence. Speakers at the event included then-Senator Howard Forman, Representative Debbie Wasserman Schultz, County Commissioner Lori Parrish, Sheriff Ken Jenne, and Weston Mayor Harry Rosen. The bill passed in 1997 authorized the vote in 2000 to determine if residents wanted to form their own city. If the vote was for a new city, a charter was to be drawn up and an election forming the city held in 2001. Leaders realized, however, that if a charter could be drawn up sooner, it could be approved in 2000 and the city formed a year earlier, which would be financially beneficial to the residents.

A charter committee was formed to draw up a charter. The committee met almost weekly during July and August 1999, and formulated a new charter, using the Weston charter as a template. A contest was held to name the town, with 122 different names submitted. A vote was held on October 12, 1999, to select one of the top five names, which Southwest Ranches won. Southwest Ranches Homeowners Association members voted to move forward and request a local bill to allow incorporation in 2000 instead of 2001, which was approved. On March 14, 2000, residents voted overwhelmingly to form a new town rather than be annexed.

The most contentious issue during charter committee meetings was whether or not to have districts. The majority of members felt that council members should be elected at large, meaning that any qualified candidate could run for a seat, no matter where that individual lived, but some felt that candidates should only be able to run if they lived in one of four districts. When the election to approve the charter was held on June 6, 2000, the issue was put to a vote, and the majority of voters selected districts. Council members were elected on July 25, 2000, and the town was officially established.

The area is primarily residential, with most lots consisting of 1 acre (0.40 ha) or more. Some are small farms and equestrian ranches. The town has laws that keep homes from being built on lots less than an acre. To conserve the town's rural lifestyle, the laws also generally prevent streetlights and sidewalks from being constructed.

== Demographics ==
Historical population
Census	Pop.	Note	%±
2010	7,345		—
2020	7,607		3.6%
U.S. Decennial Census

Southwest Ranches was listed as a town in the 2010 U.S. census formed out of all of the deleted Green Meadow, Ivanhoe Estates, and Rolling Oaks CDPs, the predominant part of the deleted Country Estates and Sunshine Ranches CDPs, area detached from the cities of Cooper City and Pembroke Pines, and additional area.

=== Racial and ethnic composition ===
Southwest Ranches town, Florida – Racial and ethnic composition Note: the US Census treats Hispanic/Latino as an ethnic category. This table excludes Latinos from the racial categories and assigns them to a separate category. Hispanics/Latinos may be of any race.
Race / Ethnicity (NH = Non-Hispanic)	Pop 2010	Pop 2020	% 2010	% 2020
White alone (NH)	4,143	3,380	56.41%	44.43%
Black or African American alone (NH)	352	343	4.79%	4.51%
Native American or Alaska Native alone (NH)	36	12	0.49%	0.16%
Asian alone (NH)	202	291	2.75%	3.83%
Native Hawaiian or Pacific Islander alone (NH)	1	0	0.01%	0.00%
Other race alone (NH)	31	49	0.42%	0.64%
Mixed race or Multiracial (NH)	135	292	1.84%	3.84%
Hispanic or Latino (any race)	2,445	3,240	33.29%	42.59%
Total	7,345	7,607	100.00%	100.00%

=== 2020 census ===
As of the 2020 census, Southwest Ranches had a population of 7,607. The median age was 46.0 years. 19.8% of residents were under the age of 18 and 18.3% of residents were 65 years of age or older. For every 100 females there were 98.5 males, and for every 100 females age 18 and over there were 97.0 males age 18 and over.

99.6% of residents lived in urban areas, while 0.4% lived in rural areas.

There were 2,364 households in Southwest Ranches, of which 37.5% had children under the age of 18 living in them. Of all households, 69.5% were married-couple households, 12.7% were households with a male householder and no spouse or partner present, and 13.0% were households with a female householder and no spouse or partner present. About 9.7% of all households were made up of individuals and 4.5% had someone living alone who was 65 years of age or older.

There were 2,480 housing units, of which 4.7% were vacant. The homeowner vacancy rate was 1.5% and the rental vacancy rate was 3.9%.

In the 2020 American Community Survey, there were 1,730 families in the town.

=== 2010 census ===
As of the 2010 United States census, there were 7,345 people, 2,210 households, and 1,844 families residing in the town.

=== 2000 census ===
As of 2000, before being annexed to Southwest Ranches, those who spoke only English accounted for 82.09% of Green Meadow residents, while those who spoke Spanish at home made up 17.90% of the population. In the Rolling Oaks neighborhood, those who spoke only English accounted for 70.42% of all residents, while Spanish speakers were 29.57% of the population. In the Country Estates neighborhood, English-only speakers were 78.46% of the population while Spanish speakers made up 21.53% of the population. In the Sunshine Ranches neighborhood, 76.22% of residents spoke only English while 22.16% spoke Spanish 1.61% spoke Italian.

== Economy ==
The Florida Department of Corrections operates the Region IV Correctional Facility Office on the grounds of Broward Correctional Institution in the former Country Estates CDP and in Southwest Ranches. The Broward prison formerly housed the female death row, which was moved to the Lowell Correctional Institution in February 2003.

== Parks and recreation ==
To support its rural-equestrian lifestyle, the town has developed miles of multiuse trails. People can often be seen riding horses or bicycles or walking the trails that spread throughout the town. Since incorporation, the town has also acquired seven open-space parks, only one of which has been developed so far. This park includes a schooling ring, a show ring, and the Equestrian Oasis, an art installation primarily used to provide drinking water for horses.

== Government ==
From the time of its founding until 2012, the town conducted its business from a modular office at the South Broward Drainage District headquarters. In 2012, the town, under the leadership of Vice Mayor Doug McKay, renovated a former church to create Southwest Ranches' first permanent town hall. Police and emergency services are provided by the nearby town of Davie.

Southwest Ranches' charter defines the governing body as a council with one mayor and four council members. The mayor and the council members are elected at large from the electorate of the town, but the council members represent districts in which they must reside. The mayoral role is largely ceremonial with no more power than any council member. Other charter positions serving Southwest Ranches include the town administrator, financial administrator, and town clerk.

The town's first council consisted of Mayor Mecca Fink, Vice Mayor Johnny Dollar, Forrest Blanton, Freddy Fisikelli, and Astor Knight.

== Education ==
Southwest Ranches is served by Broward County Public Schools.

- Hawkes Bluff Elementary School
- Silver Trail Middle School
- West Broward High School

== Notable people ==
- River Alexander, actor
- Ricou Browning, actor and film producer
- Gisele Bündchen, Brazilian model
- Vernon Carey, American football player
- Miss Cleo, television psychic
- Daunte Culpepper, American football player
- Karlos Dansby, American football player
- Vontae Davis, American football player
- T. J. Duke, racing driver
- Juan Gabriel, Mexican singer, songwriter, and actor
- Nicolas Hansen, soccer player
- Udonis Haslem, basketball player
- Tyreek Hill, American football player
- Dwayne Johnson, actor and former professional wrestler
- Sean Kingston, rapper and singer
- Raw Leiba, actor and film producer
- Krishna Maharaj, British businessman and convicted murderer
- Trippie Redd, rapper
- Rick Ross, rapper and record executive
- Reggie Wayne, American football player
- Uncle Louie, American talent manager, music producer, and actor

== In media ==
In April 2019, the WSVN show Deco Drive featured a Southwest Ranches farm owned by Uncle Louie.
