= Cooper City, Florida =

- City
- City of Cooper City
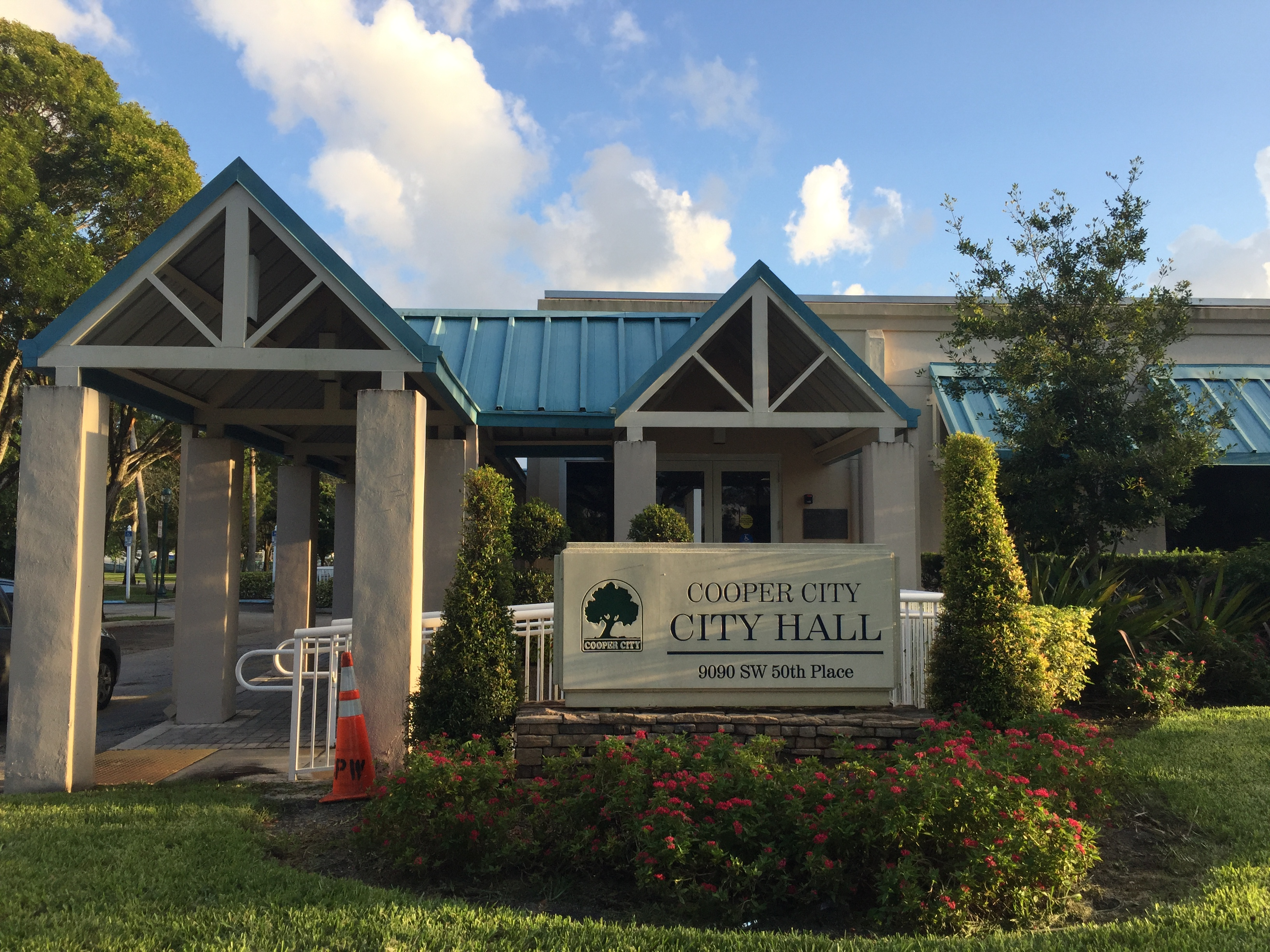
- Cooper City's City Hall

- Flag
- Motto: "Someplace Special"
- Coordinates: 26°02′26″N 80°16′02″W
- Country: United States
- State: Florida
- County: Broward
- Incorporated: June 20, 1959

Government
  - Type: Commission-Manager

Area
  - City: 8.34 sq mi (21.60 km^{2})
  - Land: 8.04 sq mi (20.82 km^{2})
  - Water: 0.30 sq mi (0.78 km^{2}) 3.63%
- Elevation: 7 ft (2.1 m)

Population (2020)
  - City: 34,401
  - Density: 4,279.7/sq mi (1,652.42/km^{2})
  - Metro: 6,166,488
- Time zone: UTC-5 (Eastern (EST))
  - Summer (DST): UTC-4 (EDT)
- ZIP code: 33328-33330, 33026
- Area codes: 954, 754
- FIPS code: 12-14125
- GNIS feature ID: 2404124
- Website: www.coopercityfl.org

Cooper City is a city in Broward County, Florida, United States. The city is named for Morris Cooper, who founded the community in 1959. It's part of the Miami metropolitan area. The city's population was 34,401 at the 2020 census.

In 2006, Cooper City expanded with the annexation of the Waldrep Dairy Farm.

== Geography ==
Cooper City is bounded by Davie to the north, Pembroke Pines to the south, both Hollywood and Davie to the east, and Southwest Ranches to the west.

According to the United States Census Bureau, the city has a total area of 8.3 square miles (21.6 km^{2}), of which 8.0 square miles (20.8 km^{2}) is land and 0.31 square miles (0.8 km^{2}) is water (3.63%).

=== Climate ===
Cooper City has a tropical climate, similar to the climate found in much of the Caribbean. It is part of the only region in the 48 contiguous states that falls under that category. More specifically, it generally has a tropical rainforest climate (Köppen climate classification: Af), bordering a tropical monsoon climate (Köppen climate classification: Am).

== Demographics ==
=== Racial and ethnic composition ===
Historical demographics	2020	2010	2000	1990	1980
White (non-Hispanic)	50.5%	65.1%	75.7%	84.7%	93.5%
Hispanic or Latino	31.8%	22.8%	15.6%	10.7%	5.1%
Black or African American (non-Hispanic)	5.5%	4.5%	3.0%	1.9%	0.3%
Asian and Pacific Islander (non-Hispanic)	7.5%	5.5%	4.1%	2.6%	1.1%
Native American (non-Hispanic)	0.2%	0.2%	0.1%	0.1%	1.1%
Some other race (non-Hispanic)	0.8%	0.3%	0.4%	< 0.1%	1.1%
Two or more races (non-Hispanic)	3.8%	1.5%	1.1%	N/A	N/A
Population	34,401	28,547	27,939	20,791	10,140

Cooper City racial composition (Hispanics excluded from racial categories) (NH = Non-Hispanic)
Race	Pop 2010	Pop 2020	% 2010	% 2020
White (NH)	18,577	17,364	65.08%	50.48%
Black or African American (NH)	1,290	1,879	4.52%	5.46%
Native American or Alaska Native (NH)	60	58	0.21%	0.17%
Asian (NH)	1,556	2,579	5.45%	7.50%
Pacific Islander or Native Hawaiian (NH)	7	11	0.02%	0.03%
Some other race (NH)	96	269	0.34%	0.78%
Two or more races/Multiracial (NH)	441	1,301	1.54%	3.78%
Hispanic or Latino (any race)	6,520	10,940	22.84%	31.80%
Total	28,547	34,401	100.00%	100.00%

Historical population
Census	Pop.	Note	%±
1960	550		—
1970	2,535		360.9%
1980	10,140		300.0%
1990	20,791		105.0%
2000	27,939		34.4%
2010	28,547		2.2%
2020	34,401		20.5%
U.S. Decennial Census

=== 2020 census ===
As of the 2020 census, Cooper City had a population of 34,401. The median age was 40.6 years. 25.3% of residents were under the age of 18 and 14.3% of residents were 65 years of age or older. For every 100 females there were 92.1 males, and for every 100 females age 18 and over there were 89.1 males age 18 and over.

100.0% of residents lived in urban areas, while 0.0% lived in rural areas.

There were 11,410 households in Cooper City, of which 44.0% had children under the age of 18 living in them. Of all households, 63.9% were married-couple households, 10.0% were households with a male householder and no spouse or partner present, and 21.2% were households with a female householder and no spouse or partner present. About 13.0% of all households were made up of individuals and 5.8% had someone living alone who was 65 years of age or older.

There were 11,668 housing units, of which 2.2% were vacant. The homeowner vacancy rate was 0.4% and the rental vacancy rate was 4.6%.

Racial composition as of the 2020 census
Race	Number	Percent
White	20,414	59.3%
Black or African American	2,031	5.9%
American Indian and Alaska Native	99	0.3%
Asian	2,627	7.6%
Native Hawaiian and Other Pacific Islander	17	0.0%
Some other race	1,883	5.5%
Two or more races	7,330	21.3%
Hispanic or Latino (of any race)	10,940	31.8%

=== 2010 census ===
As of the 2010 United States census, there were 28,547 people, 9,321 households, and 7,689 families residing in the city.

=== 2000 census ===
In 2000, 51.5% had children under the age of 18 living with them, 70.8% were married couples living together, 11.9% had a female householder with no spouse present, and 14.2% were non-families. 10.8% of all households were made up of individuals, and 3.1% had someone living alone who was 65 years of age or older. The average household size was 3.06 and the average family size was 3.30.

In 2000, the city the population was spread out, with 31.3% under the age of 18, 6.3% from 18 to 24, 30.2% from 25 to 44, 25.5% from 45 to 64, and 6.7% who were 65 years of age or older. The median age was 37 years. For every 100 females, there were 94.1 males. For every 100 females age 18 and over, there were 88.8 males.

In 2000, the median income for a household in the city was $75,166, and the median income for a family was $78,172. Males had a median income of $51,931 versus $33,788 for females. The per capita income for the city was $27,474. About 2.9% of families and 3.2% of the population were below the poverty line, including 3.2% of those under age 18 and 4.7% of those age 65 or over.

As of 2000, English was spoken as a first language by 78.55% of the population, while Spanish was spoken by 15.08%, and Hebrew speakers made up 1.25% of all residents. Other mother tongues included languages such as both French and Malayalam making up 0.75% of residents, as well as Italian being at 0.69%, while Chinese was at 0.59%.

As of 2000, Cooper City had the sixty-fifth highest percentage of Cuban residents in the US, at 5.29% of the city's population (tied with West Palm Beach), and it had the ninety-second highest percentage of Colombian residents in the US, which made up 1.78% of all residents (tied with Pinecrest and South Bound Brook, New Jersey).

== Education ==
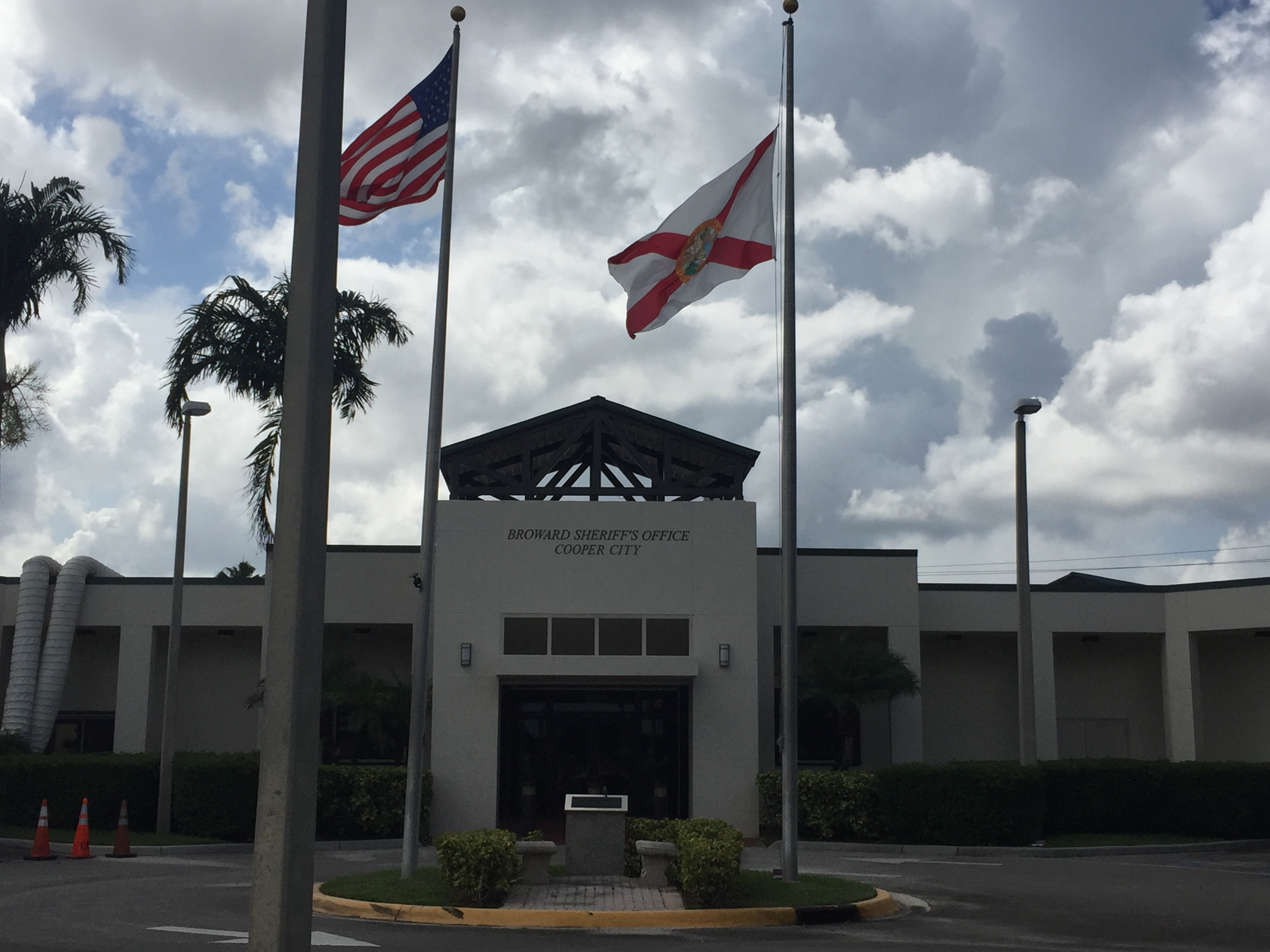
Sheriff's office

=== Public schools ===
Broward County Public Schools operates public schools.

Elementary schools

- Cooper City Elementary has attained an "A" rating for 2018/2019.
- Embassy Creek Elementary is an elementary school located in Cooper City that teaches grades K–5. The school is a member of the Broward School District. It is an "A" school and is currently ranked number 36 out of about 3000 schools in the state of Florida for 2011. It is named after its nearby developments of Embassy Lakes and Rock Creek.
- Griffin Elementary School is an elementary school located in Cooper City which teaches grades K–5. The school has also attained an "A" rating for 2018/2019.
- Elementary schools in other municipalities serving sections of Cooper City: Hawkes Bluff Elementary School in Davie.

Middle schools

- Pioneer Middle School is a middle school located in Cooper City that teaches grades 6–8. Pioneer Middle School was rated the number 2 middle school in Broward County, and number 55 in the State out of 583 schools in the state of Florida for 2011. The school has maintained an "A" rating since the Florida Department of Education began grading schools in the late 1990s.
- Some of the western part of the city is instead zoned to Silver Trail Middle School in Pembroke Pines.

High school

- Cooper City High School has attained an "A" rating for 2020/2021. It is currently ranked among the top ten percent schools in America. It is the number 46 high school in Florida and one of the top schools in Broward County. It serves students from 9–12. Cooper City High offers more than twenty-two AP classes. The AP participation in Cooper City is 48%, which makes it one of the highest AP participation schools in Broward county.
- Some areas are jointly zoned to Cooper City High and West Broward High School in Pembroke Pines.

=== Private schools ===
- Potential Christian Academy (formerly Flamingo Road Christian Academy) is the school ministry of Potential Church. Established in 1983 as a preschool program, PCA has grown to include Pre-K–8th grade. On October 10, 2010, the school changed its name to Potential Christian Academy from Flamingo Road Christian Academy.
- Franklin Academy is a public charter school serving students in kindergarten through eighth grade.
- Nur-ul Islam Academy is a private Islamic school located in Cooper City, founded in 1996. It serves students from Pre-K–12th grade.
- First Baptist Academy is a ministry of First Baptist Church of Southwest Broward and is located in Cooper City. It was started in 2010, and serves grades K4–12th. First Baptist Academy is accredited through Faccs.

== Sports ==
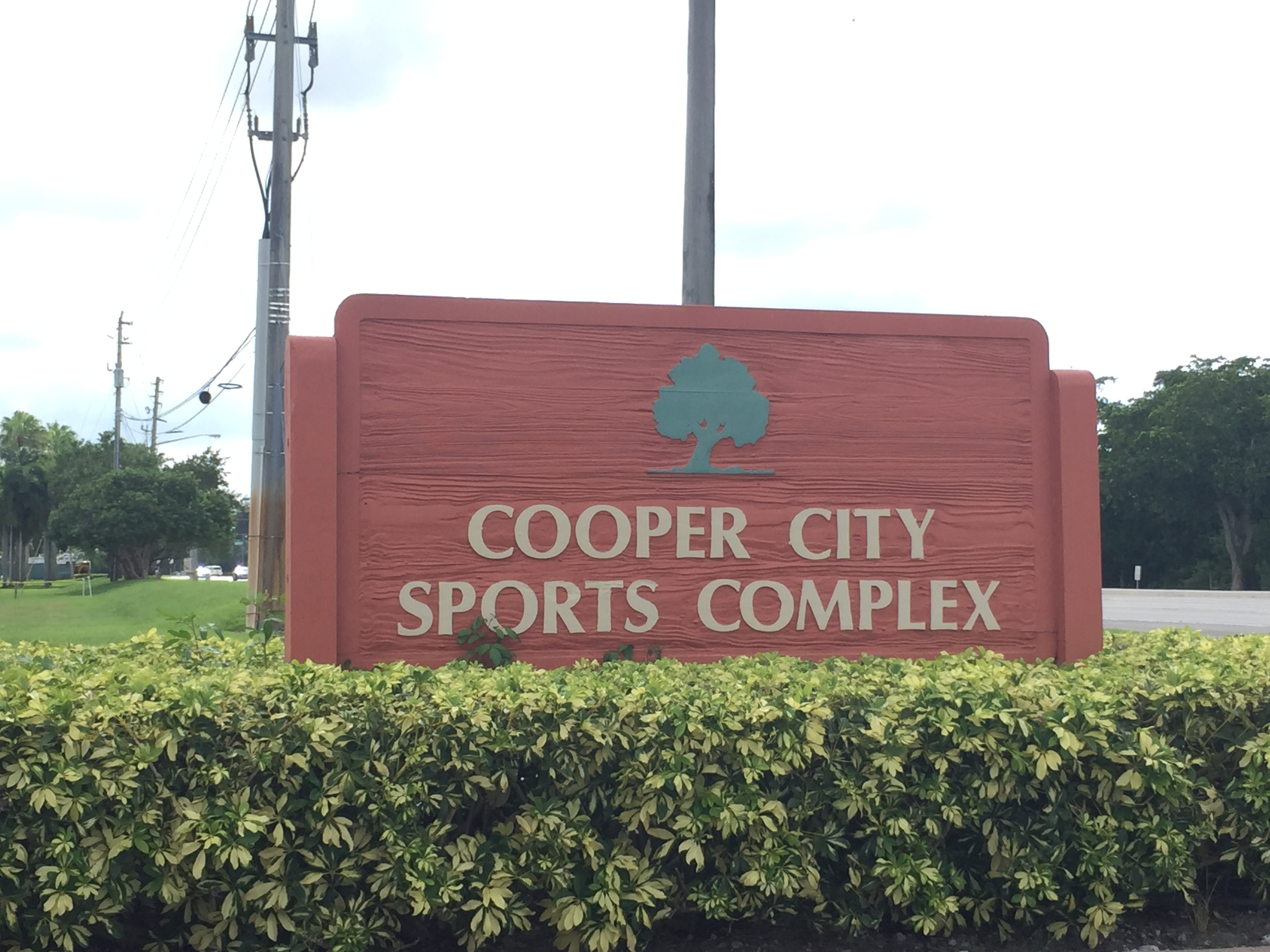
Cooper City Sports Park

Brian Piccolo Park in Cooper City is the location of a cricket grounds, and in 2004, played host to first-class cricket when the United States cricket team played Canada in the ICC Intercontinental Cup. It also served as the home ground for the Florida Thunder Pro Cricket team in 2004. The park is also home to one of the few cycling tracks in South Florida. The park also encompasses a skateboard park. There are three other parks in Cooper City, Bill Lips Park, Cooper City Sports Complex, and Flamingo West Park.

Cooper City is also the birthplace of Troy State defensive end Ken Wagner, who was a part of their National Championship team in the late 1980s.

Former Miami Dolphins place kicker Olindo Mare graduated from Cooper City High School in 1991.

== Notable people ==
- Nick Lucena, retired professional beach volleyball player
- Eric Hosmer, former MLB first baseman for the Kansas City Royals, San Diego Padres, Boston Red Sox, and Chicago Cubs
- Skai Moore, former NFL American football linebacker for the Indianapolis Colts
- Rick Shaw, radio disc jockey (WQAM )

== Sister city ==
- Killarney, Ireland
