= House of Highlights =

Multi-media social network

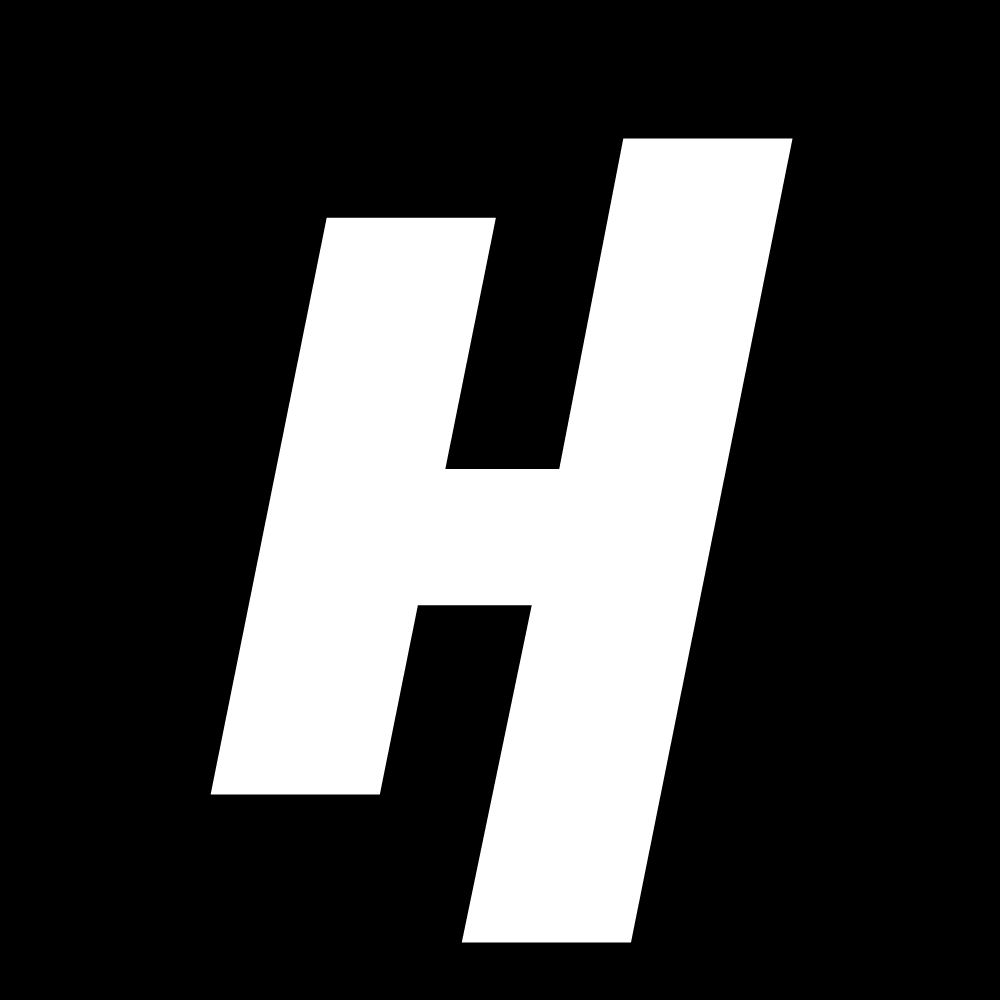
- Type: Subsidiary
- Industry: Sports media; Online video
- Founded: 2014; 12 years ago
- Founder: Omar Raja
- Headquarters: New York City
- Parent: Bleacher Report
- Website: Official website

House of Highlights (often abbreviated as HoH) is a social media network that focuses on the distribution of videos online. HoH is headquartered in New York City within Bleacher Report's office. Known primarily for popular sport highlights, HoH has positioned itself as a distributor in the sport media industry, but also in the short video clip industry.

Since being acquired by Bleacher Report in December 2016, House of Highlights has expanded into a multi-platform media business.

== History ==
=== Founding: 2014–2016 ===
The company was founded by Omar Raja in his college dorm room at the University of Central Florida in the summer of 2014. Raja started an Instagram account called "The Highlight Factory", but eventually changed the name to "House of Highlights".

=== Bleacher Report acquisition: 2015–present ===
In July 2015, Bleacher Report vice president Doug Bernstein expressed interest in acquiring HoH; at the time, HoH had around 500,000 followers on Instagram. Bleacher Report officially acquired House of Highlights in December 2016. Esquire reported that HoH would garner around 700 million video views per month during the NBA season, with 10,000 new followers daily. In 2016, House of Highlights partnered with companies such as Lexus, Nike, Jordan Brand, Adidas, and Netflix.

In January 2018, HoH created its own YouTube channel. In October, the company partnered with Twitter to launch House of Highlights LIVE, a live show featuring athletes and entertainers. On the channel, HoH often posts short-form content, with longer videos centering on game or player-specific highlight compilations.

In April 2019, Twitter ordered a second season of House of Highlights LIVE The company conducted its first basketball camp in 2019, which was free for 150 kids. The following year House of Highlights held its second basketball camp for young athletes. According to Bleacher Report, House of Highlights accounted for 10% of its total revenue as of June 2019.

In early 2020, it was announced that Raja would be leaving House of Highlights at the end of his contract and join ESPN. Later, in 2020, HoH launched HoH Showdown. The first HoH Showdown brought together Kris London, Jesser, Tristan Jass, and MMG for a closest-to-the-pin golf challenge with a USD$100,000 prize. The event earned 200,000 concurrent viewers and 576,000 total views on YouTube.

== Recognition ==
Shorty Awards

- 2019 "Instagram Presence" - Nomination

Cynopsis Sports Media Awards

- 2018 "Use of Instagram" - Winner
- 2020 "Use of Instagram" - Finalist

Clios Sports Award

- Silver for Social Media - Multi-Platform Campaign
