= Charles W. Flanagan High School =

Public high school in Pembroke Pines, Florida, United States

Coordinates: 26.0205°N 80.3224°W

Location
- 12800 Taft Street; Pembroke Pines, Florida 33028; United States

Information
- School type: Public
- Established: 1996
- Superintendent: Dr. Peter B. Licata
- Principal: Brad Fatout
- Teaching staff: 102.75 (FTE)
- Grades: 9-12
- Enrollment: 2,213 (2024-2025)
- Student to teacher ratio: 22.68
- Colors: Black; White; Hunter Green
- School District: Broward County Public Schools
- Administrative District Area: South Area
- Innovation Zone: Flanagan
- Website: www.browardschools.com/flanagan

Charles W. Flanagan High School is a public high school in Pembroke Pines, Florida, United States. The school's mascot is a falcon.

== History ==
The school was named after Charles W. Flanagan, a former Pembroke Pines mayor. The school opened in 1996, located north of Walter C. Young Middle School.

== Schedule ==
The school follows a block schedule, with each class being 92 minutes each. The time school starts for students is 7:40 a.m., and ends at 2:40 p.m.

== Demographics ==
As of the 2023–24 school year, there were 2,213 students enrolled.

== Notable alumni ==
- Nick Turnbull, Former NFL player for Atlanta Falcons, Chicago Bears, Cincinnati Bengals.
- Bridget Carey, CNET Senior Editor
- Cary Williams, attended the school for two years - Cornerback, Tennessee Titans, Baltimore Ravensall, Philadelphia Eagles, Seattle Seahawks
- Conroy Black, attended the school for two years - Cornerback, Oakland Raiders, Detroit Lions, Kansas City Chiefs. Named one of the fastest football players in the nation on the annual Heisman Pundit list.
- Faion Hicks, former University of Wisconsin Cornerback, former NFL player for the Denver Broncos
- Conceited, battle rapper and Wild 'N Out cast member
- J. D. Martinez, baseball outfielder
- Mike Napoli, baseball first baseman
- Jim Alers, Professional Mixed Martial Arts fighter for the Ultimate Fighting Championship
- Alia Atkinson, Olympic swimmer representing Jamaica and two time world record holder.
- Robert Love, author and Director of Engineering at Google
- Riley Reid, (Real name Ashley Mathews, Class of 2009) pornographic actress
- Devin Bush, NFL linebacker for the Cleveland Browns, first round pick in the 2019 NFL draft
- Josh Metellus, football player for the Minnesota Vikings
- Stanford Samuels III, former NFL football player
- Lil Pump, rapper
- Mark Vientos, baseball player
- Jahcour Pearson, professional football player for the St. Louis Battlehawks
