= 1994 Miami Dolphins season =

29th season in franchise history

- Owner: Wayne Huizenga
- Head coach: Don Shula
- Offensive coordinator: Gary Stevens
- Defensive coordinator: Tom Olivadotti
- Home stadium: Joe Robbie Stadium

Results
- Record: 10–6
- Division place: 1st AFC East
- Playoffs: Won Wild Card Playoffs (vs. Chiefs) 27–17; Lost Divisional Playoffs (at Chargers) 21–22
- Pro Bowlers: 5: QB Dan Marino; WR Irving Fryar; LT Richmond Webb; G Keith Sims; LB Bryan Cox

The 1994 Miami Dolphins season was the franchise's 29th season of existence and 25th in the National Football League (NFL). On March 23, the NFL approved the transfer of majority interest in the team from the Robbie family to Wayne Huizenga. The team's playoff win on New Year's Eve 1994 vs. Kansas City is now famous as the last NFL game that Joe Montana ever played, as the superstar QB retired in the off-season.

== Offseason ==
Additions	Subtractions
QB Bernie Kosar (Cowboys)	QB Scott Mitchell (Lions)
SS Tyrone Braxton (Broncos)	WR Tony Martin (Chargers)
T Tim Irwin (Vikings)	SS Jarvis Williams (Giants)
RB Cleveland Gary (Rams)	C Jeff Uhlenhake (Saints)
FS Gene Atkins (Saints)	QB Hugh Millen (Broncos)
	T Mark Dennis (Bengals)
	QB Steve DeBerg (retired)
	LB John Offerdahl (retired)

=== NFL draft ===
1994 Miami Dolphins draft
Round	Pick	Player	Position	College	Notes
1	20	Tim Bowens *	Defensive tackle	Ole Miss	
2	54	Aubrey Beavers	Linebacker	Oklahoma	
2	60	Tim Ruddy *	Center	Notre Dame	
4	112	Ronnie Woolfork	Linebacker	Colorado	
5	147	William Gaines	Defensive tackle	Florida	
6	177	Brant Boyer	Linebacker	Arizona	
7	214	Sean Hill	Defensive back	Montana State	
Made roster * Made at least one Pro Bowl during career

=== Undrafted free agents ===
1994 undrafted free agent of note
Player	Position	College
Calvin Jackson	Defensive back	Auburn

== Staff ==
1994 Miami Dolphins staff
Front office: President – Tim Robbie; Executive vice president/general manager – Eddie Jones; Assistant general manager – Bryan Wiedmeier; Director of player personnel – Tom Heckert, Sr.; Director of college scouting – Tom Braatz; Staff assistant – Joel Collier; Head coaches: Head coach – Don Shula; Offensive coaches: Offense/quarterbacks – Gary Stevens; Offensive backs – Tony Nathan; Wide receivers – Larry Seiple; Assistant offensive line/tight ends – Rich McGeorge; Assistant head coach/offensive line – John Sandusky	Defensive coaches: Defense – Tom Olivadotti; Defensive line – Joe Greene; Linebackers – George Hill; Defensive backs – Mel Phillips; Special teams coaches: Special teams – Mike Westhoff; Strength and conditioning: Strength – John Gamble; Conditioning – Junior Wade

== Roster ==
1994 Miami Dolphins roster
Quarterbacks (QB): 19 Bernie Kosar; 13 Dan Marino; 14 Doug Pederson; Running backs (RB): 44 Aaron Craver; 32 Cleveland Gary; 30 Bernie Parmalee; 22 James Saxon FB; 40 Irving Spikes KR; 49 Robert Wilson FB; Wide receivers (WR): 80 Irving Fryar; 82 Mark Ingram; 81 O. J. McDuffie; 83 Scott Miller PR; 87 Mike Williams; Tight ends (TE): 84 Greg Baty LS; 88 Keith Jackson; 85 Ronnie Williams	Offensive linemen (OL): 77 Kevin Brothen C/G; 65 Jeff Dellenbach C; 62 Chris Gray G; 73 Ron Heller T; 76 Tim Irwin T; 67 Jeff Novak G/T; 61 Tim Ruddy C; 69 Keith Sims G; 78 Richmond Webb T; 60 Bert Weidner G; Defensive linemen (DL): 95 Tim Bowens DT; 68 Willie Broughton DT; 90 Marco Coleman DE; 91 Jeff Cross DE; 93 William Gaines DT; 97 Tyoka Jackson DE; 99 Chuck Klingbeil DT; 94 Craig Veasey DT; 79 Larry Webster DE/DT	Linebackers (LB): 53 Aubrey Beavers OLB; 52 Brant Boyer MLB; 51 Bryan Cox MLB; 57 Dion Foxx OLB; 50 Dwight Hollier OLB; 58 Jesse Solomon MLB; Defensive backs (DB): 28 Gene Atkins FS; 34 Tyrone Braxton SS; 37 J. B. Brown CB; 42 Chris Green FS; 31 Sean Hill CB/S; 20 Muhammad Oliver CB; 29 Frankie Smith CB; 35 Michael Stewart SS; 23 Troy Vincent CB; Special teams (ST): 17 John Kidd P; 10 Pete Stoyanovich K	Practice squad: 98 Mark Caesar DT; 59 DeWayne Dotson LB; 38 Calvin Jackson CB (IR); 15 Demeris Johnson WR; 24 Pat Johnson S; 33 Dexter Seigler CB; Reserve: 54 Chuck Bullough LB (IR); 41 Keith Byars FB (IR); 64 Houston Hoover G (IR); 43 Terry Kirby RB (IR); 47 Darrell Malone CB (IR); 55 Chris Singleton LB (IR); Rookies in italics 53 active, 7 reserve, 5 practice squad

== Regular season ==
=== Schedule ===
Week	Date	Opponent	Result	Record	Venue	Attendance
1	September 4	**New England Patriots**	**W** 39–35	1–0	Joe Robbie Stadium	71,023
2	September 11	at Green Bay Packers	**W** 24–14	2–0	Milwaukee County Stadium	55,011
3	September 18	**New York Jets**	**W** 28–14	3–0	Joe Robbie Stadium	68,977
4	September 25	at Minnesota Vikings	**L** 35–38	3–1	Hubert H. Humphrey Metrodome	64,035
5	October 2	at Cincinnati Bengals	**W** 23–7	4–1	Riverfront Stadium	55,056
6	October 9	at **Buffalo Bills**	**L** 11–21	4–2	Rich Stadium	79,491
7	October 16	Los Angeles Raiders	**W** 20–17 (OT)	5–2	Joe Robbie Stadium	70,112
8	Bye					
9	October 30	at **New England Patriots**	**W** 23–3	6–2	Foxboro Stadium	59,167
10	November 6	**Indianapolis Colts**	**W** 22–21	7–2	Joe Robbie Stadium	71,158
11	November 13	Chicago Bears	**L** 14–17	7–3	Joe Robbie Stadium	64,871
12	November 20	at Pittsburgh Steelers	**L** 13–16 (OT)	7–4	Three Rivers Stadium	59,148
13	November 27	at **New York Jets**	**W** 28–24	8–4	Giants Stadium	75,606
14	December 4	**Buffalo Bills**	**L** 31–42	8–5	Joe Robbie Stadium	69,538
15	December 12	Kansas City Chiefs	**W** 45–28	9–5	Joe Robbie Stadium	71,578
16	December 18	at **Indianapolis Colts**	**L** 6–10	9–6	RCA Dome	58,867
17	December 25	Detroit Lions	**W** 27–20	10–6	Joe Robbie Stadium	70,980
Note: Intra-division opponents are in **bold** text.

=== Game summaries ===
==== Week 1 vs New England Patriots ====
Team	1	2	3	4	Total
Patriots	7	7	14	7	35
• Dolphins	0	10	15	14	39

- Date: September 4
- Location: Joe Robbie Stadium
- Game start: 4:00 p.m. EST
- Game attendance: 71,023
- Game weather: 83 °F (28 °C); wind 12 mph (19 km/h)
- Referee: Gordon McCarter
- TV announcers (NBC): Jim Lampley and Todd Christensen

Scoring summary
Q1	NE	Turner 1 yard run (Bahr kick)	NE 7–0
Q2	MIA	Ingram 64 yard pass from Marino (Stoyanovich kick)	Tie 7–7
Q2	NE	Coates 16 yard pass from Bledsoe (Bahr kick)	NE 14–7
Q2	MIA	Stoyanovich 42 yard field goal	NE 14–10
Q3	NE	Coates 63 yard pass from Bledsoe (Bahr kick)	NE 21–10
Q3	MIA	Jackson 26 yard pass from Marino (Kirby run)	NE 21–18
Q3	NE	Timpson 5 yard pass from Bledsoe (Bahr kick)	NE 28–18
Q3	MIA	Fryar 54 yard pass from Marino (Stoyanovich kick)	NE 28–25
Q4	MIA	Fryar 50 yard pass from Marino (Stoyanovich kick)	MIA 32–28
Q4	NE	Crittenden 23 yard pass from Bledsoe (Bahr kick)	NE 35–32
Q4	MIA	Fryar 35 yard pass from Mairno (Stoyanovich kick)	MIA 39–35

Both teams debuted new owners in Wayne Huizenga of the Dolphins and Robert Kraft of the Patriots. The game marked the return of Dan Marino after missing most of 1993 with a torn achilles tendon. The new-look Patriots took a 14–10 halftime lead, then in the third quarter Drew Bledsoe lobbed a 40-yard bomb caught by Ben Coates which he took in for a 63-yard touchdown. Marino and Bledsoe passed for eight touchdowns combined, and with the Patriots leading 35–32 Marino, on 4th and 5, launched a 35-yard touchdown strike to former Patriot Irving Fryar. The Dolphins held off New England's last-minute rally for the 39–35 win.

==== Week 2 at Green Bay Packers ====
Marino threw two touchdown passes during his second straight win of the season as the Dolphins, playing in Milwaukee, raced to a 24–0 lead after three quarters. Brett Favre managed two touchdowns but it wasn't enough to prevent a 24–14 Dolphins win.

==== Week 3 ====
Marino's third straight win came at home against the Jets as he threw two touchdowns while three Dolphins backs led by Terry Kirby rushed for 155 yards and touchdowns by Kirby and Bernie Parmalee. Boomer Esiason had two touchdowns but was intercepted four times as the Dolphins won 28–14.

==== Week 4 ====
The Dolphins' winning streak came to a halt at the Hubert H. Humphrey Metrodome as Warren Moon lit up the Dolphins defense with three first-half touchdowns and a 28–0 Vikings lead. But the Dolphins began clawing back and in the fourth three Marino touchdowns and Bernie Parmalee's rushing score tied the game. The Vikings then added another touchdown while ex-Dolphin Fuad Reveiz booted a kick that bounced off a Dolphin and thus could be recovered by the Vikings; it led to a 38-yard field goal, enough cushion to neutralize a late Keith Byars touchdown run, ensuing onside kick, and a 38–35 Vikings win.

==== Week 5 ====
Dubbed the “Shula Bowl”, it marked the first time in NFL history that a head coaching matchup featured father against son. Don Shula’s Miami Dolphins defeated David Shula’s Cincinnati Bengals by a 23-7 mark, to get back on track at Riverfront Stadium. After David Klingler delivered a 51-yard touchdown to Darnay Scott the Dolphins picked him off three times while rushing for 141 yards to go with 204 Marino passing yards (89 of them to Irving Fryar) and two touchdowns.

==== Week 6 ====
Persistent wind limited Marino and Jim Kelly to just 342 combined yards, a Marino touchdown to O.J. McDuffie, and a Kelly interception. Five Bills players led by Thurman Thomas rushed for 214 yards and two scores as the Bills beat Miami (21–11) for the 14th time in the two clubs' last 17 meetings.

==== Week 7 ====
Jeff Hostetler was replaced for a series by backup Vince Evans as the Raiders, despite only 227 yards of offense, forced three Miami turnovers and led 17-10 in the fourth before Keith Byars caught the tying touchdown. The Dolphins won 20-17 on Pete Stoyanovich's 29-yard field goal in overtime.

==== Week 9 ====
The offensive fireworks of Week One were not repeated as Dan Marino was intercepted twice but managed 198 yards and a touchdown while Bernie Parmalee accounted for almost all of Miami's 140 rushing yards and Keith Byars ran in a pair of scores. Drew Bledsoe was intercepted three times as the Dolphins won 23-3.

==== Week 10 ====
The Colts entered Joe Robbie Stadium beginning to build some momentum for the future, having won three of their previous five games. The Colts clawed to a 14–6 lead after three quarters but then the Dolphins began storming back on Irving Spikes' touchdown run marred by a missed two-point conversion. The Dolphins got the ball back but Marino was picked off by Ray Buchanan and he ran in a 28-yard touchdown, but despite this setback Marino whipped the Dolphins downfield and fired a 28-yard score to O.J. McDuffie, then the Dolphins got the ball back and Pete Stoyanovich's field goal finished off the 22–21 win from 34 yards out.

==== Week 11 ====
The Bears at 5-4 came out with a trick play on a Curtis Conway touchdown throw on a fake field goal attempt. Dan Marino was intercepted in the third but O.J. McDuffie grabbed the ball back. The Bears led 14-6 in the fourth before Marino and Irving Fryar hooked up big, leading to a Keith Jackson touchdown catch and a two-point conversion by Aaron Craver (signed back to the Dolphins only the week earlier). The Bears booted a go-ahead field goal late (17-14 score), but the Dolphins drove down field, only to see the Bears block Pete Stoyanovich's kick at the end.

==== Week 12 ====
Pittsburgh-born Marino's bomb to Fryar set up a first-quarter Keith Jackson touchdown, but Mike Tomczak erupted to 343 passing yards in a battle of field goals (four in regulation with a fatal miss by Stoyanovich in the second). The Dolphins tied the game, but in overtime the Steelers on a 39-yarder from Gary Anderson.

==== Week 13 ====
Week Thirteen: Miami Dolphins (7–4) at New York Jets (6–5)

Quarter	1	2	3	4	Total
**Dolphins**	0	0	14	14	**28**
Jets	3	7	14	0	**24**

at Giants Stadium, East Rutherford, New Jersey

- Date: November 27, 1994
- Game time: 1:00 p.m. EST
- Game weather: 33 °F (1 °C)
- Game attendance: 75,606
- Referee: Gary Lane
- TV announcers (NBC): Marv Albert and Paul Maguire
- Box Score, Box Score

Following back-to-back losses the Dolphins appeared shellshocked as the Jets raced to a 17–0 lead. A Marino touchdown to Mark Ingram in the third was followed by Boomer Esiason's second touchdown of the game to Johnny Mitchell. But in the fourth everything changed; after a second Marino-to-Ingram score Esiason was intercepted and this led to a third Marino-to-Ingram touchdown; a series of fumbles led to another Esiason pick by J.B. Brown, and with two timeouts left the Dolphins had the ball with 2:34 left. Marino drove the Dolphins to the Jets eight-yard line; at this point Marino called out "Clock! Clock! Clock!" in anticipation of spiking the ball to stop the clock – Marino, however, had worked out a trick play and was paying attention to Ingram's matchup with rookie Jets cornerback Aaron Glenn; with Ingram understanding Marino's code signal and Marino seeing a favorable matchup, Marino motioned downward as though spiking the ball, but then zipped it toward Ingram running to the front corner of the endzone where he caught it, his fourth touchdown of the game. The stunned Jets faltered on their final drive and the Clock Play became one of the most famous finishes in NFL history.

Team	Category	Player	Statistics
Dolphins	Passing	Dan Marino	31/44, 359 Yds, 4 TD, 2 INT
Dolphins	Rushing	Bernie Parmalee	8 Rush, 23 Yds
Dolphins	Receiving	Mark Ingram	9 Rec, 117 Yds, 4 TD
Jets	Passing	Boomer Esiason	26/41, 382 Yds, 2 TD, 3 INT
Jets	Rushing	Brad Baxter	12 Rush, 41 Yds, TD
Jets	Receiving	Rob Moore	7 Rec, 124 Yds

Scoring summary

Quarter	Time	Drive			Team	Scoring information	Score	
Quarter	Time	Plays	Yards	TOP	Team	Scoring information	MIA	NYJ
1	3:46				Jets	24-yard field goal by Nick Lowery	0	3
2	6:48				Jets	Johnny Mitchell 20-yard touchdown reception from Boomer Esiason, Nick Lowery kick good	0	10
3	12:58				Jets	Brad Baxter 3-yard touchdown run, Nick Lowery kick good	0	17
3	8:41				Dolphins	Mark Ingram 10-yard touchdown reception from Dan Marino, 2-point pass failed	6	17
3	3:39				Jets	Johnny Mitchell 14-yard touchdown reception from Boomer Esiason, Nick Lowery kick good	6	24
3	0:42				Dolphins	Mark Ingram 17-yard touchdown reception from Dan Marino, 2-point pass good	14	24
4	10:13				Dolphins	Mark Ingram 28-yard touchdown reception from Dan Marino, Pete Stoyanovich kick good	21	24
4	0:22				Dolphins	Mark Ingram 8-yard touchdown reception from Dan Marino, Pete Stoyanovich kick good	28	24
"TOP" = time of possession. For other American football terms, see Glossary of American football.							28	24

==== Week 14 ====
Despite the stunning win the 8–4 Dolphins were facing a division race where the Bills, entering at 6–6, were still in contention and the Patriots were on a late-season roll. The Dolphins raced to a 17–7 lead on the Bills but Marino was intercepted three times and the Bills scored three touchdowns in the third quarter, then answered a fourth-quarter Marino score to Keith Jackson with Carwell Gardner's rushing score and an 83-yard bomb from Jim Kelly to Andre Reed. With the outcome beyond saving Marino was benched and Bernie Kosar tossed a one-yard score to Scott Miller, but there was no saving a 42–31 Bills win.

==== Week 15 ====
Dan Marino faced a former San Francisco 49ers quarterback, but it wasn't regular Chiefs starter Joe Montana, sidelined after a 10–9 loss to Seattle a few weeks before; instead it was Joe Cool's former backup Steve Bono, but regardless of starter the Dolphins, now 8–5 and the division race not secure yet, played like they needed the win. The Chiefs took a 14–7 lead but Marino tied it at the half on a four-yard strike to Irving Fryar, then in the third ran in a four-yard score himself. On the next Dolphins drive Troy Vincent caught a lateral and ran in a 56-yard touchdown; Jon Vaughn of the Chiefs then ran in the ensuing kickoff for a Chiefs touchdown. 28–21 was the closest the Chiefs came as the Dolphins scored 17 more points to win 45–28.

==== Week 17 ====
The Dolphins celebrated Christmas by clinching the AFC East title. Bernie Parmalee ran wild as he scored three touchdowns and the Dolphins led 27–10 at the half. Two second-half Lions scores could not stop a 27–20 Dolphins win, finishing a 10–6 Dolphins record.

=== Standings ===
AFC East
	W	L	T	PCT	PF	PA	STK
^{(3)} Miami Dolphins	10	6	0	.625	389	327	W1
^{(5)} New England Patriots	10	6	0	.625	351	312	W7
Indianapolis Colts	8	8	0	.500	307	320	W2
Buffalo Bills	7	9	0	.438	340	356	L3
New York Jets	6	10	0	.375	264	320	L5

== Playoffs ==
Week	Date	Opponent (seed)	Result	Record	Venue
Wildcard	December 31	Kansas City Chiefs (6)	W 27–17	1–0	Joe Robbie Stadium
Divisional	January 8, 1995	at San Diego Chargers (2)	L 21–22	1–1	Jack Murphy Stadium

=== AFC wild card game ===
Miami Dolphins 27, Kansas City Chiefs 17

Quarter	1	2	3	4	Total
Chiefs	14	3	0	0	17
Dolphins	7	10	10	0	27

at Joe Robbie Stadium, Miami, Florida

- Game time: 4:00 p.m. EST
- Game weather: 72 °F (22 °C), clear
- Game attendance: 67,487
- Referee: Jerry Markbreit
- TV announcers (ABC): Al Michaels, Frank Gifford, and Dan Dierdorf

After a 17–17 tie at halftime, the Dolphins forced two turnovers in the second half to stop any Chiefs scoring threat. Both teams scored on each of their first 3 possessions of the game. Kansas City quarterback Joe Montana, playing in his last NFL game before retiring, threw two touchdowns in the first half: a 1-yard completion to tight end Derrick Walker and a 57-yarder to running back Kimble Anders. Meanwhile, Kansas City kicker Lin Elliot made a 21-yard field goal. For Miami in the first half, running back Bernie Parmalee scored a 1-yard touchdown, quarterback Dan Marino threw a 1-yard touchdown pass to tight end Ronnie Williams, and kicker Pete Stoyanovich made a 40-yard field goal.

The Dolphins then took the opening kickoff of the second half and marched 64 yards to score on wide receiver Irving Fryar's 7-yard touchdown reception. Stoyanovich then kicked a 40-yard field goal to give Miami a 27–17 lead. Early in the fourth quarter, Dolphins defensive back J.B. Brown intercepted a pass from Montana at the goal line. Then with 7:31 left in the game, Dolphins defensive back Michael Stewart wrestled the ball away from Chiefs running back Marcus Allen at the Miami 34-yard line to stop a second Kansas City scoring threat.

Montana finished his final postseason game with 314 passing yards and 2 touchdowns, with 1 interception.

Marino evened his post-season record vs. Montana at 1–1 (Montana having won Super Bowl XIX).

=== AFC Divisional Playoff ===
Miami Dolphins 21, San Diego Chargers 22

Quarter	1	2	3	4	Total
Dolphins	7	14	0	0	21
Chargers	0	6	9	7	22

The Dolphins raced to a 21–6 lead at the end of the first half as Marino threw three touchdowns sandwiched around two John Carney field goals for the Chargers, but the game began turning in the third when Bernie Parmalee was brought down in the Miami endzone by Chargers defensive tackle Reuben Davis for a safety. Natrone Means rushed for 139 yards and a 24-yard touchdown as the Dolphins offense was shut out in the second half. Stan Humphries threw for 276 yards and despite two interceptions managed a touchdown throw to Mark Seay in the fourth quarter. Marino led Miami to San Diego's 30-yard line as time ran down, but Pete Stoyanovich badly missed on a 47-yard attempt and ended Miami's chance for victory. The 22–21 San Diego win came thirteen years and six days after The Epic In Miami and ended Dan Marino's strong comeback season after he'd missed most of 1993 with a torn Achilles' tendon.

== Awards and honors ==
- Dan Marino, 1994 NFL Comeback Player of the Year
- Dan Marino, 1994 UPI AFL-AFC Player of the Year
- Dan Marino, AFC Pro Bowl Selection
- Dan Marino, All-Pro Selection

== Notes and references ==
- Miami Dolphins on Pro Football Reference
- Miami Dolphins on jt-sw.com
