= 1994–95 NFL playoffs =

American football tournament

- Dates: December 31, 1994–January 29, 1995
- Season: 1994
- Teams: 12
- Games played: 11
- Super Bowl XXIX site: Joe Robbie Stadium; Miami, Florida
- Defending champions: Dallas Cowboys
- Champion: San Francisco 49ers (5th title)
- Runner-up: San Diego Chargers
- Conference runners-up: Dallas Cowboys; Pittsburgh Steelers
NFL playoffs
← 1993–94	1995–96 →

The National Football League playoffs for the 1994 season began on December 31, 1994. The postseason tournament concluded with the San Francisco 49ers defeating the San Diego Chargers in an all-California matchup in Super Bowl XXIX, 49–26, on January 29, 1995, at Joe Robbie Stadium in Miami, Florida.

== Participants ==
Within each conference, the three division winners and the three non-division winners with the best overall regular season records qualified for the playoffs. The three division winners were seeded 1–3 based on the overall won-lost-tied record, and the three wild card teams were seeded 4–6. The NFL did not use a fixed bracket playoff system, and there were no restrictions regarding teams from the same division matching up in any round. In the first round, dubbed the wild-card playoffs or wild-card weekend, the third-seeded division winner hosted the sixth seed wild card, and the fourth seed hosted the fifth. The 1 and 2 seeds from each conference received a first-round bye. In the second round, the divisional playoffs, the number 1 seed hosted the worst-remaining seed from the first round (seed 4, 5, or 6), while the number 2 seed played the other team (seed 3, 4, or 5). The two winning teams from each conference's divisional playoff games then meet in the respective AFC and NFC Conference Championship games, hosted by the higher seed. Although the Super Bowl, the championship round of the playoffs, was played at a neutral site, the designated home team was based on an annual rotation by conference.

Playoff seeds
Seed	AFC	NFC
1	Pittsburgh Steelers (Central winner)	San Francisco 49ers (West winner)
2	San Diego Chargers (West winner)	Dallas Cowboys (East winner)
3	Miami Dolphins (East winner)	Minnesota Vikings (Central winner)
4	Cleveland Browns (wild card)	Green Bay Packers (wild card)
5	New England Patriots (wild card)	Detroit Lions (wild card)
6	Kansas City Chiefs (wild card)	Chicago Bears (wild card)

== Bracket ==
Dec 31 – Joe Robbie Stadium	Jan 8 – Jack Murphy Stadium
6	Kansas City	17
3	Miami	21
3	Miami	27	Jan 15 – Three Rivers Stadium
2	San Diego	22
AFC
Jan 1 – Cleveland Stadium	2	San Diego	17
Jan 7 – Three Rivers Stadium
1	Pittsburgh	13
5	New England	13	AFC Championship
4	Cleveland	9
4	Cleveland	20	Jan 29 – Joe Robbie Stadium
1	Pittsburgh	29
Wild Card playoffs
Divisional playoffs
Dec 31 – Lambeau Field	A2	San Diego	26
Jan 8 – Texas Stadium
N1	San Francisco	49
5	Detroit	12	Super Bowl XXIX
4	Green Bay	9
4	Green Bay	16	Jan 15 – Candlestick Park
2	Dallas	35
NFC
Jan 1 – Hubert H. Humphrey Metrodome	2	Dallas	28
Jan 7 – Candlestick Park
1	San Francisco	38
6	Chicago	35	NFC Championship
6	Chicago	15
3	Minnesota	18
1	San Francisco	44

== Schedule ==
Under the new U.S. television broadcast contracts that took effect starting this season, Fox replaced CBS as the broadcaster of most of the NFC playoff games. ABC continued to broadcast the first two Wild Card playoff games. NBC televised the rest of the AFC games. ABC was then the broadcaster for Super Bowl XXIX.

Round	Away team	Score	Home team	Date	Kickoff (ET / UTC−5)	TV
Wild-card round	Detroit Lions	12–16	Green Bay Packers	December 31, 1994	12:30 p.m.	ABC
Wild-card round	Kansas City Chiefs	17–27	Miami Dolphins	December 31, 1994	4:00 p.m.	ABC
Wild-card round	New England Patriots	13–20	Cleveland Browns	January 1, 1995	12:30 p.m.	NBC
Wild-card round	Chicago Bears	35–18	Minnesota Vikings	January 1, 1995	4:00 p.m.	Fox
Divisional round	Cleveland Browns	9–29	Pittsburgh Steelers	January 7, 1995	12:30 p.m.	NBC
Divisional round	Chicago Bears	15–44	San Francisco 49ers	January 7, 1995	4:00 p.m.	Fox
Divisional round	Green Bay Packers	9–35	Dallas Cowboys	January 8, 1995	12:30 p.m.	Fox
Divisional round	Miami Dolphins	21–22	San Diego Chargers	January 8, 1995	4:00 p.m.	NBC
Conference championships	Dallas Cowboys	28–38	San Francisco 49ers	January 15, 1995	12:30 p.m.	Fox
Conference championships	Pittsburgh Steelers	13–17	San Diego Chargers	January 15, 1995	4:00 p.m.	NBC
Super Bowl XXIX Joe Robbie Stadium Miami, Florida	San Diego Chargers	26–49	San Francisco 49ers	January 29, 1995	6:20 p.m.	ABC

== Wild-card round ==
=== Saturday, December 31, 1994 ===
==== NFC: Green Bay Packers 16, Detroit Lions 12 ====
Detroit Lions vs. Green Bay Packers – Game summary

Quarter	1	2	3	4	Total
Lions	0	0	3	9	12
Packers	7	3	3	3	16

at Lambeau Field, Green Bay, Wisconsin

- Game time: 12:30 p.m. EST/11:30 a.m. CST
- Game weather: 31 °F (−1 °C), partly cloudy
- Game attendance: 58,125
- Referee: Gary Lane
- TV announcers (ABC): Brent Musburger (play-by-play) and Dick Vermeil (color commentator)

Game information

First quarter

- GB – Dorsey Levens 3-yard run (Chris Jacke kick). Packers 7–0.

Second quarter

- GB – Chris Jacke 51-yard field goal. Packers 10–0.

Third quarter

- DET – Jason Hanson 38-yard field goal. Packers 10–3.
- GB – Chris Jacke 32-yard field goal. Packers 13–3.

Fourth quarter

- DET – Brett Perriman 3-yard pass from Dave Krieg (Jason Hanson kick). Packers 13–10.
- GB – Chris Jacke 28-yard field goal. Packers 16–10.
- DET – Safety, Craig Hentrich ran out of end zone. Packers 16–12.

Top passers

- DET – Dave Krieg – 17/35, 199 yards, TD
- GB – Brett Favre – 23/38, 262 yards

Top rushers

- DET – Barry Sanders – 13 rushes, −1 yard
- GB – Edgar Bennett – 22 rushes, 70 yards

Top receivers

- DET – Brett Perriman – 4 receptions, 62 yards, TD
- GB – Robert Brooks – 7 receptions, 88 yards

The Packers defense held Lions running back Barry Sanders to −1 rushing yards, while holding Detroit to 12 points and a postseason record low of −4 yards on the ground. The previous record was Chicago only giving up seven yards to New England in Super Bowl XX. Sanders lost yardage on six of his 13 carries. After running the ball on the Lions' first three plays, he didn't carry more than twice in any other series. "It's inconceivable to hold him to negative yards," Green Bay defensive end Reggie White said. "He does things that no other back does."

Playing without star receiver Sterling Sharpe, who had suffered a career-ending neck injury at the end of the season, Green Bay scored first with a 14-play, 76-yard drive. Packers quarterback Brett Favre completed 7/8 passes for 57 yards, while Dorsey Levens finished it off with a 3-yard touchdown run on fourth and inches. In the second quarter, Packers kicker Chris Jacke missed a 37-yard field goal attempt, but with 2:56 left in the half, he increased the score to 10–0 on a 51-yard field goal (a franchise postseason record) at the end of a 37-yard drive jump-started by Favre's 20-yard completion to tight end Mark Chmura. Detroit responded with Dave Krieg's 46-yard completion to Brett Perriman, earning them a first down on the Packers 11-yard line. But after two incompletions and a 1-yard loss by Sanders, Jason Hanson's 30-yard field goal attempt was no good.

On Green Bay's first drive of the second half, they reached the Lions 38-yard line, only to lose the ball when Edgar Bennett was tackled for no gain by Willie Clay on fourth and 1. On the next play, Krieg's 36-yard completion to Herman Moore moved the ball to the Green Bay 25, and Hanson eventually finished the drive by squeezing a 38-yard field goal inside the left upright, cutting Detroit's deficit to 10–3 with 5:58 left in the third quarter. Green Bay struck back with a 28-yard field goal by Jacke, set up by Favre's 26-yard completion to Robert Brooks, regaining a two-score advantage at 13–3. With time running out in the third quarter, Green Bay appeared to be in control of the game, but Detroit finally caught a break as Mel Gray returned the ensuing kickoff a franchise playoff record 68 yards to the Packers 18-yard line. Krieg eventually cashed in the big return with a 3-yard pass to Perriman, cutting the deficit to 13–10 with 13:35 left in the game.

Following a punt from each team, Brooks' 7-yard punt return gave the Packers the ball on their 49-yard line, where they proceeded to drive to a Jacke 28-yard field goal at the 5:35 mark to make it 16–10. Once again the Lions got a big boost from their special teams unit, this time a 27-yard return by Eric Lynch that gave them a first down on the Packers 49. Detroit subsequently drove to the Green Bay 11, including a 3-yard sneak by Krieg on fourth down and 1. But over the next three plays, Sanders gained two yards, Krieg threw an incomplete pass, and then he was sacked by linebacker Bryce Paup for a 6-yard loss. On fourth down and 14 from the 17-yard line, Detroit wide receiver Herman Moore caught Krieg's pass at the back of the end zone, but came down out of bounds past the end line, causing a turnover on downs. Afterwards, Green Bay ran out the rest of the clock, giving up an intentional safety when punter Craig Hentrich ran out of the end zone on the last play of the contest.

Grey returned four kickoffs for 159 yards and a punt for 17. Paup had two sacks. Favre completed 23 of 38 passes for 263 yards, while Krieg finished 17/35 for 199 yards and a touchdown. Both teams committed no turnovers, but Green Bay massively outgained Detroit in total yards, 336 to 171.

This was the second postseason meeting between the Lions and Packers. Green Bay won the only meeting the previous season.

Previous playoff games
Green Bay leads 1–0 in all-time playoff games

1993

Green Bay Packers 28 @ Detroit Lions 24

1993 NFC Wild Card playoffs

==== AFC: Miami Dolphins 27, Kansas City Chiefs 17 ====
Kansas City Chiefs vs. Miami Dolphins – Game summary

Quarter	1	2	3	4	Total
Chiefs	14	3	0	0	17
Dolphins	7	10	10	0	27

at Joe Robbie Stadium, Miami, Florida

- Game time: 4:00 p.m. EST
- Game weather: 72 °F (22 °C), clear
- Game attendance: 67,487
- Referee: Jerry Markbreit
- TV announcers (ABC): Al Michaels (play-by-play), Frank Gifford, and Dan Dierdorf (color commentators)

Game information

First quarter

- KC – Derrick Walker 1-yard pass from Joe Montana (Lin Elliott kick). Chiefs 7–0.
- MIA – Bernie Parmalee 1-yard run (Pete Stoyanovich kick). Tied 7–7.
- KC – Kimble Anders 57-yard pass from Joe Montana (Lin Elliott kick). Chiefs 14–7.

Second quarter

- MIA – Pete Stoyanovich 40-yard field goal. Chiefs 14–10.
- KC – Lin Elliott 21-yard field goal. Chiefs 17–10.
- MIA – Ronnie Williams 1-yard pass from Dan Marino (Pete Stoyanovich kick). Tied 17–17.

Third quarter

- MIA – Irving Fryar 7-yard pass from Dan Marino (Pete Stoyanovich kick). Dolphins 24–17.
- MIA – Pete Stoyanovich 40-yard field goal. Dolphins 27–17.

Fourth quarter

- No scoring.

Top passers

- KC – Joe Montana – 26/37, 314 yards, 2 TD, INT
- MIA – Dan Marino – 22/29, 257 yards, 2 TD

Top rushers

- KC – Marcus Allen – 14 rushes, 64 yards
- MIA – Bernie Parmalee – 15 rushes, 57 yards, TD

Top receivers

- KC – Kimble Anders – 6 receptions, 103 yards, TD
- MIA – Irving Fryar – 5 receptions, 71 yards, TD

This game marked the second time in December 1994 that the Monday Night Football crew came to Miami to cover a game between these two teams – on December 12, the Dolphins beat the Chiefs 45–28. Both teams produced a lot of yardage in this game (381 for Miami, 414 for KC), but the Chiefs two turnovers turned out to be a key difference, as Miami never turned the ball over at all.

The first half was a turbo charged shootout as both teams scored on all three of their possessions. Kansas City started it off with an 11-play, 80-yard drive in which quarterback Joe Montana, playing in what would be his last NFL game before retirement, completed all six of his passes, the last a 1-yard touchdown toss to tight end Derrick Walker. Miami responded with a 10-play, 72-yard drive including an 18-yard reception by Irving Fryar, who lateraled the ball to James Saxon for an additional 9-yard gain to the Kansas City 1. Bernie Parmalee ran the ball across the goal line from there, tying the game with 2:20 left in the first quarter. However, it took just four plays for Kansas City to retake the lead at 14–7 with Montana's 57-yard touchdown pass to running back Kimble Anders.

Miami scored a 40-yard Pete Stoyanovich field goal on the next series, cutting the score to 14–10 with 12:15 left in the half. Kansas City pushed their lead back up to seven points with a 66-yard drive that ended with a 20-yard field goal by Lin Elliott. With time running out in the second quarter, Miami struck back with a 13-play, 80-yard drive in which quarterback Dan Marino converted two third downs and one fourth down, completing a 17-yard strike to O. J. McDuffie on fourth and 3 from the Chiefs 36. Marino finished the series with a 1-yard touchdown pass to tight end Ronnie Williams, tying the score at 17 going into halftime. In the first half alone, Montana completed 12/15 passes for 178 yards and two touchdowns, while Marino finished it 14/16 for 172 yards and one score.

The Dolphins then took the opening kickoff of the second half and marched 64 yards in six plays to score on Fryar's 7-yard touchdown reception. Stoyanovich then kicked a 40-yard field goal to give Miami a 27–17 lead. Early in the fourth quarter, the Chiefs drove from their own 44 to the Miami 5-yard line. But J. B. Brown intercepted a pass from Montana at the goal line and ran the ball back 24 yards. Then with 7:31 left in the game, Michael Stewart wrestled the ball away from Chiefs running back Marcus Allen at the Miami 34-yard line to stop a second Kansas City scoring threat.

Montana finished his final postseason game with 314 passing yards and two touchdowns, with one interception. His top target was Anders, who caught six passes for 103 yards and a touchdown, while also rushing for 17 yards. Marino completed 22/29 passes for 257 yards and two touchdowns.

This was the third postseason meeting between the Chiefs and Dolphins. Miami won both prior meetings.

Previous playoff games
Miami leads 2–0 in all-time playoff games

1971

Miami Dolphins 27 @ Kansas City Chiefs 24 (2OT)

1971 AFC Divisional playoffs

1990

Kansas City Chiefs 16 @ Miami Dolphins 17

1990 AFC Wild Card playoffs

=== Sunday, January 1, 1995 ===
==== AFC: Cleveland Browns 20, New England Patriots 13 ====
New England Patriots vs. Cleveland Browns – Game summary

Quarter	1	2	3	4	Total
Patriots	0	10	0	3	13
Browns	3	7	7	3	20

at Cleveland Stadium, Cleveland, Ohio

- Game time: 12:30 p.m. EST
- Game weather: Cloudy, 40 °F (4 °C)
- Game attendance: 77,452
- Referee: Bernie Kukar
- TV announcers (NBC): Dick Enberg (play-by-play) and Bob Trumpy (color commentator)

Game information

First quarter

- CLE – Matt Stover 30-yard field goal. Browns 3–0.

Second quarter

- NE – Leroy Thompson 13-yard pass from Drew Bledsoe (Matt Bahr kick). Patriots 7–3.
- CLE – Mark Carrier 5-yard pass from Vinny Testaverde (Matt Stover kick). Browns 10–7.
- NE – Matt Bahr 23-yard field goal. Tied 10–10.

Third quarter

- CLE – Leroy Hoard 10-yard run (Matt Stover kick). Browns 17–10.

Fourth quarter

- CLE – Matt Stover 21-yard field goal. Browns 20–10.
- NE – Matt Bahr 33-yard field goal. Browns 20–13.

Top passers

- NE – Drew Bledsoe – 21/50, 235 yards, TD, 3 INT
- CLE – Vinny Testaverde – 20/30, 268 yards, TD

Top rushers

- NE – Corey Croom – 9 rushes, 35 yards
- CLE – Leroy Hoard – 17 rushes, 66 yards, TD

Top receivers

- NE – Vincent Brisby – 6 receptions, 83 yards
- CLE – Michael Jackson – 7 receptions, 122 yards

The Browns intercepted three passes from New England quarterback Drew Bledsoe and halted an attempted comeback in the final minutes of the game to clinch the victory.

Aided by quarterback Vinny Testaverde's completions to receivers Michael Jackson and Derrick Alexander for gains of 27 and 23 yards, Cleveland moved the ball 74 yards in eight plays on their opening drive and scored on Matt Stover's 30-yard field goal. They got another chance to score when Louis Riddick returned an interception 16 yards to the Patriots 33, but they could only gain one yard on their next three plays and decided to punt.

In the second quarter New England took a 7–3 lead on a 60-yard drive that ended with Bledsoe's 13-yard touchdown pass to running back Leroy Thompson. However, Cleveland tight end Brian Kinchen returned the kickoff 24 yards to the Browns 49-yard line and the team quickly drove 51 yards to retake the lead at 10–7, with Testaverde rushing twice for 14 yards and completing two passes for 29 total yards to Jackson on the way to throwing a 5-yard scoring pass to Mark Carrier. New England responded by driving 71 yards in 17 plays to score on a 23-yard field goal by Matt Bahr, tying the game at 10 going into halftime. The key play of the drive was a fake punt on fourth and 10 on the Browns 43, in which punter Pat O'Neill completed a 21-yard pass to Corwin Brown.

Cleveland started the third quarter with a drive to the Pats 17-yard line, but lost the ball on an Eric Metcalf fumble that was recovered by Patriots defensive end Mike Pitts, the Browns' only turnover of the game. After forcing a punt, Cleveland drove 79 yards in nine plays. Testeverde completed a 25-yard pass to fullback Leroy Hoard and a 14-yarder to Jackson, while Hoard eventually finished the drive with a 10-yard touchdown run to put the Browns back in front at 17–10.

New England had some success moving the ball on their next two drives, but both ended with Bledsoe interceptions. On the second one, Eric Turner picked off a pass from Bledsoe and returned the ball 28 yards to the New England 36 with seven minutes left in the game. From there, Cleveland managed to run the clock down to 3:36 before Stover's 21-yard field goal gave them a two-score lead at 20–10. However, New England put together a 63-yard drive to score on Bahr's 33-yard field goal with 1:33 remaining. New England then recovered the ensuing onside kick, but after gaining a first down, Bledsoe threw four straight incompletions and the ball was turned back to Cleveland on downs.

Testaverde finished the game 20/30 for 268 yards and a touchdown. His top target was Jackson, who caught seven passes for 122 yards. This was the last postseason win for the Cleveland Browns until the 2020 season.

This was the first postseason meeting between the Patriots and Browns.

==== NFC: Chicago Bears 35, Minnesota Vikings 18 ====
Chicago Bears vs. Minnesota Vikings – Game summary

Quarter	1	2	3	4	Total
Bears	0	14	7	14	35
Vikings	3	6	3	6	18

at Hubert H. Humphrey Metrodome, Minneapolis, Minnesota

- Game time: 4:00 p.m. EST/3:00 p.m. CST
- Game weather: Played indoors, domed stadium
- Game attendance: 60,347
- Referee: Red Cashion
- TV announcers (Fox): Pat Summerall (play-by-play) and John Madden (color commentator)

Game information

First quarter

- MIN – Fuad Reveiz 48-yard field goal. Vikings 3–0.

Second quarter

- CHI – Lewis Tillman 1-yard run (Kevin Butler kick). Bears 7–3.
- CHI – Keith Jennings 9-yard pass from Steve Walsh (Kevin Butler kick). Bears 14–3.
- MIN – Cris Carter 4-yard pass from Warren Moon (pass failed). Bears 14–9.

Third quarter

- CHI – Raymont Harris 29-yard run (Kevin Butler kick). Bears 21–9.
- MIN – Fuad Reveiz 48-yard field goal. Bears 21–12.

Fourth quarter

- CHI – Jeff Graham 21-yard pass from Steve Walsh (Kevin Butler kick). Bears 28–12.
- MIN – Amp Lee 11-yard pass from Warren Moon (pass failed). Bears 28–18.
- CHI – Kevin Miniefield 48-yard fumble return (Kevin Butler kick). Bears 35–18.

Top passers

- CHI – Steve Walsh – 15/23, 221 yards, 2 TD, INT
- MIN – Warren Moon – 29/52, 292 yards, 2 TD, 2 INT

Top rushers

- CHI – Raymont Harris – 13 rushes, 67 yards, TD
- MIN – Terry Allen – 12 rushes, 27 yards

Top receivers

- CHI – Jeff Graham – 4 receptions, 108 yards, TD
- MIN – Amp Lee – 11 receptions, 159 yards, TD

Bears quarterback Steve Walsh passed for 221 yards and two touchdowns as he led Chicago to a win.

However, the Bears committed two turnovers on their first two possessions. On their first play from scrimmage, Lewis Tillman lost a fumble that was recovered by Henry Thomas on the Chicago 6-yard line. The Vikings then scored on Fuad Reveiz' 29-yard field goal to give them a 3–0 lead, but only after a holding penalty on center Jeff Christy eliminated Terry Allen's touchdown run. After the kickoff, the Bears lost another turnover, this time an interception by cornerback Anthony Parker, who returned it 10 yards to the Chicago 39-yard line. However, the Vikings suffered another key holding penalty, this one forcing them to punt.

Early in the second quarter, Chicago went up 7–3 with a 16-play, 80-yard drive (with Walsh completing 6/6 passes) that ended on Tillman's 1-yard touchdown run. Then Barry Minter intercepted a pass from Minnesota quarterback Warren Moon and returned it seven yards to the Bears 29. Walsh subsequently led the Bears 71 yards, including his 52-yard completion to Jeff Graham and finished the drive with a 9-yard scoring pass to tight end Keith Jennings. Shortly before halftime, Moon's 38-yard completion to Amp Lee set up his 4-yard touchdown pass to Cris Carter that cut the score to 14–9, following a failed 2-point conversion attempt.

In the second half, Walsh completed a 23-yard pass to Graham and an 18-yarder to Curtis Conway before Raymont Harris' 29-yard touchdown run increased Chicago's lead to 21–9. Near the end of the quarter, Moon's 37-yard pass to Lee got the Vikings in range for Reveiz to kick a 48-yard field goal, making the score 21–12. But Walsh soon struck again with a 21-yard touchdown pass to Graham, giving the Bears a 28–12 lead. Now needing 16 points with 12:42 left in the game, Minnesota managed to drive 76 yards in 15 plays for a touchdown on Moon's 11-yard pass to Lee, but only after taking 7:06 off the clock in the process. Then Moon threw an incomplete pass on the 2-point conversion attempt, keeping the score at 28–18. The Vikings defense managed to force a punt, but after they got the ball back, Maurice Douglass forced a fumble that teammate Kevin Miniefield returned 48 yards for a touchdown.

Graham finished the game with four receptions for 108 yards and a touchdown, along with a 3-yard run. Lee caught 11 passes for 159 yards and a score. This would be the Bears' last playoff win until the 2006 season, and their last wild-card round playoff game until the 2018 season. This was the third consecutive year the Vikings were eliminated in the Wild Card playoffs.

This was the first postseason meeting between the Bears and Vikings.

== Divisional round ==
=== Saturday, January 7, 1995 ===
==== AFC: Pittsburgh Steelers 29, Cleveland Browns 9 ====
Cleveland Browns vs. Pittsburgh Steelers – Game summary

Quarter	1	2	3	4	Total
Browns	0	3	0	6	9
Steelers	3	21	3	2	29

at Three Rivers Stadium, Pittsburgh, Pennsylvania

- Game time: 12:30 p.m. EST
- Game weather: 29 °F (−2 °C), light snow
- Game attendance: 58,185
- Referee: Bob McElwee
- TV announcers (NBC): Marv Albert (play-by-play) and Paul Maguire (color commentator)

Game information

First quarter

- PIT – Gary Anderson 39-yard field goal. Steelers 3–0.

Second quarter

- PIT – Eric Green 2-yard pass from Neil O'Donnell (Gary Anderson kick). Steelers 10–0.
- PIT – John L. Williams 26-yard run (Gary Anderson kick). Steelers 17–0.
- CLE – Matt Stover 22-yard field goal. Steelers 17–3.
- PIT – Yancey Thigpen 9-yard pass from Neil O'Donnell (Gary Anderson kick). Steelers 24–3.

Third quarter

- PIT – Gary Anderson 40-yard field goal. Steelers 27–3.

Fourth quarter

- CLE – Keenan McCardell 20-yard pass from Vinny Testaverde (pass failed). Steelers 27–9.
- PIT – Safety, Vinny Testaverde sacked in end zone by Carnell Lake. Steelers 29–9.

Top passers

- CLE – Vinny Testaverde – 13/31, 144 yards, TD, 2 INT
- PIT – Neil O'Donnell – 16/23, 186 yards, 2 TD

Top rushers

- CLE – Ernest Byner – 9 rushes, 43 yards
- PIT – Barry Foster – 24 rushes, 133 yards

Top receivers

- CLE – Keenan McCardell – 3 receptions, 47 yards, TD
- PIT – Ernie Mills – 5 receptions, 117 yards

Pittsburgh had defeated Cleveland twice during the season, and proved to be more than capable of doing so again. Aided by running back Barry Foster's 133 rushing yards, the Steelers controlled the game by scoring on their first three possessions and holding the ball for 42:27. The Steelers finished the game with 424 yards of offense, including 238 yards on the ground, while holding the Browns to a mere 186 total yards.

On Pittsburgh's opening drive, they moved the ball 65 yards in 13 plays to score on Gary Anderson's 39-yard field goal. Cleveland had to punt on their next drive, and Tom Tupa's kick went just 26 yards to the Steelers 47-yard line. Pittsburgh then went 53 yards in eight plays, including a 21-yard completion from Neil O'Donnell to Ernie Mills, to go up 10–0 on O'Donnell's 2-yard touchdown pass to tight end Eric Green. On the Steelers next possession, Foster rushed three times for 40 yards as the team drove 74 yards to score on John L. Williams' 26-yard touchdown burst with 9:03 left in the second quarter.

After being completely dominated up to this point, Cleveland finally caught a break when Mark Carrier returned Mark Royals' 43-yard punt 20 yards to the Steelers 30-yard line, leading to Matt Stover's 22-yard field goal to cut the lead to 17–3, but in the closing seconds of the quarter, Steelers cornerback Tim McKyer intercepted a pass from Cleveland quarterback Vinny Testaverde and returned it 21 yards to the Browns 6-yard line. O'Donnell then completed a 9-yard touchdown to wide receiver Yancey Thigpen with 16 seconds left in the first half.

In the third quarter, the Steelers drove 72 yards to go up 27–3 on a 40-yard Anderson field goal. In the final quarter, the Browns took advantage of a 35-yard pass interference penalty on Steelers cornerback Deon Figures, converting it into a score with Testaverde's 20-yard touchdown pass to wide receiver Keenan McCardell. But on their next drive, the Cleveland quarterback was sacked in the end zone by Pittsburgh safety Carnell Lake for a safety with 2:45 left in the game.

O'Donnell finished the game 18/23 for 186 yards and two touchdowns. His top receiver was Mills, who caught five passes for 117 yards. This was the first playoff win for Steelers coach Bill Cowher, who had watched his team get eliminated from the playoffs in the first round in each of the past two seasons.

This was the first postseason meeting between the Browns and Steelers.

==== NFC: San Francisco 49ers 44, Chicago Bears 15 ====
Chicago Bears vs. San Francisco 49ers – Game summary

Quarter	1	2	3	4	Total
Bears	3	0	0	12	15
49ers	7	23	7	7	44

at Candlestick Park, San Francisco, California

- Game time: 4:00 p.m. EST/1:00 p.m. PST
- Game weather: 54 °F (12 °C), rain
- Game attendance: 64,644
- Referee: Howard Roe
- TV announcers (Fox): Dick Stockton (play-by-play) and Matt Millen (color commentator)

Game information

First quarter

- CHI – Kevin Butler 39-yard field goal. Bears 3–0.
- SF – William Floyd 2-yard run (Doug Brien kick). 49ers 7–3.

Second quarter

- SF – Brent Jones 8-yard pass from Steve Young (kick failed). 49ers 13–3.
- SF – William Floyd 4-yard run (Doug Brien kick). 49ers 20–3.
- SF – Doug Brien 36-yard field goal. 49ers 23–3.
- SF – Steve Young 6-yard run (Doug Brien kick). 49ers 30–3.

Third quarter

- SF – William Floyd 1-yard run (Doug Brien kick). 49ers 37–3.

Fourth quarter

- CHI – Jim Flanigan 2-yard pass from Erik Kramer (pass failed). 49ers 37–9.
- SF – Adam Walker 1-yard run (Doug Brien kick). 49ers 44–9.
- CHI – Lewis Tillman 1-yard run (pass failed). 49ers 44–15.

Top passers

- CHI – Erik Kramer – 19/28, 161 yards, TD
- SF – Steve Young – 16/22, 143 yards, TD

Top rushers

- CHI – Raymont Harris – 8 rushes, 26 yards
- SF – Ricky Watters – 11 rushes, 55 yards

Top receivers

- CHI – Tom Waddle – 3 receptions, 49 yards
- SF – John Taylor – 4 receptions, 51 yards

The 49ers scored on six consecutive possessions to crush the Bears 44–15.

Chicago scored first after Joe Cain forced a fumble from 49ers tight end Brent Jones that Alonzo Spellman recovered for the Bears on the San Francisco 36-yard line. The Bears then drove 14 yards to score on Kevin Butler's 39-yard field goal with 11:02 remaining in the first quarter. However, the 49ers then scored 37 unanswered points, including 23 in the second quarter. Meanwhile, Chicago would not score again until 14:11 remained in the game.

San Francisco responded to Butler's field goal with a 13-play, 68-yard drive to score on fullback William Floyd's 2-yard touchdown run. On the ensuing possession late in the first quarter, Eric Davis intercepted a pass from Steve Walsh on the 49ers 46-yard line. Receiver John Taylor rushed for 15 yards and caught a pass for 15 on the first two plays as the team drove 54 yards to score on Steve Young's 8-yard touchdown pass to Jones, giving them a 13–3 lead after Doug Brien missed the extra point. Chicago had to punt on their next drive, and the 49ers scored again with a 61-yard drive that ended on a 4-yard touchdown run by Floyd to make it 20–3. On the next series, 49ers safety Merton Hanks returned an interception from Walsh 31 yards to the Bears 36-yard line, setting up Brien's 36-yard field goal. Now down 23–3, the Bears showed their desperation with 2:15 left in the half when they attempted a fake punt in their own territory. Running back Tony Carter took a direct snap, but fumbled the ball as he started to run with it, and was downed by 49ers cornerback Dedrick Dodge on the Chicago 32. San Francisco then scored another touchdown on a 6-yard run by Young, giving them a 30–3 halftime lead and setting off an end-zone brawl between both teams when safety Shaun Gayle made a late hit on Young and the quarterback responded by angrily spiking the ball at Gayle's feet.

In the second half, each team scored two touchdowns. On San Francisco's first drive, they moved the ball 70 yards in nine plays, including a 23-yard run by Dexter Carter, to score with Floyd's third touchdown on a 1-yard run. After this Young left the game and was replaced by Elvis Grbac. Meanwhile, Chicago had already benched Walsh at the start of the half, replacing him with Erik Kramer. This didn't help on the Bears' first two second-half possessions, but with 5:06 left in the third quarter, Kramer completed 8/8 passes for 75 yards on drive that ended with his 2-yard touchdown pass to Jim Flanigan, an eligible lineman, on the second play of the final quarter.

Still faced with a 37–9 deficit, Chicago attempted an onside kick, but 49ers tight end Ted Popson recovered it. Grbac then completed a 44-yard pass to Carter that set up San Francisco's final score on Adam Walker's 1-yard touchdown run. Chicago responded by driving 70 yards in 17 plays to score on a 1-yard run by Lewis Tillman, but by then less than six minutes remained in the game.

San Francisco's win was the result of a team effort. They racked up 145 rushing yards even though their leading rusher (Ricky Watters) had just 55 yards on 11 carries. Their leading receiver, Taylor had just 51 yards. Young was 16 for 22 for 143 yards and a touchdown, while also rushing for 32 yards and another score. The only notable performance for Chicago was that of receiver Nate Lewis, who returned five kickoffs for 125 yards.

This would be Chicago's last postseason game on the road until 2020.

This was the third postseason meeting between the Bears and 49ers. San Francisco won both prior meetings.

Previous playoff games
San Francisco leads 2–0 in all-time playoff games

1984

Chicago Bears 0 @ San Francisco 49ers 23

1984 NFC Championship Game

1988

San Francisco 49ers 28 @ Chicago Bears 3

1988 NFC Championship Game

=== Sunday, January 8, 1995 ===
==== NFC: Dallas Cowboys 35, Green Bay Packers 9 ====
Green Bay Packers vs. Dallas Cowboys – Game summary

Quarter	1	2	3	4	Total
Packers	3	6	0	0	9
Cowboys	14	14	0	7	35

at Texas Stadium, Irving, Texas

- Game time: 12:30 p.m. EST/11:30 a.m. CST
- Game weather: 48 °F (9 °C), clear
- Game attendance: 64,745
- Referee: Ed Hochuli
- TV announcers (Fox): Pat Summerall (play-by-play) and John Madden (color commentator)

Game information

First quarter

- DAL – Emmitt Smith 5-yard run (Chris Boniol kick). Cowboys 7–0.
- GB – Chris Jacke 50-yard field goal. Cowboys 7–3.
- DAL – Alvin Harper 94-yard pass from Troy Aikman (Chris Boniol kick). Cowboys 14–3.

Second quarter

- DAL – Blair Thomas 1-yard run (Chris Boniol kick). Cowboys 21–3.
- GB – Edgar Bennett 1-yard run (pass failed). Cowboys 21–9.
- DAL – Scott Galbraith 1-yard pass from Troy Aikman (Chris Boniol kick). Cowboys 28–9.

Third quarter

- No scoring.

Fourth quarter

- DAL – Blair Thomas 2-yard run (Chris Boniol kick). Cowboys 35–9.

Top passers

- GB – Brett Favre – 18/35, 211 yards, INT
- DAL – Troy Aikman – 23/30, 337 yards, 2 TD, INT

Top rushers

- GB – Edgar Bennett – 11 rushes, 34 yards, TD
- DAL – Blair Thomas – 23 rushes, 70 yards, 2 TD

Top receivers

- GB – Robert Brooks – 8 receptions, 138 yards
- DAL – Michael Irvin – 6 receptions, 111 yards

Dallas crushed the Packers with 450 yards of offense and five touchdowns. In the first half alone, Dallas quarterback Troy Aikman completed 16 of 21 passes for 278 yards and two touchdowns.

Dallas receiver Kevin Williams returned the opening kickoff 36 yards to the Green Bay 49, sparking a 51-yard drive that ended with Emmitt Smith's 5-yard touchdown run. Smith ended up leaving the game in the first quarter with a hamstring injury, but before that he racked up 44 yards and his team never lost the edge without him. Green Bay responded to the touchdown by driving 47 yards, including a 20-yard run by Robert Brooks, and scoring with a 50-yard field goal by Chris Jacke, but from this point on they would be buried under a mountain of Dallas touchdowns.

Taking a snap from his own 6-yard line, Aikman dropped back into his own end zone and heaved a deep pass to Alvin Harper at midfield. Harper took off past Packer defenders George Teague and Terrell Buckley, made the catch, and raced all the way to the end zone, breaking a tackle attempt by Teague at the 14 on the way to a 94-yard touchdown reception. Harper's score gave the Cowboys a 14–3 lead and set an NFL playoff record for the longest play from scrimmage, breaking the old record (93 yards) set by Daryle Lamonica to Elbert Dubenion in the 1963 AFL postseason.

Dallas increased their lead to 21–3 on their next drive, with Aikman completing a 53-yard pass to Michael Irvin and a 22-yarder to tight end Jay Novacek at the Packers 1 before Smith's replacement, Blair Thomas ran the ball into the end zone from there. Green Bay struck back with a 74-yard drive, featuring Brett Favre's 59-yard completion to Brooks, to score on Edgar Bennett's 1-yard rushing touchdown. But their two-point conversion attempt failed and this ended up being their final scoring play of the game. Meanwhile, a 39-yard kickoff return by Williams set off a 52-yard drive that ended with Aikman's 1-yard touchdown pass to tight end Scott Galbraith with five seconds left in the half, giving Dallas a 28–9 halftime lead.

Green Bay had an early chance to score in the second half when linebacker Bryce Paup returned an interception from Aikman 34 yards to the Cowboys 28-yard line. But their ensuing drive was halted at the 20 and ended with no points when Jacke missed a 37-yard field goal attempt. That would be the closest they would get to scoring over the final two quarters, which included Green Bay turning the ball over on downs twice. Meanwhile, Dallas largely abandoned their passing game in the second half, but even without Smith, their rushing attack proved capable of protecting their lead. Thomas finished the game with 70 rushing yards, and added a second touchdown on a 2-yard run in the fourth quarter, making the final score 35–9.

Aikman completed 23 of 30 passes for 337 yards, two touchdowns, and an interception. Irvin caught six passes for 111 yards, Novacek caught 11 passes for 104 yards, and Harper caught two passes for 108 yards and a touchdown. This was the first playoff game to have three players on one team with over 100 receiving yards since the 1982 season. Brooks caught eight passes for 138 yards.

This was the fifth postseason meeting between the Packers and Cowboys. Both teams split the previous four meetings.

Previous playoff games
Tied 2–2 in all-time playoff games

1966

Green Bay Packers 34 @ Dallas Cowboys 27

1966 NFL Championship Game

1967

Dallas Cowboys 17 @ Green Bay Packers 21

1967 NFL Championship Game

1982

Green Bay Packers 26 @ Dallas Cowboys 37

1982 NFC second round playoffs

1993

Green Bay Packers 17 @ Dallas Cowboys 27

1993 NFC divisional playoffs

==== AFC: San Diego Chargers 22, Miami Dolphins 21 ====
Miami Dolphins vs. San Diego Chargers – Game summary

Quarter	1	2	3	4	Total
Dolphins	7	14	0	0	21
Chargers	0	6	9	7	22

at Jack Murphy Stadium, San Diego, California

- Game time: 4:00 p.m. EST/1:00 p.m. PST
- Game weather: 60 °F (16 °C), clear
- Game attendance: 63,381
- Referee: Johnny Grier
- TV announcers (NBC): Dick Enberg (play-by-play) and Bob Trumpy (color commentator)

Game information

First quarter

- MIA – Keith Jackson 8-yard pass from Dan Marino (Pete Stoyanovich kick). Dolphins 7–0.

Second quarter

- SD – John Carney 20-yard field goal. Dolphins 7–3.
- MIA – Keith Jackson 9-yard pass from Dan Marino (Pete Stoyanovich kick). Dolphins 14–3.
- SD – John Carney 21-yard field goal. Dolphins 14–6.
- MIA – Mike Williams 16-yard pass from Dan Marino (Pete Stoyanovich kick). Dolphins 21–6.

Third quarter

- SD – Safety, Reuben Davis tackled Bernie Parmalee in end zone. Dolphins 21–8.
- SD – Natrone Means 24-yard run (John Carney kick). Dolphins 21–15.

Fourth quarter

- SD – Mark Seay 8-yard pass from Stan Humphries (John Carney kick). Chargers 22–21.

Top passers

- MIA – Dan Marino – 24/38, 262 yards, 3 TD
- SD – Stan Humphries – 28/43, 276 yards, TD, 2 INT

Top rushers

- MIA – Bernie Parmalee – 7 rushes, 16 yards
- SD – Natrone Means – 24 rushes, 139 yards, TD

Top receivers

- MIA – Keith Jackson – 8 receptions, 109 yards, 2 TD
- SD – Tony Martin – 5 receptions, 62 yards

The Chargers overcame a 21–6 halftime deficit by limiting the Dolphins offense to only 16 plays in the second half.

Miami quarterback Dan Marino completed 14 of 18 passes in the first half for 151 yards as he led the team to three consecutive touchdowns. On their first touchdown drive, he completed 4/7 passes for 65 yards, the last an 8-yard scoring pass to tight end Keith Jackson. San Diego responded by driving 72 yards in 15 plays to score on a John Carney field goal. Receiver O. J. McDuffie returned the following kickoff 42 yards to the Miami 48-yard line, and the Dolphins ended up scoring another touchdown on Marino's 9-yard pass to Jackson, giving them a 14–3 lead with 7:21 left in the second quarter. The Chargers then drove 60 yards, including three carries by Natrone Means for 38, to score on Carney's second field goal. But this was countered again, with the Dolphins moving the ball 70 yards on a drive that featured a 24-yard reception by Irving Fryar. Marino finished it off with a 16-yard touchdown pass to receiver Mike Williams with 27 seconds left on the clock, giving the Dolphins a 21–6 halftime lead.

In the third quarter, San Diego drove all the way to the Dolphins 1-yard line on a 15-play drive that consumed over eight minutes, only to lose the ball on downs when Means was shoved out of bounds by defensive end Marco Coleman on a fourth down conversion attempt. However, Chargers defensive tackle Reuben Davis tackled Dolphins running back Bernie Parmalee in the end zone for a safety on the next play, sending Miami's tired defense back onto the field. San Diego then took the ensuing free kick and marched 54 yards to score on running back Means' 24-yard touchdown, cutting the score to 21–15.

Early in the fourth quarter, San Diego drove to the Dolphins 37-yard line, only to lose the ball when Stan Humphries threw an interception to Michael Stewart. But after forcing a punt with 3:39 left in the fourth quarter, the Chargers started a 61-yard drive that ended with Humphries' 8-yard touchdown pass to wide receiver Mark Seay, giving them a 22–21 lead with 35 seconds left in the game.

The Dolphins still had one last chance to win, as Carney's botched squib kick gave them the ball at their own 38. On the next play, a 32-yard pass interference penalty against Chargers safety Eric Castle gave the Dolphins a first down on the San Diego 30. But after two incomplete passes, Miami kicker Pete Stoyanovich was wide right on a 48-yard field goal attempt. This would be the last time the Chargers won a postseason game at home until the 2007 season

This game featured several questionable calls by officials. On one play, Jackson batted the ball forward along the ground after making a reception, and San Diego recovered it, but officials ruled Jackson's action to be an illegal forward pass rather than a botched lateral, allowing Miami to keep the ball. Later on, Chargers receiver Shawn Jefferson caught a 37-yard touchdown pass, but the referees ruled him out of bounds even though replays showed he was in. And on Means' 24-yard touchdown run, replays showed he had stepped out of bounds at the 2.

Miami gained just 282 yards, with only 26 yards on the ground, both season lows, while San Diego racked up 466 yards of offense. Means rushed for 139 yards and a touchdown, while Jackson caught eight passes for 109 yards and two scores. Marino completed 24 of 38 passes for 262 yards and three touchdowns.

This was the fourth postseason meeting between the Dolphins and Chargers. Miami won two of the previous three meetings.

Previous playoff games
Miami leads 2–1 in all-time playoff games

1981

San Diego Chargers 41 @ Miami Dolphins 38 (OT)

1981 AFC divisional playoffs

1982

San Diego Chargers 13 @ Miami Dolphins 34

1982 AFC second round playoffs

1992

San Diego Chargers 0 @ Miami Dolphins 31

1992 AFC divisional playoffs

== Conference championships ==
=== Sunday, January 15, 1995 ===
==== AFC: San Diego Chargers 17, Pittsburgh Steelers 13 ====
San Diego Chargers vs. Pittsburgh Steelers – Game summary

Quarter	1	2	3	4	Total
Chargers	0	3	7	7	17
Steelers	7	3	3	0	13

at Three Rivers Stadium, Pittsburgh, Pennsylvania

- Game time: 12:30 p.m. EST
- Game weather: 59 °F (15 °C), fog with heavy rain
- Game attendance: 61,545
- Referee: Gerald Austin
- TV announcers (NBC): Dick Enberg (play-by-play) and Bob Trumpy (color commentator)

Game information

First quarter

- PIT – John L. Williams 16-yard pass from Neil O'Donnell (Gary Anderson kick). Steelers 7–0.

Second quarter

- SD – John Carney 20-yard field goal. Steelers 7–3.
- PIT – Gary Anderson 39-yard field goal. Steelers 10–3.

Third quarter

- PIT – Gary Anderson 23-yard field goal. Steelers 13–3.
- SD – Alfred Pupunu 43-yard pass from Stan Humphries (John Carney kick). Steelers 13–10.

Fourth quarter

- SD – Tony Martin 43-yard pass from Stan Humphries (John Carney kick). Chargers 17–13.

Top passers

- SD – Stan Humphries – 11/22, 165 yards, 2 TD, INT
- PIT – Neil O'Donnell – 32/54, 349 yards, TD

Top rushers

- SD – Natrone Means – 20 rushes, 69 yards
- PIT – Barry Foster – 20 rushes, 47 yards

Top receivers

- SD – Alfred Pupunu – 4 receptions, 76 yards, TD
- PIT – Ernie Mills – 8 receptions, 106 yards

The Chargers scored 14 unanswered points in the second half to upset the heavily favored Steelers. In one of the greatest games in his career, Junior Seau recorded 16 tackles while playing with a pinched nerve in his neck. Although Pittsburgh held advantages in total plays (80–47), total offensive yards (415–226), and time of possession (37:13–22:47), it was San Diego who made the big plays.

The Steelers took the opening kickoff and drove 67 yards to a score on Neil O'Donnell's 16-yard touchdown pass to fullback John L. Williams. O'Donnell also made two big completions to Andre Hastings on the drive, the first for 18 yards, and the second for 11 yards on fourth down and 2. Later in the quarter, the Chargers got a big opportunity when safety Darren Carrington recovered a fumble from Steelers running back Barry Foster on the San Diego 41, but Pittsburgh's defense stepped up and forced a punt. Pittsburgh then advanced the ball to the Chargers 27-yard line, but a holding penalty pushed them out of field goal range and they ended up punting it back.

In the second quarter, San Diego's offense finally managed to get a drive going, with running back Natrone Means rushing for 17 yards and catching a pass for 15. On the next play, a long pass interference penalty gave them a first down on the Steelers 3-yard line, but they could not get into the end zone and settled for John Carney's field goal, cutting the score to 7–3. Pittsburgh struck back with a 12-play, 51-yard drive, including three first down completions from O'Donnell to receiver Ernie Mills, and scored on Gary Anderson's 39-yard field goal with 13 seconds left in the half. Although their halftime lead was only 10–3, Pittsburgh seemed in control of the game. They had outgained San Diego in total yards 229–46, and first downs 13–4.

The situation kept getting better for Pittsburgh in the second half. Humphries was intercepted by cornerback Rod Woodson on the third play of the quarter, and O'Donnell's 33-yard aerial strike to tight end Eric Green set up Anderson's 23-yard field goal, increasing their lead to 13–3. But on the fifth play of the Chargers ensuing drive, quarterback Stan Humphries faked a handoff, fooling the Steelers defensive backs long enough to find tight end Alfred Pupunu wide open to complete a 43-yard touchdown. The score was cut to 13–10 and would remain so going into the fourth quarter.

Early in the final quarter, Humphries completed consecutive passes to Pupunu for 31 yards, moving the ball across midfield. Then with 5:13 left in the game, Humphries threw a 43-yard touchdown pass to wide receiver Tony Martin, who out-jumped Tim McKyer to make the catch and give the Chargers a 17–13 lead. O'Donnell then completed seven consecutive passes, the longest a 21-yard gain to Green that gave them a first and goal at the Chargers 9-yard line and put them in position for a potential winning touchdown. However, Foster was dropped for a one-yard loss on the next play, followed by an incompletion and a 7-yard catch by Williams. On fourth down, Chargers linebacker Dennis Gibson sealed the victory by tipping away O'Donnell's pass intended for Foster. The Steelers lost for the first time during the season in which they held a lead at halftime. (In 1994, they were 9–0 when leading at halftime prior to this game.)

O'Donnell completed 32 of 54 passes for 349 yards and a touchdown. His top receiver was Mills, who caught eight passes for 106 yards. Humphries completed 11 of 22 passes for 165 yards, two touchdowns, and an interception. This would be the Chargers' last playoff win until 2007.

This was the second postseason meeting between the Chargers and Steelers. San Diego won the only prior meeting.

Previous playoff games
San Diego leads 1–0 in all-time playoff games

1982

San Diego Chargers 31 @ Pittsburgh Steelers 28

1982 AFC first round playoffs

==== NFC: San Francisco 49ers 38, Dallas Cowboys 28 ====
Dallas Cowboys vs. San Francisco 49ers – Game summary

Quarter	1	2	3	4	Total
Cowboys	7	7	7	7	28
49ers	21	10	7	0	38

at Candlestick Park, San Francisco, California

- Game time: 4:00 p.m. EST/1:00 p.m. PST
- Game weather: 50 °F (10 °C), partly cloudy
- Game attendance: 69,125
- Referee: Dick Hantak
- TV announcers (Fox): Pat Summerall (play-by-play) and John Madden (color commentator)

Game information

First quarter

- SF – Eric Davis 44-yard interception return (Doug Brien kick). 49ers 7–0.
- SF – Ricky Watters 29-yard pass from Steve Young (Doug Brien kick). 49ers 14–0.
- SF – William Floyd 1-yard run (Doug Brien kick). 49ers 21–0.
- DAL – Michael Irvin 44-yard pass from Troy Aikman (Chris Boniol kick). 49ers 21–7.

Second quarter

- SF – Doug Brien 34-yard field goal. 49ers 24–7.
- DAL – Emmitt Smith 4-yard run (Chris Boniol kick). 49ers 24–14.
- SF – Jerry Rice 28-yard pass from Steve Young (Doug Brien kick). 49ers 31–14.

Third quarter

- DAL – Emmitt Smith 1-yard run (Chris Boniol kick). 49ers 31–21.
- SF – Steve Young 3-yard run (Doug Brien kick). 49ers 38–21.

Fourth quarter

- DAL – Michael Irvin 10-yard pass from Troy Aikman (Chris Boniol kick). 49ers 38–28.

Top passers

- DAL – Troy Aikman – 30/53, 380 yards, 2 TD, 3 INT
- SF – Steve Young – 13/29, 155 yards, 2 TD

Top rushers

- DAL – Emmitt Smith – 20 rushes, 74 yards, 2 TD
- SF – Ricky Watters – 14 rushes, 72 yards

Top receivers

- DAL – Michael Irvin – 12 receptions, 192 yards, 2 TD
- SF – Brent Jones – 3 receptions, 37 yards

This was the third straight season that the Cowboys and 49ers met in the NFC Championship Game, with Dallas winning the first two conference title games. San Francisco quarterback Steve Young still faced the pressure of "never being able to win the big ones", while Dallas quarterback Troy Aikman entered the game with a 7–0 win–loss record as a starter in the playoffs.

Although the Cowboys eventually held a 451–294 advantage in total offensive yards, the 49ers converted three turnovers into 21 points in the first quarter as they eliminated the two-time defending Super Bowl champion Cowboys, 38–28. On the third play of the game, San Francisco cornerback Eric Davis intercepted Aikman's pass, plowing right through the intended target (receiver Kevin Williams) as he snagged the ball out of the air and returned it 44 yards for a touchdown. On the next Dallas possession, Davis stripped the ball away from receiver Michael Irvin and fellow defensive back Tim McDonald recovered it on the Dallas 39, setting up a 29-yard touchdown pass from Young to running back Ricky Watters, who eluded several Cowboys defenders high-stepping his way down the sideline en route to the goal line in spectacular showboating fashion. Williams then fumbled the ensuing kickoff when hit by 49ers running back Adam Walker. San Francisco kicker Doug Brien recovered the ball at the Cowboys 35-yard line, and then Young went back to work, converting a third and 1 with a 2-yard sneak and then throwing a 14-yard pass to receiver John Taylor. On the next play, Young ran the ball nine yards to the 1-yard line, and running back William Floyd took the ball into the end zone from there to give his team a 21–0 lead with 7:33 left in the first quarter.

This time Dallas was able to respond, driving 62 yards in eight plays and converting a third and 23 situation with a 44-yard touchdown pass from Aikman to Irvin, making the score 21–7 going into the second quarter. Then after forcing a punt, Dallas drove to a third and 10 situation on the 49ers 12-yard line. The Cowboys tried to fool San Francisco with a draw play by Emmitt Smith, but he was tackled after gaining two yards and Chris Boniol missed a 27-yard field goal on the next play. Aided by a 33-yard pass interference penalty on Larry Brown, the 49ers drove 64 yards in 11 plays, including a 10-yard catch by tight end Brent Jones on fourth and 3, to a 34-yard field goal by Brien, but Dallas countered with a 62-yard drive in which Aikman completed passes to Jay Novacek for gains of 15 and 19 yards on the way to a 4-yard rushing touchdown by Smith, closing the gap to 24–14. In the closing minutes of the first half, Aikman threw three straight incompletions, and a 23-yard punt by the Cowboys' John Jett gave San Francisco the ball on the Dallas 39 with 30 seconds left. Two carries by Floyd gained 11 yards, and then Young threw a 28-yard touchdown completion to All-Pro wide receiver Jerry Rice, who made a diving catch in the back-left corner of the end zone with eight seconds left in the first half to make the score 31–14.

In the third quarter, Walker muffed the opening kickoff and Dallas cornerback Dave Thomas recovered it on the 49ers 25. Aided by a personal foul penalty against linebacker Rickey Jackson, Dallas drove 25 yards in seven plays to score on Smith's 1-yard touchdown run. However, the 49ers stormed right back with a 10-play, 70-yard drive that ended with Young's 3-yard rushing touchdown. Then Deion Sanders ended the Cowboys next drive with an interception. San Francisco ended up punting, but Klaus Wilmsmeyer's kick pinned Dallas back at their 11. In the final quarter, Dallas finished an 89-yard, 14-play drive with Aikman's 10-yard touchdown pass to Irvin, cutting the score to 38–28, but they could not score again. Smith, who compiled 74 yards and two touchdowns, departed during that drive with an injured hamstring, which he had already injured before this game. The Cowboys had two more drives, both of which resulted in turnovers on downs. At one point, Dallas coach Barry Switzer, furious that Sanders was not called for pass interference, stormed onto the field and bumped an official while arguing, which resulted in a 15-yard penalty against the Cowboys, and Aikman was sacked by defensive end Tim Harris on fourth down on the next play. Although Aikman broke an NFC Championship Game record with 380 yards passing, and Irvin also broke an NFC Championship Game record with 192 receiving yards, ultimately the first-quarter turnovers were too much to overcome.

Young completed only 13 of 29 passes for 155 yards, but threw two touchdowns while also rushing for 47 yards and another score. Watters rushed for 72 yards and caught a 29-yard scoring reception. Williams returned six kickoffs for 130 yards, rushed for 12 yards, and caught six passes for 78 yards. Harris and defensive tackle Rhett Hall each had two sacks. Davis had two interceptions and a forced fumble.

This was the seventh postseason meeting between the Cowboys and 49ers. Dallas won five of the first six meetings. This is the most frequent matchup in the conference championship round since the merger.

Previous playoff games
Dallas leads 5–1 in all-time playoff games

1970

Dallas Cowboys 17 @ San Francisco 49ers 10

1970 NFC Championship Game

1971

San Francisco 49ers 3 @ Dallas Cowboys 14

1971 NFC Championship Game

1972

Dallas Cowboys 30 @ San Francisco 49ers 28

1972 NFC Divisional playoffs

1981

Dallas Cowboys 27 @ San Francisco 49ers 28

1981 NFC Championship Game

1992

Dallas Cowboys 30 @ San Francisco 49ers 20

1992 NFC Championship Game

1993

San Francisco 49ers 21 @ Dallas Cowboys 38

1993 NFC Championship Game

== Super Bowl XXIX: San Francisco 49ers 49, San Diego Chargers 26 ==
Super Bowl XXIX – San Diego Chargers vs. San Francisco 49ers – Game summary

Quarter	1	2	3	4	Total
Chargers (AFC)	7	3	8	8	26
49ers (NFC)	14	14	14	7	49

at Joe Robbie Stadium, Miami, Florida

- Date: January 29, 1995
- Game attendance: 74,107
- Referee: Jerry Markbreit
- TV announcers (ABC): Al Michaels (play-by-play), Frank Gifford, and Dan Dierdorf (color commentators)

This was the first Super Bowl meeting between the Chargers and 49ers.

As of 2026, this is the last Super Bowl to feature two teams from the same state.
