= 1994 New England Patriots season =

Season of National Football League team the New England Patriots

- Owner: Robert Kraft
- Head coach: Bill Parcells
- Offensive coordinator: Ray Perkins
- Defensive coordinator: Al Groh
- Home stadium: Foxboro Stadium

Results
- Record: 10–6
- Division place: 2nd AFC East
- Playoffs: Lost Wild Card Playoffs (at Browns) 13–20
- All-Pros: TE Ben Coates (1st team)
- Pro Bowlers: T Bruce Armstrong; QB Drew Bledsoe; TE Ben Coates

Uniform

The 1994 New England Patriots season was the team's 35th season, and 25th in the National Football League (NFL). It was the first under owner Robert Kraft, who purchased the team after preventing previous owner James Orthwein from moving the Patriots to St. Louis. The Patriots finished the season with a record of ten wins and six losses, and finished tied for first in the AFC's East division.

The Patriots began the 1994 season with a 3–6 record before winning their final seven games, finishing 10–6 and qualifying the playoffs (their first winning season in 6 years). The Patriots were just two seasons removed from a 2-win season, and made the playoffs for the first time since 1986 and only the seventh time in the team's history. It was also their first winning season since 1988. The winning streak started with a 26–20 overtime win over the Minnesota Vikings. In the Wild Card round of the playoffs the Cleveland Browns defeated the New England Patriots 20–13.

== Drew Bledsoe and offensive imbalance ==
In just his second NFL season, Patriots quarterback Drew Bledsoe threw the ball more than any quarterback in history in 1994. He set NFL records for pass attempts in a season (691 – this record was later broken by Matthew Stafford in 2012), pass completions and attempts in a game (45-for-70 with no interceptions, Week Eleven vs. Minnesota in overtime), and most games in a season with 50+ attempts (five). Bledsoe also led the NFL in passing in 1994, with 4,555 yards, and was fourth in touchdowns (25). Bledsoe also led the league in interceptions (27) and his passer rating was tied for 19th in the league, at 73.6. New England's 699 team pass attempts in 1994 is the third-most in NFL history, and the most ever for a team with a winning record.

In an odd statistical quirk, the Patriots' running game was one of the most inefficient in modern football. Their rushing game only gained 2.79 yards per attempt, the worst of any NFL team since the merger. (The average ground gain in 1994 was 3.7 yards per carry.) New England's 1,332 yards were dead-last in the AFC, and the second-fewest in the NFL to Atlanta.

== Ownership changes ==
The team's 35th season in football, 1994 marked the debut of Robert Kraft as team owner. A long-time season-ticket holder, Kraft has steadily built up a business empire to where in the late 1980s he was able to purchase the land around Sullivan Stadium and then the stadium itself – which he renamed "Foxboro Stadium" – and thus got control of the lease the team held with the stadium. This gave him a level of control over the team that new owners Victor Kiam and James Orthwein underestimated, so much that in January 1994, Orthwein sold his share of the team to Kraft, for nearly $200 million.

The selling of the team to Kraft led to an explosion of ticket sales, to where all home games were sold out well before the season began.

As part of the NFL's 75th anniversary celebration the Patriots wore throwback uniforms in games against the Cincinnati Bengals, Green Bay Packers, and New York Jets; the uniforms dated to the team's AFL days and marked the return of the Pat Patriot logo in the second season the team sported the more streamlined "Flying Elvis" look.

== Offseason ==
Additions	Subtractions
RB Leroy Thompson (Steelers)	TE Marv Cook (Bears)
S Myron Guyton (Giants)	WR Greg McMurtry (Bears)
DE Mike Jones (Cardinals)	LB Andre Tippett (retirement)

=== 1994 NFL draft ===
1994 New England Patriots draft
Round	Pick	Player	Position	College	Notes
1	4	Willie McGinest *	LB	USC	
2	35	Kevin Lee	WR	Alabama	
3	78	Ervin Collier	DT	Florida A&M	from San Diego (Note: New England traded its third- and fifth-round selections (70th and 137th) to San Diego in exchange for San Diego's third-round selection (78th) and RB Marion Butts.)
3	90	Joe Burch	C	Texas Southern	from Miami (Note: Miami traded its third-round selection (90th) and second-round selection (51st) in 1993 to New England in exchange for WR Irving Fryar.)
4	121	John Burke	TE	Virginia Tech	from Miami via Arizona (Note: New England traded its fourth-round selection (107th) to Arizona in exchange for Arizona's fourth- and fifth-round selections (121st and 135th).)
5	135	Pat O'Neill	P	Syracuse	from LA Rams via Arizona
6	166	Steve Hawkins	WR	Western Michigan	
6	168	Max Lane	OT	Navy	from Seattle (Note: Seattle traded its sixth-round selection (168th) to New England in exchange for RB Jon Vaughn.)
7	198	Jay Walker	QB	Howard	
7	222	Marty Moore	LB	Kentucky	from Dallas (Note: Dallas traded its seventh-round selection (222nd) to New England in exchange for QB Hugh Millen.)
Made roster * Made at least one Pro Bowl during career

Draft trades and notes

=== Undrafted free agents ===
1994 undrafted free agents of note
Player	Position	College
Greg Ballard	Wide receiver	Kansas
Troy Barnett	Defensive end	North Carolina
Bernard Basham	Defensive tackle	Virginia Tech

== Personnel ==
=== Staff ===
1994 New England Patriots staff
Front office: President and Chief Executive Officer – Robert Kraft; Vice President and Owner's Representative – Jonathan Kraft; Vice President of Business Operations – Andy Wasynczuk; Vice President of Football Operations – Patrick Forte; Director of College Scouting – Charley Armey; Director of Pro Scouting – Bobby Grier; Scouting Consultant – Bucko Kilroy; Head coaches: Head Coach – Bill Parcells; Offensive coaches: Offensive Coordinator – Ray Perkins; Running Backs – Mike Pope; Wide Receivers – Chris Palmer; Tight Ends – Charlie Weis; Offensive Line – Fred Hoaglin; Offensive Assistant – Maurice Carthon	Defensive coaches: Defensive Coordinator/Linebackers – Al Groh; Defensive Line – Romeo Crennel; Defensive Backs – Bob Trott; Special teams coaches: Special Teams – Mike Sweatman; Special Assistant – Dante Scarnecchia; Strength and conditioning: Strength and Conditioning – Johnny Parker

=== Roster ===
1994 New England Patriots roster
Quarterbacks (QB): 11 Drew Bledsoe; 7 Jay Walker; 16 Scott Zolak; Running backs (RB): 44 Marion Butts; 26 Corey Croom KR; 33 Sam Gash FB; 35 Burnie Legette FB; 36 Leroy Thompson KR; 34 Kevin Turner FB; Wide receivers (WR): 82 Vincent Brisby; 86 Troy Brown PR; 81 Ray Crittenden; 84 Elbert Ellis; 83 Michael Timpson; Tight ends (TE): 85 John Burke; 87 Ben Coates; 88 Paul Francisco	Offensive linemen (OL): 78 Bruce Armstrong T; 65 Mike Arthur C; 69 Eugene Chung G; 67 Mike Gisler C; 61 Bob Kratch G; 77 Pat Harlow T; 68 Max Lane T; 70 Brandon Moore T; 71 Todd Rucci G; Defensive linemen (DL): 92 Ray Agnew; 98 Troy Barnett DE; 97 Aaron Jones DE; 96 Mike Jones DE; 93 Mike Pitts DE; 63 Buster Stanley NT; 91 Bruce Walker NT	Linebackers (LB): 52 David Bavaro ILB; 51 Andre Bowden ILB; 59 Vincent Brown ILB; 55 Willie McGinest OLB; 58 Marty Moore ILB; 95 Dwayne Sabb OLB; 53 Chris Slade OLB; Defensive backs (DB): 42 Harlon Barnett SS; 30 Corwin Brown SS; 29 Myron Guyton FS; 37 Maurice Hurst CB; 43 Vernon Lewis CB; 23 Terry Ray S; 21 Ricky Reynolds CB; 22 Rod Smith CB; 25 Larry Whigham FS; 27 Darryl Wren CB; Special teams (ST): 3 Matt Bahr K; 50 Steve DeOssie LS; 5 Pat O'Neill P	Practice squad: 99 James Gregory DE; 12 Mario Henry WR; 62 Rich Tylski G; Reserve: 54 Todd Collins LB (IR); 72 Tim Goad NT (IR); 80 Steve Hawkins WR (IR); -- Kevin Lee WR (IR); 74 Doug Skene G (IR); 53 active, 5 inactive, 3 practice squad Rookies in italics

== Schedule ==
Week	Date	Opponent	Result	Record	Venue	Attendance
1	September 4	at **Miami Dolphins**	**L** 35–39	0–1	Joe Robbie Stadium	Recap
2	September 11	**Buffalo Bills**	**L** 35–38	0–2	Foxboro Stadium	Recap
3	September 18	at Cincinnati Bengals	**W** 31–28	1–2	Riverfront Stadium	Recap
4	September 25	at Detroit Lions	**W** 23–17	2–2	Pontiac Silverdome	Recap
5	October 2	Green Bay Packers	**W** 17–16	3–2	Foxboro Stadium	Recap
6	October 9	Los Angeles Raiders	**L** 17–21	3–3	Foxboro Stadium	Recap
7	October 16	at **New York Jets**	**L** 17–24	3–4	Giants Stadium	Recap
8	Bye					
9	October 30	**Miami Dolphins**	**L** 3–23	3–5	Foxboro Stadium	Recap
10	November 6	at Cleveland Browns	**L** 6–13	3–6	Cleveland Stadium	Recap
11	November 13	Minnesota Vikings	**W** 26–20 (OT)	4–6	Foxboro Stadium	Recap
12	November 20	San Diego Chargers	**W** 23–17	5–6	Foxboro Stadium	Recap
13	November 27	at **Indianapolis Colts**	**W** 12–10	6–6	RCA Dome	Recap
14	December 4	**New York Jets**	**W** 24–13	7–6	Foxboro Stadium	Recap
15	December 11	**Indianapolis Colts**	**W** 28–13	8–6	Foxboro Stadium	Recap
16	December 18	at **Buffalo Bills**	**W** 41–17	9–6	Rich Stadium	Recap
17	December 24	at Chicago Bears	**W** 13–3	10–6	Soldier Field	Recap
Note: Intra-division opponents are in **bold** text.

=== Playoffs ===
Round	Date	Opponent (seed)	Result	Record	Venue	Attendance
Wild Card	January 1, 1995	at Cleveland Browns (4)	**L** 13–20	0–1	Cleveland Stadium	Recap

== Standings ==
AFC East
	W	L	T	PCT	PF	PA	STK
^{(3)} Miami Dolphins	10	6	0	.625	389	327	W1
^{(5)} New England Patriots	10	6	0	.625	351	312	W7
Indianapolis Colts	8	8	0	.500	307	320	W2
Buffalo Bills	7	9	0	.438	340	356	L3
New York Jets	6	10	0	.375	264	320	L5

== Game summaries ==
=== Regular season ===
==== Week 1: at Miami Dolphins ====
Week 1: New England Patriots at Miami Dolphins – Game summary

Quarter	1	2	3	4	Total
Patriots	7	7	14	7	35
Dolphins	0	10	15	14	39

at Joe Robbie Stadium, Miami Gardens, Florida

- Date: September 4
- Game time: 4:00 p.m. EDT
- Game weather: 83 °F (28 °C)
- Game attendance: 69,613
- Referee: Gordon McCarter
- TV announcers (NBC): Jim Lampley and Todd Christensen
- Box score

Game information

First quarter

- NE – Kevin Turner 1-yard run (Matt Bahr kick). Patriots 7–0.

Second quarter

- MIA – Mark Ingram Sr. 64-yard pass from Dan Marino (Pete Stoyanovich kick). Tied 7–7.
- NE – Ben Coates 16-yard pass from Drew Bledsoe (Matt Bahr kick). Patriots 14–7.
- MIA – Pete Stoyanovich 42-yard field goal. Patriots 14–10.

Third quarter

- NE – Ben Coates 62-yard pass from Drew Bledsoe (Matt Bahr kick). Patriots 21–10.
- MIA – Keith Jackson 26-yard pass from Dan Marino (Terry Kirby run). Patriots 21–18.
- NE – Michael Timpson 5-yard pass from Drew Bledsoe (Matt Bahr kick). Patriots 28–18.
- MIA – Irving Fryar 54-yard pass from Dan Marino (Pete Stoyanovich kick). Patriots 28–25.

Fourth quarter

- MIA – Irving Fryar 50-yard pass from Dan Marino (Pete Stoyanovich kick). Dolphins 32–28.
- NE – Ray Crittenden 23-yard pass from Drew Bledsoe (Matt Bahr kick). Patriots 35–32.
- MIA – Irving Fryar 35-yard pass from Dan Marino (Pete Stoyanovich kick). Dolphins 39–35.

Top passers

- NE – Drew Bledsoe – 32/51, 421 yards, 4 TD, 2 INT
- MIA – Dan Marino – 23/42, 473 yards, 5 TD, INT

Top rushers

- NE – Marion Butts – 15 rushes, 25 yards
- MIA – Terry Kirby – 19 rushes, 56 yards

Top receivers

- NE – Ben Coates – 8 receptions, 161 yards, 2 TD
- MIA – Irving Fryar – 5 receptions, 211 yards, 3 TD

The debut game of Robert Kraft as team owner. Drew Bledsoe and Dan Marino put on a passing clinic, combining for 894 passing yards and nine touchdowns (two caught by Ben Coates of the Patriots and three snared by Irving Fryar of the Dolphins). The game was Marino's first game back from a ruptured Achilles tendon. The Dolphins won 39–35 after the Patriots drive stalled at midfield in the final minute. On the Patriots‘ previous drive Ben Coates fumbled the ball after a big gain and the Dolphins recovered.

==== Week 2: vs. Buffalo Bills ====
Week 2: Buffalo Bills at New England Patriots – Game summary

Quarter	1	2	3	4	Total
Bills	14	14	0	10	38
Patriots	7	7	7	14	35

at Foxboro Stadium, Foxborough, Massachusetts

- Date: September 11
- Game time: 1:00 p.m. EDT
- Game weather: 62 °F (17 °C)
- Game attendance: 60,274
- Referee: Dale Hamer
- TV announcers (NBC): Don Criqui and Beasley Reece
- Box score

Game information

First quarter

- BUF – Andre Reed 37-yard pass from Jim Kelly (Steve Christie kick). Bills 7–0.
- BUF – Thurman Thomas 4-yard pass from Jim Kelly (Steve Christie kick). Bills 14–0.
- NE – Ben Coates 18-yard pass from Drew Bledsoe (Matt Bahr kick). Bills 14–7.

Second quarter

- BUF – Bill Brooks 12-yard pass from Jim Kelly (Steve Christie kick). Bills 21–7.
- NE – Ben Coates 5-yard pass from Drew Bledsoe (Matt Bahr kick). Bills 21–14.
- BUF – Don Beebee 14-yard pass from Jim Kelly (Steve Christie kick). Bills 28–14.

Third quarter

- NE – Marion Butts 19-yard run (Matt Bahr kick). Bills 28–21.

Fourth quarter

- BUF – Mike Lodish 0-yard fumble return (Steve Christie kick). Bills 35–21.
- NE – Michael Timpson 21-yard pass from Drew Bledsoe (Matt Bahr kick). Bills 35–28.
- NE – Marion Butts 6-yard run (Matt Bahr kick). Tied 35–35.
- BUF – Steve Christie 32-yard field goal. Bills 38–35.

Top passers

- BUF – Jim Kelly – 25/41, 328 yards, 4 TD, 3 INT
- NE – Drew Bledsoe – 26/42, 380 yards, 3 TD, 2 INT

Top rushers

- BUF – Thurman Thomas – 26 rushes, 106 yards
- NE – Marion Butts – 18 rushes, 82 yards, 2 TD

Top receivers

- BUF – Andre Reed – 7 receptions, 142 yards, TD
- NE – Ben Coates – 9 receptions, 124 yards, 2 TD

The debut home game under Kraft's ownership, the Patriots rallied from down 35–21 in the fourth quarter as a Michael Timpson touchdown catch and Marion Butts rushing score tied the game, but Steve Christie's 32-yard field goal won the game for Buffalo 38–35.

==== Week 3: at Cincinnati Bengals ====
- September 18 at Cincinnati Bengals:

The Patriots debuted their throwback uniforms and helmets, returning the Pat Patriot logo after it was retired following the 1992 season. David Klingler of the Bengals threw two touchdowns to Carl Pickens and Steve Broussard ran in two scores for the Bengals, but Klingler was sacked seven times and the Patriots behind Drew Bledsoe's 365 passing yards to Michael Timpson (125 yards with a 34-yard touchdown catch) and Ben Coates, two Marion Butts touchdown runs, and four Matt Bahr field goals overcame the Bengals for a 31–28 win, the Patriots' first under Robert Kraft ownership.

==== Week 4: at Detroit Lions ====
- September 25 at Detroit Lions:

The Patriots raced to a 20–7 lead and withstood a late Lions rally to win 23–17. Barry Sanders put on an impressive performance in the loss, rushing for 131 yards (outperforming the entire Patriots offensive backfield's 108 combined yards); NFL Films caught in slow motion a twisting Sanders run in which he shook off Patriots defenders Myron Guyton and Harlon Barnett for one of his two touchdowns; the image is among the most replayed in retrospectives on Sanders' career.

==== Week 5: vs. Green Bay Packers ====
- October 2 vs. Green Bay Packers:

Both teams sported throwback uniforms, with the Packers in yellow and brown and the Patriots wearing the white road version of their AFL-era uniforms with Pat Patriot logo. The Packers stormed to a 10–0 halftime lead but two Vincent Brisby touchdown catches and a last-minute Matt Bahr field goal rallied the Patriots to a 17–16 win.

==== Week 6: vs. Los Angeles Raiders ====
- October 9 vs. Los Angeles Raiders:

Drew Bledsoe threw two touchdowns in the second quarter for a 17–7 Patriots lead but the Raiders rallied behind three Bledsoe INTs (the first run back for a score by Terry McDaniel) and two Jeff Hostetler touchdowns (one on the ground) to win 21–17. Kevin Turner was drilled in mid-air diving for the goalline late in the fourth quarter; though it appeared he'd broken the goalline plane the ball was knocked out of his hands and recovered by the Raiders. This would be the Patriots last loss at home against the Raiders until 2025.

==== Week 7: at New York Jets ====
- October 16 @ New York Jets:

Two Brad Baxter touchdowns and a score from Boomer Esiason put the Jets up 21–7 at the half. Former Jet Blair Thomas scored in the fourth but the Patriots could not get closer than a 24–17 loss.

==== Week 9: vs. Miami Dolphins ====
- October 30 vs. Miami Dolphins:

Despite two interceptions Dan Marino had more passing yards (198) than the Patriots had yards of offense (188). Drew Bledsoe had a terrible day with three interceptions and just 125 yards; backup Scott Zolak finished the game with 28 passing yards.

==== Week 10: at Cleveland Browns ====
- November 6 @ Cleveland Browns:

In what turned out to be a playoff preview, Bill Parcells faced his former defensive assistant Bill Belichick and the 6–2 Browns. Belichick's defense harassed Drew Bledsoe all game, forcing four interceptions and limiting the Patriots to just two Matt Bahr field goals while Leroy Hoard rushed for 123 yards and caught a one-yard Mark Rypien touchdown pass. The 13–6 loss dropped the Patriots to 3–6.

==== Week 11: vs. Minnesota Vikings ====
Week 11: Minnesota Vikings at New England Patriots – Game summary

Quarter	1	2	3	4	OT	Total
Vikings	10	10	0	0	0	20
Patriots	0	3	7	10	6	26

at Foxboro Stadium, Foxborough, Massachusetts

- Date: November 13
- Game time: 1:00 p.m. EST
- Game weather: 48 °F (9 °C)
- Game attendance: 58,382
- Box score

Game information

First quarter

- MIN – Terry Allen 2-yard run (Fuad Reveiz kick). Vikings 7–0.
- MIN – Fuad Reveiz 40-yard field goal. Vikings 10–0.

Second quarter

- MIN – Qadry Ismail 65-yard pass from Warren Moon (Fuad Reveiz kick). Vikings 17–0.
- MIN – Fuad Reveiz 33-yard field goal. Vikings 20–0.
- NE – Matt Bahr 38-yard field goal. Vikings 20–3.

Third quarter

- NE – Ray Crittenden 31-yard pass from Drew Bledsoe (Matt Bahr kick). Vikings 20–10.

Fourth quarter

- NE – Leroy Thompson 5-yard pass from Drew Bledsoe (Matt Bahr kick). Vikings 20–17.
- NE – Matt Bahr 23-yard field goal. Tied 20–20.

Overtime

- NE – Kevin Turner 14-yard pass from Drew Bledsoe. Patriots 26–20.

Top passers

- MIN – Warren Moon – 26/42, 349 yards, TD
- NE – Drew Bledsoe – 45/70, 426 yards, 3 TD

Top rushers

- MIN – Terry Allen – 23 rushes, 75 yards, TD
- NE – Marion Butts – 6 rushes, 26 yards

Top receivers

- MIN – Qadry Ismail – 4 receptions, 89 yards, TD
- NE – Michael Timpson – 10 receptions, 113 yards

Former Oilers quarterback Warren Moon led the Vikings to a 20–3 halftime lead, but in the third Bill Parcells abandoned his gameplan and went to a no-huddle attack. Drew Bledsoe threw touchdowns to Ray Crittenden and Leroy Thompson, the Patriots defense shut down the Vikings (the key play came with 2:04 to go in the fourth when Maurice Hurst swatted away a pass for Qadry Ismail). On the final drive Bledsoe was blitzed three straight downs but facing 4th and 10 from his 35 completed a 27-yard strike to Vincent Brisby, and Matt Bahr, after missing a field goal attempt late in the third quarter, kicked the tying field goal with 14 seconds left in regulation. On the coin toss for overtime Patriots captain Vincent Brown protested the Vikings team captain's call because he called after the coin landed on the ground. The Patriots won the re-toss and Bledsoe led the Patriots down field and lobbed a 14-yard touchdown toss to Kevin Turner. The 26–20 win ended a four-game losing streak. Moon threw for 349 yards while Bledsoe (426 yards) set NFL single-game records with 70 throws and 45 completions. Bledsoe’s record of 45 completions was broken in 2025 by another quarterback who first began with the Patriots Jacoby Brissett in 2025 against the Forty Niners.

==== Week 12: vs. San Diego Chargers ====
- November 20 vs. San Diego Chargers:

The rejuvenated Patriots raced to a 13–3 second-quarter lead as Leroy Thompson caught a 27-yard touchdown from Drew Bledsoe in the first quarter to go with two Matt Bahr field goals, but the Chargers scored after Bahr's second field goal as Andre Coleman ran back the ensuing kick 80 yards for a touchdown. The Patriots finally put the game away in the fourth on a one-yard Marion Butts score and another Bahr field goal, offsetting a Tony Martin touchdown catch from Stan Humphries.

==== Week 13: at Indianapolis Colts ====
- November 27 at Indianapolis Colts:

The Colts, clawing to a .500 season, hosted the Patriots on Sunday Night and limited New England to four Matt Bahr field goals, but despite 186 yards and a touchdown by Don Majkowski to go with 132 rushing yards by Majkowski, Marshall Faulk, and Roosevelt Potts, the Colts fell 12–10 as the Patriots recovered two Indianapolis fumbles, on off a botched lateral.

==== Week 14: vs. New York Jets ====
- December 4 vs. New York Jets:

One week after the epic "Fake Spike" meltdown against the Miami Dolphins the Jets' season-ending losing streak continued while the Patriots ended a three-game losing streak to the Jets with a 24–13 win in Foxboro Stadium. The Jets led 13–10 in the third quarter but the Patriots pinned Boomer Esiason at his own goalline, then Ricky Reynolds ran back an interception for a touchdown. A Leroy Thompson touchdown in the fourth quarter finished off the Jets as Esiason ended with just 16 completions for 40 throws. The loss was Jets coach Pete Carroll's last trip to Foxboro until he became Patriots head coach in 1997.

==== Week 15: vs. Indianapolis Colts ====
- December 11 vs. Indianapolis Colts:

The Colts raced to a 10–0 lead as Drew Bledsoe was intercepted at the Indianapolis 10 and Ray Buchanan ran back a 90-yard touchdown, but from there Don Majkowski was intercepted twice, Bledsoe (despite four interceptions) tossed touchdowns to Leroy Thompson and Ben Coates, Thompson and Marion Butts scored on the ground, and the Patriots grabbed two more fumbles for a 28–13 win. The Patriots were now 8–6 and still in the hunt for a playoff spot while the Colts fell to 6–8.

==== Week 16: at Buffalo Bills ====
- December 18 at Buffalo Bills:

The Patriots fell behind 17–3 in the second quarter, then scored 38 unanswered points for a 41–17 rout. The win knocked the Bills out of the playoffs after four straight Super Bowl trips.

==== Week 17: at Chicago Bears ====
- December 24 at Chicago Bears:

Needing a win to make the playoffs, the Patriots overtook the Bears 13–3, for their seventh consecutive win and ending their regular season at 10–6. It was their first playoff appearance since 1986 and first double-digit win season since that year as well.

=== Postseason ===
==== AFC Wild Card Playoffs: at (4) Cleveland Browns ====
AFC Wild Card Playoffs: (5) New England Patriots at (4) Cleveland Browns – Game summary

Quarter	1	2	3	4	Total
Patriots	0	10	0	3	13
Browns	3	7	7	3	20

at Cleveland Municipal Stadium, Cleveland, Ohio

- Date: January 1, 1995
- Game time: 12:30 p.m. EST
- Game weather: Cloudy, 40 °F (4 °C)
- Game attendance: 77,452
- Referee: Bernie Kukar
- TV announcers (NBC): Dick Enberg and Bob Trumpy
- Box score

Game information

First quarter

- CLE – Matt Stover 30-yard field goal. Browns 3–0.

Second quarter

- NE – Leroy Thompson 13-yard pass from Drew Bledsoe (Matt Bahr kick). Patriots 7–3.
- CLE – Mark Carrier 5-yard pass from Vinny Testaverde (Matt Stover kick). Browns 10–7.
- NE – Matt Bahr 23-yard field goal. Tied 10–10.

Third quarter

- CLE – Leroy Hoard 10-yard run (Matt Stover kick). Browns 17–10.

Fourth quarter

- CLE – Matt Stover 21-yard field goal. Browns 20–10.
- NE – Matt Bahr 33-yard field goal. Browns 20–13.

Top passers

- NE – Drew Bledsoe – 21/50, 235 yards, TD, 3 INT
- CLE – Vinny Testaverde – 20/30, 268 yards, TD

Top rushers

- NE – Corey Croom – 9 rushes, 35 yards
- CLE – Leroy Hoard – 17 rushes, 66 yards, TD

Top receivers

- NE – Vincent Brisby – 6 receptions, 83 yards
- CLE – Michael Jackson – 7 receptions, 122 yards

After seven dramatic victories in a row, the Patriots fell flat in a 20–13 loss in their first playoff game since 1986. Drew Bledsoe was picked off three times despite a game-tying rally in the second quarter; he threw the ball 50 times but completed just 22 passes. Leroy Hoard and Earnest Byner totaled 96 rushing yards, outrushing the entire Patriots offensive backfield (57 yards). The win was the first in a playoff game for Browns head coach Bill Belichick. The Patriots successfully executed an onsides kick in this game; they would not succeed with another onsides kick until 2013, coincidentally against the Browns.

== See also ==
- New England Patriots seasons
