= Clock Play =

Famous trick play in American football

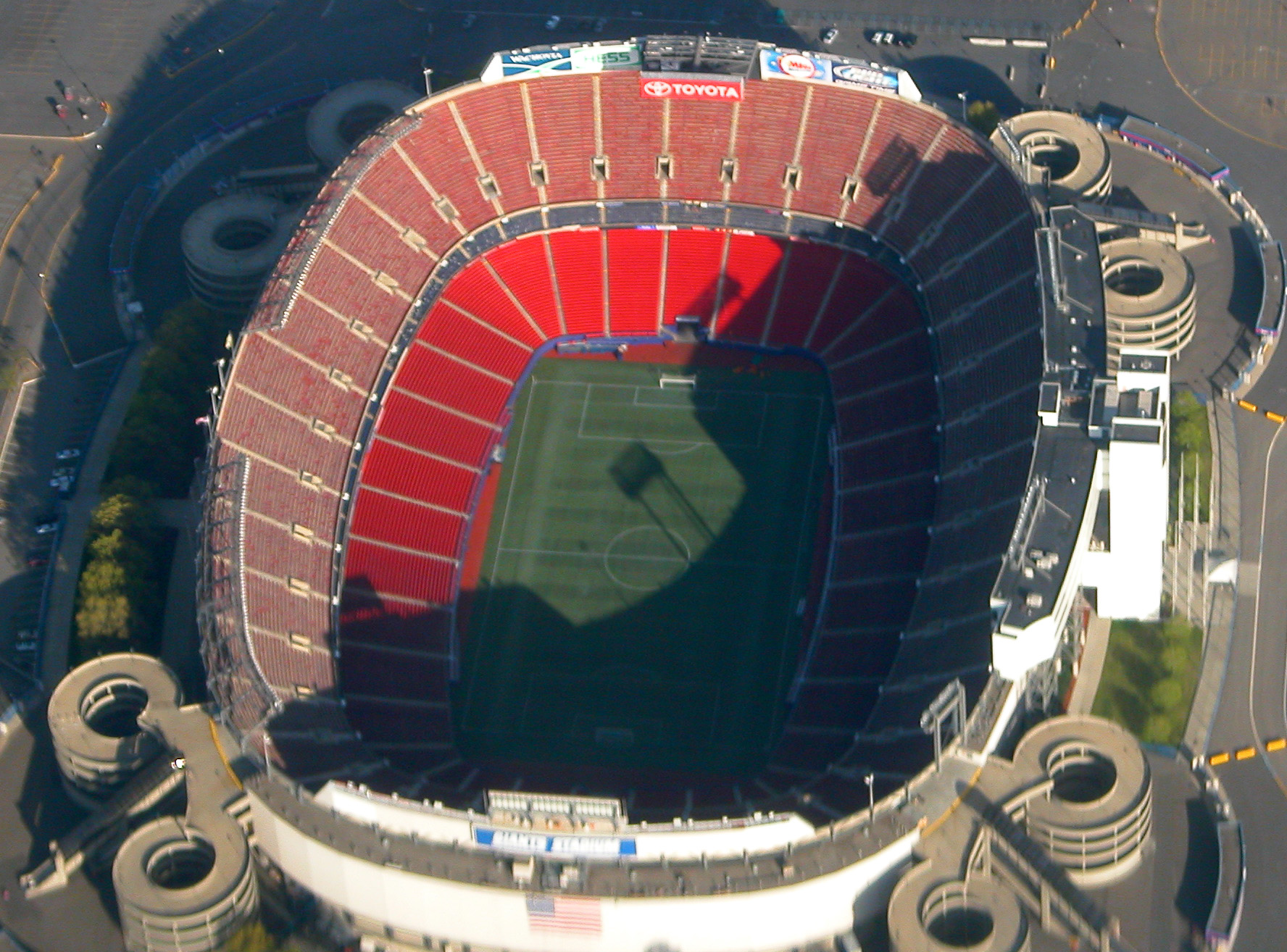
- Giants Stadium, the site of the game.
Miami Dolphins (7–4)	New York Jets (6–5)
28	24
Head coach: Don Shula	Head coach: Pete Carroll
	1	2	3	4	Total
MIA	0	0	14	14	28
NYJ	3	7	14	0	24
- Date: November 27, 1994
- Stadium: Giants Stadium; East Rutherford, New Jersey
- Referee: Gary Lane
- Attendance: 75,606

TV in the United States
- Network: NBC
- Announcers: Marv Albert and Paul Maguire

The Clock Play was a famous trick play in American football, immortalized in what came to be known as the Fake Spike Game, played on November 27, 1994. The contest was played by the National Football League (NFL)'s Miami Dolphins and New York Jets that featured one of the most famous comeback plays in league history. Dolphins quarterback Dan Marino ran a trick play, pretending to stop the game clock but instead threw a pass that scored the game-winning touchdown, ultimately giving Miami the 28–24 victory.

== Summary ==
The game itself pitted the 7–4 Dolphins against the 6–5 Jets; entering this game the Dolphins and Jets led the AFC East, but all five teams in the division were within two games of the division lead; the Bills had fallen to 6–6 following a Thanksgiving Day loss in Detroit while the Patriots had begun a late-season surge following victories over the Vikings and San Diego and were 5–6 facing the 5–6 Colts that same Sunday. The Jets were coming off a victory at Minnesota while the Dolphins had suffered back-to-back losses to Chicago and Pittsburgh.

The Jets raced to a 17–0 lead before the Dolphins got on the board on Dan Marino's touchdown to Mark Ingram Sr., but misfired on a two-point conversion. The Jets scored again on Johnny Mitchell's touchdown catch before Marino found Ingram again, and this time, connected on another two-point conversion try, this one going to Irving Fryar. In the fourth, Boomer Esiason was intercepted for the first time; this set up a third Marino-to-Ingram score. The Dolphins blitzed Esiason and Tim Bowens forced a fumble recovered by the Jets; this forced a Jets punt, but O. J. McDuffie fumbled the punt to the Jets. The Jets drove to the Miami 38 with six minutes left but Esiason was intercepted again. The Jets forced another Miami punt, but with 2:34 left, J. B. Brown picked off Esiason again.

Trailing 24–21 with 38 seconds left, the Dolphins had the ball at the Jets' 8-yard line with only one timeout. Running to the line of scrimmage, Marino nodded to Ingram and yelled "Clock! Clock! Clock!" and motioned that he was going to spike the ball to stop the clock. The Jets defense, anticipating a spike, relaxed. Marino took the snap; instead of spiking the ball, he dropped back to pass, while Ingram ran to the corner of the end zone with rookie Jets cornerback Aaron Glenn biting on the fake. With the Jets caught off-guard, Marino threw the pass to Ingram in the front-right corner of the end zone. The play was brought to Miami earlier in the year by backup quarterback Bernie Kosar, and Dolphins coach Don Shula decided it was the right time to use the trick play.

The 28–24 victory moved the Dolphins to 8–4 and despite subsequent losses to Buffalo and Indianapolis the 10–6 Dolphins edged the 10–6 Patriots, who had won their last seven games, for the division title (winning on a season sweep of New England), the twelfth in the team's history. The Dolphins defeated the Kansas City Chiefs in the Wild Card Game 27-17 but lost in the divisional round to the San Diego Chargers, 22–21.

The comeback was Marino's 29th in his career, and his fifth against the Jets.

=== Aftermath ===
The Jets, meanwhile, went into a tailspin. Coach Pete Carroll called the loss "staggering." It proved to be more than that. The loss set off the Jets' second straight December collapse; they would not win another game for the rest of the season, and Coach Carroll was then fired. But the Jets' slump continued under his successor, Rich Kotite; they would win only four games during Kotite's two seasons, including a franchise worst 1–15 record in 1996.

== Officials ==
- Referee: Gary Lane (#120)
- Umpire: Bob Boylston (#101)
- Head linesman: Sanford Rivers (#121)
- Line judge: Jeff Bergman (#32)
- Back judge: Bill Lovett (#98)
- Side judge: Don Wedge (#28)
- Field judge: Bobby Skelton (#73)

== Broadcast call on the play ==
Maguire: Marino's trying to get everybody on the line of scrimmage. Now he still has one timeout. They'll save that for the field goal, if they have to.
Albert: We are seeing another spectacular effort by Marino, who fires... TOUCHDOWN!

— NBC's Marv Albert and Paul Maguire calling the play

== See also ==
- Dolphins–Jets rivalry
