= List of most watched United States television broadcasts of 1995 =

The following is a list of most watched United States television broadcasts of 1995.

== Most watched by week ==
Broadcast (primetime only)
Week of	Title	Network	Viewers (in millions)	Ref.
January 2	Chargers vs. Dolphins (NFL)	NBC	46.7	
January 9	NFC Championship	Fox	60.6	
January 16	Seinfeld	NBC	36.2	
January 23	Super Bowl XXIX	ABC	83.4	
January 30	Seinfeld	NBC	34.0	
January 30	ER	NBC	34.0	
February 6	ER	NBC	34.2	
February 13	Seinfeld	NBC	33.4	
February 20	ER	NBC	35.0	
February 27	Home Improvement	ABC	33.9	
March 6	ER	NBC	34.4	
March 13	Home Improvement	ABC	32.9	
March 20	Home Improvement	ABC	31.7	
March 27	67th Academy Awards	ABC	48.3	
April 3	ER	NBC	35.3	
April 10	Home Improvement	ABC	33.6	
April 17	Seinfeld	NBC	27.7	
April 24	ER	NBC	33.5	
May 1	NBC Sunday Night Movie	NBC	39.1	
May 8	ER	NBC	33.1	
May 15	ER	NBC	33.6	
May 22	Home Improvement	ABC	31.4	
May 29	Grace Under Fire	ABC	19.5	
June 5	Friends	NBC	21.7	
June 12	Primetime Live	ABC	37.5	
June 19	Friends	NBC	21.3	
June 26	Friends	NBC	24.6	
July 3	Friends	NBC	21.3	
July 10	Friends	NBC	22.6	
July 17	Friends	NBC	23.5	
July 24	Friends	NBC	24.9	
July 31	Seinfeld	NBC	23.0	
August 7	Friends	NBC	24.0	
August 14	Friends	NBC	22.7	
August 21	Seinfeld	NBC	24.5	
August 28	Seinfeld	NBC	23.4	
September 4	Home Improvement	ABC	25.0	
September 11	Home Improvement	ABC	25.4	
1995–96 television season begins
September 18	Seinfeld	NBC	37.6	
September 25	Seinfeld	NBC	34.5	
October 2	ER	NBC	35.6	
October 9	ER	NBC	35.5	
October 16	ER	NBC	35.3	
October 23	World Series (Game 5)	ABC	31.7	
October 30	ER	NBC	35.3	
November 6	ER	NBC	42.0	
November 13	ER	NBC	39.4	
November 20	ER	NBC	31.4	
November 27	Seinfeld	NBC	27.7	
December 4	ER	NBC	35.0	
December 11	ER	NBC	34.9	
December 18	ER	NBC	25.4	
December 25	ER	NBC	25.4	
December 25	Monday Night Football	ABC	25.4	
