= Michael Timpson =

American football player and sprinter (born 1967)

No. 45, 83, 12
- Position: Wide receiver

Personal information
- Born: June 6, 1967 (age 59); Baxley, Georgia, U.S.
- Listed height: 5 ft 11 in (1.80 m)
- Listed weight: 180 lb (82 kg)

Career information
- High school: Hialeah-Miami Lakes (FL)
- College: Penn State
- NFL draft: 1989: 4th round, 100th overall pick

Career history
- New England Patriots (1989–1994); Chicago Bears (1995–1996); Philadelphia Eagles (1997)

Awards and highlights
- National champion (1986)

Career NFL statistics
- Receptions: 300
- Receiving yards: 4,047
- Receiving touchdowns: 12
- Stats at Pro Football Reference

Michael Dwain Timpson (born June 6, 1967) is an American former professional football player and sprinter.

== Early life ==
Timpson was a track star and multi-sport athlete at Hialeah-Miami Lakes High School in Hialeah, Florida from 1981 to 1985. He won seven track and field titles in high school. Four of those titles were won his senior year at the same track meet. He recorded three state records that day. He was an All-American in track and football.

== Professional career ==
He was selected by the New England Patriots in the fourth round (100th overall), 14th wide receiver taken in the 1989 NFL draft, and played for them from 1989 to 1994. He played with the Chicago Bears in 1995 and 1996, and finished his career with the Philadelphia Eagles in 1997. He retired in 1999.

== NFL career statistics ==
Legend
**Bold**	Career high

=== Regular season ===
Year	Team	Games		Receiving				
Year	Team	GP	GS	Rec	Yds	Avg	Lng	TD
1989	NWE	2	0	0	0	0.0	0	0
1990	NWE	5	0	5	91	18.2	42	0
1991	NWE	**16**	2	25	471	**18.8**	**60**	2
1992	NWE	**16**	2	26	315	12.1	25	1
1993	NWE	**16**	7	42	654	15.6	48	2
1994	NWE	15	14	**74**	**941**	12.7	37	**3**
1995	CHI	**16**	1	24	289	12.0	36	2
1996	CHI	15	**15**	62	802	12.9	49	0
1997	PHI	15	10	42	484	11.5	26	2
		116	51	300	4,047	13.5	60	12

=== Playoffs ===
Year	Team	Games		Receiving				
Year	Team	GP	GS	Rec	Yds	Avg	Lng	TD
1994	NWE	1	1	2	20	10.0	13	0
		1	1	2	20	10.0	13	0

== Track and field ==
Timpson was an outstanding All-American track and field athlete at Penn State University. He holds the school records in the following events:

- 200 meters: 20.23 (1986)
- 55 Meters (Indoors): 6.31 (1986)
- 200 Meters (Indoors): 21.11 (1989)
- 300 Meters (Indoors): 33.01 (1986)
- 400 Meters (Indoors): 46.81 (1987)
- 55-Meter High Hurdles (Indoors): 7.31 (1986)

His time of 33.01 in the indoor 300 Meters, was an NCAA record. In 1992, he participated in the U.S. Olympic trials in the 200 meters and was a semifinalist.

== Personal ==
Timpson resides in Orlando, Florida with his wife and their two children.
