= Adam Walker (American football, born 1968) =

American football player (born 1968)

No. 30, 27, 29
- Position: Running back

Personal information
- Born: June 7, 1968 (age 58); Homestead, Pennsylvania, U.S.
- Listed height: 6 ft 1 in (1.85 m)
- Listed weight: 210 lb (95 kg)

Career information
- High school: Steel Valley
- College: Pittsburgh
- NFL draft: 1990: undrafted

Career history
- Philadelphia Eagles (1990)*; San Francisco 49ers (1991–1993); Ohio Glory (1992); Green Bay Packers (1994)*; San Francisco 49ers (1994-1995); Philadelphia Eagles (1996)
- * Offseason or practice squad member only

Awards and highlights
- Super Bowl champion (XXIX)

Career NFL statistics
- Rushing yards: 115
- Rushing average: 3.6
- Rushing touchdowns: 2
- Stats at Pro Football Reference

Adam Walker (born June 7, 1968) is an American former professional football player who was a running back for five seasons with the San Francisco 49ers and Philadelphia Eagles of the National Football League (NFL). He played college football for the Pittsburgh Panthers.

Walker is the Chief Executive Officer of Summit Packaging Solutions. The University of Pittsburgh Board of Trustees elected Walker a trustee in 2019. In 2022 he was appointed to Peach Bowl, Inc.'s Board of Trustees.
