= Kevin Turner (running back) =

American football player (1969–2016)

No. 34
- Position: Fullback

Personal information
- Born: June 12, 1969; Prattville, Alabama, U.S.
- Died: March 24, 2016 (aged 46); Vestavia Hills, Alabama, U.S.
- Listed height: 6 ft 1 in (1.85 m)
- Listed weight: 231 lb (105 kg)

Career information
- High school: Prattville
- College: Alabama
- NFL draft: 1992: 3rd round, 71st overall pick

Career history
- New England Patriots (1992–1994); Philadelphia Eagles (1995–1999)

Career NFL statistics
- Rushing yards: 635
- Rushing average: 4
- Rushing touchdowns: 1
- Receptions: 236
- Receiving yards: 2,015
- Receiving touchdowns: 10
- Stats at Pro Football Reference

Paul Kevin Turner (June 12, 1969 – March 24, 2016) was an American professional football player who was a fullback for eight seasons in the National Football League (NFL) for the New England Patriots and Philadelphia Eagles. He played college football for the Alabama Crimson Tide. Turner died after suffering from amyotrophic lateral sclerosis (ALS) for several years. The illness had been triggered by chronic traumatic encephalopathy (CTE).

== Career ==
Turner attended Prattville High School in Prattville, Alabama. Playing for the school's football team, Turner was a member of the 1984 Alabama state champions. He enrolled at the University of Alabama, where he played college football for the Alabama Crimson Tide. With the Crimson Tide, Turner was regarded as a strong blocker, supporting running backs Siran Stacy and Bobby Humphrey. He also rushed for 4.7 yards (4.3 m) per carry and had 95 receptions.

The New England Patriots of the National Football League (NFL) selected him in the third round of the 1992 NFL draft. Turner played for New England for three seasons, and then played for five seasons with the Philadelphia Eagles. Turner missed the majority of the 1995 season due to a knee injury. When he came back the following year, he blocked for Ricky Watters, who led the NFL in rushing yards. Turner won the Ed Block Courage Award for his persistence through the injury. He experienced two neck injuries in 1999, which ended his career. He finished his NFL career with 635 rushing yards (4.0 yards per carry), 236 receptions for 2,015 yards, and 10 touchdowns.

== NFL career statistics ==
Legend
**Bold**	Career high

=== Regular season ===
Year	Team	Games		Rushing					Receiving				
Year	Team	GP	GS	Att	Yds	Avg	Lng	TD	Rec	Yds	Avg	Lng	TD
1992	NWE	16	1	10	40	4.0	11	0	7	52	7.4	19	2
1993	NWE	16	9	**50**	**231**	4.6	**49**	0	39	333	8.5	26	2
1994	NWE	16	9	36	111	3.1	13	**1**	**52**	**471**	9.1	32	2
1995	PHI	2	2	2	9	4.5	12	0	4	29	7.3	11	0
1996	PHI	16	12	18	39	2.2	7	0	43	409	**9.5**	**41**	1
1997	PHI	16	10	18	96	**5.3**	29	0	48	443	9.2	36	**3**
1998	PHI	16	15	20	94	4.7	19	0	34	232	6.8	18	0
1999	PHI	8	7	6	15	2.5	5	0	9	46	5.1	14	0
Career		106	65	160	635	4.0	49	1	236	2,015	8.5	41	10

=== Playoffs ===
Year	Team	Games		Rushing					Receiving				
Year	Team	GP	GS	Att	Yds	Avg	Lng	TD	Rec	Yds	Avg	Lng	TD
1994	NWE	1	0	1	**4**	**4.0**	**4**	0	1	7	7.0	7	0
1996	PHI	1	1	**3**	**4**	1.3	**4**	0	**2**	**18**	**9.0**	**11**	0
Career		2	1	4	8	2.0	4	0	3	25	8.3	11	0

== Personal life ==
Turner and his first wife, Joyce Labbe of Auburn, Maine, had three children: Nolan, Natalie, and Cole. They divorced . As of December 2018, Turner's son Nolan is a college football player for the Clemson Tigers football team. Clemson head coach Dabo Swinney was a teammate of Turner's in college.

== Health issues ==
In June 2010, Turner was diagnosed with Amyotrophic Lateral Sclerosis (ALS), and agreed to donate his brain and spinal cord when he died. Turner served as a lead plaintiff in a major lawsuit filed by former players against the NFL regarding the health risks of concussions in American football.

Turner's life with ALS was documented in the music video for the song "Journey On" by Ty Herndon. Turner and his two children appeared in the music video along with Herndon. In 2012, Jon Frankel of HBO worked with Turner to create the documentary film American Man, describing Turner's life, especially his battle with ALS.

On March 24, 2016, Turner died in his home in Vestavia Hills, Alabama. On November 3 of that year, Boston University Brain CTE Center announced that Turner had a severe case of chronic traumatic encephalopathy (CTE), which led to his death. Multiple news outlets reported that CTE killed Turner, not ALS.

The following day, the Boston University School of Medicine posted on its Facebook Page, "The VA-BU-CLF Brain Bank issued the following statement: To clarify conflicting media reports, #KevinTurner died of #ALS. ALS is a clinical diagnosis defined by the loss of movement through the degeneration of motor neuron cells. There are many known causes of ALS, specifically genetic and environmental causes, but most ALS cases are of idiopathic, or unknown, origin. By studying his brain, researchers at the VA, Boston University School of Medicine and Concussion Legacy Foundation discovered that the cause of Kevin Turner’s ALS was motor neuron cell death triggered by CTE, which is a pathological diagnosis. His clinical diagnosis remains ALS."

Turner is one of at least 345 NFL players to be diagnosed after death with chronic traumatic encephalopathy (CTE), which is caused by repeated hits to the head.
