= Kevin Lee (American football) =

American football player (born 1971)

No. 86, 17
- Position: Wide receiver

Personal information
- Born: January 1, 1971 (age 55); Mobile, Alabama, U.S.
- Listed height: 6 ft 1 in (1.85 m)
- Listed weight: 194 lb (88 kg)

Career information
- High school: Prichard (AL) Vigor
- College: Alabama
- NFL draft: 1994: 2nd round, 35th overall pick

Career history
- New England Patriots (1994–1995); San Francisco 49ers (1996); St. Louis Rams (1997)*; Rhein Fire (1998); Jacksonville Jaguars (1998)*; Mobile Admirals (1999); Carolina Cobras (2000)
- * Offseason or practice squad member only

Awards and highlights
- National champion (1992)

Career NFL statistics
- Receptions: 8
- Yards: 107
- Stats at Pro Football Reference

Career AFL statistics
- Receptions: 2
- Yards: 11
- Touchdowns: 1
- Stats at ArenaFan.com

Kevin DeWayne Lee (born January 1, 1971) is an American former professional football player who was a wide receiver in the National Football League (NFL) and Arena Football League (AFL).

Lee played college football for the Alabama Crimson Tide and was selected 35th overall by the New England Patriots in the second round of the 1994 NFL draft. He spent two seasons with the Patriots, appearing in seven games in 1995, and played in two games for the San Francisco 49ers in 1996. Lee also played in NFL Europe for the Rhein Fire, in the short-lived Regional Football League for the Mobile Admirals, and in the AFL for the Carolina Cobras.
