= Blair Thomas =

American football player and coach (born 1967)

No. 32, 31
- Position: Running back

Personal information
- Born: October 7, 1967 (age 59); Philadelphia, Pennsylvania, U.S.
- Listed height: 5 ft 10 in (1.78 m)
- Listed weight: 202 lb (92 kg)

Career information
- High school: Frankford (Philadelphia)
- College: Penn State
- NFL draft: 1990: 1st round, 2nd overall pick

Career history

Playing
- New York Jets (1990–1993); New England Patriots (1994); Dallas Cowboys (1994); Atlanta Falcons (1995)*; Carolina Panthers (1995)
- * Offseason or practice squad member only

Coaching
- Temple University (1998–2005)

Awards and highlights
- National champion (1986); First-team All-American (1989); Third-team All-American (1987); 2× First-team All-East (1987, 1989); Holiday Bowl MVP (1989); Senior Bowl MVP (1990); Pennsylvania Sports Hall of Fame (2011)

Career NFL statistics
- Rushing yards: 2,236
- Rushing average: 4.2
- Receptions: 71
- Receiving yards: 513
- Total touchdowns: 9
- Stats at Pro Football Reference

Blair Lamar Thomas (born October 7, 1967) is an American former professional football player who was a running back in the National Football League (NFL) for the New York Jets, New England Patriots, Dallas Cowboys, Atlanta Falcons and Carolina Panthers. He played college football for the Penn State Nittany Lions, earning first-team All-American honors in 1989.

== Early life ==
Thomas attended Frankford High School in Philadelphia. As a senior, he rushed for 1,551 yards and 24 touchdowns, while helping his team win the Public League title and receiving All-state honors.

In three seasons at Frankford, he set the Public League rushing record with 3,941 yards and tied the Public League career record with 59 touchdowns.

== College career ==
Thomas accepted a football scholarship from Penn State University. As a freshman in 1985, he saw limited action as a backup running back, registering 14 carries for 42 yards (3-yard avg.) and no touchdowns.

As a sophomore in 1986, he was one of the main backup running backs behind D.J. Dozier on the 1986 National Championship team, tallying 504 yards (third on the team), 60 carries (fourth on the team) and 5 rushing touchdowns (second on the team). He also broke Lenny Moore's school record of 8.0 yards per carry with an 8.4-yard average.

As a junior in 1987, he was named the starter and led the team with 268 carries for 1,414 yard and 11 rushing touchdowns, while tallying 23 catches for 300 yards and 2 receiving touchdowns. He had a career-high 35 carries for 214 yards in the 21–20 win over the University of Notre Dame. He suffered a serious right knee injury during an informal workout prior to the Citrus Bowl at the end of the season. He spent the 1988 season rehabilitating his knee.

As a senior returning from reconstructive knee surgery, he averaged just 19 carries in the first 6 games, but ended strong by rushing for over 100-yards in six straight games, while registering 1,341 yards on 264 carries and 5 touchdowns. In the 16–17 loss against the University of Alabama, Thomas was given the ball eleven times in a row in the fourth quarter and managed to score the potential tying touchdown, but the extra point was blocked. In the Holiday Bowl against Brigham Young, he rushed for a bowl record 186 yards on 35 carries, receiving Most Valuable Player honors. He was also named the MVP in the Senior Bowl after rushing for 137 yards on only 11 carries.

He finished second on the Nittany Lions' all-time rushing list with 3,301 yards and 21 touchdowns, just 97 yards shy of the Penn State record set by Curt Warner. He averaged 5.5 yards per carry. He was also the first player in school history to rush for more than 1,300 yards in two seasons (1987, 1989). He earned his Bachelor of Science in recreation and parks management at Penn State University in 1989.

In 2011, he was inducted into the Pennsylvania Sports Hall of Fame.

== Professional career ==
=== New York Jets ===
Thomas was selected by the New York Jets in the first round (second overall) of the 1990 NFL draft. He was given the number 32, which no Jet had worn since the retirement of Emerson Boozer in 1975, with the expectation of developing into a great player. As a rookie, he was used as part of a four-man running back rotation that included Freeman McNeil, Johnny Hector and Brad Baxter. In the third game against the New England Patriots, he had 20 carries for 100 yards. In his last 10 games of the season, he only received more than 10 carries just once, in Week 14 against the New England Patriots. He posted 620 rushing yards on only 123 carries, leading the NFL rookies in yards-per-carry (5 yards) and the AFC rookies in rushing yardage.

In 1991, head coach Bruce Coslet still used him in the same four-man running back rotation, but his carries increased to 189 (career-high), finishing with 728 rushing yards (led the team) and 3 touchdowns. His best game came against the Chicago Bears, where he had 27 carries for 125 rushing yards (career-high), but also lost a fumble, that contributed in part to the Jets squandering a 13–6 lead with 2 minutes remaining and losing 13–19 in overtime. A surprise playoff participant, the 8-8 Jets rushed for only 71 yards in a 17-10 wild-card loss against the Houston Oilers, with Thomas missing the game with an ankle injury.

In 1992, a series of injuries limited him to 9 games (7 starts), registering 440 yards on 97 carries. He missed three games with groin and hip injuries, and the last four with a sprained knee.

In 1993, the Jets traded for running back Johnny Johnson. Thomas was used in a three-man running back rotation with Johnson and Baxter. After injuring his hamstring in the fourth game and missing the next five contests, Johnson took over the starting role and went on to have 821 rushing yards, 641 receiving yards and 4 touchdowns. Thomas was hardly used in the last 6 games of the season, rushing for only 58 yards. He appeared in 11 games (5 starts), rushing for 221 yards and one touchdown in 59 carries. He became an unrestricted free agent at the end of the season.

Thomas is widely considered another in a long line of Jets draft disappointments, surpassing 100 yards rushing in just 2 games, while rushing for only 2,000 yards and five touchdowns in his four seasons with the team.

=== New England Patriots ===
On March 31, 1994, he was signed as a free agent by the New England Patriots. He sprained his ankle on the second play of the first preseason game, which forced him to be declared inactive for seven of the first 11 games of the season. He appeared in 4 games, rushing for 67 yards and one touchdown in 19 carries. On November 3, he was released to make room for defensive tackle Bruce Walker.

=== Dallas Cowboys ===
On December 1, 1994, he was signed by the Dallas Cowboys to be the backup for Emmitt Smith over the incumbent Lincoln Coleman. He started in the season finale against the New York Giants and rushed for 63 yards. In the Cowboys NFC divisional playoff game against the Green Bay Packers. Thomas took over for an injured Smith and rushed for 70 yards and two touchdowns while losing a fumble in the 35–9 win. He did not appear in the NFC Championship Game the following week; as it turned out, the NFC Divisional game was his only career appearance in a playoff game. Thomas was not re-signed after the season.

=== Atlanta Falcons ===
On June 15, 1995, he signed with the Atlanta Falcons, but was released on August 21.

=== Carolina Panthers ===
On November 7, 1995, he was signed by the Carolina Panthers for depth purposes, while starter Derrick Moore was out with a knee injury. He appeared in 7 games, tallying 22 carries for 90 yards and no touchdowns. He wasn't re-signed after the season.

== NFL career statistics ==
Year	Team	GP	Rushing						Fumbles	
Year	Team	GP	Att	Yds	Avg	Lng	TD	FD	Fum	Lost
1990	NYJ	15	123	620	5.0	41	1	0	0	0
1991	NYJ	16	189	728	3.9	25	3	41	0	0
1992	NYJ	9	97	440	4.5	19	0	25	2	2
1993	NYJ	11	59	221	3.7	24	1	8	0	0
1994	DAL	2	24	70	2.9	11	1	7	0	0
1994	NE	4	19	67	3.5	13	1	2	0	0
1995	CAR	7	22	90	4.1	13	0	6	0	0
Career		64	533	2,236	4.2	41	7	89	2	2

== Coaching career ==
Thomas served as running backs coach at Temple University for eight seasons, from 1998 to 2005. He played a key role in the development of Chicago Bears fullback Jason McKie, and Jacksonville Jaguars running back Stacey Mack. Thomas was responsible for recruiting in Philadelphia, Eastern Pennsylvania, and Southern New Jersey. He was also the team's NFL liaison and summer football camp coordinator.

Thomas also serves as a volunteer instructor for Football University. In 2008, Thomas and several other ex-NFLers, conducted a youth football camp in Barrow, Alaska. Barrow is so remote it is only accessible by airplane, and the local high school asked Football University for help with the difficult task of building a football program from scratch.

== Personal life ==
Thomas resides in King of Prussia, Pennsylvania, with his wife Lisa. He has three children: Preston, Keisha, and Blair. Thomas, former Penn State and Philadelphia Eagles wide receiver Kenny Jackson, and local AFLAC agent Al Mayer are partners in a chain of Harrisburg, Pennsylvania-area sports bars called KoKoMos.
