= Ronnie Williams (American football) =

American football player (born 1966)

No. 82, 83, 85
- Position: Tight end

Personal information
- Born: January 19, 1966 (age 60); Wichita Falls, Texas, U.S.
- Listed height: 6 ft 3 in (1.91 m)
- Listed weight: 258 lb (117 kg)

Career information
- High school: S. H. Rider (Wichita Falls, Texas)
- College: Oklahoma State
- NFL draft: 1988: undrafted

Career history
- San Diego Chargers (1988); Indianapolis Colts (1989)*; San Antonio Riders (1991-1992); Philadelphia Eagles (1992)*; New Orleans Saints (1993)*; Miami Dolphins (1993–1995); Seattle Seahawks (1996)
- * Offseason or practice squad member only

Career NFL statistics
- Receptions: 10
- Receiving yards: 79
- Touchdowns: 1
- Stats at Pro Football Reference

Ronald Williams (born January 19, 1966) is an American former professional football player who was a tight end in the National Football League (NFL) and the World League of American Football (WLAF). He played for the Miami Dolphins and Seattle Seahawks of the NFL, and the San Antonio Riders of the WLAF. Williams played collegiately at Oklahoma State University.
