= Mike Williams (wide receiver, born 1966) =

American football player (born 1966)

No. 86, 87
- Position: Wide receiver

Personal information
- Born: October 9, 1966 (age 60); Mount Kisco, New York, U.S.
- Listed height: 5 ft 10 in (1.78 m)
- Listed weight: 183 lb (83 kg)

Career information
- High school: John Jay (Cross River, New York)
- College: Northeastern
- NFL draft: 1989: 10th round, 269th overall pick

Career history
- Los Angeles Rams (1989); Detroit Lions (1989); Dallas Cowboys (1990)*; Atlanta Falcons (1991)*; Miami Dolphins (1991–1994); Jacksonville Jaguars (1995)*; Miami Dolphins (1995)
- * Offseason or practice squad member only

Career NFL statistics
- Receptions: 21
- Receiving yards: 292
- Touchdowns: 1
- Stats at Pro Football Reference

Michael J. Williams (born October 9, 1966) is an American former professional football player who was a wide receiver for six seasons in the National Football League (NFL). He played for the Detroit Lions in 1989 and the Miami Dolphins from 1991 to 1995. Williams played college football for the Northeastern Huskies and was selected in the 10th round of the 1989 NFL draft by the Los Angeles Rams with the 269th overall pick.
