= Ray Crittenden =

American football player (born 1970)

No. 81, 84, 88
- Position: Wide receiver

Personal information
- Born: March 1, 1970 (age 56); Washington, D.C., U.S.
- Listed height: 6 ft 1 in (1.85 m)
- Listed weight: 192 lb (87 kg)

Career information
- High school: Thomas Jefferson; Annandale H.S.
- College: Virginia Tech
- NFL draft: 1993: undrafted

Career history
- New England Patriots (1993–1994); Carolina Panthers (1995); San Diego Chargers (1997); Montreal Alouettes (1999)

Career NFL statistics
- Receptions: 44
- Receiving yards: 672
- Receiving touchdowns: 4
- Stats at Pro Football Reference

Raymond C. Crittenden IV (born March 1, 1970) is an American former professional football player who was a wide receiver in the National Football League (NFL). He played three sports in college at Virginia Tech.

== Early life ==
Raymond C. Crittenden IV was born on March 1, 1970, in Washington, D.C. He is a graduate of Annandale High School in Annandale, Virginia.

== College career ==
Crittenden attended Virginia Tech on a soccer scholarship, and set Tech single-season records for goals (15) and points (34). He played football in his final two years for the Hokies, when he caught nine passes for 113 yards and returned seven kickoffs for a 19.9-yard average. He was also on the basketball team. His accomplishments at Tech earned him a spot in the university's sports hall of fame.

== Professional career ==
Crittenden's speed caught the attention of pro scouts, even though he played sparingly as a college football player. He was consistently running sub-4.4 40-yard dashes. He was undrafted in the 1993 NFL draft, but was signed by the New England Patriots following spring mini-camp. Crittenden played in 46 games (44 with New England and 2 with the San Diego Chargers), catching 44 passes for 672 yards and 4 touchdowns.
