= Bernie Parmalee =

American football player and coach (born 1967)

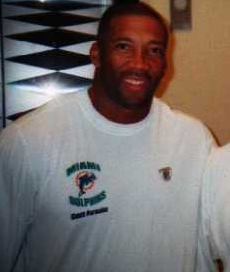
- Parmalee as a Miami Dolphins assistant coach in 2003

Carolina Panthers
- Title: Running backs coach

Personal information
- Born: September 16, 1967 (age 59); Jersey City, New Jersey, U.S.
- Listed height: 5 ft 11 in (1.80 m)
- Listed weight: 210 lb (95 kg)

Career information
- Position: Running back (No. 30, 34)
- High school: Lincoln (Jersey City, New Jersey)
- College: Ball State
- NFL draft: 1992: undrafted

Career history

Playing
- Miami Dolphins (1992–1998); New York Jets (1999–2000)

Coaching
- Miami Dolphins (2002) Assistant special teams coach; Miami Dolphins (2003) Assistant special teams coach & offensive assistant; Miami Dolphins (2004) Tight ends coach; Notre Dame (2005–2006) Tight ends coach & assistant special teams coach; Notre Dame (2007–2009) Tight ends coach; Kansas City Chiefs (2010–2012) Tight ends coach; Kansas (2014) Special teams quality control coach; Oakland Raiders (2015–2017) Running backs coach; Atlanta Falcons (2018) Running backs coach; Atlanta Falcons (2019) Assistant special teams coach & offensive assistant; Atlanta Falcons (2019–2020) Running backs coach; Atlanta Falcons (2020) Special teams coordinator; Jacksonville Jaguars (2021–2023) Running backs coach; Carolina Panthers (2024–present) Running backs coach

Awards and highlights
- MAC Freshman of the Year (1987)

Career NFL statistics
- Rushing yards: 2,179
- Rushing average: 3.8
- Receptions: 168
- Receiving yards: 1,485
- Total touchdowns: 20
- Stats at Pro Football Reference

Bernard A. Parmalee (born September 16, 1967) is an American football coach and former running back who is the running backs coach for the Carolina Panthers of the National Football League (NFL). He previously served as the running backs coach for the Jacksonville Jaguars from 2021 to 2023 and also served as an assistant coach for Oakland Raiders, Kansas City Chiefs and Miami Dolphins.

Parmalee played college football for the Ball State Cardinals, where he was inducted into the Hall of Fame in 2001, and was signed by the Miami Dolphins as an undrafted free agent in 1992. Playing for nine seasons in the NFL, Parmalee also played for the New York Jets.

== Playing career ==
Parmalee played high school football at Lincoln High School in Jersey City, New Jersey. Parmalee played in college at Ball State University, where he is the 3rd leading rusher all-time and was named MAC Freshman of the Year in 1987.

Pre-draft measurables
Height	Weight	Arm length	Hand span	40-yard dash	10-yard split	20-yard split	20-yard shuttle	Vertical jump	Broad jump	Bench press
5 ft 11 1/8 in (1.81 m)	191 lb (87 kg)	33 in (0.84 m)	9 1/4 in (0.23 m)	4.80 s	1.81 s	2.86 s	4.23 s	28.5 in (0.72 m)	9 ft 11 in (3.02 m)	11 reps
All values from NFL Combine

Parmalee played running back for the Miami Dolphins and the New York Jets from 1992 to 2000. Parmalee's professional opportunity came when he tried out for the Miami Dolphins after working for UPS. He played seven seasons with the Dolphins (1992–98) in 104 games, scoring fifteen rushing touchdowns and three receiving touchdowns while rushing for 1,959 yards and amassing 1,306 receiving yards. In 1999, he went to the Jets and played two seasons in 30 games with two rushing touchdowns, 220 rushing yards, and 179 receiving yards.

== Coaching career ==
=== Miami Dolphins ===
Parmalee coached both special teams and tight ends for the Miami Dolphins from 2002 to 2004.

=== Notre Dame Fighting Irish ===
Parmalee coached both special teams and tight ends for the Notre Dame Fighting Irish from 2005 to 2009. Irish tight ends did well under Parmalee's tutelage having produced multiple John Mackey Award finalists during his tenure (Anthony Fasano and John Carlson).

=== Kansas City Chiefs ===
The Chiefs announced him as their Tight Ends coach on February 1, 2010.

=== Oakland Raiders ===
He was hired by the Raiders as their new running backs coach on January 25, 2015. In Parmalee's first season in Oakland, Latavius Murray made the Pro Bowl, running for 1066 yards — the team's first 1000-yard rusher in five years. In Parmalee's second season in Oakland, the Raiders had the league's 6th ranked rushing attack. As Jon Gruden took over as head coach of the Raiders after the 2017 season, Parmalee was ousted with most of the Raiders coaching staff.

=== Atlanta Falcons ===
In 2018, Parmalee was hired to be the running backs coach for the Falcons. He coached Ito Smith in his first season where he tallied four rushing touchdowns, the most rushing touchdowns by a Falcons rookie since 2002. After working as an offensive assistant and assistant special teams coach to start the 2019 season, he returned to being the running backs coach on November 4.

On October 12, 2020, Parmalee was shifted from running backs coach to special teams coordinator, as part of a midseason shakeup of the coaching staff.

=== Jacksonville Jaguars ===
On February 10, 2021, Parmalee was hired by the Jacksonville Jaguars as their running backs coach under head coach Urban Meyer.

On February 17, 2022, he was retained under new head coach Doug Pederson.
