= J. B. Brown (cornerback) =

American football player (born 1967)

No. 37, 27, 26, 31
- Position: Cornerback

Personal information
- Born: January 5, 1967 (age 59); Washington D.C., U.S.
- Listed height: 6 ft 0 in (1.83 m)
- Listed weight: 193 lb (88 kg)

Career information
- High school: DeMatha Catholic (Hyattsville, Maryland)
- College: Maryland
- NFL draft: 1989: 12th round, 315th overall pick

Career history
- Miami Dolphins (1989–1996); Pittsburgh Steelers (1997); Arizona Cardinals (1998); Detroit Lions (1999–2000)

Career NFL statistics
- Tackles: 450
- Interceptions: 16
- Forced fumbles: 5
- Stats at Pro Football Reference

James Harold Brown (born January 5, 1967) is an American former professional football player who was a cornerback for 12 seasons in the National Football League (NFL) for the Miami Dolphins, Pittsburgh Steelers, Arizona Cardinals, and Detroit Lions. He played college football for the Maryland Terrapins.

== Early life ==
The only son of a Washington, D.C., police officer, Brown attended DeMatha Catholic High School and then went to University of Maryland, College Park and played defensive back. He was coached by Bobby Ross and Joe Krivak. Brown played in the 1985 Cherry Bowl. The University of Maryland was part of the Atlantic Coast Conference in 1985.

== Professional career ==
=== Miami Dolphins ===
Brown was selected by the Miami Dolphins in the 12th round (315th overall) of the 1989 NFL draft. His first year contract was about $65,000 in 1989. He was coached by Don Shula and played for Miami for eight years. Shula cut three other cornerbacks—rookie David Holmes, his fourth-round pick, and veterans Don McNeal and Bobby Watkins–but Brown made the team. In 1992, Brown played in the 1992 AFC Championship but Miami lost to the Buffalo Bills. In 1994, Brown started all 16 games and had 71 tackles and three interceptions. Brown was the starter for many years in Miami, but lost his job in 1996 to Calvin Jackson and to open the salary cap.

=== Pittsburgh Steelers ===
In 1997, the Pittsburgh Steelers picked up Brown, and he played one season for them. Coached by Bill Cowher to an 11-5-0 record, they finished first in AFC Central Division. The Steelers traded Brown August 28, 1998, to the Arizona Cardinals.

=== Arizona Cardinals ===
Brown played one year for the Arizona Cardinals, coached by Vince Tobin, finishing second in NFC East Division. The Cardinals won the NFC Wild Card game against (Cowboys) 20-7 despite being called the greatest fluke teams of all time because they went 9-7 despite getting outscored by their opponents 378–325.

=== Detroit Lions ===
Brown signed with the Detroit Lions July 19, 1999, when Bobby Ross was the head coach and the following year under Gary Moeller. He finished his playing career with the 30 tackles in 16 games for the Lions.

== Life after football ==
Brown is the director of sports performance and training for Grassroots Football League.

In 2013, the National Football League started The Legends Community. Brown is the Northeast Coordinator Legend Ambassador to lead the outreach.

== Personal life ==
Brown is married to Renee, and they have four children.
