= 1991 Nebraska Cornhuskers football team =

American college football season

1991 Nebraska Cornhuskers football

Big Eight co-champion

Orange Bowl, L 0–22 vs. Miami (FL)
- Conference: Big Eight Conference

Ranking
- Coaches: No. 16
- AP: No. 15
- Record: 9–2–1 (6–0–1 Big Eight)
- Head coach: Tom Osborne (19th season)
- Offensive scheme: I formation
- Defensive coordinator: Charlie McBride (11th season)
- Base defense: 3–4
- Home stadium: Memorial Stadium

1991 Big Eight Conference football standings
	Conf.					Overall
Team	W		L		T	W		L		T
No. 15 Nebraska +	6	–	0	–	1	9	–	2	–	1
No. 20 Colorado +	6	–	0	–	1	8	–	3	–	1
No. 16 Oklahoma	5	–	2	–	0	9	–	3	–	0
Kansas State	4	–	3	–	0	7	–	4	–	0
Kansas	3	–	4	–	0	6	–	5	–	0
Iowa State	1	–	5	–	1	3	–	7	–	1
Missouri	1	–	6	–	0	3	–	7	–	1
Oklahoma State	0	–	6	–	1	0	–	10	–	1
+ – Conference co-champions; Rankings from AP Poll

The 1991 Nebraska Cornhuskers football team represented the University of Nebraska–Lincoln in the 1991 NCAA Division I-A football season. The team was coached by Tom Osborne and played their home games in Memorial Stadium in Lincoln, Nebraska.

== Schedule ==
Date	Time	Opponent	Rank	Site	TV	Result	Attendance	Source
September 7	1:00 pm	Utah State*	No. 14	Memorial Stadium; Lincoln, NE		W 59–28	76,115	
September 14	1:00 pm	Colorado State*	No. 13	Memorial Stadium; Lincoln, NE	Prime	W 71–14	76,379	
September 21	7:00 pm	No. 4 Washington*	No. 9	Memorial Stadium; Lincoln, NE	ABC	L 21–36	76,304	
September 28	9:00 pm	at No. 24 Arizona State*	No. 16	Sun Devil Stadium; Tempe, AZ		W 18–9	72,812	
October 12	2:00 pm	at Oklahoma State	No. 14	Lewis Field; Stillwater, OK		W 49–15	30,150	
October 19	1:00 pm	Kansas State^{†}	No. 9	Memorial Stadium; Lincoln, NE (rivalry)		W 38–31	76,209	
October 26	1:00 pm	Missouri	No. 9	Memorial Stadium; Lincoln, NE (rivalry)		W 63–6	76,244	
November 2	6:30 pm	at No. 15 Colorado	No. 9	Folsom Field; Boulder, CO (rivalry)	ESPN	T 19–19	52,319	
November 9	1:00 pm	at Kansas	No. 11	Memorial Stadium; Lawrence, KS (rivalry)	Prime	W 59–23	40,000	
November 16	1:00 pm	Iowa State	No. 11	Memorial Stadium; Lincoln, NE (rivalry)		W 38–13	76,078	
November 29	12:30 pm	No. 19 Oklahoma	No. 11	Memorial Stadium; Lincoln, NE (rivalry)	ABC	W 19–14	76,386	
January 1, 1992	7:00 pm	vs. No. 1 Miami (FL)*	No. 11	Miami Orange Bowl; Miami, FL (Orange Bowl, rivalry)	NBC	L 0–22	77,747	
*Non-conference game; ^{†}Homecoming; Rankings from AP Poll released prior to the game; All times are in Central time; Source:

== Roster and coaching staff ==
1991 Nebraska Cornhuskers football team roster
Players
Coaches
Offense

Pos.	#	Name	Class
IB	4	George Achola	Sr
TE	95	Gerald Armstrong	So
C		Jason Baker
FB	35	Troy Barnes	So
IB		Rick Blatny	So
OT	76	Brian Boerboom	Sr
SE	18	Jon Bostick	Sr
IB	21	Derek Brown	So
G		Brady Caskey	So
G	65	Jeff Chaney	Sr
C	55	Terris Chorney	Jr
OT		John Clarke	Sr
QB		Joel Cornwell	Jr
FB		Faron Davison	So
G		Chris Demuth	So
SE	2	Corey Dixon	So
WB	11	Mark Dowse	Sr
SE	28	Darin Duin	Jr
FB		David Fiala	So
TE		Chris Fleischman	So
G		Bart Furrow	So
TE	80	Chris Garrett	Sr
OT		Joel Gesky	So
FB	37	Robert Glantz	Sr
QB		Todd Gragnano	Fr
QB	1	Mike Grant	Sr
QB	15	Tom Haase	Sr
FB	46	Rod Haarberg	Fr
WB	38	Vincent Hawkins	Jr
SE	33	Tyrone Hughes	Jr
C	63	Bill Humphrey	So
G	69	Dave Jensen	Jr
FB	41	Tim Johnk	Sr
IB	44	Calvin Jones	Fr
QB		Matt Jones	So
QB	2	Mickey Joseph	Sr
TE	85	Daryl Leise	Sr
FB	35	Lance Lewis	Sr
G		Jason Licht	So
OT	77	Lance Lundberg	So
C		Mike Mapes	So
QB	10	Keithen McCant	Sr
FB	7	Andre McDuffy	Sr
QB		John McMillen	Jr
G	62	Ken Mehlin	So
TE	86	Johnny Mitchell	So
FS	5	Randy Montgomery	Fr
WB	27	Abdul Muhammad	Fr
C		Brad Mundt	Jr
SE	82	Dan Pleasant	Sr
WB		Kelly Prater	Sr
FB	39	Travis Rader	So
OT	59	Ray Reifenrath	Sr
SE	81	Eric Schepers	So
FB		Cory Schlesinger	So
C	51	Jim Scott	Jr
WB	46	David Seizys	So
G	75	Will Shields	Jr
G	78	Trent (T.J.) Slansky	Jr
FB	25	Omar Soto	Sr
G	66	Brenden Stai	So
WB	33	Nate Turner	Sr
TE	88	Mike Vedral	Jr
OT	68	Doug Waddell	Jr
TE	83	Billy Wade	So
TE	89	William Washington	Jr
SE	87	Tom Werner	Jr
OT	61	Erik Wiegert	Sr
OT	72	Zach Wiegert	Fr
SE	98	Duane Wiles	Fr
G	65	Joel Wilks	So
OT	56	Rob Zatechka	Fr
C	53	Bill Ziegelbein	Sr
G	64	Chris Zyzda	Jr

Defense

Pos.	#	Name	Class
OLB	34	Trev Alberts	So
ILB		Leonard Alexander	So
ILB	48	Mike Anderson	So
ILB	39	Alvin Banks	Sr
MG		Ryan Barry	So
SS	23	Ernie Beler	So
ILB	54	Troy Branch	So
CB	5	Lorenzo Brinkley	So
DT	94	Brian Brown	Sr
FS	8	Tyrone Byrd	Jr
SS	31	Steve Carmer	Jr
SS	45	Zeke Cisco	So
CB	17	Sedric Collins	Fr
ILB	46	Doug Colman	Fr
DT		Terry Connealy	Fr
CB	9	Curtis Cotton	Sr
FS	4	Troy Dumas	Fr
MG	97	Pat Engelbert	Sr
OLB		Greg Fletcher	So
OLB		Tory Garland	So
ILB	43	Shane Geiken	Sr
SS		Travis Giesbrecht	So
CB		Chris Grass	Jr
OLB	91	Lance Gray	So
ILB		Brian Havens	So
CB	40	Mike Heins	So
FS	29	Jay Herman	So
OLB		Todd Heyne	So
OLB		Jerad Higman	So
OLB	93	Travis Hill	Jr
DT	74	Matt Hilman	Jr
MG		Jerry Irons	So
OLB	84	Donta Jones	Fr
ILB	41	LeRoi Jones	So
OLB	42	David Leader	Jr
CB	3	Tyrone Legette	Sr
DT	70	Jamie Liewer	Jr
OLB		David Mahalek	So
CB		Brady Mercer	So
DT	90	Bruce Moore	So
MG	73	David Noonan	So
DT	92	John Parrella	Jr
ILB	52	Matt Penland	Jr
DT		Jason Pesterfield	So
ILB	99	Mike Petko	Sr
SS	36	Brian Pollard	Jr
CB	16	Vernon Powell	So
ILB		Jim Prevette	So
DT	67	Kevin Ramaekers	So
FS	6	John Reece	So
ILB		Andy Reetz	So
CB		Greg Salvo	Jr
FS	24	Dean Schneider	So
CB		Jeff Solich	So
DT		Scott Spachman	So
ILB	32	Ed Stewart	Fr
SS		Austin Wertz	So
FS	12	Jamie Weyers	So
OLB	96	David White	Jr
ILB	49	Paul Wightman	Jr
CB	19	Kenny Wilhite	Jr
ILB	51	Daren Williams	So
ILB	35	Tyler Zahn	Jr

Special teams

Pos.	#	Name	Class
PK	13	Byron Bennett	So
PK	14	Jeff Lang	So
PK	35	Tom Sieler	Fr
PK		Pat Specht	So
P	47	Mike Stigge	Jr

Head coach

- Tom Osborne
  19th season
  28th year at Nebraska
  Alma mater: Nebraska

Coordinators/assistant coaches

- Charlie McBride
  11th season as DC/DL coach
  15th year at Nebraska
  Alma mater: Colorado
- Kevin Steele
  3rd season as LB coach
  3rd year at Nebraska
  Alma mater: Tennessee
- Ron Brown
  5th season as WR/TE coach
  5th year at Nebraska
  Alma mater: Brown
- Dan Young
  9th season as OL/K coach
  9th year at Nebraska
  Alma mater: Reed
- Milt Tenopir
  18th season as OL coach
  18th year at Nebraska
  Alma mater: Sterling
- Tony Samuel
  6th season as OLB coach
  6th year at Nebraska
  Alma mater: Nebraska
- George Darlington
  DB coach
  19th year at Nebraska
  Alma mater: Rutgers
- Frank Solich
  9th season as RB coach
  13th year at Nebraska
  Alma mater: Nebraska
- Boyd Epley
  23rd season as S&C coach
  23rd year at Nebraska
  Alma mater: Nebraska
- Jack Pierce
  13th year at Nebraska
- Bill Busch
  2nd year at Nebraska

Legend

- (C) Team captain
- (S) Suspended
- (I) Ineligible
- Injured
- Redshirt

Roster
Last update: 2011-01-17

=== 1991 Depth chart ===
Defense

FS
Tyrone Byrd
John Reece
Lorenzo Brinkley

OUTSIDE	INSDIE	INSDIE	OUTSIDE
Travis Hill	Mike Anderson	Mike Petko	David White
Lance Gray	Ed Stewart; Troy Branch	Darren Williams	Trev Alberts
David Leader	Paul Wightman	Shane Geiken	Donta Jones

SS
Steve Carmer
Ernie Beler
Troy Dumas

CB
Tyrone Legette
Vernon Powell
Mike Heins

DE	NT	DE
John Parrella	Pat Engelbert	Jamie Liewer
Bruce Moore	David Noonan	Kevin Ramaekers
Matt Hilman	Jerry Irons	Terry Connealy

CB
Curtis Cotton
Kenny Whilhite
Sedric Collins

Offense

SE
Jon Bostick
Tyrone Hughes
Dan Pleasant
Corey Dixon

LT	LG	C	RG	RT
Lance Lundberg	Erik Wiegert	Bill Ziegelbein	Will Shields	Brian Boerboom
Rob Zatechka	Chris Zyzda	Jim Scott	T.J Slansky	Zach Wiegert
Erik Wiegert	Dave Jensen	Terris Chorney	Ken Mehlin	Ray Reifenrath

TE
Johnny Mitchell
William Washington
Chris Garett

WB
Nate Turner
Abdul Muhammad
Vincent Hawkins

QB
Keithan McCant
Mickey Joseph
Tom Haase

RB
Derek Brown
Calvin Jones
George Achola
⋅

FB
Lance Lewis
Omar Soto
Tim Johnk

Special teams
PK Byron Bennett
P Mike Stigge

== Game summaries ==
=== Utah State ===
Utah State at Nebraska [box score]

Team	1	2	3	4	Total
Utah State	7	7	6	8	28
• Nebraska	17	7	16	19	59

- Date: September 7
- Location: Memorial Stadium, Lincoln, Nebraska
- Game attendance: 76,115

=== Colorado State ===
Colorado State at Nebraska [box score]

Team	1	2	3	4	Total
Colorado State	0	0	14	0	14
• Nebraska	17	26	14	14	71

- Date: September 14
- Location: Memorial Stadium, Lincoln, Nebraska
- Game attendance: 76,379

=== Washington ===
Washington at Nebraska [box score]

Team	1	2	3	4	Total
• Washington	0	6	10	20	36
Nebraska	7	7	7	0	21

- Date: September 21
- Location: Memorial Stadium, Lincoln, Nebraska
- Game attendance: 76,304

=== Arizona State ===
Nebraska at Arizona State [box score]

Team	1	2	3	4	Total
• Nebraska	8	0	3	7	18
Arizona State	0	3	6	0	9

- Date: September 28
- Location: Sun Devil Stadium, Tempe, Arizona
- Game attendance: 72,812

=== Oklahoma State ===
Nebraska at Oklahoma State [box score]

Team	1	2	3	4	Total
• Nebraska	14	7	7	21	49
Oklahoma State	0	3	5	7	15

- Date: October 12
- Location: Lewis Field, Stillwater, Oklahoma
- Game attendance: 30,150

=== Kansas State ===
Kansas State at Nebraska [box score]

Team	1	2	3	4	Total
Kansas State	7	10	14	0	31
• Nebraska	14	3	7	14	38

- Date: October 19
- Location: Memorial Stadium, Lincoln, Nebraska
- Game attendance: 76,209

=== Missouri ===
Missouri at Nebraska [box score]

Team	1	2	3	4	Total
Missouri	3	3	0	0	6
• Nebraska	21	21	14	7	63

- Date: October 26
- Location: Memorial Stadium, Lincoln, Nebraska
- Game attendance: 76,244

=== Colorado ===
Nebraska at Colorado [box score]

Team	1	2	3	4	Total
Nebraska	3	6	3	7	19
Colorado	7	5	7	0	19

- Date: November 2
- Location: Folsom Field, Boulder, Colorado
- Game attendance: 52,319

Scoring summary
Q1	11:20	NEB	Bennett 27 yard field goal	NEB 3–0
Q1	7:20	COLO	Hagan 11 yard run (Harper kick)	COLO 7–3
Q2	6:54	COLO	Harper 27 yard field goal	COLO 10–3
Q2	1:17	NEB	Bostick 49 yard pass from McCant (kick blocked)	COLO 10–9
Q2	1:17	COLO	Biekert 85 blocked PAT return	COLO 12–9
Q3	5:12	NEB	Bennett 35 yard field goal	Tie 12–12
Q3	0:27	COLO	Hagan 4 yard run (Harper kick)	COLO 19–12
Q4	6:41	NEB	D. Brown 7 yard run (Bennett kick)	Tie 19–19

=== Kansas ===
Nebraska at Kansas [box score]

Team	1	2	3	4	Total
• Nebraska	0	17	14	28	59
Kansas	17	3	3	0	23

- Date: November 9
- Location: Memorial Stadium, Lawrence, Kansas
- Game attendance: 40,000

=== Iowa State ===
Iowa State at Nebraska [box score]

Team	1	2	3	4	Total
Iowa State	0	6	0	7	13
• Nebraska	10	14	7	7	38

- Date: November 16
- Location: Memorial Stadium, Lincoln, Nebraska
- Game attendance: 76,078

=== Oklahoma ===
Oklahoma at Nebraska [box score]

Team	1	2	3	4	Total
Oklahoma	7	7	0	0	14
• Nebraska	0	3	7	9	19

- Date: November 29
- Location: Memorial Stadium, Lincoln, Nebraska
- Game attendance: 76,386
- Game weather: Rain

Scoring summary
Q1	11:39	OKLA	Gundy 1 yard run (Blanton kick)	OKLA 7–0
Q2	12:39	OKLA	Gaddis 1 yard run (Blanton kick)	OKLA 14–0
Q2	6:58	NEB	Bennett 22 yard field goal	OKLA 14–3
Q3	9:53	NEB	McCant 5 yard run (Bennett kick)	OKLA 14–10
Q4	12:20	NEB	Bennett 33 yard field goal	OKLA 14–13
Q4	2:57	NEB	C. Jones 15 yard run (pass failed)	NEB 19–14

=== Miami (FL) ===
Orange Bowl [box score]

Team	1	2	3	4	Total
• Miami	13	0	9	0	22
Nebraska	0	0	0	0	0

- Date: January 1
- Location: Miami Orange Bowl, Miami
- Game attendance: 77,747
- Television network: NBC

Scoring summary
Q1	11:04	MIA	K. Williams 8 yard pass from Torretta (Huerta kick)	MIA 7–0
Q1	5:04	MIA	Huerta 24 yard field goal	MIA 10–0
Q1	4:02	MIA	Huerta 24 yard field goal	MIA 13–0
Q3	11:19	MIA	L. Jones 1 yard run (pass failed)	MIA 19–0
Q3	2:33	MIA	Huerta 54 yard field goal	MIA 22–0

== Rankings ==
Ranking movements Legend: ██ Increase in ranking ██ Decrease in ranking
	Week															
Poll	Pre	1	2	3	4	5	6	7	8	9	10	11	12	13	14	Final
AP	15	14	13	9	16	15	14	9	9	9	11	11	11	11	11	15
Coaches	15	14	13	9	16	16	13	7	7	7	11	11	11	10	11	16

== Awards ==
Award	Name(s)
All-America 2nd team	Will Shields
All-America 3rd team	Derek Brown, Johnny Mitchell
Big Eight coach of the Year	Tom Osborne
Big Eight Offensive Player of the Year	Keithen McCant
Big Eight Offensive Newcomer of the Year	Calvin Jones
All-Big Eight 1st team	Brian Boerboom, Jon Bostick, Derek Brown, Tyrone Legette, Keithen McCant, Johnny Mitchell, Will Shields, Mike Stigge, Erik Wiegert
All-Big Eight 2nd team	Steve Carmer, Curtis Cotton, Pat Engelbert, Travis Hill, Calvin Jones, Mike Petko
All-Big Eight honorable mention	Mike Anderson, Byron Bennett, Tyrone Byrd, Lance Lewis, John Parrella, Jim Scott, William Washington, David White, Kenny Wilhite

== NFL and pro players ==
The following Nebraska players who participated in the 1991 season later moved on to the next level and joined a professional or semi-pro team as draftees or free agents.

Name	Team
Trev Alberts	Indianapolis Colts
Mike Anderson	Amsterdam Admirals
Derek Brown	New Orleans Saints
Terris Chorney	Edmonton Eskimos
Doug Colman	New York Giants
Corey Dixon	Atlanta Falcons
Troy Dumas	Kansas City Chiefs
Travis Hill	Cleveland Browns
Tyrone Hughes	New Orleans Saints
Calvin Jones	Los Angeles Raiders
Donta Jones	Pittsburgh Steelers
Tyrone Legette	New Orleans Saints
Keithen McCant	Winnipeg Blue Bombers
Johnny Mitchell	New York Jets
John Parrella	Buffalo Bills
John Reece	Kansas City Chiefs
Cory Schlesinger	Detroit Lions
Will Shields	Kansas City Chiefs
Brenden Stai	Pittsburgh Steelers
Ed Stewart	Carolina Panthers
Nate Turner	Buffalo Bills
David White	New England Patriots
Zach Wiegert	Los Angeles Rams
Rob Zatechka	New York Giants
