= 1991 Oklahoma Sooners football team =

American college football season

1991 Oklahoma Sooners football

Gator Bowl champion

Gator Bowl, W 48–14 vs. Virginia
- Conference: Big Eight Conference

Ranking
- Coaches: No. 14
- AP: No. 16
- Record: 9–3 (5–2 Big 8)
- Head coach: Gary Gibbs (3rd season)
- Offensive coordinator: Larry Coker (2nd season)
- Offensive scheme: Pro-style
- Defensive coordinator: Tom Hayes (1st season)
- Base defense: 5–2
- Captains: Jason Belser; Joe Bowden; Brandon Houston; Mike McKinley; Randy Wallace; Chris Wilson
- Home stadium: Oklahoma Memorial Stadium

1991 Big Eight Conference football standings
	Conf.					Overall
Team	W		L		T	W		L		T
No. 15 Nebraska +	6	–	0	–	1	9	–	2	–	1
No. 20 Colorado +	6	–	0	–	1	8	–	3	–	1
No. 16 Oklahoma	5	–	2	–	0	9	–	3	–	0
Kansas State	4	–	3	–	0	7	–	4	–	0
Kansas	3	–	4	–	0	6	–	5	–	0
Iowa State	1	–	5	–	1	3	–	7	–	1
Missouri	1	–	6	–	0	3	–	7	–	1
Oklahoma State	0	–	6	–	1	0	–	10	–	1
+ – Conference co-champions; Rankings from AP Poll

The 1991 Oklahoma Sooners football team represented the University of Oklahoma during the 1991 NCAA Division I-A football season. They played their home games at Oklahoma Memorial Stadium and competed as members of the Big Eight Conference. They were coached by third-year head coach Gary Gibbs.

== Schedule ==
Date	Time	Opponent	Rank	Site	TV	Result	Attendance	Source
September 14	1:00 p.m.	North Texas*	No. 9	Oklahoma Memorial Stadium; Norman, OK		W 40–2	69,211	
September 21	1:00 p.m.	Utah State*	No. 7	Oklahoma Memorial Stadium; Norman, OK		W 55–21	69,057	
September 28	1:30 p.m.	Virginia Tech*	No. 6	Oklahoma Memorial Stadium; Norman, OK		W 27–17	73,200	
October 5	1:00 p.m.	at Iowa State	No. 5	Cyclone Stadium; Ames, IA	PSN	W 29–8	42,950	
October 12	2:30 p.m.	vs. Texas*	No. 6	Cotton Bowl; Dallas, TX (Red River Shootout)	ABC	L 7–10	75,587	
October 19	2:30 p.m.	No. 22 Colorado	No. 12	Oklahoma Memorial Stadium; Norman, OK	ABC	L 17–34	72,926	
October 26	1:30 p.m.	Kansas	No. 21	Oklahoma Memorial Stadium; Norman, OK		W 41–3	68,128	
November 2	1:00 p.m.	Kansas State	No. 20	Oklahoma Memorial Stadium; Norman, OK		W 28–7	62,162	
November 9	1:00 p.m.	at Missouri	No. 20	Faurot Field; Columbia, MO (rivalry)	PPV	W 56–16	30,193	
November 16	1:00 p.m.	Oklahoma State	No. 18	Oklahoma Memorial Stadium; Norman, OK (Bedlam Series)	PSN	W 21–6	68,778	
November 29	2:30 p.m.	at No. 11 Nebraska	No. 19	Memorial Stadium; Lincoln, NE (rivalry)	ABC	L 14–19	76,386	
December 29	7:00 p.m.	vs. No. 19 Virginia*	No. 20	Gator Bowl Stadium; Jacksonville, FL (Gator Bowl)	TBS	W 48–14	62,003	
*Non-conference game; Rankings from AP Poll released prior to the game; All times are in Central time; Source:

== Rankings ==
Ranking movements Legend: ██ Increase in ranking ██ Decrease in ranking
	Week															
Poll	Pre	1	2	3	4	5	6	7	8	9	10	11	12	13	14	Final
AP	10	9	9	7	6	5	6	12	21	20	20	18	19	19	20	16
Coaches	11	9	9	8	7	6	5	12	20	19	18	16	16	16	20	14

== Roster ==
1991 Oklahoma Sooners football team roster
Players
Coaches
Offense

Pos.	#	Name	Class
QB	18	Joey Alfred	Jr
G	63	Mark Blodgett	Sr
G	60	John Bradley	Sr
TE	86	Rickey Brady	So
OT	66	Brian Brauninger	Sr
TB	23	Dewell Brewer	Jr
TB	22	Dustin Caldwell	Fr
RB	21	Inurell Chester	Fr
RB	30	Terry Collier	Fr
QB	10	Steve Collins	Jr
WR	9	Tink Collins	Jr
OL	65	Jason Comer	Fr
WR	5	Greg Ervin	Sr
OL	51	Joe Ervin	Jr
QB	18	Gerald Farley	Fr
RB	7	Rod Fisher	Sr
C	79	Eric Fultz	Sr
TB	32	Mike Gaddis	Sr
WR	14	Jeff Gibson	Fr
QB	12	Cale Gundy	So
QB	1	Albert Hall	Fr
FB	3	Scott Harper	Sr
OT	70	Brandon Houston (C)	Sr
G	67	Chris Jensen	Sr
FB	27	Corey Johnson	So
WR	81	David Jourdan	Fr
OT	58	Jason Keith	Jr
C	52	Brent Koontz	So
WR	3	Ted Long	Sr
RB	25	Billy McDade	Fr
FB	31	Mike McKinley (C)	Sr
WR	17	Chris Melson	Sr
TE	82	Joey Mickey	Jr
G	64	Paul Moriarty	Jr
WR	83	John Nelson	So
WR	85	JaJuan Penny	Fr
FB	33	Kenyon Rasheed	Jr
G	71	Jeff Resler	Fr
G	62	Broderick Roberson	Fr
TE	80	Pete Schmitt	Jr
FB	36	William Steines	Jr
QB	15	Doug Switzer	Fr
WR	11	Otis Taylor	Jr
TB	26	Travis Thompson	Jr
OT	68	Tim Vitito	Fr
C	50	Randy Wallace (C)	Sr
WR	2	Corey Warren	So
OT	74	Chris Watkins	Jr
G	55	Steve Wigington	Fr
C	60	Matt Wilson	Fr

Defense

Pos.	#	Name	Class
DT	95	Russell Allen	So
DB	39	John Anderson	So
DL	96	Joseph Asbel	Fr
NG	56	James Baldwin	Jr
DE	40	Reggie Barnes	Jr
DE	72	Aubrey Beavers	So
DB	29	Jason Belser (C)	Sr
LB	45	Joe Bowden (C)	Sr
DL	57	David Campbell	Fr
DB	14	Melvin Carter	Jr
NG	91	Ben Cavil	Fr
DB	24	Drew Christmon	So
LB	41	Mike Coats	So
DB	29	Perry Collier	Fr
DE	47	Brent DeQuasie	Fr
DB	48	Greg DeQuasie	Sr
DT	77	Stacey Dillard	Sr
LB	34	Mike Fields	Fr
DB	15	Charles Franks	Sr
LB	44	Mario Freeman	Fr
LB	49	Bryan Gorka	Fr
LB	43	Tremayne Green	Fr
DT	93	Matthew Harris	So
DE	13	Kyle Hill	Jr
LB	37	Jay Houtman	Jr
DE	89	Ronn Hull	So
DB	42	Darrius Johnson	Fr
DB	6	Russell Jones	Fr
LB	43	Mike Kaighan	Fr
DE	35	Daniel Kanu	Fr
DT	97	Proctor Land	Sr
DL	75	Chuck Langston	Fr
DB	22	Tony Levy	Sr
NG	46	Corey Mayfield	Sr
DB	17	Pete Norwood	So
DB	4	Tommy O'Hara	So
DL	94	Milton Overton	Fr
DL	78	Mark Parry	Fr
NG	87	Shad Patrick	So
DB	19	Terry Ray	Sr
NG	53	Mike Reed	Fr
DB	8	William Shankle	Jr
LB	44	Derrick Smith	Fr
DE	88	Trey Tippens	Jr
DB	28	Darnell Walker	Jr
DT	73	David Walsh	Sr
DB	31	Maylon Wesley	Fr
DL	90	Greg Wilkins	Fr
TB	20	Earnest Williams	So
LB	30	Chris Wilson (C)	Sr
DE	99	Corey Wilson	So
DL	92	Ricky Wren	So
DB	38	Allen Zeno	Fr

Special teams

Pos.	#	Name	Class
K	97	Barry Blanton	So
K	16	Scott Blanton	Fr
P/K	93	Blair Culley	Jr
K	98	Brian McGarry	Fr
K	39	Charlie Means	Fr
K/P	84	Brad Reddell	Jr

Head coach

- Gary Gibbs

Coordinators/assistant coaches

- Larry Coker – Offensive coordinator
- Mike Jones – Running backs and wide receivers
- Charley North – Tight ends and special teams
- Tom Hayes – Defensive coordinator
- John Blake – Defensive line
- Lucious Selmon – Outside linebacker and defensive end
- Johnny Barr – Linebackers
- Bobby Proctor – Defensive backs

Legend

- (C) Team captain
- (S) Suspended
- (I) Ineligible
- Injured
- Redshirt

Roster

== NFL draft ==
The following players were selected in the 1992 NFL draft following the season.

Round	Pick	Player	Position	NFL team
5	133	Joe Bowden	Linebacker	Houston Oilers
6	146	Brian Brauninger	Tackle	Phoenix Cardinals
6	152	Mike Gaddis	Running back	Minnesota Vikings
6	153	Stacey Dillard	Defensive tackle	New York Giants
6	158	Terry Ray	Defensive back	Atlanta Falcons
8	197	Jason Belser	Defensive back	Indianapolis Colts
10	269	Corey Mayfield	Defensive end	San Francisco 49ers
12	326	Brandon Houston	Tackle	Philadelphia Eagles
12	331	Chris Wilson	Linebacker	Chicago Bears
