= 1991 Colorado Buffaloes football team =

American college football season

1991 Colorado Buffaloes football

Big 8 co-champion

Blockbuster Bowl, L 25–30 vs. Alabama
- Conference: Big Eight Conference

Ranking
- Coaches: No. 20
- AP: No. 20
- Record: 8–3–1 (6–0–1 Big 8)
- Head coach: Bill McCartney (10th season)
- Offensive coordinator: Gary Barnett (1st season)
- Offensive scheme: I-bone
- Defensive coordinator: Mike Hankwitz (4th season)
- Base defense: 3–4
- MVP: Darian Hagan
- Captains: Jay Leeuwenburg; Greg Thomas
- Home stadium: Folsom Field

1991 Big Eight Conference football standings
	Conf.					Overall
Team	W		L		T	W		L		T
No. 15 Nebraska +	6	–	0	–	1	9	–	2	–	1
No. 20 Colorado +	6	–	0	–	1	8	–	3	–	1
No. 16 Oklahoma	5	–	2	–	0	9	–	3	–	0
Kansas State	4	–	3	–	0	7	–	4	–	0
Kansas	3	–	4	–	0	6	–	5	–	0
Iowa State	1	–	5	–	1	3	–	7	–	1
Missouri	1	–	6	–	0	3	–	7	–	1
Oklahoma State	0	–	6	–	1	0	–	10	–	1
+ – Conference co-champions; Rankings from AP Poll

The 1991 Colorado Buffaloes football team represented the University of Colorado at Boulder as a member of the Big Eight Conference during the 1991 NCAA Division I FBS football season. Led by tenth-year year head coach Bill McCartney, the Buffaloes compiled an overall record of 8–3–1 in a mark of 6–0–1 in conference play, sharing the Big 8 title with Nebraska. Colorado was invited to the Blockbuster Bowl, where the Buffaloes lost to Alabama. The team was ranked No. 20 in the final AP poll and the final Coaches Poll. Colorado played home games at Folsom Field in Boulder, Colorado.

== Schedule ==
Date	Time	Opponent	Rank	Site	TV	Result	Attendance	Source
September 7	5:30 pm	Wyoming*	No. 12	Folsom Field; Boulder, CO	ESPN	W 30–13	52,155	
September 14	12:00 pm	No. 23 Baylor*	No. 12	Folsom Field; Boulder, CO	KCNC	L 14–16	50,754	
September 21	12:00 pm	Minnesota*	No. 19	Folsom Field; Boulder, CO	KCNC	W 58–0	42,147	
September 28	1:30 pm	at Stanford*	No. 17	Stanford Stadium; Stanford, CA	ABC	L 21–28	57,394	
October 12	12:00 pm	Missouri^{†}	No. 25	Folsom Field; Boulder, CO	KCNC	W 55–7	52,315	
October 19	1:30 pm	at No. 12 Oklahoma	No. 22	Oklahoma Memorial Stadium; Norman, OK	ABC	W 34–17	72,926	
October 26	12:10 pm	at Kansas State	No. 16	KSU Stadium; Manhattan, KS (rivalry)	KCNC	W 10–0	31,987	
November 2	5:30 pm	No. 9 Nebraska	No. 15	Folsom Field; Boulder, CO (rivalry)	ESPN	T 19–19	52,319	
November 9	12:30 pm	at Oklahoma State	No. 14	Lewis Field; Stillwater, OK	KCNC	W 16–12	25,000	
November 16	12:00 pm	Kansas	No. 16	Folsom Field; Boulder, CO	KCNC	W 30–24	40,863	
November 23	12:00 pm	at Iowa State	No. 15	Cyclone Stadium; Ames, IA	KCNC	W 17–14	36,256	
December 28	7:00 pm	vs. No. 8 Alabama*	No. 15	Joe Robbie Stadium; Miami Gardens, FL (Blockbuster Bowl)	CBS	L 25–30	52,644	
*Non-conference game; ^{†}Homecoming; Rankings from AP Poll released prior to the game; Source:

== Game summaries ==
=== Wyoming ===
	1	2	3	4	Total
#8 Buffaloes	9	7	7	7	30
Cowboys	10	3	0	0	13

=== Baylor ===
	1	2	3	4	Total
#7 Buffaloes	14	0	0	0	14
#24 Bears	7	3	3	3	16

=== Minnesota ===
	1	2	3	4	Total
#15 Buffaloes	28	10	10	10	58
Golden Gophers	0	0	0	0	0

=== At Stanford ===
	1	2	3	4	Total
Cardinal	28	0	0	0	28
#11 Buffaloes	0	0	0	21	21

=== Missouri ===
	1	2	3	4	Total
#25 Buffaloes	20	14	14	7	55
Tigers	7	0	0	0	7

=== At Oklahoma ===
	1	2	3	4	Total
#2 Sooners	3	14	0	0	17
#20 Buffaloes	20	7	0	7	34

=== At Kansas State ===
	1	2	3	4	Total
#23 Wildcats	0	0	0	0	0
#19 Buffaloes	3	0	7	0	10

=== Nebraska ===
Nebraska at Colorado

Team	1	2	3	4	Total
Cornhuskers	3	6	3	7	19
Buffaloes	7	5	7	0	19

- Date: November 2
- Location: Folsom Field, Boulder, Colorado
- Game attendance: 52,319

Scoring summary
Q1	11:20	NEB	Bennett 27 yard field goal	NEB 3–0
Q1	7:20	COLO	Hagan 11 yard run (Harper kick)	COLO 7–3
Q2	6:54	COLO	Harper 27 yard field goal	COLO 10–3
Q2	1:17	NEB	Bostick 49 yard pass from McCant (kick blocked)	COLO 10–9
Q2	1:17	COLO	Biekert 85 blocked PAT return	COLO 12–9
Q3	5:12	NEB	Bennett 35 yard field goal	Tie 12–12
Q3	0:27	COLO	Hagan 4 yard run (Harper kick)	COLO 19–12
Q4	6:41	NEB	D. Brown 7 yard run (Bennett kick)	Tie 19–19

=== At Oklahoma State ===
	1	2	3	4	Total
Cowboys	3	3	3	3	12
#22 Buffaloes	13	0	0	3	16

=== Kansas ===
	1	2	3	4	Total
#20 Buffaloes	0	20	10	0	30
Jayhawks	3	14	7	0	24

=== At Iowa State ===
#15 Colorado Buffaloes (7–2–1) at Iowa State Cyclones (3–6–1)

Quarter	1	2	3	4	Total
Colorado	0	10	7	0	17
Iowa St	7	7	0	0	14

at Jack Trice Stadium, Ames, Iowa

- Date: November 23, 1991
- Game weather: Snow, 17 °F (−8 °C)
- Game attendance: 36,256
- TV announcers: Les Shapiro and Dave Logan

Colorado clinched share of Big Eight conference title for third straight season.

External videos
- Full game

Team	Category	Player	Statistics
Colorado	Passing		
Colorado	Rushing	Lamont Warren	168 Yds
Colorado	Receiving		
Iowa St	Passing		
Iowa St	Rushing		
Iowa St	Receiving		

Scoring summary

Quarter	Time	Drive			Team	Scoring information	Score	
Quarter	Time	Plays	Yards	TOP	Team	Scoring information	CU	ISU
2					Colorado	Lamont Warren 74-yard touchdown run, kick good	10	7
2					Iowa St	Jim Knott 17-yard touchdown run, kick good	10	14
3		10	80		Colorado	Sean Brown 8-yard touchdown reception from Darian Hagan, kick good	17	14
"TOP" = time of possession. For other American football terms, see Glossary of American football.							17	14

=== Blockbuster Bowl (vs Alabama) ===
	1	2	3	4	Total
#8 Crimson Tide	7	3	13	7	30
#15 Buffaloes	7	5	7	6	25

== Personnel ==
1991 Colorado Buffaloes football team roster
Players
Coaches
Offense

Pos.	#	Name	Class
OL		Craig Anderson
RB		David Arterberry
RB		Matt Bell
RB		Darnell Brooks
TE		Sean Brown	Sr
RB		Kendall Bussey
RB		Dennis Collier
TE		Sean Embree
TE	88	Christian Fauria	Fr
QB		Darian Hagan
OL		Jim Hansen
WR		Mark Henry
RB		James Hill
OL		Roger Ivey
OL		Robbie James
WR		Charles E. Johnson
QB		Vance Joseph
RB		Kent Kahl
OL		Jay Leeuwenburg
WR		Erik Mitchell
OL		Clint Moore
OL		Jason Perkins
RB		Scott Phillips
RB		Tony Senna
WR		Rico Smith
RB		Chuck Snowden
QB		Kordell Stewart
RB		Lamont Warren	Fr
WR		Michael Westbrook

Defense

Pos.	#	Name	Class
LB	19	Greg Biekert	Jr
CB	13	Ronnie Bradford	Jr
LB	34	Chad Brown	Jr
DL		Brian Dyet
DL		Marcellous Elder
DB		Deon Figures
DB		Eric Hamilton
LB		Ted Johnson
LB		Jon Knutson
DL		Leonard Renfro
DL		Joel Steed
DB		Greg Thomas
LB		Ron Woolfork

Special teams

Pos.	#	Name	Class
P, K		Mitch Berger
K		Pat Blottiaux
K		Jim Harper

Head coach

- Bill McCartney

Coordinators/assistant coaches

Legend

- (C) Team captain
- (S) Suspended
- (I) Ineligible
- Injured
- Redshirt

== After the season ==
=== NFL draft ===
The following Buffaloes were selected in the 1992 NFL draft after the season.

Round	Pick	Player	Position	NFL team
3	67	Joel Steed	Defensive tackle	Pittsburgh Steelers
6	143	Rico Smith	Wide receiver	Cleveland Browns
9	242	Darian Hagan	Wide receiver	San Francisco 49ers
9	244	Jay Leeuwenburg	Center	Kansas City Chiefs
