= Margaret Bullock =

Margaret Bullock may refer to

- Margaret Bullock (journalist) (1845–1903), New Zealand journalist, writer, feminist and social reformer
- Margaret Bullock (physiotherapist) (born 1933), Australian professor of physiotherapy and pioneer in the field of ergonomics
