= Grand Prairie Independent School District =

School district in Texas

Coordinates: 32°42′24″N 96°59′33″W

Location
- Grand Prairie, Texas USA

District information
- Type: Public
- Grades: Pre-K through 12
- Superintendent: Dr. Gabriel A. Trujillo. (2025-Present)
- Budget: 2007-2008 Budget Summary

Students and staff
- Students: 26,600 (2023)
- Teachers: 1,579 (2007)
- Staff: 1,318 (2007)
- Athletic conference: UIL 8-6A

Other information
- Website: Grand Prairie ISD

Grand Prairie Independent School District is a school district headquartered in Grand Prairie, Texas, United States.

GPISD is a 58-square-mile (150 km^{2}) district serving more than 26,600 students within the Dallas County portion of Grand Prairie. The district boasts 41 campuses, including two early education schools, 22 elementary schools, six middle schools, three 6-12 campuses, three high schools, two early college high schools, and two alternative education schools. The District employs more than 4,529 staff members and offers a variety of services and programs designed to help students radiate success.

To attend a GPISD school, kindergarten children must be five years old on or before September 1 of the current school year. Special early childhood programs are available for children ages 3–5 who are handicapped or developmentally delayed, and for infants from birth to age two who are blind or deaf.

GPISD is an open enrollment district through the Schools and Programs of Choice. Students entering GPISD from other accredited schools are admitted at the level authorized by individual transcripts. A student enrolling in Grand Prairie schools must be a resident of the GPISD and must provide satisfactory proof of residency and required immunizations.

The high schools in the district are Grand Prairie High School, South Grand Prairie High School, Grand Prairie Fine Arts Academy and Dubiski Career High School.

The GPISD Education Center is located at 2602 South Belt Line Road.

In 2011, the school district was rated "academically acceptable" by the Texas Education Agency.

The school district received national attention when the district cancelled a production of the musical Little Shop of Horrors at South Grand Prairie High School because a female South Grand Prairie student was cast in the lead role of Seymour, a male character. The school district was concerned that the casting would violate Texas Senate Bill 12 and other anti-DEI laws.

== Schools ==
=== High schools ===
- Grades 9-12
  - Grand Prairie High School
  - South Grand Prairie High School
  - Dubiski Career High School
- Grades 6-12
  - Grand Prairie Fine Arts Academy
  - Grand Prairie Collegiate Institute

=== Middle schools ===
- Grades 6-8
  - Digital Arts & Technology Academy at Adams Middle School
  - Fannin Middle School
  - Jackson Middle School
  - Reagan Middle School
  - Truman Middle School
  - Bill Arnold Middle School

=== Elementary schools ===
- Grades K-5
  - Austin Environmental Science Academy
  - Bowie Fine Arts Academy
  - Global Leadership Academy at Barbara Bush Elementary
  - Daniels Elementary Academy of Science and Math
  - De Zavala Environmental Science Academy
  - Dickinson Montessori Academy
  - Eisenhower Elementary School
  - Florence Hill Elementary School
  - Garcia Elementary School
  - Garner Fine Arts Academy
  - Marshall Leadership Academy
  - Ochoa STEM Academy at Milam Elementary
  - Moore College & Career Preparatory
  - Morton Elementary School
  - Moseley Elementary School
  - Powell Elementary
  - Rayburn Elementary STEAM Academy
  - School for the Highly Gifted
  - Seguin Elementary School
  - Travis World Language Academy
  - Whitt Fine Arts Academy
  - Williams Elementary

=== Early Education Centers ===
- Pre-K & Kindergarten
  - Bonham Early Education School
  - Crockett Early Education School

=== Alternative Schools ===
- Johnson Alternative Education Program (Grades 6–12)
- Crosswinds High School (Grades 9–12)

== Demographics ==
In 1997, 42.5% of the students were non-Hispanic white. Eric Nicholson of the Dallas Observer stated that white flight was already occurring by then. In 2000 46% of the students were Hispanic or Latino, and this increased to 57% by 2005. By 2016, 12% of the students were non-Hispanic white, and Nicholson concluded that "change happened rapidly.".

In 1997, 45.1% of the students were low income - Nicholson stated that an increase in poor students was already occurring by then-but this increased to 72% in 2016.
