= 1991 Kansas State Wildcats football team =

American college football season

1991 Kansas State Wildcats football
- Conference: Big Eight Conference
- Record: 7–4 (4–3 Big 8)
- Head coach: Bill Snyder (3rd season)
- Offensive coordinator: Del Miller (3rd season)
- Offensive scheme: Multiple
- Co-defensive coordinators: Jim Leavitt (1st season); Bob Stoops (1st season)
- Base defense: 4–3
- Home stadium: KSU Stadium

1991 Big Eight Conference football standings
	Conf.					Overall
Team	W		L		T	W		L		T
No. 15 Nebraska +	6	–	0	–	1	9	–	2	–	1
No. 20 Colorado +	6	–	0	–	1	8	–	3	–	1
No. 16 Oklahoma	5	–	2	–	0	9	–	3	–	0
Kansas State	4	–	3	–	0	7	–	4	–	0
Kansas	3	–	4	–	0	6	–	5	–	0
Iowa State	1	–	5	–	1	3	–	7	–	1
Missouri	1	–	6	–	0	3	–	7	–	1
Oklahoma State	0	–	6	–	1	0	–	10	–	1
+ – Conference co-champions; Rankings from AP Poll

The 1991 Kansas State Wildcats football team represented Kansas State University in the 1991 NCAA Division I-A football season. The team's head football coach was Bill Snyder. The Wildcats played their home games in KSU Stadium. 1991 saw the Wildcats finish with a record of 7–4, and a 4–3 record in Big Eight Conference play.

1991 saw the first winning season for Kansas State since 1982. The Wildcats shut out Missouri on November 16, 1991, which marked their first shutout of an opponent since September 20, 1975, when they shut out Wichita State at home.

== Schedule ==
Date	Time	Opponent	Site	Result	Attendance	Source
September 7	6:30 p.m.	Indiana State*	KSU Stadium; Manhattan, KS	W 26–25	26,183	
September 14	6:30 p.m.	Idaho State*	KSU Stadium; Manhattan, KS	W 41–7	27,126	
September 21	6:30 p.m.	Northern Illinois*	KSU Stadium; Manhattan, KS	W 34–17	27,229	
September 28	2:30 p.m.	at No. 4 Washington*	Husky Stadium; Seattle, WA	L 3–56	71,638	
October 12	1:10 p.m.	Kansas^{†}	KSU Stadium; Manhattan, KS (rivalry)	W 16–12	40,856	
October 19	1:00 p.m.	at No. 9 Nebraska	Memorial Stadium; Lincoln, NE (rivalry)	L 31–38	76,209	
October 26	1:10 p.m.	No. 16 Colorado	KSU Stadium; Manhattan, KS (rivalry)	L 0–10	31,987	
November 2	1:00 p.m.	at No. 20 Oklahoma	Oklahoma Memorial Stadium; Norman, OK	L 7–28	62,162	
November 9	1:00 p.m.	at Iowa State	Cyclone Stadium; Ames, IA (rivalry)	W 37–7	37,052	
November 16	1:00 p.m.	Missouri	KSU Stadium; Manhattan, KS	W 32–0	20,986	
November 23	1:30 p.m.	at Oklahoma State	Lewis Field; Stillwater, OK	W 36–26	17,800	
*Non-conference game; ^{†}Homecoming; Rankings from AP Poll released prior to the game; All times are in Central time; Source:

== Game summaries ==
=== At Washington ===
Kansas State at #4 Washington

Team	1	2	3	4	Total
Wildcats	0	3	0	0	3
• Huskies	21	14	7	14	56

- Date: September 28
- Location: Husky Stadium, Seattle, WA
- Game start: 12:30 pm PDT
- Game attendance: 71,638
- Game weather: 65F Cloudy
- TV announcers (Prime Sports Northwest): Don Poier and Chuck Nelson

Scoring summary
Q1	13:08	UW	Jay Barry 3 yard run (Travis Hanson kick)	UW 7–0
Q1	10:30	UW	Mario Bailey 71 yard pass from Billy Joe Hobert (kick failed)	UW 13–0
Q1	3:21	UW	Beno Bryant 4 yard run (Travis Hanson kick)	UW 20–0
Q2	12:22	UW	Jay Barry 1 yard run (Travis Hanson kick)	UW 27–0
Q2	3:00	UW	Orlando McKay 28 yard pass from Billy Joe Hobert (Leif Johnson pass from Eric Bjornson)	UW 35–0
Q2	0:00	KSU	Tate Wright 42 yard field goal	UW 35–3
Q3	4:19	UW	Mario Bailey 32 yard pass from Billy Joe Hobert (Travis Hanson kick)	UW 42–3
Q4	11:05	UW	Beno Bryant 53 yard punt return (Jason Crabbe kick)	UW 49–3
Q4	6:39	UW	Napoleon Kaufman 3 yard run (Jason Crabbe kick)	UW 56–3

=== At Nebraska ===
Kansas State at #9 Nebraska

Team	1	2	3	4	Total
Wildcats	7	10	14	0	31
• Cornhuskers	14	3	7	14	38

- Date: October 19
- Location: Memorial Stadium, Lincoln, NE
- Game attendance: 76,209

=== Colorado ===
	1	2	3	4	Total
#23 Wildcats	0	0	0	0	0
#19 Buffaloes	3	0	7	0	10

== Roster ==
1991 Kansas State Wildcats football team roster
Players
Coaches
Offense

Pos.	#	Name	Class
TE	86	Russ Campbell	Sr
WR	28	Andre Coleman	Jr
RB	1	Eric Gallon	Jr
C	72	Quentin Neujahr	So
OT	77	Mike Orr	Jr
WR	88	Michael Smith	Sr
OL		Doug Grush	Sr
QB	14	Paul Watson	Sr

Defense

Pos.	#	Name	Class
DE	89	Elijah Alexander	Sr
LB		Mike Ekeler	Fr
LB	45	Kirby Hocutt	Fr
CB	5	William Price	Sr
MLB	52	Joe Boone	Sr
DL	76	Evan Simpson	Sr
CB	31	Thomas Randolph	So
LB		Brent Venables	Jr

Special teams

Pos.	#	Name	Class
K		Tate Wright	Jr

Head coach

- Bill Snyder

Coordinators/assistant coaches

- Del Miller – Offensive Coordinator
- John Latina – Offensive line & running game coordinator
- Dana Dimel – Offensive line
- Bob Stoops – Defensive Coordinator
- John Hendrick – Defensive line
- Jim Leavitt – Linebackers
- Ben Griffith – Assistant
- Tom Grogan – Assistant
- Nick Quartaro – Assistant

Legend

- (C) Team captain
- (S) Suspended
- (I) Ineligible
- Injured
- Redshirt

== After the season ==
=== NFL draft ===
The following Wildcats were selected in the 1992 NFL draft after the season.

Round	Pick	Player	Position	NFL team
5	118	Rogerick Green	Cornerback	Tampa Bay Buccaneers
7	179	Russ Campbell	Tight end	Pittsburgh Steelers
10	254	Elijah Alexander	Linebacker	Tampa Bay Buccaneers
