= 1991 Iowa State Cyclones football team =

American college football season

1991 Iowa State Cyclones football
- Conference: Big Eight Conference
- Record: 3–7–1 (1–5–1 Big 8)
- Head coach: Jim Walden (5th season)
- Defensive coordinator: Robin Ross (5th season)
- Home stadium: Cyclone Stadium

1991 Big Eight Conference football standings
	Conf.					Overall
Team	W		L		T	W		L		T
No. 15 Nebraska +	6	–	0	–	1	9	–	2	–	1
No. 20 Colorado +	6	–	0	–	1	8	–	3	–	1
No. 16 Oklahoma	5	–	2	–	0	9	–	3	–	0
Kansas State	4	–	3	–	0	7	–	4	–	0
Kansas	3	–	4	–	0	6	–	5	–	0
Iowa State	1	–	5	–	1	3	–	7	–	1
Missouri	1	–	6	–	0	3	–	7	–	1
Oklahoma State	0	–	6	–	1	0	–	10	–	1
+ – Conference co-champions; Rankings from AP Poll

The 1991 Iowa State Cyclones football team represented Iowa State University as a member of the Big Eight Conference during the 1991 NCAA Division I-A football season. Led by fifth-year head coach Jim Walden, the Cyclones compiled an overall record of 3–7–1 with a mark of 1–5–1 in conference play, placing sixth in the Big 8. Iowa State played home games at Cyclone Stadium in Ames, Iowa.

== Schedule ==
Date	Time	Opponent	Site	TV	Result	Attendance	Source
September 7	1:00 p.m.	Eastern Illinois*	Cyclone Stadium; Ames, IA		W 42–13	41,680	
September 14	11:30 a.m.	No. 14 Iowa*	Cyclone Stadium; Ames, IA (rivalry)	ABC	L 10–29	54,469	
September 21	1:05 p.m.	at Wisconsin*	Camp Randall Stadium; Madison, WI		L 6–7	50,710	
September 28	3:45 p.m.	at Rice*	Rice Stadium; Houston, TX		W 28–27	33,900	
October 5	1:00 p.m.	No. 5 Oklahoma	Cyclone Stadium; Ames, IA	PSN	L 8–29	42,950	
October 19	1:00 p.m.	at Kansas	Memorial Stadium; Lawrence, KS		L 0–41	37,000	
October 26	1:00 p.m.	Oklahoma State^{†}	Cyclone Stadium; Ames, IA		T 6–6	41,528	
November 2	1:00 p.m.	at Missouri	Faurot Field; Columbia, MO (rivalry)		W 23–22	27,872	
November 9	1:00 p.m.	Kansas State	Cyclone Stadium; Ames, IA (rivalry)		L 7–37	37,052	
November 16	1:00 p.m.	at No. 11 Nebraska	Memorial Stadium; Lincoln, NE (rivalry)		L 13–38	76,078	
November 23	1:00 p.m.	No. 15 Colorado	Cyclone Stadium; Ames, IA	KCNC	L 14–17	36,256	
*Non-conference game; ^{†}Homecoming; Rankings from AP Poll released prior to the game; All times are in Central time; Source:

== Game summaries ==
=== Iowa ===
#14 Iowa at Iowa State

Team	1	2	3	4	Total
• Hawkeyes	17	3	2	7	29
Cyclones	0	3	0	7	10

- Date: September 14
- Location: Jack Trice Stadium
  Ames, IA
- Game start: 11:30 a.m. CDT
- Game attendance: 54,469
- Television network: ABC

Scoring summary
1	IOWA	Hughes 46-yard pass from Rodgers (Skillett kick)	IOWA 7–0
1	IOWA	Kujawa 2-yard run (Skillett kick)	IOWA 14-0
1	IOWA	Skillett field goal	IOWA 17-0
2	ISU	Stewart 35-yard field goal	IOWA 17-3
2	IOWA	Skillett 20-yard field goal	IOWA 20-3
3	IOWA	Safety Hilliard blocked punt out of the end zone	IOWA 22-3
4	ISU	Spencer 7-yard pass from Pedersen (Stewart kick)	IOWA 22-10
4	IOWA	Whitaker 28-yard pass from Rodgers (Skillett kick)	IOWA 29-10

=== At Nebraska ===
Iowa State at Nebraska

Team	1	2	3	4	Total
Cyclones	0	6	0	7	13
• Cornhuskers	10	14	7	7	38

- Date: November 16
- Location: Memorial Stadium, Lincoln, Nebraska
- Game attendance: 76,078

=== Colorado ===
#15 Colorado Buffaloes (7–2–1) at Iowa State Cyclones (3–6–1)

Quarter	1	2	3	4	Total
Colorado	0	10	7	0	17
Iowa St	7	7	0	0	14

at Jack Trice Stadium, Ames, Iowa

- Date: November 23, 1991
- Game weather: Snow, 17 °F (−8 °C)
- Game attendance: 36,256
- TV announcers: Les Shapiro and Dave Logan

External videos
- Full game

Team	Category	Player	Statistics
Colorado	Passing		
Colorado	Rushing	Lamont Warren	168 Yds
Colorado	Receiving		
Iowa St	Passing		
Iowa St	Rushing		
Iowa St	Receiving		

Scoring summary

Quarter	Time	Drive			Team	Scoring information	Score	
Quarter	Time	Plays	Yards	TOP	Team	Scoring information	CU	ISU
2					Colorado	Lamont Warren 74-yard touchdown run, kick good	10	7
2					Iowa St	Jim Knott 17-yard touchdown run, kick good	10	14
3		10	80		Colorado	Sean Brown 8-yard touchdown reception from Darian Hagan, kick good	17	14
"TOP" = time of possession. For other American football terms, see Glossary of American football.							17	14

== Roster ==
1991 Iowa State Cyclones football team roster
Players
Coaches
Offense

Pos.	#	Name	Class
TE	82	Scott English	So
RB	26	Jim Knott	Fr
QB	5	Chris Pederson	Sr
OL	63	Dave Ward	Jr
WR	1	Jay Williams	Fr
QB	12	Ty Yohe	So

Defense

Pos.	#	Name	Class
DT	65	Travis Block	Sr
DB	25	Mark DouBrava	Jr
DE	99	Mark Dunn	Sr
DB	33	Kevin Lazard	So
DE	95	Mark Rehberg	Sr

Special teams

Pos.	#	Name	Class
P	19	Jon Schnoor	Jr

Head coach

- Jim Walden

Coordinators/assistant coaches

Legend

- (C) Team captain
- (S) Suspended
- (I) Ineligible
- Injured
- Redshirt
