= James E. Stewart =

James E. Stewart may refer to:

- James E. Stewart (politician) (1814–1890), American politician and judge in Virginia
- James E. Stewart (civil rights leader)
