= 1991 Gator Bowl =

The 1991 Gator Bowl may refer to:

- 1991 Gator Bowl (January) - January 1, 1991, game between the Michigan Wolverines and the Ole Miss Rebels
- 1991 Gator Bowl (December) - December 29, 1991, game between the Oklahoma Sooners and the Virginia Cavaliers
