= Joe Bowden =

American football player and coach (born 1970)

Bowling Green Falcons
- Title: Defensive coordinator

Personal information
- Born: February 25, 1970 (age 56); Dallas, Texas, U.S.
- Listed height: 5 ft 11 in (1.80 m)
- Listed weight: 230 lb (104 kg)

Career information
- High school: North Mesquite (Mesquite, Texas)
- College: Oklahoma
- NFL draft: 1992: 5th round, 133rd overall pick

Career history

Playing
- Houston Oilers / Tennessee Oilers / Titans (1992–1999); Dallas Cowboys (2000)

Coaching
- NFL Europe (2002–2004) Assistant linebackers coach; Central Oklahoma (2006–2008) Secondary coach; Mount St. Mary HS (OK) (2011) Co-defensive coordinator & defensive backs coach; Edmond Santa Fe HS (OK) (2012) Defensive backs coach; St. Louis Rams (2012–2015) Assistant linebackers coach; San Francisco 49ers (2016) Inside linebackers coach; Missouri Baptist (2017–2020) Defensive coordinator & linebackers coach; Tennessee State (2021–2024) Assistant head coach & linebackers coach; Bowling Green (2025) Linebackers coach; Bowling Green (2026–present) Defensive coordinator

Awards and highlights
- First-team All-American (1991); Big Eight Defensive Player of the Year (1991); Big Eight Defensive Newcomer of the Year (1989); First-team All-Big Eight (1991); Second-team All-Big Eight (1990)

Career NFL statistics
- Tackles: 436
- Sacks: 12.5
- Forced fumbles: 9
- Interceptions: 3
- Stats at Pro Football Reference

Joe Tarrod Bowden, III (born February 25, 1970) is an American former professional football player who was a linebacker in the National Football League (NFL) for the Houston Oilers / Tennessee Oilers / Tennessee Titans and Dallas Cowboys. He played college football for the Oklahoma Sooners.

== Early life ==
Bowden attended North Mesquite High School in Mesquite, Texas, where he received All-American and All-state recognition. He accepted a football scholarship from the University of Oklahoma. Bowden did not play in his first year, as he failed to meet the requirements of Proposition 48.

As a junior in 1990, Bowden led the team in tackles with 116 (three for loss), while making one interception, four passes defensed, one forced fumble and one fumble recovery. He gained All-American honors as a senior, while registering 127 tackles, two sacks and two interceptions (both returned for touchdowns). Bowden finished his college career with 286 tackles (168 solo), two sacks, three interceptions, six passes defensed, three fumble recoveries and two forced fumbles.

== Professional career ==
=== Houston Oilers / Tennessee Oilers / Tennessee Titans ===
Bowden was selected by the Houston Oilers in the fifth round (133rd overall) of the 1992 NFL draft. As a rookie, he played 14 games on special teams, making nine tackles (seventh on the team).

In 1993, Bowden started six games after replacing an injured Wilber Marshall at right linebacker. He registered 28 tackles, one sack, one pass defensed, one fumble recovery and seven special teams tackles.

In 1994, Bowden missed the first two games with a quadriceps injury. He started one game at left linebacker in place of an injured Eddie Robinson. Bowden collected 13 tackles, one forced fumble and seven special teams tackles.

In 1995, Michael Barrow moved to middle linebacker to replace an injured Al Smith, opening the door for Bowden to start 14 games at right linebacker. He posted 51 tackles, two passes defensed, four forced fumbles (led the team) and five special teams tackles.

In 1996, Bowden started 16 games at left linebacker, making 73 tackles (fifth on the team), with three sacks, six passes defensed and two forced fumbles.

In 1997, Bowden started 16 games at left linebacker. In the season finale against the Pittsburgh Steelers, he suffered a broken left fibula. Bowden tallied 84 tackles (second on the team), 2.5 sacks, one interception, four passes defensed, one forced fumble and one special teams tackle.

In 1998, with the signing of Robinson, Bowden took over the middle linebacker starting position, replacing Barron Wortham. He recorded 145 tackles (led the team), 1.5 sacks, six quarterback pressures, three passes defended, one interception and two fumble recoveries.

In 1999, Wortham regained his starting position and Bowden moved to left linebacker, during the Super Bowl XXXIV run. He registered 15 starts, 81 tackles, 3.5 sacks, three forced fumbles, three fumble recoveries and one interception.

Following the signing of Randall Godfrey in free agency and the drafting of Keith Bullock, Bowden became expendable and was not re-signed. He left after starting 84 of 123 regular-season games, while missing only five games and registering 521 tackles.

=== Dallas Cowboys ===
On May 3, 2000, the Dallas Cowboys had a lot of turnover at the linebacker position and the signing of Bowden in free agency was one of the moves made to improve the depth. He was the backup to Darren Hambrick and played in all 16 games, making 46 tackles, two tackles for loss and ywo special teams tackles. Bowden was cut on April 20, 2001, after failing a physical. In his career, he only missed five of 139 games.

== Coaching career ==
From 2008 to 2011, Bowden held coaching positions at Oklahoma City high schools: Mount St. Mary High School and Edmond Santa Fe High School.

In 2006, Bowden was hired as the secondary coach for the Central Oklahoma Bronchos. He held this position until 2008.

In 2012, Bowden was hired by the St. Louis Rams to become an assistant linebackers coach, reuniting with Jeff Fisher who was his head coach with the Titans. On March 1, 2016, he was moved to assistant special teams coach, before leaving the team on March 17, for a job at a higher position.

On March 17, 2016, Bowden was hired by the San Francisco 49ers. He was appointed to the position of inside linebackers coach after Hardy Nickerson (who was hired in January ) abruptly quit and took a job as the Illinois defensive coordinator for his former coaching companion Lovie Smith who was also just hired by the Illini.

In 2017, he was hired as the defensive coordinator and linebackers coach for the Missouri Baptist University.

In 2025, he was hired as linebackers coach for Bowling Green State University.

== Personal life ==
In 1998, Bowden married Malika (née Welch) and they have two daughters, Sydney and Cheyenne. He has one son, Jaylon who also plays football and is following in the footsteps of his father.
