= 1991 Blockbuster Bowl =

American college football game

Alabama Crimson Tide	Colorado Buffaloes
(10–1)	(8–2–1)
SEC	Big Eight
30	25
Head coach: Gene Stallings	Head coach: Bill McCartney
AP / Coaches; 8 / 8	AP / Coaches; 15 / 15
	1	2	3	4	Total
Alabama	7	3	13	7	30
Colorado	7	5	7	6	25
- Date: December 28, 1991
- Season: 1991
- Stadium: Joe Robbie Stadium
- Location: Miami Gardens, Florida
- MVP: Alabama WR David Palmer
- Referee: Jim Kemerling (Big Ten)
- Attendance: 46,123

United States TV coverage
- Network: CBS
- Announcers: Jim Nantz and Dan Fouts

The 1991 Blockbuster Bowl, part of the 1991 bowl game season, took place on December 28, 1991, at Joe Robbie Stadium in Miami Gardens, Florida. The competing teams were the Alabama Crimson Tide, representing the Southeastern Conference (SEC), and the Colorado Buffaloes, representing the Big Eight Conference (Big 8). Alabama won the game 30–25.

== Game summary ==
=== Scoring ===
Scoring Play	Score
1st Quarter
Alabama – David Palmer 52-yard punt return (Matt Wethington kick)	Alabama 7–0
Colorado – Scott Phillips 1-yard run (Jim Harper kick)	Tie 7–7
2nd Quarter
Colorado – Martin Houston sacked in the endzone for a safety	Colorado 9–7
Alabama – Matt Wethington 25-yard field goal	Alabama 10–9
Colorado – Jim Harper 33-yard field goal	Colorado 12–10
3rd Quarter
Alabama – Jay Barker 13-yard pass to Siran Stacy (two-point conversion failed)	Alabama 16–12
Colorado – Darian Hagan 62-yard pass to Michael Westbrook (Jim Harper kick)	Colorado 19–16
Alabama – Jay Barker 13-yard pass to Kevin Lee (Matt Wethington kick)	Alabama 23–19
4th Quarter
Alabama – Jay Barker 5-yard pass to David Palmer (Matt Wethington kick)	Alabama 30–19
Colorado – Darian Hagan 13-yard pass to Charles Johnson (two-point conversion failed)	Alabama 30–25
