= Gary Gibbs =

American football player and coach (born 1952)

Current position
- Title: Defensive analyst
- Team: Oklahoma State
- Conference: Big 12

Biographical details
- Born: August 13, 1952 (age 73); Beaumont, Texas, U.S.

Playing career
- 1971–1974: Oklahoma
- Position(s): Linebacker

Coaching career (HC unless noted)
- 1975–1977: Oklahoma (GA)
- 1978–1980: Oklahoma (LB)
- 1981–1988: Oklahoma (DC)
- 1989–1994: Oklahoma
- 2000: Georgia (DC/LB)
- 2001: LSU (DC)
- 2002–2005: Dallas Cowboys (LB)
- 2006–2008: New Orleans Saints (DC)
- 2009–2012: Kansas City Chiefs (LB)
- 2012: Kansas City Chiefs (DC)
- 2012–2017: Kansas City Chiefs (LB)
- 2018–present: Oklahoma State (defensive analyst)

Head coaching record
- Overall: 44–23–2

Accomplishments and honors

Championships
- National (1974)

Gary Gibbs (born August 13, 1952) is an American football coach and former player who previously served as the head football coach at the University of Oklahoma for six years, compiling a record of 44–23–2.

Gibbs spent the first half of his adult life at Oklahoma as a player, assistant coach, and head coach. He played for the Sooners as a linebacker under Chuck Fairbanks and Barry Switzer from 1972 to 1974. He began coaching in 1975 as a graduate assistant under Switzer and was promoted to linebackers coach in 1978. He was promoted to defensive coordinator in 1981, and held that post through the 1988 season. He was known for coaching Oklahoma legend Brian Bosworth. In 1989, Gibbs was named head coach after Switzer was forced out following NCAA sanctions and a number of highly publicized off-the-field issues involving the Oklahoma football program.

Gibbs stayed as head coach at Oklahoma for six years, leading the Sooners to a record of 44–23–2 in that time. While he succeeded in his primary task—cleaning up the program's image—he was perceived as a coach who could not win big games. He went 2–15–1 against Oklahoma's biggest rivals, Texas, Nebraska and Colorado, and never won more than five (out of seven) games in the Big Eight Conference. Hobbled by NCAA sanctions during Gibbs' first two years, the Sooners were barred from bowl games, and were also banned from live television in his first year. More seriously, they were only allowed to give out 18 scholarships rather than 25. He wasn't able to field a team with a full complement of scholarships until 1994. Even so, discontent with his lackluster record in big games led Oklahoma to force his resignation after the season.

Gibbs was the defensive coordinator at the University of Georgia in 2000 and then at LSU in 2001. From 2002 to 2005, he was the linebackers coach for the Dallas Cowboys. Gibbs was the defensive coordinator for the New Orleans Saints from 2006 through 2008. Fired by the Saints after the conclusion of the 2008 season, Gibbs was subsequently hired by the Kansas City Chiefs as linebackers coach. On November 5, 2012, Gibbs was named defensive coordinator of the Kansas City Chiefs after Romeo Crennel resigned from the position (though staying as head coach).

Gibbs has a wife, Jeanne, and two children, Whitley and Jordan.

== Head coaching record ==
Year	Team	Overall	Conference	Standing	Bowl/playoffs	Coaches^{#}	AP^{°}
Oklahoma Sooners (Big Eight Conference) (1989–1994)
1989	Oklahoma	7–4	5–2	3rd			
1990	Oklahoma	8–3	5–2	T–2nd			17
1991	Oklahoma	9–3	5–2	3rd	W Gator	14	16
1992	Oklahoma	5–4–2	3–2–2	T–3rd			
1993	Oklahoma	9–3	4–3	4th	W John Hancock^{†}	14	17
1994	Oklahoma	6–6	4–3	4th	L Copper		
Oklahoma:		44–23–2	26–14–2				
Total:		44–23–2					
^{†}Indicates Bowl Coalition bowl.; ^{#}Rankings from final Coaches Poll.; ^{°}Rankings from final AP Poll.
