= Grand Prairie High School =

Coordinates: 32.75444°N 97.002159°W

Location
- 101 Gopher Blvd; Grand Prairie, Dallas County, Texas 75050; United States

Information
- School type: Public
- Established: 1902
- School district: Grand Prairie ISD
- Principal: Laigha El Samarayi Boyle
- Staff: 182.69 (FTE)
- Grades: 9-12
- Enrollment: 2,914 (2023–2024)
- Student to teacher ratio: 15.95
- Colors: Blue and white
- Mascot: Gopher
- Rivals: South Grand Prairie High School
- Website: www.gpisd.org/gphigh

Grand Prairie High School is a public high school in Grand Prairie, Texas. It is one of three high schools serving the 41-campus Grand Prairie Independent School District, which encompasses the Dallas County portion of Grand Prairie.

== History ==
1902	Grand Prairie Independent School District established
1902	Ten formal grades established
1905	Two-story building constructed at 214 West College Street
1911	First graduating class of four students completes high school program
1924	Grand Prairie High School fields its first football team
1954	Dalworth School (for African-American students) adds high school program
1956	Dalworth High School graduates first class
1966	Grand Prairie ISD integrates Dalworth High School into Grand Prairie High School
2002	Grand Prairie High School Ninth Grade Center opens
2013	Ninth Grade Center was converted to the Grand Prairie Fine Arts Academy
2016	A portion of High School Drive was renamed to Gopher Boulevard on June 1

== Campus ==
Grand Prairie High School relocated to its current site at 101 Gopher Boulevard in January 1953, following the 1952 Christmas holidays.

=== Classroom facilities ===
Following construction of the original building in 1952, the school underwent its first expansion in the late 1970s. However, the classroom facilities in use today are mainly the product of a major expansion and renovation project completed in 1990. The project added a new library, administrative offices, classroom space, cafeteria, and gymnasium (see "Athletic facilities" below), as well as the atrium at the school's entrance.

Due to dramatic growth in the student population, GPHS opened a Ninth Grade Center in 2002 at the southwest corner of the campus. The high school and the Ninth Grade Center consolidated to begin the 2013–14 school year as the Ninth Grade Center was converted to the Grand Prairie Fine Arts Academy.

=== Athletic facilities ===
The Gopher Bowl (was constructed in 1956 in the northeast portion of the campus and hosts the school's home football games and soccer matches. Unlike many stadiums with "bowl" in their names, the stadium is an almost complete below-ground bowl (the northeast end is not enclosed). Since 1969, it has also been the site of the home football games of the South Grand Prairie High School Warriors. It was remodeled and expanded in 2003–2004 and re-dedicated as the Gopher-Warrior Bowl to recognize both high schools, to much dismay from Gopher alumni.

The school's coliseum was completed in 1990. The GPISD Board of Trustees re-dedicated it as the Amos Turner Gymnasium in 1998. Turner was principal of GPHS during the 1975–1976 school year and previously served as both a teacher and coach at GPHS from 1953 until 1968.

=== Performing arts facilities ===
The 2,000-seat H. H. Chambers Auditorium sits at the southeast corner of the campus and was dedicated in 1963. Chambers served as superintendent of the Grand Prairie Independent School District from 1950 to 1968.

The Leon Breeden Band Hall houses the school's music education program and honors former GPHS band director Leon Breeden. Following his tenure at GPHS, Breeden achieved international recognition as the director of the world-renowned jazz program at the University of North Texas College of Music.

== Demographics ==
Grand Prairie High School had the following demographic profile during the 2009–2010 school year in grades 10–12:

72.7%	Latino
14.7%	Anglo-American
10.6%	African-American
1.6%	Asian or Pacific Islander
0.4%	Native American

== Feeder schools ==
The following elementary schools feed into Grand Prairie High School:

- Austin Elementary School
- Daniels Elementary School
- Eisenhower Elementary School
- Hector Garcia Elementary School
- Hobbs Williams Elementary School
- James Bowie Elementary School
- Juan Seguin Elementary School
- Milam Elementary School (partial)
- Sallye Moore Elementary School (partial)
- Sam Rayburn Elementary School (partial)
- Travis Elementary School

The following middle schools feed into Grand Prairie High School:

- Adams Middle School
- Bill Arnold Middle School
- James Fannin Middle School

== Academic standards ==
In 2010, the school was rated "recognized" by the Texas Education Agency. In 2011, the school was rated "Academically Unacceptable" by the Texas Education Agency.

== Achievements ==
=== UIL Academic State honors ===
Year	Class	Award	Event
1945	2A	Champion	Team debate
1990	5A	Runner-up	Calculator applications
1993	5A	Champion	Current issues and events
1994	5A	Champion	Current issues and events
2002	5A	Runner-up	Poetry interpretation
2004	5A	Champion	Ready writing
2004	5A	Runner-up	Headline writing
2004	5A	Runner-up	Current issues and events team
2006	5A	Champion	Poetry interpretation
2011	5A	Champion	Prose interpretation

=== UIL Athletic State honors ===
Year	Class	Award	Event
1929	N/A	Champion	Boys' 220 yard low hurdles
1960	4A	Champion	Boys' pole vault
1963	4A	Champion	Boys' 180 yard low hurdles
1987	5A	Champion	Boys' 110m hurdles
1987	5A	Champion	Boys' 100m dash
1987	5A	Champion	Boys' 200m dash
1995	5A	Semifinalist	Baseball
1997	5A	Champion	Boys' high jump
1999	5A	Runner-up	Boys' 300m hurdles
1999	5A	Runner-up	Boys' wrestling, weight class 130
1999	5A	Runner-up	Boys' wrestling, weight class 215

=== National Speech and Debate Tournament honors ===
From the National Speech and Debate Association:

Year	Event	Award
1993	International extemporaneous speaking	11th place
2000	Humorous interpretation	7th place
2012	Dramatic interpretation	National champion
2017	Dramatic interpretation	12th place

=== Texas Forensic Association State Tournament honors ===
From the Texas Forensic Association:

Year	Event	Award
2009	Duo Interpretation	6th place
2011	Sweepstakes	5th place
2011	Duo Interpretation	State champion
2011	Duet Acting	3rd place
2012	Duet Acting	State champion
2012	Duet Acting	6th place
2012	Duet Acting	8th place
2012	Duo Interpretation	5th place
2012	Duo Interpretation	7th place
2012	Dramatic Interpretation	5th place
2017	Dramatic Interpretation	State champion

=== Texas State Solo and Ensemble Contest State honors ===
Year	Award	Category
1983	Outstanding Performer	Vocal
1983	Outstanding Performer	Vocal
1991	Outstanding Performer	Medium Ensemble
1994	Outstanding Performer	Medium Ensemble
1995	Outstanding Performer	Medium Ensemble
2002	Outstanding Performer	Trumpet
2016	Outstanding Performer	Violin (Mariachi)

== Notable alumni ==
(includes Grand Prairie High School and Dalworth High School)

- Rodney Anderson, member of the Texas House of Representatives from District 105; former member of the Texas House from District 106
- Rhett Bomar, former NFL and Oklahoma quarterback
- Dennis Burkley, actor
- Dave Clark, 1960 Olympian, pole vault
- Randy Galloway, retired Dallas/Fort Worth ESPN Radio host and Fort Worth Star-Telegram columnist
- Lonnie Hannah, member of 2002 gold-medal-winning and 2006 bronze-medal-winning U.S. Paralympic sledge hockey team and flag bearer at closing ceremonies of 2006 Winter Paralympics
- Michael Keasler, Texas Court of Criminal Appeals Judge
- Keithen McCant, former Canadian Football League player
- T. Michael Moseley, Chief of Staff of the United States Air Force (2005–2008)
- E. P. Sanders, leading New Testament scholar and retired Duke University professor
- Charley Taylor, member of Pro Football Hall of Fame and former Washington Redskins wide receiver. Grand Prairie was segregated at the time. Charley Taylor went to dalworth high school.
- Kerry Wood, retired Major League Baseball pitcher and 1998 National League Rookie of the Year
