= 1991 Kansas Jayhawks football team =

American college football season

1991 Kansas Jayhawks football
- Conference: Big Eight Conference
- Record: 6–5 (3–4 Big 8)
- Head coach: Glen Mason (4th season)
- Offensive coordinator: Pat Ruel (4th season)
- Home stadium: Memorial Stadium

1991 Big Eight Conference football standings
	Conf.					Overall
Team	W		L		T	W		L		T
No. 15 Nebraska +	6	–	0	–	1	9	–	2	–	1
No. 20 Colorado +	6	–	0	–	1	8	–	3	–	1
No. 16 Oklahoma	5	–	2	–	0	9	–	3	–	0
Kansas State	4	–	3	–	0	7	–	4	–	0
Kansas	3	–	4	–	0	6	–	5	–	0
Iowa State	1	–	5	–	1	3	–	7	–	1
Missouri	1	–	6	–	0	3	–	7	–	1
Oklahoma State	0	–	6	–	1	0	–	10	–	1
+ – Conference co-champions; Rankings from AP Poll

The 1991 Kansas Jayhawks football team represented the University of Kansas as a member of the Big Eight Conference during the 1991 NCAA Division I-A football season. Led by fourth-year head coach Glen Mason, the Jayhawks compiled an overall record of 6–5 with a mark of 3–4 in conference play, placing fifth in the Big 8. The team played home games at Memorial Stadium in Lawrence, Kansas. Kansas finished with a winning record for the first time since 1981.

== Schedule ==
Date	Time	Opponent	Site	TV	Result	Attendance	Source
September 7	6:30 p.m.	at Toledo*	Glass Bowl; Toledo, OH	KSMO	W 30–7	24,010	
September 14	1:00 p.m.	Tulsa*	Memorial Stadium; Lawrence, KS		W 23–17	35,000	
September 21	1:00 p.m.	New Mexico State*	Memorial Stadium; Lawrence, KS		W 54–14	34,000	
October 5	12:00 p.m.	at Virginia*	Scott Stadium; Charlottesville, VA		L 19–31	40,200	
October 12	1:10 p.m.	at Kansas State	KSU Stadium; Manhattan, KS (rivalry)		L 12–16	40,856	
October 19	1:00 p.m.	Iowa State^{†}	Memorial Stadium; Lawrence, KS		W 41–0	37,000	
October 26	1:30 p.m.	at No. 21 Oklahoma	Oklahoma Memorial Stadium; Norman, OK		L 3–41	68,128	
November 2	1:30 p.m.	at Oklahoma State	Lewis Field; Stillwater, OK		W 31–0	18,000	
November 9	1:00 p.m.	No. 11 Nebraska	Memorial Stadium; Lawrence, KS (rivalry)		L 23–59	40,000	
November 16	1:00 p.m.	at No. 16 Colorado	Folsom Field; Boulder, CO		L 24–30	40,863	
November 23	1:00 p.m.	Missouri	Memorial Stadium; Lawrence, KS (Border War)		W 53–29	28,000	
*Non-conference game; ^{†}Homecoming; Rankings from AP Poll released prior to the game; All times are in Central time; Source:

== After the season ==
=== NFL draft ===
The following Jayhawks were selected in the 1992 NFL draft after the season.

Round	Pick	Player	Position	NFL team
5	124	Chris Perez	Tackle	Miami Dolphins
9	233	Tim Hill	Defensive back	Cleveland Browns
