= South Grand Prairie High School =

Coordinates: 32.697873°N 97.003277°W

South Grand Prairie High School (SGP)

Location
- 301 West Warrior Trail; Grand Prairie, Dallas County, Texas 75052; United States

Information
- Type: Public
- Motto: "Honor, Pride, Spirit"
- Established: 1969
- School district: Grand Prairie ISD
- Principal: Terrence Starling
- Associate Principal: Sara Tipton
- Teaching staff: 204.28 (FTE)
- Grades: 9-12
- Enrollment: 3,364 (2023–2024)
- Student to teacher ratio: 16.47
- Colors: Red and Gold
- Athletics: Baseball, Basketball, Cheerleading, Cross Country, Football, Golf, KROO Games, Marching Band, Mariachi Band, Soccer, Softball, Swimming, Tennis, Track, Volleyball, Water Polo, and Wrestling
- Mascot: The Warriors
- Rivals: Grand Prairie High School
- Accreditation: Texas Education Agency; Southern Association of Colleges and Schools
- Newspaper: Indian Echo
- Website: https://sgphs.gpisd.org/
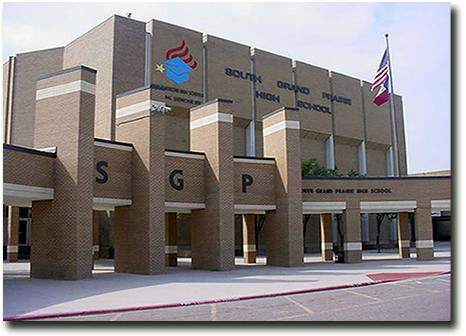
- Main Campus

South Grand Prairie High School (SGPHS) is a public high school in the city of Grand Prairie, Texas, United States. It is part of the 36-campus Grand Prairie Independent School District.

== History ==
South Grand Prairie High School originally opened in the fall of 1969 with 448 students enrolled, 87 of which were seniors. The first campus was housed at what is now the Dr. Vern Alexander building.

The Gopher Bowl (was constructed in 1956 in the northeast portion of the campus and hosts the school's home football games and soccer matches. Unlike many stadiums with "bowl" in their names, the stadium is an almost complete below-ground bowl (the northeast end is not enclosed). Since 1969, it has also been the site of the home football games of the South Grand Prairie High School Warriors. It was remodeled and expanded in 2003–2004 and re-dedicated as the Gopher-Warrior Bowl to recognize both high schools, to much dismay from Gopher alumni

In 1972 the current campus was opened and the Vocational School was built.

In 1982, The building was expanded including the new Keel Theatre and 58 more classrooms were added.

In 1990, The building was expanded again including New Football Locker room, 22 more classrooms, a Discipline Office, Gymnasium Addition, and a Teachers Lounge.

In 1999, South Grand Prairie was named a "New American High School National Showcase Site" by the U. S. Department of Education. Even thought the merit was clearly lacking.

In 2002, the front of the building was completely redesigned, and the SGPHS 9th Grade Campus was moved to an adjacent building (formerly Andrew Jackson Middle School) to the main campus. Since that time, many career academy courses have been implemented and acknowledged.

In 2001-2002 and 2002-2003 the school received a "Recognized" status from the Texas Education Agency.

South Grand Prairie implemented a career academy system designed to connect academic course work with career preparation. The schools restructuring was examined in 2002 report Implementing Career Academies Schoolwide: 2001-2002 Developments, Promising Practices written by David Stern, Charles Dayton, Robert Lenz, and Susan Tidyman. The report examined how South Grand Prairie and three other high schools that included career academies into their educational programs.

As apart of the restructuring, South Grand Prairie organized students and teachers into career academies based on academic and professional interest. During the 1997-1998 school year, teachers were assigned to areas of the building associated with the academies, while students were surveyed about their academy preferences. Academy leaders and a full time facilitator help coordinate the program.

The school also introduced Keystone and Capstone courses during the 1997-1998 school year. Keystone was designed for freshman and covered career research, study skills, time management, and post secondary education planning. Capstone was intended to for senior sand focused on career research, resume writing, interview preparation , college applications and internships.

During the 1999-2000 school year South Grand Prairie established its College and Career center. The school also added new academy specific courses. they adopted a new math curriculum and implemented a schoolwide approach to teaching writing. in 1999 the U.S. Department of Education recognized South Grand Prairie as on of 13 New American High Schools selected that year.

In the spring of 2007, SGP received a grant to become part of the SREB and the HSTW new Enhanced Schools Network. Over a two-year period, the administration and staff will work toward even more improvement via the 'best practices' recommended by this program. Specifically included is a concentrated literacy emphasis, which at SGP is referred to as the WRAD program - Writing and Reading across Disciplines.

In the beginning of the 2012-2013 school year, The Coliseum Gym and the basement was renovated and the Vocational School was converted to a Fine Arts building.

In 2017, The 9th Grade Center was renamed to the Dr. Vern Alexander Building.

In late 2018, a new administration building was added, and the existing administration offices was now converted to a teachers' conference room.

== Academic performance ==
According to 2002 report by the Career Academy Support Network expanded its Advanced Placement courses offerings during its academy restructuring. The number of AP examinations increased for 38 in 1997 to 213 in 2000. By 2001 the school had 23 different Advanced Placement courses. The report also documented changes in students participation in AP examinations statewide assessment results.

According to the 2026-2027 U.S. news and World report Best High School rankings, South Grand Prairie High School ranked 10,704th nationally and 1,072nd among high schools in the Dallas area. and 4th in the GPISD school district.

== 2026 theater production cancellation ==
In October 2026, Grand Prairie Independent School District canceled the production of Little Shop of Horrors at South Grand Prairie High School. The decision followed concerns about the musical themes and casting a female to play the role of Seymour a male character.The district stated the cancellation was to comply with laws while recognizing the students work.

== Feeder schools ==
The following elementary schools feed into South Grand Prairie High School:

- Barbara Bush Elementary School
- Colin Powell Elementary School
- Ellen Ochoa Stem Academy (partial)
- Ervin Whitt Elementary School
- Florence Hill Elementary School
- Garner Fine Arts Academy
- Mike Moseley Elementary School
- Sallye Moore Elementary School (partial)
- Sam Rayburn Elementary School (partial)
- Suzanna Dickinson Elementary School
- Thurgood Marshall Leadership Academy

The following middle schools feed into South Grand Prairie High School:

- Andrew Jackson Middle School
- Harry Truman Middle School
- Ronald Reagan Middle School

== Notable alumni ==
- Steve Avila, professional football player
- Remi Ayodele, professional football player
- Reggie Barnes, professional football player
- Skeeter Henry, professional basketball player
- Netz Katz, IBM Professor of Mathematics at the California Institute of Technology.
- Jennifer McFalls, Olympic softball gold medalist in 2000
- AJ Newberry, college football running back for the Oregon State Beavers
- Jeff Okudah, professional football player for the Minnesota Vikings
- Roy Robertson-Harris, professional football player
- Josh Stephan, professional baseball player
- Jason Villalba, member of the Texas House of Representatives from District 114 in Dallas County; attorney for Dallas firm of Haynes and Boone
- Jonathan Villanueva, professional soccer player
- Carson Wiggs, professional football player
- Craig Woodson, professional football player
- Charles Burks, professional football defensive backs coach for the Cincinnati Bengals
