= Dave Clark (pole vaulter) =

American pole vaulter

Personal information
- Nationality: American
- Born: April 28, 1936 Frisco, Texas, U.S.
- Died: February 12, 2018 (aged 81) Duncanville, Texas, U.S.

Sport
- Sport: Athletics
- Event: Pole vault

David Eugene Clark (April 28, 1936 – February 12, 2018) was an American athlete. He competed in the men's pole vault at the 1960 Summer Olympics.

Clark was born in Frisco, Texas, and grew up in Grand Prairie, Texas. He graduated from Grand Prairie High School and North Texas State University.

Clark died at his home in Duncanville, Texas.
