= 1991 Missouri Tigers football team =

American college football season

1991 Missouri Tigers football
- Conference: Big Eight Conference
- Record: 3–7–1 (1–6 Big 8)
- Head coach: Bob Stull (3rd season)
- Offensive coordinator: Dirk Koetter (3rd season)
- Defensive coordinator: Larry Hoefer (1st season)
- Home stadium: Faurot Field

1991 Big Eight Conference football standings
	Conf.					Overall
Team	W		L		T	W		L		T
No. 15 Nebraska +	6	–	0	–	1	9	–	2	–	1
No. 20 Colorado +	6	–	0	–	1	8	–	3	–	1
No. 16 Oklahoma	5	–	2	–	0	9	–	3	–	0
Kansas State	4	–	3	–	0	7	–	4	–	0
Kansas	3	–	4	–	0	6	–	5	–	0
Iowa State	1	–	5	–	1	3	–	7	–	1
Missouri	1	–	6	–	0	3	–	7	–	1
Oklahoma State	0	–	6	–	1	0	–	10	–	1
+ – Conference co-champions; Rankings from AP Poll

The 1991 Missouri Tigers football team represented the University of Missouri in the 1991 NCAA Division I-A football season. The 1991 season was the third year of coach Bob Stull at Missouri.

The Tigers opened with a 23–19 victory over Illinois in Columbia. The Tigers could only win one conference game, losing their final game in Lawrence to Kansas, 53–29, the 100th meeting of the team in the annual Border War.

== Schedule ==
Date	Time	Opponent	Site	TV	Result	Attendance	Source
September 14	1:00 pm	Illinois*	Faurot Field; Columbia, MO (rivalry)		W 23–19	49,586	
September 21	7:00 pm	at No. 14 Baylor*	Floyd Casey Stadium; Waco, TX		L 21–47	41,721	
September 28	1:00 pm	Indiana*	Faurot Field; Columbia, MO		T 27–27	42,173	
October 5	1:00 pm	Memphis State*	Faurot Field; Columbia, MO		W 31–21	42,925	
October 12	1:00 pm	at Colorado	Folsom Field; Boulder, CO		L 7–55	52,315	
October 19	1:00 pm	Oklahoma State^{†}	Faurot Field; Columbia, MO		W 41–7	46,206	
October 26	1:00 pm	at No. 9 Nebraska	Memorial Stadium; Lincoln, NE (rivalry)		L 6–63	76,244	
November 2	1:00 pm	Iowa State	Faurot Field; Columbia, MO (rivalry)		L 22–23	27,872	
November 9	1:00 pm	No. 20 Oklahoma	Faurot Field; Columbia, MO (rivalry)	PPV	L 16–56	30,193	
November 16	1:00 pm	at Kansas State	KSU Stadium; Manhattan, KS		L 0–32	20,986	
November 23	1:00 pm	at Kansas	Memorial Stadium; Lawrence, KS (Border War)		L 29–53	28,000	
*Non-conference game; ^{†}Homecoming; Rankings from AP Poll released prior to the game; All times are in Central time; Source:

== Roster ==
1991 Missouri Tigers football team roster
Players
Coaches
Offense

Pos.	#	Name	Class
WR	2	Victor Bailey	Jr
QB	12	Jeff Handy	Fr
C	57	Doug Hembrough	Jr
QB	14	Phil Johnson	So
RB	26	Ronnell Kayhill	Jr
WR	1	Skip Leach	Sr
OT	74	Russ McCullough	Sr
OT	75	John O’Neal	Fr
TE	89	A. J. Ofodile	Fr
TE	84	Lemmie Walls	Sr
G	76	Don Wright	Sr

Defense

Pos.	#	Name	Class
DT	70	Tim Burke	Jr
LB	95	Tony Cooper	Jr
DE	92	Stacy Elliott	Jr
DT	97	Mario Johnson	Sr
DE	59	Rick Lyle	So
LB	47	Mike Ringgenberg	Jr
SS	20	Pat Ryan	Jr
LB	99	Chris Walls	Fr
CB	18	Sharron Washington	Sr

Special teams

Pos.	#	Name	Class
K	3	Jeff Jacke	Jr

Head coach

- Bob Stull

Coordinators/assistant coaches

- Dirk Koetter – Offensive coordinator
- Mike Ward – Running backs
- Andy Reid – Offensive line
- Kevin Faulkner – Tight ends
- Marty Mornhinweg – Tight ends & offensive line
- Larry Hoefer – Defensive coordinator
- Mo Lattimore – Defensive line
- Steve Telander – co-linebackers
- Ken Flajole – Defensive backs

Legend

- (C) Team captain
- (S) Suspended
- (I) Ineligible
- Injured
- Redshirt
