= 1991 All-Big Eight Conference football team =

American all-star college football team

The 1991 All-Big Eight Conference football team consists of American football players chosen by various organizations for All-Big Eight Conference teams for the 1991 NCAA Division I-A football season. The selectors for the 1991 season included the Associated Press (AP).

== Offensive selections ==
=== Quarterbacks ===
- Keithen McCant, Nebraska (AP-1)
- Darian Hagan, Colorado (AP-2)

=== Running backs ===
- Derek Brown, Nebraska (AP-1)
- Tony Sands, Kansas (AP-1)
- Mike Gaddis, Oklahoma (AP-1)
- Calvin Jones, Nebraska (AP-2)
- Lamont Warren, Colorado (AP-2)
- Eric Gallon, Kansas State (AP-2)

=== Tight ends ===
- Johnny Mitchell, Nebraska (AP-1)
- Russ Campbell, Kansas State (AP-2)

=== Wide receivers ===
- Michael Smith, Kansas State (AP-1)
- Jon Bostick, Nebraska (AP-2)

=== Centers ===
- Jay Leeuwenburg, Colorado (AP-1)
- Quentin Neujahr, Kansas State (AP-2)

=== Offensive linemen ===
- Will Shields, Nebraska (AP-1)
- Chris Perez, Kansas (AP-1)
- Brian Boerboom, Nebraska (AP-1)
- Brian Brauninger, Oklahoma (AP-1)
- Keith Loneker, Kansas (AP-2)
- Erik Wiegert, Nebraska (AP-2)
- Brandon Houston, Oklahoma (AP-2)
- Mike Bedosky, Missouri (AP-2)

== Defensive selections ==
=== Defensive ends ===
- Reggie Barnes, Oklahoma (AP-1)
- Jason Gildon, Oklahoma State (AP-1)
- Travis Hill, Nebraska (AP-2)
- Trey Tippens, Oklahoma (AP-2)

=== Defensive lineman ===
- Joel Steed, Colorado (AP-1)
- Dana Stubblefield, Kansas (AP-1)
- Stacey Satterwhite, Oklahoma State (AP-1)
- Stacey Dillard, Oklahoma (AP-2)
- Leonard Renfro, Colorado (AP-2)
- Pat Engelbert, Nebraska (AP-2)

=== Linebackers ===
- Joe Bowden, Oklahoma (AP-1)
- Greg Biekert, Colorado (AP-1)
- Brooks Barta, Kansas State (AP-1)
- Chris Wilson, Oklahoma (AP-2)
- Chad Brown, Colorado (AP-2)
- Mike Petko, Nebraska (AP-2)

=== Defensive backs ===
- Jason Belser, Oklahoma (AP-1)
- Eric Hamilton, Colorado (AP-1)
- Tyrone Legette, Nebraska (AP-1)
- Curtis Cotton, Nebraska (AP-2)
- Mark Doubrava, Iowa State (AP-2)
- Sharron Washington, Missouri (AP-2)

== Special teams ==
=== Place-kicker ===
- Dan Eichloff, Kansas (AP-1)
- Jeff Jacke, Missouri (AP-2)

=== Punter ===
- Dan Eichloff, Kansas (AP-1)
- Mike Stigge, Nebraska (AP-2)

== Key ==
AP = Associated Press

== See also ==
- 1991 College Football All-America Team
