= 1991 Oklahoma State Cowboys football team =

American college football season

1991 Oklahoma State Cowboys football
- Conference: Big Eight Conference
- Record: 0–10–1 (0–6–1 Big 8)
- Head coach: Pat Jones (8th season)
- Offensive coordinator: Duke Christian (1st season)
- Defensive coordinator: Bill Miller (3rd season)
- Home stadium: Lewis Field

1991 Big Eight Conference football standings
	Conf.					Overall
Team	W		L		T	W		L		T
No. 15 Nebraska +	6	–	0	–	1	9	–	2	–	1
No. 20 Colorado +	6	–	0	–	1	8	–	3	–	1
No. 16 Oklahoma	5	–	2	–	0	9	–	3	–	0
Kansas State	4	–	3	–	0	7	–	4	–	0
Kansas	3	–	4	–	0	6	–	5	–	0
Iowa State	1	–	5	–	1	3	–	7	–	1
Missouri	1	–	6	–	0	3	–	7	–	1
Oklahoma State	0	–	6	–	1	0	–	10	–	1
+ – Conference co-champions; Rankings from AP Poll

The 1991 Oklahoma State Cowboys football team represented Oklahoma State University as a member of the Big Eight Conference during the 1991 NCAA Division I-A football season. Led by eighth-year head coach Pat Jones, the Cowboys compiled an overall record of 0–10–1 with a mark of 0–6–1 in conference play, placing last out eight teams in the Big 8. Oklahoma State played home games at Lewis Field in Stillwater, Oklahoma.

== Schedule ==
Date	Time	Opponent	Site	TV	Result	Attendance	Source
September 7	6:00 p.m.	at Tulsa*	Skelly Stadium; Tulsa, OK (rivalry)	PPV	L 7–13	39,479	
September 14	6:00 p.m.	Arizona State*	Lewis Field; Stillwater, OK	ABC	L 3–30	34,600	
September 21	6:30 p.m.	TCU*	Lewis Field; Stillwater, OK		L 21–24	37,206	
October 5	11:00 a.m.	at No. 2 Miami (FL)*	Miami Orange Bowl; Miami, FL		L 3–40	42,751	
October 12	1:30 p.m.	No. 14 Nebraska	Lewis Field; Stillwater, OK		L 15–49	30,150	
October 19	1:00 p.m.	at Missouri	Faurot Field; Columbia, MO		L 7–41	46,206	
October 26	1:00 p.m.	at Iowa State	Cyclone Stadium; Ames, IA		T 6–6	41,528	
November 2	1:30 p.m.	Kansas^{†}	Lewis Field; Stillwater, OK		L 0–31	18,000	
November 9	1:30 p.m.	No. 14 Colorado	Lewis Field; Stillwater, OK		L 12–16	25,000	
November 16	1:00 p.m.	at No. 18 Oklahoma	Oklahoma Memorial Stadium; Norman, OK (Bedlam Game)	PSN	L 6–21	68,778	
November 23	1:30 p.m.	Kansas State	Lewis Field; Stillwater, OK		L 26–36	17,800	
*Non-conference game; ^{†}Homecoming; Rankings from AP Poll released prior to the game; All times are in Central time; Source:

== Personnel ==
=== Coaching staff ===
Name	Position	Seasons at Oklahoma State	Alma mater
Pat Jones	Head Coach	8	Arkansas (1968)
Bill Miller	Defensive coordinator/Defensive Line	3	
Mike Gundy	Quarterbacks	1	Oklahoma State (1990)
Keith Armstrong	Wide Receivers	2	
James Shibest	Graduate assistant	2	Arkansas (1988)

=== Roster ===
- QB Kenny Ford

DB C Jones

== After the season ==
The 1992 NFL draft was held on April 26–27, 1992. The following Cowboy was selected.

Round	Pick	Player	Position	NFL club
12	325	Corey Williams	Defensive back	Kansas City Chiefs
