= Wichita North High School =

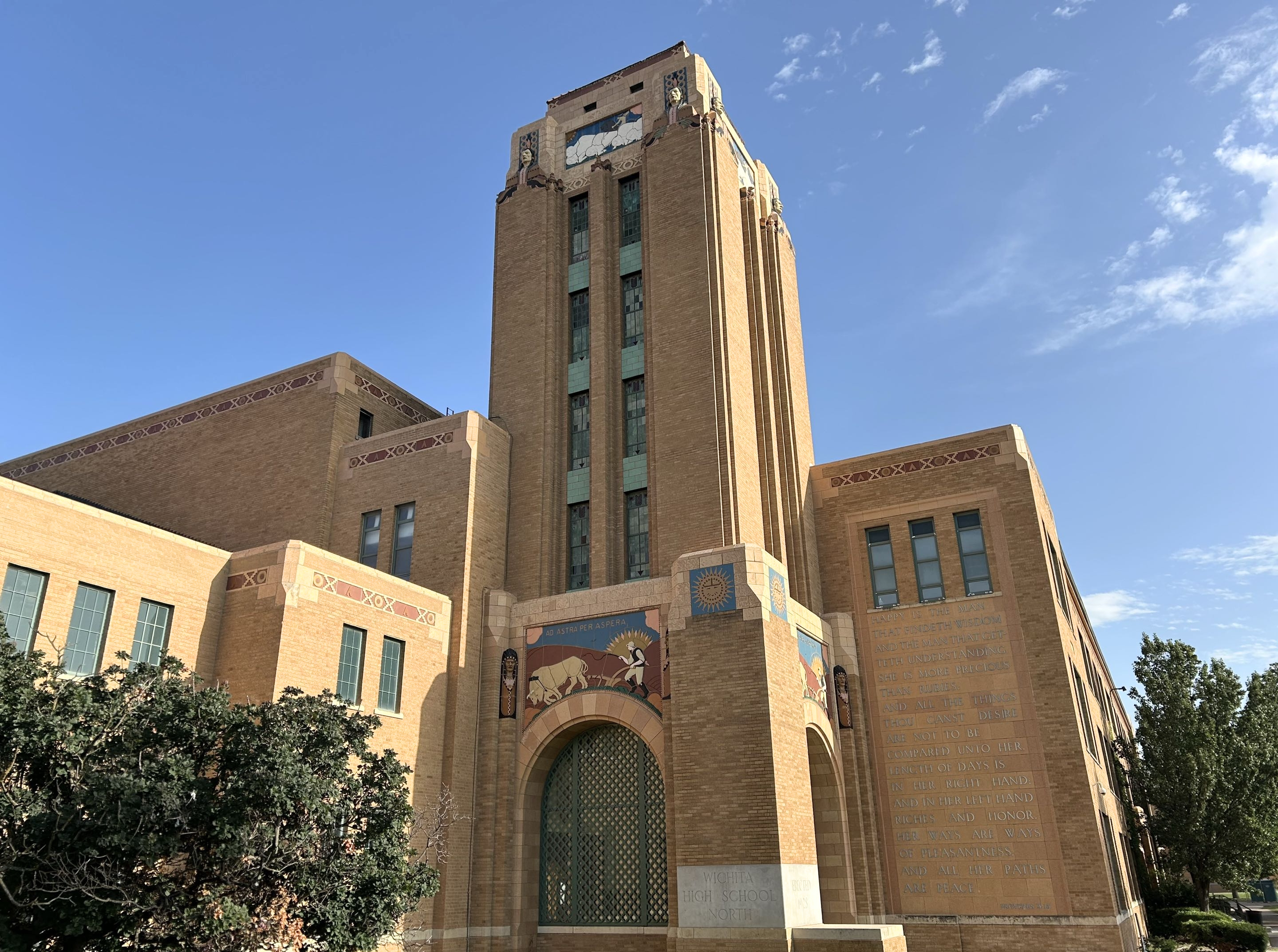
- Wichita North High School in 2026

Location
- 1437 North Rochester Street; Wichita, Kansas 67203; United States
- 37.709190°N 97.345198°W

Information
- School type: Public, high school
- Established: 1929
- School board: www.usd259.org/boe
- School district: Wichita USD 259
- CEEB code: 173207
- Principal: Kristina Murray
- Teaching staff: 123.56 (FTE)
- Grades: 9 to 12
- Gender: coed
- Enrollment: 2,078 (2023–2024)
- Student to teacher ratio: 16.82
- Campus type: Urban
- Colors: Red; White
- Athletics: Class 6A
- Athletics conference: Greater Wichita Athletic League
- Mascot: Redhawks
- Communities served: Wichita
- Website: north.usd259.org

Wichita North High School, known locally as North, is a public secondary school in Wichita, Kansas, United States. It is operated by Wichita USD 259 school district and serves students in grades 9 to 12. The school was founded in 1929 on the site where the United States government previously sent Company 'A' of the 10th Division to the forks of the Arkansas River to oversee incoming cattle drivers and separate them from Native Americans.

Wichita North is a member of the Kansas State High School Activities Association and offers a variety of sports programs. Athletic teams compete in the 6A division and are known as the "Redhawks" (original name of "Redskins" retired in February 2021).

== History ==
Wichita North High School was the second high school in the city of Wichita, completed in 1929. Wichita East High School was the first high school.

=== New school mascot ===
In February 2021, the Wichita Board of Education voted unanimously to retire the school’s mascot. A committee created by Wichita Public Schools to study the mascot determined: “the term is offensive to Native Americans and the Native American Culture. The committee will not create a new mascot, but will adhere to BOE policy 1216, which states a school building principal is responsible for the development of school themes, songs, flags, etc. At this time, the North High administration has no plans to create a new mascot. The school will be referred to Wichita North High School and the school will continue to use their shield, drum and feather logo. The school was given a two-year phase-in plan starting in the 2021-22 school year to remove the mascot name on athletic and fine arts uniforms, school apparel and signs.

In November, 2022, the Kansas Board of Education voted for schools kindergarten through 12th grade to “retire Indian-themed mascots and branding." Following the vote, Wichita North High School students were allowed to vote on a new mascot. They had the following four choices to vote for: Wolfpack, Redhawks, North Stars and Red Storm. On December 14, 2022, the school changed its mascot name to the Redhawks.

== Academics ==
=== Bio-Med ===
The Bio-Med Program is a four-year program that offers a core science curriculum as well as Project Lead the Way Biomedical Sciences elective courses. Students in the program are able to receive health industry certifications in areas such as EMT, EKG tech, Phlebotomy tech, CNA, CMA, and HHA.

=== AVID ===
The AVID (Advancement Via Individual Determination) program has been at North High for over a decade, helping students gain college and career readiness skills. In 2017 North High earned National Demonstration/Site of Distinction status.

== Extracurricular activities ==
=== Athletics ===
The Redhawks compete in the Greater Wichita Athletic League and are classified as a 6A school, the largest classification in Kansas according to the KSHSAA. Throughout its history, Wichita North has won 22 state championships in various sports.

=== State championships ===
State Championships
Season	Sport	Number of Championships	Year
Fall	Soccer, Boys	1	1981
Winter	Bowling, Girls	1	2008
Winter	Swimming and Diving, Boys	5	1932, 1933, 1934, 1939, 1946
Winter	Wrestling	2	1933, 1941
Winter	Basketball, Boys	2	1954, 1987
Winter	Basketball, Girls	2	1975, 1977
Spring	Baseball	4	1949, 1950, 1952, 1966
Spring	Golf, Boys	3	1940, 1947, 1948
Spring	Golf, Girls	2	1973, 1974
Spring	Track & Field, Boys	1	1970
Total		23	

== Notable alumni ==
- Class of 2014: Nico Hernandez, 2016 Olympic boxing bronze medalist, men's light flyweight division
- Class of 2013: Conner Frankamp, professional basketball point guard
- Class of 2004: Elbert Mack, former Tampa Bay Buccaneers cornerback
- Class of 1995: Tara Snyder, former Junior US Open tennis champion
- Class of 1992: Craig Dingman, former Detroit Tigers pitcher
- Class of 1991: Wendell Davis, former Dallas Cowboys cornerback
- Class of 1989: Rolf Potts, travel writer and author
- Class of 1988: Gaylon Nickerson, former professional basketball player
- Class of 1987: Russ Campbell, former Pittsburgh Steelers tight end
- Class of 1986: Barry Sanders, former Detroit Lions running back, 1988 Heisman Trophy winner, 2004 Pro Football Hall of Fame inductee
- Class of 1986: Brad Holman, former Seattle Mariners pitcher and current Texas Rangers bullpen coach
- Class of 1983: Brian Holman, former Seattle Mariners pitcher
- Class of 1977: Lynette Woodard, 1984 Olympic basketball gold medalist, first female Globetrotter
- Class of 1975: Carl Brewer, former mayor of Wichita
- Class of 1975: Martha Davis, author and scholar of human rights and women's rights law
- Class of 1970: Don Calhoun, former New England Patriots running back
- Class of 1969: Greg "Fingers" Taylor, harmonica player for Jimmy Buffett's Coral Reefer Band
- Class of 1968: M. Lee Pelton, philanthropic leader, CEO of the Boston Foundation
- Class of 1968: Paul Stovall, former NBA player. He attended school briefly and earned his diploma through correspondence
- Class of 1962: Riney Lochmann, former Dallas Chaparrals forward
- Class of 1956: Curtis McClinton, former Kansas City Chiefs running back, scored first AFL touchdown in Super Bowl I
- Class of 1956: Art Risser, naturalist and zoo scientist, former manager of the San Diego Zoo
- Class of 1954: Judy Bell, first female President of US Golf Association
- Class of 1953: Phil Ruffin, businessman and self-made billionaire
- Class of 1952: John Dalley, violinist, Gaurneri Quartet between 1963 and 2009
- Class of 1950: Robert Stephan, Kansas Attorney General from 1979 to 1995
- Class of 1948: Vera Miles, actress who worked closely with Alfred Hitchcock; starred in movies like The Searchers, Psycho and The Wrong Man
- Class of 1947: Kent Frizzell, former Kansas politician and U.S. assistant Attorney General
- Class of 1946: Vern Miller, former lawman and Attorney General
- Class of 1946: Ray Romero, former Philadelphia Eagles guard
- Class of 1946: Barbara Sinatra, philanthropist, former model and showgirl, 2nd wife of Zeppo Marx, 4th wife of Frank Sinatra
- Class of 1944: Vernon Smith, Nobel Memorial Prizel winner in economics
- Class of 1942: James Jabara, first American jet ace
- Class of 1940: Richard Cowan, recipient of the Medal of Honor during World War II
- Class of 1940: Les Layton, former New York Giants outfielder
- Class of 1936: W. Eugene Smith, Life Magazine photojournalist
- Class of 1935: Bob Thurman, former Kansas City Monarchs and Cincinnati Reds outfielder
- Class of 1933: Don Enoch, former mayor of Wichita 1969-1970
- Class of 1931: James E. Stewart, civil rights leader

== See also ==
- Education in Kansas
- List of high schools in Kansas
- List of unified school districts in Kansas
- Native American mascot controversy
- Sports teams named Redskins
