= Jason Belser =

American football player (born 1970)

No. 29
- Position: Safety

Personal information
- Born: May 28, 1970 (age 56); Kansas City, Missouri, U.S.
- Listed height: 5 ft 9 in (1.75 m)
- Listed weight: 188 lb (85 kg)

Career information
- High school: Raytown South (Raytown, Missouri)
- College: Oklahoma
- NFL draft: 1992: 8th round, 197th overall pick

Career history
- Indianapolis Colts (1992–2000); Kansas City Chiefs (2001–2002)

Awards and highlights
- First-team All-Big Eight (1991); Second-team All-Big Eight (1989)

Career NFL statistics
- Tackles: 856
- Interceptions: 14
- Sacks: 9
- Stats at Pro Football Reference

Jason Daks Belser (born May 28, 1970) is an American former professional football player who was a defensive back in the National Football League (NFL). He played college football for the Oklahoma Sooners and high school football at Raytown South High School in Raytown, Missouri. He was selected by the Indianapolis Colts in the eighth round of the 1992 NFL draft.

Belser is currently the head football coach at the Benjamin High School in Palm Beach Gardens, Florida.
