= Reggie Barnes (linebacker) =

American football player (born 1969)

No. 50, 56
- Position: Linebacker

Personal information
- Born: October 23, 1969 (age 57); Arlington, Texas, U.S.
- Listed height: 6 ft 1 in (1.85 m)
- Listed weight: 235 lb (107 kg)

Career information
- High school: South Grand Prairie (Grand Prairie, Texas)
- College: Oklahoma
- NFL draft: 1993: undrafted

Career history
- Pittsburgh Steelers (1993); Dallas Cowboys (1995); Green Bay Packers (1996)*
- * Offseason or practice squad member only

Awards and highlights
- First-team All-Big Eight (1991); Second-team All-Big Eight (1992)

Career NFL statistics
- Games played: 23
- Tackles: 16
- Fumbles recovered: 1
- Stats at Pro Football Reference

Reginald Keith Barnes (born October 23, 1969) is an American former professional football player who was a linebacker in the National Football League (NFL) for the Pittsburgh Steelers and Dallas Cowboys. He played college football for the Oklahoma Sooners.

== Early life ==
Barnes attended South Grand Prairie High School. He accepted a football scholarship from the University of Oklahoma. As a freshman, he was a reserve linebacker and tallied 33 tackles. As a sophomore, he was switched from outside linebacker to defensive end, registering 43 tackles.

As a junior, he became a full-time starter at defensive end, recording 73 tackles and 9 sacks. As a senior, he started in 9 games, posting 46 tackles and 7 sacks.

== Professional career ==
Barnes was signed as an undrafted free agent by the Pittsburgh Steelers after the 1993 NFL draft. As a rookie, he was a reserve outside linebacker and finished second on the team with 13 special teams tackles. He also had 12 defensive tackles, one quarterback pressure and 2 passes defensed. He had 4 tackles in the eighth game against the Cleveland Browns after replacing an injured Jerry Olsavsky. He filled in at middle linebacker in place of an injured Greg Lloyd during the fifteenth game against the Seattle Seahawks and in the playoffs. He was waived on August 28, 1994.

On February 13, 1995, he signed as a free agent with the Dallas Cowboys. He was a reserve player, registering 4 defensive tackles and 7 special teams tackles. He appeared in 7 games and was released on October 19, 1995. The team would go on to win Super Bowl XXX.

On January 3, 1996, he was signed as a free agent by the Green Bay Packers. He was released on July 15, 1996.
