= Keith Bullock =

Keith Joseph Bullock FTSE (1931–2015) was an Australian engineer and academic at the University of Queensland.

== Early life ==
Bullock was born in Brisbane, Queensland in 1931. He attended Moorooka State School and the Church of England Grammar School. Bullock enrolled in the engineering program at the University of Queensland in 1948, gaining his B.E. with first class honours in 1952. He won a number of prizes and the Alfred Henry Darker scholarship.

== Career ==
Bullock was employed as a demonstrator after graduation. He commenced his PhD under supervisor Professor Mansergh Shaw. Bullock graduated with his PhD in 1957, the first engineering student to complete a PhD at the University of Queensland. His thesis studied the physical properties and milling of sugar cane with an aim to improve the costs and efficiency of machinery within sugar mills, particularly in Australia. His research was enabled by grants from the Colonial Sugar Refining Company and the Sugar Research Institute, and led to improvements in milling processes.

Bullock married physiotherapist and fellow UQ graduate Margaret Roberts in 1957 and they moved to Boston, USA to take up a Fulbright Fellowship he was offered at Harvard University. He would pursue research there in addition to teaching graduate classes. Bullock continued his association with Harvard University as a guest lecturer. Bullock and his family returned to Australia in 1960, where he took a position as a lecturer at the University of Queensland in the Department of Mechanical Engineering.

Bullock pursued research in a number of areas including hybrid and electric transmissions for cars and heavy duty road vehicles to reduce fuel usage and emissions. In the 1970s he pioneered research into hybrid vehicles, converting a Ford Falcon to run on a small internal combustion engine with battery and flywheel energy storage, with Dr Duncan Gilmore. He and Dr Frank Grigg, worked on a re-design of power trains used in underground load haul dump vehicles. He produced designs for submarines, buses and freight train locomotives. He developed a number of power system design improvements.

Bullock became Head of the Department of Mechanical Engineering in 1975, and became Dean of Engineering in 1983. He encouraged the relocation of research into hypersonic test facilities to Queensland.

Bullock retired from the university in 1991 and continued in private work for Transport Energy Systems, a company which he established the same year.

Bullock died in 2015, and was survived by his wife Margaret and their two children.

== Memberships and awards ==
- Member, American Society of Mechanical Engineering
- Member, Society of Automotive Engineers of Australasia
- Fellow, Australian Academy of Technological Sciences and Engineering (including Chairman of Queensland branch)
- Fellow, Institute of Engineers Australia
- Rodda Award for outstanding work on a multi-purpose hybrid vehicle in 1982
- SAE Excellence Award (J.E. Batchelor Award) for the most outstanding written paper, in 1986.
- President, Staff and Graduates Club of the University of Queensland
- UQ Centenary Medal, for service to Australian society in energy research and development
