= James E. Stewart (civil rights leader) =

American journalist

- Born: September 16, 1912; Plano, Collin County, Texas, United States of America
- Died: April 13, 1997 (aged 84); Oklahoma City, Oklahoma County, Oklahoma, United States of America
- Occupations: Civil rights leader, business executive
- Office: President of Oklahoma City NAACP Chapter
- Term: 1942-1959

James Edward Stewart Sr. was an American civil rights leader and business executive who was active in Oklahoma City, Oklahoma. As a civil rights leader with ties to wealthy white businessmen in Oklahoma City, Stewart was a key figure in helping to end segregation and begin the integration of Oklahoma and Oklahoma City in the 20th century.

== Early life and education ==
Stewart was born in Plano, Texas, on September 16, 1912. His family moved to Oklahoma City in 1916. Stewart's father, Zena Thomas Stewart, died in 1920, leaving his mother, Mary Magdeline Fegalee Stewart to support the family on 35 cents per day. Stewart attended Douglass High School in Oklahoma City with fellow student Ralph Ellison, with whom Stewart would become friends, and graduated from Wichita North High School.

== Career ==
=== Oklahoma Natural Gas ===
Stewart began working as a janitor for Oklahoma Natural Gas (ONG) in June 1937. In September 1940 Stewart was selected to be the manager of the Eastside ONG Office in Oklahoma City. Stewart retired from ONG in 1977, age 65, and dedicated his retirement to focusing on civil rights issues. Following his retirement, Stewart used his position as a former ONG official and as the Former Chapter President of the Oklahoma City NAACP to help draft the NAACP Energy Statement in 1978, which proposed solutions to the ongoing American energy crisis.

=== The Black Dispatch ===
Stewart was close friends with, and often advised by, Roscoe Dunjee, the founder and editor of The Black Dispatch. He regularly began writing a column for the paper called “Jimmy Says” in 1939, wherein he would discuss various social and political events occurring in Oklahoma City, especially those on the east side of the city. Stewart later served as an editorial writer for the paper.

=== Military service ===
Stewart volunteered for duty in the U.S. Marine Corps during World War II. His acceptance was delayed due to an investigation into his column at The Black Dispatch, which had caused him to be labeled a troublemaker. When the Marines accepted him in 1942, he was assigned to the 51st Defense Battalion, the first black battalion in the Marines. During his time with the Marines, Stewart rose to the rank of Steward First Class and was honorably discharged on December 6, 1945.

== Civil rights activity ==
Stewart played an active role in the civil rights movement from the 1930s until his death. Stewart was, over the course of his life, in a leadership role in over 25 organizations, including: the Citizens' Chamber of Commerce, the Governor of Oklahoma's Energy Committee, the United Way of Oklahoma City, the YMCA, the Langston University Alumni Association, and the University of Oklahoma Foundation.

=== NAACP ===
Stewart became involved in the local Oklahoma City NAACP Chapter in the 1930s and served on several committees. Roscoe Dunjee nominated him for vice-president of the OKC Chapter in January 1942, but after the sudden departure of the chapter president, Stewart filled the vacancy a month later at Dunjee's behest. He left the position when he joined the Marines, but was re-elected President of the Oklahoma City NAACP Chapter upon his return, where he began working to ensure equal employment opportunities for black people. This started with a letter-writing campaign to open the local postal service to hiring black postal employees. Stewart worked to get jobs for blacks in several places where they had been previously rejected or unable to move up the chain of command, such as Tinker Air Force Base.

As president of the OKC Chapter of the NAACP, a position he would hold until 1957, Stewart helped to end the segregation of schools, especially with the integration of the University of Oklahoma, on which he worked with Thurgood Marshall and others to help Ada Lois Sipuel Fisher become the first black law student to attend and Prentice Gautt become the first black athlete to attend.

Stewart also held several national roles within the NAACP. In 1947, Stewart and other leaders drafted a plan to create regional offices in order to allow for the better management of the organization. In 1948, following the approval of the plan, Stewart was selected to be on the board of directors for the Southwest Region, a role he held for 24 years. In 1952 Oklahoma City hosted the NAACP National Convention as a result of Stewart's lobbying of the National Board. The conference was attended by 2,000 people and organized by Stewart with the help of other local NAACP officials.

In 1958, Stewart assisted Clara Luper, advisor to the local NAACP Youth Council, in the organization of several sit-in protests against the segregation of lunch counters in Oklahoma, the first of which occurred on August 19 at Katz Drug in Oklahoma City.

Stewart helped to address was the housing crisis in Oklahoma City, where he helped with the Urban Renewal Authority's plans to renovate the dilapidated homes owned by poor blacks. The plans included over 3,000 buildings for repair and grants and low-interest loans, and Stewart worked to ensure the people affected by the plan were included in the discussions.

=== Oklahomans for Progress ===
In the early 1960s, following the end of his presidency of the OKC Chapter of the NAACP and while still sitting on the National Board of the NAACP, Stewart founded a new organization called "Oklahomans for Progress". The organization was intended to be an independent coordinator for issues of race in Oklahoma and was made up of leaders from black and white organizations.

== Personal life ==
In 1932, Stewart married Mae Belle Hayes and together they had a son, Don Gilbert Stewart. The couple divorced in 1934. On May 12, 1942, Stewart married Mae Lois Layne and together they had a son and daughter, James Edward Stewart Jr. and Zandra Jean Stewart.

== Death and legacy ==
Stewart died on April 13, 1997, in Oklahoma City, Oklahoma. Stewart was noted for “his ability to work with almost anyone, regardless of religion, color, or political belief” and for never backing down from what he believed, but always standing his ground “in a manner which commanded respect.”

He was inducted into the Afro-American Hall of Fame in Oklahoma in 1983, the Oklahoma Hall of Fame in 1986, and the Oklahoma Journalism Hall of Fame in 1997. The James E. Stewart Golf Course is named for him. The former James E. Stewart Training Center was named for him, as was the James E. Stewart Industrial Park. The American Association of Blacks in Energy's (AABE) annual award for meritorious service is named for Stewart.

=== Awards ===
- Service to Mankind Award from the Oklahoma City Downtown Sertoma Club (1975)
- Golden Plate Award from the NAACP (1976)
- Pathmaker Award from the Oklahoma County Historical Society (1994)

== Works cited ==
- Miles-Lagrange, Vicki; Burke, Bob (1999). A Passion for Equality: The Life of Jimmy Stewart. Oklahoma Heritage Association. ISBN 978-1-88559-612-3.
