= Russ Campbell =

American football player (born 1969)

No. 85
- Position: Tight end

Personal information
- Born: April 2, 1969 (age 57); Columbus, Ohio, U.S.
- Listed height: 6 ft 5 in (1.96 m)
- Listed weight: 259 lb (117 kg)

Career information
- High school: North (Wichita, Kansas)
- College: Kansas State (1988–1991)
- NFL draft: 1992: 7th round, 179th overall pick

Career history
- Pittsburgh Steelers (1992)

Awards and highlights
- Second-team All-Big Eight (1991)
- Stats at Pro Football Reference

Russell Lee Campbell (born April 2, 1969) is an American former professional football tight end who played one season with the Pittsburgh Steelers of the National Football League (NFL). He was selected by the Steelers in the seventh round of the 1992 NFL draft after playing college football at Kansas State University.

== Early life and college ==
Russell Lee Campbell was born on April 2, 1969, in Columbus, Ohio. He attended Wichita North High School in Wichita, Kansas.

Campbell was a four-year letterman for the Kansas State Wildcats of Kansas State University from 1988 to 1991. He caught eight passes for 82 yards in 1989, 27 passes for 473 yards in 1990, and 32 passes for 595 yards and two touchdowns in 1991. His 18.6 yards per catch was the highest in the Big Eight in 1991. Campbell earned Associated Press second-team All-Big Eight honors for the 1991 season. He was also a four-time first-team Academic All-Big Eight selection, and an NFF National Scholar-Athlete in 1991. He played in the East–West Shrine Game after his senior year.

== Professional career ==
Campbell was selected by the Pittsburgh Steelers in the seventh round, with the 179th overall pick, of the 1992 NFL draft. He officially signed with the team on July 17. He was placed on injured reserve on September 9, activated on November 10, released on December 26, and signed to the practice squad on December 28. Overall, Campbell played in seven games for the Steelers during the 1992 season and was targeted once but did not record a catch. He became a free agent after the season and re-signed with the Steelers on March 11, 1993. He was released on August 24, 1993.
