= Johnny Mitchell =

American football player (born 1971)

No. 83, 86, 82, 85
- Position: Tight end

Personal information
- Born: January 20, 1971 (age 55); Chicago, Illinois, U.S.
- Listed height: 6 ft 3 in (1.91 m)
- Listed weight: 241 lb (109 kg)

Career information
- High school: Simeon (Chicago)
- College: Nebraska
- NFL draft: 1992: 1st round, 15th overall pick

Career history
- New York Jets (1992–1995); Miami Dolphins (1996)*; Dallas Cowboys (1996); New York Jets (1999)*; New Orleans Saints (2001); Jacksonville Jaguars (2003)*; Toronto Argonauts (2004)
- * Offseason or practice squad member only

Awards and highlights
- PFWA All-Rookie Team (1992); Grey Cup champion (2004); Third-team All-American (1991); Big Eight Freshman of the Year (1990); 2× First-team All-Big Eight (1990, 1991)

Career NFL statistics
- Receptions: 159
- Receiving yards: 2,103
- Receiving touchdowns: 16
- Stats at Pro Football Reference

Johnny Mitchell Jr. (born January 20, 1971) is an American former professional football player who was a tight end in the National Football League (NFL) for the New York Jets, Dallas Cowboys and New Orleans Saints. He played college football for the Nebraska Cornhuskers.

== Early life ==
Mitchell was raised by his grandparents on a 150-acre farm in Tchula, Mississippi, avoiding the difficult neighborhood in Chicago where his parents lived. He returned to Chicago at age 16 to pursue his education and sports.

Mitchell graduated from Simeon Career Academy (then known as Simeon Vocational High School) in 1989, where he played multiple positions, including quarterback and defensive end.

As a sophomore, he was a member of the state championship team. As a senior, he helped his team reach the city finals and received all-state honors.

== College career ==
Although he had initially agreed to attended the University of Miami, after head coach Jimmy Johnson left to coach the Dallas Cowboys of the NFL, Mitchell accepted a football scholarship from the University of Nebraska–Lincoln.

Mitchell became the first freshman from Nebraska to make the All-Big Eight first team since 1946. He was second on the team in receiving while setting a school record with 25.6 average yards per reception and tying the school record for touchdown receptions by a tight end in a season (seven). He also set a school bowl record when he recorded five receptions for 138 yards and one touchdown against Georgia Tech in the 1991 Florida Citrus Bowl.

In 1991, Mitchell set school records for tight ends when he recorded a team-leading 31 receptions for 534 yards and five touchdowns. He also set two school single-game records for receptions and yards by a tight end in the season finale against the University of Oklahoma when he had seven catches for 137 yards.

Mitchell declared himself eligible for the NFL draft after his sophomore season in order to help ease the financial burdens of his family. He became the first Nebraska player to leave school for the NFL before his eligibility had expired. He finished his college career with 42 receptions for 816 yards, a 19.4-yard average and 12 touchdowns.

== Professional career ==
=== New York Jets (first stint) ===
Mitchell was selected by the New York Jets in the first round (15th overall) of the 1992 NFL draft after improving his draft stock through his athletic performance at the NFL Scouting Combine, even though he was seen as a raw player. As a rookie, he had difficulty adapting to the professional game and registered only 16 receptions for 210 yards and one touchdown. He suffered a shoulder injury and was placed on the injured reserve list from games 2 through 6.

In 1993, Mitchell was among the league's leaders for tight ends with 39 receptions (fourth on the team) for 630 yards (third on the team) and six touchdowns. He had seven receptions for 146 yards and three touchdowns against the Philadelphia Eagles. He was declared inactive in two games because of a knee injury.

In 1994, Mitchell's best season came under head coach Pete Carroll when he was second on the team with 58 receptions for 749 yards and four touchdowns. He had 11 receptions for 120 yards against the Minnesota Vikings. He recorded five receptions for 81 yards and two touchdowns against the Miami Dolphins.

In 1995 with new head coach Rich Kotite, the Jets selected tight end Kyle Brady with the team's first selection in the 1995 NFL draft. Mitchell's reception count dropped to 45 (third on the team) for 497 yards (second on the team) and five touchdowns after missing four games with a back injury. He registered nine receptions for 108 yards and one touchdown against the New England Patriots.

The Jets designated him as the team's franchise player before the 1996 season and tried to trade him, but released him on April 23.

=== Miami Dolphins ===
On July 17, 1996, Mitchell signed as a free agent with the Miami Dolphins, but he departed training camp after 12 days and announced his retirement at the age of 25 on July 29.

=== Dallas Cowboys ===
On November 21, 1996, the Dallas Cowboys convinced Mitchell to leave retirement and signed him for depth purposes after dealing with injuries to tight ends Jay Novacek and Eric Bjornson. Mitchell played in four games (one start), registering one reception for 17 yards. He was not signed after the season.

=== New York Jets (second stint) ===
In 1999, Mitchell asked head coach Bill Parcells for an opportunity to restart his career. He was signed to a free-agent contract on January 19 but lasted only one day in training camp, leaving in the middle of the night without telling anyone his intentions. He announced his retirement on July 31.

=== New Orleans Saints ===
On June 4, 2001, Mitchell signed with the New Orleans Saints after four years away from the game. On September 2, he was released after being passed on the depth chart by rookie Boo Williams. On December 26, he was signed again after Cam Cleeland was placed on the injured reserve list with an Achilles injury. He did not play in the final two games of the season and was released on August 20, 2002.

=== Jacksonville Jaguars ===
On April 14, 2003, Mitchell was signed as a free agent by the Jacksonville Jaguars, who were enduring a contract holdout by tight end Kyle Brady.

== NFL career statistics ==
Legend
**Bold**	Career high

Year	Team	Games		Receiving				
Year	Team	GP	GS	Rec	Yds	Avg	Lng	TD
1992	NYJ	11	3	16	210	13.1	37	1
1993	NYJ	14	**14**	39	630	16.2	**65**	**6**
1994	NYJ	**16**	**14**	**58**	**749**	12.9	55	4
1995	NYJ	12	11	45	497	11.0	43	5
1996	DAL	4	1	1	17	**17.0**	17	0
Career		57	43	159	2,103	13.2	65	16

== Personal life ==
Mitchell was a studio analyst for British television channel Sky Sports on its live NFL coverage, as well as for ESPN Brasil. He also served as the head coach for the Coritiba Crocodiles, and in the 2013 and 2014 seasons, he led the Crocodiles to the Brazilian national football championship. He also taught tee-ball to kindergarten and prekindergarten kids from the International School of Curitiba.

He now works part-time at Scarisbrick Hall School in England, teaching students the American sports of football and baseball.
