= Margaret Bullock (physiotherapist) =

American academic

Margaret Irene Bullock AM FTSE (née Roberts, 24 March 1933 – 1 January 2026) was an Australian professor in physiotherapy at the University of Queensland and pioneer in the field of ergonomics.

== Early life ==
Margaret Irene Roberts was born in Brisbane, Queensland on 24 March 1933. She attended Brisbane Girls Grammar School. Margaret enrolled in the University of Queensland in 1951, becoming one of the first two students to graduate with a B.App.Sc in physiotherapy and occupational therapy in 1955.

== Career ==
Bullock tutored in the Department of Physiotherapy at UQ from 1955 to 1957. She married engineer and UQ graduate Keith Bullock in 1957, and they moved to Boston, USA during his Fulbright Scholarship. Margaret Bullock, as she was now known, worked as a physiotherapist at Massachusetts General Hospital while her husband worked at Harvard University. They returned to Australia in 1960, where Margaret worked as a lecturer. She was also a physiotherapist with the Spastic Centre in Brisbane. Her two children were born during this period.

In the late 1960s, Bullock began research into the measurement of body movements, leading to an extensive study of physiotherapy practice and ergonomics of workspaces in vehicles and aircraft cockpits.

She took her PhD from UQ in 1973, the first person in the world to take it in physiotherapy. Following her graduation, she became Head of the Department of Physiotherapy at UQ, and retained this position until 1987. She was Deputy President and President of the UQ Academic Board from 1986 to 1990.

She became Australia's first professor of physiotherapy in 1978.

Bullock retired from the university in 1999, and she was granted emeritus Professor status. Her husband Keith Bullock died in 2015. She was a visiting professor at Harvard University, Tufts University, and in Sweden for a time.

Bullock died on 1 January 2026.

== Memberships and awards ==
- 1976– Member of the Australian Academy of Technological Sciences and Engineering
- 1991– Fellow of the Australian Academy of Technological Sciences and Engineering (FTSE)
- 1997 – Member of the Order of Australia (AM), "In recognition of service in the field of physiotherapy, particularly as a research leader, academic and administrator"
- 2001– Centenary Medal, "For service to Australian society in material technology and biotechnology"
- 2006 – Queensland Finalist for Senior Australian of the Year
- Member of Australian Physiotherapy Association
- President of the Ergonomics Society of Australia
- Chair, Australian Council for Physiotherapy Regulating Authorities
- Medal, Australian Ergonomic Society
- Medal, International Ergonomic Society
