= 1991 Gator Bowl (December) =

1991 Mazda Gator Bowl
Oklahoma Sooners	Virginia Cavaliers
(8–3)	(8–2–1)
Big Eight	ACC
48	14
Head coach: Gary Gibbs	Head coach: George Welsh
AP / Coaches; 20 / 20	AP / Coaches; 19 / 19
	1	2	3	4	Total
Oklahoma	7	27	14	0	48
Virginia	0	7	0	7	14
- Date: December 29, 1991
- Season: 1991
- Stadium: Gator Bowl Stadium
- Location: Jacksonville, Florida
- MVP: Cale Gundy (QB, Oklahoma) & Tyrone Davis (DB, Virginia)
- Favorite: Virginia by 1.5
- Referee: Joe Rider (Big East)
- Attendance: 62,003
- Payout: US$$2,000,000

United States TV coverage
- Network: TBS
- Announcers: Bob Neal and Tim Foley

The 1991 Gator Bowl was an American college football bowl game between Oklahoma Sooners and the Virginia Cavaliers played on December 29, 1991, at the Gator Bowl Stadium in Jacksonville, Florida. For sponsorship reasons, the game was officially known as the Mazda Gator Bowl.

Oklahoma represented the Big Eight Conference and Virginia represented the Atlantic Coast Conference (ACC) in the competition. The game was the final competition of the 1991 football season for each team and resulted in a 48–14 Oklahoma victory, even though spread bettors favored Virginia to win by 1.5 points.
