= Jay Leeuwenburg =

American football player (born 1969)

No. 58, 57
- Positions: Guard, center

Personal information
- Born: June 18, 1969 (age 57); St. Louis, Missouri, U.S.
- Listed height: 6 ft 1 in (1.85 m)
- Listed weight: 270 lb (122 kg)

Career information
- High school: Kirkwood (Kirkwood, Missouri)
- College: Colorado
- NFL draft: 1992: 9th round, 244th overall pick

Career history
- Kansas City Chiefs (1992)*; Chicago Bears (1992–1995); Indianapolis Colts (1996–1998); Cincinnati Bengals (1999); Washington Commanders (2000); Denver Broncos (2001)*
- * Offseason or practice squad member only

Awards and highlights
- National champion (1990); Unanimous All-American (1991); 2× First-team All-Big Eight (1990, 1991)

Career NFL statistics
- Games played: 137
- Games started: 108
- Fumble recoveries: 2
- Stats at Pro Football Reference

Jay Robert Leeuwenburg (born June 18, 1969) is an American former professional football player who was an offensive lineman in the National Football League (NFL) for the Kansas City Chiefs, Chicago Bears, Indianapolis Colts, Cincinnati Bengals, and the Washington Redskins. He played college football for the Colorado Buffaloes, earning unanimous All-American honors in 1991. He was selected in the ninth round of the 1992 NFL draft with the 244th overall pick.

Leeuwenberg was born in St. Louis, Missouri. At age twelve, he was diagnosed with type 1 diabetes. He coauthored the book Yes I Can! Yes You Can! with Denny Dressman, an autobiography that focuses on his struggles with diabetes and his journey to the NFL.

His father, Dick Leeuwenburg, also played in the NFL.
