= Keithen McCant =

American gridiron football player (born 1969)

No. 15, 10
- Position: Quarterback

Personal information
- Born: March 8, 1969 (age 57)
- Listed height: 6 ft 2 in (1.88 m)
- Listed weight: 205 lb (93 kg)

Career information
- High school: Grand Prairie (Grand Prairie, Texas)
- College: Nebraska (1987–1991)
- NFL draft: 1992: 12th round, 316th overall pick

Career history
- 1992: Cleveland Browns*
- 1993–1994: Winnipeg Blue Bombers
- 1995: BC Lions
- * Offseason or practice squad member only

Awards and highlights
- First-team All-Big Eight (1991)

Keithen McCant (born March 8, 1969) is an American former professional football player who was a quarterback for three seasons in the Canadian Football League (CFL) with the Winnipeg Blue Bombers and BC Lions. He played college football for the Nebraska Cornhuskers. He was selected by the Cleveland Browns of the National Football League (NFL) in the twelfth round of the 1992 NFL draft.

== Early life ==
Keithen McCant was born on March 8, 1969. He attended Grand Prairie High School in Grand Prairie, Texas.

== College career ==
McCant played college football for the Nebraska Cornhuskers of the University of Nebraska–Lincoln. He was redshirted in 1987. He did not play in any games in 1988 and was a member of the scout team. McCant threw one pass for an interception in 1989 while also rushing two times for 52 yards. During the 1990 season, he recorded two completions on three passing attempts for 32 yards and one interception, and six carries for 23 yards. He was beat out by Mickey Joseph for the starting job in 1991 but soon became the starter after Joseph was benched in the second quarter of the season opener. Overall in 1991, McCant completed 97 of 168 passes (57.7%) for 1,454 yards, 13 touchdowns, and eight interceptions while also rushing 117 times for 654 yards and seven touchdowns. His 57.7 completion percentage, 8.7 yards per passing attempt, and 146.5 passer rating were the highest in the Big Eight Conference that year. He earned Associated Press first-team All-Big Eight honors for the 1991 season.

== Professional career ==
McCant was selected by the Cleveland Browns in the 12th round, with the 316th overall pick, of the 1992 NFL draft. He was released by the Browns on August 4, 1992.

McCant signed with the Winnipeg Blue Bombers of the Canadian Football League (CFL) in March 1993. He dressed in seven games for the Blue Bombers during the 1993 season but did not record any statistics. He dressed in all 18 games, starting six, for Winnipeg during the 1994 season, completing 108 of 200 passes (54.0%) for 1,425 yards, 12 touchdowns, and 13 interceptions while also rushing for 121 yards. He made $30,000 during the 1994 season.

McCant was signed by the BC Lions of the CFL in February 1995. His contract was reportedly likely worth $60,000 to $70,000. He dressed in 13 games as the backup to Danny McManus in 1995, recording nine completions on 15 attempts (60.0%) for 83 yards. He was released on September 29, 1995.
