= Texas Senate Bill 12 =

2025 Texas law

Senate Bill 12

Texas Legislature
- Long title: Relating to parental rights in public education, to certain public school requirements and prohibitions regarding instruction, diversity, equity, and inclusion duties, and social transitioning, and to student clubs at public schools.
- Territorial extent: Texas
- Passed by: Texas Senate
- Passed: March 19, 2025
- Passed by: Texas House of Representatives
- Passed: May 25, 2025
- Signed by: Greg Abbott
- Signed: June 20, 2025
- Effective: September 1, 2025

Initiating chamber: Texas Senate
- Introduced by: Brandon Creighton

Summary
- Establishes new requirements for public schools regarding parental rights, including restrictions on instruction and support related to diversity, equity, inclusion, and gender identity, in addition to prohibiting student organizations focused on sexual orientation or gender identity and requiring parental consent for routine health services.
- Status: In force

Texas Senate Bill 12 (S.B. 12) is a 2025 law in the state of Texas that imposes restrictions on diversity, equity, and inclusion (DEI) initiatives in K–12 public and open-enrollment charter schools. The law prohibits instruction on sexual orientation and gender identity and bans student clubs “based on sexual orientation or gender identity.” Additional provisions include requiring parental consent before the provision of healthcare services to students and prohibiting teachers from promoting “social transitioning,” which includes referring to a student by a name or pronouns that differ from the student’s legal name or sex assigned at birth. It was passed during the 89th Texas Legislature by the Senate on March 19, 2025, and by the House on May 25, 2025, and signed into law by Governor Greg Abbott on June 20, 2025, taking effect on September 1, 2025.

Senate Bill 12 was authored by Senator Brandon Creighton and was introduced on February 24, 2025. Certain provisions of the bill are currently facing legal challenges from various civil rights groups, including the American Civil Liberties Union on the basis of the First Amendment, Fourteenth Amendment, and the Equal Access Act. Proponents and supporters of the bill dubbed S.B. 12 the "Parental Bill of Rights," while the ACLU has dubbed it the "Student Identity Censorship Law". Controversy related to S.B. 12 stems primarily from the intersection of LGBTQ rights with the bill, particularly the gender and sexuality club and social transitioning bans as well as the restriction on discussion of topics related to DEI, including sexuality and gender identity.

== Provisions ==
=== DEI ===
The provisions of S.B. 12 related to diversity, equity, and inclusion include the prohibition of both "instruction, guidance, activities, or programming regarding sexual orientation or gender identity" and the promotion of "social transitioning" intended for K-12 students, the barring of "student club[s] based on sexual orientation or gender identity," and the termination and prohibition of "policies, procedures, trainings, activities, or programs that reference race, color, ethnicity, gender identity, or sexual orientation" unless mandated by state or federal law.

=== Health services ===
Senate Bill 12 brings about additional provisions related to health services in K-12 public schools, including the requirement for parental consent in the school's provision of these services. Under the bill's requirements, parents must opt-in for physical and mental health services provided by their child's school, the only exception being if there is an emergency or threat to the student's life.

=== Other ===
Besides the restrictions and requirements relating to DEI and healthcare in a school setting, Senate Bill 12 imposes numerous other provisions. One of these provisions is the requirement for parental consent before a student is allowed to participate in a club.

== Reception ==
=== Support ===
Representative Pat Curry has expressed his support for the healthcare provisions of the bill, saying that "parents need to know" about the medical care their children receive at school. In support of the bill, Michael Aboud, chairman of the Republican Party in El Paso, stated that teachers are "not supposed to be controlling the parent-child relationship".

=== Opposition ===
Other than outright litigation, several individuals and entities. have notably expressed opposition to S.B. 12. Amber Perez, the executive director of the Borderland Rainbow Center, an LGBTQ community center in El Paso, said that "higher rates of anxiety, higher rates of depression, [and] higher rates of, more than likely, people dropping out as well" would be a direct result of the bill. Students Engaged in Advancing Texas (SEAT) Executive Director Cameron Samuels expressed their opposition to the bill, saying that S.B. 12 "isn’t about improving education — it’s about weaponizing it." An attorney on behalf of the ACLU, Brian Klosterboer, said that S.B. 12 is a "very sprawling law that does a whole number of things" and clarified that the organization's lawsuit "challenges four unconstitutional aspects of Senate Bill 12".

=== Confusion ===
The Assistant Superintendent of Socorro Independent School District, Enrique Herrera, said that aspects of S.B 12 relating to parental consent have contributed to "confusion around adjustments on forms or creation of new forms" to be sent out to parents and guardians. According to the Texas Education Agency, districts are required to provide easily accessible parental rights forms to parents at the beginning of the school year. Additionally, Section 27 of S.B. 12, which effectively bans GSAs from meeting in Texas public schools, has caused confusion as districts have interpreted the language in different ways, with some clubs being rendered completely dysfunctional and some clubs being allowed to function under various circumstances.

== Litigation ==
S.B. 12 is subject to ongoing litigation, including legal challenges brought by the American Civil Liberties Union and Transgender Law Center. The lawsuit GSA Network, et al. v. Morath, et al. targets multiple provisions of the bill, including some outlined in Sections 3, 6, 24, and 27 under the First and Fourteenth Amendments, as well as the Equal Access Act. The case was scheduled for a preliminary injunction hearing in the Southern District of Texas on December 1, 2025 (later moved to December 18, 2025), with district judge Charles R. Eskridge III presiding. The preliminary injunction was decided February 20, dismissing the Commissioner of Education and ruling in favor of GSA Network, thus granting the injunction to the three school districts named as defendants (Houston, Katy and Plano ISDs).

== See also ==
- Anti-LGBTQ curriculum laws in the United States
- Equal Access Act, a federal statute cited in lawsuits against S.B. 12
- Texas Senate Bill 10, another education bill enacted alongside S.B. 12
