= Derek Brown (running back) =

American football player (born 1971)

No. 24, 21, 20, 30
- Position: Running back

Personal information
- Born: April 15, 1971 (age 55); Banning, California, U.S.
- Listed height: 5 ft 9 in (1.75 m)
- Listed weight: 201 lb (91 kg)

Career information
- High school: Servite (Anaheim, California)
- College: Nebraska
- NFL draft: 1993: 4th round, 109th overall pick

Career history
- New Orleans Saints (1993–1997); San Francisco Demons (2001)

Awards and highlights
- Third-team All-American (1991); 2× First-team All-Big Eight (1991, 1992)

Career NFL statistics
- Rushing yards: 1,383
- Rushing average: 3.6
- Receptions: 108
- Receiving yards: 918
- Total touchdowns: 9
- Stats at Pro Football Reference

Derek Dernell Brown (born April 15, 1971) is an American former professional football player who was a running back for four seasons with the New Orleans Saints in the National Football League (NFL). He played college football for the Nebraska Cornhuskers, earning third-team All-American honors in 1991. He was selected by the Saints in the fourth round of the 1993 NFL draft with the 109th overall pick.

While at Servite High School in Anaheim, California, a school with other notable football alumni such as Steve Beuerlein, Turk Schonert, and Blaine Nye, Brown set the Orange County single season rushing record with a mark of over 3,000 yards.

Pre-draft measurables
Height	Weight	Arm length	Hand span	40-yard dash	10-yard split	20-yard split	20-yard shuttle	Vertical jump	Broad jump	Bench press
5 ft 9 in (1.75 m)	180 lb (82 kg)	30 7/8 in (0.78 m)	9 1/4 in (0.23 m)	4.63 s	1.64 s	2.69 s	3.91 s	38.0 in (0.97 m)	10 ft 7 in (3.23 m)	13 reps

During his NFL career with the Saints he amassed 1,383 yards on 388 carries and scored six touchdowns in 56 games. He also caught 108 passes for 918 yards and three touchdowns. During this span he managed to only fumble the ball five times and returned five kicks for 71 yards.

== Statistics ==
Brown's stats for the Nebraska Cornhuskers
	Rushing					Receiving				
YEAR	ATT	YDS	AVG	LNG	TD	NO.	YDS	AVG	LNG	TD
1990	59	375	6.4	59	5	5	79	15.8	23	1
1991	230	1,313	5.7	61	14	10	86	8.6	19	0
1992	169	1,011	6.0	44	4	13	148	11.4	22	0
Totals	458	2,699	5.9	61	23	28	313	11.2	23	1

Brown's stats in the NFL
	Rushing						Receiving				
YEAR	TEAM	ATT	YDS	AVG	LNG	TD	NO.	YDS	AVG	LNG	TD
1993	NOR	180	705	3.9	60	2	21	170	8.1	19	1
1994	NOR	146	489	3.3	16	3	44	428	9.7	37	1
1995	NOR	49	159	3.2	35	1	35	266	7.6	19	1
1996	NOR	13	30	2.3	12	0	8	54	6.8	18	0
Totals	—	388	1,383	3.6	60	6	108	918	8.5	37	3
