= Lamont Warren =

American football player (born 1973)

No. 21, 27, 25
- Position: Running back

Personal information
- Born: January 4, 1973 (age 53); Indianapolis, Indiana, U.S.
- Listed height: 5 ft 11 in (1.80 m)
- Listed weight: 202 lb (92 kg)

Career information
- High school: Susan Miller Dorsey (Los Angeles, California)
- College: Colorado
- NFL draft: 1994: 6th round, 164th overall pick

Career history
- Indianapolis Colts (1994–1998); New England Patriots (1999); Detroit Lions (2001–2002)

Awards and highlights
- 2× Second-team All-Big Eight (1991, 1993)

Career NFL statistics
- Rushing yards: 922
- Rushing average: 3.2
- Rushing touchdowns: 8
- Stats at Pro Football Reference

Lamont Allen Warren (born January 4, 1973) is an American former professional football player who was a running back in the National Football League (NFL). He played college football for the Colorado Buffaloes and was selected 164th overall in the sixth round of the 1994 NFL draft. He played in the NFL for eight seasons with the Indianapolis Colts, New England Patriots, and Detroit Lions.
