= 1994 New York Jets season =

1994 season of NFL team New York Jets

- Owner: Leon Hess
- Head coach: Pete Carroll
- Offensive coordinator: Ray Sherman
- Defensive coordinator: Greg Robinson
- Home stadium: The Meadowlands

Results
- Record: 6–10
- Division place: 5th AFC East
- Playoffs: Did not qualify
- Pro Bowlers: WR Rob Moore

The 1994 New York Jets season was the 35th season for the team and the 25th in the National Football League. It began with the Jets trying to improve upon their 8–8 record from 1993 under new head coach Pete Carroll. The franchise’s largest home crowd at that time, 75,606, watched the Jets play the Miami Dolphins for a share of first place in the AFC East. The Jets led, 24–6, in the third quarter before Dan Marino led a furious comeback, capped by the “fake spike” touchdown pass to Mark Ingram, for the Dolphins’ 28–24 win. The Jets finished the season with a record of 6–10, losing six of their last seven games to end the season, and Carroll was fired. Following a Week 12 win at the Minnesota Vikings, the Jets would lose 33 of their next 37 games.

== Offseason ==
After the 1993 season, the Jets fired head coach Bruce Coslet, who had coached the team for four years, and promoted defensive coordinator Pete Carroll to Jets head coach.

=== NFL draft ===
Round	Pick	Player	Position	School/Club Team
1	12	Aaron Glenn	Cornerback	Texas A&M
2	41	Ryan Yarborough	Wide Receiver	Wyoming
3	94	Lou Benfatti	Defensive Tackle	Penn State
4	117	Orlando Parker	Wide Receiver	Troy State
5	152	Horace Morris	Linebacker	Tennessee
6	173	Fred Lester	Running Back	Alabama A&M
7	208	Glenn Foley	Quarterback	Boston College

=== Undrafted free agents ===
1994 undrafted free agents of note
Player	Position	College
Kyle Adams	Guard	Syracuse
Alan Allen	Wide receiver	Idaho
Kyle Anderson	Linebacker	Nebraska
LaVar Ball	Defensive end	UCLA
Gary Beckford	Defensive back	Bowie State
Paul Burke	Tight end	Idaho
Lindsey Chapman	Running back	California
Jeff Cooke	Defensive tackle	East Carolina
Cecil Doggette	Defensive back	West Virginia
Chauncey Hogan	Wide receiver	Southern
David McCleod	Wide receiver	James Madison
Chico Nelson	Defensive back	Ohio State
Dan Schmidt	Center	Kansas
Paul Yatkowski	Defensive end	Tennessee

== Personnel ==
1994 New York Jets staff
Front office: Chairman of the board – Leon Hess; President – Steve Gutman; Vice president/general manager – Dick Steinberg; Assistant general manager – James Harris; Director of player personnel – Dick Haley; Director of pro personnel – Jim Royer; Assistant director of pro personnel – Pat Kirwan; Head coaches: Head coach – Pete Carroll; Offensive coaches: Offensive coordinator – Ray Sherman; Quarterbacks – Walt Harris; Running backs – Johnny Roland; Receivers – Richard Mann; Tight ends – Don Breaux; Offensive line – Larry Beightol; Offensive assistant – Sparky Woods	Defensive coaches: Defensive coordinator – Greg Robinson; Defensive line – Larry Coyer; Linebackers – Foge Fazio; Defensive backs – Ed Donatell; Defensive assistant – Steve Trimble; Special teams coaches: Special teams – Brad Seely; Strength and conditioning: Strength and conditioning – Greg Mackrides

== Roster ==
1994 New York Jets roster
Quarterbacks (QB): 7 Boomer Esiason; 14 Glenn Foley; 10 Jack Trudeau; Running backs (RB): 20 Richie Anderson; 30 Brad Baxter FB; 32 Anthony Johnson; 39 Johnny Johnson; 35 Fred Lester; 29 Adrian Murrell; Wide receivers (WR): 88 Stevie Anderson; 81 Art Monk; 85 Rob Moore; 89 Orlando Parker; 87 Ryan Yarborough; Tight ends (TE): 84 Fred Baxter; 86 Johnny Mitchell; 80 James Thornton	Offensive linemen (OL): 76 James Brown T; 69 Jeff Criswell T; 52 Cal Dixon C; 62 Roger Duffy; 75 Siupeli Malamala T; 74 Everett McIver G; 53 Jim Sweeney C; 67 Dwayne White G; 77 Matt Willig G/T; 72 Terrence Wisdom G; Defensive linemen (DL): 78 Lou Benfatti DT; 92 Tony Casillas DT; 66 Donald Evans DT; 91 Paul Frase DE/DT; 56 Jeff Lageman DE; 95 Alfred Oglesby DE/DT; 71 Bill Pickel DT; 97 Marvin Washington DE	Linebackers (LB): 98 Kurt Barber OLB; 50 Glenn Cadrez OLB; 59 Kyle Clifton MLB; 55 Bobby Houston OLB; 54 Marvin Jones MLB; 57 Mo Lewis OLB; Defensive backs (DB): 31 Aaron Glenn CB; 21 Victor Green SS; 40 James Hasty CB; 25 Cliff Hicks CB; 42 Ronnie Lott FS; 37 Anthony Prior CB; 27 Pat Terrell FS; 22 Eric Thomas CB; 23 Marcus Turner CB; 48 Brian Washington SS; Special teams (ST): 11 Brian Hansen P; 8 Nick Lowery K	Practice squad: 51 Tuineau Alipate LB; 43 Chico Nelson S; 1 Tony Meola K; Reserve: 49 Troy Johnson LB (IR); Rookies in italics 53 active, 1 reserve, 3 practice squad

== Regular season ==
=== Schedule ===
Week	Date	Opponent	Result	Record	Venue	Attendance
1	September 4	at **Buffalo Bills**	**W** 23–3	1–0	Rich Stadium	79,460
2	September 11	Denver Broncos	**W** 25–22 (OT)	2–0	Giants Stadium	73,436
3	September 18	at **Miami Dolphins**	**L** 14–28	2–1	Joe Robbie Stadium	68,977
4	September 25	Chicago Bears	**L** 7–19	2–2	Giants Stadium	70,806
5	October 2	at Cleveland Browns	**L** 7–27	2–3	Cleveland Stadium	76,188
6	October 9	**Indianapolis Colts**	**W** 16–6	3–3	Giants Stadium	64,934
7	October 16	**New England Patriots**	**W** 24–17	4–3	Giants Stadium	71,123
8	Bye					
9	November 30	at **Indianapolis Colts**	**L** 25–28	4–4	RCA Dome	44,350
10	November 6	**Buffalo Bills**	**W** 22–17	5–4	Giants Stadium	66,949
11	November 13	at Green Bay Packers	**L** 10–17	5–5	Lambeau Field	58,307
12	November 20	at Minnesota Vikings	**W** 31–21	6–5	Hubert H. Humphrey Metrodome	60,687
13	November 27	**Miami Dolphins**	**L** 24–28	6–6	Giants Stadium	75,606
14	December 4	at **New England Patriots**	**L** 13–24	6–7	Foxboro Stadium	60,138
15	December 10	Detroit Lions	**L** 7–18	6–8	Giants Stadium	56,080
16	December 18	San Diego Chargers	**L** 6–21	6–9	Giants Stadium	48,213
17	December 24	at Houston Oilers	**L** 10–24	6–10	Astrodome	31,176
Note: Intra-divisional opponents are in bold text

=== Game summaries ===
==== Week 1 ====
Team	1	2	3	4	Total
• Jets	0	17	3	3	23
Bills	3	0	0	0	3

- Date: September 4
- Location: Rich Stadium, Orchard Park, New York
- Game start: 4:00 p.m.
- Game weather: 57 °F (13.9 °C), wind 8 miles per hour (13 km/h; 7.0 kn)
- Referee: Gerald Austin
- TV announcers (NBC): Marv Albert and Paul Maguire

Scoring summary
1	BUF	Steve Christie 27 yard field goal	Bills 3–0
2	NYJ	Richie Anderson 1 yard run (Nick Lowery kick)	Jets 7–3
2	NYJ	Johnny Johnson 9 yard run (Nick Lowery kick)	Jets 14–3
2	NYJ	Nick Lowery 27 yard field goal	Jets 17–3
3	NYJ	Nick Lowery 42 yard field goal	Jets 24–3
4	NYJ	Nick Lowery 22 yard field goal	Jets 27–3

==== Week 7 ====
Team	1	2	3	4	Total
Patriots	0	7	0	10	17
• Jets	7	14	0	3	24

- Date: October 16
- Location: Giants Stadium, East Rutherford, New Jersey
- Game start: 1:00 p.m.
- Game weather: 55 °F (12.8 °C); wind 16 miles per hour (26 km/h; 14 kn)
- Referee: Gerald Austin
- TV announcers (NBC): Charlie Jones and Randy Cross

Scoring summary
Q1	NYJ	Brad Baxter 1 yard run (Nick Lowery kick)	NYJ 7–0
Q2	NE	Ray Crittenden 3 yard pass from Drew Bledsoe (Matt Bahr kick)	Tie 7–7
Q2	NYJ	Brad Baxter 2 yard run (Nick Lowery kick)	NYJ 14–7
Q2	NYJ	Johnny Mitchell 4 yard pass from Boomer Esiason (Nick Lowery kick)	NYJ 21–7
Q4	NE	Blair Thomas 4 yard run (Matt Bahr kick)	NYJ 21–14
Q4	NYJ	Nick Lowery 37 yard field goal	NYJ 24–14
Q4	NE	Matt Bahr 40 yard field goal	NYJ 24–17

==== Week 13 vs Dolphins ====
Week Thirteen: Miami Dolphins (7–4) at New York Jets (6–5)

Quarter	1	2	3	4	Total
**Dolphins**	0	0	14	14	**28**
Jets	3	7	14	0	**24**

at Giants Stadium, East Rutherford, New Jersey

- Date: November 27, 1994
- Game time: 1:00 p.m. EDT
- Game weather: 33 °F (0.6 °C)
- Game attendance: 75,606
- Referee: Gary Lane
- TV announcers (NBC): Marv Albert and Paul Maguire
- Box Score, Box Score

Team	Category	Player	Statistics
Dolphins	Passing	Dan Marino	31/44, 359 Yds, 4 TD, 2 INT
Dolphins	Rushing	Bernie Parmalee	8 Rush, 23 Yds
Dolphins	Receiving	Mark Ingram	9 Rec, 117 Yds, 4 TD
Jets	Passing	Boomer Esiason	26/41, 382 Yds, 2 TD, 3 INT
Jets	Rushing	Brad Baxter	12 Rush, 41 Yds, TD
Jets	Receiving	Rob Moore	7 Rec, 124 Yds

Scoring summary

Quarter	Time	Drive			Team	Scoring information	Score	
Quarter	Time	Plays	Yards	TOP	Team	Scoring information	MIA	NYJ
1	3:46				Jets	24-yard field goal by Nick Lowery	0	3
2	6:48				Jets	Johnny Mitchell 20-yard touchdown reception from Boomer Esiason, Nick Lowery kick good	0	10
3	12:58				Jets	Brad Baxter 3-yard touchdown run, Nick Lowery kick good	0	17
3	8:41				Dolphins	Mark Ingram 10-yard touchdown reception from Dan Marino, 2-point pass failed	6	17
3	3:39				Jets	Johnny Mitchell 14-yard touchdown reception from Boomer Esiason, Nick Lowery kick good	6	24
3	0:42				Dolphins	Mark Ingram 17-yard touchdown reception from Dan Marino, 2-point pass good	14	24
4	10:13				Dolphins	Mark Ingram 28-yard touchdown reception from Dan Marino, Pete Stoyanovich kick good	21	24
4	0:22				Dolphins	Mark Ingram 8-yard touchdown reception from Dan Marino, Pete Stoyanovich kick good	28	24
"TOP" = time of possession. For other American football terms, see Glossary of American football.							28	24

=== Standings ===
AFC East
	W	L	T	PCT	PF	PA	STK
^{(3)} Miami Dolphins	10	6	0	.625	389	327	W1
^{(5)} New England Patriots	10	6	0	.625	351	312	W7
Indianapolis Colts	8	8	0	.500	307	320	W2
Buffalo Bills	7	9	0	.438	340	356	L3
New York Jets	6	10	0	.375	264	320	L5

== Turning point ==
In Week 13, the Jets were 6–5 and were still in the hunt for a playoff berth (a win would have created a first-place tie in the AFC East) as they faced the Dolphins. With the Jets leading 24–21 late in the game, Dolphin quarterback Dan Marino was ready to spike the ball to stop the clock, but instead he tricked the Jets defense by tossing for a game-winning touchdown and a Dolphin win. The Jets never recovered as they lost the remaining four games of the season and Pete Carroll, who called the loss "a staggering defeat", subsequently lost his job as Jets head coach. This game began a nosedive for the team that spanned the remaining two seasons, as between the end of the 1994 season and the close of the 1996 NFL season; the Jets won only 4 of their next 36 games following the "fake spike".
