= Aaron Rodgers =

American football player (born 1983)

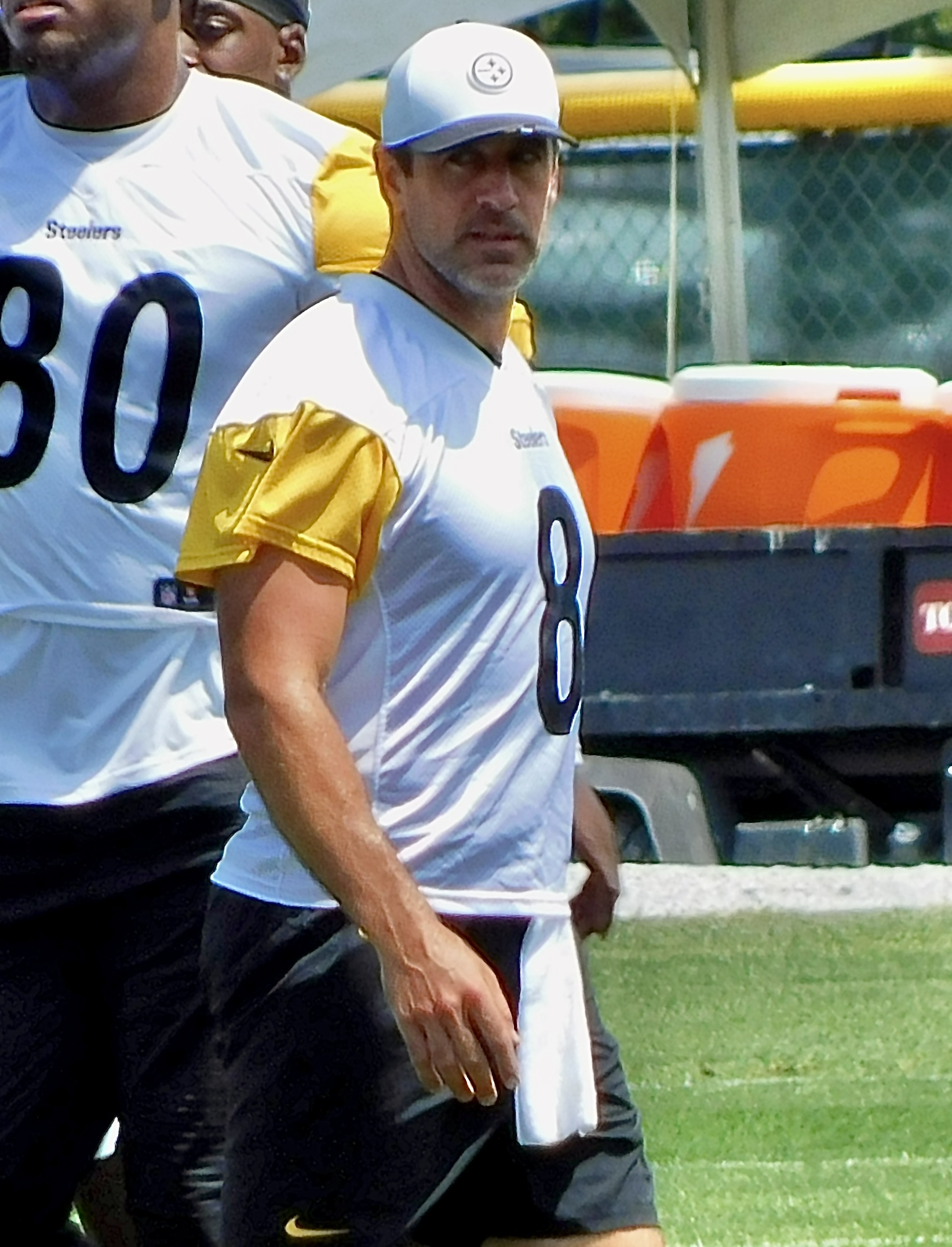
- Rodgers with the Pittsburgh Steelers in 2025

No. 8 – Pittsburgh Steelers
- Position: Quarterback
- Roster status: Active

Personal information
- Born: December 2, 1983 (age 42); Chico, California, U.S.
- Listed height: 6 ft 2 in (1.88 m)
- Listed weight: 223 lb (101 kg)

Career information
- High school: Pleasant Valley (Chico)
- College: Butte (2002); California (2003–2004)
- NFL draft: 2005: 1st round, 24th overall pick

Career history
- Green Bay Packers (2005–2022); New York Jets (2023–2024); Pittsburgh Steelers (2025–present)

Awards and highlights
- Super Bowl champion (XLV); Super Bowl MVP (XLV); 4× NFL Most Valuable Player (2011, 2014, 2020, 2021); 4× First-team All-Pro (2011, 2014, 2020, 2021); Second-team All-Pro (2012); 10× Pro Bowl (2009, 2011, 2012, 2014–2016, 2018–2021); 4× NFL passer rating leader (2011, 2012, 2020, 2021); 2× NFL passing touchdowns leader (2016, 2020); NFL completion percentage leader (2020); NFL 2010s All-Decade Team; Associated Press Athlete of the Year (2011); The Sporting News Athlete of the Year (2011); First-team All-Pac-10 (2004); NFL records: Career TD–INT ratio (minimum 1,500 attempts): 4.3-1; Lowest career interception percentage (minimum 1,500 attempts): 1.4%; Single season passer rating: 122.5 (2011); Lowest interception percentage in a season: 0.34% (2018); Most consecutive pass attempts without an interception: 402

Career NFL statistics as of Week 10, 2026
- Passing attempts: 9,060
- Passing completions: 5,886
- Completion percentage: 65.0%
- TD–INT: 542–129
- Passing yards: 68,288
- Passer rating: 101.6
- Rushing yards: 3,656
- Rushing touchdowns: 36
- Stats at Pro Football Reference

Aaron Charles Rodgers (born December 2, 1983) is an American professional football quarterback for the Pittsburgh Steelers of the National Football League (NFL). He played college football for the California Golden Bears, setting the school's record for lowest single-season and career interception rates before being selected by the Green Bay Packers in the first round of the 2005 NFL draft. After backing up Brett Favre for the first three years of his NFL career, Rodgers became the Packers' starting quarterback in 2008. In the 2010 season, he led them to a victory in Super Bowl XLV, earning the Super Bowl MVP. He was named Associated Press Athlete of the Year in 2011, was voted league MVP by the Associated Press for the 2011, 2014, 2020, and 2021 NFL seasons and is a four-time winner of the Best NFL Player ESPY Award. Rodgers is regarded as one of the greatest and most talented quarterbacks of all time.

Rodgers is the fifth player to win NFL MVP in consecutive seasons, joining Peyton Manning, Favre, Joe Montana and Jim Brown. Rodgers has led the NFL six times in touchdown-to-interception ratio (2011, 2012, 2014, 2018, 2020, 2021); six times in lowest passing interception percentage (2009, 2014, 2018, 2019, 2020, 2021); four times in passer rating (2011, 2012, 2020, 2021); four times in touchdown passing percentage (2011, 2012, 2020, 2021); three times in total touchdowns (2011, 2016, 2020); twice in touchdown passes (2016, 2020) and once in yards per attempt (2011) and completion percentage (2020).

Ranking second on the NFL's all-time regular-season career passer rating list with a rating of 102.10 (behind only Lamar Jackson's 102.37), Rodgers is among the most efficient quarterbacks of all time. Apart from a regular-season career passer rating of over 100 (the first to ever have a career rating over 100 (Note: While Rodgers was the first to have a career passer rating north of 100, three quarterbacks with at least 1,500 passing attempts have accomplished this feat since: Lamar Jackson (102.16), Joe Burrow (101.11), and Patrick Mahomes (100.75).)), he also holds the best touchdown-to-interception ratio and the lowest passing interception percentage in NFL history while also having had the highest passer rating in NFL history throughout the entire 2010s decade.

In the postseason, he is second in both touchdown passes and touchdown-to-interception ratio, fourth in passing yards, and eighth in all-time passer rating. In the regular season, he has the best touchdown-to-interception ratio in NFL history at 4.34, holds the league's second lowest career interception percentage at 1.4 percent and the highest single-season passer rating record of 122.5.

In 2023, Rodgers was traded to the New York Jets, where he spent two seasons with the team. Released by the Jets after the 2024 season, Rodgers signed with the Steelers, whom he led to a division title that season.

== Early life ==
Aaron Charles Rodgers was born on December 2, 1983, in Chico, California, the son of Darla Leigh (née Pittman) and Edward Wesley Rodgers. His father is a Texas-born chiropractor who played football as an offensive lineman for the Chico State Wildcats from 1973 to 1976. Rodgers is of English, Irish and German ancestry. The family moved to Ukiah, California, where he attended Oak Manor Elementary School. Edward Rodgers tossed a football with his sons Luke, Aaron and Jordan Rodgers, and told them not to drink and not to party in college or they would limit themselves in sports like he did. Aaron took this advice to heart. At the age of ten, he was featured on the front page of the Ukiah Daily Journal for his top performance at a local basketball free throw competition.

Later, the family moved to Beaverton, Oregon, where Rodgers attended Vose Elementary School and Whitford Middle School, and played baseball in the Raleigh Hills Little League at shortstop, center field and pitcher.

The Rodgers family returned to Chico in 1997, and Aaron attended Pleasant Valley High School, starting for two years at quarterback and garnering 4,421 passing yards. He set single-game records of six touchdowns and 440 all-purpose yards. Rodgers set a single-season school record with 2,466 total yards in 2001. He graduated from Pleasant Valley High School in spring 2002, after scoring 1310 in the SAT and with an A− average.

== College career ==
Despite his impressive high school record, Rodgers attracted little interest from Division I programs. In a 2011 interview with E:60, he attributed the relative lack of attention in the recruiting process to his unimposing physical stature as a high school player at 5 ft 10 in (1.78 m) and 165 pounds (75 kg). Rodgers wanted to attend Florida State and play under head coach Bobby Bowden, but was rejected. He was only offered an opportunity to compete for a scholarship as a walk-on from University of Illinois. He declined the invitation, and considered quitting football to play baseball instead or giving up entirely on the idea of playing in professional sports and attending law school after completing his undergraduate degree.

He was then recruited to play football at Butte College in Oroville, a junior college about 15 miles (24 km) southeast of Chico.

=== Butte ===
==== 2002 season ====
Rodgers threw 26 touchdowns in his freshman season at Butte, leading the school to a 10–1 record, the NorCal Conference championship, and a No. 2 national ranking. While there, he was discovered by the California Golden Bears' head coach Jeff Tedford, who was recruiting Butte tight end Garrett Cross. Tedford was surprised to learn that Rodgers had not been recruited earlier. Because of Rodgers' good high school scholastic record, he was eligible to transfer to the University of California, Berkeley after one year of junior college instead of the typical two.

=== California ===
==== 2003 season ====
As a junior college transfer, Rodgers had three years of eligibility at Cal. He was named the starting quarterback in the fifth game of the 2003 season, beating the only team that offered him a Division I opportunity out of high school, Illinois. As a sophomore, he helped lead the Golden Bears to a 7–3 record as a starter.

In his second career start, Rodgers led the team to a 21–7 halftime lead against #3 USC. Due to injury, Rodgers was replaced in the second half by Reggie Robertson. The Bears won in triple overtime, 34–31. Rodgers passed for 394 yards and was named game MVP in the Insight Bowl against Virginia Tech.

In 2003, Rodgers tied the school season record for 300-yard games with five and set a school record for the lowest percentage of passes intercepted at 1.43%.

==== 2004 season ====
As a junior, Rodgers led Cal to a 10–1 record and top-five ranking at the end of the regular season, with their only loss a 23–17 loss at No. 1 USC. In that game, Rodgers set a school record for consecutive completed passes with 26 and tied an NCAA record with 23 consecutive passes completed in one game. He set a Cal single-game record for passing completion percentage of 85.3. Rodgers holds the Cal career record for lowest percentage of passes intercepted at 1.95 percent. Rodgers' performance set up the Golden Bears at first and goal with 1:47 remaining and a chance for the game-winning touchdown. On the first play of USC's goal line stand, Rodgers threw an incomplete pass. This was followed by a second-down sack by Manuel Wright. After a timeout and Rodgers' incomplete pass on third down, USC stopped Cal's run play to win the game. Rodgers commented that it was "frustrating that we couldn't get the job done." Overall, he finished the 2004 season with 2,566 passing yards, 24 touchdowns, and eight interceptions. His 66.1% pass completion percentage led the Pac-10. He finished ninth in Heisman Trophy voting.

After Texas was picked over Cal for a Rose Bowl berth, the fourth-ranked Bears were awarded a spot in the Holiday Bowl, which they lost to Texas Tech, 45–31. After the season, Rodgers decided to forgo his senior season to enter the 2005 NFL draft.

== Professional career ==
=== 2005 NFL draft ===
Rodgers was expected to be selected early in the 2005 NFL draft as he had posted impressive numbers as a junior with Cal, throwing for 2,320 yards with a 67.5 completion rate in the regular season. He threw for 24 touchdowns and only eight interceptions in his last college season, impressing many NFL scouts. They commented that he was a "talented strong-armed junior" who "combines arm strength, mechanics and delivery to make all the throws", but noted that his stats could be inflated due to playing in a quarterback-friendly system and that he would need to adjust to the more elaborate defensive schemes of the NFL.

Pre-draft measurables
Height	Weight	Arm length	Hand span	40-yard dash	10-yard split	20-yard split	20-yard shuttle	Three-cone drill	Vertical jump	Broad jump	Wonderlic
6 ft 2 in (1.88 m)	223 lb (101 kg)	32 1/4 in (0.82 m)	10 1/8 in (0.26 m)	4.71 s	1.65 s	2.75 s	4.32 s	7.39 s	34.5 in (0.88 m)	9 ft 2 in (2.79 m)	35
All values are from NFL Combine, except short shuttle from Pro Day

Before the draft, Rodgers was confident that he would be drafted to the San Francisco 49ers, the team he supported and grew up near, who possessed the No. 1 overall pick in the draft. The 49ers, however, drafted quarterback Alex Smith out of Utah instead, and Rodgers slid all the way down to the 24th overall pick by the Green Bay Packers. Rodgers has said that he experienced much angst and restlessness when waiting to be selected several hours into the draft, as he had expected himself to be selected much sooner. Rodgers' slip to the 24th selection and the Packers choosing to pick Brett Favre's future replacement became one of the biggest stories of the draft, though he was still the second quarterback selected. His drop in the draft was later ranked number one on the NFL Network's Top 10 Draft Day Moments. Many teams drafting between the second and 23rd positions had positional needs more pressing than quarterback.

Rodgers is one of six quarterbacks coached by Jeff Tedford to be drafted in the first round of an NFL draft, joining Trent Dilfer, Akili Smith, David Carr, Joey Harrington and Kyle Boller.

=== Green Bay Packers ===
==== Backup years: 2005–2007 ====
In August 2005, Rodgers agreed to a reported five-year, $7.7 million deal that included $5.4 million in guaranteed money and had the potential to pay him as much as $24.5 million if all incentives and escalators were met.

Rodgers spent his rookie season as the Packers' backup quarterback behind Brett Favre. The Packers were 4–12 at this point and he received his first extended look in the opening preseason game against the San Diego Chargers after replacing Favre. In his first NFL game, Rodgers completed two out of seven passes and was sacked twice. He continued to struggle through the preseason, before ending the preseason by converting two third downs and throwing a touchdown pass to tight end Ben Steele against the Tennessee Titans. Once the regular season began, Rodgers saw very little action that year. He played against the New Orleans Saints in the fourth quarter of a 52–3 victory, and completed his first career pass to fullback Vonta Leach for 0 yards. On December 19, 2005, Rodgers entered the game against the Baltimore Ravens at the end of the third quarter in a 48–3 loss. He completed eight of 15 passes for 65 yards and an interception.

After the Packers' losing season, head coach Mike Sherman was fired and replaced by Mike McCarthy. Rodgers was then placed in McCarthy's "Quarterback school" for six hours a day several times a week. This focused on working on Rodgers' motor skills such as hand-eye coordination, finger dexterity, and mechanics. McCarthy also worked on Rodgers' release point, moving it from right beside the ear hole of his helmet to further below it, to give him a smoother release. When the 2006 preseason began, Rodgers played as the backup in all four games; he completed 22 out 38 passes for 323 yards and three touchdowns. Rodgers saw very little action during the 2006 season, but did step in briefly on October 2 against the Philadelphia Eagles when Favre left the game due to injury. On November 19, 2006, Rodgers broke his left foot while playing against the New England Patriots in a 35–0 defeat at home, filling in for an injured Favre, and Rodgers missed the remainder of the 2006 season.

Following the team's season-ending victory at Chicago, Favre announced that he would stay with the Packers for the 2007 season, again postponing Rodgers' hopes of becoming the Packers' starting quarterback. Prior to the 2007 season, rumors surfaced about a potential trade involving Rodgers in which he would be traded to the Oakland Raiders for wide receiver Randy Moss. However, Moss was traded to the Patriots during the second day of the 2007 NFL draft, and Rodgers stayed in Green Bay.

Rodgers stepped in when Favre was injured in the second quarter against the Dallas Cowboys on Thursday Night Football on November 29, 2007. Rodgers completed 18 passes for 201 yards, with no interceptions. He also threw his first touchdown pass but was sacked three times. Rodgers brought the team back from a 17-point deficit to a 3-point deficit, but the Cowboys went on to win 37–27.

==== 2008: Transition to starter ====
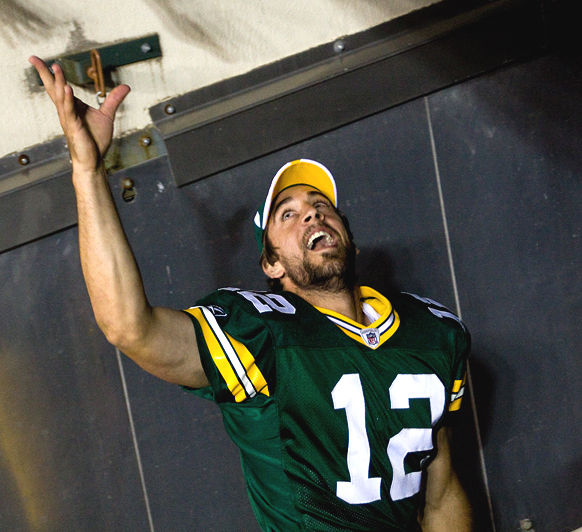
Rodgers going down the tunnel at Lambeau Field in 2008

Favre's retirement announcement on March 4, 2008, opened up the Packers' starting quarterback position to Rodgers for the 2008 season. Although Favre decided to return from retirement, he was traded to the New York Jets, which meant that Rodgers would become the starter.

Rodgers quickly proved that he was one of the best quarterbacks in the league by passing for 4,038 yards in his first season as a starter as well as throwing for 28 touchdowns and only 13 interceptions. As of the 2025 season, this still stands as the most interceptions he has thrown in a season. With Rodgers making his debut as a starter, the Packers beat the Minnesota Vikings 24–19 at Lambeau Field. This marked the first time since 1992 that a quarterback other than Favre started a regular season game for the Packers. Rodgers ended the game with 178 yards passing and two touchdowns (one passing and one rushing). In just his second NFL start the following week, Rodgers was voted the FedEx Air award winner after passing for 328 yards and three touchdowns in a win against the Lions.

During the fourth week of the season, Rodgers' streak of 157 consecutive pass attempts without an interception ended when he was intercepted by Derrick Brooks of the Tampa Bay Buccaneers. The streak was the third-longest in franchise history behind Bart Starr (294) and Brett Favre (163). Rodgers suffered a severe shoulder sprain in the game but continued to start and played well in a win against the Seattle Seahawks two weeks later. Despite early successes, Rodgers had been unable to win a close game during the season despite seven opportunities to do so.

On October 31, 2008, Rodgers signed a six-year, $65 million contract extension through the 2014 season. In Rodgers' first full season with the team, the Packers finished with a 6–10 record and missed the playoffs.

==== 2009 ====
For the opening game of the 2009 season, Rodgers recorded his first win in a comeback situation. The Packers were trailing at the beginning of the fourth quarter when Rodgers completed a fifty-yard touchdown pass to wide receiver Greg Jennings with about a minute remaining in the game to contribute to the 21–15 victory over the Chicago Bears.

Rodgers was named NFC Offensive Player of the Month for October 2009, when he passed for 988 yards, completed 74.5 percent of his passes, and recorded a passer rating over 110 for all three games played during the month.

After a 4–4 start to the season and a 38–28 loss to the previously winless Buccaneers, the team began to heat up. Rodgers led the Packers to five straight wins, in which he threw for a total of 1,324 yards, nine touchdowns, and two interceptions. Rodgers and the Packers won two of their last three games, finishing the second half of the season with a 7–1 record and an overall 11–5 record; good enough to secure a wild card playoff berth and clinch the fifth seed in the playoffs.

The Packers set a new franchise record by scoring 461 total points (third in the league), breaking the previous record held by the 1996 Super Bowl team (456). Rodgers became the first quarterback in NFL history ever to throw for 4,000 yards in both of his first two years as a starter. He finished the season fourth in passing yards (4,434), touchdown passes (30), passer rating (103.2), and yards per attempt (8.2) as well as eighth in completion percentage (64.7%), while also coming second among quarterbacks in rushing yards (316). His passing yardage made him second all-time in Packers history, behind only Lynn Dickey's all-time single-season record. His passer rating of 103.2 was also third-highest in team history at the time, behind only Bart Starr's 105.0 rating in 1966 and 104.3 rating in 1968 (minimum 150 attempts).

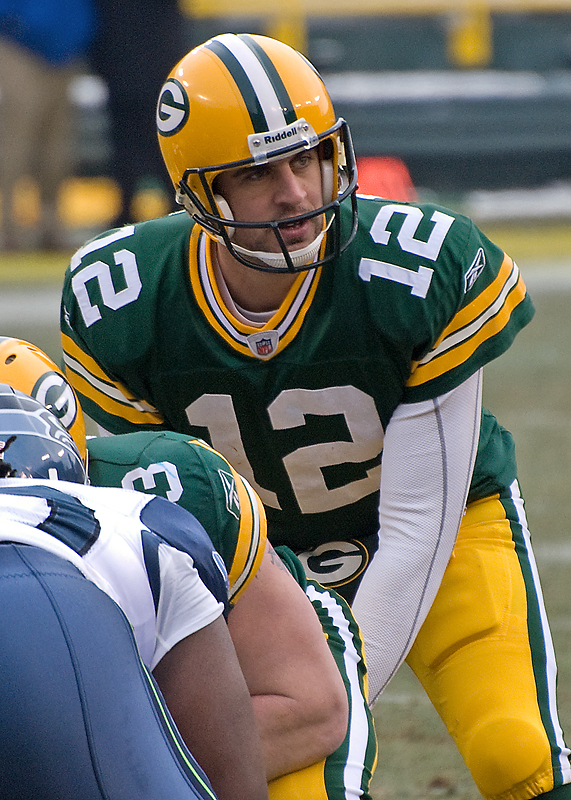
Rodgers in 2009, before a snap

In the Wild Card Round, the Packers played the Arizona Cardinals, the same team they had previously beaten the week before, 33–7. Rodgers and Cardinals quarterback Kurt Warner put on a show that later ranked second on NFL Network's Top 10 Quarterback Duels. Rodgers' first pass was intercepted by Dominique Rodgers-Cromartie. Rodgers settled down after that miscue, however, and finished the game completing 28 of 42 passes for 423 yards, with four touchdown passes all in a second-half comeback. His 423 passing yards are the most by any quarterback in his first playoff game as well as his four touchdown passes and five total touchdowns. Warner shredded the Packers' second-ranked defense, completing 29 of 33 passes for 379 yards, five touchdowns, no interceptions, and a passer rating of 154.1. Despite Rodgers' offensive efforts, the Packers lost the game when he fumbled on a controversial play in overtime. The ball was returned by Karlos Dansby for the winning touchdown in the 51–45 Cardinals victory. It was the highest scoring playoff game in NFL history.

Due to his regular season performance, Rodgers earned a trip to his first Pro Bowl as the NFC's third quarterback, behind Drew Brees and Brett Favre. However, after Favre dropped out due to injury and Brees was replaced due to his participation in Super Bowl XLIV, Rodgers became the NFC's starter.

==== 2010: Super Bowl XLV season ====
In 2010, Rodgers led the Packers to a 2–0 start, but then lost three of their next four games, including back-to-back overtime losses. The two overtime defeats brought Rodgers' record in overtime games to 0–5.

At midseason, Rodgers had already thrown nine interceptions compared to only throwing seven all of the previous season, and was 16th in the league with an 85.3 passer rating. Over the remainder of the regular season, however, his play improved as he threw 16 touchdowns to only two interceptions, completed 71.4% of his passes, and had a passer rating of 122.0.

In Week 13, in a 34–16 victory over the San Francisco 49ers, Rodgers had 298 passing yards and three touchdowns to earn his first career NFC Offensive Player of the Week honor. In Week 14, he sustained his second concussion of the season. Backup Matt Flynn was put into the game as Rodgers' replacement. The Packers lost the game 7–3 to the Lions. Against the Patriots, Rodgers missed the next week's regular season start, ending his streak of consecutive starts at 45, which is tied for the second longest in team history.

After their road loss to the Patriots, the Packers found themselves at 8–6 and had to win their final two regular season games to qualify for the playoffs. Rodgers turned around the team's performance; they won their final two regular season games, one of them against the New York Giants, where Rodgers completed 25 of 37 passes for 404 yards, with four touchdown passes, and with a passer rating of 139.9. It was his first regular season 400-yard passing game. For his effort against the Giants, he earned his second NFC Offensive Player of the Week honor for the 2010 season. In the next game, they defeated the Bears by a score of 10–3 in the regular season finale.

Rodgers was named the FedEx Air NFL Player of the Year for his passing performance in the 2010 season.

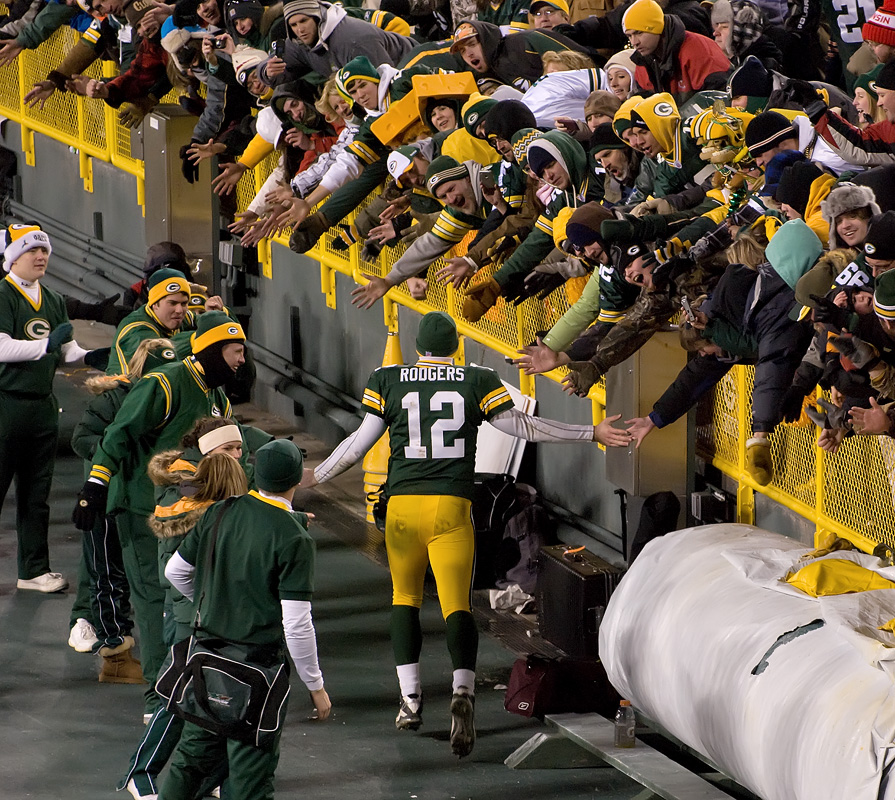
Rodgers greeting the fans in Lambeau Field during the 2010 season's finale against the Bears

With a 10–6 record, the Packers entered the playoffs as a Wild Card and the No. 6 seed. In the Wild Card Round, they defeated the No. 3 seeded Eagles 21–16. In the Divisional Round, Rodgers completed 31 of 36 pass attempts for 366 yards and four touchdowns in a 48–21 blowout victory over the No. 1 seeded Atlanta Falcons. It was the most points scored in Packers postseason history. During the contest, Rodgers tied an NFL record for consecutive playoff games with at least three touchdown passes (3 games). Rodgers also set an NFL record by becoming the only quarterback to pass for ten touchdowns combined through three consecutive playoff games. On January 23, 2011, Rodgers had a 55.4 passer rating as the Packers beat the No. 2 seed Chicago Bears 21–14 win in the NFC Championship.

After winning the NFC Championship, the Packers earned a trip to Super Bowl XLV against the Pittsburgh Steelers. In the game, Rodgers completed 24 of 39 pass attempts for 304 yards and three touchdowns in the 31–25 win, and was named Super Bowl MVP for his performance. This would ultimately be his only Super Bowl appearance with the Packers.

From his playoff performance, Rodgers became only the third player in NFL history to pass for over 1,000 yards in a single postseason and also became one of only four quarterbacks to record over 300 yards passing, with at least three touchdown passes, and no interceptions in a Super Bowl. He finished with 1,094 passing yards, nine touchdown passes, two rushing touchdowns, and two interceptions, while completing 68.2% of his passes for a passer rating of 109.8. From this postseason, Rodgers also became the only player to pass for at least 900 yards and rush for at least two touchdowns in a single postseason. He was ranked 11th by his fellow players on the NFL Top 100 Players of 2011.

==== 2011: First MVP ====
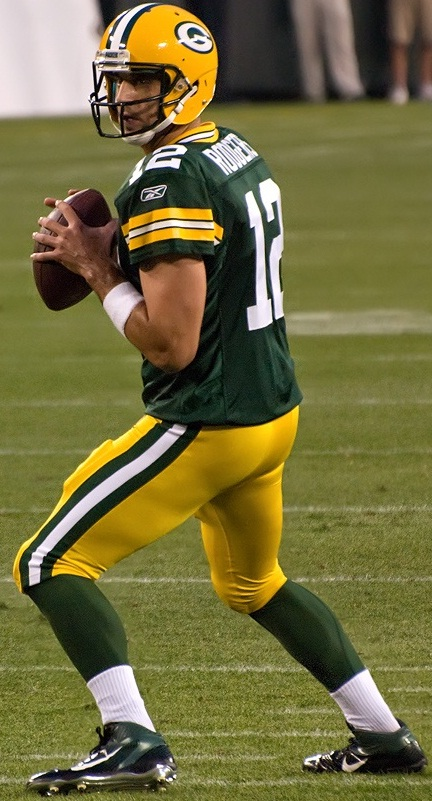
Rodgers drops back for a pass in 2011.

Because of the 2011 NFL lockout, the Packers and Rodgers did not schedule unofficial off-season workouts, despite many teams doing so. Rodgers and the Packers quickly quelled any concerns over their readiness by defeating the Saints, who had scheduled off-season workouts, 42–34. He had 312 passing yards and three touchdowns to earn NFC Offensive Player of the Week. After the game, Rodgers said in the press conference, "I was going to ask myself, what would have happened if we had offseason workouts? I mean, could we have started any faster and scored more points tonight?"

In Week 4, a 49–23 victory over the Denver Broncos, Rodgers had 408 passing yards, four touchdowns, and one interception and ran for two touchdowns to earn another NFC Offensive Player of the Week honor. In Week 6, a 24–3 victory over the St. Louis Rams, Rodgers converted on a career-high 93-yard touchdown pass to Jordy Nelson. In Week 9, a 45–38 victory over the Chargers, he had 247 passing yards and four touchdowns to earn his third NFC Offensive Player of the Week honor for the 2011 season. Rodgers and the Packers got off to a 13–0 start in 2011, tying the NFC record for most consecutive wins to start a season, but were upset by the Kansas City Chiefs 19–14 in week 15, ending their winning streak at 19 games, the second-longest winning streak in NFL history.

Rodgers finished the season with 4,643 passing yards, 45 touchdown passes, and six interceptions, good for a passer rating of 122.5, which as of 2024 is the highest single-season passer rating in NFL history. His passing yards, touchdown passes, and passer rating set single-season franchise records. In addition to passer rating, Rodgers led the league in touchdown to interception ratio (7.5, fourth-best all-time), touchdowns passing % (9.0%, second highest all-time), and yards per attempt (9.2, fourth-highest all-time since becoming an official stat in 1970), while finishing second in both touchdown passes (45, sixth-highest all-time) and completion percentage (68.3%), as well as fifth in passing yards. He earned NFC Offensive Player of the Month awards for September, October, and November, and FedEx Air Player of the Week six times (Weeks 4, 5, 6, 7, 9, and 13). In week four, against the Denver Broncos, Rodgers became the only quarterback in NFL history to record over 400 passing yards with four touchdown passes, while also rushing for two touchdowns in the same game. He was the winner of the 2011 Galloping gobbler as MVP of the Thanksgiving game between the Packers and the Lions, a 27–15 Green Bay victory, and tied an NFL record for consecutive games with at least two touchdown passes (13).

The Packers became the fifth team in NFL history to finish the regular season with a 15–1 record. Rodgers played in 15 of the 16 games, with the only exception being Week 17 against the Lions, a game in which Rodgers was rested after the club clinched home-field advantage for the playoffs the previous week. In the game, Rodgers assisted backup quarterback Matt Flynn in his stellar 480-yard, six-touchdown performance by helping call some plays. The Packers' offense set franchise record for points scored in a season with 560, which as of 2016 is the third-most ever behind only the 2007 Patriots and 2013 Broncos.

Rodgers set numerous NFL records in 2011. He recorded a passer rating of over 100.0 in thirteen games during the season, including twelve games in a row (both records), and a passer rating of 110.0 or higher in twelve games, including eleven in a row (also records). Rodgers also won the league's MVP award, receiving 48 of the 50 votes (the other two going to Drew Brees). He also finished second, behind Brees, for the AP Offensive Player of the Year award. Rodgers' 2011 season was later ranked as the third greatest passing season of all time by ESPN in 2013, and was regarded as the most efficient.

The Packers were upset by the eventual Super Bowl champion New York Giants in the Divisional Round by the score of 37–20. The Packers' receiving corps dropped six passes in the loss and Rodgers finished the game with 264 passing yards, two touchdown passes, and an interception on his last pass attempt. The 2011 Packers became the only team in NFL history to go 15–1 and not win a playoff game, as well as being the fourth consecutive team to win at least 15 games and not win the Super Bowl. Rodgers was named to the Pro Bowl for his 2011 season to go along with a First-team All-Pro honor. He was voted by his fellow players as the best player in the league on the NFL Top 100 Players of 2012.

==== 2012 ====
Rodgers and the Packers started off the 2012 season with a 30–22 loss to the 49ers. With the loss, Rodgers lost his bet with the music group Boyz II Men, and had to wear an Alex Smith jersey during the next week of practice. Had the Packers won the game, Boyz II Men would have sung the national anthem during their next home game at Lambeau.

In Week 4, a 28–27 victory over the Saints, Rodgers had 319 passing yards, four touchdowns, and one interception to earn NFC Offensive Player of the Week. In Week 6, against the undefeated Houston Texans, he tied the franchise record by throwing six touchdown passes, in a 42–24 victory, to earn NFC Offensive Player of the Week. The Texans had allowed only six total touchdown passes during the season up to that point. This sparked a five-game winning streak which Rodgers completed 65.7% of his passes for 1,320 yards, 17 touchdowns, two interceptions, and a passer rating of 119.1. During that stretch, Rodgers was named NFC Offensive Player of the Month for October. In Week 15, Rodgers threw for 291 yards and three touchdowns to lead the Packers past the Bears, 21–13, making them NFC North champions for the second consecutive year. In the season finale, despite Rodgers going 28 of 40 for 365 yards, four touchdowns, no interceptions and a passer rating of 131.8, the Packers lost 37–34 against the Vikings. This ended the Packers' twelve-game winning streak against NFC North opponents.

The Packers finished with an 11–5 record, first in the NFC North, and clinched the #3-seed in the NFC playoffs. Rodgers led the league for the second straight year in passer rating (108.0) touchdowns passing % (7.1%), and touchdown-to-interception ratio (4.875), while finishing second in touchdown passes (39), third in completion percentage (67.2%), fifth in yards per attempt (7.78), and eighth in passing yards (4,295).

In the playoffs, the Packers defeated the Minnesota Vikings 24–10 in the Wild Card Round. Rodgers completed 23 of 33 passes to ten different players for 274 yards and a touchdown. They were beaten 45–31 by the 49ers in the Divisional Round. Rodgers completed 26 of 39 passes for 257 yards, two touchdowns, and an interception, while also rushing for 28 yards, in the losing effort. He earned his third career Pro Bowl nomination for his performance in the 2012 season. He was ranked sixth by his peers on the NFL Top 100 Players of 2013.

==== 2013 ====
On April 26, 2013, the Packers and Rodgers agreed to a 5-year, $110 million contract extension making him the highest paid player in NFL history. The Packers began their 2013 season against the reigning NFC champions, the 49ers, the team that also ended their playoff run the previous season. Rodgers went 21 for 37 in completions, 333 yards, three touchdowns and an interception in the 34–28 loss. The following week, Rodgers had a career-high 480 passing yards to tie the franchise record in the 38–20 home-opener win against the Washington Redskins. He earned NFC Offensive Player of the Week for his effort against the Redskins. His 335 passing yards in the first half set a club record. He also became the first quarterback since Y. A. Tittle in 1962 to throw for at least 480 yards, four touchdowns and no interceptions in a game. The following week, Rodgers saw his NFL record of 41 consecutive games without throwing multiple interceptions come to an end in a loss to the Cincinnati Bengals by the score of 34–30.

After the loss to the Bengals, the Packers started rolling, winning their next four games. Against the Ravens, the Packers lost two receivers: Randall Cobb and James Jones. Cobb was sidelined with a broken leg and Jones with a sprained PCL. Against the Cleveland Browns, tight end Jermichael Finley was carted off the field with a bruised spinal cord, leaving Rodgers without three of his top four offensive weapons. The next week against the Vikings, Rodgers completed 24 of 29 passes in a 44–31 victory.

At home against the Bears in Week 9, Rodgers was sacked by Shea McClellin. He fractured his left clavicle in the process, and the speculation for his return ranged from a few weeks to an indefinite timetable that became a weekly spectacle of whether or when he might be cleared to play again. Before Rodgers had broken his collarbone, the Packers had won four straight games to climb to the top of the NFC North division with a 5–2 record. With Rodgers injured and unable to play, the Packers went winless over the next five weeks to fall to 5–6–1 on the season.

After rallying in December behind re-acquired backup quarterback Matt Flynn, the Packers had fought their way back to a 7–7–1 record going into the final week of the season. On December 26, Packers head coach Mike McCarthy announced Rodgers would return and start in the season-finale showdown against the Chicago Bears at Soldier Field for the NFC North championship. Returning from the injury, Rodgers threw for 318 yards, two touchdowns, and two interceptions in the regular season finale against the Bears. Trailing 27–28 with under a minute to go in the game and facing the third 4th down of the drive, a 4th & 8 from the 48-yard line, Rodgers connected with Cobb, who was also returning for his first game since breaking his leg in Week 6, for a 48-yard game-winning touchdown to clinch the NFC North and earn the right to host a home playoff game against the San Francisco 49ers as the fourth seed. Rodgers won the 2013 GMC Never Say Never Award for the come-from-behind, division-winning touchdown pass. Rodgers finished fifth in the league in passer rating (104.9), completion percentage (66.6%), and yards per game (282) while also finishing second in yards per attempt (8.75).

Rodgers led the Packers to the playoffs again, this time with an 8–7–1 record and were up against the team that eliminated them last year in the Divisional Round of the playoffs, the 49ers. The Packers lost to the 49ers for the fourth consecutive time, 23–20 on a last second field goal at Lambeau Field, in the Wild Card Round. Rodgers recorded only 177 yards passing, his lowest in a playoff game, and one touchdown pass. He was ranked No. 11 by his fellow players on the NFL Top 100 Players of 2014.

==== 2014: Second MVP ====
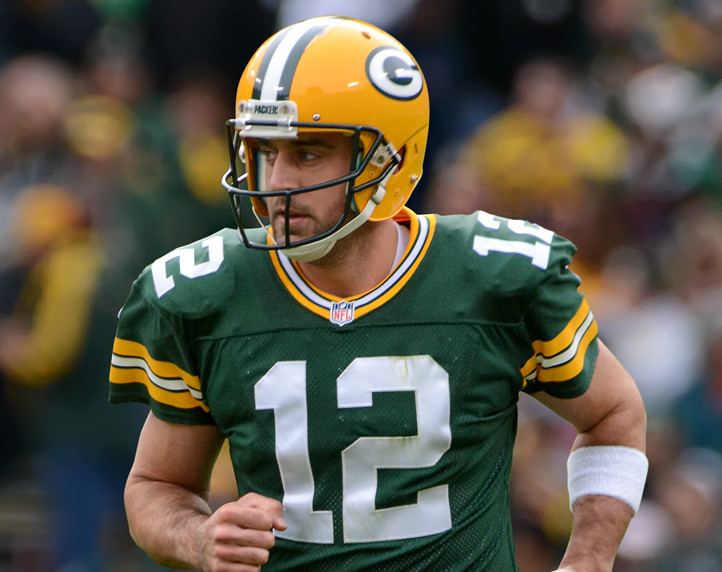
Rodgers in 2014

The Packers' 2014 regular season debut came against the defending Super Bowl champion Seahawks—a game in which they would go on to lose 36–16. In Week 2, the team began the game with a 21–3 deficit against the Jets, but came back and won 31–24. The 18-point comeback marked the biggest comeback in Rodgers' career. In the third week of the season, the Packers offense was shut down by the Lions' defense, 19–7. The Packers' 7 points were the fewest points allowed in a game Rodgers finished; the 223 yards of total Packer offense were the lowest since Rodgers took over at quarterback and his 162 passing yards were also a career low. For the third consecutive season, the Packers were off to a 1–2 start. In those three games, Rodgers threw five touchdowns and one interception combined, with a passer rating of 95.1. Amid widespread concern, Rodgers told the fans and the media, "R-E-L-A-X. Relax. We're going to be OK."

After their loss to the Lions, the Packers went on a four-game win streak, during which, Rodgers threw 13 touchdowns with no interceptions. In Week 4, a 38–17 victory over the Bears, he had 302 passing yards and four touchdowns to earn NFC Offensive Player of the Week. In Week 6, against the Miami Dolphins, Rodgers led the Packers to a game-winning drive with less than two minutes remaining. He completed a 4th & 10 pass to wide receiver Jordy Nelson and mimicked Dan Marino's famous fake spike play by completing a pass to wide receiver Davante Adams to get to within four yards of the endzone later in the drive. Rodgers then completed a touchdown pass to tight end Andrew Quarless to win the game 27–24. This play would later win Rodgers the GMC Never Say Never Moment of the Year Award. In Week 7, a 38–17 victory over the Carolina Panthers, he was 19-of-22 for 255 passing yards and three touchdowns to earn NFC Offensive Player of the Week.

In a Week 8 loss against the Saints, Rodgers finished 28 of 39 for 418 yards, with one touchdown pass and two interceptions, ending his 212 consecutive attempts without an interception streak—the second longest in team history. In the game, Rodgers injured his hamstring which appeared to have an effect on his play for the remainder of the game.

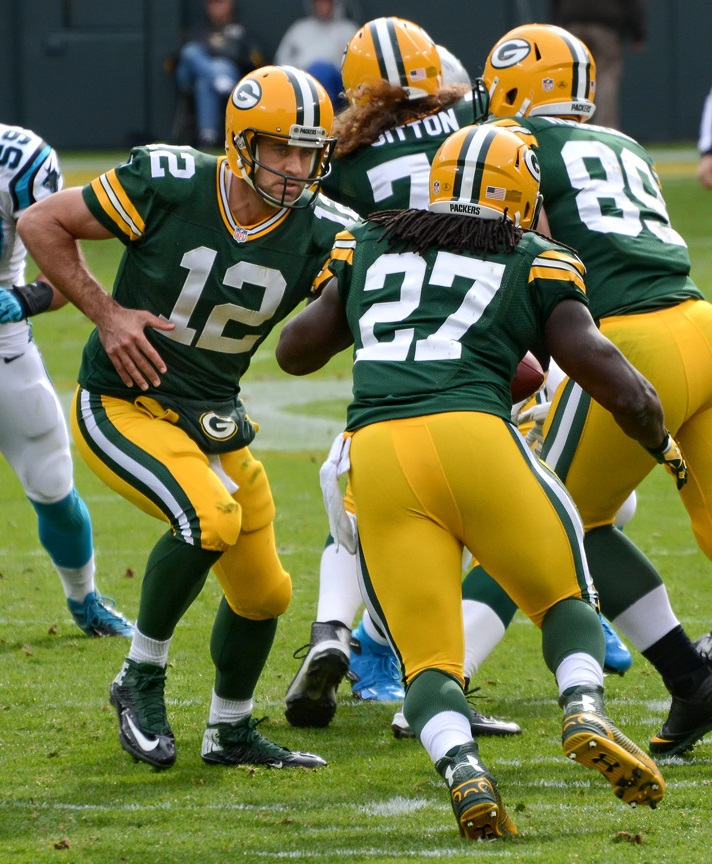
Rodgers handing the ball off to running back Eddie Lacy in 2014

In Week 10, against the Chicago Bears, Rodgers became the second player in NFL history and the first since Daryle Lamonica in 1969 to throw six touchdown passes in the first half. Rodgers finished 18 of 27 for 315 yards and six touchdowns despite only playing one drive in the second half to earn NFC Offensive Player of the Week. Rodgers set multiple records during the game: most touchdown passes of 70 or more yards with 16—breaking the record held by Brett Favre and Peyton Manning, most consecutive touchdown passes without an interception at home—breaking the record also held by Favre and Manning, and became the first quarterback to ever have 10 touchdown passes against the same team in a season. The 55–14 victory tied the Packers' 55–7 win vs. the Titans in 2009 for the most points scored by a Rodgers-led offense.

In a Week 11 game against the 7–2 Eagles, Rodgers set a record for most consecutive attempts at home without an interception, breaking Tom Brady's record of 288 consecutive attempts. In the 53–20 victory, he finished going 22 of 36, with 341 passing yards, three touchdown passes and no interceptions.

The 8–3 Packers met the 9–2 Patriots in Week 13, at Lambeau Field in what was Brady and Rodgers' first time playing against each other as starters. Rodgers finished going 24 of 38, with 368 passing yards and two passing touchdowns in the 26–21 Packers victory. For his efforts in the month of November, he earned NFC Offensive Player of the Month.

Rodgers suffered a calf injury in Week 16, against the Buccaneers, due to severe dehydration he endured from flu-like symptoms he suffered during the week.

In the Week 17 game against the Lions, Rodgers re-injured his left calf while extending a play and throwing a touchdown pass to Randall Cobb, then was helped off the field, and carted off to the locker room. After missing a series, Rodgers re-entered the game with the score tied 14–14. Despite being less mobile with the injury, Rodgers completed 13 of 15 passes for 129 yards and two scores against the league's second-ranked defense. The Packers won 30–20, winning their fourth straight NFC North title. Rodgers finished 17 of 22 for 226 yards, two touchdown passes, no interceptions, a 139.6 passer rating, and a rushing touchdown to earn his fourth NFC Offensive Player of the Week honor for the 2014 season.

The Packers secured the second seed in the NFC, rewarding them with a playoff bye and a week off which helped Rodgers rest and rehabilitate his injured left calf. In the Divisional Round, the Packers were scheduled to play the 13–4 Cowboys, which marked the first time in NFL playoff history when a team which went undefeated at home (Packers) played against a team which went undefeated away (Cowboys). Rodgers helped secure a 26–21 victory by finishing 24 of 35 for 316 yards, three touchdowns, no interceptions, and a 125.4 passer rating.

The Packers then traveled to Seattle to face the top-seeded Seahawks in a rematch of the regular season opener. In the NFC Championship Game, the Packers were leading 19–7 with just over five minutes to go, but the home team's offense finally woke up and, with the assistance of a crucial Packers special teams gaffe on an onside kick, the Seahawks led 22–19, with 44 seconds remaining. Rodgers quickly drove downfield to set up a tying field goal, only to watch from the sidelines as the Seahawks won the coin toss in overtime and proceeded to score the game-winning touchdown on their first possession. Rodgers was 19-for-34 for 178 yards and a touchdown, with two interceptions in the losing effort.

Rodgers finished the regular season first in touchdown-to-interception ratio (7.6), lowest interception percentage (1.0%), second in passer rating (112.2), yards per attempt (8.4), and touchdown passing percentage (7.1%), third in touchdown passes (38), seventh in passing yards (4,381), and ninth in completion percentage (65.6%). He set an NFL record for most consecutive pass attempts (512) at home without an interception, and touchdown passes (41).

Rodgers was voted the AP NFL Most Valuable Player for the 2014 season, receiving 31 votes, and was named NFC Offensive Player of the Year by the Kansas City Committee of 101 and Fed-Ex Air NFL Player of the Year. He was also named to the AP All-Pro team as the first quarterback, receiving 44 votes while runner-up Tony Romo received three. He was named to the Pro Bowl for the 2014 season. He was ranked as the second best player in the league among his fellow players on the NFL Top 100 Players of 2015.

==== 2015 ====
In 2015, Rodgers had a down year by his standards. He threw for a career low 3,821 yards in which he played for at least 15 games, although he had 31 touchdowns to just eight interceptions. Rodgers completed only 60.7 of his passes, averaged only 6.7 yards per attempt and finished with a passer rating of 92.7, all career lows. Pro Bowl wide receiver Jordy Nelson's absence due to injury for the season was considered a contributing factor in Rodgers' statistical drop compared to previous seasons.

In Week 3, a 38–28 victory over the Chiefs, Rodgers had 333 passing yards and five touchdowns to earn NFC Offensive Player of the Week. During Week 9 against the Panthers, he finished with 369 passing yards, four touchdowns, and one interception. The interception came with only 1:47 left in the fourth quarter, and following the interception, Rodgers expressed frustration by throwing down a Microsoft Surface tablet. The Packers ended up losing the game 29–37.

On December 3, 2015, in a Week 13 match-up against the Lions, Rodgers threw a Hail Mary pass caught by Richard Rodgers for 61 yards with 0:00 left to beat the Lions 27–23, after the game was extended due to a facemask penalty called on Detroit. The play was quickly dubbed as "The Miracle in Motown."

The Packers made the playoffs as the fifth seed in the NFC with a 10–6 record. They defeated the Redskins 35–18 on the road in the Wild Card Round of the playoffs. Rodgers finished the game with 210 yards and two passing touchdowns. In the Divisional Round against the Cardinals, Rodgers threw a 41-yard Hail Mary touchdown pass to Jeff Janis as time expired to send the game into overtime. However, the Packers lost 26–20 in overtime. Rodgers finished the game 24 for 44 for 261 yards with two touchdowns and an interception. He was named to his fifth Pro Bowl and was ranked as the sixth best player by his peers on the NFL Top 100 Players of 2016.

==== 2016 ====
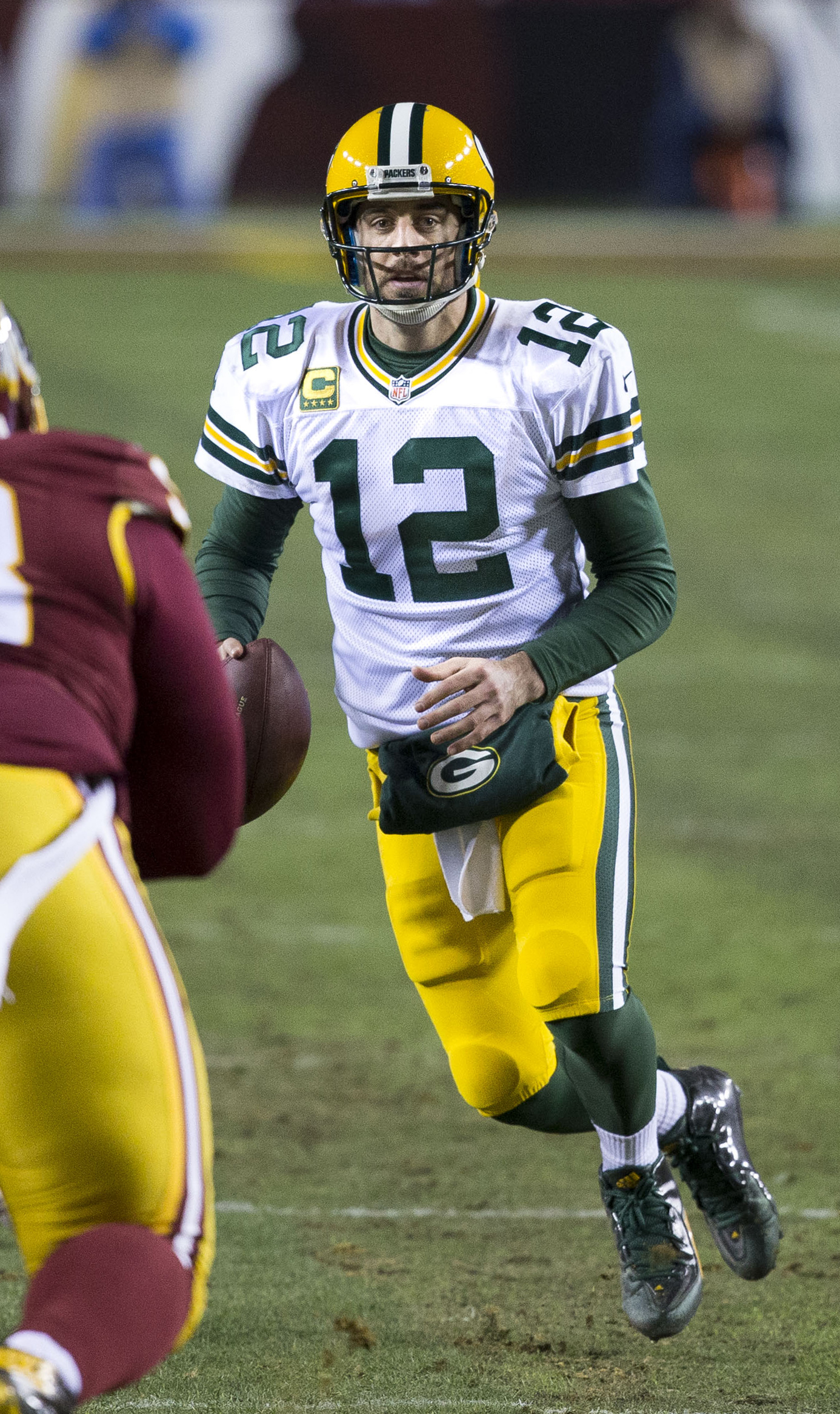
Rodgers in 2016

Throughout the first five games of the 2016 season, Rodgers' struggles from the 2015 season appeared to continue. Through those games, he completed 60.2% of his passes, averaged 6.5 yards per attempt, and posted a passer rating of 88.4—all of which were similar to his 2015 numbers. He also fumbled five times, and lost two. His lackluster performance through those games caused much speculation about the causes of his problems.

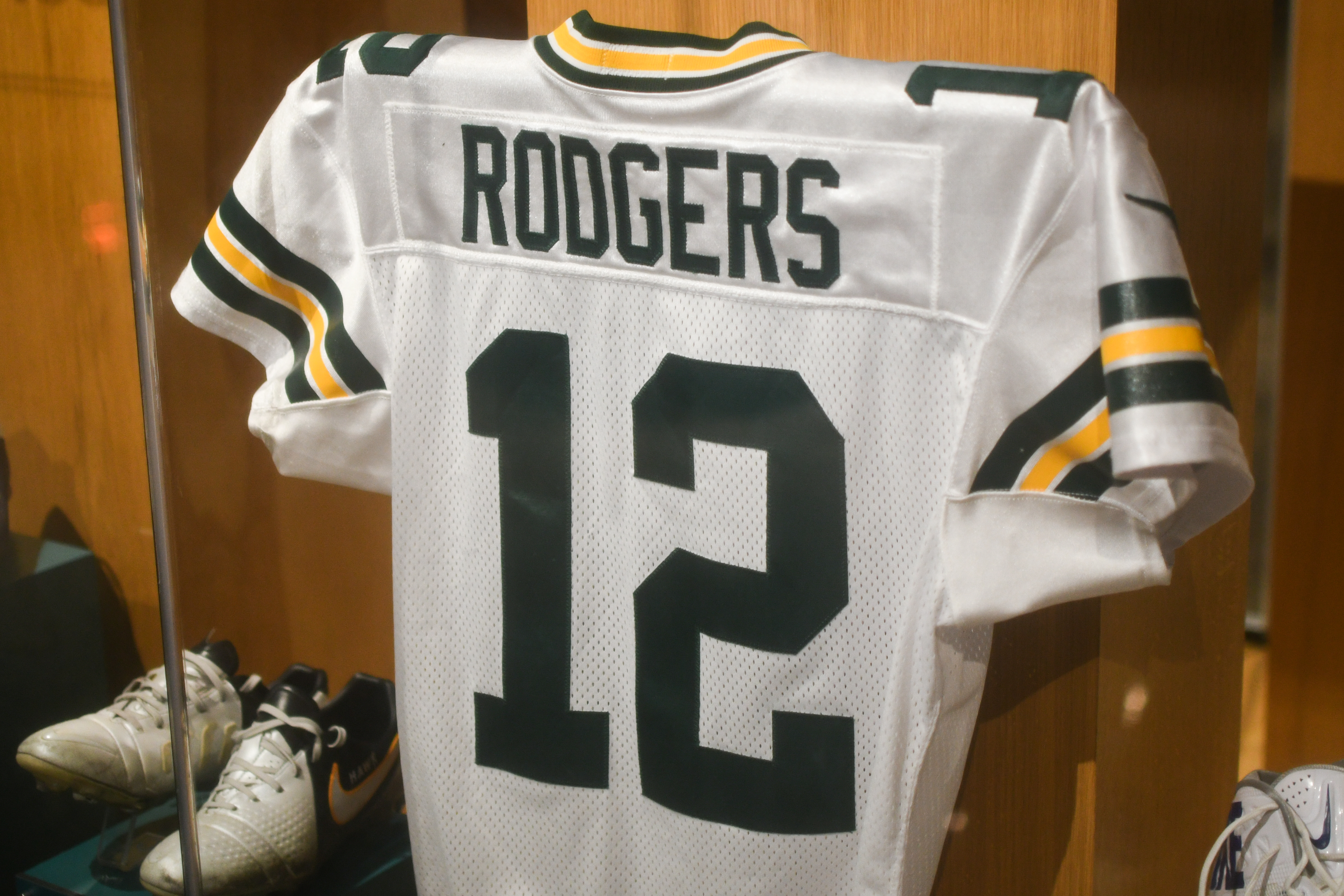
Rodgers' uniform exhibited at the Pro Football Hall of Fame

In a Week 7 Thursday Night Football game against the Bears, Rodgers rebounded by recording a franchise record and career-high 39 completions, breaking Brett Favre's previous record of 36 in 1993, also against the Bears. Rodgers recorded 326 passing yards for his first 300-yard passing game since Week 10 of the 2015 season in the 26–10 win. The following week against the Atlanta Falcons, Rodgers recorded a career regular season high of 60 rushing yards, and finished with four touchdown passes and a 125.5 passer rating.

After a Week 11 loss to the Redskins—the Packers' fourth in a row, putting them at 4–6—Rodgers was optimistic about the remainder of the season, saying, "I feel like we can run the table, I really do." Despite widespread doubt over the likelihood of such a run, the Packers would go on to finish the season with six straight wins—as Rodgers said they could.

In a Week 12 Monday Night Football game Rodgers appeared to injure his hamstring on a scrambling play against the Eagles. After the play, Rodgers went into an injury tent on the sideline to get his leg taped up. Rodgers, however, did not miss any snaps in the game and finished 30 out of 39 for 313 yards with no sacks or interceptions. His 300-yard performance was his fourth of the season and the first allowed by the Eagles' defense all season. The Packers won, 27–13, snapping their four-game losing streak.

In a 38–10 victory over the Seahawks in a Week 14 game, Rodgers and the Packers continued their recent offensive and defensive success. Rodgers finished with 246 passing yards, three touchdown passes and a 150.8 passer rating. The 150.8 passer rating was the best recorded against Seattle's defense since head coach Pete Carroll took over in 2010. Rodgers did this despite suffering a calf injury early in the game. He was named NFC Offensive Player of the Week for his performance against the Seahawks.

On December 20, 2016, Rodgers was selected to his third consecutive Pro Bowl and his sixth overall in his career.

During Week 16, Rodgers and Drew Brees tied the NFL record for most seasons with at least 35 touchdown passes with four—a record shared with Peyton Manning and Tom Brady. In the game against the Vikings, Rodgers finished 28 of 38 for 347 yards, four touchdown passes and a rushing touchdown to earn NFC Offensive Player of the Week. His 300-yard performance was the first allowed by the Vikings' defense all season. He also set Packer regular season records for most 4,000-yard passing seasons (6), most completions in a season (374), and—with Jordy Nelson—most touchdowns by a quarterback/wide receiver combination with (59). Rodgers was named NFC Offensive Player of the Month for December.

Rodgers helped lead the Packers to a NFC North title and a playoff berth in 2016. The Packers defeated the Giants in the Wild Card Round. Rodgers completed 25 of 40 passes for 364 yards and four touchdowns in the victory. They defeated the #1-seed Cowboys in the Divisional Round. With the game tied at 31 with only 18 seconds remaining with the ball on their own 32-yard line, Rodgers threw a 36-yard completion to tight end Jared Cook to put the Packers in Mason Crosby's field goal range. Crosby converted the 51-yard attempt as time expired to win the game. Overall, Rodgers completed 28 of 43 passes for 355 yards, two touchdowns and an interception in the victory. The Packers lost to the Falcons in the NFC Championship in the final game at the Georgia Dome. Rodgers completed 27 of his 45 passing attempts for 287 yards with three touchdowns and an interception in the losing effort.

In 2016, Rodgers finished with 401 completions and 610 attempts (both career highs), a 65.7% completion percentage, 4,428 passing yards, 40 touchdown passes, seven interceptions, a passer rating of 104.2, 369 rushing yards (career-high), and four rushing touchdowns. With his 40 touchdown passes, he led the league in the statistic for the first time in his career and became one of only four quarterbacks to pass for at least 40 touchdowns in multiple seasons. Rodgers also finished fourth in passing yards, completions, attempts, and passer rating. Among quarterbacks, he finished third in rushing yards and fifth in rushing touchdowns. He was ranked sixth by his peers on the NFL Top 100 Players of 2017.

==== 2017 ====
In a Week 1 victory over the Seahawks, Rodgers had his 50th career game with at least 300 passing yards. He finished the game with 311, but his streak of 251 consecutive passes without an interception came to an end when defensive tackle Nazair Jones picked him off in the first quarter. In a Week 2 loss of 34–23 to the Falcons, he had 343 passing yards, two touchdowns, and an interception in the first game in the new Mercedes-Benz Stadium in Atlanta. In Week 5, down by 28–31 against the Cowboys with less than two minutes on the clock, Rodgers led a nine-play, 75-yard touchdown drive in the 35–31 victory, earning him NFC Offensive Player of the Week.

During Week 6 against the Vikings, Rodgers was taken off the field by his coaches and medical personnel after suffering a shoulder injury on a hit from Anthony Barr. Shortly thereafter, it was revealed that Rodgers suffered a fractured right collarbone. The next day, on October 16, it was announced that Rodgers would have surgery on his broken collarbone. On October 19, he underwent surgery on his collarbone, and was officially placed on injured reserve the next day. A total of 13 screws were inserted to stabilize his collarbone.

Rodgers returned to practice on December 2, making him eligible to play in the upcoming Week 15 game. On December 12, it was announced that Rodgers was medically cleared by doctors and was set to start the next game against the Panthers. He was officially activated on December 16. As planned, Rodgers returned in Week 15 against the Panthers, where he finished with 290 passing yards, three touchdowns, and three interceptions as the Packers lost 24–31. However, on December 19, Rodgers was placed back on injured reserve after the Packers were eliminated from playoff contention. He was ranked No. 10 by his fellow players on the NFL Top 100 Players of 2018.

==== 2018 ====
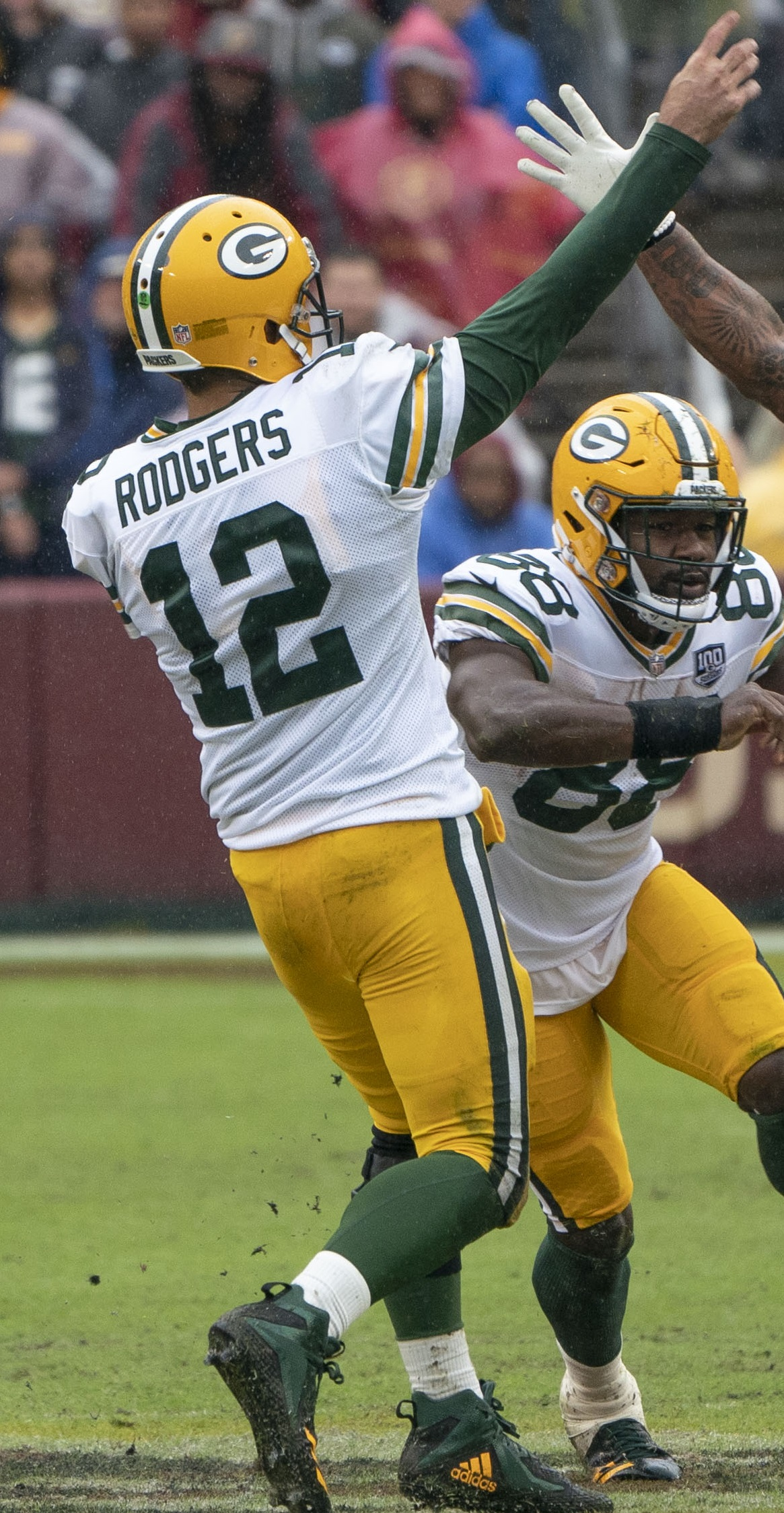
Rodgers throwing a pass in 2018

On August 29, 2018, Rodgers signed a four-year extension with the Packers worth $134 million featuring a $57.5 million signing bonus.

During Sunday Night Football against the Bears in Week 1, Rodgers left the game with a knee injury but returned in the third quarter. Down by 20 points, Rodgers finished with 286 passing yards and three touchdowns, leading the Packers rally to a 24–23 win. Despite a nagging knee injury, Rodgers had at least 40 pass attempts in each of the next three games. In the last of these, he threw his first interception in 150 attempts. In Week 5, Rodgers passed for 442 yards (the second-best of his career) and three touchdowns, but also two fumbles, in a 31–23 loss to the Lions. In the following game, a 33–30 victory over the 49ers, he had 425 passing yards and two passing touchdowns.

Following the bye-week, despite a continuing knee injury, Rodgers had his third consecutive week with a 100+ quarterback rating, which included 286 yards passing, no interceptions, and a go-ahead 40-yard touchdown pass to Marquez Valdes-Scantling in a 29–27 loss to the Los Angeles Rams.

In Week 14, against the Falcons, Rodgers set an NFL record by converting his 359th consecutive pass without an interception, breaking Tom Brady's previous record. In Week 15, against the Chicago Bears, Rodgers threw for 274 yards and an interception in a 24–17 loss. Rodgers' record streak without an interception ended with 402 pass attempts after he was intercepted by free safety Eddie Jackson. During Week 16 against the Jets, Rodgers finished with 442 passing yards, two passing touchdowns, and two rushing touchdowns. Trailing at one point by 15 points, Rodgers and the Packers won 44–38 in overtime. He matched his own feat of achieving at least 400 passing yards, two passing touchdowns, and two rushing touchdowns in a single game. The only other time in NFL history that occurred was when Rodgers accomplished it in 2011 against the Denver Broncos.

On December 18, 2018, Rodgers was named to his seventh Pro Bowl. He declined the appearance due to injury and was replaced by Russell Wilson.

In the regular season finale against the Detroit Lions, Rodgers suffered a concussion early in the game and would not return. He was then sent to the hospital to test for concussion symptoms. Because the Packers had already been eliminated from playoff contention, Rodgers answered questions about whether he should be playing, for fear of injury, by saying: "That's just not the way I lead, and I'm super-competitive, and I want to be out there with the guys and I look forward to being out there." Rodgers was later spotted at the Packers' facility after the game.

Rodgers finished the season with 372 completions, 597 attempts, 4,442 passing yards, 25 passing touchdowns, two interceptions and a passer rating of 97.6. His touchdown to interception ratio of 25:2 (12.5) ranks third best all-time (min. 300 attempts). In addition to setting the record for consecutive passes without an interception during the season, Rodgers set NFL records for interception percentage for a season, with only 0.335% of his passes being intercepted, and for the amount of thrown away passes. He was ranked eighth by his fellow players on the NFL Top 100 Players of 2019.

==== 2019 ====
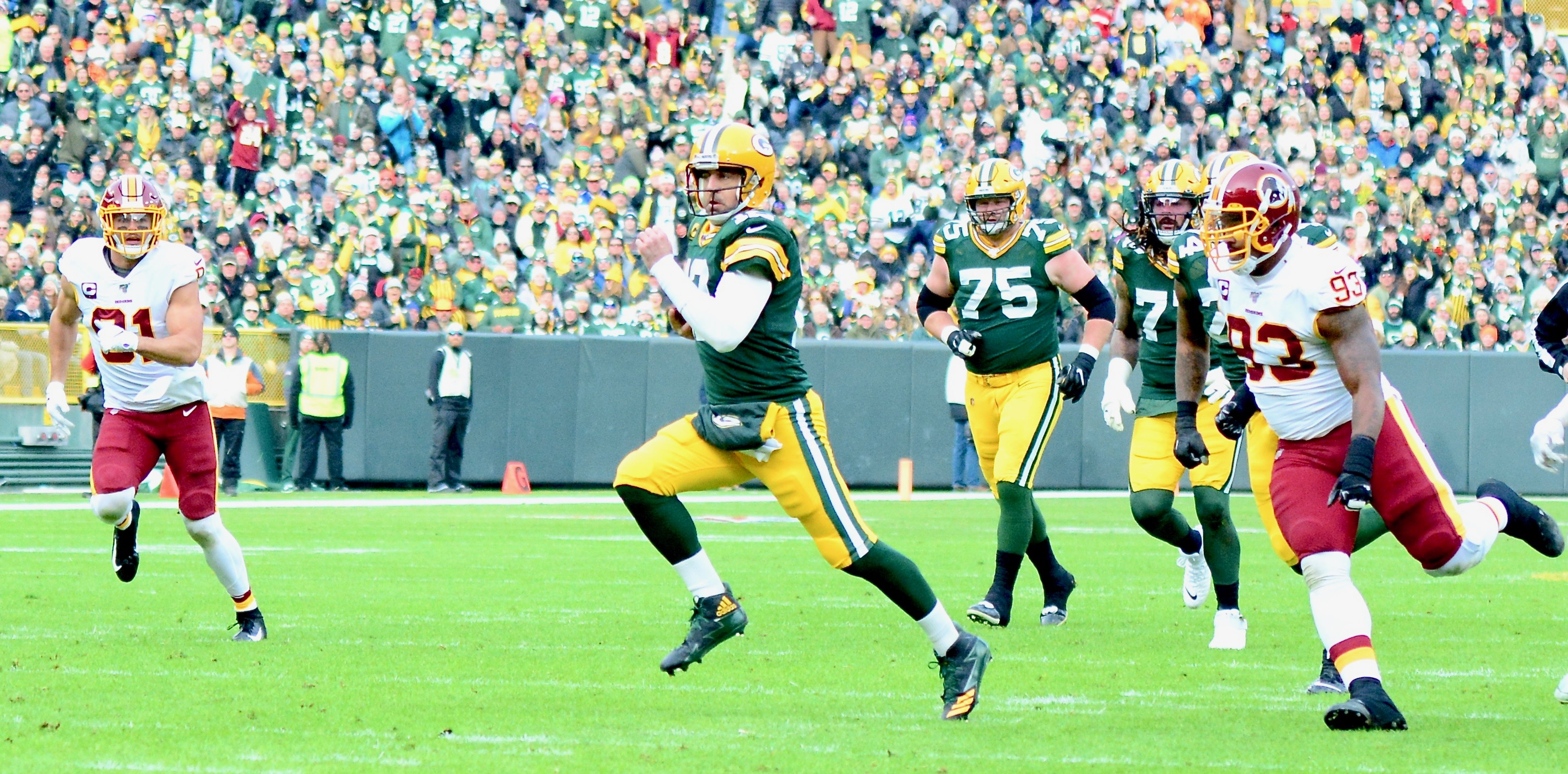
Rodgers in a game against the Washington Redskins

Rodgers started the 2019 season with a new head coach in Matt LaFleur following the firing of Mike McCarthy. The Packers offense relied less on Rodgers' trademark passes and more on heavy formations and play-action throws to take advantage of running back Aaron Jones.

Rodgers helped lead the Packers to a 3–0 start with victories over the Bears, Vikings, and Broncos. In Week 4, against the Eagles on Thursday Night Football, he had 422 passing yards and two passing touchdowns, but also threw the game-ending interception as the Packers were handed their first loss of the season by a score of 34–27. In Week 7, against the Raiders, Rodgers posted his first-ever game with a perfect passer rating of 158.3, the first quarterback in team history to do so. He completed 25-of-31 passes for 429 yards and five touchdowns in the 42–24 victory. He was named the NFC Offensive Player of the Week for his performance. In Week 17, against the Lions, Rodgers helped lead the team to a 23–20 comeback win. As a result of the victory, the Packers secured a first round bye in the playoffs. Rodgers finished the 2019 season with 4,002 passing yards, 26 passing touchdowns, and four interceptions.

In the Divisional Round of the playoffs against the Seahawks, Rodgers completed 16 passes on 27 attempts and threw for 243 yards and two touchdowns during the 28–23 win. In the NFC Championship Game against the 49ers, Rodgers completed 31 passes on 39 attempts and threw for 326 yards and two touchdowns, but also threw two interceptions, including one to Richard Sherman in the final two minutes of the game as the Packers lost 37–20. The loss marked Rodgers' third consecutive NFC Championship loss (a streak that would extend to four the following season). He was ranked 16th by his fellow players on the NFL Top 100 Players of 2020.

==== 2020: Third MVP ====
Prior to a Week 5 bye, Rodgers helped lead the Packers to a four-game winning streak to start the 2020 season. That winning streak would end in Week 6 against the Buccaneers, in which Rodgers threw for 160 yards and two interceptions, including a pick-six (the third of his professional career), during the 38–10 loss. After a 3–2 stretch for the team, Rodgers threw for 211 yards and four touchdowns in a 41–25 victory over the Bears in Week 12. During the game, he became the 11th player in NFL history to eclipse 50,000 career passing yards, achieving the milestone on a 39-yard touchdown pass to tight end Robert Tonyan midway through the third quarter. In Week 13 against the Eagles, Rodgers threw for 295 yards and three touchdowns during the 30–16 win. Rodgers' third touchdown pass of the game was to wide receiver Davante Adams and it was his 400th career touchdown pass. Rodgers was named the NFC Offensive Player of the Week for his performance in Week 13. On December 21, 2020, he was selected for the 2021 Pro Bowl. Rodgers was named the NFC Offensive Player of the Month for his performance in December after passing for 15 touchdowns and one interception in five victories for the Packers. Overall, Rodgers finished the 2020 regular season with 4,299 passing yards, 48 passing touchdowns, and five interceptions. His passing touchdowns total set a new franchise record. He had seven total games with four passing touchdowns. He led the league in numerous statistical categories, including completion percentage, touchdown passes, and passer rating. On January 8, 2021, he made the 2020 All-Pro Team first-team. The Pro Football Writers of America named him the NFL MVP.

The Packers finished with a 13–3 record, won the NFC North, and earned a first-round bye for the NFC playoffs. In the Divisional Round of the playoffs against the Rams, Rodgers threw for 296 yards and two touchdowns and also rushed for another touchdown during the 32–18 win. In the NFC Championship against the Buccaneers, Rodgers threw for 346 yards and three touchdowns, but also threw an interception and was sacked five times while being constantly pressured during the 31–26 loss. Rodgers fell to 1–4 in conference championship games, becoming the first quarterback in NFL history to lose four in a row. After the season, he won the AP Most Valuable Player Award as well as the FedEx Air Player of the Year. He was ranked 3rd by his fellow players on the NFL Top 100 Players of 2021.

==== 2021: Fourth MVP ====
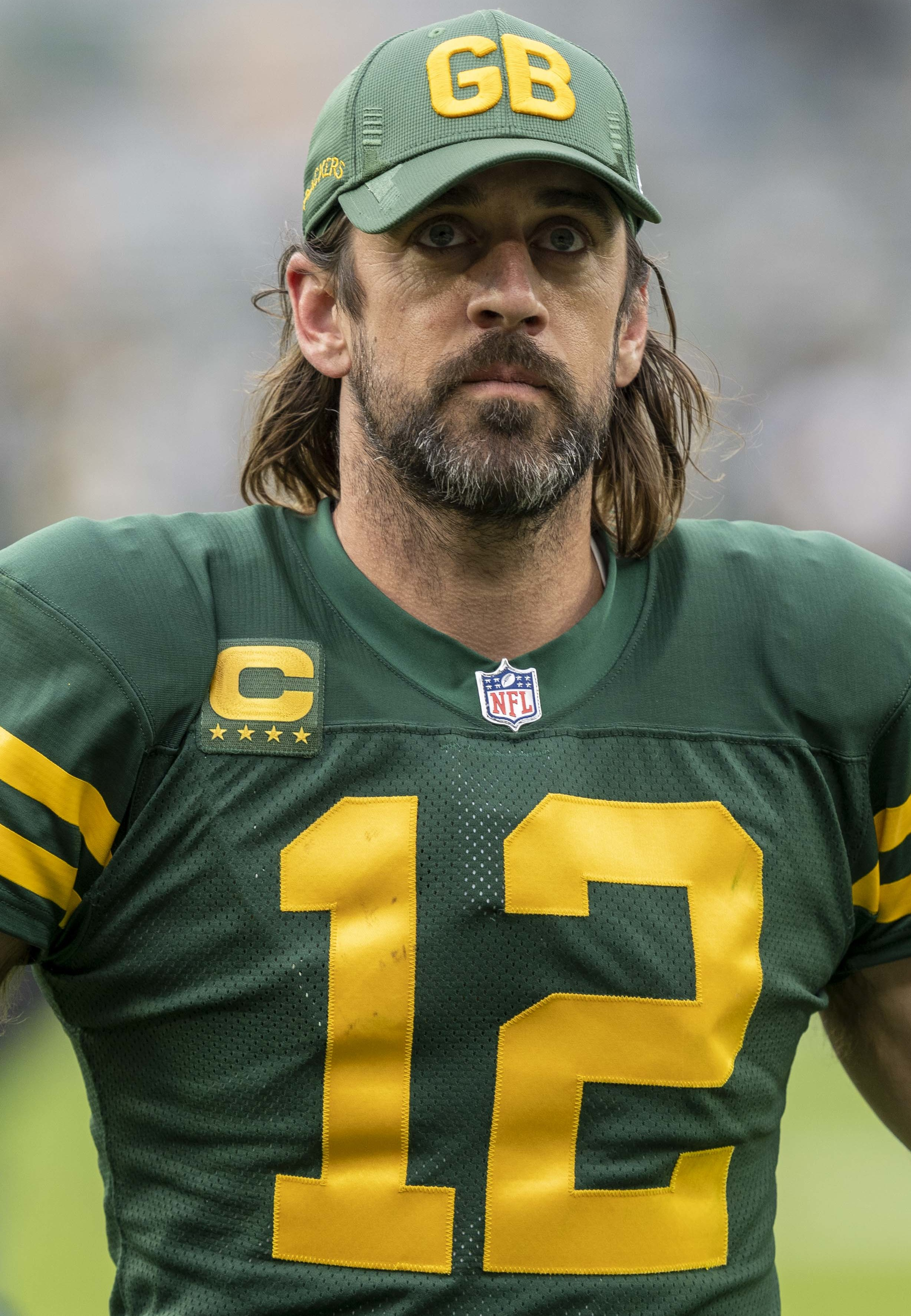
Rodgers in 2021

Rodgers' 2021 season had a rough start, as he completed 15 of 28 passes for 133 yards and two interceptions as Green Bay lost 38–3 to the Saints at TIAA Bank Field. He was pulled in the fourth quarter for Jordan Love as his chance of a comeback was all but eliminated. However, Rodgers and the Packers recovered, going on a seven-game winning streak following the loss to New Orleans.

In Week 6, Rodgers sealed a 24–14 victory against the Bears with a six-yard touchdown run with 4:34 to go in the fourth quarter. During his celebration, he yelled at the Chicago crowd, "All my f***ing life I own you! I still own you!" The utterance was heavily discussed in its aftermath, and two months later- when Rodgers played the second game against Chicago- he stated he had no regrets for making the comment.

Following a positive test for COVID-19, Rodgers was placed on the COVID-19 reserve list on November 3. He missed 10 days per the league's COVID-19 policies for unvaccinated players, including a game against the Chiefs. Despite answering "Yeah, I'm immunized" when asked during the preseason if he had been vaccinated against COVID-19, he had not actually received a vaccination. Instead, he had received homeopathic treatment from his personal doctor. While unvaccinated, he committed multiple violations of NFL COVID-19 protocols for unvaccinated players, including attending parties with teammates while not using PPE and appearing unmasked at multiple postgame press conferences. After a review, he was fined $14,650 for violations of the agreed protocols and his team was fined $300,000.

Rodgers was activated off the reserve/COVID-19 list on November 13, and returned to play the next day against the Seahawks, a game the Packers won 17–0. In Week 15, Rodgers threw for 268 yards and three touchdowns in a 31–30 win over the Ravens, which clinched the NFC North title for the Packers for a third consecutive season and earned him NFC Offensive Player of the Week honors. On December 23, 2021, Rodgers was named to his tenth Pro Bowl.

In a Week 16 victory over the Browns, Rodgers threw his 443rd career touchdown pass, passing Brett Favre for the most all-time career touchdown passes in Packers history. For his play in the month of December, Rodgers earned NFC Offensive Player of the Month honors. He finished the 2021 season with 4,115 passing yards, 37 touchdowns, and four interceptions. On January 14, 2022, Rodgers earned his fourth career first-team All-Pro selection.

In the Divisional Round against the 49ers, Rodgers threw for 225 yards, but a poor performance by the special teams unit haunted the Packers, losing 13–10. It was Rodgers' fourth loss in as many games to the 49ers in the postseason and Rodgers' second home divisional loss. He also failed to notice a wide–open Allen Lazard (and Equanimeous St. Brown) on his last throw of the game, instead targeting Davante Adams in double coverage for a Hail Mary attempt. After the season, Rodgers won the AP NFL Most Valuable Player Award for the second consecutive season and the fourth time overall. Rodgers became the fifth player to win consecutive MVPs and first since Peyton Manning between 2008 and 2009. Rodgers joined Manning as the only players in NFL history to win at least four MVPs. He was ranked third by his fellow players on the NFL Top 100 Players of 2022.

==== 2022 ====
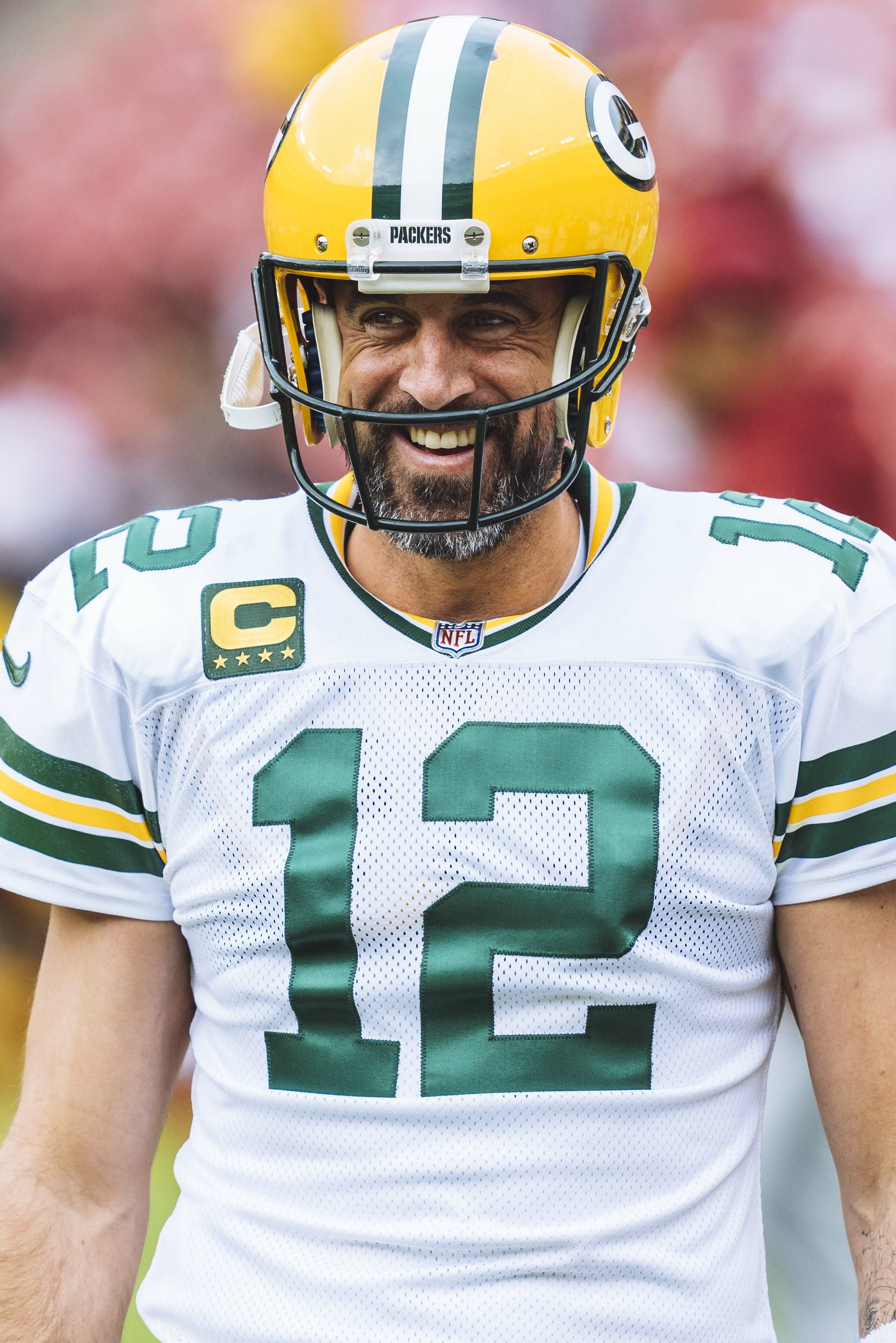
Rodgers in 2022

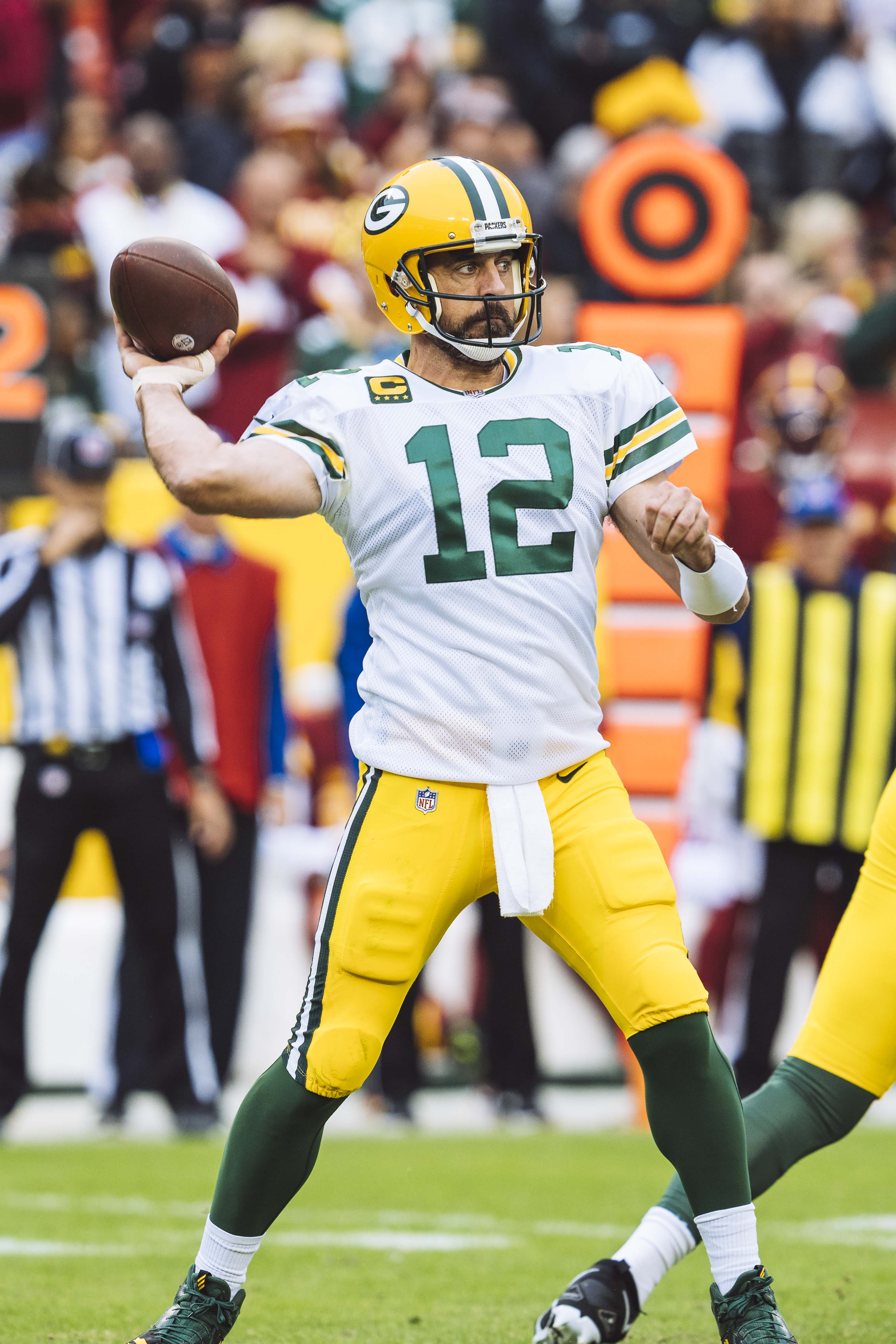
Rodgers playing against the Washington Commanders in 2022

On March 8, Rodgers confirmed that he would return and play for the Packers for the 2022 season after speculations that Rodgers could retire or demand a trade to another team. There were reports that Rodgers and the Packers had agreed to terms on a 4-year, $200 million contract extension that would have made him the highest-paid player in NFL history, but Rodgers denied those reports on Twitter, stating that the numbers on the proposed contract were inaccurate, and that he had yet to sign such a contract. He did confirm, however, that he would return to play his 18th NFL season with the Packers.

On March 16, he officially signed his contract extension. The final terms of the contract was a 3-year contract (which replaced the final year of his existing contract) worth $150.8 million, with $101.5 million guaranteed. The new contract made him the highest paid player in North American sports history on an annual basis, surpassing the NBA's Damian Lillard's $49 million per annum contract.

In the season opener against the Vikings, Rodgers threw for 195 yards and an interception in the 23–7 loss. In Week 4 against the Patriots, Rodgers threw for 251 yards and two touchdowns, but also threw his fourth career pick-six to Jack Jones in the 27–24 overtime win. In Week 5 at London, Rodgers threw for 222 yards and two touchdowns in an upset loss against the Giants. In Week 8 against the Buffalo Bills on Sunday Night Football, Rodgers threw for 203 yards, two touchdowns and one interception as the Packers lost their fourth consecutive game in the 27–17 defeat. The next week against the Lions, Rodgers threw for 291 yards, a touchdown, and three interceptions in the 15–9 loss. It was the first time since Week 15 of the 2017 season that Rodgers threw three interceptions in a game. Rodgers bounced back the following week against the Cowboys, completing 14-of-20 passes for 224 yards and three touchdowns in 31–28 overtime victory. Following a Week 11 loss to the Titans, Rodgers confirmed he has been playing with a broken thumb on his throwing hand he suffered in Week 5. A Week 12 loss to the Eagles left the Packers with a 4–8 record, but the team rallied off four consecutive wins to get to 8–8 before the regular season finale. The Packers finished with an 8–9 record and missed the postseason following a Week 18 loss to the Detroit Lions in a win-and-in scenario for Green Bay. After the game, Rodgers put his arm around long-time teammate Cobb, and looked solemnly around Lambeau Field before the two walked down the tunnel together. Some suspected that this indicated that Rodgers had played his last game for the Packers.

Rodgers finished the 2022 season with 3,695 passing yards, 26 touchdowns, and 12 interceptions, which marked the most for Rodgers in a single season since 2008. He was ranked 51st by his fellow players on the NFL Top 100 Players of 2023.

=== New York Jets ===
==== 2023: Achilles injury ====
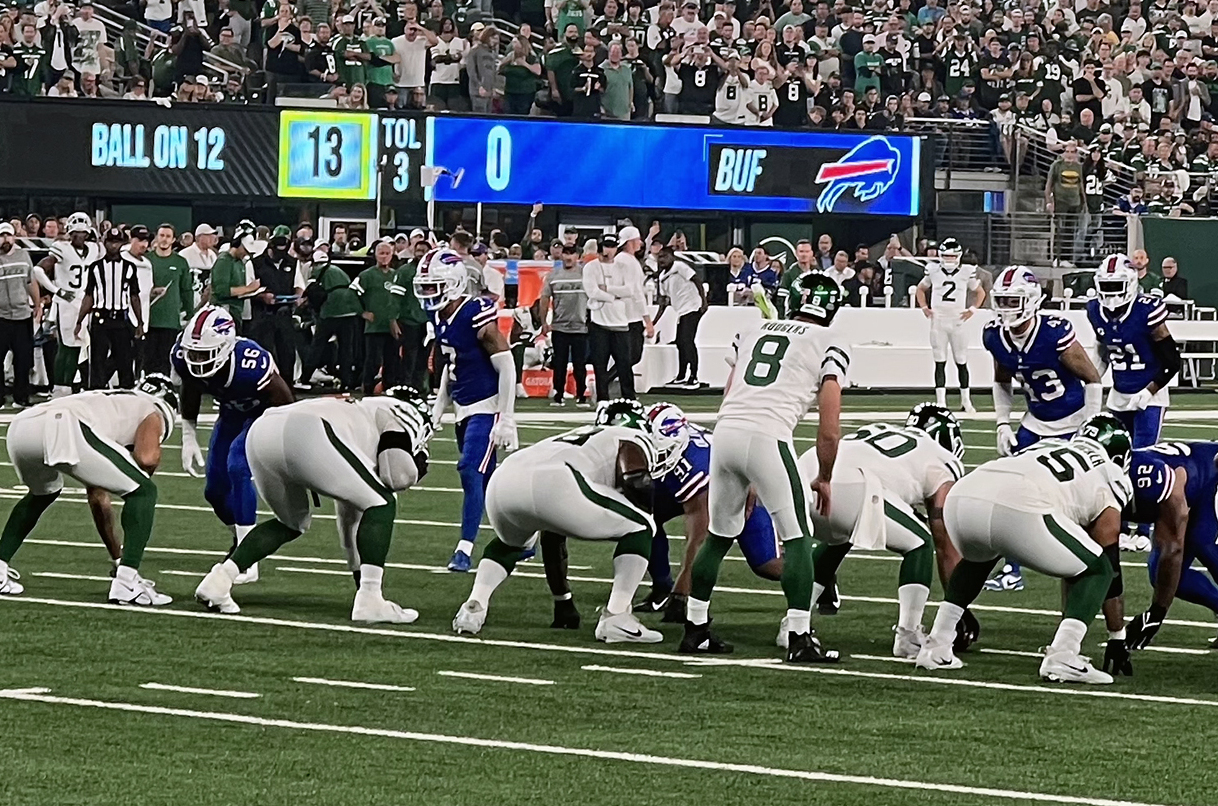
Rodgers (white, #8) takes a snap against the Bills, shortly before his injury.

On April 26, 2023, Rodgers was traded to the Jets, along with the Packers' first and fifth-round selections in the 2023 NFL draft, in exchange for the Jets' first, second (via Cleveland) and sixth-round selections in the 2023 draft and a conditional second-round selection (which would have converted to a first if Rodgers played 65% of the offensive snaps in 2023, but it did not happen) in the 2024 NFL draft. The move echoed the career path of his predecessor Brett Favre, who similarly spent over fifteen years as quarterback of the Packers before being traded to the Jets. Although Joe Namath granted Rodgers permission to wear his retired No. 12 jersey, Rodgers announced that he would return to wearing the No. 8 jersey, which he had worn throughout his college career with the California Golden Bears. On July 26, 2023, Rodgers took a pay cut and agreed to a reworked contract with the Jets.

Making his Jets debut in Week 1 on Monday Night Football against the Bills at MetLife Stadium, Rodgers injured his left ankle on just his fourth offensive snap after being sacked by Bills' defensive end Leonard Floyd. Rodgers was helped off the field and later carted to the locker room for further evaluation. Rodgers' backup Zach Wilson went on to lead the Jets to a 22–16 win in overtime. The next day, Rodgers was diagnosed with an Achilles tendon rupture and was later placed on injured reserve. Rodgers underwent surgery on September 13, with Dr. Neal ElAttrache placing an internal brace in his left Achilles with the goal of a mid-January return at the earliest. On November 29, the New York Jets opened the 21-day practice window for Rodgers. Limited in practice, Rodgers was cleared for functional activity but not contact. He was activated off injured reserve on December 20, but the Jets announced he would not play again this season after their Week 15 loss to the Dolphins mathematically eliminated them from playoff contention. Despite missing most of the season, he was ranked 92nd by his fellow players on the NFL Top 100 Players of 2024.

==== 2024 ====
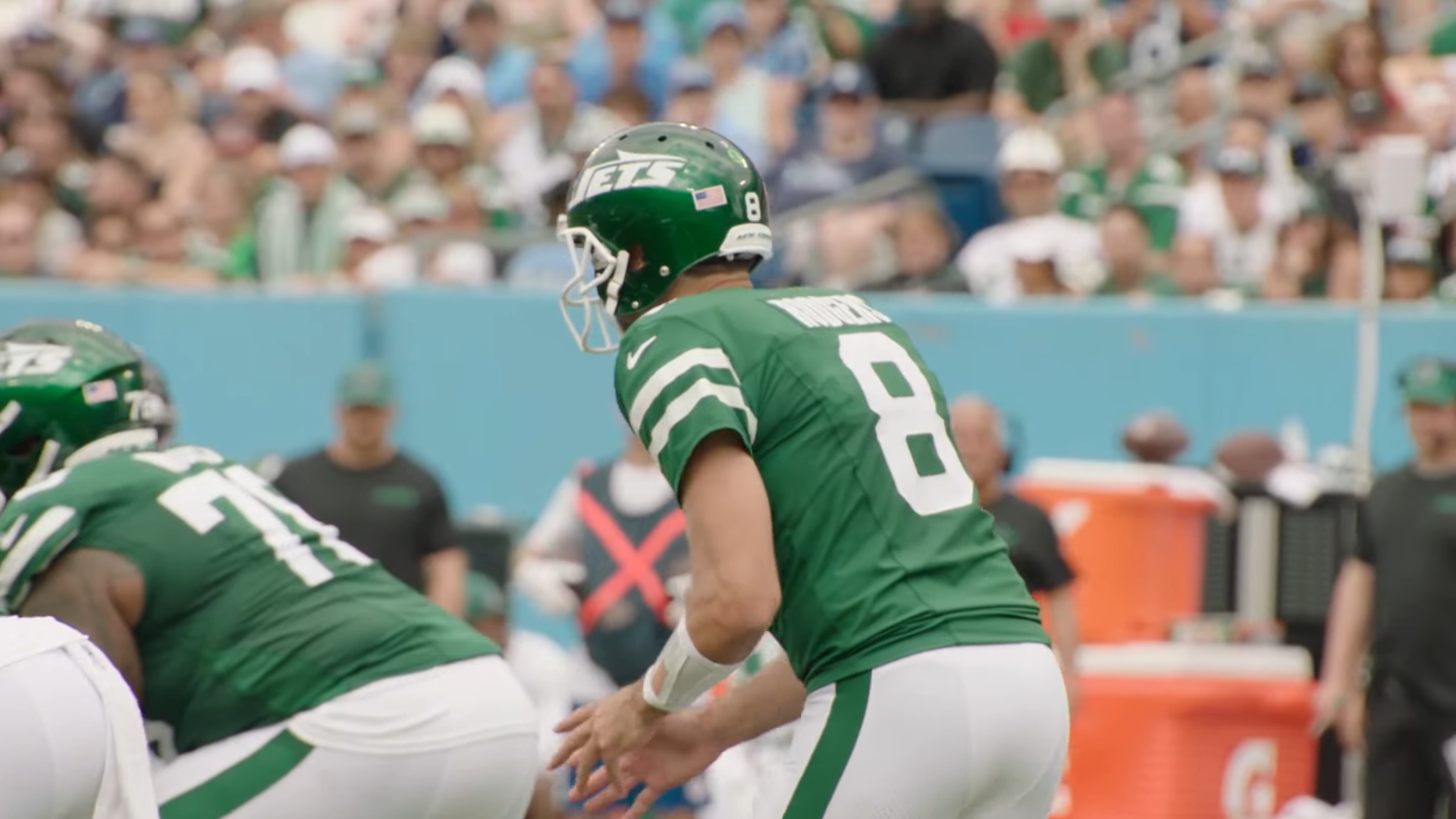
Rodgers playing against the Tennessee Titans at Nissan Stadium in 2024

After playing just four offensive snaps in his first season with the Jets due to an Achilles injury, Rodgers made his return on Monday Night Football in Week 1 to kick off the 2024 campaign. In his highly anticipated return, Rodgers completed 13 of 21 passes for 167 yards, one touchdown and one interception in a 32–19 loss to the defending NFC champion San Francisco 49ers. In the Jets' home opener against the New England Patriots, Rodgers completed 27 of 35 passes for 281 yards and two touchdowns as the Jets cruised to a 24–3 victory. In Week 5 in London, Rodgers became the ninth quarterback in NFL history to reach 60,000 passing yards but tied his career-high with three interceptions, including a game-sealing pick with under a minute left as the Jets lost 23–17 to the Vikings. Jets head coach Robert Saleh was unexpectedly fired after the London loss, with some analysts perceiving that he did not get along with Rodgers. When asked about it on The Pat McAfee Show, Rodgers firmly denied accusations that he had a role in Saleh's termination.

In Week 6, the Jets' first game after Saleh's termination, Rodgers threw for 294 yards and two touchdowns, including a 52-yard Hail Mary pass to Allen Lazard to close out the first half, his fourth career such pass completion. However, another interception on the Jets' final drive doomed them as they lost 23–20 to the Buffalo Bills. Following the loss, the Jets traded for Davante Adams, with whom Rodgers had previously combined for over 600 receptions and 68 touchdowns during their eight seasons together in Green Bay. However, the Jets continued to struggle, as Rodgers threw two interceptions and led the offense to zero points in the second half of their Week 7 matchup against the Steelers, losing their fourth consecutive game. After a loss to the Patriots, Rodgers helped the Jets snap their five-game losing streak in Week 9 against the Houston Texans, throwing for 179 yards and three touchdowns in the second half after being shutout in the first half as the Jets won 21–13.

In Week 11 against the Colts, Rodgers threw two touchdowns and led the Jets to a season-high in points, but they fell short in a 28–27 loss, dropping to 3–7. During their bye week, it was revealed that Rodgers had been playing through hamstring, knee, and ankle injuries but had refused to get scans done in fear of how severe they would be. Despite this, he remained the starter following the bye week. Entering Week 14, Rodgers held an NFL-record 34-game drought without a 300-yard passing performance, which he broke on December 8 against the Dolphins. Despite recording his first 300-yard game in three years, the Jets fell 32–26 in overtime, eliminating them from playoff contention. On January 5, 2025, Rodgers completed his 500th touchdown pass to Tyler Conklin at MetLife Stadium against the Dolphins, becoming the fifth quarterback in NFL history with 500 touchdown passes. He finished the final game of the season with 274 yards, a season-high four touchdowns, and an interception as the Jets won 32–20, finishing with a record of 5–12. He finished the 2024 season with 3,897 yards, 28 touchdowns, and 11 interceptions.

On February 13, 2025, the Jets announced their intention to part ways with Rodgers after two seasons. Rodgers was released as a post-June 1 designation, allowing the Jets to split his salary cap charges ($49 million) over two years. The Jets therefore kept him on the roster until March 12, the start of the 2025 NFL year, when they officially released him.

=== Pittsburgh Steelers ===
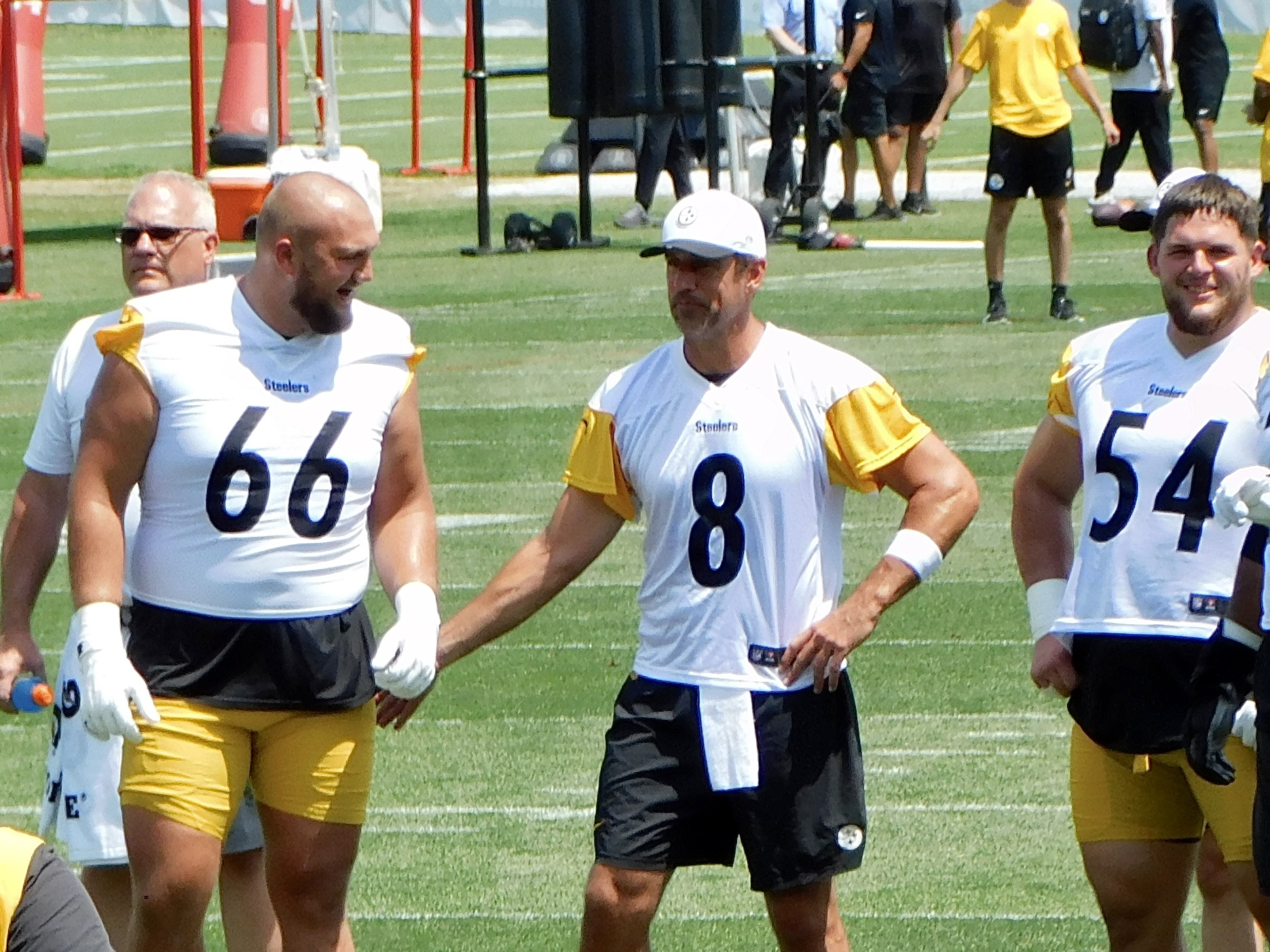
Rodgers (middle) at Steelers training camp in 2025

==== 2025 ====
On June 6, 2025, the Pittsburgh Steelers agreed to terms with Rodgers on a one-year deal. The following day, he officially signed his one-year, $13.65 million contract, which includes $10 million guaranteed and can be worth up to $19.5 million with incentives. The team subsequently announced that Rodgers will continue to wear his number 8 from Cal and the Jets, since his number 12 with the Packers is unofficially retired for Terry Bradshaw; neither the Steelers nor Bradshaw signed off on allowing Rodgers to wear number 12.

Rodgers' months-long courtship and subsequent signing was met with mixed to negative reaction among Steeler fans as well as ex-Steelers Bradshaw and Ryan Clark due to his polarizing attitude, with some fans feeling like he did not fit Western Pennsylvania's traditional blue collar base. Some have speculated that Rodgers may have been swayed to sign with the Steelers by his friendship with former Indianapolis Colts punter and Pittsburgh-area native Pat McAfee. On June 23, 2025, Rodgers told McAfee on his show that he would likely retire after the 2025 season.

On September 7, Rodgers made his Steelers debut against his former team, the New York Jets. During his first outing with Pittsburgh, he completed 22 of 30 pass attempts for 244 yards and four touchdowns while committing no turnovers. The game ended with a 34–32 Steelers victory. Later that month, Rodgers surpassed Brett Favre, his former Packers teammate, in career touchdown passes when he threw a scoring pass to D.K. Metcalf in a win over the New England Patriots. This moved Rodgers into fourth place for most career touchdown passes (509), only behind Peyton Manning, Drew Brees and Tom Brady.

During the second quarter of the Steelers' Week 11 victory over the Cincinnati Bengals, Rodgers suffered a small fracture in his left wrist. The injury prevented him from playing the following game against the Bears, which Mason Rudolph started in his place. Rodgers returned for Week 13 in Buffalo.

Rodgers led the Steelers to an AFC North title and a playoff berth following a Week 18 win over the Baltimore Ravens. He finished the 2025 season throwing for 3,322 yards, 24 touchdowns, and seven interceptions, and rushing for a touchdown.

In the Steelers' playoff loss to the Houston Texans, Rodgers played poorly, completing 17 passes out of 33 attempts for 146 yards, getting sacked 4 times for 36 yards, and throwing a pick-six. Rodgers also fumbled on one of the sacks, which was returned for a Texans touchdown.

==== 2026 ====
Rodgers hands the ball off to Jaylen Warren in 2026

On May 16, 2026, Rodgers returned to the Steelers for his 22nd season, signing a one-year deal worth up to $25 million. The signing reunited him with head coach Mike McCarthy. Rodgers later announced that the 2026 season would be his final season in the NFL.

== Career statistics ==
Legend
	AP NFL MVP
	Super Bowl MVP
	Won the Super Bowl
	NFL record
	Led the league
**Bold**	Career best

=== NFL ===
==== Regular season ====
Regular season
Year	Team	Games			Passing											Rushing					Sacked		Fumbles	
Year	Team	GP	GS	Record	Cmp	Att	Pct	Yds	Y/A	Lng	TD	Int	TD%	Int%	Rtg	Att	Yds	Y/A	Lng	TD	Sck	SckY	Fum	Lost
2005	GB	3	0	—	9	16	56.3	65	4.1	16	0	1	0.0	6.3	39.8	2	7	3.5	8	0	3	28	2	2
2006	GB	2	0	—	6	15	40.0	46	3.1	16	0	0	0.0	**0.0**	48.2	2	11	5.5	6	0	3	18	1	1
2007	GB	2	0	—	20	28	71.4	218	7.8	43	1	0	3.6	**0.0**	106.0	7	29	4.1	13	0	3	24	0	0
2008	GB	16	16	6–10	341	536	63.6	4,038	7.5	71	28	13	5.2	2.4	93.8	56	207	3.7	21	4	34	231	10	3
2009	GB	16	16	11–5	350	541	64.7	4,434	8.2	83	30	7	5.5	1.3	103.2	58	316	5.4	**35**	**5**	50	306	10	4
2010	GB	15	15	10–5	312	475	65.7	3,922	8.3	86	28	11	5.9	2.3	101.2	64	356	5.6	27	4	31	193	4	1
2011	GB	15	15	**14–1**	343	502	68.3	**4,643**	**9.2**	**93**	45	6	9.0	1.2	**122.5**	60	257	4.3	25	3	36	219	4	**0**
2012	GB	16	16	11–5	371	552	67.2	4,295	7.8	73	39	8	7.1	1.4	108.0	54	259	4.8	27	2	51	293	5	4
2013	GB	9	9	6–3	193	290	66.6	2,536	8.7	83	17	6	5.9	2.1	104.9	30	120	4.0	18	0	21	**117**	4	**0**
2014	GB	16	16	12–4	341	520	65.6	4,381	8.4	80	38	5	7.3	0.9	112.2	43	269	**6.3**	19	2	28	174	10	2
2015	GB	16	16	10–6	347	572	60.7	3,821	6.7	65	31	8	5.4	1.4	92.7	58	344	5.9	18	1	46	314	8	4
2016	GB	16	16	10–6	**401**	**610**	65.7	4,428	7.3	66	40	7	6.6	1.1	104.2	**67**	**369**	5.5	23	4	35	246	8	4
2017	GB	7	7	4–3	154	238	64.7	1,675	7.0	72	16	6	6.7	2.5	97.2	24	126	5.3	18	0	22	168	**1**	1
2018	GB	16	16	6–9–1	372	597	62.3	4,442	7.4	75	25	**2**	4.2	0.3	97.6	43	269	**6.3**	23	2	49	353	6	3
2019	GB	16	16	13–3	353	569	62.0	4,002	7.0	74	26	4	4.6	0.7	95.4	46	183	4.0	17	1	36	284	4	4
2020	GB	16	16	13–3	372	526	**70.7**	4,299	8.2	78	**48**	5	**9.1**	0.9	121.5	38	149	3.9	14	3	**20**	182	4	2
2021	GB	16	16	13–3	366	531	68.9	4,115	7.7	75	37	4	7.0	0.8	111.9	33	101	3.1	18	3	30	188	3	**0**
2022	GB	17	17	8–9	350	542	64.6	3,695	6.8	58	26	12	4.8	2.2	91.1	34	94	2.8	18	1	32	258	8	4
2023	NYJ	1	1	1–0	0	1	0.0	0	0.0	0	0	0	0.0	**0.0**	39.6	0	0	—	0	0	1	10	0	0
2024	NYJ	17	17	5–12	368	584	63.0	3,897	6.7	71	28	11	4.8	1.9	90.5	22	107	4.9	18	0	40	302	5	2
2025	PIT	16	16	10–6	327	498	65.7	3,322	6.7	80	24	7	4.8	1.4	94.8	21	61	2.9	20	1	29	180	4	1
2026	PIT	9	9	6–3	190	317	59.9	2,014	6.4	80	15	6	4.7	1.9	86.4	14	22	1.6	12	0	26	212	3	0
Career		273	266	169–96–1	5,886	9,060	65.0	68,288	7.5	93	542	129	6.0	1.4	101.6	776	3,656	4.7	35	36	626	4,300	104	42

==== Postseason ====
Postseason
Year	Team	Games			Passing											Rushing					Sacked		Fumbles	
Year	Team	GP	GS	Record	Cmp	Att	Pct	Yds	Y/A	Lng	TD	Int	TD%	Int%	Rtg	Att	Yds	Y/A	Lng	TD	Sck	SckY	Fum	Lost
2007	GB	1	0	—	0	0	—	0	—	0	0	0	—	—	—	0	0	—	0	0	0	0	0	0
2009	GB	1	1	0–1	28	42	66.7	423	**10.1**	44	4	1	**9.5**	2.4	**121.4**	3	13	4.3	13	1	5	19	1	1
2010	GB	4	4	**4–0**	**90**	**132**	68.2	**1,094**	8.3	38	**9**	2	6.8	1.5	109.8	**14**	54	3.9	25	**2**	8	53	2	1
2011	GB	1	1	0–1	26	46	56.5	264	5.7	21	2	1	4.3	2.2	78.5	7	**66**	**9.4**	16	0	4	23	1	1
2012	GB	2	2	1–1	49	72	68.1	531	7.4	44	3	1	4.2	1.4	97.6	5	40	8.0	17	0	4	33	1	**0**
2013	GB	1	1	0–1	17	26	65.4	177	6.8	26	1	**0**	3.8	**0.0**	97.8	2	11	5.5	9	0	4	20	1	**0**
2014	GB	2	2	1–1	43	69	62.3	494	7.2	46	4	2	5.8	2.9	91.1	4	8	2.0	12	0	3	26	2	1
2015	GB	2	2	1–1	45	80	56.3	471	5.9	60	4	1	5.0	1.3	84.9	3	20	6.7	19	0	**2**	**15**	**0**	**0**
2016	GB	3	3	2–1	80	128	62.5	1,004	7.8	42	**9**	2	7.0	1.6	103.8	8	62	7.8	**28**	0	10	79	**0**	**0**
2019	GB	2	2	1–1	47	66	**71.2**	569	8.6	65	4	2	6.1	3.0	104.9	6	14	2.3	14	0	5	38	3	1
2020	GB	2	2	1–1	56	84	66.7	642	7.6	58	5	1	6.0	1.2	104.4	4	−3	−0.8	1	1	5	32	**0**	**0**
2021	GB	1	1	0–1	20	29	69.0	225	7.8	**75**	0	**0**	0.0	**0.0**	91.9	0	0	—	0	0	5	29	1	**0**
2025	PIT	1	1	0–1	17	33	51.5	146	4.4	25	0	1	0.0	3.0	50.8	0	0	—	0	0	4	36	2	1
Career		23	22	11–11	518	807	64.2	6,040	7.5	75	45	14	5.6	1.7	98.1	56	285	5.1	28	4	59	403	14	6

=== College ===
College statistics
Year	Team	Games			Passing								Rushing			
Year	Team	GP	GS	Record	Cmp	Att	Pct	Yds	Avg	TD	Int	Rate	Att	Yds	Avg	TD
2002	Butte	11	11	**10–1**	164	265	61.9	2,408	9.1	28	4	170.1	101	294	2.9	7
2003	California	13	10	7–3	**215**	**349**	61.6	**2,903**	**8.3**	19	5	146.6	**86**	**210**	**2.4**	**5**
2004	California	12	12	10–2	209	316	**66.1**	2,566	8.1	**24**	**8**	**154.4**	74	126	1.7	3
FBS career		25	22	17–5	424	665	63.8	5,469	8.2	43	13	150.3	160	336	2.1	8

== Career highlights ==
=== Awards and honors ===
NFL

- Super Bowl XLV champion
- Super Bowl MVP (XLV)
- 4× NFL Most Valuable Player (2011, 2014, 2020, 2021)
- 4× First-team All-Pro (2011, 2014, 2020, 2021)
- Second-team All-Pro (2012)
- 10× Pro Bowl (2009, 2011, 2012, 2014–2016, 2018–2021)
- 4× NFL passer rating leader (2011, 2012, 2020, 2021)
- 2× NFL passing touchdowns leader (2016, 2020)
- NFL completion percentage leader (2020)
- 3× Total quarterback rating leader: 2011, 2020, 2021
- NFL 2010s All-Decade Team
- Bart Starr Award (2014)
- Bert Bell Award (2011)
- 4× PFWA NFL Most Valuable Player (2011, 2014, 2020, 2021)
- PFWA NFL Offensive Player of the Year: (2011)
- PFWA Good Guy Award (2011)
- NFL Moment of the Year (2015)
- 2× Sporting News Offensive Player of the Year (2011, 2014)
- 2× GMC Never Say Never Award (2013, 2014)
- 3× NFC Offensive Player of the Year (2011, 2014, 2020)
- 3× FedEx Air NFL Player of the Year (2010, 2014, 2020)
- 14× NFL Top 100 — 11th (2011), 1st (2012), 6th (2013), 11th (2014), 2nd (2015), 6th (2016), 6th (2017), 10th (2018), 8th (2019), 16th (2020), 3rd (2021), 3rd (2022), 51st (2023), 92nd (2024)

NCAA

- Insight Bowl Offensive MVP (2003)
- First-team All-Pac-10 (2004)
- California Golden Bears Co-Offensive MVP (2004)

NBA

- 2021 NBA Championship (as minority owner)

Media

- 2011 Associated Press Male Athlete of the Year
- 2011 The Sporting News Athlete of the Year
- 4× ESPY Award winner – Best NFL Player (2011, 2012, 2015, 2017)

State/Local

- The Wisconsin Legislature approved a proposal that declared December 12, 2012 (stylized as 12/12/12) "Aaron Rodgers Day" in honor of Rodgers, whose jersey number with the Packers was 12.

Golf

- 2023 AT&T Pebble Beach Pro Am winner

=== Records ===
==== NFL records ====
Career

- Career passer rating (minimum 1,500 attempts): 102.5
- Career TD–INT ratio (minimum 1,500 attempts): 4.4–1
- Consecutive attempts without an interception (402)
- Fastest to 400 passing touchdowns (193 games)
- Career sacks taken: 600

Single season and games

- Passer rating in a season: 122.5 (2011)
- Lowest interception percentage in a season: 0.3 (2018)
- Consecutive games with a passer rating over 100.0 in a season: 12 (2011)
- Consecutive games with a passer rating over 110.0 in a season: 11 (2011)

==== Green Bay Packers records ====
- Most passing touchdowns (475)
- Career completion percentage (65.3)

== Touchdown celebration ==
Since becoming an NFL starter in 2008, Rodgers has become known for his unique touchdown celebration, which he and his teammates have dubbed the "Championship Belt." After a scoring play, Rodgers celebrates by making a motion as if he is putting an invisible championship belt on around his waist. Teammate Greg Jennings said of the celebration: "It's just something fun that he does. We get excited when we see it cause we know that he's made a play or we've made a play as offense." The gesture drew the praise of WWE wrestler Triple H and has become common for Green Bay fans to mimic during games. He has also celebrated by doing the shoryuken, a jumping uppercut move from the Street Fighter series.

== Alternative medicine advocacy ==
Rodgers has been vocal about his use of alternative medicine, and is a proponent of the legalization of psychedelic drugs. He revealed in 2022 that he had previously made offseason trips to Peru, where he consumed ayahuasca.

=== Views on COVID-19 ===
Rodgers is one of the most prominent American athletes to choose not to get vaccinated against the COVID-19 virus, and was critical of the NFL's health and safety protocols during the COVID-19 pandemic. His stances on the COVID-19 vaccine were criticized by scientists, health officials, and some former players and commentators, due to concerns that Rodgers was spreading vaccine misinformation and potentially was risking the health of his teammates.

During the NFL season, Rodgers frequently appeared on The Pat McAfee Show. One such interview in 2021 made headlines after Rodgers made several false and misleading statements about COVID-19, implying that unvaccinated people were not the group most affected by the pandemic and that ivermectin was beneficial for people with COVID-19. These and similar claims led some reporters to describe Rodgers as a conspiracy theorist.

== Political and social commentary ==
Rodgers has voiced support for Robert F. Kennedy Jr. and his presidential campaign of 2024. Kennedy reportedly included Rodgers on his "short list" of possible vice presidential running mates, along with others, including Jesse Ventura and Nicole Shanahan.

On Adam Breneman's podcast in 2022, former Packers backup quarterback DeShone Kizer said that Rodgers had expressed interest in 9/11 conspiracy theories at one of the first meetings between the two quarterbacks. Kizer described their discussion of conspiracy theories as "a real thought experiment". Rodgers has also promoted the Tartarian architecture conspiracy theory.

In a January 2024 appearance on The Pat McAfee Show, Rodgers, without evidence, implied that comedian Jimmy Kimmel was an acquaintance of disgraced financier and sex offender Jeffrey Epstein, and that Kimmel's name would possibly appear in soon to be released court documents listing Epstein's associates. Kimmel denied the allegations and threatened to sue Rodgers for defamation if he repeated the claim. In a follow-up appearance on McAfee's show the following week, Rodgers stated: "I'm glad that Jimmy is not on the list. I really am. I don't think he's the P-word [pedophile]."

During a February 2024 appearance on the conspiracy-focused Look Into It podcast hosted by Eddie Bravo, Rodgers espoused numerous conspiracy theories on medicine, immigration, and John F. Kennedy. His claims included that AIDS and COVID were created by the government for the sake of pharmaceutical industry profits (see also discredited HIV/AIDS origins theories and Operation Denver).

In 2024, CNN reporter Pamela Brown reported that Rodgers had in 2013 shared false conspiracy theories about the Sandy Hook massacre, claiming that the attack was an "inside job" perpetrated by the government. CNN simultaneously reported an allegation by an anonymous source that Rodgers had several years prior said "Sandy Hook never happened....All those children never existed. They were all actors." In response, Rodgers said, "I am not and have never been of the opinion that the events did not take place" but did not say whether he had ever believed the Sandy Hook massacre was an "inside job."

== Personal life ==
=== Family and relationships ===
Rodgers has two brothers; the younger, Jordan, played quarterback at Vanderbilt University and had a brief NFL career with the Jacksonville Jaguars and Tampa Bay Buccaneers. Although Rodgers and his brothers were raised Christian, in an interview in 2017 he stated that he no longer affiliated himself with any organized religion.

Rodgers is the godfather to the second son of his long-time NFL teammate, Randall Cobb.

Rodgers was in a relationship with actress Olivia Munn from 2014 to 2017 and with former professional racing driver Danica Patrick from 2018 to 2020. He started dating actress Shailene Woodley in the second half of 2020. In an appearance on The Tonight Show Starring Jimmy Fallon in 2021, Woodley confirmed that she was engaged to Rodgers. On February 16, 2022, Rodgers and Woodley called off their engagement.

In December 2024, Rodgers stated he was dating a woman named Brittani. In June 2025, Rodgers stated they had married a few months prior.

=== Honorary memberships and business ventures ===
Rodgers was initiated as an honorary member of Tau Kappa Epsilon (TKE) on January 5, 2012, at the Sigma-Xi Chapter at St. Norbert College.

In April 2018, Rodgers was announced as a limited partner in the Milwaukee Bucks ownership group, making him the first active NFL player with an ownership stake in an NBA franchise. The team later won the NBA Finals in 2021.

== Media appearances ==
Rodgers was a longtime spokesperson for State Farm Insurance and was frequently featured in their commercials. In the commercials, Rodgers often highlights his "Championship Belt" touchdown celebration, which State Farm renamed as the "Discount Double Check". Rodgers has also been featured in Pizza Hut advertisements, as well as numerous local Wisconsin-based advertisements.

In May 2015, Rodgers appeared as a contestant on Celebrity Jeopardy!; he defeated Shark Tank investor Kevin O'Leary and astronaut and future United States Senator Mark Kelly, winning $50,000 for his charity. In April 2021, Rodgers had a two-week stint as guest host on Jeopardy! from April 5–16.

Rodgers has also made numerous cameo appearances on television, including in a 2013 episode of The Office, a 2019 episode of Game of Thrones, and a 2015 episode of the sketch comedy television series Key & Peele. He also taped a cameo as Jeopardy! host for an episode of The Conners.

In 2021, Rodgers took part in The Match IV, which was the fourth installment in the exhibition match play golf series. He was paired with professional golfer Bryson DeChambeau. The team went up against Phil Mickelson and Tom Brady. DeChambeau and Rodgers won the match 3 and 2. Rodgers also took part in the sixth edition of The Match, where he teamed up with Brady against fellow quarterbacks Josh Allen and Patrick Mahomes. Rodgers and Brady defeated Mahomes and Allen 1 up.

== Humanitarian and charitable efforts ==
Rodgers is the founder, and the co-creator, along with David Gruber, of itsAaron, a charity with a mission of "creating awareness for organizations and people who are changing the world".

He is also a supporter of the MACC Fund, Raise Hope for Congo, and other humanitarian and charitable efforts.

Rodgers' Celebrity Jeopardy! win earned $50,000 for the MACC Fund. During his 2021 appearance as Jeopardy! guest host, the show made a charitable donation equal to the cumulative winnings of the contestants (including the runners-up) for those ten shows.

Rodgers is a supporter of his alma mater, University of California, Berkeley. He has donated funds to renovate the athletic facilities and also established an endowed scholarship for transfer students at the school. In 2021, he was honored by the school for his charitable work.

In 2021, Rodgers donated $1 million to help small businesses in Chico and Butte County, California.

In 2024, Rodgers raised $3 million for charities with a flag football tournament.

== See also ==
- List of NFL career quarterback wins leaders
- List of NFL career passer rating leaders
- List of NFL career passing completions leaders
- List of NFL career passing touchdowns leaders
- List of NFL career passing yards leaders
- List of Green Bay Packers first-round draft picks
- List of Green Bay Packers team records
- List of Green Bay Packers starting quarterbacks
- List of New York Jets starting quarterbacks
- List of Pittsburgh Steelers starting quarterbacks
