= Orlando Parker =

American football player (born 1972)

No. 89
- Position: Wide receiver

Personal information
- Born: March 7, 1972 (age 54); Montgomery, Alabama, U.S.
- Listed height: 5 ft 11 in (1.80 m)
- Listed weight: 190 lb (86 kg)

Career information
- High school: Jefferson Davis (Montgomery)
- College: Troy
- NFL draft: 1994: 4th round, 117th overall pick

Career history
- New York Jets (1994)

Career NFL statistics
- Receptions: 1
- Receiving yards: 7
- Stats at Pro Football Reference

Orlando Lateef Parker (born March 7, 1972) is an American former professional football player who was a wide receiver for the New York Jets of the National Football League (NFL) in 1994. He played college football for the Troy Trojans and was selected by the Jets in the fourth round of the 1994 NFL draft with the 117th overall pick.

Parker originally competed for the Auburn Tigers track and field team as a sprinter and played on their football team, but transferred to Troy after he learned he would not be allowed to compete for the Auburn track team any longer.
