= Fake spike =

Trick play in American football

A fake spike is a trick play in American football. When the clock is running low, it is not uncommon for a quarterback to spike the ball to stop the clock, either to set up for the next play or bring on the special teams. Here though, the objective is to trick the defense into believing that no downfield play will be run.

A famous example occurred in 1994 with the Clock Play, when the Miami Dolphins were playing the New York Jets; Dan Marino was attempting to drive for the winning score as quarterback for Miami. From the account of Pat Kirwan, former Jets defensive coach and executive,

With little time left, Marino had driven the Dolphins near our goal line and lined up as if he were going to spike the ball to stop the clock. But instead, he faked the spike, and as our defense let up for a split second, Marino threw the winning touchdown.

Peyton Manning of the Indianapolis Colts was also a frequent user of the fake spike, and "sold it" so well in a 2001 game against the New Orleans Saints that the referee Jeff Triplette blew the whistle to stop the play, costing the Colts a probable touchdown.

Another example of the play occurred in 2022. The Cleveland Browns were driving with less than two minutes remaining against the Carolina Panthers and their quarterback Jacoby Brissett hesitated for a moment, seemingly ready to fake spike and throw to a receiver before he spiked the ball with thirteen seconds left at the 40-yard line. The next play, Cleveland kicked a successful field goal from 58 yards out to win the game 26-24. It was pointed out after the game that the play likely violated Rule 8, Section 2, Article 1, Item 4 of the NFL rulebook, which states that a player cannot spike the ball after "delaying his passing action". The penalty of intentional grounding for spiking the ball after delaying their motion to spike it is a 10-yard penalty with a 10-second runoff; the referee stated after the game that the stepback by Brisett did not constitute a delayed motion (the referees had thrown a flag on the field after the spike but stated there was no foul).
