= 1993 New England Patriots season =

Season of National Football League team the New England Patriots

- Owner: James Orthwein
- Head coach: Bill Parcells
- Home stadium: Foxboro Stadium

Results
- Record: 5–11
- Division place: 4th AFC East
- Playoffs: Did not qualify
- All-Pros: None
- Pro Bowlers: None

Uniform

The 1993 New England Patriots season was the franchise’s 34th season overall and 24th in the National Football League (NFL). The Patriots finished fourth in the AFC East Division with a record of five wins and eleven losses, improving on their 2–14 record from 1992 by more than doubling that season's win total. The Patriots began the 1993 season with a new color scheme, a new head coach, and a new starting quarterback. It began with the team's fourth head coach in five seasons.

This season would mark the last time until 2004 the Patriots played the Seattle Seahawks. The Patriots would not return to Seattle until 2008.

== Offseason ==
=== Sweeping off-field changes ===
The Patriots closed their previous season with a 2–14 record amidst off-field turmoil. An unfavorable stadium deal without parking and luxury box revenues meant that the Patriots could not be competitive financially without a new facility. Owner James Orthwein demanded that Boston build a domed stadium downtown, and NFL Commissioner Paul Tagliabue said that time to build a new stadium was running out. Suspicion that the Patriots would move to St. Louis began during the 1992 season, and intensified as bidding for the league’s two 1995 expansion franchises heated up, (Note: Expansion franchises were awarded to Charlotte, North Carolina as the Carolina Panthers in October 1993 and to Jacksonville, Florida as the Jacksonville Jaguars on the last day of November. Memphis, St. Louis and Baltimore would lose their expansion bids; however, St. Louis would acquire the Rams in 1995 and Art Modell would move the Cleveland Browns to Baltimore as the Ravens in 1996) with the general belief that the Patriots would be moved to St. Louis as the Stallions (Note: In November 1993, a “St. Louis Stallions” team logo was unveiled and hats printed, only to be withdrawn after the city’s expansion bid was lost.) if that city lost its expansion bid. There was also a proposal from businessman Fran Murray to move the team to Hartford, Connecticut where the state legislature backed a plan to build a 65,000-seat stadium downtown.

The 1993 season was the first with the current Patriots logo and font, although the team changed its colors in 2000.

Sweeping changes were made in the organization before the season. All coaches from the 1992 season with the exception of Dante Scarnecchia and Bobby Grier were fired. Scarnecchia would become a special assistant while Grier would move to the front office. The new head coach was Bill Parcells, who had been a linebackers coach in Foxboro in 1980 under Ron Erhardt.

The roster underwent substantial changes; among the holdovers from the 1992 season were Marv Cook, Ben Coates, Kevin Turner, Michael Timpson, Sam Gash, Greg McMurtry, Vincent Brown, Maurice Hurst, Leonard Russell, Bruce Armstrong, Mike Arthur, and Pat Harlow. The Patriots drafted quarterback Drew Bledsoe as the #1 pick and he was named starter.

Additions	Subtractions
QB Scott Secules (Dolphins)	QB Hugh Millen (Cowboys)
DE Aaron Jones (Steelers)	RB John Stephens (Packers)
G Rich Baldinger (Chiefs)	WR Irving Fryar (Dolphins)
DE Mike Pitts (Eagles)	WR Walter Stanley (CFL)
C Bill Lewis (Cardinals)	
P Mike Saxon (Cowboys)	

=== 1993 NFL draft ===
1993 New England Patriots draft
Round	Pick	Player	Position	College	Notes
1	1	Drew Bledsoe *	Quarterback	Washington State	
2	31	Chris Slade *	Defensive end	Virginia	
2	51	Todd Rucci	Tackle	Penn State	
2	56	Vincent Brisby	Wide receiver	Northeast Louisiana	
4	86	Kevin Johnson	Defensive tackle	Texas Southern	
4	110	Corwin Brown	Safety	Michigan	
5	113	Scott Sisson	Kicker	Georgia Tech	
5	138	Rich Griffith	Tight end	Arizona	
6	142	Lawrence Hatch	Cornerback	Florida	
8	198	Troy Brown *	Wide receiver	Marshall	
Made roster * Made at least one Pro Bowl during career

=== Undrafted free agents ===
1993 undrafted free agents of note
Player	Position	College
Arnold Ale	Linebacker	UCLA
Keith Ballard	Offensive Line	Minnesota
Matt Bomba	Defensive Line	Indiana
Tunji Bolden	Linebacker	TCU
Ray Crittenden	Wide receiver	Virginia Tech
Corey Croom	Running back	Ball State
Eric Gallon	Running back	Kansas State
Bo Gilliard	Wide receiver	Prairie View A&M
Frank Godfrey	Offensive Line	LSU
Ronnie Harris	Wide receiver	Oregon
Vernon Lewis	Cornerback	Pittsburgh
Tom Vincent	Offensive Line	Vanderbilt

== Season summary ==
The Patriots lost their first four games, even after forcing overtime against the Lions and seeing a last-minute field goal attempt against Seattle bounce off the crossbar. In Week 5 Bledsoe was injured, Scott Secules was named the starting quarterback, and won the game with two passing touchdowns passing and one rushing score in the team's 23–21 win over the Cardinals. Scott Secules was then benched after a 28–14 loss to the Oilers. Bledsoe started for the Patriots, who however lost seven straight before eking out a 7–2 win against the Bengals that was the last occurrence until the 2011 Falcons of a team scoring only a safety in an NFL game. This win was followed by a 20–17 win over the Cleveland Browns – coached by Parcells’ longtime assistant Bill Belichick – and a 38–0 massacre of the Indianapolis Colts in brutal windchill.

The season ended on January 2, 1994, with many in the sellout crowd at Foxboro Stadium believing it would be the final ever game for the New England Patriots before moving to St. Louis. The finale itself became one of the most dramatic games in the team’s history. The Patriots were hosting the Dolphins, who with champion quarterback Dan Marino out for the season after Week Five, had not won since Thanksgiving Day against the Dallas Cowboys and required a win to make the playoffs. The Patriots led 10–7 at halftime and twice stopped the Dolphins on downs, but early in the third a Bledsoe fumble led to a Dolphins field goal. A blocked punt by the Dolphins’ Darrell Malone led to a touchdown by Scott Mitchell to Mark Ingram. The game lead tied or changed five times in the fourth quarter. In the fourth the Dolphins completed a drive ending in a Terry Kirby touchdown run, this despite Andre Tippett's sack of Mitchell for a ten-yard loss – it was the 100th career sack for the future Hall Of Fame linebacker.

In the final 3:40 Bledsoe drove the Patriots down to a Ben Coates touchdown catch, but the Dolphins forced overtime on a Pete Stoyanovich field goal. In the overtime the Dolphins punted after Chris Slade forced a fumble, then Bledsoe was picked off by J.B. Brown before the Dolphins had to punt again. Vincent Brisby caught a ten-yard pass but fumbled; teammate Leonard Russell recovered the ball and ran 22 yards; Bledsoe then absorbed a Dolphins blitz and launched a 36-yard touchdown to Michael Timpson, ending a wild 33–27 Patriots win. This finished their season at 5–11, but with four straight wins and eliminating the Dolphins from the playoffs as a finale.

This win over Miami marked only the sixth time that the Pats had defeated a team with a winning record since the start of 1989.

=== Staying in Foxborough ===
As it turned out, the Patriots would not be leaving for the Midwest after all. Despite owner James Orthwein’s best efforts, Foxboro Stadium owner Robert Kraft was unwilling to let the team out of its lease, which ran through the end of the 2001 season. An effort by Orthwein to buy his way out of the terms of the lease was rejected outright by Kraft; since Orthwein had intended to relocate the Patriots when he purchased the team from Victor Kiam before the previous season, and Kraft said he would challenge any relocation bid in court, he was left with little choice but to put the team up for sale since he no longer desired to do business in New England. Kraft would make a bid for the franchise that would eventually be accepted, and the Patriots remained in Foxborough.

== Staff ==
1993 New England Patriots staff
Front office: Chairman of the Board – James Orthwein; Vice Chairman of the Board – Michael O'Hallaron; Executive Vice President of Football Operations – Patrick Forte; Vice President – Bucko Kilroy; Director of College Scouting – Charley Armey; Director of Pro Scouting – Bobby Grier; Head coaches: Head Coach – Bill Parcells; Offensive coaches: Offensive Coordinator – Ray Perkins; Running Backs – Dave Atkins; Wide Receivers – Chris Palmer; Tight Ends – Charlie Weis; Offensive Line – Fred Hoaglin	Defensive coaches: Defensive Coordinator/Linebackers – Al Groh; Defensive Line – Romeo Crennel; Defensive Backs – Bob Trott; Special teams coaches: Special Teams – Mike Sweatman; Special Assistant – Dante Scarnecchia; Strength and conditioning: Strength and Conditioning – Johnny Parker

== Roster ==
1993 New England Patriots roster
Quarterbacks (QB): 11 Drew Bledsoe; 10 Scott Secules; 16 Scott Zolak; Running backs (RB): 26 Corey Croom; 33 Sam Gash FB; 35 Burnie Legette FB; 32 Leonard Russell; 34 Kevin Turner FB; Wide receivers (WR): 82 Vincent Brisby; 81 Ray Crittenden KR; 84 Ronnie Harris; 86 Greg McMurtry; 83 Michael Timpson; Tight ends (TE): 87 Ben Coates; 85 Marv Cook; 88 Rich Griffith	Offensive linemen (OL): 78 Bruce Armstrong T; 65 Mike Arthur C; 74 Rich Baldinger G; 69 Eugene Chung G; 63 Mike Gisler G; 77 Pat Harlow T; 75 Bill Lewis C; 70 Brandon Moore T; 74 Doug Skene G; 66 Mark Staten T; Defensive linemen (DL): 92 Ray Agnew; 72 Tim Goad NT; 90 Bryan Hooks DE; 98 Mario Johnson NT; 97 Aaron Jones DE; 93 Mike Pitts DE; 76 John Washington DE; 96 Brent Williams DE	Linebackers (LB): 52 David Bavaro ILB; 59 Vincent Brown ILB; 54 Todd Collins ILB; 95 Dwayne Sabb OLB; 53 Chris Slade OLB; 56 Andre Tippett OLB; 51 David White OLB; Defensive backs (DB): 42 Harlon Barnett FS; 30 Corwin Brown SS; 37 Maurice Hurst CB; 28 Dion Lambert FS; 43 Vernon Lewis CB; 23 Terry Ray S; 22 Rod Smith CB; 21 Reyna Thompson CB; 27 Darryl Wren CB; Special teams (ST): 3 Matt Bahr K; 7 Mike Saxon P; 9 Scott Sisson K	Practice squad None Reserve: 80 Troy Brown (IR); 99 Jason Carthen LB (IR); 71 Todd Rucci G (IR); 53 active, 3 inactive, 0 practice squad Rookies in italics

== Regular season ==
=== Schedule ===
Week	Date	Opponent	Result	Record	Venue	Attendance
1	September 5	at **Buffalo Bills**	**L** 14–38	0–1	Rich Stadium	79,751
2	September 12	Detroit Lions	**L** 16–19 (OT)	0–2	Foxboro Stadium	54,151
3	September 19	Seattle Seahawks	**L** 14–17	0–3	Foxboro Stadium	50,392
4	September 26	at **New York Jets**	**L** 7–45	0–4	Giants Stadium	64,836
5	Bye					
6	October 10	at Phoenix Cardinals	**W** 23–21	1–4	Sun Devil Stadium	36,115
7	October 17	Houston Oilers	**L** 14–28	1–5	Foxboro Stadium	51,037
8	October 24	at Seattle Seahawks	**L** 9–10	1–6	Kingdome	56,526
9	October 31	at **Indianapolis Colts**	**L** 6–9	1–7	Hoosier Dome	46,522
10	November 7	**Buffalo Bills**	**L** 10–13 (OT)	1–8	Foxboro Stadium	54,326
11	Bye					
12	November 21	at **Miami Dolphins**	**L** 13–17	1–9	Joe Robbie Stadium	59,982
13	November 28	**New York Jets**	**L** 0–6	1–10	Foxboro Stadium	42,810
14	December 5	at Pittsburgh Steelers	**L** 14–17	1–11	Three Rivers Stadium	51,358
15	December 12	Cincinnati Bengals	**W** 7–2	2–11	Foxboro Stadium	29,794
16	December 19	at Cleveland Browns	**W** 20–17	3–11	Cleveland Browns Stadium	48,618
17	December 26	**Indianapolis Colts**	**W** 38–0	4–11	Foxboro Stadium	26,571
18	January 2	**Miami Dolphins**	**W** 33–27 (OT)	5–11	Foxboro Stadium	53,883
Note: Intra-division opponents are in **bold** text.

=== Standings ===
AFC East
	W	L	T	PCT	PF	PA	STK
^{(1)} Buffalo Bills	12	4	0	.750	329	242	W4
Miami Dolphins	9	7	0	.563	349	351	L5
New York Jets	8	8	0	.500	270	247	L3
New England Patriots	5	11	0	.313	238	286	W4
Indianapolis Colts	4	12	0	.250	189	378	L4
