= 1995 NFL season =

American football season

Regular season
- Duration: September 3 – December 25, 1995

Playoffs
- Start date: December 30, 1995
- AFC Champions: Pittsburgh Steelers
- NFC Champions: Dallas Cowboys

Super Bowl XXX
- Date: January 28, 1996
- Site: Sun Devil Stadium, Tempe, Arizona
- Champions: Dallas Cowboys

Pro Bowl
- Date: February 4, 1996
- Site: Aloha Stadium

AFC teams: West, Central, East
NFC teams: West, Central, East

The 1995 NFL season was the 76th regular season of the National Football League (NFL). The league expanded to 30 teams with the addition of the Carolina Panthers and the Jacksonville Jaguars. The two expansion teams were slotted into the two remaining divisions that previously had only four teams (while the other four had five teams): the AFC Central (Jaguars) and the NFC West (Panthers).

Meanwhile, the two teams in Los Angeles relocated to other cities: the Rams transferred to St. Louis and the Raiders moved back to Oakland; this would be the start of a 20-year absence for the NFL in Los Angeles. During the course of the season it emerged that the Cleveland Browns would relocate to Baltimore for the 1996 season. The Raiders' move was not announced until after the schedule had been announced, which resulted in a problem in the third week of the season when both the Raiders and the San Francisco 49ers had games scheduled to air on NBC which ended up overlapping each other. The Raiders game was rescheduled for 10:00 a.m. PDT in case they were to relocate and NBC was given the doubleheader so that both Bay Area teams had their games televised locally.

The season ended with Super Bowl XXX, when the Dallas Cowboys defeated the Pittsburgh Steelers 27–17 at Sun Devil Stadium. They became the first team in NFL history to win three Super Bowls in four years. This season was Miami Dolphins head coach Don Shula's last season as coach.

== Player movement ==
=== Transactions ===
- July 27: The Tampa Bay Buccaneers signed linebacker Tommy Thigpen
- July 27: The Miami Dolphins signed Defensive End Steve Emtman
- July 29: The New York Giants signed Jessie Armstead
- July 29: The Indianapolis Colts signed wide receiver Wendell Davis

=== Retirements ===
- April 18, 1995: Four-time Super Bowl champion quarterback Joe Montana announced his retirement. He spent the last two seasons of his career with the Kansas City Chiefs.

=== Draft ===
The 1995 NFL draft was held from April 22 to 23, 1995, at New York City's Theater at Madison Square Garden. With the first pick, the Cincinnati Bengals selected running back Ki-Jana Carter from Penn State University.

=== Expansion draft ===
The 1995 NFL expansion draft was held on February 15, 1995. The Jacksonville Jaguars held the first pick overall, while the Carolina Panthers were second, alternating picks as the existing teams made six players available for selection. The Panthers ultimately picked 35 players, while the Jaguars picked 31. With the first selection in the expansion draft, the Jaguars selected quarterback Steve Beuerlein from the Arizona Cardinals. Selecting second, the Panthers obtained cornerback Rod Smith from the New England Patriots.

== New referees ==
Mike Carey and Walt Coleman were promoted to referee; Carey became the second African-American referee in NFL history following Johnny Grier, who was promoted in 1988. Dale Hamer had to sit out the 1995 season to recover from open heart surgery, while league expansion from 28 to 30 teams required an additional officiating crew.

== Major rule changes ==
- An eligible receiver forced out of bounds by a defensive player may return to the field and automatically become eligible to legally be the first player to touch a forward pass.
- Quarterbacks may now receive communications from the bench from a small radio receiver in their helmets, partly repealing a rule that had been in force since 1956. They are also allowed to spike the ball immediately after snap to save time that is running.

== Preseason ==
=== American Bowl ===
A series of National Football League pre-season exhibition games that were held at sites outside the United States. Two games were contested in 1995.

Date	Winning team	Score	Losing team	Score	Stadium	City
August 6, 1995	Denver Broncos	24	San Francisco 49ers	10	Tokyo Dome	(Japan) Tokyo
August 12, 1995	Buffalo Bills	9	Dallas Cowboys	7	SkyDome	(Canada) Toronto

=== Hall of Fame Game ===
The Pro Football Hall of Fame Game featured the NFL's newest expansions teams, as the Carolina Panthers defeated the Jacksonville Jaguars 20–14, was played on July 29, and held at Tom Benson Hall of Fame Stadium in Canton, Ohio, the same city where the league was founded. The 1995 Hall of Fame Class included Jim Finks, Henry Jordan, Steve Largent, Lee Roy Selmon and Kellen Winslow

== Regular season ==
=== Scheduling formula ===
With the addition of Carolina and Jacksonville to give each division five teams, the "fifth place" schedule given to the last-place teams in the AFC East, AFC West, NFC East and NFC Central from 1978 to 1994 was eliminated.

Inter-conference
AFC East vs NFC West
AFC Central vs NFC Central
AFC West vs NFC East

Highlights of the 1995 season included:

- Thanksgiving: Two games were played on Thursday, November 23, featuring the Minnesota Vikings at Detroit and Kansas City Chiefs at Dallas, with Detroit and Dallas winning.
- Snowball Game (1995): In the final weekend of the season, the New York Giants hosted the San Diego Chargers. Giants fans threw snowballs onto the field throughout the contest. This action resulted in 15 arrests and the ejection of 175 fans from Giants Stadium; San Diego posted a 27–17 victory in what became known as the "Snowball Game".

=== Final standings ===
AFC East
	W	L	T	PCT	PF	PA	STK
^{(3)} Buffalo Bills	10	6	0	.625	350	335	L1
^{(5)} Indianapolis Colts	9	7	0	.563	331	316	W1
^{(6)} Miami Dolphins	9	7	0	.563	398	332	W1
New England Patriots	6	10	0	.375	294	377	L2
New York Jets	3	13	0	.188	233	384	L4

AFC Central
	W	L	T	PCT	PF	PA	STK
^{(2)} Pittsburgh Steelers	11	5	0	.688	407	327	L1
Cincinnati Bengals	7	9	0	.438	349	374	W1
Houston Oilers	7	9	0	.438	348	324	W2
Cleveland Browns	5	11	0	.313	289	356	L1
Jacksonville Jaguars	4	12	0	.250	275	404	W1

AFC West
	W	L	T	PCT	PF	PA	STK
^{(1)} Kansas City Chiefs	13	3	0	.813	358	241	W2
^{(4)} San Diego Chargers	9	7	0	.563	321	323	W5
Seattle Seahawks	8	8	0	.500	363	366	L1
Denver Broncos	8	8	0	.500	388	345	W1
Oakland Raiders	8	8	0	.500	348	332	L6

NFC East
	W	L	T	PCT	PF	PA	STK
^{(1)} Dallas Cowboys	12	4	0	.750	435	291	W2
^{(4)} Philadelphia Eagles	10	6	0	.625	318	338	L1
Washington Redskins	6	10	0	.375	326	359	W2
New York Giants	5	11	0	.313	290	340	L2
Arizona Cardinals	4	12	0	.250	275	422	L4

NFC Central
	W	L	T	PCT	PF	PA	STK
^{(3)} Green Bay Packers	11	5	0	.688	404	314	W2
^{(5)} Detroit Lions	10	6	0	.625	436	336	W7
Chicago Bears	9	7	0	.563	392	360	W2
Minnesota Vikings	8	8	0	.500	412	385	L2
Tampa Bay Buccaneers	7	9	0	.438	238	335	L2

NFC West
	W	L	T	PCT	PF	PA	STK
^{(2)} San Francisco 49ers	11	5	0	.688	457	258	L1
^{(6)} Atlanta Falcons	9	7	0	.563	362	349	W1
St. Louis Rams	7	9	0	.438	309	418	L3
Carolina Panthers	7	9	0	.438	289	325	L1
New Orleans Saints	7	9	0	.438	319	348	W1

=== Tiebreakers ===
- Indianapolis finished ahead of Miami in the AFC East based on head-to-head sweep (2–0).
- San Diego was the first AFC Wild Card based on head-to-head victory over Indianapolis (1–0).
- Cincinnati finished ahead of Houston in the AFC Central based on better division record (4–4 to Oilers' 3–5).
- Seattle finished ahead of Denver and Oakland in the AFC West based on best head-to-head record (3–1 to Broncos' 2–2 and Raiders' 1–3).
- Denver finished ahead of Oakland in the AFC West based on head-to-head sweep (2–0).
- Philadelphia was the first NFC Wild Card ahead of Detroit based on better conference record (9–3 to Lions' 7–5).
- San Francisco was the second NFC playoff seed ahead of Green Bay based on better conference record (8–4 to Packers' 7–5).
- Atlanta was the third NFC Wild Card ahead of Chicago based on better record against common opponents (4–2 to Bears' 3–3).
- St. Louis finished ahead of Carolina and New Orleans in the NFC West based on best head-to-head record (3–1 to Panthers' 1–3 and Saints' 2–2).
- Carolina finished ahead of New Orleans in the NFC West based on better conference record (4–8 to 3–9).

== Playoffs ==
Dec 31 – Lambeau Field	Jan 6 – 3Com Park
6	Atlanta	20
3	Green Bay	27
3	Green Bay	37	Jan 14 – Texas Stadium
2	San Francisco	17
NFC
Dec 30 – Veterans Stadium	3	Green Bay	27
Jan 7 – Texas Stadium
1	Dallas	38
5	Detroit	37	NFC Championship
4	Philadelphia	11
4	Philadelphia	58	Jan 28 – Sun Devil Stadium
1	Dallas	30
Wild Card playoffs
Divisional playoffs
Dec 31 – Jack Murphy Stadium	N1	Dallas	27
Jan 7 – Arrowhead Stadium
A2	Pittsburgh	17
5	Indianapolis	35	Super Bowl XXX
5	Indianapolis	10
4	San Diego	20	Jan 14 – Three Rivers Stadium
1	Kansas City	7
AFC
Dec 30 – Rich Stadium	5	Indianapolis	16
Jan 6 – Three Rivers Stadium
2	Pittsburgh	20
6	Miami	22	AFC Championship
3	Buffalo	21
3	Buffalo	37
2	Pittsburgh	40

== Milestones ==
The following players set all-time records during the season:

Most touchdowns, season	Emmitt Smith, Dallas (25)
Most passing attempts, career	Dan Marino, Miami (6,531 at the end of the season)
Most passes completed, career	Dan Marino, Miami (3,913 at the end of the season)
Most passing yards, career	Dan Marino, Miami (48,841 at the end of the season)
Most touchdown passes, career	Dan Marino, Miami (352 at the end of the season)
Most pass receptions, career	Jerry Rice, San Francisco (942 at the end of the season)
Most pass receiving yards gained, career	Jerry Rice, San Francisco (15,123 at the end of the season)

== Statistical leaders ==
=== Team ===
Points scored	San Francisco 49ers (457)
Total yards gained	Detroit Lions (6,113)
Yards rushing	Kansas City Chiefs (2,222)
Yards passing	San Francisco 49ers (4,608)
Fewest points allowed	Kansas City Chiefs (241)
Fewest total yards allowed	San Francisco 49ers (4,398)
Fewest rushing yards allowed	San Francisco 49ers (1,061)
Fewest passing yards allowed	New York Jets (2,740)

=== Individual ===
Scoring	Emmitt Smith, Dallas (150 points)
Touchdowns	Emmitt Smith, Dallas (25 TDs)
Most field goals made	Norm Johnson, Pittsburgh (34 FGs)
Rushing	Emmitt Smith, Dallas (1,773 yards)
Passing	Jim Harbaugh, Indianapolis (100.7 rating)
Passing touchdowns	Brett Favre, Green Bay (38 TDs)
Pass receiving	Herman Moore, Detroit (123 catches)
Pass receiving yards	Jerry Rice, San Francisco (1,848)
Punt returns	David Palmer, Minnesota (13.2 average yards)
Kickoff returns	Ron Carpenter, New York Jets (27.7 average yards)
Interceptions	Orlando Thomas, Minnesota (9)
Punting	Rick Tuten, Seattle (45.0 average yards)
Sacks	Bryce Paup, Buffalo (17.5)

The 1995 season produced four of the top twenty highest single-season totals for receiving yards. Two of the top five teams receiving yard totals of all time – Jerry Rice's 1,848 & Isaac Bruce's 1,781 – were recorded in 1995. Detroit Lions receiver Herman Moore gained 1,686 yards (6th highest all time) and Dallas Cowboys receiver Michael Irvin gained 1,603 yards (11th most in NFL history).

== Awards ==
Most Valuable Player	Brett Favre, quarterback, Green Bay
Coach of the Year	Ray Rhodes, Philadelphia
Offensive Player of the Year	Brett Favre, quarterback, Green Bay
Defensive Player of the Year	Bryce Paup, linebacker, Buffalo
Offensive Rookie of the Year	Curtis Martin, running back, New England
Defensive Rookie of the Year	Hugh Douglas, defensive end, New York Jets
NFL Comeback Player of the Year	Jim Harbaugh, quarterback, Indianapolis and Garrison Hearst, running back, Arizona
NFL Man of the Year Award	Boomer Esiason, quarterback, NY Jets
Super Bowl most valuable player	Larry Brown, cornerback, Dallas

== Coaching changes ==
=== Offseason ===
- Denver Broncos: Mike Shanahan replaced the fired Wade Phillips
- Carolina Panthers: Dom Capers became this expansion team's first head coach.
- Houston Oilers: Jeff Fisher became the permanent head coach. Fisher served as interim for the final six games of 1994 after Jack Pardee was fired.
- Jacksonville Jaguars: Tom Coughlin became this expansion team's first head coach.
- Oakland Raiders: Mike White replaced the fired Art Shell for the Raiders' first season since returning to Oakland.
- Philadelphia Eagles: Ray Rhodes replaced the fired Rich Kotite.
- New York Jets: Rich Kotite replaced the fired Pete Carroll.
- Seattle Seahawks: Dennis Erickson replaced the fired Tom Flores.
- St. Louis Rams: Rich Brooks replaced the fired Chuck Knox for the Rams's first season in St. Louis.

=== In-season ===
- Buffalo Bills: Elijah Pitts served as interim for three games while Marv Levy recovered from prostate cancer surgery.

== Stadium changes ==
- Carolina Panthers: The expansion Panthers played their first season at Memorial Stadium in Clemson, South Carolina while their new stadium in Charlotte, North Carolina remained under construction
- Green Bay Packers: This is the first season since 1932 that the Packers played full time in Green Bay, no longer playing select games in Milwaukee
- Jacksonville Jaguars: The expansion Jaguars moved into Jacksonville Municipal Stadium on the site of the former Gator Bowl Stadium
- Oakland Raiders: The relocated Raiders moved back from the Los Angeles Memorial Coliseum to the Oakland–Alameda County Coliseum
- St. Louis Rams: The relocated Rams initially moved from Anaheim Stadium to Busch Memorial Stadium in St. Louis. The Trans World Dome then opened for their fifth regular season home game, with Trans World Airlines acquiring the naming rights
- San Francisco 49ers: Candlestick Park was renamed 3Com Park after the digital electronics manufacturer 3Com acquired the naming rights

== Uniform changes ==
- The inaugural Carolina Panthers uniforms featured gray helmets, blue trim, black jerseys with white numbers and gray pants, and white jerseys with black numbers and white pants. The helmet logo featured a black panther head with blue trim.
- The Dallas Cowboys wore a navy blue version of the white "Double-Star" alternate jerseys they wore in 1994, with blue sleeves and white star logos on the shoulders. The white "Double Star" jersey was discontinued due to a since-repealed NFL policy which allowed teams only one colored jersey and one white jersey except for special occasions.
- The Houston Oilers began wearing their white pants with their white jerseys, discontinuing their blue pants. This was the first time the Oilers wore white pants with white jerseys for a full season since 1980.
- The Indianapolis Colts experimented with wearing blue pants with their white jerseys for their first three games.
- The inaugural Jacksonville Jaguars uniforms featured black helmets, teal jerseys with white numbers, white jerseys with teal numbers, and white pants. The helmet logo featured a jaguar head with a teal tongue.
- The New England Patriots switched from block numbers to a rounded number font with a drop shadow. The "Flying Elvis" helmet logo was repeated on the shoulders, and TV numbers moved to the sleeves.
- The New York Jets removed the black trim from the nameplates on jerseys.
- The Philadelphia Eagles removed the black trim from their jersey numbers and nameplates.
- The St. Louis Rams removed the gold striping on their blue socks. Home Games featured a patch celebrating the Rams inaugural season.

== Deaths ==
=== January ===
- January 27- Bob Chandler, age 45. Played Wide Receiver for the Buffalo Bills and Oakland Raiders from 1971 to 1982. Was a member of the Raiders squad that won Super Bowl XV.

=== February ===
- February 22- Jim Katcavage, age 60. Played Defensive Line and end for the New York Giants from 1956 to 1968.

=== March ===
- March 24- Chet Mutryn, age 74. Played Halfback and Defensive Back for the Buffalo Bisons and Baltimore Colts from 1946 to 1950.

=== April ===
- April 26- Bruce Bosley, age 61. Played Center for the San Francisco 49ers and Atlanta Falcons from 1956 to 1969.

=== May ===
- May 22- Butch Morse, age 84. Played receiver for the Detroit Lions from 1935 to 1940.
- May 23- Danny Fortmann, age 79. Two way player who played Guard and linebacker for the Chicago Bears from 1936 to 1943. Inducted into the pro football hall of fame in 1965.

=== July ===
- July 17- George Kavel, age 85. Played running back for the Philadelphia Eagles in 1934.

=== August ===
- August 8- George Svendsen, age 82. Played center for the Green Bay Packers from 1935 to 1941.
- August 29- Al Akins, age 74. Two-way player who played defensive back and running back for Cleveland Browns and Brooklyn Dodgers from 1946 to 1948.

=== September ===
- September 8- Lin Houston, age 74. Played guard for Cleveland Browns from 1946 to 1953.

=== October ===
- October 2- John Ayers, age 42. Played guard for the San Francisco 49ers and Denver Broncos from 1977 to 1987. Won two Super Bowls as a member of the 49ers.

=== November ===
- November 1- Rocco Canale, age 75. Played offensive guard for the Philadelphia Eagles and Boston Yanks from 1943 to 1947.

=== December ===
December 6- Gerry Cowhig, age 74. Played Linebacker and Running back for Los Angeles Rams, Chicago Cardinals and Philadelphia Eagles from 1947 to 1951.

== Television ==
This was the second year under the league's four-year broadcast contracts with ABC, Fox, NBC, TNT, and ESPN. ABC, Fox, and NBC continued to televise Monday Night Football, the NFC package, the AFC package, respectively. Sunday night games aired on TNT during the first half of the season, and ESPN during the second half of the season.

NBC renamed its pregame show as simply The NFL on NBC. The then-recently retired quarterback Joe Montana joined the show as an analyst, alongside Greg Gumbel, Mike Ditka, and Joe Gibbs. Phil Simms and Paul Maguire joined Dick Enberg as NBC's lead broadcast team, replacing Bob Trumpy.

Verne Lundquist replaced Gary Bender as TNT's play-by-play announcer. TNT also renamed its pregame show as Pro Football Tonight, with Vince Cellini as its host.
