= Eppie Barney =

American football player (born 1944)

No. 87
- Position: Wide receiver

Personal information
- Born: March 20, 1944; Birmingham, Alabama, U.S.
- Died: January 21, 2004 (aged 59)
- Listed height: 6 ft 0 in (1.83 m)
- Listed weight: 201 lb (91 kg)

Career information
- High school: Collinwood (Cleveland, Ohio)
- College: Iowa State (1963-1966)
- NFL draft: 1967: 3rd round, 72nd overall pick

Career history
- Cleveland Browns (1967–1968)

Awards and highlights
- Second-team All-American (1966); 2× First-team All-Big Eight (1965, 1966)

Career NFL statistics
- Receptions: 19
- Receiving yards: 192
- Receiving touchdowns: 1
- Stats at Pro Football Reference

Eppie L. Barney Jr. (March 20, 1944 – January 21, 2004) was an American professional football player who was a wide receiver for the Cleveland Browns of the National Football League (NFL). He played college football for the Iowa State Cyclones.

Eppie solidified himself as one of the finest receivers in Iowa State University history during his tenure from 1964 to 1966. Barney, who switched from tailback to receiver prior to his junior season, ended his impressive career as a two-time first-team all-Big Eight pick and All-American (1966). He graduated as the Big Eight's record-holder in four receiving categories.

A native of Cleveland, Ohio, Barney was recruited by Hall of Fame coach Clay Stapleton to succeed All-American tailbacks Tom Watkins and Tom Vaughn in the Cyclones' potent single-wing attack. At 6' 2" and 203 pounds, Barney had great size and natural athletic ability. He was clocked in the 100-yard dash at 9.8 seconds and high jumped 6-4 as a freshman on the track & field team.

After sitting out his freshman year under NCAA rules, Barney saw action at tailback in his sophomore campaign (1964), gaining 43 yards on 24 carries. He also contributed as a defensive back, intercepting two passes, and as a punt returner, running back six kicks for 39 yards.

The Cyclones were primarily a ground-oriented squad in Stapleton's early reign as the ISU mentor. Stapleton, who switched his offense to a wing-T formation, saw enough promise in Barney to move him to the end spot for his junior campaign while incorporating more pass plays into the offense.

The move wasn't completely smooth. Barney had a tendency to drop passes, but with his off-the-charts athleticism, he was a threat on every play. He still produced an outstanding year in 1965, catching 35 passes for 495 yards, good enough to lead the league in receiving while earning first-team all-Big Eight accolades. ISU went 5-4-1 that year, a significant improvement from a 1-8-1 mark the previous season.

With a year at receiver, Barney was ready to take over as one of the nation's best in 1966. To achieve this goal, he needed a strong battery mate. He had one in senior quarterback Tim Van Galder, who was setting school records of his own. Van Galder and Barney teamed up to form the best pass-catching tandem in the Big Eight for the second consecutive year, as Van Galder led the league in passing (1,645 yards) and Barney paced the league in receiving (782 yards).

Barney broke the ISU and Big Eight marks in single-season receiving yards (782) and receptions (56) to earn first-team all-Big Eight and second-team All-America honors in 1966. His biggest game occurred at Arizona, where he hauled in a then-Big Eight record 11 catches for 175 yards. That performance still stands as the seventh-best single-game receiving yardage effort in school history. Barney ended his career with 97 receptions, a long-standing Big Eight mark that still ranks 10th in school history.

Barney participated in the Blue-Gray Bowl and Senior Bowl before getting selected in the third round of the NFL draft by his hometown Cleveland Browns. Barney played two seasons with the Browns (1967, 1968). He caught 18 passes for 189 yards and one touchdown in 1968.
