= 1966 All-Big Eight Conference football team =

American all-star college football team

The 1966 All-Big Eight Conference football team consists of American football players chosen by various organizations for All-Big Eight Conference teams for the 1966 NCAA University Division football season. The selectors for the 1966 season included the Associated Press (AP).

== Offensive selections ==
=== Ends ===
- Eppie Barney, Iowa State (AP-1)
- Ben Hart, Oklahoma (AP-1)
- Dave Jones, Kansas State (AP-2)
- Dennis Morrison, Nebraska (AP-2)

=== Tackles ===
- Ed Hall, Oklahoma (AP-1)
- J. B. Christian, Oklahoma State (AP-1)
- Mike Montler, Colorado (AP-2)
- Bob Pickens, Nebraska (AP-2)

=== Guards ===
- John Beard, Colorado (AP-1)
- LaVerne Allers, Nebraska (AP-1)
- Kirk Tracy, Colorado (AP-2)
- Alan Pepper, Missouri (AP-2)

=== Centers ===
- Kelly Peterson, Nebraska (AP-1)
- Bill Wohlford, Kansas (AP-2)

=== Backs ===
- Bob Churchich, Nebraska (AP-1)
- Cornelius Davis, Kansas State (AP-1)
- Wilmer Crooks, Colorado (AP-1)
- Tim Van Galder, Iowa State (AP-2)
- Charlie Brown, Missouri (AP-2)
- Donnie Shanklin, Kansas (AP-2)
- Billy Harris, Colorado (AP-2)

== Defensive selections ==
=== Defensive ends ===
- Bill Fairband, Colorado (AP-1)
- Dan Schuppan, Missouri (AP-1)
- Sam Harris, Colorado (AP-2)
- John Zook, Kansas (AP-2)

=== Defensive tackles ===
- Dennis Randall, Oklahoma State (AP-1)
- Carel Stith, Nebraska (AP-1)
- Frank Bosch, Colorado (AP-2)
- Bill Powell, Missouri (AP-2)

=== Middle guards ===
- Wayne Meylan, Nebraska (AP-1)
- Granville Liggins, Oklahoma (AP-2)

=== Linebackers ===
- Mike Sweatman, Kansas (AP-1)
- Danny Lankas, Kansas State (AP-1)
- Lynn Senkbeil, Nebraska (AP-2)
- Kerry Mottl, Colorado (AP-2)

=== Defensive backs ===
- Eugene Ross, Oklahoma (AP-1)
- Jim Whitaker, Missouri (AP-1)
- Hale Irwin, Colorado (AP-1)
- Larry Wachholtz, Nebraska (AP-1)
- Harry Cheatwood, Oklahoma State (AP-2)
- Larry Carwell, Iowa State (AP-2)
- Bob Stephenson, Oklahoma (AP-2)
- Garry Grossnickle, Missouri (AP-2)

== Key ==
AP = Associated Press

== See also ==
- 1966 College Football All-America Team
