= Granville Liggins =

American football player (born 1946)

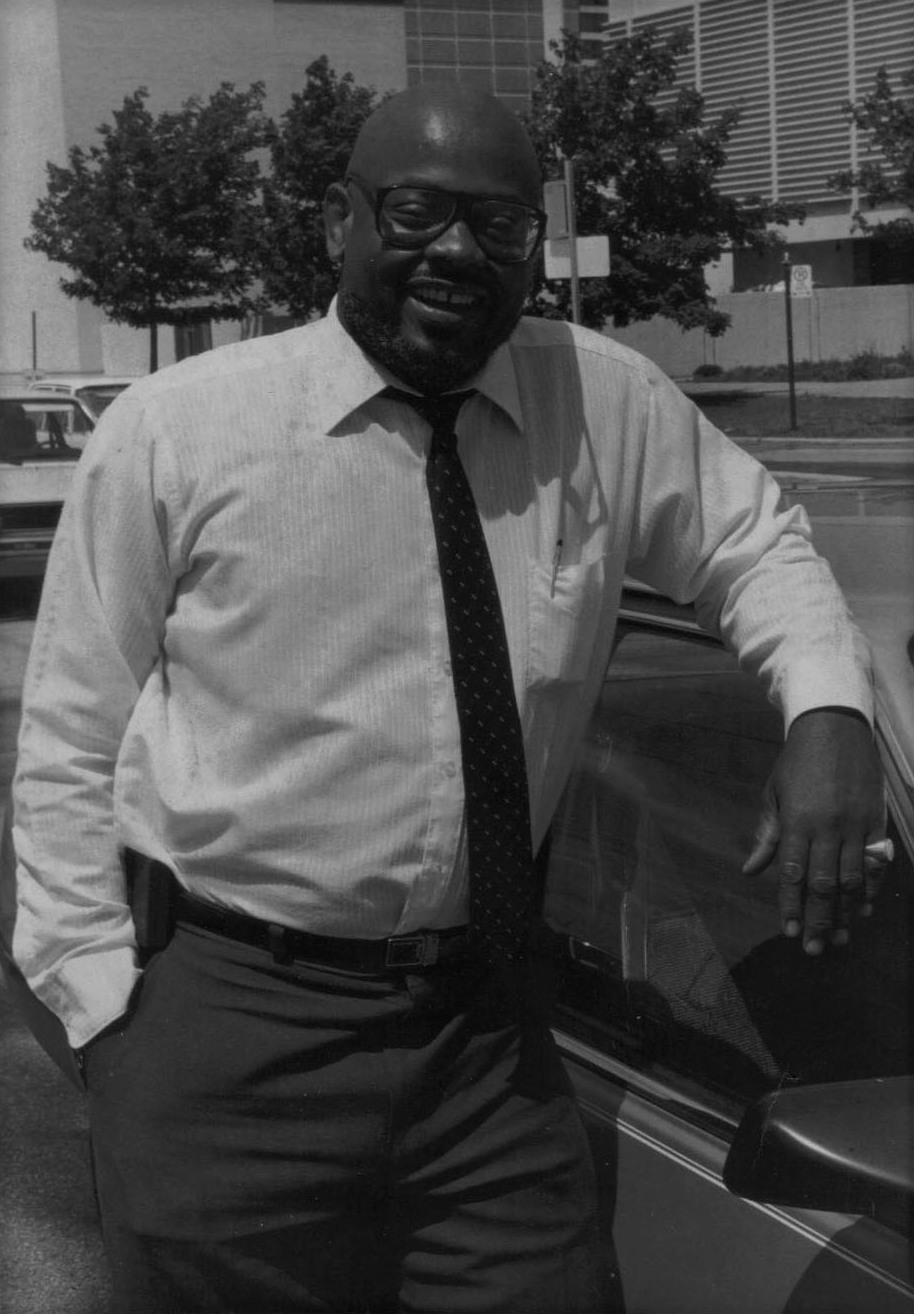

No. 52, 51
- Positions: Guard, Defensive tackle

Personal information
- Born: June 2, 1946 (age 80); Tulsa, Oklahoma, U.S.
- Listed height: 6 ft 0 in (1.83 m)
- Listed weight: 225 lb (102 kg)

Career information
- College: Oklahoma
- NFL draft: 1968: 10th round, 256th overall pick

Career history
- 1968–1972: Calgary Stampeders
- 1973–1978: Toronto Argonauts

Awards and highlights
- Grey Cup champion (1971); 2× CFL All-Star (1971, 1976); 2× CFL East All-Star (1975, 1976); 2× CFL West All-Star (1971, 1972); James P. McCaffrey Trophy (1976); UPI Lineman of the Year (1967); Unanimous All-American (1967); Second-team All-American (1966); Big Eight Player of the Year (1967); First-team All-Big Eight (1967); 2× Second-team All-Big Eight (1965, 1966)

Granville "Granny" Liggins (born June 2, 1946) is a Canadian- American former professional football player in the Canadian Football League (CFL). He played college football for the Oklahoma Sooners.

== College career ==
At the University of Oklahoma, Liggins was not only a football player, but also a wrestler. In 1967, he was an NCAA Division I All-American wrestler, a Consensus All-American with the Sooners football team, where he played noseguard, 7th in Heisman Trophy voting, UPI Lineman of the Year, and an All-Big Eight Conference All-Star. He was a member of the Sooners' squad when it upset the #2 ranked Tennessee Volunteers 26-24 in the 1968 Orange Bowl. A highlight feature of the game was nose-guard Liggins squaring off against Tennessee's All-American center Bob Johnson. By the 2nd half of the game, Tennessee was forced to double-team Liggins in an attempt to shut-off his quarterback pass rush.

In his autobiography, Fighting Back, former Pittsburgh Steelers running back Robert "Rocky" Bleier lauded Liggins as perhaps the fastest defensive lineman Bleier had ever faced during his college career.

== Professional career ==
After his college football career, he was drafted 256th overall in the tenth round by the Detroit Lions in 1968 but did not sign with them. However, he instead decided to go to Canada. During his football career, Liggins played for the Calgary Stampeders (1968–1972) and Toronto Argonauts (1973–1978) in the Canadian Football League (CFL). In Calgary, from 1969 to 1972, Liggins played right defensive tackle alongside left tackle John Helton, with Wayne Harris at middle linebacker, forming a very impressing middle part of a defense. He was a member of a Stampeder team that was best in the CFL in points allowed and beat the Argonauts to win the 59th Grey Cup game of 1971. Liggins made the CFL's All-Canadian Team in 1971 and 1976 and received All-Western Football Conference Honours in 1972.

During his time with the Toronto Argonauts in the mid-1970s, he was part of the team's famed "Dirty Dozen" defence, at the time the best in the CFL. Following a trade to the Ottawa Rough Riders, Liggins retired in 1978.

== Post-football ==
As an American football player who decided to stay in Canada after his playing career was over (later becoming a Canadian citizen), Liggins was featured on a 2004 Toronto Parks and Recreation "Contributions of African Canadians" poster created for Black History Month. Entitled "Beyond the Game", the poster featured Liggins and four other famous Toronto Argonaut players: Michael "Pinball" Clemons, Ulysses Curtis, Chuck Ealey and R. Bruce Smith.

Liggins is a member of The Pigskin Club of Washington, D.C. National Intercollegiate All-American Football Players Honor Roll. He currently resides in Oakville, Ontario.
