= Dennis Randall =

American football player (1945–2018)

No. 73, 81
- Positions: Defensive end, defensive tackle

Personal information
- Born: July 7, 1945; Tulsa, Oklahoma, U.S.
- Died: August 16, 2018 (aged 73); Oklahoma City, Oklahoma, U.S.
- Listed height: 6 ft 7 in (2.01 m)
- Listed weight: 250 lb (113 kg)

Career information
- High school: Tulsa (OK) McLain
- College: Oklahoma State
- NFL draft: 1967: 3rd round, 66th overall pick

Career history
- New York Jets (1967); Cincinnati Bengals (1968)

Awards and highlights
- Second-team All-American (1966); First-team All-Big Eight (1966)
- Stats at Pro Football Reference

Dennis Randall (July 7, 1945 – August 16, 2018) was an American professional football defensive end and defensive tackle. He played for the New York Jets in 1967 and Cincinnati Bengals in 1968.

He died on August 16, 2018, in Oklahoma City, Oklahoma at age 73.
