= Tom Quinn (American football) =

American football coach (born 1968)

New England Patriots
- Title: Assistant special teams coach

Personal information
- Born: January 27, 1968 (age 58)

Career information
- Position: Linebacker
- High school: Santa Ana (CA) Foothill
- College: Arizona
- NFL draft: 1991: undrafted

Career history
- Davidson (1991) Linebackers coach; James Madison (1992–1994) Special teams coordinator; Boston University (1995) Defensive coordinator; Holy Cross (1996–1998) Defensive coordinator; San Jose State (1999-2001); Linebackers coach/special teams coordinator (1999); Tight ends coach/special teams coordinator (2000-2001); Stanford (2002–2005); Tight ends coach/special teams coordinator (2002-2003); Outside linebackers coach/special teams coordinator (2004-2005); New York Giants (2006–2021); Assistant special teams coach (2006); Special teams coordinator (2007-2017); Assistant special teams coach (2018-2021); Tennessee Titans (2023) Assistant special teams coach/Interim special teams coordinator; New England Patriots (2024–present) Assistant special teams coach

Awards and highlights
- 2× Super Bowl champion (XLII, XLVI)

Tom Quinn (born January 27, 1968) is an American football coach who is currently the assistant special teams coach for the New England Patriots of the National Football League (NFL). He previously spent 11 years as the special teams coordinator for the New York Giants, where he was a part of two Super Bowl-winning teams.

== Career ==
=== New York Giants (2006–2021) ===
Quinn was hired by the Giants to serve as their assistant special teams coach under Mike Sweatman for the 2006 season. After one season, he was promoted to special teams coach. In 2007, Lawrence Tynes kicked a game-winning 47-yard field goal in overtime to send the Giants to Super Bowl XLII, as they defeated the Green Bay Packers 23–20. In 2011, Tynes again kicked a game-winning field goal in overtime, as his 31-yard kick sent the Giants to Super Bowl XLVI, as they defeated the San Francisco 49ers. During his tenure as special teams coach, the Giants have seen mixed results. His first season saw the Giants rank 11th in special teams. Since then, they have ranked near the middle or bottom of the league in each season.

Following the 2017 season, Quinn was fired by the Giants, however, he was re-hired as Assistant Special Teams Coach under Thomas McGaughey after the latter was diagnosed with cancer.

Following the 2021 season, Quinn was again relieved of duties by new head coach Brian Daboll.

=== Tennessee Titans (2023) ===
On March 21, 2023, the Tennessee Titans hired Quinn as the Titans' assistant special teams coach. On December 4, 2023, Quinn became the special teams coordinator for the Titans after Vrabel fired coordinator Craig Aukerman. The team finished 21st in the league that season.

=== New England Patriots (2024–present) ===
On February 19, 2024, Quinn was hired by the New England Patriots as their assistant special teams coach.
