= 1967 All-Big Eight Conference football team =

The 1967 All-Big Eight Conference football team consists of American football players chosen by various organizations for All-Big Eight Conference teams for the 1967 NCAA University Division football season. The selectors for the 1967 season included the Associated Press (AP).

== Offensive selections ==
=== Ends ===
- Dave Jones, Kansas State (AP-1)
- Dennis Richnafsky, Nebraska (AP-1)
- John Mosier, Kansas (AP-2)
- Tom Busch, Iowa State (AP-2)

=== Tackles ===
- Bob Kalsu, Oklahoma, (AP-1)
- Mike Montler, Colorado (AP-1)
- Russ Washington, Missouri (AP-1)
- Bob Taucher, Nebraska (AP-2)
- Harold Montgomery, Kansas (AP-2)

=== Guards ===
- Kirk Tracy, Colorado (AP-1)
- John Greene, Kansas (AP-1)
- Alan Pepper, Missouri (AP-2)
- Ken Mendenhall, Oklahoma (AP-2)

=== Centers ===
- Jon Kolb, Oklahoma State (AP-1)
- Conway Rees, Missouri (AP-2)

=== Backs ===
- Bobby Douglass, Kansas (AP-1)
- Bob Warmack, Oklahoma (AP-1)
- Steve Owens, Oklahoma (AP-1)
- Dick Davis, Nebraska (AP-1)
- Bobby Anderson, Colorado (AP-2)
- Cornelius Davis, Kansas State (AP-2)
- Ron Shotts, Oklahoma (AP-2)
- Jack Reynolds, Oklahoma State (AP-2)

== Defensive selections ==
=== Defensive ends ===
- John Zook, Kansas (AP-1)
- Mike Schnitker, Colorado (AP-1)
- John Keller, Oklahoma (AP-2)
- Elmer Benhardt, Missouri (AP-2)

=== Defensive tackles ===
- Granville Liggins, Oklahoma (AP-1)
- Jim McCord, Nebraska (AP-1)
- Frank Bosch, Colorado (AP-2)
- John Little, Oklahoma State (AP-2)

=== Middle guards ===
- Wayne Meylan, Nebraska (AP-1)
- Willie Muldrew, Iowa State (AP-2)

=== Linebackers ===
- John Douglas, Missouri (AP-1)
- Denny Lankas, Kansas State (AP-1)
- Mike Sweatman, Kansas (AP-1)
- Barry Alvarez, Nebraska (AP-2)
- Kerry Mottl, Colorado (AP-2)
- Don Pfrimmer, Oklahoma (AP-2)

=== Defensive backs ===
- Dick Anderson, Colorado (AP-1)
- Harry Cheatwood, Oklahoma State (AP-1)
- Roger Wehrli, Missouri (AP-1)
- Marv Mueller, Nebraska (AP-2)
- Charlie Greer, Colorado (AP-2)
- Bob Stephenson, Oklahoma (AP-2)

== Key ==
AP = Associated Press

== See also ==
- 1967 College Football All-America Team
