= Charlie Greer =

American football player (1946–1999)

No. 20
- Position: Safety

Personal information
- Born: March 4, 1946; Atlanta, Georgia, U.S.
- Died: December 7, 1999 (aged 53); Atlanta, Georgia, U.S.
- Listed height: 6 ft 0 in (1.83 m)
- Listed weight: 205 lb (93 kg)

Career information
- High school: South Fulton (East Point, Georgia)
- College: Colorado
- NFL draft: 1968: 13th round, 330th overall pick

Career history
- Denver Broncos (1968–1974)

Awards and highlights
- 2× Second-team All-Big Eight (1965, 1967)

Career NFL/AFL statistics
- Interceptions: 17
- Fumble recoveries: 11
- Touchdowns: 1
- Stats at Pro Football Reference

Charles Anthony Greer (April 4, 1946 – December 7, 1999) was an American professional football player who was a defensive back in the National Football League (NFL). He was selected by the Denver Broncos in the 13th round of the 1968 NFL/AFL draft. He played college football for the Colorado Buffaloes.
