= 1965 All-Big Eight Conference football team =

American all-star college football team

The 1965 All-Big Eight Conference football team consists of American football players chosen by various organizations for All-Big Eight Conference teams for the 1965 NCAA University Division football season. The selectors for the 1965 season included the Associated Press (AP) and United Press International (UPI).

== Offensive selections ==
=== Ends ===
- Freeman White, Nebraska (AP-1; UPI-1)
- Tony Jeter, Nebraska (AP-1; UPI-2)
- Eppie Barney, Iowa State (AP-2; UPI-1)
- Frank Rogers, Colorado (AP-2)

=== Tackles ===
- Dennis Carlson, Nebraska (AP-1; UPI-1)
- Francis Peay, Missouri (AP-1; UPI-1)
- Butch Allison, Missouri (AP-2; UPI-2)
- Mike Shinn, Kansas (AP-2)

=== Guards ===
- LaVerne Allers, Nebraska (AP-1; UPI-1)
- Richie Pratt, Kansas (AP-1)
- Mike Eader, Missouri (AP-2; UPI-1)
- Ed Hall, Oklahoma (AP-2)
- Bill Brooks, Iowa State (UPI-2)

=== Centers ===
- Dick Kasperek, Iowa State (AP-1; UPI-1)
- Larry Ferraro, Colorado (AP-2)

=== Backs ===
- Gary Lane, Missouri (AP-1; UPI-1)
- Charlie Brown, Missouri (AP-1; UPI-1)
- Walt Garrison, Oklahoma State (AP-1; UPI-1)
- Frank Solich, Nebraska (AP-1)
- Harry Wilson, Nebraska (AP-2; UPI-1)
- Billy Harris, Colorado (AP-2; UPI-2)
- Fred Duda, Nebraska (AP-2)
- Tim Van Galder, Iowa State (AP-2)

== Defensive selections ==
=== Defensive ends ===
- Sam Harris, Colorado (AP-1; UPI-1)
- Bill Matan, Kansas State (AP-1; UPI-1)
- Russ Washington, Missouri (AP-2; UPI-2)
- Ernie Kennedy, Iowa State (AP-2)

=== Defensive tackles ===
- Walt Barnes, Nebraska (AP-1; UPI-1)
- Bruce Van Dyke, Missouri (AP-1; UPI-1)
- Frank Bosch, Colorado (AP-2; UPI-2)
- Hugh McCrabb, Oklahoma State (AP-2)

=== Middle guards ===
- Charlie Harper, Oklahoma State (AP-1; UPI-1)
- Don Nelson, Missouri (AP-2)
- Granville Liggins, Kansas (UPI-2)

=== Linebackers ===
- Carl McAdams, Oklahoma (AP-1; UPI-1)
- Mike Kennedy, Nebraska (AP-1; UPI-1)
- Steve Sidwell, Colorado (AP-1; UPI-1)
- Mike Sweatman, Kansas (AP-2; UPI-2)
- Rich Bernsen, Missouri (AP-2)
- Ron Halda, Iowa State (AP-2)

=== Defensive backs ===
- Johnny Roland, Missouri (AP-1; UPI-1)
- Hale Irwin, Colorado (AP-1; UPI-1)
- Larry Wachholtz, Nebraska (AP-1; UPI-1)
- Ken Boston, Missouri (AP-2; UPI-2)
- Bill Johnson, Nebraska (AP-2)
- Charlie Greer, Colorado (AP-2)

== Key ==
AP = Associated Press

UPI = United Press International

== See also ==
- 1965 College Football All-America Team
