= Charlie Harper (American football) =

American football player (born 1944)

No. 61
- Positions: Guard, Offensive tackle, Defensive tackle

Personal information
- Born: August 14, 1944 (age 82); Haskell, Oklahoma, U.S.
- Listed height: 6 ft 0 in (1.83 m)
- Listed weight: 250 lb (113 kg)

Career information
- High school: Broken Arrow (OK)
- College: Oklahoma State (1962–1965)
- NFL draft: 1966: 8th round, 113th overall pick

Career history
- New York Giants (1966–1972)

Awards and highlights
- First-team All-Big Eight (1965)

Career NFL statistics
- Games played: 85
- Games started: 44
- Fumble recoveries: 3
- Stats at Pro Football Reference

Charles Lynwood Harper (born August 14, 1944) is an American former professional football player who was a guard for seven seasons with the New York Giants of the National Football League (NFL). He played college football for the Oklahoma State Cowboys.
