= Bill Fairband =

American football player (born 1941)

No. 86
- Position: Linebacker

Personal information
- Born: June 11, 1941 (age 85); Los Gatos, California, U.S.
- Listed height: 6 ft 3 in (1.91 m)
- Listed weight: 228 lb (103 kg)

Career information
- High school: Los Gatos
- College: Colorado
- NFL draft: 1967: 3rd round, 75th overall pick

Career history
- Oakland Raiders (1967–1968)

Awards and highlights
- AFL champion (1967); First-team All-Big Eight (1966)
- Stats at Pro Football Reference

Bill Fairband (born June 11, 1941) is an American former professional football player who was a linebacker for the Oakland Raiders of the American Football League (AFL) from 1967 to 1968. He played college football for the Colorado Buffaloes.
