= Dante Scarnecchia =

American football coach (born 1948)

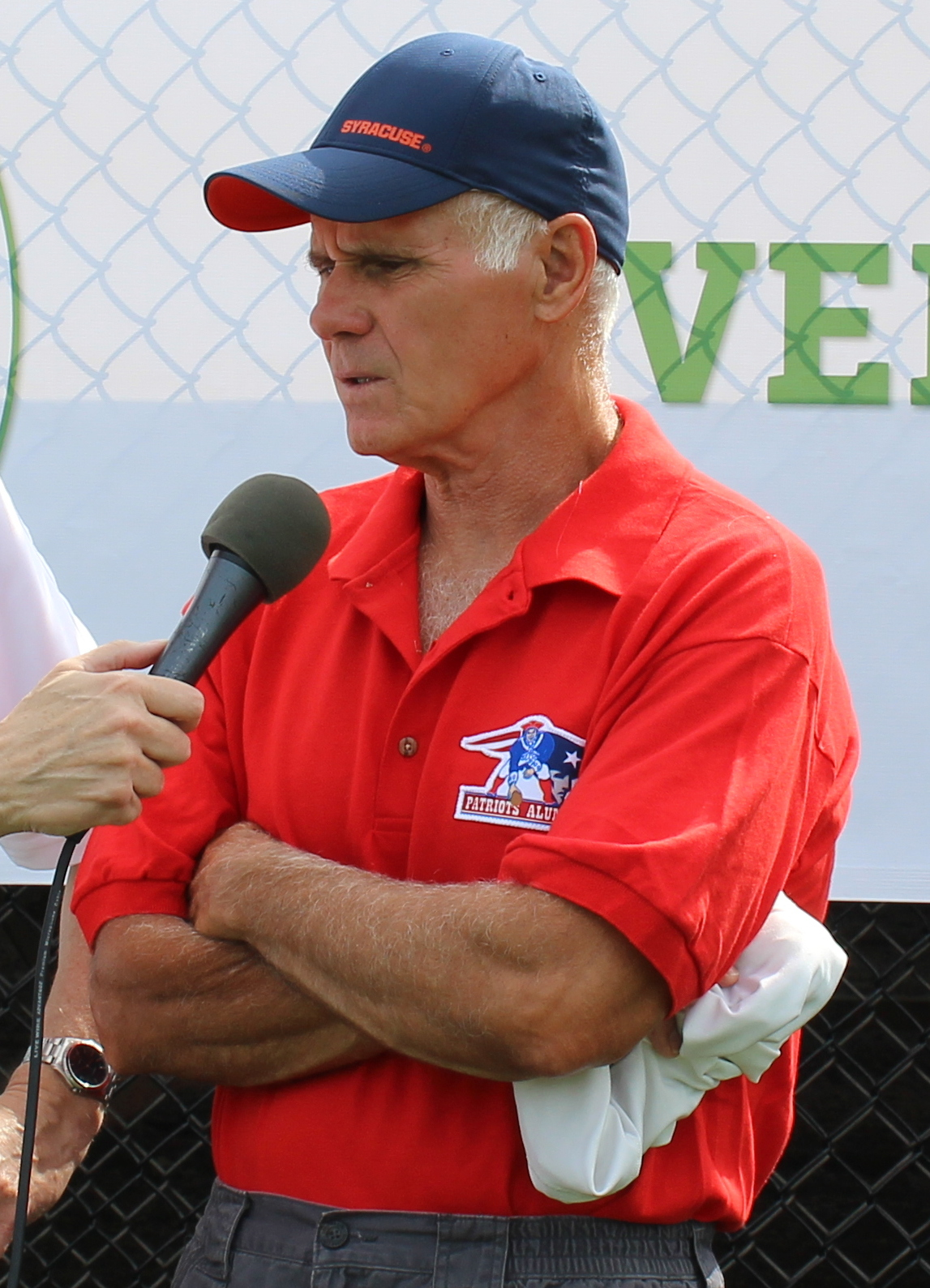
- Scarnecchia in 2014

Personal information
- Born: February 14, 1948 (age 78); Los Angeles, California, U.S.

Career information
- College: California Western

Career history
- California Western (1970–1972) Offensive line coach; Iowa State (1973–1974) Assistant offensive line coach & assistant defensive backfield coach; Southern Methodist (1975–1976); Graduate assistant (1975); Offensive line coach (1976); Pacific (1977–1978) Offensive line coach; Northern Arizona (1979) Offensive line coach; Southern Methodist (1980–1981) Offensive line coach; New England Patriots (1982–1988) Special teams coach & tight ends coach; Indianapolis Colts (1989–1990) Offensive line coach; New England Patriots (1991–2019); Special teams coach & tight ends coach (1991–1992); Special assistant (1993–1994); Defensive assistant (1995–1996); Special teams coach (1997–1998); Offensive line coach (1999); Assistant head coach & offensive line coach (2000–2013); Consultant (2014–2015); Offensive line coach (2016–2019)

Awards and highlights
- 5× Super Bowl champion (XXXVI, XXXVIII, XXXIX, LI, LIII); New England Patriots Hall of Fame

Dante Scarnecchia (/ˈdɑːnteɪ skɑːrˈnɛkiə/ DAHN-tay skar-NEK-ee-ə; born February 14, 1948) is an American former football offensive line coach and assistant head coach, best known for his 34-year association with the New England Patriots of the National Football League (NFL).

Scarnecchia has spent the majority of his professional coaching career with the Patriots, joining them in 1982, only leaving in 1989 to coach with the Indianapolis Colts, before returning to the Patriots two years later. He remained with the team as a coach until his retirement following the 2013 season. He was rehired as the offensive line coach on February 16, 2016. He retired on January 29, 2020, and was inducted into the Patriots Hall of Fame in 2023.

== Playing career ==
Scarnecchia attended Taft Junior College before transferring to California Western University in 1966, where he played football as an offensive lineman and earned a degree in physical education, while also serving as a sergeant in the U.S. Marine Corps Reserve.

== Coaching career ==
=== College ===
Scarnecchia began his coaching career in 1970 with his alma mater California Western University as their offensive line coach, a position he held through 1972. From 1973 to 1974, Scarnecchia was the assistant offensive line and assistant defensive backfield coach for Iowa State University. In 1975, he began a two-year stint with Southern Methodist University, first as a graduate assistant before being promoted to offensive line coach upon the hiring of head coach Ron Meyer in 1976. From 1977 through 1978, Scarnecchia served as offensive line coach for the University of the Pacific before spending a year at Northern Arizona University in the same capacity. He returned to Southern Methodist in 1980 as offensive line coach, spending two seasons there before following head coach Ron Meyer to the Patriots.

=== NFL ===
Scarnecchia joined the Patriots in 1982 as a special teams and tight end coach. From 1989 to 1990, he served on Meyer's Indianapolis Colts' staff as their offensive line coach. Scarnecchia returned to the Patriots in 1991, where he spent two seasons under Dick MacPherson again as a special teams and offensive line coach. In 1992, Scarnecchia held the responsibilities of head coach while MacPherson was ill for the final eight games of the season. Under head coach Bill Parcells in 1993 and 1994, Scarnecchia was reassigned as a special assistant. In 1995, Scarnecchia was again reassigned, this time to a defensive assistant. Once Parcells left the team after the 1996 New England Patriots season, and Pete Carroll was hired as head coach, Scarnecchia became the team's special teams coach again. In Carroll's final season with the Patriots, Scarnecchia was reassigned to offensive line coach. New head coach Bill Belichick additionally appointed Scarnecchia as the team's assistant head coach in 2000.

Scarnecchia retired after the 2013 season, and was replaced by Dave DeGuglielmo. After retiring as a coach, Scarnecchia continued working with the Patriots as a consultant; he had private workouts with the two offensive linemen the Patriots drafted in 2014, Bryan Stork and Cameron Fleming. After the Patriots fired DeGuglielmo after the 2015 season, the Patriots and Scarnecchia expressed mutual interest in having Scarnecchia return to coach the offensive line in 2016. Scarnecchia subsequently rejoined the Patriots staff prior to the 2016 season, overseeing a resurgent offensive line that only allowed 16 sacks. On February 5, 2017, Scarnecchia was part of the Patriots coaching staff that won Super Bowl LI. In the game, the Patriots defeated the Atlanta Falcons by a score of 34–28 in overtime. Scarnecchia won his fifth Super Bowl title when the Patriots defeated the Los Angeles Rams in Super Bowl LIII. Scarnecchia retired in 2020. On April 6, 2023, Robert Kraft announced that Scarnecchia would be inducted into the Patriots Hall of Fame.

== Personal life ==
Scarnecchia is married to Susan, with whom he has two children. His son Steve has followed him into the NFL, having held positions with the New York Jets, the Denver Broncos and the Atlanta Falcons, and in 2021, returned to the Jets as the chief of staff to head coach Robert Saleh.
