= Mike Sweatman =

American football coach (born 1946)

Personal information
- Born: October 23, 1946 (age 80); Kansas City, Missouri, U.S.

Career information
- High school: North Kansas City (MO)
- College: Kansas

Career history
- Kansas (1968) Graduate assistant; Okinawa Devil Dogs (1970) Head coach; Quantico Marines (1971–1972) Defensive coordinator; Kansas (1973–1974) Assistant; Coffeyville Community College (1975–1976) Defensive coordinator; Tulsa (1977–1978) Assistant; Kansas (1979–1982) Linebackers coach; Tennessee (1983) Defensive ends coach; Minnesota Vikings (1984) Special teams coach/outside linebackers coach; New York Giants (1985–1989) Defensive assistant & assistant special teams coach; New York Giants (1990–1992) Special teams coach; New England Patriots (1993–1996) Special teams coach; New York Jets (1997–2000) Special teams coach; Chicago Bears (2001–2003) Special teams coach; New York Giants (2004–2006) Special teams coordinator

Awards and highlights
- 2× Super Bowl champion (XXI, XXV); 2× First-team All-Big Eight (1966, 1967); Second-team All-Big Eight (1965)

Mike Sweatman (born October 23, 1946) is an American football coach. He served as an assistant coach for the Minnesota Vikings, New York Giants, New England Patriots, New York Jets and Chicago Bears.

== Early life ==
Sweatman played football at the University of Kansas (1965–67), where he was a two-time all-conference linebacker and three-time letterman. During his senior year, he earned Academic All-American honors and played in both the East-West Shrine Game and the Hula Bowl. He graduated with a bachelor's degree in Physical Education and a master's degree in education. Following graduation, he served four years in the United States Marines, and spent 26 years in the reserves before retiring as a Lieutenant Colonel.

== Career ==
Sweatman began coaching in 1968 and coached college football for 12 years. From 1985 to 1992, he served as both the assistant special teams coach and special teams coach for the New York Giants, and was a member of the staff that won both Super Bowl XXI and Super Bowl XXV.

In 2004, Sweatman returned to the Giants when new head coach Tom Coughlin hired him as his special teams coach. In 2004, the team led the NFL in kickoff return yardage for the first time since 1953, with an average return of 25.1 yards, and their average start following a kickoff was at the 30.1 yard line, the best average starting point in the NFC and fifth-best in the league. In Sweatman's first season with the Giants, the average start was the 31.8 yard line, the best in the NFL.

The Giants’ punt returns also improved from an average of 5.1 yards in 2003 (32nd in the league) to 9.2 the following year, (8th). Under his watch, David Tyree was voted to his first Pro Bowl, and punt returner Chad Morton was named as a first alternate. Jay Feely, another first Pro Bowl alternate, had the then-best season by a Giants kicker, leading all kickers with a team record and career-high 148 points, the first Giants kicker to hold the top spot since Don Chandler in 1963. Feely set career highs and tied two team records with 35 field goals and 42 field goal attempts, while punter Jeff Feagles was a consistent and productive player in his 18th season, with a 42.1 yard gross average and a 37.0 yard net average.

He retired from coaching following the 2006 season, and his assistant Tom Quinn was promoted to replace him.

== Personal life ==
Sweatman is married to Teri, and they have three sons: Tom, Chris and Dan.
