= Tim Van Galder =

American football player (1944–2022)

No. 16
- Position: Quarterback

Personal information
- Born: May 26, 1944; Racine, Wisconsin, U.S.
- Died: January 26, 2022 (aged 77); St. Charles, Missouri, U.S.
- Listed height: 6 ft 4 in (1.93 m)
- Listed weight: 200 lb (91 kg)

Career information
- High school: Madison West (Madison, Wisconsin)
- College: New Mexico Military Institute (1963); Iowa State (1964–1966)
- NFL draft: 1966: 6th round, 88th overall pick
- AFL draft: 1966: Red Shirt 2nd round, 13th overall pick

Career history
- St. Louis Cardinals (1967); Fort Worth Braves (1970); St. Louis Cardinals (1971–1972); Cincinnati Bengals (1973); New York Jets (1973)

Awards and highlights
- 2× Second-team All-Big Eight (1965, 1966)

Career NFL statistics
- Passing attempts: 79
- Passing completions: 40
- Completion percentage: 50.6%
- TD–INT: 1–7
- Passing yards: 434
- Passer rating: 34.5
- Stats at Pro Football Reference

Thomas Scott "Tim" Van Galder (May 26, 1944 – January 26, 2022) was an American professional football player who was a quarterback in the National Football League (NFL) with the St. Louis Cardinals (1967, 1971–1972) and the New York Jets (1973). He played college football and baseball at Iowa State University and the New Mexico Military Institute. While at Iowa State he earned all Big Eight Conference honors in both sports. He was later a sportscaster on St. Louis television.

Van Galder was born in Racine, Wisconsin on May 26, 1944. Although drafted in 1966 by the Cardinals he spent most of his first 3 seasons on their taxi squad, only being briefly activated but not playing in 1967. His first NFL action came on opening day of 1972 when he started at quarterback for the Cardinals and led them to a 10–3 victory over the Baltimore Colts. He started 4 more games for the Cardinals that season but the Cardinals did not win any of them; he missed several games with a concussion suffered in game 3, and he ended the season with a 34.5 quarterback rating on 79 passes (with 7 interceptions).

He was waived by the Cardinals and picked up by the Cincinnati Bengals before the 1973 season to replace the injured Virgil Carter as Ken Anderson's backup. The Bengals released him after an opening game loss in which Van Galder did not play and replaced him with Mike Ernst. He was signed in October by the New York Jets to back up 3rd string quarterback Bill Demory after their top two quarterbacks, Joe Namath and Al Woodall, were hurt. The Jets released him after two games in which Van Galder did not play.

In 1973, Van Galder became a sportscaster in St. Louis for KMOV, where he spent 13 years.

Van Galder died from cancer in St. Charles, Missouri, on January 26, 2022, at the age of 77.
