= Frank Bosch =

American football player (born 1945)

No. 73, 71
- Positions: Defensive tackle, Defensive end

Personal information
- Born: October 24, 1945 (age 81); Bremerton, Washington, U.S.
- Listed height: 6 ft 4 in (1.93 m)
- Listed weight: 255 lb (116 kg)

Career information
- High school: Boise (Boise, Idaho)
- College: Colorado (1964-1967)
- NFL draft: 1968: 17th round, 446th overall pick

Career history
- Washington Redskins (1968–1969); Baltimore Colts (1970)*; Washington Redskins (1970)
- * Offseason or practice squad member only

Awards and highlights
- 3× Second-team All-Big Eight (1965−1967)

Career NFL statistics
- Fumble recoveries: 1
- Sacks: 6.5
- Stats at Pro Football Reference

Frank William Bosch (born October 24, 1945) is an American former professional football player who was a defensive lineman for the Washington Redskins of the National Football League (NFL). He played college football for the Colorado Buffaloes and was selected 446th overall in the 17th round of the 1968 NFL/AFL draft.
