= History of the Carolina Panthers =

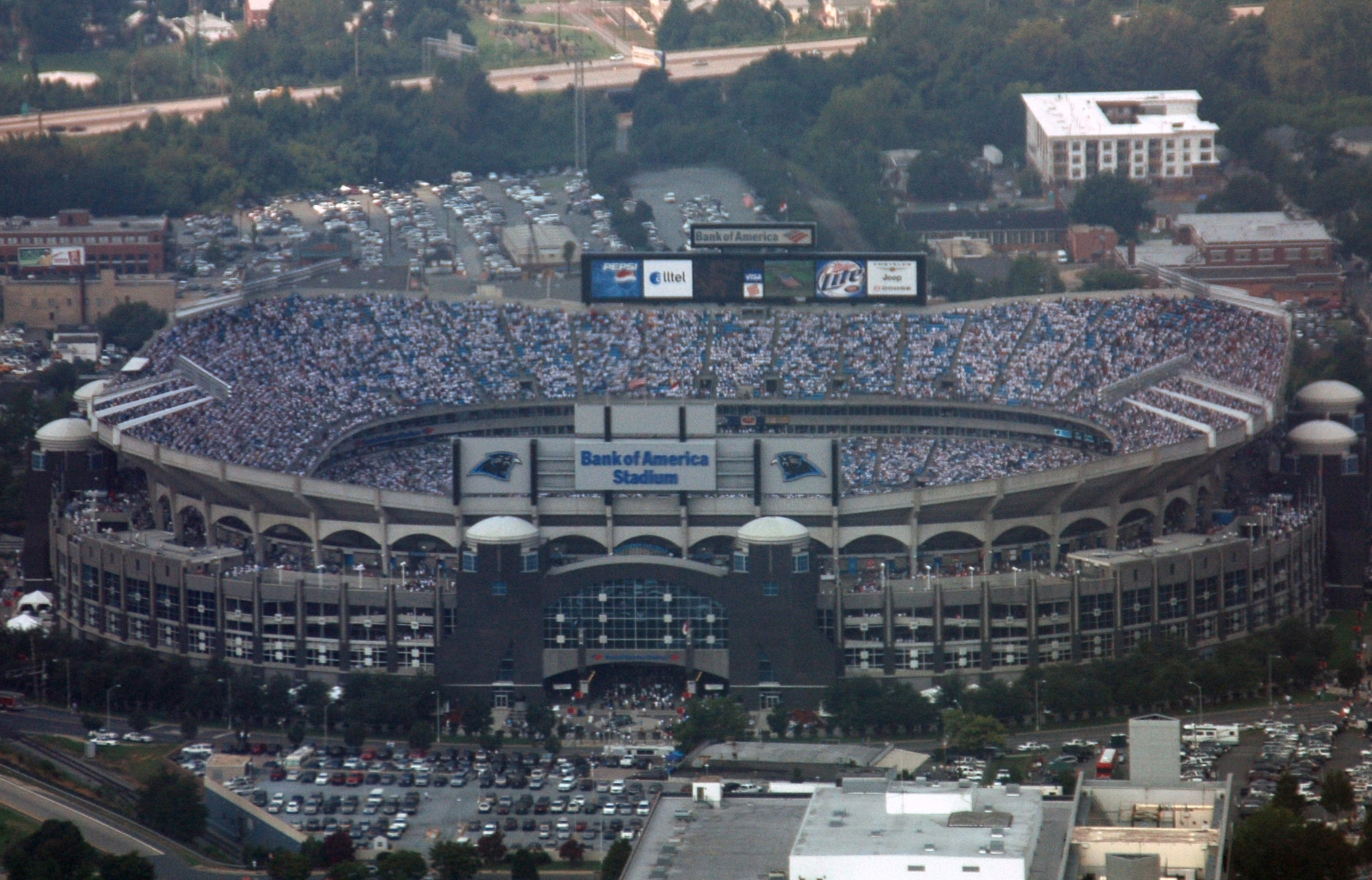
Bank of America Stadium, pictured in 2006, has been the Panthers' home since 1996.

The Carolina Panthers trace their origins to a regional campaign launched in 1987 by former Baltimore Colts wide receiver Jerry Richardson to secure a National Football League (NFL) expansion franchise for the Carolinas. The bid paired demonstrations of regional demand with a plan for a privately financed stadium in Charlotte. NFL owners unanimously awarded the Carolinas the league's 29th franchise in October 1993, and the Panthers began play in 1995. Because their Charlotte stadium was still under construction, Carolina played its inaugural home season at Memorial Stadium in Clemson, South Carolina. The Panthers finished 7–9, setting an NFL record for wins by an expansion team in its inaugural season. In 1996, they won the NFC West and reached the NFC Championship Game.

After missing the playoffs for five consecutive seasons, including a 1–15 finish in 2001, Carolina hired John Fox. The Panthers won their first NFC championship during the 2003 postseason before losing Super Bowl XXXVIII to the New England Patriots. During that run, linebackers coach and former Panthers linebacker Sam Mills delivered a pregame address built around the phrase "Keep Pounding"; the phrase later became the franchise's motto. The Fox era also included another NFC Championship Game appearance in 2005 and an NFC South title in 2008.

Under head coach Ron Rivera and quarterback Cam Newton, Carolina won three consecutive NFC South titles from 2013 through 2015. The 2015 team finished a franchise-best 15–1, Newton was named NFL Most Valuable Player, and the Panthers won their second NFC championship before losing Super Bowl 50 to the Denver Broncos.

In December 2017, amid reports alleging workplace misconduct, Richardson announced that he would sell the franchise. David Tepper purchased the team in 2018, and Rivera was dismissed in 2019. The Panthers missed the playoffs in every season from 2018 through 2024 amid repeated changes at head coach and quarterback. Under head coach Dave Canales, Carolina won the NFC South with an 8–9 record in 2025 and returned to the postseason for the first time since 2017, losing to the Los Angeles Rams in the wild-card round.

== Origins: 1987–1994 ==
The expansion campaign combined a two-state political effort with a privately financed stadium plan based on permanent seat licenses (PSLs). Sold-out preseason games demonstrated that the Carolinas were a viable NFL market, while PSL sales supplied a way to finance the proposed stadium.

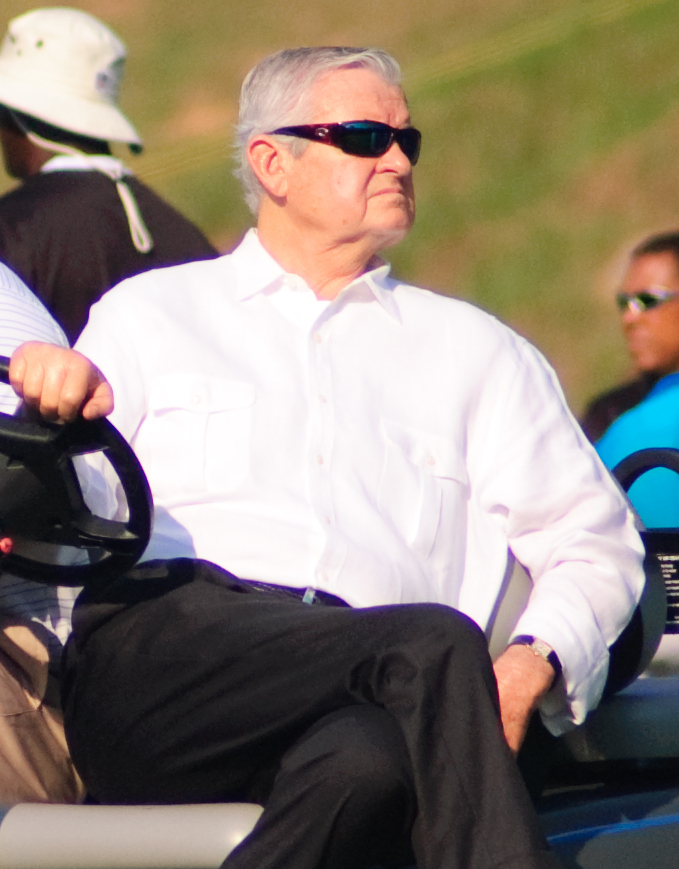
Jerry Richardson, pictured in 2009, organized the regional expansion campaign that led to the Panthers' creation.

Jerry Richardson began organizing the expansion effort on July 16, 1987, at a meeting with potential investors in Charlotte. He publicly entered the NFL's expansion competition on December 15, 1987. Exactly two years later, Richardson Sports chose an Uptown Charlotte site for a privately financed stadium planned to hold more than 70,000 spectators.

Political support for the bid also involved both North Carolina and South Carolina. U.S. senators Jesse Helms of North Carolina and Ernest Hollings of South Carolina lobbied NFL owners, while North Carolina governor Jim Martin and South Carolina governor Carroll A. Campbell Jr. formed a committee to support the proposal. Bid organizers also arranged neutral-site NFL preseason games in 1989 at Carter–Finley Stadium in Raleigh, North Carolina; in 1990 at Kenan Memorial Stadium in Chapel Hill, North Carolina; and in 1991 at Williams–Brice Stadium in Columbia, South Carolina. All three games sold out, helping demonstrate regional support for professional football.

By May 1992, the Carolinas were among five finalists for expansion, along with Baltimore, St. Louis, Memphis, and Jacksonville. The expansion process was delayed by the league's labor dispute and resumed in 1993. On June 3, 1993, Richardson Sports announced plans to finance a 72,300-seat stadium through the sale of PSLs, club seats, and luxury suites. The first day produced 41,632 PSL orders, and buyers reserved every club seat and luxury suite offered. The PSL plan, developed with sports marketer Max Muhleman, became central to the stadium-financing proposal and helped fund what later became Bank of America Stadium.

NFL owners selected the Carolina proposal unanimously on October 26, 1993. The decision created the league's 29th club and its first expansion franchise since 1976. Jacksonville was awarded the league's 30th franchise on November 30, and both teams were scheduled to begin play in 1995. In November 1994, league owners assigned the Panthers to the NFC West and Jacksonville to the AFC Central.

== Dom Capers era: 1995–1998 ==
The Panthers hired Pittsburgh Steelers defensive coordinator Dom Capers as the first head coach in franchise history.

During Capers's four seasons, Carolina set an NFL record for wins by an expansion team in its inaugural season, reached the NFC Championship Game in its second season, and then missed the playoffs in 1997 and 1998.

=== Inaugural season and 1996 playoff run: 1995–1996 ===
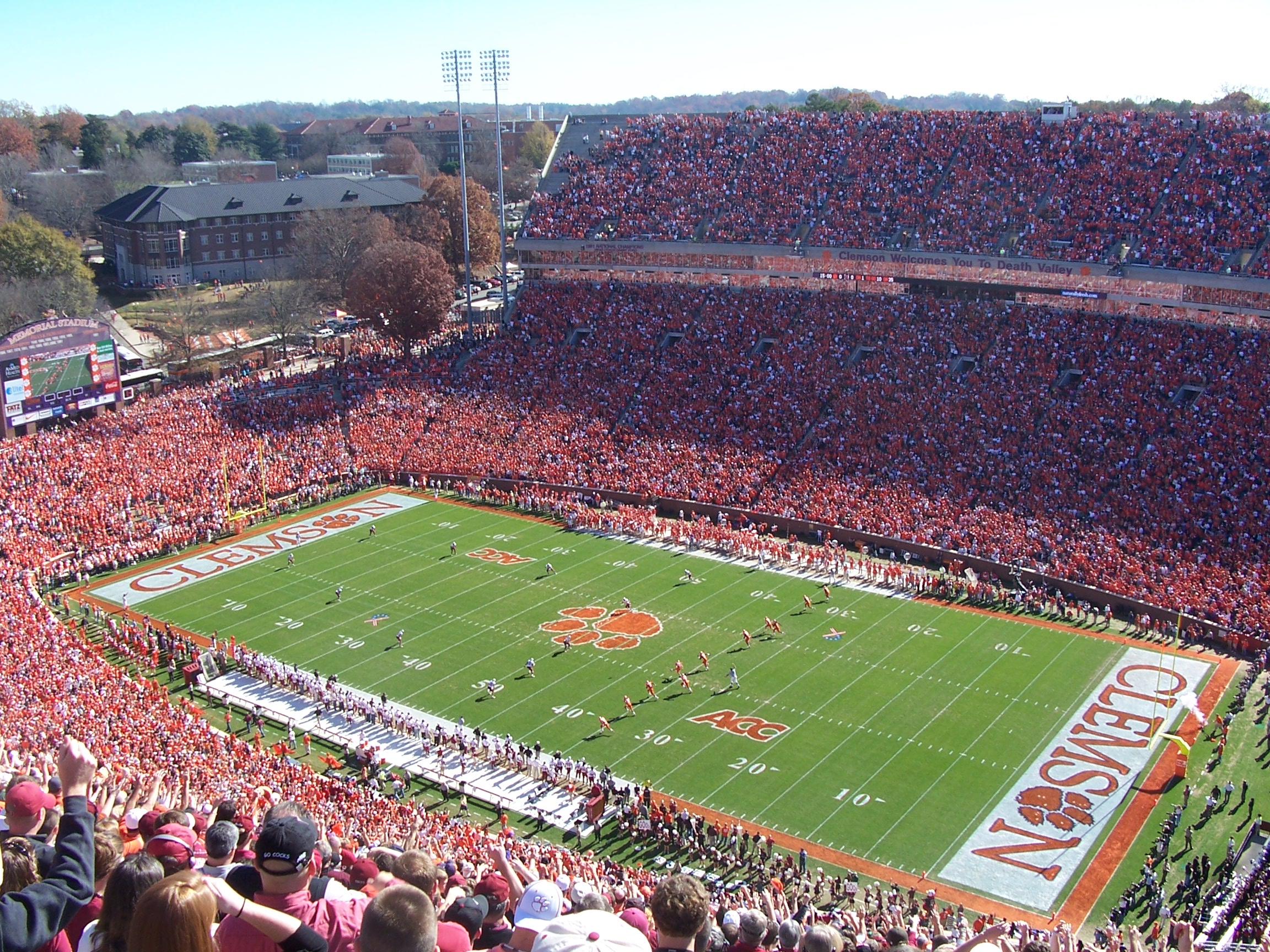
Memorial Stadium, pictured in 2006, hosted the Panthers' home games during their inaugural 1995 season.

General manager Bill Polian assembled Carolina's inaugural roster through the expansion draft, free agency, and the 1995 NFL draft. The roster mixed veterans—including John Kasay, Sam Mills, and Frank Reich—with younger players such as rookie quarterback Kerry Collins. The Panthers entered the NFL draft with the first overall pick but traded down and selected Collins fifth overall.

Carolina made its on-field debut by defeating fellow expansion team Jacksonville in the 1995 Pro Football Hall of Fame Game. Because the team's Charlotte stadium was still under construction, the Panthers played their home games at Memorial Stadium in Clemson, South Carolina.

Carolina lost its regular-season debut 23–20 in overtime to the Atlanta Falcons. Reich started the first three games before rookie Collins became Carolina's primary starting quarterback.

After an 0–5 start, the Panthers earned their first regular-season victory on October 15, defeating the New York Jets 26–15 after Mills returned an interception for a touchdown. Carolina won its next three games, including a 13–7 road victory over the defending Super Bowl XXIX champion San Francisco 49ers, becoming the first expansion team to defeat a reigning Super Bowl champion. The Panthers finished 7–9, setting an NFL record for wins by an expansion team in its inaugural season.

Carolina added veteran quarterback Steve Beuerlein, tight end Wesley Walls, linebacker Kevin Greene, and cornerback Eric Davis, and selected wide receiver Muhsin Muhammad in the draft.

The Panthers moved into Ericsson Stadium in Charlotte in 1996 after playing their inaugural home schedule at Memorial Stadium in Clemson.

Carolina started the season 5–4 before winning its final seven regular-season games. The Panthers finished 12–4, went 8–0 at home, and won the NFC West, the first division title in franchise history. The San Francisco 49ers also finished 12–4, but Carolina won the division tiebreaker after sweeping the season series.

In the divisional round, Carolina won the first playoff game in franchise history, defeating the defending Super Bowl XXX champion Dallas Cowboys 26–17 at Ericsson Stadium. The Panthers then lost 30–13 to the Green Bay Packers in the NFC Championship Game at Lambeau Field.

Eight Panthers earned 1997 Pro Bowl selections, and Capers was named Associated Press NFL Coach of the Year, becoming the first Panthers head coach to receive the award.

=== Decline and Capers's dismissal: 1997–1998 ===
One season after reaching the NFC Championship Game, Carolina went 7–9 and failed to return to the playoffs; the Panthers were second in the NFC West.

Before the season, Carolina signed defensive lineman Sean Gilbert to a seven-year, $46.5 million contract, a move that cost the Panthers their 1999 and 2000 first-round draft picks as compensation to the Washington Redskins.

Carolina opened the season with seven consecutive losses. Kerry Collins started the first four games, but after a loss to the Atlanta Falcons, he asked head coach Dom Capers to remove him from the starting lineup. Steve Beuerlein became the starter, and Collins was waived by Carolina on October 13.

A 4–12 season—the worst in franchise history to that point—kept Carolina out of the playoffs for a second consecutive year. On December 28, one day after the season finale, Capers was fired after four seasons, having compiled a 30–34 record with Carolina.

== George Seifert era: 1999–2001 ==
The Panthers hired former San Francisco 49ers head coach George Seifert as the second head coach in franchise history. Seifert had won two Super Bowls as head coach during his eight-season tenure with San Francisco.

Although Carolina remained in playoff contention through the final week of Seifert's first season, the team did not reach the playoffs during his three-year tenure and finished 1–15 in 2001.

=== Playoff contention and decline: 1999–2000 ===
In Seifert's first season, the Panthers finished 8–8, a four-win improvement from 1998 and the franchise's first 8–8 season. Quarterback Steve Beuerlein led the NFL with 4,436 passing yards and set a franchise record with 36 touchdown passes. Carolina entered the final week in contention for an NFC wild-card berth but missed the playoffs after finishing behind the Dallas Cowboys and Detroit Lions in tiebreakers.

In 1999, wide receiver Rae Carruth, Carolina's 1997 first-round draft pick, was arrested in connection with the fatal shooting of Cherica Adams; he was convicted in 2001 of conspiracy to commit murder and related charges.

At 7–9, Carolina was third in the NFC West and extended its playoff drought to four seasons.

=== The 1–15 season: 2001 ===
Carolina selected linebacker Dan Morgan, defensive tackle Kris Jenkins, and wide receiver and returner Steve Smith in the 2001 draft. All three remained on the roster for Carolina's 2003 NFC championship season.

After releasing longtime starting quarterback Steve Beuerlein during the offseason, Carolina entered the season with no quarterback on its roster who had previously started an NFL game. Rookie Chris Weinke opened the season as the starting quarterback.

Carolina won its season opener before losing its remaining 15 games, finishing 1–15 and last in the NFC West. At the time, the 15-game skid was an NFL single-season record.

George Seifert was fired on January 7, 2002, one day after the season finale. He finished his three-season tenure in Carolina with a 16–32 regular-season record and no playoff appearances. The 2001 season was also Carolina's final season in the NFC West. As part of the NFL's 2002 realignment, the Panthers joined the Atlanta Falcons, New Orleans Saints, and Tampa Bay Buccaneers in the newly created NFC South.

== John Fox era: 2002–2010 ==
The Panthers hired New York Giants defensive coordinator John Fox as the third head coach in franchise history on January 25, 2002. At his introductory news conference, Fox emphasized running the ball and stopping the run as priorities for the team.

=== Defensive rebuild and Super Bowl XXXVIII: 2002–2003 ===
Carolina selected defensive end Julius Peppers with the second overall pick in the 2002 NFL draft. Peppers recorded 12 sacks in 12 games and was named NFL Defensive Rookie of the Year.

Carolina ended the 15-game losing streak carried over from 2001 and improved to 7–9. The Panthers' defense allowed the NFL's second-fewest yards and fifth-fewest points.

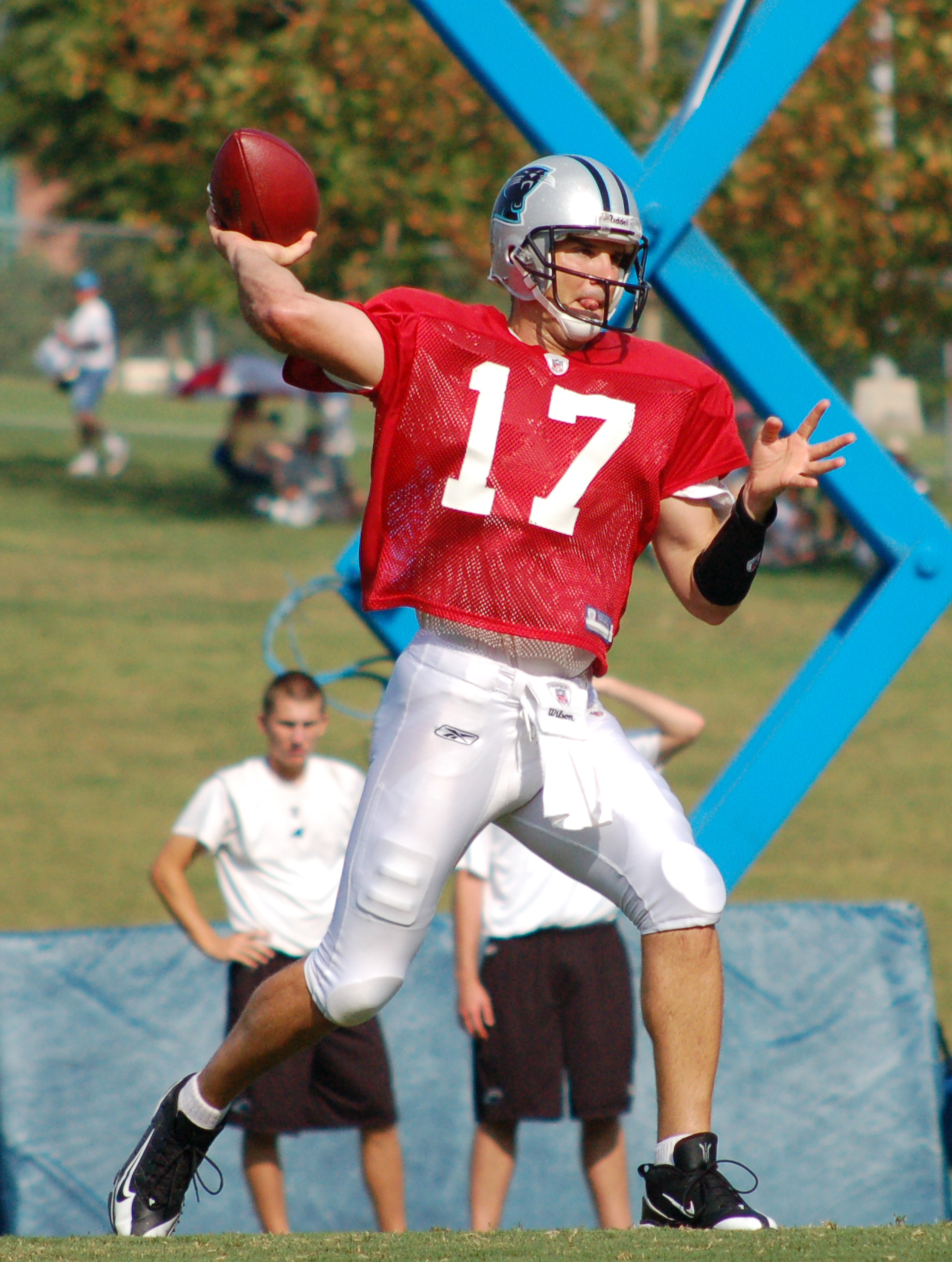
Jake Delhomme, pictured at Panthers training camp in 2008, became Carolina's starting quarterback in 2003 and led the team to its first NFC championship.

Carolina drafted offensive tackle Jordan Gross and cornerback Ricky Manning Jr., and signed quarterback Jake Delhomme, running back Stephen Davis, and wide receiver Ricky Proehl. Davis rushed for 1,444 yards and eight touchdowns, while Steve Smith led the team with 1,110 receiving yards.

Linebacker Mark Fields missed the season after being diagnosed with Hodgkin lymphoma during training camp. Linebackers coach Sam Mills was diagnosed with intestinal cancer in August 2003 but continued coaching during treatment; his pregame address before Carolina's wild-card game later became associated with the franchise's "Keep Pounding" motto.

Rodney Peete opened the regular season as Carolina's starting quarterback, but Delhomme replaced him to start the second half of the season opener against the Jacksonville Jaguars and led a 24–23 comeback win, capped by a late touchdown pass to Proehl. Delhomme became the starter the following week. Carolina won its first five games and finished 11–5. The Panthers won the NFC South and returned to the playoffs for the first time since 1996. The team's close finishes, including five overtime games and, counting the postseason, 14 games decided by a touchdown or less, led to the nickname "Cardiac Cats".

In the wild-card round, Carolina defeated the Dallas Cowboys 29–10. Carolina then defeated the St. Louis Rams 29–23 in double overtime in the divisional round at the Edward Jones Dome, winning on a 69-yard touchdown pass from Delhomme to Smith on the first play of the second overtime. In the NFC Championship Game, Carolina defeated the Philadelphia Eagles 14–3 at Lincoln Financial Field, with Manning intercepting three passes. The win gave the Panthers their first NFC championship and sent the franchise to Super Bowl XXXVIII.

In Super Bowl XXXVIII, played at Reliant Stadium in Houston on February 1, 2004, Carolina lost 32–29 to the New England Patriots. The Panthers tied the game late in the fourth quarter on a touchdown pass from Delhomme to Proehl, but New England won on Adam Vinatieri's 41-yard field goal with four seconds remaining.

=== Injuries and the 2005 playoff run: 2004–2005 ===
Injuries sidelined Steve Smith, Kris Jenkins, Stephen Davis, and DeShaun Foster for parts of the season. After a 1–7 start, Carolina won six of its next seven games but finished 7–9 and missed the playoffs.

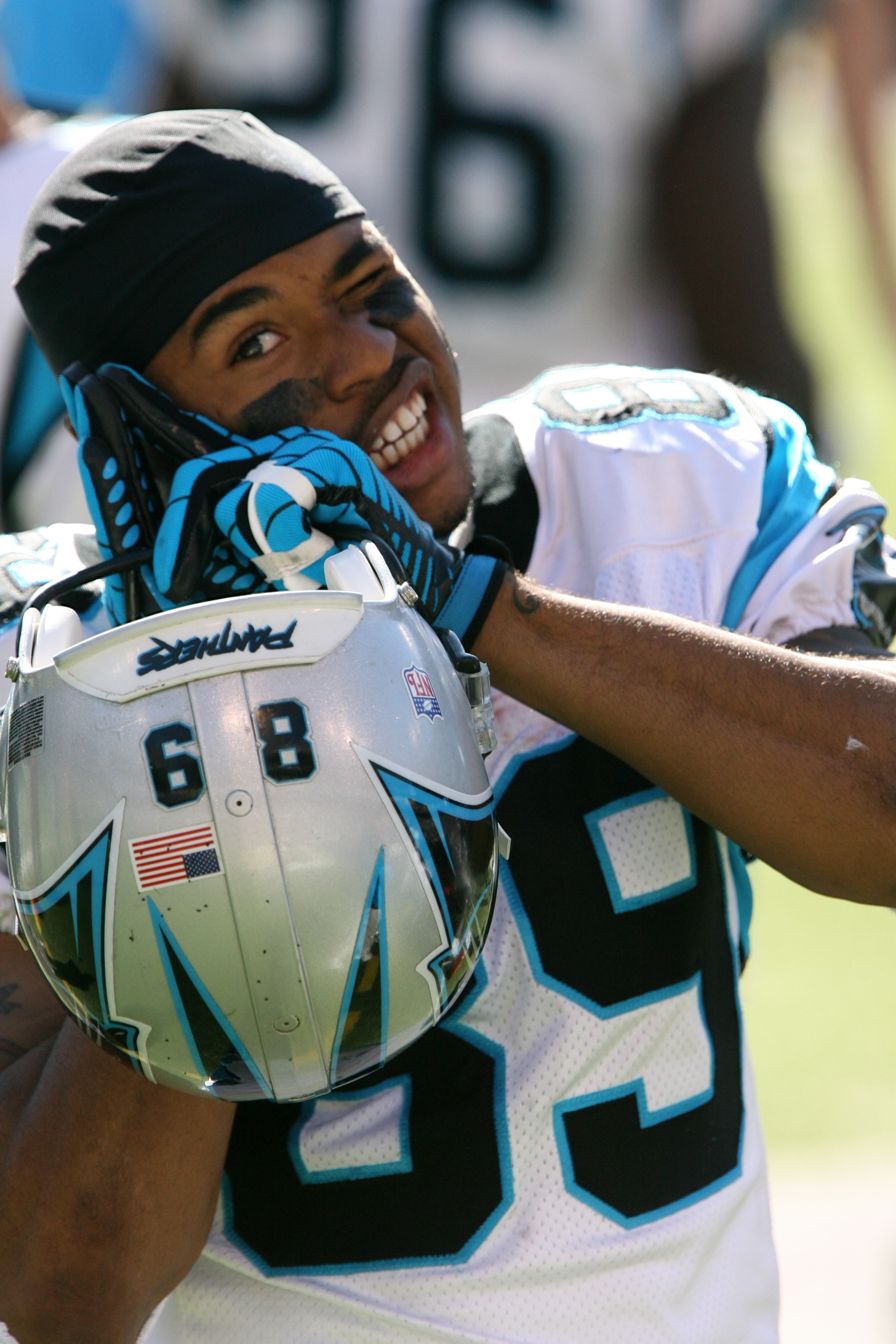
Steve Smith, pictured in 2006, led the NFL in receiving yards during Carolina's 2005 run to the NFC Championship Game.

Carolina selected linebacker Thomas Davis in the 2005 draft; he played 14 seasons for the franchise.

Wide receiver Steve Smith returned from the broken leg that had ended his 2004 season. Smith led the NFL in receiving yards and tied for the league lead in receptions and touchdown catches, finishing with 103 receptions, 1,563 receiving yards, and 12 touchdown catches. He also shared the Associated Press NFL Comeback Player of the Year award with New England Patriots linebacker Tedy Bruschi.

After a 1–2 start, Carolina won six consecutive games and went on to finish 11–5. The Panthers tied the Tampa Bay Buccaneers for the best record in the NFC South, but Tampa Bay won the division tiebreaker and Carolina entered the playoffs as a wild-card team.

In the wild-card round, the Panthers defeated the New York Giants 23–0 at Giants Stadium. Carolina then defeated the Chicago Bears 29–21 at Soldier Field in the divisional round, with Smith recording 12 receptions for 218 yards and two touchdowns. The Panthers reached the NFC Championship Game for the third time in franchise history but lost 34–14 to the Seattle Seahawks at Qwest Field on January 22, 2006.

=== Missed playoffs and quarterback instability: 2006–2007 ===
Carolina finished 8–8 and missed the playoffs in 2006.

In 2007, Jake Delhomme underwent season-ending elbow surgery after three games. The Panthers used four starting quarterbacks and went 7–9, their second consecutive season without a playoff berth.

=== Division title and end of the Fox era: 2008–2010 ===
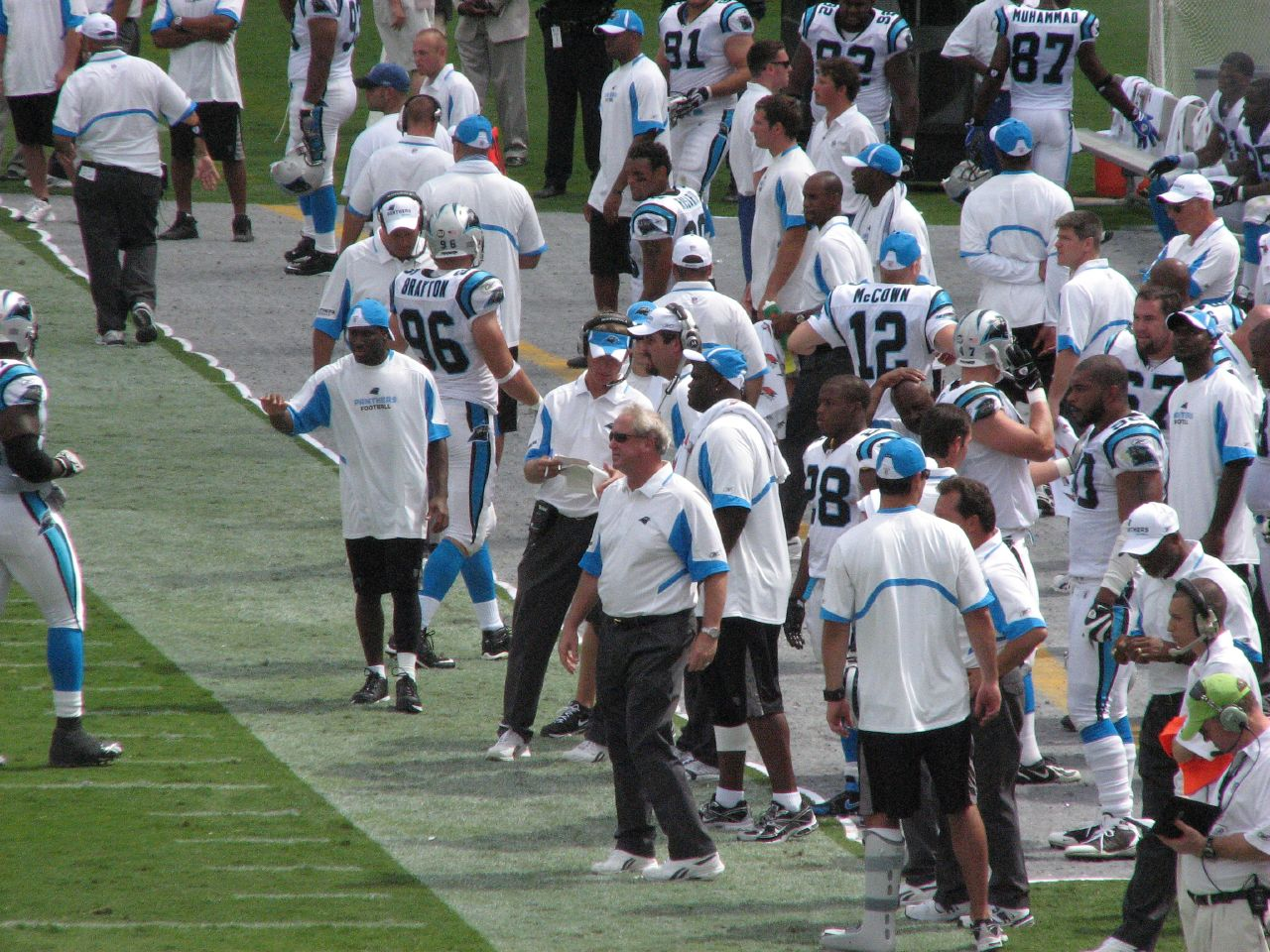
The Panthers' sideline during the 2008 season, when Carolina finished 12–4 and won the NFC South.

Running backs DeAngelo Williams and rookie Jonathan Stewart led Carolina's rushing attack. Williams rushed for 1,515 yards and 18 touchdowns, while Stewart added 836 yards and 10 touchdowns.

The Panthers finished 12–4, a five-win improvement from the previous season, went 8–0 at home, and won the NFC South for the second time in franchise history. Carolina clinched the division in the regular-season finale, a 33–31 road win over the New Orleans Saints.

After a first-round bye, Carolina lost 33–13 to the Arizona Cardinals at Bank of America Stadium in the divisional round on January 10, 2009. Quarterback Jake Delhomme committed six turnovers.

After Delhomme suffered a broken finger, Matt Moore started the final five games, and Carolina finished 8–8. Stewart and Williams became the first pair of running backs on the same NFL team to each surpass 1,100 rushing yards in one season.

Before the 2010 season, Carolina released quarterback Jake Delhomme, its primary starter since 2003; defensive end Julius Peppers signed with the Chicago Bears; and wide receiver Muhsin Muhammad retired.

Carolina started three quarterbacks during the season: Matt Moore, Jimmy Clausen, and Brian St. Pierre. At 2–14, the Panthers had the NFL's worst record and were last in the NFC South. The record gave Carolina the first overall pick in the 2011 NFL draft, which the team later used to select quarterback Cam Newton.

On December 31, before the regular-season finale, the Panthers announced that John Fox would not return as head coach after the season. Fox ended his nine-season tenure in Carolina with a 73–71 regular-season record, three playoff appearances, two NFC Championship Game appearances, and one Super Bowl appearance.

== Ron Rivera era: 2011–2019 ==
The Panthers hired San Diego Chargers defensive coordinator Ron Rivera as the fourth head coach in franchise history on January 11, 2011.

Rivera's nine-season tenure included three consecutive NFC South titles from 2013 through 2015 and the 2015 NFC championship, which sent Carolina to Super Bowl 50.

=== Rebuilding around Newton and Kuechly: 2011–2012 ===
With the first overall pick in the 2011 NFL draft, Carolina selected Auburn quarterback Cam Newton, the 2010 Heisman Trophy winner. The Panthers also acquired tight end Greg Olsen from the Chicago Bears in July.

Newton opened his career with consecutive 400-yard passing games, becoming the first player in NFL history to throw for more than 400 yards in each of his first two games. He finished the season with a then-NFL rookie record 4,051 passing yards and a then-NFL single-season quarterback record 14 rushing touchdowns. Newton was named Associated Press NFL Offensive Rookie of the Year, becoming the first Panthers player to win the award.

Carolina improved by four wins to 6–10, taking third place in the NFC South.

Before the season, the Panthers introduced an updated logo and wordmark, the franchise's first logo update since entering the NFL in 1995. Carolina selected linebacker Luke Kuechly ninth overall in the 2012 NFL draft. Kuechly was named Associated Press NFL Defensive Rookie of the Year after the season.

Carolina started the season 1–5, and longtime general manager Marty Hurney was fired on October 22 after more than a decade with the organization. After falling to 2–8, the Panthers won five of their final six games, but a 7–9 record put them second in the NFC South and extended their playoff drought to four seasons. After the season, the Panthers announced that Ron Rivera would return as head coach in 2013.

=== Three consecutive division titles and Super Bowl 50: 2013–2015 ===
The Panthers hired longtime New York Giants executive Dave Gettleman as general manager on January 9, 2013; Gettleman's first draft included defensive tackles Star Lotulelei and Kawann Short. Carolina's defense allowed 241 points and 4,820 total yards that season, ranking second in the NFL in both categories.

After a 1–3 start, Carolina won 11 of its final 12 regular-season games to finish 12–4 and win the NFC South. Rivera's increased willingness to attempt fourth-down conversions during the turnaround contributed to the nickname "Riverboat Ron". The Panthers lost to the San Francisco 49ers in the divisional round.

After the season, Rivera was named Associated Press NFL Coach of the Year. Linebacker Luke Kuechly was named Associated Press NFL Defensive Player of the Year, becoming the first Panthers player to receive the award.

Before the season, the Panthers released longtime wide receiver Steve Smith, who was then the leading receiver in franchise history.

Defensive end Greg Hardy appeared in only one game that season and was placed on the NFL commissioner's exempt list while a domestic violence case against him was pending. Prosecutors later dismissed the charges after saying they could not locate the accuser for a jury trial, and the Panthers did not attempt to re-sign Hardy after the season.

After a 3–8–1 start, Carolina won its final four games and became the first repeat NFC South champion. At 7–8–1, the Panthers were also the second NFL team in a full season to win a division with a losing record.

In the wild-card round, Carolina defeated the Arizona Cardinals 27–16 at Bank of America Stadium, the franchise's first postseason victory since the 2005 season. The Panthers held Arizona to 78 total yards, the fewest allowed in an NFL postseason game. Carolina then lost 31–17 to the eventual NFC champion Seattle Seahawks in the divisional round at CenturyLink Field.

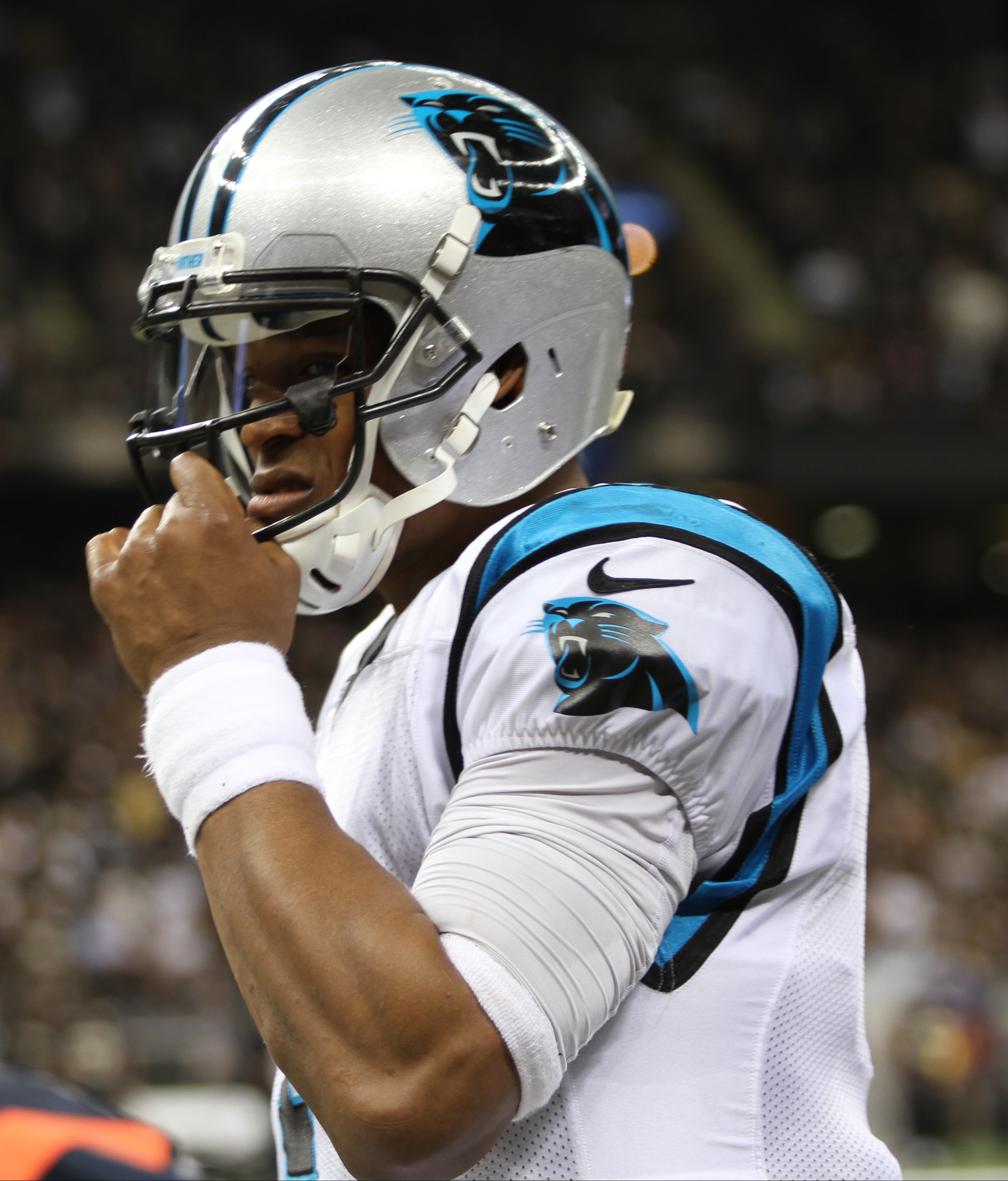
Cam Newton led Carolina to a franchise-best 15–1 record and its second NFC championship in 2015.

Carolina finished a franchise-best 15–1, opened the season with 14 consecutive wins, and won its third consecutive NFC South title. Cam Newton accounted for 45 combined passing and rushing touchdowns and was named Associated Press NFL Most Valuable Player and Offensive Player of the Year; Rivera earned his second Associated Press NFL Coach of the Year award.

After a first-round bye, Carolina defeated the Seattle Seahawks 31–24 in the divisional round and the Arizona Cardinals 49–15 in the NFC Championship Game, giving the Panthers their second NFC championship and first Super Bowl appearance since Super Bowl XXXVIII. In Super Bowl 50, played at Levi's Stadium in Santa Clara, California, Carolina lost 24–10 to the Denver Broncos.

=== Post-Super Bowl decline and Richardson's decision to sell: 2016–2017 ===
After failing to reach a long-term agreement with cornerback Josh Norman, the Panthers rescinded his franchise tag; he subsequently signed with the Washington Redskins.

Carolina went 6–10 in 2016, ending its three-year run as NFC South champion and its streak of three consecutive playoff appearances.

During the offseason, quarterback Cam Newton underwent surgery to repair a partially torn rotator cuff in his throwing shoulder, and defensive end Julius Peppers returned to Carolina, the team that had selected him second overall in the 2002 NFL draft. Carolina selected running back Christian McCaffrey eighth overall in the 2017 NFL draft.

The Panthers also changed general managers shortly before training camp. On July 17, owner Jerry Richardson relieved general manager Dave Gettleman of his duties, and Carolina hired former general manager Marty Hurney as interim general manager two days later.

In December, the Panthers announced an internal investigation into Richardson's workplace conduct, and Sports Illustrated later reported that former team employees had received confidential settlements connected to allegations including sexual harassment and the use of a racial slur. On December 17, Richardson announced that he would put the Panthers up for sale after the season, and the next day Tina Becker was named chief operating officer and took over day-to-day management of the organization.

An 11–5 record earned Carolina second place in the NFC South and a wild-card berth. In the wild-card round, the Panthers lost 31–26 to the New Orleans Saints at the Mercedes-Benz Superdome.

=== Ownership transition and end of the Rivera era: 2018–2019 ===
In May 2018, NFL owners approved the sale of the Panthers to David Tepper, a hedge fund manager and minority owner of the Pittsburgh Steelers. The following month, the NFL's investigation into then-owner Jerry Richardson substantiated the workplace-misconduct allegations against him, found no evidence of comparable conduct by other Panthers employees, and led the league to fine Richardson $2.75 million. The transaction closed on July 9, making Tepper the second owner in franchise history.

Carolina began the 2018 season 6–2 but lost seven consecutive games as quarterback Cam Newton dealt with an injury to his throwing shoulder. The Panthers finished 7–9 and missed the playoffs.

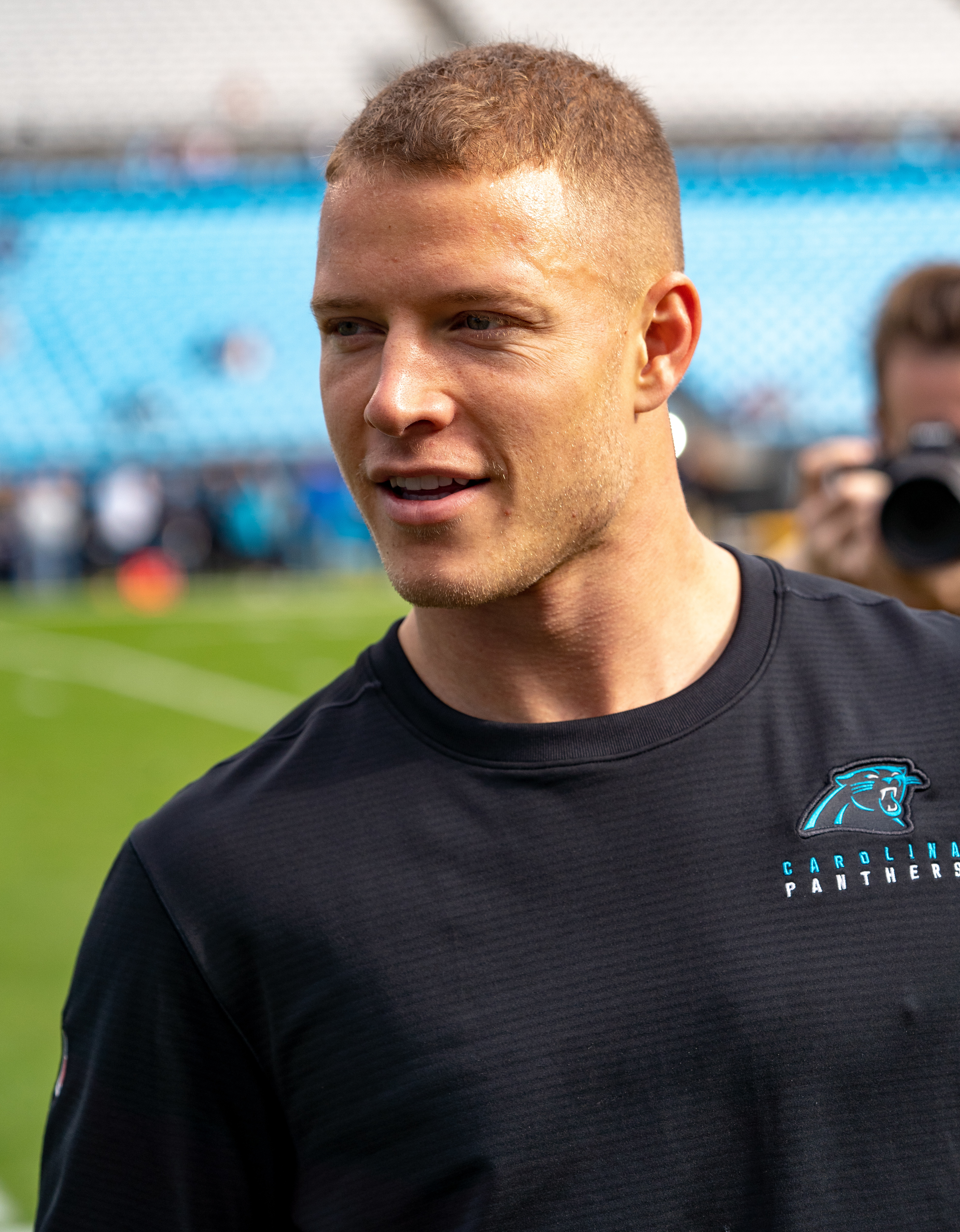
Christian McCaffrey became the third player in NFL history to record 1,000 rushing yards and 1,000 receiving yards in the same season in 2019.

During the 2019 offseason, defensive end Julius Peppers retired after 17 NFL seasons, including 10 with Carolina, and linebacker Thomas Davis left after 14 seasons with the team.

Newton aggravated a left foot injury early in the season and was placed on injured reserve after two starts, with Kyle Allen becoming the primary starter. On October 13, Carolina defeated the Tampa Bay Buccaneers at Tottenham Hotspur Stadium in London, the Panthers' first regular-season game outside the United States.

McCaffrey finished with 1,387 rushing yards and 1,005 receiving yards, becoming the third player in NFL history to record 1,000 rushing yards and 1,000 receiving yards in the same season. The Associated Press named him first-team All-Pro at both running back and flex.

After a 5–3 start, Carolina lost its final eight games and finished 5–11. The Panthers dismissed head coach Ron Rivera on December 3 and named secondary coach Perry Fewell interim head coach for the final four games. Rivera ended his Panthers tenure with a 76–63–1 regular-season record, four playoff appearances, three NFC South titles, and one Super Bowl appearance.

== Coaching changes under Tepper: 2020–2023 ==
From 2020 through 2023, Carolina missed the playoffs in each season during a period of repeated changes at head coach and quarterback. The Panthers dismissed Matt Rhule in 2022 and Frank Reich in 2023 before either completed the season, and the period ended with a franchise-record sixth consecutive losing season.

=== Matt Rhule era: 2020–2022 ===
The Panthers hired former Baylor and Temple head coach Matt Rhule as the fifth full-time head coach in franchise history on January 7, 2020. One week later, linebacker Luke Kuechly announced his retirement after eight seasons with Carolina.

==== Roster overhaul and continued losing seasons: 2020–2021 ====
Before Rhule's first season, Carolina released longtime quarterback Cam Newton and signed Teddy Bridgewater. The Panthers also became the first team in the common draft era to use every draft selection on defense. Carolina went 5–11 for a second consecutive season, and general manager Marty Hurney was fired in December.

The Panthers hired Scott Fitterer as general manager in January 2021, traded for quarterback Sam Darnold, and later re-signed Newton after Darnold was injured. Carolina used three starting quarterbacks and lost its final seven games to finish 5–12.

==== 2022 season ====
Construction on the Panthers' planned $800 million headquarters and practice complex in Rock Hill, South Carolina, stopped in 2022 amid a dispute over public-infrastructure financing. The project was abandoned, and a federal judge later approved a bankruptcy settlement of about $100 million.

Carolina acquired quarterback Baker Mayfield in July, and Mayfield, P. J. Walker, and Sam Darnold all started games during the season. In August, former Panthers linebacker and linebackers coach Sam Mills was posthumously enshrined in the Pro Football Hall of Fame.

After a 1–4 start, the Panthers dismissed Rhule and named defensive pass game coordinator and secondary coach Steve Wilks interim head coach. Rhule finished his Carolina tenure with an 11–27 regular-season record. Later in October, Carolina traded running back Christian McCaffrey to the San Francisco 49ers for four draft picks.

Under Wilks, Carolina went 6–6 and remained in contention for the NFC South title until Week 17. The Panthers finished 7–10, second in the division, and missed the playoffs for a fifth consecutive season.

=== Frank Reich and Chris Tabor: 2023 ===
The Panthers hired former Indianapolis Colts head coach Frank Reich in January 2023. Reich, the franchise's first starting quarterback in 1995, became the first Panthers head coach with an offensive background.

Before the 2023 NFL draft, Carolina acquired the first overall pick from the Chicago Bears for wide receiver D. J. Moore and four draft picks, including its 2024 first-round selection. The Panthers used the pick to select Alabama quarterback Bryce Young.

After a 1–10 start, Carolina dismissed Reich and named Chris Tabor interim head coach. The Panthers finished an NFL-worst 2–15, and the first overall pick in the 2024 NFL draft went to Chicago through the trade used to acquire Young.

== Dave Canales era: 2024–present ==
In January 2024, the Panthers named former Carolina linebacker and assistant general manager Dan Morgan president of football operations and general manager, and hired former Tampa Bay Buccaneers offensive coordinator Dave Canales as the seventh head coach in franchise history.

Canales inherited a 2–15 team that had missed the playoffs for six consecutive seasons and did not hold a first-round pick in the 2024 NFL draft.

=== 2024 season ===
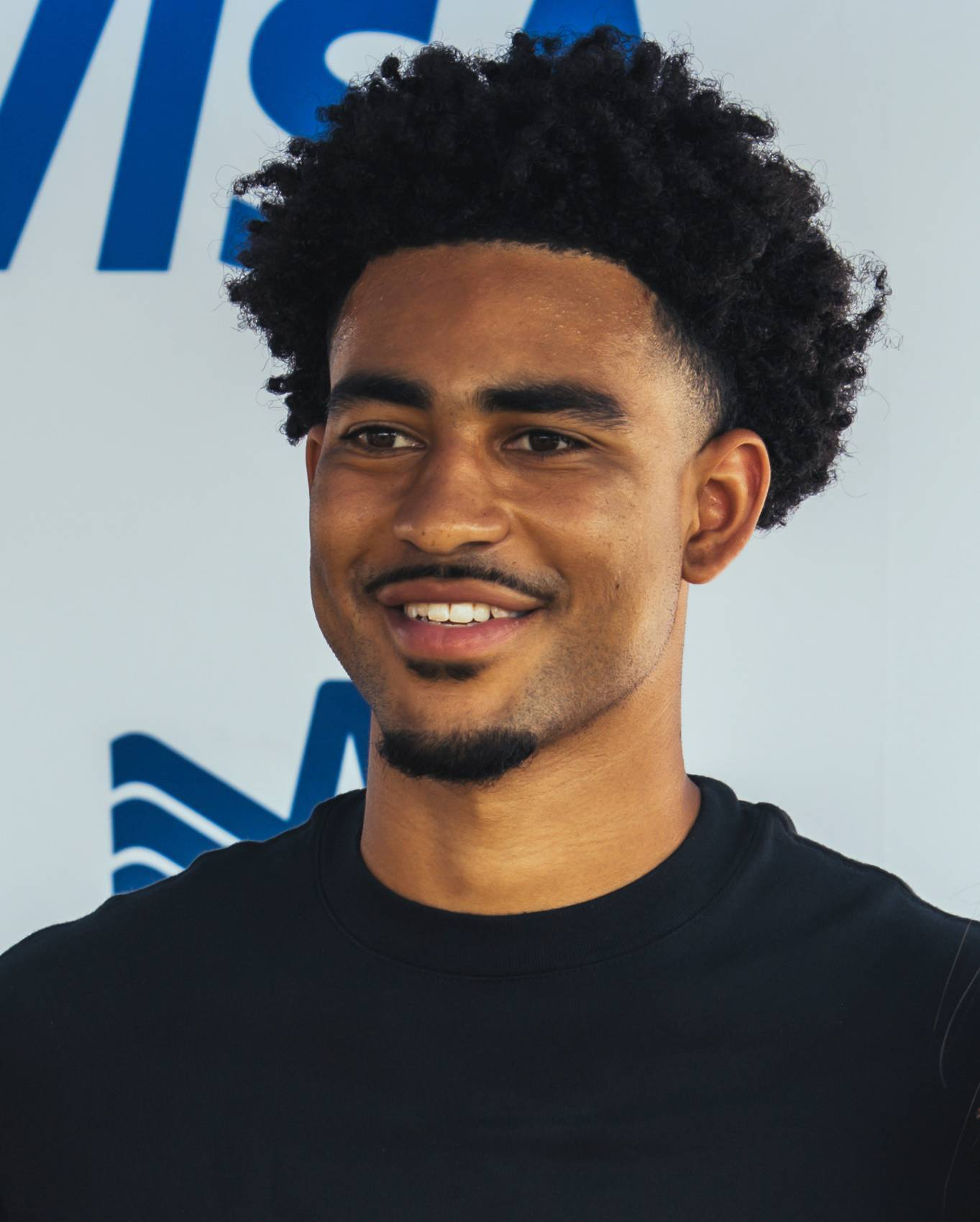
Bryce Young, pictured at Camp Lejeune in 2024, was selected first overall by Carolina in 2023

In June, the Charlotte City Council approved an $800 million renovation agreement for Bank of America Stadium, with up to $650 million from the city and $150 million from Tepper Sports & Entertainment. The agreement included a 20-year relocation restriction with an early-termination option after 15 years, along with upgrades to the stadium's seating, concourses, technology, accessibility, and public areas.

In August, former Panthers defensive end Julius Peppers was enshrined in the Pro Football Hall of Fame, becoming the first player drafted by Carolina to receive the honor.

After an 0–2 start, Canales benched Bryce Young for Andy Dalton. Young returned after Dalton was injured and remained the starter for the rest of the season. Carolina finished 5–12 (tied with rival New Orleans Saints) and 3rd in the NFC South (due to winning a strength of victory tiebreaker over the Saints), while allowing an NFL single-season record of 534 points over the 17-game schedule.

=== 2025 season ===
At 8–9, the Panthers won the NFC South through a three-team tiebreaker with the Tampa Bay Buccaneers and Atlanta Falcons. It was Carolina's first division title since 2015 and its first playoff berth since 2017. In the wild-card round, Carolina hosted the Los Angeles Rams and lost 34–31, despite beating them earlier 31–28 in week 13 of the regular season.

Rookie wide receiver Tetairoa McMillan was named Associated Press NFL Offensive Rookie of the Year. In February 2026, former Panthers linebacker Luke Kuechly was elected to the Pro Football Hall of Fame's Class of 2026.
