= 1984 NFL draft =

National Football League draft

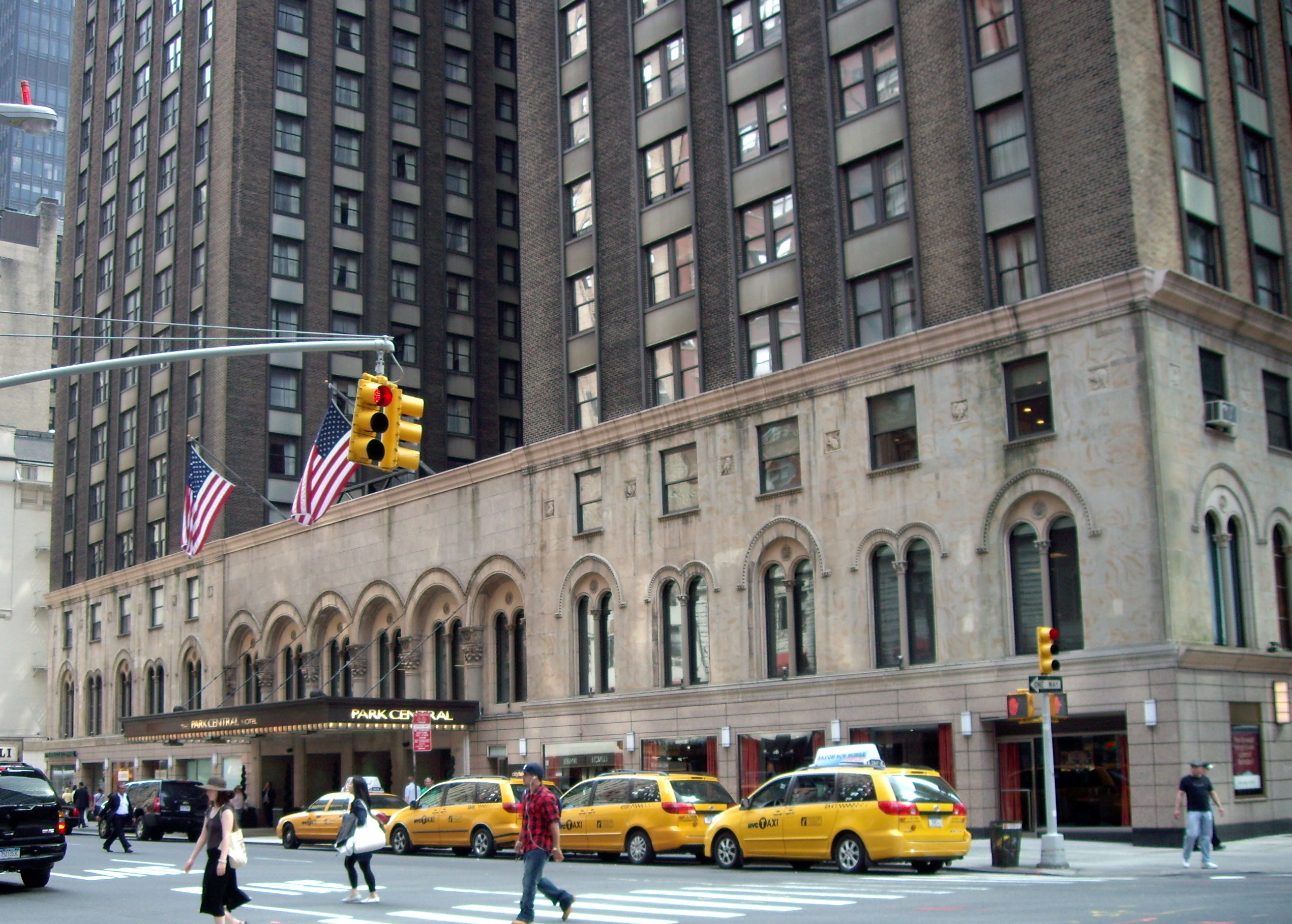
- Park Central Hotel (draft venue), photographed in 2010

General information
- Date: May 1–2, 1984
- Location: Omni Park Central Hotel in New York City, New York
- Network: ESPN

Overview
- 336 total selections in 12 rounds
- League: National Football League
- First selection: Irving Fryar, WR; New England Patriots
- Mr. Irrelevant: Randy Essington, QB; Los Angeles Raiders
- Most selections (15): Cincinnati Bengals; Dallas Cowboys; Detroit Lions; Kansas City Chiefs; New York Jets
- Fewest selections (8): Los Angeles Raiders
- Hall of Famers: none

The 1984 NFL draft was the procedure by which National Football League teams selected amateur college football players. It is officially known as the NFL Annual Player Selection Meeting. The draft was held May 1–2, 1984, at the Omni Park Central Hotel in New York City, New York. No teams elected to claim any players in the regular supplemental draft that year. However, the NFL did have a special supplemental draft for college seniors who had already signed with the United States Football League or Canadian Football League on June 5, 1984.

The 1984 draft was the first in ten years in which a quarterback was not selected in the first round. It is also one of three NFL drafts to not produce any inductees to the Pro Football Hall of Fame, along with the 1943 and 1992 drafts.

== Player selections ==
*	Compensatory selection
†	Pro Bowler
‡	Hall of Famer

Positions key
Offense	Defense	Special teams
QB — Quarterback; RB — Running back; FB — Fullback; WR — Wide receiver; TE — Tight end; OL — Offensive lineman; T — Tackle; G — Guard; C — Center	DL — Defensive lineman; DT — Defensive tackle (Note: Includes nose tackle (NT)); DE — Defensive end; EDGE — Edge rusher; LB — Linebacker (Note: Includes middle linebacker (MLB/MIKE), weakside linebacker (WILL), strongside linebacker (SAM), off-ball linebacker, and outside linebacker (OLB)); DB — Defensive back; CB — Cornerback; S — Safety (Note: Includes free safety (FS) and strong safety (SS))	K — Kicker (Note: Also known as a placekicker (PK)); P — Punter; LS — Long snapper; RS — Return specialist (Note: Includes kickoff and punt returners)

Rnd.	Pick	Team	Player	Pos.	College	Notes
1	1	New England Patriots	Irving Fryar ^{†}	WR	Nebraska	from Tampa Bay via Cincinnati (Note: No. 1: Multiple trades: No. 1: Tampa Bay → Cincinnati (PD). Tampa Bay traded a first-round selection (1st overall) to Cincinnati in exchange for QB Jack Thompson. No. 1: Cincinnati → New England (PD). Cincinnati traded a first-round selection (1st overall) to New England for two first-round selections and a tenth-round selection (16th, 28th and 265th overall), and a 1985 fifth-round selection.)
1	2	Houston Oilers	Dean Steinkuhler	G	Nebraska	
1	3	New York Giants	Carl Banks ^{†}	LB	Michigan State	
1	4	Philadelphia Eagles	Kenny Jackson	WR	Penn State	
1	5	Kansas City Chiefs	Bill Maas ^{†}	DT	Pittsburgh	
1	6	San Diego Chargers	Mossy Cade	S	Texas	
1	7	Cincinnati Bengals	Ricky Hunley	LB	Arizona	
1	8	Indianapolis Colts	Leonard Coleman	S	Vanderbilt	
1	9	Atlanta Falcons	Rick Bryan	DE	Oklahoma	
1	10	New York Jets	Russell Carter	S	SMU	
1	11	Chicago Bears	Wilber Marshall ^{†}	LB	Florida	
1	12	Green Bay Packers	Alphonso Carreker	DE	Florida State	
1	13	Minnesota Vikings	Keith Millard ^{†}	DT	Washington State	
1	14	Miami Dolphins	Jackie Shipp	LB	Oklahoma	from Buffalo (Note: No. 14: Buffalo → Miami (D). Buffalo traded a first-round selection (14th overall) to Miami in exchange for a first-round selection and two third-round selections (26th, 79th and 82nd overall).)
1	15	New York Jets	Ron Faurot	DE	Arkansas	from New Orleans (Note: No. 15: New Orleans → NY Jets (PD). New Orleans traded a first-round selection (15th overall) to the NY Jets in exchange for QB Richard Todd.)
1	16	Cincinnati Bengals	Pete Koch	DE	Maryland	from New England (Note: No. 16: New England → Cincinnati (PD). see No. 1: Cincinnati → New England.)
1	17	St. Louis Cardinals	Clyde Duncan	WR	Tennessee	
1	18	Cleveland Browns	Don Rogers	S	UCLA	
1	19	Indianapolis Colts	Ron Solt ^{†}	G	Maryland	from Denver (Note: No. 19: Denver → Indianapolis (PD). Denver traded a first-round selection (19th overall), OT Chris Hinton and QB Mark Hermann to Indianapolis in exchange for QB John Elway.)
1	20	Detroit Lions	David Lewis	TE	California	
1	21	Kansas City Chiefs	John Alt ^{†}	T	Iowa	from LA Rams (Note: No. 21: LA Rams → Kansas City (PD). The LA Rams traded first- and fifth-round selections (21st and 134th overall) to Kansas City in exchange for CB Gary Green.)
1	22	Seattle Seahawks	Terry Taylor	CB	Southern Illinois	
1	23	Pittsburgh Steelers	Louis Lipps ^{†}	WR	Southern Miss	
1	24	San Francisco 49ers	Todd Shell	LB	BYU	
1	25	Dallas Cowboys	Billy Cannon Jr.	LB	Texas A&M	
1	26	Buffalo Bills	Greg Bell ^{†}	RB	Notre Dame	from Miami (Note: No. 26: Miami → Buffalo (D). see No. 14: Buffalo → Miami.)
1	27	New York Giants	William Roberts ^{†}	G	Ohio State	from Washington (Note: No. 27: Washington → NY Giants (PD). Washington traded a first-round selection (27th overall) to the NY Giants in exchange for second- and fifth-round selections (31st and 125th overall).)
1	28	Cincinnati Bengals	Brian Blados	T	North Carolina	from LA Raiders via New England (Note: No. 28: Multiple trades: No. 28: LA Raiders → New England (PD). The LA Raiders traded a first-round selection (28th overall) and a 1985 second-round selection to New England in exchange for a seventh-round selection (192nd overall) and CB Mike Haynes. No. 28: New England → Cincinnati (PD). see No. 1: Cincinnati → New England.)
2	29	Houston Oilers	Doug Smith	DT	Auburn	
2	30	Tampa Bay Buccaneers	Keith Browner	LB	USC	
2	31	Washington Redskins	Bob Slater	LB	Oklahoma	from NY Giants (Note: No. 31: NY Giants → Washington (D). see No. 27: Washington → NY Giants.)
2	32	Atlanta Falcons	Scott Case ^{†}	S	Oklahoma	from Philadelphia (Note: No. 32: Philadelphia → Atlanta (PD). Philadelphia traded a second-round selection (32nd overall) to Atlanta in exchange for LB Joel Williams.)
2	33	San Diego Chargers	Mike Guendling	LB	Northwestern	
2	34	Kansas City Chiefs	Scott Radecic	LB	Penn State	
2	35	Indianapolis Colts	Blaise Winter	DT	Syracuse	
2	36	Atlanta Falcons	Thomas Benson	LB	Oklahoma	
2	37	New York Jets	Jim Sweeney	C	Pittsburgh	
2	38	Cincinnati Bengals	Boomer Esiason ^{†}	QB	Maryland	
2	39	New York Jets	Glenn Dennison	TE	Miami (FL)	from Green Bay via San Diego (Note: No. 39: Multiple trades: No. 39: Green Bay → San Diego (PD). Green Bay traded a second-round selection (39th overall), 1982 first- and second-round selections, a 1983 first-round selection and WR Aundra Thompson to San Diego in exchange for WR John Jefferson and a 1982 first-round selection. No. 39: San Diego → NY Jets (PD). San Diego traded a second-round selection (39th overall) to the NY Jets in exchange for DT Abdul Salaam and DE Kenny Neil.)
2	40	Dallas Cowboys	Victor Scott	CB	Colorado	from Minnesota via Houston (Note: No. 40: Multiple trades: No. 40: Minnesota → Houston (PD). Minnesota traded second- and fourth-round selections (40th and 100th overall) to Houston in exchange for QB Archie Manning and TE Dave Casper. No. 40: Houston → Dallas (PD). Houston traded a second-round selection (40th overall), a 1985 fifth-round selection and WR Mike Renfro to Dallas in exchange for a second-round selection (54th overall) and WR Butch Johnson.)
2	41	Buffalo Bills	Eric Richardson	WR	San Jose State	
2	42	New Orleans Saints	Jumpy Geathers	DE	Wichita State	
2	43	New England Patriots	Ed Williams	LB	Texas	
2	44	Chicago Bears	Ron Rivera	LB	California	
2	45	St. Louis Cardinals	Doug Dawson	G	Texas	
2	46	Denver Broncos	Andre Townsend	DE	Ole Miss	
2	47	Detroit Lions	Pete Mandley	WR	Northern Arizona	
2	48	Cleveland Browns	Chris Rockins	S	Oklahoma State	from LA Rams (Note: No. 48: LA Rams → Cleveland (PD). The LA Rams traded a second-round selection (48th overall) to Cleveland in exchange for the rights to WR Ron Brown.)
2	49	Seattle Seahawks	Daryl Turner	WR	Michigan State	
2	50	Cleveland Browns	Bruce Davis	WR	Baylor	
2	51	Los Angeles Raiders	Sean Jones ^{†}	DE	Northeastern	from San Francisco (Note: No. 51: San Francisco → LA Raiders (D). San Francisco traded a second-round selection (51st overall) to the LA Raiders in exchange for second- and fifth-round selections (56th and 139th overall).)
2	52	Pittsburgh Steelers	Chris Kolodziejski	TE	Wyoming	
2	53	Miami Dolphins	Jay Brophy	LB	Miami (FL)	
2	54	Houston Oilers	Bo Eason	S	UC Davis	from Dallas (Note: No. 54: Dallas → Houston (PD). see No. 40: Houston → Dallas.)
2	55	Washington Redskins	Steve Hamilton	DE	East Carolina	
2	56	San Francisco 49ers	John Frank	TE	Ohio State	from LA Raiders (Note: No. 56: LA Raiders → San Francisco (D). see No. 51: San Francisco → LA Raiders.)
3	57	Tampa Bay Buccaneers	Fred Acorn	CB	Texas	
3	58	Houston Oilers	Johnny Meads	LB	Nicholls State	
3	59	New York Giants	Jeff Hostetler ^{†}	QB	West Virginia	
3	60	Philadelphia Eagles	Rusty Russell	T	South Carolina	
3	61	Kansas City Chiefs	Herman Heard	RB	Southern Colorado	
3	62	Detroit Lions	Eric Williams	DT	Washington State	from San Diego via St. Louis (Note: No. 62: Multiple trades: No. 62: San Diego → St. Louis (PD). San Diego traded third- and eighth-round selections (62nd and 201st overall) to St. Louis in exchange for S Ken Greene. No. 62: St. Louis → Detroit (PD). St. Louis traded a third-round selection (62nd overall) and DE Mike Dawson to Detroit in exchange for DE Al Baker.)
3	63	Atlanta Falcons	Rod McSwain	CB	Clemson	
3	64	New York Jets	Kyle Clifton	LB	TCU	
3	65	Cincinnati Bengals	Stanford Jennings	RB	Furman	
3	66	Indianapolis Colts	Chris Scott	DT	Purdue	
3	67	Minnesota Vikings	Alfred Anderson	RB	Baylor	
3	68	New Orleans Saints	Terry Hoage	S	Georgia	from Buffalo (Note: No. 68: Buffalo → New Orleans (PD). Buffalo traded a third-round selection (68th overall) to New Orleans in exchange for S Tom Myers.)
3	69	New Orleans Saints	Tyrone Anthony	RB	North Carolina	
3	70	New England Patriots	Jonathan Williams	RB	Penn State	
3	71	Chicago Bears	Stefan Humphries	G	Michigan	
3	72	Green Bay Packers	Donnie Humphrey	DT	Auburn	
3	73	San Francisco 49ers	Guy McIntyre ^{†}	G	Georgia	from St. Louis (Note: No. 73: St. Louis → San Francisco (D). St. Louis traded a third-round selection (73rd overall) to San Francisco in exchange for third- and fifth-round selections (80th and 136rd overall).)
3	74	Detroit Lions	Ernest Anderson	RB	Oklahoma State	
3	75	Detroit Lions	Steve Baack	DE	Oregon	from LA Rams (Note: No. 75: LA Rams → Detroit (PD). The LA Rams traded a third-round selection (75th overall) to Detroit in exchange for TE David Hill.)
3	76	Seattle Seahawks	Fredd Young ^{†}	LB	New Mexico State	
3	77	Buffalo Bills	Rodney Bellinger	CB	Miami (FL)	from Cleveland (Note: No. 77: Cleveland → Buffalo (PD). Cleveland traded a third-round selection (77th overall), a 1983 first-round selection and a 1985 fifth-round selection to Buffalo in exchange for the rights to LB Tom Cousineau.)
3	78	Denver Broncos	Tony Lilly	S	Florida	
3	79	Buffalo Bills	Sean McNanie	DE	San Diego State	from Pittsburgh via Miami (Note: No. 79: Multiple trades: No. 79: Pittsburgh → Miami (PD). Pittsburgh traded a third-round selection (79th overall) to Miami in exchange for QB David Woodley. No. 79: Miami → Buffalo (D).see No. 14: Buffalo → Miami.)
3	80	St. Louis Cardinals	Rick McIvor	QB	Texas	from San Francisco (Note: No. 80: San Francisco → St. Louis (D). see No. 73: St. Louis → San Francisco.)
3	81	Dallas Cowboys	Fred Cornwell	TE	USC	
3	82	Buffalo Bills	Speedy Neal	RB	Miami (FL)	from Miami (Note: No. 82: Miami → Buffalo (PD). see No. 14: Buffalo → Miami.)
3	83	Washington Redskins	Jay Schroeder ^{†}	QB	UCLA	
3	84	Los Angeles Raiders	Joe McCall	RB	Pittsburgh	
4	85	Houston Oilers	Mark Studaway	DE	Tennessee	
4	86	Seattle Seahawks	Rickey Hagood	DT	South Carolina	from Tampa Bay via San Francisco (Note: No. 86: Tampa Bay → San Francisco → Seattle. Multiple trades: Tampa Bay → San Francisco (PD). Tampa Bay traded a fourth-round selection (86th overall) to San Francisco in exchange for a 1983 sixth-round selection. San Francisco → Seattle (PD). San Francisco traded a fourth-round selection (86th overall) and a 1985 tenth-round selection to Seattle in exchange for DT Manu Tuiasosopo.)
4	87	New York Giants	Conrad Goode	T	Missouri	
4	88	Philadelphia Eagles	Evan Cooper	CB	Michigan	
4	89	Denver Broncos	Randy Robbins	CB	Arizona	from San Diego via Tampa Bay (Note: No. 89: San Diego → Tampa Bay → Denver. Multiple trades: San Diego → Tampa Bay (PD). San Diego traded a fourth-round selection (89th overall) to Tampa Bay in exchange for LB Dewey Selmon. Tampa Bay → Denver (PD). Tampa Bay traded a fourth-round selection (89th overall) and a conditional 1985 selection to Denver in exchange for QB Steve DeBerg.)
4	90	Kansas City Chiefs	Mark Robinson	S	Penn State	
4	91	New York Jets	Bobby Bell	LB	Missouri	
4	92	Cincinnati Bengals	John Farley	RB	Sacramento State	
4	93	Indianapolis Colts	Craig Curry	CB	Texas	
4	94	Atlanta Falcons	Rydell Malancon	LB	LSU	
4	95	Buffalo Bills	Mitchell Brookins	WR	Illinois	
4	96	Cleveland Browns	Rickey Bolden	TE	SMU	from New Orleans via Denver (Note: No. 96: New Orleans → Denver → Cleveland. Multiple trades: New Orleans → Denver (PD). New Orleans traded a fourth-round selection (96th overall) to Denver in exchange for Kelvin Clark. Denver → Cleveland (PD). Denver traded a fourth-round selection (96th overall) to Cleveland in exchange for WR Dave Logan.)
4	97	New Orleans Saints	Joel Hilgenberg ^{†}	C	Iowa	from New England (Note: No. 97: New England → New Orleans (PD). New England traded a fourth-round selection (97th overall) to New Orleans in exchange for 1983 ninth-, tenth-, eleventh- and twelfth-round selections.)
4	98	Chicago Bears	Tom Andrews	G	Louisville	
4	99	Green Bay Packers	John Dorsey	LB	UConn	
4	100	Houston Oilers	Patrick Allen	CB	Utah State	from Minnesota (Note: No. 100: Minnesota → Houston (PD). See Round 2: Minnesota → Houston.)
4	101	St. Louis Cardinals	Martin Bayless	S	Bowling Green	
4	102	Washington Redskins	Jimmy Smith	RB	Elon	from LA Rams via Houston (Note: No. 102: LA Rams → Houston → Washington. Multiple trades: LA Rams → Houston (PD). The LA Rams traded a fourth-round selection (102nd overall), and 1983 first- and fourth-round selections to Houston in exchange for a 1983 first-round selection. Houston → Washington (??). Houston traded a fourth-round selection (102nd overall) to Washington in exchange for a 1985 third-round selection.)
4	103	Indianapolis Colts	George Wonsley	RB	Mississippi State	from Seattle (Note: No. 103: Seattle → Indianapolis (PD). Seattle traded a fourth-round selection (103rd overall) to Indianapolis in exchange for WR Roger Carr.)
4	104	Cleveland Browns	Brian Brennan	WR	Boston College	
4	105	New York Giants	Gary Reasons	LB	Northwestern State	from Denver (Note: No. 105: Denver → NY Giants (PD). Denver traded a fourth-round selection (105th overall) to the NY Giants in exchange for QB Scott Brunner.)
4	106	Detroit Lions	Dave D'Addio	RB	Maryland	
4	107	Tampa Bay Buccaneers	Mike Gunter	RB	Tulsa	from San Francisco via San Diego (Note: No. 107: San Francisco → San Diego → Tampa Bay. Multiple trades: San Francisco → San Diego (PD). San Francisco traded a fourth-round selection (107th overall) to San Diego in exchange for RB Amos Lawrence. San Diego → Tampa Bay (PD). San Diego traded a fourth-round selection (107th overall) and a 1982 third-round selection to Tampa Bay in exchange for LB Dave Lewis.)
4	108	Pittsburgh Steelers	Weegie Thompson	WR	Florida State	
4	109	Miami Dolphins	Joe Carter	RB	Alabama	
4	110	Dallas Cowboys	Steve DeOssie	LB	Boston College	
4	111	Pittsburgh Steelers	Terry Long	G	East Carolina	from Washington (Note: No. 111: Washington → Pittsburgh (PD). Washington traded a fourth-round selection (111th overall) to Pittsburgh in exchange for CB Anthony Washington.)
4	112	Tampa Bay Buccaneers	Ron Heller	T	Penn State	from LA Raiders (Note: No. 112: LA Raiders → Tampa Bay (PD). The LA Raiders traded a fourth-round selection (112th overall) and DE Dave Browning to Tampa Bay in exchange for OL Charley Hannah.)
5	113	Dallas Cowboys	Steve Pelluer	QB	Washington	from Tampa Bay (Note: No. 113: Tampa Bay → Dallas (PD). Tampa Bay traded a fifth-round selection (113th overall) to Dallas in exchange for LB Danny Spradlin.)
5	114	Houston Oilers	Robert Lyles	LB	TCU	
5	115	New York Giants	Clint Harris	CB	East Carolina	
5	116	Philadelphia Eagles	Andre Hardy	RB	St. Mary's (CA)	
5	117	Kansas City Chiefs	Eric Holle	DE	Texas	
5	118	San Diego Chargers	Lionel James	RB	Auburn	
5	119	Cincinnati Bengals	Barney Bussey	S	South Carolina State	
5	120	Indianapolis Colts	Golden Tate	WR	Tennessee State	
5	121	San Francisco 49ers	Michael Carter ^{†}	DT	SMU	from Atlanta (Note: No. 121: Atlanta → San Francisco (D). Atlanta traded a fifth-round selection (121st overall) to San Francisco in exchange for fifth- and sixth-round selections (132nd and 163rd overall).)
5	122	New York Jets	Tron Armstrong	WR	Eastern Kentucky	
5	123	New Orleans Saints	Jitter Fields	DB	Texas	
5	124	New England Patriots	Paul Fairchild	G	Kansas	
5	125	Washington Redskins	Jeff Pegues	LB	East Carolina	from Chicago via San Diego, Seattle and NY Giants (Note: No. 125: Chicago → San Diego → Seattle → NY Giants → Washington. Multiple trades: Chicago → San Diego (PD). Chicago traded a fifth-round selection (125th overall) and a 1983 twelfth-round selection to San Diego in exchange for OL Jeff Williams. San Diego → Seattle (PD). San Diego traded a fifth-round selection (125th overall) and a 1985 fifth-round selection to Seattle in exchange for WR Roger Carr and RB Sherman Smith. Seattle → NY Giants (PD). Seattle traded a fifth-round selection (125th overall) to the NY Giants in exchange for CB Terry Jackson. NY Giants → Washington (D). See Round 1: Washington → NY Giants.)
5	126	Green Bay Packers	Tom Flynn	S	Pittsburgh	
5	127	Los Angeles Raiders	Andy Parker	TE	Utah	from Minnesota (Note: No. 127: Minnesota → LA Raiders (??). Minnesota traded a fifth-round selection (127th overall) to the LA Raiders in exchange for fifth-, seventh- and eleventh-round selections (140th, 196th and 308th overall).)
5	128	Buffalo Bills	John Kidd	P	Northwestern	
5	129	St. Louis Cardinals	Jeff Leiding	LB	Texas	
5	130	Indianapolis Colts	Kevin Call	T	Colorado State	from Seattle (Note: No. 130: Seattle → Indianapolis (PD). Seattle traded a fifth-round selection (130th overall) to Indianapolis in exchange for G Robert Pratt.)
5	131	Cleveland Browns	Dave Piepkorn	T	North Dakota State	
5	132	Atlanta Falcons	Cliff Benson	TE	Purdue	from Denver via San Francisco (Note: No. 132: Denver → San Francisco → Atlanta. Multiple trades: Denver → San Francisco (PD). Denver traded a fifth-round selection (132nd overall) to San Francisco in exchange for TE Eason Ramson. San Francisco → Atlanta (D). See Round 5: Atlanta → San Francisco.)
5	133	Los Angeles Rams	Hal Stephens	DE	East Carolina	from Detroit (Note: No. 133: Detroit → LA Rams (PD). Detroit traded a fifth-round selection (133rd overall) to the LA Rams in exchange for DT Mike Fanning.)
5	134	Kansas City Chiefs	Jeff Paine	LB	Texas A&M	from LA Rams (Note: No. 134: LA Rams → Kansas City (D). See Round 1: LA Rams → Kansas City.)
5	135	Pittsburgh Steelers	Van Hughes	DT	Southwest Texas State	
5	136	St. Louis Cardinals	John Goode	TE	Youngstown State	from San Francisco (Note: No. 136: San Francisco → St. Louis (D). See Round 3: St. Louis → San Francisco.)
5	137	Dallas Cowboys	Norm Granger	RB	Iowa	
5	138	Miami Dolphins	Dean May	QB	Louisville	
5	139	San Francisco 49ers	Jeff Fuller	LB	Texas A&M	from Washington via LA Raiders (Note: No. 139: Washington → LA Raiders → San Francisco. Multiple trades: Washington → LA Raiders (PD). Washington traded a fifth-round selection (139th overall) to the LA Raiders in exchange for a sixth-round selection (166th overall). LA Raiders → San Francisco (D). See Round 2: San Francisco → LA Raiders.)
5	140	Minnesota Vikings	Allen Rice	RB	Baylor	from LA Raiders (Note: No. 140: LA Raiders → Minnesota (??). See Round 5: Minnesota → LA Raiders.)
6	141	Houston Oilers	John Grimsley ^{†}	LB	Kentucky	
6	142	Tampa Bay Buccaneers	Chris Washington	LB	Iowa State	
6	143	New York Giants	Jim Scott	DE	Clemson	
6	144	Philadelphia Eagles	Scott Raridon	T	Nebraska	
6	145	San Diego Chargers	Keith Guthrie	DT	Texas A&M	
6	146	Kansas City Chiefs	Rufus Stevens	WR	Grambling	
6	147	Indianapolis Colts	Dwight Beverly	RB	Illinois	
6	148	Atlanta Falcons	Ben Bennett	QB	Duke	
6	149	New York Jets	Tony Paige	RB	Virginia Tech	
6	150	Cincinnati Bengals	Don Kern	TE	Arizona State	
6	151	New England Patriots	Ernest Gibson	DB	Furman	
6	152	Dallas Cowboys	Eugene Lockhart	LB	Houston	from Chicago (Note: No. 152: Chicago → Dallas (PD). Chicago traded a sixth-round selection (152nd overall) to Dallas in exchange for TE Jay Saldi.)
6	153	Green Bay Packers	Randy Wright	QB	Wisconsin	
6	154	Minnesota Vikings	Dwight Collins	WR	Pittsburgh	
6	155	Buffalo Bills	Tony Slaton	C	USC	
6	156	New Orleans Saints	Don Thorp	DT	Illinois	
6	157	St. Louis Cardinals	Rod Clark	LB	Southwest Texas State	
6	158	Cleveland Browns	Terry Nugent	QB	Colorado State	
6	159	Denver Broncos	Aaron Smith	LB	Utah State	
6	160	Detroit Lions	John Witkowski	QB	Columbia	
6	161	Houston Oilers	Eric Mullins	WR	Stanford	from LA Rams (Note: No. 161: LA Rams → Houston (PD). The LA Rams traded a sixth-round selection (161st overall) to Houston in exchange for RB Dwayne Crutchfield.)
6	162	Seattle Seahawks	John Kaiser	LB	Arizona	
6	163	Atlanta Falcons	Dan Ralph	DT	Oregon	from San Francisco (Note: No. 163: San Francisco → Atlanta (D). See Round 5: Atlanta → San Francisco.)
6	164	Pittsburgh Steelers	Chris Brown	DB	Notre Dame	
6	165	Miami Dolphins	Rowland Tatum	LB	Ohio State	
6	166	Dallas Cowboys	Joe Levelis	G	Iowa	
6	167	Washington Redskins	Curt Singer	T	Tennessee	
6	168	Los Angeles Raiders	Stacey Toran	DB	Notre Dame	
7	169	Tampa Bay Buccaneers	Jay Carroll	TE	Minnesota	
7	170	Houston Oilers	Willie Joyner	RB	Maryland	
7	171	New York Giants	Lionel Manuel	WR	Pacific	
7	172	Philadelphia Eagles	Joe Hayes	RB	Central State (OK)	
7	173	Kansas City Chiefs	Kevin Ross ^{†}	CB	Temple	
7	174	San Diego Chargers	Jesse Bendross	WR	Alabama	
7	175	Atlanta Falcons	Kirk Dodge	LB	UNLV	
7	176	New York Jets	Harry Hamilton	DB	Penn State	
7	177	Cincinnati Bengals	Leo Barker	LB	New Mexico State	
7	178	Detroit Lions	Jimmie Carter	LB	New Mexico	from Indianapolis (Note: No. 178: Indianapolis → Detroit (PD). Indianapolis traded a seventh-round selection (178th overall) to Detroit in exchange for OT Karl Baldischwiler.)
7	179	Chicago Bears	Nakita Robertson	RB	Central Arkansas	
7	180	Minnesota Vikings	John Haines	DT	Texas	
7	181	Green Bay Packers	Daryll Jones	DB	Georgia	
7	182	Buffalo Bills	Stan David	DB	Texas Tech	
7	183	Los Angeles Raiders	Mitch Willis	DE	SMU	from New Orleans (Note: No. 183: New Orleans → LA Raiders (PD). New Orleans sent a seventh-round selection (183rd overall) to the LA Raiders as compensation for signing RB Tim Wilson off waivers.)
7	184	New England Patriots	Bruce Kallmeyer	K	Kansas	
7	185	St. Louis Cardinals	Quentin Walker	RB	Virginia	
7	186	Denver Broncos	Clarence Kay	TE	Georgia	
7	187	Detroit Lions	Renwick Atkins	T	Kansas	
7	188	Los Angeles Rams	George Radachowsky	DB	Boston College	
7	189	Seattle Seahawks	Sam Slater	T	Weber State	
7	190	Cleveland Browns	Jim Dumont	LB	Rutgers	
7	191	Pittsburgh Steelers	Scott Campbell	QB	Purdue	
7	192	New England Patriots	Derwin Williams	WR	New Mexico	from San Francisco (Note: No. 192: San Francisco → New England (PD). San Francisco traded a seventh-round selection (192nd overall), a 1985 eighth-round selection and a 1986 seventh-round selection to New England in exchange for QB Matt Cavanaugh.)
7	193	Dallas Cowboys	Ed Martin	LB	Indiana State	
7	194	Miami Dolphins	Bernard Carvalho	G	Hawaii	
7	195	Washington Redskins	Mark Smith	WR	North Carolina	
7	196	Minnesota Vikings	Loyd Lewis	G	Texas A&I	from LA Raiders (Note: No. 196: LA Raiders → Minnesota (??). See Round 5: Minnesota → LA Raiders.)
8	197	Houston Oilers	Kevin Baugh	WR	Penn State	
8	198	Tampa Bay Buccaneers	Fred Robinson	DE	Miami (FL)	
8	199	San Diego Chargers	Ray Woodard	DT	Texas	from NY Giants (Note: No. 199: NY Giants → San Diego (PD). The NY Giants traded an eighth-round selection (199th overall) to San Diego in exchange for S Pete Shaw.)
8	200	Philadelphia Eagles	Manny Matsakis	K	Capital	
8	201	St. Louis Cardinals	Niko Noga	LB	Hawaii	from San Diego (Note: No. 201: San Diego → St. Louis (PD). See Round 3: San Diego → St. Louis.)
8	202	Kansas City Chiefs	Randy Clark	DB	Florida	
8	203	New York Jets	Billy Griggs	TE	Virginia	
8	204	Cincinnati Bengals	Bruce Reimers	T	Iowa State	
8	205	Indianapolis Colts	Eugene Daniel	DB	LSU	
8	206	Atlanta Falcons	Jeff Jackson	LB	Auburn	
8	207	Denver Broncos	Winford Hood	T	Georgia	from Green Bay (Note: No. 207: Green Bay → Denver (PD). Green Bay traded an eighth-round selection (207th overall) to Denver in exchange for DL Greg Boyd.)
8	208	Minnesota Vikings	Paul Sverchek	DT	Cal Poly	
8	209	Buffalo Bills	Stacy Rayfield	DB	Texas–Arlington	
8	210	New Orleans Saints	Clemon Terrell	RB	Southern Miss	
8	211	New England Patriots	James Keyton	T	Arizona State	
8	212	Chicago Bears	Brad Anderson	WR	Arizona	
8	213	St. Louis Cardinals	Bob Paulling	K	Clemson	
8	214	Detroit Lions	David Jones	C	Texas	
8	215	Los Angeles Rams	Ed Brady	LB	Illinois	
8	216	Seattle Seahawks	John Puzar	C	Long Beach State	
8	217	New York Jets	Bret Wright	P	Southeastern Louisiana	from Cleveland (Note: No. 217: Cleveland → NY Jets (PD). Cleveland traded an eighth-round selection (217th overall) to the NY Jets in exchange for WR Bobby Jones.)
8	218	Denver Broncos	Scott Garnett	DT	Washington	
8	219	San Diego Chargers	Bob Craighead	RB	Northeast Louisiana	from San Francisco (Note: No. 219: San Francisco → San Diego (PD). San Francisco traded eighth- and twelfth-round selections (219th and 331st overall), and a conditional 1985 ninth-round selection to San Diego in exchange for DT Louie Kelcher.)
8	220	Pittsburgh Steelers	Randy Rassmussen	C	Minnesota	
8	221	Miami Dolphins	Ronnie Landry	RB	McNeese State	
8	222	Dallas Cowboys	Mike Revell	RB	Bethune–Cookman	
8	223	Washington Redskins	Jeff Smith	DB	Missouri	
8	224	Los Angeles Raiders	Sam Seale	WR	Western State (CO)	
9	225	Tampa Bay Buccaneers	Rick Mallory	G	Washington	
9	226	Houston Oilers	Jeff Donaldson	DB	Colorado	
9	227	Houston Oilers	Mike Johnson	DE	Illinois	from NY Giants (Note: No. 227: NY Giants → Houston (PD). The NY Giants traded a ninth-round selection (227th overall) to Houston in exchange for 1983 eleventh- and twelfth-round selections.)
9	228	Cleveland Browns	Don Jones	WR	Texas A&M	from Philadelphia (Note: No. 228: Philadelphia → Cleveland (PD). Philadelphia traded a ninth-round selection (228th overall) to Cleveland in exchange for LB Bill Cowher.)
9	229	Kansas City Chiefs	Scott Auer	T	Michigan State	
9	230	San Diego Chargers	Zack Barnes	DT	Alabama State	
9	231	Cincinnati Bengals	Bruce Kozerski	C	Holy Cross	
9	232	Dallas Cowboys	John Hunt	G	Florida	from Indianapolis (Note: No. 232: Indianapolis → Dallas (PD). Indianapolis traded a ninth-round selection (232nd overall) to Dallas in exchange for K Raúl Allegre.)
9	233	Atlanta Falcons	Glen Howe	T	Southern Miss	
9	234	New York Jets	Tom Baldwin	DT	Tulsa	
9	235	Minnesota Vikings	Keith Kidd	WR	Arkansas	
9	236	Buffalo Bills	Leroy Howell	DE	Appalachian State	
9	237	New Orleans Saints	Brian Hansen ^{†}	P	Sioux Falls	
9	238	New England Patriots	Scott Bolzan	T	Northern Illinois	
9	239	San Francisco 49ers	Lee Miller	DB	Cal State Fullerton	from Chicago (Note: No. 239: Chicago → San Francisco (PD). Chicago sent ninth- and twelfth-round selections (239th and 320th overall) to San Francisco after OL Jeff Williams failed a physical following an earlier trade.)
9	240	Kansas City Chiefs	Dave Hestera	TE	Colorado	from Green Bay (Note: No. 240: Green Bay → Kansas City (PD). Green Bay traded a ninth-round selection (240th overall) to Kansas City in exchange for OL Charlie Getty.)
9	241	St. Louis Cardinals	John Walker	RB	Texas	
9	242	Los Angeles Rams	George Reynolds	P	Penn State	
9	243	Seattle Seahawks	Adam Schreiber	G	Texas	
9	244	Chicago Bears	Mark Casale	QB	Montclair State	from Cleveland (Note: No. 244: Cleveland → Chicago (D). Cleveland traded ninth-, tenth-, eleventh- and twelfth-round selections (244th, 271st, 297th and 330th overall) to Chicago in exchange for first-, second- and third-round selections in the 1984 NFL supplemental draft of USFL and CFL players.)
9	245	Denver Broncos	Chris Brewer	RB	Arizona	
9	246	Detroit Lions	Rich Hollins	WR	West Virginia	
9	247	Pittsburgh Steelers	Rich Erenberg	RB	Colgate	
9	248	San Francisco 49ers	Derrick Harmon	RB	Cornell	
9	249	Dallas Cowboys	Neil Maune	G	Notre Dame	
9	250	Miami Dolphins	Jim Boyle	T	Tulane	
9	251	New England Patriots	David Windham	LB	Jackson State	from Washington (Note: No. 251: Washington → New England (PD). Washington traded a ninth-round selection (251st overall) to New England in exchange for DE Tony McGee.)
9	252	Houston Oilers	Mike Russell	LB	Toledo	from LA Raiders (Note: No. 252: LA Raiders → Houston (PD). The LA Raiders traded RB Tim Wilson to Houston in exchange for an eleventh-round selection (282nd overall); the Raiders sent a ninth-round selection (252nd overall) to Houston after Wilson was waived prior to the 1983 season.)
10	253	Los Angeles Rams	Norwood Vann	TE	East Carolina	from Houston (Note: No. 253: Houston → LA Rams (PD). Houston traded a tenth-round selection (253rd overall) to the LA Rams in exchange for OT Doug France.)
10	254	Tampa Bay Buccaneers	Jim Gallery	K	Minnesota	
10	255	New York Giants	David Jordan	G	Auburn	
10	256	Philadelphia Eagles	John Thomas	DB	TCU	
10	257	New York Giants	Heyward Golden	DB	South Carolina State	from San Diego (Note: No. 257: San Diego → NY Giants (PD). San Diego traded a tenth-round selection (257th overall) to the NY Giants in exchange for LB Brian Kelley.)
10	258	Kansas City Chiefs	Al Wenglikowski	LB	Pittsburgh	
10	259	Detroit Lions	William Frizzell	DB	North Carolina Central	from Indianapolis (Note: No. 259: Indianapolis → Detroit (PD). Indianapolis traded a tenth-round selection (259th overall) to Detroit in exchange for WR Tracy Porter.)
10	260	Atlanta Falcons	Derrick Franklin	DB	Fresno State	
10	261	New York Jets	Ronny Cone	RB	Georgia Tech	
10	262	Cincinnati Bengals	Aaron Jackson	LB	North Carolina	
10	263	Buffalo Bills	Joe Azelby	LB	Harvard	
10	264	New Orleans Saints	Paul Gray	LB	Western Kentucky	
10	265	Cincinnati Bengals	Brent Ziegler	RB	Syracuse	from New England (Note: No. 265: New England → Cincinnati (PD). See Round 1: Cincinnati → New England.)
10	266	Chicago Bears	Kurt Vestman	TE	Idaho	
10	267	Green Bay Packers	Gary Hoffman	T	Santa Clara	
10	268	Minnesota Vikings	James Spencer	LB	Oklahoma State	
10	269	St. Louis Cardinals	Mark Smythe	DT	Indiana	
10	270	Seattle Seahawks	Randall Morris	RB	Tennessee	
10	271	Chicago Bears	Shaun Gayle ^{†}	S	Ohio State	from Cleveland (Note: No. 271: Cleveland → Chicago (D). See Round 9: Cleveland → Chicago.)
10	272	Denver Broncos	Bobby Micho	TE	Texas	
10	273	Detroit Lions	James Thaxton	DB	Louisiana Tech	
10	274	Los Angeles Rams	Joe Dooley	C	Ohio State	
10	275	San Francisco 49ers	Dave Moritz	WR	Iowa	
10	276	Pittsburgh Steelers	Kirk McJunkin	T	Texas	
10	277	Miami Dolphins	John Chesley	TE	Oklahoma State	
10	278	Dallas Cowboys	Brian Salonen	TE	Montana	
10	279	Washington Redskins	Keith Griffin	RB	Miami (FL)	
10	280	Cleveland Browns	Earnest Byner ^{†}	RB	East Carolina	from LA Raiders (Note: No. 280: LA Raiders → Cleveland (PD). The LA Raiders traded a tenth-round selection (280th overall) to Cleveland in exchange for OL Henry Sheppard.)
11	281	Tampa Bay Buccaneers	Blair Kiel	QB	Notre Dame	
11	282	Los Angeles Raiders	Gardner Williams	DB	Saint Mary's (CA)	from Houston (Note: No. 282: Houston → LA Raiders (PD). See Round 9: LA Raiders → Houston.)
11	283	New York Giants	Frank Cephous	RB	UCLA	
11	284	Philadelphia Eagles	John Robertson	T	East Carolina	
11	285	Kansas City Chiefs	Bobby Johnson	RB	San Jose State	
11	286	San Diego Chargers	Buford McGee	RB	Ole Miss	
11	287	Atlanta Falcons	Tommy Norman	WR	Jackson State	
11	288	New York Jets	Dan Martin	T	Iowa State	
11	289	Cincinnati Bengals	Steve McKeaver	RB	Central State (OK)	
11	290	Indianapolis Colts	Bob Stowe	T	Illinois	
11	291	New Orleans Saints	Michel Bourgeau	DE	Boise State	
11	292	New England Patriots	Charlie Flager	G	Washington State	
11	293	Los Angeles Rams	Michael Harper	RB	USC	from Chicago (Note: No. 293: Chicago → LA Rams (PD). Chicago traded an eleventh-round selection (293rd overall) and a 1985 sixth-round selection to the LA Rams in exchange for QB Steve Fuller.)
11	294	Green Bay Packers	Mark Cannon	C	Texas–Arlington	
11	295	Minnesota Vikings	Edgar Pickett	LB	Clemson	
11	296	St. Louis Cardinals	Kyle Mackey	QB	East Texas State	in place of Buffalo (time expired) (Note: No. 296: Buffalo held the 296th pick, but did not make their selection in the allotted time. By rule, they could make a selection at any time afterwards, but St. Louis, Chicago and Denver were able to make their own picks before Buffalo could make their own.)
11	297	Chicago Bears	Mark Butkus	DT	Illinois	from Cleveland; (Note: No. 297: Cleveland → Chicago (D). See Round 9: Cleveland → Chicago.) in place of Buffalo (time expired) (Note: No. 297: See No. 296.)
11	298	Denver Broncos	Gene Lang	RB	LSU	in place of Buffalo (time expired) (Note: No. 298: See No. 296.)
11	299	Buffalo Bills	Craig White	WR	Missouri	instead of No. 296 (time expired) (Note: No. 299: See No. 296.)
11	300	Detroit Lions	Mike Saxon	P	San Diego State	
11	301	Los Angeles Rams	Dwyane Love	RB	Houston	
11	302	Seattle Seahawks	Steve Gemza	T	UCLA	
11	303	Pittsburgh Steelers	Elton Veals	RB	Tulane	
11	304	Dallas Cowboys	Dowe Aughtman	DT	Auburn	in place of San Francisco (time expired) (Note: No. 304: San Francisco held the 304th pick, but did not make their selection in the allotted time. By rule, they could make a selection at any time afterwards, but Dallas, Miami and Washington were able to make their own picks before San Francisco could make their own.)
11	305	Miami Dolphins	Bud Brown	DB	Southern Miss	in place of San Francisco (time expired) (Note: No. 305: See No. 304.)
11	306	Washington Redskins	Anthony Jones	TE	Wichita State	in place of San Francisco (time expired) (Note: No. 306: See No. 304.)
11	307	San Francisco 49ers	Kirk Pendleton	WR	BYU	instead of No. 304 (time expired) (Note: No. 307: See No. 304.)
11	308	Minnesota Vikings	Lawrence Thompson	WR	Miami (FL)	from LA Raiders (Note: No. 308: LA Raiders → Minnesota (??). See Round 5: Minnesota → LA Raiders.)
12	309	Los Angeles Rams	Rod Fisher	DB	Oklahoma State	from Houston (Note: No. 309: Houston → LA Rams (??). Houston traded a twelfth-round selection (309th overall) to the LA Rams in exchange for past considerations.)
12	310	Tampa Bay Buccaneers	Thad Jemison	WR	Ohio State	
12	311	New York Giants	Lawrence Green	LB	Chattanooga	
12	312	Philadelphia Eagles	Paul McFadden	K	Youngstown State	
12	313	Green Bay Packers	Lenny Taylor	WR	Tennessee	from San Diego (Note: No. 313: San Diego → Green Bay (PD). San Diego traded a twelfth-round selection (313th overall) in exchange for OL Derrel Gofourth.)
12	314	Kansas City Chiefs	Mark Lang	LB	Texas	
12	315	New York Jets	David Roberson	WR	Houston	
12	316	Cincinnati Bengals	Steve Raquet	LB	Holy Cross	
12	317	Indianapolis Colts	Steve Hathaway	DE	West Virginia	
12	318	Atlanta Falcons	Don Holmes	WR	Mesa	
12	319	New England Patriots	Harper Howell	WR	UCLA	
12	320	Miami Dolphins	William Devane	DT	Clemson	from Chicago via San Francisco (Note: No. 320: Chicago → San Francisco → Miami. Multiple trades: Chicago → San Francisco (PD). See Round 9: Chicago → San Francisco. San Francisco → Miami (PD). San Francisco traded a twelfth-round selection (320th overall) to Miami in exchange for P Tom Orosz.)
12	321	Minnesota Vikings	Mike Jones	RB	North Carolina A&T	in place of Green Bay (time expired) (Note: No. 321: Green Bay held the 321st pick, but did not make their selection in the allotted time. By rule, they could make a selection at any time afterwards, but Minnesota and Buffalo were able to make their own picks before Green Bay could make their own.)
12	322	Buffalo Bills	Russell Davis	TE	Maryland	in place of Green Bay (time expired) (Note: No. 322: See No. 321.)
12	323	Green Bay Packers	Mark Emans	LB	Bowling Green	instead of No. 321 (time expired) (Note: No. 323: See No. 321.)
12	324	New Orleans Saints	Byron Nelson	T	Arizona	
12	325	St. Louis Cardinals	Paul Parker	G	Oklahoma	
12	326	Denver Broncos	Murray Jarman	WR	Clemson	
12	327	Detroit Lions	Glenn Streno	C	Tennessee	
12	328	Los Angeles Rams	Moe Bias	LB	Illinois	
12	329	Seattle Seahawks	Theodis Windham	DB	Utah State	
12	330	Chicago Bears	Donald Jordan	RB	Houston	from Cleveland (Note: No. 330: Cleveland → Chicago (D). See Round 9: Cleveland → Chicago.)
12	331	San Diego Chargers	Paine Harper	WR	LaVerne	from San Francisco (Note: No. 331: San Francisco → San Diego (PD). See Round 8: San Diego → San Francisco.)
12	332	Pittsburgh Steelers	Scoop Gillespie	RB	William Jewell	
12	333	Miami Dolphins	Mike Weingrad	LB	Illinois	
12	334	Dallas Cowboys	Carl Lewis	WR	Houston	Ran track and field
12	335	Washington Redskins	Curtland Thomas	WR	Missouri	
12	336	Los Angeles Raiders	Randy Essington	QB	Colorado	

== Hall of Famers ==
To date, no member of the 1984 NFL draft has been inducted into the Pro Football Hall of Fame.

== Notable undrafted players ==
†	Selected for the Pro Bowl

Original NFL team	Player	Pos.	College	Notes
Atlanta Falcons	David Archer	QB	Iowa State	
Atlanta Falcons	Dean Biasucci ^{†}	K	Western Carolina	
Atlanta Falcons	Mike Landrum	TE	Southern Miss	
Buffalo Bills	Mark Jackson	CB	Abilene Christian	
Chicago Bears	Mark Rodenhauser	C	Illinois State	
Cincinnati Bengals	Clay Pickering	WR	Maine	
Cleveland Browns	Mike Nease	G	Chattanooga	
Dallas Cowboys	Vince Albritton	S	Washington	
Dallas Cowboys	Roy Bennett	CB	Jackson State	
Dallas Cowboys	Carl Howard	CB	Rutgers	
Dallas Cowboys	Perry Kemp	WR	California (PA)	
Dallas Cowboys	Vince Rafferty	C	Colorado	
Dallas Cowboys	Jimmie Turner	LB	Presbyterian	
Denver Broncos	Jerry Diorio	TE	Michigan	
Denver Broncos	Greg Kragen ^{†}	DT	Utah State	
Denver Broncos	Chris Norman	P	South Carolina	
Denver Broncos	Scott Stankavage	QB	North Carolina	
Detroit Lions	Carl Bland	WR	Virginia Union	
Detroit Lions	Todd Hons	QB	Arizona State	
Detroit Lions	Jon Roehlk	G	Iowa	
Green Bay Packers	Tony DeLuca	DE	Rhode Island	
Green Bay Packers	Ed West	TE	Auburn	
Houston Oilers	Doug Kellermeyer	T	BYU	
Houston Oilers	Allen Lyday	S	Nebraska	
Indianapolis Colts	Ricky Turner	QB	Washington State	
Kansas City Chiefs	Don Bracken	P	Michigan	
Kansas City Chiefs	Jeff Colter	DB	Kansas	
Kansas City Chiefs	E. J. Jones	FB	Kansas	
Kansas City Chiefs	David Little	TE	Middle Tennessee State	
Kansas City Chiefs	Sandy Osiecki	QB	Arizona State	
Kansas City Chiefs	Leonard Williams	RB	Western Carolina	
Los Angeles Raiders	Ken Rose	LB	UNLV	
Los Angeles Rams	Shawn Miller	DE	Utah State	
Los Angeles Raiders	Joe Prokop	P	Cal Poly Pomona	
Miami Dolphins	Al Del Greco	K	Auburn	
New York Giants	Phil McConkey	WR	Navy	
New York Giants	Elvis Patterson	CB	Kansas	
New York Giants	Eric Schubert	K	Pittsburgh	
New York Jets	Dennis Bligen	RB	St. John's (NY)	
Philadelphia Eagles	Harry Flaherty	LB	Holy Cross	
Philadelphia Eagles	Mike Reichenbach	LB	East Stroudsburg	
Philadelphia Eagles	Andre Waters	S	Cheyney	
Pittsburgh Steelers	Mark Catano	DT	Valdosta State	
Pittsburgh Steelers	Ben Lawrence	G	IUP	
Pittsburgh Steelers	Darrell Nelson	TE	Memphis	
Pittsburgh Steelers	Todd Spencer	RB	USC	
Pittsburgh Steelers	Robert Williams	S	Eastern Illinois	
San Diego Chargers	Rick Neuheisel	QB	UCLA	
Seattle Seahawks	Sherman Cocroft	CB	San Jose State	
Seattle Seahawks	Melvin Jenkins	CB	Cincinnati	
Washington Redskins	Don Goodman	RB	Cincinnati	
Washington Redskins	Jay Pennison	C	Nicholls State	

== Trades ==
In the explanations below, (D) denotes trades that took place during the 1984 Draft, while (PD) indicates trades completed pre-draft.

Round 1

Round 2

Round 3

Round 4

Round 5

Round 6

Round 7

Round 8

Round 9

Round 10

Round 11

Round 12
