= 1983 Texas Longhorns football team =

American college football season

1983 Texas Longhorns football

SWC champion

Cotton Bowl Classic, L 9–10 vs. Georgia
- Conference: Southwest Conference

Ranking
- Coaches: No. 5
- AP: No. 5
- Record: 11–1 (8–0 SWC)
- Head coach: Fred Akers (7th season)
- Offensive coordinator: Ron Toman (3rd season)
- Defensive coordinator: David McWilliams (2nd season)
- Home stadium: Texas Memorial Stadium

1983 Southwest Conference football standings
	Conf.					Overall
Team	W		L		T	W		L		T
No. 5 Texas $	8	–	0	–	0	11	–	1	–	0
No. 12 SMU	7	–	1	–	0	10	–	2	–	0
Baylor	4	–	3	–	1	7	–	4	–	1
Texas A&M	4	–	3	–	1	5	–	5	–	1
Arkansas	4	–	4	–	0	6	–	5	–	0
Texas Tech	3	–	4	–	1	3	–	7	–	1
Houston	3	–	5	–	0	4	–	7	–	0
TCU	1	–	6	–	1	1	–	8	–	2
Rice	0	–	8	–	0	1	–	10	–	0
$ – Conference champion; Rankings from AP Poll

The 1983 Texas Longhorns football team represented the University of Texas at Austin as a member of the Southwest Conference (SWC) during the 1983 NCAA Division I-A football season. Led by seventh-year head coach Fred Akers, the Longhorns compiled an overall record of 11–1 with a mark of 8–0 in conference play, winning the SWC title. Texas earned a berth in the Cotton Bowl Classic, where the #2 Longhorns lost to Georgia. Due to a loss by #1 Nebraska in the Orange Bowl, a win by Texas would've likely resulted in a National Championship. The team played home games at Texas Memorial Stadium in Austin, Texas.

== Schedule ==
Date	Time	Opponent	Rank	Site	TV	Result	Attendance	Source
September 17	11:30 a.m.	at No. 5 Auburn*	No. 3	Jordan–Hare Stadium; Auburn, AL	CBS	W 20–7	73,500	
September 24	7:00 p.m.	No. 9 (I-AA) North Texas State*	No. 2	Texas Memorial Stadium; Austin, TX		W 26–6	71,202	
October 1	7:00 p.m.	Rice	No. 2	Texas Memorial Stadium; Austin, TX (rivalry)		W 42–6	70,005	
October 8	2:00 p.m.	vs. No. 8 Oklahoma*	No. 2	Cotton Bowl; Dallas, TX (Red River Shootout)		W 28–16	75,587	
October 15	11:30 a.m.	at Arkansas	No. 2	War Memorial Stadium; Little Rock, AR (rivalry)	CBS	W 31–3	54,882	
October 22	2:30 p.m.	at No. 9 SMU	No. 2	Texas Stadium; Irving, TX	CBS	W 15–12	63,805	
October 29	1:00 p.m.	Texas Tech	No. 2	Texas Memorial Stadium; Austin, TX (rivalry)		W 20–3	75,402	
November 5	2:00 p.m.	at Houston	No. 2	Houston Astrodome; Houston, TX		W 9–3	47,103	
November 12	1:00 p.m.	TCU	No. 2	Texas Memorial Stadium; Austin, TX (rivalry)		W 20–14	61,156	
November 19	1:00 p.m.	Baylor	No. 2	Texas Memorial Stadium; Austin, TX (rivalry)		W 24–21	76,208	
November 26	11:30 a.m.	at Texas A&M	No. 2	Kyle Field; College Station, TX (rivalry)	ABC	W 45–13	76,751	
January 2, 1984	12:30 p.m.	vs. No. 7 Georgia*	No. 2	Cotton Bowl; Dallas, TX (Cotton Bowl Classic)	CBS	L 9–10	67,891	
*Non-conference game; Rankings from AP Poll released prior to the game; All times are in Central time

== 1983 team players in the NFL draft ==
The following players were selected in the 1984 NFL draft following the season.

Player	Position	Round	Pick	Franchise
Mossy Cade	Safety	1	6	San Diego Chargers
Ed Williams	Linebacker	2	43	New England Patriots
Doug Dawson	Offensive guard	2	45	St. Louis Cardinals
Fred Acorn	Cornerback	3	57	Tampa Bay Buccaneers
Rick McIvor	Quarterback	3	80	St. Louis Cardinals
Craig Curry	Cornerback	4	93	Indianapolis Colts
Eric Holle	Defensive end	5	117	Kansas City Chiefs
Jitter Fields	Defensive back	5	123	New Orleans Saints
Jeff Leiding	Linebacker	5	129	St. Louis Cardinals
John Haines	Defensive tackle	7	180	Minnesota Vikings
Ray Woodard	Defensive tackle	8	199	San Diego Chargers
David Jones	Center	8	214	Detroit Lions
John Walker	Running back	9	241	St. Louis Cardinals
Adam Schreiber	Offensive guard	9	243	Seattle Seahawks
Bobby Micho	Tight end	10	272	Denver Broncos
Kirk McJunkin	Tackle	10	276	Pittsburgh Steelers
Mark Lang	Linebacker	12	314	Kansas City Chiefs
