= 1984 Minnesota Vikings season =

NFL team season

- General manager: Mike Lynn
- Head coach: Les Steckel
- Home stadium: Metrodome

Results
- Record: 3–13
- Division place: 5th NFC Central
- Playoffs: Did not qualify
- All-Pros: K Jan Stenerud (2nd team)
- Pro Bowlers: K Jan Stenerud

Uniform
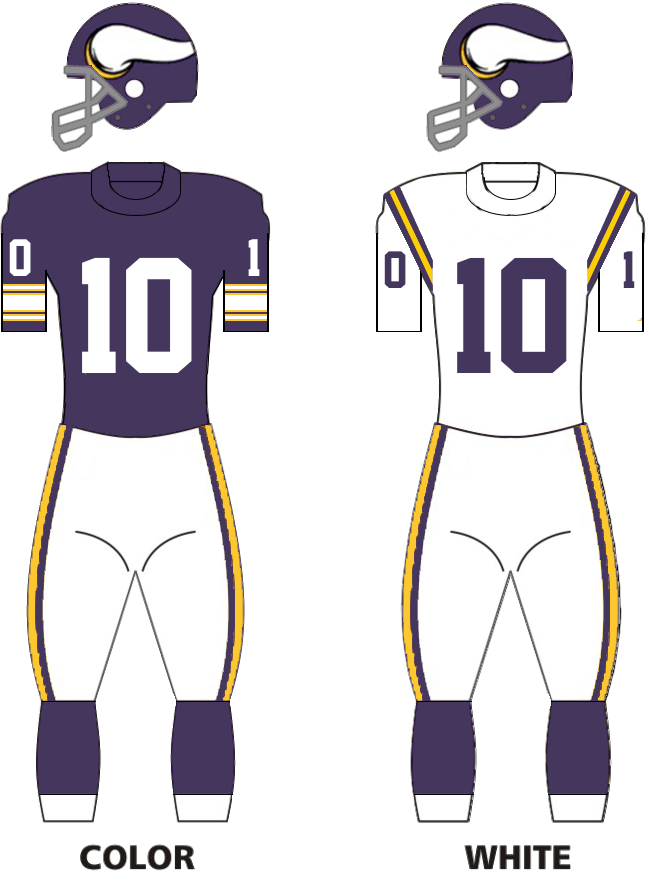

The 1984 season was the Minnesota Vikings' 24th in the National Football League. The Vikings finished with a 3–13 record, their worst record since the AFL–NFL merger, later equaled by the 2011 team, and the team's second worst overall record by win percentage (only 1962 was worse).

The Vikings' 484 points allowed (30.3 average points per game) was the most by any NFL team between 1983 and 2000, and the most any Vikings team allowed in one season. At the time, it was the third-most allowed in a 16-game season, trailing only the 1981 Baltimore Colts (533, since surpassed by the 2024 Carolina Panthers with 534) and 1980 New Orleans Saints (487).

The team was coached by Les Steckel after Bud Grant retired; after the bad season, Steckel was fired and Bud Grant was re-hired.

== Offseason ==
=== 1984 draft ===
Pro Bowler

1984 Minnesota Vikings Draft
Draft order		Player name	Position	College	Notes
Round	Selection	Player name	Position	College	Notes
1	13	Keith Millard	Defensive tackle	Washington State	
2	40	Traded to the Houston Oilers (Note: The Vikings traded second- and fourth-round selections (40th and 100th overall) to the Houston Oilers in exchange for QB Archie Manning and TE Dave Casper.)			
3	67	Alfred Anderson	Running back	Baylor	
4	100	Traded to the Houston Oilers			
5	127	Traded to the Los Angeles Raiders (Note: The Vikings traded a fifth-round selection (127th overall) to the Los Angeles Raiders in exchange for fifth-, seventh-, and eleventh-round selections (140th, 196th and 308th overall).)			
5	140	Allen Rice	Running back	Baylor	from Raiders
6	154	Dwight Collins	Wide receiver	Pittsburgh	
7	181	John Haines	Defensive tackle	Texas	
7	196	Lloyd Lewis	Guard	Texas A&I	from Raiders
8	208	Paul Sverchek	Defensive tackle	Cal Poly	
9	235	Keith Kidd	Wide receiver	Arkansas	
10	268	James Spencer	Linebacker	Oklahoma State	
11	295	Edgar Pickett	Linebacker	Clemson	
11	308	Lawrence Thompson	Wide receiver	Miami (FL)	from Raiders
12	321	Mike Jones	Running back	North Carolina A&T	Originally Packers pick (Note: The Vikings were due to pick 322nd overall but the Packers passed, allowing the Vikings to move up one spot.)

=== 1984 supplemental draft ===
1984 Minnesota Vikings Supplemental USFL/CFL Draft
Draft order		Player name	Position	College	Pro team
Round	Selection	Player name	Position	College	Pro team
1	13	Allanda Smith	Cornerback	TCU	Los Angeles Express
2	40	Robert Smith	Defensive end	Grambling State	Arizona Wranglers
3	67	David Howard	Linebacker	Long Beach State	Los Angeles Express

== Preseason ==
Week	Date	Opponent	Result	Record	Venue	Attendance
1	August 4	Atlanta Falcons	W 37–6	1–0	Hubert H. Humphrey Metrodome	51,693
2	August 11	Miami Dolphins	L 7–29	1–1	Hubert H. Humphrey Metrodome	54,003
3	August 18	Philadelphia Eagles	L 10–31	1–2	Hubert H. Humphrey Metrodome	51,743
4	August 24	at St. Louis Cardinals	L 0–31	1–3	Busch Memorial Stadium	31,210

== Regular season ==
=== Schedule ===
Week	Date	Opponent	Result	Record	Venue	Attendance
1	September 2	San Diego Chargers	L 13–42	0–1	Hubert H. Humphrey Metrodome	57,276
2	September 9	at Philadelphia Eagles	L 17–19	0–2	Veterans Stadium	55,942
3	September 16	Atlanta Falcons	W 27–20	1–2	Hubert H. Humphrey Metrodome	53,955
4	September 23	at Detroit Lions	W 29–28	2–2	Silverdome	57,511
5	September 30	Seattle Seahawks	L 12–20	2–3	Hubert H. Humphrey Metrodome	57,171
6	October 7	at Tampa Bay Buccaneers	L 31–35	2–4	Tampa Stadium	47,405
7	October 14	at Los Angeles Raiders	L 20–23	2–5	Los Angeles Memorial Coliseum	49,276
8	October 21	Detroit Lions	L 14–16	2–6	Hubert H. Humphrey Metrodome	57,953
9	October 28	at Chicago Bears	L 7–16	2–7	Soldier Field	57,517
10	November 4	Tampa Bay Buccaneers	W 27–24	3–7	Hubert H. Humphrey Metrodome	54,949
11	November 11	at Green Bay Packers	L 17–45	3–8	Milwaukee County Stadium	52,931
12	November 18	at Denver Broncos	L 21–42	3–9	Mile High Stadium	74,716
13	November 25	Chicago Bears	L 3–34	3–10	Hubert H. Humphrey Metrodome	56,881
14	November 29	Washington Redskins	L 17–31	3–11	Hubert H. Humphrey Metrodome	55,017
15	December 8	at San Francisco 49ers	L 7–51	3–12	Candlestick Park	56,670
16	December 16	Green Bay Packers	L 14–38	3–13	Hubert H. Humphrey Metrodome	51,197

=== Game summaries ===
==== Week 3: vs Atlanta Falcons ====
Week 3: Atlanta Falcons at Minnesota Vikings – Game summary

Quarter	1	2	3	4	Total
Falcons	3	3	7	7	20
Vikings	3	3	21	0	27

at Hubert H. Humphrey Metrodome, Minneapolis, Minnesota

- Date: September 16
- Game time: 1:00 p.m. EST
- Game weather: None (indoor stadium)
- Game attendance: 53,955
- Referee: Fred Wyant
- Recap, Game Book

Game information

First quarter

- ATL – Mick Luckhurst 33-yard field goal, 7:32. Falcons 3–0. Drive: 10 plays, 55 yards, 6:28.
- MIN – Jan Stenerud 22-yard field goal, 3:39. Tie 3–3. Drive: 10 plays, 68 yards, 4:53.

Second quarter

- MIN – Jan Stenerud 54-yard field goal, 14:29. Vikings 6–3. Drive: 3 plays, 0 yards, 0:22.
- ATL – Mick Luckhurst 43-yard field goal, 6:04. Tie 6–6. Drive: 6 plays, 21 yards, 2:49.

Third quarter

- MIN – Leo Lewis 42-yard pass from Tommy Kramer (Jan Stenerud kick), 12:10. Vikings 13–6. Drive: 6 plays, 59 yards, 2:50.
- ATL – Stacey Bailey 57-yard pass from Steve Bartkowski (Mick Luckhurst kick), 9:58. Tie 13–13. Drive: 4 plays, 73 yards, 2:12.
- MIN – Steve Jordan 21-yard pass from Tommy Kramer (Jan Stenerud kick), 5:50. Vikings 20–13. Drive: 9 plays, 80 yards, 4:08.
- MIN – Dwight Collins 43-yard pass from Tommy Kramer (Jan Stenerud kick), 1:59. Vikings 27–13. Drive: 8 plays, 87 yards, 3:33.

Fourth quarter

- ATL – Billy Johnson 32-yard pass from Steve Bartkowski (Mick Luckhurst kick), 5:43. Vikings 27–20. Drive: 7 plays, 64 yards, 3:19.

Top passers

- ATL – Steve Bartkowski – 14/24, 195 yards, 2 TD, INT
- MIN – Tommy Kramer – 15/30, 203 yards, 2 TD

Top rushers

- ATL – Gerald Riggs – 17 rushes, 83 yards
- MIN – Darrin Nelson – 15 rushes, 96 yards

Top receivers

- ATL – Stacey Bailey – 4 receptions, 102 yards, TD
- MIN – Leo Lewis – 3 receptions, 69 yards, TD

==== Week 15: at San Francisco 49ers ====
Week 15: Minnesota Vikings at San Francisco 49ers – Game summary

Quarter	1	2	3	4	Total
Vikings	0	7	0	0	7
49ers	14	17	6	14	51

at Candlestick Park, San Francisco, California

- Date: December 8, 1984
- Game time: 3:00 p.m. CST
- Game weather: Scattered clouds, 60 °F (16 °C)
- Game attendance: 56,670
- Referee: Gordon McCarter
- TV announcers (CBS): Frank Glieber (play-by-play) and Dick Vermeil (color)
- Recap, Game Book

Game information

First quarter

- SF – Dwight Clark 44-yard pass from Joe Montana (Ray Wersching kick), 6:44. 49ers 7–0. Drive: 1 play, 44 yards, 0:06.
- SF – Freddie Solomon 3-yard pass from Joe Montana (Ray Wersching kick), 1:41. 49ers 14–0. Drive: 11 plays, 67 yards, 4:26.

Second quarter

- MIN – Darrin Nelson 5-yard run (Jan Stenerud kick), 13:16. 49ers 14–7. Drive: 9 plays, 79 yards, 3:25.
- SF – Wendell Tyler 5-yard run (Ray Wersching kick), 9:12. 49ers 21–7. Drive: 9 plays, 63 yards, 4:04.
- SF – Renaldo Nehemiah 59-yard pass from Joe Montana (Ray Wersching kick), 6:54. 49ers 28–7. Drive: 5 plays, 84 yards, 1:10.
- SF – Ray Wersching 41-yard field goal, 0:03. 49ers 31–7. Drive: 7 plays, 46 yards, 1:01.

Third quarter

- SF – Ray Wersching 25-yard field goal, 9:48. 49ers 34–7. Drive: 10 plays, 40 yards, 5:12.
- SF – Ray Wersching 38-yard field goal, 0:44. 49ers 37–7. Drive: 10 plays, 31 yards, 4:30.

Fourth quarter

- SF – Derrick Harmon 3-yard run (Ray Wersching kick), 10:08. 49ers 44–7. Drive: 8 plays, 72 yards, 3:29.
- SF – Bill Ring 15-yard run (Ray Wersching kick), 3:02. 49ers 51–7. Drive: 12 plays, 70 yards, 5:29.

Top passers

- MIN – Wade Wilson – 18/32, 212 yards, INT
- SF – Joe Montana – 15/21, 246 yards, 3 TD

Top rushers

- MIN – Darrin Nelson – 7 rushes, 38 yards, TD
- SF – Derrick Harmon – 11 rushes, 56 yards, TD

Top receivers

- MIN – Leo Lewis – 3 receptions, 55 yards
- SF – Renaldo Nehemiah – 6 receptions, 125 yards, TD

=== Standings ===
NFC Central
	W	L	T	PCT	DIV	CONF	PF	PA	STK
Chicago Bears^{(3)}	10	6	0	.625	7–1	8–4	325	248	W1
Green Bay Packers	8	8	0	.500	5–3	8–4	390	309	W3
Tampa Bay Buccaneers	6	10	0	.375	3–5	5–9	335	380	W2
Detroit Lions	4	11	1	.281	3–5	4–7–1	283	408	L3
Minnesota Vikings	3	13	0	.188	2–6	3–9	276	484	L6

== Staff ==
1984 Minnesota Vikings staff
Front office: President – Max Winter; General manager – Mike Lynn; Head coaches: Head coach – Les Steckel; Offensive coaches: Offensive coordinator – Jerry Burns; Offensive backfield – John Michels; Receivers – Bob Leahy; Offensive line – Dan Radakovich; Special assistant – Dick Rehbein; Quality control – Bus Mertes	Defensive coaches: Defensive coordinator/inside linebackers – Floyd Reese; Defensive line – Tom Batta; Defensive backfield – Ross Fichtner; Quality control – Bob Hollway; Special teams coaches: Special teams/outside linebackers coach – Mike Sweatman; Strength and conditioning: Strength and conditioning – Bud Bjornaraa; Strength and conditioning – Dean Brittenham

== Roster ==
1984 Minnesota Vikings roster
Quarterbacks (QB): 9 Tommy Kramer; 4 Archie Manning; 11 Wade Wilson; Running backs (RB): 46 Alfred Anderson; 23 Ted Brown; 20 Darrin Nelson; 36 Allen Rice; 24 Maurice Turner; Wide receivers (WR): 84 Dwight Collins; 89 Mike Jones; 87 Leo Lewis; 85 Sammy White; Tight ends (TE): 88 Don Hasselbeck; 83 Steve Jordan; 86 Mike Mularkey; 81 Joe Senser	Offensive linemen (OL): 64 Grant Feasel C; 61 Wes Hamilton G; 60 Matt Hernandez T; 76 Tim Irwin T; 78 Steve Riley T; 68 Curtis Rouse G; 67 Ron Sams C; 66 Terry Tausch G; Defensive linemen (DL): 69 Hasson Arbubakrr DE; 73 Neil Elshire DE; 90 John Haines NT; 65 Charlie Johnson NT; 79 Doug Martin DE; 91 Greg Smith DE	Linebackers (LB): 58 Walker Lee Ashley ILB; 59 Matt Blair OLB; 50 Dennis Fowlkes ILB; 52 Dennis Johnson ILB; 94 Chris Martin OLB; 54 Fred McNeill OLB; 57 Robin Sendlein OLB; 55 Scott Studwell ILB; Defensive backs (DB): 21 Rufus Bess CB; 47 Joey Browner CB/FS; 43 Jeff Colter CB; 25 Marcellus Greene CB; 45 Tommy Hannon SS; 39 Carl Lee FS; 29 John Swain CB; 37 Willie Teal CB; 34 Dan Wagoner SS; Special teams (ST): 8 Greg Coleman P; 3 Jan Stenerud K	Reserve: -- Melvin Brown CB (IR); -- Melvin Brown WR (IR); 82 Bob Bruer TE (IR); 63 Robert Cobb NT (Left squad); 51 Jim Hough C (IR); -- Keith Kidd WR (IR); 77 Mark Mullaney DE (IR); 49 Keith Nord S (PUP); -- James Spencer LB (IR); Rookies in italics Source

== Statistics ==
=== Team leaders ===
Category	Player(s)	Value
Passing yards	Tommy Kramer	1,678
Passing touchdowns	Tommy Kramer	9
Rushing yards	Alfred Anderson	773
Rushing touchdowns	Ted Brown; Darrin Nelson	3
Receiving yards	Leo Lewis	830
Receiving touchdowns	Leo Lewis	4
Points	Jan Stenerud	90
Kickoff return yards	Darrin Nelson	891
Punt return yards	Darrin Nelson	180
Tackles	Carl Lee	100
Sacks	Randy Holloway	5
Interceptions	Rufus Bess	3

=== League rankings ===
Category	Total yards	Yards per game	NFL rank (out of 28)
Passing offense	2,872	179.5	22nd
Rushing offense	1,844	115.2	18th
Total offense	4,716	294.8	25th
Passing defense	3,779	236.2	26th
Rushing defense	2,573	160.8	27th
Total defense	6,352	397.0	28th
