= 1984 Cotton Bowl Classic =

- 48th Cotton Bowl Classic
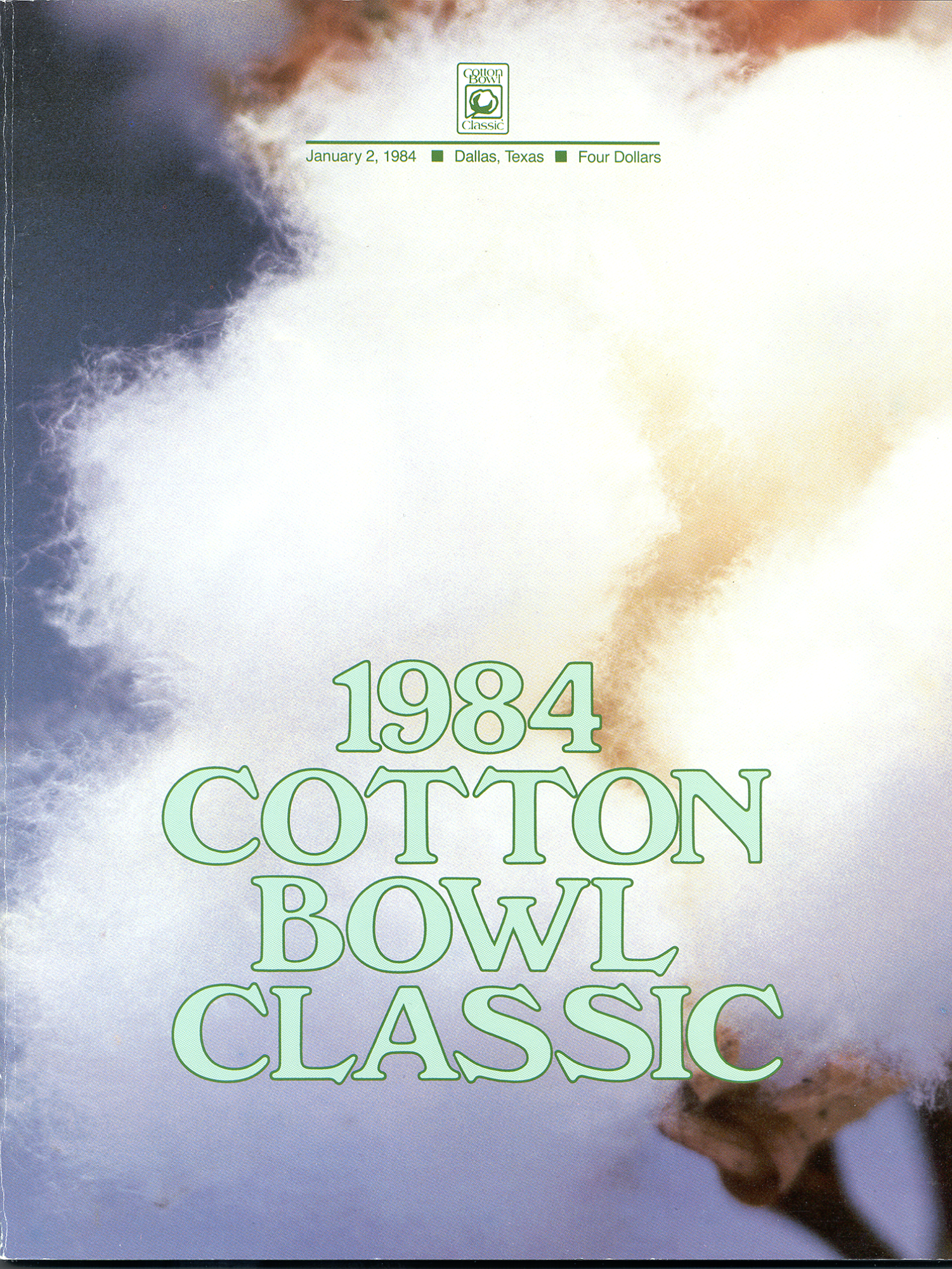
Georgia Bulldogs	Texas Longhorns
(9–1–1)	(11–0)
SEC	SWC
10	9
Head coach: Vince Dooley	Head coach: Fred Akers
AP / Coaches; 7 / 7	AP / Coaches; 2 / 2
	1	2	3	4	Total
Georgia	3	0	0	7	10
Texas	3	0	6	0	9
- Date: January 2, 1984
- Season: 1983
- Stadium: Cotton Bowl
- Location: Dallas, Texas
- MVP: John Lastinger (Georgia QB); Jeff Leiding (Texas LB)
- Favorite: Texas by 7½ points
- Referee: Howard Roe (Big Eight)
- Attendance: 67,891

United States TV coverage
- Network: CBS
- Announcers: Lindsey Nelson, Pat Haden

The Cotton Bowl in Dallas, Texas, hosted the Cotton Bowl Classic.

The 1984 Cotton Bowl Classic was the 48th edition of the college football bowl game, played at the Cotton Bowl in Dallas, Texas, on Monday, January 2. Part of the 1983–84 bowl game season, it matched the undefeated and second-ranked Texas Longhorns of the Southwest Conference (SWC) and the #7 Georgia Bulldogs of the Southeastern Conference (SEC). Underdog Georgia rallied with a late touchdown to win, 10–9.

New Year's Day was on Sunday in 1984, and the major college bowl games were played the following day.

== Teams ==
=== Georgia ===
The Bulldogs tied Clemson on the road in September, and lost at home to Auburn in November. That win also gave Auburn the SEC championship and an automatic berth to the Sugar Bowl . It was Georgia's third appearance in the Cotton Bowl.

=== Texas ===
The Longhorns had won all eleven games and had a regular season winning streak of seventeen games.

== Game summary ==
Televised by CBS, the game kicked off shortly after 12:30 p.m. CST, as did the Fiesta Bowl on NBC.

Texas drove deep on its first possession, but settled for a 22-yard field goal by Jeff Ward. Georgia's Kevin Butler made one from 43 yards to tie the game in the closing seconds of the first quarter. The second quarter was scoreless.

Ward added six more points with two more field goals of 40 and 27 yards in the third quarter, and Texas led 9–3 with less than five minutes to play. A Chip Andrews (Georgia) muffed punt by Texas defensive back Craig Curry, recovered by Defensive Back Gary Moss (Georgia), late in the fourth quarter allowed Georgia quarterback John Lastinger to run 17 yards for a touchdown with 3:22 left to play to capture a 10–9 victory. The loss was the first for the Longhorns, costing them a possible national title.

=== Scoring ===
First quarter

- Texas - Jeff Ward 22-yard field goal
- Georgia - Kevin Butler 43-yard field goal

Second quarter

No scoring

Third quarter

- Texas - Ward 40-yard field goal
- Texas - Ward 27-yard field goal

Fourth quarter

- Georgia - John Lastinger 17-yard run (Butler kick)

== Statistics ==
Statistics	Georgia	Texas
First downs	13	14
Yards Rushing	45–149	47–110
Yards Passing	66	168
Passing	6–20–1	8–26–2
Total Offense	65–215	73–278
Punts–Average	9–41	7–46
Fumbles–Lost	2–1	4–2
Turnovers	2	4
Penalties–Yards	3–25	6–52
Time of possession	29:41	30:19

== Aftermath ==
That night in the Orange Bowl, the #5 Miami Hurricanes upset top-ranked Nebraska, 31–30. Miami moved past Nebraska and the Longhorns to secure their first national championship. Georgia climbed to fourth in the final AP poll, and Texas fell to fifth.
