= Jitter Fields =

American football player (born 1962)

No. 26, 25, 29, 40
- Positions: Defensive back, return specialist

Personal information
- Born: August 16, 1962 (age 64); Dallas, Texas, U.S.
- Listed height: 5 ft 8 in (1.73 m)
- Listed weight: 185 lb (84 kg)

Career information
- High school: H. Grady Spruce (Dallas)
- College: Texas
- NFL draft: 1984: 5th round, 123rd overall pick

Career history
- New Orleans Saints (1984–1985); Saskatchewan Roughriders (1985); Indianapolis Colts (1987); Kansas City Chiefs (1987–1988); Oklahoma City Twisters (1991–1992); Detroit Drive (1991); Dallas Texans (1992)
- Stats at Pro Football Reference

Alfred Gene "Jitter" Fields, Jr. (born August 16, 1962) is an American former professional football defensive back and return specialist who played in the National Football League (NFL), Canadian Football League (CFL) and Arena Football League (AFL). He played college football for the Texas Longhorns.

== Early life ==
Fields was born and raised in Dallas, Texas, and played high school football at H. Grady Spruce High School there.

== College career ==
Fields played college football for Texas where he lettered for four years despite being a walk-on. In 1982, he led the team in pass breakups and in 1983 he stood out as a punt returner. In 1982 he obtained national notoriety when, in a game against SMU, a badly thrown pass for Bobby Leach bounced off Fields' shoulder pads and into Leach's hands for a touchdown to take the lead on a 4th quarter play where Fields was filling in for an injured Fred Acorn.

In his senior year, he helped the Longhorns win the Southwest Conference Championship and go undefeated through the regular season with a #2 ranking. They went into the Cotton Bowl needing a win over Georgia and a loss by Nebraska in the Orange Bowl to win the National Championship. They got the loss by Nebraska, but came up short against Georgia, losing 10–9. The game turned with 5 minutes left on a muffed punt by Fields' team mate Craig Curry which Fields had a chance to recover, but it slipped through his hands setting up the game winning touchdown for Georgia. He finished the game with the record for most punt returns (5) in a Cotton Bowl.

== Professional career ==
=== New Orleans ===
He was selected by the New Orleans Saints in the fifth round of the 1984 NFL draft. He played for them in 1984, appearing in 13 games and returning 27 punts and 13 kick offs. He had a punt return for 61 yards, which was the 6th longest one that season and the Saints team record at the time. He was cut by the Saints on August 20th at the end of the 1985 training camp.

=== Saskatchewan Roughriders ===
After being cut by the Saints, he was signed to a 21-day trial on September 12th, 1985 by the Saskatchewan Roughriders. He made his debut on September 28th and on his first kickoff return took the ball 59 yards for the team's 2nd longest kickoff return of the season. Over 5 games he played primarily on defense, but also had 15 kickoff returns for 423 yards (including another 59 yarder on 10/20) and 11 punt returns for 104 yards; including a 38 yard punt return that was the Roughriders longest of the season. Despite only playing in 5 games over the 16 game season - and having no kickoff returns in his last game, he managed to finish in 7th for Kickoff Return yardage in the CFL that season.

=== Ottawa Rough Riders ===
He started the 1986 season with Saskatchewan, but in June was traded to Ottawa for future considerations. He was signed to Ottawa's practice squad.

=== Indianapolis Colts ===
He was signed by the Indianapolis Colts in September of the 1987 season to play as a replacement player during the 1987 NFL player's strike. He played one game with the Colts, was cut and quickly signed by the Kansas City Chiefs. During his first game with the Chiefs, during the last weekend of the strike, he had a career-high 85-yard punt return for a TD which was the 3rd longest punt return in the NFL that year. In the same game he tied the Chiefs record for most punt return yards in a game with 123 yards. He played in one game after the end of the strike and was released. But the Chiefs resigned him in December and during the final 3 games of the season he returned 6 punts. He was cut at the end of training camp in 1988.

=== Oklahoma City Twisters ===
Fields then spent two years playing semi-pro football in the Minor Football League (MFL) where he was also a defensive coordinator for the Oklahoma City Twisters.

=== Dallas Texans ===
In 1991 and 1992 he played in the Arena Football League. In 1991 he helped the Detroit Drive to get to ArenaBowl V and the next year he helped the Dallas Texans win the Western Division Championship.

== Later life ==
Fields went into coaching and education after ending his pro football career.

In 1991–92, he was the defensive coordinator of the Oklahoma City Twisters in the Minor Professional Football League.

From 1992 to 2012, he taught school in Detroit and coached Track and Field .

He was the head coach of the Michigan Coyotes in the Stars Football League in 2012. The team went 0–2 and folded after the season.

He was then defensive backfield coach and special teams coordinator and an education professor at Kentucky Christian University for 2013–2014, before returning to Detroit as a youth football coach and educator. In 2016, he earned a master's degree in coaching education from Ohio University.

He went into real estate and continued to coach track, this time at the University Liggett School.

He currently teaches at Michigan Islamic Institute as a Social Studies teacher.
