= Rickey Hagood =

American football player (1961–1994)

No. 72
- Position: Defensive tackle

Personal information
- Born: April 24, 1961 (age 65); Easley, South Carolina, U.S.
- Listed height: 6 ft 2 in (1.88 m)
- Listed weight: 286 lb (130 kg)

Career information
- High school: Wren (Piedmont, South Carolina)
- College: South Carolina
- NFL draft: 1984: 4th round, 86th overall pick

Career history
- Seattle Seahawks (1984)*; San Diego Chargers (1984); Los Angeles Raiders (1985)*; Houston Oilers (1987)*
- * Offseason or practice squad member only
- Stats at Pro Football Reference

Rickey Hagood (born April 24, 1961) is an American former professional football player who was a defensive tackle for the San Diego Chargers of the National Football League (NFL). He played college football for the South Carolina Gamecocks and was selected by the Seattle Seahawks in the fourth round of the 1984 NFL draft with the 86th overall pick. He played for the Chargers in 1984.
