= 1984 Fiesta Bowl =

- 13th Fiesta Bowl
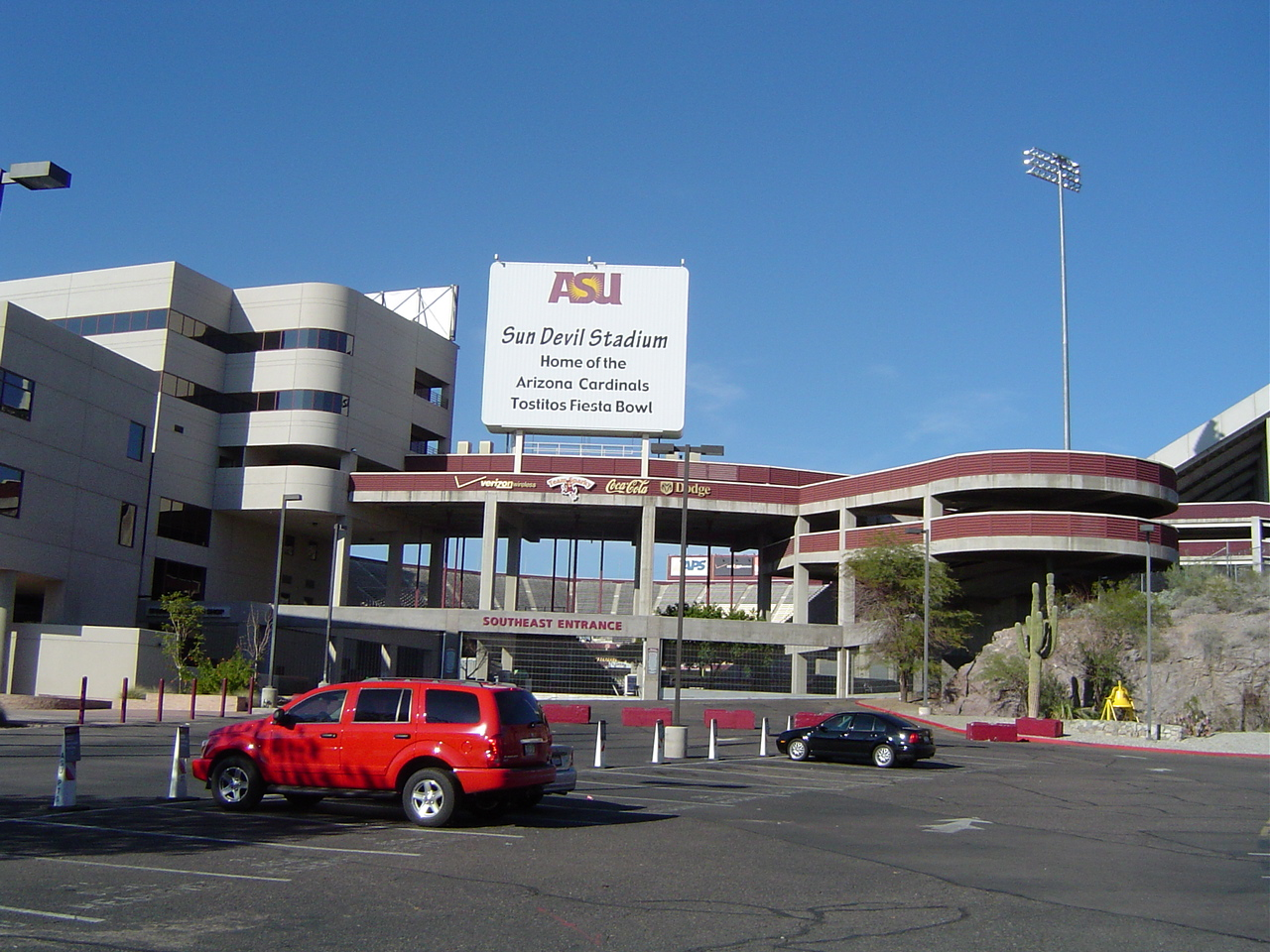
- Sun Devil Stadium in Tempe, Arizona, hosted the Fiesta Bowl.
Ohio State Buckeyes	Pittsburgh Panthers
(8–3)	(8–2–1)
Big Ten	Independent
28	23
Head coach: Earle Bruce	Head coach: Foge Fazio
AP / Coaches; 14 / 13	AP / Coaches; 15 / 13
	1	2	3	4	Total
Ohio State	7	7	0	14	28
Pittsburgh	0	7	0	16	23
- Date: January 2, 1984
- Season: 1983
- Stadium: Sun Devil Stadium
- Location: Tempe, Arizona
- MVP: John Congemi (Pitt QB); Rowland Tatum (OSU LB)
- Favorite: Ohio State by 2½ points
- Referee: Gene Wurtz (WAC)
- Attendance: 66,484

United States TV coverage
- Network: NBC
- Announcers: Charlie Jones, Bob Griese
- Nielsen ratings: 7.9

The 1984 Fiesta Bowl was the thirteenth edition of the college football bowl game, played at Sun Devil Stadium in Tempe, Arizona on Monday, January 2. Part of the 1983–84 bowl game season, it matched the fourteenth-ranked Ohio State Buckeyes of the Big Ten Conference, and the #15 Pittsburgh Panthers, an independent. Slightly favored, Ohio State rallied late in the fourth quarter to win 28–23.

New Year's Day was on Sunday in 1984, and the college bowl games were played the following day.

== Teams ==
=== Ohio State ===
The Buckeyes were ranked third until a loss at Iowa in late September; they later lost on the road to Illinois and rival Michigan. This was their second Fiesta Bowl appearance.

=== Pittsburgh ===
The Panthers opened with two wins, but lost two road games at Maryland and West Virginia. They won six straight, then tied rival Penn State. This was Pittsburgh's third Fiesta Bowl appearance.

== Game summary ==
The first game of a tripleheader (Rose, Orange) on NBC, the Fiesta kicked off shortly after 11:30 a.m. MST, as did the Cotton Bowl on CBS.

Ohio State scored first when quarterback Mike Tomczak scored on a three-yard quarterback keeper. Pittsburgh tied the score at seven on a 6-yard pass from John Congemi to wide receiver Clint Wilson. Running back Keith Byars scored on an 11-yard run before halftime, to give Ohio State a 14–7 halftime lead.

After a scoreless third quarter, the action increased in the fourth. Pitt wide receiver Clint Wilson recovered a fumble in the end zone for a touchdown to tie the game at 14. Byars took the kickoff 99 yards for a touchdown, and Ohio State reclaimed the lead at 21–14. Congemi then found Dwight Collins for a touchdown, but the two-point conversion attempt failed, and Ohio State held on to a one-point lead. A 37-yard field goal from Tom Everett with 2:39 left, gave Pittsburgh a 23–21 lead. Tomczak threw a 39-yard touchdown strike to Thad Jemison for the game-winning touchdown, with 39 seconds left, and Ohio State escaped with a 28–23 win.

=== Scoring ===
First quarter

- Ohio State – Mike Tomczak 3-yard run (Rich Spangler kick)

Second quarter

- Pittsburgh – Clint Wilson 6-yard pass from John Congemi (Snuffy Everett kick)
- Ohio State – Keith Byars 11-yard run (Spangler kick)

Third quarter

No scoring

Fourth quarter

- Pittsburgh – Wilson fumble recovery in end zone (Everett kick)
- Ohio State – Byars 99-yard kickoff return (Spangler kick)
- Pittsburgh – Dwight Collins 11-yard pass from Congemi (pass failed)
- Pittsburgh – Everett 37-yard field goal
- Ohio State – Thad Jemison 39-yard pass from Tomczak (Spangler kick)

== Statistics ==
Statistics	Ohio State	Pittsburgh
First downs	21	27
Yards rushing	46–184	37–146
Yards passing	226	341
Passing	15–32–1	31–46–2
Return yards	17	72
Total Offense	78–410	83–487
Punts–Average	4–37.3	3–39.0
Fumbles–Lost	3–1	2–1
Turnovers	2	3
Penalties–Yards	8–70	8–60
Time of Possession	29:13	30:47

== Aftermath ==
Ohio State climbed to ninth in the final AP poll, and Pittsburgh fell to eighteenth.
