= Darrell Nelson =

American football player (born 1961)

No. 81
- Position: Tight end

Personal information
- Born: October 27, 1961 (age 65); Memphis, Tennessee, U.S.
- Listed height: 6 ft 2 in (1.88 m)
- Listed weight: 235 lb (107 kg)

Career information
- High school: Mitchell (Memphis)
- College: Memphis
- NFL draft: 1984: undrafted

Career history
- Pittsburgh Steelers (1984–1985)

Career NFL statistics
- Receptions: 2
- Receiving yards: 31
- Stats at Pro Football Reference

Darrell Maurice Nelson (born October 27, 1961) is an American former professional football player who was a tight end in the National Football League (NFL) for the Pittsburgh Steelers. He played college football for the Memphis Tigers.
