= Leo Lewis (wide receiver) =

American football player (born 1956)

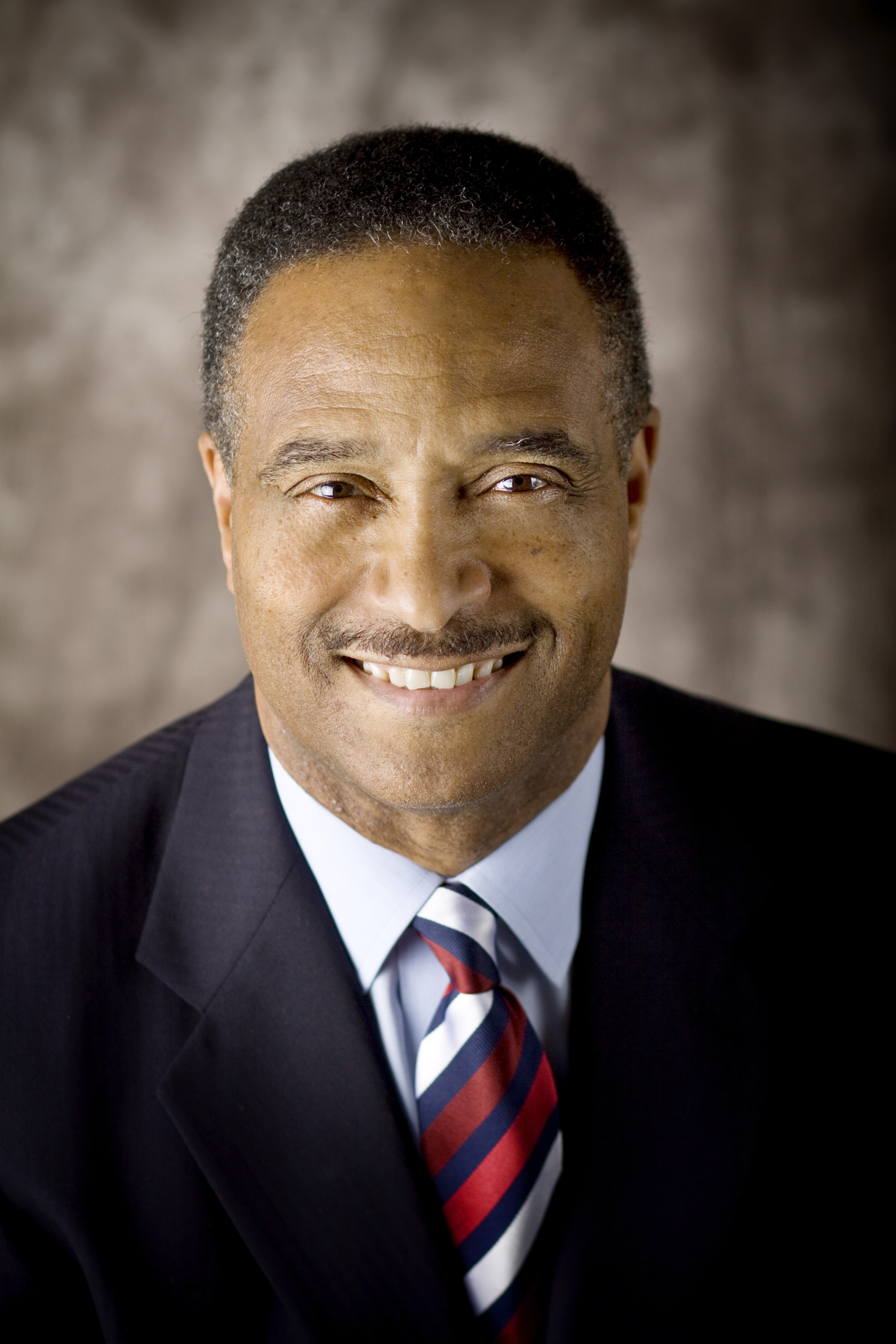

No. 33, 87, 83
- Position: Wide receiver

Personal information
- Born: September 17, 1956 (age 70); Columbia, Missouri, U.S.
- Listed height: 5 ft 8 in (1.73 m)
- Listed weight: 195 lb (88 kg)

Career information
- High school: Hickman (Columbia)
- College: Missouri
- NFL draft: 1979: undrafted

Career history
- St. Louis Cardinals (1979)*; Calgary Stampeders (1980); Hamilton Tiger-Cats (1980); Minnesota Vikings (1981–1989); Cleveland Browns (1990); Minnesota Vikings (1990-1991)
- * Offseason or practice squad member only

Awards and highlights
- Second-team All-Big Eight (1976)

Career NFL statistics
- Receptions: 182
- Receiving yards: 2,924
- Receiving touchdowns: 16
- Stats at Pro Football Reference

Leo Everett Lewis III (born September 17, 1956) is an American former professional football player who was a wide receiver for 11 seasons with the Minnesota Vikings and Cleveland Browns of the National Football League (NFL). He played college football for the Missouri Tigers.

Lewis is the son of College Football Hall of Fame and Canadian Football Hall of Fame running back Leo Lewis Jr. After retiring from active play, Lewis held the position of director of player development for the Vikings from 1992 to 2005. At the same time, Lewis wrote, edited and published the Vikings' player and alumni newsletter.

In 2023, he was named King Boreas for the Saint Paul Winter Carnival.

Leo Lewis graduated from David H. Hickman High School in Columbia, Missouri and stayed locally to attend college at the University of Missouri. Dr. Lewis worked for the University of Minnesota as the associate athletics director for student-athlete development from 2005 to 2014.

== NFL career statistics ==
Legend
| **Bold** | Career high |

=== Regular season ===
| Year | Team | Games | | Receiving | | | | |
| Year | Team | GP | GS | Rec | Yds | Avg | Lng | TD |
|---|---|---|---|---|---|---|---|---|
| 1981 | MIN | 4 | 1 | 2 | 58 | **29.0** | 52 | 0 |
| 1982 | MIN | 9 | 0 | 8 | 150 | 18.8 | 39 | 3 |
| 1983 | MIN | 14 | 4 | 12 | 127 | 10.6 | 18 | 0 |
| 1984 | MIN | **16** | 5 | **47** | **830** | 17.7 | 56 | **4** |
| 1985 | MIN | 10 | 10 | 29 | 442 | 15.2 | 43 | 3 |
| 1986 | MIN | **16** | **16** | 32 | 600 | 18.8 | **76** | 2 |
| 1987 | MIN | 12 | 12 | 24 | 383 | 16.0 | 36 | 2 |
| 1988 | MIN | **16** | 1 | 11 | 141 | 12.8 | 46 | 1 |
| 1989 | MIN | **16** | 0 | 12 | 148 | 12.3 | 28 | 1 |
| 1990 | CLE | 3 | 0 | 0 | 0 | 0.0 | 0 | 0 |
| 1990 | MIN | 11 | 0 | 1 | 9 | 9.0 | 9 | 0 |
| 1991 | MIN | **16** | 0 | 4 | 36 | 9.0 | 11 | 0 |
| | | 143 | 49 | 182 | 2,924 | 16.1 | 76 | 16 |

=== Playoffs ===
| Year | Team | Games | | Receiving | | | | |
| Year | Team | GP | GS | Rec | Yds | Avg | Lng | TD |
|---|---|---|---|---|---|---|---|---|
| 1982 | MIN | 2 | 0 | 0 | 0 | 0.0 | 0 | 0 |
| 1987 | MIN | **3** | **3** | **7** | **86** | 12.3 | **23** | **1** |
| 1988 | MIN | 2 | 0 | 1 | 19 | **19.0** | 19 | 0 |
| 1989 | MIN | 1 | 0 | 2 | 19 | 9.5 | 15 | 0 |
| | | 8 | 3 | 10 | 124 | 12.4 | 23 | 1 |
