= Paul Sverchek =

American football player (born 1961)

No. 60
- Position: Defensive tackle

Personal information
- Born: May 9, 1961 (age 65); San Luis Obispo, California, U.S.
- Listed height: 6 ft 3 in (1.91 m)
- Listed weight: 252 lb (114 kg)

Career information
- High school: San Luis Obispo
- College: Cal Poly
- NFL draft: 1984: 8th round, 208th overall pick

Career history
- Minnesota Vikings (1984); Washington Redskins (1985)*
- * Offseason or practice squad member only
- Stats at Pro Football Reference

Paul Sverchek (born May 9, 1961) is an American former professional football defensive tackle. He played for the Minnesota Vikings in 1984.

== Early life ==
After graduating from San Luis Obispo High School, Sverchek became a three-year starter for Cal Poly. He recorded eight sacks and 47 tackles in 1981, prior to adding 38 tackles along with four sacks in 1982, and then 3.5 more sacks in 1983.

== Professional career ==
Sverchek was selected in the eighth round with the 208th overall pick by the Minnesota Vikings in the 1984 NFL draft.

NFL statistics
Season	Team	GP
1984 / Career	MIN	3
