= 1983 Rice Owls football team =

American college football season

1983 Rice Owls football
- Conference: Southwest Conference
- Record: 1–10 (0–8 SWC)
- Head coach: Ray Alborn (6th season)
- Home stadium: Rice Stadium

1983 Southwest Conference football standings
	Conf.					Overall
Team	W		L		T	W		L		T
No. 5 Texas $	8	–	0	–	0	11	–	1	–	0
No. 12 SMU	7	–	1	–	0	10	–	2	–	0
Baylor	4	–	3	–	1	7	–	4	–	1
Texas A&M	4	–	3	–	1	5	–	5	–	1
Arkansas	4	–	4	–	0	6	–	5	–	0
Texas Tech	3	–	4	–	1	3	–	7	–	1
Houston	3	–	5	–	0	4	–	7	–	0
TCU	1	–	6	–	1	1	–	8	–	2
Rice	0	–	8	–	0	1	–	10	–	0
$ – Conference champion; Rankings from AP Poll

The 1983 Rice Owls football team was an American football team that represented Rice University in the Southwest Conference during the 1983 NCAA Division I-A football season. In their sixth year under head coach Ray Alborn, the team compiled a 1–10 record.

== Schedule ==
Date	Opponent	Site	Result	Attendance	Source
September 1	Houston	Rice Stadium; Houston, TX (rivalry)	L 14–45	30,000	
September 10	Minnesota*	Rice Stadium; Houston, TX	L 17–21	10,000	
September 17	LSU*	Rice Stadium; Houston, TX	L 10–24	34,000	
September 24	Southwestern Louisiana*	Rice Stadium; Houston, TX	W 22–21	10,000	
October 1	at No. 2 Texas	Texas Memorial Stadium; Austin, TX (rivalry)	L 6–42	70,005	
October 8	TCU	Rice Stadium; Houston, TX	L 3–34	10,000	
October 15	at Texas Tech	Jones Stadium; Lubbock, TX	L 3–14	43,611	
October 22	Texas A&M	Rice Stadium; Houston, TX	L 10–29	40,000	
October 29	at Arkansas	War Memorial Stadium; Little Rock, AR	L 0–35	52,986	
November 5	at No. 8 SMU	Texas Stadium; Irving, TX (rivalry)	L 6–20	28,750	
November 12	at Baylor	Baylor Stadium; Waco, TX	L 14–48	26,500	
*Non-conference game; Rankings from AP Poll released prior to the game
