= 1983 Astro-Bluebonnet Bowl =

- 25th Bluebonnet Bowl
Oklahoma State Cowboys	Baylor Bears
(7–4)	(7–3–1)
24	14
Head coach: Jimmy Johnson	Head coach: Grant Teaff
	AP / Coaches; 20 / 17
	1	2	3	4	Total
Oklahoma State	6	18	0	0	24
Baylor	0	7	0	7	14
- Date: December 31, 1983
- Season: 1983
- Stadium: Astrodome
- Location: Houston, Texas
- Referee: Joe Hicks (SEC)

United States TV coverage
- Network: Mizlou
- Announcers: Merle Harmon and Paul Maguire

The 1983 Astro-Bluebonnet Bowl was a college football postseason bowl game that featured the Baylor Bears and the Oklahoma State Cowboys.

== Background ==
Oklahoma State finished 4th in the Big Eight Conference in their second bowl appearance in three seasons. Baylor finished tied for 3rd in the Southwest Conference in their first bowl game since 1981.

== Game summary ==
For Baylor, Gerald McNeil caught 10 passes for 163 yards with 2 touchdowns. Oklahoma State quarterback Rusty Hilger went 12-of-17 for 137 yards and two touchdowns before being knocked out by Robert Watters, missing the 2nd half.

=== Scoring summary ===
- Oklahoma State – Lewis 12 pass from Rusty Hilger (kick blocked), 8:45 remaining in 1st
- Oklahoma State – Anderson 1 run (Lewis pass from Hilger), 14:58 remaining in 2nd
- Oklahoma State – Harris 26 pass from Rusty Hilger (Roach kick), 6:02 remaining in 2nd
- Baylor – Gerald McNeil 12 pass from Cody Carlson (Jimmerson kick), 1:21 remaining in 2nd
- Oklahoma State – Larry Roach 44 yard field goal, 0:16, remaining in 2nd
- Baylor – Gerald McNeil 28 pass from Alfred Anderson (Jimmerson kick), 5:07 remaining in 4th

== Aftermath ==
Johnson left for the Miami Hurricanes after the game ended. Baylor returned to the penultimate Bluebonnet Bowl in 1986. Both would become conference rivals starting in 1996 with advent of the Big XII.

== Statistics ==
Statistics	Baylor	Oklahoma State
First downs	18	19
Rushing yards	134	178
Passing yards	245	187
Passing (C–A–I)	16–32–2	17–30–1
Total offense	379	365
Punts–average	5–42.0	6–39.0
Fumbles–lost	1–1	1–1
Penalty–yards	7–55	4–40
3rd-down conversions	6-of-14	7-of-18
