= Leonard Williams (running back) =

American football player (born 1960)

No. 26
- Position: Running back

Personal information
- Born: June 27, 1960 (age 66); Man, West Virginia, U.S.
- Listed height: 6 ft 0 in (1.83 m)
- Listed weight: 205 lb (93 kg)

Career information
- High school: Eastern Guilford
- College: Western Carolina
- NFL draft: 1984: undrafted

Career history
- Kansas City Chiefs (1984)*; Memphis Showboats (1984-1985); Buffalo Bills (1987)
- * Offseason or practice squad member only
- Stats at Pro Football Reference

Leonard Williams Jr. (born June 27, 1960) is an American former professional football player who was a running back for the Buffalo Bills of the National Football League (NFL). He played college football for the Western Carolina Catamounts. He also played professionally in the United States Football League (USFL) for the Memphis Showboats.
