= Alfred Anderson (American football) =

American football player (born 1961)

No. 46
- Position: Running back

Personal information
- Born: August 4, 1961 (age 65); Waco, Texas, U.S.
- Listed height: 6 ft 1 in (1.85 m)
- Listed weight: 219 lb (99 kg)

Career information
- High school: Richfield (Waco)
- College: Baylor
- NFL draft: 1984: 3rd round, 67th overall pick

Career history
- Minnesota Vikings (1984–1991)

Awards and highlights
- PFWA All-Rookie Team (1984); Second-team All-American (1983); First-team All-SWC (1983)

Career NFL statistics
- Rushing yards: 2,374
- Average: 3.8
- Rushing touchdowns: 22
- Stats at Pro Football Reference

Alfred Anthony Anderson (born August 4, 1961) is an American former professional football player who was a running back for eight seasons in the National Football League (NFL).

Anderson was born and raised in Waco, Texas and played scholastically at Richfield High School. He played college football for the Baylor Bears, where, as a senior, he was honored by Football News as a second-team All-American.

Anderson was selected in the third round of the 1984 NFL draft by the Minnesota Vikings, and spent his entire career with them.

== College statistics ==
Year	Rushing			Receiving			Returns		
Year	Att	Yds	TD	Rec	Yds	TD	KR	Yds	TD
1980	64	293	9	2	23	0	0	0	0
1981	60	251	8	14	201	0	1	12	0
1982	201	837	8	17	206	1	0	0	0
1983	231	1046	10	9	113	0	0	0	0
Career	556	2427	35	42	543	1	1	12	0

== NFL career statistics ==
Year	Team	Games		Rushing					Receiving				
Year	Team	G	GS	Att	Yds	Avg	Lng	TD	Rec	Yds	Avg	Lng	TD
1984	MIN	16	14	201	773	3.8	23	2	17	102	6.0	28	1
1985	MIN	12	6	50	121	2.4	10	4	16	175	10.9	54	1
1986	MIN	16	8	83	347	4.2	29	2	17	179	10.5	37	2
1987	MIN	10	10	68	319	4.7	27	2	7	69	9.9	22	0
1988	MIN	16	13	87	300	3.4	18	7	23	242	10.5	19	1
1989	MIN	11	8	52	189	3.6	14	2	20	193	9.7	18	0
1990	MIN	11	6	59	207	3.5	14	2	13	80	6.2	17	0
1991	MIN	16	5	26	118	4.5	19	1	1	2	2.0	2	0
Career		108	70	626	2,374	3.8	29	22	114	1,042	9.1	54	5
