= Fred Acorn =

American football player (born 1961)

No. 27
- Position: Defensive back

Personal information
- Born: March 17, 1961 (age 65); Rotan, Texas, U.S.
- Listed height: 5 ft 10 in (1.78 m)
- Listed weight: 185 lb (84 kg)

Career information
- High school: Rotan
- College: Texas
- NFL draft: 1984: 3rd round, 57th overall pick

Career history
- Tampa Bay Buccaneers (1984)

Career NFL statistics
- Interceptions: 1
- Stats at Pro Football Reference

Fred Acorn (born March 17, 1961) is an American former professional football player who was a defensive back in the National Football League (NFL).

== College career ==
Acorn played football at Texas from 1982 to 1983 and ran track at The University of Texas in 1980. In 1982 he helped the Longhorns to a #17/#18 final ranking and a trip to the 1982 Sun Bowl. In 1983 he was named 2nd-team All-Southwest Conference as the Longhorns won the Southwest Conference Championship, spent most of the season ranked #2 and finished ranked #5 after losing the Cotton Bowl.

As a high school athlete at Rotan, Acorn set the Texas state high school record in the 200-meter which stood until 1989-90. He ran the 55 meters and 100 meters at Texas, and finished in 1st Place at the 1980 Border Olympics in the 100 meters and the City of Palms Invitational. At the 1980 Southwest Conference Championships, he ran the 3rd fastest 55 meters in school history.

== Professional career ==
He was selected in the third round by and played for the Tampa Bay Buccaneers in 1984. He played in 14 games, with 1 start and 1 interception. At the end of the 1985 training camp he was waived by the Buccaneers.

== Personal life ==
In 1987, he was arrested and charged with three counts of delivery of cocaine after allegedly selling a quarter-ounce of cocaine to an undercover agent.
