= Rufus Bess =

American football player (born 1956)

No. 38, 28, 21
- Position: Cornerback

Personal information
- Born: September 13, 1956 (age 70); Darlington, South Carolina, U.S.
- Listed height: 5 ft 9 in (1.75 m)
- Listed weight: 184 lb (83 kg)

Career information
- College: South Carolina State
- NFL draft: 1979: undrafted

Career history
- Oakland Raiders (1979–1980); Buffalo Bills (1981–1982); Minnesota Vikings (1983–1988); Chicago Bruisers (1988)

Career NFL statistics
- Sacks: 3.5
- Interceptions: 11
- Fumble recoveries: 10
- Stats at Pro Football Reference

Career AFL statistics
- Tackles: 18
- Interceptions: 1
- Pass breakups: 1
- Stats at ArenaFan.com

Rufus T. Bess Jr. (born September 13, 1956) is an American former professional football player who was a cornerback in the National Football League (NFL) for the Oakland Raiders, Buffalo Bills, and Minnesota Vikings. He played college football for the South Carolina State Bulldogs.

He worked at North Community High School in Minneapolis, Minnesota as a football coach, staff member and teacher.

He now works at Robbinsdale Armstrong High School in Plymouth, Minnesota.
