= 1983 Baylor Bears football team =

American college football season

1983 Baylor Bears football

Astro-Bluebonnet Bowl, L 14–24 vs. Oklahoma State
- Conference: Southwest Conference
- Record: 7–4–1 (4–3–1 SWC)
- Head coach: Grant Teaff (12th season)
- Offensive coordinator: Duke Christian (5th season)
- Offensive scheme: I formation
- Defensive coordinator: Pete Fredenburg (1st season)
- Base defense: 4–4
- Home stadium: Baylor Stadium

1983 Southwest Conference football standings
	Conf.					Overall
Team	W		L		T	W		L		T
No. 5 Texas $	8	–	0	–	0	11	–	1	–	0
No. 12 SMU	7	–	1	–	0	10	–	2	–	0
Baylor	4	–	3	–	1	7	–	4	–	1
Texas A&M	4	–	3	–	1	5	–	5	–	1
Arkansas	4	–	4	–	0	6	–	5	–	0
Texas Tech	3	–	4	–	1	3	–	7	–	1
Houston	3	–	5	–	0	4	–	7	–	0
TCU	1	–	6	–	1	1	–	8	–	2
Rice	0	–	8	–	0	1	–	10	–	0
$ – Conference champion; Rankings from AP Poll

The 1983 Baylor Bears football team represented Baylor University as a member of the Southwest Conference (SWC) during the 1983 NCAA Division I-A football season. Led by 12th-year head coach Grant Teaff, the Bears compiled an overall record of 7–4–1 with a mark of 4–3–1 in conference play, tying for third place the SWC. Baylor was invited to the Astro-Bluebonnet Bowl, where the Bears lost to Oklahoma State. The team played home games at Baylor Stadium in Waco, Texas.

== Schedule ==
Date	Opponent	Rank	Site	TV	Result	Attendance	Source
September 10	BYU*		Baylor Stadium; Waco, TX		W 40–36	32,500	
September 17	at UTEP*		Sun Bowl; El Paso, TX		W 20–6	25,709	
September 24	Texas Tech		Baylor Stadium; Waco, TX (rivalry)	ABC	L 11–26	38,000	
October 1	at Houston		Houston Astrodome; Houston, TX (rivalry)		W 42–21	26,640	
October 8	at No. 13 SMU		Texas Stadium; Irving, TX		L 26–42	45,025	
October 15	Texas A&M		Baylor Stadium; Waco, TX (Battle of the Brazos)	WTBS	T 13–13	40,000	
October 22	TCU^{†}		Baylor Stadium; Waco, TX (rivalry)		W 56–21	35,876	
October 29	Tulane*		Baylor Stadium; Waco, TX		W 24–18	20,050	
November 5	at Arkansas		Razorback Stadium; Fayetteville, AR		W 24–21	44,820	
November 12	Rice		Baylor Stadium; Waco, TX		W 48–14	26,500	
November 19	at No. 2 Texas		Texas Memorial Stadium; Austin, TX (rivalry)		L 21–24	76,208	
December 31	vs. Oklahoma State*	No. 20	Houston Astrodome; Houston, TX (Astro-Bluebonnet Bowl)	Mizlou	L 14–24	50,090	
*Non-conference game; ^{†}Homecoming; Rankings from AP Poll released prior to the game

== After the season ==
The following players were drafted into professional football following the season.

Player	Position	Round	Pick	Franchise
Bruce Davis	Wide receiver	2	50	Cleveland Browns
Alfred Anderson	Running back	3	67	Minnesota Vikings
Allen Rice	Running back	5	140	Minnesota Vikings
Mark Adickes	Tackle	1 (Sup)	5(Sup)	Kansas City Chiefs
Gerald McNeil	Wide receiver	2(Sup)	44(Sup)	Cleveland Browns
