= 1983 Texas Tech Red Raiders football team =

American college football season

1983 Texas Tech Red Raiders football
- Conference: Southwest Conference
- Record: 3–7–1 (3–4–1 SWC)
- Head coach: Jerry Moore (3rd season)
- Offensive scheme: I formation
- Defensive coordinator: Jim Bates (4th season)
- Base defense: 4–3
- Home stadium: Jones Stadium

1983 Southwest Conference football standings
| | Conf. | | | | | Overall |
| Team | W | | L | | T | W | | L | | T |
|---|---|---|---|---|---|---|---|---|---|---|
| No. 5 Texas $ | 8 | – | 0 | – | 0 | 11 | – | 1 | – | 0 |
| No. 12 SMU | 7 | – | 1 | – | 0 | 10 | – | 2 | – | 0 |
| Baylor | 4 | – | 3 | – | 1 | 7 | – | 4 | – | 1 |
| Texas A&M | 4 | – | 3 | – | 1 | 5 | – | 5 | – | 1 |
| Arkansas | 4 | – | 4 | – | 0 | 6 | – | 5 | – | 0 |
| Texas Tech | 3 | – | 4 | – | 1 | 3 | – | 7 | – | 1 |
| Houston | 3 | – | 5 | – | 0 | 4 | – | 7 | – | 0 |
| TCU | 1 | – | 6 | – | 1 | 1 | – | 8 | – | 2 |
| Rice | 0 | – | 8 | – | 0 | 1 | – | 10 | – | 0 |
$ – Conference champion; Rankings from AP Poll

The 1983 Texas Tech Red Raiders football team represented Texas Tech University as a member of the Southwest Conference (SWC) during the 1983 NCAA Division I-A football season. In their third season under head coach Jerry Moore, the Red Raiders compiled a 3–7–1 record (3–4–1 against SWC opponents), were outscored by a combined total of 253 to 160, and finished in sixth place in the conference. The team played its home games at Clifford B. and Audrey Jones Stadium in Lubbock, Texas.

== Schedule ==
| Date | Opponent | Site | TV | Result | Attendance | Source |
|---|---|---|---|---|---|---|
| September 10 | at Air Force* | Falcon Stadium; Colorado Springs, CO | ABC | L 13–28 | 26,800 | |
| September 24 | at Baylor | Baylor Stadium; Waco, TX (rivalry) | ABC | W 26–11 | 38,000 | |
| October 1 | Texas A&M | Jones Stadium; Lubbock, TX (rivalry) | | W 3–0 | 52,109 | |
| October 8 | New Mexico* | Jones Stadium; Lubbock, TX | | L 10–30 | 36,543 | |
| October 15 | Rice^{†} | Jones Stadium; Lubbock, TX | | W 14–3 | 43,611 | |
| October 22 | Tulsa* | Jones Stadium; Lubbock, TX | | L 20–59 | 34,002 | |
| October 29 | at No. 2 Texas | Texas Memorial Stadium; Austin, TX (rivalry) | | L 3–20 | 75,225 | |
| November 5 | TCU | Jones Stadium; Lubbock, TX (rivalry) | | T 10–10 | 37,507 | |
| November 12 | at No. 7 SMU | Texas Stadium; Irving, TX | | L 7–33 | 30,050 | |
| November 19 | at Houston | Houston Astrodome; Houston, TX (rivalry) | | L 41–43 | 23,153 | |
| November 26 | Arkansas | Jones Stadium; Lubbock, TX (rivalry) | | L 13–16 | 32,978 | |
*Non-conference game; ^{†}Homecoming; Rankings from AP Poll released prior to the game
