= 1983 TCU Horned Frogs football team =

American college football season

1983 TCU Horned Frogs football
- Conference: Southwest Conference
- Record: 1–8–2 (1–6–1 SWC)
- Head coach: Jim Wacker (1st season)
- Defensive coordinator: Tom Mueller (1st season)
- Home stadium: Amon G. Carter Stadium

1983 Southwest Conference football standings
| | Conf. | | | | | Overall |
| Team | W | | L | | T | W | | L | | T |
|---|---|---|---|---|---|---|---|---|---|---|
| No. 5 Texas $ | 8 | – | 0 | – | 0 | 11 | – | 1 | – | 0 |
| No. 12 SMU | 7 | – | 1 | – | 0 | 10 | – | 2 | – | 0 |
| Baylor | 4 | – | 3 | – | 1 | 7 | – | 4 | – | 1 |
| Texas A&M | 4 | – | 3 | – | 1 | 5 | – | 5 | – | 1 |
| Arkansas | 4 | – | 4 | – | 0 | 6 | – | 5 | – | 0 |
| Texas Tech | 3 | – | 4 | – | 1 | 3 | – | 7 | – | 1 |
| Houston | 3 | – | 5 | – | 0 | 4 | – | 7 | – | 0 |
| TCU | 1 | – | 6 | – | 1 | 1 | – | 8 | – | 2 |
| Rice | 0 | – | 8 | – | 0 | 1 | – | 10 | – | 0 |
$ – Conference champion; Rankings from AP Poll

The 1983 TCU Horned Frogs football team represented Texas Christian University (TCU) in the 1983 NCAA Division I-A football season. The Horned Frogs finished the season 1–8–2 overall and 1–6–1 in the Southwest Conference. The team was coached by Jim Wacker, in his first year as head coach. The Frogs played their home games in Amon G. Carter Stadium, which is located on campus in Fort Worth, Texas.

== Schedule ==
| Date | Opponent | Site | Result | Attendance | Source |
|---|---|---|---|---|---|
| September 10 | Kansas* | Amon G. Carter Stadium; Fort Worth, TX | T 16–16 | 27,244 | |
| September 17 | at Kansas State* | KSU Stadium; Manhattan, KS | L 3–20 | 25,400 | |
| September 24 | No. 18 SMU | Amon G. Carter Stadium; Fort Worth, TX (rivalry) | L 17–21 | 34,405 | |
| October 1 | Arkansas | Amon G. Carter Stadium; Fort Worth, TX | L 21–38 | 28,310 | |
| October 8 | at Rice | Rice Stadium; Houston, TX | W 34–3 | 10,000 | |
| October 15 | Ole Miss* | Amon G. Carter Stadium; Fort Worth, TX | L 7–20 | 21,176 | |
| October 22 | at Baylor | Baylor Stadium; Waco, TX (rivalry) | L 21–56 | 35,876 | |
| October 29 | Houston | Amon G. Carter Stadium; Fort Worth, TX | L 21–28 | 16,810 | |
| November 5 | at Texas Tech | Jones Stadium; Lubbock, TX (rivalry) | T 10–10 | 37,507 | |
| November 12 | at No. 2 Texas | Texas Memorial Stadium; Austin, TX (rivalry) | L 14–20 | 61,156 | |
| November 19 | Texas A&M | Amon G. Carter Stadium; Fort Worth, TX (rivalry) | L 10–20 | 26,640 | |
*Non-conference game; Rankings from AP Poll released prior to the game

== Roster ==
1983 TCU Horned Frogs football team roster
Players
Coaches
Offense

| Pos. | # | Name | Class |
|---|---|---|---|
| RB | 36 | Kenneth Davis | So |
| C | 51 | Mike Flynn | Sr |
| WR | 88 | James Maness | Jr |
| QB | 10 | Anthony Sciaraffa | Jr |
| TE | 80 | Dan Sharp | Jr |

Defense

| Pos. | # | Name | Class |
|---|---|---|---|
| LB | 56 | David Cladwell | Fr |
| LB | 89 | Kyle Clifton | Sr |

Special teams

| Pos. | # | Name | Class |

Head coach

- Jim Wacker

Coordinators/assistant coaches

Legend

- (C) Team captain
- (S) Suspended
- (I) Ineligible
- Injured
- Redshirt
