= 1983 SMU Mustangs football team =

American college football season

1983 SMU Mustangs football

Sun Bowl, L 7–28 vs. vs. Alabama
- Conference: Southwest Conference

Ranking
- Coaches: No. 11
- AP: No. 12
- Record: 10–2 (7–1 SWC)
- Head coach: Bobby Collins (2nd season)
- Offensive scheme: No-huddle option
- Defensive coordinator: Bill Clay (2nd season)
- Base defense: 3–4
- Home stadium: Texas Stadium

1983 Southwest Conference football standings
| | Conf. | | | | | Overall |
| Team | W | | L | | T | W | | L | | T |
|---|---|---|---|---|---|---|---|---|---|---|
| No. 5 Texas $ | 8 | – | 0 | – | 0 | 11 | – | 1 | – | 0 |
| No. 12 SMU | 7 | – | 1 | – | 0 | 10 | – | 2 | – | 0 |
| Baylor | 4 | – | 3 | – | 1 | 7 | – | 4 | – | 1 |
| Texas A&M | 4 | – | 3 | – | 1 | 5 | – | 5 | – | 1 |
| Arkansas | 4 | – | 4 | – | 0 | 6 | – | 5 | – | 0 |
| Texas Tech | 3 | – | 4 | – | 1 | 3 | – | 7 | – | 1 |
| Houston | 3 | – | 5 | – | 0 | 4 | – | 7 | – | 0 |
| TCU | 1 | – | 6 | – | 1 | 1 | – | 8 | – | 2 |
| Rice | 0 | – | 8 | – | 0 | 1 | – | 10 | – | 0 |
$ – Conference champion; Rankings from AP Poll

The 1983 SMU Mustangs football team represented Southern Methodist University (SMU) as a member of the Southwest Conference (SWC) during the 1983 NCAA Division I-A football season. Led by second-year head coach Bobby Collins, the Mustangs compiled an overall record 10–2 with a mark of 7–1 in conference play, placing second in the SWC. SMU was invited to the Sun Bowl, there they lost to Alabama.

== Schedule ==
| Date | Time | Opponent | Rank | Site | TV | Result | Attendance | Source |
|---|---|---|---|---|---|---|---|---|
| September 3 | | Louisville* | No. 19 | Texas Stadium; Irving, TX | | W 24–6 | 23,750 | |
| September 10 | | vs. Grambling State* | No. 15 | Independence Stadium; Shreveport, LA (Red River Classic) | | W 20–13 | 21,224 | |
| September 24 | | at TCU | No. 18 | Amon G. Carter Stadium; Fort Worth, TX (rivalry) | | W 21–17 | 34,405 | |
| October 1 | | UT Arlington* | No. 13 | Texas Stadium; Irving, TX | | W 34–0 | 23,578 | |
| October 8 | | Baylor | No. 13 | Texas Stadium; Irving, TX | | W 42–26 | 45,025 | |
| October 22 | 2:30 p.m. | No. 2 Texas | No. 9 | Texas Stadium; Irving, TX | CBS | L 12–15 | 63,805 | |
| October 29 | | at Texas A&M | No. 10 | Kyle Field; College Station, TX | | W 10–7 | 60,219 | |
| November 5 | | Rice | No. 8 | Texas Stadium; Irving, TX (rivalry) | | W 20–6 | 28,750 | |
| November 12 | | Texas Tech | No. 7 | Texas Stadium; Irving, TX | | W 33–7 | 30,000 | |
| November 19 | 11:00 a.m. | at Arkansas | No. 6 | War Memorial Stadium; Little Rock, AR | ABC | W 17–0 | 31,080 | |
| November 26 | | vs. Houston | No. 6 | National Stadium; Tokyo, Japan (Mirage Bowl, rivalry) | | W 34–12 | 70,000 | |
| December 24 | 2:00 p.m. | vs. Alabama* | No. 6 | Sun Bowl; El Paso, TX (Sun Bowl) | CBS | L 7–28 | 41,412 | |
*Non-conference game; Rankings from AP Poll released prior to the game; All times are in Central time

== Roster ==
1983 SMU Mustangs football team roster
Players
Coaches
Offense

| Pos. | # | Name | Class |
|---|---|---|---|
| TE | 87 | Rickey Bolden | Sr |
| OT | 70 | Dale Hellestrae | Jr |
| QB | 2 | Don King | So |
| QB | 11 | Lance McIlhenny | Sr |

Defense

| Pos. | # | Name | Class |
|---|---|---|---|
| CB | 1 | Rod Jones | So |
| CB | 5 | Reggie Phillips | Jr |
| DT | 98 | Mitch Willis | Sr |

Special teams

| Pos. | # | Name | Class |
|---|---|---|---|
| K | 3 | Jeff Harrell | Sr |

Head coach

- Bobby Collins

Coordinators/assistant coaches

Legend

- (C) Team captain
- (S) Suspended
- (I) Ineligible
- Injured
- Redshirt
