= Bobby Micho =

American football player (born 1962)

No. 83, 87, 46
- Positions: Tight end, fullback

Personal information
- Born: March 7, 1962 (age 64); Omaha, Nebraska, U.S.
- Listed height: 6 ft 3 in (1.91 m)
- Listed weight: 236 lb (107 kg)

Career information
- High school: Anderson (Austin, Texas)
- College: Texas
- NFL draft: 1984: 10th round, 272nd overall pick

Career history
- Denver Broncos (1984)*; San Diego Chargers (1984); Denver Broncos (1986–1987)
- * Offseason or practice squad member only

Career NFL statistics
- Receptions: 25
- Receiving yards: 242
- Receiving touchdowns: 2
- Stats at Pro Football Reference

Bobby Micho (born March 7, 1962) is an American former professional football player who was a tight end and fullback in the National Football League (NFL). He played college football for the Texas Longhorns. Micho played in the NFL for the San Diego Chargers in 1984 and the Denver Broncos from 1986 to 1987.
