= 1983 Texas A&M Aggies football team =

American college football season

1983 Texas A&M Aggies football
- Conference: Southwest Conference
- Record: 5–5–1 (4–3–1 SWC)
- Head coach: Jackie Sherrill (2nd season)
- Offensive coordinator: Pat Ruel (2nd season)
- Offensive scheme: Pro set
- Defensive coordinator: R. C. Slocum (4th season)
- Base defense: 3–4
- Home stadium: Kyle Field

1983 Southwest Conference football standings
	Conf.					Overall
Team	W		L		T	W		L		T
No. 5 Texas $	8	–	0	–	0	11	–	1	–	0
No. 12 SMU	7	–	1	–	0	10	–	2	–	0
Baylor	4	–	3	–	1	7	–	4	–	1
Texas A&M	4	–	3	–	1	5	–	5	–	1
Arkansas	4	–	4	–	0	6	–	5	–	0
Texas Tech	3	–	4	–	1	3	–	7	–	1
Houston	3	–	5	–	0	4	–	7	–	0
TCU	1	–	6	–	1	1	–	8	–	2
Rice	0	–	8	–	0	1	–	10	–	0
$ – Conference champion; Rankings from AP Poll

The 1983 Texas A&M Aggies football team represented Texas A&M University in the 1983 NCAA Division I-A football season as a member of the Southwest Conference (SWC). The Aggies were led by head coach Jackie Sherrill in his second season and finished with a record of five wins, five losses and one (5–5–1 overall, 4–3–1 in the SWC). The season is chronicled in the SEC Storied documentary, No Experience Required.

== Schedule ==
Date	Opponent	Site	TV	Result	Attendance	Source
September 3	California*	Kyle Field; College Station, TX		L 17–19	51,971	
September 17	Arkansas State*	Kyle Field; College Station, TX		W 38–0	50,064	
September 24	Oklahoma State*	Kyle Field; College Station, TX		L 15–34	53,638	
October 1	at Texas Tech	Jones Stadium; Lubbock, TX (rivalry)		L 0–3	52,109	
October 8	Houston	Kyle Field; College Station, TX		W 30–7	57,622	
October 15	at Baylor	Baylor Stadium; Waco, TX (Battle of the Brazos)	WTBS	T 13–13	40,000	
October 22	at Rice	Rice Stadium; Houston, TX		W 29–10	40,000	
October 29	No. 10 SMU	Kyle Field; College Station, TX		L 7–10	60,219	
November 12	Arkansas	Kyle Field; College Station, TX (rivalry)		W 36–23	58,597	
November 19	at TCU	Amon G. Carter Stadium; Fort Worth, TX (rivalry)		W 20–10	26,640	
November 26	No. 2 Texas	Kyle Field; College Station, TX (rivalry)	ABC	L 13–45	76,751	
*Non-conference game; Rankings from AP Poll released prior to the game

== Roster ==
1983 Texas A&M Aggies football team roster
Players
Coaches
Offense

Pos.	#	Name	Class
QB		Kevin Murray	Fr
RB		Thomas Sanders	Jr

Defense

Pos.	#	Name	Class
DL	22	Billy Cannon Jr.	Sr
DL	53	Ray Childress	Jr
LB		Jeff Fuller	Sr
LB	11	Johnny Holland	Fr

Special teams

Pos.	#	Name	Class

Head coach

- Jackie Sherrill

Coordinators/assistant coaches

- George Pugh – Assistant

Legend

- (C) Team captain
- (S) Suspended
- (I) Ineligible
- Injured
- Redshirt
