= John Haines (American football) =

American football player (born 1961)

No. 90
- Position: Defensive lineman

Personal information
- Born: December 16, 1961 (age 64); Fort Worth, Texas, U.S.
- Listed height: 6 ft 6 in (1.98 m)
- Listed weight: 266 lb (121 kg)

Career information
- High school: Arlington Heights (Fort Worth)
- College: Texas
- NFL draft: 1984: 7th round, 180th overall pick

Career history
- Minnesota Vikings (1984); Indianapolis Colts (1986–1987)
- Stats at Pro Football Reference

John Yancy Haines (born December 16, 1961) is an American former professional football defensive lineman who played in the National Football League (NFL) with the Minnesota Vikings and Indianapolis Colts. He played college football for the Texas Longhorns and was selected by the Vikings in the seventh round of the 1984 NFL draft.

== Early life ==
John Yancy Haines was born on December 16, 1961, in Fort Worth, Texas. He attended Arlington Heights High School in Fort Worth.

== College career ==
Haines enrolled at the University of Texas at Austin to play college football for the Longhorns. He was a four-year letterman from 1980 to 1983. He became a starter in 1981 after Kenneth Sims suffered a knee injury.

== Professional career ==
Haines was selected by the Minnesota Vikings in the seventh round, with the 180th overall pick, of the 1984 NFL draft. He signed with the team on June 26. He was placed on the reserve/physically unable to perform list on August 8 and was activated on October 24. Haines played in eight games for the Vikings during the 1984 season as a reserve defensive lineman, posting two sacks, one forced fumble, and one fumble recovery. He was released on August 14, 1985, after the first game of the 1985 preseason.

Haines signed with the Indianapolis Colts on March 24, 1986. He appeared in 11 games in a backup role in 1986 and did not record any statistics. He was placed on injured reserve on September 7, 1987, before the start of the 1987 regular season. Haines was released on October 26, 1987.
