= 1983 Houston Cougars football team =

American college football season

1983 Houston Cougars football
- Conference: Southwest Conference
- Record: 4–7 (3–5 SWC)
- Head coach: Bill Yeoman (22nd season)
- Defensive coordinator: Don Todd (12th season)
- Captains: Eugene Lockhart; Duane Losack; Dwyane Love
- Home stadium: Houston Astrodome

1983 Southwest Conference football standings
	Conf.					Overall
Team	W		L		T	W		L		T
No. 5 Texas $	8	–	0	–	0	11	–	1	–	0
No. 12 SMU	7	–	1	–	0	10	–	2	–	0
Baylor	4	–	3	–	1	7	–	4	–	1
Texas A&M	4	–	3	–	1	5	–	5	–	1
Arkansas	4	–	4	–	0	6	–	5	–	0
Texas Tech	3	–	4	–	1	3	–	7	–	1
Houston	3	–	5	–	0	4	–	7	–	0
TCU	1	–	6	–	1	1	–	8	–	2
Rice	0	–	8	–	0	1	–	10	–	0
$ – Conference champion; Rankings from AP Poll

The 1983 Houston Cougars football team represented the University of Houston during the 1983 NCAA Division I-A football season. The Cougars were led by 22nd-year head coach Bill Yeoman and played their home games at the Houston Astrodome in Houston. The team competed as members of the Southwest Conference, finishing in seventh. Houston finished the season with a record of 4–7, their first losing season since 1975.

== Schedule ==
Date	Opponent	Site	Result	Attendance	Source
September 1	at Rice	Rice Stadium; Houston, TX (rivalry)	W 45–14	30,000	
September 10	Miami (FL)*	Houston Astrodome; Houston, TX	L 7–29	25,000	
September 17	Lamar*	Houston Astrodome; Houston, TX	W 42–35	25,456	
September 24	at Oregon*	Autzen Stadium; Eugene, OR	L 14–15	26,105	
October 1	Baylor	Houston Astrodome; Houston, TX (rivalry)	L 21–42	26,640	
October 8	at Texas A&M	Kyle Field; College Station, TX	L 7–30	57,622	
October 22	at Arkansas	Razorback Stadium; Fayetteville, AR	L 3–24	41,080	
October 29	at TCU	Amon G. Carter Stadium; Fort Worth, TX	W 28–21	16,810	
November 5	No. 2 Texas^{†}	Houston Astrodome; Houston, TX	L 3–9	47,103	
November 19	Texas Tech	Houston Astrodome; Houston, TX (rivalry)	W 43–41	23,153	
November 26	vs. No. 6 SMU	National Stadium; Tokyo, Japan (Mirage Bowl, rivalry)	L 12–34	70,000	
*Non-conference game; ^{†}Homecoming; Rankings from AP Poll released prior to the game
