= Allen Rice =

American football player (born 1962)

No. 36, 31
- Position: Running back

Personal information
- Born: April 5, 1962 (age 64); Houston, Texas, U.S.
- Listed height: 5 ft 10 in (1.78 m)
- Listed weight: 203 lb (92 kg)

Career information
- High school: Klein (Klein, Texas)
- College: Baylor
- NFL draft: 1984: 5th round, 140th overall pick

Career history
- Minnesota Vikings (1984–1990); Green Bay Packers (1991)

Career NFL statistics
- Rushing yards: 1,034
- Rushing average: 3.1
- Total touchdowns: 13
- Stats at Pro Football Reference

Allen Troy Rice (born April 5, 1962) is an American former professional football player. He played running back for eight seasons in the National Football League (NFL) for the Minnesota Vikings and Green Bay Packers.
