= 1983 Arkansas Razorbacks football team =

American college football season

1983 Arkansas Razorbacks football
- Conference: Southwest Conference
- Record: 6–5 (4–4 SWC)
- Head coach: Lou Holtz (7th season)
- Captains: Ron Faurot; Mark Mistler; Milton Fields
- Home stadium: Razorback Stadium; War Memorial Stadium

1983 Southwest Conference football standings
	Conf.					Overall
Team	W		L		T	W		L		T
No. 5 Texas $	8	–	0	–	0	11	–	1	–	0
No. 12 SMU	7	–	1	–	0	10	–	2	–	0
Baylor	4	–	3	–	1	7	–	4	–	1
Texas A&M	4	–	3	–	1	5	–	5	–	1
Arkansas	4	–	4	–	0	6	–	5	–	0
Texas Tech	3	–	4	–	1	3	–	7	–	1
Houston	3	–	5	–	0	4	–	7	–	0
TCU	1	–	6	–	1	1	–	8	–	2
Rice	0	–	8	–	0	1	–	10	–	0
$ – Conference champion; Rankings from AP Poll

The 1983 Arkansas Razorbacks football team represented the University of Arkansas during the 1983 NCAA Division I-A football season. Ron Faurot received first-team All-American honors as a defensive lineman for the Hogs.

After the season in mid-December, Arkansas athletic director Frank Broyles asked Lou Holtz to resign after seven years as head coach, partly because of the team's decline, but also due to political statements made by Holtz earlier in the year. Holtz decided to resign rather than be fired, and went to Minnesota. Arkansas soon hired Air Force head coach Ken Hatfield, an alumnus who shined for the Hogs as a defensive back on the 1964 national championship team.

== Schedule ==
Date	Opponent	Site	TV	Result	Attendance	Source
September 10	Tulsa*	Razorback Stadium; Fayetteville, AR		W 17–14	45,202	
September 17	New Mexico*	War Memorial Stadium; Little Rock, AR		W 17–0	54,212	
September 24	at Ole Miss*	Mississippi Veterans Memorial Stadium; Jackson, MS (rivalry)		L 10–13	55,720	
October 1	at TCU	Amon G. Carter Stadium; Fort Worth, TX		W 38–21	28,310	
October 15	No. 2 Texas	War Memorial Stadium; Little Rock, AR (rivalry)	CBS	L 3–31	54,882	
October 22	Houston	Razorback Stadium; Fayetteville, AR		W 24–3	41,080	
October 29	Rice	War Memorial Stadium; Little Rock, AR		W 35–0	52,986	
November 5	Baylor	Razorback Stadium; Fayetteville, AR		L 21–24	44,820	
November 12	Texas A&M	Kyle Field; College Station, TX (rivalry)		L 23–36	58,597	
November 19	No. 6 SMU	War Memorial Stadium; Little Rock, AR	ABC	L 0–17	31,080	
November 26	at Texas Tech	Jones Stadium; Lubbock, TX (rivalry)		W 16–13	32,978	
*Non-conference game; Rankings from AP Poll released prior to the game

== Roster ==
- QB Brad Taylor
