= Jeff Leiding =

American football player (1961–2014)

No. 60, 92
- Position: Linebacker

Personal information
- Born: October 28, 1961; Kansas City, Missouri, U.S.
- Died: July 13, 2014 (aged 52); St. Louis, Missouri, U.S.
- Listed height: 6 ft 3 in (1.91 m)
- Listed weight: 232 lb (105 kg)

Career information
- High school: Union (Tulsa, Oklahoma)
- College: Texas
- NFL draft: 1984: 5th round, 129th overall pick

Career history
- St. Louis Cardinals (1984)*; San Antonio Gunslingers (1985); Indianapolis Colts (1986–1988)
- * Offseason or practice squad member only

Awards and highlights
- Consensus All-American (1983); First-team All-SWC (1983)

Career NFL statistics
- Sacks: 1
- Safeties: 2
- Stats at Pro Football Reference

Jeffrey James Leiding (October 28, 1961 – July 13, 2014) was an American professional football player who was a linebacker in the National Football League (NFL) and United States Football League (USFL).

== Early life and college ==
Jeffrey James Leiding was born and raised in Kansas City, Missouri. He was born on October 28, 1961. He was a standout player at Hickman Mills High School in Kansas City as a sophomore and junior. When his father accepted a job at a bank in Tulsa, Oklahoma prior to his senior year, Leiding finished his prep career at Union High School. He chose to play college football for the Texas Longhorns. He lettered for the Longhorns from 1980 to 1983, earning consensus All-American honors as a senior.

== Professional career ==
Leiding was selected by the St. Louis Cardinals in the fifth round, with the 129th overall pick, of the 1984 NFL draft. He was also a territorial selection of the San Antonio Gunslingers of the United States Football League (USFL) in 1984. He signed with the Cardinals on July 16 but did not make the team, being released on August 27, 1984. He then played in ten games for the Gunslingers during the 1985 USFL season.

Leiding signed with the NFL's Indianapolis Colts on May 12, 1986. He was released on August 26 but later re-signed on September 30, 1986. He played in 12 games for the Colts in 1986 and recorded one safety. He was released the next year on August 19, 1987. On September 23, Leiding rejoined the Colts as a replacement player during the 1987 NFLPA strike. He was retained after the strike ended. Overall, he appeared in nine games, starting three, and totaled one safety and one sack that season before being placed on injured reserve on December 1, 1987. He was placed on the physically unable to perform list on July 17, 1988. Leiding became a free agent after the 1988 season.

== Death ==
Leiding died of a heart attack on July 13, 2014, in St. Louis, Missouri.
