= Dwight Collins =

American football player (born 1961)

No. 84
- Position: Wide receiver

Personal information
- Born: August 23, 1961 (age 65); Rochester, New York, U.S.
- Listed height: 6 ft 1 in (1.85 m)
- Listed weight: 208 lb (94 kg)

Career information
- High school: Beaver Falls (Beaver Falls, Pennsylvania)
- College: Pittsburgh
- NFL draft: 1984: 6th round, 154th overall pick

Career history
- Minnesota Vikings (1984); Detroit Lions (1986)*
- * Offseason or practice squad member only

Awards and highlights
- Second-team All-American (1983); First-team All-East (1982)

Career NFL statistics
- Receptions: 11
- Receiving yards: 143
- Receiving touchdowns: 1
- Stats at Pro Football Reference

Dwight Dean Collins (born August 23, 1961) is an American former professional football player who was a wide receiver in the National Football League (NFL).

Collins was born in Rochester, New York and played scholastically at Beaver Falls High School in Pennsylvania.

Collins played college football at Pittsburgh. In his 1980 freshman season, Collins played on a Pitt team that included eight other future NFL players: Rickey Jackson, Dan Marino, Russ Grimm, Jimbo Covert, Bill Maas, Hugh Green, and Tim Lewis. Collins led the team in receiving that year with 30 receptions for 827 yards and 10 touchdowns. He totaled 133 receptions for 2,264 yards and 24 touchdowns in his four college seasons. As a senior, he was honored by the Newspaper Enterprise Association (NEA) as a second-team All-American.

Collins was selected by the Minnesota Vikings in the sixth round of the 1984 NFL draft, and played one season for them. He appeared in all 16 games, with 1 start, and had 11 receptions for 143 yards and 1 touchdown.
