= Craig Curry =

American gridiron football player (born 1961)

No. 31, 45
- Position: Defensive back

Personal information
- Born: July 20, 1961 (age 65); Houston, Texas, U.S.
- Listed height: 6 ft 0 in (1.83 m)
- Listed weight: 187 lb (85 kg)

Career information
- High school: Kashmere (Houston)
- College: Texas
- NFL draft: 1984: 4th round, 93rd overall pick

Career history
- Indianapolis Colts (1984)*; Tampa Bay Buccaneers (1984–1986); Indianapolis Colts (1987)
- * Offseason or practice squad member only

Awards and highlights
- 1981 Cotton Bowl Classic Champion; 1983 Southwest Conference Champion

Career NFL statistics
- Interceptions: 3
- Sacks: 1
- Stats at Pro Football Reference

Craig Anthony Curry (born July 20, 1961) is an American former professional football player who was a defensive back in the National Football League (NFL) for the Tampa Bay Buccaneers and Indianapolis Colts. Prior to that he played college football for the Texas Longhorns where he fumbled a punt in the 1984 Cotton Bowl that led to Georgia's game winning TD and Texas losing out on the National Championship, which instead went to Miami.

== Early life ==
Curry went to Houston Kashmere High School where he played football, ran track and graduated 5th in a class of 500. In football he was a defensive back. In track, he was on the 4x100 team.

== College Career ==
Curry played football at Texas from 1980-1983 and graduated in 1984 with a BBA in Engineering Route to Management.

In his freshman year, he played in 3 games in which he had 12 tackles, an interception and a broken up pass. The team finished 7-4 and lost the Astro-Bluebonnet Bowl.

In his sophomore year, he played in 9 games, amassing 34 tackles, 4 Tackles for Loss (TFLs), 2 interceptions and 3 broken up passes, including one that was intercepted by Mossy Cade. The Longhorns went 10-1-1, beat Alabama in the Cotton Bowl Classic and finished the season ranked #2.

In his junior year, he played in all 11 games, racking up 50 tackles, 5 TFLs, 2 forced fumbles (FF), a team-leading 4 fumble recoveries (FR), 2 interceptions, 5 Quarterback Hits (QBH) and 9 broken up passes. Against Utah, he tipped the potentially game-tying 2 point conversion pass attempt. Against Oklahoma, he slipped on the wet turf and gave up a 1st quarter 63-yard touchdown as the Sooners upset the Longhorns, but he also had key turnovers against Houston and Texas A&M. The Longhorns went 9-3, lost the 1982 Sun Bowl to North Carolina and finished ranked #17/#18.

In his senior year - 1983 - he played in all 11 games again and recorded 37 tackles, 5 TFLs, 1 FF, 1 FR, 2 interceptions for 37 yards, 8 QBH, and 10 broken up passes. He helped the Longhorns win the 1983 Southwest Conference Championship and, going into the bowl games, the #2 ranking. A win in the Cotton Bowl would have won them the National Championship, but late in the 4th quarter, with Texas up 9-3, Curry muffed a punt which Georgia recovered and turned into the game winning touchdown drive. Texas finished the season ranked 5th.

After his college playing career was over, he played in the 1984 East–West Shrine Bowl where he had a 39 yard interception return that set up a touchdown.

== Pro Career ==
In January he was selected by the San Antonio Gunslingers in the 1984 USFL territorial draft. In May he was selected by the Colts in the fourth round of the 1984 NFL draft. He signed with the Colts later that month, but was cut by them near the end of camp that year.

In November he was signed by the Tampa Bay Buccaneers and played in 5 games with them during the 1984 season, despite a midseason hand injury.

Following an injury to Paul Dombroski, he made his first start for Tampa in November 1985 in a game where he had a sack, a pass deflection and 9 tackles. He played in 16 games that season, and started 7, as the Buccaneers finished a 2-14 season.

A free agent at the end of the 1985 season, he signed a new contract with the Buccaneers before the 1986 season. He again played in 16 games, starting 10, with 2 interceptions and a 6 yard kickoff return, as the Buccaneers again went 2-14.

After the 1986 season the Buccaneers did not exercise their option to retain Curry who again became a free agent. He was re-signed by the Bucs on the eve of training camp, but was then released on August 18th. A few weeks later, during the player's strike he was signed by the Colts. He played in all 3 scab games recording an interception. He was released when the strike ended.

== Later life ==
After retiring from football, Curry became a stockbroker for Shearson Lehman Brothers/American Express. He left that to start a financial planning company called Opulent Management. He retired from financial planning in 2011 and moved back to Houston.
