= 1983 Memphis State Tigers football team =

American college football season

1983 Memphis State Tigers football
- Conference: Independent
- Record: 6–4–1
- Head coach: Rex Dockery (3rd season)
- Captains: Greg Montgomery; Derrick Crawford
- Home stadium: Liberty Bowl Memorial Stadium

1983 NCAA Division I-A independents football records
	Conf.					Overall
Team	W		L		T	W		L		T
No. 1 Miami (FL)		–		–		11	–	1	–	0
Virginia Tech		–		–		9	–	2	–	0
No. 19 Boston College		–		–		9	–	3	–	0
No. 16 West Virginia		–		–		9	–	3	–	0
No. 20 East Carolina		–		–		8	–	3	–	0
No. 18 Pittsburgh		–		–		8	–	3	–	1
Florida State		–		–		8	–	4	–	0
Penn State		–		–		8	–	4	–	1
Southern Miss		–		–		7	–	4	–	0
Memphis State		–		–		6	–	4	–	1
Notre Dame		–		–		7	–	5	–	0
Syracuse		–		–		6	–	5	–	0
South Carolina		–		–		5	–	6	–	0
Cincinnati			–			4	–	6	–	1
Southwestern Louisiana		–		–		4	–	6	–	0
Temple		–		–		4	–	7	–	0
Tulane		–		–		4	–	7	–	0
Louisville		–		–		3	–	8	–	0
Navy		–		–		3	–	8	–	0
Rutgers		–		–		3	–	8	–	0
Army		–		–		2	–	9	–	0
Rankings from AP Poll

The 1983 Memphis State Tigers football team represented Memphis State University (now known as the University of Memphis) as an independent during the 1983 NCAA Division I-A football season. In its third and final season under head coach Rex Dockery, the team compiled a 6–4–1 record and outscored opponents by a total of 274 to 205. The team played its home games at Liberty Bowl Memorial Stadium in Memphis, Tennessee.

The team's statistical leaders included Danny Sparkman with 1,390 passing yards, Punkin Williams with 546 rushing yards, Derrick Crawford with 594 receiving yards, and Don Glosson with 71 points scored (29 extra points, 14 field goals).

== Schedule ==
Date	Opponent	Site	Result	Attendance	Source
September 3	Ole Miss	Liberty Bowl Memorial Stadium; Memphis, TN (rivalry)	W 37–17	51,323	
September 10	at No. 8 North Carolina	Kenan Memorial Stadium; Chapel Hill, NC	L 10–24	49,000	
September 17	Virginia Tech	Liberty Bowl Memorial Stadium; Memphis, TN	L 10–17	39,528	
October 1	at No. 6 Alabama	Bryant–Denny Stadium; Tuscaloosa, AL	L 13–44	60,210	
October 8	Tulane	Liberty Bowl Memorial Stadium; Memphis, TN	W 28–25	29,367	
October 15	Southern Miss^{†}	Liberty Bowl Memorial Stadium; Memphis, TN (Black and Blue Bowl)	L 20–27	35,323	
October 29	at Vanderbilt	Vanderbilt Stadium; Nashville, TN	W 24–7	40,485	
November 5	at Mississippi State	Mississippi Veterans Memorial Stadium; Jackson, MS	W 30–13	28,203	
November 12	at Cincinnati	Riverfront Stadium; Cincinnati, OH (rivalry)	W 43–10	12,125	
November 19	Arkansas State*	Liberty Bowl Memorial Stadium; Memphis, TN (Paint Bucket Bowl)	T 14–14	28,130	
November 24	at Louisville	Cardinal Stadium; Louisville, KY (rivalry)	W 45–7	9,574	
*Non-conference game; ^{†}Homecoming; Rankings from AP Poll released prior to the game
