= 1983 South Carolina Gamecocks football team =

American college football season

1983 South Carolina Gamecocks football
- Conference: Independent
- Record: 5–6
- Head coach: Joe Morrison (1st season)
- Offensive coordinator: Frank Sadler (1st season)
- Defensive coordinator: Tom Gadd (1st season)
- Home stadium: Williams–Brice Stadium

1983 NCAA Division I-A independents football records
	Conf.					Overall
Team	W		L		T	W		L		T
No. 1 Miami (FL)		–		–		11	–	1	–	0
Virginia Tech		–		–		9	–	2	–	0
No. 19 Boston College		–		–		9	–	3	–	0
No. 16 West Virginia		–		–		9	–	3	–	0
No. 20 East Carolina		–		–		8	–	3	–	0
No. 18 Pittsburgh		–		–		8	–	3	–	1
Florida State		–		–		8	–	4	–	0
Penn State		–		–		8	–	4	–	1
Southern Miss		–		–		7	–	4	–	0
Memphis State		–		–		6	–	4	–	1
Notre Dame		–		–		7	–	5	–	0
Syracuse		–		–		6	–	5	–	0
South Carolina		–		–		5	–	6	–	0
Cincinnati			–			4	–	6	–	1
Southwestern Louisiana		–		–		4	–	6	–	0
Temple		–		–		4	–	7	–	0
Tulane		–		–		4	–	7	–	0
Louisville		–		–		3	–	8	–	0
Navy		–		–		3	–	8	–	0
Rutgers		–		–		3	–	8	–	0
Army		–		–		2	–	9	–	0
Rankings from AP Poll

The 1983 South Carolina Gamecocks football team represented the University of South Carolina as an independent during the 1983 NCAA Division I-A football season. The team played its home games at Williams–Brice Stadium. Led by first-year head coach Joe Morrison, the Gamecocks compiled a record of 5–6.

After years of campaigning by former Gamecock quarterback Tommy Suggs and waiting for the stadium's sound system to be updated, the Gamecocks introduced their "2001" entrance in Morrison's first year as head coach. The Gamecocks began entering Williams–Brice Stadium to the introduction of Also sprach Zarathustra, popularly known from the film 2001: A Space Odyssey. The entrance remains a staple of Gamecock home football games, and has since been considered one of the best entrances in college football.

Another highlight of the season was the 38–14 home victory over Southern California. Excited fans jumping up and down caused the upper decks to sway. Asked about the movement, Morrison said: “If they ain’t swayin’, we ain’t playin’.”

== Schedule ==
Date	Opponent	Site	TV	Result	Attendance	Source
September 3	No. 11 North Carolina	Williams–Brice Stadium; Columbia, SC (rivalry)		L 8–24	72,400	
September 10	Miami (OH)	Williams–Brice Stadium; Columbia, SC		W 24–3	63,475	
September 17	at Duke	Wallace Wade Stadium; Durham, NC		W 31–24	20,500	
September 24	at No. 14 Georgia	Sanford Stadium; Athens, GA (rivalry)		L 13–31	82,122	
October 1	USC	Williams–Brice Stadium; Columbia, SC		W 38–14	74,200	
October 8	Notre Dame	Williams–Brice Stadium; Columbia, SC		L 6–30	74,500	
October 22	LSU	Tiger Stadium; Baton Rouge, LA	PPV	L 6–20	71,951	
October 29	NC State	Williams–Brice Stadium; Columbia, SC		W 31–17	69,400	
November 5	at Florida State	Doak Campbell Stadium; Tallahassee, FL		L 30–45	55,542	
November 12	Navy	Williams–Brice Stadium; Columbia, SC		W 31–7	64,800	
November 19	No. 13 Clemson	Williams–Brice Stadium; Columbia, SC (rivalry)		L 13–22	74,550	
Rankings from Coaches' Poll released prior to the game
