= 1983 Syracuse Orangemen football team =

American college football season

1983 Syracuse Orangemen football
- Conference: Independent
- Record: 6–5
- Head coach: Dick MacPherson (3rd season)
- Captains: Blaise Winter; Brent Ziegler
- Home stadium: Carrier Dome

1983 Major eastern college football independents records
	Conf.					Overall
Team	W		L		T	W		L		T
Penn State	4	–	1	–	1	8	–	4	–	1
No. 16 West Virginia	4	–	2	–	0	9	–	3	–	0
No. 18 Pittsburgh	2	–	1	–	1	8	–	3	–	1
No. 19 Boston College $	3	–	2	–	0	9	–	3	–	0
Syracuse	3	–	3	–	0	6	–	5	–	0
Temple	2	–	4	–	0	4	–	7	–	0
Rutgers	0	–	5	–	0	3	–	8	–	0
$ – Lambert Trophy Winner; Rankings from AP Poll

1983 NCAA Division I-A independents football records
	Conf.					Overall
Team	W		L		T	W		L		T
No. 1 Miami (FL)		–		–		11	–	1	–	0
Virginia Tech		–		–		9	–	2	–	0
No. 19 Boston College		–		–		9	–	3	–	0
No. 16 West Virginia		–		–		9	–	3	–	0
No. 20 East Carolina		–		–		8	–	3	–	0
No. 18 Pittsburgh		–		–		8	–	3	–	1
Florida State		–		–		8	–	4	–	0
Penn State		–		–		8	–	4	–	1
Southern Miss		–		–		7	–	4	–	0
Memphis State		–		–		6	–	4	–	1
Notre Dame		–		–		7	–	5	–	0
Syracuse		–		–		6	–	5	–	0
South Carolina		–		–		5	–	6	–	0
Cincinnati			–			4	–	6	–	1
Southwestern Louisiana		–		–		4	–	6	–	0
Temple		–		–		4	–	7	–	0
Tulane		–		–		4	–	7	–	0
Louisville		–		–		3	–	8	–	0
Navy		–		–		3	–	8	–	0
Rutgers		–		–		3	–	8	–	0
Army		–		–		2	–	9	–	0
Rankings from AP Poll

The 1983 Syracuse Orangemen football team represented Syracuse University as an independent during the 1983 NCAA Division I-A football season. Led by third-year head coach Dick MacPherson, the Orangemen compiled a record of 6–5. Syracuse played home games at the Carrier Dome in Syracuse, New York.

== Schedule ==
Date	Opponent	Site	Result	Attendance	Source
September 2	at Temple	Franklin Field; Philadelphia, PA	L 6–17	11,549	
September 10	Kent State	Carrier Dome; Syracuse, NY	W 22–10	24,605	
September 17	Northwestern	Carrier Dome; Syracuse, NY	W 35–0	25,979	
September 24	Rutgers	Carrier Dome; Syracuse, NY	W 17–13	26,497	
October 1	at No. 1 Nebraska	Memorial Stadium; Lincoln, NE	L 7–63	76,382	
October 8	at No. 16 Maryland	Byrd Stadium; College Park, MD	L 13–34	43,700	
October 15	Penn State	Carrier Dome; Syracuse, NY (rivalry)	L 6–17	50,010	
October 29	at Pittsburgh	Pitt Stadium; Pittsburgh, PA (rivalry)	L 10–13	52,374	
November 5	at Navy	Navy–Marine Corps Memorial Stadium; Annapolis, MD	W 14–7	22,009	
November 12	No. 13 Boston College	Carrier Dome; Syracuse, NY	W 21–10	41,225	
November 19	No. 14 West Virginia	Carrier Dome; Syracuse, NY (rivalry)	W 27–16	36,661	
Rankings from AP Poll released prior to the game

== NFL draft ==
Mike Charles (DT) was selected by Miami Dolphins in second round (55th overall).
