= 1983 Temple Owls football team =

American college football season

1983 Temple Owls football
- Conference: Independent
- Record: 4–7
- Head coach: Bruce Arians (1st season)
- Home stadium: Veterans Stadium, Franklin Field

1983 Major eastern college football independents records
	Conf.					Overall
Team	W		L		T	W		L		T
Penn State	4	–	1	–	1	8	–	4	–	1
No. 16 West Virginia	4	–	2	–	0	9	–	3	–	0
No. 18 Pittsburgh	2	–	1	–	1	8	–	3	–	1
No. 19 Boston College $	3	–	2	–	0	9	–	3	–	0
Syracuse	3	–	3	–	0	6	–	5	–	0
Temple	2	–	4	–	0	4	–	7	–	0
Rutgers	0	–	5	–	0	3	–	8	–	0
$ – Lambert Trophy Winner; Rankings from AP Poll

1983 NCAA Division I-A independents football records
	Conf.					Overall
Team	W		L		T	W		L		T
No. 1 Miami (FL)		–		–		11	–	1	–	0
Virginia Tech		–		–		9	–	2	–	0
No. 19 Boston College		–		–		9	–	3	–	0
No. 16 West Virginia		–		–		9	–	3	–	0
No. 20 East Carolina		–		–		8	–	3	–	0
No. 18 Pittsburgh		–		–		8	–	3	–	1
Florida State		–		–		8	–	4	–	0
Penn State		–		–		8	–	4	–	1
Southern Miss		–		–		7	–	4	–	0
Memphis State		–		–		6	–	4	–	1
Notre Dame		–		–		7	–	5	–	0
Syracuse		–		–		6	–	5	–	0
South Carolina		–		–		5	–	6	–	0
Cincinnati			–			4	–	6	–	1
Southwestern Louisiana		–		–		4	–	6	–	0
Temple		–		–		4	–	7	–	0
Tulane		–		–		4	–	7	–	0
Louisville		–		–		3	–	8	–	0
Navy		–		–		3	–	8	–	0
Rutgers		–		–		3	–	8	–	0
Army		–		–		2	–	9	–	0
Rankings from AP Poll

The 1983 Temple Owls football team was an American football team that represented Temple University as an independent during the 1983 NCAA Division I-A football season. In its first season under head coach Bruce Arians, the team compiled a 4–7 record and was outscored by a total of 241 to 170. The team played its home games at Veterans Stadium and Franklin Field in Philadelphia.

The team's statistical leaders included Tim Riordan with 1,732 passing yards, Paul Palmer with 628 rushing yards and 48 points scored, and Russell Carter with 482 receiving yards.

== Schedule ==
Date	Opponent	Site	Result	Attendance	Source
September 2	Syracuse	Franklin Field; Philadelphia, PA	W 17–6	11,549	
September 10	at Pittsburgh	Pitt Stadium; Pittsburgh, PA	L 0–35	45,713	
September 24	Penn State	Veterans Stadium; Philadelphia, PA	L 18–23	35,760	
October 1	Boston College	Franklin Field; Philadelphia, PA	L 15–18	7,033	
October 8	at Cincinnati	Riverfront Stadium; Cincinnati, OH	L 16–31	18,272	
October 15	East Carolina	Franklin Field; Philadelphia, PA	L 11–24	5,461	
October 22	at Delaware	Delaware Stadium; Newark, DE	W 23–16	18,096	
October 28	at No. 6 Georgia	Sanford Stadium; Athens, GA	L 14–31	81,822	
November 5	at No. 17 West Virginia	Mountaineer Field; Morgantown, WV	L 9–27	50,514	
November 12	Louisville	Veterans Stadium; Philadelphia, PA	W 24–7	3,021	
November 19	at Rutgers	Rutgers Stadium; Piscataway, NJ	W 24–23	14,261	
Rankings from AP Poll released prior to the game
