= 1983 Notre Dame Fighting Irish football team =

American college football season

1983 Notre Dame Fighting Irish football

Liberty Bowl champion

Liberty Bowl, W 19–18 vs. Boston College
- Conference: Independent
- Record: 7–5
- Head coach: Gerry Faust (3rd season)
- Defensive coordinator: Jim Johnson
- Captains: Blair Kiel; Stacey Toran
- Home stadium: Notre Dame Stadium

1983 NCAA Division I-A independents football records
	Conf.					Overall
Team	W		L		T	W		L		T
No. 1 Miami (FL)		–		–		11	–	1	–	0
Virginia Tech		–		–		9	–	2	–	0
No. 19 Boston College		–		–		9	–	3	–	0
No. 16 West Virginia		–		–		9	–	3	–	0
No. 20 East Carolina		–		–		8	–	3	–	0
No. 18 Pittsburgh		–		–		8	–	3	–	1
Florida State		–		–		8	–	4	–	0
Penn State		–		–		8	–	4	–	1
Southern Miss		–		–		7	–	4	–	0
Memphis State		–		–		6	–	4	–	1
Notre Dame		–		–		7	–	5	–	0
Syracuse		–		–		6	–	5	–	0
South Carolina		–		–		5	–	6	–	0
Cincinnati			–			4	–	6	–	1
Southwestern Louisiana		–		–		4	–	6	–	0
Temple		–		–		4	–	7	–	0
Tulane		–		–		4	–	7	–	0
Louisville		–		–		3	–	8	–	0
Navy		–		–		3	–	8	–	0
Rutgers		–		–		3	–	8	–	0
Army		–		–		2	–	9	–	0
Rankings from AP Poll

The 1983 Notre Dame Fighting Irish football team was an American football team that represented the University of Notre Dame as an independent during the 1983 NCAA Division I-A football season. In their third year under head coach Gerry Faust, the Irish compiled a 7–5 record, outscored opponents by a total of 297 to 159, and were unranked for the third consecutive year in both the final AP and UPI polls. Despite losing the last three games of the regular season, the Irish were invited to play in the Liberty Bowl where they defeated No. 13 Boston College, 19–18.

Running back Allen Pinkett led the team with 1,394 rushing yards, 28 pass receptions, and 108 points scored and received first-team honors from Football News and The Sporting News on the 1983 All-America college football team. The team's other statistical leaders included quarterback Steve Beuerlein (1,061 passing yards), wide receiver Joe Howard (464 receiving yards), and linebacker Tony Furjanic (142 tackles).

The team played its home games at Notre Dame Stadium in Notre Dame, Indiana.

== Schedule ==
Date	Time	Opponent	Rank	Site	TV	Result	Attendance	Source
September 10	2:30 p.m.	at Purdue	No. 5	Ross–Ade Stadium; West Lafayette, IN (rivalry)		W 52–6	69,782	
September 17	2:30 p.m.	Michigan State	No. 4	Notre Dame Stadium; Notre Dame, IN (rivalry)		L 23–28	59,075	
September 24	9:00 p.m.	at Miami (FL)	No. 13	Miami Orange Bowl; Miami, FL (rivalry)	CBS	L 0–20	52,480	
October 1	3:30 p.m.	at Colorado		Folsom Field; Boulder, CO	KWGN	W 27–3	52,692	
October 8	7:00 p.m.	at South Carolina		Williams–Brice Stadium; Columbia, SC		W 30–6	74,500	
October 15	1:00 p.m.	vs. Army		Giants Stadium; East Rutherford, NJ (rivalry)		W 42–0	75,131	
October 22	2:30 p.m.	USC		Notre Dame Stadium; Notre Dame, IN (rivalry)		W 27–6	59,075	
October 29	12:00 p.m.	Navy	No. 19	Notre Dame Stadium; Notre Dame, IN (rivalry)		W 28–12	59,075	
November 5	3:45 p.m.	Pittsburgh	No. 18	Notre Dame Stadium; Notre Dame, IN (rivalry)	CBS	L 16–21	59,075	
November 12	1:00 p.m.	at Penn State		Beaver Stadium; University Park, PA (rivalry)		L 30–34	85,899	
November 19	12:35 p.m.	Air Force		Notre Dame Stadium; Notre Dame, IN (rivalry)	ABC	L 22–23	59,075	
December 29	8:00 p.m.	vs. No. 13 Boston College		Liberty Bowl Memorial Stadium; Memphis, TN (Liberty Bowl) (rivalry)	Katz	W 19–18	47,071	
Rankings from AP Poll released prior to the game; All times are in Eastern time

== Roster ==
1983 Notre Dame Fighting Irish football team roster
Players
Coaches
Offense

Pos.	#	Name	Class
TE	82	Mark Bavaro	Jr
RB	28	Greg Bell	Sr
QB	5	Blair Kiel	Sr
RB	20	Allen Pinkett	So
G	75	Larry Williams	Jr

Defense

Pos.	#	Name	Class
CB	9	Chris Brown	Sr
DT	71	Eric Dorsey	So
LB	43	Rick DiBernardo	So
LB	58	Tony Furjanic	So
DE	78	Mike Gann	Jr
DE	55	Mike Golic	Jr
CB	30	Stacey Toran	Sr

Special teams

Pos.	#	Name	Class

Head coach

- Gerry Faust

Coordinators/assistant coaches

Legend

- (C) Team captain
- (S) Suspended
- (I) Ineligible
- Injured
- Redshirt

== Game summaries ==
=== Purdue ===
Team	1	2	3	4	Total
• Notre Dame	17	14	14	7	52
Purdue	0	0	0	6	6

- Date: September 10
- Location: Ross–Ade Stadium
- Game attendance: 69,782

Scoring summary
Q1	ND	Bell 9 yard pass from Kiel (Johnston kick)	ND 7–0
Q1	ND	Bell 1 yard run (Johnston kick)	ND 14–0
Q1	ND	Johnston 31 yard field goal	ND 17–0
Q2	ND	Bell 2 yard run (Johnston kick)	ND 24–0
Q2	ND	Bavaro 17 yard pass from Kiel (Johnston kick)	ND 31–0
Q3	ND	Pinkett 1 yard run (Johnston kick)	ND 38–0
Q3	ND	Bell 5 yard run (Johnston kick)	ND 45–0
Q4	ND	Abraham 3 yard run (Johnston kick)	ND 52–0
Q4	PUR	Brunner 18 yard pass from Everett (kick failed)	ND 52–6

- Allen Pinkett 15 Rush, 115 Yds

=== Colorado ===
Team	1	2	3	4	Total
• Notre Dame	10	7	7	3	27
Colorado	3	0	0	0	3

- Date: October 1
- Location: Folsom Field, Boulder, Colorado

Scoring summary
1	ND	Pinkett 10-yard run (Johnston kick)	ND 7-0
1	COL	Field 43-yard field goal	ND 7-3
1	ND	Johnston 21-yard field goal	ND 10-3
2	ND	Brooks 31-yard run (Johnston kick)	ND 17-3
3	ND	Smith 29-yard run (Johnston kick)	ND 24-3
4	ND	Johnston 39-yard field goal	ND 27-3

=== USC ===
Team	1	2	3	4	Total
USC	0	0	6	0	6
• Notre Dame	7	10	10	0	27

- Date: October 22
- Location: Notre Dame Stadium, South Bend, IN

Scoring summary
1		ND	Pinkett 11-yard run (Johnston kick)	ND 7-0
2		ND	Pinkett 9-yard run (Johnston kick)	ND 14-0
2	0:29	ND	Johnston 30-yard field goal	ND 17-0
3		ND	Pinkett 11-yard run (Johnston kick)	ND 24-0
3		USC	Harper 1-yard run (run failed)	ND 24-6
3	0:02	ND	Johnston 39-yard field goal	ND 27-6

The game came to be known as the "Green Jerseys II" game. Notre Dame snapped a five-game losing streak to USC as Allen Pinkett rushed 21 times for 122 yards, his fourth straight 100-yard game and the first Irish player to do so since Jim Stone in 1980. "We felt could have beat USC in blue. We felt we could have beat them in T-shirts," said Pinkett. The game took place six years to the day from the original "Green Jersey" game in 1977 but head coach Gerry Faust had already made the decision to wear the jerseys over the summer.

=== Liberty Bowl ===
Notre Dame was invited to the Liberty Bowl where they faced Boston College and their prized quarterback Doug Flutie. Boston College scored first on a 13-yard touchdown pass but missed the extra point. Notre Dame came back as Allen Pinkett and Chris Smith each rushed for 100-plus yards, while Pinkett scored two touchdowns as Notre Dame beat Boston College, 19–18, to win their first bowl game since the 1979 Cotton Bowl.

== Statistics ==
Team statistics Notre Dame gained 4,713 yards of total offense, an average of 5.9 yards per play and 428.5 yards per game. Of that total, 2,727 yards were gained by rushing, an average of 4.9 yards per carry and 238.8 yards per game. The Irish also tallied 2,086 passing yards, an average of 189.6 yard per game.

On defense, they gave up 3,154 yards of total offense (286.7 per game) by opponents, consisting of 1,473 rushing yards (133.9 per game) and 1,681 passing yards (152.8 per game).

Passing

1. Steve Beuerlein - 75-of-145 (.517) for 1,061 yards, 6 interceptions, 4 touchdowns
2. Blair Kiel - 64-of-115 (.557) for 910 yards, 7 interceptions, 7 touchdowns

Rushing

1. Allen Pinkett - 1,394 yards, 5.5-yard average, 16 touchdowns
2. Chris Smith - 421 yards, 5.5-yard average, 1 touchdown
3. Hiawatha Francisco - 194 yards, 5.1-yard average, 0 touchdowns
4. Mark Brooks - 180 yards, 5.1-yard average, 2 touchdowns
5. Greg Bell - 169 yards, 4.6-yard average, 4 touchdowns

Receiving

1. Allen Pinkett - 28 receptions for 288 yards, 10.3-yard average, 2 touchdowns
2. Joe Howard - 27 receptions, 464 yards, 17.2-yard average, 2 touchdowns
3. Milt Jackson - 23 receptions, 438 yards, 19.0-yard average, 3 touchdowns
4. Mark Bavaro - 23 receptions, 376 yards, 16.3-yard average, 3 touchdowns
5. Chris Smith - 13 receptions, 142 yards, 10.9-yard average, 1 touchdown
6. Mark Favorite - 8 receptions, 123 yards, 15.4-yard average, 0 touchdowns

Scoring

1. Allen Pinkett - 110 points on 18 touchdowns and a two-point conversion
2. Mike Johnston - 69 points, 33 of 34 PAT and 12 of 21 field goals
3. Greg Bell - 30 points, 5 touchdowns

Tackles

1. Tony Furjanic - 142 tackles
2. Rick Naylor - 71 tackles
3. Mike Kovaleski - 62 tackles
4. Mike Golic - 59 tackles (team-high 10 tackles for loss)
5. Pat Ballage - 55 tackles
6. Mike Gann - 52 tackles
7. Joe Johnson - 50 tackles

== Awards and honors ==
Allen Pinkett received first-team honors from Football News and The Sporting News on the 1983 All-America college football team. He also received second-team All-America honors from the Associated Press and United Press International. He finished 16th in voting for the Heisman Trophy.

Offensive tackle Larry Williams received second-team All-America honors from Football News.

Former Fighting Irish players Bill Fischer and Bill Shakespeare were inducted into the College Football Hall of Fame
