= 1983 Rutgers Scarlet Knights football team =

American college football season

1983 Rutgers Scarlet Knights football
- Conference: Independent
- Record: 3–8
- Head coach: Frank R. Burns (11th season)
- Offensive coordinator: Dick Curl (1st season)
- Home stadium: Rutgers Stadium; Giants Stadium

1983 Major eastern college football independents records
	Conf.					Overall
Team	W		L		T	W		L		T
Penn State	4	–	1	–	1	8	–	4	–	1
No. 16 West Virginia	4	–	2	–	0	9	–	3	–	0
No. 18 Pittsburgh	2	–	1	–	1	8	–	3	–	1
No. 19 Boston College $	3	–	2	–	0	9	–	3	–	0
Syracuse	3	–	3	–	0	6	–	5	–	0
Temple	2	–	4	–	0	4	–	7	–	0
Rutgers	0	–	5	–	0	3	–	8	–	0
$ – Lambert Trophy Winner; Rankings from AP Poll

1983 NCAA Division I-A independents football records
	Conf.					Overall
Team	W		L		T	W		L		T
No. 1 Miami (FL)		–		–		11	–	1	–	0
Virginia Tech		–		–		9	–	2	–	0
No. 19 Boston College		–		–		9	–	3	–	0
No. 16 West Virginia		–		–		9	–	3	–	0
No. 20 East Carolina		–		–		8	–	3	–	0
No. 18 Pittsburgh		–		–		8	–	3	–	1
Florida State		–		–		8	–	4	–	0
Penn State		–		–		8	–	4	–	1
Southern Miss		–		–		7	–	4	–	0
Memphis State		–		–		6	–	4	–	1
Notre Dame		–		–		7	–	5	–	0
Syracuse		–		–		6	–	5	–	0
South Carolina		–		–		5	–	6	–	0
Cincinnati			–			4	–	6	–	1
Southwestern Louisiana		–		–		4	–	6	–	0
Temple		–		–		4	–	7	–	0
Tulane		–		–		4	–	7	–	0
Louisville		–		–		3	–	8	–	0
Navy		–		–		3	–	8	–	0
Rutgers		–		–		3	–	8	–	0
Army		–		–		2	–	9	–	0
Rankings from AP Poll

The 1983 Rutgers Scarlet Knights football team represented Rutgers University as an independent during the 1983 NCAA Division I-A football season. In their 11th and final season under head coach Frank R. Burns, the Scarlet Knights compiled a 3–8 record while competing as an independent and were outscored by their opponents 258 to 195. The team's statistical leaders included Jacque LaPrarie with 1,275 passing yards, Albert Smith with 572 rushing yards, and Andrew Baker with 857 receiving yards.

== Schedule ==
Date	Opponent	Site	Result	Attendance	Source
September 10	Connecticut	Rutgers Stadium; Piscataway, NJ	W 22–5	15,283	
September 17	Boston College	Giants Stadium; East Rutherford, NJ	L 22–42	23,561	
September 24	at Syracuse	Carrier Dome; Syracuse, NY	L 13–17	26,497	
October 1	Penn State	Giants Stadium; East Rutherford, NJ	L 25–36	32,804	
October 8	at Army	Michie Stadium; West Point, NY	L 12–20	40,741	
October 15	No. 7 (I-AA) Colgate	Rutgers Stadium; Piscataway, NJ	W 29–26	21,778	
October 22	at William & Mary	Cary Field; Williamsburg, VA	W 35–28	15,000	
October 29	Tennessee	Giants Stadium; East Rutherford, NJ	L 0–7	19,201	
November 5	at Cincinnati	Riverfront Stadium; Cincinnati, OH	L 7–18	18,484	
November 12	at No. 15 West Virginia	Mountaineer Field; Morgantown, WV	L 7–35	51,317	
November 19	Temple	Rutgers Stadium; Piscataway, NJ	L 23–24	14,261	
Rankings from AP Poll released prior to the game

== Roster ==
1983 Rutgers Scarlet Knights football team roster
Players
Coaches
Offense

Pos.	#	Name	Class
QB		Eric Hochberg	So
QB		Jacque LaPrarie	Jr
OT		Harry Swayne	Fr

Defense

Pos.	#	Name	Class
CB		Carl Howard	Sr
LB		Tyronne Stowe	Fr

Special teams

Pos.	#	Name	Class

Head coach

- Frank R. Burns

Coordinators/assistant coaches

- Greg Gigantino
  (Defensive line coach)

Legend

- (C) Team captain
- (S) Suspended
- (I) Ineligible
- Injured
- Redshirt
