= 1983 Louisville Cardinals football team =

American college football season

1983 Louisville Cardinals football
- Conference: Independent
- Record: 3–8
- Head coach: Bob Weber (4th season)
- Home stadium: Cardinal Stadium

1983 NCAA Division I-A independents football records
	Conf.					Overall
Team	W		L		T	W		L		T
No. 1 Miami (FL)		–		–		11	–	1	–	0
Virginia Tech		–		–		9	–	2	–	0
No. 19 Boston College		–		–		9	–	3	–	0
No. 16 West Virginia		–		–		9	–	3	–	0
No. 20 East Carolina		–		–		8	–	3	–	0
No. 18 Pittsburgh		–		–		8	–	3	–	1
Florida State		–		–		8	–	4	–	0
Penn State		–		–		8	–	4	–	1
Southern Miss		–		–		7	–	4	–	0
Memphis State		–		–		6	–	4	–	1
Notre Dame		–		–		7	–	5	–	0
Syracuse		–		–		6	–	5	–	0
South Carolina		–		–		5	–	6	–	0
Cincinnati			–			4	–	6	–	1
Southwestern Louisiana		–		–		4	–	6	–	0
Temple		–		–		4	–	7	–	0
Tulane		–		–		4	–	7	–	0
Louisville		–		–		3	–	8	–	0
Navy		–		–		3	–	8	–	0
Rutgers		–		–		3	–	8	–	0
Army		–		–		2	–	9	–	0
Rankings from AP Poll

The 1983 Louisville Cardinals football team represented the University of Louisville in the 1983 NCAA Division I-A football season. The Cardinals, led by fourth-year head coach Bob Weber, participated as independents and played their home games at Cardinal Stadium.

== Schedule ==
Date	Opponent	Site	Result	Attendance	Source
September 3	at No. 19 SMU	Texas Stadium; Irving, TX	L 6–24	23,750	
September 10	Western Kentucky	Cardinal Stadium; Louisville, KY	W 41–22	31,279	
September 17	Army	Cardinal Stadium; Louisville, KY	W 31–7	27,454	
September 24	Cincinnati	Cardinal Stadium; Louisville, KY (rivalry)	W 31–23	23,992	
October 1	at Virginia Tech	Lane Stadium; Blacksburg, VA	L 0–31	28,300	
October 8	at No. 12 Miami (FL)	Orange Bowl; Miami, FL (rivalry)	L 14–42	30,073	
October 15	Pittsburgh	Cardinal Stadium; Louisville, KY	L 10–55	31,447	
October 20	at Florida State	Doak Campbell Stadium; Tallahassee, FL	L 7–51	42,117	
November 5	Southern Miss^{†}	Cardinal Stadium; Louisville, KY	L 3–27	17,064	
November 12	at Temple	Veterans Stadium; Philadelphia, PA	L 7–24	3,021	
November 24	Memphis State	Cardinal Stadium; Louisville, KY (rivalry)	L 7–45	9,574	
^{†}Homecoming; Rankings from AP Poll released prior to the game

== Roster ==
1983 Louisville Cardinals football team roster
Players
Coaches
Offense

Pos.	#	Name	Class
QB	5	Dean May	Sr
QB	10	Ed Rubbert	Fr
RB	27	Lamar Cummings	Jr
FB	31	Ron Davenport	Jr
OT	76	Tom Andrews	Sr
OT	77	Pete McCartney	Sr
TE	81	Bruce Armstrong	Fr

Defense

Pos.	#	Name	Class

Special teams

Pos.	#	Name	Class
DE	84	Vince Sebal	Fr

Head coach

- Bob Weber

Coordinators/assistant coaches

Legend

- (C) Team captain
- (S) Suspended
- (I) Ineligible
- Injured
- Redshirt
