= 1983 NCAA Division I-A football season =

American college football season

1983 NCAA Division I-A season
- Number of teams: 105
- Preseason AP No. 1: Nebraska

Postseason
- Duration: December 10, 1983 – January 2, 1984
- Bowl games: 16
- Heisman Trophy: Nebraska running back Mike Rozier
- Champion(s): Miami (FL) (AP, Coaches, FWAA)

Division I-A football seasons
- ← 1982 1984 →

The 1983 NCAA Division I-A football season ended with the University of Miami, led by Bernie Kosar, winning their first national championship over perennial power and top ranked Nebraska in the Orange Bowl.

The Hurricanes' 31–30 win over Nebraska has been described as one of the greatest games of all time, not only for its last minute finish, but for its role in changing the face of college football. Miami came into the game ranked No. 5, but losses by No. 2 Texas in the Cotton Bowl and No. 4 Illinois in the Rose Bowl launched them to No. 1 (despite protests from No. 3 Auburn, who played one of the most difficult schedule in the nation that year).

Nebraska scored a touchdown with 48 seconds remaining, putting them within one point of the Hurricanes. Despite knowing a tie would still give Nebraska the national title, Coach Tom Osborne decided to go for two points and the win rather than one point and the tie. Miami was able to hold, snapping Nebraska's 22-game winning streak and launching Miami as a powerhouse program.

This Miami team was the first to win a national title without a single player voted to the first team All-Americans and only the second to win a national title gaining more passing yards than rushing.

The Auburn Tigers, featuring Bo Jackson, also had a stellar season, going 11–1 and beating Michigan in the Sugar Bowl 9–7. Despite entering the bowl games ranked third in both major polls, and having both teams ranked higher losing their bowl games, the Tigers ended ranked third in the final AP poll as Miami jumped from 5th to ranked No. 1 when they beat No. 1 ranked Nebraska to gain the National Championship. Auburn had played the toughest schedule in the nation, including eight bowl teams, seven of which were ranked in the top 20 (four in the top ten). With this difficult schedule the Tigers were ranked first by a few polls, including The New York Times computer rankings. The NCAA record book also informally recognizes the Tigers as co-national champions, along with Nebraska (and Miami). It is not uncommon for the NCAA record book to "recognize" multiple national champions in a given year, with the AP and Coaches' poll winner regarded as national champions.

The Holiday Bowl was also a classic, as Brigham Young University, led by future NFL star Steve Young, defeated Missouri with a last second halfback pass.

This season's edition of the annual rivalry game between Oregon and Oregon State is still widely known and derided as "The Toilet Bowl", as the teams played to a 0–0 tie, the last scoreless tie in college football. The game featured 11 total turnovers, as 6 fumbles were lost (out of 11 total), 5 interceptions, and 4 missed field goals.

This season saw no conference have two or more teams tie for the title—an event that did not happen again in either Division I-A or its successor, Division I FBS, until 2009. (Note, however, that even when a conference officially recognizes multiple champions, it will invariably have some kind of tiebreaker system to determine placement for bowl berths.)

== Rule changes ==
These rules were published in the 1983 version of the NCAA Football Rules Book.

- The winner of the pre-game coin toss now has the option to defer their choice to the second half.
- Roughing the passer now includes an automatic first down in addition to yardage penalties.
- Running into the kicker is now a foul, with a five-yard penalty assessed.
- Unsportsmanlike conduct will be called against a kicker or punter who feigns being roughed to draw a penalty.
- Unsportsmanlike conduct will also be called for taunting a defender with the ball, spiking the ball, etc. against a player or if an entire team runs onto the field to celebrate a score.
- A two-yard buffer (halo) is established around a kick/punt returner when the ball begins its downward flight.
- Conferences are permitted to add a seventh official (side judge) to their crews. The Big Ten Conference is the first to establish seven-man crews.
- Extended the "team area" from 30-yard line to 25-yard line.
- Penalties that occur at the end of any quarter will cause the period to be extended for one un-timed down. This rule was modified in the 2023 season to only extend the period in the second and fourth quarters.
- The visiting team must wear white jerseys. This rule change mostly affected Georgia Tech and LSU, which traditionally wore white at home. It also impacted the UCLA-USC rivalry tradition of home jerseys. LSU would be allowed white jerseys at home for the 1995 season. This rule again would change to allow contrasting colors following the 2008 UCLA-USC rivalry game in which the two teams wished to restore the tradition of both teams wearing home jerseys.

== Conference and program changes ==
- Admitted as a non-football member of the Atlantic Coast Conference in 1979, Georgia Tech played its first season of ACC football in 1983 after 19 seasons as an independent.
- The Mid-American Conference is promoted back into Division I-A after a 1 year relegation.
- Cincinnati is relegated to the FCS, just to become the first FCS team to upset a ranked FBS opponent and then rejoin the FBS next season.

School	1982 Conference	1983 Conference
Georgia Tech Yellow Jackets	I-A Independent	ACC
Cincinnati Bearcats	I-A Independent	I-AA Independent

== September ==
Big 8 rivals Nebraska and Oklahoma were No. 1 and No. 2 in the preseason AP Poll, followed by No. 3 Texas. Defending champion Penn State was No. 4, and Auburn was No. 5.

In the kickoff classic on August 29, No. 1 Nebraska routed No. 4 Penn State, 44–6. The Nittany Lions opened with three straight losses and never made it back into the polls. None of the other top–ranked teams played in the first week of September, and the next poll featured No. 1 Nebraska, No. 2 Oklahoma, No. 3 Texas, No. 4 Auburn, and No. 5 Notre Dame.

September 10: No. 1 Nebraska beat Wyoming 56–20, and No. 2 Oklahoma won 27–14 at Stanford. No. 3 Texas still had not started its schedule. No. 4 Auburn defeated Southern Mississippi 24–3, and No. 5 Notre Dame won 52–6 at Purdue. The latter two teams switched places in the next poll: No. 1 Nebraska, No. 2 Oklahoma, No. 3 Texas, No. 4 Notre Dame, and No. 5 Auburn.

September 17: No. 1 Nebraska annihilated Minnesota 84–13, setting a school scoring record against a Division I opponent. Otherwise, this was a day of shakeup in the top five. No. 2 Oklahoma lost at home to No. 6 Ohio State, 24–12. No. 3 Texas won at No. 4 Auburn 20–7. No. 5 Notre Dame lost at home to Michigan State, 28–23. Moving up in the next poll were No. 7 Arizona, which beat Washington State 45–6 (the Wildcats had outscored their first three opponents 133–12) and No. 10 North Carolina, which defeated Miami–Ohio 48–17. The poll featured No. 1 Nebraska, No. 2 Texas, No. 3 Ohio State, No. 4 Arizona, and No. 5 North Carolina.

September 24: No. 1 Nebraska defeated UCLA 42–10, and No. 2 Texas beat North Texas State 26–6. No. 3 Ohio State lost at No. 7 Iowa 20–14, while No. 4 Arizona won 27–10 over Cal State Fullerton and No. 5 North Carolina beat William & Mary 51–20. The next poll featured No. 1 Nebraska, No. 2 Texas, No. 3 Arizona, No. 4 Iowa, and No. 5 North Carolina.

== October ==
October 1: No. 1 Nebraska blew out Syracuse 63–7, and No. 2 Texas defeated Rice 42–6. However, No. 3 Arizona was tied by California 33–33; No. 4 Iowa had the same level of defense but none of the offense, being shut out 33–0 by Illinois. No. 5 North Carolina won 38–21 at Georgia Tech, which was beginning its first year in the ACC. Moving up were No. 6 Alabama, which had started 4–0 in their first year without Bear Bryant (the most recent win being 44–13 over Memphis) and No. 7 West Virginia, which edged Pittsburgh 24–21. The poll featured No. 1 Nebraska, No. 2 Texas, No. 3 Alabama, No. 4 North Carolina, and No. 5 West Virginia.

October 8: No. 1 Nebraska finally ran into trouble, being taken down to the wire in their Big 8 opener against Oklahoma State. The Cornhuskers pulled out a 14–10 win with an interception in the end zone on the game’s final play. No. 2 Texas matched up with Nebraska’s conference rival, No. 8 Oklahoma, and won 28–16. No. 3 Alabama lost at Penn State, 34–28. No. 4 North Carolina beat Wake Forest 30–10, No. 5 West Virginia was idle, and No. 7 Auburn won 49–21 at Kentucky. The next poll featured No. 1 Nebraska, No. 2 Texas, No. 3 North Carolina, No. 4 West Virginia, and No. 5 Auburn.

October 15: No. 1 Nebraska breathed a little easier with a 34–13 win at Missouri. No. 2 Texas beat Arkansas 31–3, No. 3 North Carolina won 42–14 at North Carolina State, No. 4 West Virginia shut out Virginia Tech 13–0, and No. 5 Auburn defeated Georgia Tech 31–13. The top five remained the same.

October 22: No. 1 Nebraska led by just two points at the half but exploded after the break, scoring 48 third quarter points in a 69–19 rout of Colorado. No. 2 Texas beat No. 9 SMU 15–12, ending a 21–game unbeaten streak for the Mustangs. No. 3 North Carolina was idle. No. 4 West Virginia lost 41–23 at Penn State. No. 5 Auburn defeated Mississippi State 28–13, and No. 6 Florida won 24–17 over East Carolina. The next poll featured No. 1 Nebraska, No. 2 Texas, No. 3 North Carolina, No. 4 Auburn, and No. 5 Florida.

October 29: No. 1 Nebraska won 51–25 at Kansas State, and No. 2 Texas defeated Texas Tech 20–3. No. 3 North Carolina started a three–game losing streak by falling to No. 13 Maryland 28–26. No. 4 Auburn beat No. 5 Florida 28–21. Another SEC team, No. 6 Georgia, won 31–14 over Temple, while No. 7 Miami (which had won eight straight games by double digits after a season opening loss to Florida) beat No. 12 West Virginia 20–3. The new top five was No. 1 Nebraska, No. 2 Texas, No. 3 Auburn, No. 4 Georgia, and No. 5 Miami.

== November ==
November 5: No. 1 Nebraska put on another offensive clinic, winning 72–29 over Iowa State; Mike Rozier rushed for four touchdowns to set a new Big 8 record for TDs in a season. Meanwhile, No. 2 Texas was held without a touchdown but still beat Houston 9–3. No. 3 Auburn defeated No. 7 Maryland 35–23. No. 4 Georgia visited No. 9 Florida and dealt the Gators their second straight close loss, 10–9. No. 5 Miami needed a late touchdown to beat East Carolina 12–7; they were passed in the next poll by No. 6 Illinois, which won 50–23 at Minnesota. The top five were No. 1 Nebraska, No. 2 Texas, No. 3 Auburn, No. 4 Georgia, and No. 5 Illinois.

November 12: No. 1 Nebraska posted their fourth consecutive 50+ point performance, defeating Kansas 67–13. No. 2 Texas beat TCU 20–14. In a battle for first place in the SEC, No. 3 Auburn pulled out a 13–7 win over No. 4 Georgia, the Bulldogs’ first conference loss in four years. No. 5 Illinois beat Indiana 49–21 to clinch a surprise Big Ten title and Rose Bowl berth. No. 6 Miami finished its schedule with a 17–16 win at Florida State on a late field goal. The next poll featured No. 1 Nebraska, No. 2 Texas, No. 3 Auburn, No. 4 Illinois, and No. 5 Miami.

November 19: No. 1 Nebraska and No. 3 Auburn were idle. No. 2 Texas clinched the SWC title and a Cotton Bowl berth with a 24–21 win over Baylor. No. 4 Illinois finished its schedule by defeating Northwestern 56–24. The Illini’s Rose Bowl opponent would be UCLA, which earned the Pac-10 title with a 27–17 victory at USC. (In less dignified Pac–10 action, this was also the day of “The Toilet Bowl”, a 0–0 tie between Oregon and Oregon State which is regarded as one of the worst–played football games of all time.) No. 5 Miami had finished its season, and the top five remained the same.

November 26: Despite the season–long dominance of No. 1 Nebraska, unranked Oklahoma only had one conference loss and could still gain an Orange Bowl berth by defeating the Cornhuskers. Trailing by only seven points with under a minute left, the Sooners got as far as the Nebraska 1–yard line before a Cornhuskers defensive stand preserved a 28–21 victory. No. 2 Texas had an easier time, winning 45–13 at Texas A&M. No. 3 Auburn was again idle, and the top five remained the same.

== December ==
December 3: Similar to Nebraska’s situation the previous week, No. 3 Auburn was undefeated in SEC play but No. 19 Alabama could keep their rivals out of the Sugar Bowl with a victory in their game against each other. The Tigers prevailed 23-20 in a torrential rainstorm, with the key play being a 71-yard touchdown run by Bo Jackson. All of the other highly-ranked teams had finished their seasons, and the top five was the same as the past few weeks: No. 1 Nebraska, No. 2 Texas, No. 3 Auburn, No. 4 Illinois, and No. 5 Miami.

Because the winners of major conferences were tied to specific bowls, none of the top four teams were able to play each other in the postseason. The highest-ranked matchup would be No. 1 Nebraska against No. 5 Miami in the Orange Bowl. No. 7 Georgia and No. 8 Michigan, the runners-up in the SEC and Big Ten, would respectively play No. 2 Texas in the Cotton Bowl and No. 3 Auburn in the Sugar Bowl. As always, the Rose Bowl would feature the winners of the Big Ten and Pac-10, No. 4 Illinois and unranked UCLA.

== Conference standings ==
1983 Atlantic Coast Conference football standings
	Conf.					Overall
Team	W		L		T	W		L		T
Maryland $	5	–	0	–	0	8	–	4	–	0
North Carolina	4	–	2	–	0	8	–	4	–	0
Georgia Tech	3	–	2	–	0	3	–	8	–	0
Virginia	3	–	3	–	0	6	–	5	–	0
Duke	3	–	3	–	0	3	–	8	–	0
Wake Forest	1	–	5	–	0	4	–	7	–	0
NC State	1	–	5	–	0	3	–	8	–	0
No. 11 Clemson *	0	–	0	–	0	9	–	1	–	1
$ – Conference champion; * – Clemson was under NCAA and ACC probation and was ineligible for the ACC title. As a result, their ACC games did not count in the league standings.; Rankings from AP Poll

1983 Big Eight Conference football standings
	Conf.					Overall
Team	W		L		T	W		L		T
No. 2 Nebraska $	7	–	0	–	0	12	–	1	–	0
Missouri	5	–	2	–	0	7	–	5	–	0
Oklahoma	5	–	2	–	0	8	–	4	–	0
Oklahoma State	3	–	4	–	0	8	–	4	–	0
Iowa State	3	–	4	–	0	4	–	7	–	0
Kansas	2	–	5	–	0	4	–	6	–	1
Colorado	2	–	5	–	0	4	–	7	–	0
Kansas State	1	–	6	–	0	3	–	8	–	0
$ – Conference champion; Rankings from AP Poll

1983 Big Ten Conference football standings
	Conf.					Overall
Team	W		L		T	W		L		T
No. 10 Illinois $	9	–	0	–	0	10	–	2	–	0
No. 8 Michigan	8	–	1	–	0	9	–	3	–	0
No. 14 Iowa	7	–	2	–	0	9	–	3	–	0
No. 9 Ohio State	6	–	3	–	0	9	–	3	–	0
Wisconsin	5	–	4	–	0	7	–	4	–	0
Purdue	3	–	5	–	1	3	–	7	–	1
Michigan State	2	–	6	–	1	4	–	6	–	1
Indiana	2	–	7	–	0	3	–	8	–	0
Northwestern	2	–	7	–	0	2	–	9	–	0
Minnesota	0	–	9	–	0	1	–	10	–	0
$ – Conference champion; Rankings from AP Poll

1983 Mid-American Conference football standings
	Conf.					Overall
Team	W		L		T	W		L		T
Northern Illinois $	8	–	1	–	0	10	–	2	–	0
Toledo	7	–	2	–	0	9	–	2	–	0
Bowling Green	7	–	2	–	0	8	–	3	–	0
Central Michigan	7	–	2	–	0	8	–	3	–	0
Ball State	4	–	4	–	0	6	–	5	–	0
Western Michigan	4	–	5	–	0	6	–	5	–	0
Miami (OH)	3	–	5	–	0	4	–	7	–	0
Ohio	3	–	6	–	0	4	–	7	–	0
Kent State	1	–	8	–	0	1	–	10	–	0
Eastern Michigan	0	–	9	–	0	1	–	10	–	0
$ – Conference champion

1983 Missouri Valley Conference football standings
	Conf.					Overall
Team	W		L		T	W		L		T
Tulsa $	5	–	0	–	0	8	–	3	–	0
No. 1 Southern Illinois ^	4	–	1	–	0	13	–	1	–	0
No. 5 Indiana State ^	3	–	2	–	0	9	–	4	–	0
New Mexico State	3	–	2	–	0	5	–	6	–	0
Illinois State	2	–	2	–	1	6	–	4	–	1
Wichita State	3	–	3	–	0	3	–	8	–	0
Drake	1	–	6	–	0	1	–	10	–	0
West Texas State	0	–	5	–	1	0	–	10	–	1
$ – Conference champion; ^ – NCAA Division I-AA playoff participant; The conference was a hybrid of NCAA Division I-A and I-AA programs. New Mexico State, Tulsa, and Wichita State were I-A and the other teams were I-AA.; Rankings from NCAA Division I-AA Football Committee poll

1983 Pacific Coast Athletic Association football standings
	Conf.					Overall
Team	W		L		T	W		L		T
Cal State Fullerton $	6	–	0	–	0	8	–	4	–	0
Utah State	4	–	2	–	0	6	–	5	–	0
Long Beach State	3	–	3	–	0	8	–	4	–	0
Fresno State	3	–	3	–	0	7	–	4	–	0
San Jose State	3	–	3	–	0	5	–	6	–	0
Pacific (CA)	2	–	4	–	0	4	–	8	–	0
UNLV	0	–	6	–	0	0	–	11	–	0
$ – Conference champion; Records adjusted for UNLV's forfeit of all 7 victories

1983 Pacific-10 Conference football standings
	Conf.					Overall
Team	W		L		T	W		L		T
No. 17 UCLA $	6	–	1	–	1	7	–	4	–	1
Washington	5	–	2	–	0	8	–	4	–	0
Washington State	5	–	3	–	0	7	–	4	–	0
USC	4	–	3	–	0	4	–	6	–	1
Arizona	4	–	3	–	1	7	–	3	–	1
Arizona State	3	–	3	–	1	6	–	4	–	1
Oregon	3	–	3	–	1	4	–	6	–	1
California	3	–	4	–	1	5	–	5	–	1
Oregon State	1	–	6	–	1	3	–	7	–	1
Stanford	1	–	7	–	0	1	–	10	–	0
$ – Conference champion; Rankings from AP Poll

1983 Southeastern Conference football standings
	Conf.					Overall
Team	W		L		T	W		L		T
No. 3 Auburn $	6	–	0	–	0	11	–	1	–	0
No. 4 Georgia	5	–	1	–	0	10	–	1	–	1
No. 6 Florida	4	–	2	–	0	9	–	2	–	1
Tennessee	4	–	2	–	0	9	–	3	–	0
No. 15 Alabama	4	–	2	–	0	8	–	4	–	0
Ole Miss	4	–	2	–	0	6	–	6	–	0
Kentucky	2	–	4	–	0	6	–	5	–	1
Mississippi State	1	–	5	–	0	3	–	8	–	0
LSU	0	–	6	–	0	4	–	7	–	0
Vanderbilt	0	–	6	–	0	2	–	9	–	0
$ – Conference champion; Rankings from AP Poll

1983 Southwest Conference football standings
	Conf.					Overall
Team	W		L		T	W		L		T
No. 5 Texas $	8	–	0	–	0	11	–	1	–	0
No. 12 SMU	7	–	1	–	0	10	–	2	–	0
Baylor	4	–	3	–	1	7	–	4	–	1
Texas A&M	4	–	3	–	1	5	–	5	–	1
Arkansas	4	–	4	–	0	6	–	5	–	0
Texas Tech	3	–	4	–	1	3	–	7	–	1
Houston	3	–	5	–	0	4	–	7	–	0
TCU	1	–	6	–	1	1	–	8	–	2
Rice	0	–	8	–	0	1	–	10	–	0
$ – Conference champion; Rankings from AP Poll

1983 Western Athletic Conference football standings
	Conf.					Overall
Team	W		L		T	W		L		T
No. 7 BYU $	7	–	0	–	0	11	–	1	–	0
No. 13 Air Force	5	–	2	–	0	10	–	2	–	0
Wyoming	5	–	3	–	0	7	–	5	–	0
New Mexico	4	–	3	–	0	6	–	6	–	0
Hawaii	3	–	3	–	1	5	–	5	–	1
Utah	4	–	4	–	0	5	–	6	–	0
Colorado State	4	–	4	–	0	5	–	7	–	0
San Diego State	1	–	6	–	1	2	–	9	–	1
UTEP	0	–	8	–	0	2	–	10	–	0
$ – Conference champion; Rankings from AP Poll

1983 NCAA Division I-A independents football records
	Conf.					Overall
Team	W		L		T	W		L		T
No. 1 Miami (FL)		–		–		11	–	1	–	0
Virginia Tech		–		–		9	–	2	–	0
No. 19 Boston College		–		–		9	–	3	–	0
No. 16 West Virginia		–		–		9	–	3	–	0
No. 20 East Carolina		–		–		8	–	3	–	0
No. 18 Pittsburgh		–		–		8	–	3	–	1
Florida State		–		–		8	–	4	–	0
Penn State		–		–		8	–	4	–	1
Southern Miss		–		–		7	–	4	–	0
Memphis State		–		–		6	–	4	–	1
Notre Dame		–		–		7	–	5	–	0
Syracuse		–		–		6	–	5	–	0
South Carolina		–		–		5	–	6	–	0
Cincinnati			–			4	–	6	–	1
Southwestern Louisiana		–		–		4	–	6	–	0
Temple		–		–		4	–	7	–	0
Tulane		–		–		4	–	7	–	0
Louisville		–		–		3	–	8	–	0
Navy		–		–		3	–	8	–	0
Rutgers		–		–		3	–	8	–	0
Army		–		–		2	–	9	–	0
Rankings from AP Poll

== AP final poll ==
1. Miami (FL)
2. Nebraska
3. Auburn
4. Georgia
5. Texas
6. Florida
7. Brigham Young
8. Michigan
9. Ohio State
10. Illinois
11. Clemson
12. SMU
13. Air Force
14. Iowa
15. Alabama
16. West Virginia
17. UCLA
18. Pittsburgh
19. Boston College
20. East Carolina

== Final coaches poll ==
1. Miami (FL)
2. Nebraska
3. Auburn
4. Georgia
5. Texas
6. Florida
7. Brigham Young
8. Ohio St.
9. Michigan
10. Illinois
11. Southern Methodist
12. Alabama
13. UCLA
14. Iowa
15. Air Force
16. West Virginia
17. Penn St.
18. Oklahoma St.
19. Pittsburgh
20. Boston College

== Notable rivalry games ==
- Arizona 17, Arizona State 15
- Auburn 23, Alabama 20
- Florida 53, Florida State 15
- Florida 28, Miami 3
- Georgia 10, Florida 9
- Georgia 27, Georgia Tech 24
- Iowa 51, Iowa State 10
- Kansas 37, Missouri 27
- Kansas 31, Kansas State 3
- LSU 20, Tulane 7
- Miami 17, Florida State 16
- Michigan 24, Ohio State 21
- Michigan 42, Michigan State 0
- Ole Miss 24, Mississippi State 23 (The "Immaculate Deflection"—a game-winning 26-yard field goal attempt by the Bulldogs' Arite Cosby was captured by a strong gust of wind and blown straight down to the ground five yards short of the goalpost, allowing the Rebels to win the Egg Bowl and qualify for a bowl game)
- Navy 42, Army 13 (played at the Rose Bowl, the only time the Army-Navy Game has been played west of the Mississippi River)
- Nebraska 28, Oklahoma 21
- Notre Dame 27, USC 6
- Oklahoma 21, Oklahoma State 20
- Oregon 0, Oregon State 0 (Known as The Toilet Bowl, the last time an NCAA Division I-A game ended in a scoreless tie.)
- Texas 28, Oklahoma 16
- Texas 45, Texas A&M 13
- UCLA 27, USC 17
- Washington State 17, Washington 6
- Wisconsin 56, Minnesota 17
- California 27, Stanford 18

== I-AA team wins over I-A teams ==
Italics denotes I-AA teams.

Date	Visiting team	Home team	Site	Result	Attendance	Ref.
September 3	Kent State	Akron	Rubber Bowl • Akron, Ohio (Wagon Wheel)	6–13	37,111	
September 3	Appalachian State	Wake Forest	Groves Stadium • Winston-Salem, North Carolina	27–25	25,711	
September 10	Akron	Eastern Michigan	Rynearson Stadium • Ypsilanti, Michigan	13–0	5,173	
September 10	Colgate	Army	Michie Stadium • West Point, New York	15–13	33,285	
September 10	Cincinnati	No. 20 (I-A) Penn State	Beaver Stadium • University Park, Pennsylvania	14–3	83,683	
September 10	Idaho State	UTEP	Sun Bowl • El Paso, Texas	12–10	20,193	
September 10	Southwestern Louisiana	Northeast Louisiana	Malone Stadium • Monroe, Louisiana (Battle on the Bayou)	6–31	20,451	
September 17	Chattanooga	Southwestern Louisiana	Cajun Field • Lafayette, Louisiana	38–14	20,157	
September 17	Delaware	William & Mary	Cary Field • Williamsburg, Virginia (rivalry)	30–17	13,440	
September 17	Furman	Georgia Tech	Grant Field • Atlanta, Georgia	17–14	24,311	
October 1	Army	Harvard	Harvard Stadium • Boston, Massachusetts	21–24	15,000	
October 1	No. 16 (I-AA) North Texas State	New Mexico	University Stadium • Albuquerque, New Mexico	18–8	21,048	
October 8	Ball State	No. 18 (I-AA) Indiana State	Memorial Stadium • Terre Haute, Indiana (Blue Key Victory Bell)	14–35	9,219	
October 8	Boston University	Richmond	University of Richmond Stadium • Richmond, Virginia	26–17	7,110	
October 8	Wichita State	UT Arlington	Maverick Stadium • Arlington, Texas	34–24	5,187	
October 15	Wichita State	Indiana State	Memorial Stadium • Terre Haute, Indiana	22–24	8,782	
October 22	Lehigh	Army	Michie Stadium • West Point, New York	13–12	41,000	
October 29	Long Beach State	Eastern Washington	Joe Albi Stadium • Spokane, Washington	17–20	2,200	
October 29	No. 19 (I-AA) Idaho	Pacific (CA)	Pacific Memorial Stadium • Stockton, California	19–31	11,500	
October 29	Cal State Fullerton	No. 15 (I-AA) Idaho State	ASISU Minidome • Pocatello, Idaho	10–43	8,215	
November 5	Pacific (CA)	Nevada	Mackay Stadium • Reno, Nevada	24–34	8,174	
November 12	Richmond	No. 15 (I-AA) Colgate	Andy Kerr Stadium • Hamilton, New York	14–43	4,000	
^{#}Rankings from AP Poll released prior to game.

- Note:
  - Cincinnati at Kentucky tied 13–13.
  - Arkansas State at Memphis State tied 14–14.

== No. 1 and No. 2 Progress ==
In the AP preseason poll released on August 27, Big 8 Conference rivals Nebraska and Oklahoma were No. 1 and No. 2. After the Oklahoma Sooners lost 24–14 to Ohio State on September 17, the Nebraska Cornhuskers remained No. 1 and were trailed for nearly the entire season by Texas. Nebraska received all 60 of the first place votes in the polls of September 26 and October 3, and no fewer than 51 as the season continued, while the Longhorns never received more than five votes during the same period. Meanwhile, the University of Miami Hurricanes, unranked in the preseason Top 20, began winning after their first week 28–3 loss to Florida. Miami came in at No. 15 in the September 26 poll. As they continued unbeaten, the Hurricanes gathered force, rising to No. 12, No. 10, No. 8, No. 7, and reached No. 5 by October 31, where they remained in the final regular season poll after they were invited to play against Nebraska in the Orange Bowl.

== Bowl games ==
January 2 Bowls:

- Rose Bowl: UCLA 45, No. 4 Illinois 9
- Sugar Bowl: No. 3 Auburn 9, No. 8 Michigan 7
- Orange Bowl: No. 5 Miami (Fl) 31, No. 1 Nebraska 30
- Cotton Bowl: No. 7 Georgia 10, No. 2 Texas 9
- Fiesta Bowl: No. 14 Ohio State 28, No. 15 Pittsburgh 23

Other Bowls:

- Florida Citrus Bowl: Tennessee 30, No. 17 Maryland 23
- Gator Bowl: No. 11 Florida 14, No. 10 Iowa 6
- Holiday Bowl: No. 9 Brigham Young 21, Missouri 17
- Peach Bowl: Florida State 28, North Carolina 3
- Sun Bowl: Alabama 28, No. 6 SMU 7
- Independence Bowl: No. 16 Air Force 9, Ole Miss 3
- Liberty Bowl: Notre Dame 19, No. 13 Boston College 18
- Aloha Bowl: Penn State 13, Washington 10
- Bluebonnet Bowl Oklahoma State 24, No. 20 Baylor 14
- Hall of Fame Classic: No. 18 West Virginia 20, Kentucky 16
- California Bowl: Northern Illinois 20, CSU-Fullerton 13

== Heisman Trophy voting ==
The Heisman Trophy is given to the year's most outstanding player

Player	School	Position	1st	2nd	3rd	Total
Mike Rozier	Nebraska	RB	482	154	47	1,801
Steve Young	BYU	QB	153	312	89	1,172
Doug Flutie	Boston College	QB	23	38	108	253
Turner Gill	Nebraska	QB	11	41	75	190
Terry Hoage	Georgia	S	7	25	41	112
Napoleon McCallum	Navy	RB	6	18	50	104
Jeff Hostetler	West Virginia	QB	5	17	22	71
Bill Fralic	Pittsburgh	OT	6	10	28	66
Walter Lewis	Alabama	QB	4	13	16	54
Boomer Esiason	Maryland	QB	4	11	17	51

== Other annual awards ==
- Maxwell Award (College Player of the Year) – Mike Rozier, Nebraska
- Walter Camp Award (Back) – Mike Rozier, Nebraska
- Davey O'Brien Award (Quarterback) – Steve Young, Brigham Young
- Lombardi Award (Lineman or Linebacker) – Dean Steinkuhler, Nebraska
- Outland Trophy (Interior Lineman) – Dean Steinkuhler, Offensive tackle, Nebraska
- Paul "Bear" Bryant Award – Howard Schnellenberger, Miami

== Attendances ==
Average home attendance top 3:

Rank	Team	Average
1	Michigan Wolverines	104,486
2	Ohio State Buckeyes	89,018
3	Tennessee Volunteers	84,928
