= John McVeigh (linebacker) =

American football player (born 1962)

No. 53
- Position: Linebacker

Personal information
- Born: October 19, 1962 (age 64)
- Listed height: 6 ft 1 in (1.85 m)
- Listed weight: 226 lb (103 kg)

Career information
- High school: Christopher Columbus (Miami, Florida)
- College: Kentucky (1981–1982); Miami (1983–1985)
- NFL draft: 1986: 12th round, 321st overall pick

Career history
- Seattle Seahawks (1986)*; Seattle Seahawks (1987)
- * Offseason or practice squad member only

Awards and highlights
- National champion (1983)

Career NFL statistics
- Games played: 3
- Games started: 3
- Tackles: 24
- Stats at Pro Football Reference

John Bosco McVeigh (born October 19, 1962) is an American former professional football linebacker who played in the National Football League (NFL) with the Seattle Seahawks. He played college football for the Kentucky Wildcats and Miami Hurricanes.

== Early life ==
McVeigh was born on October 19, 1962, and attended Christopher Columbus High School in Miami, Florida. He lettered in baseball, basketball and football.

== College career ==
McVeigh played college football for the Kentucky Wildcats from 1981 to 1982 and Miami Hurricanes from 1983 to 1985. He played two seasons at Kentucky on the defensive line before transferring to the University of Miami after the 1982 season. As a senior, McVeigh had 73 tackles, six sacks, two forced fumbles and fumble recovery as a linebacker.

== Professional career ==
McVeigh was selected in the 12th round, with the 321st overall selection, by the Seattle Seahawks in the 1986 NFL draft. On July 16, he signed his rookie contract with the team. On August 26, McVeigh was released. On September 29, 1987, he was re-signed by the Seahawks as a replacement player during the NFLPA strike. McVeigh started all three strike games, recording 24 tackles. On October 20, he was released after the strike ended.
