= 1983 Boston College Eagles football team =

American college football season

1983 Boston College Eagles football

Eastern champion

Liberty Bowl, L 18–19 vs. Notre Dame
- Conference: Independent

Ranking
- Coaches: No. 20
- AP: No. 19
- Record: 9–3
- Head coach: Jack Bicknell (3rd season)
- Defensive coordinator: Seymour "Red" Kelin (3rd season)
- Captains: Bob Biestek; Brian Brennan; Steve DeOssie
- Home stadium: Alumni Stadium; Sullivan Stadium

1983 Major eastern college football independents records
	Conf.					Overall
Team	W		L		T	W		L		T
Penn State	4	–	1	–	1	8	–	4	–	1
No. 16 West Virginia	4	–	2	–	0	9	–	3	–	0
No. 18 Pittsburgh	2	–	1	–	1	8	–	3	–	1
No. 19 Boston College $	3	–	2	–	0	9	–	3	–	0
Syracuse	3	–	3	–	0	6	–	5	–	0
Temple	2	–	4	–	0	4	–	7	–	0
Rutgers	0	–	5	–	0	3	–	8	–	0
$ – Lambert Trophy Winner; Rankings from AP Poll

1983 NCAA Division I-A independents football records
	Conf.					Overall
Team	W		L		T	W		L		T
No. 1 Miami (FL)		–		–		11	–	1	–	0
Virginia Tech		–		–		9	–	2	–	0
No. 19 Boston College		–		–		9	–	3	–	0
No. 16 West Virginia		–		–		9	–	3	–	0
No. 20 East Carolina		–		–		8	–	3	–	0
No. 18 Pittsburgh		–		–		8	–	3	–	1
Florida State		–		–		8	–	4	–	0
Penn State		–		–		8	–	4	–	1
Southern Miss		–		–		7	–	4	–	0
Memphis State		–		–		6	–	4	–	1
Notre Dame		–		–		7	–	5	–	0
Syracuse		–		–		6	–	5	–	0
South Carolina		–		–		5	–	6	–	0
Cincinnati			–			4	–	6	–	1
Southwestern Louisiana		–		–		4	–	6	–	0
Temple		–		–		4	–	7	–	0
Tulane		–		–		4	–	7	–	0
Louisville		–		–		3	–	8	–	0
Navy		–		–		3	–	8	–	0
Rutgers		–		–		3	–	8	–	0
Army		–		–		2	–	9	–	0
Rankings from AP Poll

The 1983 Boston College Eagles football team represented Boston College as an independent during the 1983 NCAA Division I-A football season. The Eagles were led by third-year head coach Jack Bicknell, and played their home games at Alumni Stadium in Chestnut Hill, Massachusetts and Sullivan Stadium (later known as Foxboro Stadium) in Foxborough, Massachusetts. Junior quarterback Doug Flutie threw for over 2,700 yards and finished third in the Heisman Trophy voting, leading Boston College to their first ranked finish in 41 years. They met their rivals, Notre Dame, in the 1983 Liberty Bowl.

Boston College finished the season ranked No. 19 in the final AP Poll, and captured the Lambert-Meadowlands Trophy (emblematic of the 'Eastern championship' in Division I FBS).

== Schedule ==
Date	Opponent	Rank	Site	TV	Result	Attendance	Source
September 3	Morgan State		Alumni Stadium; Chestnut Hill, MA		W 45–12	31,300	
September 10	Clemson		Alumni Stadium; Chestnut Hill, MA (rivalry)		W 31–16	32,000–32,500	
September 17	at Rutgers		Giants Stadium; East Rutherford, NJ		W 42–22	23,561	
September 24	No. 12 West Virginia	No. 19	Alumni Stadium; Chestnut Hill, MA	ABC	L 17–27	32,000	
October 1	at Temple		Franklin Field; Philadelphia, PA		W 18–15	7,033	
October 8	at Yale		Yale Bowl; New Haven, CT		W 42–7	31,108	
October 29	Penn State	No. 19	Sullivan Stadium; Foxborough, MA	ABC	W 27–17	56,605	
November 5	at Army	No. 16	Michie Stadium; West Point, NY		W 34–14	40,749	
November 12	at Syracuse	No. 13	Carrier Dome; Syracuse, NY		L 10–21	41,225	
November 19	vs. Holy Cross	No. 18	Sullivan Stadium; Foxborough, MA (rivalry)	ABC	W 47–7	38,512	
November 25	No. 13 Alabama	No. 15	Sullivan Stadium; Foxborough, MA	CBS	W 20–13	58,047	
December 29	vs. Notre Dame	No. 13	Liberty Bowl Memorial Stadium; Memphis, TN (Liberty Bowl, Holy War)		L 18–19	47,071	
Rankings from AP Poll released prior to the game

== Roster ==
1983 Boston College Eagles football team roster
Players
Coaches
Offense

Pos.	#	Name	Class
WR	13	Brian Brennan	Sr
RB	32	Jim Browne	Jr
QB	22	Doug Flutie	Jr
OL	79	Mark MacDonald	Jr
WR	20	Gerard Phelan	Jr
RB	23	Troy Stradford	Fr
WR	3	Chris Tripucka	Jr
C		Darren Twombly	Fr

Defense

Pos.	#	Name	Class
NG	68	Mike Ruth	So
LB	81	Andy Hemmer	So
DB	17	Tony Thurman	Jr

Special teams

Pos.	#	Name	Class

Head coach

- Jack Bicknell

Coordinators/assistant coaches

- Tom Coughlin – Quarterbacks

Legend

- (C) Team captain
- (S) Suspended
- (I) Ineligible
- Injured
- Redshirt
