= 1983 East Carolina Pirates football team =

American college football season

1983 East Carolina Pirates football
- Conference: Independent

Ranking
- AP: No. 20
- Record: 8–3
- Head coach: Ed Emory (4th season)
- Defensive coordinator: Tom Throckmorton (1st season)
- Home stadium: Ficklen Memorial Stadium

1983 NCAA Division I-A independents football records
	Conf.					Overall
Team	W		L		T	W		L		T
No. 1 Miami (FL)		–		–		11	–	1	–	0
Virginia Tech		–		–		9	–	2	–	0
No. 19 Boston College		–		–		9	–	3	–	0
No. 16 West Virginia		–		–		9	–	3	–	0
No. 20 East Carolina		–		–		8	–	3	–	0
No. 18 Pittsburgh		–		–		8	–	3	–	1
Florida State		–		–		8	–	4	–	0
Penn State		–		–		8	–	4	–	1
Southern Miss		–		–		7	–	4	–	0
Memphis State		–		–		6	–	4	–	1
Notre Dame		–		–		7	–	5	–	0
Syracuse		–		–		6	–	5	–	0
South Carolina		–		–		5	–	6	–	0
Cincinnati			–			4	–	6	–	1
Southwestern Louisiana		–		–		4	–	6	–	0
Temple		–		–		4	–	7	–	0
Tulane		–		–		4	–	7	–	0
Louisville		–		–		3	–	8	–	0
Navy		–		–		3	–	8	–	0
Rutgers		–		–		3	–	8	–	0
Army		–		–		2	–	9	–	0
Rankings from AP Poll

The 1983 East Carolina Pirates football team was an American football team that represented East Carolina University as an independent during the 1983 NCAA Division I-A football season. In their fourth season under head coach Ed Emory, the team compiled a 8–3 record.

== Schedule ==
Date	Opponent	Site	TV	Result	Attendance	Source
September 3	at No. 7 Florida State	Doak Campbell Stadium; Tallahassee, FL	WITN	L 46–47	46,261	
September 10	at NC State	Carter–Finley Stadium; Raleigh, NC (rivalry)	TBS	W 22–16	57,700	
September 17	Murray State	Ficklen Memorial Stadium; Greenville, NC		W 50–25	28,123	
October 1	at Missouri	Faurot Field; Columbia, MO		W 13–6	48,268	
October 8	Southwestern Louisiana	Ficklen Memorial Stadium; Greenville, NC		W 21–18	27,345	
October 15	at Temple	Franklin Field; Philadelphia, PA		W 24–11	5,461	
October 22	at No. 6 Florida	Florida Field; Gainesville, FL		L 17–24	73,943	
October 29	East Tennessee State	Ficklen Memorial Stadium; Greenville, NC		W 21–9	33,767	
November 5	at No. 5 Miami (FL)	Miami Orange Bowl; Miami, FL		L 7–12	39,255	
November 12	William & Mary	Ficklen Memorial Stadium; Greenville, NC		W 40–6	24,731	
November 19	at Southern Miss	M. M. Roberts Stadium; Hattiesburg, MS		W 10–6	21,000	
Rankings from AP Poll released prior to the game
