= 1983 Florida State Seminoles football team =

American college football season

1983 Florida State Seminoles football

Peach Bowl champion

Peach Bowl, W 28–3 vs. North Carolina
- Conference: Independent
- Record: 8–4
- Head coach: Bobby Bowden (8th season)
- Offensive coordinator: Wayne McDuffie (1st season)
- Offensive scheme: No-huddle spread
- Defensive coordinator: Jack Stanton (7th season)
- Base defense: 4–3
- Captain: Game captains
- Home stadium: Doak Campbell Stadium

1983 NCAA Division I-A independents football records
| | Conf. | | | | | Overall |
| Team | W | | L | | T | W | | L | | T |
|---|---|---|---|---|---|---|---|---|---|---|
| No. 1 Miami (FL) | | – | | – | | 11 | – | 1 | – | 0 |
| Virginia Tech | | – | | – | | 9 | – | 2 | – | 0 |
| No. 19 Boston College | | – | | – | | 9 | – | 3 | – | 0 |
| No. 16 West Virginia | | – | | – | | 9 | – | 3 | – | 0 |
| No. 20 East Carolina | | – | | – | | 8 | – | 3 | – | 0 |
| No. 18 Pittsburgh | | – | | – | | 8 | – | 3 | – | 1 |
| Florida State | | – | | – | | 8 | – | 4 | – | 0 |
| Penn State | | – | | – | | 8 | – | 4 | – | 1 |
| Southern Miss | | – | | – | | 7 | – | 4 | – | 0 |
| Memphis State | | – | | – | | 6 | – | 4 | – | 1 |
| Notre Dame | | – | | – | | 7 | – | 5 | – | 0 |
| Syracuse | | – | | – | | 6 | – | 5 | – | 0 |
| South Carolina | | – | | – | | 5 | – | 6 | – | 0 |
| Cincinnati | | | – | | | 4 | – | 6 | – | 1 |
| Southwestern Louisiana | | – | | – | | 4 | – | 6 | – | 0 |
| Temple | | – | | – | | 4 | – | 7 | – | 0 |
| Tulane | | – | | – | | 4 | – | 7 | – | 0 |
| Louisville | | – | | – | | 3 | – | 8 | – | 0 |
| Navy | | – | | – | | 3 | – | 8 | – | 0 |
| Rutgers | | – | | – | | 3 | – | 8 | – | 0 |
| Army | | – | | – | | 2 | – | 9 | – | 0 |
Rankings from AP Poll

The 1983 Florida State Seminoles football team represented Florida State University as an independent during the 1983 NCAA Division I-A football season. The team was coached by Bobby Bowden and played their home games at Doak Campbell Stadium.

== Schedule ==
| Date | Time | Opponent | Rank | Site | TV | Result | Attendance | Source |
|---|---|---|---|---|---|---|---|---|
| September 3 | 7:00 p.m. | East Carolina | No. 7 | Doak Campbell Stadium; Tallahassee, FL | | W 47–46 | 46,261 | |
| September 10 | 3:00 p.m. | at No. 13 LSU | No. 12 | Tiger Stadium; Baton Rouge, LA | ABC | W 40–35 | 79,665 | |
| September 17 | 2:30 p.m. | at Tulane | No. 9 | Louisiana Superdome; New Orleans, LA | | W 28–34 (Tulane forfeit) | 35,463 | |
| October 1 | 2:30 p.m. | at No. 10 Auburn | No. 17 | Jordan-Hare Stadium; Auburn, AL | | L 24–27 | 75,625 | |
| October 8 | 1:30 p.m. | at Pittsburgh | | Pitt Stadium; Pittsburgh, PA | | L 16–17 | 52,654 | |
| October 15 | 7:00 p.m. | Cincinnati^{†} | | Doak Campbell Stadium; Tallahassee, FL | | W 43–17 | 55,102 | |
| October 20 | 8:00 p.m. | Louisville | | Doak Campbell Stadium; Tallahassee, FL | | W 51–7 | 42,117 | |
| October 29 | 10:30 p.m. | at Arizona State | | Sun Devil Stadium; Tempe, AZ | | W 29–26 | 69,986 | |
| November 5 | 7:00 p.m. | South Carolina | | Doak Campbell Stadium; Tallahassee, FL | | W 45–30 | 52,542 | |
| November 12 | 7:00 p.m. | No. 6 Miami (FL) | | Doak Campbell Stadium; Tallahassee, FL (rivalry) | WSVN | L 16–17 | 57,333 | |
| December 3 | 12:30 p.m. | at No. 12 Florida | | Florida Field; Gainesville, FL (rivalry) | CBS | L 14–53 | 74,113 | |
| December 30 | 3:00 p.m. | vs. North Carolina | | Atlanta–Fulton County Stadium; Atlanta, GA (Peach Bowl) | CBS | W 28–3 | 25,648 | |
^{†}Homecoming; Rankings from AP Poll released prior to the game; All times are in Eastern time
