= 1983 Pittsburgh Panthers football team =

American college football season

1983 Pittsburgh Panthers football

Fiesta Bowl, L 23–28 vs. Ohio State
- Conference: Independent

Ranking
- Coaches: No. 19
- AP: No. 18
- Record: 8–3–1
- Head coach: Foge Fazio (2nd season)
- Offensive coordinator: Joe Moore (2nd season)
- Offensive scheme: West Coast
- Defensive coordinator: Bob Junko (1st season)
- Base defense: Multiple front
- Home stadium: Pitt Stadium

1983 Major eastern college football independents records
	Conf.					Overall
Team	W		L		T	W		L		T
Penn State	4	–	1	–	1	8	–	4	–	1
No. 16 West Virginia	4	–	2	–	0	9	–	3	–	0
No. 18 Pittsburgh	2	–	1	–	1	8	–	3	–	1
No. 19 Boston College $	3	–	2	–	0	9	–	3	–	0
Syracuse	3	–	3	–	0	6	–	5	–	0
Temple	2	–	4	–	0	4	–	7	–	0
Rutgers	0	–	5	–	0	3	–	8	–	0
$ – Lambert Trophy Winner; Rankings from AP Poll

1983 NCAA Division I-A independents football records
	Conf.					Overall
Team	W		L		T	W		L		T
No. 1 Miami (FL)		–		–		11	–	1	–	0
Virginia Tech		–		–		9	–	2	–	0
No. 19 Boston College		–		–		9	–	3	–	0
No. 16 West Virginia		–		–		9	–	3	–	0
No. 20 East Carolina		–		–		8	–	3	–	0
No. 18 Pittsburgh		–		–		8	–	3	–	1
Florida State		–		–		8	–	4	–	0
Penn State		–		–		8	–	4	–	1
Southern Miss		–		–		7	–	4	–	0
Memphis State		–		–		6	–	4	–	1
Notre Dame		–		–		7	–	5	–	0
Syracuse		–		–		6	–	5	–	0
South Carolina		–		–		5	–	6	–	0
Cincinnati			–			4	–	6	–	1
Southwestern Louisiana		–		–		4	–	6	–	0
Temple		–		–		4	–	7	–	0
Tulane		–		–		4	–	7	–	0
Louisville		–		–		3	–	8	–	0
Navy		–		–		3	–	8	–	0
Rutgers		–		–		3	–	8	–	0
Army		–		–		2	–	9	–	0
Rankings from AP Poll

The 1983 Pittsburgh Panthers football team represented the University of Pittsburgh as an independent during the 1983 NCAA Division I-A football season.

== Schedule ==
Date	Time	Opponent	Rank	Site	TV	Result	Attendance	Source
September 3	7:30 p.m.	at Tennessee		Neyland Stadium; Knoxville, TN		W 13–3	95,824	
September 10	1:30 p.m.	Temple		Pitt Stadium; Pittsburgh, PA		W 35–0	45,713	
September 24	1:30 p.m.	at Maryland	No. 16	Byrd Stadium; College Park, MD		L 7–13	48,500	
October 1	12:30 p.m.	at No. 7 West Virginia		Mountaineer Field; Morgantown, WV (Backyard Brawl)	CBS	L 21–24	64,076	
October 8	1:30 p.m.	Florida State		Pitt Stadium; Pittsburgh, PA		W 17–16	52,654	
October 15	7:00 p.m.	at Louisville		Cardinal Stadium; Louisville, KY		W 55–10	31,447	
October 22	1:30 p.m.	at Navy		Navy–Marine Corps Memorial Stadium; Annapolis, MD		W 21–14	33,349	
October 29	1:30 p.m.	Syracuse^{†}		Pitt Stadium; Pittsburgh, PA (rivalry)		W 13–10	52,374	
November 5	1:30 p.m.	at No. 18 Notre Dame		Notre Dame Stadium; Notre Dame, IN (rivalry)	CBS	W 21–16	59,075	
November 12	1:30 p.m.	Army	No. 20	Pitt Stadium; Pittsburgh, PA		W 38–7	38,500	
November 19	1:30 p.m.	Penn State	No. 17	Pitt Stadium; Pittsburgh, PA (rivalry)		T 24–24	60,283	
January 2	1:30 p.m.	vs. No. 14 Ohio State	No. 15	Sun Devil Stadium; Tempe, AZ (Fiesta Bowl)	NBC	L 23–28	66,484	
^{†}Homecoming; Rankings from AP Poll released prior to the game; All times are in Eastern time

== Coaching staff ==
1983 Pittsburgh Panthers football staff
Coaching staff: Foge Fazio – Head coach; Joe Moore – Assistant head coach/offensive coordinator/offensive line; Bob Junko – Defensive coordinator/linebackers; Dino Folino – Defensive backs; Carmen Grosso – Tight ends; Kent Schoolfield – Wide receivers; Gerry Solomon – Defensive ends; Don Thompson – Defensive line; Ron Turner – Quarterbacks; Andy Urbanic – Running backs	Support staff: Alex Kramer – Administrative assistant; Joe Duff – Recruiting coordinator; Curt Cignetti – Graduate assistant; Rick Dukovich – Graduate assistant; Paul Dunn – Graduate assistant; Hal Hunter – Graduate assistant	Strength and conditioning staff: Buddy Morris – Weight training coordinator

== Team players drafted into the NFL ==
Player	Position	Round	Pick	NFL club
Bill Maas	Nose Tackle	1	5	Kansas City Chiefs
Jim Sweeney	Center	2	37	New York Jets
Joe McCall	Running back	3	84	Los Angeles Raiders
Tom Flynn	Defensive back	5	126	Green Bay Packers
Dwight Collins	Wide receiver	6	154	Minnesota Vikings
Al Wenglikowski	Linebacker	10	258	Kansas City Chiefs
