= 1983 Virginia Tech Hokies football team =

American college football season

1983 Virginia Tech Hokies football
- Conference: Independent
- Record: 9–2
- Head coach: Bill Dooley (6th season)
- Defensive coordinator: John Gutekunst (3rd season)
- Home stadium: Lane Stadium

1983 NCAA Division I-A independents football records
	Conf.					Overall
Team	W		L		T	W		L		T
No. 1 Miami (FL)		–		–		11	–	1	–	0
Virginia Tech		–		–		9	–	2	–	0
No. 19 Boston College		–		–		9	–	3	–	0
No. 16 West Virginia		–		–		9	–	3	–	0
No. 20 East Carolina		–		–		8	–	3	–	0
No. 18 Pittsburgh		–		–		8	–	3	–	1
Florida State		–		–		8	–	4	–	0
Penn State		–		–		8	–	4	–	1
Southern Miss		–		–		7	–	4	–	0
Memphis State		–		–		6	–	4	–	1
Notre Dame		–		–		7	–	5	–	0
Syracuse		–		–		6	–	5	–	0
South Carolina		–		–		5	–	6	–	0
Cincinnati			–			4	–	6	–	1
Southwestern Louisiana		–		–		4	–	6	–	0
Temple		–		–		4	–	7	–	0
Tulane		–		–		4	–	7	–	0
Louisville		–		–		3	–	8	–	0
Navy		–		–		3	–	8	–	0
Rutgers		–		–		3	–	8	–	0
Army		–		–		2	–	9	–	0
Rankings from AP Poll

The 1983 Virginia Tech Hokies football team was an American football team that represented Virginia Tech as an independent during the 1983 NCAA Division I-A football season. In their sixth year under head coach Bill Dooley, the Hokies compiled an overall record of 9–2. Tech was never ranked during the year by the Associated Press and didn't get an invitation to one of the 15 post-season bowls played after the 1983 season. The Hokies lost its only game to a ranked team, 13-0, to No. 4 West Virginia in Morgantown with a national TV audience watching. The team also lost its season opener at home against Wake Forest by a 13-6 score. Tech won its final game of the season over UVA 48-0 in Charlottesville.

== Schedule ==
Date	Opponent	Site	TV	Result	Attendance	Source
September 10	Wake Forest	Lane Stadium; Blacksburg, VA		L 6–13	26,300	
September 17	at Memphis State	Liberty Bowl Memorial Stadium; Memphis, TN		W 17–10	39,528	
September 24	VMI	Lane Stadium; Blacksburg, VA (rivalry)		W 28–0	32,300	
October 1	Louisville	Lane Stadium; Blacksburg, VA		W 31–0	28,300	
October 8	Duke	Lane Stadium; Blacksburg, VA		W 27–14	40,700	
October 15	at No. 4 West Virginia	Mountaineer Field; Morgantown, WV (rivalry)	CBS	L 0–13	57,181	
October 22	Richmond^{†}	Lane Stadium; Blacksburg, VA		W 38–0	34,400	
October 29	William & Mary	Lane Stadium; Blacksburg, VA		W 59–21	28,300	
November 5	at Tulane	Louisiana Superdome; New Orleans, LA		W 26–10	21,391	
November 12	Vanderbilt	Lane Stadium; Blacksburg, VA		W 21–10	27,300	
November 19	at Virginia	Scott Stadium; Charlottesville, VA (rivalry)		W 48–0	44,572	
^{†}Homecoming; Rankings from AP Poll released prior to the game

== Computer Ranking ==
Using the Simple Rating System (SRS) of College Football Reference that takes into account strength of schedule and modified point differential, Tech was the 20th ranked team in the country.

== Roster ==
1983 Virginia Tech Hokies football team roster
Players
Coaches
Offense

Pos.	#	Name	Class
QB	11	Perry Agee	Jr
QB	8	Mark Cox	Jr
WR		Donald Snell	Fr

Defense

Pos.	#	Name	Class
DB	21	Bryan Burleigh	Sr
DE	36	Rusty Cook	Jr
DE	78	Bruce Smith	Jr

Special teams

Pos.	#	Name	Class
P	15	David Cox	Jr

Head coach

- Bill Dooley

Coordinators/assistant coaches

- John Gutekunst
  (Defensive coordinator & defensive ends coach)

Legend

- (C) Team captain
- (S) Suspended
- (I) Ineligible
- Injured
- Redshirt
