= 1983 Army Cadets football team =

American college football season

1983 Army Cadets football
- Conference: Independent
- Record: 2–9
- Head coach: Jim Young (1st season)
- Offensive scheme: Triple option
- Defensive coordinator: Bob Sutton (1st season)
- Base defense: 4–3
- Captain: Jim Mitroka
- Home stadium: Michie Stadium

1983 NCAA Division I-A independents football records
| | Conf. | | | | | Overall |
| Team | W | | L | | T | W | | L | | T |
|---|---|---|---|---|---|---|---|---|---|---|
| No. 1 Miami (FL) | | – | | – | | 11 | – | 1 | – | 0 |
| Virginia Tech | | – | | – | | 9 | – | 2 | – | 0 |
| No. 19 Boston College | | – | | – | | 9 | – | 3 | – | 0 |
| No. 16 West Virginia | | – | | – | | 9 | – | 3 | – | 0 |
| No. 20 East Carolina | | – | | – | | 8 | – | 3 | – | 0 |
| No. 18 Pittsburgh | | – | | – | | 8 | – | 3 | – | 1 |
| Florida State | | – | | – | | 8 | – | 4 | – | 0 |
| Penn State | | – | | – | | 8 | – | 4 | – | 1 |
| Southern Miss | | – | | – | | 7 | – | 4 | – | 0 |
| Memphis State | | – | | – | | 6 | – | 4 | – | 1 |
| Notre Dame | | – | | – | | 7 | – | 5 | – | 0 |
| Syracuse | | – | | – | | 6 | – | 5 | – | 0 |
| South Carolina | | – | | – | | 5 | – | 6 | – | 0 |
| Cincinnati | | | – | | | 4 | – | 6 | – | 1 |
| Southwestern Louisiana | | – | | – | | 4 | – | 6 | – | 0 |
| Temple | | – | | – | | 4 | – | 7 | – | 0 |
| Tulane | | – | | – | | 4 | – | 7 | – | 0 |
| Louisville | | – | | – | | 3 | – | 8 | – | 0 |
| Navy | | – | | – | | 3 | – | 8 | – | 0 |
| Rutgers | | – | | – | | 3 | – | 8 | – | 0 |
| Army | | – | | – | | 2 | – | 9 | – | 0 |
Rankings from AP Poll

The 1983 Army Cadets football team was an American football team that represented the United States Military Academy as an independent during the 1983 NCAA Division I-A football season. In their first season under head coach Jim Young, the Cadets compiled a 2–9 record and were outscored by their opponents by a combined total of 304 to 140. In the annual Army–Navy Game, the Cadets lost to Navy by a 42–13 score.

== Schedule ==
| Date | Time | Opponent | Site | Result | Attendance | Source |
|---|---|---|---|---|---|---|
| September 10 | | Colgate | Michie Stadium; West Point, NY | L 13–15 | 33,285 | |
| September 17 | | at Louisville | Cardinal Stadium; Louisville, KY | L 7–31 | 27,454 | |
| September 24 | | Dartmouth | Michie Stadium; West Point, NY | W 13–12 | 36,637 | |
| October 1 | | at Harvard | Harvard Stadium; Boston, MA | L 21–24 | 15,000 | |
| October 8 | | Rutgers | Michie Stadium; West Point, NY | W 20–12 | 40,741 | |
| October 15 | 1:00 p.m. | vs. Notre Dame | Giants Stadium; East Rutherford, NJ (rivalry) | L 0–42 | 75,131 | |
| October 22 | | Lehigh | Michie Stadium; West Point, NY | L 12–13 | 41,000 | |
| October 29 | | at Air Force | Falcon Stadium; Colorado Springs, CO (Commander-in-Chief's Trophy) | L 20–41 | 47,032 | |
| November 5 | | Boston College | Michie Stadium; West Point, NY | L 14–34 | 40,749 | |
| November 12 | 1:30 p.m. | at Pittsburgh | Pitt Stadium; Pittsburgh, PA | L 7–38 | 38,500 | |
| November 25 | | vs. Navy | Rose Bowl Stadium; Pasadena, CA (Army–Navy Game) | L 13–42 | 81,347 | |
All times are in Eastern time

== Game summaries ==
=== vs Navy ===
Army Cadets (2–8) vs. Navy Midshipmen (2–8)

| Quarter | 1 | 2 | 3 | 4 | Total |
|---|---|---|---|---|---|
| Navy | 21 | 0 | 7 | 14 | 42 |
| Army | 0 | 6 | 7 | 0 | 13 |

at Rose Bowl, Pasadena, California

- Date: November 25, 1983
- Game attendance: 81,347
- TV announcers (ABC): Al Michaels and Lee Grosscup

Game information

First quarter

- NAVY – Eric Wallace 95-yard kickoff return (Steve Young kick), 14:43. Navy 7–0.
- NAVY – Napoleon McCallum 14-yard run (Steve Young kick), 12:30. Navy 14–0.
- NAVY – Steve Brady 35-yard interception return (Steve Young kick), 11:03. Navy 21–0.

Second quarter

- ARMY – Craig Stopa 42-yard field goal. Navy 21–3.
- ARMY – Craig Stopa 40-yard field goal. Navy 21–6.

Third quarter

- ARMY – Bill Turner 1-yard run (Craig Stopa kick). Navy 21–13.
- NAVY – Rick Williamson 1-yard run (Steve Young kick). Navy 28–13. Drive: 77 yards.

Fourth quarter

- NAVY – Rick Williamson 2-yard run (Steve Young kick). Navy 35–13. Drive: 54 yards.
- NAVY – Ron McDonald 30-yard run (Steve Young kick). Navy 42–13.

Top passers

- NAVY – Rick Williamson – 3/9, 29 yards, INT
- ARMY – Bill Turner – 16/35, 171 yards, INT

Top rushers

- NAVY – Napoleon McCallum – 30 rushes, 182 yards, TD
- ARMY – Elton Akins – 23 rushes, 40 yards

Top receivers

- NAVY – Mark Stevens – 2 receptions, 29 yards
- ARMY – Rob Dickerson – 6 receptions, 60 yards

The first four minutes probably were the worst four minutes I have ever experienced in coaching.

— Jim Young

External videos
- Full game

== Roster ==
1983 Army Cadets football team roster
Players
Coaches
Offense

| Pos. | # | Name | Class |
|---|---|---|---|
| RB | | Elton Akins |
| RB | | Cleveland Bazemore |
| TE | | Rob Dickerson |
| OL | | Pete Edmunds |
| QB | | Dave Grasch |
| OL | | Shamus Hanlon |
| QB | | Rob Healy | So |
| OL | | Karl Heinemen |
| WR | | Jarvis Hollingsworth |
| RB | | Travis Jackson |
| RB | | William Lampley |
| QB | | Rich Laughlin |
| OL | | Church Matthews |
| RB | | Kevin McKelvey |
| WR | | Billy Noble |
| WR | | Matt Oliver |
| | | Bryan Parlier | So |
| RB | | David Pratt |
| OL | | Ron Reusch |
| OL | | Ron Rice |
| OL | | Don Smith |
| WR | | Scott Spellman |
| TE | | Mark Triplett |
| QB | | Bill Turner | So |
| WR | | Ben White |
| WR | | Dave Woolf |
| OL | | Dave Woolfolk |
| TE | | Scott Wuestner |
| RB | | Art Zarone |

Defense

| Pos. | # | Name | Class |
|---|---|---|---|
| DB | | Herb Aten |
| DB | | Greg Bastin |
| DB | | Dee Bryant |
| DL | | Larry Carroll |
| DL | | Tom Malloy |
| LB | | Jim Gentile |
| DL | | Brian Gibbons |
| DB | | Eric Griffin |
| DE | | Kurt Gutierrez |
| DL | | Jim Jennings |
| DB | | Kermit McKelvey |
| LB | | John Roney |
| DB | | Nate Sassaman |
| DL | | Mike Staver |
| DL | | Glen Veevaert |
| DL | | Lloyd Walker |

Special teams

| Pos. | # | Name | Class |
|---|---|---|---|
| P | | Joe Sartiano |
| K | | Craig Stopa |

Head coach

- Jim Young

Coordinators/assistant coaches

Legend

- (C) Team captain
- (S) Suspended
- (I) Ineligible
- Injured
- Redshirt
