= 1983 Penn State Nittany Lions football team =

American college football season

1983 Penn State Nittany Lions football

Aloha Bowl champion

Aloha Bowl, W 13–10 vs. Washington
- Conference: Independent

Ranking
- Coaches: No. 17
- Record: 8–4–1
- Head coach: Joe Paterno (18th season)
- Offensive coordinator: Dick Anderson (3rd season)
- Offensive scheme: Pro-style
- Defensive coordinator: Jerry Sandusky (7th season)
- Base defense: 4–3
- Captains: Ron Heller; Kenny Jackson; Scott Radecic; Mark Robinson
- Home stadium: Beaver Stadium

1983 Major eastern college football independents records
	Conf.					Overall
Team	W		L		T	W		L		T
Penn State	4	–	1	–	1	8	–	4	–	1
No. 16 West Virginia	4	–	2	–	0	9	–	3	–	0
No. 18 Pittsburgh	2	–	1	–	1	8	–	3	–	1
No. 19 Boston College $	3	–	2	–	0	9	–	3	–	0
Syracuse	3	–	3	–	0	6	–	5	–	0
Temple	2	–	4	–	0	4	–	7	–	0
Rutgers	0	–	5	–	0	3	–	8	–	0
$ – Lambert Trophy Winner; Rankings from AP Poll

1983 NCAA Division I-A independents football records
	Conf.					Overall
Team	W		L		T	W		L		T
No. 1 Miami (FL)		–		–		11	–	1	–	0
Virginia Tech		–		–		9	–	2	–	0
No. 19 Boston College		–		–		9	–	3	–	0
No. 16 West Virginia		–		–		9	–	3	–	0
No. 20 East Carolina		–		–		8	–	3	–	0
No. 18 Pittsburgh		–		–		8	–	3	–	1
Florida State		–		–		8	–	4	–	0
Penn State		–		–		8	–	4	–	1
Southern Miss		–		–		7	–	4	–	0
Memphis State		–		–		6	–	4	–	1
Notre Dame		–		–		7	–	5	–	0
Syracuse		–		–		6	–	5	–	0
South Carolina		–		–		5	–	6	–	0
Cincinnati			–			4	–	6	–	1
Southwestern Louisiana		–		–		4	–	6	–	0
Temple		–		–		4	–	7	–	0
Tulane		–		–		4	–	7	–	0
Louisville		–		–		3	–	8	–	0
Navy		–		–		3	–	8	–	0
Rutgers		–		–		3	–	8	–	0
Army		–		–		2	–	9	–	0
Rankings from AP Poll

The 1983 Penn State Nittany Lions football team represented the Pennsylvania State University as an independent during the 1983 NCAA Division I-A football season. Led by 18th-year head coach Joe Paterno, the Nittany Lions compiled a record of 8–4–1. Penn State was invited to the Aloha Bowl, where the Nittany Lions defeated Washington. The team played home games in Beaver Stadium in University Park, Pennsylvania.

== Schedule ==
Date	Time	Opponent	Rank	Site	TV	Result	Attendance	Source
August 29	9:00 p.m.	vs. No. 1 Nebraska	No. 4	Giants Stadium; East Rutherford, NJ (Kickoff Classic)	KATZ	L 6–44	71,123	
September 10	1:30 p.m.	Cincinnati	No. 20	Beaver Stadium; University Park, PA		L 3–14	83,683	
September 17	1:30 p.m.	No. 13 Iowa		Beaver Stadium; University Park, PA		L 34–42	84,628	
September 24	1:30 p.m.	at Temple		Veterans Stadium; Philadelphia, PA		W 23–18	35,760	
October 1	1:30 p.m.	at Rutgers		Giants Stadium; East Rutherford, NJ		W 36–25	32,804	
October 8	3:45 p.m.	No. 3 Alabama		Beaver Stadium; University Park, PA (rivalry)	CBS	W 34–28	85,614	
October 15	1:30 p.m.	at Syracuse		Carrier Dome; Syracuse, NY (rivalry)		W 17–6	50,010	
October 22	1:30 p.m.	No. 4 West Virginia^{†}		Beaver Stadium; University Park, PA (rivalry)		W 41–23	86,309	
October 29	3:50 p.m.	at No. 19 Boston College		Sullivan Stadium; Foxborough, MA	ABC	L 17–27	56,605	
November 5	1:00 p.m.	Brown		Beaver Stadium; University Park, PA		W 38–21	84,670	
November 12	1:00 p.m.	Notre Dame		Beaver Stadium; University Park, PA (rivalry)	ESPN (tape delay)	W 34–30	85,899	
November 19	1:00 p.m.	at No. 17 Pittsburgh		Pitt Stadium; Pittsburgh, PA (rivalry)		T 24–24	60,283	
December 26	8:00 p.m.	vs. Washington		Aloha Stadium; Halawa, HI (Aloha Bowl)	ESPN	W 13–10	37,212	
^{†}Homecoming; Rankings from AP Poll released prior to the game; All times are in Eastern time

== Roster ==
1983 Penn State Nittany Lions football team roster
Players
Coaches
Offense

Pos.	#	Name	Class
C	58	Nick Haden	Jr
OT	72	Ron Heller	Sr
WR	82	Kenny Jackson	Sr
RB	29	Tony Mumford	Jr

Defense

Pos.	#	Name	Class
LB	95	Rogers Alexander	Jr
LB	31	Shane Conlan	So
LB	53	Don Graham	So
S	22	Ray Isom	So
LB	55	Tim Johnson	So
LB	97	Scott Radecic	Sr
S	32	Mark Robinson	Sr
DB	43	Mike Zordich	So

Special teams

Pos.	#	Name	Class
PK	10	Massimo Manca	Fr

Head coach

- Joe Paterno

Coordinators/assistant coaches

- Dick Anderson
- John Bove
- Tom Bradley
- Booker Brooks
- Randy Crowder
- Fran Ganter
- Bob Phillips
- Jerry Sandusky
- Jim Williams

Legend

- (C) Team captain
- (S) Suspended
- (I) Ineligible
- Injured
- Redshirt

== NFL draft ==
Eight Nittany Lions were drafted in the 1984 NFL draft.

Round	Pick	Overall	Name	Position	Team
1st	4	4	Kenny Jackson	Wide receiver	Philadelphia Eagles
2nd	6	34	Scott Radecic	Linebacker	Kansas City Chiefs
3rd	14	70	Jon Williams	Running back	New England Patriots
4th	6	90	Mark Robinson	Defensive back	Kansas City Chiefs
4th	28	112	Ron Heller	Offensive tackle	Tampa Bay Buccaneers
7th	8	176	Harry Hamilton	Defensive back	New York Jets
8th	1	197	Kevin Baugh	Wide receiver	Houston Oilers
9th	18	242	George Reynolds	Punter	Los Angeles Rams
