= Lawrence Thompson =

American football player (born 1961)

No. 89
- Position: Wide receiver

Personal information
- Born: January 6, 1961 (age 65); Wauchula, Florida, U.S.
- Listed height: 5 ft 11 in (1.80 m)
- Listed weight: 167 lb (76 kg)

Career information
- High school: Hardee (Wauchula)
- College: Miami (1980–1983)
- NFL draft: 1984: 11th round, 308th overall pick

Career history
- Minnesota Vikings (1984)*; Winnipeg Blue Bombers (1985)*; Calgary Stampeders (1985)
- * Offseason or practice squad member only

Awards and highlights
- National champion (1983)

Career CFL statistics
- Games played: 3
- Receptions: 4
- Receiving yards: 96
- Fumble recoveries: 1

Lawrence Thompson (born January 6, 1961) is an American former professional football wide receiver who played in the National Football League (NFL) with the Minnesota Vikings and the Canadian Football League (CFL) with the Winnipeg Blue Bombers and Calgary Stampeders. He played college football for the Miami Hurricanes.

== Early life ==
Thompson was born on January 6, 1961, in Wauchula, Florida. He attended Hardee High School in Wauchula and played football as a defensive back, running back and wide receiver. Thompson committed to play college football at the University of Miami.

== College career ==
Thompson played college football for the Miami Hurricanes from 1980 to 1983. He was a three-year letterman from 1980 to 1982. In 44 games, Thompson had 99 rushing yards, five receptions for 77 yards and one touchdown and 350 return yards. In his senior year, he was demoted to the third team due to poor grades eventually quit the team after seeing little usage but did return for the national championship.

== Professional career ==
=== Minnesota Vikings ===
Thompson was selected in the eleventh round, with the 308th overall selection, by the Minnesota Vikings in the 1984 NFL draft. On September 5, 1984, he was waived by the team.

=== Winnipeg Blue Bombers ===
In 1985, Thompson signed with the Winnipeg Blue Bombers of the Canadian Football League (CFL) but did not see any game action.

=== Calgary Stampeders ===
On June 19, 1985, Thompson was traded to the Calgary Stampeders for "future considerations". He played in four games and had four receptions for 96 yards and one fumble recovery. On August 20, Thompson was placed on a 21-day trial but was eventually released from the team.
