= 1983 Cincinnati Bearcats football team =

American college football season

1983 Cincinnati Bearcats football
- Conference: Independent
- Record: 4–6–1
- Head coach: Watson Brown (1st season)
- Defensive coordinator: Dick Hopkins (1st season)
- Captains: Gene Beck; Bill Booze; Don Goodman; George Jamison; Linwood Marshall
- Home stadium: Riverfront Stadium, Nippert Stadium

1983 NCAA Division I-A independents football records
	Conf.					Overall
Team	W		L		T	W		L		T
No. 1 Miami (FL)		–		–		11	–	1	–	0
Virginia Tech		–		–		9	–	2	–	0
No. 19 Boston College		–		–		9	–	3	–	0
No. 16 West Virginia		–		–		9	–	3	–	0
No. 20 East Carolina		–		–		8	–	3	–	0
No. 18 Pittsburgh		–		–		8	–	3	–	1
Florida State		–		–		8	–	4	–	0
Penn State		–		–		8	–	4	–	1
Southern Miss		–		–		7	–	4	–	0
Memphis State		–		–		6	–	4	–	1
Notre Dame		–		–		7	–	5	–	0
Syracuse		–		–		6	–	5	–	0
South Carolina		–		–		5	–	6	–	0
Cincinnati			–			4	–	6	–	1
Southwestern Louisiana		–		–		4	–	6	–	0
Temple		–		–		4	–	7	–	0
Tulane		–		–		4	–	7	–	0
Louisville		–		–		3	–	8	–	0
Navy		–		–		3	–	8	–	0
Rutgers		–		–		3	–	8	–	0
Army		–		–		2	–	9	–	0
Rankings from AP Poll

1983 NCAA Division I-AA independents football standings
	Conf.			Overall
Team	W	L	T	W		L		T
No. 3 Holy Cross ^		–		9	–	1	–	1
No. 17 Tennessee State		–		8	–	2	–	1
No. 7 Colgate ^		–		8	–	3	–	0
Lehigh		–		8	–	3	–	0
Lafayette		–		6	–	4	–	0
Northeastern		–		6	–	4	–	1
Southeastern Louisiana		–		6	–	5	–	0
William & Mary		–		6	–	5	–	0
Nicholls State		–		5	–	6	–	0
Bucknell		–		4	–	5	–	1
Delaware		–		4	–	7	–	0
Northwestern State		–		4	–	7	–	0
James Madison		–		3	–	8	–	0
Richmond		–		3	–	8	–	0
Western Kentucky		–		2	–	8	–	1
^ – NCAA Division I-AA playoff participant; Rankings from NCAA Division I-AA Football Committee poll

The 1983 Cincinnati Bearcats football team represented the University of Cincinnati during the 1983 NCAA Division I-AA football season. The Bearcats were led by first-year head coach Watson Brown. Due to an NCAA mandate that average attendance (home and away) exceed 20,000 fans, Cincinnati was to be relegated to NCAA Division I-AA. The program sued the NCAA, managing to limit the tenure of I-AA play to just the 1983 season, and played a schedule of mostly I-A opponents. They participated as independent and played their home games at Riverfront Stadium with on-campus Nippert Stadium being used as a supplement for the second of five straight seasons.

== Schedule ==
Date	Opponent	Site	Result	Attendance	Source
September 10	at No. 20 Penn State	Beaver Stadium; University Park, PA	W 14–3	83,683	
September 17	Oklahoma State	Nippert Stadium; Cincinnati, OH	L 17–27	25,934	
September 24	at Louisville	Cardinal Stadium; Louisville, KY (rivalry)	L 23–31	23,992	
October 1	Cornell	Riverfront Stadium; Cincinnati, OH	W 48–20	13,840	
October 8	Temple	Riverfront Stadium; Cincinnati, OH	W 31–16	18,272	
October 15	at Florida State	Doak Campbell Stadium; Tallahassee, FL	L 17–43	55,102	
October 22	No. 8 Miami (FL)	Riverfront Stadium; Cincinnati, OH	L 7–17	14,163	
October 29	at Kentucky	Commonwealth Stadium; Lexington, KY	T 13–13	57,789	
November 5	Rutgers^{†}	Riverfront Stadium; Cincinnati, OH	W 18–7	18,484	
November 12	Memphis State	Riverfront Stadium; Cincinnati, OH (rivalry)	L 10–43	12,125	
November 19	at Miami (OH)	Yager Stadium; Oxford, OH (Victory Bell)	L 10–14	25,254	
^{†}Homecoming; Rankings from AP Poll released prior to the game
