= 1983 West Virginia Mountaineers football team =

American college football season

1983 West Virginia Mountaineers football

Hall of Fame Classic champion

Hall of Fame Classic, W 20–16 vs. Kentucky
- Conference: Independent

Ranking
- Coaches: No. 16
- AP: No. 16
- Record: 9–3
- Head coach: Don Nehlen (4th season)
- Defensive coordinator: Dennis Brown (4th season)
- Home stadium: Mountaineer Field

1983 Major eastern college football independents records
	Conf.					Overall
Team	W		L		T	W		L		T
Penn State	4	–	1	–	1	8	–	4	–	1
No. 16 West Virginia	4	–	2	–	0	9	–	3	–	0
No. 18 Pittsburgh	2	–	1	–	1	8	–	3	–	1
No. 19 Boston College $	3	–	2	–	0	9	–	3	–	0
Syracuse	3	–	3	–	0	6	–	5	–	0
Temple	2	–	4	–	0	4	–	7	–	0
Rutgers	0	–	5	–	0	3	–	8	–	0
$ – Lambert Trophy Winner; Rankings from AP Poll

1983 NCAA Division I-A independents football records
	Conf.					Overall
Team	W		L		T	W		L		T
No. 1 Miami (FL)		–		–		11	–	1	–	0
Virginia Tech		–		–		9	–	2	–	0
No. 19 Boston College		–		–		9	–	3	–	0
No. 16 West Virginia		–		–		9	–	3	–	0
No. 20 East Carolina		–		–		8	–	3	–	0
No. 18 Pittsburgh		–		–		8	–	3	–	1
Florida State		–		–		8	–	4	–	0
Penn State		–		–		8	–	4	–	1
Southern Miss		–		–		7	–	4	–	0
Memphis State		–		–		6	–	4	–	1
Notre Dame		–		–		7	–	5	–	0
Syracuse		–		–		6	–	5	–	0
South Carolina		–		–		5	–	6	–	0
Cincinnati			–			4	–	6	–	1
Southwestern Louisiana		–		–		4	–	6	–	0
Temple		–		–		4	–	7	–	0
Tulane		–		–		4	–	7	–	0
Louisville		–		–		3	–	8	–	0
Navy		–		–		3	–	8	–	0
Rutgers		–		–		3	–	8	–	0
Army		–		–		2	–	9	–	0
Rankings from AP Poll

The 1983 West Virginia Mountaineers football team represented West Virginia University in the 1983 NCAA Division I-A football season. It was the Mountaineers' 91st overall season and they competed as a Division I-A Independent. The team was led by head coach Don Nehlen, in his fourth year, and played their home games at Mountaineer Field in Morgantown, West Virginia. They finished the season with a record of 9–3 and defeated Kentucky in the Hall of Fame Classic.

== Schedule ==
Date	Opponent	Rank	Site	TV	Result	Attendance	Source
September 3	Ohio		Mountaineer Field; Morgantown, WV		W 55–3	54,612	
September 10	Pacific (CA)		Mountaineer Field; Morgantown, WV		W 48–7	54,581	
September 17	at No. 17 Maryland	No. 20	Byrd Stadium; College Park, MD (rivalry)	WTBS	W 31–21	54,715	
September 24	at No. 19 Boston College	No. 12	Alumni Stadium; Chestnut Hill, MA	ABC	W 27–17	32,000	
October 1	Pittsburgh	No. 7	Mountaineer Field; Morgantown, WV (rivalry)	CBS	W 24–21	64,076	
October 15	Virginia Tech	No. 4	Mountaineer Field; Morgantown, WV (rivalry)	CBS	W 13–0	57,181	
October 22	at Penn State	No. 4	Beaver Stadium; University Park, PA (rivalry)		L 23–41	86,309	
October 29	at No. 7 Miami (FL)	No. 12	Miami Orange Bowl; Miami, FL		L 3–20	63,881	
November 5	Temple	No. 17	Mountaineer Field; Morgantown, WV		W 27–9	50,514	
November 12	Rutgers	No. 15	Mountaineer Field; Morgantown, WV		W 35–7	51,317	
November 19	at Syracuse	No. 14	Carrier Dome; Syracuse, NY (rivalry)	CBS	L 16–27	36,661	
December 23	vs. Kentucky	No. 18	Legion Field; Birmingham, AL (Hall of Fame Classic)	WTBS	W 20–16	42,000	
Rankings from AP Poll released prior to the game

== Season summary ==
Jeff Hostetler was the starting quarterback for the Mountaineers. He led the team with 2345 passing yards and 16 touchdowns. Leading the team in rushing was Tom Gray with 498 net yards. Rich Hollins led the team in receiving with 50 receptions for 781 yards. Paul Woodside was also a reliable commodity for the Mountaineers. The Mountaineer offense was rolling after its first two games. They had beaten their first two opponents by a combined 103–10 score, with a 55–3 win over Ohio, and a 48–7 win over Pacific. Their first test of the season came on the road against #17 Maryland, where the Mountaineers emerged victorious 31–21. The next week, the Mountaineers played on the road, against a second straight ranked opponent in #19 Boston College. Again, the Mountaineers emerged victorious 27–17. They then avenged a 13–16 loss at Pittsburgh the year before, by beating the Panthers 24–21 at home. The next week, they posted a second consecutive win over a major rival by shutting out Virginia Tech 13–0 at home. The win moved WVU's ranking up to 3rd in the major polls. The Mountaineers were beaten at Penn State, the next week, ruining their national title hopes. It is very possible, that had the Mountaineers won that, they would be playing for the national championship. They were still hung over the week after, losing to Miami 20–3, giving them 2 straight losses. WVU came back with a 27–9 win over Temple, and a 35–7 win over Rutgers. They lost at Syracuse the next week 27–16, and closed out the season with a 20–16 win over Kentucky in the Hall of Fame Bowl.

== Game summaries ==
=== Pittsburgh ===
Team	1	2	3	4	Total
Pittsburgh	14	7	0	0	21
• West Virginia	7	7	3	7	24

- Date: October 1
- Location: Mountaineer Field, Morgantown, WV

Scoring summary
1	WVU	Brown 19-yard pass from Hostetler (Woodside kick)	WVU 7-0
1	PITT	Quense 75-yard fumble return (Schubert kick)	Tied 7-7
1	PITT	Scales 21-yard run (Schubert kick)	PITT 14-7
2	WVU	Harvey 1-yard run (Woodside kick)	Tied 14-14
2	PITT	Wallace 35-yard pass from Congemi (Schubert kick)	PITT 21-14
3	WVU	Woodside 49-yard field goal	PITT 21-17
4	WVU	Hostetler 6-yard run (Woodside kick)	WVU 24-21

== Roster ==
1983 West Virginia Mountaineers football team roster
Players
Coaches
Offense

Pos.	#	Name	Class
QB	15	Jeff Hostetler	Sr
FB	36	Ron Wolfley	Jr
WR	48	Willie Drewrey	Jr

Defense

Pos.	#	Name	Class

Special teams

Pos.	#	Name	Class
K	3	Paul Woodside	Jr

Head coach

- Don Nehlen

Coordinators/assistant coaches

Legend

- (C) Team captain
- (S) Suspended
- (I) Ineligible
- Injured
- Redshirt
