= 1983 Southern Miss Golden Eagles football team =

American college football season

1983 Southern Miss Golden Eagles football
- Conference: Independent
- Record: 7–4
- Head coach: Jim Carmody (2nd season)
- Offensive coordinator: Keith Daniels (2nd season)
- Home stadium: M. M. Roberts Stadium

1983 NCAA Division I-A independents football records
	Conf.					Overall
Team	W		L		T	W		L		T
No. 1 Miami (FL)		–		–		11	–	1	–	0
Virginia Tech		–		–		9	–	2	–	0
No. 19 Boston College		–		–		9	–	3	–	0
No. 16 West Virginia		–		–		9	–	3	–	0
No. 20 East Carolina		–		–		8	–	3	–	0
No. 18 Pittsburgh		–		–		8	–	3	–	1
Florida State		–		–		8	–	4	–	0
Penn State		–		–		8	–	4	–	1
Southern Miss		–		–		7	–	4	–	0
Memphis State		–		–		6	–	4	–	1
Notre Dame		–		–		7	–	5	–	0
Syracuse		–		–		6	–	5	–	0
South Carolina		–		–		5	–	6	–	0
Cincinnati			–			4	–	6	–	1
Southwestern Louisiana		–		–		4	–	6	–	0
Temple		–		–		4	–	7	–	0
Tulane		–		–		4	–	7	–	0
Louisville		–		–		3	–	8	–	0
Navy		–		–		3	–	8	–	0
Rutgers		–		–		3	–	8	–	0
Army		–		–		2	–	9	–	0
Rankings from AP Poll

The 1983 Southern Miss Golden Eagles football team was an American football team that represented the University of Southern Mississippi as an independent during the 1983 NCAA Division I-A football season. In their second year under head coach Jim Carmody, the team compiled a 7–4 record.

== Schedule ==
Date	Opponent	Site	Result	Attendance	Source
September 3	Richmond	M. M. Roberts Stadium; Hattiesburg, MS	W 32–3	27,351	
September 10	at Auburn	Jordan–Hare Stadium; Auburn, AL	L 3–24	73,500	
September 17	Louisiana Tech	M. M. Roberts Stadium; Hattiesburg, MS (rivalry)	W 28–10	28,342	
October 1	at Ole Miss	Vaught–Hemingway Stadium; Oxford, MS	W 27–7	36,015	
October 8	vs. Mississippi State	Mississippi Veterans Memorial Stadium; Jackson, MS	W 31–6	58,311	
October 15	at Memphis State	Liberty Bowl Memorial Stadium; Memphis, TN (rivalry)	W 27–20	35,323	
October 22	Tulane	M. M. Roberts Stadium; Hattiesburg, MS (rivalry)	L 7–14	31,257	
October 29	Southwestern Louisiana^{†}	M. M. Roberts Stadium; Hattiesburg, MS	W 31–3	28,837	
November 5	at Louisville	Cardinal Stadium; Louisville, KY	W 27–3	17,064	
November 12	at No. 16 Alabama	Legion Field; Birmingham, AL	L 16–28	74,424	
November 19	East Carolina	M. M. Roberts Stadium; Hattiesburg, MS	L 6–10	21,000	
^{†}Homecoming; Rankings from AP Poll released prior to the game
