= 1983 Miami Hurricanes football team =

American college football season

1983 Miami Hurricanes football

Consensus national champion Orange Bowl champion

Orange Bowl, W 31–30 vs. Nebraska
- Conference: Independent

Ranking
- Coaches: No. 1
- AP: No. 1
- Record: 11–1
- Head coach: Howard Schnellenberger (5th season)
- Offensive coordinator: Gary Stevens (1st season)
- Offensive scheme: Pro-style
- Defensive coordinator: Tom Olivadotti (3rd season)
- Base defense: 5–2
- MVP: Glenn Dennison
- Home stadium: Miami Orange Bowl

1983 NCAA Division I-A independents football records
	Conf.					Overall
Team	W		L		T	W		L		T
No. 1 Miami (FL)		–		–		11	–	1	–	0
Virginia Tech		–		–		9	–	2	–	0
No. 19 Boston College		–		–		9	–	3	–	0
No. 16 West Virginia		–		–		9	–	3	–	0
No. 20 East Carolina		–		–		8	–	3	–	0
No. 18 Pittsburgh		–		–		8	–	3	–	1
Florida State		–		–		8	–	4	–	0
Penn State		–		–		8	–	4	–	1
Southern Miss		–		–		7	–	4	–	0
Memphis State		–		–		6	–	4	–	1
Notre Dame		–		–		7	–	5	–	0
Syracuse		–		–		6	–	5	–	0
South Carolina		–		–		5	–	6	–	0
Cincinnati			–			4	–	6	–	1
Southwestern Louisiana		–		–		4	–	6	–	0
Temple		–		–		4	–	7	–	0
Tulane		–		–		4	–	7	–	0
Louisville		–		–		3	–	8	–	0
Navy		–		–		3	–	8	–	0
Rutgers		–		–		3	–	8	–	0
Army		–		–		2	–	9	–	0
Rankings from AP Poll

The 1983 Miami Hurricanes football team represented the University of Miami as an independent during the 1983 NCAA Division I-A football season. In their 58th season of football, the \ Hurricanes were led by fifth-year head coach Howard Schnellenberger and played their home games at the Orange Bowl.

Unranked, Miami lost their opener at Florida by 25 points, but finished the regular season at 10–1, ranked fifth, and were invited to the Orange Bowl. Playing at home on January 2, the underdog Hurricanes upset top-ranked Nebraska 31–30, denying a two-point conversion attempt with less than a minute remaining. They climbed to first in the major polls to win the school's first national championship.

== Schedule ==
Date	Time	Opponent	Rank	Site	TV	Result	Attendance	Source
September 3		at No. 16 Florida		Florida Field; Gainesville, FL (rivalry)		L 3–28	73,907	
September 10		at Houston		Houston Astrodome; Houston, TX		W 29–7	20,000	
September 17		Purdue		Miami Orange Bowl; Miami, FL		W 35–0	34,557	
September 24	9:00 pm	No. 13 Notre Dame		Miami Orange Bowl; Miami, FL (rivalry)	CBS	W 20–0	52,480	
October 1	3:50 pm	at Duke	No. 15	Wallace Wade Stadium; Durham, NC	ABC	W 56–17	28,750	
October 8		Louisville	No. 12	Miami Orange Bowl; Miami, FL (rivalry)		W 42–14	30,073	
October 15		at Mississippi State	No. 10	Scott Field; Starkville, MS		W 31–7	29,456	
October 22		at Cincinnati	No. 8	Riverfront Stadium; Cincinnati, OH		W 17–7	14,163	
October 29		No. 12 West Virginia^{†}	No. 7	Miami Orange Bowl; Miami, FL		W 20–3	63,881	
November 5		East Carolina	No. 5	Miami Orange Bowl; Miami, FL		W 12–7	39,225	
November 12	7:00 pm	at Florida State	No. 6	Doak Campbell Stadium; Tallahassee, FL (rivalry)	WSVN	W 17–16	57,333	
January 2, 1984	8:00 pm	No. 1 Nebraska	No. 5	Miami Orange Bowl; Miami, FL (Orange Bowl) (rivalry)	NBC	W 31–30	72,596	
^{†}Homecoming; Rankings from AP Poll released prior to the game; All times are in Eastern time

== Game summaries ==
=== At Florida ===
Miami (FL) at Florida

Team	1	2	3	4	Total
Hurricanes	0	0	0	3	3
• No. 16 Gators	13	0	12	3	28

- Date: September 3
- Location: Florida Field • Gainesville, Florida
- Game attendance: 73,907

=== Purdue ===
Purdue Boilermakers at Miami (FL) Hurricanes

Quarter	1	2	3	4	Total
Purdue	0	0	0	0	0
Miami (FL)	7	21	7	0	35

at Orange Bowl • Miami, Florida

- Date: September 17
- Game attendance: 34,557

Game information

Purdue

- Everett
  16/22, 186 Yds, 2 INT
- Hawthorne
  12 Rush, 37 Yds
- Griffin
  5 Rec, 64 Yds

Miami (FL)

- Kosar
  12/20, 182 Yds, 3 TD, 2 INT
- Bentley
  15 Rush, 78 Yds
- Shakespeare
  4 Rec, 68 Yds, 2 TD

Scoring summary

Quarter	Time	Drive			Team	Scoring information	Score	
Quarter	Time	Plays	Yards	TOP	Team	Scoring information	PUR	MIA
1					Miami (FL)	Kosar 1-yard touchdown run, Davis kick good	0	7
2					Miami (FL)	Shakespeare 35-yard touchdown reception from Kosar, Davis kick good	0	14
2					Miami (FL)	Vanderwende 1-yard touchdown run, Davis kick good	0	21
2					Miami (FL)	Shakespeare 12-yard touchdown reception from Kosar, Davis kick good	0	21
3					Miami (FL)	Griffin 17-yard touchdown reception from Kosar, Davis kick good	0	28
"TOP" = time of possession. For other American football terms, see Glossary of American football.							0	28

=== At Florida State ===
Jeff Davis game-winning 19-yard field goal as time expired

=== Orange Bowl (vs Nebraska) ===
#1 Nebraska at #5 Miami (FL)

Team	1	2	3	4	Total
No.1 Cornhuskers	0	14	3	13	30
• No. 5 Hurricanes	17	0	14	0	31

- Date: January 2
- Location: Orange Bowl, Miami, Florida
- Game start: 8:05 p.m. EST
- Game attendance: 72,596
- Game weather: 66 °F (19 °C), partly cloudy, Wind N 10 mph (16 km/h)
- Referee: Jimmy Harper (SEC)
- TV announcers (NBC): Don Criqui and John Brodie
- Source: Box Score Archived 2019-08-22 at the Wayback Machine

Scoring summary
Q1	9:18	MIA	Dennison 2-yard pass from Kosar (Davis kick)	MIA 7–0
Q1	4:51	MIA	Davis 45-yard field goal	MIA 10–0
Q1	1:08	MIA	Dennison 22-yard pass from Kosar (Davis kick)	MIA 17–0
Q2	8:54	Neb	Steinkuhler 19-yard fumble return (Livingston kick)	MIA 17–7
Q2	2:17	Neb	Gill 1-yard run (Livingston kick)	MIA 17–14
Q3	13:09	Neb	Livingston 34-yard field goal	Tied 17–17
Q3	9:37	MIA	Highsmith 1-yard run (Davis kick)	MIA 24–17
Q3	4:44	MIA	Bentley 7-yard run (Davis kick)	MIA 31–17
Q4	6:55	Neb	Smith 1-yard run (Livingston kick)	MIA 31–24
Q4	0:48	Neb	Smith 24-yard run (Gill pass to Smith failed)	MIA 31–30

== Personnel ==
1983 Miami Hurricanes football team roster
Players
Coaches
Offense

Pos.	#	Name	Class
OL	73	David Alekna	Fr
RB	21	Jimmy Austin	So
RB	16	Albert Bentley	Sr
OL	79	Paul Bertucelli	Fr
RB	5	Mel Bratton	Fr
WR	40	Eddie Brown	Jr
OL	53	Rob Canei	Fr
OL	69	Juan Comendeiro
TE	86	Glenn Dennison	Sr
OL	68	Andy Dickerson	Jr
RB	44	Keith Griffin	Sr
RB	21	Mike Griffin	Fr
OL	52	David Heffernan	Jr
OL		Chris Hembrough
RB	30	Alonzo Highsmith	Fr
WR		David Kintigh	Fr
QB	20	Bernie Kosar	RFr
OL		Mike Moore
RB	38	Speedy Neal	Sr
OL	77	Paul O’Connor
RB	37	Darryl Oliver	Fr
WR	8	Kenny Oliver	So
OL	74	Gregg Rakoczy	Fr
WR	6	Stanley Shakespeare	Jr
OL	76	Ian Sinclair
WR	7	John Smatana
RB	46	Todd Stanish	Fr
QB	14	Vinny Testaverde	Fr
WR		Lawrence Thompson	Sr
QB		Kyle Vanderwende	So
OL	72	Alvin Ward

Defense

Pos.	#	Name	Class
DB	4	Rodney Bellinger	Sr
LB	54	Jay Brophy	Sr
DL	41	Danny Brown	Sr
DT	98	Jerome Brown	Fr
DB	2	Ken Calhoun
DL	64	Dallas Cameron	Jr
LB	99	Julio Cortes
DB	15	Dave Ditthardt	Jr
DT	95	Kevin Fagan	So
LB	51	Jack Fernandez	Sr
DL	62	Tony Fitzpatrick
LB	58	Bruce Fleming	So
LB	17	Fred Foster
DB	27	Greg Jones	Jr
DL		Joe Kohlbrand
DB	31	Matt McCloskey	Fr
DB	43	Doug McFadden	Fr
DL	93	John McVeigh	So
LB	92	Winston Moss	Fr
DL		Fred Robinson
LB	36	Ken Sisk	Sr
DB	1	Reggie Sutton	Fr
DB	83	John Ungham	Fr
DB		Keith Walker
DB	29	Eddie Williams	Sr

Special teams

Pos.	#	Name	Class
K	3	Jeff Davis
P		Steve Minie	Jr
P	12	Rick Tuten

Head coach

- Howard Schnellenberger

Coordinators/assistant coaches

- Hubbard Alexander (TE)
- Harold Allen (DL)
- Mike Archer (DB)
- Joe Brodsky (RB)
- Tom Olivadotti (DC/LB)
- Gary Stevens (OC/WR)
- Marc Trestman (QB)
- Bill Trout (DE)
- Chris Vagotis (OL)
- Ray Ganong (Str + Cond)
- Art Kehoe (GA)
- Bob Maddox (GA)
- George Halas (GA)
- Mike Rodriguez (Volunteer)

Legend

- (C) Team captain
- (S) Suspended
- (I) Ineligible
- Injured
- Redshirt

== Awards and honors ==
=== All-Americans ===
- Jay Brophy, LB
- Glenn Dennison, TE

=== Jack Harding University of Miami MVP Award ===
- Glenn Dennison, TE
