= Mike Kovaleski =

American football player (born 1965)

No. 97
- Position: Linebacker

Personal information
- Born: January 30, 1965 (age 61); Union City, Indiana, U.S.
- Listed height: 6 ft 2 in (1.88 m)
- Listed weight: 225 lb (102 kg)

Career information
- High school: New Castle
- College: Notre Dame
- NFL draft: 1987: undrafted

Career history
- Tampa Bay Buccaneers (1987)*; Cleveland Browns (1987)
- * Offseason or practice squad member only
- Stats at Pro Football Reference

Michael Aaron Kovaleski (born January 30, 1965) is an American former professional football linebacker who played for the Cleveland Browns of the National Football League (NFL). He played college football at University of Notre Dame.
