= 1983 NCAA Division I-A football rankings =

- Season: 1983
- Bowl season: 1983–84 bowl games
- Preseason No. 1: Nebraska
- End of season champions: Miami (FL)
- Conference with most teams in final AP poll: Big Ten and SEC (4)

Two human polls comprised the 1983 National Collegiate Athletic Association (NCAA) Division I-A football rankings. Unlike most sports, college football's governing body, the NCAA, does not bestow a national championship, instead that title is bestowed by one or more different polling agencies. There are two main weekly polls that begin in the preseason—the AP Poll and the Coaches Poll.

== Legend ==
	Increase in ranking
	Decrease in ranking
	Not ranked previous week
	National champion
(#–#)	Win–loss record
(Italics)	Number of first place votes
т	Tied with team above or below also with this symbol

== AP Poll ==
	Preseason Aug 28	Week 1 Sep 5	Week 2 Sep 12	Week 3 Sep 19	Week 4 Sep 26	Week 5 Oct 3	Week 6 Oct 10	Week 7 Oct 17	Week 8 Oct 24	Week 9 Oct 31	Week 10 Nov 7	Week 11 Nov 14	Week 12 Nov 21	Week 13 Nov 28	Week 14 Dec 5	Week 15 (Final) Jan 3	
1.	Nebraska (30)	Nebraska (1–0) (44)	Nebraska (2–0) (51)	Nebraska (3–0) (57)	Nebraska (4–0) (60)	Nebraska (5–0) (60)	Nebraska (6–0) (55)	Nebraska (7–0) (52)	Nebraska (8–0) (54)	Nebraska (9–0) (57)	Nebraska (10–0) (58)	Nebraska (11–0) (59)	Nebraska (11–0) (58)	Nebraska (12–0) (52)	Nebraska (12–0) (51)	Miami (FL) (11–1) (47 1/2)	1.
2.	Oklahoma (11)	Oklahoma (0–0) (3)	Oklahoma (1–0) (2)	Texas (1–0) (2)	Texas (2–0)	Texas (3–0)	Texas (4–0) (5)	Texas (5–0) (6)	Texas (6–0) (4)	Texas (7–0) (2)	Texas (8–0) (2)	Texas (9–0) (1)	Texas (10–0) (1)	Texas (11–0) (3)	Texas (11–0) (3)	Nebraska (12–1) (4 1/2)	2.
3.	Texas (3)	Texas (0–0) (2)	Texas (0–0) (2)	Ohio State (2–0)	Arizona (4–0)	Alabama (4–0)	North Carolina (6–0)	North Carolina (7–0)	North Carolina (7–0)	Auburn (7–1)	Auburn (8–1)	Auburn (9–1)	Auburn (9–1)	Auburn (9–1)	Auburn (10–1)	Auburn (11–1) (7)	3.
4.	Penn State (2)	Auburn (0–0) (1)	Notre Dame (1–0) (1)	Arizona (3–0)	Iowa (3–0)	North Carolina (5–0)	West Virginia (5–0)	West Virginia (6–0)	Auburn (6–1)	Georgia (7–0–1)	Georgia (8–0–1)	Illinois (9–1)	Illinois (10–1)	Illinois (10–1)	Illinois (10–1)	Georgia (10–1–1)	4.
5.	Auburn (2)	Notre Dame (0–0)	Auburn (1–0)	North Carolina (3–0)	North Carolina (4–0)	West Virginia (5–0)	Auburn (4–1)	Auburn (5–1)	Florida (6–0–1)	Miami (FL) (8–1)	Illinois (8–1)	Miami (FL) (10–1)	Miami (FL) (10–1)	Miami (FL) (10–1)	Miami (FL) (10–1)	Texas (11–1)	5.
6.	Notre Dame	Michigan (0–0)	Ohio State (1–0)	Alabama (2–0)	Alabama (3–0)	Ohio State (3–1)	Ohio State (4–1)	Florida (5–0–1)	Georgia (6–0–1)	Illinois (7–1)	Miami (FL) (9–1)	SMU (8–1)	SMU (9–1)	SMU (10–1)	SMU (10–1)	Florida (9–2–1)	6.
7.	Florida State (1)	Ohio State (0–0)	Arizona (2–0)	Iowa (2–0)	West Virginia (4–0)	Auburn (3–1)	Florida (5–0–1)	Georgia (5–0–1)	Miami (FL) (7–1)	Maryland (7–1)	SMU (7–1)	Georgia (8–1–1)	Georgia (8–1–1)	Georgia (9–1–1)	Georgia (9–1–1)	BYU (11–1)	7.
8.	USC	North Carolina (1–0)	Michigan (1–0)	Oklahoma (1–1)	Ohio State (2–1)	Oklahoma (3–1)	Georgia (4–0–1)	Miami (FL) (6–1)	Michigan (6–1)	SMU (6–1)	BYU (8–1)	Michigan (8–2)	Michigan (9–2)	Michigan (9–2)	Michigan (9–2)	Michigan (9–3)	8.
9.	Ohio State	USC (0–0)	Florida State (2–0)	Washington (2–0)	Oklahoma (2–1)	Florida (4–0–1)	Arizona (5–0–1)	SMU (5–0)	Illinois (6–1)	Florida (6–1–1)	Michigan (7–2)	BYU (9–1)	BYU (10–1)	BYU (10–1)	BYU (10–1)	Ohio State (9–3)	9.
10.	Michigan (1)	Georgia (1–0)	North Carolina (2–0)	USC (1–0–1)	Auburn (2–1)	Arizona (4–0–1)	Miami (FL) (5–1)	Michigan (5–1)	SMU (5–1)	North Carolina (7–1)	Ohio State (7–2)	Ohio State (8–2)	Iowa (9–2)	Iowa (9–2)	Iowa (9–2)	Illinois (10–2)	10.
11.	North Carolina	Arizona (1–0)	Georgia (1–0)	Auburn (1–1)	Georgia (2–0–1)	Georgia (3–0–1)	Alabama (4–1)	Illinois (5–1)	Washington (6–1)	Oklahoma (6–2)	Maryland (7–2)	Iowa (8–2)	Florida (7–2–1)	Clemson (9–1–1)	Florida (8–2–1)	Clemson (9–1–1)	11.
12.	LSU	Florida State (1–0)	Alabama (1–0)	West Virginia (3–0)	Florida (3–0–1)	Miami (FL) (4–1)	SMU (5–0)	Iowa (5–1)	West Virginia (6–1)	BYU (7–1)	Iowa (7–2)	Florida (7–2–1)	Clemson (9–1–1)	Florida (7–2–1)	Clemson (9–1–1)	SMU (10–2)	12.
13.	Alabama	LSU (0–0)	Iowa (1–0)	Notre Dame (1–1)	SMU (3–0)	SMU (4–0)	Michigan (4–1)	Arizona State (4–0–1)	Maryland (6–1)	Michigan (6–2)	Boston College (7–1)	Clemson (8–1–1)	Alabama (7–2)	Boston College (9–2)	Boston College (9–2)	Air Force (10–2)	13.
14.	Arizona	Alabama (0–0)	USC (0–0–1)	Georgia (1–0–1)	Michigan (2–1)	Michigan (3–1)	Iowa (4–1)	Washington (5–1)	Oklahoma (5–2)	Ohio State (6–2)	Florida (6–2–1)	West Virginia (8–2)	Ohio State (8–3)	Ohio State (8–3)	Ohio State (8–3)	Iowa (9–3)	14.
15.	Georgia	SMU (1–0)	Florida (1–0–1)	Florida (2–0–1)	Miami (FL) (3–1)	Iowa (3–1)	Oklahoma (3–2)	Maryland (5–1)	BYU (6–1)	Iowa (6–2)	West Virginia (7–2)	Washington (8–2)	Boston College (8–2)	Pittsburgh (8–2–1)	Pittsburgh (8–2–1)	Alabama (8–4)	15.
16.	Iowa	Iowa (0–0)	Washington (1–0)	Pittsburgh (2–0)	LSU (2–1)	Maryland (3–1) т	Maryland (4–1)	Oklahoma (4–2)	Ohio State (5–2)	Boston College (6–1)	Alabama (6–2)	Alabama (7–2)	Pittsburgh (8–2–1)	Maryland (8–3)	Air Force (9–2) т	West Virginia (9–3)	16.
17.	Maryland	Maryland (0–0)	Maryland (1–0)	Michigan (1–1)	Florida State (2–1)	Washington (3–1) т	Washington (4–1)	Ohio State (4–2)	Iowa (5–2)	West Virginia (6–2)	Clemson (7–1–1)	Pittsburgh (8–2)	Maryland (8–3)	Air Force (9–2)	Maryland (8–3) т	UCLA (7–4–1)	17.
18.	Washington	Florida (1–0)	SMU (2–0)	SMU (2–0)	Washington (2–1)	Arizona State (3–0–1)	Arizona State (3–0–1)	BYU (5–1)	Alabama (4–2)	Notre Dame (6–2)	Washington (7–2)	Boston College (7–2)	Air Force (8–2)	West Virginia (8–3)	West Virginia (8–3)	Pittsburgh (8–3–1)	18.
19.	SMU	Washington (0–0)	Pittsburgh (2–0)	Boston College (3–0)	Maryland (2–1)	Illinois (3–1)	Illinois (4–1)	Arizona (5–1–1)	Boston College (5–1) т	Alabama (5–2)	North Carolina (7–2)	Missouri (7–3)	West Virginia (8–3)	Alabama (7–3)	East Carolina (8–3)	Boston College (9–3)	19.
20.	UCLA	Penn State (0–1)	West Virginia (2–0)	Florida State (2–1)	Arizona State (2–0–1)	BYU (3–1)	BYU (4–1)	Alabama (4–2)	Notre Dame (5–2) т	Washington (6–2)	Pittsburgh (7–2)	Maryland (7–3)	East Carolina (8–3)	East Carolina (8–3)	Oklahoma (8–4) т Baylor (7–3–1) т	East Carolina (8–3)	20.
	Preseason Aug 28	Week 1 Sep 5	Week 2 Sep 12	Week 3 Sep 19	Week 4 Sep 26	Week 5 Oct 3	Week 6 Oct 10	Week 7 Oct 17	Week 8 Oct 24	Week 9 Oct 31	Week 10 Nov 7	Week 11 Nov 14	Week 12 Nov 21	Week 13 Nov 28	Week 14 Dec 5	Week 15 (Final) Jan 3	
		Dropped: UCLA	Dropped: LSU; Penn State	Dropped: Maryland	Dropped: USC; Notre Dame; Pittsburgh; Boston College	Dropped: LSU; Florida State	None	None	Dropped: Arizona State; Arizona	None	Dropped: Oklahoma; Notre Dame	Dropped: North Carolina	Dropped: Washington; Missouri	None	Dropped: Alabama	Dropped: Maryland; Baylor; Oklahoma	

== Coaches Poll ==
Clemson, USC, and Arizona were on probation by the NCAA during the 1983 season; they were therefore ineligible to receive votes in the Coaches Poll.

	Preseason Aug 28	Week 1 Sep 5	Week 2 Sep 12	Week 3 Sep 19	Week 4 Sep 26	Week 5 Oct 3	Week 6 Oct 10	Week 7 Oct 17	Week 8 Oct 24	Week 9 Oct 31	Week 10 Nov 7	Week 11 Nov 14	Week 12 Nov 21	Week 13 Nov 28	Week 14 Dec 5	Week 15 (Final) Jan 3	
1.	Nebraska (18)	Nebraska (1–0) (32)	Nebraska (2–0) (36)	Nebraska (3–0) (39)	Nebraska (4–0) (40)	Nebraska (5–0) (42)	Nebraska (6–0) (38)	Nebraska (7–0) (38)	Nebraska (8–0) (38)	Nebraska (9–0) (38)	Nebraska (10–0) (38)	Nebraska (11–0) (40)	Nebraska (11–0) (39)	Nebraska (12–0) (33)	Nebraska (12–0) (31)	Miami (FL) (11–1) (30)	1.
2.	Texas (7)	Texas (0–0) (2)	Oklahoma (1–0) (2)	Texas (1–0)	Texas (2–0)	Texas (3–0)	Texas (4–0) (3)	Texas (5–0) (4)	Texas (6–0) (4)	Texas (7–0) (3)	Texas (8–0) (2)	Texas (9–0) (1)	Texas (10–0) (1)	Texas (11–0) (2)	Texas (11–0) (3)	Nebraska (12–1) (6)	2.
3.	Auburn (3)	Auburn (0–0) (1)	Texas (0–0)	Ohio State (2–0) (1)	Iowa (3–0)	Alabama (4–0)	North Carolina (6–0)	North Carolina (7–0)	North Carolina (7–0)	Auburn (7–1)	Auburn (8–1)	Auburn (9–1)	Auburn (9–1)	Auburn (9–1)	Auburn (10–1)	Auburn (11–1) (4)	3.
4.	Penn State (3)	Oklahoma (0–0) (2)	Auburn (1–0)	North Carolina (3–0)	Alabama (3–0)	North Carolina (5–0)	West Virginia (5–0)	West Virginia (6–0)	Florida (6–0–1)	Georgia (7–0–1)	Georgia (8–0–1)	Miami (FL) (10–1)	Miami (FL) (10–1)	Miami (FL) (10–1)	Miami (FL) (10–1)	Georgia (10–1–1)	4.
5.	Oklahoma (6)	Michigan (0–0)	Notre Dame (1–0) (1)	Alabama (2–0)	North Carolina (4–0)	West Virginia (5–0)	Florida (5–0–1)	Auburn (5–1)	Auburn (6–1)	Miami (FL) (8–1)	Miami (FL) (9–1)	Illinois (9–1)	Illinois (10–1)	Illinois (10–1)	Illinois (10–1)	Texas (11–1) (1)	5.
6.	Ohio State	Ohio State (0–0)	Ohio State (1–0)	Iowa (2–0)	West Virginia (4–0)	Florida (4–0–1)	Georgia (4–0–1)	Florida (5–0–1)	Georgia (6–0–1)	Illinois (7–1)	Illinois (8–1)	SMU (8–1)	SMU (9–1)	SMU (10–1)	SMU (10–1)	Florida (9–2–1)	6.
7.	Florida State	Georgia (1–0)	Georgia (1–0)	Washington (2–0)	Oklahoma (2–1)	Oklahoma (3–1)	Ohio State (4–1)	Georgia (5–0–1)	Miami (FL) (7–1)	Maryland (7–1)	SMU (7–1)	Georgia (8–1–1)	Georgia (8–1–1)	Georgia (9–1–1)	Georgia (9–1–1)	BYU (11–1)	7.
8.	Notre Dame (2)	North Carolina (1–0)	North Carolina (2–0)	West Virginia (3–0)	Georgia (2–0–1)	Georgia (3–0–1)	Auburn (4–1)	SMU (5–0)	Michigan (6–1)	SMU (6–1)	Michigan (7–2)	Michigan (8–2)	Michigan (9–2)	Michigan (9–2)	Michigan (9–2)	Ohio State (9–3)	8.
9.	Michigan	Notre Dame (0–0)	Florida State (2–0)	Pittsburgh (2–0)	Florida (3–0–1)	Ohio State (3–1)	SMU (5–0)	Miami (FL) (6–1)	Illinois (6–1)	North Carolina (7–1)	Iowa (7–2)	BYU (9–1)	BYU (10–1)	BYU (10–1)	BYU (10–1)	Michigan (9–3)	9.
10.	North Carolina т	LSU (0–0)	Michigan (1–0)	Oklahoma (1–1)	Auburn (2–1)	Auburn (2–1)	Alabama (4–1)	Michigan (5–1)	Maryland (6–1)	Florida (6–1–1)	BYU (8–1)	Ohio State (8–2)	Iowa (9–2)	Iowa (9–2)	Iowa (9–2)	Illinois (10–2)	10.
11.	LSU т	Pittsburgh (1–0)	Alabama (1–0)	Georgia (1–0–1)	Ohio State (2–1)	Miami (FL) (4–1)	Michigan (4–1)	Illinois (5–1)	Washington (6–1)	Oklahoma (6–2)	Ohio State (7–2)	Iowa (8–2)	Florida (7–2–1)	Florida (8–2–1)	Florida (8–2–1)	SMU (10–2)	11.
12.	UCLA	Florida (1–0)	Iowa (1–0)	SMU (2–0)	SMU (3–0)	SMU (4–0)	Miami (FL) (5–1)	Iowa (5–1)	SMU (5–1)	BYU (7–1)	Boston College (7–1)	Florida (7–2–1)	Alabama (7–2)	Boston College (9–2)	Boston College (9–2)	Alabama (8–4)	12.
13.	Georgia (1)	Florida State (1–0)	Pittsburgh (2–0)	Florida (2–0–1)	LSU (2–1)	Michigan (3–1)	Iowa (4–1)	Maryland (5–1)	West Virginia (6–1)	Boston College (6–1)	Florida (6–2–1)	Pittsburgh (8–2)	Ohio State (8–3)	Ohio State (8–3)	Ohio State (8–3)	UCLA (7–4–1)	13.
14.	Alabama	Alabama (0–0)	West Virginia (2–0)	Auburn (1–1)	Michigan (2–1)	Iowa (3–1)	Illinois (4–1)	Arizona State (4–0–1)	Oklahoma (5–2)	Iowa (6–2)	Pittsburgh (7–2)	Washington (7–2)	Pittsburgh (8–2–1)	Pittsburgh (8–2–1)	Pittsburgh (8–2–1)	Iowa (9–3)	14.
15.	Pittsburgh	West Virginia (1–0)	Florida (1–0–1)	Boston College (3–0)	Miami (FL) (3–1)	Maryland (3–1)	Maryland (4–1)	Washington (5–1)	BYU (6–1)	Ohio State (6–2)	West Virginia (7–2)	West Virginia (8–2)	Boston College (8–2)	Maryland (8–3)	Maryland (8–3)	Air Force (10–2)	15.
16.	Washington	SMU (0–0)	Washington (1–0)	Notre Dame (1–1)	Maryland (2–1)	Arizona State (3–0–1)	Arizona State (3–0–1)	BYU (5–1)	Ohio State (5–2)	Michigan (6–2)	Alabama (6–2)	Alabama (7–2)	Oklahoma (7–3)	Air Force (8–2)	Air Force (9–2)	West Virginia (9–3)	16.
17.	SMU	Iowa (0–0)	SMU (2–0)	Michigan (1–1)	Arizona State (2–0–1)	Illinois (3–1)	Oklahoma (3–2)	Oklahoma (4–2)	Iowa (5–2)	Alabama (5–2)	Maryland (7–2)	Missouri (7–3)	Maryland (8–3)	Baylor (7–3–1)	Baylor (7–3–1)	Penn State (8–4–1)	17.
18.	Arizona State	Arizona State (0–0)	Arizona State (1–0)	Arkansas (2–0)	Kentucky (4–0)	Washington (3–1)	Washington (4–1)	Ohio State (4–2)	Boston College (5–1)	Notre Dame (6–2)	North Carolina (7–2)	Baylor (7–2–1)	Air Force (8–2)	Virginia Tech (9–2)	Virginia Tech (9–2)	Oklahoma State (8–4)	18.
19.	Miami (FL)	Penn State (0–1)	Maryland (1–0)	Arizona State (1–0–1)	Washington (2–1)	BYU (3–1)	BYU (4–1)	Pittsburgh (4–2)	Alabama (4–2)	Pittsburgh (6–2)	Tennessee (6–2)	Boston College (7–2)	Baylor (7–3–1)	West Virginia (8–3)	West Virginia (8–3)	Pittsburgh (8–3–1)	19.
20.	Maryland т Iowa т	Maryland (0–0)	Boston College (2–0)	Michigan State (2–0)	Pittsburgh (2–1)	Oklahoma State (4–0)	Oklahoma State (4–1)	Alabama (4–2) т; Boston College (5–1) т	Pittsburgh (5–2)	West Virginia (6–2)	Washington (7–2)	Oklahoma (7–3)	Virginia Tech (9–2)	Oklahoma (7–4)	Oklahoma (8–4)	Boston College (9–3)	20.
	Preseason Aug 28	Week 1 Sep 5	Week 2 Sep 12	Week 3 Sep 19	Week 4 Sep 26	Week 5 Oct 3	Week 6 Oct 10	Week 7 Oct 17	Week 8 Oct 24	Week 9 Oct 31	Week 10 Nov 7	Week 11 Nov 14	Week 12 Nov 21	Week 13 Nov 28	Week 14 Dec 5	Week 15 (Final) Jan 3	
		Dropped: Washington; Miami (FL)	Dropped: LSU; Penn State	Dropped: Florida State; Maryland	Dropped: Boston College; Notre Dame; Arkansas; Michigan State	Dropped: LSU; Kentucky; Pittsburgh	None	Dropped: Oklahoma State	Dropped: Arizona State	Dropped: Washington	Dropped: Oklahoma; Notre Dame	Dropped: Maryland; North Carolina; Tennessee	Dropped: Washington; West Virginia; Missouri	Dropped: Alabama	None	Dropped: Maryland; Baylor; Oklahoma	
