= 1983–84 NCAA football bowl games =

College football postseason game series

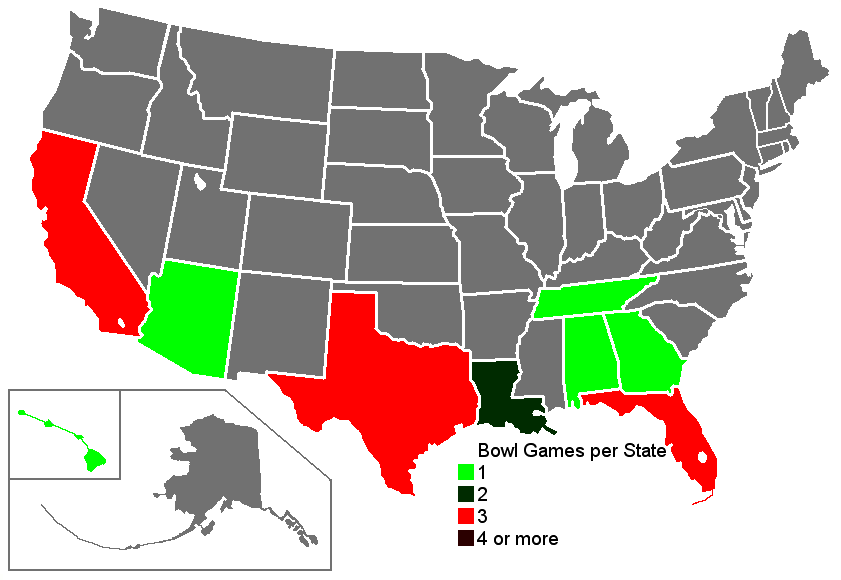
- Number of bowl games per state.
- Season: 1983
- Regular season: September 3–December 3
- Number of bowls: 16
- Bowl games: December 10, 1983 – January 2, 1984
- National Championship: 1984 Orange Bowl
- Location of Championship: Miami Orange Bowl, Miami, Florida
- Champions: Miami Hurricanes
Bowl record by conference
| Conference | Bowls | Record | Number of teams in final AP poll |
| Independents | 7 | 5–2 (0.714) | 5 |
| SEC | 7 | 5–2 (0.714) | 4 |
| Big Ten | 4 | 1–3 (0.250) | 4 |
| Big Eight | 3 | 1–2 (0.333) | 1 |
| SWC | 3 | 0–3 (0.000) | 2 |
| WAC | 2 | 2–0 (1.000) | 2 |
| Pac-10 | 2 | 1–1 (0.500) | 1 |
| ACC | 2 | 0–2 (0.000) | 1 |
| MAC | 1 | 1–0 (1.000) | 0 |
| Big West | 1 | 0–1 (0.000) | 0 |

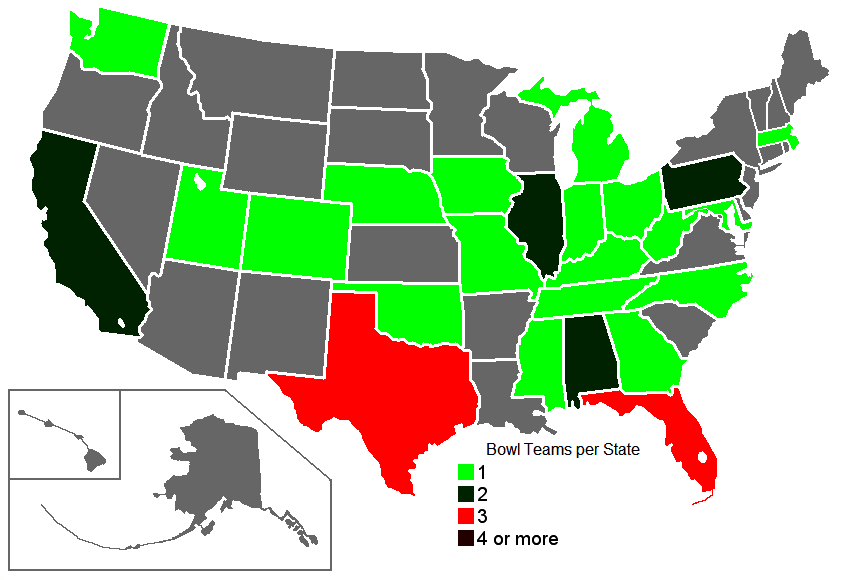
Number of bowl teams per state.

The 1983–84 NCAA football bowl games featured 16 games starting early in December and ending on January 2, 1984. The Tangerine Bowl was renamed the Florida Citrus Bowl.

== Bowl games ==
NOTE: Rankings used are the final regular season AP Rankings whenever noted

| Date | Game | Site | Result | Ref. |
|---|---|---|---|---|
| Dec 10 | Independence Bowl | Independence Stadium; Shreveport, LA | (16) Air Force Falcons 9, Ole Miss 3 | |
| Dec 17 | California Bowl | Bulldog Stadium; Fresno, CA | Northern Illinois Huskies 20, Cal State Fullerton 13 | |
| Dec 17 | Florida Citrus Bowl | Florida Citrus Bowl; Orlando, FL | (16) Maryland Terrapins 23, Tennessee Volunteers 30 | |
| Dec 22 | Hall of Fame Classic | Legion Field; Birmingham, AL | (18) West Virginia Mountaineers 20, Kentucky Wildcats 16 | |
| Dec 23 | Holiday Bowl | Jack Murphy Stadium; San Diego, CA | (9) BYU Cougars 21, Missouri Tigers 17 | |
| Dec 24 | Sun Bowl | Sun Bowl; El Paso, TX | Alabama Crimson Tide 28, (6) SMU Mustangs 7 | |
| Dec 26 | Aloha Bowl | Aloha Stadium; Honolulu, HI | Penn State Nittany Lions 13, Washington Huskies 10 | |
| Dec 29 | Liberty Bowl | Liberty Bowl Memorial Stadium; Memphis, TN | (13) Boston College 18, Notre Dame Fighting Irish 19 | |
| Dec 30 | Gator Bowl | Gator Bowl Stadium; Jacksonville, FL | (10) Iowa Hawkeyes 6, (11) Florida Gators 14 | |
| Dec 30 | Peach Bowl | Atlanta-Fulton County Stadium; Atlanta, GA | North Carolina Tar Heels 3, Florida State Seminoles 28 | |
| Dec 31 | Astro-Bluebonnet Bowl | Astrodome; Houston, TX | Oklahoma State Cowboys 24, (20) Baylor Bears 14 | |
| Jan 2 | Sugar Bowl | Louisiana Superdome; New Orleans, LA | (3) Auburn 9, (8) Michigan Wolverines 7 | |
| Jan 2 | Cotton Bowl | Cotton Bowl; Dallas, TX | (7) Georgia Bulldogs 10, (2) Texas Longhorns 9 | |
| Jan 2 | Orange Bowl | Orange Bowl; Miami, FL | (1) Nebraska Cornhuskers 30, (5) Miami Hurricanes 31 | |
| Jan 2 | Fiesta Bowl | Sun Devil Stadium; Tempe, AZ | (14) Ohio State Buckeyes 28, (15) Pittsburgh Panthers 23 | |
| Jan 2 | Rose Bowl | Rose Bowl; Pasadena, CA | UCLA Bruins 45, (4) Illinois Fighting Illini 9 | |

== Final rankings ==
=== AP Poll ===
1. Miami (FL)
2. Nebraska
3. Auburn
4. Georgia
5. Texas
6. Florida
7. BYU
8. Michigan
9. Ohio State
10. Illinois
11. Clemson
12. SMU
13. Air Force
14. Iowa
15. Alabama
16. West Virginia
17. UCLA
18. Pittsburgh
19. Boston College
20. East Carolina

=== Coaches' Poll ===
1. Miami (FL)
2. Nebraska
3. Auburn
4. Georgia
5. Texas
6. Florida
7. BYU
8. Ohio State
9. Michigan
10. Illinois
11. SMU
12. Alabama
13. UCLA
14. Iowa
15. Air Force
16. West Virginia
17. Penn State
18. Oklahoma State
19. Pittsburgh
20. Boston College

- Clemson was on probation by the NCAA during the 1983 season; they were therefore ineligible to receive votes in the Coaches' Poll
