= List of Kentucky Wildcats football seasons =

The Kentucky Wildcats football team competes in the National Collegiate Athletic Association (NCAA) Division I Football Bowl Subdivision (FBS) representing the University of Kentucky in Lexington, Kentucky. The following is a complete list of seasons completed by the team.

== Seasons ==
Year	Team	Overall	Conference	Standing	Bowl/playoffs	Coaches^{#}	AP^{°}
Independent (1881–1891)
1881	Kentucky State College	1–2					
1882–90	No team						
1891	Kentucky State College	1–1					
A. M. Miller (Independent) (1892)
1892	Kentucky State College	2–4–1					
John A. Thompson (Independent) (1893)
1893	Kentucky State College	5–2–1					
W. P. Finney (Independent) (1894)
1894	Kentucky State College	5–1					
Charles B. Mason (Independent) (1895)
1895	Kentucky State College	4–5					
Dudley Short (Southern Intercollegiate Athletic Association) (1896)
1896	Kentucky State College	3–6	1–1	T–5th			
Lyman Eaton (Southern Intercollegiate Athletic Association) (1897)
1897	Kentucky State College	2–4	0–2	12th			
W. R. Bass (Southern Intercollegiate Athletic Association) (1898–1899)
1898	Kentucky State College	7–0	0–0	N/A			
1899	Kentucky State College	5–2–2	0–1	T–14th			
William H. Kiler (Southern Intercollegiate Athletic Association) (1900–1901)
1900	Kentucky State College	4–6	0–0	N/A			
1901	Kentucky State College	2–6–1	0–2	11th			
E.W. McLeod (Southern Intercollegiate Athletic Association) (1902)
1902	Kentucky State College	3–5–1	0–2	17th			
Jack Wright (Southern Intercollegiate Athletic Association) (1903)
1903	Kentucky State College	7–1	0–0	N/A			
Fred Schacht (Southern Intercollegiate Athletic Association) (1904)
1904	Kentucky State College	9–1	2–0	3rd			
Fred Schacht (Independent) (1905)
1905	Kentucky State College	6–3–1					
J. White Guyn (Independent) (1906–1908)
1906	Kentucky State College	4–3					
1907	Kentucky State College	9–1–1					
1908	Kentucky State College	4–3					
Edwin Sweetland (Southern Intercollegiate Athletic Association) (1909–1910)
1909	Kentucky State College	9–1					
1910	Kentucky State College	7–2					
Prentiss Douglass (Southern Intercollegiate Athletic Association) (1911)
1911	Kentucky State College	7–3	1–1	T–7th			
Edwin Sweetland (Southern Intercollegiate Athletic Association) (1912)
1912	Kentucky State College	7–2	1–0				
Alpha Brumage (Southern Intercollegiate Athletic Association) (1913–1914)
1913	Kentucky	6–2	0–1	16th			
1914	Kentucky	5–3	1–1	T–8th			
John J. Tigert (Southern Intercollegiate Athletic Association) (1915–1916)
1915	Kentucky	6–1–1	2–1–1	9th			
1916	Kentucky	4–1–2	2–1–2	10th			
Stanley A. Boles (Independent) (1917)
1917	Kentucky	3–5–1					
Thomas Andrew Gill (Independent) (1918)
1918	Kentucky	2–1					
Thomas Andrew Gill (Southern Intercollegiate Athletic Association) (1919)
1919	Kentucky	3–4–1	3–1–1	5th			
William Juneau (Southern Intercollegiate Athletic Association) (1920–1921)
1920	Kentucky	3–4–1	0–3–1	19th			
1921	Kentucky	4–3–1	1–3–1	20th			
William Juneau (Southern Conference) (1922)
1922	Kentucky	6–3	1–2	T–11th			
Jack Winn (Southern Conference) (1923)
1923	Kentucky	4–3–2	0–2–2	17th			
Fred J. Murphy (Southern Conference) (1924–1926)
1924	Kentucky	4–5	2–3	T–14th			
1925	Kentucky	6–3	4–2	7th			
1926	Kentucky	2–6–1	1–4–1	T–19th			
Harry Gamage (Southern Conference) (1927–1932)
1927	Kentucky	3–6–1	1–5	21st			
1928	Kentucky	4–3–1	2–2–1	T–9th			
1929	Kentucky	6–1–1	3–1–1	6th			
1930	Kentucky	5–3	4–3	T–10th			
1931	Kentucky	5–2–2	4–2–2	6th			
1932	Kentucky	4–5	4–5	12th			
Harry Gamage (Southeastern Conference) (1933)
1933	Kentucky	5–5	2–3	T–9th			
Chet A. Wynne (Southeastern Conference) (1934–1937)
1934	Kentucky	5–5	1–3	9th			
1935	Kentucky	5–4	3–3	T–6th			
1936	Kentucky	6–4	1–3	10th			
1937	Kentucky	4–6	0–5	12th			
Albert D. Kirwan (Southeastern Conference) (1938–1944)
1938	Kentucky	2–7	0–4	12th			
1939	Kentucky	6–2–1	2–2–1	T–5th			
1940	Kentucky	5–3–2	1–2–2	9th			
1941	Kentucky	5–4	0–4	12th			
1942	Kentucky	3–6–1	0–5	T–11th			
1943	No team						
1944	Kentucky	3–6	1–5	9th			
Bernie Shively (Southeastern Conference) (1945)
1945	Kentucky	2–8	0–5	12th			
Bear Bryant (Southeastern Conference) (1946–1953)
1946	Kentucky	7–3	2–3	8th			
1947	Kentucky	8–3	2–3	T–9th	W Great Lakes		
1948	Kentucky	5–3–2	1–3–1	9th			
1949	Kentucky	9–3	4–1	2nd	L Orange		11
1950	Kentucky	11–1	5–1	1st	W Sugar	7	7
1951	Kentucky	8–4	3–3	5th	W Cotton	17	15
1952	Kentucky	5–4–2	1–3–2	9th		19	20
1953	Kentucky	7–2–1	4–1–1	3rd		15	16
Blanton Collier (Southeastern Conference) (1954–1961)
1954	Kentucky	7–3	5–2	T–3rd			
1955	Kentucky	6–3–1	3–3–1	T–7th			
1956	Kentucky	6–4	4–4	6th			
1957	Kentucky	3–7	1–7	12th			
1958	Kentucky	5–4–1	3–4–1	T–6th			
1959	Kentucky	4–6	1–6	10th			
1960	Kentucky	5–4–1	2–4–1	9th			
1961	Kentucky	5–5	2–4	8th			
Charlie Bradshaw (Southeastern Conference) (1962–1968)
1962	Kentucky	3–5–2	2–3–1	T–7th			
1963	Kentucky	3–6–1	0–5–1	11th			
1964	Kentucky	5–5	4–2	T–2nd			
1965	Kentucky	6–4	3–3	T–6th			
1966	Kentucky	3–6–1	2–4	7th			
1967	Kentucky	2–8	1–6	8th			
1968	Kentucky	3–7	0–7	10th			
John Ray (Southeastern Conference) (1969–1972)
1969	Kentucky	2–8	1–6	9th			
1970	Kentucky	2–9	0–7	10th			
1971	Kentucky	3–8	1–6	T–8th			
1972	Kentucky	3–8	2–5	T–7th			
Fran Curci (Southeastern Conference) (1973–1981)
1973	Kentucky	5–6	3–4	T–5th			
1974	Kentucky	6–5	3–3	T–4th			
1975	Kentucky	2–8–1	0–6	10th			
1976	Kentucky	9–3 (Note: Mississippi State forfeited their 1976 win over Kentucky, giving Kentucky an official 5–1 conference record and a share of the SEC title with Georgia.)	5–1	T–3rd	W Peach	19	18
1977	Kentucky	10–1	6–0	T–1st (Note: The Wildcats finished conference play undefeated but due to NCAA probation were not eligible for a share of the SEC championship, postseason play, and the coaches poll.)	Ineligible		6
1978	Kentucky	4–6–1	2–4	T–7th			
1979	Kentucky	5–6	3–3	T–5th			
1980	Kentucky	3–8	1–5	8th			
1981	Kentucky	3–8	2–4	T–6th			
Jerry Claiborne (Southeastern Conference) (1982–1989)
1982	Kentucky	0–10–1	0–6	T–8th			
1983	Kentucky	6–5–1	2–4	4th	L Hall of Fame Classic		
1984	Kentucky	9–3	3–3	T–4th	W Hall of Fame Classic	19	19
1985	Kentucky	5–6	1–5	7th			
1986	Kentucky	5–5–1	2–4	T–4th			
1987	Kentucky	5–6	1–5	T–7th			
1988	Kentucky	5–6	2–5	T–8th			
1989	Kentucky	6–5	2–5	T–7th			
Bill Curry (Southeastern Conference) (1990–1996)
1990	Kentucky	4–7	3–4	6th			
1991	Kentucky	3–8	0–7	10th			
1992	Kentucky	4–7	2–6	5th (Eastern)			
1993	Kentucky	6–6	4–4	3rd (Eastern)	L Peach		
1994	Kentucky	1–10	0–8	6th (Eastern)			
1995	Kentucky	4–7	2–6	5th (Eastern)			
1996	Kentucky	4–7	3–5	4th (Eastern)			
Hal Mumme (Southeastern Conference) (1997–2000)
1997	Kentucky	5–6	2–6	5th (Eastern)			
1998	Kentucky	7–5	4–4	4th (Eastern)	L Outback		
1999	Kentucky	6–6	4–4	4th (Eastern)	L Music City		
2000	Kentucky	2–9	0–8	6th (Eastern)			
Guy Morriss (Southeastern Conference) (2001–2002)
2001	Kentucky	2–9	1–7	5th (Eastern)			
2002	Kentucky	7–5	3–5	T–4th (Eastern)			
Rich Brooks (Southeastern Conference) (2003–2009)
2003	Kentucky	4–8	1–7	T–5th (Eastern)			
2004	Kentucky	2–9	1–7	T–5th (Eastern)			
2005	Kentucky	3–8	2–6	6th (Eastern)			
2006	Kentucky	8–5	4–4	T–3rd (Eastern)	W Music City		
2007	Kentucky	8–5	3–5	T–4th (Eastern)	W Music City		
2008	Kentucky	7–6	2–6	6th (Eastern)	W Liberty		
2009	Kentucky	7–6	3–5	T–4th (Eastern)	L Music City		
Joker Phillips (Southeastern Conference) (2010–2012)
2010	Kentucky	6–7	2–6	5th (Eastern)	L BBVA Compass		
2011	Kentucky	5–7	2–6	5th (Eastern)			
2012	Kentucky	2–10	0–8	7th (Eastern)			
Mark Stoops (Southeastern Conference) (2013–2025)
2013	Kentucky	2–10	0–8	7th (Eastern)			
2014	Kentucky	5–7	2–6	6th (Eastern)			
2015	Kentucky	5–7	2–6	T–4th (Eastern)			
2016	Kentucky	7–6	4–4	T–2nd (Eastern)	L TaxSlayer		
2017	Kentucky	7–6	4–4	T–3rd (Eastern)	L Music City		
2018	Kentucky	10–3	5–3	T–2nd (Eastern)	W Citrus	11	12
2019	Kentucky	8–5	3–5	T–4th (Eastern)	W Belk		
2020	Kentucky	5–6	4–6	4th (Eastern)	W Gator		
2021	Kentucky	10–3*	5–3*	2nd (Eastern)	W* Citrus	15	18
2022	Kentucky	7–6	3–5	T–4th (Eastern)	L Music City		
2023	Kentucky	7–6	3–5	T–4th (Eastern)	L Gator		
2024	Kentucky	4–8	1–7	15th			
2025	Kentucky	5–7	2–6	T–11th			
Will Stein (Southeastern Conference) (2026–present)
2026	Kentucky	7-1	5-1	1st		8	9
Total:		667–663–44					
National championship Conference title Conference division title or championship game berth
^{†}Indicates Bowl Coalition, Bowl Alliance, BCS, or CFP / New Years' Six bowl.; ^{#}Rankings from final Coaches Poll.

- Kentucky vacated all 2021 wins in August 2024.
