= 1983 Auburn Tigers football team =

American college football season

1983 Auburn Tigers football

National champion (Billingsley, CFRA, The New York Times, ARGH) National champion (Rothman, Sagarin) SEC champion Sugar Bowl champion

Sugar Bowl, W 9–7 vs Michigan
- Conference: Southeastern Conference

Ranking
- Coaches: No. 3
- AP: No. 3
- Record: 11–1 (6–0 SEC)
- Head coach: Pat Dye (3rd season)
- Offensive coordinator: Jack Crowe (2nd season)
- Offensive scheme: Wishbone
- Defensive coordinator: Frank Orgel (3rd season)
- Base defense: 5–2
- Home stadium: Jordan–Hare Stadium

1983 Southeastern Conference football standings
| | Conf. | | | | | Overall |
| Team | W | | L | | T | W | | L | | T |
|---|---|---|---|---|---|---|---|---|---|---|
| No. 3 Auburn $ | 6 | – | 0 | – | 0 | 11 | – | 1 | – | 0 |
| No. 4 Georgia | 5 | – | 1 | – | 0 | 10 | – | 1 | – | 1 |
| No. 6 Florida | 4 | – | 2 | – | 0 | 9 | – | 2 | – | 1 |
| Tennessee | 4 | – | 2 | – | 0 | 9 | – | 3 | – | 0 |
| No. 15 Alabama | 4 | – | 2 | – | 0 | 8 | – | 4 | – | 0 |
| Ole Miss | 4 | – | 2 | – | 0 | 6 | – | 6 | – | 0 |
| Kentucky | 2 | – | 4 | – | 0 | 6 | – | 5 | – | 1 |
| Mississippi State | 1 | – | 5 | – | 0 | 3 | – | 8 | – | 0 |
| LSU | 0 | – | 6 | – | 0 | 4 | – | 7 | – | 0 |
| Vanderbilt | 0 | – | 6 | – | 0 | 2 | – | 9 | – | 0 |
$ – Conference champion; Rankings from AP Poll

The 1983 Auburn Tigers football team represented Auburn University in the 1983 NCAA Division I-A football season. Coached by Pat Dye, the team finished the season with an 11–1 record and won their first Southeastern Conference (SEC) title since 1957. Playing the toughest schedule in the country, the team was named national champion by NCAA-designated major selectors of Billingsley, College Football Researchers Association, The New York Times, and ARGH, as well as Rothman and Sagarin.

The squad featured several star players who went on to long professional careers including Bo Jackson, Randy Campbell, Tommie Agee, Lionel James, Donnie Humphrey, Steve Wallace and Al Del Greco. Prior to the season, Dye became the first coach in the SEC to require players to take blood and urine tests for drugs. Also prior to the season, fullback Greg Pratt collapsed after making his required time in running tests and died a short time later.

The team capped an 11–1 season, with a 9–7 victory handing 2-loss #8 Michigan its third loss in the Sugar Bowl. Despite having lost to Texas by 13 points at home the Tigers ended ranked third in the final AP and the UPI Coaches' poll ahead of the 1-loss Longhorns as Miami jumped from 5th from the AP and 4th from the UPI Coaches' poll to claim the AP/UPI Coaches' National Championship award. Auburn had played the toughest schedule in the nation, including nine bowl teams, eight of which were ranked in the top 20 (five in the top ten), and two teams Auburn faced would compete against each other in the 1983 Florida Citrus Bowl (Tennessee won the game against Maryland 30–23).

== Schedule ==
| Date | Time | Opponent | Rank | Site | TV | Result | Attendance | Source |
|---|---|---|---|---|---|---|---|---|
| September 10 | | Southern Miss* | No. 4 | Jordan–Hare Stadium; Auburn, AL | | W 24–3 | 73,500 | |
| September 17 | 11:30 am | No. 3 Texas* | No. 5 | Jordan–Hare Stadium; Auburn, AL | CBS | L 7–20 | 73,500 | |
| September 24 | | at Tennessee | No. 11 | Neyland Stadium; Knoxville, TN (rivalry) | | W 37–14 | 95,185 | |
| October 1 | | Florida State* | No. 10 | Jordan–Hare Stadium; Auburn, AL | | W 27–24 | 75,625 | |
| October 8 | | at Kentucky | No. 7 | Commonwealth Stadium; Lexington, KY | | W 49–21 | 57,989 | |
| October 15 | | at Georgia Tech* | No. 5 | Grant Field; Atlanta, GA (rivalry) | | W 31–13 | 55,112 | |
| October 22 | | Mississippi State | No. 5 | Jordan–Hare Stadium; Auburn, AL | | W 28–13 | 71,500 | |
| October 29 | | No. 5 Florida | No. 4 | Jordan–Hare Stadium; Auburn, AL (rivalry) | CBS | W 28–21 | 75,700 | |
| November 5 | | No. 7 Maryland*^{†} | No. 3 | Jordan–Hare Stadium; Auburn, AL | | W 35–23 | 75,600 | |
| November 12 | 2:50 pm | at No. 4 Georgia | No. 3 | Sanford Stadium; Athens, GA (rivalry) | ABC | W 13–7 | 82,122 | |
| December 3 | 2:50 pm | vs. No. 19 Alabama | No. 3 | Legion Field; Birmingham, AL (Iron Bowl) | ABC | W 23–20 | 77,310 | |
| January 2, 1984 | 7:00 pm | vs. No. 8 Michigan* | No. 3 | Louisiana Superdome; New Orleans, LA (Sugar Bowl) | ABC | W 9–7 | 77,893 | |
*Non-conference game; ^{†}Homecoming; Rankings from AP Poll released prior to the game; All times are in Central time

== Rankings ==
Ranking movements Legend: ██ Increase in ranking ██ Decrease in ranking ( ) = First-place votes
| | Week | | | | | | | | | | | | | | | |
| Poll | Pre | 1 | 2 | 3 | 4 | 5 | 6 | 7 | 8 | 9 | 10 | 11 | 12 | 13 | 14 | Final |
|---|---|---|---|---|---|---|---|---|---|---|---|---|---|---|---|---|
| AP | 5 (2) | 4 (1) | 5 | 11 | 10 | 7 | 5 | 5 | 4 | 3 | 3 | 3 | 3 | 3 | 3 | 3 (7) |
| Coaches | 3 (3) | 3 (1) | 4 | 14 | 10 | 10 | 8 | 5 | 5 | 3 | 3 | 3 | 3 | 3 | 3 | 3 (4) |

== Game summaries ==
=== At Georgia ===
| Team | 1 | 2 | 3 | 4 | Total |
|---|---|---|---|---|---|
| • No. 3 Auburn | 7 | 6 | 0 | 0 | 13 |
| No. 4 Georgia | 0 | 0 | 0 | 7 | 7 |

- Date: November 12
- Location: Sanford Stadium
- Game attendance: 82,122
- Referee: Dick Burleson
- TV announcers (ABC): Keith Jackson and Frank Broyles

Scoring summary
| 1 | AUB | James 4 yard run (Del Greco kick) | AUB 7–0 |
| 2 | AUB | Del Greco 21 yard field goal | AUB 10–0 |
| 2 | AUB | Del Greco 41 yard field goal | AUB 13–0 |
| 4 | UGA | Archie 13 yard pass from Lastinger (Butler kick) | AUB 13–7 |

=== Vs. Alabama ===
| Team | 1 | 2 | 3 | 4 | Total |
|---|---|---|---|---|---|
| No. 19 Alabama | 0 | 14 | 6 | 0 | 20 |
| • No. 3 Auburn | 0 | 10 | 13 | 0 | 23 |

- Date: December 3
- Location: Legion Field, Birmingham, Alabama
- Game attendance: 77,310
- Game weather: 62 °F (17 °C), Cloudy with rain, Wind SE 10 mph (16 km/h)
- Referee: Johnny Cook
- TV announcers (ABC): Keith Jackson, Frank Broyles

Scoring summary
| 2 | | AUB | Bo Jackson 69-yard run (Al Del Greco kick) | AUB 7–0 |
| 2 | 11:42 | BAMA | Joey Jones 20-yard pass from Walter Lewis (Van Tiffin kick) | Tied 7–7 |
| 2 | 5:30 | AUB | Del Greco 29-yard field goal | AUB 10–7 |
| 2 | 0:46 | BAMA | Joe Carter 3-yard pass from Walter Lewis (Tiffin kick) | BAMA 14–10 |
| 3 | | AUB | Del Greco 26-yard field goal | BAMA 14–13 |
| 3 | | AUB | Del Greco 34-yard field goal | AUB 16–14 |
| 3 | 2:20 | BAMA | Ricky Moore 57-yard run (conversion failed) | BAMA 20–16 |
| 4 | 2:03 | AUB | Bo Jackson 71-yard run (Del Greco kick) | AUB 23–20 |

Sophomore Bo Jackson ran for 256 yards and 2 touchdowns as the Tigers won the SEC title outright. His long touchdown runs – 69 yards and 71 yards, respectively – bookended the day's scoring.

=== Vs. Michigan (Sugar Bowl) ===
| Team | 1 | 2 | 3 | 4 | Total |
|---|---|---|---|---|---|
| Michigan | 7 | 0 | 0 | 0 | 7 |
| • Auburn | 0 | 0 | 3 | 6 | 9 |

- Date: January 1
- Location: Louisiana Superdome, New Orleans
- Game attendance: 77,893
- Game weather: Indoors
- Referee: Dixon Holman (SWC)
- TV announcers (ABC): Keith Jackson, Frank Broyles

Scoring summary
| 1 | MICH | Steve Smith 4-yard run (Bergeron kick) | MICH 7–0 |
| 3 | AUB | Al Del Greco 31-yard field goal | MICH 7–3 |
| 4 | AUB | Del Greco 32-yard field goal | MICH 7–6 |
| 4 | AUB | Del Greco 19-yard field goal | AUB 9–7 |

== Roster ==
1983 Auburn Tigers football team roster
Players
Coaches
Offense

| Pos. | # | Name | Class |
|---|---|---|---|
| WR | 1 | Chris Woods | Sr |
| RB | 6 | Lionel James | Sr |
| RB | 8 | Terry Walker | Jr |
| QB | 10 | Pat Washington | So |
| WR | 11 | Clayton Beauford | Jr |
| QB | 14 | Randy Campbell | Sr |
| QB | 17 | Mike Mann | Jr |
| RB | 21 | Ed Graham | Jr |
| RB | 23 | Kyle Collins | So |
| RB | 25 | Tim Jessie | So |
| RB | 30 | Tommie Agee | So |
| RB | 33 | Alan Evans | So |
| RB | 34 | Bo Jackson | So |
| FB | 36 | Greg Pratt | Jr |
| RB | 38 | Collis Campbell | So |
| FB | 44 | Ron O'Neal | Jr |
| C | 52 | Ben Tamburello | Fr |
| C | 53 | Yann Cowart | Fr |
| C | 55 | Kirk Callaway | Jr |
| C | 59 | Brian Dunlaney | Sr |
| G | 60 | John Margadonna | Jr |
| OT | 62 | Steve Posey | Fr |
| G | 64 | Randy Stokes | So |
| OT | 65 | Jeff Ostrowski | Jr |
| G | 66 | Jeff Lott | So |
| OL | 67 | Marvin Arnold | So |
| OT | 68 | Bob Hix | Sr |
| OT | 69 | Rob Shuler | So |
| OT | 71 | Jay Jacobs | Jr |
| OT | 72 | Tracy Turner | Jr |
| G | 74 | David Jordan | Sr |
| OT | 76 | Pat Arrington | Sr |
| OT | 77 | Mark Aston | Jr |
| OL | 78 | Steve Wallace | So |
| OT | 80 | Alex Dudchock | Fr |
| TE | 82 | Jeff Parks | So |
| WR | 84 | Tommy Carroll | Sr |
| WR | 84 | Clay Johnson | Fr |
| TE | 85 | Ed West | Sr |
| TE | 87 | Ron Middleton | So |
| TE | | Barry Garber | So |
| FB | | Joel Gregg | So |
| WR | | Tommy Lanier | So |
| WR | | Jeff Marks | Fr |
| OT | | Terry Moore | So |
| G | | Matt Triplett | So |

Defense

| Pos. | # | Name | Class |
|---|---|---|---|
| CB | 2 | Chuck Clanton | Sr |
| CB | 22 | Danny Robinson | So |
| SS | 26 | Tommy Powell | Fr |
| CB | 27 | David King | Jr |
| FS | 31 | Vic Beasley | Jr |
| CB | 32 | Jonathan Robinson | Jr |
| LB | 37 | Chette Williams | Jr |
| LB | 41 | Pat Thomas | So |
| LB | 42 | Jeff Jackson | Sr |
| CB | 45 | Jimmie Warren | So |
| DB | 48 | Don Anderson | Jr |
| DB | 49 | Nat Ceasar | Jr |
| LB | 51 | Jim Bone | Jr |
| LB | 52 | Ben McCurdy | So |
| LB | 54 | Gregg Carr | Jr |
| DT | 60 | Terry Jones | So |
| NT | 61 | Dowe Aughtman | Sr |
| NG | 63 | James Wallace | Jr |
| NG | 67 | Jeff Neighbors | So |
| DT | 79 | Donnie Humphrey | Sr |
| DT | 88 | John Prudhomme | Sr |
| DE | 90 | Kevin Greene | Jr |
| DT | 91 | Ben Thomas | Jr |
| DE | 93 | Quency Williams | Sr |
| NG | 94 | Harold Hallman | Jr |
| DE | 95 | Gerald Robinson | So |
| DE | 95 | Ken Thomas | Jr |
| DE | 96 | John Dailey | Jr |
| DT | 98 | Joe Manning | Jr |
| DT | 98 | Gerald Williams | So |
| DT | 99 | Doug Smith | Sr |
| LB | | Jeff Bankston | Jr |
| DT | | Phillip Dembrowski | Jr |
| LB | | Robert Dowling | So |
| FS | | Freddie Jones | Sr |
| DB | | Scott Kunz | So |
| DE | | Pat Prichard | Jr |
| LB | | Mark Ressmeyer | Jr |
| FS | | Chris Taylor | Sr |
| LB | | Dale Tomaino | Fr |
| DE | | David Vinson | So |
| DE | | Neil Vinson | So |

Special teams

| Pos. | # | Name | Class |
|---|---|---|---|
| K | 3 | Al Del Greco | Sr |
| P | 5 | Lewis Colbert | So |
| P | 16 | Scott Selman | Sr |
| P | | Fred Murphy | So |
| K | | Rick Scussel | Jr |
| P | | Chike Ward | So |

Head coach

- Pat Dye

Coordinators/assistant coaches

- Larry Blakeney (assistant)
- Neil Callaway (offensive line)
- Bud Casey (assistant)
- Jack Crowe (offensive coordinator)
- James Daniel (offensive line)
- Wayne Hall (assistant)
- Frank Orgel (assistant)
- Bobby Wallace (defensive backs)
- Joe Whitt (assistant)
- Frank Young (assistant)

Legend

- (C) Team captain
- (S) Suspended
- (I) Ineligible
- Injured
- Redshirt

Roster
