= Sports rating system =

A sports rating system is a system that analyzes the results of sports competitions to provide ratings for each team or player. Common systems include polls of expert voters, crowdsourcing non-expert voters, betting markets, and computer systems. Ratings, or power ratings, are numerical representations of competitive strength, often directly comparable so that the game outcome between any two teams can be predicted. Rankings, or power rankings, can be directly provided (e.g., by asking people to rank teams), or can be derived by sorting each team's ratings and assigning an ordinal rank to each team, so that the highest rated team earns the #1 rank. Rating systems provide an alternative to traditional sports standings which are based on win–loss–tie ratios.

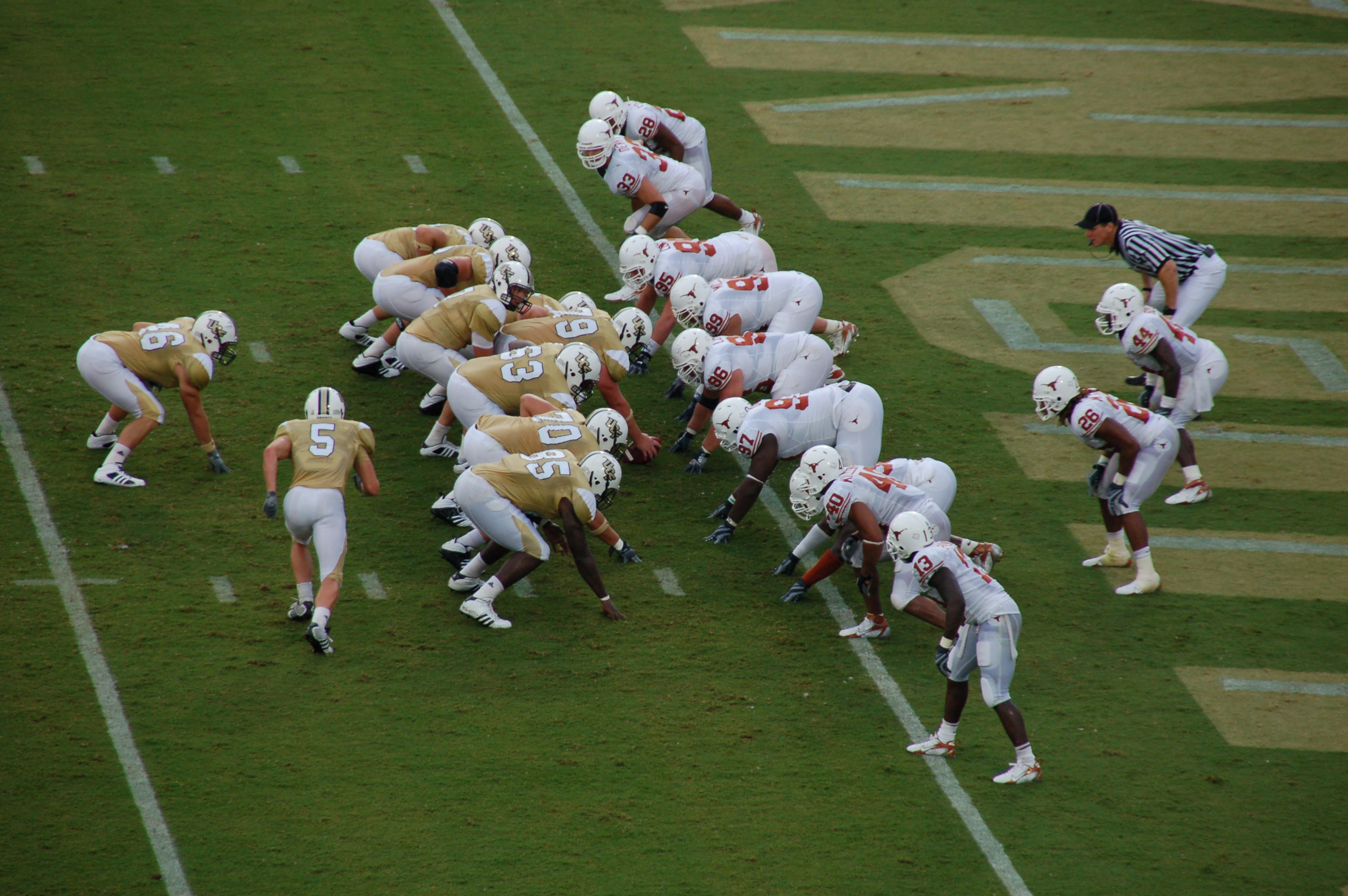
College football players in the United States

In the United States, the biggest use of sports ratings systems is to rate NCAA college football teams in Division I FBS, choosing teams to play in the College Football Playoff. Sports ratings systems are also used to help determine the field for the NCAA men's and women's basketball tournaments, men's professional golf tournaments, professional tennis tournaments, and NASCAR. They are often mentioned in discussions about the teams that could or should receive invitations to participate in certain contests, despite not earning the most direct entrance path (such as a league championship).

Computer rating systems can tend toward objectivity, without specific player, team, regional, or style bias. Ken Massey writes that an advantage of computer rating systems is that they can "objectively track all" 351 college basketball teams, while human polls "have limited value". Computer ratings are verifiable and repeatable, and are comprehensive, requiring assessment of all selected criteria. By comparison, rating systems relying on human polls include inherent human subjectivity; this may or may not be an attractive property depending on system needs.

== History ==
Sports ratings systems have been around for almost 80 years, when ratings were calculated on paper rather than by computer, as most are today. Some older computer systems still in use today include: Jeff Sagarin's systems, the New York Times system, and the Dunkel Index, which dates back to 1929. Before the advent of the college football playoff, the Bowl Championship Series championship game participants were determined by a combination of expert polls and computer systems.

== Theory ==
Sports ratings systems use a variety of methods for rating teams, but the most prevalent method is called a power rating. The power rating of a team is a calculation of the team's strength relative to other teams in the same league or division. The basic idea is to maximize the number of transitive relations in a given data set due to game outcomes. For example, if A defeats B and B defeats C, then one can safely say that A>B>C.

There are obvious problems with basing a system solely on wins and losses. For example, if C defeats A, then an intransitive relation is established (A > B > C > A) and a ranking violation will occur if this is the only data available. Scenarios such as this happen fairly regularly in sports—for example, in the 2005 NCAA Division I-A football season, Penn State beat Ohio State, Ohio State beat Michigan, and Michigan beat Penn State. To address these logical breakdowns, rating systems usually consider other criteria such as the game's score and where the match was held (for example, to assess a home field advantage). In most cases though, each team plays a sufficient number of other games during a given season, which lessens the overall effect of such violations.

From an academic perspective, the use of linear algebra and statistics are popular among many of the systems' authors to determine their ratings. Some academic work is published in forums like the MIT Sloan Sports Analytics Conference, others in traditional statistics, mathematics, psychology, and computer science journals.

If sufficient "inter-divisional" league play is not accomplished, teams in an isolated division may be artificially propped up or down in the overall ratings due to a lack of correlation to other teams in the overall league. This phenomenon is evident in systems that analyze historical college football seasons, such as when the top Ivy League teams of the 1970s, like Dartmouth, were calculated by some rating systems to be comparable with accomplished powerhouse teams of that era such as Nebraska, USC, and Ohio State. This conflicts with the subjective opinion that claims that while good in their own right, they were not nearly as good as those top programs. However, this may be considered a "pro" by non-BCS teams in Division I-A college football who point out that ratings systems have proven that their top teams belong in the same strata as the BCS teams. This is evidenced by the 2004 Utah team that went undefeated in the regular season and earned a BCS bowl bid due to the bump in their overall BCS ratings via the computer ratings component. They went on to play and defeat the Big East Conference champion Pittsburgh in the 2005 Fiesta Bowl by a score of 35–7. A related example occurred during the 2006 NCAA men's basketball tournament where George Mason were awarded an at-large tournament bid due to their regular season record and their RPI rating and rode that opportunity all the way to the Final Four.

Goals of some rating systems differ from one another. For example, systems may be crafted to provide a perfect retrodictive analysis of the games played to-date, while others are predictive and give more weight to future trends rather than past results. This results in the potential for misinterpretation of rating system results by people unfamiliar with these goals; for example, a rating system designed to give accurate point spread predictions for gamblers might be ill-suited for use in selecting teams most deserving to play in a championship game or tournament.

== Rating considerations ==
=== Home advantage ===
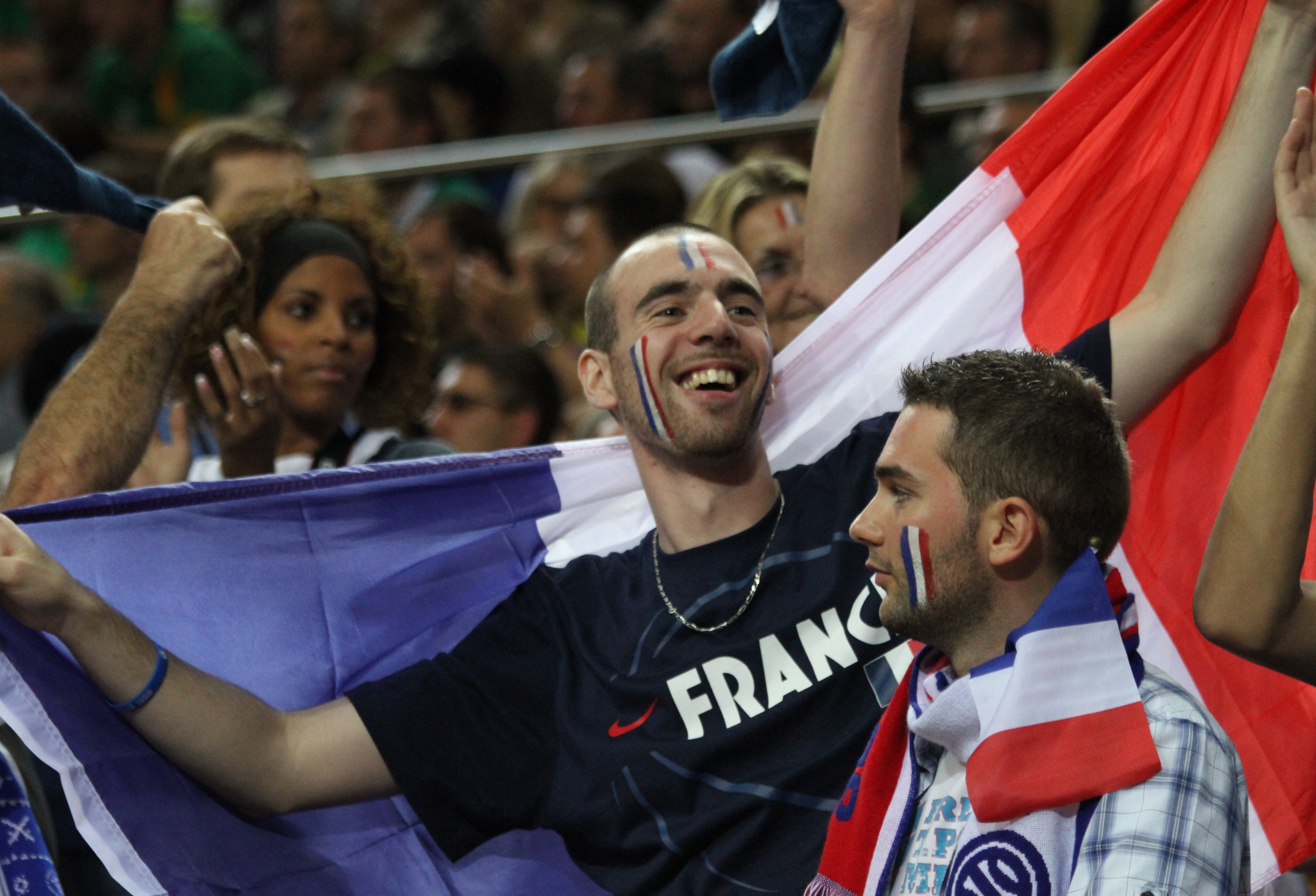
France national basketball team fans

When two teams of equal quality play, the team at home tends to win more often. The size of the effect changes based on the era of play, game type, season length, sport, even number of time zones crossed. But across all conditions, "simply playing at home increases the chances of winning." A win away from home is therefore seen more favorably than a win at home, because it was more challenging. Home advantage (which, for sports played on a pitch, is almost always called "home field advantage") is also based on the qualities of the individual stadium and crowd; the advantage in the NFL can be more than a 4-point difference from the stadium with the least advantage to the stadium with the most.

=== Strength of schedule ===
Strength of schedule refers to the quality of a team's opponents. A win against an inferior opponent is usually seen less favorably than a win against a superior opponent. Often teams in the same league, who are compared against each other for championship or playoff consideration, have not played the same opponents. Therefore, judging their relative win–loss records is complicated.

We looked beyond the record. The committee placed significant value on Oregon's quality of wins.

— College football playoff committee chairman Jeff Long, press conference, week 12 of the 2014 season, after ranking 9–1 Oregon above 9–0 Florida State

The college football playoff committee uses a limited strength-of-schedule algorithm that only considers opponents' records and opponents' opponents' records (much like RPI).

=== Points versus wins ===
A key dichotomy among sports rating systems lies in the representation of game outcomes. Some systems store final scores as ternary discrete events: wins, draws, and losses. Other systems record the exact final game score, then judge teams based on margin of victory. Rating teams based on margin of victory is often criticized as creating an incentive for coaches to run up the score, an "unsportsmanlike" outcome.

Still other systems choose a middle ground, reducing the marginal value of additional points as the margin of victory increases. Sagarin chose to clamp the margin of victory to a predetermined number. Other approaches include the use of a decay function, such as a logarithm or placement on a cumulative distribution function.

=== In-game information ===
Beyond points or wins, some system designers choose to include more granular information about the game. Examples include time of possession of the ball, individual statistics, and lead changes. Data about weather, injuries, or "throw-away" games near season's end may affect game outcomes but are difficult to model. "Throw-away games" are games where teams have already earned playoff slots and have secured their playoff seeding before the end of the regular season, and want to rest/protect their starting players by benching them for remaining regular season games. This usually results in unpredictable outcomes and may skew the outcome of rating systems.

=== Team composition ===
Teams often shift their composition between and within games, and players routinely get injured. Rating a team is often about rating a specific collection of players. Some systems assume parity among all members of the league, such as each team being built from an equitable pool of players via a draft or free agency system as is done in many major league sports such as the NFL, MLB, NBA, and NHL. This is certainly not the case in collegiate leagues such as Division I-A football or men's and women's basketball.

=== Cold start ===
At the beginning of a season, there have been no games from which to judge teams' relative quality. Solutions to the cold start problem often include some measure of the previous season, perhaps weighted by what percent of the team is returning for the new season. ARGH Power Ratings is an example of a system that uses multiple previous years plus a percentage weight of returning players.

== Rating methods ==
=== Permutation of standings ===
Several methods offer some permutation of traditional standings. This search for the "real" win–loss record often involves using other data, such as point differential or identity of opponents, to alter a team's record in a way that is easily understandable. Sportswriter Gregg Easterbrook created a measure of Authentic Games, which only considers games played against opponents deemed to be of sufficiently high quality. The consensus is that all wins are not created equal.

I went through the first few weeks of games and redid everyone’s records, tagging each game as either a legitimate win or loss, an ass-kicking win or loss, or an either/or game. And if anything else happened in that game with gambling repercussions – a comeback win, a blown lead, major dysfunction, whatever — I tagged that, too.

— Bill Simmons, sportswriter, Grantland

==== Pythagorean ====
Pythagorean expectation, or Pythagorean projection, calculates a percentage based on the number of points a team has scored and allowed. Typically the formula involves the number of points scored, raised to some exponent, placed in the numerator. Then the number of points the team allowed, raised to the same exponent, is placed in the denominator and added to the value in the numerator. Football Outsiders has used

$$\text{Pythagorean wins} = \frac{\text{Points For}^{2.37}}{\text{Points For}^{2.37} + \text{Points Against}^{2.37}}\times \text{Games Played}.$$

The resulting percentage is often compared to a team's true winning percentage, and a team is said to have "overachieved" or "underachieved" compared to the Pythagorean expectation. For example, Bill Barnwell calculated that before week 9 of the 2014 NFL season, the Arizona Cardinals had a Pythagorean record two wins lower than their real record. Bill Simmons cites Barnwell's work before week 10 of that season and adds that "any numbers nerd is waving a “REGRESSION!!!!!” flag right now." In this example, the Arizona Cardinals' regular season record was 8-1 going into the 10th week of the 2014 season. The Pythagorean win formula implied a winning percentage of 57.5%, based on 208 points scored and 183 points allowed. Multiplied by 9 games played, the Cardinals' Pythagorean expectation was 5.2 wins and 3.8 losses. The team had "overachieved" at that time by 2.8 wins, derived from their actual 8 wins less the expected 5.2 wins, an increase of 0.8 overachieved wins from just a week prior.

=== Trading "skill points" ===
Originally designed by Arpad Elo as a method for ranking chess players, several people have adapted the Elo rating system for team sports such as basketball, soccer and American football. For instance, Jeff Sagarin and FiveThirtyEight publish NFL football rankings using Elo methods. Elo ratings initially assign strength values to each team, and teams trade points based on the outcome of each game.

=== Solving equations ===
Researchers like Matt Mills use Markov chains to model college football games, with team strength scores as outcomes. Algorithms like Google's PageRank have also been adapted to rank football teams.

== List of sports rating systems ==
- Advanced NFL Stats, United States of America National Football League
- ARGH Power Ratings
- ATP rankings, international tennis
- Colley Matrix
- Dickinson System, United States of America college football
- Pomeroy College Basketball Ratings, United States of America college basketball
- Ratings Percentage Index (RPI), United States of America NCAA basketball, baseball, softball, hockey, soccer, lacrosse, and volleyball
- Smithman Qualitative Index, United States of America soccer - obsolete
- TrueSkill, a Bayesian ranking system inspired by the Glicko rating system

=== Bowl Championship Series computer rating systems ===
In collegiate American football, the following people's systems were used to choose teams to play in the national championship game.

- Anderson & Hester / Seattle Times
- Richard Billingsley
- Wes Colley / Atlanta Journal-Constitution
- Richard Dunkel
- Kenneth Massey
- Herman Matthews / Scripps Howard
- New York Times
- David Rothman
- Jeff Sagarin / USA Today
- Peter Wolfe
