= 1983 Ole Miss Rebels football team =

American college football season

1983 Ole Miss Rebels football

Independence Bowl, L 3–9 vs. Air Force
- Conference: Southeastern Conference
- Record: 6–6 (4–2 SEC)
- Head coach: Billy Brewer (1st season)
- Offensive coordinator: Robert McGraw (1st season)
- Defensive coordinator: Carl Torbush (1st season)
- Home stadium: Vaught–Hemingway Stadium; Mississippi Veterans Memorial Stadium

1983 Southeastern Conference football standings
	Conf.					Overall
Team	W		L		T	W		L		T
No. 3 Auburn $	6	–	0	–	0	11	–	1	–	0
No. 4 Georgia	5	–	1	–	0	10	–	1	–	1
No. 6 Florida	4	–	2	–	0	9	–	2	–	1
Tennessee	4	–	2	–	0	9	–	3	–	0
No. 15 Alabama	4	–	2	–	0	8	–	4	–	0
Ole Miss	4	–	2	–	0	6	–	6	–	0
Kentucky	2	–	4	–	0	6	–	5	–	1
Mississippi State	1	–	5	–	0	3	–	8	–	0
LSU	0	–	6	–	0	4	–	7	–	0
Vanderbilt	0	–	6	–	0	2	–	9	–	0
$ – Conference champion; Rankings from AP Poll

The 1983 Ole Miss Rebels football team represented the University of Mississippi (Ole Miss) as a member of the Southeastern Conference (SEC) during the 1983 NCAA Division I-A football season. Led by first-year head coach Billy Brewer, the Rebels compiled an overall record of 6–6, with a mark of 4–2 in conference play, and finished tied for third in the SEC.

== Schedule ==
Date	Opponent	Site	TV	Result	Attendance	Source
September 3	at Memphis State*	Liberty Bowl Memorial Stadium; Memphis, TN (rivalry)		L 17–37	51,323	
September 10	at Tulane*	Louisiana Superdome; New Orleans, LA (rivalry)		W 23–27 (Tulane forfeit)	33,389	
September 17	at No. 12 Alabama	Bryant–Denny Stadium; Tuscaloosa, AL (rivalry)		L 0–40	60,210	
September 24	Arkansas*	Mississippi Veterans Memorial Stadium; Jackson, MS (rivalry)		W 13–10	55,720	
October 1	Southern Miss*	Vaught–Hemingway Stadium; Oxford, MS		L 7–27	36,015	
October 8	No. 11 Georgia	Vaught–Hemingway Stadium; Oxford, MS		L 11–36	29,362	
October 15	at TCU*	Amon G. Carter Stadium; Fort Worth, TX		W 20–7	21,176	
October 22	Vanderbilt	Vaught–Hemingway Stadium; Oxford, MS (rivalry)		W 21–14	35,847	
October 29	LSU	Mississippi Veterans Memorial Stadium; Jackson, MS (rivalry)		W 27–24	49,383	
November 12	at Tennessee	Neyland Stadium; Knoxville, TN (rivalry)	TBS	W 13–10	95,585	
November 19	vs. Mississippi State	Mississippi Veterans Memorial Stadium; Jackson, MS (Egg Bowl)		W 24–23	59,758	
December 10	vs. No. 16 Air Force*	Independence Stadium; Shreveport, LA (Independence Bowl)		L 3–9	41,274	
*Non-conference game; Rankings from AP Poll released prior to the game

== Personnel ==
1983 Ole Miss Rebels football team roster
Players
Coaches
Offense

Pos.	#	Name	Class
OL		John Allen (C)
QB		Kent Austin
RB		Arthur Humphrey
RB		Buford McGee (C)
WR		Timmy Moffett	Jr
QB		Kelly Powell
QB		Rusty Reed

Defense

Pos.	#	Name	Class
DB		Johnny Armstrong
LB		Jeff Bacon
DE		Dwight Bingham
DT		Bob Blakemore
LB		Patrick Brown
DB		Roger Clark
LB		Lee Cole
DB		Lee Davis
DT		Mike Fitzsimmons
DT		Marcus Green
DB		Joe Hall
LB		Thomas Hubbard
LB		Fuzzy Huddleson
DE		Carl Lewis
LB		Ricky Lindstrom
DE		Matthew Lovelady
LB		Dwayne Nesmith (C)
DE		Freddy Joe Nunn
DT		Michael Portis
DT		Benton Reed
LB		Jerry Stewart
DT		Andre Townsend (C)
DB		Eric Truitt
DB		Barry Wilburn
DL		Terry Williamson

Special teams

Pos.	#	Name	Class
K		Neil Teevan

Head coach

- Billy Brewer

Coordinators/assistant coaches

Legend

- (C) Team captain
- (S) Suspended
- (I) Ineligible
- Injured
- Redshirt
