= 1983 Tulane Green Wave football team =

American college football season

1983 Tulane Green Wave football
- Conference: Independent
- Record: 2–9, 2 wins forfeited
- Head coach: Wally English (1st season)
- Home stadium: Louisiana Superdome

1983 NCAA Division I-A independents football records
	Conf.					Overall
Team	W		L		T	W		L		T
No. 1 Miami (FL)		–		–		11	–	1	–	0
Virginia Tech		–		–		9	–	2	–	0
No. 19 Boston College		–		–		9	–	3	–	0
No. 16 West Virginia		–		–		9	–	3	–	0
No. 20 East Carolina		–		–		8	–	3	–	0
No. 18 Pittsburgh		–		–		8	–	3	–	1
Florida State		–		–		8	–	4	–	0
Penn State		–		–		8	–	4	–	1
Southern Miss		–		–		7	–	4	–	0
Memphis State		–		–		6	–	4	–	1
Notre Dame		–		–		7	–	5	–	0
Syracuse		–		–		6	–	5	–	0
South Carolina		–		–		5	–	6	–	0
Cincinnati			–			4	–	6	–	1
Southwestern Louisiana		–		–		4	–	6	–	0
Temple		–		–		4	–	7	–	0
Tulane		–		–		4	–	7	–	0
Louisville		–		–		3	–	8	–	0
Navy		–		–		3	–	8	–	0
Rutgers		–		–		3	–	8	–	0
Army		–		–		2	–	9	–	0
Rankings from AP Poll

The 1983 Tulane Green Wave football team was an American football team that represented Tulane University during the 1983 NCAA Division I-A football season as an independent. In their first year under head coach Wally English, the team compiled a 2–9 record. The Green Wave forfeited their victories over Ole Miss and Florida State after the Supreme Court of the United States declined to hear a case on the eligibility of quarterback Jon English, Wally's son, which resulted in the NCAA ruling of his being ineligible due to failing to follow transfer rules being upheld.

== Schedule ==
Date	Opponent	Site	Result	Attendance	Source
September 3	at Mississippi State	Scott Field; Starkville, MS	L 9–14	27,311	
September 10	Ole Miss	Louisiana Superdome; New Orleans, LA (rivalry)	F 27–23 (forfeit)	33,389	
September 17	No. 9 Florida State	Louisiana Superdome; New Orleans, LA	F 34–28 (forfeit)	35,463	
September 24	at Kentucky	Commonwealth Stadium; Lexington, KY	L 14–26	57,424	
October 1	Vanderbilt	Louisiana Superdome; New Orleans, LA	L 17–30	30,756	
October 8	at Memphis State	Liberty Bowl Memorial Stadium; Memphis, TN	L 25–28	29,367	
October 15	Southwestern Louisiana	Louisiana Superdome; New Orleans, LA	W 17–15	26,980	
October 22	at Southern Miss	M. M. Roberts Stadium; Hattiesburg, MS (rivalry)	W 14–7	31,257	
October 29	at Baylor	Baylor Stadium; Waco, TX	L 18–24	20,050	
November 5	Virginia Tech	Louisiana Superdome; New Orleans, LA	L 10–26	21,391	
November 24	LSU	Louisiana Superdome; New Orleans, LA (Battle for the Rag)	L 7–20	51,765	
Rankings from AP Poll released prior to the game
