= 1983 Mississippi State Bulldogs football team =

American college football season

1983 Mississippi State Bulldogs football
- Conference: Southeastern Conference
- Record: 3–8 (1–5 SEC)
- Head coach: Emory Bellard (5th season)
- Defensive coordinator: Melvin Robertson (5th season)
- Home stadium: Scott Field; Mississippi Veterans Memorial Stadium

1983 Southeastern Conference football standings
	Conf.					Overall
Team	W		L		T	W		L		T
No. 3 Auburn $	6	–	0	–	0	11	–	1	–	0
No. 4 Georgia	5	–	1	–	0	10	–	1	–	1
No. 6 Florida	4	–	2	–	0	9	–	2	–	1
Tennessee	4	–	2	–	0	9	–	3	–	0
No. 15 Alabama	4	–	2	–	0	8	–	4	–	0
Ole Miss	4	–	2	–	0	6	–	6	–	0
Kentucky	2	–	4	–	0	6	–	5	–	1
Mississippi State	1	–	5	–	0	3	–	8	–	0
LSU	0	–	6	–	0	4	–	7	–	0
Vanderbilt	0	–	6	–	0	2	–	9	–	0
$ – Conference champion; Rankings from AP Poll

The 1983 Mississippi State Bulldogs football team represented Mississippi State University as a member of the Southeastern Conference (SEC) during the 1983 NCAA Division I-A football season. Led by fifth-year head coach Emory Bellard, the Bulldogs compiled an overall record of 3–8, with a mark of 1–5 in conference play, and finished eighth in the SEC.

With a 45–26 win over LSU, Bulldog quarterback John Bond became the first and only quarterback to register four wins over LSU.

== Schedule ==
Date	Opponent	Site	Result	Attendance	Source
September 3	Tulane*	Scott Field; Starkville, MS	W 14–9	27,311	
September 17	Navy*	Mississippi Veterans Memorial Stadium; Jackson, MS	W 38–10	45,211	
September 24	No. 15 Florida	Scott Field; Starkville, MS	L 12–35	31,875	
October 1	at No. 11 Georgia	Sanford Stadium; Athens, GA	L 7–20	82,122	
October 8	vs. Southern Miss*	Mississippi Veterans Memorial Stadium; Jackson, MS	L 6–31	58,311	
October 15	No. 10 Miami (FL)*	Scott Field; Starkville, MS	L 7–31	29,456	
October 22	at No. 5 Auburn	Jordan-Hare Stadium; Auburn, AL	L 13–28	71,500	
October 29	at No. 18 Alabama	Bryant–Denny Stadium; Tuscaloosa, AL (rivalry)	L 18–35	60,210	
November 5	Memphis State*	Scott Field; Starkville, MS	L 13–30	28,203	
November 12	at LSU	Tiger Stadium; Baton Rouge, LA (rivalry)	W 45–26	74,439	
November 19	vs. Ole Miss	Mississippi Veterans Memorial Stadium; Jackson, MS (Egg Bowl)	L 23–24	59,758	
*Non-conference game; Rankings from AP Poll released prior to the game

== Personnel ==
1983 Mississippi State Bulldogs football team roster
Players
Coaches
Offense

Pos.	#	Name	Class
QB		John Bond	Sr
FB		Rickey Edwards
WR		Danny Knight
RB		Henry Koontz
RB		Elmer Wilson
RB		Lamar Windham

Defense

Pos.	#	Name	Class

Special teams

Pos.	#	Name	Class
K		Artie Crosby

Mike McDonald pos=center

Head coach

- Emory Bellard

Coordinators/assistant coaches

Legend

- (C) Team captain
- (S) Suspended
- (I) Ineligible
- Injured
- Redshirt
