= Billy Brewer =

American football player and coach (1934–2018)

Biographical details
- Born: October 8, 1934; Columbus, Mississippi, U.S.
- Died: May 12, 2018 (aged 83); Memphis, Tennessee, U.S.

Playing career
- 1957–1959: Ole Miss
- 1960: Washington Redskins
- Positions: Defensive back, quarterback

Coaching career (HC unless noted)
- 1972–1973: Southeastern Louisiana (assistant)
- 1974–1979: Southeastern Louisiana
- 1980–1982: Louisiana Tech
- 1983–1993: Ole Miss

Head coaching record
- Overall: 125–94–6
- Bowls: 3–2
- Tournaments: 1–1 (NCAA D-I-AA playoffs)

Accomplishments and honors

Championships
- 1 Southland (1982)

Homer Ervin "Billy" Brewer (October 8, 1934 – May 12, 2018) was an American college football player and coach. He served as the head football coach at Southeastern Louisiana University from 1974 to 1979, Louisiana Tech University from 1980 to 1982, and University of Mississippi (Ole Miss) from 1983 to 1993, compiling a career college football coaching record of 125–94–6. He was also the host of an Ole Miss Rebel football post-game call-in show.

== Playing career ==
A native of Columbus, Mississippi, Brewer first came to Ole Miss as a player for the Rebel teams of Johnny Vaught. He played quarterback, defensive back, punted, and held for placekickers from 1957 to 1960. Ole Miss named him to its "Team of the Century" in 1993.

Brewer was selected by the Washington Redskins in the 20th round of the 1959 NFL draft. He played in 11 games, starting six, for the Redskins during the 1960 season. He was also selected by the Boston Patriots in the 1960 American Football League draft.

== Coaching career ==
=== High school ===
Brewer first coached at Lee High School in Columbus. In 1971, he joined Heritage Academy, a newly formed segregation academy. When Brewer later accepted a coaching position at Ole Miss, he told the Clarion-Ledger that his involvement with the all-white academy was his "own business" and that it would not hurt Ole Miss's efforts to recruit black players.

=== Southeastern Louisiana ===
After a brief professional career, Brewer went into college coaching. He coached defensive backs at Southeastern Louisiana University in Hammond, Louisiana, from 1972 to 1973. In 1974, Brewer was named the tenth head football coach at Southeastern Louisiana and he held that position for six seasons, from 1974 to 1979, compiling a record of 38–24–2.

=== Louisiana Tech ===
Brewer was head coach at Louisiana Tech from 1980 through 1982, posting a record of 19 wins, 15 losses and a tie. His last season at Tech (1982) saw his Bulldogs win the Southland Conference title with a 10–3 record. They lost to Delaware 17–0 in the first round of the Division I-AA (now Football Championship Subdivision) playoffs.

=== Ole Miss ===
Brewer took over at Ole Miss in 1983, succeeding Steve Sloan, who was 20–34–1 in the previous five seasons. Brewer's previous affiliation with Ole Miss made him a favorite in some circles at Ole Miss. An "outsider" had served as head coach since the end of Vaught's second stint in the position in 1974. Others, however, thought that Brewer's ties to Vaught and Vaught's associates were the only reasons he was considered for the position.

With Ole Miss talent trailing the rest of the Southeastern Conference, Brewer was never able to win a conference title. However, many of his teams were known for over-achieving, embodying the scrappy persona of their combative coach. On the flip side, some of his teams failed to live up to those expectations after being the subjects of considerable preseason hype.

In his first season, Brewer guided the Rebels to their first winning regular season since 1977 with a 7–4 mark (they were subsequently awarded a win over Tulane by forfeit a year later). The Rebels also received their first bowl game invitation since 1971 and met Air Force in the Independence Bowl played in Shreveport, Louisiana. Ole Miss dropped a 9–3 decision to the Falcons and finished with a 7–5 record.

During his 11-year tenure, Brewer led the Rebels to six winning seasons and five bowls. He was named SEC Coach of the Year in 1986 (8–3–1 record), which saw the Rebels return to the national rankings for the first time in over a decade and tie for second in the SEC—their highest finish in 11 years. They just missed out on their first SEC title in 24 years due to a 22–10 loss to the University of Tennessee the second to last game of the season.

The next year, the Rebels returned nine starters on both sides of the ball, and expectations were as high as they had been in more than a decade. However, they flopped to a 3–8 record, a severely disappointing mark even considering that they were hobbled by NCAA sanctions for recruiting violations under Sloan. They were outscored 127–47 in the season's final three games. Following a 35–6 loss to a mediocre Kentucky team that put that year's team at 1–5, an anonymous group of students under the name Students Against Billy Brewer even took out an ad in the university student newspaper calling for Brewer's firing.

The 1988 team, with little expected by most people, defeated Alabama in Tuscaloosa on their homecoming for the first time in history, came from behind to win two more games and looked to be in excellent position to secure a winning season and bowl berth. But the Rebels fell to Tulane in a devastating 14–9 upset on homecoming and also suffered a very heartbreaking loss to a 5–6 Tennessee team at home before rallying to trounce Mississippi State 33–6 in a severe thunderstorm in Jackson. Ole Miss would go 8–4 in 1989, and in the aforementioned 1990 season would notch nine wins and again narrowly miss an SEC title due to a loss to Tennessee. They also made their first appearance in a final media poll since 1971 and played in the 1991 Gator Bowl—their first New Year's Day bowl appearance since the 1970 Sugar Bowl at the end of Vaught's next-to-last season. However, none of the nine wins came against a team with a winning record. Brewer garnered SEC Coach of the Year honors that season.

In 1992, Ole Miss posted yet another nine-win season and finished with a national top 15 ranking. But the next year and what turned out to be Brewer's last, Ole Miss would become the first team ever in college football to finish with a losing record (though they were awarded a win by forfeit over Alabama years later, giving them an in-the-books winning season) despite leading the nation in total defense.

In his 11 seasons, Brewer led Ole Miss to eight Egg Bowl victories over in-state rival Mississippi State.

At Ole Miss, Brewer compiled a 67–56–3 record, placing him second on Ole Miss' all-time wins list behind Vaught.

However, Brewer's tenure at Ole Miss was marred by allegations of recruiting improprieties that twice led to run-ins with the NCAA. The Rebels were banned from post-season play and live television for the 1987 season after a two-year investigation found that Ole Miss recruits had received cash and other gifts from boosters. The penalties were a source of embarrassment for Dr. Gerald Turner, then Ole Miss' chancellor and previously the head of the NCAA's President's Commission, and one of the first milestones in Turner's stormy relationship with Brewer. "We have made some mistakes," Brewer said at a news conference following the announcement of the sanctions. "We are being punished for those mistakes, and we do not intend ever to be in this situation again."

However, in December 1993, Brewer and Ole Miss were again hit by allegations of recruiting violations. The NCAA would eventually cite the program for 15 transgressions, all of them serious and some of them embarrassingly lurid. An NCAA report said that Ole Miss boosters and coaches had offered recruits gifts, including cash and, in one case, a car. Boosters were also accused of breaking national rules by taking recruits 30 miles outside of Oxford, sometimes to strip clubs in Memphis. Most damningly, the NCAA alleged that Ole Miss officials knowingly allowed the violations to occur, demonstrating a lack of institutional control of the football program.

The charges forced Athletic Director Warner Alford to resign in July 1994. One day later, Turner fired Brewer, granting him 30 days' paid leave but no other severance package for the three years remaining on his contract. Later that year, the NCAA, when announcing severe penalties against the Ole Miss football program, found Brewer guilty of unethical conduct. Specifically, it stated "There was unethical conduct by a former (Ole Miss) head football coach (Brewer), who was found to show a continuing pattern of disregard for NCAA rules in the operation of the football program ((Jackson, MS) Clarion Ledger, November 18, 1994, p.6–7C)." Brewer sued the university for his dismissal, eventually receiving several hundred thousand dollars.

== Late life and death ==
In his last several years, Brewer took a more prominent role again in Oxford, appearing on television ads and on a radio show. He was inducted to the Ole Miss M-Club Athletics Hall of Fame in 2011.

Brewer died on May 12, 2018, at age 83.

== Head coaching record ==
Year	Team	Overall	Conference	Standing	Bowl/playoffs	Coaches^{#}	AP^{°}
Southeastern Louisiana Lions (Gulf South Conference) (1974–1978)
1974	Southeastern Louisiana	6–4	5–3	T–3rd			
1975	Southeastern Louisiana	4–7	2–6	8th			
1976	Southeastern Louisiana	9–1–1	6–1–1	2nd			
1977	Southeastern Louisiana	6–4	5–3	4th			
1978	Southeastern Louisiana	7–3–1	5–1–1	2nd			
Southeastern Louisiana Lions (NCAA Division II independent) (1979)
1979	Southeastern Louisiana	6–5					
Southeastern Louisiana:		38–24–2	23–14–2				
Louisiana Tech Bulldogs (Southland Conference) (1980–1982)
1980	Louisiana Tech	5–6	2–3	4th			
1981	Louisiana Tech	4–6–1	2–2–1	4th			
1982	Louisiana Tech	10–3	5–0	1st	L NCAA Division I-AA Semifinal		
Louisiana Tech:		19–15–1	9–5–1				
Ole Miss Rebels (Southeastern Conference) (1983–1993)
1983	Ole Miss	7–5*	4–2	T–3rd	L Independence		
1984	Ole Miss	4–6–1	1–5	T–9th			
1985	Ole Miss	4–6–1	2–4	7th			
1986	Ole Miss	8–3–1	4–2	T–2nd	W Independence		
1987	Ole Miss	3–8	1–5	T–7th			
1988	Ole Miss	5–6	3–4	T–6th			
1989	Ole Miss	8–4	4–3	T–4th	W Liberty		
1990	Ole Miss	9–3	5–2	T–3rd	L Gator	21	21
1991	Ole Miss	5–6	1–6	9th			
1992	Ole Miss	9–3	5–3	2nd (Western)	W Liberty	16	16
1993	Ole Miss	6–5^	4–4^	T–4th (Western)			
Ole Miss:		68–55–3*^	34–37^				
Total:		125–94–6*^					
National championship Conference title Conference division title or championship game berth
^{#}Rankings from final Coaches Poll.; ^{°}Rankings from final AP Poll.
