= 1983 LSU Tigers football team =

American college football season

1983 LSU Tigers football
- Conference: Southeastern Conference
- Record: 4–7 (0–6 SEC)
- Head coach: Jerry Stovall (4th season)
- Offensive coordinator: George Belu (5th season)
- Offensive scheme: I-formation
- Base defense: 5-2
- Home stadium: Tiger Stadium

1983 Southeastern Conference football standings
	Conf.					Overall
Team	W		L		T	W		L		T
No. 3 Auburn $	6	–	0	–	0	11	–	1	–	0
No. 4 Georgia	5	–	1	–	0	10	–	1	–	1
No. 6 Florida	4	–	2	–	0	9	–	2	–	1
Tennessee	4	–	2	–	0	9	–	3	–	0
No. 15 Alabama	4	–	2	–	0	8	–	4	–	0
Ole Miss	4	–	2	–	0	6	–	6	–	0
Kentucky	2	–	4	–	0	6	–	5	–	1
Mississippi State	1	–	5	–	0	3	–	8	–	0
LSU	0	–	6	–	0	4	–	7	–	0
Vanderbilt	0	–	6	–	0	2	–	9	–	0
$ – Conference champion; Rankings from AP Poll

The 1983 LSU Tigers football team represented Louisiana State University (LSU) as a member of the Southeastern Conference (SEC) during the 1983 NCAA Division I-A football season. Led by fourth-year head coach Jerry Stovall, the Tigers compiled an overall record of 4–7, with a mark of 0–6 in conference play, and finished tied for ninth in the SEC.

Following an Orange Bowl berth and a No. 11 final ranking the previous season, LSU cratered in its fourth season under Jerry Stovall, going winless in the Southeastern Conference for the only time in program history. The Tigers ended the season with a nationally televised victory against Tulane on Thanksgiving night, but it was not enough to save Stovall's job. The former LSU All-American and 1962 Heisman Trophy runner-up was fired by a 13–5 vote of the LSU Board of Supervisors (over the strenuous objection of board member and former Governor John McKeithen, who argued Stovall should have been allowed to finish his five-year contract) December 2. Stovall's career record was 22–21–2.

Three days after Stovall's firing, Miami Dolphins defensive coordinator Bill Arnsparger was named as his successor.

== Schedule ==
Date	Opponent	Rank	Site	TV	Result	Attendance	Source
September 10	No. 12 Florida State*	No. 13	Tiger Stadium; Baton Rouge, LA	ABC	L 35–40	79,665	
September 17	at Rice*		Rice Stadium; Houston, TX		W 24–10	34,000	
September 24	No. 9 Washington*		Tiger Stadium; Baton Rouge, LA	PPV	W 40–14	82,390	
October 1	No. 12 Florida	No. 16	Tiger Stadium; Baton Rouge, LA (rivalry)	PPV	L 17–31	78,616	
October 8	at Tennessee		Neyland Stadium; Knoxville, TN	TBS	L 6–20	94,478	
October 15	Kentucky^{†}		Tiger Stadium; Baton Rouge, LA	PPV	L 13–21	77,765	
October 22	South Carolina*		Tiger Stadium; Baton Rouge, LA	PPV	W 20–6	71,951	
October 29	at Ole Miss		Mississippi Veterans Memorial Stadium; Jackson, MS (rivalry)	PPV	L 24–27	49,383	
November 5	No. 19 Alabama		Tiger Stadium; Baton Rouge, LA (rivalry)	ABC	L 26–32	70,606	
November 12	Mississippi State		Tiger Stadium; Baton Rouge, LA (rivalry)	PPV	L 26–45	74,439	
November 24	at Tulane*		Louisiana Superdome; New Orleans, LA (Battle for the Rag)	TBS	W 20–7	51,765	
*Non-conference game; ^{†}Homecoming; Rankings from AP Poll released prior to the game

== Personnel ==
1983 LSU Tigers football team roster
Players
Coaches
Offense

Pos.	#	Name	Class
TE	83	Mitch Andrews	So
RB	28	Herman Fontenot	Jr
RB	21	Dalton Hilliard	So
RB	33	Garry James	So
WR	41	Eric Martin	Jr
G	75	Lance Smith	Jr
QB	5	Jeff Wickersham	So

Defense

Pos.	#	Name	Class
DE	77	Roland Barbay	Fr
LB	69	Toby Caston	Fr
CB	35	Eugene Daniel	Sr
S	4	Jeffery Dale	Jr
S	12	Norman Jefferson	Fr
LB	51	Albert Richardson	Sr

Special teams

Pos.	#	Name	Class
K	9	Juan Betanzos	So
P	1	Clay Parker	So

Head coach

- Jerry Stovall

Coordinators/assistant coaches

- George Belu – Offensive coordinator/offensive line
- Morris Watts – Quarterbacks
- Darrel Moody – Running backs
- Stephen Regan – Wide receivers
- Charlie Butler – Offensive line
- Pete Jenkins – Defensive line
- Bishop Harris – Outside linebackers
- Buddy Nix – Inside linebackers
- Bruce Johnson – Defensive backs
- Sam Nader – Recruiting coordinator

Legend

- (C) Team captain
- (S) Suspended
- (I) Ineligible
- Injured
- Redshirt

Roster
