= 1983 Vanderbilt Commodores football team =

American college football season

1983 Vanderbilt Commodores football
- Conference: Southeastern Conference
- Record: 2–9 (0–6 SEC)
- Head coach: George MacIntyre (5th season)
- Offensive coordinator: Lynn Amedee (1st season)
- Defensive coordinator: Bob Brush (2nd season)
- Home stadium: Vanderbilt Stadium

1983 Southeastern Conference football standings
	Conf.					Overall
Team	W		L		T	W		L		T
No. 3 Auburn $	6	–	0	–	0	11	–	1	–	0
No. 4 Georgia	5	–	1	–	0	10	–	1	–	1
No. 6 Florida	4	–	2	–	0	9	–	2	–	1
Tennessee	4	–	2	–	0	9	–	3	–	0
No. 15 Alabama	4	–	2	–	0	8	–	4	–	0
Ole Miss	4	–	2	–	0	6	–	6	–	0
Kentucky	2	–	4	–	0	6	–	5	–	1
Mississippi State	1	–	5	–	0	3	–	8	–	0
LSU	0	–	6	–	0	4	–	7	–	0
Vanderbilt	0	–	6	–	0	2	–	9	–	0
$ – Conference champion; Rankings from AP Poll

The 1983 Vanderbilt Commodores football team represented Vanderbilt University in the 1983 NCAA Division I-A football season. The Commodores were led by head coach George MacIntyre in his fifth season and finished the season with a record of two wins and nine losses (2–9 overall, 0–6 in the SEC).

== Schedule ==
Date	Opponent	Site	Result	Attendance	Source
September 10	No. 17 Maryland*	Vanderbilt Stadium; Nashville, TN	L 14–21	40,856	
September 17	Iowa State*	Vanderbilt Stadium; Nashville, TN	W 29–26	41,165	
September 24	No. 6 Alabama	Vanderbilt Stadium; Nashville, TN	L 24–44	41,418	
October 1	at Tulane*	Louisiana Superdome; New Orleans, LA	W 30–17	30,756	
October 8	at No. 9 Florida	Florida Field; Gainesville, FL	L 10–29	73,764	
October 15	No. 8 Georgia	Vanderbilt Stadium; Nashville, TN (rivalry)	L 13–20	41,223	
October 22	at Ole Miss	Vaught–Hemingway Stadium; Oxford, MS (rivalry)	L 14–21	35,847	
October 29	Memphis State*	Vanderbilt Stadium; Nashville, TN	L 7–24	40,485	
November 5	Kentucky	Vanderbilt Stadium; Nashville, TN (rivalry)	L 8–17	41,156	
November 12	at Virginia Tech*	Lane Stadium; Blacksburg, VA	L 10–21	27,300	
November 26	at Tennessee	Neyland Stadium; Knoxville, TN (rivalry)	L 24–34	93,426	
*Non-conference game; Rankings from AP Poll released prior to the game
