= Alan Cockrell =

American baseball player and coach (born 1962)

- Outfielder
- Born: December 5, 1962 (age 63); Kansas City, Kansas, U.S.
- Batted: Right Threw: Right

MLB debut
- September 7, 1996, for the Colorado Rockies

Last MLB appearance
- September 29, 1996, for the Colorado Rockies

MLB statistics
- Batting average: .250
- Home runs: 0
- Runs batted in: 2
- Stats at Baseball Reference

Teams
- As player: Colorado Rockies (1996); As coach: Colorado Rockies (2002, 2007–2008); Seattle Mariners (2009–2010); New York Yankees (2015–2017)

Atlee Alan Cockrell (born December 5, 1962) is an American former professional baseball outfielder and coach.

== Football career ==
Twice named first-team all state, Cockrell led Joplin, Missouri's Parkwood High School Bears football team to a 31–3 record during his three years as starting quarterback. Cockrell would pass (3,499 yards and 44 touchdowns), run (1,541 yards and 36 touchdowns), and even kick (154 extra points and eight field goals).

Cockrell led the Bears' offensive attack to an undefeated season (14–0 – outscoring opponents 653–33) and the Missouri State Class 4A High School Championship in 1980, despite being one of the smallest schools in Class 4A. That team has recently been inducted into the Joplin Area Sports Hall of Fame, alongside the likes of NASCAR's Jamie McMurray. Heavily recruited by several schools, he chose to attend the University of Tennessee.

Under head coach Johnny Majors, Cockrell became the first true freshman ever to start at quarterback for the Volunteers in 1981. In the fifth game into the season, he suffered a major knee injury against the Auburn Tigers and his future became uncertain. One of the first football players to come back from such major knee damage, he led the Vols in the 1982 (6–5–1) and 1983 (9–3) seasons, culminating in a 30–23 victory over the Maryland Terrapins (led by future NFL standout Boomer Esiason) in the inaugural Florida Citrus Bowl (now Capital One Bowl). The victory was a great ending for Cockrell, as it would be his last game at the University of Tennessee. He was soon to be a first round draft pick by the San Francisco Giants.

=== College football statistics ===
Year	School	Conf	Cmp	Att	Pct	Yds	Y/A	AY/A	TD	Int	Rate
1981	Tennessee	SEC	15	31	48.4	119	3.8	1.6	1	2	78.4
1982	Tennessee	SEC	174	294	59.2	2,021	6.9	5.4	12	15	120.2
1983	Tennessee	SEC	128	243	52.7	1,683	6.9	6.1	13	10	120.3
Career	Tennessee		317	568	55.8	3,823	6.7	5.5	26	27	117.9

== Baseball career ==
Cockrell's first love had always been baseball, and he was an even better outfielder than he was a quarterback. An All-American, he was named to the Tennessee All-Century Baseball Team in 2009. The San Francisco Giants made Cockrell the ninth pick overall in the 1984 MLB draft, and he chose to forgo his senior year in college and play professional baseball.

Cockrell played in the minor leagues for thirteen years with five different organizations, including five years with the Colorado Springs Sky Sox. He starred for the Sky Sox and eventually became a member of the Sky Sox Hall of Fame. He was a replacement player in spring training in 1995 during the players' strike. At the end of the 1996 season, at the age of 33, he finally had a cup of coffee in the major leagues. He debuted for the Colorado Rockies on September 7, with a pinch hit appearance in which he struck out against future Baseball Hall of Fame closer Billy Wagner. Cockrell's first major league hit came three days later on a pinch-hit double off Tom Glavine against the Atlanta Braves at Coors Field. Cockrell had nine plate appearances for the Rockies and retired at the end of the season.

== Coaching career ==
Cockrell spent the next few years working as a manager and hitting coach in various parts of the Colorado Rockies' development system. He returned to the MLB when he was named hitting coach for the Rockies on November 7, 2006 – his second stint, having previously served as hitting instructor the last five months of the 2002 season when Clint Hurdle was promoted to manager. Under Cockrell's guidance in 2007, the Rockies slugged their way to a National League pennant, leading the league in batting average, on-base percentage, and hits. Cockrell was one of four coaches let go by the Rockies after a disappointing 2008 season, when the team won only 74 games.

On December 7, 2008, Cockrell was named hitting coach for the Seattle Mariners. On May 9, 2010, Cockrell the first of four coaches who were relieved of their duties alongside manager Don Wakamatsu. He was replaced by Alonzo Powell.

On January 11, 2015, the New York Yankees hired Cockrell to be one of the two hitting coaches, along with Jeff Pentland. On November 2, Cockrell was named the hitting coach of the Yankees after the firing of Pentland. Marcus Thames was hired as assistant hitting coach. After the 2017 season, the Yankees let Joe Girardi's contract expire and hired Aaron Boone to be their next manager. Cockrell's contract was not renewed after the coaching change.

Preceded by Jeff Pentland	New York Yankees Hitting Coach; 2016–2017	Succeeded by Marcus Thames
