= Joker Phillips =

American football player and coach (born 1963)

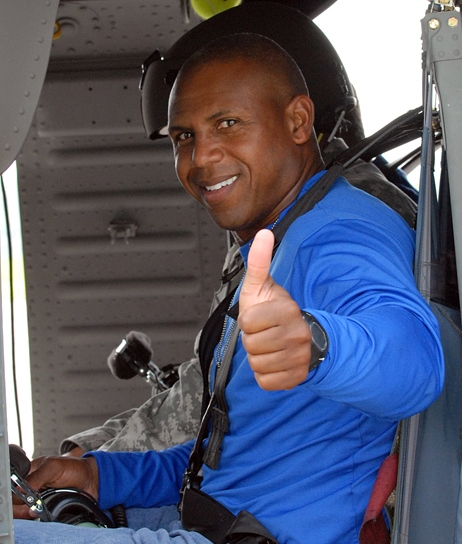
- Phillips visits the Kentucky Army National Guard in 2010

Current position
- Title: Assistant head coach Wide receivers coach
- Team: NC State
- Conference: ACC

Biographical details
- Born: May 12, 1963 (age 63); Franklin, Kentucky, U.S.

Playing career
- 1981–1984: Kentucky
- 1985: Washington Redskins
- 1986: Toronto Argonauts
- 1987: Washington Redskins
- Position: Wide receiver

Coaching career (HC unless noted)
- 1988–1989: Kentucky (GA)
- 1990: Kentucky (assistant RC)
- 1991–1996: Kentucky (WR)
- 1997: Cincinnati (WR)
- 1998: Cincinnati (DB)
- 1999–2000: Minnesota (WR)
- 2001: Notre Dame (WR)
- 2002: South Carolina (WR)
- 2003: Kentucky (RC/WR)
- 2004: Kentucky (RC/PGC/WR)
- 2005–2009: Kentucky (OC/WR)
- 2010–2012: Kentucky
- 2013: Florida (WR/RC)
- 2015: Cleveland Browns (WR)
- 2016: Ohio State (OQC)
- 2017–2018: Cincinnati (WR)
- 2019–2020: Maryland (co-OC/WR)
- 2021–present: NC State (AHC/WR)

Head coaching record
- Overall: 13–24
- Bowls: 0–1

Joe "Joker" Phillips Jr. (born May 12, 1963) is an American football coach and former player. He is the assistant head football coach and wide receivers coach at North Carolina State University, a position he has held since the 2021 season. Phillips served as the head football coach at the University of Kentucky from 2010 to 2012.

== Playing career ==
After a standout career at Franklin-Simpson High School, in which he played quarterback for two Kentucky state Class AAA championship teams, Phillips played wide receiver at the University of Kentucky from 1981 through 1984, under head coaches Fran Curci and Jerry Claiborne. During his playing career for the Kentucky Wildcats, Phillips caught 75 passes for 935 yards and nine touchdowns at the wide receiver position. Phillips played on the 1984 Kentucky Wildcats football team that went 9–3, finished #19 in the AP Poll, and won the 1984 Hall of Fame Classic Bowl. At the time of his departure from Lexington, he stood fifth on the school's receiving list.

After college, Phillips played two seasons in the National Football League (NFL) for the Washington Redskins. Phillips later played for the Toronto Argonauts of the Canadian Football League (CFL).

== Coaching career ==
After his career in the NFL, Phillips became a graduate assistant on the Kentucky football team. In 1990, he was promoted to assistant recruiting coordinator and in 1991 to wide receivers coach. In 1997, he was hired as wide receivers coach at the University of Cincinnati. Following two seasons in Cincinnati, Phillips made coaching stops at Minnesota, Notre Dame, and South Carolina. Phillips succeeded Urban Meyer as wide receivers coach at Notre Dame.

When Rich Brooks was hired as head football coach at Kentucky in late 2002, Phillips returned to his alma mater to serve as recruiting coordinator and wide receivers coach. With the departure of Ron Hudson late in the 2004 season, he was named offensive coordinator of the Wildcats.

Phillips helped to rejuvenate Kentucky's offensive scheme. Under Phillips' balanced offense, André Woodson established himself as one of the top quarterbacks in the country. In his first full season as offensive coordinator, Kentucky finished with an 8–5 record and defeated Clemson in the 2006 Music City Bowl. In 2007, Kentucky finished the season with another 8–5 record, defeating Florida State in the 2007 Music City Bowl. Winning the Music City Bowl for the second year in a row was the first time the Wildcats had won two consecutive bowls in over 50 years. The Wildcats finished in the top 15 nationally in points scored per game and averaged 460 yards of offense. In 2008 the Wildcats finished 7–6 with a victory over East Carolina in the Liberty Bowl.

In January 2008, Phillips was named as Brooks' successor, and his title was changed to "head coach of the offense". He was named head coach of the Wildcats on January 4, 2010, after Brooks' retirement. Phillips was the second African-American head football coach in the SEC, after former Mississippi State coach Sylvester Croom. He was also the third African-American head coach of a major sport at Kentucky; the first was Bernadette Maddox, who coached the women's basketball team from 1995 to 2003, and the second was Tubby Smith, who coached men's basketball from 1997 to 2007.

In 2011, he led the Wildcats' to a season-ending 10–7 victory over Tennessee, their first over the Volunteers since 1984, ended the longest current losing streak against an annual opponent in FBS at 26.

Kentucky athletic director Mitch Barnhart announced on November 4, 2012, that Phillips would not return as coach in 2013 after a 1–9 start to the season. Barnhart did say that Phillips would coach the remaining games and finish out the year on the sidelines for the Wildcats.

On December 3, 2012, Phillips was hired by the University of Florida as wide receivers coach and recruiting coordinator. In April 2014, Florida suspended Phillips for impermissible conduct with a recruit; Phillips resigned in June 2014. In February 2015, the NCAA ruled that Phillips committed a Level II violation that "was not inadvertent and provided more than a minimal recruiting advantage." The NCAA did not penalize Florida.

On January 29, 2015, the Cleveland Browns hired Phillips as wide receivers coach under Mike Pettine. Phillips was not retained for the next season, when Hue Jackson replaced Pettine as head coach.

On June 29, 2016, Ohio State hired Phillips as a Quality Control Assistant under head coach Urban Meyer. Phillips returned to the University of Cincinnati in 2017 to coach Wide Receivers, a position he held through the 2018 season.

== Personal life ==
Joe Phillips Jr. was given his nickname "Joker" by his grandfather to distinguish him from his father, also named Joe. He was married to Leslie Stamatis, associate professor of kinesiology at Georgetown College in Kentucky, from 1999 through 2017 when they divorced.

== Head coaching record ==
Year	Team	Overall	Conference	Standing	Bowl/playoffs
Kentucky Wildcats (Southeastern Conference) (2010–2012)
2010	Kentucky	6–7	2–6	5th (Eastern)	L BBVA Compass
2011	Kentucky	5–7	2–6	5th (Eastern)	
2012	Kentucky	2–10	0–8	7th (Eastern)	
Kentucky:		13–24	4–20		
Total:		13–24			
