= ARGH Power Ratings =

Sports rating system

The ARGH Power Ratings are a sports rating system created by Stewart Huckaby in 1990 and designed to identify the best team from within a closed system. They are most closely identified with NCAA football. The system is designed to be both predictive and retrodictive in nature, although in practice it has proven to be more strongly predictive than retrodictive.

The ARGH Power Ratings evaluate teams taking into account a team's wins and losses, its points scored both for and against, its schedule, and the location of the team's games. It is unusual in that for the purposes of providing meaningful ratings throughout the season it seeds teams based on several stated criteria, including records from the previous two seasons, the previous year's strength of schedule, the number of returning starters, whether the head coach is returning, whether the starting quarterback is returning, and published recruiting rankings from several preseason publications. Preseason seedings disappear over the course of the season, and are completely absent from consideration by the time the season ends.

This system is also sometimes used for NCAA basketball, but due to the relative lack of available preseason information, ARGH basketball power ratings are strictly retrodictive in nature.
