= 1983 Gator Bowl =

- 39th Gator Bowl Game
Iowa Hawkeyes	Florida Gators
(9–2)	(8–2–1)
Big Ten	SEC
6	14
Head coach: Hayden Fry	Head coach: Charley Pell
AP / Coaches; 10 / 10	AP / Coaches; 11 / 11
	1	2	3	4	Total
Iowa	0	3	3	0	6
Florida	7	7	0	0	14
- Date: December 30, 1983
- Season: 1983
- Stadium: Gator Bowl Stadium
- Location: Jacksonville, FL
- MVP: Owen Gill (Iowa RB); Tony Lilly (Florida S)
- Referee: Jim Garvey (Eastern independent)
- Attendance: 81,293

United States TV coverage
- Network: ABC
- Announcers: Al Michaels and Frank Broyles

The 1983 Gator Bowl was an American college football bowl game played on December 30, 1983, at Gator Bowl Stadium in Jacksonville, FL. The matchup featured the 10th-ranked Iowa Hawkeyes of the Big Ten Conference and the 11th-ranked Florida Gators of the Southeastern Conference. The Gators won, 14–6, to secure their first top 10 ranking in the season's final polls.

== Teams ==
The 1983 Gator Bowl was the first meeting between the two programs.

== Game summary ==
=== Scoring summary ===
Scoring summary

Quarter	Time	Drive			Team	Scoring information	Score	
Quarter	Time	Plays	Yards	TOP	Team	Scoring information	IOWA	FLA
1	0:40	12	87	5:53	FLA	Neal Anderson 1-yard touchdown run, Bobby Raymond kick good	0	7
2	5:45	12	88	6:14	IOWA	32-yard field goal by Tom Nichol	3	7
2	1:08				FLA	Fumble recovery returned 0 yards for touchdown by Doug Drew, Bobby Raymond kick good	3	14
3	11:00	6	15	3:04	IOWA	31-yard field goal by Tom Nichol	6	14
"TOP" = time of possession. For other American football terms, see Glossary of American football.							6	14

=== Team statistics ===
	Iowa	Florida
First downs	16	14
Rushing yards	40–114	44–168
Passing	13–30–4	9–23–2
Passing yards	167	92
Total offense	281	250
Fumbles lost	2–1	0–0
Punts–average	2–40.0	7–38.0
Penalties	7–44	12–105

=== Individual leaders ===
Passing
Iowa: Long – 13-28, 167 yds, 4 INT
Florida: Peace – 9-22, 92 yds, 2 INT

Rushing
Iowa: Gill – 10 carries, 83 yds; Granger – 9 carries, 37 yds
Florida: Anderson – 17 carries, 84 yds, 1 TD; Williams – 10 carries, 68 yds

Receiving
Iowa: Harmon – 6 catches, 90 yds
Florida: Dixon – 5 catches, 55 yds
