= Lee Davis (American football) =

American football player (born 1962)

No. 31, 28
- Position: Defensive back

Personal information
- Born: December 18, 1962 (age 63); Okolona, Mississippi, U.S.
- Listed height: 5 ft 11 in (1.80 m)
- Listed weight: 198 lb (90 kg)

Career information
- High school: Amory (Amory, Mississippi)
- College: Ole Miss
- NFL draft: 1985: 5th round, 129th overall pick

Career history
- Cincinnati Bengals (1985); Seattle Seahawks (1986)*; Los Angeles Raiders (1987)*; Indianapolis Colts (1987); New York Jets (1988)*
- * Offseason or practice squad member only
- Stats at Pro Football Reference

Lee Andrew Davis (born December 18, 1962) is an American former professional football defensive back who played in the National Football League (NFL) with the Cincinnati Bengals and Indianapolis Colts. He played college football for the Ole Miss Rebels and was selected by the Bengals in the fifth round of the 1985 NFL draft.

== Early life ==
Lee Andrew Davis was born on December 18, 1962, in Okolona, Mississippi. He attended Amory High School in Amory, Mississippi.

== College career ==
Davis enrolled at University of Mississippi to play college football for the Ole Miss Rebels as a cornerback. He was a four-year letterman in 1981, 1983, and 1984. He did not earn a letter in 1982 as he suffered a broken leg before the fourth game of the season. Davis recorded college career totals of seven interceptions for 114 yards, and 22 kick returns for 537 yards and one touchdown. He majored in criminal corrections at Ole Miss.

== Professional career ==
Davis was selected by the Cincinnati Bengals in the fifth round, with the 129th overall pick, of the 1985 NFL draft. Davis did not know he was eligible for the draft until the day before. He had been granted a hardship year by the NCAA but became ineligible after he signed with an NFL agent. He signed with the Bengals on June 25. Davis was released on September 2 but re-signed on September 3. He played in seven games for the Bengals as a reserve cornerback. He was released on October 24, 1985, after being arrested for carrying a concealed weapon.

Davis signed with the Seattle Seahawks on April 15, 1986. He was released on August 18 after the second game of the 1986 preseason.

Davis was signed by the Los Angeles Raiders on May 2, 1987. He was released on August 27, 1987, after the second preseason game.

On September 23, 1987, Davis signed with the Indianapolis Colts during the 1987 NFL players strike. He played in all three strike games for the Colts as a backup safety/cornerback, recording one interception for seven yards and one fumble recovery. He was released on October 19, 1987, after the strike ended.

Davis was signed by the New York Jets on May 3, 1988. However, he was later released.

== Personal life ==
Davis' son, Cortez Davis, played college football at the University of Tennessee at Chattanooga, Itawamba Community College, and the University of Hawaiʻi at Mānoa. Cortez was a member of the Denver Broncos and Arizona Cardinals during the 2022 NFL offseason.
