= 1983 Tennessee Volunteers football team =

American college football season

1983 Tennessee Volunteers football

Florida Citrus Bowl champion

Florida Citrus Bowl, W 30–23 vs. Maryland
- Conference: Southeastern Conference
- Record: 9–3 (4–2 SEC)
- Head coach: Johnny Majors (7th season)
- Offensive coordinator: Walt Harris (1st season)
- Offensive scheme: Multiple
- Defensive coordinator: Larry Marmie (1st season)
- Base defense: 5–2
- Captain: Reggie White
- Home stadium: Neyland Stadium

1983 Southeastern Conference football standings
| | Conf. | | | | | Overall |
| Team | W | | L | | T | W | | L | | T |
|---|---|---|---|---|---|---|---|---|---|---|
| No. 3 Auburn $ | 6 | – | 0 | – | 0 | 11 | – | 1 | – | 0 |
| No. 4 Georgia | 5 | – | 1 | – | 0 | 10 | – | 1 | – | 1 |
| No. 6 Florida | 4 | – | 2 | – | 0 | 9 | – | 2 | – | 1 |
| Tennessee | 4 | – | 2 | – | 0 | 9 | – | 3 | – | 0 |
| No. 15 Alabama | 4 | – | 2 | – | 0 | 8 | – | 4 | – | 0 |
| Ole Miss | 4 | – | 2 | – | 0 | 6 | – | 6 | – | 0 |
| Kentucky | 2 | – | 4 | – | 0 | 6 | – | 5 | – | 1 |
| Mississippi State | 1 | – | 5 | – | 0 | 3 | – | 8 | – | 0 |
| LSU | 0 | – | 6 | – | 0 | 4 | – | 7 | – | 0 |
| Vanderbilt | 0 | – | 6 | – | 0 | 2 | – | 9 | – | 0 |
$ – Conference champion; Rankings from AP Poll

The 1983 Tennessee Volunteers football team (variously "Tennessee", "UT" or the "Vols") represented the University of Tennessee in the 1983 NCAA Division I-A football season. Playing as a member of the Southeastern Conference (SEC), the team was led by head coach Johnny Majors, in his seventh year, and played their home games at Neyland Stadium in Knoxville, Tennessee. They finished the season with a record of nine wins and three losses (9–3 overall, 4–2 in the SEC) and a victory over Maryland in the Florida Citrus Bowl. The Volunteers offense scored 282 points while the defense allowed 165 points.

== Schedule ==
| Date | Opponent | Site | TV | Result | Attendance | Source |
|---|---|---|---|---|---|---|
| September 3 | No. 10 Pittsburgh* | Neyland Stadium; Knoxville, TN | | L 3–13 | 95,824 | |
| September 10 | New Mexico* | Neyland Stadium; Knoxville, TN | | W 31–6 | 89,792 | |
| September 24 | No. 11 Auburn | Neyland Stadium; Knoxville, TN | | L 14–37 | 95,185 | |
| October 1 | vs. The Citadel* | Liberty Bowl Memorial Stadium; Memphis, TN | | W 45–6 | 20,351 | |
| October 8 | LSU | Neyland Stadium; Knoxville, TN | TBS | W 20–6 | 94,478 | |
| October 15 | at No. 11 Alabama | Legion Field; Birmingham, AL (Third Saturday in October) | | W 41–34 | 77,237 | |
| October 22 | Georgia Tech* | Neyland Stadium; Knoxville, TN | | W 37–3 | 94,478 | |
| October 29 | at Rutgers* | Giants Stadium; East Rutherford, NJ | | W 7–0 | 19,201 | |
| November 12 | Ole Miss^{†} | Neyland Stadium; Knoxville, TN (rivalry) | TBS | L 10–13 | 95,585 | |
| November 19 | at Kentucky | Commonwealth Stadium; Lexington, KY (rivalry) | CBS | W 10–0 | 57,985 | |
| November 26 | Vanderbilt | Neyland Stadium; Knoxville, TN | CBS | W 34–24 | 93,426 | |
| December 17 | vs. No. 16 Maryland* | Florida Citrus Bowl; Orlando, FL (Florida Citrus Bowl) | Mizlou | W 30–23 | 50,185 | |
*Non-conference game; ^{†}Homecoming; Rankings from AP Poll released prior to the game

== Roster ==
1983 Tennessee Volunteers football team roster
Players
Coaches
Offense

| Pos. | # | Name | Class |
|---|---|---|---|
| WR | 2 | Lenny Taylor | Sr |
| QB | 6 | Alan Cockrell | Jr |
| WR | 24 | Clyde Duncan | Sr |

Defense

| Pos. | # | Name | Class |
|---|---|---|---|
| LB | 71 | Darrin Miller | Fr |
| DE | 92 | Reggie White | Sr |
| DE | 97 | Tony Simmons | Jr |

Special teams

| Pos. | # | Name | Class |
|---|---|---|---|
| K | 4 | Fuad Reveiz | Jr |

Head coach

- Johnny Majors

Coordinators/assistant coaches

- Walt Harris – Offensive coordinator/quarterbacks
- Doug Mathews – Running backs
- Kippy Brown – Wide receivers
- David Cutcliffe – Tight ends
- Phillip Fulmer – Offensive line
- Larry Marmie – Defensive coordinator/inside linebackers
- Bill Shaw – Defensive line
- Mike Sweatman – Outside linebackers
- George Catavolos – Defensive backs
- Todd Berry – Graduate assistant
- Dennis Therrell – Graduate assistant

Legend

- (C) Team captain
- (S) Suspended
- (I) Ineligible
- Injured
- Redshirt

Roster

== Team players drafted into the NFL ==
The following players were selected in the 1984 NFL draft:

| Player | Position | Round | Pick | NFL club |
|---|---|---|---|---|
| Clyde Duncan | Wide Receiver | 1 | 17 | St. Louis Cardinals |
| Mark Studaway | Defensive End | 4 | 85 | Houston Oilers |
| Curt Singer | Tackle | 6 | 167 | Washington Redskins |
| Randall Morris | Fullback | 10 | 270 | Seattle Seahawks |
| Lenny Taylor | Wide Receiver | 12 | 313 | Green Bay Packers |
| Glenn Streno | Center | 12 | 327 | Detroit Lions |

The following players were selected in the 1984 NFL Supplemental Draft:

| Player | Position | Round | Pick | NFL club |
|---|---|---|---|---|
| Reggie White | Defensive End | 1 | 4 | Philadelphia Eagles |
