= Smithman Qualitative Index =

The Smithman Qualitative Soccer Index (SQS Index or Smithman Index) is a mathematical system for the ranking of amateur athletes in competitive football. The index ranks players by on both defensive (including goal tending) and offensive capabilities. It is an outgrowth of the work of Douglas et al. (1952) for the qualification of amateur sports competence.

== History ==
Until 1987, the standard method of displaying a score on the SQS Index was to use a complex number where the first value is the player's defensive capability score and the second (or complex) number is the offensive capability score. Between 1987 and 1989, the standard changed to place a colon or slash between the defensive and offensive capability score, the offensive score was also placed first in this standard (as opposed to previously, where it had been displayed second), leading to confusion.

After the 1989 season, the standard method of displaying the score was changed so the two separate scores are given and stated explicitly. This is much closer to the system suggested by Douglas et al. in their original paper.

The Index is based on each of 10 skills for each defensive and offensive capabilities with a possible score of -1 (under-developed) to 1 (outstanding) with gradations of 0.2 per skill, meaning each capability score ranges between -10 and 10.

Currently, many sports organizations prefer to present scores from 1 to 21, feeling that negative scores, or scores of zero are harmful to the development of amateur athletes.

Since 1990, the SQS Index has fallen out of favor in preference to simple report cards and other non-mathematical systems of competence reporting. The Ontario young amateur association of soccer coaches, players and officials has ceased the use of the Smithman Index for the beginning of the 1994 season.
