= 1983 Hall of Fame Classic =

West Virginia Mountaineers	Kentucky Wildcats
(8–3)	(6–4–1)
20	16
Head coach: Don Nehlen	Head coach: Jerry Claiborne
AP / Coaches; NR / 18
	1	2	3	4	Total
West Virginia	3	0	7	10	20
Kentucky	0	10	0	6	16
- Date: December 22, 1983
- Season: 1983
- Stadium: Legion Field
- Location: Birmingham, Alabama
- MVP: QB Jeff Hostetler (West Virginia)
- Favorite: West Virginia by 10
- Referee: Donald Safrit (ACC)
- Attendance: 42,000

United States TV coverage
- Network: WTBS
- Announcers: Bob Neal and Tim Foley

The 1983 Hall of Fame Classic Bowl was the sixth installment of the Hall of Fame Bowl. The game featured the Kentucky Wildcats of the Southeastern Conference and the West Virginia Mountaineers, then an independent. West Virginia was 8–3 entering the game and was ranked #18 in the AP poll at the time of the game; the Mountaineers had been ranked as high as #4 in the AP poll during the season. Kentucky was 6–4–1, 2–4 in the SEC. West Virginia was favored by 10 points over Kentucky.

West Virginia took a 3–0 lead in the first quarter when Paul Woodside kicked a 39-yard field goal. In the second quarter Kentucky capped an 8-play, 54-yard drive with a touchdown. On third down with three yards to go Kentucky's Tony Mayes swept right and threw back to quarterback Randy Jenkins in the left corner of the endzone for the score. John Hutcherson hit the point after for a 7–3 Kentucky lead. Jenkins guided another drive in the second quarter with a 19-yard pass completion to Joker Phillips and a 14-yard completion to George Adams that set up Hutcherson for a 32-yard field goal with 0:38 left in the period. The halftime score was Kentucky 10, West Virginia 3.

At the start of the second half Woodside recovered his own onside kick to give West Virginia possession at the Kentucky 48. Jeff Hostetler took wight plays before finding Rich Hollins for a 16-yard touchdown pass. Woodside's point after tied the game at 10–10 with 11:10 left in the third quarter.

West Virginia had two quick scores within two minutes of each other early in the fourth quarter. An 81-yard drive over 10 plays ended with Hostetler completing a 2-yard touchdown pass to Rob Bennett; the extra point gave West Virginia a 17–10 lead. Two plays later Jenkins threw an interception that gave the Mountaineers the ball at the Kentucky 16-yard line. Woodside hit a 23-yard field goal to give West Virginia a 20–10 lead with 9:18 left in the game.

Freshman quarterback Bill Ransdell replaced Jenkins and led Kentucky 92 yards in 11 plays, connecting with Joker Phillips on a 13-yard touchdown pass. The point after was unsuccessful, and with 5:50 left in the game West Virginia led 20–16; that was also the final score as Kentucky's final possession did not advance past the Kentucky 37.

In the final AP poll for the season West Virginia, finishing 9–3, was ranked #16.

Kentucky, a 10-point underdog, gained 306 yards to West Virginia's 288 (including 216 passing yards to West Virginia's 88) and had 19 first downs to West Virginia's 18.

Jeff Hostetler, who led West Virginia's 17 point second half comeback, later played for the New York Giants, Oakland Raiders and Washington Redskins. George Adams, who rushed for 75 yards in the game, was Hostetler's teammate with the New York Giants and also played for the New England Patriots. Joker Phillips also later played for the Washington Redskins. In 2002, Phillips became the offensive coordinator at Kentucky, and was named Head Coach-in-waiting following the 2007 season. He became the Head Football Coach at Kentucky following the retirement of Rich Brooks at the end of the 2009 season.

Kentucky returned to the same bowl the following year, defeating #20 Wisconsin 20–19.
