= 1984 Hall of Fame Classic =

Wisconsin Badgers	Kentucky Wildcats
(7–3–1)	(8–3)
19	20
Head coach: Dave McClain	Head coach: Jerry Claiborne
AP / Coaches; 20 / 17
	1	2	3	4	Total
Wisconsin	10	6	3	0	19
Kentucky	0	7	10	3	20
- Date: December 29, 1984
- Season: 1984
- Stadium: Legion Field
- Location: Birmingham, Alabama
- MVP: RB Mark Logan (Kentucky); PK Todd Gregoire (Wisconsin)
- Favorite: Wisconsin favored by 3
- Referee: Thomas Thamert (CIFOA)
- Attendance: 47,300

United States TV coverage
- Network: WTBS
- Announcers: Bob Neal and Tim Foley

The 1984 Hall of Fame Classic was the eighth edition of the Hall of Fame Classic. The game featured the Kentucky Wildcats of the Southeastern Conference and the Wisconsin Badgers of the Big Ten Conference. Wisconsin (7-3-1 entering the game, 5-3-1 in the Big Ten) was ranked #20 in the AP poll prior to the game. Kentucky (8–3, 3-3 SEC) had been ranked as high as #16 in the AP poll during the season but was unranked entering the game. Kentucky had appeared in the same bowl game the year before, losing to #16 West Virginia 20–16. Wisconsin was favored by 3 points over Kentucky.

Wisconsin scored twice to take a 10–0 lead at the end of the first quarter. Less than four minutes into the game Todd Gregoire hit a 40-yard field goal. Michael Howard then threw a 3-yard touchdown pass to Thad McFadden and Gregoire converted the extra point with 5:34 left in the first quarter.

In the second quarter Gregoire hit a 27-yard field goal with 7:05 left in the half to give Wisconsin a 13–0 lead. Then Howard threw a pass that was intercepted by Kentucky safety (and punter) Paul Calhoun. Kentucky took possession at the Wisconsin 42 and five plays later Marc Logan took the ball in from the Wisconsin 9 for a touchdown. Joey Worley connected on the PAT with 1:29 left in the first half to make it 13–7. Wisconsin then took the ball to the Kentucky 3, with 0:02 left in the half, on four running plays, two pass plays and a 15-yard penalty against Kentucky. Gregoire then hit a 20-yard field goal. The halftime score was Wisconsin 16, Kentucky 7.

With 11:28 left in the third quarter Worley hit a 22-yard field goal for Kentucky to make it 16-10 but two minutes later Gregoire hit a 40-yard field goal to keep Wisconsin ahead 19–10. Kentucky quarterback Bill Ransdell then led an 82-yard drive in 11 plays, culminating in a Ransdell to Logan screen pass for a 27-yard touchdown. Worley connected on the point after with 0:26 left in the third quarter to make it Wisconsin 19, Kentucky 17.

Kentucky's next possession began on its own 22. Running back Mark Higgs took handoffs on four consecutive plays, and then running back George Adams took handoffs on four consecutive plays. in the fourth quarter Wisconsin's defense was unable to stop the two NFL-bound backs. Kentucky eventually ended up with the ball on the Wisconsin 34 on fourth down with two yards to go. Worley connected on a 52-yard field goal with 8:55 left in the game to put Kentucky ahead for the first time, 20–19. Wisconsin then drove to the Kentucky 8 with under two minutes left in the game. On fourth down and 6 yards to go Gregoire took the field for his fifth field goal attempt of the game but the snap was bobbled and Kentucky then ran out the clock for the win.

Joker Phillips, then a Kentucky wide receiver and later Kentucky's head football coach, had 6 receptions for 55 yards in the game; Kentucky quarterback Bill Ransdell connected on 18 of 34 passes for 188 yards.

== Aftermath ==
In the final AP poll for the season Wisconsin, finishing 7–4–1, dropped out from its #20 ranking; Kentucky, at 9–3, advanced to finish the season ranked #19. Kentucky also finished the season ranked #19 in the UPI Poll.
