= 1983 Florida Gators football team =

American college football season

1983 Florida Gators football

Gator Bowl, W 14–6 vs. Iowa
- Conference: Southeastern Conference

Ranking
- Coaches: No. 6
- AP: No. 6
- Record: 9–2–1 (4–2 SEC)
- Head coach: Charley Pell (5th season)
- Offensive coordinator: Mike Shanahan (4th season)
- Defensive coordinator: Joe Kines (3rd season)
- Home stadium: Florida Field

1983 Southeastern Conference football standings
	Conf.					Overall
Team	W		L		T	W		L		T
No. 3 Auburn $	6	–	0	–	0	11	–	1	–	0
No. 4 Georgia	5	–	1	–	0	10	–	1	–	1
No. 6 Florida	4	–	2	–	0	9	–	2	–	1
Tennessee	4	–	2	–	0	9	–	3	–	0
No. 15 Alabama	4	–	2	–	0	8	–	4	–	0
Ole Miss	4	–	2	–	0	6	–	6	–	0
Kentucky	2	–	4	–	0	6	–	5	–	1
Mississippi State	1	–	5	–	0	3	–	8	–	0
LSU	0	–	6	–	0	4	–	7	–	0
Vanderbilt	0	–	6	–	0	2	–	9	–	0
$ – Conference champion; Rankings from AP Poll

The 1983 Florida Gators football team represented the University of Florida during the 1983 NCAA Division I-A football season. The season was Charley Pell's fifth as the head coach of the Florida Gators football team. Pell's Gators posted a 9–2–1 overall record and a Southeastern Conference (SEC) record of 4–2, placing third among ten SEC teams. Behind a stout defense and a rushing attack led by future pros Neal Anderson, John L. Williams, and Lorenzo Hampton the 1983 Gators were the first squad in program history to be ranked among the top ten teams in the final Associated Press (AP) poll. It was also the second time that the Gators were ranked in every weekly AP Poll throughout the season, (1975 being the first).

== Schedule ==
Date	Opponent	Rank	Site	TV	Result	Attendance	Source
September 3	Miami (FL)*		Florida Field; Gainesville, FL (rivalry)		W 28–3	73,907	
September 10	at No. 9 USC*	No. 18	Los Angeles Memorial Coliseum; Los Angeles, CA		T 19–19	53,948	
September 17	Indiana State*	No. 15	Florida Field; Gainesville, FL		W 17–13	68,191	
September 24	at Mississippi State	No. 15	Scott Field; Starkville, MS		W 35–12	31,875	
October 1	at No. 16 LSU	No. 12	Tiger Stadium; Baton Rouge, LA (rivalry)		W 31–17	78,616	
October 8	Vanderbilt	No. 9	Florida Field; Gainesville, FL		W 29–10	73,764	
October 22	East Carolina*^{†}	No. 6	Florida Field; Gainesville, FL		W 24–17	73,943	
October 29	at No. 4 Auburn	No. 5	Jordan-Hare Stadium; Auburn, AL (rivalry)	CBS	L 21–28	75,700	
November 5	vs. No. 4 Georgia	No. 9	Gator Bowl Stadium; Jacksonville, FL (rivalry)	CBS	L 9–10	82,166	
November 12	Kentucky	No. 14	Florida Field; Gainesville, FL (rivalry)		W 24–7	73,192	
December 3	Florida State*	No. 12	Florida Field; Gainesville, FL (rivalry)	CBS	W 53–14	74,113	
December 30	vs. No. 10 Iowa*	No. 11	Gator Bowl Stadium; Jacksonville, FL (Gator Bowl)	ABC	W 14–6	81,293	
*Non-conference game; ^{†}Homecoming; Rankings from AP Poll released prior to the game

== Roster ==
1983 Florida Gators football team roster
Players
Coaches
Offense

Pos.	#	Name	Class
RB	27	Neal Anderson	So
WR	89	Ricky Nattiel	Fr
QB	15	Wayne Peace	Sr
FB	22	John L. Williams	So

Defense

Pos.	#	Name	Class
S	18	Tony Lilly	Sr
LB	88	Wilber Marshall	Sr

Special teams

Pos.	#	Name	Class
K		Bobby Raymond	Jr

Head coach

- Charley Pell

Coordinators/assistant coaches

- Mike Shanahan (OC)
- Joe Kines (DC)
- Mike Heimerdinger (WR)
- Vince Kendrick (RB)
- Charlie Strong (GA)

Legend

- (C) Team captain
- (S) Suspended
- (I) Ineligible
- Injured
- Redshirt

== Team players in the 1984 NFL draft ==
Player	Position	Round	Pick	NFL club
Wilber Marshall	Linebacker	1	11	Chicago Bears
Tony Lilly	Safety	3	78	Denver Broncos
Randy Clark	Defensive back	8	202	Kansas City Chiefs
John Hunt	Guard	9	232	Dallas Cowboys
