= 1983 Alabama Crimson Tide football team =

American college football season

1983 Alabama Crimson Tide football

Sun Bowl champion

Sun Bowl, W 28–7 vs. SMU
- Conference: Southeastern Conference

Ranking
- Coaches: No. 12
- AP: No. 15
- Record: 8–4 (4–2 SEC)
- Head coach: Ray Perkins (1st season)
- Offensive coordinator: George Henshaw (1st season)
- Offensive scheme: Pro-style
- Defensive coordinator: Ken Donahue (10th season)
- Base defense: 5-2
- Captains: Walter Lewis; Randy Edwards
- Home stadium: Bryant–Denny Stadium; Legion Field

1983 Southeastern Conference football standings
	Conf.					Overall
Team	W		L		T	W		L		T
No. 3 Auburn $	6	–	0	–	0	11	–	1	–	0
No. 4 Georgia	5	–	1	–	0	10	–	1	–	1
No. 6 Florida	4	–	2	–	0	9	–	2	–	1
Tennessee	4	–	2	–	0	9	–	3	–	0
No. 15 Alabama	4	–	2	–	0	8	–	4	–	0
Ole Miss	4	–	2	–	0	6	–	6	–	0
Kentucky	2	–	4	–	0	6	–	5	–	1
Mississippi State	1	–	5	–	0	3	–	8	–	0
LSU	0	–	6	–	0	4	–	7	–	0
Vanderbilt	0	–	6	–	0	2	–	9	–	0
$ – Conference champion; Rankings from AP Poll

The 1983 Alabama Crimson Tide football team (variously "Alabama", "UA", "Bama" or "The Tide") represented the University of Alabama in the 1983 NCAA Division I-A football season. It was the Crimson Tide's 89th overall and 50th season as a member of the Southeastern Conference (SEC). The team was led by head coach Ray Perkins, in his first year, and played their home games at both Bryant–Denny Stadium in Tuscaloosa and Legion Field in Birmingham, Alabama. They finished the season with a record of eight wins and four losses (8–4overall, 4–2 in the SEC). Ray Perkins, who played as a wide receiver for Bear Bryant in the 1960s, was named as the new head coach at Alabama on December 14, 1982, to succeed Bryant after his 26-year tenure as Alabama's head coach.

Bryant, who intended to remain Alabama's athletic director, died from a massive heart attack in Tuscaloosa on January 26, 1983.

After opening the season with four consecutive wins and rising to #3 in the AP poll, The Tide suffered a controversial 34–28 loss to Penn State. Trailing 34–6 entering the 4th quarter, Alabama rallied and seemed to be an extra point away from victory after tight end Preston Gothard appeared to catch a game-tying touchdown pass with eight seconds left in the game. One official signaled a touchdown but was overruled by the back judge who ruled Gothard was out of bounds. Video replay indicated otherwise, however instant replay in college football was still over two decades away. Bama avenged the previous year's losses to LSU and Southern Miss but lost to Tennessee and Auburn again. The Crimson Tide completed their season with a 28–7 victory over No. 6 SMU in the Sun Bowl.

== Schedule ==
Date	Time	Opponent	Rank	Site	TV	Result	Attendance	Source
September 10	1:30 p.m.	Georgia Tech*	No. 14	Legion Field; Birmingham, AL (rivalry)		W 20–7	77,413	
September 17	1:30 p.m.	Ole Miss	No. 12	Bryant–Denny Stadium; Tuscaloosa, AL (rivalry)		W 40–0	60,210	
September 24	7:00 p.m.	at Vanderbilt	No. 6	Vanderbilt Stadium; Nashville, TN		W 44–24	41,418	
October 1	1:30 p.m.	Memphis State*^{†}	No. 6	Bryant–Denny Stadium; Tuscaloosa, AL		W 44–13	60,210	
October 8	2:30 p.m.	at Penn State*	No. 3	Beaver Stadium; University Park, PA (rivalry)	CBS	L 28–34	85,614	
October 15	1:30 p.m.	Tennessee	No. 11	Legion Field; Birmingham, AL (Third Saturday in October)		L 34–41	77,237	
October 29	1:30 p.m.	Mississippi State	No. 18	Bryant–Denny Stadium; Tuscaloosa, AL (rivalry)		W 35–18	60,210	
November 5	11:30 a.m.	at LSU	No. 19	Tiger Stadium; Baton Rouge, LA (rivalry)	ABC	W 32–26	70,606	
November 12	1:30 p.m.	Southern Miss*	No. 16	Legion Field; Birmingham, AL		W 28–16	74,424	
November 25	12:30 p.m.	at No. 15 Boston College*	No. 13	Sullivan Stadium; Foxboro, MA	CBS	L 13–20	58,047	
December 3	2:30 p.m.	vs. No. 3 Auburn	No. 19	Legion Field; Birmingham, AL (Iron Bowl)	ABC	L 20–23	77,310	
December 24	2:00 p.m.	vs. No. 6 SMU*		Sun Bowl; El Paso, TX (Sun Bowl)	CBS	W 28–7	41,412	
*Non-conference game; ^{†}Homecoming; Rankings from AP Poll released prior to the game; All times are in Central time
