= 1983 Georgia Bulldogs football team =

American college football season

1983 Georgia Bulldogs football

Cotton Bowl Classic champion

Cotton Bowl Classic, W 10–9 vs. Texas
- Conference: Southeastern Conference

Ranking
- Coaches: No. 4
- AP: No. 4
- Record: 10–1–1 (5–1 SEC)
- Head coach: Vince Dooley (20th season)
- Offensive coordinator: George Haffner (4th season)
- Defensive coordinator: Bill Lewis (3rd season)
- Home stadium: Sanford Stadium

1983 Southeastern Conference football standings
	Conf.					Overall
Team	W		L		T	W		L		T
No. 3 Auburn $	6	–	0	–	0	11	–	1	–	0
No. 4 Georgia	5	–	1	–	0	10	–	1	–	1
No. 6 Florida	4	–	2	–	0	9	–	2	–	1
Tennessee	4	–	2	–	0	9	–	3	–	0
No. 15 Alabama	4	–	2	–	0	8	–	4	–	0
Ole Miss	4	–	2	–	0	6	–	6	–	0
Kentucky	2	–	4	–	0	6	–	5	–	1
Mississippi State	1	–	5	–	0	3	–	8	–	0
LSU	0	–	6	–	0	4	–	7	–	0
Vanderbilt	0	–	6	–	0	2	–	9	–	0
$ – Conference champion; Rankings from AP Poll

The 1983 Georgia Bulldogs football team represented the University of Georgia as a member of the Southeastern Conference (SEC) during the 1983 NCAA Division I-A football season. Led by 20th-year head coach Vince Dooley, the Bulldogs compiled an overall record of 10–1–1, with a mark of 5–1 in conference play, and finished second in the SEC.

== Schedule ==
Date	Opponent	Rank	Site	TV	Result	Attendance	Source
September 3	No. 20 UCLA*	No. 15	Sanford Stadium; Athens, GA	ABC	W 19–8	82,122	
September 17	at Clemson*	No. 11	Memorial Stadium; Clemson, SC (rivalry)		T 16–16	79,815	
September 24	South Carolina*	No. 14	Sanford Stadium; Athens, GA (rivalry)		W 31–13	82,122	
October 1	Mississippi State	No. 11	Sanford Stadium; Athens, GA		W 20–7	82,122	
October 8	at Ole Miss	No. 11	Vaught–Hemingway Stadium; Oxford, MS		W 36–11	29,362	
October 15	at Vanderbilt	No. 8	Vanderbilt Stadium; Nashville, TN (rivalry)		W 20–13	41,223	
October 22	Kentucky	No. 7	Sanford Stadium; Athens, GA		W 47–21	82,122	
October 29	Temple*^{†}	No. 6	Sanford Stadium; Athens, GA		W 31–14	81,822	
November 5	vs. No. 9 Florida	No. 4	Gator Bowl Stadium; Jacksonville, FL (rivalry)	CBS	W 10–9	82,166	
November 12	No. 3 Auburn	No. 4	Sanford Stadium; Athens, GA (rivalry)	ABC	L 7–13	82,122	
November 26	at Georgia Tech*	No. 7	Grant Field; Atlanta, GA (rivalry)		W 27–24	59,113	
January 2, 1984	vs. No. 2 Texas*	No. 7	Cotton Bowl; Dallas, TX (Cotton Bowl Classic)	CBS	W 10–9	67,891	
*Non-conference game; ^{†}Homecoming; Rankings from AP Poll released prior to the game

== Roster ==
1983 Georgia Bulldogs football team roster
Players
Coaches
Offense

Pos.	#	Name	Class
QB		John Lastinger
QB	15	Todd Williams	So

Defense

Pos.	#	Name	Class

Special teams

Pos.	#	Name	Class
K	5	Kevin Butler	Jr

Head coach

- Vince Dooley

Coordinators/assistant coaches

Legend

- (C) Team captain
- (S) Suspended
- (I) Ineligible
- Injured
- Redshirt

== Rankings ==
Ranking movements Legend: ██ Increase in ranking ██ Decrease in ranking ( ) = First-place votes
	Week															
Poll	Pre	1	2	3	4	5	6	7	8	9	10	11	12	13	14	Final
AP	15	10	11	14	11	11	8	7	6	4	4	7	7	7	7	4
Coaches	13 (1)	7	7	11	8	8	6	7	6	4	4	7	7	7	7	4
