= 1983 Independence Bowl =

Air Force Falcons	Ole Miss Rebels
(9–2)	(6-5)
WAC	SEC
9	3
Head coach: Ken Hatfield	Head coach: Billy Brewer
AP / Coaches; 16 / 16
	1	2	3	4	Total
Air Force	3	3	3	0	9
Ole Miss	0	3	0	0	3
- Date: December 10, 1983
- Season: 1983
- Stadium: Independence Stadium
- Location: Shreveport, Louisiana
- MVP: QB Marty Louthan, Air Force; DT Andre Townsend, Ole Miss
- Referee: Raymond Bower (CIFOA)
- Attendance: 41,274

United States TV coverage
- Network: Mizlou
- Announcers: Howard David; Ken Willard; Steve Grad

The 1983 Independence Bowl was a college football postseason bowl game between the Ole Miss Rebels and the Air Force Falcons.

== Background ==
The Rebels tied for 3rd in the Southeastern Conference, in their first bowl appearance since 1971. The Falcons had finished 2nd in the Western Athletic Conference, but they were making their 2nd straight bowl game, the first time they had made consecutive bowl games in school history. This was the first Independence Bowl for either team.

== Game summary ==
In a rain drenched game, the Falcons led 6-0 on two field goals by Sean Pavlich from 44 and 39 yards out. Ole Miss halved the lead on 39 yarder from Neil Teevan in the 3rd, but Pavlich's 27 yarder in the same quarter proved to be the last score of the game. Marty Louthan went 6-of-7 for 71 yards, and Mike Brown ran for 91 yards on 12 carries for the Falcons. In a losing effort, Buford McGee rushed 22 times for 111 yards and Kelly Powell threw 11-of-27 for 138 yards, with 2 interceptions.

== Aftermath ==
Hatfield left for Arkansas after the bowl game, though the Falcons continued to prosper under new coach Fisher DeBerry, making four more bowl games in the decade. The Rebels made two more in the decade and two more before Brewer left due to violations in 1993. Air Force returned to the Independence Bowl the following year while Ole Miss returned in 1986.

The Rebels gained revenge for this loss by defeating the Falcons 42-29 in the 1989 Liberty Bowl.

== Statistics ==
Statistics	Air Force	Ole Miss
First downs	18	11
Rushing yards	277	106
Passing yards	71	138
Interceptions	0	2
Total yards	348	244
Fumbles–lost	3–3	1–0
Penalties–yards	4–19	4–20
Punts–average	3–30.3	5–43.6
