= Jerry Claiborne =

American football player and coach (1928–2000)

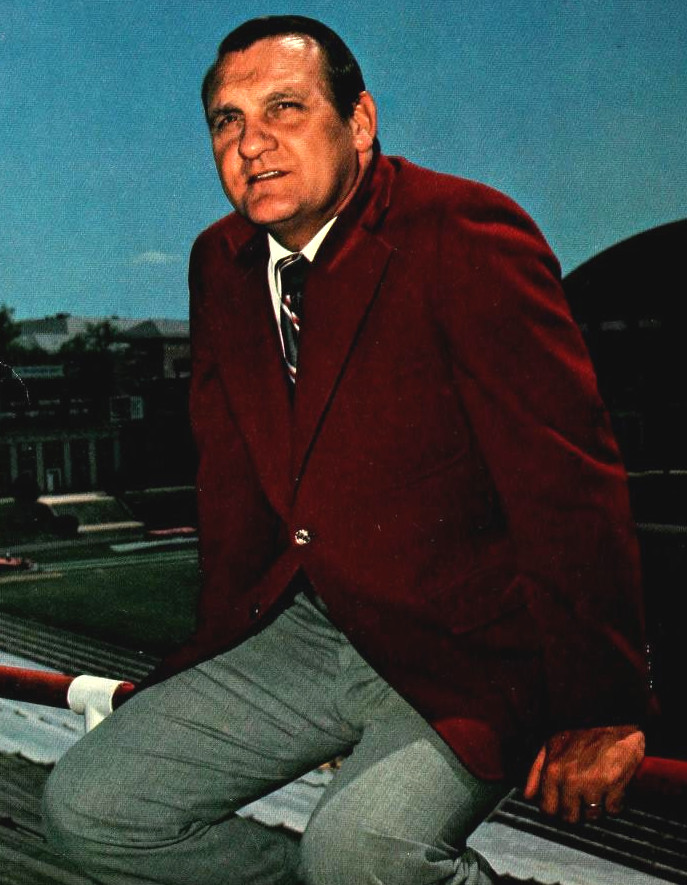
- Claiborne, c. 1975

Biographical details
- Born: August 26, 1928; Hopkinsville, Kentucky, U.S.
- Died: September 24, 2000 (aged 72); Nashville, Tennessee, U.S.

Playing career
- 1946: Kentucky
- 1948–1949: Kentucky
- Position: Halfback

Coaching career (HC unless noted)
- 1950–1951: Augusta Military Academy (VA)
- 1952–1953: Kentucky (assistant)
- 1954–1956: Texas A&M (assistant)
- 1957: Missouri (assistant)
- 1958–1960: Alabama (assistant)
- 1961–1970: Virginia Tech
- 1971: Colorado (DC)
- 1972–1981: Maryland
- 1982–1989: Kentucky
- 1992: Braunschweig Lions

Head coaching record
- Overall: 179–122–8
- Bowls: 3–8

Accomplishments and honors

Championships
- 1 SoCon (1963); 3 ACC (1974–1976)

Awards
- Sporting News College Football COY (1974); 3× ACC Coach of the Year (1973, 1975–1976); SEC Coach of the Year (1983)
- College Football Hall of Fame; Inducted in 1999 (profile)

Jerry David Claiborne (August 26, 1928 – September 24, 2000) was an American college football player and coach. He was the head football coach at Virginia Tech (1961–1970), the University of Maryland, College Park (1972–1981), and his alma mater, the University of Kentucky (1982–1989), compiling a career head coaching record of 179–122–8 (.592). Claiborne was inducted into the College Football Hall of Fame as a coach in 1999.

== Early years ==
Claiborne attended the Hopkinsville High School and the University of Kentucky and was named the College of Education's Outstanding Senior. Claiborne played halfback under legendary coach Paul "Bear" Bryant at the University of Kentucky.

In 1950, he became the head football and basketball coach at Augusta Military Academy in Fort Defiance, Augusta County, Virginia. His teams won the Virginia State basketball championship in 1950 and the football championship in 1951. The following year, he left to become Bryant's assistant coach at Kentucky, following Bryant in the same capacity to Texas A&M and Alabama before he moved up to become a head coach.

== Head coach ==
=== Virginia Tech ===
Claiborne was head coach at Virginia Polytechnic Institute from 1961 through 1970, with an overall record of 61–39–2 (.608). Claiborne's legacy was carried on by Frank Beamer, who played for Claiborne at Virginia Tech. Beamer built the program into a powerhouse in the mid-1990s. Claiborne's contributions to Tech's football program earned him a place in the Virginia Tech Sports Hall of Fame.

For one season in 1971, Claiborne was the defensive coordinator (and assistant head coach) at the University of Colorado under Eddie Crowder. The third-ranked Buffaloes went 10–2, behind the teams they lost to (both on the road): undefeated national champion Nebraska and #2 Oklahoma, an unprecedented sweep of the top three slots by the Big Eight Conference.

=== Maryland ===
When Claiborne was hired at the University of Maryland in December 1971, the Terrapins had only won nine games in the previous five seasons. Claiborne led the Terps to a winning season after only his second year with the team. He posted a 77–37–3 (.671) record in his decade at Maryland, including an undefeated regular season in 1976, before losing to Houston in the Cotton Bowl. For six consecutive seasons beginning in 1973, the Terrapins appeared in bowl games, and added another in 1980. During this run, Maryland won three straight ACC titles (1974, 1975, 1976).

=== Kentucky ===
In December 1981, Claiborne followed in the footsteps of Bear Bryant and went from College Park to Lexington, Kentucky; the home of the University of Kentucky. In Claiborne's case, Kentucky was his alma mater. UK had incurred four straight losing seasons and offered Claiborne the position largely to help clean up a program racked by numerous recruiting violations during the tenure of previous head coach Fran Curci.

After starting with a winless record of 0–10–1 in 1982, Claiborne reached bowl games in his next two seasons, posting records of 6–5–1 in 1983 and 9–3 in 1984, after which the Wildcats were ranked nineteenth in the final AP poll. The Wildcats' win in the Hall of Fame Classic over Wisconsin was UK's last bowl win for 22 years, until the Music City Bowl victory over Clemson in 2006. Claiborne did not get to another bowl, getting no closer than 5–5–1 in 1986 and 6–5 in 1989, and then retired. Due in part to his role in cleaning up the program's image, he remained in the good graces of Kentucky fans; his eight-season record was 41–46–3 (.472).

=== Europe ===
In 1992, Claiborne became the head coach of the Braunschweig Lions, then a German Division II Football team in Germany. During his one-year stay he laid the foundation for an organization that became a European football powerhouse.

== Significant achievements ==
- Claiborne coached four Academic All-Americans and eighty-seven all-conference academics.
- Named the nation's Coach of the Year by the Sporting News in 1974.
- Named Southeastern Conference Coach of the Year in 1983.
- Claiborne's Kentucky team won the College Football Association Academic Achievement Award for the highest graduation rate of 90% in 1989.
- The University of Kentucky named Claiborne into its Alumni Hall of Fame in 1992.
- In 1994, Claiborne received the Neyland Trophy, which is presented annually to a coach "who has contributed greatly to intercollegiate athletics"
- In 1999 the Lexington, Kentucky's chapter of the National Football Foundation was named after Claiborne.
- Retired with a lifetime record of 179–122–8, ranking him fourth among active college coaches in victories when he retired.

== Head coaching record ==
Year	Team	Overall	Conference	Standing	Bowl/playoffs	Coaches^{#}	AP^{°}
Virginia Tech Gobblers (Southern Conference) (1961–1964)
1961	Virginia Tech	4–5	2–3	7th			
1962	Virginia Tech	5–5	2–3	6th			
1963	Virginia Tech	8–2	5–0	1st			
1964	Virginia Tech	6–4	3–1	2nd			
Virginia Tech Gobblers (NCAA University Division independent) (1965–1970)
1965	Virginia Tech	7–3					
1966	Virginia Tech	8–2–1			L Liberty	20	
1967	Virginia Tech	7–3					
1968	Virginia Tech	7–4			L Liberty		
1969	Virginia Tech	4–5–1					
1970	Virginia Tech	5–6					
Virginia Tech:		61–39–2	12–7				
Maryland Terrapins (Atlantic Coast Conference) (1972–1981)
1972	Maryland	5–5–1	3–2–1	3rd			
1973	Maryland	8–4	5–1	2nd	L Peach	18	20
1974	Maryland	8–4	6–0	1st	L Liberty	13	13
1975	Maryland	9–2–1	5–0	1st	W Gator	11	13
1976	Maryland	11–1	5–0	1st	L Cotton	11	8
1977	Maryland	8–4	4–2	T–3rd	W Hall of Fame Classic		
1978	Maryland	9–3	5–1	2nd	L Sun		20
1979	Maryland	7–4	4–2	T–2nd			
1980	Maryland	8–4	5–1	2nd	L Tangerine		
1981	Maryland	4–6–1	4–2	3rd			
Maryland:		77–37–3	46–11–1				
Kentucky Wildcats (Southeastern Conference) (1982–1989)
1982	Kentucky	0–10–1	0–6	T–8th			
1983	Kentucky	6–5–1	2–4	4th	L Hall of Fame Classic		
1984	Kentucky	9–3	3–3	T–4th	W Hall of Fame Classic	19	19
1985	Kentucky	5–6	1–5	7th			
1986	Kentucky	5–5–1	2–4	T–4th			
1987	Kentucky	5–6	1–5	T–7th			
1988	Kentucky	5–6	2–5	T–8th			
1989	Kentucky	6–5	2–5	T–7th			
Kentucky:		41–46–3	13–37				
Total:		179–122–8					
National championship Conference title Conference division title or championship game berth
^{#}Rankings from final Coaches Poll.; ^{°}Rankings from final AP Poll.

== See also ==
- List of presidents of the American Football Coaches Association
