= 1983 Florida Citrus Bowl =

American college football game

1983 Florida Citrus Growers Association Florida Citrus Bowl
Maryland Terrapins	Tennessee Volunteers
(8–3)	(8–3)
ACC	SEC
23	30
Head coach: Bobby Ross	Head coach: Johnny Majors
AP / Coaches; 17 / 15
	1	2	3	4	Total
Maryland	3	6	11	3	23
Tennessee	7	3	6	14	30
- Date: December 17, 1983
- Season: 1983
- Stadium: Florida Citrus Bowl
- Location: Orlando, Florida
- MVP: RB Johnnie Jones (Tennessee)
- Referee: Paul Schmitt (SICOA)
- Attendance: 50,500

United States TV coverage
- Network: ESPN/Mizlou
- Announcers: Howard David, Lee Corso and Duane Dow

The 1983 Florida Citrus Bowl was an American college football bowl game played on December 17, 1983 at Florida Citrus Bowl in Orlando, Florida. The game pitted the Tennessee Volunteers and the Maryland Terrapins.

== Background ==
=== Tennessee ===
Tennessee started the season 1-2, with a win over New Mexico and losses to #10 Pittsburgh and #11 Auburn (all at home). The Volunteers promptly won the next five games, including a road victory at #11 Alabama. A loss to Ole Miss was followed by victories over Kentucky and Vanderbilt to end the season tied for third place with Florida in the Southeastern Conference. This was Tennessee's third straight bowl season.

=== Maryland ===
Maryland began the season ranked #17, and they opened the season with a win over SEC opponent Vanderbilt. A loss to #20 West Virginia dropped them out of the polls, but the Terrapins won the next six games (with highlight wins over #17 Pittsburgh and #3 North Carolina), rising up to #7 in the polls. However, the Terps lost their next two games (to #3 Auburn and #17 Clemson), though they finished the season with a win over North Carolina State. Due to Clemson (who won all seven of their ACC games) being on probation for recruiting violations, Maryland (who finished 5-1 in ACC play) was declared the champion of the Atlantic Coast Conference. This was their first ACC title since 1976. This was their fourth straight bowl season.

=== Bowl ===
After 37 Tangerine Bowls, this was the first time that the game was played under the Florida Citrus moniker, accompanying the newly named stadium with the same name, which had been known as "Orlando Stadium" from 1977 to 1982.

== Game summary ==
- Maryland – Jess Atkinson 18 yard field goal
- Tennessee – Lenny Taylor 12 yard touchdown pass from Alan Cockrell (Reveiz kick)
- Maryland – Jess Atkinson 48 yard field goal
- Maryland – Jess Atkinson 31 yard field goal
- Tennessee – Fuad Reveiz 25 yard field goal
- Maryland – Jess Atkinson 22 yard field goal
- Tennessee – Sam Henderson 19 yard touchdown run (Pass failed)
- Maryland – Rick Badanjek 3 yard touchdown run (Badjanek run)
- Tennessee – Johnnie Jones 1 yard touchdown run (Reveiz kick)
- Tennessee – Johnnie Jones 2 yard touchdown run (Reveiz kick)
- Maryland – Jess Atkinson 26 yard field goal

The Vols beat the Terps on the ground and in the turnover department, with Boomer Esiason getting injured after only six passes, which led to Frank Reich taking over. Johnnie Jones rushed for 154 yards on 29 carries with two touchdowns, while Alan Cockrell threw 16-of-23 for 185 yards and one touchdown. Alvin Toles recovered a fumble and intercepted a Frank Reich pass, with both leading to scores by Tennessee. Tennessee had 25 first downs to Maryland's 17, while having 201 rushing yards and 185 passing yards, while Maryland had 95 rushing yards and 253 passing yards. Both teams turned the ball over twice. There was only one punt (by Tennessee), which went for 47 yards. The possession time was won by Tennessee, by 12 seconds. Reich went 14-of-22 for 192 yards with one interception. Jess Atkinson kicked five field goals for Maryland.

== Aftermath ==
Tennessee would continue to reach bowl games, reaching four in the next four years (along with a SEC title). They did not come back to the Florida Citrus Bowl again until 1994. Maryland reached bowls in the next two seasons, though those would be the last for the rest of the decade. They have not reached the Citrus Bowl since this game.
