= 1983 Kentucky Wildcats football team =

American college football season

1983 Kentucky Wildcats football

Hall of Fame Classic Bowl, L 20–16 vs. West Virginia
- Conference: Southeastern Conference
- Record: 6–5–1 (2–4 SEC)
- Head coach: Jerry Claiborne (1st season)
- Home stadium: Commonwealth Stadium

1983 Southeastern Conference football standings
	Conf.					Overall
Team	W		L		T	W		L		T
No. 3 Auburn $	6	–	0	–	0	11	–	1	–	0
No. 4 Georgia	5	–	1	–	0	10	–	1	–	1
No. 6 Florida	4	–	2	–	0	9	–	2	–	1
Tennessee	4	–	2	–	0	9	–	3	–	0
No. 15 Alabama	4	–	2	–	0	8	–	4	–	0
Ole Miss	4	–	2	–	0	6	–	6	–	0
Kentucky	2	–	4	–	0	6	–	5	–	1
Mississippi State	1	–	5	–	0	3	–	8	–	0
LSU	0	–	6	–	0	4	–	7	–	0
Vanderbilt	0	–	6	–	0	2	–	9	–	0
$ – Conference champion; Rankings from AP Poll

The 1983 Kentucky Wildcats football team represented the University of Kentucky as a member of the Southeastern Conference (SEC) during the 1983 NCAA Division I-A football season. Led by first-year head coach Jerry Claiborne, the Wildcats scored 228 points while allowing 237 points.

After a 4–0 start, Kentucky finished the regular season 6–4–1 before playing in the 1983 Hall of Fame Classic and losing to No 18 West Virginia, 20–16. The improvement from 1982's 0–10–1 mark was, at the time, an NCAA record for most improvement in wins from one season to the next.

== Schedule ==
Date	Opponent	Site	Result	Attendance	Source
September 3	Central Michigan*	Commonwealth Stadium; Lexington, KY	W 31–14	51,232	
September 10	Kansas State*	Commonwealth Stadium; Lexington, KY	W 31–12	56,123	
September 17	Indiana*	Commonwealth Stadium; Lexington, KY (rivalry)	W 24–13	56,825	
September 24	Tulane*	Commonwealth Stadium; Lexington, KY	W 26–14	57,424	
October 8	No. 7 Auburn	Commonwealth Stadium; Lexington, KY	L 21–49	57,989	
October 15	LSU	Tiger Stadium; Baton Rouge, LA	W 21–13	77,765	
October 22	at No. 7 Georgia	Sanford Stadium; Athens, GA	L 21–47	82,122	
October 29	Cincinnati*	Commonwealth Stadium; Lexington, KY	T 13–13	57,789	
November 5	at Vanderbilt	Vanderbilt Stadium; Nashville, TN (rivalry)	W 17–8	41,000	
November 12	at No. 14 Florida	Florida Field; Gainesville, FL (rivalry)	L 7–24	73,192	
November 19	Tennessee	Commonwealth Stadium; Lexington, KY (rivalry)	L 0–10	57,985	
December 22	vs. No. 18 West Virginia*	Legion Field; Birmingham, AL (Hall of Fame Classic)	L 20–16	42,000	
*Non-conference game; Rankings from AP Poll released prior to the game

== Roster ==
1983 Kentucky Wildcats football team roster
Players
Coaches
Offense

Pos.	#	Name	Class
[[American football positions|]]
[[American football positions|]]

Defense

Pos.	#	Name	Class
[[American football positions|]]

Special teams

Pos.	#	Name	Class

Head coach

Coordinators/assistant coaches

Legend

- (C) Team captain
- (S) Suspended
- (I) Ineligible
- Injured
- Redshirt

== Team players in the 1984 NFL draft ==
Player	Position	Round	Pick	NFL club
John Grimsley	Linebacker	6	141	Houston Oilers
