= 1984 Rose Bowl =

American college football game

- 70th Rose Bowl Game
| UCLA Bruins | Illinois Fighting Illini |
| (6–4–1) | (10–1) |
| 45 | 9 |
| Head coach: Terry Donahue | Head coach: Mike White |
| | AP / Coaches; 4 / 5 |
| | 1 | 2 | 3 | 4 | Total |
|---|---|---|---|---|---|
| UCLA | 7 | 21 | 10 | 7 | 45 |
| Illinois | 0 | 3 | 0 | 6 | 9 |
- Date: January 2, 1984
- Season: 1983
- Stadium: Rose Bowl
- Location: Pasadena, California
- MVP: Rick Neuheisel (UCLA QB)
- Favorite: Illinois by 4½ points
- National anthem: UCLA's The Solid Gold Sound Band
- Referee: John Nealon (Big Ten) (split crew: Big Ten, Pac-10)
- Halftime show: UCLA's The Solid Gold Sound Band and Marching Illini
- Attendance: 103,217

United States TV coverage
- Network: NBC
- Announcers: Dick Enberg, Merlin Olsen

The 1984 Rose Bowl game, played on Monday, January 2, was the 70th edition. The unranked UCLA Bruins upset the #4 Illinois Fighting Illini by a score of 45–9.

Rick Neuheisel, UCLA quarterback, was named the Player of the Game. He completed 22 of 32 passes for 298 yards and four touchdowns. Neuheisel, who later became UCLA's head coach, threw two touchdown passes to his eventual predecessor, Karl Dorrell. As New Year's Day fell on a Sunday in 1984, the game was played the following day.

This was the third consecutive Rose Bowl win for the Pac-10, with nine wins in the last ten.

== Teams ==
See also 1983 NCAA Division I-A football season

=== Illinois Fighting Illini ===
Illinois opened the 1983 season with a loss to Missouri. The Illini then swept through the rest of their games including a 33-0 defeat of #4 Iowa, a 17–13 win over #6 Ohio State, and a 16–6 win over #8 Michigan. They became the first team in Big Ten Conference history to defeat all nine of their conference opponents. This was the fourth appearance for the Illini in the Rose Bowl, with previous appearances in the 1947 Rose Bowl, 1952 Rose Bowl, and 1964 Rose Bowl. The Illini were 3–0 in Rose Bowl appearances.

=== UCLA Bruins ===
The Bruins had won the year before in 1983 Rose Bowl against the Michigan Wolverines. The Bruins had a 3–5 record in previous Rose Bowl games. This was the second season for the Bruins with the Rose Bowl stadium as their home stadium. UCLA opened the season with a loss at Georgia, a tie with Arizona State and then a 42–10 loss at #1-ranked Nebraska. Starting quarterback Rick Neuheisel was benched after the Nebraska loss in favor of Steve Bono. On October 1, the Bruins lost to BYU to start the season 0–3–1. Bono was injured during the BYU game, and Neuheisel came back to finish the season. The Bruins then won five straight Pacific-10 Conference games, including a defeat of #11 Washington. The Bruins then lost at Arizona. They came back to defeat USC 27–17. A win by Washington State over Washington in the Apple Cup game put UCLA in sole possession of first place in the Pac-10. UCLA became the only four-loss team to play in the Rose Bowl. This was the ninth appearance for UCLA in the Rose Bowl.

== Game summary ==
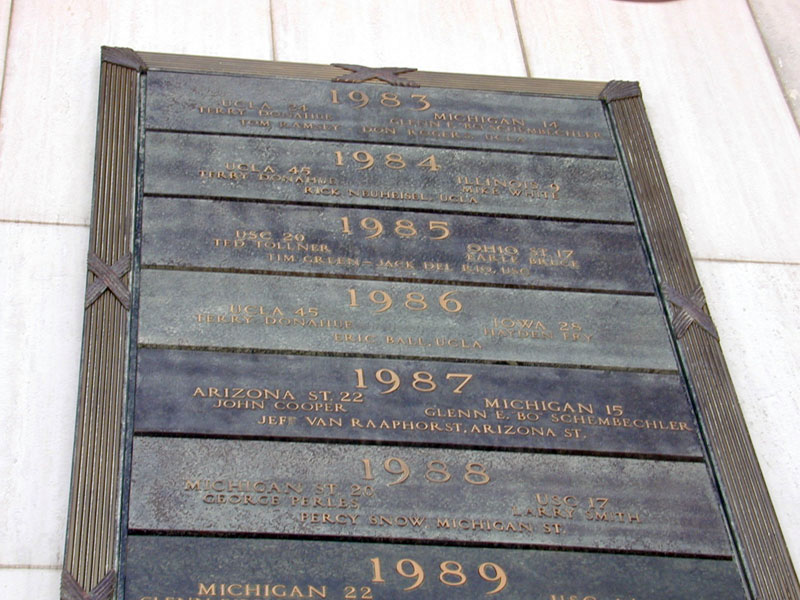
Rose Bowl records at the Hall of Champions

The weather was sunny and 84 degrees. As the "visiting team", UCLA wore their white road jerseys with gold pants, and the Illinois Fighting Illini wore their navy blue home jerseys with orange pants. This was the first time UCLA wore its white jerseys in a Rose Bowl; in three previous appearances as the designated visiting team (1962 vs. Minnesota, 1966 vs. Michigan St., and 1976 vs. Ohio St.), the Bruins wore their home "powder keg blue" jerseys since they sufficiently contrasted with the Big Ten representative's jerseys.

The game was the second Rose Bowl meeting between the two schools. They met in the 1947 Rose Bowl following the Big Ten–Pacific Coast Conference agreement in 1947. This was the eighth overall meeting between the two schools with Illinois having a 5–2 edge since the first meeting in 1947. The game was played on a Monday due to the Rose Bowl tradition of not holding the Tournament of Roses Parade and Rose Bowl on a Sunday.

Quarterback Neuheisel, and several other Bruins awoke with food poisoning that morning. Some UCLA players were unable to play, including starting defensive tackle David Randle, punter Kevin Buenafe and reserve defensive lineman Tory Pankopf. Bruin Coach Terry Donahue realized that Neuheisel was so sick that his presence on the team bus might psych out the rest of the team. Donahue put Neuheisel into a private car for the trip to the stadium.

The Bruins kicked off. Don Rogers, the 1983 Rose Bowl player of the game, intercepted a pass from Jack Trudeau on the third play of the game with only 43 seconds off the clock. At the end of the drive, John Lee attempted the field goal. It was blocked by Luke Sewall of the Illini, and was picked up by the Illini safety Craig Swoope. Swoope ran with the ball and fumbled, which was recovered by the Bruins. The first score by the Bruins came on the following drive. The first of four touchdown passes by Rick Neuheisel was to Paul Bergmann.

The Illini barely used their rushing game passing 79% of the time, and Trudeau threw 14 straight passes in the first half. They had the ball on the UCLA 28-yard line starting the second period. Trudeau threw two incomplete passes and a four-yard completion. Chris White kicked a 41-yard field goal to make the score 7–3 with 13:59 left in the half. Kevin Nelson completed the next score for the Bruins with a 28-yard run. Don Rogers got a second interception from Trudeau, which tied a Rose Bowl record. On the following drive Neuheisel finished off with a 16-yard touchdown pass to Karl Dorrell to take a 21–3 lead. On the Bruins next drive, Mike Young scored another touchdown from a Neuheisel pass.

In the second half, Neuheisel threw his record-setting fourth touchdown pass to Karl Dorrell to put the Bruins up 35–3. The Illini were still struggling to get the passing and ground game going and failed to convert on third down. Another Bruin field goal by John Lee put the Bruins up 38-3. After the field goal, the scoreboard read: Caltech 38, Illinois 3, which was then changed to Caltech 38 M.I.T 3. The Rose Bowl was able to cut the power to the scoreboard before it was able to read Caltech 2 Rose Bowl 0. The Rose Bowl officials could not get the scoreboard straightened out, so time and score were kept on the field spoken over the public address system. At this point, Illini coach Mike White was battling the clock. The Bruins allowed the Illini short passes and Thomas Rooks of the Illini would score. UCLA finished off with one more running touchdown to make the final score 45–9.

=== Scoring ===
==== First quarter ====
- UCLA – Paul Bergmann, three-yard pass from Rick Neuheisel. John Lee converts.

==== Second quarter ====
- Illinois – Chris White, 41-yard field goal.
- UCLA – Kevin Nelson 28-yard run. Lee converts.
- UCLA – Karl Dorrell reception touchdown on 16-yard pass from Neuheisel. Lee converts.
- UCLA – Mike Young reception touchdown on 53-yard pass from Neuheisel. Lee converts.

==== Third quarter ====
- UCLA – Dorrell, 15-yard pass from Neuheisel. Lee converts.
- UCLA – Lee, 29-yard field goal.

==== Fourth quarter ====
- Illinois – Thomas Rooks, five-yard pass from Jack Trudeau. Pass failed.
- UCLA – Bryan Wiley, eight-yard run. Lee converts.

=== Statistics ===
| Statistics | UCLA | Illinois |
|---|---|---|
| First downs | 27 | 16 |
| Total offense - Yards | 511 | 205 |
| Rushes-yards (net) | 213 | 0 |
| Passing yards (net) | 298 | 205 |
| Passes, Comp-Att-Int | 22–31–0 | 25–47–4 |
| Penalties–Yards | 5–44 | 6–65 |

== Aftermath ==
Illinois finished with 0 rushing yards on 17 carries. Jack Trudeau completed 23 passes on 39 attempts for 178 yards with three interceptions. Trudeau's three interceptions tied a Rose Bowl single-game record (set in the 1963 Rose Bowl) which still stands as of 2008. Rick Neuheisel completed 22 of 31 passes for 298 yards with four touchdowns and no interceptions. Terry Donahue was later to state that the man-to-man pass coverage by the Illini was one of the reasons that they were able to be successful. Karl Dorrell in particular was able to beat Illinois freshman cornerback Keith Taylor. Rick Neuheisel's four touchdown passes tied the Rose Bowl record, set by Pete Beathard in 1963, and later tied by Chad Henne in the 2005 Rose Bowl. Don Rogers' two interceptions tied eight other individuals, and has been tied again by four more. Jack Trudeau would later go on to set an NCAA record of 215 pass attempts without an interception in the 1985 football season.

The loss by Illinois, plus a loss by the #2 ranked Texas Longhorns to the #4 ranked Georgia Bulldogs in the Cotton Bowl Classic 10-9, and a sloppy win for the #3 ranked Auburn Tigers over the #8 ranked Michigan Wolverines in the Sugar Bowl 9-7, paved the way for the #5 Miami Hurricanes, who defeated the #1 Nebraska Cornhuskers in the Orange Bowl, to win their first national championship.

The international broadcast of the Rose Bowl also helped introduce the world to the audience wave, as UCLA and Illinois fans kept the wave going around the Rose Bowl stadium.

Eventual Minnesota head coach Tim Brewster was the captain of the Fighting Illini. Rick Neuheisel would eventually become coach of the Washington Huskies and coach them to victory in the 2001 Rose Bowl, the first time a Rose Bowl MVP coached a Rose Bowl winning team. Neuheisel eventually became the coach of the UCLA Bruins, replacing Rose Bowl teammate Karl Dorrell.

It was the first time that an unranked team defeated a top five team in a bowl game. The only other time this has happened was in when Purdue won on an 80-yard drive led by Drew Brees with 1:25 left in the 1998 Alamo Bowl versus #4 ranked Kansas State. Drew Brees and Purdue would later meet the Washington Huskies coached by Rick Neuheisel in the 2001 Rose Bowl.

On June 27, 1986, Don Rogers died of a cocaine overdose at his mother's home, only eight days after Maryland basketball player Len Bias died also of a cocaine overdose.

== Scoreboard prank ==
A prank played by students from the California Institute of Technology altered the scoreboard display, an incident reminiscent of the Great Rose Bowl Hoax of 1961. A pair of Caltech students evaded security at the Rose Bowl, gained access to the electronic system and installed a computer that could be remotely controlled to alter the display on the stadium's digital scoreboard. During the game, the students from Caltech remotely altered the scoreboard display to show the teams playing in the game as Caltech and M.I.T., in place of UCLA and Illinois. One of the prank's perpetrators had received approval from his Caltech professor for the prank, which earned him credit for the course "Experimental Projects in Electrical Circuits".

== Bibliography ==
- Jim Barnhart - 1984: Illini no match for Neuheisel, UCLA, Bloomington-Normal, Illinois Pantagraph (Pantagraph.com), December 15, 2007
- Bob Timmermann - The Rose Bowl and me: Part two: January 2, 1984 - UCLA vs. Illinois. Baseball Toaster (Griddle), December 27, 2006
- MATT HURST - Illinois' 1984 Rose Bowl loss is one the team would like to forget. The (Riverside) Press-Enterprise, December 26, 2007
- TRACY DODDS - Ailing Quarterback Leads UCLA to 45–9 Win in Rose Bowl. Los Angeles Times, January 3, 1984
- Los Angeles Times Staff - Caltech at It Again. Credit Beavers for Sabotaging Rose Bowl Scoreboard. Los Angeles Times, January 3, 1984. Quote:"In the fourth quarter, UCLA was leading Illinois, 38–9, but the scoreboard read: Caltech 38, MIT 9."
- Los Angeles Times Staff - Favorites Bowled Over. Neuheisel Leads Bruins to Glory; Nebraska Loses. Los Angeles Times, January 3, 1984. Quote:"In a day of bowl game upsets, UCLA swamped Illinois, 45–9, No. 2-ranked Texas was defeated, 10–9, by Georgia and previously unbeaten Nebraska, rated No. 1 in all polls, was surprised by Miami, 31–30."
- CHRIS BAKER - Neuheisel Proves to Be Poison to Illinois. Four Scoring Passes Are a Tough Act for Illini to Stomach. Los Angeles Times, January 3, 1984. Quote:"UCLA quarterback Rick Neuheisel had trouble sleeping before Monday's Rose Bowl game, but it wasn't because he was having nightmares about facing Illinois' defense."
- UCLA Bruins Football Media Guide (PDF copy available at www.uclabruins.com)
