= 1983 Aloha Bowl =

American college football game

- Bowl Game
Penn State Nittany Lions	Washington Huskies
(7–4–1)	(8–3)
Independent	Pac-10
13	10
Head coach: Joe Paterno	Head coach: Don James
	1	2	3	4	Total
Penn State	3	0	0	10	13
Washington	7	3	0	0	10
- Date: December 26, 1983
- Season: 1983
- Stadium: Aloha Stadium
- Location: Honolulu, Hawaii
- Favorite: Penn State by 1 point
- Referee: Jack Gatto (PCAA)
- Attendance: 37,212

United States TV coverage
- Network: Metrosports
- Announcers: Ray Scott (play-by-play); Joe Butitta (color commentator)

The 1983 Aloha Bowl was an American college football bowl game played on December 26 at Aloha Stadium in Honolulu, Hawaii. The game pitted the Washington Huskies of the Pacific-10 Conference and the independent Penn State Nittany Lions.

== Teams ==
=== Penn State ===
The defending national champion Nittany Lions began the season ranked #4 in the nation, but suffered through three straight losses, with two to ranked opponents (#1 Nebraska and #13 Iowa), which dropped them out of the polls. Penn State rebounded with five straight victories, beating #3 Alabama and #4 West Virginia before a match-up with #19 Boston College. The 27–17 loss to the Eagles was their last of the season, as they beat Brown and Notre Dame (while tying Pittsburgh) to finish with a 7–4–1 record. This was their 13th straight appearance in a bowl game and they were favored by one point.

=== Washington ===
Under head coach Don James, Washington began the season ranked #19 in the polls. They responded with victories over Northwestern and #8 Michigan to rise to ninth. A loss to LSU dropped them to #18, but the Huskies responded with four straight wins to get back to #11. A loss to UCLA hurt their chances at a Pac-10 title, though they won their next two games to get back to #15 and in the hunt for a shared title before a matchup with Washington State in the Apple Cup at Husky Stadium. The underdog Cougars won again to ruin Washington's chance at a conference title, as the Huskies finished second to UCLA. This was their fifth straight bowl game and sixth in seven seasons.

== Game summary ==
Nick Gancitano kicked a 23-yard field goal to make it 3-0 Penn State to culminate their first possession. Later in the second quarter, Danny Greene returned a punt 57 yards for a touchdown to make it 7-3 Huskies with 8:51 to go in the half. With 36 seconds to go in the quarter, Jeff Jaeger culminated a 65 yard drive with his 39 yard field goal to make it 10–3 Washington at halftime.

After a scoreless third quarter, Cancitano make it 10–6 on his 49 yard field goal, his longest of his career. Washington simply could not advance the ball the rest of the way, which gave Penn State the opportunity to try to win the game. They started their drive on the 49 with 6:54 to go. On nine plays, Penn State drove down the field for the score, with D. J. Dozier scoring the winning touchdown from 2 yards out to give the Nittany Lions the winning points. Washington had 18 first downs, 126 rushing yards on 33 carries and 153 passing yards (with 19-of-40 passing). Penn State had 15 first downs, 95 rushing yards on 40 carries, and 118 passing yards (with 14-of-34 passing and one interception).

== Aftermath ==
The Nittany Lions reached four more bowl games in the decade, winning a championship in 1987. The Huskies reached five more bowl games in the decade. Penn State never reached the Aloha Bowl again, while Washington returned once more in 1997.
