= 1983 Arizona Wildcats football team =

American college football season

1983 Arizona Wildcats football
- Conference: Pacific-10 Conference
- Record: 7–3–1 (4–3–1 Pac-10)
- Head coach: Larry Smith (4th season)
- Offensive coordinator: Steve Axman (4th season)
- Defensive coordinator: Moe Ankney (4th season)
- Home stadium: Arizona Stadium

1983 Pacific-10 Conference football standings
	Conf.					Overall
Team	W		L		T	W		L		T
No. 17 UCLA $	6	–	1	–	1	7	–	4	–	1
Washington	5	–	2	–	0	8	–	4	–	0
Washington State	5	–	3	–	0	7	–	4	–	0
USC	4	–	3	–	0	4	–	6	–	1
Arizona	4	–	3	–	1	7	–	3	–	1
Arizona State	3	–	3	–	1	6	–	4	–	1
Oregon	3	–	3	–	1	4	–	6	–	1
California	3	–	4	–	1	5	–	5	–	1
Oregon State	1	–	6	–	1	3	–	7	–	1
Stanford	1	–	7	–	0	1	–	10	–	0
$ – Conference champion; Rankings from AP Poll

The 1983 Arizona Wildcats football team represented the University of Arizona in the Pacific-10 Conference (Pac-10) during the 1983 NCAA Division I-A football season. In their fourth season under head coach Larry Smith, the Wildcats compiled a 7–3–1 record (4–3–1 against Pac-10 opponents), finished in fifth place in the Pac-10, and outscored their opponents, 343 to 188. The offense scored an average of 31.2 points per game, the eighth best average in Division I-A. The team played its home games in Arizona Stadium in Tucson, Arizona. They were ineligible for a bowl game (including the Rose Bowl) due to NCAA violations (see below).

The team's statistical leaders included Tom Tunnicliffe with 2,474 passing yards, Chris Brewer with 586 rushing yards, and Jay Dobyns with 694 receiving yards. Linebacker Ricky Hunley led the team with 176 total tackles.

== Before the season ==
The Wildcats finished the 1982 season with a 6–4–1 (4–3–1 Pac-10) record and entered 1983 with high expectations with a chance to contend for a possible trip to the Rose Bowl.

=== NCAA investigation ===
In the spring of 1983, Arizona was placed on probation by both the Pac-10 and the NCAA after it was discovered that the football program was involved in a slush fund scandal by giving players cash payments, which is illegal under NCAA rules. Tony Mason, Smith's predecessor, was allegedly involved in the scandal. After a three-year investigation, the NCAA and the Pac-10 found enough evidence that Mason covered up the scandal and that the Arizona football program broke NCAA rules by committing academic fraud as well as recruiting violations. The program was handed out infractions by the NCAA, including being placed on probation (the team was originally placed on probation in 1981 and Mason had already resigned before the 1980 season began, leading to the hiring of Smith to clean up the mess left behind by Mason).

Due to the scandal, the NCAA handed out the following sanctions to the Wildcats, which included:

- A probation of three years
- A $250,000 fine
- A loss of several scholarships and a ban of on-campus recruits during the season
- A two-year ban from playing in bowl games
- A two-year ban from having games broadcast live on television
- A two-year ban from being ranked in polls

The NCAA/Pac-10 did not forfeit all of Arizona's wins from Mason's tenure due to the fact that the infractions occurred off the field.

Due to television broadcasting rights for Arizona's games already booked for the 1983 season prior to the ban being handed down, the TV ban was in effect for the 1984–85 seasons.

The Wildcats were also barred from eligibility to ranked in the polls (primarily in the AP and coaches’ polls) due to the sanctions. However, it was only affected for the 1984 and 1985 seasons, as the AP predicted the Wildcats to be competitive in 1983 despite being on probation.

In addition, the Pac-10 announced that the Wildcats were ineligible for the 1983 and 1984 conference championships and the Rose Bowls if they were to finish in first place in both seasons (to date, the Wildcats have yet to make an appearance in the bowl game).

== Schedule ==
Date	Time	Opponent	Rank	Site	TV	Result	Attendance	Source
September 3	7:00 p.m.	Oregon State	No. 14	Arizona Stadium; Tucson, AZ	USA	W 50–6	40,507	
September 10	7:00 p.m.	Utah*	No. 11	Arizona Stadium; Tucson, AZ	WTBS	W 38–0	44,904	
September 17	12:30 p.m.	at Washington State	No. 7	Martin Stadium; Pullman, WA	ABC	W 45–6	25,000	
September 24	7:00 p.m.	Cal State Fullerton*	No. 4	Arizona Stadium; Tucson, AZ	KZAZ	W 27–10	43,107	
October 1	12:30 p.m.	at California	No. 3	California Memorial Stadium; Berkeley, CA	ABC	T 33–33	40,018	
October 8	7:00 p.m.	Colorado State*	No. 10	Arizona Stadium; Tucson, AZ	KZAZ	W 52–21	40,309	
October 15	1:00 p.m.	Oregon	No. 9	Arizona Stadium; Tucson, AZ	CBS	L 10–19	45,233	
October 22	1:00 p.m.	at Stanford	No. 19	Stanford Stadium; Stanford, CA	ABC	L 22–31	40,208	
November 5	1:30 p.m.	No. 20 Washington^{†}		Arizona Stadium; Tucson, AZ	CBS	L 22–23	48,808	
November 12	1:30 p.m.	UCLA		Arizona Stadium; Tucson, AZ	CBS	W 27–24	42,640	
November 26	1:30 p.m.	at Arizona State		Sun Devil Stadium; Tempe, AZ (rivalry)	CBS	W 17–15	70,033	
*Non-conference game; ^{†}Homecoming; Rankings from AP Poll released prior to the game; All times are in Mountain time

== Game summaries ==
=== Oregon State ===
Arizona opened the season against Oregon State for the second consecutive season. The Wildcats, who were ranked 14th in the preseason polls, didn't miss a beat and scored 50 points in their dominance over the Beavers.

=== California ===
On the road at California, the Wildcats, unbeaten and ranked third, came out hot and led 26–3 at one point before the Golden Bears stormed back by outscoring Arizona 30–7 to tie it midway through the fourth quarter. Neither team would score the rest of the way, and settled for the tie, which ended the Wildcats’ chances of a possible perfect season, but still had their unbeaten hopes intact.

=== Colorado State ===
After their devastating tie at California, the Wildcats returned home to host Colorado State in a rare October non-conference game. The Rams had no answer against Arizona's offense, who lit up the score with 52 points on its way to a victory. The win avenged the Wildcats’ loss to the Rams in 1980 in coach Smith's Arizona debut. The 52 points were the most Arizona scored in a game during the season.

=== Oregon ===
Arizona came in to the game against Oregon unbeaten (including a tie) and ranked ninth. Despite keeping Oregon in check on defense, the Wildcats sputtering on offense, perhaps due to a blitzing defense by the Ducks. In the end, Oregon came out on top and handed Arizona their first defeat of the season.

=== Stanford ===
The Wildcats traveled on the road to Stanford to visit the rebuilding and winless Cardinal. Stanford was hungry for a win and ultimately took down Arizona in front of their home fans. The loss turned out to be Stanford's only win of the season.

=== Washington ===
On homecoming weekend, Arizona hosted 20th-ranked Washington. The Wildcats were looking for their first win against the Huskies, and seemed to be on their way to that until Washington connected on a field goal as time expired in the fourth quarter to win and give Arizona their third straight loss. It was the first and only game of the season that Arizona faced a ranked opponent.

=== UCLA ===
Arizona hosted UCLA in their home finale. The Bruins were unbeaten in the Pac-10 and were contending for the Rose Bowl. In a back and forth battle, the Wildcats rallied in the fourth quarter and took the lead with a touchdown with over a minute remaining. UCLA tried to respond, but missed a field goal that would’ve forced a tie in the final seconds, and Arizona escaped with the win and snapped their three-game losing streak. Kicker Max Zendejas made a pair of field goals that went over 50 yards for the Wildcats. It was the only conference loss for UCLA, as they went on to capture the Rose Bowl.

=== Arizona State ===
In the annual rivalry game against Arizona State, the Wildcats referred to game as their bowl game, as they were ineligible for the postseason due to the NCAA sanctions. In the game itself, they fell behind late in the fourth quarter after ASU scored a touchdown to take a 15–14 lead (they missed a two-point conversion attempt) and Arizona had one final chance. They would drive into ASU territory and into field goal range. Zendejas connected on a 45-yard field goal as time expired to win the game for the Wildcats. It was the first time since 1961–62 that the Wildcats defeated the Sun Devils in back-to-back seasons. Also, it was Arizona's smallest margin of victory over ASU since 1955 (where they won by one point that season).

== Awards and honors ==
- Ricky Hunley, LB, Pac-10 co-defensive player of the year, Consensus All-American

== Season notes ==
- Arizona improved on their previous seasons’ win totals under coach Smith (five in 1980, six in both 1981 and 1982, and seven in 1983). The seven wins were the most by the Wildcats since 1975, when they won nine games.
- Two of the Wildcats’ non-conference opponents (Utah and Colorado State) were from the WAC, Arizona's old conference. The Wildcats ultimately defeated both teams.
- The Wildcats’ collapse against California (which led to a tie) marked a low point in the Smith era. Entering the game, Arizona was ranked third, which still remains the team's highest ranking in school history.
- The win over Arizona State drew comparisons to the 1979 meeting, with the Wildcats winning on a field goal on the last play of the game and that it was also played in Tempe.
- It was the second straight season that was memorable for game-winning field goals by Zendejas, as he beat Notre Dame with a kick in the previous season.
- Arizona was ineligible for a bowl game due to NCAA sanctions (see above), despite seven victories. Also, the television ban (as part of the NCAA sanctions) began the following season due to the games for this season being picked up for TV before the sanctions were announced.
- The penalties that Arizona received due to the recruiting scandal heavily affected the Wildcats’ chances at signing local players that began this season and may have hurt their chances at the Rose Bowl later in Smith's era.
- Arizona linebacker Ricky Hunley won a share of the Pac-10 defensive player of the year and becoming the first Wildcat to win a conference award since Arizona joined the Pac-10 in 1978. Several future Wildcats would win Pac-10/12 defensive player of the year awards since then.
- If not for the NCAA sanctions, Smith would have likely won the Pac-10 coach of the year award.
- For the second straight season, all of Arizona's road games were played on the road.

== Personnel ==
1983 Arizona Wildcats football team roster
Players
Coaches
Offense

Pos.	#	Name	Class
WR		Brad Anderson
WR		Ruben Barry
RB		Chris Brewer
QB		John Conner
OL		David Connor
QB		Andy Crouch
OL		Brian Denton
OL		Charlie Dickey
WR		Jay Dobyns
RB		Neon Edwards
OL		Nils Fox
RB		Phil Freeman
OL		Marsharne Graves
RB		Courtney Griffin
WR		Jon Horton
WR		Troy Hunter
QB		Alfred Jenkins
RB		Vance Johnson
OL		Bryon Nelson
RB		William Redman
QB		Tom Tunnicliffe	Sr
TE		Mark Walczak
RB		Glenn Wellman

Defense

Pos.	#	Name	Class
DL		John Barthalt
DB		Don Be'Ans
LB		Steve Boadway
DB		Lynnden Brown
DB		Gordon Bunch
DL		Joe Drake
DB		Allan Durden
DB		Bryan Evans
LB		Lamonte Hunley
LB		Ricky Hunley
LB		John Kaiser
DL		Ivan Lesnik
DB		Randy Robins
LB		Cliff Thorpe
DB		Greg Turner
LB		Craig Vesling
DL		David Wood

Special teams

Pos.	#	Name	Class
P		Craig Schiller
K		Max Zendejas	So

Head coach

- Larry Smith

Coordinators/assistant coaches

- Tom Roggeman
- Terry Malone GA

Legend

- (C) Team captain
- (S) Suspended
- (I) Ineligible
- Injured
- Redshirt
