= 1983 Oregon State vs. Oregon football game =

Worst College Football Game of all time

"The Toilet Bowl"
- Conference game
Oregon State Beavers	Oregon Ducks
(2–8)	(4–6)
0	0
Head coach: Joe Avezzano	Head coach: Rich Brooks
	1	2	3	4	Total
Oregon State	0	0	0	0	0
Oregon	0	0	0	0	0
- Date: November 19, 1983
- Season: 1983
- Stadium: Autzen Stadium
- Location: Eugene, Oregon
- Favorite: Oregon by 13 1/2
- Attendance: 33,176

The 1983 Oregon State vs. Oregon football game was a college football game played on November 19, 1983, at Autzen Stadium in Eugene, Oregon, the 87th playing of the annual Oregon–Oregon State football rivalry game, then known as the Civil War. The game ended in a scoreless tie, and since overtime was added to NCAA Division I games in 1996, this is likely to be the last such game.

Due to the very poor standard of play, including eleven turnovers and four missed field goals, as well as the miserable weather conditions in which it was played, the game is often referred to as the Toilet Bowl.

== Teams ==
=== Oregon State Beavers ===
In his four years as head coach, Joe Avezzano's Beavers had won a total of 4 games, including two one-win seasons and one winless season. The 1983 squad had been predicted to win five games and mark a turnaround in the program, but with only two wins so far that season, Avezzano's job was in jeopardy. Additionally, the Beavers had lost eight straight to Oregon. The Beavers were led by fullback Bryce Oglesby, who was second in the conference in rushing yards. At quarterback, however, they were down to third-string replacement Ladd McKittrick, after injuries to season-starter Ricky Greene and backup Jeff Seay.

=== Oregon Ducks ===
Rich Brooks was in his seventh season as Ducks head coach. Brooks, who had played at Oregon State and been an assistant coach there, had never lost a game as a player or coach for either team in the rivalry; despite some down seasons with the Ducks, his seven straight rivalry victories had made him a popular coach. The Ducks were experiencing a mediocre season, but nonetheless came into the game as 13 1/2 point favorites over the hapless Beavers. Like the Beavers, the Ducks were down to their third-string quarterback: Chris Miller, an untested freshman. Mike Jorgensen, who had started the season at quarterback, was out with a broken leg and backup Mike Owens had been ineffective in relief.

== Game summary ==
Until it was surpassed by the winter of 1995–96 (which led to the Willamette Valley Flood of 1996), 1983 was the wettest ever recorded in Eugene. On November 19, a storm swept through Oregon with extremely windy conditions that led to the shipwreck of the Blue Magpie, causing a major spill in Yaquina Bay on the Oregon Coast. At Autzen Stadium, the game took place in a cold, driving rainstorm. During the game, water cascaded down stadium aisles onto the field, leaving coaches, players, and other field personnel on the sidelines standing in several inches of water. In the press box, the windows fogged up; in order to see the field, coaches had to open the windows, allowing sideways rain to enter. As the game progressed, players had to contend with huge standing puddles that developed on Autzen Stadium's AstroTurf field.

=== First half ===
As the game began, the Beavers, though heavy underdogs, seemed determined to end their eight-year losing streak and dominated the first half both defensively and offensively. The Beavers held the Ducks to 45 yards and a single pass completion. Oregon did not breach Oregon State's 49 yard-line in the first half. The Beavers opened the game with a 55-yard drive to the Duck 20, but a fumble by tailback Bryce Oglesby was recovered by Duck defensive tackle Dan Ralph.

Halfway through the second quarter, Oregon State drove to the Oregon 9 yard line, but kicker Marty Breen missed a 26-yard field goal. A few plays later, the Beavers tackled Oregon punter Kevin Hicks back at the 7 yard line and took possession deep in Duck territory. On the next play, however, a fumble by Beaver fullback James Terrell was recovered by the Ducks' Ron Johnson. Just before halftime, Oregon's freshman quarterback Miller, who had completed just 1 of 7 passes in the half in his first college start, fumbled on the Duck 31 yard line and the Beavers recovered with four seconds left in the half. The Beavers attempted a field goal from the spot, but kicker Breen missed his second field goal attempt, this time from 48 yards.

=== Second half ===
In the second half, it was the Ducks' turn to control the ball. Running back Kevin McCall got most of the work on his way to 100 yards on the day. But the Ducks too were unable to convert yards into points; on their second possession, they drove to the Beaver 3 yard line before being stopped, and Ducks kicker Paul Schwabe missed a 20-yard field goal attempt. Early in the fourth quarter, Oregon fullback Todd Bland fumbled the ball away at the Oregon State 5 yard line. With 3:40 left in the still-scoreless game, Schwabe missed another field goal—the fourth missed field goal of the game, two for each side—this time from 50 yards out.

In the game's final three minutes, the game's miscues achieved a comic ineptitude: the Ducks intercepted two Beaver passes, while the Beavers recovered a Duck fumble and intercepted another Duck pass. In all, the game featured five interceptions and 11 fumbles, six of which were recovered by the opposing team.

With 14 seconds remaining, the Beavers punted from their own 37 yard line, and instead of attempting a return and conserving clock, Ducks kick returner Lew Barnes let the ball roll dead at the Oregon 18 with one second left. Mike Owens, who had replaced Miller at quarterback, completed a pass to Barnes, who then lateraled to Laderia Johnson. Johnson raced into Beaver territory before being run out of bounds by Beaver linebacker James Murphy at the 18-yard line; officials ruled he had stepped out at the 50 anyway, ending the game at that point.

=== Statistics ===
Statistics	Oregon State	Oregon
First downs	11	17
Rushes–yards (net)	55–138	47–180
Passing yards (net)	100	165
Total yards	238	345
Return yards	22	18
Passes comp–att–int	7–15–2	11–25–3
Punts–avg	9–40.9	7–36.9
Fumbles–lost	4–2	7–4
Penalties–yards	10–68	3–40
Field goals attempted–made	2–0	2–0
Time of possession	30:41	29:19

== Aftermath ==
The game represented a low point for both teams. It was the fifth scoreless tie in the rivalry's history (the first since 1931), and the first in NCAA Division I FBS college football since a 1979 game between Eastern Michigan and Northern Illinois. It would also turn out to be the last college football game to end in a scoreless tie: in 1996, the NCAA implemented overtime, ensuring that no future game unless it was called for weather, would end in a tie. However, for record keeping purposes, a scoreless tie is declared once regulation ends as a scoreless tie.

The game was initially derided as "The Doughnut Bowl", a play on college football's numerous bowl games, by the Bottom 10 column at the time, but now is more commonly referred to as the Toilet Bowl.

Following the game, Oregon State's board of intercollegiate athletics voted to fire Avezzano; however, with urging from athletic director Dee Andros, school president Robert MacVicar chose to give him another chance. The 1984 season was no more successful, as the Beavers managed just two wins, and Avezzano was fired at its conclusion.

The Beavers' winless streak against the Ducks reached 13 before it was finally broken with a 21–10 victory in 1988.

This game may have marked the nadir of Brooks' tenure at Oregon: the team gradually improved in the next few years, making its first bowl game appearance since 1963 in the 1989 Independence Bowl, winning the Pac-10 conference in 1994, and advancing to the Rose Bowl, where they lost to Big Ten Conference champion Penn State.

Following the Rose Bowl, Brooks was hired as head coach of the NFL's St. Louis Rams. The Ducks' freshman quarterback Chris Miller, despite a rocky first start, went on to a successful ten-year career in the NFL, mostly with the Atlanta Falcons. Jorgensen, the first-string quarterback whose broken leg prevented him from playing in the game, became the football color analyst for Ducks radio broadcasts in 1990.

Since the introduction of overtime, there have been at least two FBS scoreless ties in regulation. On October 22, 2005, Arkansas State defeated Florida Atlantic 3–0 in overtime (subsequently vacated, it was a no contest). The most recent scoreless tie came on November 22, 2014, when Wake Forest defeated Virginia Tech 6–3. Each team scored a field goal in the first overtime, and Wake Forest won by scoring a field goal when Virginia Tech could not score in the second overtime. Under current overtime rules, a scoreless tie could result in a 2-0 final score, either with a safety in overtime or if both teams fail to score in the first two overtime periods, then teams alternate two-point conversion attempts starting in the third overtime period. If one team fails their attempt and the other succeeds, the game ends.
