= Bob Smith (American football coach) =

American football coach

Biographical details
- Born: April 22, 1940 (age 86)
- Education: Peoria High School

Coaching career (HC unless noted)
- 1973–1977: Manual HS (IL)
- 1978–1983: Illinois (assistant)
- 1984–1987: Southeast Missouri State
- 1988: Illinois (assistant)
- 1989–1993: Southern Illinois

Head coaching record
- Overall: 102-72-1 (football)

Accomplishments and honors

Championships
- 1 MIAA (1987)

Awards
- MIAA Coach of the Year (1987)

Bob Smith (born April 22, 1940) is an American former football coach. He served as the head football coach at Southeast Missouri State University from 1984 to 1987 and Southern Illinois University Carbondale from 1989 to 1993, compiling a career college football coaching record of 102-72-1.

Smith was the head football coach at Manual High School in Peoria, Illinois from 1973 to 1977. In 1978, he joined the coaching staff at the University of Illinois at Urbana–Champaign and was put in charge of the receivers under head coach Gary Moeller. He remained on the Illinois staff when Mike White took over the program in 1980. By 1983, Smith was coaching the offensive linemen and helped guide the 1983 Illinois Fighting Illini football team to a Big Ten Conference title and an appearance in the 1984 Rose Bowl.

Smith led the Southeast Missouri State Redhawks to a record of 17–26–1 in four seasons. His 1987 squad shared the Missouri Intercollegiate Athletic Association (MIAA) title and Smith was named the conference's coach of the year. In early 1988, he resigned to return to Illinois and join the staff of John Mackovic, who had been hired to succeed White as head coach.

== Head coaching record ==
Year	Team	Overall	Conference	Standing	Bowl/playoffs
Southeast Missouri State Indians (Missouri Intercollegiate Athletic Association) (1984–1987)
1984	Southeast Missouri State	1–10	1–4	5th	
1985	Southeast Missouri State	4–7	2–3	T–3rd	
1986	Southeast Missouri State	6–5	4–1	2nd	
1987	Southeast Missouri State	6–4–1	4–0–1	T–1st	
Southeast Missouri State:		17–26–1	11–8–1		
Southern Illinois Salukis (Gateway Football Conference) (1989–1993)
1989	Southern Illinois	2–9	1–5	T–6th	
1990	Southern Illinois	2–9	1–5	T–6th	
1991	Southern Illinois	7–4	4–2	T–2nd	
1992	Southern Illinois	4–7	2–4	T–4th	
1993	Southern Illinois	2–9	1–5	7th	
Southern Illinois:		17–38	9–21		
Total:		34–64–1			
National championship Conference title Conference division title or championship game berth
