= 1983 Oregon Ducks football team =

American college football season

1983 Oregon Ducks football
- Conference: Pacific-10 Conference
- Record: 4–6–1 (3–3–1 Pac-10)
- Head coach: Rich Brooks (7th season)
- Offensive coordinator: Bob Toledo (1st season)
- Offensive scheme: I formation
- Defensive coordinator: Joe Schaffeld (1st season)
- Base defense: 4–3
- Captains: Steve Baack; La'Daria Johnson
- Home stadium: Autzen Stadium

1983 Pacific-10 Conference football standings
	Conf.					Overall
Team	W		L		T	W		L		T
No. 17 UCLA $	6	–	1	–	1	7	–	4	–	1
Washington	5	–	2	–	0	8	–	4	–	0
Washington State	5	–	3	–	0	7	–	4	–	0
USC	4	–	3	–	0	4	–	6	–	1
Arizona	4	–	3	–	1	7	–	3	–	1
Arizona State	3	–	3	–	1	6	–	4	–	1
Oregon	3	–	3	–	1	4	–	6	–	1
California	3	–	4	–	1	5	–	5	–	1
Oregon State	1	–	6	–	1	3	–	7	–	1
Stanford	1	–	7	–	0	1	–	10	–	0
$ – Conference champion; Rankings from AP Poll

The 1983 Oregon Ducks football team represented the University of Oregon in the 1983 NCAA Division I-A football season. Playing as a member of the Pacific-10 Conference (Pac-10), the team was led by head coach Rich Brooks, in his seventh year, and played their home games at Autzen Stadium in Eugene, Oregon. They finished the season with a record of 4–6–1 overall and 3–3–1 in the Pac-10).

The season-ending Civil War game with Oregon State was a scoreless tie; it later became known as "The Toilet Bowl".

== Schedule ==
Date	Time	Opponent	Site	TV	Result	Attendance	Source
September 3	1:00 pm	Pacific (CA)*	Autzen Stadium; Eugene, OR		L 15–21	26,273	
September 10	10:30 am	at No. 7 Ohio State*	Ohio Stadium; Columbus, OH	KEZI	L 6–31	88,524	
September 24	1:00 pm	Houston*	Autzen Stadium; Eugene, OR		W 15–14	26,105	
October 1	7:00 pm	at San Jose State*	Spartan Stadium; San Jose, CA		L 34–44	20,109	
October 8	1:00 pm	California	Autzen Stadium; Eugene, OR		W 24–17	27,102	
October 15	6:00 pm	at No. 9 Arizona	Arizona Stadium; Tucson, AZ		W 19–10	45,233	
October 22	1:00 pm	No. 14 Washington	Autzen Stadium; Eugene, OR (rivalry)	KEZI	L 3–32	44,303	
October 29	1:00 pm	at Washington State	Martin Stadium; Pullman, WA		L 7–24	29,500	
November 5	1:00 pm	UCLA	Autzen Stadium; Eugene, OR		L 13–24	24,511	
November 12	1:00 pm	at Stanford	Stanford Stadium; Stanford, CA (rivalry)		W 16–7	31,420	
November 19	1:00 pm	Oregon State	Autzen Stadium; Eugene, OR (Civil War)		T 0–0	33,176	
*Non-conference game; Rankings from AP Poll released prior to the game; All times are in Pacific time

== Personnel ==
1983 Oregon Ducks football team roster
Players
Coaches
Offense

Pos.	#	Name	Class
WR		Lew Barnes
WR		Harry Billups
RB		Todd Bland
TE		Dave Christensen
TE		Rich Gaiser
WR		Kwante Hampton
TE		Doug Herman
RB		Alan Jackson
RB		Ladaria Johnson
QB		Mike Jorgensen (injured)
RB		Eugene King
RB		Alex Mack
RB		Kevin McCall
QB	12	Chris Miller
QB		Mike Owens
OL		Greg Schwab
OL		Scott Shepard
OL		Brad Smith
OL		Ed Stringer
WR		Osborn Thomas
OL		Lino Vaccher
OL		Ken Warner
RB		Kevin Willhite
OL		Gary Zimmerman
OL		Ryan Zinke

Defense

Pos.	#	Name	Class
DL		Steve Baack
DB		Don Brown
DL		John Byrne
DB		Wendell Cason
LB		Dan Devaney
DL		Dale Dorning
LB		E.J. Duffy
LB		Bob Hudetz
DB		Ron Johnson
DB		Doug Judge
DL		Dave Maley
DB		Danny McCalister
LB		Jerry Mikels
DL		Dan Ralph
DB		Dan Wilken
DB		Jeff Williams
LB		Larry Wilson
DL		Terry Youngblood

Special teams

Pos.	#	Name	Class
P		Kevin Hicks
K		Todd Lee
K		Paul Schwabe

Head coach

- Rich Brooks

Coordinators/assistant coaches

- Bob Toledo (OC)

Legend

- (C) Team captain
- (S) Suspended
- (I) Ineligible
- Injured
- Redshirt
