= 1983 Stanford Cardinal football team =

American college football season

1983 Stanford Cardinal football
- Conference: Pacific-10 Conference
- Record: 1–10 (1–7 Pac-10)
- Head coach: Paul Wiggin (4th season)
- Offensive coordinator: Jim Fassel (3rd season)
- Offensive scheme: West Coast
- Defensive coordinator: A. J. Christoff (1st season)
- Base defense: 4–3
- Home stadium: Stanford Stadium

1983 Pacific-10 Conference football standings
	Conf.					Overall
Team	W		L		T	W		L		T
No. 17 UCLA $	6	–	1	–	1	7	–	4	–	1
Washington	5	–	2	–	0	8	–	4	–	0
Washington State	5	–	3	–	0	7	–	4	–	0
USC	4	–	3	–	0	4	–	6	–	1
Arizona	4	–	3	–	1	7	–	3	–	1
Arizona State	3	–	3	–	1	6	–	4	–	1
Oregon	3	–	3	–	1	4	–	6	–	1
California	3	–	4	–	1	5	–	5	–	1
Oregon State	1	–	6	–	1	3	–	7	–	1
Stanford	1	–	7	–	0	1	–	10	–	0
$ – Conference champion; Rankings from AP Poll

The 1983 Stanford Cardinal football team represented Stanford University in the Pacific-10 Conference (Pac-10) during the 1983 NCAA Division I-A football season and played home games on campus at Stanford Stadium in Stanford, California. Led by alumnus Paul Wiggin, in his fourth and final season as head coach, the Cardinal won only one game, the program's worst record since going winless in 1960. He was fired on November 11, but was allowed to finish out the season.

Stanford struggled on offense behind true freshman quarterback John Paye. Previous QB John Elway, a four-year starter, was the first selection of the 1983 NFL draft and started as a rookie for the Denver Broncos.

After the season in December, Jack Elway was hired from nearby San Jose State, where he went 35–20–1 (.634) in five seasons. His Spartans had defeated Stanford the previous three years, the first two while his son John was the Cardinal quarterback.

== Schedule ==
Date	Opponent	Site	Result	Attendance	Source
September 10	No. 2 Oklahoma*	Stanford Stadium; Stanford, CA	L 14–27	62,778	
September 17	at Illinois*	Memorial Stadium; Champaign, IL	L 7–17	72,852	
September 24	San Jose State*	Stanford Stadium; Stanford, CA (rivalry)	L 10–23	68,201	
October 1	at No. 20 Arizona State	Sun Devil Stadium; Tempe, AZ	L 11–29	53,795	
October 8	UCLA	Stanford Stadium; Stanford, CA (rivalry)	L 21–39	55,804	
October 15	at No. 17 Washington	Husky Stadium; Seattle, WA	L 15–32	59,270	
October 22	No. 19 Arizona	Stanford Stadium; Stanford, CA	W 31–22	40,208	
October 29	at Oregon State	Parker Stadium; Corvallis, OR	L 18–31	22,000	
November 5	at USC	Los Angeles Memorial Coliseum; Los Angeles, CA (rivalry)	L 7–30	50,867	
November 12	Oregon	Stanford Stadium; Stanford, CA (rivalry)	L 7–16	31,420	
November 19	California	Stanford Stadium; Stanford, CA (Big Game)	L 18–27	84,804	
*Non-conference game; Rankings from AP Poll released prior to the game

== Personnel ==
1983 Stanford Cardinal football team roster
Players			Coaches
Offense: Pos. / # / Name / Class; QB / / John Paye	Defense: Pos. / # / Name / Class	Special teams: Pos. / # / Name / Class	Head coach: Paul Wiggin; Coordinators/assistant coaches: Ray Handley – Associate head coach; Jim Fassel – Offensive Coordinator; Jim Anderson – Running back; Dave Ottmar – Wide receiver; Bryan Shaw – Tight end; A. J. Christoff – Defensive Coordinator; Larry Mac Duff – Defensive line; Mike Nolan – Inside linebacker; Legend: (C) Team captain; (S) Suspended; (I) Ineligible; Injured; Redshirt
