= Rick Mallory =

American football player and coach (born 1960)

No. 68
- Position: Guard

Personal information
- Born: October 21, 1960 (age 66); Renton, Washington, U.S.
- Listed height: 6 ft 2 in (1.88 m)
- Listed weight: 265 lb (120 kg)

Career information
- High school: Lindbergh (Renton)
- College: Washington
- NFL draft: 1984: 9th round, 225th overall pick

Career history

Playing
- Tampa Bay Buccaneers (1984–1988)

Coaching
- Washington (GA) (1992–1993); Washington (TE) (1994–1998); Memphis (OL) (2000–2009); UAB (OL) (2011); Middle Tennessee (T/TE) (2013–2015); Middle Tennessee (OL) (2016–2023); Siegel High School (Assistant) (2024-present)

Awards and highlights
- First-team All-Pac-10 (1983)

Career NFL statistics
- Games played: 57
- Games started: 37
- Stats at Pro Football Reference

Rick Mallory (born October 21, 1960) is an American former professional football guard and college football coach.

== Early life ==
From Renton, Washington, a suburb southeast of Seattle, Mallory played for the Washington Huskies from 1980 through 1983 under head coach Don James. He was a tight end his first two years, then moved to guard, where he was an All-Pac-10 performer and team captain.

== Professional career ==
Selected in the ninth round of the 1984 NFL draft, Mallory played five seasons with the Tampa Bay Buccaneers, from 1984 through 1988.

== Coaching career ==
Mallory made his coaching debut at his alma mater, the University of Washington, as a graduate assistant in 1992. He became the tight ends coach in 1994 under head coach Jim Lambright, and stayed through the 1998 season. Mallory moved on to coaching the offensive line at Memphis and UAB, then Middle Tennessee in 2013.
