= Platypus Trophy =

College football trophy

Platypus Trophy following restoration in 2007

The Platypus Trophy is a trophy awarded to the winner of the annual Oregon–Oregon State football rivalry game between the University of Oregon and Oregon State University. The trophy depicts a platypus, an animal which has features of both a duck (Oregon's mascot) and a beaver (Oregon State's mascot). For three years, from 1959 to 1961, the trophy was awarded to the winning school. The trophy was lost for more than 40 years before being rediscovered in 2005 and proposed as the game's unofficial trophy in 2007. It is currently awarded to the alumni association of the winning school.

== History ==
In 1959, University of Oregon director of public service Willard Thompson selected art student Warren Spady to create a trophy depicting a platypus to be presented to the winner of the upcoming rivalry game, then known as the Civil War. A platypus was chosen as the subject because with its duck-like bill and beaver-like tail, it resembles a combination of each school's mascot. Spady had only a month before the game to complete the trophy, which is carved from maple and measures 2 feet (0.61 m) wide and 18 inches (46 cm) tall. He submitted it unfinished, having not quite completed sculpting the feet.

Oregon was heavily favored in the 1959 game, but Oregon State won 15-7 and took home the trophy, which they displayed in a case at Gill Coliseum. During that year, Oregon students apparently stole the trophy, and kept it after the 1960 game ended in a 14-14 tie. In 1961, Oregon State won 6-2 and Oregon returned the trophy to Oregon State immediately following the game.

== Theft and disappearance ==
Following the 1961 game, the trophy was stolen several more times and was eventually forgotten as the football game's trophy. In 1986, artist Spady, now an art teacher in Eugene, spotted the trophy in a case at Oregon's Leighton Pool. It had apparently been reappropriated as a trophy for the schools' water polo rivalry, and was affixed with a brass plaque commemorating four consecutive Oregon water polo victories from 1964 to 1968. Spady was unable to convince anyone to reacquire the trophy for use in the football game, and in 2000, the pool and its trophy cases were demolished as part of a renovation project.

== Reappearance ==
In 2004, with the trophy long forgotten, Oregonian sportswriter John Canzano wrote a column lamenting the fact that unlike other college rivalry games, the Oregon–Oregon State rivalry had no trophy. Spady contacted Canzano and informed him of the existence of the Platypus Trophy, and a follow-up Canzano column ignited a search for the missing trophy. Led by Dan Williams, a UO administrator who had been the student body president who handed the trophy over to his OSU counterpart in 1961, the trophy was rediscovered in 2005 in a closet at the University of Oregon's McArthur Court.

After obtaining Spady's signature on the work, Williams returned the trophy to the Oregon Alumni Association so it could resume its role as a game trophy. However, despite initial interest from the schools' athletic directors to start awarding the trophy again, after viewing the abstract piece, they declined to do so. Instead, beginning with the 2007 game, the trophy was presented to the winning school's alumni association. Oregon State was the first recipient of the restored trophy after defeating Oregon 38-31 in overtime. It was presented prior to a basketball game in March 2008. When Oregon won the next year, the trophy was not exchanged (as of January 21, 2009). According to a 2012 KVAL story, the tradition soon languished yet again. According to the University of Oregon Alumni Association, however, it has continued to be awarded annually. In 2025, an ESPN story featured the history of the trophy, with both Oregon alumni director Raphe Beck and Oregon State alumni director John Valva confirming that the tradition still takes place.

News coverage has listed it among the "best traveling rivalry trophies."
