= Tom Thrower =

American football player and coach

Biographical details
- Born: c. 1937

Playing career
- 1957–1959: Southeast Missouri State
- Position: Halfback

Coaching career (HC unless noted)
- 1960–1963: Dexter HS (MO)
- 1964: Holtville HS (CA)
- 1965–1967: Southeast Missouri State (DB)
- 1968–1974: Southeast Missouri State

Head coaching record
- Overall: 37–22–2 (college)

Accomplishments and honors

Championships
- 3 MIAA (1968–1969, 1973)

Thomas W. Thrower (born c. 1937) is an American former football coach. He served as the head football coach at Southeast Missouri State University from 1968 to 1973, compiling a record of 37–22–2. Thrower played college football as a halfback at Southeast Missouri State from 1957 to 1959 under head coach Kenneth Knox. Following his graduation from Southeast Missouri State in 1960, he coached football at Dexter High School in Dexter, Missouri, from which he had graduated in 1955. After coaching four years at Dexter, he spent a year coaching football at Holtville High School in Holtville, California, before returning to Southeast Missouri State in 1965 to work as an assistant coach under Knox. Thrower coached the defensive backfield for three seasons before succeeding Knox as head coach in 1968. He resigned from his head coaching post at Southeast Missouri State in November 1973 following a conflict over regulations set by the Missouri Intercollegiate Athletic Association (MIAA) regarding spring practice and scholarships.

== Head coaching record ==
=== College ===
Year	Team	Overall	Conference	Standing	Bowl/playoffs
Southeast Missouri State Indians (Missouri Intercollegiate Athletic Association) (1968–1973)
1968	Southeast Missouri State	6–4	5–0	1st	
1969	Southeast Missouri State	8–2	4–1	T–1st	
1970	Southeast Missouri State	5–5	4–2	3rd	
1971	Southeast Missouri State	7–3–1	4–2	2nd	
1972	Southeast Missouri State	5–4–1	4–2	2nd	
1973	Southeast Missouri State	6–4	5–1	1st	
Southeast Missouri State:		37–22–2	26–8		
Total:		37–22–2			
National championship Conference title Conference division title or championship game berth
