= 1983 California Golden Bears football team =

American college football season

1983 California Golden Bears football
- Conference: Pacific-10 Conference
- Record: 5–5–1 (3–4–1 Pac-10)
- Head coach: Joe Kapp (2nd season)
- Home stadium: California Memorial Stadium

1983 Pacific-10 Conference football standings
	Conf.					Overall
Team	W		L		T	W		L		T
No. 17 UCLA $	6	–	1	–	1	7	–	4	–	1
Washington	5	–	2	–	0	8	–	4	–	0
Washington State	5	–	3	–	0	7	–	4	–	0
USC	4	–	3	–	0	4	–	6	–	1
Arizona	4	–	3	–	1	7	–	3	–	1
Arizona State	3	–	3	–	1	6	–	4	–	1
Oregon	3	–	3	–	1	4	–	6	–	1
California	3	–	4	–	1	5	–	5	–	1
Oregon State	1	–	6	–	1	3	–	7	–	1
Stanford	1	–	7	–	0	1	–	10	–	0
$ – Conference champion; Rankings from AP Poll

The 1983 California Golden Bears football team was an American football team that represented the University of California, Berkeley during the 1983 NCAA Division I-A football season. Under head coach Joe Kapp, the team compiled an overall record of 5–5–1 and 3–4–1 in conference.

== Schedule ==
Date	Opponent	Site	Result	Attendance	Source
September 3	at Texas A&M*	Kyle Field; College Station, TX	W 19–17	51,971	
September 10	at San Diego State*	Jack Murphy Stadium; San Diego, CA	L 14–28	19,853	
September 17	San Jose State*	California Memorial Stadium; Berkeley, CA	W 30–9	40,241	
October 1	No. 3 Arizona	California Memorial Stadium; Berkeley, CA	T 33–33	40,018	
October 8	at Oregon	Autzen Stadium; Eugene, OR	L 17–24	27,102	
October 15	Oregon State	California Memorial Stadium; Berkeley, CA	W 45–19	35,147	
October 22	at UCLA	Rose Bowl; Los Angeles, CA (rivalry)	L 16–20	58,062	
October 29	USC	California Memorial Stadium; Berkeley, CA	L 9–19	65,867	
November 5	Arizona State	California Memorial Stadium; Berkeley, CA	W 26–24	36,918	
November 12	at Washington State	Martin Stadium; Pullman, WA	L 6–16	15,000	
November 19	at Stanford	Stanford Stadium; Stanford, CA (Big Game)	W 27–18	84,804	
*Non-conference game; Rankings from AP Poll released prior to the game

== Season summary ==
=== vs No. 3 Arizona ===
The Wildcats, unbeaten and ranked third, came out hot and led 26–3 at one point before the Golden Bears stormed back by outscoring Arizona 30–7 to tie it midway through the fourth quarter. Neither team would score the rest of the way, and settled for the tie, which ended the Wildcats’ chances of a possible perfect season, but still had their unbeaten hopes intact.

=== vs Arizona State ===
Punter Tom Gandsey converted a first down on a fake punt, leading to Randy Pratt's game-winning 38-yard field goal.

=== at Stanford ===
	1	2	3	4	Total
Cal	7	7	7	6	27
Stanford	3	6	0	9	18

A: 84,804

CAL: Lewis 38 yard pass from Gilbert (Pratt kick)

STAN: Harmon 28 yard field goal

CAL: Garner 1 yard run (Pratt kick)

STAN: Harry 17 yard pass from Paye (run failed)

CAL: Bark 10 yard pass from Gilbert (Pratt kick)

CAL: Pratt 31 yard field goal

CAL: Pratt 43 yard field goal

STAN: Harmon 38 yard field goal

STAN: Mullins 53 yard pass from Paye (pass failed)

Leaders

Passing: CAL Gilbert 22-40-1-263; STAN Paye 19-46-4-303

Rushing: CAL Story 20-58; STAN Paye 12-33

Receiving: CAL McDougald 8-86; STAN Clymer 8-110

== Personnel ==
1983 California Golden Bears football team roster
Players
Coaches
Offense

Pos.	#	Name	Class
QB	11	J Torchio	Sr
QB	14	Gale Gilbert	Jr
WR	42	Andy Bark	Sr
RB	43	Dwight Garner	So
TE	86	David Lewis	Jr
WR	99	Rance McDougald	Jr

Defense

Pos.	#	Name	Class
DB	4	John Sullivan	Sr
DB		Richard Rodgers
LB	47	Hardy Nickerson	Fr
LB	80	Ron Rivera	Sr
DL		Byron Smith	Sr

Special teams

Pos.	#	Name	Class
P		Tom Gandsey
K		Randy Pratt

Head coach

- Joe Kapp

Coordinators/assistant coaches

Legend

- (C) Team captain
- (S) Suspended
- (I) Ineligible
- Injured
- Redshirt
