= 1983 Oregon State Beavers football team =

American college football season

1983 Oregon State Beavers football
- Conference: Pacific-10 Conference
- Record: 3–7–1 (1–6–1 Pac-10)
- Head coach: Joe Avezzano (4th season)
- Offensive coordinator: John Gough (1st season)
- Offensive scheme: Veer
- Defensive coordinator: Ray Braun (5th season)
- Base defense: 5–2
- Home stadium: Parker Stadium

1983 Pacific-10 Conference football standings
	Conf.					Overall
Team	W		L		T	W		L		T
No. 17 UCLA $	6	–	1	–	1	7	–	4	–	1
Washington	5	–	2	–	0	8	–	4	–	0
Washington State	5	–	3	–	0	7	–	4	–	0
USC	4	–	3	–	0	4	–	6	–	1
Arizona	4	–	3	–	1	7	–	3	–	1
Arizona State	3	–	3	–	1	6	–	4	–	1
Oregon	3	–	3	–	1	4	–	6	–	1
California	3	–	4	–	1	5	–	5	–	1
Oregon State	1	–	6	–	1	3	–	7	–	1
Stanford	1	–	7	–	0	1	–	10	–	0
$ – Conference champion; Rankings from AP Poll

The 1983 Oregon State Beavers football team represented Oregon State University as a remember of Pacific-10 Conference (Pac-10) during the 1983 NCAA Division I-A football season. In their fourth season under head coach Joe Avezzano, compiled an overall record of 3–7–1 record with a mark of 1–6–1 in conference playing, placing ninth in the Pac-10. 1983 was Oregon State's 13th consecutive losing season. The Beavers scored 171 points and allowed 332 points. The season is most memorable for the 0–0 tie with Oregon in the Civil War, the last scoreless game in NCAA Division I football history. The game is known colloquially as the "Toilet Bowl."

== Schedule ==
Date	Opponent	Site	TV	Result	Attendance	Source
September 3	at No. 14 Arizona	Arizona Stadium; Tucson, AZ		L 6–50	40,570	
September 10	at Portland State*	Civic Stadium; Portland, OR		W 51–14	26,102	
September 17	No. 14 USC	Parker Stadium; Corvallis, OR		L 10–33	28,000	
September 24	at Colorado*	Folsom Field; Boulder, CO		L 14–38	33,504	
October 1	UNLV*	Reser Stadium; Corvallis, OR		W 21–35 (forfeit win)	26,500	
October 8	at No. 16 Washington	Husky Stadium; Seattle, WA		L 7–35	58,693	
October 15	at California	California Memorial Stadium; Berkeley, CA	CBS	L 19–45	35,147	
October 29	Stanford^{†}	Parker Stadium; Corvallis, OR		W 31–18	22,000	
November 5	No. 20 Washington State	Parker Stadium; Corvallis, OR	ABC	L 9–27	32,500	
November 12	at Arizona State	Sun Devil Stadium; Tempe, AZ		L 3–38	65,058	
November 19	at Oregon	Autzen Stadium; Eugene, OR (Civil War)		T 0–0	33,176	
*Non-conference game; ^{†}Homecoming; Rankings from AP Poll released prior to the game

== Personnel ==
1983 Oregon State Beavers football team roster
Players
Coaches
Offense

Pos.	#	Name	Class
TE		Tracy Abernathy
WR		Robert Adams
RB		Donald Beavers
OL		Darrick Brilz
WR		Reggie Bynum
WR		Larry Clemons
WR		Claude Dixon
OL		Tom Emmons
RB		Tony Green
QB		Ricky Greene
RB		Lucius High
RB		Randy Holmes
OL		Dwayne Jackola
QB		Jay Kirschenman
TE		Mike Laverty
OL		Jack Lester
QB		Ladd McKittrick
OL		Rich Meggers
RB		Bryce Oglesby
TE		Paul Saunders
QB		Jeff Seay
QB		Jack Stanley
RB		James Terrell
OL		Mike Terry

Defense

Pos.	#	Name	Class
DL		Angelo Dilulo
DB		Reggie Dupree
DB		Tony Fuller
DL		John Gonzalez
DB		Jonathon Harrington
DL		Paul Hayes
LB		Ron Heller
LB		Bob Johnson
LB		James Murphy
DL		Chris Naone
DB		DeMonty Price
DL		Willie Stubblefield
DB		Kenny Taylor
DB		Bernie Wilson

Special teams

Pos.	#	Name	Class
K		Marty Breen
P		Chris Stempeck

Head coach

- Joe Avezzano

Coordinators/assistant coaches

Legend

- (C) Team captain
- (S) Suspended
- (I) Ineligible
- Injured
- Redshirt
