= 1983 Washington Huskies football team =

American college football season

1983 Washington Huskies football

Aloha Bowl, L 10–13 vs. Penn State
- Conference: Pacific-10 Conference
- Record: 8–4 (5–2 Pac-10)
- Head coach: Don James (9th season)
- Offensive coordinator: Bob Stull (5th season)
- Defensive coordinator: Jim Lambright (6th season)
- MVP: Steve Pelluer
- Captains: Steve Pelluer; Rick Mallory; Stewart Hill; Dean Browning
- Home stadium: Husky Stadium

1983 Pacific-10 Conference football standings
| | Conf. | | | | | Overall |
| Team | W | | L | | T | W | | L | | T |
|---|---|---|---|---|---|---|---|---|---|---|
| No. 17 UCLA $ | 6 | – | 1 | – | 1 | 7 | – | 4 | – | 1 |
| Washington | 5 | – | 2 | – | 0 | 8 | – | 4 | – | 0 |
| Washington State | 5 | – | 3 | – | 0 | 7 | – | 4 | – | 0 |
| USC | 4 | – | 3 | – | 0 | 4 | – | 6 | – | 1 |
| Arizona | 4 | – | 3 | – | 1 | 7 | – | 3 | – | 1 |
| Arizona State | 3 | – | 3 | – | 1 | 6 | – | 4 | – | 1 |
| Oregon | 3 | – | 3 | – | 1 | 4 | – | 6 | – | 1 |
| California | 3 | – | 4 | – | 1 | 5 | – | 5 | – | 1 |
| Oregon State | 1 | – | 6 | – | 1 | 3 | – | 7 | – | 1 |
| Stanford | 1 | – | 7 | – | 0 | 1 | – | 10 | – | 0 |
$ – Conference champion; Rankings from AP Poll

The 1983 Washington Huskies football team was an American football team that represented the University of Washington during the 1983 NCAA Division I-A football season. In its ninth season under head coach Don James, the team was 8–3 in the regular season (5–2 in the Pacific-10 Conference, second), and outscored its opponents 285 to 178.

The Huskies shut out USC 24–0 to improve to 8–2, were ranked fifteenth in the AP poll, with the inside track to the Rose Bowl. They dropped their final two games, the Apple Cup in Seattle, and the Aloha Bowl to Penn State.

Senior quarterback Steve Pelluer was selected as the team's most valuable player. Pelluer, Dean Browning, Stewart Hill, and Rick Mallory were the team captains.

== Schedule ==
| Date | Opponent | Rank | Site | TV | Result | Attendance | Source |
|---|---|---|---|---|---|---|---|
| September 10 | at Northwestern* | No. 19 | Dyche Stadium; Evanston, IL | | W 34–0 | 26,165 | |
| September 17 | No. 8 Michigan* | No. 16 | Husky Stadium; Seattle, WA | KOMO | W 25–24 | 60,638 | |
| September 24 | at LSU* | No. 9 | Tiger Stadium; Baton Rouge, LA | | L 14–40 | 82,390 | |
| October 1 | Navy* | No. 18 | Husky Stadium; Seattle, WA | | W 27–10 | 59,912 | |
| October 8 | Oregon State | No. 16 | Husky Stadium; Seattle, WA | | W 34–7 | 60,354 | |
| October 15 | Stanford | No. 17 | Husky Stadium; Seattle, WA | | W 32–15 | 60,270 | |
| October 22 | at Oregon | No. 14 | Autzen Stadium; Eugene, OR (rivalry) | KOMO | W 32–3 | 44,303 | |
| October 29 | at UCLA | No. 11 | Rose Bowl; Pasadena, CA | | L 24–27 | 60,094 | |
| November 5 | at Arizona | No. 20 | Arizona Stadium; Tucson, AZ | | W 23–22 | 48,808 | |
| November 12 | USC | No. 18 | Husky Stadium; Seattle, WA | | W 24–0 | 60,690 | |
| November 19 | Washington State | No. 15 | Husky Stadium; Seattle, WA (Apple Cup) | CBS | L 6–17 | 59,220 | |
| December 26 | vs. Penn State* | | Aloha Stadium; Halawa, HI (Aloha Bowl) | Metro | L 10–13 | 37,212 | |
*Non-conference game; Rankings from AP Poll released prior to the game

== Game summaries ==
=== Navy ===
| Team | 1 | 2 | 3 | 4 | Total |
|---|---|---|---|---|---|
| Midshipmen | 7 | 0 | 3 | 0 | 10 |
| • No. 18 Huskies | 3 | 10 | 0 | 14 | 27 |

- Date: October 1
- Location: Husky Stadium, Seattle

Scoring summary
| 1 | NAVY | Stevens 4-yard pass from Williamson (Young kick) | NAVY 7-0 |
| 1 | WASH | Jaeger 33-yard field goal | NAVY 7-3 |
| 2 | WASH | Jaeger 35-yard field goal | NAVY 7-6 |
| 2 | WASH | Greene 26-yard pass from Pelluer (Jaeger kick) | WASH 13-7 |
| 3 | NAVY | Young 21-yard field goal | WASH 13-10 |
| 4 | WASH | Lutu 2-yard pass from Pelluer (Jaeger kick) | WASH 20-10 |
| 4 | WASH | Hinds 53-yard run (Jaeger kick) | WASH 27-10 |

=== USC ===
| Team | 1 | 2 | 3 | 4 | Total |
|---|---|---|---|---|---|
| Trojans | 0 | 0 | 0 | 0 | 0 |
| • No. 18 Huskies | 0 | 10 | 7 | 7 | 24 |

- Date: November 12
- Location: Husky Stadium
- Game attendance: 59,190
- Game weather: Rain

Scoring summary
| Q2 | | WASH | Jaeger yard field goal | WASH 3–0 |
| Q2 | | WASH | Greene 39 yard pass from Peuller (Jaeger kick) | WASH 10–0 |
| Q3 | 3:41 | WASH | Greene 71 yard punt return (Jaeger kick) | WASH 17–0 |
| Q4 | | WASH | Feeney 1 yard run (Jaeger kick) | WASH 24–0 |

== Roster ==
1983 Washington Huskies football team roster
Players
Coaches
Offense

| Pos. | # | Name | Class |
|---|---|---|---|
| G | 64 | Ted Brose | Sr |
| OT | 70 | Lance Dodson | Sr |
| C | 51 | Dan Eernissee | Jr |
| SE | 80 | Danny Greene | Jr |
| TB | 22 | Sterling Hinds | Sr |
| FB | 45 | Walt Hunt | Jr |
| OT | 75 | Dennis Maher | Jr |
| G | 55 | Rick Mallory (C) | Sr |
| SE | 19 | Mark Pattison | Jr |
| QB | 16 | Steve Pelluer (C) | Sr |
| QB | 14 | Paul Sicuro | Jr |
| FL | 9 | Dave Stransky | Sr |
| TE | 88 | Tony Wroten | Jr |

Defense

| Pos. | # | Name | Class |
|---|---|---|---|
| SS | 6 | Vince Albritton | Sr |
| DT | 99 | Dean Browning (C) | Sr |
| LB | 56 | Ron Hadley | So |
| LB | 46 | Stewart Hill (C) | Jr |
| DT | 90 | Ron Holmes | Jr |
| CB | 24 | Vestee Jackson | So |
| LB | 56 | Joe Krakoski | Jr |
| FS | 24 | Robert Leaphart | Sr |
| MG | 68 | Lynn Madsen | Sr |
| LB | 42 | Tim Meamber | Jr |
| CB | 12 | Ron Milus | So |
| CB | 4 | J. C. Pearson | Jr |
| FS | 39 | Jim Rodgers | Jr |
| LB | 5 | Fred Small | Jr |

Special teams

| Pos. | # | Name | Class |
|---|---|---|---|
| P | 94 | Thane Cleland | Fr |
| K | 18 | Jeff Jaeger | Fr |

Head coach

- Don James (9th year)

Coordinators/assistant coaches

- Bob Stull – OC
- Jim Lambright – DC

Legend

- (C) Team captain
- (S) Suspended
- (I) Ineligible
- Injured
- Redshirt

== NFL draft ==
Three Huskies were selected in the 1984 NFL draft.

| Player | Position | Round | Overall | Franchise |
|---|---|---|---|---|
| Steve Pelluer | QB | 5 | 113 | Dallas Cowboys |
| Scott Garnett | DT | 8 | 218 | Denver Broncos |
| Rick Mallory | G | 9 | 225 | Tampa Bay Buccaneers |

== Notes ==
- Steve Pelluer set a new University of Washington record for passing yards in a season with 2,365 yards. This eclipsed Sonny Sixkiller's 2,303 yards from 1970. The record is currently held by Michael Penix, Jr..
