= Oregon–Oregon State football rivalry =

American college football rivalry

Oregon–Oregon State Rivalry Series
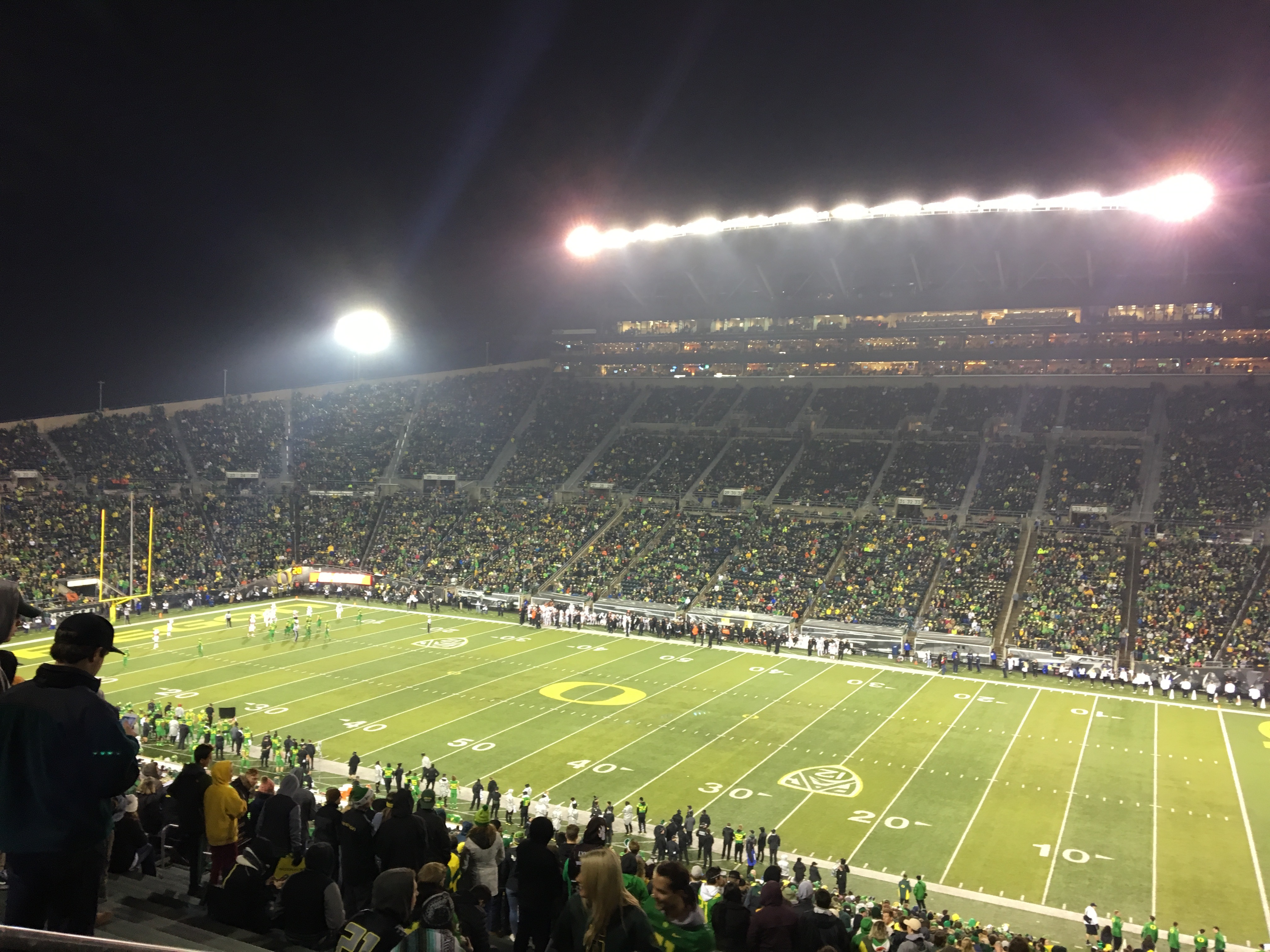
- 2017 game at Autzen Stadium

- Oregon Ducks Oregon State Beavers
- Other names: Oregon Classic (1894–1928); State Championship Game (1894–1928); Civil War (1929–2020)
- Sport: College football
- First meeting: November 3, 1894; 132 years ago OAC 16, Oregon 0
- Latest meeting: September 20, 2025; Oregon 41, Oregon State 7
- Next meeting: September 16, 2028
- Stadiums: Autzen Stadium (Oregon); Reser Stadium (Oregon State)
- Trophy: Platypus Trophy (1959–1961, 2007–present)

Statistics
- Total meetings: 129
- Most wins: Oregon
- All-time series: Oregon leads, 70–49–10 (.581)
- Largest victory: Oregon, 69–10 (2017)
- Longest win streak: Oregon, 8 (1975–1982, 2008–2015); Oregon State, 8 (1964–1971)
- Current win streak: Oregon, 3 (2023–present)

The Oregon–Oregon State football rivalry, officially known as the Oregon–Oregon State Rivalry Series and also known as the Civil War, is an American college football rivalry game played almost annually in the state of Oregon between the Ducks of the University of Oregon in Eugene and the Beavers of Oregon State University in Corvallis.

First played 132 years ago in 1894 and renewed annually from 1945 through 2025, it is the fifth-most played college football rivalry game in the Football Bowl Subdivision, and the most-played rivalry in the Western United States. The campuses are less than fifty miles (80 km) apart in the Willamette Valley. Following 2024 conference realignment Oregon State and Oregon are no longer members of the same conference, thus the game must be added to each program's non-conference schedule. The 2026 season marked the first since before WW2 that the teams did not meet on the gridiron. Oregon State is still a member of the Pac-12 Conference while Oregon moved to the Big Ten Conference. Though not officially recognized by the universities, the Platypus Trophy is awarded annually to the winning team’s alumni association.

== Series history ==
The game was first played in 1894 and has been contested 129 times through 2025, annually since 1945. Two games were played in 1896 and 1945 and the game was not held in 1900, 1901, 1911, 1943, and 1944. The game will not be played in 2026 due to scheduling conflicts caused by Oregon's move to the Big Ten Conference, though the series is set to resume in 2027. Oregon leads the series 70–49–10 (.581).

The first reference to the "Civil War" name was in 1929 and came into common use in 1937. Prior to that, it was called the "Oregon Classic" or the "State Championship Game." With athletes, alumni, and boosters questioning the name, usage of the "Civil War" name was officially discontinued in 2020 amid a wave of name changes sparked by the George Floyd protests, though the name is still colloquially used by fans of both teams.

The game is usually played in even-numbered years at the home field of Oregon State in Corvallis (Reser Stadium, formerly Parker Stadium, beginning in 1954) and in odd-numbered years at the home field of Oregon in Eugene (since 1967, Autzen Stadium). Seven games were played at Multnomah Field/Stadium (now Providence Park) in Portland: in 1908, 1917, 1933, 1934, 1938, 1950, and 1952. In an effort to mitigate rioting, the 1912 and 1913 games were played at a neutral site in Albany following riots after the 1910 game that led to the 1911 game's cancellation. Until the opening of Autzen Stadium in 1967, it was one of the Webfoots/Ducks' few conference home games played at the UO's tiny on-campus stadium, Hayward Field.

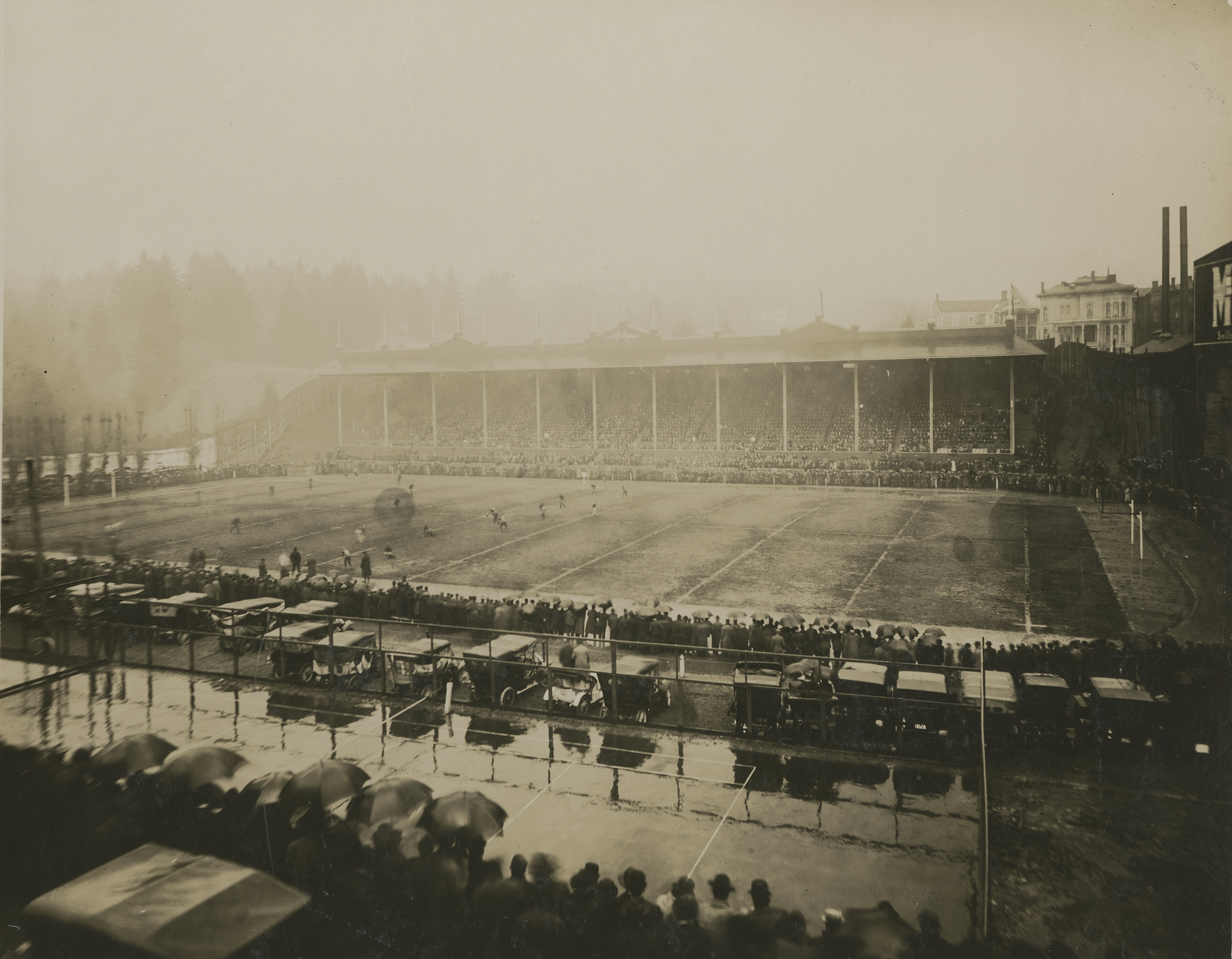
1908 Beavers v Ducks game at Multnomah Stadium, Portland

From 1997 through 2006, the home team won the game. The streak was snapped in 2007, when Oregon State beat Oregon at Autzen Stadium 38–31 in double overtime. In 2008, the Ducks returned the favor in Corvallis by beating OSU 65–38. The streak of visiting teams winning was snapped at two games in 2009 when the Ducks won 37–33 in Eugene.

From 1959 to 1961, the Platypus Trophy was awarded to the winner; it was lost for over forty years and finally found in 2005. Beginning with the 2007 game, it is awarded to the winning school's alumni association. A different trophy was awarded following the game in 1980.

Both share the longest winning streak in the series at eight games, but the Ducks had an undefeated run of thirteen games (1975–1987), with twelve wins and a scoreless tie in 1983.

In 2023, Oregon announced it would move from the Pac-12 Conference to the Big Ten Conference beginning with the 2024 season, turning the rivalry with Oregon State into a nonconference game and putting continuation of the series in jeopardy. Following the conclusion of the 2023 season, the teams announced the series would continue for at least two more years. In September 2025, it was announced that the rivalry would continue for at least 6 more games beginning in 2027 after a 1-year break in 2026, with Oregon continuing to host in odd years and Oregon State hosting in even years. In May 2026, the schools officially announced a four-game series. The games in 2028 and 2032 will be held in Corvallis, and the games in 2029 and 2031 will be held in Eugene.

== Memorable games ==
Locations of Oregon and Oregon State

1933: In a game played before 32,183 spectators at Multnomah Stadium in Portland, both teams came into the game undefeated: the Beavers were 5–0–2 and the Ducks were 7–0. The Beavers scored first, but the rest was all Oregon, with fullback (and future Chicago Cardinal) "Iron Mike" Mikulak rushing for 89 yards on the way to a 13–3 victory. The Webfoots won a share of the PCC championship, but Stanford got the bid to the Rose Bowl.

1957: The Ducks had a 6–1 conference record and the Beavers were 5–2. A Beaver win at Hayward Field would give them a share of the conference title, but since the Beavers had been to the previous season's Rose Bowl, the Pacific Coast Conference's no-repeat rule meant that no matter what, the Ducks were headed for Pasadena on New Year's Day, their first Rose Bowl appearance since January 1920. Both teams scored on their first possession, but that ended the scoring until late in the third quarter, when Beaver kicker Ted Searle put Oregon State on top, 10–7. A late fumble by the Ducks' Jim Shanley secured the win—but not the Rose Bowl—for Oregon State.

1959: The Ducks came into the game with just one loss. An Oregon win, coupled with a Washington loss, could have earned the Ducks a Rose Bowl invitation. Meanwhile, Oregon State was 2–6, its first losing record in five years. The Beavers started shakily, fumbling on their first two possessions and falling behind 7–0 in the first quarter. The rest was all Beavers as they salvaged their season with two touchdowns and a field goal to upset the Ducks, 15–7.

1969: With the score tied at seven and less than a minute left, Oregon State placekicker Mike Nehl attempted a 29-yard field goal to put the Beavers ahead. Nehl had already had one field goal blocked and missed one field goal on the day, and this one was blocked by Oregon's Jim Franklin, hit an official, bounced off the foot of Oregon linebacker Don Graham, and was recovered by Oregon State tight end Bill Plumeau at the Duck four-yard line. Nehl again came on to try his fourth field goal, and this time, connected on a 21-yard kick to give the Beavers a 10–7 win—the sixth on the way to what would be eight straight OSU wins in the series. This was the first game played on artificial turf.

1983: Played during a torrential rainstorm and pitting two mediocre squads against each other, the game ended in a scoreless tie, and is commonly known as the "Toilet Bowl" due to the very poor standard of play in the game, which featured eleven fumbles (six for turnovers), five interceptions, and four missed field goals. It was also the last Division I football game to end in a scoreless tie, with the NCAA instituting overtime rules in 1996. This was also the tenth and final tie in the series, six of which were scoreless.

Oregon Journal sports page layout announcing the 1929 UO–OSC game was to be "designated this year as 'the civil war'."

1987: Oregon earned what was at the time the most lopsided victory in the series, a 44–0 drubbing led by Ducks quarterback Bill Musgrave.

1988: The Beavers last win was fourteen years earlier, and Oregon head coach Rich Brooks had not lost a game in the series in 21 attempts (18–0–3) as either a Ducks coach or Beavers coach or player. Both streaks ended on this day, as the Beavers scored two fourth quarter touchdowns for a 21–10 victory.

1994: Oregon needed a win at hostile Parker Stadium to secure a bid to the Rose Bowl, but trailed 13–10 in the fourth quarter. Quarterback Danny O'Neil took the Ducks on a 70-yard drive that culminated in a 19-yard pass to Dino Philyaw for a 17–13 win and their first Rose Bowl in 37 years.

1998: Oregon State prevails in double overtime (the first ever overtime game in the series), 44–41. Beaver fans rushed the field after the first overtime after the Ducks failed to score on fourth down, but a pass interference penalty gave the Ducks another chance. It took officials 15 minutes to clear the field, after which the Ducks scored to send the game to a second overtime. The Ducks managed a field goal in their possession, but Beavers running back Ken Simonton scored to give the Beavers an upset win, their fifth win of the season, and their best record since 1971.

2000: Oregon came into the game ranked #5 in the country with Oregon State at #8, the first time both teams had been ranked in the top 10 simultaneously. With a win, Oregon would go to the Rose Bowl; the Beavers needed a win to force a tie between the two teams, and keep alive hopes of going to the Rose Bowl. Oregon State won the game 23–13 to give the Beavers their first-ever 10-win season. However, they were shut out of the Rose Bowl when Washington beat Washington State later the same day. Oregon State was extended an at-large invitation to BCS' Fiesta Bowl, where they defeated Notre Dame 41–9.

2001: Oregon came into the game needing only a victory over their arch-rival for the team's first outright Pacific-10 Conference championship since 1994 and a trip to the Fiesta Bowl; the Beavers needed a win to secure a winning season. After OSU initially took a 6–3 lead into halftime, Oregon rallied behind a Keenan Howry punt return for a touchdown to give the Ducks a lead they would not relinquish, amidst a driving rainstorm. Final score: Ducks 17, Beavers 14.

2007: Oregon State wins 38–31 in double overtime at Autzen, the first road team to win the game in 10 attempts. The game featured a blocked Oregon State field goal with 1:01 remaining, followed by a missed Oregon field goal as regulation expired.

2008: Oregon State needed a victory to get a bid to the 2009 Rose Bowl, their first Rose Bowl in 44 years. Instead, Oregon ran away with a 65–38 blowout, setting series records for the most points scored by one team and the most total points scored.

2009: Called the "War for the Roses", because it was the first time a win guaranteed a Rose Bowl berth. In a back-and-forth game, Oregon won, 37–33. The Ducks represented the Pac-10 in the 2010 Rose Bowl, their first appearance since 1995.

2010: Oregon, coming into the game second in the Bowl Championship Series (BCS) standings, needed to win the game to secure a spot in the BCS championship game. Oregon State, at 5–6, needed a win to become bowl eligible. With ESPN's College GameDay staged in Corvallis for the first time, the Ducks won 37–20 to secure a spot against Auburn in the national title game.

2016: Oregon State RB Ryan Nall rushed for 155 yards and 4 touchdowns, as Oregon State beat Oregon 34–24, after the Beavers outscored the Ducks 13–0 in the 4th quarter to take the lead, and snap the Ducks' 8-game win streak in the rivalry from 2008 to 2015, which was tied for the longest ever in the rivalry. After the game, the Corvallis crowd stormed the field in celebration.

2017: Both the Ducks and Beavers entered this game carrying sub-par seasons. The Ducks stood at 6–5, while the Beavers were riding a nine-game losing streak at 1–10. The game was one for the history books, with Oregon rolling to a 69–10 win, setting records for the series in both points scored and margin of victory. It was Oregon's ninth win in the last ten meetings, and it offered a sense of revenge for the Ducks after dropping the prior year's meeting in Corvallis. Royce Freeman scored two rushing TDs in the first half of to break OSU's Ken Simonton's all-time Pac-12 rushing touchdown record, which stood at 59 for 16 years. It would mark Royce's 60th rushing touchdown for the Ducks. He also piled up 122 rushing yards which moved him into seventh all-time in NCAA history.

2020: In the COVID-19 pandemic-shortened 2020 season, No. 15 Oregon entered the game with a 3–0 record to Oregon State's 1–2. In the game Jermar Jefferson rushed for 226 yards which is the most rushing yards ever in a game in the rivalry. After dropping behind by 12 entering the fourth quarter, Jermar Jefferson led the Beavers to an improbable 41–38 win on a foggy night in Corvallis in front of an empty stadium, knocking the Ducks out of playoff contention and notching the Beavers' first victory over a ranked opponent since 2014.

2022: In the 2022 edition of the rivalry, Oregon entered the game ranked No. 9 in the country and Oregon State entered the game ranked No. 21 in the country. The Ducks stormed out to a 31–10 lead by the third quarter, but the Beavers, behind a potent rushing attack, scored touchdowns on all of their next four drives to take a 38–34 lead. The Ducks then went on a time-consuming drive, but failed to convert a fourth and goal at the Oregon State 3 yard line, thus allowing Oregon State to take possession. The Beavers then picked up a first down and ran out the clock to complete an improbable comeback.

2023: In the last matchup as Pac-12 conference opponents, Oregon won their 8th consecutive game of the series at home by a score of 31–7. The victory clinched a spot for the Ducks in the Pac-12 Championship Game.

== Notable game-related incidents ==
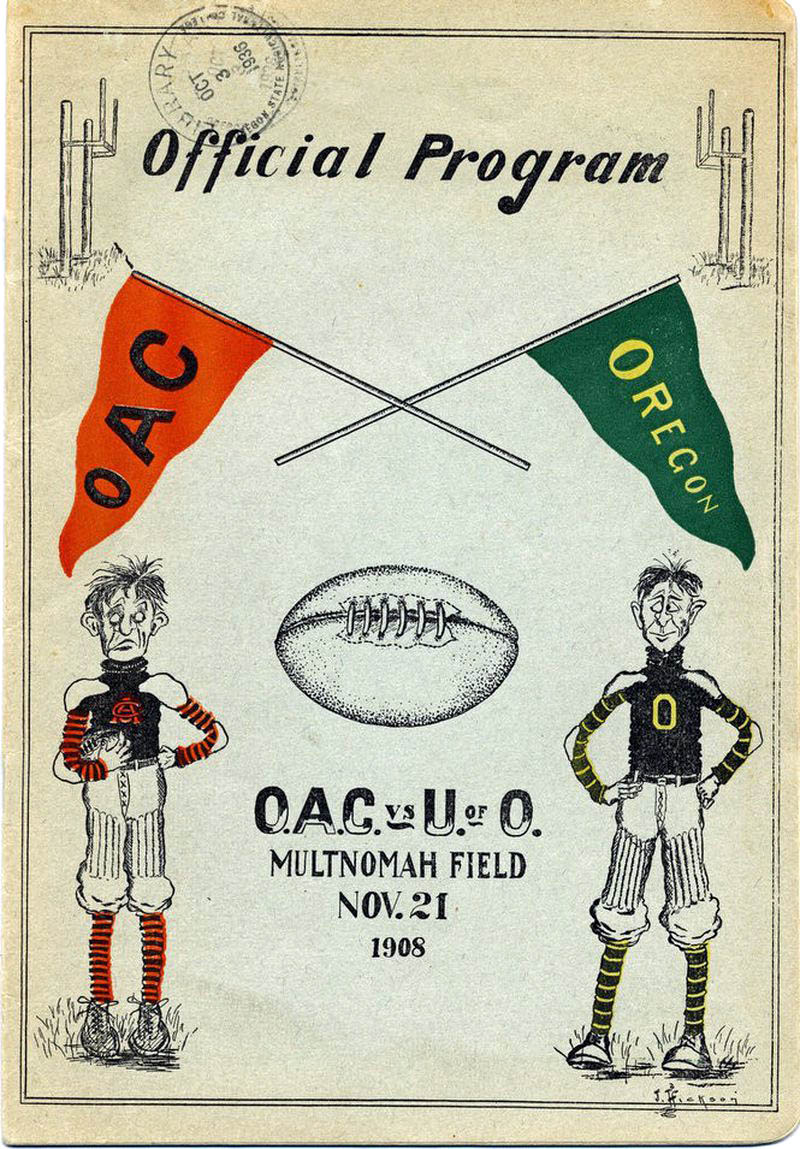
1908 illustrated game program, pitting the Oregon Agricultural College Aggies against the University of Oregon Webfoots.

1910: Following a 12–0 Oregon victory in Corvallis, fans of both teams began a verbal argument that escalated into exceedingly rowdy behavior as Webfoots fans returned to the train station to leave. The UO's public relations department spread stories of Oregon Agricultural College hooliganism to the statewide press, offending students of OAC and causing the rivalry to be suspended for 1911.

1937: After defeating Oregon 14–0 in Corvallis, Oregon State fans had a large rally the next evening that lasted for six hours. Approximately 2,000 Oregon State students decided to caravan the following day to Eugene and have another celebration. State police initially halted the group, then agreed to lead them through the town if they agreed to behave. However, once Oregon students got out of class, the situation escalated with Webfoots pelting Beavers with tomatoes and water balloons, some Oregon State students were thrown into the millrace, and other OSU students taken to Skinner Butte, stripped and forced to repaint the "O" hillside letter yellow and slide down the painted surface.

1954: Approximately 50 UO students infiltrated Corvallis and lit the traditional OSU homecoming bonfire early. While it had been done before, this time OSU students were able to capture 25 UO students and hold them "prisoner". The captured students had their heads shaved, were painted orange and black and some were forced to do menial labor for OSU fraternities. One captured UO student was marched through the OSU campus with a sign that said "I'm a dumb Duck". Meanwhile, the UO raiding party kidnapped a single OSU student and paraded him around the UO campus.

1960: A UO student (LH) and a friend (FF) abducted the Oregon State Homecoming queen Ardis Henry from in front of her sorority house while the front yard was being decorated by 20+ fraternity guys. The Oregon State student body president was served a ransom note, asking him to ride a bicyle or scooter to UofO and invite the Ducks to the Civil War game. Unfortunately, he was not in the same spirit, and refused. Ardis was a sweetheart, and went along with it as long as she made it back for dinner. She was returned with time to spare.

1972: After a 30–3 UO victory at Corvallis which ended an eight-game win streak in the series by the Beavers, Ducks fans stormed the OSU field to take down goal posts; after taking down the south goalposts, Beavers fans attempted to defend the north goalposts, resulting in a large brawl.

2010: After a 37–20 victory which sent the Ducks to the 2011 Tostitos BCS National Championship Game, a group of Duck fans lit on fire a t-shirt with the phrase "I hate your Ducks" over the Beavers logo on the field. The resulting fire caused significant damage to the artificial turf. Police used a photo of the incident from the Portland Tribune to arrest a University of Oregon student and charge him with riot and several misdemeanors.

2022: Following Oregon State's 38–34 win at Reser Stadium, UO linebacker DJ Johnson punched an Oregon State fan after what appeared to be some arguing between the two. No action was taken on the altercation.

== Game results ==
Oregon victories	Oregon State victories

No.	Date	Location	Winning team		Losing team	
1	November 3, 1894	Corvallis	Oregon Agricultural	16	Oregon	0
2	October 26, 1895	Eugene	Oregon	44	Oregon Agricultural	0
3	November 7, 1896	Eugene	Oregon	2	Oregon Agricultural	0
4	November 14, 1896	Corvallis	Oregon	12	Oregon Agricultural	8
5	November 20, 1897	Eugene	Oregon Agricultural	24	Oregon	8
6	December 10, 1898	Corvallis	Oregon	38	Oregon Agricultural	0
7	November 30, 1899	Eugene	Oregon	38	Oregon Agricultural	0
8	November 8, 1902	Corvallis	Tie	0	Tie	0
9	November 21, 1903	Eugene	Oregon	5	Oregon Agricultural	0
10	November 19, 1904	Corvallis	Oregon	6	Oregon Agricultural	5
11	November 11, 1905	Eugene	Oregon	6	Oregon Agricultural	0
12	November 24, 1906	Corvallis	Tie	0	Tie	0
13	November 9, 1907	Eugene	Oregon Agricultural	4	Oregon	0
14	November 21, 1908	Portland	Oregon	8	Oregon Agricultural	0
15	November 19, 1909	Eugene	Oregon	12	Oregon Agricultural	0
16	November 12, 1910	Corvallis	Oregon	12	Oregon Agricultural	0
17	November 23, 1912	Albany	Oregon	3	Oregon Agricultural	0
18	November 8, 1913	Albany	Tie	10	Tie	10
19	November 21, 1914	Corvallis	Tie	3	Tie	3
20	November 20, 1915	Eugene	Oregon	9	Oregon Agricultural	0
21	November 25, 1916	Corvallis	Oregon	27	Oregon Agricultural	0
22	November 29, 1917	Portland	Oregon Agricultural	14	Oregon	7
23	November 16, 1918	Corvallis	Oregon	13	Oregon Agricultural	6
24	November 15, 1919	Eugene	Oregon	9	Oregon Agricultural	0
25	November 20, 1920	Corvallis	Tie	0	Tie	0
26	November 19, 1921	Eugene	Tie	0	Tie	0
27	November 18, 1922	Corvallis	Oregon	10	Oregon Agricultural	0
28	November 24, 1923	Eugene	Oregon Agricultural	6	Oregon	0
29	November 22, 1924	Corvallis	Oregon	7	Oregon Agricultural	3
30	November 14, 1925	Eugene	Oregon Agricultural	24	Oregon	13
31	November 20, 1926	Corvallis	Oregon Agricultural	16	Oregon	0
32	November 11, 1927	Eugene	Oregon State	21	Oregon	7
33	November 17, 1928	Corvallis	Oregon	12	Oregon State	0
34	November 16, 1929	Eugene	Oregon	16	Oregon State	0
35	November 15, 1930	Corvallis	Oregon State	15	Oregon	0
36	November 14, 1931	Eugene	Tie	0	Tie	0
37	November 5, 1932	Corvallis	Oregon	12	Oregon State	6
38	November 11, 1933	Portland	Oregon	13	Oregon State	3
39	November 10, 1934	Portland	Oregon	9	Oregon State	6
40	November 9, 1935	Eugene	Oregon	13	Oregon State	0
41	November 21, 1936	Corvallis	Oregon State	18	Oregon	0
42	October 23, 1937	Eugene	Oregon State	14	Oregon	0
43	November 26, 1938	Portland	Oregon State	14	Oregon	0
44	November 11, 1939	Eugene	Oregon State	19	Oregon	14
45	November 30, 1940	Corvallis	Oregon	20	Oregon State	0
46	November 29, 1941	Eugene	#17 Oregon State	12	Oregon	7
47	November 21, 1942	Corvallis	Oregon State	39	Oregon	2
48	October 13, 1945	Corvallis	Oregon State	19	Oregon	6
49	December 1, 1945	Eugene	Oregon State	13	Oregon	12
50	November 23, 1946	Corvallis	Oregon State	13	Oregon	0
51	November 22, 1947	Eugene	Oregon	14	Oregon State	6
52	November 20, 1948	Corvallis	#13 Oregon	10	Oregon State	0
53	November 19, 1949	Eugene	Oregon State	20	Oregon	10
54	November 25, 1950	Portland	Oregon State	14	Oregon	2
55	November 24, 1951	Eugene	Oregon State	14	Oregon	7
56	November 22, 1952	Portland	Oregon State	22	Oregon	19
57	November 21, 1953	Eugene	Oregon State	7	Oregon	0
58	November 20, 1954	Corvallis	Oregon	33	Oregon State	14
59	November 19, 1955	Eugene	Oregon	28	#19 Oregon State	0
60	November 24, 1956	Corvallis	Tie	14	Tie	14
61	November 23, 1957	Eugene	Oregon State	10	#15 Oregon	7
62	November 22, 1958	Corvallis	Oregon	20	Oregon State	0
63	November 21, 1959	Eugene	Oregon State	15	#15 Oregon	7
64	November 19, 1960	Corvallis	Tie	14	Tie	14
65	November 25, 1961	Eugene	Oregon State	6	Oregon	2

No.	Date	Location	Winning team		Losing team	
66	November 24, 1962	Corvallis	Oregon State	20	Oregon	17
67	November 30, 1963	Eugene	Oregon	31	Oregon State	14
68	November 21, 1964	Corvallis	Oregon State	7	#10 Oregon	6
69	November 20, 1965	Eugene	Oregon State	19	Oregon	14
70	November 19, 1966	Corvallis	Oregon State	20	Oregon	15
71	November 18, 1967	Eugene	#8 Oregon State	14	Oregon	10
72	November 23, 1968	Corvallis	#16 Oregon State	41	Oregon	19
73	November 22, 1969	Eugene	Oregon State	10	Oregon	7
74	November 21, 1970	Corvallis	Oregon State	24	Oregon	9
75	November 20, 1971	Eugene	Oregon State	30	Oregon	29
76	November 18, 1972	Corvallis	Oregon	30	Oregon State	3
77	November 24, 1973	Eugene	Oregon State	17	Oregon	14
78	November 23, 1974	Corvallis	Oregon State	35	Oregon	16
79	November 22, 1975	Eugene	Oregon	14	Oregon State	7
80	November 20, 1976	Corvallis	Oregon	23	Oregon State	14
81	November 19, 1977	Eugene	Oregon	28	Oregon State	16
82	November 25, 1978	Corvallis	Oregon	24	Oregon State	3
83	November 29, 1979	Eugene	Oregon	24	Oregon State	3
84	November 15, 1980	Corvallis	Oregon	40	Oregon State	21
85	November 21, 1981	Eugene	Oregon	47	Oregon State	17
86	November 27, 1982	Corvallis	Oregon	7	Oregon State	6
87	November 19, 1983	Eugene	Tie	0	Tie	0
88	November 17, 1984	Corvallis	Oregon	31	Oregon State	6
89	November 23, 1985	Eugene	Oregon	34	Oregon State	13
90	November 22, 1986	Corvallis	Oregon	49	Oregon State	28
91	November 21, 1987	Eugene	Oregon	44	Oregon State	0
92	November 19, 1988	Corvallis	Oregon State	21	Oregon	10
93	November 18, 1989	Eugene	Oregon	30	Oregon State	21
94	November 17, 1990	Corvallis	Oregon	6	Oregon State	3
95	November 23, 1991	Eugene	Oregon State	14	Oregon	3
96	November 21, 1992	Corvallis	Oregon	7	Oregon State	0
97	November 20, 1993	Eugene	Oregon State	15	Oregon	12
98	November 19, 1994	Corvallis	#12 Oregon	17	Oregon State	13
99	November 18, 1995	Eugene	#16 Oregon	12	Oregon State	10
100	November 23, 1996	Corvallis	Oregon	49	Oregon State	13
101	November 22, 1997	Eugene	Oregon	48	Oregon State	30
102	November 21, 1998	Corvallis	Oregon State	44	#15 Oregon	41^{2OT}
103	November 20, 1999	Eugene	Oregon	25	Oregon State	14
104	November 18, 2000	Corvallis	#4 Oregon State	23	#5 Oregon	13
105	December 1, 2001	Eugene	#4 Oregon	17	Oregon State	14
106	November 23, 2002	Corvallis	Oregon State	45	Oregon	24
107	November 22, 2003	Eugene	Oregon	34	Oregon State	20
108	November 20, 2004	Corvallis	Oregon State	50	Oregon	21
109	November 19, 2005	Eugene	#10 Oregon	56	Oregon State	14
110	November 24, 2006	Corvallis	Oregon State	30	Oregon	28
111	December 1, 2007	Eugene	Oregon State	38	#18 Oregon	31^{2OT}
112	November 29, 2008	Corvallis	#19 Oregon	65	#17 Oregon State	38
113	December 3, 2009	Eugene	#7 Oregon	37	#13 Oregon State	33
114	December 4, 2010	Corvallis	#1 Oregon	37	Oregon State	20
115	November 26, 2011	Eugene	#9 Oregon	49	Oregon State	21
116	November 24, 2012	Corvallis	#5 Oregon	48	#16 Oregon State	24
117	November 29, 2013	Eugene	#12 Oregon	36	Oregon State	35
118	November 29, 2014	Corvallis	#3 Oregon	47	Oregon State	19
119	November 27, 2015	Eugene	#18 Oregon	52	Oregon State	42
120	November 26, 2016	Corvallis	Oregon State	34	Oregon	24
121	November 25, 2017	Eugene	Oregon	69	Oregon State	10
122	November 23, 2018	Corvallis	Oregon	55	Oregon State	15
123	November 30, 2019	Eugene	#14 Oregon	24	Oregon State	10
124	November 27, 2020	Corvallis	Oregon State	41	#15 Oregon	38
125	November 27, 2021	Eugene	#11 Oregon	38	Oregon State	29
126	November 26, 2022	Corvallis	#21 Oregon State	38	#9 Oregon	34
127	November 24, 2023	Eugene	#6 Oregon	31	#16 Oregon State	7
128	September 14, 2024	Corvallis	#9 Oregon	49	Oregon State	14
129	September 20, 2025	Eugene	#6 Oregon	41	Oregon State	7
Series: Oregon leads 70–49–10

== Coaching records since 1945 ==
=== Oregon ===
Head coach	Team	Games	Seasons	Wins	Losses	Ties	Pct.
Tex Oliver	Oregon	3	1945–46	0	3	0	.000
Jim Aiken	Oregon	4	1947–50	2	2	0	.500
Len Casanova	Oregon	16	1951–66	4	10	2	.313
Jerry Frei	Oregon	5	1967–71	0	5	0	.000
Dick Enright	Oregon	2	1972–73	1	1	0	.500
Don Read	Oregon	3	1974–76	2	1	0	.667
Rich Brooks	Oregon	18	1977–94	14	3	1	.806
Mike Bellotti	Oregon	14	1995–2008	8	6	0	.571
Chip Kelly	Oregon	4	2009–12	4	0		1.000
Mark Helfrich	Oregon	4	2013–16	3	1		.750
Willie Taggart	Oregon	1	2017	1	0		1.000
Mario Cristobal	Oregon	4	2018–21	3	1		.750
Dan Lanning	Oregon	4	2022–25	3	1		.750

=== Oregon State ===
Head coach	Team	Games	Seasons	Wins	Losses	Ties	Pct.
Lon Stiner	Oregon State	5	1945–48	3	2	0	.600
Kip Taylor	Oregon State	6	1949–54	5	1	0	.833
Tommy Prothro	Oregon State	10	1955–64	5	3	2	.600
Dee Andros	Oregon State	11	1965–75	9	2	0	.818
Craig Fertig	Oregon State	4	1976–79	0	4	0	.000
Joe Avezzano	Oregon State	5	1980–84	0	4	1	.100
Dave Kragthorpe	Oregon State	6	1985–90	1	5	0	.167
Jerry Pettibone	Oregon State	6	1991–96	2	4	0	.333
Mike Riley (a)	Oregon State	2	1997–98	1	1		.500
Dennis Erickson	Oregon State	4	1999–2002	2	2		.500
Mike Riley (b)	Oregon State	12	2003–14	3	9		.250
Gary Andersen	Oregon State	2	2015–16	1	1		.500
Cory Hall (interim)	Oregon State	1	2017	0	1		.000
Jonathan Smith	Oregon State	6	2018–23	2	4		.333
Trent Bray	Oregon State	2	2024–25	0	2		.000

- Last tie was in 1983; overtime began in 1996 in Division I-A (two: 1998, 2007; both won by OSU in double overtime).
- Two games were played in 1896 and 1945.

== See also ==
- Oregon–Oregon State rivalry
- List of NCAA college football rivalry games
- List of most-played college football series in NCAA Division I
