= Southeast Missouri State Redhawks football =

Intercollegiate American football team

2026 Southeast Missouri State Redhawks football team
- First season: 1902; 124 years ago
- Athletic director: Brady Barke
- Head coach: Tom Matukewicz; 13th season, 66–68 (.493)
- Location: Cape Girardeau, Missouri
- Stadium: Houck Stadium (capacity: 11,015)
- NCAA division: Division I FCS
- Conference: Ohio Valley
- Colors: Red and black
- All-time record: 505–569–37 (.471)

Conference championships
- MIAA: 1937, 1942, 1946, 1955, 1957, 1958, 1959, 1962, 1967, 1968, 1969, 1973, 1975, 1976, 1977, 1987, 1988 OVC: 2010, 2019, 2022 OVC–Big South: 2024
- Website: gosoutheast.com

The Southeast Missouri State Redhawks football program is the intercollegiate American football team for the Southeast Missouri State University located in Cape Girardeau, Missouri. The team competes in the NCAA Division I Football Championship Subdivision (FCS) and are members of the Ohio Valley Conference. The school's first football team was fielded in 1902. The team plays its home games at the 11,015-seat Houck Stadium. They are coached by Tom Matukewicz.

== History ==
Southeast Missouri State first competed in football in 1904. In 1912, the school joined the Missouri Intercollegiate Athletics Association (MIAA), which later joined the NCAA as a Division II conference. The football team had its first known head coach, J.F. Corleux, in 1915. Corleux remained head coach until 1929.

In 1991, Southeast Missouri State joined the Ohio Valley Conference and moved up to the Division I-AA level.

=== Classifications ===
- 1952–1957: NAIA
- 1958–1972: NCAA College Division
- 1973–1990: NCAA Division II
- 1991–present: NCAA Division I–AA/FCS

=== Conference memberships ===
- 1902–1923: Independent
- 1924–1990: Mid-America Intercollegiate Athletics Association
- 1991–present: Ohio Valley Conference

== Conference championships ==
Southeast Missouri State has won 21 conference championships, 12 outright and nine shared.

Season	Conference	Coach	Overall Record	Conference Record
1937	Missouri Intercollegiate Athletic Association	Abe Stuber	9–0	5–0
1942†	Missouri Intercollegiate Athletic Association	Abe Stuber	4–2–1	3–1
1946	Missouri Intercollegiate Athletic Association	Abe Stuber	8–0–1	5–0
1955	Missouri Intercollegiate Athletic Association	Kenneth Knox	9–0	5–0
1957	Missouri Intercollegiate Athletic Association	Kenneth Knox	6–2–1	4–0–1
1958	Missouri Intercollegiate Athletic Association	Kenneth Knox	7–1–1	5–0
1959	Missouri Intercollegiate Athletic Association	Kenneth Knox	7–2	5–0
1962	Missouri Intercollegiate Athletic Association	Kenneth Knox	7–3	5–0
1967	Missouri Intercollegiate Athletic Association	Kenneth Knox	8–2	5–0
1968	Missouri Intercollegiate Athletic Association	Tom Thrower	6–4	5–0
1969†	Missouri Intercollegiate Athletic Association	Tom Thrower	8–2	4–1
1973	Missouri Intercollegiate Athletic Association	Jim Lohr	6–4	5–1
1975	Missouri Intercollegiate Athletic Association	Jim Lohr	7–4	6–0
1976†	Missouri Intercollegiate Athletic Association	Jim Lohr	7–3–1	4–1–1
1977†	Missouri Intercollegiate Athletic Association	Jim Lohr	7–3–1	4–1–1
1987†	Missouri Intercollegiate Athletic Association	Bob Smith	6–4–1	4–0–1
1988†	Missouri Intercollegiate Athletic Association	Bill Maskill	6–4	5–1
2010	Ohio Valley Conference	Tony Samuel	9–3	7–1
2019†	Ohio Valley Conference	Tom Matukewicz	9–3	7–1
2022†	Ohio Valley Conference	Tom Matukewicz	9–3	5–0
2024†	Big South–OVC Football Association	Tom Matukewicz	9–3	6–2

† Co-champions

== Playoff appearances ==
=== NCAA Division I-AA/FCS ===
The Redhawks have made five appearances in the Division I–AA/FCS playoffs, with a combined record of 1–5.

Year	Round	Opponent	Result
2010	Second round	Eastern Washington	L 17–37
2018	First round Second round	Stony Brook; Weber State	W 28–14; L 23–48
2019	First Round	Illinois State	L 6–24
2022	First Round	Montana	L 24–34
2024	First Round	Illinois State	L 27–35

== Rivalries ==
Southeast Missouri State has an in-state rivalry with Missouri State. The two schools last played in 2008, and Missouri State leads the series 46–28.

Another rivalry is with Southern Illinois. The annual series between the schools went on hiatus after 2005 and resumed in 2010. In 2013, the two schools played in a game called the College Classic, at Busch Stadium in St. Louis. In the first-ever football game held at Busch, Southern Illinois won 36–19. In 2018, the rivalry game was dubbed the "War of the Wheel". The winner of the "War of the Wheel" takes home an authentic ship's wheel. Southeast Missouri State leads the series 44–40–8 as of 2024.

Within the Ohio Valley Conference, Southeast Missouri State's rival was Murray State. Murray State left the Ohio Valley Conference to join the Missouri Valley Conference for football on July 1, 2023. The two schools last played in 2022, which was the last Ohio Valley Conference game for Murray State. Murray State leads the series 43–14–1.

== Notable former players ==
Name	Years played	Position
Eugene Amano	2000–2003	C
Dan Connolly	2001–2005	OT
Kenneth Dement	1951–1955	OT/DT
Kendall Donnerson	2014-2017	DE
Mike Ford	2013-2017	CB
Drew Forbes	2015-2019	OG
Ray Goodson	2001–2004	TE
Ken Iman	1958–1959	C
Edgar Jones	2003–2006	LB
Dimitri Patterson	2001–2004	CB
Willie Ponder	1999–2002	WR
Jon Robinson	1996–1998	DT
Angel Rubio	1993–1997	DT
Zach Hall	2016–2019	LB
Marquis Walker	1992–1995	CB
Kristian Wilkerson	2015–2019	WR
Mike Wood	1974–1977	K
Ryan Flournoy	2022-2023	

Donald Cross 1963-1965 DE

== Current coaching staff ==
Name	Position
Tom Matukewicz	Head coach
Ricky Coon	Defensive coordinator
Jeromy McDowell	Offensive coordinator/quarterbacks
Justin Drudik	Wide receivers/offensive passing game coordinator
Ray Smith	Defensive Backs/Defensive pass game coordinator
Jerone Williams	Defensive line
Cole Cook	Tight ends
Tim Billings	Outside linebackers
Connor Benado	Inside linebackers
Lucas Orchard	Offensive line
Isasc Reed	Running backs
Luke Berblinger	Recruiting coordinator
Lucas Orchard	Graduate assistant
Jesse Stilley	Graduate assistant
Brett Blackman	Director of operations/equipment manager
Ryan Napoli	Director of sports performance

== Future non-conference opponents ==
Announced schedules as of July 27, 2026.

2026	2027	2028	2029	2030
at Indiana State	Indiana State	at Missouri	at Ole Miss	at Missouri
at Iowa State	at Kansas	at Southern Illinois	at North Alabama	
at Southern Illinois	at Central Arkansas	West Georgia	at West Georgia	
Central Arkansas	Southern Illinois			
West Florida	at Eastern Kentucky			
