= 1987 Southeast Missouri State Indians football team =

American college football season

1987 Southeast Missouri State Indians football

MIAA co-champion
- Conference: Missouri Intercollegiate Athletic Association
- Record: 6–4–1 (4–0–1 MIAA)
- Head coach: Bob Smith (4th season)
- Home stadium: Houck Stadium

1987 Missouri Intercollegiate Athletic Association football standings
	Conf.					Overall
Team	W		L		T	W		L		T
Central Missouri State +	4	–	0	–	1	7	–	3	–	1
SE Missouri State +	4	–	0	–	1	6	–	4	–	1
NE Missouri State	3	–	2	–	0	4	–	7	–	0
Missouri–Rolla	2	–	3	–	0	5	–	5	–	0
NW Missouri State	1	–	4	–	0	3	–	8	–	0
Lincoln (MO)	0	–	5	–	0	2	–	9	–	0
+ – Conference co-champions

The 1987 Southeast Missouri State Indians football team represented Southeast Missouri State University as a memberof the Missouri Intercollegiate Athletic Association (MIAA) during the 1987 NCAA Division II football season. Led by fourth-year head coach Bob Smith, the Indians compiled an overall record of 6–4–1 with a mark of 4–0–1 in conference play, sharing the MIAA title with Central Missouri State. Southeast Missouri State played home games at Houck Stadium in Cape Girardeau, Missouri.

== Schedule ==
Date	Opponent	Site	Result	Attendance	Source
September 5	Troy State*	Houck Stadium; Cape Girardeau, MO	W 18–17	5,500	
September 12	at Murray State*	Roy Stewart Stadium; Murray, KY	L 12–30	6,250	
September 19	UT Martin*	Houck Stadium; Cape Girardeau, MO	L 13–25	6,900	
September 26	at Delta State*	Travis E. Parker Field; Cleveland, MS	L 28–35	5,475	
October 3	Northwest Missouri State	Houck Stadium; Cape Girardeau, MO	W 49–0	7,700	
October 10	at Lincoln (MO)	Dwight T. Reed Stadium; Jefferson City, MO	W 31–0	400	
October 17	at Central Missouri State	Audrey J. Walton Stadium; Warrensburg, MO	T 24–24	5,000	
October 24	at Southwest Baptist*	Plaster Stadium; Bolivar, MO	L 24–31	1,500	
October 31	Northeast Missouri State^{†}	Houck Stadium; Cape Girardeau, MO	W 21–9	7,900	
November 7	Missouri–Rolla	Houck Stadium; Cape Girardeau, MO	W 16–0	5,000	
November 14	Mississippi College*	Houck Stadium; Cape Girardeau, MO	W 30–28	1,900	
*Non-conference game; ^{†}Homecoming
