= 1983 Arizona State Sun Devils football team =

American college football season

1983 Arizona State Sun Devils football
- Conference: Pacific-10 Conference
- Record: 6–4–1 (3–3–1 Pac-10)
- Head coach: Darryl Rogers (4th season)
- Defensive coordinator: Al Luginbill (2nd season)
- Home stadium: Sun Devil Stadium

1983 Pacific-10 Conference football standings
	Conf.					Overall
Team	W		L		T	W		L		T
No. 17 UCLA $	6	–	1	–	1	7	–	4	–	1
Washington	5	–	2	–	0	8	–	4	–	0
Washington State	5	–	3	–	0	7	–	4	–	0
USC	4	–	3	–	0	4	–	6	–	1
Arizona	4	–	3	–	1	7	–	3	–	1
Arizona State	3	–	3	–	1	6	–	4	–	1
Oregon	3	–	3	–	1	4	–	6	–	1
California	3	–	4	–	1	5	–	5	–	1
Oregon State	1	–	6	–	1	3	–	7	–	1
Stanford	1	–	7	–	0	1	–	10	–	0
$ – Conference champion; Rankings from AP Poll

The 1983 Arizona State Sun Devils football team was an American football team that represented Arizona State University as a member of the Pacific-10 Conference (Pac-10) during the 1983 NCAA Division I-A football season. In their fourth season under head coach Darryl Rogers, the Sun Devils compiled a 6–4–1 record (3–3–1 against Pac-10 opponents), finished in a tie for sixth place in the Pac-10, and outscored their opponents by a combined total of 320 to 200.

The team's statistical leaders included Tod Hons with 2,394 passing yards, Darryl Clack with 932 rushing yards, and Don Kern with 502 receiving yards.

== Schedule ==
Date	Opponent	Rank	Site	Result	Attendance	Source
September 10	Utah State*		Sun Devil Stadium; Tempe, AZ	W 39–12	65,290	
September 17	at UCLA		Rose Bowl; Pasadena, CA	T 26–26	47,093	
September 24	Wichita State*		Sun Devil Stadium; Tempe, AZ	W 44–14	63,585	
October 1	Stanford	No. 20	Sun Devil Stadium; Tempe, AZ	W 29–11	53,795	
October 15	at USC	No. 18	Los Angeles Memorial Coliseum; Los Angeles, CA	W 34–14	58,664	
October 22	Washington State	No. 13	Sun Devil Stadium; Tempe, AZ	L 21–31	67,516	
October 29	Florida State*		Sun Devil Stadium; Tempe, AZ	L 26–29	69,986	
November 5	at California		California Memorial Stadium; Berkeley, CA	L 24–26	36,918	
November 12	Oregon State		Sun Devil Stadium; Tempe, AZ	W 38–3	65,058	
November 19	San Jose State*		Sun Devil Stadium; Tempe, AZ	W 24–17	66,285	
November 26	Arizona		Sun Devil Stadium; Tempe, AZ (rivalry)	L 15–17	70,033	
*Non-conference game; Rankings from AP Poll released prior to the game

== Personnel ==
1983 Arizona State Sun Devils football team roster
Players
Coaches
Offense

Pos.	#	Name	Class
QB	1	Todd Hons	Sr
OL		Jim Warne	Fr

Defense

Pos.	#	Name	Class

Special teams

Pos.	#	Name	Class
K		Luis Zendejas	Jr

Head coach

- Darryl Rogers

Coordinators/assistant coaches

- Al Luginbill – Defensive coordinator
- Mike Martz – Quarterbacks

Legend

- (C) Team captain
- (S) Suspended
- (I) Ineligible
- Injured
- Redshirt
