= 1983 UCLA Bruins football team =

American college football season

1983 UCLA Bruins football

Pac-10 champion Rose Bowl champion

Rose Bowl, W 45–9 vs. Illinois
- Conference: Pacific-10 Conference

Ranking
- Coaches: No. 13
- AP: No. 17
- Record: 7–4–1 (6–1–1 Pac-10)
- Head coach: Terry Donahue (8th season)
- Offensive coordinator: Homer Smith (6th season)
- Co-defensive coordinators: Bob Field (2nd season); Tom Hayes (2nd season)
- Home stadium: Rose Bowl

1983 Pacific-10 Conference football standings
	Conf.					Overall
Team	W		L		T	W		L		T
No. 17 UCLA $	6	–	1	–	1	7	–	4	–	1
Washington	5	–	2	–	0	8	–	4	–	0
Washington State	5	–	3	–	0	7	–	4	–	0
USC	4	–	3	–	0	4	–	6	–	1
Arizona	4	–	3	–	1	7	–	3	–	1
Arizona State	3	–	3	–	1	6	–	4	–	1
Oregon	3	–	3	–	1	4	–	6	–	1
California	3	–	4	–	1	5	–	5	–	1
Oregon State	1	–	6	–	1	3	–	7	–	1
Stanford	1	–	7	–	0	1	–	10	–	0
$ – Conference champion; Rankings from AP Poll

The 1983 UCLA Bruins football team was an American football team that represented the University of California, Los Angeles during the 1983 NCAA Division I-A football season. In their eighth year under head coach Terry Donahue, the Bruins compiled a 6–4–1 record (6–1–1 Pac-10) in the regular season and were Pacific-10 Conference champions. On January 2nd, unranked UCLA upset #4 Illinois 45–9 in the 1984 Rose Bowl to finish at 7–4–1 and climbed to seventeenth in the final AP poll. The Bruins began the season winless through four games at 0–3–1, then won seven of eight.

UCLA's offensive leaders in 1983 were quarterback Rick Neuheisel with 2,245 passing yards, running back Kevin Nelson with 898 rushing yards, and wide receiver Mike Sherrard with 709 receiving yards. Neuheisel was selected as the 1984 Rose Bowl Most Valuable Player.

== Schedule ==
Date	Opponent	Rank	Site	TV	Result	Attendance	Source
September 3	at No. 15 Georgia*	No. 20	Sanford Stadium; Athens, GA	ABC	L 8–19	82,122	
September 17	Arizona State		Rose Bowl; Pasadena, CA	CBS	T 26–26	47,093	
September 24	at No. 1 Nebraska*		Memorial Stadium; Lincoln, NE		L 10–42	76,510	
October 1	BYU*		Rose Bowl; Pasadena, CA	Metro	L 35–37	50,044	
October 8	at Stanford		Stanford Stadium; Stanford, CA (rivalry)		W 39–21	55,804	
October 15	at Washington State		Martin Stadium; Pullman, WA		W 24–14	30,000	
October 22	California		Rose Bowl; Pasadena, CA (rivalry)		W 20–16	58,062	
October 29	No. 11 Washington		Rose Bowl; Pasadena, CA	ABC	W 27–24	60,094	
November 5	at Oregon		Autzen Stadium; Eugene, OR		W 24–13	24,511	
November 12	at Arizona		Arizona Stadium; Tucson, AZ	CBS	L 24–27	42,640	
November 19	at USC		Los Angeles Memorial Coliseum; Los Angeles, CA (Victory Bell)		W 27–17	83,763	
January 2, 1984	vs. No. 4 Illinois*		Rose Bowl; Pasadena, CA (Rose Bowl)	NBC	W 45–9	103,217	
*Non-conference game; Rankings from AP Poll released prior to the game

== Game summaries ==
=== USC ===
Team	1	2	3	4	Total
• UCLA	3	3	7	14	27
USC	0	10	0	7	17

- Date: November 19
- Location: Los Angeles Memorial Coliseum, Los Angeles, CA
- Game attendance: 83,763

Scoring summary
Q1	UCLA	Lee 25 yard field goal	UCLA 3–0
Q2	UCLA	Lee 20 yard field goal	UCLA 6–0
Q2	USC	Spencer 1 yard run (Jordan kick)	USC 7–6
Q2	USC	Jordan 30 yard field goal	USC 10–6
Q3	UCLA	Dorrell 7 yard pass from Neuhiesel (Lee kick)	UCLA 13–10
Q4	UCLA	Nelson 12 yard run (Lee kick)	UCLA 20–10
Q4	UCLA	Wiley 17 yard run (Lee kick)	UCLA 27–10
Q4	USC	Spencer 7 yard run (Jordan kick)	UCLA 27–17

== 1984 NFL draft ==
The following players were drafted into professional football following the season.

Player	Position	Round	Pick	Franchise
Don Rogers	Defensive back	1	18	Cleveland Browns
Jay Schroeder	Quarterback	3	83	Washington Redskins
