= 1983 USC Trojans football team =

American college football season

1983 USC Trojans football
- Conference: Pacific-10 Conference
- Record: 4–6–1 (4–3 Pac-10)
- Head coach: Ted Tollner (1st season)
- Captains: Tony Brewer; Jeff Brown; Keith Browner; Fred Cornwell; Tony Slaton
- Home stadium: Los Angeles Memorial Coliseum

1983 Pacific-10 Conference football standings
	Conf.					Overall
Team	W		L		T	W		L		T
No. 17 UCLA $	6	–	1	–	1	7	–	4	–	1
Washington	5	–	2	–	0	8	–	4	–	0
Washington State	5	–	3	–	0	7	–	4	–	0
USC	4	–	3	–	0	4	–	6	–	1
Arizona	4	–	3	–	1	7	–	3	–	1
Arizona State	3	–	3	–	1	6	–	4	–	1
Oregon	3	–	3	–	1	4	–	6	–	1
California	3	–	4	–	1	5	–	5	–	1
Oregon State	1	–	6	–	1	3	–	7	–	1
Stanford	1	–	7	–	0	1	–	10	–	0
$ – Conference champion; Rankings from AP Poll

The 1983 USC Trojans football team represented the University of Southern California (USC) in the 1983 NCAA Division I-A football season. In their first year under head coach Ted Tollner, the Trojans compiled a 4–6–1 record (5–2 against conference opponents), finished in fourth place in the Pacific-10 Conference (Pac-10), and were outscored by their opponents by a combined total of 238 to 210.

Quarterback Sean Salisbury led the team in passing, completing 142 of 248 passes for 1,882 yards with ten touchdowns and nine interceptions. Michael Harper led the team in rushing with 151 carries for 685 yards and six touchdowns. Timmie Ware led the team in receiving yards with 23 catches for 481 yards and five touchdowns.

== Schedule ==
Date	Time	Opponent	Rank	Site	Result	Attendance	Source
September 10	1:30 pm	No. 18 Florida*	No. 9	Los Angeles Memorial Coliseum; Los Angeles, CA	T 19–19	53,948	
September 17	6:00 pm	at Oregon State	No. 14	Parker Stadium; Corvallis, OR	W 33–10	28,000	
September 24	1:30 pm	Kansas*	No. 10	Los Angeles Memorial Coliseum; Los Angeles, CA	L 20–26	49,255	
October 1	4:00 pm	at South Carolina*		Williams–Brice Stadium; Columbia, SC	L 14–38	74,200	
October 8	1:30 pm	Washington State		Los Angeles Memorial Coliseum; Los Angeles. CA	W 38–17	43,106	
October 15	1:30 pm	No. 18 Arizona State^{†}		Los Angeles Memorial Coliseum; Los Angeles, CA	L 14–34	58,664	
October 22	11:30 am	at Notre Dame*		Notre Dame Stadium; Notre Dame, IN (rivalry)	L 6–27	59,075	
October 29	1:00 pm	at California		California Memorial Stadium; Berkeley, CA	W 19–9	65,867	
November 5	1:30 pm	Stanford		Los Angeles Memorial Coliseum; Los Angeles, CA (rivalry)	W 30–7	50,867	
November 12	1:00 pm	at No. 18 Washington		Husky Stadium; Seattle, WA	L 0–24	60,690	
November 19	1:30 pm	UCLA		Los Angeles Memorial Coliseum; Los Angeles. CA (Victory Bell)	L 17–27	83,763	
*Non-conference game; ^{†}Homecoming; Rankings from AP Poll released prior to the game; All times are in Pacific time
