= Mark Walczak =

American football player (born 1962)

No. 87, 83, 89, 81, 88, 86
- Position: Tight end

Personal information
- Born: April 26, 1962 (age 64); Rochester, New York, U.S.
- Listed height: 6 ft 6 in (1.98 m)
- Listed weight: 265 lb (120 kg)

Career information
- High school: Greece Athena
- College: Arizona
- NFL draft: 1986: undrafted

Career history
- Kansas City Chiefs (1986)*; Indianapolis Colts (1987)*; Buffalo Bills (1987); Indianapolis Colts (1987); San Diego Chargers (1988)*; Phoenix Cardinals (1988); San Diego Chargers (1989–1991); Pittsburgh Steelers (1995)*; Memphis Mad Dogs (1995)
- * Offseason or practice squad member only
- Stats at Pro Football Reference

Mark Walczak (April 26, 1962) is an American former professional football player. He played tight end and long snapper for five National Football League (NFL) seasons for the Indianapolis Colts, Buffalo Bills, Phoenix Cardinals, San Diego Chargers, and Pittsburgh Steelers. He played in the Canadian Football League (CFL) for the Memphis Mad Dogs in 1995.
