= Lamonte Hunley =

American football player (born 1963)

No. 56
- Position: Linebacker

Personal information
- Born: January 31, 1963 (age 63); Richmond, Virginia, U.S.
- Listed height: 6 ft 2 in (1.88 m)
- Listed weight: 240 lb (109 kg)

Career information
- High school: Petersburg (VA)
- College: Arizona
- NFL draft: 1985: undrafted

Career history
- Indianapolis Colts (1985–1986); Miami Dolphins (1988)*
- * Offseason or practice squad member only

Awards and highlights
- First-team All-Pac-10 (1984)

Career NFL statistics
- Fumble recoveries: 1
- Stats at Pro Football Reference

Lamonte Hunley (born January 31, 1963) is an American former professional football player who was a linebacker for the Indianapolis Colts of the National Football League (NFL) from 1985 to 1986.

He played college football for the Arizona Wildcats, whose teammates included his older brother, Ricky. Prior to his senior season, Hunley was moved from weakside inside linebacker to strongside inside linebacker, following in his brother's footsteps. Hunley earned first-team All-Pac-10 Conference honors in his new role.

After going undrafted in the 1985 NFL draft, Hunley signed a free agent contract with the Indianapolis Colts. As a rookie, he recorded 25 special teams tackles, which ranked second on the team. Hunley earned playing time at right inside linebacker in 1986 after the team's leading tackler, Barry Krauss, suffered a season-ending against the New York Jets. Hunley recorded five solo tackles, one assisted tackle, and one fumble recovery in the game. However, he suffered a foot injury a few weeks later and was placed on the injured reserve list.

After his playing career, Hunley became a co-owner of Arizona Health, a fitness equipment store, along with partner Scott Thompson.
