= Joe Avezzano =

American football player and coach (1943–2012)

Biographical details
- Born: November 17, 1943; Yonkers, New York, U.S.
- Died: April 5, 2012 (aged 68); Milan, Italy

Playing career
- 1962–1965: Florida State
- 1966: Boston Patriots
- Position: Center

Coaching career (HC unless noted)
- 1967: Washington HS (OH) (assistant)
- 1968: Florida State (GA)
- 1969–1972: Iowa State (assistant)
- 1973–1976: Pittsburgh (OL)
- 1977–1979: Tennessee (OC)
- 1980–1984: Oregon State
- 1985–1988: Texas A&M (OL)
- 1990–2002: Dallas Cowboys (ST)
- 2002–2003: Dallas Desperados
- 2003–2005: Oakland Raiders (ST)
- 2011–2012: Seamen Milano

Head coaching record
- Overall: 6–47–2 (college); 17–13 (AFL)

Accomplishments and honors

Awards
- 3× NFL Special Teams Coach of the Year (1991, 1993, 1998)

Joseph William Avezzano (November 17, 1943 – April 5, 2012) was an American football player and coach. He was the head football coach at Oregon State University from 1980 to 1984, compiling a record of 6–47–2. Avezzano was later an assistant coach with the Dallas Cowboys and Oakland Raiders of the National Football League (NFL). He also was head coach of the Seamen Milano in the Italian Football League (IFL).

== Early life ==
Avezzano attended Miami Jackson High School and graduated in 1961. He accepted a football scholarship from Florida State University, where he was a center.

He was selected by the Boston Patriots in the 6th round (47th overall) of the 1966 American Football League draft. He wore #50 and played in three regular season games before being waived. In 1967, he was signed by the Pittsburgh Steelers and was released before the start of the season.

== Coaching career ==
Avezzano began his coaching career at Washington High School in Massillon, Ohio, and then coached at Florida State, his alma mater, in 1968 and at Iowa State University from 1969 to 1972 under head coach Johnny Majors.

He followed Majors to the University of Pittsburgh, where he was offensive line coach from 1973 to 1976, helping the 1976 Panthers to the national championship. Avezzano went with Majors to the University of Tennessee in 1977, where he was the offensive coordinator for three seasons.

=== Oregon State ===
In December 1979, Avezanno was hired as a head coach for the first time at Oregon State University in the Pacific-10 Conference. He succeeded Craig Fertig and signed a four-year contract at $40,000 per year.

Avezzano's time with the Beavers was less than successful; he had two 14-game losing streaks, separated only by a 31–28 come-from-behind win over Fresno State in 1981 (at the time the greatest comeback in NCAA history, giving him his first victory at OSU) which followed a 0–11 campaign in 1980. In his five years as head coach, Avezzano posted a record of 6–47–2 (.127); he was fired after the 1984 season.

=== Texas A&M ===
Avezzano's next job was the offensive line coach at Texas A&M from 1985 to 1988 under head coach Jackie Sherrill, during which time the Aggies won three Southwest Conference titles and two Cotton Bowls. He also served as offensive coordinator for Texas A&M in 1988.

=== Dallas Cowboys ===
In 1990, Avezzano was hired by Jimmy Johnson to be the special teams coach for the Dallas Cowboys.

He was honored by his NFL special teams coaching peers for the first time in 1991, being named Special Teams Coach of the Year, when the Cowboys:

- Led the NFC in special teams effectiveness and ranked second in the NFL behind the Oakland Raiders.
- Led the league in special teams touchdowns (3) and average kickoff return (21.7 yards).
- Placed a player in the top three in both punt and kickoff return averages in the same season for the first time in team history. In addition, Alexander Wright's 102 yard kickoff return against the Atlanta Falcons and Kelvin Martin's 85 yard punt return against the Philadelphia Eagles were NFL season-bests.
- Kicker Ken Willis tied a club record with 27 field goals and set another with four 50-yarders.
- Punter Mike Saxon finished tied for fourth in the NFL with a career best 36.8 yard net average.
- Blocked three punts, returning one for a touchdown against the Houston Oilers.
- Recovered an onside kick against the Washington Redskins, forced a safety and recovered two punts fumbled by opponents.

Avezzano won his second NFL Special Teams Coach of the Year award in 1993 when his units helped the Cowboys finish as the only team in the NFL to rank in the Top 10 in the league in all four major kicking game categories.

In 1998, the Cowboys were one of only two teams in the NFL to be ranked in the top 12 in all four major kicking game categories, including leading the league in kickoff coverage (18.5), earning Avezzano his third Special Teams Coach of the Year award.

After the firing of Chan Gailey in 2000, he was considered as one of the candidates to take over the head coaching duties of the Dallas Cowboys, which eventually went to Dave Campo. In 2002, Avezzano served as both the special teams coach of the Cowboys and as the head coach of the Dallas Desperados of the Arena Football League.

Avezzano was not retained by the Cowboys when Bill Parcells became head coach in 2003.

=== Dallas Desperados (AFL) ===
While still working for the Dallas Cowboys, he was named the head coach of the inaugural Dallas Desperados team, also owned by Jerry Jones. He remained in that capacity until resigning before the 2004 season, after he accepted an assistant job with the Oakland Raiders. He posted a record of 17–13, and guided the club to two post-season appearances and a division title in the franchise's first two years of existence

=== Oakland Raiders ===
Avezzano was hired by Norv Turner as the special teams coach for the Oakland Raiders in 2003. He and Turner coached together with the Cowboys from 1991 to 1993 where they helped Dallas win back-to-back Super Bowls following the 1992 and 1993 seasons. He coached with the Raiders until Turner's dismissal in 2005.

=== Seamen Milano (IFL) ===
In September 2011, Avezzano was announced as the new head coach of the Seamen Milano of the Italian Football League.

=== Accomplishments ===
Avezzano is the only three-time winner of the NFL Special Teams Coach of the Year award voted on by NFL special teams coaches. His units consistently finished near the top of league rankings in all four major kicking game categories—punt return average, kickoff return average, punt coverage and kickoff coverage—while having a penchant for making big plays, blocking 23 kicks and returning 18 punts and kickoffs for touchdowns.

== Personal life ==
Avezzano was a member of Delta Tau Delta fraternity. He was the owner of "Coach Joe's" bar and grill in Frisco, Texas. The restaurant opened in 2007, directly next door to "Randy White's Hall of Fame BBQ" owned by former Dallas Cowboy Randy White. Hat Tricks was another one of Avezzano's establishments, located in Lewisville, Texas.

He also owned the Corpus Christi Sharks of the Arena Football League 2 (AF2) from 2006 to 2009.

Avezzano was married twice, first to fellow Florida State student, Sherry Butcher from 1965 to 1970, then to Diann Avezzano for over 30 years. He and Diann had one son, Tony.

== Death ==
Avezzano died of a heart attack while exercising on a treadmill in Italy.

== Head coaching record ==
=== College ===
Year	Team	Overall	Conference	Standing	Bowl/playoffs
Oregon State Beavers (Pacific-10 Conference) (1980–1984)
1980	Oregon State	0–11	0–8	10th	
1981	Oregon State	1–10	0–7	10th	
1982	Oregon State	1–9–1	0–7–1	10th	
1983	Oregon State	2–8–1	1–6–1	9th	
1984	Oregon State	2–9	1–7	9th	
Oregon State:		6–47–2	2–35–2		
Total:		6–47–2			

== See also ==
- List of American Football League players
