= 1983 Washington State Cougars football team =

American college football season

1983 Washington State Cougars football
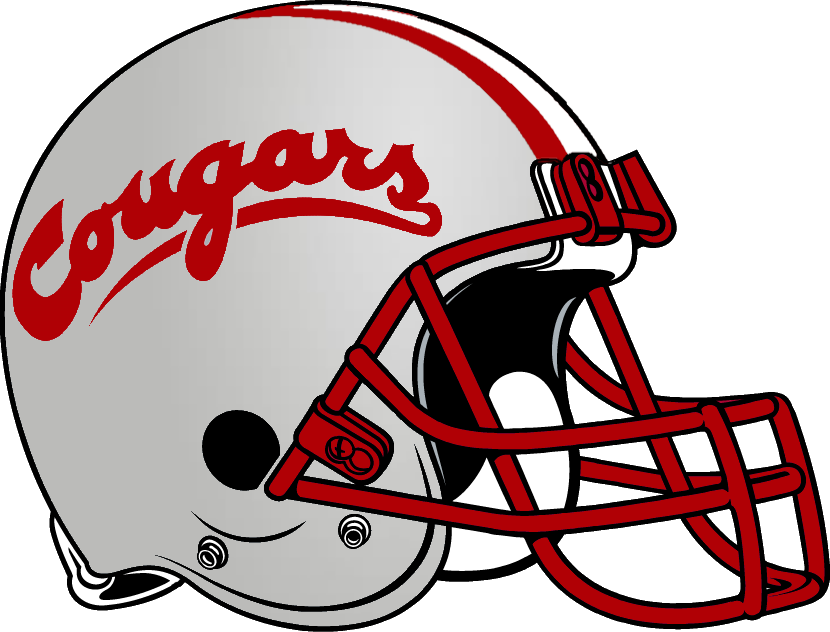
- Conference: Pacific-10 Conference
- Record: 7–4 (5–3 Pac-10)
- Head coach: Jim Walden (6th season)
- Home stadium: Martin Stadium; Joe Albi Stadium

1983 Pacific-10 Conference football standings
	Conf.					Overall
Team	W		L		T	W		L		T
No. 17 UCLA $	6	–	1	–	1	7	–	4	–	1
Washington	5	–	2	–	0	8	–	4	–	0
Washington State	5	–	3	–	0	7	–	4	–	0
USC	4	–	3	–	0	4	–	6	–	1
Arizona	4	–	3	–	1	7	–	3	–	1
Arizona State	3	–	3	–	1	6	–	4	–	1
Oregon	3	–	3	–	1	4	–	6	–	1
California	3	–	4	–	1	5	–	5	–	1
Oregon State	1	–	6	–	1	3	–	7	–	1
Stanford	1	–	7	–	0	1	–	10	–	0
$ – Conference champion; Rankings from AP Poll

The 1983 Washington State Cougars football team represented Washington State University in the 1983 NCAA Division I-A football season as a member of the Pacific-10 Conference (Pac-10). Led by sixth-year head coach Jim Walden, WSU was 7–4 overall (5–3 in Pac-10, third), and played their home games at Joe Albi Stadium in Spokane and at Martin Stadium in Pullman, Washington.

The team's statistical leaders included Ricky Turner with 1,351 passing yards, Kerry Porter with 1,000 rushing yards, and John Marshall with 328 receiving yards. Sophomore quarterback Mark Rypien started two games in September, but was sidelined with a broken collarbone.

The Cougars won a second straight Apple Cup over rival Washington, their first victory at Husky Stadium in Seattle in a decade.

Walden was named the Pac-10 Coach of the Year, and four Cougars were selected to the conference's first team: linemen Keith Millard and Eric Williams on defense, with guard Dan Lynch and sophomore running back Kerry Porter on offense. Millard was the thirteenth overall pick of the 1984 NFL draft, selected by the Minnesota Vikings.

This is the most recent season in which selected home games were played in Spokane, and the Cougars won both. With a change in the academic calendar in 1984, classes started at WSU a month earlier, in late August, and all home games were scheduled for Pullman. (Home games in Seattle at Lumen Field were played from 2002 to 2014.)

== Schedule ==
Date	Opponent	Site	Result	Attendance	Source
September 3	Montana State*	Joe Albi Stadium; Spokane, WA	W 27–7	21,750	
September 10	at No. 6 Michigan*	Michigan Stadium; Ann Arbor, MI	L 17–20	103,256	
September 17	No. 7 Arizona	Martin Stadium; Pullman, WA	L 6–45	25,000	
September 24	UNLV*	Joe Albi Stadium; Spokane, WA	W 41–28	16,500	
October 8	at USC	Los Angeles Memorial Coliseum; Los Angeles, CA	L 17–38	43,106	
October 15	UCLA^{†}	Martin Stadium; Pullman, WA	L 14–24	30,000	
October 22	at No. 13 Arizona State	Sun Devil Stadium; Tempe, AZ	W 31–21	67,516	
October 29	Oregon	Martin Stadium; Pullman, WA	W 24–7	29,500	
November 5	at Oregon State	Parker Stadium; Corvallis, OR	W 27–9	32,500	
November 12	California	Martin Stadium; Pullman, WA	W 16–6	15,000	
November 19	at No. 15 Washington	Husky Stadium; Seattle, WA (Apple Cup)	W 17–6	59,220	
*Non-conference game; ^{†}Homecoming; Rankings from AP Poll released prior to the game

== Coaching staff ==
- Head coach: Jim Walden
- Assistants: Jim Burrow, Dave Elliott, Jon Fabris, Gary Gagnon, Lindsay Hughes, Steve Morton, Mel Sanders, Del Wight, Ken Woody

== Game summaries ==
=== Oregon ===
Team	1	2	3	4	Total
Oregon	0	0	7	0	7
• Washington State	7	0	17	0	24

- Date:
  October 29
- Location: Martin Stadium, Pullman, Washington
- Game attendance: 29,500

Scoring summary
1	0:33	WSU	Taylor 78-yard punt return (Trout kick)	WSU 7–0
3	11:12	WSU	Turner 32-yard run (Trout kick)	WSU 14–0
3	10:55	WSU	Turner 24-yard run (Trout kick)	WSU 21–0
3	6:30	WSU	Trout 44-yard field goal	WSU 24–0
3	2:58	ORE	Barnes 8-yard pass from Owens (Schwabe kick)	WSU 24–7

== Roster ==
1983 Washington State Cougars football team roster
Players
Coaches
Offense

Pos.	#	Name	Class
QB	10	Ed Blount	Fr
SE	80	John Breland	Jr
RB	22	Richard Calvin	Fr
OT	77	Mike Dreyer	Jr
OT	60	Charlie Flager	Sr
FB	21	Don LaBomme	Sr
C	61	Curt Ladines	So
TE	92	Vince Leighton	Jr
G	58	Dan Lynch	Sr
SE	18	John Marshall	Jr
RB	36	Rueben Mayes	So
G	50	Mike Palumbo	Jr
FB	30	Kerry Porter	So
QB	17	Mark Rypien	So
OT	67	Mike Schuster	So
QB	12	Ricky Turner	Sr
C	55	Pili Tutuvanu	Jr
OT	74	John Winslow	Sr

Defense

Pos.	#	Name	Class
CB	22	Tracy Adkins	Sr
LB	96	Lee Blakeney	Jr
LB	97	Mike Beasley	Jr
CB	16	Cedric Brown	So
LB	91	Ben Carrillo	Jr
CB	44	Erwin Chappel	Fr
LB	37	Sonny Elkinton	Sr
FS	28	Steve Haub	Sr
NG	79	Milford Hodge	Jr
LB	51	James Krakoski	Fr
NG	65	Pat Lynch	Sr
DT	93	Keith Millard	Sr
SS	3	Joe Taylor	Sr
LB	98	Rico Tipton	Jr
FS	2	Jerald Waters	Jr
DT	76	Eric Williams	Sr

Special teams

Pos.	#	Name	Class
P	1	Glenn Harper	So
K	4	John Traut	So

Head coach

- Jim Walden (6th year)

Coordinators/assistant coaches

Legend

- (C) Team captain
- (S) Suspended
- (I) Ineligible
- Injured
- Redshirt

== NFL draft ==
Three Cougars were selected in the 1984 NFL draft.

Player	Position	Round	Overall	Franchise
Keith Millard	DT	1	13	Minnesota Vikings
Eric Williams	DT	3	62	Detroit Lions
Charlie Flager	G	11	292	New England Patriots
