= 1983 Wisconsin Badgers football team =

American college football season

1983 Wisconsin Badgers football
- Conference: Big Ten Conference
- Record: 7–4 (5–4 Big Ten)
- Head coach: Dave McClain (6th season)
- Offensive coordinator: Bill Dudley (4th season)
- Offensive scheme: Pro-style
- Defensive coordinator: Jim Hilles (6th season)
- Base defense: 3–4
- MVP: Al Toon
- Captains: Mike Herrington; Brian Marrow; Randy Wright
- Home stadium: Camp Randall Stadium

1983 Big Ten Conference football standings
| | Conf. | | | | | Overall |
| Team | W | | L | | T | W | | L | | T |
|---|---|---|---|---|---|---|---|---|---|---|
| No. 10 Illinois $ | 9 | – | 0 | – | 0 | 10 | – | 2 | – | 0 |
| No. 8 Michigan | 8 | – | 1 | – | 0 | 9 | – | 3 | – | 0 |
| No. 14 Iowa | 7 | – | 2 | – | 0 | 9 | – | 3 | – | 0 |
| No. 9 Ohio State | 6 | – | 3 | – | 0 | 9 | – | 3 | – | 0 |
| Wisconsin | 5 | – | 4 | – | 0 | 7 | – | 4 | – | 0 |
| Purdue | 3 | – | 5 | – | 1 | 3 | – | 7 | – | 1 |
| Michigan State | 2 | – | 6 | – | 1 | 4 | – | 6 | – | 1 |
| Indiana | 2 | – | 7 | – | 0 | 3 | – | 8 | – | 0 |
| Northwestern | 2 | – | 7 | – | 0 | 2 | – | 9 | – | 0 |
| Minnesota | 0 | – | 9 | – | 0 | 1 | – | 10 | – | 0 |
$ – Conference champion; Rankings from AP Poll

The 1983 Wisconsin Badgers football team represented the University of Wisconsin–Madison in the 1983 Big Ten Conference football season. Led by sixth-year head coach Dave McClain, the Badgers compiled an overall record of 7–4 with a mark of 5–4 in conference play, placing fifth in the Big Ten. Wisconsin played home games at Camp Randall Stadium in Madison, Wisconsin.

== Schedule ==
| Date | Opponent | Site | Result | Attendance | Source |
|---|---|---|---|---|---|
| September 10 | Northern Illinois* | Camp Randall Stadium; Madison, WI | W 37–9 | 56,941 | |
| September 17 | Missouri* | Camp Randall Stadium; Madison, WI | W 21–20 | 65,044 | |
| September 24 | No. 17 Michigan | Camp Randall Stadium; Madison, WI | L 21–38 | 77,708 | |
| October 1 | at Northwestern | Dyche Stadium; Evanston, IL | W 49–0 | 32,180 | |
| October 8 | No. 19 Illinois | Camp Randall Stadium; Madison, WI | L 15–27 | 78,307 | |
| October 15 | at Minnesota | Hubert H. Humphrey Metrodome; Minneapolis, MN (rivalry) | W 56–17 | 62,689 | |
| October 22 | Indiana^{†} | Camp Randall Stadium; Madison, WI | W 45–14 | 78,199 | |
| October 29 | at No. 16 Ohio State | Ohio Stadium; Columbus, OH | L 27–45 | 89,203 | |
| November 5 | No. 15 Iowa | Camp Randall Stadium; Madison, WI (rivalry) | L 14–34 | 78,105 | |
| November 12 | at Purdue | Ross–Ade Stadium; West Lafayette, IN | W 42–38 | 58,342 | |
| November 19 | Michigan State | Camp Randall Stadium; Madison, WI | W 32–0 | 54,204 | |
*Non-conference game; ^{†}Homecoming; Rankings from AP Poll released prior to the game

== Game summaries ==
=== Michigan ===
Week 3: Michigan at Wisconsin

| Team | 1 | 2 | 3 | 4 | Total |
|---|---|---|---|---|---|
| • Michigan | 7 | 15 | 10 | 6 | 38 |
| Wisconsin | 7 | 0 | 0 | 14 | 21 |

- Date: September 24
- Location: Madison, WI
- Game attendance: 77,708

Scoring summary
| 1 | 11:41 | WIS | Gary Ellerson 9-yard run (Rohde kick) | WIS 7–0 |
| 1 | 1:50 | MICH | Rick Rogers 2-yard run (Todd Schlopy kick) | TIE 7–7 |
| 2 | | MICH | Rogers 9-yard run (kick failed) | MICH 13–7 |
| 2 | | MICH | Bob Bergeron 41-yard field goal | MICH 16–7 |
| 2 | 1:13 | MICH | Sim Nelson 7-yard pass from Steve Smith (Smith run failed) | MICH 22–7 |
| 3 | 6:53 | MICH | Bergeron 37-yard field goal | MICH 25–7 |
| 3 | | MICH | Dan Rice 5-yard run (Bergeron kick) | MICH 32–7 |
| 4 | 12:17 | WIS | Marck Harrison 2-yard pass from Randy Wright (Rohde kick) | MICH 32–14 |
| 4 | 7:35 | WIS | Mike Jones 32-yard pass from Wright (Rohde kick) | MICH 32–21 |
| 4 | | MICH | Brian Mercer 11-yard run (kick by Bergeron blocked) | MICH 38–21 |

On September 24, 1983, Wisconsin lost to Michigan, 38–21, before a crowd of 77,708 at Camp Randall Stadium in Madison, Wisconsin.

=== At Northwestern ===
| Team | 1 | 2 | 3 | 4 | Total |
|---|---|---|---|---|---|
| • Wisconsin | 7 | 14 | 14 | 14 | 49 |
| Northwestern | 0 | 0 | 0 | 0 | 0 |

- Date: October 1
- Location: Dyche Stadium, Evanston, IL

Scoring summary
| 1 | WIS | Harrison 1-yard run (Rohde kick) | WIS 7-0 |
| 2 | WIS | Ellerson 8-yard run (Rohde kick) | WIS 14-0 |
| 2 | WIS | McFadden 22-yard pass from Wright (Rohde kick) | WIS 21-0 |
| 3 | WIS | Armentrout 58-yard run (Rohde kick) | WIS 28-0 |
| 3 | WIS | Toon 7-yard pass from Wright (Rohde kick) | WIS 35-0 |
| 4 | WIS | Armentrout 7-yard run (Rohde kick) | WIS 42-0 |
| 4 | WIS | Emery 15-yard run (Rohde kick) | WIS 49-0 |

=== At Ohio State ===
Wisconsin Badgers (5–2) at #16 Ohio State Buckeyes (5–2)

| Quarter | 1 | 2 | 3 | 4 | Total |
|---|---|---|---|---|---|
| Wisconsin | 14 | 7 | 6 | 0 | 27 |
| Ohio St | 7 | 21 | 10 | 7 | 45 |

at Ohio Stadium, Columbus, Ohio

- Date: October 29, 1983
- Game time: 1:30 p.m. EDT
- Game weather: Clear, 55 °F (13 °C)
- Game attendance: 89,203
- Referee: Jim Kemerling
- Box Score

Game information

First quarter

- WIS – Gary Ellerson 2-yard run (Kevin Rohde kick), 11:34. Wisconsin 7–0.
- OSU – Thad Jemison 19-yard pass from Mike Tomczak (Rich Spangler kick), 5:25. Tie 7–7.
- WIS – Thad McFadden 20-yard pass from Randy Wright (Kevin Rohde kick), 2:50. Wisconsin 14–7.

Second quarter

- OSU – Mike Tomczak 28-yard run (Rich Spangler kick), 13:19. Tie 14–14.
- OSU – Keith Byars 13-yard run (Rich Spangler kick), 7:16. Ohio St 21–14.
- OSU – Vaughn Broadnax 1-yard run (Rich Spangler kick), 2:07. Ohio St 28–14.
- WIS – Nick Toon 22-yard pass from Randy Wright (Kevin Rohde kick), 0:57. Ohio St 28–21.

Third quarter

- WIS – Brett Pearson 7-yard pass from Randy Wright (kick failed), 11:36. Ohio St 28–27.
- OSU – Rich Spangler 36-yard field goal, 4:41. Ohio St 31–27.
- OSU – Keith Byars 3-yard run (Rich Spangler kick), 1:36. Ohio St 38–27.

Fourth quarter

- OSU – Roman Bates 14-yard run (Rich Spangler kick), 12:48. Ohio St 45–27.

Top passers

- WIS – Randy Wright – 23/39, 319 yards, 3 TD, 4 INT
- OSU – Mike Tomczak – 12/14, 162 yards, TD

Top rushers

- WIS – Joe Armentrout – 10 rushes, 40 yards
- OSU – Keith Byars – 29 rushes, 174 yards, 2 TD

Top receivers

- WIS – Thad McFadden – 3 receptions, 108 yards, TD
- OSU – Cedric Anderson – 4 receptions, 70 yards

External videos
- Game highlights

=== At Purdue ===
Wisconsin Badgers (5–4) at Purdue Boilermakers (2–6–1)

| Quarter | 1 | 2 | 3 | 4 | Total |
|---|---|---|---|---|---|
| Wisconsin | 7 | 14 | 7 | 14 | 42 |
| Purdue | 3 | 20 | 0 | 15 | 38 |

at Ross–Ade Stadium, West Lafayette, Indiana

- Date: November 12, 1983
- Game attendance: 58,342

Game information

First quarter

- WIS – Gary Ellerson 2-yard run (Kevin Rodhe kick). Wisconsin 7–0.
- PUR – Tim Clark 20-yard field goal. Wisconsin 7–3.

Second quarter

- WIS – Randy Wright 1-yard run (Kevin Rohde kick). Wisconsin 14–3.
- PUR – Cliff Benson 18-yard pass from Scott Campbell (Tim Clark kick). Wisconsin 14–10.
- PUR – Cliff Benson 1-yard pass from Scott Campbell (Tim Clark kick). Purdue 17–14.
- WIS – Al Toon 73-yard pass from Randy Wright (Kevin Rohde kick). Wisconsin 21–17.
- PUR – Lloyd Hawthorne 1-yard run (kick failed). Purdue 23–21.

Third quarter

- WIS – Randy Wright 2-yard run (Kevin Rohde kick). Wisconsin 28–23.

Fourth quarter

- PUR – Bruce King 17-yard run (pass good). Purdue 31–28.
- WIS – Randy Wright 8-yard run (Kevin Rohde kick). Wisconsin 35–31.
- PUR – Lloyd Hawthorne 3-yard run (Tim Clark kick), 2:35. Purdue 38–35.
- WIS – Brett Pearson 13-yard pass from Randy Wright (Kevin Rohde kick), 0:32. Wisconsin 42–35.

Top passers

- WIS – Randy Wright – 16/33, 317 yards, 2 TD, 2 INT
- PUR – Scott Campbell – 17/30, 181 yards, 2 TD, 2 INT

Top rushers

- WIS – Gary Ellerson – 21 rushes, 93 yards, TD
- PUR – Mel Gray – 24 rushes, 106 yards

Top receivers

- WIS – Al Toon – 8 receptions, 252 yards, TD
- PUR – Jeff Price – 3 receptions, 66 yards

External videos
- Game film (no sound)

== Personnel ==
1983 Wisconsin Badgers football team roster
Players
Coaches
Offense

| Pos. | # | Name | Class |
|---|---|---|---|
| FB | 23 | Joe Armentrout | Fr |
| TE | 85 | Dave Arneson | Jr |
| OT | 75 | Kevin Belcher | Jr |
| FB | 31 | Brian Bonner | Fr |
| FB | 32 | Kemal Carr | Jr |
| OT | 72 | Jeff Dellenbach | Jr |
| RB | 41 | Gary Ellerson | Jr |
| RB | 24 | Larry Emery | Fr |
| WR | 47 | Steve Fritz | Sr |
| C | 54 | David Gaatz | Jr |
| FB | 34 | Marck Harrison | Jr |
| QB | 7 | Mike Howard | Fr |
| WR | 4 | Michael Jones | Jr |
| QB | 10 | Bob Kobza | Sr |
| G | 66 | Bob Landsee | So |
| C | 69 | Jim Lick | Sr |
| WR | 20 | Thad McFadden | Jr |
| OT | 67 | David Mielke | Jr |
| TE | 88 | Jeff Nault | Jr |
| WR | 22 | Marvin Neal | Sr |
| G | 78 | Chris Osswald | Jr |
| TE | 86 | Bret Pearson | Jr |
| G | 57 | Bill Schick | So |
| RB | 44 | Bobby Taylor | Fr |
| WR | 87 | Al Toon | Jr |
| C | 51 | Dan Turk | Jr |
| QB | 12 | Randy Wright (C) | Sr |

Defense

| Pos. | # | Name | Class |
|---|---|---|---|
| S | 17 | Richard Baxter | So |
| S | 37 | Russ Bellford | Sr |
| DT | 92 | Scott Bergold | Jr |
| DT | 63 | Michael Boykins | Fr |
| NT | 68 | Lance Branaman | Fr |
| LB | 55 | Russ Fields | Jr |
| LB | 96 | Brad Grabow | Jr |
| LB | 99 | Rick Graf | Fr |
| LB | 64 | Mike Herrington (C) | Sr |
| CB | 29 | Richard Johnson | Jr |
| LB | 95 | Tim Jordan (injured) | So |
| LB | 39 | Joe Kelich | Sr |
| DT | 54 | Jim Kmet | Fr |
| CB | 15 | Brian Marrow (C) | Sr |
| LB | 33 | James Melka | Jr |
| NT | 89 | Brad Pierce | Jr |
| LB | 28 | Art Price | Jr |
| LB | 53 | Craig Raddatz | Fr |
| LB | 52 | Michael Reid | Fr |
| DT | 62 | Kurt Schlicht | Fr |
| DT | 60 | Darryl Sims (I) | Jr |
| S | 3 | Ken Stills | Jr |
| S | 2 | Averick Walker | Jr |

Special teams

| Pos. | # | Name | Class |
|---|---|---|---|
| K | 6 | Wendell Gladem | Sr |
| K | 11 | Kevin Rohde | Sr |
| P | 5 | George Winslow | So |

Head coach

- Dave McClain

Coordinators/assistant coaches

- Bill Dudley – Offensive Coordinator/Quarterbacks and Running Backs
- Jim Hilles – Defensive Coordinator/Inside Linebackers
- Dave Anderson – Outside Linebackers
- Chuck Heater – Defensive Backs
- Fred Jackson – Wide Receivers
- Arnold Jeter – Defensive Line
- Ron McBride – Offensive Line Tight Side/Tight Ends
- Mario Russo – Offensive Line Split Side/Special Teams
- Jerry Fishbain – Recruiting Coordinator

Legend

- (C) Team captain
- (S) Suspended
- (I) Ineligible
- Injured
- Redshirt

== 1984 NFL draft ==
| Player | Position | Round | Pick | NFL club |
|---|---|---|---|---|
| Randy Wright | Quarterback | 6 | 153 | Green Bay Packers |
