= 1983 Purdue Boilermakers football team =

American college football season

1983 Purdue Boilermakers football
- Conference: Big Ten Conference
- Record: 3–7–1 (3–5–1 Big Ten)
- Head coach: Leon Burtnett (2nd season)
- Offensive coordinator: Jim Colletto (2nd season)
- Defensive coordinator: Joe Tiller (1st season)
- MVP: Scott Campbell
- Captains: Scott Campbell; Brock Spack
- Home stadium: Ross–Ade Stadium

1983 Big Ten Conference football standings
	Conf.					Overall
Team	W		L		T	W		L		T
No. 10 Illinois $	9	–	0	–	0	10	–	2	–	0
No. 8 Michigan	8	–	1	–	0	9	–	3	–	0
No. 14 Iowa	7	–	2	–	0	9	–	3	–	0
No. 9 Ohio State	6	–	3	–	0	9	–	3	–	0
Wisconsin	5	–	4	–	0	7	–	4	–	0
Purdue	3	–	5	–	1	3	–	7	–	1
Michigan State	2	–	6	–	1	4	–	6	–	1
Indiana	2	–	7	–	0	3	–	8	–	0
Northwestern	2	–	7	–	0	2	–	9	–	0
Minnesota	0	–	9	–	0	1	–	10	–	0
$ – Conference champion; Rankings from AP Poll

The 1983 Purdue Boilermakers football team represented Purdue University during the 1983 NCAA Division I-A football season. Led by second-year head coach Leon Burtnett, the Boilermakers compiled an overall record of 3–7–1 with a mark of 3–5–1 in conference play, placing sixth in the Big Ten. Purdue played home games at Ross–Ade Stadium in West Lafayette, Indiana.

== Schedule ==
Date	Opponent	Site	Result	Attendance	Source
September 10	No. 5 Notre Dame*	Ross–Ade Stadium; West Lafayette, IN (rivalry)	L 6–52	69,782	
September 17	at Miami (FL)*	Miami Orange Bowl; Miami, FL	L 0–35	34,557	
September 24	at Minnesota	Hubert H. Humphrey Metrodome; Minneapolis, MN	W 32–20	41,839	
October 1	Michigan State	Ross–Ade Stadium; West Lafayette, IN	T 29–29	69,203	
October 8	at No. 6 Ohio State	Ohio Stadium; Columbus, OH	L 22–33	89,384	
October 15	at No. 14 Iowa	Kinnick Stadium; Iowa City, IA	L 14–31	66,105	
October 22	No. 11 Illinois^{†}	Ross–Ade Stadium; West Lafayette, IN (rivalry)	L 21–35	69,328	
October 29	Northwestern	Ross–Ade Stadium; West Lafayette, IN	W 48–17	60,134	
November 5	at No. 13 Michigan	Michigan Stadium; Ann Arbor, MI	L 10–42	104,946	
November 12	Wisconsin	Ross–Ade Stadium; West Lafayette, IN	L 38–42	58,342	
November 19	at Indiana	Memorial Stadium; Bloomington, IN (Old Oaken Bucket)	W 31–30	52,038	
*Non-conference game; ^{†}Homecoming; Rankings from AP Poll released prior to the game

== Game summaries ==
=== Michigan State ===
- Scott Campbell 30/50, 300 yards

=== At Ohio State ===
Purdue Boilermakers (1–2–1) at #6 Ohio State Buckeyes (3–1)

Quarter	1	2	3	4	Total
Purdue	7	0	0	15	22
Ohio St	6	6	14	7	33

at Ohio Stadium, Columbus, Ohio

- Date: October 8, 1983
- Game time: 1:30 p.m. EDT
- Game weather: Sunny, 76 °F (24 °C)
- Game attendance: 89,384
- Referee: Tom Quinn
- Box Score

Game information

First quarter

- OSU – Paul Allen 21-yard field goal, 9:41. Ohio St 3–0. Drive: 11 plays, 61 yards, 5:11.
- OSU – Paul Allen 41-yard field goal, 4:30. Ohio St 6–0. Drive: 10 plays, 45 yards, 3:34.
- PUR – Eric Jordan 40-yard run (Tim Clark kick), 2:27. Purdue 7–6. Drive: 6 plays, 71 yards, 2:00.

Second quarter

- OSU – Keith Byars 4-yard run (pass failed), 5:23. Ohio St 12–7. Drive: 3 plays, 20 yards, 0:59.

Third quarter

- OSU – Garcia Lane 63-yard punt return (Rich Spangler kick), 13:43. Ohio St 19–7.
- OSU – Garcia Lane 71-yard punt return (Rich Spangler kick), 2:51. Ohio St 26–7.

Fourth quarter

- PUR – Tim Clark 39-yard field goal, 14:20. Ohio St 26–10. Drive: 10 plays, 58 yards, 3:31.
- OSU – Keith Byars 2-yard run (Rich Spangler kick), 10:56. Ohio St 33–10. Drive: 6 plays, 80 yards, 3:19.
- PUR – Cliff Benson 5-yard pass from Scott Campbell (pass failed), 3:50. Ohio St 33–16. Drive: 11 plays, 56 yards, 3:59.
- PUR – Mel Gray 20-yard run (pass failed), 2:58. Ohio St 33–22. Drive: 4 plays, 48 yards, 0:46.

Top passers

- PUR – Scott Campbell – 23/36, 228 yards, TD
- OSU – Mike Tomczak – 8/17, 145 yards, 2 INT

Top rushers

- PUR – Eric Jordan – 9 rushes, 89 yards, TD
- OSU – Keith Byars – 23 rushes, 135 yards, 2 TD

Top receivers

- PUR – Steve Griffin – 5 receptions, 62 yards
- OSU – Keith Byars – 4 receptions, 120 yards

=== Illinois ===
- Scott Campbell 30/43, 388 yards

=== Wisconsin ===
Wisconsin Badgers (5–4) at Purdue Boilermakers (2–6–1)

Quarter	1	2	3	4	Total
Wisconsin	7	14	7	14	42
Purdue	3	20	0	15	38

at Ross–Ade Stadium, West Lafayette, Indiana

- Date: November 12, 1983
- Game attendance: 58,342

Game information

First quarter

- WIS – Gary Ellerson 2-yard run (Kevin Rodhe kick). Wisconsin 7–0.
- PUR – Tim Clark 20-yard field goal. Wisconsin 7–3.

Second quarter

- WIS – Randy Wright 1-yard run (Kevin Rohde kick). Wisconsin 14–3.
- PUR – Cliff Benson 18-yard pass from Scott Campbell (Tim Clark kick). Wisconsin 14–10.
- PUR – Cliff Benson 1-yard pass from Scott Campbell (Tim Clark kick). Purdue 17–14.
- WIS – Al Toon 73-yard pass from Randy Wright (Kevin Rohde kick). Wisconsin 21–17.
- PUR – Lloyd Hawthorne 1-yard run (kick failed). Purdue 23–21.

Third quarter

- WIS – Randy Wright 2-yard run (Kevin Rohde kick). Wisconsin 28–23.

Fourth quarter

- PUR – Bruce King 17-yard run (pass good). Purdue 31–28.
- WIS – Randy Wright 8-yard run (Kevin Rohde kick). Wisconsin 35–31.
- PUR – Lloyd Hawthorne 3-yard run (Tim Clark kick), 2:35. Purdue 38–35.
- WIS – Brett Pearson 13-yard pass from Randy Wright (Kevin Rohde kick), 0:32. Wisconsin 42–35.

Top passers

- WIS – Randy Wright – 16/33, 317 yards, 2 TD, 2 INT
- PUR – Scott Campbell – 17/30, 181 yards, 2 TD, 2 INT

Top rushers

- WIS – Gary Ellerson – 21 rushes, 93 yards, TD
- PUR – Mel Gray – 24 rushes, 106 yards

Top receivers

- WIS – Al Toon – 8 receptions, 252 yards, TD
- PUR – Jeff Price – 3 receptions, 66 yards

External videos
- Game film (no sound)

=== At Indiana ===
Purdue Boilermakers (2–7–1) at Indiana Hoosiers (3–7)

Quarter	1	2	3	4	Total
Purdue	0	21	3	7	31
Indiana	0	14	0	16	30

at Memorial Stadium, Bloomington, Indiana

- Date: November 19, 1983
- Game attendance: 52,038

Game information

First quarter

- No scoring

Second quarter

- PUR – Mel Gray 1-yard run (Tim Clark kick). Purdue 7–0.
- IU – Orlando Brown 8-yard run (Doug Smith kick). Tie 7–7.
- PUR – Jeff Price 13-yard pass from Scott Campbell (Tim Clark kick). Purdue 14–7.
- PUR – Scott Campbell 1-yard run (Tim Clark kick). Purdue 21–7.
- IU – Len Kenebrew 22-yard pass from Steve Bradley (Doug Smith kick). Purdue 21–14.

Third quarter

- PUR – Tim Clark 34-yard field goal. Purdue 24–14.

Fourth quarter

- IU – Doug Smith 43-yard field goal. Purdue 24–17.
- PUR – Mel Gray 2-yard run (Tim Clark kick). Purdue 31–17.
- IU – Bobby Howard 7-yard run (Doug Smith kick). Purdue 31–24.
- IU – Duane Gunn 45-yard pass from Steve Bradley (pass failed). Purdue 31–30.

Top passers

- PUR – Scott Campbell – 9/16, 102 yards, TD
- IU – Steve Bradley – 16/30, 295 yards, 2 TD, INT

Top rushers

- PUR – Mel Gray – 36 rushes, 176 yards, 2 TD
- IU – Orlando Brown – 16 rushes, 53 yards, TD

Top receivers

- PUR – Cliff Benson – 2 receptions, 40 yards
- IU – Duane Gunn – 5 receptions, 140 yards, TD

External videos
- Game highlights (local news)

== Roster ==
1983 Purdue Boilermakers football team roster
Players
Coaches
Offense

Pos.	#	Name	Class
OL		Butch Alder
OL		Paul Alekna
RB		Tim Alspaugh
TE		Cliff Benson
WR		Rick Brunner
QB	10	Scott Campbell	Sr
RB		Rodney Carter
OL		Mark Drenth
QB	11	Jim Everett	RSo
RB		Jeff Feulner
OL		John Fitzpatrick
RB		Mel Gray	Sr
WR		Steve Griffin
RB		Lloyd Hawthorne
OL		Doug Isbell
WR		Mark Jackson
RB		Eric Jordan
RB	37	Bruce King	Jr
WR		Jeff Price
WR		Dave Retherford
RB		Tim Richardson
TE		Marty Scott
OL		Pat Snyder

Defense

Pos.	#	Name	Class
DB		Don Anderson
DL		Andy Gladstone
DL		Kevin Holley
DL		Brad Hornor
DL		Derrick Hoskins
DL		Jason Houston
DL		Melvin Menke
DL		Chris Scott
LB		Brock Spack
LB		Kevin Sumlin
DB		Ray Wallace
DB		Kennedy Wilson
DL		Derek Wimberly
DB		Rod Woodson
DL		Bob Ziltz

Special teams

Pos.	#	Name	Class
K		Tim Clark
P		Walt Drapeza
K		Andrew Falender
P		Matt Kinzer

Head coach

- Leon Burtnett

Coordinators/assistant coaches

- Bill Doba
- Stan Parrish
- Bob Spoo

Legend

- (C) Team captain
- (S) Suspended
- (I) Ineligible
- Injured
- Redshirt
