= 1983 Big Ten Conference football season =

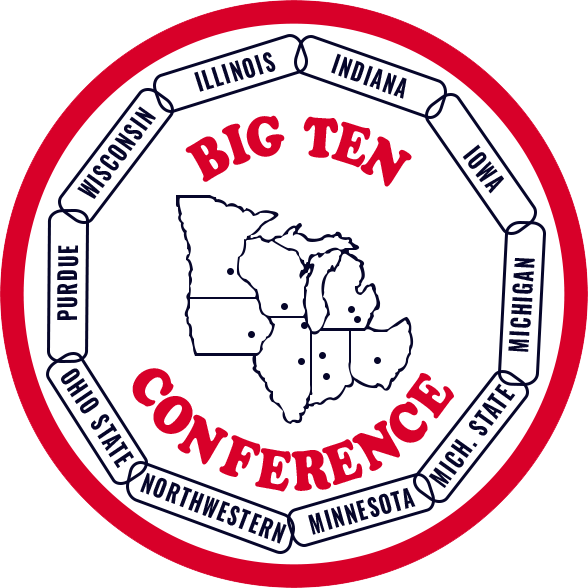
- League: NCAA Division I-A
- Sport: Football
- Teams: 10
- Top draft pick: Carl Banks
- Champion: Illinois
- Runners-up: Ohio State
- Season MVP: Don Thorp
- Top scorer: Keith Byars

Football seasons

1983 Big Ten Conference football standings
	Conf.					Overall
Team	W		L		T	W		L		T
No. 10 Illinois $	9	–	0	–	0	10	–	2	–	0
No. 8 Michigan	8	–	1	–	0	9	–	3	–	0
No. 14 Iowa	7	–	2	–	0	9	–	3	–	0
No. 9 Ohio State	6	–	3	–	0	9	–	3	–	0
Wisconsin	5	–	4	–	0	7	–	4	–	0
Purdue	3	–	5	–	1	3	–	7	–	1
Michigan State	2	–	6	–	1	4	–	6	–	1
Indiana	2	–	7	–	0	3	–	8	–	0
Northwestern	2	–	7	–	0	2	–	9	–	0
Minnesota	0	–	9	–	0	1	–	10	–	0
$ – Conference champion; Rankings from AP Poll

The 1983 Big Ten Conference football season was the 88th season of college football played by the member schools of the Big Ten Conference and was a part of the 1983 NCAA Division I-A football season.

The 1983 Big Ten champion was Illinois. The Illini compiled a 10-2 record (9-0 against Big Ten opponents). They were led quarterback Jack Trudeau with 2,446 passing yards, running back Thomas Rooks with 842 rushing yards, and wide receiver David Williams with 870 receiving yards. The 1983 Illini are the only Big Ten team to go 9-0 in regular season conference play, until Wisconsin went 9-0 in 2017.

== Season overview ==
=== Results and team statistics ===
Conf. Rank	Team	Head coach	AP final	AP high	Overall record	Conf. record	PPG	PAG
1	Illinois	Mike White	#10	#4	10–2	9–0	28.9	17.8
2	Michigan	Bo Schembechler	#8	#6	9–3	8–1	29.6	13.3
3	Iowa	Hayden Fry	#14	#4	9–3	7–2	31.7	15.8
4	Ohio State	Earle Bruce	#9	#3	9–3	6–3	34.2	17.2
5	Wisconsin	Dave McClain	NR	NR	7–4	5–4	32.6	22.0
6	Purdue	Leon Burtnett	NR	NR	3–7–1	3–5–1	22.8	33.3
7	Michigan State	George Perles	NR	NR	4–6–1	2–6–1	14.7	21.2
8 (tie)	Indiana	Sam Wyche	NR	NR	3–8	2–7	18.3	32.7
8 (tie)	Northwestern	Dennis Green	NR	NR	2–9	2–7	9.2	36.2
10	Minnesota	Joe Salem	NR	NR	1–10	0–9	16.5	47.1

Key
AP final = Team's rank in the final AP Poll of the 1983 season
AP high = Team's highest rank in the AP Poll throughout the 1983 season
PPG = Average of points scored per game
PAG = Average of points allowed per game

=== Bowl games ===
Four Big Ten teams played in bowl games as follows:

- Ohio State defeated Pittsburgh, 28-23, in the 1984 Fiesta Bowl in Tempe, Arizona
- Illinois lost to UCLA, 45-9, in the 1984 Rose Bowl in Pasadena, California
- Michigan lost to Auburn, 9-7, in the 1984 Sugar Bowl in New Orleans
- Iowa lost to Florida, 14-6, in the 1983 Gator Bowl in Jacksonville, Florida.

== Statistical leaders ==
The Big Ten's individual statistical leaders include the following:

=== Passing yards ===
1. Jack Trudeau, Illinois (2,446)
2. Chuck Long, Iowa (2,434)
3. Randy Wright, Wisconsin (2,329)
4. Steve Bradley, Indiana (2,298)
5. Scott Campbell, Purdue (2,031)

=== Rushing yards ===
1. Keith Byars, Ohio State (1,199)
2. Rick Rogers, Michigan (1,002)
3. Mel Gray, Purdue (849)
4. Thomas Rooks, Illinois (842)
5. Gary Ellerson, Wisconsin (777)

=== Receiving yards ===
1. Dave Moritz, Iowa (912)
2. Al Toon, Wisconsin (881)
3. David Williams, Illinois (870)
4. Duane Gunn, Indiana (815)
5. Len Kenebrew, Indiana (687)

=== Total offense ===
1. Randy Wright, Wisconsin (2,418)
2. Steve Bradley, Indiana (2,406)
3. Chuck Long, Iowa (2,404)
4. Jack Trudeau, Illinois (2,353)
5. Mike Tomczak, Ohio State (2,192)

=== Passing efficiency rating ===
1. Chuck Long, Iowa (160.4)
2. Jack Trudeau, Illinois (136.4)
3. Mike Tomczak, Ohio State (131.2)
4. Steve Smith, Michigan (123.0)
5. Randy Wright, Wisconsin (122.4)

=== Rushing yards per attempt ===
1. Steve Smith, Michigan (6.5)
2. Eric Jordan, Purdue (6.4)
3. Owen Gill, Iowa (6.0)
4. Keith Byars, Ohio State (5.4)
5. Thomas Rooks, Illinois (5.4)

=== Yards per reception ===
1. Ronnie Harmon, Iowa (22.0)
2. Cedric Anderson, Ohio State (20.2)
3. Daryl Turner, Michigan State (19.6)
4. Al Toon, Wisconsin (19.6)
5. Dave Moritz, Iowa (18.2)

=== Points scored ===
1. Keith Byars, Ohio State (132)
2. Tom Nichol, Iowa (80)
3. Chris White, Illinois (78)
4. Bob Bergeron, Michigan (76)
5. Gary Ellerson, Wisconsin (66)
5. Thomas Rooks, Illinois (66)

== 1984 NFL draft ==
The 1984 NFL draft was held May 1–2, 1984. The following Big Ten players were selected in the first round of the draft:

Name	Position	Team	Round	Overall pick
Carl Banks	Linebacker	Michigan State	1	3
John Alt	Offensive tackle	Iowa	1	21
William Roberts	Guard	Ohio State	1	27
