= 1983 Ohio State Buckeyes football team =

American college football season

1983 Ohio State Buckeyes football

Fiesta Bowl champion

Fiesta Bowl, W 28–23 vs. Pittsburgh
- Conference: Big Ten Conference

Ranking
- Coaches: No. 8
- AP: No. 9
- Record: 9–3 (6–3 Big Ten)
- Head coach: Earle Bruce (5th season)
- Offensive coordinator: Glen Mason (4th season)
- Defensive coordinator: Bob Tucker (2nd season)
- MVP: John Frank
- Captains: John Frank; Bill Roberts
- Home stadium: Ohio Stadium

1983 Big Ten Conference football standings
	Conf.					Overall
Team	W		L		T	W		L		T
No. 10 Illinois $	9	–	0	–	0	10	–	2	–	0
No. 8 Michigan	8	–	1	–	0	9	–	3	–	0
No. 14 Iowa	7	–	2	–	0	9	–	3	–	0
No. 9 Ohio State	6	–	3	–	0	9	–	3	–	0
Wisconsin	5	–	4	–	0	7	–	4	–	0
Purdue	3	–	5	–	1	3	–	7	–	1
Michigan State	2	–	6	–	1	4	–	6	–	1
Indiana	2	–	7	–	0	3	–	8	–	0
Northwestern	2	–	7	–	0	2	–	9	–	0
Minnesota	0	–	9	–	0	1	–	10	–	0
$ – Conference champion; Rankings from AP Poll

The 1983 Ohio State Buckeyes football team was an American football team that represented the Ohio State University as a member of the Big Ten Conference during the 1983 Big Ten season. In their fifth year under head coach Earle Bruce, the Buckeyes compiled a 9–3 record (6–3 in conference games), finished in fourth place the Big Ten, and outscored opponents by a total of 382 to 183. They opened the season with victories over Oregon and No. 2 Oklahoma, lost to No. 7 Iowa, No. 19 Illinois, and No. 8 Michigan, and concluded the season with a victory over Pittsburgh in the 1984 Fiesta Bowl. They were ranked No. 9 in the final AP poll.

The Buckeyes gained an average of 210.2 rushing yards and 176.8 passing yards per game. On defense, they held opponents to 101.9 rushing yards and 209.3 passing yards per game. The team's statistical leaders included quarterback Mike Tomczak (1,716 passing yards, 56.6% completion percentage), running back Keith Byars (1,126 rushing yards, 5.4 yards per carry, 20 touchdowns), and tight end John Frank (41 receptions for 584 yards). Four Ohio State players received first-team honors on the 1983 All-Big Ten Conference football team: Byars (AP/UPI); Frank (AP/UPI); linebacker Rowland Tatum (AP/UPI); and defensive back Garcia Lane (AP).

The team played its home games at Ohio Stadium in Columbus, Ohio.

== Schedule ==
Date	Time	Opponent	Rank	Site	TV	Result	Attendance	Source
September 10	1:30 p.m.	Oregon*	No. 7	Ohio Stadium; Columbus, OH		W 31–6	88,524	
September 17	3:30 p.m.	at No. 2 Oklahoma*	No. 6	Oklahoma Memorial Stadium; Norman, OK	ABC	W 24–14	75,008	
September 24	3:30 p.m.	at No. 7 Iowa	No. 3	Kinnick Stadium; Iowa City, IA	CBS	L 14–20	66,175	
October 1	1:30 p.m.	Minnesota	No. 8	Ohio Stadium; Columbus, OH		W 69–18	89,192	
October 8	1:30 p.m.	Purdue	No. 6	Ohio Stadium; Columbus, OH		W 33–22	89,384	
October 15	2:00 p.m.	at No. 19 Illinois	No. 6	Memorial Stadium; Champaign, IL (Illibuck)		L 13–17	73,414	
October 22	1:30 p.m.	Michigan State	No. 17	Ohio Stadium; Columbus, OH		W 21–11	89,104	
October 29	1:30 p.m.	Wisconsin	No. 16	Ohio Stadium; Columbus, OH		W 45–27	89,203	
November 5	1:30 p.m.	at Indiana	No. 14	Memorial Stadium; Bloomington, IN		W 56–17	51,176	
November 12	1:30 p.m.	Northwestern	No. 10	Ohio Stadium; Columbus, OH		W 55–7	88,703	
November 19	1:00 p.m.	at No. 8 Michigan	No. 10	Michigan Stadium; Ann Arbor, MI (rivalry)	WXYZ-TV	L 21–24	106,115	
January 2, 1984	1:30 p.m.	vs. No. 15 Pittsburgh*	No. 14	Sun Devil Stadium; Tempe, AZ (Fiesta Bowl)	NBC	W 28–23	66,484	
*Non-conference game; Rankings from AP Poll released prior to the game; All times are in Eastern time

== Game summaries ==
=== Oregon ===
Team	1	2	3	4	Total
Oregon	0	6	0	0	6
• Ohio St	7	3	21	0	31

- Date: September 10
- Location: Ohio Stadium

=== At Oklahoma ===
#6 Ohio State Buckeyes (1–0) at #2 Oklahoma Sooners (1–0)

Quarter	1	2	3	4	Total
Ohio St	7	7	7	3	24
Oklahoma	0	7	7	0	14

at Oklahoma Memorial Stadium • Norman, Oklahoma

- Date: September 17
- Game time: 2:50 p.m. CDT
- Game weather: Sunny • 93 °F (34 °C) • Wind S 17 miles per hour (27 km/h; 15 kn)
- Game attendance: 75,008
- Referee: Tom Quinn (Big Ten)
- TV announcers (ABC): Keith Jackson and Frank Broyles
- Ohio State Football Archive

Game information

Ohio State

- Tomczak
  15/25, 234 Yds, 2 TD, INT
- Lindsey
  16 Rush, 75 Yds
- Frank
  7 Rec, 108 Yds, 2 TD

Oklahoma

- Bradley
  9/21, 170 Yds, TD
- Tillman
  13 Rush, 83 Yds, TD
- Shepard
  3 Rec, 85 Yds, TD

Scoring summary

Quarter	Time	Drive			Team	Scoring information	Score	
Quarter	Time	Plays	Yards	TOP	Team	Scoring information	OSU	OU
1	8:44	13	80	6:16	Ohio St	Frank 16-yard touchdown reception from Tomczak, Spangler kick good	7	0
2	10:57	1	15	0:06	Ohio St	Frank 15-yard touchdown reception from Tomczak, Spangler kick good	14	0
2	9:14	4	85	1:43	Oklahoma	Tillman 37-yard touchdown run, Culver kick good	14	7
3	8:30	10	57		Ohio St	Bates 2-yard touchdown run, Spangler kick good	21	7
3	1:01	8	62		Oklahoma	Shepard 22-yard touchdown reception from Bradley, Culver kick good	21	14
4	9:15	16	59		Ohio St	22-yard field goal by Spangler	24	14
"TOP" = time of possession. For other American football terms, see Glossary of American football.							24	14

=== At Iowa ===
Team	1	2	3	4	Total
Ohio State	7	0	0	7	14
• Iowa	3	0	10	7	20

- Date: September 24
- Location: Kinnick Stadium, Iowa City, Iowa

=== Minnesota ===
Team	1	2	3	4	Total
Minnesota	3	9	0	6	18
• Ohio State	7	31	24	7	69

- Date: October 1
- Location: Ohio Stadium, Columbus, Ohio
- Game start: 1:30 EDT

=== Purdue ===
Purdue Boilermakers (1–2–1) at #6 Ohio State Buckeyes (3–1)

Quarter	1	2	3	4	Total
Purdue	7	0	0	15	22
Ohio St	6	6	14	7	33

at Ohio Stadium, Columbus, Ohio

- Date: October 8, 1983
- Game time: 1:30 p.m. EDT
- Game weather: Sunny, 76 °F (24 °C)
- Game attendance: 89,384
- Referee: Tom Quinn
- Box Score

Game information

First quarter

- OSU – Paul Allen 21-yard field goal, 9:41. Ohio St 3–0. Drive: 11 plays, 61 yards, 5:11.
- OSU – Paul Allen 41-yard field goal, 4:30. Ohio St 6–0. Drive: 10 plays, 45 yards, 3:34.
- PUR – Eric Jordan 40-yard run (Tim Clark kick), 2:27. Purdue 7–6. Drive: 6 plays, 71 yards, 2:00.

Second quarter

- OSU – Keith Byars 4-yard run (pass failed), 5:23. Ohio St 12–7. Drive: 3 plays, 20 yards, 0:59.

Third quarter

- OSU – Garcia Lane 63-yard punt return (Rich Spangler kick), 13:43. Ohio St 19–7.
- OSU – Garcia Lane 71-yard punt return (Rich Spangler kick), 2:51. Ohio St 26–7.

Fourth quarter

- PUR – Tim Clark 39-yard field goal, 14:20. Ohio St 26–10. Drive: 10 plays, 58 yards, 3:31.
- OSU – Keith Byars 2-yard run (Rich Spangler kick), 10:56. Ohio St 33–10. Drive: 6 plays, 80 yards, 3:19.
- PUR – Cliff Benson 5-yard pass from Scott Campbell (pass failed), 3:50. Ohio St 33–16. Drive: 11 plays, 56 yards, 3:59.
- PUR – Mel Gray 20-yard run (pass failed), 2:58. Ohio St 33–22. Drive: 4 plays, 48 yards, 0:46.

Top passers

- PUR – Scott Campbell – 23/36, 228 yards, TD
- OSU – Mike Tomczak – 8/17, 145 yards, 2 INT

Top rushers

- PUR – Eric Jordan – 9 rushes, 89 yards, TD
- OSU – Keith Byars – 23 rushes, 135 yards, 2 TD

Top receivers

- PUR – Steve Griffin – 5 receptions, 62 yards
- OSU – Keith Byars – 4 receptions, 120 yards

=== At Illinois ===
Team	1	2	3	4	Total
Ohio St	0	3	10	0	13
• Illinois	7	3	0	7	17

- Date: October 15
- Location: Memorial Stadium

=== Michigan State ===
Team	1	2	3	4	Total
Michigan St	3	0	0	8	11
• Ohio St	7	7	0	7	21

- Date: October 22
- Location: Ohio Stadium, Columbus, Ohio
- Game start: 1:30 p.m. EST
- Elapsed time: 2:28
- Game attendance: 89,104
- Game weather: Rainy; 56 °F (13 °C); wind 15–25 mph (24–40 km/h) SE
- Referee: Jerry Hendrickson

Scoring summary
Q1	10:08	OHST	Byars 1 yard run (Spangler kick)	OHST 7–0
Q1	4:30	MSU	Mojsiejenko 33 yard field goal	OHST 7–3
Q2	2:17	OHST	Frank 39 yard pass from Karsatos (Spangler kick)	OHST 14–3
Q4	11:47	OHST	Byars 5 yard run (Spangler kick)	OHST 21–3
Q4	:57	MSU	Tyree recovered blocked punt in end zone (Belk pass from Brown)	OHST 21–11

=== Wisconsin ===
Wisconsin Badgers (5–2) at #16 Ohio State Buckeyes (5–2)

Quarter	1	2	3	4	Total
Wisconsin	14	7	6	0	27
Ohio St	7	21	10	7	45

at Ohio Stadium, Columbus, Ohio

- Date: October 29, 1983
- Game time: 1:30 p.m. EDT
- Game weather: Clear, 55 °F (13 °C)
- Game attendance: 89,203
- Referee: Jim Kemerling
- Box Score

Game information

First quarter

- WIS – Gary Ellerson 2-yard run (Kevin Rohde kick), 11:34. Wisconsin 7–0.
- OSU – Thad Jemison 19-yard pass from Mike Tomczak (Rich Spangler kick), 5:25. Tie 7–7.
- WIS – Thad McFadden 20-yard pass from Randy Wright (Kevin Rohde kick), 2:50. Wisconsin 14–7.

Second quarter

- OSU – Mike Tomczak 28-yard run (Rich Spangler kick), 13:19. Tie 14–14.
- OSU – Keith Byars 13-yard run (Rich Spangler kick), 7:16. Ohio St 21–14.
- OSU – Vaughn Broadnax 1-yard run (Rich Spangler kick), 2:07. Ohio St 28–14.
- WIS – Nick Toon 22-yard pass from Randy Wright (Kevin Rohde kick), 0:57. Ohio St 28–21.

Third quarter

- WIS – Brett Pearson 7-yard pass from Randy Wright (kick failed), 11:36. Ohio St 28–27.
- OSU – Rich Spangler 36-yard field goal, 4:41. Ohio St 31–27.
- OSU – Keith Byars 3-yard run (Rich Spangler kick), 1:36. Ohio St 38–27.

Fourth quarter

- OSU – Roman Bates 14-yard run (Rich Spangler kick), 12:48. Ohio St 45–27.

Top passers

- WIS – Randy Wright – 23/39, 319 yards, 3 TD, 4 INT
- OSU – Mike Tomczak – 12/14, 162 yards, TD

Top rushers

- WIS – Joe Armentrout – 10 rushes, 40 yards
- OSU – Keith Byars – 29 rushes, 174 yards, 2 TD

Top receivers

- WIS – Thad McFadden – 3 receptions, 108 yards, TD
- OSU – Cedric Anderson – 4 receptions, 70 yards

Woody Hayes dotted the "i" in the pregame Script Ohio.

External videos
- Script Ohio/Woody Hayes dots the "i"
- Game highlights

=== At Indiana ===
Team	1	2	3	4	Total
• Ohio St	14	14	14	14	56
Indiana	3	0	6	8	17

- Date: November 5
- Location: Memorial Stadium

=== Northwestern ===
Team	1	2	3	4	Total
Northwestern	0	0	0	7	7
• Ohio State	20	21	7	7	55

- Date: November 12
- Location: Ohio Stadium, Columbus, Ohio
- Game attendance: 88,703

=== At Michigan ===
Team	1	2	3	4	Total
Ohio State	0	7	7	7	21
• Michigan	10	0	0	14	24

- Date: November 19
- Location: Michigan Stadium, Ann Arbor, Michigan

=== Vs. Pittsburgh (Fiesta Bowl) ===
1984 Fiesta Bowl

Team	1	2	3	4	Total
• Ohio State	7	7	0	14	28
Pittsburgh	0	7	0	16	23

- Date: January 2, 1984
- Location: Sun Devil Stadium, Tempe, Arizona
- Game attendance: 66,484
- TV announcers (NBC): Charlie Jones, Bob Griese

== Personnel ==
=== Roster ===
1983 Ohio State Buckeyes football team roster
Players
Coaches
Offense

Pos.	#	Name	Class
WR	22	Cedric Anderson	Sr
OT	76	Dan Bachorski	Fr
RB	28	Roman Bates	Fr
FB	46	Ken Blair	So
FB	38	Vaughn Broadnax	Sr
RB	41	Keith Byars	So
FB	48	Jeff Cargile	Fr
OT	77	Jim Carson	Sr
G	79	Larry Chesbrough	So
RB	44	George Cooper	Fr
RB	42	Tony Cooper	Fr
SE	84	Kevin Delaney	So
C	78	Joe Dooley	Sr
TE	89	John Frank (C)	Sr
C	56	Jimn Gilmore	So
G	65	Tom Glancey	Fr
OT	75	Rory Graves	So
TE	85	Judd Groza	Jr
WR	26	Nate Harris	Fr
FL	34	Jay Holland	Jr
G	67	Gene Hulshult	Fr
TE	81	John Hutchinson	Fr
WR	88	Thad Jemison	Sr
RB	24	Ron Jordan	So
QB	16	Jim Karsatos	Fr
RB	27	Emmett Keith-Jones	So
OL	73	Mark Krerowicz	Jr
QB	14	Eric Kumerow	Fr
G	64	Jim Lachey	Jr
WR	1	Mike Lanese	So
RB	20	Kelvin Lindsey	Sr
OL	63	Kirk Lowdermilk	Jr
C	51	John Lucente	So
G	71	Bob Maggs	Fr
OT	62	Tom McCormick	Fr
C	53	Rich Morrise	Fr
C	50	Tim Odom	Fr
QB	7	Brent Offenbecher	Sr
OT	70	Bill Roberts (C)	Sr
FL	18	Johnny Ross	Fr
TE	86	Rob Selvaggio	Jr
OT	69	Jay Shaffer	Fr
SE	49	Doug Smith	So
QB	6	Tim Stephens	Sr
TE	80	Ed Taggart	Fr
QB	15	Mike Tomczak	Jr
FL	83	Dave Wagner	So
RB	43	Barry Walker	Fr
C	52	Doug Whitmer	Jr
RB	25	John Woolridge	Fr
OL	74	Scott Zalenski	Jr

Defense

Pos.	#	Name	Class
OLB	9	Gary Alders	Jr
LB	17	Clark Backus	Sr
S	4	Kelvin Bell	Jr
OLB	96	Tom Bose	Fr
DT	84	Henry Brown	Fr
OLB	94	Chris Cicero	Sr
CB	24	Jeff Cisco	Sr
DT	42	Ray Conlin	Jr
DT	97	Dave Crecelius	Jr
OLB	11	Curt Curtis	Sr
OLB	66	Rich Czyzynski	Sr
CB	2	Shaun Gayle	Sr
MG	59	Tony Giuliani	Jr
CB	39	Sonny Gordon	Fr
CB	23	Rod Gorley	Sr
LB	92	Reggie Graves	Fr
LB	60	Bill Harvey	Jr
DB	27	Doug Hill	Sr
DB	19	Steve Hill	Fr
DT	68	Mark Hocevar	Jr
DT	55	Ray Holliman	Fr
OLB	58	Dennis Hueston	So
CB	47	Ray Jackson	Fr
LB	35	Joe Jenkins	Fr
LB	98	Pepper Johnson	So
LB	30	Mike Kee	Fr
DT	91	Jim Klohn	Fr
LB	33	Larry Kolic	Jr
DT	93	Larry Kotterman	Fr
CB	12	Garcia Lane (C)	Sr
CB	8	Scott Leach	Fr
OLB	82	Byron Lee	So
MG	95	Darryl Lee	Fr
OLB	37	Orlando Lowry	Sr
DT	72	Mike Machinsky	Fr
DT	57	Dave Morrill	Jr
MG	54	Spencer Nelms	Jr
CB	3	Jim Palmer	Jr
LB	99	Mark Pfister	Fr
CB	83	Murphy Ray	Fr
S	21	Kevin Richardson	Jr
LB	90	Fred Ridder	Fr
DT	61	John Sullivan	So
LB	32	Rowland Tatum (C)	Sr
S	29	Terry White	Fr

Special teams

Pos.	#	Name	Class
K	88	Paul Allen	Jr
P	5	Karl Edwards	Sr
P	87	Ken Grimmer	So
K	36	Tim Marsh	Jr
K	13	Scott Neff	So
K	10	Rich Spangler	So

Head coach

- Earle Bruce

Coordinators/assistant coaches

- Dom Capers (DB)
- Steve Devine (Recruiting)
- Randy Hart (DL)
- Glen Mason (OC)
- Bill Myles (OL)
- Fred Pagac (LB)
- Wayne Stanley (RB)
- Jim Tressel (QB)
- Bob Tucker (DC)

Legend

- (C) Team captain
- (S) Suspended
- (I) Ineligible
- Injured
- Redshirt

=== Depth chart ===
Defense

FS
4 Kelvin Bell
⋅
⋅

ROLB	ILB	ILB	LOLB
37 Orlando Lowry	32 Rowland Tatum	17 Clark Backus	11 Curt Curtis
82 Byron Lee	33 Larry Kolic	98 Pepper Johnson	66 Rich Czyzynski
⋅	⋅	⋅	58 Dennis Hueston

ROV
27 Doug Hill
19 Steve Hill
⋅

CB
2 Shaun Gayle
21 Kevin Richardson
⋅

DE	NT	DE
97 Dave Crecelius	54 Spencer Nelms	57 Dave Morrill
42 Ray Conlin	59 Tony Giuliani	84 Henry Brown
⋅	95 Darryl Lee	⋅

CB
12 Garcia Lane
7 Sonny Gordon
⋅

Offense

SE
88 Thad Jemison
49 Doug Smith
⋅

LT	LG	C	RG	RT
70 William Roberts	64 Jim Lachey	78 Joe Dooley	74 Scott Zalenski	77 Jim Carson
73 Mark Krerowicz	63 Kirk Lowdermilk	50 Tim Odom	71 Bob Maggs	75 Rory Graves
⋅	⋅	⋅	⋅	62 Tom McCormick

TE
89 John Frank
80 Judd Groza
81 John Hutchinson

FL
22 Cedric Anderson
34 Jay Holland
83 Dave Wagner

QB
15 Mike Tomczak
16 Jim Karsatos
7 Brent Offenbecher

Key reserves
28 Roman Bates (TB/FB)
25 John Wooldridge (TB)

FB
38 Vaughn Broadnax
43 Barry Walker
48 Jeff Cargile

Special teams
PK 10 Rich Spangler
P 5 Karl Edwards

RB
41 Keith Byars
20 Kelvin Lindsey
25 John Wooldridge

== 1984 NFL draftees ==
Player	Round	Pick	Position	NFL club
William Roberts	1	27	Guard	New York Giants
John Frank	2	56	Tight end	San Francisco 49ers
Garcia Lane	3	61	Defensive back	Kansas City Chiefs
Rowland Tatum	6	165	Linebacker	Miami Dolphins
Shaun Gayle	10	271	Defensive back	Chicago Bears
Joe Dooley	10	274	Center	Los Angeles Rams
Thad Jemison	12	310	Wide receiver	Tampa Bay Buccaneers
