= 1983 Indiana Hoosiers football team =

American college football season

1983 Indiana Hoosiers football
- Conference: Big Ten Conference
- Record: 3–8 (2–7 Big Ten)
- Head coach: Sam Wyche (1st season)
- Defensive coordinator: Ron Corradini (3rd season)
- MVPs: Duane Gunn; Steve Bradley; Len Kenebrew
- Captains: Joe Fitzgerald; Scot McNabb; Mark Smythe
- Home stadium: Memorial Stadium

1983 Big Ten Conference football standings
	Conf.					Overall
Team	W		L		T	W		L		T
No. 10 Illinois $	9	–	0	–	0	10	–	2	–	0
No. 8 Michigan	8	–	1	–	0	9	–	3	–	0
No. 14 Iowa	7	–	2	–	0	9	–	3	–	0
No. 9 Ohio State	6	–	3	–	0	9	–	3	–	0
Wisconsin	5	–	4	–	0	7	–	4	–	0
Purdue	3	–	5	–	1	3	–	7	–	1
Michigan State	2	–	6	–	1	4	–	6	–	1
Indiana	2	–	7	–	0	3	–	8	–	0
Northwestern	2	–	7	–	0	2	–	9	–	0
Minnesota	0	–	9	–	0	1	–	10	–	0
$ – Conference champion; Rankings from AP Poll

The 1983 Indiana Hoosiers football team represented Indiana University Bloomington during the 1983 Big Ten Conference football season. Led by Sam Wyche in his first and only season as head coach, the Hoosiers compiled an overall record of 3–8 with a mark of 2–7 in conference play, tying for eighth place in the Big Ten. The team played home games at Memorial Stadium in Bloomington, Indiana.

== Schedule ==
Date	Opponent	Site	Result	Attendance	Source
September 10	Duke*	Memorial Stadium; Bloomington, IN	W 15–10	41,120	
September 17	at Kentucky*	Commonwealth Stadium; Lexington, KY (rivalry)	L 13–24	56,825	
September 24	Northwestern	Memorial Stadium; Bloomington, IN	L 8–10	40,347	
October 1	at No. 14 Michigan	Michigan Stadium; Ann Arbor, MI	L 18–43	104,126	
October 8	Minnesota	Memorial Stadium; Bloomington, IN	W 38–31	41,111	
October 15	Michigan State^{†}	Memorial Stadium; Bloomington, IN (rivalry)	W 24–12	46,088	
October 22	at Wisconsin	Camp Randall Stadium; Madison, WI	L 14–45	78,199	
October 29	at No. 17 Iowa	Kinnick Stadium; Iowa City, IA	L 3–49	66,055	
November 5	No. 14 Ohio State	Memorial Stadium; Bloomington, IN	L 17–56	51,176	
November 12	at No. 5 Illinois	Memorial Stadium; Champaign, IL (rivalry)	L 21–49	73,612	
November 19	Purdue	Memorial Stadium; Bloomington, IN (Old Oaken Bucket)	L 30–31	52,038	
*Non-conference game; ^{†}Homecoming; Rankings from AP Poll released prior to the game

== Game summaries ==
=== Purdue ===
Purdue Boilermakers (2–7–1) at Indiana Hoosiers (3–7)

Quarter	1	2	3	4	Total
Purdue	0	21	3	7	31
Indiana	0	14	0	16	30

at Memorial Stadium, Bloomington, Indiana

- Date: November 19, 1983
- Game attendance: 52,038

Game information

First quarter

- No scoring

Second quarter

- PUR – Mel Gray 1-yard run (Tim Clark kick). Purdue 7–0.
- IU – Orlando Brown 8-yard run (Doug Smith kick). Tie 7–7.
- PUR – Jeff Price 13-yard pass from Scott Campbell (Tim Clark kick). Purdue 14–7.
- PUR – Scott Campbell 1-yard run (Tim Clark kick). Purdue 21–7.
- IU – Len Kenebrew 22-yard pass from Steve Bradley (Doug Smith kick). Purdue 21–14.

Third quarter

- PUR – Tim Clark 34-yard field goal. Purdue 24–14.

Fourth quarter

- IU – Doug Smith 43-yard field goal. Purdue 24–17.
- PUR – Mel Gray 2-yard run (Tim Clark kick). Purdue 31–17.
- IU – Bobby Howard 7-yard run (Doug Smith kick). Purdue 31–24.
- IU – Duane Gunn 45-yard pass from Steve Bradley (pass failed). Purdue 31–30.

Top passers

- PUR – Scott Campbell – 9/16, 102 yards, TD
- IU – Steve Bradley – 16/30, 295 yards, 2 TD, INT

Top rushers

- PUR – Mel Gray – 36 rushes, 176 yards, 2 TD
- IU – Orlando Brown – 16 rushes, 53 yards, TD

Top receivers

- PUR – Cliff Benson – 2 receptions, 40 yards
- IU – Duane Gunn – 5 receptions, 140 yards, TD

External videos
- Game highlights (local news)

== Personnel ==
1983 Indiana Hoosiers football team roster
Players
Coaches
Offense

Pos.	#	Name	Class
OL		Kevin Allen
OL		Mike Anderson
TE		Stephen Benson
QB		Steve Bradley
RB		Orlando Brown
RB		Jim Caldwell
QB		Cam Cameron
TE		Chris Cook
WR		Stacy Dawsey
OL		Mark Filburn
OL		George Gianakpoulos
RB		Alex Green
WR		Duane Gunn
RB		Todd Hansley
RB		Bobby Howard
RB		Chuck Howard
WR		Len Kenebrew
TE		Scot McNabb
RB		Johnnie Salters
OL		Tim Sakanich
OL		Bob Sikora
WR		Terry Smith
RB		Larry Streeter
OL		Tom Van Dyck
RB		Jack Walsh

Defense

Pos.	#	Name	Class
LB		Leonard Bell
DB		Nate Borders
LB		Mark Claahsen
LB		Lou Cristofoli
DL		Tim Eckert
LB		Dennis Edwards
LB		Joe Fitzgerald
DL		Vince Fisher
DB		Tom Henrickson
LB		Dave Kinniry
DL		Steve May
DB		Jeff McBain
DL		Rob Schmit
DB		Chris Sigler
DL		Mark Smythe
LB		Van Waiters
DL		Dave Zyzda

Special teams

Pos.	#	Name	Class
P		Chuck Razmic
K		Doug Smith

Head coach

- Sam Wyche

Coordinators/assistant coaches

Legend

- (C) Team captain
- (S) Suspended
- (I) Ineligible
- Injured
- Redshirt

== 1984 NFL draftees ==
Player	Position	Round	Pick	NFL team
Mark Smythe	Defensive tackle	10	269	Arizona Cardinals
