= 1983 Minnesota Golden Gophers football team =

American college football season

1983 Minnesota Golden Gophers football
- Conference: Big Ten Conference
- Record: 1–10 (0–9 Big Ten)
- Head coach: Joe Salem (5th season)
- Defensive coordinator: Chuck Dickerson (1st season)
- MVP: Randy Rasmussen
- Captain: Randy Rasmussen
- Home stadium: Hubert H. Humphrey Metrodome

1983 Big Ten Conference football standings
	Conf.					Overall
Team	W		L		T	W		L		T
No. 10 Illinois $	9	–	0	–	0	10	–	2	–	0
No. 8 Michigan	8	–	1	–	0	9	–	3	–	0
No. 14 Iowa	7	–	2	–	0	9	–	3	–	0
No. 9 Ohio State	6	–	3	–	0	9	–	3	–	0
Wisconsin	5	–	4	–	0	7	–	4	–	0
Purdue	3	–	5	–	1	3	–	7	–	1
Michigan State	2	–	6	–	1	4	–	6	–	1
Indiana	2	–	7	–	0	3	–	8	–	0
Northwestern	2	–	7	–	0	2	–	9	–	0
Minnesota	0	–	9	–	0	1	–	10	–	0
$ – Conference champion; Rankings from AP Poll

The 1983 Minnesota Golden Gophers football team represented the University of Minnesota in the 1983 NCAA Division I-A football season. In their fifth and final year under head coach Joe Salem, the Golden Gophers compiled a 1–10 record and were outscored by their opponents by a combined total of 518 to 181.

Offensive tackle Randy Rasmussen received the team's Most Valuable Player award, while tight end Jay Carroll was named offensive MVP, and linebacker Peter Najarian was named the defensive MVP. Najarian was named All-Big Ten second team. Najarian and split end Fred Hartwig were named Academic All-Big Ten.

Total attendance for the season was 243,674, which averaged to 48,734. The season high for attendance was against Wisconsin, although the game against Nebraska drew only two people less. Attendance vs. the Badgers and Cornhuskers was buoyed by a large number of visiting fans traveling to Minneapolis.

== Schedule ==
Date	Opponent	Site	Result	Attendance	Source
September 10	at Rice*	Rice Stadium; Houston, TX	W 21–17	10,000	
September 17	No. 1 Nebraska*	Hubert H. Humphrey Metrodome; Minneapolis, MN (rivalry)	L 13–84	62,687	
September 24	Purdue	Hubert H. Humphrey Metrodome; Minneapolis, MN	L 20–32	41,839	
October 1	at No. 8 Ohio State	Ohio Stadium; Columbus, OH	L 18–69	89,192	
October 8	at Indiana	Memorial Stadium; Bloomington, IN	L 31–38	41,111	
October 15	Wisconsin^{†}	Hubert H. Humphrey Metrodome; Minneapolis, MN (rivalry)	L 17–56	62,689	
October 22	at Northwestern	Dyche Stadium; Evanston, IL	L 8–19	21,411	
October 29	at Michigan State	Spartan Stadium; East Lansing, MI	L 10–34	76,481	
November 5	No. 6 Illinois	Hubert H. Humphrey Metrodome; Minneapolis, MN	L 23–50	35,514	
November 12	No. 9 Michigan	Hubert H. Humphrey Metrodome; Minneapolis, MN	L 10–58	40,945	
November 19	at No. 11 Iowa	Kinnick Stadium; Iowa City, IA (rivalry)	L 10–61	66,160	
*Non-conference game; ^{†}Homecoming; Rankings from AP Poll released prior to the game

== Roster ==
- C Randy Rasmussen
