= 1983 Iowa Hawkeyes football team =

American college football season

1983 Iowa Hawkeyes football

Gator Bowl, L 14–6 vs. Florida
- Conference: Big Ten Conference

Ranking
- Coaches: No. 14
- AP: No. 14
- Record: 9–3 (7–2 Big Ten)
- Head coach: Hayden Fry (5th season)
- Offensive coordinator: Bill Snyder (5th season)
- Offensive scheme: Pro-style
- Defensive coordinator: Bill Brashier (5th season)
- Base defense: 5–2
- MVPs: Norm Granger; Chuck Long; Dave Moritz
- Captains: Norm Granger; Jon Roehlk; Dave Strobel
- Home stadium: Kinnick Stadium

1983 Big Ten Conference football standings
	Conf.					Overall
Team	W		L		T	W		L		T
No. 10 Illinois $	9	–	0	–	0	10	–	2	–	0
No. 8 Michigan	8	–	1	–	0	9	–	3	–	0
No. 14 Iowa	7	–	2	–	0	9	–	3	–	0
No. 9 Ohio State	6	–	3	–	0	9	–	3	–	0
Wisconsin	5	–	4	–	0	7	–	4	–	0
Purdue	3	–	5	–	1	3	–	7	–	1
Michigan State	2	–	6	–	1	4	–	6	–	1
Indiana	2	–	7	–	0	3	–	8	–	0
Northwestern	2	–	7	–	0	2	–	9	–	0
Minnesota	0	–	9	–	0	1	–	10	–	0
$ – Conference champion; Rankings from AP Poll

The 1983 Iowa Hawkeyes football team was an American football team that represented the University of Iowa as a member of the Big Ten Conference during the 1983 Big Ten football season. In their fifth season under head coach Hayden Fry, the Hawkeyes compiled a 9–3 record (7–2 in conference games), finished in third place in the Big Ten, and outscored opponents by a total of 374 to 175. They concluded the season with a loss to Florida in the Gator Bowl and were ranked No. 14 in the final AP nd UPI polls.

The offense broke 35 school records, including most yards of total offense in a season (5,647) and in a game (713), and most passing yards in a season (3,239) and in a game (420). The team was led on offense by quarterback Chuck Long. Defensive standouts included linebacker Larry Station and defensive back Mike Stoops.

The team played its home games at Kinnick Stadium in Iowa City, Iowa.

== Schedule ==
Date	Time	Opponent	Rank	Site	TV	Result	Attendance	Source
September 10		at Iowa State*	No. 16	Cyclone Stadium; Ames, IA (rivalry)	ABC	W 51–10	54,066	
September 17		at Penn State*	No. 13	Beaver Stadium; University Park, PA		W 42–34	84,628	
September 24	2:30 p.m.	No. 3 Ohio State	No. 7	Kinnick Stadium; Iowa City, IA	CBS	W 20–14	66,175	
October 1		at Illinois	No. 4	Memorial Stadium; Champaign, IL		L 0–33	73,351	
October 8		Northwestern^{†}	No. 15	Kinnick Stadium; Iowa City, IA		W 61–21	66,125	
October 15		Purdue	No. 14	Kinnick Stadium; Iowa City, IA		W 31–14	66,105	
October 22	11:00 a.m.	at No. 10 Michigan	No. 12	Michigan Stadium; Ann Arbor, MI	ABC	L 13–16	104,559	
October 29		Indiana	No. 17	Kinnick Stadium; Iowa City, IA		W 49–3	66,055	
November 5		at Wisconsin	No. 15	Camp Randall Stadium; Madison, WI (rivalry)		W 34–14	78,105	
November 12		at Michigan State	No. 12	Spartan Stadium; East Lansing, MI		W 12–6	72,528	
November 19		Minnesota	No. 11	Kinnick Stadium; Iowa City, IA (rivalry)		W 61–10	66,160	
December 30	7:00 p.m.	vs. No. 11 Florida*	No. 10	Gator Bowl Stadium; Jacksonville, FL (Gator Bowl)	ABC	L 6–14	81,293	
*Non-conference game; ^{†}Homecoming; Rankings from AP Poll released prior to the game; All times are in Central time; Source:

== Rankings ==
Ranking movements Legend: ██ Increase in ranking ██ Decrease in ranking
	Week															
Poll	Pre	1	2	3	4	5	6	7	8	9	10	11	12	13	14	Final
AP	16	16	13	7	4	15	14	12	17	15	12	11	10	10	10	14
Coaches	20	17	12	6	3	14	13	12	17	14	9	11	10	10	10	14

== Game summaries ==
=== at Iowa State ===
#16 Iowa at Iowa State
Battle for the Cy-Hawk Trophy

Team	1	2	3	4	Total
• No. 16 Hawkeyes	17	14	6	14	51
Cyclones	0	3	0	7	10

- Date: September 10
- Location: Cyclone Stadium, Ames, Iowa
- Game attendance: 54,066
- TV announcers (ABC): Curt Gowdy and Lee Grosscup
- Sources: Box Score and Game Story

Scoring summary
1		IOWA	Granger 24-yard pass from Long (Nichol kick)	Iowa 7–0
1		IOWA	Nichol 42-yard field goal	Iowa 10–0
1		IOWA	Gill 31-yard run (Nichol kick)	Iowa 17–0
2		IOWA	Gill 2-yard run (Nichol kick)	Iowa 24–0
2		ISU	Bachrodt 36-yard field goal	Iowa 24–3
2		IOWA	Gill 1-yard run (Nichol kick)	Iowa 31–3
3		IOWA	Long 2-yard run (kick failed)	Iowa 37–3
4		IOWA	Gill 3-yard run (Nichol kick)	Iowa 44–3
4		IOWA	Jackson 6-yard run (Nichol kick)	Iowa 51–3
4	0:58	ISU	Posey 65-yard pass from Hood (Bachrodt kick)	Iowa 51–10

This was the first of 15 straight wins in the series for the Hawkeyes.

- Owen Gill 16 Rush, 136 Yds, 4 TD

=== at Penn State ===
#13 Iowa at Penn State

Team	1	2	3	4	Total
• No. 13 Hawkeyes	14	0	21	7	42
Nittany Lions	7	14	7	6	34

- Date: September 17
- Location: Beaver Stadium, University Park, Pennsylvania
- Game attendance: 84,628
- Sources: Box Score and Game Story

Scoring summary
1	PSU	DiMidio 9-yard pass from Strang (Gancitano kick)	PSU 7–0
1	IOWA	Phillips 1-yard run (Nichol kick)	Tied 7–7
1	IOWA	Gill 4-yard run (Nichol kick)	IOWA 14–7
2	PSU	Jackson 7-yard pass from Strang (Gancitano kick)	Tied 14–14
2	PSU	Strang 1-yard run (Gancitano kick)	PSU 21–14
3	IOWA	Phillips 26-yard pass from Long (Nichol kick)	Tied 21–21
3	PSU	Baugh 18-yard pass from Strang (Gancitano kick)	PSU 28–21
3	IOWA	Long 5-yard run (Nichol kick)	Tied 28–28
3	IOWA	Granger 23-yard run (Nichol kick)	IOWA 35–28
4	IOWA	Harmon 77-yard pass from Long (Nichol kick)	IOWA 42–28
4	PSU	Nichols 7-yard run (pass failed)	IOWA 42–34

=== No. 3 Ohio State ===
#3 Ohio State at #7 Iowa

Team	1	2	3	4	Total
No. 3 Buckeyes	7	0	0	7	14
• No. 7 Hawkeyes	3	0	10	7	20

- Date: September 24
- Location: Kinnick Stadium, Iowa City, Iowa
- Game attendance: 66,175
- Television network: CBS
- Sources: Box score and Game story, Box score Archived 2015-11-26 at the Wayback Machine

Scoring summary
1	8:12	IOWA	Tom Nichol 25-yard field goal	IOWA 3–0
1	1:43	OHST	Keith Byars 1-yard run (Spangler kick)	OHST 7–3
3	12:09	IOWA	Mike Hufford 16-yard pass from Chuck Long (Nichol kick)	IOWA 10–7
3	3:34	IOWA	Tom Nichol 47-yard field goal	IOWA 13–7
4	4:25	IOWA	Dave Moritz 73-yard pass from Chuck Long (Nichol kick)	IOWA 20–7
4	2:21	OHST	Broadnax 4-yard pass from Mike Tomczak (Spangler kick)	Iowa 20–14

The Hawkeyes earned their first win over the Buckeyes since 1962.

=== at Illinois ===
#4 Iowa at Illinois

Team	1	2	3	4	Total
No. 4 Hawkeyes	0	0	0	0	0
• Fighting Illini	17	10	0	6	33

- Date: October 1
- Location: Memorial Stadium, Champaign, Illinois
- Game attendance: 73,351
- Sources: Box Score and Game Story

Scoring summary
1	ILL	C. White 30-yard field goal	ILL 3–0
1	ILL	Brookins 54-yard pass from Trudeau (C. White kick)	ILL 10–0
1	ILL	Benson 12-yard pass from Trudeau (C. White kick)	ILL 17–0
2	ILL	D. Williams 6-yard pass from Trudeau (C. White kick)	ILL 24–0
2	ILL	C. White 20-yard field goal	ILL 27–0
4	ILL	C. White 47-yard field goal	ILL 30–0
4	ILL	C. White 45-yard field goal	ILL 33–0

The Hawkeyes – ranked #3 in the Coaches poll and #4 in the AP poll – could not break through on this day in Champaign. Illinois would go on to win the outright Big Ten title by finishing 9-0 in conference play.

=== Northwestern ===
Northwestern at #15 Iowa

Team	1	2	3	4	Total
Wildcats	0	7	7	7	21
• No. 15 Hawkeyes	17	17	14	13	61

- Date: October 8
- Location: Kinnick Stadium, Iowa City, Iowa
- Game attendance: 66,125
- Sources: Box Score and Game Story

Scoring summary
1	IOWA	Long 1-yard run (Nichol kick)	IOWA 7–0
1	IOWA	Olejniczak 18-yard pass from Long (Nichol kick)	IOWA 14–0
1	IOWA	Nichol 45-yard field goal	IOWA 17–0
2	NW	Schwab 9-yard run (Duvic kick)	IOWA 17–7
2	IOWA	Phillips 3-yard run (Nichol kick)	IOWA 24–7
2	IOWA	Phillips 8-yard run (Nichol kick)	Iowa 31–7
2	IOWA	Nichol 32-yard field goal	IOWA 34–7
3	IOWA	Moritz 19-yard pass from Long (Nichol kick)	IOWA 41–7
3	NW	Edwards 5-yard run (Duvic kick)	IOWA 41–14
3	IOWA	Harmon 60-yard pass from Long (Nichol kick)	IOWA 48–14
4	IOWA	Smith 86-yard pass from Grogan (Nichol kick)	IOWA 55–14
4	IOWA	Helverson 15-yard pass from Robertson (kick failed)	Iowa 61–14
4	NW	Harvey 6-yard pass from Burton (Duvic kick)	IOWA 61–21

The Hawkeyes set a Big Ten record with 713 yards of total offense.

- Chuck Long: 23-33, 420 yards, 4 TD (1 rushing)

=== Purdue ===
Purdue at #14 Iowa

Team	1	2	3	4	Total
Boilermakers	7	7	0	0	14
• No. 14 Hawkeyes	7	17	7	0	31

- Date: October 15
- Location: Kinnick Stadium, Iowa City, Iowa
- Game attendance: 66,105
- Sources: Box Score and Game Story

Scoring summary
1	Purdue	Campbell 1-yard run (Clark kick)	Purdue 7-0
1	IOWA	O. Gill 2-yard run (Nichol kick)	Tied 7-7
2	Purdue	Scott 12-yard pass from Campbell (Clark kick)	Purdue 14-7
2	IOWA	Long 5-yard run (Nichol kick)	Tied 14-14
2	IOWA	Nichol 47-yard field goal	IOWA 17-14
2	IOWA	Smith 55-yard punt return (Nichol kick)	IOWA 24-14
3	IOWA	O. Gill 1-yard run (Nichol kick)	IOWA 31-14

=== at No. 10 Michigan ===
#12 Iowa at #10 Michigan

Team	1	2	3	4	Total
No. 12 Hawkeyes	0	3	0	10	13
• No. 10 Wolverines	3	3	7	3	16

- Date: October 22
- Location: Michigan Stadium • Ann Arbor, Michigan
- Game attendance: 104,559
- TV announcers (ABC): Keith Jackson & Frank Broyles
- Sources: Box Score and Game Story

Scoring summary
1		MICH	Bergeron 37-yard field goal	Michigan 3-0
2		MICH	Bergeron 20-yard field goal	Michigan 6-0
2	0:53	IOWA	Nichol 56-yard field goal	Michigan 6-3
3		MICH	Rogers 4-yard run (Bergeron kick)	Michigan 13-3
4		IOWA	Olejniczak 3-yard pass from Grogan (Nichol kick)	Michigan 13-10
4		IOWA	Nichol 27-yard field goal	Tie 13-13
4	0:08	MICH	Bergeron 45-yard field goal	Michigan 16-13

=== Indiana ===
Indiana at #17 Iowa

Team	1	2	3	4	Total
Hoosiers	0	3	0	0	3
• No. 17 Hawkeyes	21	7	7	14	49

- Date: October 29
- Location: Kinnick Stadium, Iowa City, Iowa
- Game attendance: 66,055
- Sources: Box Score and Game Story

Scoring summary
1	IOWA	O. Gill 16-yard run (Nichol kick)	IOWA 7-0
1	IOWA	Moritz 20-yard pass from Long (Nichol kick)	IOWA 14-0
1	IOWA	Long 11-yard run (Nichol kick)	IOWA 21-0
2	Indiana	Smith 41-yard field goal	IOWA 21-3
2	IOWA	E. Phillips 18-yard run (Nichol kick)	IOWA 28-3
3	IOWA	O. Gill 2-yard run (Nichol kick)	IOWA 35-3
4	IOWA	Moritz 11-yard pass from Grogan (Nichol kick)	IOWA 42-3
4	IOWA	Helverson 10-yard pass from Robertson (Nichol kick)	IOWA 49-3

- Dave Moritz – 11 receptions, 192 receiving yards, 2 TD

=== at Wisconsin ===
#15 Iowa at Wisconsin
Rivalry Game

Team	1	2	3	4	Total
• No. 15 Hawkeyes	14	13	7	0	34
Badgers	0	0	0	14	14

- Date: November 5
- Location: Camp Randall Stadium, Madison, Wisconsin
- Game attendance: 78,105
- Sources: Box Score and Game Story

Scoring summary
1	IOWA	E. Phillips 2-yard run (Nichol kick)	IOWA 7–0
1	IOWA	R. Harmon 12-yard pass from Long (Nichol kick)	IOWA 14–0
2	IOWA	Moritz 12-yard pass from Long (Nichol kick)	IOWA 21–0
2	IOWA	Hayes 20-yard pass from Long (pass failed)	IOWA 27–0
3	IOWA	M. Hufford 6-yard pass from Long (Nichol kick)	IOWA 34–0
4	WIS	Al Toon 44-yard pass from Wright (Rohde kick)	IOWA 34–7
4	WIS	Harrison 11-yard run (Rohde kick)	IOWA 34–14

- Chuck Long – 4 TD passes
- Eddie Phillips – 162 Rush yards, TD

=== at Michigan State ===
#12 Iowa at Michigan State

Team	1	2	3	4	Total
• No. 12 Hawkeyes	0	3	9	0	12
Spartans	0	0	0	6	6

- Date: November 12
- Location: Spartan Stadium, East Lansing, Michigan
- Game attendance: 72,528
- Sources: Box Score and Game Story

Scoring summary
2	IOWA	Tom Nichol 39-yard field goal	IOWA 3-0
3	IOWA	Tom Nichol 40-yard field goal	IOWA 6-0
3	IOWA	R. Harmon 9-yard pass from Chuck Long (pass failed)	IOWA 12-0
4	MSU	Phil Parker 30-yard blocked punt return (kick failed)	IOWA 12-6

=== Minnesota ===
Minnesota at #11 Iowa
Battle for Floyd of Rosedale

Team	1	2	3	4	Total
Golden Gophers	0	7	0	3	10
• No. 11 Hawkeyes	17	17	7	20	61

- Date: November 19
- Location: Kinnick Stadium, Iowa City, Iowa
- Game attendance: 66,160
- Sources: Box score

Scoring summary
1	IOWA	E. Phillips 80-yard run (Nichol kick)	IOWA 7-0
1	IOWA	Tom Nichol 25-yard field goal	IOWA 10-0
1	IOWA	Phillips 9-yard run (Nichol kick)	IOWA 17-0
2	IOWA	Tom Nichol 22-yard field goal	IOWA 20-0
2	IOWA	O. Gill 41-yard run (Nichol kick)	IOWA 27-0
2	IOWA	R. Harmon 25-yard pass from Robertson (Nichol kick)	IOWA 34-0
2	MINN	Starks 66-yard pass from Sadek (Gallery kick)	IOWA 34-7
3	IOWA	R. Harmon 22-yard run (Nichol kick)	IOWA 41-7
4	IOWA	Phillips 1-yard run (kick failed)	IOWA 47-7
4	IOWA	N. Granger 65-yard run (Nichol kick)	IOWA 54-7
4	MINN	Gallery 42-yard field goal	IOWA 54-10
4	IOWA	R. Harmon 11-yard run (Nichol kick)	IOWA 61-10

The Hawkeyes rolled up a school-record 517 yards rushing against the Gophers. Three Iowa backs went over 100 yards, led by Eddie Phillips with 172 yards and 3 touchdowns. Ronnie Harmon had 75 yards and 2 touchdowns on only 4 carries, and also caught a touchdown pass.

=== vs. No. 11 Florida (Gator Bowl) ===
#10 Iowa vs. #11 Florida

Team	1	2	3	4	Total
No. 10 Hawkeyes	0	3	3	0	6
• No. 11 Gators	7	7	0	0	14

- Date: December 30
- Location: Gator Bowl Stadium • Jacksonville, Florida
- Game start: 8:13 p.m. EST
- Elapsed time: 3:17
- Game attendance: 81,293
- Game weather: 35 °F (2 °C), Clear, Wind N 7 mph (11 km/h)
- Referee: James Garvey
- TV announcers (ABC): Al Michaels & Frank Broyles

Scoring summary
1	0:40	UF	Neal Anderson 1-yard run (Raymond kick)	Florida 7-0
2	5:45	IOWA	Tom Nichol 32-yard field goal	Florida 7-3
2	1:08	UF	Drew fumble recovery in end zone (Raymond kick)	Florida 14-3
3	11:00	IOWA	Tom Nichol 31-yard field goal	Florida 14-6

== Personnel ==
=== Roster ===
1983 Iowa Hawkeyes football team roster
Players
Coaches
Offense

Pos.	#	Name	Class
OT	78	John Alt	Sr
TE	80	Mike Bennett	So
WR	27	Bill Broghamer	Sr
OT	61	Dave Croston	Fr
RB	33	Owen Gill	Jr
FB	26	Norm Granger (C)	Sr
QB	13	Tom Grogan	Sr
OT	79	Mike Haight	So
G	68	Tim Hanna	Sr
WR	40	Bill Happel	So
RB	31	Ronnie Harmon	So
TE	34	Jonathan Hayes	So
WR	87	Scott Helverson	So
C	53	Joel Hilgenberg	Sr
TE	86	Mike Hufford	Sr
G	65	Tom Humphrey	So
RB	42	Treye Jackson
OT	55	Joe Levelis	Sr
QB	16	Chuck Long	So
FB	46	John Marchese
WR	5	Dave Moritz	Sr
TE	88	Lon Olejniczak	Sr
RB	22	Eddie Phillips	Sr
G	66	Jon Roehlk (C)	Sr
QB		Mark Vlasic	Fr

Defense

Pos.	#	Name	Class
CB	29	Nate Creer	So
DB	44	Craig Hartman	Jr
DE	91	Mike Hooks	So
DL	64	Paul Hufford	Jr
DB	14	Keith Hunter	Jr
DT	77	George Little	Jr
DE	98	George Millett	So
DB	21	Devon Mitchell	So
DB	45	Jay Norvell	So
DL	50	Hap Peterson	So
LB	38	Kevin Spitzig	Jr
LB	36	Larry Station	So
DB	41	Mike Stoops	Jr
DB	46	Jim Yost	Jr
DE	97	Dave Strobel (C)	Jr
DE	92	Tony Wancket	So
DL	51	Bill Weires	So
DL	57	Jon Vrieze	Fr
LB	39	Mike Yacullo	Sr

Special teams

Pos.	#	Name	Class
P/K	3	Tom Nichol	Jr

Head coach

- Hayden Fry

Coordinators/assistant coaches

- Bill Snyder – Offensive Coordinator/Quarterbacks
- Bill Brashier – Defensive Coordinator
- Kirk Ferentz – Offensive line
- Carl Jackson – Running backs
- Del Miller – Offensive assistant
- Dan McCarney – Defensive line
- Barry Alvarez – Linebackers
- Don Patterson – Defensive Backs
- Bernie Wyatt – Defensive Ends/Recruiting Coordinator
- Bill Dervich – Strength and Conditioning
- Bob Stoops – Graduate assistant
- Bruce Kittle – Graduate assistant

Legend

- (C) Team captain
- (S) Suspended
- (I) Ineligible
- Injured
- Redshirt

=== Coaching staff ===
Name	Position	Seasons at Iowa	Alma mater
Hayden Fry	Head coach	5th	Baylor (1951)
Bill Brashier	Defensive coordinator	5th	North Texas State (1952)
Bill Snyder	Offensive coordinator/Quarterbacks	5th	William Jewell (1963)
Dan McCarney	Defensive Line	7th	Iowa (1975)
Barry Alvarez	Linebackers	5th	Nebraska (1969)
Don Patterson	Tight Ends	5th	Army (1973)
Carl Jackson	Running Backs	5th	Prairie View A&M (1963)
Kirk Ferentz	Offensive Line	3rd	Connecticut (1978)
Del Miller	Offensive assistant	6th	Central (IA) (1972)
Bernie Wyatt	Defensive Ends/Recruiting Coordinator	10th	Iowa (1962)
Bill Dervrich	Strength and Conditioning	4th	West Chester State (1975)
Bob Stoops	Graduate Assistant	1st	Iowa (1983)

Five of the staff would go on to become the winningest head coaches at five different programs: Snyder (Kansas State), Alvarez (Wisconsin), Stoops (Oklahoma), McCarney (Iowa State) and Ferentz (Iowa)

== Statistical achievements ==
The offense broke 35 school records, including:

- 5,647 yards of total offense and 470.6 per game
- 3,239 passing yards
- 713 yards of total offense in a game vs Northwestern (10/8/83).
- 517 rushing yards and seven rushing touchdowns in a game vs Minnesota (11/19/83)
- 575 passing yards against Northwestern (10/8/83).

The team's individual statistical leaders included:

- Quarterback Chuck Long completed 157 of 265 passes (59.2%) for 2,601 yards. He also set a single-game Iowa passing record (broken by Long the following year) with 420 passing yards against Northwestern on October 8, 1983.
- Running back Owen Gill led the team with 798 rushing yards.
- Wide receiver Dave Moritz led the team with 50 receptions for 912 yards. Dave Chappel set a single-game Iowa receiving record (since broken) with 11 receptions for 192 yards against Indiana on October 29, 1983.
- Kicker Tom Nichol led the team with 86 points scored on 14 field goals and 44 extra points.
- Defensive back Mike Stoops led the team with six interceptions for 154 yards.
- Linebacker Larry Station led the team with 138 total tackles.

== Awards and honors ==
Six Iowa players received first-team honors on the 1983 All-Big Ten Conference football team: quarterback Chuck Long (AP-1, UPI-1); (AP-1, UPI-1); offensive tackle John Alt (AP-1); defensive tackle Paul Hufford (AP-1, UPI-1); linebacker Larry Station (AP-1, UPI-1); defensive back Mike Stoops (AP-2, UPI-1); and wide receiver Dave Moritz (AP-1).

The team had three most valuable players: fullback Norm Granger; quarterback Chuck Long; and wide receiver Dave Moritz. The team also had three captains: fullback Norm Granger; offensive guard Jon Roehlk; and defensive end Dave Stroebel.

== 1984 NFL draft ==
Player	Position	Round	Pick	NFL club
John Alt	Tackle	1	21	Kansas City Chiefs
Joel Hilgenberg	Center	4	97	New Orleans Saints
Norm Granger	Running Back	5	137	Dallas Cowboys
Joe Levelis	Guard	6	166	Dallas Cowboys
Dave Moritz	Wide Receiver	10	275	San Francisco 49ers
