= 1983 Illinois Fighting Illini football team =

American college football season

1983 Illinois Fighting Illini football

Big Ten champion

Rose Bowl, L 9–45 vs. UCLA
- Conference: Big Ten Conference

Ranking
- Coaches: No. 10
- AP: No. 10
- Record: 10–2 (9–0 Big Ten)
- Head coach: Mike White (4th season)
- Captains: Tim Brewster; Joe Miles; Don Thorp
- Home stadium: Memorial Stadium

1983 Big Ten Conference football standings
| | Conf. | | | | | Overall |
| Team | W | | L | | T | W | | L | | T |
|---|---|---|---|---|---|---|---|---|---|---|
| No. 10 Illinois $ | 9 | – | 0 | – | 0 | 10 | – | 2 | – | 0 |
| No. 8 Michigan | 8 | – | 1 | – | 0 | 9 | – | 3 | – | 0 |
| No. 14 Iowa | 7 | – | 2 | – | 0 | 9 | – | 3 | – | 0 |
| No. 9 Ohio State | 6 | – | 3 | – | 0 | 9 | – | 3 | – | 0 |
| Wisconsin | 5 | – | 4 | – | 0 | 7 | – | 4 | – | 0 |
| Purdue | 3 | – | 5 | – | 1 | 3 | – | 7 | – | 1 |
| Michigan State | 2 | – | 6 | – | 1 | 4 | – | 6 | – | 1 |
| Indiana | 2 | – | 7 | – | 0 | 3 | – | 8 | – | 0 |
| Northwestern | 2 | – | 7 | – | 0 | 2 | – | 9 | – | 0 |
| Minnesota | 0 | – | 9 | – | 0 | 1 | – | 10 | – | 0 |
$ – Conference champion; Rankings from AP Poll

The 1983 Illinois Fighting Illini football team represented the University of Illinois as a member of the Big Ten Conference during the Big Ten football season. In their fourth year under head coach Mike White, the Fighting Illini compiled a 10–2 record (9–0 in conference games), won the Big Ten championship, and outscored opponents by a total of 338 to 168. Illinois represented the Big Ten in the 1984 Rose Bowl, losing to UCLA by a 45–9 score. The Illini were ranked No. 4 in the AP poll at the end of the regular season, but dropped to No. 10 in the final poll after losing the Rose Bowl.

Quarterback Jack Trudeau led the Big Ten with 203 complete passes, a 62.7% completion percentage, and 2,446 passing yards. The team's other statistical leaders included running back Thomas Rooks (842 rushing yards), wide receiver David Williams (59 receptions for 870 yards), and kicker Chris White (78 points, 39 of 40 extra points, 13 of 22 field goals).

Defensive end Don Thorp was selected as the team's most valuable player and also received the Chicago Tribune Silver Football trophy as the most valuable player in the Big Ten Conference.

The team played its home games at Memorial Stadium in Champaign, Illinois.

== Schedule ==
| Date | Time | Opponent | Rank | Site | TV | Result | Attendance | Source |
|---|---|---|---|---|---|---|---|---|
| September 10 | 1:30 pm | at Missouri* | | Faurot Field; Columbia, MO (rivalry) | | L 18–28 | 53,744 | |
| September 17 | 6:00 pm | Stanford* | | Memorial Stadium; Champaign, IL | | W 17–7 | 72,852 | |
| September 24 | 11:30 am | at Michigan State | | Spartan Stadium; East Lansing, MI | ABC | W 20–10 | 75,867 | |
| October 1 | 1:00 pm | No. 4 Iowa | | Memorial Stadium; Champaign, IL | | W 33–0 | 73,351 | |
| October 8 | 1:30 pm | at Wisconsin | No. 19 | Camp Randall Stadium; Madison, WI | | W 27–15 | 78,307 | |
| October 15 | 1:00 pm | No. 6 Ohio State | No. 19 | Memorial Stadium; Champaign, IL (Illibuck) | | W 17–13 | 73,414 | |
| October 22 | 1:30 pm | at Purdue | No. 11 | Ross–Ade Stadium; West Lafayette, IN (rivalry) | | W 35–21 | 69,328 | |
| October 29 | 11:30 am | No. 8 Michigan | No. 9 | Memorial Stadium; Champaign, IL (rivalry) | CBS | W 16–6 | 76,127 | |
| November 5 | 7:00 pm | at Minnesota | No. 6 | Hubert H. Humphrey Metrodome; Minneapolis, MN | | W 50–23 | 35,514 | |
| November 12 | 1:00 pm | Indiana | No. 5 | Memorial Stadium; Champaign, IL (rivalry) | | W 49–21 | 73,612 | |
| November 19 | 1:00 pm | at Northwestern | No. 4 | Dyche Stadium; Evanston, IL (rivalry) | | W 56–24 | 52,333 | |
| January 2 | 4:00 pm | vs. UCLA* | No. 4 | Rose Bowl; Pasadena, CA (Rose Bowl) | NBC | L 9–45 | 103,217 | |
*Non-conference game; Rankings from AP Poll released prior to the game; All times are in Central time

== Awards and honors ==
- Don Thorp (defensive end)
  - Chicago Tribune Silver Football (Big Ten MVP)
  - All-American, (defensive end)
- Jim Juriga, (tackle)
  - All-American, (tackle)
- Craig Swoope, (defensive back)
  - All-American, (defensive back)

Seven Illinois players received first-team honors on the 1983 All-Big Ten Conference football team: running back Dwight Beverly (AP-1, UPI-1); guard Jim Juriga (AP-1, UPI-1); tackle Chris Babyar (AP-1, UPI-1); defensive linemen Mark Butkus (AP-1, UPI-1) and Don Thorp (AP-1, UPI-1); defensive back Craig Swoope (AP-1, UPI-1); and kicker Chris White (AP-2, UPI-1).
