= 1983 Northwestern Wildcats football team =

American college football season

1983 Northwestern Wildcats football
- Conference: Big Ten Conference
- Record: 2–9 (2–7 Big Ten)
- Head coach: Dennis Green (3rd season)
- Captains: Mike Guendling; Todd Jenkins
- Home stadium: Dyche Stadium

1983 Big Ten Conference football standings
	Conf.					Overall
Team	W		L		T	W		L		T
No. 10 Illinois $	9	–	0	–	0	10	–	2	–	0
No. 8 Michigan	8	–	1	–	0	9	–	3	–	0
No. 14 Iowa	7	–	2	–	0	9	–	3	–	0
No. 9 Ohio State	6	–	3	–	0	9	–	3	–	0
Wisconsin	5	–	4	–	0	7	–	4	–	0
Purdue	3	–	5	–	1	3	–	7	–	1
Michigan State	2	–	6	–	1	4	–	6	–	1
Indiana	2	–	7	–	0	3	–	8	–	0
Northwestern	2	–	7	–	0	2	–	9	–	0
Minnesota	0	–	9	–	0	1	–	10	–	0
$ – Conference champion; Rankings from AP Poll

The 1983 Northwestern Wildcats team represented Northwestern University during the 1983 NCAA Division I-A football season. In their third year under head coach Dennis Green, the Wildcats compiled a 2–9 record (2–7 against Big Ten Conference opponents) and finished in a tie for eighth place in the Big Ten Conference.

The team's offensive leaders were quarterback Sandy Schwab with 1,838 passing yards, Ricky Edwards with 561 rushing yards, and Ricky Edwards with 570 receiving yards. Punter John Kidd received first-team All-Big Ten honors from both the Associated Press and the United Press International.

== Schedule ==
Date	Opponent	Site	Result	Attendance	Source
September 10	No. 19 Washington*	Dyche Stadium; Evanston, IL	L 0–34	26,165	
September 17	at Syracuse*	Carrier Dome; Syracuse, NY	L 0–35	25,979	
September 24	at Indiana	Memorial Stadium; Bloomington, IN	W 10–8	40,347	
October 1	Wisconsin	Dyche Stadium; Evanston, IL	L 0–49	32,180	
October 8	at No. 15 Iowa	Kinnick Stadium; Iowa City, IA	L 21–61	66,125	
October 15	at No. 13 Michigan	Michigan Stadium; Ann Arbor, MI (rivalry)	L 0–35	103,914	
October 22	Minnesota	Dyche Stadium; Evanston, IL	W 19–8	21,411	
October 29	at Purdue	Ross–Ade Stadium; West Lafayette, IN	L 17–48	60,134	
November 5	Michigan State	Dyche Stadium; Evanston, IL	L 3–9	27,463	
November 12	at No. 10 Ohio State	Ohio Stadium; Columbus, OH	L 7–55	88,703	
November 19	No. 4 Illinois	Dyche Stadium; Evanston, IL (rivalry)	L 24–56	52,333	
*Non-conference game; Rankings from AP Poll released prior to the game

== Roster ==
- QB Sandy Schwab, Soph.
- DL Tom Flaherty, Soph.
