= 1983 Michigan State Spartans football team =

American college football season

1983 Michigan State Spartans football
- Conference: Big Ten Conference
- Record: 4–6–1 (2–6–1 Big Ten)
- Head coach: George Perles (1st season)
- Defensive coordinator: Nick Saban (1st season)
- MVP: Carl Banks
- Captain: Carl Banks
- Home stadium: Spartan Stadium

1983 Big Ten Conference football standings
	Conf.					Overall
Team	W		L		T	W		L		T
No. 10 Illinois $	9	–	0	–	0	10	–	2	–	0
No. 8 Michigan	8	–	1	–	0	9	–	3	–	0
No. 14 Iowa	7	–	2	–	0	9	–	3	–	0
No. 9 Ohio State	6	–	3	–	0	9	–	3	–	0
Wisconsin	5	–	4	–	0	7	–	4	–	0
Purdue	3	–	5	–	1	3	–	7	–	1
Michigan State	2	–	6	–	1	4	–	6	–	1
Indiana	2	–	7	–	0	3	–	8	–	0
Northwestern	2	–	7	–	0	2	–	9	–	0
Minnesota	0	–	9	–	0	1	–	10	–	0
$ – Conference champion; Rankings from AP Poll

The 1983 Michigan State Spartans football team was an American football team that represented Michigan State University as a member of the Big Ten Conference during the 1983 Big Ten football season. In their first season under head coach George Perles, the Spartans compiled a 4–6–1 record (2–6–1 in conference games), finished in seventh place in the Big Ten, and were outscored by a total of 233 to 162. In four games against ranked opponents, they defeated No. 4 Notre Dame, and lost to No. 14 Michigan, No. 17 Ohio State, and No. 12 Iowa.

On offense, the Spartans gained an average of 102.4 rushing yards and 116.8 passing yards per game. On defense, and with Nick Saban in his first season as the Spartans' defensive coordinator, they held opponents to an average of 136.5 rushing yards and 192.5 passing yards per game. The team's statistical leaders included quarterback Clark Brown with 837 passing yards, Carl Butler with 549 rushing yards, Daryl Turner with 28 receptions and 549 receiving yards, and kicker Ralf Mojsiejenko with 46 points scored (11 of 17 field goals, 13 of 17 extra points).

Linebacker Carl Banks received first-team honors from the Associated Press (AP), the United Press International (UPI), NEA and Sporting News on the 1983 All-America college football team. Three Spartans were recognized by the AP and/or the UPI on the 1983 All-Big Ten Conference football team: Banks (AP-1; UPI-1); defensive back Phil Parker (AP-2; UPI-1); and kicker Mojsiejenko (AP-2). Banks was selected by his teammates as the team's most valuable player for the 1982 season.

The team played its home games at Spartan Stadium in East Lansing, Michigan.

== Schedule ==
Date	Opponent	Site	Result	Attendance	Source
September 10	Colorado*	Spartan Stadium; East Lansing, MI	W 23–17	56,835	
September 17	at No. 4 Notre Dame*	Notre Dame Stadium; Notre Dame, IN (rivalry)	W 28–23	59,075	
September 24	Illinois	Spartan Stadium; East Lansing, MI	L 10–20	75,867	
October 1	at Purdue	Ross–Ade Stadium; West Lafayette, IN	T 29–29	69,203	
October 8	No. 14 Michigan	Spartan Stadium; East Lansing, MI (rivalry)	L 0–42	78,033	
October 15	at Indiana	Memorial Stadium; Bloomington, IN (rivalry)	L 12–24	46,088	
October 22	at No. 17 Ohio State	Ohio Stadium; Columbus, OH	L 11–21	89,104	
October 29	Minnesota^{†}	Spartan Stadium; East Lansing, MI	W 34–10	76,481	
November 5	at Northwestern	Dyche Stadium; Evanston, IL	W 9–3	27,463	
November 12	No. 12 Iowa	Spartan Stadium; East Lansing, MI	L 6–12	72,528	
November 19	at Wisconsin	Camp Randall Stadium; Madison, WI	L 0–32	54,204	
*Non-conference game; ^{†}Homecoming; Rankings from AP Poll released prior to the game

== Game summaries ==
=== Purdue ===
Team	1	2	3	4	Total
Michigan St	13	3	10	3	29
Purdue	3	13	0	13	29

- Date: October 1
- Location: Ross–Ade Stadium, West Lafayette, Indiana

Scoring summary
1	PUR	Clark 42-yard field goal	PUR 3-0
1	MSU	Butler 82-yard pass from Brown (kick failed)	MSU 6-3
1	MSU	Turner 44-yard pass from Brown (Mojsiejenko kick)	MSU 13-3
2	MSU	Mojsiejenko 42-yard field goal	MSU 16-3
2	PUR	Clark 42-yard field goal	MSU 16-6
2	PUR	Campbell 4-yard run (Clark kick)	MSU 16-13
2	PUR	Clark 22-yard field goal	Tied 16-16
3	MSU	Manley 5-yard run (Mojsiejenko kick)	MSU 23-16
3	MSU	Mojsiejenko 34-yard field goal	MSU 26-16
4	PUR	Hawthorne 10-yard pass from Campbell (kick failed)	MSU 26-22
4	PUR	Brunner 15-yard pass from Campbell (Clark kick)	PUR 29-26
4	MSU	Mojsiejenko 59-yard field goal	Tied 29-29

== Roster ==
1983 Michigan State Spartans football team roster
Players
Coaches
Offense

Pos.	#	Name	Class
TE	34	Tom Robinson	Sr

Defense

Pos.	#	Name	Class
LB	54	Carl Banks	Sr
S	32	Phil Parker	So
DE	93	Kelly Quinn	So

Special teams

Pos.	#	Name	Class
P/K	2	Ralf Mojsiejenko	Jr

Head coach

- George Perles

Coordinators/assistant coaches

Legend

- (C) Team captain
- (S) Suspended
- (I) Ineligible
- Injured
- Redshirt

== Team players drafted into the NFL ==
Player	Position	Round	Pick	NFL club
Carl Banks	Linebacker	1	3	New York Giants
Daryl Turner	Wide receiver	2	49	Seattle Seahawks
Scott Auer	Tackle	9	229	Kansas City Chiefs
