= Ken Campbell (American football) =

American football player (born 1938)

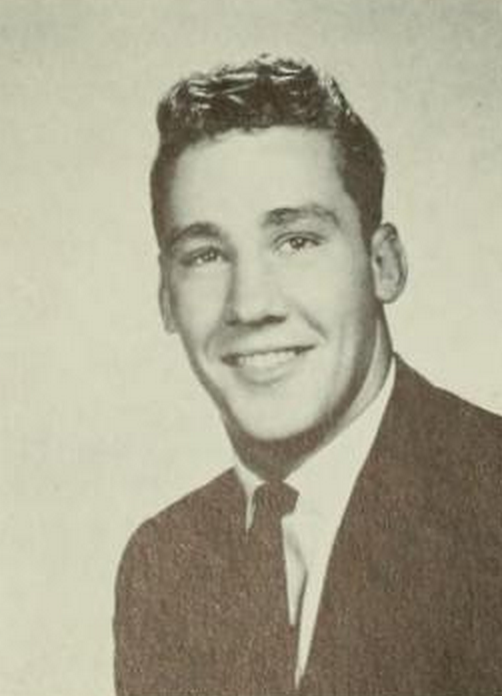
- Campbell at West Chester, c. 1960

No. 82
- Position: End

Personal information
- Born: 1938 (age 87–88)
- Listed height: 6 ft 1 in (1.85 m)
- Listed weight: 213 lb (97 kg)

Career information
- High school: Columbia
- College: West Chester

Career history
- New York Titans (1960)
- Stats at Pro Football Reference

Robert Kenneth Campbell (born 1938) is an American former professional football player who was an end with the New York Titans of the American Football League (AFL). He played college football for the West Chester Golden Rams. He is the father of Scott Campbell, who was also a football player. Campbell also served as athletic director and a coach at Hershey High School.
