= Norm Granger =

American football player (born 1961)

No. 28, 32
- Position: Fullback

Personal information
- Born: September 14, 1961 (age 65); Newark, New Jersey, U.S.
- Listed height: 5 ft 9 in (1.75 m)
- Listed weight: 225 lb (102 kg)

Career information
- High school: Barringer (Newark)
- College: Iowa
- NFL draft: 1984: 5th round, 137th overall pick

Career history
- Dallas Cowboys (1984–1986); Atlanta Falcons (1987)

Career NFL statistics
- Rushing yards: 12
- Rushing average: 2
- Receptions: 2
- Receiving yards: 34
- Stats at Pro Football Reference

Norman Lance Granger (born September 14, 1961) is an American former professional football player who was a fullback in the National Football League (NFL) for the Dallas Cowboys and Atlanta Falcons. He played college football for the Iowa Hawkeyes.

== Early life ==
Granger was born and raised in Newark, New Jersey, where he graduated from Barringer High School as part of the class of 1980, where he was a teammate of future NFL player Andre Tippett.

He was a high school All-American running back, who posted 1,900 rushing yards and 13 touchdowns as a senior. He also received the Newark Academic Scholar-Athlete Award.

== College career ==
Granger accepted a football scholarship from the University of Iowa. He was moved to fullback after being recruited as a running back, even though blocking wasn't his strength, he had above average running and receiving skills for that position.

In his first year, he was used returning kickoffs and led the Big Ten Conference by posting 329 yards (29.9-yard average). He became a starter as a sophomore and contributed to the team reaching the Rose Bowl, where he basically was the only offensive weapon in an 0-28 loss, tallying 80 rushing yards on 13 carries. That season, he returned a kickoff 99 yards for a touchdown against Indiana University.

The next year, he registered 352 rushing yards and 260 receiving yards. He also had a 63-yard reception for a touchdown against Indiana University.

As a senior, he became the first player in school history to captain the football team for two years. Although he only gained 429 rushing yards (6.9 yards per carry), he was still named team co-MVP. He finished his college career with 1,058 rushing yards on 191 attempts (5.5-yard average), 43 receptions for 389 yards and 7 total touchdowns.

== Professional career ==
=== Dallas Cowboys ===
Granger was selected by the Dallas Cowboys in the fifth round (137th overall) of the 1984 NFL draft. As a rookie, he made the team after the retirement of Robert Newhouse, as he was seen as a similar player in physical dimensions. He played in 15 games as a special teams player.

In 1985, he was projected as the backup to Fullback Timmy Newsome, but was released on August 27, after he was passed on the depth chart by Todd Fowler. He was re-signed as a free agent in 1986, but was placed on the injured reserve list on August 19.

=== Atlanta Falcons ===
After the players went on a strike on the third week of the 1987 season, those games were canceled (reducing the 16 game season to 15) and the NFL decided that the games would be played with replacement players. Granger was signed to be a part of the Atlanta Falcons replacement team. He played in three games (1 start), before being released at the end of the strike.

== Personal life ==
In 2014, he recovered the Rose Bowl ring that was stolen from him at the end of his sophomore campaign. He worked as a Black Hawk County Supervisor and as a residential officer in Waterloo, before being named the vice chairman of the Iowa Board of Parole. Granger married in 1985 to Leila VanArsdale and they have three daughters.
