= Bruce King (American football) =

American football player (born 1963)

No. 46, 49
- Position: Fullback

Personal information
- Born: January 7, 1963 (age 63); Mariah Hill, Indiana, U.S.
- Listed height: 6 ft 1 in (1.85 m)
- Listed weight: 219 lb (99 kg)

Career information
- High school: Heritage Hills (Lincoln City, Indiana)
- College: Purdue
- NFL draft: 1985: 5th round, 126th overall pick

Career history
- Kansas City Chiefs (1985–1986); Buffalo Bills (1986–1987); Miami Dolphins (1988)*
- * Offseason or practice squad member only

Awards and highlights
- Indiana Football Hall of Fame (2022); Purdue Team Captain (1984); Peach Bowl (1984)

Career NFL statistics
- Rushing yards: 121
- Rushing average: 3
- Receptions: 8
- Receiving yards: 48
- Stats at Pro Football Reference

Bruce King (born January 7, 1963) is an American former professional football player who was a fullback in the National Football League (NFL). He played college football for the Purdue Boilermakers and was selected by the Kansas City Chiefs in the fifth round of the 1985 NFL draft. He also played for the Buffalo Bills.

== Early life ==
King graduated from Heritage Hills High School, where he helped lead the Patriots to a 3-year record of 25–5 (1978 season 6–4, 1979 season 9–1, 1980 season 10–0), were consistently ranked in the Top Ten and won 2 PAC conference titles. A two-way player (Running Back & Linebacker), King was an Indiana North-South All-Star, winning MVP honors. He was named to All-Region, All-State and All-American teams; spurning offers from the Michigan Wolverines and Ohio State Buckeyes, he accepted a scholarship to play football for Jim Young and study engineering at Purdue University.

Following his collegiate career, he was awarded the Rabold Award from the Indiana Football Coaches Association for "Excellence in College Football," joining the ranks of other award winners such as Mark Herrmann, Rod Woodson, Darrick Brownlow, Kevin Hardy, Roosevelt Colvin, Jay Cutler and Anthony Spencer.

A multi-sport athlete, he helped led the Patriots to their first (of 11) IHSAA Sectional Titles during the 1979-80 basketball season. He also lettered in baseball and track & field.

In 2022, he was selected for induction into the Indiana Football Hall of Fame.

== College career ==
King attended Purdue University for four years; he was selected as Captain for his senior season and helped lead Purdue to the 1984 Peach Bowl, during which he led the Boilermakers in total offense. He averaged 5.6 yards per attempt; totaling over 1,100 yards and scoring 7 touchdowns during his Purdue career before graduating in 1985 with a bachelor's degree in management. He was a 3-year starter, blocking for future NFL great Mel Gray and Jim Everett. Fellow offensive backfield teammates were future Pittsburgh Steelers running back Rodney Carter, Eric Jordan of the Oakland Invaders and Ray Wallace of the Houston Oilers and Pittsburgh Steelers. He led the Boilers in All-Purpose Yardage during the 1984 Peach Bowl.

== Professional career ==
King was selected by the Oakland Invaders of the USFL in the 8th round of the 1985 draft but chose to sign with the Kansas City Chiefs of the NFL, having been taken by the Chiefs in the 5th round of the NFL draft, as the 126th player taken overall. King started 6 games as a rookie fullback with the Chiefs, gaining 83 yards. He was traded to the Buffalo Bills 4 games into the 1986 season. He spent the entire 1987 season with the Bills, gaining 28 yards in 2 starts. After the end of the 1987 NFL players strike and a try-out with the Miami Dolphins, he retired from professional football.
