= Randy Rasmussen (American football, born 1960) =

American football player (born 1960)

No. 60, 52
- Positions: Center, guard

Personal information
- Born: September 27, 1960 (age 66); Minneapolis, Minnesota, U.S.
- Listed height: 6 ft 2 in (1.88 m)
- Listed weight: 253 lb (115 kg)

Career information
- High school: Irondale (New Brighton, Minnesota)
- College: Minnesota
- NFL draft: 1984: 8th round, 220th overall pick

Career history
- Pittsburgh Steelers (1984–1986); Minnesota Vikings (1987–1989)

Awards and highlights
- Second-team All-Big Ten (1982)

Career NFL statistics
- Games played: 43
- Games started: 3
- Stats at Pro Football Reference

Randy Rasmussen (September 27, 1960) is an American former professional football player who played offensive lineman for five seasons for the Pittsburgh Steelers and Minnesota Vikings He was selected 220th overall by the Steelers in the eighth round of the 1984 NFL draft.
