= Don Thorp =

American football player (born 1962)

No. 96, 62, 71
- Position: Defensive end

Personal information
- Born: July 10, 1962 (age 64); Buffalo Grove, Illinois, U.S.
- Listed height: 6 ft 4 in (1.93 m)
- Listed weight: 260 lb (118 kg)

Career information
- High school: Buffalo Grove
- College: Illinois
- NFL draft: 1984: 6th round, 156th overall pick

Career history
- New Orleans Saints (1984); Chicago Bears (1986)*; New York Jets (1987)*; Indianapolis Colts (1987–1988); Kansas City Chiefs (1988); Miami Dolphins (1989)*
- * Offseason or practice squad member only

Awards and highlights
- First-team All-American (1983); Big Ten Most Valuable Player (1983); Big Ten Player of the Year (1983); First-team All-Big Ten (1983)

Career NFL statistics
- Sacks: 3
- Stats at Pro Football Reference

Donald Kevin Thorp (born July 10, 1962) is an American former professional football player who was a defensive end in the National Football League (NFL) for the New Orleans Saints, Indianapolis Colts and Kansas City Chiefs.

Thorp was born in Chicago, Illinois, and played scholastically at Buffalo Grove High School. He played college football for the Illinois Fighting Illini, where he was named a first-team All-American by the Football Writers Association of America in 1983.

Thorp was selected by the Saints in the sixth-round of the 1984 NFL draft. He appeared in five games for the Saints during the 1984 season, then was out of professional football in 1985 and 1986. He resumed his career as a replacement player with the Colts during the 1987 NFLPA strike, playing sparingly through 1988.
