= Thad Jemison =

American football player (born 1961)

No. 72, 14
- Position: Wide receiver

Personal information
- Born: December 24, 1961 (age 64); Cincinnati, Ohio, U.S.
- Listed height: 6 ft 2 in (1.88 m)
- Listed weight: 195 lb (88 kg)

Career information
- High school: Princeton (Sharonville, Ohio)
- College: Ohio State (1980–1983)
- NFL draft: 1984: 12th round, 310th overall pick

Career history
- Tampa Bay Buccaneers (1984)*; New Jersey Generals (1985)*; Edmonton Eskimos (1985)*; Toronto Argonauts (1985); Ottawa Rough Riders (1985); Edmonton Eskimos (1986)*
- * Offseason or practice squad member only

Thad Jemison (born December 24, 1961) is an American former football wide receiver. He played college football at Ohio State, and was selected by the Tampa Bay Buccaneers in the 12th round of the 1984 NFL draft. He played professionally in the Canadian Football League (CFL).

== Early life ==
Thad Jemison was born on December 24, 1961, in Cincinnati, Ohio. He played high school football at Princeton High School in Sharonville, Ohio. He was a defensive back on the 1978 team that won the state title. As a senior in 1979, Jemison recorded 659 receiving yards and nine receiving touchdowns, earning all-state honors. Jemison also lettered in basketball and track in high school.

== College career ==
Jemison played college football for the Ohio State Buckeyes from 1980 to 1983. Through his first three seasons, he only had 15 total receptions. He saw more playing time as a senior in 1983 after the graduation of Gary Williams. Jemison had 27 catches for 427 yards and two touchdowns during the 1983 season. In the 1984 Fiesta Bowl, he caught eight passes for 131 yards and a 39-yard touchdown with 39 seconds left to help Ohio State win 28–23. Jemison majored in business from 1980 to 1982 before switching to economics in 1983. He finished his OSU degree in 2009.

== Professional career ==
Jemison was selected by the Tampa Bay Buccaneers in the 12th round, with the 310th overall pick, of the 1984 NFL draft. He was waived on August 27, 1984.

Jemison signed with the New Jersey Generals of the United States Football League (USFL) in December 1984. He was released on February 19, 1985, before the start of the 1985 USFL season.

Jemison then signed with the Edmonton Eskimos of the Canadian Football League (CFL). In late June 1985, he was traded to the Toronto Argonauts for Richard Tharpe. Jemison dressed in five games for Toronto during the 1985 CFL season, catching eight passes for 80 yards while also returning two kickoffs for 43 yards before being released.

In early October 1985, Jemison was signed to a 21-day trial by the CFL's Ottawa Rough Riders. He played in one regular season game for the Rough Riders, recording five receptions for 59 yards. He also played in the team's Eastern Semi-Final loss to the Montreal Concordes. Jemison was later released on June 21, 1986.

Jemison then signed with the Eskimos again, and was moved to the practice roster before the start of the 1986 CFL season. He was released from the practice roster on July 15, 1986.

== Coaching career ==
Jemison later became a football coach with over 20 years of experience at the high school level. He also had a stint as an assistant at Kent State.
