= Steve Bradley (American football) =

American football player (born 1963)

No. 12
- Position: Quarterback

Personal information
- Born: July 16, 1963 (age 63)
- Listed height: 6 ft 2 in (1.88 m)
- Listed weight: 216 lb (98 kg)

Career information
- High school: Knox (Knox, Indiana)
- College: Indiana
- NFL draft: 1986: 12th round, 316th overall pick

Career history
- Cincinnati Bengals (1986)*; Chicago Bears (1987)
- * Offseason or practice squad member only

Career NFL statistics
- Passing attempts: 18
- Passing completions: 6
- Completion percentage: 33.3%
- TD–INT: 2–3
- Passing yards: 77
- Passer rating: 45.1
- Stats at Pro Football Reference

Steven Carl Bradley (born July 16, 1963) is an American former professional football player who was a quarterback in the National Football League (NFL). He was selected by the Cincinnati Bengals in the 12th round of the 1986 NFL draft. He played for the Chicago Bears. He played college football for the Indiana Hoosiers.

== Indiana Hoosiers ==
=== Passing ===
Year	Cmp	Att	Pct	Yds	Y/A	AY/A	TD	Int	Rate
1983	182	355	51.3	2298	6.5	5.1	14	17	109.1
1984	208	402	51.7	2544	6.3	4.6	10	20	103.2
1985	142	266	53.4	1737	6.5	4.8	11	15	110.6

=== Rushing ===
Year	Att	Yds	Avg	TD
1983	66	108	1.6	1
1984	77	17	0.2	2
1985	79	239	3.0	4

== Chicago Bears ==
Season	G	GS	Comp	Att	Pct	Yds	Avg	TD	Int	Rate
1987	1	-	6	18	33.3	77	4.3	2	3	45.1
