= Randy Wright =

American football player (born 1961)

No. 16
- Position: Quarterback

Personal information
- Born: January 12, 1961 (age 65); Austin, Texas, U.S.
- Listed height: 6 ft 2 in (1.88 m)
- Listed weight: 200 lb (91 kg)

Career information
- High school: St. Charles (St. Charles, Illinois)
- College: Wisconsin
- NFL draft: 1984: 6th round, 153rd overall pick

Career history
- Green Bay Packers (1984–1988); Pittsburgh Steelers (1990)*
- * Offseason or practice squad member only

Career NFL statistics
- Passing attempts: 1,119
- Passing completions: 602
- Completion percentage: 53.8%
- TD–INT: 31–57
- Passing yards: 7,106
- Passer rating: 61.4
- Stats at Pro Football Reference

Randall Steven Wright (born January 12, 1961) is an American former professional football player who was a quarterback for the Green Bay Packers from 1984 to 1988. In 2016, USA Today named Wright the worst starting quarterback in Packers' history. After his playing career, he became a color commentator and covered Big Ten football for ESPN for 12 years.

== High school ==
Randy Wright attended St. Charles High School in St. Charles, Illinois. He is a member of the St. Charles Saints Hall of Fame. He attended Acton-Boxborough Regional High School in Acton, Massachusetts as a sophomore (1976–1977). He was the Colonial's starting quarterback.

== College career ==
Wright played college football at the University of Wisconsin–Madison in Madison.

== Professional career ==
Wright was occasionally the starting quarterback in the 1985 season, sharing the role with Jim Zorn and Lynn Dickey. Wright played the entire 1986 NFL season as the starter and shared starting quarterback duties with his successor, Don Majkowski, from 1987 to 1988.

== NFL career statistics ==
Legend
**Bold**	Career high

Year	Team	Games			Passing									Rushing					Sacks	
Year	Team	GP	GS	Record	Cmp	Att	Pct	Yds	Y/A	Lng	TD	Int	Rtg	Att	Yds	Avg	Lng	TD	Sck	Yds
1984	GNB	8	1	1–0	27	62	43.5	310	5.0	56	2	6	30.4	8	11	1.4	5	0	4	17
1985	GNB	5	1	0–1	39	74	52.7	552	**7.5**	38	2	4	63.6	8	8	1.0	8	0	8	67
1986	GNB	**16**	**16**	**4–12**	**263**	**492**	53.5	**3,247**	6.6	62	**17**	**23**	**66.2**	**18**	41	2.3	18	1	**33**	**243**
1987	GNB	9	7	1–6	132	247	53.4	1,507	6.1	**66**	6	11	61.6	13	**70**	**5.4**	**27**	0	20	128
1988	GNB	8	7	1–6	141	244	**57.8**	1,490	6.1	51	4	13	58.9	8	43	**5.4**	19	**2**	20	148
Career		46	32	7–25	602	1,119	53.8	7,106	6.4	66	31	57	61.4	55	173	3.1	27	3	85	603
