= Cliff Benson =

American football player (born 1961)

No. 87, 83, 88, 86
- Position: Tight end

Personal information
- Born: August 28, 1961 (age 65); Chicago, Illinois, U.S.
- Listed height: 6 ft 4 in (1.93 m)
- Listed weight: 238 lb (108 kg)

Career information
- High school: Alan B. Shepard (Palos Heights, Illinois)
- College: Purdue
- NFL draft: 1984: 5th round, 132nd overall pick

Career history
- Atlanta Falcons (1984–1985); San Francisco 49ers (1987)*; Washington Redskins (1987); New Orleans Saints (1987-1988); Chicago Bears (1989)*
- * Offseason or practice squad member only

Awards and highlights
- Super Bowl champion (XXII); First-team All-Big Ten (1982)

Career NFL statistics
- Receptions: 39
- Receiving yards: 297
- Stats at Pro Football Reference

Clifford Anthony Benson (born August 28, 1961) is an American former professional football player who was a tight end in the National Football League (NFL) for the Atlanta Falcons, Washington Redskins, and New Orleans Saints. He was selected by the Falcons in the fifth round of the 1984 NFL draft. He played for Alan B. Shepard High School in Palos Heights, Illinois. He played college football for the Purdue Boilermakers and was selected in the fifth round of the 1984 NFL draft.
