= Keith Byars =

American football player (born 1963)

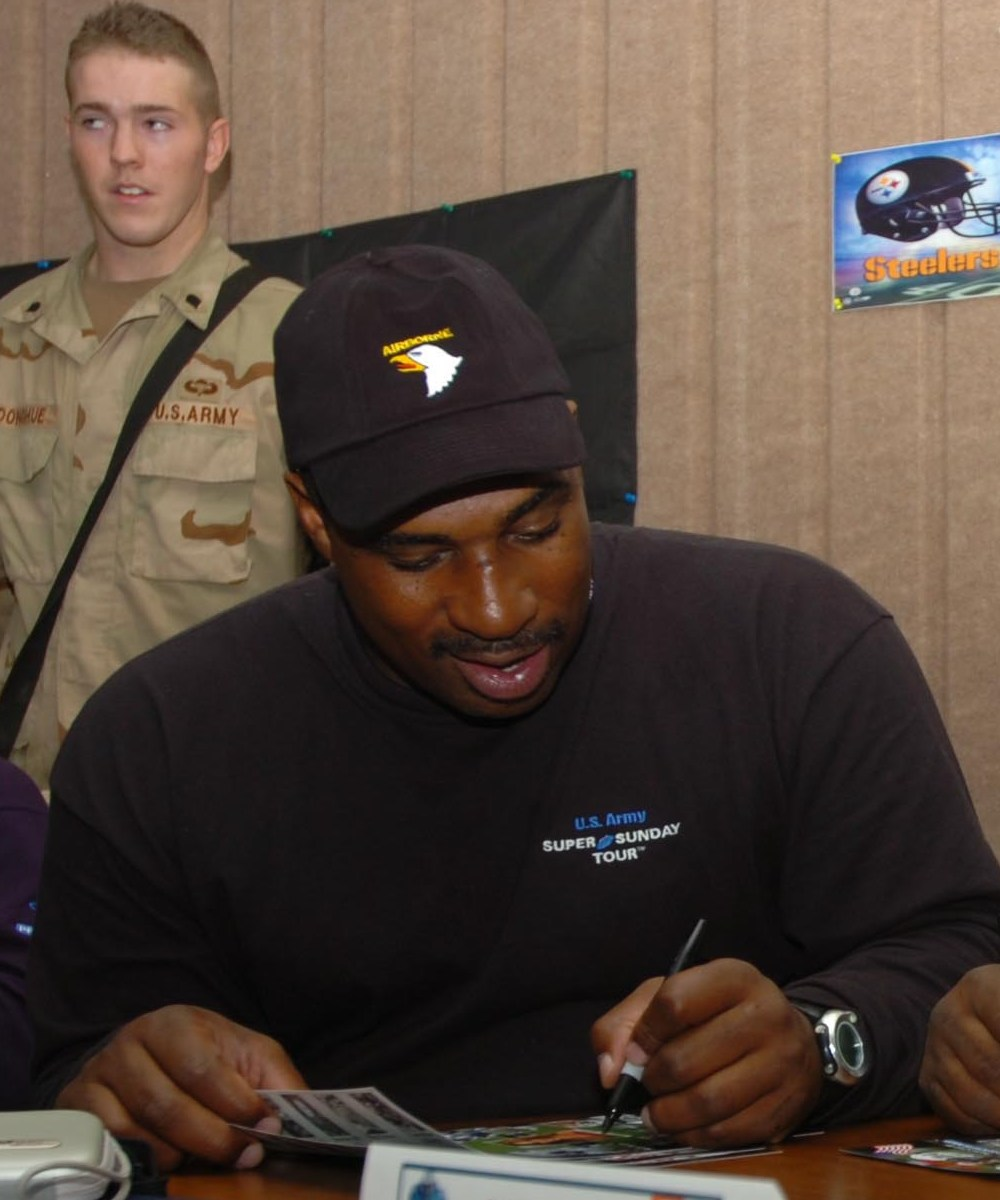
- Byars in 2006

No. 42, 41
- Positions: Fullback, tight end

Personal information
- Born: October 14, 1963 (age 63); Dayton, Ohio, U.S.
- Listed height: 6 ft 1 in (1.85 m)
- Listed weight: 245 lb (111 kg)

Career information
- High school: Roth (Dayton); Trotwood-Madison (Trotwood, Ohio)
- College: Ohio State (1982–1985)
- NFL draft: 1986: 1st round, 10th overall pick

Career history
- Philadelphia Eagles (1986–1992); Miami Dolphins (1993–1996); New England Patriots (1996–1997); New York Jets (1998)

Awards and highlights
- Pro Bowl (1993); Philadelphia Eagles 75th Anniversary Team; Unanimous All-American (1984); Second-team All-American (1983); Big Ten Most Valuable Player (1984); Big Ten Player of the Year (1984); 2× First-team All-Big Ten (1983, 1984)

Career NFL statistics
- Rushing attempts: 865
- Rushing yards: 3,109
- Rushing touchdowns: 23
- Receptions: 610
- Receiving yards: 5,661
- Receiving touchdowns: 31
- Stats at Pro Football Reference
- College Football Hall of Fame

Keith Alan Byars (born October 14, 1963) is an American sports broadcaster and former professional football player. He played as a fullback and tight end in the National Football League (NFL) for the Philadelphia Eagles, Miami Dolphins, New England Patriots and New York Jets. He was selected in the first round by the Eagles in the 1986 NFL draft. He played college football for the Ohio State Buckeyes.

== Early life ==
Byars attended high school at the now-defunct Roth High School in Dayton, Ohio and Trotwood Madison High School, in Trotwood, Ohio. He excelled in football alongside basketball, baseball and track and field. He made the All-City baseball team as an outfielder in his senior year while being a starter on two consecutive state championship basketball teams (with the 1980-81 Roth team being considered one of the best Ohio high school basketball teams ever) and state relay teams. He was inducted into the Ohio Basketball Hall of Fame in 2020. As a football player, he ran for over 1,500 yards despite missing two games due to injury.

== College career ==
Byars was a tailback with the Ohio State Buckeyes from 1982 to 1985, under head coach Earle Bruce.

In 1984, Byars finished second in the Heisman Trophy voting (behind Doug Flutie) after a season where he gained an OSU record 2,441 all-purpose yards, including a then-school record 1,764 rushing yards and 22 touchdowns. That season featured a game against Illinois (Ohio State won this game 45–38 on October 13, 1984) in which Byars led a comeback from a 24–0 deficit, rushing for 274 yards and five touchdowns, the last with 36 seconds remaining in the game. On his fourth touchdown run, going for 67 yards, he famously lost his left shoe at the Illini 40 but never broke stride. Byars was a unanimous All-American selection, and voted the Big Ten Conference Most Valuable Player. His running backs coach that year was a young Jim Tressel, who would later become the Buckeyes' head coach.

Byars was a preseason favorite for the 1985 Heisman, but fractured the bone in his right foot near the little toe in preseason practice. He missed the first five games of the 1985 season, and returned too early. He reinjured the broken bone in his second game back and missed the remainder of the regular season. He attempted to return for the Citrus Bowl game on December 28 but injured his foot again in the second Ohio State offensive series of the game.

Despite losing almost his entire senior year, Byars finished his college career at Ohio State with 4,369 total yards, 3,200 rushing yards, and 50 touchdowns. His 50 touchdowns remain the second most in school history. He was inducted into the College Football Hall of Fame in 2020.

Byars' stats with the Ohio State Buckeyes
	Rushing				Receiving			
YEAR	ATT	YDS	AVG	TD	NO.	YDS	AVG	TD
1982	6	24	4.0	0	1	20	20.0	0
1983	222	1,199	5.4	20	23	359	15.6	1
1984	336	1,764	5.3	22	42	479	11.4	2
1985	55	213	3.9	4	7	44	6.3	0
Totals	619	3,200	5.2	46	72	882	12.3	3

== Professional career ==
Byars was selected by the Philadelphia Eagles with the tenth overall pick in the first round of the 1986 NFL Draft. As a professional, he played running back, fullback and tight end for the Philadelphia Eagles (1986–1992), Miami Dolphins (1993–1996), New England Patriots (1996–1997), and the New York Jets (1998). Byars was selected to the Pro Bowl in 1993.

A superb rusher, blocker, and pass receiver, Byars was a vital contributor for every team he played on. In 1988, he rushed for 517 yards, recorded 71 receptions (ranking him 9th in the NFL), and scored 10 touchdowns. In the Eagles' 20–12 loss to the Chicago Bears in the postseason, he rushed for 34 yards and caught 9 passes for 103 yards. In 1990, he recorded 81 receptions for 819 yards, the third most receptions in the NFL, rushed for 141 yards, and even completed 4 of 4 passes for 53 yards and 4 touchdowns. In the 1996 season, Byars made his first and only championship appearance, playing with the Patriots in Super Bowl XXXI. 33-year-old Byars had a good performance in the game, catching 4 passes for 42 yards and a touchdown. Byars recorded a reception in 130 consecutive games from 1987 (November 1) to 1996 (September 8), which was 5th most in league history.

Byars played one year as a member of the New York Jets in 1998. He helped the Jets reach the AFC Championship Game versus the Denver Broncos. He caught three passes for 33 yards but had one of New York's four turnovers with a fumble as the Jets were outscored 23–7 in the second half.

In his 13 seasons, Byars rushed for 3,109 yards, caught 610 passes for 5,661 yards, returned five kickoffs for 94 yards, and completed 6 of 13 passes for 119 yards and six touchdowns, with one interception. He also scored 54 touchdowns (23 rushing and 31 receiving). His six passing touchdowns are the third highest total by a running back in NFL history. His 610 receptions are the 15th most catches by all running back/tight ends and he is one of only two in the top 15 to have played primarily as a fullback.

== NFL career statistics ==
Legend
**Bold**	Career high

=== Regular season ===
Year	Team	Games		Rushing					Receiving				
Year	Team	GP	GS	Att	Yds	Avg	Lng	TD	Rec	Yds	Avg	Lng	TD
1986	PHI	**16**	8	**177**	**577**	3.3	32	1	11	44	4.0	17	0
1987	PHI	10	8	116	426	3.7	30	3	21	177	8.4	30	1
1988	PHI	**16**	**16**	152	517	3.4	52	**6**	72	705	9.8	37	4
1989	PHI	**16**	15	133	452	3.4	16	5	68	721	**10.6**	**60**	0
1990	PHI	**16**	15	37	141	3.8	23	0	**81**	**819**	10.1	54	3
1991	PHI	**16**	**16**	94	383	4.1	28	1	62	564	9.1	37	3
1992	PHI	15	15	41	176	4.3	23	1	56	502	9.0	46	2
1993	MIA	**16**	**16**	64	269	4.2	**77**	3	61	613	10.0	27	3
1994	MIA	9	9	19	64	3.4	12	2	49	418	8.5	34	**5**
1995	MIA	**16**	**16**	15	44	2.9	15	1	51	362	7.1	26	2
1996	MIA	4	4	0	0	0.0	0	0	5	40	8.0	16	0
1996	NWE	10	6	2	2	1.0	3	0	27	249	9.2	27	2
1997	NWE	**16**	8	11	24	2.2	5	0	20	189	9.5	51	3
1998	NYJ	13	8	4	34	**8.5**	13	0	26	258	9.9	29	3
		189	160	865	3,109	3.6	77	23	610	5,661	9.3	60	31

=== Playoffs ===
Year	Team	Games		Rushing					Receiving				
Year	Team	GP	GS	Att	Yds	Avg	Lng	TD	Rec	Yds	Avg	Lng	TD
1988	PHI	1	1	**7**	**34**	4.9	**13**	0	9	103	**11.4**	24	0
1989	PHI	1	0	0	0	0.0	0	0	9	68	7.6	17	0
1990	PHI	1	1	0	0	0.0	0	0	2	18	9.0	10	0
1992	PHI	2	2	0	0	0.0	0	0	9	68	7.6	15	0
1995	MIA	1	1	4	22	**5.5**	10	0	4	30	7.5	12	0
1996	NWE	**3**	**3**	3	9	3.0	7	0	**12**	**111**	9.3	**34**	**2**
1997	NWE	2	1	0	0	0.0	0	0	2	1	0.5	2	0
1998	NYJ	2	2	0	0	0.0	0	0	5	44	8.8	19	0
		13	11	14	65	4.6	13	0	52	443	8.5	34	2

== After retirement ==
Keith Byars is currently co-hosting a sports radio show with ESPN 1410 WING-AM in Dayton, Ohio where he is from—Byars hosts the show with Justin Kinner on Sunday mornings (Sunday Morning Sports) from 9-11am and he also broadcasts High School football on 101.5 HANK-FM for the Greater Western Ohio Conference (GWOC). http://www.wingam.com/shows/sunday-morning-sports-justin-kinner/

He is currently a television analyst for "New York Football Weekly" and This Week in Football on the YES Network.

He also coached the Boca Raton High School varsity football team in Boca Raton, Florida from 2009 to September 2011.

== See also ==
- List of NCAA major college football yearly rushing leaders
- List of NCAA major college football yearly scoring leaders
