= Gary Ellerson =

American football player (born 1963)

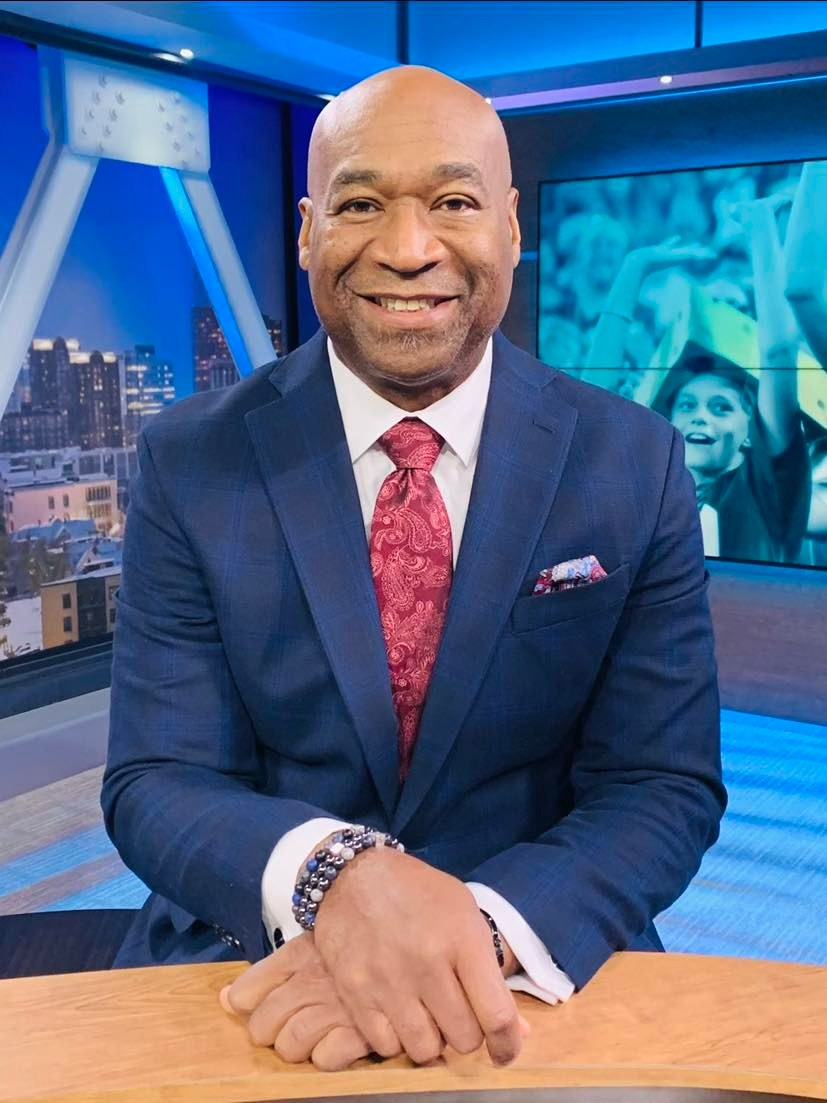

No. 42
- Position: Running back

Personal information
- Born: July 17, 1963 (age 63); Albany, Georgia, U.S.
- Listed height: 5 ft 11 in (1.80 m)
- Listed weight: 220 lb (100 kg)

Career information
- High school: Monroe (Albany, Georgia)
- College: Wisconsin
- NFL draft: 1985: 7th round, 182nd overall pick

Career history
- Memphis Showboats (1984); Green Bay Packers (1985–1986); Detroit Lions (1987)

Career NFL statistics
- Rushing yards: 688
- Rushing average: 4.1
- Total touchdowns: 9
- Stats at Pro Football Reference

Gary Tobius Ellerson (born July 17, 1963) is an American former professional football player with the University of Wisconsin–Madison, Green Bay Packers and Detroit Lions. He currently works as a Milwaukee, Wisconsin sports media personality.

== Early life ==
Ellerson attended Monroe High School from 1977 to 1981. He played football, was on the track team, and was in band. He received an Honorable Mention on the All Region Team in 1979-80 with 30 catches for 520 yards and 4 touchdowns. In 1980–81, he played on the Georgia All State First-team, All-Region First-team, and Georgia High School All-Star Game, and led AAAA in receiving yards at 42 catches for 820 yards and 9 touchdowns in 10 games.

In 2003, Ellerson was inducted into the Albany Georgia Sports Hall of Fame.

== College career ==
Ellerson was recruited by Alabama, Auburn, Florida State, Georgia, Miami, Tennessee, and Wisconsin. He chose the University of Wisconsin-Madison and enrolled in fall 1981. He played football there until 1984. From 1982 to 1983, his team led the Big Ten in kick-off return yardage and in 1982, he returned 19 kick-offs for 454 yards, averaging almost 24 yards per return. In 1983, he rushed for 820 yards on 161 carries and scored 12 rushing touchdowns. During his time in Madison, Ellerson and the Badgers played in two bowl games: a 7-point loss to Tennessee in the 1981 Garden State Bowl and an 11-point win in the 1982, Independence Bowl over Kansas State.

== Professional football career ==
Ellerson started his professional career as a running back in 1984 with the Memphis Showboats of the United States Football League, where he was a teammate of Reggie White. He re-entered the NFL draft in 1985 and was taken in the seventh round by the Packers. He spent the 1985 and 1986 seasons in Green Bay, tying a franchise record with eight kickoff returns in a single game, before being released during training camp of the 1987 season. He then signed with the Lions a short time later. Ellerson played in 8 games with the Lions in 1987, before a knee injury effectively ended his career.

== Post NFL career ==
Ellerson returned to college at UW-Whitewater to complete his liberal arts degree. His first job outside the NFL was on the football coaching staff at Brookfield East High School in Brookfield, Wisconsin, where he was running backs coach for the 1990 season, and defensive coordinator for the 1991-94 seasons. He also served as vice president of Big Brothers, Big Sisters in Milwaukee, in charge of community development, shortly after his playing career came to an end. Ellerson entered the car business at Braeger Chevrolet in Milwaukee for five years before embarking on a sports media career.

=== Sports Media: TV/Radio/Podcast ===
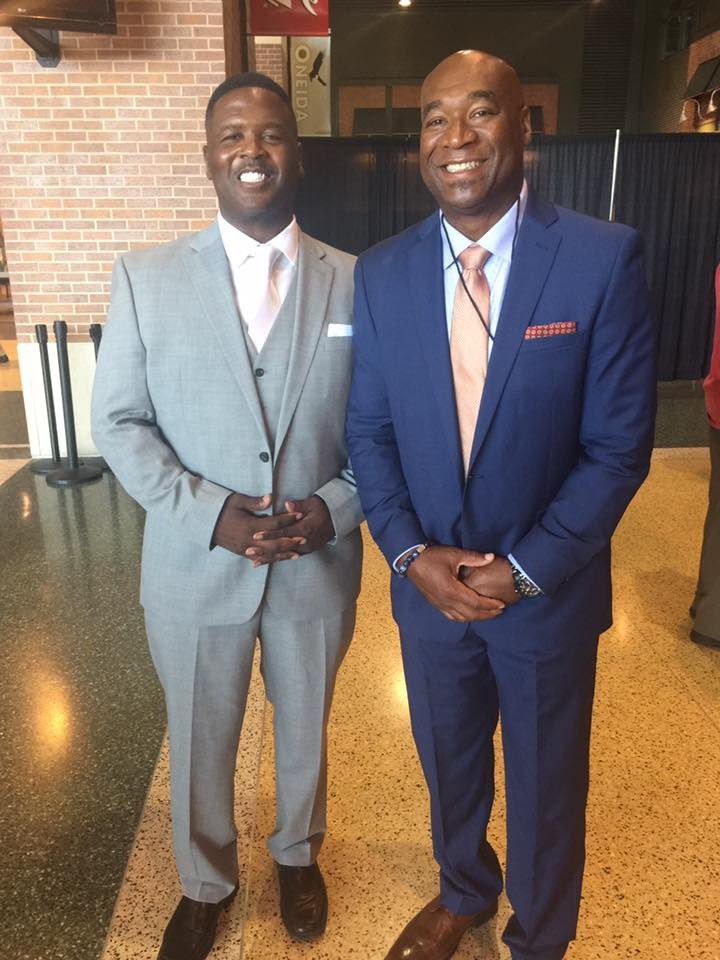
Gary Ellerson and LeRoy Butler at Packers Hall of Fame Banquet

Ellerson's began his media career working part-time at WISN (ABC affiliate) in Milwaukee, where he served as co-host of a postgame show – a rare live TV program that accepted phone calls from viewers. Ellerson then moved to WSSP radio 2005 where Ellerson was a co-hosts on the station's midday sports talk program, The Wendy's Big Show, alongside Steve "Sparky" Fifer and Pro Football Hall of Famer LeRoy Butler. Immediately following every Packers game, Ellerson co-hosted the Green & Gold Postgame Show on WSSP. WSSP 1250 AM went off the air on August 16, 2022.

Currently Ellerson can be found on various types of Broadcast media throughout the state of Wisconsin and around the world.

In television media, Ellerson co-hosts the Spectrum News sports show Roundtable with Dennis Krause and LeRoy Butler, talking Packers twice weekly during the Packers season. Following each Packers game, Ellerson and Krause team up for the Packers Post Game on Spectrum News. He also hosts his own weekly program on Milwaukee's CBS 58, Chalk Talk with Gary Ellerson.

Regarding radio media, on September 9, 2022, it was announced that Ellerson will be joining the Good Karma Brands launch of the Tundra Trio Radio Network which will air Green Bay Packers content across 94.5 ESPN (WKTI-FM) and Newsradio 620 WTMJ in Milwaukee and 100.5 ESPN (WTLX-FM) in Madison. Among his responsibilities, Ellerson will cohost a Packers pregame show with Greg Matzek.

In October 2022, Ellerson and Butler launched a podcast called "Leap 36: The Podcast" that can be found on all podcast platforms.

Ellerson has been a part of three Wisconsin Broadcasters' Association award-winning teams, one with Milwaukee's CBS 58 in 2009 for Best Sportscast for Television Large Market and twice with WSSP 1250AM for Best Radio Show for Large Market Radio - News/Talk, first in 2010 and then again in 2020.

IMDb records Ellerson as appearing in 4 NFL games during the 1986 and 1987 seasons, as well as the NFL Draft. Ellerson also appeared in The 60 Yard Line 2017 film.
