= Scott Campbell (gridiron football) =

American gridiron football player (born 1962)

No. 10, 14
- Position: Quarterback

Personal information
- Born: April 15, 1962 (age 64); Hershey, Pennsylvania, U.S.
- Listed height: 6 ft 0 in (1.83 m)
- Listed weight: 201 lb (91 kg)

Career information
- High school: Hershey
- College: Purdue
- NFL draft: 1984: 7th round, 191st overall pick

Career history
- Pittsburgh Steelers (1984–1986); Atlanta Falcons (1986-1990); Ottawa Rough Riders (1992)

Career NFL statistics
- Passing attempts: 454
- Passing completions: 224
- Completion percentage: 49.3%
- TD–INT: 19–25
- Passing yards: 2,983
- Passer rating: 61.6
- Stats at Pro Football Reference

Robert Scott Campbell (born April 15, 1962) is an American former professional football player who was a quarterback for six seasons in the National Football League (NFL) for the Pittsburgh Steelers and Atlanta Falcons. He was selected in the seventh round of the 1984 NFL draft by the Steelers. He appeared in 45 games in the NFL, starting 13. Campbell played college football for the Purdue Boilermakers. He backed up Mark Herrmann for one season, then started over Jim Everett for the next three years.

The Boilermakers' cumulative record during his time as a starter was 11-21-1 Overall, 9-16-1 Big Ten. The Boilers never finished higher than 6th in the league during this time.

== College statistics ==
- 1981: 2,686 yards with 18 TD vs 13 INT in 11 games.
- 1982: 2,626 yards with 14 TD vs 12 INT in 11 games.
- 1983: 2,031 yards with 12 TD vs 16 INT in 11 games.

== Personal life ==
Campbell is currently a real estate broker and owner of Brownstone Realty in Hershey, Pennsylvania.

His father, Ken Campbell is an American Football League (AFL) veteran who appeared in one game with the New York Titans during the 1960 season.
