= Mel Gray (return specialist) =

American football player (born 1961)

No. 37, 23, 21, 28
- Positions: Wide receiver, running back, return specialist

Personal information
- Born: March 16, 1961 (age 65); Williamsburg, Virginia, U.S.
- Listed height: 5 ft 9 in (1.75 m)
- Listed weight: 166 lb (75 kg)

Career information
- High school: Lafayette (Williamsburg, Virginia)
- College: Coffeyville (1980–1981); Purdue (1982–1983)
- Supplemental draft: 1984: 2nd round, 42nd overall pick

Career history
- Los Angeles Express (1984–1985); New Orleans Saints (1986–1988); Detroit Lions (1989–1994); Houston / Tennessee Oilers (1995–1997); Philadelphia Eagles (1997)

Awards and highlights
- 6× First-team All-Pro ( 1986, 1987, 1990, 1991, 1993, 1994); Second-team All-Pro (1992); 4× Pro Bowl (1990–1992, 1994); NFL kickoff return yards leader (1991); 2× NFL 1990s All-Decade Team; Detroit Lions 75th Anniversary Team; Detroit Lions All-Time Team; Second-team All-Big Ten (1982)

Career NFL statistics
- Return touchdowns: 9
- Punt return yards: 2,753
- Kick return yards: 10,250
- Stats at Pro Football Reference

Melvin Junius Gray (born March 16, 1961) is an American former professional football player who was a kick returner in the National Football League (NFL). He played with the New Orleans Saints, the Detroit Lions, the Houston/Tennessee Oilers, and the Philadelphia Eagles. He began his professional career for the Los Angeles Express of the United States Football League (USFL), following his college football career as a running back at Purdue. Gray attended Lafayette High School in Williamsburg, Virginia, where he was teammates with future NFL players Lawrence Taylor and Ron Springs.

Gray is widely considered to be one of the greatest return specialists of all time in the NFL. He holds the record for being the first, second, and third-oldest player to return a kickoff for a touchdown (33 years, 276 days; 33 years, 235 days; and 33 years, 221 days).

== Early life and college career ==
Gray was a standout athlete at Lafayette High School in Williamsburg, Virginia. He was named to the All-Peninsula District Track Team for the 200 meter dash as a senior and tied his school record in the 100 meter dash as a sophomore.

Upon graduation, Gray enrolled at Coffeyville Community College. In his freshman season, he was part of a backfield that helped lead the team to an 11–0 record and a #2 ranking in the NJCAA poll. He shared the backfield with future Heisman Trophy winner and NFL Pro Bowler Mike Rozier. In his sophomore season, Gray became the feature back and rushed for 1,397 yards and scored 20 touchdowns. He was the leading scorer in Junior College football and third in rushing. He was nominated for first-team all-Jayhawk Conference and all-American.

Gray then chose to attend Purdue over Pittsburgh who was also heavily recruiting him. He made an immediate impression on the staff, and the previous season's top 2 tailbacks were moved to other positions to accommodate for Gray becoming the feature back. Gray rushed for nearly 1,000 yards in each of the two seasons with the Boilermakers and was named 2nd team all- Big Ten in 1983. He only returned two kicks during his time at Purdue.

== Professional career ==
Gray was selected by the Chicago Blitz in the 7th round (133rd overall) of the 1984 USFL draft and immediately moved from tailback to wide receiver. A month after the draft, he was traded to the Los Angeles Express. In 1984, Gray scored the game-winning touchdown in the divisional playoffs against the Michigan Panthers. Gray broke his arm on the touchdown. The game lasted 4 hours, 3 minutes, went to 3 overtime, and became the longest pro football game in football history.

After the USFL folded in August 1986, Gray joined the New Orleans Saints who drafted him in the 1984 NFL Supplemental Draft of USFL and CFL players.

Gray is best known for his time with the Detroit Lions. The Lions were in contention for the NFC Central title each season during the early 1990s—teams that featured the running back Barry Sanders. However, Gray was an integral part of a dominant Lions' special teams group that proved to be instrumental to the team's success during that era. In six seasons with the Lions (1989–94), Gray played in 84 games and returned 216 kickoffs for 5,478 yards (25.4 avg) and registered five touchdowns, and he returned 132 punts for 1,427 yards (10.8 avg) and had two touchdowns.

Gray is the franchise's all-time leader in career kickoff returns (216), career kickoff return yards (5,478), career kickoff returns for touchdowns (5), most kickoff returns for touchdowns in a season (3, 1994), highest kickoff return average in a season (28.36, 1994) and career punt return yards (1,427). His seven total returns for touchdowns (5 kickoff returns and 2 punt returns) rank third all-time in team history. Gray was a four-time Pro Bowl selection in Detroit (1991–93, 1995), and he was named All-Pro by numerous publications in each season from 1990 to 1994. In 1994, he returned his longest kickoff for a touchdown as a Lion with a 102-yard return for a score against Chicago on October 24. That season, he also returned 98-yard and 91-yard kickoffs for touchdowns.

Gray played the 1995 and 1996 seasons for the Houston Oilers. In Week 6 of 1996 against the Cincinnati Bengals, he returned 5 kickoffs for 177 yards and 3 punts for 86 yards; the 263 total return yards remains tied with Billy "White Shoes" Johnson for the franchise record as of 2019. When he left the game in 1997, after 12 seasons in pro football, Gray was atop several all-time NFL kick return lists. Gray was ranked fifth as one of the greatest return specialists on NFL Network's NFL Top 10 Return Aces.

== Personal life ==
After retirement, Gray continued to work on finishing his degree as well as substitute teaching for a short period. He is currently in real estate in the Houston area.
