= List of NCAA major college football yearly rushing leaders =

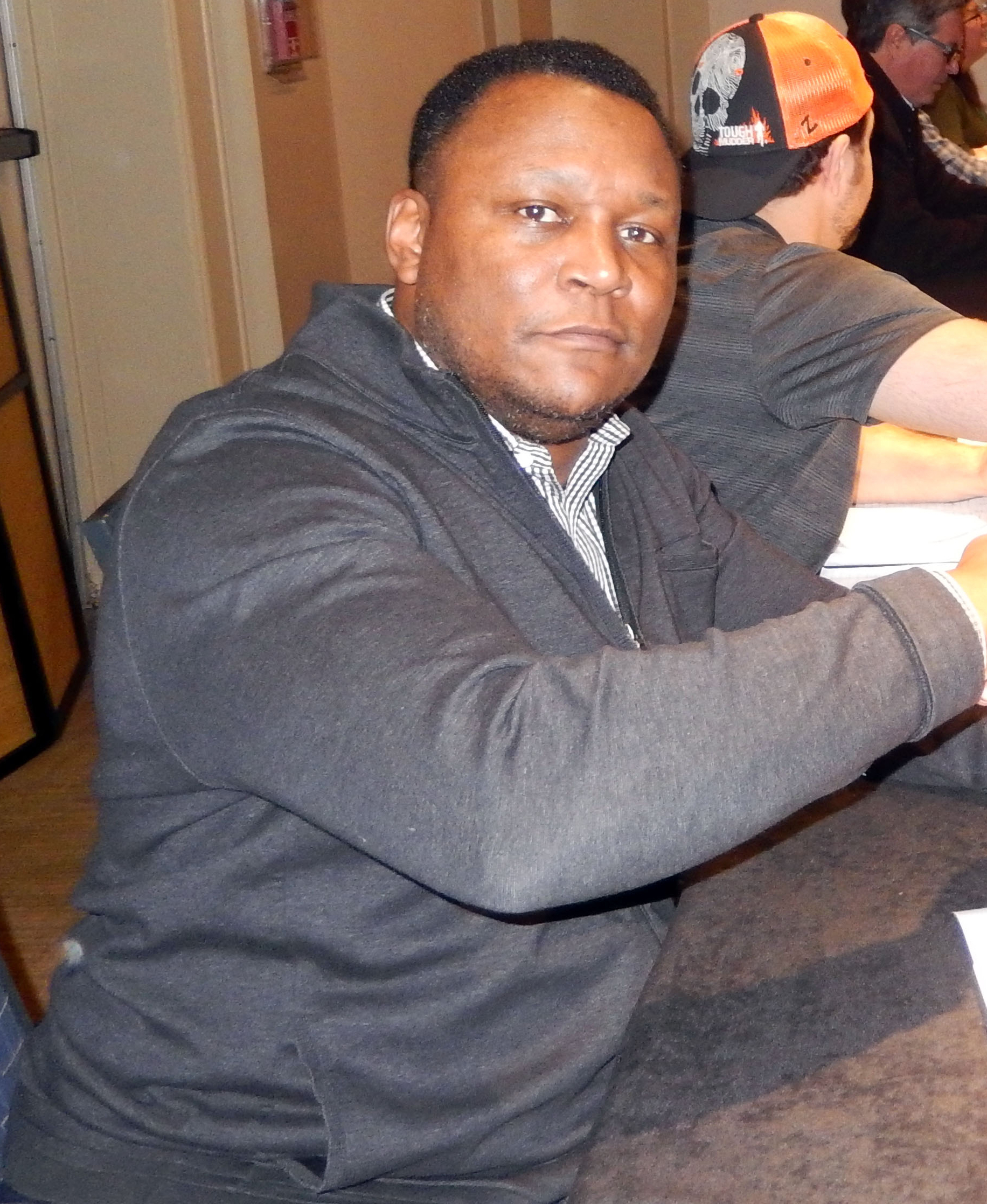
Oklahoma State halfback Barry Sanders, who set the single-season rushing yards record with 2,628.

The list of NCAA Division I FBS yearly rushing leaders identifies the top players in each season from 1937 to the present. It includes leaders in three statistical categories: rushing yards rushing touchdowns and rushing average (yards per carry).

NCAA statistics have been kept from 1937 to the present. In 1970, the NCAA officially changed the annual rushing leader to be determined by rushing yards per game rather than total rushing yards; for the purposes of this chart, total rushing yards remain the standard.

To qualify as a rushing average leader, a player must have averaged at least 6.25 rush attempts per school game. The 2020 COVID‑19 pandemic season is an exception, as many teams played shortened schedules.

Statistics are traditionally divided into three eras:

- Pre-modern statistical era (1937–1955): national leaders were recorded, but data collection was less standardized, and bowl game statistics were not included in season totals.
- Modern statistical era (1956–2001): season statistics were officially tracked consistently, although bowl games remained excluded from totals.
- Bowl stats included era (2002–present): season totals incorporate both regular-season and bowl game statistics.

== Rushing yards ==
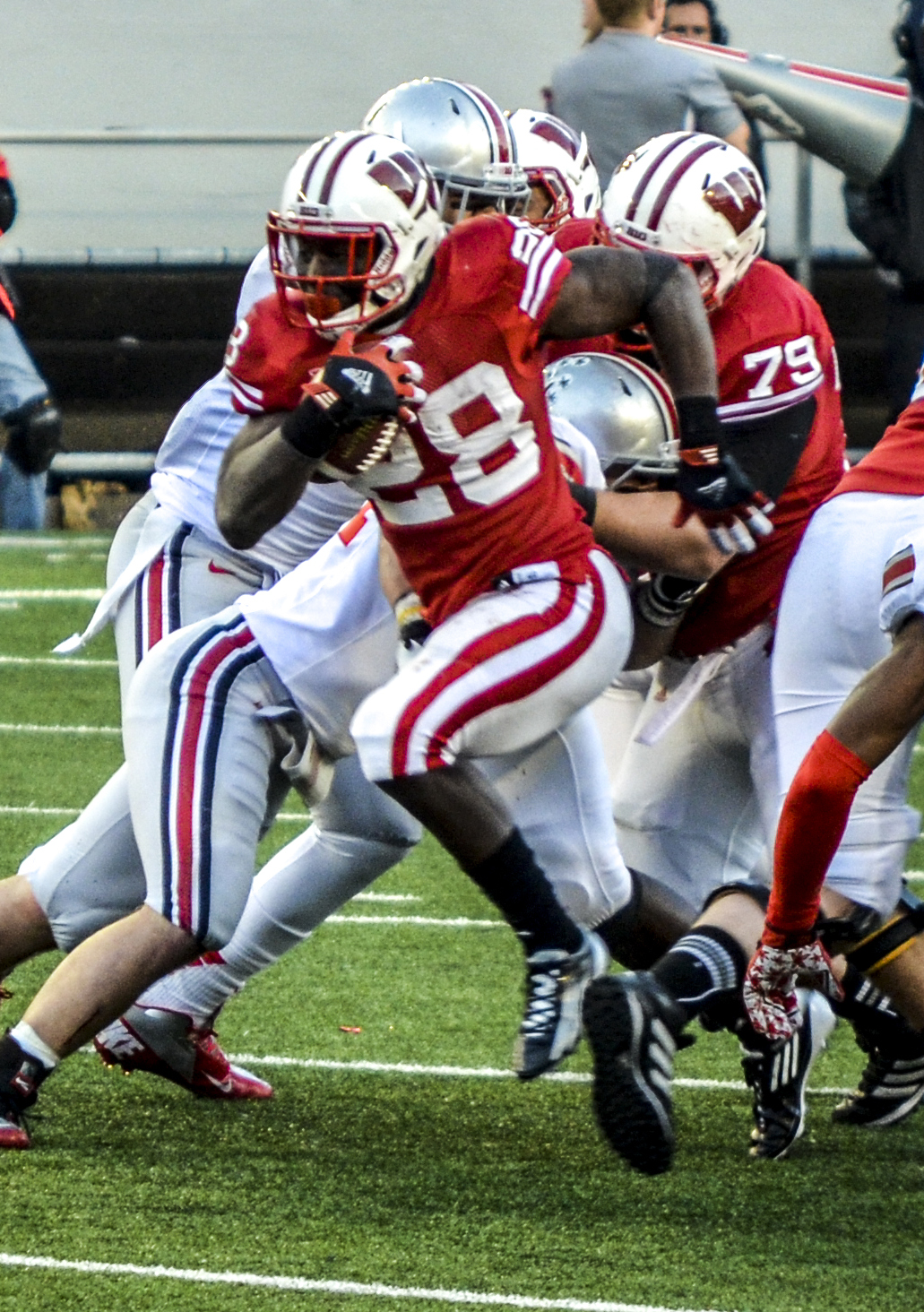
Wisconsin running back Montee Ball led FBS in 2011 with 1,923 rushing yards and 33 touchdowns.

Key
Symbol	Meaning
Leader	The player who recorded the most rushing yards in college football
Yds	The total number of rushing yards the player had
*	Set the single-season rushing yards record

College football yearly rushing yards leaders
Season	Leader	Yds	Team	Refs
1937	Byron White	1,121*	Colorado	
1938	Len Eshmont	831	Fordham	
1939	John Polanski	882	Wake Forest	
1940	Al Ghesquiere	957	Detroit	
1941	Frank Sinkwich	1,103	Georgia	
1942	Rudy Mobley	1,281*	Hardin–Simmons	
1943	Creighton Miller	911	Notre Dame	
1944	Wayne Williams	911	Minnesota	
1945	Bob Fenimore	1,048	Oklahoma A&M	
1946	Ruby Mobley (2)	1,262	Hardin–Simmons	
1947	Wilton Davis	1,173	Hardin–Simmons	
1948	Fred Wendt	1,570	Texas Mines	
1949	Kayo Dottley	1,312	Ole Miss	
1950	Wilford White	1,502	Arizona State	
1951	Ollie Matson	1,566	San Francisco	
1952	Howard Waugh	1,372	Tulsa	
1953	J. C. Caroline	1,256	Illinois	
1954	Art Luppino	1,359	Arizona	
1955	Art Luppino (2)	1,313	Arizona	
1956	Jim Crawford	1,104	Wyoming	
1957	Leon Burton	1,126	Arizona State	
1958	Dick Bass	1,361	Pacific	
1959	Pervis Atkins	971	New Mexico State	
1960	Bob Gaiters	1,338	New Mexico State	
1961	Preacher Pilot	1,278	New Mexico State	
1962	Preacher Pilot (2)	1,247	New Mexico State	
1963	Dave Casinelli	1,016	Memphis State	
1964	Brian Piccolo	1,044	Wake Forest	
1965	Mike Garrett	1,440	USC	
1966	Ray McDonald	1,329	Idaho	
1967	O. J. Simpson	1,415	USC	
1968	O. J. Simpson (2)	1,709*	USC	
1969	Leon Burns	1,659	Long Beach State	
1970	Don McCauley	1,720*	North Carolina	
1971	Ed Marinaro	1,881*	Cornell	
1972	Pete Van Valkenburg	1,386	BYU	
1973	Mark Kellar	1,719	Northern Illinois	
1974	Archie Griffin	1,620	Ohio State	
1975	Ricky Bell	1,875	USC	
1976	Tony Dorsett	1,948*	Pittsburgh	
1977	Earl Campbell	1,744	Texas	
1978	Obie Graves	1,789	Cal State Fullerton	
1979	Charles White	1,803	USC	
1980	George Rogers	1,781	South Carolina	
1981	Marcus Allen	2,342*	USC	
1982	Ernest Anderson	1,877	Oklahoma State	
1983	Mike Rozier	2,148	Nebraska	
1984	Keith Byars	1,655	Ohio State	
1985	Lorenzo White	1,908	Michigan State	
1986	Paul Palmer	1,866	Temple	
1987	Ickey Woods	1,658	UNLV	
1988	Barry Sanders	2,628*	Oklahoma State	
1989	Anthony Thompson	1,793	Indiana	
1990	Darren Lewis	1,691	Texas A&M	
1991	Vaughn Dunbar	1,699	Indiana	
1992	Marshall Faulk	1,630	San Diego State	
1993	LeShon Johnson	1,976	Northern Illinois	
1994	Rashaan Salaam	2,055	Colorado	
1995	Troy Davis	2,010	Iowa State	
1996	Troy Davis (2)	2,185	Iowa State	
1997	Ricky Williams	1,893	Texas	
1998	Ricky Williams (2)	2,124	Texas	
1999	LaDainian Tomlinson	1,850	TCU	
2000	LaDainian Tomlinson (2)	2,158	TCU	
2001	Chance Kretschmer	1,732	Nevada	
2002	Larry Johnson	2,087	Penn State	
2003	Darren Sproles	1,986	Kansas State	
2004	J. J. Arrington	2,018	California	
2005	DeAngelo Williams	1,964	Memphis	
2006	Garrett Wolfe	1,928	Northern Illinois	
2007	Kevin Smith	2,567	UCF	
2008	Donald Brown	2,083	Connecticut	
2009	Toby Gerhart	1,871	Stanford	
2010	LaMichael James	1,731	Oregon	
2011	Montee Ball	1,923	Wisconsin	
2012	Ka'Deem Carey	1,929	Arizona	
2013	Andre Williams	2,177	Boston College	
2014	Melvin Gordon	2,587	Wisconsin	
2015	Derrick Henry	2,219	Alabama	
2016	Donnel Pumphrey	2,133	San Diego State	
2017	Rashaad Penny	2,248	San Diego State	
2018	Jonathan Taylor	2,194	Wisconsin	
2019	Chuba Hubbard	2,094	Oklahoma State	
2020	Breece Hall	1,572	Iowa State	
2021	Lew Nichols III	1,848	Central Michigan	
2022	Brad Roberts	1,728	Air Force	
2023	Ollie Gordon II	1,732	Oklahoma State	
2024	Ashton Jeanty	2,601	Boise State	
2025	Cam Cook	1,659	Jacksonville State	

== Rushing touchdowns ==
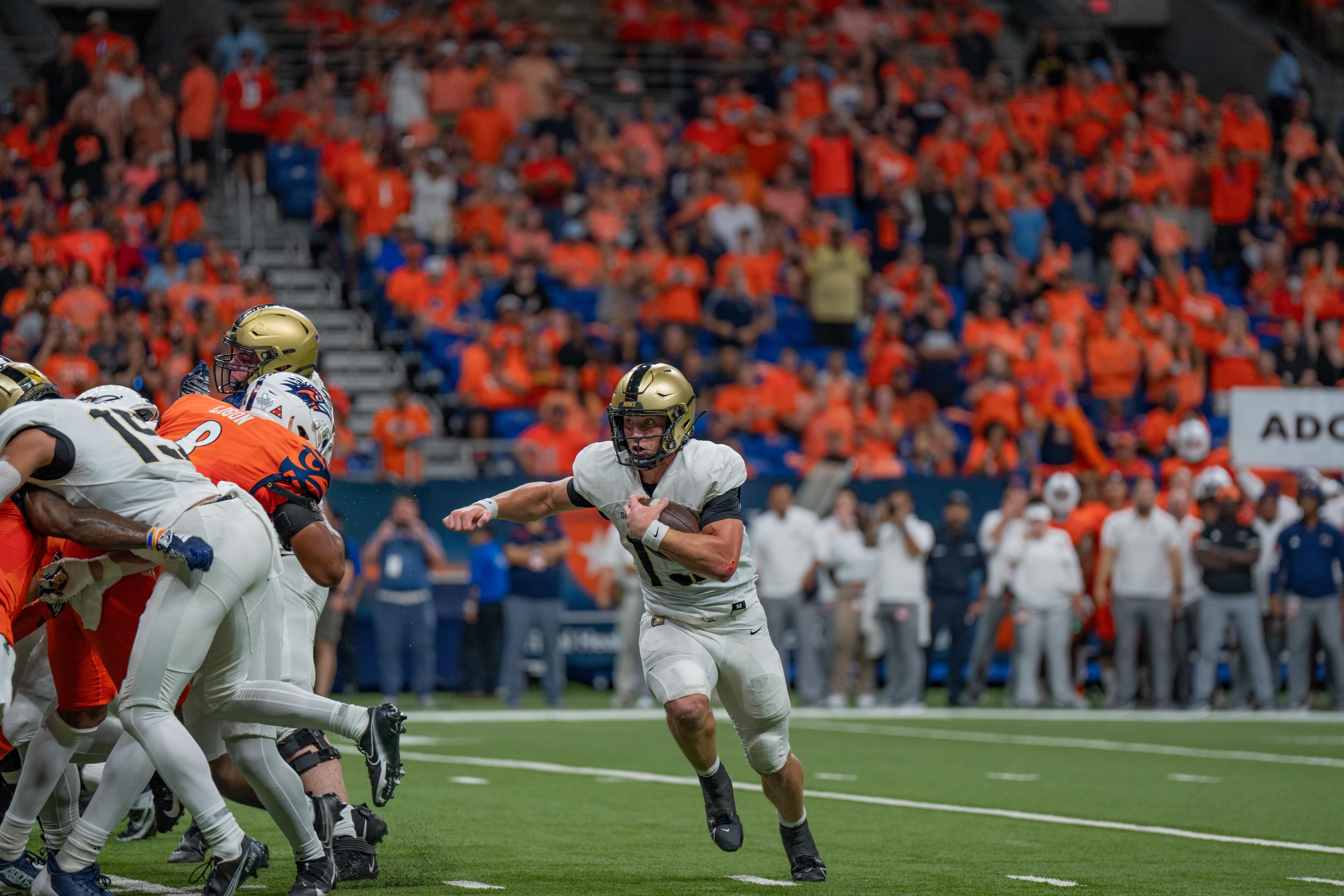
Army quarterback Bryson Daily, who led the FBS in 2024 with 32 rushing touchdowns, setting the NCAA single-season record for the position.

Key
Symbol	Meaning
Leader	The player who recorded the most rushing touchdowns in college football
TDs	The total number of rushing touchdowns the player had
*	Set the single-season rushing touchdowns record

College football yearly rushing touchdowns leaders
Season	Leader	TDs	Team	Refs
1937				
1938				
1939				
1940	Tom Harmon	15*	Michigan	
1941				
1942	Frank Sinkwich	17*	Georgia	
1943				
1944	Glenn Davis	14	Army	
1945	Doc Blanchard	16	Army	
1946				
1947				
1948	Fred Wendt	20*	Texas Mines	
1949				
1950				
1951				
1952				
1953				
1954	Art Luppino	21*	Arizona	
1955				
1956	Jim Brown	13	Syracuse	
1956	Clendon Thomas	13	Oklahoma	
1957	Bob Anderson	12	Army	
1957	Joe Belland	12	Arizona State	
1957	Leon Burton	12	Arizona State	
1958	Bill Austin	15	Rutgers	
1958	Dick Bass	15	Pacific	
1959	Pervis Atkins	13	New Mexico State	
1960	Bob Gaiters	23*	New Mexico State	
1961	Pete Pedro	21	West Texas State	
1962	Preacher Pilot	15	New Mexico State	
1963	Dave Casinelli	14	Memphis State	
1963	Cosmo Iacavazzi	14	Princeton	
1964	Brian Piccolo	15	Wake Forest	
1965	Bobby Burnett	16	Arkansas	
1966	Lee Jones	16	Buffalo	
1967	Butch Colson	15	East Carolina	
1968	O. J. Simpson	22	USC	
1969	Leon Burns	26*	Long Beach State	
1970	Brian Bream	19	Air Force	
1970	Leon Burns	19	Long Beach State	
1970	Don McCauley	19	North Carolina	
1971	Terry Metcalf	28*	Long Beach State	
1972	Champ Henson	20	Ohio State	
1973	J. J. Jennings	21	Rutgers	
1974	Keith Barnette	22	Boston College	
1975	Pete Johnson	24	Ohio State	
1976	Tony Dorsett	21	Pittsburgh	
1977	Earl Campbell	18	Texas	
1978	Billy Sims	20	Oklahoma	
1979	Billy Sims (2)	22	Oklahoma	
1980	Sammy Winder	20	Southern Miss	
1981	Marcus Allen	22	USC	
1982	Greg Allen	20	Florida State	
1983	Mike Rozier	29*	Nebraska	
1984	Keith Byars	22	Ohio State	
1985	Bernard White	18	Bowling Green	
1986	Steve Bartalo	19	Colorado State	
1987	Paul Hewitt	18	San Diego State	
1988	Barry Sanders	37*	Oklahoma State	
1989	Anthony Thompson	24	Indiana	
1990	Stacey Robinson	19	Northern Illinois	
1991	Marshall Faulk	21	San Diego State	
1992	Garrison Hearst	19	Georgia	
1993	Bam Morris	22	Texas Tech	
1994	Rashaan Salaam	24	Colorado	
1995	Eddie George	23	Ohio State	
1995	George Jones	23	San Diego State	
1996	Corey Dillon	22	Washington	
1997	Travis Prentice	25	Miami (OH)	
1997	Ricky Williams	25	Texas	
1998	Ricky Williams (2)	27	Texas	
1999	Shaun Alexander	19	Alabama	
1999	Ron Dayne	19	Wisconsin	
2000	Lee Suggs	27	Virginia Tech	
2001	Luke Staley	24	BYU	
2002	Willis McGahee	28	Miami (FL)	
2003	Cedric Benson	21	Texas	
2003	Kevin Jones	21	Virginia Tech	
2004	DeAngelo Williams	22	Memphis	
2005	LenDale White	24	USC	
2006	Ian Johnson	25	Boise State	
2007	Kevin Smith	29	UCF	
2008	MiQuale Lewis	22	Ball State	
2008	Javon Ringer	22	Michigan State	
2009	Toby Gerhart	28	Stanford	
2010	Chad Spann	22	Northern Illinois	
2011	Montee Ball	33	Wisconsin	
2012	Kenneth Dixon	27	Louisiana Tech	
2013	Kapri Bibbs	31	Colorado State	
2013	Keenan Reynolds	31	Navy	
2014	Melvin Gordon	29	Wisconsin	
2015	Derrick Henry	28	Alabama	
2016	Anthony Wales	27	Western Kentucky	
2017	Devin Singletary	32	Florida Atlantic	
2018	Travis Etienne	24	Clemson	
2019	LeVante Bellamy	23	Western Michigan	
2019	Xavier Jones	23	SMU	
2020	Najee Harris	26	Alabama	
2021	Rasheen Ali	23	Marshall	
2021	Tyler Allgeier	23	BYU	
2022	Israel Abanikanda	20	Pittsburgh	
2022	Mohamed Ibrahim	20	Minnesota	
2023	Blake Corum	27	Michigan	
2024	Bryson Daily	32	Army	
2025	Caleb Hawkins	25	North Texas	

== Rushing average ==
Key
Symbol	Meaning
Leader	The player who recorded the best yards per carry in college football
YPC	The total number of yards per carry the player had
*	Set the single-season rushing yards record

College football yearly rushing average leaders
Season	Leader	YPC	Team	Refs
1937	Dick Cassiano	9.0	Pittsburgh	
1938	Parker Hall	6.5	Ole Miss	
1939	Jackie Robinson	12.2	UCLA	
1940	James Farrell	7.2	Lafayette	
1941	Bob Steuber	7.6	Missouri	
1942	Bob Steuber (2)	7.4	Missouri	
1943	Bill Daley	6.8	Michigan	
1944	Glenn Davis	11.5	Army	
1945	Glenn Davis (2)	11.5	Army	
1946	Roger Stephens	7.7	Cincinnati	
1947	Jack Kurkowski	10.1	Detroit	
1948	Fred Wendt	8.53	Texas Mines	
1949	John Pont	7.6	Miami (OH)	
1950	Bobby Marlow	7.5	Alabama	
1950	Wilford White	7.5	Arizona State	
1951	Buck McPhail	8.56	Oklahoma	
1952	Howard Waugh	8.53	Tulsa	
1953				
1954	William Greenlaw	7.6	Nebraska	
1955	Art Luppino	6.28	Arizona	
1956	Tommy Lorino	8.4	Auburn	
1957	Leon Burton	9.6	Arizona State	
1958	Ray Jauch	7.0	Iowa	
1959	Billy Brown	7.8	New Mexico	
1960	Pervis Atkins	9.4	New Mexico State	
1961	Jimmy Saxton	7.9	Texas	
1962	Gale Sayers	7.1	Kansas	
1963	Tony Lorick	7.7	Arizona State	
1964	Tom Brown	6.4	Villanova	
1964	Don Kunit	6.4	Penn State	
1965	Harry Jones	7.7	Arkansas	
1966	MacArthur Lane	7.6	Utah State	
1967	Duane Thomas	7.2	West Texas State	
1968	Fred Willis	7.3	Boston College	
1969	Billy Walik	8.9	Villanova	
1970	Fred Henry	7.3	New Mexico	
1971	Greg Pruitt	9.4	Oklahoma	
1972	Wilbur Jackson	7.1	Alabama	
1973	Wilbur Jackson (2)	7.9	Alabama	
1974	Gralyn Wyatt	7.8	Texas	
1975	David Sims	8.2	Georgia Tech	
1976	Leroy Harris	7.0	Arkansas State	
1977	Henry White	7.9	Colgate	
1978	Kenny King	7.9	Oklahoma	
1979	Gwain Durden	7.8	Chattanooga	
1980	Buster Rhymes	7.7	Oklahoma	
1981	Tim Martin	6.8	Appalachian State	
1982	Mike Gunter	7.5	Tulsa	
1983	Mike Brown	8.5	Air Force	
1984	Kevin Lowe	8.0	Wyoming	
1985	Tom Rathman	7.5	Nebraska	
1986	Brent Fullwood	8.3	Auburn	
1987	Patrick Collins	7.6	Oklahoma	
1988	Chuck Weatherspoon	8.5	Houston	
1989	Chuck Weatherspoon (2)	9.6	Houston	
1990	Nikki Fisher	7.0	Virginia	
1991	Calvin Jones	8.3	Nebraska	
1992	Reggie Brooks	8.0	Notre Dame	
1993	Leeland McElroy	8.5	Texas A&M	
1994	Ki-Jana Carter	7.8	Penn State	
1995	Ahman Green	7.7	Nebraska	
1995	Lawrence Phillips	7.7	Nebraska	
1996	Robert Farmer	8.5	Notre Dame	
1997	Cecil Collins	8.3	LSU	
1998	Reuben Droughns	7.4	Oregon	
1999	LaDainian Tomlinson	6.9	TCU	
1999	Levron Williams	6.9	Indiana	
2000	Kenton Keith	7.8	New Mexico State	
2001	Santonio Beard	8.2	Alabama	
2002	Josh Cribbs	7.7	Kent State	
2002	Larry Johnson	7.7	Penn State	
2003	Matt Jones	7.4	Arkansas	
2003	Vince Young	7.4	Texas	
2004	DeAndra' Cobb	7.6	Michigan State	
2005	Reggie Bush	8.7	USC	
2006	Anthony Alridge	10.1	Houston	
2007	Percy Harvin	9.2	Florida	
2008	Shun White	8.3	Navy	
2009	Vai Taua	7.8	Nevada	
2010	Onterio McCalebb	8.5	Auburn	
2011	Henry Josey	8.1	Missouri	
2012	Dri Archer	9.0	Kent State	
2013	Elijah McGuire	8.4	UL Lafayette	
2014	Jhurell Pressley	9.5	New Mexico	
2015	Nick Chubb	8.1	Georgia	
2016	Ty Johnson	9.1	Maryland	
2017	Khalil Tate	9.2	Arizona	
2018	Darrell Henderson	8.9	Memphis	
2019	Lynn Bowden	7.9	Kentucky	
2020	Michael Carter	8.0 (Note: Carter played 11 games and led the group with 156 carries for 1,245 yards. Notable performances in COVID-shortened seasons include Bijan Robinson (Texas, 8.2 YPC in 9 games), Rachaad White (Arizona State, 10.0 YPC in 4 games), and Jake Funk (Maryland, 8.6 YPC in 5 games).)	North Carolina	
2021	Kendre Miller	7.5	TCU	
2022	John Lee Eldridge III	7.7	Air Force	
2023	Jayden Daniels	8.4	LSU	
2024	A. J. Turner	8.3	Marshall	
2025	Isaac Brown	8.8	Louisville	

== Pre-1937 unofficial data ==
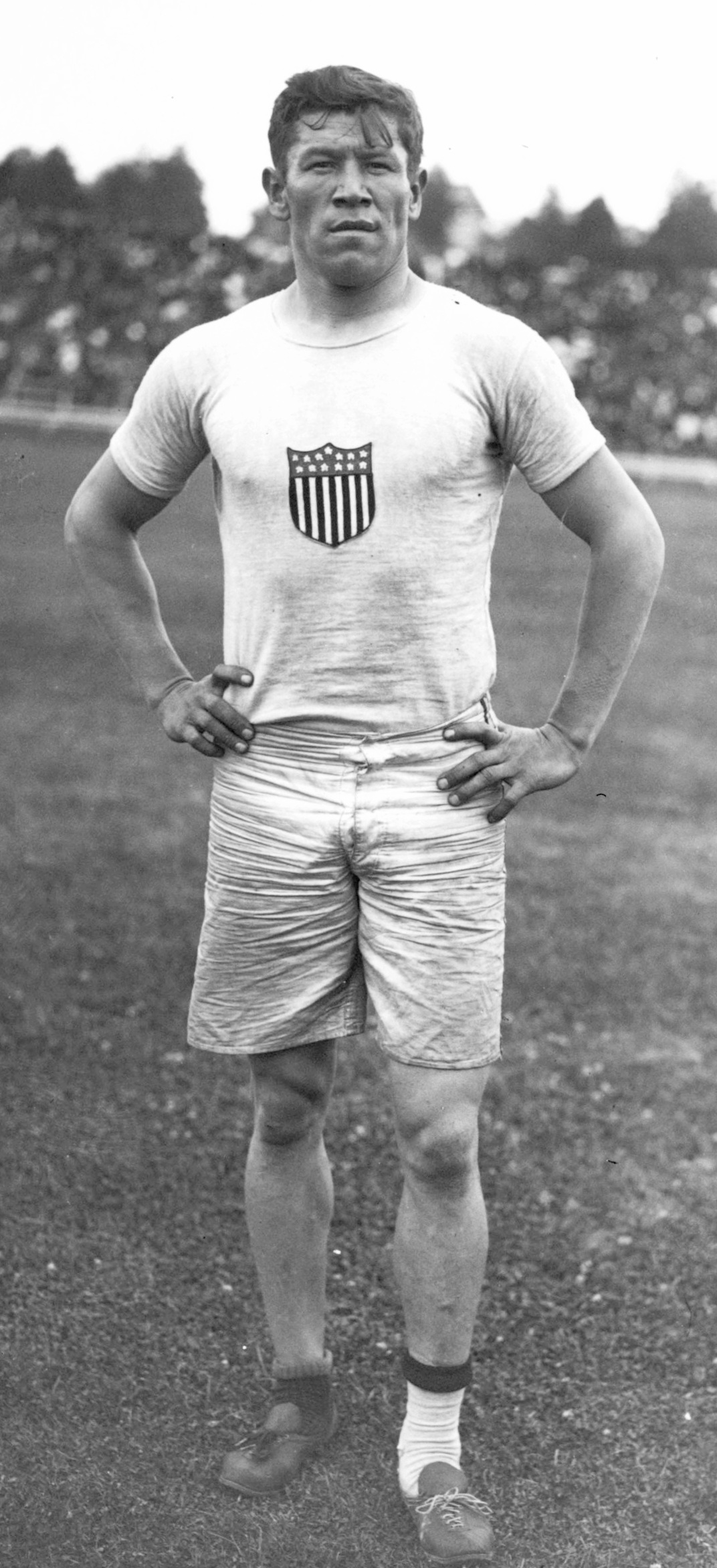
Jim Thorpe at the 1912 Summer Olympics; the same year he had approximately 2,000 yards rushing.

This chart reflects unofficial rushing statistics before the NCAA started keeping official rushing statistics in 1937, compiled by historians largely from contemporary newspaper accounts. No available data for missing seasons.

College football yearly rushing yards leaders
Season	Leader	Yds	Team	Refs
1936	Marshall Goldberg	860	Pittsburgh	
1935	Kayo Lam	1,043 (Note: Non-major Cumberland's Lindsey Donnell rushed for 1,659 yards)	Colorado	
1934	Kayo Lam	906	Colorado	
1933	Beattie Feathers	663	Tennessee	
1931	Shipwreck Kelly	1,074	Kentucky	
1930	Frank Christensen	1,131	Utah	
1929	Lloyd Brazil	1,117	Detroit	
1928	Ken Strong	2,032	NYU	
1927	Glenn Presnell	1,448	Nebraska	
1924	Red Strader	1,421	St. Mary's	
1921	Red Barron	1,459	Georgia Tech	
1920	Jimmy Leech	1,723	VMI	
1917	Everett Strupper	1,150	Georgia Tech	
1912	Jim Thorpe	1,869	Carlisle	
1911	Jim Thorpe	899	Carlisle	
1908	Jim Thorpe	781	Carlisle	
1904	Willie Heston	686	Michigan	
1902	Willie Heston	487	Michigan	
1901	Willie Heston	684	Michigan	

College football yearly rushing touchdowns leaders
Season	Leader	TDs	Team	Refs
1934	Bill Shepherd	18	Western Maryland	
1933	Beattie Feathers	13	Tennessee	
1929	Gene McEver	18	Tennessee	
1928	Ken Strong	22	NYU	
1927	Joel Hunt	19	Texas A&M	
1926	Mayes McLain	38	Haskell	
1925	Peggy Flournoy	19	Tulane	
1925	Mort Kaer	19	USC	
1920	Jimmy Leech	26	VMI	
1919	Ira Rodgers	19	West Virginia	
1917	Albert Hill	23	Georgia Tech	
1915	Neno DaPrato	34	Michigan Agricultural	
1914	Eugene Mayer	21	Virginia	
1912	Jim Thorpe	29	Carlisle	
1904	Willie Heston	21	Michigan	
1902	Al Herrnstein	26	Michigan	
1901	Willie Heston	20	Michigan	
1891	Everett Lake	39	Harvard	
1890	Philip King	29	Princeton	
1887	Knowlton Ames	20	Princeton	
1886	Harry Beecher	33	Yale	

College football yearly rushing average leaders
Season	Leader	YPC	Team	Refs
1931	Shipwreck Kelly	6.3	Kentucky	
1920	Buck Flowers	10.2	Georgia Tech	
1917	Everett Strupper	10.1	Georgia Tech	
1912	Jim Thorpe	9.8	Carlisle	
1911	Jim Thorpe	8.0	Carlisle	
1904	Willie Heston	12.7	Michigan	
1902	Willie Heston	8.7	Michigan	
1901	Willie Heston	10.2	Michigan	

== Leading programs ==
Count	Program	Players
7	Oklahoma	Patrick Collins; Kenny King; Buck McPhail; Greg Pruitt; Buster Rhymes; Billy Sims; Clendon Thomas
7	USC	Marcus Allen; Ricky Bell; Reggie Bush; Mike Garrett; O. J. Simpson; Charles White; LenDale White
6	Alabama	Shaun Alexander; Santonio Beard; Najee Harris; Derrick Henry; Wilbur Jackson; Bobby Marlow
6	Nebraska	Ahman Green; William Greenlaw; Calvin Jones; Lawrence Phillips; Tom Rathman; Mike Rozier
6	Texas	Cedric Benson; Earl Campbell; Jimmy Saxton; Ricky Williams; Gralyn Wyatt; Vince Young
5	Northern Illinois	LeShon Johnson; Mark Kellar; Stacey Robinson; Chad Spann; Garrett Wolfe
5	Ohio State	Keith Byars; Eddie George; Archie Griffin; Champ Henson; Pete Johnson
5	Oklahoma State	Ernest Anderson; Bob Fenimore; Ollie Gordon II; Chuba Hubbard; Barry Sanders
5	San Diego State	Marshall Faulk; Paul Hewitt; George Jones; Rashaad Penny; Donnel Pumphrey
4	Air Force	Brian Bream; Mike Brown; John Lee Eldridge III; Brad Roberts
4	Arizona State	Joe Belland; Leon Burton; Tony Lorick; Wilford White
4	Army	Bob Anderson; Doc Blanchard; Bryson Daily; Glenn Davis
4	New Mexico State	Pervis Atkins; Bob Gaiters; Kenton Keith; Preacher Pilot
4	Wisconsin	Montee Ball; Ron Dayne; Melvin Gordon; Jonathan Taylor

== Notable facts ==
- Since 1937, seven players have led the country in rushing yards twice: Troy Davis in 1995 and 1996 (Iowa State); Art Luppino in 1954 and 1955 (Arizona); Rudy Mobley in 1942 and 1946 (Hardin–Simmons); Preacher Pilot in 1961 and 1962 (New Mexico State); O. J. Simpson in 1967 and 1968 (USC); LaDainian Tomlinson in 1999 and 2000 (TCU); and Ricky Williams in 1997 and 1998 (Texas).
- Three programs have had different players lead the country in rushing in consecutive seasons: Hardin–Simmons (Rudy Mobley in 1946; Wilton Davis in 1947), New Mexico State (Pervis Atkins in 1959; Bob Gaiters in 1960; Preacher Pilot in 1961 and 1962), and San Diego State (Donnel Pumphrey in 2016; Rashaad Penny in 2017).
- The single-season rushing record has been broken eight times: Rudy Mobley (1942 with 1,281 yards), Fred Wendt (1948 with 1,570), O. J. Simpson (1968 with 1,709), Don McCauley (1970 with 1,720), Ed Marinaro (1971 with 1,881), Tony Dorsett (1976 with 1,948), Marcus Allen (1981 with 2,342) and Barry Sanders (1988 with 2,628 rushing yards).
- The highest yards per carry in a season was set in 1939 by Jackie Robinson (UCLA) with 12.2 YPC on 42 attempts.
- The single-season rushing touchdown record is 37, set in 1988 by Barry Sanders of Oklahoma State.
- The 2020 COVID‑19 pandemic season was unusual: Michael Carter (North Carolina) is recognized as the official YPC leader, playing 11 games and leading the group with 156 carries for 1,245 yards. Notable performances in shortened schedules include Bijan Robinson (Texas, 8.2 YPC, 9 games), Rachaad White (Arizona State, 10.0 YPC, 4 games), and Jake Funk (Maryland, 8.6 YPC, 5 games).
