= Fred Wendt =

American football player (1924–2020)

Texas Mines
- Positions: Back, punter

Personal information
- Born: July 15, 1924; Las Cruces, New Mexico, U.S.
- Died: May 18, 2020 (aged 95)
- Listed height: 5 ft 11 in (1.80 m)
- Listed weight: 180 lb (82 kg)

Career information
- College: Texas Mines

Awards and highlights
- Second-team Little All-American (1948); NCAA rushing yards leader (1948)

Fred Edward Wendt (July 15, 1924 – May 18, 2020) was an American football player. He played college football for Texas Mines and set multiple national rushing and scoring records in 1948. His single-season tally of 1,570 rushing yards remained an NCAA record until 1968.

== Early life ==
Wendt was born in 1924 in Las Cruces, New Mexico. In his childhood, he lived in Lubbock, Amarillo, and El Paso, Texas. He graduated in 1942 from Austin High School in El Paso.

== Texas Mines ==
Wendt enrolled at the Texas College of Mines (now known as the University of Texas at El Paso) in 1942. He played college football for Texas Mines in 1942, appearing in one game at the end position. He enlisted in the Army Air Corps in December 1942, spending two years in the Pacific, including stints in Australia, the Philippines, and Okinawa.

After World War II, he returned to Texas Mines, playing in the backfield in 1946, 1947, and 1948. In 1946, he was one of the leading punters in the country, finishing with an average of 42.8 yards per punt -- a tenth of a yard short of the punting championship. Again in 1947, he ranked among the nation's leading punters, ranking 16th nationally with an average of 39.8 yards per punt.

During the 1948 season, Wendt gained fame for his rushing rather than his punting. He set multiple NCAA records including the following:

- Wendt tallied 1,570 rushing yards in 1948 (not including 92 yards gained in the Sun Bowl), breaking the NCAA single-season record of 1,281 yards set by Rudy Mobley in 1942. Wendt's rushing record stood for 20 years until it was broken in 1968 by O. J. Simpson.
- Wendt also broke the NCAA single-season scoring record with 152 points in 10 games, including 32 place-kicking points.
- On Thanksgiving Day in 1948, Wendt set NCAA single-game records with 326 rushing yards and 42 points scored in a 92–7 victory over New Mexico A&M.

For his career at Texas Mines, Wendt tallied 2,166 rushing yards and 23 touchdowns. His career average of 7.65 yards per carry remains a UTEP record. He was inducted into the UTEP Athletics Hall of Fame in 2005. Wendt also completed as a sprinter for the track team, consistently running under 10 seconds in the 100-yard dash.

== Later life ==
Wendt was injured in a chemical explosion when he mixed amomonia with another substance in a campus laboratory in June 1949; his eye was burned but responded to treatment with no sight impairment. Two months later, Wendt injured his knee while practicing for the college football all-star game; he had signed with the Chicago Cardinals, but the injury and surgery on his knee resulted in his missing the 1949 season. He was again signed by the Cardinals in April 1950. He was traded to the Detroit Lions in August 1948. He was released by the Lions several days later.

After his playing career, Wendt was a businessman in Odessa, Texas. He was married in January 1950 to Dorris Bowden in a ceremony in El Paso. They had a daughter, Dorris Jane, in January 1951. Wendt died on May 18, 2020.

== See also ==
- List of NCAA major college football yearly rushing leaders
- List of NCAA major college football yearly scoring leaders
