= Melvin Gordon =

American football player (born 1993)

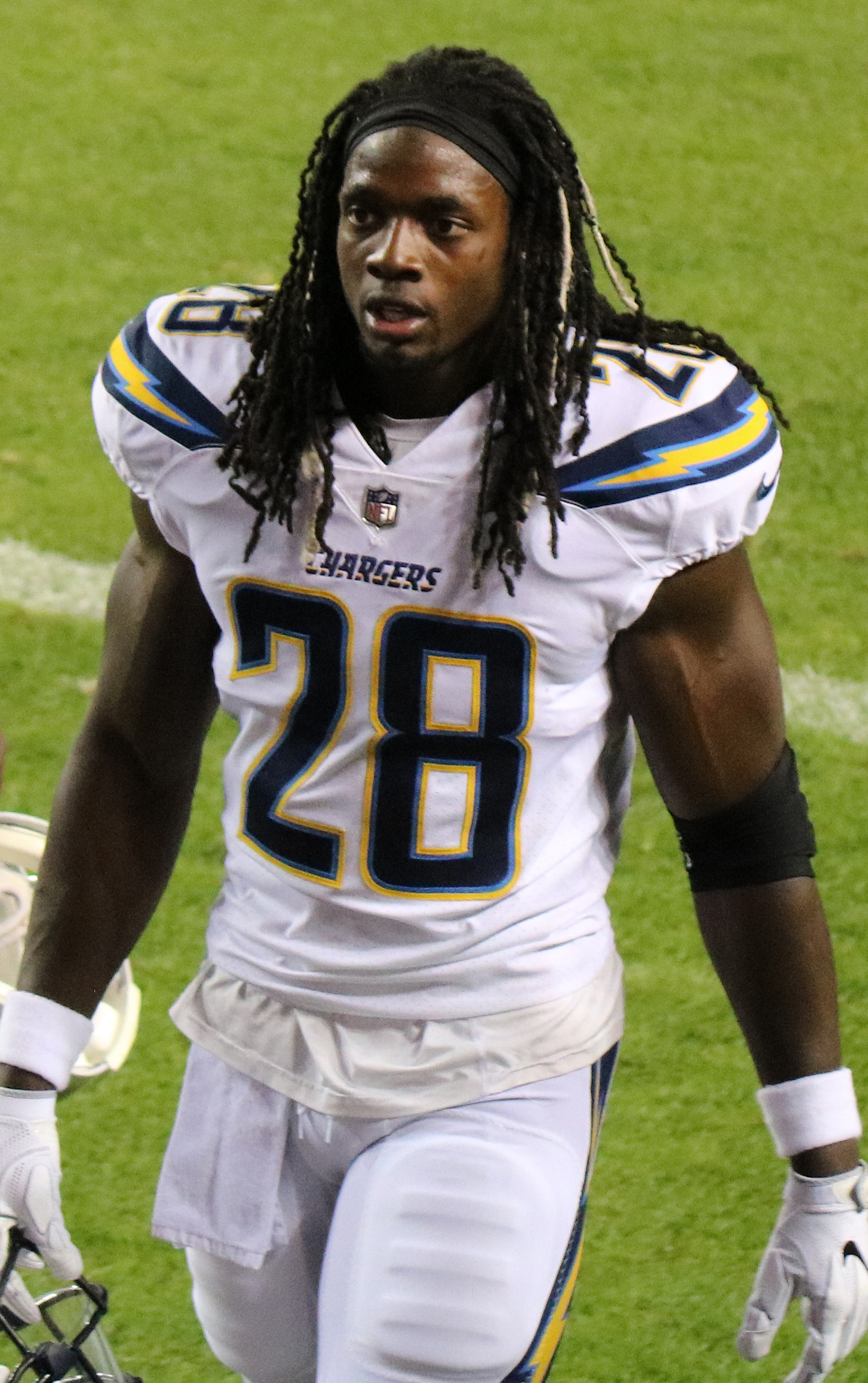
- Gordon with the Los Angeles Chargers in 2017

No. 28, 25, 33
- Position: Running back

Personal information
- Born: April 13, 1993 (age 33); Kenosha, Wisconsin, U.S.
- Listed height: 6 ft 1 in (1.85 m)
- Listed weight: 215 lb (98 kg)

Career information
- High school: Bradford (Kenosha)
- College: Wisconsin (2011–2014)
- NFL draft: 2015: 1st round, 15th overall pick

Career history
- San Diego / Los Angeles Chargers (2015–2019); Denver Broncos (2020–2022); Kansas City Chiefs (2022)*; Baltimore Ravens (2023)
- * Offseason or practice squad member only

Awards and highlights
- Super Bowl champion (LVII); 2× Pro Bowl (2016, 2018); Doak Walker Award (2014); Jim Brown Trophy (2014); Unanimous All-American (2014); NCAA rushing yards leader (2014); NCAA rushing touchdowns leader (2014); NCAA scoring co-leader (2014); Big Ten Most Valuable Player (2014); Big Ten Offensive Player of the Year (2014); Big Ten Running Back of the Year (2014); First-team All-Big Ten (2014); Second-team All-Big Ten (2013)

Career NFL statistics
- Rushing yards: 6,543
- Rushing average: 4.1
- Rushing touchdowns: 56
- Receptions: 312
- Receiving yards: 2,513
- Receiving touchdowns: 14
- Stats at Pro Football Reference

Melvin Gordon III (born April 13, 1993) is an American former professional football player who was a running back in the National Football League (NFL). He played college football for the Wisconsin Badgers, earning unanimous All-American honors and winning the Doak Walker Award as the top college running back in 2014. Gordon was selected by the San Diego Chargers in the first round of the 2015 NFL draft with the 15th overall pick. He was also a member of the Denver Broncos, Kansas City Chiefs, and Baltimore Ravens.

Gordon briefly held the NCAA Division I FBS single-game rushing yards record with 408 yards, set playing in three quarters against Nebraska in November 2014, until it was broken the following week. He became the second-leading all-time single-season rusher in FBS history with 2,587 yards, falling 41 yards shy of Barry Sanders record of 2,628 yards set in 1988.

== Early life ==
Gordon was born and raised in Kenosha, Wisconsin and briefly attended Grayslake Central High School in Illinois before transferring to Mary D. Bradford High School, where he was a two-sport star for the Red Devils in both football and track. In football, Gordon tallied 1,098 yards and 11 touchdowns on 99 carries, and had five receiving touchdowns, and was an honorable mention All-state and All-region by the Wisconsin Football Coaches Association (WFCA) as a junior. He was a first-team All-state selection by the Associated Press and the WFCA as a senior, after rushing for 2,009 yards with 38 touchdowns. Gordon was the Wisconsin Gatorade Football Player of the Year. He played on the same team as cornerback Trae Waynes, who was selected four spots ahead of Gordon in the 2015 NFL draft by the Minnesota Vikings.

As an outstanding track & field athlete, Gordon was one of the state's top performers in the long jump. At the 2011 Racine Invitational event, he ran the 55-meter dash in a PR 6.39 seconds on his way to a first-place finish. Gordon earned a second-place finish in the 100-meter dash at the 2011 SEC Outdoor Conference, recording a career-best time of 10.95 seconds. At the 2011 WIAA Track & Field State Championships, he took silver in the long jump event after posting a career-best leap of 7.20 meters (23 ft 7 in).

Regarded as a four-star recruit by the Rivals.com recruiting service, Gordon was ranked the No. 24 running back in the nation. He was ranked the top player in Wisconsin by ESPN.com. Gordon chose Wisconsin over scholarship offers from Iowa, Louisville, and Michigan. He originally committed to the University of Iowa but decommitted and chose the University of Wisconsin–Madison instead.

College recruiting
Name	Hometown	School	Height	Weight	40^{‡}	Commit date
Melvin Gordon; RB	Kenosha, WI	Bradford	6 ft 1 in (1.85 m)	185 lb (84 kg)	4.5	Dec 5, 2010
Melvin Gordon; RB	Recruit ratings: Scout: Rivals: 247Sports: ESPN:					
Overall recruit ranking: Scout: #38 RB Rivals: #24 RB 247Sports: #6 RB ESPN: #39 ATH
‡ Refers to 40-yard dash; Note: In many cases, Scout, Rivals, 247Sports, On3, and ESPN may conflict in their listings of height, weight and 40 time.; In these cases, the average was taken. ESPN grades are on a 100-point scale.; Sources: "Rivals.com 2011 Wisconsin Football Commitments". Rivals.; "Scout.com 2011 Wisconsin Football Commits". Scout.; "ESPN 2011 Wisconsin Football Commits". ESPN.; "Scout.com Team Recruiting Rankings". Scout.; "2011 Team Ranking". Rivals.com.; "247sports.com 2011 Wisconsin Football Commits". 247Sports.

== College career ==
Gordon attended the University of Wisconsin-Madison, where he played for the Wisconsin Badgers football team from 2011 through 2014 under head coaches Bret Bielema, Barry Alvarez, and Gary Andersen.

=== 2011 season ===
As a freshman in 2011, Gordon played in three games, recording 20 carries for 98 yards and a touchdown. He rushed for his first career collegiate touchdown in the 59–10 victory over South Dakota on September 24. Gordon was given a medical redshirt after suffering a groin injury.

=== 2012 season ===
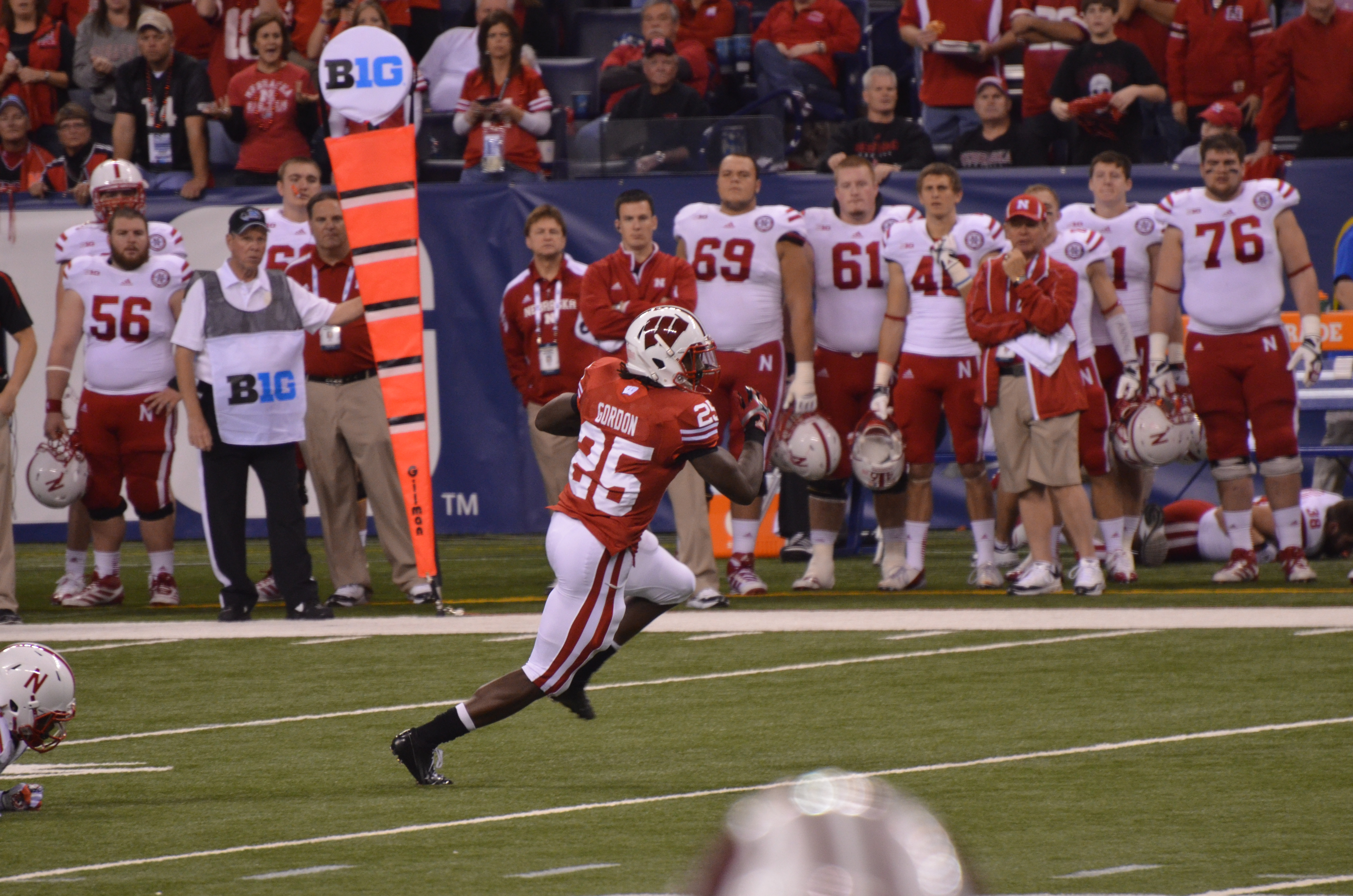
Gordon during a 56-yard touchdown run in the 2012 Big Ten Football Championship Game

In 2012, Gordon was the third string running back behind Montee Ball and James White. In the Badgers' third game against UTEP, he had eight carries for 112 rushing yards and a touchdown for his first collegiate game going over the century mark. Gordon set a career-high record of 216 yards on nine carries averaging 24 yards per carry in the 2012 Big Ten Football Championship Game against the Nebraska Cornhuskers where the unranked Badgers defeated the #12 Cornhuskers by a score of 70–31. During the 2013 Rose Bowl, he had nine carries for 51 yards against #6 Stanford but ultimately the unranked Badgers lost by a score of 20–14.

Over the course of the 2012 season, Gordon had 62 carries for 621 yards and three touchdowns.

=== 2013 season ===
James White and Gordon received a majority of the carries and the backfield and both were productive. To start the season, Gordon had 13 carries for 144 yards and a touchdown against Massachusetts. In the next game against Tennessee Tech, he recorded nine carries for 140 yards and a touchdown for a 15.6 yards per carry average. The following week, the Badgers had their first setback of the season on the road against Arizona State. Gordon had a season high in yardage with 193 yards on 15 carries for two rushing touchdowns. Gordon found the endzone thrice to go along with 147 yards on 16 carries in the following game against Purdue. After a setback to Ohio State in the following game, Gordon and Badgers reeled off a six-game winning streak. To start the winning streak, Gordon had 22 carries for 172 rushing yards and one rushing touchdown against Northwestern. A week later against Illinois, he found the endzone three times for the second time in the 2013 season. In the victory, Gordon tallied 142 rushing yards on 17 carries to go along with the touchdowns. On November 14, Gordon was named one of the 10 semifinalists for the 2013 Doak Walker Award. Two days later, against Indiana, he had 13 carries for 146 yards and a touchdown.

In December 2013, Gordon announced after much speculation that he would be returning to Wisconsin for his junior season. In explaining his decision, Gordon stated that,"I love the University of Wisconsin and feel that there is still a lot of room for growth...academically, another year in school will help me get closer to completing my degree, and on the field I hope to help my team get back the Big Ten championship." With their 9–3 record, the Badgers earned a spot in the Capital One Bowl against South Carolina. In the 34–24 loss, Gordon had 25 carries for 143 yards. In the 2013 season, Gordon recorded 206 carries for 1,609 yards and 12 touchdowns.

=== 2014 season ===
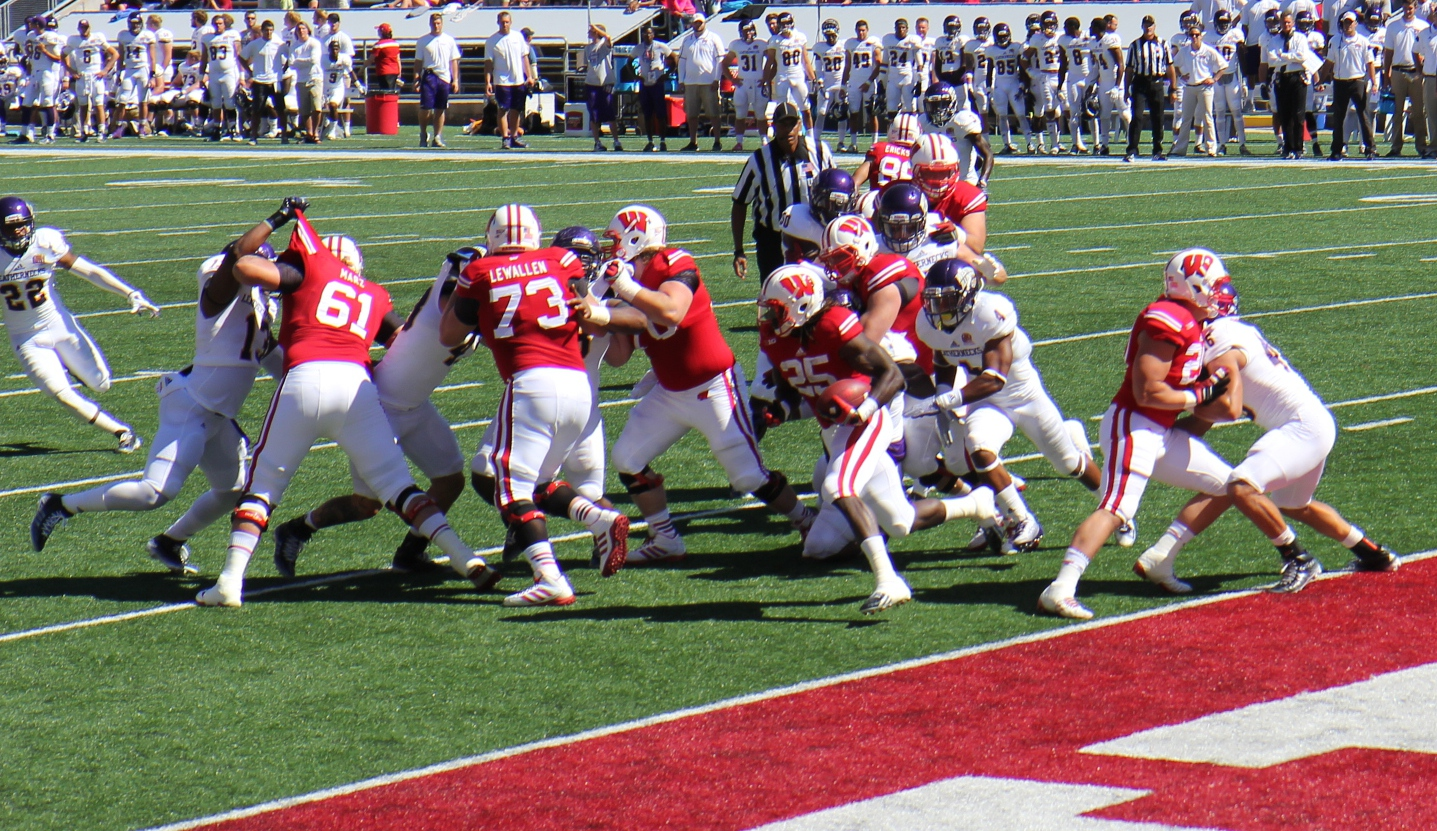
Rushing against Western Illinois

Prior to the season, Gordon was widely viewed as a Heisman Trophy contender. He was also on preseason watchlists for the Maxwell Award, Doak Walker Award, and Walter Camp Award. 2014 was the first year where Gordon was Wisconsin's featured running back; in 2012, he was behind both Montee Ball and James White, and in 2013, Gordon was behind James White with Corey Clement as the third string running back after Gordon.

Gordon began the season with 16 carries for 140 yards against #13 LSU on August 30 at NRG Stadium in Houston, Texas. LSU came back from a 24–7 deficit to win the game by a score of 28–24. Wisconsin's head coach, Gary Andersen, was criticized for him only having three carries in the second half and when questioned Anderson stated he "didn't know why Gordon had limited carries". Gordon stated to the media after the game that he wasn't injured. However, two days later Andersen stated that Gordon strained his hip-flexor on the last play in the second quarter of the game against LSU and "we were trying to be smart with him as the rest of the game went on". In the second game of the season against the Western Illinois Leathernecks (FCS), Gordon was held to a season-low 38 rushing yards on 17 carries.

On September 20 against Bowling Green, Gordon rushed for 253 yards and a career-high five touchdowns. Two weeks later, Gordon surpassed his 253-yard game rushing against Bowling Green when he reached 259 yards rushing against Northwestern at Ryan Field in a losing effort. Gordon was named to the CBSSports.com Midseason College Football All-America Team. He was also one of 20 semifinalists for the Maxwell Award.

On November 15, Gordon broke LaDainian Tomlinson's 15-year-old FBS single-game rushing record by two yards, totaling 408 yards against the #16 Nebraska Cornhuskers. He scored four rushing touchdowns on only 25 carries in three quarters of play. The record stood for only a week before Samaje Perine of Oklahoma rushed for 427 yards against Kansas. Reflecting on the short-lived record, Gordon said: "That's disappointing, to have that. But congrats to that guy; that's really not easy to do." In addition, he broke the 339-yard school record, held by Ron Dayne since 1996, and the 377-yard Big Ten Conference record, held by Indiana running back Anthony Thompson since 1989. Gordon garnered multiple Player of the Week awards for his performance against Nebraska. The Walter Camp Football Foundation, Athlon Sports, and CBSSports.com named him National Offensive Player of the Week, and the Big Ten named him the conference Offensive Player of the Week.

On November 19, Gordon was named one of 10 semifinalists for the Doak Walker Award and listed as one of the fifteen "Players to Watch" for the Walter Camp Award. The Doak Walker Award National Selection Committee released the three finalists on November 25, and the Walter Camp Foundation released the five finalists on December 3.

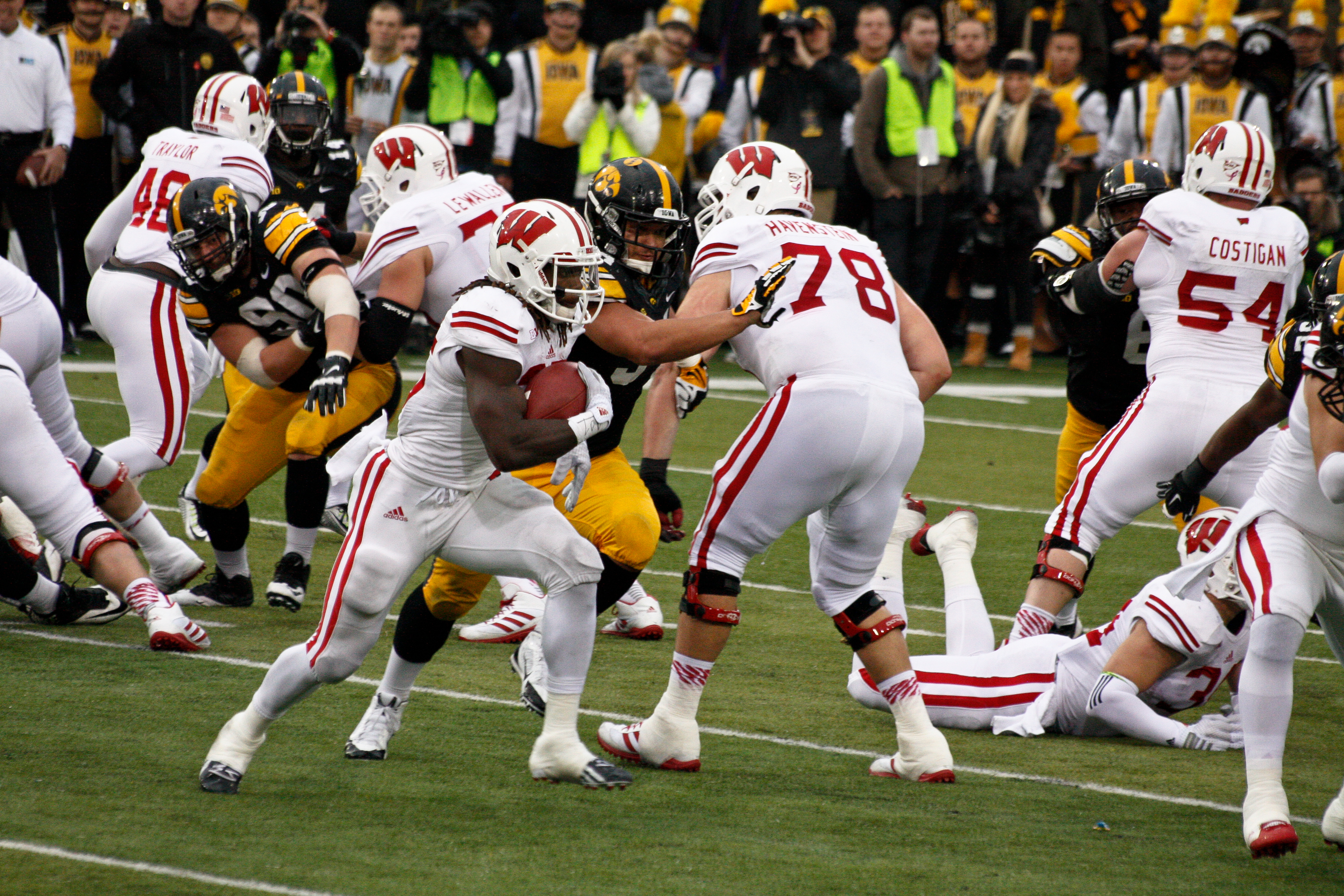
Gordon running against the Iowa Hawkeyes defense in 2014 at Kinnick Stadium

On November 22, against Iowa at Kinnick Stadium, Gordon rushed for 200 yards and had four receptions for 64 yards, leading the team in both categories. He went over 2,000 yards rushing for the season, only the 17th player in FBS history to do so. Gordon reached the 2,000-yard mark faster than any of his predecessors, on just 241 carries. The previous holder for fastest 2,000 yards was Penn State running back Larry Johnson who accomplished the feat on 251 carries in 2002. Gordon was named Big Ten Offensive Player of the Week for the third time that season as a result of his performance at Kinnick Stadium.

On November 25, Gordon was named as a finalist for the Maxwell Award with quarterbacks Marcus Mariota (Oregon) and Dak Prescott (Mississippi State). Gordon and fellow Big Ten running backs Ameer Abdullah (Nebraska) and Tevin Coleman (Indiana) were named the three finalists for the Doak Walker Award. Gordon would later win the award. On December 1, Gordon was named the Big Ten's Ameche–Dayne Running Back of the Year as well as being a consensus 1st Team All-Big Ten Running Back. The following day, Gordon was named the Big Ten's Graham–George Offensive Player of the Year.

Gordon was one of three Heisman Trophy finalists joining Oregon quarterback Marcus Mariota and Alabama wide receiver Amari Cooper. Gordon became Wisconsin's fourth finalist for the Heisman Trophy, all of whom played running back for the Badgers. Alan Ameche (1954) and Ron Dayne (1999) won the award, while Montee Ball (2011) finished fourth in the final balloting. Gordon finished second in the Heisman Trophy voting behind Mariota.

Gordon waived his final year of college eligibility and entered the 2015 NFL Draft.

In Gordon's final college game, the 2015 Outback Bowl, he rushed for 251 yards against the #19 Auburn Tigers in a 34–31 overtime victory. Gordon set the Outback Bowl rushing record with his performance and was named the game MVP. For the season, he gained 2,587 yards. That total ranks third in FBS history behind Ashton Jeanty, who rushed for 2,601 yards in 2024, and the 2,628-yard record held by Barry Sanders since 1988. Gordon's 29 rushing touchdowns led the NCAA In 2015.

== Professional career ==
=== Pre-draft ===
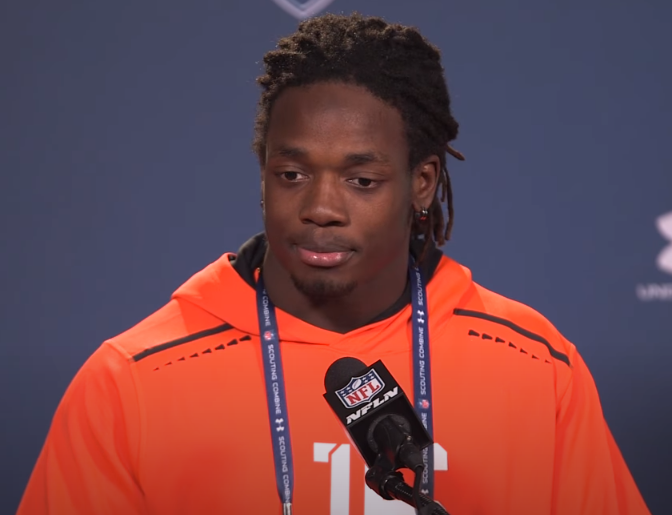
Gordon at the NFL Scouting Combine in 2015

After the end of the 2014 college football season, Gordon prepared for the NFL Combine at EXOS San Diego in Carlsbad based on his former Wisconsin teammate Jared Abbrederis's recommendation.

At the 2015 NFL Combine, Gordon set a new record for the 60-yard shuttle with 11.0 seconds. However, the record was then broken by Byron Jones who had a time of 10.98 seconds.

The San Diego Chargers selected Gordon in the first round with the 15th overall pick. In addition, he was one of two Wisconsin Badgers to be selected that year.

Pre-draft measurables
Height	Weight	Arm length	Hand span	Wingspan	40-yard dash	10-yard split	20-yard split	20-yard shuttle	Three-cone drill	Vertical jump	Broad jump	Bench press	Wonderlic
6 ft 0 5/8 in (1.84 m)	215 lb (98 kg)	32 3/8 in (0.82 m)	9 3/4 in (0.25 m)	6 ft 4 3/8 in (1.94 m)	4.52 s	1.62 s	2.66 s	4.07 s	7.04 s	35 in (0.89 m)	10 ft 6 in (3.20 m)	19 reps	20
All values from NFL Combine

=== San Diego / Los Angeles Chargers ===
==== 2015 season ====
On May 15, 2015, the Chargers signed Gordon to a four-year, fully guaranteed contract for $10.66 million, with a $6 million signing bonus. The contract included a fifth-year option.

Gordon began his professional career being named the starting running back for the Chargers' season opener, ahead of veterans Danny Woodhead and Branden Oliver. On September 13, 2015, he received his first career start against the Detroit Lions and finished the 33–28 victory with 14 carries for 51 yards and three receptions for 16 yards. The next week, he carried the ball 16 times for a season-high 88 yards and made a 10-yard reception in a 24–19 loss at the Cincinnati Bengals. On October 12, 2015, Gordon had seven catches for a season-high 52 yards and also accounted for 42 yards on 15 carries in a 20–24 loss to the Pittsburgh Steelers in Week 5. During a Week 6 matchup at the Green Bay Packers, he had seven attempts for 29 yards and lost two fumbles in a 20–27 loss. After six consecutive starts to begin his career, Gordon was benched for the beginning of a Week 7 contest against the Oakland Raiders. He finished the game with seven carries for 29 yards. Gordon returned to his starting role the next game at the Baltimore Ravens and carried the ball a season-high 18 times for 54 yards in a 26–29 loss. In his last game of the season, he had 15 rushing attempts and 41 yards in a 30–14 victory over the Miami Dolphins.

On December 21, 2015, the Chargers placed Gordon on season-ending injured reserve after sustaining a knee injury the previous day against the Dolphins. He finished his rookie year with 184 carries for 641 yards and 33 receptions for 192 yards in 14 games and 12 starts as the Chargers finished with a 4–12 record.

==== 2016 season ====
On May 10, 2016, it was revealed that Gordon had undergone microfracture surgery in January, but would still be ready for training camp and other activities starting in 2016.

On September 11, 2016, Gordon scored his first two career rushing touchdowns in the season opener against the Kansas City Chiefs. He finished the 33–27 overtime loss with 14 carries for 57 yards. After Danny Woodhead tore his ACL in Week 2 and was out for the season, Gordon became the Chargers' main running back option for the 2016 season. In Week 2, against the Jacksonville Jaguars, he finished with 24 carries for 102 yards and a rushing touchdown in the 38–14 victory. In the next game against the Indianapolis Colts, he was limited to only 35 rushing yards, but he also recorded his fourth rushing touchdown of the season in the 26–22 loss. In the next game, against the New Orleans Saints, he finished with only 36 rushing yards but had two more rushing touchdowns in the 35–34 loss After the next two games without a rushing touchdown, he recorded 68 rushing yards and two rushing touchdowns against the Atlanta Falcons in the 33–30 victory. In the next game, in a matchup against the Denver Broncos, he finished with 23 carries for 111 yards in the 27–19 loss. During Week 9 against the Tennessee Titans, he had his most productive game of the season with 32 carries for 196 yards and a touchdown while adding 65 receiving yards in the 43–35 victory. He totaled 229 rushing yards and a rushing touchdown from Weeks 10–14 before injuring his hip against the Panthers in Week 14 and missing the rest of the season.

Gordon finished his second professional season with 254 carries for 997 yards and 10 touchdowns to go along with 41 receptions for 419 yards and two touchdowns as the Chargers finished with a 5–11 record. Gordon missed the final three games of the season after suffering hip and knee injuries, finishing just three yards shy of 1,000 yards rushing. Gordon was named to his first Pro Bowl as a replacement for injured Steelers running back Le'Veon Bell.

==== 2017 season ====
On September 11, 2017, in the season opener against the Broncos on Monday Night Football, Gordon returned from his injury and had a receiving touchdown in the 24–21 loss. In Weeks 2 and 3, he recorded a rushing touchdown in both games. In Week 5, Gordon ran for 105 yards on 20 carries and had six catches for 58 yards and two touchdowns in a 27–22 win over the New York Giants, earning him AFC Offensive Player of the Week. In the next game, against the Raiders, he recorded 150 scrimmage yards, one rushing touchdown and one receiving touchdown. On October 29, against the New England Patriots, he had an 87-yard rushing touchdown in the first quarter. The rushing play tied for the longest run in franchise history. He finished with 132 rushing yards and a touchdown in the 21–13 loss in Week 8. From Weeks 14–16, he had a rushing touchdown in three straight games. In Week 15 against the Chiefs, he had 169 total scrimmage yards.

Gordon finished the 2017 season with 284 carries for 1,105 yards and eight touchdowns to go along with 58 receptions for 476 yards and four touchdowns in the Chargers' 9–7 season.

==== 2018 season ====
On May 2, 2018, the Chargers picked up the fifth-year option on Gordon's contract. In the 2018 season opener against the Chiefs, Gordon recorded 64 rushing yards to go along with nine receptions for 102 receiving yards in the 38–28 loss. In Week 2, against the Buffalo Bills, he had three total touchdowns (one rushing and two receiving) in the 31–20 victory. In Week 4, against the San Francisco 49ers, he had 104 rushing yards, 55 receiving yards, and one receiving touchdown in the victory. In Week 6, against the Cleveland Browns, he had 132 rushing yards and three rushing touchdowns in the victory. In Week 9, against the Seattle Seahawks, he had 113 rushing yards and a rushing touchdown in the 25–17 victory. In Week 10 against the Raiders, Gordon rushed for 93 yards and had five catches for 72 yards and a touchdown in the 20–6 victory. In the following game against the Broncos, he totaled 156 scrimmage yards in the 23–22 loss. In Week 12, against the Arizona Cardinals, he suffered an MCL injury and was sidelined for the next game against the Steelers. He returned to playing in Week 16 against the Ravens.

Gordon finished the regular season with 175 carries for 885 yards and 10 touchdowns to go along with 50 receptions for 590 yards and four touchdowns. The Chargers made the playoffs as the #5-seed in the AFC with a 12–4 record. He earned his second Pro Bowl nomination for his accomplishments in the 2018 season. During the Wild Card Round against the Ravens, Gordon rushed for 40 yards and a touchdown in his playoff debut, a 23–17 road victory. In the Divisional Round against the Patriots, Gordon was limited to 15 rushing yards and a touchdown on nine carries during the 41–28 road loss. He was ranked 34th by his fellow players on the NFL Top 100 Players of 2019.

==== 2019 season ====
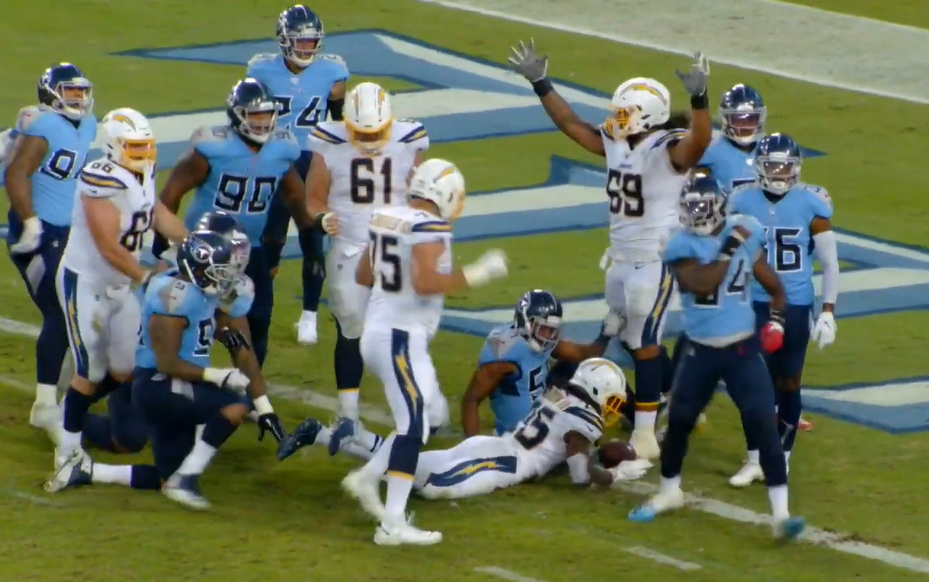
Gordon stopped just short of the endzone in a game against the Tennessee Titans

In February 2019, Gordon changed his jersey number from 28 to 25. He wore 25 throughout his collegiate career with the Wisconsin Badgers.

On July 13, 2019, Gordon told the Chargers that if he did not receive a new contract, he would demand to be traded and skip training camp. His goal in staging a holdout was to make as much money as fellow running backs Todd Gurley, David Johnson, and Le'Veon Bell. Gordon stated that "I know my value. I know what I bring to this team, and I'm sticking with that." Through four seasons, he had 3,628 rushing yards and 1,577 receiving yards along with 38 total touchdowns. On July 16, 2019, Gordon stated that "I want to end up with the Chargers, I mean, that's my home. I'm not going to sit here and be like, I don't want to go back to the Chargers. That's the team who blessed me with an opportunity. They changed my life. Out of all 32 teams, that was the team that called. I can't forget them for that." Gordon continued his holdout into the regular season after the Chargers did not trade him and Ezekiel Elliott was made the NFL's highest-paid running back. He reported to the team on September 26, 2019, and the Chargers received a roster exemption for him.

Gordon made his 2019 regular season debut in a 20–13 loss to the Broncos in Week 5. On October 20, in Week 7 against the Titans, the Chargers had driven down the field to Tennessee's one-yard line and had a chance to score late in the fourth quarter. The Chargers had run with Gordon on first down for no gain as his knee was down before he lost and regained control of the ball on the goal-line. On 2nd down, the Chargers again ran the ball with Gordon where Titans' linebacker Wesley Woodyard forced him to fumble the ball into the endzone which was recovered by defensive end Jurrell Casey leading to a Titans' recovery and touchback. If Gordon had scored the Chargers would have taken the lead with only seven seconds remaining, effectively ensuring a Charger victory. The fumble was the second of the day for Gordon as the Chargers lost 23–20 to fall to a 2–5 record on the season. In Week 8 against the Chicago Bears, Gordon rushed eight times for 31 yards and his first rushing touchdown of the season in the 17–16 win. In Week 9 against the Packers, Gordon rushed 20 times for 80 yards and two touchdowns in the 26–11 win. In Week 10 against the Raiders, Gordon rushed 22 times for 108 yards and a touchdown and caught one pass for 25 yards in the 26–24 loss. This was Gordon's first game with at least 100 rushing yards of the season. In Week 16, against the Raiders, he was limited to 15 rushing yards, but scored on the ground twice in the 24–17 loss.

Gordon finished the 2019 season with 162 carries for 612 yards and eight touchdowns to go along with 42 receptions for 296 yards and a touchdown as the Chargers finished with a 5–11 record. Gordon became a free agent after the season ended.

=== Denver Broncos ===
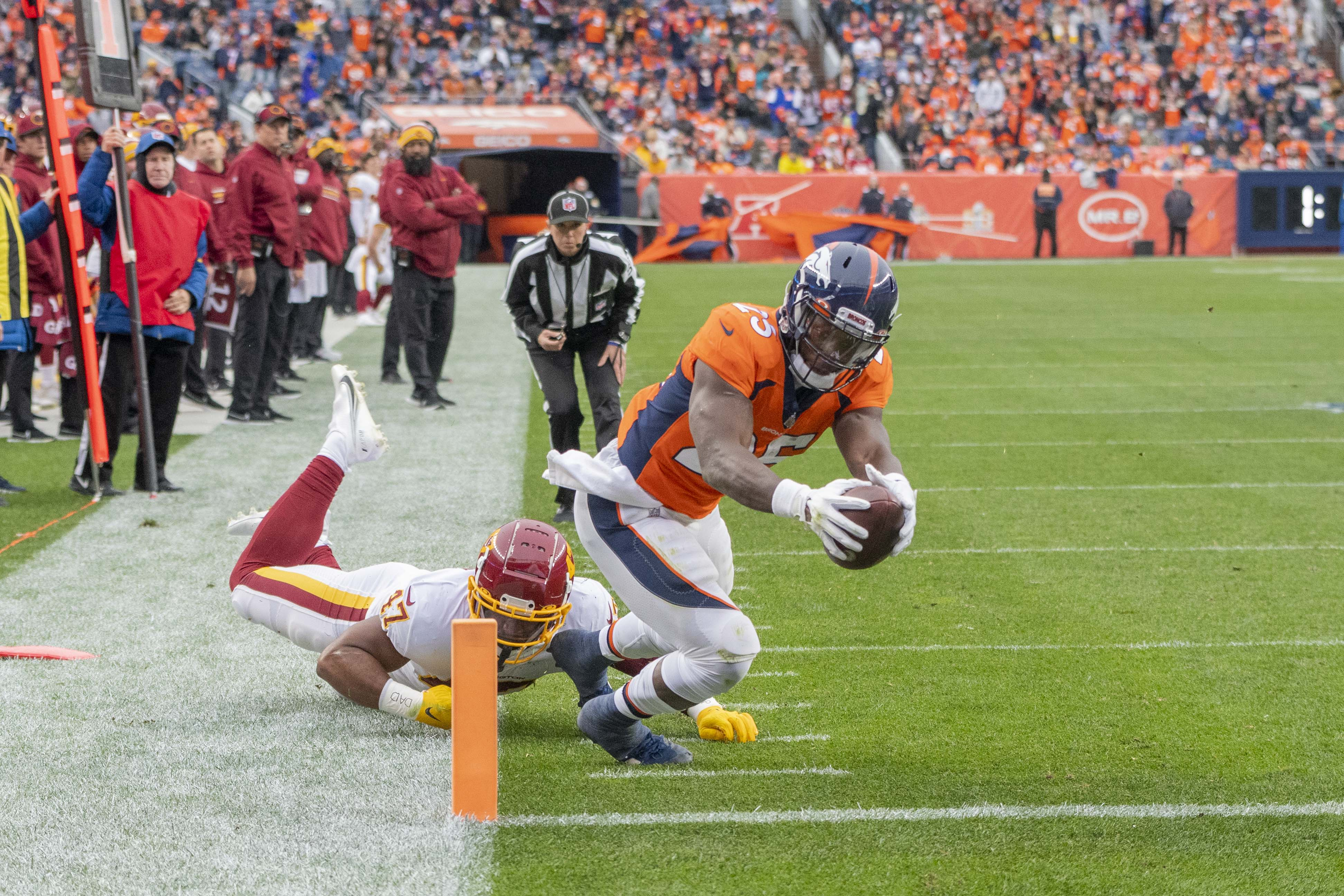
Gordon playing against the Washington Football Team in 2021

On March 26, 2020, Gordon signed a two-year, $16 million contract with the Broncos. The signing became official on April 27.

==== 2020 season ====
Gordon made his debut with the Broncos in Week 1 against the Titans on Monday Night Football. During the game, Gordon rushed 15 times for 78 yards and a rushing touchdown in the 16–14 loss. In Week 4 against the New York Jets on Thursday Night Football, he had 23 carries for 107 rushing yards and two rushing touchdowns, including a game-sealing 43-yard touchdown, in the 37–28 victory. In Week 11 against the Dolphins, Gordon rushed 15 times for 84 yards and two rushing touchdowns during the 20–13 win. During the game, Gordon lost another fumble at the goal line. In Week 13 against the Chiefs on Sunday Night Football, Gordon recorded 15 carries for 131 rushing yards during the 22–16 loss.

Overall, Gordon finished the 2020 season with 215 carries for 986 yards and nine touchdowns to go along with 32 receptions for 158 yards and a touchdown as the Broncos finished with a 5–11 record. While sharing with backfield with Phillip Lindsay and Royce Freeman, Gordon led the team in all major rushing categories.

==== 2021 season ====
Gordon shared the backfield with rookie Javonte Williams in the 2021 season. In Week 1, against the Giants, he had 101 rushing yards, including a 70-yard rushing touchdown, in the 27–13 victory. In Week 14, he had 24 carries for 111 rushing yards and two rushing touchdowns in the 38–10 victory over the Lions. Gordon finished the 2021 season with 203 carries for 918 yards and eight touchdowns to go along with 28 receptions for 213 yards and two touchdowns as the Broncos finished with a 7–10 record. Gordon and Williams proved to be one of the most productive backfield duos in the NFL for the 2021 season.

==== 2022 season ====
On April 27, 2022, Gordon re-signed with the Broncos on a one-year deal. On November 21, the Broncos waived him after a costly fumble against the Las Vegas Raiders, which was his fifth fumble of the season. Gordon played in 10 games during the 2022 season for the Broncos, finishing with 90 carries for 318 yards and two touchdowns to go along with 25 receptions for 223 yards.

=== Kansas City Chiefs ===
Gordon was signed to the Chiefs' practice squad on November 29, 2022. He won his first Super Bowl ring when the Chiefs defeated the Philadelphia Eagles in Super Bowl LVII, despite not having played for Kansas City in the regular season, postseason, or Super Bowl. His practice squad contract with the team expired after the season on February 12, 2023.

=== Baltimore Ravens ===
On July 21, 2023, Gordon signed a one-year contract with the Ravens. He was released on August 29, and re-signed to the practice squad. On September 30, Gordon was elevated to the active roster. He was signed to the active roster on December 19. In Week 17, Gordon scored his first rushing touchdown with the Ravens in a 56–19 blowout victory over the Miami Dolphins. He appeared in four total games for the Ravens in the regular season. Gordon was waived on January 17, 2024, and re-signed to the practice squad two days later.

=== Retirement ===
On October 18, 2025, Gordon signed a one-day contract to retire as a member of the Los Angeles Chargers.

== Career statistics ==
=== NFL ===
==== Regular season ====
Year	Team	Games		Rushing					Receiving					Fumbles	
Year	Team	GP	GS	Att	Yds	Avg	Lng	TD	Rec	Yds	Avg	Lng	TD	Fum	Lost
2015	SD	14	12	182	641	3.5	27	0	33	192	5.8	18	0	**6**	**4**
2016	SD	13	11	254	997	3.9	48	**10**	41	419	10.2	35	2	2	2
2017	LAC	**16**	**16**	**284**	**1,105**	3.9	**87T**	8	**58**	476	8.2	49	**4**	1	0
2018	LAC	12	12	175	885	**5.1**	34T	**10**	50	**490**	9.8	**66T**	**4**	1	0
2019	LAC	12	11	162	612	3.8	24	8	42	296	7.0	25	1	4	3
2020	DEN	15	10	215	986	4.6	65	9	32	158	4.9	20	1	4	**4**
2021	DEN	16	16	203	918	4.5	70T	8	28	213	7.6	30	2	3	3
2022	DEN	10	6	90	318	3.5	17	2	25	223	8.9	24	0	5	2
2023	BAL	4	0	26	81	3.1	22	1	3	46	**15.3**	23	0	1	1
Career		112	94	1,593	6,543	4.1	87T	56	312	2,513	8.1	66T	14	27	19

==== Postseason ====
Year	Team	Games		Rushing					Receiving					Fumbles	
Year	Team	GP	GS	Att	Yds	Avg	Lng	TD	Rec	Yds	Avg	Lng	TD	Fum	Lost
2018	LAC	2	2	26	55	2.1	14	2	2	14	7.0	11	0	0	0
Career		2	2	26	55	2.1	14	2	2	14	7.0	11	0	0	0

=== College ===
Legend
	Led the NCAA
**Bold**	Career high

Season	Team	Games		Rushing				Receiving			
Season	Team	GP	GS	Att	Yds	Avg	TD	Rec	Yds	Avg	TD
2011	Wisconsin	3	0	20	98	4.9	1	0	0	0.0	0
2012	Wisconsin	14	4	62	621	**10.0**	3	2	65	**32.5**	1
2013	Wisconsin	13	4	206	1,609	7.8	12	1	10	10.0	0
2014	Wisconsin	14	14	**343**	**2,587**	7.5	**29**	**19**	**153**	8.1	**3**
Career		44	22	631	4,915	7.8	45	22	228	10.4	4

== Career highlights ==
=== Awards and honors ===
NFL

- Super Bowl champion (LVII)
- 2× Pro Bowl (2016, 2018)
- Ranked No. 34 in the Top 100 Players of 2019

College

- Doak Walker Award (2014)
- Jim Brown Trophy (2014)
- Chicago Tribune Silver Football Award (2014)
- Unanimous All-American (2014)
- NCAA rushing yards leader (2014)
- NCAA rushing touchdowns leader (2014)
- NCAA scoring co-leader (2014)
- Unanimous 1st Team All-Big Ten (2014)
- Second-team All-Big Ten consensus (2013)
- Graham–George Offensive Player of the Year (2014)
- Ameche–Dayne Running Back of the Year (2014)
- 4× Big Ten Offensive Player of the Week (Week 4 – 2013; Weeks 4, 12, 13 – 2014)
- Outback Bowl MVP (2015)
- 2× Academic All-Big Ten (2012, 2013)

=== Records ===
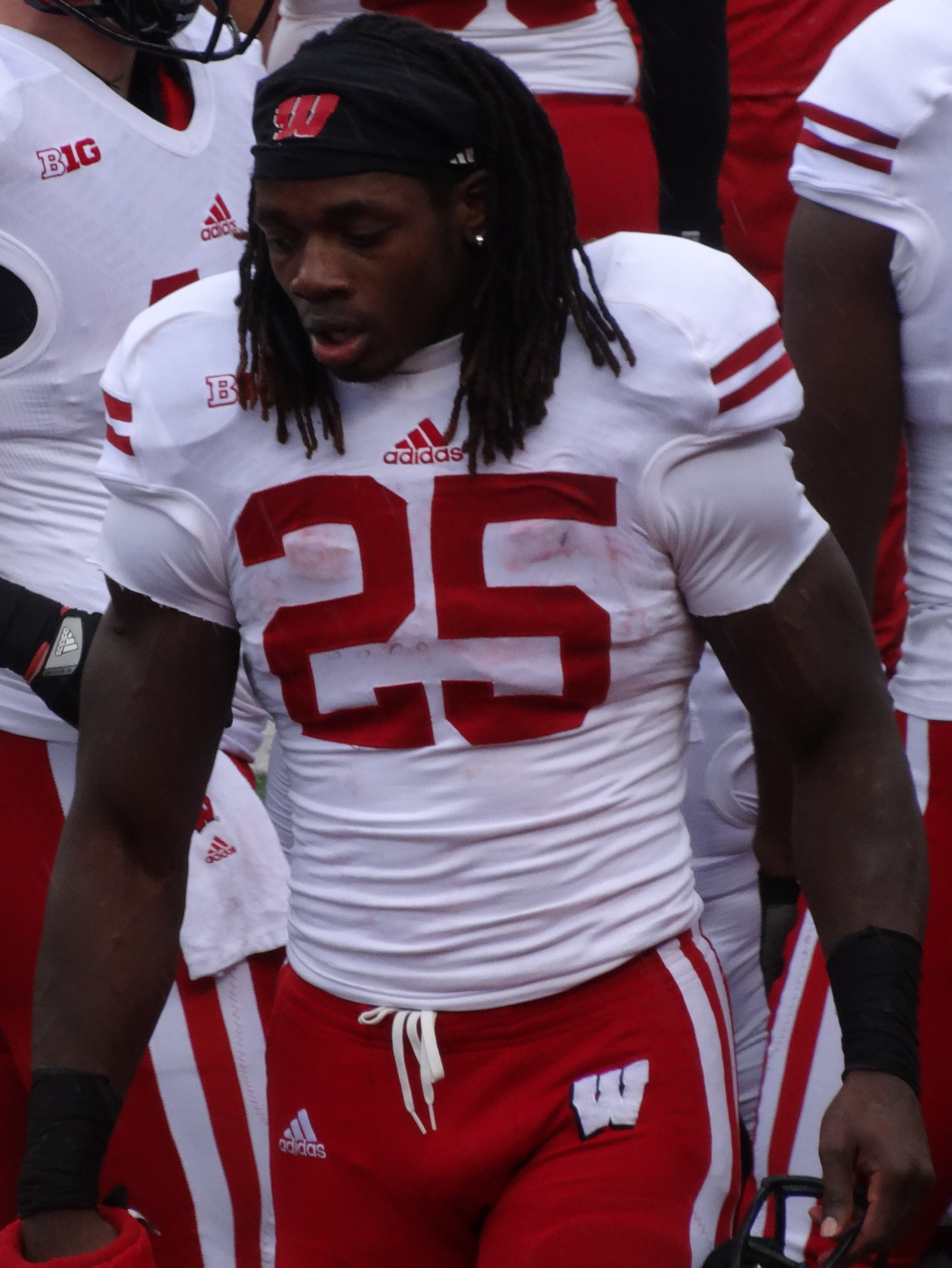
Gordon in 2014

NCAA Division I FBS records

- Fastest player to reach 2,000 yards rushing, season: 241 carries (2014)
- Most rushing yards by teammates, season: 3,536 (2014, Melvin Gordon and Corey Clement)
- Highest average rushing yards per carry, career: 7.79

Big Ten Conference records

- Most rushing yards, season: 2,587 (2014)
- Most rushing yards, conference season: 1,648 (2014)
- Highest average yard per game, conference season: 206.0 (2014)
- Most rushing yards, game: 408 (November 15, 2014, vs. Nebraska)
- Most rushing yards by teammates, season: 3,536 (2014, Melvin Gordon and Corey Clement)

Wisconsin Badgers records

- Most rushing yards, season: 2,587 (2014)
- Most rushing yards, game: 408 (November 15, 2014, vs. Nebraska)
- Most rushing yards, post season game: 251 (2015 Outback Bowl)
- Most rushing yards, single quarter: 189 (November 15, 2014, vs. Nebraska)
- Most rushing yards by teammates, season: 3,536 (2014, Melvin Gordon and Corey Clement)
- Highest average yard per carry, career (min 300 att.): 7.79 (2011–14)
- Highest average yard per carry, season (min 100 att.): 7.81 (2013)
- Highest average yard per carry, game (min 10 att.): 19.5 (September 20, 2014, vs. Bowling Green)
- Most rushing touchdowns, game: 5 (tied) (September 20, 2014, vs. Bowling Green)
- Most games with at least 100 rushing yards, season: 12 (2014)
- Most games with at least 200 rushing yards, season: 6 (2014)

== Personal life ==
In 2018, Gordon founded the Beyond the Flash Foundation, which is designed to help fight hunger and provide needy families with support. The foundation supports mission-aligned organizations in California, Colorado, and Wisconsin.

Gordon was arrested in Denver for speeding and DUI on October 14, 2020. He posted a $55,000 cash bond. Gordon pleaded not guilty to the charges on January 14, 2021. The DUI charge was dismissed on March 10, 2021, and he instead pleaded guilty to speeding and reckless driving.

== See also ==
- List of Los Angeles Chargers first-round draft picks
- List of NCAA major college football yearly rushing leaders
