= DeAndra' Cobb =

American gridiron football player (born 1981)

No. 34
- Position: Running back

Personal information
- Born: May 18, 1981 (age 45); Las Vegas, Nevada, U.S.
- Listed height: 5 ft 10 in (1.78 m)
- Listed weight: 196 lb (89 kg)

Career information
- High school: Ed W. Clark (Las Vegas)
- College: Michigan State
- NFL draft: 2005: 6th round, 201st overall pick

Career history
- Atlanta Falcons (2005); Jacksonville Jaguars (2006)*; Hamilton Tiger-Cats (2009–2010); Montreal Alouettes (2011)*
- * Offseason or practice squad member only
- Stats at Pro Football Reference
- Stats at CFL.ca (archive)

DeAndra' Cobb (born May 18, 1981) is an American former professional football running back. He was selected by the Atlanta Falcons in the sixth round of the 2005 NFL draft. He played college football for the Michigan State Spartans.

Cobb was also a member of the Jacksonville Jaguars, Hamilton Tiger-Cats, and Montreal Alouettes.

== Early life ==
Cobb attended Clark High School in Las Vegas, Nevada and was a letterman in football and track. In track, he finished second in the 100 meters at the 1999 Nevada Class 4A Championships, and ran a personal best of 10.4 seconds in the 100 meters. He graduated from Clark High School in 1999.

== College career ==
He was regarded as one of the premier kickoff returners in college football, returning four kickoffs for touchdowns (one return shy of the Big Ten Conference record of five) for the Michigan State Spartans in 24 games played. He earned first-team All-America honors after setting a Michigan State single-season record with three kickoff returns for touchdowns as a junior, which also tied an NCAA Division I record shared with six others.

== Professional career ==
=== National Football League ===
Cobb was selected by the Atlanta Falcons in the 2005 NFL draft in the sixth round with the 201st overall pick. Before the 2006 NFL season the Falcons released Cobb. He was signed by the Jacksonville Jaguars on December 22, 2006, but never played a game for them and was subsequently released.

=== Hamilton Tiger-Cats ===
Cobb was signed by the Hamilton Tiger-Cats on May 29, 2009. He was released on June 25, 2009, before being re-signed to the practice roster. He made his professional debut on July 10, 2009, in the Ti-Cats' victory over the BC Lions and was named the CFL's offensive player of the week. In the game, he ran for 110 yards over 14 carries and made 5 receptions for 75 yards including a 48-yard touchdown catch in the fourth quarter that gave Hamilton it 31–28 win; its first of the season and ended the Ti-Cats' nine-game losing streak against the Lions.

He rushed for over one thousand yards in both seasons with the Ticats (1207 and 1173.)

On March 1, 2011, Cobb was released by the Tiger-Cats.

=== Montreal Alouettes ===
Cobb was signed by the Montreal Alouettes on March 18, 2011.

After sustaining an injury in training camp, he was released by the Alouettes on July 12.

== Teaching ==
DeAndra' Cobb now works as a Physical Education teacher at Somerset Academy in Henderson, Nevada.

== See also ==
- List of college football yearly rushing leaders
