= Montee Ball =

American football player (born 1990)

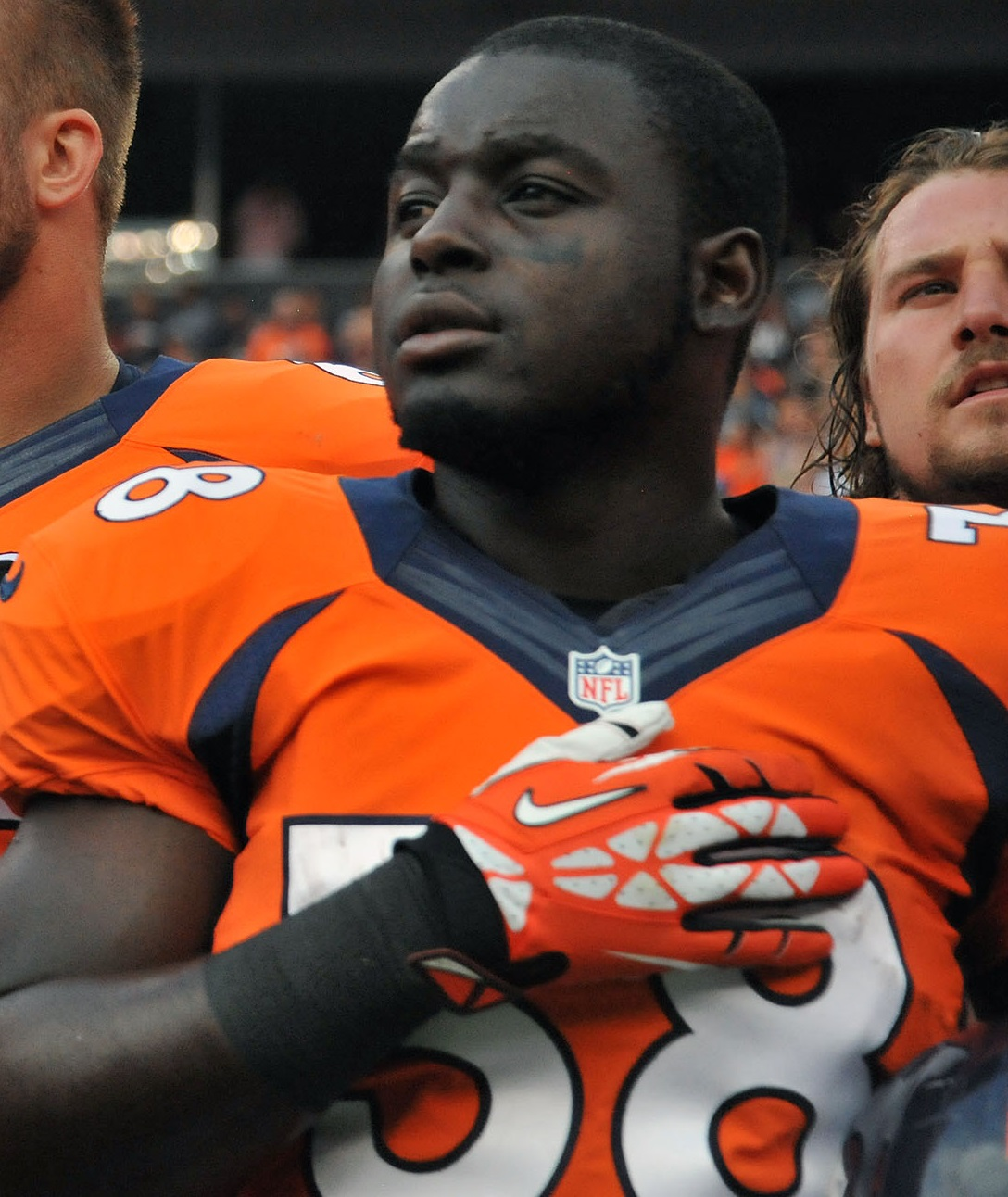
- Ball with the Denver Broncos in 2013

No. 28
- Position: Running back

Personal information
- Born: December 5, 1990 (age 35); McPherson, Kansas, U.S.
- Listed height: 5 ft 10 in (1.78 m)
- Listed weight: 215 lb (98 kg)

Career information
- High school: Timberland (Wentzville, Missouri)
- College: Wisconsin (2009–2012)
- NFL draft: 2013: 2nd round, 58th overall pick

Career history
- Denver Broncos (2013–2014); New England Patriots (2015)*
- * Offseason or practice squad member only

Awards and highlights
- Archie Griffin Award (2011); Doak Walker Award (2012); 2× Jim Brown Award (2011, 2012); 2× Consensus All-American (2011, 2012); NCAA rushing yards leader (2011); NCAA rushing touchdowns leader (2011); NCAA scoring leader (2011); Big Ten Most Valuable Player (2011); Big Ten Offensive Player of the Year (2011); 2× Big Ten Running Back of the Year (2011, 2012); 2× First-team All-Big Ten (2011, 2012)

Career NFL statistics
- Rushing yards: 731
- Rushing average: 4.2
- Rushing touchdowns: 5
- Receptions: 29
- Receiving yards: 207
- Stats at Pro Football Reference
- College Football Hall of Fame

Montee Ball Jr. (born December 5, 1990) is an American former professional football player who was a running back for the Denver Broncos of the National Football League (NFL). He played college football for the Wisconsin Badgers, twice earning consensus All-American honors. Until November 2015, Ball held NCAA Division I Football Bowl Subdivision (FBS) records for the most career rushing touchdowns with 77 and the most career total touchdowns with 83. He was selected by the Broncos in the second round of the 2013 NFL draft. He was inducted into the College Football Hall of Fame in 2025.

== Early life ==
Ball was born in McPherson, Kansas. His family later moved to Wentzville, Missouri, where Ball attended Timberland High School and played high school football for the Timberland Wolves. He was ranked as the number 33 running back in the nation and fourth-best player in Missouri by Rivals.com. He was named first-team all-state, all-metro, all-district and all-conference as a senior. As a senior, Ball carried the ball 213 times for 2,187 yards and 41 touchdowns. As a junior, Ball was named player of the year (The St. Louis American), first-team all-state, all-metro, all-district and all-conference after putting up 358 carries for 3,077 yards and 32 touchdowns, and was recognized in Sports Illustrated magazine's "Faces in the Crowd" section. As a sophomore, Ball was named first-team all-district and all-conference after carrying the ball 297 times for 1,845 yards and 15 touchdowns. As a freshman, Ball had 1,113 yards on 127 carries with 19 touchdowns. Ball was a team captain and team MVP as a sophomore, junior and senior. He holds the Wentzville school district rushing records with career totals of 995 carries, 8,222 yards, 107 touchdowns, and an average of 8.26 yards per carry. Ball was also named to the all-academic list three times and was a two-time letterwinner in basketball.

== College career ==
Ball enrolled at the University of Wisconsin–Madison, where he played for the Badgers football team from 2009 to 2012.

=== 2009 season ===
As a freshman, Ball played in 9 of 13 games and finished second on the team in rushing yards (391), rushing touchdowns (4), and rushing attempts (98).

=== 2010 season ===
Ball played in 12 games, including starts in the final four games. He began the 2010 season as the backup running back to John Clay, the 2009 Big Ten Offensive Player of the Year. Because Clay had offseason ankle surgery and later an MCL injury, Ball gained a prominent role in the Badgers' offense, along with freshman back James White. Ball led the team in rushing touchdowns, ranked second in rushing attempts and scoring, third in rushing yards and all purpose yards and fourth in total offense. His 18 rushing touchdowns tied for fourth-most in a single season, his 6.11 yards per carry is sixth-best in one season at Wisconsin, and his 108 points tied for sixth-most in one season at Wisconsin. At the end of the season, Ball was named consensus honorable mention All-Big Ten.

=== 2011 season ===
Ball played and started in all 14 games. In the season opener, he had 63 rushing yards, three rushing touchdowns, two receptions, 67 receiving yards, and a receiving touchdown against UNLV. On October 15, 2011, he was named Big Ten Offensive Player of the Week after throwing a 25-yard touchdown pass and scoring three rushing touchdowns with 142 yards rushing, including a career long 54-yard rush, on 14 carries and 46 yards receiving on one catch against Indiana.

On November 5, 2011, Ball was named Big Ten Player of the Week after rushing for a career-high 223 yards against the Purdue Boilermakers. During that game, Ball scored four touchdowns (three rushing and one receiving) which gave him 146 total points scored on the season. This broke Brian Calhoun's school record for total points in a single season of 144.

On November 12, 2011, Ball broke the single season Big Ten Conference record for touchdowns by rushing for two and receiving one against the Minnesota. Ball had 27 touchdowns (23 rushing and 4 receiving) at the end of that game.

On November 19, 2011, against Illinois, Ball ran for a career-high 224 yards and two touchdowns on a career-high 38 carries. He also added a receiving touchdown and became the fifth player in NCAA Division I FBS history to score 30 touchdowns in a single season.

On November 26, 2011, Ball scored four touchdowns against Penn State, and four more in the Big Ten Championship game one week later, giving Ball 38 touchdowns on the season, which was second all-time in FBS. He trails Oklahoma State's Barry Sanders, who scored 39 touchdowns in 1988.

Ball was one of three finalists for the 2011 Doak Walker Award joining Oregon's LaMichael James and Alabama's Trent Richardson. The award was given to Alabama's Trent Richardson.

Ball was named First-team All-Big Ten, by both the coaches and media, at the conclusion of the 2011 regular season. He was also the winner of two other Big Ten awards, the Graham-George Big Ten Offensive Player of the Year award (which was renamed in 2011 after of Northwestern's Otto Graham and Ohio State's Eddie George) and the Ameche-Dayne Big Ten Running Back of the Year award, which was also renamed in 2011 after Wisconsin's Alan Ameche and Ron Dayne.

On December 5, 2011, Ball was named one of five finalists for the Heisman Trophy. He was joined by Baylor quarterback Robert Griffin III, Stanford quarterback Andrew Luck, LSU cornerback Tyrann Mathieu and Alabama running back Trent Richardson. On the same day, Ball was named All-American by the AFCA, joining teammates Peter Konz and Kevin Zeitler. Ball was also named an All-American by CBS, again joined by teammate Peter Konz.

On December 8, 2011, Ball was named First-team All-American by Yahoo Sports. His teammates Peter Konz and Kevin Zeitler were named to the second-team and quarterback Russell Wilson and linebacker Chris Borland were named to the third-team.

On December 10, 2011, Ball was one of five finalists for the Heisman Trophy. He finished fourth in the voting, with 348 points (22-1st place, 83-2nd place and 116-3rd place points). Ball's fourth-place finish was the highest in Wisconsin history for a non-winner of the award, until Wisconsin running back Melvin Gordon finished second behind Oregon Ducks quarterback Marcus Mariota in 2014. He was joined by teammate Russell Wilson, who also received votes. Wilson finished ninth with 52 points. Baylor's Robert Griffin III won the award.

On January 2, 2012, Ball scored his 39th touchdown of the season, tying him with Barry Sanders for most touchdowns in a single FBS season. He finished the season with an NCAA-leading 1,923 rushing yards and 33 rushing touchdowns, while adding 24 receptions for 306 receiving yards and six touchdowns.

On January 5, 2012, Ball announced he would return for his senior year with the Badgers rather than enter the 2012 NFL draft.

=== 2012 season ===
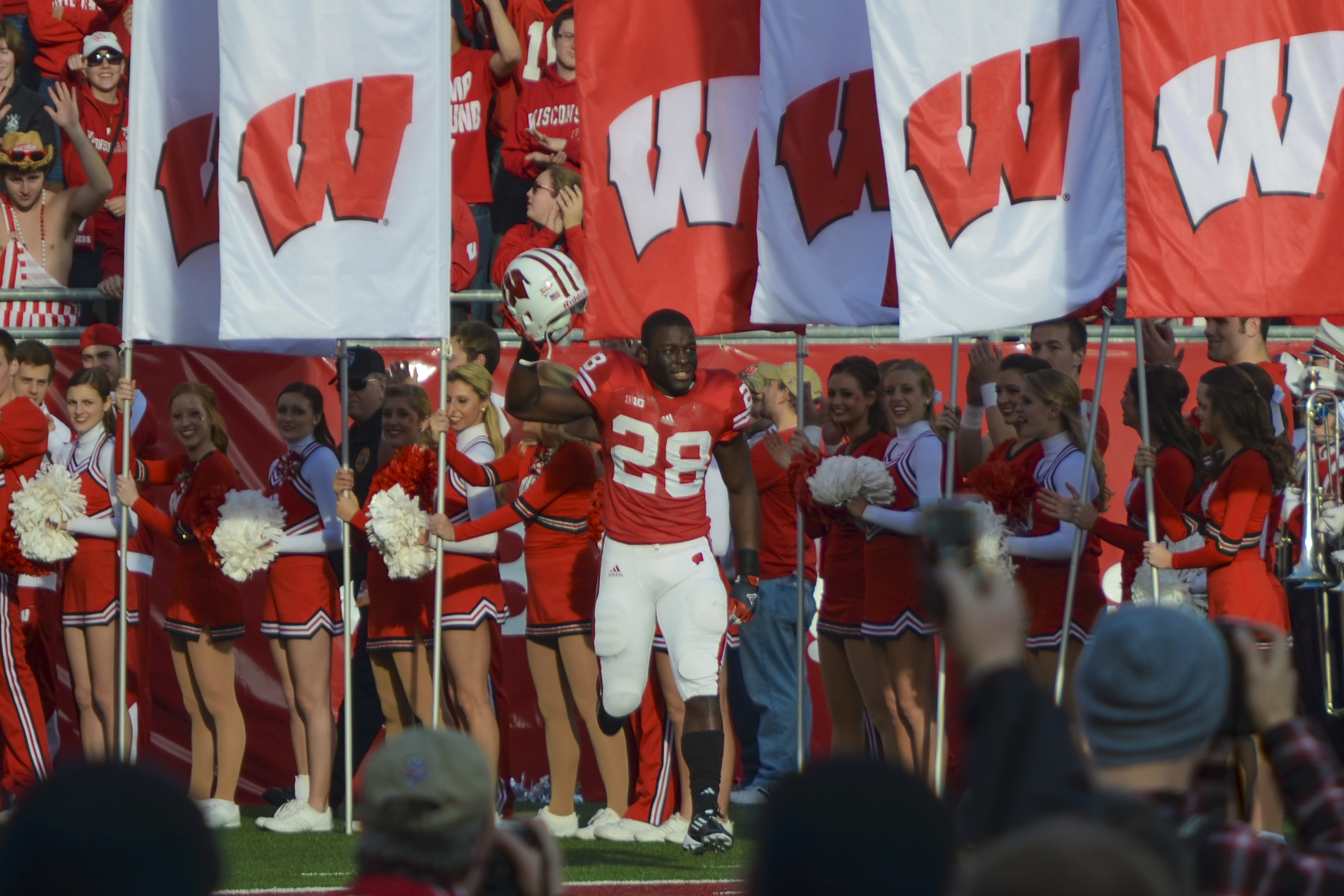
Senior Introductions vs Ohio State

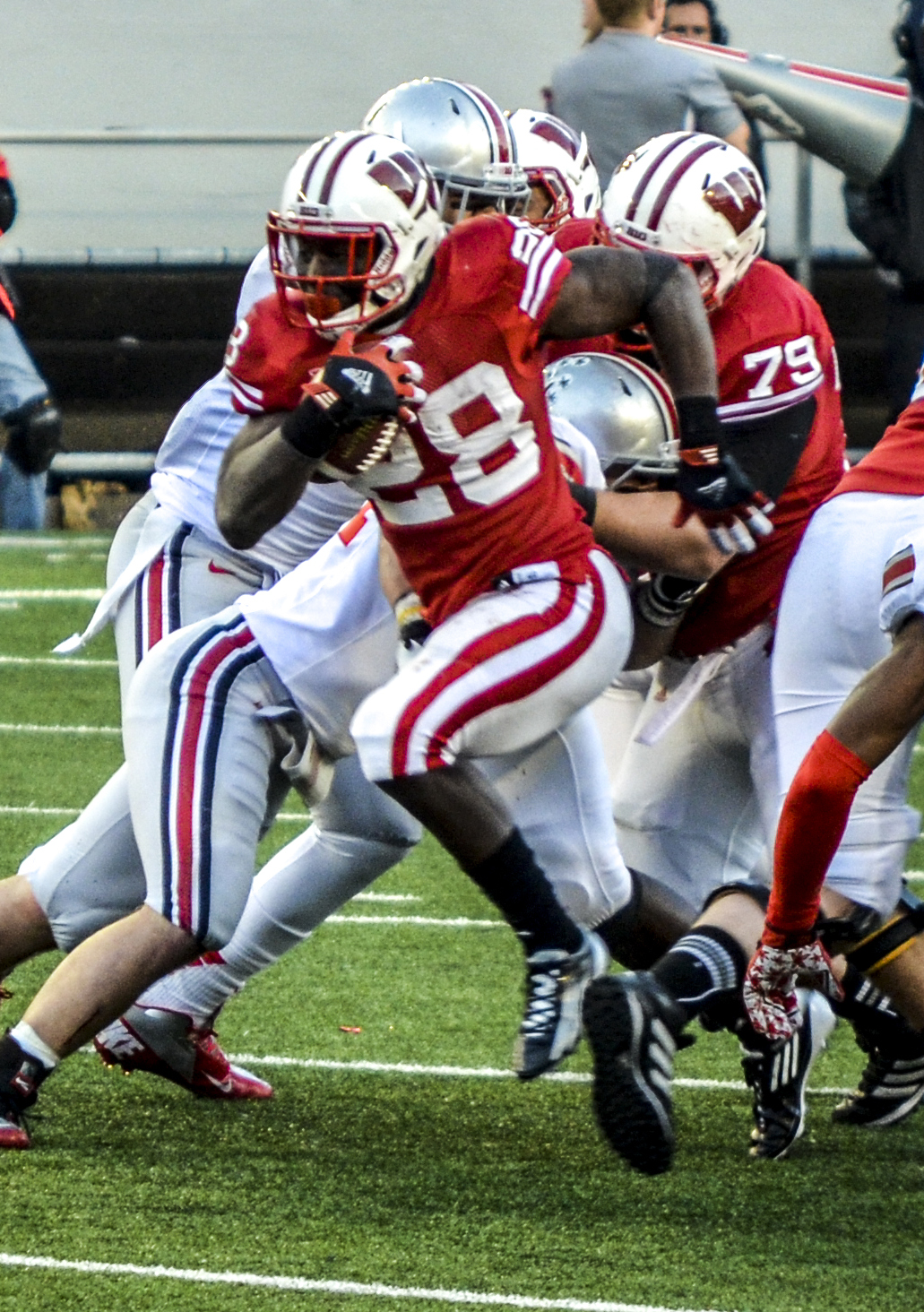
Ball in 2012

On October 13, 2012, Ball scored three rushing touchdowns against Purdue, giving Ball a career total of 72 touchdowns. This broke the Big Ten record and the Wisconsin record of 71 held by former Badgers running back Ron Dayne. He also ran for a career-high of 247 yards against the Boilermakers.

On November 24, 2012, Ball became the FBS career record holder for total touchdowns when he scored his 79th touchdown on a 17-yard run against Penn State.

On December 6, 2012, Ball won the Doak Walker Award, given to the nation's top running back. Ball became the second Badger to win the award. Ron Dayne won the award in 1999. He was named as a Consensus All-American.

On January 1, 2013, Ball became the first player in Rose Bowl Game history to score a touchdown in three straight years. Overall, he finished the season with 1,830 rushing yards and 22 rushing touchdowns.

=== Hall of Fame ===
On June 5, 2023, it was announced that Ball will be inducted into the University of Wisconsin's Athletic Hall of Fame for the class of 2023.

On June 5, 2023, Ball was announced as one of 78 FBS players to be selected for the 2024 College Football Hall of Fame ballot.

Ball will be inducted into the Rose Bowl Hall of Fame as a member of the 2025 class.

== Professional career ==
Pre-draft measurables
Height	Weight	Arm length	Hand span	40-yard dash	10-yard split	20-yard split	20-yard shuttle	Three-cone drill	Vertical jump	Broad jump	Bench press
5 ft 10 1/2 in (1.79 m)	214 lb (97 kg)	32 5/8 in (0.83 m)	9 in (0.23 m)	4.51 s	1.56 s	2.57 s	4.11 s	6.88 s	32 in (0.81 m)	9 ft 10 in (3.00 m)	15 reps
All values from NFL Combine/Pro Day

=== Denver Broncos ===
Ball was chosen in the second round with the 58th overall pick by the Denver Broncos in the 2013 NFL draft. In his NFL debut, Ball had eight carries for 24 yards in Denver's 49–27 win against the Baltimore Ravens. On October 27, 2013, Ball scored his first career touchdown on a 4-yard run against the Washington Redskins. On December 1, against the Kansas City Chiefs, Ball had his best game of his rookie season, with 13 carries for 117 yards, including a 45-yard run, the longest of his career. He had another rushing touchdown against the Tennessee Titans that sealed the game for Denver. Overall, he finished the 2013 season with 559 rushing yards and four rushing touchdowns.

Heading into his sophomore season, Ball was set to become the Broncos’ starting running back following the departure of Knowshon Moreno, who signed with the Miami Dolphins during the offseason. Despite this, Ball started in only three regular season games in 2014 and suffered a groin injury in Week 5, leading to the emergence of C. J. Anderson. He was placed on injured reserve on December 13, 2014, finishing the 2014 season with 172 yards and one touchdown, which was scored in a Week 1 victory over the Indianapolis Colts.

Ball entered the 2015 season with the Broncos fighting for a roster spot with fellow running backs C. J. Anderson, Ronnie Hillman, and Juwan Thompson. After rushing for only 68 yards on 32 carries in the preseason, the Broncos waived Ball on September 6, 2015.

=== New England Patriots ===
After being released and failing to find a new team quickly, Ball gained weight. He showed up to a tryout with the Green Bay Packers 30 pounds overweight. On December 15, 2015, the New England Patriots signed Ball to their practice squad, where he spent the rest of the season. On February 9, 2016, Ball was released by the Patriots following a domestic violence arrest.

== Career statistics ==
=== NFL ===
Year	Team	GP	Rushing						Receiving							Fumbles	
Year	Team	GP	Att	Yds	Avg	Lng	TD	FD	Rec	Tgt	Yds	Avg	Lng	TD	FD	Fum	Lost
2013	DEN	16	120	559	4.7	45	4	35	20	27	145	7.3	31	0	10	3	3
2014	DEN	5	55	172	3.1	23	1	9	9	13	62	6.9	16	0	2	1	1
Total		21	175	731	4.2	45	5	44	29	40	207	7.1	31	0	12	4	4

=== College ===
Legend
	Led the NCAA
**Bold**	Career high

Year	Team	Games		Rushing				Receiving			
Year	Team	GP	GS	Att	Yards	Avg	TD	Rec	Yards	Avg	TD
2009	Wisconsin	9	0	98	391	4.0	4	9	92	10.2	0
2010	Wisconsin	12	4	163	996	6.1	18	16	128	8.0	0
2011	Wisconsin	**14**	**14**	307	**1,923**	**6.3**	**33**	**24**	**306**	**12.8**	**6**
2012	Wisconsin	**14**	**14**	**356**	1,830	5.1	22	10	72	7.2	0
Career		49	32	924	5,140	5.6	77	59	598	10.1	6

== Career highlights ==
=== Awards and honors ===
College

- Archie Griffin Award (2011)
- Doak Walker Award (2012)
- 2× Jim Brown Award (2011, 2012)
- 2× Consensus All-American (2011, 2012)
- NCAA rushing yards leader (2011)
- NCAA rushing touchdowns leader (2011)
- NCAA scoring leader (2011)
- Big Ten Most Valuable Player (2011)
- Big Ten Offensive Player of the Year (2011)
- 2× Big Ten Running Back of the Year (2011, 2012)
- 2× First-team All-Big Ten (2011, 2012)
- University of Wisconsin Athletic Hall of Fame (2023)
- College Football Hall of Fame (2024)
- Rose Bowl Hall of Fame (2025)

=== Records ===
NCAA single season records

- Most touchdowns, season: 39 tied (2011)
- Most consecutive games with two or more touchdowns: 13 (2011)
- Most points scored by non-kicker: 236 (2011)

Big Ten single season records

- Most touchdowns: 39 (2011)

Wisconsin single season records

- Most touchdowns: 39 (2011)
- Most rushing touchdowns: 33 (2011)

== Personal life ==
Ball's parents are Montee Sr. and Melissa Ball. Ball's cousin, Darius Hill, played football at Ball State. Ball enjoys basketball, reading, and video games. Ball is a Christian.

Ball was assaulted in the early morning hours of August 1, 2012, while walking on University Avenue in Madison. The attackers were reported to be three black males unknown to Ball. During the early morning of February 5, 2016, Ball was arrested on a felony battery charge after an apparent dispute with his girlfriend. It was reported that Ball threw her onto a table, causing a cut on her leg, which required stitches. Ball was drunk during the incident.

On April 11, 2016, Ball was arrested in Walworth County, Wisconsin, for felony bail jumping while drinking alcohol, due to having felony bond conditions in Dane County, Wisconsin, not to consume alcohol or be in a bar or tavern.

Later in 2016, he accepted a plea deal for two cases involving domestic violence accusations and was sentenced to 60 days of house arrest, 18 months of probation and domestic violence and alcohol counseling.

Ball, like his father and grandfather, is a recovering alcoholic. Ball began showing up drunk to practice as a junior in college and continued the habit in his professional career. During the NFL season, Ball would get drunk on Sunday, Monday, Thursday, and Friday nights. His spiraling alcoholism and depression derailed his football career.

Ball has a son named Maverick who he credited with helping lift him from alcoholism and irresponsibility. He is now an Outreach Specialist for Wisconsin Voices of Recovery.

== See also ==
- List of NCAA Division I FBS running backs with at least 50 career rushing touchdowns
- List of NCAA Division I FBS running backs with at least 5,000 rushing yards
- List of NCAA major college football yearly rushing leaders
- List of NCAA major college football yearly scoring leaders
