= Art Luppino =

American football player

No. 22 – Arizona Wildcats
- Position: Tailback

Personal information
- Born: c. 1934/1935
- Listed height: 5 ft 9 in (1.75 m)
- Listed weight: 175 lb (79 kg)

Career information
- College: Arizona

Awards and highlights
- 2× NCAA rushing leader (1954, 1955); 2× Second-team All-PCC (1954, 1955); Nils V. "Swede" Nelson Award (1954); Arizona Wildcats Jersey No. 22 retired

Arthur E. Luppino (born c. 1934/1935), also known as the "Cactus Comet", is a former American football tailback. He played college football for the Arizona Wildcats and led all major-college players in rushing yardage in both 1954 and 1955. He broke the college football career record with 3,371 rushing yards, a record that stood until 1968. He also broke the modern-era, single-season scoring record with 166 points scored in 1954.

== Early life ==
Luppino was the son of a Navy officer, Salvatore Luppino. He grew up in Annapolis, Maryland, before his father was transferred to Coronado, California. Luppino became a surfer who was "agile and athletic, always the fastest runner in his school." He played shortstop for the baseball team at La Jolla High School and played fullback for the football team. He also worked as a lifeguard and later recalled that his conditioning from running rescue missions on the beach, rowing boats, and playing beach volleyball put him "light-years ahead of others in conditioning" when he got to college.

== Arizona Wildcats ==
The principal at La Jolla High School was a University of Arizona alumnus who alerted head coach Warren Woodson to Luppino's talent. Luppino was offered a scholarship and took a bus from San Diego to Tucson in the late summer of 1953. Luppino played college football as a tailback for Woodson's Arizona Wildcats football team from 1953 to 1956.

As a freshman in 1953, Luppino entered a game against New Mexico as a backup, gained 112 yards on seven carries. He concluded the 1953 season with 392 rushing yards on 59 carries, an average of 6.2 yards per carry.

As a sophomore in 1954, Luppino, who at the time was five feet and nine inches and weighed 175 pounds, led the country in rushing (1,359 yards), scoring (166 points), and kickoff returns (632 yards). His 166 points broke the NCAA modern-era record for single-season scoring. He rushed for over 100 yards in eight games during the 1954 season. On September 18, in the 1954 season opener, a 58-0 victory over New Mexico A&M, Luppino gained an average of 38 yards per carry, tallying 359 total yards (including punt and kickoff returns) and scored five touchdowns on runs of 37, 48, 74, and 53 yards, and an 88-yard kickoff return. He gained an average of 7.5 yards per rushing carry and gained a total of 2,188 yards in rushing, receiving, and kick returns. He also received the Nils V. "Swede" Nelson Award in 1954 for "outstanding achievement in academics, athletics, sportsmanship and citizenship", as well as second-team honors from the United Press on the 1954 All-Pacific Coast football team.

As a junior in 1955, Luppino again led the country in rushing, this time with 1,313 yards. He was the first player to lead the country in rushing for two consecutive seasons. For the second consecutive year, Luppino was selected by the United Press as a second-team player on its 1955 All-West Coast football team.

As a senior in 1956, Luppino was a team co-captain. He injured his knee prior to the opening game and a rib injury on the third play of the opening game. His playing time was limited through the 1956 season. Luppino said that he was able to run at average speed but could not "open up" at top speed without feeling a sharp pain in his knee. On October 20, 1956, he carried the ball three times for 54 yards to push him ahead of Alan Ameche for the NCAA's career rushing record. Luppino finished the 1956 season with 327 rushing yards and 36 points scored. His career rushing record of 3,371 yards stood for 12 years until Mercury Morris passed it in 1968.

== Professional football ==
Luppino played professional football in 1957 for the Tucson team in the Western Professional Football League. He attended the Washington Redskins camp in 1958, but his knee injury flared up, and he announced in August that he was abandoning his hopes of being a professional player.

== Later years ==
In the late 1960s, Luppino was a high school physical education teacher in Oceanside, California. In a 1969 interview, he claimed that the University of Arizona had refused to treat his knee injury and said he was still so angry that he tried to talk athletes out of attending the school. He continued to teach in the San Diego area for 22 years. He also owned a martial arts studio, a gun shop, and a golf club repair business.

In 1976, Luppino was one of the inaugural inductees into the Arizona Sports Hall of Fame. In 1999, Arizona retired Luppino's jersey no. 22. The jersey is on display in the end zone at Arizona's football stadium.

== See also ==
- List of NCAA major college football yearly rushing leaders
- List of NCAA major college football yearly scoring leaders
- List of NCAA major college yearly punt and kickoff return leaders
