= Ernest Anderson (American football) =

American football player (born 1960)

No. 34
- Position: Running back

Personal information
- Born: November 20, 1960 (age 65)
- Listed height: 5 ft 9 in (1.75 m)
- Listed weight: 195 lb (88 kg)

Career information
- College: Oklahoma State
- NFL draft: 1984: 3rd round, 74th overall pick

Career history
- Oklahoma/Arizona Outlaws (1984–1985); Detroit Lions (1985)*
- * Offseason or practice squad member only

Awards and highlights
- Second-team All-American (1982); First-team All-Big Eight (1982)

Ernest Anderson (born November 20, 1960) is an American former football running back in the National Football League (NFL) and United States Football League (USFL). He was selected in the third round by the Detroit Lions in 1984 but played for the Oklahoma/Arizona Outlaws. He played college football for the Oklahoma State Cowboys. He led the nation in rushing in 1982.

== See also ==
- List of college football yearly rushing leaders
