= Leon Burton =

American football player (1935–2022)

No. 24
- Position: Halfback

Personal information
- Born: March 13, 1935; Flint, Michigan, U.S.
- Died: October 7, 2022 (aged 87); Las Vegas, Nevada, U.S.
- Listed height: 5 ft 9 in (1.75 m)
- Listed weight: 172 lb (78 kg)

Career information
- High school: Flint Northern
- College: Arizona State (1955–1958)
- NFL draft: 1958: 8th round, 87th overall pick

Career history
- San Francisco 49ers (1959)*; New York Titans (1960); Ottawa Rough Riders (1963)*
- * Offseason or practice squad member only

Career AFL statistics
- Rushing yards: 119
- Rushing average: 7.4
- Receptions: 3
- Receiving yards: 8
- Total touchdowns: 3
- Stats at Pro Football Reference

Walter Leon Burton (March 13, 1935 – October 7, 2022) was an American professional football player who played 14 games for the New York Titans in one season of the American Football League (AFL) in 1960. He earlier played college football at Arizona State University.

== Early life ==
Burton was born in Flint, Michigan, on March 13, 1935. He attended Flint Northern High School in his hometown, where he was a member of the football and track and field teams. He then studied at Arizona State University, where he played for the Sun Devils from 1955 to 1958. He established the school's freshman record with 694 rushing yards in 1955 (a mark that would stand until 2003). During the 1957 season, Burton led the National Collegiate Athletic Association (NCAA) in rushing yards (1126), touchdowns (16), points (96), and yards from scrimmage (1320), while setting an NCAA record of 9.6 yards per carry. The Sun Devils ultimately finished that year undefeated (10–0). He had the fourth-most touchdowns (11) and points (66) in the NCAA in the following season. Burton received first team All-Border Conference honors in 1957 and 1958. He finished his college career ranked first all-time in regular-season rushing touchdowns (34), and second in rushing yards (2994). He was selected by the San Francisco 49ers in the eighth round (87th overall) of the 1958 NFL draft.

== Professional career ==
Burton was released by the 49ers on account of his size and subsequently joined the Toronto Argonauts for one season. He then signed with the New York Titans and made his AFL debut with the franchise on September 11, 1960, at the age of 25, in a 27–3 win against the Buffalo Bills. He recorded the longest kickoff return in franchise history at 101 yards in a game against the Oakland Raiders on October 28 that year, which was ultimately the second-longest kickoff return in the league that year. He later became the first Titans player to return two kickoffs for touchdowns in a single season. Burton led the AFL in kick returns (30), kick return yards (862), and kick and punt returns (42), while finishing second in kick and punt return yards (955), fifth in punt returns (12), and ninth in punt return yards (93). He went on to play for the Grand Rapids Blazers of the United Football League. He elected to stay in the town after the league folded and worked for many years with Meijer until retiring in 2000.

== Honors ==
Burton was inducted into his alma mater's Sports Hall of Fame in 1978. He was later recognized in ASU's Ring of Honor in October 2013.

== Personal life ==
Burton's first marriage was to Ellen Marie Collins, whom he met in high school, and together they had four children.

Burton died in his sleep on October 7, 2022, in Las Vegas. He was 87 years old.

== See also ==
- List of NCAA major college football yearly rushing leaders
- List of NCAA major college football yearly scoring leaders
