= Wilton Davis =

American football player (1929–2004)

Personal information
- Born: March 3, 1929; Austin, Texas, U.S.
- Died: January 15, 2004 (aged 74); Dallas, Texas, U.S.

Career information
- College: Hardin–Simmons University

Awards and highlights
- NCAA rushing leader, 1947

Wilton O. "Hook" Davis (March 3, 1929 – January 15, 2004) was an American football player. He played college football for Hardin–Simmons University.

Davis was born in 1929 in Austin, Texas. He attended Allan Junior High School and Austin High School. He was a two-year starter at fullback for the Austin High School football team. He was described as a "spinner man" in the Austin backfield and won a reputation for his passing and ball-carrying. He also played for the baseball, basketball, and track teams at Austin High.

Davis then enrolled at Hardin–Simmons in Abilene, Texas. He played college football as a fullback for Hardin-Simmons from. As a freshman in 1947, he led the nation in rushing yardage with 1,173 rushing yards, not including an additional 236 yards gained in a 53-0 victory over San Diego State in the Harbor Bowl. In 1948, he ranked fifth in rushing yardage with 889 yards and an average of 6.59 yards per carry. With Davis as the leading ground-gainer and Warren B. Woodson as head coach, Hardin-Simmons compiled a 14-5-3 record from 1947 to 1948. He gained 1,031 yard in 1948.

Aavis was also a leading hitter for the Hardin-Simmons baseball team. He was inducted into the Hardin-Simmons Athletic Hall of Fame in 1980 and was presented with an honorary doctorate in 1999.

After leaving Hardin-Simmons, Davis had a career in finance and banking. He moved to Dallas in 1964 and became the president of Fair Park National Bank. In 1970, he left the bank to become a real estate developer. He also served two terms as president of the Texas Baptist Men. During his time with that organization, he participated in the construction of 147 churches.

Davis was married for 53 years to Eddye Fouts Davis; she died in October 2003. Davis died three months later in January 2004 after a brief illness.

== See also ==
- List of college football yearly rushing leaders
