= Dave Casinelli =

American football player (1940–1987)

No. 30
- Position: Fullback

Personal information
- Born: May 23, 1940; West Virginia, U.S.
- Died: October 11, 1987 (aged 47); Leon County, Florida, U.S.
- Listed height: 5 ft 9 in (1.75 m)
- Listed weight: 200 lb (91 kg)

Career information
- College: Memphis State (1960–1963)

Awards and highlights
- Memphis Tigers No. 30 retired

David Anthony "Bull" Casinelli (May 23, 1940 – October 11, 1987), was an American football fullback. He played college football for the Memphis State Tigers from 1960 to 1963.

In 1963, Casinelli led Memphis State to an undefeated season and a #14 ranking in the final UPI Coaches' Poll. He also became the first Memphis State player to lead the NCAA in a major individual statistical category and the first Southern player to win the NCAA rushing title since John Dottley in 1949. Going into the final game of the 1963 season, he ranked third in rushing yardage but totaled 210 rushing yards in the final game to finish ahead of Jimmy Sidle and Gale Sayers. He led the NCAA for the 1963 season in rushing yardage (1,016 yards) and rushing carries (219). He also tied with Cosmo Iacavazzi for the national scoring title with 84 points, each having scored 14 touchdowns.

During his four years at Memphis State, Casinelli established school records with 2,796 total yards from scrimmage and 36 career touchdowns. In January 1964, he signed with the Edmonton Eskimos of the Canadian Football League. Casinelli died as the result of injuries sustained in an automobile accident in 1987 in Leon County, Florida.

== See also ==
- List of NCAA major college football yearly rushing leaders
- List of NCAA major college football yearly scoring leaders
