= Rudy Mobley =

American football player (1921–2003)

No. 81
- Positions: Halfback, defensive back

Personal information
- Born: December 8, 1921; Paducah, Texas, U.S.
- Died: September 7, 2003 (aged 81); Crescent, Oklahoma, U.S.
- Listed height: 5 ft 7 in (1.70 m)
- Listed weight: 155 lb (70 kg)

Career information
- High school: Paducah
- College: Hardin–Simmons (1942, 1946)
- NFL draft: 1945: 11th round, 107th overall pick

Career history
- Baltimore Colts (1947)

Awards and highlights
- 2× First-team Little All-American (1942, 1946); 2× NCAA rushing yards leader (1942, 1946)

Career AAFC statistics
- Rushing yards: 90
- Rushing average: 3.5
- Receptions: 11
- Receiving yards: 121
- Total touchdowns: 2
- Interceptions: 2
- Stats at Pro Football Reference

Rudolph Hamilton Mobley (December 8, 1921 – September 7, 2003), also known as "Little Doc", was an American football halfback. He played college football at Hardin–Simmons University. He twice led the NCAA major colleges in rushing yardage with 1,281 rushing yards in 1942 and 1,262 yards in 1946.

Mobley's football career was interrupted by military service during World War II; Mobley served from May 1943 to February 1946. With Mobley as the leading ground-gainer and Warren B. Woodson as head coach, Hardin-Simmons compiled a perfect 11–0 record in 1946.

Mobley was drafted by the Philadelphia Eagles of the National Football League (NFL) in the 11th round of the 1945 NFL draft, and played one season for the Baltimore Colts of the All-America Football Conference (AAFC) in 1947.

== See also ==
- List of NCAA major college football yearly rushing leaders
