= Kayo Lam =

American football player (1911–1993)

Profile
- Position: Halfback

Personal information
- Born: October 1, 1911; Glenrock, Wyoming, US
- Died: April 23, 1993 (aged 81); Denver, Colorado, US

Career information
- College: Colorado (1933–1935)

Awards and highlights
- 2× NCAA rushing leader (1934, 1935); Colorado Sports Hall of Fame

William Calvin "Kayo" Lam (October 1, 1911 – April 23, 1993) was a college football player. Lam was a prominent halfback for the Colorado Buffaloes football team, playing beside Byron White. He earned seven varsity letters at Colorado in football, track and wrestling. Lam led the nation in rushing yards in 1934 and 1935. He was the first CU athlete to play in a postseason all-star game (the East-West Shrine), and was inducted into the Colorado Sports Hall of Fame in 1978. Lam used tap dancing as a means of training.

After serving in World War II, he returned to Boulder, where he would work the next 36 years at the university, from assistant dean of men and assistant football coach to assistant athletic director and business manager.
