= Butch Colson =

- Colson and Clarence Stasavich

Profile
- Position: Fullback

Personal information
- Born: c. 1949; Elizabeth City, North Carolina, U.S.
- Listed height: 5 ft 10 in (1.78 m)
- Listed weight: 200 lb (91 kg)

Career information
- High school: Elizabeth City
- College: East Carolina (1966–1969)

Willard Horace "Butch" Colson (born c. 1949) is a former American football fullback. He played college football for East Carolina from 1966 to 1969. As a sophomore in 1967, he ranked fourth nationally among college players, and set a Southern Conference record, with 1,132 rushing yards. In three years at East Carolina, he tallied 2,512 rushing yards, 513 passing yards, and 27 touchdowns. He was selected as the Southern Conference Player of the Year in 1967 and was inducted into the East Carolina Athletics Hall of Fame in 1989.

== See also ==
- East Carolina Pirates football statistical leaders#Rushing
