= List of NCAA major college football yearly scoring leaders =

Snake Ames

The list of NCAA major college football yearly scoring leaders identifies the NCAA major college scoring leaders. Beginning with the 1937 college football season, when the NCAA began maintaining official records, the list includes each year's leaders both in total points scored and in points scored per game. The list is limited to players for major college programs, which includes the NCAA Division I Football Bowl Subdivision (2006–present), NCAA Division I-A (1978–2005), and NCAA University Division (1956–1977).

== Scoring leaders since 1937 ==
Year	Name	Points	Name	Points/Game
1937	Byron White (Colorado)	122	Byron White	15.25
1938	Parker Hall (Ole Miss)	73		
1939	Tom Harmon (Michigan)	102		
1940	Tom Harmon (Michigan)	117	Tom Harmon	14.63
1941	Bill Dudley (Virginia)	134	Bill Dudley	14.89
1942	Bob Steuber (Missouri)	121		
1943	Steve Van Buren (LSU)	98		
1944	Glenn Davis (Army)	120		
1945	Doc Blanchard (Army)	115		
1946	Gene Roberts (Chattanooga)	117		
1947	Lu Gambino (Maryland)	96		
1948	Fred Wendt (UTEP)	152	Fred Wendt	15.20
1949	George Thomas (Oklahoma)	117		
1950	Bobby Reynolds (Nebraska)	157	Bobby Reynolds	17.44
1951	Ollie Matson (San Francisco)	126		
1952	Jackie Parker (Mississippi State)	120		
1953	Earl Lindley (Utah State)	81		
1954	Art Luppino (Arizona)	166	Art Luppino	16.60
1955	Jim Swink (TCU)	125		
1956	Clendon Thomas (Oklahoma)	108		
1957	Leon Burton (Oklahoma)	96		
1958	Dick Bass (Pacific)	116		
1959	Pervis Atkins (New Mexico State)	107		
1960	Bob Gaiters (New Mexico State)	145	Bob Gaiters	14.50
1961	Preacher Pilot (New Mexico State)	138	Preacher Pilot	13.80
1962	Jerry Logan (West Texas State)	110		
1963	Cosmo Iacavazzi (Princeton); Dave Casinelli (Memphis State)	84		
1964	Brian Piccolo (Wake Forest)	111		
1965	Howard Twilley (Tulsa)	127		
1966	Ken Hebert (Houston)	113		
1967	Leroy Keyes (Purdue)	114		
1968	Jim O'Brien (Cincinnati)	142	Jim O'Brien	14.20
1969	Steve Owens (Oklahoma)	138	Steve Owens	13.80
1970	Don McCauley (North Carolina)	126	Brian Bream (Air Force); Gary Kosins (Dayton)	12.0; 12.0
1971	Lydell Mitchell (Penn State)	174	Ed Marinaro	16.44
1972	Harold Henson (Ohio State)	120	Harold Henson	12.0
1973	Jim Jennings (Rutgers)	128	Jim Jennings	11.6
1974	Keith Barnette (Boston College)	134	Billy Marek (Wisconsin)	12.7
1975	Pete Johnson (Ohio State)	150	Pete Johnson	13.6
1976	Tony Dorsett (Pittsburgh)	134	Tony Dorsett	12.2
1977	Earl Campbell (Texas)	114	Earl Campbell	10.4
1978	Billy Sims (Oklahoma)	120	Billy Sims	10.9
1979	Billy Sims (Oklahoma)	132	Billy Sims	12.0
1980	Sammy Winder (Southern Miss)	120	Sammy Winder	10.9
1981	Marcus Allen (USC)	120	Marcus Allen	12.5
1982	Greg Allen (Florida State)	126	Greg Allen	11.5
1983	Mike Rozier (Nebraska)	174	Mike Rozier	14.50
1984	Keith Byars (Ohio State)	144	Keith Byars	13.1
1985	Bernard White (Bowling Green)	114	Bernard White	10.4
1986	Steve Bartalo (Colorado State)	114	Steve Bartalo	10.4
1987	Paul Hewitt (San Diego State)	144	Paul Hewitt	12.0
1988	Barry Sanders (Oklahoma State)	234	Barry Sanders	21.27
1989	Anthony Thompson (Indiana)	154	Anthony Thompson	14.20
1990	Stacey Robinson (Northern Illinois)	120	Stacey Robinson	10.9
1991	Marshall Faulk (San Diego State)	140	Marshall Faulk (San Diego State)	15.56
1992	Garrison Hearst (Georgia)	126	Garrison Hearst	11.5
1993	Marshall Faulk (San Diego State)	144	Bam Morris (Texas Tech)	12.2
1994	Rashaan Salaam (Colorado)	144	Rashaan Salaam	13.1
1995	Eddie George (Ohio State)	144	Eddie George	12.0
1996	Corey Dillon (Washington)	138	Corey Dillon	12.6
1997	Randy Moss (Marshall); Skip Hicks (UCLA)	156	Skip Hicks	13
1998	Troy Edwards (Louisiana Tech)	188	Troy Edwards	15.7
1999	Shaun Alexander (Alabama)	144	Shaun Alexander	13.1
2000	Lee Suggs (Virginia Tech)	168	Lee Suggs	15.27
2001	Luke Staley (BYU)	170	Luke Staley	15.45
2002	Brock Forsey (Boise State)	192	Brock Forsey	14.77
2003	Cedric Benson (Texas)	134	Patrick Cobbs	11.5
2004	Tyler Jones (Boise State)	141	Tyler Jones	11.8
2005	LenDale White (USC)	156	Steve Slaton (West Virginia)	16.3
2006	Ian Johnson (Boise State)	152	Ian Johnson	15.2
2007	Kevin Smith (UCF)	180	Kevin Smith	15.0
2008	Jeff Wolfert (Missouri)	133	Dez Bryant (Oklahoma State)	16.0
2009	Toby Gerhart (Stanford)	166	Donald Buckram (UTEP)	15.8
2010	Dan Bailey (Oklahoma State)	149	Mikel Leshoure (Illinois)	13.6
2011	Montee Ball (Wisconsin)	236	Montee Ball	16.86
2012	Kenneth Dixon (Louisiana Tech)	168	Kenneth Dixon	16.8
2013	Keenan Reynolds (Navy)	188	Kapri Bibbs (Colorado State)	18.6
2014	Jarvion Franklin (Western Michigan)	150	Samaje Perine (Oklahoma)	14.0
2015	Derrick Henry (Alabama)	168	Kenneth Dixon (Louisiana Tech)	17.0
2016	Anthony Wales (Western Kentucky)	174	Ryan Nall (Oregon State)	15.0
2017	Devin Singletary (Florida Atlantic)	198	Royce Freeman (Oregon)	16.0
2018	Travis Etienne (Clemson)	156	Devin Singletary (Florida Atlantic); Darrell Henderson (Memphis); Jonathan Taylor (Wisconsin)	13.0
2019	Jonathan Taylor (Wisconsin)	156	Jamale Carothers (Navy)	16.0
2020	Najee Harris (Alabama)	180	Jaret Patterson (Buffalo)	19.0
2021	Rasheen Ali (Marshall)	150	Rasheen Ali (Marshall)	11.54
2022	Jack Podlesny (Georgia)	151	Jake Moody (Michigan)	10.50
2023	Blake Corum (Michigan)	168	Blake Corum (Michigan)	11.20
2024	Bryson Daily (Army)	192	Bryson Daily (Army)	13.71
2025	Caleb Hawkins (North Texas)	174	Caleb Hawkins (North Texas)	13.38

== Pre-1937 unofficial data ==
Before 1937 the NCAA did not compile official statistics. This chart reflects unofficial scoring statistics for years prior to 1937.

Year	Name	Points	Name	Points/Game
1883	Alex Moffat (Princeton)	136		
1884				
1885				
1886	Harry Beecher (Yale)	132		
1887	Snake Ames (Princeton)	219	Snake Ames	24.3
1888	Snake Ames (Princeton)	234	Snake Ames	19.5
1889	Bum McClung (Yale)	176		
1890	Philip King (Princeton)	145		
1891	Bernard Trafford (Harvard)	270		
1892	Philip King (Princeton)	105		
1893				
1894				
1895				
1896				
1897				
1898				
1899				
1900				
1901	Bruce Shorts (Michigan)	123		
1902	Al Herrnstein (Michigan)	130		
1903	Thomas S. Hammond (Michigan)	163		
1904				
1905				
1906				
1907				
1908	Doc Fenton (LSU)	132		
1909				
1910				
1911				
1912	Jim Thorpe (Carlisle)	224		
1913	Johnny Spiegel (Washington & Jefferson)	127		
1914	Buck Mayer (Virginia)	142		
1915	Neno DaPrato (Michigan Aggies)	185	Neno Daprato	30.8
1916	Johnny Gilroy (Georgetown)	160		
1917	Bill Ingram (Navy)	162	Bill Ingram	20.25
1918				
1919	Ira Rodgers (West Virginia)	147		
1920	Jimmy Leech (VMI)	210	Jimmy Leech	23.3
1921				
1922	"Bots" Brunner (Lafayette)	86		
1923	George Pfann (Cornell)	98		
1924	Heinie Benkert (Rutgers)	100		
1925	Peggy Flournoy (Tulane)	128		
1926	Mayes McLain (Haskell) or Fred Koster (Louisville)	253 or 124	Mayes McLain	23.0
1927	Jimmy Armistead (Vanderbilt)	138		
1928	Ken Strong (NYU)	161	Ken Strong	16.1
1929	Gene McEver (Tennessee)	130		
1930	Leonard Macaluso (Colgate)	145		
1931	Bob Campiglio (West Liberty)	145		
1932	Lou Bush (Mass. St.)	114		
1933	Beattie Feathers (Tennessee)	78		
1934	Bill Shepherd (Western Maryland)	133		
1935	Ray Zeh (Western Reserve)	112		
1936	Norm Schoen; Baldwin-Wallace	117		
