= Roger Craig (American football) =

American football player (born 1960)

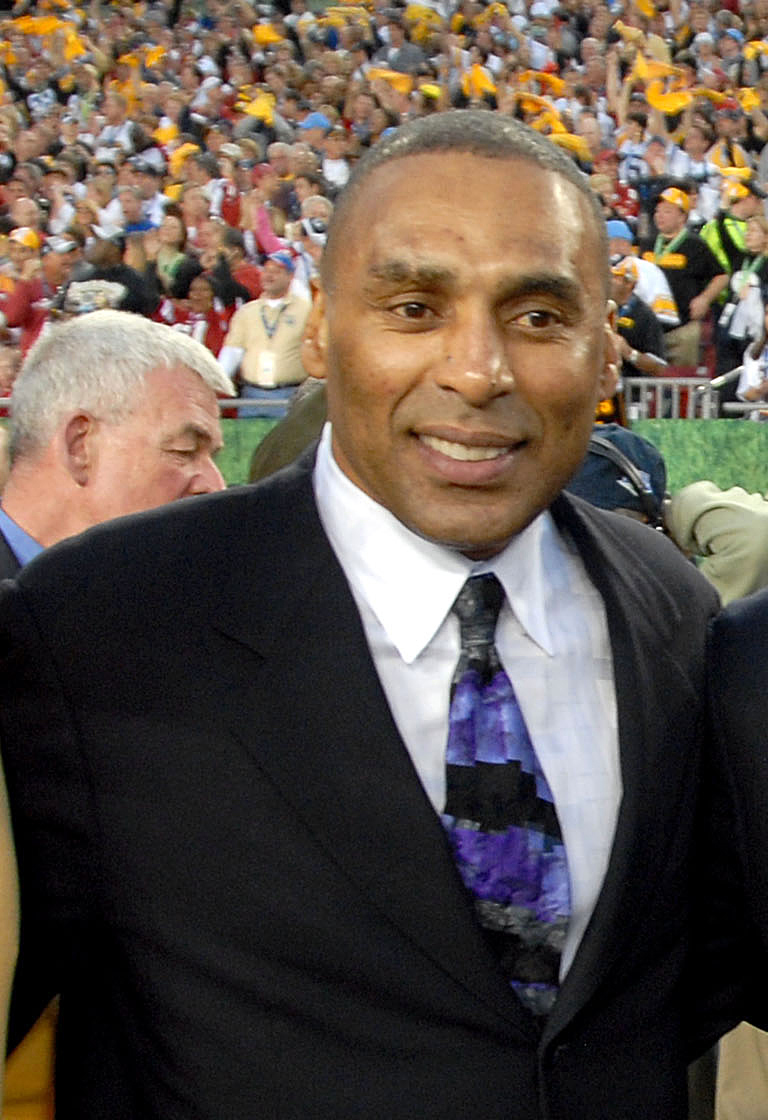
- Craig at Super Bowl XLIII in 2009

No. 33, 22
- Positions: Running back, fullback

Personal information
- Born: July 10, 1960 (age 66); Preston, Mississippi, U.S.
- Listed height: 6 ft 0 in (1.83 m)
- Listed weight: 222 lb (101 kg)

Career information
- High school: Davenport Central (Davenport, Iowa)
- College: Nebraska (1979–1982)
- NFL draft: 1983: 2nd round, 49th overall pick

Career history
- San Francisco 49ers (1983–1990); Los Angeles Raiders (1991); Minnesota Vikings (1992–1993)

Awards and highlights
- 3× Super Bowl champion (XIX, XXIII, XXIV); NFL Offensive Player of the Year (1988); First-team All-Pro (1988); Second-team All-Pro (1985); 4× Pro Bowl (1985, 1987–1989); Jim Thorpe Trophy (1988); NFL receptions leader (1985); NFL 1980s All-Decade Team; San Francisco 49ers Hall of Fame; Second-team All-Big Eight (1981)

Career NFL statistics
- Games played: 165
- Games started: 133
- Rushing yards: 8,189
- Rushing average: 4.1
- Receptions: 566
- Receiving yards: 4,911
- Total touchdowns: 73
- Stats at Pro Football Reference
- Pro Football Hall of Fame

Roger Timothy Craig (born July 10, 1960) is an American former professional football player who was a running back in the National Football League (NFL). He played for the San Francisco 49ers, Los Angeles Raiders and Minnesota Vikings. Craig went to four Pro Bowls and won three Super Bowls with the 49ers. He was the first NFL player to have 1,000 yards rushing and receiving in the same season. Marshall Faulk and Christian McCaffrey are the only other players to have accomplished that feat. Craig currently works as the VP of Business Development at TIBCO Software. He was elected into the Pro Football Hall of Fame as a member of the Class of 2026.

== Early life ==
Born in Preston, Mississippi, Craig's parents relocated to Davenport, Iowa, where he attended Davenport Community Schools. For Middle School, Craig attended J.B. Young Intermediate in Davenport, where he played on the school's football team. He later attended Central High School in Davenport, Iowa, graduating in 1979. There, he was teammates with future NFL tight end Jamie Williams. His older brother, Curtis Craig, had also played running back, graduating from Central in 1974. The Craig brothers were preceded at running back for Central by future Denver Broncos running back Jim Jensen. The 1976 team, with Roger Craig and Williams, won the Iowa State Championship under Coach Jim Fox. As a senior in 1978, Craig rushed for 1,565 yards and 27 touchdowns, earning prep All-America honors. In his final high school game, a playoff loss, Craig rushed for 353 yards and four touchdowns.

Craig was an all-around athlete, also competing in wrestling and track. In wrestling, he was an Iowa State Championships qualifier. On the track, Craig finished second in the Iowa State Track and Field Championships in both the 110 hurdles and the 400 hurdles as a senior in 1979. Craig broke the school record in the 110 hurdles that had been set by Jim Jensen. Craig credited 10-time State Champion Coach Ira Dunsworth with helping develop his distinctive high-knee running form. Craig's time of 14.43 in the 110 hurdles is still listed among the All-Time Bests at the Iowa State Track and Field Championships.

== College career ==
Craig followed in the footsteps of Curtis Craig and Jamie Williams to graduate from Davenport Central and then attend Nebraska to play for Coach Tom Osborne. Williams went on to an NFL career as well and Curtis Craig was an All-Big 8 Player in 1977.

Roger Craig played three full seasons for the University of Nebraska. In his Nebraska career, Craig rushed for 2,446 yards and 26 touchdowns, with an average of six yards per carry. He was an integral running back in Osborne's I-formation option offense.

After playing mainly for the freshman squad in 1979, Craig rushed for 769 yards and 15 touchdowns as a sophomore in 1980. As a junior in 1981, he had 173 carries for 1,060 yards and six touchdowns. Craig was also fourth on the team with 12 receptions for 87 yards and was named to the All-Big 8 Team. In 1982, he teamed up with Mike Rozier in the backfield, but was injured early in the season and lost playing time while injured, but came back with 127 rushing yards in the final regular season game.

Teammates of Craig during his tenure at Nebraska include quarterbacks Jeff Quinn and Turner Gill; running backs Jarvis Redwine, I.M. Hipp, Andra Franklin, Craig Johnson, Jeff Smith and eventual Heisman Trophy winner Mike Rozier; tackle Dean Steinkuhler (#2 overall pick in 1984 NFL Draft); wide receiver Irving Fryar (#1 overall pick in 1984 NFL Draft) and his hometown friend, tight end Jamie Williams. Craig also ran one season of indoor track at Nebraska, finishing fourth in the 60 Meter hurdles at the Big 8 Indoor Championships.

== Professional career ==
=== San Francisco 49ers ===
Craig was drafted by the San Francisco 49ers in the second round (49th overall) selection in the 1983 NFL draft.

As a rookie in 1983 playing under Bill Walsh and alongside Quarterback Joe Montana, Craig scored a combined 12 touchdowns rushing and receiving, as the 49ers reached the NFC Championship Game. Montana, Craig, and Walsh would remain together until the 1988 season. Craig first became well known in his rookie year for his distinctive high-knee running technique. He is featured in the Dire Straits 'Walk of Life' video at the 3:13 mark.

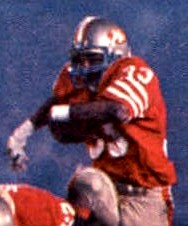
Craig rushing in Super Bowl XIX

In Super Bowl XIX in January 1985, Craig rushed for 58 yards, caught seven passes for 77 yards, and became the first player to score three touchdowns in a Super Bowl during the 49ers' 38–16 victory over the Miami Dolphins.

The following season, Craig became the first in NFL history to run and receive for at least 1,000 yards in the same season. He ran for 1,050 yards on 214 carries and led the NFL with 92 catches for 1,016 yards, and scored a team high 15 touchdowns. With fullback Tom Rathman, also from Nebraska, the two formed the 49ers' "Cornfield Backfield."

In 1988, Craig was named NFL Offensive Player of the Year by the Associated Press. He ran for a career-high 1,502 yards and caught an additional 76 passes for 534 yards. A memorable game occurred in week 7 against the Los Angeles Rams. He scored three rushing touchdowns and ran a career-high 191 yards. He went on to assist the 49ers to Super Bowl XXIII by amassing 262 combined rushing and receiving yards and two touchdowns in their two playoff games. In the 49ers' 20–16 win over Cincinnati in that Super Bowl, he rushed for 71 yards and caught eight passes for 101 yards, making him the first running back have to have 100 receiving yards in a Super Bowl.

In the 1989 season, the 49ers advanced to the Super Bowl for the second year in a row, aided by Craig's 1,527 combined rushing/receiving yards and seven touchdowns in the season, along with his 240 combined rushing/receiving yards and two touchdowns in their two playoff games. In San Francisco's 55–10 win over the Denver Broncos in Super Bowl XXIV, Craig rushed for 69 yards, caught five passes for 34 yards, and scored a touchdown.

The 49ers were 14–2 in the following regular season on their quest to become the first team to win three consecutive Super Bowls. In the NFC Championship Game (his last as a 49er), a hit by Giants nose tackle Erik Howard caused Craig to fumble the football that was recovered by Giants linebacker Lawrence Taylor late in the fourth quarter while the 49ers were trying to hold on to a 13–12 lead over the New York Giants. After the fumble recovery, the Giants scored on a last-second field goal to win 15–13, and went on to win Super Bowl XXV.

In eight seasons with the 49ers, Craig played in 121 games and missed only seven games, five of them in his final season. Playing alongside Dwight Clark, Jerry Rice, Tom Rathman, Russ Francis and others in the 49ers diverse offense, Craig accounted for 11,506 yards from scrimmage, rushing for 7064 yards (4.2) and 50 touchdowns, and catching 508 passes for 4,442 yards and 16 touchdowns. In 16 playoff games with the 49ers, Craig had 817 rushing yards and seven touchdowns and 63 receptions for 606 yards (9.7) and two touchdowns, as the 49ers won three Super Bowls.

=== Los Angeles Raiders ===
Craig left San Francisco and signed with the Los Angeles Raiders in 1991. Sharing time with Marcus Allen and Nick Bell, Craig led the Raiders in rushing as he rushed for 590 yards and had 17 receptions for 136 yards. The Raiders finished 9–7 under head coach Art Shell and lost to the Kansas City Chiefs in the playoffs.

=== Minnesota Vikings ===
Craig played his final two seasons with the Minnesota Vikings. Playing behind Terry Allen in 1992, Craig rushed for 416 yards and four touchdowns and caught 22 passes for 161 yards. The Vikings finished 11–5 and won the NFC Central Division, but were defeated by the Washington Redskins in the playoffs.

In his final season, Craig split time with Barry Word, Scottie Graham, and Robert Smith as the Vikings finished 9–7, losing to the New York Giants in the playoffs. Craig rushed for 119 yards and 1 touchdown, catching 19 passes for 169 yards and 1 touchdown.

=== Retirement ===
Craig announced his retirement after the 1993 season, signing a one-day contract with the 49ers so he could retire as a 49er.

== Career statistics ==
Legend
	AP NFL Offensive Player of the Year
	Won the Super Bowl
	Led the league
**Bold**	Career high

=== NFL ===
==== Regular season ====
Year	Team	Games		Rushing				Receiving				Total Yds			Total TD	Fum
Year	Team	GP	GS	Att	Yds	Avg	TD	Rec	Yds	Avg	TD	Touch	Y/T	Yds	Total TD	Fum
1983	SF	16	13	176	725	4.1	8	48	427	8.9	4	224	5.1	1,152	12	6
1984	SF	16	16	155	649	4.2	7	71	675	9.5	3	226	5.9	1,324	10	3
1985	SF	16	16	214	1,050	**4.9**	**9**	**92**	**1,016**	**11.0**	**6**	306	**6.8**	**2,066**	**15**	5
1986	SF	16	15	204	830	4.1	7	81	624	7.7	0	285	5.1	1,454	7	4
1987	SF	14	14	215	815	3.8	3	66	492	7.5	1	281	4.7	1,307	4	5
1988	SF	16	15	**310**	**1,502**	4.8	**9**	76	534	7.0	1	**386**	5.3	**2,036**	10	**8**
1989	SF	16	16	271	1,054	3.9	6	49	473	9.7	1	320	4.8	1,527	7	4
1990	SF	11	11	141	439	3.1	1	25	201	8.0	0	166	3.9	640	1	2
1991	LA	15	13	162	590	3.6	1	17	136	8.0	0	179	4.1	726	1	2
1992	MIN	15	1	105	416	4.0	4	22	164	7.5	0	127	4.6	580	4	2
1993	MIN	14	3	38	119	3.1	1	19	169	8.9	1	57	5.1	288	2	1
Career		165	133	1,991	8,189	4.1	56	566	4,911	8.7	17	2,557	5.1	13,100	73	42

==== Postseason ====
Year	Team	Games		Rushing				Receiving				Total Yds			Total TD	Fum
Year	Team	GP	GS	Att	Yds	Avg	TD	Rec	Yds	Avg	TD	Touch	Y/T	YSlds	Total TD	Fum
1983	SF	2	2	10	16	1.6	1	10	76	7.6	0	20	4.6	92	1	1
1984	SF	3	3	33	136	4.1	1	11	108	9.8	**2**	44	5.5	244	**3**	0
1985	SF	1	1	9	23	2.6	0	2	18	9.0	0	11	3.7	41	0	0
1986	SF	1	1	5	17	3.4	0	4	22	5.5	0	9	4.3	39	0	1
1987	SF	1	1	7	17	2.4	0	9	78	8.7	0	16	5.9	95	0	0
1988	SF	3	3	56	274	**4.9**	2	**13**	**160**	**12.3**	0	69	**6.3**	**434**	2	**2**
1989	SF	3	3	**62**	**288**	4.6	**3**	8	74	9.3	0	**70**	5.2	362	**3**	1
1990	SF	2	2	20	46	2.3	0	6	70	11.7	0	26	4.5	116	0	**2**
1991	LA	0	0	did not play												
1992	MIN	1	0	5	23	4.6	0	—	—	—	—	5	4.6	23	0	0
1993	MIN	1	0	1	1	1.0	0	—	—	—	—	1	1.0	1	0	0
Career		18	16	208	841	4.0	7	63	606	9.6	2	271	5.3	1,447	9	7

=== College ===
Season	Team	Rushing					Receiving				
Season	Team	Att	Yds	Avg	Lng	TD	Rec	Yds	Avg	Lng	TD
1979	Nebraska	7	31	4.4	8	0	0	0	0.0	0	0
1980	Nebraska	108	769	**7.1**	61	**15**	0	0	0.0	0	0
1981	Nebraska	**173**	**1,060**	6.1	**94**	6	**12**	**87**	**7.3**	**17**	0
1982	Nebraska	119	586	4.9	34	5	4	15	3.8	11	0
Totals		407	2,446	6.0	94	26	16	102	6.4	17	0

== Legacy ==
Craig appeared in the NFL playoffs every year of his career, except for 1991 (he did not play due to injury even though his team qualified), and made the Pro Bowl four times (1985, 1987–1989). Craig finished his 11 NFL seasons with 8,189 rushing yards, 566 receptions for 4,911 yards, and three kickoff returns for 43 yards. Overall, Craig amassed 13,143 total yards and scored 73 touchdowns (56 rushing and 17 receiving).

Craig was the first running back to gain more than 1,000 yards rushing and 1,000 yards receiving in the same season (1985). Since then, only two other running backs have achieved the same feat (Marshall Faulk in 1999, and Christian McCaffrey in 2019). Craig also caught a then-record 92 passes in the 1985 campaign. In 1988, Craig set a then-franchise record 1,502 yards rushing (Garrison Hearst broke the record with 1,570 yards in 1998. Frank Gore holds the current record with 1,695 yards in 2006). The 1988 season was the second time Craig broke the 2,000 combined yardage mark in his career.

Craig, Lydell Mitchell, and Chuck Foreman are the only running backs to lead the NFL in receptions for a single season.

Craig is one of three running backs to ever record 100 receiving yards or more in a Super Bowl (James White, New England Patriots, Super Bowl 51; Corey Clement, Philadelphia Eagles, Super Bowl 52). His prowess as a receiver out of the backfield is a contrast to his college career, where he caught only 16 passes during his three seasons at Nebraska.

In 1993, Peter King (in Inside the Helmet) reported that Craig was the only running back to be elected to the Pro Bowl at both fullback and halfback.

== Honors ==
- In 1987, Craig was inducted into the Quad City Sports Hall of Fame.
- Craig was Inducted into the Davenport Central High School Hall of Honor in 1989.
- In 1989, Craig was inducted into the Des Moines Register's Sunday Register Hall of Fame.
- Craig was inducted into the Nebraska Football Hall of Fame in 1989.
- In 2002, Craig was inducted into the Iowa's IHSAA Football Players' Hall-of-Fame. (His brother, Curtis Craig, was subsequently inducted in 2003).
- Craig was inducted into the Bay Area Sports Hall of Fame (BASHOF) in 2008.
- Craig is a member of the San Francisco 49ers Hall of Fame.
- Craig was selected as a running back on the National Football League 1980s All-Decade Team, alongside Walter Payton, Eric Dickerson and John Riggins.
- Craig was named one of 25 semifinalists considered for the Pro Football Hall of Fame's Class of 2009 and one of the 15 modern-era finalists for the Class of 2010. In 2026, Craig was elected as part of the Pro Football Hall of Fame's Class of 2026 on the Senior Committee.
- In 2019, the Professional Football Researchers Association named Craig to the PFRA Hall of Very Good Class of 2019.
- Elected into the Pro Football Hall of Fame as a member of the Class of 2026.

== Personal life ==
Craig spent several years studying Tae Kwon Do under Chris Jensen and Debbie Pederson at Golden State Tae Kwon Do in Foster City (now in San Carlos). He is an avid runner and has participated in over 38 marathons and half-marathons.

Craig was the grand marshal for the 2010 Toyota/Save Mart 350 at Sonoma Raceway.

Craig is a distant cousin of New York Jets running back Breece Hall.

Craig married his wife Vernessia, the sister of boxer Michael Nunn, on May 7, 1983. They have 5 children.

Craig eventually worked for Tibco Consulting in his post-football professional career.

On August 8, 2026, Craig announced he had been diagnosed with Vascular dementia.
