= 1982 All-Big Eight Conference football team =

American all-star college football team

The 1982 All-Big Eight Conference football team consists of American football players chosen by various organizations for All-Big Eight Conference teams for the 1982 NCAA Division I-A football season. The selectors for the 1982 season included the Associated Press (AP) and United Press International (UPI).

== Offensive selections ==
=== Quarterbacks ===
- Turner Gill, Nebraska (AP-1; UPI-1)
- Darrell Dickey, Kansas State (AP-2)

=== Running backs ===
- Mike Rozier, Nebraska (AP-1; UPI-1)
- Ernest Anderson, Oklahoma State (AP-1; UPI-1)
- Marcus Dupree, Oklahoma (AP-1)
- Stanley Wilson, Oklahoma (AP-2)
- Fred Sims, Oklahoma (AP-2)
- Tommy Davis, Iowa State (AP-2)

=== Tight ends ===
- Jamie Williams, Nebraska (AP-1)
- Andy Gibler, Missouri (AP-2; UPI-1)

=== Wide receivers ===
- Mike Wallace, Kansas State (AP-1; UPI-1)
- James Caver, Missouri (UPI-1)
- Irving Fryar, Nebraska (AP-2)

=== Centers ===
- Dave Rimington, Nebraska (AP-1; UPI-1)
- Chuck Thomas, Oklahoma (AP-2)

=== Offensive guards ===
- Paul Parker, Oklahoma (AP-1)
- Mike Mandelko, Nebraska (AP-1)
- Steve Williams, Oklahoma (AP-2; UPI-1)
- Kevin Igo, Oklahoma State (AP-2)

=== Offensive tackles ===
- Randy Theiss, Nebraska (AP-1; UPI-1)
- Karl Nelson, Iowa State (AP-1; UPI-1)
- Russell Graham, Oklahoma State (AP-2)
- Conrad Goode, Missouri (AP-2)

== Defensive selections ==
=== Defensive ends ===
- Kevin Murphy, Oklahoma (AP-1; UPI-1)
- Reggie Singletary, Kansas State (AP-1; UPI-1)
- Tony Felici, Nebraska (AP-2; UPI-1)
- L. E. Madison, Kansas State (AP-2)

=== Defensive tackles ===
- Rick Bryan, Oklahoma (AP-1; UPI-1)
- Shamus McDonough, Iowa State (AP-1)
- Toby Williams, Nebraska (AP-2)
- Randy Jostes, Missouri (AP-2)

=== Nose guards ===
- Gary Lewis, Oklahoma State (AP-1; UPI-1)
- Jeff Merrell, Nebraska (AP-2)

=== Linebackers ===
- Jackie Shipp, Oklahoma (AP-1; UPI-1)
- Mike Green, Oklahoma State (AP-1; UPI-1)
- Steve Damkroger, Nebraska (AP-1)
- Dan Ruzich, Kansas State (AP-2)
- Jay Wilson, Missouri (AP-2)
- Chris Washington, Iowa State (AP-2)

=== Defensive backs ===
- Victor Scott, Colorado (AP-1; UPI-1)
- Ronnie Osborne, Iowa State (AP-1; UPI-1)
- Demetrious Johnson, Missouri (AP-1; UPI-1)
- Greg Best, Kansas State (AP-2; UPI-1)
- Keith Stanberry, Oklahoma (AP-2)
- Kevin Potter, Missouri (AP-2)

== Special teams ==
=== Place-kicker ===
- Larry Roach, Oklahoma State (AP-1; UPI-1)
- Alex Giffords, Iowa State (AP-2)

=== Punter ===
- Bucky Scribner, Kansas (AP-1; UPI-1)

== Key ==
AP = Associated Press

UPI = United Press International

== See also ==
- 1982 College Football All-America Team
