= Rick Bryan =

American football player (1962–2009)

No. 77
- Positions: Defensive end, defensive tackle

Personal information
- Born: March 20, 1962; Tulsa, Oklahoma, U.S.
- Died: July 25, 2009 (aged 47); Coweta, Oklahoma, U.S.
- Listed height: 6 ft 4 in (1.93 m)
- Listed weight: 265 lb (120 kg)

Career information
- High school: Coweta (OK)
- College: Oklahoma
- NFL draft: 1984: 1st round, 9th overall pick

Career history
- Atlanta Falcons (1984–1993)

Awards and highlights
- Unanimous All-American (1983); Consensus All-American (1982); 2× Big Eight Defensive Player of the Year (1982, 1983); 3× First-team All-Big Eight (1981, 1982, 1983)

Career NFL statistics
- Sacks: 29
- Fumble recoveries: 3
- Safeties: 1
- Stats at Pro Football Reference

Rick Don Bryan (March 20, 1962 – July 25, 2009) was an American professional football player who was a defensive end in the National Football League (NFL) for 10 seasons during the 1980s and 1990s. Bryan played college football for the Oklahoma Sooners, and received All-American honors. He ranked fifth on Sports Illustrated 2021 all-time “Top 10 Sooners Defensive Line” list. In another Sports Illustrated article titled “Greatest College Football Players by Jersey Number,” Bryan was mentioned as being the all-time greatest player of those who have ever wore college jersey number “80.” (WR Anthony Carter from University of Michigan was on the list for wearing jersey number “1.” DE Hugh Green from University of Pittsburgh was on the list for wearing jersey number “99.”) The Bleacher Report also stated in an article that Bryan was the best-ever college football player who wore jersey number “80.” Bryan was selected in the first round of the 1984 NFL draft, and played professionally for the Atlanta Falcons of the NFL.

Bryan’s younger brother Steve Bryan also played for the Sooners and also played in the NFL. An article in The Oklahoman stated that Steve was an “All-Big Eight defensive lineman who helped the Sooners win the 1985 national championship before playing two seasons for the Denver Broncos.” Rick and Steve’s older brother Mitch didn’t play in the NFL, but did also play college football for the Sooners.

== Early life ==
Bryan was born in Tulsa, Oklahoma. He attended Coweta High School in Coweta, Oklahoma where he earned All-State honors in 1980. He began playing linebacker in high school but was moved to defensive tackle by one of his coaches, Ben Wasson. Bryan was named to the Tulsa World's All-century High school football team in 1999.

== College career ==
Bryan was a consensus All-American at the University of Oklahoma in 1982 and 1983. He was Big Eight Defensive Player of the Year in 1982 and Academic All-Conference from 1981 to 1983. He owns the school record for career tackles by a defensive lineman (365), ranking him ahead of Kevin Murphy and Lee Roy Selmon. He is OU's eighth leading career tackler regardless of position. “No one outworked him,” said OU coach Barry Switzer.

== Professional career ==
Bryan was selected by the Atlanta Falcons with the ninth overall pick in the 1984 NFL draft. Bryan was the NFC Defensive Rookie of the Year in 1984. He spent all nine years of his professional career with the Atlanta Falcons, and still has the tenth most sacks in a career in Falcons' history, with the eighth most yardage lost. He eventually was forced into retirement by a number of injuries, including neck and back pains and a popped Achilles tendon. He was diagnosed with a spinal nerve injury in 1989, but kept playing and started sixteen games in each of the next two seasons.

== Death ==
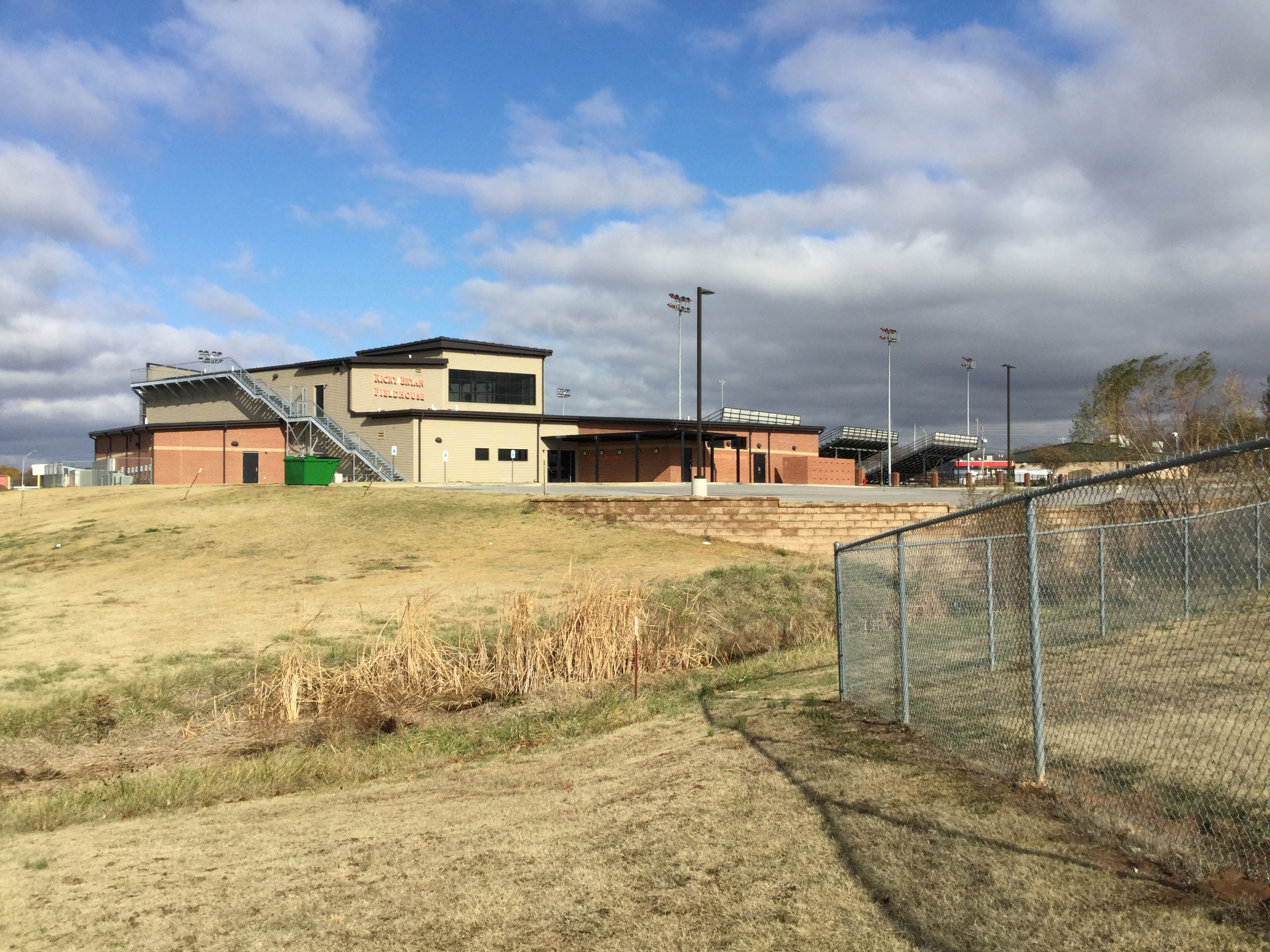
Ricky Bryan Field House in Coweta, Oklahoma

Bryan died on July 25, 2009, at the age of 47, in his home in Coweta. He had suffered from congestive heart failure and his family said he died of a heart attack. 2,500 people attended his funeral in Coweta on July 30, 2009. He now has a sign dedicated to him on the road outside the Coweta High School.

In 2018, contractors working for the Coweta school system completed construction of a new field house dedicated to Bryan. The honor was bestowed upon him not only because of his outstanding athletic abilities, but also for the time and effort he invested in the youth of the community. An article written by News on 6 stated that Bryan “always seemed to have time to work with kids; and putting his name on the new field house seems only natural.” On October 11, 2021, an EF-1 tornado severely damaged the Coweta Tigers’ baseball stadium, which is adjacent to the Ricky Bryan Field House. The field house was minimally affected by the tornado.
