= Irving Fryar =

American football player (born 1962)

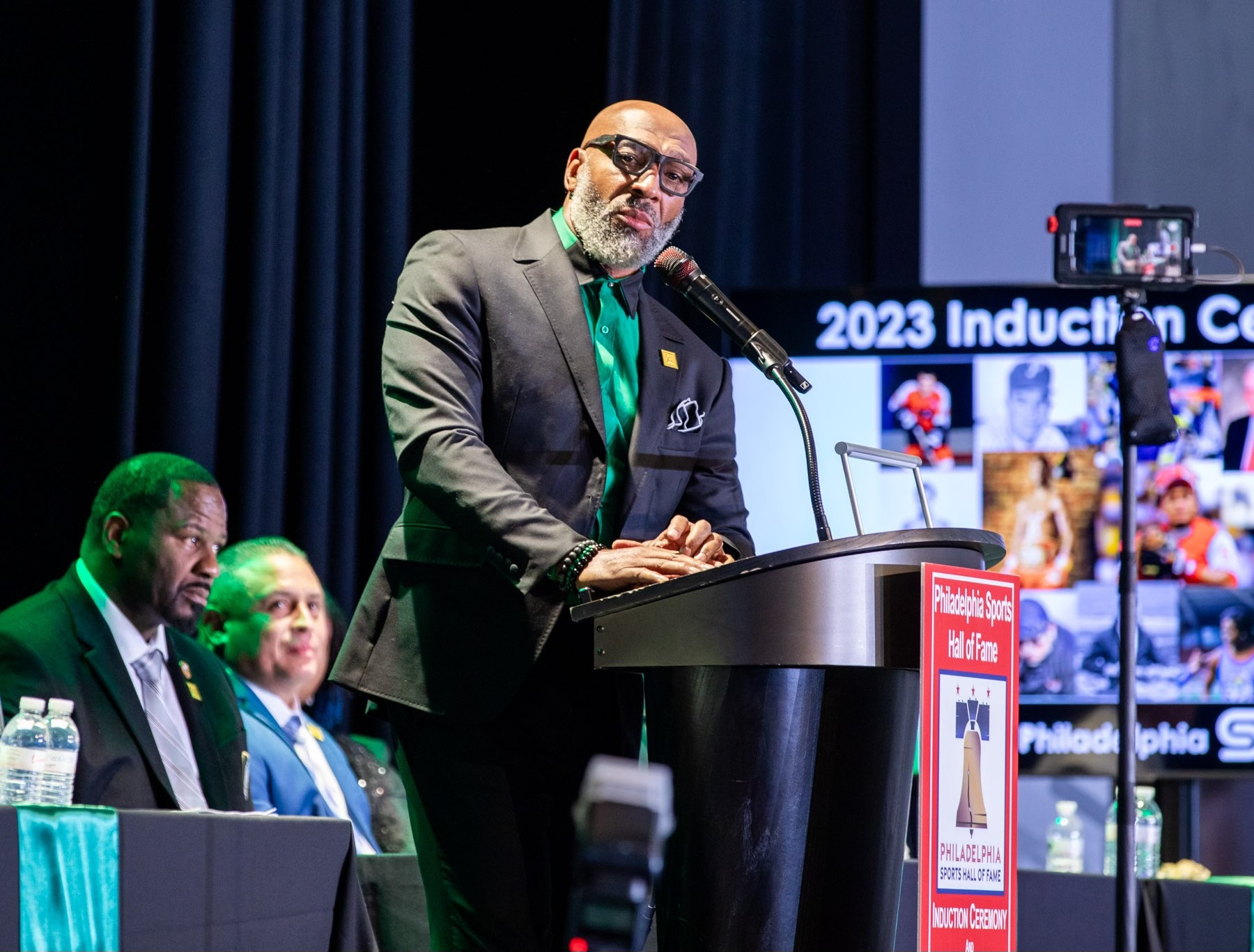
- Fryar in 2023

No. 80, 86
- Position: Wide receiver

Personal information
- Born: September 28, 1962 (age 64); Mount Holly Township, New Jersey, U.S.
- Listed height: 6 ft 0 in (1.83 m)
- Listed weight: 198 lb (90 kg)

Career information
- High school: Rancocas Valley Regional (Mount Holly)
- College: Nebraska (1981–1983)
- NFL draft: 1984: 1st round, 1st overall pick

Career history
- New England Patriots (1984–1992); Miami Dolphins (1993–1995); Philadelphia Eagles (1996–1998); Washington Redskins (1999–2000)

Awards and highlights
- 2× Second-team All-Pro (1985, 1994); 5× Pro Bowl (1985, 1993, 1994, 1996, 1997); New England Patriots All-1980s Team; New England Patriots 50th Anniversary Team (2009); Unanimous All-American (1983); First-team All-Big Eight (1983); Second-team All-Big Eight (1982); Philadelphia Sports Hall of Fame (2023); Japan Bowl MVP (1984)

Career NFL statistics
- Receptions: 851
- Receiving yards: 12,785
- Receiving touchdowns: 84
- Stats at Pro Football Reference

Irving Dale Fryar Sr. (born September 28, 1962) is an American former professional football wide receiver who played in the National Football League (NFL) for 17 seasons. He played college football for the Nebraska Cornhuskers, earning Unanimous All-American honors in 1983. Fryar was selected first overall by the New England Patriots in the 1984 NFL draft.

During his first nine seasons with the Patriots, Fryar received Pro Bowl and second-team All-Pro honors in 1985 as a member of the team that made the franchise's Super Bowl debut in Super Bowl XX. Fryar spent his next three seasons with Miami Dolphins, extending his Pro Bowl selections to three and his second-team All-Pro selections to two. He played another three seasons for the Philadelphia Eagles, where he was selected to his fourth and fifth Pro Bowl. In his two final seasons, Fryar was a member of the Washington Redskins. For his accomplishments with the Eagles, he was inducted to the Philadelphia Sports Hall of Fame in 2023.

== Early life ==
Fryar grew up in Mount Holly Township, New Jersey, and played high school football at Rancocas Valley Regional High School.

== College career ==
A unanimous All-American at the University of Nebraska–Lincoln in 1983, Fryar played alongside Heisman Trophy winner Mike Rozier (running back) and Heisman finalist Turner Gill (quarterback).

=== Statistics ===
Season	Receiving				Rushing			
Season	Rec	Yds	Avg	TD	Att	Yds	Avg	TD
1981	3	70	23.1	1	7	30	4.3	1
1982	24	346	17.3	2	20	253	12.7	2
1983	40	780	19.5	8	23	318	13.8	2
Totals	67	1,196	17.9	11	52	615	11.8	5

== Professional career ==
Fryar was the second wide receiver to be selected first overall in an NFL draft when the New England Patriots made him the top selection of the 1984 NFL draft.

With the Patriots, Fryar saw success on a receiving corps that featured Stephen Starring and perennial Pro Bowler Stanley Morgan. He also served as the team's primary punt returner. Following the 1985 season, in which Fryar was named to his first Pro Bowl, he played in Super Bowl XX, where he scored New England's only touchdown in their 46–10 loss to the Chicago Bears. He was one of the few marquee players on the 1–15 1990 team, and in 1991 he had his first 1000-yard receiving season. Traded to the Dolphins in 1993 for a pair of high-round draft picks, he made an immediate impact, having two further 1000-yard seasons in 1993 and 1994, and making the Pro Bowl both years. Following the 1995 season, he signed as a free agent with the Eagles, with whom he played in his fourth and fifth Pro Bowls following the 1996 and 1997 seasons, respectively. He also received the Bart Starr Award following the 1997 season. After briefly retiring from football following the 1998 season, he signed with the Redskins, with whom he played the final two seasons of his career.

Fryar retired from the NFL in 2001 after completing 17 NFL seasons. During that time, he caught 851 passes for 12,785 yards and 84 touchdowns, along with one rushing and three punt return touchdowns. He also gained 242 rushing yards, 2,055 yards returning punts, 505 yards on kickoff returns, and 7 fumble return yards, giving him 15,594 all-purpose yards.

Fryar's 255 played games are the most ever for a New Jersey-born player.

== NFL career statistics ==
Legend
**Bold**	Career high

=== Regular season ===
Year	Team	Games		Receiving				
Year	Team	GP	GS	Rec	Yds	Avg	Lng	TD
1984	NWE	14	3	11	164	14.9	26	1
1985	NWE	**16**	14	39	670	17.2	56	7
1986	NWE	14	13	43	737	17.1	69	6
1987	NWE	12	12	31	467	15.1	40	5
1988	NWE	15	14	33	490	14.8	**80**	5
1989	NWE	11	5	29	537	**18.5**	52	3
1990	NWE	**16**	15	54	856	15.9	56	4
1991	NWE	**16**	15	68	1,014	14.9	56	3
1992	NWE	15	14	55	791	14.4	54	4
1993	MIA	**16**	**16**	64	1,010	15.8	65	5
1994	MIA	**16**	**16**	73	1,270	17.4	54	7
1995	MIA	**16**	**16**	62	910	14.7	67	8
1996	PHI	**16**	**16**	**88**	1,195	13.6	42	**11**
1997	PHI	**16**	**16**	86	**1,316**	15.3	72	6
1998	PHI	**16**	**16**	48	556	11.6	61	2
1999	WAS	**16**	1	26	254	9.8	30	2
2000	WAS	14	6	41	548	13.4	34	5
		255	208	851	12,785	15.0	80	84

=== Playoffs ===
Year	Team	Games		Receiving				
Year	Team	GP	GS	Rec	Yds	Avg	Lng	TD
1985	NWE	**3**	**2**	4	71	**17.8**	**39**	**1**
1986	NWE	1	1	2	11	5.5	7	0
1994	MIA	2	**2**	**11**	**141**	12.8	24	**1**
1995	MIA	1	1	3	29	9.7	15	0
1996	PHI	1	1	5	62	12.4	20	0
1999	WAS	2	0	5	47	9.4	17	0
		10	7	30	361	12.0	39	2

== Personal life ==
Fryar has had several off field incidents during and after his career. In 1985, he missed the AFC championship game after injuring his hand in a domestic dispute with his pregnant wife. He was arrested in 1988 on weapons charges after a New Jersey state trooper found a loaded shotgun and handgun and a hunting knife in Fryar's car.

On November 23, 1986, Fryar separated his shoulder during a game against the Buffalo Bills. Instead of watching the rest of the game from the sidelines, Fryar left the stadium and was listening to the game while driving his car through Foxboro. He crashed into a tree and suffered a slight concussion.

His wife filed for divorce in 2014 after 29 years of marriage. They have four children.

On August 7, 2015, Fryar and his mother, Allene McGhee, were found guilty of conspiring to defraud six banks and a mortgage company by a New Jersey Superior Court jury. The prosecution maintained that Fryar and McGhee conspired with real estate consultant William Barksdale in a scheme to fraudulently obtain six home-equity loans totaling about $850,000 in November and December 2009, and a $414,000 mortgage in October 2009, using McGhee's home as collateral in each instance. Fryar and McGhee maintain they were victims of Barksdale, who is serving a 20-month sentence in federal prison for conspiracy to commit wire fraud for his role in the scheme, and plans to appeal.

Fryar's son, Londen, was signed by the New York Giants as an undrafted free agent in 2009 out of Western Michigan University.

On October 2, 2015, Pro Football Talk reported that Fryar and his mother were convicted of mortgage fraud. Fryar will receive a five-year prison sentence while his mother will receive probation. According to the New Jersey AG who oversaw the case, John Hoffman, "The fact that Fryar had the means to succeed and do good things and instead chose this criminal path makes his actions all the more reprehensible".

On December 7, 2015, a NJ Judge handed up an order that Irving Fryar and his mother to pay $615,600 in restitution to five lending institutions that were cheated in a mortgage scam. Fryar and his mother, Allene McGhee, were convicted of applying for multiple mortgage loans in quick succession while using the same property as collateral. Fryar was sentenced in October to five years in prison while his mother received three years of probation. In June 2016, Fryar was released from prison after serving eight months of his sentence. He was placed under the state's Supervision Program for non-violent offenders.

== NFL records ==
- Touchdown receptions from 19 different passers
- First player to record a touchdown in 17 consecutive seasons (1984–2000) - (broken by Jerry Rice who ended up with 20 consecutive seasons with a touchdown reception)
- Oldest player to score 4 touchdowns (all receptions) in a single game (October 20, 1996) - 34 years, 22 days
- Third most receiving yards in a half - 211 (2nd half, September 4, 1994)
