= 1983 All-America college football team =

Official list of the best college football players of 1983

The 1983 All-America college football team is composed of college football players who were selected as All-Americans by various organizations and writers that chose College Football All-America Teams in 1983. The National Collegiate Athletic Association (NCAA) recognizes five selectors as "official" for the 1983 season. They are: (1) the American Football Coaches Association (AFCA); (2) the Associated Press (AP) selected based on the votes of sports writers at AP newspapers; (3) the Football Writers Association of America (FWAA) selected by the nation's football writers; (4) the United Press International (UPI); and (5) the Walter Camp Football Foundation (WC). Other selectors included Football News (FN), Gannett News Service, the Newspaper Enterprise Association (NEA), and The Sporting News (TSN).

== Consensus All-Americans ==
The following charts identify the NCAA-recognized consensus All-Americans for the year 1983 and displays which first-team designations they received.

=== Offense ===
Name	Position	School	Number	Official	Other
Bill Fralic	Tackle	Pittsburgh	5/4/9	AFCA, AP, FWAA, UPI, WC	FN, GNS, NEA, TSN
Irving Fryar	Receiver	Nebraska	5/4/9	AFCA, AP, FWAA, UPI, WC	FN, GNS, NEA, TSN
Mike Rozier	Running back	Nebraska	5/4/9	AFCA, AP, FWAA, UPI, WC	FN, GNS, NEA, TSN
Steve Young	Quarterback	Brigham Young	5/4/9	AFCA, AP, FWAA, UPI, WC	FN, GNS, NEA, TSN
Gordon Hudson	Tight end	Brigham Young	5/3/8	AFCA, AP, FWAA, UPI, WC	FN, GNS, NEA
Dean Steinkuhler	Guard	Nebraska	4/4/8	AFCA, FWAA, UPI, WC	FN, GNS, NEA, TSN
Bo Jackson	Running back	Auburn	4/3/7	AFCA, AP, FWAA, UPI	FN, GNS, NEA
Terry Long	Tackle	East Carolina	4/0/4	AFCA, AP, FWAA, WC	-
Tony Slaton	Center	USC	3/1/4	FWAA, UPI, WC	FN
Doug Dawson	Guard	Texas	3/0/3	AFCA, AP, WC	-
Napoleon McCallum	Running back	Navy	2/1/3	FWAA, WC	TSN
Greg Allen	Running back	Florida State	2/0/2	UPI, WC	-

=== Defense ===
Name	Position	School	Number	Official	Other
Rick Bryan	Def. tackle	Oklahoma	5/4/9	AFCA, AP, FWAA, UPI, WC	FN, GNS, NEA, TSN
Russell Carter	Def. back	SMU	5/4/9	AFCA, AP, FWAA, UPI, WC	FN, GNS, NEA, TSN
Reggie White	Def. tackle	Tennessee	5/4/9	AFCA, AP, FWAA, UPI, WC	FN, GNS, NEA, TSN
Ricky Hunley	Linebacker	Arizona	5/2/7	AFCA, AP, FWAA, UPI, WC	FN, NEA
Terry Hoage	Def. back	Georgia	4/3/7	AFCA, FWAA, UPI, WC	FN, NEA, TSN
Jerry Gray	Def. back	Texas	4/2/6	AFCA, AP, FWAA, UPI	GNS, NEA
Wilber Marshall	Linebacker	Florida	4/2/6	AFCA, AP, UPI, WC	FN, NEA
Ron Rivera	Linebacker	California	3/4/7	AFCA, AP, FWAA	FN, GNS, NEA, TSN
Don Rogers	Def. back	UCLA	3/3/6	AFCA, FWAA, WC	FN, GNS, TSN
William Perry	Middle guard	Clemson	4/0/4	AP, FWAA, UPI, WC	-
Jeff Leiding	Linebacker	Texas	3/1/4	AP, FWAA, WC	FN
William Fuller	Defensive end	North Carolina	2/2/4	AFCA, WC	FN, TSN

=== Special teams ===
Name	Position	School	Number	Official	Other
Luis Zendejas	Placekicker	Arizona St.	3/1/4	AP, FWAA, WC	NEA
Jack Weil	Punter	Wyoming	3/0/3	AP, FWAA, UPI	-

== Offense ==
=== Receivers ===
- Irving Fryar, Nebraska (AFCA, AP-1, FWAA, UPI-1, WC, FN-1, GNS-1, NEA-1, TSN)
- Gerald McNeil, Baylor (AFCA, AP-1, FN-2, GNS-3)
- Kenny Jackson, Penn State (AP-2, NEA-1)
- Eric Martin, LSU (GNS-2, TSN)
- Jerry Rice, Mississippi Valley State (CFHOF) (GNS-1)
- Brian Brennan, Boston College (AP-2, UPI-2, FN-2)
- Louis Lipps, Southern Mississippi (GNS-2)
- Eric Richardson, San Jose State (NEA-2)
- Dwight Collins, Pittsburgh (NEA-2)
- Tracy Henderson, Iowa State (AP-3)
- Dave Moritz, Iowa (AP-3)
- Jim Sandusky, San Diego State (FN-3, GNS-3)

=== Tight ends ===
- Gordon Hudson, Brigham Young (CFHOF) (AFCA, AP-1, FWAA, UPI-1, WC, FN-1, GNS-1, NEA-1)
- Chuck Scott, Vanderbilt (TSN)
- John Frank, Ohio State (FN-3, GNS-2, NEA-2)
- Glenn Dennison, Miami (FL) (AP-2)
- Paul Bergmann, UCLA (AP-3, UPI-2)
- Keli McGregor, Colorado State (GNS-3)

=== Tackles ===
- Bill Fralic, Pittsburgh (CFHOF) (AFCA, AP-1, FWAA, UPI-1, WC, FN-1, GNS-1, NEA-1, TSN)
- Terry Long, East Carolina (AFCA, AP-1[guard], FWAA, UPI-2 [guard], WC, FN-3 [guard], GNS-3 [guard])
- Brian Blados, North Carolina (AP-1, UPI-2, FN-3, GNS-3, NEA-1)
- Mark Adickes, Baylor (AP-2, GNS-1, TSN)
- Conrad Goode, Missouri (UPI-1, FN-1)
- Jim Juriga, Illinois (UPI-2, NEA-2)
- Guy McIntyre, Georgia (AP-2)
- William Roberts, Ohio State (FN-2, GNS-2)
- Larry Williams, Notre Dame (FN-2)
- Don Maggs, Tulane (GNS-2)
- Pat Arrington, Auburn (AP-3)
- Scott Raridon, Nebraska (AP-3)
- Duval Love, UCLA (FN-3)
- Mark MacDonald, Boston College (GNS-3)

=== Guards ===
- Dean Steinkuhler, Nebraska (AFCA, AP-2, FWAA, UPI-1, WC, FN-1, GNS-1, NEA-1, TSN)
- Doug Dawson, Texas (AFCA, AP-1, UPI-2, WC, FN-2, GNS-2, NEA-2 [tackle])
- Stefan Humphries, Michigan (AP-2, FWAA, UPI-1, FN-1, GNS-2, NEA-2, TSN)
- Gary Zimmerman, Oregon (AP-3, GNS-3, NEA-1)
- Ron Solt, Maryland (FN-2, GNS-1, NEA-2)
- James Farr, Clemson (AP-3)
- Chris Babyar, Illinois (FN-3)

=== Centers ===
- Tony Slaton, USC (AP-2, FWAA, UPI-1, WC, FN-1)
- Tom Dixon, Michigan (AFCA, AP-1, FN-2, GNS-1, TSN)
- Mike Ruether, Texas (UPI-2 [guard], NEA-1)
- Jim Sweeney, Pittsburgh (AP-3, GNS-2)
- Joel Hilgenberg, Iowa (GNS-3, NEA-2)
- Phil Ebinger, Duke (FN-3)

=== Quarterbacks ===
- Steve Young, Brigham Young (CFHOF) (AFCA, AP-1, FWAA, UPI-1, WC, FN-1, GNS-1, NEA-1, TSN)
- Randall Cunningham, UNLV (CFHOF) (AFCA [punter], AP-2 [punter], GNS-2)
- Doug Flutie, Boston College (CFHOF) (UPI-2, FN-3)
- Turner Gill, Nebraska (AP-2)
- Walter Lewis, Alabama (FN-2)
- Boomer Esiason, Maryland (NEA-2)
- Ben Bennett, Duke (AP-3)
- Jeff Hostetler, West Virginia (GNS-3)

=== Running backs ===
- Mike Rozier, Nebraska (CFHOF) (AFCA, AP-1, FWAA, UPI-1, WC, FN-1, GNS-1, NEA-1, TSN)
- Bo Jackson, Auburn (CFHOF) (AFCA, AP-1, FWAA, UPI-1, FN-1, GNS-1, NEA-1)
- Greg Allen, Florida State (AP-3, UPI-1, WC, FN-2, GNS-3, NEA-2)
- Napoleon McCallum, Navy (CFHOF) (AP-2, FWAA, UPI-2, WC, FN-2, GNS-3, NEA-2, TSN [RS])
- Allen Pinkett, Notre Dame (AP-2, UPI-2, FN-1, GNS-2, TSN)
- Keith Byars, Ohio State (CFHOF) (AP-3, UPI-2, GNS-2)
- Alfred Anderson, Baylor (FN-2)
- Ethan Horton, North Carolina (FN-3)
- D. J. Dozier, Penn State (FN-3)
- John Kershner, Air Force (FN-3)

== Defense ==
=== Defensive ends ===
- William Fuller, North Carolina (CFHOF) (AFCA, AP-2, UPI-2 [DT], WC, FN-1, GNS-2, NEA-2, TSN)
- Bruce Smith, Virginia Tech (CFHOF) (AFCA, AP-2, FN-3, GNS-1, NEA-1)
- Don Thorp, Illinois (AP-3 [DT], FWAA, UPI-2 [DT], FN-2, GNS-3, NEA-2, TSN)
- Freddie Gilbert, Georgia (AP-2, UPI-1, FN-2, GNS-2)
- Ron Faurot, Arkansas (UPI-1, FN-2)
- Donnie Humphrey, Auburn (UPI-2, GNS-3)
- Jimmie Carter, New Mexico (AP-3)

=== Defensive tackles ===
- Rick Bryan, Oklahoma (AFCA, AP-1, FWAA, UPI-1, WC, FN-1, GNS-1, NEA-1, TSN)
- Reggie White, Tennessee (CFHOF) (AFCA, AP-1, FWAA, UPI-1, WC, FN-1, GNS-1, NEA-1, TSN)
- Keith Millard, Washington State (GNS-1)
- Dan Ralph, Oregon (GNS-2)
- Ray Childress, Texas A&M (CFHOF) (GNS-2)
- Doug Smith, Auburn (AP-3, FN-2, NEA-2)
- Andre Townsend, Mississippi (FN-3)
- Alphonso Carreker, Florida State (FN-3)
- Bill Maas, Pittsburgh (GNS-3)
- James Robinson, Clemson (GNS-3)

=== Middle guards ===
- William Perry, Clemson (AP-1, FWAA, UPI-1, WC, FN-2)
- Brian Pillman, Miami (OH) (AP-2)
- Michael Carter, SMU (AP-3, UPI-2)

=== Linebackers ===
- Ricky Hunley, Arizona (CFHOF) (AFCA, AP-1, FWAA, UPI-1, WC, FN-1, GNS-2, NEA-1)
- Wilber Marshall, Florida (CFHOF) (AFCA, AP-1, UPI-1, WC, FN-1 [DL], GNS-3, NEA-1)
- Ron Rivera, California (AFCA, AP-1, FWAA, UPI-2, FN-1 [DL], GNS-1, NEA-1, TSN)
- Jeff Leiding, Texas (AP-1, FWAA, UPI-2, WC, FN-1)
- Carl Banks, Michigan State (AP-1, UPI-1, GNS-1, NEA-1, TSN)
- Vaughan Johnson, North Carolina State (AP-2, TSN)
- Jay Brophy, Miami (FL) (AP-3, UPI-2, FN-1, NEA-2)
- Jack Del Rio, USC (AP-3, FN-3 [DL], GNS-1, NEA-2)
- Kevin Murphy, Oklahoma (AP-2, UPI-2 [DE], GNS-2)
- Gregg Carr, Auburn (AP-2, FN-3)
- Steve DeOssie, Boston College (AP-2)
- Jackie Shipp, Oklahoma (FN-2, NEA-2)
- Rowland Tatum, Ohio State (FN-3 [DL], NEA-2)
- Larry Station, Iowa (FN-2)
- Scott Radecic, Penn State (FN-2)
- Mike Knox, Nebraska (GNS-2)
- Jim Dumont, Rutgers (AP-3)
- Andy Ponseigo, Navy (AP-3, FN-3)
- Tommy Thurson, Georgia (FN-3)
- Gary Reasons, NW Louisiana St (Div I-AA) (GNS-3)
- Emanuel King, Alabama (GNS-3)

=== Defensive backs ===
- Don Rogers, UCLA (AFCA, AP-2, FWAA, UPI-2, WC, FN-1, GNS-1, NEA-2, TSN)
- Jerry Gray, Texas (CFHOF) (AFCA, AP-1, FWAA, UPI-1, GNS-1, NEA-1)
- Russell Carter, SMU (AFCA, AP-1, FWAA, UPI-1, WC, FN-1, GNS-1, NEA-1, TSN)
- Terry Hoage, Georgia (CFHOF) (AFCA, FWAA, UPI-1, WC, FN-1, GNS-2, NEA-1, TSN)
- Mossy Cade, Texas (AP-1, UPI-2, WC, FN-2, GNS-2, NEA-2, TSN)
- Leonard Coleman, Vanderbilt (AP-3, GNS-1, NEA-2)
- Craig Swoope, Illinois (AP-2, UPI-2, FN-3, NEA-1)
- Victor Scott, Colorado (AP-2)
- Tom Flynn, Pittsburgh (FN-3, NEA-2)
- Ken Calhoun, Miami (FL) (FN-2)
- Tony Lilly, Florida (FN-2)
- David Fulcher, Arizona State (CFHOF) (GNS-2)
- Randy Robbins, Arizona (GNS-2)
- Martin Bayless, Bowling Green (AP-3, GNS-3)
- Harry Hamilton, Penn State (AP-3, GNS-3)
- Tim Agee, West Virginia (FN-3)
- Chris Rockins, Oklahoma State (GNS-3)
- Bo Eason, UC Davis (GNS-3)

== Special teams ==
=== Kickers ===
- Luis Zendejas, Arizona State (AP-1, FWAA, WC, FN-3, GNS-2, NEA-1)
- Bruce Kallmeyer, Kansas (AFCA, AP-2, UPI-1, GNS-1)
- Paul Woodside, West Virginia (UPI-2, FN-2, TSN)
- Tony Zendejas, Nevada (Reno) (NEA-2)
- Jeff Ward, Texas (AP-3)
- Kevin Butler, Georgia (FN-1, GNS-3)

=== Punters ===
- Jack Weil, Wyoming (AP-1, FWAA, UPI-1, FN-3, GNS-3, NEA-2)
- Jim Colquitt, Tennessee (WC, FN-2, NEA-1)
- Randall Cunningham, UNLV (CFHOF) (AFCA, AP-2)
- Ralf Mojsiejenko, Michigan State (GNS-1, TSN)
- John Kidd, Northwestern (FN-1, GNS-2)
- John Teltschik, Texas (UPI-2)
- Harry Newsome, Wake Forest (AP-3)

=== Returners ===
- Napoleon McCallum, Navy (CFHOF) (TSN)

== Key ==
- **Bold** – Consensus All-American
- -1 – First-team selection
- -2 – Second-team selection
- -3 – Third-team selection
- CFHOF = College Football Hall of Fame inductee

=== Official selectors ===
- AFCA – American Football Coaches Association, aka the Kodak-AFCA Team
- AP – Associated Press
- FWAA – Football Writers Association of America
- UPI – United Press International
- WC – Walter Camp Football Foundation

=== Other selectors ===
- FN – Football News
- GNS – Gannett News Service
- NEA – Newspaper Enterprise Association
- TSN – The Sporting News

== See also ==
- 1983 All-Atlantic Coast Conference football team
- 1983 All-Big Eight Conference football team
- 1983 All-Big Ten Conference football team
- 1983 All-Pacific-10 Conference football team
- 1983 All-SEC football team
