= Dean Steinkuhler =

American football player (born 1961)

No. 70
- Position: Guard

Personal information
- Born: January 27, 1961 (age 65); Burr, Nebraska, U.S.
- Listed height: 6 ft 3 in (1.91 m)
- Listed weight: 275 lb (125 kg)

Career information
- High school: Sterling (NE)
- College: Nebraska
- NFL draft: 1984: 1st round, 2nd overall pick

Career history
- Houston Oilers (1984–1991)

Awards and highlights
- PFWA All-Rookie Team (1984); Outland Trophy (1983); Lombardi Award (1983); UPI Lineman of the Year (1983); Consensus All-American (1983); First-team All-Big Eight (1983); Nebraska Cornhuskers Jersey No. 71 retired

Career NFL statistics
- Games played: 100
- Games started: 77
- Fumble recoveries: 4
- Stats at Pro Football Reference

Dean Elmer Steinkuhler (born January 27, 1961) is an American former professional football player who was a guard in the National Football League (NFL) for eight seasons in the 1980s and 1990s. He played college football for the Nebraska Cornhuskers and was recognized as an All-American. Steinkuhler was selected by the Houston Oilers in the first round of the 1984 NFL draft.

== College career ==
Steinkuhler attended the University of Nebraska–Lincoln, where he won the Outland Trophy as the nation's top offensive lineman in 1983. It was the third consecutive year an NU lineman won the award, as Dave Rimington won back-to-back Outland Trophies in 1981 and 1982. Steinkuhler also won the Lombardi Award in 1983, marking the second consecutive year a Nebraska player had won that award as Rimington had also won the Lombardi in 1982. Nebraska is the only team that has had consecutive winners of both of these awards. Steinkuhler is one of eight Nebraska winners of the Outland Trophy and one of five Nebraska winners of the Lombardi Award. Nebraska players have won nine Outland Trophys overall, by far the most in the nation. Oklahoma has the second most with four. Steinkuhler, along with fellow Nebraska Cornhuskers Rich Glover, Dave Rimington and Ndamukong Suh, is one of only 13 players to have won both the Outland Trophy and the Lombardi Award.

In 1999 Steinkuhler was selected to the Nebraska All-Century Football Team via fan poll and was named to the All-Century Nebraska football team by Gannett News Service. He is one of only 16 Cornhuskers to have his jersey (#71) retired by the team. Steinkuhler is also remembered for being the player who picked up quarterback Turner Gill's intentional fumble in the 1984 Orange Bowl and ran it 19 yards for a touchdown in a play dubbed the "Fumblerooski".

== Collegiate All-Century Teams ==
In 1999, Steinkuhler was selected as a third-team offensive guard by Sports Illustrated in their "NCAA Football All-Century Team". The starters were Jim Parker of Ohio State and John Hannah of Alabama, the second-team consisted of Bob Suffridge of Tennessee and Bill Fischer of Notre Dame and the other third-team player was Aaron Taylor of Nebraska. Steinkuhler was one of six Nebraska Cornhuskers on this All-Century Team 85-man roster; the others being Glover, Johnny Rodgers, Rimington, Tommie Frazier and Taylor.

In 1999, Steinkuhler was selected as an offensive guard to the Walter Camp Football Foundation College Football All Century Team. The other offensive guards selected were the aforementioned Hannah, Parker, and Taylor, as well as Brad Budde of USC and Will Shields of Nebraska. Steinkuhler was one of six Nebraska Cornhuskers selected to this team; the others being Rodgers, Rimington, Shields, Frazier and Taylor.

Steinkuhler is one of 54 players and one of five Cornhuskers named to both the Sports Illustrated and Walter Camp All-Century teams.

== Professional career ==
Steinkuhler was the second overall pick in the first round of the 1984 NFL draft, taken by the Houston Oilers. He was an Oilers co-rookie of the year. Steinkuhler played both offensive guard and offensive tackle with the Oilers after playing solely offensive guard in college. He played eight seasons with the Oilers (some of those alongside fellow former Husker teammate Mike Rozier) before retiring in 1991.

== Personal ==
Steinkuhler hailed from Burr, Nebraska, which, according to the 2000 census, has a population of just 66 people. It is thought to be the smallest town to ever produce an All-American. He played both eight-man and eleven-man football at nearby Sterling High School. Steinkuhler's sons, Ty and Baker, have followed in his footsteps. Both are defensive tackles, and both graduated from Nebraska. They played at Lincoln Southwest High School and Syracuse-Dunbar-Avoca High School.
