= Gary Lewis (defensive lineman) =

American gridiron football player (born 1961)

No. 93, 61, 79
- Position: Defensive tackle

Personal information
- Born: January 14, 1961 (age 65); Oklahoma City, Oklahoma, U.S.
- Listed height: 6 ft 3 in (1.91 m)
- Listed weight: 260 lb (118 kg)

Career information
- High school: Millwood (Oklahoma City)
- College: Oklahoma State
- NFL draft: 1983: 4th round, 98th overall pick

Career history
- 1983–1984: New Orleans Saints
- 1985: Ottawa Rough Riders
- 1985–1994: Saskatchewan Roughriders

Awards and highlights
- Grey Cup champion (1989); 2× CFL West All-Star (1988, 1991); Saskatchewan Roughriders Panel of Honor; First-team All-American (1982); 2× First-team All-Big Eight (1981, 1982)
- Stats at Pro Football Reference

Gary Lewis (born January 14, 1961) is an American former professional football player who was a defensive tackle in the Canadian Football League (CFL) for ten seasons. Previously, he played one season in the National Football League (NFL) for the New Orleans Saints. He won the Grey Cup in 1989 with the Saskatchewan Roughriders.

== Early life ==
Born and raised in Oklahoma City, Oklahoma, Lewis played scholastically at Millwood High School, where he was a four-year letterman playing both sides of the line. He also started on state championship basketball teams as a junior and senior.

== College career ==
Lewis played collegiately for the Oklahoma State Cowboys, leading the team in sacks and tackles-for-loss as both a junior and senior. He was selected to the All-Big Eight first-team both years. As a senior, he was honored by the Associated Press as a first-team All-American, as well as being named to the Blue-Gray and Senior Bowl squads.

== NFL career ==
Lewis was selected by the New Orleans Saints in the fourth-round of the 1983 NFL draft. He was placed on injured reserve in the preseason, and missed the first ten weeks. He was on the active roster for the last six games of the season. He spent the entire 1984 season on injured reserve with the Saints, after a routine x-ray uncovered a lump in his chest, which turned out to be malignant. He was released by the Saints on August 20, 1985, midway through the preseason.

== CFL career ==
Two weeks later he was signed by the Ottawa Rough Riders to a 21-day trial, midway through the CFL season. He was activated shortly thereafter, appeared in two games for Ottawa, and was then transferred to the Saskatchewan Roughriders. He appeared in four games for Saskatchewan, recording three sacks in his debut.

Lewis spent nine more years with the Roughriders, and was a member of the 1989 team which won the Grey Cup. For his CFL career he appeared in 150 games, recording 68 sacks and 10 fumble recoveries (one for a touchdown). He was voted to the Western Division All-Star team twice, in 1988 and 1991.

Lewis was inducted into the RoughRiders' Plaza of Honor in 2006.

== Life after football ==
After retiring from the CFL, Lewis returned to his hometown of Oklahoma City, pursuing a career as a federal prison guard and officiating high school football.
