= Victor Scott =

American football player (born 1962)

No. 22
- Position: Defensive back

Personal information
- Born: June 1, 1962 (age 64); East St. Louis, Illinois, U.S.
- Listed height: 6 ft 0 in (1.83 m)
- Listed weight: 200 lb (91 kg)

Career information
- High school: East St. Louis (IL) Senior
- College: Colorado
- NFL draft: 1984: 2nd round, 40th overall pick

Career history
- Dallas Cowboys (1984–1988); Orlando Predators (1991); San Antonio Force (1992); Massachusetts Marauders (1994)

Awards and highlights
- Second-team All-American (1983); 2× First-team All-Big Eight (1982, 1983); Second-team All-Big Eight (1981)

Career NFL statistics
- Interceptions: 5
- Sacks: 3
- Fumble recoveries: 3
- Stats at Pro Football Reference

Career AFL statistics
- Receptions: 6
- Receiving yards: 76
- Touchdowns: 1
- Tackles: 29
- Interceptions: 1
- Stats at ArenaFan.com

Victor Ramone Scott (born June 1, 1962) is an American former professional football player who was a defensive back in the National Football League (NFL) for the Dallas Cowboys. He played college football for the Colorado Buffaloes.

== Early life ==
Scott attended East St. Louis Senior High School, where he practiced football, basketball and baseball. In football, he helped his school win a state championship, where he caught 6 passes for 116 yards.

He was an All-state, league, city and metro selection. He was named to the Chicago Tribune Super 22 All-star team and was invited to play in the state high school All-star contest.

== College career ==
Scott accepted a football scholarship from the University of Colorado during a low point in the school history, where his teams never had a winning record and he was usually recognized as the most talented player of the defense. He was a four-year starter (43 out 44 games) at cornerback, that also excelled on special teams.

As a junior, he led the team in interceptions with 4, including 2 returned for touchdowns. Against Oklahoma State University, he intercepted 3 passes, returning 2 for touchdowns of 30 and 25 yards.

As senior, he had 4 interceptions, returning one for a 71-yard touchdown against Kansas State University.

He was named All-Big Eight in 1982 and 1983. He received second-team All-American honors in 1983, and played in the Hula Bowl and the Senior Bowl.

Scott set school career records with 3 interceptions returned for touchdowns and 24 passes defensed. He also had 10 interceptions, 4 blocked field goals and 4 blocked extra points. He received an honorable-mention for the Big Eight All-Decade team of the eighties.

== Professional career ==
=== Dallas Cowboys ===
Scott was selected by the Dallas Cowboys in the second round (40th overall) of the 1984 NFL draft. As a rookie, he won the nickelback role and played on special teams. His diving, fourth-quarter interception in the eleventh game against the St. Louis Cardinals, set up the game's winning touchdown.

The next season, he had a chance to start 3 games at right cornerback in place of an injured Ron Fellows. In the fifteenth game of the season against the New York Giants, he helped the Cowboys clinch the NFC East Championship when he intercepted a Phil Simms pass with 46 seconds remaining in the fourth quarter. He also had 3 sacks, 2 interceptions (one returned for a touchdown), 7 passes defensed and one forced fumble.

In 1986, he was voted the special teams captain, but had an injury plagued season, playing in only 5 games after having early problems with a preseason hamstring injury and breaking his wrist in the fifth game against the Denver Broncos. He returned to play in the last game of the season.

In 1987, he strained a chest muscle that limited him in the preseason. He played in only 6 games, after refusing to take a drug test and being placed on the reserve-non football illness list for personal reasons on October 29. In the final 3 games he made 9 tackles, defended 3 passes and recovered a fumble.

In 1988, he only played in 2 games, after suffering an ankle injury and being placed on the injured reserve list. He also was suspended by the league for testing positive for Cocaine.

In 1990, after being out of football for one year, the Cowboys gave him a chance to make the team, but he was released before the season started.

=== Orlando Predators (AFL) ===
Scott signed with the Orlando Predators of the Arena Football League for the 1991 season, where he played as a Wide receiver/linebacker.

=== San Antonio Force (AFL) ===
In 1992, he played for the San Antonio Force as a Wide receiver/linebacker.

=== Massachusetts Marauders (AFL) ===
Scott signed with the Massachusetts Marauders for the 1994 season, playing as a Wide receiver/linebacker.
