= 1985 All-Pro Team =

Official list of the best NFL players in 1985

The 1985 All-Pro Team is composed of the National Football League players that were named to the Associated Press, Newspaper Enterprise Association, Pro Football Writers Association, and The Sporting News in 1985. Both first- and second- teams are listed for the AP and NEA teams. These are the four teams that are included in Total Football II: The Official Encyclopedia of the National Football League.

Pro Football Weekly, which suspended operations in 1985, did not choose an All-Pro team.

== Teams ==
Offense
Position	First team	Second team
Quarterback	Dan Marino, Miami Dolphins (AP, PFWA, TSN); Dan Fouts, San Diego Chargers (NEA)	Dan Fouts, San Diego Chargers (AP-2); Dan Marino, Miami Dolphins (NEA-2)
Running back	Marcus Allen, Los Angeles Raiders (AP, NEA, PFWA, TSN); Walter Payton, Chicago Bears (AP, NEA, PFWA, TSN)	Gerald Riggs, Atlanta Falcons (AP-2); Roger Craig, San Francisco 49ers (AP-2, NEA-2); Freeman McNeil, New York Jets (NEA-2)
Wide receiver	Steve Largent, Seattle Seahawks (AP, PFWA); Mike Quick, Philadelphia Eagles (AP, NEA, TSN); Louis Lipps, Pittsburgh Steelers (NEA, PFWA); Art Monk, Washington Redskins (TSN)	James Lofton, Green Bay Packers (NEA-2); Steve Largent, Seattle Seahawks (NEA-2); Louis Lipps, Pittsburgh Steelers (AP-2); Art Monk, Washington Redskins (AP-2)
Tight end	Todd Christensen, Los Angeles Raiders (AP, NEA, PFWA, TSN)	Ozzie Newsome, Cleveland Browns (AP-2); Mickey Shuler, New York Jets (NEA-2)
Tackle	Jimbo Covert, Chicago Bears (AP, NEA, PFWA, TSN); Anthony Muñoz, Cincinnati Bengals (AP, NEA, PFWA, TSN)	Brian Holloway, New England Patriots (AP-2); Keith Fahnhorst, San Francisco 49ers (NEA-2); Chris Hinton, Indianapolis Colts (AP-2, NEA-2)
Guard	Russ Grimm, Washington Redskins (AP, NEA, PFWA, TSN); John Hannah, New England Patriots (AP, PFWA, TSN); Randy Cross, San Francisco 49ers (NEA)	Kent Hill, Los Angeles Rams (AP-2); Mike Munchak, Houston Oilers (AP-2, NEA-2); John Hannah, New England Patriots (NEA-2)
Center	Dwight Stephenson, Miami Dolphins (AP, NEA, PFWA, TSN)	Joe Fields, New York Jets (AP-2); Billy Bryan, Denver Broncos (NEA-2)

Special teams
Position	First team	Second team
Kicker	Nick Lowery, Kansas City Chiefs (AP, NEA, PFWA); Morten Andersen, New Orleans Saints (TSN)	Kevin Butler, Chicago Bears (NEA-2); Morten Andersen, New Orleans Saints (AP-2)
Punter	Dale Hatcher, Los Angeles Rams (AP, PFWA, TSN); Rohn Stark, Indianapolis Colts (NEA)	Reggie Roby, Miami Dolphins (NEA-2); Rohn Stark, Indianapolis Colts (AP-2)
Kick Returner	Ron Brown, Los Angeles Rams (AP, PFWA, TSN)	Irving Fryar, New England Patriots (AP-2)
Punt Returner	Henry Ellard, Los Angeles Rams (TSN)	

Defense
Position	First team	Second team
Defensive end	Richard Dent, Chicago Bears (AP, PFWA); Howie Long, Los Angeles Raiders (AP, NEA, PFWA); Mark Gastineau, New York Jets (NEA, TSN); Rulon Jones, Denver Broncos (TSN)	Leonard Marshall, New York Giants (AP-2, NEA-2); Rulon Jones, Denver Broncos (AP-2, NEA-2)
Defensive tackle	Randy White, Dallas Cowboys (AP, NEA, TSN); Joe Klecko, New York Jets (AP-NT, NEA, PFWA); Bob Golic, Cleveland Browns (TSN); Steve McMichael, Chicago Bears (AP)	Michael Carter, San Francisco 49ers (AP-2); Dan Hampton, Chicago Bears (AP-2, NEA-2); Joe Nash, Seattle Seahawks (NEA-2); Bob Golic, Cleveland Browns (AP-2-NT)
Middle linebacker	Karl Mecklenburg, Denver Broncos (AP, NEA, PFWA); Mike Singletary Chicago Bears (AP, NEA, PFWA, TSN); Jim Collins, Los Angeles Rams (TSN)	Lance Mehl, New York Jets (AP-2, NEA-2); Harry Carson, New York Giants (AP-2, NEA-2)
Outside linebacker	Andre Tippett, New England Patriots (AP, NEA, PFWA, TSN); Lawrence Taylor, New York Giants (AP, NEA, PFWA, TSN)	Rickey Jackson, New Orleans Saints (AP-2); Otis Wilson, Chicago Bears (AP-2); Mike Merriweather, Pittsburgh Steelers (NEA-2); Keena Turner, San Francisco 49ers (NEA-2)
Cornerback	Eric Wright, San Francisco 49ers (AP, NEA, TSN); Mike Haynes, Los Angeles Raiders (AP, NEA, PFWA, TSN); Everson Walls, Dallas Cowboys (PFWA)	Everson Walls, Dallas Cowboys (AP-2, NEA-2); Raymond Clayborn, New England Patriots (NEA-2); LeRoy Irvin, Los Angeles Rams (AP-2)
Safety	Wes Hopkins, Philadelphia Eagles (AP, NEA, PFWA, TSN); Kenny Easley, Seattle Seahawks (AP, NEA, PFWA, TSN)	Deron Cherry, Kansas City Chiefs (AP-2, NEA-2); Gary Fencik, Chicago Bears (AP-2); Bo Eason, Houston Oilers (NEA-2)

== Key ==
- AP = Associated Press first-team All-Pro
- AP-2 = Associated Press second-team All-Pro
- NEA = Newspaper Enterprise Association first-team All-Pro team
- NEA-2 = Newspaper Enterprise Association second-team All-Pro team
- PFWA = Pro Football Writers Association All-NFL
- TSN = The Sporting News All-Pro
