= Chris Rockins =

American football player (born 1962)

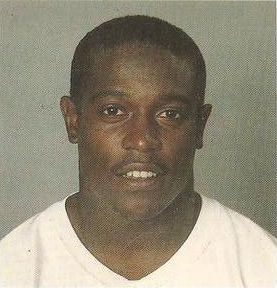

No. 37
- Position: Safety

Personal information
- Born: May 18, 1962 (age 64); Sherman, Texas, U.S.
- Listed height: 6 ft 1 in (1.85 m)
- Listed weight: 195 lb (88 kg)

Career information
- High school: Sherman
- College: Oklahoma State
- NFL draft: 1984: 2nd round, 48th overall pick

Career history
- Cleveland Browns (1984–1987)

Awards and highlights
- Third-team All-American (1983); First-team All-Big Eight (1983)

Career NFL statistics
- Interceptions: 6
- INT yards: 74
- Sacks: 0.5
- Stats at Pro Football Reference

Christopher Alexander Rockins (born May 18, 1962) is an American former professional football player who was a safety in the National Football League (NFL).

Rockins was born and raised in Sherman, Texas and played scholastically at Sherman High School. He played college football for the Oklahoma State Cowboys, where he was a third-team All-American as a senior.

Rockins was selected by the Cleveland Browns in the second round of the 1984 NFL draft. He spent four seasons with the Browns, starting all 16 games during the 1986 season. He recorded six career interceptions.
