= Kevin Potter (American football) =

American football player (born 1959)

No. 20
- Position: Defensive back

Personal information
- Born: December 19, 1959 (age 66); St. Louis, Missouri, U.S.
- Listed height: 5 ft 10 in (1.78 m)
- Listed weight: 188 lb (85 kg)

Career information
- High school: De Smet Jesuit (St. Louis); Soldan (St. Louis)
- College: Missouri
- NFL draft: 1983: 9th round, 226th overall pick

Career history
- Houston Oilers (1983)*; Chicago Bears (1983–1984)
- * Offseason or practice squad member only

Awards and highlights
- First-team All-Big Eight (1981); Second-team All-Big Eight (1982)
- Stats at Pro Football Reference

Kevin Potter (born December 19, 1959) is an American former professional football player who was a defensive back for the Chicago Bears of the National Football League (NFL) from 1983 to 1984. He played college football for the Missouri Tigers. He was selected by the Houston Oilers in the ninth round (226th overall) of the 1983 NFL Draft.
