= 1983 All-Big Eight Conference football team =

American all-star college football team

The 1983 All-Big Eight Conference football team consists of American football players chosen by various organizations for All-Big Eight Conference teams for the 1983 NCAA Division I-A football season. The selectors for the 1983 season included the Associated Press (AP) and United Press International (UPI).

== Offensive selections ==
=== Quarterbacks ===
- Turner Gill, Nebraska (AP-1; UPI-1)
- David Archer, Iowa State (AP-2)

=== Running backs ===
- Mike Rozier, Nebraska (AP-1; UPI-1)
- Shawn Jones, Oklahoma State (AP-1)
- Jason Jacobs, Iowa State (UPI-1)
- Spencer Tillman, Oklahoma (AP-2)
- Earl Johnson, Oklahoma (AP-2)

=== Tight ends ===
- Dave Hestera, Colorado (AP-1; UPI-1)
- John Chesley, Oklahoma State (AP-2)

=== Wide receivers ===
- Irving Fryar, Nebraska (AP-1; UPI-1)
- Tracy Henderson, Iowa State (AP-1; UPI-1)
- Bobby Johnson, Kansas (AP-2)
- Mike Wallace, Kansas State (AP-2)

=== Centers ===
- Chuck Thomas, Oklahoma (AP-1)
- Mark Traynowicz, Nebraska (UPI-1)
- Chuck Meyers, Iowa State (AP-2)

=== Down linemen ===
- Scott Raridon, Nebraska (AP-1; UPI-1)
- Conrad Goode, Missouri (AP-1; UPI-1)
- Dean Steinkuhler, Nebraska (AP-1)
- Kevin Igo, Oklahoma State (AP-1)
- Dean Steinkuhler, Nebraska (UPI-1)
- Paul Parker, Oklahoma (AP-2)
- Bruce Reimers, Iowa State (AP-2; UPI-1)
- Harry Grimminger, Nebraska (AP-2)

== Defensive selections ==
=== Defensive ends ===
- Kevin Murphy, Oklahoma (AP-1; UPI-1)
- Bobby Bell, Missouri (AP-1; UPI-1)
- Taft Sales, Missouri (AP-2)
- L. E. Madison, Kansas State (AP-2)

=== Down linemen ===
- Rick Bryan, Oklahoma (AP-1; UPI-1)
- Leslie O'Neal, Oklahoma State (AP-1; UPI-1)
- Reggie Singletary, Kansas State (AP-1; UPI-1)
- Rodney Harding, Oklahoma State (AP-2)
- Robert Curry, Missouri (AP-2)
- Rob Stuckey, Nebraska (AP-2)

=== Linebackers ===
- Mike Knox, Nebraska (AP-1; UPI-1)
- Jay Wilson, Missouri (AP-1)
- Jackie Shipp, Oklahoma (AP-1)
- Willie Pless, Kansas (AP-2; UPI-1)
- James Spencer, Oklahoma State (AP-2)
- Chris Washington, Iowa State (AP-2)

=== Defensive backs ===
- Scott Case, Oklahoma (AP-1; UPI-1)
- Victor Scott, Colorado (AP-1; UPI-1)
- Bret Clark, Nebraska (AP-1)
- Terry Matichak, Missouri (UPI-1)
- Chris Rockins, Oklahoma State (AP-2; UPI-1)
- Adam Hinds, Oklahoma State (AP-2)
- Keith Stanberry, Oklahoma (AP-2)

== Special teams ==
=== Place-kicker ===
- Bruce Kallmeyer, Kansas (AP-1; UPI-1)
- Larry Roach, Oklahoma State (AP-2)

=== Punter ===
- John Conway, Oklahoma State (AP-1; UPI-1)
- Scott Fulhage, Kansas State (AP-2)

== Key ==
AP = Associated Press

UPI = United Press International

== See also ==
- 1983 College Football All-America Team
