= Andy Gibler =

American football player (born 1961)

No. 48
- Position: Tight end

Personal information
- Born: April 30, 1961 (age 65); Independence, Missouri, U.S.
- Listed height: 6 ft 4 in (1.93 m)
- Listed weight: 235 lb (107 kg)

Career information
- High school: Grandview Grandview, Missouri)
- College: Missouri (1979–1982)
- NFL draft: 1983: undrafted

Career history
- Cleveland Browns (1983)*; Cincinnati Bengals (1983); Orlando Renegades (1985)*
- * Offseason or practice squad member only

Awards and highlights
- 3× Second-team All-Big Eight (1980, 1981, 1982)

Career NFL statistics
- Games played: 2
- Stats at Pro Football Reference

James Andrew Gibler (born April 30, 1961) is an American former professional football player who was a tight end for one season in the National Football League (NFL) with the Cincinnati Bengals. He played college football for the Missouri Tigers and went undrafted in 1983.

== Early life and college ==
Andy Gibler was born on April 30, 1961, in Independence, Missouri. He attended Grandview High School in Grandview, Missouri, playing fullback and defensive end. Gibler enrolled at the University of Missouri, where he reported to football camp as a tight end, despite having no catches in high school (two catches he made were called back by penalty). He competed with Tom Anderson, Tim Hornof, Willie Rogers, Greg Kahl, and James Lockett for tight end, starting the season third on the depth chart behind Anderson and Hornof. After Hornof missed several games due to mononucleosis, Gibler moved up to number two on the depth chart. For the sixth game of the season, against Colorado, he was named the team's starter. In the game, Gibler made two catches for 47 yards and scored the game-winning touchdown in a 13–7 win. He finished the year with 23 receptions for 316 yards, leading the school.

In 1980, Gibler remained the team's starting tight end and posted 80 receiving yards in a win over Colorado. He made 26 catches for 298 yards on the season, which earned him second-team all-Big Eight Conference honors. As a junior, he made 27 catches, but "slumped" and made some "crucial drops," having "lost his concentration," according to coach Warren Powers. As a senior, Gibler rebounded, and had 17 receptions for 298 yards through the first seven weeks of the season. In week six, he broke the all-time Missouri record for career catches, surpassing Joe Stewart. At the end of the year, Gibler was named second-team all-conference.

== Professional career ==
After going unselected in the 1983 NFL draft, Gibler was signed by the Cleveland Browns as an undrafted free agent. Gibler was also selected in the 18th round (211th overall) of the 1983 USFL draft by the Chicago Blitz, who traded his rights to the Denver Gold, but opted not to play for them. He was released by the Browns on August 23. After being released by the Browns, he was claimed off waivers by the Cincinnati Bengals, who later waived him on August 29. He was later re-signed in October, and appeared in two regular season games: a 38–10 win over the Houston Oilers in week 12, and a 14–38 loss versus the Miami Dolphins in the following week. He was released by the Bengals at the final roster cuts in 1984.

In 1985, Gibler was signed by the Orlando Renegades of the United States Football League (USFL), but did not make the final roster.

== Later life ==
Gibler later became a manager for the National Nuclear Security Administration (NNSA).
