= Jackie Shipp =

American football player and coach (born 1962)

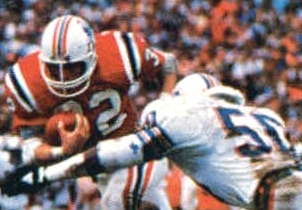
- Shipp (right) picture in a defensive play during the 1985-86 AFC Championship game

No. 50, 58
- Position: Linebacker

Personal information
- Born: March 19, 1962 (age 64); Muskogee, Oklahoma, U.S.
- Listed height: 6 ft 2 in (1.88 m)
- Listed weight: 235 lb (107 kg)

Career information
- College: Oklahoma
- NFL draft: 1984: 1st round, 14th overall pick

Career history

Playing
- Miami Dolphins (1984–1988); Los Angeles Raiders (1989)

Coaching
- Langston (1991) – Grad Asst.; Central Missouri State (1992) – DL; Tennessee–Martin (1993) – DL; Green Bay Packers (1994) – Intern; Southern Illinois (1994–96) – DL; Minnesota Vikings (1995–96) – Intern; Northeast Louisiana (1997) – DL; Alabama (1998) – DL; Oklahoma (1999–2012) – DL; Arizona State (2013–15) – DL; Missouri (2016) – DL; Trinity Valley (2018) – DL; Nevada (2019–2021) – DL

Awards and highlights
- National (2000); Second-team All-American (1983); 2× First-team All-Big Eight (1982, 1983)

Career NFL statistics
- Sacks: 1
- Fumble recoveries: 3
- Interceptions: 1
- Stats at Pro Football Reference

Jackie Vernold Shipp (born March 19, 1962) is an American football coach and former player. Shipp was the defensive line coach for the Oklahoma Sooners football team until his departure in the 2013 offseason. He had been on the Sooners' coaching staff since the arrival of Bob Stoops in 1999. He was the defensive line coach at Arizona State from 2013 to 2015, and was the defensive line coach at the University of Missouri for part of the 2016 season.

Shipp played high school football in Stillwater, Oklahoma where he was raised. He played college football at the University of Oklahoma. Shipp holds the all-time OU record for tackles in a single game with 22 and tackles in a single season with 189 (12 games). He is second in career tackles to Daryl Hunt. He was a second-team All-America selection in 1983.

He played six seasons in the NFL for the Miami Dolphins from 1984 to 1988 and the Los Angeles Raiders in 1989. He was selected in the first round of the 1984 NFL draft with the 14th overall pick.
