= 1981 All-Big Eight Conference football team =

American all-star college football team

The 1981 All-Big Eight Conference football team consists of American football players chosen by various organizations for All-Big Eight Conference teams for the 1981 NCAA Division I-A football season. The selectors for the 1981 season included the Associated Press (AP) and United Press International (UPI).

== Offensive selections ==
=== Quarterbacks ===
- Turner Gill, Nebraska (AP-1; UPI-2)
- John Quinn, Iowa State (AP-2; UPI-1)

=== Running backs ===
- Mike Rozier, Nebraska (AP-1; UPI-1)
- Stanley Wilson, Oklahoma (AP-1; UPI-1)
- Dwayne Crutchfield, Iowa State (AP-1; UPI-1)
- Roger Craig, Nebraska (AP-2; UPI-2)
- Bob Meyer, Missouri (AP-2; UPI-2)
- Shawn Jones, Oklahoma State (AP-2)
- Phil Bales, Nebraska (UPI-2)

=== Tight ends ===
- Jamie Williams, Nebraska (AP-1; UPI-1)
- Andy Gibler, Missouri (AP-2; UPI-2)

=== Wide receivers ===
- Wayne Capers, Kansas (AP-1; UPI-1)
- James Caver, Missouri (AP-2; UPI-2)

=== Centers ===
- Dave Rimington, Nebraska (AP-1; UPI-1)
- Brad Edelman, Missouri (AP-2; UPI-2)

=== Offensive guards ===
- Terry Crouch, Oklahoma (AP-1; UPI-1)
- Don Key, Oklahoma (AP-1; UPI-1)
- David Lawrence, Kansas (AP-2; UPI-2)
- Mike Mandelko, Nebraska (AP-2)
- Vince Rafferty, Colorado (UPI-2)

=== Offensive tackles ===
- Dan Hurley, Nebraska (AP-1; UPI-1)
- Lyndle Byford, Oklahoma (AP-1; UPI-2)
- Karl Nelson, Iowa State (AP-2; UPI-1)
- Randy Theiss, Nebraska (AP-2)
- Conrad Goode, Missouri (UPI-2)

== Defensive selections ==
=== Defensive ends ===
- Reggie Singletary, Kansas State (AP-1; UPI-1)
- Jimmy Williams, Nebraska (AP-1; UPI-1)
- Pete Perry, Colorado (AP-2; UPI-1)
- Bryan Horn, Kansas (AP-2; UPI-2)
- Tony Felici, Nebraska (UPI-2)

=== Defensive tackles ===
- Jeff Gaylord, Missouri (AP-1; UPI-1)
- Rick Bryan, Oklahoma (AP-1; UPI-2)
- Shamus McDonough, Iowa State (AP-2; UPI-2)
- Henry Waechter, Nebraska (AP-2)

=== Nose guards ===
- Gary Lewis, Oklahoma State (AP-1; UPI-1)
- Greg Smith, Kansas (AP-2; UPI-2)

=== Linebackers ===
- Ricky Young, Oklahoma State (AP-1; UPI-1)
- Kyle McNorton, Kansas (AP-1; UPI-1)
- Mike Green, Oklahoma State (AP-2; UPI-2)
- Steve Damkroger, Nebraska (AP-2; UPI-2)

=== Defensive backs ===
- Kevin Potter, Missouri (AP-1; UPI-1)
- Pete DiClementi, Oklahoma State (AP-1; UPI-1)
- Joe Brown, Iowa State (AP-1; UPI-1)
- Joe Krejci, Nebraska (AP-1; UPI-1)
- Gary Morrill, Kansas State (AP-2; UPI-2)
- Victor Scott, Colorado (AP-2; UPI-2)
- Demetrious Johnson, Missouri (AP-2)
- Ric Lindquist, Nebraska (UPI-2)
- Ronnie Osborne, Iowa State (UPI-2)

== Special teams ==
=== Place-kicker ===
- Ron Verrilli, Missouri (AP-1)
- Larry Roach, Oklahoma State (UPI-1)
- Bruce Kallmeyer, Kansas (AP-2; UPI-2)

=== Punter ===
- Bucky Scribner, Kansas (AP-1; UPI-1)
- Grant Campbell, Nebraska (AP-2; UPI-2)

== Key ==
AP = Associated Press

UPI = United Press International

== See also ==
- 1981 College Football All-America Team
