= Doug Dawson =

American football player (born 1961)

No. 66, 69
- Position: Guard

Personal information
- Born: December 27, 1961 (age 64); Houston, Texas, U.S.
- Listed height: 6 ft 3 in (1.91 m)
- Listed weight: 238 lb (108 kg)

Career information
- High school: Memorial (Hedwig Village, Texas)
- College: Texas
- NFL draft: 1984: 2nd round, 45th overall pick

Career history
- St. Louis Cardinals (1984–1986); Houston Oilers (1990–1993); Cleveland Browns (1994)

Awards and highlights
- Consensus All-American (1983); First-team All-SWC (1983)

Career NFL statistics
- Games played: 106
- Games started: 70
- Fumble recoveries: 3
- Stats at Pro Football Reference

Douglas Arlin Dawson (born December 27, 1961) is an American former professional football player who was a guard for 11 seasons in the National Football League (NFL) in the 1980s and 1990s. Dawson played college football for the Texas Longhorns, receiving All-American and Academic All-American honors as a senior, and was selected by the St. Louis Cardinals in the second round of the 1984 NFL draft. He also played for the Houston Oilers and Cleveland Browns.

== Biography ==
Dawson was born in Houston, Texas. He graduated from and played football for Memorial High School and helped them reach their first and only state championship game that year, which they lost to Temple.

In 1997 he was named to Texas Football Magazine's All-Time Texas High School Football Team.

== College career ==
He attended the University of Texas at Austin in Austin, Texas, where he was an offensive lineman for the Longhorns from 1980 to 1983.

His freshman year the Longhorns went to the Astro Bluebonnet Bowl.

In 1981, he played on a Longhorn team that upset Alabama in the Cotton Bowl and finished ranked #2/#4.

In 1982, he helped the team reach the Sun Bowl and finished ranked #17/#18.

In 1983, his senior year, he was a team co-captain. He helped the Longhorns get a #2 ranking, win the Southwest Conference and play in the Cotton Bowl. They lost by one point when a win would have earned them the National Championship, but instead finished #5. He received the American Airlines Spirit Award, was recognized as a consensus first-team All-American, an Academic All-American and was a Lombardi Trophy finalist.

After finishing his career at Texas he played in the 1984 Hula Bowl and received a degree in petroleum engineering.

In 1997 he was named to the Longhorn Hall of Honor.

== Pro career ==
=== St. Louis Cardinals ===
The St. Louis Cardinals selected Dawson in the second round (45th pick overall) in the 1984 NFL draft, and he played for the Cardinals from 1984 to 1986.

In 1984 he was a back-up on an offensive line that enabled Neil Lomax to throw for 4,614 yards, 2nd most in the NFL, and make the Pro Bowl.

In 1985 he was a full-time starter.

In 1986, he ruptured his Achilles' tendon in the first game of the season and missed the rest of the season.

In August of 1987 he failed his preseason physical and aggravated his tendon during rehab. He had to have surgery to remove a bone from around his tendon and would miss the 1987 season too. Calculating that he would more than likely never play again, the Cardinals waived him. He swore he would prove them wrong.

He spent the next three years selling insurance and had two more surgeries to recover.

=== Houston Oilers ===
In 1990, Dawson decided he was ready for a comeback so he contacted the Houston Oilers and they gave him a tryout. They signed him in May. He made the team and played back-up for most of the season, but took over as starter for the last game of the season and in the playoff game. At the end of the season, he signed a 3 year contract with the Oilers.

For the next three seasons he was a starter for all but 6 games, helped them make the playoffs every year and win the AFC Central in both 1991 and 1993. At the end of the 1994 season he became a free agent and was signed by the Cleveland Browns hours after they learned that Mike Schad would require surgery on a tendon in his arm.

=== Cleveland Browns ===
Dawson played his final season for the Cleveland Browns. In a pre-season game he was poked in the eye, causing him to miss the first two games of the season. Due to a rash of injuries, Dawson played center for the first time in his life in a September game against the Colts. After seeing limited play in the first 9 games of the season, Dawson became the starter following an injury to Wally Williams and he started for the rest of the season. He helped the Browns make it to the Divisional Round of the playoffs before losing to the Pittsburgh Steelers in his final game.

He became an unrestricted free agent in the offseason, but was not signed by another team.

During his NFL career, he played in a total of 106 NFL games with 70 starts and 3 fumble recoveries, as well as 7 playoff games.

== Later life ==
Following his retirement from the NFL, he became an insurance and investment salesman. Later he became a wealth management advisor in the Houston area for Northwestern Mutual Wealth Management Company where he ranked in the company's top 20 all-time. After several years, he formed his own company Dawson Financial Services.

In 2004 he was elected to the Piney Point Village City Council where he served until 2008.
