= Mike Green (American football, born 1961) =

American football player (born 1961)

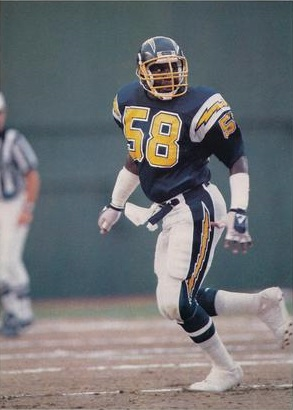
- Green c. 1985

No. 58
- Position: Linebacker

Personal information
- Born: June 29, 1961 (age 65); Port Arthur, Texas, U.S.
- Listed height: 6 ft 0 in (1.83 m)
- Listed weight: 235 lb (107 kg)

Career information
- High school: Lincoln (Port Arthur)
- College: Oklahoma State
- NFL draft: 1983: 9th round, 245th overall pick

Career history
- San Diego Chargers (1983–1985)

Awards and highlights
- PFWA All-Rookie Team (1983); First-team All-Big Eight (1982); 2× Second-team All-Big Eight (1980, 1981)

Career NFL statistics
- Sacks: 3.0
- Interceptions: 3
- Fumble recoveries: 3
- Stats at Pro Football Reference

Michael James Green (born June 29, 1961) is an American former professional football player who was a linebacker for three seasons for the San Diego Chargers. He was selected by the San Diego Chargers in the ninth round (245th overall) of the 1983 NFL Draft.
