= Karl Nelson =

American football player (born 1960)

No. 63
- Position: Offensive tackle

Personal information
- Born: June 14, 1960 (age 66); DeKalb, Illinois, U.S.
- Listed height: 6 ft 6 in (1.98 m)
- Listed weight: 285 lb (129 kg)

Career information
- High school: DeKalb
- College: Iowa State
- NFL draft: 1983: 3rd round, 70th overall pick

Career history
- New York Giants (1983–1988)

Awards and highlights
- Super Bowl champion (XXI); George Halas Award (1989); First-team All-American (1982); First-team All-Big Eight (1982); 2× Second-team All-Big Eight (1980, 1981)

Career NFL statistics
- Games: 57
- Games started: 51
- Fumble recoveries: 2
- Stats at Pro Football Reference

Karl Stuart Nelson (born June 14, 1960) is an American former professional football player who was an offensive tackle in the National Football League (NFL).

Born and raised in DeKalb, Illinois, Nelson played scholastically at DeKalb High School, where he earned all-state honors in football, was a star pitcher for the baseball team, and lettered in basketball.

He played collegiately for the Iowa State Cyclones. As a junior, Nelson was named second-team All-Big Eight by the Associated Press (AP) and as a senior was tabbed first-team. Also as a senior, he was honored by the Newspaper Enterprise Association as a first-team All-American.

Nelson was selected 70th overall by the New York Giants in the third-round of the 1983 NFL draft. He spent his rookie season on the injured reserve list, but started all 55 games at right tackle over the next three seasons, culminating with the Giants victory in Super Bowl XXI.

Shortly after the Super Bowl, Nelson was diagnosed with Hodgkin's disease, and sat out the 1987 season. He made an amazing comeback in 1988, regaining his starting job, but injured his ankle in week 2. He returned from the injury in week 9, appearing in 7 more games that season. His Hodgkin's disease returned in 1989, forcing him to sit out yet another season, although he did help to coach the team's offensive line. He announced his retirement on December 13, 1989, saying, "I don't have the push for those five-hour workout days anymore."

In 1989, Nelson was the recipient of the George Halas Award, given by the Pro Football Writers of America (PFWA) to an NFL player, coach or staff member who overcomes the most adversity to succeed.

He also served as a commentator on Giants radio broadcasts.

Nelson went on to work in the financial services industry, and in 1993 published an autobiography, "Life on the Line".

Nelson currently resides with his wife, Inga, in Northern New Jersey and is an active advocate for various charities. His primary charity is Adopt-a-Soldier Platoon.

== See also ==
- History of the New York Giants (1979–93)

== Bibliography ==
- Nelson, Karl; Stanton, Barry (1993). Life on the Line. Waco, Texas: WRS Publishing. ISBN 9781567960518.
