= Demetrious Johnson (American football) =

American football player (1961–2022)

No. 21, 23
- Position: Safety

Personal information
- Born: July 21, 1961; St. Louis, Missouri, U.S.
- Died: December 24, 2022 (aged 61)
- Listed height: 5 ft 11 in (1.80 m)
- Listed weight: 190 lb (86 kg)

Career information
- High school: McKinley (St. Louis, Missouri)
- College: Missouri
- NFL draft: 1983: 2nd round, 31st overall pick

Career history
- Detroit Lions (1983–1986); Miami Dolphins (1987); San Diego Chargers (1988)*
- * Offseason or practice squad member only

Awards and highlights
- First-team All-Big Eight (1982); Second-team All-Big Eight (1981)

Career NFL statistics
- Interceptions: 5
- Sacks: 3
- Fumble recoveries: 9
- Stats at Pro Football Reference

Demetrious Johnson (July 21, 1961 – December 24, 2022) was an American professional football player in the National Football League (NFL), having played for the Detroit Lions and the Miami Dolphins.

Johnson was a native St. Louisan who grew up in the Darst-Webbe Housing Project. He was the youngest of eight children and was raised by a single parent. He attended his freshman year at pattonville high school. He then graduated from McKinley High School, and earned a full athletic scholarship to attend the University of Missouri, Columbia.

During his years at Columbia, Johnson was recognized as a premier defensive back, including Big 8 All Star. He graduated with a bachelor's degree in Education with a major in Counseling Psychology. Upon graduation, the Detroit Lions drafted him.

Johnson’s professional football career lasted five years, ending with the Miami Dolphins in 1987. During his career, Johnson was the Lions' defensive captain and earned numerous awards, including Player of the Week. In 1985 Johnson, led the Detroit Lions in tackles with 186 and was second in the league in interceptions.

Following his retirement from pro football, Johnson joined Sherwood Medical Company, which is now Covidien, as the National Sales Manager for the Athletic Sports Medicine Division.

Understanding the importance of the community recreation center during his childhood, Johnson started exploring ways to give back to his community. With a deep desire to encourage and support underprivileged children to reach their potential, Johnson founded the Demetrious Johnson Charitable Foundation, Inc.

Johnson was married to his high school sweetheart for over 25 years with whom he had three daughters: Ashley, Taylore, and Alexandria. He had one other daughter, Lakisha. Johnson also has a son Jalen Johnson a junior who attends pattonville high school. And a daughter Sidney Allen who attended St Louis University.

Johnson died on December 24, 2022, at the age of 61. News reports said Johnson died of an aortic dissection, a rare condition in which a tear occurs in the inner layer of the body's main artery, at a St. Louis hospital.

Johnson is buried at Laurel Hill Memorial Gardens
