= Chris Washington (American football) =

American football player (born 1962)

No. 54, 51, 52
- Position: Linebacker

Personal information
- Born: March 6, 1962 (age 64); Jackson, Mississippi, U.S.
- Listed height: 6 ft 4 in (1.93 m)
- Listed weight: 220 lb (100 kg)

Career information
- High school: Julian (Chicago, Illinois)
- College: Iowa State
- NFL draft: 1984: 6th round, 142nd overall pick

Career history
- Tampa Bay Buccaneers (1984–1988); San Francisco 49ers (1989); Phoenix Cardinals (1990); San Francisco 49ers (1991)*
- * Offseason or practice squad member only

Awards and highlights
- Super Bowl champion (XXIV); 2× Second-team All-Big Eight (1982, 1983)

Career NFL statistics
- Sacks: 17.5
- Interceptions: 1
- Fumble recoveries: 4
- Stats at Pro Football Reference

Christopher Washington (born March 6, 1962) is an American former professional football player who was a linebacker in the National Football League (NFL). He played college football for the Iowa State Cyclones before playing in the NFL for the Tampa Bay Buccaneers, San Francisco 49ers, and Phoenix Cardinals. Washington was a member of the 49ers Super Bowl championship team in 1989.

== Professional career ==
In his seven seasons in the NFL, Washington played five years with the Tampa Bay Buccaneers, one year with the Phoenix Cardinals, and a year with the San Francisco 49ers. Washington still holds the leading record in tackles with 457 at Iowa State University and is a member of the Omega Psi Phi fraternity. Washington's career ended as a result of injuries. He was inducted into the Iowa State Cyclones Hall of Fame in 2009.

== Personal life ==
Washington resides in Gilbert, Arizona.
