= Chuck Thomas (American football) =

American football player (born 1960)

No. 66, 60
- Position: Center

Personal information
- Born: December 24, 1960 (age 65); Houston, Texas, U.S.
- Listed height: 6 ft 3 in (1.91 m)
- Listed weight: 277 lb (126 kg)

Career information
- High school: Stratford (Houston)
- College: Oklahoma
- NFL draft: 1985: 8th round, 199th overall pick

Career history
- Houston Oilers (1985)*; Atlanta Falcons (1985); San Francisco 49ers (1987–1992)
- * Offseason or practice squad member only

Awards and highlights
- 2× Super Bowl champion (XXIII, XXIV); First-team All-Big Eight (1983); 2× Second-team All-Big Eight (1982, 1984)

Career NFL statistics
- Games played: 73
- Games started: 3
- Stats at Pro Football Reference

Charles Gene Thomas (born December 24, 1960) is an American former professional football player who was a center in the National Football League (NFL). He played college football for the Oklahoma Sooners and was selected by the Houston Oilers in the eighth round of the 1985 NFL draft. He played seven seasons in the NFL, for the Atlanta Falcons in 1985 and the San Francisco 49ers from 1987 to 1992.

Thomas owns a rare hat trick in the world of American football. He played on teams which won championships at three levels of competition. In 1978, he was a member of the Stratford High School Spartans which won the Class 4A Texas State High School Championship. In 1985, he was a member of the Sooners team which won the NCAA Division I nationalchampionship. In 1988 and 1989, he was a member of the 49ers which won Super Bowl XXIII and Super Bowl XXIV respectively.
