= Jamie Williams (American football) =

American football player (born 1960)

No. 85, 87, 81, 88
- Position: Tight end

Personal information
- Born: February 27, 1960 (age 66); Fort Pierce, Florida, U.S.
- Listed height: 6 ft 4 in (1.93 m)
- Listed weight: 240 lb (109 kg)

Career information
- High school: Davenport Central (Davenport, Iowa)
- College: Nebraska
- NFL draft: 1983: 3rd round, 63rd overall pick

Career history
- New York Giants (1983)*; St. Louis Cardinals (1983); Tampa Bay Buccaneers (1984)*; Houston Oilers (1984–1988); San Francisco 49ers (1989–1993); Los Angeles Raiders (1994)
- * Offseason or practice squad member only

Awards and highlights
- Super Bowl champion (XXIV); 2× First-team All-Big Eight (1981, 1982)

Career NFL statistics
- Receptions: 181
- Receiving yards: 1,980
- Touchdowns: 11
- Stats at Pro Football Reference

Jamie Earl Williams (born February 27, 1960) is an American former professional football player who was a tight end for 12 seasons in the National Football League (NFL), mainly for the Houston Oilers and the San Francisco 49ers. After his NFL career, along with years as a management consultant in Silicon Valley and a collegiate athletic administrator, Williams launched Team81 Inc., a professional and IT services company. Williams serves as president and CEO of Team81 Inc.

== Early life ==
Williams was born in Fort Pierce, Florida and played football, basketball, and track at Davenport Central High School in Davenport, Iowa, graduating in 1978. At Central High, he was Class and Student Council Vice President, and captain of the school's Poetry Club. As a Parade All-American High School Football player, he chose Nebraska from numerous scholarship offers for both football and basketball. Williams was inducted into the Quad Cities Sports Hall of Fame in 2000. As a first-generation college student, Williams played tight end for 4 years at the University of Nebraska-Lincoln. He was a four-year letter winner and earned All-Big Eight and All-American honors in 1981 and 1982.

Williams was inducted into the University of Nebraska Chapter of the College Football Hall of Fame in 2002.

== Education ==
Williams graduated from the University of Nebraska–Lincoln in 1990 with a bachelor's degree in broadcast journalism. He completed a Masters of Science in mass communication and film, at San Jose State University in 1993. Receiving the “Black Graduate of the Year Award,” he completed a Doctorate of Education in organization and leadership with an emphasis in sports administration, at the University of San Francisco in 1999. As part of his dissertation research, Williams interviewed a range of leaders that included the Archbishop Desmond Tutu shortly after the end of apartheid in Cape Town, South Africa. Williams also achieved a Masters in Business Administration with a specialization in international business and supply chain in 2020 from the University of Nebraska–Lincoln.

Williams received the Kennedy Laureate Award from JFK University in 2000, and the Alumni Master's Award from the University of Nebraska–Lincoln in 2003. He also received an Honorary Doctorate in 2013 from the Academy of Art University in San Francisco.

== Professional career ==
Williams was selected 63rd overall in the third round of the 1983 NFL Draft by the New York Giants and played 12 seasons in the NFL as a tight end, with the St. Louis Cardinals, Houston Oilers, San Francisco 49ers and the Los Angeles Raiders. He was team “Man-of-the-Year” four times for community service. Williams is also the first NFL player with dreadlocks.

Williams is a science fiction and comic book fan. He has an extensive collection, particularly of Marvel Comics’ Spider-Man and Conan the Barbarian. He used the concept of “hero” to psych himself up for the violence inherent in professional football

Upon NFL retirement, Williams began further graduate work and became a management consultant in Silicon Valley. He also served over a decade as on-air talent for Fox Sports and KSJO's “Lamont and Tonelli Show” in the San Francisco Bay Area. Williams worked with director Oliver Stone on the 1999 motion picture production and release of Any Given Sunday as a writer, technical advisor, and actor. He continues both content creation and business consulting.

Williams spent six years as the inaugural athletic director for the Academy of Art University Urban Knights. He now sits on its board of directors. Before Williams' hiring, Academy of Art had no history of or infrastructure for intercollegiate athletics. Williams and his young entrepreneurial staff successfully created the only art institution in the NCAA, which included over 200 student-athletes in 16 sports. Established in 2006, the program won numerous conference and regional championships, including two national championships.

Williams served as the associate athletic director of diversity and leadership initiatives at his alma mater, the University of Nebraska–Lincoln, for three years, before refocusing on entrepreneurial pursuits. He quickly joined an American team of business/tech advisors to establish the Bulgarian Entrepreneurship Center, where he taught graduate leadership at Varna Free University in Varna, Bulgaria. He also advised and consulted with emerging Bulgarian companies, such as Titan Gate (Varna) and Office R&D (Sofia).

Williams currently owns and is president and CEO of a professional and IT services company, Team81 Inc. focused on both the government and commercial markets.

== Media ==
Williams appeared on KTVU news as a sports analyst for a number of years. He was a regular guest of radio shock jocks “Lamont and Tonelli Show,” as the Rock-n-Roll Tight End. He made popular a special segment called “Trust a Brotha.” As the initial writer and technical consultant of the movie Any Given Sunday, Williams worked closely with the director, Oliver Stone, and actors Jamie Foxx, Al Pacino, Dennis Quaid, John C. McGinley, Matthew Modine, and LL Cool J to develop the professional football movie. He also started a small production company that created content of varying genres for future development, which includes 51 Dons, Between Fire and Ice, Jungle Love, Roth, and Renegade Hoops.
