= Kevin Murphy (linebacker) =

American football player (born 1963)

No. 59, 58, 98
- Position: Linebacker

Personal information
- Born: September 8, 1963 (age 63); Dallas, Texas, U.S.
- Listed height: 6 ft 2 in (1.88 m)
- Listed weight: 233 lb (106 kg)

Career information
- High school: Berkner (Richardson, Texas)
- College: Oklahoma
- NFL draft: 1986: 2nd round, 40th overall pick

Career history
- Tampa Bay Buccaneers (1986–1991); San Diego Chargers (1992); Seattle Seahawks (1993)

Awards and highlights
- National champion (1985); First-team All-American (1985); Second-team All-American (1983); 3× First-team All-Big Eight (1982, 1983, 1985)

Career NFL statistics
- Sacks: 12
- Fumble recoveries: 5
- Interceptions: 1
- Stats at Pro Football Reference

Kevin Dion Murphy (born September 8, 1963) is an American former professional football player who was a linebacker for the Tampa Bay Buccaneers, San Diego Chargers, and Seattle Seahawks in the National Football League (NFL). He was selected by the Buccaneers in the second round of the 1986 NFL draft. He was converted from defensive lineman to a linebacker in the NFL. Murphy was ranked 80th on the USA Today Sports Weekly list of the top 100 players in Buccaneers’ franchise history. Individuals chosen to be on the list were selected based on their overall positive contributions that they made during their playing career.

Murphy played college football for the Oklahoma Sooners. He was an All-Conference selection in 1982, 1983, and 1985 and an All-American in 1985. In a 247Sports article titled “Ranking Oklahoma’s 5 best football teams of all time,” Murphy was favorably mentioned regarding his “All-American” season while playing on ”Switzer’s third and final National Title team” in 1985.
