= Mike Knox (American football) =

American football player (born 1962)

No. 56
- Position: Linebacker

Personal information
- Born: November 21, 1962 (age 63); Boulder, Colorado, U.S.
- Listed height: 6 ft 2 in (1.88 m)
- Listed weight: 240 lb (109 kg)

Career information
- High school: Douglas County (Castle Rock, Colorado)
- College: Nebraska (1981–1985)
- NFL draft: 1986: undrafted

Career history
- Houston Oilers (1986–1987)*; Denver Broncos (1987); Indianapolis Colts (1988)*
- * Offseason or practice squad member only

Awards and highlights
- First-team All-Big Eight (1983)
- Stats at Pro Football Reference

Michael Alan Knox (born November 21, 1962) is an American former professional football player who was a linebacker for the Denver Broncos of the National Football League (NFL). He played college football for the Nebraska Cornhuskers.

== Early life ==
Michael Alan Knox was born on November 21, 1962, in Boulder, Colorado. He played high school football at Douglas County High School in Castle Rock, Colorado, as a fullback and linebacker, earning all-state and All-American honors. He also won two state heavyweight wrestling titles.

== College career ==
Knox played college football for the Nebraska Cornhuskers of the University of Nebraska–Lincoln. He earned a varsity letter as a true freshman in 1981. He was the only freshman on the team that year to earn a letter. Knox posted six solo tackles, seven assisted tackles, one fumble recovery, and one pass breakup. He was a backup at weakside linebacker in 1982, recording 25 solo tackles, 17 assisted tackles, and three pass breakups.

Knox became a starter his junior year in 1983. He was named the Big Eight Player of the Week for posting a career-high 17 tackles in a 34–13 win over the Missouri Tigers. Overall during the 1983 season, Knox totaled 64 solo tackles, 61 assisted tackles, one sack, six pass breakups, and four interceptions, one of which was returned for a touchdown. His 125 tackles were the most on the team while his four interceptions were the most by an Nebraska linebacker since 1970. He was named first-team All-Big Eight by both the Associated Press and United Press International.

Knox suffered a season-ending knee injury in the 1984 spring game. He became a team captain as a senior in 1985. He was second on the team in tackles with 65, totaling 29 solo tackles, 36 assisted tackles, one sack, two fumble recoveries, two interceptions, and three pass breakups.

Knox also wrestled for the Cornhuskers. He finished third in the Big Eight Championships, which qualified him for the 1983 NCAA Championships. He was inducted into the Nebraska Football Hall of Fame in 2004.

== Professional career ==
Knox signed with the Houston Oilers on May 13, 1986, after going undrafted in the 1986 NFL draft. He was released on August 18, 1986. He signed with Houston again on May 12, 1987. Knox was waived in July 1987 after failing a physical.

On September 23, 1987, Knox signed with the Denver Broncos during the 1987 NFL players strike. He played in all three strike games for the Broncos. He was released on October 19, 1987, after the strike ended.

Knox signed with the Indianapolis Colts on May 2, 1988, but was later released on August 29, 1988.
