= Turner Gill =

American football coach and former player (born 1962)

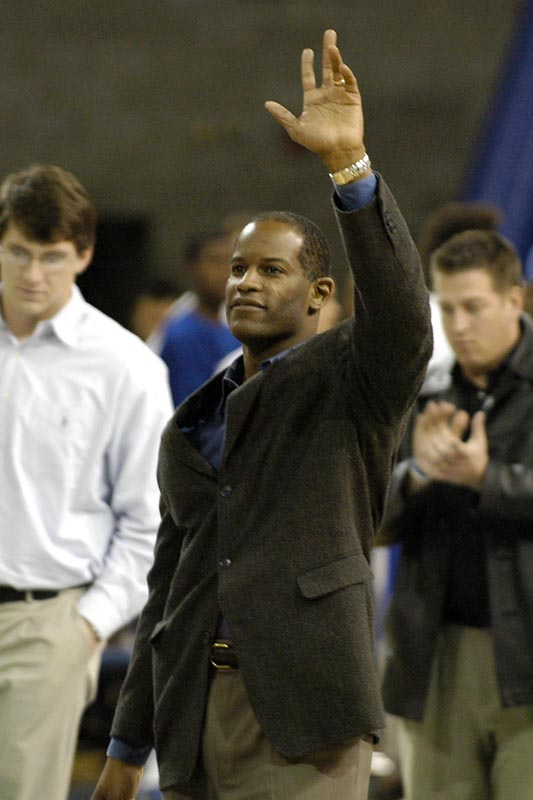
- Gill in 2006

Current position
- Title: Executive director of student-athlete and staff development
- Team: Arkansas
- Conference: SEC

Biographical details
- Born: August 13, 1962 (age 64); Fort Worth, Texas, U.S.

Playing career
- 1980–1983: Nebraska
- 1984–1985: Montreal Concordes
- Position: Quarterback

Coaching career (HC unless noted)
- 1989: Nebraska (GA)
- 1990: North Texas (GA)
- 1991: SMU (WR)
- 1992–2002: Nebraska (QB)
- 2003: Nebraska (AHC)
- 2004: Nebraska (WR)
- 2006–2009: Buffalo
- 2010–2011: Kansas
- 2012–2018: Liberty

Administrative career (AD unless noted)
- 2005: Green Bay Packers (dir. player development)
- 2018–2019: Liberty (EVP of diversity development & inclusion)
- 2019–2020: Arkansas (Dir. Student-Athlete and Staff Development)

Head coaching record
- Overall: 72–84
- Bowls: 0–1
- Tournaments: 1–1

Accomplishments and honors

Championships
- 1 MAC (2008); 2 MAC East Division (2007, 2008); 4 Big South co-champions (2012, 2013, 2014, 2016)

Awards
- MAC Coach of the Year (2007); Second-team All-American (1983); 3× First-team All-Big Eight (1981, 1982, 1983)

Turner Hillery Gill (born August 13, 1962) is an American college athletic administrator and former football player and coach. He is the Executive Director of Student-Athlete and Staff Development at the University of Arkansas, a position he assumed in 2019. Gill has served as head football coach at the University at Buffalo (2006–09), the University of Kansas (2010–11), and Liberty University (2012–18), compiling a career college football coaching record of 72–84. He was one of 11 black head coaches in the NCAA Division I Football Bowl Subdivision at the time of his hiring at Kansas.

== Playing career ==
=== College ===
Gill graduated from Arlington Heights High School in Fort Worth, Texas, where he was an all-state, all-county, and all-district quarterback for Coach Merlin Priddy. During his senior season, Gill was courted heavily by Nebraska, as well as archrivals Oklahoma, and Texas. Nebraska won the spirited battle for Gill, in part because they would allow Turner to play baseball as well as football, but also because head coach Tom Osborne had managed to quell any rumors about Nebraska supposedly being reluctant to play an African-American at quarterback.

Gill arrived on campus in 1980 and saw limited action in mop-up duty as a freshman, which at the time was still relatively unusual, as freshmen had only been recently allowed under NCAA rules to participate at the varsity level.

Nebraska started the 1981 season poorly, losing two of its first three games and performing anemically on offense at times in all three. Gill had found himself third on the depth chart prior to the Huskers season opener, behind Mark Mauer and Nate Mason.

Down 3–0 to Auburn at halftime during the fourth game, with the season on the verge of slipping away, Osborne inserted Gill into the game. The Huskers pulled out a 17–3 victory, and Gill was given the starting job the following week. Behind Gill, the Huskers demolished Colorado 59–0, thus setting off an unbeaten run through the Big 8 conference, which Nebraska would win outright for the first time since 1971. During the season's penultimate game against Iowa State, however, Gill suffered what initially appeared to be an innocuous leg injury. Instead, doctors discovered nerve damage that sidelined him for the remainder of the 1981 season. Although the Huskers would beat Oklahoma without him, they were not able to overcome a stingy Clemson defense in the Orange Bowl, where a win may have given the Huskers a possible national championship.

Gill came back strong during 1982 and led the Huskers to a second consecutive outright Big 8 title and a 12–1 record overall, losing only a controversial game at eventual national champion Penn State in September. During that season, he suffered the first of many concussions in a game against Missouri that would ultimately shorten his playing career.

During his senior season, Turner would call the signals for one of the most prolific offenses in college football history, averaging 52 points and 401 rushing yards per game. Gill finished fourth in the voting for the 1983 Heisman Trophy, which was won by teammate Mike Rozier. The Huskers came within a whisker of a national championship, falling to the University of Miami, just one point short following a failed two-point conversion attempt in the 1984 Orange Bowl.

Overall, Gill finished with a 28–2 record in his three years as a starter, winning three consecutive outright Big Eight championships with a perfect 20–0 mark in conference play. Despite this, he was unable to lead the Huskers to a national title, falling agonizingly short in each of his three seasons.

=== College football statistics ===
Season	Passing						Rushing			
Season	Cmp	Att	Pct	Yds	TD	Int	Att	Yds	Avg	TD
1980	0	1	0.0	0	0	0	4	26	6.5	0
1981	47	91	51.6	619	9	4	76	263	3.5	3
1982	90	166	54.2	1,182	11	3	101	497	4.9	4
1983	94	170	55.3	1,516	14	4	109	531	4.9	11
Totals	231	428	54.0	3,317	34	11	290	1,317	4.5	18

=== Pro career ===
Gill, undrafted by the NFL, went on to sign a lucrative contract with the Canadian Football League's Montreal Concordes. In two seasons with the Concordes, Gill had 727 pass attempts with 411 completions for 4,928 yards and 23 touchdowns to 24 interceptions. He also had 826 rushing yards on 173 carries and seven touchdowns. Gill was just beginning to reach his potential as a professional player when he suffered three concussions, two of them coming in back-to-back games against the BC Lions and Saskatchewan Roughriders. Although he managed to keep the starting job until September, post-concussion issues prompted him to undergo a large battery of neurological tests during the 1985–86 offseason. On May 21, 1986—two days after the start of training camp—doctors informed the renamed Alouettes that Gill's post-concussion problems were serious enough that he would never be medically cleared to play football again, ending his career at the age of 23. At the time Gill had one year plus an option remaining on a three-year contract reportedly worth CAN$1.2 million.

=== Baseball ===
Turner decided to return to baseball. A standout shortstop, Gill had been drafted by the Chicago White Sox in the second round of the 1980 MLB draft at age 17 and again by the New York Yankees in the eighteenth round in 1983 at age 21. In college, he batted .284 in 48 games for Nebraska during the 1983 season. Gill was signed by the Cleveland Indians in May 1986 and spent three years in their organization (Gill played for the Class A Waterloo Indians in 1986 and the Class AA Williamsport Bills in 1987 and 1988) before deciding to quit professional sports as a player and return to football as a coach.

== Coaching career ==
=== Nebraska ===
In 1989, Gill began his coaching career at the University of Nebraska, his alma mater, serving one year as a graduate assistant coach. After spending a season each at the University of North Texas and Southern Methodist University, Gill returned once again to Nebraska, where he coached quarterbacks from 1992 to 2003 and wide receivers in 2004. Gill served as position coach for two first team All-Americans, Tommie Frazier and Eric Crouch, with Crouch also earning the Heisman Trophy under Gill's tutelage. The Cornhuskers earned three national championships in Gill's time as an assistant there.

=== Green Bay Packers ===
In 2005, Gill was hired by the Green Bay Packers as Director of Player Development to help players become acclimated to playing professional football in Green Bay and to direct players to resources concerning community involvement, continuing education, financial management, and retirement planning. He also served as an assistant wide receivers coach and an offensive assistant coach through December 2005.

=== Buffalo ===
Gill agreed to a five-year contract to become the 23rd head football coach at the University at Buffalo on December 16, 2005. The Buffalo Bulls had gone 8–49 under previous coach Jim Hofher, and was considered "one of the three or four worst FBS programs in the nation when [Gill] took over." Under Gill, the Bulls improved each of the first three seasons, winning the Mid-American Conference (MAC) championship in 2008.

==== 2006 ====
Turner Gill won two games in his first season with Buffalo compiling a 2–10 record. Despite its record Buffalo achieved some success. The team set a school record for most points in a season since moving to Division I, with 220. UB also scored the most points of any team in the MAC East Division and defeated an opponent (Kent State University) with a winning record for the first time since joining the MAC in 1999. Kent State had a 5–3 record at the time but ended the season 6–6.

==== 2007 ====
Gill's Buffalo team finished 5–7 overall with a 5–3 record in the MAC, the first winning conference record the squad had posted since joining the MAC in 1999. This was also the Bulls' first winning record at home since moving to Division I. The team finished third out of six schools in the MAC East Division but shared co-division champion honors. Gill was named MAC Coach of the Year for 2007.

Because of the great turnaround that Gill orchestrated in only his second season at Buffalo, he was one of two leading candidates to replace Bill Callahan as head coach of the Nebraska Cornhuskers. Bo Pelini was ultimately hired as the new Nebraska head coach.

==== 2008 ====
Gill's 2008 Buffalo team finished the regular season 7–5 and won the MAC's East Division. On December 5, Buffalo played #12 Ball State in the MAC Championship Game at Ford Field in Detroit. Ball State was heavily favored, as it entered the game with a perfect 12–0 mark, while Buffalo came in off a home loss to Kent State that had ended a five-game winning streak. Buffalo scored two touchdowns on fumble returns and won the game 42–24, however, giving the school its first MAC championship. Following the victory, Buffalo accepted a bid to play in the International Bowl in nearby Toronto, marking the school's first bowl game since joining the NCAA Division I Football Bowl Subdivision in 1999.

The season also saw Buffalo break its all-time scoring record, and numerous players broke school career and single-season records. Four of Buffalo's five losses came against teams that advanced to bowl games—Pittsburgh, Missouri, Central Michigan, and Western Michigan.

With Gill's success, he again became the focus of speculation about a move to a bigger program. Gill interviewed at Syracuse University, but was passed over for Doug Marrone, later the head coach for the NFL's Buffalo Bills. Gill also interviewed for the head coaching position at Auburn University, losing out to Iowa State head coach Gene Chizik, who had a 5–19 record in two seasons. On December 15, former National Basketball Association (NBA) star and Auburn player Charles Barkley, who had endorsed Gill for the position, criticized Auburn's decision, saying, "Race was the No. 1 factor. You can say it's not about race, but you can't compare the two résumés and say [Chizik] deserved the job. Out of all the coaches they interviewed, Chizik probably had the worst résumé."

The following day, December 16, Buffalo announced Gill had agreed to a contract extension and a raise, with his contract running through 2013 and making him one of the highest-paid coaches in the MAC.

==== 2009 ====
Buffalo went 5–7, ending Gill's track record of improving his team's win total each year.

=== Kansas ===
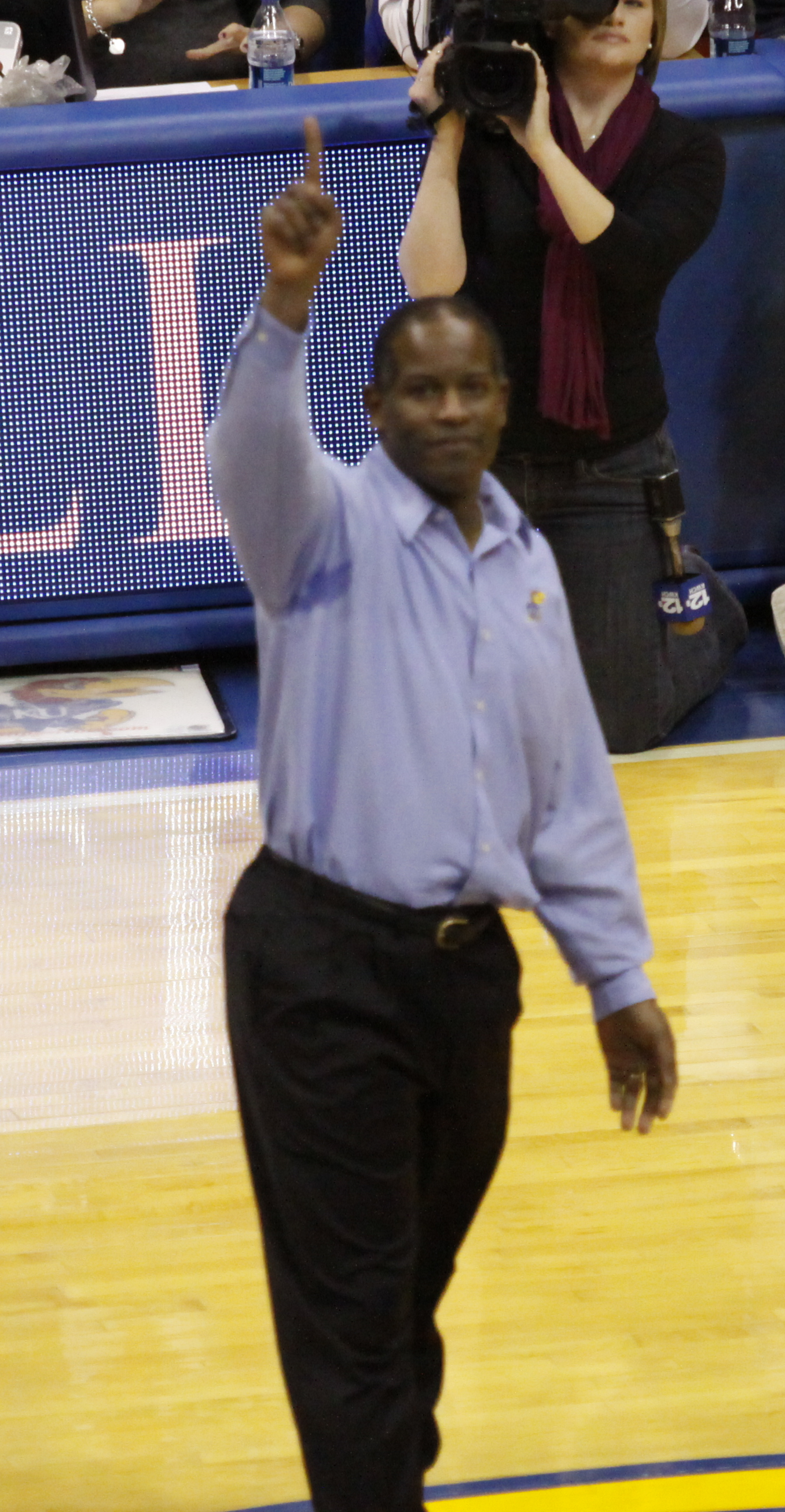
Gill at a Kansas basketball game in December 2009

On December 13, 2009, Gill was announced as the new head coach of the University of Kansas football team, replacing Mark Mangino, who resigned amid rumors and an investigation of questionable coaching practices. His daughter, Jordan Gill, was already a student at the University of Kansas, as well as an employee with the athletic department. It marked his return to the Big 12 Conference after leaving his assistant coaching post at Nebraska after the 2004 season. Gill was the first African American head football coach in KU history. Gill inherited a team that had lost its final 7 games under Mangino.

==== 2010 ====
On September 4, 2010, Gill lost his Kansas home debut to an FCS school (North Dakota State) 6–3. However, the Jayhawks bounced back the following week to upset #15 Georgia Tech 28–25. The upset was a high point in an otherwise difficult 3–9 season. The Jayhawks had one conference win in 2010, a 52–45 comeback win over Colorado after trailing 45–17 in the fourth quarter. It was the final meeting between the teams before Colorado exited the Big 12 for the Pac-12 Conference.

==== 2011 ====
The 2011 Jayhawks started the season at 2–0, but finished on a 10-game losing streak. This included lopsided losses to Georgia Tech (66–24), Oklahoma State (70–28), Oklahoma (47–17), Kansas State (59–21), Texas (43–0), and Texas A&M (61–7). Of 120 teams, the Jayhawks ranked 101st in passing yards, 95th in points scored, 120th in points allowed, 106th in total offense, and were outscored 525–238.

Then-KU athletics director Sheahon Zenger fired Gill after just two seasons with a 5–19 overall record.[56], a 1–16 record against the Big 12, and 4 wins against FBS opponents.

==== Termination ====
Upon his dismissal, Kansas owed coach Gill nearly $6 million, money that was due in just 120 days. The university drew upon donations from boosters to help pay off the contract.

=== Liberty ===
On December 15, 2011, Gill was announced as the new head coach at Liberty University as the replacement for departed head coach Danny Rocco.

Gill's first team at Liberty dropped their first four games before rebounding to finish 6–5. That was enough to claim a share of the Big South championship along with Stony Brook and Coastal Carolina. In 2013, his team finished with an 8–4 season overall and a share of the Big South with Coastal Carolina. The team improved in 2014, finishing 9–5 and making the second round of the FCS playoffs.

Gill's teams during 2015 through 2017 finished at 6–5 each season. The team finished atop the conference standings in 2016, its fourth conference title in five years. The 2017 team finished fourth in its final year of FCS play; the team did, however, upset highly favored FBS program Baylor University in its opening game at Waco.

In Liberty's first year as an FBS program in 2018, the team upset Old Dominion in the season opener at home, 52–10. The Flames would eventually finish 6–6 on the season. On December 3, Gill announced his retirement from coaching to spend more time with his wife Gayle, who was diagnosed with a heart condition in 2016.

== Head coaching record ==
Year	Team	Overall	Conference	Standing	Bowl/playoffs
Buffalo Bulls (Mid-American Conference) (2006–2009)
2006	Buffalo	2–10	1–7	6th (East)	
2007	Buffalo	5–7	5–3	T–1st (East)	
2008	Buffalo	8–6	5–3	1st (East)	L International
2009	Buffalo	5–7	3–5	5th (East)	
Buffalo:		20–30	14–18		
Kansas Jayhawks (Big 12 Conference) (2010–2011)
2010	Kansas	3–9	1–7	6th (North)	
2011	Kansas	2–10	0–9	10th	
Kansas:		5–19	1–16		
Liberty Flames (Big South Conference) (2012–2017)
2012	Liberty	6–5	5–1	T–1st	
2013	Liberty	8–4	4–1	T–1st	
2014	Liberty	9–5	4–1	T–1st	L NCAA Division I Second Round
2015	Liberty	6–5	3–3	T–3rd	
2016	Liberty	6–5	4–1	T–1st	
2017	Liberty	6–5	2–3	4th	
Liberty Flames (NCAA Division I FBS independent) (2018)
2018	Liberty	6–6			
Liberty:		47–35	22–10		
Total:		72–84			
National championship Conference title Conference division title or championship game berth
