= Mike Rozier =

American football player (born 1961)

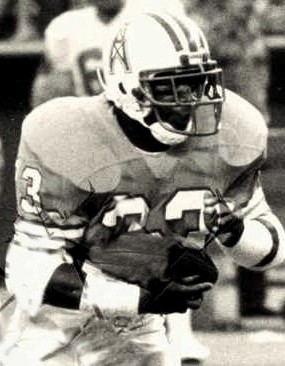
- Rozier with the Houston Oilers in 1987

No. 33, 30
- Position: Running back

Personal information
- Born: March 1, 1961 (age 65); Camden, New Jersey, U.S.
- Listed height: 5 ft 10 in (1.78 m)
- Listed weight: 209 lb (95 kg)

Career information
- High school: Woodrow Wilson (Camden)
- College: Coffeyville (1980); Nebraska (1981–1983)
- Supplemental draft: 1984: 1st round, 2nd overall pick

Career history
- Pittsburgh Maulers (1984); Jacksonville Bulls (1985); Houston Oilers (1985–1990); Atlanta Falcons (1990–1991)

Awards and highlights
- 2× Pro Bowl (1987, 1988); Heisman Trophy (1983); Unanimous All-American (1983); Consensus All-American (1982); 2× Big Eight Offensive Player of the Year (1982, 1983); 3× First-team All-Big Eight (1981–1983); Nebraska Cornhuskers Jersey No. 30 retired

Career NFL statistics
- Rushing yards: 4,462
- Rushing average: 3.8
- Rushing touchdowns: 30
- Receptions: 90
- Receiving yards: 715
- Receiving touchdowns: 1
- Stats at Pro Football Reference
- College Football Hall of Fame

Michael M. Rozier (born March 1, 1961) is an American former professional football player who was a running back in the United States Football League (USFL) for two seasons and the National Football League (NFL) for seven seasons from 1985 to 1991. He played college football for the Nebraska Cornhuskers, winning the Heisman Trophy in 1983. Afterward, he played for the Pittsburgh Maulers and the Jacksonville Bulls of the USFL, then played for the Houston Oilers and the Atlanta Falcons of the NFL. He was inducted into the College Football Hall of Fame in 2006.

== Early life ==
Rozier was born in Camden, New Jersey. He attended Woodrow Wilson High School in Camden, where he was a standout high school football player. Today, the football field bears his name.

== College career ==
Rozier went largely unnoticed by most of the major college programs. His recruitment to Nebraska was a complete accident. Former Nebraska head coach Frank Solich, at the time an assistant to head coach Tom Osborne, had been a keen observer of high school game films. While watching film of Pennsauken's game against nearby Woodrow Wilson High School, one player on the opposing team (Rozier) continually caught Solich's eye.

Rozier spent his freshman season at Coffeyville Junior College in Kansas, in order to get his grades up. In his one season with the Coffeyville Ravens, he led them to a 9–0 season in 1980, gaining 1,157 yards with a gaudy 7.4 yards-per-carry average, and scored ten touchdowns.

As a sophomore in 1981, Rozier first dazzled Husker fans with a 93-yard touchdown run against Kansas State. As the season progressed, Rozier began challenging Roger Craig for the starting position, a job he would eventually win in the fall of 1982 prior to his junior year. Rozier's progress was so pronounced that the talented and established Craig moved to fullback.

During his junior season, Rozier broke Bobby Reynolds's long-standing school record for rushing yards in a single season, with 1,689 yards, and led Nebraska to a second consecutive outright Big 8 title and a 12–1 record, losing only in controversial fashion to eventual national champion Penn State. In a performance against Missouri, Rozier came off the bench in the second half to rush for 139 yards on 17 carries to lead Nebraska to a comeback victory despite suffering from a painful hip-pointer injury. Rozier finished the 1982 season a consensus All-American and finished 10th in the Heisman voting.

As a senior, Nebraska's high-octane offense was often unstoppable, averaging 52 points and 401 rushing yards per game. Rozier had a nation's best 2,486 total yards with 2,148 of those coming on the ground and twenty-nine touchdowns scored. His 7.8 yards-per-carry mark on the season stands as the third-highest mark for players with more than 214 carries in a season. Against Kansas, Rozier rushed for 230 yards in the first half and finished with 285 rushing yards total, at that time a school record. Rozier went over 200 yards in each of his last four regular-season games of the 1983 season. His senior season was capped when he was awarded the Heisman Trophy, given to the best individual player in college football and was again an All-American.

His college career would end in disappointment, losing the 1984 Orange Bowl in which Miami defeated Nebraska 31–30 for the national championship. Rozier had 138 yards on 21 carries at halftime against a Miami Hurricanes team with the second-ranked defense in football, but he had to leave in the third quarter following an ankle injury. Rozier finished the game with 147 yards on 26 carries.

== Professional career ==
Rozier was selected by the Pittsburgh Maulers first overall in the 1984 USFL draft. He played his first two professional seasons in the United States Football League, in 1984, with the Pittsburgh Maulers, and 1985, with the Jacksonville Bulls. In 1985 Rozier played for the Jacksonville Bulls in the spring and the Houston Oilers in the fall.

He was selected by the Houston Oilers in the first round (second pick overall) of the 1984 NFL Supplemental Draft of USFL and CFL Players, joining them in the fall of 1985. Rozier played six seasons for the Oilers, amassing a total of 900 carries for 3,171 yards, including a 1,002-yard rushing season in 1988. While playing for the Oilers, Rozier was elected to the AFC Pro Bowl squad in both 1987 and 1988.

In 1990, Rozier only played three games for the Oilers, rushing 10 times for a total of 42 yards, before being released after they found no suitable trade partners. He was quickly picked up by the NFC's Atlanta Falcons, where he finished the year with 153 carries for 675 yards. His final season in the NFL came the next year with the Falcons. He completed the 1991 season with 361 yards on 96 carries, announcing his retirement during the off-season.

Rozier finished his career with a total of 1,159 carries for 4,462 yards, having averaged 3.8 yards per carry, and scoring 30 touchdowns.

As of the end of the 2020 season, Rozier is ranked 172nd on the NFL All-Time Rushing Yards list.

== Career statistics ==
=== USFL ===
Year	Team	GP	Rushing				Receiving			
Year	Team	GP	Att	Yds	Avg	TD	Rec	Yds	Avg	TD
1984	Pittsburgh Maulers	14	223	792	3.6	3	32	259	8.1	0
1985	Jacksonville Bulls	18	320	1,361	4.3	12	50	366	7.3	3
Total		32	543	2,153	4.0	15	82	625	7.6	3

=== NFL ===
Year	Team	GP	Rushing					Receiving				
Year	Team	GP	Att	Yds	Avg	Lng	TD	Rec	Yds	Avg	Lng	TD
1985	HOU	14	133	462	3.5	30	8	9	96	10.7	52	0
1986	HOU	13	199	662	3.3	19	4	24	180	7.5	23	0
1987	HOU	11	229	957	4.2	41	3	27	192	7.1	27	0
1988	HOU	15	251	1,002	4.0	28	10	11	99	9.0	18	1
1989	HOU	12	88	301	3.4	17	2	4	28	7.0	8	0
1990	HOU	3	10	42	4.2	11	0	5	46	9.2	24	0
1990	ATL	13	153	675	4.4	67	3	8	59	7.4	24	0
1991	ATL	11	96	361	3.8	19	0	2	15	7.5	20	0
Total		92	1,159	4,462	3.8	67	30	90	715	7.5	52	1

=== College ===
Season	Team	Rushing					Receiving				
Season	Team	Att	Yds	Avg	Lng	TD	Att	Yds	Avg	Lng	TD
1980	Attended Coffeyville Junior College										
1981	Nebraska	166	1,018	6.1	93	5	4	64	16.0	32	0
1982	Nebraska	268	1,807	6.7	62	15	6	46	7.7	14	2
1983	Nebraska	300	2,295	7.7	71	29	10	106	10.6	26	0
Career		734	5,120	6.9	93	49	20	216	10.8	32	2

== Awards and honors ==
NFL

- 2× Pro Bowl (1987, 1988)

College

- Heisman Trophy (1983)
- Maxwell Award (1983)
- Walter Camp Award (1983)
- Chic Harley Award (1983)
- SN Player of the Year (1983)
- UPI Player of the Year (1983)
- Unanimous All-American (1983)
- Consensus All-American (1982)
- 2× Big Eight Offensive Player of the Year (1982, 1983)
- 3× First-team All-Big Eight (1981–1983)
- Nebraska Cornhuskers Jersey No. 30 retired

== Personal life ==
Mike has been married to his wife Rochelle, an attorney, since 2005. They reside in the Sicklerville section of Winslow Township, New Jersey and together they have one son, Michael Guy Pacheco Rozier. He has two other children, Amber and JaMichael Rozier, who reside in Houston, Texas.

In 1996, he was shot in his hometown of Camden, New Jersey.

Rozier, along with his wife and three other family members, appeared on the October 22, 2013 episode of Family Feud as the anchor to his team.

Rozier was called one of the most stylish dressers in the history of the Heisman Trophy by SBNation.

On April 9, 2024, Rozier was honored in his hometown of Camden, New Jersey, with a street dedication. Additionally, a sign was erected in the city proclaiming it the home of the renowned former Nebraska, USFL, and NFL running back.

== See also ==
- List of NCAA Division I FBS players with at least 50 career rushing touchdowns
- List of NCAA major college football yearly rushing leaders
- List of NCAA major college football yearly scoring leaders
