= 1984 Orange Bowl =

- 50th Orange Bowl; National championship game (Note: Through luck and fortuitous scheduling, a "national championship game" was occasionally able to settle the matter on the field, as described in some contemporaneous reports. Despite the promotional billing, in several instances there were plausible scenarios for a third team to be selected as national champion by the major selectors, depending on outcomes of other games.) (Note: No. 2 Texas and No. 4 Illinois had lost earlier in the day. No. 3 Auburn won the Sugar Bowl played at the same time.)
- The Miami Orange Bowl in Miami, Florida, hosted the Orange Bowl.
Nebraska Cornhuskers	Miami Hurricanes
(12–0)	(10–1)
Big Eight	Independent
30	31
Head coach: Tom Osborne	Head coach: Howard Schnellenberger
AP / Coaches; 1 / 1	AP / Coaches; 5 / 4
	1	2	3	4	Total
Nebraska	0	14	3	13	30
Miami	17	0	14	0	31
- Date: January 2, 1984
- Season: 1983
- Stadium: Orange Bowl
- Location: Miami, Florida
- MVP: Bernie Kosar (Miami QB); Jack Fernandez (Miami LB)
- Favorite: Nebraska by 10 1/3 to 11 points
- Referee: Jimmy Harper (SEC)
- Attendance: 72,549

United States TV coverage
- Network: NBC
- Announcers: Don Criqui, John Brodie, and Bill Macatee
- Nielsen ratings: 23.5

The 1984 Orange Bowl was the 50th edition of the college football bowl game, played at the Orange Bowl in Miami, Florida, on Monday, January 2. Part of the 1983–84 bowl game season, it matched the undefeated and top-ranked Nebraska Cornhuskers of the Big Eight Conference and the No. 5 independent Miami Hurricanes. The game is famous for a coaching call by Nebraska's Tom Osborne after a touchdown late in the fourth quarter, where instead of playing for a tie with an extra point kick the Cornhuskers went for a two-point conversion to try to take the lead.

Despite being the designated away team in their home stadium, Miami, a heavy underdog, emerged victorious by a final count of 31–30. Thanks to results of bowls played earlier in the day, the victory enabled the Hurricanes to leapfrog Nebraska in the polls and become national champion for the first time in program history, including No. 3 Auburn, who won the Sugar Bowl played at the same time.

Howard Schnellenberger, who had helped build the Miami football program into a contender for national championships, resigned shortly after the game in order to pursue a head coaching opportunity in the United States Football League, which was looking to place a team in Miami; this never came to fruition.

== Teams ==
=== Nebraska ===
Nebraska entered the game ranked first in both major polls, with a 12–0 record, having steamrolled just about every opponent on the 1983 schedule, except for close road wins at Oklahoma State (14–10) and at Oklahoma (28–21). The Huskers were led by "Triplets" Heisman Trophy winning I-back Mike Rozier, future NFL #1 draft pick Irving Fryar at wingback and with All-American quarterback and Heisman finalist Turner Gill calling the signals, the Huskers of 1983 were a formidable outfit, averaging 52 points a game. They rolled up tallies of 84–13, 72–29, 69–19, 67–13 and 63–7 against Minnesota, Iowa State, Colorado, Kansas, and Syracuse, respectively. In the third quarter against Colorado, Nebraska managed to score seven touchdowns in 12 minutes.

They did have notable weaknesses, however. They had a fairly mediocre defense that was vulnerable to the pass, especially across the middle of the field, owing to the fact the Big Eight was dominated by run-oriented offenses, notably Oklahoma's wishbone. Nebraska also had a fairly average kicking game. Both of these weaknesses would haunt the Cornhuskers on the night.

Nebraska was appearing in their tenth Orange Bowl, and third consecutive.

=== Miami ===
Miami entered having been outscored 28–3 by Florida in their opening game. They won 10 games following their opening defeat, emerging as fifth in the AP poll, and fourth in the UPI poll. They were led by redshirt freshman quarterback Bernie Kosar, who had completed 61.5 percent of his passes for 2,328 yards and 15 touchdowns and had started all 11 games. Miami had a notably good defense, being ranked second in the nation in scoring defense (9.6 points per game) and in total defense (259.4 yards per game).

== Other bowls ==
The results of two earlier bowl games, as well as one taking place at the same time as the Orange Bowl, opened the door for Miami to claim the national championship if they won the game.

In the early afternoon the Cotton Bowl saw #2 and previously undefeated Texas fall 10–9 to #7 Georgia. Then, in the Rose Bowl, Illinois, ranked fifth in the coaches' poll and fourth by the Associated Press, was blown out 45–9 by unranked UCLA.

Simultaneously with the Orange Bowl, the #3 Auburn Tigers took to the field for the Sugar Bowl against #8 Michigan with a chance to claim the national championship if Nebraska faltered. However, Auburn struggled and failed to score a touchdown in an ugly 9–6 win. When the Sugar Bowl concluded, Miami was ahead of Nebraska in the third quarter; if their lead held, the Hurricanes had a legitimate chance of being voted national champions.

== Game summary ==
Nebraska came into the game as a 10 1/2-point favorite, and on their opening drive, the Huskers moved downfield rather easily. However, the Hurricanes got an early lift when they forced Nebraska to attempt a field-goal, which they then blocked. It was a huge early momentum swing and they capitalized very quickly. Kosar's two touchdown passes to Glenn Dennison along with a 45-yard Jeff Davis field goal gave Miami a 17–0 lead at the end of one quarter. Miami's second touchdown came after linebacker Jack Fernandez intercepted a pass from Gill at the Miami 35 and Kosar threw a pass to Eddie Brown for a touchdown, but the Kosar to Brown touchdown was erased after Stanley Shakespeare was caught for illegal blocking on a Nebraska defensive back and thus resulted in a 15-yard penalty at the spot of the foul, but it was good enough for a first down.

Nebraska didn't panic. Early in the second quarter, Osborne reached into his bag of tricks. First, in an attempt to confuse Kosar, he switched jerseys between defensive backs Dave Burke and Mike McCashland. As a result, Burke then played in the free safety position and McCashland played in the right cornerback position. Also, Burke, wearing McCashland's jersey, intercepted a pass from Kosar at the Nebraska 26. Then, on the 12th play for a 74-yard touchdown drive, he ran a trick play known as the fumblerooski. Facing a 3rd and 5 situation, Nebraska quarterback Gill intentionally "fumbled" the snap from center by effectively setting it on the turf, faking the ball to the fullback Mark Schellen, who, alongside Gill, Rozier and the tight end Monte Engebritson, ran right. The ball was picked up by All-American offensive guard and Outland Trophy/Lombardi Award winner Dean Steinkuhler, who ran left with the ball on a 19-yard touchdown run. While it is neither the first nor the last time this play has been run, it is arguably the most famous incidence of this play, which is now illegal. Before the game, Miami head coach Schnellenberger told his team that if Nebraska happened to run the fumblerooski that would show that the Huskers were desperate and that Miami would win. A touchdown run by Gill later in the period made the score 17–14 at halftime, on a 64-yard touchdown drive.

It was at this point that Miami fumbled at the 23-yard line of their own territory and Nebraska added three points to tie 17–17, beginning in the third quarter. With two long touchdown drives of 75 and 73 yardsNebraska took the score to 31–17, behind the passing of Kosar (who passed for exactly 300 yards on the night), and the running of backs Alonzo Highsmith and Albert Bentley, who each contributed rushing touchdowns to cap each drive. Rozier left the game with an injured ankle, after having rushed for 147 yards on 25 carries.

Nebraska had many opportunities to score without Rozier. Late in the third quarter, Gill ran to his left, initially keeping the ball and running into the grasp of a Miami defender before pitching the ball to backup I-back Jeff Smith, who came off the bench, ran for 40-yards before fumbling at the Miami 1-yard line, which Miami eventually recovered. Early in the 4th quarter, after Miami went three and out at their own end zone, Gill throws the ball to Scott Kimball at the end zone, but Rodney Bellinger broke up the pass. After Kevin Fagan sacked Gill at the Miami 31, Nebraska was forced to attempt a field goal, which they missed.

After Miami went three and out, Smith scored on a 1-yard run early in the fourth quarter on a 75-yard drive, which brought the margin back to 31–24. Then Nebraska caught a break, when Davis missed a 42-yard field goal attempt that would have made the margin 10 points in favor of the Hurricanes. Then Gill completed a long pass to Fryar which took the ball inside the Miami 35 with under 2 minutes to go, then an incomplete pass to Shane Swanson and he also completed a pass to Ricky Simmons down at the Miami 26. After Smith ran for two yards, the Huskers called for their last timeout. On 2nd and 8 from the Miami 24, Gill found a wide open Fryar all alone in the end zone and threw a perfect pass, which Fryar dropped. On third down and 8, Gill dropped the football after Fagan tackled him. Confused, Steinkuhler picked up the ball for a few yards, but the officials ruled it an incomplete pass. Thus, setting up a 4th down and 8 from the Miami 24-yard line with the clock running down inside a minute. Osborne called an option play, which Gill ran to his right, initially keeping the ball and running into the grasp of a Miami defender before pitching the ball at the last second to a streaking Smith, who sprinted in the rest of the way, making the score 31–30 Miami, with the extra point pending.

=== The decision ===
A successful kick would have tied the score at 31. Instead, Osborne went for the win, and with it, risked everything (the NCAA introduced overtime for Division I-A college football more than a decade later; so it would have ended in a tie). Miami's Kenny Calhoun broke up the conversion pass from quarterback Turner Gill to I-back Jeff Smith, leaving the inspired Hurricanes with a 31–30 upset victory over the top-ranked Cornhuskers.

"We were trying to win the game," Osborne said. "I don't think you go for a tie in that case. You try to win the game. We wanted an undefeated season and a clear-cut national championship." A tie would most likely have been enough to give the Huskers their third national championship with a 12–0–1 record, their first for Tom Osborne, since second-ranked Texas also lost earlier in the day to Georgia in the Cotton Bowl Classic and third-ranked Auburn had won unimpressively. Regardless of the tie, they still would have been ranked as one of the greatest college football teams of all time.

Coincidentally, Osborne had been asked earlier in the week by a reporter if he would ever consider going for two in just such a situation. "I hope it doesn't come up," Osborne said. "I'll be crucified one way or another on that one." When it did occur, Osborne had his mind made up. "I don't think any of our players would be satisfied backing into it with a PAT," Osborne said. "I don't think that's the way to do it."

=== Scoring ===
First quarter

- Miami – Glenn Dennison 2-yard pass from Bernie Kosar (Jeff Davis kick), 9:18
- Miami – Davis 45-yard field goal, 4:51
- Miami – Dennison 22-yard pass from Kosar (Davis kick), 1:08

Second quarter

- Nebraska – Dean Steinkuhler 19-yard run (Scott Livingston kick), 8:54
- Nebraska – Turner Gill 1-yard run (Livington kick), 2:17

Third quarter

- Nebraska – Livingston 34-yard field goal, 13:09
- Miami – Alonzo Highsmith 1-yard run (Davis kick), 9:37
- Miami – Albert Bentley 7-yard run (Davis kick), 4:44

Fourth quarter

- Nebraska – Jeff Smith 1-yard run (Livingston kick), 6:55
- Nebraska – Smith 24-yard run (Gill pass failed), 0:48

== Statistics ==
Statistics	Nebraska	Miami
First downs	24	22
Rushes–yards	56–287	28–130
Passing yards	172	300
Passes (C–A–I)	16–30–1	19–35–1
Total offense	86–459	63–430
Punts–average	3–37.3	4–41.8
Fumbles–lost	6–1	1–1
Turnovers	2	2
Penalties–yards	4–51	13–101
Time of possession	32:07	27:53

== Legacy ==
The game has widely been listed among the most memorable college football games by various sources, including ABC Sports Online's five "classic Orange Bowl moments". An ESPN survey once voted it as the greatest college football game ever played.

It was named by ABC Sports as the tenth Greatest Sports Moment of the 1980s.

The game almost overnight established the University of Miami as a football power, and it went on to win two more national championships before the end of the decade, under head coaches Jimmy Johnson and Dennis Erickson. The Hurricanes won a fourth with Erickson in 1991 by beating Nebraska in the Orange Bowl, which Miami shared with undefeated Washington, and beat Nebraska again for a fifth in 2001 under Larry Coker.

Nebraska head coach Osborne eventually won three national championships of his own (he defeated Miami in the 1995 Orange Bowl for his first), and retired after the 1997 season as one of the winningest coaches in college football history. But it was his decision to go for the win, rather than the tie, and his willingness to risk the national championship on one play which has come to define his legacy more than any single achievement, and has become a textbook case in game theory. A simple extra point conversion would have tied the game and arguably given Nebraska the national championship. Economists Avinash Dixit and Barry Nalebuff argue that Osborne would have had more options had he gone for two earlier in the fourth quarter: "Tom Osborne would have done better to first try the two-point attempt (at the score of 31–23), and then if it succeeded go for the one-point, while if it failed attempt a second two-pointer."

(Texas coach Darrell Royal faced a similar situation as Osborne during the No. 1 Longhorns' 1969 matchup vs. No. 2 Arkansas. Trailing 14-0 through three quarters, Royal opted for the 2-point conversion after James Street's 42-yard touchdown run on the first play of the final period. Street successfully converted to cut the Razorbacks' lead to six. With 3:58 remaining, Jim Bertlesen's 2-yard touchdown and Happy Feller's extra point gave Texas a 15-14 victory and the national championship.)

The game was placed in NCAA Football video games as a "College Classic," challenging players to recreate the ending. The scenario begins with Nebraska with the ball, with the decision to either go for the tie or the win entirely up to the player. Due to the game using modern rules when it was developed, it is entirely possible to take the game into overtime.
