= 1983 Nebraska Cornhuskers football team =

American college football season

1983 Nebraska Cornhuskers football

Big 8 champion

Orange Bowl, L 30–31 vs. Miami (FL)
- Conference: Big Eight Conference

Ranking
- Coaches: No. 2
- AP: No. 2
- Record: 12–1 (7–0 Big 8)
- Head coach: Tom Osborne (11th season)
- Offensive scheme: I formation
- Defensive coordinator: Charlie McBride (3rd season)
- Base defense: 5–2
- Home stadium: Memorial Stadium

1983 Big Eight Conference football standings
| | Conf. | | | | | Overall |
| Team | W | | L | | T | W | | L | | T |
|---|---|---|---|---|---|---|---|---|---|---|
| No. 2 Nebraska $ | 7 | – | 0 | – | 0 | 12 | – | 1 | – | 0 |
| Missouri | 5 | – | 2 | – | 0 | 7 | – | 5 | – | 0 |
| Oklahoma | 5 | – | 2 | – | 0 | 8 | – | 4 | – | 0 |
| Oklahoma State | 3 | – | 4 | – | 0 | 8 | – | 4 | – | 0 |
| Iowa State | 3 | – | 4 | – | 0 | 4 | – | 7 | – | 0 |
| Kansas | 2 | – | 5 | – | 0 | 4 | – | 6 | – | 1 |
| Colorado | 2 | – | 5 | – | 0 | 4 | – | 7 | – | 0 |
| Kansas State | 1 | – | 6 | – | 0 | 3 | – | 8 | – | 0 |
$ – Conference champion; Rankings from AP Poll

The 1983 Nebraska Cornhuskers football team represented the University of Nebraska–Lincoln in the 1983 NCAA Division I-A football season. The team was coached by Tom Osborne and played their home games in Memorial Stadium in Lincoln, Nebraska. Nicknamed "The Scoring Explosion", the team was noted for its prolific offense, which is still widely considered one of the greatest in college football history. The team and some of its individual players set several NCAA statistical records, some of which still stand. Nebraska scored a total of 654 points on the season.

== Schedule ==
| Date | Time | Opponent | Rank | Site | TV | Result | Attendance | Source |
|---|---|---|---|---|---|---|---|---|
| August 29 | 8:00 pm | vs. No. 4 Penn State* | No. 1 | Giants Stadium; East Rutherford, NJ (Kickoff Classic) | KATZ | W 44–6 | 71,123 | |
| September 10 | 1:30 pm | Wyoming* | No. 1 | Memorial Stadium; Lincoln, NE | | W 56–20 | 76,016 | |
| September 17 | 7:05 pm | at Minnesota* | No. 1 | Hubert H. Humphrey Metrodome; Minneapolis, MN (rivalry) | KETV | W 84–13 | 62,687 | |
| September 24 | 1:30 pm | UCLA* | No. 1 | Memorial Stadium; Lincoln, NE | ESPN | W 42–10 | 76,510 | |
| October 1 | 1:30 pm | Syracuse* | No. 1 | Memorial Stadium; Lincoln, NE | | W 63–7 | 76,382 | |
| October 8 | 1:30 pm | at Oklahoma State | No. 1 | Lewis Field; Stillwater, OK | KWTV | W 14–10 | 49,600 | |
| October 15 | 2:50 pm | at Missouri | No. 1 | Faurot Field; Columbia, MO (rivalry) | ABC | W 34–13 | 72,348 | |
| October 22 | 1:30 pm | Colorado^{†} | No. 1 | Memorial Stadium; Lincoln, NE (rivalry) | | W 69–19 | 76,268 | |
| October 29 | 1:30 pm | at Kansas State | No. 1 | KSU Stadium; Manhattan, KS (rivalry) | | W 51–25 | 44,150 | |
| November 5 | 1:30 pm | Iowa State | No. 1 | Memorial Stadium; Lincoln, NE (rivalry) | | W 72–29 | 76,326 | |
| November 12 | 2:50 pm | Kansas | No. 1 | Memorial Stadium; Lincoln, NE (rivalry) | ABC | W 67–13 | 76,503 | |
| November 26 | 2:50 pm | at Oklahoma | No. 1 | Oklahoma Memorial Stadium; Norman, OK (rivalry) | CBS | W 28–21 | 75,008 | |
| January 2, 1984 | 7:00 pm | at No. 5 Miami (FL)* | No. 1 | Miami Orange Bowl; Miami, FL (Orange Bowl, rivalry) | NBC | L 30–31 | 72,529 | |
*Non-conference game; ^{†}Homecoming; Rankings from AP Poll released prior to the game; All times are in Central time

== Roster ==
| Armsng, Rob #49 (So.) LB; Baulisch, Tom (So.) DE; Behning, Mark #73 (Jr.) OT; Biggers, Kevin #13 (Jr.) MON; Blankenship, Brian #70 (So.) OG; Borer, Pat #41 (So.) FB; Bourn, Don #92 (Jr.) TE; Bourne, David (So.) DE; Bowen, Bob (So.) TE; Brungardt, Mike (So.) DE; Brungardt, Tim #32 (Sr.) FB; Bunger, Jon #97 (So.) DE; Burke, Dave #33 (Jr.) CB; Carl, Mike (So.) CB; Carlson, Dan (So.) OG; Cartwright, Charlie #31 (So.) CB; Casterline, Dan #24 (So.) MON; Clark, Bret #10 (Jr.) S Cooper, Mark (So.) C Daffer, Chad #46 (So.) LB; Daum, Mark #51 (Jr.) LB; Demmel, Tom (So.) P Dietz, Dave #98 (So.) TE; Dittmer, Jim #59 (Jr.) OG; Divis, Greg #45 (So.) IB; DuBose, Doug #22 (So.) IB; Engebritson, Monte #83 (Sr.) TE; Fisher, Todd #6 (So.) CB; Frain, Todd #80 (So.) TE; Fryar, Irving #27 (Sr.) WB; Gatson, Pernell (So.) WB; Gill, Turner #12 (Sr.) QB; Graeber, Ken #52 (Jr.) MG; Greene, Ricky #5 (Jr.) CB; Grimminger, Harry #58 (Jr.) OG; Hagerman, Mark #9 (Sr.) PK; Harris, Neil #11 (Jr.) CB; Herrmann, Doug #63 (Sr.) DT; Hiemer, Brian #94 (Jr.) TE | Hoefler, Mike (So.) C Holloway, Tony #43 (So.) DE; Jeffries, Jack (So.) TE; Kaelin, Ken (So.) FB; Keeler, Mike #61 (Sr.) DT; Kimball, Scott #88 (Jr.) SE; Klein, Dale (So.) PK; Knox, Mike #44 (Jr.) LB; Kreikemeier, Keith (So.) OG; Lambert, Andre (So.) SE; Lewis, Bill #68 (So.) C Lindstrom, Roger #23 (So.) WB; Livingston, Scott #48 (Jr.) P/PK; Maggard, Rob (So.) OT; Marfisi, Gerald #35 (So.) MON; Mason, Nate #8 (Sr.) QB; McCashland, Mike #2 (Jr.) MON; McCormick, Kevin #69 (So.) OG; McCoy, Dan #40 (So.) LB; Miles, Paul #21 (So.) IB; Mlinar, Jerry (So.) QB; Morrow, Tom #77 (So.) OT; Muehling, Brad #54 (Sr.) C Mullins, Marty (So.) SE; Napodano, Joe #3 (So.) S Nelson, Ray (So.) IB; Noel, Jack (So.) C Orton, Greg #67 (Jr.) OG; Paige, Woody #9 (So.) CB; Parker, Stan #74 (Fr.) OT; Parsons, Kevin #35 (Fr.) LB; Pokorny, Brian #18 (So.) CB; Porter, Scott #36 (Jr.) FB; Praeuner, Wade #85 (Sr.) MON; Proffitt, Todd #34 (So.) LB; Raridon, Scott #72 (Sr.) OT; Rathman, Tom #26 (So.) FB; Reeves, Gregg #93 (So.) DE; Reinhardt, John #62 (Sr.) MG | Reynolds, Rod #95 (So.) DT; Ridder, Dave #86 (Sr.) DE; Roth, Tim #65 (So.) OT; Rozier, Guy #4 (So.) MON; Rozier, Mike #30 (Sr.) IB; Schellen, Mark #25 (Sr.) FB; Schneider, Dave #1 (So.) PK; Schneider, Gary (So.) CB; Schnitzler, Robb (So.) WB; Schoettger, Scott #42 (Jr.) SE; Shead, Ken #99 (So.) MG; Sherlock, John #66 (Sr.) OT; Siebler, Bryan #19 (So.) CB; Simmons, Ricky #7 (Sr.) SE; Skow, Jim #96 (So.) DT; Smith, Brad #81 (So.) DE; Smith, Jeff #28 (Jr.) IB; Spachman, Chris #76 (Fr.) DT; Stacy, Dave #16 (So.) CB; Steinkuhler, Dean #71 (Sr.) OG; Strasburger, Matt (So.) S Strasburger, Scott #90 (Jr.) DE; Stuckey, Rob #75 (Jr.) DT; Sundberg, Craig #15 (Jr.) QB; Swanson, Shane #17 (Jr.) WB; Thayer, Dan #29 (So.) S Thomas, Anthony #53 (Jr.) OG; Thompson, Jim #39 (Jr.) WB; Tramner, Mike #64 (Sr.) MG; Traynowicz, Mark #57 (Jr.) C Tucker, Scott #89 (So.) DE; Turner, Travis #14 (So.) QB; Wade, Stanley #55 (So.) LB; Weber, Bill #87 (Jr.) DE; White, John (So.) LB; Wingard, Dan #47 (So.) P Yates, Rod #91 (Jr.) SE; Zierke, Mike #78 (Jr.) DT |

=== Depth chart ===
Defense

FS
Bret Clark
Gary Schneider
Shane Thorell

| INSDIE | INSDIE |
|---|---|
| Mike Knox | Mark Daum |
| Chad Daffer | Todd Proffitt |
| Tony Holloway | Dan McCoy |

MONSTER BACK
Mike Mccashland
Dan Casterline
Guy Rozier

CB
Neil Harris
Todd Fisher
Brian Pokorny

| DE | DT | NT | DT | DE |
|---|---|---|---|---|
| Scott Strasburger | Rob Stuckey | Mike Tramner | Mike Keeler | Bill Weber |
| Wade Praeuner | Jim Skow | Ken Graeber | Doug Herrman | Dave Ridder |
| Brad Smith | Chris Spachman | Ken Shead | Mike Zierke | Scott Tucker |

CB
Dave Burke
Ricky Greene
Bryan Siebler

Offense

SE
Ricky Simmons
Scott Kimball
Scott Schoettger

| LT | LG | C | RG | RT |
|---|---|---|---|---|
| Mark Behning | Harry Grimminger | Mark Traynowicz | Dean Steinkuhler | Scott Raridon |
| John Sherlock | Greg Orton | Brad Muehling | Brian Blankenship | Tim Roth |
| Rob Maggard | Anthony Thomas | Jack Noel | Kevin McCormick | Tom Morrow |

TE
Monte Engelbriston
Brian Hiemre
Todd Frain
Don Bourn

WB
Irving Fryar
Shane Swanson
Jim Thompson

QB
Turner Gill
Craig Sundberg
Nate Mason

RB
Mike Rozier
Jeff Smith
Paul Miles

FB
Mark Schellen
Tom Rathman
Tim Brungardt

Special teams
PK Dave Schneider
P Scott Livingston

== Coaching staff ==
| Name | Title | First year in this position | Years at Nebraska | Alma mater |
|---|---|---|---|---|
| Tom Osborne | Head Coach; Offensive coordinator | 1973 | 1964–1997 | Hastings College |
| Charlie McBride | Defensive Coordinator | 1981 | 1977–1999 | Colorado |
| Cletus Fischer | Offensive Line | | 1960–1985 | Nebraska |
| John Melton | Linebackers | 1973 | 1962–1988 | Wyoming |
| Boyd Epley | Head Strength Coach | 1969 | 1969–2003 | Nebraska |
| George Darlington | Defensive Ends | | 1973–2002 | Rutgers |
| Milt Tenopir | Offensive Line | 1974 | 1974–2002 | Sterling |
| Gene Huey | Receivers | 1977 | 1977–1986 | Wyoming |
| Frank Solich | Running Backs | 1983 | 1979–2003 | Nebraska |
| Jack Pierce | | | 1979–1991 | |
| Bob Thornton | Secondary | 1981 | 1981–1985 | Nebraska |
| Dan Young | Offensive Line; Kicking | 1983 | 1983–2002 | Reed College |

== Game summaries ==
=== Penn State ===
#4 Penn State vs #1 Nebraska [box score]

| Team | 1 | 2 | 3 | 4 | Total |
|---|---|---|---|---|---|
| #4 Penn State | 0 | 0 | 0 | 6 | 6 |
| • #1 Nebraska | 14 | 7 | 9 | 14 | 44 |

- Date: 1983-08-29
- Location: Giants Stadium, East Rutherford, New Jersey
- Game start: 8:00 p.m. EST
- Game attendance: 71,123
- TV announcers (Katz): Curt Gowdy and Lee Corso

Nebraska overcame nine fumbles (one lost) to avenge their only loss from the previous year, destroying the defending national championship Penn State team 44–6 in the first ever Kickoff Classic. The Nittany Lions narrowly avoided their first shutout since 1972 when they scored a touchdown against Nebraska reserves with 20 seconds left to play. The margin of defeat tied the worst loss ever by a Joe Paterno Penn State team to date.

=== Wyoming ===
Wyoming at #1 Nebraska [box score]

| Team | 1 | 2 | 3 | 4 | Total |
|---|---|---|---|---|---|
| Wyoming | 0 | 3 | 7 | 10 | 20 |
| • #1 Nebraska | 21 | 21 | 14 | 0 | 56 |

- Date: 1983-09-10
- Location: Memorial Stadium, Lincoln, Nebraska
- Game attendance: 76,016

It was a record-setting day as Nebraska IB Mike Rozier became Nebraska's all-time rushing leader, breaking the previous record set by IB I. M. Hipp four years prior, while Nebraska QB Turner Gill extended his interception-free pass completions streak to a record 99, surpassing QB Jerry Tagge's record of 88 set in 1969. Nebraska rolled despite Wyoming owning over 37 minutes of the time of possession.

=== Minnesota ===
#1 Nebraska at Minnesota [box score]

| Team | 1 | 2 | 3 | 4 | Total |
|---|---|---|---|---|---|
| • #1 Nebraska | 21 | 21 | 21 | 21 | 84 |
| Minnesota | 0 | 10 | 3 | 0 | 13 |

- Date: 1983-09-17
- Location: Hubert H. Humphrey Metrodome, Minneapolis
- Game start: 7:00 p.m. CST
- Game attendance: 62,687
- Referee: Vance Carlson

Another record outing for the Cornhuskers on the road in Minneapolis, as the Minnesota Golden Gophers were absolutely smashed in their worst-ever defeat, as Nebraska scored their most points since a 100–0 smearing of Nebraska Wesleyan in 1917, and their most points ever against a Division I-A team. Irving Fryar set a new wingback reception record of 138 yards on two catches, both tosses the longest of his and QB Turner Gill's careers, and the entire 60-man Cornhusker travel squad had obtained playing time before the start of the 4th quarter.

=== UCLA ===
UCLA at #1 Nebraska [box score]

| Team | 1 | 2 | 3 | 4 | Total |
|---|---|---|---|---|---|
| UCLA | 7 | 3 | 0 | 0 | 10 |
| • #1 Nebraska | 0 | 14 | 14 | 14 | 42 |

- Date: 1983-09-24
- Location: Memorial Stadium, Lincoln, Nebraska
- Game attendance: 76,510

UCLA put a brief fear into Nebraska in Lincoln, coming in with no wins and jumping out to a 10–0 lead. UCLA QB Rick Neuheisel was sacked in the 2nd half, forcing a fumble which Nebraska recovered, and the momentum then stayed with the Cornhuskers as UCLA was shut down while Nebraska rolled off 42 straight points. This victory was the 100th of Coach Osborne's career. The game was also notable for one of the most famous plays in Nebraska history, a 2-yard touchdown run in which Rozier started left, reversed his field, ran backward to about the 17-yard line while sweeping to the right, and then avoided several more defenders before entering the end zone.

=== Syracuse ===
Syracuse at #1 Nebraska [box score]

| Team | 1 | 2 | 3 | 4 | Total |
|---|---|---|---|---|---|
| Syracuse | 0 | 0 | 0 | 7 | 7 |
| • #1 Nebraska | 14 | 21 | 21 | 7 | 63 |

- Date: 1983-10-01
- Location: Memorial Stadium, Lincoln, Nebraska
- Game attendance: 76,382

Nebraska QB Turner Gill was 17 interception-free pass completions from the Big 8 all-time record when his streak of 125 was broken by Syracuse S Rob Hobby. No other setbacks could stand in the way of a relatively easy 63–7 Cornhusker domination of the Orangemen.

=== Oklahoma State ===
#1 Nebraska at #20 Oklahoma State [box score]

| Team | 1 | 2 | 3 | 4 | Total |
|---|---|---|---|---|---|
| • #1 Nebraska | 0 | 7 | 7 | 0 | 14 |
| #20 Oklahoma State | 0 | 10 | 0 | 0 | 10 |

- Date: 1983-10-08
- Location: Lewis Field, Stillwater, Oklahoma
- Game attendance: 49,600

Nebraska was struggling to pull away from Oklahoma State, holding on to a tenuous 4-point lead, and watched three drives into Cowboy territory come up empty due to turnovers. Nebraska S Bret Clark made an end zone interception on the last play of the game to preserve the Cornhusker victory, and Nebraska left Stillwater and the scare behind them as Oklahoma State's decades-long futility against Nebraska continued.

=== Missouri ===
#1 Nebraska at Missouri [box score]

| Team | 1 | 2 | 3 | 4 | Total |
|---|---|---|---|---|---|
| • #1 Nebraska | 6 | 14 | 0 | 14 | 34 |
| Missouri | 7 | 6 | 0 | 0 | 13 |

- Date: 1983-10-15
- Location: Faurot Field, Columbia, Missouri
- Game start: 2:50 p.m. CDT
- Game attendance: 72,348
- TV announcers (ABC): Keith Jackson and Frank Broyles

Emboldened by the near-success of Oklahoma State the week prior, Missouri was firing on all cylinders and twice held the lead, trailed Nebraska by just a touchdown at halftime, and prevented Nebraska from pulling away through to the beginning of the 4th quarter. The Blackshirts held strong to prevent any 2nd half scoring by the Tigers, who themselves contributed to the effort by offering up a key fumble turnover, and the Cornhuskers came out of Columbia with the win.

=== Colorado ===
Colorado at #1 Nebraska [box score]

| Team | 1 | 2 | 3 | 4 | Total |
|---|---|---|---|---|---|
| Colorado | 3 | 9 | 7 | 0 | 19 |
| • #1 Nebraska | 7 | 7 | 48 | 7 | 69 |

- Date: 1983-10-22
- Location: Memorial Stadium, Lincoln, Nebraska
- Game attendance: 76,268

Colorado's game plan allowed them to keep up with Nebraska for the 1st half, but halftime adjustments resulted in the Cornhuskers exploding for a Big 8 record 48 points in the 3rd quarter alone, which was also just 1 point short of the NCAA record for points in a quarter. Buffalo CB Victor Scott later stated "It was like someone dropped the atom bomb on us", in regards to the three touchdowns Nebraska put up in the first 2:24 of the 2nd half. During one stretch of the third quarter, the Huskers set an NCAA record by scoring 41 points in 2:41 time of possession.

=== Kansas State ===
#1 Nebraska at Kansas State [box score]

| Team | 1 | 2 | 3 | 4 | Total |
|---|---|---|---|---|---|
| • #1 Nebraska | 21 | 17 | 0 | 13 | 51 |
| Kansas State | 2 | 3 | 0 | 20 | 25 |

- Date: 1983-10-29
- Location: KSU Stadium, Manhattan, Kansas
- Game attendance: 44,150

This game was closer than the score suggests. Despite trailing 38–5 at the beginning of the 4th quarter, Kansas State scored on the next play, recovered an onside kick and promptly scored again, and then recovered a Nebraska fumble and were marching again, trailing 25–38 with 8:57 to play. Although the Cornhuskers were outscored 13–20 in the 4th quarter, their two touchdowns were more than enough to preserve the win, as Nebraska IB Mike Rozier moved into 2nd place on the Big 8 career rushing chart.

=== Iowa State ===
Iowa State at #1 Nebraska [box score]

| Team | 1 | 2 | 3 | 4 | Total |
|---|---|---|---|---|---|
| Iowa State | 0 | 14 | 7 | 8 | 29 |
| • #1 Nebraska | 14 | 21 | 10 | 27 | 72 |

- Date: 1983-11-05
- Location: Memorial Stadium, Lincoln, Nebraska
- Game attendance: 76,326

Nebraska IB Mike Rozier set a new Big 8 season touchdown record of 24, supplanting the mark set by Oklahoma's Heisman-winning RB Steve Owens, and also set a new Nebraska career touchdown record of 47, unseating Johnny Rodgers – also a Heisman winner – from his 1972 record. Unsurprisingly at this point, Rozier would go on to win his own Heisman at the end of this season. Nebraska's 72 points were the highest ever scored against a Big 8 team, the most ever scored against any team at Memorial Stadium, and the combined 101 points also the most scored in any game at Memorial Stadium.

=== Kansas ===
Kansas at #1 Nebraska [box score]

| Team | 1 | 2 | 3 | 4 | Total |
|---|---|---|---|---|---|
| Kansas | 0 | 0 | 7 | 6 | 13 |
| • #1 Nebraska | 14 | 27 | 6 | 20 | 67 |

- Date: 1983-11-12
- Location: Memorial Stadium, Lincoln, Nebraska
- Game start: 2:50 p.m. CST
- Game attendance: 76,503
- TV announcers (ABC): Al Michaels and Lee Grosscup

Nebraska IB Mike Rozier again made history for the second week in a row, increasing his season touchdown record to 28, breaking the NCAA record of 26 held by Lydell Mitchell of Penn State since 1971. In addition, Rozier set new Big 8 and Nebraska records for single season rushing yards, also knocking off the single-season 2,011 all-purpose yardage record set by Nebraska's Johnny Rodgers in 1972, by rolling up a total of 2,219. Rozier set a Nebraska record by rushing for 285 yards, including 230 in the first half (the school individual record for rushing yards in a game was broken by Calvin Jones, who rushed for 294 yards against Kansas in 1991).

=== Oklahoma ===
#1 Nebraska at Oklahoma [box score]

| Team | 1 | 2 | 3 | 4 | Total |
|---|---|---|---|---|---|
| • #1 Nebraska | 7 | 7 | 14 | 0 | 28 |
| Oklahoma | 0 | 14 | 7 | 0 | 21 |

- Date: 1983-11-26
- Location: Oklahoma Memorial Stadium, Norman, Oklahoma
- Game start: 2:30 p.m. CST
- Game attendance: 75,008
- Referee: John McClintock
- TV announcers (CBS): Gary Bender and Pat Haden

After the Cornhuskers came from behind twice, the Blackshirts made an epic stand at the end of the game, taking advantage of a motion penalty that moved Oklahoma back from Nebraska's 1-yard line before sacking Sooner QB Danny Bradley and then knocking down two of his subsequent pass attempts with just 32 seconds left to play, which preserved the Cornhusker 7-point lead, the victory, and gave Nebraska its third straight Big 8 Title.

=== Miami ===
#5 Miami vs #1 Nebraska [box score]

| Team | 1 | 2 | 3 | 4 | Total |
|---|---|---|---|---|---|
| • #5 Miami | 17 | 0 | 14 | 0 | 31 |
| #1 Nebraska | 0 | 14 | 3 | 13 | 30 |

- Date: 1984-01-02
- Location: Miami Orange Bowl, Miami
- Game start: 8:05 p.m. EST
- Game attendance: 72,529
- Referee: Jimmy Harper
- TV announcers (NBC): Don Criqui and John Brodie

Nebraska Head Coach Tom Osborne decided to forgo an almost-certain national title from settling for a tie game, and went for a 2-point conversion in the final minute in order to get the win. The attempt failed, Miami won the National Championship, and Coach Osborne's decision was forever embedded in Nebraska lore. The other was the fumblerooski, which resulted a touchdown score by Dean Steinkuhler in the 2nd quarter. The Cornhuskers had battled back from a 17–31 deficit at the start of the fourth quarter without Heisman winning HB Mike Rozier who left due to injury. And despite the loss, Coach Osborne's was selected National Coach of the Year, and his decision came to define his career and the Nebraska program as championship-caliber competitors for years to come.

== Rankings ==
Ranking movements Legend: ██ Increase in ranking ██ Decrease in ranking
| | Week | | | | | | | | | | | | | | | |
| Poll | Pre | 1 | 2 | 3 | 4 | 5 | 6 | 7 | 8 | 9 | 10 | 11 | 12 | 13 | 14 | Final |
|---|---|---|---|---|---|---|---|---|---|---|---|---|---|---|---|---|
| AP | 1 | 1 | 1 | 1 | 1 | 1 | 1 | 1 | 1 | 1 | 1 | 1 | 1 | 1 | 1 | 2 |
| Coaches | | | | | | | | | | | | | | | | 2 |

== After the season ==
Nebraska's high-octane offense was often unstoppable, averaging 52 points and over 400 rushing yards per game. Mike Rozier finished with a national best 2,486 total yards with 2,148 of those coming on the ground and twenty-nine touchdowns scored. Against Kansas, Rozier rushed for a staggering 230 yards in the first half and finished with 285 rushing yards total, at that time a school record. Rozier went over 200 yards in each of his last four regular season games of the 1983 season. His magical senior season was capped when he was awarded the Heisman Trophy, given to the best individual player in college football.

During his senior season, Turner Gill called the signals for one of the most prolific offenses in college football history. Gill finished fourth in the voting for the 1983 Heisman Trophy which was won by teammate Mike Rozier. The Huskers came within a whisker of a national championship, falling just one point short following a failed two-point conversion attempt in the 1984 Orange Bowl.

Overall, Gill finished with a 28–2 record in his three years as a starter, winning three consecutive outright Big Eight championships with a perfect 20–0 mark in conference play. Despite this, he was unable to lead the Huskers to a national title, falling agonizingly short in each of his three seasons.

=== Awards ===
| Award | Name(s) |
|---|---|
| Heisman Trophy | Mike Rozier |
| Maxwell Award | Mike Rozier |
| Outland Trophy | Dean Steinkuhler |
| Lombardi Award | Dean Steinkuhler |
| National Coach of the Year | Tom Osborne |
| National Player of the Year | Mike Rozier |
| National Defensive Lineman of the Year | Dean Steinkuhler |
| Big 8 Player of the Year | Mike Rozier |
| All-America 1st team | Mike Rozier, Irving Fryar, Dean Steinkuhler |
| All-America 2nd team | Turner Gill |
| All-America 3rd team | Scott Raridon |
| All-America honorable mention | Bret Clark, Mike Knox |
| All-Big 8 1st team | Irving Fryar, Turner Gill, Scott Raridon, Mike Rozier, Dean Steinkuhler, Mark Traynowicz |
| All-Big 8 2nd team | Rob Stuckey |

=== NFL and pro players ===
The following Nebraska players who participated in the 1983 season later moved on to the next level and joined a professional or semi-pro team as draftees or free agents.

| Name | Team |
|---|---|
| Mark Behning | Pittsburgh Steelers |
| Bret Clark | Tampa Bay Bandits |
| Doug DuBose | San Francisco 49ers |
| Todd Frain | Washington Redskins |
| Irving Fryar | New England Patriots |
| Turner Gill | Montreal Concordes |
| Mike Knox | Denver Broncos |
| Bill Lewis | Los Angeles Raiders |
| Scott Livingston | Dallas Cowboys |
| Paul Miles | Tampa Bay Buccaneers |
| Greg Orton | Detroit Lions |
| Tom Rathman | San Francisco 49ers |
| Mike Rozier | Pittsburgh Maulers |
| Mark Schellen | New Orleans Breakers |
| Ricky Simmons | Washington Federals |
| Jim Skow | Cincinnati Bengals |
| Jeff Smith | Kansas City Chiefs |
| Dean Steinkuhler | Houston Oilers |
| Shane Swanson | Denver Broncos |
| Mark Traynowicz | Buffalo Bills |
