= 1983 Oklahoma Sooners football team =

American college football season

1983 Oklahoma Sooners football
- Conference: Big Eight Conference
- Record: 8–4 (5–2 Big 8)
- Head coach: Barry Switzer (11th season)
- Offensive coordinator: Galen Hall (11th season)
- Offensive scheme: Wishbone
- Defensive coordinator: Gary Gibbs (3rd season)
- Base defense: 5–2
- Captains: Danny Bradley; Rick Bryan; Scott Case; Paul Parker
- Home stadium: Oklahoma Memorial Stadium

1983 Big Eight Conference football standings
| | Conf. | | | | | Overall |
| Team | W | | L | | T | W | | L | | T |
|---|---|---|---|---|---|---|---|---|---|---|
| No. 2 Nebraska $ | 7 | – | 0 | – | 0 | 12 | – | 1 | – | 0 |
| Missouri | 5 | – | 2 | – | 0 | 7 | – | 5 | – | 0 |
| Oklahoma | 5 | – | 2 | – | 0 | 8 | – | 4 | – | 0 |
| Oklahoma State | 3 | – | 4 | – | 0 | 8 | – | 4 | – | 0 |
| Iowa State | 3 | – | 4 | – | 0 | 4 | – | 7 | – | 0 |
| Kansas | 2 | – | 5 | – | 0 | 4 | – | 6 | – | 1 |
| Colorado | 2 | – | 5 | – | 0 | 4 | – | 7 | – | 0 |
| Kansas State | 1 | – | 6 | – | 0 | 3 | – | 8 | – | 0 |
$ – Conference champion; Rankings from AP Poll

The 1983 Oklahoma Sooners football team represented the University of Oklahoma during the 1983 NCAA Division I-A football season. They played their home games at Oklahoma Memorial Stadium and competed as members of the Big Eight Conference. They were led by head coach Barry Switzer.

== Schedule ==
| Date | Opponent | Rank | Site | TV | Result | Attendance | Source |
|---|---|---|---|---|---|---|---|
| September 10 | at Stanford* | No. 2 | Stanford Stadium; Stanford, CA | | W 27–14 | 62,778 | |
| September 17 | No. 6 Ohio State* | No. 2 | Oklahoma Memorial Stadium; Norman, OK | ABC | L 14–24 | 75,008 | |
| September 24 | Tulsa* | No. 8 | Oklahoma Memorial Stadium; Norman, OK | | W 28–18 | 75,500 | |
| October 1 | at Kansas State | No. 9 | KSU Stadium; Manhattan, KS | Raycom | W 29–10 | 35,800 | |
| October 8 | vs. No. 2 Texas* | No. 8 | Cotton Bowl; Dallas, TX (Red River Shootout) | | L 16–28 | 75,587 | |
| October 15 | at Oklahoma State | No. 15 | Lewis Field; Stillwater, OK (Bedlam Series) | | W 21–20 | 50,440 | |
| October 22 | Iowa State | No. 16 | Oklahoma Memorial Stadium; Norman, OK | | W 49–11 | 75,008 | |
| October 29 | Kansas | No. 14 | Oklahoma Memorial Stadium; Norman, OK | | W 45–14 | 75,008 | |
| November 5 | at Missouri | No. 11 | Faurot Field; Columbia, MO (rivalry) | ABC | L 0–10 | 57,133 | |
| November 12 | Colorado | | Oklahoma Memorial Stadium; Norman, OK | KWGN | W 41–28 | 75,008 | |
| November 26 | No. 1 Nebraska | | Oklahoma Memorial Stadium; Norman, OK (rivalry) | CBS | L 21–28 | 75,008 | |
| December 3 | at Hawaii* | | Aloha Stadium; Halawa, HI | | W 21–17 | 45,143 | |
*Non-conference game; Rankings from AP Poll released prior to the game

== Rankings ==
Ranking movements Legend: ██ Increase in ranking ██ Decrease in ranking — = Not ranked т = Tied with team above or below ( ) = First-place votes
| | Week | | | | | | | | | | | | | | | |
| Poll | Pre | 1 | 2 | 3 | 4 | 5 | 6 | 7 | 8 | 9 | 10 | 11 | 12 | 13 | 14 | Final |
|---|---|---|---|---|---|---|---|---|---|---|---|---|---|---|---|---|
| AP | 2 (11) | 2 (3) | 2 (2) | 8 | 9 | 8 | 15 | 16 | 14 | 11 | — | — | — | — | 20т | — |
| Coaches Poll | 5 (6) | 4 (2) | 2 (2) | 10 | 7 | 7 | 17 | 17 | 14 | 11 | — | 20 | 16 | 20 | 20 | — |

== Game summaries ==
=== At Stanford ===
#2 Oklahoma Sooners at Stanford Cardinal

| Team | 1 | 2 | 3 | 4 | Total |
|---|---|---|---|---|---|
| • Oklahoma | 3 | 13 | 9 | 2 | 27 |
| Stanford | 0 | 7 | 0 | 7 | 14 |

- Date: Saturday, September 10
- Location: Stanford Stadium • Palo Alto, California
- Game attendance: 62,778
- Game weather: 80 degrees

=== #6 Ohio State ===
#6 Ohio State Buckeyes at #2 Oklahoma Sooners

| Team | 1 | 2 | 3 | 4 | Total |
|---|---|---|---|---|---|
| • #6 Ohio State | 7 | 7 | 7 | 3 | 24 |
| #2 Oklahoma | 0 | 7 | 7 | 0 | 14 |

- Date: Saturday, September 17
- Location: Memorial Stadium • Norman, Oklahoma
- Game attendance: 76,520
- Television network: ABC

=== Tulsa ===
Tulsa Golden Hurricane at #8 Oklahoma Sooners

| Team | 1 | 2 | 3 | 4 | Total |
|---|---|---|---|---|---|
| Tulsa | 0 | 0 | 0 | 18 | 18 |
| • Oklahoma | 14 | 14 | 0 | 0 | 28 |

- Date: Saturday, September 24
- Location: Memorial Stadium • Norman, Oklahoma
- Game attendance: 75,500

=== At Kansas State ===
#9 Oklahoma Sooners at Kansas State Wildcats

| Team | 1 | 2 | 3 | 4 | Total |
|---|---|---|---|---|---|
| • Oklahoma | 0 | 13 | 16 | 3 | 32 |
| Kansas State | 10 | 0 | 0 | 0 | 10 |

- Date: Saturday, October 1
- Location: KSU Stadium, Manhattan, Kansas
- Game attendance: 35,800

=== Vs. Texas ===
#2 Texas Longhorns vs #8 Oklahoma Sooners

| Team | 1 | 2 | 3 | 4 | Total |
|---|---|---|---|---|---|
| • #2 Texas | 0 | 7 | 21 | 0 | 28 |
| #8 Oklahoma | 7 | 0 | 3 | 6 | 16 |

- Date: Saturday, October 8
- Location: Cotton Bowl, Dallas
- Game attendance: 75,587
- Game weather: 68 degrees
- Television network: ABC

=== At Oklahoma State ===
#15 Oklahoma Sooners (2–2) at Oklahoma State Cowboys

| Quarter | 1 | 2 | 3 | 4 | Total |
|---|---|---|---|---|---|
| Oklahoma | 0 | 3 | 0 | 18 | 21 |
| Oklahoma St | 7 | 7 | 3 | 3 | 20 |

at Lewis Field, Stillwater, Oklahoma

- Date: October 15
- Game attendance: 50,440

Game information

First quarter

- OSU – Montgomery 14-yard blocked punt return (Larry Roach kick). Oklahoma St 7–0.

Second quarter

- OU – Tim Lashar 42-yard field goal. Oklahoma St 7–3. Drive:
- OSU – Shawn Jones 5-yard run (Larry Roach kick). Oklahoma St 14–3. Drive:

Third quarter

- OSU – Larry Roach 43-yard field goal. Oklahoma St 17–3. Drive:

Fourth quarter

- OSU – Larry Roach 31-yard field goal, 13:49. Oklahoma St 20–3. Drive:
- OU – Derrick Shepard 73-yard pass from Danny Bradley (Tim Lashar kick). Oklahoma St 20–10. Drive:
- OU – Spencer Tillman 5-yard run (pass good), 2:50. Oklahoma St 20–18. Drive:
- OU – Tim Lashar 46-yard field goal, 1:14. Oklahoma 21–20. Drive:

Top passers

- OU – Danny Bradley – 8/16, 147 yards, TD, INT
- OSU – Ike Jackson – 6/10, 39 yards, INT

Top rushers

- OU – Earl Johnson – 25 rushes, 105 yards
- OSU – Shawn Jones – 19 rushes, 76 yards, TD

Top receivers

- OU – Derrick Shepard – 3 receptions, 94 yards, TD
- OSU – John Chesley/Shawn Jones – 2 receptions, 13 yards

- Marcus Dupree left team during the week

=== Iowa State ===
Iowa State Cyclones at #16 Oklahoma Sooners

| Team | 1 | 2 | 3 | 4 | Total |
|---|---|---|---|---|---|
| Iowa State | 3 | 0 | 0 | 8 | 11 |
| • #16 Oklahoma | 14 | 21 | 7 | 7 | 49 |

- Date: Saturday, October 22
- Location: Oklahoma Memorial Stadium • Norman, Oklahoma
- Game attendance: 75,008

Scoring summary
| 1 | Iowa St | Bachrodt 34-yard field goal | Iowa St 3-0 |
| 1 | Oklahoma | Tillman 2-yard run (Lashar kick) | Oklahoma 7-3 |
| 1 | Oklahoma | Bradley 19-yard run (Lashar kick) | Oklahoma 14-3 |
| 2 | Oklahoma | Ledbetter 13-yard run (Lashar kick) | Oklahoma 21-3 |
| 2 | Oklahoma | Johnson 2-yard run (Lashar kick) | Oklahoma 28-3 |
| 2 | Oklahoma | Tillman 16-yard pass from Clopton (Lashar kick) | Oklahoma 35-3 |
| 3 | Oklahoma | Case 67-yard interception return (Lashar kick) | Oklahoma 42-3 |
| 4 | Iowa St | Wodka 2-yard pass from Archer (Jacobs pass from Archer) | Oklahoma 42-11 |
| 4 | Oklahoma | Clopton 1-yard run (Lashar kick) | Oklahoma 49-11 |

=== Kansas ===
Kansas Jayhawks at #2 Oklahoma Sooners

| Team | 1 | 2 | 3 | 4 | Total |
|---|---|---|---|---|---|
| Kansas | 7 | 7 | 0 | 0 | 14 |
| • #16 Oklahoma | 21 | 7 | 14 | 3 | 45 |

- Date: Saturday, October 22
- Location: Memorial Stadium, Norman, Oklahoma
- Game attendance: 75,008
- Game weather: 65 degrees

=== At Missouri ===
#11 Oklahoma Sooners at Missouri Tigers

| Team | 1 | 2 | 3 | 4 | Total |
|---|---|---|---|---|---|
| #11 Oklahoma | 0 | 0 | 0 | 0 | 0 |
| • Missouri | 3 | 7 | 0 | 0 | 10 |

- Date: Saturday, November 5
- Location: Faurot Field, Columbia, Missouri
- Game attendance: 57,133

=== Colorado ===
Colorado Buffaloes at Oklahoma Sooners

| Team | 1 | 2 | 3 | 4 | Total |
|---|---|---|---|---|---|
| Colorado | 0 | 7 | 7 | 14 | 28 |
| • Oklahoma | 13 | 21 | 7 | 0 | 41 |

- Date: Saturday, November 17
- Location: Memorial Stadium, Norman, Oklahoma
- Game attendance: 75,008

=== Nebraska ===
#1 Nebraska at Oklahoma

| Team | 1 | 2 | 3 | 4 | Total |
|---|---|---|---|---|---|
| • #1 Nebraska | 7 | 7 | 14 | 0 | 28 |
| Oklahoma | 0 | 14 | 7 | 0 | 21 |

- Date: November 26
- Location: Oklahoma Memorial Stadium, Norman, Oklahoma
- Game start: 2:30 p.m. CST
- Game attendance: 75,008
- Referee: John McClintock
- TV announcers (CBS): Gary Bender and Pat Haden

=== At Hawaii ===
Oklahoma Sooners at Hawaii Rainbow Warriors

| Team | 1 | 2 | 3 | 4 | Total |
|---|---|---|---|---|---|
| • Oklahoma | 0 | 0 | 14 | 7 | 21 |
| Hawaii | 0 | 10 | 0 | 7 | 17 |

- Date: Saturday, December 3
- Location: Aloha Stadium, Honolulu
- Game attendance: 45,143

== Personnel ==
1983 Oklahoma Sooners football team roster
Players
Coaches
Offense

| Pos. | # | Name | Class |
|---|---|---|---|
| TE | 85 | Darrin Berryhill | Sr |
| QB | 1 | Danny Bradley (C) | Jr |
| OL | 69 | Brent Burks | Jr |
| WR | 82 | Paul Clewis | Jr |
| QB | 15 | Mike Clopton | Jr |
| OL | 59 | David Dillingham | Jr |
| OL | 65 | Sidney Dodd | Jr |
| RB | 22 | Marcus Dupree | So |
| TE | 94 | Bill Earthman | Jr |
| TE | 83 | Johnny Fontenette | Sr |
| RB | 32 | Percy Hines | Fr |
| RB | 5 | Earl Johnson | Fr |
| RB | 20 | Jerome Ledbetter | Jr |
| G | 62 | Paul Parker (C) | Sr |
| OL | 71 | Jeff Pickett | Fr |
| OL | 63 | Eric Pope | So |
| WR | 4 | Buster Rhymes | Jr |
| RB | 25 | Alvin Ross | So |
| WR | 13 | Steve Sewell | Jr |
| WR | 3 | Derrick Shepard | Fr |
| OL | 73 | Chuck Thomas | Jr |
| FB | 34 | Spencer Tillman | Fr |
| RB | 30 | Darrell Weddington | Sr |

Defense

| Pos. | # | Name | Class |
|---|---|---|---|
| LB | 38 | Thomas Benson | Sr |
| DT | 80 | Rick Bryan (C) | Sr |
| DB | 10 | Scott Case (C) | Sr |
| DL | 92 | Tony Casillas | So |
| DB | 33 | Dwight Drane | Sr |
| DL | 46 | Darryl Goodlow | Sr |
| DE | 39 | Kevin Murphy | Jr |
| DB | 2 | Jim Rockford | Jr |
| LB | 49 | Jackie Shipp | Sr |
| DT | 68 | Bob Slater | Sr |
| DB | 19 | Keith Stanberry | Jr |

Special teams

| Pos. | # | Name | Class |
|---|---|---|---|
| K | 28 | David Culver | So |
| K | 31 | Tim Lashar | Fr |

Head coach

- Barry Switzer

Coordinators/assistant coaches

- Gary Gibbs (DC)
- Galen Hall (OC)
- Merv Johnson (OL)
- Chuck Lester (LB)
- Rex Norris (AHC)
- Lucious Selmon (DL)

Legend

- (C) Team captain
- (S) Suspended
- (I) Ineligible
- Injured
- Redshirt

Roster

== NFL draft ==
The following players were selected in the 1984 NFL draft following the season.

| Round | Pick | Player | Position | NFL team |
|---|---|---|---|---|
| 1 | 9 | Rick Bryan | Defensive tackle | Atlanta Falcons |
| 1 | 14 | Jackie Shipp | Linebacker | Miami Dolphins |
| 2 | 31 | Bob Slater | Defensive tackle | Washington Redskins |
| 2 | 32 | Scott Case | Defensive back | Atlanta Falcons |
| 2 | 36 | Thomas Benson | Linebacker | Atlanta Falcons |
| 12 | 325 | Paul Parker | Guard | St. Louis Cardinals |
