= 1983 Oklahoma State Cowboys football team =

American college football season

1983 Oklahoma State Cowboys football

Astro-Bluebonnet Bowl champion

Astro-Bluebonnet Bowl, W 24–14 vs. Baylor
- Conference: Big Eight Conference

Ranking
- Coaches: No. 18
- Record: 8–4 (3–4 Big 8)
- Head coach: Jimmy Johnson (5th season)
- Offensive coordinator: Larry Coker (1st season)
- Home stadium: Lewis Field

1983 Big Eight Conference football standings
	Conf.					Overall
Team	W		L		T	W		L		T
No. 2 Nebraska $	7	–	0	–	0	12	–	1	–	0
Missouri	5	–	2	–	0	7	–	5	–	0
Oklahoma	5	–	2	–	0	8	–	4	–	0
Oklahoma State	3	–	4	–	0	8	–	4	–	0
Iowa State	3	–	4	–	0	4	–	7	–	0
Kansas	2	–	5	–	0	4	–	6	–	1
Colorado	2	–	5	–	0	4	–	7	–	0
Kansas State	1	–	6	–	0	3	–	8	–	0
$ – Conference champion; Rankings from AP Poll

The 1983 Oklahoma State Cowboys football team represented Oklahoma State University in the 1983 NCAA Division I-A football season. This was the 83rd year of football at OSU and the fifth under Jimmy Johnson. The Cowboys played their home games at Lewis Field in Stillwater, Oklahoma. They finished the season 8–4, and 3–4 in the Big Eight Conference. The Cowboys were invited to the Astro-Bluebonnet Bowl, where they defeated Baylor, 24–14.

== Schedule ==
Date	Time	Opponent	Site	TV	Result	Attendance	Source
September 10		North Texas State*	Lewis Field; Stillwater, OK		W 20–13	44,700	
September 17		at Cincinnati*	Nippert Stadium; Cincinnati, OH		W 27–17	25,934	
September 24		at Texas A&M*	Kyle Field; College Station, TX		W 34–15	53,638	
October 1		Tulsa*	Lewis Field; Stillwater, OK (rivalry)		W 9–0	49,500	
October 8	1:30 p.m.	No. 1 Nebraska	Lewis Field; Stillwater, OK	KWTV	L 10–14	49,600	
October 15		No. 15 Oklahoma	Lewis Field; Stillwater, OK (Bedlam Series)		L 20–21	50,440	
October 22		at Kansas	Memorial Stadium; Lawrence, KS		W 27–10	31,300	
October 29		at Colorado	Folsom Field; Boulder, CO		W 40–14	36,889	
November 5		Kansas State^{†}	Lewis Field; Stillwater, OK		L 20–21	49,700	
November 12		at Missouri	Faurot Field; Columbia, MO		L 10–16	41,459	
November 19	1:00 p.m.	at Iowa State	Cyclone Stadium; Ames, IA		W 30–7	46,517	
December 31		vs. No. 20 Baylor*	Houston Astrodome; Houston, TX (Astro-Bluebonnet Bowl)	Mizlou	W 24–14	50,090	
*Non-conference game; ^{†}Homecoming; Rankings from AP Poll released prior to the game; All times are in Central time

== Game summaries ==
=== Oklahoma ===
#15 Oklahoma Sooners (2–2) at Oklahoma State Cowboys

Quarter	1	2	3	4	Total
Oklahoma	0	3	0	18	21
Oklahoma St	7	7	3	3	20

at Lewis Field, Stillwater, Oklahoma

- Date: October 15
- Game attendance: 50,440

Game information

First quarter

- OSU – Montgomery 14-yard blocked punt return (Larry Roach kick). Oklahoma St 7–0.

Second quarter

- OU – Tim Lashar 42-yard field goal. Oklahoma St 7–3. Drive:
- OSU – Shawn Jones 5-yard run (Larry Roach kick). Oklahoma St 14–3. Drive:

Third quarter

- OSU – Larry Roach 43-yard field goal. Oklahoma St 17–3. Drive:

Fourth quarter

- OSU – Larry Roach 31-yard field goal, 13:49. Oklahoma St 20–3. Drive:
- OU – Derrick Shepard 73-yard pass from Danny Bradley (Tim Lashar kick). Oklahoma St 20–10. Drive:
- OU – Spencer Tillman 5-yard run (pass good), 2:50. Oklahoma St 20–18. Drive:
- OU – Tim Lashar 46-yard field goal, 1:14. Oklahoma 21–20. Drive:

Top passers

- OU – Danny Bradley – 8/16, 147 yards, TD, INT
- OSU – Ike Jackson – 6/10, 39 yards, INT

Top rushers

- OU – Earl Johnson – 25 rushes, 105 yards
- OSU – Shawn Jones – 19 rushes, 76 yards, TD

Top receivers

- OU – Derrick Shepard – 3 receptions, 94 yards, TD
- OSU – John Chesley/Shawn Jones – 2 receptions, 13 yards

== Roster ==
1983 Oklahoma State Cowboys football team roster
Players
Coaches
Offense

Pos.	#	Name	Class
RB		Ernest Anderson
OL		Paul Blair
OL		John Cegielski
TE		John Chesley
RB		Kelly Cook
RB		Charles Crawford
TE		Barry Hanna
WR		Jamie Harris
RB		Rodney Hayes
QB		Rusty Hilger
OL		Kevin Igo
QB		Ike Jackson
RB		Shawn Jones
WR		Mike Kilmer
WR		Malcolm Lewis
OL		Ralph Partida
RB		Arthur Price
WR		Bob Riley
RB		Will Timmons
OL		David Tucker
WR		Terry Werner
RB		Kenny Zachary

Defense

Pos.	#	Name	Class
DB		Rod Brown
DB		Rod Fisher
DL		James Ham
DL		Rodney Harding
DB		Adam Hinds
LB		Matt Monger
DB	44	Mark Moore	Fr
DL		Leslie O'Neal
DB		Chris Rockins
LB		James Spencer
DL		Warren Thompson
DL		John Washington
DL		David Webb

Special teams

Pos.	#	Name	Class
P		John Conway
K		Larry Roach

Head coach

- Jimmy Johnson

Coordinators/assistant coaches

- Larry Coker – Offensive coordinator
- Pat Jones – Running backs
- Butch Davis – Wide receivers/tight ends
- Tony Wise – Offensive line
- George Walstad – Defensive line
- Reggie Herring – Linebackers
- Paul Jette – Defensive backs
- Bill Shimek – Assistant

Legend

- (C) Team captain
- (S) Suspended
- (I) Ineligible
- Injured
- Redshirt

== After the season ==
The 1984 NFL draft took place on May 1–2, 1984 at the Omni Park Central Hotel in New York City. The following Oklahoma State players were selected during the draft.

Player	Position	Round	Pick	NFL team
Chris Rockins	S	2nd	48	Cleveland Browns
Ernest Anderson	RB	3rd	41	Detroit Lions
James Spencer	LB	10th	268	Minnesota Vikings
John Chesley	TE	10th	277	Miami Dolphins
Rod Fisher	DB	12th	309	Los Angeles Rams
