= Darrell Shepard =

American football player (born c.1959)

Darrell Shepard (born c. 1959) is a former American football quarterback who played for the Houston Cougars in 1977 and the Oklahoma Sooners from 1979 to 1981. Shepard is also the all-time leading passer for Odessa High School. In 1976, he passed for 1,156 yards and ran for 920 yards and was named to the Parade All American team. He is the older brother of the late Derrick Shepard and the uncle of Sterling Shepard, both of whom played for the Oklahoma Sooners during their college careers. His brother, Woodie Shepard, also played football for the Oklahoma Sooners.
