= 1983 Missouri Tigers football team =

American college football season

1983 Missouri Tigers football

Holiday Bowl, L 17–21 vs. BYU
- Conference: Big Eight Conference
- Record: 7–5 (5–2 Big 8)
- Head coach: Warren Powers (6th season)
- Offensive coordinator: Larry Beightol (1st season)
- Defensive coordinator: Mark Heydorff (1st season)
- Home stadium: Faurot Field

1983 Big Eight Conference football standings
	Conf.					Overall
Team	W		L		T	W		L		T
No. 2 Nebraska $	7	–	0	–	0	12	–	1	–	0
Missouri	5	–	2	–	0	7	–	5	–	0
Oklahoma	5	–	2	–	0	8	–	4	–	0
Oklahoma State	3	–	4	–	0	8	–	4	–	0
Iowa State	3	–	4	–	0	4	–	7	–	0
Kansas	2	–	5	–	0	4	–	6	–	1
Colorado	2	–	5	–	0	4	–	7	–	0
Kansas State	1	–	6	–	0	3	–	8	–	0
$ – Conference champion; Rankings from AP Poll

The 1983 Missouri Tigers football team was an American football team that represented the University of Missouri in the Big Eight Conference (Big 8) during the 1983 NCAA Division I-A football season. The team compiled a 7–5 record (5–2 against Big 8 opponents), finished in a tie for second place in the Big 8, and outscored its opponents by a combined total of 292 to 202. Warren Powers was the head coach for the sixth of seven seasons. The team played its home games at Faurot Field in Columbia, Missouri.

The team's statistical leaders included Eric Drain with 685 rushing yards, Marlon Adler with 1,603 passing yards, and George Shorthose with 483 receiving yards.

After 1983, Missouri endured 13 consecutive losing seasons.

== Schedule ==
Date	Opponent	Rank	Site	Result	Attendance	Source
September 10	Illinois*		Faurot Field; Columbia, MO (rivalry)	W 28–18	53,744	
September 17	at Wisconsin*		Camp Randall Stadium; Madison, WI	L 20–21	65,044	
September 24	Utah State*		Faurot Field; Columbia, MO	W 17–10	45,033	
October 1	East Carolina*		Faurot Field; Columbia, MO	L 6–13	48,268	
October 8	at Colorado		Folsom Field; Boulder, CO	W 59–20	37,157	
October 15	No. 1 Nebraska		Faurot Field; Columbia, MO (rivalry)	L 13–34	72,348	
October 22	Kansas State		Faurot Field; Columbia, MO	W 38–0	46,248	
October 29	at Iowa State		Cyclone Stadium; Ames, IA (rivalry)	W 41–18	49,404	
November 5	No. 11 Oklahoma		Faurot Field; Columbia, MO (rivalry)	W 10–0	57,133	
November 12	Oklahoma State		Faurot Field; Columbia, MO	W 16–10	41,459	
November 19	at Kansas	No. 19	Memorial Stadium; Lawrence, KS (Border War)	L 27–37	38,400	
December 23	vs. No. 9 BYU*		Jack Murphy Stadium; San Diego, CA (Holiday Bowl)	L 17–21	51,480	
*Non-conference game; Rankings from AP Poll released prior to the game

== Roster ==
1983 Missouri Tigers football team roster
Players
Coaches
Offense

Pos.	#	Name	Class
TE	86	Duane Davis	Sr
TE	88	Tony Davis	So
G	61	James Dempsey	Jr
OT	70	Denis Downey	Sr
OT	78	Andy Ekern	Sr
TE	83	Andy Giber	Sr
OT	76	Conrad Goode	Jr
C	53	Phil Greenfield	So

Defense

Pos.	#	Name	Class
DE	96	Bobby Bell	Jr
DE	58	Stan Green	Sr
DB	6	Raymond Harrison	Sr

Special teams

Pos.	#	Name	Class

Head coach

- Warren Powers

Coordinators/assistant coaches

- Larry Beightol – Offensive coordinator
- Jim Donnan – Quarterbacks and wide receivers
- Steve Schottel – Running backs
- Mark Heydorff – Defensive coordinator
- Charlie Sadler – Linebacker
- Dave Wommack – Defensive line
- Chip Powell – Assistant
- Mike Wade – Assistant
- Mike Wynn – Assistant
- Russ Ball – Assistant

Legend

- (C) Team captain
- (S) Suspended
- (I) Ineligible
- Injured
- Redshirt
