= Sterling Shepard =

American football player (born 1993)

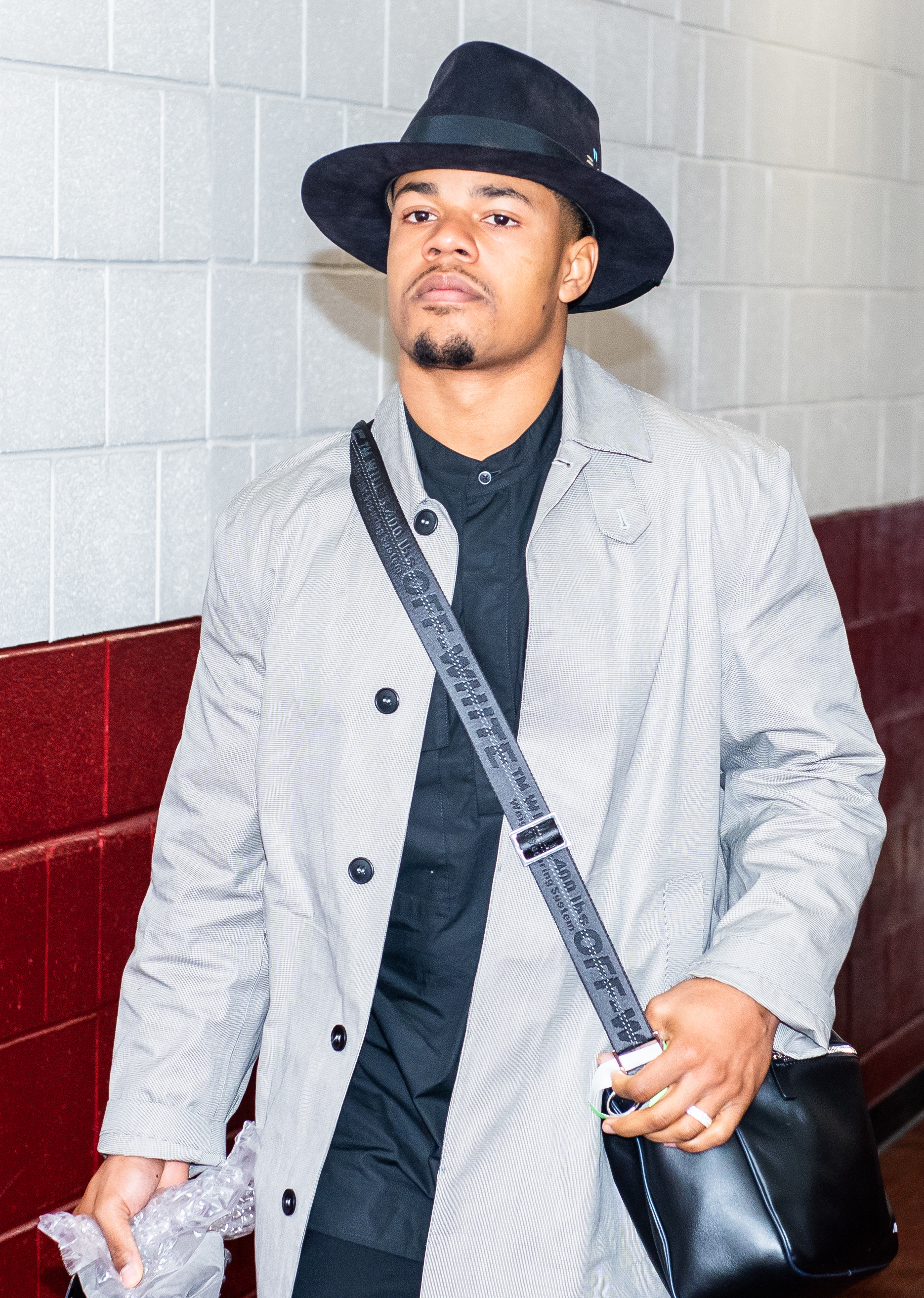
- Shepard in 2019

No. 87 – New York Jets
- Position: Wide receiver
- Roster status: Active

Personal information
- Born: February 10, 1993 (age 33); Oklahoma City, Oklahoma, U.S.
- Listed height: 5 ft 10 in (1.78 m)
- Listed weight: 194 lb (88 kg)

Career information
- High school: Heritage Hall (Oklahoma City)
- College: Oklahoma (2012–2015)
- NFL draft: 2016: 2nd round, 40th overall pick

Career history
- New York Giants (2016–2023); Tampa Bay Buccaneers (2024–2025); Houston Texans (2026)*; New York Jets (2026–present)
- * Offseason or practice squad member only

Awards and highlights
- PFWA All-Rookie Team (2016); Disney Spirit Award (2014); First-team All-American (2015); 2× First-team All-Big 12 (2014, 2015)

Career NFL statistics as of Week 4, 2026
- Receptions: 444
- Receiving yards: 4,803
- Receiving touchdowns: 25
- Rushing yards: 274
- Rushing touchdowns: 1
- Stats at Pro Football Reference

Sterling Clay Shepard (born February 10, 1993) is an American professional football wide receiver for the New York Jets of the National Football League (NFL). He played college football for the Oklahoma Sooners. Shepard was selected by the New York Giants in the second round of the 2016 NFL draft.

== Early life ==
Shepard was born on February 10, 1993. Shepard attended Heritage Hall School in Oklahoma City, Oklahoma, where he rushed for 1,115 yards and caught 133 passes for 2,335 yards and 38 touchdowns in his high school football career. As a senior, he carried the ball 28 times for 303 yards and eight touchdowns and caught 73 passes for 1,243 yards and 17 touchdowns. Following his senior season, he was selected to the Under Armour All-American Game. In addition, Shepard competed in basketball and track at Heritage. As a senior in 2011, he placed second in the long jump at the State Meet with a leap of 6.69 meters (21'11.5").

Shepard was a consensus four-star recruit by ESPN.com, Rivals.com, 247sports.com and Scout.com. He committed to the University of Oklahoma to play college football under head coach Bob Stoops.

== College career ==
As a true freshman at the University of Oklahoma in 2012, Shepard played in all 13 games with four starts and had 45 receptions for 621 yards and three touchdowns. He made his collegiate debut on September 8, against Florida A&M, and had three receptions for 48 receiving yards. In the following game, he had seven receptions for 108 receiving yards and his first collegiate receiving touchdown against Kansas State. As a sophomore in 2013, he started 12 of 13 games, recording 51 receptions for 603 yards and seven touchdowns. On September 14, against Tulsa, he had the best game of his collegiate career to that point with eight receptions for 123 receiving yards and two receiving touchdowns. In the 2014 Sugar Bowl against Alabama, he had his first collegiate rushing touchdown on a 13-yard play. Shepard started 12 of 13 games as a junior in 2014. He started off the season very strong with career-highs in receiving yards at first against Tulsa with 177 and 215 later on against TCU. After recording 49 receptions for 911 yards and five touchdowns through the first seven games of the season, he suffered a groin injury on a reception against Iowa State, which caused him to miss the rest of that game and the next week's game against Baylor and limited him to one reception for 13 yards during the final four games. As a senior in 2015, he played in all 14 games and had 86 receptions for 1,288 yards and 11 touchdowns. On September 2, against Tennessee, he caught a five-yard touchdown from Baker Mayfield with only 40 seconds remaining to help force overtime. In the second overtime, he caught a game-winning 18-yard pass from Mayfield. For his collegiate career, he had 233 receptions for 3,482 yards and 26 touchdowns.

== Professional career ==
Pre-draft measurables
Height	Weight	Arm length	Hand span	Wingspan	40-yard dash	10-yard split	20-yard split	20-yard shuttle	Three-cone drill	Vertical jump	Broad jump	Bench press
5 ft 10 1/4 in (1.78 m)	194 lb (88 kg)	30 3/8 in (0.77 m)	9 3/4 in (0.25 m)	5 ft 11 5/8 in (1.82 m)	4.48 s	1.50 s	2.60 s	4.35 s	7.00 s	41.0 in (1.04 m)	10 ft 3 in (3.12 m)	20 reps
All values from NFL Combine

=== New York Giants ===
==== 2016 ====
Shepard was selected by the New York Giants in the second round with the 40th overall pick in the 2016 NFL draft. He was the fifth wide receiver to be selected that year. On May 6, 2016, the Giants signed Shepard to a four-year, $5.94 million contract that includes $3.24 million guaranteed and a signing bonus of $2.52 million.

Going into the regular season, Shepard was named a starting wide receiver, along with Odell Beckham Jr. He started Giants' season opener against the Dallas Cowboys and made three receptions for 43-yards and caught his first career touchdown on a nine-yard pass from Eli Manning, helping the Giants win 20–19. The following week, Shepard caught a season-high eight passes for 117 receiving yards in a 16–13 victory over the New Orleans Saints. On September 25, 2016, he caught five passes for 73 yards and caught a 23-yard touchdown pass from Eli Manning during the Giants' first loss of the season to the Washington Redskins. On November 6, 2016, he continued to emerge as a promising receiver after he made three receptions for 50 yards and caught a 23-yard touchdown pass in a victory over the Philadelphia Eagles. The following game, Shepard caught five passes for 42 receiving yards and a touchdown in a 21–20 win over the Cincinnati Bengals.

On November 20, 2016, Shepard had his third game in a row with a touchdown after he finished a 22–16 victory over the Chicago Bears with five catches for 50 yards and a touchdown. In a Week 16 match-up against the Philadelphia Eagles, Shepard made seven catches for 61 yards and a touchdown as the Giants lost 24–19. He finished the season with 65 receptions for 683 receiving yards and eight receiving touchdowns. The Giants made the playoffs with an 11–5 record. In his playoff debut, he had four receptions for 63 receiving yards in the 38–13 Wild Card Round loss to the Green Bay Packers. He was named to the Pro Football Writers of America NFL All-Rookie Team following the season.

==== 2017 ====
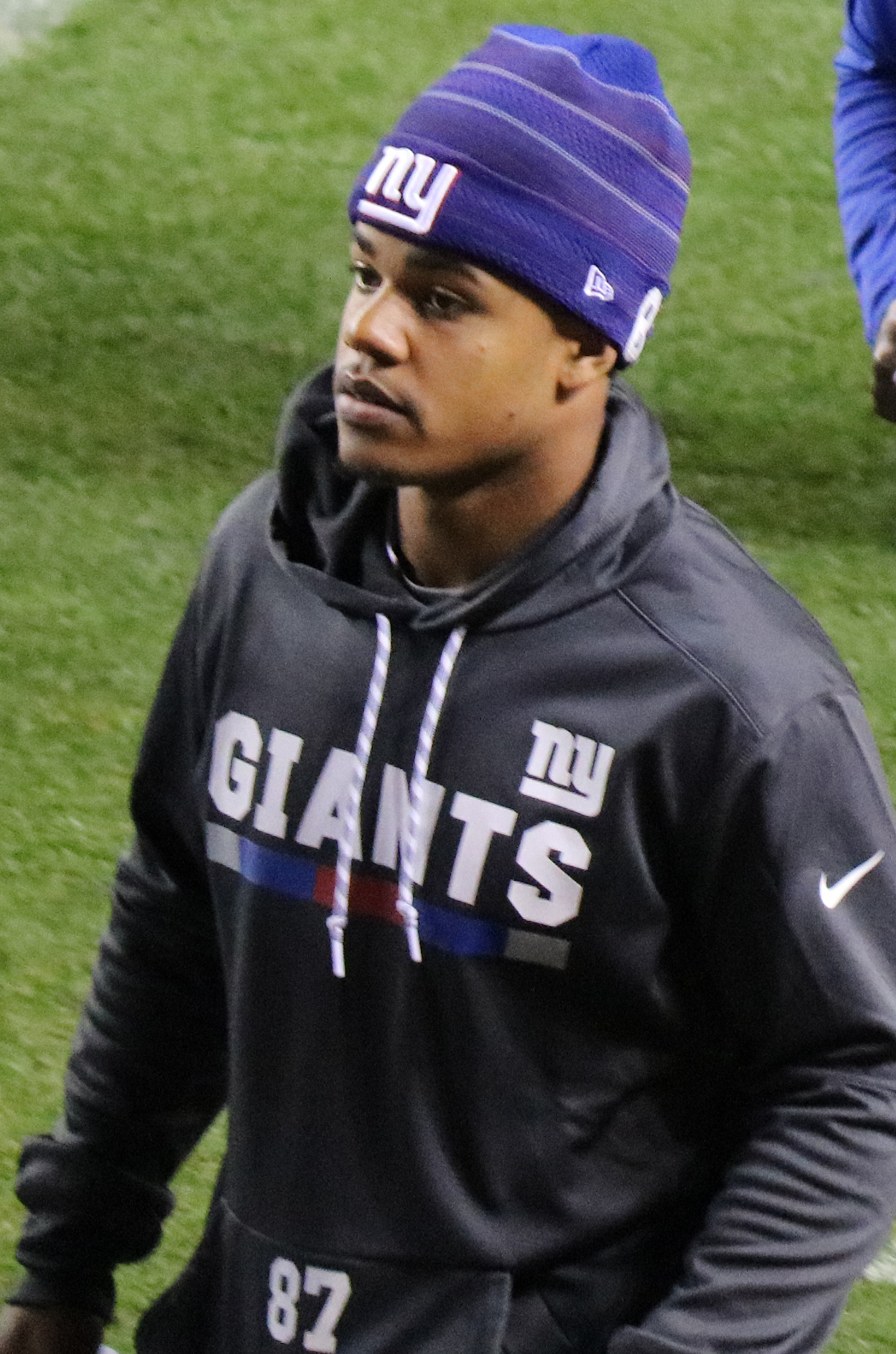
Shepard with the New York Giants in 2017

Shepard started the 2017 season off with nine receptions for 67 receiving yards combined in the first two games against the Cowboys and Detroit Lions. In the next game, against the Eagles, he had seven receptions for 133 receiving yards and a receiving touchdown, which was a 77-yard reception. During the 2017 season, Shepard missed multiple games due to reported issues with migraines. During Week 10 against the San Francisco 49ers, Shepard had a career high eleven receptions for 142 receiving yards as the Giants lost 31–21. Later that season, in Week 15 against the Philadelphia Eagles, Shepard tied his career high for receptions, and set a new high for targets, with sixteen. Shepard also caught a touchdown pass, which he did not during Week 10. Overall, he finished the 2017 season with 59 receptions for 731 receiving yards and two receiving touchdowns.

==== 2018 ====
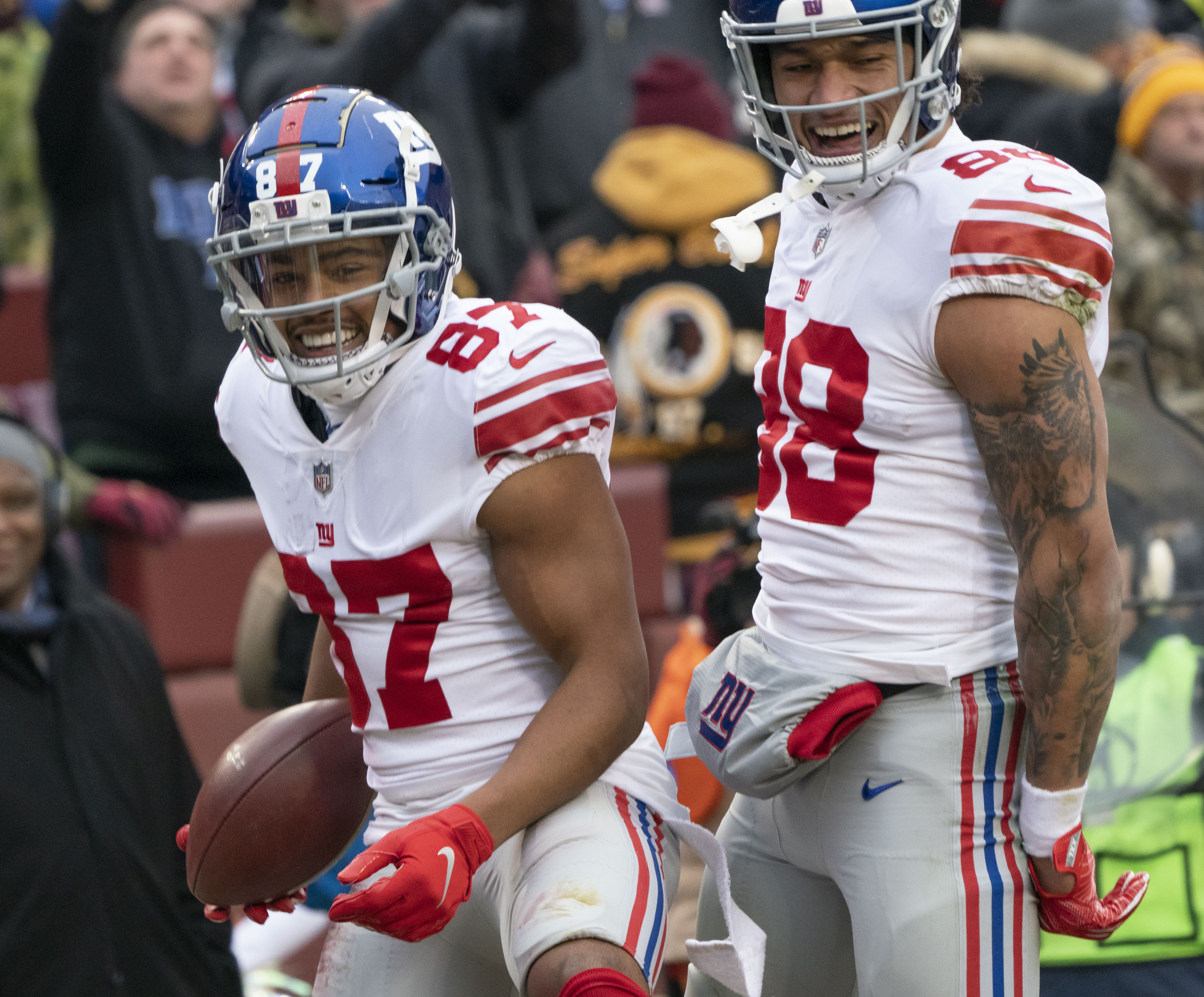
Shepard (left) with the Giants in 2018

In Week 7, against the Atlanta Falcons, Shepard had five receptions for 167 yards. In Week 10 against the 49ers, Shepard had two catches for nine yards and the game-winning touchdown in the 27–23 win. Overall, he finished the 2018 season with 66 receptions for 872 yards and four touchdowns.

==== 2019 ====
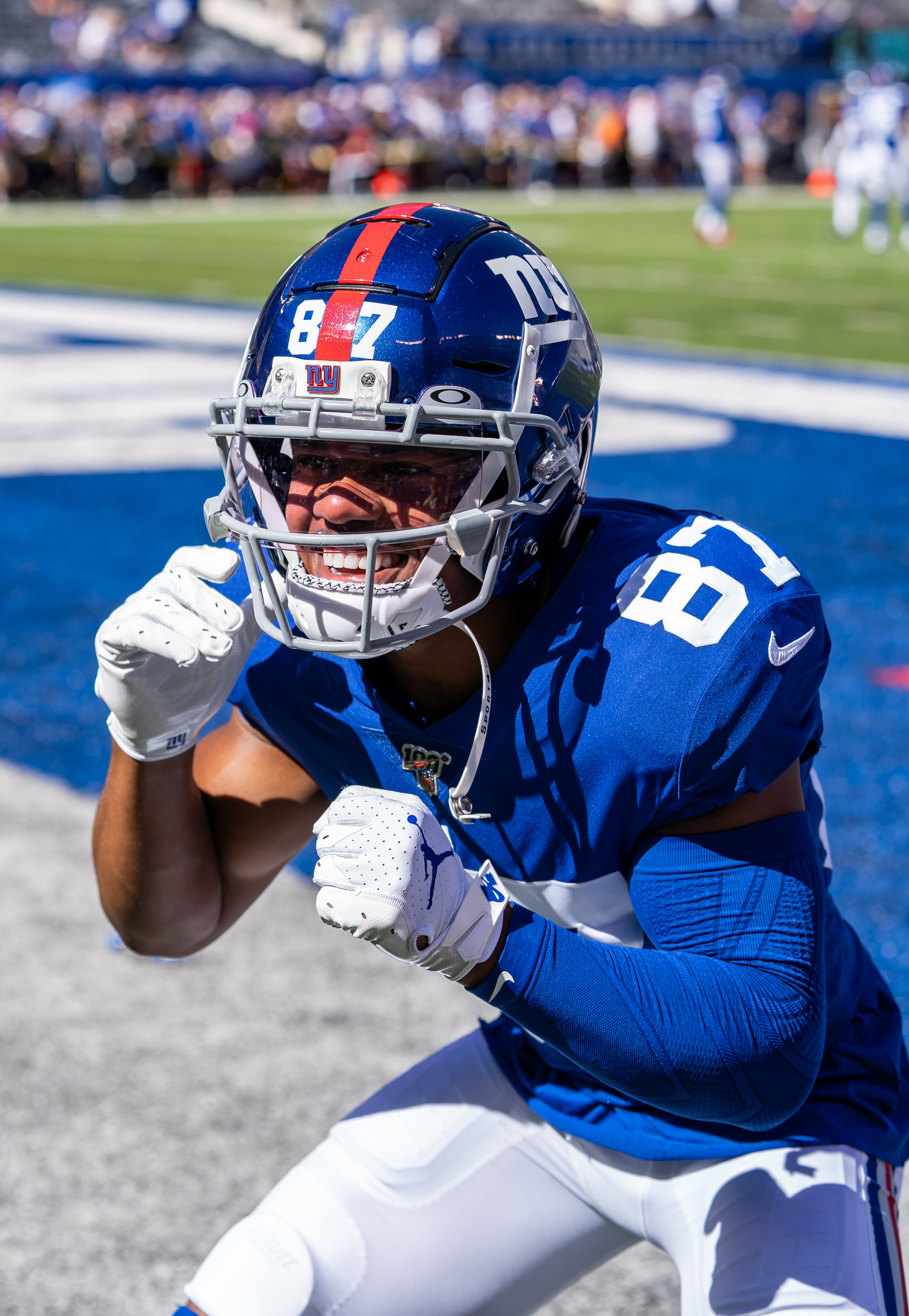
Shepard with the Giants in 2019

On April 10, 2019, Shepard signed a four-year, $41 million contract extension with the Giants with $21.3 million guaranteed. In Week 3 against the Tampa Bay Buccaneers, Shepard caught seven passes for 100 yards and a touchdown as the Giants won 32–31. In Week 15 against the Miami Dolphins, Shepard caught a season high nine passes for 111 yards in the 36–20 win. Overall, Shepard finished the 2019 season with 57 receptions for 576 receiving yards and three receiving touchdowns.

==== 2020 ====
During Week 2 against the Bears, Shepard left the game in the second quarter with a toe injury and did not return. On September 23, 2020, Shepard was placed on injured reserve with turf toe. He was activated on October 22, 2020. In Week 17 against the Cowboys, Shepard recorded eight catches for 112 yards and a touchdown and rushed for 24 yards and another touchdown during the 23–19 win. He finished the 2020 season with 66 receptions for 656 yards and three touchdowns in 12 games.

==== 2021 ====
In Week 1, Shepard finished the game with seven receptions for 113 yards and a touchdown in a 27–13 loss to the Denver Broncos.

In Week 15, Shepard suffered a season-ending torn Achilles, in the Giants loss to the Cowboys. He was placed on injured reserve the next day. He finished the 2021 season with 36 receptions for 366 yards and one touchdown in seven games.

==== 2022 ====
In Week 3 against the Cowboys, Shepard tore his left ACL in the fourth quarter during the 16–23 loss. He was placed on injured reserve on September 28, 2022, ending his season after three games.

==== 2023 ====
On March 12, 2023, Shepard signed a one-year contract with the Giants. In the 2023 season, he appeared in 15 games and started two. He finished with ten receptions for 57 yards and a touchdown, which came in Week 10 against Dallas.

=== Tampa Bay Buccaneers ===
==== 2024 ====
On June 10, 2024, Shepard signed a one-year contract with the Tampa Bay Buccaneers. He was released on August 27, and re-signed to the practice squad. He was promoted to the active roster on October 1. He finished the 2024 season with 32 receptions for 334 yards and one touchdown.

==== 2025 ====
On March 24, 2025, Shepard signed a one-year, $2.25 million contract extension with the Buccaneers. In the 2025 season, Shepard had 39 receptions for 371 yards and one touchdown in 13 games.

=== Houston Texans ===
On August 22, 2026, Shepard signed with the Houston Texans. Shepard was released by the Texans as a part of final roster cuts on August 30.

=== New York Jets ===
On September 15, 2026, Shepard signed with the New York Jets' practice squad.

== Career statistics ==
=== NFL ===
==== Regular season ====
Year	Team	Games		Receiving					Rushing					Fumbles	
Year	Team	GP	GS	Rec	Yds	Avg	Y/G	TD	Att	Yds	Avg	Y/G	TD	Fum	Lost
2016	NYG	16	16	65	683	10.5	42.7	8	3	31	10.3	1.9	0	0	0
2017	NYG	11	10	59	731	12.4	66.5	2	4	4	1.0	0.4	0	1	0
2018	NYG	16	16	66	872	13.2	54.5	4	3	33	11.0	2.1	0	1	0
2019	NYG	10	10	57	576	10.1	57.6	3	6	72	12.0	7.2	0	0	0
2020	NYG	12	12	66	656	9.9	54.7	3	6	49	8.2	4.1	1	0	0
2021	NYG	7	6	36	366	10.2	52.3	1	1	−9	−9.0	−1.3	0	0	0
2022	NYG	3	2	13	154	11.8	51.3	1	0	0	0.0	0	0	0	0
2023	NYG	15	2	10	57	5.7	3.8	1	1	6	6.0	0.4	0	1	0
2024	TB	14	5	32	334	10.4	23.9	1	8	69	8.6	4.9	0	0	0
2025	TB	13	2	39	371	9.5	28.5	1	4	19	4.8	1.9	0	1	0
2026	NYJ	2	0	1	3	3.0	1.5	0	0	0	0.0	0.0	0	0	0
Career		119	81	444	4,803	10.8	40.4	25	36	274	7.6	2.4	1	4	0

==== Postseason ====
Year	Team	Games		Receiving					Rushing					Fumbles	
Year	Team	GP	GS	Rec	Yds	Avg	Y/G	TD	Att	Yds	Avg	Y/G	TD	Fum	Lost
2016	NYG	1	1	4	63	15.8	63	0	—	—	—	—	—	0	0
2022	NYG	0	0	Did not play due to injury											
2024	TB	1	0	—	—	—	—	—	—	—	—	—	—	0	0
Career		1	1	4	63	15.8	63	0	0	0	0.0	0	0	0	0

=== College ===
Season	Team	Conf	Class	Pos	GP	Receiving			
Season	Team	Conf	Class	Pos	GP	Rec	Yds	Avg	TD
2012	Oklahoma	Big 12	FR	WR	13	45	621	13.8	3
2013	Oklahoma	Big 12	SO	WR	12	51	603	11.8	7
2014	Oklahoma	Big 12	JR	WR	11	51	970	19.0	5
2015	Oklahoma	Big 12	SR	WR	13	86	1,288	15.0	11
Career					49	233	3,482	14.9	26

== Personal life ==
His father, Derrick Shepard, played at Oklahoma and in the NFL from 1987 to 1991 as a wide receiver. He died when Sterling was six. His uncles, Darrell (1980–81) and Woodie (1975–79), also played at Oklahoma.

Shepard married model Chanel Iman on March 3, 2018. On August 10, 2018, their first child, Cali Clay Shepard, was born. On December 17, 2019, they welcomed their second daughter, Cassie Snow Shepard. In January 2022, Shepard and Iman announced that they would be getting divorced.

Shepard was engaged to his long-term girlfriend, Carolyn Estephany.
