= 1983 Kansas State Wildcats football team =

American college football season

1983 Kansas State Wildcats football
- Conference: Big Eight Conference
- Record: 3–8 (1–6 Big 8)
- Head coach: Jim Dickey (6th season)
- Home stadium: KSU Stadium

1983 Big Eight Conference football standings
	Conf.					Overall
Team	W		L		T	W		L		T
No. 2 Nebraska $	7	–	0	–	0	12	–	1	–	0
Missouri	5	–	2	–	0	7	–	5	–	0
Oklahoma	5	–	2	–	0	8	–	4	–	0
Oklahoma State	3	–	4	–	0	8	–	4	–	0
Iowa State	3	–	4	–	0	4	–	7	–	0
Kansas	2	–	5	–	0	4	–	6	–	1
Colorado	2	–	5	–	0	4	–	7	–	0
Kansas State	1	–	6	–	0	3	–	8	–	0
$ – Conference champion; Rankings from AP Poll

The 1983 Kansas State Wildcats football team represented Kansas State University in the 1983 NCAA Division I-A football season. The team's head football coach was Jim Dickey. The Wildcats played their home games in KSU Stadium. 1983 saw the team finish with a record of 3–8, and a 1–6 record in Big Eight Conference play.

== Schedule ==
Date	Opponent	Site	Result	Attendance	Source
September 3	Long Beach State*	KSU Stadium; Manhattan, KS	L 20–28	28,700	
September 10	at Kentucky*	Commonwealth Stadium; Lexington, KY	L 12–31	56,123	
September 17	TCU*	KSU Stadium; Manhattan, KS	W 20–3	25,400	
September 24	Wyoming*	KSU Stadium; Manhattan, KS	W 27–25	36,700	
October 1	No. 9 Oklahoma	KSU Stadium; Manhattan, KS	L 10–29	35,800	
October 15	at Kansas	Memorial Stadium; Lawrence, KS (rivalry)	L 3–31	49,300	
October 22	at Missouri	Faurot Field; Columbia, MO	L 0–38	46,248	
October 29	No. 1 Nebraska	KSU Stadium; Manhattan, KS (rivalry)	L 25–51	44,150	
November 5	at Oklahoma State	Lewis Field; Stillwater, OK	W 21–20	49,700	
November 12	Iowa State^{†}	KSU Stadium; Manhattan, KS (rivalry)	L 27–49	24,300	
November 19	at Colorado	Folsom Field; Boulder, CO (rivalry)	L 21–38	27,649	
*Non-conference game; ^{†}Homecoming; Rankings from AP Poll released prior to the game
