= Don Criqui =

American sportscaster

- Born: October 1, 1940 (age 86); Buffalo, New York, U.S.
- Years active: 1967–2018
- Spouse: Molly Criqui (m. 1963; died 2024)
- Children: 5
- Sports commentary career
- Genre: Play-by-play
- Sports: American football, basketball, ice hockey, golf, tennis

Don Criqui (/ˈkrɪkiː/ CRICK-ee) (born October 1, 1940) is an American former sportscaster.

He holds the record for longest-tenured NFL broadcaster in U.S. TV history, calling NFL football for 47 seasons (1967–2013) on NBC and CBS. Criqui's final NFL broadcast came on December 8, 2013, when he filled in for Bill Macatee as he was having traveling issues in an ice storm in Dallas, calling the 27-26 New England Patriots victory over the Cleveland Browns.

Criqui also had a long career calling college football. Criqui called 11 Orange Bowl games while with NBC, including games that decided the college football national championship for 1981, 1983, 1984, 1985 and 1987. From 2006 until 2017, Criqui served as the football radio play-by-play voice for Notre Dame, his alma mater.

Criqui's most recent network assignment was CBS Sports from 1998 until 2013, where he called the NFL, women's and men's college basketball and college football. From 1995 to 2012, he was the voice of New England Patriots pre-season football with Randy Cross.

== Early life ==
Criqui is a native of Buffalo, New York and grew up in the suburb of Kenmore.

He graduated from St. Joseph's Collegiate Institute in Kenmore, before attending the University of Notre Dame. He served in the U.S. Air Force Reserve.

== Career ==
Criqui began with CBS in 1967 before moving to NBC Sports in 1979; he was 'traded' by CBS to NBC for Curt Gowdy. When CBS reacquired the NFL in 1998, Criqui rejoined the network, and continued to serve as a play-by-play announcer as part of the NFL on CBS until his retirement from that position after the 2012 season. In 2013 he returned for the Cleveland Browns vs. New England Patriots matchup on CBS with his former partner Steve Tasker, as Bill Macatee could not make it due to his flight being cancelled by a snowstorm.

He has also announced a number of other sports for CBS, NBC and ESPN including college football, college basketball, the ABA, the NBA, the NHL, professional golf and tennis tournaments, Triple Crown horse racing, the Canadian Football League and several Summer Olympics events.

During his tenure at NBC, Criqui called 14 Orange Bowl games. Criqui's most memorable call was the 1984 Orange Bowl between undefeated Nebraska and Miami. Nebraska was on a 22-game winning streak coming into the game, but lost to Miami 31–30 when the Cornhuskers failed on a two-point conversion attempt which would have won the game. His most famous college basketball call was most likely the last-second upset by St. Joseph's over top-seeded DePaul in the Mideast regional second round of the 1981 NCAA Tournament.

Criqui was the radio play-by-play voice of Notre Dame Fighting Irish football on the Notre Dame IMG Sports Network from 2006 to 2018.

=== Other projects ===
His other projects include hosting radio talk shows about sports, serving as a part-time TV announcer for the New York Mets in 1991, and working as the play-by-play announcer for New England Patriots pre-season telecasts on WCVB-TV, Boston from 1995 to 2008 and for WBZ-TV, Boston from 2009 to 2012. Criqui was also for many years the key spokesperson for Trans World Airlines, appearing as himself in many television, radio and print advertisements as part of the Ogilvy & Mather-produced advertising campaign: "You're Gonna Like Us (sm). TWA.", which ran between 1978 and 1984 in support of the airline's domestic U.S. marketing efforts.

For years, he also served as co-host of the weekend version of the newsmagazine Inside Edition. He also served as a sportscaster on WOR radio in New York on the Rambling with Gambling show, as well as on WNBC radio on Imus in the Morning.

=== Memorable NFL calls ===
One of Criqui's most memorable NFL calls came on November 8, 1970: Tom Dempsey's 63-yard field goal that lifted the New Orleans Saints to a 19–17 victory over the Detroit Lions at New Orleans' Tulane Stadium. Other memorable NFL games that Criqui took part in were the 1978 "Miracle at the Meadowlands" and the 1982 "Epic in Miami". Criqui also did play-by-play of the 1985–86 seasons of Monday Night Football and Super Bowls XX and XXI (alongside Bob Trumpy) for NBC Radio. He also called "Red Right 88" in 1980, when Brian Sipe threw an interception in the end zone to end the Cleveland Browns' season. He along with Randy Cross called the Detroit Lions' comeback victory over the Browns in 2009.

He was presented with the Pete Rozelle Radio-Television Award from the Pro Football Hall of Fame in 2003. He is also a member of the Greater Buffalo Sports Hall of Fame.

== Personal life ==
Criqui lives in Essex Fells, New Jersey; He has four sons, one daughter, and fifteen grandchildren. Don's wife of over 60 years, Molly, died on June 2, 2024, at the age of 82.

Preceded by Jack Buck	Monday Night Football national radio play-by-play announcer 1985-1986	Succeeded by Jack Buck
