= 1983 Iowa State Cyclones football team =

American college football season

1983 Iowa State Cyclones football
- Conference: Big Eight Conference
- Record: 4–7 (3–4 Big 8)
- Head coach: Jim Criner (1st season)
- Defensive coordinator: Mike Knoll (1st season)
- Home stadium: Cyclone Stadium

1983 Big Eight Conference football standings
| | Conf. | | | | | Overall |
| Team | W | | L | | T | W | | L | | T |
|---|---|---|---|---|---|---|---|---|---|---|
| No. 2 Nebraska $ | 7 | – | 0 | – | 0 | 12 | – | 1 | – | 0 |
| Missouri | 5 | – | 2 | – | 0 | 7 | – | 5 | – | 0 |
| Oklahoma | 5 | – | 2 | – | 0 | 8 | – | 4 | – | 0 |
| Oklahoma State | 3 | – | 4 | – | 0 | 8 | – | 4 | – | 0 |
| Iowa State | 3 | – | 4 | – | 0 | 4 | – | 7 | – | 0 |
| Kansas | 2 | – | 5 | – | 0 | 4 | – | 6 | – | 1 |
| Colorado | 2 | – | 5 | – | 0 | 4 | – | 7 | – | 0 |
| Kansas State | 1 | – | 6 | – | 0 | 3 | – | 8 | – | 0 |
$ – Conference champion; Rankings from AP Poll

The 1983 Iowa State Cyclones football team represented Iowa State University as a member of the Big Eight Conference during the 1983 NCAA Division I-A football season. Led by first-year head coach Jim Criner, the Cyclones compiled an overall record of 4–7 with a mark of 3–4 in conference play, tying for fourth place in the Big 8. Iowa State played home games on campus at Cyclone Stadium in Ames, Iowa.

Hired in late January, Criner was previously the head coach at Boise State for seven seasons, and won the Division I-AA title in 1980.

== Schedule ==
| Date | Time | Opponent | Site | TV | Result | Attendance | Source |
|---|---|---|---|---|---|---|---|
| September 10 | 2:20 pm | No. 16 Iowa* | Cyclone Stadium; Ames, IA (rivalry) | ABC | L 10–51 | 54,066 | |
| September 17 | 7:00 pm | at Vanderbilt* | Vanderbilt Stadium; Nashville, TN | | L 26–29 | 41,165 | |
| September 24 | 1:30 pm | Colorado State* | Cyclone Stadium; Ames, IA | | W 21–17 | 49,817 | |
| October 1 | 1:30 pm | New Mexico State* | Cyclone Stadium; Ames, IA | | L 17–24 | 47,703 | |
| October 8 | 1:30 pm | Kansas | Cyclone Stadium; Ames, IA | | W 38–35 | 48,125 | |
| October 15 | 1:30 pm | Colorado^{†} | Cyclone Stadium; Ames, IA | | W 22–10 | 49,311 | |
| October 22 | 1:30 pm | at No. 16 Oklahoma | Oklahoma Memorial Stadium; Norman, OK | | L 11–49 | 75,008 | |
| October 29 | 1:30 pm | Missouri | Cyclone Stadium; Ames, IA (rivalry) | | L 18–41 | 49,404 | |
| November 5 | 1:30 pm | at No. 1 Nebraska | Memorial Stadium; Lincoln, NE (rivalry) | | L 29–72 | 76,326 | |
| November 12 | 1:30 pm | at Kansas State | KSU Stadium; Manhattan, KS (rivalry) | | W 49–27 | 24,300 | |
| November 19 | 1:00 pm | Oklahoma State | Cyclone Stadium; Ames, IA | | L 7–30 | 46,517 | |
*Non-conference game; ^{†}Homecoming; Rankings from AP Poll released prior to the game; All times are in Central time

== Game summaries ==
=== Iowa ===
#16 Iowa at Iowa State

| Team | 1 | 2 | 3 | 4 | Total |
|---|---|---|---|---|---|
| • Hawkeyes | 17 | 14 | 6 | 14 | 51 |
| Cyclones | 0 | 3 | 0 | 7 | 10 |

- Date: September 10
- Location: Cyclone Stadium, Ames, Iowa
- Game attendance: 54,066
- TV announcers (ABC): Curt Gowdy and Lee Grosscup

Scoring summary
| 1 | | IOWA | Granger 24-yard pass from Long (Nichol kick) | Iowa 7–0 |
| 1 | | IOWA | Nichol 42-yard field goal | Iowa 10–0 |
| 1 | | IOWA | Gill 31-yard run (Nichol kick) | Iowa 17–0 |
| 2 | | IOWA | Gill 2-yard run (Nichol kick) | Iowa 24–0 |
| 2 | | ISU | Bachrodt 36-yard field goal | Iowa 24–3 |
| 2 | | IOWA | Gill 1-yard run (Nichol kick) | Iowa 31–3 |
| 3 | | IOWA | Long 2-yard run (kick failed) | Iowa 37–3 |
| 4 | | IOWA | Gill 3-yard run (Nichol kick) | Iowa 44–3 |
| 4 | | IOWA | Jackson 6-yard run (Nichol kick) | Iowa 51–3 |
| 4 | 0:58 | ISU | Posey 65-yard pass from Hood (Bachrodt kick) | Iowa 51–10 |

=== At Oklahoma ===
Iowa State at #16 Oklahoma

| Team | 1 | 2 | 3 | 4 | Total |
|---|---|---|---|---|---|
| Cyclones | 3 | 0 | 0 | 8 | 11 |
| • Sooners | 14 | 21 | 7 | 7 | 49 |

- Date: Saturday, October 22
- Location: Oklahoma Memorial Stadium • Norman, Oklahoma
- Game attendance: 75,008

Scoring summary
| 1 | Iowa St | Bachrodt 34-yard field goal | Iowa St 3-0 |
| 1 | Oklahoma | Tillman 2-yard run (Lashar kick) | Oklahoma 7-3 |
| 1 | Oklahoma | Bradley 19-yard run (Lashar kick) | Oklahoma 14-3 |
| 2 | Oklahoma | Ledbetter 13-yard run (Lashar kick) | Oklahoma 21-3 |
| 2 | Oklahoma | Johnson 2-yard run (Lashar kick) | Oklahoma 28-3 |
| 2 | Oklahoma | Tillman 16-yard pass from Clopton (Lashar kick) | Oklahoma 35-3 |
| 3 | Oklahoma | Case 67-yard interception return (Lashar kick) | Oklahoma 42-3 |
| 4 | Iowa St | Wodka 2-yard pass from Archer (Jacobs pass from Archer) | Oklahoma 42-11 |
| 4 | Oklahoma | Clopton 1-yard run (Lashar kick) | Oklahoma 49-11 |

=== At Nebraska ===
Iowa State at #1 Nebraska

| Team | 1 | 2 | 3 | 4 | Total |
|---|---|---|---|---|---|
| Cyclones | 0 | 14 | 7 | 8 | 29 |
| • Cornhuskers | 14 | 21 | 10 | 27 | 72 |

- Date: November 5
- Location: Memorial Stadium, Lincoln, Nebraska
- Game attendance: 76,326

== Roster ==
- QB David Archer
