= Bret Clark =

American football player (born 1961)

No. 10, 28
- Position: Safety

Personal information
- Born: February 24, 1961 (age 65); Nebraska City, Nebraska, U.S.
- Listed height: 6 ft 3 in (1.91 m)
- Listed weight: 198 lb (90 kg)

Career information
- High school: Nebraska City
- College: Nebraska
- NFL draft: 1985: 7th round, 191st overall pick

Career history
- Tampa Bay Bandits (1985); Atlanta Falcons (1986–1988)

Awards and highlights
- First-team All-American (1984); 2× First-team All-Big Eight (1983, 1984)

Career NFL statistics
- Interceptions: 9
- Sacks: 1
- Fumble recoveries: 3
- Stats at Pro Football Reference

Bret Clark (born February 24, 1961) is an American former professional football player who was a defensive back for the Atlanta Falcons of the National Football League (NFL). He played college football for the Nebraska Cornhuskers, earning first-team All-American honors as a senior in 1984. After college, he played one season with the United States Football League (USFL)'s Tampa Bay Bandits, then started at safety for three seasons in the NFL with the Falcons. A serious and chronic knee injury ended his professional football career in 1988.

Clark is also known for effectively ending the existence of the Tampa Bay Bandits. Clark took the Bandits to arbitration over back pay owed to him. While Clark won the case, the Bandits did not have the funds available to pay him back, so a judge ordered that the team's remaining assets be confiscated to repay the debt to Clark.

== Early life ==
Bret Clark was born in Nebraska City, Nebraska to Kenneth and Alice Clark. He was an all-state defensive back at Nebraska City High School and, upon graduating in 1980, accepted an athletic scholarship to play for the Nebraska Cornhuskers under coach Tom Osborne.

== College career ==
Clark spent one year on Nebraska's freshman squad and one year as a redshirt. He received increasing playing time during his sophomore year of 1982 and led the Cornhusker secondary in tackles. Clark was a starter during his junior and senior seasons and won many accolades. He was a consensus All-Big Eight Conference performer in 1983 and 1984, and was listed as an All-American by several publications in 1984. At the conclusion of his college career, he held Nebraska records for passes broken up in a season, passes broken up in a career, and career unassisted tackles by a defensive back.

== Professional career ==
=== USFL ===
Clark was selected by the Los Angeles Raiders in the seventh round of the 1985 NFL draft but chose to accept a $1 million contract offer from the USFL's Tampa Bay Bandits. Later, Bandits coach Steve Spurrier questioned whether Clark was worth that much. Spurrier and other Bandits insiders tried to get the contract voided, believing that owner John F. Bassett's judgment was impaired when he hammered out the deal. Bassett was suffering from terminal brain cancer at the time, and Spurrier and others believed the unusually large contract was evidence that he was no longer of sound mind.

Clark played in seven games with the Bandits during the USFL's final season, mostly as a nickel back and on special teams.

The contract came back to haunt the Bandits in August 1986. In March, Clark took the Bandits to arbitration seeking $159,980 in back pay, and won. The decision was reaffirmed on May 26. By then, a dying Bassett had sold controlling interest in the Bandits to minority partner Lee Scarfone. However, Scarfone had gone into considerable debt to make the purchase, and had depleted most of his assets in the process. As a result, the Bandits did not have the assets available to reimburse Clark. On August 4--the same day that the USFL suspended operations—federal judge Elizabeth Kovachevich placed a $159,980 lien on the franchise and ordered that the team's remaining assets, including everything from weight-lifting equipment to office furniture to uniforms to souvenirs and memorabilia from the team store, be confiscated to pay the debt. The seizure did not satisfy Clark, who was upset that the assets were not liquid. This move effectively ended any chance of the Bandits returning to the field, though the league itself did not officially cease to exist until 1988.

=== NFL ===
The Atlanta Falcons traded their fourth round draft pick in the 1986 NFL draft to the Raiders for the rights to Clark, and he signed a contract with the team soon thereafter. As a member of the Falcons, Clark returned to the Bandits' home field of Tampa Stadium for an August 1986 preseason game against the Tampa Bay Buccaneers just days after the conclusion of his lawsuit against the Bandits. Accordingly, he was booed by Tampa football fans for his role in finishing off the city's other pro football team.

Clark played three years for Atlanta, mostly as a starting safety. A chronic knee injury required surgery during the 1988 season and landed him on injured reserve. The injury effectively ended his football career, as the Falcons chose not to offer him a contract for the following season.

In 1998, Clark wrote a book about his experiences entitled "Movin' On: My Life in the NFL".
