= 1983 Kansas Jayhawks football team =

American college football season

1983 Kansas Jayhawks football
- Conference: Big Eight Conference
- Record: 4–6–1 (2–5 Big 8)
- Head coach: Mike Gottfried (1st season)
- Captains: Mike Arbanas; Paul Fairchild; Frank Seurer; E. J. Jones; Eddie Simmons
- Home stadium: Memorial Stadium

1983 Big Eight Conference football standings
	Conf.					Overall
Team	W		L		T	W		L		T
No. 2 Nebraska $	7	–	0	–	0	12	–	1	–	0
Missouri	5	–	2	–	0	7	–	5	–	0
Oklahoma	5	–	2	–	0	8	–	4	–	0
Oklahoma State	3	–	4	–	0	8	–	4	–	0
Iowa State	3	–	4	–	0	4	–	7	–	0
Kansas	2	–	5	–	0	4	–	6	–	1
Colorado	2	–	5	–	0	4	–	7	–	0
Kansas State	1	–	6	–	0	3	–	8	–	0
$ – Conference champion; Rankings from AP Poll

The 1983 Kansas Jayhawks football team represented the University of Kansas in the Big Eight Conference during the 1983 NCAA Division I-A football season. In their first season under head coach Mike Gottfried, the Jayhawks compiled a 4–6–1 record (2–5 against conference opponents), finished in seventh place in the conference, and were outscored by opponents by a combined total of 320 to 296. They played their home games at Memorial Stadium in Lawrence, Kansas.

The Jayhawks upset 10th ranked USC in Los Angeles 26–20 in what remains their only game against USC in school history.

The team's statistical leaders included Frank Seurer with 2,789 passing yards, Kerwin Bell with 498 rushing yards, and Bob Johnson with 1,154 receiving yards. Seurer, Mike Arbanas, Paul Fairchild, E. J. Jones, and Eddie Simmons were the team captains.

== Schedule ==
Date	Opponent	Site	Result	Attendance	Source
September 3	Northern Illinois*	Memorial Stadium; Lawrence, KS	L 34–37	26,000	
September 10	at TCU*	Amon G. Carter Stadium; Fort Worth, TX	T 16–16	27,244	
September 17	Wichita State*	Memorial Stadium; Lawrence, KS	W 57–6	36,500	
September 24	at No. 10 USC*	Los Angeles Memorial Coliseum; Los Angeles, CA	W 26–20	49,255	
October 8	at Iowa State	Cyclone Stadium; Ames, IA	L 35–38	48,125	
October 15	Kansas State	Memorial Stadium; Lawrence, KS (rivalry)	W 31–3	49,300	
October 22	Oklahoma State	Memorial Stadium; Lawrence, KS	L 10–27	31,300	
October 29	at No. 14 Oklahoma	Oklahoma Memorial Stadium; Norman, OK	L 14–45	75,008	
November 5	Colorado	Memorial Stadium; Lawrence, KS	L 23–34	28,600	
November 12	at No. 1 Nebraska	Memorial Stadium; Lincoln, NE (rivalry)	L 13–67	76,503	
November 19	No. 19 Missouri^{†}	Memorial Stadium; Lawrence, KS (Border War)	W 37–27	38,400	
*Non-conference game; ^{†}Homecoming; Rankings from AP Poll released prior to the game
