= Todd Frain =

American football player (born 1962)

No. 88, 44
- Position: Tight end

Personal information
- Born: January 31, 1962 (age 64); Council Bluffs, Iowa, U.S.
- Listed height: 6 ft 2 in (1.88 m)
- Listed weight: 240 lb (109 kg)

Career information
- High school: Treynor
- College: Nebraska
- NFL draft: 1986: undrafted

Career history
- Washington Redskins (1986); New England Patriots (1987); New York Jets (1988)*
- * Offseason or practice squad member only

Career NFL statistics
- Receptions: 2
- Receiving yards: 22
- Stats at Pro Football Reference

Todd Leslie Frain (born January 31, 1962) is an American former professional football player who was a tight end in the National Football League (NFL) for the Washington Redskins and the New England Patriots. He played college football for the Nebraska Cornhuskers.
