= 1983 Colorado Buffaloes football team =

American college football season

1983 Colorado Buffaloes football
- Conference: Big Eight Conference
- Record: 4–7 (2–5 Big 8)
- Head coach: Bill McCartney (2nd season)
- Offensive coordinator: Ron Taylor (1st season)
- Offensive scheme: Multiple
- Defensive coordinator: Lou Tepper (1st season)
- Base defense: 3–4
- MVP: Victor Scott
- Captains: Victor Scott; Steve Vogel
- Home stadium: Folsom Field

1983 Big Eight Conference football standings
	Conf.					Overall
Team	W		L		T	W		L		T
No. 2 Nebraska $	7	–	0	–	0	12	–	1	–	0
Missouri	5	–	2	–	0	7	–	5	–	0
Oklahoma	5	–	2	–	0	8	–	4	–	0
Oklahoma State	3	–	4	–	0	8	–	4	–	0
Iowa State	3	–	4	–	0	4	–	7	–	0
Kansas	2	–	5	–	0	4	–	6	–	1
Colorado	2	–	5	–	0	4	–	7	–	0
Kansas State	1	–	6	–	0	3	–	8	–	0
$ – Conference champion; Rankings from AP Poll

The 1983 Colorado Buffaloes football team represented the University of Colorado in the Big Eight Conference during the 1983 NCAA Division I-A football season. Led by second-year head coach Bill McCartney, the Buffaloes finished at 4–7 (2–5 in Big 8, tied for sixth), their fifth consecutive losing season. Home games were played on campus at Folsom Field in Boulder, Colorado.

Colorado revived the dormant intrastate rivalry with Colorado State after 25 years, and posted a winning record after three games for the first time since 1978.

Down by two touchdowns in the season finale, junior quarterback Steve Vogel came off the bench and rallied CU to a 17-point home win over last-place Kansas State to avoid the conference cellar.

== Schedule ==
Date	Opponent	Site	TV	Result	Attendance	Source
September 10	at Michigan State*	Spartan Stadium; East Lansing, MI		L 17–23	56,835	
September 17	Colorado State*	Folsom Field; Boulder, CO (Rocky Mountain Showdown)	KWGN	W 31–3	49,783	
September 24	Oregon State*	Folsom Field; Boulder, CO		W 38–14	33,504	
October 1	Notre Dame*	Folsom Field; Boulder, CO	KWGN	L 3–27	52,692	
October 8	Missouri	Folsom Field; Boulder, CO		L 20–59	37,157	
October 15	at Iowa State	Cyclone Stadium; Ames, IA		L 10–22	49,311	
October 22	at No. 1 Nebraska	Memorial Stadium; Lincoln, NE (rivalry)		L 19–69	76,286	
October 29	Oklahoma State^{†}	Folsom Field; Boulder, CO		L 14–40	36,889	
November 5	at Kansas	Memorial Stadium; Lawrence, KS		W 34–23	28,600	
November 12	at Oklahoma	Oklahoma Memorial Stadium; Norman, OK	KWGN	L 28–41	75,008	
November 19	Kansas State	Folsom Field; Boulder, CO (rivalry)		W 38–21	27,649	
*Non-conference game; ^{†}Homecoming; Rankings from AP Poll released prior to the game

== Awards ==
- TE Dave Hestra
  - All-American Honorable Mention (AP)
  - All-Big Eight
- CB Victor Scott
  - Playboy Preseason All-American
  - All-American Honorable Mention (AP)
  - All-Big Eight
