= Derrick Shepard (wide receiver) =

American football player (1964–1999)

No. 88, 80, 89, 87, 82
- Position: Wide receiver

Personal information
- Born: January 22, 1964; Odessa, Texas, U.S.
- Died: August 4, 1999 (aged 35); Laramie, Wyoming, U.S.
- Listed height: 5 ft 10 in (1.78 m)
- Listed weight: 183 lb (83 kg)

Career information
- High school: Odessa
- College: Oklahoma
- NFL draft: 1987: undrafted

Career history
- Washington Redskins (1987-1988); New Orleans Saints (1989); Dallas Cowboys (1989–1991)

Awards and highlights
- National champion (1985)

Career NFL statistics
- Receptions: 20
- Receiving yards: 304
- Receiving touchdowns: 1
- Stats at Pro Football Reference

Derrick Lathell Shepard (January 22, 1964 – August 4, 1999) was an American professional football player who was a wide receiver in the National Football League (NFL) for the Washington Redskins, New Orleans Saints, and Dallas Cowboys. He played college football for the Oklahoma Sooners.

== Early life ==
Shepard attended Odessa High School, where he was a wishbone quarterback. As a senior, he led his team in rushing.

He walked on at the University of Oklahoma, where he was converted to a wide receiver as a freshman. As a sophomore, he was named a starter and had his best season with caught 27 passes for 392 yards and 3 touchdowns. This included a 73-yard touchdown reception in the fourth quarter against Oklahoma State University, with his team down 3–20 in a game they came back to win 21–20.

In 1985, he posted 15 receptions for 281 yards and 3 touchdowns, including a career-long 77-yard touchdown catch against Iowa State University. He was also a part of the national championship team. He finished his career with 70 receptions (tied for second in school history), 1,090 receiving yards (fifth in school history) and 596 punt return yards (fourth in school history).

The school's Derrick Shepard Most Inspirational Walk-On Player of the Year award is named in his honor.

== Professional career ==
=== Washington Redskins ===
Shepard was signed as an undrafted free agent by the Washington Redskins after the 1987 NFL draft. He was waived on August 17. After the players went on a strike on the third week of the season, those contests were canceled (reducing the 16 game season to 15) and the NFL decided that the games would be played with replacement players. Shepard was re-signed to be a part of the Redskins replacement team, that was given the mock name "Deadskins" by the media. He returned a punt 73 yards in the fourth game against the St. Louis Cardinals. He contributed to the team being undefeated in the three replacement contests, including an upset win against the Dallas Cowboys. On November 28, he was released again and could not be a part of the eventual Super Bowl XXII winning team.

He was re-signed in the spring of 1988. He was limited to 5 games due to a hip injury and a concussion that forced him to spend time on the injured reserve list. He played in 7 games in 2 seasons, mainly on special teams, failing to register a single reception.

=== New Orleans Saints ===
On March 7, 1989, he signed with the New Orleans Saints as a Plan B free agent. He played in 4 games and returned a punt 56 yards for a touchdown in the season opener against the Dallas Cowboys. He was released on October 3.

=== Dallas Cowboys ===
On October 4, 1989, he was claimed off waivers by the Dallas Cowboys. He was named the starter at wide receiver in the seventh game against the Kansas City Chiefs, after Michael Irvin was lost for the season to a knee injury. He started 8 of the final 10 contests, missing the twelfth game with a knee injury he suffered against the Los Angeles Rams. He registered 18 receptions for 268 yards and one touchdown. His best game came against the Phoenix Cardinals, posting 4 receptions for 92 yards and one touchdown.

He was cut on September 2, 1990, and was later re-signed on September 5, but a hamstring injury forced him to the injured reserve list on September 8. On November 2, he was activated to be the team's punt returner.

On August 26, 1991, he was released and re-signed on September 10 to return both punts and kickoffs. On October 29, he was placed on the injured reserve list with a sprained right ankle. He was released on August 31, 1992, because the team was looking for more speed from the wide receiver position.

== Personal life ==
After his playing career was over, he became a graduate assistant at the University of Oklahoma, before moving on to University of Wyoming, where he was going to be the wide receivers assistant coach. On August 4, 1999, he died from a sudden heart attack he suffered while playing racquetball.

His son Sterling, along with his older brothers Darrell and Woodie, also played college football at the University of Oklahoma.
