= Danny Bradley =

American football player (born 1963)

No. 86
- Position: Running back

Personal information
- Born: March 2, 1963 (age 63); Pine Bluff, Arkansas, U.S.
- Listed height: 5 ft 9 in (1.75 m)
- Listed weight: 175 lb (79 kg)

Career information
- High school: Pine Bluff
- College: Oklahoma
- NFL draft: 1985: 7th round, 189th overall pick

Career history
- Los Angeles Rams (1985); Detroit Lions (1987)

Awards and highlights
- Big Eight Offensive Player of the Year (1984); First-team All-Big Eight (1984)

Career NFL statistics
- Receptions: 7
- Receiving yards: 50
- Touchdowns: 2
- Stats at Pro Football Reference

Danny Louis Bradley (born March 2, 1963) is an American former professional football player who was a running back in the National Football League (NFL). He played college football for the Oklahoma Sooners.

== College career ==
Bradley played quarterback at the University of Oklahoma from 1981 to 1984. He was the Big Eight Offensive Player of the Year and MVP in 1984.

== Professional career ==
Bradley was selected by the Los Angeles Rams in the seventh round of the 1985 NFL draft. He played for the Detroit Lions for three games in 1987. He became the first African-American front office executive with the Dallas Cowboys at the age of 32.

== Education and family ==
Bradley earned a bachelor's degree in political science in 1988 from the University of Oklahoma.

Bradley is also the father of NFL wide receiver Mark Bradley formerly of the Chicago Bears, Kansas City Chiefs, and Tampa Bay Buccaneers. Mark also attended the University of Oklahoma. The two recently authored a biography titled ("1nsepara6le") Faith-Family-Fatherhood.
