= Lynsi Snyder =

American businesswoman and heiress

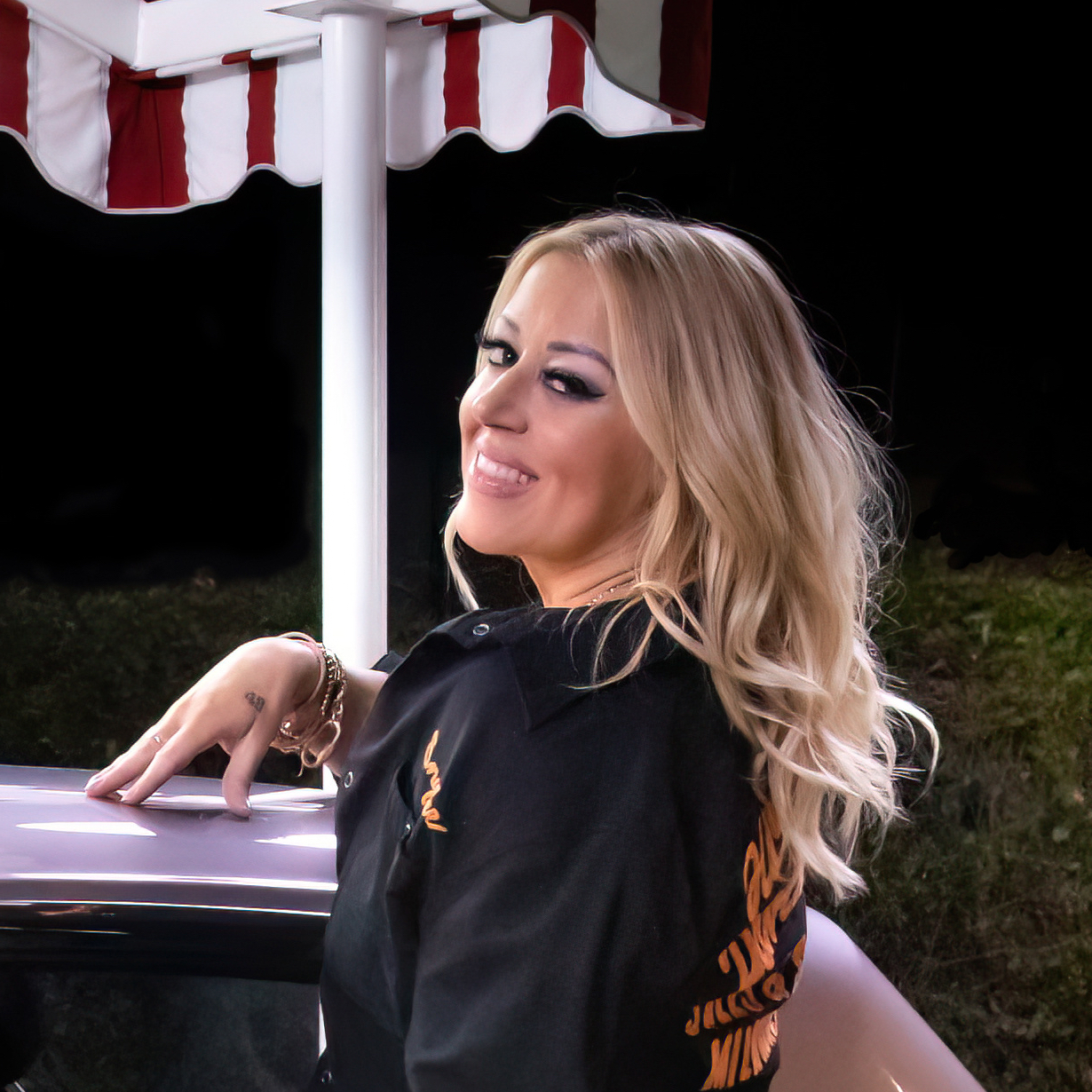
- Snyder in 2023
- Born: Lynsi Lavelle Snyder; May 5, 1982 (age 44); San Dimas, California, U.S.
- Education: Citrus College (no degree)
- Occupation: Businesswoman
- Title: President and owner of In-N-Out Burger
- Spouses: Jeremiah Seawell (m. 2000; div. 2003) Richard Martinez (m. 2004; div. 2011) Val Torres Jr. (m. 2011; div. 2014) Sean Ellingson (m. 2014)
- Children: 4
- Parent(s): Guy Snyder (father); Lynda Snyder (mother)
- Relatives: Harry Snyder (grandfather); Esther Snyder (grandmother); Rich Snyder (uncle)

Lynsi Lavelle Snyder-Ellingson (previously Seawell, Martinez, and Torres; born May 5, 1982) is an American billionaire businesswoman, the owner and heiress of the In-N-Out Burger company. She is the only child of Lynda and H. Guy Snyder and the only grandchild of Harry and Esther Snyder, who founded In-N-Out in 1948.

According to the Bloomberg Billionaires Index, in 2012, Snyder was the youngest American female billionaire. As the sole beneficiary of family trusts, she received control of the company's stock in its entirety on her 35th birthday, becoming the sole owner. In 2025, Snyder ranked No. 153 on the annual Forbes 400 list of the wealthiest Americans, with a net worth of $8.7 billion.

== Early life ==
Snyder was born in San Dimas, California, to Lynda Lou (née Wilson) and Guy Snyder, and spent her early childhood years at her parents' home in Glendora, California. She is of Dutch descent on her father's side. She has two older half-sisters.

By the late 1980s, Snyder and her parents moved to Shingletown, California. While Snyder's uncle Rich Snyder successfully ran and expanded In-N-Out's business operations, Snyder's father struggled personally. Throughout her childhood, he was often in rehab centers and hospitals due to his ongoing drug addiction. When Snyder was 12, her parents separated due to her father's extramarital affair; their divorce was finalized in January 1997.

In 1993, Snyder's uncle Rich flew to Northern California to see her in a school play. The following day, he attended the opening of In-N-Out store No. 93 in Fresno, California. On his return home, he died in a plane crash. In 1999, Snyder's father died of congestive heart failure as a result of his excessive prescription drug use.

Snyder graduated from Shingletown Christian Academy, a private high school that her parents helped found, before relocating to Southern California with her first husband. In the early 2000s, Snyder took auto mechanics, engine performance, and diagnostics classes at Citrus College, her local community college.

== Career ==
At age 17, she was hired at a new In-N-Out store in Redding, California, where she leafed lettuce, peeled potatoes, and sliced onions. Only the store managers knew of Snyder's true identity; the other workers were initially unaware of her family ties to the company, due to Snyder's desire to be treated "normally." In the 2000s, Snyder first took a job in In-N-Out's corporate merchandising department and subsequently rotated through other departments as she learned the business.

During 2006, Snyder and In-N-Out were embroiled in a bitter lawsuit with Rich Boyd, a former company executive. Boyd was fired for allegedly misusing company funds, but he claimed that Snyder, and then-vice president Mark Taylor, were trying to oust the elderly Esther Snyder from the company. Both Lynsi Snyder and Mark Taylor denied the claims, with Snyder saying the lawsuit "contains outright lies and awful inaccuracies to try to cover his own errors. By far, the most upsetting is his fabrication about the relationship between me and my gramma." The lawsuit was settled out of court in May 2006, less than three months before Esther's death.

On January 1, 2010, Snyder became the sixth president of In-N-Out, succeeding her brother-in-law, Mark Taylor, who was promoted to become the company's chief operating officer. She occupies the same leadership position that her grandfather Harry (1948–1976), uncle Rich (1976–1993), father Guy (1994–1999), and grandmother Esther (2000–2006) previously held. Before Snyder became president of In-N-Out Burger, a taped message from her was broadcast to all company associates letting them know about the transition and the future of the company. Esther's signature was finally replaced with Lynsi's on associates' paychecks in 2009, three years after Esther's death.

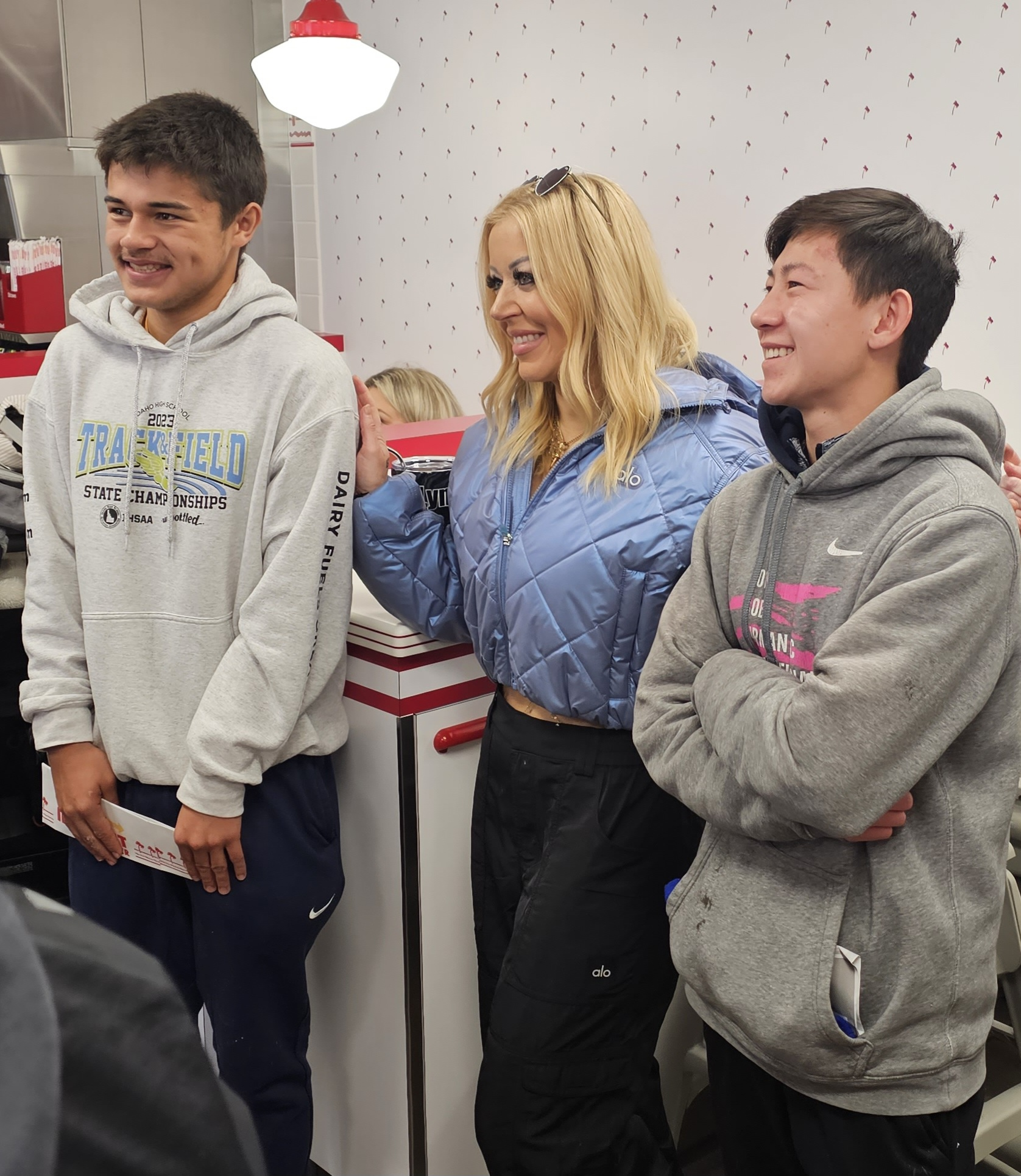
Snyder with customers at the December 2023 opening of In-N-Out store No. 400 in Meridian, Idaho

During her presidency, the number of In-N-Out locations has nearly doubled, from fewer than 250 stores to 400 as of December 2023, and the company now operates in eight states. She has also continued the tradition started by her uncle Rich of citing Bible verses on In-N-Out packaging, adding Proverbs 24:16 to the French fry containers, Luke 6:35 to the coffee cups and Isaiah 9:6 to the holiday cups.

In 2021, the Orange County Business Journal featured Snyder in the OC50, the annual listing of the 50 most influential executives in Orange County, and she was named the Los Angeles Business Journal 2021 Women's Business Leadership Award's CEO of the Year.

In 2021, her 96% approval rating on Glassdoor made her the highest-rated female CEO in the United States.

In 2023, Snyder released her first book,The Ins-N-Outs of In-N-Out Burger: The Inside Story of California's First Drive-Through and How it Became a Beloved Cultural Icon..

== Wealth ==
Snyder was first ranked on the Bloomberg Billionaires Index in 2013, based on an In-N-Out valuation of $1.1 billion. Bloomberg also noted that she was the youngest female billionaire in North America. That same year, she ranked No. 93 on Maxim's annual Hot 100 list.

Snyder took ownership of her father's share of In-N-Out (50% of the company) on her 30th birthday, and inherited the balance of the company that was not already in trust for her when her grandmother Esther died. In 2006, Snyder's inheritance had been valued at $450 million, but its value increased exponentially in subsequent years, as the company continued to grow. Snyder gained full control of the company when she turned 35.

In recent years, under Snyder's leadership, In-N-Out has gradually begun to expand at a more aggressive pace than before; in 2022, the company's estimated annual revenue topped $1.8 billion. According to Forbes, Snyder's personal net worth more than doubled in the five years between 2018 and 2023, increasing from $3 billion to $6.7 billion.

== Politics ==
During the first half of 2025, Snyder donated $2 million to MAGA Inc., a super PAC that supports Donald Trump. During her presidency, In-N-Out Burger and affiliated entities have donated $275,000 to the California Republican Party and $750,000 to the Congressional Leadership Fund, a super PAC dedicated to electing Republicans to the U.S. House of Representatives. The company has also donated $180,000 to Californians for Jobs and a Strong Economy, a Super PAC dedicated to electing moderate and pro-business Democrats to the U.S. Senate.

== Philanthropy ==
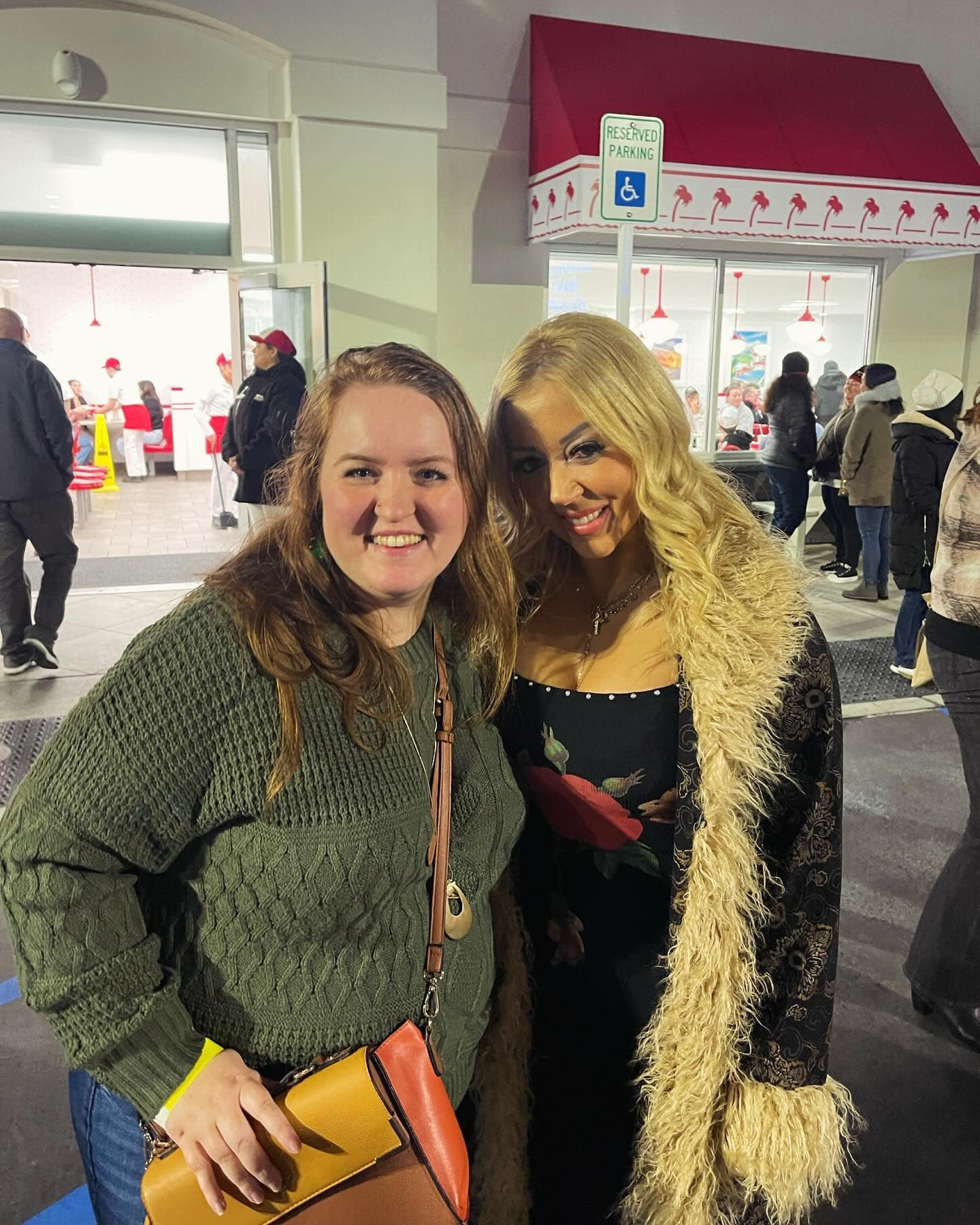
Snyder (right) in 2023

Snyder co-founded Slave 2 Nothing, a non-profit corporation that exists to create, educate and assist in solutions to eliminate human trafficking and help individuals and their families to experience complete freedom and healing from substance addiction, with her husband Sean Ellingson in 2016. The foundation raises money and directs it to organizations that combat both substance abuse and human trafficking. In 2021, it made 96 grants totaling $1.7 million to nonprofit organizations in the seven states where In-N-Out has restaurants.

Lynsi and Sean also co-founded HIS EYES Foundation to fight homelessness in 2025

She is President of the In-N-Out Burger Foundation, which supports abused and neglected children, and was founded by her uncle Rich Snyder, grandmother Esther Snyder and mom Lynda Snyder.

In 2023, Snyder and In-N-Out made a significant financial contribution to Biola University in memory of Esther Snyder. The gift helped fund the creation of a new $92 million, 52,100-square-foot studio for the university's film students, and Biola subsequently renamed its film school the Snyder School of Cinema and Media Arts in the family's honor. While the size of Snyder's donation was not disclosed, it was the largest in the school's 115-year history, surpassing a $12 million gift in 2015.

== Personal life ==
=== Marriages and children ===
Snyder has been married four times and has four children. She began dating her first husband, Jeremiah Seawell, when she was 14. They married in the summer of 2000, shortly after her 18th birthday. The couple separated within two years; their divorce was finalized in 2003.

In 2002, Snyder began dating former In-N-Out employee Richard Martinez. They married in 2004 and welcomed fraternal twins, a boy and a girl, in November 2006. They divorced in 2011.

While separated from Martinez in 2010, Snyder began dating race car driver Val Torres Jr. She gave birth to their son in July 2011, and the couple married after her divorce from Martinez was finalized later that year. They divorced in 2014.

Snyder married Sean Ellingson, brother of the late actor Evan Ellingson, in 2014. She gave birth to their son, her fourth child, in late 2014.

=== Religion ===
According to an interview in Decision magazine, Snyder became a born-again Christian as a child but drifted away from her faith following the end of her first marriage, when she slipped into a two-year-long stretch of drug and alcohol abuse. She would later say the film The Passion of the Christ drew her back to God.

=== Hobbies ===
Like her father, Snyder has been an avid drag racing fan and member of the NHRA. She regularly competes in drag racing events, though has been on a break in recent years. In 2015, she was featured on an episode of Jay Leno's Garage, where she showed off a modified '41 Willys that was previously owned by her late father.

In addition to the Willys, Snyder owns many other performance cars. Some of her vehicles include a 2015 Dodge Challenger SRT Hellcat, a 1969 Dodge Dart, a 1970 Chevrolet Chevelle SS and a customized 1987 Chevrolet Blazer.

Snyder is founder of the In-N-Out "company band," .48 Special. She plays bass and sings and her husband Sean Ellingson plays guitar. All the other members of the band are from In-N-Out management, and their rehearsals are built around their work schedules. Snyder is also an aerialist, fire eater and dancer, regularly performing at .48 Special performances during In-N-Out events.

Described as an "outdoorsy jock" by Orange Coast, Snyder was at one point training for an amateur boxing career. She enjoys playing multiple sports, including soccer and football, and is a lifelong fan of the Las Vegas Raiders NFL team.

=== Residence ===
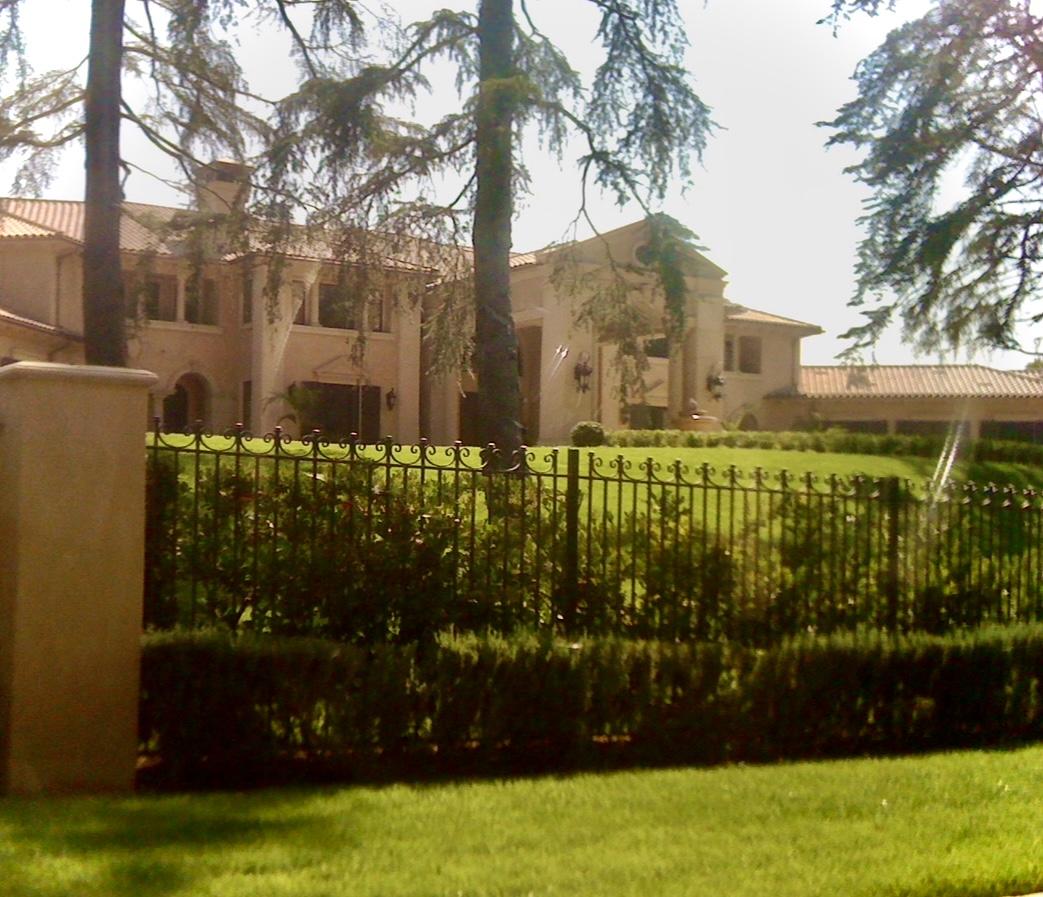
Snyder's former home in Bradbury, California

In August 2012, Snyder reportedly purchased a 7-bedroom, 16-bathroom mansion with 16,600 square feet (1,540 m^{2}) of interior space in Bradbury, California, from Texas Rangers third baseman Adrián Beltré for a sum in excess of US$17 million. She moved from the home in 2020 and sold it in 2021.

Snyder still works primarily out of the Baldwin Park office, home of In-N-Out University and formerly company headquarters, rather than the Irvine corporate headquarters because it is closer to her main residence.

In 2007, Snyder purchased her grandmother Esther's longtime Glendora home, which author Stacy Perman described as "a ranch house shaded by oak trees and fronted by a white fence." According to Perman, though Snyder has never lived in the house, there was "speculation that [Lynsi] might convert it into a church." As of December 2023, Snyder still owned the property.

=== Privacy and kidnapping attempts ===
In 2010, Snyder has been described as "media shy" and not seeking public attention.

In her January 2014 interview with Orange Coast, Snyder said that she has been the target of at least two kidnapping attempts. In the wake of these attempts, she deliberately kept herself out of the public eye for the safety of her family, she said. The first kidnapping attempt occurred when she was still a high school student in Shingletown; the second took place when she was 21 years old in Baldwin Park, near the local In-N-Out distribution center.
