= Bloomberg Billionaires Index =

Ranking of the world's 500 richest people

- List of The World's Top 500 billionaires, ranked in order of net worth
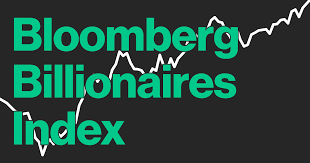

Publication details
- Publication: Bloomberg L.P.
- First published: March 11, 2012
- Latest update: July 14, 2026

Current list details
- Wealthiest: Elon Musk (as of July 13, 2026)
- Net worth (1st): ▼US$876 billion (as of July 13, 2026)
- Number of billionaires: 500
- Total list net worth value: ▲US$11.9 trillion (as of December 30, 2025)

The Bloomberg Billionaires Index, launched in March 2012, is a daily ranking of the world's 500 richest people based on their net worth. It features a profile of each billionaire, and includes a tool that allows users to compare the fortunes of multiple billionaires. The index is updated every day at the close of trading in New York.

== Rankings ==
The rankings are updated on days on which the US stock market is open; the update is made after the closing bell of each New York trading day and so is based on Eastern Standard Time.

Legend
Icon	Description
Steady	Has not changed from the previous trading day.
▲	Has increased from the previous trading day.
▼	Has decreased from the previous trading day.

10 richest billionaires covered by the Bloomberg Billionaires Index as of July 13, 2026
No.	Name	Net worth (USD)	Age	Nation of origin	Source(s) of wealth
1	Elon Musk	$876 billion ▼	55	South Africa	Tesla; SpaceX; X Corp. xAI; The Boring Company; Neuralink
2	Larry Page	$301 billion ▼	53	United States	Alphabet Inc.
3	Sergey Brin	$280 billion ▼	53	United States	Alphabet Inc.
4	Jeff Bezos	$269 billion ▲	62	United States	Amazon; Blue Origin
5	Mark Zuckerberg	$233 billion ▼	42	United States	Meta Platforms
6	Michael Dell	$223 billion ▼	61	United States	Dell Technologies; Broadcom
7	Larry Ellison	$187 billion ▼	82	United States	Oracle
8	Jensen Huang	$169 billion ▼	63	Taiwan	Nvidia
9	Bernard Arnault	$163 billion ▲	77	France	LVMH
10	Warren Buffett	$148 billion ▲	96	United States	Berkshire Hathaway

== Launch and background ==
The Bloomberg Billionaires Index is a daily ranking of the world's billionaires published by Bloomberg News since March 2012. It tracks the 500 wealthiest people in the world. The ranking was designed to provide a more transparent and accountable presentation of the world's biggest personal fortunes. At first, the index only tracked the 20 richest people in the world, and then expanded to 100, 200, 400 and later 500 in October 2016.

At its launch in 2012, Mexican telecommunications tycoon Carlos Slim was in the top spot, with an estimated $65.8 billion net worth. Beginning in May 2013, Microsoft co-founder Bill Gates was the world's top billionaire. Amazon CEO Jeff Bezos and Spanish fashion retailer Amancio Ortega both saw a large increase in their respective net worths during 2016 and 2017 and challenged Gates for the number one spot. Bezos eventually surpassed him in 2018 and by 2021 was surpassed furthermore by Elon Musk, who was considered the richest person on Earth until mid-December 2022 when Tesla's share price fell and Bernard Arnault became the wealthiest person in the world. On May 31, 2023, Elon Musk once again became the wealthiest man on Earth as Tesla's share price rose, while the share price of LVMH, which influenced Bernard Arnault's wealth, fell due to a decline in LVMH's sales. On July 3, 2025, Bill Gates dropped off from the top 10 richest for the first time in the Bloomberg Billionaires Index's list, after being in the list since the first publication of the index. On June 12, 2026, Elon Musk became the first person to achieve a trillionaire status since the index's publication with a net worth of $1.11 trillion. This milestone occurred during the record-breaking IPO of his rocket company SpaceX, of which Musk holds an approximate 42% equity stake in the firm.

The Index reports on hidden wealth and has uncovered more than 400 hidden billionaires since its founding. Bloomberg Billionaires founding editor Matthew Miller said in 2013 that hidden billionaires are identified by "making sure that we have accounted for all the companies in closely-held assets around the world". Some of the billionaires the index has uncovered includes JPMorgan Chase chairman Jamie Dimon, In-N-Out Burger president Lynsi Snyder-Ellingson, Ferrari Motors heir Piero Ferrari and the chairman of BIEL Crystal Manufactory Yeung Kin-Man.

While reporting on hidden billionaires, the index provides coverage of and attempts to put in perspective the wealth of the world's richest people, such as former Queen of the United Kingdom Elizabeth II and current president of the United States Donald Trump.

== Methodology ==
The index offers a dynamic look at the wealth controlled by the world's richest people while trying to offer a new perspective on how the media views and tracks the movement of that wealth. The index "is built to change daily depending on stock fluctuations and economic/company news."

To calculate individuals' wealth, the index relies on a mixture of public and private data, tracking stock prices and publicly disclosed holdings as well as calculated values for private companies using derived or reported information that is valued using live comparisons to public competitors.

The valuations are converted to U.S. dollars at current exchange rates and do not include assumptions about personal debt.

Journalists have noted that the detailed methodology used for the index is more transparent than the "somewhat vaguer" calculation behind other lists. "The Bloomberg listers say their estimates may be more accurate than the competition's because they have better data and reporting (from Bloomberg terminals and its reporting staff)."

== Data visualization ==
The full index is available online on the Bloomberg Terminal. There are tools to compare the fortunes of multiple billionaires, track the billionaires whose assets change the most, and analyze the one-year performance of individual billionaires or billionaires grouped by industry, region or nation.

Each billionaire's profile includes explanations of asset valuations and more details about each fortune.

== See also ==
- The World's Billionaires
