= Evan Ellingson =

American actor (1988–2023)

- Born: Evan Taylor Ellingson; July 1, 1988
- Died: November 5, 2023 (aged 35); Fontana, California, U.S.
- Occupation: Actor
- Years active: 2001–2010
- Notable work: Complete Savages; My Sister's Keeper; CSI: Miami
- Children: 1

Evan Taylor Ellingson (July 1, 1988 – November 5, 2023) was an American actor.

Ellingson made his acting debut in 2001 with roles in the TV movie Living in Fear and General Hospital. From 2007 to 2010, he played the role of Kyle Harmon in CSI: Miami. He played the role of Jesse Fitzgerald in the 2009 film My Sister's Keeper.

== Personal life and death ==
Evan Ellingson was born July 1, 1988, and grew up in La Verne, California, with three brothers. His brother Sean is married to In N Out Burger CEO Lynsi Snyder.

Ellingson is reported to have started abusing drugs at age 19, following the death of his older brother from a heroin overdose. He sought treatment for drug addiction in 2021.

Ellingson died from a suspected fentanyl overdose in Fontana, California, on November 5, 2023. He was 35. According to Ellingson's father, he was residing in a sober–living home at the time of his death. The San Bernardino County Sheriff's Department later announced that Ellingson's death resulted from an accidental fentanyl overdose.

== Filmography ==
Ellingson's roles
Year	Title	Role	Ref.
2001	Living in Fear	Young Chuck	
2001	General Hospital	Young Luke Spencer	
2001	The Gristle	Alden Boy	
2001–02	Titus	Young Christopher	
2000–02	Mad TV	Church Camp Boy; Cody Gifford	
2002	That Was Then		
2002	Time Changer	Roger	
2003	Rules of the Game	Adam	
2004–05	Complete Savages	Kyle Savage	
2005	Bones	David Cook	
2005	Confession	Benjamin Givens	
2006	Bondage	Mark Edwards	
2006	Letters from Iwo Jima	Kid Marine	
2007	24	Josh Bauer	
2007	State of Mind	David Carson	
2007	Walk the Talk	Roy Naybor	
2009	My Sister's Keeper	Jesse Fitzgerald	
2007–10	CSI: Miami	Kyle Harmon	
