= Guy Snyder (businessman) =

American businessman (1951–1999)

- Born: Harry Guy Snyder; February 22, 1951; Covina, California, U.S.
- Died: December 3, 1999 (aged 48); Lancaster, California, U.S.
- Education: Bonita High School
- Known for: Former president of In-N-Out Burger and member of the Snyder family
- Spouse(s): Lynda Lou Perkins (m. 1981; div. 1997) Kathy Touché (m. 1997; div. 1999)
- Children: Lynsi Snyder

Harry Guy Snyder (February 22, 1951 – December 3, 1999) was an American businessman who was president of In-N-Out Burger from January 1994 until his death in December 1999. He was the elder son of In-N-Out founders Harry and Esther Snyder.

== Early life ==
Born in Covina, California, Snyder and his younger brother Rich spent their early childhood years in the Los Angeles suburb of Baldwin Park, California, where they lived across the street from the original In-N-Out Burger stand. By the late 1950s, the family had moved to a larger house in San Dimas, California, where Snyder would spend the remainder of his childhood.

For a time in the 1960s, Snyder and his brother attended Brown Military Academy, a military preparatory school in Glendora, California. Snyder graduated from Bonita High School in La Verne, California in 1969.

== Career ==
Following his brother's Rich's death in a December 1993 plane crash, Snyder became president of In-N-Out Burger. During his six-year tenure as chief executive, he expanded the number of company stores from 93 to 140.

== Personal life ==
On Valentine's Day, 1981, Snyder married Lynda Lou Perkins (née Wilson), a divorcée from Torrance, California. The marriage produced one daughter, Lynsi, who was born in 1982. Through his first marriage, Snyder had two stepdaughters, Traci Taylor and Teri Prince. Snyder and Wilson separated in 1995; their divorce was finalized in January 1997.

On September 28, 1997, Snyder married his childhood friend Kathy Touché. This marriage was short-lived, ending in divorce in 1999.

== Death ==
On December 3, 1999, Snyder died of congestive heart failure as a result of an accidental overdose of prescription painkillers (hydrocodone). According to his ex-wife Linda, Snyder had a long history of drug abuse following a motorbike accident in the 1970s and spiralled out of control. At the time of his death, he had been living in a motorhome parked outside the Lancaster, California, home of his first wife's nephew.
