= Esther Snyder =

American businesswoman (1920–2006)

- Born: Esther Lavelle Johnson; January 7, 1920; Sorento, Illinois, US
- Died: August 4, 2006 (aged 86); Irvine, California, US
- Known for: Co-founding In-N-Out Burger
- Spouse: Harry Snyder (m. 1948; died 1976)
- Children: Guy Snyder; Rich Snyder; Wilbur Stites

Esther Lavelle Snyder (née Johnson) (January 7, 1920 – August 4, 2006) was an American businesswoman. She co-founded In-N-Out Burger, with her husband Harry Snyder, in 1948. Snyder was the fast-food chain's president from January 2000 until her death.

== Early life ==
Snyder was born and raised in Sorento, Illinois, as the fifth of eight children (seven daughters, one son) to parents Orla and Mabel Johnson. She attended Greenville College and graduated from Seattle Pacific University with a bachelor's degree in zoology.

== Career ==
During In-N-Out's early years, Snyder managed all of the company bookkeeping herself, creating thousands of pages of handwritten notes and accounts.

From January 2000 until her August 2006 death, Snyder was the company's president.

== Personal life ==
She met Harry Snyder in 1947, while working at a restaurant in Seattle; the two were married the following year and moved to Baldwin Park, California. By the late 1950s, the couple had moved to a larger house in the nearby city of San Dimas, California.

Esther and Harry Snyder had three children: biological sons Guy (1951-1999) and Rich Snyder (1952-1993), and an adopted son named Wilbur Stites (1951-1979), a local orphan whom the Snyders began fostering in the early 1960s. Esther outlived her husband, who died in 1976 from lung cancer and all three of their sons: Guy succumbed to a drug overdose, Rich died in a plane crash and Wilbur was killed in an automobile crash.

Following her husband's death, Snyder spent the last two decades of her life living in Glendora, California, where she owned a home that author Stacy Perman described as "a ranch house shaded by oak trees and fronted by a white fence."

== Death ==
Snyder died on August 4, 2006, in Irvine, California, aged 86, from undisclosed causes. Her only grandchild, Lynsi Snyder, is now the heiress to the In-N-Out Burger company.

== Esther Snyder Community Center ==
Since In-N-Out Burger was started in the city of Baldwin Park, the city named its community center after Esther Snyder.
