= Complete Savages =

American television sitcom

- Genre: Sitcom
- Created by: Mike Scully; Julie Thacker
- Starring: Keith Carradine; Erik von Detten; Andrew Eiden; Shaun Sipos; Evan Ellingson; Jason Dolley; Vincent Ventresca
- Theme music composer: Terry Adams; Joe Interlande
- Composer: Eric Speier
- Country of origin: United States
- Original language: English
- No. of seasons: 1
- No. of episodes: 19

Production
- Executive producers: Bruce Davey; Mel Gibson; Mike Scully; Julie Thacker
- Producers: Nancy Cotton; Lissa Levin
- Cinematography: Chris La Fountaine
- Editors: Robert Bramwell; Larry Harris
- Camera setup: Multi-camera
- Running time: 30 minutes
- Production companies: Nothing Can Go Wrong Now Productions; Icon Productions; NBC Universal Television Studio

Original release
- Network: ABC
- Release: September 24, 2004 – June 17, 2005

Complete Savages is an American sitcom that was broadcast on ABC from September 24, 2004, to June 17, 2005. It was part of ABC's first attempt to renew its TGIF block since the original came to an end in 2000. The show was created by Mike Scully and Julie Thacker and executive produced by Mel Gibson. Produced by Nothing Can Go Wrong Now Productions, Icon Productions and NBC Universal Television Studio, it was cancelled after its first season due to low ratings.

== Synopsis ==
Nick Savage is a single father struggling to raise his five unruly sons (Jack, Chris, Sam, Kyle, and T.J.) alone, following the abandonment of their mother 10 years previously. Nick works on call, day and night, as a firefighter with his brother, Jimmy. Nick's boys constantly stir up trouble and create unpredictable circumstances for the entire family to somehow resolve.

== Production ==
The show's production was announced in a press release on November 5, 2003. The show was inspired by Mel Gibson's experience as a father of six sons. The theme song was composed and performed by Joseph Interlande, and appears at the beginning of each episode as a jam session amongst the whole Savage family.

== Cast and characters ==
=== Main cast ===
- Keith Carradine as Nick Savage – the irritable patriarch of the Savage family. His wife left him ten years prior to the pilot episode. He is quick-tempered. Although some of his parenting style is regarded by his sons as unfair, he always shows that he has his sons' best interests at heart and is very concerned for their education and well being. However, his solution to most problems is to get angry, a solution which seems to have been picked up by his sons Chris and Kyle and occasionally Jack. He works as a firefighter along with his younger brother, Jimmy. Although uptight and ill-tempered he is shown to be a "cool" dad allowing some things slide with his sons for their happiness usually with girls.
- Shaun Sipos as Jack Savage – the eldest son. He is considered the "cool" brother and has many girlfriends. He is an aspiring musician who sings and plays the guitar. Jack often takes on the role of leader for the boys and always organizes, stages, and tries to hold the brother together, mainly against their father. Jack is often envied tremendously by Sam mainly due to the reason that Jack is more popular in school and has many girlfriends while Sam is nerdy and finds it hard to get girls. Although Jack tries to seem independent, he often shows a lot of caring for his brothers, especially T.J.
- Erik von Detten as Chris Savage – A varsity letterman who is considered a dumb jock, as he was failing five different school subjects. Chris seems to have a very strong conscience as opposed to Kyle. Chris often agrees with Jack due to Jack's great persuasion skills, combined with the fact that Chris is easily swayed and not that bright in the head. He also shows violence as a way of solving his problems as he's not good with words. He clearly shows his superiority over his younger brothers through his often used punishment "You're going in the pit" inherited from his father.
- Andrew Eiden as Sam Savage – the middle son considered "black sheep" of the group, as he is responsible and does his school work. He is an honor student who enjoys studying and being with his girlfriend. He is known for getting A's in school with the exception of P.E. Sam was always considered by the boys' father as the easiest one to break when the boys were staging a front.
- Evan Ellingson as Kyle Savage – A rebellious teenager who is unruly and constantly causing chaos. He has little regard for the safety of himself or others. Unlike his brother Chris, Kyle shows a lack of a conscience. He rarely feels bad or guilty about anything he does. He frequently hangs around with his younger brother T.J., whom he often convinces to do stupid things. Despite his misbehavior, he appears to be more mischievous rather than malicious. He is reckless and proud.
- Jason Dolley as T.J. Savage – the youngest son who basically does everything Kyle tells him to do. He constantly shows his obsession of farts. T.J. is a typical little brother. He is considered cute but deceiving with a reckless side.
- Vincent Ventresca as Jimmy Savage – Nick's brother who works as a firefighter along with Nick. His personality is quite the opposite of his brother's, and more inline of Nick's sons, and he seemed to lead a careless life. He is single and has no kids, yet, is shown to be the fun uncle.

=== Minor cast ===
- Autumn Reeser as Angela Anderson – Sam's next door neighbor and girlfriend. She is very much like Sam, in that she was very studious. She did not show interest in him at first even though Sam is quickly smitten with her and works extremely hard to get her attention. Unlike Sam's family, her family is high class and more suave.
- Kylie Sparks as Brenda – the neighborhood bully. She is in the glee club, and is not very liked by the Savage family, even Nick pranks her house on Halloween. She is big, brutal and impulsive; expressed interest in dating Sam in one episode. She is known to be rude and have a disgusting attitude.
- Mel Gibson as Officer Steve Cox – a cop in a series of cheesy safety videos.
- Candace Kita as Misty – Officer Cox's girlfriend in the series of safety videos, who usually dies from an accident involving the theme of the video at the end.
- Betty White as Mrs. Agnes Riley – the crotchety old neighbor who despises the boys and often takes their belongings from them when they go into her yard.
- Kelly as the Savages' nameless pet dog – he is not very fond of Sam but is practically part of the family; eating at the table and getting involved in all the mischief. He is well trained and probably more civil than the boys.
- Mrs. Savage – The unseen Matriarch of the family who Nick divorced after a string of incidents that ended with glass in his meatloaf. She is said to be insane by several members of the family, was mentioned to have wanted Nick dead, and Nick threatens the boys several times with calling her back when they misbehave.

== Episodes ==
No.	Title	Directed by	Written by	Original release date	U.S. viewers (millions)
1	"Pilot"	Mel Gibson	Mike Scully & Julie Thacker	September 24, 2004	6.43
When the 23rd housekeeper quits from the Savages' house, burning their laundry in the process, all the boys want Nick to hire a new one. He refuses, however, telling the boys they need to be more responsible and clean up after themselves. To sway their father, the boys make the house more disorderly than ever thanks to Jack. Meanwhile, Sam wants to ask Angela, his neighbour, to go to the school dance with him. The two stories join when Nick has Angela visit the house. Sam quickly rallies everyone to clean up to help him win the girl.
2	"Tutoring"	Mel Gibson	Story by : Mike Scully; Teleplay by : Julie Thacker	October 1, 2004	5.48
Progress report day leaves all the kids on edge, even Sam who is failing PE because he couldn't climb the rope. Chris has failed five subjects, putting his position on the football team at risk. They make an agreement with Coach McCarthy in order to fix their grades: Sam will help Chris study, and the coach will pass Sam. Chris shows no interest in his studies and Sam desists. Chris enlists Angela to help tutor him, which makes Sam jealous. When Sam tries to attack Chris, he finally climbs the rope - only to fall and hurt his "weiner", which the boys find hilarious.
3	"Almost Men in Uniform"	Julie Thacker	Brian Scully	October 8, 2004	4.90
After Nick is put on call at the firehouse he is not sure what to do about Kyle and T.J. since the rest of boys have plans to go out. He decides his only choice is to take them with him to the firehouse, where they quickly become bored. Soon after their evening plans fall apart, Jack, Chris and Sam have the house to themselves. Seeing their uncle getting treated like a hero with free stuff as a fireman, they decide that they want to get free things too so they dress up in their dad's firefighter gear. After they get free stuff, they decide to go to a bar to meet girls. Sam meets a pregnant woman and she goes into labour. The boys as firemen are forced to deliver the baby on a bar table. Someone calls the fire department and Nick comes to the bar to aid the woman. He finds the boys with the baby and is furious. He soon is compassionate though when he allows the girls to continue to believe that the boys are firemen to keep the ongoing attraction.
4	"Nick Kicks Butt"	Gary Halvorson	Story by : Mel Gibson; Teleplay by : Steven Molaro	October 15, 2004	5.29
Nick finds out that Kyle has taken up smoking. He makes a deal with Kyle that neither of them will smoke anymore, otherwise they will have to run through town completely naked, but Nick has trouble trying to quit.
5	"Car Jack"	Robby Benson	Adam Lorenzo	October 22, 2004	5.82
Jack considers buying a used car for $1,000. Instead he buys a red motorcycle, which Nick is completely against. Jack uses it with Sam, who breaks his arm. They try to hide it, but Nick finds out and ties the bike to the porch. The boys try to escape, but they rip off the porch and drag it along after them. TJ, Chris, Sam, and Kyle are forced to watch safety videos while Jack and Jimmy fix the porch.
6	"Free Lily"	Julie Thacker	Mike Scully	October 29, 2004	6.24
Chris is distressed when he learns he must dissect the class frog. He refuses and everyone makes fun of him. He gives into peer pressure and cuts the frog. Later that night, in a dream, the frog visits Chris's room and tells him to save the new class frog, Lilly. As the rest of the Savages are planning their Halloween prank, Chris makes stealing Lilly their prank.
7	"For Whom the Cell Tolls"	Julie Thacker	Andy Gordon	November 5, 2004	6.70
Watching Sam moping around the house and staring out the window at Angela while she goes out on dates prompts Jack to take Sam to the mall to pick up girls. When Jack sets him up with a girl named Erin (Kaley Cuoco), they hit it off right away. Nevertheless, Sam becomes aggravated when Erin can not seem to put down her cell phone. Meanwhile, Chris gets a job at the mall selling paper airplane gliders. TJ and Kyle buy one, but soon realize that they have purchased a faulty product and decide to annoy Chris in any way possible in order to get their money back.
8	"Carnival Knowledge"	Daniel Stern	Lissa Levin	November 12, 2004	6.54
When the boys hear about a carnival in town, they all decide to attend with various schemes in mind. Kyle's plan is just to act mischievous; Chris and Jack's plans are to find girls who have already eaten so they would not have to spend any money; and Sam plans to ask Angela to join him as a date (being that she recently broke up with her boyfriend). T.J. is stuck at home writing a book report; when he finishes, he faces a new problem when the dog literally eats his homework and he realizes no one will believe him. The bad luck keeps spreading with the Savage boys when Chris and Jack's dates keep coming up with ways to make them spend money and Sam has to fight off his feelings for Angela when she reveals she only wants to be friends.
9	"My Two Sons"	Paul Abascal	Story by : Julie Thacker; Teleplay by : Donick Cary & Julie Thacker	November 19, 2004	6.74
The boys are sick of having Nick coming home early and stealing their TV time, so they take his picture and sign him up for an online dating service. They find five women Nick would like and trick him into meeting them. Nick finds out and goes to the bar where he meets another woman and asks her out. When Nick learns she only wants two kids, he only talks about TJ and Sam and neglects to mention his three other sons.
10	"Thanksgiving with the Savages"	Daniel Stern	Mike Scully	November 26, 2004	5.66
Sam wants to have Thanksgiving dinner with his girlfriend Angie. Nick is upset by this as tradition dictates that the family spend the holiday together including watching the Three Stooges marathon, and this year it is cancelled. With Sam away, the remaining four boys decide to make dinner by cooking a live turkey.
11	"The Man Without a Ball"	Mel Gibson	Story by : Mike Scully; Teleplay by : Donick Cary	December 3, 2004	6.25
The boys play rake ball with their dad's cherished high school basketball. The ball lands in the yard of Mrs. Agnes Riley, their neighbor. She takes the ball inside and refuses to give it to them. When she's away, the brothers sneak into the house and try to steal it. Mrs. Riley retaliates by holding their dog hostage.
12	"Voodude"	Shelley Jensen	Steven Molaro	December 10, 2004	5.31
Kyle finds himself smitten with Josie, a girl he is used to spending time with in detention, but fears having a girlfriend will turn him into a "wuss". Despite his attempts to not be "changed by a girl", he finds himself acting more and more silly around Josie. Meanwhile, T.J. and the boys are hard at work on a "destructo-boggan" which is guaranteed to knock all of the inner tubes off the slopes this year. Sam is poodle-sitting his girlfriend Angela's dog, Sally Sue, which doesn't sit well with the Savage dog.
13	"Savage XXX-mas"	Julie Thacker	Julie Thacker	December 17, 2004	6.54
When Nick informs his older sons that he wants them to get jobs, Sam, Chris and Jack find work at a lingerie store as stock boys. The job turns out to be a complete drag for Jack and Chris, but Sam does not mind it at all. After proving he is capable of being a good employee, Sam gets promoted which leaves Chris and Jack wanting revenge. Meanwhile, Kyle and T.J. are forced to help Nick donate toys to the needy, but when they discover a game that they want is going to someone else, they themselves start to feel needy.
14	"Save a Dance for Me"	Shelley Jensen	Steven Molaro	January 14, 2005	6.92
A school dance is coming up and Sam and Angela are going together. The captain of the dance squad asks Chris, and Jack has to teach Chris how to dance. Meanwhile, Kyle and T.J. use Nick's camcorder to videotape themselves doing outrageous stunts to upload on the website dumbidiots.com.
15	"Teen Things I Hate About You"	Daniel Stern	Brian Scully	January 21, 2005	6.14
Tired of having the boys' friends over so often, Nick and Jimmy go to a town meeting where Nick suggests that the city opens a teen center (as long as Nick is in charge). When the teen center opens, Nick becomes a busybody, from breaking up makeouts, giving advice on playing pinball and telling Jack to turn down the amp of his electric guitar. The boys fire their dad and Jimmy takes his place, but the boys realize their dad was right and the teen center is indeed out of control.
16	"Saving Old Lady Riley"	Julie Thacker	Mike Scully & Julie Thacker	May 27, 2005	3.50
Kyle, T.J., Jack, and Chris become local heroes when they save their next-door neighbor, Mrs. Riley, after she has a heart attack. Now admired by everyone including Nick, Jimmy and Mrs. Riley herself, they are even nominated for an award. As the boys enjoy their new-found success and rubbing it in a jealous Sam's face, someone discovers a secret that could expose the boys as frauds.
17	"Crimes and Mini-Wieners"	Shelley Jensen	Tom Gammill & Max Pross	June 3, 2005	3.82
Chris and Kyle become involved in a food fight and when they get in trouble, they end up dragging Sam down with them. As punishment, the boys are forced to be "lunch ladies" and serve the entire school. Meanwhile, Nick has to find a babysitter for T.J. He takes Jack's suggestion and hires April, a girl that goes to school with the boys, not realizing Jack has ulterior motives.
18	"Bad Reception"	Bill Shea	Donick Cary	June 10, 2005	3.08
Angela's grandmother "Grammy Na-Na" is celebrating her 80th birthday, all the Savages are invited. Unfortunately, they are unable to attend due a prior engagement: the Super Bowl. When Jack and the other boys see the wild Super Bowl halftime video for sale, they plead for their dad to spend the $39.95. After Nick refuses and runs out to get more beer, the boys have the genius idea of stealing the game from the cable box outside their house, only to destroy their TV signal in the process. The Savages end up at Angela's house attempting to watch the Super Bowl on the "futuristic" television they are confronted with upon arriving.
19	"Hot Water"	Gary Halvorson	Andy Gordon	June 17, 2005	3.12
When Nick and Jimmy's uncle dies and leaves them money, they decide to buy a hot tub. When the boys have the opportunity to use it, they ignore Nick's rule about using it without his permission and end up in a very complicated situation. Sam is not sure what to do when he discovers the size of the gift Angela is giving him to celebrate three months together is ten times bigger than the gift he is planning to give her.

== Awards and nominations ==
Awards and nominations for Complete Savages
Year	Award	Result	Category	Recipient
2005	ADG Excellence in Production Design Awards	Nominated	Television - Multi-Camera Television Series	Sharon Busse and Gary Smoot (For episode "Carnival Knowledge")
2005	People's Choice Awards	Nominated	Favorite New Television Comedy	—N/a
2005	Young Artist Award	Nominated	Best Performance in a TV Series (Comedy or Drama) - Supporting Young Actor	Evan Ellingson
2005	Young Artist Award	Nominated	Best Family Television Series (Comedy)	—N/a
2005	Young Artist Award	Won	Best Performance in a TV Series (Comedy or Drama) - Supporting Young Actor	Jason Dolley
