= Harry Snyder =

American businessman (1913–1976)

- Snyder, c. 1948
- Born: September 9, 1913; Vancouver, British Columbia, Canada
- Died: December 14, 1976 (aged 63); San Dimas, California, U.S.
- Known for: Co-founding In-N-Out Burger
- Spouse: Esther Johnson (m. 1948)
- Children: Guy Snyder; Rich Snyder

Harry Snyder (September 9, 1913 – December 14, 1976) was a Canadian-born American businessman. He co-founded In-N-Out Burger along with his wife Esther Snyder. Snyder was one of the first people to develop the idea of a drive-through hamburger restaurant, where customers could order their food via an intercom.

== Career ==
Born in Vancouver to Dutch immigrants Hendrick and Mary Snyder, Harry Snyder grew up in Seattle and Santa Monica. He would work odd jobs to support his family. During World War II, he worked several desk jobs for the U.S. Navy due to his perforated ear drum. After the war ended, he worked as a caterer in Fort Lawton where he met his wife Esther Johnson.

Snyder and his wife opened the first In-N-Out Burger on October 22, 1948, in the Los Angeles suburb of Baldwin Park, California. In-N-Out is described as California's first drive-through. By the mid-1950s, the chain had expanded to six stores in the Los Angeles area. By the time of Snyder's death in 1976, the company had expanded to 18 stores.

== Personal life ==
Snyder and his wife Esther married in 1948, the same year they founded In-N-Out. The couple had three children: two biological sons, Guy (1951-1999) and Rich Snyder (1952-1993), and adopted son Wilbur Stites (1951-1979), a local orphan whom the Snyders began fostering in the early 1960s.

Early in their marriage, the Snyders lived in Baldwin Park, across the street from the original In-N-Out hamburger stand. By the late 1950s, the family had moved to a larger house in the nearby city of San Dimas, California, where Snyder would spend the rest of his life.

The Snyders became lifelong friends of Carl Karcher, the founder of the Carl's Jr. hamburger chain, who provided them with business advice in In-N-Out's early years.

== Death ==
As a young man, Snyder was a heavy smoker. Despite having quit smoking many years before, he died at his San Dimas home from lung cancer in 1976, aged 63. His son Rich, then aged 24, subsequently took over as In-N-Out's president.
