= Rich Snyder (businessman) =

American businessman

- Born: Richard Allen Snyder; July 13, 1952; Covina, California, U.S.
- Died: December 15, 1993 (aged 41); Santa Ana, California, U.S.
- Education: Bonita High School
- Known for: President of In-N-Out Burger, 1976-1993
- Spouse: Christina Bradley (1992-1993)

Richard Allen Snyder (July 13, 1952 – December 15, 1993) was an American businessman who was president of In-N-Out Burger from 1976 until his death in 1993. Snyder is credited with transforming In-N-Out from a local chain of burger stands into a major business enterprise.

== Early life and education ==
Born in Covina, California, Snyder was the second of two sons born to In-N-Out founders Harry and Esther Snyder. He and his older brother Guy spent their early childhood years in the Los Angeles suburb of Baldwin Park, California, where they lived across the street from the original In-N-Out Burger stand. By the late 1950s, the family had moved to a larger house in San Dimas, California, where Snyder would spend the remainder of his childhood.

For a time in the 1960s, Snyder and his brother attended Brown Military Academy, a military preparatory school in Glendora, California. Snyder graduated from Bonita High School in La Verne, California in 1970, where he had been a member of the school's rocket club and varsity football team. Snyder suffered from dyslexia, though he was not formally diagnosed with the disorder until well into his adulthood.

== Career ==
Following his father's death from lung cancer in 1976, a then 24-year-old Snyder became president of In-N-Out Burger. During his 17-year tenure as chief executive, he expanded the number of company stores from 18 to 93. In 1981, he opened a new headquarters for the company in Baldwin Park.

During his father's lifetime, In-N-Out's executive team consisted solely of only Harry and Esther Snyder. Rich Snyder set the company up for much greater expansion by creating an internal human resources department, a finance department and a small advertising department. He also hired an array of executives, many of whom would stay and grow with the company for decades. In 1984, Snyder built In-N-Out University to help train future company managers and leaders.

During the 1980s, Snyder became a born-again Christian. Subsequently, he added Bible verses to In-N-Out's packaging.

== Personal life ==
In May 1992, a 39-year-old Snyder married 26-year-old Christina Bradley in Maui, Hawaii. The couple resided in a $3.5 million waterfront home in Newport Beach, California. Through his marriage, Snyder had a stepdaughter named Siobhan.

== Death ==
On December 15, 1993, Snyder died while returning to his Newport Beach home from the opening of In-N-Out store 93 in Fresno, California. Snyder's chartered Westwind business jet was caught in the wake turbulence of a Boeing 757 while on approach to John Wayne International Airport, causing the business jet to crash in Santa Ana, California. All five people aboard, including Snyder, died instantly.
