= In-N-Out Burger =

American fast food chain

In-N-Out Burgers

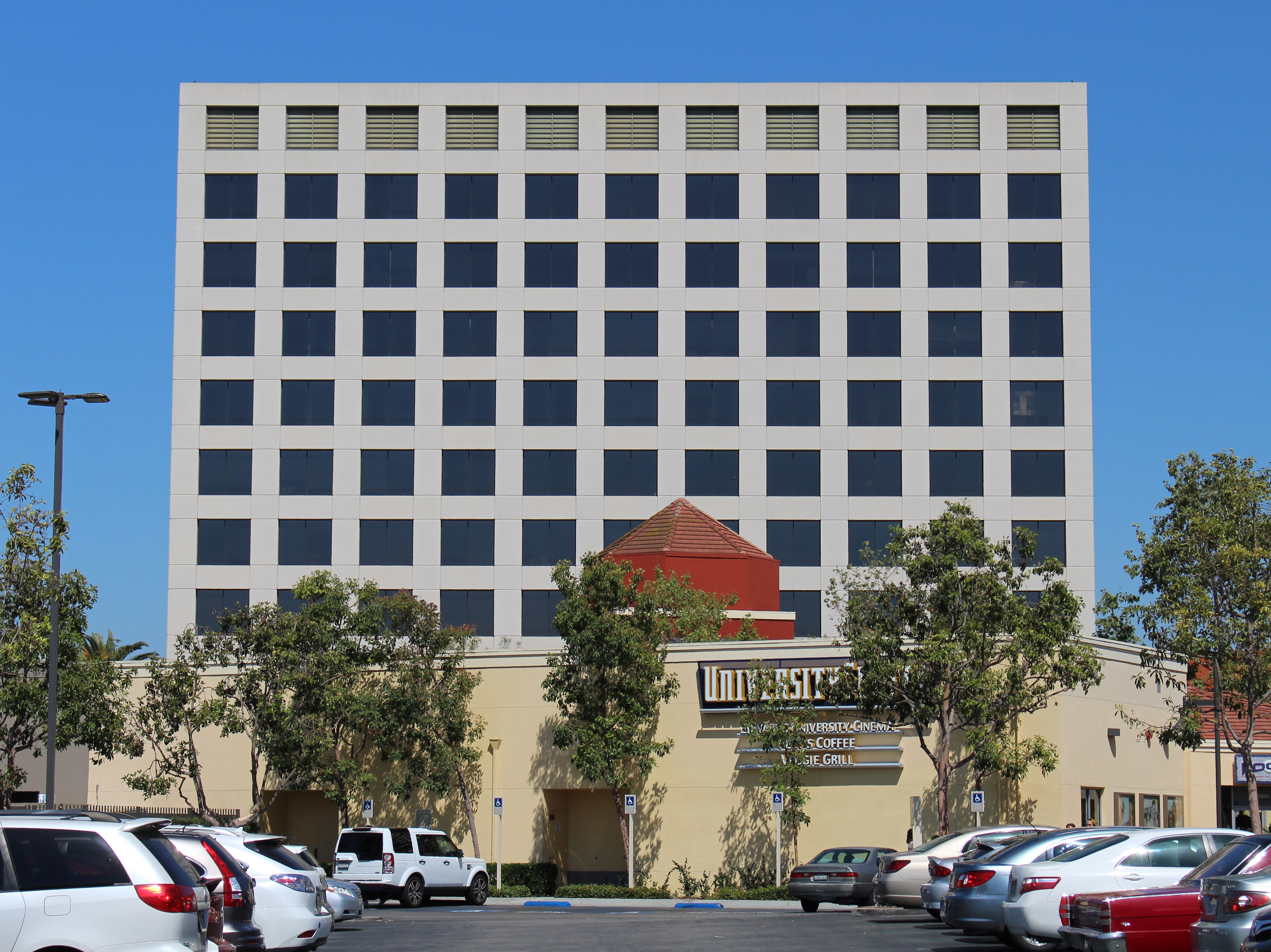
- Headquarters at University Tower in Irvine, California
- Type: Private
- Industry: Restaurant
- Genre: Fast food
- Founded: October 22, 1948; 78 years ago, in Baldwin Park, California, U.S.
- Founders: Esther Snyder; Harry Snyder
- Headquarters: Irvine, California, U.S.
- Number of locations: 424
- Area served: Arizona; California; Colorado; Idaho; Nevada; Oregon; Tennessee; Texas; Utah; Washington
- Key people: Lynsi Snyder (president); Denny Warnick (COO); Michael Mravle (CFO)
- Revenue: ▲US$1.823 billion (FY 2022)
- Owner: Lynsi Snyder
- Number of employees: ▲27,000 (FY 2021)
- Website: in-n-out.com

In-N-Out Burgers, doing business as In-N-Out Burger, is an American regional chain of fast food restaurants with locations primarily in California and to a lesser extent the West Coast and Southwest. It was founded in Baldwin Park, California, in 1948 by Harry (1913–1976) and Esther Snyder (1920–2006). The chain is headquartered in Irvine, California, and has expanded outside Southern California into the rest of California, as well as into Arizona, Nevada, Utah, Texas, Oregon, Colorado, Idaho, Washington, and Tennessee, and is planning expansion into New Mexico. The current owner is Lynsi Snyder, the Snyders' only grandchild.

As the chain has expanded, it has opened several distribution centers in addition to its original Baldwin Park location. The new facilities, located in Lathrop, California; Phoenix, Arizona; Draper, Utah; Dallas, Texas; and Colorado Springs, Colorado, will provide for potential future expansion into other parts of the country.

In-N-Out Burger has chosen not to franchise its operations or go public; one reason is the prospect of food quality or customer consistency being compromised by excessively rapid business growth. The In-N-Out restaurant chain has developed a highly loyal customer base, and has been rated as one of the top fast food restaurants in several customer satisfaction surveys.

== History ==
=== First generation ===
In-N-Out Burger's first location was opened in the Los Angeles suburb of Baldwin Park, California, in 1948 by the Snyders at the southwest corner of what is now the intersection of Interstate 10 and Francisquito Avenue. The restaurant was the first drive-thru hamburger stand in California, allowing drivers to place orders via a two-way speaker system. This was a new and unique idea, since in post-World War II California, carhops were used to take orders and serve food.

In 1951, a second In-N-Out was opened in Covina, California, west of the intersection of Grand Avenue and Arrow Highway. The company remained a relatively small Southern California chain until the 1970s. The Snyders managed their first restaurants closely to ensure quality was maintained. The chain had 18 restaurants when Harry Snyder died in 1976, at the age of 63.

=== Second generation ===
In 1976, 24-year-old Rich Snyder became the company president after his father's death. Along with his brother Guy, Rich had begun working in his father's In-N-Outs at an early age. Over the next 20 years, the chain experienced a period of rapid growth under Rich's leadership, expanding to 93 restaurants. In June 1988, In-N-Out opened its 50th location, in Thousand Palms, California.

The first location outside of the Los Angeles metropolitan area opened in San Diego County in 1990, the 57th location in the chain. In 1992, In-N-Out opened its first non-Southern California restaurant, in Las Vegas, Nevada. Its first Northern California location opened the following year in Modesto. Expansion then spread to Northern California, including the San Francisco Bay Area, while additional Las Vegas-area restaurants were added. After opening the 93rd In-N-Out store in Fresno, California, on December 15, 1993, Rich Snyder and four other passengers died in a plane crash on approach to John Wayne Airport in Orange County, California.

Upon Rich Snyder's death, Guy Snyder assumed the presidency in January 1994 and continued the company's aggressive expansion until he died from an overdose of painkillers in 1999. Under his leadership, In-N-Out's 100th location was opened in Gilroy, California, on November 10, 1994. He was president for nearly six years, expanding In-N-Out from 93 to 140 locations. His mother Esther subsequently took over the presidency.

=== 21st century ===
In-N-Out Burger sign in Norwalk, California

With Esther Snyder's death in 2006 at the age of 86, the presidency passed to Mark Taylor, former vice president of operations. Taylor became the company's fifth president and first non-family member to hold the position, although he did have ties to the family. The company's current heiress is Lynsi Snyder, daughter of Guy and only grandchild of Esther and Harry Snyder. Snyder, who was 23 years old and known as Lynsi Martinez at her grandmother's death, owns the company through a trust. She gained control of 50% of the company in 2012 when she turned 30, and nearly full control at 35 in May 2017.

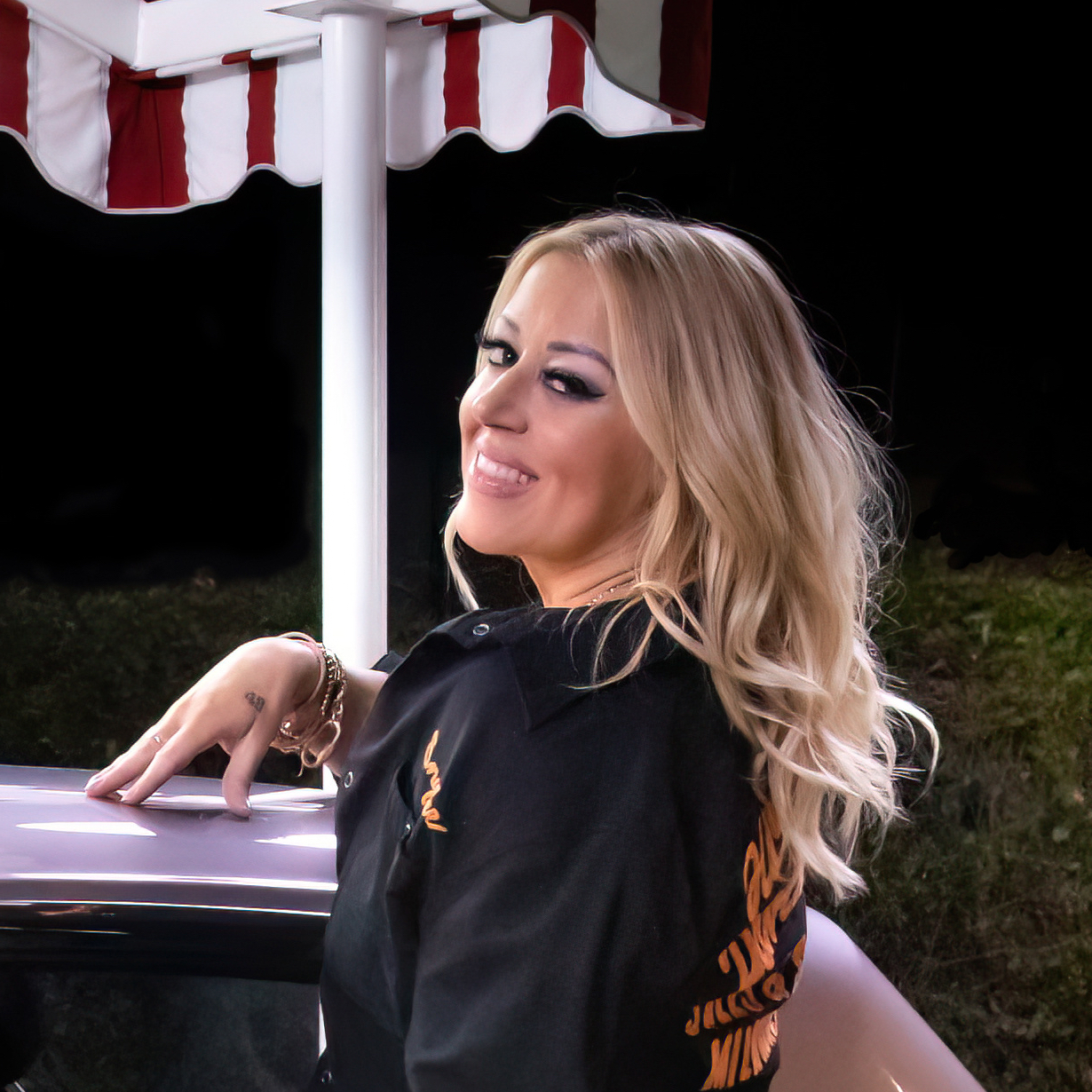
Lynsi Snyder, the current owner and president of In-N-Out Burger

After participating in various roles in the company, Snyder assumed the presidency in 2010, becoming the company's sixth president. However, most major decisions are made by a seven-member executive team. Snyder does not intend to franchise nor sell and plans to pass on ownership of the company to her children.

In 2018, In-N-Out donated $25,000 to the California Republican Party. In 2021, it donated $40,000. In-N-Out COO Mark Taylor and his wife, Traci, have donated to Donald Trump's presidential campaigns. On January 24, 2024, In-N-Out announced the closure of its only store in Oakland, California, due to safety concerns related to crime, marking the first time in its 75-year history that the company has shut down a location.

On August 1, 2026, a mass shooting occurred at In-N-Out's Twin Falls, Idaho restaurant, killing three and wounding seven. The gunman, 24-year old Chad Williams, was confronted by Jordan Salinas, an armed civilian, and an off-duty state trooper. Williams eventually committed suicide. The motives for the attack are still unknown. The restaurant had opened about a week earlier.

=== Expansion ===
The company opened locations in Arizona in 2000 and added new restaurants in Reno, Sparks, and Carson City, Nevada, in late 2004. In-N-Out became a huge success in these new locations. In late December 2005, In-N-Out's 200th location was opened in Temecula, California. In 2007, it opened its first restaurant in Tucson, Arizona. The store opening broke company records for the most burgers sold in one day and the most sold in one week.

In 2008, In-N-Out expanded into a fourth state by opening a location in Washington, Utah, a suburb of St. George. By late 2009, the chain expanded into northern Utah with three new locations situated in Draper, American Fork, and Orem. More locations opened in the spring of 2010 in West Valley City, West Jordan, Centerville, and Riverton. In 2013, In-N-Out opened a distribution center in Las Vegas to serve mountain area restaurants.

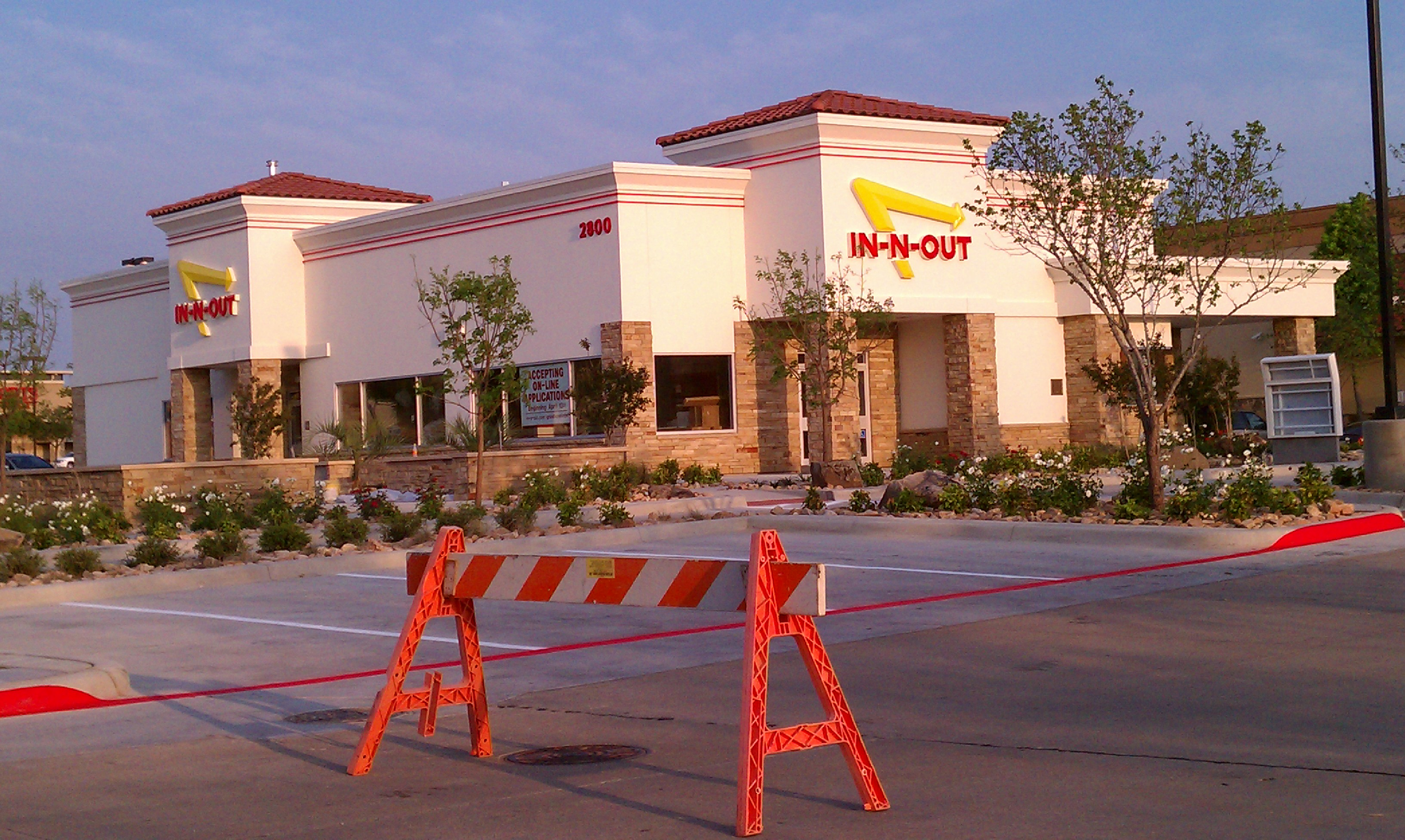
In-N-Out Burger in Frisco, Texas, one of the first locations to open in Texas

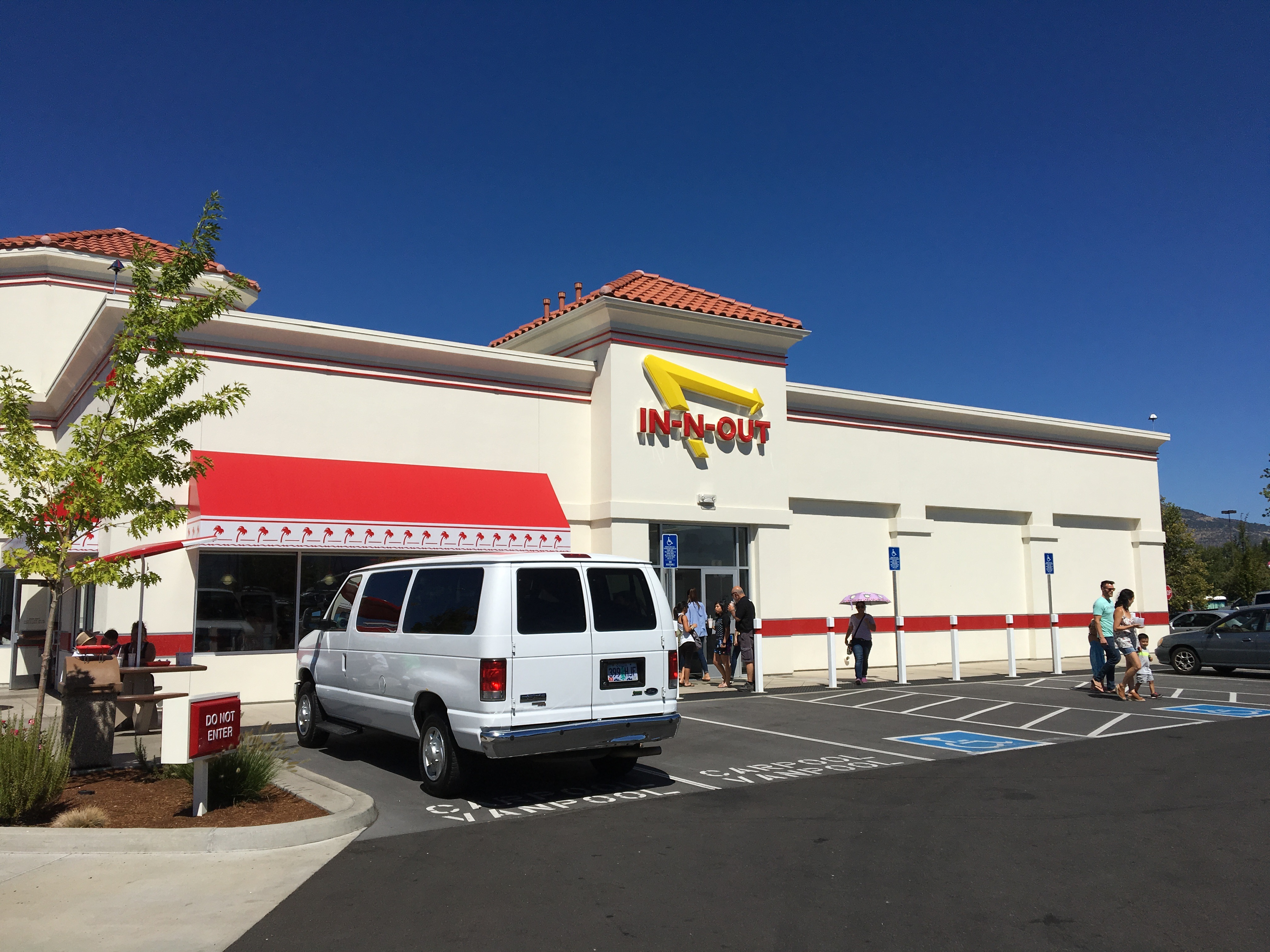
In-N-Out in Medford, Oregon, the first in the state

In May 2010, In-N-Out announced plans to open new spots into Texas, specifically within the Dallas–Fort Worth area with the first In-N-Out opening in Frisco and Allen on May 11, 2011. The chain opened its first location in Austin in December 2013. There are 18 restaurant locations in the Dallas–Fort Worth area, and four in the Austin area. These new locations in Texas required the company to build a new patty production facility and distribution center in the state, according to company vice president Carl Van Fleet. In March 2014, the company confirmed its first location in San Antonio. The fall of 2014 saw the restaurant open its 22nd Texas location in Killeen. On November 20, 2014, In-N-Out opened its first location in San Antonio followed by its first location in Waco in November 2015. In January 2017, In-N-Out announced plans to expand into Houston with multiple sites planned in the area, the first being in Stafford.

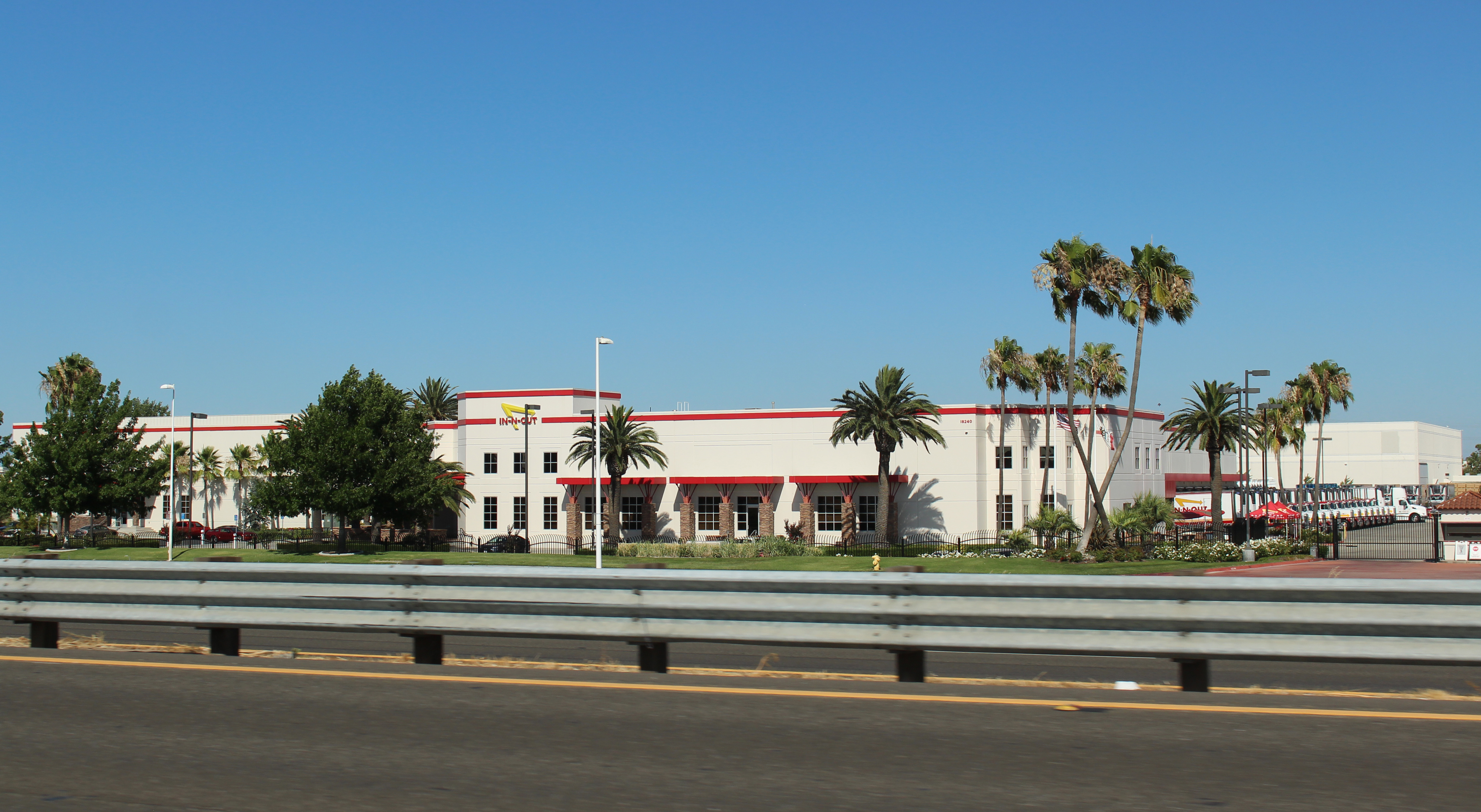
The distribution center in Lathrop, California, which serves Northern California and Oregon

In January 2015, In-N-Out opened its 300th restaurant, which was located in Anaheim, California. At the time of the opening, the company had generated $558 million in annual sales and employed nearly 18,000 in California, Nevada, Utah, Texas, and Arizona. The company opened its first location in Oregon on September 9, 2015 (the same day as Harry Snyder's birthday) in Medford. It is supplied from the Lathrop, California, distribution center completed in 2006. President Lynsi Snyder stated during the opening that they will continue to open new spots. A second Oregon location was under construction in Grants Pass during September 2017. On August 21, 2018, In-N-Out announced plans to open a location in the Willamette Valley in Keizer. This was the company's northernmost location.

On November 30, 2017, the company announced plans to build a production facility and distribution center in Colorado Springs, ahead of an expansion into Colorado, which is scheduled to be completed in 2021. The first Colorado locations opened in Colorado Springs and Aurora on November 20, 2020. In-N-Out received approval for a new distribution center to open in Chino, California, in 2020, taking some of the load off the long-standing Baldwin Park distribution center. The center opened later that year.

On November 24, 2020, In-N-Out signaled that it was in the early stages of opening a store in Idaho. The first store in the state opened in Meridian in December 2023. In-N-Out later expressed interest in opening additional stores in Boise and Nampa, as well as a second location in Meridian. The company pursued various locations around Portland, Oregon, which were rejected or stalled due to development issues; a location in Ridgefield, Washington, the first in Washington state, was announced in 2024. The location in Ridgefield, Washington opened on August 20, 2025, becoming the first in the state. A second Washington state location opened on April 23, 2026 in Vancouver, Washington. A location in Hillsboro, Oregon is expected to open in June 2026.

On January 10, 2023, Tennessee governor Bill Lee and In-N-Out president Lynsi Snyder announced that a new hub would be built in Franklin, Tennessee, to supply restaurants in the Southeast, beginning in the Nashville area. It is the company's first eastern hub and involved a $125.5 million investment. The first Nashville locations opened in December 2025.

On June 9, 2026, In-N-Out opened another location on the Las Vegas strip, located at BLVD. While the location does not have a drive thru, it is In-N-Out's second largest location (behind Barstow, California) at 8,000 square feet.

In-N-Out is planning to expand to New Mexico by 2027, with locations in Albuquerque. After expanding to New Mexico, In-N-Out will have a presence in every state in the Southwest.

Counties with at least one In-N-Out location (as of March 2020, with some later updates) Since 1992, In-N-Out has expanded beyond California to Arizona, Nevada, Texas, Utah, Oregon, Colorado, Idaho, Washington, and most recently, Tennessee.

== Products ==
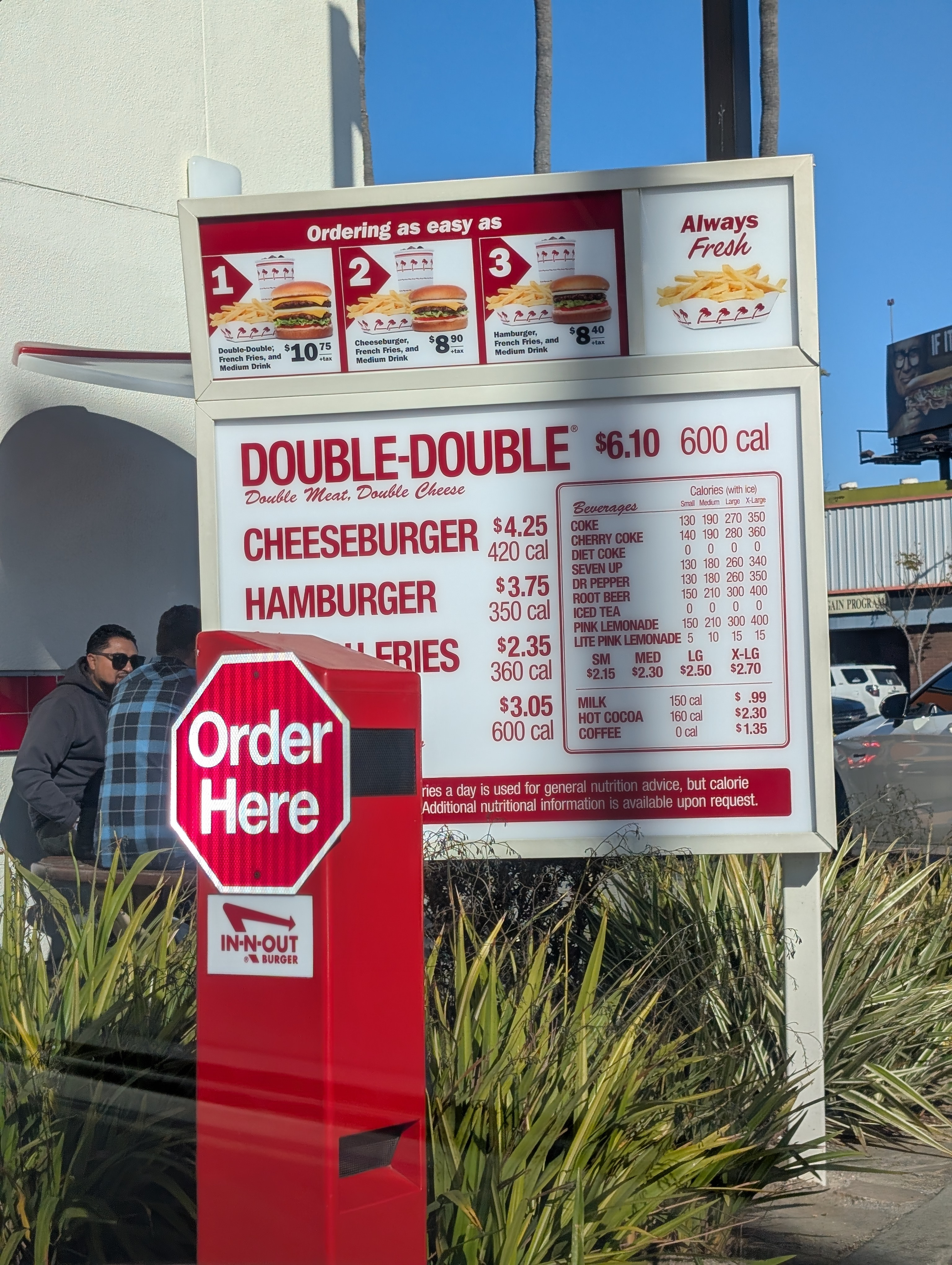
Photo of the In-N-Out menu in the drive-through line

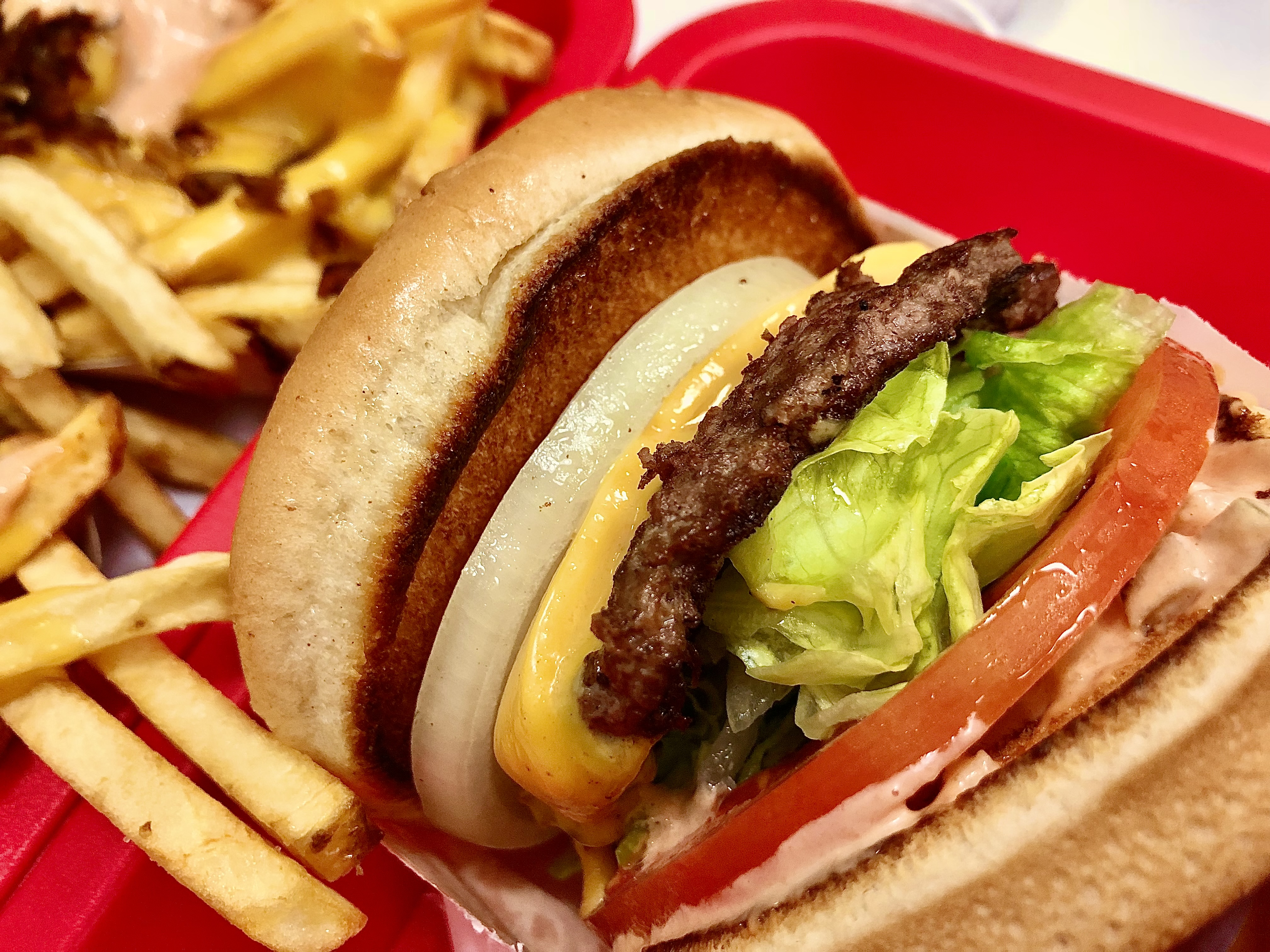
Cheeseburger from In-N-Out

The In-N-Out menu consists of three burger varieties: hamburger, cheeseburger, and "Double-Double" (two hamburger patties and two slices of cheese). French fries and fountain drinks are available, as well as three flavors of milkshakes. The hamburgers come with lettuce, tomato, with or without onions (the customer is asked upon ordering, and may have them fresh or grilled), and a sauce, which is called "spread" (a Thousand Island dressing variant).

There are additional named items not on the menu, but available at every In-N-Out. These variations reside on the chain's "secret menu", though the menu is accessible on the company's website. These variations include 3×3 (which has three patties and three slices of cheese), 4×4 (four patties and four slices of cheese), Neapolitan shakes, grilled cheese sandwich (consists of the same ingredients as the burgers except the meat, plus two slices of melted cheese), Protein Style (wrap with lettuce; consists of the same ingredients as the burgers except buns), and Animal Style (cooked in a thin layer of mustard, adding condiments including pickles, grilled onions, and extra spread). Animal Style fries come with two slices of melted cheese, spread, and grilled onions on top. Whole or sliced chili peppers are also available by request. Both Protein and Animal Style are house specialties that the company has trademarked because of their association with the chain.

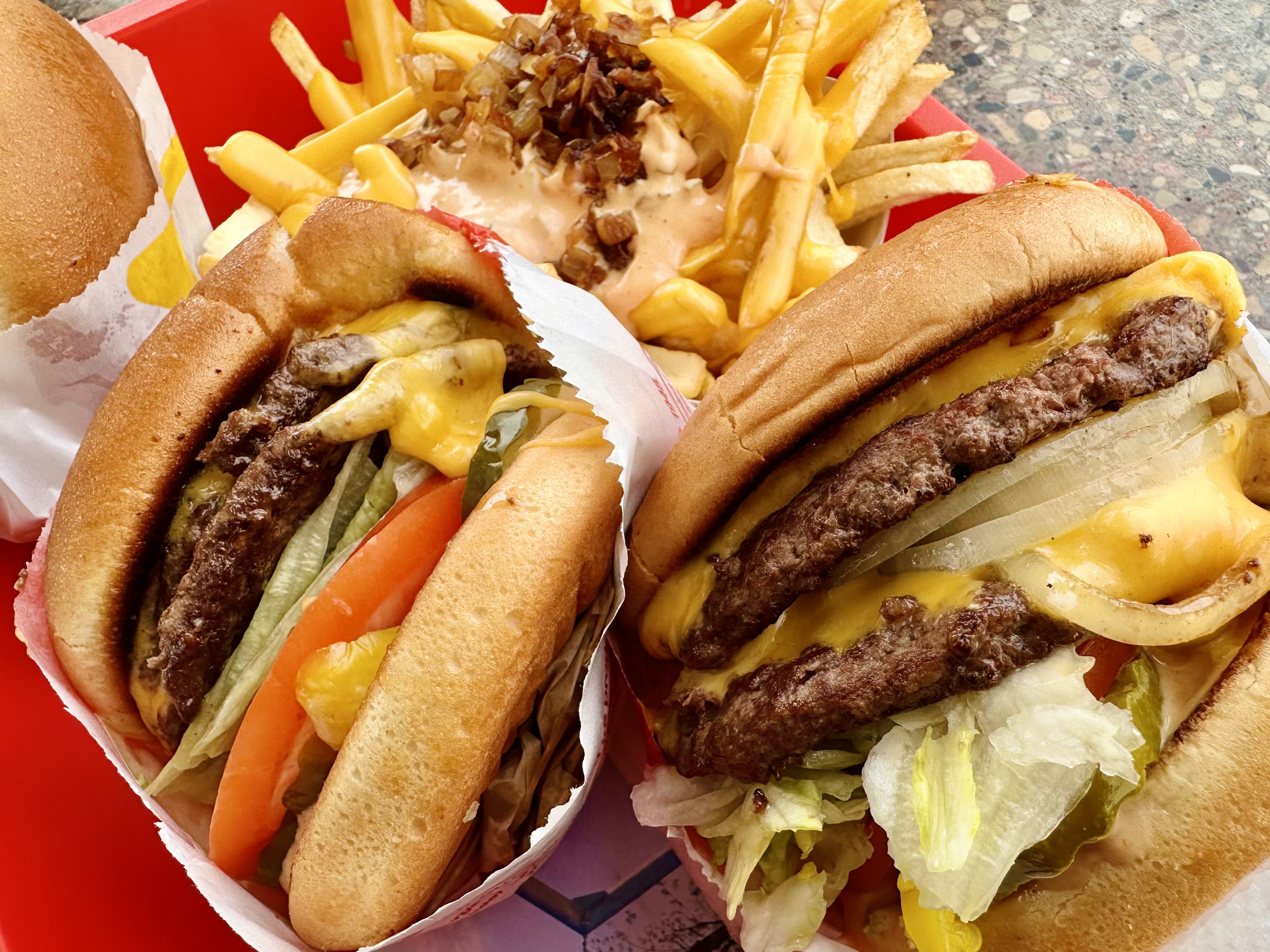
Double-Double cheeseburgers with Animal Style fries

Until 2005, In-N-Out accommodated burger orders of any size by adding patties and slices of cheese at an additional cost. A particularly famous incident involving a 100×100 (100 patties, 100 slices of cheese) occurred in 2004. Once word got out of the massive sandwich, In-N-Out management disallowed anything larger than a 4×4. One can also order what is called a "Flying Dutchman" which consists of two meat patties and two slices of cheese by itself (no bun, condiments, or vegetables).

In January 2018, In-N-Out added hot chocolate with marshmallows, the first addition to the menu in fifteen years since lemonade was added in 2003. However, it is not the first time it has appeared on the menu; it was previously served at the restaurants in its early years during the 1950s. The cocoa powder is provided by the Ghirardelli Chocolate Company.

== Store design and layout ==
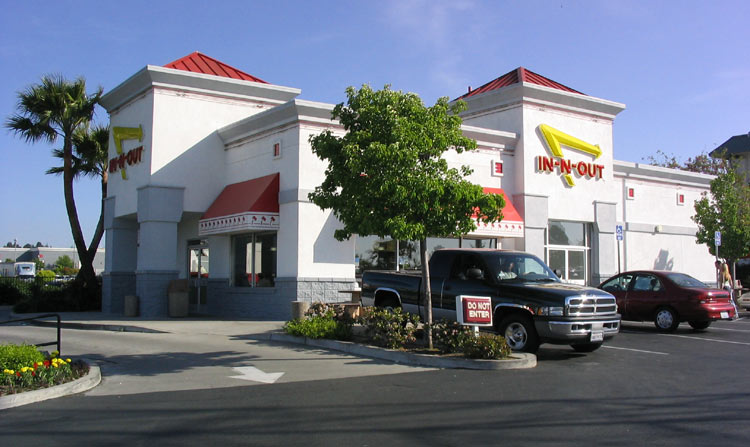
In-N-Out restaurant in Pinole, California, near Interstate 80 with one drive-thru lane and an indoor dining area. Note the crossed palm trees in the back.

The signature colors for In-N-Out are white, red, and yellow. The white is used for the buildings' exterior walls and the employees' basic uniform. Red is used for the buildings' roofs and the employees' aprons and hats. Yellow is used for the decorative band on the roof and iconic arrow in the logo. However, variations in the color scheme do occur.

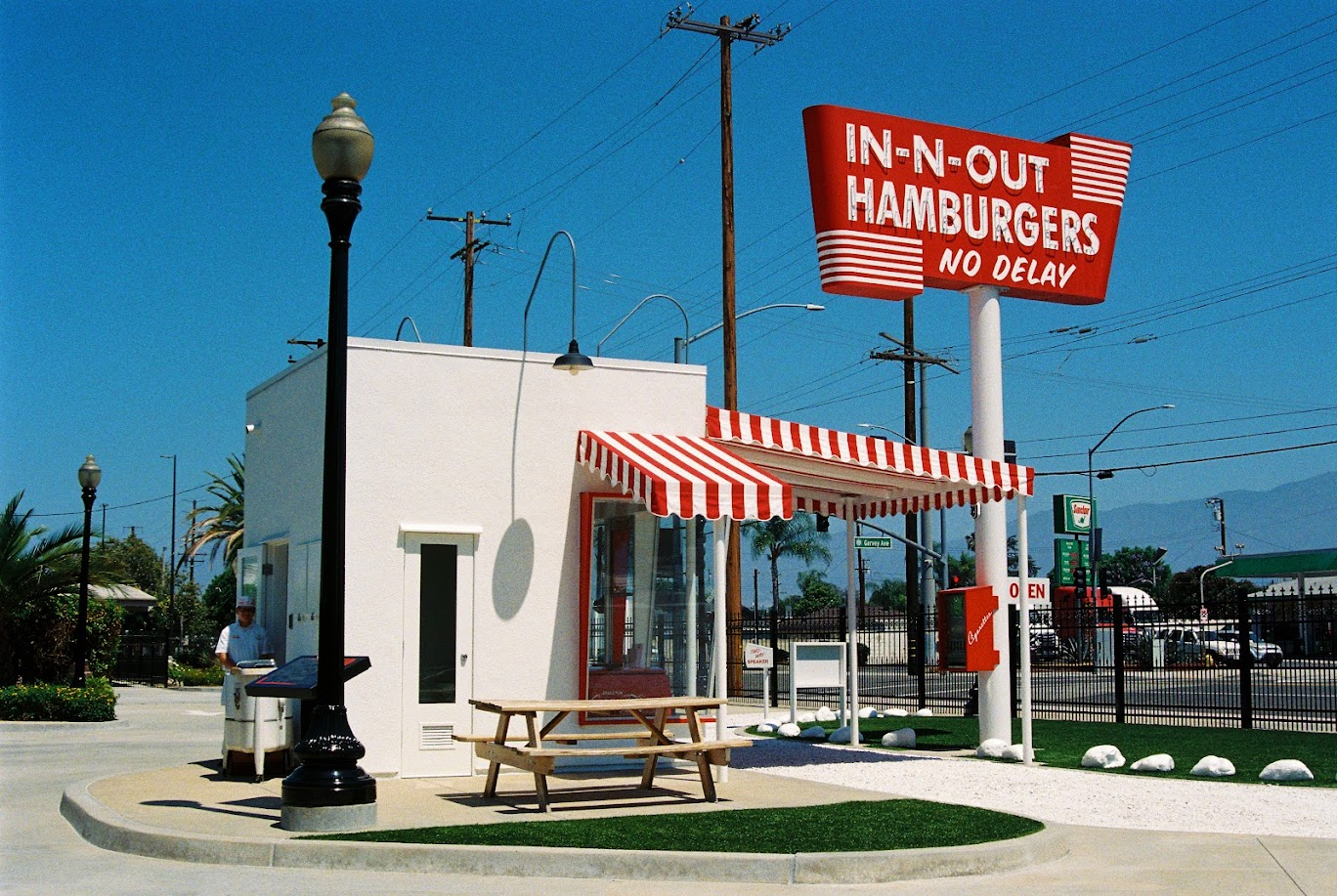
A replica of the original In-N-Out located in Baldwin Park, California

The first In-N-Outs had a common design, placing the kitchen "stand" between two lanes of cars. The "front" lane is nearest the street and the "back" lane away from the street. This location design is known as a double drive-thru. A metal awning provides shade for several tables for customers desiring to park and eat, but there is no indoor dining. A walk-up window faces the parking area. These restaurants store food and supplies in a separate building, and it is not uncommon for a driver to be asked to wait a moment while employees carry supplies to the kitchen across the rear lane. This design is a popular image on In-N-Out ads and artwork, which often shows classic cars such as 1965 Mustangs and 1968 Firebirds visiting the original restaurants. The original Covina restaurant, located on Arrow Highway west of Grand Avenue, was forced to close in the early 1990s due to re-engineering and development of the area. A modern design, drive-up/dining room restaurant was built a few hundred feet away. The replacement building was considerably larger, occupying nearly half the area of the original building's lot.

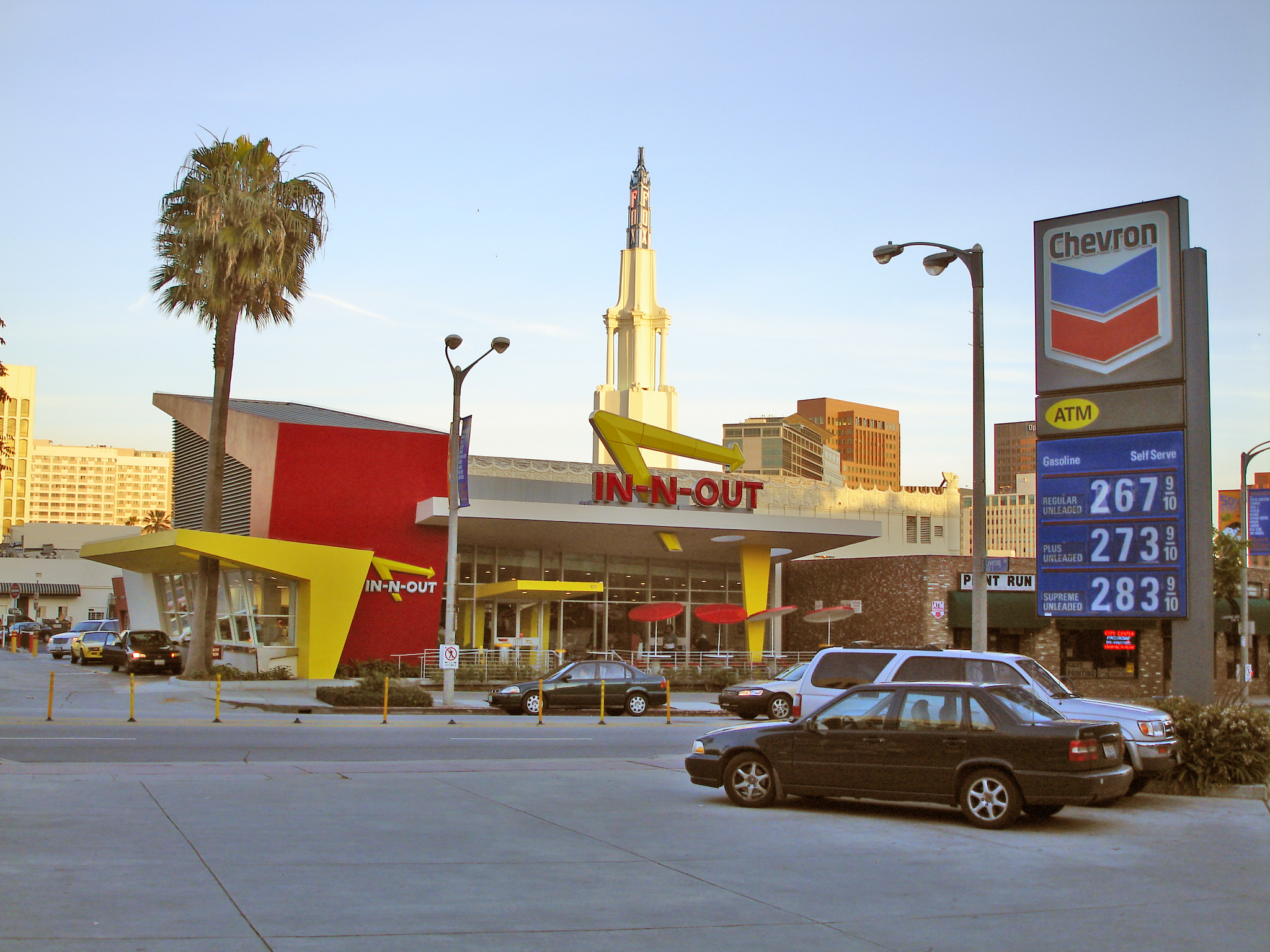
A Kanner Architects-designed store near the UCLA campus in Westwood, Los Angeles

Newer In-N-Out restaurants are based on standardized templates or blueprints, which are selected based on available space and expected traffic levels. While the external appearance of its buildings may vary to meet local zoning and architectural requirements, the interior floor plan and decor in most recently constructed In-N-Out restaurants are identical. However, some restaurants are designed to stand out, such as the restaurants at Fisherman's Wharf, San Francisco, and Westwood, Los Angeles, designed by architect Stephen Kanner.

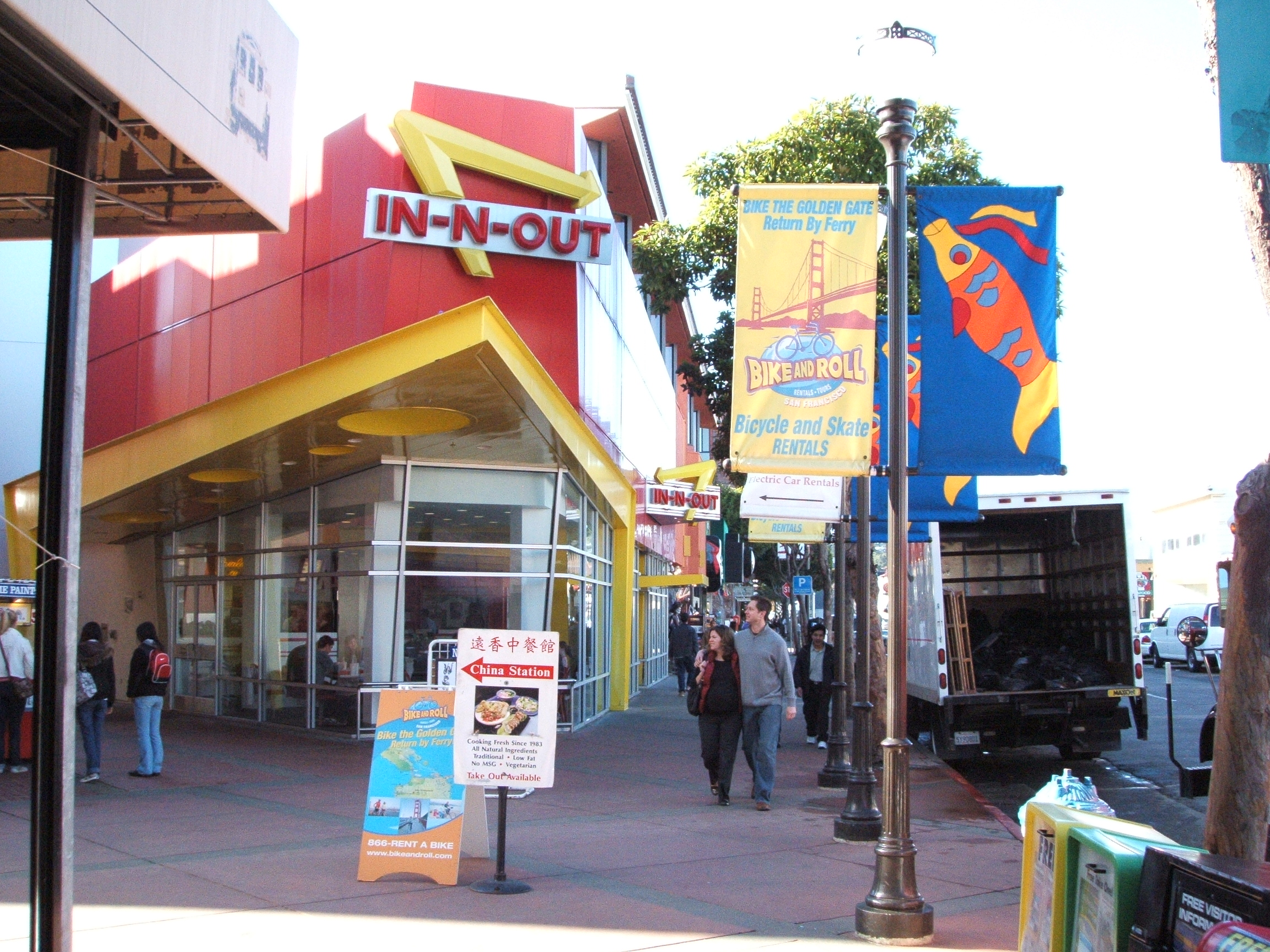
The In-N-Out Burger at Fisherman's Wharf in San Francisco

A typical contemporary location has an interior layout that includes a customer service counter with registers in front of a kitchen and food preparation area. There are separate storage areas for paper goods (napkins, bags, etc.) and "dry" food goods (potatoes, buns, etc.), as well as a walk-in refrigerator for perishable goods (lettuce, cheese, spread, etc.), and a dedicated meat refrigerator for burger patties. The customer area includes an indoor dining room with a combination of booths, tables, and bar-style seating. Outside seating is usually available as well, with tables and benches. Most newer restaurants contain a one-lane drive-through.

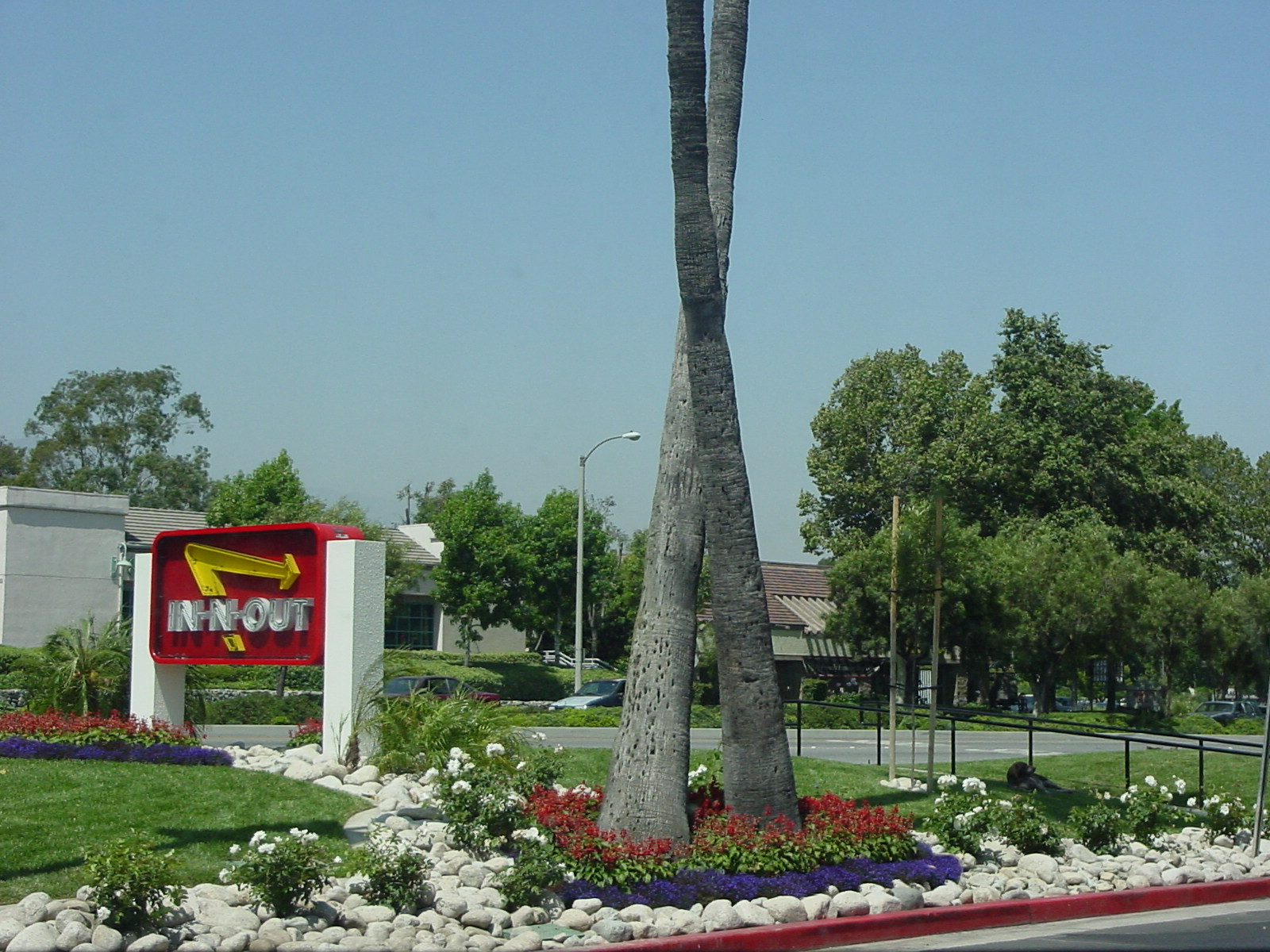
Example of In-N-Out's crossed palm trees

Additional design elements are common among contemporary In-N-Out locations. Matching In-N-Out's California-inspired palm tree theme, palm trees are sometimes planted to form an "X" in front of the restaurants. This is an allusion to founder Harry Snyder's favorite movie, Stanley Kramer's It's a Mad, Mad, Mad, Mad World, in which the characters look for a hidden treasure and find it under "the big W" made by four palm trees, with the middle two forming an "X".

== Advertising ==
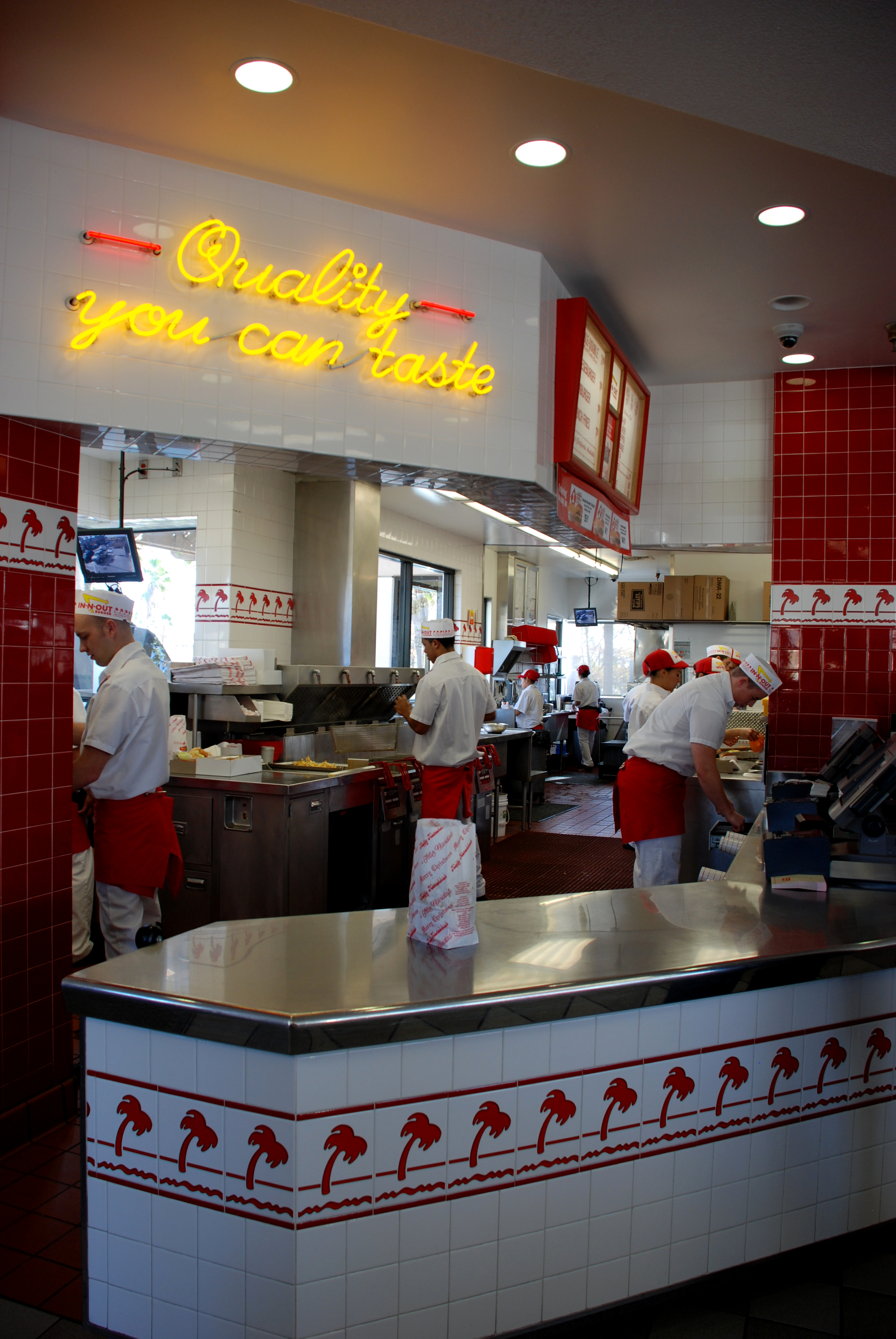
A typical interior with the company's motto, "Quality you can taste"

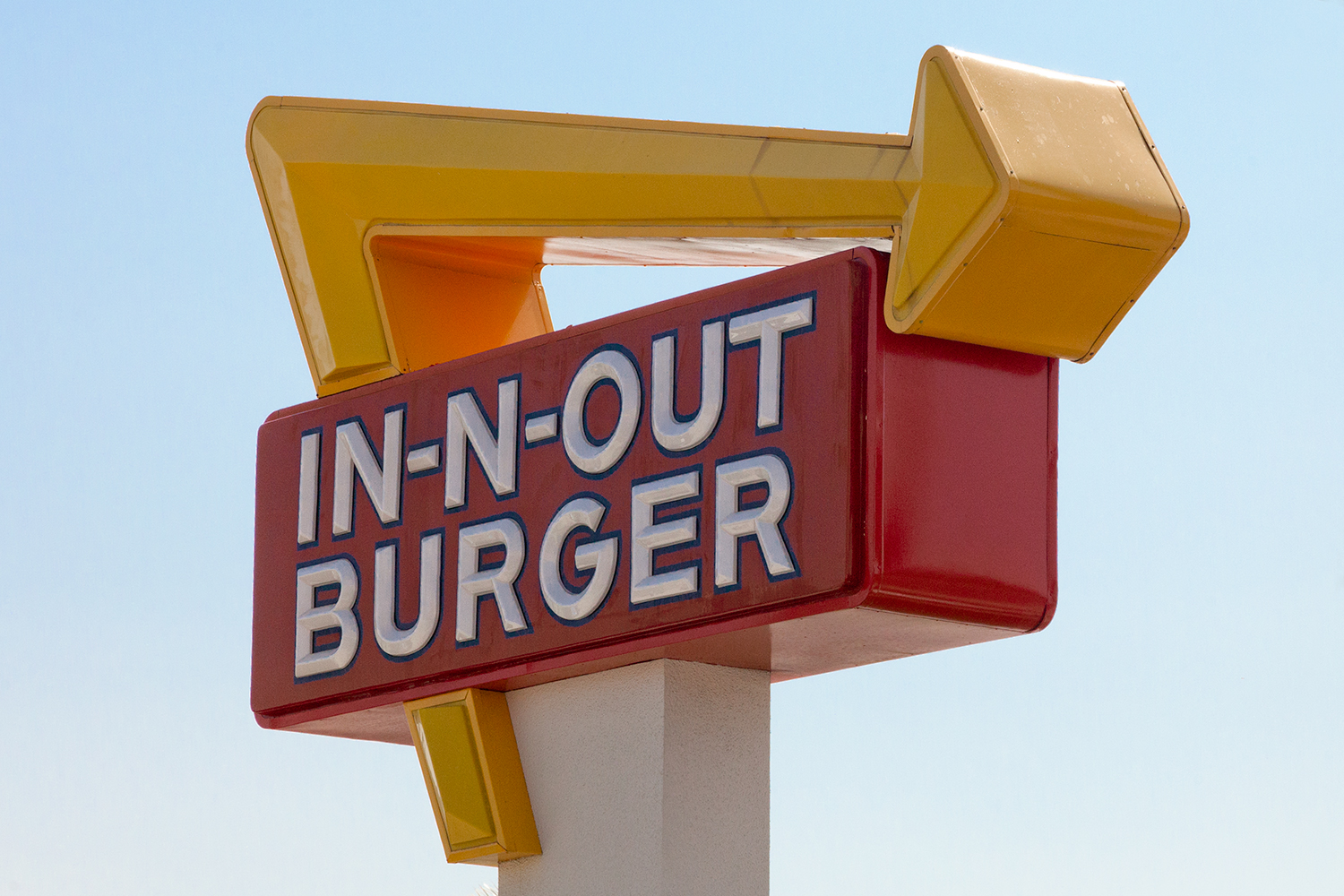
In-N-Out Burger sign in Los Angeles

Like other fast-food chains, In-N-Out uses roadside billboards that direct customers to the nearest location. Billboard ads display an image of the trademarked Double-Double burger. The chain uses short radio commercials, often limited to the song "In-N-Out, In-N-Out. That's what a hamburger's all about." Television commercials, which are less common, feature the hamburger's visual appeal. In-N-Out seldom uses celebrities in ads, although John Cleese and John Goodman have voiced radio spots. In the past, the Snyders also sponsored Christmas music programming with voice-overs expressing the meaning of the holiday.

In addition to commercials, In-N-Out benefits from enthusiastic fans who talk to each other. For many years, it has given customers free bumper stickers, which simply say "In-N-Out Burger" but are commonly modified to say "In-N-Out urge". The company helps devoted customers advertise its brand by selling souvenir clothing with the In-N-Out logo. Celebrity fans and free endorsements in mass media also promote the business. When Heisman Trophy winner and Ohio State quarterback Troy Smith raved about In-N-Out cheeseburgers during a press conference before the 2007 BCS National Championship Game, a senior executive said: "It does not get much better than that for us. We're kind of a small company, and we do not have any celebrity endorsers. But I think we just got the best one we could have." Huell Howser was allowed, in what is believed to be a first, to film with his television cameras inside a store for a California's Gold Special. The show also included a behind-the-scenes tour of the In-N-Out Headquarters. Gift items are sold at an In-N-Out "Company Store" near the chain's birthplace in Baldwin Park, California. A replica of the first store from 1948 was unveiled near the original site in 2014.

== Culture ==
=== Popularity ===
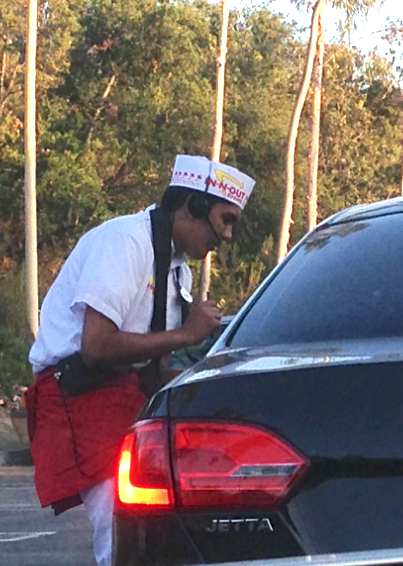
Mobile point of sale systems are used during peak hours to help curb long drive-thru lines.

The restaurant has achieved popularity which has led to celebration by some when brought to new locations, and the opening of a new restaurant often becomes an event. When one opened in Scottsdale, Arizona, there was a four-hour wait for food, and news helicopters whirled above the parking lot. When the first location in the state of Colorado opened in Aurora in 2020 wait times exceeded fourteen hours and local police had to assist with traffic control.

The chain's image has also made it popular in some unusual ways. For example, In-N-Out is still considered acceptable in some areas with strong opposition to corporate food restaurants, such as McDonald's. Commercial leaders in San Francisco's Fisherman's Wharf district said they opposed every other fast-food chain except In-N-Out because they wanted to maintain the flavor of family-owned, decades-old businesses in the area, with one saying locals would ordinarily "be up in arms about a fast-food operation coming to Fisherman's Wharf," but "this is different." California native and Colorado Rockies player Jason Giambi would often visit In-N-Out Burger when on the West Coast with his former team, the New York Yankees. He said he tried to open an In-N-Out Burger restaurant in New York but was unsuccessful.

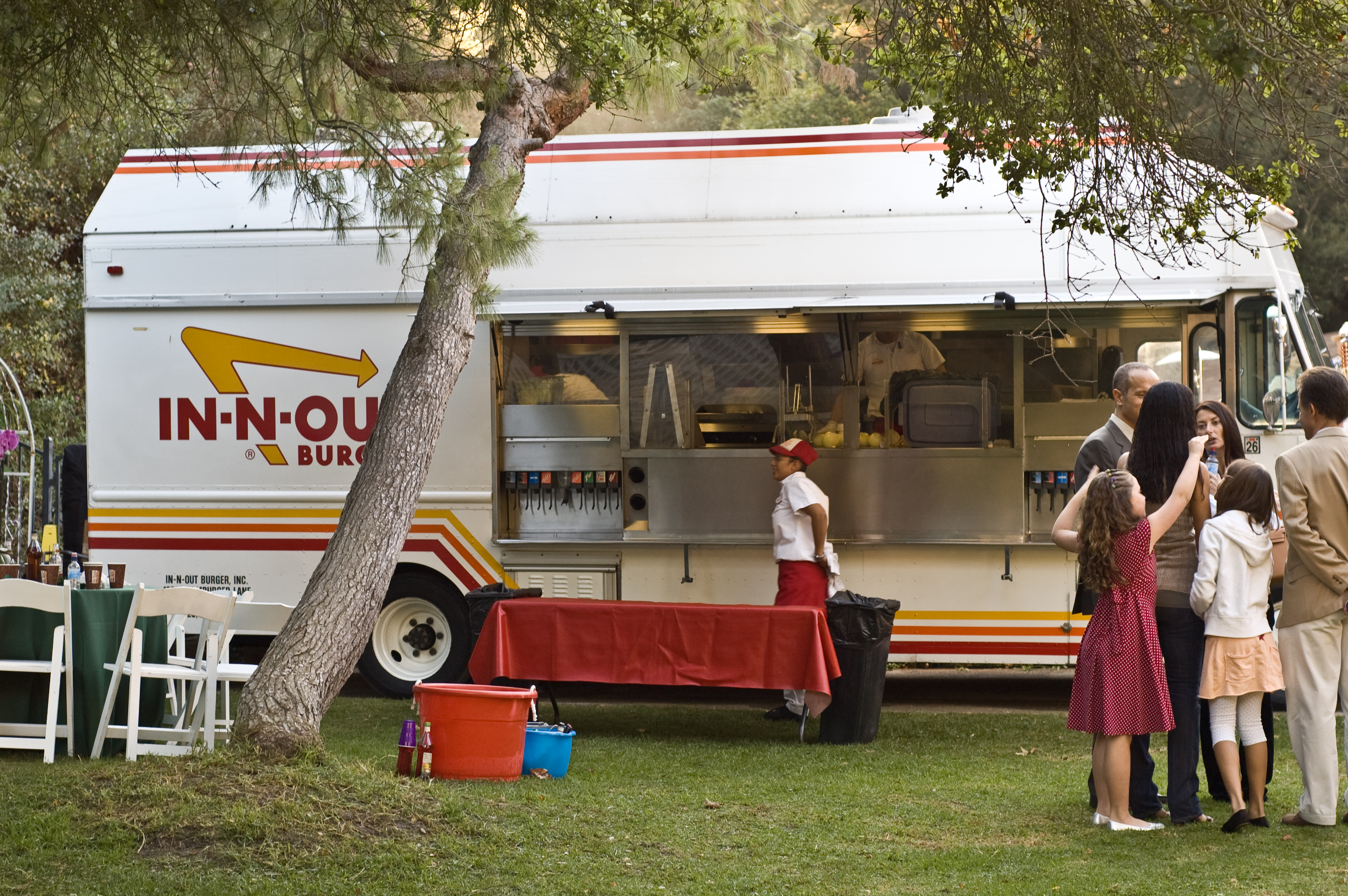
In-N-Out offers mobile catering in some Southern California markets.

The chain also has fans in a number of renowned chefs including Gordon Ramsay, Thomas Keller, Julia Child, Anthony Bourdain, Ina Garten, and Mario Batali. Famous London chef and restaurateur Ramsay ate In-N-Out for the first time when taping Hell's Kitchen in Los Angeles, and it soon became one of his favorite spots for take-out. Ramsay was quoted, saying about the experience: "In-N-Out burgers were extraordinary. I was so bad, I sat in the restaurant, had my double cheeseburger then minutes later I drove back round and got the same thing again to take away." Thomas Keller, a fan of In-N-Out, celebrated with In-N-Out burgers at the anniversary party of his restaurant, The French Laundry. Keller also plans on opening his own burger restaurant inspired by his Los Angeles experience of In-N-Out. Julia Child, one of the first celebrities to champion the chain, admitted to knowing every location of the restaurant between Santa Barbara and San Francisco. Child also had the burgers delivered to her during a hospital stay. Anthony Bourdain reportedly said that In-N-Out was his favorite fast food meal, later naming the restaurant as "the best restaurant in Los Angeles". Ina Garten at an interview at Today show said "I have to say, I don't eat fast food at all, with one exception. When we're in California doing book tours, we always have to go to In-N-Out Burger. It's so good and I know it was Julia Child's favorite too, so it's okay."

In-N-Out was one of the few restaurant chains mentioned positively in the book Fast Food Nation. The book commended the chain for using natural and fresh ingredients and for looking after the interests of employees regarding pay and benefits. An In-N-Out food truck catered Vanity Fair's 2012 Academy Awards after party.

=== Art ===
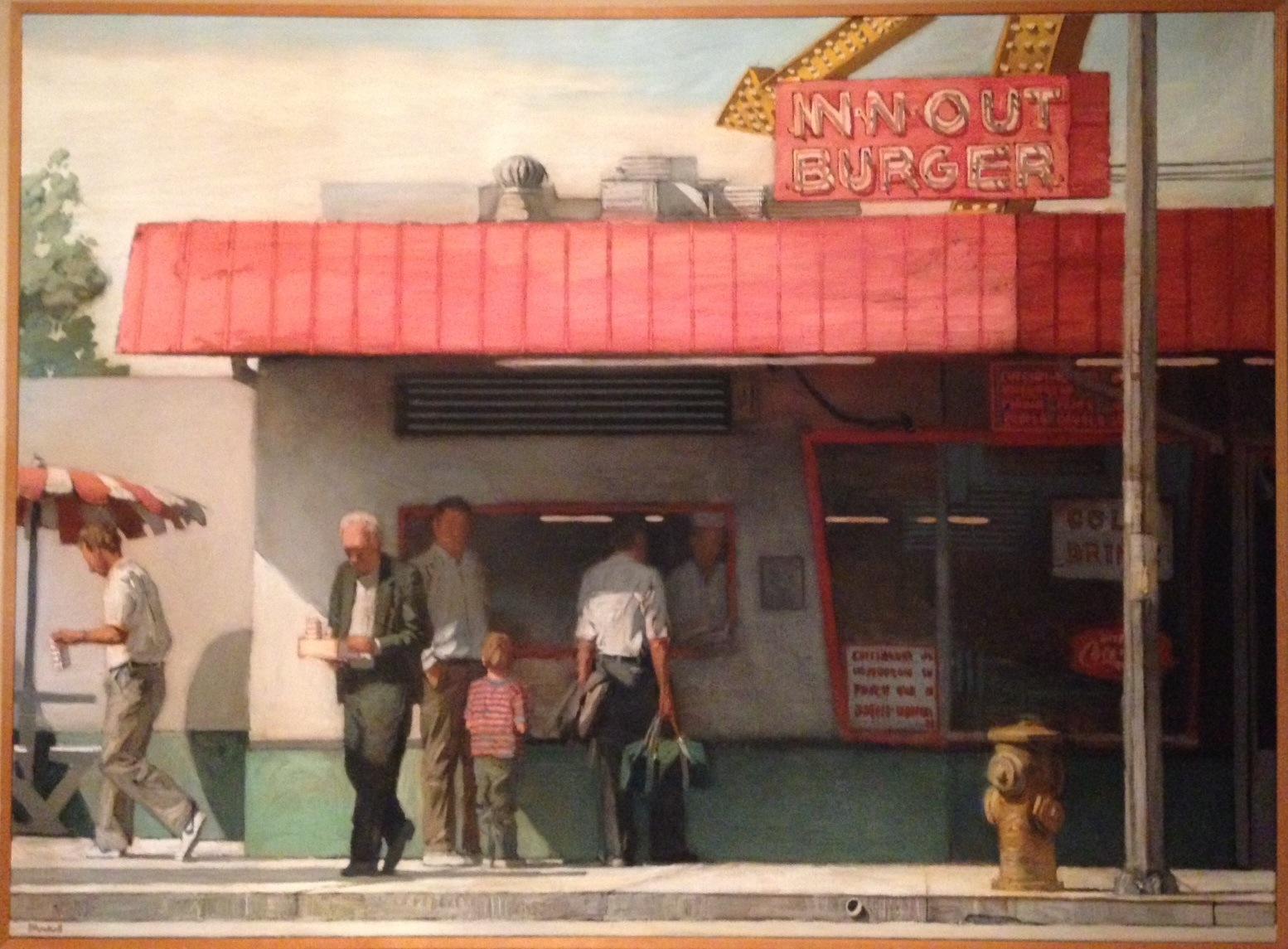
Richard Bunkall painting commissioned by Haenel family of In-N-Out Burger

Jack Schmidt was the first person commissioned to paint the original In-N-Out located in Baldwin Park, California for In-N-Out Burger Inc. His paintings were later reproduced on advertisements, shirts, and other consumer products. The 2022 shirt design was created by Palm Springs, California artist Danny Heller.

=== Bible verses ===
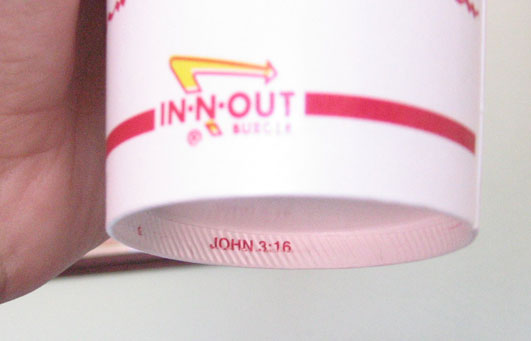
Bible reference on the bottom of an In-N-Out drink cup

In-N-Out prints Bible citations in small print on areas of packaging (such as "John 3:16", "Proverbs 3:5", "Proverbs 24:16", "Nahum 1:7", "Luke 6:35" and "Revelation 3:20"). They are primarily found on the bottom underside of drink cups and the wrappers that hold their burgers together. This practice began in the 1980s during Rich Snyder's presidency, a reflection of the evangelical Christian beliefs held by the Snyder family.

== Legal and policy issues ==
=== Rich Boyd lawsuit (2006) ===
In 2006, a lawsuit exposed a possible family disagreement over the chain's corporate leadership. Richard Boyd, one of In-N-Out's vice presidents and co-trustee of two-thirds of the company stock, accused Lynsi Snyder (then known as Lynsi Martinez) and allied corporate executives of trying to force out Esther Snyder and attempting to fire Boyd unreasonably. Pre-empting the suit, Martinez, Snyder, and Taylor appeared in a December video message to employees, telling them not to believe everything they hear. The company then responded with a lawsuit of its own, alleging Boyd had construction work done on his personal property and charged it to the company, as well as favoring contractors with uncompetitive bids. Boyd was then suspended from his role as co-trustee and Northern Trust Bank of California took his place (as co-trustee) until a hearing set for May 10, 2006. However, in April, the judge dismissed two of In-N-Out's claims against Boyd. A trial date of October 17, 2006, was set but never occurred, and a settlement was reached out of court. Ultimately, Boyd was permanently removed from his role as an employee and co-trustee.

=== Chadder's infringement lawsuit (2007) ===
In June 2007, the company filed a lawsuit against an American Fork, Utah, restaurant named Chadder's for trademark infringement, claiming that the "look and feel" of the restaurant too closely resembled that of In-N-Out, and that the restaurant violated trademarked menu items, such as "Animal Style", "Protein Style", and the "Double-Double".

The company learned about this from Utah customers contacting the customer service department asking if In-N-Out opened a location in Utah under a different name or if they had any affiliation with the restaurant in any way. Several customers stated they ordered trademarked items such as Animal and Protein styles. Utah District Court Judge Ted Stewart issued a temporary restraining order against the look-alike. Chadder's opened another location near the Salt Lake City area and one in Provo.

In 2009, In-N-Out opened a restaurant in American Fork less than a mile from the Chadder's restaurant. Per their website, Chadder's started selling a "Stubby Double" instead of "Double Double". The Chadder's restaurants in Utah have gone out of business since In-N-Out restaurants have opened in Utah.

=== Mexico ===
In 2023, a knock-off of In-N-Out appeared on Instagram displaying images of its restaurant, named In-I-Nout, in Culiacan, Mexico. Besides the name, the restaurant's logo, design, menu, and food presentation closely resembled that of the U.S. original. Threatened with legal action, the Mexican imitator changed its name to Sofi's Burger.

=== Australia ===
In-N-Out Burger has also had other similarly named imitators in Australia that confuse consumers into thinking that the businesses is associated with the Californian-based chain. The company would take the imitators to court for trademark infringement and has opened one-day pop-ups in Sydney in 2012, 2013, 2016, 2017, 2019, and 2022; Brisbane in 2020; Melbourne in 2014 and 2018; and Perth in 2018 and 2022 to preserve their trademark rights. Customers may wait for several hours before the doors open, but the food would run out very quickly, sometimes in less than hour after opening. Although In-N-Out may not have plans to open a permanent location outside its current operating region, the business strategy of having one-day pop-ups is to maintain a business presence in the country under Australian trademark law without opening a permanent restaurant.

In-N-Out successfully defended their trademarks and intellectual property rights in Australia in 2020 against Hashtag Burgers Pty Ltd, formerly doing business as "Funk N Burgers" and "Down-N-Out Burger". In 2021, In-N-Out filed a lawsuit against Queensland-based Rich Asians Pty Ltd doing business as "In & Out Aussie Burgers".

=== Global ===
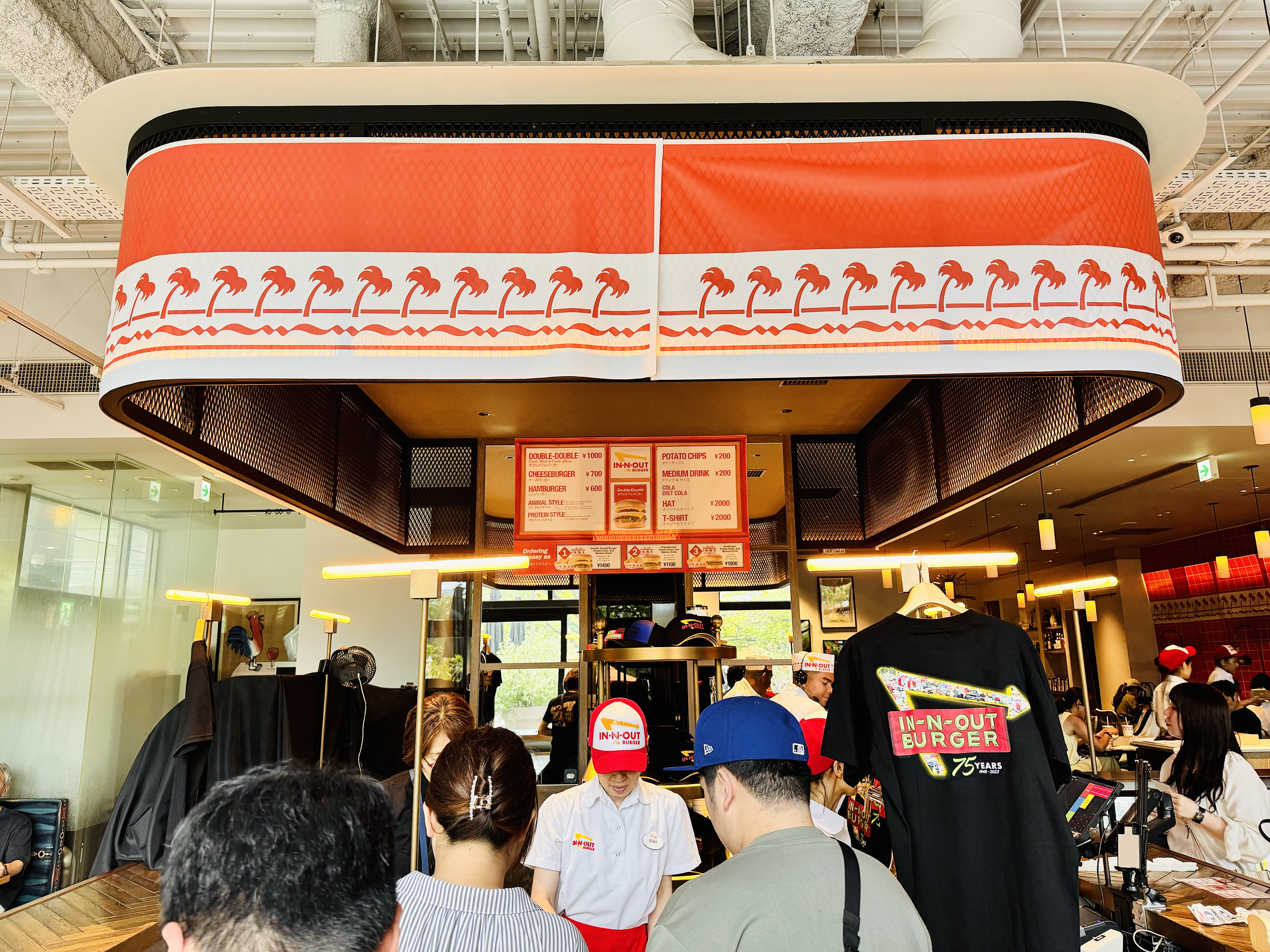
In-N-Out pop-up in Tokyo, Japan

In-N-Out has operated one-day popups to protect their intellectual property in countries around the world, such as Tokyo in 2012; Singapore in 2012 and 2019; Toronto in 2014 and 2021; Hong Kong in 2015; Taipei, Buenos Aires and Cape Town in 2016; London in 2016 and 2018; Shanghai and Vienna in 2017; Bangkok and Petaling Jaya in 2018; Vancouver and Seoul in 2019; Auckland in 2020; Dublin and Dubai in 2021; and Berlin in 2022.

=== DoorDash lawsuit (2015) ===
On November 6, 2015, In-N-Out filed a lawsuit against food delivery startup DoorDash, claiming trademark infringement. Two months later, the lawsuit was settled out of court in a confidential settlement. DoorDash no longer delivers food from In-N-Out Burger.

=== Political donations (2018) ===
In 2018, In-N-Out faced calls for boycott after donating $25,000 to the California GOP ahead of the November elections, as well as $30,000 in August 2017 and another $30,000 in May 2016.

=== Opposition to COVID-19 vaccine requirements (2021) ===
In October 2021, the In-N-Out location in San Francisco was ordered closed by the San Francisco Department of Public Health (SFDPH), for failure to enforce the public health order requiring that all dine-in patrons of restaurants present proof that they are fully vaccinated for COVID-19. The location had posted signage warning of the mandate, but the SFDPH received complaints that it was not actually enforced. The company's chief legal officer Arnie Wensinger stated that the company "fiercely disagree[s] with any government dictate that forces a private company to discriminate against customers who choose to patronize their business". The location was allowed to re-open for takeout service only until it demonstrates "an adequate process and procedure for complying with the health order". Later that month, after an In-N-Out location in Contra Costa County was similarly ordered closed by public health for not complying with its vaccine mandate, all In-N-Out locations in the region closed their dining rooms and began operating with takeout service only. The locations attracted anti-mandate demonstrations in support of the company.

=== Opposition to use of face masks by employees (2023) ===
In July 2023, the company announced that employees in Nevada, Arizona, Utah, Texas and Colorado would not be allowed to wear protective face masks at work, unless they could prove a valid medical exemption. The stated reason was to "emphasize the importance of customer service and the ability to show our associates' smiles and other facial features", according to a company memo. The company's communications department sent a statement from chief operating officer Denny Warnick to SFGATE: "We believe that wearing a mask literally adds a barrier to communication — much of which is nonverbal — and promotes a more distant and disconnected environment."

== Charity ==
=== In-N-Out Burgers Foundation ===
In-N-Out Burgers Foundation (known from March 13–April 14 1995 as The In-N-Out Foundation) is a 501(c)(3) nonprofit organization founded on March 13, 1995, and classified as a "Human Services: Fund Raising & Fund Distribution" organization under the NTEE system. Based in Irvine, California, the foundation "supports organizations that provide residential treatment, emergency shelter, foster care, and early intervention for children in need". Its grant-making activities are restricted to eligible nonprofit groups that are located or provide services in areas where In-N-Out has a presence. Consequently, grant proposals are only accepted from applicants in a limited number of counties in Arizona, California, Nevada, Utah, Texas. In 2010, the most recent year for which financial reporting is publicly available (and before the opening of the company's Texas locations), the foundation contributed $1,545,250 to 231 grantees in Arizona, California, Nevada, Utah. Grant-making is funded through donor contributions and In-N-Out-sponsored fundraisers; typical grants are between $2,000 and $20,000.

=== Slave 2 Nothing ===
In-N-Out Burger founded the Slave 2 Nothing Foundation in 2016 to "improve the lives of individuals and families affected by substance abuse and/or human trafficking".

== Original restaurant ==
The first In-N-Out restaurant that opened in 1948 was demolished when Interstate 10 (then US 60/US 70/US 99, the Ramona Freeway, now the San Bernardino Freeway) was built from downtown Los Angeles to the San Gabriel Valley. The freeway runs over the original location. A new restaurant was completed in 1954 near the original Baldwin Park, California, location. It was closed in November 2004 and demolished on April 16, 2011, despite discussions about using it as an In-N-Out museum chronicling the origins and history of the company. In-N-Out built a replacement restaurant on the other side of the freeway next to the original In-N-Out University (opened in 1984). A new In-N-Out University was built on the property. The university building houses the training department, which was moved from Irvine, California. In addition, the company restaurant was moved from In-N-Out's Baldwin Park headquarters to the new lot, which holds the restaurant and university, less than a thousand feet away. In 2014, a replica of the first In-N-Out was built in Baldwin Park.

== Awards and honors ==
In-N-Out Burger was ranked number 28 among America's Best Employers 2019 by Forbes. According to a survey by Glassdoor in 2014, In-N-Out Burger ranked No. 8 on its annual list of the 50 best places to work in the U.S. and the U.K. The company reached No. 6 in Glassdoor's 2024 Top 100 Ranking.

== See also ==
- Burger wars – Series of fast food advertising campaigns
- List of hamburger restaurants
- List of restaurant chains in the United States
