= 1984 New England Patriots season =

Season of National Football League team the New England Patriots

- Owner: Billy Sullivan
- General manager: Patrick Sullivan
- Head coach: Ron Meyer (fired October 25th; 5-3 record); Raymond Berry (interim; 4-4 record)
- Home stadium: Sullivan Stadium

Results
- Record: 9–7
- Division place: 2nd AFC East
- Playoffs: Did not qualify
- All-Pros: G John Hannah (2nd team)
- Pro Bowlers: G John Hannah; T Brian Holloway; LB Steve Nelson; LB Andre Tippett

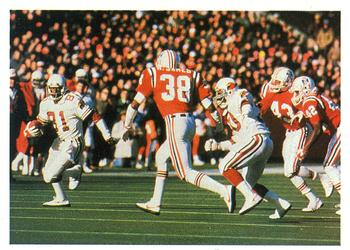
The Patriots hosting the Cardinals in December 1984.

The 1984 New England Patriots season was the franchise's 15th season in the National Football League and 25th overall. The Patriots finished the season with a record of nine wins and seven losses, and finished second in the AFC East Division.

Head coach Ron Meyer, who had coached the Patriots for the previous two seasons, was fired halfway through the season. Meyer had angered several of his players with public criticism. After a 44–24 loss to Miami in week 8, Meyer fired popular defensive coordinator Rod Rust; Meyer himself was fired by Patriots management shortly thereafter.

The Patriots went outside the organization to hire Raymond Berry, who had been New England's receivers coach from 1978 to 1981 under coaches Chuck Fairbanks and Ron Erhardt. Berry had been working in the private sector in Medfield, Massachusetts, when the Patriots called him to replace Meyer. Berry's first order of business was to immediately rehire Rust.

Under Berry's leadership, the Patriots won four of their last eight games. Berry's importance to the team was reflected less in his initial win–loss record than in the respect he immediately earned in the locker room – "Raymond Berry earned more respect in one day than Ron Meyer earned in three years," according to running back Tony Collins.

== Offseason ==
=== NFL draft ===
1984 New England Patriots draft
Round	Pick	Player	Position	College	Notes
1	1	Irving Fryar *	Wide receiver	Nebraska	
Made roster * Made at least one Pro Bowl during career

== Staff ==
New England Patriots 1984 staff
Front office: President – Billy Sullivan; Executive vice president – Chuck Sullivan; Vice-president – Bucko Kilroy; General manager – Patrick Sullivan; Director of player development – Dick Steinberg; Director of college scouting – Joe Mendes; Director of pro scouting – Bill McPeak; Head coaches: Head coach – Ron Meyer; Interim head coach – Raymond Berry; Offensive coaches: Offensive coordinator/quarterbacks – Lew Erber; Offensive backs – Cleve Bryant; Receivers – Steve Endicott; Offensive line – Bill Muir	Defensive coaches: Defensive coordinator – Rod Rust; Defensive line – Tommy Brasher; Linebackers – Steve Sidwell; Secondary – Steve Walters; Special teams coaches: Special teams/tight ends – Dante Scarnecchia; Strength and conditioning: Strength and conditioning – LeBaron Caruthers

== Roster ==
New England Patriots 1984 roster
Quarterbacks: 11 Tony Eason; 14 Steve Grogan; 19 Mike Kerrigan; Running backs: 33 Tony Collins; 40 Greg Hawthorne; 32 Craig James; 30 Mosi Tatupu; 24 Robert Weathers; Wide receivers: 80 Irving Fryar; 83 Cedric Jones; 86 Stanley Morgan; 81 Stephen Starring; 82 Clarence Weathers; Tight ends: 87 Lin Dawson; 88 Derrick Ramsey; 41 Bo Robinson	Offensive linemen: 58 Pete Brock C; 66 Paul Fairchild G; 73 John Hannah G; 68 Darryl Haley T; 76 Brian Holloway T; 67 Steve Moore T; 75 Guy Morriss C; 61 Ron Wooten G; Defensive linemen: 85 Julius Adams DE; 60 Luther Henson NT; 98 Dennis Owens NT; 65 Doug Rogers DE; 77 Kenneth Sims DE; 90 Toby Williams DE	Linebackers: 55 Don Blackmon OLB; 59 Tim Golden ILB; 51 Brian Ingram OLB; 50 Larry McGrew ILB; 57 Steve Nelson ILB; 52 Johnny Rembert ILB; 95 Ed Reynolds ILB; 56 Andre Tippett OLB; 54 Ed Williams OLB; Defensive backs: 26 Raymond Clayborn CB; 43 Ernest Gibson CB; 38 Roland James SS; 22 Keith Lee CB/S; 42 Ronnie Lippett CB; 31 Fred Marion FS; 31 Rod McSwain CB; 25 Rick Sanford FS; Special teams: 3 Rich Camarillo P; 1 Tony Franklin K	Reserve lists: 46 John Andredi LB (IR); 92 Smiley Creswell DE (IR); 91 George Crump DE (PUP); 47 Paul Dombroski CB/S (IR); 12 Tom Ramsey QB (IR); 53 Clayton Weishuhn LB (IR); 46 Craig Williams RB (IR); 21 Derwin Williams WR (IR); 44 Jon Williams RB (IR); 72 Lester Williams NT (IR); 48 Darryal Wilson WR (PUP); 93 David Windham LB (IR); Rookies in italics

== Regular season ==
=== Schedule ===
Week	Date	Opponent	Result	Record	Venue	Attendance
1	September 2	at **Buffalo Bills**	**W** 21–17	1–0	Rich Stadium	48,528
2	September 9	at **Miami Dolphins**	**L** 7–28	1–1	Miami Orange Bowl	66,083
3	September 16	Seattle Seahawks	**W** 38–23	2–1	Sullivan Stadium	43,140
4	September 23	Washington Redskins	**L** 10–26	2–2	Sullivan Stadium	60,503
5	September 30	at **New York Jets**	**W** 28–21	3–2	Giants Stadium	68,978
6	October 7	at Cleveland Browns	**W** 17–16	4–2	Cleveland Municipal Stadium	53,036
7	October 14	Cincinnati Bengals	**W** 20–14	5–2	Sullivan Stadium	48,154
8	October 21	**Miami Dolphins**	**L** 24–44	5–3	Sullivan Stadium	60,711
9	October 28	**New York Jets**	**W** 30–20	6–3	Sullivan Stadium	60,513
10	November 4	at Denver Broncos	**L** 19–26	6–4	Mile High Stadium	74,908
11	November 11	**Buffalo Bills**	**W** 38–10	7–4	Sullivan Stadium	43,313
12	November 18	at **Indianapolis Colts**	**W** 50–17	8–4	Hoosier Dome	60,009
13	November 22	at Dallas Cowboys	**L** 17–20	8–5	Texas Stadium	55,341
14	December 2	St. Louis Cardinals	**L** 10–33	8–6	Sullivan Stadium	53,558
15	December 9	at Philadelphia Eagles	**L** 17–27	8–7	Veterans Stadium	41,581
16	December 16	**Indianapolis Colts**	**W** 16–10	9–7	Sullivan Stadium	22,383
Note: Intra-division opponents are in **bold** text.

=== Season summary ===
==== Week 1 ====
Behind two Steve Grogan touchdown throws, the Patriots raced to a 21–0 lead. They withstood a second-half Bills comeback attempt, and won 21–17.

==== Week 2 (Sunday, September 9, 1984): at Miami Dolphins ====
Week 2: New England Patriots at Miami Dolphins

Quarter	1	2	3	4	Total
Patriots (1–1)	0	7	0	0	**7**
Dolphins (2–0)	0	7	14	7	**28**

at Miami Orange Bowl • Miami, Florida

- Date: September 9, 1984
- Game time: 1:02 p.m. EDT
- Game weather: 79 °F (26 °C); relative humidity 65%; wind 10 miles per hour (16 km/h; 8.7 kn)
- Game attendance: 66,083
- Referee: Chuck Heberling
- TV announcers (NBC): Jay Randolph (play-by-play) and Bob Griese (color commentator)
- Pro-Football-Reference.com

Team	Category	Player	Statistics
NE	Passing	Steve Grogan	20/42, 217 YDS, 1 TD, 4 INTs
NE	Rushing	Tony Collins	20 CAR, 87 YDS
NE	Receiving	Derrick Ramsey	5 REC, 70 YDS
MIA	Passing	Dan Marino	17/28, 269 YDS, 3 TDs, 2 INTs
MIA	Rushing	Tony Nathan	10 CAR, 36 YDS
MIA	Receiving	Mark Clayton	5 REC, 75 YDS, 2 TDs

Scoring summary

Quarter	Time	Drive			Team	Scoring information	Score	
Quarter	Time	Plays	Yards	TOP	Team	Scoring information	NE	MIA
2	5:37	2	55	0:16	Dolphins	Duper 35-yard touchdown reception from Jensen, von Schamann kick good	0	7
2	0:56	10	90	4:31	Patriots	Dawson 5-yard touchdown reception from Grogan, Franklin kick good	7	7
3	12:38	4	73	2:22	Dolphins	Clayton 35-yard touchdown reception from Marino, von Schamann kick good	7	14
3	11:02	2	16	0:43	Dolphins	Clayton 15-yard touchdown reception from Marino, von Schamann kick good	7	21
4	2:53	—	—	—	Dolphins	Interception returned 60 yards for touchdown by Judson, von Schamann kick good	7	28
"TOP" = time of possession. For other American football terms, see Glossary of American football.							7	28

- Point spread: Dolphins by 6
- Over/under: 43.0 **(under)**
- Time of game: 3 hours, 3 minutes

Patriots	Game statistics	Dolphins
18	First downs	17
28–127	Rushes–yards	30–74
217	Passing yards	269
20–42–4	Passes	17–28–2
2–12	Sacked–yards	0–0
205	Net passing yards	269
332	Total yards	343
74	Return yards	183
8–39.6	Punts	5–41.6
2–1	Fumbles–lost	0–0
6–53	Penalties–yards	6–46
30:46	Time of Possession	29:14

Grogan had a miserable day as he was intercepted four times; William Judson ran back one for a 60-yard touchdown. The Dolphins, led by two Dan Marino touchdown passes, won 28–7.

==== Week 3 ====
The first home game of the season ended Grogan's season as he failed to complete any of his four passes and Kenny Easley ran back his interception for a 25-yard touchdown. The Seahawks scored three touchdowns marred by a missed PAT. Tony Eason replaced Grogan with six minutes left in the first half and in the final minute ran in a 25-yard touchdown. From there three Patriots backs rushed for 189 yards and three touchdowns and Eason tossed scores to Derrick Ramsey and Irving Fryar while Dave Krieg of the Seahawks was bullied into two interceptions. The Patriots came back to win 38–23. The 23-point comeback was the largest in Patriots franchise history, a team record held until 2013.

==== Week 8 (Sunday, October 21, 1984): vs. Miami Dolphins ====
Week 8: Miami Dolphins at New England Patriots

Quarter	1	2	3	4	Total
Dolphins (8–0)	3	13	14	14	**44**
Patriots (5–3)	3	7	7	7	**24**

at Sullivan Stadium • Foxborough, Massachusetts

- Date: October 21, 1984
- Game time: 1:00 p.m. EDT
- Game weather: 58 °F (14 °C); relative humidity 53%; wind 10 miles per hour (16 km/h; 8.7 kn)
- Game attendance: 60,711
- Referee: Jim Tunney
- TV announcers (NBC): Charlie Jones (play-by-play) and Bob Griese (color commentator)
- Pro-Football-Reference.com

Team	Category	Player	Statistics
MIA	Passing	Dan Marino	24/39, 316 YDS, 4 TDs, 1 INT
MIA	Rushing	Joe Carter	14 CAR, 92 YDS
MIA	Receiving	Mark Clayton	7 REC, 99 YDS, 1 TD
NE	Passing	Tony Eason	19/29, 313 YDS, 3 TDs
NE	Rushing	Mosi Tatupu	20 CAR, 90 YDS
NE	Receiving	Derrick Ramsey	5 REC, 32 YDS, 1 TD

Scoring summary

Quarter	Time	Drive			Team	Scoring information	Score	
Quarter	Time	Plays	Yards	TOP	Team	Scoring information	MIA	NE
1	8:33	13	74	3:55	Dolphins	28-yard field goal by von Schamann	3	0
1	2:33	12	49	5:54	Patriots	48-yard field goal by Franklin	3	3
2	14:32	7	65	2:51	Dolphins	Johnson 1-yard touchdown run, von Schamann kick good	10	3
2	1:55	8	66	4:03	Patriots	Weathers 14-yard touchdown reception from Eason, Franklin kick good	10	10
2	0:06	11	80	1:49	Dolphins	Moore 19-yard touchdown reception from Marino, von Schamann kick no good	16	10
3	6:40	13	80	8:20	Dolphins	Johnson 5-yard touchdown reception from Marino, von Schamann kick good	23	10
3	6:22	1	76	0:18	Patriots	Morgan 76-yard touchdown reception from Eason, Franklin kick good	23	17
3	2:31	7	75	2:51	Dolphins	Clayton 15-yard touchdown reception from Marino, von Schamann kick good	30	17
4	11:27	12	61	7:04	Patriots	Ramsey 5-yard touchdown reception from Eason, Franklin kick good	30	24
4	8:24	6	66	3:04	Dolphins	Moore 15-yard touchdown reception from Marino, von Schamann kick good	37	24
4	1:11	10	69	4:39	Dolphins	Johnson 3-yard touchdown run, von Schamann kick good	44	24
"TOP" = time of possession. For other American football terms, see Glossary of American football.							44	24

- Point spread: Dolphins by 4
- Over/under: 42.0 **(over)**
- Time of game: 3 hours, 13 minutes

Dolphins	Game statistics	Patriots
33	First downs	18
37–236	Rushes–yards	27–102
316	Passing yards	313
24–39–1	Passes	19–29–0
0–0	Sacked–yards	1–7
316	Net passing yards	306
552	Total yards	408
75	Return yards	113
1–38.0	Punts	3–57.0
0–0	Fumbles–lost	1–1
6–36	Penalties–yards	6–36
31:59	Time of Possession	28:01

==== Week 9 ====
New York Jets at New England Patriots

Team	1	2	3	4	Total
Jets	10	10	0	0	20
• **Patriots**	0	6	10	14	30

- Date: October 28
- Location: Sullivan Stadium, Foxboro, Massachusetts
- Game start: 1:00 p.m. EST
- Game weather: 59 °F (15 °C), wind 13 mph (21 km/h)
- Referee: Chuck Heberling
- Source: Pro-Football-Reference.com

Scoring summary
1	Jets	Pat Leahy 46-yard field goal	Jets 3–0
1	Jets	Rocky Klever 7-yard pass from Ken O'Brien (Pat Leahy kick)	Jets 10–0
2	Patriots	Tony Franklin 20-yard field goal	Jets 10–3
2	Jets	Pat Leahy 18-yard field goal	Jets 13–3
2	Jets	Marion Barber 2-yard run (Pat Leahy kick)	Jets 20–3
2	Patriots	Tony Franklin 27-yard field goal	Jets 20–6
3	Patriots	Tony Franklin 47-yard field goal	Jets 20–9
3	Patriots	Craig James 25-yard run (Tony Franklin kick)	Jets 20–16
4	Patriots	Stephen Starring 5-yard pass from Tony Eason (Tony Franklin kick)	Patriots 23–20
4	Patriots	Tony Collins 4-yard run (Tony Franklin kick)	Patriots 30–20

Raymond Berry's first game as Patriots' head coach.

=== Standings ===
AFC East
	W	L	T	PCT	DIV	CONF	PF	PA	STK
Miami Dolphins^{(1)}	14	2	0	.875	8–0	10–2	513	298	W2
New England Patriots	9	7	0	.563	6–2	9–3	362	352	W1
New York Jets	7	9	0	.438	3–5	7–7	332	364	L1
Indianapolis Colts	4	12	0	.250	2–6	4–8	239	414	L5
Buffalo Bills	2	14	0	.125	1–7	1–11	250	454	L2
