= 1984 Dallas Cowboys season =

NFL team season

- Owner: Bum Bright
- General manager: Tex Schramm
- Head coach: Tom Landry
- Home stadium: Texas Stadium

Results
- Record: 9–7
- Division place: 4th NFC East
- Playoffs: Did not qualify
- Pro Bowlers: 3

The 1984 Dallas Cowboys season was the team's 25th in the National Football League. The Cowboys finished the season with a record of 9–7, and missed the playoffs for the first time since 1974. A division record of 3–5 caused them to finish fourth in the NFC East, despite equaling the overall records of the New York Giants and St. Louis Cardinals.

After 14 games, the Cowboys had a 9–5 record and would have made the playoffs had they won one of their two remaining games, or win the division had they won both games. However, the team gave up a 15-point lead against the Washington Redskins in week 15, and then lost to the Miami Dolphins by a touchdown surrendered with less than a minute to play in the final week of the season. The season was overshadowed by a quarterback controversy between Danny White and Gary Hogeboom, with Hogeboom getting the majority of the starts.

The season's nadir occurred in week 12, when the 0–11 Buffalo Bills defeated the visiting Cowboys 14–3.

== Offseason ==
The Cowboys went through major changes during the offseason, as key players Drew Pearson, Billy Joe Dupree, Harvey Martin, Robert Newhouse, and Pat Donovan all retired, and Butch Johnson was traded to the Denver Broncos. Bum Bright bought the team from Clint Murchison Jr.

=== NFL draft ===
1984 Dallas Cowboys draft
Round	Pick	Player	Position	College	Notes
1	25	Billy Cannon Jr.	LB	Texas A&M	
2	40	Victor Scott	S	Colorado	
3	81	Fred Cornwell	TE	USC	
4	110	Steve DeOssie	LB	Boston College	
5	113	Steve Pelluer	QB	Washington	
5	137	Norm Granger	FB	Iowa	
6	152	Eugene Lockhart	LB	Houston	
6	166	Joe Levelis	OG	Iowa	Signed with the USFL
7	193	Ed Martin	LB	Indiana State	Signed with the USFL
8	222	Mike Revell	RB	Bethune-Cookman	
9	232	John Hunt	OG	Florida	
9	249	Neil Maune	OG	Notre Dame	
10	278	Brian Salonen	TE	Montana	
11	305	Dowe Aughtman	DT	Auburn	
12	334	Carl Lewis	WR	Houston	He never played American football
Made roster † Pro Football Hall of Fame * Made at least one Pro Bowl during career

== Roster ==
Dallas Cowboys 1984 roster
Quarterbacks: 14 Gary Hogeboom; 16 Steve Pelluer; 11 Danny White P; Running backs: 31 Gary Allen; 33 Tony Dorsett; 28 Norm Granger; 23 James Jones; 35 Chuck McSwain; 30 Timmy Newsome; 20 Ron Springs; Wide receivers: 83 Doug Donley; 86 Duriel Harris; 80 Tony Hill; 81 Kirk Phillips; 82 Mike Renfro; Tight ends: 85 Fred Cornwell; 84 Doug Cosbie; 89 Brian Salonen	Offensive linemen: 76 Dowe Aughtman G; 62 Brian Baldinger G/T; 79 John Hunt G; 73 Syd Kitson C/G; 65 Kurt Petersen G; 75 Phil Pozderac T; 64 Tom Rafferty C; 68 Herbert Scott T/G; 63 Glen Titensor G; Defensive linemen: 78 John Dutton DT; 77 Jim Jeffcoat DE; 72 Ed Jones DE; 60 Don Smerek DT; 71 Mark Tuinei DT; 54 Randy White DT	Linebackers: 55 Steve DeOssie MLB; 51 Anthony Dickerson OLB; 58 Mike Hegman OLB; 56 Eugene Lockhart MLB; 50 Jeff Rohrer OLB; 57 Jimmie Turner OLB; Defensive backs: 36 Vince Albritton SS; 40 Bill Bates SS; 47 Dextor Clinkscale SS; 26 Michael Downs FS; 27 Ron Fellows CB; 22 Victor Scott CB; 32 Dennis Thurman FS; 24 Everson Walls CB; Special teams: 1 Rafael Septién K; 5 John Warren P	Reserve lists: -- Chris Arendt DE (IR); 53 Bob Breunig LB (IR); 52 Billy Cannon Jr. OLB (IR); 61 Jim Cooper T (IR); 21 Carl Howard CB (IR); -- Ron Jenkins WR (IR); 70 Howard Richards T (IR); 66 Chris Schultz T (IR); Rookies in italics 49 active, 8 inactive

== Schedule ==
Week	Date	Opponent	Result	Record	Game Site	Attendance	Recap
1	September 3	at Los Angeles Rams	**W** 20–13	1–0	Anaheim Stadium	65,403	Recap
2	September 9	at **New York Giants**	**L** 7–28	1–1	Giants Stadium	75,921	Recap
3	September 16	**Philadelphia Eagles**	**W** 23–17	2–1	Texas Stadium	64,521	Recap
4	September 23	Green Bay Packers	**W** 20–6	3–1	Texas Stadium	64,222	Recap
5	September 30	at Chicago Bears	**W** 23–14	4–1	Soldier Field	63,623	Recap
6	October 7	**St. Louis Cardinals**	**L** 20–31	4–2	Texas Stadium	61,438	Recap
7	October 14	at **Washington Redskins**	**L** 14–34	4–3	RFK Stadium	55,431	Recap
8	October 21	New Orleans Saints	**W** 30–27 (OT)	5–3	Texas Stadium	50,966	Recap
9	October 28	Indianapolis Colts	**W** 22–3	6–3	Texas Stadium	58,724	Recap
10	November 4	**New York Giants**	**L** 7–19	6–4	Texas Stadium	60,235	Recap
11	November 11	at **St. Louis Cardinals**	**W** 24–17	7–4	Busch Stadium	48,721	Recap
12	November 18	at Buffalo Bills	**L** 3–14	7–5	Rich Stadium	74,391	Recap
13	November 22	New England Patriots	**W** 20–17	8–5	Texas Stadium	55,341	Recap
14	December 2	at **Philadelphia Eagles**	**W** 26–10	9–5	Veterans Stadium	66,322	Recap
15	December 9	**Washington Redskins**	**L** 28–30	9–6	Texas Stadium	64,286	Recap
16	December 17	at Miami Dolphins	**L** 21–28	9–7	Orange Bowl	74,139	Recap

Division opponents are in bold text

== Season summary ==
=== Week 1 ===
Week One: Dallas Cowboys at Los Angeles Rams – Game summary

Quarter	1	2	3	4	Total
Cowboys (1-0)	0	7	3	10	20
Rams (0-1)	13	0	0	0	13

at Anaheim Stadium

- Date: Monday, September 3, 1984
- Game time: 9:00pm(ET)
- Game weather: 71 degrees, relative humidity 77%, wind 10 mph
- Game attendance: 65,403
- Referee: Jim Tunney
- TV announcers (ABC): Frank Gifford (play-by-play), Don Meredith and O. J. Simpson (color commentators)
- Pro-Football-Reference.com

=== Week 2 ===
Week Two: Dallas Cowboys at New York Giants – Game summary

Quarter	1	2	3	4	Total
Cowboys (1-1)	0	0	7	0	7
Giants (2-0)	14	7	7	0	28

at The Meadowlands

- Date: Sunday, September 9, 1984
- Game time: 1:00pm(ET)
- Game weather: 66 degrees, relative humidity 69%, wind 13 mph
- Game attendance: 75,921
- Referee: Jerry Seeman
- TV announcers (CBS): Jack Buck (play-by-play) and John Madden (color commentator)
- Pro-Football-Reference.com

=== Week 3 ===
Week Three: Philadelphia Eagles at Dallas Cowboys – Game summary

Quarter	1	2	3	4	Total
Eagles (1-2)	0	10	0	7	17
Cowboys (2-1)	3	10	10	0	23

at Texas Stadium

- Date: Sunday, September 16, 1984
- Game time: 4:00pm(ET)
- Game weather: 69 degrees, relative humidity 49%, wind 13 mph
- Game attendance: 64,521
- Referee: Chuck Heberling
- TV announcers (CBS): Dick Stockton (play-by-play) and Hank Stram (color commentator)
- Pro-Football-Reference.com

=== Week 4 ===
Week Four: Green Bay Packers at Dallas Cowboys – Game summary

Quarter	1	2	3	4	Total
Packers (1-3)	0	0	6	0	6
Cowboys (3-1)	7	6	0	7	20

at Texas Stadium

- Date: Sunday, September 23, 1984
- Game time: 4:00pm(ET)
- Game weather: 80 degrees, relative humidity 67%, wind 11 mph
- Game attendance: 64,222
- Referee: Bob McElwee
- TV announcers (CBS): Pat Summerall (play-by-play) and John Madden (color commentator)
- Pro-Football-Reference.com

=== Week 5 ===
Week Five: Dallas Cowboys at Chicago Bears – Game summary

Quarter	1	2	3	4	Total
Cowboys (4-1)	10	7	3	3	23
Bears (3-2)	7	7	0	0	14

at Soldier Field

- Date: Sunday, September 30, 1984
- Game time: 1:00pm(ET)
- Game weather: 44 degrees, relative humidity 64%, wind 7 mph
- Game attendance: 63,623
- Referee: Fred Wyant
- TV announcers (CBS): Pat Summerall (play-by-play) and John Madden (color commentator)
- Pro-Football-Reference.com

=== Week 6 ===
Week Six: St. Louis Cardinals at Dallas Cowboys – Game summary

Quarter	1	2	3	4	Total
Cardinals (3-3)	7	7	17	0	31
Cowboys (4-2)	7	6	0	7	20

at Texas Stadium

- Date: Sunday, October 7, 1984
- Game time: 1:00pm(ET)
- Game weather: 71 degrees, relative humidity 82%, wind 11 mph
- Game attendance: 61,438
- Referee: Dick Jorgensen
- TV announcers (CBS): Frank Glieber (play-by-play) and Dick Vermeil (color commentator)
- Pro-Football-Reference.com

=== Week 7 ===
Week Seven: Dallas Cowboys at Washington Redskins – Game summary

Quarter	1	2	3	4	Total
Cowboys (4-3)	7	0	0	7	14
Redskins (5-2)	7	10	10	7	34

at Robert F. Kennedy Memorial Stadium

- Date: Sunday, October 14, 1984
- Game time: 4:00pm(ET)
- Game weather: 63 degrees, relative humidity 61%, wind 14 mph
- Game attendance: 55,431
- Referee: Jerry Markbreit
- TV announcers (CBS): Pat Summerall (play-by-play) and John Madden (color commentator)
- Pro-Football-Reference.com

=== Week 8 ===
Week Eight: New Orleans Saints at Dallas Cowboys – Game summary

Quarter	1	2	3	4	OT	Total
Saints (3-5)	0	17	10	0	0	27
Cowboys (5-3)	3	3	0	21	3	30

at Texas Stadium

- Date: Sunday, October 21, 1984
- Game time: 9:45pm(ET)
- Game weather: 59 degrees, relative humidity 88%, wind 13 mph
- Game attendance: 50,966
- Referee: Pat Haggerty
- TV announcers (ABC): Frank Gifford (play-by-play), Don Meredith and O. J. Simpson (color commentators)
- Pro-Football-Reference.com

Game information

First quarter

- Cowboys – Rafael Septién 37 yard field goal – NOS 0, Dal 3

Second quarter

- Saints – Tyrone Young 36 yard pass from Richard Todd (Morten Andersen kick) – NOS 7, Dal 3
- Cowboys – Rafael Septién 27 yard field goal – NOS 7, Dal 6
- Saints – Hokie Gajan 62 yard rush (Morten Andersen kick) – NOS 14, Dal 6
- Saints – Morten Andersen 49 yard field goal – NOS 17, Dal 6

Third quarter

- Saints – Morten Andersen 50 yard field goal – NOS 20, Dal 6
- Saints – Dirt Winston 43 yard interception return (Morten Andersen kick) – NOS 27, Dal 6

Fourth quarter

- Cowboys – Tony Dorsett 3 yard rush (Rafael Septién kick) – NOS 27, Dal 13
- Cowboys – Mike Renfro 12 yard pass from Danny White (Rafael Septién kick) – NOS 27, Dal 20
- Cowboys – Jim Jeffcoat 0 yard fumble return (Rafael Septién kick) – NOS 27, Dal 27

Over Time

- Cowboys – Rafael Septién 41 yard field goal – NOS 27, Dal 30

Vegas Spread

- Vegas Line= Dal -6.0
- Over/Under= 42.0(over)

Dallas vs New Orleans – 1984

The 1984 season will not go down in Cowboys history as one they want to remember. Actually it's one of those seasons that should be forgotten. The Cowboys finished 9-7 and missed the playoffs. It was also the season that coach Tom Landry made the preseason decision to make Gary Hogeboom the starting quarterback over veteran Danny White.

The Cowboys went into the game against the Saints with a 4-3 record. They started strong with their first drive of the game as Hogeboom drove them to the Saints 20 yard line before the drive stalled on a Hogeboom sack by Saints linebacker Rickey Jackson. Rafael Septién kicked a field goal and the Cowboys took a short lived 3-0 lead.

Early in the second quarter the Saints punted and pinned the Cowboys on their own one yard line. The Cowboys were forced to punt after three plays and no yards gained. Danny White could only manage a 36 yard punt and the Saints took over on the Cowboys 39 yard line. Two plays later the Saints took the lead on a Richard Todd (Yes, the same Richard Todd who played for the Jets in the late 70s and early 80′s) to Tyrone Young 36 yard touchdown pass as Young streaked across the middle beating Everson Walls and Ron Fellows. The Saints went ahead 7-3.

The Cowboys could only manage another Septién field goal before the Saints went back to work. The Saints alternated running backs in 1984. Their first back was Earl Campbell (67 yds rushing in the game) and they also had George Rodgers (52 yds rushing in the game). But it was fullback Hokie Gajan who took center stage in this game as he ran for 78 yards and a touchdown. His score came after Ed Jones got a hold of him in the backfield, but Gajan managed to break free and went untouched from that point and scored from 62 yards out. This gave the Saints a 14-6 lead with 2:54 left before halftime.

Saints kicker Morten Anderson added a field goal at the end of the first half increasing the Saints lead to 17-6. Things would only get worse for the Cowboys in the third quarter.

Morten Anderson kicked his second field goal of the game early in the third quarter. With the Saints leading 20-6 things went from bad to worse for the Cowboys as Hogeboom was intercepted by Dirt Winston who then returned it 43 yards for a Saints touchdown. The Saints now led 27-6.

On the interception Hogeboom hit his wrist on a Saints helmet and forced him to the bench for the rest of the game. With the injury, it forced Danny White into the game. The entrance of White seemed to wake the Cowboys up.

Early in the fourth quarter Cowboys special teams player Chuck McSwain blocked a Saints punt and the Cowboys recovered on the Saints three yard line. From there Tony Dorsett ran it in and got the Cowboys closer at 27-13.

Late in the fourth quarter with only 3:59 to play Danny White threw a 12 yard touchdown pass to receiver Mike Renfro. This closed the Saints lead to 27-20.

With 2:53 left in the game and veteran Kenny Stabler in at quarterback for the Saints because of Richard Todd's injury early in the fourth quarter, the Dallas defense made a stand. Stabler attempted to pass from his own nine yard line as Randy White came crashing through the line and sacked Stabler forcing a fumble. The ball rolled into the end zone where Jim Jeffcoat fought through a wild scramble of players and recovered the fumble for the touchdown. With the extra point the Cowboys tied the game at 27-27.

The Cowboys actually got the ball back two more times in the final 1:20 of the game on two Stabler interceptions, but could not move the ball into scoring position. The game would go into overtime.

The Cowboys won the coin toss in overtime. From their own 29 yard line Danny White attempted a pass to Tony Hill who was interfered with, which resulted in a 24 yard penalty. Then White completed a 15 yard pass to Renfro to set up Septién for the winning field. Septein kicked a 41 yard field goal to complete the comeback and the Cowboys won the game 30-27. The comeback was the Cowboys biggest in team history.

"I always feel we can come back and win it", coach Tom Landry said. "Our guys found out how hard you have to work to win a football game."

"I feel good about our team now, said Landry. Better than I felt all year. We just haven’t played with the tough emotion we played with in the fourth quarter. It may be the difference the rest of the season. I’ve been saying all along we have to play hard to win."

"I thought all along I should start. But I don’t think because of the way Gary played I should start", White said. "I’d love to start to be back in there, where I should have been all along. But that's up to coach Landry. It meant a lot for my confidence."

=== Week 9 ===
Week Nine: Indianapolis Colts at Dallas Cowboys – Game summary

Quarter	1	2	3	4	Total
Colts (3-6)	0	0	0	3	3
Cowboys (6-3)	0	13	3	6	22

at Texas Stadium

- Date: Sunday, October 28, 1984
- Game time: 1:00pm(ET)
- Game weather: 67 degrees, relative humidity 71%, wind 10 mph
- Game attendance: 58,724
- Referee: Jim Tunney
- TV announcers (NBC): Don Criqui (play-by-play) and Bob Trumpy (color commentator)
- Pro-Football-Reference.com

=== Week 10 ===
Week Ten: New York Giants at Dallas Cowboys – Game summary

Quarter	1	2	3	4	Total
Giants (6-4)	6	0	7	6	19
Cowboys (6-4)	0	7	0	0	7

at Texas Stadium

- Date: Sunday, November 4, 1984
- Game time: 1:00pm(ET)
- Game weather: 61 degrees, relative humidity 78%, wind 15 mph
- Game attendance: 60,235
- Referee: Gene Barth
- TV announcers (CBS): Pat Summerall (play-by-play) and John Madden (color commentator)
- Pro-Football-Reference.com

=== Week 11 ===
Week Eleven: Dallas Cowboys at St. Louis Cardinals – Game summary

Quarter	1	2	3	4	Total
Cowboys (7-4)	7	10	0	7	24
Cardinals (6-5)	0	7	10	0	17

at Busch Stadium

- Date: Sunday, November 11, 1984
- Game time: 4:00pm(ET)
- Game weather: 36 degrees, relative humidity 84%, wind 19 mph, wind chill 26
- Game attendance: 48,721
- Referee: Gordon McCarter
- TV announcers (CBS): Pat Summerall (play-by-play) and John Madden (color commentator)
- Pro-Football-Reference.com

=== Week 12 ===
In their first visit to Rich Stadium and first overall to Buffalo since 1971, the Cowboys lost for the first time in four meetings with the Bills. The teams did not meet again until Super Bowl XXVII.

Week Twelve: Dallas Cowboys at Buffalo Bills – Game summary

Quarter	1	2	3	4	Total
Cowboys (7-5)	0	3	0	0	3
Bills (1-11)	7	0	0	7	14

at Rich Stadium

- Date: Sunday, November 18, 1984
- Game time: 1:00pm(ET)
- Game weather: 38 degrees, relative humidity 70%, wind 17 mph, wind chill 29
- Game attendance: 74,391
- Referee: Bob McElwee
- TV announcers (CBS): Dick Stockton (play-by-play) and Hank Stram (color commentator)
- Pro-Football-Reference.com

=== Week 13 ===
Week Thirteen: New England Patriots at Dallas Cowboys – Game summary

Quarter	1	2	3	4	Total
Patriots (8-5)	3	0	0	14	17
Cowboys (8-5)	7	3	7	3	20

at Texas Stadium

- Date: Thursday, November 22, 1984
- Game time: 4:00pm(ET)
- Game weather: 41 degrees, relative humidity 68%, wind 5 mph
- Game attendance: 55,341
- Referee: Dick Jorgensen
- TV announcers (NBC): Dick Enberg (play-by-play) and Merlin Olsen (color commentator)
- Pro-Football-Reference.com

=== Week 14 ===
Week Fourteen: Dallas Cowboys at Philadelphia Eagles – Game summary

Quarter	1	2	3	4	Total
Cowboys (9-5)	7	0	16	3	26
Eagles (5-8-1)	0	3	0	7	10

at Veterans Stadium

- Date: Sunday, December 2, 1984
- Game time: 1:00pm(ET)
- Game weather: 40 degrees, relative humidity 61%, wind 7 mph
- Game attendance: 66,322
- Referee: Bob Frederic
- TV announcers (CBS): Dick Stockton (play-by-play) and Hank Stram (color commentator)
- Pro-Football-Reference.com

=== Week 15 ===
Week Fifteen: Washington Redskins at Dallas Cowboys – Game summary

Quarter	1	2	3	4	Total
Redskins (10-5)	0	6	17	7	30
Cowboys (9-6)	7	14	0	7	28

at Texas Stadium

- Date: Sunday, December 9, 1984
- Game time: 4:00pm(ET)
- Game weather: 58 degrees, relative humidity 67%, wind 13 mph
- Game attendance: 64,286
- Referee: Tom Dooley
- TV announcers (CBS): Pat Summerall (play-by-play) and John Madden (color commentator)
- Pro-Football-Reference.com

=== Week 16 ===
Week Sixteen: Dallas Cowboys at Miami Dolphins – Game summary

Quarter	1	2	3	4	Total
Cowboys (9-7)	0	0	7	14	21
Miami (14-2)	0	7	7	14	28

at Orange Bowl

- Date: Monday, December 17, 1984
- Game time: 9:00pm(ET)
- Game weather: 73 degrees, relative humidity 68%, wind 16 mph
- Game attendance: 74,139
- Referee: Pat Haggerty
- TV announcers (ABC): Frank Gifford (play-by-play), Don Meredith and O. J. Simpson (color commentators)
- Pro-Football-Reference.com

Game information

First quarter

- No Score

Second quarter

- Dolphins – Mark Clayton 41 yard pass from Dan Marino (Uwe von Schamann kick) – Dal 0, Mia 7

Third quarter

- Dolphins – Bruce Hardy 3 yard pass from Dan Marino (Uwe von Schamann kick) – Dal 0, Mia 14
- Cowboys – Timmy Newsome 1 yard rush (Rafael Septién kick) – Dal 7, Mia 14

Fourth quarter

- Cowboys – Timmy Newsome 4 yard rush (Rafael Septién kick) – Dal 14, Mia 14
- Dolphins – Mark Clayton 39 yard pass from Dan Marino (Uwe von Schamann kick) – Dal 14, Mia 21
- Cowboys – Tony Hill 66 yard pass from Danny White (Rafael Septién kick) – Dal 21, Mia 21
- Dolphins – Mark Clayton 63 yard pass from Dan Marino (Uwe von Schamann kick) – Dal 21, Mia 28

Cowboys

- Passing

Danny White 20/34, 246 Yds, 1 TD, 2 Int, 66 Lng

- Rushing
- Tony Dorsett 19/58 Yds, O TD, 10 Lng
- Timmy Newsome 6/20 Yds, 2 TD, 7 Lng
- Receiving
- Tony Hill 6 Rec, 115 Yds, 1 TD, 66 Lng
- Doug Cosbie 5 Rec, 83 Yds, O TD, 25 Lng
- Tony Dorsett 6 Rec, 28 Yds, O TD, 14 Lng

Dolphins

- Passing
- Dan Marino 23/40, 340 Yds, 4 TD, 2 Int, 63 Lng
- Rushing
- Tony Nathan 13/39 Yds, O TD, 15 Lng
- Woody Bennett 7/14 Yds, O TD, 6 Lng
- Receiving
- Mark Clayton 4 Rec, 150 Yds, 3 TD, 63 Lng
- Mark Duper 4 Rec, 57 Yds, O TD, 25 Lng
- Nat Moore 3 Rec, 47 Yds, O TD, 22 Lng
- Tony Nathan 7 Rec, 46 Yds, O TD, 15 Lng
- Tony Nathan 7 Rec, 46 Yds, O TD, 15 Lng
- Bruce Hardy 3 Rec, 25 Yds, 1 TD, 14 Lng

Vegas Spread

- Vegas Line= Miami -6.5
- Over/Under= 47.0(over)

== Standings ==
NFC East
	W	L	T	PCT	DIV	CONF	PF	PA	STK
Washington Redskins^{(2)}	11	5	0	.688	5–3	8–4	426	310	W4
New York Giants^{(5)}	9	7	0	.563	5–3	7–7	299	301	L2
St. Louis Cardinals	9	7	0	.563	5–3	6–6	423	345	L1
Dallas Cowboys	9	7	0	.563	3–5	7–5	308	308	L2
Philadelphia Eagles	6	9	1	.406	2–6	3–8–1	278	320	L1

== Season recap ==
The Cowboys announced that they would celebrate their 25th anniversary during the 1984 season under the theme "Silver Season".

The sale of the franchise from the Murchison family to an 11-member limited partnership headed by Dallas businessman Harvey Roberts ("Bum") Bright was approved by NFL owners on March 19 and the sale was completed on May 18.

Gary Hogeboom replaced Danny White as the starting quarterback in the preseason, and a quarterback controversy ensued throughout the season. After a 4–1 start, Hogeboom played poorly in losses to St. Louis and Washington, and was replaced by White in both games. The following week against New Orleans, White had to relieve Hogeboom again, this time after Hogeboom injured his right wrist early in the second half. White led the Cowboys to victory, overcoming a 21-point deficit in the fourth quarter.

White started the next two games, but after a poor performance by both quarterbacks against the Giants, Hogeboom regained the starting position. The constant change at quarterback didn't help the team's inconsistent play, and they reached their lowest point at Buffalo late in the season, suffering a humiliating 14–3 loss at the hands of the winless Bills. Afterwards, White would go on to start at quarterback for the rest of the season. Still, despite all the turmoil surrounding the Cowboys, they held a 9–5 record going into the season's final two weeks and were tied for the division lead. However, two heartbreaking losses to the Redskins (a game in which the Cowboys led 21–6 at halftime) and Dolphins ended the Cowboys' string of postseason appearances at nine.

The Cowboys perennially potent offense fell into disarray during the 1984 season. The offensive line was ravaged by injury and retirement, and Cowboy quarterbacks were under duress all season. The line also struggled to open holes for the running game, despite another productive season from running back Tony Dorsett, who rushed for 1,189 yards. Turnovers were another source of frustration, as the offense turned it over 42 times. The defense once again featured a strong pass rush, led by perennial all-pro defensive tackle Randy White, as well as an opportunistic secondary, with safety Michael Downs leading the way with seven interceptions. However, stopping the run was a problem throughout the season, as the defense allowed 4.4 yards per carry.

== Awards ==
The Cowboys had three players represent them in the Pro Bowl: Randy White, Doug Cosbie, and Bill Bates, who became the first player to be chosen for the Pro Bowl for outstanding play on special teams coverage units. White was named to the associated press' All-NFL first team for his play at defensive tackle, while safety Michael Downs was named second team All-NFL, despite being overlooked for the pro bowl.

== Publications ==
- The Football Encyclopedia ISBN 0-312-11435-4
- Total Football ISBN 0-06-270170-3
- Cowboys Have Always Been My Heroes ISBN 0-446-51950-2
