= 1984 Miami Dolphins season =

19th season in franchise history; third Super Bowl loss

- Owner: Joe Robbie
- President: Joe Robbie
- Head coach: Don Shula
- Defensive coordinator: Chuck Studley
- Home stadium: Miami Orange Bowl

Results
- Record: 14–2
- Division place: 1st AFC East
- Playoffs: Won Divisional Playoffs (vs. Seahawks) 31–10; Won AFC Championship (vs. Steelers) 45–28; Lost Super Bowl XIX (vs. 49ers) 16–38
- Pro Bowlers: 8 QB Dan Marino; WR Mark Duper; WR Mark Clayton; G Ed Newman; C Dwight Stephenson; DT Bob Baumhower; ILB A.J. Duhe; P Reggie Roby

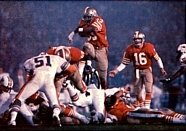
The Dolphins playing against the 49ers in Super Bowl XIX.

The 1984 Miami Dolphins season was the team's 19th season, and 15th in the National Football League (NFL). It was also the 15th season with the team for head coach Don Shula. The Dolphins sought to build on a spectacular 1983 season where they went 12–4 with rookie quarterback Dan Marino.

The Dolphins won the 1984 AFC Championship, and appeared in Super Bowl XIX, where they lost to the San Francisco 49ers, 38–16. To date this is the last season the Dolphins appeared in the Super Bowl. (Note: As of the 2022 season)

Second year quarterback Dan Marino's passing ability became the focal point of Miami's offense and in 1984 he exploded to set league records with 5,084 passing yards and 48 touchdowns. Marino's touchdown record was broken by Peyton Manning twenty years later and the yardage record was broken by Drew Brees twenty-seven years later. The Dolphins attempted early on to make a run at a perfect season twelve years after pulling off the feat, as they won their first eleven games but were upended in overtime by the San Diego Chargers. The Dolphins scored more than 500 points for the first and to date only time in their history, (Note: as of 2015 season) as they scored 513 points and finished 14–2, their best record since the undefeated season.

The year began on a somber note, as running back David Overstreet was killed in a traffic collision in June. The Dolphins wore helmet decals with the number 20 (his jersey number) in his memory during this season. Overstreet was the third Dolphin in four seasons to die just before the start of training camp, following Rusty Chambers in July 1981 and Larry Gordon in June 1983.

NFL Films produced a documentary about the team's season entitled Movers, Shakers and Record Breakers; it was narrated by Brad Crandall, the first time since 1969 the Dolphins' season highlights were not narrated by John Facenda, who died in September 1984 at age 72.

After the season, the last remaining Dolphin from their Super Bowl VIII team, longtime offensive lineman Ed Newman, retired, ending a 12-year era for the team. He holds the unique distinction as being the only man to make it to Super Bowl VIII and Super Bowl XIX as a member of the Dolphins, as well as Super Bowl XVII in between.

== Offseason ==
=== Draft ===
1984 Miami Dolphins draft
Round	Pick	Player	Position	College	Notes
1	14	Jackie Shipp	Linebacker	Oklahoma	
2	53	Jay Brophy	Linebacker	Miami (FL)	
4	109	Joe Carter	Running back	Alabama	
5	138	Dean May	Quarterback	Louisville	
6	165	Rowland Tatum	Linebacker	Ohio State	
7	194	Bernard Carvalho	Guard	Hawaii	
8	221	Ronnie Landry	Running back	McNeese State	
9	250	Jim Boyle	Tackle	Tulane	
10	277	John Chesley	Tight end	Oklahoma State	
11	305	Bud Brown	Safety	Southern Miss	
12	320	William Devane	Defensive tackle	Clemson	
12	333	Mike Weingrad	Linebacker	Illinois	
Made roster † Pro Football Hall of Fame * Made at least one Pro Bowl during career

=== Undrafted free agents ===
1984 undrafted free agents of note
Player	Position	College
Al Del Greco	Kicker	Auburn

== Week 1 roster ==
Quarterbacks (QB): 13 Dan Marino; 10 Don Strock; Running backs (RB): 34 Woody Bennett FB; 23 Joe Carter; 37 Andra Franklin FB; 31 Eddie Hill; 46 Pete Johnson FB; 22 Tony Nathan; Wide receivers (WR): 82 Fernanza Burgess; 81 Jimmy Cefalo; 83 Mark Clayton; 85 Mark Duper; 88 Vince Heflin; 11 Jim Jensen; 89 Nat Moore; Tight ends (TE): 84 Bruce Hardy; 87 Dan Johnson; 80 Joe Rose	Offensive linemen (OL): 61 Roy Foster G; 79 Jon Giesler T; 74 Cleveland Green T; 68 Eric Laakso T; 72 Ronnie Lee G; 64 Ed Newman G; 57 Dwight Stephenson C; 60 Jeff Toews C; Defensive linemen (DL): 70 Bill Barnett DE; 73 Bob Baumhower DT; 78 Charles Benson DE; 75 Doug Betters DE; 58 Kim Bokamper DE; 71 Mike Charles DE	Linebackers (LB): 56 Charles Bowser OLB; 53 Jay Brophy MLB; 51 Mark Brown MLB; 59 Bob Brudzinski OLB; 55 Earnest Rhone OLB; 50 Jackie Shipp MLB; 52 Sanders Shiver OLB; 54 Rodell Thomas LB; Defensive backs (DB): 47 Glenn Blackwood SS; 42 Lyle Blackwood FS; 43 Bud Brown SS; 49 William Judson CB; 40 Mike Kozlowski FS; 44 Paul Lankford CB; 28 Don McNeal CB; 45 Robert Sowell CB; Special teams (ST): 4 Reggie Roby P; 5 Uwe von Schamann K	Reserve: 77 A. J. Duhe MLB (IR); 52 Ron Hester LB (IR); 67 Bob Kuechenberg G (IR); 32 Tommy Vigorito HB (IR); 41 Fulton Walker CB (IR) 49 active, 0 practice squad, 6 reserve Rookies in italics

== Regular season ==
=== Schedule ===
Week	Date	Opponent	Result	Record	Venue	Attendance
1	September 2	at Washington Redskins	**W** 35–17	1–0	RFK Stadium	52,683
2	September 9	**New England Patriots**	**W** 28–7	2–0	Miami Orange Bowl	66,083
3	September 17	at **Buffalo Bills**	**W** 21–17	3–0	Rich Stadium	65,455
4	September 23	**Indianapolis Colts**	**W** 44–7	4–0	Miami Orange Bowl	55,415
5	September 30	at St. Louis Cardinals	**W** 36–28	5–0	Busch Memorial Stadium	46,991
6	October 7	at Pittsburgh Steelers	**W** 31–7	6–0	Three Rivers Stadium	59,103
7	October 14	Houston Oilers	**W** 28–10	7–0	Miami Orange Bowl	54,080
8	October 21	at **New England Patriots**	**W** 44–24	8–0	Sullivan Stadium	60,711
9	October 28	**Buffalo Bills**	**W** 38–7	9–0	Miami Orange Bowl	58,824
10	November 4	at **New York Jets**	**W** 31–17	10–0	Giants Stadium	72,655
11	November 11	Philadelphia Eagles	**W** 24–23	11–0	Miami Orange Bowl	70,227
12	November 18	at San Diego Chargers	**L** 28–34 (OT)	11–1	Jack Murphy Stadium	53,041
13	November 26	**New York Jets**	**W** 28–17	12–1	Miami Orange Bowl	74,884
14	December 2	Los Angeles Raiders	**L** 34–45	12–2	Miami Orange Bowl	71,222
15	December 9	at **Indianapolis Colts**	**W** 35–17	13–2	Hoosier Dome	60,411
16	December 17	Dallas Cowboys	**W** 28–21	14–2	Miami Orange Bowl	74,139
Note: Intra-division opponents are in **bold** text.

=== Season summary ===
==== Week 1 (Sunday, September 2, 1984): at Washington Redskins ====
Week 1: Miami Dolphins at Washington Redskins

Quarter	1	2	3	4	Total
Dolphins (1–0)	7	7	21	0	**35**
Redskins (0–1)	0	10	0	7	**17**

at RFK Stadium • Washington, D.C.

- Date: September 2, 1984
- Game time: 1:00 p.m. EDT
- Game weather: 76 °F (24 °C); relative humidity 62%; wind 10 miles per hour (16 km/h; 8.7 kn)
- Game attendance: 52,683
- Referee: Bob McElwee
- TV announcers (NBC): Charlie Jones (play-by-play) and Bob Griese (color commentator)

Team	Category	Player	Statistics
MIA	Passing	Dan Marino	21/28, 311 YDS, 5 TDs
MIA	Rushing	Andra Franklin	13 CAR, 48 YDS
MIA	Receiving	Mark Duper	6 REC, 178 YDS, 2 TDs
WSH	Passing	Joe Theismann	21/36, 204 YDS, 2 INTs
WSH	Rushing	John Riggins	15 CAR, 98 YDS, 1 TD
WSH	Receiving	Charlie Brown	6 REC, 60 YDS

Scoring summary

Quarter	Time	Drive			Team	Scoring information	Score	
Quarter	Time	Plays	Yards	TOP	Team	Scoring information	MIA	WSH
1	1:44	6	69	3:20	Dolphins	Duper 26-yard touchdown reception from Marino, von Schamann kick good	7	0
2	11:12	10	80	5:32	Redskins	Riggins 1-yard touchdown run, Moseley kick good	7	7
2	3:13	11	71	5:44	Redskins	32-yard field goal by Moseley	7	10
2	2:06	3	82	1:07	Dolphins	Duper 74-yard touchdown reception from Marino, von Schamann kick good	14	10
3	11:13	7	68	3:47	Dolphins	Jensen 6-yard touchdown reception from Marino, von Schamann kick good	21	10
3	5:52	6	43	3:48	Dolphins	Clayton 9-yard touchdown reception from Marino, von Schamann kick good	28	10
3	3:10	3	7	1:25	Dolphins	Jensen 4-yard touchdown reception from Marino, von Schamann kick good	35	10
4	7:16	6	49	2:57	Redskins	Washington 4-yard touchdown run, Moseley kick good	35	17
"TOP" = time of possession. For other American football terms, see Glossary of American football.							35	17

- Point spread: Redskins by 4½
- Over/under: 46.0 **(over)**
- Time of game: 2 hours, 45 minutes

Dolphins	Game statistics	Redskins
18	First downs	23
30–86	Rushes–yards	29–156
311	Passing yards	204
21–28–0	Passes	21–36–2
0–0	Sacked–yards	2–11
311	Net passing yards	193
397	Total yards	349
152	Return yards	148
5–45.8	Punts	4–43.8
0–0	Fumbles–lost	1–1
4–45	Penalties–yards	3–20
28:48	Time of Possession	31:12

Dan Marino had one of the best passing days of his career, completing 21 of 28 passes for 311 yards with 5 TDs and no interceptions for a Passer Rating of 150.4. This game also marked the emergence of Jim "Crash" Jensen, who lined up as a receiver for the first time and caught 2 of Marino's TD passes. Until 2015, this was the Dolphins' last road win over the Redskins.

==== Week 2 (Sunday, September 9, 1984): vs. New England Patriots ====
Week 2: New England Patriots at Miami Dolphins

Quarter	1	2	3	4	Total
Patriots (1–1)	0	7	0	0	**7**
Dolphins (2–0)	0	7	14	7	**28**

at Miami Orange Bowl • Miami, Florida

- Date: September 9, 1984
- Game time: 1:02 p.m. EDT
- Game weather: 79 °F (26 °C); relative humidity 65%; wind 10 miles per hour (16 km/h; 8.7 kn)
- Game attendance: 66,083
- Referee: Chuck Heberling
- TV announcers (NBC): Jay Randolph (play-by-play) and Bob Griese (color commentator)

Team	Category	Player	Statistics
NE	Passing	Steve Grogan	20/42, 217 YDS, 1 TD, 4 INTs
NE	Rushing	Tony Collins	20 CAR, 87 YDS
NE	Receiving	Derrick Ramsey	5 REC, 70 YDS
MIA	Passing	Dan Marino	17/28, 269 YDS, 3 TDs, 2 INTs
MIA	Rushing	Tony Nathan	10 CAR, 36 YDS
MIA	Receiving	Mark Clayton	5 REC, 75 YDS, 2 TDs

Scoring summary

Quarter	Time	Drive			Team	Scoring information	Score	
Quarter	Time	Plays	Yards	TOP	Team	Scoring information	NE	MIA
2	5:37	2	55	0:16	Dolphins	Duper 35-yard touchdown reception from Jensen, von Schamann kick good	0	7
2	0:56	10	90	4:31	Patriots	Dawson 5-yard touchdown reception from Grogan, Franklin kick good	7	7
3	12:38	4	73	2:22	Dolphins	Clayton 35-yard touchdown reception from Marino, von Schamann kick good	7	14
3	11:02	2	16	0:43	Dolphins	Clayton 15-yard touchdown reception from Marino, von Schamann kick good	7	21
4	2:53	—	—	—	Dolphins	Interception returned 60 yards for touchdown by Judson, von Schamann kick good	7	28
"TOP" = time of possession. For other American football terms, see Glossary of American football.							7	28

- Point spread: Dolphins by 6
- Over/under: 43.0 **(under)**
- Time of game: 3 hours, 3 minutes

Patriots	Game statistics	Dolphins
18	First downs	17
28–127	Rushes–yards	30–74
217	Passing yards	269
20–42–4	Passes	17–28–2
2–12	Sacked–yards	0–0
205	Net passing yards	269
332	Total yards	343
74	Return yards	183
8–39.6	Punts	5–41.6
2–1	Fumbles–lost	0–0
6–53	Penalties–yards	6–46
30:46	Time of Possession	29:14

Dan Marino increased his two-game total of seven touchdown passes as he tossed a pair of scoring strikes to Mark Clayton within a 1:36 span in the third quarter to lead Miami to its 17th straight victory against the Patriots at The Orange Bowl. Miami intercepted four Steve Grogan passes. Mike Kozlowski returned one 26 yards, then laterred to William Judson who rambled the remaining 60 yards for a touchdown.

==== Week 3 (Monday, September 17, 1984): at Buffalo Bills ====
Week 3: Miami Dolphins at Buffalo Bills

Quarter	1	2	3	4	Total
Dolphins (3–0)	7	7	7	0	**21**
Bills (0–3)	0	3	7	7	**17**

at Rich Stadium • Orchard Park, New York

- Date: September 17, 1984
- Game time: 9:01 p.m. EDT
- Game weather: 54 °F (12 °C); wind 8 miles per hour (13 km/h; 7.0 kn)
- Game attendance: 65,455
- Referee: Bob Frederic
- TV announcers (ABC): Frank Gifford (play-by-play) and O. J. Simpson (color commentator)

Scoring summary

Quarter	Time	Drive			Team	Scoring information	Score	
Quarter	Time	Plays	Yards	TOP	Team	Scoring information	MIA	BUF
1	2:09	8	62	5:13	Dolphins	Duper 11-yard touchdown reception from Marino, von Schamann kick good	7	0
2	5:04	9	52	4:20	Dolphins	Clayton 12-yard touchdown reception from Marino, von Schamann kick good	14	0
2	0:05	5	18	1:11	Bills	33-yard field goal by Danelo	14	3
3	11:27	9	57	3:21	Dolphins	Moore 1-yard touchdown reception from Marino, von Schamann kick good	21	3
3	3:57	15	80	6:30	Bills	Williams 1-yard touchdown run, Danelo kick good	21	10
4	9:20	9	79	3:43	Bills	Dawkins 13-yard touchdown reception from Ferguson, Danelo kick good	21	17
"TOP" = time of possession. For other American football terms, see Glossary of American football.							21	17

- Time of game: 3 hours, 15 minutes

==== Week 4 ====
Team	1	2	3	4	Total
Colts	0	7	0	0	7
• Dolphins	7	16	14	7	44

- Date: September 23
- Location: Orange Bowl
- Referee: Red Cashion
- TV announcers (NBC): Charlie Jones, Bob Griese

==== Week 5 ====
Team	1	2	3	4	Total
• Dolphins	6	20	0	10	36
Cardinals	0	14	7	7	28

- Date: September 30
- Location: Busch Stadium
- Referee: Pat Haggerty
- TV announcers (NBC): Jay Randolph, Bob Griese

==== Week 6 ====
Team	1	2	3	4	Total
• Dolphins	0	21	3	7	31
Steelers	0	0	7	0	7

- Date: October 7
- Location: Three Rivers Stadium
- Referee: Jerry Markbreit
- TV announcers (NBC): Jay Randolph, Bob Griese

==== Week 7 ====
Team	1	2	3	4	Total
Oilers	0	0	3	7	10
• Dolphins	0	7	7	14	28

- Date: October 14
- Location: Orange Bowl
- Referee: Dick Jorgensen
- TV announcers (NBC): Gary Gerould, Dave Rowe

==== Week 8 (Sunday, October 21, 1984): at New England Patriots ====
Week 8: Miami Dolphins at New England Patriots

Quarter	1	2	3	4	Total
Dolphins (8–0)	3	13	14	14	**44**
Patriots (5–3)	3	7	7	7	**24**

at Sullivan Stadium • Foxborough, Massachusetts

- Date: October 21, 1984
- Game time: 1:00 p.m. EDT
- Game weather: 58 °F (14 °C); relative humidity 53%; wind 10 miles per hour (16 km/h; 8.7 kn)
- Game attendance: 60,711
- Referee: Jim Tunney
- TV announcers (NBC): Charlie Jones (play-by-play) and Bob Griese (color commentator)

Team	Category	Player	Statistics
MIA	Passing	Dan Marino	24/39, 316 YDS, 4 TDs, 1 INT
MIA	Rushing	Joe Carter	14 CAR, 92 YDS
MIA	Receiving	Mark Clayton	7 REC, 99 YDS, 1 TD
NE	Passing	Tony Eason	19/29, 313 YDS, 3 TDs
NE	Rushing	Mosi Tatupu	20 CAR, 90 YDS
NE	Receiving	Derrick Ramsey	5 REC, 32 YDS, 1 TD

Scoring summary

Quarter	Time	Drive			Team	Scoring information	Score	
Quarter	Time	Plays	Yards	TOP	Team	Scoring information	MIA	NE
1	8:33	13	74	3:55	Dolphins	28-yard field goal by von Schamann	3	0
1	2:33	12	49	5:54	Patriots	48-yard field goal by Franklin	3	3
2	14:32	7	65	2:51	Dolphins	Johnson 1-yard touchdown run, von Schamann kick good	10	3
2	1:55	8	66	4:03	Patriots	Weathers 14-yard touchdown reception from Eason, Franklin kick good	10	10
2	0:06	11	80	1:49	Dolphins	Moore 19-yard touchdown reception from Marino, von Schamann kick no good	16	10
3	6:40	13	80	8:20	Dolphins	Johnson 5-yard touchdown reception from Marino, von Schamann kick good	23	10
3	6:22	1	76	0:18	Patriots	Morgan 76-yard touchdown reception from Eason, Franklin kick good	23	17
3	2:31	7	75	2:51	Dolphins	Clayton 15-yard touchdown reception from Marino, von Schamann kick good	30	17
4	11:27	12	61	7:04	Patriots	Ramsey 5-yard touchdown reception from Eason, Franklin kick good	30	24
4	8:24	6	66	3:04	Dolphins	Moore 15-yard touchdown reception from Marino, von Schamann kick good	37	24
4	1:11	10	69	4:39	Dolphins	Johnson 3-yard touchdown run, von Schamann kick good	44	24
"TOP" = time of possession. For other American football terms, see Glossary of American football.							44	24

- Point spread: Dolphins by 4
- Over/under: 42.0 **(over)**
- Time of game: 3 hours, 13 minutes

Dolphins	Game statistics	Patriots
33	First downs	18
37–236	Rushes–yards	27–102
316	Passing yards	313
24–39–1	Passes	19–29–0
0–0	Sacked–yards	1–7
316	Net passing yards	306
552	Total yards	408
75	Return yards	113
1–38.0	Punts	3–57.0
0–0	Fumbles–lost	1–1
6–36	Penalties–yards	6–36
31:59	Time of Possession	28:01

==== Week 9 (Sunday, October 28, 1984): vs. Buffalo Bills ====
Week 9: Buffalo Bills at Miami Dolphins

Quarter	1	2	3	4	Total
Bills (0–9)	0	0	0	7	**7**
Dolphins (9–0)	7	17	0	14	**38**

at Miami Orange Bowl • Miami, Florida

- Date: October 28, 1984
- Game time: 4:01 p.m. EST
- Game attendance: 58,824
- Referee: Gene Barth
- TV announcers (NBC): Charlie Jones (play-by-play) and Bob Griese (color commentator)

Scoring summary

Quarter	Time	Drive			Team	Scoring information	Score	
Quarter	Time	Plays	Yards	TOP	Team	Scoring information	BUF	MIA
1	3:18	7	80	3:06	Dolphins	Clayton 7-yard touchdown reception from Marino, von Schamann kick good	0	7
2	14:53	3	47	1:20	Dolphins	Johnson 10-yard touchdown reception from Marino, von Schamann kick good	0	14
2	7:55	10	77	4:50	Dolphins	22-yard field goal by von Schamann	0	17
2	2:33	4	75	1:05	Dolphins	Clayton 65-yard touchdown reception from Marino, von Schamann kick good	0	24
4	14:19	7	64	3:42	Dolphins	Bennett 1-yard touchdown run, von Schamann kick good	0	31
4	3:26	12	68	7:44	Dolphins	Johnson 1-yard touchdown run, von Schamann kick good	0	38
4	1:22	10	75	2:04	Bills	Dennard 5-yard touchdown reception from Kofler, Danelo kick good	7	38
"TOP" = time of possession. For other American football terms, see Glossary of American football.							7	38

- Time of game: 2 hours, 54 minutes

==== Week 10 ====
Team	1	2	3	4	Total
• Dolphins	7	0	7	17	31
Jets	7	3	0	7	17

- Date: November 4
- Location: Giants Stadium
- Game start: 4:00 p.m. EST
- Game weather: 49 °F (9 °C); wind 13 mph (21 km/h)
- Referee: Gordon McCarter
- TV announcers (NBC): Charlie Jones and Bob Griese

Scoring summary
Q1	7:38	MIA	Moore 37 yard pass from Marino (von Schamann kick)	MIA 7–0
Q1	5:03	NYJ	Walker 33 yard pass from Ryan (Leahy kick)	Tie 7–7
Q2	2:14	NYJ	Leahy 32 yard field goal	NYJ 10–7
Q3	4:21	MIA	Bennett 3 yard run (von Schamann kick)	MIA 14–10
Q4	9:31	NYJ	McNeil 6 yard run (Leahy kick)	NYJ 17–14
Q4	7:45	MIA	Clayton 47 yard pass from Marino (von Schamann kick)	MIA 21—17
Q4	3:56	MIA	von Schamann 30 yard field goal	MIA 24–17
Q4	1:57	MIA	Johnson 2 yard run (von Schamann kick)	MIA 31–17

==== Week 11 ====
Team	1	2	3	4	Total
Eagles	14	0	3	6	23
• Dolphins	0	7	7	10	24

- Date: November 11
- Location: Orange Bowl
- Referee: Tom Dooley
- TV announcers (CBS): Frank Glieber and Jean Fugett

==== Week 12 ====
Team	1	2	3	4	OT	Total
Dolphins	0	21	7	0	0	28
• Chargers	7	7	0	14	6	34

- Date: November 18
- Location: Jack Murphy Stadium
- Referee: Red Cashion
- TV announcers (NBC): Dick Enberg, Merlin Olsen

==== Week 13 ====
Team	1	2	3	4	Total
Jets	7	3	7	0	17
• Dolphins	0	14	14	0	28

- Date: November 26
- Location: Orange Bowl
- Referee: Fred Wyant
- TV announcers (ABC): Frank Gifford, Don Meredith, O. J. Simpson

==== Week 14 ====
Team	1	2	3	4	Total
• Raiders	7	10	7	21	45
Dolphins	7	6	14	7	34

- Date: December 2
- Location: Orange Bowl
- Referee: Ben Dreith
- TV announcers (NBC): Dick Enberg, Merlin Olsen

==== Week 15 ====
Team	1	2	3	4	Total
• Dolphins	7	0	14	14	35
Colts	7	10	0	0	17

- Date: December 9
- Location: Hoosier Dome
- Game weather: Indoors (dome)
- Referee: Dick Jorgensen
- TV announcers (NBC): Jay Randolph, Reggie Rucker

==== Week 16 ====
Team	1	2	3	4	Total
Cowboys	0	0	7	14	21
• Dolphins	0	7	7	14	28

- Date: December 17
- Location: Orange Bowl
- Referee: Pat Haggerty
- TV announcers (ABC): Frank Gifford, O. J. Simpson, Don Meredith

=== Playoffs ===
Round	Date	Opponent (seed)	Result	Record	Venue	Attendance
Divisional	December 29	Seattle Seahawks (4)	**W** 31–10	1–0	Miami Orange Bowl	73,469
AFC Championship	January 6, 1985	Pittsburgh Steelers (3)	**W** 45–28	2–0	Miami Orange Bowl	76,029
Super Bowl XIX	January 20, 1985	San Francisco 49ers (N1)	**L** 16–38	2–1	Stanford Stadium	84,059

=== Standings ===
AFC East
	W	L	T	PCT	DIV	CONF	PF	PA	STK
^{(1)} Miami Dolphins	14	2	0	.875	8–0	10–2	513	298	W2
New England Patriots	9	7	0	.563	6–2	9–3	362	352	W1
New York Jets	7	9	0	.438	3–5	7–7	332	364	L1
Indianapolis Colts	4	12	0	.250	2–6	4–8	239	414	L5
Buffalo Bills	2	14	0	.125	1–7	1–11	250	454	L2

== Player stats ==
=== Passing ===
Player	Att	Comp	Yds	TD	INT	Rating
Dan Marino	564	362	5084	48	17	108.9

== Postseason ==
=== Divisional ===
Team	1	2	3	4	Total
Seahawks	0	10	0	0	10
• Dolphins	7	7	14	3	31

- Date: December 29
- Location: Orange Bowl
- TV announcers (NBC): Marv Albert, John Brodie

A year after being upended in the playoffs by the Seattle Seahawks the Dolphins routed Seattle 31–10. Dan Marino threw for 264 yards and three touchdowns despite being intercepted twice by Seahawks defensive back John Harris. The Dolphins rushed for 143 yards and a Tony Nathan rushing score as well.

=== Conference Championship ===
Team	1	2	3	4	Total
Steelers	7	7	7	7	28
• Dolphins	7	17	14	7	45

- Date: January 6
- Location: Orange Bowl
- Game start: 12:30 p.m. EST
- Game weather: Sunny; 64 °F (18 °C)
- Referee: Jerry Markbreit
- TV announcers (NBC): Dick Enberg and Merlin Olsen

Scoring summary
Q1	7:45	MIA	Clayton 40 yard pass from Marino (von Schamann kick)	MIA 7–0
Q1	3:30	PIT	Erenberg 7 yard run (Anderson kick)	Tie 7–7
Q2	9:04	MIA	von Schamann 26 yard field goal	MIA 10–7
Q2	3:52	PIT	Stallworth 65 yard pass from Malone (Anderson kick)	PIT 14–10
Q2	2:30	MIA	Duper 41 yard pass from Marino (von Schamann kick)	MIA 17–14
Q2	0:36	MIA	Nathan 2 yard run (von Schamann kick)	MIA 24–14
Q3	13:12	MIA	Duper 36 yard pass from Marino (von Schamann kick)	MIA 31–14
Q3	7:55	PIT	Stallworth 19 yard pass from Malone (Anderson kick)	MIA 31–21
Q3	1:40	MIA	Bennett 1 yard run (von Schamann kick)	MIA 38–21
Q4	11:05	MIA	Moore 6 yard pass from Marino (von Schamann kick)	MIA 45–21
Q4	0:25	PIT	Capers 29 yard pass from Malone (Anderson kick)	MIA 45–28

In a shootout, quarterback Dan Marino led the Dolphins to a victory by throwing for 421 yards and four touchdowns with one interception. Steelers quarterback Mark Malone recorded 312 yards and 3 touchdowns, but was intercepted three times. With their 3rd ever victory in the Conference Championship, the Dolphins were able to advance to Super Bowl XIX. As of 2025, this remains the Dolphins last win in the AFC Championship.

=== Super Bowl XIX (Sunday, January 20, 1985): vs. San Francisco 49ers ===
Super Bowl XIX: Miami Dolphins vs. San Francisco 49ers

Quarter	1	2	3	4	Total
Dolphins (16–3)	10	6	0	0	16
49ers (18–1)	7	21	10	0	38

at Stanford Stadium • Stanford, California

- Date: January 20, 1985
- Game time: 6:19 p.m. EST
- Game weather: 53 °F (12 °C), cloudy, fog for much of the second half
- Game attendance: 84,059
- Referee: Pat Haggerty
- TV announcers (ABC): Frank Gifford (play-by-play), Don Meredith (color commentator) and Joe Theismann (color commentator)

The Dolphins season ended with an overall record of 16-3. As of 2025, this remains the Dolphins last appearance in the Super Bowl.

Team	Category	Player	Statistics
MIA	Passing	Dan Marino	29/50, 318 YDS, 1 TD, 2 INTs
MIA	Rushing	Tony Nathan	5 CAR, 18 YDS
MIA	Receiving	Tony Nathan	10 REC, 83 YDS
SF	Passing	Joe Montana	24/35, 331 YDS, 3 TDs
SF	Rushing	Wendell Tyler	13 CAR, 65 YDS
SF	Receiving	Roger Craig	7 REC, 77 YDS, 2 TDs

Scoring summary

Quarter	Time	Drive			Team	Scoring information	Score	
Quarter	Time	Plays	Yards	TOP	Team	Scoring information	MIA	SF
1	7:24	7	45	3:50	Dolphins	37-yard field goal by von Schamann	3	0
1	3:12	8	78	4:12	49ers	Monroe 33-yard touchdown reception from Montana, Wersching kick good	3	7
1	0:45	6	70	2:27	Dolphins	Johnson 2-yard touchdown reception from Marino, von Schamann kick good	10	7
2	11:34	4	47	1:25	49ers	Craig 8-yard touchdown reception from Montana, Wersching kick good	10	14
2	6:58	6	55	2:43	49ers	Montana 6-yard touchdown run, Wersching kick good	10	21
2	2:05	9	52	3:39	49ers	Craig 2-yard touchdown run, Wersching kick good	10	28
2	0:12	12	72	1:53	Dolphins	31-yard field goal by von Schamann	13	28
2	0:00	1	0	0:04	Dolphins	30-yard field goal by von Schamann	16	28
3	10:12	10	43	3:28	49ers	27-yard field goal by Wersching	16	31
3	6:18	5	70	2:20	49ers	Craig 16-yard touchdown reception from Montana, Wersching kick good	16	38
"TOP" = time of possession. For other American football terms, see Glossary of American football.							16	38

- Point spread: 49ers by 3
- Over/under: 53.5 (over)
- Time of game: 3 hours, 13 minutes

Dolphins	Game statistics	49ers
19	First downs	31
9–25	Rushes–yards	40–211
318	Passing yards	331
29–50–2	Passes	24–35–0
4–29	Sacked–yards	1–5
289	Net passing yards	326
314	Total yards	537
155	Return yards	91
6–39.3	Punts	3–32.7
1–0	Fumbles–lost	2–2
1–10	Penalties–yards	2–10
22:49	Time of Possession	37:11

Super Bowl XIX was played on January 20, 1985, and featured the San Francisco 49ers and the Miami Dolphins. The 49ers won their second Super Bowl, defeating the Dolphins 38–16. Dan Marino, the Dolphins quarterback passed for one touchdown and two interceptions, while Joe Montana, the 49ers quarterback passed for 3 touchdowns and rushed for another.

== Awards and honors ==
- Dan Marino, 1984 NFL MVP
- Dan Marino, 1984 PFWA MVP
- Dan Marino, 1984 NEA MVP
- Dan Marino, 1984 NFL Offensive Player of the Year
- Dan Marino, 1984 UPI AFL-AFC Player of the Year
- Dan Marino, Bert Bell Award

== Personnel ==
=== Coaches / Staff ===
1984 Miami Dolphins staff
Front office: Owner / Team President – Joe Robbie; Executive vice president/general manager – Mike Robbie; Vice president – Don Shula; Director of player personnel – Chuck Connor; Director of pro scouting – Charley Winner; Head coaches: Head coach – Don Shula; Offensive coaches: Offensive backs – Carl Taseff; Receivers – David Shula; Offensive line – John Sandusky	Defensive coaches: Defense – Chuck Studley; Defensive line/run defense – Mike Scarry; Defensive backs – Tom Keane; Special teams coaches: Special teams – Bob Matheson; Punting – Tom Keane; Strength and conditioning: Strength and flexibility – Junior Wade

=== Final roster ===
1984 Miami Dolphins roster
Quarterbacks (QB): 13 Dan Marino; 10 Don Strock; Running backs (RB): 34 Woody Bennett; 20 Joe Carter; 31 Eddie Hill; 46 Pete Johnson; 22 Tony Nathan; Wide receivers (WR): 81 Jimmy Cefalo; 83 Mark Clayton; 85 Mark Duper; 88 Vince Heflin; 11 Jim Jensen; 89 Nat Moore; Tight ends (TE): 84 Bruce Hardy; 87 Dan Johnson; 80 Joe Rose	Offensive linemen (OL): 76 Steve Clark G; 61 Roy Foster G; 79 Jon Giesler T; 74 Cleveland Green T; 72 Ronnie Lee T; 64 Ed Newman G; 57 Dwight Stephenson C; 60 Jeff Toews C/G; Defensive linemen (DL): 70 Bill Barnett NT; 73 Bob Baumhower NT; 78 Charles Benson DE; 75 Doug Betters DE; 58 Kim Bokamper DE	Linebackers (LB): 56 Charles Bowser OLB; 53 Jay Brophy ILB; 51 Mark Brown ILB; 59 Bob Brudzinski OLB; 77 A. J. Duhe ILB; 91 Ed Judie OLB; 55 Earnie Rhone ILB; 50 Jackie Shipp ILB; 52 Sanders Shiver OLB; Defensive backs (DB): 47 Glenn Blackwood SS; 42 Lyle Blackwood FS; 43 Bud Brown SS; 49 William Judson CB; 40 Mike Kozlowski FS; 44 Paul Lankford CB; 28 Don McNeal CB; 45 Robert Sowell CB; 41 Fulton Walker CB; Special teams (ST): 4 Reggie Roby P; 5 Uwe von Schamann K	Reserve: 71 Mike Charles DE (IR); 37 Andra Franklin RB (IR); -- Ron Hester LB (IR); 67 Bob Kuechenberg G (IR); 68 Eric Laakso T (IR); 54 Rodell Thomas LB (IR); 32 Tommy Vigorito RB (IR); Rookies in italics 49 active, 7 reserve

== In popular culture ==
A fictionalized version of the 1984 Dolphins led by Marino is depicted in the 1994 film Ace Ventura: Pet Detective. Marino himself stars in the film alongside Jim Carrey’s protagonist character - private investigator Ace Ventura, and it revolves around Ventura investigating a kidnapping and murder revolving around a fictional ex-Dolphins kicker named Ray Finkle, who missed a game-winning field goal in the Super Bowl against the 49ers.
