= List of Miami Dolphins team records =

This article details records relating to the Miami Dolphins NFL American football team.

== Team records ==
- Regular-season record (all-time): 421–321–4
- Playoff record (all-time): 20–22 (last appearance after 2022 season)
- Super Bowls won: 2 out of 5 appearances
- Most games played: Dan Marino (1983–1999) – 242 games
- Most victories: Dan Marino (1983–1999) – 147 victories
- Winningest coach (all-time): Don Shula – 257 wins

== Passing (season) ==
- Most pass attempts: Dan Marino (1986) – 623 attempts
- Most pass completions: Ryan Tannehill (2014) – 392 completions
- Most passing yards: Dan Marino (1984) – 5,084 yards
- Most passing touchdowns: Dan Marino (1984) – 48 touchdowns
- Most pass interceptions: Dan Marino (1986) – 23 INT
- Longest pass: Bob Griese (1971) – 86 yards

== Passing (career) ==
- Most pass attempts: Dan Marino (1983–1999) – 8,358 attempts
- Most pass completions: Dan Marino (1983–1999) – 4,967 completions
- Most passing yards: Dan Marino (1983–1999) – 61,361 yards
- Most pass touchdowns: Dan Marino (1983–1999) – 420 touchdowns
- Moss pass interceptions: Dan Marino (1983–1999) – 252 interceptions
- Longest pass: Bob Griese (1967–1980) – 86 yards
- Most pass attempts in a rookie season: Ryan Tannehill (2012) – 504 attempts
- Most pass completions in a rookie season: Ryan Tannehill (2012) – 282 completions
- Most passing yards in a rookie season: Ryan Tannehill (2012) – 3,294 yards

== Rushing (season) ==
- Most rushing attempts: Ricky Williams (2003) – 392 attempts
- Most rushing yards: Ricky Williams (2002) – 1,853 yards
- Most rushing touchdowns: Raheem Mostert (2023) – 18 touchdowns
- Longest rush: Lamar Miller (2014) – 97 yards
- Longest rush by a quarterback: Ryan Tannehill (2013) – 48 yards

== Rushing (career) ==
- Most rush attempts: Ricky Williams (2002–2010) – 1,509 attempts
- Most rushing yards: Larry Csonka (1968–1974,1979) – 6,737 yards
- Most rushing touchdowns: Larry Csonka (1968–1974,1979) – 53 touchdowns
- Longest rush: Lamar Miller (2012–2014) – 97 yards

== Receiving (season) ==
- Most receptions: Tyreek Hill (2022, 2023) – 119 receptions
- Most receiving yards: Tyreek Hill (2023) – 1,799 yards
- Most receiving TDs: Mark Clayton (1984) – 18 TDs
- Longest reception: Paul Warfield (1971) – 86 yards
- Most receptions in a rookie season: Jaylen Waddle (2021) – 104 receptions

== Receiving (career) ==
- Most receptions: Mark Clayton (1983–1992) – 550 receptions
- Most receiving yards: Mark Duper (1983–1992) – 8,869 yards
- Most receiving TDs: Mark Clayton (1983–1992) – 81 TDs
- Longest reception: Paul Warfield (1971) – 86 yards

== Returns (career) ==
- Most punt return yards: Jake Scott (1970–1975) – 1,330 yards
- Most punt return TDs: Jakeem Grant (2016–2021) – 3 TDs
- Longest punt return: Jakeem Grant (2016–2021) – 88 yards
- Most kickoff yards: Wes Welker (2004–2006) – 3,756 yards
- Most kickoff TDs: Mercury Morris (1969–1973) – 3 touchdowns
- Longest kickoff return: Mercury Morris (1969–1973) – 105 yards

== Defense (career) ==
- Most tackles: Zach Thomas (1996–2007) – 1,035 tackles
- Most sacks: Jason Taylor (1997–2011) – 131.0 sacks
- Most forced fumbles: Jason Taylor (1997–2011) – 48 fumbles
- Most interceptions: Jake Scott (1970–1975) – 35 interceptions
