= 1984 Washington Redskins season =

NFL team season

- Owner: Jack Kent Cooke
- General manager: Bobby Beathard
- President: Edward Bennett Williams
- Head coach: Joe Gibbs
- Offensive coordinator: Joe Bugel
- Defensive coordinator: Richie Petitbon
- Home stadium: RFK Stadium

Results
- Record: 11–5
- Division place: 1st NFC East
- Playoffs: Lost Divisional Playoffs (vs. Bears) 19–23

The 1984 Washington Redskins season was the franchise's 53rd season in the National Football League. They failed to improve on their 14–2 record from 1983 and finished at 11–5. Art Monk set an NFL record (since broken) for most receptions in a season. The Redskins started the season losing their first two games but would recover to win their next five games. A mid-season slump had them on the playoff bubble at 7–5. However, the Redskins would finish the season in strong fashion winning their final four games to win the NFC East with an 11–5 record.

The Redskins quest for a third straight NFC Championship ended quickly as the Skins were stunned by the Chicago Bears 23–19 at RFK Stadium, Washington's only playoff loss at RFK. The 1984 Redskins have an NFL-record 14 straight games with 3 or more sacks, having accomplished that from weeks 3 to 16.

== Personnel ==
=== Coaches / Staff ===
1984 Washington Redskins staff
Front office: Majority Owner / Chairman Of The Board – Jack Kent Cooke; Minority Owner / Team President - Edward Bennett Williams; Executive Vice President - John Kent Cooke; General manager – Bobby Beathard; Senior Vice President - Gerard T. Gabrys; Director of Player Personnel - Mike Allman; Head coaches: Head coach – Joe Gibbs; Offensive coaches: Quarterbacks Coach - Jerry Rhome; Offensive Backfield / Running backs – Don Breaux; Tight Ends / Offensive Scouting Reports - Warren Simmons; Offensive line / Offensive Coordinator – Joe Bugel; Recivers Coach - Charley Taylor	Defensive coaches: Defensive Coordinator – Richie Petitbon; Defensive Line Coach - LaVern Torgeson; Head strength and conditioning – Dan Riley; Linebackers Coach / Assistant Defensive Coordinator – Larry Peccatiello; Defenisive Astsistant / Player Personnel Intern - Steve Spagnuolo; Special teams coaches: Special teams coordinator – Wayne Sevier

=== Final roster ===
1984 Washington Redskins roster
Quarterbacks (QB): 17 Jim Hart; 10 Jay Schroeder; 7 Joe Theismann; Running backs (RB): 35 Keith Griffin; 30 Jeff Moore; 44 John Riggins; 25 Joe Washington; 39 Otis Wonsley; Wide receivers (WR): 87 Charlie Brown; 83 Rich Mauti; 83 Mark McGrath; 81 Art Monk; 89 Calvin Muhammad; 21 Mike Nelms; Tight ends (TE): 86 Clint Didier; 82 Anthony Jones; 88 Rick Walker; 85 Don Warren	Offensive linemen (OL): 76 Rick Donnalley C; 68 Russ Grimm G; 61 Ken Huff G; 66 Joe Jacoby T; 67 Bruce Kimball G; 73 Mark May T/G; 74 George Starke T; Defensive linemen (DL): 67 Tom Beasley DE/DT; 69 Perry Brooks DT; 65 Dave Butz DT; 77 Darryl Grant DT; 72 Dexter Manley DE; 71 Charles Mann DE; 78 Tony McGee DE	Linebackers (LB): 51 Monte Coleman OLB; 54 Peter Cronan MLB; 56 Trey Junkin OLB; 55 Mel Kaufman OLB; 50 Larry Kubin OLB; 57 Rich Milot OLB; 52 Neal Olkewicz MLB; Defensive backs (DB): 48 Ken Coffey SS; 32 Vernon Dean CB; 28 Darrell Green CB; 22 Curtis Jordan FS; 29 Mark Murphy FS; 26 Ricky Smith CB; 24 Anthony Washington CB; 47 Greg Williams SS; Special teams (ST): 5 Jeff Hayes P; 3 Mark Moseley K	Reserve: -- Brian Allen WR (IR); 53 Jeff Bostic C (IR); -- Jerry Bullitt LB (IR); 89 Alvin Garrett WR (IR); 64 Steve Hamilton DE (IR); -- Greg Jones RB (NF-Inj.); 12 Babe Laufenberg QB (IR); 79 Todd Liebenstein DE (IR); -- Jeff Pegues LB (IR); 23 Tony Peters S (IR); -- Bruce Radford DE (IR); -- Curt Singer T (IR); -- Bob Slater DT (IR); 62 Morris Towns T (IR); 84 Mike Williams TE (IR); Rookies in italics

== Regular season ==
=== Schedule ===
Week	Date	Opponent	Result	Record	Venue	Attendance	Game recap
1	September 2	Miami Dolphins	**L** 17–35	0–1	RFK Stadium	52,683	Recap
2	September 10	at San Francisco 49ers	**L** 31–37	0–2	Candlestick Park	59,707	Recap
3	September 16	**New York Giants**	**W** 30–14	1–2	RFK Stadium	52,997	Recap
4	September 23	at New England Patriots	**W** 26–10	2–2	Sullivan Stadium	60,503	Recap
5	September 30	**Philadelphia Eagles**	**W** 20–0	3–2	RFK Stadium	53,064	Recap
6	October 7	at Indianapolis Colts	**W** 35–7	4–2	RCA Dome	60,012	Recap
7	October 14	**Dallas Cowboys**	**W** 34–14	5–2	RFK Stadium	55,431	Recap
8	October 21	at **St. Louis Cardinals**	**L** 24–26	5–3	Busch Memorial Stadium	50,262	Recap
9	October 28	at **New York Giants**	**L** 13–37	5–4	Giants Stadium	76,192	Recap
10	November 5	Atlanta Falcons	**W** 27–14	6–4	RFK Stadium	51,301	Recap
11	November 11	Detroit Lions	**W** 28–14	7–4	RFK Stadium	50,212	Recap
12	November 18	at **Philadelphia Eagles**	**L** 10–16	7–5	Veterans Stadium	63,117	Recap
13	November 25	Buffalo Bills	**W** 41–14	8–5	RFK Stadium	51,513	Recap
14	November 29	at Minnesota Vikings	**W** 31–17	9–5	Hubert H. Humphrey Metrodome	55,017	Recap
15	December 9	at **Dallas Cowboys**	**W** 30–28	10–5	Texas Stadium	64,286	Recap
16	December 16	**St. Louis Cardinals**	**W** 29–27	11–5	RFK Stadium	54,299	Recap

Note: Intra-division opponents are in bold text.

==== Week 1 (Sunday, September 2, 1984): vs. Miami Dolphins ====
Week 1: Miami Dolphins at Washington Redskins

Quarter	1	2	3	4	Total
Dolphins (1–0)	7	7	21	0	**35**
Redskins (0–1)	0	10	0	7	**17**

at RFK Stadium • Washington, D.C.

- Date: September 2, 1984
- Game time: 1:00 p.m. EDT
- Game weather: 76 °F (24 °C); relative humidity 62%; wind 10 miles per hour (16 km/h; 8.7 kn)
- Game attendance: 52,683
- Referee: Bob McElwee
- TV announcers (NBC): Charlie Jones (play-by-play) and Bob Griese (color commentator)

Team	Category	Player	Statistics
MIA	Passing	Dan Marino	21/28, 311 YDS, 5 TDs
MIA	Rushing	Andra Franklin	13 CAR, 48 YDS
MIA	Receiving	Mark Duper	6 REC, 178 YDS, 2 TDs
WSH	Passing	Joe Theismann	21/36, 204 YDS, 2 INTs
WSH	Rushing	John Riggins	15 CAR, 98 TDS, 1 TD
WSH	Receiving	Charlie Brown	6 REC, 60 YDS

Scoring summary

Quarter	Time	Drive			Team	Scoring information	Score	
Quarter	Time	Plays	Yards	TOP	Team	Scoring information	MIA	WSH
1	1:44	6	69	3:20	Dolphins	Duper 26-yard touchdown reception from Marino, von Schamann kick good	7	0
2	11:12	10	80	5:32	Redskins	Riggins 1-yard touchdown run, Moseley kick good	7	7
2	3:13	11	71	5:44	Redskins	32-yard field goal by Moseley	7	10
2	2:06	3	82	1:07	Dolphins	Duper 74-yard touchdown reception from Marino, von Schamann kick good	14	10
3	11:13	7	68	3:47	Dolphins	Jensen 6-yard touchdown reception from Marino, von Schamann kick good	21	10
3	5:52	6	43	3:48	Dolphins	Clayton 9-yard touchdown reception from Marino, von Schamann kick good	28	10
3	3:10	3	7	1:25	Dolphins	Jensen 4-yard touchdown reception from Marino, von Schamann kick good	35	10
4	7:16	6	49	2:57	Redskins	Washington 4-yard touchdown run, Moseley kick good	35	17
"TOP" = time of possession. For other American football terms, see Glossary of American football.							35	17

- Point spread: Redskins by 4½
- Over/under: 46.0 **(over)**
- Time of game: 2 hours, 45 minutes

Dolphins	Game statistics	Redskins
18	First downs	23
30–86	Rushes–yards	29–156
311	Passing yards	204
21–28–0	Passes	21–36–2
0–0	Sacked–yards	2–11
311	Net passing yards	193
397	Total yards	349
152	Return yards	148
5–45.8	Punts	4–43.8
0–0	Fumbles–lost	1–1
4–45	Penalties–yards	3–20
28:48	Time of Possession	31:12

==== Week 2 (Monday, September 10, 1984): at San Francisco 49ers ====
Week 2: Washington Redskins at San Francisco 49ers

Quarter	1	2	3	4	Total
Redskins (0–2)	0	3	14	14	**31**
49ers (2–0)	14	13	0	10	**37**

at Candlestick Park • San Francisco, California

- Date: September 10, 1984
- Game time: 9:00 p.m. EDT
- Game weather: 68 °F (20 °C); wind 17 mph
- Game attendance: 59,707
- Referee: Dick Jorgensen
- TV announcers (ABC): Frank Gifford (play-by-play), Don Meredith (color commentator) and O. J. Simpson (color commentator)

Team	Category	Player	Statistics
WSH	Passing	Joe Theismann	24/43, 331 YDS, 2 TDs
WSH	Rushing	Joe Theismann	7 CAR, 35 YDS
WSH	Receiving	Art Monk	10 REC, 200 YDS
SF	Passing	Joe Montana	24/40, 381 YDS, 2 TDs
SF	Rushing	Wendell Tyler	20 CAR, 96 YDS, 1 TD
SF	Receiving	Dwight Clark	5 REC, 105 YDS, 1 TD

Scoring summary

Quarter	Time	Drive			Team	Scoring information	Score	
Quarter	Time	Plays	Yards	TOP	Team	Scoring information	WSH	SF
1	10:45				49ers	Tyler 1-yard touchdown run, Wersching kick good	0	7
1	3:49				49ers	Tyler 5-yard touchdown reception from Montana, Wersching kick good	0	14
2	13:21				49ers	19-yard field goal by Wersching	0	17
2	5:46				49ers	46-yard field goal by Wersching	0	20
2	1:46				49ers	Clark 15-yard touchdown reception from Montana, Wersching kick good	0	27
2	0:00				Redskins	38-yard field goal by Moseley	3	27
3	10:46				Redskins	Brown 14-yard touchdown reception from Theismann, Moseley kick good	10	27
3	5:05				Redskins	Riggins 1-yard touchdown run, Moseley kick good	17	27
4	14:51				49ers	Montana 9-yard touchdown run, Wersching kick good	17	34
4	11:42				Redskins	Riggins 1-yard touchdown run, Moseley kick good	24	34
4	9:49				49ers	38-yard field goal by Wersching	24	37
4	3:44				Redskins	Seay 12-yard touchdown reception from Theismann, Moseley kick good	31	37
"TOP" = time of possession. For other American football terms, see Glossary of American football.							31	37

- Point spread: 49ers by 2
- Over/under: 52.0 **(over)**
- Time of game:

Redskins	Game statistics	49ers
20	First downs	30
21–62	Rushes–yards	40–167
331	Passing yards	381
24–43–0	Passes	24–40–0
4–22	Sacked–yards	2–14
309	Net passing yards	367
371	Total yards	534
132	Return yards	74
7–36.6	Punts	3–34.7
3–0	Fumbles–lost	3–2
6–60	Penalties–yards	6–50
25:15	Time of Possession	34:45

==== Week 7 (Sunday, October 14, 1984): vs. Dallas Cowboys ====
Week 7: Dallas Cowboys at Washington Redskins

Quarter	1	2	3	4	Total
Cowboys (4–3)	7	0	0	7	**14**
Redskins (5–2)	7	10	10	7	**34**

at RFK Stadium • Washington, D.C.

- Date: October 14, 1984
- Game time: 4:00 p.m. EDT
- Game weather: 63 degrees, relative humidity 61%, wind 14 mph
- Game attendance: 55,431
- Referee: Jerry Markbreit
- TV announcers (CBS): Pat Summerall (play-by-play) and John Madden (color commentator)
- Pro-Football-Reference.com

Game information

Cowboys

Redskins

Scoring summary

Quarter	Time	Drive			Team	Scoring information	Score	
Quarter	Time	Plays	Yards	TOP	Team	Scoring information	DAL	WSH
"TOP" = time of possession. For other American football terms, see Glossary of American football.							14	34

Time of Game:

==== Week 10 (Monday, November 5, 1984): vs. Atlanta Falcons ====
Week 10: Atlanta Falcons at Washington Redskins

Quarter	1	2	3	4	Total
Falcons (3–7)	0	7	7	0	**14**
Redskins (6–4)	0	14	6	7	**27**

at RFK Stadium • Washington, D.C.

- Date: November 5, 1984
- Game time: 9:00 p.m. EST
- Game weather: 60 degrees, relative humidity 81%, wind 10 mph
- Game attendance: 51,301
- Referee: Red Cashion
- TV announcers (ABC): Frank Gifford (play-by-play), Don Meredith (color commentator) and O. J. Simpson (color commentator)
- Pro-Football-Reference.com

Game information

Falcons

Redskins

Scoring summary

Quarter	Time	Drive			Team	Scoring information	Score	
Quarter	Time	Plays	Yards	TOP	Team	Scoring information	ATL	WSH
"TOP" = time of possession. For other American football terms, see Glossary of American football.							14	27

Time of Game:

==== Week 15 (Sunday, December 9, 1984): at Dallas Cowboys ====
Week 15: Washington Redskins at Dallas Cowboys

Quarter	1	2	3	4	Total
Redskins (10–5)	0	6	17	7	**30**
Cowboys (9–6)	7	14	0	7	**28**

at Texas Stadium • Irving, Texas

- Date: December 9, 1984
- Game time: 4:00 p.m. EST
- Game weather: 58 degrees, relative humidity 67%, wind 13 mph
- Game attendance: 64,286
- Referee: Tom Dooley
- TV announcers (CBS): Pat Summerall (play-by-play) and John Madden (color commentator)
- Pro-Football-Reference.com

Game information

Redskins

Cowboys

Scoring summary

Quarter	Time	Drive			Team	Scoring information	Score	
Quarter	Time	Plays	Yards	TOP	Team	Scoring information	WSH	DAL
"TOP" = time of possession. For other American football terms, see Glossary of American football.							30	28

Time of Game:

==== Week 16 (Sunday, December 16, 1984): vs. St. Louis Cardinals ====
Week 16: St. Louis Cardinals at Washington Redskins

Quarter	1	2	3	4	Total
Cardinals (9-7)	0	7	10	10	**27**
**Redskins (11-5)**	6	17	3	3	**29**

at Robert F. Kennedy Memorial Stadium

- Date: Sunday, December 16, 1984
- Game time: 1:00pm(ET)
- Game weather: 45 °F (7 °C), relative humidity 93%, wind 10 mph (16 km/h)
- Referee: Jerry Markbreit

== Playoffs ==
Round	Date	Opponent (seed)	Result	Venue	Attendance	Game recap
Divisional	December 30	Chicago Bears	L 19–23	RFK Stadium	55,431	Recap

=== NFC Divisional Playoffs (Sunday, December 30, 1984): vs. Chicago Bears ===
NFC Divisional Playoffs: Chicago Bears at Washington Redskins

Quarter	1	2	3	4	Total
Bears (11–6)	0	10	13	0	23
Redskins (11–6)	3	0	14	2	19

at RFK Stadium • Washington, D.C.

- Date: December 30, 1984
- Game time: 12:30 p.m. EST
- Game weather: 57 °F (14 °C), overcast
- Game attendance: 55,431
- Referee: Fred Silva
- TV announcers (CBS): Frank Glieber (play-by-play), Dick Vermeil (color commentator) and Irv Cross (sideline reporter)
- Pro-Football-Reference.com

Game information

Bears

Redskins

Scoring summary

Quarter	Time	Drive			Team	Scoring information	Score	
Quarter	Time	Plays	Yards	TOP	Team	Scoring information	CHI	WSH
1	7:57				Redskins	35-yard field goal by Moseley	0	3
2	11:29				Bears	34-yard field goal by Thomas	3	3
2	2:00				Bears	Dunsmore 19-yard touchdown reception from Payton, Thomas kick good	10	3
3	14:34				Bears	Gault 75-yard touchdown reception from Fuller, Thomas kick no good	16	3
3	9:35				Redskins	Riggins 1-yard touchdown run, Moseley kick good	16	10
3	4:05				Bears	McKinnon 16-yard touchdown reception from Fuller, Thomas kick good	23	10
3	0:05				Redskins	Riggins 1-yard touchdown run, Moseley kick good	23	17
4	8:08	—	—	—	Redskins	Finzer stepped out of the end zone	23	19
"TOP" = time of possession. For other American football terms, see Glossary of American football.							23	19

== Standings ==
NFC East
	W	L	T	PCT	DIV	CONF	PF	PA	STK
^{(2)} Washington Redskins	11	5	0	.688	5–3	8–4	426	310	W4
^{(5)} New York Giants	9	7	0	.563	5–3	7–7	299	301	L2
St. Louis Cardinals	9	7	0	.563	5–3	6–6	423	345	L1
Dallas Cowboys	9	7	0	.563	3–5	7–5	308	308	L2
Philadelphia Eagles	6	9	1	.406	2–6	3–8–1	278	320	L1

== Awards and records ==
- Art Monk, NFL Receptions Leader (106)
- John Riggins, NFL Rushing TD Leader (14, Tied)

=== Milestones ===
- Art Monk, 1st 100 Reception Season
- John Riggins, breaks 10,000 career rushing yards
- First season sweep over the Dallas Cowboys in franchise history.
- Joe Theismann becomes Redskins all-time leader in passing attempts, passing completions and passing yards.
