= Rodell Thomas =

American football player (born 1958)

No. 53, 59, 54
- Position: Linebacker

Personal information
- Born: August 2, 1958 (age 68); Quincy, Florida, U.S.
- Listed height: 6 ft 2 in (1.88 m)
- Listed weight: 225 lb (102 kg)

Career information
- High school: Quincy
- College: Alabama State
- NFL draft: 1981: undrafted

Career history
- Miami Dolphins (1981); Seattle Seahawks (1981–1982); Miami Dolphins (1983–1984)

Career NFL statistics
- Sacks: 1
- Fumble recoveries: 4
- Touchdowns: 1
- Stats at Pro Football Reference

Rodell Thomas (born August 2, 1958) is an American former professional football player who was a linebacker in the National Football League (NFL). He played college football for the Alabama State Hornets]. He played in the NFL for the Miami Dolphins in 1981 and from 1983 to 1984 and for the Seattle Seahawks from 1981 to 1982.
