= Michael Downs =

American football player (born 1959)

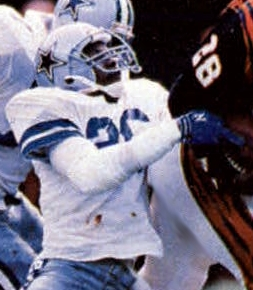
- Downs with the Dallas Cowboys in 1985

No. 26
- Position: Safety

Personal information
- Born: June 9, 1959 (age 67); Dallas, Texas, U.S.
- Listed height: 6 ft 3 in (1.91 m)
- Listed weight: 205 lb (93 kg)

Career information
- High school: South Oak Cliff (Dallas)
- College: Rice
- NFL draft: 1981: undrafted

Career history
- Dallas Cowboys (1981–1988); Phoenix Cardinals (1989)

Awards and highlights
- Second-team All-Pro (1984); NFL All-rookie team (1981); All-SWC (1980)

Career NFL statistics
- Games played: 121
- Interceptions: 35
- Fumble recoveries: 14
- Stats at Pro Football Reference

Michael Lynn Downs (born June 9, 1959) is an American former professional football player who was a safety in the National Football League (NFL) for the Dallas Cowboys and Phoenix Cardinals. He played college football for the Rice Owls.

== Early life and college ==
Downs graduated from South Oak Cliff High School in Dallas, Texas. In football, he served as a team captain and was named All-District as a senior. He also lettered in track and field. He was a member of the Honor Society.

He accepted a football scholarship from Rice University, where he became a three-year starter at safety. As a sophomore, he intercepted 3 passes in a game against Texas Christian University, tying a single-game school record.

As a senior, he was named a co-captain and although he was limited with a pinched nerve in his neck, he received All-Southwest Conference and honorable-mention All-American honors. He finished his college career with 9 interceptions (third in school history).

He graduated in 1981 with a BA in Business Management, Political Science and Physical Education.

== Professional career ==
=== Dallas Cowboys ===
Downs was signed as an undrafted free agent by the Dallas Cowboys after the 1981 NFL draft. He wasn't selected because he suffered a pinched nerve in his shoulder as a senior, which affected his play and earned him a reputation for not being aggressive. He was so impressive in training camp, that he became the third rookie in Cowboys history to begin the season as a starter at free safety, after Randy Hughes suffered a dislocated right shoulder and Dextor Clinkscale an Achilles injury in pre-season. His performance also allowed the team to move Dennis Thurman from free safety to cornerback.

He was a playmaker from the start, intercepting a Joe Theismann pass in the first quarter of a 26–10 win against the Washington Redskins in the season opener. He missed the second game with a hamstring injury. He had a stretch of three straight games with an interception and would go on to intercept a total of 7 passes (third on the team, tied for seventh in the league), while contributing to the Cowboys leading the NFL in interceptions and setting a franchise record. Against the Chicago Bears, his 15 total tackles and 13 solo tackles were club season highs. He also posted 110 tackles (second on the team), 72 solo tackles (led the team), 11 passes defensed and one fumble recovery. He intercepted a pass against the Tampa Bay Buccaneers in the playoffs. He was named to the All-Rookie team.

In 1982, he collected 70 tackles (led the team), one sack, 3 fumble recoveries (led the team) and one interception. Against the Tampa Bay Buccaneers, he had 15 tackles (club season high), he forced a fumble and recovered another one at the two-yard line with five seconds left to preserve a 14-9 win. Against the Houston Oilers, he recovered a fumble and returned it 86 yards for a touchdown (second longest in franchise history).

In 1983, he registered 111 tackles (third on the team), 4 interceptions (tied for third on the team), 1.5 sacks and 3 forced fumbles (led the team). He returned a fumbled kickoff 10 yards for a touchdown in the third game against the New York Giants.

In 1984, he had his best season, compiling 136 tackles (led the team), 96 solo tackles, 7 interceptions (led the team), 3.5 sacks, 13 passes defensed, 3 forced fumbles and 2 fumble recoveries. Against the New Orleans Saints, Downs helped the team rally back from a 27-6 fourth-quarter deficit to win 30–27 in overtime, by making 9 tackles, 2 interceptions, one pass defensed, one fumble recovery and also recovered a blocked punt. Even though he wasn't voted to the Pro Bowl, he received second-team All-Pro and All-NFC honors.

In 1985, quarterback Danny White nicknamed Thurman along with Downs and cornerbacks Everson Walls, Ron Fellows, "Thurman's Thieves", for their opportunistic play in the secondary. Downs was named a defensive co-captain, posting 116 tackles, 69 solo tackles (tied for the team lead), 3 interceptions, 3 fumble recoveries and 2 forced fumbles (tied for the team lead).

In 1986, he recorded 101 tackles, one sack, 6 interceptions (led the team), one fumble recovery and one blocked punt. In 1987, he had 86 tackles (led the team), 4 interceptions (second on the team) and one fumble recovery.

In 1988, he tallied 90 tackles (fourth on the team), 2 interceptions (tied for the team lead), 10 passes defensed (fourth on the team), one fumble recovery and one special teams tackle.

In 1989, with the arrival of Jimmy Johnson, he was released as part of a youth movement on May 5.

During his time with the Cowboys, Downs helped anchor the secondary for most of the eighties decade. He was considered one of the best tacklers in the NFL, leading the team secondary for seven consecutive seasons (1981 to 1987), making over 100 tackles in 5 seasons and leading the team in tackles in 3 seasons. He finished with 34 interceptions (tied for fifth in franchise history) and 3 touchdowns (one from an interception return and 2 from fumble returns).

=== Phoenix Cardinals ===
On September 26, 1989, he was signed as a free agent by the Phoenix Cardinals, after Lonnie Young broke his left shoulder in the season-opener. He reunited with Gene Stallings (former Cowboys' secondary coach, then the Cardinals' head coach) and Dennis Thurman (former Cowboys' defensive back, then Cardinals' secondary coach). In the eighth game of the season, the Cardinals came into Texas Stadium and defeated the Cowboys 19-10. He was waived on October 31, after appearing in 5 games with one interception.
