= 1984 NFL season =

American football season

Regular season
- Duration: September 2 – December 17, 1984

Playoffs
- Start date: December 23, 1984
- AFC Champions: Miami Dolphins
- NFC Champions: San Francisco 49ers

Super Bowl XIX
- Date: January 20, 1985
- Site: Stanford Stadium, Stanford, California
- Champions: San Francisco 49ers

Pro Bowl
- Date: January 27, 1985
- Site: Aloha Stadium

AFC teams: West, Central, East
NFC teams: West, Central, East

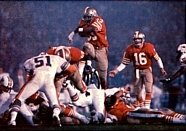
The 49ers playing against the Dolphins in Super Bowl XIX.

The 1984 NFL season was the 65th regular season of the National Football League. The Colts relocated from Baltimore, Maryland, to Indianapolis, Indiana, before the season.

The season ended with Super Bowl XIX when the San Francisco 49ers defeated the Miami Dolphins 38–16 at Stanford Stadium in California. This was the first Super Bowl televised by ABC, who entered into the annual championship game rotation with CBS and NBC. This game marked the second shortest distance between the Super Bowl host stadium (Stanford, California) and a Super Bowl team (San Francisco 49ers).

The 49ers became the first team in NFL history to win 15 games in a regular season and to win 18 in an entire season (including the postseason). Additionally, two major offensive records were set this season, with quarterback Dan Marino establishing a new single-season passing yards record with 5,084 (later broken by Drew Brees in 2011, 2012, 2013 and 2016, by Tom Brady in 2011, by Peyton Manning in 2013, by Ben Roethlisberger and Patrick Mahomes in 2018 and by Jameis Winston in 2019) and Eric Dickerson establishing a new single-season rushing yards record with 2,105. Another statistical record broken was Mark Gastineau for most sacks in a single season, with 22 (surpassed by Michael Strahan in 2001, T.J. Watt in 2021, and Myles Garrett in 2025).

Also during the season, San Diego Chargers wide receiver Charlie Joiner became the all-time leader in career receptions; he set that mark in a game between the Chargers and the Pittsburgh Steelers at Pittsburgh's Three Rivers Stadium.

In a week 10 game against the Kansas City Chiefs, the Seattle Seahawks set numerous NFL records for interception returns, including most interception return yardage in a game and most interceptions returned for touchdowns in a game with 4 (all touchdowns over 50 yards in length). The Seahawks also tied an NFL record with 63 defensive takeaways on the season.

Salaries increased significantly over the past two seasons in the NFL, up nearly fifty percent; new Houston Oilers quarterback Warren Moon led the list at $1.1 million.

== Player movement ==
=== Transactions ===
- February 4, 1984: Warren Moon signs a contract with the Houston Oilers.

=== Trades ===
- February 18, 1984: The New Orleans Saints acquire quarterback Richard Todd in a trade with the New York Jets.
- February 23, 1984: The Pittsburgh Steelers acquire David Woodley in a trade with the Miami Dolphins.
- October 10, 1984: The Houston Oilers traded running back Earl Campbell to the New Orleans Saints in exchange for their top choice in the 1985 NFL draft.

=== Retirements ===
- July 24, 1984: Four-time Super Bowl champion Terry Bradshaw announces his retirement.

=== Draft ===
The 1984 NFL draft was held from May 1 to May 2, 1984, at New York City's Omni Park Central Hotel. With the first pick, the New England Patriots selected wide receiver Irving Fryar from the University of Nebraska–Lincoln.

=== Supplemental draft of USFL and CFL players ===
In an attempt to head off a bidding war within its own ranks for United States Football League and Canadian Football League players, a one-time supplemental draft of USFL and CFL players was held on June 5, 1984. This supplemental draft was especially designed for players who would have been eligible for the regular NFL draft but had already signed a contract with a USFL team after being selected in 1984 USFL draft earlier on January 4. NFL owners did not want to risk potentially "wasting" picks in the regular draft on players who were already signed by another league, but also wanted to ensure there would not be a large influx of free agent talent in case the new rival league suddenly collapsed. With the first pick, the Tampa Bay Buccaneers selected quarterback Steve Young from BYU, who previously was selected by the Los Angeles Express with the 11th pick in the USFL draft. Young would eventually join the Buccaneers in summer 1985 soon after the Express suspended operations.

== Major rule changes ==
- The league's jersey numbering system was modified to allow linebackers to wear numbers 90 to 99, in addition to 50 to 59.
- The penalty for a kickoff or onside kick that goes out of bounds is 5 yards from the previous spot and a re-kick must be made. However, if the second (or more) kickoff or onside kick goes out of bounds, the receiving team may choose instead to take possession of the ball at the out of bounds spot.
- Leaping to try to block a field goal or an extra point is illegal unless the defensive player was lined up at the line of scrimmage.
- A kicker or holder who fakes being roughed or run into by a defensive player can receive an unsportsmanlike conduct penalty.
- Unsportsmanlike conduct will also be called for any prolonged, excessive, or premeditated celebration by individual players or a group of players. This is usually referred to as the "Mark Gastineau Rule" because a major reason why this change was made was to stop him from performing his signature "Sack Dance" every time after he sacked an opposing quarterback. This rule was instituted after Rams offensive tackle Jackie Slater pushed New York Jets defensive end Mark Gastineau, who after sacking Rams quarterback Vince Ferragamo, performed his sack dance, igniting a brawl. This occurred during a week 4 game between the Rams and the Jets. This also referred to the Washington Redskins "Fun Bunch".

== 1984 deaths ==
- David Overstreet was killed in a car accident on June 24, 1984. He was driving northbound in his 1980 Mercedes on Texas State Highway 155, when his car swerved off the road about 10 miles northeast of Tyler into gasoline pumps at a service station and exploded. The Dolphins wore a helmet decal with the number 20 in his memory during their 1984 season in which they reached Super Bowl XIX.
  - This was the third offseason in four years in which an active Dolphins player died. Linebacker Rusty Chambers was killed in a July 1981 automobile accident, and linebacker Larry Gordon died of a heart attack while jogging in June 1983.
- Ricky Bell died November 28, 1984, at the age of 29 due to complications caused by dermatomyositis. Bell was the first overall selection in the 1977 draft by the Tampa Bay Buccaneers following an All-America career at USC. Bell played for coach John McKay at USC and Tampa Bay.
- Kirk Collins died on February 22, 1984. Collins had been a defensive back for the Los Angeles Rams. Collins emerged as a starter despite being drafted in the seventh round of the 1980 draft. Collins had been diagnosed with Esophageal cancer the previous season.

== Division races ==
From 1970 to 2001, there were three divisions (Eastern, Central and Western) in each conference. The winners of each division, and a fourth "wild card" team based on the best non-division winner, qualified for the playoffs. The tiebreaker rules were changed to start with head-to-head competition, followed by division records, records against common opponents, and records in conference play.

=== National Football Conference ===
Week	Eastern		Central		Western		Wild Card (Home)		Wild Card (Road)	
1	Dallas, N.Y. Giants	1–0–0	Chicago, Green Bay	1–0–0	Atlanta, San Francisco	1–0–0				
2	N.Y. Giants	2–0–0	Chicago	2–0–0	San Francisco	2–0–0				
3	Dallas, N.Y. Giants, St. Louis	2–1–0	Chicago	3–0–0	San Francisco	3–0–0	Dallas, N.Y. Giants, St. Louis	2–1–0	Dallas, N.Y. Giants, St. Louis	2–1–0
4	Dallas, N.Y. Giants	3–1–0	Chicago	3–1–0	San Francisco	4–0–0	Dallas, N.Y. Giants	3–1–0	6 Teams	2–2–0
5	Dallas	4–1–0	Chicago	3–2–0	San Francisco	5–0–0	New Orleans, N.Y. Giants, L.A. Rams, Washington	3–2–0	New Orleans, N.Y. Giants, L.A. Rams, Washington	3–2–0
6	Dallas, Washington	4–2–0	Chicago	4–2–0	San Francisco	6–0–0	Dallas, Washington	4–2–0	5 teams	3–3–0
7	Washington	5–2–0	Chicago	4–3–0	San Francisco	6–1–0	4 teams	4–3–0	4 teams	4–3–0
8	Dallas, Washington, St. Louis	5–3–0	Chicago	5–3–0	San Francisco	7–1–0	Dallas, Washington, St. Louis, L.A. Rams	5–3–0	Dallas, Washington, St. Louis, L.A. Rams	5–3–0
9	Dallas, St Louis	6–3–0	Chicago	6–3–0	San Francisco	8–1–0	Dallas, St Louis	6–3–0	Washington, N.Y. Giants, L.A. Rams	5–4–0
10	4 teams	6–4–0	Chicago	7–3–0	San Francisco	9–1–0	5 teams	6–4–0	5 teams	6–4–0
11	Dallas, Washington	7–4–0	Chicago	7–4–0	San Francisco	10–1–0	Dallas, Washington, L.A. Rams	7–4–0	Dallas, Washington, L.A. Rams	7–4–0
12	Dallas, Washington, N.Y. Giants	7–5–0	Chicago	8–4–0	San Francisco	11–1–0	Dallas, Washington, N.Y. Giants, L.A. Rams	7–5–0	Dallas, Washington, N.Y. Giants, L.A. Rams	7–5–0
13	Dallas, Washington, N.Y. Giants	8–5–0	Chicago	9–4–0	San Francisco	12–1–0	Dallas, Washington, N.Y. Giants, L.A. Rams	8–5–0	Dallas, Washington, N.Y. Giants, L.A. Rams	8–5–0
14	Dallas, Washington, N.Y. Giants	9–5–0	Chicago	9–5–0	San Francisco	13–1–0	Dallas, Washington, N.Y. Giants, L.A. Rams	9–5–0	Dallas, Washington, N.Y. Giants, L.A. Rams	9–5–0
15	Washington	10–5–0	Chicago	9–6–0	San Francisco	14–1–0	L.A. Rams	10–5–0	Dallas, N.Y. Giants, St. Louis	9–6–0
16	Washington	11–5–0	Chicago	10–6–0	San Francisco	15–1–0	L.A. Rams	10–6–0	N.Y. Giants	9–7–0

=== American Football Conference ===
Week	Eastern		Central		Western		Wild Card (Home)		Wild Card (Road)	
1	3 teams	1–0–0	4 teams	0–1–0	5 teams	1–0–0				
2	Miami	2–0–0	Pittsburgh	1–1–0	3 teams	2–0–0				
3	Miami	3–0–0	Pittsburgh	2–1–0	L.A. Raiders	3–0–0				
4	Miami	4–0–0	Pittsburgh	2–2–0	L.A. Raiders	4–0–0	N.Y. Jets	3–1–0	Denver, Seattle	3–1–0
5	Miami	5–0–0	Pittsburgh	3–2–0	L.A. Raiders Denver, Seattle	4–1–0	L.A. Raiders Denver, Seattle	4–1–0	New England, N.Y. Jets, San Diego	3–2–0
6	Miami	6–0–0	Pittsburgh	3–3–0	L.A. Raiders Denver	5–1–0	L.A. Raiders Denver	5–1–0	Seattle, N.Y. Jets, Sam Diego, New England	4–2–0
7	Miami	7–0–0	Pittsburgh	4–3–0	L.A. Raiders Denver	6–1–0	L.A. Raiders Denver	6–1–0	Seattle, N.Y. Jets, New England	5–2–0
8	Miami	8–0–0	Pittsburgh	4–4–0	L.A. Raiders Denver	7–1–0	L.A. Raiders Denver	7–1–0	Seattle, N.Y. Jets	6–2–0
9	Miami	9–0–0	Pittsburgh	5–4–0	Denver	8–1–0	L.A. Raiders, Seattle	7–2–0	New England, N.Y. Jets	6–3–0
10	Miami	10–0–0	Pittsburgh	6–4–0	Denver	9–1–0	Seattle	8–2–0	L.A. Raiders	7–3–0
11	Miami	11–0–0	Pittsburgh	6–5–0	Denver	10–1–0	Seattle	9–2–0	L.A. Raiders, New England	7–4–0
12	Miami	11–1–0	Pittsburgh	6–6–0	Denver	11–1–0	Seattle	10–2–0	L.A. Raiders, New England Patriots	8–4–0
13	Miami	12–1–0	Pittsburgh	7–6–0	Denver, Seattle	11–2–0	Denver, Seattle	11–2–0	L.A. Raiders	9–4–0
14	Miami	12–2–0	Pittsburgh	7–7–0	Seattle	12–2–0	Denver	11–3–0	L.A. Raiders	10–4–0
15	Miami	13–2–0	Pittsburgh	8–7–0	Denver, Seattle	12–3–0	Denver, Seattle	12–3–0	L.A. Raiders	11–4–0
16	Miami	14–2–0	Pittsburgh	9–7–0	Denver	13–3–0	Seattle	12–4–0	L.A. Raiders	11–5–0

== Preseason ==
The Pro Football Hall of Fame Game, in which the Seattle Seahawks defeated the Tampa Bay Buccaneers 38–0, was contested on July 28, 1984, and held at Fawcett Stadium in Canton, Ohio, the same city where the league was founded. The 1984 Hall of Fame Class included Willie Brown, Mike McCormack, Charley Taylor and Arnie Weinmeister.

== Regular season ==
=== Scheduling formula ===
Inter-conference
AFC East vs NFC East
AFC Central vs NFC West
AFC West vs NFC Central

Highlights of the 1984 season included:

- Thanksgiving: Two games were played on Thursday, November 22, featuring Green Bay at Detroit and New England at Dallas, with Detroit and Dallas winning.

=== Final standings ===
AFC East
	W	L	T	PCT	DIV	CONF	PF	PA	STK
^{(1)} Miami Dolphins	14	2	0	.875	8–0	10–2	513	298	W2
New England Patriots	9	7	0	.563	6–2	9–3	362	352	W1
New York Jets	7	9	0	.438	3–5	7–7	332	364	L1
Indianapolis Colts	4	12	0	.250	2–6	4–8	239	414	L5
Buffalo Bills	2	14	0	.125	1–7	1–11	250	454	L2

AFC Central
	W	L	T	PCT	DIV	CONF	PF	PA	STK
^{(3)} Pittsburgh Steelers	9	7	0	.563	3–3	6–6	387	310	W2
Cincinnati Bengals	8	8	0	.500	5–1	6–6	339	339	W4
Cleveland Browns	5	11	0	.313	3–3	4–8	250	297	W1
Houston Oilers	3	13	0	.188	1–5	3–9	240	437	L2

AFC West
	W	L	T	PCT	DIV	CONF	PF	PA	STK
^{(2)} Denver Broncos	13	3	0	.813	6–2	10–2	353	241	W2
^{(4)} Seattle Seahawks	12	4	0	.750	5–3	8–4	418	282	L2
^{(5)} Los Angeles Raiders	11	5	0	.688	5–3	8–4	368	278	L1
Kansas City Chiefs	8	8	0	.500	4–4	7–7	314	324	W3
San Diego Chargers	7	9	0	.438	0–8	3–9	394	413	L2

NFC East
	W	L	T	PCT	DIV	CONF	PF	PA	STK
^{(2)} Washington Redskins	11	5	0	.688	5–3	8–4	426	310	W4
^{(5)} New York Giants	9	7	0	.563	5–3	7–7	299	301	L2
St. Louis Cardinals	9	7	0	.563	5–3	6–6	423	345	L1
Dallas Cowboys	9	7	0	.563	3–5	7–5	308	308	L2
Philadelphia Eagles	6	9	1	.406	2–6	3–8–1	278	320	L1

NFC Central
	W	L	T	PCT	DIV	CONF	PF	PA	STK
^{(3)} Chicago Bears	10	6	0	.625	7–1	8–4	325	248	W1
Green Bay Packers	8	8	0	.500	5–3	8–4	390	309	W3
Tampa Bay Buccaneers	6	10	0	.375	3–5	5–9	335	380	W2
Detroit Lions	4	11	1	.281	3–5	4–7–1	283	408	L3
Minnesota Vikings	3	13	0	.188	2–6	3–9	276	484	L6

NFC West
	W	L	T	PCT	DIV	CONF	PF	PA	STK
^{(1)} San Francisco 49ers	15	1	0	.938	6–0	12–0	475	227	W9
^{(4)} Los Angeles Rams	10	6	0	.625	3–3	7–5	346	316	L1
New Orleans Saints	7	9	0	.438	1–5	4–8	298	361	W1
Atlanta Falcons	4	12	0	.250	2–4	3–9	281	382	W1

=== Tiebreakers ===
- N.Y. Giants finished ahead of St. Louis and Dallas in the NFC East based on best head-to-head record (3–1 to Cardinals' 2–2 and Cowboys' 1–3).
- St. Louis finished ahead of Dallas in the NFC East based on better division record (5–3 to Cowboys' 3–5).

== Playoffs ==
Dec 30 – Mile High Stadium
3	Pittsburgh	24
Dec 22 – Kingdome	Jan 6 – Miami Orange Bowl
2	Denver	17
AFC
5	LA Raiders	7	3	Pittsburgh	28
Dec 29 – Miami Orange Bowl
4	Seattle	13	1	Miami	45
AFC Championship
4	Seattle	10
Jan 20 – Stanford Stadium
1	Miami	31
Divisional round
Wild-card round	A1	Miami	16
Dec 30 – RFK Stadium
N1	San Francisco	38
Super Bowl XIX
3	Chicago	23
Dec 23 – Anaheim Stadium	Jan 6 – Candlestick Park
2	Washington	19
NFC
5	NY Giants	16	3	Chicago	0
Dec 29 – Candlestick Park
4	LA Rams	13	1	San Francisco	23
NFC Championship
5	NY Giants	10
1	San Francisco	21

== Notable events ==
- September 30, 1984: The Colts won their first game ever at Indianapolis during a Week 5 contest against AFC East opponent, the Buffalo Bills, winning by a 31–17 margin.
- For the only time in NFL history, two teams – the Oilers and the Bills – begin the season 0–10.
  - The Oilers defeated the Chiefs in week 11. The Bills reached 0–11 before upending the Cowboys.

== Milestones ==
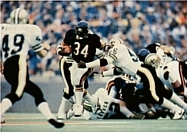
Walter Payton (34) pictured breaking the NFL's career rushing record on October 7, 1984..

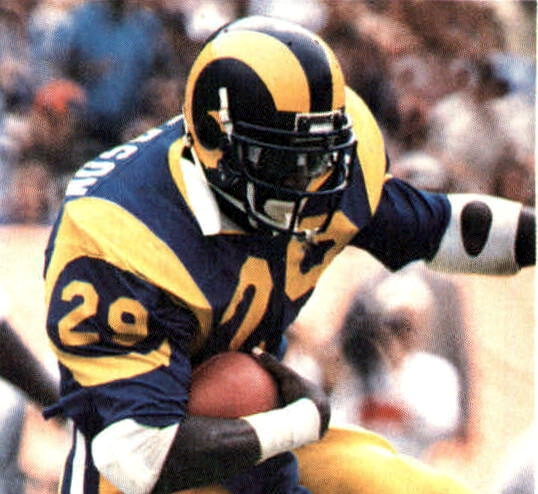
Eric Dickerson pictured in his record-breaking 1984 season, where he set the NFL record for most rushed yards.

The following players set all-time records during the season:

Most passing yards gained, season	Dan Marino, Miami (5,084)
Most passing touchdowns, season	Dan Marino, Miami (48)
Most passes completed, season	Dan Marino, Miami (362)
Most rushing yards gained, season	Eric Dickerson, Los Angeles Rams (2,105)
Most rushing attempts, season	James Wilder Sr., Tampa Bay (407)
Most pass receptions, season	Art Monk, Washington (106)
Most receiving touchdowns, season	Mark Clayton, Miami (18)
Most extra points made, season	Uwe von Schamann, Miami (66)
Most extra point attempts, season	Uwe von Schamann, Miami (70)
Most sacks, season	Mark Gastineau, New York Jets (22.0)
Most rushing yards gained, career	Walter Payton, Chicago (13,309 at the end of the season)
Most receptions, career	Charlie Joiner, San Diego (657 at the end of the season)

== Statistical leaders ==
=== Team ===
Points scored	Miami Dolphins (513)
Total yards gained	Miami Dolphins (6,936)
Yards rushing	Chicago Bears (2,974)
Yards passing	Miami Dolphins (5,018)
Fewest points allowed	San Francisco 49ers (227)
Fewest total yards allowed	Chicago Bears (3,863)
Fewest rushing yards allowed	Chicago Bears (1,377)
Fewest passing yards allowed	New Orleans Saints (2,453)

== Awards ==
Most Valuable Player	Dan Marino, quarterback, Miami
Coach of the Year	Chuck Knox, Seattle
Offensive Player of the Year	Dan Marino, quarterback, Miami
Defensive Player of the Year	Kenny Easley, safety, Seattle
Offensive Rookie of the Year	Louis Lipps, wide receiver, Pittsburgh
Defensive Rookie of the Year	Bill Maas, defensive tackle, Kansas City
Man of the Year	Marty Lyons, defensive tackle, NY Jets
Comeback Player of the Year	John Stallworth, wide receiver, Pittsburgh
Super Bowl most valuable player	Joe Montana, quarterback, San Francisco

== Coaching changes ==
=== Offseason ===
- Cincinnati Bengals: Sam Wyche replaced the resigning Forrest Gregg, who left to join the Green Bay Packers.
- Green Bay Packers: Bart Starr was fired. Forrest Gregg then joined the Packers after resigning from the Bengals.
- Houston Oilers: Hugh Campbell was hired as head coach. Ed Biles was fired after the team lost their first six games the previous season, with defensive coordinator Chuck Studley taking over as the interim head coach.
- Minnesota Vikings: Les Steckel replaced the retiring Bud Grant.

=== In-season ===
- Cleveland Browns: Sam Rutigliano was fired after starting the season 1–7, and was replaced by defensive coordinator Marty Schottenheimer.
- Indianapolis Colts: Frank Kush resigned after the team went 4–11. Offensive line coach Hal Hunter served as interim for the team's final regular season game.
- New England Patriots: Ron Meyer was fired after eight games, despite a 5–3 record, due to his team-wide alienation of players. Raymond Berry, who had been out of coaching since serving as New England's receivers coach from 1978 to 1981, was named as Meyer's replacement.

== Stadium changes ==
The relocated Indianapolis Colts moved from Baltimore's Memorial Stadium to the Hoosier Dome in Indianapolis.

The New York Jets moved their home games from Shea Stadium in New York City to Giants Stadium in East Rutherford, New Jersey, sharing it with the Giants.

== Uniform changes ==
- The Atlanta Falcons switched from white to black face masks.
- The Buffalo Bills switched from white helmets to red, primarily to help quarterback Joe Ferguson distinguish his teammates from the white helmets also worn by AFC East rivals Indianapolis Colts, Miami Dolphins, and New England Patriots.
- The Chicago Bears permanently added "GSH" to the left sleeve of the jerseys, in memory of longtime owner and coach George Halas. The Bears also added navy blue pants to wear with their white jerseys, in addition to white socks to match the white jersey's sleeve coloring.
- The Cleveland Browns added new striping patterns to their brown and white jerseys, and white pants. Outlines were also added to the numbers. During the preseason, the numbers on the brown jerseys were orange trimmed with white; however, complaints about the numbers being too difficult to read prompted the color scheme to be reversed for the regular season. They also stopped using orange pants and instead wore white pants with both the brown and white jerseys. Brown-topped socks were worn with the brown jerseys, and orange-topped socks were worn with the white jerseys.
- The Detroit Lions switched from gray to blue face masks.
- The Green Bay Packers added player numbers to their pants at the hip, similar to the Dallas Cowboys, also adding a small gold stripe on the inner white stripe of the pants. The "TV numbers" on the jerseys were moved from the sleeves to the shoulders, and the "G" monogram on the helmets was superimposed on the jersey sleeves.
- The Minnesota Vikings wore white shoes for the first time.
- The New England Patriots made major changes to their jerseys, reinstating the "UCLA stripes" around the shoulders (last seen in 1968), replacing the two stripes at the bottom of the sleeves which were used from 1973 to 1983. The Patriots also returned to wearing red pants with their white jerseys as they did in 1979 and '80. These uniforms remained largely unchanged through 1992, except for a change to red facemasks in 1991 and the discontinuation of the red pants in 1988 and '89.
- The San Diego Chargers modified the lightning bolt scheme on the yellow pants by adding a blue panel surrounding the white lightning bolt.

== Television ==
This was the third year under the league's five-year broadcast contracts with ABC, CBS, and NBC to televise Monday Night Football, the NFC package, and the AFC package, respectively. Howard Cosell left MNF, primarily due to the fallout of his offhand remarks about wide receiver Alvin Garrett during a 1983 broadcast that was viewed as racially insensitive. O. J. Simpson was then promoted from fill-in to full-time color commentator, joining Frank Gifford and Don Meredith in the booth. On NBC's pregame show NFL '84, Bob Costas replaced Len Berman as host. This was the last season that Phyllis George served on The NFL Today.

=== Regular season games not broadcast by Network TV ===
Date	Time	Teams	Local TV	Announcers
September 3, 1984	4:00 PM EDT	Cleveland @ Seattle	WKYC-TV (Cleveland area); KING-TV(Seattle area)	Phil Stone/Reggie Rucker (WKYC); Charlie Jones/Gene Washington (KING)
October 14, 1984	4:00 PM EDT	Buffalo @ Seattle	WKBW-TV (Buffalo area); KING-TV (Seattle area)	Rick Azar/Marv Levy (WKBW); Phil Stone/Norris Weese (KING)
