= Joe Carter (running back) =

American football player (born 1962)

No. 23
- Position: Running back

Personal information
- Born: June 23, 1962 (age 64); Starkville, Mississippi, U.S.
- Listed height: 5 ft 11 in (1.80 m)
- Listed weight: 198 lb (90 kg)

Career information
- High school: Starkville
- College: Alabama
- NFL draft: 1984: 4th round, 109th overall pick

Career history
- Miami Dolphins (1984–1986)

Career NFL statistics
- Rushing yards: 589
- Rushing average: 5
- Rushing touchdowns: 1
- Stats at Pro Football Reference

Joseph Thomas Carter (born June 23, 1962) is an American former professional football player who was a running back for the Miami Dolphins of the National Football League (NFL). He played college football for the Alabama Crimson Tide and was selected by the Dolphins in the fourth round of the 1984 NFL draft.
