= William Judson =

American football player (born 1959)

No. 49
- Position: Cornerback

Personal information
- Born: March 26, 1959 (age 67); Detroit, Michigan, U.S.
- Listed height: 6 ft 1 in (1.85 m)
- Listed weight: 189 lb (86 kg)

Career information
- College: South Carolina State
- NFL draft: 1981: 8th round, 208th overall pick

Career history
- Miami Dolphins (1981–1989); Detroit Lions (1990)*
- * Offseason or practice squad member only

Career NFL statistics
- Interceptions: 24
- Interception return yards: 368
- Touchdowns: 2
- Stats at Pro Football Reference

William Thadius Judson, Sr. (born March 26, 1959) is an American former professional football player who was a cornerback for nine seasons in the National Football League (NFL), all but one with the Miami Dolphins. He played college football for the South Carolina State Bulldogs.
