= 1985 Pro Bowl =

National Football League all-star game

1985 NFL Pro Bowl
AFC	NFC
22	14
Head coach: Chuck Noll (Pittsburgh Steelers)	Head coach: Mike Ditka (Chicago Bears)
	1	2	3	4	Total
AFC	0	9	0	13	22
NFC	0	0	7	7	14
- Date: January 27, 1985
- Stadium: Aloha Stadium; Honolulu, Hawaii
- MVP: Mark Gastineau (New York Jets)
- Referee: Chuck Heberling
- Attendance: 50,385

TV in the United States
- Network: ABC
- Announcers: Frank Gifford, Don Meredith & Lynn Swann

The 1985 Pro Bowl was the NFL's 35th annual all-star game which featured the outstanding performers from the 1984 season. The game was played on Sunday, January 27, 1985, at Aloha Stadium in Honolulu, Hawaii before a crowd of 50,385. The final score was AFC 22, NFC 14.

Chuck Noll of the Pittsburgh Steelers led the AFC team against an NFC team coached by Chicago Bears head coach Mike Ditka. The referee was Chuck Heberling.

Mark Gastineau of the New York Jets was named the game's Most Valuable Player. Players on the winning AFC team received $10,000 apiece while the NFC participants each took home $5,000.

== Game Recap ==
For 26 minutes of this game, it was scoreless, then the NFC had the ball on their own 20-yard line with 4:10 left in the first half. On first down Joe Klecko sacked Neil Lomax for an 11-yard loss, then on second down Rod Martin sacked him for an 8-yard loss and on third down Mark Gastineau tackled Eric Dickerson for a safety and an AFC 2-0 lead. Later in the game Seattle's Fred Young blocked a partial punt to set the next score as NFL MVP of 1984 Dan Marino threw a 6-yard touchdown pass to Marcus Allen as the AFC head to the locker room with a 9-0 lead at Halftime.

In the second half especially the third quarter, the NFC mounted the best drive of the game as it went 66 yards on 12 plays and capping it off with a 13-yard touchdown pass from Super Bowl XIX MVP Joe Montana to James Lofton with 8:04 left in period three. Then the NFC went into high gear as they had a 53-yard 9-play drive that culminated with a 1-yard touchdown run by Walter Payton with 35 seconds into the fourth quarter and a 14-9 lead. But then here comes the AFC as a 56-yard pass from Marino to Marcus Allen set a successful 33-yard field goal by the Seattle Seahawks Norm Johnson to cut the NFC lead to 14-12.

Now the NFC was driving trying to put this exhibition game out of reach, but with 5:15 left in the game and with the NFC at the AFC 15-yard line on third, Montano tried to hand off to 1984 record breaking sensation Eric Dickerson, but the two collided causing a fumble, and Art Still picked it up and ran 83 yards for a touchdown and the AFC took the lead 19-14. In the closing minutes, the AFC lead by the game's MVP Mark Gastineau shut down the NFC the rest of the way and Norm Johnson's 22-yard field goal with 43 seconds left in the game gave the AFC the victory and close the book on the 1984 NFL Season.

The game was televised on ABC's Wide World of Sports, and it was also the last telecast of Don Meredith's broadcasting career.

== AFC roster ==
=== Offense ===
Position	Starter(s)	Reserve(s)
Quarterback	13 Dan Marino, Miami	17 Dave Krieg, Seattle
Running back	32 Marcus Allen, L. A. Raiders; 23 Sammy Winder, Denver	28 Greg Bell, Buffalo; 41 Earnest Jackson, San Diego; 24 Freeman McNeil, N.Y. Jets
Wide receiver	85 Mark Duper, Miami; 82 John Stallworth, Pittsburgh	89 Mark Clayton, Miami; 80 Steve Largent, Seattle
Tight end	82 Ozzie Newsome, Cleveland	46 Todd Christensen, L.A. Raiders
Offensive tackle	78 Anthony Muñoz, Cincinnati; 76 Brian Holloway, New England	70 Henry Lawrence, L. A. Raiders
Offensive guard	73 John Hannah, New England; 64 Ed Newman, Miami	63 Mike Munchak, Houston
Center	57 Dwight Stephenson, Miami	52 Mike Webster, Pittsburgh

=== Defense ===
Position	Starter(s)	Reserve(s)
Defensive end	99 Mark Gastineau, N.Y. Jets; 75 Howie Long, L.A. Raiders	67 Art Still, Kansas City
Defensive tackle	72 Joe Nash, Seattle	73 Bob Baumhower, Miami; 73 Joe Klecko, N.Y. Jets
Outside linebacker	53 Rod Martin, L.A. Raiders; 57 Mike Merriweather, Pittsburgh	56 Andre Tippett, New England
Inside linebacker	56 Robin Cole, Pittsburgh; 57 Steve Nelson, New England	77 A.J. Duhe, Miami
Cornerback	37 Lester Hayes, L.A. Raiders; 22 Mike Haynes, L.A. Raiders	22 Dave Brown, Seattle
Free safety	20 Deron Cherry, Kansas City	26 Vann McElroy, L.A. Raiders
Strong safety	45 Kenny Easley, Seattle	

=== Special teams ===
Position	Starter(s)	Reserve(s)
Punter	4 Reggie Roby, Miami	
Placekicker	9 Norm Johnson, Seattle	
Kick returner	83 Louis Lipps, Pittsburgh	
Special Teamer	50 Fredd Young, Seattle	

== NFC roster ==
=== Offense ===
Position	Starter(s)	Reserve(s)
Quarterback	16 Joe Montana, San Francisco	15 Neil Lomax, St. Louis
Running back	29 Eric Dickerson, L.A. Rams; 34 Walter Payton, Chicago	20 Wendell Tyler, San Francisco; 32 James Wilder, Tampa Bay
Wide receiver	81 Roy Green, St. Louis; 81 Art Monk, Washington	80 James Lofton, Green Bay; 82 Mike Quick, Philadelphia
Tight end	82 Paul Coffman, Green Bay	84 Doug Cosbie, Dallas
Offensive tackle	66 Joe Jacoby, Washington; 78 Mike Kenn, Atlanta	71 Keith Fahnhorst, San Francisco
Offensive guard	51 Randy Cross, San Francisco; 60 Russ Grimm, Washington	72 Kent Hill, Los Angeles Rams
Center	56 Fred Quillan, San Francisco	56 Doug Smith, Los Angeles Rams

=== Defense ===
Position	Starter(s)	Reserve(s)
Defensive end	95 Richard Dent, Chicago; 63 Lee Roy Selmon, Tampa Bay	75 Bruce Clark, New Orleans
Defensive tackle	99 Dan Hampton, Chicago	54 Randy White, Dallas
Outside linebacker	57 Rickey Jackson, New Orleans; 56 Lawrence Taylor, N. Y. Giants	58 Keena Turner, San Francisco
Inside linebacker	50 Mike Singletary, Chicago; 54 E. J. Junior, St. Louis	53 Harry Carson, N. Y. Giants
Cornerback	28 Darrell Green, Washington; 42 Ronnie Lott, San Francisco	36 Mark Haynes, N.Y. Giants
Free safety	22 Dwight Hicks, San Francisco	
Strong safety	25 Todd Bell, Chicago	27 Carlton Williamson, San Francisco

=== Special teams ===
Position	Starter(s)	Reserve(s)
Punter	10 Brian Hansen, New Orleans	
Placekicker	3 Jan Stenerud, Minnesota	
Kick returner	80 Henry Ellard, L.A. Rams	
Special Teamer	40 Bill Bates, Dallas	
