= Uwe von Schamann =

German gridiron football player (born 1956)

No. 5
- Position: Placekicker

Personal information
- Born: 23 April 1956 (age 70); Berlin, West Germany
- Listed height: 6 ft 0 in (1.83 m)
- Listed weight: 190 lb (86 kg)

Career information
- High school: Eastern Hills (Fort Worth, Texas, U.S.)
- College: Oklahoma
- NFL draft: 1979: 7th round, 189th overall pick

Career history
- Miami Dolphins (1979–1984)

Awards and highlights
- National champion (1975); 2× First-team All-Big Eight (1977, 1978)

Career NFL statistics
- Field goals made: 101
- Field goal attempts: 149
- Field goal %: 67.8
- Longest field goal: 53
- Stats at Pro Football Reference

Uwe Detlef Walter von Schamann (born 23 April 1956) is a former professional American football placekicker. He played for the Miami Dolphins of the National Football League (NFL), from 1979 to 1984.

== Early life ==
Von Schamann was born in Berlin, West Germany. He moved to Fort Worth, Texas at the age of 16. After graduating from Eastern Hills High School in 1975, he received a football scholarship to the University of Oklahoma.

== College career ==
During his college football career, he was a member of the 1975 National Championship team, and was later voted the all-time, All-Big 8 kicker. He was most noted for making a clutch game-winning kick in the final seconds of the 1977 game at Ohio State, after leading the crowd in a "block that kick" chant. In Sooner lore, this play came to be known simply as "The Kick. In 1999, von Schamann was named the All-Century Oklahoma kicker.

== Professional career ==
The Miami Dolphins drafted von Schamann with the 189th overall pick in the seventh round of the 1979 NFL draft. He played for Miami for six seasons.

As a rookie, von Schamann converted 36 of 40 extra point attempts and 21 of 29 field goal attempts in the 1979 season. In the 1980 season, he converted all 32 extra point attempts and 14 of 23 field goal attempts. In the 1981 season, he converted 37 of 38 extra point attempts and 24 of 31 field goal attempts. In the 1982 season, he converted 21 of 22 extra point attempts and 15 of 20 field goal attempts in nine games. The Dolphins made Super Bowl XVII against Washington that year. Von Schamann converted both extra point attempts and one field goal attempt in the 27–17 loss. In the 1983 season, he converted 45 of 48 extra point attempts and 18 of 27 field goal attempts.

In the 1984 season, he set an NFL record with 70 extra point attempts, converting 66 of them, records that stood until they were broken by Patriots kicker Stephen Gostkowski in 2007. The Dolphins made Super Bowl XIX against the San Francisco 49ers that year. In the 38–16 loss, von Schamann converted one extra point attempt and all three field goal attempts.

In the 1985 offseason, the Dolphins cut von Schamann. He joined the Cleveland Browns in the 1986 offseason but did not make the final roster. Von Schamann finished his NFL career with 101 of 149 field goal attempts (67%) and 237 of 250 extra points (94%), for 540 total points.

== After football ==
After his retirement from the NFL, he worked in the securities and insurance business.

In 2001, von Schamann was named Director of Development and Fundraising for the J.D. McCarty Center, a treatment facility for children with developmental disabilities.

== Career regular season statistics ==
Career high/best bold

Season	Team	G	FGM	FGA	%	LNG	XPM	XPA	%	PTS
1979	MIA	16	21	29	72.4	53	36	40	90.0	99
1980	MIA	16	14	23	60.9	48	32	32	100.0	74
1981	MIA	16	24	31	77.4	46	37	38	97.4	109
1982	MIA	9	15	20	75.0	47	21	22	95.5	66
1983	MIA	16	18	27	66.7	52	45	48	93.8	99
1984	MIA	16	9	19	47.4	37	66	70	94.3	93
Career		89	101	149	67.8	53	237	250	94.8	540

== Personal life ==
Von Schamann has a son, Duke, who has played professional baseball and represented Germany in international competitions.
