= Mark Clayton (American football, born 1961) =

American football player (born 1961)

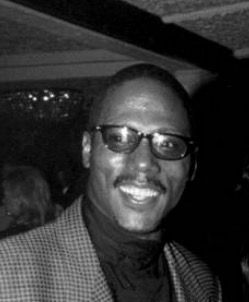

No. 83
- Position: Wide receiver

Personal information
- Born: April 8, 1961 (age 65); Indianapolis, Indiana, U.S.
- Listed height: 5 ft 9 in (1.75 m)
- Listed weight: 172 lb (78 kg)

Career information
- High school: Cathedral (Indianapolis)
- College: Louisville (1979–1982)
- NFL draft: 1983: 8th round, 223rd overall pick

Career history
- Miami Dolphins (1983–1992); Green Bay Packers (1993)

Awards and highlights
- Second-team All-Pro (1984); 5× Pro Bowl (1984–1986, 1988, 1991); 2× NFL receiving touchdowns leader (1984, 1988); Miami Dolphins Honor Roll; First-team All-South Independent (1982); Kentucky Pro Football Hall of Fame (2014)

Career NFL statistics
- Receptions: 582
- Receiving yards: 8,974
- Receiving touchdowns: 84
- Stats at Pro Football Reference

Mark Gregory Clayton (born April 8, 1961) is an American former professional football player who was a wide receiver in the National Football League (NFL), primarily with the Miami Dolphins. He played college football for the Louisville Cardinals and was selected in the eighth round of the 1983 NFL draft. He played with the Dolphins until 1992, earning five Pro Bowl and three second-team All-Pro selections. He finished his career playing one season with the Green Bay Packers in 1993.

== Early life ==
Clayton attended the University of Louisville, where he played wide receiver from 1979 to 1982. His best season was as a senior, when he made 53 catches for 1,112 yards and six touchdowns.

== Professional career ==
Clayton started his career in 1983 on the bench, appearing sporadically on offense but working as the team's primary punt returner. For the season he had six catches for 114 yards and one touchdown, while returning 60 punts for 392 yards and a touchdown. His first highlight game came on October 9 against the Buffalo Bills in a 38–35 loss; he had his first touchdown come through the air: in the third quarter, he threw a pass to Mark Duper that went 48 yards for a touchdown. In the following quarter, he would catch a 14-yard pass from Dan Marino for his first receiving touchdown.

He became a star in 1984. Playing in 15 games, he caught 73 passes for 1,389 yards for a league leading 18 touchdowns while garnering his first selection to the Pro Bowl. He made his first playoff appearance that year as the Dolphins coasted to a 14–2 record. His performance in Week 16 against the Dallas Cowboys earned him AFC Offensive Player of the Week honors. He caught just four passes for 150 yards, but three were for touchdowns, including the game winner in the fourth quarter. His eighteen touchdowns were the most by a receiver in one season until it was surpassed in 1987 by Jerry Rice; Clayton's 1984 mark is still tied for the third highest total in NFL history. In the Divisional Round game against the Seattle Seahawks, he caught five passes for 75 yards for a touchdown in the 31–10 win. The following week, he caught four passes for 95 yards and a score as they beat the Pittsburgh Steelers in the AFC Championship 45–28. In Super Bowl XIX, facing the San Francisco 49ers, he caught six passes for 92 yards, but the Dolphins failed to solve the stifling defense of the San Francisco 49ers in the 38–16 loss. Although Clayton appeared in twelve postseason games for a career, he caught just one more touchdown pass after 1984 (doing so in the 1990 Wild Card game against Kansas City).

The following year showed marked differences for Clayton. He caught 70 passes for 996 yards while scoring four times. His yards per game went from 92.6 the previous year to 62.3 (which was his lowest in a season until 1990). At any rate, he was selected to the Pro Bowl once again. This proved the case again for 1986, when he played in 15 games while catching 60 passes for 1,150 yards while scoring ten times. He experienced slowdown in the following, marred by playing just 12 games (as he was on strike from week 3 to 6). He caught 46 passes for 776 yards while scoring seven times. He renewed himself in 1988, having a Pro Bowl year with a career high 86 passes for 1,129 yards while scoring a league-leading 14 touchdowns.

He had another 1,000 yard season while playing 15 games in 1989, scoring nine times on 64 catches for 1,011 yards. He regressed to his lowest totals in 1990 by playing 10 games with 32 catches for 406 yards for three scores. He did have one more revival with the 1991 season, catching 70 passes for 1,053 yards while scoring 12 times for a fifth and final Pro Bowl selection. He ended his Miami career the next year, playing 13 games while catching 43 passes for 619 yards with three touchdowns. He moved to the Green Bay Packers for his final season in 1993 and played in 16 games. He caught 32 passes for 331 yards for three touchdowns.

Clayton finished his 11-year career with 582 receptions for 8,974 yards, along with 108 rushing yards, 40 kickoff return yards, and 485 punt return yards. He also scored 86 total touchdowns (84 receiving, one passing, and one punt return)

== Career statistics ==
Legend
	Led the league
**Bold**	Career high

Year	Team	GP	Receiving				
Year	Team	GP	Rec	Yds	Avg	Lng	TD
1983	MIA	14	6	114	19.0	39	1
1984	MIA	15	73	**1,389**	19.0	65	**18**
1985	MIA	**16**	70	996	14.2	45	4
1986	MIA	15	60	1,150	**19.2**	68	10
1987	MIA	12	46	776	16.9	43	7
1988	MIA	**16**	**86**	1,129	13.1	45	14
1989	MIA	15	64	1,011	15.8	**78**	9
1990	MIA	10	32	406	12.7	43	3
1991	MIA	**16**	70	1,053	15.0	43	12
1992	MIA	13	43	619	14.4	44	3
1993	GB	**16**	32	331	10.3	32	3
Career		158	582	8,974	15.4	78	84

== Legacy ==
Clayton holds Dolphins records for career pass receptions and touchdowns. A favorite target of Dan Marino, he paired with Mark Duper to form the popular "Marks Brothers", and they would play together for ten years. At one point in time, the Dan Marino-Mark Clayton tandem was the most prolific in NFL history.

He is one of only three players in the history of the NFL who has caught a touchdown pass from both Dan Marino and Brett Favre during the NFL regular season. The others are Keith Jackson and Mark Ingram.

In 2003, he entered the Miami Dolphins Ring of Honor, along with fellow "Marks Brother", Mark Duper on December 15, 2003. On June 20, 2014, it was announced that Clayton would be inducted into the Kentucky Pro Football Hall of Fame.

In 2005, he helped punctuate Marino's Pro Football Hall of Fame induction speech by running through the crowd and catching one last pass from Marino thrown from the stage.

He now lives in Houston, Texas, with his wife Bridget and sons Mark Gregory Clayton II and Matthew Clayton.
