= 1984 New York Giants season =

NFL team season

- Owner: Wellington Mara
- General manager: George Young
- Head coach: Bill Parcells
- Offensive coordinator: Ron Erhardt
- Home stadium: Giants Stadium

Results
- Record: 9–7
- Division place: T-2nd NFC East
- Playoffs: Won Wild Card Playoffs (at Rams) 16–13; Lost Divisional Playoffs (at 49ers) 10–21
- Pro Bowlers: 3: LB Lawrence Taylor; LB Harry Carson; CB Mark Haynes

The 1984 New York Giants season was the franchise's 60th season in the National Football League (NFL). With a 9–7 record, the Giants finished in a tie for second in the National Football Conference East Division and qualified for the playoffs. In the Wild Card round, New York traveled to Anaheim Stadium and defeated the Los Angeles Rams 16–13 to advance to the Divisional round. It was a rematch of a week five regular season game between the teams that the Rams won, 33–12, during which Los Angeles had a record three safeties.

Instead of traveling across the country back to New York, the Giants spent the week in Fresno, California. The team used the facilities at Fresno State to prepare for the San Francisco 49ers. In spite of this the Giants still lost to the 49ers 21–10.

== Offseason ==
=== NFL draft ===
1984 New York Giants draft
Round	Pick	Player	Position	College	Notes
1	3	Carl Banks *	LB	Michigan State	
1	27	William Roberts *	G	Ohio State	
3	59	Jeff Hostetler *	QB	West Virginia	
4	105	Gary Reasons	LB	Northwestern State	
7	171	Lionel Manuel	WR	Pacific	
Made roster † Pro Football Hall of Fame * Made at least one Pro Bowl during career

== Personnel ==
=== Staff ===
1984 New York Giants staff
Front office: President – Wellington Mara; General manager – George Young; Director of pro personnel – Ernie Adams; Head coaches: Head coach – Bill Parcells; Offensive coaches: Offensive coordinator – Ron Erhardt; Offensive backfield – Ray Handley; Receivers – Pat Hodgson; Offensive line – Tom Bresnahan	Defensive coaches: Defensive line – Lamar Leachman; Linebackers – Bill Belichick; Defensive backfield – Len Fontes; Special teams coaches: Special teams – Romeo Crennel; Strength and conditioning: Strength and Conditioning – Johnny Parker

=== Roster ===
1984 New York Giants roster
Quarterbacks (QB): 15 Jeff Hostetler; 17 Jeff Rutledge; 11 Phil Simms; Running backs (RB): 26 Rob Carpenter; 31 Frank Cephous; 30 Tony Galbreath; 20 Joe Morris; 21 Butch Woolfolk; Wide receivers (WR): 83 Earnest Gray; 88 Bobby Johnson; 86 Lionel Manuel; 85 John Mistler; 87 Byron Williams; Tight ends (TE): 84 Zeke Mowatt; 81 Tom Mullady	Offensive linemen (OL): 73 Kevin Belcher C; 60 Brad Benson T/G; 61 Chris Godfrey G; 62 Conrad Goode T; 69 David Jordan G; 63 Karl Nelson T; 66 William Roberts T; 59 Rich Umphrey C; Defensive linemen (DL): 64 Jim Burt NT; 79 Dee Hardison DE; 70 Leonard Marshall DE; 75 George Martin DE; 76 Curtis McGriff DE; 71 Casey Merrill DE; 78 Jerome Sally NT	Linebackers (LB): 58 Carl Banks OLB; 53 Harry Carson ILB; 54 Andy Headen OLB; 57 Byron Hunt OLB; 51 Robbie Jones ILB; 52 Joe McLaughlin ILB; 55 Gary Reasons ILB; 56 Lawrence Taylor OLB; Defensive backs (DB): 29 Bill Currier SS; 24 Kenny Daniel CB; 37 Larry Flowers FS; 48 Kenny Hill SS; 43 Terry Kinard FS; 33 LeCharls McDaniel CB; 34 Elvis Patterson CB; 44 Pete Shaw SS; 23 Perry Williams CB; Special teams (ST): 6 Ali Haji-Sheikh K; 13 Dave Jennings P	Reserve: 67 Billy Ard G (IR); -- Lawrence Green LB (IR); -- Clint Harris S (IR); 36 Mark Haynes CB (IR); 72 Gordon King T (PUP); 90 Frank Magwood WR (IR); 80 Phil McConkey WR (IR); 14 Tom Owen QB (IR); 38 John Tuggle RB (PUP); Rookies in italics

== Schedule ==
Week	Date	Opponent	Result	Record	Venue	Attendance
1	September 2	Philadelphia Eagles	W 28–27	1–0	Giants Stadium	71,520
2	September 9	Dallas Cowboys	W 28–7	2–0	Giants Stadium	75,921
3	September 16	at Washington Redskins	L 14–30	2–1	RFK Stadium	52,997
4	September 23	Tampa Bay Buccaneers	W 17–14	3–1	Giants Stadium	72,650
5	September 30	at Los Angeles Rams	L 12–33	3–2	Anaheim Stadium	53,417
6	October 8	San Francisco 49ers	L 10–31	3–3	Giants Stadium	76,112
7	October 14	at Atlanta Falcons	W 19–7	4–3	Atlanta–Fulton County Stadium	50,268
8	October 21	at Philadelphia Eagles	L 10–24	4–4	Veterans Stadium	64,677
9	October 28	Washington Redskins	W 37–13	5–4	Giants Stadium	76,192
10	November 4	at Dallas Cowboys	W 19–7	6–4	Texas Stadium	60,235
11	November 11	at Tampa Bay Buccaneers	L 17–20	6–5	Tampa Stadium	46,534
12	November 18	St. Louis Cardinals	W 16–10	7–5	Giants Stadium	73,428
13	November 25	Kansas City Chiefs	W 28–27	8–5	Giants Stadium	74,383
14	December 2	at New York Jets	W 20–10	9–5	Giants Stadium	74,975
15	December 9	at St. Louis Cardinals	L 21–31	9–6	Busch Memorial Stadium	49,973
16	December 15	New Orleans Saints	L 3–10	9–7	Giants Stadium	63,739

=== Game summaries ===
==== Week 1 vs. Eagles ====
Week One: Philadelphia Eagles (0–0) at New York Giants (0–0)

Quarter	1	2	3	4	Total
Eagles	3	3	14	7	27
Giants	7	14	0	7	28

at Giants Stadium • East Rutherford, New Jersey

- Date: September 2
- Game time: 1:00 p.m.
- Game weather: 70 °F (21.1 °C) • Wind 10 miles per hour (16 km/h; 8.7 kn)
- Game attendance: 71,520
- Referee: Pat Haggerty
- TV announcers (CBS): Pat Summerall, John Madden
- Pro-Football-Reference.com

Game information

Eagles

- Ron Jaworski
  19/33, 266 Yds, TD
- Andre Hardy
  6 Rush, 25 Yds
- Mike Quick
  8 Rec, 147 Yds, TD

Giants

- Phil Simms
  23/30, 409 Yds, 4 TD
- Butch Woolfolk
  9 Rush, 39 Yds
- Byron Williams
  5 Rec, 167 Yds, TD

Scoring summary

Quarter	Time	Drive			Team	Scoring information	Score	
Quarter	Time	Plays	Yards	TOP	Team	Scoring information	PHI	NYG
1					Eagles	47-yard field goal by Paul McFadden	3	0
1					Giants	Zeke Mowatt 24-yard touchdown reception from Phil Simms, Ali Haji-Sheikh kick good	3	7
2					Eagles	41-yard field goal by Paul McFadden	6	7
2					Giants	Byron Williams 65-yard touchdown reception from Phil Simms, Ali Haji-Sheikh kick good	6	14
2					Giants	Bobby Johnson 35-yard touchdown reception from Phil Simms, Ali Haji-Sheikh kick good	6	21
3					Eagles	Wilbert Montgomery 4-yard touchdown run, Paul McFadden kick good	13	21
3					Eagles	Mike Quick 14-yard touchdown reception from Ron Jaworski, Paul McFadden kick good	20	21
4					Giants	Bobby Johnson 16-yard touchdown reception from Phil Simms, Ali Haji-Sheikh kick good	20	28
4					Eagles	Fumble recovered in end zone by Rich Kraynak for touchdown, Paul McFadden kick good	27	28
"TOP" = time of possession. For other American football terms, see Glossary of American football.							27	28

==== Week 2 ====
Week Two: Dallas Cowboys at New York Giants – Game summary

Quarter	1	2	3	4	Total
Cowboys (1–1)	0	0	7	0	7
Giants (2–0)	14	7	7	0	28

at The Meadowlands

- Date: Sunday, September 9, 1984
- Game time: 1:00pm(ET)
- Game weather: 66 degrees, relative humidity 69%, wind 13 mph
- Game attendance: 75,921
- Referee: Jerry Seeman
- TV announcers (CBS): Jack Buck (play-by-play) and John Madden (color commentator)
- Pro-Football-Reference.com

==== Week 6 (Monday, October 8, 1984): vs San Francisco 49ers ====
Week 6: San Francisco 49ers (6–0) at New York Giants (3–3)

Quarter	1	2	3	4	Total
49ers (6–0)	21	7	3	0	31
Giants (3–3)	3	0	0	7	10

at Giants Stadium • East Rutherford, New Jersey

- Date: October 8, 1984
- Game time: 9:00 p.m. EDT
- Game weather: 60 °F (16 °C); wind 12
- Game attendance: 76,112
- Referee: Red Cashion
- TV announcers (ABC): Frank Gifford (play-by-play), Don Meredith (color commentator) and O. J. Simpson (color commentator)
- Pro-Football-Reference.com

Team	Category	Player	Statistics
SF	Passing	Joe Montana	15/24, 207 Yds, 3 TDs
SF	Rushing	Wendell Tyler	14 CAR, 101 YDS
SF	Receiving	Roger Craig	7 REC, 95 YDS, 1 TD
NYG	Passing	Phil Simms	24/43, 290 Yds, 2 INTs
NYG	Rushing	Rob Carpenter	11 CAR, 45 YDS
NYG	Receiving	Lionel Manuel	5 REC, 78 YDS

Scoring summary

Quarter	Time	Drive			Team	Scoring information	Score	
Quarter	Time	Plays	Yards	TOP	Team	Scoring information	SF	NYG
1	12:28				49ers	Tyler 59-yard touchdown reception from Montana, Wersching kick good	7	0
1	8:42				49ers	Frank 1-yard touchdown reception from Montana, Wersching kick good	14	0
1	7:27	—	—	—	49ers	McLemore 79-yard kickoff return for a touchdown, Wersching kick good	21	0
1	1:49				Giants	20-yard field goal by Haji-Sheikh	21	3
2	3:49				49ers	Craig 8-yard touchdown reception from Montana, Wersching kick good	28	3
3	9:14				49ers	37-yard field goal by Wersching	31	3
4	1:17				Giants	Woolfolk 2-yard touchdown run, Haji-Sheikh kick good	31	10
"TOP" = time of possession. For other American football terms, see Glossary of American football.							31	10

- Point spread: 49ers by 3
- Over/under: 44.0 (under)
- Time of game:

49ers	Game statistics	Giants
18	First downs	23
32–167	Rushes–yards	23–113
218	Passing yards	303
16–27–0	Passes	25–44–2
1–1	Sacked–yards	4–27
217	Net passing yards	276
384	Total yards	389
123	Return yards	142
5–39.0	Punts	5–42.4
1–0	Fumbles–lost	0–0
7–40	Penalties–yards	3–20
28:08	Time of Possession	31:52

==== Week 10 (Sunday, November 4, 1984): at Dallas Cowboys ====
Week 10: New York Giants (6–4) at Dallas Cowboys (6–4)

Quarter	1	2	3	4	Total
Giants (6–4)	6	0	7	6	19
Cowboys (6–4)	0	7	0	0	7

at Texas Stadium • Irving, Texas

- Date: November 4, 1984
- Game time: 1:00 p.m. EST
- Game weather: 61 °F (16 °C), relative humidity 78%, wind 15 mph
- Game attendance: 60,235
- Referee: Gene Barth
- TV announcers (CBS): Pat Summerall (play-by-play) and John Madden (color commentator)

Team	Category	Player	Statistics
NYG	Passing		
NYG	Rushing		
NYG	Receiving		
DAL	Passing		
DAL	Rushing		
DAL	Receiving		

Scoring summary

Quarter	Time	Drive			Team	Scoring information	Score	
Quarter	Time	Plays	Yards	TOP	Team	Scoring information	NYG	DAL
"TOP" = time of possession. For other American football terms, see Glossary of American football.							19	7

- Point spread:
- Over/under:
- Time of game:

Giants	Game statistics	Cowboys
	First downs	
	Rushes–yards	
	Passing yards	
	Passes	
	Sacked–yards	
	Net passing yards	
	Total yards	
	Return yards	
	Punts	
	Fumbles–lost	
	Penalties–yards	
	Time of possession	

==== Week 13 vs. Kansas City ====
- TV Network: NBC
- Announcers: Don Criqui and Bob Trumpy

The Giants made a late comeback to defeat the Chiefs 28–27. Rob Carpenter helped their cause with two 1-yard touchdown runs. The Chiefs were leading 27–14 and were led by Bill Kenney, who threw three touchdown passes. The Giants then rallied; first came a five-play drive that ended with Phil Simms hitting Bobby Johnson with a 22-yard touchdown pass with 7:30 left. Then the Giants took the lead with an 80-yard drive that ended with a 3-yard touchdown pass to Zeke Mowatt with 2:22 left.

== Playoffs ==
Round	Date	Opponent (seed)	Result	Record	Venue	Attendance
Wild Card	December 23	at Los Angeles Rams (4)	W 16–13	1–0	Anaheim Stadium	67,037
Divisional	December 29	at San Francisco 49ers (1)	L 10–21	1–1	Candlestick Park	60,303

=== Game summaries ===
==== NFC Divisional Playoffs (Saturday, December 29, 1984): at San Francisco 49ers ====
NFC Divisional Playoffs: New York Giants at San Francisco 49ers

Quarter	1	2	3	4	Total
Giants (10–8)	0	10	0	0	10
49ers (16–1)	14	7	0	0	21

at Candlestick Park • San Francisco, California

- Date: December 29, 1984
- Game time: 4:00 p.m. EST
- Game weather: 43 °F (6 °C); wind 9
- Game attendance: 60,303
- Referee: Gene Barth
- TV announcers (CBS): Pat Summerall (play-by-play), John Madden (color commentator) and Irv Cross (sideline reporter)
- Pro-Football-Reference.com

Team	Category	Player	Statistics
NYG	Passing	Phil Simms	25/44, 218 YDS, 2 INTs
NYG	Rushing	Joe Morris	17 CAR, 46 YDS
NYG	Receiving	Zeke Mowatt	5 REC, 49 YDS
SF	Passing	Joe Montana	25/39, 309 YDS, 3 TDs, 3 INTs
SF	Rushing	Joe Montana	3 CAR, 63 YDS
SF	Receiving	Dwight Clark	9 REC, 112 YDS, 1 TD

Scoring summary

Quarter	Time	Drive			Team	Scoring information	Score	
Quarter	Time	Plays	Yards	TOP	Team	Scoring information	NYG	SF
1	11:55				49ers	Clark 21-yard touchdown reception from Montana, Wersching kick good	0	7
1	8:12				49ers	Francis 9-yard touchdown reception from Montana, Wersching kick good	0	14
2	11:34				Giants	46-yard field goal by Haji-Sheikh	3	14
2	6:41	—	—	—	Giants	Interception returned 14 yards for touchdown by Carson, Haji-Sheikh kick good	10	14
2	4:09				49ers	Solomon 29-yard touchdown reception from Montana, Wersching kick good	10	21
"TOP" = time of possession. For other American football terms, see Glossary of American football.							10	21

- Point spread: 49ers by 12
- Over/under: 41.0 (under)
- Time of game:

Giants	Game statistics	49ers
18	First downs	22
25–87	Rushes–yards	28–131
218	Passing yards	309
25–44–2	Passes	25–39–3
6–45	Sacked–yards	4–28
173	Net passing yards	281
260	Total yards	412
178	Return yards	97
6–37.7	Punts	5–42.0
2–1	Fumbles–lost	0–0
2–25	Penalties–yards	5–29
31:29	Time of Possession	28:31

=== Standings ===
NFC East
	W	L	T	PCT	DIV	CONF	PF	PA	STK
Washington Redskins^{(2)}	11	5	0	.688	5–3	8–4	426	310	W4
New York Giants^{(5)}	9	7	0	.563	5–3	7–7	299	301	L2
St. Louis Cardinals	9	7	0	.563	5–3	6–6	423	345	L1
Dallas Cowboys	9	7	0	.563	3–5	7–5	308	308	L2
Philadelphia Eagles	6	9	1	.406	2–6	3–8–1	278	320	L1

== See also ==
- 1984 NFL season
