= 1984 Atlanta Falcons season =

NFL team season

- General manager: Tom Braatz
- Head coach: Dan Henning
- Home stadium: Fulton County Stadium

Results
- Record: 4–12
- Division place: 4th NFC West
- Playoffs: Did not qualify
- Pro Bowlers: T Mike Kenn

The 1984 Atlanta Falcons season was the franchise’s 19th season in the National Football League (NFL). The season saw Atlanta attempting to improve on its previous record of 7–9 from 1983. The Falcons would split their first six games, but then suffer a franchise-record 9-game losing streak to knock the team down to 3–12. The Falcons would win their finale against the Philadelphia Eagles and finish the season 4–12, their worst record since 1976.

== Offseason ==
=== NFL draft ===
1984 Atlanta Falcons draft
Round	Pick	Player	Position	College	Notes
1	9	Rick Bryan	Defensive end	Oklahoma	
2	32	Scott Case *	Defensive back	Oklahoma	
2	36	Thomas Benson	Linebacker	Oklahoma	
3	63	Rod McSwain	Defensive back	Clemson	
4	94	Rydell Melancon	Linebacker	LSU	
5	132	Cliff Benson	Tight end	Purdue	
6	148	Ben Bennett	Quarterback	Duke	
6	163	Dan Ralph	Defensive tackle	Oregon	
7	175	Kirk Dodge	Linebacker	UNLV	
8	206	Jeff Jackson	Linebacker	Auburn	
9	233	Glen Howe	Offensive tackle	Southern Miss	
10	260	Derrick Franklin	Defensive back	Fresno State	
11	287	Tommy Norman	Wide receiver	Jackson State	
12	318	Don Holmes	Wide receiver	Colorado Mesa	
Made roster * Made at least one Pro Bowl during career

=== NFL supplemental draft ===
The National Football League held a draft for college seniors who had already signed with either the United States Football League (USFL) or the Canadian Football League (CFL) on June 5, 1984, in New York City. The draft was for players who would have been eligible for the regular 1984 NFL draft, but who had already signed a contract with either a team from the USFL or CFL prior to it.

1984 Atlanta Falcons draft
Round	Pick	Player	Position	College	Notes
1	9	Joey Jones	Wide receiver	Alabama	
2	36	Mike McInnis	Defensive tackle	Arkansas–Pine Bluff	
3	63	Dennis Woodberry	Defensive back	Southern Arkansas	
Made roster

== Personnel ==
=== Staff ===
1984 Atlanta Falcons staff
Front office: Chairman of the board – Rankin M. Smith Sr.; President – Rankin M. Smith, Jr.; Executive vice president/chief operating officer – Eddie LeBaron; General manager – Tom Braatz; Head coaches: Head coach – Dan Henning; Offensive coaches: Quarterbacks/running backs – Steve Crosby; Receivers – Bob Harrison; Offensive line – Bob Fry; Assistant offensive line – Garry Puetz	Defensive coaches: Assistant head coach/defensive line – Dan Sekanovich; Defensive coordinator – John Marshall; Linebackers – Bobby Jackson; Secondary – Jack Stanton; Special teams coaches: Special teams – Ted Fritsch; Strength and conditioning: Strength and conditioning – George Dostal

=== Roster ===
1984 Atlanta Falcons roster
Quarterbacks (QB): 16 David Archer; 8 Bob Holly; 15 Mike Moroski; Running backs (RB): 39 Cliff Austin; 21 Lynn Cain; 42 Gerald Riggs; 32 Tim Tyrrell; Wide receivers (WR): 82 Stacey Bailey; 89 William Curran; 83 Floyd Hodge; 85 Alfred Jackson; 41 Virgil Seay; 86 Perry Tuttle; Tight ends (TE): 87 Cliff Benson; 88 Arthur Cox; 80 Mike Landrum	Offensive linemen (OL): 71 Dan Dufour T; 78 Mike Kenn T; 62 Brett Miller T; 64 Joe Pellegrini C/G; 61 John Scully G; 68 R. C. Thielemann G; 57 Jeff Van Note C; Defensive linemen (DL): 69 Dan Benish DT; 77 Rick Bryan DT; 73 Gary Burley DT; 75 Roy Harris DT; 72 Andrew Provence DE; 65 Don Smith DE; 79 Jeff Yeates DE	Linebackers (LB): 53 Thomas Benson OLB; 50 Buddy Curry MLB; 58 David Frye OLB; 51 Jeff Jackson OLB; 54 Fulton Kuykendall MLB; 55 Dave Levenick OLB; 52 Rydell Malancon OLB; 56 Al Richardson OLB; 96 Johnny Taylor OLB; Defensive backs (DB): 26 James Britt CB; 23 Bobby Butler CB; 25 Scott Case FS; 34 Blane Gaison SS; 37 Kenny Johnson SS; 27 Tom Pridemore FS; 48 Gerald Small CB; Special teams (ST): 1 Ralph Giacomarro P; 18 Mick Luckhurst K	Reserve: 31 William Andrews RB (IR); 10 Steve Bartkowski QB (IR); 70 Mike Chapman G (IR); 29 Stan Gay CB (IR); 30 Steve Haworth CB (NF-Inj.); 81 Billy Johnson WR (IR); 49 Allama Matthews TE (IR); 40 Eddie Meyers RB (Military); 74 Mike Pitts DE (IR); 59 John Rade LB (IR); 67 Eric Sanders T (IR); 84 Sylvester Stamps WR (IR); 44 Rodney Tate RB (IR); -- Ben Young TE (IR); Rookies in italics

== Regular season ==
=== Schedule ===
Week	Date	Opponent	Result	Record	Venue	Attendance	Recap
1	September 2	at **New Orleans Saints**	**W** 36–28	1–0	Louisiana Superdome	66,652	Recap
2	September 9	Detroit Lions	**L** 24–27 (OT)	1–1	Atlanta–Fulton County Stadium	49,878	Recap
3	September 16	at Minnesota Vikings	**L** 20–27	1–2	Hubert H. Humphrey Metrodome	53,955	Recap
4	September 23	Houston Oilers	**W** 42–10	2–2	Atlanta–Fulton County Stadium	45,248	Recap
5	September 30	at **San Francisco 49ers**	**L** 5–14	2–3	Candlestick Park	57,990	Recap
6	October 7	at **Los Angeles Rams**	**W** 30–28	3–3	Anaheim Stadium	47,832	Recap
7	October 14	New York Giants	**L** 7–19	3–4	Atlanta–Fulton County Stadium	50,268	Recap
8	October 22	**Los Angeles Rams**	**L** 10–24	3–5	Atlanta–Fulton County Stadium	52,681	Recap
9	October 28	at Pittsburgh Steelers	**L** 10–35	3–6	Three Rivers Stadium	55,971	Recap
10	November 5	at Washington Redskins	**L** 14–27	3–7	Robert F. Kennedy Memorial Stadium	51,301	Recap
11	November 11	**New Orleans Saints**	**L** 13–17	3–8	Atlanta–Fulton County Stadium	40,590	Recap
12	November 18	Cleveland Browns	**L** 7–23	3–9	Atlanta–Fulton County Stadium	28,280	Recap
13	November 25	at Cincinnati Bengals	**L** 14–35	3–10	Riverfront Stadium	44,678	Recap
14	December 2	**San Francisco 49ers**	**L** 17–35	3–11	Atlanta–Fulton County Stadium	29,644	Recap
15	December 9	at Tampa Bay Buccaneers	**L** 6–23	3–12	Tampa Stadium	33,808	Recap
16	December 16	Philadelphia Eagles	**W** 26–10	4–12	Atlanta–Fulton County Stadium	15,582	Recap
Note: Intra-division opponents are in **bold** text.

=== Game summaries ===
==== Week 1 ====
Team	1	2	3	4	Total
• Falcons	5	14	7	10	36
Saints	7	14	0	7	28

- Date: September 2
- Location: Louisiana Superdome, New Orleans, Louisiana
- Game start: 12:00 p.m.
- Game weather: Indoors (dome)
- Referee: Gene Barth

Scoring summary
1	ATL	Mick Luckhurst 38 yard field goal	ATL 3–0
1	ATL	Safety, Richard Todd tackled by Rick Bryan in end zone	ATL 5–0
1	NO	George Rogers 3 yard run (Morten Andersen kick)	NO 7–5
2	ATL	Alfred Jackson 50 yard pass from Steve Bartkowski (Mick Luckhurst kick)	ATL 12–7
2	NO	Tyrone Young 18 yard pass from Richard Todd (Morten Andersen kick)	NO 14–12
2	ATL	Gerald Riggs 3 yard run (Mick Luckhurst kick)	ATL 19–14
2	NO	George Rogers 4 yard run (Morten Andersen kick)	NO 21–19
3	ATL	Stacey Bailey 5 yard pass from Steve Bartkowski (Mick Lickhurst kick)	ATL 26–21
4	ATL	Gerald Riggs 1 yard run (Mick Luckhurst kick)	ATL 33–21
4	NO	John Tice 3 yard pass from Richard Todd (Morten Andersen kick)	ATL 33–28
4	ATL	Mick Luckhurst 48 yard field goal	ATL 36–28

=== Week 2: vs. Detroit Lions ===
Quarter	1	2	3	4	OT	Total
**Lions**	10	7	7	0	3	**27**
Falcons	0	10	7	7	0	**24**

at Atlanta–Fulton County Stadium, Atlanta, Georgia

- Date: Sunday, September 9
- Game time: 1:00 p.m.
- Game weather: 70 °F or 21.1 °C, wind 10 miles per hour (16 km/h; 8.7 kn)
- Referee: Fred Silva
- Pro-Football-Reference.com

Game information

**First quarter**

- Lions – Billy Sims 9 yard run (Eddie Murray kick) – **Lions 7–0**
- Lions – Eddie Murray 46 yard field goal – **Lions 10–0**

**Second quarter**

- Lions – David Lewis 11 yard pass from Gary Danielson (Eddie Murray kick) – **Lions 17–0**
- Falcons – Gerald Riggs 1 yard run (Mick Luckhurst kick) – **Lions 17–7**
- Falcons – Mick Luckhurst 51 yard field goal – **Lions 17–10**

**Third quarter**

- Falcons – Billy Johnson 45 yard pass from Steve Bartkowski (Mick Luckhurst kick) – **Tie 17–17**
- Lions – Leonard Thompson 11 yard pass from Gary Danielson (Eddie Murray kick) – **Lions 24–17**

**Fourth quarter**

- Falcons – Stacey Bailey 29 yard pass from Steve Bartkowski (Mick Luckhurst kick) – **Tie 24–24**

**Overtime**

- Lions – Eddie Murray 48 yard field goal – **Lions 27–24**

**Lions**

- Gary Danielson
  21/32, 250 Yds, 2 TD, 2 INT
- Billy Sims
  23 Rush, 140 Yds, TD
- David Lewis
  4 Rec, 68 Yds, TD

**Falcons**

- Steve Bartkowski
  24/28, 299 yds, 2 TD
- Gerald Riggs
  19 Rush, 78 Yds, TD
- Billy Johnson
  8 Rec, 116 Yds, TD

==== Week 3 at Vikings ====
Week Three: Atlanta Falcons (1–1) at Minnesota Vikings (0–2)

Quarter	1	2	3	4	Total
Falcons	3	3	7	7	**20**
**Vikings**	3	3	21	0	**27**

at Hubert H. Humphrey Metrodome, Minneapolis, Minnesota

- Date: September 16
- Game time: 1:00 p.m. EST
- Game weather: Indoors (dome)
- Game attendance: 53,955
- Referee: Fred Wyant
- Box Score, Box Score

Game information

**First quarter**

- ATL – Mick Luckhurst 33-yard field goal, 7:32. Falcons 3–0. Drive:
- MIN – Jan Stenerud 22-yard field goal, 3:39. Tie 3–3. Drive:

**Second quarter**

- MIN – Jan Stenerud 54-yard field goal, 14:29. Vikings 6–3. Drive:
- ATL – Mick Luckhurst 43-yard field goal, 6:04. Tie 6–6. Drive:

**Third quarter**

- MIN – Leo Lewis 42-yard pass from Tommy Kramer (Jan Stenerud kick), 12:10. Vikings 13–6. Drive:
- ATL – Stacey Bailey 57-yard pass from Steve Bartkowski (Mick Luckhurst kick), 9:58. Tie 13–13. Drive:
- MIN – Steve Jordan 21-yard pass from Tommy Kramer (Jan Stenerud kick), 5:50. Vikings 20–13. Drive:
- MIN – Dwight Collins 43-yard pass from Tommy Kramer (Jan Stenerud kick), 1:59. Vikings 27–13. Drive:

**Fourth quarter**

- ATL – Billy Johnson 32-yard pass from Steve Bartkowski (Mick Luckhurst kick), 5:43. Vikings 27–20. Drive:

Top passers

- ATL – Steve Bartkowski – 14/24, 195 yards, 2 TD, INT
- MIN – Tommy Kramer – 15/30, 203 yards, 2 TD

Top rushers

- ATL – Gerald Riggs – 17 rushes, 83 yards
- MIN – Darrin Nelson – 15 rushes, 96 yards

Top receivers

- ATL – Stacey Bailey – 4 receptions, 102 yards, TD
- MIN – Leo Lewis – 3 receptions, 69 yards, TD

==== Week 5 (Sunday, September 30, 1984): at San Francisco 49ers ====
Week 5: Atlanta Falcons at San Francisco 49ers

Quarter	1	2	3	4	Total
Falcons (2–3)	3	0	0	2	**5**
49ers (5–0)	0	14	0	0	**14**

at Candlestick Park • San Francisco, California

- Date: September 30, 1984
- Game time: 4:00 p.m. EDT
- Game weather: 56 °F (13 °C); wind 14
- Game attendance: 57,990
- Referee: Bob McElwee
- TV announcers (CBS): Tom Brookshier (play-by-play) and Wayne Walker (color commentator)
- Pro-Football-Reference.com

Team	Category	Player	Statistics
ATL	Passing	Steve Bartkowski	22/41, 267 YDS, 2 INTs
ATL	Rushing	Gerald Riggs	28 CAR, 136 YDS
ATL	Receiving	Stacey Bailey	4 REC, 97 YDS
SF	Passing	Joe Montana	13/25, 149 YDS, 2 TDs
SF	Rushing	Wendell Tyler	12 CAR, 99 YDS
SF	Receiving	Mike Wilson	3 REC, 47 YDS, 1 TD

Scoring summary

Quarter	Time	Drive			Team	Scoring information	Score	
Quarter	Time	Plays	Yards	TOP	Team	Scoring information	ATL	SF
1	1:29				Falcons	22-yard field goal by Luckhurst	3	0
2	4:07				49ers	Francis 5-yard touchdown reception from Montana, Wersching kick good	3	7
2	0:27				49ers	Wilson 21-yard touchdown reception from Montana, Wersching kick good	3	14
4	1:45	—	—	—	Falcons	Runager tackled in the end zone by Case for a safety	5	14
"TOP" = time of possession. For other American football terms, see Glossary of American football.							5	14

- Point spread: 49ers by 6
- Over/under: 49.5 **(under)**
- Time of game:

Falcons	Game statistics	49ers
22	First downs	17
35–161	Rushes–yards	32–161
267	Passing yards	149
22–41–2	Passes	13–25–0
2–10	Sacked–yards	0–0
257	Net passing yards	149
418	Total yards	310
48	Return yards	62
4–38.8	Punts	5–43.8
3–1	Fumbles–lost	3–2
5–45	Penalties–yards	5–56
34:57	Time of Possession	25:03

=== Week 11 ===
Team	1	2	3	4	Total
• Saints	10	0	0	7	17
Falcons	0	10	3	0	13

- Date: November 11
- Location: Atlanta–Fulton County Stadium
- Referee: Dick Jorgensen

==== Week 14 (Sunday, December 2, 1984): vs. San Francisco 49ers ====
Week 14: San Francisco 49ers at Atlanta Falcons

Quarter	1	2	3	4	Total
49ers (13–1)	7	14	7	7	**35**
Falcons (3–11)	3	7	7	0	**17**

at Atlanta–Fulton County Stadium • Atlanta, Georgia

- Date: December 2, 1984
- Game time: 1:00 p.m. EST
- Game weather: 46 °F (8 °C); wind 9
- Game attendance: 29,644
- Referee: Jim Tunney
- TV announcers (CBS): Tom Brookshier (play-by-play) and Wayne Walker (color commentator)
- Pro-Football-Reference.com

Team	Category	Player	Statistics
SF	Passing	Joe Montana	12/24, 165 YDS, 2 TDs, 2 INTs
SF	Rushing	Wendell Tyler	15 CAR, 69 YDS
SF	Receiving	Earl Cooper	4 REC, 51 YDS
ATL	Passing	Mike Moroski	22/43, 289 YDS, 1 TD, 3 INTs
ATL	Rushing	Gerald Riggs	30 CAR, 133 YDS, 1 TD
ATL	Receiving	Alfred Jackson	11 REC, 193 YDS, 1 TD

Scoring summary

Quarter	Time	Drive			Team	Scoring information	Score	
Quarter	Time	Plays	Yards	TOP	Team	Scoring information	SF	ATL
1	11:38				Falcons	32-yard field goal by Luckhurst	0	3
1	9:49				49ers	Solomon 64-yard touchdown reception from Montana, Wersching kick good	7	3
2	14:50				49ers	Clark 6-yard touchdown reception from Montana, Wersching kick good	14	3
2	3:04				Falcons	Riggs 2-yard touchdown run, Luckhurst kick good	14	10
2	1:21	—	—	—	49ers	Fumble recovery returned 34 yards for touchdown by Johnson, Wersching kick good	21	10
3	7:41				Falcons	Jackson 48-yard touchdown reception from Moroski, Luckhurst kick good	21	17
3	1:31	—	—	—	49ers	Interception returned 54 yards for touchdown by McLemore, Wersching kick good	28	17
4	9:01				49ers	Craig 5-yard touchdown run, Wersching kick good	35	17
"TOP" = time of possession. For other American football terms, see Glossary of American football.							35	17

- Point spread: 49ers by 13
- Over/under: 40.0 **(over)**
- Time of game:

49ers	Game statistics	Falcons
15	First downs	23
31–143	Rushes–yards	36–153
165	Passing yards	289
12–24–2	Passes	22–43–3
2–18	Sacked–yards	3–28
147	Net passing yards	261
290	Total yards	414
224	Return yards	112
5–39.6	Punts	4–40.8
1–1	Fumbles–lost	3–3
9–73	Penalties–yards	8–50
24:33	Time of Possession	35:27

=== Standings ===
NFC West
	W	L	T	PCT	DIV	CONF	PF	PA	STK
^{(1)} San Francisco 49ers	15	1	0	.938	6–0	12–0	475	227	W9
^{(4)} Los Angeles Rams	10	6	0	.625	3–3	7–5	346	316	L1
New Orleans Saints	7	9	0	.438	1–5	4–8	298	361	W1
Atlanta Falcons	4	12	0	.250	2–4	3–9	281	382	W1

== Awards and records ==
- Gerald Riggs, Franchise Record, Most Rushing Yards in One Game, 202 Yards (September 2, 1984)
