= Demetrius Brown =

American football player (born c.1967)

No. 6
- Position: Quarterback

Personal information
- Born: c. 1967; Miami, Florida, U.S.
- Listed height: 6 ft 1 in (1.85 m)
- Listed weight: 190 lb (86 kg)

Career information
- High school: Miami Beach (Miami Beach, Florida)
- College: Michigan (1985–1989)

Demetrius Brown (born c. 1967) is an American former football player. He was a quarterback for the University of Michigan Wolverines football team from 1985 to 1989 and a starting quarterback for the 1987 and 1988 teams. Brown was the first Michigan quarterback to lead the Wolverines to bowl victories in consecutive seasons, with victories over Alabama in the 1988 Hall of Fame Bowl and USC in the 1989 Rose Bowl. During the 1987 season, Brown also set Michigan school records with seven interceptions in a game and 16 interceptions in a season.

== Early life ==
Brown grew up in the Overtown section of Miami, Florida. His parents were divorced when he was young, and he was raised by his mother. He attended Miami Beach Senior High School. Prior to Brown's freshman year, the school's starting quarterback was killed. He became a four-year starter at quarterback for Miami Beach High.

== University of Michigan ==
Brown enrolled at the University of Michigan in 1985. Brown did not see any game action in 1985 or 1986 when Jim Harbaugh was Michigan's starting quarterback.

=== 1987 season ===
Following a preseason battle with Chris Zurbrugg and Michael Taylor to take over as Michigan's starting quarterback after Harbaugh's graduation, Brown became Michigan's starting quarterback in 1987. In his fifth start, a 17–11 loss to Michigan State, Brown drew the ire of Michigan fans when he threw a school record seven interceptions.

One week after the Michigan State game, Brown threw a career best three touchdown passes, all in the first half, with no interceptions, and compiled 190 passing yards, against an Iowa team with the No. 1 pass defense team in the country. He also ran for a touchdown to lead Michigan to a 37–10 victory over Iowa.

Brown played through the 1987 season with a broken thumb on his left hand (his throwing hand), sustained on October 24 against Indiana, and a badly dislocated thumb on his right hand, sustained two weeks later against Minnesota. In November 1987, Michigan head coach Bo Schembechler said of Brown:

"I don't know if you like him or not, but that is one tough kid. And I don't know if he likes me all the time, because I yell at him. But I like him."

Brown and running back Jamie Morris led Michigan to a 28–24 victory over Alabama in the 1988 Hall of Fame Bowl. Morris ran for three touchdowns, and Brown then threw a game-winning, 20-yard touchdown pass to John Kolesar with less than a minute remaining in the game.

The 1987 Michigan team led by Brown compiled an 8–4 record and outscored opponents 331 to 172. Brown had 1,355 yards of total offense during the 1987 season, 1,251 passing yards and 104 net rushing yards. He was also intercepted a school record 16 times in 1987.

=== 1988 season ===
At the beginning of the 1988 season, Brown faced eligibility issues due to academic deficiencies. Michael Taylor won the starting quarterback spot, but Brown resumed the starting role after Taylor sustained a broken collarbone. After setting a school record with 16 interceptions in 1987, Brown turned matters around in 1988, allowing zero interceptions in 84 passing attempts. For the season, Brown completed 48 of 84 passes for 775 yards and six touchdowns. Brown led the 1988 team to a Big Ten Conference championship with five consecutive wins at the end of the regular season.

In the 1988 Michigan–Ohio State game, Brown completed 11 of 17 passes for a career-high 223 passing yards. He also threw touchdown passes of 57 yard to Greg McMurtry and 41 yards to John Kolesar. Brown's performance helped Michigan defeat Ohio State, 34–31, to win the Big Ten football championship and a berth in the Rose Bowl.

Brown's final game for Michigan was the 1989 Rose Bowl. Prior to the game, USC defensive back Tracy Butts predicted that the Trojans would intercept four passes off Brown. Instead, Brown completed 11 of 24 passes for 144 yards, including a touchdown pass to Chris Calloway and no interceptions, as Michigan defeated USC, 22–14. After the game, Brown told reporters: "I'd like to talk to Tracy Butts."

=== Career statistics ===
During his career at Michigan, Brown completed 128 of 252 passes for 2,026 yards, 17 touchdowns, and 16 interceptions. He also gained 122 net rushing yards and scored five rushing touchdowns on 89 carries.
