= 1984 Philadelphia Eagles season =

NFL team season

- Owner: Leonard Tose
- Head coach: Marion Campbell
- Home stadium: Veterans Stadium

Results
- Record: 6–9–1
- Division place: 5th NFC East
- Playoffs: Did not qualify

The 1984 Philadelphia Eagles season was their 52nd in the National Football League (NFL). The team improved upon their previous output of 5–11, winning six games. Despite the improvement, the team failed to qualify for the playoffs for the third straight season.

Whatever outside chance the Birds had to make the playoffs was sunk on November 25 at St. Louis, when starting quarterback Ron Jaworski suffered a broken leg and missed the remainder of the season. It was the most serious injury the "Polish Rifle" ever suffered in his long career. Joe Pisarcik took over under center for the final three-plus games.

This would be the final season for the Eagles under the ownership of Leonard Tose; as following rumors that the team might end up moving to Phoenix, Tose would eventually sell the team in 1985 to Norman Braman.

== Offseason ==
=== NFL draft ===
The 1984 NFL draft was held May 1–2, 1984. It was 12 rounds held over two days and televised by ESPN. A month later, a draft was held for college seniors who already signed with either the CFL or USFL prior to the May 1984 draft. While the Eagles finished the 1983 NFL season with a record of 5–11 and in fourth place in the NFC East Division they would always get the 4th pick in the 12 rounds of the draft. Only the Tampa Bay Buccaneers, Houston Oilers at 2–12 and the New York Giants at 3–13 would have a worse record. It would be one of the most power balanced years.

1984 Philadelphia Eagles draft
Round	Pick	Player	Position	College	Notes
1	4	Kenny Jackson	WR	Penn State	
3	60	Rusty Russell	T	South Carolina	
4	88	Evan Cooper	DB	Michigan	
5	116	Andre Hardy	RB	St. Mary's (CA)	
6	144	Scott Raridon	T	Nebraska	
7	172	Joe Hayes	RB	Central State (OK)	
8	200	Manny Matsakis	K	Capital	
10	256	John Thomas	DB	TCU	
11	284	John Robertson	T	East Carolina	
12	312	Paul McFadden	K	Youngstown State	
Made roster † Pro Football Hall of Fame * Made at least one Pro Bowl during career

=== NFL supplemental draft ===
This draft was held on June 5, 1984. These were players that were not drafted by an NFL team. In an attempt to head off a bidding war in its own ranks for USFL and CFL players. NFL teams chose 84 players from 224 available during the three-round selection meeting. Many of the big name USFL players were ineligible for the draft because their rights were already owned by NFL clubs. Still 3 of the first 4 players selected would become NFL Hall Of Famers. These players signed with the USFL before the NFL could draft them. Some teams took a chance and drafted players still so they had their NFL rights, The Dallas Cowboys of the National Football League, suspecting that the USFL was not going to last, acquired Walker's NFL rights by drafting him in the fifth round of the 1985 NFL Draft.

Round	Pick	Player	Position	School	USFL / CFL Team
1	4	Reggie White	Defensive end	University of Tennessee	Memphis Showboats
2	32	Daryl Goodlow	Linebacker	Arizona	Oklahoma Outlaws
3	60	Thomas Carter	Linebacker	San Diego State	Oakland Invaders

== Personnel ==
=== Staff / Coaches ===
1984 Philadelphia Eagles staff
Front office: Owner – Leonard Tose; Director of Football Operations – Harry Gamble; Director of player personnel – Lynn Stiles; Head coaches: Head coach – Marion Campbell; Assistant head coach – Fred Bruney; Offensive coaches: Offensive coordinator – Ted Marchibroda; Running Backs – Billie Matthews; Receivers – Tom Coughlin; Tight Ends – Frank Gansz; Offensive Line – Ken Iman	Defensive coaches: Defensive coordinator – Marion Campbell; Defensive Line – Chuck Clausen; Linebackers – George Hill; Defensive Backs – Fred Bruney; Special teams coaches: Special Teams – Frank Gansz

=== Roster ===
1984 Philadelphia Eagles roster
Quarterbacks (QB): 11 Jeff Christensen; 5 Dean May; 9 Joe Pisarcik; Running backs (RB): 39 Major Everett; 35 Michael Haddix; 47 Andre Hardy; 31 Wilbert Montgomery; 34 Hubie Oliver; 32 Michael Williams; Wide receivers (WR): 86 Gregg Garrity; 85 Melvin Hoover; 81 Kenny Jackson; 82 Mike Quick; 83 Tony Woodruff; Tight ends (TE): 84 Vyto Kab; 87 Lawrence Sampleton; 88 John Spagnola	Offensive linemen (OL): 63 Ron Baker G; 65 Mark Dennard C; 67 Gerry Feehery C/G; 73 Steve Kenney G; 64 Dean Miraldi T; 74 Leonard Mitchell T; 72 Dave Pacella G/C; 62 Petey Perot G; 79 Rusty Russell T; Defensive linemen (DL): 96 Harvey Armstrong NT; 98 Greg Brown DE; 71 Ken Clarke NT; 94 Byron Darby DE; 68 Dennis Harrison DE; 93 Thomas Strauthers DE	Linebackers (LB): 58 Anthony Griggs ILB; 52 Rich Kraynak OLB; 55 Mike Reichenbach ILB; 56 Jerry Robinson ILB; 53 Jody Schulz OLB; 51 Reggie Wilkes OLB; 58 Joel Williams OLB; Defensive backs (DB): 46 Herm Edwards CB; 21 Evan Cooper CB/S; 24 Ray Ellis SS; 29 Elbert Foules CB; 48 Wes Hopkins FS; 20 Andre Waters CB; 22 Brenard Wilson CB/FS; 43 Roynell Young CB; Special teams (ST): 2 Mike Horan P; 8 Paul McFadden K	Reserve: 57 Bill Cowher LB (IR); 97 Leon Evans DE (IR); 80 Joe Hayes WR (IR); 7 Ron Jaworski QB (IR); 77 Tom Jelesky T (IR); 61 Scott Raridon T/G (Left squad); 76 Jerry Sisemore T (IR); 69 Sam Slater T (IR); Rookies in italics

== Preseason ==
Week	Date	Opponent	Result	Record	Venue	Attendance
1	August 4	at Detroit Lions	L 14–17	0–1	Pontiac Silverdome	46,055
2	August 11	at Pittsburgh Steelers	L 17–20 (OT)	0–2	Three Rivers Stadium	46,696
3	August 18	at Minnesota Vikings	W 31–10	1–2	Hubert H. Humphrey Metrodome	51,743
4	August 23	Cleveland Browns	W 20–19	2–2	Veterans Stadium	40,030

== Schedule ==
Week	Date	Opponent	Result	Record	Venue	Attendance	Recap
1	September 2	at **New York Giants**	**L** 27–28	0–1	Giants Stadium	71,520	Recap
2	September 9	Minnesota Vikings	**W** 19–17	1–1	Veterans Stadium	55,942	Recap
3	September 16	at **Dallas Cowboys**	**L** 17–23	1–2	Texas Stadium	64,521	Recap
4	September 23	San Francisco 49ers	**L** 9–21	1–3	Veterans Stadium	62,771	Recap
5	September 30	at **Washington Redskins**	**L** 0–20	1–4	RFK Stadium	53,064	Recap
6	October 7	at Buffalo Bills	**W** 27–17	2–4	Rich Stadium	37,555	Recap
7	October 14	Indianapolis Colts	**W** 16–7	3–4	Veterans Stadium	50,277	Recap
8	October 21	**New York Giants**	**W** 24–10	4–4	Veterans Stadium	64,677	Recap
9	October 28	**St. Louis Cardinals**	**L** 14–34	4–5	Veterans Stadium	54,310	Recap
10	November 4	at Detroit Lions	**T** 23–23 (OT)	4–5–1	Pontiac Silverdome	59,141	Recap
11	November 11	at Miami Dolphins	**L** 23–24	4–6–1	Miami Orange Bowl	70,227	Recap
12	November 18	**Washington Redskins**	**W** 16–10	5–6–1	Veterans Stadium	63,117	Recap
13	November 25	at **St. Louis Cardinals**	**L** 16–17	5–7–1	Busch Memorial Stadium	39,858	Recap
14	December 2	**Dallas Cowboys**	**L** 10–26	5–8–1	Veterans Stadium	66,322	Recap
15	December 9	New England Patriots	**W** 27–17	6–8–1	Veterans Stadium	41,581	Recap
16	December 16	at Atlanta Falcons	**L** 10–26	6–9–1	Atlanta–Fulton County Stadium	15,582	Recap
Note: Intra-division opponents are in **bold** text.

=== Standings ===
NFC East
	W	L	T	PCT	DIV	CONF	PF	PA	STK
^{(2)} Washington Redskins	11	5	0	.688	5–3	8–4	426	310	W4
^{(5)} New York Giants	9	7	0	.563	5–3	7–7	299	301	L2
St. Louis Cardinals	9	7	0	.563	5–3	6–6	423	345	L1
Dallas Cowboys	9	7	0	.563	3–5	7–5	308	308	L2
Philadelphia Eagles	6	9	1	.406	2–6	3–8–1	278	320	L1

=== Game summaries ===
==== Week 4 (Sunday, September 23, 1984): vs. San Francisco 49ers ====
Week 4: San Francisco 49ers at Philadelphia Eagles

Quarter	1	2	3	4	Total
49ers (4–0)	7	7	0	7	**21**
Eagles (1–3)	0	6	3	0	**9**

at Veterans Stadium • Philadelphia, Pennsylvania

- Date: September 23, 1984
- Game time: 1:00 p.m. EDT
- Game weather: 68 °F (20 °C); wind 9
- Game attendance: 62,771
- Referee: Ben Dreith
- TV announcers (CBS): Tom Brookshier (play-by-play) and Wayne Walker (color commentator)
- ; Pro-Football-Reference.com

Team	Category	Player	Statistics
SF	Passing	Matt Cavanaugh	17/34, 252 YDS, 3 TDs
SF	Rushing	Wendell Tyler	21 CAR, 113 YDS
SF	Receiving	Dwight Clark	3 REC, 84 YDS, 1 TD
PHI	Passing	Ron Jaworski	16/40, 187 YDS, 1 INT
PHI	Rushing	Wilbert Montgomery	12 CAR, 51 YDS
PHI	Receiving	Wilbert Montgomery	7 REC, 46 YDS

Scoring summary

Quarter	Time	Drive			Team	Scoring information	Score	
Quarter	Time	Plays	Yards	TOP	Team	Scoring information	SF	PHI
1	1:30				49ers	Craig 35-yard touchdown reception from Cavanaugh, Wersching kick good	7	0
2	11:52				Eagles	35-yard field goal by McFadden	7	3
2	0:55				Eagles	32-yard field goal by McFadden	7	6
2	0:12				49ers	Solomon 2-yard touchdown reception from Cavanaugh, Wersching kick good	14	6
3	6:13				Eagles	43-yard field goal by McFadden	14	9
4	10:10				49ers	Clark 51-yard touchdown reception from Cavanaugh, Wersching kick good	21	9
"TOP" = time of possession. For other American football terms, see Glossary of American football.							21	9

- Point spread: 49ers by 4 1/2
- Over/under: 44.0 **(under)**
- Time of game:

49ers	Game statistics	Eagles
23	First downs	15
37–177	Rushes–yards	20–72
252	Passing yards	187
17–34–0	Passes	16–41–1
4–31	Sacked–yards	2–18
221	Net passing yards	169
398	Total yards	241
173	Return yards	51
7–39.1	Punts	7–40.0
2–0	Fumbles–lost	0–0
12–141	Penalties–yards	4–30
34:31	Time of Possession	25:29

== Awards and honors ==
- Mike Quick, 1984 Pro Bowl selection
- Paul McFadden, All-Rookie Team, Second team All-NFC, UPI Rookie of the Year
