= Larry Morris (running back) =

American football player (born 1962)

No. 43
- Position: Running back

Personal information
- Born: February 27, 1962 (age 64); Fort Bragg, North Carolina, U.S.
- Listed height: 5 ft 7 in (1.70 m)
- Listed weight: 207 lb (94 kg)

Career information
- High school: Ayer (MA)
- College: Syracuse
- NFL draft: 1985: undrafted

Career history
- Green Bay Packers (1987)

Career NFL statistics
- Rushing attempts: 8
- Rushing yards: 18
- Stats at Pro Football Reference

Calvin Larry Morris (born February 27, 1962) is an American former professional football player who was a running back in the National Football League (NFL). Morris was born in Fort Bragg, North Carolina, on February 27, 1962. He is the brother of Joe Morris, who played eight seasons in the NFL and Jamie Morris, who played three seasons in the NFL. Morris graduated from Ayer High School before playing college football for the Syracuse Orange.

After playing professional football in Italy, Morris signed on as a replacement player for the Green Bay Packers during the 1987 NFL season. The signing was controversial within the Morris family, with Larry's brother Joe being one of the NFL players on strike. He played in two games for the Packers, recording 8 rushes for 18 yards. After his football career, he went into pharmaceuticals and coached youth football. He was married and had two children.
