= Michael Taylor (American football) =

American football player (born c. 1968)

No. 9 – Michigan Wolverines
- Position: Quarterback

Personal information
- Born: c. 1968
- Listed height: 6 ft 0 in (1.83 m)
- Listed weight: 202 lb (92 kg)

Career information
- High school: Princeton (Sharonville, Ohio)
- College: Michigan (1986–1989)

Awards and highlights
- Second-team All-Big Ten (1989)

Michael A. Taylor (born c. 1968) is an American former college football player. He played at the quarterback position for the University of Michigan from 1986 to 1989, the final four years of Bo Schembechler's tenure as the school's head football coach. He was Michigan's starting quarterback in 1988 and 1989 and led the Wolverines to Big Ten Conference championships both years. He finished his career at Michigan as the school's all-time leader in passing efficiency.

== Early life ==
Taylor was raised by his mother and grandmother in Lincoln Heights, Ohio. Taylor credited them for instilling his desire to win: "They gave me my sense of values and drive to excel. I have to do everything as well as I can to let them know how much I love and appreciate them for heading me in the right direction." Taylor attended Princeton High School in Sharonville, Ohio where he led them to a Div I state championship in 1983.

== University of Michigan ==
=== 1986 season ===
Taylor enrolled at the University of Michigan in 1985. As a redshirt freshman in 1986, Taylor appeared briefly in 4 games, rushing for 33 yards on 5 carries and scoring a touchdown against Illinois.

=== 1987 season ===
As a sophomore in 1987, Taylor appeared in seven games for Michigan, including two games as the starting quarterback. Taylor threw his first touchdown pass for Michigan in a backup role against Wisconsin. He got his first start after junior quarterback Demetrius Brown broke the thumb on his throwing hand in the Indiana game. Prior to Brown's thumb injury, Taylor had completed only 9 of 21 pass attempts for 133 yards, 2 interceptions and 1 touchdown. At the time, Michigan head coach Bo Schembechler expressed confidence in Taylor, telling the press: "Michael Taylor is a fine quarterback. He's smart. He's a good quarterback. If we have to play Taylor, we'll be all right."

Taylor got the start at quarterback against Northwestern, but Schembechler kept to a running game due to the inexperience of his quarterback. Michigan rushed 50 times in the game for 374 yards and passed only 5 times, the fewest pass attempts by a Michigan team since 1977. Despite the emphasis on the running game, Taylor proved to be the star of the game, as he rushed for 144 yards, averaged 10.3 yards per carry, and scored 2 touchdowns. Taylor had a 65-yard touchdown run and had runs of 31 yards in the second quarter and 39 yards in the third quarter set up field goals by Mike Gillette.

Despite the solid performance against Northwestern, Taylor pulled a leg muscle in the game, and Demetrius Brown recovered sufficiently to resume his role as the starting quarterback for the remaining four games of the 1987 season. Taylor also got the starting assignment in Michigan's 28–24 victory over Alabama in the 1988 Hall of Fame Bowl, completing 2 of 4 pass attempts and rushing for 11 yards.

=== 1988 season ===
At the start of the 1988 season, Michigan faced a quarterback controversy. Demetrius Brown had been declared academically ineligible earlier in the year, but regained his eligibility before the season started. Taylor had missed spring practice due to a hamstring pull, leaving Coach Schembechler worried about the quarterback position. At the time, Taylor was considered the team's best option offense quarterback, but he had completed only 41% of his passes in 1987.

Shortly before the season opener against Notre Dame, Schembechler announced that Taylor would be his starting quarterback. Schembechler noted that Taylor "has thrown well, has run well, knows the offense and is getting us into the right plays." Taylor ended up starting 9 of 12 games for the 1988 Michigan football team that finished the season with a 9–2–1 record (7–0–1 in the Big Ten), won the Big Ten Conference championship and defeated USC in the 1989 Rose Bowl. Taylor completed 76 of 122 pass attempts for a 62.3% completion percentage and was intercepted only twice.

In the season opener against Notre Dame, Schembechler kept the ball on the ground, with 52 running plays and only 11 pass attempts. Michigan lost a close game 19–17, as Taylor completed 8 of 11 pass attempts for 74 yards and scored one of Michigan's two rushing touchdowns.

Taylor had his best game of the 1988 season in a 31–30 loss to the No. 1 ranked Miami Hurricanes on September 17, 1988. Taylor nearly led the Wolverines to an upset win to break Miami's 33-game regular season winning streak, but the defense gave up 17 points in the final 5 minutes and 24 seconds to allow Miami to come from behind to win the game. Taylor did his part, completing 16 of 24 pass attempts for 214 yards and three touchdowns. The Washington Post praised Michigan's passing game:

"Employing a combination of its usual righteous conservatism with a startlingly effective passing game, the Wolverines incited an overflow crowd of 105,834 in the broad, intimidating sweep of Michigan Stadium by outright dominating the Hurricanes, the defending national champions, for most of four quarters. A mulish, persistent quarterback named Michael Taylor threw scoring passes of five, 18 and 16 yards, the latter to take a 30–14 lead with 10:32 left."

The Associated Press also praised Taylor's performance: "Miami's comeback overcame a brilliant performance by Michigan quarterback Michael Taylor, who was shaken up twice but returned to throw three touchdown passes."

After losing the first two games of the season, the Wolverines were 9–0–1 in the final ten games. One sports writer praised Taylor's performance in the first 8 games as follows: "Taylor has been everything Brown wasn't. He has a better understanding of the offense, is more poised, reads defenses better, and runs better. He was intercepted just twice in 122 passes this season."

After playing well in the first eight games of the season, Taylor broke his collarbone on the first offensive play in the Minnesota game and had to undergo surgery two days later. He was unable to play in the final regular season games against Illinois and Ohio State and in the 1989 Rose Bowl game against USC.

Taylor was the Big Ten's passing efficiency leader for the 1988 season.

=== 1989 season ===
As a senior, Taylor started 8 of 12 games for the 1989 Michigan football team that finished the season with a 10–2 record (8–0 in the Big Ten), won the Big Ten Conference championship and lost to USC in the 1990 Rose Bowl. Taylor completed 74 of 121 pass attempts for 1,081 yards and 11 touchdowns in 1989.

In the weeks before the season opener, the press focused on Taylor's physical condition. He had been nursing a sore shoulder in his throwing arm two weeks before the opener and missed the first week of practice. Coach Schembechler called it "the great Michael Taylor scare," and with news that Taylor would play, the Associated Press reported, "The Michael Taylor scare is over." Taylor noted, "I can throw freely and it doesn't hurt. I'm close to 100 percent and never even thought of not playing." Assistant coach Gary Moeller explained that Taylor's injury problem had been caused by the fact that "he didn't know how to throw properly until he came to Michigan." Taylor had been "flinging the ball with his arm," Moeller noted, instead of using his whole body and sometimes reverted to that habit. Despite the pain, Taylor vowed to give it his best effort against Notre Dame, saying, "I was raised to play football only one way, and that's giving 110 percent."

Michigan and Notre Dame entered the season opener as the no. 1 and no. 2 ranked teams in college football. Taylor started the game against Notre Dame and completed 5 of 6 passes, including a touchdown, but he left the game after injuring his back. Taylor was replaced with freshman Elvis Grbac in the Notre Dame game.

After the loss of Taylor, Schembechler questioned his decision to let the injured Taylor play: "I suppose if I had to do it all over again, I probably should have started Elvis and let the chips fall where they may. To be honest with you, Taylor didn't throw a pass all week. He's got a bad arm right now. But he's a great competitor. He wanted to go. He felt he'd be able to throw the ball all right." Schembechler added, "Michael Taylor is a fifth-year quarterback. He's the leader of our team. Hell's afire, we send him out there with a bad arm. If Michael's healthy, you'll see a difference."

Taylor was unable to play in the following four games against UCLA, Maryland, Wisconsin, and Michigan State. Grbac performed well as Taylor's replacement, leading to speculation that he might retain the starting job even after Taylor recovered.

Coach Schembechler denied there was any controversy, and Taylor returned to the line-up in the fifth game against Iowa Taylor was impressive in his return, completing 11 of 15 pass attempts, including 2 touchdown passes, and also scored a rushing touchdown as the Wolverines beat the Hawkeyes 26–12. After the game, Taylor said, "I think I did all right. I took what the defense gave me."

The following week, Taylor again performed well, completing 11 of 18 pass attempts against Indiana and threw touchdown passes of 18 yards to Greg McMurtry and 43 yards to Derrick Alexander. As Michigan continued to win under Taylor, Schembechler noted, "We've been more productive on offense since Michael came back, because he's so dangerous on the option play. I don't have any problem with Grbac at quarterback, but we're a better team when Taylor's in there. He's a fifth-year senior who makes few mistakes. We were counting on him in spring practice, gearing the season toward him."

Taylor had the best game of his career in a 49–15 victory over Minnesota on November 18. Taylor completed 12 of 16 pass attempts for 231 yards. He also tied a Michigan record with four touchdown passes, including three touchdown passes to Greg McMurtry of 49, 34 and 25 yards.

In the final game at Michigan Stadium for Taylor as a player and for Schembechler as head coach, Taylor led the Wolverines to a 28–18 victory over Ohio State. Taylor played the entire game and ran for 57 yards on 8 carries for an average of 7.1 yards per carry. He was also 8 for 16 passing, completed a 5-yard touchdown pass to Jarrod Bunch. Taylor also had 2 turnovers in game, fumbling the ball at Ohio State's 22-yard line and throwing an interception on the second play of the second half.

=== 1990 Rose Bowl ===
The Wolverines won the Big Ten championship and advanced to the Rose Bowl. As the starting quarterback in the Rose Bowl, Taylor was the subject of extensive pre-game publicity.

In a pre-game profile of Taylor published by USA Today, Michigan offensive coordinator Gary Moeller said, "He's kind of a Joe Kapp, throw-it-end-over-end guy. He's not a great physical thrower. We all know that." At the same time, Moeller praises Taylor's instincts and intelligence: "He's good because he goes back there and finds the right receiver to throw to and gets it there." On hearing about Moeller's comments, Taylor said, "I never saw Joe Kapp, but what I know is that I just go out and play, and I don't listen to the critics. I know I can move this team."

As the game approached, media attention focused on reports that Taylor's right shoulder was sore. Taylor said, "A lot of people question my health and my arm, but I just put that out of my mind. I don't really care what people say. I'm just going to go out and do my job."

In the Rose Bowl, Taylor was held to 10 of 19 passing for 115 yards. In post-game coverage, reporters credited USC's coaches for letting loose the "full complement of defensive linemen and pass-rushing linebackers at Michigan quarterback Michael Taylor during the final series," with the result that "Taylor ended the Rose Bowl on his back, the victim of a sack."

=== Career totals ===
In his three years as a quarterback at Michigan (1987–1989), Taylor completed 163 of 275 pass attempts for 2,194 yards and had 17 touchdown passes, 7 interceptions, and a career completion percentage of 59.3%. At conclusion of his career at Michigan, he ranked first all-time among Michigan quarterbacks in passing efficiency, and his 59.3% completion percentage ranked second all-time, trailing only Jim Harbaugh.
