= List of Central Oklahoma Bronchos in the NFL draft =

This is a list of Central Oklahoma Bronchos who were selected in the NFL draft. The University of Central Oklahoma (UCO) has had 18 players selected in the National Football League (NFL) draft since the league began holding drafts in 1936. This includes two players selected in the third round. The San Francisco 49ers, Detroit Lions and the St.Louis/Phoenix Cardinals have drafted two Bronchos.

Each NFL franchise seeks to add new players through the annual NFL draft. The draft rules were last updated in 2009. The team with the worst record from the previous year picks first, the next-worst team second, and so on. Teams that did not make the playoffs are ordered by their regular-season record with any remaining ties broken by strength of schedule. Playoff participants are sequenced after non-playoff teams, based on their round of elimination (wild card, division, conference, and Super Bowl).

== Key ==
B	Back	K	Kicker	NT	Nose tackle
C	Center	LB	Linebacker	BB	Blocking back
DB	Defensive back	P	Punter	HB	Halfback
DE	Defensive end	QB	Quarterback	WR	Wide receiver
DT	Defensive tackle	RB	Running back	G	Guard
E	End	OT	Offensive tackle	TE	Tight end
FB	Fullback				
*	Selected to a Pro Bowl				
†	Won an NFL championship				
‡	Selected to a Pro Bowl and won an NFL championship				

== Players selected ==
Year	Round	Pick	Player	Team	Position	Notes
1956	16	183	Lionel Reed	RB	Pittsburgh Steelers	—
1961	12	169	Raymond Hayes	RB	Minnesota Vikings	—
1961	15	205	Bob Sams	T	San Francisco 49ers	—
1961	20	276	Jerry Perry	T	San Francisco 49ers	—
1965	10	133	R. L. Briggs	FB	Washington Redskins	—
1966	11	163	Bobby Williams	DB	St. Louis Cardinals	—
1967	14	362	Vernon Moore	HB	Buffalo Bills	—
1971	16	402	Jack O'Donnel	G	Green Bay Packers	—
1973	4	96	James Hooks	RB	Detroit Lions	—
1974	10	247	David Wooley	RB	Detroit Lions	—
1980	11	299	Terry Jones	DE	Tampa Bay Buccaneers	—
1981	4	85	Clifford Chatman	RB	New York Giants	—
1984	7	172	Joe Hayes	RB	Philadelphia Eagles	—
1984	11	289	Steve McKeaver	RB	Cincinnati Bengals	—
1988	9	240	Neil Gailbraith	DB	New England Patriots	—
1991	3	61	Keith Traylor	LB	Denver Broncos	Super Bowl champion (XXXII, XXXIII, XXXIX)
1992	7	175	Derek Ware	TE	Phoenix Cardinals	—
1995	3	86	Joe Aska	RB	Oakland Raiders	—
