= Venice High School (Los Angeles) =

Public high school in California, United States

Venice Senior High School
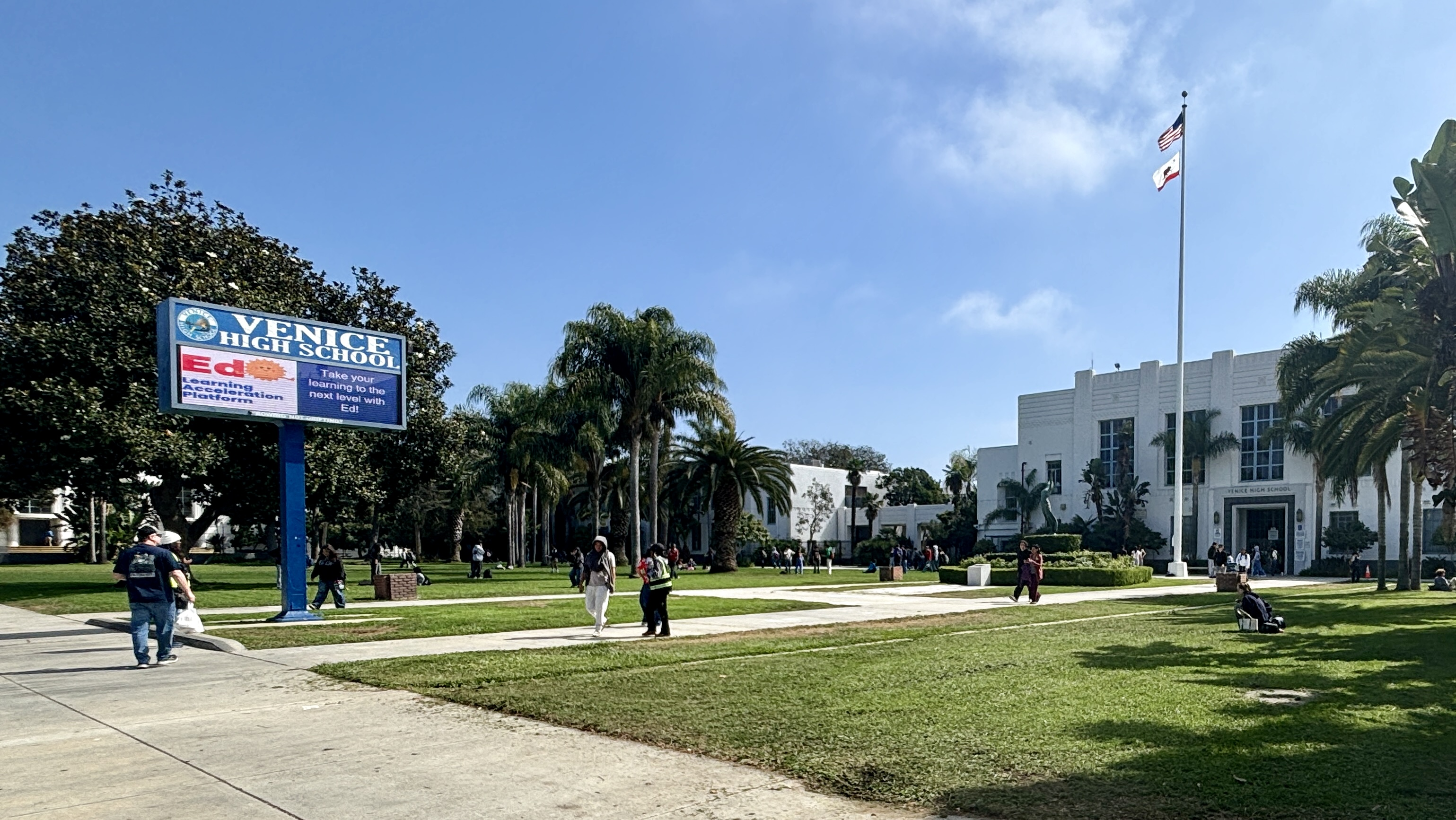
- Venice High School, 2024

Location
- 13000 Venice Boulevard; Venice, Los Angeles, California 90066; United States; 33°59′55″N 118°26′34″W

Information
- Type: Public high school, Language Magnet, STEMM Magnet
- Motto: Rowing, Not Drifting
- Established: 1911 (LACHSD 1925, LAUSD 1961), (Magnet 1988)
- Locale: City, Large
- NCES District ID: 0622710
- CEEB code: 051828
- NCES School ID: 062271003429
- Principal: Yavonka Hairston Truitt
- Teaching staff: 107.85 (on an FTE basis)
- Grades: 9–12
- Enrollment: 2,293 (2024–25)
  - Male: 1,152
  - Female: 1,141
- Student to teacher ratio: 21.26
- Color: Blue White
- Athletics conference: CIF Los Angeles City Section; Western League
- Mascot: Gunther Gondolier
- Nickname: Gondoliers
- Publication: Written Voice
- Newspaper: The Oarsman
- Yearbook: Gondolier
- Website: venicehs.lausd.org

Venice High School (VHS) is a public school located in the Mar Vista neighborhood of Los Angeles, California and within the Local District West area of the Los Angeles Unified School District (LAUSD). As of the 2024–25 school year, VHS served 2,293 students, and had a student-teacher ratio of 21.26.

== History ==
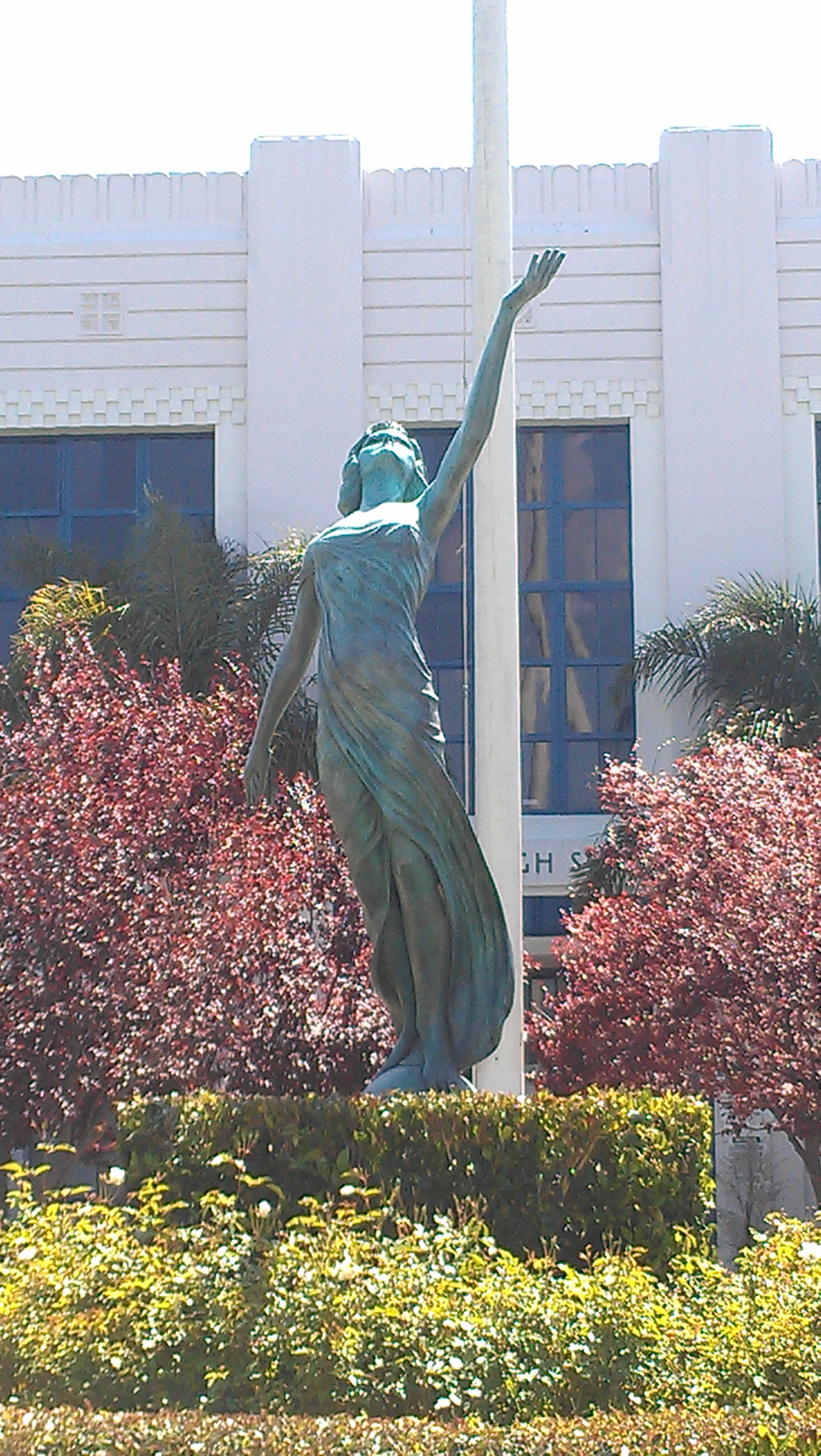
Replica of Inspiration (model, Myrna Loy) in front of Venice High School

The school was established in 1911 (then called "Venice Union Polytechnic High School") when classes were held in an old lagoon bathhouse two blocks from the beach. It moved to a new neo-romanesque structure at its present 29-acre campus two miles inland a decade later which was bought for $72,500 at that time.

A famous statue, installed in 1922 and for which then-unknown Venice High School student Myrna Loy served as model, stood on the front lawn of Venice High School for over 70 years. An unsightly cage was erected to prevent vandalism, but the statue was ultimately removed and sent to indoor storage in 1998. However, a bronze-cast replacement statue was mounted before 2,000 cheering onlookers in an April 2010 ceremony.

On March 10, 1933, the school was seriously damaged by the 1933 Long Beach earthquake. As a result, classes were held in hastily constructed tents for two years until a replacement school was built. Art Deco earthquake-resistant buildings were built in 1935, and are still used by the school today.

It was in the Los Angeles City High School District until 1961, when it merged into LAUSD.

Beginning in fall 2007, some neighborhoods zoned to Hamilton High School were rezoned to Venice High School.

On May 15, 2009, students staged a walkout in response to LAUSD increasing class sizes and cutting teachers. Students who engaged in the walkout received support from the ACLU and the National Lawyers Guild in clearing their truancies on that particular day. A similar walkout occurred in 1951 when school administration disqualified a candidate for student body office because of a questionable campaign speech. Administration retaliated by focusing on agitators within the heretofore self-selective service clubs, suspending the clubs and then reorganizing them later with a more pliant membership. Small protests (e.g. graffiti, lawn burnings, tree fellings) continued sporadically for a year.

== Walkouts During the Trump Administration ==
The first walk out for support of Immigrants was held in February 2025 which other schools participated in and 200 students supported the walk out at that time, the walkout was against ICE raids in the area and the rest of the country. The newspaper The Oarsman covered this.

The second walkout happened on November 5th and this was reported on by social media and ABC7 News and in this walkout, about the same amount (200) students participated in the walkout.

== Support ==
Venice High is greatly supported by numerous community partnerships, parent groups, Booster, and Alumni associations. Venice is known for offering many Advanced Placement classes and having an excellent athletics program.

== AP Classes ==
=== English ===
AP Capstone (Lists AP Seminar and Research)

AP English Literature and Composition

AP English Language and Composition

=== Art ===
AP Art History

AP Art and Design

AP Music Theory

=== History and Social Studies ===
AP African American Studies

AP Human Geography

AP United States Government and Politics

AP World History: Modern

AP United States History

=== Math and Computer Sciences ===
AP Calculus

AP Computer Science A

AP Computer Science Principles

AP Precalculus

AP Statistics

=== Sciences ===
AP Biology

AP Chemistry

AP Physics

AP Environmental Science

=== Languages and culture ===
AP Spanish Language and Culture

AP Spanish Literature and Culture

AP Chinese Language and Culture

== Demographics ==
During the 2011–2012 school year, 69% of Venice High students were Hispanic/Latino, with 12% white/European Americans, 10% African Americans and 8% Asian Americans.

Demographics during the 2025-2026 School Year at Venice High:

Hispanic:55.6%

White:18.3%

Black:12.2%

Asian:7.3%

2 or more Races:6.3%

Native Hawaiian or Pacific Islander:0.1%

== Academics and academic performance ==
VHS has four Small Learning Communities (SLCs):

- Academy of Law and Public Service
- Media, Arts & Technology Academy
- School for Advanced Studies (SAS) and GATE
- Sports Medicine

VHS also has two magnet programs:

- World Language and Global Studies Magnet
- STEMM (Science Technology Engineering Mathematics and Medicine) Magnet

As of 1998, the school has mathematics and science programs and a magnet program that explores international politics. Additionally, as of 2017, the World Languages and Global Studies Magnet offers courses in Mandarin Chinese, Japanese, Italian, French and Spanish.

Venice High School won back-to-back National Science Bowl championships in 1996 and 1997, and won regional championships in 1993, 1994 and 2005. Venice High School is one of only three schools that have won two National Science Bowl championships.

In 1998 Richard Lovett, the president of the Creative Artists Agency (CAA), gave self-esteem courses to the students, and Terry Hardy of Los Angeles Magazine wrote that the CAA "has adopted Venice High as its very own."

== School's student news site ==
The school's student news site, called The Oarsman, began as a school newspaper. Written Voice, a literary journal started in the spring of 2012, features students' poetry, short stories, and other work. An unofficial News magazine, The Venice Independent, was formerly run by Venice students.

== Athletics ==
Venice High School fields a variety of sports teams that compete in the Western League of the CIF Los Angeles City Section.

Eight graduates have appeared in Major League Baseball and NFL games in the last 20 years.

== Filming location ==
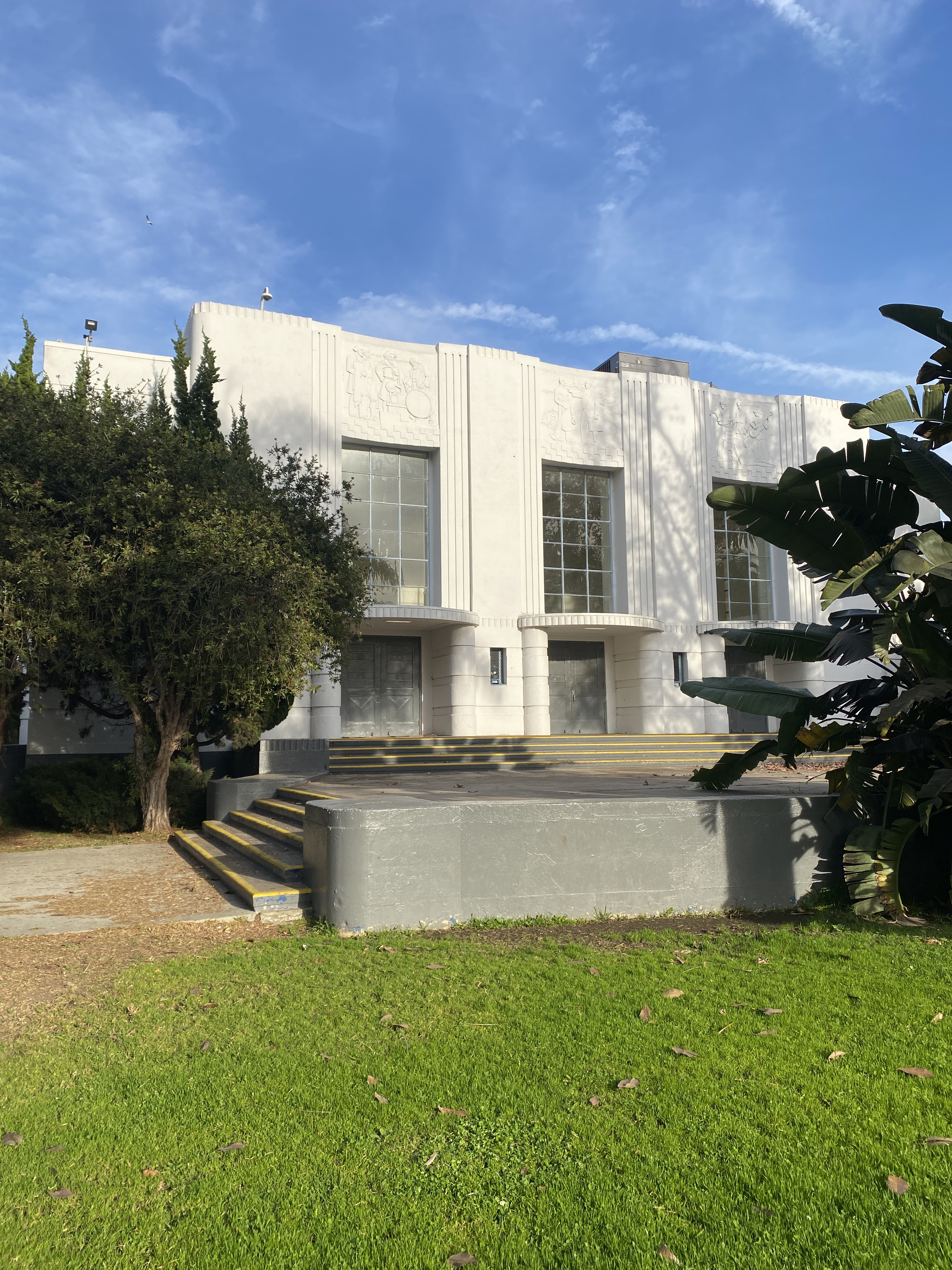
Venice High School auditorium building

Venice High School was used as the Rydell High School location for the 1978 movie Grease—in which the opening shot was the Myrna Loy statue. The school was also used in other movies such as A Nightmare on Elm Street, American History X, Matchstick Men, and Heathers, as well as in several music videos, including Britney Spears' international hit "...Baby One More Time", Bowling for Soup's "High School Never Ends", Cher Lloyd's "Oath", and Young MC's "Principal's Office". Venice is also in The Faders' "No Sleep Tonight". Additionally, aerial photographic images of the school were used to show the location of the high school in the 1987 movie Masters of the Universe. The campus was also used for the TV show Glee on an episode ("Yes/No", aired January 17, 2012) which recreates the classic "Summer Nights" scene from Grease, as made famous by John Travolta and Olivia Newton-John (and filmed on the same location). The Australian TV series Rake also used Venice High School as a filming location. The music video for Alesso's 2014 song "Cool" was also shot here.

== Neighborhoods zoned to Venice ==
Several neighborhoods, including Venice, Marina del Rey, Mar Vista, and Del Rey, feed into Venice High School. The unique educational pathways offered by the six small schools draw students from across Los Angeles. Three University of California Los Angeles (UCLA) student housing facilities for families are zoned to Venice High School. They include Rose Avenue Apartments, University Village, and Venice-Barry Apartments. Rose Avenue had been rezoned from Hamilton High School to Venice in 2007.

According to both the City of Los Angeles's Venice Community Plan map and LAUSD's Venice High School Modernization Plan, the school is located in Venice. However, according to the Los Angeles Times Mapping L.A. project, it is in the adjacent neighborhood of Mar Vista.

== Nearby elementary and middle schools ==
Elementary schools in the Venice High district include Beethoven Elementary, Mar Vista Elementary, Playa del Rey Elementary, Broadway Elementary, Braddock Drive Elementary, Grand View Boulevard School, Stoner Avenue Elementary, Short Avenue Elementary, Walgrove Avenue Elementary, Westminster Avenue Elementary School and Coeur d'Alene Avenue Elementary School. Marina Del Rey Middle School, Daniel Webster Middle School, Mark Twain Middle School, and Palms Middle School feed into Venice. Until LAUSD established sufficient capacity in the area during the immediate post-World War II period, Culver City-based Betsy Ross Elementary, now closed, had been the largest single feeder to the then 7–12th grade high school.

== Notable alumni ==
- Larry Atkins, NFL linebacker, Kansas City, Oakland 1999–2004
- David Blu, led Israeli team to 2004 Euroleague basketball championship
- Cliff Bourland, 1948 Summer Olympics 4X400 gold medal; US 400m champion
- Craig Breedlove, land-speed world record holder
- Beau Bridges, film actor
- John Bromfield, actor, television star
- Les Clark, legendary Disney animator and one of Disney's Nine Old Men
- Leon Clarke, NFL end 1956–63, twice in Pro Bowl
- John Clayton, jazz and classical double bassist
- Gary Collins, actor and TV personality
- Walter Cunningham, NASA astronaut, (Apollo 7 pilot)
- Marceline Day, actress
- Karen Fukuhara, actress
- Crispin Glover, actor
- Gogi Grant (Myrtle Audrey Arinsberg), singer
- Skip Guinn, Major League Baseball pitcher
- Irene Hervey, actress
- Shin Hye-sung, South Korean singer and lead vocalist of six-member boy band Shinhwa
- Donna Loren, singer and actress; "Dr Pepper girl"
- J. P. Losman, NFL quarterback, Buffalo, Oakland 2004–09, Miami 2011
- Myrna Loy, (Myrna Williams), film actress, voted "Queen of Hollywood" in 1938
- Teena Marie (Mary Christine Brockert), singer, songwriter, producer
- Dana McLemore, NFL defensive back, New Orleans, San Francisco, 1982–87
- Betty Miller first female pilot to fly solo across the Pacific Ocean
- Fred Miller, (1931–2017), NFL offensive tackle, Washington, 1955
- Jonas Mouton, NFL linebacker, San Diego, 2011–2014
- Andrea Murez (born 1992), Israeli-American Olympic swimmer
- Morris Nettles, former Major League Baseball player
- Atsuko Okatsuka, stand-up comedian and actress
- Steven Okazaki, filmmaker
- Peggy Oki, surfer, skateboarder, artist, environmental activist
- Stacy Peralta, skateboarder, surfer, documentary film director
- Don Perry, 6-time AAU and NCAA champion in gymnastic rope climb, world record holder
- Doug Slaten (1980–2016), MLB pitcher for the Washington Nationals
- Harry Snyder, founder of In-N-Out hamburger chain
- Joanie Sommers (Joan Drost), singer, "Pepsi Girl"
- Larry Stevenson, skateboard pioneer, designer
- Esther Takei Nishio, selected as a "test case" as the first World War II internee of Japanese descent to return from camp and enroll in a California university
- Brycen Tremayne, NFL wide receiver for the Washington Commanders
- Jerry Turner, MLB player from 1974–83 for the San Diego Padres, Detroit Tigers, and Chicago White Sox

- Paul Wolf, swimming competitor who competed in the 1936 Berlin Olympics, and won a silver medal participating in the 4x200-meter freestyle relay.

== Hall of Fame ==
The Venice High School Hall of Fame was introduced by the Venice High School Alumni Association in 2017. The inaugural inductees were Beau Bridges (class of 1959), John Clayton (1969), Walter Cunningham (1950), Robby Duron (faculty), Skip Engblom, (1967), Bill Fairbanks (faculty), Artie Harris (faculty), Donna Loren (1963), Myrna Loy (1921; posthumous), Abbot Kinney (posthumous), Dana McLemore (1978), Ken Medlock (1967), Audrey O'Brien Griffin (1954), Peggy Oki (1973), Billy E. Paney (faculty), George Rose (faculty), Jeffery Shimizu (faculty), Harry Snyder (1932; posthumous), Tony Vazquez (1973), Clifford L. Warner (1980), and Sam Whipple (1978).
