= Joe Morris (American football) =

American football player (born 1960)

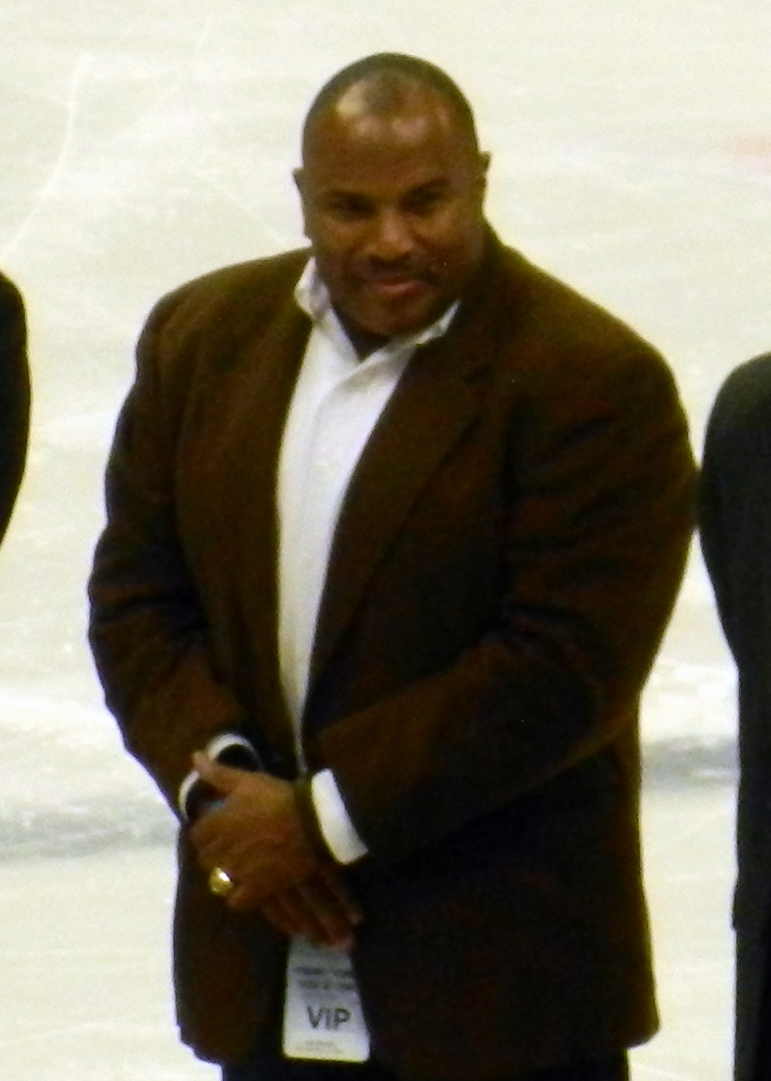
- Morris in 2014

No. 20, 47
- Position: Running back

Personal information
- Born: September 15, 1960 (age 66); Fort Bragg, North Carolina, U.S.
- Listed height: 5 ft 7 in (1.70 m)
- Listed weight: 190 lb (86 kg)

Career information
- High school: Ayer (Ayer, Massachusetts)
- College: Syracuse (1978–1981)
- NFL draft: 1982: 2nd round, 45th overall pick

Career history
- New York Giants (1982–1989); Cleveland Browns (1991)

Awards and highlights
- Super Bowl champion (XXI); First-team All-Pro (1986); 2× Pro Bowl (1985, 1986); NFL rushing touchdowns leader (1985); New York Giants Ring of Honor; 38th greatest New York Giant of all-time; First-team All-East (1979); Second-team All-East (1981); Syracuse Orange No. 47 retired

Career NFL statistics
- Rushing yards: 5,585
- Rushing average: 4
- Rushing touchdowns: 50
- Stats at Pro Football Reference

Joseph Edward Morris (born September 15, 1960) is an American former professional football player who was a running back in the National Football League (NFL) for the New York Giants from 1982 to 1988. Initially noted for his diminutive stature — 5' 7", Morris was a key member of the Giants team that won Super Bowl XXI in 1987. He rushed for 67 yards, caught four passes for 20 yards, and scored a touchdown in the game.

== College career ==
While playing scholastic sports at Ayer High School in Ayer, Massachusetts, Morris was an All-State in two sports. Morris was a four-year starter at Syracuse University in upstate New York. At Syracuse, Morris set all of the all-time rushing records rushing for 4,229 yards in his four seasons surpassing former greats such as Jim Brown, Larry Csonka and Floyd Little. An All-American choice by his senior year, he was selected to play in the Blue–Gray, East–West Shrine and Senior Bowl games before signing on with the New York Giants. Morris was also co-captain with Ike Bogosian, father of NHL player Zach Bogosian.

== Professional career ==
Morris was the New York Giants' second round pick in the 1982 NFL draft, and quickly outshined their first round pick, University of Michigan back Butch Woolfolk. As a rookie with the Giants in 1982, Morris scored a touchdown on his very first rushing attempt; a prelude of what was to come for the powerful running back. In 1985, he rushed for 1,336 yards and a league leading 21 touchdowns, and rushed for 141 yards in their 17–3 postseason win over the San Francisco 49ers. Morris was a key member of the '86 Giants Super Bowl championship team rushing his way to a 1,000 yard season. He went on to add two more 1,000 plus yard rushing seasons, moving past Alex Webster as the all-time Giants leader.

In the Giants' march to the Lombardi Trophy, Morris rushed for 313 yards in three playoff games including a 159-yard, two touchdown performance against the San Francisco 49ers. He was selected to the Pro Bowl in '85 and '86 seasons and also received All-NFL Honors for his performance those two years. Towards the end of the 1988 season, he totaled 1,318 attempts, 5,296 yards and 48 touchdowns for the New York Giants. He didn't play the 1989 season because of a broken foot that he suffered in September on the first quarter of the last preseason game. He was put on injured reserve and spent his time working daily at his commercial printing company in Fair Lawn, New Jersey. He sat out the 1990 season. With the Cleveland Browns in 1991, he ran for 289 yards. He was waived by the Browns in September 1992 before the season started. He finished his NFL career with 5,585 rushing yards, 111 receptions for 960 yards, and 52 touchdowns.

=== New York Giants franchise records ===
As of 2017's NFL off-season, Joe Morris held at least 19 Giants franchise records, most related to his prolific post-season career with the club. These records include:

- Most Rush Attempts (playoff career): 140
- Most Rush Attempts (playoff season): 73 (1986)
- Most Rush Yards (playoff career): 553
- Most Rush Yards (playoff season): 313 (1986)
- Most Rush Yds/Att (playoff game): 6.63 (1987–01–04 SFO)
- Most Rushing TDs (season): 21 (1985)
- Most Rushing TDs (playoff career): 4 (Tied with Brandon Jacobs)
- Most Rushing TDs (playoff season): 4 (1986)
- Most Rushing TDs (playoff game): 2 (1987–01–04 SFO; tied with Rodney Hampton)
- Most Rush Yds/Game (playoff career): 79
- Most Total TDs (season): 21 (1985)
- Most Total TDs (playoff season): 4 (1986; tied with Brandon Jacobs and Hakeem Nicks)
- Most 100+ yard rushing games (season): 9 (1986; tied with Tiki Barber)
- Most 100+ yard rushing games (playoffs): 2 (NA; tied with Ottis Anderson and Tiki Barber)
- Most Games with 1+ TD scored (season): 13 (1986; tied with Ottis Anderson)
- Most Games with 2+ TD scored (career): 15 (Tied with Brandon Jacobs)
- Most Games with 2+ TD scored (season): 7 (1985)
- Most Games with 3+ TD scored (career): 6
- Most Games with 3+ TD scored (season): 4 (1985)

== NFL career statistics ==
Legend
	Super Bowl champion
	Led the league
**Bold**	Career high

Year	Team	Games		Rushing						Receiving					Fumbles	
Year	Team	GP	GS	Att	Yds	Avg	Y/G	Lng	TD	Rec	Yds	Avg	Lng	TD	Fum	FR
1982	NYG	5	0	15	48	3.2	9.6	7	1	8	34	4.3	13	0	1	1
1983	NYG	15	0	35	145	4.1	9.7	16	0	2	1	0.5	6	**1**	2	1
1984	NYG	16	8	133	510	3.8	31.9	28	4	12	124	10.3	**26**	0	1	0
1985	NYG	16	16	294	1,336	**4.5**	83.5	**65**	**21**	**22**	212	9.6	17	0	6	**2**
1986	NYG	15	15	**341**	**1,516**	4.4	**101.1**	54	14	21	**233**	**11.1**	23	**1**	6	**2**
1987	NYG	11	10	193	658	3.4	59.8	34	3	11	114	10.4	25	0	2	0
1988	NYG	16	15	307	1,083	3.5	67.7	27	5	**22**	166	7.5	24	0	**7**	1
1991	CLE	16	4	93	289	3.1	18.1	15	2	13	76	5.8	13	0	2	1
Career		110	68	1,411	5,585	4.0	50.8	65	50	111	960	8.6	26	2	27	8

== After football ==
Morris now works in real estate and insurance. He resides in New Jersey with his two children. He was also a part owner of the New Jersey Red Dogs of the Arena Football League, along with fellow ex-Giants Carl Banks and Harry Carson.

== Family ==
Morris had two younger brothers follow him to Syracuse University. Mike was a wide receiver and Larry was a running back. Morris' youngest brother, Jamie Morris set the all-time rushing records at the University of Michigan.

== See also ==
- History of the New York Giants (1979–1993)
