= Fred Miller (gridiron football, born 1931) =

American football player (1931–2017)

No. 70
- Position: Offensive tackle

Personal information
- Born: August 10, 1931; San Francisco, California, U.S.
- Died: October 22, 2017 (aged 86); Nahalem, Oregon, U.S.
- Listed height: 6 ft 3 in (1.91 m)
- Listed weight: 220 lb (100 kg)

Career information
- High school: Venice (CA)
- College: Pacific

Career history
- Washington Redskins (1955); Hamilton Tiger-Cats (1956); BC Lions (1957)

Career statistics
- Games played: 12
- Stats at Pro Football Reference

Frederick Louis Miller (August 10, 1931 – October 22, 2017) was an American professional football offensive tackle who played in the National Football League for the Washington Redskins, and in the Canadian Football League for the Hamilton Tiger-Cats and BC Lions. He lettered in college football, track, tennis and rugby at the University of the Pacific in 1953. After graduating from the University of the Pacific, he was commissioned as an officer in the United States Navy and served from 1954 to 1955, with duty aboard a Landing Ship, Tank (LST) in Korea. He received advanced education degrees from the University of Southern California in 1959 and Indiana University in 1963. Miller was the athletic director at California State College, Long Beach from 1967 to 1971, Arizona State University from 1971 to 1980, and San Diego State University from 1985 to 1995.
