= Alfred Jackson (wide receiver, born 1955) =

American football player (born 1955)

No. 85
- Position: Wide receiver

Personal information
- Born: August 3, 1955 (age 71); Cameron, Texas, U.S.
- Listed height: 5 ft 11 in (1.80 m)
- Listed weight: 176 lb (80 kg)

Career information
- High school: Caldwell (TX)
- College: Texas
- NFL draft: 1978: 7th round, 167th overall pick

Career history
- Atlanta Falcons (1978–1984)

Awards and highlights
- Second-team All-SWC (1977)

Career NFL statistics
- Receptions: 187
- Receiving yards: 3,001
- Receiving touchdowns: 21
- Stats at Pro Football Reference

Alfred Jackson (born August 3, 1955), is an American former professional football player who was a wide receiver for seven seasons with the Atlanta Falcons of the National Football League (NFL) from 1978 to 1984. He played college football for the Texas Longhorns.

== NFL career statistics ==
Legend
**Bold**	Career high

=== Regular season ===
Year	Team	Games		Receiving				
Year	Team	GP	GS	Rec	Yds	Avg	Lng	TD
1978	ATL	15	0	26	526	**20.2**	**71**	2
1979	ATL	12	0	11	156	14.2	23	0
1980	ATL	**16**	0	22	403	18.3	54	**7**
1981	ATL	**16**	0	37	604	16.3	49	6
1982	ATL	9	9	26	361	13.9	40	1
1983	ATL	4	4	13	220	16.9	54	3
1984	ATL	**16**	**15**	**52**	**731**	14.1	50	2
		88	28	187	3,001	16.0	71	21

=== Playoffs ===
Year	Team	Games		Receiving				
Year	Team	GP	GS	Rec	Yds	Avg	Lng	TD
1978	ATL	**2**	0	1	4	4.0	4	0
1980	ATL	1	0	**1**	**12**	**12.0**	**12**	0
1982	ATL	1	**1**	1	5	5.0	5	0
		4	1	3	21	7.0	12	0
