= Andre Hardy Jr. =

American football player (born 1987)

No. 88
- Position: Tight end

Personal information
- Born: March 18, 1987 (age 39); San Diego, California, U.S.
- Listed height: 6 ft 6 in (1.98 m)
- Listed weight: 245 lb (111 kg)

Career information
- High school: San Diego (CA) St. Augustine
- College: Cal State Fullerton
- NFL draft: 2012: undrafted

Career history
- Oakland Raiders (2012)*; Arizona Cardinals (2014)*; Brooklyn Bolts (2015)
- * Offseason or practice squad member only
- Stats at Pro Football Reference

Andre Elton Hardy Jr. (born March 18, 1987) is an American former football tight end.

== Early life and college basketball career ==
Hardy was born in San Diego. His father, Andre Hardy, was a running back who played in the NFL from 1984 to 1987. Hardy played basketball at St. Augustine High School in San Diego. While an all-state and all-county player, Hardy did not earn GPA and SAT scores high enough for NCAA eligibility. Thus, his family decided to have Hardy miss one credit for graduation from St. Augustine and transfer to the New Hampton School. Although Hardy committed to the University of San Francisco while at New Hampton, the university ultimately did not admit Hardy, so Hardy enrolled at Oral Roberts University the summer after graduating from New Hampton in 2007.

With the Oral Roberts Golden Eagles, Hardy averaged 4.1 points and 3.6 rebounds as a freshman in 2007–08. That season, Oral Roberts won the Summit League tournament and an automatic berth to the NCAA tournament. Hardy then averaged and 7.5 points and 5.5 rebounds as a sophomore in 2008–09.

He then transferred to Cal State Fullerton and sat out the 2009–10 season per NCAA transfer rules. Hardy missed the first 12 games of the season due to ankle surgery but led the team in rebounding with 8.5 per game, in addition to averaging 10.6 points per game. Hardy was elected Big West Newcomer of the Year by conference coaches. As a senior, Hardy averaged 4.9 points and 4.5 rebounds; he left the team in January 2012 for personal reasons.

== NFL career ==
Hardy signed with the Oakland Raiders as an undrafted free agent on April 12, 2012 and was released on May 14, 2012.

On January 7, 2014, Hardy signed with the Arizona Cardinals on a futures contract. During the preseason, Hardy made 2 receptions for 24 yards. He was placed on the practice squad on August 31. On December 30, Hardy was placed on the practice squad injured reserve after a calf injury.
