= Mike Landrum =

American football player (born 1961)

No. 80
- Position: Tight end

Personal information
- Born: November 6, 1961 (age 65); Laurel, Mississippi, U.S.
- Listed height: 6 ft 2 in (1.88 m)
- Listed weight: 231 lb (105 kg)

Career information
- High school: Columbia (MS)
- College: Southern Miss
- NFL draft: 1984: undrafted

Career history
- Atlanta Falcons (1984)

Career NFL statistics
- Receptions: 6
- Receiving yards: 66
- Stats at Pro Football Reference

Mike Landrum (born November 6, 1961) is an American former professional football player who was a tight end for the Atlanta Falcons of the National Football League (NFL) in 1984. He played college football for the Southern Miss Golden Eagles.
