= Kenny Daniel =

American football player (born 1960)

No. 24, 23
- Position: Defensive back

Personal information
- Born: June 1, 1960 (age 66); Martinez, California
- Listed height: 5 ft 10 in (1.78 m)
- Listed weight: 180 lb (82 kg)

Career information
- High school: Richmond (CA)
- College: San Jose State

Career history
- Oakland Invaders (1983–1984); New York Giants (1984); Indianapolis Colts (1986–1987)
- Stats at Pro Football Reference

Kenny Daniel (born June 1, 1960) is an American former football defensive back. He played for the New York Giants in 1984 and for the Indianapolis Colts from 1986 to 1987.
