= Jamie Morris =

American gridiron football player (born 1965)

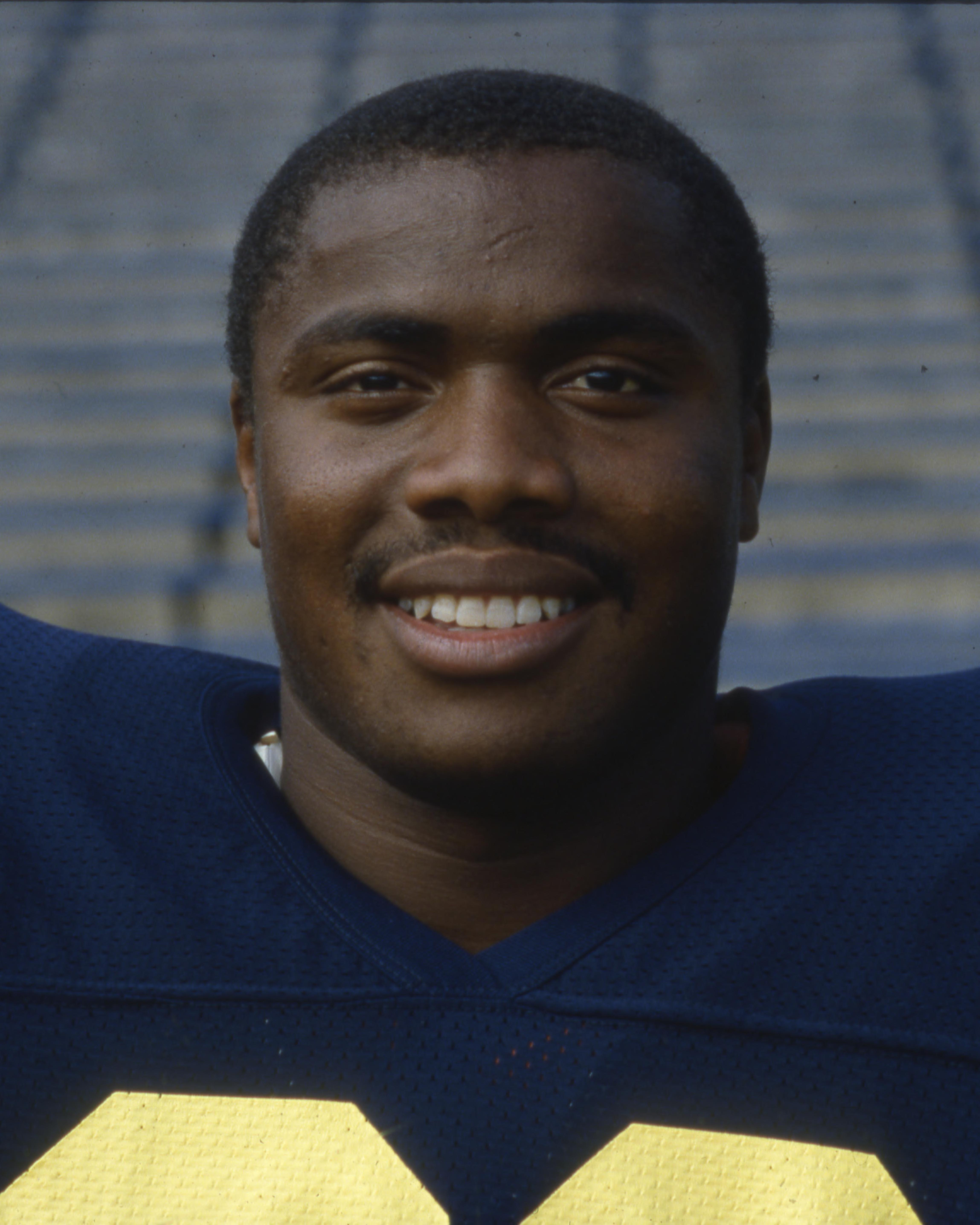
- Morris in 1987

No. 22, 24
- Position: Running back

Personal information
- Born: June 6, 1965 (age 61); Southern Pines, North Carolina, U.S.
- Listed height: 5 ft 7 in (1.70 m)
- Listed weight: 188 lb (85 kg)

Career information
- High school: Ayer (Ayer, Massachusetts)
- College: Michigan (1984–1987)
- NFL draft: 1988: 4th round, 109th overall pick

Career history
- Washington Redskins (1988–1989); New England Patriots (1990); Minnesota Vikings (1991)*; Hamilton Tiger-Cats (1991)
- * Offseason or practice squad member only

Awards and highlights
- Big Ten rushing champion (1987); 2× First Team All-Big Ten (1986–1987); Fiesta Bowl Co-MVP (1986); Hall of Fame Bowl MVP (1988); NFL records: Rushing attempts in a single game: 45

Career NFL statistics
- Rushing yards: 777
- Rushing average: 3.1
- Rushing touchdowns: 4
- Stats at Pro Football Reference

James Walter Morris (born June 6, 1965) is an American former professional football player. He was a running back in the National Football League (NFL) and Canadian Football League (CFL). He played in the NFL for the Washington Redskins and New England Patriots and for the CFL's Hamilton Tiger-Cats.

Morris was a record-setting running back in college football for the Michigan Wolverines. While attending the University of Michigan, he broke the school's all-time records for rushing yards in a season and in a career and for all-purpose yards in a career. His career rushing total was once third in Big Ten Conference history. He continues to hold the career receptions record for Michigan running backs. He also still holds the all-time NFL record for most rushing attempts in a game with 45.

== Early life ==
Morris was born on June 6, 1965 in Southern Pines, North Carolina. His family resided in North Carolina during his father's military service, after which, Jamie and his family moved to Ayer, Massachusetts. Morris attended Ayer High School, where he excelled in track and field in high school, winning the Massachusetts state title in the 200m as a sophomore.

Morris is the younger brother of Joe Morris who set the all-time rushing record at Syracuse University and went on to play for the New York Giants. His brother Larry also played for the Green Bay Packers as a replacement player during the 1987 NFL Players Strike. Another brother, Mike, played wide receiver for Syracuse. Their father, Earl Morris, a former Green Beret master sergeant in Vietnam, was a postmaster in Groton, Massachusetts.

== College career ==
=== Michigan's all-time leader in all-purpose yards ===
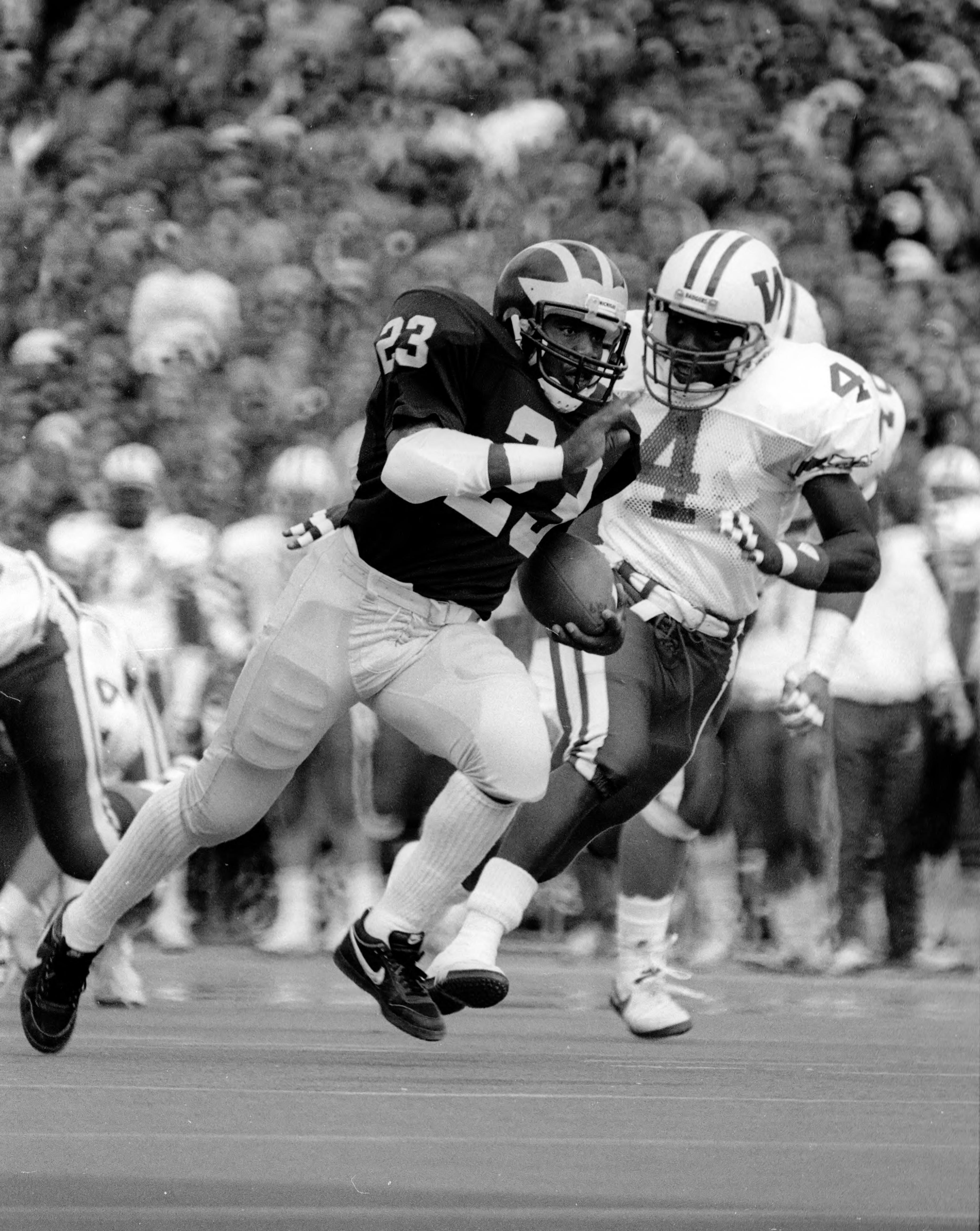
Morris in playing for the Michigan Wolverines in 1987

Morris played college football at the University of Michigan from 1984 to 1987 and broke the school's all-time rushing records in yards gained in a season (1,703 yards) and a career (4,392 yards). Though those records were broken 13 years later by Anthony Thomas, Morris still holds the U-M school record for all-purpose yards with 6,201. Morris was also the only player in Michigan history to lead the Wolverines in rushing for four years until Mike Hart did so from 2004–2007. In addition to his rushing yards, he had 99 receptions for 756 yards and 51 kickoff returns for 1,027 yards. He ranks fourth in U-M history in kickoff return yards. He also still ranks third in U-M history in rushing yards in a season and career. Morris was setting Michigan records during the same years Lorenzo White, the Big Ten's first 2,000-yard rusher, was totaling 4,887 yards for the Michigan State Spartans. Neither reached Archie Griffin's 5,589 yard total. Morris was a very versatile running back who was the first Michigan back to total over 30 receptions in a season and remains the only back to have done so twice. He continues to hold the career receptions record for running backs with 99.

In 1986, Morris suffered a knee injury in a game against Florida State. He sat out a game and then came back to play against Ohio State. While he recuperated Thomas Wilcher rushed for 74 yards and two touchdowns against Wisconsin. When Morris returned, he had the best game of his college career against the Buckeyes, gaining 210 yards rushing (302 all-purpose yards) to help the Wolverines win the game and advance to the Rose Bowl. The Wolverines lost the 1987 Rose Bowl to Arizona State 22–15.

Morris also holds the record for the longest run in Outback Bowl history—a 77-yard touchdown run on January 2, 1988, in a 28–24 victory over Alabama. Morris was named MVP of the game, then known as the Hall of Fame Bowl.

=== Morris' Top 10 game performances at Michigan ===
Morris' Top 10 game performances for the Wolverines are as follows:

Rank	Opponent	Date	Rushing Yds.	Recvg. Yds.	Kick Rtn. Yds.	All-Purp. Yds.	TDs	Score
1	Ohio State	1986-11-22	210	22	70	302	2	26-24
2	Alabama	1988-01-02	234	-4	0	230	3	28-24
3	Indiana	1985-10-26	179	24	26	229	2	42-15
4	Wisconsin	1987-10-03	182	25	0	207	3	49-0
5	Oregon State	1986-09-20	140	35	29	204	0	31-12
6	Minnesota	1987-11-07	149	5	42	196	1	30-20
7	Nebraska	1986-01-01	156	10	29	195	0	27-23
8	Minnesota	1986-11-15	78	64	51	193	0	17-20
9	Indiana	1987-10-24	152	12	27	191	0	10-14
10	Long Beach State	1987-09-26	171	0	0	171	1	49-0

=== Relationship with Schembechler ===
Morris played at Michigan under head coach Bo Schembechler. When Morris first arrived at Michigan, Schembechler told Morris (who stood five feet, seven inches) he was too short to play at running back. Schembechler recalled: "I told Jamie when we recruited him he was too small to be a running back and we wanted him for running back kicks. I did, however, promise him the chance to try to be a running back for us. Good thing I did, isn't it?" In his third game as a freshman, Schembechler put him in as the starting tailback, and he remained Michigan's starter at the position for four years.

When asked years later about Morris' career at Michigan, Schembechler said: "Here's a kid who I thought would be a very fine kick-return specialist, and he ended up becoming the all-time leading ground-gainer in Michigan history. What do you know about that?"

In a November 2007 interview with The Ann Arbor News, Morris recalled: "Once Coach Bo was chastising me, and (assistant coach Lloyd Carr) pointed out, 'Look at those younger players over there. He's not yelling at them, so he must think something about you.' And that held with me for a long time."

Morris also spoke at the memorial service held at Michigan Stadium after Schembechler's death in November 2006. While the majority of the speeches focused on how Schembechler will be remembered, Morris spoke about the things he will miss in his coach's absence. "I will miss having the conversations with him about the good old days," he said. "Most importantly, I will miss hearing how much love and pride he had for Michigan - the school, the players and the fans."

== Professional career ==
Morris set Michigan's all-time rushing records, yet his smaller stature (5 feet, 7 inches) led to a fourth round draft pick during the 1988 NFL draft by the Washington Redskins. He played three seasons from 1988-1990. His best year was 1988 when he played in all 16 games for the Redskins, and rushed for 437 yards in 126 attempts. During his career, Morris twice rushed for at least 100 yards in a game. Morris also set the NFL record for the most rushing attempts in a game with 45, in a December 17, 1988 game against the Cincinnati Bengals. The Redskins' web site describes Morris' record-setting performance as follows: "On the morning of Dec. 17, the Redskins had a 7-8 record coming into the season finale at Cincinnati. ... With no hope of returning to the playoffs, the Redskins gave Morris what amounted to an audition for the starting job in 1989. With only 81 carries and 285 yards for the season, the 5-7, 195-pound running back was ready for the challenge. Not only did he carry the ball a record number of times, he gained 152 yards, didn't fumble, and had the Redskins on the brink of victory in a game in which not many experts gave them a chance." Despite the good showing, Morris did not win a starting job in 1989, gaining 336 yards in 124 carries for a 2.7 yard average. Morris' NFL career came to an end in 1990, when he gained only four yards in two carries for the Redskins.

During Morris' NFL career, none of his teams made the playoffs, but the 1989 Redskins under Joe Gibbs were 10–6. In 1988, Gibbs used a triumvirate of running backs with Kelvin Bryant gaining 498 yards, Timmy Smith gaining 470 yards and Morris gaining 437 yards. That season Morris was the leading Redskin kickoff returner with 21 returns for 413 yards. With the New England Patriots in 1990 Morris was one of five return men (Sammy Martin, Marvin Allen, Junior Robinson, and Don Overton) with at least 10 returns for the team.

Morris played one final season of professional football with the Hamilton Tiger-Cats of the Canadian Football League in 1991. Morris ran for 591 yards and caught 28 passes for 263 yards in 12 regular season games. He also returned kicks for 435 yards and scored three touchdowns on a team that struggled to a 1–13 start and finished in last place at 3–15.

== Career highlights ==
=== Awards and honors ===
- Big Ten rushing champion (1987)
- 2× First Team All-Big Ten (1986), (1987)
- Fiesta Bowl Co-MVP (1986)
- Hall of Fame Bowl MVP (1988)

=== Records ===
==== NFL records ====
- Rushing attempts in a single game: 45

Michigan Wolverines records

- Career all-purpose yards: 6,201
- 100+ yard games in a season: 10 (1987)
- Career receptions by a RB: 99

== Life after football ==
Morris worked for the University of Michigan Athletic Department as a Development Manager from 1998 to 2010. He was responsible for donor relations and facilitating the campaign to raise $100 million by 2008. In 2005, Morris hosted the U-M Football Bust put on by the U-M Club of Greater Detroit. He IS also The host of the talk show called the M Zone, heard weekdays at 3pm on Sports Talk 1050 WTKA in Ann Arbor.

== See also ==
- Michigan Wolverines football statistical leaders
