= Ayer Shirley Regional High School =

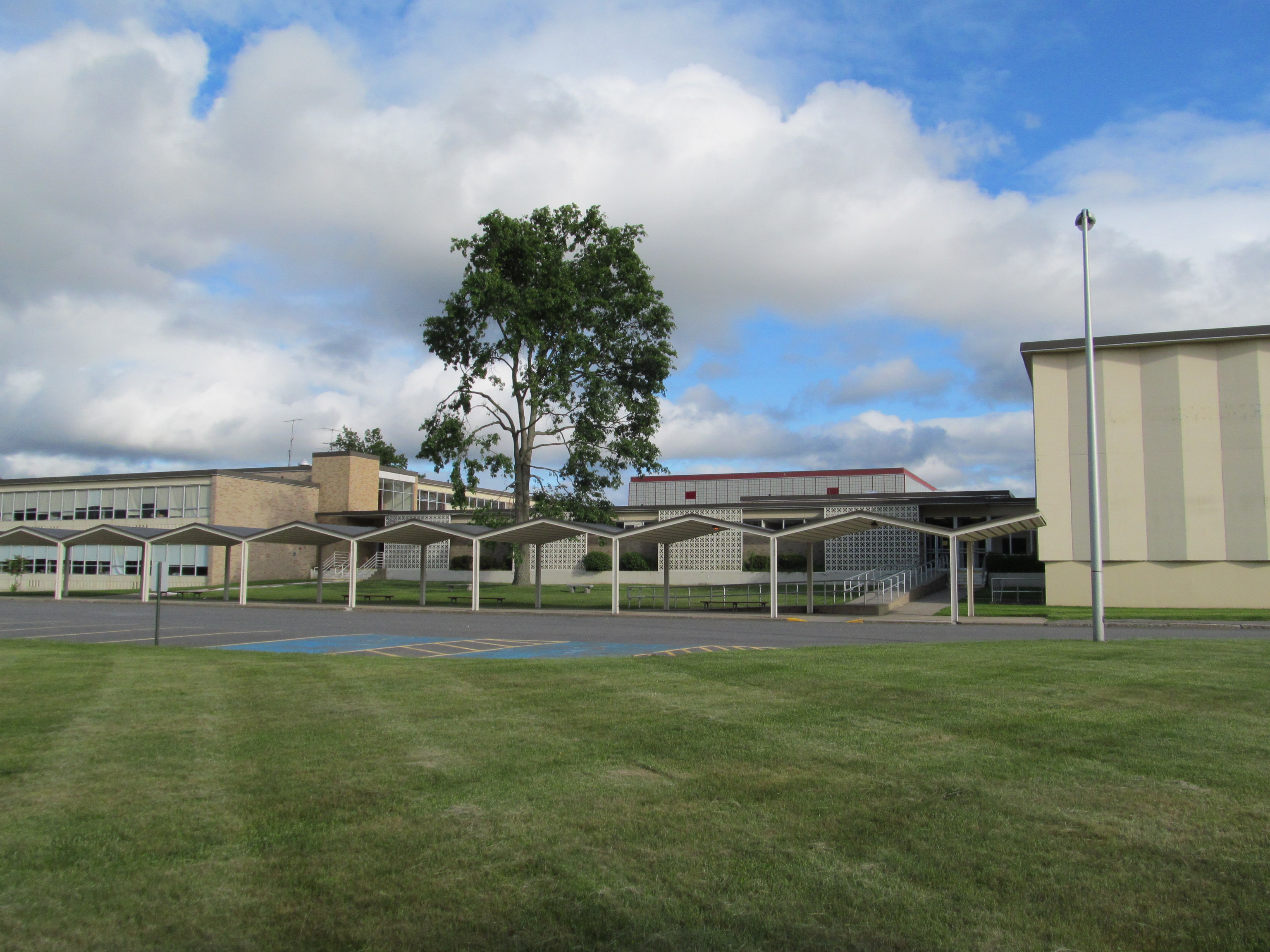
- Ayer Shirley Regional High School

Location
- 141 Washington Street; Ayer, MA 01432; United States; 42°34′0″N 71°34′31″W

Information
- Type: Public; Secondary; Open enrollment
- School district: Ayer Shirley School District
- Superintendent: Adam Renda
- Principal: Spencer Christie
- Teaching staff: 36.34 (FTE)
- Grades: 9–12
- Enrollment: 417 (2024–2025)
- Student to teacher ratio: 11.47
- Colors: Maroon and white
- Athletics conference: Midland Wachusett League
- Mascot: Panther
- Rivals: Nashoba Tech Vikings and Littleton Tigers
- Accreditation: NEASC
- Communities served: Ayer, Shirley
- Website: asrhs.asrsd.org

The Ayer Shirley Regional High School is located in Ayer, Massachusetts, United States. Its colors are maroon and white, and its mascot is the panther. This school educates about 350 students in 9th to 12th grades.

== Auditorium ==
The school's Laura S. Leavitt Auditorium was named after Ms. Leavitt, a Latin teacher.

== Notable alumni ==
- Rita Briggs, professional baseball player
- Jamie Morris, American football player
- Joe Morris, American football player
- Norbert Wiener (1906), mathematician
