= Andre Hardy =

American football player (born 1961)

No. 47
- Position: Running back

Personal information
- Born: November 28, 1961 (age 64); San Diego, California, U.S.
- Listed height: 6 ft 1 in (1.85 m)
- Listed weight: 233 lb (106 kg)

Career information
- High school: Herbert Hoover (San Diego)
- College: Saint Mary's; Weber State
- NFL draft: 1984: 5th round, 116th overall pick

Career history
- Philadelphia Eagles (1984); Seattle Seahawks (1985); San Francisco 49ers (1987); Seattle Seahawks (1987–1988)*
- * Offseason or practice squad member only

Career NFL statistics
- Rushing yards: 94
- Average: 3.6
- Receptions: 6
- Receiving yards: 36
- Stats at Pro Football Reference

Andre Elton Hardy (born November 28, 1961) is an American former professional football player who was a running back in the National Football League (NFL). He played for the Philadelphia Eagles in 1984, Seattle Seahawks in 1985, and San Francisco 49ers in 1987. He was selected by the Eagles in the fifth round of the 1984 NFL draft. He played college football at Weber State Wildcats and Saint Mary's Gaels.

In September 2026, Hardy published his first novel, Tear the City Down, a noir crime story.

== College career ==
Hardy played college football at Saint Mary's College of California and Weber State University.

== Professional career ==
=== Philadelphia Eagles ===
Hardy was selected by the Philadelphia Eagles in the fifth round (116th overall) of the 1984 NFL draft. He played in six games for the Eagles during the 1984 season. He had 14 rushes for 41 yards and two receptions for 22 yards. He was released on September 4, 1985, after the Eagles acquired Earnest Jackson from the San Diego Chargers.

=== Seattle Seahawks (first stint) ===
On October 9, 1985, Hardy was signed by the Seattle Seahawks. He was released on November 6 after playing in three games for the Seahawks.

=== San Francisco 49ers ===
Hardy signed with the San Francisco 49ers in 1987.

=== Seattle Seahawks (second stint) ===
Hardy was traded by the 49ers to the Seattle Seahawks in exchange for future draft picks on October 7, 1987. He was re-signed on May 12, 1988. He was released on August 23, 1988.

== Post-NFL career ==
Hardy published his debut novel, Tear the City Down, on September 1, 2026. It follows a retiring fixer named Coltrane Davis who sets out to find a missing NFL star. Paula L. Woods wrote in the Los Angeles Times that the book "brims with assurance and wry details that come from lived experiences and conversations" and called it an "overnight success". Hardy took heavy inspiration from jazz music, naming his protagonist after the musicians John Coltrane and Miles Davis.

== Personal life ==
Hardy's son Andre Hardy Jr. signed as an undrafted free agent tight end with the Oakland Raiders attempting to play football after playing college basketball.
