= 1988 Hall of Fame Bowl =

- 2nd Hall of Fame Bowl
Michigan Wolverines	Alabama Crimson Tide
(7–4)	(7–4)
Big Ten	SEC
28	24
Head coach: Gary Moeller	Head coach: Bill Curry
	1	2	3	4	Total
Michigan	0	14	7	7	28
Alabama	3	0	6	15	24
- Date: January 2, 1988
- Season: 1987
- Stadium: Tampa Stadium
- Location: Tampa, Florida
- MVP: Jamie Morris (Michigan RB)
- Referee: Dr. Larry Glass (MAC)
- Attendance: 60,156

United States TV coverage
- Network: NBC
- Announcers: Bob Costas, Ahmad Rashad, Paul Maguire

The 1988 Hall of Fame Bowl, part of the 1987 bowl game season, took place on January 2, 1988, at Tampa Stadium in Tampa, Florida. The competing teams in the second edition of the Hall of Fame Bowl were the Alabama Crimson Tide, representing the Southeastern Conference (SEC), and the Michigan Wolverines of the Big Ten Conference. In what was the first ever meeting between the schools, Michigan was victorious by a final score of 28–24.

== Teams ==
=== Alabama ===
The 1987 Alabama squad finished the regular season with losses to Florida, Memphis State, Notre Dame and Auburn to compile a 7–4 record. Following their loss against Auburn in the Iron Bowl, the Crimson Tide accepted an invitation to play in the Hall of Fame Bowl. The appearance marked the first for Alabama in the Hall of Fame Bowl, and their 40th overall bowl game.

=== Michigan ===
The 1987 Michigan squad finished the regular season with losses to Notre Dame, Michigan State, Indiana and Ohio State to finish with a record of 7–4. Their appearance marked the first for Michigan in the Hall of Fame Bowl, and their 19th overall bowl game. In mid December 1987, head coach Bo Schembechler underwent quadruple bypass heart surgery and was unable to coach in the bowl game. Due to this circumstance, Gary Moeller was given the coaching responsibilities for the game.

== Game summary ==
Alabama scored first following a 51-yard field goal by kicker Philip Doyle, and led 3–0 after the first quarter. In the second quarter, Jamie Morris scored on touchdown runs of 25 and 14 yards as Michigan took a 14–3 lead to halftime. In the third quarter, Morris scored on a 77-yard touchdown run, stretching Michigan's lead to 21–3. Alabama responded with a 16-yard touchdown pass from Jeff Dunn to tight end Howard Cross, making it 21–9. In the fourth quarter, Bobby Humphrey scored on touchdown runs of 1 and 17 yards as Alabama took a 24–21 lead. Michigan scored the game-winning touchdown on a 20-yard pass from Demetrius Brown to John Kolesar for a 28–24 win.

Scoring summary

Quarter	Time	Drive			Team	Scoring information	Score	
Quarter	Time	Plays	Yards	TOP	Team	Scoring information	Michigan	Alabama
1	8:43		10 plays, 42 yards		Alabama	51-yard field goal by Philip Doyle	0	3
2	5:21		1 play, 25 yards		Michigan	Jamie Morris 25-yard touchdown run, Mike Gillette kick good	7	3
2	0:47		11 plays, 76 yards		Michigan	Jamie Morris 14-yard touchdown run, Mike Gillette kick good	14	3
3	9:36		2 plays, 80 yards		Michigan	Jamie Morris 77-yard touchdown run, Mike Gillette kick good	21	3
3	4:55		11 plays, 72 yards		Alabama	Howard Cross 16-yard touchdown reception from Jeff Dunn, 2-point run failed	21	9
4	12:54				Alabama	Bobby Humphrey 1-yard touchdown run, Philip Doyle kick good	21	16
4	3:45		11 plays, 79 yards		Alabama	Bobby Humphrey 17-yard touchdown run, 2-point pass good	21	24
4	0:48		6 plays, 62 yards		Michigan	John Kolesar 20-yard touchdown reception from Demetrius Brown, Mike Gillette kick good	28	24
"TOP" = time of possession. For other American football terms, see Glossary of American football.							28	24
