= Joe Hayes (American football) =

American football player (born 1960)

No. 80
- Position: Running back

Personal information
- Born: September 15, 1960 (age 66); Dallas, Texas, U.S.
- Listed height: 5 ft 9 in (1.75 m)
- Listed weight: 185 lb (84 kg)

Career information
- High school: South Oak Cliff (Dallas)
- College: Central Oklahoma
- NFL draft: 1984: 7th round, 172nd overall pick

Career history
- Philadelphia Eagles (1984); Houston Oilers (1987)*
- * Offseason or practice squad member only
- Stats at Pro Football Reference

Joseph Herman Hayes (born September 15, 1960) is an American former professional football running back. He played for the Philadelphia Eagles in 1984.
