= Dana McLemore =

American football player (born 1960)

No. 43, 42
- Positions: Cornerback, kick returner

Personal information
- Born: July 1, 1960 (age 66); Los Angeles, California, U.S.
- Listed height: 5 ft 10 in (1.78 m)
- Listed weight: 183 lb (83 kg)

Career information
- High school: Venice (Los Angeles)
- College: Hawaii
- NFL draft: 1982: 10th round, 269th overall pick

Career history
- San Francisco 49ers (1982–1986); New Orleans Saints (1986); San Francisco 49ers (1987)

Awards and highlights
- Super Bowl champion (XIX); First-team All-WAC (1981)

Career NFL statistics
- Interceptions: 5
- Fumble recoveries: 3
- Kicking yards: 1,147
- Punting yards: 1,598
- Punt returns: 152
- Stats at Pro Football Reference

Dana McLemore (born July 1, 1960) is an American former professional football player who was a cornerback and kick returner in the National Football League (NFL) for the San Francisco 49ers and New Orleans Saints. He played college football for the Hawaii Rainbow Warriors.

== Biography ==
Dana McLemore attended Venice High School. He played college football at the University of Hawaiʻi. In the 1982 draft he was selected in the tenth round by the San Francisco 49ers and later signed.
