= 1985 Buffalo Bills season =

26th season in franchise history; second consecutive 2–14 season

- Owner: Ralph Wilson
- General manager: Terry Bledsoe
- Head coach: Kay Stephenson (weeks 1-4); Hank Bullough (weeks 5-16)
- Home stadium: Rich Stadium

Results
- Record: 2–14
- Division place: 5th AFC East
- Playoffs: Did not qualify
- Pro Bowlers: None

The 1985 Buffalo Bills season was the franchise's 16th season in the National Football League, and the 26th overall. It was Buffalo's second-consecutive 2–14 season. Head coach Kay Stephenson was fired after an 0–4 start. Defensive coordinator Hank Bullough took over, going 2–10 for the remainder of the season. For the second consecutive season, the Bills went winless on the road.

== Season summary ==
The Bills' offense was anemic; its 200 points scored was the lowest total in the 1980s, (Note: This excludes the strike-shortened, nine-regular-season-game 1982 season) and the lowest total in team history for a sixteen-game schedule. Having concluded that longtime starting quarterback Joe Ferguson's career was over after a spike in interceptions in the early 1980s, the Bills cut him in the offseason. (The assumption would be in error, as Ferguson would sign with the Detroit Lions and play an additional six seasons in the NFL after being released.) Ferguson's replacements, quarterbacks Vince Ferragamo and Bruce Mathison, only produced 9 passing touchdowns all season, while combining for a league-high 31 interceptions. Buffalo scored fewer than ten points in seven of its sixteen games. The team’s point-differential of negative-181 is the third-worst in franchise history.

== Offseason ==
=== NFL draft ===
In 1985, the Bills used the first overall pick in the draft to select All-American defensive end Bruce Smith. Smith would end up going on to dominate throughout the late 1980s and early 1990s. Smith was an 11-time All-Pro selection, two-time NFL Defensive Player of the Year, and logged an NFL-record 200 sacks (Note: As of 2020) by the end of his career.

Fourth-round pick Andre Reed, a wide receiver out of Kutztown (PA) State, would go on to be the leading receiver in Buffalo Bills history. When he retired after the 2000 season, Reed's 951 career receptions were third in NFL history behind Jerry Rice and Cris Carter.

Maryland quarterback Frank Reich would become famous for quarterbacking “The Comeback”, a 1993 playoff game in which Buffalo, down 35–3 in the third quarter, would score 35 unanswered points to win 41–38 in overtime. It is the largest deficit overcome to win a postseason game in NFL history. (Note: As of 2024)

Reed played more games with the Bills, 221, than any other player. Smith was second with 217 games.

1985 Buffalo Bills draft
Round	Pick	Player	Position	College	Notes
1	1	Bruce Smith * ^{†}	Defensive end	Virginia Tech	
1	14	Derrick Burroughs	Defensive back	Memphis	
2	29	Mark Traynowicz	Guard	Nebraska	
2	42	Chris Burkett	Wide receiver	Jackson State	
3	57	Frank Reich	Quarterback	Maryland	
3	63	Hal Garner	Linebacker	Utah State	
4	86	Andre Reed * ^{†}	Wide receiver	Kutztown State	
4	112	Dale Hellestrae	Offensive tackle	Southern Methodist	
5	130	Jimmy Teal	Wide receiver	Texas A&M	
6	141	Mike Hamby	Defensive end	Utah State	
7	169	Ron Pitts	Defensive back	UCLA	
8	197	Jacque Robinson	Fullback	Washington	
9	225	Glenn Jones	Defensive back	Norfolk State	
10	253	Chris Babyar	Guard	Illinois	
11	282	James Seawright	Linebacker	South Carolina	
12	333	Paul Woodside	Placekicker	West Virginia	
Made roster † Pro Football Hall of Fame * Made at least one Pro Bowl during career

== Personnel ==
=== Staff ===
1985 Buffalo Bills staff
Front office: President – Ralph Wilson; Senior Executive Vice President – Pat McGroder; Vice President of Administration/General Manager – Terry Bledsoe; Vice President of Football Operations – Kay Stephenson; Vice President of Player Personnel – Norm Pollom; Director of Pro Personnel – Bill Polian; Assistant Director of Player Personnel – Bob Ferguson; Head coaches: Head Coach – Kay Stephenson; Assistant Head Coach/Defensive Coordinator – Hank Bullough; Offensive coaches: Offensive Coordinator/Offensive Line – Jim Ringo; Quarterbacks – Kay Dalton; Running Backs / Special Teams coach – Elijah Pitts; Receivers – Bob Leahy; Tight Ends – Art Asselta	Defensive coaches: Defensive Line – Ardell Wiegandt; Linebackers – Monte Kiffin; Defensive Backfield – Dick Moseley; Strength and conditioning: Strength and Conditioning Coordinator – Rusty Jones

=== Roster ===
1985 Buffalo Bills roster
Quarterbacks (QB): 5 Vince Ferragamo; 7 Bruce Mathison; 14 Frank Reich; Running backs (RB): 28 Greg Bell; 20 Joe Cribbs; 34 Booker Moore; 47 Anthony Steels; Wide receivers (WR): 85 Chris Burkett; 80 Jerry Butler; 83 Andre Reed; 82 Eric Richardson; 86 Jimmy Teal; Tight ends (TE): 88 Pete Metzelaars; 87 Eason Ramson	Offensive linemen (OL): 69 Greg Christy T; 63 Justin Cross T; 70 Joe Devlin T; 53 Will Grant C; 72 Ken Jones T; 51 Jim Ritcher G; 62 Mark Traynowicz G; 65 Tim Vogler G; Defensive linemen (DL): 95 Sean McNanie DE; 79 Dean Prater DE; 76 Fred Smerlas NT; 78 Bruce Smith DE; 74 Don Smith DE; 77 Ben Williams DE	Linebackers (LB): 58 Anthony Dickerson OLB; 52 Guy Frazier OLB; 55 Jim Haslett ILB; 90 Steve Maidlow ILB; 54 Eugene Marve ILB; 57 Lucius Sanford OLB; 56 Darryl Talley OLB; 50 Eric Wilson ILB; Defensive backs (DB): 36 Rodney Bellinger CB; 29 Derrick Burroughs CB; 22 Steve Freeman SS; 25 Rod Hill CB; 48 Lawrence Johnson CB; 23 Jim Perryman SS; 26 Charles Romes CB; 21 Don Wilson FS; Special teams (ST): 4 John Kidd P; 11 Scott Norwood K	Reserve: 43 Martin Bayless S (IR); 81 Mitchell Brookins WR (IR); 59 Stan David LB (IR); 68 Joe DeLamielleure G (ret.); 99 Hal Garner LB (IR); 75 Mike Hamby DE (IR); 71 Dale Hellestrae T (IR); 30 Anthony Hutchison RB (IR); 27 Ron Pitts CB (IR); 40 Robb Riddick RB (IR); -- James Seawright LB (IR); Rookies in italics

== Regular season ==
=== Schedule ===
Week	Date	Opponent	Result	Record	Venue	Attendance
1	September 8	San Diego Chargers	**L** 9–14	0–1	Rich Stadium	67,597
2	September 15	at **New York Jets**	**L** 3–42	0–2	Giants Stadium	63,449
3	September 22	**New England Patriots**	**L** 14–17	0–3	Rich Stadium	40,334
4	September 29	Minnesota Vikings	**L** 20–27	0–4	Rich Stadium	45,667
5	October 6	at **Indianapolis Colts**	**L** 17–49	0–5	Hoosier Dome	60,003
6	October 13	at **New England Patriots**	**L** 3–14	0–6	Sullivan Stadium	40,462
7	October 20	**Indianapolis Colts**	**W** 21–9	1–6	Rich Stadium	28,430
8	October 27	at Philadelphia Eagles	**L** 17–21	1–7	Veterans Stadium	60,987
9	November 3	Cincinnati Bengals	**L** 17–23	1–8	Rich Stadium	25,640
10	November 10	Houston Oilers	**W** 20–0	2–8	Rich Stadium	21,881
11	November 17	at Cleveland Browns	**L** 7–17	2–9	Cleveland Municipal Stadium	54,478
12	November 24	**Miami Dolphins**	**L** 14–23	2–10	Rich Stadium	50,474
13	December 1	at San Diego Chargers	**L** 7–40	2–11	Jack Murphy Stadium	45,487
14	December 8	**New York Jets**	**L** 7–27	2–12	Rich Stadium	23,122
15	December 15	at Pittsburgh Steelers	**L** 24–30	2–13	Three Rivers Stadium	35,953
16	December 22	at **Miami Dolphins**	**L** 0–28	2–14	Miami Orange Bowl	64,811
Note: Intra-division opponents are in **bold** text.

=== Game summaries ===
==== Week 1 ====
Team	1	2	3	4	Total
• Chargers	7	7	0	0	14
Bills	3	6	0	0	9

- Date: September 8
- Location: Rich Stadium Orchard Park, NY
- Game start: 4:00 p.m. EST
- Game attendance: 67,597
- Game weather: 76 °F (24.4 °C); wind 11 miles per hour (18 km/h; 9.6 kn)
- Referee: Dick Jorgensen
- TV announcers (NBC): Phil Stone and Reggie Rucker

==== Week 3 ====
Team	1	2	3	4	Total
• **Patriots**	3	7	7	0	17
Bills	0	7	0	7	14

- Date: September 22
- Location: Rich Stadium • Orchard Park, New York
- Game start: 1:00 p.m. EST
- Game weather: 65 °F (18 °C) • Wind 7 mph (11 km/h)
- Referee: Jerry Seeman
- Television network: NBC

Scoring summary
1	NE	Tony Franklin 32-yard field goal	Patriots 3–0
2	BUF	Greg Bell 16-yard pass from Vince Ferragamo (Scott Norwood kick)	Bills 7–3
2	NE	Tony Collins 5-yard pass from Craig James (Tony Franklin kick)	Patriots 10–7
3	NE	Irving Fryar 85-yard punt return (Tony Franklin kick)	Patriots 17–7
4	BUF	Andre Reed 18-yard pass from Vince Ferragamo (Scott Norwood kick)	Patriots 17–14

==== Week 6 ====
Team	1	2	3	4	Total
Bills	0	3	0	0	3
• **Patriots**	0	0	7	7	14

- Date: October 13
- Location: Sullivan Stadium • Foxboro, Massachusetts
- Game start: 1:00 p.m. EST
- Game weather: 50 °F (10 °C) • Wind 12 mph (19 km/h)
- Referee: Gene Barth
- TV announcers (NBC): Len Berman and Reggie Rucker

Scoring summary
2	BUF	Scott Norwood 47-yard field goal	Bills 3–0
3	NE	Irving Fryar 16-yard pass from Steve Grogan (Tony Franklin kick)	Patriots 7–3
4	NE	Raymond Clayborn 27-yard interception return (Tony Franklin kick)	Patriots 14–3

==== Week 7 ====
Team	1	2	3	4	Total
Colts	3	3	3	0	9
• Bills	7	7	0	7	21

- Date: October 20
- Location: Rich Stadium
- Game start: 1:00 p.m. EST
- Game attendance: 28,430
- Game weather: 47 °F (8.3 °C); wind 8 miles per hour (13 km/h; 7.0 kn)
- Referee: Fred Wyant

Scoring summary
Q1	BUF	Bell 7 yard run (Norwood kick)	BUF 7–0
Q1	IND	Allegre 41 yard field goal	BUF 7–3
Q2	IND	Allegre 27 yard field goal	BUF 7–6
Q2	BUF	Bell 1 yard run (Norwood kick)	BUF 14–6
Q3	IND	Allegre 38 yard field goal	BUF 14–9
Q4	BUF	Metzelaars 3 yard pass from Ferragamo (Norwood kick)	BUF 21–9

==== Week 8 ====
Team	1	2	3	4	Total
Bills	7	3	7	0	17
• Eagles	0	0	0	21	21

- Date: October 27
- Location: Veterans Stadium
- Game start: 1:00 p.m. EST
- Game attendance: 60.987
- Game weather: 66 °F (18.9 °C); wind 17 miles per hour (27 km/h; 15 kn)
- Referee: Ben Dreith
- TV announcers (NBC): Tom Hammond and Dave Rowe

Scoring summary
Q1	BUF	Reed 14 yard run (Norwood kick)	BUF 7–0
Q2	BUF	Norwood 26 yard field goal	BUF 10–0
Q3	BUF	Reed 7 yard pass from Ferragamo (Norwood kick)	BUF 17-0
Q4	PHI	Jaworski 3 yard run (McFadden kick)	BUF 17–7
Q4	PHI	Hopkins 24 yard interception return (McFadden kick)	BUF 17–14
Q4	PHI	Quick 32 yard pass from Jaworski (McFadden kick)	PHI 21–17

==== Week 10 ====
Team	1	2	3	4	Total
Oilers	0	0	0	0	0
• Bills	10	0	10	0	20

- Date: November 10
- Location: Rich Stadium, Orchard Park, New York
- Game start: 1:00 p.m.
- Game weather: 45 °F (7.2 °C), wind 14 miles per hour (23 km/h; 12 kn)
- Referee: Bob Frederic

Scoring summary
1	BUF	Scott Norwood 24 yard field goal	Bills 3–0
1	BUF	Greg Bell 2 yard run (Scott Norwood kick)	Bills 10–0
3	BUF	Scott Norwood 23 yard field goal	Bills 13–0
3	BUF	Bruce Mathison 5 yard run (Scott Norwood kick)	Bills 20–0

==== Week 16 ====
Team	1	2	3	4	Total
Bills	0	0	0	0	0
• Dolphins	7	7	0	14	28

- Date: December 22
- Location: Orange Bowl, Miami, Florida
- Game start: 1:00 p.m. EST
- Game attendance: 64,811
- Game weather: 70 °F (21.1 °C); wind 12 miles per hour (19 km/h; 10 kn)
- Referee: Gene Barth
- TV announcers (NFL on NBC): Jay Randolph and Bob Griese

=== Standings ===
AFC East
	W	L	T	PCT	DIV	CONF	PF	PA	STK
^{(2)} Miami Dolphins	12	4	0	.750	6–2	9–3	428	320	W7
^{(4)} New York Jets	11	5	0	.688	6–2	9–3	393	264	W1
^{(5)} New England Patriots	11	5	0	.688	6–2	8–4	362	290	W1
Indianapolis Colts	5	11	0	.313	1–7	2–10	320	386	W2
Buffalo Bills	2	14	0	.125	1–7	2–12	200	381	L6
