= 1986 Buffalo Bills season =

27th season in franchise history; first with Jim Kelly and Marv Levy

- Owner: Ralph Wilson
- General manager: Bill Polian
- Head coach: Hank Bullough (2–7); Marv Levy (2–5)
- Home stadium: Rich Stadium

Results
- Record: 4–12
- Division place: 4th AFC East
- Playoffs: Did not qualify
- Pro Bowlers: None

The 1986 Buffalo Bills season was the franchise's 17th season in the National Football League, and the 27th overall.

Although the Bills were only 2–6 at the midway point of the season, their games were much more competitive than in years past. (Only two of their losses in the first eight games were by more than a touchdown.) Still, after a 6-point loss in week 9 to the Tampa Bay Buccaneers, the Bills fired coach Hank Bullough, and hired former Kansas City coach Marv Levy to replace him. (Though Levy was not on the Bills' coaching staff, he had served as a television analyst for the team during the 1986 preseason and was hired away from his executive role from the Montreal Alouettes because of that team's terminal financial situation.) Levy would win his first game with the Bills against Pittsburgh in Week Ten, and one more game against Kansas City in Week Thirteen, finishing with a 2–5 record in his first half-season as head coach. (Note: Levy would go on to coach the Bills for the subsequent eleven full seasons, before retiring after the 1997 season.)

Years later, Bills offensive tackle Will Wolford alleged that the team purposely lost the week 9 game to Tampa Bay in order to get Bullough fired.

The Bills ended their 22-game losing streak on the road by beating the Chiefs at Arrowhead Stadium, 17–14. Coincidentally the Bills beat the Chiefs 14–9, in a road game leading up to the losing streak in 1983.

== Offseason ==
At the end of the 1985 season, the Bills' future was in serious jeopardy; two consecutive seasons in which the team had finished 2–14 had driven attendance at Rich Stadium to less than 30,000 fans per game. 1985 first overall draft pick Bruce Smith, while he had a respectable rookie season, underperformed compared to expectations and was admittedly not putting his whole heart into the game of football. Quarterback Jim Kelly, whom the team had drafted in the first round of the 1983 draft as their franchise quarterback of the future, still refused to play in Buffalo and was prepared to play the 1986 season as a member of the New Jersey Generals of the United States Football League; the Generals' soon-to-be-displaced quarterback, Doug Flutie, who would become a Bill much later in his career, also rejected the team's overtures and stayed in the USFL. These rejections forced the Bills to sign Art Schlichter, a notorious compulsive gambler who had flamed out with the Indianapolis Colts, as their backup plan; Schlichter was to compete with Frank Reich, whom the Bills drafted the previous year, for the starting position.

Buffalo's fortunes underwent a drastic improvement before the season. On July 29, 1986, the USFL received only a nominal judgment in its antitrust lawsuit against the NFL, leaving the league without much-needed capital and forcing the end of its operations. With no other options, Kelly then signed with the Bills amid much fanfare, and Schlichter was released. The signing (along with those of fellow USFL refugees Ray Bentley and Kent Hull) doubled the team's home attendance.

=== NFL draft ===
University of Iowa running back Ronnie Harmon played for the Bills for four seasons. (Note: Harmon made the Pro Bowl with the San Diego Chargers in 1992.) Vanderbilt's Will Wolford played offensive tackle for the Bills for seven years, and was voted to the Pro Bowl in 1990 and 1992. (Note: Wolford made a third Pro Bowl with Indianapolis.) Linebacker Mark Pike played his entire 13-year career with the Bills, mostly as a special teams star; he is the NFL's all-time leader in tackles on special teams, with 283. Tight end Butch Rolle played for the Bills for 6 years, and at one point had a streak of ten consecutive receptions for touchdowns.

1986 Buffalo Bills draft
Round	Pick	Player	Position	College	Notes
1	16	Ronnie Harmon *	RB	Iowa	
1	20	Will Wolford *	OT	Vanderbilt	
3	77	Leonard Burton	C	South Carolina	
5	111	Carl Byrum	RB	Mississippi Valley State	
7	168	Bob Williams	TE	Penn State	
7	178	Mark Pike	LB	Georgia Tech	
7	180	Butch Rolle	TE	Michigan State	
8	202	Tony Furjanic	LB	Notre Dame	
9	222	Reggie Bynum	WR	Oregon State	
10	251	Guy Tefatiller	DT	Illinois	
11	278	Tony Garbarczyk	DT	Wake Forest	
11	282	Billy Witt	DE	North Alabama	
12	313	Brian McClure	QB	Bowling Green	
12	331	Derek Christian	LB	West Virginia	
Made roster † Pro Football Hall of Fame * Made at least one Pro Bowl during career

== Personnel ==
=== Staff ===
1986 Buffalo Bills staff
Front office: President – Ralph Wilson; Vice President of Administration/General Manager – Bill Polian; Vice President of Football Operations – Hank Bullough; Director of player personnel – Norm Pollom; Assistant director of Player Personnel – Bob Ferguson; Administrative Assistant to the Head Coach – Jim Valek; Head coaches: Head coach – Hank Bullough; Offensive coaches: Offensive coordinator/Offensive Line – Jim Ringo; Quarterbacks/Passing Game Coordinator – Bob Leahy; Running Backs – Elijah Pitts; Receivers – Joe Daniels; Tight Ends – Joe Faragalli	Defensive coaches: Defensive coordinator/Inside Linebackers – Herb Paterra; Defensive Line – Ted Cottrell; Outside Linebackers – Ardell Wiegandt; Defensive Backfield – Dick Moseley; Special teams coaches: Special Teams – Elijah Pitts; Strength and conditioning: Strength and Conditioning Coordinator – Rusty Jones

=== Roster ===
1986 Buffalo Bills roster
Quarterbacks (QB): 8 Stan Gelbaugh; 12 Jim Kelly; 14 Frank Reich; Running backs (RB): 33 Ronnie Harmon; 49 Bruce King; 40 Robb Riddick; 34 Gary Wilkins; Wide receivers (WR): 85 Chris Burkett; 83 Andre Reed; 82 Eric Richardson; 89 Steve Tasker; 86 Jimmy Teal; Tight ends (TE): 84 Don Kern; 88 Pete Metzelaars; 87 Butch Rolle	Offensive linemen (OL): 70 Joe Devlin T; 71 Dale Hellestrae T; 67 Kent Hull C; 72 Ken Jones T; 51 Jim Ritcher G; 62 Mark Traynowicz G; 65 Tim Vogler; 73 Will Wolford T; Defensive linemen (DL): 75 Mike Hamby DE; 95 Sean McNanie DE; 68 Kurt Ploeger DE; 79 Dean Prater DE; 76 Fred Smerlas NT; 78 Bruce Smith DE; 74 Don Smith NT	Linebackers (LB): 50 Ray Bentley ILB; 53 Tony Furjanic ILB; 99 Hal Garner OLB; 54 Eugene Marve ILB; 57 Lucius Sanford OLB; 56 Darryl Talley OLB; Defensive backs (DB): 43 Martin Bayless SS; 36 Rodney Bellinger CB; 45 Dwight Drane SS; 22 Steve Freeman FS; 27 Ron Pitts CB; 26 Charles Romes CB; 23 Kevin Williams CB; Special teams (ST): 4 John Kidd P; 11 Scott Norwood K	Reserve: 28 Greg Bell RB (IR); 81 Mitchell Brookins WR (IR); 89 Walter Broughton WR (IR); 29 Derrick Burroughs CB (IR); 61 Leonard Burton C (IR); 80 Jerry Butler WR (IR); 35 Carl Byrum FB (IR); 69 Greg Christy T (IR); 41 Steve Clark S (IR); 63 Justin Cross T (IR); 55 Jim Haslett LB (IR); 48 Lawrence Johnson CB (IR); 38 Mark Kelso S (IR); 13 Brian McClure QB (IR); 60 Jim Melka LB (IR); 64 Mark Pike LB (IR); 52 James Seawright LB (IR); -- Bob Williams TE (IR); -- Billy Witt DE (IR); Rookies in italics

== Regular season ==
=== Transactions ===
- Steve Tasker was claimed off waivers by the Buffalo Bills on November 8, 1986.

=== Schedule ===
Week	Date	Opponent	Result	Record	Venue	Attendance
1	September 7	**New York Jets**	**L** 24–28	0–1	Rich Stadium	79,951
2	September 14	at Cincinnati Bengals	**L** 33–36	0–2	Riverfront Stadium	52,714
3	September 21	St. Louis Cardinals	**W** 17–10	1–2	Rich Stadium	65,762
4	September 28	Kansas City Chiefs	**L** 17–20	1–3	Rich Stadium	67,555
5	October 5	at **New York Jets**	**L** 13–14	1–4	Giants Stadium	69,504
6	October 12	at **Miami Dolphins**	**L** 14–27	1–5	Miami Orange Bowl	49,467
7	October 19	**Indianapolis Colts**	**W** 24–13	2–5	Rich Stadium	50,050
8	October 26	**New England Patriots**	**L** 3–23	2–6	Rich Stadium	77,808
9	November 2	at Tampa Bay Buccaneers	**L** 28–34	2–7	Tampa Stadium	32,806
10	November 9	Pittsburgh Steelers	**W** 16–12	3–7	Rich Stadium	72,000
11	November 16	**Miami Dolphins**	**L** 24–34	3–8	Rich Stadium	76,474
12	November 23	at **New England Patriots**	**L** 19–22	3–9	Sullivan Stadium	60,455
13	November 30	at Kansas City Chiefs	**W** 17–14	4–9	Arrowhead Stadium	31,492
14	December 7	Cleveland Browns	**L** 17–21	4–10	Rich Stadium	42,213
15	December 14	at **Indianapolis Colts**	**L** 14–24	4–11	Hoosier Dome	52,783
16	December 21	at Houston Oilers	**L** 7–16	4–12	Astrodome	31,409
Note: Intra-division opponents are in **bold** text.

=== Game summaries ===
==== Week 1 vs. Jets ====
New York Jets (0–0) at Buffalo Bills (0–0)

Quarter	1	2	3	4	Total
Jets	7	7	0	14	**28**
Bills	7	3	0	14	**24**

at Rich Stadium • Orchard Park, New York

- Date: September 7
- Game time: 4:00 p.m. EDT
- Game weather: 56 °F or 13.3 °C • Wind 12 miles per hour (19 km/h; 10 kn)
- Game attendance: 79,951
- Referee: Jerry Markbreit
- TV announcers (NBC): Marv Albert and Bob Griese
- Pro-Football-Reference.com

Game information

Jets

- Ken O'Brien
  18/25, 318 Yds, 2 TD
- Freeman McNeil
  21 Rush, 72 Yds
- Al Toon
  6 Rec, 119 Yds, TD

Bills

- Jim Kelly
  20/33, 292 Yds, 3 TD
- Greg Bell
  17 Rush, 44 Yds
- Andre Reed
  5 Rec, 95 Yds, TD

Three years after being drafted by the Bills, Jim Kelly debuted in front of the home crowd with 292 yards passing and three touchdowns but it was not enough to overcome the divisional rival Jets.

Scoring summary

Quarter	Time	Drive			Team	Scoring information	Score	
Quarter	Time	Plays	Yards	TOP	Team	Scoring information	NYJ	BUF
1	8:55				Bills	Bell 2-yard touchdown reception from Kelly, Norwood kick good	0	7
1	6:14				Jets	Paige 2-yard touchdown run, Leahy kick good	7	7
2	3:51				Jets	Toon 46-yard touchdown reception from O'Brien, Leahy kick good	14	7
2	3:05				Bills	19-yard field goal by Norwood	14	10
4	14:00				Bills	Reed 55-yard touchdown reception from Kelly, Norwood kick good	14	17
4	9:58				Jets	Hector 1-yard touchdown run, Leahy kick good	21	17
4	5:24				Jets	Walker 71-yard touchdown reception from O'Brien, Leahy kick good	28	17
4	3:55				Bills	Metzelaars 4-yard touchdown reception from Kelly, Norwood kick good	28	24
"TOP" = time of possession. For other American football terms, see Glossary of American football.							28	24

==== Week 2 at Bengals ====
Team	1	2	3	4	OT	Total
Bills	3	6	17	7	0	33
• Bengals	7	14	0	12	3	36

- Date: September 14
- Location: Riverfront Stadium
- Game attendance: 52,714
- Referee: Red Cashion
- TV announcers (NBC): Len Berman and John Hannah

==== Week 3 ====
Team	1	2	3	4	Total
Cardinals	0	0	3	7	10
• Bills	0	10	0	7	17

- Date: September 21
- Location: Rich Stadium, Orchard Park, New York
- Game start: 1:00 p.m.
- Game weather: 57 °F or 13.9 °C; wind 7 miles per hour (11 km/h; 6.1 kn)
- Referee: Jim Tunney
- TV announcers (CBS): Jack Buck and Joe Theismann

Scoring summary
Q2	BUF	Norwood 35 yard field goal	BUF 3–0
Q2	BUF	Moore 2 yard run (Norwood kick)	BUF 10–0
Q3	STL	Lee 27 yard field goal	BUF 10–3
Q4	BUF	Bell 6 yard run (Norwood kick)	BUF 17–3
Q4	STL	Sikahema 19 yard pass from Lomax (Lee kick)	BUF 17–10

==== Week 4 ====
Team	1	2	3	4	Total
• Chiefs	3	7	0	10	20
Bills	7	0	7	3	17

- Date: September 28
- Location: Rich Stadium
- Referee: Jerry Seeman

==== Week 5 ====
Buffalo Bills (1-3) at New York Jets (3-1)

Team	1	2	3	4	Total
Bills	0	7	3	3	13
• Jets	0	7	0	7	14

- Date: October 5
- Location: Giants Stadium
- Game start: 4:00 PM EST
- Game attendance: 69,504
- Game weather: 68 °F or 20 °C; wind 18 miles per hour (29 km/h; 16 kn)
- Referee: Ben Dreith
- TV announcers (NBC): Marv Albert and Bob Griese

Scoring summary
Q2	NYJ	Al Toon 4 yard pass from Ken O'Brien (Pat Leahy kick)	NYJ 7–0
Q2	BUF	Greg Bell 40 yard pass from Jim Kelly (Norwood kick)	TIE 7–7
Q3	BUF	Norwood 23 yard field goal	BUF 10–7
Q4	BUF	Norwood 32 yard field goal	BUF 13–7
Q4	NYJ	Mickey Shuler 36 yard pass from Ken O'Brien (Pat Leahy kick)	NYJ 14–13

==== Week 6 ====
Team	1	2	3	4	Total
Bills	7	0	0	7	14
• Dolphins	3	7	10	7	27

- Date: October 12
- Location: Miami Orange Bowl - Miami, Florida
- Game start: 1:00 PM EST
- Game attendance: 49,467
- Game weather: 83 °F or 28.3 °C; wind 10 miles per hour (16 km/h; 8.7 kn)
- Referee: Fred Wyant
- TV announcers (NBC): Don Criqui and Bob Trumpy

==== Week 7 ====
Team	1	2	3	4	Total
Colts	3	3	7	0	13
• Bills	7	10	7	0	24

- Date: October 19
- Location: Rich Stadium, Orchard Park, New York
- Game start: 1:00 p.m.
- Game weather: 42 °F or 5.6 °C; wind 9 miles per hour (14 km/h; 7.8 kn)
- Referee: Fred Silva

Scoring summary
Q1	BUF	Bellinger 15 yard fumble return (Norwood kick)	BUF 7–0
Q1	IND	Biasucci 46 yard field goal	BUF 7–3
Q2	BUF	Norwood 37 yard field goal	BUF 10–3
Q2	IND	Biasucci 44 yard field goal	BUF 10–6
Q2	BUF	Reed 6 yard pass from Kelly (Norwood kick)	BUF 17–6
Q3	IND	Brooks 18 yard pass from Trudeau (Biasucci kick)	BUF 17–13
Q3	BUF	Reed 13 yard pass from Kelly (Norwood kick)	BUF 24–13

==== Week 8 ====
Team	1	2	3	4	Total
• Patriots	7	10	3	3	23
Bills	0	0	3	0	3

- Date: October 26
- Location: Rich Stadium
- Referee: Bob McElwee

==== Week 9 ====
Team	1	2	3	4	Total
Bills	0	0	14	14	28
• Buccaneers	10	10	0	14	34

- Date: November 2
- Location: Tampa Stadium
- Referee: Jim Tunney

==== Week 10 ====
Team	1	2	3	4	Total
Steelers	0	0	12	0	12
• Bills	6	7	0	3	16

- Date: November 9
- Location: Rich Stadium Orchard Park, NY
- Game start: 1:00 p.m. EST
- Game attendance: 72,000
- Game weather: 55 °F or 12.8 °C; wind 27 miles per hour (43 km/h; 23 kn); gust 37 miles per hour (60 km/h; 32 kn)
- Referee: Gordon McCarter
- TV announcers (NBC): Jay Randolph and Reggie Rucker

Scoring summary
Q1	6:15	BUF	Reed 3 yard pass from Kelly (kick failed)	BUF 6–0
Q2	3:06	BUF	Riddick 5 yard run (Norwood kick)	BUF 13–0
Q3	14:44	PIT	Jackson 5 yard run (kick failed)	BUF 13–6
Q3	10:11	PIT	Thompson 11 yard pass from Malone (kick failed)	BUF 13–12
Q4	10:18	BUF	Norwood 29 yard field goal	BUF 16–12

- Marv Levy first game as Buffalo Bills head coach.
- First Buffalo head coach to win coaching debut

External videos
- 1986 Pittsburgh Steelers at Buffalo Bills - Full game broadcast

==== Week 11 ====
Miami Dolphins (4-6) at Buffalo Bills (3-7)

Team	1	2	3	4	Total
• Dolphins	0	10	10	14	34
Bills	7	14	3	0	24

- Date: November 16
- Location: Rich Stadium Orchard Park, NY
- Game start: 1:00 PM EST
- Game attendance: 76,474
- Game weather: 36 °F or 2.2 °C; wind 10 miles per hour (16 km/h; 8.7 kn), cloudy, light rain
- Referee: Bob Frederic
- TV announcers (NBC): Gary Gerould and John Hannah

==== Week 12 ====
Team	1	2	3	4	Total
Bills	0	3	3	13	19
• Patriots	9	6	0	7	22

- Date: November 23
- Location: Sullivan Stadium
- Referee: Dick Hantak

==== Week 13 ====
Team	1	2	3	4	Total
• Bills	0	10	7	0	17
Chiefs	7	0	0	7	14

- Date: November 30
- Location: Arrowhead Stadium
- Referee: Tom Dooley

==== Week 14 ====
Team	1	2	3	4	Total
• Browns	7	7	7	0	21
Bills	0	3	7	7	17

- Date: December 7, 1986
- Location: Rich Stadium Orchard Park, NY
- Game start: 1:00 PM EST
- Elapsed time: 2h 39m
- Game attendance: 42,213
- Game weather: 33 °F or 0.6 °C; wind 16 miles per hour (26 km/h; 14 kn); wind chill 2 °F or −16.7 °C
- Referee: Fred Silva
- TV announcers (NBC): Len Berman and John Hannah

==== Week 15 ====
Team	1	2	3	4	Total
Bills	7	7	0	0	14
• Colts	0	0	14	10	24

- Date: December 14
- Location: Hoosier Dome
- Game weather: Indoors (dome)
- Referee: Gordon McCarter

==== Week 16 ====
Team	1	2	3	4	Total
Bills	0	7	0	0	7
• Oilers	7	3	3	3	16

- Date: December 21
- Location: Astrodome
- Game weather: Indoors (dome)
- Referee: Ben Dreith

=== Standings ===
AFC East
	W	L	T	PCT	DIV	CONF	PF	PA	STK
^{(3)} New England Patriots	11	5	0	.688	7–1	8–4	412	307	W1
^{(4)} New York Jets	10	6	0	.625	6–2	8–4	364	386	L5
Miami Dolphins	8	8	0	.500	5–3	6–6	430	405	L1
Buffalo Bills	4	12	0	.250	1–7	3–11	287	348	L3
Indianapolis Colts	3	13	0	.188	1–7	2–10	229	400	W3
