= 1984 Buffalo Bills season =

25th season in franchise history

- Owner: Ralph Wilson
- Head coach: Kay Stephenson
- Home stadium: Rich Stadium

Results
- Record: 2–14
- Division place: 5th AFC East
- Playoffs: Did not qualify
- Pro Bowlers: RB Greg Bell

The 1984 Buffalo Bills season was the franchise's 15th season in the National Football League, and the 25th overall. The team started the season with eleven consecutive losses before an upset home win over the Dallas Cowboys in Week 12. The 1984 Bills gave up a team-record 454 points on defense, an average of more than 28 per game.

The Bills gave up 30+ points eight times and allowed fewer than 20 points in a game only three times all season. The Bills also allowed sixty quarterback sacks, for a total of 554 yards, the most-ever at the time. The Bills’ 4,341 total yards gained was second-worst in the league in 1984 (only the Colts gained fewer total yards). The 1984 Bills are one of only two NFL teams to have been outscored by 25 points six different times during the season. This season is notable for being Pete Carroll’s first NFL coaching experience. The Bills failed to win a single road game.

== Offseason ==
=== Uniform change ===
For the third time in team history, the Bills changed their helmets. While keeping the streaking buffalo logo from the second change, the Bills changed their helmet color from white to red. They would keep the red helmet through the 2010 season. It was the Bills first major change to their helmets since changing from the "standing Bison" to the streaking buffalo before the 1974 season. Since three of the Bills' four AFC Eastern division opponents—Miami, Indianapolis and New England—then had white helmets (the Jets wore green helmets but would wear white ones from 1998 to 2018; the Patriots have used silver helmets since 1993), "it was easier for [Ferguson] to distinguish and that's the reason why we made the switch." Ferguson had thrown a high number of interceptions over the previous two seasons, and coach Kay Stephenson hoped it would help the quarterback reduce them. Ironically, 1984 was Ferguson's last year with the Bills, and only year with the red helmets; Ferguson, after 107 consecutive starts dating to the 1977 season (at the time tied with the league record), was benched in favor of Joe Dufek on September 30. Ferguson's interception total actually increased compared to the previous year, and he would go on to play for at least three more teams (Tampa Bay Buccaneers, Indianapolis Colts and Canadian football's San Antonio Texans) that all had white helmets.

The Bills wore white jerseys for all 1984 home games, the only time they have done so in franchise history. Buffalo wore white at home occasionally every other year from 1980 to 1986, and has done so since 2011.

=== NFL draft ===
Notre Dame running back Greg Bell made the Pro Bowl in his rookie season; he was later traded to the Los Angeles Rams in the blockbuster three-team Eric Dickerson trade. Defensive end Sean McNanie played for the team for four of his seven NFL seasons. Punter John Kidd played his first six seasons with Buffalo; his career lasted a total of 15 seasons.

1984 Buffalo Bills draft
Round	Pick	Player	Position	College	Notes
1	26	Greg Bell *	Running back	Notre Dame	
2	41	Eric Richardson	Wide receiver	San Jose State	
3	77	Rodney Bellinger	Defensive back	Miami (FL)	
3	79	Sean McNanie	Defensive end	San Diego State	
3	82	Speedy Neal	Running back	Miami (FL)	
4	95	Mitchell Brookins	Wide receiver	Illinois	
5	128	John Kidd	Punter	Northwestern	
6	155	Tony Slaton	Center	USC	
7	182	Stan David	Linebacker	Texas Tech	
8	209	Stacy Rayfield	Defensive back	Texas–Arlington	
9	236	Leroy Howell	Defensive end	Appalachian State	
10	263	Joe Azelby	Linebacker	Harvard	
11	299	Craig White	Wide receiver	Missouri	
12	322	Russell Davis	Wide receiver	Maryland	
Made roster * Made at least one Pro Bowl during career

== Personnel ==
=== Staff ===
1984 Buffalo Bills staff
Front office: President – Ralph Wilson; Senior executive vice-president – Pat McGroder; Vice-president of administration/General Manager – Terry Bledsoe; Vice-president of football operations – Kay Stephenson; Vice-president of player personnel – Norm Pollom; Director of pro personnel – Bill Polian; Assistant director of player personnel – Bruce Nicholas; Head coaches: Head coach – Kay Stephenson; Offensive coaches: Quarterbacks – John Becker; Running backs – Andy MacDonald; Receivers – Milt Jackson; Tight ends – Perry Moss; Offensive line – Jim Niblack	Defensive coaches: Defensive coordinator/defensive line – Don Lawrence; Linebackers – Monte Kiffin; Defensive backfield – Pete Carroll; Defensive assistant – Miller McCalmon; Special teams coaches: Special teams – Miller McCalmon; Strength and conditioning: Strength and Conditioning Coordinator – Jim Speros

=== Roster ===
1984 Buffalo Bills roster
Quarterbacks (QB): 19 Joe Dufek; 12 Joe Ferguson; 10 Matt Kofler; Running backs (RB): 28 Greg Bell; 34 Booker Moore; 41 Speedy Neal; 40 Robb Riddick; 23 Van Williams; Wide receivers (WR): 81 Mitchell Brookins; 89 Julius Dawkins; 83 Preston Dennard; 85 Byron Franklin; 88 Mike Mosley; 27 Craig White; Tight ends (TE): 84 Buster Barnett; 86 Mark Brammer; 87 Tony Hunter; 49 Ulysses Norris	Offensive linemen (OL): 73 Jon Borchardt G; 70 Joe Devlin T; 53 Will Grant C; 72 Ken Jones T; 61 Tom Lynch T/G; 51 Jim Ritcher G; 65 Tim Vogler G/C; Defensive linemen (DL): 75 Bill Acker NT; 92 LeRoy Howell DE; 91 Ken Johnson DE; 95 Sean McNanie DE; 79 Dean Prater DE; 76 Fred Smerlas NT; 77 Ben Williams DE	Linebackers (LB): 50 Joe Azelby ILB; 59 Stan David OLB; 55 Jim Haslett ILB; 52 Chris Keating OLB; 54 Eugene Marve ILB; 56 Darryl Talley OLB; 60 Al Wenglikowski OLB; Defensive backs (DB): 43 Martin Bayless SS; 36 Rodney Bellinger CB; 30 Brian Carpenter CB; 22 Steve Freeman SS; 48 Lawrence Johnson CB; 42 Rod Kush FS; 26 Charles Romes CB; 21 Don Wilson FS; Special teams (ST): 4 John Kidd P; 13 Chuck Nelson K	Reserve: 80 Jerry Butler WR (PUP); 63 Justin Cross T (IR); -- Reggie Gipson RB (IR); 25 Rod Hill CB (IR); 38 Jeff Nixon S (IR); 74 Jimmy Payne DE (IR); 58 Steve Potter LB (NF-Ill.); 82 Eric Richardson WR (IR); 57 Lucius Sanford LB (IR); -- Roger Taylor T (IR); Rookies in italics

== Regular season ==
=== Schedule ===
Week	Date	Opponent	Result	Record	Venue	Attendance
1	September 2	**New England Patriots**	**L** 17–21	0–1	Rich Stadium	48,528
2	September 9	at St. Louis Cardinals	**L** 7–37	0–2	Busch Memorial Stadium	35,785
3	September 17	**Miami Dolphins**	**L** 17–21	0–3	Rich Stadium	65,455
4	September 23	**New York Jets**	**L** 26–28	0–4	Rich Stadium	48,330
5	September 30	at **Indianapolis Colts**	**L** 17–31	0–5	Hoosier Dome	60,032
6	October 7	Philadelphia Eagles	**L** 17–27	0–6	Rich Stadium	37,555
7	October 14	at Seattle Seahawks	**L** 28–31	0–7	Kingdome	59,034
8	October 21	Denver Broncos	**L** 7–37	0–8	Rich Stadium	31,204
9	October 28	at **Miami Dolphins**	**L** 7–38	0–9	Miami Orange Bowl	58,824
10	November 4	Cleveland Browns	**L** 10–13	0–10	Rich Stadium	33,343
11	November 11	at **New England Patriots**	**L** 10–38	0–11	Sullivan Stadium	43,313
12	November 18	Dallas Cowboys	**W** 14–3	1–11	Rich Stadium	74,391
13	November 25	at Washington Redskins	**L** 14–41	1–12	RFK Stadium	51,513
14	December 2	**Indianapolis Colts**	**W** 21–15	2–12	Rich Stadium	20,693
15	December 8	at **New York Jets**	**L** 17–21	2–13	Giants Stadium	45,378
16	December 16	at Cincinnati Bengals	**L** 21–52	2–14	Riverfront Stadium	55,771
Note: Intra-division opponents are in **bold** text.

=== Game summaries ===
==== Week 3 (Monday, September 17, 1984): vs. Miami Dolphins ====
Week 3: Miami Dolphins at Buffalo Bills

Quarter	1	2	3	4	Total
Dolphins (3–0)	7	7	7	0	**21**
Bills (0–3)	0	3	7	7	**17**

at Rich Stadium • Orchard Park, New York

- Date: September 17, 1984
- Game time: 9:01 p.m. EDT
- Game weather: 54 °F (12 °C); wind 8 miles per hour (13 km/h; 7.0 kn)
- Game attendance: 65,455
- Referee: Bob Frederic
- TV announcers (ABC): Frank Gifford (play-by-play) and O. J. Simpson (color commentator)

Team	Category	Player	Statistics
MIA	Passing		
MIA	Rushing		
MIA	Receiving		
BUF	Passing		
BUF	Rushing		
BUF	Receiving		

Scoring summary

Quarter	Time	Drive			Team	Scoring information	Score	
Quarter	Time	Plays	Yards	TOP	Team	Scoring information	MIA	BUF
1	2:09	8	62	5:13	Dolphins	Duper 11-yard touchdown reception from Marino, von Schamann kick good	7	0
2	5:04	9	52	4:20	Dolphins	Clayton 12-yard touchdown reception from Marino, von Schamann kick good	14	0
2	0:05	5	18	1:11	Bills	33-yard field goal by Danelo	14	3
3	11:27	9	57	3:21	Dolphins	Moore 1-yard touchdown reception from Marino, von Schamann kick good	21	3
3	3:57	15	80	6:30	Bills	Williams 1-yard touchdown run, Danelo kick good	21	10
4	9:20	9	79	3:43	Bills	Dawkins 13-yard touchdown reception from Ferguson, Danelo kick good	21	17
"TOP" = time of possession. For other American football terms, see Glossary of American football.							21	17

- Point spread:
- Over/under:
- Time of game: 3 hours, 15 minutes

Dolphins	Game statistics	Bills
	First downs	
	Rushes–yards	
	Passing yards	
	Passes	
	Sacked–yards	
	Net passing yards	
	Total yards	
	Return yards	
	Punts	
	Fumbles–lost	
	Penalties–yards	
	Time of Possession	

- Buffalo had now gone the first three weeks without scoring a TD in the first half.

==== Week 7 ====
Team	1	2	3	4	Total
Bills	0	14	7	7	28
• Seahawks	17	0	7	7	31

- Date: October 14
- Location: Kingdome
- Game start: 4:00 PM EDT
- Game attendance: 59,034
- Game weather: Dome
- Referee: Fred Wyant
- TV announcers (ABC / Local Buffalo Broadcast / WKBW): Rick Azar and Marv Levy

==== Week 9 (Sunday, October 28, 1984): at Miami Dolphins ====
Week 9: Buffalo Bills at Miami Dolphins

Quarter	1	2	3	4	Total
Bills (0–9)	0	0	0	7	**7**
Dolphins (9–0)	7	17	0	14	**38**

at Miami Orange Bowl • Miami, Florida

- Date: October 28, 1984
- Game time: 4:01 p.m. EST
- Game attendance: 58,824
- Referee: Gene Barth
- TV announcers (NBC): Charlie Jones (play-by-play) and Bob Griese (color commentator)
- Pro-Football-Reference.com

Team	Category	Player	Statistics
BUF	Passing		
BUF	Rushing		
BUF	Receiving		
MIA	Passing		
MIA	Rushing		
MIA	Receiving		

Scoring summary

Quarter	Time	Drive			Team	Scoring information	Score	
Quarter	Time	Plays	Yards	TOP	Team	Scoring information	BUF	MIA
1	3:18	7	80	3:06	Dolphins	Clayton 7-yard touchdown reception from Marino, von Schamann kick good	0	7
2	14:53	3	47	1:20	Dolphins	Johnson 10-yard touchdown reception from Marino, von Schamann kick good	0	14
2	7:55	10	77	4:50	Dolphins	22-yard field goal by von Schamann	0	17
2	2:33	4	75	1:05	Dolphins	Clayton 65-yard touchdown reception from Marino, von Schamann kick good	0	24
4	14:19	7	64	3:42	Dolphins	Bennett 1-yard touchdown run, von Schamann kick good	0	31
4	3:26	12	68	7:44	Dolphins	Johnson 1-yard touchdown run, von Schamann kick good	0	38
4	1:22	10	75	2:04	Bills	Dennard 5-yard touchdown reception from Kofler, Danelo kick good	7	38
"TOP" = time of possession. For other American football terms, see Glossary of American football.							7	38

- Point spread:
- Over/under:
- Time of game: 2 hours, 54 minutes

Bills	Game statistics	Dolphins
	First downs	
	Rushes–yards	
	Passing yards	
	Passes	
	Sacked–yards	
	Net passing yards	
	Total yards	
	Return yards	
	Punts	
	Fumbles–lost	
	Penalties–yards	
	Time of Possession	

==== Week 12 ====
Team	1	2	3	4	Total
Cowboys	0	3	0	0	3
• Bills	7	0	0	7	14

- Date: November 18
- Location: Rich Stadium, Orchard Park, New York
- Game start: 1:00 p.m. EST
- Game attendance: 74,391
- Game weather: 38 °F (3.3 °C); wind 17 miles per hour (27 km/h; 15 kn)
- Referee: Bob McElwee
- TV announcers (CBS): Dick Stockton and Hank Stram

Scoring summary
Q1	BUF	Bell 85 yard run (Nelson kick)	BUF 7–0
Q2	DAL	Septien 20 yard field goal	BUF 7–3
Q4	BUF	Bell 3 yard pass from Ferguson (Nelson kick)	BUF 14–3

- Greg Bell 27 Rush, 206 Yds

==== Week 13 ====
Team	1	2	3	4	Total
Bills	0	7	7	0	14
• Redskins	17	10	7	7	41

- Date: November 25
- Location: RFK Stadium
- Game start: 1:00 p.m. EST
- Game attendance: 51,513
- Game weather: 43 °F or 6.1 °C, relative humidity 66%, wind 6 miles per hour (9.7 km/h; 5.2 kn)
- Referee: Ben Dreith
- TV announcers (NBC): Jay Randolph & Reggie Rucker

==== Week 14 ====
Team	1	2	3	4	Total
Colts	0	9	3	3	15
• Bills	21	0	0	0	21

- Date: December 2
- Location: Rich Stadium, Orchard Park, New York
- Game start: 1:00 p.m.
- Game weather: 35 °F (1.7 °C); wind 14 miles per hour (23 km/h; 12 kn)
- Referee: Pat Haggerty

Scoring summary
Q1	BUF	Bell 7 yard run (Nelson kick)	BUF 7–0
Q1	BUF	Hunter 18 yard pass from Duek (Nelson kick)	BUF 14–0
Q1	BUF	Franklin 64 yard pass from Dufek (Nelson kick)	BUF 21–0
Q2	IND	Safety, Wilson tackled in end zone	BUF 21–2
Q2	IND	Middleton 14 yard pass from Schlichter (Allegre kick)	BUF 21–9
Q3	IND	Allegre 28 yard field goal	BUF 21–12
Q4	IND	Allegre 21 yard field goal	BUF 21–15

==== Week 16 ====
Team	1	2	3	4	Total
Bills	7	0	7	7	21
• Bengals	7	21	3	21	52

- Date: December 16, 1984
- Location: Riverfront Stadium, Cincinnati, Ohio
- Game start: 1:00 p.m. EST
- Game attendance: 55,771
- Game weather: 59 °F or 15.0 °C, wind 15 miles per hour (24 km/h; 13 kn)
- Referee: Chuck Heberling
- TV announcers (NBC): Charlie Jones & Bob Griese

=== Standings ===
AFC East
	W	L	T	PCT	DIV	CONF	PF	PA	STK
^{(1)} Miami Dolphins	14	2	0	.875	8–0	10–2	513	298	W2
New England Patriots	9	7	0	.563	6–2	9–3	362	352	W1
New York Jets	7	9	0	.438	3–5	7–7	332	364	L1
Indianapolis Colts	4	12	0	.250	2–6	4–8	239	414	L5
Buffalo Bills	2	14	0	.125	1–7	1–11	250	454	L2
