= Ware Shoals Inn =

- U.S. National Register of Historic Places
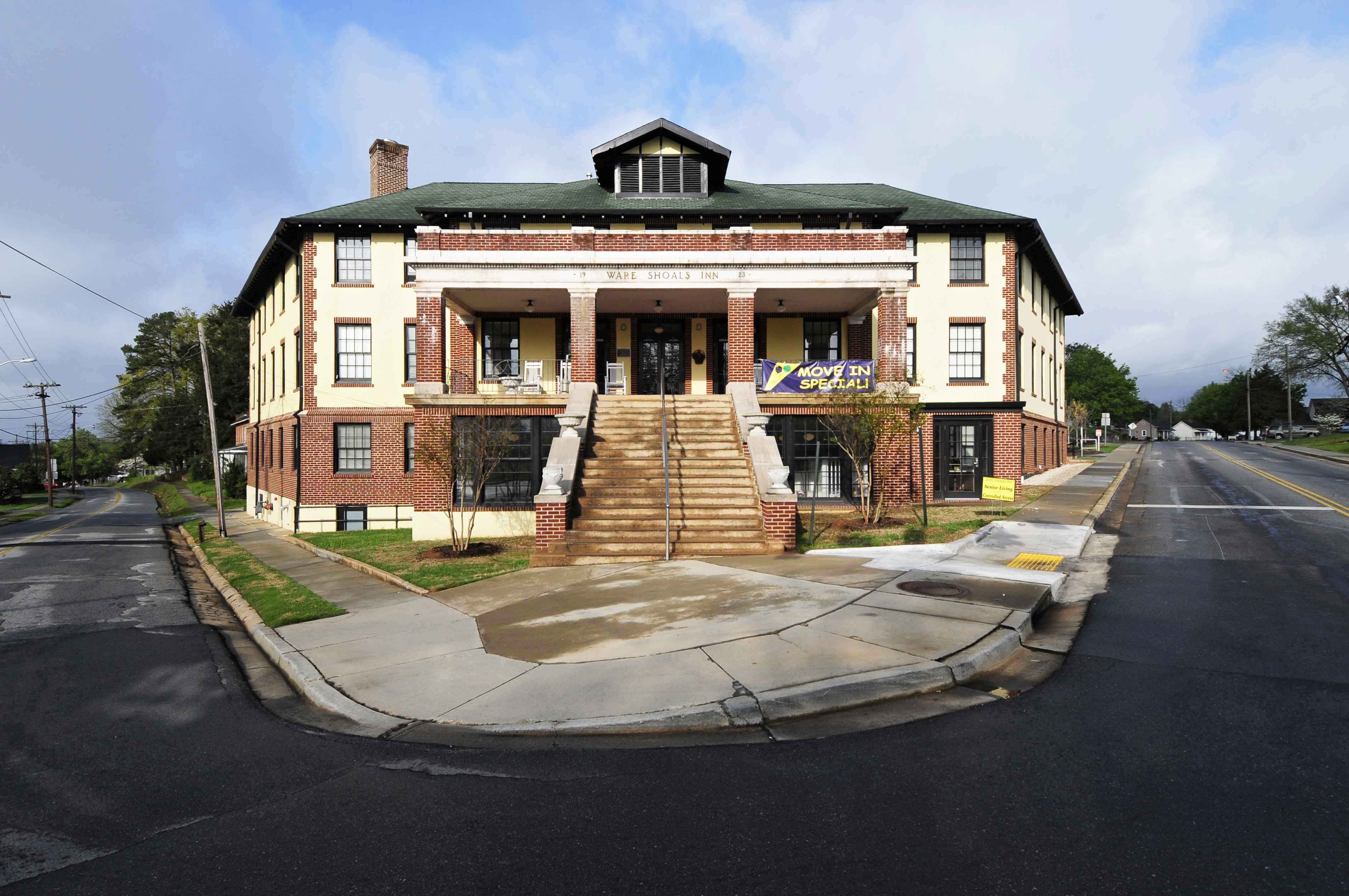
- Ware Shoals Inn, March 2012

- Location within South Carolina Location within the United States
- Location: 1 Greenwood Ave. N., Ware Shoals, South Carolina
- Coordinates: 34.39863°N 82.24695°W
- Area: less than one acre
- Built: 1923
- Architectural style: Classical Revival, Bungalow/craftsman
- NRHP reference No.: 07001130
- Added to NRHP: November 1, 2007

Ware Shoals Inn is a historic hotel located at Ware Shoals, Greenwood County, South Carolina. It was built by the Ware Shoals Manufacturing Company in 1923, and is a three-story brick building with a partial basement. The modified V-shaped building features a raised porch at its truncated vertex. The Inn's design incorporates elements of the Arts and Crafts movement and Colonial Revival style.

It was listed on the National Register of Historic Places in 2007.
