= Greg Bell (running back, born 1962) =

American football player (born 1962)

No. 28, 42
- Position: Running back

Personal information
- Born: August 1, 1962 (age 64); Columbus, Ohio, U.S.
- Listed height: 5 ft 10 in (1.78 m)
- Listed weight: 210 lb (95 kg)

Career information
- High school: South (Columbus)
- College: Notre Dame
- NFL draft: 1984: 1st round, 26th overall pick

Career history
- Buffalo Bills (1984–1987); Los Angeles Rams (1987-1989); Los Angeles Raiders (1990); Green Bay Packers (1992)*
- * Offseason or practice squad member only

Awards and highlights
- NFL Comeback Player of the Year (1988); Pro Bowl (1984); 2× NFL rushing touchdowns leader (1988, 1989); PFWA All-Rookie Team (1984)

Career NFL statistics
- Rushing yards: 4,959
- Rushing average: 4.1
- Rushing touchdowns: 51
- Stats at Pro Football Reference

Gregory Leon Bell (born August 1, 1962) is an American former professional football player who was a running back in the National Football League (NFL) for the Buffalo Bills, Los Angeles Rams and Los Angeles Raiders, from 1984 to 1990.

Bell played college football for the Notre Dame Fighting Irish and was selected by the Bills in the first round of the 1984 NFL draft. Before going to Notre Dame, he attended South High School in Columbus, Ohio.

== College statistics ==
- 1980: 5 carries for 66 yards and one touchdown.
- 1981: 92 carries for 512 yards and 6 touchdowns. 11 catches for 135 yards. 13 kick returns for 371 yards and 1 touchdown.
- 1982: 24 carries for 123 yards and 1 touchdown. 3 catches for 20 yards. 3 kick returns for 50 yards. 1 punt return for 12 yards.
- 1983: 37 carries for 169 yards and 4 touchdowns. 6 catches for 65 yards and 1 touchdown. 5 kick returns for 108 yards. 10 punt returns for 55 yards.

== Professional career ==
Bell was drafted by the Buffalo Bills in the first round of the 1984 NFL Draft with the 26th overall pick. He was a one-time Pro Bowler after his rookie year in 1984 with the Bills after having a 1,100 rushing yards and a seven touchdown season. Bell had his best year after the 1988 NFL season with the Rams, in which he had 1,212 rushing yards and led the league with sixteen touchdowns. He had a similar season the year after in which Bell had 1,137 rushing yards and fifteen touchdowns, again leading the league. To that point, no other running back had ever led the league in rushing touchdowns in consecutive seasons without entering the Pro Football Hall of Fame, and Bell attempted to hold out for a better contract. The Rams instead traded him to the Raiders, who had a loaded backfield consisting of Marcus Allen, Bo Jackson, and Napoleon McCallum; Bell barely saw the field and was out of the NFL after that season.

== NFL career statistics ==
Legend
	Led the league
**Bold**	Career high

=== Regular season ===
Year	Team	Games		Rushing					Receiving				
Year	Team	GP	GS	Att	Yds	Avg	Lng	TD	Rec	Yds	Avg	Lng	TD
1984	BUF	16	15	262	1,100	**4.2**	**85**	7	34	277	8.1	37	1
1985	BUF	16	15	223	883	4.0	77	8	**58**	**576**	9.9	**49**	1
1986	BUF	6	6	90	377	**4.2**	42	4	12	142	**11.8**	40	**2**
1987	BUF	2	2	14	60	4.3	11	0	4	37	9.3	12	0
1987	RAM	2	1	8	26	3.3	13	0	5	59	11.8	32	1
1988	RAM	16	13	**288**	**1,212**	**4.2**	44	**16**	24	124	5.2	20	**2**
1989	RAM	16	15	272	1,137	**4.2**	47	15	19	85	4.5	14	0
1990	RAI	6	0	47	164	3.5	21	1	1	7	7.0	7	0
Career		80	67	1,204	4,959	4.1	85	51	157	1,307	8.3	49	7

=== Postseason ===
Year	Team	Games		Rushing					Receiving				
Year	Team	GP	GS	Att	Yds	Avg	Lng	TD	Rec	Yds	Avg	Lng	TD
1988	RAM	1	1	17	91	5.4	22	0	0	0	0.0	0	0
1989	RAM	3	3	**54**	**231**	4.3	**54**	**1**	**5**	**57**	11.4	**23**	0
1990	RAI	1	0	5	36	**7.2**	11	0	2	26	**13.0**	21	0
Career		5	4	76	358	4.7	54	1	7	83	11.9	23	0
