= Jerry Butler (American football) =

American football player (born 1957)

No. 80
- Position: Wide receiver

Personal information
- Born: October 12, 1957 (age 69); Ware Shoals, South Carolina, U.S.
- Listed height: 6 ft 0 in (1.83 m)
- Listed weight: 178 lb (81 kg)

Career information
- High school: Ware Shoals (SC)
- College: Clemson
- NFL draft: 1979: 1st round, 5th overall pick

Career history

Playing
- Buffalo Bills (1979–1986)

Coaching
- Cleveland Browns (1999–2000) Wide receivers coach

Operations
- Cleveland Browns (2001–2011) Director of player development

Awards and highlights
- Pro Bowl (1980); PFWA All-Rookie Team (1979); Sporting News AFC Rookie of the Year (1979); UPI AFC Rookie of the Year (1979); First-team All-American (1978); 2× First-team All-ACC (1977, 1978)

Career NFL statistics
- Receptions: 278
- Receiving yards: 4,301
- Touchdowns: 29
- Stats at Pro Football Reference

Jerry O'Dell Butler (born October 12, 1957) is an American former professional football player who spent his entire career as a wide receiver for the Buffalo Bills of the National Football League (NFL) from 1979 to 1986. He played college football for the Clemson Tigers. He was selected in the first round of the 1979 NFL draft with the fifth overall pick. Butler was a Pro Bowl selection in 1980. In his career, he caught 278 receptions for 4,301 yards and 29 touchdowns.

On September 23, 1979, Butler had 255 receiving yards and 4 touchdown catches (5 yds, 75 yds, 74 yds, 9 yds) in the Bills 46-31 win over the New York Jets in Week 4.

Butler coached wide receivers in 1999 and 2000 for Cleveland, then served as Director of Player Development for the Cleveland Browns until his contract ended in 2011. Butler was the Buffalo Bills- NFL “Man of Year” in 1981 and 1982, honored in 1983 by the Buffalo and Erie County YMCA with the Jackie Robinson Award, and Buffalo Bills Ed Block Courage Award recipient in 1985.

== College career ==
Recruited out of Ware Shoals high school, Jerry Butler played in one game during the 1975 season for the Clemson Tigers. Despite Clemson having a losing record and being at the bottom of the ACC standings, the Tigers did have star players that would go on to the pros. In his sophomore season, Butler was catching passes from quarterback Steve Fuller and was part of a receiving core that included Joey Walters and Dwight Clark. During the 1976 season, Butler caught 33 passes for 484 yards and four touchdowns. However, Clemson still languished in the basement of the ACC, going 0-4-1 in conference play. The next season, Red Parker was out as head coach and Charley Pell was named to replace him. Butler emerged as Fuller's primary target. In his junior season, Butler caught 43 passes for 760 yards and four touchdowns. Clemson improved under Pell, and finally, Butler was part of a winning college football program. In 1978, Butler was part of the Clemson squad that won the ACC championship. However, before the Gator Bowl, head coach Charley Pell bolted to take the Florida head coaching position and assistant Danny Ford took over. Butler caught 4 passes for 44 yards and no scores in the Gator Bowl. However, this game is more remember for the final two minutes of the game more than anything that transpired prior. This was the game in which Tigers linebacker Charlie Baumann intercepted an errant Art Schlichter pass, and later punched by Ohio State head coach Woody Hayes.

During the 1977, Butler was part of one of the infamous games in the Clemson/South Carolina rivalry. Clemson needed to beat the Gamecocks, who were 5-5 and eliminated from bowl contention. If South Carolina won, they'd derail Clemson's bid to get into the Gator bowl and have their first Bowl appearance since 1959. Up 24–0, Clemson began to falter, and South Carolina pulled within four points. The score was 24–20 when South Carolina quarterback Ron Bass found Phil Logan on a 4th and 10 play that results in a 40-yard touchdown strike and a Gamecocks 27–24 lead. After the Clemson drive had brought the Tigers to the Gamecocks 18 yard line, thanks in part to a Fuller to Clark pass, the Tigers tried to run a hurry up play. However, the Gamecocks managed to get pressure on Fuller, causing him to release the pass quicker than he wanted to. Fuller released the awkward pass, which was hauled in by Butler, who'd make a twisting leap for the ball. He caught the ball in the end zone for the score, securing what would be a 31–27 win over South Carolina. The play would go down in Clemson/South Carolina lore as "The Catch".

== Professional career ==
Butler was selected by the Buffalo Bills in the first round of the 1979 NFL draft, being the fifth player overall taken. His Clemson teammate Steve Fuller was selected by the Kansas City Chiefs in the same round, 23rd overall. Butler beat out Lou Piccone for the starting role opposite Frank Lewis. In his rookie season, Butler caught 48 passes for 834 yards and four touchdowns as the Bills, led by head coach Chuck Knox finished 7–9. In Week Four of his rookie season, the Bills were losing to their AFC East rival, the New York Jets when the Ferguson/Butler combo lead the Bills to a 75- and 74-yard score to take a lead the Bills would never surrender on their way to a 46–31 win. Butler had 255 yards receiving in the game, a record that would stand for 25 years until it was broken by Lee Evans in a game against the Houston Texans. The next season, Butler and Bills quarterback Joe Ferguson helped lead the Bills to an 11–5 record and a division title. Though the season ended in a divisional playoff loss to the San Diego Chargers, Butler was named to his first and only Pro Bowl.

After a stellar 1981 season, the 1982 season was disrupted by a work stoppage brought on by the NFL players strike. It seemed as if Butler was going to pick up where he left off during the 1983 season, until Week Nine against the New Orleans Saints. In the first quarter, Butler caught a 16-yard TD strike from Ferguson in a game the Bills would go on to win 27–21. However, Butler injured his knee in the game and would miss not only the rest of the 1983 season, but the entire 1984 season as well.

Butler made a comeback in 1985. He started 13 games that season, opposite Andre Reed. Butler caught 41 passes for 770 yards and 2 touchdowns. Midway through the 1986 season, Hank Bullough was fired as head coach, and replaced by Marv Levy. On November 16, 1986, Butler caught a touchdown pass from Bills quarterback Jim Kelly, but came down wrong on his ankle, and shattered it. Butler laid on the turf in the end zone as his teammates and Dolphins players each took a knee. The cart was brought out and Butler was placed on it, leaving the field for the final time as an active player. Despite multiple surgeries, Butler was unable to comeback and was forced to retire. Butler established himself as a community leader. He was the Buffalo Bills- NFL “Man of Year” in 1981 and 1982, and Buffalo Bills Ed Block Courage Award recipient in 1985.

== NFL career statistics ==
Legend
| **Bold** | Career high |

=== Regular season ===
| Year | Team | Games | | Receiving | | | | |
| Year | Team | GP | GS | Rec | Yds | Avg | Lng | TD |
|---|---|---|---|---|---|---|---|---|
| 1979 | BUF | 13 | 13 | 48 | 834 | 17.4 | **75** | 4 |
| 1980 | BUF | **16** | **16** | **57** | 832 | 14.6 | 69 | 6 |
| 1981 | BUF | **16** | **16** | 55 | **842** | 15.3 | 67 | **8** |
| 1982 | BUF | 7 | 7 | 26 | 336 | 12.9 | 47 | 4 |
| 1983 | BUF | 9 | 9 | 36 | 385 | 10.7 | 25 | 3 |
| 1985 | BUF | **16** | 13 | 41 | 770 | 18.8 | 60 | 2 |
| 1986 | BUF | 11 | 6 | 15 | 302 | **20.1** | 53 | 2 |
| | | 88 | 80 | 278 | 4,301 | 15.5 | 75 | 29 |

=== Playoffs ===
| Year | Team | Games | | Receiving | | | | |
| Year | Team | GP | GS | Rec | Yds | Avg | Lng | TD |
|---|---|---|---|---|---|---|---|---|
| 1980 | BUF | 1 | 1 | 2 | 19 | 9.5 | 12 | 0 |
| 1981 | BUF | **2** | **2** | **5** | **104** | **20.8** | **54** | **1** |
| | | 3 | 3 | 7 | 123 | 17.6 | 54 | 1 |

== Front office, awards and achievements ==
In 2019, Butler won the Brian Dawkins Lifetime Achievement Award, which honors former Clemson players for their leadership not just on the field, but in the community as well. In 2015, Butler was hired by the Chicago Bears as their director of player development. Butler had also held front office positions with the Bills, Cleveland Browns, Denver Broncos and was a receivers coach for a season with the Browns. Just two years later, Butler retired from football, and left his position with the Bears.

In 1986, Butler was named to the Clemson Tigers Hall of Fame. Ten years later, he was named to Clemson's Centennial team, and finally, in 1998, he was named to Clemson's Ring of Honor.

In 2019, Jerry Butler was inducted into the Ware Shoals High School Hall of Fame.
