= John Kidd (American football) =

American football player (born 1961)

No. 4, 10, 17
- Position: Punter

Personal information
- Born: August 22, 1961 (age 65); Springfield, Illinois, U.S.
- Listed height: 6 ft 3 in (1.91 m)
- Listed weight: 215 lb (98 kg)

Career information
- High school: Findlay (Findlay, Ohio)
- College: Northwestern
- NFL draft: 1984: 5th round, 128th overall pick

Career history
- Buffalo Bills (1984–1989); San Diego Chargers (1990–1994); Miami Dolphins (1994–1997); Detroit Lions (1998); New York Jets (1998)

Awards and highlights
- Second-team All-Big Ten (1982); First-team All-Big Ten (1983); Football News first-team All-America (1983); Gannett News Services second-team All-America (1983); UPI second-team All-Conference (1996)

Career NFL statistics
- Punts: 957
- Punt yards: 39,716
- Longest punt: 67
- Stats at Pro Football Reference

Max John Kidd (born August 22, 1961) is an American former professional football player who was a punter in the National Football League (NFL). He played 15 seasons for the Buffalo Bills, San Diego Chargers, Miami Dolphins, Detroit Lions and New York Jets.

Kidd played college football for the Northwestern Wildcats before Buffalo selected him in the fifth round of the 1984 NFL draft, the highest-selected punter in Bills history. He was the starting quarterback and punter at Findlay High School in Findlay, Ohio, from which he graduated in 1980.

Kidd was a first-team All-Big Ten and first-team All American in college and won the Big Ten Conference Medal of Honor. He continues to hold the career punting average record for his college alma mater, Northwestern (41.8), where he also holds the single-season average (45.6).

During his 1994–97 tenure with the NFL's Dolphins, he established the career punting average record (44.2) for the franchise that stood until Brandon Fields joined the team in 2007 and surpassed Kidd in 2010. In 1996, Kidd led the NFL with a 46.3 punting average.

== NFL career statistics ==
Legend
	Led the league
**Bold**	Career high

=== Regular season ===
Year	Team	Punting									
Year	Team	GP	Punts	Yds	Net Yds	Lng	Avg	Net Avg	Blk	Ins20	TB
1984	BUF	**16**	88	3,696	2,939	63	42.0	32.7	**2**	16	8
1985	BUF	**16**	**92**	**3,818**	**3,320**	**67**	41.5	36.1	0	**33**	3
1986	BUF	**16**	75	3,031	2,591	57	40.4	34.5	0	14	9
1987	BUF	12	64	2,495	2,207	**67**	39.0	34.5	0	20	7
1988	BUF	**16**	62	2,451	2,189	60	39.5	35.3	0	13	2
1989	BUF	**16**	65	2,564	2,137	60	39.4	31.9	**2**	15	10
1990	SDG	**16**	61	2,442	2,271	59	40.0	36.6	1	14	2
1991	SDG	**16**	76	3,064	2,677	60	40.3	34.8	1	22	6
1992	SDG	**16**	68	2,899	2,475	65	42.6	36.4	0	22	9
1993	SDG	14	57	2,431	2,048	**67**	42.6	35.9	0	16	7
1994	SDG	2	7	246	226	53	35.1	32.3	0	1	1
1994	MIA	4	14	602	407	58	43.0	29.1	0	2	3
1995	MIA	**16**	57	2,433	2,068	56	42.7	36.3	0	15	5
1996	MIA	**16**	78	3,611	3,023	63	**46.3**	**38.8**	0	26	**11**
1997	MIA	13	52	2,247	1,924	58	43.2	37.0	0	13	4
1998	DET	2	13	520	454	54	40.0	34.9	0	1	0
1998	NYJ	8	28	1,166	1,033	57	41.6	36.9	0	8	2
Career		215	957	39,716	33,989	67	41.5	35.3	6	251	89

=== Playoffs ===
Year	Team	Punting									
Year	Team	GP	Punts	Yds	Net Yds	Lng	Avg	Net Avg	Blk	Ins20	TB
1988	BUF	**2**	10	428	398	50	42.8	39.8	0	2	0
1989	BUF	1	3	124	124	46	41.3	**41.3**	0	0	0
1992	SDG	**2**	**13**	**587**	**497**	55	**45.2**	38.2	0	**5**	2
1994	MIA	**2**	8	356	275	**59**	44.5	34.4	0	2	**3**
1995	MIA	1	3	115	115	49	38.3	38.3	0	1	0
1997	MIA	1	7	262	252	47	37.4	36.0	0	1	0
1998	NYJ	**2**	9	404	328	53	44.9	36.4	0	3	0
Career		11	53	2,276	1,989	59	42.9	37.5	0	14	5
