= Ware Shoals, South Carolina =

- Town
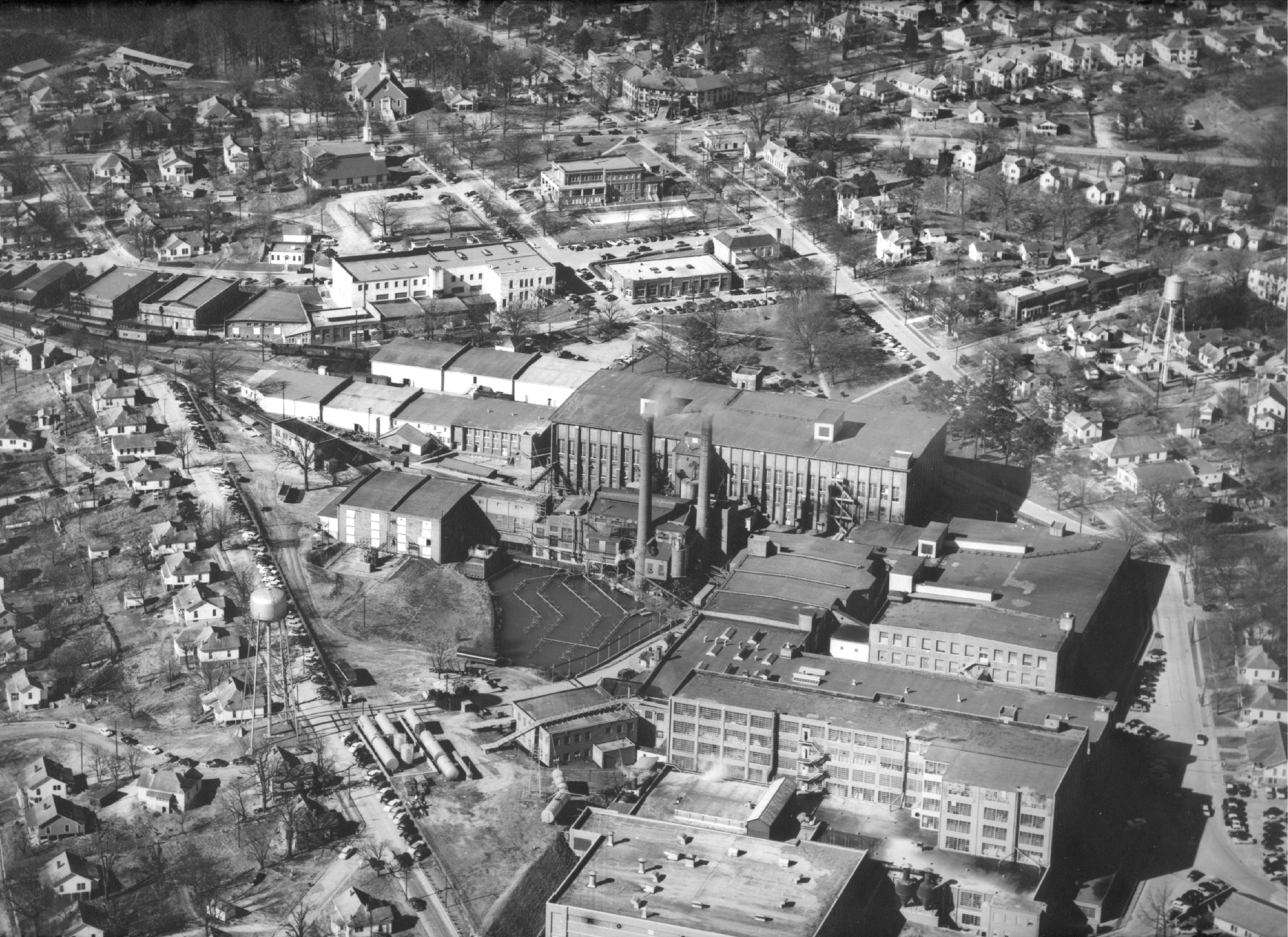
- A bird's eye view of the mill in the 1950s. Katherine Hall is seen just behind the mill.

- Logo

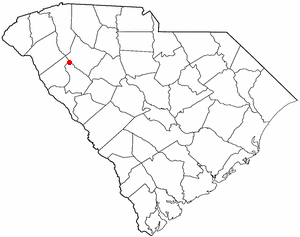
- Location within the state of South Carolina
- Coordinates: 34°23′22″N 82°13′45″W
- Country: United States
- State: South Carolina
- Counties: Greenwood, Abbeville, Laurens

Area
  - Total: 3.37 sq mi (8.73 km^{2})
  - Land: 3.28 sq mi (8.49 km^{2})
  - Water: 0.093 sq mi (0.24 km^{2})
- Elevation: 623 ft (190 m)

Population (2020)
  - Total: 1,701
  - Density: 519.1/sq mi (200.42/km^{2})
- Time zone: UTC-5 (Eastern (EST))
  - Summer (DST): UTC-4 (EDT)
- ZIP code: 29692
- Area codes: 864, 821
- FIPS code: 45-74680
- GNIS feature ID: 2406831
- Website: www.wareshoalssc.com

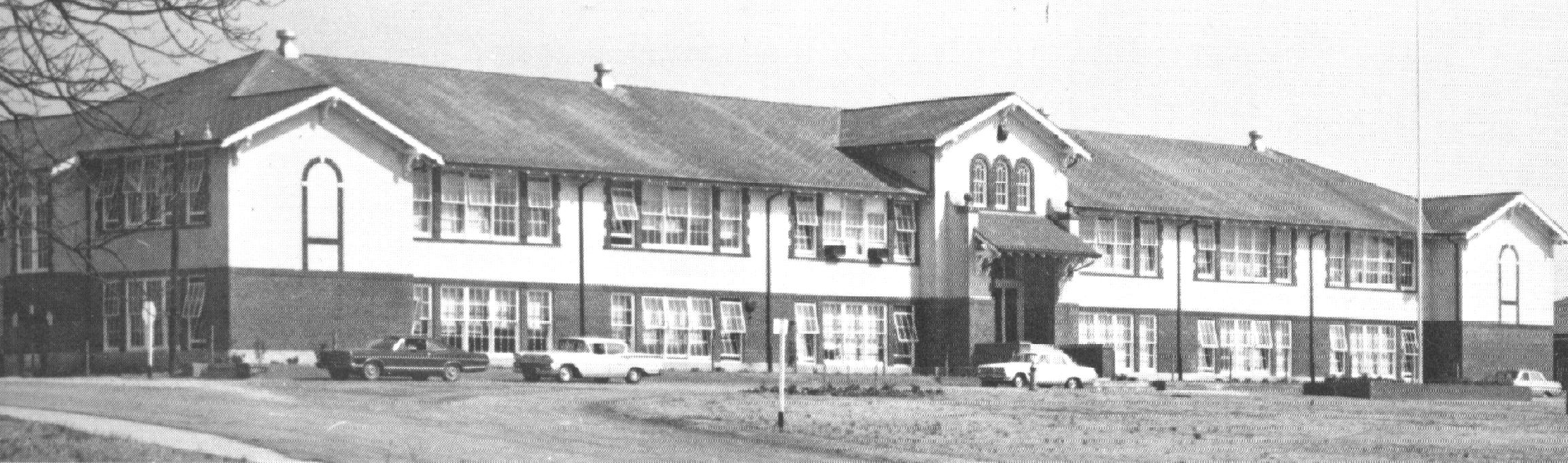
Historic Ware Shoals High School

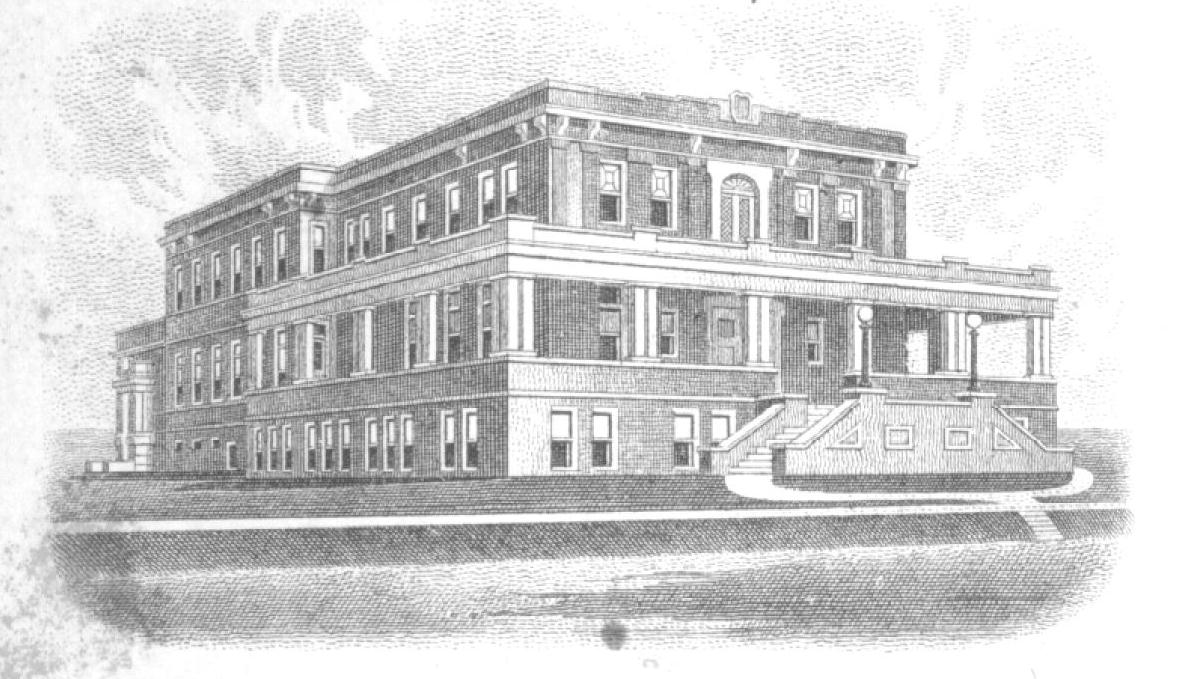
A post card from the 1920s brags on the town's community hall.

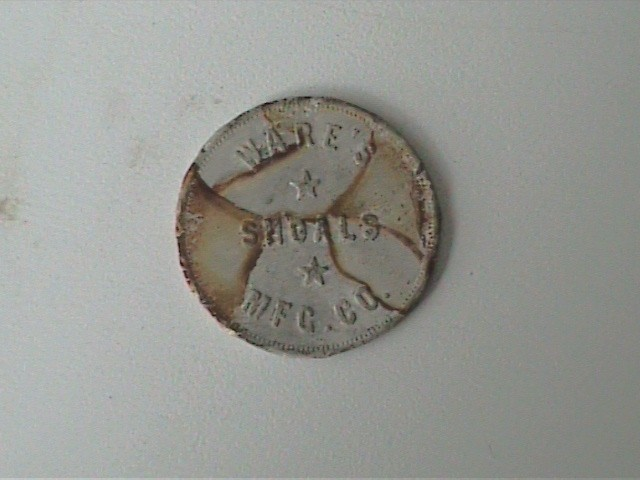
Scrip was used as currency in textile mill towns. It was good for use only in the company store.

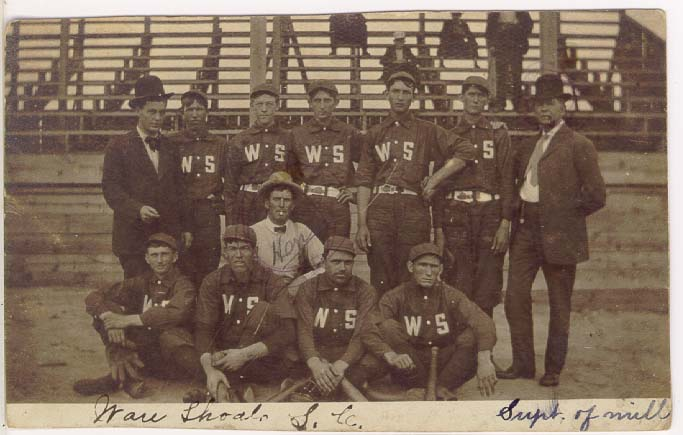
A photo of the Ware Shoals baseball team, circa 1910

Ware Shoals is a town in Abbeville, Greenwood, and Laurens counties in the U.S. state of South Carolina, along the Saluda River. At the 2020 census, the population was 1,701.

The Greenwood County portion of Ware Shoals is part of the Greenwood Micropolitan Statistical Area, while the Laurens County portion is part of the Greenville-Mauldin-Easley Metropolitan Statistical Area.

== Geography ==
According to the United States Census Bureau, the town has a total area of 4.0 square miles (10.4 km^{2}), of which 3.9 square miles (10.1 km^{2}) is land and 0.12 square miles (0.3 km^{2}), or 2.98%, is water.

== Demographics ==
Historical population
Census	Pop.	Note	%±
1970	2,480		—
1980	2,370		−4.4%
1990	2,497		5.4%
2000	2,363		−5.4%
2010	2,170		−8.2%
2020	1,701		−21.6%
2022 (est.)	1,698	▼	−0.2%
U.S. Decennial Census

=== 2020 census ===
Ware Shoals racial composition
Race	Num.	Perc.
White (non-Hispanic)	1,143	67.2%
Black or African American (non-Hispanic)	397	23.34%
Native American	4	0.24%
Asian	9	0.53%
Other/Mixed	101	5.94%
Hispanic or Latino	47	2.76%

As of the 2020 United States census, there were 1,701 people, 977 households, and 633 families residing in the town.

In 2023, all 1,701 residents of Ware Shoals lived in Greenwood County; zero lived in Abbeville County, and zero lived in Laurens County.

=== 2010 census ===
As of the 2010 census, the town of Ware Shoals had a population of 2,170 with 880 households and 572 family households. The population density was 610.1 inhabitants per square mile (235.6/km^{2}). There were 1,126 housing units at an average density of 290.7 per square mile (112.2/km^{2}). The racial makeup of the town was 76.7% White, 20.9% African American, 0.1% Native American, 0.1% Asian, 0.8% from other races, and 1.4% from two or more races. Hispanic or Latino of any race made up 1.4% of the population.

Of Ware Shoals' 880 households, 26.1% had children under the age of 18 living with them. 39.2% were married couples living together, 20.1% had a female householder with no husband present, and 35% were non-families. 31.6% of all households were made up of individuals, and 14.3% had someone living alone who was 65 years of age or older. The average household size was 2.38 and the average family size was 2.96.

The median age of Ware Shoals' residents was 42.2 years old in 2010; 39.7 years for men and 44.6 for women. Ware Shoals, like much of the United States, has a constrictive population pyramid, the result of declining birth rates and increasing life expectancy.

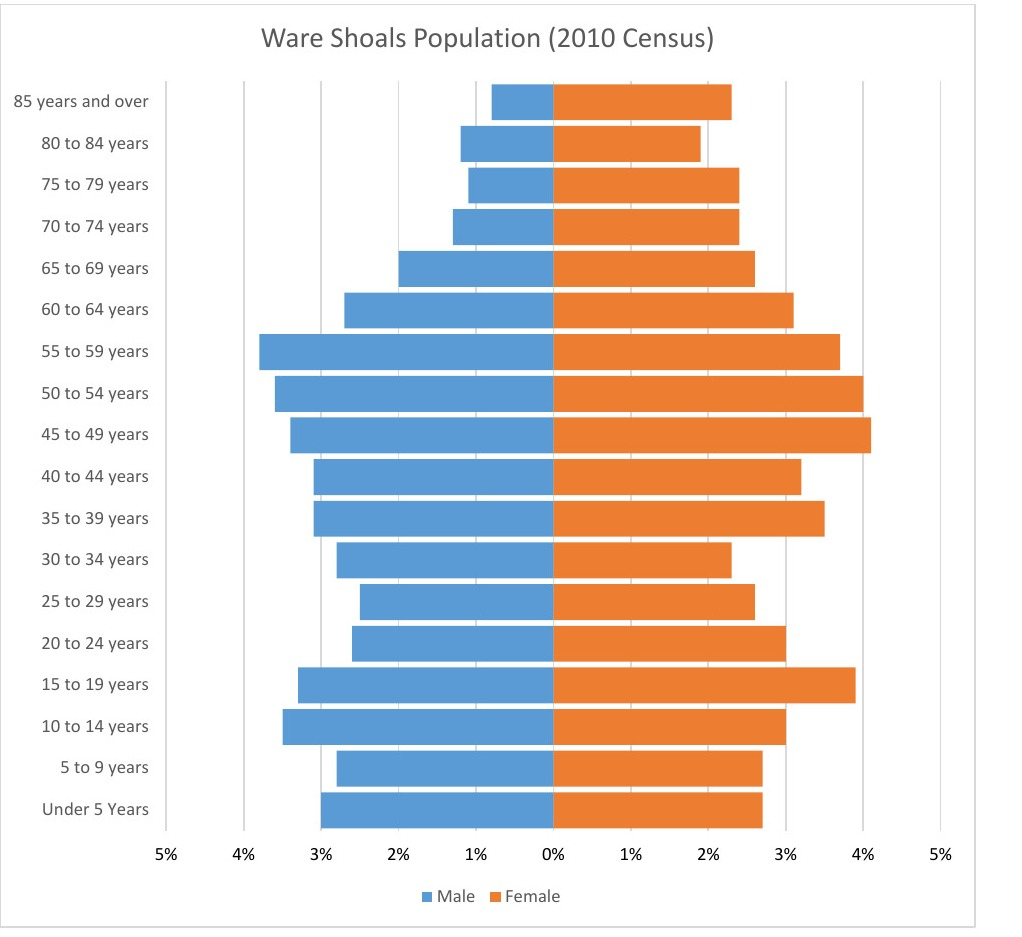
Ware Shoals Population Pyramid (2010 Census)

The median household income in Ware Shoals is $33,650 a year, approximately $25,000 less than the national median of $57,652. 32.1% of the population of Ware Shoals is estimated to live in poverty, far above the national average of 13.1%. Due in part to the high rate of poverty in the community, both Ware Shoals Primary School and Ware Shoals Elementary Middle School are designated as Title I schools.

== History ==
Ware Shoals is the site of an old water wheel gristmill, which William Ware operated in the early 19th century at Rutledge Ford on the Saluda River.

Senator Nathaniel Barksdale Dial of Laurens County envisioned the possibility of damming this river to power a cotton mill. Dial started the project, but ran out of funds before the power plant was completed. Benjamin D. Riegel then bought the project from Dial and founded both the Ware Shoals Manufacturing Company and the town of Ware Shoals in 1902. The construction of a power plant was completed in 1904 as a prelude to the construction of a state-of-the-art textile mill in 1906. That power plant originally provided for 4,800 horse power. The mill contained 30,000 spindles. By 1916 a new mill was constructed containing 70,200 spindles and 1,300 looms.

From 1904 to 1916, the population of Ware Shoals grew from two men employed to maintain the newly constructed power plant to 2,000. By the 1960s the mill employed 5,000 people. The founders of the mill and the original officers of the Ware Shoals Manufacturing Corporation were Benjamin Riegel, president and treasurer; James MacEnroe, assistant treasurer; and R. S. Oliver secretary. MacEnroe was instrumental in the construction of the town's first school at the cost of $20,000. The mill employed the school's eight teachers and required many of its employees and their children to attend classes.

Benjamin Riegel helped organize the town's first church when he brought a Presbyterian preacher, Rev. J.M. Dallas. That first church building was intended as a union church building and the Methodists and Presbyterians used it together, while the Baptists constructed their own facility.

By 1916, the town was as new and modern as any in South Carolina. In addition to the cotton mill and the school, the Ware Shoals Manufacturing Corporation, later known as Riegel Textile Corporation, helped give the town electric lights, water and sewerage and good streets. The mill operated a bank, a railway, an ice factory, a cotton gin and a cotton seed oil mill. A community center was built by the textile company at a cost of $40,000.

"The People's Amusement Hall" is what Benjamin Riegel set out to build, but was so proud of it that he named it the Katherine Hall in honor of his daughter. Katherine Hall at various times housed or hosted a movie theater, the community library, a Masonic Lodge, a pool hall, a teen canteen as well as showers and dressing rooms for the adjacent public swimming pool.

The mill also operated a department store, or company store, as was common in mill towns through the South. The store began as a one-room shanty in 1906. By 1920, a newly constructed store was on its way to becoming one of the best and most modern department stores in the state. There was a soda fountain where the community members socialized, toy department, pharmacy, candy counter, men's shop, ladies' ready-to-wear section, furniture department, bargain basement, grocery store, and cloth shop. The store's motto was "You can buy in one store anything from a paper and pen to a Ford automobile, from a baby girl's rattle to her wedding dress."

In 1926 a large school building was constructed to accommodate the Caucasian students. This building is still used today as the Ware Shoals High School and remains one of the oldest South Carolina school buildings still in use.

Riegel Stadium was built in 1931. The stadium was first used for football games in 1934. Lighting was installed a year later, allowing night games as well. Through the decades, Riegel Stadium has hosted high school teams, textile baseball leagues, and the Negro baseball leagues. In 1954, the stadium hosted an exhibition game between the Cincinnati Red Legs and The Washington Senators.

In 1939 muralist Alice Kindler was commissioned by the WPA to complete a mural for the local post office. The WPA was a New Deal agency that employed individuals to carry out public works projects. The mural was completed in 1940 and titled, American Landscape.

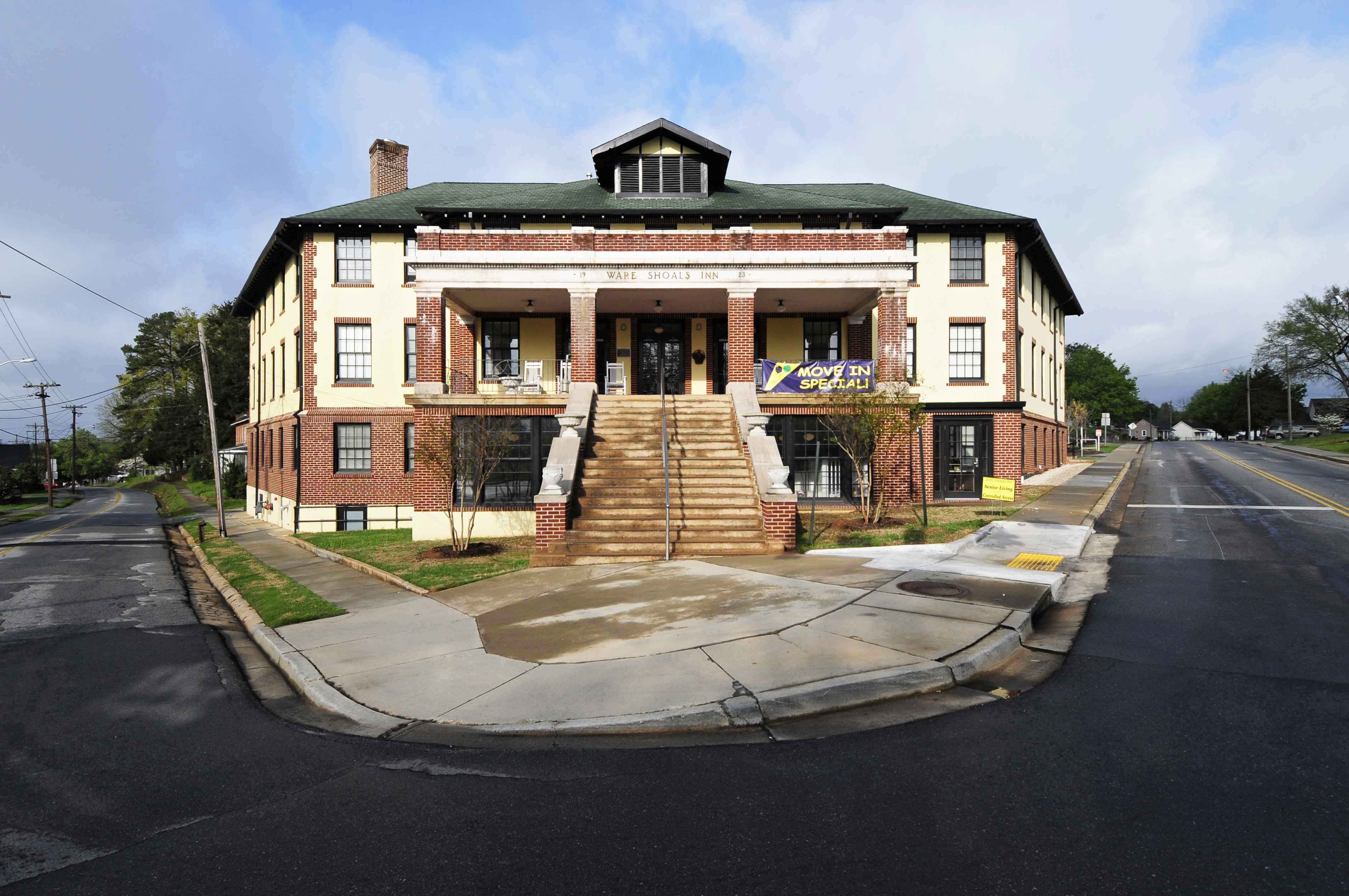

Beginning in the 1940s, "The Big Friendly" began an early shopper loyalty program by conducting a drawing just before Christmas to award an automobile to one lucky patron. "The Big Friendly" remained a central part of life in Ware Shoals until its closing in 1963. It soon became the SEO, or Southern Executive Offices of the Riegel Textile Corporation. With the closing of the mill and the end of Riegel Textile, the town bought the building and located its City Hall in the now-historic building.

In the 1950s, the Emma Maddox School was completed for African American students. Maddox was a stern disciplinarian and much respected teacher and principal. The Emma Maddox Building of the current Ware Shoals Middle School was named in her honor, in recognition of her contributions to the educational, spiritual and civic lives of African Americans in the greater Ware Shoal's area. When public schools were integrated in 1969, Emma Maddox School became the middle school for all students in the community.

Portions of the movie Leatherheads was filmed in Ware Shoals. This was facilitated by Ware Shoals native John Valter, one of the foremost historians of 1920s-era football.

The Ware Shoals Inn was listed on the National Register of Historic Places in 2007.

== Education ==
Ware Shoals is contained within Greenwood School District 51, also known as the Ware Shoals School District. Areas in all three counties are within this school district.

The district is home to Ware Shoals Primary School, Ware Shoals Elementary Middle School, and Ware Shoals High School. The high school is especially unique in that its library serves both the school and the public as a branch of the Greenwood County Library System.

== Notable people ==
- Lou Brissie (1924–2013), pitcher for the Philadelphia Athletics from 1947 to 1951
- Jerry Butler (born 1957), former NFL wide receiver
- Jeff Duncan (born January 7, 1966), member of the U.S. House of Representatives for South Carolina's 3rd congressional district
- John J. Starks (April 15, 1872 – January 4, 1944) 8th president of Benedict College, president of Seneca Institute and Morris College.
