= Joe Azelby =

American football player (born 1962)

No. 50
- Position: Linebacker

Personal information
- Born: March 5, 1962 (age 64); New York City, New York, U.S.
- Listed height: 6 ft 1 in (1.85 m)
- Listed weight: 225 lb (102 kg)

Career information
- High school: Bergen Catholic (Oradell, New Jersey)
- College: Harvard
- NFL draft: 1984: 10th round, 263rd overall pick

Career history
- Buffalo Bills (1984); San Francisco 49ers (1986)*; Indianapolis Colts (1986)*
- * Offseason or practice squad member only

Career NFL statistics
- Fumble recoveries: 1
- Stats at Pro Football Reference

Joseph Kenneth Azelby (born March 5, 1962) is a former a professional American football player who played linebacker for the 1984 season for the Buffalo Bills He was selected by the Bills in the tenth round of the 1984 NFL draft with the 263rd overall pick.

Since then Azelby has gone on to a career at JPMorgan Chase, which he joined after leaving the NFL and where he served as global head of JP Morgan's real asset investment group, overseeing a team of 400 investment professionals investments worth in excess of $60 billion. In the spring of 2017, he joined Apollo Global Management in a similar role. He left Apollo in 2018 after differences with other managers over attracting investors and assembling a team for the real assets division. In March 2019, Azelby was announced as the head of UBS's $100 billion real estate and private markets division.

Raised in Dumont and a graduate of Bergen Catholic High School, Azelby has been a resident of nearby Cresskill.
