= Craig White (American football) =

American football player (born 1961)

Profile
- Position: Wide receiver

Personal information
- Born: October 8, 1961 (age 65); St. Joseph, Missouri, U.S.
- Listed height: 6 ft 1 in (1.85 m)
- Listed weight: 185 lb (84 kg)

Career information
- College: Missouri
- NFL draft: 1984: 11th round, 299th overall pick

Career history
- Buffalo Bills (1984)

Career NFL statistics
- Games: 14
- Receptions: 4
- Receiving yards: 28
- Stats at Pro Football Reference

Craig C. White (born October 8, 1961) is an American former professional football player who was a wide receiver for the Buffalo Bills of the National Football League (NFL) in 1984. He played college football for the Missouri Tigers and was selected by the Bills in the 11th round of the 1984 NFL draft with the 299th overall pick.
