= Ware Shoals High School =

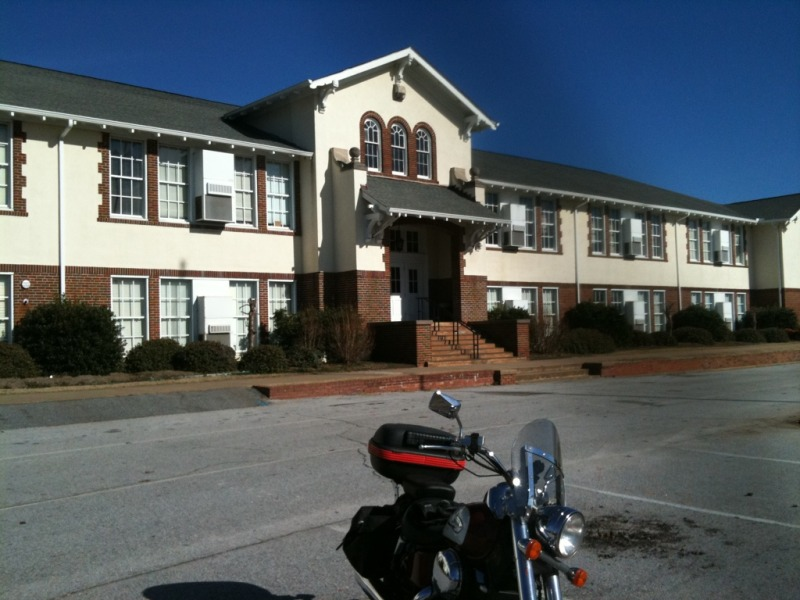

Location
- 56 South Greenwood Avenue; Ware Shoals, Greenwood County, South Carolina 29692; 34.3931°N 82.2385°W

Information
- School type: High School
- Motto: Learning, Serving, Leading
- Established: 1926
- School district: Greenwood School District 51
- Superintendent: Dan Crockett
- Principal: Kathryn Benjamin
- Teaching staff: 19.00 (FTE)
- Grades: 9-12
- Enrollment: 246 (2023-2024)
- Student to teacher ratio: 12.95
- Campus size: 30 acres (12 ha)
- Colors: Purple and Vegas gold
- Nickname: Hornets
- Website: www.gwd51.org

Ware Shoals High School is a public high school located in Ware Shoals, South Carolina that was first built in 1926.

The school serves approximately 260 students and is one of three public schools in the district, Greenwood 51.

== Facilities ==
The "Main Building," built in 1926, was originally built to serve both the employees and children of Riegel Mill in Ware Shoals. Today, the Main Building serves grades 9-12 and houses administrative offices, classrooms, the auditorium, and the cafeteria.

Riegel Stadium, an athletic multiplex completed in 1931, contains football field, baseball field, and Field House. The stadium was one of several South Carolina filming locations for the 2008 movie, Leatherheads. The gymnasium was completed in the 1940s. The Agricultural facilities are currently contained in its basement and side yard.

The Darby Building, which was opened in 1951 to house junior high students, now serves the Greenwood 51 District Office. The band building, finished in 1955, was the last school facility built by the mill. In 1999, the Ware Shoals Community Library was completed. The library serves as the school and community library. This facility was made possible through a combination of private and public funds and was one of the first of its kind in the nation.

== Demographics ==
In 2021, 19% of students were identified as being from a minority ethnic background. 49% of Ware Shoals High School students have been assessed as "economically disadvantaged" based on application for and receipt of free or reduced lunch.
