= Mark Traynowicz =

American football player (born 1962)

No. 62, 66, 76
- Positions: Guard, center

Personal information
- Born: November 20, 1962 (age 63); Omaha, Nebraska, U.S.
- Listed height: 6 ft 5 in (1.96 m)
- Listed weight: 277 lb (126 kg)

Career information
- High school: Bellevue West (Bellevue, Nebraska)
- College: Nebraska
- NFL draft: 1985: 2nd round, 29th overall pick

Career history
- Buffalo Bills (1985–1987); Philadelphia Eagles (1988)*; Buffalo Bills (1988); Phoenix Cardinals (1988); Seattle Seahawks (1989)*; Phoenix Cardinals (1989)
- * Offseason or practice squad member only

Awards and highlights
- Unanimous All-American (1984); 2× First-team All-Big Eight (1983, 1984)

Career NFL statistics
- Games played: 52
- Fumble recoveries: 2
- Stats at Pro Football Reference

Mark Joseph Traynowicz (born November 20, 1962) is an American former professional football player who was an offensive lineman for five seasons in the National Football League (NFL) with the Buffalo Bills and Phoenix Cardinals. He was selected by the Buffalo Bills in the second round of the 1985 NFL draft. Traynowicz played college football for the Nebraska Cornhuskers. He was a unanimous All-American in 1984.

== Early life ==
Traynowicz participated in football, wrestling and track and field at Bellevue West High School in Bellevue, Nebraska, earning nine varsity letters. In 1979, he was a first-team All-State football selection and won the Nebraska Class A state heavyweight wrestling championship with a final record of 29 wins and one loss. He also qualified for the Nebraska State Track and Field Championships in discus in 1980 and shot put from 1978 to 1980.

== College career ==
Traynowicz earned a football scholarship to play for the Cornhuskers at the University of Nebraska–Lincoln. He was named first-team All-Big Eight and first-team Academic All-Big Eight his junior year. He was a first-team unanimous All-American and an Academic All-American his senior year of 1984. Traynowicz was also named first-team All-Big Eight and first-team Academic All-Big Eight for the second time.

== Professional career ==
Traynowiczwas drafted by the Buffalo Bills with the 29th pick in the 1985 NFL Draft. He signed with the Bills in July 1985. He played in 41 games with the Bills from 1985 to 1987.

He was traded to the Philadelphia Eagles for a conditional draft choice in 1989 on August 22, 1988. He was released on August 25, 1988.

Traynowicz appeared in four games for the Buffalo Bills in 1988. He played in seven games with the Phoenix Cardinals from 1988 to 1989.
