= Greg Christy =

American football player (born 1962)

No. 69
- Position: Offensive tackle

Personal information
- Born: April 29, 1962 (age 64); Natrona Heights, Pennsylvania
- Listed height: 6 ft 4 in (1.93 m)
- Listed weight: 285 lb (129 kg)

Career information
- College: Pitt

Career history
- Buffalo Bills (1985)
- Stats at Pro Football Reference

Gregory Alan Christy (born April 29, 1962) is an American former football offensive tackle. He went to the Buffalo Bills in 1985 after being selected by the Baltimore Stars of the USFL in the Territorial Draft. His Bills jersey number was #69. He played in seven NFL games in 1985 with the Bills before suffering a career-ending injury. In his playing days, Christy was 6'4" and 285 pounds. He played for the University of Pittsburgh from 1980 - 1984. His jersey number was #73 for the Panthers where he played in 4 consecutive Bowl games as a tackle. Christy protected Dan Marino during his time at Pitt as well. Christy played high school football for the Freeport Senior High School.
