= Derrick Burroughs =

American football player and coach (born 1962)

Personal information
- Born: May 18, 1962 (age 64); Mobile, Alabama, U.S.
- Listed height: 6 ft 1 in (1.85 m)
- Listed weight: 180 lb (82 kg)

Career information
- High school: Prichard (AL) Blount
- College: Memphis
- NFL draft: 1985: 1st round, 14th overall pick

Career history

Playing
- Buffalo Bills (1985–1989)

Coaching
- Knoxville (1995–1997) Assistant coach; Amsterdam Admirals (1998) Running backs coach; Berlin Thunder (1999) Defensive backs coach; Los Angeles Avengers (2000) Defensive backs coach; Memphis Maniax (2001) Secondary coach; Clark Atlanta (2006) Defensive coordinator; Stillman (2007) Defensive backs coach; Alabama State (2008) Defensive backs coach; New York Sentinels (2009) Administrative assistant & defensive assistant; Lane (2010–2013) Head coach; Jackson State (2014–2015) Assistant head coach & defensive coordinator; Lane (2015–2019) Head coach

Operations
- Lane (2015–2025) Athletic director

Awards and highlights
- PFWA All-Rookie Team (1985); First-team All-South Independent (1984)

Career NFL statistics
- Interceptions: 6
- Fumble recoveries: 3
- Sacks: 1
- Stats at Pro Football Reference

Derrick D'wayne Burroughs (born May 18, 1962) is an American football coach and former cornerback who played five seasons in the National Football League (NFL) for the Buffalo Bills. He was drafted by the Bills in the first round of the 1985 NFL Draft with the 14th overall pick. He served two stints as the head football coach at Lane College, from 2010 to 2013 and 2015 to 2019.

== Coaching career ==
Burroughs began his coaching career in 1995 as assistant head coach and defensive coordinator for Knoxville College. Three years later, he joined the Amsterdam Admirals of NFL Europe in the role of running backs coach. Burroughs became the defensive backs coach of the Berlin Thunder in 1999. He served in a similar capacity with the Los Angeles Avengers of the Arena Football League (2000) and Memphis Maniax of the XFL (2001). After four years in private business he returned to coaching in 2006 as defensive coordinator and defensive backs coach at Clark Atlanta. In 2007, he was the defensive backs coach at Stillman College. Burroughs spent 2008 in the same role at Alabama State University. On February 6, 2010, Burroughs became the head football coach at Lane College. He returned to Lane in 2015 after a one-year stint at Jackson State University.

== Head coaching record ==
Year	Team	Overall	Conference	Standing	Bowl/playoffs
Lane Dragons (Southern Intercollegiate Athletic Conference) (2010–2013)
2010	Lane	0–10	0–9	9th	
2011	Lane	4–6	2–5	4th (West)	
2012	Lane	5–5	3–4	3rd (West)	
2013	Lane	7–3	3–2	3rd (West)	
Lane Dragons (Southern Intercollegiate Athletic Conference) (2015–2019)
2015	Lane	3–7	1–4	5th (West)	
2016	Lane	5–5	3–4	4th (West)	
2017	Lane	2–8	1–5	4th (West)	
2018	Lane	3–6	2–4	4th (West)	
2019	Lane	4–6	2–4	T–4th (West)	
Lane:		33–56	17–41		
Total:		33–56			
