= Mike Hamby =

American football player (born 1962)

No. 75
- Position: Defensive end

Personal information
- Born: November 12, 1962 (age 63); Salt Lake City, Utah, U.S.
- Listed height: 6 ft 0 in (1.83 m)
- Listed weight: 270 lb (122 kg)

Career information
- High school: Levi (Lehi, Utah)
- College: Utah State
- NFL draft: 1985: 6th round, 141st overall pick

Career history
- Buffalo Bills (1986)

Career NFL statistics
- Sacks: 1
- Fumble recoveries: 1
- Stats at Pro Football Reference

Mike Hamby (born November 12, 1962) is an American former professional football player who was a defensive end for the Buffalo Bills of the National Football League (NFL) in 1986. He played college football for the Utah State Aggies and was selected by the Bills in the sixth round of the 1985 NFL draft.
