= Don Smith (defensive lineman) =

American football player (born 1957)

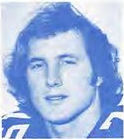
- Smith in 1976

No. 65, 74
- Position: Defensive end

Personal information
- Born: May 9, 1957 (age 69); Oakland, California, U.S.
- Listed height: 6 ft 5 in (1.96 m)
- Listed weight: 256 lb (116 kg)

Career information
- High school: Tarpon Springs (FL)
- College: Miami (FL)
- NFL draft: 1979: 1st round, 17th overall pick

Career history
- Atlanta Falcons (1979–1984); Buffalo Bills (1985–1986); New York Jets (1987)

Awards and highlights
- First-team All-American (1978)

Career NFL statistics
- Sacks: 40.5
- Fumble recoveries: 11
- Stats at Pro Football Reference

Donald Loren Smith (born May 9, 1957) is an American former professional football player who was a defensive lineman in the National Football League (NFL) for the Atlanta Falcons, the Buffalo Bills, and the New York Jets. He played college football at the University of Miami.
