= Robb Riddick =

American football player (born 1957)

No. 40
- Position: Running back

Personal information
- Born: April 26, 1957 (age 69); Quakertown, Pennsylvania, U.S.
- Listed height: 6 ft 0 in (1.83 m)
- Listed weight: 195 lb (88 kg)

Career information
- High school: Perkasie (PA) Pennridge
- College: Millersville
- NFL draft: 1981: 9th round, 241st overall pick

Career history
- Buffalo Bills (1981–1990)

Career NFL statistics
- Rushing yards: 1,341
- Rushing average: 4.1
- Rushing touchdowns: 21
- Stats at Pro Football Reference

Robbert Lee Riddick (born April 26, 1957) is an American former professional football player who was a running back for the Buffalo Bills of the National Football League (NFL). He played college football for the Millersville Marauders as a running back and defensive back. He set numerous of the school's records in football as well as track and field. Riddick was selected by the Bills in the ninth round, 241st overall, of the 1981 NFL draft.

Riddick played six seasons for the Bills. He started eight games and ran for 632 total yards in 1986, and he became a short-yardage specialist in 1988. He sat out the 1982 and 1985 seasons after sustaining injuries to his right knee during training camp.

Riddick's first 100-yard rushing game of his career helped Hall of Fame coach Marv Levy record his first win as the Bills new coach on November 9, 1986.

Because of his high-jumping ability, Riddick became a short-yardage weapon for the Bills in 1988. He scored 12 rushing touchdowns, all but three of which were from the opponent's 1-yard line; the longest of his rushing touchdowns was five yards. He added one TD reception and a blocked punt returned for a touchdown in the regular season plus one rushing TD in the Bills' playoff win over the Houston Oilers in the 1988 AFC Divisional Playoff Game to total 15 TDs that year, his final season of his NFL career.

He suffered what turned out to be a career-ending knee injury in the 1989 preseason finale against the Atlanta Falcons.

Riddick's oldest son, Ian Riddick, played defensive back at the University of Pittsburgh. His youngest son, Andre Riddick, played for Ohio State University. His daughter, Gabrielle Riddick, is a high academic achiever and plays the upright bass.

Before attending Millersville, Riddick went to Pennridge High School, where he was an outstanding football player. Riddick is from an accomplished family of other professional football players. His brother is former NFL safety and current ESPN broadcaster Louis Riddick. His cousins, Will Lewis and Tim Lewis, also played in the NFL and currently hold management positions for professional football teams.

He struggled with financial problems after retiring from the NFL. In 1994, unemployed and facing debt of $340,000, he filed bankruptcy.

As of 2020, Riddick worked in Atlanta as a fitness instructor.

In 2021, he was named to the first class of Millersville University's Wall of Honor.

== See also ==
- Robb Riddick at Pro Football Reference
