= Terry Bledsoe =

American sportswriter and football executive (1934–2015)

Profile
- Position: General Manager/Assistant General Manager

Personal information
- Born: August 4, 1934; Chicago, Illinois, U.S.
- Died: December 12, 2015 (aged 81); Providence, Rhode Island, U.S.

Career history
- New York Giants (1979-1983) Assistant Manager; Buffalo Bills (1984-1985) General Manager/VP
- Executive profile at Pro Football Reference

Truman Claudius Bledsoe III (August 4, 1934 – December 12, 2015) was a sportswriter and NFL executive. He was a sportswriter at the Milwaukee Journal for many years. He covered the Green Bay Packers from 1962 to 1968. He was the beat writer for Marquette basketball and Al McGuire from 1962 to 1973. In 1973, he got a public relations job for the NFL Management council. In 1979, Bledsoe became an assistant general manager for the New York Giants. In 1984, he became the general manager for the Buffalo Bills. He was there for two seasons. After two consecutive years of going 2–14, he was fired. He later had senior management positions for the Cleveland Browns and Arizona Cardinals. He was married to his wife Shirley for 59 years until his death, and he had six children. Bledsoe died on December 12, 2015, at the age of 81.
