= Eric Richardson (American football) =

American football player (born 1962)

No. 82
- Position: Wide receiver

Personal information
- Born: April 18, 1962 (age 64); San Francisco, California, U.S.
- Listed height: 6 ft 1 in (1.85 m)
- Listed weight: 183 lb (83 kg)

Career information
- High school: Novato (California)
- College: San Jose State
- NFL draft: 1984: 2nd round, 41st overall pick

Career history
- Buffalo Bills (1985–1986); San Francisco 49ers (1988)*
- * Offseason or practice squad member only

Awards and highlights
- Second-team All-American (1983)

Career NFL statistics
- Receptions: 15
- Receiving yards: 250
- Return yards: 192
- Stats at Pro Football Reference

Eric E. Richardson (born April 18, 1962) is an American former professional football player who was a wide receiver in the National Football League (NFL).

Richardson was born in San Francisco, California and played scholastically at Novato High School, in the North Bay region. He began his college football career at Monterey Peninsula College, before finishing with the San Jose State Spartans. As a senior, he was honored by the Newspaper Enterprise Association (NEA) as a second-team All-American.

Richardson was selected by the Buffalo Bills in the second round of the 1984 NFL draft. He played in 30 games and started 2 of them. Even though he was drafted in 1984, he played his first game in 1985.
