= Mitchell Brookins =

American football player (1960–1993)

No. 81
- Position: Wide receiver

Personal information
- Born: December 10, 1960; Chicago, Illinois, U.S.
- Died: July 20, 1993 (aged 32)
- Listed height: 5 ft 11 in (1.80 m)
- Listed weight: 196 lb (89 kg)

Career information
- High school: Wendell Phillips (Chicago, Illinois)
- College: Illinois
- NFL draft: 1984: 4th round, 95th overall pick

Career history
- Buffalo Bills (1984–1985); Los Angeles Raiders (1987)*; San Diego Chargers (1988)*
- * Offseason or practice squad member only

Career NFL statistics
- Receptions: 21
- Receiving yards: 389
- Touchdowns: 1
- Stats at Pro Football Reference

Mitchell Brookins (December 12, 1960 – July 20, 1993) was an American wide receiver for the Buffalo Bills. He played college football for Illinois. Brookins was selected by the Bills in the fourth round of the 1984 NFL draft with the 95th overall pick. He played 21 games and 1 start.
