= Rodney Bellinger =

American football player (born 1962)

No. 36
- Position: Cornerback

Personal information
- Born: June 4, 1962 (age 64); Miami, Florida, U.S.
- Listed height: 5 ft 8 in (1.73 m)
- Listed weight: 186 lb (84 kg)

Career information
- High school: Coral Gables (Coral Gables, Florida)
- College: Miami (FL)
- NFL draft: 1984: 3rd round, 77th overall pick

Career history
- Buffalo Bills (1984–1986); Cleveland Browns (1988)*; Tampa Bay Buccaneers (1988)*
- * Offseason or practice squad member only

Awards and highlights
- National champion (1983); Second-team All-South Independent (1983)

Career NFL statistics
- Interceptions: 4
- Fumble recoveries: 5
- Touchdowns: 1
- Stats at Pro Football Reference

Rodney Carwell Bellinger (born June 4, 1962) is an American former professional football player who spent three seasons in the National Football League (NFL) with the Buffalo Bills after being drafted by them in the third round of the 1984 NFL draft with the 77th overall pick. He played in 42 games and started 11 at cornerback. He went to college at Miami. He has recorded 3 interceptions for 78 yards.

== Professional career ==
Bellinger signed with the Buffalo Bills on July 12, 1984.
