= Tim Vogler =

American football player (born 1956)

No. 65
- Position: Offensive guard

Personal information
- Born: December 20, 1956 (age 69); Covington, Ohio
- Listed height: 6 ft 3 in (1.91 m)
- Listed weight: 259 lb (117 kg)

Career information
- High school: Covington
- College: Ohio State
- NFL draft: 1979: undrafted

Career history
- Buffalo Bills (1979–1989)

Awards and highlights
- Ralph C Wilson Distinguished Service Award (1990)
- Stats at Pro Football Reference

Timothy Gene Vogler (born December 20, 1956, in Troy, Ohio) is a retired American football guard who played in the National Football League for the Buffalo Bills. He played college football at Ohio State University.

Vogler was not selected in the 1979 NFL draft, but signed with the Bills later that year. Initially a reserve, he became a full-time starter with the Bills by 1985, when he started 14 games. Although he also filled in at center on occasion, Vogler spent much of the next four seasons as Buffalo's starter at right guard. Vogler suffered a knee injury that forced him to miss the Bills' run to the 1989 AFC Championship. After knee surgery during the off-season, Vogler's Buffalo career ended after the 1989 preseason when he was placed on the physically unable to perform list.
