= Lawrence Johnson (American football) =

American football player (born 1957)

No. 48
- Position: Cornerback

Personal information
- Born: September 11, 1957 (age 69); Gary, Indiana, U.S.
- Listed height: 5 ft 11 in (1.80 m)
- Listed weight: 204 lb (93 kg)

Career information
- High school: Theodore Roosevelt (Gary)
- College: Wisconsin
- NFL draft: 1979: 2nd round, 40th overall pick

Career history
- Cleveland Browns (1979–1984); Buffalo Bills (1984–1988)

Awards and highlights
- Second-team All-Big Ten (1977)

Career NFL statistics
- Interceptions: 9
- Fumble recoveries: 2
- Sacks: 1.5
- Stats at Pro Football Reference

Lawrence Johnson (born September 11, 1957) is an American former professional football player who was a cornerback for nine seasons in the National Football League (NFL) for the Cleveland Browns and the Buffalo Bills. He played college football for the Wisconsin Badgers.

== Personal life ==
His son L.O. Johnson competes as a sprinter.
