= Sean McNanie =

American football player (born 1961)

No. 95, 90
- Position: Defensive end

Personal information
- Born: September 9, 1961 (age 65); Mundelein, Illinois, U.S.
- Listed height: 6 ft 5 in (1.96 m)
- Listed weight: 250 lb (113 kg)

Career information
- College: Arizona State; San Diego State
- NFL draft: 1984: 3rd round, 79th overall pick

Career history
- Buffalo Bills (1984–1987); Phoenix Cardinals (1988); Indianapolis Colts (1990)

Career NFL statistics
- Sacks: 15
- Fumble recoveries: 2
- Touchdowns: 1
- Stats at Pro Football Reference

Sean Lawrence McNanie (born September 9, 1961) is an American former professional football player who was a defensive end for six seasons for the Buffalo Bills, Arizona Cardinals, and Indianapolis Colts. He was selected by the Bills in the third round of the 1984 NFL draft with the 79th overall pick. In 1987, He scored a fumble recovery touchdown in a 13–12 loss to the New England Patriots.
