= Dean Prater =

American football player (1958–1996)

No. 79
- Position: Defensive end

Personal information
- Born: September 28, 1958; Altus, Oklahoma, U.S.
- Died: March 14, 1996 (aged 37); Horseheads, New York, U.S.
- Listed height: 6 ft 5 in (1.96 m)
- Listed weight: 225 lb (102 kg)

Career information
- High school: S. H. Rider (Wichita Falls, Texas)
- College: Oklahoma State
- NFL draft: 1981: 10th round, 271st overall pick

Career history
- Cleveland Browns (1981)*; Kansas City Chiefs (1982–1983); Buffalo Bills (1984–1988)
- * Offseason or practice squad member only

Awards and highlights
- First-team All-Big Eight (1980)

Career NFL statistics
- Sacks: 1
- Fumble recoveries: 1
- Stats at Pro Football Reference

Troy Dean Prater (September 28, 1958 – March 14, 1996) was an American professional football player for the Buffalo Bills and Kansas City Chiefs who played defensive end for seven seasons. Authorities said Prater slipped in the bath tub, suffered a severe blow to the head and was knocked unconscious. His body apparently plugged the drain, causing the tub to fill with water. He may have had an epileptic seizure and been knocked unconscious; his daughter has epilepsy.
