= Eugene Marve =

American football player (1960–2021)

No. 54, 99
- Position: Linebacker

Personal information
- Born: August 14, 1960; Flint, Michigan, U.S.
- Died: May 24, 2021 (aged 60)
- Listed height: 6 ft 2 in (1.88 m)
- Listed weight: 230 lb (104 kg)

Career information
- High school: Flint Northern (Flint, Michigan)
- College: Saginaw Valley State
- NFL draft: 1982: 3rd round, 59th overall pick

Career history
- Buffalo Bills (1982–1987); Tampa Bay Buccaneers (1988–1991); San Diego Chargers (1992)

Career NFL statistics
- Sacks: 8
- Interceptions: 3
- Fumble recoveries: 8
- Stats at Pro Football Reference

Eugene Raymond Marve (August 14, 1960 – May 24, 2021) was an American professional football player who was a linebacker in the National Football League (NFL) for the Buffalo Bills, Tampa Bay Buccaneers, and the San Diego Chargers. He played college football at Saginaw Valley State University and became the first player from the school to play in the NFL. He was inducted into the SVSU Cardinal Athletic Hall of Fame as a member of its inaugural class in 2010.

Marve led the Bills in tackles in a season three times. He was traded by Buffalo to Tampa Bay in exchange for an 8th round draft pick.

His son, Robert Marve, won the Florida Mr. Football Award in 2007 and was the starting quarterback at the University of Miami, before transferring to Purdue University.

He died on May 24, 2021, at the age of 60, after a brief hospital stay. He had a wife, Stacey, a son, Robert, and a daughter, Rebecca.
