= List of UNLV Rebels football seasons =

This is a list of seasons completed by the UNLV Rebels football team of the National Collegiate Athletic Association (NCAA) Division I Football Bowl Subdivision (FBS). UNLV's first football team was fielded in 1968.

UNLV football began in 1968. After spending time in the Big West Conference between 1982 and 1995, and the Western Athletic Conference between 1996 and 1998, the Rebels joined the Mountain West Conference as one of the founding members in 1999, of which it has been a member since.

== Seasons ==
Year	Coach	Overall	Conference	Standing	Bowl/playoffs	Coaches^{#}	AP^{°}
Bill Ireland (Independent) (1968–1972)
1968	Nevada Southern	8–1					
1969	UNLV	6–4					
1970	UNLV	6–4					
1971	UNLV	5–4–1					
1972	UNLV	1–10					
Ron Meyer (Div. II Independent) (1973–1975)
1973	UNLV	8–3					
1974	UNLV	12–1			L NCAA Division II Semifinal		
1975	UNLV	7–4					
Tony Knap (Div. II Independent) (1976–1977)
1976	UNLV	9–3			L NCAA Division II Quarterfinal		
1977	UNLV	9–2					
Tony Knap (I-A Independent) (1978–1981)
1978	UNLV	7–4					
1979	UNLV	9–1–2					
1980	UNLV	7–4					
1981	UNLV	6–6					
Harvey Hyde (PCAA) (1982–1985)
1982	UNLV	3–8	1–4	6th			
1983	UNLV	0–11^{[A]}	0–6	7th			
1984	UNLV	0–13^{[A]}	0–7	8th	L California^{[A]}		
1985	UNLV	5–5–1	4–2–1	3rd			
Wayne Nunnely (PCAA/Big West Conference) (1986–1989)
1986	UNLV	6–5	3–4	T–4th			
1987	UNLV	5–6	4–3	T–2nd			
1988	UNLV	4–7	3–4	T–5th			
1989	UNLV	4–7	3–4	5th			
Jim Strong (Big West Conference) (1990–1993)
1990	UNLV	4–7	3–4	5th			
1991	UNLV	4–7	2–5	T–5th			
1992	UNLV	6–5	3–3	T–4th			
1993	UNLV	3–8	2–4	T–6th			
Jeff Horton (Big West Conference) (1994–1995)
1994	UNLV	7–5	5–1	T–2nd	W Las Vegas		
1995	UNLV	2–9	1–5	10th			
Jeff Horton (Western Athletic Conference) (1996–1998)
1996	UNLV	1–11	1–8	8th (Pacific)			
1997	UNLV	3–8	2–6	7th (Pacific)			
1998	UNLV	0–11	0–8	8th (Mountain)			
John Robinson (Mountain West Conference) (1999–2004)
1999	UNLV	3–8	1–6	8th			
2000	UNLV	8–5	4–3	T–3rd	W Las Vegas		
2001	UNLV	4–7	3–4	6th			
2002	UNLV	5–7	3–4	T–5th			
2003	UNLV	6–6	2–5	T–7th			
2004	UNLV	2–9	1–6	8th			
Mike Sanford Sr. (Mountain West Conference) (2005–2009)
2005	UNLV	2–9	1–7	9th			
2006	UNLV	2–10	1–7	T–8th			
2007	UNLV	2–10	1–7	9th			
2008	UNLV	5–7	2–6	T–6th			
2009	UNLV	5–7	3–5	6th			
Bobby Hauck (Mountain West Conference) (2010–2014)
2010	UNLV	2–11	2–6	T–6th			
2011	UNLV	2–10	1–6	T–6th			
2012	UNLV	2–11	2–6	8th			
2013	UNLV	7–6	5–3	T–3rd (West)	L Heart of Dallas		
2014	UNLV	2–11	1–7	6th (West)			
Tony Sanchez (Mountain West Conference) (2015–2019)
2015	UNLV	3–9	2–6	T–4th (West)			
2016	UNLV	4–8	3–5	T–3rd (West)			
2017	UNLV	5–7	4–4	T–3rd (West)			
2018	UNLV	4–8	2–6	5th (West)			
2019	UNLV	4–8	2–6	5th (West)			
Marcus Arroyo (Mountain West Conference) (2020–2022)
2020	UNLV	0–6	0–6	12th			
2021	UNLV	2–10	2–6	6th (West)			
2022	UNLV	5–7	3–5	4th (West)			
Barry Odom (Mountain West Conference) (2023–2024)
2023	UNLV	9–5	6–2	T–1st	L Guaranteed Rate		
2024	UNLV	11–3	6–1	T–2nd	W LA	24	23
Dan Mullen (Mountain West Conference) (2025–present)
2025	UNLV	10–4	6–2	T–1st	L Frisco		
Total:		279–383–4					
National championship Conference title Conference division title or championship game berth
^{#}Rankings from final Coaches Poll.

== Notes ==
- ^{A} In March 1985, the NCAA ruled UNLV to forfeit all of its victories from their 1983 and 1984 seasons due to playing with ineligible players, including 7 wins in 1983 and 11 wins in 1984 as well as the 1984 California Bowl.
