= List of UNLV Rebels head football coaches =

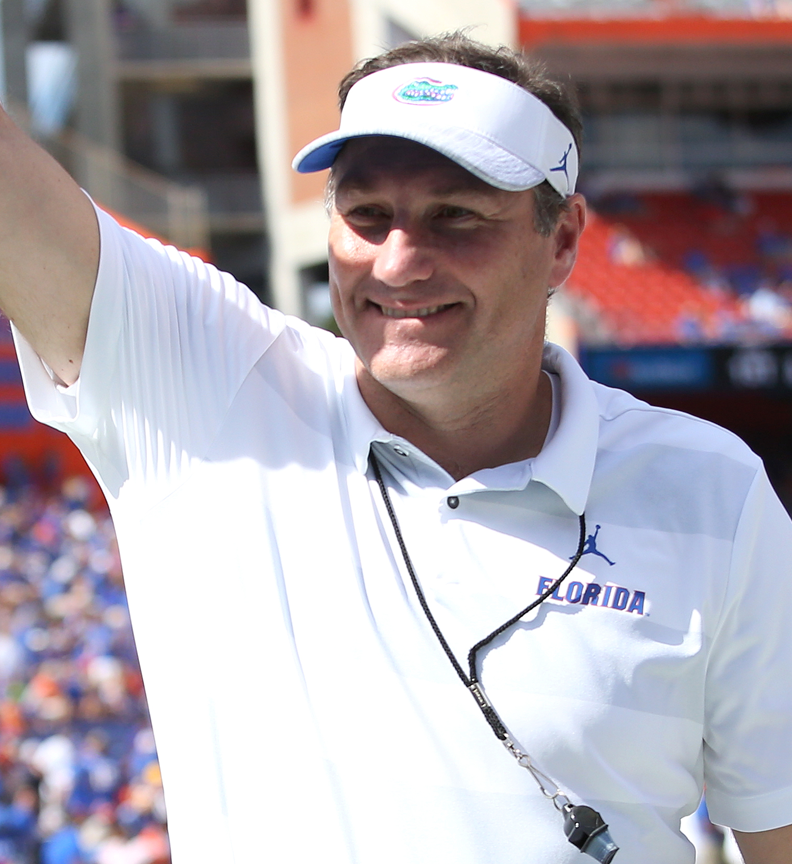
Dan Mullen has served as head coach of the Rebels since December 2024.

The UNLV Rebels college football team represents the University of Nevada, Las Vegas (UNLV) in the Mountain West Conference (MW). The Rebels compete as part of the NCAA Division I Football Bowl Subdivision. The program has had 14 head coaches and oneinterim head coach since it began play during the 1968 season. Since December 2024, Dan Mullen has served as head coach at UNLV.

Seven coaches have led UNLV in playoff or postseason bowl games: Tony Knap, Harvey Hyde, Jeff Horton, John Robinson, Bobby Hauck, Barry Odom, and Del Alexander. Two of those coaches also won conference championships: Hyde captured one as a member of the Pacific Coast Athletic Association; and Horton captured one as a member of the Big West Conference.

Knap and Robinson are the leaders in seasons coached with six years as head coach each. Knap is the leader in games won with 47. Ron Meyer has the highest winning percentage at 0.771. Hyde has the lowest winning percentage of those who have coached more than one game, with 0.185. Of the 13 different head coaches who have led the Rebels, Robinson has been inducted into the College Football Hall of Fame.

== Key ==
Key to symbols in coaches list
General		Overall		Conference		Postseason (Note: Although the first Rose Bowl Game was played in 1902, it has been continuously played since the 1916 game, and is recognized as the oldest bowl game by the NCAA. "—" indicates any season prior to 1916 when postseason games were not played.)	
No.	Order of coaches (Note: A running total of the number of head coaches, with coaches who served separate tenures being counted only once. Interim head coaches are represented with "Int" and are not counted in the running total. "—" indicates the team played but either without a coach or no coach is on record. "X" indicates an interim year without play.)	GC	Games coached	CW	Conference wins	PW	Postseason wins
DC	Division championships	OW	Overall wins	CL	Conference losses	PL	Postseason losses
CC	Conference championships	OL	Overall losses	CT	Conference ties	PT	Postseason ties
NC	National championships	OT	Overall ties (Note: Overtime rules in college football were introduced in 1996, making ties impossible in the period since.)	C%	Conference winning percentage		
†	Elected to the College Football Hall of Fame	O%	Overall winning percentage (Note: When computing the win–loss percentage, a tie counts as half a win and half a loss.)				

== Coaches ==
List of head football coaches showing season(s) coached, overall records, conference records, postseason records, championships and selected awards (Note: Statistics correct as of the end of the 2025 NCAA Division I FBS football season.)
No.	Name	Season(s)	GC	OW	OL	OT	O%	CW	CL	CT	C%	PW	PL	PT	CC	NC	Awards
1	Bill Ireland	1968–1972	50	26	23	1	0.530	—	—	—	—	—	—	—	—	—	—
2	Ron Meyer	1973–1975	35	27	8	0	0.771	—	—	—	—	—	—	—	—	—	—
3	Tony Knap	1976–1981	69	47	20	2	0.696	—	—	—	—	0	1	0	0	—	—
4	Harvey Hyde (Note: The 1983 and 1984 seasons, including the 1984 California Bowl, forfeited due to ineligible players. The on-field record for 1983 was 7–4 (4–2 PCAA); 1984 was 11–2 (7–0 PCAA).)	1982–1985	46	8	37	1	0.185	5	19	1	0.220	0	1	0	1	—	—
5	Wayne Nunnely	1986–1989	44	19	25	0	0.432	13	15	0	0.464	0	0	0	0	—	—
6	Jim Strong	1990–1993	44	17	27	0	0.386	10	16	0	0.385	0	0	0	0	—	—
7	Jeff Horton	1994–1998	57	13	44	0	0.228	9	29	0	0.237	1	0	0	1	—	—
8	John Robinson^{†}	1999–2004	70	28	42	—	0.400	14	28	—	0.333	1	0	—	0	—	—
9	Mike Sanford Sr.	2005–2009	59	16	43	—	0.271	8	32	—	0.200	0	0	—	0	—	—
10	Bobby Hauck	2010–2014	64	15	49	—	0.234	11	28	—	0.282	0	1	—	0	—	—
11	Tony Sanchez	2015–2019	60	20	40	—	0.333	13	27	—	0.325	0	0	—	0	—	—
12	Marcus Arroyo	2020–2022	30	7	23	—	0.233	5	17	—	0.227	0	0	—	0	—	—
13	Barry Odom	2023–2024	27	19	8	—	0.704	12	3	—	0.800	0	1	—	0	—	—
Int.	Del Alexander (Note: Del Alexander was named interim head coach for the 2024 LA Bowl, following the departure of Barry Odom as head coach.)	2024	1	1	0	—	1.000	0	0	—	–	1	0	—	0	0	—
14	Dan Mullen	2025–present	14	10	4	—	0.714	6	2	—	0.750	0	1	—	0	0	—
