= List of Cal State Fullerton Titans football seasons =

This is a list of seasons completed by the Cal State Fullerton Titans football team.

== Seasons ==
Conference champions *	Bowl game berth ^

Season	Head coach	Conference	Season results				Bowl result
Season	Head coach	Conference	Conference finish	Wins	Losses	Ties	Bowl result
Cal State Fullerton Titans
1970	Dick Coury	California Collegiate Athletic Association	—	6	4	1	—
1971	Dick Coury	California Collegiate Athletic Association	—	7	4	0	Lost 1971 Mercy Bowl to Fresno State Bulldogs, 14–17 ^
1972	Pete Yoder	California Collegiate Athletic Association	—	7	4	0	—
1973	Pete Yoder	California Collegiate Athletic Association	—	7	4	0	—
1974	Pete Yoder	Big West Conference	—	4	7	0	—
1975	Jim Colletto	Big West Conference	—	2	9	0	—
1976	Jim Colletto	Big West Conference	—	3	7	1	—
1977	Jim Colletto	Big West Conference	—	4	7	0	—
1978	Jim Colletto	Big West Conference	—	5	7	0	—
1979	Jim Colletto	Big West Conference	—	3	8	0	—
1980	Gene Murphy	Big West Conference	—	4	7	0	—
1981	Gene Murphy	Big West Conference	—	3	8	0	—
1982	Gene Murphy	Big West Conference	—	3	9	0	—
1983 *	Gene Murphy	Big West Conference	—	7	5	0	Lost 1983 California Bowl to Northern Illinois Huskies, 13–20 ^
1984 *	Gene Murphy	Big West Conference	—	11	1	0	—
1985	Gene Murphy	Big West Conference	—	6	5	0	—
1986	Gene Murphy	Big West Conference	—	3	9	0	—
1987	Gene Murphy	Big West Conference	—	6	6	0	—
1988	Gene Murphy	Big West Conference	—	5	6	0	—
1989	Gene Murphy	Big West Conference	—	6	4	1	—
1990	Gene Murphy	Big West Conference	—	1	11	0	—
1991	Gene Murphy	Big West Conference	—	2	9	0	—
1992	Gene Murphy	Independent	—	2	9	0	—
Total				107	148	3	(only includes regular season games)
Total				0	2	0	(only includes bowl games)
Total				107	150	3	(all games)
