= 1983 Nevada Wolf Pack football team =

American college football season

1983 Nevada Wolf Pack football

Big Sky champion

NCAA Division I-AA Semifinal, L 7–23 vs. Southern Illinois
- Conference: Big Sky Conference

Ranking
- AP: No. 11
- Record: 10–4 (Note: In 1985, UNLV was forced to forfeit all 7 wins from the 1983 season and all 11 wins from the 1984 season, including their victory in the California Bowl. Ault and his team were given a win and the Fremont Cannon as a result. See Wikipedia:WikiProject College football/Vacated victories for an explanation of how vacated victories are recorded.) (6–1 Big Sky)
- Head coach: Chris Ault (8th season)
- Defensive coordinator: Bill Miller (1st season)
- Home stadium: Mackay Stadium

1983 Big Sky Conference football standings
	Conf.					Overall
Team	W		L		T	W		L		T
No. 11 Nevada * $^	6	–	1	–	0	10	–	4	–	0
No. 12 Idaho State ^	5	–	2	–	0	8	–	4	–	0
Idaho	4	–	3	–	0	8	–	3	–	0
Boise State	4	–	3	–	0	6	–	5	–	0
Weber State	3	–	4	–	0	6	–	5	–	0
Montana	3	–	4	–	0	4	–	6	–	0
Northern Arizona	2	–	5	–	0	4	–	7	–	0
Montana State	1	–	6	–	0	1	–	10	–	0
$ – Conference champion; ^ – NCAA Division I-AA playoff participant; * – Nevada was given a win on the Fremont Cannon after UNLV was forced to forfeit the game after an investigation found that ineligible players had participated in the 1983 and 1984 seasons.; Rankings from NCAA Division I-AA Poll

The 1983 Nevada Wolf Pack football team represented the University of Nevada, Reno during the 1983 NCAA Division I-AA football season. Nevada competed as a member of the Big Sky Conference (BSC). The Wolf Pack were led by eighth-year head coach Chris Ault and played their home games at Mackay Stadium.

== Schedule ==
Date	Opponent	Rank	Site	Result	Attendance	Source
September 3	at UNLV*		Las Vegas Silver Bowl; East Las Vegas, NV (Fremont Cannon)	W 18–28 (forfeit)	16,168	
September 17	at Fresno State*		Bulldog Stadium; Fresno, CA	L 22–24	27,705	
September 24	Boise State		Mackay Stadium; Reno, NV (rivalry)	W 38–20	13,110	
October 1	No. 8 Idaho State		Mackay Stadium; Reno, NV	W 37–16	9,324	
October 8	Cal State Fullerton*		Mackay Stadium; Reno, NV	L 6–14	9,050	
October 15	at Montana		Dornblaser Field; Missoula, MT	W 38–0	11,020	
October 22	Weber State^{†}	No. 16	Mackay Stadium; Reno, NV	W 41–3	12,258	
October 29	at Northern Arizona	No. 11	Walkup Skydome; Flagstaff, AZ	L 38–41	9,369	
November 5	Pacific (CA)*		Mackay Stadium; Reno, NV	W 34–24	8,174	
November 12	at No. 14 Idaho		Kibbie Dome; Moscow, ID	W 43–24	15,200	
November 19	Montana State	No. 14	Mackay Stadium; Reno, NV	W 33–3	7,011	
November 26	at No. 12 Idaho State*	No. 11	ASISU Minidome; Pocatello, ID (NCAA Division I-AA First Round)	W 27–20	10,333	
December 3	No. 4 North Texas State*	No. 11	Mackay Stadium; Reno, NV (NCAA Division I-AA Quarterfinal)	W 20–17 ^{OT}	7,878	
December 10	at No. 1 Southern Illinois*	No. 11	McAndrew Stadium; Carbondale, IL (NCAA Division I-AA Semifinal)	L 7–23	12,000	
*Non-conference game; ^{†}Homecoming; Rankings from NCAA Division I-AA Football Committee Poll released prior to the game
