= 1983 Boise State Broncos football team =

American college football season

1983 Boise State Broncos football
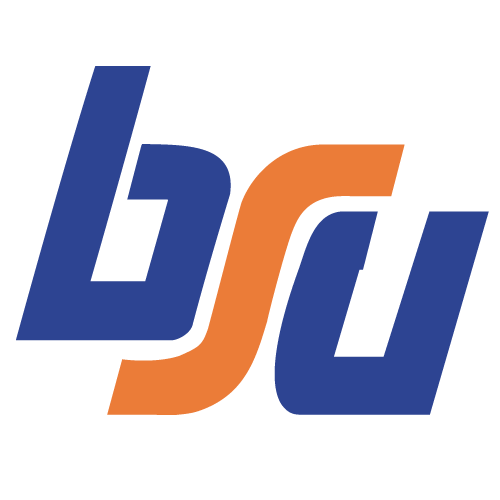
- Conference: Big Sky Conference
- Record: 6–5 (4–3 Big Sky)
- Head coach: Lyle Setencich (1st season)
- Defensive coordinator: Phil Snow (1st season)
- Home stadium: Bronco Stadium

1983 Big Sky Conference football standings
| | Conf. | | | | | Overall |
| Team | W | | L | | T | W | | L | | T |
|---|---|---|---|---|---|---|---|---|---|---|
| No. 11 Nevada * $^ | 6 | – | 1 | – | 0 | 10 | – | 4 | – | 0 |
| No. 12 Idaho State ^ | 5 | – | 2 | – | 0 | 8 | – | 4 | – | 0 |
| Idaho | 4 | – | 3 | – | 0 | 8 | – | 3 | – | 0 |
| Boise State | 4 | – | 3 | – | 0 | 6 | – | 5 | – | 0 |
| Weber State | 3 | – | 4 | – | 0 | 6 | – | 5 | – | 0 |
| Montana | 3 | – | 4 | – | 0 | 4 | – | 6 | – | 0 |
| Northern Arizona | 2 | – | 5 | – | 0 | 4 | – | 7 | – | 0 |
| Montana State | 1 | – | 6 | – | 0 | 1 | – | 10 | – | 0 |
$ – Conference champion; ^ – NCAA Division I-AA playoff participant; * – Nevada was given a win on the Fremont Cannon after UNLV was forced to forfeit the game after an investigation found that ineligible players had participated in the 1983 and 1984 seasons.; Rankings from NCAA Division I-AA Poll

The 1983 Boise State Broncos football team represented Boise State University as a member of Big Sky Conference during the 1983 NCAA Division I-AA football season. Led by first-year head coach Lyle Setencich, the Broncos compiled an overall record of 6–5 with a mark of 4–3 in conference play, tying for third place in the Big Sky. Boise State played home games on campus, at Bronco Stadium in Boise, Idaho.

Prior to the season in January, seven-year head coach Jim Criner left for Iowa State University. Defensive coordinator Setencich was soon promoted to head coach.

== Schedule ==
| Date | Time | Opponent | Site | Result | Attendance | Source |
|---|---|---|---|---|---|---|
| September 3 | 7:00 pm | Cal State Fullerton* | Bronco Stadium; Boise, ID | L 10–13 | 18,700 | |
| September 10 | 7:00 pm | Eastern Washington* | Bronco Stadium; Boise, ID | W 33–14 | 16,823 | |
| September 17 | | at Montana | Dornblaser Field; Missoula, MT | L 20–21 | 6,200 | |
| September 24 | | at Nevada | Mackay Stadium; Reno, NV (rivalry) | L 20–38 | 13,110 | |
| October 1 | 7:00 pm | No. 5 (D-II) Cal Poly* | Bronco Stadium; Boise, ID | W 27–3 | 15,738 | |
| October 15 | 1:30 pm | at Utah State* | Romney Stadium; Logan, UT | L 7–10 | 16,600 | |
| October 22 | 7:00 pm | Montana State | Bronco Stadium; Boise, ID | W 42–0 | 16,974 | |
| October 29 | 1:00 pm | at Weber State | Wildcat Stadium; Ogden, UT | W 38–27 | 10,923 | |
| November 5 | 1:30 pm | No. 9 Idaho State^{†} | Bronco Stadium; Boise, ID | W 32–20 | 20,477 | |
| November 12 | 1:30 pm | Northern Arizona | Bronco Stadium; Boise, ID | W 28–3 | 13,826 | |
| November 19 | 8:00 p.m. | at Idaho | Kibbie Dome; Moscow, ID (rivalry) | L 24–45 | 15,400 | |
*Non-conference game; ^{†}Homecoming; Rankings from NCAA Division I-AA Football Committee Poll released prior to the game; All times are in Mountain time

== Roster ==
1983 Boise State Broncos football team roster
Players
Coaches
Offense

| Pos. | # | Name | Class |
|---|---|---|---|
| QB | 10 | Hazsen Choates | Fr |
| QB | 13 | Gerald DesPres | Jr |
| TB | 29 | Greg Harrison | So |
| TB | 34 | Rodney Webster | Sr |
| FB | 46 | Dave Maloney | Jr |
| C | 53 | Scott Baker | So |
| G | 62 | Steve Despot | Jr |
| G | | Todd Biggs | Sr |
| OT | 73 | John Kilgo | Jr |
| TE | | Don Summers | Jr |
| WR | | Joe Trotter | Sr |
| WR | 85 | Pat Fitzgerald | So |
| WR | 89 | Kim Metcalf | Sr |

Defense

| Pos. | # | Name | Class |
|---|---|---|---|
| SS | 21 | Butch Fisk | Sr |
| CB | 22 | Jim Voulelis | Jr |
| FS | | David Snow | Jr |
| CB | | Gary Castille | Jr |
| LB | 48 | Mark Wulff | Jr |
| LB | | Chuck Butler | Sr |
| LB | 55 | Carl Keever | Jr |
| NG | 57 | Glenn Simonson | Sr |
| LDT | 66 | Jeff Caves | Sr |
| DT | 83 | Michel Bourgeau | Sr |
| LB | 95 | Paul Unger | Sr |
| RDT | 99 | Mark Koch | So |

Special teams

| Pos. | # | Name | Class |
|---|---|---|---|
| K | | Tony Massagli |
| P | 88 | Ron Talbot | So |

Head coach

- Lyle Setencich (1st year)

Coordinators/assistant coaches

- Phil Snow (DC)

Legend

- (C) Team captain
- (S) Suspended
- (I) Ineligible
- Injured
- Redshirt

== NFL draft ==
One Bronco senior was selected in the 1984 NFL draft, which lasted 12 rounds (336 selections).

| Player | Position | Round | Overall | Franchise |
| Michel Bourgeau | DL | 11th | 291 | New Orleans Saints |
