= 1983 Montana Grizzlies football team =

American college football season

1983 Montana Grizzlies football
- Conference: Big Sky Conference
- Record: 4–6 (3–4 Big Sky)
- Head coach: Larry Donovan (4th season)
- Offensive coordinator: Joe Glenn (2nd season)
- Home stadium: Dornblaser Field

1983 Big Sky Conference football standings
| | Conf. | | | | | Overall |
| Team | W | | L | | T | W | | L | | T |
|---|---|---|---|---|---|---|---|---|---|---|
| No. 11 Nevada * $^ | 6 | – | 1 | – | 0 | 10 | – | 4 | – | 0 |
| No. 12 Idaho State ^ | 5 | – | 2 | – | 0 | 8 | – | 4 | – | 0 |
| Idaho | 4 | – | 3 | – | 0 | 8 | – | 3 | – | 0 |
| Boise State | 4 | – | 3 | – | 0 | 6 | – | 5 | – | 0 |
| Weber State | 3 | – | 4 | – | 0 | 6 | – | 5 | – | 0 |
| Montana | 3 | – | 4 | – | 0 | 4 | – | 6 | – | 0 |
| Northern Arizona | 2 | – | 5 | – | 0 | 4 | – | 7 | – | 0 |
| Montana State | 1 | – | 6 | – | 0 | 1 | – | 10 | – | 0 |
$ – Conference champion; ^ – NCAA Division I-AA playoff participant; * – Nevada was given a win on the Fremont Cannon after UNLV was forced to forfeit the game after an investigation found that ineligible players had participated in the 1983 and 1984 seasons.; Rankings from NCAA Division I-AA Poll

The 1983 Montana Grizzlies football team represented the University of Montana in the 1983 NCAA Division I-AA football season as a member of the Big Sky Conference (Big Sky). The Grizzlies were led by fourth-year head coach Larry Donovan, played their home games at Dornblaser Field and finished the season with a record of four wins and six losses (4–6, 3–4 Big Sky).

Prior to the season, quarterback Marty Mornhinweg and fullback Joe Klucewich were suspended for academic infractions.

== Schedule ==
| Date | Time | Opponent | Site | Result | Attendance | Source |
|---|---|---|---|---|---|---|
| September 17 | | Boise State | Dornblaser Field; Missoula, MT | W 21–20 | 6,200 | |
| September 24 | | Portland State* | Dornblaser Field; Missoula, MT | W 35–19 | 9,042 | |
| October 1 | | at Northern Arizona | Walkup Skydome; Flagstaff, AZ | W 21–17 | | |
| October 8 | | Weber State | Dornblaser Field; Missoula, MT | W 28–26 | 11,060 | |
| October 15 | | Nevada | Dornblaser Field; Missoula, MT | L 0–38 | | |
| October 22 | | at Idaho | Kibbie Dome; Moscow, ID (Little Brown Stein) | L 24–45 | 16,400 | |
| October 29 | | at Montana State | Reno H. Sales Stadium; Bozeman, MT (rivalry) | L 8–28 | 15,197 | |
| November 5 | | Long Beach State* | Dornblaser Field; Missoula, MT | L 14–38 | 7,125 | |
| November 12 | 2:30 p.m. | at Eastern Washington* | Joe Albi Stadium; Spokane, WA (rivalry) | L 26–27 | | |
| November 19 | | No. 17 Idaho State | Dornblaser Field; Missoula, MT | L 17–31 | 5,755 | |
*Non-conference game; Rankings from NCAA Division I-AA Football Committee Poll released prior to the game; All times are in Mountain time
