= 1983 Idaho State Bengals football team =

American college football season

1983 Idaho State Bengals football

NCAA Division I-AA First Round, L 20–27 vs. Nevada
- Conference: Big Sky Conference
- Record: 8–4 (5–2 Big Sky)
- Head coach: Jim Koetter (1st season)
- Offensive scheme: West Coast
- Defensive coordinator: Jim Moller (1st season)
- Base defense: 4–3
- Home stadium: ASISU Minidome

1983 Big Sky Conference football standings
	Conf.					Overall
Team	W		L		T	W		L		T
No. 11 Nevada * $^	6	–	1	–	0	10	–	4	–	0
No. 12 Idaho State ^	5	–	2	–	0	8	–	4	–	0
Idaho	4	–	3	–	0	8	–	3	–	0
Boise State	4	–	3	–	0	6	–	5	–	0
Weber State	3	–	4	–	0	6	–	5	–	0
Montana	3	–	4	–	0	4	–	6	–	0
Northern Arizona	2	–	5	–	0	4	–	7	–	0
Montana State	1	–	6	–	0	1	–	10	–	0
$ – Conference champion; ^ – NCAA Division I-AA playoff participant; * – Nevada was given a win on the Fremont Cannon after UNLV was forced to forfeit the game after an investigation found that ineligible players had participated in the 1983 and 1984 seasons.; Rankings from NCAA Division I-AA Poll

The 1983 Idaho State Bengals football team represented Idaho State University as member of the Big Sky Conference during the 1983 NCAA Division I-AA football season. The Bengals were led by first-year head coach Jim Koetter and played home games at the ASISU MiniDome (now Holt Arena), an indoor venue on campus in Pocatello, Idaho.

After a disappointing season as defending national champions in 1982, the Bengals regrouped and went 8–3 overall in the regular season (5–2 in Big Sky, second). Led by senior quarterback Paul Peterson, Idaho State hosted the first round of the 12-team I-AA playoffs, but lost to conference champion Nevada by seven points and finished at 8–4.

Koetter was promoted to head coach in early June after Dave Kragthorpe left to become athletic director at his alma mater, Utah State in Logan. Later that month, quarterback Peterson had knee surgery.

== Schedule ==
Date	Opponent	Rank	Site	Result	Attendance	Source
September 10	at UTEP*		Sun Bowl; El Paso, TX	W 12–10	20,193	
September 17	at Eastern Washington*		Joe Albi Stadium; Spokane, WA	W 20–13	2,000	
September 24	No. 11 Idaho	No. 13	ASISU MiniDome; Pocatello, ID (rivalry)	W 41–31	12,983	
October 1	at Nevada	No. 8	Mackay Stadium; Reno, NV	L 7–23	9,324	
October 8	Montana State^{†}	No. 14	ASISU MiniDome; Pocatello, ID	W 26–3	11,321	
October 15	Northern Arizona	No. 13	ASISU MiniDome; Pocatello, ID	W 42–24	9,545	
October 22	at Cal Poly*	No. 9	Mustang Stadium; San Luis Obispo, CA	L 37–44	5,262	
October 29	Cal State Fullerton*	No. 15	ASISU MiniDome; Pocatello, ID	W 43–10	8,215	
November 5	at Boise State	No. 9	Bronco Stadium; Boise, ID	L 20–32	20,477	
November 12	Weber State	No. 19	ASISU MiniDome; Pocatello, ID	W 38–32	10,834	
November 19	at Montana	No. 17	Dornblaser Field; Missoula MT	W 31–17	5,755	
November 26	No. 11 Nevada*	No. 12	ASISU MiniDome; Pocatello, ID (NCAA Division I-AA First Round)	L 20–27	10,333	
*Non-conference game; ^{†}Homecoming; Rankings from AP Poll released prior to the game
