= 1983 Idaho Vandals football team =

American college football season

1983 Idaho Vandals football
- Conference: Big Sky Conference
- Record: 8–3 (4–3 Big Sky)
- Head coach: Dennis Erickson (2nd season)
- Offensive coordinator: Dan Cozzetto (1st season)
- Defensive coordinator: John L. Smith (2nd season)
- Home stadium: Kibbie Dome

1983 Big Sky Conference football standings
	Conf.					Overall
Team	W		L		T	W		L		T
No. 11 Nevada * $^	6	–	1	–	0	10	–	4	–	0
No. 12 Idaho State ^	5	–	2	–	0	8	–	4	–	0
Idaho	4	–	3	–	0	8	–	3	–	0
Boise State	4	–	3	–	0	6	–	5	–	0
Weber State	3	–	4	–	0	6	–	5	–	0
Montana	3	–	4	–	0	4	–	6	–	0
Northern Arizona	2	–	5	–	0	4	–	7	–	0
Montana State	1	–	6	–	0	1	–	10	–	0
$ – Conference champion; ^ – NCAA Division I-AA playoff participant; * – Nevada was given a win on the Fremont Cannon after UNLV was forced to forfeit the game after an investigation found that ineligible players had participated in the 1983 and 1984 seasons.; Rankings from NCAA Division I-AA Poll

The 1983 Idaho Vandals football team represented the University of Idaho in the 1983 NCAA Division I-AA football season. The Vandals, led by second-year head coach Dennis Erickson, were members of the Big Sky Conference and played their home games at the Kibbie Dome, an indoor facility on campus in Moscow, Idaho.

Led by senior quarterback Ken Hobart, the Vandals finished 8–3 in the regular season and 4–3 in the Big Sky to tie for third with rival Boise State, whom they defeated in consecutive years for the first time. It was Idaho's first win in Moscow in the series in six tries, and was the second of twelve straight over the Broncos, through 1993.

The Vandals won four of five home games in 1983, losing to Nevada for the fifth year in a row. They also lost to conference runner-up Idaho State; both of whom were selected for the 12-team I-AA playoffs. Idaho won all four of its non-conference games, but three were against Division II and NAIA opponents.

Although Idaho missed the postseason, 1983 marked the first time in 45 years that the Vandals had consecutive winning seasons in football, last accomplished in 1938 under head coach Ted Bank. After just two seasons, Erickson's seventeen victories placed him sixth in career wins among Vandal head coaches.

== Notable players ==
Senior quarterback Ken Hobart, a walk-on four-year starter, led the 1983 Vandals to an 8–3 record and named a Division I-AA All-American. Selected in the second round of the 1984 USFL draft by Jacksonville, he was traded to Denver during the season and then spent six seasons (1985–90) in the CFL. He was selected tenth in the 1984 NFL Supplemental Draft by the New York Jets, but never played in the NFL.

== Schedule ==
Date	Time	Opponent	Rank	Site	Result	Attendance	Source
September 10	7:00 pm	Southern Colorado*		Kibbie Dome; Moscow, ID	W 43–28	12,500	
September 17	12:30 pm	at Montana State		Reno H. Sales Stadium; Bozeman, MT	W 23–0	8,127	
September 24	6:30 pm	at No. 13 Idaho State	No. 11	ASISU Minidome; Pocatello, ID (rivalry)	L 31–41	12,983	
October 1	7:00 pm	Eastern Washington*	No. 20	Kibbie Dome; Moscow, ID	W 38–24	12,500	
October 8	7:00 pm	at Portland State*	No. 19	Civic Stadium; Portland, OR	W 17–16	3,853	
October 15	6:00 pm	at Weber State	No. 19	Wildcat Stadium; Ogden, UT	L 10–28	15,632	
October 22	1:30 pm	Montana^{†}		Kibbie Dome; Moscow, ID (Little Brown Stein)	W 45–24	16,400	
October 29	2:00 pm	at Pacific (CA)*	No. 19	Pacific Memorial Stadium; Stockton, CA	W 31–19	11,500	
November 5	6:30 pm	at Northern Arizona	No. 14	Walkup Skydome; Flagstaff, AZ	W 40–10	7,138	
November 12	7:00 pm	Nevada	No. 14	Kibbie Dome; Moscow, ID	L 24–43	15,200	
November 19	7:00 pm	Boise State		Kibbie Dome; Moscow, ID (rivalry)	W 45–24	15,400	
*Non-conference game; ^{†}Homecoming; Rankings from NCAA Division I-AA Football Committee Poll released prior to the game; All times are in Pacific time

== Roster ==
1983 Idaho Vandals football team roster
Players
Coaches
Offense

Pos.	#	Name	Class
WR	7	Brian Allen	Sr
QB	9	Ken Hobart	Sr
QB	10	Scott Linehan	So
TE	12	Scott Auker	So
QB	15	Darel Tracy	Fr
RB	23	Mike Shill	Jr
RB	26	Marlon Barrow	Jr
RB	32	Steve Jackson	So
RB	34	Kerry Hickey	Sr
G	55	Lance West	Jr
C	60	Shawn Jackson	Sr
OT	62	Steve Seman	Sr
G	68	Matt Watson	Jr
OT	77	Dave Thorsen	Sr
TE	87	Kurt Vestman	Sr
WR	89	Ron Whittenburg	Sr

Defense

Pos.	#	Name	Class
CB	2	Calvin Loveall	Jr
CB	4	Steve Simpson	Jr
CB		Mike Johnston	Jr
FS	16	Mark Tidd	Fr
LB	33	John Crout	Sr
LB	38	Tom Hennessey	Fr
SS	42	Boyce Bailey	Sr
DE	44	Frank Moreno (injured)	Sr
DE	47	Darby Lewis	Sr
LB		Mike Cox	Fr
LB		Todd Fryhover	Jr
LB		Ed Rifilato	Jr
DT	64	Joe Smiley	So
DT	66	John Alwine	Sr
DT		John Andrews	Sr
DE		Dan Anderson	Jr
DE		Sam Manoa	Jr

Special teams

Pos.	#	Name	Class
K	3	Tim McMonigle	Jr
P	9	Ken Hobart	Sr
P		Darin Magnuson	Fr

Head coach

- Dennis Erickson (2nd year)

Coordinators/assistant coaches

- Dan Cozzetto (OC)
- John L. Smith (DC)
- Chris Tormey (DL)

Legend

- (C) Team captain
- (S) Suspended
- (I) Ineligible
- Injured
- Redshirt

== All-conference ==
Quarterback Hobart, flanker Brian Allen, and safety Boyce Bailey were named to the Big Sky all-conference team; Hobart repeated as the league's outstanding offensive player. Vandals named to the second team were tight end Kurt Vestman, wide receiver Ron Whittenburg, running back Kerry Hickey, guard Lance West, and linebacker / defensive end Sam Manoa.

== NFL draft ==
One Vandal senior was selected in the 1984 NFL draft in early May, which lasted 12 rounds (336 selections).

Player	Position	Round	Overall	Franchise
Kurt Vestman	TE	10th	266	Chicago Bears

All-American quarterback Ken Hobart was a second round selection of the Jacksonville Bulls in the 1984 USFL draft in early January, and signed a contract later that month.
