= 1983 Weber State Wildcats football team =

American college football season

1983 Weber State Wildcats football
- Conference: Big Sky Conference
- Record: 6–5 (3–4 Big Sky)
- Head coach: Mike Price (3rd season)
- Home stadium: Wildcat Stadium

1983 Big Sky Conference football standings
	Conf.					Overall
Team	W		L		T	W		L		T
No. 11 Nevada * $^	6	–	1	–	0	10	–	4	–	0
No. 12 Idaho State ^	5	–	2	–	0	8	–	4	–	0
Idaho	4	–	3	–	0	8	–	3	–	0
Boise State	4	–	3	–	0	6	–	5	–	0
Weber State	3	–	4	–	0	6	–	5	–	0
Montana	3	–	4	–	0	4	–	6	–	0
Northern Arizona	2	–	5	–	0	4	–	7	–	0
Montana State	1	–	6	–	0	1	–	10	–	0
$ – Conference champion; ^ – NCAA Division I-AA playoff participant; * – Nevada was given a win on the Fremont Cannon after UNLV was forced to forfeit the game after an investigation found that ineligible players had participated in the 1983 and 1984 seasons.; Rankings from NCAA Division I-AA Poll

The 1983 Weber State Wildcats football team represented Weber State College (now known as Weber State University) as a member of the Big Sky Conference during the 1983 NCAA Division I-AA football season. Led by third-year head coach Mike Price, the Wildcats compiled an overall record of 6–5, with a mark of 3–4 in conference play, and finished tied for fifth in the Big Sky.

== Schedule ==
Date	Opponent	Site	Result	Attendance	Source
September 3	Southwest State*	Wildcat Stadium; Ogden, UT	W 33–21	5,926	
September 17	Northern Arizona	Wildcat Stadium; Ogden, UT	W 26–13		
September 24	at Eastern Washington*	Woodward Field; Cheney, WA	W 21–17	1,927	
October 1	at Montana State	Sales Stadium; Bozeman, MT	W 23–20	6,397	
October 8	at Montana	Dornblaser Field; Missoula, MT	L 26–28	11,060	
October 15	No. 19 Idaho^{†}	Wildcat Stadium; Ogden, UT	W 28–10	15,632	
October 22	at No. 16 Nevada	Mackay Stadium; Reno, NV	L 3–41	12,258	
October 29	Boise State	Wildcat Stadium; Ogden, UT	L 27–38	10,923	
November 5	Portland State*	Wildcat Stadium; Ogden, UT	W 37–13	7,643	
November 12	at No. 19 Idaho State	ASISU MiniDome; Pocatello, ID	L 32–38	10,834	
November 19	at UTEP*	Sun Bowl; El Paso, TX	L 34–40	11,500	
*Non-conference game; ^{†}Homecoming; Rankings from NCAA Division I-AA Football Committee Poll released prior to the game
