= 1983 Montana State Bobcats football team =

American college football season

1983 Montana State Bobcats football
- Conference: Big Sky Conference
- Record: 1–10 (1–6 Big Sky)
- Head coach: Dave Arnold (1st season)
- Home stadium: Sales Stadium

1983 Big Sky Conference football standings
	Conf.					Overall
Team	W		L		T	W		L		T
No. 11 Nevada * $^	6	–	1	–	0	10	–	4	–	0
No. 12 Idaho State ^	5	–	2	–	0	8	–	4	–	0
Idaho	4	–	3	–	0	8	–	3	–	0
Boise State	4	–	3	–	0	6	–	5	–	0
Weber State	3	–	4	–	0	6	–	5	–	0
Montana	3	–	4	–	0	4	–	6	–	0
Northern Arizona	2	–	5	–	0	4	–	7	–	0
Montana State	1	–	6	–	0	1	–	10	–	0
$ – Conference champion; ^ – NCAA Division I-AA playoff participant; * – Nevada was given a win on the Fremont Cannon after UNLV was forced to forfeit the game after an investigation found that ineligible players had participated in the 1983 and 1984 seasons.; Rankings from NCAA Division I-AA Poll

The 1983 Montana State Bobcats football team was an American football team that represented Montana State University in the Big Sky Conference during the 1983 NCAA Division I-AA football season. In their first season under head coach Dave Arnold, the Bobcats compiled a 1–10 record (1–6 against Big Sky opponents) and finished last in the Big Sky.

== Schedule ==
Date	Opponent	Site	Result	Attendance	Source
September 3	at Washington State*	Joe Albi Stadium; Spokane, WA	L 7–27	21,750	
September 10	at North Dakota*	Memorial Stadium; Grand Forks, ND	L 3–21	12,000	
September 17	Idaho	Sales Stadium; Bozeman, MT	L 0–23	8,127	
September 24	at Northern Arizona	Walkup Skydome; Flagstaff, AZ	L 16–33		
October 1	Weber State	Sales Stadium; Bozeman, MT	L 20–23	6,397	
October 8	at No. 14 Idaho State	ASISU MiniDome; Pocatello, ID	L 3–26	11,321	
October 15	Fresno State*^{†}	Sales Stadium; Bozeman, MT	L 12–31	6,467	
October 22	at Boise State	Bronco Stadium; Boise, ID	L 0–42	16,974	
October 29	Montana	Sales Stadium; Bozeman, MT (rivalry)	W 28–8	15,197	
November 5	Eastern Washington	Sales Stadium; Bozeman, MT	L 17–22	4,017	
November 19	at No. 14 Nevada	Mackay Stadium; Reno, NV	L 3–33	7,011	
*Non-conference game; ^{†}Homecoming; Rankings from NCAA Division I-AA Football Committee Poll released prior to the game
