= 1983 UNLV Rebels football team =

American college football season

1983 UNLV Rebels football
- Conference: Pacific Coast Athletic Association
- Record: 0–11, 7 wins forfeited (0–6 PCAA, 4 wins forfeited)
- Head coach: Harvey Hyde (2nd season)
- Home stadium: Las Vegas Silver Bowl

1983 Pacific Coast Athletic Association football standings
	Conf.					Overall
Team	W		L		T	W		L		T
Cal State Fullerton $	6	–	0	–	0	8	–	4	–	0
Utah State	4	–	2	–	0	6	–	5	–	0
Long Beach State	3	–	3	–	0	8	–	4	–	0
Fresno State	3	–	3	–	0	7	–	4	–	0
San Jose State	3	–	3	–	0	5	–	6	–	0
Pacific (CA)	2	–	4	–	0	4	–	8	–	0
UNLV	0	–	6	–	0	0	–	11	–	0
$ – Conference champion; Records adjusted for UNLV's forfeit of all 7 victories

The 1983 UNLV Rebels football team was an American football team that represented the University of Nevada, Las Vegas (UNLV) as a member of the Pacific Coast Athletic Association (PCAA) during the 1983 NCAA Division I-A football season. In their second year under head coach Harvey Hyde, the Rebels compiled an overall record of 7–4 record with a mark of 4–2 in conference play, placing second in the PCAA. The team played home games at the Las Vegas Silver Bowl in Whitney, Nevada.

In March 1985, the NCAA ruled UNLV to forfeit all of its victories from their 1983 and 1984 seasons due to playing with ineligible players.

== Schedule ==
Date	Opponent	Site	Result	Attendance	Source
September 3	Nevada*	Las Vegas Silver Bowl; Whitney, NV (Fremont Cannon)	F 28–18 (forfeit)	16,168	
September 10	at San Jose State	Spartan Stadium; San Jose, CA	L 26–31	15,127	
September 17	Pacific (CA)	Las Vegas Silver Bowl; Whitney, NV	F 28–7 (forfeit)	16,146	
September 24	at Washington State*	Joe Albi Stadium; Spokane, WA	L 28–41	16,500	
October 1	at Oregon State*	Parker Stadium; Corvallis, OR	F 35–21 (forfeit)	26,500	
October 15	Hawaii*	Las Vegas Silver Bowl; Whitney, NV	L 0–23	16,520	
October 22	Utah State	Las Vegas Silver Bowl; Whitney, NV	F 28–10 (forfeit)	12,300	
October 27	San Diego State*	Las Vegas Silver Bowl; Whitney, NV	F 28–10 (forfeit)	14,275	
November 5	at Fresno State	Bulldog Stadium; Fresno, CA	F 20–7 (forfeit)	24,054	
November 12	at Cal State Fullerton	Glover Stadium; Anaheim, CA	F 13–0 (forfeit)	5,000	
November 19	Long Beach State	Las Vegas Silver Bowl; Whitney, NV	L 21–24	17,955	
*Non-conference game

== Roster ==
1983 UNLV Rebels football team roster
Players
Coaches
Offense

Pos.	#	Name	Class
QB	12	Randall Cunningham	Jr

Defense

Pos.	#	Name	Class
LB	47	Kirk Dodge	Sr
DB	39	Teddy Nelson	So

Special teams

Pos.	#	Name	Class

Head coach

- Harvey Hyde

Coordinators/assistant coaches

Legend

- (C) Team captain
- (S) Suspended
- (I) Ineligible
- Injured
- Redshirt
