= California Bowl =

American college football bowl game

California Bowl (defunct)
- California Raisin Bowl
- Stadium: Bulldog Stadium
- Location: Fresno, California
- Operated: 1981–1991
- Conference tie-ins: PCAA/Big West, MAC

Sponsors
- California Raisin Advisory Board (1988–1991)

The California Bowl (later the California Raisin Bowl) was a post-season college football bowl game played annually at Bulldog Stadium in Fresno, California, from 1981 to 1991. The game featured the champions of the Big West Conference (known prior to 1988 as the Pacific Coast Athletic Association) and the Mid-American Conference.

In 1988, the California Raisin Advisory Board purchased the naming rights to the bowl.

The game was dealt a severe blow in 1992 when Fresno State moved to the Western Athletic Conference. The MAC and Big West then moved their tie-ins to Las Vegas, Nevada and created the Las Vegas Bowl. The California Bowl made plans to hold the 1992 game without tie-ins, but was unable to find a new sponsor. When organizers came up short of a $1.75 million fundraising goal, the NCAA pulled the bowl's certification. It has never returned.

== Game results ==
Date played	Winning team		Losing team		Notes
December 19, 1981	Toledo	27	No. 20 San Jose State	25	notes
December 18, 1982	Fresno State	29	Bowling Green	28	notes
December 17, 1983	Northern Illinois	20	Cal State Fullerton	13	notes
December 15, 1984	Toledo *	13	UNLV	30	notes
December 14, 1985	No. 18 Fresno State	51	No. 20 Bowling Green	7	notes
December 13, 1986	No. 19 San Jose State	37	Miami (OH)	7	notes
December 12, 1987	Eastern Michigan	30	San Jose State	27	notes
December 10, 1988	Fresno State	35	Western Michigan	30	notes
December 9, 1989	Fresno State	27	Ball State	6	notes
December 8, 1990	No. 25 San Jose State	48	Central Michigan	24	notes
December 14, 1991	Bowling Green	28	Fresno State	21	notes

* UNLV won this game, but subsequently forfeited its entire schedule due to the use of ineligible players earlier in the season.

== MVPs ==
Season	MVP	Team	Position	Reference(s)
1981	Arnold Smiley	Toledo	RB	
1982	Jeff Tedford	Fresno State	QB	
1983	Lou Wicks	Northern Illinois	FB	
1984	Randall Cunningham	UNLV	QB	
1984	Steve Morgan	Toledo	RB	
1985	Mike Mancini	Fresno State	P	
1986	Mike Perez	San Jose State	QB	
1987	Gary Patton	Eastern Michigan	RB	
1988	Darrell Rosette	Fresno State	RB	
1989	Ron Cox	Fresno State	LB	
1990	Sheldon Canley	San Jose State	RB	
1990	Ken Ealy	Central Michigan	WR	
1991	Mark Szlachcic	Bowling Green	WR	

== Appearances by team ==
Rank	Team	Appearances	Record	Win %
1	[[Fresno State Bulldogs football|Fresno State]]	5	4–1	.800
2	[[San Jose State Spartans football|San Jose State]]	4	2–2	.500
3	[[Bowling Green Falcons football|Bowling Green]]	3	1–2	.333
4	[[Toledo Rockets football|Toledo]]	2	2–0	1.000
T5	[[Eastern Michigan Eagles football|Eastern Michigan]]	1	1–0	1.000
T5	[[Northern Illinois Huskies football|Northern Illinois]]	1	1–0	1.000
T5	[[Ball State Cardinals football|Ball State]]	1	0–1	.000
T5	[[Cal State Fullerton Titans football|Cal State Fullerton]]	1	0–1	.000
T5	[[Central Michigan Chippewas football|Central Michigan]]	1	0–1	.000
T5	[[Miami RedHawks football|Miami (OH)]]	1	0–1	.000
T5	[[UNLV Rebels football|UNLV]]	1	0–1	.000
T5	[[Western Michigan Broncos football|Western Michigan]]	1	0–1	.000

== Appearances by conference ==
Rank	Conference	Appearances	Record	Win %	# of Teams	Teams
T1	Big West	11	6–5	.545	4	Fresno State (4–1) San Jose State (2–2); Cal State Fullerton (0–1); UNLV (0–1)
T1	MAC	11	5–6	.455	8	Bowling Green (1–2) Toledo (2–0); Eastern Michigan (1–0); Northern Illinois (1–0); Ball State (0–1); Central Michigan (0–1); Miami (OH) (0–1); Western Michigan (0–1)

== See also ==
- List of college bowl games
