= 1983 Northern Arizona Lumberjacks football team =

American college football season

1983 Northern Arizona Lumberjacks football
- Conference: Big Sky Conference
- Record: 4–7 (2–5 Big Sky)
- Head coach: Joe Harper (2nd season)
- Home stadium: Walkup Skydome

1983 Big Sky Conference football standings
	Conf.					Overall
Team	W		L		T	W		L		T
No. 11 Nevada * $^	6	–	1	–	0	10	–	4	–	0
No. 12 Idaho State ^	5	–	2	–	0	8	–	4	–	0
Idaho	4	–	3	–	0	8	–	3	–	0
Boise State	4	–	3	–	0	6	–	5	–	0
Weber State	3	–	4	–	0	6	–	5	–	0
Montana	3	–	4	–	0	4	–	6	–	0
Northern Arizona	2	–	5	–	0	4	–	7	–	0
Montana State	1	–	6	–	0	1	–	10	–	0
$ – Conference champion; ^ – NCAA Division I-AA playoff participant; * – Nevada was given a win on the Fremont Cannon after UNLV was forced to forfeit the game after an investigation found that ineligible players had participated in the 1983 and 1984 seasons.; Rankings from NCAA Division I-AA Poll

The 1983 Northern Arizona Lumberjacks football team represented Northern Arizona University as a member of the Big Sky Conference during the 1983 NCAA Division I-AA football season. Led by second-year head coach Joe Harper, the Lumberjacks compiled an overall record of 4–7, with a mark of 2–5 in conference play, and finished seventh in the Big Sky.

== Schedule ==
Date	Opponent	Site	Result	Attendance	Source
September 10	Southern Utah*	Walkup Skydome; Flagstaff, AZ	W 53–3	10,334	
September 17	at Weber State	Wildcat Stadium; Ogden, UT	L 13–26		
September 24	Montana State	Walkup Skydome; Flagstaff, AZ	W 33–16		
October 1	Montana	Walkup Skydome; Flagstaff, AZ	L 17–21		
October 8	Eastern Washington*	Walkup Skydome; Flagstaff, AZ	W 21–22	4,245	
October 15	at No. 13 Idaho State	ASISU MiniDome; Pocatello, ID	L 24–42	9,545	
October 22	at Pacific (CA)*	Pacific Memorial Stadium; Stockton, CA	L 14–28	7,000	
October 29	No. 11 Nevada	Walkup Skydome; Flagstaff, AZ	W 41–38	9,369	
November 5	No. 14 Idaho	Walkup Skydome; Flagstaff, AZ	L 10–40	7,138	
November 12	at Boise State	Bronco Stadium; Boise, ID	L 3–28	13,826	
November 19	at Fresno State*	Bulldog Stadium; Fresno, CA	L 22–30	20,527	
*Non-conference game; Rankings from NCAA Division I-AA Football Committee Poll released prior to the game
