= 1983 Utah State Aggies football team =

American college football season

1983 Utah State Aggies football
- Conference: Pacific Coast Athletic Association
- Record: 6–5 (4–2 PCAA)
- Head coach: Chris Pella (1st season)
- Defensive coordinator: Kent Baer (1st season)
- Home stadium: Romney Stadium

1983 Pacific Coast Athletic Association football standings
	Conf.					Overall
Team	W		L		T	W		L		T
Cal State Fullerton $	6	–	0	–	0	8	–	4	–	0
Utah State	4	–	2	–	0	6	–	5	–	0
Long Beach State	3	–	3	–	0	8	–	4	–	0
Fresno State	3	–	3	–	0	7	–	4	–	0
San Jose State	3	–	3	–	0	5	–	6	–	0
Pacific (CA)	2	–	4	–	0	4	–	8	–	0
UNLV	0	–	6	–	0	0	–	11	–	0
$ – Conference champion; Records adjusted for UNLV's forfeit of all 7 victories

The 1983 Utah State Aggies football team represented Utah State University during the 1983 NCAA Division I-A football season as a member of the Pacific Coast Athletic Association (PCAA). The Aggies were led by first-year head coach Chris Pella and played their home games at Romney Stadium in Logan, Utah. They finished the season with a record of 6–5 (4–2 in conference play).

== Schedule ==
Date	Opponent	Site	Result	Attendance	Source
September 10	at Arizona State*	Sun Devil Stadium; Tempe, AZ	L 12–39	65,290	
September 17	Cal State Fullerton	Romney Stadium; Logan, UT	L 24–25	11,933	
September 24	at Missouri*	Faurot Field; Columbia, MO	L 10–17	45,033	
October 1	Fresno State	Romney Stadium; Logan, UT	W 20–12	10,179	
October 8	at Pacific (CA)	Pacific Memorial Stadium; Stockton, CA	W 27–10	9,500	
October 15	Boise State*	Romney Stadium; Logan, UT	W 10–7	16,476	
October 22	at UNLV	Las Vegas Silver Bowl; Whitney, NV	W 10–28 (UNLV forfeit)	12,300	
October 29	at No. 15 BYU*	Cougar Stadium; Provo, UT (rivalry, Beehive Boot)	L 34–38	64,593	
November 5	San Jose State	Romney Stadium; Logan, UT	W 22–15	9,181	
November 12	Utah*	Romney Stadium; Logan, UT (Battle of the Brothers, Beehive Boot)	W 21–17	19,301	
November 25	at Long Beach State	Veterans Memorial Stadium; Long Beach, CA	L 3–6	3,878	
*Non-conference game; Rankings from AP Poll released prior to the game
