= 1983 Fresno State Bulldogs football team =

American college football season

1983 Fresno State Bulldogs football
- Conference: Pacific Coast Athletic Association
- Record: 7–4 (3–3 PCAA)
- Head coach: Jim Sweeney (6th season)
- Home stadium: Bulldog Stadium

1983 Pacific Coast Athletic Association football standings
	Conf.					Overall
Team	W		L		T	W		L		T
Cal State Fullerton $	6	–	0	–	0	8	–	4	–	0
Utah State	4	–	2	–	0	6	–	5	–	0
Long Beach State	3	–	3	–	0	8	–	4	–	0
Fresno State	3	–	3	–	0	7	–	4	–	0
San Jose State	3	–	3	–	0	5	–	6	–	0
Pacific (CA)	2	–	4	–	0	4	–	8	–	0
UNLV	0	–	6	–	0	0	–	11	–	0
$ – Conference champion; Records adjusted for UNLV's forfeit of all 7 victories

The 1983 Fresno State Bulldogs football team represented California State University, Fresno as a member of the Pacific Coast Athletic Association (PCAA) during the 1983 NCAA Division I-A football season. Led by sixth-year head coach Jim Sweeney, Fresno State finished the season with an overall record of 6–5 and a mark of 2–4 in conference play, placing sixth place in the PCAA. The Bulldogs played their home games at Bulldog Stadium in Fresno, California.

After the 1984 season, it was discovered that the UNLV Rebels had used multiple ineligible players during both the 1983 and 1984 seasons. As a result, UNLV's win in 1983 over Fresno State was forfeited, adjusting the Bulldogs' record to 7–4 overall and 3–3 in conference play, moving them into a tie for third place in the PCAA.

== Schedule ==
Date	Opponent	Site	Result	Attendance	Source
September 10	Bowling Green*	Bulldog Stadium; Fresno, CA	L 27–35	30,000	
September 17	Nevada*	Bulldog Stadium; Fresno, CA	W 24–22	27,705	
September 24	at Pacific (CA)	Pacific Memorial Stadium; Stockton, CA	W 34–14	16,234	
October 1	at Utah State	Romney Stadium; Logan, UT	L 12–20	10,179	
October 8	San Jose State	Bulldog Stadium; Fresno, CA (rivalry)	L 23–41	35,000	
October 15	at Montana State*	Reno H. Sales Stadium; Bozeman, MT	W 31–12	6,467	
October 22	Cal State Fullerton	Bulldog Stadium; Fresno, CA	L 17–18	26,903	
October 29	Cal Poly*	Bulldog Stadium; Fresno, CA	W 30–7	25,712	
November 5	UNLV^{†}	Bulldog Stadium; Fresno, CA	W 7–20 (forfeit win)	24,054	
November 12	at Long Beach State	Veterans Stadium; Long Beach, CA	W 7–3	2,017	
November 19	Northern Arizona*	Bulldog Stadium; Fresno, CA	W 30–22	20,527	
*Non-conference game; ^{†}Homecoming

== Team players in the NFL ==
The following were selected in the 1984 NFL draft.

Player	Position	Round	Overall	NFL team
Derrick Franklin	Defensive back	10	260	Atlanta Falcons

The following finished their college career in 1983, were not drafted, but played in the NFL.

Player	Position	First NFL Team
Clyde Glover	Defensive tackle	1987 San Francisco 49ers
