= Chris Pella =

American football player and coach (born 1943)

Biographical details
- Born: 1943 (age 82–83); Brigham City, Utah, U.S.

Playing career
- 1962–1963: Dixie
- 1964–1965: Utah State
- Positions: Fullback, placekicker

Coaching career (HC unless noted)
- 1965–1968: Utah State (assistant)
- 1972–1982: Utah State (assistant)
- 1983–1985: Utah State
- 1986–2000: BYU (TE/RC)

Head coaching record
- Overall: 9–24

Chris Pella (born 1943) is an American former college football coach and player. He served as the head football coach at Utah State University from 1983 to 1985 compiling a record of 9–24.

== Coaching career ==
Pella attended Box Elder High School in Brigham City, Utah. He began his college football career at Dixie Junior College, where he was team captain and an All-American. He then transferred to Utah State University, where he played as a fullback, offensive lineman, and kicker at various points. After graduation, Pella was retained as an assistant coach. He served in this capacity for four years before taking a position with the United States Navy as athletic director for the Yokosuka Naval Arsenal. He returned to Utah State in 1972, where he worked as an assistant under Bruce Snyder until his promotion to head coach in 1983. He resigned from his post at Utah State in 1985 after three losing seasons.

Following his dismissal from his alma mater, Pella was hired by LaVell Edwards to work on the football staff at Brigham Young University (BYU). From 1986 to 2000, he coached tight ends and served as chief recruiting coordinator. He continued to scout for the program until his retirement in 2003.

== Head coaching record ==
Year	Team	Overall	Conference	Standing	Bowl/playoffs
Utah State Aggies (Pacific Coast Athletic Association) (1983–1985)
1983	Utah State	5–6	3–3	5th	
1984	Utah State	1–10	1–5	7th	
1985	Utah State	3–8	3–4	5th	
Utah State:		9–24	7–12		
Total:		9–24			
