= 1983 Long Beach State 49ers football team =

American college football season

1983 Long Beach State 49ers football
- Conference: Pacific Coast Athletic Association
- Record: 8–4 (3–3 PCAA)
- Head coach: Dave Currey (7th season)
- Defensive coordinator: Ken Visser (3rd season)
- Home stadium: Veterans Stadium

1983 Pacific Coast Athletic Association football standings
	Conf.					Overall
Team	W		L		T	W		L		T
Cal State Fullerton $	6	–	0	–	0	8	–	4	–	0
Utah State	4	–	2	–	0	6	–	5	–	0
Long Beach State	3	–	3	–	0	8	–	4	–	0
Fresno State	3	–	3	–	0	7	–	4	–	0
San Jose State	3	–	3	–	0	5	–	6	–	0
Pacific (CA)	2	–	4	–	0	4	–	8	–	0
UNLV	0	–	6	–	0	0	–	11	–	0
$ – Conference champion; Records adjusted for UNLV's forfeit of all 7 victories

The 1983 Long Beach State 49ers football team represented California State University, Long Beach (Note: The official name of Long Beach State has been California State University, Long Beach since 1972. However, it is still commonly known as Long Beach State.) during the 1983 NCAA Division I-A football season.

Cal State Long Beach competed in the Pacific Coast Athletic Association. (Note: The Big West Conference was known as the Pacific Coast Athletic Association from its founding in 1969 through 1987.) The team was led by seventh-year head coach Dave Currey, and played home games at Veterans Stadium adjacent to the campus of Long Beach City College in Long Beach, California, with one game at Anaheim Stadium in Anaheim, California . They finished the season with a record of eight wins and four losses (8–4, 3–3 PCAA).

== Schedule ==
Date	Time	Opponent	Site	Result	Attendance	Source
September 3	5:00 pm	at Kansas State*	KSU Stadium; Manhattan, KS	W 28–20	28,700	
September 10	1:00 pm	Cal State Fullerton	Anaheim Stadium; Anaheim, CA	L 19–25	5,980	
September 17	10:30 pm	at Hawaii*	Aloha Stadium; Halawa, HI	W 23–21	46,350	
October 1	7:30 pm	Texas A&I*	Veterans Memorial Stadium; Long Beach, CA	W 46–10	4,287	
October 8	1:30 pm	at San Diego State*	Jack Murphy Stadium; San Diego, CA	W 20–13	25,232	
October 15	7:30 pm	at Pacific (CA)	Pacific Memorial Stadium; Stockton, CA	W 28–16	8,100	
October 22	1:30 pm	San Jose State	Veterans Memorial Stadium; Long Beach, CA	L 9–18	6,636	
October 29	1:30 pm	at Eastern Washington*	Joe Albi Stadium; Spokane, WA	L 17–20	2,200	
November 5	12:30 pm	at Montana*	Dornblaser Field; Missoula, MT	W 38–14	7,125	
November 12	1:30 pm	Fresno State^{†}	Veterans Memorial Stadium; Long Beach, CA	L 3–7	2,017	
November 19	1:00 pm	at UNLV	Las Vegas Silver Bowl; Whitney, NV	W 24–21	17,955	
November 25	1:30 pm	Utah State	Veterans Memorial Stadium; Long Beach, CA	W 6–3	3,878	
*Non-conference game; ^{†}Homecoming; All times are in Pacific time

== Team players in the NFL ==
The following were selected in the 1984 NFL draft.

Player	Position	Round	Overall	NFL team
David Howard	Linebacker	3	67	Minnesota Vikings
John Puzar	Center	8	216	Seattle Seahawks

The following finished their Cal State Long Beach career in 1983, were not drafted, but played in the NFL.

Player	Position	First NFL Team
Scott Byers	Defensive back	1984 San Diego Chargers
