= 1983 Pacific Tigers football team =

American college football season

1983 Pacific Tigers football
- Conference: Pacific Coast Athletic Association
- Record: 4–8 (2–4 PCAA)
- Head coach: Bob Cope (1st season)
- Home stadium: Pacific Memorial Stadium

1983 Pacific Coast Athletic Association football standings
	Conf.					Overall
Team	W		L		T	W		L		T
Cal State Fullerton $	6	–	0	–	0	8	–	4	–	0
Utah State	4	–	2	–	0	6	–	5	–	0
Long Beach State	3	–	3	–	0	8	–	4	–	0
Fresno State	3	–	3	–	0	7	–	4	–	0
San Jose State	3	–	3	–	0	5	–	6	–	0
Pacific (CA)	2	–	4	–	0	4	–	8	–	0
UNLV	0	–	6	–	0	0	–	11	–	0
$ – Conference champion; Records adjusted for UNLV's forfeit of all 7 victories

The 1983 Pacific Tigers football team represented the University of the Pacific (UOP) in the 1983 NCAA Division I-A football season as a member of the Pacific Coast Athletic Association. (Note: The Big West Conference was known as the Pacific Coast Athletic Association from its founding in 1969 through 1987.)

The team was led by head coach Bob Cope, in his first year, and played their home games at Pacific Memorial Stadium (Note: Amos Alonzo Stagg Memorial Stadium was known as Pacific Memorial Stadium from its opening in 1950 through 1987.) in Stockton, California. On the field, they finished the season with a record of three wins and nine losses (3–9, 1–5 PCAA). The Tigers were outscored by their opponents 211–347 over the season.

After the 1984 season was over, it was discovered that the UNLV Rebels had used multiple ineligible players during both the 1983 and 1984 seasons. As a result, Pacific's loss to UNLV turns into a forfeit win and their record is adjusted to 4–8, 2–4 PCAA.

== Schedule ==
Date	Opponent	Site	Result	Attendance	Source
September 3	at Oregon*	Autzen Stadium; Eugene, OR	W 21–15	26,273	
September 10	at West Virginia*	Mountaineer Field; Morgantown, WV	L 7–48	54,581	
September 17	at UNLV	Las Vegas Silver Bowl; Whitney, NV	W 7–28 (forfeit win)	16,146	
September 24	Fresno State	Pacific Memorial Stadium; Stockton, CA	L 14–34	16,234	
October 1	Cal State Fullerton	Glover Stadium; Anaheim, CA	L 14–31	5,000	
October 8	Utah State	Pacific Memorial Stadium; Stockton, CA	L 10–27	9,500	
October 15	Long Beach State	Pacific Memorial Stadium; Stockton, CA	L 16–28	8,100	
October 22	Northern Arizona*	Pacific Memorial Stadium; Stockton, CA	W 28–14	7,000	
October 29	No. 19 Idaho*^{†}	Pacific Memorial Stadium; Stockton, CA	L 19–31	11,500	
November 5	at Nevada*	Mackay Stadium; Reno, NV	L 24–34	8,174	
November 12	at San Jose State	Spartan Stadium; San Jose, CA (Victory Bell)	W 30–26	12,236	
November 19	at Hawaii*	Aloha Stadium; Halawa, HI	L 21–31	38,290	
*Non-conference game; ^{†}Homecoming; Rankings from NCAA Division I-AA Football Committee Poll released prior to the game

== Team players in the NFL ==
The following UOP players were selected in the 1984 NFL draft.

Player	Position	Round	Overall	NFL team
Lionel Manuel	Wide receiver	7	171	New York Giants
