= 1983 San Jose State Spartans football team =

American college football season

1983 San Jose State Spartans football
- Conference: Pacific Coast Athletic Association
- Record: 5–6 (3–3 PCAA)
- Head coach: Jack Elway (5th season)
- Home stadium: Spartan Stadium

1983 Pacific Coast Athletic Association football standings
	Conf.					Overall
Team	W		L		T	W		L		T
Cal State Fullerton $	6	–	0	–	0	8	–	4	–	0
Utah State	4	–	2	–	0	6	–	5	–	0
Long Beach State	3	–	3	–	0	8	–	4	–	0
Fresno State	3	–	3	–	0	7	–	4	–	0
San Jose State	3	–	3	–	0	5	–	6	–	0
Pacific (CA)	2	–	4	–	0	4	–	8	–	0
UNLV	0	–	6	–	0	0	–	11	–	0
$ – Conference champion; Records adjusted for UNLV's forfeit of all 7 victories

The 1983 San Jose State Spartans football team represented San Jose State University during the 1983 NCAA Division I-A football season as a member of the Pacific Coast Athletic Association. (Note: The Big West Conference was known as the Pacific Coast Athletic Association from its founding in 1969 through 1987.) The team was led by head coach Jack Elway, in his fifth year at San Jose State. They played home games at Spartan Stadium in San Jose, California. The Spartans finished the 1983 season with a record of five wins and six losses (5–6, 3–3 PCAA).

== Schedule ==
Date	Opponent	Site	TV	Result	Attendance	Source
September 10	UNLV	Spartan Stadium; San Jose, CA		W 31–26	15,127	
September 17	at California*	California Memorial Stadium; Berkeley, CA		L 9–30	40,241	
September 24	at Stanford*	Stanford Stadium; Stanford, CA (rivalry)		W 23–10	68,201	
October 1	Oregon*	Spartan Stadium; San Jose, CA		W 44–34	20,109	
October 8	at Fresno State	Bulldog Stadium; Fresno, CA (rivalry)		W 41–23	35,000	
October 15	Cal State Fullerton^{†}	Spartan Stadium; San Jose, CA		L 11–20	21,318	
October 22	at Long Beach State	Veterans Memorial Stadium; Long Beach, CA		W 18–9	6,636	
November 5	at Utah State	Romney Stadium; Logan, UT		L 15–22	9,181	
November 12	Pacific (CA)	Spartan Stadium; San Jose, CA (Victory Bell)		L 26–30	12,236	
November 19	at Arizona State*	Sun Devil Stadium; Tempe, AZ	TBS	L 17–24	66,285	
November 26	Southwestern Louisiana*	Spartan Stadium; San Jose, CA		L 21–25	9,221	
*Non-conference game; ^{†}Homecoming

== Team players in the NFL ==
The following were selected in the 1984 NFL draft.

Player	Position	Round	Overall	NFL team
Eric Richardson	Wide receiver	2	41	Buffalo Bills
Bobby Johnson	Running back	11	285	Kansas City Chiefs

The following finished their college career in 1983, were not drafted, but played in the NFL.

Player	Position	First NFL team
Carl Sullivan	Defensive end	1987 Green Bay Packers
Sherman Cocroft	Defensive back	1985 Kansas City Chiefs
