= 1983 Cal State Fullerton Titans football team =

American college football season

1983 Cal State Fullerton Titans football

PCAA champion

California Bowl, L 13–20 vs. Northern Illinois
- Conference: Pacific Coast Athletic Association
- Record: 8–4 (6–0 PCAA)
- Head coach: Gene Murphy (4th season)
- Defensive coordinator: Bob Burt (4th season)
- Home stadium: Anaheim Stadium; Glover Stadium

1983 Pacific Coast Athletic Association football standings
	Conf.					Overall
Team	W		L		T	W		L		T
Cal State Fullerton $	6	–	0	–	0	8	–	4	–	0
Utah State	4	–	2	–	0	6	–	5	–	0
Long Beach State	3	–	3	–	0	8	–	4	–	0
Fresno State	3	–	3	–	0	7	–	4	–	0
San Jose State	3	–	3	–	0	5	–	6	–	0
Pacific (CA)	2	–	4	–	0	4	–	8	–	0
UNLV	0	–	6	–	0	0	–	11	–	0
$ – Conference champion; Records adjusted for UNLV's forfeit of all 7 victories

The 1983 Cal State Fullerton Titans football team represented California State University, Fullerton as a member of the Pacific Coast Athletic Association (PCAA) during the 1983 NCAA Division I-A football season. Led by fourth-year head coach Gene Murphy, Cal State Fullerton finished the season with an overall record of 7–5 and a mark of 5–1 in conference play, winning the PCAA title. As conference champion, the Titans were invited to play in the California Bowl in Fresno, California against the champion of the Mid-American Conference (MAC), Northern Illinois. Cal State Fullerton lost the game, 20–13.

Cal State Fullerton home stadium in 1983 was supposed to be Anaheim Stadium in Anaheim, California. However, only one of the three home games was played there. The other two games were moved to Glover Stadium in Anaheim due to weather issues.

After the 1984 season was over, it was discovered that the UNLV Rebels had used multiple ineligible players during both the 1983 and 1984 seasons. As a result, UNLV forfeited their victory over Cal State Fuller in 1983, improve the Titans' record to 8–4 overall and 6–0 PCAA play.

== Schedule ==
Date	Opponent	Site	Result	Attendance	Source
September 3	at Boise State*	Broncos Stadium; Boise, ID	W 13–10	18,700	
September 10	Long Beach State	Anaheim Stadium; Anaheim, CA	W 25–19	5,980	
September 17	at Utah State	Romney Stadium; Logan, UT	W 25–24	11,933	
September 24	at Arizona*	Arizona Stadium; Tucson, AZ	L 10–27	43,107	
October 1	Pacific (CA)	Glover Stadium; Anaheim, CA	W 31–14	5,000	
October 8	at Nevada*	Mackay Stadium; Reno, NV	W 14–6	9,050	
October 15	at San Jose State	Spartan Stadium; San Jose, CA	W 20–11	21,318	
October 22	at Fresno State	Bulldog Stadium; Fresno, CA	W 18–17	26,903	
October 29	at No. 15 Idaho State*	ASISU Minidome; Pocatello, ID	L 10–43	8,215	
November 5	at Utah*	Rice Stadium; Salt Lake City, UT	L 20–47	26,131	
November 12	UNLV	Glover Stadium; Anaheim, CA	W 0–13 (forfeit win)	7,000	
December 17	Northern Illinois*	Bulldog Stadium; Fresno, CA (California Bowl)	L 13–20	20,464	
*Non-conference game; Rankings from AP (NCAA Division I-AA) Poll released prior to the game

== Team players in the NFL ==
The following Cal State Fullerton players were selected in the 1984 NFL draft.

Player	Position	Round	Overall	NFL team
Lee Miller	Defensive back	9	239	San Francisco 49ers
