= 1983 California Bowl =

Northern Illinois Huskies	Cal State Fullerton Titans
(9–2)	(7–4)
20	13
Head coach: Bill Mallory	Head coach: Gene Murphy
	1	2	3	4	Total
Northern Illinois	3	7	7	3	20
Cal State Fullerton	3	7	0	3	13
- Date: December 17, 1983
- Season: 1983
- Stadium: Bulldog Stadium
- Location: Fresno, California
- Referee: Percy Penn (SWC)
- Attendance: 20,464

United States TV coverage
- Network: ESPN/Mizlou Network
- Announcers: Fred White and Ken Willard

The 1983 California Bowl was an American college football bowl game played on December 17, 1983 at Bulldog Stadium in Fresno, CA. The game pitted the Northern Illinois Huskies and the Cal State Fullerton Titans.

== Background ==
The Huskies from DeKalb, Illinois, coached by Bill Mallory, started the season with non-conference games versus Kansas and Wisconsin, with a win over the former, a loss to the latter. The Huskies then won their first six conference games, before a 30–14 loss to Central Michigan. Wins over Toledo and Ohio helped seal the Mid-American Conference title with an 8–1 conference record, edging out Toledo, Bowling Green, and Central Michigan, which all had 7–2 records. It was the Huskies' first conference title since 1965. This was the school's first major bowl game appearance and first bowl game since the Mineral Water Bowl in 1965.

Cal State Fullerton, coached by Gene Murphy, started the season with three straight victories over Boise State and conference opponents Long Beach State and Utah State. A loss to #4 Arizona was their last loss for a month, as they beat Pacific, Nevada, San Jose State and Fresno State to improve their record to 7–1, the most wins for the program in a season since 1973. However, they finished the season with three straight losses to Idaho State, Utah, and UNLV. The Titans' 5–1 record in the Big West Conference was good enough for the first conference title in school history and to qualify for their first bowl game in their 14th season of play.

== Game summary ==
- Northern Illinois - Vince Scott 23 yard field goal, 1st 9:18 (12-71, 5:42)
- Cal State Fullerton - Greg Steinke 26 yard field goal, 1st 5:57 (8-67, 3:21)
- Northern Illinois - Darryl Richardson 3 yard touchdown run (Scott kick), 2nd 8:53 (15-60, 5:57)
- Cal State Fullerton - Corn Redick 25 yard touchdown pass from Damon Allen (Steinke kick), 2nd 6:11 (6-80, 2:42)
- Northern Illinois - Darryl Richardson 4 yard touchdown run (Scott kick), 3rd 3:13 (5-45, 2:17)
- Northern Illinois - Vince Scott 42 yard field goal, 4th 12:09 (7-30, 3:20)
- Cal State Fullerton - Greg Steinke 40 yard field goal, 4th 7:03 (11-54, 5:06)

Darryl Richardson rushed for 67 yards on 21 carries for two touchdowns as Northern Illinois edged Cal State Fullerton on his touchdown in the third quarter to break a 10-10 halftime score. The Huskies rushed for 253 yards (on 53 carries) while the Titans rushed for 146 yards (on 30 carries). NIU threw for 119 yards, Fullerton for 233 yards. Neither team had any turnovers or sacks; both had 9 penalties (NIU for 75 yards, Cal State Fullerton for 85 yards). The Huskies had 55 kickoff return yards and 13 punt return yards while the Titans had 71 kickoff return yards and 18 punt return yards. NIU edged out Cal State Fullerton in possession time 33:33 to 26:27, and were 8/14 on third Downs compared to Cal State Fullerton's 6/16 on 3rd down (both teams were 1 of 2 on third down).

For the Huskies, Tim Tyrrell went 10-of-18 for 119 yards while rushing for 37 yards on 14 runs. Lou Wicks rushed for 117 yards on 14 carries, with 2 catches for 22 yards and was voted the game's outstanding player. For the Titans, Damon Allen threw 18-of-32 for 233 yards and one touchdown while rushing for six yards on nine runs.

== Aftermath ==
The Huskies did not reach a bowl game again until 2004. The Titans went 11–1 the following season, with a loss to conference member UNLV being their only loss, which meant that they shared the conference title, though UNLV was invited to the California Bowl over them. UNLV would later forfeit the victory due to using ineligible players. The Titans finished second in the conference four times in the five years following that. The program soon stagnated, going 1–11 by 1990, with financial trouble hurting the program. 1992 was their final season, and the program went 2–9 to end a 22-year history. This was their only bowl game appearance.
