= Gene Murphy (American football, born 1939) =

American football player and coach (1939–2011)

Biographical details
- Born: August 6, 1939; New Brunswick, New Jersey, U.S.
- Died: October 29, 2011 (aged 72); Los Angeles, California, U.S.

Playing career
- 1960–1962: North Dakota
- Position: Quarterback

Coaching career (HC unless noted)
- 1963–1977: North Dakota (assistant)
- 1978–1979: North Dakota
- 1980–1992: Cal State Fullerton
- 1993–2007: Fullerton

Head coaching record
- Overall: 74–96–1 (college); 80–75–2 (junior college)
- Bowls: 0–1 (college); 4–2 (junior college)
- Tournaments: 0–1 (NCAA D-II playoffs); 2–1 (CCCAA playoffs)

Accomplishments and honors

Championships
- 1 NCC (1979); 1 PCAA (1983); 1 Mission Conference (2003); 1 Mission Conference National Division (2003)

Eugene Vincent Murphy (August 6, 1939 – October 29, 2011) was an American football player and coach. He served as the head football coach at the University of North Dakota from 1978 to 1979 and at California State University, Fullerton from 1980 to 1992, compiling a career college football coaching record 74–96–1.

== Early years ==
Born and raised in New Brunswick, New Jersey, Murphy's father was a football coach. He was an all-state quarterback and shortstop in high school. He initially attended the University of Minnesota, then transferred to the University of North Dakota in Grand Forks, and played college football as a quarterback for the UND Fighting Sioux from 1960 to 1962.

== Coaching ==
Murphy then moved into an assistant coaching position with the team, where he remained until 1977. Murphy later was the UND head coach in 1978 to 1979. The team went 15–7 in his two seasons, winning the North Central Conference and advancing to the Division II playoffs in 1979. He was succeeded at North Dakota by one of his assistants, Pat Behrns.

In 1980, Murphy became head coach at California State University, Fullerton in Orange County. He led the Titans for thirteen years and was their final coach; the program was discontinued after the 1992 season. The Titans won the Pacific Coast Athletic Association championships in 1983 and 1984. The 1984 team was ranked in the National Top 20 and finished 12-0.

His assistants included future National Football League (NFL) head coaches Steve Mariucci, Tom Cable, and Hue Jackson. Notable former players include Damon Allen, Mike Pringle, Bobby Kemp, Mark Collins, and James Thornton. In 1999, Murphy was inducted into both the University of North Dakota Hall of Fame, and was inducted to the Cal State Fullerton Athletics Hall of Fame in 2009.

After Cal State Fullerton dropped its football program, Murphy served as head coach at Fullerton College from 1993 to 2007. He remained a consultant with the program until his death.

== Death ==
Murphy died at age 72 in 2011 at USC Hospital in Los Angeles, four days after surgery for esophageal cancer. He had seemed to be recuperating from the surgery when he had a heart attack. He was survived by his daughter Aileen, her mother Christine McCarthy, his two adult sons, Tim and Mike, and his four grandchildren. Murphy's funeral service was held at St. Juliana’s Catholic Church. He was buried in Fullerton at Loma Vista Memorial Park.

== Head coaching record ==
=== College ===
Year	Team	Overall	Conference	Standing	Bowl/playoffs
North Dakota Fighting Sioux (North Central Conference) (1978–1979)
1978	North Dakota	5–5	3–3	T–3rd	
1979	North Dakota	10–2	5–1	1st	L NCAA Division II Quarterfinal
North Dakota:		15–7	8–4		
Cal State Fullerton Titans (Pacific Coast Athletic Association / Big West Conference) (1980–1992)
1980	Cal State Fullerton	4–7	1–4	T–4th	
1981	Cal State Fullerton	3–8	1–4	T–5th	
1982	Cal State Fullerton	3–9	0–5	7th	
1983	Cal State Fullerton	7–5	5–1	1st	L California
1984	Cal State Fullerton	12–0	7–0	1st	
1985	Cal State Fullerton	6–5	5–2	2nd	
1986	Cal State Fullerton	3–9	2–5	T–6th	
1987	Cal State Fullerton	6–6	4–3	T–2nd	
1988	Cal State Fullerton	5–6	5–2	2nd	
1989	Cal State Fullerton	6–4–1	5–2	T–2nd	
1990	Cal State Fullerton	1–11	0–7	8th	
1991	Cal State Fullerton	2–9	1–6	8th	
1992	Cal State Fullerton	2–9	0–6	7th	
Cal State Fullerton:		60–88–1	36–47		
Total:		75–95–1			
National championship Conference title Conference division title or championship game berth

=== Junior college ===
Year	Team	Overall	Conference	Standing	Bowl/playoffs	CCCAA^{#}
Fullerton Hornets (Mission Conference) (1993–2007)
1993	Fullerton	3–7	0–5	6th (Central)		
1994	Fullerton	7–3–1	5–1	2nd (Central)	W Western State K-Swiss Bowl	23
1995	Fullerton	4–5–1	4–2	T–2nd (Central)		
1996	Fullerton	5–5	3–3	T–4th (Central)		
1997	Fullerton	5–5	3–3	T–4th (Central)		
1998	Fullerton	3–7	2–3	T–3rd (Central)		
1999	Fullerton	3–7	2–3	T–3rd (Central)		
2000	Fullerton	4–6	3–2	2nd (Central)		
2001	Fullerton	6–5	3–2	3rd (Central)	L US Bank Beach Bowl	
2002	Fullerton	3–7	1–4	5th (Central)		
2003	Fullerton	10–3	5–0	1st (National)	W US Bank Beach Bowl, L CCCAA National Championship	
2004	Fullerton	7–4	2–3	T–3rd (National)	W Golden Empire Bowl	
2005	Fullerton	8–3	3–2	3rd (American)	L Golden Empire Bowl	
2006	Fullerton	5–5	3–2	3rd (American)		
2007	Fullerton	7–3	2–2	4th (American)	W Orange County Bowl	
Fullerton:		80–75–2	41–37			
Total:		80–75–2				
National championship Conference title Conference division title or championship game berth
