= Glover Stadium/Dee Fee Field =

Stadium in Anaheim, California

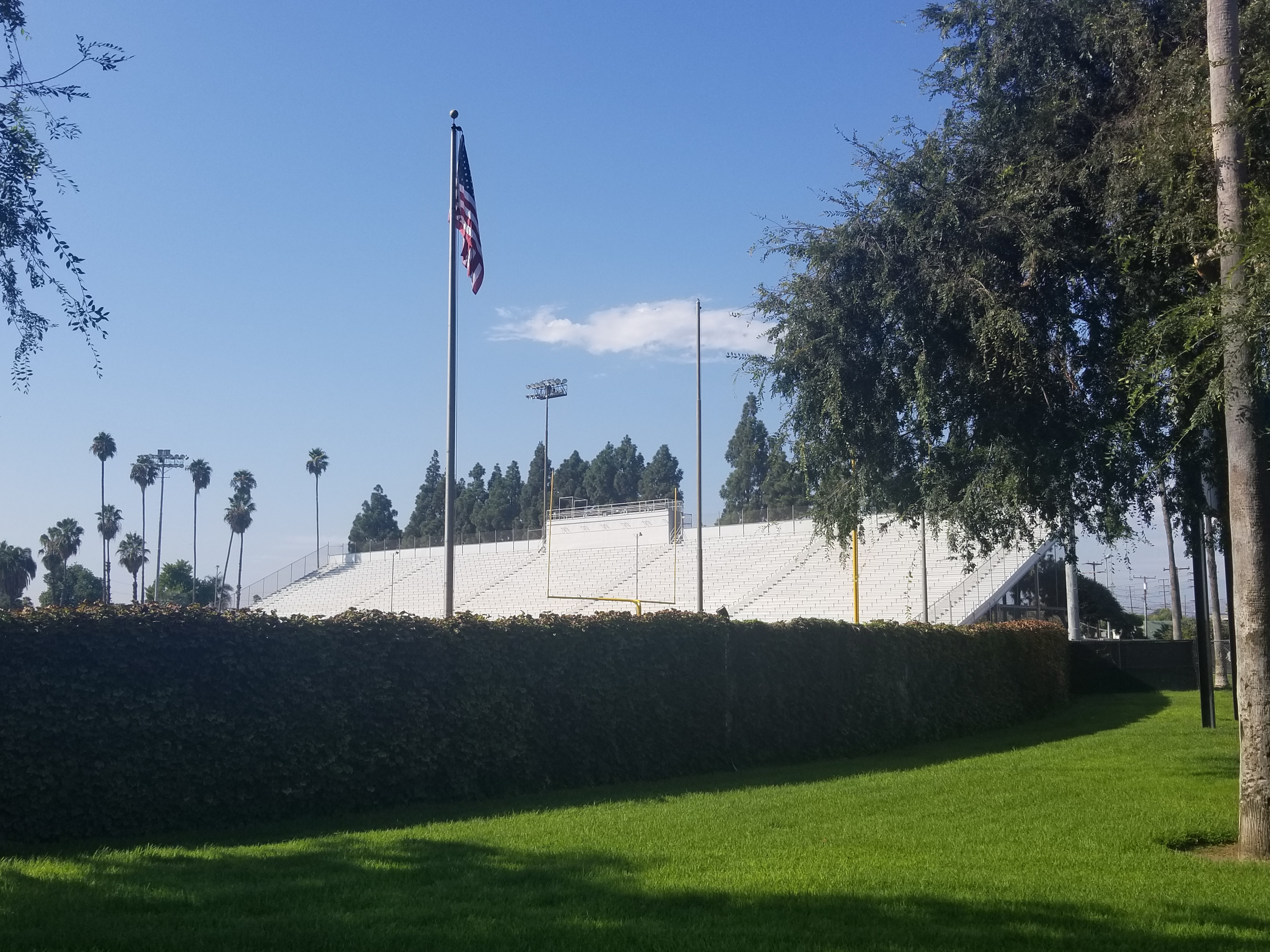
- Interactive map of Glover Stadium/Dee Fee Field
- Former names: La Palma Park (1939–1970); La Palma Stadium (1956–1970)
- Location: 1125 N. La Palma Pkwy. Anaheim, California; United States
- Coordinates: 33.84835°N 117.92113°W
- Owner: City of Anaheim
- Operator: City of Anaheim Parks Department
- Capacity: Baseball: 700; Football/Soccer: 5,200
- Surface: Natural Grass
- Field size: Left Field Line: 370 ft. Left Center Field: 342 ft. Center Field: 352 ft. Right Field Line: 359 ft.

Construction
- Groundbreaking: December 16, 1937
- Opened: March 1939
- Renovated: 1956

Tenants
- Baseball * American Legion Baseball; *California Interscholastic Federation * Sacramento Senators (PCL) (spring training) (1939) * Philadelphia Athletics (AL) (spring training) (1940-1942) * Anaheim Aces (CAL) (1941) * St. Louis Browns (AL) (spring training) (1946) * Anaheim Valencias (SUN) (1947–48); Football * California Interscholastic Federation * Cal State Fullerton football (NCAA) (1983)

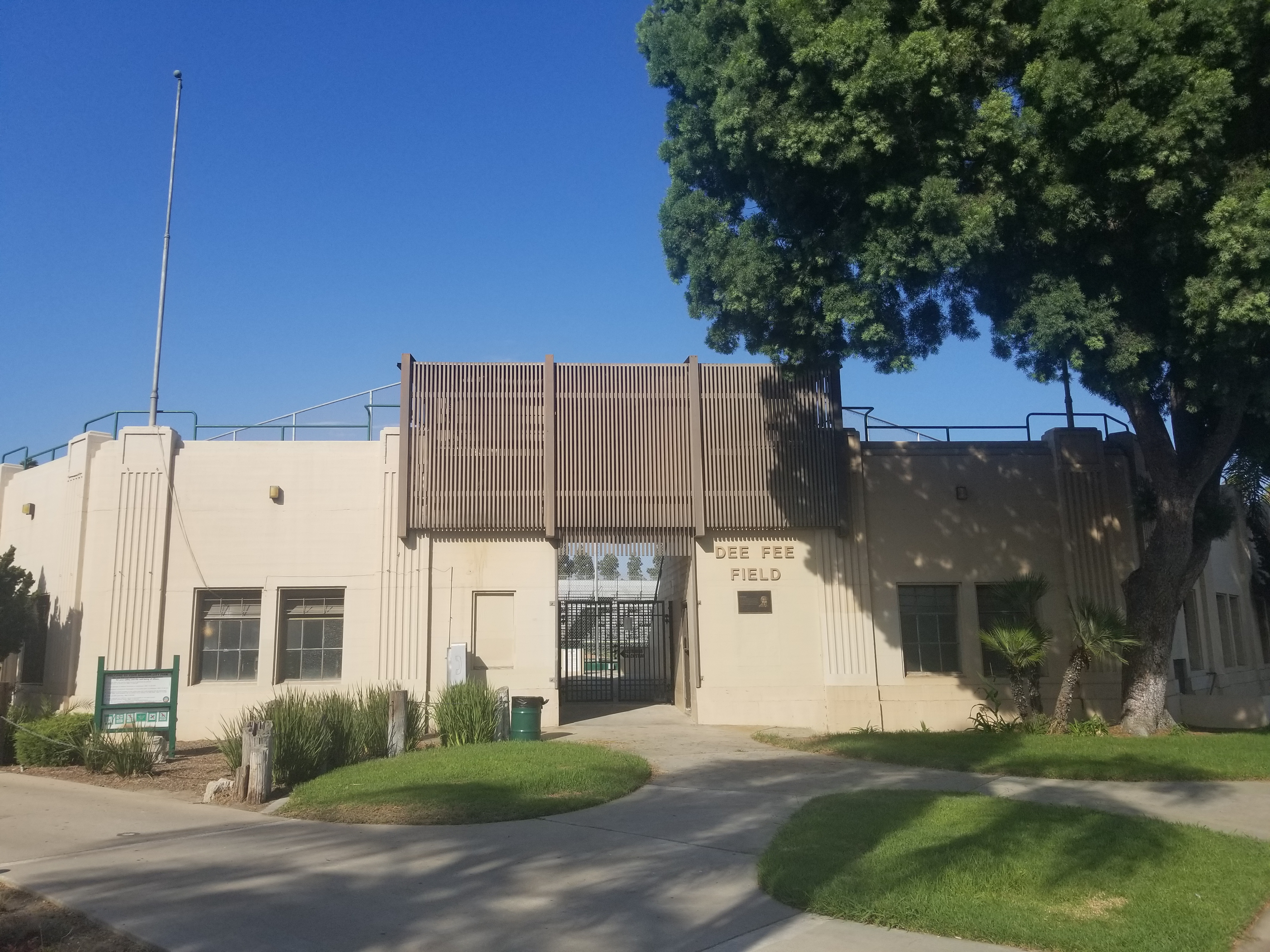

Glover Stadium/Dee Fee Field is a stadium in Anaheim, California located in La Palma Park. It is a combined multi-purpose stadium primarily used for baseball and football in addition to soccer. The seating capacity for baseball is 700 and 5,200 for football and soccer.

== History ==
Stadium construction began on December 16, 1937, and was completed in March 1939. The original name of the stadium was the same as the park in which it is located, La Palma Park. Funding for the stadium was provided by the Works Progress Administration.

The stadium was renovated in 1956 with the Anaheim City Council deciding it would be cheaper to add grandstands to La Palma Park rather than to build a new football stadium. Grandstands were constructed across the outfield from left field to right-center reducing the size of the baseball field. The football stadium was named La Palma Stadium.

The football stadium was renamed Glover Stadium in 1971 after Richard Glover, an assistant and head football coach at Anaheim High School from 1931 until 1957. The baseball field was renamed Dee Fee Field in 1987 after Dee Fee, who worked for the Anaheim Parks Department from 1937 to 1987. In addition to baseball and football, the stadium has played host to soccer games, rodeos, circuses and area high school graduations.

=== Baseball history ===
The first event at the stadium was a baseball game on March 12, 1939. It was a Pacific Coast League spring training game between the Seattle Rainiers and Sacramento Senators. The Sacramento team trained at the stadium and played ten spring training games in 1939. The stadium was the spring training home of the Philadelphia Athletics from 1940 to 1942. It was also the spring training home of the St. Louis Browns for the 1946 season.

La Palma Park was the home of the Anaheim Aces, a charter member of baseball's Class C California League in 1941. The stadium was also home of the Class C Anaheim Valencias of the Sunset League from 1947 to 1948.

In addition to hosting minor league and major league games, the stadium hosts American Legion Baseball and California Interscholastic Federation high school baseball games.

=== Football history ===
The first football game at the stadium was a contest between Anaheim High School and Redlands High School on September 21, 1956. It has continued to be used as a venue for California Interscholastic Federation high school football since that time.

The stadium has hosted community college and NCAA Division I college football games. In 1983, the Cal State Fullerton Titans football team played two of their three home football games at the stadium. The first game was on October 1, 1983, versus the Pacific Tigers. The second contest was on November 12, 1983, against the UNLV Rebels football team. The games were played at the stadium due to rainy weather and field conditions at Cal State Fullerton's home football stadium, Anaheim Stadium.

=== Rugby union ===
In January 1976 the United States national rugby union team played Australia at the stadium with approximately 7,000 fans in attendance. Australia won the game 24–12. The match was the first game played by the USA team after the formation of USA Rugby.

== Cultural history ==
On March 8, 1961, the stadium hosted Fred Schwarz's School of Anti-Communism across 5 days and drew over 16,000 people. It was organized by Walter Knott, Robert Schuller and other Orange County businessmen.

In June 2020, a Black Lives Matter rally of 2,000 people was held outside of the stadium.

== Gallery ==
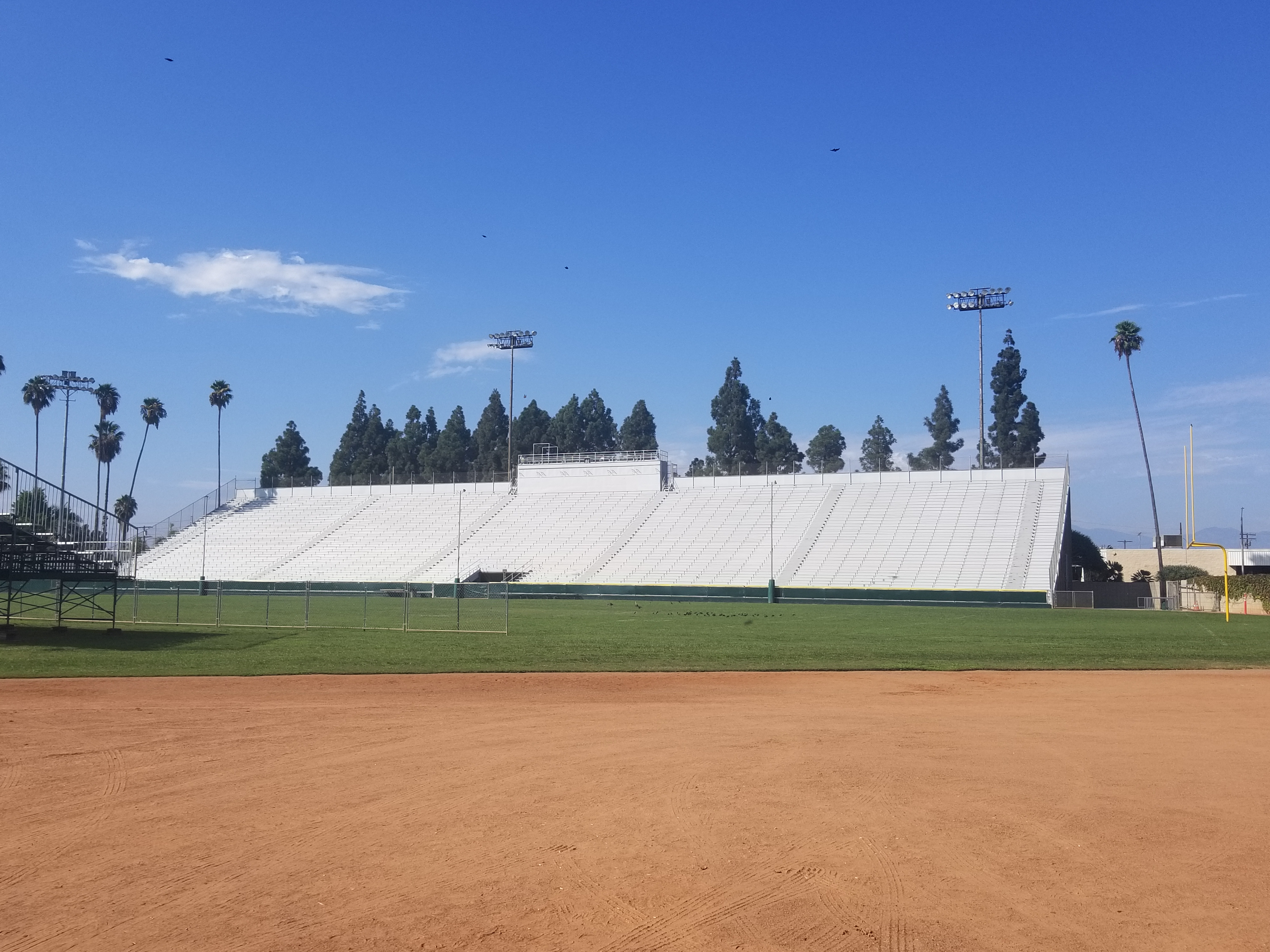
Glover Stadium grandstand

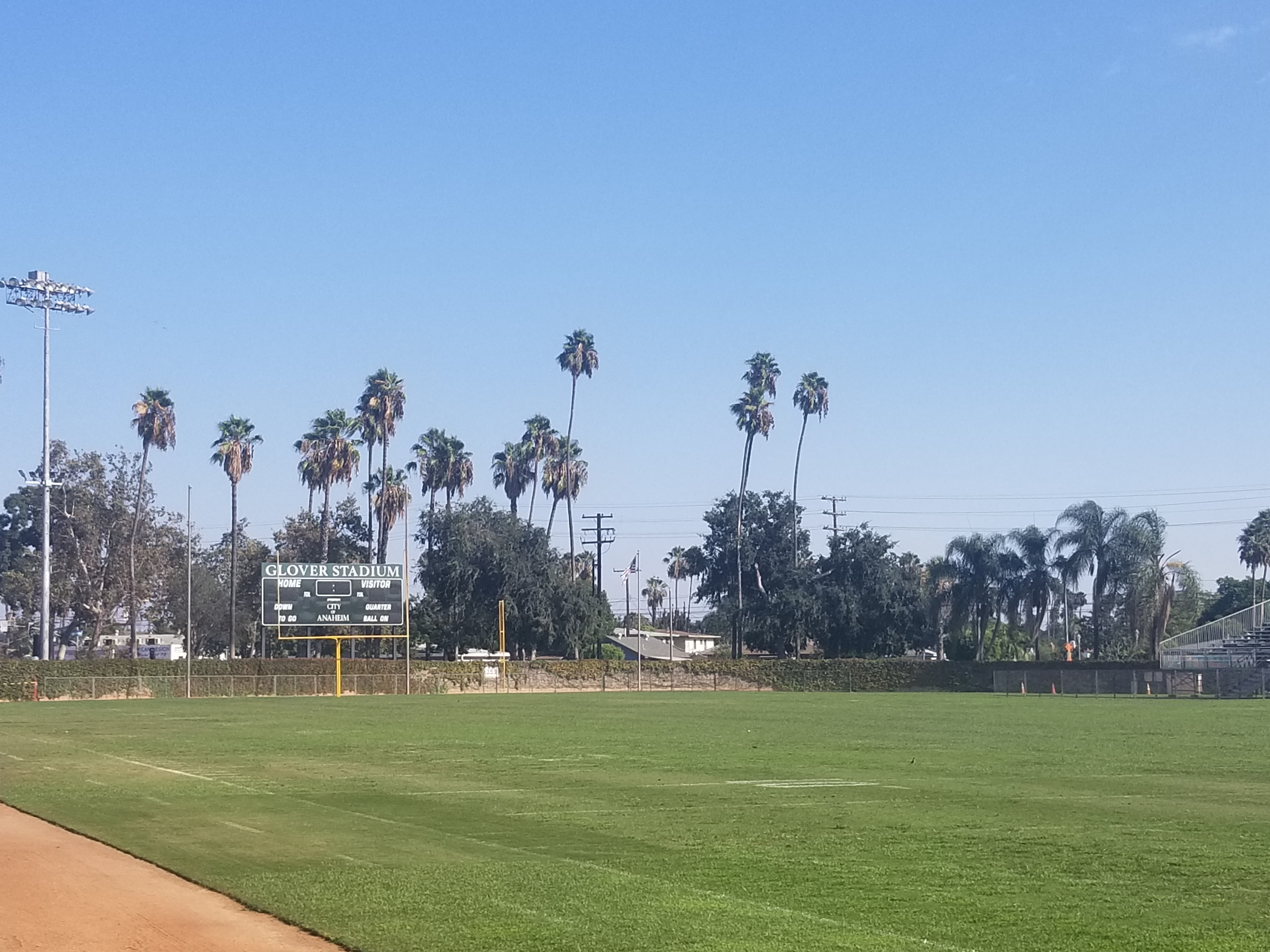
Glover Stadium scoreboard

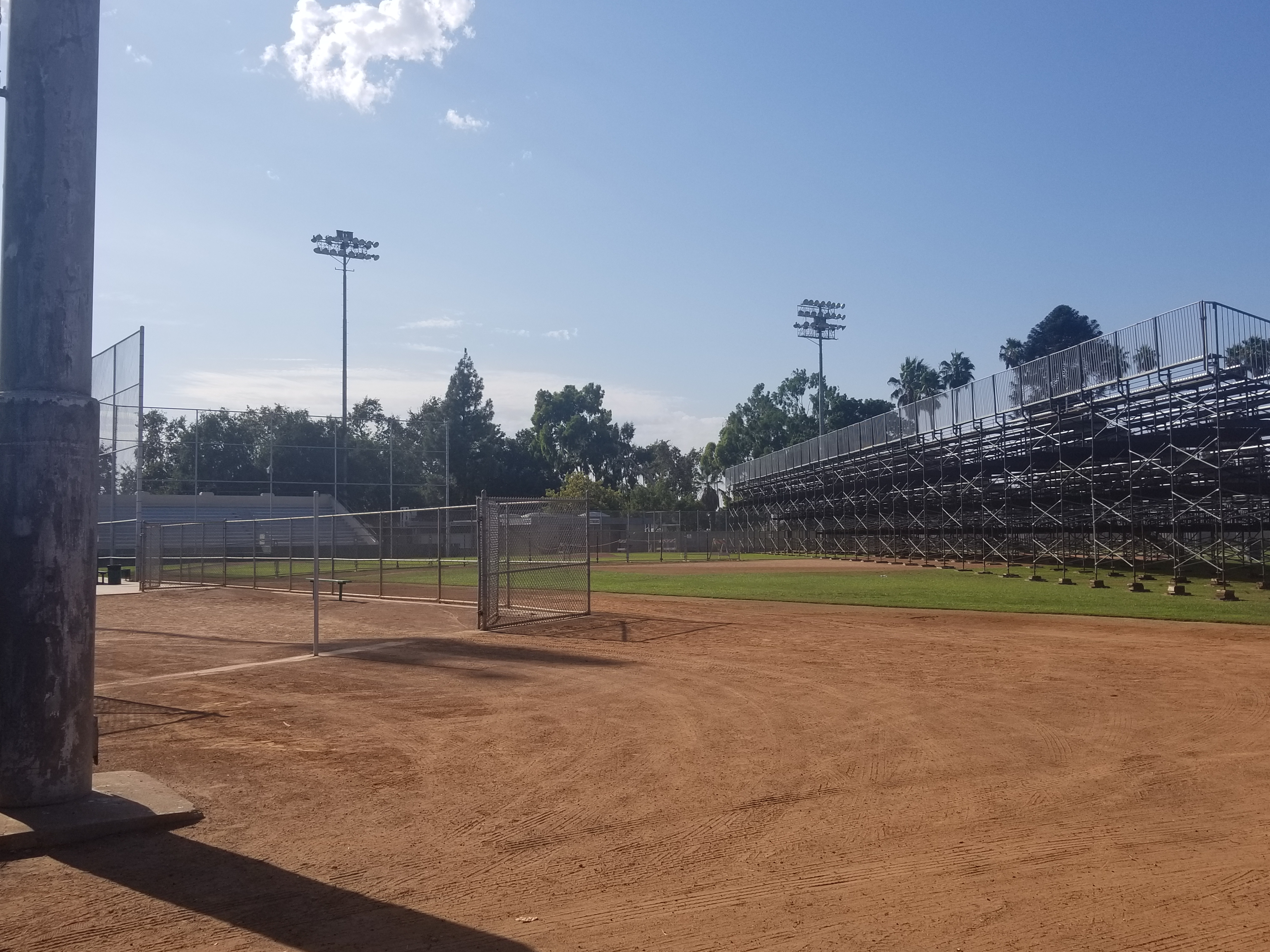
Dee Fee Field (football stands constructed on baseball infield)

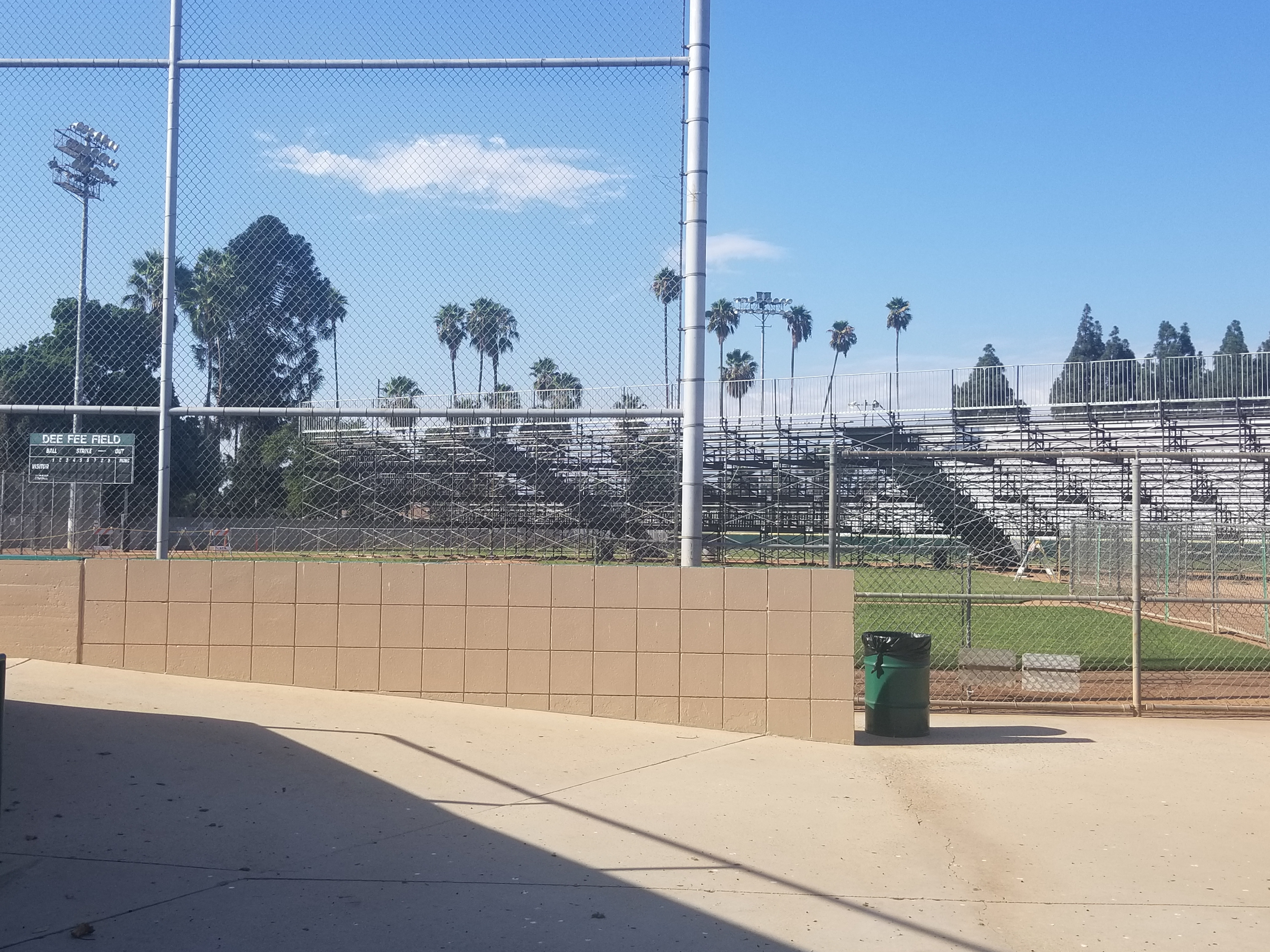
Dee Fee Field scoreboard (football stands constructed on baseball infield)
