= Harvey Hyde =

American sports journalist and football coach

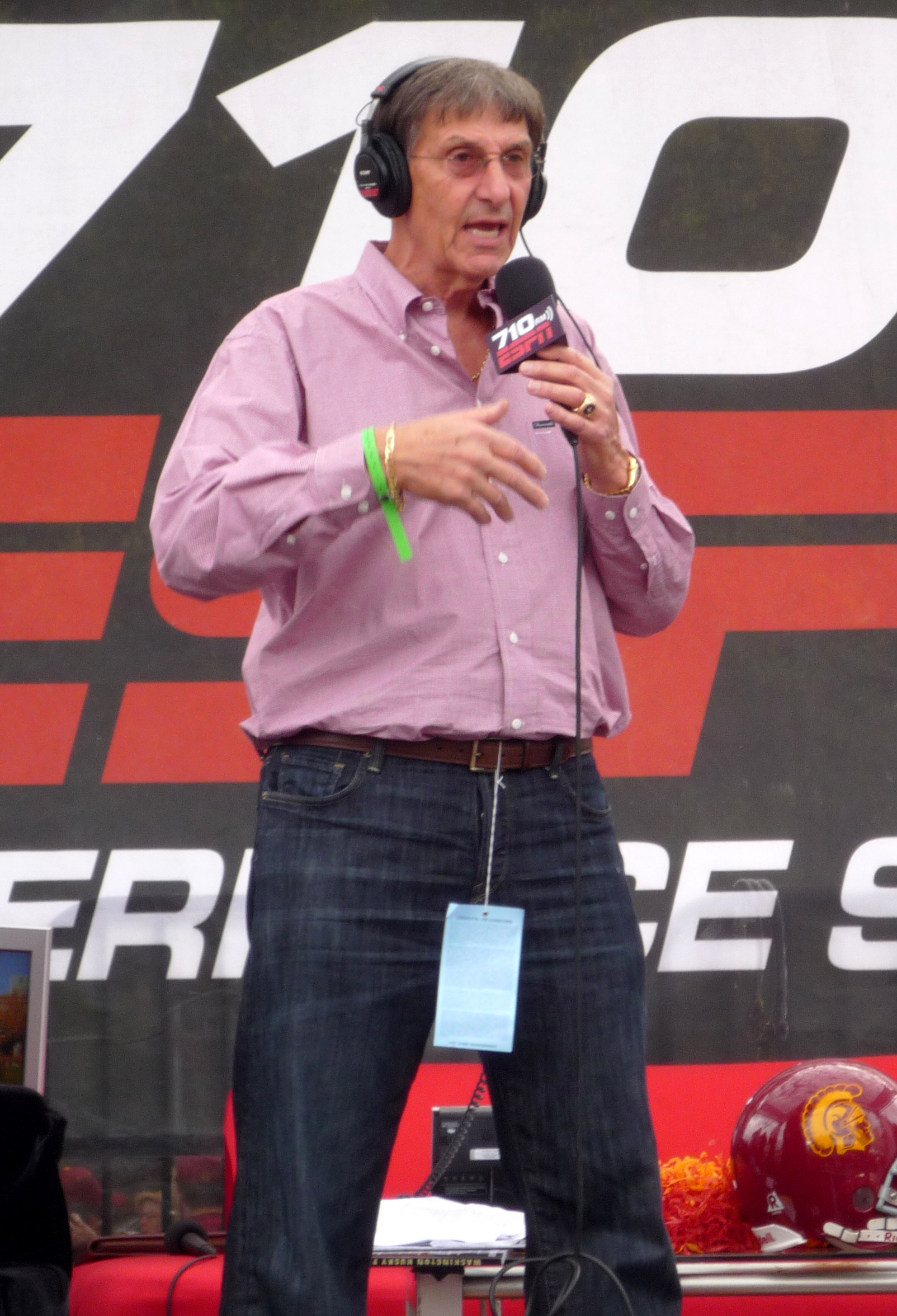
- Hyde during a broadcast of the "USC Gameday Show" for ESPN Radio 710

Biographical details
- Born: July 13, 1939 (age 87); Pasadena, California, U.S
- Education: University of Redlands

Playing career
- 1959–1960: Pasadena
- Position: Tackle

Coaching career (HC unless noted)
- 1962: Redlands (freshmen)
- 1963–1964: Norte Vista HS (CA) (DC)
- 1965–1966: Pasadena (assistant)
- 1967: Hawaii (assistant)
- 1968–1969: Pasadena (co-HC)
- 1970–1978: Pasadena (assistant)
- 1979–1981: Pasadena
- 1982–1985: UNLV
- 1990: Long Beach State (associate HC)

Head coaching record
- Overall: 8–37–1 (college); 33–17 (junior college)
- Bowls: 0–1 (college); 1–1 (junior college)

Accomplishments and honors

Championships
- 2 Metropolitan Conference (1979–1980); 1 PCAA (1984)

Harvey Leslie Hyde (born July 13, 1939) is an American sports journalist and former football coach. He served as the head football coach at the University of Nevada, Las Vegas (UNLV) from 1982 to 1985. Hyde also had two stints as head football coach at Pasadena City College in Pasadena, California, from 1968 to 1969, in a shared role with Myron Tarkanian, and 1979 to 1981.

== Early life and playing career ==
Hyde was born in Pasadena, California. He graduated from Pasadena High School and Pasadena City College, where he played football as a tackle and earned all-conference honors. Hyde received a bachelor's and master's degree from the University of Redlands.

== Coaching career ==
Hyde began his coaching career at Redlands in 1962 as coach of the freshman football team. In 1963 and 1964, he served as defensive coordinator at Norte Vista High School in Riverside, California. Hyde returned to Pasadena City College in 1965 as an assistant football coach and faculty member. After spending 1967 as an assistant coach at the University of Hawaiʻi, Hyde returned once again to Pasadena City, where was co-head coach with Myron Tarkanian in 1968 and 1969. He remained at Pasadena City as an assistant from 1970 to 1978 before being elevated to head coach in 1979.

He went to UNLV in 1982. The Rebels improved under Hyde's tenure. In 1983, they went 7–4, a four win improvement from the last season. The following year, they had unprecedented success in the 1984 season; with star quarterback Randall Cunningham, UNLV went 11–2, won their conference title and defeated Toledo in the California Bowl. It was UNLV's only 11-win season. Hyde was at one point a candidate for the vacant head coaching position at Arizona State.

However, it was later discovered the Rebels had used ineligible players and the Pacific Coast Athletic Association (now Big West Conference) had the Rebels forfeit all the wins from the 1983 and 1984 seasons, though the wins were not stricken from NCAA and UNLV records. Although none of the ineligible players were used in the bowl game, the California Bowl was among the games forfeited. The issue erupted at the same time the university president, Robert Maxson, was in the middle of an hostile relationship with the school's famous head basketball coach, Jerry Tarkanian, over similar off-the-court issues with players. The athletic director at the time, Brad Rothermel, noted in later years that Maxson wanted to fire Hyde because of the coach's friendship with Jerry Tarkanian's brother, Myron, stating "When President Maxson discovered (that friendship), he did what he could to level the legs of the football program. We didn't recover from that." During the 1985 season, one of Hyde's players was Marion "Suge" Knight. Among his coaching staff was future Fresno State head coach Pat Hill.

Things became more difficult for the embattled coach, as nine of his players got involved in various scrapes with the law ranging from theft to assault. Finally, on April 23, 1986, Hyde was fired by Maxon with three years left on his $62,500-a-year contract, which the university said it would honor. One of his assistant coaches, Wayne Nunnely, was named interim head coach through the 1986 season, before being chosen as his permanent successor. His firing marked a period of decline for the Rebels that lasted for over three decades.

Hyde coached football one last time in 1990, as George Allen's associate head coach, recruiting coordinator and running backs coach at Long Beach State. During that year, Hyde recruited future National Football League star Terrell Davis. Their tenure would only last one season as Allen died just after the end of the regular season, in part due to weak health after his players drenched him with ice water to celebrate a season-ending victory over UNLV. In interviewing to be the permanent head coach of Long Beach State, a program which was under financial duress, Hyde offered radical ideas of having the team play only road games, recruit only junior college players and use only one set of uniforms; he was not selected and the program only lasted one more season before finally shutting down.

== After coaching ==
After football, Hyde went on to do sports radio for KSHP-AM 1400 in Las Vegas, and working as part of the USC football pregame show for ESPN Radio 710 in Los Angeles.

== Head coaching record ==
=== College ===
Year	Team	Overall	Conference	Standing	Bowl/playoffs
UNLV Rebels (Pacific Coast Athletic Association) (1982–1985)
1982	UNLV	3–8	1–4	6th	
1983	UNLV	0–11*	0–6*	7th	
1984	UNLV	0–13*	0–7*	8th	L (forfeit) California
1985	UNLV	5–5–1	4–2–1	3rd	
UNLV:		8–37–1	5–19–1		
Total:		8–37–1			

*UNLV forfeit all its wins from 1983 and 1984 seasons, including a victory 1984 California Bowl to ineligible players. Hyde's on-field record at UNLV was 26–19–1 overall and 16–8–1 in conference play.

=== Junior college football ===
Year	Team	Overall	Conference	Standing	Bowl/playoffs
Pasadena Lancers (Metropolitan Conference) (1968–1969)
1968	Pasadena	3–6	1–6	T–6th	
1969	Pasadena	5–4 (Note: Pasadena finished the 1969 season with an overall record of 8–0–1 and a mark of 6–0 in conference play, but forfeited three conference wins, over Bakersfield, El Camino, and Los Angeles Valley, and a non-conference tie with Rio Hondo because of an ineligible player.)	3–3	T–3rd	
Pasadena Lancers (Metropolitan Conference) (1979–1981)
1979	Pasadena	9–2	4–1	T–1st	W Valley Bowl
1980	Pasadena	10–1	6–0	1st	L Metro-Valley Bowl
1981	Pasadena	6–4	4–2	T–2nd	
Pasadena:		33–17	18–12		
Total:		33–17			
National championship Conference title Conference division title or championship game berth
