= Bill Ireland =

American football and baseball coach

Biographical details
- Born: April 29, 1927; McGill, Nevada, U.S.
- Died: July 31, 2007 (aged 80); Reno, Nevada, U.S.

Coaching career (HC unless noted)

Football
- 1968–1972: UNLV

Baseball
- 1966: Nevada

Administrative career (AD unless noted)
- 1973–1980: UNLV

Head coaching record
- Overall: 26–23–1 (football); 17–10–1 (baseball)

Willis Ireland (April 29, 1927 – July 31, 2007) was an American college football and baseball coach in Nevada. He was the first head coach of the UNLV Rebels football team, UNLV athletic director and founder of the Battle for the Fremont Cannon. Additionally, he was head baseball coach at the University of Nevada, Reno.

Ireland was born in remote McGill, Nevada, 330 miles (530 km) east of Reno, Nevada. As the coach of the 1966 Wolf Pack baseball team, he managed Fred Dallimore, who later coached the UNLV baseball team, and is the father of former San Francisco Giants player Brian Dallimore. In 1967 Chub Drakulich hired Ireland to start the UNLV football program. During their inaugural 1968 season, the Rebels were undefeated until the last game of the season. The Rebels lost their first match against their in-state rival, the Nevada Wolf Pack. Ireland, wanting an award to symbolize the rivalry, obtained a replica of the Howitzer John C. Fremont had brought with him in his expedition to Nevada. The first Battle for the Cannon, with UNLV avenging their loss and evening the series. After a disappointing 1–10 record in 1972, Ireland resigned his coaching position.

In 1973, Ireland became the athletic director of UNLV. In this position he hired Jerry Tarkanian as the UNLV basketball coach. He was also instrumental in the construction of both the Thomas and Mack Center in Las Vegas and the Lawlor Events Center in Reno. In 1990, his wife Jeanne Ireland was the Democratic Party's candidate for lieutenant governor; she lost by 15%.

Ireland was a member of both the UNLV and the University of Nevada, Reno Halls of Fame. On October 8, 2012, Governor Brian Sandoval announced that one student-athlete a year from the University of Nevada, Reno will receive the "Bill Ireland Award."

== Head coaching record ==
=== Football ===
Year	Team	Overall	Conference	Standing	Bowl/playoffs
Nevada Southern / UNLV Rebels (NCAA College Division independent) (1968–1972)
1968	Nevada Southern	8–1			
1969	UNLV	6–4			
1970	UNLV	6–4			
1971	UNLV	5–4–1			
1972	UNLV	1–10			
Nevada Southern / UNLV:		26–23–1			
Total:		26–23–1			
