= Jim Strong (American football coach) =

American football player and coach (born 1954)

Biographical details
- Born: November 16, 1954 (age 71)

Playing career
- 1974: Missouri Southern

Coaching career (HC unless noted)
- 1983: Arkansas (assistant)
- 1984–1986: Minnesota (assistant)
- 1987–1988: Notre Dame (RB)
- 1989: Notre Dame (OC)
- 1990–1993: UNLV

Head coaching record
- Overall: 17–27

James A. Strong (born November 16, 1954) is an American former college football coach. He was the head coach at UNLV for four seasons, and served as an assistant coach and offensive coordinator at Notre Dame.

Strong joined head coach Lou Holtz' staff at Arkansas in 1983, and followed him to Minnesota and eventually Notre Dame. At Notre Dame, Strong had a successful tenure as offensive coordinator and offensive backfield coach, including the 1988 national championship season. In December 1989, Strong was named the head coach of the football program at the University of Nevada, Las Vegas. In making the hire, the UNLV Athletic Director asserted Strong's background in recruiting, his energy, and the success of Notre Dame. His initial contract was for five-years at a salary of $95,000 a year.

Strong arrived at a UNLV program that had fallen under the shadow of the highly successful men's basketball program under Jerry Tarkanian; in his first meeting with the university Faculty Senate, he noted "They don't know us because we are a premier academic institution. We will be someday. But they know us because we've got a basketball team that won the national championship."

After leaving UNLV, Strong changed careers and became a real estate broker in Branson, Missouri.

== Head coaching record ==
| Year | Team | Overall | Conference | Standing | Bowl/playoffs |
|---|---|---|---|---|---|
UNLV Rebels (Big West Conference) (1990–1993)
| 1990 | UNLV | 4–7 | 3–4 | 5th | |
| 1991 | UNLV | 4–7 | 2–5 | T–5th | |
| 1992 | UNLV | 6–5 | 3–3 | T–4th | |
| 1993 | UNLV | 3–8 | 2–4 | T–7th | |
| UNLV: | | 17–27 | 10–16 | | |
| Total: | | 17–27 | | | |
