= 1984 California Bowl =

| Toledo Rockets | UNLV Rebels |
| (8–2–1) | (10–2) |
| 13 | 30 |
| Head coach: Dan Simrell | Head coach: Harvey Hyde |
| | 1 | 2 | 3 | 4 | Total |
|---|---|---|---|---|---|
| Toledo | 3 | 3 | 7 | 0 | 13 |
| UNLV | 7 | 6 | 17 | 0 | 30 |
- Date: December 15, 1984
- Season: 1984
- Stadium: Bulldog Stadium
- Location: Fresno, California
- Referee: Joe Thomas (SWC)
- Attendance: 21,741

United States TV coverage
- Network: ESPN

The 1984 California Bowl was an American college football bowl game played on December 15, 1984 at Bulldog Stadium in Fresno, California. The game pitted the UNLV Rebels and the Toledo Rockets.

== Background ==
The Rebels rebounded from a 7–4 year in 1983 to win the Pacific Coast Athletic Association title with a perfect conference record, with their only losses being to Hawaii and SMU. This was UNLV's first ever bowl game appearance. The Rockets started the season 5–0–1, with victories over four conference opponents and a tie at Ohio. A loss to Kent State was their only conference loss, as they finished the season with three straight conference wins (and a loss against independent Temple) to win the Mid-American Conference for the second time in four seasons.

== Game summary ==
- UNLV — Gladney 19 yard touchdown pass from Randall Cunningham (Joey DiGiovanna kick), 11:29
- Toledo — 22 yard field goal by Walker, 4:20
- UNLV — Kirk Jones 7 yard touchdown pass from Cunningham (kick failed), 9:40
- Toledo — 36 yard field goal by Walker, 0:03
- UNLV — 44 yard field goal by Joey DiGiovanna, 8:55
- Toledo — Bill Foure 38 yard touchdown pass from A. J. Sager (Walker kick), 5:29
- UNLV — Ickey Woods 16 yard touchdown run (DiGiovanna kick), 4:14
- UNLV — Randall Cunningham 10 yard touchdown run (DiGiovanna kick) 1:10

Randall Cunningham went 18-of-28 for two touchdowns, one interception and one touchdown run. UNLV had 127 rushing yards, 270 passing yards, and 77 return yards. Toledo had 203 rushing yards, 137 passing yards, and 96 return yards. UNLV turned it over three times, while Toledo turned it over once.

== Aftermath ==
After the game, it was found that UNLV had used ineligible players during the season. Although those players were not used in the bowl game, the school forfeited the win. In their record book, UNLV claims that "Victories later forfeited by rule of conference but recognized by NCAA." Toledo brings attention to this detail in their own record book by stating "NOTE: The contest was later forfeited to Toledo by the PCAA due to use of ineligible players by UNLV earlier that season. UNLV has never accepted the ruling." The NCAA simply put "^Won by forfeit," next to Toledo's name on the final score of the game in their record books. Toledo was given the trophy from the game, though when the two teams met years later, the trophy was evidently lost. Both teams underwent bowl droughts after this game, with the Rebels not going to a bowl game again until the 1994 Las Vegas Bowl and the Rockets not going to a bowl game until the 1995 Las Vegas Bowl. Both teams won their games, the Las Vegas Bowl being the successor to the California Bowl.
