= Wayne Nunnely =

American football player and coach (1952–2021)

Biographical details
- Born: March 29, 1952; Los Angeles, California, U.S.
- Died: February 16, 2021 (aged 68)

Playing career
- 1972: UNLV
- Position: Fullback

Coaching career (HC unless noted)
- 1975: Valley HS (NV) (assistant)
- 1976: UNLV (GA)
- 1977–1978: Cal Poly Pomona (assistant)
- 1979: Cal State Fullerton (DL)
- 1980–1981: Pacific (CA) (RB)
- 1982–1985: UNLV (RB)
- 1986–1989: UNLV
- 1991–1992: USC (RB)
- 1993–1994: UCLA (DL)
- 1995–1996: New Orleans Saints (DL)
- 1997–2008: San Diego Chargers (DL)
- 2009–2011: Denver Broncos (DL)

Head coaching record
- Overall: 19–25

Wayne Benjamin Nunnely (March 29, 1952 – February 16, 2021) was an American football coach. He served as the head football coach at the University of Nevada, Las Vegas (UNLV) from 1986 to 1989. He was later an assistant coach in the National Football League (NFL) with the New Orleans Saints, San Diego Chargers and Denver Broncos. Nunnely died on February 16, 2021.

== Playing career ==
Nunnely played high school football at Monrovia High School in Monrovia, California. Nunnely played college football at the University of Nevada, Las Vegas (UNLV) where he was a fullback.

== Coaching career ==
On April 23, 1986, Nunnely was named interim head coach at UNLV after Harvey Hyde was dismissed due to disciplinary issues surrounding his players. Nunnely had been an assistant coach on Hyde's staff.

== Head coaching record ==
Year	Team	Overall	Conference	Standing	Bowl/playoffs
UNLV Rebels (Pacific Coast Athletic Association / Big West Conference) (1986–1989)
1986	UNLV	6–5	3–4	T–4th	
1987	UNLV	5–6	4–3	T–2nd	
1988	UNLV	4–7	3–4	T–5th	
1989	UNLV	4–7	3–4	5th	
UNLV:		19–25	13–15		
Total:		19–25			
