= Fremont Cannon =

U.S. sports trophy

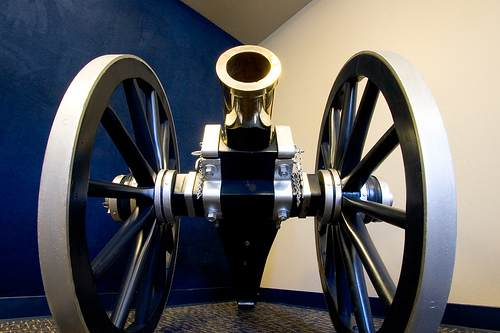
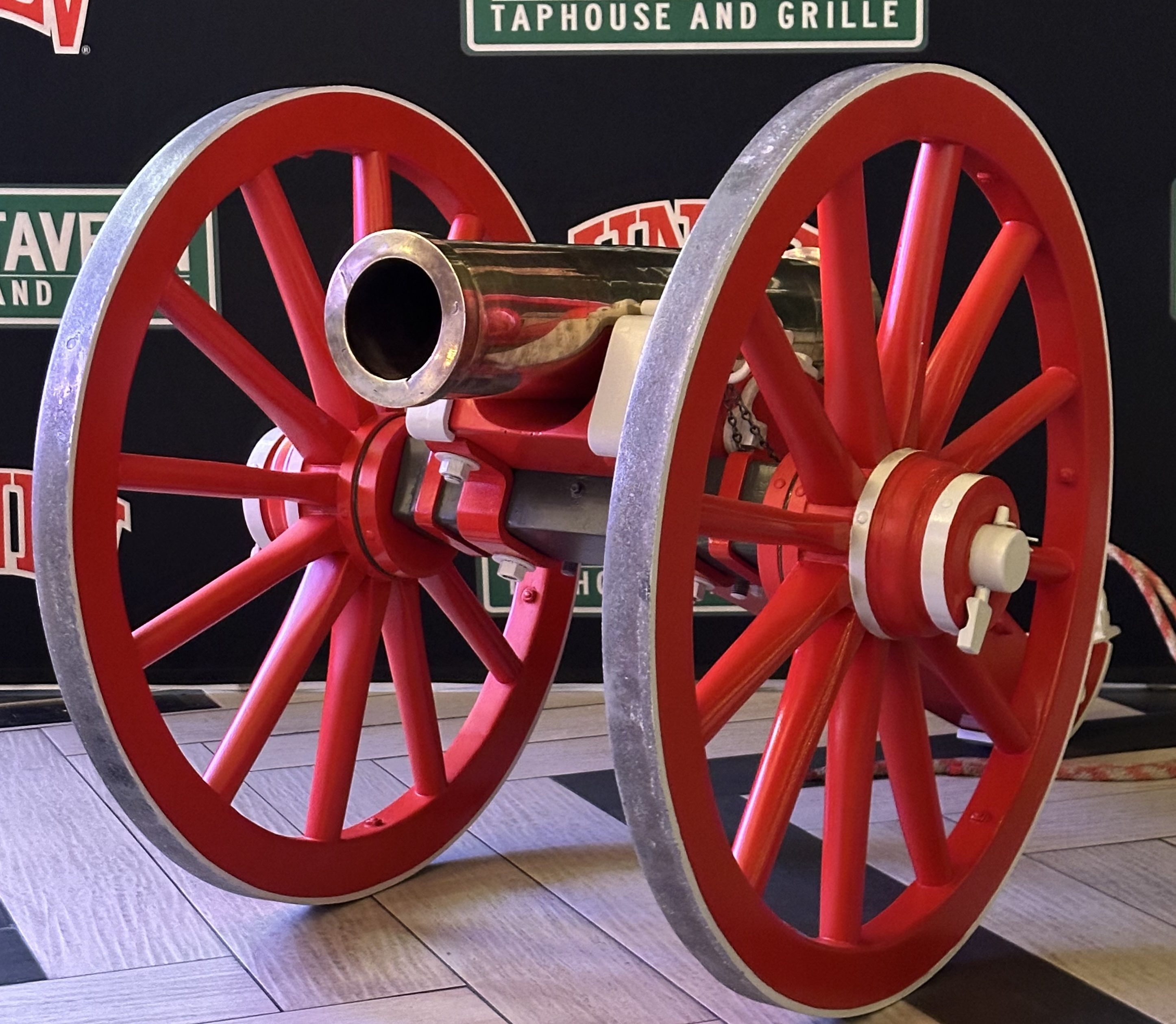
- Fremont Cannon in Nevada blue Fremont Cannon in UNLV scarlet

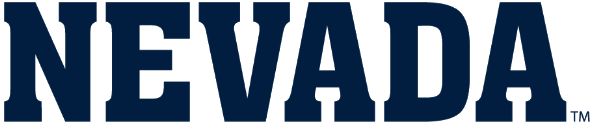
- Nevada Wolf Pack UNLV Rebels
- Sport: Football
- First meeting: November 22, 1969; Nevada 30, UNLV 28
- Latest meeting: November 29, 2025; UNLV 42, Nevada 17
- Next meeting: November 28, 2026 in Paradise
- Stadiums: Mackay Stadium; Reno, Nevada, U.S. (Nevada) Allegiant Stadium; Paradise, Nevada, U.S. (UNLV)
- Trophy: None (1969); Fremont Cannon (1970–present)

Statistics
- Total meetings: 51
- All-time series: Nevada leads, 29–22 (.569)
- Trophy series: Nevada leads, 28–22 (.560)
- Largest victory: Nevada, 50–8 (1991)
- Longest win streak: Nevada, 8 (2005–2012)
- Current win streak: UNLV, 4 (2022–present)

Locations of Nevada and UNLV stadiums

The Fremont Cannon is the trophy awarded to the winner of the Battle for Nevada (also known as the Nevada–UNLV football rivalry), an American college football rivalry game played annually by the Nevada Wolf Pack football team of the University of Nevada, Reno (Nevada) and the UNLV Rebels football team of the University of Nevada, Las Vegas (UNLV). The trophy was built in 1970 and is a replica of a 19th-century Howitzer cannon that accompanied American explorer and politician John C. Frémont on an expedition to the American West and Nevada in the mid 19th century. The original cannon had been abandoned, due to heavy snows, in the Sierra Nevada in 1843. The replica cannon was originally fired following a touchdown by the team in possession of the cannon, but it has been inoperable since 1999. The wooden carriage is painted the school color of the team in possession, navy blue for Nevada or scarlet for UNLV. The trophy is the heaviest and most expensive in college football. Since 2012, the game is also part of the Silver State Series (formerly Governor's Series), the series of athletic competitions between the two schools.

The first game between the teams was in 1969 with Nevada defeating UNLV. The following year, the cannon was built and UNLV became the first team to win the cannon. Nevada has the longest win streak in the rivalry, having held the cannon for eight consecutive years.

UNLV is the current holder of the trophy after defeating Nevada on November 29, 2025 at Mackay Stadium.

== History of the trophy ==
In 1967, Bill Ireland was hired by Nevada Southern University (the predecessor to UNLV) to coach their new football team and by 1969 came up with the idea to have a trophy as a symbol of the rivalry between the two schools. Ireland was the first football coach of the UNLV Rebels and an alumnus and former coach of Nevada. The cannon was donated by Kennecott Copper and is a replica of a howitzer cannon that explorer John C. Fremont used on an expedition in 1843 and left in a large snowdrift in the Sierra Nevada mountains. The cannon contains a 55 millimetres (2.2 in) barrel, weighs 545 pounds (247 kg), and cost $10,000 to build, making it the heaviest and most expensive trophy in college football. The cannon is painted the winning team's color, red for UNLV, and blue for Nevada.

The two schools first played each other on November 22, 1969, the Saturday before Thanksgiving Day. This game was homecoming for Nevada, who won the game 30–28. At the time, construction of the cannon had yet to be completed. The first competition for the cannon was in 1970 when the Rebels won 42–30 in Las Vegas. In 1978, following Nevada's first victory over UNLV in four seasons, Chris Ault convinced security at McCarran International Airport to allow the team to disassemble the cannon and take it as carry-on luggage back to Reno. The team had to figure out how to break down the cannon, a task that was usually done by the Reserve Officers' Training Corps, which UNLV did not have in 1978.

The Fremont Cannon was refurbished by the UNLV athletics department at a cost of $1,500 in 2000 following damage after a UNLV victory celebration wherein fans and players attempted to lift the cannon and dropped it. Traditionally, the team possessing the cannon would fire it each time they scored a touchdown during the rivalry game; however, the cannon has not been fired since the restoration due to the damage it received.

== History of the rivalry ==
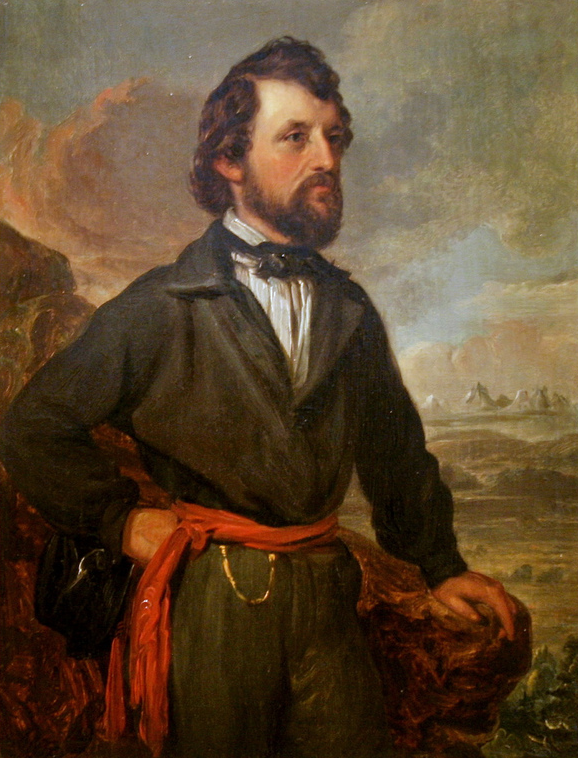
John C. Frémont, the cannon's namesake

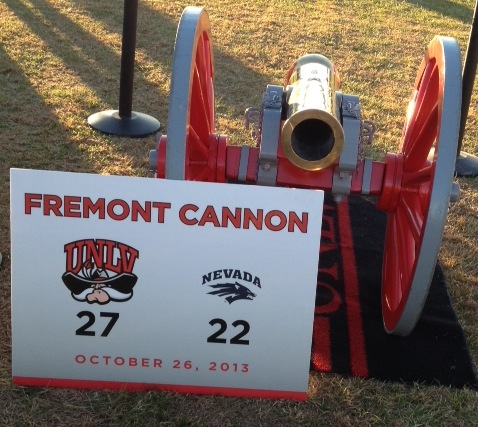
Fremont Cannon in 2013, painted with UNLV scarlet red

Students of Nevada's two public universities share a mutual disdain for each other, as evidenced by the numerous blue "FUNLV" (UNLV being shorthand for University of Nevada, Las Vegas) and red "FUNR" shirts (UNR being shorthand for University of Nevada, Reno) at the stadium on rivalry days.

In 1993, Wolf Pack coach Jeff Horton left Nevada after one season to coach for UNLV in what is referred to as the "Red Defection".

The rivalry is heated inside the stadium as well. Before many NCAA members relaxed alcohol sales policies at football games in the 2010s and 2020s, Sam Boyd Stadium and Mackay Stadium were two of the few NCAA football venues to sell alcohol to all spectators of legal age on game day. (Some institutions still do not sell alcohol at all, or sell it only to those seated in luxury boxes.) This, combined with the heated nature of the rivalry, has resulted in numerous fights in the stands. In 1995, UNLV players allegedly started a pre-game brawl, which prompted the Wolf Pack to run up the score in their 55–32 victory against UNLV. After the game, UNLV player Quincy Sanders threw his helmet in the direction of Nevada head coach Chris Ault.

On August 18, 2010, Nevada announced that they would join the Mountain West Conference starting in either 2011 or 2012; their entry was later confirmed for 2012. Since UNLV has been in the Mountain West Conference since 1999, the annual rivalry game is once again a conference game. When the MW expanded to 12 football members in 2013 and split into divisions for that sport, both schools were placed in the West Division, assuring annual matchups for the foreseeable future. The MW eliminated its football divisions after the 2022 season, but the Nevada–UNLV game was designated as an annual matchup in the new scheduling model. Before 2012, the last meeting of the two schools as conference rivals was in 1995, when both schools were members of the Big West Conference.

On October 8, 2012, Nevada Governor Brian Sandoval announced the launch of the Governor's Series for the annual Nevada vs. UNLV rivalry games for all athletic teams. In 2018, it was later renamed as the Silver State Series.

== Game results ==
Nevada victories	UNLV victories	Tie games	Forfeited wins (Note: UNLV's win in 1983 was forfeited as a result of NCAA sanctions against the UNLV football program issued on March 12, 1985, after an investigation found that ineligible players had participated in the 1983 and 1984 seasons. This win is not included in UNLV's all-time record. However, it is officially counted as a win for Nevada. See Wikipedia:WikiProject College football/Vacated victories for an explanation of how vacated victories are recorded.)

No.	Date	Location	Winner	Score
1	November 22, 1969	Reno, NV	Nevada	30–28
2	November 21, 1970	Sunrise Manor, NV	UNLV	42–30
3	November 20, 1971	Reno, NV	UNLV	27–13
4	November 18, 1972	East Las Vegas, NV	Nevada	41–13
5	November 17, 1973	Reno, NV	Nevada	19–3
6	November 16, 1974	East Las Vegas, NV	#2 UNLV	28–7
7	November 22, 1975	Reno, NV	UNLV	45–7
8	November 20, 1976	East Las Vegas, NV	#7 UNLV	49–33
9	November 19, 1977	Reno, NV	UNLV	27–12
10	September 16, 1978	East Las Vegas, NV	Nevada	23–14
11	September 15, 1979	Reno, NV	UNLV	26–21
12	September 3, 1983	East Las Vegas, NV	UNLV^{†}	28–18
13	November 16, 1985	Reno, NV	#3 Nevada	48–7
14	October 3, 1987	East Las Vegas, NV	UNLV	24–19
15	November 11, 1989	Reno, NV	Nevada	45–7
16	October 20, 1990	East Las Vegas, NV	#3 Nevada	26–14
17	September 7, 1991	Reno, NV	#5 Nevada	50–8
18	October 17, 1992	East Las Vegas, NV	Nevada	14–10
19	October 2, 1993	Reno, NV	Nevada	49–14
20	November 19, 1994	Whitney, NV	UNLV	32–27
21	October 28, 1995	Reno, NV	Nevada	55–32
22	October 5, 1996	Whitney, NV	Nevada	54–17
23	September 6, 1997	Reno, NV	Nevada	31–14
24	October 3, 1998	Whitney, NV	Nevada	31–20
25	October 2, 1999	Reno, NV	Nevada	26–12
26	October 7, 2000	Whitney, NV	UNLV	38–7
27	October 6, 2001	Reno, NV	UNLV	27–12

No.	Date	Location	Winner	Score
28	October 5, 2002	Whitney, NV	UNLV	21–17
29	October 4, 2003	Reno, NV	UNLV	16–12
30	October 2, 2004	Whitney, NV	UNLV	48–13
31	September 17, 2005	Reno, NV	Nevada	22–14
32	September 30, 2006	Whitney, NV	Nevada	31–3
33	September 29, 2007	Reno, NV	Nevada	27–20
34	September 27, 2008	Whitney, NV	Nevada	49–7
35	October 3, 2009	Reno, NV	Nevada	63–28
36	October 2, 2010	Whitney, NV	#25 Nevada	44–26
37	October 8, 2011	Reno, NV	Nevada	37–0
38	October 13, 2012	Whitney, NV	Nevada	42–37
39	October 26, 2013	Reno, NV	UNLV	27–22
40	November 29, 2014	Whitney, NV	Nevada	49–27
41	October 3, 2015	Reno, NV	UNLV	23–17
42	November 26, 2016	Whitney, NV	Nevada	45–10
43	November 25, 2017	Reno, NV	Nevada	23–16
44	November 24, 2018	Whitney, NV	UNLV	34–29
45	November 30, 2019	Reno, NV	UNLV	33–30^{OT}
46	October 31, 2020	Paradise, NV	Nevada	37–19
47	October 29, 2021	Reno, NV	Nevada	51–20
48	November 26, 2022	Paradise, NV	UNLV	27–22
49	October 14, 2023	Reno, NV	UNLV	45–27
50	November 30, 2024	Paradise, NV	#22 UNLV	38–14
51	November 29, 2025	Reno, NV	UNLV	42–17
52	November 28, 2026	Paradise, NV		
Series: Nevada leads 29–22
† Forfeited by UNLV.

- Forfeited wins (1: 1983)
- Non-conference games (33: 1969–1991 and 1996–2011)
- One overtime game: 2019 (OT)
- Not played in 6 seasons (1980–1982, 1984, 1986 and 1988)

== Coaching records ==
Since first game on November 22, 1969

=== Nevada ===
Head Coach	Games	Seasons	Wins	Losses	Ties	Pct.
Jerry Scattini	7	1969–1975	3	4	0	.429
Chris Ault (a)	11	1976–1992	7	4	0	.636
Jeff Horton	1	1993	1	0	0	1.000
Chris Ault (b)	2	1994–1995	1	1	0	.500
Jeff Tisdel	4	1996–1999	4	0		1.000
Chris Tormey	4	2000–2003	0	4		.000
Chris Ault (c)	9	2004–2012	8	1		.889
Brian Polian	4	2013–2016	2	2		.500
Jay Norvell	5	2017–2021	3	2		.600
Ken Wilson	2	2022–2023	0	2		.000
Jeff Choate	2	2024–present	0	2		.000

- Chris Ault's overall record in series is 16–6–0 (.727)

=== UNLV ===
Head Coach	Games	Seasons	Wins	Losses	Ties	Pct.
Bill Ireland	4	1968–1972	2	2	0	.500
Ron Meyer	3	1973–1975	2	1	0	.667
Tony Knap	4	1976–1981	3	1	0	.750
Harvey Hyde	2	1982–1985	0	2	0	.000
Wayne Nunnely	2	1986–1989	1	1	0	.500
Jim Strong	4	1990–1993	0	4	0	.000
Jeff Horton	5	1994–1998	1	4	0	1.000
John Robinson	6	1999–2004	5	1		.833
Mike Sanford	5	2005–2009	0	5		.000
Bobby Hauck	5	2010–2014	1	4		.200
Tony Sanchez	5	2015–2019	3	2		.600
Marcus Arroyo	3	2020–2022	1	2		.333
Barry Odom	2	2023–2024	2	0		1.000
Dan Mullen	1	2025–present	1	0		1.000

== See also ==
- List of NCAA college football rivalry games
