= 1983 NCAA Division I-AA Football Championship Game =

College football game

1983 NCAA Division I-AA Football Championship
- I-AA National Championship Game
Western Carolina Catamounts	Southern Illinois Salukis
(11–2–1)	(12–1)
Southern	Missouri Valley
7	43
Head coach: Bob Waters	Head coach: Rey Dempsey
NCAA / Seed; 9 / –	NCAA / Seed; 1 / 1
	1	2	3	4	Total
Western Carolina	0	0	0	7	7
Southern Illinois	0	10	23	10	43
- Date: December 17, 1983
- Season: 1983
- Stadium: Johnson Hagood Stadium
- Location: Charleston, South Carolina
- Attendance: 15,950

United States TV coverage
- Network: ABC Sports
- Announcers: Keith Jackson and Frank Broyles

The 1983 NCAA Division I-AA Football Championship Game was a postseason college football game between the Southern Illinois Salukis and the Western Carolina Catamounts. The game was played on December 17, 1983, at Johnson Hagood Stadium in Charleston, South Carolina. The culminating game of the 1983 NCAA Division I-AA football season, it was won by Southern Illinois, 43–7.

== Teams ==
The participants of the Championship Game were the finalists of the 1983 I-AA Playoffs, which began with a 12-team bracket.

=== Southern Illinois Salukis ===
Southern Illinois finished their regular season with a 10–1 record (5–1 in conference); their only loss was to Wichita State in their final regular season game. Ranked first in the final NCAA I-AA in-house poll and seeded first in the tournament, the Salukis received a first-round bye then defeated Indiana State and Nevada to reach the final. This was the first appearance for Southern Illinois in a Division I-AA championship game.

=== Western Carolina Catamounts ===
Western Carolina finished their regular season with an 8–2–1 record (5–0–1 in conference); their two losses were to Division I-A programs, Clemson and Wake Forest; the tie came against conference rival Furman. Ranked ninth in the final NCAA I-AA in-house poll and unseeded in the tournament, the Catamounts defeated Colgate, second-seed Holy Cross, and third-seed Furman to reach the final. This was also the first appearance for Western Carolina in a Division I-AA championship game.

== Game summary ==
After a scoreless first quarter, Southern Illinois took a 10–0 lead into halftime, then broke the game open with 23 unanswered points in the third quarter. The Salukis' defense intercepted seven passes, with four of the interceptions made by safety Greg Shipp.

=== Scoring summary ===
Scoring summary

Quarter	Time	Drive			Team	Scoring information	Score	
Quarter	Time	Plays	Yards	TOP	Team	Scoring information	WCU	SIU
2	11:45		20		SIU	Derrick Taylor 10-yard touchdown reception from Rick Johnson, Ron Miller kick good	0	7
2	2:15		44		SIU	36-yard field goal by Miller	0	10
3	9:21	9	37		SIU	Johnson 1-yard touchdown run, Miller kick good	0	17
3	4:33	1	26		SIU	James Stevenson 26-yard touchdown reception from Johnson, Miller kick good	0	24
3	2:05				SIU	Melvin Dorsey tackled in end zone for a safety by Ken Foster	0	26
3	0:56	3	13		SIU	Terry Green 1-yard touchdown run, Miller kick good	0	33
4	7:48				SIU	23-yard field goal by Miller	0	36
4	5:35		85		WCU	Kristy Kiser 7-yard touchdown reception from Jeff Gilbert, Dean Biasucci kick good	7	36
4	0:56		30		SIU	Green 10-yard touchdown run, Miller kick good	7	43
"TOP" = time of possession. For other American football terms, see Glossary of American football.							7	43

=== Game statistics ===
	1	2	3	4	Total
Catamounts	0	0	0	7	7
Salukis	0	10	23	10	43

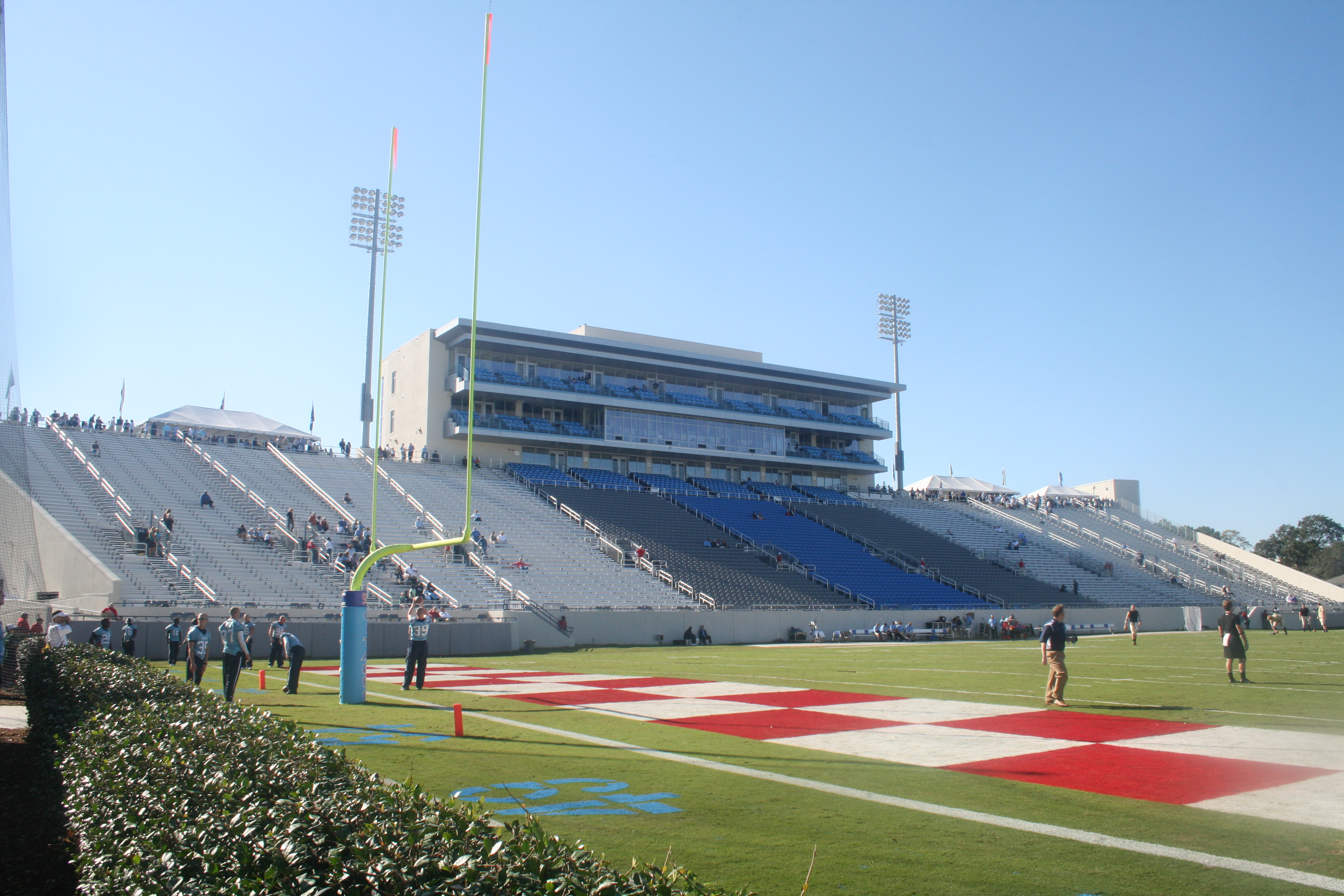
Johnson Hagood Stadium, site of the 1983 Division I-AA championship game

Statistics	WCU	SIU
First downs	15	19
Plays–yards	61–238	75–367
Rushes–yards	27–84	50–154
Passing yards	154	213
Passing: comp–att–int	16–34–7	19–25–0
Time of possession	20:22	39:38

Team	Category	Player	Statistics
Western Carolina	Passing	Jeff Gilbert	16–33, 154 yds, 1 TD, 7 INT
Western Carolina	Rushing	Leonard Williams	7 car, 48 yds
Western Carolina	Receiving	Melvin Dorsey	4 rec, 49 yds
Southern Illinois	Passing	Rick Johnson	19–25, 213 yds, 2 TD
Southern Illinois	Rushing	Derrick Taylor	18 car, 40 yds
Southern Illinois	Receiving	James Stevenson	5 rec, 88 yds, 1 TD
