= Dunedin High School =

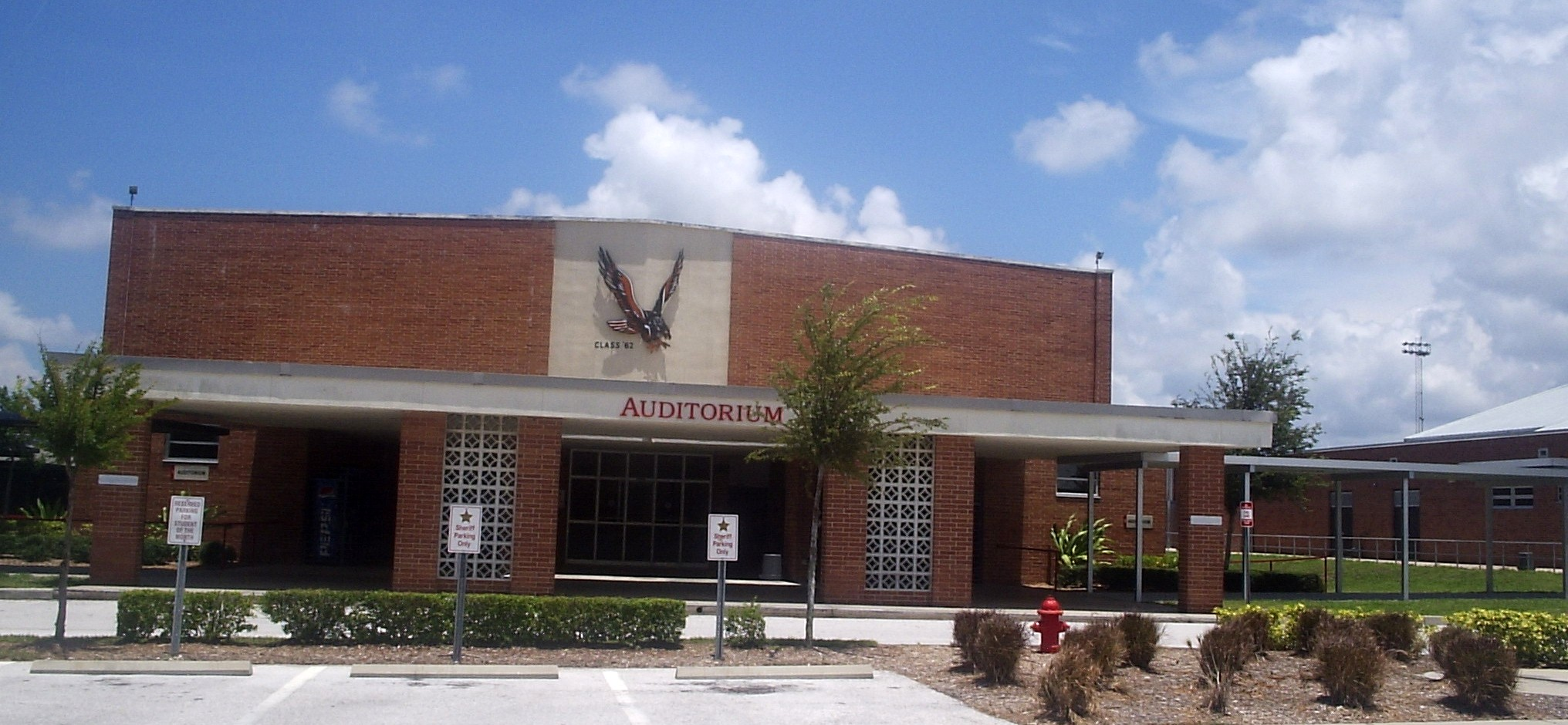
- The Dunedin High School Auditorium, one of the original buildings from 1961.

Location
- 1651 Pinehurst Road; Dunedin, Florida; United States; 28.0280736°N 82.768435°W

Information
- Type: Comprehensive Public High School
- Opened: 1961
- School district: Pinellas County Schools
- CEEB code: 100428
- Principal: James Kiblinger
- Teaching staff: 55.00 (FTE)
- Grades: 9–12
- Enrollment: 1,190 (2023-2024)
- Student to teacher ratio: 21.64
- Campus type: Suburban
- Colors: Red and white
- Mascot: Freddie the Falcon
- Nickname: Falcons
- Newspaper: the Beakon
- Website: www.pcsb.org/dunedin-hs

Dunedin High School is a high school in Dunedin, Florida, United States. It is operated by the Pinellas County School Board. The school mascot is Freddie the Falcon. The official school colors are red and white, though red and black have become the unofficial, and more popular, school colors.

== Community involvement and partnerships ==
- Parent-Teacher-Student Association (PTSA)
- School Advisory Council (SAC)
- Partnerships: Bright House Networks, Nielsen Media Research, Raytheon Company, City of Dunedin, Dunedin Chamber of Commerce
- Volunteer program

== NJROTC ==
The Naval Junior Reserve Officer's Training Corps program provides an opportunity for cadets to learn valuable leadership skills, citizenship skills, and the value of commitment, honor and courage (the Navy's core values). Dunedin High School's NJROTC unit was founded in 1974. It has been awarded the Distinguished Unit award four consecutive years (2007 to 2010). This award is the highest honor any NJROTC unit can earn. DHS's NJROTC unit has also won the state Orienteering championships for Florida, 3 consecutive years (2007 to 2009).

== Scottish Highlander Band ==
The Scottish Highlander Band is one of the biggest organizations on campus and most prominent. There are several different ensembles within the program including: Marching band, concert band, jazz band, percussion ensemble, orchestra, and pipe band. All of the ensembles mentioned have won many awards. In the 2012–2013 school year, a color guard was added to the band.

== Notable alumni ==
- Amy Benz, former professional golfer
- Bill Cappleman, former professional NFL player for the Minnesota Vikings and Detroit Lions
- Michael "Pinball" Clemons, former professional football player for the Kansas City Chiefs and coach in the NFL and CFL
- Ron DeSantis, former member of the U.S House of Representatives and Governor of Florida
- Brian Dopirak, former professional baseball player for the Chicago Cubs, Toronto Blue Jays, and Houston Astros
- Matt Dunbar, former professional baseball player for the Miami Marlins
- Juan Garcia-Herreros, virtuoso jazz musician and composer
- Scott Hemond, former professional baseball player for the Oakland Athletics, Chicago White Sox, and St. Louis Cardinals
- John Huston, professional golfer
- Crawford Ker, former professional football player for the Dallas Cowboys and Denver Broncos
- Kidd Kraddick, radio host of Kidd Kraddick in the Morning from 1992 to 2013
- David Nutter, television and film director
- Adam Quinn, Bagpipe virtuoso and member of Celtic band Lucid Druid
- Stacey Simmons, former professional football player for the Indianapolis Colts
- Lari White, musician and actress
