= Bill Cappleman =

American football player (born 1947)

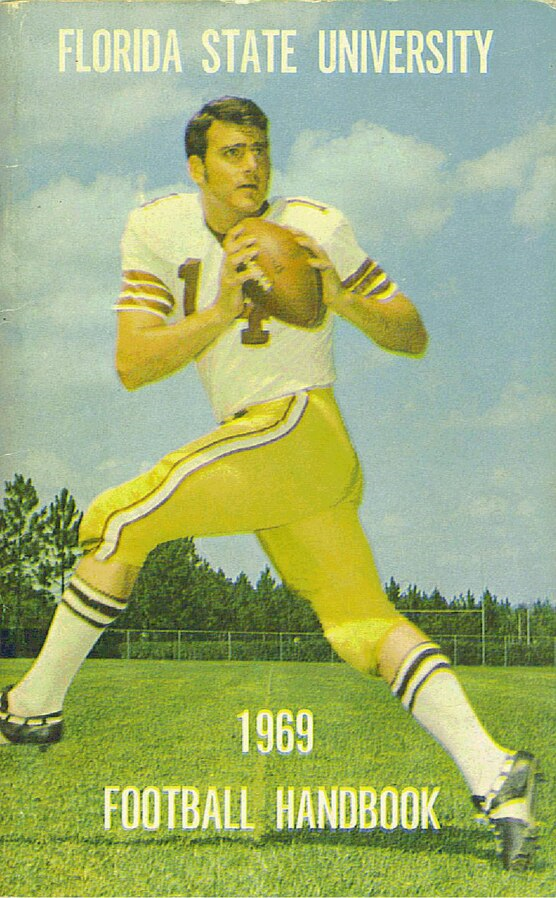
- Cappleman on the cover of Florida State's 1969 media guide

No. 17
- Position: Quarterback

Personal information
- Born: March 12, 1947 (age 79); Brooksville, Florida, U.S.
- Listed height: 6 ft 3 in (1.91 m)
- Listed weight: 210 lb (95 kg)

Career information
- High school: Dunedin (Dunedin, Florida)
- College: Florida State
- NFL draft: 1970: 2nd round, 51st overall pick

Career history
- Minnesota Vikings (1970); Detroit Lions (1973)

Career NFL statistics
- Passing attempts: 18
- Passing completions: 9
- Completion percentage: 50.0%
- TD–INT: 0–1
- Passing yards: 82
- Passer rating: 39.6
- Stats at Pro Football Reference

George William Cappleman (born March 12, 1947) is an American former professional football player who was a quarterback in the National Football League (NFL). He played from 1967 to 1969 for the Florida State Seminoles, serving as the starting quarterback in his final two seasons. In both of his starting seasons, he was named to the All-South Independent football team. Following his college career, he was selected in the second round of the 1970 NFL draft by the Minnesota Vikings, serving as a backup quarterback in the 1970 season. After playing in one game for the team, he was traded to the Philadelphia Eagles, for whom he did not play, and eventually to the Detroit Lions, where he played several games in the 1973 season. He was traded by the Lions in 1974, played in the World Football League, and was signed on as a quarterback to the Tampa Bay Buccaneers in 1976.

== Early life ==
Cappleman was born on March 12, 1947, in Brooksville, Florida. He is a native of Dunedin, Florida, and attended Dunedin High School. While there, he played the quarterback position for the high school football team. As a high school athlete, he visited Florida State University in Tallahassee, Florida, and was impressed by the pass-heavy, pro-style offense that head coach Bill Peterson had implemented with quarterback Steve Tensi and wide receiver Fred Biletnikoff. As a result, he committed to playing college football there with the Seminoles team.

== College career ==
Cappleman attended Florida State University from 1966 to 1969, playing at the quarterback position for the Seminoles football team in his last three years. (Note: Freshman were barred from playing college football by the National Collegiate Athletic Association until the 1972 NCAA University Division football season.) In the 1967 season, he was the third-string quarterback, behind starter Kim Hammond and backup Gary Pajcic. Prior to the 1968 season, Cappleman was named the team's starting quarterback, beating out Pajcic for the spot. During his last two seasons, "Cap", as he was nicknamed, started 19 games. He often worked with wide receiver Ron Sellers, who set the college football record for receiving yards during his time at Florida State.

In 1968, Cappleman broke the Florida State records for both passing yards and passing touchdowns, recording 2,410 yards and 25 touchdowns. The previous records had been 1,991 yards and 15 touchdowns. The Seminoles finished their regular season with 8 wins and 2 losses, as well as a berth in the 1968 Peach Bowl. Cappleman served as the quarterback for the bowl game, which the Seminoles lost by a score of 31–27 to the LSU Tigers. The following season, Cappleman threw 2,467 yards and recorded 14 passing touchdowns. Cappleman finished his college career at Florida State with 4,904 passing yards and 39 touchdowns, setting Florida State records for both. Additionally, he set a school record for single game passing yards in a game against the 1969 Memphis State Tigers football team, throwing for 508 yards. In 1970, Cappleman participated in the Senior Bowl and the North–South Shrine Game all-star games.

=== College statistics ===
| Season | Team | Passing | | | | | | | Rushing | | | |
| Season | Team | Cmp | Att | Yds | Pct | TD | Int | Rtg | Att | Yds | Avg | TD |
|---|---|---|---|---|---|---|---|---|---|---|---|---|
| 1967 | Florida State | 4 | 5 | 27 | 80.0 | 0 | 0 | 125.4 | 6 | -5 | -0.8 | 0 |
| 1968 | Florida State | 162 | 287 | 2,410 | 56.4 | 25 | 11 | 148.1 | 62 | -68 | -1.1 | 1 |
| 1969 | Florida State | 183 | 344 | 2,467 | 53.2 | 14 | 18 | 116.4 | 73 | −332 | −4.5 | 0 |
| Career | | 349 | 636 | 4,904 | 54.9 | 39 | 29 | 130.8 | 141 | -405 | -2.9 | 1 |

== Professional career ==
Following his college career, Cappleman was selected in the second round of the 1970 NFL draft by the Minnesota Vikings as the 51st overall pick. The Vikings traded Cappleman to the Philadelphia Eagles in exchange for a fourth-round selection in the 1973 NFL draft, which they used to select quarterback Mike Wells of the Illinois Fighting Illini football team. However, on September 29, 1971, the Detroit Lions acquired Cappleman from the Eagles as part of a deal that granted the Eagles a third-round pick in the 1972 NFL draft. The Eagles subsequently used this pick to draft Tom Luken. Cappleman saw play time for the Lions during the 1973 season, attempting 11 passes. On August 17, 1974, Cappleman was traded by the Lions in exchange for quarterback Sam Wyche. During all of his playing seasons with the Vikings and Lions, he was a backup quarterback, with sportswriter Skip Rozin describing his career as "frustrating".

Following the Lions, he played in the nascent World Football League. Prior to the 1976 season, Cappleman, who by this time was described by Rozin as a "journeyman" quarterback, was signed by the newly formed Tampa Bay Buccaneers as one of three quarterbacks for the team, alongside Steve Spurrier and Jim Foote, with Spurrier getting the starting position.

== NFL career statistics ==
| Year | Team | Games | | | Passing | | | | | | | | | | Rushing | | | | | Sacked | | Fumbles | |
| Year | Team | GP | GS | Record | Cmp | Att | Pct | Yds | Y/A | Y/G | Lng | TD | Int | Rtg | Att | Yds | Y/A | Lng | TD | Sck | SckY | Fum | Lost |
|---|---|---|---|---|---|---|---|---|---|---|---|---|---|---|---|---|---|---|---|---|---|---|---|
| 1970 | MIN | 1 | 0 | — | 4 | 7 | 57.1 | 49 | 7.0 | 49 | 26 | 0 | 0 | 78.9 | 0 | 0 | 0 | 0 | 0 | 0 | 0 | 0 | 0 |
| 1973 | DET | 7 | 0 | — | 5 | 11 | 45.5 | 33 | 3.0 | 4.7 | 8 | 0 | 1 | 14.6 | 1 | -2 | -2.0 | -2 | 0 | 0 | 0 | 0 | 0 |
| Career | | 8 | 0 | — | 9 | 18 | 50.0 | 82 | 4.6 | 10.3 | 26 | 0 | 1 | 39.6 | 1 | -2 | -2.0 | -2 | 0 | 0 | 0 | 0 | 0 |

== Awards and honors ==
For the 1968 season, the Associated Press gave Cappleman an honorable mention for their 1968 College Football All-America Team. Additionally, he was named to both the 1968 and 1969 All-South Independent football team. In recognition of his performance during the Seminoles' 1968 game against the Houston Cougars, Sports Illustrated named Cappleman the "national back of the week". Several of his wins are memorialized at the Florida State Football Sod Cemetery, including the 1968 wins against the Houston Cougars and the NC State Wolfpack and a 1969 win against the Miami Hurricanes. In 1984, he was inducted into Florida State University's hall of fame in 1984. In 2014, he participated in a "Sod Talk" at Sod Cemetery prior to that year's game against the Wake Forest Demon Deacons where he reflected on his collegiate career. In a 2020 article, the Tallahassee Democrat listed Cappleman as the third best Florida State player of the 1960s.

== Personal life ==
Following his career with the Vikings and the Lions, Cappleman became involved in the magazine industry in South Florida. As of 2018, he resides in Panama City, Florida. He has a daughter who is an attorney.

== See also ==
- Florida State Seminoles football statistical leaders
