= 1983 Georgia Tech Yellow Jackets football team =

American college football season

1983 Georgia Tech Yellow Jackets football
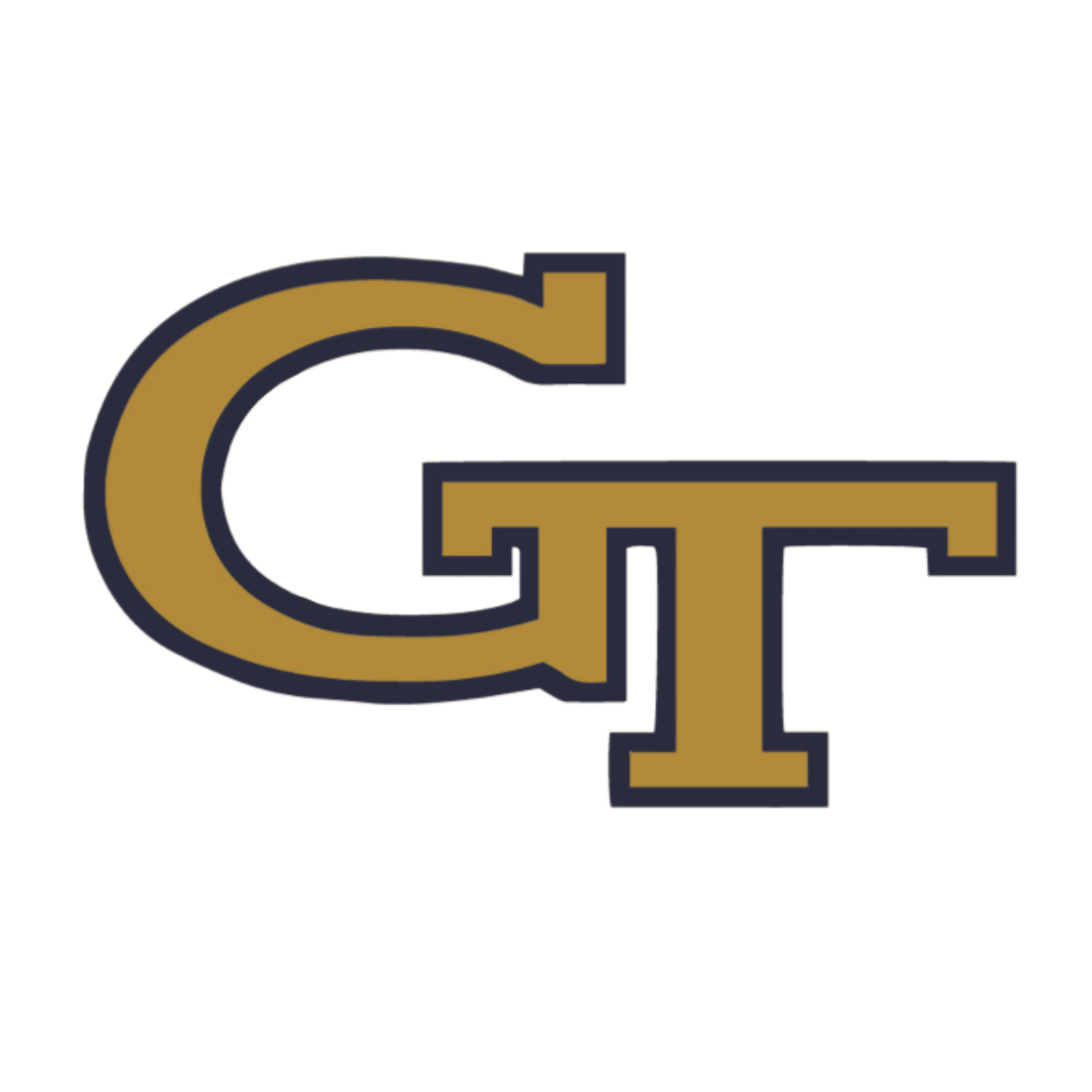
- Conference: Atlantic Coast Conference
- Record: 3–8 (3–2 ACC)
- Head coach: Bill Curry (4th season)
- Offensive coordinator: Dwain Painter (2nd season)
- Defensive coordinator: Rick Lantz (2nd season)
- Captains: Rob Horton; Dean Waters; Ron Rice
- Home stadium: Grant Field

1983 Atlantic Coast Conference football standings
	Conf.					Overall
Team	W		L		T	W		L		T
Maryland $	5	–	0	–	0	8	–	4	–	0
North Carolina	4	–	2	–	0	8	–	4	–	0
Georgia Tech	3	–	2	–	0	3	–	8	–	0
Virginia	3	–	3	–	0	6	–	5	–	0
Duke	3	–	3	–	0	3	–	8	–	0
Wake Forest	1	–	5	–	0	4	–	7	–	0
NC State	1	–	5	–	0	3	–	8	–	0
No. 11 Clemson *	0	–	0	–	0	9	–	1	–	1
$ – Conference champion; * – Clemson was under NCAA and ACC probation and was ineligible for the ACC title. As a result, their ACC games did not count in the league standings.; Rankings from AP Poll

The 1983 Georgia Tech Yellow Jackets football team represented the Georgia Institute of Technology during the 1983 NCAA Division I-A football season. The Yellow Jackets were led by fourth-year head coach Bill Curry, and played their home games at Grant Field in Atlanta. In their first year as full members of the Atlantic Coast Conference, the team finished in third with a final record of 3–8 (3–2 ACC).

== Schedule ==
Date	Opponent	Site	TV	Result	Attendance	Source
September 10	at No. 14 Alabama*	Legion Field; Birmingham, AL (rivalry)		L 7–20	77,143	
September 17	Furman*	Grant Field; Atlanta, GA		L 14–17	24,311	
September 24	at Clemson*^{A}	Memorial Stadium; Clemson, SC (rivalry)	ESPN	L 14–41	73,000	
October 1	No. 5 North Carolina	Grant Field; Atlanta, GA		L 21–38	28,395	
October 8	at NC State	Carter–Finley Stadium; Raleigh, NC		W 20–10	40,800	
October 15	No. 5 Auburn*	Grant Field; Atlanta, GA (rivalry)		L 13–31	55,112	
October 22	at Tennessee*	Neyland Stadium; Knoxville, TN (rivalry)		L 3–37	94,768	
October 29	at Duke	Wallace Wade Stadium; Durham, NC		L 26–32	17,650	
November 3	Virginia	Grant Field; Atlanta, GA	TBS	W 31–27	22,032	
November 12	Wake Forest^{†}	Grant Field; Atlanta, GA		W 49–33	26,330	
November 26	No. 7 Georgia*	Grant Field; Atlanta, GA (Clean, Old-Fashioned Hate)		L 24–27	59,113	
*Non-conference game; ^{†}Homecoming; Rankings from AP Poll released prior to the game

A.Clemson was under NCAA probation, and was ineligible for the ACC title. Therefore this game did not count in the league standings.

== Roster ==
1983 Georgia Tech Yellow Jackets football team roster
Players
Coaches
Offense

Pos.	#	Name	Class
RB		Robert Lavette
WR		David Dean	So
TE	9	Ken Whisenhunt
OL		Derek Gwinn
OL		Dean Waters

Defense

Pos.	#	Name	Class
DL		Bobby Hodge
DL		Donnie Chisholm
LB		Rob Horton
LB		Dante Jones
LB		Pat Swilling
LB		Ted Roof
CB	22	Jack Westbrook
DB		Mike Travis

Special teams

Pos.	#	Name	Class

Head coach

- Bill Curry

Coordinators/assistant coaches

- Dwain Painter – Offensive coordinator
- Rip Scherer – Running backs
- Keith Colson – Wide receivers
- Tim Harkness – Wide receivers/Tight ends
- Dan Dorazio – Offensive line
- Mac McWhorter – Offensive line
- Rick Lantz – Defensive coordinator
- Larry New – Defensive line
- John Guy – Outside linebackers
- Rick Smith – Defensive backs

Legend

- (C) Team captain
- (S) Suspended
- (I) Ineligible
- Injured
- Redshirt
