= 1983 Chattanooga Moccasins football team =

American college football season

1983 Chattanooga Moccasins football
- Conference: Southern Conference
- Record: 7–4 (5–2 SoCon)
- Head coach: Bill Oliver (4th season)
- Captain: Game captains
- Home stadium: Chamberlain Field

1983 Southern Conference football standings
	Conf.					Overall
Team	W		L		T	W		L		T
No. 2 Furman $^	6	–	0	–	1	10	–	2	–	1
No. 9 Western Carolina ^	5	–	0	–	1	11	–	3	–	1
Chattanooga	5	–	2	–	0	7	–	4	–	0
Appalachian State	4	–	3	–	0	6	–	5	–	0
Marshall	3	–	4	–	0	4	–	7	–	0
VMI	1	–	5	–	0	2	–	9	–	0
The Citadel	1	–	6	–	0	3	–	8	–	0
East Tennessee State	1	–	6	–	0	3	–	8	–	0
Davidson	0	–	2	–	0	2	–	8	–	0
$ – Conference champion; ^ – NCAA Division I-AA playoff participant; Rankings from NCAA Division I-AA Football Committee poll

The 1983 Chattanooga Moccasins football team represented the University of Tennessee at Chattanooga as a member of the Southern Conference (SoCon) in the 1983 NCAA Division I-AA football season. The Moccasins were led by fourth-year head coach Bill Oliver and played their home games at Chamberlain Field. They finished the season 7–4 overall and 5–2 in SoCon play to place third.

== Schedule ==
Date	Opponent	Rank	Site	Result	Attendance	Source
September 3	Jacksonville State*		Chamberlain Field; Chattanooga, TN	W 13–6	10,254	
September 10	Arkansas State*		Chamberlain Field; Chattanooga, TN	L 14–27	9,721	
September 17	at Southwestern Louisiana*		Cajun Field; Lafayette, LA	W 38–14	20,157	
October 1	at Louisiana Tech*		Joe Aillet Stadium; Ruston, LA	L 14–17	16,600	
October 8	at No. 10 Appalachian State		Conrad Stadium; Boone, NC	W 30–9	13,264	
October 15	The Citadel^{†}		Chamberlain Field; Chattanooga, TN	W 30–9	10,203	
October 22	Marshall		Chamberlain Field; Chattanooga, TN	W 23–16	7,122	
October 29	at Western Carolina	No. 17	Whitmire Stadium; Cullowhee, NC	L 15–25	9,245	
November 5	VMI		Chamberlain Field; Chattanooga, TN	W 23–6	7,488	
November 12	at No. 4 Furman		Paladin Stadium; Greenville, SC	L 14–28	10,021	
November 19	at East Tennessee State		Memorial Center; Johnson City, TN	W 13–10	4,113	
*Non-conference game; ^{†}Homecoming; Rankings from NCAA Division I-AA Football Committee Poll released prior to the game
