= 1983 Western Carolina Catamounts football team =

American college football season

1983 Western Carolina Catamounts football

NCAA Division I-AA Championship Game, L 7–43 vs Southern Illinois
- Conference: Southern Conference
- Record: 11–3–1 (5–0–1 SoCon)
- Head coach: Bob Waters (15th season)
- Defensive coordinator: Mike Hennigan (2nd season)
- Home stadium: E. J. Whitmire Stadium

1983 Southern Conference football standings
	Conf.					Overall
Team	W		L		T	W		L		T
No. 2 Furman $^	6	–	0	–	1	10	–	2	–	1
No. 9 Western Carolina ^	5	–	0	–	1	11	–	3	–	1
Chattanooga	5	–	2	–	0	7	–	4	–	0
Appalachian State	4	–	3	–	0	6	–	5	–	0
Marshall	3	–	4	–	0	4	–	7	–	0
VMI	1	–	5	–	0	2	–	9	–	0
The Citadel	1	–	6	–	0	3	–	8	–	0
East Tennessee State	1	–	6	–	0	3	–	8	–	0
Davidson	0	–	2	–	0	2	–	8	–	0
$ – Conference champion; ^ – NCAA Division I-AA playoff participant; Rankings from NCAA Division I-AA Football Committee poll

The 1983 Western Carolina Catamounts team was an American football team that represented Western Carolina University as a member of the Southern Conference (SoCon) during the 1983 NCAA Division I-AA football season. In their 15th year under head coach Bob Waters, the team compiled an overall record of 11–3–1, with a mark of 5–0–1 in conference play, and finished second in the SoCon. Western Carolina advanced to the NCAA Division I-AA Championship Game and were defeated by Southern Illinois.

== Schedule ==
Date	Opponent	Rank	Site	Result	Attendance	Source
September 3	at Clemson*		Memorial Stadium; Clemson, SC	L 10–44	69,962	
September 17	at Wake Forest*		Groves Stadium; Winston-Salem, NC	L 0–21	21,351	
September 24	East Tennessee State		E. J. Whitmire Stadium; Cullowhee, NC	W 17–16		
October 1	at Marshall		Fairfield Stadium; Huntington, WV	W 21–7	10,200	
October 8	at Tennessee Tech*		Tucker Stadium; Cookeville, TN	W 42–10	11,308	
October 15	No. 5 Furman		E. J. Whitmire Stadium; Cullowhee, NC	T 17–17	11,642	
October 22	Wofford*		E. J. Whitmire Stadium; Cullowhee, NC	W 37–20	10,755	
October 29	No. 17 Chattanooga		E. J. Whitmire Stadium; Cullowhee, NC	W 25–15	9,245	
November 5	at The Citadel	No. T–20	Johnson Hagood Stadium; Charleston, SC	W 44–17	13,240	
November 12	Gardner–Webb*	No. 18	E. J. Whitmire Stadium; Cullowhee, NC	W 43–7	6,212	
November 19	Appalachian State	No. 13	E. J. Whitmire Stadium; Cullowhee, NC (rivalry)	W 41–15	13,924	
November 26	No. 7 Colgate*	No. 9	E. J. Whitmire Stadium; Cullowhee, NC (Division I-AA First Round)	W 24–23	6,500	
December 3	at No. 3 Holy Cross*	No. 9	Fitton Field; Worcester, MA (Division I-AA Quarterfinal)	W 28–21	10,814	
December 10	at No. 2 Furman	No. 9	Paladin Stadium; Greenville, SC (NCAA Division I-AA Semifinal)	W 14–7	13,034	
December 17	vs. No. 1 Southern Illinois*	No. 9	Johnson Hagood Stadium; Charleston, SC (NCAA Division I-AA Championship Game)	L 7–43	15,950	
*Non-conference game; Rankings from NCAA Division I-AA Football Committee Poll released prior to the game
