= 1983 Appalachian State Mountaineers football team =

American college football season

1983 Appalachian State Mountaineers football
- Conference: Southern Conference
- Record: 6–5 (4–3 SoCon)
- Head coach: Mack Brown (1st season)
- Home stadium: Conrad Stadium

1983 Southern Conference football standings
	Conf.					Overall
Team	W		L		T	W		L		T
No. 2 Furman $^	6	–	0	–	1	10	–	2	–	1
No. 9 Western Carolina ^	5	–	0	–	1	11	–	3	–	1
Chattanooga	5	–	2	–	0	7	–	4	–	0
Appalachian State	4	–	3	–	0	6	–	5	–	0
Marshall	3	–	4	–	0	4	–	7	–	0
VMI	1	–	5	–	0	2	–	9	–	0
The Citadel	1	–	6	–	0	3	–	8	–	0
East Tennessee State	1	–	6	–	0	3	–	8	–	0
Davidson	0	–	2	–	0	2	–	8	–	0
$ – Conference champion; ^ – NCAA Division I-AA playoff participant; Rankings from NCAA Division I-AA Football Committee poll

The 1983 Appalachian State Mountaineers football team was an American football team that represented Appalachian State University as a member of the Southern Conference (SoCon) during the 1983 NCAA Division I-AA football season. In their only year under head coach Mack Brown, the Mountaineers compiled an overall record of 6–5 with a mark of 4–5 in conference play, placing fourth in the SoCon.

== Schedule ==
Date	Opponent	Rank	Site	Result	Attendance	Source
September 3	at Wake Forest*		Groves Stadium; Winston-Salem, NC	W 27–25	25,711	
September 10	James Madison*		Conrad Stadium; Boone, NC	L 20–24	12,240	
September 17	VMI		Conrad Stadium; Boone, NC	W 31–0	14,128	
September 24	at The Citadel	No. 18	Johnson Hagood Stadium; Charleston, SC	W 27–16	15,795	
October 1	at East Tennessee State	No. 14	Memorial Center; Johnson City, TN	W 27–11	9,565	
October 8	Chattanooga	No. 10	Conrad Stadium; Boone, NC	L 9–30	13,264	
October 15	Gardner–Webb*	No. 18	Conrad Stadium; Boone, NC	W 21–17	16,621	
October 22	at No. 8 Furman		Paladin Stadium; Greenville, SC	L 0–49	14,973	
November 5	at NC State*		Carter–Finley Stadium; Raleigh, NC	L 7–33	40,800	
November 12	Marshall		Conrad Stadium; Boone, NC (rivalry)	W 28–19	8,112	
November 19	at No. 13 Western Carolina		Whitmire Stadium; Cullowhee, NC (rivalry)	L 15–41	13,924	
*Non-conference game; Rankings from NCAA Division I-AA Football Committee Poll released prior to the game
