= 1983 East Tennessee State Buccaneers football team =

American college football season

1983 East Tennessee State Buccaneers football
- Conference: Southern Conference
- Record: 3–8 (1–6 SoCon)
- Head coach: Buddy Sasser (1st season)
- Defensive coordinator: Mike Ayers (1st season)
- Home stadium: Memorial Center

1983 Southern Conference football standings
| | Conf. | | | | | Overall |
| Team | W | | L | | T | W | | L | | T |
|---|---|---|---|---|---|---|---|---|---|---|
| No. 2 Furman $^ | 6 | – | 0 | – | 1 | 10 | – | 2 | – | 1 |
| No. 9 Western Carolina ^ | 5 | – | 0 | – | 1 | 11 | – | 3 | – | 1 |
| Chattanooga | 5 | – | 2 | – | 0 | 7 | – | 4 | – | 0 |
| Appalachian State | 4 | – | 3 | – | 0 | 6 | – | 5 | – | 0 |
| Marshall | 3 | – | 4 | – | 0 | 4 | – | 7 | – | 0 |
| VMI | 1 | – | 5 | – | 0 | 2 | – | 9 | – | 0 |
| The Citadel | 1 | – | 6 | – | 0 | 3 | – | 8 | – | 0 |
| East Tennessee State | 1 | – | 6 | – | 0 | 3 | – | 8 | – | 0 |
| Davidson | 0 | – | 2 | – | 0 | 2 | – | 8 | – | 0 |
$ – Conference champion; ^ – NCAA Division I-AA playoff participant; Rankings from NCAA Division I-AA Football Committee poll

The 1983 East Tennessee State Buccaneers football team was an American football team that represented East Tennessee State University as a member of the Southern Conference (SoCon) during the 1983 NCAA Division I-AA football season. Led by first-year head coach Buddy Sasser, the Buccaneers compiled and overall record of 3–8, with a mark of 1–6 in conference play, and finished tied for seventh in the SoCon.

== Schedule ==
| Date | Opponent | Site | Result | Attendance | Source |
|---|---|---|---|---|---|
| September 3 | at Eastern Kentucky* | Hanger Field; Richmond, KY | L 15–21 | 9,200 | |
| September 10 | Tennessee Tech* | Memorial Center; Johnson City, TN | W 14–7 | 8,253 | |
| September 24 | at Western Carolina | E. J. Whitmire Stadium; Cullowhee, NC | L 16–17 | | |
| October 1 | No. 14 Appalachian State | Memorial Center; Johnson City, TN | L 11–27 | 9,565 | |
| October 8 | at Marshall | Fairfield Stadium; Huntington, WV | L 10–13 | 7,889 | |
| October 15 | Georgia Southern*^{†} | Memorial Center; Johnson City, TN | W 24–7 | 7,248 | |
| October 22 | at VMI | Alumni Memorial Field; Lexington, VA | L 12–24 | 3,200 | |
| October 29 | at East Carolina* | Ficklen Memorial Stadium; Greenville, NC | L 9–21 | 33,767 | |
| November 5 | at No. 4 Furman | Paladin Stadium; Greenville, SC | L 7–28 | 12,165 | |
| November 12 | The Citadel | Memorial Center; Johnson City, TN | W 45–0 | 4,469 | |
| November 19 | Chattanooga | Memorial Center; Johnson City, TN | L 10–13 | 4,113 | |
*Non-conference game; ^{†}Homecoming; Rankings from NCAA Division I-AA Football Committee Poll released prior to the game
