= 1983 VMI Keydets football team =

American college football season

1983 VMI Keydets football
- Conference: Southern Conference
- Record: 2–9 (1–5 SoCon)
- Head coach: Bob Thalman (13th season)
- Home stadium: Alumni Memorial Field

1983 Southern Conference football standings
	Conf.					Overall
Team	W		L		T	W		L		T
No. 2 Furman $^	6	–	0	–	1	10	–	2	–	1
No. 9 Western Carolina ^	5	–	0	–	1	11	–	3	–	1
Chattanooga	5	–	2	–	0	7	–	4	–	0
Appalachian State	4	–	3	–	0	6	–	5	–	0
Marshall	3	–	4	–	0	4	–	7	–	0
VMI	1	–	5	–	0	2	–	9	–	0
The Citadel	1	–	6	–	0	3	–	8	–	0
East Tennessee State	1	–	6	–	0	3	–	8	–	0
Davidson	0	–	2	–	0	2	–	8	–	0
$ – Conference champion; ^ – NCAA Division I-AA playoff participant; Rankings from NCAA Division I-AA Football Committee poll

The 1983 VMI Keydets football team was an American football team that represented the Virginia Military Institute (VMI) as a member of the Southern Conference (SoCon) during the 1983 NCAA Division I-AA football season. In their 13th year under head coach Bob Thalman, the team compiled an overall record of 2–9 with a mark of 1–5 in conference play, placing sixth in the SoCon.

== Schedule ==
Date	Opponent	Site	Result	Attendance	Source
September 10	William & Mary*	Alumni Memorial Field; Lexington, VA (rivalry)	L 14–28		
September 17	at Appalachian State	Conrad Stadium; Boone, NC	L 0–31	14,128	
September 24	at Virginia Tech*	Lane Stadium; Blacksburg, VA (rivalry)	L 0–28	32,300	
October 1	No. 6 Furman	Alumni Memorial Field; Lexington, VA	L 0–49	5,900	
October 6	The Citadel	Alumni Memorial Field; Lexington, VA (rivalry)	L 6–27	6,300	
October 15	at Virginia*	Scott Stadium; Charlottesville, VA	L 10–38	30,389	
October 22	East Tennessee State	Alumni Memorial Field; Lexington, VA	W 24–12	3,200	
October 29	Richmond*	Alumni Memorial Field; Lexington, VA (rivalry)	L 19–35	4,600	
November 5	at Chattanooga	Chamberlain Field; Chattanooga, TN	L 6–23	7,488	
November 12	Maine*	Alumni Memorial Field; Lexington, VA	W 14–12		
November 19	at Marshall	Fairfield Stadium; Huntington, WV	L 7–56	6,808	
*Non-conference game; Rankings from NCAA Division I-AA Football Committee poll Poll released prior to the game
