= 1983 The Citadel Bulldogs football team =

American college football season

1983 The Citadel Bulldogs football
- Conference: Southern Conference
- Record: 3–8 (2–6 SoCon)
- Head coach: Tom Moore (1st season)
- Home stadium: Johnson Hagood Stadium

1983 Southern Conference football standings
	Conf.					Overall
Team	W		L		T	W		L		T
No. 2 Furman $^	6	–	0	–	1	10	–	2	–	1
No. 9 Western Carolina ^	5	–	0	–	1	11	–	3	–	1
Chattanooga	5	–	2	–	0	7	–	4	–	0
Appalachian State	4	–	3	–	0	6	–	5	–	0
Marshall	3	–	4	–	0	4	–	7	–	0
VMI	1	–	5	–	0	2	–	9	–	0
The Citadel	1	–	6	–	0	3	–	8	–	0
East Tennessee State	1	–	6	–	0	3	–	8	–	0
Davidson	0	–	2	–	0	2	–	8	–	0
$ – Conference champion; ^ – NCAA Division I-AA playoff participant; Rankings from NCAA Division I-AA Football Committee poll

The 1983 The Citadel Bulldogs football team represented The Citadel, The Military College of South Carolina in the 1983 NCAA Division I-AA football season. Tom Moore served as head coach for the first season. The Bulldogs played as members of the Southern Conference and played home games at Johnson Hagood Stadium.

== Schedule ==
Date	Opponent	Site	Result	Attendance	Source
September 10	Presbyterian*	Johnson Hagood Stadium; Charleston, SC	W 35–7	17,240	
September 17	at NC State*	Carter–Finley Stadium; Raleigh, NC	L 0–45	41,300	
September 24	No. 18 Appalachian State	Johnson Hagood Stadium; Charleston, SC	L 16–27	15,795	
October 1	vs. Tennessee*	Liberty Bowl Memorial Stadium; Memphis, TN	L 6–45	20,351	
October 6	at VMI	Alumni Memorial Field; Lexington, VA (Military Classic of the South)	W 27–6	6,300	
October 15	at Chattanooga	Chamberlain Field; Chattanooga, TN	L 9–30	10,203	
October 22	Davidson	Johnson Hagood Stadium; Charleston, SC	W 41–12	15,560	
October 29	at Marshall	Fairfield Stadium; Huntington, WV	L 10–26	8,788	
November 5	No. T–20 Western Carolina	Johnson Hagood Stadium; Charleston, SC	L 17–44	13,240	
November 12	at East Tennessee State	Memorial Center; Johnson City, TN	L 0–45	4,469	
November 19	No. T–2 Furman^{†}	Johnson Hagood Stadium; Charleston, SC (rivalry)	L 21–49	17,890	
*Non-conference game; ^{†}Homecoming; Rankings from NCAA Division I-AA Football Committee Poll released prior to the game
