= Bob Waters =

American football player and coach, college athletics administrator (1938–1989)

- Waters in 1961

No. 11
- Position: Quarterback

Personal information
- Born: June 22, 1938; Millen, Georgia, U.S.
- Died: May 29, 1989 (aged 50); Cullowhee, North Carolina, U.S.
- Listed height: 6 ft 2 in (1.88 m)
- Listed weight: 184 lb (83 kg)

Career information
- High school: Screven County (GA)
- College: Presbyterian
- NFL draft: 1960: 7th round, 83rd overall pick
- AFL draft: 1960

Career history

Playing
- San Francisco 49ers (1960–1963)

Coaching
- Presbyterian (1966–1967) Assistant coach; Stanford (1968) Wide receivers coach; Western Carolina (1969–1988) Head coach

Operations
- Western Carolina (1971–1986) Athletic director

Career NFL statistics
- Passing attempts: 124
- Passing completions: 59
- Completion percentage: 47.6%
- TD–INT: 3–8
- Passing yards: 707
- Passer rating: 46.7
- Stats at Pro Football Reference

Head coaching record
- Career: 116–94–6 (.551)

Robert Lee Waters (June 22, 1938 – May 29, 1989) was an American professional football player, coach, and administrator, best known for his contributions to athletics at Western Carolina University. Waters coached the Western Carolina Catamounts football team for 20 seasons (1969–1988), and performed the dual role of athletic director from 1971 through 1986. According to the university, "the evolution and success of the school's athletic programs, especially its football program, during that period can be attributed largely to his talents and personality".

== Early life ==
Bob Waters grew up in Sylvania, Georgia, and was a successful athlete at Screven County High School, receiving 11 varsity letters for his participation in three different sports.

He initially entered Stetson University in DeLand, Florida, as a freshman quarterback and defensive back; but when Stetson dropped the school's football program at the end of his first season Waters transferred to Presbyterian College in Clinton, South Carolina, where he served as a quarterback and defensive back on the college's team. The team was invited to the January 1960 Tangerine Bowl, meeting Middle Tennessee State; despite losing by a score of 21–12, Waters was named the game's most outstanding player. Waters was a member of the Mu chapter of the Pi Kappa Alpha fraternity at Presbyterian College.

== Professional career ==
The National Football League's San Francisco 49ers and American Football League's Los Angeles Chargers both drafted Waters in 1960. After signing with the 49ers, Waters finished his four-year career with three touchdown passes and eight interceptions. Waters' four years with the 49ers included one as a defensive back and four as quarterback.

== Coach and administrator ==
Waters changed career in 1965, going to Presbyterian College as an assistant coach in 1966. After two seasons with Presbyterian, Waters moved back to the West Coast as an assistant at Stanford University.

Waters as head coach at Western Carolina.

In 1969, Waters took a football coaching job at Western Carolina, bringing in a victorious season for the 1969 Catamounts in his first year, only losing to his alma mater Presbyterian College. Under his guidance, the team made national rankings in 1972 and 1974, and he took the Catamounts to the 1983 NCAA Division I-AA Football Championship Game.

According to the university's website, his tenure at Western Carolina produced "116 victories, 13 winning seasons and top 10 national finishes at three different levels (NAIA, NCAA Division II, NCAA Division I-AA)". He coached 13 All-Americans and 36 All-Southern Conference players. During the 1971–1986 seasons, Waters also served as athletic director. During his service to the university, he directed Western Carolina's moves from NAIA to NCAA Division II, then to NCAA Division I, and gained entrance into the Southern Conference. He helped raise interest in the construction of E. J. Whitmire Stadium in 1974 and Hennon Stadium in 1986.

== Death and legacy ==
In March 1989, during the progression of amyotrophic lateral sclerosis (ALS, or Lou Gehrig's disease), Waters was reassigned from his head coaching position by university chancellor Myron Coulter. Waters died on May 29, 1989, at his home in Cullowhee, North Carolina, at the age of 50 following a six-year battle with the disease.

Waters was one of three 49ers teammates who died of ALS, a rare disease with an incidence estimated at 1 per 50,000 individuals in the general population. Others 49ers stricken by the disease included contemporaries Gary Lewis and Matt Hazeltine and — a generation later — wide receiver Dwight Clark.

Following his diagnosis with ALS, Waters devoted the final years of his life trying to find answers to solve the connection between ALS and the 49ers. Waters contacted as many of his former teammates as possible to see if they were experiencing similar problems and studies were done that examined the use of DMSO, painkillers, and the fertilizer used on the 49ers practice field in Redwood City, California in an effort to isolate a potential chemical connection. A possible connection between the disease and mild traumatic brain injury (concussion) is a matter of ongoing study.

In 1988, Waters was honored by Western Carolina, who named their playing field Bob Waters Field at E. J. Whitmire Stadium. Waters has been inducted into the South Carolina Athletic Hall of Fame, the Florida Citrus Bowl Hall of Fame, and the Western Carolina Athletic Hall of Fame.

== Head coaching record ==
Year	Team	Overall	Conference	Standing	Bowl/playoffs	NCAA^{#}
Western Carolina Catamounts (NCAA College Division / NCAA Division II independent) (1969–1976)
1969	Western Carolina	9–1				
1970	Western Carolina	6–3				
1971	Western Carolina	4–6				
1972	Western Carolina	7–2–1				
1973	Western Carolina	6–3–1				
1974	Western Carolina	9–2			L NCAA Division II First Round	
1975	Western Carolina	3–7				
1976	Western Carolina	6–4				
Western Carolina Catamounts (Southern Conference) (1977–1988)
1977	Western Carolina	6–4–1	2–2–1	5th		
1978	Western Carolina	6–5	4–2	T–3rd		
1979	Western Carolina	6–5	2–4	7th		
1980	Western Carolina	3–7–1	2–4–1	5th		
1981	Western Carolina	4–7	3–4	6th		
1982	Western Carolina	6–5	4–2	3rd		
1983	Western Carolina	11–3–1	5–0–1	2nd	L NCAA Division I-AA Championship	9
1984	Western Carolina	8–3	5–2	2nd		14
1985	Western Carolina	4–6–1	2–4–1	T–5th		
1986	Western Carolina	6–5	5–2	2nd		
1987	Western Carolina	4–7	2–4	T–5th		
1988	Western Carolina	2–9	1–6	T–7th		
Western Carolina:		116–94–6				
Total:		116–94–6				
