= 1983 Duke Blue Devils football team =

American college football season

1983 Duke Blue Devils football
- Conference: Atlantic Coast Conference
- Record: 3–8 (3–3 ACC)
- Head coach: Steve Sloan (1st season)
- Offensive coordinator: John Cropp (1st season)
- Defensive coordinator: Richard Bell (1st season)
- MVP: Mike Grayson
- Captains: Phil Ebinger; Ben Bennett; Mike Grayson; Bill Smith
- Home stadium: Wallace Wade Stadium

1983 Atlantic Coast Conference football standings
	Conf.					Overall
Team	W		L		T	W		L		T
Maryland $	5	–	0	–	0	8	–	4	–	0
North Carolina	4	–	2	–	0	8	–	4	–	0
Georgia Tech	3	–	2	–	0	3	–	8	–	0
Virginia	3	–	3	–	0	6	–	5	–	0
Duke	3	–	3	–	0	3	–	8	–	0
Wake Forest	1	–	5	–	0	4	–	7	–	0
NC State	1	–	5	–	0	3	–	8	–	0
No. 11 Clemson *	0	–	0	–	0	9	–	1	–	1
$ – Conference champion; * – Clemson was under NCAA and ACC probation and was ineligible for the ACC title. As a result, their ACC games did not count in the league standings.; Rankings from AP Poll

The 1983 Duke Blue Devils football team was an American football team that represented Duke University as a member of the Atlantic Coast Conference (ACC) during the 1983 NCAA Division I-A football season. In their first year under head coach Steve Sloan, the Blue Devils compiled an overall record of 3–8, with a conference record of 3–3, and finished tied for fourth in the ACC.

== Schedule ==
Date	Opponent	Site	TV	Result	Attendance	Source
September 3	at Virginia	Scott Stadium; Charlottesville, VA		L 30–38	28,947	
September 10	at Indiana*	Memorial Stadium; Bloomington, IN		L 10–15	41,120	
September 17	South Carolina*	Wallace Wade Stadium; Durham, NC		L 24–31	20,500	
October 1	No. 15 Miami (FL)*	Wallace Wade Stadium; Durham, NC	ABC	L 17–56	28,750	
October 8	at Virginia Tech*	Lane Stadium; Blacksburg, VA		L 14–27	40,700	
October 15	Clemson*^{A}	Wallace Wade Stadium; Durham, NC		L 31–38	19,300	
October 22	at No. 15 Maryland	Byrd Stadium; College Park, MD		L 3–38	40,100	
October 29	Georgia Tech^{†}	Wallace Wade Stadium; Durham, NC		W 32–26	17,650	
November 5	at Wake Forest	Groves Stadium; Winston-Salem, NC		W 31–21	21,400	
November 10	NC State	Wallace Wade Stadium; Durham, NC (rivalry)	TBS	W 27–26	19,100	
November 19	at North Carolina	Kenan Memorial Stadium; Chapel Hill, NC (Victory Bell)		L 27–34	49,500	
*Non-conference game; ^{†}Homecoming; Rankings from AP Poll released prior to the game

Clemson was under NCAA probation, therefore this game did not count in the league standings.
