= 1983 Furman Paladins football team =

American college football season

1983 Furman Paladins football

SoCon champion

NCAA Division I-AA Semifinal, L 7–14 vs. Western Carolina
- Conference: Southern Conference
- Record: 10–2–1 (6–0–1 SoCon)
- Head coach: Dick Sheridan (6th season)
- Captains: David Charpia; Ernest Gibson
- Home stadium: Paladin Stadium

1983 Southern Conference football standings
	Conf.					Overall
Team	W		L		T	W		L		T
No. 2 Furman $^	6	–	0	–	1	10	–	2	–	1
No. 9 Western Carolina ^	5	–	0	–	1	11	–	3	–	1
Chattanooga	5	–	2	–	0	7	–	4	–	0
Appalachian State	4	–	3	–	0	6	–	5	–	0
Marshall	3	–	4	–	0	4	–	7	–	0
VMI	1	–	5	–	0	2	–	9	–	0
The Citadel	1	–	6	–	0	3	–	8	–	0
East Tennessee State	1	–	6	–	0	3	–	8	–	0
Davidson	0	–	2	–	0	2	–	8	–	0
$ – Conference champion; ^ – NCAA Division I-AA playoff participant; Rankings from NCAA Division I-AA Football Committee poll

The 1983 Furman Paladins football team was an American football team that represented Furman University as a member of the Southern Conference (SoCon) during the 1983 NCAA Division I-AA football season. In their sixth year under head coach Dick Sheridan, the Paladins compiled an overall record of 10–2–1 with a conference mark of 6–0–1, winning the SoCon title for the fourth consecutive season. Furman advanced to the NCAA Division I-AA Football Championship playoffs, where they defeated Boston University in the quarterfinals and were upset by Western Carolina in the semifinals.

== Schedule ==
Date	Opponent	Rank	Site	Result	Attendance	Source
September 3	at South Carolina State*		State College Stadium; Orangeburg, SC	L 3–13	14,823	
September 10	Carson–Newman*		Paladin Stadium; Greenville, SC	W 52–7	9,226	
September 17	at Georgia Tech*		Grant Field; Atlanta, GA	W 17–14	24,311	
September 24	Marshall	No. 5	Paladin Stadium; Greenville, SC	W 31–7	8,514	
October 1	at VMI	No. 6	Alumni Memorial Field; Lexington, VA	W 49–0	5,900	
October 15	at Western Carolina	No. 5	Whitmire Stadium; Cullowhee, NC	T 17–17	11,642	
October 22	Appalachian State	No. 8	Paladin Stadium; Greenville, SC	W 49–0	14,973	
October 29	at Davidson	No. 8	Richardson Stadium; Davidson, NC	W 55–7	3,800	
November 5	East Tennessee State	No. 4	Paladin Stadium; Greenville, SC	W 28–7	12,165	
November 12	Chattanooga	No. 4	Paladin Stadium; Greenville, SC	W 28–14	10,021	
November 19	at The Citadel	No. T–2	Johnson Hagood Stadium; Charleston, SC (rivalry)	W 49–21	17,890	
December 3	No. T–13 Boston University	No. 2	Paladin Stadium; Greenville, SC (NCAA Division I-AA Quarterfinal)	W 35–16	7,879	
December 10	No. 9 Western Carolina	No. 2	Paladin Stadium; Greenville, SC (NCAA Division I-AA Semifinal)	L 7–14	13,034	
*Non-conference game; Rankings from NCAA Division I-AA Football Committee Poll released prior to the game
