= Florida State Football Sod Cemetery =

College football monument in Florida

Coordinates: 30.439851°N 84.304698°W

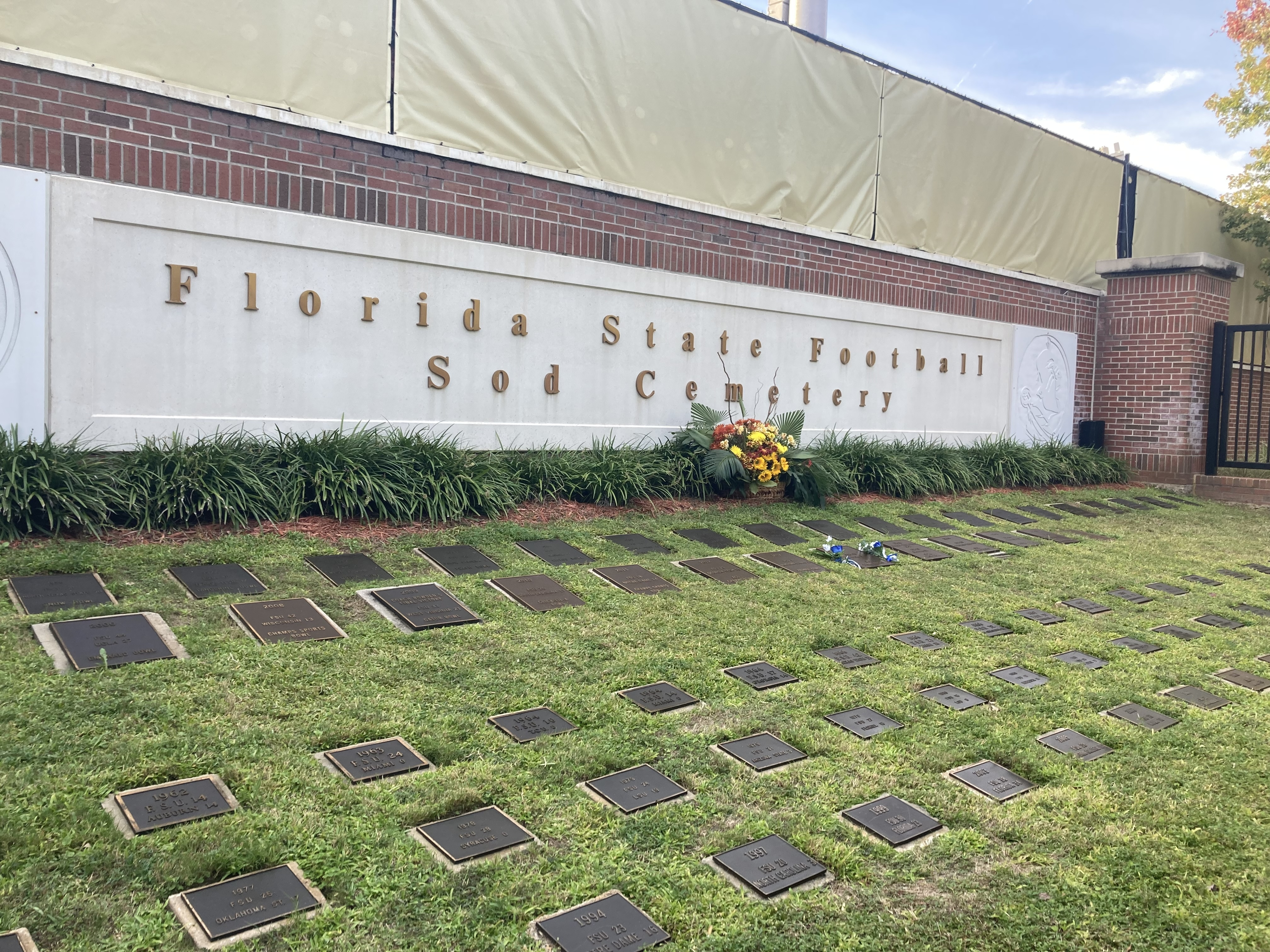
- Florida State Football Sod Cemetery in 2023
- Interactive map of Florida State Football Sod Cemetery
- Location: Tallahassee, Florida, US

The Florida State Football Sod Cemetery is a monument that memorializes a longstanding college football tradition that dates back to 1962. It features over 100 bronze plaques, each commemorating a "sod game." Sod games represent the Seminoles' victories away from the team's home in Tallahassee. Interred beneath each bronze plaque is a piece of sod—a fragment from the field—that is extracted from the stadiums where the Seminoles won.

In the summer of 2013, Florida State built new practice fields, and the cemetery was moved to its current location. The sod cemetery is situated 200 feet north of Doak Campbell Stadium (Gate M) and just outside the entrance to the Al Dunlap Seminole Practice Fields. Each marker represents a day when the Seminoles went on the road and won.

== Criteria and evolution ==
Sod games are traditionally designated as away games that meet the following criteria:

1. Florida State plays as the underdog, against a higher-ranked opponent.
2. The game is a road game against the University of Florida.
3. The game is a championship match up, such as the ACC Championship or a National Championship.
4. The game is a post-regular season bowl game.
5. The game is designated a sod game by Florida State's head coach.

Initially, the criteria for a sod game centered around the Seminoles securing victories in matches where they were not expected to win. However, as the team became more successful, the tradition's parameters expanded. By the early 1980s, the ritual saw a notable inclusion: all bowl games started being treated as sod games. This was evident from their victories, starting with the Gator Bowl in 1982, proceeding with other significant bowl wins in subsequent years.

As the tradition has evolved, exceptions have been made for landmark road wins that do not meet the first four criteria. For example, on September 28, 2023, the hosts at Warchant TV, a YouTube channel focused on Florida State sports, discussed this topic following the 2023 season win over Clemson at Memorial Stadium. A source, reportedly close to the program, stated that the number one rule is that the head coach has the final say on whether a game is a sod game, even if it does not strictly meet the established criteria. This can happen in situations in which Florida State is a slight favorite, but it is still a big game.

The team has a dynamic approach to traditions, with adapted practices like the “Breaking the Rock” tradition, brought forward and modified by Head Coach Mike Norvell and Director of Strength and Conditioning Josh Storms.

== Origin and history ==
The Florida State Sod Cemetery has its roots embedded in a 1962 match against the fifth-ranked Georgia Bulldogs at Sanford Stadium. Dean Coyle Moore, a sociology professor and a member of Florida State's athletic board, was the originator of the tradition. Moore, who helped field Florida State's first football team in 1947 with President Doak Campbell, was seen as a mentor to many of the players and would often give pep talks to the team. From 1905 until 1947, Florida State had been a women's college, and Moore wanted to instill a scrappy mentality in the program.

Ahead of the matchup as the Seminoles completed their Thursday practice, Moore gave a speech, ending it with: “win, and bring back some sod from between the hedges at Georgia.” On Saturday, October 20, 1962, the Seminoles beat the odds and emerged victorious with an 18–0 win. Team captains Gene McDowell and Red Dawson honored Moore's directive, bringing a piece of sod back to Tallahassee in a paper Coca-Cola cup. “We got a piece of sod and took it back to Tallahassee,” McDowell said. “Red had it in his pocket or something.” The sod was presented to Moore at the next football practice.

The sod was kept on a mantle in Moore's home parlor until his wife, Mabee Boysworth Moore, told him to remove it. Moore and head coach Bill Peterson had the sod buried on the practice field as a symbol of victory. A monument was placed to commemorate the win, marking the beginning of the Sod Cemetery. It has since been the final resting place for pieces of turf from significant road wins and bowl games. The cemetery holds the pieces of sod from games played at stadiums like the Gator Bowl, Ohio Stadium, and Notre Dame Stadium.

Bobby Bowden, who served as an assistant from 1963 and the head coach from 1976 to 2009, had an influential role in contributing to the legacy of the Sod Cemetery. Under his leadership, the Seminoles contributed many patches of sod to the cemetery.

Bowden remarked about the challenges the tradition posed when games were played on AstroTurf, a surface in many stadiums during his tenure, saying, “It got to be a problem when we played on AstroTurf. I mean, you’ve got to have a big pair of scissors, boy! And I’m not sure they liked it.” This was in reference to a game after the 1988 season when the team played and won at the Sugar Bowl against Auburn. Odell Haggins, then a defensive lineman, now a longtime Florida State assistant coach, cut out a piece of the Superdome turf, leading to a $500 bill for Florida State. Learning from this experience, the next time the Seminoles played in the Sugar Bowl, officials presented them with a precut sample of the carpet, preventing further turf-cutting.

Heisman Trophy winner Charlie Ward described the sense of pride and accomplishment players experienced from the Sod Cemetery tradition. Ward, who once was the Seminoles quarterback, recalls the sense of resolve that the players felt during sod games, saying, “You took pride in knowing you were on the road, and you were supposed to lose.”

A receiver for the Seminoles, Matt Frier appeared on the cover of Sports Illustrated following the national championship win in the 1993 season.

As a result of an NCAA ruling in 2010, Florida State had to vacate victories across multiple sports due to an academic fraud scandal during the 2006 and 2007 seasons. This encompassed a range of games, including one sod game win from 2006: the 44-27 Emerald Bowl victory over UCLA.

In 2021, a bronze plaque was added to the cemetery's brick column beneath the main historic plaque; the new plaque reads: “During the seasons of 1976-2009, Coach Bobby Bowden and his teams won 63 Sod Victories.”

== Care and stewardship ==
In 1988, Dean Coyle Moore, the initial keeper of the Sod Cemetery, entrusted Tallahassee attorney Douglas Mannheimer with the stewardship of the tradition, requesting him to succeed as the caretaker and proposing that his son, Andrew, eventually inherit the role. Mannheimer's oversees the physical upkeep of the cemetery, ensuring that each piece of sod and its corresponding marker are well-maintained, and also serves as an ambassador of the tradition to the broader community and new generations of Seminoles' football players. Every year, Mannheimer addresses the entire football team, explaining the origins, significance, and continuing importance of the sod tradition.

Mannheimer instructs the team captains on the appropriate methods to remove the sod from the fields, explaining how to look for divots and use hands or scissors to remove a small square of sod. Mannheimer also coordinates various university entities and stakeholders, groups like the Extra Points Club and university staff.

Douglas Mannheimer's wife, Cricket, an FSU graduate and ballet instructor, is responsible for the flower arrangements around the Sod Cemetery, particularly on game days. Douglas Mannheimer often emphasizes his wife's role in this tradition, stating, "Cricket has done our SodTalk and Sod Cemetery flowers for nearly 30 years now. She enjoys Florida State, but she mainly does it just to help me. Cricket has helped the Sod Cemetery become a beautiful place on game day, and it’s all her hands and her efforts."

Douglas Mannheimer was inducted into the FSU Hall of Fame in recognition of his contributions. He reflected on this experience, “That was a phenomenal honor... I’m a fan who has lived in Tallahassee and a fan who Dean Coyle Moore asked to carry on a tradition."

== Sod Game rituals and procedures ==
If an upcoming match-up is deemed a sod game, the Florida State head coach will alert Mannheimer and choose a sod captain on Thursday. Before leaving any of these games, Seminole captains gather their teammates to explain the significance of the tradition. Victorious captains return with a piece of the opponent's turf to be buried in the Sod Cemetery. Mannheimer will usually receive the sod in a plastic bag on Sunday afternoon. Mannheimer then orders a marker from a West Virginia foundry that makes the engraved tombstones, flat on top and extending three feet into the ground. Until it's ready to bury, the dirt is kept in an undisclosed location. Each new addition undergoes a formal burial ceremony accompanied by a speech and moment of silence. On gamedays, that sod will sometimes be placed in an open casket with sashes and flowers, so fans can pay their respects.

== Engagement and remembrance ==
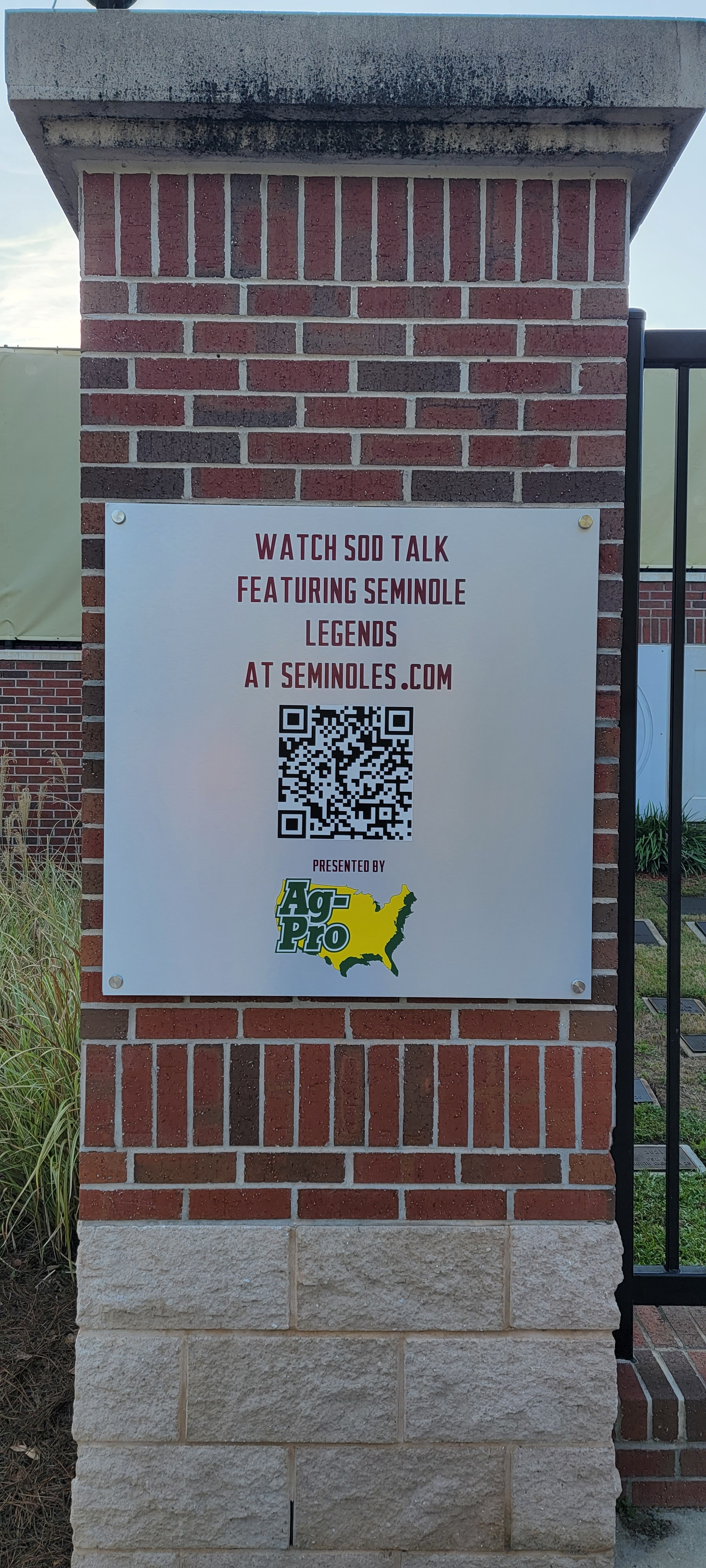

At the Sod Cemetery, fans and visitors can access an audio history of the sod game tradition with the push a button or the scan of a QR code. On game days, a longer audio loop with the history, radio calls of plays, and comments from players are heard at the cemetery during visits. Additionally, color-coordinated flower arrangements adorn the markers, reflecting the hues of the visiting team. For instance, during a home game against the Florida Gators, the graves with sod victories from past Florida matches display a blend of blue and orange flowers, while the remainder of the cemetery generally features garnet and gold flowers.

From 2014 until the pandemic season of 2020, fans gathered at the Sod Cemetery 90 minutes before the kickoff for Sod Talk, where former Seminole players returned to tell the gathered fans about their days at Florida State. Notable participants included Charlie Ward, Warrick Dunn, Derrick Brooks, Marvin Jones, Fred Biletnikoff, Ron Simmons, Ron Sellers, Peter Warrick and Leroy Butler. Since the 2020 season, the live Gameday Sod Talks have been replaced by videos, produced by the university's Seminole Productions. Notable participants in these presentations have included Bobby Bowden, Ron Sellers, Charlie Ward, Warrick Dunn, Kez McCorvey, Matt Frier, Peter Boulware, Corey Simon and Lemarcus Joyner.

== Florida State Sod Games ==
Bowl game victories are colored ██ gold. Championship victories are colored ██ garnet.

| Date | Location | Opponent | Score |
|---|---|---|---|
| October 20, 1962 | Sanford Stadium | Georgia | 18–0 |
| November 10, 1962 | Grant Field | Georgia Tech | 14–14 |
| November 24, 1962 | Cliff Hare Stadium | Auburn | 14–14 |
| September 20, 1963 | Miami Orange Bowl | Miami | 24–0 |
| September 19, 1964 | Miami Orange Bowl | Miami | 14–0 |
| September 26, 1964 | Amon G. Carter Stadium | Texas Christian | 10–0 |
| October 17, 1964 | Sanford Stadium | Georgia | 17–14 |
| January 2, 1965 | Gator Bowl Stadium (GATOR BOWL) | Oklahoma | 36–19 |
| September 24, 1966 | Miami Orange Bowl | Miami | 23–20 |
| October 15, 1966 | Jones Stadium | Texas Tech | 42–33 |
| November 5, 1966 | Carolina Stadium | South Carolina | 32–10 |
| September 23, 1967 | Legion Field | Alabama | 37-37 |
| October 7, 1967 | Kyle Field | Texas A&M | 19–18 |
| November 4, 1967 | Memphis Memorial Stadium | Memphis State | 27–7 |
| November 25, 1967 | Florida Field | Florida | 21–16 |
| December 30, 1967 | Gator Bowl Stadium (GATOR BOWL) | Penn State | 17-17 |
| October 26, 1968 | Carolina Stadium | South Carolina | 35–28 |
| November 16, 1968 | Carter Stadium | N.C. State | 48–7 |
| November 29, 1968 | Gator Bowl Stadium | Houston | 40–20 |
| September 26, 1969 | Miami Orange Bowl | Miami | 19–14 |
| November 8, 1969 | Lane Stadium | Virginia Tech | 10-10 |
| October 24, 1970 | Carolina Stadium | South Carolina | 21–13 |
| October 30, 1970 | Miami Orange Bowl | Miami | 27–3 |
| October 9, 1976 | Alumni Stadium | Boston College | 28–9 |
| November 13, 1976 | Fouts Field | N. Texas State | 21–20 |
| October 1, 1977 | Lewis Field | Oklahoma State | 25–17 |
| December 3, 1977 | Florida Field | Florida | 34–9 |
| December 23, 1977 | Orlando Stadium (TANGERINE BOWL) | Texas Tech | 40–17 |
| September 9, 1978 | Archbold Stadium | Syracuse | 28–0 |
| September 15, 1979 | Tampa Stadium | Arizona State | 31–3 |
| October 27, 1979 | Tiger Stadium | LSU | 24–19 |
| November 23, 1979 | Florida Field | Florida | 27–16 |
| September 6, 1980 | Tiger Stadium | LSU | 16–0 |
| October 4, 1980 | Memorial Stadium | Nebraska | 18–14 |
| October 3, 1981 | Ohio Stadium | Ohio State | 36–27 |
| October 10, 1981 | Notre Dame Stadium | Notre Dame | 19–13 |
| October 2, 1982 | Ohio Stadium | Ohio State | 34–17 |
| October 30, 1982 | Miami Orange Bowl | Miami | 24–7 |
| December 30, 1982 | Gator Bowl Stadium (GATOR BOWL) | West Virginia | 31–12 |
| September 10, 1983 | Tiger Stadium | LSU | 40–35 |
| October 29, 1983 | Sun Devil Stadium | Arizona State | 29–26 |
| December 30, 1983 | Atlanta-Fulton County Stadium (PEACH BOWL) | North Carolina | 28–3 |
| September 22, 1984 | Miami Orange Bowl | Miami | 38–3 |
| November 3, 1984 | Sun Devil Stadium | Arizona State | 42–44 |
| December 22, 1984 | Florida Citrus Bowl Stadium (CITRUS BOWL) | Georgia | 17-17 |
| September 7, 1985 | Memorial Stadium | Nebraska | 17–13 |
| December 30, 1985 | Gator Bowl Stadium (GATOR BOWL) | Oklahoma State | 34–23 |
| December 31, 1986 | Legion Field (ALL-AMERICAN BOWL) | Indiana | 27–13 |
| September 26, 1987 | Spartan Stadium | Michigan State | 31–3 |
| November 7, 1987 | Jordan-Hare Stadium | Auburn | 34–6 |
| November 28, 1987 | Florida Field | Florida | 28–14 |
| January 1, 1988 | Sun Devil Stadium (FIESTA BOWL) | Nebraska | 31–28 |
| September 17, 1988 | Clemson Memorial Stadium | Clemson | 24–21 |
| January 2, 1989 | Louisiana Superdome (SUGAR BOWL) | Auburn | 13–7 |
| December 2, 1989 | Ben Hill Griffin Stadium | Florida | 24–17 |
| January 1, 1990 | Sun Devil Stadium (FIESTA BOWL) | Nebraska | 41–17 |
| December 28, 1990 | Joe Robbie Stadium (BLOCKBUSTER BOWL) | Penn State | 24–17 |
| September 28, 1991 | Michigan Stadium | Michigan | 51–31 |
| January 1, 1992 | Cotton Bowl Stadium (COTTON BOWL) | Texas A&M | 10–2 |
| September 12, 1992 | Clemson Memorial Stadium | Clemson | 24–20 |

| Date | Location | Opponent | Score |
|---|---|---|---|
| October 17, 1992 | Bobby Dodd Stadium | Georgia Tech | 29–24 |
| January 1, 1993 | Miami Orange Bowl (ORANGE BOWL) | Nebraska | 27–14 |
| November 27, 1993 | Ben Hill Griffin Stadium | Florida | 33–21 |
| January 1, 1994 | Miami Orange Bowl (NATIONAL CHAMPIONSHIP) | Nebraska | 18–16 |
| November 12, 1994 | Orlando Citrus Bowl Stadium | Notre Dame | 23–16 |
| January 2, 1995 | Louisiana Superdome (SUGAR BOWL) | Florida | 23–17 |
| January 1, 1996 | Miami Orange Bowl (ORANGE BOWL) | Notre Dame | 31–26 |
| November 8, 1997 | Kenan Memorial Stadium | North Carolina | 20–3 |
| January 1, 1998 | Louisiana Superdome (SUGAR BOWL) | Ohio State | 31–14 |
| November 20, 1999 | Ben Hill Griffin Stadium | Florida | 30–23 |
| January 4, 2000 | Louisiana Superdome (NATIONAL CHAMPIONSHIP) | Virginia Tech | 46–29 |
| January 1, 2002 | Alltel Stadium (GATOR BOWL) | Virginia Tech | 30–17 |
| November 29, 2003 | Ben Hill Griffin Stadium | Florida | 38–34 |
| January 1, 2005 | Alltel Stadium (GATOR BOWL) | West Virginia | 30–18 |
| September 17, 2005 | Alumni Stadium | Boston College | 28–17 |
| December 3, 2005 | Alltel Stadium (ACC CHAMPIONSHIP) | Virginia Tech | 27–22 |
| September 4, 2006 | Miami Orange Bowl | Miami | 13–10 |
| December 27, 2006 | AT&T Park (EMERALD BOWL) | UCLA | 44–27 |
| November 3, 2007 | Alumni Stadium | Boston College | 27–17 |
| October 4, 2008 | Dolphin Stadium | Miami | 41–39 |
| November 22, 2008 | Byrd Stadium | Maryland | 37–3 |
| December 27, 2008 | Citrus Bowl Stadium (CHAMPS SPORTS BOWL) | Wisconsin | 42–13 |
| September 19, 2009 | LaVell Edwards Stadium | Brigham Young | 54–28 |
| October 22, 2009 | Kenan Memorial Stadium | North Carolina | 30–27 |
| November 14, 2009 | BB&T Field | Wake Forest | 41–28 |
| January 1, 2010 | Jacksonville Municipal Stadium (GATOR BOWL) | West Virginia | 33–21 |
| October 9, 2010 | Sun Life Stadium | Miami | 45–17 |
| December 31, 2010 | Georgia Dome (CHICK-FIL-A BOWL) | South Carolina | 26–17 |
| November 26, 2011 | Ben Hill Griffin Stadium | Florida | 21–7 |
| December 29, 2011 | Citrus Bowl Stadium (CHAMPS SPORTS BOWL) | Notre Dame | 18–14 |
| December 1, 2012 | Bank of America Stadium (ACC CHAMPIONSHIP) | Georgia Tech | 21–15 |
| January 1, 2013 | Sun Life Stadium (ORANGE BOWL) | Northern Illinois | 31–10 |
| October 19, 2013 | Clemson Memorial Stadium | Clemson | 51–14 |
| November 30, 2013 | Ben Hill Griffin Stadium | Florida | 37–7 |
| December 7, 2013 | Bank of America Stadium (ACC CHAMPIONSHIP) | Duke | 45–7 |
| January 6, 2014 | Rose Bowl Stadium (NATIONAL CHAMPIONSHIP) | Auburn | 34–31 |
| December 6, 2014 | Bank of America Stadium (ACC CHAMPIONSHIP) | Georgia Tech | 37–35 |
| November 28, 2015 | Ben Hill Griffin Stadium | Florida | 27–2 |
| October 8, 2016 | Hard Rock Stadium | Miami | 20–19 |
| December 30, 2016 | Hard Rock Stadium (ORANGE BOWL) | Michigan | 33–32 |
| November 25, 2017 | Ben Hill Griffin Stadium | Florida | 38–22 |
| December 27, 2017 | Independence Stadium (INDEPENDENCE BOWL) | Southern Mississippi | 42–13 |
| November 9, 2019 | Alumni Stadium | Boston College | 38–31 |
| October 9, 2021 | Kenan Memorial Stadium | North Carolina | 35–25 |
| November 20, 2021 | Alumni Stadium | Boston College | 26–23 |
| September 4, 2022 | Caesar's Superdome | LSU | 24–23 |
| December 29, 2022 | Camping World Stadium (CHEEZ-IT BOWL) | Oklahoma | 35–32 |
| September 3, 2023 | Camping World Stadium | LSU | 45–24 |
| September 23, 2023 | Clemson Memorial Stadium | Clemson | 31-24 (OT) |
| November 25, 2023 | Ben Hill Griffin Stadium | Florida | 24–15 |
| December 2, 2023 | Bank of America Stadium (ACC CHAMPIONSHIP) | Louisville | 16–6 |
| November 13, 2026 | Acrisure Stadium | Pittsburgh | 16-10 |

== Interments per opponent ==
| Opponent | Interments |
|---|---|
| Alabama | 1 |
| Arizona State | 3 |
| Auburn | 4 |
| Boston College | 5 |
| Brigham Young | 1 |
| Clemson | 4 |
| Duke | 1 |
| Florida | 14 |
| Georgia | 3 |
| Georgia Tech | 4 |
| Houston | 1 |
| Indiana | 1 |
| LSU | 6 |
| Louisville | 1 |
| Maryland | 1 |
| Memphis State | 1 |
| Miami | 11 |
| Michigan | 2 |
| Michigan State | 1 |
| N. Texas State | 1 |
| N.C. State | 1 |
| Nebraska | 6 |
| North Carolina | 3 |
| Northern Illinois | 1 |
| Notre Dame | 4 |
| Ohio State | 3 |
| Oklahoma | 2 |
| Oklahoma State | 2 |
| Penn State | 2 |
| Pitt | 1 |
| South Carolina | 4 |
| Southern Mississippi | 1 |
| Syracuse | 1 |
| TCU | 1 |
| Texas A&M | 2 |
| Texas Tech | 2 |
| UCLA | 1 |
| Virginia Tech | 4 |
| Wake Forest | 1 |
| West Virginia | 3 |
| Wisconsin | 1 |
