= 1983 NC State Wolfpack football team =

American college football season

1983 NC State Wolfpack football
- Conference: Atlantic Coast Conference
- Record: 3–8 (1–5 ACC)
- Head coach: Tom Reed (1st season)
- Home stadium: Carter Stadium

1983 Atlantic Coast Conference football standings
	Conf.					Overall
Team	W		L		T	W		L		T
Maryland $	5	–	0	–	0	8	–	4	–	0
North Carolina	4	–	2	–	0	8	–	4	–	0
Georgia Tech	3	–	2	–	0	3	–	8	–	0
Virginia	3	–	3	–	0	6	–	5	–	0
Duke	3	–	3	–	0	3	–	8	–	0
Wake Forest	1	–	5	–	0	4	–	7	–	0
NC State	1	–	5	–	0	3	–	8	–	0
No. 11 Clemson *	0	–	0	–	0	9	–	1	–	1
$ – Conference champion; * – Clemson was under NCAA and ACC probation and was ineligible for the ACC title. As a result, their ACC games did not count in the league standings.; Rankings from AP Poll

The 1983 NC State Wolfpack football team represented North Carolina State University during the 1983 NCAA Division I-A football season. The team's head coach was Tom Reed. NC State has been a member of the Atlantic Coast Conference (ACC) since the league's inception in 1953. The Wolfpack played its home games in 1983 at Carter–Finley Stadium in Raleigh, North Carolina, which has been NC State football's home stadium since 1966.

== Schedule ==
Date	Opponent	Site	TV	Result	Attendance	Source
September 10	East Carolina*	Carter–Finley Stadium; Raleigh, NC (rivalry)	TBS	L 16–22	57,700	
September 17	The Citadel*	Carter–Finley Stadium; Raleigh, NC		W 45–0	41,300	
September 24	Virginia	Carter–Finley Stadium; Raleigh, NC		L 14–26	44,800	
October 1	at Wake Forest	Groves Stadium; Winston-Salem, NC (rivalry)		W 38–15	28,450	
October 8	Georgia Tech	Carter–Finley Stadium; Raleigh, NC		L 10–20	40,800	
October 15	No. 3 North Carolina	Carter–Finley Stadium; Raleigh, NC (rivalry)		L 14–42	57,800	
October 22	at Clemson*^{A}	Memorial Stadium; Clemson, SC (Textile Bowl)		L 17–27	73,773	
October 29	at South Carolina*	Williams–Brice Stadium; Columbia, SC		L 17–31	69,400	
November 5	Appalachian State*	Carter–Finley Stadium; Raleigh, NC		W 33–7	40,800	
November 10	at Duke	Wallace Wade Stadium; Durham, NC (rivalry)		L 26–27	19,100	
November 19	No. 20 Maryland	Carter–Finley Stadium; Raleigh, NC		L 6–29	32,300	
*Non-conference game; Rankings from AP Poll released prior to the game

Clemson was under NCAA probation, and was ineligible for the ACC title. Therefore, this game did not count in the league standings.
