= 1983 Davidson Wildcats football team =

American college football season

1983 Davidson Wildcats football
- Conference: Southern Conference
- Record: 2–8 (0–5 SoCon)
- Head coach: Ed Farrell (10th season)
- Home stadium: Richardson Stadium

1983 Southern Conference football standings
	Conf.					Overall
Team	W		L		T	W		L		T
No. 2 Furman $^	6	–	0	–	1	10	–	2	–	1
No. 9 Western Carolina ^	5	–	0	–	1	11	–	3	–	1
Chattanooga	5	–	2	–	0	7	–	4	–	0
Appalachian State	4	–	3	–	0	6	–	5	–	0
Marshall	3	–	4	–	0	4	–	7	–	0
VMI	1	–	5	–	0	2	–	9	–	0
The Citadel	1	–	6	–	0	3	–	8	–	0
East Tennessee State	1	–	6	–	0	3	–	8	–	0
Davidson	0	–	2	–	0	2	–	8	–	0
$ – Conference champion; ^ – NCAA Division I-AA playoff participant; Rankings from NCAA Division I-AA Football Committee poll

The 1983 Davidson Wildcats football team represented Davidson College as a member of the Southern Conference during the 1983 NCAA Division I-AA football season. Led by tenth-year head coach Ed Farrell, the Wildcats compiled an overall record of 2–8 with a mark of 0–5 in conference play, placing last out of nine teams in the SoCon. Although not SoCon members, their games against Lafayette, James Madison, and Bucknell were all designated Southern Conference games.

== Schedule ==
Date	Opponent	Site	Result	Attendance	Source
September 10	at Wofford*	Snyder Field; Spartanburg, SC	L 7–21		
September 17	Lafayette	Richardson Stadium; Davidson, NC	L 12–35	2,600	
September 24	at Newberry*	Setzler Field; Newberry, SC	L 7–13	2,500	
October 1	at James Madison	JMU Stadium; Harrisonburg, VA	L 0–50	14,000	
October 8	at Guilford*	Greensboro, NC	W 33–17	2,000	
October 15	South Carolina State*	Richardson Stadium; Davidson, NC	L 7–19	4,600	
October 22	at The Citadel	Johnson Hagood Stadium; Charleston, SC	L 12–41	15,560	
October 29	No. 8 Furman	Richardson Stadium; Davidson, NC	L 7–55	3,800	
November 5	at Bucknell	Memorial Stadium; Lewisburg, PA	L 7–50	1,000	
November 12	Catawba*	Richardson Stadium; Davidson, NC	W 28–21	1,300	
*Non-conference game; Rankings from NCAA Division I-AA Football Committee Poll released prior to the game
