= 1983 Virginia Cavaliers football team =

American college football season

1983 Virginia Cavaliers football
- Conference: Atlantic Coast Conference
- Record: 6–5 (3–3 ACC)
- Head coach: George Welsh (2nd season)
- Captains: Dave Bond; Rich Riccardi; Wayne Schuchts; Billy Smith
- Home stadium: Scott Stadium

1983 Atlantic Coast Conference football standings
	Conf.					Overall
Team	W		L		T	W		L		T
Maryland $	5	–	0	–	0	8	–	4	–	0
North Carolina	4	–	2	–	0	8	–	4	–	0
Georgia Tech	3	–	2	–	0	3	–	8	–	0
Virginia	3	–	3	–	0	6	–	5	–	0
Duke	3	–	3	–	0	3	–	8	–	0
Wake Forest	1	–	5	–	0	4	–	7	–	0
NC State	1	–	5	–	0	3	–	8	–	0
No. 11 Clemson *	0	–	0	–	0	9	–	1	–	1
$ – Conference champion; * – Clemson was under NCAA and ACC probation and was ineligible for the ACC title. As a result, their ACC games did not count in the league standings.; Rankings from AP Poll

The 1983 Virginia Cavaliers football team represented the University of Virginia during the 1983 NCAA Division I-A football season. The Cavaliers were led by second-year head coach George Welsh and played their home games at Scott Stadium in Charlottesville, Virginia. They competed as members of the Atlantic Coast Conference, finishing tied for fourth.

== Schedule ==
Date	Time	Opponent	Site	TV	Result	Attendance	Source
September 3	7:00 p.m.	Duke	Scott Stadium; Charlottesville, VA		W 38–30	28,947	
September 10	7:00 p.m.	Navy*	Scott Stadium; Charlottesville, VA		W 27–16	33,847	
September 17	7:00 p.m.	James Madison*	Scott Stadium; Charlottesville, VA		W 21–14	31,984	
September 24	12:35 p.m.	at NC State	Carter–Finley Stadium; Raleigh, NC	ABC	W 26–14	44,800	
October 1	1:30 p.m.	at No. 19 Maryland	Byrd Stadium; College Park, MD (rivalry)		L 3–23	40,200	
October 8	1:00 p.m.	at Clemson*^{A}	Memorial Stadium; Clemson, SC		L 21–42	78,500	
October 15	7:00 p.m.	VMI*	Scott Stadium; Charlottesville, VA		W 38–10	30,389	
October 22	1:00 p.m.	at Wake Forest	Groves Stadium; Winston-Salem, NC		L 34–38	17,500	
November 3	8:00 p.m.	at Georgia Tech	Grant Field; Atlanta, GA	TBS	L 27–31	22,032	
November 12	1:30 p.m.	No. 19 North Carolina^{†}	Scott Stadium; Charlottesville, VA (South's Oldest Rivalry)		W 17–14	42,933	
November 19	1:00 p.m.	Virginia Tech*	Scott Stadium; Charlottesville, VA (rivalry)		L 0–48	44,572	
*Non-conference game; ^{†}Homecoming; Rankings from AP Poll released prior to the game

A. Clemson was under NCAA probation, and was ineligible for the ACC title. Therefore this game did not count in the league standings.
