= 1968 All-South Independent football team =

American college football season

The 1968 All-South Independent football team consists of American football players chosen by the Associated Press for their All-South independent teams for the 1968 NCAA University Division football season.

== Offense ==
Quarterback

- Bill Cappleman, Florida State

Running back

- Jim Trahan, Tulane

Wide receivers

- Ron Sellers, Florida State
- John Sias, Georgia tech

Tight end

- Joel Stevenson, Georgia Tech

Offensive tackles

- George Hopgood, Miami
- Jack Fenwick, Florida State

Offensive guards

- Ihor Kondrat, Southern Miss
- Larry Mickal, Tulane

Center

- Melvin Autrey, Southern Miss

== Defense ==
Defensive ends

- Ted Hendricks, Miami
- Ernie parker, Tulane

Defensive tackles

- Radell Key, Southern Miss
- John Snell, Tulane

Linebackers

- Dale McCullers, Florida State
- Jerry Pierce, Miami
- Buck Shiver, Georgia Tech

Defensive backs

- John Crowe, Florida State
- Tony Stawarz, Miami
- Billy Kinard, Georgia Tech
