= 1983 North Carolina Tar Heels football team =

American college football season

1983 North Carolina Tar Heels football

Peach Bowl, L 3–28 vs. Florida State
- Conference: Atlantic Coast Conference
- Record: 8–4 (4–2 ACC)
- Head coach: Dick Crum (6th season)
- Captains: Brian Blados; William Fuller
- Home stadium: Kenan Memorial Stadium

1983 Atlantic Coast Conference football standings
	Conf.					Overall
Team	W		L		T	W		L		T
Maryland $	5	–	0	–	0	8	–	4	–	0
North Carolina	4	–	2	–	0	8	–	4	–	0
Georgia Tech	3	–	2	–	0	3	–	8	–	0
Virginia	3	–	3	–	0	6	–	5	–	0
Duke	3	–	3	–	0	3	–	8	–	0
Wake Forest	1	–	5	–	0	4	–	7	–	0
NC State	1	–	5	–	0	3	–	8	–	0
No. 11 Clemson *	0	–	0	–	0	9	–	1	–	1
$ – Conference champion; * – Clemson was under NCAA and ACC probation and was ineligible for the ACC title. As a result, their ACC games did not count in the league standings.; Rankings from AP Poll

The 1983 North Carolina Tar Heels football team represented the University of North Carolina at Chapel Hill during the 1983 NCAA Division I-A football season. The Tar Heels were led by sixth-year head coach Dick Crum and played their home games at Kenan Memorial Stadium in Chapel Hill, North Carolina. They competed as members of the Atlantic Coast Conference, finishing in second.

== Schedule ==
Date	Time	Opponent	Rank	Site	TV	Result	Attendance	Source
September 3	7:00 p.m.	at South Carolina*	No. 11	Williams–Brice Stadium; Columbia, SC (rivalry)		W 24–8	72,400	
September 10	1:00 p.m.	Memphis State*	No. 8	Kenan Memorial Stadium; Chapel Hill, NC		W 24–10	49,000	
September 17	1:00 p.m.	Miami (OH)*	No. 10	Kenan Memorial Stadium; Chapel Hill, NC		W 48–17	49,200	
September 24	1:00 p.m.	William & Mary*	No. 5	Kenan Memorial Stadium; Chapel Hill, NC		W 51–20	49,400	
October 1	1:30 p.m.	at Georgia Tech	No. 5	Grant Field; Atlanta, GA		W 38–21	28,395	
October 8	1:00 p.m.	Wake Forest	No. 4	Kenan Memorial Stadium; Chapel Hill, NC (rivalry)		W 30–10	51,170	
October 15	1:00 p.m.	at NC State	No. 3	Carter–Finley Stadium; Raleigh, NC (rivalry)		W 42–14	57,800	
October 29	3:50 p.m.	at No. 13 Maryland	No. 3	Byrd Stadium; College Park, MD	ABC	L 26–28	51,200	
November 5	1:00 p.m.	Clemson*^{A}	No. 10	Kenan Memorial Stadium; Chapel Hill, NC		L 3–16	53,689	
November 12	1:00 p.m.	at Virginia	No. 19	Scott Stadium; Charlottesville, VA (South's Oldest Rivalry)		L 14–17	42,933	
November 19	3:45 p.m.	Duke		Kenan Memorial Stadium; Chapel Hill, NC (Victory Bell)	CBS	W 34–27	49,500	
December 30	3:00 p.m.	vs. Florida State*		Atlanta–Fulton County Stadium; Atlanta, GA (Peach Bowl)	CBS	L 3–28	25,648	
*Non-conference game; Rankings from AP Poll released prior to the game; All times are in Eastern time

A. Clemson was under NCAA probation and was ineligible for the ACC title. As a result, this game did not count in the league standings.
