= 1983 Marshall Thundering Herd football team =

American college football season

1983 Marshall Thundering Herd football
- Conference: Southern Conference
- Record: 4–7 (3–4 SoCon)
- Head coach: Sonny Randle (5th season)
- Captain: Game captains
- Home stadium: Fairfield Stadium

1983 Southern Conference football standings
| | Conf. | | | | | Overall |
| Team | W | | L | | T | W | | L | | T |
|---|---|---|---|---|---|---|---|---|---|---|
| No. 2 Furman $^ | 6 | – | 0 | – | 1 | 10 | – | 2 | – | 1 |
| No. 9 Western Carolina ^ | 5 | – | 0 | – | 1 | 11 | – | 3 | – | 1 |
| Chattanooga | 5 | – | 2 | – | 0 | 7 | – | 4 | – | 0 |
| Appalachian State | 4 | – | 3 | – | 0 | 6 | – | 5 | – | 0 |
| Marshall | 3 | – | 4 | – | 0 | 4 | – | 7 | – | 0 |
| VMI | 1 | – | 5 | – | 0 | 2 | – | 9 | – | 0 |
| The Citadel | 1 | – | 6 | – | 0 | 3 | – | 8 | – | 0 |
| East Tennessee State | 1 | – | 6 | – | 0 | 3 | – | 8 | – | 0 |
| Davidson | 0 | – | 2 | – | 0 | 2 | – | 8 | – | 0 |
$ – Conference champion; ^ – NCAA Division I-AA playoff participant; Rankings from NCAA Division I-AA Football Committee poll

The 1983 Marshall Thundering Herd football team was an American football team that represented Marshall University in the Southern Conference (SoCon) during the 1983 NCAA Division I-AA football season. In its fifth season under head coach Sonny Randle, the team compiled a 4–7 record (3–4 against conference opponents) and played its home games at Fairfield Stadium in Huntington, West Virginia.

== Schedule ==
| Date | Opponent | Site | Result | Attendance | Source |
|---|---|---|---|---|---|
| September 3 | at Eastern Michigan* | Rynearson Stadium; Ypsilanti, MI | L 3–7 | | |
| September 10 | Illinois State* | Fairfield Stadium; Huntington, WV | L 3–27 | 12,800 | |
| September 17 | at Morehead State* | Jayne Stadium; Morehead, KY | W 35–0 | 9,100 | |
| September 24 | at No. 5 Furman | Paladin Stadium; Greenville, SC | L 7–33 | 8,514 | |
| October 1 | Western Carolina^{†} | Fairfield Stadium; Huntington, WV | L 7–21 | 10,200 | |
| October 8 | East Tennessee State | Fairfield Stadium; Huntington, WV | W 13–10 | 7,889 | |
| October 22 | at Chattanooga | Chamberlain Field; Chattanooga, TN | L 16–23 | 7,122 | |
| October 29 | The Citadel | Fairfield Stadium; Huntington, WV | W 26–10 | 8,788 | |
| November 5 | William & Mary* | Fairfield Stadium; Huntington, WV | L 24–48 | 8,808 | |
| November 12 | at Appalachian State | Conrad Stadium; Boone, NC (rivalry) | L 19–28 | 8,112 | |
| November 19 | VMI | Fairfield Stadium; Huntington, WV | W 56–7 | 6,808 | |
*Non-conference game; ^{†}Homecoming; Rankings from NCAA Division I-AA Football Committee Poll released prior to the game
