= 1969 All-South Independent football team =

American college football season

The 1969 All-South Independent football team consists of American football players chosen by the Associated Press for their All-South independent teams for the 1969 NCAA University Division football season.

== Offense ==
Quarterback

- Bill Cappleman, Florida State

Running backs

- Tom Bailey, Florida State
- Vincent Opalsky, Miami

Wide receivers

- Jim Tyson, Florida State
- Billy Mikel, Southern Miss

Offensive tackles

- Bart Graves-Tulane
- Bob Shepherd, Southern Miss

Offensive guards

- Joe Vitunic-Georgia Tech
- Chip DeWitt-Tulane

Center

- Bill Schneider-Miami

== Defense ==
Defensive ends

- Tony Cline, Miami
- Ron Wallace, Florida State

Defensive tackles

- Rock Perdoni, Georgia Tech
- Mike Walker, Tulane
- Radell Key, Southern Miss

Linebackers

- Rick Kingrea, Tulane
- Bill Lohse, Florida state
- Dick Sorensen, Miami

Defensive backs

- Joe Bullard, Tulane
- Jeff Ford, Georgia tech
