= 1983 Maryland Terrapins football team =

American college football season

1983 Maryland Terrapins football

ACC champion

Florida Citrus Bowl, L 23–30 vs. Tennessee
- Conference: Atlantic Coast Conference
- Record: 8–4 (5–0 ACC)
- Head coach: Bobby Ross (2nd season)
- Offensive coordinator: Ralph Friedgen (2nd season)
- Defensive coordinator: Gib Romaine (2nd season)
- Home stadium: Byrd Stadium

1983 Atlantic Coast Conference football standings
	Conf.					Overall
Team	W		L		T	W		L		T
Maryland $	5	–	0	–	0	8	–	4	–	0
North Carolina	4	–	2	–	0	8	–	4	–	0
Georgia Tech	3	–	2	–	0	3	–	8	–	0
Virginia	3	–	3	–	0	6	–	5	–	0
Duke	3	–	3	–	0	3	–	8	–	0
Wake Forest	1	–	5	–	0	4	–	7	–	0
NC State	1	–	5	–	0	3	–	8	–	0
No. 11 Clemson *	0	–	0	–	0	9	–	1	–	1
$ – Conference champion; * – Clemson was under NCAA and ACC probation and was ineligible for the ACC title. As a result, their ACC games did not count in the league standings.; Rankings from AP Poll

The 1983 Maryland Terrapins football team represented University of Maryland in the 1983 NCAA Division I-A football season. The Terrapins offense scored 316 points while the defense allowed 253 points. Led by head coach Bobby Ross, the Terrapins appeared in the Florida Citrus Bowl.

== Schedule ==
Date	Opponent	Rank	Site	Result	Attendance	Source
September 10	at Vanderbilt*	No. 17	Vanderbilt Stadium; Nashville, TN	W 21–14	40,856	
September 17	No. 20 West Virginia*	No. 17	Byrd Stadium; College Park, MD (rivalry)	L 21–31	54,715	
September 24	No. 17 Pittsburgh*		Byrd Stadium; College Park, MD	W 13–7	48,500	
October 1	Virginia	No. 19	Byrd Stadium; College Park, MD (rivalry)	W 23–13	40,200	
October 8	Syracuse*	No. 16	Byrd Stadium; College Park, MD	W 34–13	43,700	
October 15	at Wake Forest	No. 16	Groves Stadium; Winston-Salem, NC	W 36–33	22,300	
October 22	Duke^{†}	No. 15	Byrd Stadium; College Park, MD	W 38–3	40,100	
October 29	No. 3 North Carolina	No. 13	Byrd Stadium; College Park, MD	W 28–26	51,200	
November 5	at No. 3 Auburn*	No. 7	Jordan-Hare Stadium; Auburn, AL	L 23–35	75,600	
November 12	at No. 17 Clemson*^{A}	No. 11	Memorial Stadium; Clemson, SC	L 27–52	80,615	
November 19	at NC State	No. 20	Carter–Finley Stadium; Raleigh, NC	W 29–6	32,300	
December 17	vs. Tennessee*	No. 16	Florida Citrus Bowl; Orlando, FL (Florida Citrus Bowl)	L 23–30	50,185	
*Non-conference game; ^{†}Homecoming; Rankings from AP Poll released prior to the game

Clemson was under NCAA probation and was ineligible for the ACC title. Therefore, this game did not count in the league standings.

== 1984 NFL draft ==
The following players were selected in the 1984 NFL draft.

Player	Position	Round	Overall	NFL team
Pete Koch	Defensive end	1	16	Cincinnati Bengals
Ron Solt	Guard	1	19	Indianapolis Colts
Boomer Esiason	Quarterback	2	38	Cincinnati Bengals
Dave D'Addio	Running back	4	106	Detroit Lions
Willie Joyner	Running back	7	170	Houston Oilers
Russell Davis	Running back	12	323	Buffalo Bills
