= Tim Harkness (American football) =

American football player and coach (born 1955)

Biographical details
- Born: April 2, 1955; Fort Jackson, South Carolina, U.S.

Playing career
- 1973–1977: Johnson C. Smith
- Positions: Guard, center

Coaching career (HC unless noted)
- 1982: Georgia Tech (GA)
- 1987–1990: Illinois (WR/TE)
- 1991: Tampa Bay Buccaneers (WR)
- 1992: Baylor (RB)
- 1993: South Carolina (assistant)
- 1999–2004: Johnson C. Smith

Head coaching record
- Overall: 10–50

Tim Harkness (born April 2, 1955) is an American football coach and former player. He served as the head football coach at Johnson C. Smith University in Charlotte, North Carolina from 1999 to 2004, compiling a record of 10–50.
