= 1983 Wake Forest Demon Deacons football team =

American college football season

1983 Wake Forest Demon Deacons football
- Conference: Atlantic Coast Conference
- Record: 4–7 (1–5 ACC)
- Head coach: Al Groh (3rd season)
- Offensive coordinator: Ed Zaunbrecher (4th season)
- Captains: Dan Dougherty; Danny Martin; Danny Rocco; Tim Salley; Gary Schofield
- Home stadium: Groves Stadium

1983 Atlantic Coast Conference football standings
	Conf.					Overall
Team	W		L		T	W		L		T
Maryland $	5	–	0	–	0	8	–	4	–	0
North Carolina	4	–	2	–	0	8	–	4	–	0
Georgia Tech	3	–	2	–	0	3	–	8	–	0
Virginia	3	–	3	–	0	6	–	5	–	0
Duke	3	–	3	–	0	3	–	8	–	0
Wake Forest	1	–	5	–	0	4	–	7	–	0
NC State	1	–	5	–	0	3	–	8	–	0
No. 11 Clemson *	0	–	0	–	0	9	–	1	–	1
$ – Conference champion; * – Clemson was under NCAA and ACC probation and was ineligible for the ACC title. As a result, their ACC games did not count in the league standings.; Rankings from AP Poll

The 1983 Wake Forest Demon Deacons football team was an American football team that represented Wake Forest University during the 1983 NCAA Division I-A football season. In their third season under head coach Al Groh, the Demon Deacons compiled a 4–7 record and finished in a tie for last place in the Atlantic Coast Conference, disregarding ACC-sanctioned Clemson.

== Schedule ==
Date	Opponent	Site	Result	Attendance	Source
September 3	Appalachian State*	Groves Stadium; Winston-Salem, NC	L 25–27	25,711	
September 10	at Virginia Tech*	Lane Stadium; Blacksburg, VA	W 13–6	26,300	
September 17	Western Carolina*	Groves Stadium; Winston-Salem, NC	W 21–0	21,351	
September 24	at Richmond*	University of Richmond Stadium; Richmond, VA	W 31–6	6,923	
October 1	NC State	Groves Stadium; Winston-Salem, NC (rivalry)	L 15–38	28,450	
October 8	at No. 4 North Carolina	Kenan Memorial Stadium; Chapel Hill, NC (rivalry)	L 10–30	51,711	
October 15	No. 16 Maryland	Groves Stadium; Winston-Salem, NC	L 33–36	22,300	
October 22	Virginia	Groves Stadium; Winston-Salem, NC	W 38–34	17,500	
October 29	at Clemson*^{A}	Memorial Stadium; Clemson, SC	L 17–24	65,475	
November 5	Duke	Groves Stadium; Winston-Salem, NC (rivalry)	L 21–31	21,400	
November 12	at Georgia Tech	Grant Field; Atlanta, GA	L 33–49	26,330	
*Non-conference game; Rankings from AP Poll released prior to the game

Clemson was under NCAA probation, and was ineligible for the ACC title. Therefore, this game did not count in the league standings.

== Team leaders ==
Category	Team Leader	Att/Cth	Yds
Passing	Gary Schofield	187/333	2,253
Rushing	Michael Ramseur	125	629
Receiving	Duane Owens	46	447
