= Adam Quinn =

American bagpipe player

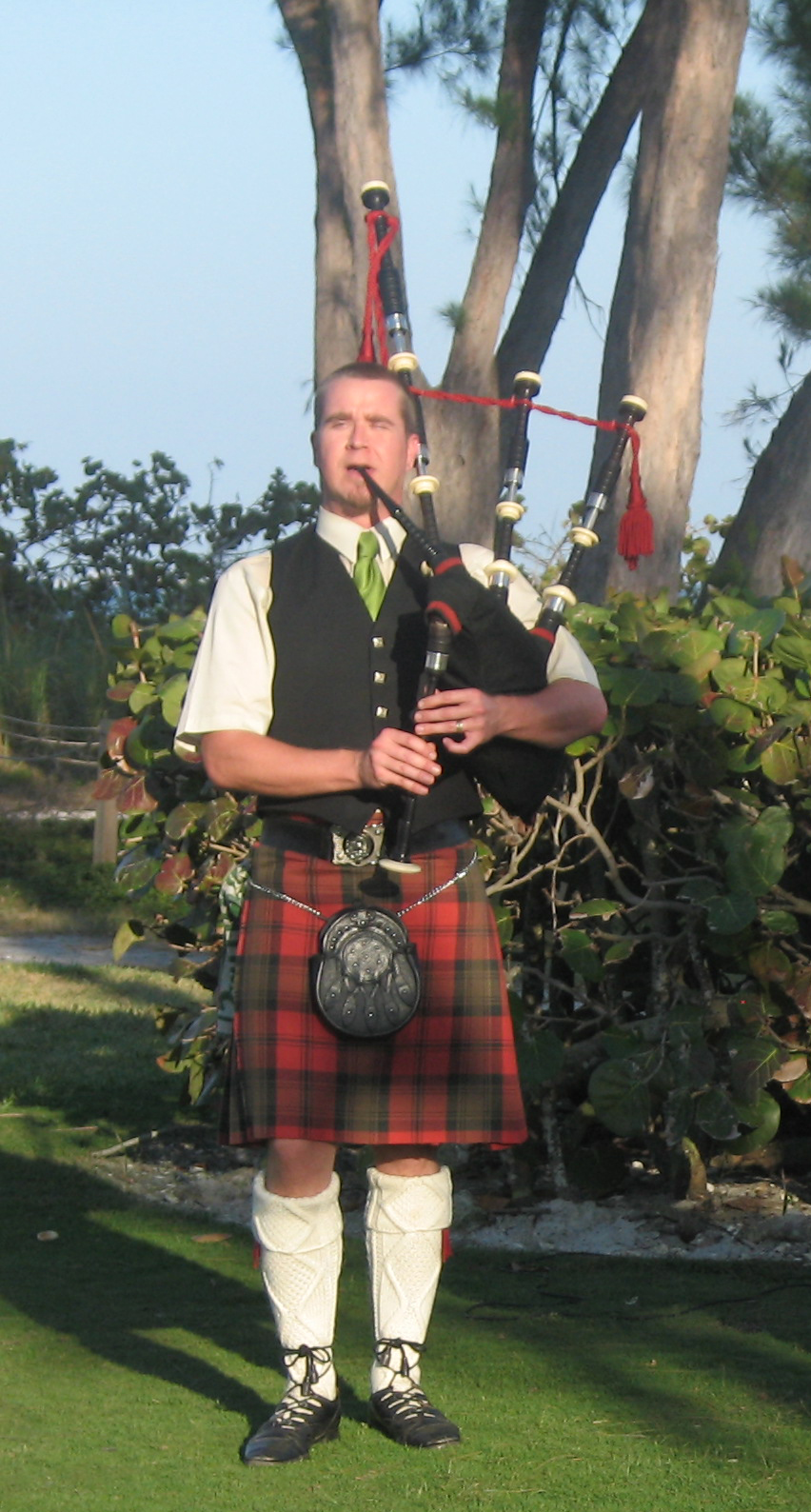
Adam Quinn, composer and bagpiper with the Celtic fusion band, Lucid Druid.

Adam Danger Quinn (born July 14, 1973) is an American bagpipe player, instructor, and composer of bagpipe music, who resides in Clearwater, Florida. He was previously a member of the grade one Simon Fraser University Pipe Band, and is currently the front-man of the Celtic fusion band, Lucid Druid.

== Biography ==
Adam began his musical career with the clarinet at age 9, which he performed through early college years and still features occasionally in Lucid Druid shows. At age 10 he took up the piano, and at age 12 he began to learn the bagpipes under the instruction of Pipe Major Sandy Keith in Dunedin, Florida through the local school system. He quickly excelled at the bagpipes in both solo and band competition, and at 17 was named Pipe Major of the Dunedin High School Scottish Highlanders.

After graduating high school, Quinn enrolled at the University of South Florida in Tampa, FL to major in music performance (clarinet). He took a job at Disney's EPCOT Center in Orlando as a substitute musician in a bagpipe trio, which led to a job at Tokyo Disneyland for the next two years. Returning to the US, he worked as a musician at EPCOT until enrolling at Simon Fraser University in Burnaby, British Columbia in 1995. In 1996 Quinn joined the ranks of the World Champion Simon Fraser University Pipe Band, with whom he won two World Championship titles in 1996 & 1999. For several years Quinn was not only a member of this band, but also a composer, arranger and concert soloist. Much of his work has been featured on SFUPB albums, most notably Live at Carnegie Hall and Down Under: Live at the Sydney Opera House. Additionally, Quinn's music has been performed on the albums of numerous artists and featured in the 2001 World Championship winning medley.

In 2003, Quinn stopped competing with bagpipes on the professional circuit and focused more on composition and the development of his current Celtic fusion band, Lucid Druid. In 2004 he released his first collection of original bagpipe music, The Quinnmusic Collection, and Lucid Druid also released their debut album, Anecdota, which is based around Quinn's original compositions.

In addition to the clarinet, piano and bagpipes, Quinn also plays the didgeridoo, tenor saxophone and African djembe drum.

== Band Affiliations ==
=== As a member ===
- Dunedin Middle School Pipe Band - Grade IV (Florida, USA 1985-1987)
- Dunedin High School Scottish Highlanders - Grade IV & III (Florida, USA 1987-1991)
- City of Dunedin Pipe Band - Grade II (Florida, USA 1991-1995, 2001-2002)
- Simon Fraser University Alumni Pipe Band - Grade II (Canada, 1995-1996)
- Simon Fraser University Pipe Band - Grade I (Canada, 1996-2000)
- University of Ballarat Pipe Band - Grade II (Australia, 1999-2000)
- Lucid Druid - Celtic Fusion band (Florida, USA 2003-present)

=== As an instructor ===
- Rosie O'Grady Highlanders - Grade III (Florida, USA 1995)
- Robert Malcolm Memorial Pipe Band - Grade IV (Canada, 1996 - 1998)
- Northwest MacGregor Pipe Band - Grade IV (Washington, USA 1998 - 2000)
- High Desert Pipes & Drums - Grade IV (New Mexico, USA 1998 - 1999)
- University of Ballarat Pipe Band - Grade II (Australia, 1999-2000)

== Discography ==
=== As a performer ===
- Simon Fraser University Pipe Band: Live at Carnegie Hall
- Anna Schaad & David MacVittie: Songspell
- Lucid Druid: Anecdota

=== As a composer ===
- Simon Fraser University Pipe Band: Live at Carnegie Hall
- Anna Schaad & David MacVittie: Songspell
- Simon Fraser University Pipe Band: Down Under: Live at the Sydney Opera House
- 2001 World Pipe Band Championships
- Simon Fraser University Pipe Band: On Home Ground: Volume One
- Lucid Druid: Anecdota
