= 1983 Clemson Tigers football team =

American college football season

1983 Clemson Tigers football
- Conference: Atlantic Coast Conference

Ranking
- AP: No. 11
- Record: 9–1–1 (0–0 ACC)
- Head coach: Danny Ford (5th full, 6th overall season)
- Offensive coordinator: Nelson Stokley (4th season)
- Captains: James Farr; James Robinson
- Home stadium: Memorial Stadium

1983 Atlantic Coast Conference football standings
	Conf.					Overall
Team	W		L		T	W		L		T
Maryland $	5	–	0	–	0	8	–	4	–	0
North Carolina	4	–	2	–	0	8	–	4	–	0
Georgia Tech	3	–	2	–	0	3	–	8	–	0
Virginia	3	–	3	–	0	6	–	5	–	0
Duke	3	–	3	–	0	3	–	8	–	0
Wake Forest	1	–	5	–	0	4	–	7	–	0
NC State	1	–	5	–	0	3	–	8	–	0
No. 11 Clemson *	0	–	0	–	0	9	–	1	–	1
$ – Conference champion; * – Clemson was under NCAA and ACC probation and was ineligible for the ACC title. As a result, their ACC games did not count in the league standings.; Rankings from AP Poll

The 1983 Clemson Tigers football team was an American football team that represented Clemson University in the Atlantic Coast Conference (ACC) during the 1983 NCAA Division I-A football season. In its sixth season under head coach Danny Ford, the team compiled a 9–1–1 record (7–0 on the field against conference opponents, but officially 0–0 ), was ranked No. 11 in the final AP Poll, and outscored opponents by a total of 338 to 200. The team played its home games at Memorial Stadium in Clemson, South Carolina.

Clemson was on probation for recruiting violations, and was ineligible for the ACC championship and a bowl bid. As a result, their games against ACC opponents, against whom they were an undefeated 7–0 on the field, did not count in the league standings.

James Farr and James Robinson were the team captains. The team's statistical leaders included quarterback Mike Eppley with 1,410 passing yards, fullback Kevin Mack with 862 rushing yards, Ray Williams with 342 receiving yards, and placekicker Bob Paulling with 90 points scored (18 field goals, 36 extra points).

== Schedule ==
Date	Time	Opponent	Rank	Site	Result	Attendance	Source
September 3	1:00 p.m.	Western Carolina*		Memorial Stadium; Clemson, SC	W 44–10	69,962	
September 10	6:00 p.m.	at Boston College*		Alumni Stadium; Chestnut Hill, MA (rivalry)	L 16–31	32,000–32,500	
September 17	1:00 p.m.	No. 11 Georgia*		Memorial Stadium; Clemson, SC (rivalry)	T 16–16	79,815	
September 24	1:00 p.m.	Georgia Tech		Memorial Stadium; Clemson, SC (rivalry)	W 41–14	73,882	
October 8	1:00 p.m.	Virginia^{†}		Memorial Stadium; Clemson, SC	W 42–21	78,376	
October 15	1:30 p.m.	at Duke		Wallace Wade Stadium; Durham, NC	W 38–31	19,300	
October 22	1:00 p.m.	NC State		Memorial Stadium; Clemson, SC (Textile Bowl)	W 27–17	73,773	
October 29	1:00 p.m.	Wake Forest		Memorial Stadium; Clemson, SC	W 24–17	65,475	
November 5	1:00 p.m.	at No. 10 North Carolina		Kenan Memorial Stadium; Chapel Hill, NC	W 16–3	53,689	
November 12	1:00 p.m.	No. 11 Maryland	No. 17	Memorial Stadium; Clemson, SC	W 52–27	80,615	
November 19	1:30 p.m.	at South Carolina*	No. 13	Williams–Brice Stadium; Columbia, SC (rivalry)	W 22–13	74,550	
*Non-conference game; ^{†}Homecoming; Rankings from AP Poll released prior to the game; All times are in Eastern time

== Roster ==
1983 Clemson Tigers football team roster
Players
Coaches
Offense

Pos.	#	Name	Class
TE		K. D. Dunn	Jr
QB	10	Mike Eppley	Jr
RB	27	Kevin Mack	Sr

Defense

Pos.	#	Name	Class
LB	24	Billy Davis	Sr
DB		Tyrone Davis	Jr
DT	66	William Perry	Jr
DB		Reggie Pleasant	Jr
CB	28	Rod McSwain	Sr

Special teams

Pos.	#	Name	Class
P	5	Dale Hatcher	Jr
K	8	Donald Igwebuike	Jr

Head coach

- Danny Ford

Coordinators/assistant coaches

Legend

- (C) Team captain
- (S) Suspended
- (I) Ineligible
- Injured
- Redshirt
