= Lucid Druid =

- Origin: Clearwater, Florida, United States
- Genres: Celtic fusion
- Years active: 2003–present
- Labels: Giving Tree Music
- Website: LucidDruid.com

Lucid Druid is a Celtic fusion band that formed in Clearwater, Florida in 2003. The band self-proclaims their sound as "Traditional Celtic Music of the early 21st century," and "Eclectic World-Fusion Music," describing their multi-faceted and jam-induced music.

Highlighting the original compositions of two-time World Champion bagpiper Adam Quinn (formerly of the Simon Fraser University Pipe Band), the band is composed of 5 core members who integrate the sounds of bagpipes, guitar, double bass, didgeridoo & Scottish snare with a variety of African drums to create a unique sound. The music of Lucid Druid fuses the qualities of traditional & modern Scottish music with elements of rock, jazz, country, and traditional African rhythms. Their unusual arrangements and exploratory jams make their music un-comparable to anything else being produced today in the genre of Celtic fusion music.

The band still maintains their original lineup which consists of the following members:

- Adam Quinn - Bagpipes, Degerpipes, Shuttlepipes, Didgeridoo, Clarinet
- Steve Turner - Ashiko, Djembe, Drum Set, Didgeridoo
- Joe Porter - Double Bass, Electric Bass
- Doug White - Scottish Snare, Drum Set, Roto-Tams, Bongos
- Sebastian Deledda - Guitars

== Discography ==
- Anecdota (2004)
