= 1983 Peach Bowl =

- 16th Peach Bowl
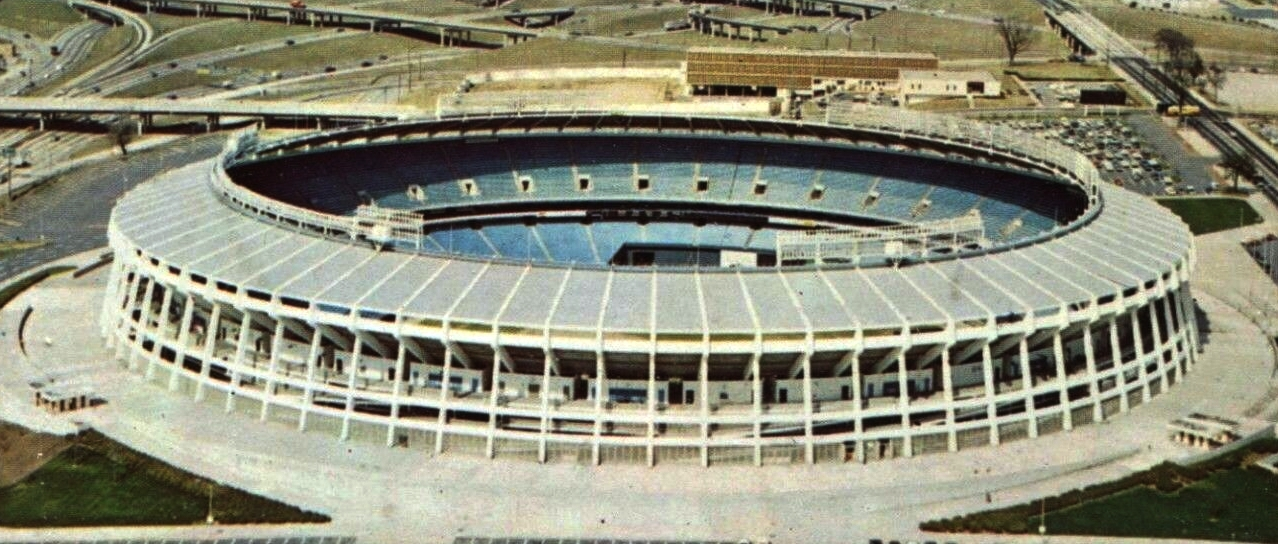
- Atlanta–Fulton County Stadium in Atlanta, Georgia, hosted the Peach Bowl.
North Carolina Tar Heels	Florida State Seminoles
(8–3)	(7–4)
ACC	Independent
3	28
Head coach: Dick Crum	Head coach: Bobby Bowden
	1	2	3	4	Total
North Carolina	0	0	0	3	3
Florida State	14	7	0	7	28
- Date: December 30, 1983
- Season: 1983
- Stadium: Atlanta–Fulton County Stadium
- Location: Atlanta, Georgia
- MVP: Eric Thomas
- Referee: Dr. Larry Glass (MAC)
- Attendance: 25,648

United States TV coverage
- Network: CBS
- Announcers: Verne Lundquist and Steve Davis

The 1983 Peach Bowl featured the North Carolina Tar Heels of the Atlantic Coast Conference against the then-independent Florida State Seminoles

== Game summary ==
Making his first collegiate start ever, quarterback Eric Thomas connected on a pair of first-quarter touchdown passes to Weegie Thompson as Florida State defeated North Carolina 28–3, in the 16th annual Peach Bowl Classic.

Thomas, who played sparingly throughout the year after missing of 1982 with a shoulder injury, led FSU to a 14–0 lead on its first two possessions. Taking over on the FSU 38, Thomas directed a nine-play 62-yard march that ended on a 15 -yard pass to Thompson in the left corner of the end zone for the score. Philip Hall added the extra point and FSU led 7–0.

On the next possession, Thomas displayed some veteran composure, eluding a strong North Carolina blitz to hit Thompson on an 18-yard to cap a 54-yard, five play drive.

Florida State's much maligned defense shut out the Tar Heels for the entire half; while Pete Panton set up a one-yard touchdown run by Rosie Snipes by recovering a fumbled punt return on the North Carolina 16 midway through the second quarter as the Seminoles took a 21–0 lead into the locker room.

After holding North Carolina to 30 net yards in the third quarter, FSU's defense allowed North Carolina its only points of the game early in the fourth quarter on a 36-yard Brooks Barwick field goal.

North Carolina drove down to the FSU 12 on its next possession, but the Seminole defense forced four straight incomplete passes to take over on downs.

Thomas and company took over, running all but 31 seconds off the game clock as Thomas capped and 88-yard drive with a 1-yard touchdown run and the Seminoles had their biggest winning margin ever in a bowl game.

Thomas completed seven of 13 passes for 99 yards and added 41 yards rushing to lead the Seminoles offensively as he earned MVP honors for the game All-American Greg Allen paced a 265-yard rushing attack with 97 yards on 17 carries.

Alphonso Carreker earned defensive MVP honors for the Seminoles. Carreker, who had six tackles broke up a pass and sacked NC quarterback Scott Stankavage once, spearheaded a defensive effort that allowed Carolina just 32 yards rushing in the game.

== Game statistics ==
	NC	FSU
First downs	16	23
Rushing yards	26–32	59–265
Passing	40–18–0	13–7–1
Passing yards	166	99
Total offense	66–198	72–364
Fumbles lost	4–1	3–0
Punts–average	6–45.2	6–38.8
Penalties	7–60	6–34
