= Bob Waters Field at E. J. Whitmire Stadium =

Football stadium in Cullowhee, North Carolina

- Interactive map of Bob Waters Field at E. J. Whitmire Stadium
- Location: 291 Catamount Road; Cullowhee, NC 28723
- Coordinates: 35°18′17″N 83°10′57″W
- Owner: Western Carolina University
- Operator: Western Carolina University
- Capacity: 13,742 (2003–present); 12,000 (1974–2002)
- Surface: Desso Challenge Pro 2 turf

Construction
- Groundbreaking: 1973
- Opened: September 14, 1974
- Cost: $1.66 million ($10.8 million in 2025 dollars)
- Architects: Moore and Robinson Architects

Tenant
- Western Carolina Catamounts (NCAA) (1974–present)

Bob Waters Field at E. J. Whitmire Stadium is a 13,742-seat football stadium in Cullowhee, North Carolina. It opened in 1974 and is home to the Western Carolina University Catamounts football team. The field itself is named Bob Waters Field. The football facility is located on the south end of the WCU campus and is bordered by Cullowhee Creek on the west side; Jordan-Phillips Field House and WCU Weight Room on its north end, and the Liston B. Ramsey Regional Activity Center on the south end.

== History ==
In 1971, the North Carolina General Assembly granted $1.66 million ($8.7 million in 2020 dollars) to the school for construction of a new football facility to replace Memorial Stadium, which was built in 1949. The first game at the new Whitmire Stadium was against Murray State on September 14, 1974 which was attended by 7,500 fans.

=== Renovations ===
Turf: AstroTurf was first installed in 1974. In 2000, the turf was replaced with AstroPlay at a cost of $1.2 million. After the 2008 season, the artificial surface was replaced with the Desso Challenge Pro 2 turf. After the 2019 season, the turf was replaced again, this time with IronTurf. The project also included resurfacing the perimeter immediately around the field and the addition of a new synthetic turf sled and practice area referred to as the "Hog Pit."

Prior to the 2003 season, more facility improvements and upgrades to the stadium were completed. A $3.1 million addition featured a 4,000-seat West Side grandstand seating area that included concessions and restroom facilities as well as new, updated lighting. The weight room in the Jordan-Phillips Field House was expanded, nearly doubling its previous capacity which also added a hospitality patio that overlooks the stadium on the north end zone. It also includes additional team meeting space, computer lab and visiting team locker room. In 2018, the state-of-the-art David & Marie Brinkley Weight Lifting Facility was opened after a $400,000 facelift to the weight room for WCU's student-athletes.

During the off-season prior to the 2010 campaign, a new Daktronics scoreboard with video screen was installed in the south end zone of the facility. The state-of-the-art video screen measures 17 feet (5.2 m) tall by 32 feet (9.8 m) wide and includes a scoreboard with a matching score and time board adhered to the facade of the Jordan-Phillips Field House.

== Stadium benefactors ==
E. J. Whitmire, a Franklin native, was on the WCU Board of Trustees from 1949 to 1972 and was the driving force behind the large growth of the university in that time. He was inducted into the WCU Athletics Hall of Fame in 1993.

In 1988, the field at Whitmire Stadium was dedicated to Coach Bob Waters. Dedicated for his work as WCU's most successful football coach and his role as athletic director for bringing the Catamounts from NAIA to NCAA Division I, Waters was posthumously inducted into the WCU Athletics Hall of Fame in 1993.

== See also ==
- List of NCAA Division I FCS football stadiums
