= Dennis Raetz =

American football player and coach (born 1946)

Biographical details
- Born: May 20, 1946 (age 80); North Platte, Nebraska, U.S.
- Education: Nebraska

Playing career
- 1965–1966: Nebraska
- Position: Offensive lineman

Coaching career (HC unless noted)
- 1968–1972: North Kansas City HS (MO) (assistant)
- 1973–1976: J. C. Harmon HS (KS)
- 1977: Missouri (assistant)
- 1978–1979: Indiana State (DC)
- 1980–1997: Indiana State
- 2007: Indiana State (interim HC)

Head coaching record
- Overall: 93–111–1 (college)
- Tournaments: 1–2 (NCAA D-I-AA playoffs)

Accomplishments and honors

Awards
- MVC Coach of the Year (1984)

Dennis Raetz (born May 20, 1946) is an American former college football coach. He served as the head football coach at Indiana State University from 1980 to 1997 and returned as interim head coach for part of the 2007 season. Raetz was the defensive coordinator at Indiana State in 1978 and 1979. He is the leader at Indiana State in tenure (18 full seasons), wins (93) and playoff appearances (2). Raetz also served as a scout for the Edmonton Eskimos of the Canadian Football League (CFL) from 2003 to 2005, when the franchise won two Grey Cup championships.

== Coaching career ==
Raetz began a coaching career that took him from North Kansas City High, where his teams were renowned for their defensive prowess, to a head coaching position at the J.C Harmon High; where he coached future NFL Pro Bowler Mark Haynes. He left there to join the staff at the University of Missouri.

Prior to joining the Sycamores staff, Raetz was an assistant coach at the University of Missouri during the 1977 season; developing a professional partnership with Dick Jamieson that would lead to Terre Haute, Indiana and the Indiana State Sycamores. Joining Dick Jamieson as the defensive coordinator and linebackers coach at Indiana State, when Jamieson was tapped as the 14th head coach in Indiana State history; two seasons later, when Jamieson was hired onto the staff of the NFL's St. Louis Cardinals, Raetz succeeded him as the 15th coach for the Sycamores.

Raetz two best seasons at Indiana State were 1983 and 1984, when he led the Sycamores to consecutive playoff appearances. In 1983, Indiana State advanced to the quarterfinals of the NCAA Division I-AA playoffs before losing to conference foe, Southern Illinois. The Sycamores took the momentum gained from 1983 season and ran off nine straight victories to open the 1984 season; they achieved the top spot in the nation with a No. 1 ranking. The 1984 season came to an end in the NCAA Division I-AA quarterfinals when the Sycamores dropped a 42–41 overtime decision to Middle Tennessee. Raetz led the Sycamores to two of the program's three nine-win seasons.

Raetz coached eight First Team All-Americans; 65 All-Missouri Valley/Missouri Valley Football players, 6 Collegiate All-Star players, 8 Conference Players of the Year, and sent 14 players to the professional ranks; most notably:

- Tunch Ilkin, a two-time Pro Bowl offensive tackle with the Steelers; he finished his career with the Packers.
- Wayne Davis, a cornerback with the Chargers, Bills and Redskins.
- Vencie Glenn, the safety who played for the Patriots, Chargers, Saints, Vikings and Giants.
- Mike Simmonds, an offensive lineman who played for the Tampa Bay Buccaneers.

Among the assistant coaches who worked for Raetz and went on to become an NFL head coach, assistant coach or player personnel positions were Sean Payton (New Orleans Saints), Dave McGinnis (Arizona Cardinals), (Tennessee Titans), Pete Hoener (San Francisco 49ers), Bobby Turner (Washington Redskins), Dave Magazu (Carolina Panthers) and Alvin Reynolds (Baltimore Ravens), (Atlanta Falcons).

== Head coaching record ==
=== College ===
Year	Team	Overall	Conference	Standing	Bowl/playoffs	NCAA/TSN^{#}
Indiana State Sycamores (Missouri Valley Conference) (1980–1986)
1980	Indiana State	6–5	4–2	3rd		
1981	Indiana State	5–5–1	3–2	6th		
1982	Indiana State	5–6	3–2	4th		
1983	Indiana State	9–4	3–2	T–3rd	L NCAA Division I-AA Quarterfinal	5
1984	Indiana State	9–3	4–1	2nd	L NCAA Division I-AA Quarterfinal	5
1985	Indiana State	4–6	3–2	4th		
Indiana State Sycamores (Gateway Football Conference) (1986–1997)
1986	Indiana State	3–8	1–5	6th		
1987	Indiana State	5–6	2–4	5th		
1988	Indiana State	5–6	4–2	T–2nd		
1989	Indiana State	4–7	2–4	5th		
1990	Indiana State	4–7	1–5	T–6th		
1991	Indiana State	5–6	2–4	T–5th		
1992	Indiana State	4–7	2–4	T–4th		
1993	Indiana State	4–7	2–4	6th		
1994	Indiana State	5–6	2–4	T–5th		
1995	Indiana State	7–4	3–3	T–3rd		24
1996	Indiana State	6–5	3–2	T–2nd		
1997	Indiana State	3–8	2–4	5th		
Indiana State Sycamores (Gateway Football Conference) (2007)
2007	Indiana State	0–7 (Note: Lou West served as the head football coach for the first four games of the 2007 season before he was fired. Raetz was appointed as interim head coach and led Indiana State for the final seven games of the season. The Sycamores finished 0–11 overall and 0–6 in conference play.)	0–5	7th		
Indiana State:		93–111–1	46–61			
Total:		93–111–1				
