= 1983 Utah Utes football team =

American college football season

1983 Utah Utes football
- Conference: Western Athletic Conference
- Record: 5–6 (4–4 WAC)
- Head coach: Chuck Stobart (2nd season)
- Offensive coordinator: John Faiman (1st season)
- Defensive coordinator: Steve Hallsey (1st season)
- Home stadium: Robert Rice Stadium

1983 Western Athletic Conference football standings
	Conf.					Overall
Team	W		L		T	W		L		T
No. 7 BYU $	7	–	0	–	0	11	–	1	–	0
No. 13 Air Force	5	–	2	–	0	10	–	2	–	0
Wyoming	5	–	3	–	0	7	–	5	–	0
New Mexico	4	–	3	–	0	6	–	6	–	0
Hawaii	3	–	3	–	1	5	–	5	–	1
Utah	4	–	4	–	0	5	–	6	–	0
Colorado State	4	–	4	–	0	5	–	7	–	0
San Diego State	1	–	6	–	1	2	–	9	–	1
UTEP	0	–	8	–	0	2	–	10	–	0
$ – Conference champion; Rankings from AP Poll

The 1983 Utah Utes football team was an American football team that represented the University of Utah as a member of the Western Athletic Conference (WAC) during the 1983 NCAA Division I-A football season. In their second season under head coach Chuck Stobart, the Utes compiled an overall record of 5–6 with a mark of 4–4 against conference opponents, placing in a three-way tie for fifth in the WAC. Home games were played on campus at Robert Rice Stadium in Salt Lake City.

== Schedule ==
Date	Time	Opponent	Site	TV	Result	Attendance	Source
September 3	7:00 pm	at New Mexico	University Stadium; Albuquerque, NM		L 7–17	29,161	
September 10	6:00 pm	at No. 11 Arizona*	Arizona Stadium; Tucson, AZ		L 0–38	44,904	
September 17	7:30 pm	San Diego State	Robert Rice Stadium; Salt Lake City, UT		W 27–24	26,712	
September 24	7:30 pm	Hawaii	Robert Rice Stadium; Salt Lake City, UT		W 28–25	30,258	
October 1	1:30 pm	at Colorado State	Hughes Stadium; Fort Collins, CO		L 28–31	18,312	
October 8	7:30 pm	UTEP	Robert Rice Stadium; Salt Lake City, UT		W 35–11	25,203	
October 15	1:30 pm	Wyoming	Robert Rice Stadium; Salt Lake City, UT	CBS	W 69–14	19,121	
October 22	1:30 pm	at Air Force	Falcon Stadium; Colorado Springs, CO		L 31–33	23,248	
November 5	1:30 pm	Cal State Fullerton*^{†}	Robert Rice Stadium; Salt Lake City, UT		W 47–20	26,131	
November 12	1:30 pm	at Utah State*	Romney Stadium; Logan, UT (Battle of the Brothers)		L 17–21	19,301	
November 19	1:30 pm	at No. 9 BYU	Cougar Stadium; Provo, UT (Holy War)		L 7–55	65,215	
*Non-conference game; ^{†}Homecoming; Rankings from AP Poll released prior to the game; All times are in Mountain time

== Roster ==
1983 Utah Utes football team roster
Players
Coaches
Offense

Pos.	#	Name	Class
QB	7	Eric Erickson	Fr
TE	83	Len Hollandsworth	Sr
TE	82	Andy Parker	Sr
QB	12	Mark Stevens	Jr

Defense

Pos.	#	Name	Class
LB	46	Filipo Mokofis	So

Special teams

Pos.	#	Name	Class

Head coach

- Chuck Stobart

Coordinators/assistant coaches

Legend

- (C) Team captain
- (S) Suspended
- (I) Ineligible
- Injured
- Redshirt

== NFL draft ==
One Utah player was selected in the 1984 NFL draft.

Player	Position	Round	Pick	NFL team
Andy Parker	Tight end	5	127	Los Angeles Raiders
