= 1983 Indiana State Sycamores football team =

American college football season

1983 Indiana State Sycamores football

NCAA Division I-AA Quarterfinal, L 7–23 vs. Southern Illinois
- Conference: Missouri Valley Conference
- Record: 9–4 (3–2 MVC)
- Head coach: Dennis Raetz (4th season)
- Offensive coordinator: Pete Hoener (4th season)
- Defensive coordinator: Tim McGuire (1st season)
- Home stadium: Memorial Stadium

1983 Missouri Valley Conference football standings
	Conf.					Overall
Team	W		L		T	W		L		T
Tulsa $	5	–	0	–	0	8	–	3	–	0
No. 1 Southern Illinois ^	4	–	1	–	0	13	–	1	–	0
No. 5 Indiana State ^	3	–	2	–	0	9	–	4	–	0
New Mexico State	3	–	2	–	0	5	–	6	–	0
Illinois State	2	–	2	–	1	6	–	4	–	1
Wichita State	3	–	3	–	0	3	–	8	–	0
Drake	1	–	6	–	0	1	–	10	–	0
West Texas State	0	–	5	–	1	0	–	10	–	1
$ – Conference champion; ^ – NCAA Division I-AA playoff participant; The conference was a hybrid of NCAA Division I-A and I-AA programs. New Mexico State, Tulsa, and Wichita State were I-A and the other teams were I-AA.; Rankings from NCAA Division I-AA Football Committee poll

The 1983 Indiana State Sycamores football team represented Indiana State University as a member of the Missouri Valley Conference (MVC) during the 1983 NCAA Division I-AA football season. The Sycamores were led by fourth-year head coach Dennis Raetz and played their home games at Memorial Stadium. Indiana State finished the season 8–3 overall and 3–2 in MVC play to tie for third place. They were invited to the NCAA I-AA playoffs, where they defeated Eastern Illinois (16–13 in double overtime) in the first round before losing (23–7) in the quarterfinals to eventual national champion Southern Illinois.

The roster included such standout performers as cornerback Wayne Davis and free safety Vencie Glenn, who went on to long successful NFL careers. Mike Simmonds, Jeff Miller was selected Honorable Mention All-American, future college head coach Trent Miles was a wide receiver.

== Schedule ==
Date	Opponent	Rank	Site	Result	Attendance	Source
September 3	No. 13 Northeast Louisiana*		Memorial Stadium; Terre Haute, IN	W 10–9	8,131	
September 10	Northern Iowa*		Memorial Stadium; Terre Haute, IN	W 26–0	8,914	
September 17	at No. 15 (I-A) Florida*		Florida Field; Gainesville, FL	L 13–17	68,191	
September 24	Central Missouri State*	No. 10	Memorial Stadium; Terre Haute, IN	W 33–7	11,482	
October 1	at Illinois State	No. 7	Hancock Stadium; Normal, IL	L 20–37	14,503	
October 8	Ball State*	No. 18	Memorial Stadium; Terre Haute, IN (rivalry)	W 35–14	9,219	
October 15	Wichita State	No. 16	Memorial Stadium; Terre Haute, IN	W 24–22	8,782	
October 22	No. 2 Southern Illinois^{†}	No. 14	Memorial Stadium; Terre Haute, IN	L 21–34	14,111	
October 29	at No. 7 Eastern Illinois*	No. 20	O’Brien Stadium; Charleston, IL	W 17–13	3,300	
November 5	at West Texas State	No. 15	Kimbrough Memorial Stadium; Canyon, TX	W 31–20	2,516	
November 12	at Drake	No. 9	Drake Stadium; Des Moines, IA	W 38–0	900	
November 26	No. 6 Eastern Illinois*	No. 5	Memorial Stadium; Terre Haute, IN (NCAA Division I-AA First Round)	W 16–13 ^{2OT}	6,222	
December 3	at No. 1 Southern Illinois*	No. 5	McAndrew Stadium; Carbondale, IL (NCAA Division I-AA Quarterfinal)	L 7–23	8,000	
*Non-conference game; ^{†}Homecoming; Rankings from NCAA Division I-AA Football Committee Poll released prior to the game
