= 1983 Eastern Illinois Panthers football team =

American college football season

1983 Eastern Illinois Panthers football

Mid-Con champion

NCAA Division I-AA First Round, L 13–16 ^{2OT} vs. Indiana State
- Conference: Association of Mid-Continent Universities
- Record: 9–3 (3–0 Mid-Con)
- Head coach: Al Molde (1st season)
- Home stadium: O'Brien Stadium

1983 Association of Mid-Continent Universities football standings
	Conf.					Overall
Team	W		L		T	W		L		T
No. 6 Eastern Illinois $^	3	–	0	–	0	9	–	3	–	0
Southwest Missouri State	2	–	1	–	0	6	–	5	–	0
Northern Iowa	1	–	2	–	0	6	–	5	–	0
Western Illinois	0	–	3	–	0	3	–	8	–	0
$ – Conference champion; ^ – NCAA Division I-AA playoff participant; Rankings from NCAA Division I-AA Football Committee poll

The 1983 Eastern Illinois Panthers football team was an American football team that represented Eastern Illinois University as a member of the Association of Mid-Continent Universities (Mid-Con) during the 1983 NCAA Division I-AA football season. Led by first-year head coach Al Molde, the Panthers compiled an overall record of 9–3 with a mark of 3–0 in conference play, winning the Mid-Con title. Eastern Illinois was invited to the NCAA Division I-AA Football Championship playoffs, where they lost Indiana State in the first round.

== Schedule ==
Date	Opponent	Rank	Site	Result	Attendance	Source
September 3	at Illinois State*		Hancock Stadium; Normal, IL (rivalry)	W 38–7		
September 10	at Southern Illinois*		McAndrew Stadium; Carbondale, IL	L 14–17	12,800	
September 17	Grand Valley State*		O'Brien Stadium; Charleston, IL	W 35–21	6,400	
September 24	at Northeast Missouri State*		Stokes Stadium; Kirksville, MO	W 42–0		
October 1	Youngstown State*		O'Brien Stadium; Charleston, IL	W 21–20		
October 8	at Akron*	No. T–19	Rubber Bowl; Akron, OH	W 10–7		
October 15	Northern Iowa	No. 14	O'Brien Stadium; Charleston, IL	W 13–0	7,100	
October 22	Western Illinois	No. T–9	O'Brien Stadium; Charleston, IL	W 20–0		
October 29	No. 20 Indiana State*	No. 7	O'Brien Stadium; Charleston, IL	L 13–17	3,300	
November 5	Southwest Missouri State	No. 13	O'Brien Stadium; Charleston, IL	W 12–3		
November 12	at Western Kentucky*	No. 11	Houchens Industries–L. T. Smith Stadium; Bowling Green, KY	W 34–14	5,000	
November 26	at No. 5 Indiana State*	No. 6	Memorial Stadium; Terre Haute, IN (NCAA Division I-AA First Round)	L 13–16 ^{2OT}	6,222	
*Non-conference game; Rankings from NCAA Division I-AA Football Committee Poll released prior to the game

== Roster ==
1983 Eastern Illinois Panthers football team roster
Players
Coaches
Offense

Pos.	#	Name	Class
WR	84	Roy Banks	Fr
QB	18	Sean Payton	So
QB	13	Tom Peterson	Jr

Defense

Pos.	#	Name	Class
CB	4	Reggie Drew	Jr
LB	52	Rob DeVita	Fr
S	28	Robert Williams	Sr

Special teams

Pos.	#	Name	Class

Head coach

- Al Molde

Coordinators/assistant coaches

Legend

- (C) Team captain
- (S) Suspended
- (I) Ineligible
- Injured
- Redshirt
