= 1983 Illinois State Redbirds football team =

American college football season

1983 Illinois State Redbirds football
- Conference: Missouri Valley Conference
- Record: 6–4–1 (2–2–1 MVC)
- Head coach: Bob Otolski (3rd season)
- Home stadium: Hancock Stadium

1983 Missouri Valley Conference football standings
	Conf.					Overall
Team	W		L		T	W		L		T
Tulsa $	5	–	0	–	0	8	–	3	–	0
No. 1 Southern Illinois ^	4	–	1	–	0	13	–	1	–	0
No. 5 Indiana State ^	3	–	2	–	0	9	–	4	–	0
New Mexico State	3	–	2	–	0	5	–	6	–	0
Illinois State	2	–	2	–	1	6	–	4	–	1
Wichita State	3	–	3	–	0	3	–	8	–	0
Drake	1	–	6	–	0	1	–	10	–	0
West Texas State	0	–	5	–	1	0	–	10	–	1
$ – Conference champion; ^ – NCAA Division I-AA playoff participant; The conference was a hybrid of NCAA Division I-A and I-AA programs. New Mexico State, Tulsa, and Wichita State were I-A and the other teams were I-AA.; Rankings from NCAA Division I-AA Football Committee poll

The 1983 Illinois State Redbirds football team was an American football team that represented Illinois State University as a member of the Missouri Valley Conference (MVC) during the 1983 NCAA Division I-AA football season. In their third year under head coach Bob Otolski, the Redbirds compiled an overall record of 6–4–1 with a mark of 2–2–1 in conference play, placing fifth out of eight teams in the MVC. Illinois State played home games at Hancock Stadium in Normal, Illinois.

== Schedule ==
Date	Opponent	Site	Result	Attendance	Source
September 3	Eastern Illinois*	Hancock Stadium; Normal, IL (rivalry)	L 7–38		
September 10	at Marshall*	Fairfield Stadium; Huntington, WV	W 27–3	12,800	
September 17	Western Michigan*	Hancock Stadium; Normal, IL	L 14–41		
September 24	at Drake	Drake Stadium; Des Moines, IN	W 36–17		
October 1	No. 7 Indiana State	Hancock Stadium; Normal, IL	W 37–20	14,503	
October 8	at West Texas State	Kimbrough Memorial Stadium; Canyon, TX	T 24–24		
October 15	at Tulsa	Skelly Stadium; Tulsa, OK	L 25–39	21,107	
October 22	at Nicholls State*	John L. Guidry Stadium; Thibodaux, LA	W 34–29		
October 29	Western Illinois*^{†}	Hancock Stadium; Normal, IL	W 45–7	9,096	
November 5	at No. 1 Southern Illinois	McAndrew Stadium; Carbondale, IL	L 26–28	16,600	
November 12	Southwest Missouri State*	Hancock Stadium; Normal, IL	W 34–7	6,101	
*Non-conference game; ^{†}Homecoming; Rankings from NCAA Division I-AA Football Committee Poll released prior to the game
