= 1983 New Mexico State Aggies football team =

American college football season

1983 New Mexico State Aggies football
- Conference: Missouri Valley Conference
- Record: 5–6 (3–2 MVC)
- Head coach: Fred Zechman (1st season)
- Home stadium: Aggie Memorial Stadium

1983 Missouri Valley Conference football standings
	Conf.					Overall
Team	W		L		T	W		L		T
Tulsa $	5	–	0	–	0	8	–	3	–	0
No. 1 Southern Illinois ^	4	–	1	–	0	13	–	1	–	0
No. 5 Indiana State ^	3	–	2	–	0	9	–	4	–	0
New Mexico State	3	–	2	–	0	5	–	6	–	0
Illinois State	2	–	2	–	1	6	–	4	–	1
Wichita State	3	–	3	–	0	3	–	8	–	0
Drake	1	–	6	–	0	1	–	10	–	0
West Texas State	0	–	5	–	1	0	–	10	–	1
$ – Conference champion; ^ – NCAA Division I-AA playoff participant; The conference was a hybrid of NCAA Division I-A and I-AA programs. New Mexico State, Tulsa, and Wichita State were I-A and the other teams were I-AA.; Rankings from NCAA Division I-AA Football Committee poll

The 1983 New Mexico State Aggies football team was an American football team that represented New Mexico State University in the Missouri Valley Conference during the 1983 NCAA Division I-A football season. In their first year under head coach Fred Zechman, the Aggies compiled a 5–6 record. The team played its home games at Aggie Memorial Stadium in Las Cruces, New Mexico.

== Schedule ==
Date	Opponent	Site	Result	Attendance	Source
September 3	at UTEP*	Sun Bowl; El Paso, TX (rivalry)	L 9–20	35,211	
September 10	Louisiana Tech*	Aggie Memorial Stadium; Las Cruces, NM	W 15–7	15,302	
September 17	at North Texas State*	Fouts Field; Denton, TX	L 3–49		
September 24	New Mexico*	Aggie Memorial Stadium; Las Cruces, NM (rivalry)	L 10–31		
October 1	at Iowa State*	Cyclone Stadium; Ames, IA	W 24–17	47,703	
October 8	at Tulsa	Skelly Stadium; Tulsa, OK	L 10–24	16,098	
October 15	Drake	Aggie Memorial Stadium; Las Cruces, NM	W 42–23		
October 22	at UT Arlington*	Maverick Stadium; Arlington, TX	L 7–28	4,271	
October 29	at Southern Illinois	McAndrew Stadium; Carbondale, IL	L 3–41	14,000	
November 5	Wichita State	Aggie Memorial Stadium; Las Cruces, NM	W 62–28	21,847	
November 19	West Texas State	Aggie Memorial Stadium; Las Cruces, NM	W 26–24		
*Non-conference game
