= 1983 Drake Bulldogs football team =

American college football season

1983 Drake Bulldogs football
- Conference: Missouri Valley Conference
- Record: 1–10 (1–6 MVC)
- Head coach: Chuck Shelton (7th season)
- Home stadium: Drake Stadium

1983 Missouri Valley Conference football standings
| | Conf. | | | | | Overall |
| Team | W | | L | | T | W | | L | | T |
|---|---|---|---|---|---|---|---|---|---|---|
| Tulsa $ | 5 | – | 0 | – | 0 | 8 | – | 3 | – | 0 |
| No. 1 Southern Illinois ^ | 4 | – | 1 | – | 0 | 13 | – | 1 | – | 0 |
| No. 5 Indiana State ^ | 3 | – | 2 | – | 0 | 9 | – | 4 | – | 0 |
| New Mexico State | 3 | – | 2 | – | 0 | 5 | – | 6 | – | 0 |
| Illinois State | 2 | – | 2 | – | 1 | 6 | – | 4 | – | 1 |
| Wichita State | 3 | – | 3 | – | 0 | 3 | – | 8 | – | 0 |
| Drake | 1 | – | 6 | – | 0 | 1 | – | 10 | – | 0 |
| West Texas State | 0 | – | 5 | – | 1 | 0 | – | 10 | – | 1 |
$ – Conference champion; ^ – NCAA Division I-AA playoff participant; The conference was a hybrid of NCAA Division I-A and I-AA programs. New Mexico State, Tulsa, and Wichita State were I-A and the other teams were I-AA.; Rankings from NCAA Division I-AA Football Committee poll

The 1983 Drake Bulldogs football team represented the Drake University as a member of the Missouri Valley Conference (MVC) during the 1983 NCAA Division I-AA football season. Led by seventh-year head coach Chuck Shelton, Drake compiled an overall record of 1–10 with a mark of 1–6 in conference play, and finished seventh in the MVC.

== Schedule ==
| Date | Opponent | Site | Result | Attendance | Source |
|---|---|---|---|---|---|
| September 3 | at Northern Iowa* | UNI-Dome; Cedar Falls, IA | L 10–34 | 13,361 | |
| September 10 | South Dakota State* | Drake Stadium; Des Moines, IA | L 3–20 | 7,250 | |
| September 17 | at Western Illinois* | Hanson Field; Macomb, IL | L 14–31 | 6,039 | |
| September 24 | Illinois State | Drake Stadium; Des Moines, IA | L 17–36 | | |
| October 1 | at Wichita State | Cessna Stadium; Wichita, KS | L 0–43 | 13,122 | |
| October 8 | at No. 3 Southern Illinois | McAndrew Stadium; Carbondale, IL | L 9–28 | 14,700 | |
| October 15 | at New Mexico State | Aggie Memorial Stadium; Las Cruces, NM | L 23–42 | | |
| October 22 | Southwest Missouri State* | Drake Stadium; Des Moines, IA | L 11–22 | | |
| October 29 | West Texas State | Drake Stadium; Des Moines, IA | W 36–26 | 1,900 | |
| November 5 | Tulsa | Drake Stadium; Des Moines, IA | L 13–22 | 4,900 | |
| November 12 | No. 9 Indiana State | Drake Stadium; Des Moines, IA | L 0–38 | 900 | |
*Non-conference game; Rankings from NCAA Division I-AA Football Committee Poll released prior to the game
