= 1983 San Diego State Aztecs football team =

American college football season

1983 San Diego State Aztecs football
- Conference: Western Athletic Conference
- Record: 3–8–1 (1–6–1 WAC)
- Head coach: Doug Scovil (3rd season)
- Offensive scheme: West Coast
- Base defense: 4–3
- Home stadium: Jack Murphy Stadium

1983 Western Athletic Conference football standings
	Conf.					Overall
Team	W		L		T	W		L		T
No. 7 BYU $	7	–	0	–	0	11	–	1	–	0
No. 13 Air Force	5	–	2	–	0	10	–	2	–	0
Wyoming	5	–	3	–	0	7	–	5	–	0
New Mexico	4	–	3	–	0	6	–	6	–	0
Hawaii	3	–	3	–	1	5	–	5	–	1
Utah	4	–	4	–	0	5	–	6	–	0
Colorado State	4	–	4	–	0	5	–	7	–	0
San Diego State	1	–	6	–	1	2	–	9	–	1
UTEP	0	–	8	–	0	2	–	10	–	0
$ – Conference champion; Rankings from AP Poll

The 1983 San Diego State Aztecs football team represented San Diego State University during the 1983 NCAA Division I-A football season as a member of the Western Athletic Conference (WAC).

The team was led by head coach Doug Scovil, in his third year, and played home games at Jack Murphy Stadium (Note: San Diego County Credit Union Stadium (SDCCU Stadium) was known as Jack Murphy Stadium from 1981 through 1997.) in San Diego, California. They finished with a record of three wins, eight losses and one tie (3–8–1, 1–6–1 WAC). This was the fewest wins for an Aztec team since they only won one in 1960, and they finished the year with seven straight losses.

Wide receiver Jim Sandusky was named a third-team All-American by the Gannett News Service and Football News. He earned first-team All-WAC honors as both a receiver and a punt returner.

== Schedule ==
Date	Opponent	Site	Result	Attendance	Source
September 3	at Tulsa*	Skelly Stadium; Tulsa, OK	L 9–34	25,429	
September 10	California*	Jack Murphy Stadium; San Diego, CA	W 28–14	19,853	
September 17	at Utah	Robert Rice Stadium; Salt Lake City, UT	L 24–27	26,712	
September 24	at UTEP	Sun Bowl; El Paso, TX	W 41–33	20,181	
October 1	at Hawaii	Aloha Stadium; Halawa, HI	T 27–27	34,153	
October 8	Long Beach State*	Jack Murphy Stadium; San Diego, CA	L 13–20	25,232	
October 15	at Colorado State	Hughes Stadium; Fort Collins, CO	L 15–17	22,979	
October 22	No. 18 BYU	Jack Murphy Stadium; San Diego, CA	L 12–47	20,515	
October 27	at UNLV*	Las Vegas Silver Bowl; Whitney, NV	W 10–28 (UNLV forfeit)	14,275	
November 12	Wyoming^{†}	Jack Murphy Stadium; San Diego, CA	L 21–33	14,530	
November 19	at New Mexico	University Stadium; Albuquerque, NM	L 14–34	15,143	
December 3	No. 17 Air Force	Jack Murphy Stadium; San Diego, CA	L 7–38	8,444	
*Non-conference game; ^{†}Homecoming; Rankings from AP Poll released prior to the game

== Team players in the NFL ==
The following were selected in the 1984 NFL draft.

Player	Position	Round	Overall	NFL team
Sean McNanie	Defensive End	3	79	Buffalo Bills
Mike Saxon	Punter	11	300	Detroit Lions

The following finished their college career in 1983, were not drafted, but played in the NFL.

Player	Position	First NFL Team
Jeff Spek	Tight End	1986 Tampa Bay Buccaneers
Matt Long	Center	1987 Philadelphia Eagles
Mike Wells	Tight End	1987 San Francisco 49ers
Trent Collins	Defensive Back	1987 New York Jets

== Team awards ==
Award	Player
Most Valuable Player (John Simcox Memorial Trophy)	Jim Sandusky
Outstanding Offensive & Defensive Linemen (Byron H. Chase Memorial Trophy)	Matt Long, Off; Jeff Miller, Def
Team captains Dr. R. Hardy / C.E. Peterson Memorial Trophy	Matt Long, Off; Thomas Carter, Def
Most Inspirational Player	Tim Delaney, Thomas Carter
