= Jim Sandusky =

American gridiron football player (born 1961)

No. 3, 7
- Position: Wide receiver

Personal information
- Born: September 9, 1961 (age 65); Othello, Washington, U.S.

Career information
- High school: Othello
- College: UNLV; San Diego State

Career history

Playing
- 1984–1987: BC Lions
- 1988: Edmonton Eskimos
- 1989–1990: Seattle Seahawks
- 1991–1996: Edmonton Eskimos
- 1998: BC Lions

Coaching
- 1995–1996: Edmonton Eskimos (WR/ST)

Awards and highlights
- 2× Grey Cup champion (1985, 1993); 2× CFL All-Star (1987, 1992); 2× CFL West All-Star (1987, 1992); Second-team All-American (1981); Third-team All-American (1983); First-team All-WAC (1983)

Jim Sandusky (born September 9, 1961) is an American former professional football player who was a wide receiver in the Canadian Football League (CFL) for the BC Lions and Edmonton Eskimos. In a 12-year career from 1984 to 1996, he caught 586 passes for 9,737 yards and 69 touchdowns.

Sandusky played college football at the University of Nevada, Las Vegas (UNLV) and San Diego State University. With the UNLV Rebels, he led the nation in receiving with 68 receptions for 1,346 yards in his junior year. After a coaching change, he transferred schools and redshirted a year. As a senior with the San Diego State Aztecs in 1983, he caught 69 passes for 1,179 yards, and was named a third-team All-American by the Gannett News Service and Football News, and received honorable mention from the Associated Press. He earned first-team all-conference honors in the Western Athletic Conference as both a receiver and a punt returner. He was the most valuable player of the 1984 Hula Bowl.

The BC Lions offered Sandusky a reasonable contract, and he signed with them even before the 1984 NFL draft. He agreed to a three-year deal, averaging $100,000 per year, and a $65,000 signing bonus.

He was drafted by the Jets in the 2nd round of the 1984 Supplemental Draft but never played for them.

== See also ==
- List of NCAA major college football yearly punt and kickoff return leaders
