= 1983 Akron Zips football team =

American college football season

1983 Akron Zips football
- Conference: Ohio Valley Conference
- Record: 8–3 (5–2 OVC)
- Head coach: Jim Dennison (11th season)
- Captain: Dave Arango; James Black; Darren Morgan
- Home stadium: Rubber Bowl

1983 Ohio Valley Conference football standings
	Conf.					Overall
Team	W		L		T	W		L		T
No. 8 Eastern Kentucky $^	6	–	1	–	0	7	–	2	–	1
No. 16 Middle Tennessee	5	–	2	–	0	8	–	2	–	0
Akron	5	–	2	–	0	8	–	3	–	0
Murray State	4	–	3	–	0	7	–	4	–	0
Austin Peay	3	–	4	–	0	6	–	5	–	0
Youngstown State	2	–	5	–	0	4	–	7	–	0
Tennessee Tech	2	–	5	–	0	2	–	8	–	0
Morehead State	1	–	6	–	0	2	–	9	–	0
$ – Conference champion; ^ – NCAA Division I-AA playoff participant; Rankings from NCAA Division I-AA Football Committee poll

The 1983 Akron Zips football team represented Akron University in the 1983 NCAA Division I-AA football season as a member of the Ohio Valley Conference. Led by 11th-year head coach Jim Dennison, the Zips played their home games at the Rubber Bowl in Akron, Ohio. They finished the season with a record of 8–3 overall and 5–2 in OVC play to tie for second place.

== Schedule ==
Date	Opponent	Rank	Site	Result	Attendance	Source
September 3	Kent State*		Rubber Bowl; Akron, OH (Wagon Wheel)	W 13–6	37,111	
September 10	at Eastern Michigan*		Rynearson Stadium; Ypsilanti, MI	W 13–0	5,173	
September 17	Western Kentucky*		Rubber Bowl; Akron, OH	W 14–13	8,845	
September 24	at No. 3 Eastern Kentucky	No. 7	Hanger Field; Richmond, KY	L 5–10	14,600	
October 1	Middle Tennessee	No. 12	Rubber Bowl; Akron, OH	L 3–26	10,214	
October 8	No. T–19 Eastern Illinois*		Rubber Bowl; Akron, OH	L 7–10		
October 15	at Morehead State		Jayne Stadium; Morehead, KY	W 31–0	6,000	
October 22	Murray State		Rubber Bowl; Akron, OH	W 6–3	2,016	
October 29	at Tennessee Tech		Tucker Stadium; Cookeville, TN	W 43–12	4,119	
November 5	Youngstown State		Rubber Bowl; Akron, OH (Steel Tire)	W 49–21		
November 19	at Austin Peay		Municipal Stadium; Clarksville, TN	W 26–3		
*Non-conference game; Rankings from NCAA Division I-AA Football Committee Poll released prior to the game
