= 1983 New Mexico Lobos football team =

American college football season

1983 New Mexico Lobos football
- Conference: Western Athletic Conference
- Record: 6–6 (4–3 WAC)
- Head coach: Joe Lee Dunn (1st season)
- Offensive coordinator: David Lee (1st season)
- Home stadium: University Stadium

1983 Western Athletic Conference football standings
	Conf.					Overall
Team	W		L		T	W		L		T
No. 7 BYU $	7	–	0	–	0	11	–	1	–	0
No. 13 Air Force	5	–	2	–	0	10	–	2	–	0
Wyoming	5	–	3	–	0	7	–	5	–	0
New Mexico	4	–	3	–	0	6	–	6	–	0
Hawaii	3	–	3	–	1	5	–	5	–	1
Utah	4	–	4	–	0	5	–	6	–	0
Colorado State	4	–	4	–	0	5	–	7	–	0
San Diego State	1	–	6	–	1	2	–	9	–	1
UTEP	0	–	8	–	0	2	–	10	–	0
$ – Conference champion; Rankings from AP Poll

The 1983 New Mexico Lobos football team was an American football team that represented the University of New Mexico in the Western Athletic Conference (WAC) during the 1983 NCAA Division I-A football season. In their first season under head coach Joe Lee Dunn, the Lobos compiled a 6–6 record (4–3 against WAC opponents) and outscored opponents by a total of 239 to 233.

The team's statistical leaders included Buddy Funck with 1,521 passing yards, Michael Johnson with 739 rushing yards, Derwin Williams with 677 receiving yards, and kicker Joe Bibbo with 61 points scored.

== Schedule ==
Date	Opponent	Site	Result	Attendance	Source
September 3	Utah	University Stadium; Albuquerque, NM	W 17–7	29,161	
September 10	at Tennessee*	Neyland Stadium; Knoxville, TN	L 6–31	89,792	
September 17	at Arkansas*	War Memorial Stadium; Little Rock, AR	L 0–17	54,212	
September 24	at New Mexico State*	Aggie Memorial Stadium; Las Cruces, NM (rivalry)	W 31–10		
October 1	North Texas State*	University Stadium; Albuquerque, NM	L 8–18		
October 8	at Texas Tech*	Jones Stadium; Lubbock, TX	W 30–10	36,543	
October 15	at No. 20 BYU	Cougar Stadium; Provo, UT	L 21–66	64,740	
October 22	at Hawaii	Aloha Stadium; Halawa, HI	L 16–25	47,799	
October 29	at Colorado State	Hughes Stadium; Fort Collins, CO	L 24–25	18,787	
November 5	Wyoming^{†}	University Stadium; Albuquerque, NM	W 17–10	19,109	
November 12	UTEP	University Stadium; Albuquerque, NM	W 35–0	16,412	
November 19	San Diego State	University Stadium; Albuquerque, NM	W 34–14	15,143	
*Non-conference game; ^{†}Homecoming; Rankings from AP Poll released prior to the game
