= 1983 Holiday Bowl =

Missouri Tigers	BYU Cougars
(7–4)	(10–1)
Big Eight	WAC
17	21
Head coach: Warren Powers	Head coach: LaVell Edwards
	AP / Coaches; 9 / 9
	1	2	3	4	Total
Missouri	7	3	0	7	17
BYU	0	7	7	7	21
- Date: December 23, 1983
- Season: 1983
- Stadium: Jack Murphy Stadium
- Location: San Diego, California
- MVP: Offensive: Steve Young (BYU); Defensive: Bobby Bell (Missouri)
- Referee: Mack Gentry (SEC)
- Halftime show: Marching bands
- Attendance: 51,480
- Payout: US$412,093 per team

United States TV coverage
- Network: ESPN
- Announcers: Jim Simpson and Bud Wilkinson

The 1983 Holiday Bowl was a college football bowl game played December 23, 1983, in San Diego, California. It was part of the 1983 NCAA Division I-A football season. It featured the unranked Missouri Tigers, and the ninth ranked BYU Cougars.

== Scoring summary ==
Missouri scored first with a 2-yard touchdown run from running back Eric Drain giving the Tigers an early 7–0 lead. In the second quarter, BYU quarterback Steve Young scored on a 10-yard touchdown run to tie the game at 7–7. Missouri's Brad Burditt kicked a 37-yard field goal, as Missouri took a 10–7 lead into halftime.

In the third quarter, BYU came up on top, thanks to a 33-yard touchdown pass from Steve Young to Eddie Stinnett giving BYU a 14–10 lead. In the fourth quarter, Eric Drain scored on his second rushing touchdown of the game, a 2-yarder, for the Tigers to take a 17–14 lead. With just 23 seconds left, Young gave a handoff to Eddie Stinnett. Stinnett then turned around and passed it back to Young, who caught it and ran in for a touchdown, giving BYU a 21–17 win.

Young achieved a rare feat in college football: one touchdown pass, one touchdown run, and one touchdown reception all in a single game. For his efforts, he was named offensive MVP. Missouri's Bobby Bell was awarded the defensive MVP. BYU had 42 rushing yards, 328 passing yards, 71 return yards, and 22:53 possession time with five turnovers. Missouri had 252 rushing yards, 86 passing yards, 22 return yards, and 37:07 possession time with four turnovers.

== Legacy ==
It was the last game of Steve Young's hall of fame college career. The game was placed in NCAA Football video games as a "College Classic", challenging players to recreate the ending. The challenge begins the Cougars' final scoring drive of the game, with the player attempting to score the go-ahead touchdown.
