= 1983 Air Force Falcons football team =

American college football season

1983 Air Force Falcons football
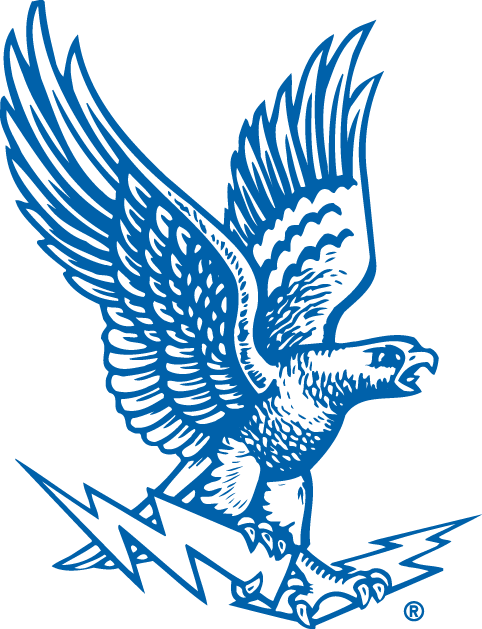

Independence Bowl champion

Independence Bowl, W 9–3 vs. Ole Miss
- Conference: Western Athletic Conference

Ranking
- Coaches: No. 15
- AP: No. 13
- Record: 10–2 (5–2 WAC)
- Head coach: Ken Hatfield (5th season)
- Offensive coordinator: Fisher DeBerry (3rd season)
- Offensive scheme: Wishbone triple option
- Defensive coordinator: Fred Goldsmith (2nd season)
- Base defense: 3–4
- Captain: All seniors
- Home stadium: Falcon Stadium

1983 Western Athletic Conference football standings
	Conf.					Overall
Team	W		L		T	W		L		T
No. 7 BYU $	7	–	0	–	0	11	–	1	–	0
No. 13 Air Force	5	–	2	–	0	10	–	2	–	0
Wyoming	5	–	3	–	0	7	–	5	–	0
New Mexico	4	–	3	–	0	6	–	6	–	0
Hawaii	3	–	3	–	1	5	–	5	–	1
Utah	4	–	4	–	0	5	–	6	–	0
Colorado State	4	–	4	–	0	5	–	7	–	0
San Diego State	1	–	6	–	1	2	–	9	–	1
UTEP	0	–	8	–	0	2	–	10	–	0
$ – Conference champion; Rankings from AP Poll

The 1983 Air Force Falcons football team represented the United States Air Force Academy in the Western Athletic Conference (WAC) during the 1983 NCAA Division I-A football season. In their 5th season under head coach Ken Hatfield, Air Force played its home games at Falcon Stadium in Colorado Springs and finished the regular season at 9–2 (5–2 in WAC, runner-up). The Falcons were invited to play in the Independence Bowl and defeated Ole Miss 9–3. With a 10–2 record, Air Force climbed to thirteenth in the final AP poll.

After the season in December, Hatfield left for Arkansas, his alma mater, where he succeeded Lou Holtz as head coach. Days later, offensive coordinator Fisher DeBerry was promoted, and he was the Falcons' head coach for the next 23 seasons.

== Schedule ==
Date	Opponent	Rank	Site	TV	Result	Attendance	Source
September 3	at Colorado State		Hughes Stadium; Fort Collins, CO (rivalry)		W 34–13	28,652	
September 10	Texas Tech*		Falcon Stadium; Colorado Springs, CO	ABC	W 28–13	26,800	
September 17	at Wyoming		War Memorial Stadium; Laramie, WY		L 7–14	30,194	
September 24	BYU		Falcon Stadium; Colorado Springs, CO		L 28–46	34,255	
October 8	at Navy*		Navy–Marine Corps Memorial Stadium; Annapolis, MD (Commander-in-Chief's Trophy)		W 44–17	34,257	
October 15	UTEP		Falcon Stadium; Colorado Springs, CO		W 37–25	27,474	
October 22	Utah		Falcon Stadium; Colorado Springs, CO		W 33–31	23,248	
October 29	Army*		Falcon Stadium; Colorado Springs, CO (Commander-in-Chief's Trophy)		W 41–20	47,032	
November 5	Hawaii		Falcon Stadium; Colorado Springs, CO (rivalry)		W 45–10	26,501	
November 19	at Notre Dame*		Notre Dame Stadium; Notre Dame, IN (rivalry)		W 23–22	59,075	
December 3	at San Diego State	No. 17	Jack Murphy Stadium; San Diego, CA		W 38–7	8,444	
December 10	vs. Ole Miss*	No. 16	Independence Stadium; Shreveport, LA (Independence Bowl)		W 9–3	41,274	
*Non-conference game; Rankings from AP Poll released prior to the game

== Game summaries ==
=== Notre Dame ===
Chris Funk blocked a field goal in the final seconds to preserve the win for Air Force.

== Roster ==
1983 Air Force Falcons football team roster
Players
Coaches
Offense

Pos.	#	Name	Class
FB		John Kreshner	Sr
QB		Bart Weiss

Defense

Pos.	#	Name	Class
DL	96	Chris Funk	Jr
DL	50	Steve Kelly	Jr
DL	62	Larry Nicklas	Jr
DL	74	John Ziegler	So
LB		Terry Maki	Fr
CB		Tom Rotello	Fr
S		Scott Thomas	So

Special teams

Pos.	#	Name	Class

Head coach

- Ken Hatfield (5th year)

Coordinators/assistant coaches

- Fisher DeBerry (OC)

Legend

- (C) Team captain
- (S) Suspended
- (I) Ineligible
- Injured
- Redshirt

== Awards and honors ==
- John Kershner, 3rd Team All-American (Football News)
