= 1983 Lamar Cardinals football team =

American college football season

1983 Lamar Cardinals football
- Conference: Southland Conference
- Record: 2–9 (1–5 Southland)
- Head coach: Ken Stephens (2nd season)
- Home stadium: Cardinal Stadium

1983 Southland Conference football standings
	Conf.					Overall
Team	W		L		T	W		L		T
No. 13 Northeast Louisiana +	5	–	1	–	0	8	–	3	–	0
No. 4 North Texas State +^	5	–	1	–	0	8	–	4	–	0
McNeese State	3	–	3	–	0	6	–	5	–	0
Arkansas State	3	–	3	–	0	5	–	5	–	1
UT Arlington	2	–	4	–	0	5	–	6	–	0
Louisiana Tech	2	–	4	–	0	4	–	7	–	0
Lamar	1	–	5	–	0	2	–	9	–	0
+ – Conference co-champions; ^ – NCAA Division I-AA playoff participant; Rankings from NCAA Division I-AA Football Committee poll

The 1983 Lamar Cardinals football team represented Lamar University in the 1983 NCAA Division I-AA football season as a member of the Southland Conference. The Cardinals played their home games at Cardinal Stadium now named Provost Umphrey Stadium in Beaumont, Texas. Lamar finished the 1983 season with a 2–9 overall record and a 1–5 conference record.

== Schedule ==
Date	Opponent	Site	Result	Attendance	Source
September 3	at Nicholls State*	John L. Guidry Stadium; Thibodaux, LA	L 14–21		
September 10	Stephen F. Austin*	Cardinal Stadium; Beaumont, TX	W 24–23		
September 17	at Houston*	Houston, Astrodome; Houston, TX	L 35–42	25,456	
September 24	at Louisiana Tech	Joe Aillet Stadium; Ruston, LA	W 18–12	16,200	
October 1	Texas Southern*	Cardinal Stadium; Beaumont, TX	L 14–15		
October 8	No. 9 Northeast Louisiana	Cardinal Stadium; Beaumont, TX	L 0–17		
October 15	at UT Arlington	Maverick Stadium; Arlington, TX	L 0–21	5,449	
October 22	at Southwestern Louisiana*	Cajun Field; Lafayette, LA (rivalry)	L 6–31	17,431	
November 5	at No. 12 North Texas State	Fouts Field; Denton, TX	L 0–10		
November 12	Arkansas State	Cardinal Stadium; Beaumont, TX	L 14–24		
November 19	McNeese State	Cardinal Stadium; Beaumont, TX (rivalry)	L 7–17		
*Non-conference game; Rankings from NCAA Division I-AA Football Committee Poll released prior to the game
