= 1983 UT Arlington Mavericks football team =

American college football season

1983 UT Arlington Mavericks football
- Conference: Southland Conference
- Record: 5–6 (2–4 Southland)
- Head coach: Harold Elliott (10th season)
- Home stadium: Maverick Stadium

1983 Southland Conference football standings
	Conf.					Overall
Team	W		L		T	W		L		T
No. 13 Northeast Louisiana +	5	–	1	–	0	8	–	3	–	0
No. 4 North Texas State +^	5	–	1	–	0	8	–	4	–	0
McNeese State	3	–	3	–	0	6	–	5	–	0
Arkansas State	3	–	3	–	0	5	–	5	–	1
UT Arlington	2	–	4	–	0	5	–	6	–	0
Louisiana Tech	2	–	4	–	0	4	–	7	–	0
Lamar	1	–	5	–	0	2	–	9	–	0
+ – Conference co-champions; ^ – NCAA Division I-AA playoff participant; Rankings from NCAA Division I-AA Football Committee poll

The 1983 UT Arlington Mavericks football team was an American football team that represented the University of Texas at Arlington in the Southland Conference during the 1983 NCAA Division I-AA football season. In their tenth year under head coach Harold Elliott, the team compiled a 5–6 record.

== Schedule ==
Date	Opponent	Site	Result	Attendance	Source
September 10	Western Michigan*	Maverick Stadium; Arlington, TX	L 14–21		
September 17	Northeast Louisiana	Maverick Stadium; Arlington, TX	L 10–16	7,338	
September 24	at West Texas State*	Kimbrough Memorial Stadium; Canyon, TX	W 31–13	8,478	
October 1	at No. 13 (I-A) SMU*	Texas Stadium; Irving, TX	L 0–34	23,578	
October 8	Wichita State*	Maverick Stadium; Arlington, TX	W 34–24	5,187	
October 15	Lamar	Maverick Stadium; Arlington, TX	W 21–0	5,449	
October 22	New Mexico State*	Maverick Stadium; Arlington, TX	W 28–7	4,271	
October 29	at Arkansas State	Indian Stadium; Jonesboro, AR	W 28–19	15,639	
November 5	at McNeese State	Cowboy Stadium; Lake Charles, LA	L 16–20		
November 12	Louisiana Tech	Maverick Stadium; Arlington, TX	L 17–24	4,055	
November 19	at No. 5 North Texas State	Fouts Field; Denton, TX	L 15–52	11,400	
*Non-conference game; Rankings from NCAA Division I-AA Football Committee Poll released prior to the game
