= 1983 Youngstown State Penguins football team =

American college football season

1983 Youngstown State Penguins football
- Conference: Ohio Valley Conference
- Record: 4–7 (2–5 OVC)
- Head coach: Bill Narduzzi (9th season)
- Home stadium: Stambaugh Stadium

1983 Ohio Valley Conference football standings
	Conf.					Overall
Team	W		L		T	W		L		T
No. 8 Eastern Kentucky $^	6	–	1	–	0	7	–	2	–	1
No. 16 Middle Tennessee	5	–	2	–	0	8	–	2	–	0
Akron	5	–	2	–	0	8	–	3	–	0
Murray State	4	–	3	–	0	7	–	4	–	0
Austin Peay	3	–	4	–	0	6	–	5	–	0
Youngstown State	2	–	5	–	0	4	–	7	–	0
Tennessee Tech	2	–	5	–	0	2	–	8	–	0
Morehead State	1	–	6	–	0	2	–	9	–	0
$ – Conference champion; ^ – NCAA Division I-AA playoff participant; Rankings from NCAA Division I-AA Football Committee poll

The 1983 Youngstown State Penguins football team represented Youngstown State University during the 1983 NCAA Division I-AA football season as a member of the Ohio Valley Conference (OVC). Led by ninth-year head coach Bill Narduzzi, the Penguins compiled an overall record of 4–7 with a mark of 2–5 on conference play, and finished tied for sixth in the OVC.

== Schedule ==
Date	Opponent	Site	Result	Attendance	Source
September 10	Eastern Kentucky	Stambaugh Stadium; Youngstown, OH	L 23–28	13,349	
September 17	at Tennessee Tech	Tucker Stadium; Cookeville, TN	W 34–22		
September 24	Western Illinois*	Stambaugh Stadium; Youngstown, OH	W 42–14		
October 1	at Eastern Illinois*	O'Brien Stadium; Charleston, IL	L 20–21		
October 8	Western Kentucky*	Stambaugh Stadium; Youngstown, OH	W 24–13	6,134	
October 15	Austin Peay^{†}	Stambaugh Stadium; Youngstown, OH	W 41–19		
October 22	at Northern Iowa*	UNI-Dome; Cedar Falls, IA	L 13–23	7,311	
October 29	at No. 9 Middle Tennessee	Johnny "Red" Floyd Stadium; Murfreesboro, TN	L 24–35	5,500	
November 5	at Akron	Rubber Bowl; Akron, OH (rivalry)	L 21–49		
November 12	Murray State	Stambaugh Stadium; Youngstown, OH	L 7–19	2,400	
November 19	Morehead State	Stambaugh Stadium; Youngstown, OH	L 20–27		
*Non-conference game; ^{†}Homecoming; Rankings from NCAA Division I-AA Football Committee Poll released prior to the game
