= 1983 Southern Illinois Salukis football team =

American college football season

1983 Southern Illinois Salukis football

NCAA Division I-AA national champion

NCAA Division I-AA Championship Game, W 43–7 vs. Western Carolina
- Conference: Missouri Valley Conference
- Record: 13–1 (4–1 MVC)
- Head coach: Rey Dempsey (8th season)
- Home stadium: McAndrew Stadium

1983 Missouri Valley Conference football standings
| | Conf. | | | | | Overall |
| Team | W | | L | | T | W | | L | | T |
|---|---|---|---|---|---|---|---|---|---|---|
| Tulsa $ | 5 | – | 0 | – | 0 | 8 | – | 3 | – | 0 |
| No. 1 Southern Illinois ^ | 4 | – | 1 | – | 0 | 13 | – | 1 | – | 0 |
| No. 5 Indiana State ^ | 3 | – | 2 | – | 0 | 9 | – | 4 | – | 0 |
| New Mexico State | 3 | – | 2 | – | 0 | 5 | – | 6 | – | 0 |
| Illinois State | 2 | – | 2 | – | 1 | 6 | – | 4 | – | 1 |
| Wichita State | 3 | – | 3 | – | 0 | 3 | – | 8 | – | 0 |
| Drake | 1 | – | 6 | – | 0 | 1 | – | 10 | – | 0 |
| West Texas State | 0 | – | 5 | – | 1 | 0 | – | 10 | – | 1 |
$ – Conference champion; ^ – NCAA Division I-AA playoff participant; The conference was a hybrid of NCAA Division I-A and I-AA programs. New Mexico State, Tulsa, and Wichita State were I-A and the other teams were I-AA.; Rankings from NCAA Division I-AA Football Committee poll

The 1983 Southern Illinois Salukis football team was an American football team that represented Southern Illinois University (now known as Southern Illinois University Carbondale) in the Missouri Valley Conference (MVC) during the 1983 NCAA Division I-AA football season. In their eighth year under head coach Rey Dempsey, the Salukis compiled a 13–1 record (4–1 in conference games), finished second in the MVC, and outscored their opponents by a total of 448 to 187. They played in the Division I-AA playoffs and won the Division I-AA national championship with a victory over Western Carolina in the championship game.

The Salukis scored an average of 32.6 points per game and allowed opponents to score 14.3 points per game. They set multiple school records, including most victories (13), most points (448), and most total offense (4,399 yards). Quarterback Rick Johnson ended his SIU career with the school record with 5,804 passing yards. Placekicker Ron Miller set the school's season scoring record with 110 points.

The defensive secondary set a school record with 41 interceptions (including eight against New Mexico State), and was led by three veteran defensive backs:

- Cornerback Terry Taylor was named to the Division I-AA All-America team. He later played 12 years in the NFL. Quarterback Rick Johnson later described Taylor's impact on opposing quarterbacks: ""With Terry Taylor, you could see the fear in the quarterback's eyes."
- Cornerback Donnell Daniel was named MVC Defensive Player of the Year.
- Free safety Gregg Shipp, a fifth-year senior, led the defensive backfield with 72 tackles. He set a school single-game record with four interceptions against Western Carolina.

The team was inducted as a group into the SIU Salukis Hall of Fame in 2023.

The team played its home games at McAndrew Stadium in Carbondale, Illinois.

== Schedule ==
| Date | Opponent | Rank | Site | Result | Attendance | Source |
|---|---|---|---|---|---|---|
| September 3 | at Western Illinois* | | Hanson Field; Macomb, IL | W 38–6 | 8,893 | |
| September 10 | Eastern Illinois* | | McAndrew Stadium; Carbondale, IL | W 17–14 | 12,800 | |
| September 17 | Southeast Missouri State* | | McAndrew Stadium; Carbondale, IL | W 56–7 | 10,200 | |
| September 24 | at Northern Iowa* | No. 8 | UNI-Dome; Cedar Falls, IA | W 52–9 | 11,613 | |
| October 1 | at Arkansas State* | No. 5 | Indian Stadium; Jonesboro, AR | W 35–28 | 10,281 | |
| October 8 | Drake | No. 3 | McAndrew Stadium; Carbondale, IL | W 28–9 | 14,700 | |
| October 15 | at Southwest Missouri State* | No. 2 | Briggs Stadium; Springfield, MO | W 24–6 | 7,700 | |
| October 22 | at No. 14 Indiana State | No. 2 | Memorial Stadium; Terre Haute, IN | W 34–21 | 14,111 | |
| October 29 | New Mexico State | No. 1 | McAndrew Stadium; Carbondale, IL | W 41–3 | 14,000 | |
| November 5 | Illinois State | No. 1 | McAndrew Stadium; Carbondale, IL | W 28–26 | 16,600 | |
| November 12 | at Wichita State | No. 1 | Cessna Stadium; Wichita, KS | L 6–28 | 3,911 | |
| December 3 | No. 5 Indiana State* | No. 1 | McAndrew Stadium; Carbondale, IL (NCAA Division I-AA Quarterfinal) | W 23–7 | 8,000 | |
| December 10 | No. 11 Nevada* | No. 1 | McAndrew Stadium; Carbondale, IL (NCAA Division I-AA Semifinal) | W 23–7 | 12,000 | |
| December 17 | vs. No. 9 Western Carolina* | No. 1 | Johnson Hagood Stadium; Charleston, SC (NCAA Division I-AA Championship Game) | W 43–7 | 15,950 | |
*Non-conference game; Rankings from NCAA Division I-AA Football Committee Poll released prior to the game

== Roster ==
1983 Southern Illinois Salukis football team roster
Players
Coaches
Offense

| Pos. | # | Name | Class |
|---|---|---|---|
| WR | 9 | Tony Adams | Jr |
| C | 59 | Tom Baugh | So |
| QB | 16 | Rick Johnson | Sr |
| TE | 84 | Mike O'Day | So |
| QB | 15 | Rick Spielman | Fr |

Defense

| Pos. | # | Name | Class |
|---|---|---|---|
| LB | 99 | Frank Carr | So |
| DT | 74 | Ed Norman | Sr |
| S | 21 | Terry Taylor | Sr |
| DE | 93 | Dan Wetzel | So |

Special teams

| Pos. | # | Name | Class |

Head coach

- Rey Dempsey

Coordinators/assistant coaches

Legend

- (C) Team captain
- (S) Suspended
- (I) Ineligible
- Injured
- Redshirt
