= 1983 Southwest Missouri State Bears football team =

American college football season

1983 Southwest Missouri State Bears football
- Conference: Association of Mid-Continent Universities
- Record: 6–5 (2–1 Mid-Con)
- Head coach: Rich Johanningmeier (8th season)
- Captains: William Bates; Mike Panko
- Home stadium: Briggs Stadium

1983 Association of Mid-Continent Universities football standings
| | Conf. | | | | | Overall |
| Team | W | | L | | T | W | | L | | T |
|---|---|---|---|---|---|---|---|---|---|---|
| No. 6 Eastern Illinois $^ | 3 | – | 0 | – | 0 | 9 | – | 3 | – | 0 |
| Southwest Missouri State | 2 | – | 1 | – | 0 | 6 | – | 5 | – | 0 |
| Northern Iowa | 1 | – | 2 | – | 0 | 6 | – | 5 | – | 0 |
| Western Illinois | 0 | – | 3 | – | 0 | 3 | – | 8 | – | 0 |
$ – Conference champion; ^ – NCAA Division I-AA playoff participant; Rankings from NCAA Division I-AA Football Committee poll

The 1983 Southwest Missouri State Bears football team represented Southwest Missouri State University (now known as Missouri State University) as a member of the Association of Mid-Continent Universities (Mid-Con) during the 1983 NCAA Division I-AA football season. Led by eighth-year head coach Rich Johanningmeier, the Bears compiled an overall record of 6–5, with a mark of 2–1 in conference play, and finished second in the Mid-Con.

== Schedule ==
| Date | Opponent | Site | Result | Attendance | Source |
|---|---|---|---|---|---|
| September 10 | at Western Illinois | Hanson Field; Macomb, IL | W 21–9 | 5,739 | |
| September 17 | Northern Iowa | Briggs Stadium; Springfield, MO | W 35–13 | 7,350 | |
| September 24 | at Lincoln (MO)* | Lincoln Stadium; Jefferson City, MO | W 36–12 | 500 | |
| October 1 | Southeast Missouri State* | Briggs Stadium; Springfield, MO | W 40–0 | 7,350 | |
| October 8 | at Murray State* | Roy Stewart Stadium; Murray, KY | L 7–19 | 12,863 | |
| October 15 | No. 2 Southern Illinois* | Briggs Stadium; Springfield, MO | L 6–24 | 7,700 | |
| October 22 | at Drake* | Drake Stadium; Des Moines, IA | W 22–11 | | |
| October 29 | at Nicholls State* | John L. Guidry Stadium; Thibodaux, LA | L 7–33 | | |
| November 5 | at No. 13 Eastern Illinois | O'Brien Stadium; Charleston, IL | L 3–12 | | |
| November 12 | at Illinois State* | Hancock Stadium; Normal, IL | L 7–34 | 6,101 | |
| November 19 | Northeast Missouri State* | Briggs Stadium; Springfield, MO | W 17–14 | 1,050 | |
*Non-conference game; Rankings from NCAA Division I-AA Football Committee Poll released prior to the game
