= 1983 Northern Iowa Panthers football team =

American college football season

1983 Northern Iowa Panthers football
- Conference: Association of Mid-Continent Universities
- Record: 6–5 (1–2 Mid-Cont)
- Head coach: Darrell Mudra (1st season)
- Offensive coordinator: Walt Klinker
- Defensive coordinator: Dennis Remmert (13th season)
- Home stadium: UNI-Dome

1983 Association of Mid-Continent Universities football standings
| | Conf. | | | | | Overall |
| Team | W | | L | | T | W | | L | | T |
|---|---|---|---|---|---|---|---|---|---|---|
| No. 6 Eastern Illinois $^ | 3 | – | 0 | – | 0 | 9 | – | 3 | – | 0 |
| Southwest Missouri State | 2 | – | 1 | – | 0 | 6 | – | 5 | – | 0 |
| Northern Iowa | 1 | – | 2 | – | 0 | 6 | – | 5 | – | 0 |
| Western Illinois | 0 | – | 3 | – | 0 | 3 | – | 8 | – | 0 |
$ – Conference champion; ^ – NCAA Division I-AA playoff participant; Rankings from NCAA Division I-AA Football Committee poll

The 1983 Northern Iowa Panthers football team was an American football team that represented the University of Northern Iowa as a member of the Association of Mid-Continent Universities (Mid-Con) during the 1983 NCAA Division I-AA football season. In its first season under head coach Darrell Mudra, the team compiled a 6–5 record (1–2 in conference games) and finished in third place out of four teams in the Mid-Con. Mudra was hired in December 1982 after 24 years as a head coach with seven other college and professional programs, including the Montreal Alouettes, Arizona Wildcats, and Florida State Seminoles.

Six Northern Iowa players were honored as first-team players on the 1983 all-Mid-Con team: tight end James Hutchings; wide receiver Darryl Goree; offensive lineman John Waskosky; quarterback Larry Miller; defensive back Joe Fuller; and punter Mike Johnson. Six others, including running back Chris Miliner, were named to the second team. Notable statistical achievements included Mark Holmes with 21 pass breakups, Jim Fuller with 15.64 yards per punt return, and Mike Johnson with an average of 43.22 yards on 54 punts.

The team played its home games at the UNI-Dome in Cedar Falls, Iowa.

== Schedule ==
| Date | Time | Opponent | Site | Result | Attendance | Source |
|---|---|---|---|---|---|---|
| September 3 | 7:30 p.m. | Drake* | UNI-Dome; Cedar Falls, IA | W 34–10 | 13,361 | |
| September 10 | 6:30 p.m. | at Indiana State* | Memorial Stadium; Terre Haute, IN | L 0–26 | 8,914 | |
| September 17 | 7:00 p.m. | at Southwest Missouri State | Briggs Stadium; Springfield, MO | L 13–35 | 7,350 | |
| September 24 | 7:30 p.m. | No. 8 Southern Illinois* | UNI-Dome; Cedar Falls, IA | L 9–52 | 11,613 | |
| October 1 | 1:30 p.m. | at Western Illinois | Hanson Field; Macomb, IL | W 32–26 | 5,601 | |
| October 8 | 1:30 p.m. | Wisconsin–La Crosse*^{†} | UNI-Dome; Cedar Falls, IA | W 41–0 | 9,791 | |
| October 15 | 1:30 p.m. | at No. 14 Eastern Illinois | O'Brien Stadium; Charleston, IL | L 0–13 | 7,100 | |
| October 22 | 7:30 p.m. | Youngstown State* | UNI-Dome; Cedar Falls, IA | W 23–13 | 7,311 | |
| October 29 | 1:00 p.m. | at Northern Michigan* | Memorial Field; Marquette, MI | L 26–45 | 1,834 | |
| November 5 | 1:30 p.m. | at Central Missouri* | Kennedy Field; Warrensburg, MO | W 20–7 | 2,000 | |
| November 12 | 7:30 p.m. | Northwest Missouri State* | UNI-Dome; Cedar Falls, IA | W 30–21 | 13,518 | |
*Non-conference game; ^{†}Homecoming; Rankings from NCAA Division I-AA Football Committee Poll released prior to the game; All times are in Central time
