= Bruce Craddock =

American football player and coach (1944–1990)

Biographical details
- Born: February 19, 1944; Washington, D.C., U.S.
- Died: February 22, 1990 (aged 46); Macomb, Illinois, U.S.

Playing career
- 1964–1965: Northeast Missouri State
- Position: Offensive lineman

Coaching career (HC unless noted)
- 1970–1971: Northeast Missouri State (OL)
- 1972–1974: Vermont (OL)
- 1975–1978: Northeast Missouri State (assistant)
- 1979–1982: Northeast Missouri State
- 1983–1989: Western Illinois

Head coaching record
- Overall: 65–54–1
- Tournaments: 0–1 (NCAA D-II playoffs); 0–1 (NCAA D-I-AA playoffs)

Accomplishments and honors

Championships
- 2 MIAA (1981–1982); GCAC (1988)

Awards
- All-MIAA Honorable Mention (1965); 2× MIAA Coach of the Year (1981–1982); Truman State Athletics Hall of Fame (1989)

Richard Bruce Craddock (February 19, 1944 – February 22, 1990) was an American football coach. He served as the head football coach at Northeast Missouri State University—now known as Truman State University—in Kirksville, Missouri from 1979 to 1982 and Western Illinois University in Macomb, Illinois and he from 1983 to 1989, compiling a career college football coaching record of 65–54–1.

== Career ==
Craddock graduated in 1966 from Northeast Missouri State University—now known Truman State University—in Kirksville, Missouri—where he was a member of Phi Sigma Kappa fraternity. After serving in the Vietnam War, he began his coaching career at Northeast Missouri State as an assistant coach from 1970 to 1971. He was an assistant coach at the University of Vermont from 1972 to 1974, before returning to Northeast Missouri State in 1975 as an assistant. He was a guest coach for the Saskatchewan Roughriders of the Canadian Football League (CFL) from 1979 to 1982. Craddock was named head football coach at Western Illinois University in 1982.

== Death ==
Craddock died on February 22, 1990, aged 46, after a 10-month battle against cancer in a Macomb, Illinois hospital. Physicians linked the cancer to his exposure to Agent Orange during the Vietnam War, where he was a United States Marine Corps captain from 1967 to 1970.

== Head coaching record ==
Year	Team	Overall	Conference	Standing	Bowl/playoffs	NCAA^{#}
Northeast Missouri State Bulldogs (Missouri Intercollegiate Athletic Association) (1979–1982)
1979	Northeast Missouri State	4–7	3–3	T–3rd		
1980	Northeast Missouri State	5–6	3–3	T–3rd		
1981	Northeast Missouri State	6–4	4–1	1st		
1982	Northeast Missouri State	9–2	5–0	1st	L NCAA Division II Quarterfinal	
Northeast Missouri State:		24–19	15–7			
Western Illinois Leathernecks (Association of Mid-Continent Universities) (1983–1984)
1983	Western Illinois	3–8	0–3	4th		
1984	Western Illinois	6–4–1	0–2–1	4th		
Western Illinois Leathernecks (Gateway Collegiate Athletic Conference) (1985–1989)
1985	Western Illinois	5–5	2–3	T–3rd		
1986	Western Illinois	6–5	2–4	5th		
1987	Western Illinois	7–4	5–1	2nd		
1988	Western Illinois	10–2	6–0	1st	L NCAA Division I-AA First Round	3
1989	Western Illinois	4–7	1–5	T–6th		
Western Illinois:		41–35–1	16–13			
Total:		65–54–1				
National championship Conference title Conference division title or championship game berth
^{#}Rankings from final NCAA Division I-AA Football Committee poll.
