= 1983 McNeese State Cowboys football team =

American college football season

1983 McNeese State Cowboys football
- Conference: Southland Conference
- Record: 6–5 (3–3 Southland)
- Head coach: John McCann (1st season)
- Home stadium: Cowboy Stadium

1983 Southland Conference football standings
	Conf.					Overall
Team	W		L		T	W		L		T
No. 13 Northeast Louisiana +	5	–	1	–	0	8	–	3	–	0
No. 4 North Texas State +^	5	–	1	–	0	8	–	4	–	0
McNeese State	3	–	3	–	0	6	–	5	–	0
Arkansas State	3	–	3	–	0	5	–	5	–	1
UT Arlington	2	–	4	–	0	5	–	6	–	0
Louisiana Tech	2	–	4	–	0	4	–	7	–	0
Lamar	1	–	5	–	0	2	–	9	–	0
+ – Conference co-champions; ^ – NCAA Division I-AA playoff participant; Rankings from NCAA Division I-AA Football Committee poll

The 1983 McNeese State Cowboys football team was an American football team that represented McNeese State University as a member of the Southland Conference (Southland) during the 1983 NCAA Division I-AA football season. In their first year under head coach John McCann, the team compiled an overall record of 6–5, with a mark of 3–3 in conference play, and finished tied for third in the Southland.

== Schedule ==
Date	Opponent	Rank	Site	Result	Attendance	Source
September 3	at Northwestern State*		Harry Turpin Stadium; Natchitoches, LA (rivalry)	W 18–13		
September 10	at Southeastern Louisiana*		Strawberry Stadium; Hammond, LA	W 23–0		
September 17	West Texas State*		Cowboy Stadium; Lake Charles, LA	W 17–0	21,621	
September 24	Nicholls State*	No. 2	Cowboy Stadium; Lake Charles, LA	L 27–30	20,000	
October 8	at Louisiana Tech	No. 11	Joe Aillet Stadium; Ruston, LA	W 24–20	19,900	
October 15	No. 10 North Texas State	No. 11	Cowboy Stadium; Lake Charles, LA	L 10–17	21,500	
October 22	Arkansas State	No. T–18	Cowboy Stadium; Lake Charles, LA	L 14–24		
October 29	at No. 4 Northeast Louisiana		Malone Stadium; Monroe, LA	L 6–37		
November 5	UT Arlington		Cowboy Stadium; Lake Charles, LA	W 20–16		
November 12	at Southwestern Louisiana*		Cajun Field; Lafayette, LA (rivalry)	L 16–48		
November 19	at Lamar		Cardinal Stadium; Beaumont, TX (rivalry)	W 17–7		
*Non-conference game; Rankings from NCAA Division I-AA Football Committee Poll released prior to the game
