= 1983 UTEP Miners football team =

American college football season

1983 UTEP Miners football
- Conference: Western Athletic Conference
- Record: 2–10 (0–8 WAC)
- Head coach: Bill Yung (2nd season)
- Offensive coordinator: Hal Mumme (2nd season)
- Offensive scheme: Spread
- Defensive coordinator: Denny Doornbos (1st season)
- Base defense: 3–4
- Home stadium: Sun Bowl

1983 Western Athletic Conference football standings
	Conf.					Overall
Team	W		L		T	W		L		T
No. 7 BYU $	7	–	0	–	0	11	–	1	–	0
No. 13 Air Force	5	–	2	–	0	10	–	2	–	0
Wyoming	5	–	3	–	0	7	–	5	–	0
New Mexico	4	–	3	–	0	6	–	6	–	0
Hawaii	3	–	3	–	1	5	–	5	–	1
Utah	4	–	4	–	0	5	–	6	–	0
Colorado State	4	–	4	–	0	5	–	7	–	0
San Diego State	1	–	6	–	1	2	–	9	–	1
UTEP	0	–	8	–	0	2	–	10	–	0
$ – Conference champion; Rankings from AP Poll

The 1983 UTEP Miners football team was an American football team that represented the University of Texas at El Paso in the Western Athletic Conference during the 1983 NCAA Division I-A football season. In their second year under head coach Bill Yung, the team compiled a 2–10 record.

== Schedule ==
Date	Opponent	Site	Result	Attendance	Source
September 3	New Mexico State*	Sun Bowl; El Paso, TX (rivalry)	W 20–9	35,211	
September 10	Idaho State*	Sun Bowl; El Paso, TX	L 10–12	20,193	
September 17	Baylor*	Sun Bowl; El Paso, TX	L 6–20	25,709	
September 24	San Diego State	Sun Bowl; El Paso, TX	L 33–41	20,181	
October 1	at Wyoming	War Memorial Stadium; Laramie, WY	L 17–49	21,127	
October 8	at Utah	Robert Rice Stadium; Salt Lake City, UT	L 11–35	25,203	
October 15	at Air Force	Falcon Stadium; Colorado Springs, CO	L 25–37	27,474	
October 22	Colorado State^{†}	Sun Bowl; El Paso, TX	L 15–31	15,401	
October 29	at Hawaii	Aloha Stadium; Halawa, HI	L 24–25	40,785	
November 5	No. 12 BYU	Sun Bowl; El Paso, TX	L 9–31	15,487	
November 12	at New Mexico	University Stadium; Albuquerque, NM	L 0–35	16,412	
November 19	Weber State*	Sun Bowl; El Paso, TX	W 40–34	11,500	
*Non-conference game; ^{†}Homecoming; Rankings from AP Poll released prior to the game
