= 1983 Wichita State Shockers football team =

American college football season

1983 Wichita State Shockers football
- Conference: Missouri Valley Conference
- Record: 3–8 (3–3 MVC)
- Head coach: Willie Jeffries (5th season)
- Offensive coordinator: Fayne Henson (2nd season)
- Offensive scheme: Freeze option
- Defensive coordinator: Ben Blacknall (5th season)
- Base defense: 4–3
- Home stadium: Cessna Stadium

1983 Missouri Valley Conference football standings
	Conf.					Overall
Team	W		L		T	W		L		T
Tulsa $	5	–	0	–	0	8	–	3	–	0
No. 1 Southern Illinois ^	4	–	1	–	0	13	–	1	–	0
No. 5 Indiana State ^	3	–	2	–	0	9	–	4	–	0
New Mexico State	3	–	2	–	0	5	–	6	–	0
Illinois State	2	–	2	–	1	6	–	4	–	1
Wichita State	3	–	3	–	0	3	–	8	–	0
Drake	1	–	6	–	0	1	–	10	–	0
West Texas State	0	–	5	–	1	0	–	10	–	1
$ – Conference champion; ^ – NCAA Division I-AA playoff participant; The conference was a hybrid of NCAA Division I-A and I-AA programs. New Mexico State, Tulsa, and Wichita State were I-A and the other teams were I-AA.; Rankings from NCAA Division I-AA Football Committee poll

The 1983 Wichita State Shockers football team was an American football team that represented Wichita State as a member of the Missouri Valley Conference during the 1983 NCAA Division I-A football season. In their fifth year under head coach Willie Jeffries, the team compiled a 3–8 record.

== Schedule ==
Date	Opponent	Site	Result	Attendance	Source
September 3	Missouri Southern*	Cessna Stadium; Wichita, KS	L 21–29		
September 10	at Ball State*	Ball State Stadium; Muncie, IN	L 21–25	8,430	
September 17	at Kansas*	Memorial Stadium; Lawrence, KS	L 6–57	36,500	
September 24	at Arizona State*	Sun Devil Stadium; Tempe, AZ	L 14–44	63,585	
October 1	Drake	Cessna Stadium; Wichita, KS	W 43–0	13,122	
October 8	at UT Arlington*	Maverick Stadium; Arlington, TX	L 24–34	5,187	
October 15	at Indiana State	Memorial Stadium; Terre Haute, IN	L 22–24	8,782	
October 22	West Texas State	Cessna Stadium; Wichita, KS	W 31–30	5,711	
October 29	at Tulsa	Skelly Stadium; Tulsa, OK	L 19–30	23,947	
November 5	at New Mexico State	Aggie Memorial Stadium; Las Cruces, NM	L 28–62	21,847	
November 12	Southern Illinois	Cessna Stadium; Wichita, KS	W 28–6	3,911	
*Non-conference game
