= 1983 Southwestern Louisiana Ragin' Cajuns football team =

American college football season

1983 Southwestern Louisiana Ragin' Cajuns football
- Conference: Independent
- Record: 4–6
- Head coach: Sam Robertson (4th season)
- Home stadium: Cajun Field

1983 NCAA Division I-A independents football records
	Conf.					Overall
Team	W		L		T	W		L		T
No. 1 Miami (FL)		–		–		11	–	1	–	0
Virginia Tech		–		–		9	–	2	–	0
No. 19 Boston College		–		–		9	–	3	–	0
No. 16 West Virginia		–		–		9	–	3	–	0
No. 20 East Carolina		–		–		8	–	3	–	0
No. 18 Pittsburgh		–		–		8	–	3	–	1
Florida State		–		–		8	–	4	–	0
Penn State		–		–		8	–	4	–	1
Southern Miss		–		–		7	–	4	–	0
Memphis State		–		–		6	–	4	–	1
Notre Dame		–		–		7	–	5	–	0
Syracuse		–		–		6	–	5	–	0
South Carolina		–		–		5	–	6	–	0
Cincinnati			–			4	–	6	–	1
Southwestern Louisiana		–		–		4	–	6	–	0
Temple		–		–		4	–	7	–	0
Tulane		–		–		4	–	7	–	0
Louisville		–		–		3	–	8	–	0
Navy		–		–		3	–	8	–	0
Rutgers		–		–		3	–	8	–	0
Army		–		–		2	–	9	–	0
Rankings from AP Poll

The 1983 Southwestern Louisiana Ragin' Cajuns football team was an American football team that represented the University of Southwestern Louisiana (now known as the University of Louisiana at Lafayette) as an independent during the 1983 NCAA Division I-A football season. In their fourth year under head coach Sam Robertson, the team compiled a 4–6 record.

== Schedule ==
Date	Opponent	Site	Result	Attendance	Source
September 10	at Northeast Louisiana	Malone Stadium; Monroe, LA (rivalry)	L 6–31	20,451	
September 17	Chattanooga	Cajun Field; Lafayette, LA	L 14–38	20,157	
September 24	at Rice	Rice Stadium; Houston, TX	L 21–22	10,000	
October 8	at East Carolina	Ficklen Memorial Stadium; Greenville, NC	L 18–21	27,345	
October 15	at Tulane	Louisiana Superdome; New Orleans, LA	L 15–17	26,980	
October 22	Lamar	Cajun Field; Lafayette, LA (rivalry)	W 31–6	17,431	
October 29	at Southern Miss	M. M. Roberts Stadium; Hattiesburg, MS	L 3–31	28,837	
November 12	McNeese State	Cajun Field; Lafayette, LA (Cajun Crown)	W 48–16		
November 19	Louisiana Tech	Cajun Field; Lafayette, LA (rivalry)	W 13–9	5,000	
November 26	at San Jose State	Spartan Stadium; San Jose, CA	W 25–21	9,221	
