= 1983 West Texas State Buffaloes football team =

American college football season

1983 West Texas State Buffaloes football
- Conference: Missouri Valley Conference
- Record: 0–10–1 (0–5–1 MVC)
- Head coach: Don Davis (2nd season)
- Offensive coordinator: Jack Welch (2nd season)
- Home stadium: Kimbrough Memorial Stadium

1983 Missouri Valley Conference football standings
	Conf.					Overall
Team	W		L		T	W		L		T
Tulsa $	5	–	0	–	0	8	–	3	–	0
No. 1 Southern Illinois ^	4	–	1	–	0	13	–	1	–	0
No. 5 Indiana State ^	3	–	2	–	0	9	–	4	–	0
New Mexico State	3	–	2	–	0	5	–	6	–	0
Illinois State	2	–	2	–	1	6	–	4	–	1
Wichita State	3	–	3	–	0	3	–	8	–	0
Drake	1	–	6	–	0	1	–	10	–	0
West Texas State	0	–	5	–	1	0	–	10	–	1
$ – Conference champion; ^ – NCAA Division I-AA playoff participant; The conference was a hybrid of NCAA Division I-A and I-AA programs. New Mexico State, Tulsa, and Wichita State were I-A and the other teams were I-AA.; Rankings from NCAA Division I-AA Football Committee poll

The 1983 West Texas State Buffaloes football team was an American football team that represented West Texas State University—now known as West Texas A&M University—as a member of the Missouri Valley Conference (MVC) during the 1983 NCAA Division I-AA football season. In their second year under head coach Don Davis, the Buffaloes compiled am overall record of 0–10–1 with a mark of 0–5–1 in conference play, and placing last out of eight teams in the MVC.

== Schedule ==
Date	Opponent	Site	Result	Attendance	Source
September 3	at North Texas State*	Fouts Field; Denton, TX	L 3–32	10,300	
September 10	Abilene Christian*	Kimbrough Memorial Stadium; Canyon, TX	L 3–28		
September 17	at McNeese State*	Cowboy Stadium; Lake Charles, LA	L 0–17	21,621	
September 24	UT Arlington*	Kimbrough Memorial Stadium; Canyon, TX	L 13–31	8,478	
October 1	Angelo State*	Kimbrough Memorial Stadium; Canyon, TX	L 3–10		
October 8	Illinois State^{†}	Kimbrough Memorial Stadium; Canyon, TX	T 24–24		
October 22	at Wichita State	Cessna Stadium; Wichita, KS	L 30–31	5,711	
October 29	at Drake	Drake Stadium; Des Moines, IN	L 26–36	1,900	
November 5	No. 15 Indiana State	Kimbrough Memorial Stadium; Canyon, TX	L 20–31	2,516	
November 12	at Tulsa	Skelly Stadium; Tulsa, OK	L 16–31	22,318	
November 19	at New Mexico State	Aggie Memorial Stadium; Las Cruces, NM	L 24–26		
*Non-conference game; ^{†}Homecoming; Rankings from NCAA Division I-AA Football Committee Poll released prior to the game
