= 1983 Hawaii Rainbow Warriors football team =

American college football season

1983 Hawaii Rainbow Warriors football
- Conference: Western Athletic Conference
- Record: 5–5–1 (3–3–1 WAC)
- Head coach: Dick Tomey (7th season)
- Home stadium: Aloha Stadium

1983 Western Athletic Conference football standings
	Conf.					Overall
Team	W		L		T	W		L		T
No. 7 BYU $	7	–	0	–	0	11	–	1	–	0
No. 13 Air Force	5	–	2	–	0	10	–	2	–	0
Wyoming	5	–	3	–	0	7	–	5	–	0
New Mexico	4	–	3	–	0	6	–	6	–	0
Hawaii	3	–	3	–	1	5	–	5	–	1
Utah	4	–	4	–	0	5	–	6	–	0
Colorado State	4	–	4	–	0	5	–	7	–	0
San Diego State	1	–	6	–	1	2	–	9	–	1
UTEP	0	–	8	–	0	2	–	10	–	0
$ – Conference champion; Rankings from AP Poll

The 1983 Hawaii Rainbow Warriors football team represented the University of Hawaiʻi at Mānoa in the Western Athletic Conference during the 1983 NCAA Division I-A football season. In their seventh season under head coach Dick Tomey, the Rainbow Warriors compiled a 5–5–1 record.

== Schedule ==
Date	Opponent	Site	Result	Attendance	Source
September 10	Colorado State	Aloha Stadium; Halawa, HI	W 34–0	43,266	
September 17	Long Beach State*	Aloha Stadium; Halawa, HI	L 21–23	46,350	
September 24	at Utah	Robert Rice Stadium; Salt Lake City, UT	L 25–28	30,258	
October 1	San Diego State	Aloha Stadium; Halawa, HI	T 27–27	34,153	
October 15	at UNLV*	Las Vegas Silver Bowl; Whitney, NV	W 23–0	16,520	
October 22	New Mexico^{†}	Aloha Stadium; Halawa, HI	W 25–16	47,799	
October 29	UTEP	Aloha Stadium; Halawa, HI	W 25–24	40,785	
November 5	at Air Force	Falcon Stadium; Colorado Springs, CO (rivalry)	L 10–45	26,501	
November 19	Pacific (CA)*	Aloha Stadium; Halawa, HI	W 31–21	38,290	
November 26	Wyoming	Aloha Stadium; Halawa, HI (rivalry)	L 13–31	43,352	
December 3	Oklahoma*	Aloha Stadium; Halawa, HI	L 17–21	45,143	
*Non-conference game; ^{†}Homecoming
