= 1983 North Texas State Mean Green football team =

American college football season

1983 North Texas State Mean Green football

Southland co-champion

NCAA Division I-AA Quarterfinal, L 17–20 vs. Nevada
- Conference: Southland Conference
- Record: 8–4 (5–1 Southland)
- Head coach: Corky Nelson (2nd season)
- Home stadium: Fouts Field

1983 Southland Conference football standings
	Conf.					Overall
Team	W		L		T	W		L		T
No. 13 Northeast Louisiana +	5	–	1	–	0	8	–	3	–	0
No. 4 North Texas State +^	5	–	1	–	0	8	–	4	–	0
McNeese State	3	–	3	–	0	6	–	5	–	0
Arkansas State	3	–	3	–	0	5	–	5	–	1
UT Arlington	2	–	4	–	0	5	–	6	–	0
Louisiana Tech	2	–	4	–	0	4	–	7	–	0
Lamar	1	–	5	–	0	2	–	9	–	0
+ – Conference co-champions; ^ – NCAA Division I-AA playoff participant; Rankings from NCAA Division I-AA Football Committee poll

The 1983 North Texas State Mean Green football team was an American football team that represented North Texas State University (now known as the University of North Texas) during the 1983 NCAA Division I-AA football season as a member of the Southland Conference. In their second year under head coach Corky Nelson, the team compiled an 8–4 record.

== Schedule ==
Date	Opponent	Rank	Site	Result	Attendance	Source
September 3	West Texas State*		Fouts Field; Denton, TX	W 32–3	10,300	
September 10	at Oklahoma State*		Lewis Field; Stillwater, OK	L 13–20	44,700	
September 17	New Mexico State*		Fouts Field; Denton, TX	W 49–3		
September 24	at No. 2 (I-A) Texas*	No. 9	Texas Memorial Stadium; Austin, TX	L 6–26	71,202	
October 1	at New Mexico*	No. 16	University Stadium; Albuquerque, NM	W 18–8	21,048	
October 8	at Arkansas State	No. 13	War Memorial Stadium; Little Rock, AR	W 17–0	16,892	
October 15	at No. 11 McNeese State	No. 10	Cowboy Stadium; Lake Charles, LA	W 17–10	21,500	
October 29	Louisiana Tech	No. 5	Fouts Field; Denton, TX	L 18–25	12,100	
November 5	Lamar^{†}	No. 12	Fouts Field; Denton, TX	W 10–0		
November 12	at No. 2 Northeast Louisiana	No. 10	Malone Stadium; Monroe, LA	W 27–7	17,452	
November 19	UT Arlington	No. 5	Fouts Field; Denton, TX	W 52–15	11,400	
December 3	at No. 11 Nevada*	No. 4	Mackay Stadium; Reno, NV (NCAA Division I-AA Quarterfinal)	L 17–20 ^{OT}	7,878	
*Non-conference game; ^{†}Homecoming; Rankings from NCAA Division I-AA Football Committee Poll released prior to the game
