= 1983 Wyoming Cowboys football team =

American college football season

1983 Wyoming Cowboys football
- Conference: Western Athletic Conference
- Record: 7–5 (5–3 WAC)
- Head coach: Al Kincaid (3rd season)
- Captains: Walt Goffigan; Brad Baumberger; Steve Nighswonger
- Home stadium: War Memorial Stadium

1983 Western Athletic Conference football standings
	Conf.					Overall
Team	W		L		T	W		L		T
No. 7 BYU $	7	–	0	–	0	11	–	1	–	0
No. 13 Air Force	5	–	2	–	0	10	–	2	–	0
Wyoming	5	–	3	–	0	7	–	5	–	0
New Mexico	4	–	3	–	0	6	–	6	–	0
Hawaii	3	–	3	–	1	5	–	5	–	1
Utah	4	–	4	–	0	5	–	6	–	0
Colorado State	4	–	4	–	0	5	–	7	–	0
San Diego State	1	–	6	–	1	2	–	9	–	1
UTEP	0	–	8	–	0	2	–	10	–	0
$ – Conference champion; Rankings from AP Poll

The 1983 Wyoming Cowboys football team represented the University of Wyoming as a member of the Western Athletic Conference (WAC) during the 1983 NCAA Division I-A football season. Led by third-year head coach Al Kincaid, the Cowboys compiled a 7-5 record (5-3 against conference opponents), and finished third in the WAC. The team played home games at War Memorial Stadium in Laramie, Wyoming.

== Schedule ==
Date	Opponent	Site	Result	Attendance	Source
September 3	South Dakota*	War Memorial Stadium; Laramie, WY	W 34–13	17,340	
September 10	at No. 1 Nebraska*	Memorial Stadium; Lincoln, NE	L 20–56	76,016	
September 17	Air Force	War Memorial Stadium; Laramie, WY	W 14–7	30,194	
September 24	at Kansas State*	KSU Stadium; Manhattan, KS	L 25–27	36,700	
October 1	UTEP^{†}	War Memorial Stadium; Laramie, WY	W 49–17	21,127	
October 8	No. 20 BYU	War Memorial Stadium; Laramie, WY	L 10–41	31,084	
October 15	at Utah	Robert Rice Stadium; Salt Lake City, UT	L 14–69	19,121	
October 22	No. 13 (I-AA) Colgate*	War Memorial Stadium; Laramie, WY	W 49–29	14,989	
November 5	at New Mexico	University Stadium; Albuquerque, NM	L 10–17	19,109	
November 12	at San Diego State	Jack Murphy Stadium; San Diego, CA	W 33–21	14,530	
November 19	Colorado State	War Memorial Stadium; Laramie, WY	W 42–17	15,551	
November 26	at Hawaii	Aloha Stadium; Halawa, HI (rivalry)	W 31–13	43,352	
*Non-conference game; ^{†}Homecoming; Rankings from AP Poll released prior to the game
