= 1983 Louisiana Tech Bulldogs football team =

American college football season

1983 Louisiana Tech Bulldogs football
- Conference: Southland Conference
- Record: 4–7 (2–4 Southland)
- Head coach: A. L. Williams (1st season)
- Captains: Karl Terrebonne; Bonnie Ray Wilmer
- Home stadium: Joe Aillet Stadium

1983 Southland Conference football standings
	Conf.					Overall
Team	W		L		T	W		L		T
No. 13 Northeast Louisiana +	5	–	1	–	0	8	–	3	–	0
No. 4 North Texas State +^	5	–	1	–	0	8	–	4	–	0
McNeese State	3	–	3	–	0	6	–	5	–	0
Arkansas State	3	–	3	–	0	5	–	5	–	1
UT Arlington	2	–	4	–	0	5	–	6	–	0
Louisiana Tech	2	–	4	–	0	4	–	7	–	0
Lamar	1	–	5	–	0	2	–	9	–	0
+ – Conference co-champions; ^ – NCAA Division I-AA playoff participant; Rankings from NCAA Division I-AA Football Committee poll

The 1983 Louisiana Tech Bulldogs football team was an American football team that represented Louisiana Tech University as a member of the Southland Conference during the 1983 NCAA Division I-AA football season. In their first year under head coach A. L. Williams, the team compiled a 4–7 record. Williams was hired as head coach in December 1982 following the resignation of Billy Brewer who left to become head coach at Ole Miss.

== Schedule ==
Date	Opponent	Site	Result	Attendance	Source
September 10	at New Mexico State*	Aggie Memorial Stadium; Las Cruces, NM	L 7–15	15,302	
September 17	at Southern Miss*	M. M. Roberts Stadium; Hattiesburg, MS (Rivalry in Dixie)	L 10–28	28,342	
September 24	Lamar	Joe Aillet Stadium; Ruston, LA	L 12–18	16,200	
October 1	Chattanooga*	Joe Aillet Stadium; Ruston, LA	W 17–14	16,600	
October 8	No. 11 McNeese State	Joe Aillet Stadium; Ruston, LA	L 20–24	19,900	
October 15	at Arkansas State	Indian Stadium; Jonesboro, AR	L 7–21	14,288	
October 22	vs. Northwestern State*	Independence Stadium; Shreveport, LA (rivalry)	W 21–10	13,996	
October 29	at No. 5 North Texas State	Fouts Field; Denton, TX	W 25–18	12,100	
November 5	No. 3 Northeast Louisiana*	Joe Aillet Stadium; Ruston, LA (rivalry)	L 0–17	22,200	
November 12	at UT Arlington	Maverick Stadium; Arlington, TX	W 24–17	4,055	
November 19	at Southwestern Louisiana*	Cajun Field; Lafayette, LA (rivalry)	L 9–13	5,000	
*Non-conference game; Rankings from NCAA Division I-AA Football Committee Poll released prior to the game
