= 1983 Morehead State Eagles football team =

American college football season

1983 Morehead State Eagles football
- Conference: Ohio Valley Conference
- Record: 2–9 (1–6 OVC)
- Head coach: Steve Loney (3rd season)
- Home stadium: Jayne Stadium

1983 Ohio Valley Conference football standings
	Conf.					Overall
Team	W		L		T	W		L		T
No. 8 Eastern Kentucky $^	6	–	1	–	0	7	–	2	–	1
No. 16 Middle Tennessee	5	–	2	–	0	8	–	2	–	0
Akron	5	–	2	–	0	8	–	3	–	0
Murray State	4	–	3	–	0	7	–	4	–	0
Austin Peay	3	–	4	–	0	6	–	5	–	0
Youngstown State	2	–	5	–	0	4	–	7	–	0
Tennessee Tech	2	–	5	–	0	2	–	8	–	0
Morehead State	1	–	6	–	0	2	–	9	–	0
$ – Conference champion; ^ – NCAA Division I-AA playoff participant; Rankings from NCAA Division I-AA Football Committee poll

The 1983 Morehead State Eagles football team represented Morehead State University as a member of the Ohio Valley Conference (OVC) during the 1983 NCAA Division I-AA football season. Led by third-year head coach Steve Loney, the Eagles compiled an overall record of 2–9, with a mark of 1–6 in conference play, and finished eighth in the OVC.

== Schedule ==
Date	Opponent	Site	Result	Attendance	Source
September 10	at Kentucky State*	Alumni Field; Frankfort, KY	L 3–7		
September 17	Marshall*	Jayne Stadium; Morehead, KY	L 0–35	9,100	
September 24	Middle Tennessee	Jayne Stadium; Morehead, KY	L 17–56	2,500	
October 1	at Murray State	Roy Stewart Stadium; Murray, KY	L 0–38		
October 8	Austin Peay	Jayne Stadium; Morehead, KY	L 3–14		
October 15	Akron	Jayne Stadium; Morehead, KY	L 0–31	6,000	
October 22	at Tennessee Tech	Tucker Stadium; Cookeville, TN	L 3–14	5,384	
October 29	at Western Kentucky*	L. T. Smith Stadium; Bowling Green, KY	L 7–38	14,500	
November 5	Liberty Baptist*	Jayne Stadium; Morehead, KY	W 24–16	1,800	
November 12	No. 5 Eastern Kentucky	Jayne Stadium; Morehead, KY (rivalry)	L 0–56		
November 19	at Youngstown State	Stambaugh Stadium; Youngstown, OH	W 27–20		
*Non-conference game; Rankings from NCAA Division I-AA Football Committee Poll released prior to the game
