= 1983 Middle Tennessee Blue Raiders football team =

American college football season

1983 Middle Tennessee Blue Raiders football
- Conference: Ohio Valley Conference
- Record: 8–2 (5–2 OVC)
- Head coach: Boots Donnelly (5th season)
- Home stadium: Johnny "Red" Floyd Stadium

1983 Ohio Valley Conference football standings
| | Conf. | | | | | Overall |
| Team | W | | L | | T | W | | L | | T |
|---|---|---|---|---|---|---|---|---|---|---|
| No. 8 Eastern Kentucky $^ | 6 | – | 1 | – | 0 | 7 | – | 2 | – | 1 |
| No. 16 Middle Tennessee | 5 | – | 2 | – | 0 | 8 | – | 2 | – | 0 |
| Akron | 5 | – | 2 | – | 0 | 8 | – | 3 | – | 0 |
| Murray State | 4 | – | 3 | – | 0 | 7 | – | 4 | – | 0 |
| Austin Peay | 3 | – | 4 | – | 0 | 6 | – | 5 | – | 0 |
| Youngstown State | 2 | – | 5 | – | 0 | 4 | – | 7 | – | 0 |
| Tennessee Tech | 2 | – | 5 | – | 0 | 2 | – | 8 | – | 0 |
| Morehead State | 1 | – | 6 | – | 0 | 2 | – | 9 | – | 0 |
$ – Conference champion; ^ – NCAA Division I-AA playoff participant; Rankings from NCAA Division I-AA Football Committee poll

The 1983 Middle Tennessee Blue Raiders football team represented Middle Tennessee State University in the 1983 NCAA Division I-AA football season

== Schedule ==
| Date | Opponent | Rank | Site | Result | Attendance | Source |
|---|---|---|---|---|---|---|
| September 3 | Savannah State* | | Johnny "Red" Floyd Stadium; Murfreesboro, TN | W 51–0 | 8,500 | |
| September 17 | at Tennessee–Martin* | | Pacer Stadium; Martin, TN | W 39–3 | | |
| September 24 | at Morehead State | | Jayne Stadium; Morehead, KY | W 56–17 | 2,500 | |
| October 1 | at No. 12 Akron | | Rubber Bowl; Akron, OH | W 26–3 | 10,214 | |
| October 8 | No. 1 Eastern Kentucky | No. 17 | Johnny "Red" Floyd Stadium; Murfreesboro, TN | L 7–14 | | |
| October 15 | Murray State | No. 15 | Johnny "Red" Floyd Stadium; Murfreesboro, TN | W 17–14 | 11,000 | |
| October 22 | at Austin Peay | No. 11 | Municipal Stadium; Clarksville, TN | W 31–17 | 4,000 | |
| October 29 | Youngstown State | No. 9 | Johnny "Red" Floyd Stadium; Murfreesboro, TN | W 35–24 | 5,500 | |
| November 5 | Western Kentucky* | No. T–5 | Johnny "Red" Floyd Stadium; Murfreesboro, TN (rivalry) | W 26–7 | 5,500 | |
| November 19 | Tennessee Tech | No. T–7 | Johnny "Red" Floyd Stadium; Murfreesboro, TN | L 8–12 | 10,500 | |
*Non-conference game; Rankings from NCAA Division I-AA Football Committee Poll released prior to the game
