= 1983 Eastern Kentucky Colonels football team =

American college football season

1983 Eastern Kentucky Colonels football

OVC champion

NCAA Division I-AA First Round, L 20–24 at Boston University
- Conference: Ohio Valley Conference
- Record: 7–3–1 (6–1 OVC)
- Head coach: Roy Kidd (20th season)
- Home stadium: Hanger Field

1983 Ohio Valley Conference football standings
	Conf.					Overall
Team	W		L		T	W		L		T
No. 8 Eastern Kentucky $^	6	–	1	–	0	7	–	2	–	1
No. 16 Middle Tennessee	5	–	2	–	0	8	–	2	–	0
Akron	5	–	2	–	0	8	–	3	–	0
Murray State	4	–	3	–	0	7	–	4	–	0
Austin Peay	3	–	4	–	0	6	–	5	–	0
Youngstown State	2	–	5	–	0	4	–	7	–	0
Tennessee Tech	2	–	5	–	0	2	–	8	–	0
Morehead State	1	–	6	–	0	2	–	9	–	0
$ – Conference champion; ^ – NCAA Division I-AA playoff participant; Rankings from NCAA Division I-AA Football Committee poll

The 1983 Eastern Kentucky Colonels football team represented Eastern Kentucky University as a member of the Ohio Valley Conference (OVC) during the 1983 NCAA Division I-AA football season. Led by 20th-year head coach Roy Kidd, the Colonels compiled an overall record of 7–3–1, with a mark of 6–1 in conference play, and finished as OVC champion. Eastern Kentucky advanced to the NCAA Division I-AA First Round and were defeated by Boston University.

== Schedule ==
Date	Opponent	Rank	Site	Result	Attendance	Source
September 3	East Tennessee State*		Hanger Field; Richmond, KY	W 21–15	9,200	
September 10	at Youngstown State		Stambaugh Stadium; Youngstown, OH	W 28–23	13,349	
September 24	Akron	No. 3	Hanger Field; Richmond, KY	W 10–5	14,600	
October 1	Austin Peay	No. T–1	Hanger Field; Richmond, KY	W 31–14	19,200	
October 8	at No. 17 Middle Tennessee	No. 1	Johnny "Red" Floyd Stadium; Murfreesboro, TN	W 14–7		
October 22	Western Kentucky*	No. 1	Hanger Field; Richmond, KY (rivalry)	T 10–10	8,700	
October 29	at Murray State	No. 3	Roy Stewart Stadium; Murray, KY	L 10–23		
November 5	Tennessee Tech	No. T–5	Hanger Field; Richmond, KY	W 24–7		
November 12	at Morehead State	No. 5	Jayne Stadium; Morehead, KY (rivalry)	W 56–0		
November 19	at Florida A&M*	No. 4	Bragg Memorial Stadium; Tallahassee, FL	L 10–35	6,427	
November 27	at No. T–13 Boston University*	No. 8	Hanger Field; Richmond, KY (NCAA Division I-AA First Round)	L 20–24	4,800	
*Non-conference game; Rankings from NCAA Division I-AA Football Committee Poll released prior to the game
