= 1983 Austin Peay Governors football team =

American college football season

1983 Austin Peay Governors football
- Conference: Ohio Valley Conference
- Record: 6–5 (3–4 OVC)
- Head coach: Emory Hale (3rd season)
- Home stadium: Municipal Stadium

1983 Ohio Valley Conference football standings
	Conf.					Overall
Team	W		L		T	W		L		T
No. 8 Eastern Kentucky $^	6	–	1	–	0	7	–	2	–	1
No. 16 Middle Tennessee	5	–	2	–	0	8	–	2	–	0
Akron	5	–	2	–	0	8	–	3	–	0
Murray State	4	–	3	–	0	7	–	4	–	0
Austin Peay	3	–	4	–	0	6	–	5	–	0
Youngstown State	2	–	5	–	0	4	–	7	–	0
Tennessee Tech	2	–	5	–	0	2	–	8	–	0
Morehead State	1	–	6	–	0	2	–	9	–	0
$ – Conference champion; ^ – NCAA Division I-AA playoff participant; Rankings from NCAA Division I-AA Football Committee poll

The 1983 Austin Peay Governors football team represented Austin Peay State University as a member of the Ohio Valley Conference (OVC) during the 1983 NCAA Division I-AA football season. Led by third-year head coach Emory Hale, the Governors compiled an overall record of 6–5, with a mark of 3–4 in conference play, and finished fifth in the OVC.

== Schedule ==
Date	Opponent	Site	Result	Attendance	Source
September 10	at Tennessee–Martin*	Pacer Stadium; Martin, TN	W 45–6		
September 17	Kentucky State*	Municipal Stadium; Clarksville, TN	W 20–14	6,000	
September 24	Western Kentucky*	Municipal Stadium; Clarksville, TN	W 13–3	7,500	
October 1	at No. T–1 Eastern Kentucky	Hanger Field; Richmond, KY	L 14–31	19,200	
October 8	at Morehead State	Jayne Stadium; Morehead, KY	W 14–3		
October 15	at Youngstown State	Stambaugh Stadium; Youngstown, OH	L 19–41		
October 22	No. 11 Middle Tennessee	Municipal Stadium; Clarksville, TN	L 17–31	4,000	
October 29	UCF*	Municipal Stadium; Clarksville, TN	L 7–10	7,000	
November 5	Murray State	Municipal Stadium; Clarksville, TN	W 17–16	4,000	
November 12	at Tennessee Tech	Tucker Stadium; Cookeville, TN	W 21–7	2,500	
November 19	Akron	Municipal Stadium; Clarksville, TN	L 3–26		
*Non-conference game; Rankings from NCAA Division I-AA Football Committee Poll released prior to the game
