= 1983 Arkansas State Indians football team =

American college football season

1983 Arkansas State Indians football
- Conference: Southland Conference
- Record: 5–5–1 (3–3 Southland)
- Head coach: Larry Lacewell (5th season)
- Home stadium: Indian Stadium

1983 Southland Conference football standings
	Conf.					Overall
Team	W		L		T	W		L		T
No. 13 Northeast Louisiana +	5	–	1	–	0	8	–	3	–	0
No. 4 North Texas State +^	5	–	1	–	0	8	–	4	–	0
McNeese State	3	–	3	–	0	6	–	5	–	0
Arkansas State	3	–	3	–	0	5	–	5	–	1
UT Arlington	2	–	4	–	0	5	–	6	–	0
Louisiana Tech	2	–	4	–	0	4	–	7	–	0
Lamar	1	–	5	–	0	2	–	9	–	0
+ – Conference co-champions; ^ – NCAA Division I-AA playoff participant; Rankings from NCAA Division I-AA Football Committee poll

The 1983 Arkansas State Indians football team represented Arkansas State University as a member of the Southland Conference during the 1983 NCAA Division I-AA football season. Led by fifth-year head coach Larry Lacewell, the Indians compiled an overall record of 5–5–1 with a mark of 3–2 in conference play, tying for third place in the Southland.

== Schedule ==
Date	Opponent	Site	Result	Attendance	Source
September 3	Tennessee–Martin*	Indian Stadium; Jonesboro, AR	W 31–0	12,748	
September 10	at Chattanooga*	Chamberlain Field; Chattanooga, TN	W 27–14	9,721	
September 17	at Texas A&M*	Kyle Field; College Station, TX	L 0–38	50,064	
September 24	at No. 14 Northeast Louisiana	Malone Stadium; Monroe, LA	L 7–45		
October 1	No. 5 Southern Illinois*	Indian Stadium; Jonesboro, AR	L 28–35	10,281	
October 8	vs. No. 13 North Texas State	War Memorial Stadium; Little Rock, AR	L 0–17	16,892	
October 15	Louisiana Tech^{†}	Indian Stadium; Jonesboro, AR	W 21–7	14,288	
October 22	at No. T–18 McNeese State	Cowboy Stadium; Lake Charles, LA	W 24–14		
October 29	UT Arlington	Indian Stadium; Jonesboro, AR	L 19–28	15,639	
November 12	at Lamar	Cardinal Stadium; Beaumont, TX	W 24–14		
November 19	at Memphis State*	Liberty Bowl Memorial Stadium; Memphis, TN (rivalry)	T 14–14	28,130	
*Non-conference game; ^{†}Homecoming; Rankings from NCAA Division I-AA Football Committee Poll released prior to the game
