= 1983 Tennessee Tech Golden Eagles football team =

American college football season

1983 Tennessee Tech Golden Eagles football
- Conference: Ohio Valley Conference
- Record: 2–8 (2–5 OVC)
- Head coach: Gary Darnell (1st season)
- Offensive coordinator: Dennis Franchione (1st season)
- Home stadium: Tucker Stadium

1983 Ohio Valley Conference football standings
	Conf.					Overall
Team	W		L		T	W		L		T
No. 8 Eastern Kentucky $^	6	–	1	–	0	7	–	2	–	1
No. 16 Middle Tennessee	5	–	2	–	0	8	–	2	–	0
Akron	5	–	2	–	0	8	–	3	–	0
Murray State	4	–	3	–	0	7	–	4	–	0
Austin Peay	3	–	4	–	0	6	–	5	–	0
Youngstown State	2	–	5	–	0	4	–	7	–	0
Tennessee Tech	2	–	5	–	0	2	–	8	–	0
Morehead State	1	–	6	–	0	2	–	9	–	0
$ – Conference champion; ^ – NCAA Division I-AA playoff participant; Rankings from NCAA Division I-AA Football Committee poll

The 1983 Tennessee Tech Golden Eagles football team represented Tennessee Technological University (commonly referred to as Tennessee Tech) as a member of the Ohio Valley Conference (OVC) during the 1983 NCAA Division I-AA football season. Led by first-year head coach Gary Darnell, the Golden Eagles compiled an overall record of 2–8, with a mark of 2–5 in conference play, and finished tied for sixth in the OVC.

== Schedule ==
Date	Opponent	Site	Result	Attendance	Source
September 10	at East Tennessee State*	Memorial Center; Johnson City, TN	L 7–14	8,253	
September 17	Youngstown State	Tucker Stadium; Cookeville, TN	L 22–34		
September 24	at Murray State	Roy Stewart Stadium; Murray, KY	L 6–20	8,556	
October 8	Western Carolina*	Tucker Stadium; Cookeville, TN	L 10–42	11,308	
October 15	at Western Kentucky*	L. T. Smith Stadium; Bowling Green, KY	L 0–17	9,000	
October 22	Morehead State	Tucker Stadium; Cookeville, TN	W 14–3	5,384	
October 29	Akron	Tucker Stadium; Cookeville, TN	L 12–43	4,119	
November 5	at No. T–5 Eastern Kentucky	Hanger Field; Richmond, KY	L 7–24		
November 12	Austin Peay	Tucker Stadium; Cookeville, TN	L 7–21	2,500	
November 19	at No. T–7 Middle Tennessee	Johnny "Red" Floyd Stadium; Murfreesboro, TN	W 12–8	10,500	
*Non-conference game; Rankings from NCAA Division I-AA Football Committee Poll released prior to the game
