= 1983 Western Illinois Leathernecks football team =

American college football season

1983 Western Illinois Leathernecks football
- Conference: Association of Mid-Continent Universities
- Record: 3–8 (0–3 Mid-Con)
- Head coach: Bruce Craddock (1st season)
- Home stadium: Hanson Field

1983 Association of Mid-Continent Universities football standings
	Conf.					Overall
Team	W		L		T	W		L		T
No. 6 Eastern Illinois $^	3	–	0	–	0	9	–	3	–	0
Southwest Missouri State	2	–	1	–	0	6	–	5	–	0
Northern Iowa	1	–	2	–	0	6	–	5	–	0
Western Illinois	0	–	3	–	0	3	–	8	–	0
$ – Conference champion; ^ – NCAA Division I-AA playoff participant; Rankings from NCAA Division I-AA Football Committee poll

The 1983 Western Illinois Leathernecks football team represented Western Illinois University as a member of the Association of Mid-Continent Universities (Mid-Con) during the 1983 NCAA Division I-AA football season. Led by first-year head coach Bruce Craddock, the Leathernecks compiled an overall record of 3–8, with a mark of 0–3 in conference play, and finished fourth in the Mid-Con.

== Schedule ==
Date	Opponent	Site	Result	Attendance	Source
September 3	Southern Illinois*	Hanson Field; Macomb, IL	L 6–38	8,893	
September 10	Southwest Missouri State	Hanson Field; Macomb, IL	L 9–21	5,739	
September 17	Drake*	Hanson Field; Macomb, IL	W 31–14	6,039	
September 24	at Youngstown State*	Stambaugh Stadium; Youngstown, OH	L 14–42		
October 1	Northern Iowa	Hanson Field; Macomb, IL	L 26–32	5,601	
October 8	at Central Missouri State*	Kennedy Field; Warrensburg, MO	W 26–19		
October 15	Wisconsin–Whitewater*	Hanson Field; Macomb, IL	W 28–14		
October 22	at No. T–9 Eastern Illinois	O'Brien Stadium; Charleston, IL	L 0–20		
October 29	at Illinois State*	Hancock Stadium; Normal, IL	L 7–45	9,096	
November 5	Northern Michigan*	Hanson Field; Macomb, IL	L 14–47		
November 12	at Winona State*	Maxwell Field; Winona, MN	L 30–35		
*Non-conference game; Rankings from NCAA Division I-AA Football Committee Poll released prior to the game
