= 1983 Northeast Louisiana Indians football team =

American college football season

1983 Northeast Louisiana Indians football

SLC co-champion
- Conference: Southland Conference

Ranking
- Coaches: No. 13
- Record: 8–3 (5–1 SLC)
- Head coach: Pat Collins (3rd season)
- Home stadium: Malone Stadium

1983 Southland Conference football standings
	Conf.					Overall
Team	W		L		T	W		L		T
No. 13 Northeast Louisiana +	5	–	1	–	0	8	–	3	–	0
No. 4 North Texas State +^	5	–	1	–	0	8	–	4	–	0
McNeese State	3	–	3	–	0	6	–	5	–	0
Arkansas State	3	–	3	–	0	5	–	5	–	1
UT Arlington	2	–	4	–	0	5	–	6	–	0
Louisiana Tech	2	–	4	–	0	4	–	7	–	0
Lamar	1	–	5	–	0	2	–	9	–	0
+ – Conference co-champions; ^ – NCAA Division I-AA playoff participant; Rankings from NCAA Division I-AA Football Committee poll

The 1983 Northeast Louisiana Indians football team was an American football team that represented Northeast Louisiana University (now known as the University of Louisiana at Monroe) in the Southland Conference during the 1983 NCAA Division I-AA football season. In their third year under head coach Pat Collins, the team compiled a 8–3 record and as Southland Conference co-champions. The Indians offense scored 251 points while the defense allowed 119 points.

== Schedule ==
Date	Opponent	Rank	Site	Result	Attendance	Source
September 3	at Indiana State*		Memorial Stadium; Terre Haute, IN	L 9–10	8,131	
September 10	Southwestern Louisiana*		Malone Stadium; Monroe, LA	W 31–6	20,451	
September 17	at UT Arlington		Maverick Stadium; Arlington, TX	W 16–10	7,338	
September 24	Arkansas State	No. 14	Malone Stadium; Monroe, LA	W 45–7		
October 8	at Lamar	No. 9	Cardinal Stadium; Beaumont, TX	W 17–0		
October 15	Nicholls State*	No. 8	Malone Stadium; Monroe, LA	W 47–27		
October 22	at Southeastern Louisiana*	No. 6	Strawberry Stadium; Hammond, LA	W 16–13		
October 29	McNeese State	No. 4	Malone Stadium; Monroe, LA	W 37–6		
November 5	at Louisiana Tech	No. 3	Joe Aillet Stadium; Ruston, LA	W 17–0	22,200	
November 12	No. 10 North Texas State	No. 2	Malone Stadium; Monroe, LA	L 7–27	17,452	
November 19	at Northwestern State*	No. T–7	Harry Turpin Stadium; Natchitoches, LA	L 9–13		
*Non-conference game; Rankings from NCAA Division I-AA Football Committee Poll released prior to the game
