= 1983 BYU Cougars football team =

American college football season

1983 BYU Cougars football

WAC champion Holiday Bowl champion

Holiday Bowl, W 21–17 vs. Missouri
- Conference: Western Athletic Conference

Ranking
- Coaches: No. 7
- AP: No. 7
- Record: 11–1 (7–0 WAC)
- Head coach: LaVell Edwards (12th season)
- Offensive coordinator: Roger French (3rd season)
- Offensive scheme: West Coast
- Defensive coordinator: Dick Felt (9th season)
- Base defense: 4–3
- Home stadium: Cougar Stadium

1983 Western Athletic Conference football standings
	Conf.					Overall
Team	W		L		T	W		L		T
No. 7 BYU $	7	–	0	–	0	11	–	1	–	0
No. 13 Air Force	5	–	2	–	0	10	–	2	–	0
Wyoming	5	–	3	–	0	7	–	5	–	0
New Mexico	4	–	3	–	0	6	–	6	–	0
Hawaii	3	–	3	–	1	5	–	5	–	1
Utah	4	–	4	–	0	5	–	6	–	0
Colorado State	4	–	4	–	0	5	–	7	–	0
San Diego State	1	–	6	–	1	2	–	9	–	1
UTEP	0	–	8	–	0	2	–	10	–	0
$ – Conference champion; Rankings from AP Poll

The 1983 BYU Cougars football team represented the Brigham Young University (BYU) in the 1983 NCAA Division I-A football season as a member of the Western Athletic Conference (WAC). The team was led by head coach LaVell Edwards, in his twelfth year, and played their home games at Cougar Stadium in Provo, Utah. They finished the season with a record of eleven wins and one loss (11–1, 7–0 WAC), and with a victory over Missouri in the Holiday Bowl. The Cougars offense scored 505 points while the defense allowed 247 points.

== Schedule ==
Date	Opponent	Rank	Site	Result	Attendance	Source
September 10	at Baylor*		Baylor Stadium; Waco, TX	L 36–40	32,500	
September 17	Bowling Green*		Cougar Stadium; Provo, UT	W 63–28	64,659	
September 24	at Air Force		Falcon Stadium; Colorado Springs, CO	W 46–28	34,255	
October 1	at UCLA*		Rose Bowl; Pasadena, CA	W 37–35	50,044	
October 8	at Wyoming	No. 20	War Memorial Stadium; Laramie, WY	W 41–10	31,084	
October 15	New Mexico	No. 20	Cougar Stadium; Provo, UT	W 66–21	64,740	
October 22	at San Diego State	No. 18	Jack Murphy Stadium; San Diego, CA	W 47–12	20,515	
October 29	Utah State*	No. 15	Cougar Stadium; Provo, UT (Beehive Boot)	W 38–34	64,593	
November 5	at UTEP	No. 12	Sun Bowl; El Paso, TX	W 31–9	15,487	
November 12	Colorado State	No. 8	Cougar Stadium; Provo, UT	W 24–6	64,651	
November 19	Utah	No. 9	Cougar Stadium; Provo, UT (Holy War)	W 55–7	65,215	
December 23	vs. Missouri*	No. 9	Jack Murphy Stadium; San Diego, CA (Holiday Bowl)	W 21–17	51,480	
*Non-conference game; Rankings from AP Poll released prior to the game

== Game summaries ==
=== Utah ===
Team	1	2	3	4	Total
Utah	0	7	0	0	7
• BYU	14	21	20	0	55

- Date: November 19
- Location: Cougar Stadium, Provo, Utah

Scoring summary
1	BYU	Stinnett 3 yard run (Johnson kick)	BYU 7-0
1	BYU	Kozlowski 5 yard pass from Young (Johnson kick)	BYU 14-0
2	UTAH	Parker 6 yard pass from Stevens (Guardi kick)	BYU 14-7
2	BYU	Harper 1 yard pass from Young (Johnson kick)	BYU 21-7
2	BYU	Tiumalu 13 yard pass from Young (Johnson kick)	BYU 28-7
2	BYU	Harper 16 yard pass from Young (Johnson kick)	BYU 35-7
3	BYU	Stinnett 10 yard run (Johnson kick)	BYU 42-7
3	BYU	Hamilton 33 yard pass from Young (Johnson kick)	BYU 49-7
3	BYU	Pendleton 6 yard pass from Young (kick failed)	BYU 55-7

== Roster ==
1983 BYU Cougars football team roster
Players
Coaches
Offense

Pos.	#	Name	Class
G, C	57	Robert Anae	Jr
QB	6	Robbie Bosco	So
TE	95	Gordon Hudson	Sr
C	50	Trevor Matich	Jr
RB	20	Casey Tiumalu	Sr
QB	8	Steve Young	Sr

Defense

Pos.	#	Name	Class
DE	92	Jim Herrmann	Jr
DT	77	Shawn Knight	Fr
LB	54	Cary Whittingham	So

Special teams

Pos.	#	Name	Class
P/K	10	Lee Johnson	Jr

Head coach

- LaVell Edwards

Coordinators/assistant coaches

- Jim Paronto
  (Inside linebackers coach)

Legend

- (C) Team captain
- (S) Suspended
- (I) Ineligible
- Injured
- Redshirt

Roster

== Awards and honors ==
- Rex Burningham: Honorable mention All-American, first-team All-WAC
- Craig Garrick: Second-team All-WAC
- Brandon Flint: Honorable mention All-American, first-team All-WAC
- Jim Herrmann: Second-team All-WAC
- Gordon Hudson: Consensus All-American, first-team All-WAC
- Doug Kellermeyer: Second-team All-WAC
- Kyle Morrell: Second-team All-WAC
- Kirk Pendleton: Second-team All-WAC
- Todd Shell: Honorable mention All-American, first-team All-WAC
- Casey Tiumalu: Honorable mention All-American, first-team All-WAC
- Jon Young: Honorable mention All-American, first-team All-WAC
- Steve Young: Sammy Baugh Trophy, Davey O'Brien Award, consensus All-American, first-team All-WAC

== Team players in the NFL ==
The following were selected in the 1984 NFL draft.

Player	Position	Round	Overall	NFL team
Todd Shell	Linebacker	1	24	San Francisco 49ers
Kirk Pendleton	Wide receiver	11	304	Atlanta Falcons

The following were selected in the 1984 NFL supplemental draft of USFL and CFL players.

Player	Position	Round	Overall	NFL team
Steve Young	Quarterback	1	1	Tampa Bay Buccaneers
Gordon Hudson	Tight end	1	22	Seattle Seahawks
