= 1983 Tulsa Golden Hurricane football team =

American college football season

1983 Tulsa Golden Hurricane football

MVC champion
- Conference: Missouri Valley Conference
- Record: 8–3 (5–0 MVC)
- Head coach: John Cooper (7th season)
- Offensive coordinator: Joe Hollis (1st season)
- Defensive coordinator: Bill Young (1st season)
- Home stadium: Skelly Stadium

1983 Missouri Valley Conference football standings
	Conf.					Overall
Team	W		L		T	W		L		T
Tulsa $	5	–	0	–	0	8	–	3	–	0
No. 1 Southern Illinois ^	4	–	1	–	0	13	–	1	–	0
No. 5 Indiana State ^	3	–	2	–	0	9	–	4	–	0
New Mexico State	3	–	2	–	0	5	–	6	–	0
Illinois State	2	–	2	–	1	6	–	4	–	1
Wichita State	3	–	3	–	0	3	–	8	–	0
Drake	1	–	6	–	0	1	–	10	–	0
West Texas State	0	–	5	–	1	0	–	10	–	1
$ – Conference champion; ^ – NCAA Division I-AA playoff participant; The conference was a hybrid of NCAA Division I-A and I-AA programs. New Mexico State, Tulsa, and Wichita State were I-A and the other teams were I-AA.; Rankings from NCAA Division I-AA Football Committee poll

The 1983 Tulsa Golden Hurricane football team represented the University of Tulsa during the 1983 NCAA Division I-A football season. In their seventh year under head coach John Cooper, the Golden Hurricane compiled an 8–3 record (5–0 against conference opponents) and won the Missouri Valley Conference championship.

The team's statistical leaders included Steve Gage with 876 passing yards, Michael Gunter with 1,198 rushing yards, and John Green with 365 yards. Head coach John Cooper was later inducted into the College Football Hall of Fame.

== Schedule ==
Date	Opponent	Site	Result	Attendance	Source
September 3	San Diego State*	Skelly Stadium; Tulsa, OK	W 34–9	25,429	
September 10	at Arkansas*	Razorback Stadium; Fayetteville, AR	L 14–17	45,202	
September 17	Northwestern State*	Skelly Stadium; Tulsa, OK	W 26–19	20,193	
September 24	at No. 8 Oklahoma*	Oklahoma Memorial Stadium; Norman, OK	L 18–28	75,500	
October 1	at Oklahoma State*	Lewis Field; Stillwater, OK (rivalry)	L 0–9	49,500	
October 8	New Mexico State^{†}	Skelly Stadium; Tulsa, OK	W 24–10	16,098	
October 15	Illinois State	Skelly Stadium; Tulsa, OK	W 39–25	21,107	
October 22	at Texas Tech*	Jones Stadium; Lubbock, TX	W 59–20	34,002	
October 29	Wichita State	Skelly Stadium; Tulsa, OK	W 30–19	23,947	
November 5	at Drake	Drake Stadium; Des Moines, IA	W 22–13	4,900	
November 12	West Texas State	Skelly Stadium; Tulsa, OK	W 31–16	22,318	
*Non-conference game; ^{†}Homecoming; Rankings from AP Poll released prior to the game

== Coaching staff ==
- John Cooper – Head Coach
- Joe Hollis – Offensive Coordinator
- Steve Logan - Quarterbacks & Receivers
- Pec Clark - Running Backs
- Kirk Doll - Offensive Line
- Bill Young - Defensive Coordinator
- Pat Henderson - Defensive Line
- Jay Cain - Cornerbacks
- Chris Thurmond - Safeties
- Jimmy Senter - Graduate Assistant
- Scott Johnson - Graduate Assistant

== After the season ==
=== 1984 NFL draft ===
The following Golden Hurricane players were selected in the 1984 NFL draft following the season.

Round	Pick	Player	Position	NFL club
4	107	Mike Gunter	Running back	Tampa Bay Buccaneers
9	234	Tom Baldwin	Nose tackle	New York Jets
