= 1983 Colorado State Rams football team =

American college football season

1983 Colorado State Rams football
- Conference: Western Athletic Conference
- Record: 5–7 (4–4 WAC)
- Head coach: Leon Fuller (2nd season)
- Offensive coordinator: Sonny Lubick (2nd season)
- Defensive coordinator: Gary Sloan (2nd season)
- Home stadium: Hughes Stadium

1983 Western Athletic Conference football standings
	Conf.					Overall
Team	W		L		T	W		L		T
No. 7 BYU $	7	–	0	–	0	11	–	1	–	0
No. 13 Air Force	5	–	2	–	0	10	–	2	–	0
Wyoming	5	–	3	–	0	7	–	5	–	0
New Mexico	4	–	3	–	0	6	–	6	–	0
Hawaii	3	–	3	–	1	5	–	5	–	1
Utah	4	–	4	–	0	5	–	6	–	0
Colorado State	4	–	4	–	0	5	–	7	–	0
San Diego State	1	–	6	–	1	2	–	9	–	1
UTEP	0	–	8	–	0	2	–	10	–	0
$ – Conference champion; Rankings from AP Poll

The 1983 Colorado State Rams football team represented Colorado State University in the Western Athletic Conference during the 1983 NCAA Division I-A football season. In their second season under head coach Leon Fuller, the Rams compiled a 5–7 record.

== Schedule ==
Date	Opponent	Site	TV	Result	Attendance	Source
September 3	Air Force	Hughes Stadium; Fort Collins, CO (rivalry)		L 13–34	28,652	
September 10	at Hawaii	Aloha Stadium; Halawa, HI		L 0–34	43,266	
September 17	at Colorado*	Folsom Field; Boulder, CO (rivalry)	KWGN	L 3–31	49,783	
September 24	at Iowa State*	Cyclone Stadium; Ames, IA		L 17–21	49,817	
October 1	Utah	Hughes Stadium; Fort Collins, CO		W 31–28	18,312	
October 8	at No. 10 Arizona*	Arizona Stadium; Tucson, AZ		L 21–52	40,309	
October 15	San Diego State	Hughes Stadium; Fort Collins, CO		W 17–15	22,979	
October 22	at UTEP	Sun Bowl; El Paso, TX		W 31–15	15,401	
October 29	New Mexico	Hughes Stadium; Fort Collins, CO		W 25–24	18,787	
November 5	Northern Colorado*	Hughes Stadium; Fort Collins, CO		W 41–20	23,877	
November 12	at No. 8 BYU	Cougar Stadium; Provo, UT		L 6–24	64,651	
November 19	at Wyoming	War Memorial Stadium; Laramie, WY (rivalry)		L 17–42	15,551	
*Non-conference game; Rankings from Coaches' Poll released prior to the game
