= 1983 Murray State Racers football team =

American college football season

1983 Murray State Racers football
- Conference: Ohio Valley Conference
- Record: 7–4 (4–3 OVC)
- Head coach: Frank Beamer (3rd season)
- Defensive coordinator: Mike Mahoney (3rd season)
- Home stadium: Roy Stewart Stadium

1983 Ohio Valley Conference football standings
	Conf.					Overall
Team	W		L		T	W		L		T
No. 8 Eastern Kentucky $^	6	–	1	–	0	7	–	2	–	1
No. 16 Middle Tennessee	5	–	2	–	0	8	–	2	–	0
Akron	5	–	2	–	0	8	–	3	–	0
Murray State	4	–	3	–	0	7	–	4	–	0
Austin Peay	3	–	4	–	0	6	–	5	–	0
Youngstown State	2	–	5	–	0	4	–	7	–	0
Tennessee Tech	2	–	5	–	0	2	–	8	–	0
Morehead State	1	–	6	–	0	2	–	9	–	0
$ – Conference champion; ^ – NCAA Division I-AA playoff participant; Rankings from NCAA Division I-AA Football Committee poll

The 1983 Murray State Racers football team represented Murray State University during the 1983 NCAA Division I-AA football season. Led by third-year head coach Frank Beamer, the Racers compiled an overall record of 7–4 with a mark of 4–3 in conference play, and finished fourth in the OVC.

== Schedule ==
Date	Opponent	Site	Result	Attendance	Source
September 3	at Southeast Missouri State*	Houck Stadium; Cape Girardeau, MO	W 25–11		
September 17	at East Carolina*	Ficklen Memorial Stadium; Greenville, NC	L 25–50	28,123	
September 24	Tennessee Tech	Roy Stewart Stadium; Murray, KY	W 20–6	8,556	
October 1	Morehead State	Roy Stewart Stadium; Murray, KY	W 38–0		
October 8	Southwest Missouri State*	Roy Stewart Stadium; Murray, KY	W 19–7	12,863	
October 15	at No. 15 Middle Tennessee	Johnny "Red" Floyd Stadium; Murfreesboro, TN	L 14–17	11,000	
October 22	at Akron	Rubber Bowl; Akron, OH	L 3–6	2,016	
October 29	No. 3 Eastern Kentucky	Roy Stewart Stadium; Murray, KY	W 23–10		
November 5	at Austin Peay	Municipal Stadium; Clarksville, TN	L 16–17	4,000	
November 12	at Youngstown State	Stambaugh Stadium; Youngstown, OH	W 19–7	2,400	
November 19	at Western Kentucky*	L. T. Smith Stadium; Bowling Green, KY (rivalry)	W 7–3	6,900	
*Non-conference game; Rankings from NCAA Division I-AA Football Committee Poll released prior to the game
