= Andy Parker (American football) =

American football player (born 1961)

No. 81, 85, 89
- Position: Tight end

Personal information
- Born: September 8, 1961 (age 65); Redlands, California, U.S.
- Listed height: 6 ft 5 in (1.96 m)
- Listed weight: 244 lb (111 kg)

Career information
- High school: Dana Hills (Dana Point, California)
- College: Utah
- NFL draft: 1984: 5th round, 127th overall pick

Career history
- Los Angeles Raiders (1984–1988); San Diego Chargers (1989); Los Angeles Raiders (1990)

Career NFL statistics
- Receptions: 8
- Receiving yards: 46
- Touchdowns: 2
- Stats at Pro Football Reference

Andrew James Parker (born September 8, 1961) is an American former professional football player who was a tight end for seven seasons in the National Football League (NFL). He played college football for the Utah Utes before playing in the NFL for the Los Angeles Raiders (1984–1988, 1990) and the San Diego Chargers (1989). An effective short yardage and goal line blocking specialist. Voted by his peers as special teams captain in 1987 and 1988.
