= Othello High School =

Coordinates: 46°49′25.36″N 119°10′2.08″W

Location
- 340 S 7th Ave; Othello, Washington 99344; United States

Information
- Type: High School
- School district: Othello School District
- Principal: Kat Acheson
- Teaching staff: 64.13 (FTE)
- Grades: 9–12
- Enrollment: 1,338 (2024-2025)
- Student to teacher ratio: 20.86
- Colors: Red, white, and black
- Mascot: Husky
- Team name: Huskies
- Website: School webpage

Othello High School is a public high school in Othello, Washington, United States, and is part of the Othello School District. Its athletics name is the Huskies. The current principal is Kat Acheson.
