= Matt Long (American football) =

American football player (born 1961)

No. 61
- Position: Center

Personal information
- Born: March 16, 1961 (age 65); Glendale, California, U.S.
- Listed height: 6 ft 3 in (1.91 m)
- Listed weight: 270 lb (122 kg)

Career information
- High school: Buena
- College: San Diego State
- NFL draft: 1984: undrafted

Career history
- Chicago Bears (1985)*; Philadelphia Eagles (1987)
- * Offseason or practice squad member only

Awards and highlights
- First-team All-WAC (1983)
- Stats at Pro Football Reference

Matthew Scott Long (born March 16, 1961) is an American former professional football player who was a center for the Philadelphia Eagles of the National Football League (NFL). He played college football for the San Diego State Aztecs.
