= McAndrew Stadium =

Demolished stadium in Illinois, USA

Coordinates: 37°42′46″N 89°13′0″W

- "The Mac"
- Interactive map of McAndrew Stadium
- Location: Travel Service Dr Carbondale, Illinois
- Owner: Southern Illinois University
- Operator: Southern Illinois University
- Capacity: 17,000
- Surface: AstroPlay turf

Construction
- Opened: October 1, 1938
- Renovated: 1973
- Expanded: 1973
- Closed: 2009
- Demolished: 2011 (stadium); 2012 (track)
- Cost: $150,000
- Main contractor: Works Progress Administration

Tenant
- SIU Salukis (NCAA)

McAndrew Stadium was a multi-purpose stadium in Carbondale, Illinois, United States. It opened in 1938 and was home to the Southern Illinois University Salukis football team, as well as the track team. It was replaced by Saluki Stadium in 2010.

Originally built by the Works Progress Administration during the Great Depression of the mid-1930s, it had a construction cost of $150,000, only seated 5,000 and was hailed as one of the most attractive stadiums in the Midwest.

The first game at the stadium took place on October 1, 1938, a 27–0 loss to Southeast Missouri State. Two weeks later, Southern Illinois University defeated Arkansas State, 6–0, for its first home win in its new stadium.

When William McAndrew, the school's first head coach, died in 1943, the university named the stadium McAndrew Stadium in his honor.

The most comprehensive renovation to the stadium took place after the 1973 season, when additional seating was erected on both sides.

Southern Illinois has played 328 games at the stadium since it first opened and has a record of 168–154–6.

Among the more memorable games include a 16–13 win over nationally ranked Tulsa on Oct. 28, 1967. In 1983, SIU beat Nevada, 23–7, to advance to the Division I-AA National Championship game.

After the 1996 Atlanta Olympics SIU competed to have the track surface and won, which meant that the Olympic track was dismantled and brought from Atlanta to McAndrew Stadium.

After a 29-year absence, night football returned to McAndrew Stadium in 2002. The Salukis opened the season with a 78–0 win over Kentucky Wesleyan on August 29, followed by a fireworks show.

Prior to 2002, the last night game at McAndrew was Oct. 20, 1973, when the Salukis hosted Tampa. The lighting system became inoperable the following year.

In 2001, a new AstroPlay turf was installed at a cost of $550,000. With its taller surface, the turf resembles natural grass. It also has a soft rubber base to provide added cushioning.

In 2003, the university's board of trustees approved a land use plan that will create a new "gateway" to SIU that includes a new football stadium.

The stadium closed at the end of the 2009 football season, and on December 15, 2010, McAndrew began demolition and was completed in February 2011. The track, however, remained until a new one was constructed by Abe Martin Field. Demolition and removal of the remaining stadium structures began in the spring of 2012. It is now home to a parking lot.
