= 1983 Northwestern State Demons football team =

American college football season

1983 Northwestern State Demons football
- Conference: Independent
- Record: 4–7
- Head coach: Sam Goodwin (1st season)
- Defensive coordinator: John Thompson (1st season)
- Home stadium: Harry Turpin Stadium

1983 NCAA Division I-AA independents football standings
	Conf.			Overall
Team	W	L	T	W		L		T
No. 3 Holy Cross ^		–		9	–	1	–	1
No. 17 Tennessee State		–		8	–	2	–	1
No. 7 Colgate ^		–		8	–	3	–	0
Lehigh		–		8	–	3	–	0
Lafayette		–		6	–	4	–	0
Northeastern		–		6	–	4	–	1
Southeastern Louisiana		–		6	–	5	–	0
William & Mary		–		6	–	5	–	0
Nicholls State		–		5	–	6	–	0
Bucknell		–		4	–	5	–	1
Delaware		–		4	–	7	–	0
Northwestern State		–		4	–	7	–	0
James Madison		–		3	–	8	–	0
Richmond		–		3	–	8	–	0
Western Kentucky		–		2	–	8	–	1
^ – NCAA Division I-AA playoff participant; Rankings from NCAA Division I-AA Football Committee poll

The 1983 Northwestern State Demons football team was an American football team that represented Northwestern State University as an independent during the 1983 NCAA Division I-AA football season. Led by first-year head coach Sam Goodwin, the Demons compiled an 4–7 record.

== Schedule ==
Date	Opponent	Site	Result	Attendance	Source
September 3	McNeese State	Harry Turpin Stadium; Natchitoches, LA (rivalry)	L 13–18		
September 10	Angelo State	Harry Turpin Stadium; Natchitoches, LA	W 30–22		
September 17	at Tulsa	Skelly Stadium; Tulsa, OK	L 19–26	20,193	
September 24	at Abilene Christian	Shotwell Stadium; Abilene, TX	L 17–20		
October 1	at Stephen F. Austin	Lumberjack Stadium; Nacogdoches, TX (rivalry)	L 25–27		
October 8	at No. 1 (D-II) Southwest Texas State	Bobcat Stadium; San Marcos, TX	L 14–16	12,881	
October 15	at Alcorn State	Mississippi Veterans Memorial Stadium; Jackson, MS	L 20–24		
October 22	vs. Louisiana Tech	Independence Stadium; Shreveport, LA (rivalry)	L 10–21	13,996	
November 5	at Nicholls State	John L. Guidry Stadium; Thibodaux, LA (rivalry)	W 24–21		
November 12	Southeastern Louisiana	Harry Turpin Stadium; Natchitoches, LA (rivalry)	W 23–7	4,150	
November 19	No. T–7 Northeast Louisiana	Harry Turpin Stadium; Natchitoches, LA (rivalry)	W 13–9		
Rankings from NCAA Division I-AA Football Committee Poll released prior to the game
