= 1983 Western Kentucky Hilltoppers football team =

American college football season

1983 Western Kentucky Hilltoppers football
- Conference: Independent
- Record: 2–8–1
- Head coach: Jimmy Feix (16th season)
- Captains: Paul Gray; Walter York
- Home stadium: L. T. Smith Stadium

1983 NCAA Division I-AA independents football standings
	Conf.			Overall
Team	W	L	T	W		L		T
No. 3 Holy Cross ^		–		9	–	1	–	1
No. 17 Tennessee State		–		8	–	2	–	1
No. 7 Colgate ^		–		8	–	3	–	0
Lehigh		–		8	–	3	–	0
Lafayette		–		6	–	4	–	0
Northeastern		–		6	–	4	–	1
Southeastern Louisiana		–		6	–	5	–	0
William & Mary		–		6	–	5	–	0
Nicholls State		–		5	–	6	–	0
Bucknell		–		4	–	5	–	1
Delaware		–		4	–	7	–	0
Northwestern State		–		4	–	7	–	0
James Madison		–		3	–	8	–	0
Richmond		–		3	–	8	–	0
Western Kentucky		–		2	–	8	–	1
^ – NCAA Division I-AA playoff participant; Rankings from NCAA Division I-AA Football Committee poll

The 1983 Western Kentucky Hilltoppers football team represented Western Kentucky University as an independent during the 1983 NCAA Division I-AA football season. Led by 16th-year head coach Jimmy Feix, the Hilltoppers compiled a record of 2–8–1. The team's captains were Paul Gray and Walter York.

== Schedule ==
Date	Opponent	Site	Result	Attendance	Source
September 10	at Louisville	Cardinal Stadium; Louisville, KY	L 22–41	31,279	
September 17	at Akron	Rubber Bowl; Akron, OH	L 13–14	8,845	
September 24	at Austin Peay	Municipal Stadium; Clarksville, TN	L 3–13	7,500	
October 1	Southeastern Louisiana	L. T. Smith Stadium; Bowling Green, KY	L 7–27	10,500	
October 8	at Youngstown State	Stambaugh Stadium; Youngstown, OH	L 13–24	6,134	
October 15	Tennessee Tech	L. T. Smith Stadium; Bowling Green, KY	W 17–0	9,000	
October 22	at No. 1 Eastern Kentucky	Hanger Field; Richmond, KY (Battle of the Bluegrass)	T 10–10	8,700	
October 29	Morehead State^{†}	L. T. Smith Stadium; Bowling Green, KY	W 38–7	14,500	
November 5	at No. T–5 Middle Tennessee	Johnny "Red" Floyd Stadium; Murfreesboro, TN (rivalry)	L 7–26	5,500	
November 12	No. 11 Eastern Illinois	L. T. Smith Stadium; Bowling Green, KY	L 14–34	5,000	
November 19	Murray State	L. T. Smith Stadium; Bowling Green, KY (rivalry)	L 3–7	6,900	
^{†}Homecoming; Rankings from NCAA Division I-AA Football Committee Poll released prior to the game
