= 1983 William & Mary Tribe football team =

American college football season

1983 William & Mary Tribe football
- Conference: Independent
- Record: 6–5
- Head coach: Jimmye Laycock (4th season)
- Captains: Steve Zeuli; Bernie Marrazzo
- Home stadium: Cary Field

1983 NCAA Division I-AA independents football standings
	Conf.			Overall
Team	W	L	T	W		L		T
No. 3 Holy Cross ^		–		9	–	1	–	1
No. 17 Tennessee State		–		8	–	2	–	1
No. 7 Colgate ^		–		8	–	3	–	0
Lehigh		–		8	–	3	–	0
Lafayette		–		6	–	4	–	0
Northeastern		–		6	–	4	–	1
Southeastern Louisiana		–		6	–	5	–	0
William & Mary		–		6	–	5	–	0
Nicholls State		–		5	–	6	–	0
Bucknell		–		4	–	5	–	1
Delaware		–		4	–	7	–	0
Northwestern State		–		4	–	7	–	0
James Madison		–		3	–	8	–	0
Richmond		–		3	–	8	–	0
Western Kentucky		–		2	–	8	–	1
^ – NCAA Division I-AA playoff participant; Rankings from NCAA Division I-AA Football Committee poll

The 1983 William & Mary Tribe football team represented the College of William & Mary as an independent during the 1983 NCAA Division I-AA football season. Led by Jimmye Laycock in his fourth year as head coach, William & Mary finished the season with a record of 6–5.

== Schedule ==
Date	Opponent	Site	Result	Attendance	Source
September 10	at VMI	Alumni Memorial Field; Lexington, VA (rivalry)	W 28–14		
September 17	Delaware	Cary Field; Williamsburg, VA (rivalry)	L 13–30	13,440	
September 24	at No. 5 North Carolina	Kenan Memorial Stadium; Chapel Hill, NC	L 20–51	49,400	
October 1	vs. Yale	Foreman Field; Norfolk, VA (Oyster Bowl)	W 26–14	20,000	
October 8	at Dartmouth	Memorial Field; Hanover, NH	W 21–17	8,500	
October 15	James Madison	Cary Field; Williamsburg, VA (rivalry)	W 24–21	12,100	
October 22	Rutgers	Cary Field; Williamsburg, VA	L 28–35		
October 29	at Virginia Tech	Lane Stadium; Blacksburg, VA	L 21–59	28,300	
November 5	at Marshall	Fairfield Stadium; Huntington, WV	W 48–24	8,808	
November 12	at East Carolina	Ficklen Stadium; Greenville, NC	L 6–40	24,731	
November 19	Richmond	Cary Field; Williamsburg, VA (I-64 Bowl)	W 24–15	10,000	
Rankings from AP Poll released prior to the game
