= 1983 Dartmouth Big Green football team =

American college football season

1983 Dartmouth Big Green football
- Conference: Ivy League
- Record: 4–5–1 (4–2–1 Ivy)
- Head coach: Joe Yukica (6th season)
- Captains: David Fuhrman; Francis Polsinello
- Home stadium: Memorial Field

1983 Ivy League football standings
	Conf.					Overall
Team	W		L		T	W		L		T
Harvard +	5	–	1	–	1	6	–	2	–	2
Penn +	5	–	1	–	1	6	–	3	–	1
Brown	4	–	2	–	1	4	–	5	–	1
Dartmouth	4	–	2	–	1	4	–	5	–	1
Cornell	3	–	3	–	1	3	–	6	–	1
Princeton	2	–	5	–	0	4	–	6	–	0
Columbia	1	–	5	–	1	1	–	7	–	2
Yale	1	–	6	–	0	1	–	9	–	0
+ – Conference co-champions

The 1983 Dartmouth Big Green football team was an American football team that represented Dartmouth College during the 1983 NCAA Division I-AA football season. Dartmouth tied for third place in the Ivy League.

In their sixth season under head coach Joe Yukica, the Big Green compiled a 4–5–1 record and were outscored 208 to 185. Francis Polsinello and David Fuhrman were the team captains.

The Big Green's 4–2–1 conference record tied for third-best in the Ivy League standings. Dartmouth outscored Ivy opponents 142 to 133. Dartmouth's sole league loss was to its co-champion, Yale.

Dartmouth played its home games at Memorial Field on the college campus in Hanover, New Hampshire.

== Schedule ==
Date	Opponent	Site	Result	Attendance	Source
September 17	Princeton	Memorial Field; Hanover, NH	W 21–3	10,022	
September 24	at Army*	Michie Stadium; West Point, NY	L 12–13	36,637	
October 1	No. 9 Holy Cross*	Memorial Field; Hanover, NH	L 14–41	10,753	
October 8	William & Mary*	Memorial Field; Hanover, NH	L 17–21	8,500	
October 15	at Harvard	Harvard Stadium; Boston, MA (rivalry)	W 28–12	22,724	
October 22	Cornell	Memorial Field; Hanover, NH (rivalry)	W 31–17	13,547	
October 29	at Yale	Yale Bowl; New Haven, CT	W 24–21	22,007	
November 5	at Columbia	Giants Stadium; East Rutherford, NJ	T 17–17	6,064	
November 12	Brown	Memorial Field; Hanover, NH	L 7–25	8,483	
November 19	at Penn	Franklin Field; Philadelphia, PA	L 14–38	28,416	
*Non-conference game; Rankings from the latest NCAA Division I-AA poll released prior to the game
