= 1983 North Carolina A&T Aggies football team =

American college football season

1983 North Carolina A&T Aggies football
- Conference: Mid-Eastern Athletic Conference
- Record: 3–7–1 (1–3 MEAC)
- Head coach: Mo Forte (2nd season)
- Home stadium: Aggie Stadium

1983 Mid-Eastern Athletic Conference football standings
	Conf.					Overall
Team	W		L		T	W		L		T
No. 18 South Carolina State $	4	–	0	–	0	7	–	3	–	0
Delaware State	3	–	1	–	0	7	–	3	–	1
Bethune–Cookman	1	–	3	–	0	4	–	4	–	1
North Carolina A&T	1	–	3	–	0	3	–	7	–	1
Howard	1	–	3	–	0	1	–	9	–	0
Florida A&M	0	–	0	–	0	7	–	4	–	0
$ – Conference champion; ^ – NCAA Division I-AA playoff participant; Florida A&M games did not count as conference games; Rankings from NCAA Division I-AA Football Committee poll

The 1983 North Carolina A&T Aggies football team represented North Carolina A&T State University as member of the Mid-Eastern Athletic Conference (MEAC) during the 1983 NCAA Division I-AA football season. Led by second-year head coach Mo Forte, the Aggies compiled an overall record of 3–7–1, with a mark of 1–3 in conference play, and finished tied for third in the MEAC.

== Schedule ==
Date	Opponent	Site	Result	Attendance	Source
September 10	Winston-Salem State*	Aggie Stadium; Greensboro, NC (rivalry)	L 24–37		
September 17	at South Carolina State	State College Stadium; Orangeburg, SC (rivalry)	L 7–45	10,195	
September 24	at Morgan State*	Hughes Stadium; Baltimore, MD	L 12–24		
October 1	Johnson C. Smith*	Aggie Stadium; Greensboro, NC	W 42–35	17,500	
October 8	at Hampton*	Armstrong Stadium; Hampton, VA	W 13–10	5,681	
October 15	at Delaware State	Alumni Stadium; Dover, DE	L 7–26	7,000	
October 22	Howard	Aggie Stadium; Greensboro, NC	W 22–0		
October 29	at Bethune–Cookman	Memorial Stadium; Daytona Beach, FL	L 3–38	9,500	
November 5	Florida A&M	Aggie Stadium; Greensboro, NC	L 14–35		
November 12	North Carolina Central*	Aggie Stadium; Greensboro, NC (rivalry)	T 13–13		
November 19	No. 18 Tennessee State*	Aggie Stadium; Greensboro, NC	L 0–57	7,625	
*Non-conference game; Rankings from NCAA Division I-AA Football Committee Poll released prior to the game
