= 1983 Bethune–Cookman Wildcats football team =

American college football season

1983 Bethune–Cookman Wildcats football
- Conference: Mid-Eastern Athletic Conference
- Record: 4–4–1 (1–3 MEAC)
- Head coach: Larry Little (1st season)
- Offensive coordinator: Rick Stockstill (1st season)
- Home stadium: Memorial Stadium

1983 Mid-Eastern Athletic Conference football standings
| | Conf. | | | | | Overall |
| Team | W | | L | | T | W | | L | | T |
|---|---|---|---|---|---|---|---|---|---|---|
| No. 18 South Carolina State $ | 4 | – | 0 | – | 0 | 7 | – | 3 | – | 0 |
| Delaware State | 3 | – | 1 | – | 0 | 7 | – | 3 | – | 1 |
| Bethune–Cookman | 1 | – | 3 | – | 0 | 4 | – | 4 | – | 1 |
| North Carolina A&T | 1 | – | 3 | – | 0 | 3 | – | 7 | – | 1 |
| Howard | 1 | – | 3 | – | 0 | 1 | – | 9 | – | 0 |
| Florida A&M | 0 | – | 0 | – | 0 | 7 | – | 4 | – | 0 |
$ – Conference champion; ^ – NCAA Division I-AA playoff participant; Florida A&M games did not count as conference games; Rankings from NCAA Division I-AA Football Committee poll

The 1983 Bethune–Cookman Wildcats football team represented Bethune–Cookman College (now known as Bethune–Cookman University) as a member of the Mid-Eastern Athletic Conference (MEAC) during the 1983 NCAA Division I-AA football season. Led by first-year head coach Larry Little, the Wildcats compiled an overall record of 4–4–1, with a mark of 1–3 in conference play, and finished tied for third in the MEAC.

== Schedule ==
| Date | Opponent | Site | Result | Attendance | Source |
|---|---|---|---|---|---|
| September 10 | District of Columbia* | Memorial Stadium; Daytona Beach, FL | W 51–0 | 5,700 | |
| September 17 | vs. Howard | Gator Bowl Stadium; Jacksonville, FL (Gateway Classic) | L 17–20 | | |
| October 1 | at Delaware State | Alumni Stadium; Dover, DE | L 16–23 | | |
| October 15 | Alabama State* | Memorial Stadium; Daytona Beach, FL | W 24–6 | 3,000 | |
| October 22 | vs. No. 12 Tennessee State* | Florida Citrus Bowl; Orlando, FL | L 19–21 | 6,500 | |
| October 29 | North Carolina A&T^{†} | Memorial Stadium; Daytona Beach, FL | W 38–3 | 9,500 | |
| November 5 | at No. T–7 South Carolina State | State College Stadium; Orangeburg, SC | L 7–28 | | |
| November 12 | at Morris Brown* | Herndon Stadium; Atlanta, GA | T 21–21 | 13,000 | |
| November 26 | at UCF* | Florida Citrus Bowl; Orlando, FL | W 31–22 | 13,294 | |
*Non-conference game; ^{†}Homecoming; Rankings from NCAA Division I-AA Football Committee Poll released prior to the game
