= 1983 Howard Bison football team =

American college football season

1983 Howard Bison football
- Conference: Mid-Eastern Athletic Conference
- Record: 1–9 (1–3 MEAC)
- Head coach: Joe Taylor (1st season)
- Home stadium: Howard Stadium

1983 Mid-Eastern Athletic Conference football standings
	Conf.					Overall
Team	W		L		T	W		L		T
No. 18 South Carolina State $	4	–	0	–	0	7	–	3	–	0
Delaware State	3	–	1	–	0	7	–	3	–	1
Bethune–Cookman	1	–	3	–	0	4	–	4	–	1
North Carolina A&T	1	–	3	–	0	3	–	7	–	1
Howard	1	–	3	–	0	1	–	9	–	0
Florida A&M	0	–	0	–	0	7	–	4	–	0
$ – Conference champion; ^ – NCAA Division I-AA playoff participant; Florida A&M games did not count as conference games; Rankings from NCAA Division I-AA Football Committee poll

The 1983 Howard Bison football team represented Howard University as a member of the Mid-Eastern Athletic Conference (MEAC) during the 1983 NCAA Division I-AA football season. Led by first-year head coach Joe Taylor, the Bison compiled an overall record of 1–9, with a mark of 1–3 in conference play, and finished tied for third in the MEAC.

== Schedule ==
Date	Opponent	Site	Result	Attendance	Source
September 3	at Liberty Baptist*	City Stadium; Lynchburg, VA	L 10–15	5,321	
September 10	at Bucknell*	Memorial Stadium; Lewisburg, PA	L 0–12	3,000	
September 17	vs. Bethune–Cookman	Gator Bowl Stadium; Jacksonville, FL (Gateway Classic)	W 20–17		
September 24	No. 1 South Carolina State	Howard Stadium; Washington, D.C.	L 7–28	10,000	
October 1	Florida A&M	Howard Stadium; Washington, DC	L 17–21		
October 15	Virginia State*	Howard Stadium; Washington, DC	L 14–30		
October 22	at North Carolina A&T	Aggie Stadium; Greensboro, NC	L 0–22		
October 29	Norfolk State*	Howard Stadium; Washington, DC	L 12–19		
November 12	at Morgan State	Hughes Stadium; Baltimore, MD (rivalry)	L 14–15		
November 19	at Delaware State	Alumni Stadium; Dover, DE	L 20–62	6,001	
*Non-conference game; Rankings from NCAA Division I-AA Football Committee Poll released prior to the game
