= 1983 Lehigh Engineers football team =

American college football season

1983 Lehigh Engineers football
- Conference: Independent
- Record: 8–3
- Head coach: John Whitehead (8th season)
- Captains: John Shigo; Lance Williams
- Home stadium: Taylor Stadium

1983 NCAA Division I-AA independents football standings
	Conf.			Overall
Team	W	L	T	W		L		T
No. 3 Holy Cross ^		–		9	–	1	–	1
No. 17 Tennessee State		–		8	–	2	–	1
No. 7 Colgate ^		–		8	–	3	–	0
Lehigh		–		8	–	3	–	0
Lafayette		–		6	–	4	–	0
Northeastern		–		6	–	4	–	1
Southeastern Louisiana		–		6	–	5	–	0
William & Mary		–		6	–	5	–	0
Nicholls State		–		5	–	6	–	0
Bucknell		–		4	–	5	–	1
Delaware		–		4	–	7	–	0
Northwestern State		–		4	–	7	–	0
James Madison		–		3	–	8	–	0
Richmond		–		3	–	8	–	0
Western Kentucky		–		2	–	8	–	1
^ – NCAA Division I-AA playoff participant; Rankings from NCAA Division I-AA Football Committee poll

The 1983 Lehigh Engineers football team was an American football team that represented Lehigh University as an independent during the 1983 NCAA Division I-AA football season.

In their eighth year under head coach John Whitehead, the Engineers compiled an 8–3 record. John Shigo and Lance Williams were the team captains.

Lehigh played its home games at Taylor Stadium on the university's main campus in Bethlehem, Pennsylvania.

== Schedule ==
Date	Opponent	Site	Result	Attendance	Source
September 10	Northeastern	Taylor Stadium; Bethlehem, PA	W 38–10	9,000	
September 17	at Colgate	Andy Kerr Stadium; Hamilton, NY	L 23–47	6,000	
September 24	at Navy	Navy–Marine Corps Memorial Stadium; Annapolis, MD	L 0–30	23,000	
October 1	at Delaware	Delaware Stadium; Newark, DE (rivalry)	W 24–19	18,099	
October 8	Connecticut	Taylor Stadium; Bethlehem, PA	W 13–7	12,000	
October 15	at New Hampshire	Cowell Stadium; Durham, NH	L 28–52	8,550	
October 22	at Army	Michie Stadium; West Point, NY	W 13–12	41,000	
October 29	at Bucknell	Memorial Stadium; Lewisburg, PA	W 40–15		
November 5	UMass	Taylor Stadium; Bethlehem, PA	W 21–20	14,000	
November 12	East Stroudsburg	Taylor Stadium; Bethlehem, PA	W 17–3	9,500	
November 19	at Lafayette	Taylor Stadium; Bethlehem, PA (The Rivalry)	W 22–14	19,000	
