= 1983 Florida A&M Rattlers football team =

American college football season

1983 Florida A&M Rattlers football
- Conference: Mid-Eastern Athletic Conference
- Record: 7–4 (0–0 MEAC)
- Head coach: Rudy Hubbard (10th season)
- Home stadium: Bragg Memorial Stadium

1983 Mid-Eastern Athletic Conference football standings
| | Conf. | | | | | Overall |
| Team | W | | L | | T | W | | L | | T |
|---|---|---|---|---|---|---|---|---|---|---|
| No. 18 South Carolina State $ | 4 | – | 0 | – | 0 | 7 | – | 3 | – | 0 |
| Delaware State | 3 | – | 1 | – | 0 | 7 | – | 3 | – | 1 |
| Bethune–Cookman | 1 | – | 3 | – | 0 | 4 | – | 4 | – | 1 |
| North Carolina A&T | 1 | – | 3 | – | 0 | 3 | – | 7 | – | 1 |
| Howard | 1 | – | 3 | – | 0 | 1 | – | 9 | – | 0 |
| Florida A&M | 0 | – | 0 | – | 0 | 7 | – | 4 | – | 0 |
$ – Conference champion; ^ – NCAA Division I-AA playoff participant; Florida A&M games did not count as conference games; Rankings from NCAA Division I-AA Football Committee poll

The 1983 Florida A&M Rattlers football team represented Florida A&M University as a member of the Mid-Eastern Athletic Conference (MEAC) during the 1983 NCAA Division I-AA football season. Led by tenth-year head coach Rudy Hubbard, the Rattlers compiled an overall record of 7–4, with a mark of 0–0 in conference play, and finished last in the MEAC.

== Schedule ==
| Date | Opponent | Site | Result | Attendance | Source |
|---|---|---|---|---|---|
| September 10 | Fort Valley State* | Bragg Memorial Stadium; Tallahassee, FL | W 35–10 | | |
| September 17 | Delaware State | Bragg Memorial Stadium; Tallahassee, FL | L 34–36 | 6,703 | |
| September 24 | No. 16 Tennessee State* | Bragg Memorial Stadium; Tallahassee, FL | L 13–23 | | |
| October 1 | at Howard | Howard Stadium; Washington, D.C. | W 21–17 | | |
| October 8 | vs. No. 4 Jackson State* | Gator Bowl Stadium; Jacksonville, FL (Bold City Classic) | L 22–28 | 20,331 | |
| October 15 | Albany State* | Bragg Memorial Stadium; Tallahassee, FL | W 42–0 | 22,788 | |
| October 22 | No. 5 South Carolina State | Bragg Memorial Stadium; Tallahassee, FL | W 17–14 | | |
| October 29 | at Alcorn State* | Henderson Stadium; Lorman, MS | L 30–43 | | |
| November 5 | at North Carolina A&T | Aggie Stadium; Greensboro, NC | W 35–14 | | |
| November 12 | vs. Southern* | Tampa Stadium; Tampa, FL (Orange Blossom Classic) | W 31–14 | 21,624 | |
| November 19 | No. 4 Eastern Kentucky* | Bragg Memorial Stadium; Tallahassee, FL | W 35–10 | 6,427 | |
*Non-conference game; Rankings from NCAA Division I-AA Football Committee Poll released prior to the game
