= 1983 Delaware Fightin' Blue Hens football team =

American college football season

1983 Delaware Fightin' Blue Hens football
- Conference: Independent
- Record: 4–7
- Head coach: Tubby Raymond (18th season)
- Offensive coordinator: Ted Kempski (16th season)
- Offensive scheme: Delaware Wing-T
- Base defense: 5–2
- Home stadium: Delaware Stadium

1983 NCAA Division I-AA independents football standings
	Conf.			Overall
Team	W	L	T	W		L		T
No. 3 Holy Cross ^		–		9	–	1	–	1
No. 17 Tennessee State		–		8	–	2	–	1
No. 7 Colgate ^		–		8	–	3	–	0
Lehigh		–		8	–	3	–	0
Lafayette		–		6	–	4	–	0
Northeastern		–		6	–	4	–	1
Southeastern Louisiana		–		6	–	5	–	0
William & Mary		–		6	–	5	–	0
Nicholls State		–		5	–	6	–	0
Bucknell		–		4	–	5	–	1
Delaware		–		4	–	7	–	0
Northwestern State		–		4	–	7	–	0
James Madison		–		3	–	8	–	0
Richmond		–		3	–	8	–	0
Western Kentucky		–		2	–	8	–	1
^ – NCAA Division I-AA playoff participant; Rankings from NCAA Division I-AA Football Committee poll

The 1983 Delaware Fightin' Blue Hens football team represented the University of Delaware as an independent during the 1983 NCAA Division I-AA football season. Led by 18th-year head coach Tubby Raymond, the Fightin' Blue Hens compiled a record of 4–7. The team played home games at Delaware Stadium in Newark, Delaware.

== Schedule ==
Date	Opponent	Site	Result	Attendance	Source
September 10	West Chester	Delaware Stadium; Newark,DE (rivalry)	L 27–35	15,818	
September 17	at William & Mary	Cary Field; Williamsburg, VA (rivalry)	W 30–13	13,440	
September 24	Penn	Delaware Stadium; Newark, DE	W 40–7	17,568	
October 1	Lehigh	Delaware Stadium; Newark, DE (rivalry)	L 19–24	18,099	
October 8	UMass	Delaware Stadium; Newark, DE	W 16–13	19,737	
October 15	Towson State	Delaware Stadium; Newark, DE	L 4–13		
October 22	Temple	Delaware Stadium; Newark, DE	L 16–23	18,096	
October 29	at James Madison	JMU Stadium; Harrisonburg, VA (rivalry)	W 26–23	9,200	
November 5	at Rhode Island	Meade Stadium; Kingston, RI	L 9–19	5,307	
November 12	No. 3 Holy Cross	Delaware Stadium; Newark, DE	L 0–24	16,432	
November 19	Bucknell	Delaware Stadium; Newark, DE	L 7–20	15,722	
Rankings from NCAA Division I-AA Football Committee Poll released prior to the game
