= 1983 Northeastern Huskies football team =

American college football season

1983 Northeastern Huskies football
- Conference: Independent
- Record: 6–4–1
- Head coach: Paul Pawlak (3rd season)
- Home stadium: Parsons Field

1983 NCAA Division I-AA independents football standings
	Conf.			Overall
Team	W	L	T	W		L		T
No. 3 Holy Cross ^		–		9	–	1	–	1
No. 17 Tennessee State		–		8	–	2	–	1
No. 7 Colgate ^		–		8	–	3	–	0
Lehigh		–		8	–	3	–	0
Lafayette		–		6	–	4	–	0
Northeastern		–		6	–	4	–	1
Southeastern Louisiana		–		6	–	5	–	0
William & Mary		–		6	–	5	–	0
Nicholls State		–		5	–	6	–	0
Bucknell		–		4	–	5	–	1
Delaware		–		4	–	7	–	0
Northwestern State		–		4	–	7	–	0
James Madison		–		3	–	8	–	0
Richmond		–		3	–	8	–	0
Western Kentucky		–		2	–	8	–	1
^ – NCAA Division I-AA playoff participant; Rankings from NCAA Division I-AA Football Committee poll

The 1983 Northeastern Huskies football team was an American football team that represented Northeastern University as an independent during the 1983 NCAA Division I-AA football season. Led by third-year head coach Paul Pawlak, the team compiled a 6–4–1 record.

== Schedule ==
Date	Opponent	Site	Result	Attendance	Source
September 10	at Lehigh	Taylor Stadium; Bethlehem, PA	L 10–38	9,000	
September 17	Connecticut	Parsons Field; Brookline, MA	W 28–7	4,100	
September 24	at C. W. Post	Hickox Field; Greenvale, NY	W 14–10	2,612	
October 1	Springfield	Parsons Field; Brookline, MA	W 22–7	4,300	
October 8	at Rhode Island	Meade Stadium; Kingston, RI	L 10–30	12,211	
October 15	at American International	Miller Field; Springfield, MA	W 20–17	4,000	
October 22	at New Hampshire	Cowell Stadium; Durham, NH	L 7–24	5,000	
October 29	Maine	Parsons Field; Brookline, MA	L 14–17	6,250	
November 5	at Central Connecticut	Arute Field; New Britain, CT	W 43–14	2,500	
November 12	Delaware State	Parsons Field; Brookline, MA	T 21–21	3,030	
November 19	UMass	Parsons Field; Brookline, MA	W 31–14	4,200	
