= 1983 Harvard Crimson football team =

American college football season

1983 Harvard Crimson football

Ivy League co-champion
- Conference: Ivy League
- Record: 6–2–2 (5–1–1 Ivy)
- Head coach: Joe Restic (13th season)
- Captain: Joseph K. Azelby
- Home stadium: Harvard Stadium

1983 Ivy League football standings
	Conf.					Overall
Team	W		L		T	W		L		T
Harvard +	5	–	1	–	1	6	–	2	–	2
Penn +	5	–	1	–	1	6	–	3	–	1
Brown	4	–	2	–	1	4	–	5	–	1
Dartmouth	4	–	2	–	1	4	–	5	–	1
Cornell	3	–	3	–	1	3	–	6	–	1
Princeton	2	–	5	–	0	4	–	6	–	0
Columbia	1	–	5	–	1	1	–	7	–	2
Yale	1	–	6	–	0	1	–	9	–	0
+ – Conference co-champions

The 1983 Harvard Crimson football team was an American football team that represented Harvard University during the 1983 NCAA Division I-AA football season. Harvard was co-champion of the Ivy League.

In their 13th year under head coach Joe Restic, the Crimson compiled a 6–2–2 record and outscored opponents 188 to 140. Joseph K. Azelby was the team captain.

Harvard's 5–1–1 conference record tied for best in the Ivy League standings. The Crimson outscored Ivy opponents 147 to 88. Harvard defeated its co-champion, Penn, in their head-to-head matchup.

Harvard played its home games at Harvard Stadium in the Allston neighborhood of Boston, Massachusetts.

== Schedule ==
Date	Opponent	Site	Result	Attendance	Source
September 17	Columbia	Harvard Stadium; Boston, MA	W 43–14	8,500	
September 24	UMass*	Harvard Stadium; Boston, MA	L 7–21	12,500	
October 1	Army*	Harvard Stadium; Boston, MA	W 24–21	15,000	
October 8	at Cornell	Schoellkopf Field; Ithaca, NY	T 3–3	11,350	
October 15	Dartmouth	Harvard Stadium; Boston, MA (rivalry)	L 12–28	22,724	
October 22	Princeton	Harvard Stadium; Boston, MA (rivalry)	W 28–26	15,500	
October 29	at Brown	Brown Stadium; Providence, RI	W 17–10	13,100	
November 5	No. 2 Holy Cross*	Harvard Stadium; Boston, MA	T 10–10	8,000	
November 12	Penn	Harvard Stadium; Boston, MA (rivalry)	W 28–0	12,000	
November 19	at Yale	Yale Bowl; New Haven, CT (The Game)	W 16–7	70,097	
*Non-conference game; Rankings from NCAA Division I-AA Football Committee Poll released prior to the game
