= 1983 Columbia Lions football team =

American college football season

1983 Columbia Lions football
- Conference: Ivy League
- Record: 1–7–2 (1–5–1 Ivy)
- Head coach: Bob Naso (4th season)
- Captain: John Witkowski
- Home stadium: Giants Stadium, Hofstra Stadium

1983 Ivy League football standings
	Conf.					Overall
Team	W		L		T	W		L		T
Harvard +	5	–	1	–	1	6	–	2	–	2
Penn +	5	–	1	–	1	6	–	3	–	1
Brown	4	–	2	–	1	4	–	5	–	1
Dartmouth	4	–	2	–	1	4	–	5	–	1
Cornell	3	–	3	–	1	3	–	6	–	1
Princeton	2	–	5	–	0	4	–	6	–	0
Columbia	1	–	5	–	1	1	–	7	–	2
Yale	1	–	6	–	0	1	–	9	–	0
+ – Conference co-champions

The 1983 Columbia Lions football team was an American football team that represented Columbia University during the 1983 NCAA Division I-AA football season. Columbia placed second-to-last in the Ivy League.

In their fourth season under head coach Bob Naso, the Lions compiled a 1–7–2 record and were outscored 363 to 218. John Witkowski was the team captain.

The Lions' 1–5–1 conference record finished seventh in the Ivy League standings. Columbia was outscored 221 to 130 by Ivy opponents.

This season marked the start of a winless streak and a losing streak that would become the worst-ever in Division I. Following their October 15 win over Yale, Columbia would go 47 games without a win. As the Bucknell and Dartmouth games in 1983 would also be the only tie games during the streak, this meant four complete seasons (1984 to 1987) of nothing but losses, with 44 losses in a row. The streak finally ended with a homecoming win October 9, 1988, against Princeton. This stretch included 33 consecutive Ivy League losses, starting with 1983's Cornell and Brown games. A decade later, Columbia's streak was surpassed by an 80-game loss streak by Prairie View A&M in 1989–1998.

Columbia scheduled most of its games on the road in 1983, as its own football stadium was being rebuilt. The Lions hosted two home games at the NFL's Giants Stadium in East Rutherford, New Jersey, and one game at Hofstra Stadium in Hempstead, New York.

== Schedule ==
Date	Opponent	Site	Result	Attendance	Source
September 17	at Harvard	Harvard Stadium; Boston, MA	L 14–43	8,500	
September 24	at No. 17 Lafayette*	Fisher Field; Easton, PA	L 29–34	10,750	
September 30	Penn	Giants Stadium; East Rutherford, NJ	L 10–35	7,221	
October 8	at Princeton	Palmer Stadium; Princeton, NJ	L 26–35	12,240	
October 15	at Yale	Yale Bowl; New Haven, CT	W 21–18	13,523	
October 22	Bucknell*	Hofstra Stadium; Hempstead, NY	T 31–31	3,750	
October 29	at No. 2 Holy Cross*	Fitton Field; Worcester, MA	L 28–77	12,861	
November 5	Dartmouth	Giants Stadium; East Rutherford, NJ	T 17–17	6,064	
November 12	at Cornell	Schoellkopf Field; Ithaca, NY (rivalry)	L 6–31	3,500	
November 19	at Brown	Brown Stadium; Providence, RI	L 36–42	7,500	
*Non-conference game; Rankings from the latest NCAA Division I-AA poll released prior to the game
