= 1983 Bucknell Bison football team =

American college football season

1983 Bucknell Bison football
- Conference: Independent
- Record: 4–5–1
- Head coach: Bob Curtis (9th season)
- Captains: Ron Clark; Brad Henneman; Shane Snyder
- Home stadium: Memorial Stadium

1983 NCAA Division I-AA independents football standings
	Conf.			Overall
Team	W	L	T	W		L		T
No. 3 Holy Cross ^		–		9	–	1	–	1
No. 17 Tennessee State		–		8	–	2	–	1
No. 7 Colgate ^		–		8	–	3	–	0
Lehigh		–		8	–	3	–	0
Lafayette		–		6	–	4	–	0
Northeastern		–		6	–	4	–	1
Southeastern Louisiana		–		6	–	5	–	0
William & Mary		–		6	–	5	–	0
Nicholls State		–		5	–	6	–	0
Bucknell		–		4	–	5	–	1
Delaware		–		4	–	7	–	0
Northwestern State		–		4	–	7	–	0
James Madison		–		3	–	8	–	0
Richmond		–		3	–	8	–	0
Western Kentucky		–		2	–	8	–	1
^ – NCAA Division I-AA playoff participant; Rankings from NCAA Division I-AA Football Committee poll

The 1983 Bucknell Bison football team was an American football team that represented Bucknell University as an independent during the 1983 NCAA Division I-AA football season.

In their ninth year under head coach Bob Curtis, the Bison compiled a 4–5–1 record. Ron Clark, Brad Henneman and Shane Snyder were the team captains.

Bucknell played its home games at Memorial Stadium on the university campus in Lewisburg, Pennsylvania.

== Schedule ==
Date	Opponent	Site	Result	Attendance	Source
September 10	Howard	Memorial Stadium; Lewisburg, PA	W 12–0	3,000	
September 17	Merchant Marine	Memorial Stadium; Lewisburg, PA	W 21–3		
September 24	at Princeton	Palmer Stadium; Princeton, NJ	L 28–46	10,170	
October 1	at No. 15 Lafayette	Fisher Field; Easton, PA	L 3–33	9,200	
October 8	New Hampshire^	Memorial Stadium; Lewisburg, PA	L 35–42		
October 22	at Columbia	Hofstra Stadium; Hempstead, NY	T 31–31	3,750	
October 29	Lehigh^{†}	Memorial Stadium; Lewisburg, PA	L 15–40		
November 5	Davidson	Memorial Stadium; Lewisburg, PA	W 50–7	1,000	
November 12	at No. 17 Boston University	Nickerson Field; Boston, MA	L 8–35	1,612	
November 19	at Delaware	Delaware Stadium; Newark, DE	W 20–7	15,722	
^{†}Homecoming; ^ Parents Weekend; Rankings from NCAA Division I-AA Football Committee Poll released prior to the game

== Roster ==
1983 Bucknell Bison football team roster
Players			Coaches
Offense: Pos. / # / Name / Class; RB / 21 / Earl Beecham / Fr	Defense: Pos. / # / Name / Class; DE / 82 / Jim Zack / Jr	Special teams: Pos. / # / Name / Class	Head coach: Bob Curtis; Coordinators/assistant coaches Legend: (C) Team captain; (S) Suspended; (I) Ineligible; Injured; Redshirt
