= 1983 Richmond Spiders football team =

American college football season

1983 Richmond Spiders football
- Conference: Independent
- Record: 3–8
- Head coach: Dal Shealy (4th season)
- Offensive coordinator: Jim Marshall (5th season)
- Home stadium: UR Stadium

1983 NCAA Division I-AA independents football standings
| | Conf. | | | Overall |
| Team | W | L | T | W | | L | | T |
|---|---|---|---|---|---|---|---|---|
| No. 3 Holy Cross ^ | | – | | 9 | – | 1 | – | 1 |
| No. 17 Tennessee State | | – | | 8 | – | 2 | – | 1 |
| No. 7 Colgate ^ | | – | | 8 | – | 3 | – | 0 |
| Lehigh | | – | | 8 | – | 3 | – | 0 |
| Lafayette | | – | | 6 | – | 4 | – | 0 |
| Northeastern | | – | | 6 | – | 4 | – | 1 |
| Southeastern Louisiana | | – | | 6 | – | 5 | – | 0 |
| William & Mary | | – | | 6 | – | 5 | – | 0 |
| Nicholls State | | – | | 5 | – | 6 | – | 0 |
| Bucknell | | – | | 4 | – | 5 | – | 1 |
| Delaware | | – | | 4 | – | 7 | – | 0 |
| Northwestern State | | – | | 4 | – | 7 | – | 0 |
| James Madison | | – | | 3 | – | 8 | – | 0 |
| Richmond | | – | | 3 | – | 8 | – | 0 |
| Western Kentucky | | – | | 2 | – | 8 | – | 1 |
^ – NCAA Division I-AA playoff participant; Rankings from NCAA Division I-AA Football Committee poll

The 1983 Richmond Spiders football team was an American football team that represented the University of Richmond as an independent during the 1983 NCAA Division I-AA football season. In their fourth season under head coach Dal Shealy, Richmond compiled a 3–8 record.

== Schedule ==
| Date | Opponent | Site | Result | Attendance | Source |
|---|---|---|---|---|---|
| September 3 | at Southern Miss | M. M. Roberts Stadium; Hattiesburg, MS | L 3–32 | 27,351 | |
| September 10 | Ohio | UR Stadium; Richmond, VA | L 10–17 | 5,500 | |
| September 17 | Toledo | UR Stadium; Richmond, VA | L 6–31 | 6,400 | |
| September 24 | Wake Forest | UR Stadium; Richmond, VA | L 6–31 | 6,923 | |
| October 8 | Boston University | UR Stadium; Richmond, VA | L 17–26 | 7,110 | |
| October 15 | UCF | UR Stadium; Richmond, VA | W 31–26 | 3,413 | |
| October 22 | at Virginia Tech | Lane Stadium; Blacksburg, VA | L 0–38 | 34,400 | |
| October 29 | at VMI | Alumni Memorial Field; Lexington, VA (rivalry) | W 35–19 | 4,600 | |
| November 5 | James Madison | UR Stadium; Richmond, VA (rivalry) | W 32–0 | | |
| November 12 | at No. 15 Colgate | Andy Kerr Stadium; Hamilton, NY | L 14–43 | 4,000 | |
| November 19 | at William & Mary | Cary Field; Williamsburg, VA (rivalry) | L 15–24 | 10,000 | |
Rankings from NCAA Division I-AA Football Committee Poll released prior to the game
