= 1983 Brown Bears football team =

American college football season

1983 Brown Bears football
- Conference: Ivy League
- Record: 4–5–1 (4–2–1 Ivy)
- Head coach: John Anderson (11th season)
- Offensive coordinator: Joe Wirth (2nd season)
- Defensive coordinator: Ray Tellier (2nd season)
- Captains: John Daniel; Joe Potter
- Home stadium: Brown Stadium

1983 Ivy League football standings
	Conf.					Overall
Team	W		L		T	W		L		T
Harvard +	5	–	1	–	1	6	–	2	–	2
Penn +	5	–	1	–	1	6	–	3	–	1
Brown	4	–	2	–	1	4	–	5	–	1
Dartmouth	4	–	2	–	1	4	–	5	–	1
Cornell	3	–	3	–	1	3	–	6	–	1
Princeton	2	–	5	–	0	4	–	6	–	0
Columbia	1	–	5	–	1	1	–	7	–	2
Yale	1	–	6	–	0	1	–	9	–	0
+ – Conference co-champions

The 1983 Brown Bears football team was an American football team that represented Brown University as member of the Ivy League during the 1983 NCAA Division I-AA football season. Brown. In their 11th and final season under head coach John Anderson, the Bears compiled an overall record of 4–5–1 record with a mark of 4–2–1 in conference play, tying for third place in the Ivy League. They were outscored 237 to 204 in all games, but outscored Ivy opponents 157 to 138. John Daniel and J. Potter were the team captains. The Bears played home games at Brown Stadium in Providence, Rhode Island.

== Schedule ==
Date	Time	Opponent	Site	Result	Attendance	Source
September 17	1:30 p.m.	at Yale	Yale Bowl; New Haven, CT	W 26–24	14,037	
September 24	1:30 p.m.	Rhode Island*	Brown Stadium; Providence, RI (rivalry)	L 16–30	13,700	
October 1	1:30 p.m.	Princeton^{†}	Brown Stadium; Providence, RI	L 16–27	10,009	
October 8	1:30 p.m.	at Penn	Franklin Field; Philadelphia, PA	T 24–24	14,576	
October 15	1:30 p.m.	Cornell	Brown Stadium; Providence, RI	W 14–3	10,750	
October 22	1:30 p.m.	at No. 4 Holy Cross*	Fitton Field; Worcester, MA	L 10–31	16,004	
October 29	1:30 p.m.	Harvard	Brown Stadium; Providence, RI	L 10–17	13,100	
November 5	1:30 p.m.	at Penn State*	Beaver Stadium; State College, PA	L 21–38	84,670	
November 12	1:30 p.m.	at Dartmouth	Memorial Field; Hanover, NH	W 25–7	8,483	
November 19	1:30 p.m.	Columbia	Brown Stadium; Providence, RI	W 42–36	7,500	
*Non-conference game; ^{†}Homecoming; Rankings from NCAA Division I-AA Football Committee Poll released prior to the game; All times are in Eastern time
