= 1983 Maine Black Bears football team =

American college football season

1983 Maine Black Bears football
- Conference: Yankee Conference
- Record: 4–6 (0–5 Yankee)
- Head coach: Ron Rogerson (3rd season)
- Offensive coordinator: Steve Tosches (1st season)
- Home stadium: Alumni Field

1983 Yankee Conference football standings
	Conf.					Overall
Team	W		L		T	W		L		T
No. T–13 Boston University +^	4	–	1	–	0	9	–	4	–	0
Connecticut +	4	–	1	–	0	5	–	6	–	0
No. 20 New Hampshire	3	–	2	–	0	7	–	3	–	0
Rhode Island	2	–	3	–	0	6	–	4	–	0
UMass	2	–	3	–	0	3	–	8	–	0
Maine	0	–	5	–	0	4	–	6	–	0
+ – Conference co-champions; ^ – NCAA Division I-AA playoff participant; Rankings from NCAA Division I-AA Football Committee poll

The 1983 Maine Black Bears football team represented the University of Maine as a member of the Yankee Conference during the 1983 NCAA Division I-AA football season. Led by third-year head coach Ron Rogerson, the Black Bears compiled an overall record of 4–6 with a conference mark of 0–5, placing last out of six teams in the Yankee Conference.

== Schedule ==
Date	Opponent	Site	Result	Attendance	Source
September 17	at Rhode Island	Meade Stadium; Kingston, RI	L 16–24	8,456	
September 24	No. 19 Boston University	Alumni Field; Orono, ME	L 14–28		
October 1	Towson State*	Alumni Field; Orono, ME	W 23–16		
October 8	at No. 12 Lafayette*	Fisher Stadium; Easton, PA	W 39–38	6,800	
October 15	at UMass	Alumni Stadium; Hadley, MA	L 7–17	8,327	
October 22	Connecticut	Alumni Stadium; Orono, ME	L 26–31		
October 29	at Northeastern*	Parsons Field; Brookline, MA	W 17–14	6,250	
November 5	New Hampshire	Alumni Field; Orono, ME	L 7–20		
November 12	at VMI*	Alumni Memorial Field; Lexington, VA	L 12–14		
November 19	Springfield*	Alumni Field; Orono, ME	W 62–6		
*Non-conference game; Rankings from NCAA Division I-AA Football Committee Poll released prior to the game
