= 1983 Cornell Big Red football team =

American college football season

1983 Cornell Big Red football
- Conference: Ivy League
- Record: 3–6–1 (3–3–1 Ivy)
- Head coach: Maxie Baughan (1st season)
- Captains: Frank Farace; Mark Miller; Mike Scully
- Home stadium: Schoellkopf Field

1983 Ivy League football standings
| | Conf. | | | | | Overall |
| Team | W | | L | | T | W | | L | | T |
|---|---|---|---|---|---|---|---|---|---|---|
| Harvard + | 5 | – | 1 | – | 1 | 6 | – | 2 | – | 2 |
| Penn + | 5 | – | 1 | – | 1 | 6 | – | 3 | – | 1 |
| Brown | 4 | – | 2 | – | 1 | 4 | – | 5 | – | 1 |
| Dartmouth | 4 | – | 2 | – | 1 | 4 | – | 5 | – | 1 |
| Cornell | 3 | – | 3 | – | 1 | 3 | – | 6 | – | 1 |
| Princeton | 2 | – | 5 | – | 0 | 4 | – | 6 | – | 0 |
| Columbia | 1 | – | 5 | – | 1 | 1 | – | 7 | – | 2 |
| Yale | 1 | – | 6 | – | 0 | 1 | – | 9 | – | 0 |
+ – Conference co-champions

The 1983 Cornell Big Red football team was an American football team that represented Cornell University during the 1983 NCAA Division I-AA football season. Cornell finished fifth in the Ivy League.

In its first season under head coach Maxie Baughan, the team compiled a 3–6–1 record and was outscored 268 to 161. Brad Decker and Frank Farace, Mark Miller and Mike Scully were the team captains.

Cornell's 3–3–1 conference record placed fifth in the Ivy League standings. The Big Red outscored Ivy opponents 134 to 119.

Cornell played its home games at Schoellkopf Field in Ithaca, New York.

== Schedule ==
| Date | Opponent | Site | Result | Attendance | Source |
|---|---|---|---|---|---|
| September 17 | at Penn | Franklin Field; Philadelphia, PA (rivalry) | L 7–28 | 21,003 | |
| September 24 | No. 4 Colgate* | Schoellkopf Field; Ithaca, NY (rivalry) | L 7–60 | 15,100 | |
| October 1 | at Cincinnati* | Riverfront Stadium; Cincinnati, OH | L 20–48 | 13,840 | |
| October 8 | Harvard | Schoellkopf Field; Ithaca, NY | T 3–3 | 11,350 | |
| October 15 | at Brown | Brown Stadium; Providence, RI | L 3–14 | 10,750 | |
| October 22 | at Dartmouth | Memorial Field; Hanover, NH (rivalry) | L 17–31 | 13,547 | |
| October 29 | at Boston University* | Nickerson Field; Boston, MA | L 0–41 | 2,228 | |
| November 5 | Yale | Schoellkopf Field; Ithaca, NY | W 41–7 | 12,100 | |
| November 12 | Columbia | Schoellkopf Field; Ithaca, NY (rivalry) | W 31–6 | 3,500 | |
| November 19 | at Princeton | Palmer Stadium; Princeton, NJ | W 32–30 | 9,170 | |
*Non-conference game; Rankings from the latest NCAA Division I-AA poll released prior to the game
