= 1983 UMass Minutemen football team =

American college football season

1983 UMass Minutemen football
- Conference: Yankee Conference
- Record: 3–8 (2–3 Yankee)
- Head coach: Bob Pickett (6th season)
- Defensive coordinator: Jim Reid (6th season)
- Home stadium: Alumni Stadium

1983 Yankee Conference football standings
	Conf.					Overall
Team	W		L		T	W		L		T
No. T–13 Boston University +^	4	–	1	–	0	9	–	4	–	0
Connecticut +	4	–	1	–	0	5	–	6	–	0
No. 20 New Hampshire	3	–	2	–	0	7	–	3	–	0
Rhode Island	2	–	3	–	0	6	–	4	–	0
UMass	2	–	3	–	0	3	–	8	–	0
Maine	0	–	5	–	0	4	–	6	–	0
+ – Conference co-champions; ^ – NCAA Division I-AA playoff participant; Rankings from NCAA Division I-AA Football Committee poll

The 1983 UMass Minutemen football team represented the University of Massachusetts Amherst in the 1983 NCAA Division I-AA football season as a member of the Yankee Conference. The team was coached by Bob Pickett and played its home games at Alumni Stadium in Hadley, Massachusetts. The 1983 season was Pickett's last as coach of the Minutemen, who won four conference championships and appeared in the National Championship Game once during his tenure. UMass finished the season with a record of 3–8 overall and 2–3 in conference play.

== Schedule ==
Date	Opponent	Site	Result	Attendance	Source
September 10	at Toledo*	Glass Bowl; Toledo, OH	L 13–45	20,061	
September 17	Holy Cross*	Alumni Stadium; Hadley, MA	L 0–17	13,591	
September 24	at Harvard*	Harvard Stadium; Boston, MA	W 21–7	12,500	
October 1	Rhode Island	Alumni Stadium; Hadley, MA	L 3–13	6,831	
October 8	at Delaware*	Delaware Stadium; Newark, DE	L 13–16	19,737	
October 15	Maine	Alumni Stadium; Hadley, MA	W 17–7	8,327	
October 22	No. 20 Boston University	Alumni Stadium; Hadley, MA	W 24–21	11,210	
October 29	at Connecticut	Memorial Stadium; Storrs, CT (rivalry)	L 6–16	14,546	
November 5	at Lehigh*	Taylor Stadium; Bethlehem, PA	L 20–21	14,000	
November 12	at New Hampshire	Cowell Stadium; Durham, NH (rivalry)	L 10–35	6,300	
November 19	at Northeastern*	Parsons Field; Brookline, MA	L 14–31	4,200	
*Non-conference game; Rankings from NCAA Division I-AA Football Committee Poll released prior to the game
