= 1983 Connecticut Huskies football team =

American college football season

1983 Connecticut Huskies football

Yankee Conference co-champion
- Conference: Yankee Conference
- Record: 5–6 (4–1 Yankee)
- Head coach: Tom Jackson (1st season)
- Home stadium: Memorial Stadium

1983 Yankee Conference football standings
	Conf.					Overall
Team	W		L		T	W		L		T
No. T–13 Boston University +^	4	–	1	–	0	9	–	4	–	0
Connecticut +	4	–	1	–	0	5	–	6	–	0
No. 20 New Hampshire	3	–	2	–	0	7	–	3	–	0
Rhode Island	2	–	3	–	0	6	–	4	–	0
UMass	2	–	3	–	0	3	–	8	–	0
Maine	0	–	5	–	0	4	–	6	–	0
+ – Conference co-champions; ^ – NCAA Division I-AA playoff participant; Rankings from NCAA Division I-AA Football Committee poll

The 1983 Connecticut Huskies football team represented the University of Connecticut in the 1983 NCAA Division I-AA football season. The Huskies were led by first-year head coach Tom Jackson, and completed the season with a record of 5–6.

== Schedule ==
Date	Opponent	Site	Result	Attendance	Source
September 10	at Rutgers*	Rutgers Stadium; Piscataway, NJ	L 5–22	15,283	
September 17	at Northeastern*	Parsons Field; Brookline, MA	L 7–28	4,100	
September 24	at Yale*	Yale Bowl; New Haven, CT	W 38–12	29,066	
October 1	New Hampshire	Memorial Stadium; Storrs, CT	W 9–7	7,428	
October 8	Lehigh*	Taylor Stadium; Bethlehem, PA	L 7–13	12,000	
October 15	No. 4 Holy Cross*	Memorial Stadium; Storrs, CT	L 16–20	13,090	
October 22	at Maine	Alumni Field; Orono, ME	W 31–26		
October 29	UMass	Memorial Stadium; Storrs, CT (rivalry)	W 16–6	14,546	
November 5	at Boston University	Nickerson Field; Boston, MA	L 7–17		
November 12	at Rhode Island	Meade Stadium; Kingston, RI (rivalry)	W 18–17	6,764	
November 19	No. 12 Colgate*	Memorial Stadium; Storrs, CT	L 33–41	5,814	
*Non-conference game; Rankings from NCAA Division I-AA Football Committee Poll released prior to the game

== After the season ==
=== NFL draft ===
The following Husky was selected in the National Football League draft following the season.

Round	Pick	Player	Position	NFL club
4	99	John Dorsey	Linebacker	Green Bay Packers
