= 1983 South Carolina State Bulldogs football team =

American college football season

1983 South Carolina State Bulldogs football

MEAC champion
- Conference: Mid-Eastern Athletic Conference
- Record: 7–3 (4–0 MEAC)
- Head coach: Bill Davis (5th season)
- Defensive coordinator: Oliver Pough (3rd season)
- Home stadium: State College Stadium

1983 Mid-Eastern Athletic Conference football standings
	Conf.					Overall
Team	W		L		T	W		L		T
No. 18 South Carolina State $	4	–	0	–	0	7	–	3	–	0
Delaware State	3	–	1	–	0	7	–	3	–	1
Bethune–Cookman	1	–	3	–	0	4	–	4	–	1
North Carolina A&T	1	–	3	–	0	3	–	7	–	1
Howard	1	–	3	–	0	1	–	9	–	0
Florida A&M	0	–	0	–	0	7	–	4	–	0
$ – Conference champion; ^ – NCAA Division I-AA playoff participant; Florida A&M games did not count as conference games; Rankings from NCAA Division I-AA Football Committee poll

The 1983 South Carolina State Bulldogs football team represented South Carolina State College (now known as South Carolina State University) as a member of the Mid-Eastern Athletic Conference (MEAC) during the 1983 NCAA Division I-AA football season. Led by fifth-year head coach Bill Davis, the Bulldogs compiled an overall record of 7–3, with a mark of 4–0 in conference play, and finished as MEAC champion.

== Schedule ==
Date	Opponent	Rank	Site	Result	Attendance	Source
September 3	Furman*		State College Stadium; Orangeburg, SC	W 13–3	14,823	
September 10	Delaware State		State College Stadium; Orangeburg, SC	W 24–17	9,250	
September 17	North Carolina A&T		State College Stadium; Orangeburg, SC (rivalry)	W 45–7	10,195	
September 24	at Howard	No. 1	Howard Stadium; Washington, D.C.	W 28–7	10,000	
October 1	at Alcorn State*	No. T–1	Henderson Stadium; Lorman, MS	L 13–18	7,103	
October 8	Johnson C. Smith*	No. 7	State College Stadium; Orangeburg, SC	W 23–14	17,587	
October 15	at Davidson*	No. 6	Richardson Stadium; Davidson, NC	W 19–7	4,600	
October 22	at Florida A&M*	No. 5	Bragg Memorial Stadium; Tallahassee, FL	L 14–17		
November 5	Bethune–Cookman	No. T–7	State College Stadium; Orangeburg, SC	W 28–7		
November 12	at No. 13 Grambling State*	No. 7	Eddie G. Robinson Memorial Stadium; Grambling, LA	L 3–14	10,316	
*Non-conference game; Rankings from NCAA Division I-AA Football Committee Poll released prior to the game
