= 1983 Yale Bulldogs football team =

American college football season

1983 Yale Bulldogs football
- Conference: Ivy League
- Record: 1–9 (1–6 Ivy)
- Head coach: Carmen Cozza (19th season)
- Home stadium: Yale Bowl

1983 Ivy League football standings
| | Conf. | | | | | Overall |
| Team | W | | L | | T | W | | L | | T |
|---|---|---|---|---|---|---|---|---|---|---|
| Harvard + | 5 | – | 1 | – | 1 | 6 | – | 2 | – | 2 |
| Penn + | 5 | – | 1 | – | 1 | 6 | – | 3 | – | 1 |
| Brown | 4 | – | 2 | – | 1 | 4 | – | 5 | – | 1 |
| Dartmouth | 4 | – | 2 | – | 1 | 4 | – | 5 | – | 1 |
| Cornell | 3 | – | 3 | – | 1 | 3 | – | 6 | – | 1 |
| Princeton | 2 | – | 5 | – | 0 | 4 | – | 6 | – | 0 |
| Columbia | 1 | – | 5 | – | 1 | 1 | – | 7 | – | 2 |
| Yale | 1 | – | 6 | – | 0 | 1 | – | 9 | – | 0 |
+ – Conference co-champions

The 1983 Yale Bulldogs football team represented Yale University in the 1983 NCAA Division I-AA football season. The Bulldogs were led by 19th-year head coach Carmen Cozza, played their home games at the Yale Bowl and finished last in the Ivy League with a 1–6 record, 1–9 overall.

By finishing last in the Ivy League, this Yale team would be the last team for the next five years to place below Columbia in the standings, as the Lions embarked on a 44-game losing streak, at the time the longest in NCAA Division I history. Columbia's October 15 date at the Yale Bowl would also serve as the program's final win before the start of the streak, which would encompass all of the 1984–1987 seasons. Columbia would not win another game until October 8, 1988.

== Schedule ==
| Date | Opponent | Site | Result | Attendance | Source |
|---|---|---|---|---|---|
| September 17 | Brown | Yale Bowl; New Haven, CT | L 24–26 | 14,037 | |
| September 24 | Connecticut* | Yale Bowl; New Haven, CT | L 12–38 | 29,066 | |
| October 1 | vs. William & Mary* | Foreman Field; Norfolk, VA (Oyster Bowl) | L 14–26 | 20,000 | |
| October 8 | Boston College* | Yale Bowl; New Haven, CT | L 7–42 | 31,108 | |
| October 15 | Columbia | Yale Bowl; New Haven, CT | L 18–21 | 13,523 | |
| October 22 | Penn | Yale Bowl; New Haven, CT | L 0–17 | 14,424 | |
| October 29 | Dartmouth | Yale Bowl; New Haven, CT | L 21–24 | 22,007 | |
| November 5 | at Cornell | Schoellkopf Field; Ithaca, NY | L 7–41 | 12,100 | |
| November 12 | at Princeton | Palmer Stadium; Princeton, NJ (rivalry) | W 28–21 | 27,140 | |
| November 19 | Harvard | Yale Bowl; New Haven, CT (The Game) | L 7–16 | 70,097 | |
*Non-conference game

== Roster ==
1983 Yale Bulldogs football team roster
Players
Coaches
Offense

| Pos. | # | Name | Class |
|---|---|---|---|
| OT | 66 | John O'Neill | So |
| TE | 89 | Charlie Parker | Sr |
| WR | 14 | Marc Quinlivan | Jr |
| TE | 85 | Jim Quinn | So |
| QB | 16 | John Quinn | So |

Defense

| Pos. | # | Name | Class |
|---|---|---|---|
| DE | 32 | Kevin Kalinich | Sr |
| LB | 94 | Scott Martin | Jr |
| DB | 21 | Joe Pont | Sr |
| LB | 30 | Bob White | Sr |

Special teams

| Pos. | # | Name | Class |
|---|---|---|---|
| K | 3 | Bill Moore | Jr |

Head coach

- Carmen Cozza

Coordinators/assistant coaches

Legend

- (C) Team captain
- (S) Suspended
- (I) Ineligible
- Injured
- Redshirt
