= 1983 Boston University Terriers football team =

American college football season

1983 Boston University Terriers football

Yankee Conference co-champion

NCAA Division I-AA Quarterfinal, L 16–35 at Furman
- Conference: Yankee Conference
- Record: 9–4 (4–1 Yankee)
- Head coach: Rick Taylor (7th season)
- Offensive coordinator: Buddy Teevens (3rd season)
- Defensive coordinator: Ed Sweeney (6th season)
- Home stadium: Nickerson Field

1983 Yankee Conference football standings
	Conf.					Overall
Team	W		L		T	W		L		T
No. T–13 Boston University +^	4	–	1	–	0	9	–	4	–	0
Connecticut +	4	–	1	–	0	5	–	6	–	0
No. 20 New Hampshire	3	–	2	–	0	7	–	3	–	0
Rhode Island	2	–	3	–	0	6	–	4	–	0
UMass	2	–	3	–	0	3	–	8	–	0
Maine	0	–	5	–	0	4	–	6	–	0
+ – Conference co-champions; ^ – NCAA Division I-AA playoff participant; Rankings from NCAA Division I-AA Football Committee poll

The 1983 Boston University Terriers football team was an American football team that represented Boston University as a member of the Yankee Conference during the 1983 NCAA Division I-AA football season. In their seventh season under head coach Rick Taylor, the Terriers compiled a 9–4 record (4–1 against conference opponents), tied for the conference championship, lost to Furman in the quarterfinals of the NCAA Division I-AA Football Championship playoffs, and outscored opponents by a total of 315 to 198.

== Schedule ==
Date	Opponent	Rank	Site	Result	Attendance	Source
September 10	at Holy Cross*		Fitton Field; Worcester, MA	L 3–14	15,231	
September 17	New Hampshire		Nickerson Field; Boston, MA	W 13–3	3,597	
September 24	at Maine	No. 19	Alumni Field; Orono, ME	W 28–14		
October 1	at No. 3 Colgate*	No. 19	Andy Kerr Stadium; Hamilton, NY	L 17–34	8,000	
October 8	at Richmond*		University of Richmond Stadium; Richmond, VA	W 26–17	7,110	
October 15	Rhode Island		Nickerson Field; Boston, MA	W 24–22	7,343	
October 22	at UMass	No. 20	Alumni Stadium; Hadley, MA	L 21–24	11,210	
October 29	Cornell*		Nickerson Field; Boston, MA	W 41–0	2,228	
November 5	Connecticut		Nickerson Field; Boston, MA	W 17–7		
November 12	Bucknell*	No. 17	Nickerson Field; Boston, MA	W 35–8	1,612	
November 19	Morgan State*	No. 15	Nickerson Field; Boston, MA	W 50–0		
November 27	at No. 8 Eastern Kentucky*	No. T–13	Hanger Field; Richmond, KY (NCAA Division I-AA First Round)	W 24–20	4,800	
December 3	at No. 2 Furman*	No. T–13	Paladin Stadium; Greenville, SC (NCAA Division I-AA Quarterfinal)	L 16–35	7,879	
*Non-conference game; Rankings from NCAA Division I-AA Football Committee Poll released prior to the game
