= 1983 Holy Cross Crusaders football team =

American college football season

1983 Holy Cross Crusaders football

NCAA Division I-AA Quarterfinal, L 21–28 vs. Western Carolina
- Conference: Independent
- Record: 9–2–1
- Head coach: Rick E. Carter (3rd season)
- Defensive coordinator: Mark Duffner (3rd season)
- Captains: Harry Flaherty; Matt Martin; Rob Porter
- Home stadium: Fitton Field

1983 NCAA Division I-AA independents football standings
	Conf.			Overall
Team	W	L	T	W		L		T
No. 3 Holy Cross ^		–		9	–	1	–	1
No. 17 Tennessee State		–		8	–	2	–	1
No. 7 Colgate ^		–		8	–	3	–	0
Lehigh		–		8	–	3	–	0
Lafayette		–		6	–	4	–	0
Northeastern		–		6	–	4	–	1
Southeastern Louisiana		–		6	–	5	–	0
William & Mary		–		6	–	5	–	0
Nicholls State		–		5	–	6	–	0
Bucknell		–		4	–	5	–	1
Delaware		–		4	–	7	–	0
Northwestern State		–		4	–	7	–	0
James Madison		–		3	–	8	–	0
Richmond		–		3	–	8	–	0
Western Kentucky		–		2	–	8	–	1
^ – NCAA Division I-AA playoff participant; Rankings from NCAA Division I-AA Football Committee poll

The 1983 Holy Cross Crusaders football team was an American football team that represented the College of the Holy Cross as an independent during the 1983 NCAA Division I-AA football season. The Crusaders ranked No. 3 nationally but lost in the quarterfinals of the Division I-AA playoff.

In their third year under head coach Rick E. Carter, the Crusaders compiled a 9–2–1 record (9–1–1 regular season). Harry Flaherty, Matt Martin and Rob Porter were the team captains.

An eight-game winning streak to open the campaign saw Holy Cross steadily climb in the weekly national rankings, reaching No. 1 in time for their last regular-season game. After suffering their first loss of the year in that season-ender—to Division I-A Boston College, in a game played at the New England Patriots' home stadium—the Crusaders dropped to No. 3 in the Division I-AA rankings, and earned a playoff first-round bye before being eliminated in the second round.

Holy Cross played its home games, including its first-ever home playoff game, at Fitton Field on the college campus in Worcester, Massachusetts.

== Schedule ==
Date	Opponent	Rank	Site	Result	Attendance	Source
September 10	Boston University		Fitton Field; Worcester, MA	W 14–3	15,231	
September 17	at UMass		Alumni Stadium; Hadley, MA	W 17–0	13,591	
September 24	at New Hampshire	No. 12	Cowell Stadium; Durham, NH	W 42–30	10,000	
October 1	at Dartmouth	No. 9	Memorial Field; Hanover, NH	W 41–14	10,753	
October 8	No. 2 Colgate^{†}	No. 6	Fitton Field; Worcester, MA	W 21–18	21,551	
October 15	at Connecticut	No. 4	Memorial Stadium; Storrs, CT	W 20–16	13,090	
October 22	Brown^	No. 4	Fitton Field; Worcester, MA	W 31–10	16,004	
October 29	Columbia	No. 2	Fitton Field; Worcester, MA	W 77–28	12,861	
November 5	at Harvard	No. 2	Harvard Stadium; Boston, MA	T 10–10	8,000	
November 12	at Delaware	No. 3	Delaware Stadium; Newark, DE	W 24–0	16,432	
November 19	vs. Boston College	No. 1	Sullivan Stadium; Foxborough, MA (rivalry)	L 7–47	38,512	
December 3	No. 9 Western Carolina	No. 3	Fitton Field; Worcester, MA (NCAA Division I-AA Quarterfinal)	L 21–28	10,814	
^{†}Homecoming; ^ Family Weekend; Rankings from the latest NCAA Division I-AA poll released prior to the game
