= 1983 Princeton Tigers football team =

American college football season

1983 Princeton Tigers football
- Conference: Ivy League
- Record: 4–6 (2–5 Ivy)
- Head coach: Frank Navarro (6th season)
- Offensive coordinator: Hank Small (1st season)
- Captains: Steven K. Stearns; Jeffrey J. Urbany
- Home stadium: Palmer Stadium

1983 Ivy League football standings
	Conf.					Overall
Team	W		L		T	W		L		T
Harvard +	5	–	1	–	1	6	–	2	–	2
Penn +	5	–	1	–	1	6	–	3	–	1
Brown	4	–	2	–	1	4	–	5	–	1
Dartmouth	4	–	2	–	1	4	–	5	–	1
Cornell	3	–	3	–	1	3	–	6	–	1
Princeton	2	–	5	–	0	4	–	6	–	0
Columbia	1	–	5	–	1	1	–	7	–	2
Yale	1	–	6	–	0	1	–	9	–	0
+ – Conference co-champions

The 1983 Princeton Tigers football team was an American football team that represented Princeton University during the 1983 NCAA Division I-AA football season. Princeton finished sixth in the Ivy League.

In their sixth year under head coach Frank Navarro, the Tigers compiled a 4–6 record but outscored opponents 285 to 277. Steven K. Stearns and Jeffrey J. Urbany were the team captains.

Princeton's 2–5 conference record placed sixth in the Ivy League standings. The Tigers were outscored 179 to 169 by Ivy opponents.

Princeton played its home games at Palmer Stadium on the university campus in Princeton, New Jersey.

== Schedule ==
Date	Opponent	Site	Result	Attendance	Source
September 17	at Dartmouth	Memorial Field; Hanover, NH	L 3–21	10,022	
September 24	Bucknell*	Palmer Stadium; Princeton, NJ	W 46–28	10,170	
October 1	at Brown	Brown Stadium; Providence, RI	W 27–16	10,009	
October 8	Columbia	Palmer Stadium; Princeton, NJ	W 35–26	12,240	
October 15	Navy*	Palmer Stadium; Princeton, NJ	L 29–37	21,730	
October 22	at Harvard	Harvard Stadium; Boston, MA (rivalry)	L 26–28	15,500	
October 29	at Penn	Franklin Field; Philadelphia, PA (rivalry)	L 27–28	36,579	
November 5	Lafayette*	Palmer Stadium; Princeton, NJ	W 41–33	10,117	
November 12	Yale	Palmer Stadium; Princeton, NJ (rivalry)	L 21–28	27,140	
November 19	Cornell	Palmer Stadium; Princeton, NJ	L 30–32	9,170	
*Non-conference game
