= 1983 Nicholls State Colonels football team =

American college football season

1983 Nicholls State Colonels football
- Conference: Independent
- Record: 5–6
- Head coach: Sonny Jackson (3rd season)
- Home stadium: John L. Guidry Stadium

1983 NCAA Division I-AA independents football standings
	Conf.			Overall
Team	W	L	T	W		L		T
No. 3 Holy Cross ^		–		9	–	1	–	1
No. 17 Tennessee State		–		8	–	2	–	1
No. 7 Colgate ^		–		8	–	3	–	0
Lehigh		–		8	–	3	–	0
Lafayette		–		6	–	4	–	0
Northeastern		–		6	–	4	–	1
Southeastern Louisiana		–		6	–	5	–	0
William & Mary		–		6	–	5	–	0
Nicholls State		–		5	–	6	–	0
Bucknell		–		4	–	5	–	1
Delaware		–		4	–	7	–	0
Northwestern State		–		4	–	7	–	0
James Madison		–		3	–	8	–	0
Richmond		–		3	–	8	–	0
Western Kentucky		–		2	–	8	–	1
^ – NCAA Division I-AA playoff participant; Rankings from NCAA Division I-AA Football Committee poll

The 1983 Nicholls State Colonels football team represented Nicholls State University as an independent during the 1983 NCAA Division I-AA football season. Led by third-year head coach Sonny Jackson, the Colonels compiled a record of 5–6. Nicholls State played home games at John L. Guidry Stadium in Thibodaux, Louisiana.

== Schedule ==
Date	Opponent	Rank	Site	Result	Attendance	Source
September 3	Lamar		John L. Guidry Stadium; Thibodaux, LA	W 21–14		
September 10	at Troy State		Veterans Memorial Stadium; Troy, AL	L 25–33	6,000	
September 24	at No. 2 McNeese State		Cowboy Stadium; Lake Charles, LA	W 30–27	20,000	
October 1	No. 4 Jackson State	No. 18	John L. Guidry Stadium; Thibodaux, LA	L 20–27		
October 8	Southern		John L. Guidry Stadium; Thibodaux, LA	L 20–21		
October 15	at No. 8 Northeast Louisiana		Malone Stadium; Monroe, LA	L 27–47		
October 22	Illinois State		John L. Guidry Stadium; Thibodaux, LA	L 29–34		
October 29	Southwest Missouri State		John L. Guidry Stadium; Thibodaux, LA	W 33–7		
November 5	Northwestern State		John L. Guidry Stadium; Thibodaux, LA (rivalry)	L 21–24		
November 12	at UCF		Florida Citrus Bowl; Orlando, FL	W 37–14	4,520	
November 19	at Southeastern Louisiana		Strawberry Stadium; Hammond, LA (rivalry)	W 6–0	2,000	
Rankings from NCAA Division I-AA Football Committee Poll released prior to the game
