= 1983 UCF Knights football team =

American college football season

1983 UCF Knights football
- Conference: Independent
- Record: 5–6
- Head coach: Lou Saban (1st season)
- Home stadium: Florida Citrus Bowl

1983 NCAA Division II independents football records
	Conf.			Overall
Team	W	L	T	W		L		T
No. 7 Central State (OH) ^		–		12	–	1	–	0
No. 4 Towson State ^		–		10	–	2	–	0
Northern Michigan		–		8	–	2	–	0
Saint Mary's		–		8	–	2	–	0
Southern Connecticut State		–		8	–	2	–	0
Eastern Washington		–		5	–	5	–	0
UCF		–		5	–	6	–	0
Central Connecticut		–		4	–	6	–	0
American International		–		4	–	7	–	0
Springfield		–		3	–	7	–	0
Kentucky State		–		2	–	7	–	2
Morgan State		–		2	–	8	–	0
Liberty		–		2	–	9	–	0
New Haven		–		1	–	9	–	0
^ – NCAA Division II playoff participant; Rankings from NCAA Division II Football Committee poll

The 1983 UCF Knights football season was the fifth season for the team. It was Lou Saban's first as the head coach of the Knights. Looking to bounce back from a winless 1982 season, Saban's 1983 team earned a respectable 5–6 overall record. The Knights competed as an NCAA Division II Independent. The team played their home games at the Citrus Bowl in Downtown Orlando

In their rivalry game against the Bethune–Cookman, the two schools played for short-lived "Interstate 4 Trophy."

On October 29, UCF notched their first victory against a Division I-AA opponent, defeating Austin Peay 10–7.

== Schedule ==
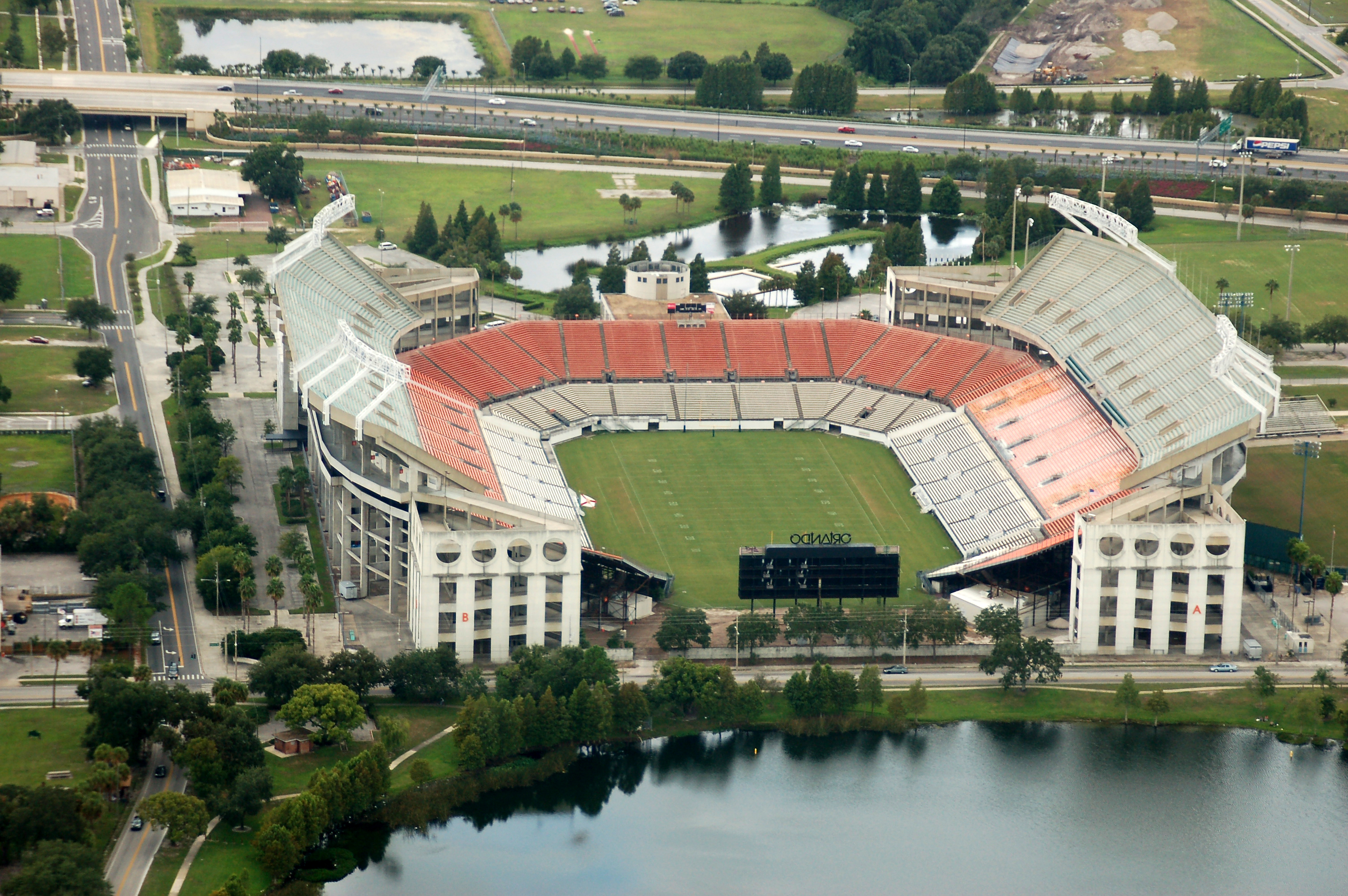
The Florida Citrus Bowl, the Knights' home field

Date	Opponent	Site	Result	Attendance	Source
September 2	Elizabeth City State	Florida Citrus Bowl; Orlando, FL	W 37–7	9,041	
September 10	at Georgia Southern	Womack Stadium; Statesboro, GA	W 33–29	5,815	
September 17	at Southeastern Louisiana	Strawberry Stadium; Hammond, LA	L 28–54	5,000	
September 24	North Alabama	Florida Citrus Bowl; Orlando, FL	L 20–47	8,307	
October 1	Valdosta State	Florida Citrus Bowl; Orlando, FL	W 20–0	12,777	
October 15	at Richmond	City Stadium; Richmond, VA	L 26–31	3,413	
October 29	at Austin Peay	Governors Stadium; Clarksville, TN	W 10–7	7,000	
November 5	at Carson–Newman	Burke–Tarr Stadium; Jefferson City, TN	L 14–35	3,300	
November 12	Nicholls State	Florida Citrus Bowl; Orlando, FL	L 14–37	4,500	
November 19	Fort Lewis	Florida Citrus Bowl; Orlando, FL	W 59–28	14,212	
November 26	Bethune–Cookman	Florida Citrus Bowl; Orlando, FL	L 22–31	13,294	
