= 1983 Penn Quakers football team =

American college football season

1983 Penn Quakers football

Ivy League co-champion
- Conference: Ivy League
- Record: 6–3–1 (5–1–1 Ivy)
- Head coach: Jerry Berndt (3rd season)
- Captains: Marc Hembrough; Bill Lista
- Home stadium: Franklin Field

1983 Ivy League football standings
	Conf.					Overall
Team	W		L		T	W		L		T
Harvard +	5	–	1	–	1	6	–	2	–	2
Penn +	5	–	1	–	1	6	–	3	–	1
Brown	4	–	2	–	1	4	–	5	–	1
Dartmouth	4	–	2	–	1	4	–	5	–	1
Cornell	3	–	3	–	1	3	–	6	–	1
Princeton	2	–	5	–	0	4	–	6	–	0
Columbia	1	–	5	–	1	1	–	7	–	2
Yale	1	–	6	–	0	1	–	9	–	0
+ – Conference co-champions

The 1983 Penn Quakers football team represented the University of Pennsylvania in the 1983 NCAA Division I-AA football season. They finished with a 6–3–1 record and were the Ivy League co-champions with Harvard, whom they defeated in the next-to-last week of the season.

== Schedule ==
Date	Opponent	Rank	Site	Result	Attendance	Source
September 17	Cornell		Franklin Field; Philadelphia, PA (rivalry)	W 28–7	21,003	
September 24	at Delaware*		Delaware Stadium; Newark, DE	L 7–40	17,568	
September 30	vs. Columbia		Giants Stadium; East Rutherford, NJ	W 35–10	7,221	
October 8	Brown		Franklin Field; Philadelphia, PA	T 24–24	14,576	
October 15	No. 17 Lafayette*		Franklin Field; Philadelphia, PA	W 28–20	6,038	
October 22	at Yale		Yale Bowl; New Haven, CT	W 17–0	14,424	
October 29	Princeton		Franklin Field; Philadelphia, PA (rivalry)	W 28–27	36,579	
November 5	No. T–18 Colgate*	No. 16	Franklin Field; Philadelphia, PA	L 20–34	6,921	
November 12	at Harvard		Harvard Stadium; Boston, MA (rivalry)	L 0–28	12,000	
November 19	Dartmouth		Franklin Field; Philadelphia, PA	W 38–14	28,416	
*Non-conference game; Rankings from NCAA Division I-AA Football Committee Poll released prior to the game
