= 1983 Tennessee State Tigers football team =

American college football season

1983 Tennessee State Tigers football

Black college national champion
- Conference: Independent
- Record: 8–2–1
- Head coach: John Merritt (21st season)
- Home stadium: Hale Stadium; Vanderbilt Stadium

1983 NCAA Division I-AA independents football standings
| | Conf. | | | Overall |
| Team | W | L | T | W | | L | | T |
|---|---|---|---|---|---|---|---|---|
| No. 3 Holy Cross ^ | | – | | 9 | – | 1 | – | 1 |
| No. 17 Tennessee State | | – | | 8 | – | 2 | – | 1 |
| No. 7 Colgate ^ | | – | | 8 | – | 3 | – | 0 |
| Lehigh | | – | | 8 | – | 3 | – | 0 |
| Lafayette | | – | | 6 | – | 4 | – | 0 |
| Northeastern | | – | | 6 | – | 4 | – | 1 |
| Southeastern Louisiana | | – | | 6 | – | 5 | – | 0 |
| William & Mary | | – | | 6 | – | 5 | – | 0 |
| Nicholls State | | – | | 5 | – | 6 | – | 0 |
| Bucknell | | – | | 4 | – | 5 | – | 1 |
| Delaware | | – | | 4 | – | 7 | – | 0 |
| Northwestern State | | – | | 4 | – | 7 | – | 0 |
| James Madison | | – | | 3 | – | 8 | – | 0 |
| Richmond | | – | | 3 | – | 8 | – | 0 |
| Western Kentucky | | – | | 2 | – | 8 | – | 1 |
^ – NCAA Division I-AA playoff participant; Rankings from NCAA Division I-AA Football Committee poll

The 1983 Tennessee State Tigers football team represented Tennessee State University as an independent during the 1983 NCAA Division I-AA football season. Led by 21st-year head coach John Merritt, the Tigers compiled an overall record of 8–2–1. At the conclusion of the season, the Tigers were also recognized as black college national champion.

== Schedule ==
| Date | Opponent | Rank | Site | Result | Attendance | Source |
|---|---|---|---|---|---|---|
| September 3 | Hampton | | Hale Stadium; Nashville, TN | W 20–14 | 14,000 | |
| September 10 | at Jackson State | | Mississippi Veterans Memorial Stadium; Jackson, MS | L 31–35 | | |
| September 17 | at Alabama A&M | | Milton Frank Stadium; Huntsville, AL | W 40–28 | 10,000 | |
| September 24 | at Florida A&M | No. 16 | Bragg Memorial Stadium; Tallahassee, FL | W 23–13 | | |
| October 1 | Alabama State | No. 13 | Hale Stadium; Nashville, TN | W 52–19 | | |
| October 8 | No. T–14 Grambling State | No. 8 | Vanderbilt Stadium; Nashville, TN | T 7–7 | 40,000 | |
| October 22 | vs. Bethune–Cookman | No. 12 | Florida Citrus Bowl; Orlando, FL | W 21–19 | 6,500 | |
| October 29 | at Southern | No. 13 | A. W. Mumford Stadium; Baton Rouge, LA | W 49–24 | | |
| November 5 | District of Columbia | No. 8 | Hale Stadium; Nashville, TN | W 55–6 | 4,000 | |
| November 12 | vs. Mississippi Valley State | No. 12 | Liberty Bowl Memorial Stadium; Memphis, TN (Bluff City Classic) | L 38–51 | 15,000 | |
| November 19 | at North Carolina A&T | No. 18 | Aggie Stadium; Greensboro, NC | W 57–0 | 7,625 | |
Rankings from NCAA Division I-AA Football Committee Poll released prior to the game
