= 1983 Navy Midshipmen football team =

American college football season

1983 Navy Midshipmen football
- Conference: Independent
- Record: 2nd
- Head coach: Gary Tranquill (1st season)
- Captains: Jeff Johnson; Andy Ponseigo
- Home stadium: Navy–Marine Corps Memorial Stadium

1983 NCAA Division I-A independents football records
	Conf.					Overall
Team	W		L		T	W		L		T
No. 1 Miami (FL)		–		–		11	–	1	–	0
Virginia Tech		–		–		9	–	2	–	0
No. 19 Boston College		–		–		9	–	3	–	0
No. 16 West Virginia		–		–		9	–	3	–	0
No. 20 East Carolina		–		–		8	–	3	–	0
No. 18 Pittsburgh		–		–		8	–	3	–	1
Florida State		–		–		8	–	4	–	0
Penn State		–		–		8	–	4	–	1
Southern Miss		–		–		7	–	4	–	0
Memphis State		–		–		6	–	4	–	1
Notre Dame		–		–		7	–	5	–	0
Syracuse		–		–		6	–	5	–	0
South Carolina		–		–		5	–	6	–	0
Cincinnati			–			4	–	6	–	1
Southwestern Louisiana		–		–		4	–	6	–	0
Temple		–		–		4	–	7	–	0
Tulane		–		–		4	–	7	–	0
Louisville		–		–		3	–	8	–	0
Navy		–		–		3	–	8	–	0
Rutgers		–		–		3	–	8	–	0
Army		–		–		2	–	9	–	0
Rankings from AP Poll

The 1983 Navy Midshipmen football team represented the United States Naval Academy (USNA) as an independent during the 1983 NCAA Division I-A football season. The team was led by second-year head coach Gary Tranquill.

== Schedule ==
Date	Time	Opponent	Site	Result	Attendance	Source
September 10		at Virginia	Scott Stadium; Charlottesville, VA	L 16–27	33,847	
September 17		at Mississippi State	Mississippi Veterans Memorial Stadium; Jackson, MS	L 10–38	45,211	
September 24		Lehigh	Navy–Marine Corps Memorial Stadium; Annapolis, MD	W 30–0	23,000	
October 1		at Washington	Husky Stadium; Seattle, WA	L 10–27	59,912	
October 8		Air Force	Navy–Marine Corps Memorial Stadium; Annapolis, MD (Commander-in-Chief's Trophy)	L 17–44	34,257	
October 15		at Princeton	Palmer Stadium; Princeton, NJ	W 37–29	21,730	
October 22	1:30 p.m.	Pittsburgh^{†}	Navy–Marine Corps Memorial Stadium; Annapolis, MD	L 14–21	33,349	
October 29	12:00 p.m.	at Notre Dame	Notre Dame Stadium; Notre Dame, IN (rivalry)	L 12–28	59,075	
November 5		Syracuse	Navy–Marine Corps Memorial Stadium; Annapolis, MD	L 7–14	22,009	
November 12		at South Carolina	Williams–Brice Stadium; Columbia, SC	L 7–31	64,800	
November 25		vs. Army	Rose Bowl; Pasadena, CA (Army–Navy Game)	W 42–13	81,347	
^{†}Homecoming; All times are in Eastern time

== Roster ==
1983 Navy Midshipmen football team roster
Players
Coaches
Offense

Pos.	#	Name	Class
RB		Marc Alexander
WR		Greg Blanchard
WR		Greg Brand
QB		Sean Cannon
RB		Bryan Caraveo
WR		Bill Cebak
RB		Rich Clouse
OL		Rich Coombs
OL		Bob Dill
OL		Bob Goodman
WR		Ken Heine
OL		Mark Long
RB	30	Napoleon McCallum	Jr
RB		Ron McDonald
QB		Adam Meinrod
OL		Pete Oswald
OL		Doug Rhodes
RB		Jim Scannell
TE		Gregory Schildmeyer
TE		Mark Stevens
OL		Bill Weidenhammer
WR		Chris Weiler
QB		Rick Williamson

Defense

Pos.	#	Name	Class
DB		Steve Brady
DB		Kurt Dixon
LB		Tom Doman
LB		Todd Hastings
DL		George Herlong
DL		Dirk McFarlane
DL		Hemp Oberle
DL		Rick Pagel
DB		Joe Papetti
DL		Steve Peters
LB		Andy Ponseigo
DB		Eric Rutherford
DB	86	Eric Wallace
DL		Ron Zaleski

Special teams

Pos.	#	Name	Class
P		Mark Colby
K		Todd Solomon
K		Steve Young

Head coach

- Gary Tranquill

Coordinators/assistant coaches

Legend

- (C) Team captain
- (S) Suspended
- (I) Ineligible
- Injured
- Redshirt
