= 1983 Colgate Red Raiders football team =

American college football season

1983 Colgate Red Raiders football

NCAA Division I-AA First Round, L 23–24 vs. Western Carolina
- Conference: Independent
- Record: 8–4
- Head coach: Frederick Dunlap (8th season)
- Captains: Gil Terenzi; Rich White
- Home stadium: Andy Kerr Stadium

1983 NCAA Division I-AA independents football standings
	Conf.			Overall
Team	W	L	T	W		L		T
No. 3 Holy Cross ^		–		9	–	1	–	1
No. 17 Tennessee State		–		8	–	2	–	1
No. 7 Colgate ^		–		8	–	3	–	0
Lehigh		–		8	–	3	–	0
Lafayette		–		6	–	4	–	0
Northeastern		–		6	–	4	–	1
Southeastern Louisiana		–		6	–	5	–	0
William & Mary		–		6	–	5	–	0
Nicholls State		–		5	–	6	–	0
Bucknell		–		4	–	5	–	1
Delaware		–		4	–	7	–	0
Northwestern State		–		4	–	7	–	0
James Madison		–		3	–	8	–	0
Richmond		–		3	–	8	–	0
Western Kentucky		–		2	–	8	–	1
^ – NCAA Division I-AA playoff participant; Rankings from NCAA Division I-AA Football Committee poll

The 1983 Colgate Red Raiders football team was an American football team that represented Colgate University as an independent during the 1983 NCAA Division I-AA football season. Colgate ranked No. 7 nationally and qualified for the Division I-AA playoffs for the second year in a row, but lost in the first round.

In its eighth season under head coach Frederick Dunlap, the team compiled an 8–4 record (8–3 regular season). Gil Terenzi and Rich White were the team captains.

A four-game winning streak to open the campaign rocketed the Red Raiders to nearly the top of the weekly national rankings, reaching as high as No. 2. They remained in the top 20 for all but one week of the year.

The team played its home games at Andy Kerr Stadium in Hamilton, New York.

== Schedule ==
Date	Opponent	Rank	Site	Result	Attendance	Source
September 10	at Army		Michie Stadium; West Point, NY	W 15–13	33,285	
September 17	Lehigh		Andy Kerr Stadium; Hamilton, NY	W 47–28	6,000	
September 24	at Cornell	No. 4	Schoellkopf Field; Ithaca, NY (rivalry)	W 60–7	15,100	
October 1	No. 19 Boston University	No. 3	Andy Kerr Stadium; Hamilton, NY	W 34–17	8,000	
October 8	at No. 6 Holy Cross	No. 2	Fitton Field; Worcester, MA	L 18–21	21,551	
October 15	at Rutgers	No. 7	Rutgers Stadium; Piscataway, NJ	L 26–29	21,778	
October 22	at Wyoming	No. 13	War Memorial Stadium; Laramie, WY	L 29–49	14,989	
October 29	at Lafayette		Fisher Field; Easton, PA	W 21–7	10,700	
November 5	at No. 16 Penn	No. T–18	Franklin Field; Philadelphia, PA	W 34–20	6,921	
November 12	Richmond	No. 15	Andy Kerr Stadium; Hamilton, NY	W 43–14	4,000	
November 19	at Connecticut	No. 12	Memorial Stadium; Storrs, CT	W 41–33	5,814	
November 26	at No. 9 Western Carolina	No. 7	E.J. Whitmire Stadium; Cullowhee, NC (Division I-AA First Round)	L 23–24	6,500	
Rankings from NCAA Division I-AA Football Committee Poll released prior to the game
