= 1983 New Hampshire Wildcats football team =

American college football season

1983 New Hampshire Wildcats football
- Conference: Yankee Conference
- Record: 7–3 (3–2 Yankee)
- Head coach: Bill Bowes (12th season)
- Home stadium: Cowell Stadium

1983 Yankee Conference football standings
	Conf.					Overall
Team	W		L		T	W		L		T
No. T–13 Boston University +^	4	–	1	–	0	9	–	4	–	0
Connecticut +	4	–	1	–	0	5	–	6	–	0
No. 20 New Hampshire	3	–	2	–	0	7	–	3	–	0
Rhode Island	2	–	3	–	0	6	–	4	–	0
UMass	2	–	3	–	0	3	–	8	–	0
Maine	0	–	5	–	0	4	–	6	–	0
+ – Conference co-champions; ^ – NCAA Division I-AA playoff participant; Rankings from NCAA Division I-AA Football Committee poll

The 1983 New Hampshire Wildcats football team was an American football team that represented the University of New Hampshire as a member of the Yankee Conference during the 1983 NCAA Division I-AA football season. In its twelfth year under head coach Bill Bowes, the team compiled a 7–3 record (3–2 against conference opponents) and finished third out of six teams in the Yankee Conference.

== Schedule ==
Date	Opponent	Site	Result	Attendance	Source
September 10	American International*	Cowell Stadium; Durham, NH	W 31–0	7,723	
September 17	at Boston University	Nickerson Field; Boston, MA	L 3–13	3,597	
September 24	No. 12 Holy Cross*	Cowell Stadium; Durham, NH	L 30–42	10,753	
October 1	at Connecticut	Memorial Stadium; Storrs, CT	L 7–9	7,428	
October 8	at Bucknell*	Memorial Stadium; Lewisburg, PA	W 42–35	5,000	
October 15	Lehigh*	Cowell Stadium; Durham, NH	W 52–28	8,550	
October 22	Northeastern*	Cowell Stadium; Durham, NH	W 24–7	5,000	
October 29	at Rhode Island	Meade Stadium; Kingston, RI	W 14–13	5,890	
November 5	at Maine	Alumni Field; Orono, ME (rivalry)	W 20–7		
November 12	UMass	Cowell Stadium; Durham, NH (rivalry)	W 35–10	6,300	
*Non-conference game; Rankings from Coaches' Poll released prior to the game

== Roster ==
1983 New Hampshire Wildcats football team roster
Players
Coaches
Offense

Pos.	#	Name	Class
OT		John Flanagan	Sr
C		Tom Flanagan	Jr
QB		Rick LeClerc	Jr
WR		Pete O’Donnell	Sr

Defense

Pos.	#	Name	Class
CB		Bob Price	Jr

Special teams

Pos.	#	Name	Class

Head coach

- Bill Bowes

Coordinators/assistant coaches

Legend

- (C) Team captain
- (S) Suspended
- (I) Ineligible
- Injured
- Redshirt
