= Gary Tranquill =

American football player and coach (born 1940)

Biographical details
- Born: April 13, 1940 (age 86); Avella, Pennsylvania, U.S.

Playing career
- 1958–1961: Wittenberg
- Position: Quarterback

Coaching career (HC unless noted)
- 1962–1969: Wittenberg (def. asst.)
- 1970: Ball State (DC)
- 1971–1972: Bowling Green (DC)
- 1973–1976: Navy (QB/WR)
- 1977–1978: Ohio State (DB)
- 1979: West Virginia (DC)
- 1980–1981: West Virginia (OC)
- 1982–1986: Navy
- 1987–1990: Virginia (OC/QB)
- 1991–1993: Cleveland Browns (QB)
- 1994: Virginia Tech (OC)
- 1995–1998: Michigan State (OC/QB)
- 1999–2000: Virginia (OC)
- 2001–2005: North Carolina (OC)
- 2007: Rhein Fire (QB)
- 2009–2010: Boston College (OC)

Head coaching record
- Overall: 20–34–1

Gary Tranquill (born April 13, 1940) is a retired American football coach and former player. He was last the offensive coordinator at Boston College, a position he held until 2010. From 1982 to 1986, Tranquill served as the head football coach at the United States Naval Academy, compiling a record of 20–34–1.

== Playing career ==
Tranquill played college football for four years (1958–1961) as a quarterback at Wittenberg University under head coach and future College Football Hall of Fame inductee, Bill Edwards. Tranquill also lettered in baseball and was inducted into the Wittenberg University Athletics Hall of Honor in 1986.

== Coaching career ==
Tranquill was the 32nd head coach for the United States Naval Academy Midshipmen located in Annapolis, Maryland and he held that position for five seasons, from 1982 until 1986. His coaching record at United States Naval Academy was 20 wins, 34 losses, and 1 tie.

Tranquill then joined the staff of George Welsh, who had preceded him as Navy's head coach, at Virginia. As quarterbacks coach and offensive coordinator, Tranquill coached Cavalier standouts Scott Secules, Shawn Moore, and Matt Blundin. After the 1990 season in which Virginia attained a #1 ranking behind a potent offense, Tranquill became the quarterbacks coach for the Cleveland Browns from 1991 to 1993. He later returned to the college ranks at Virginia Tech, Michigan State, a second stint at Virginia, and finally at North Carolina before his retirement.

Tranquill worked closely with Nick Saban for multiple teams and over several decades.

- Saban served as defensive backs coach at West Virginia in 1979. Tranquill was the defensive coordinator.
- Saban worked under Tranquill as defensive backs coach at Navy in 1982.
- Tranquill worked as the quarterbacks coach for the Cleveland Browns under Bill Belichick from 1991 to 1993 while Saban was defensive coordinator.
- Tranquill served as offensive coordinator and quarterbacks coach under Saban at Michigan State from 1995 to 1998.

After a brief retirement, Tranquill joined the Rhein Fire of NFL Europa where he served as the quarterbacks coach for one season. In January 2009, he was hired by Frank Spaziani to become the offensive coordinator and quarterbacks coach for Boston College. On January 11, 2011 Tranquill retired once again from coaching at the age of 70.

== Head coaching record ==
Year	Team	Overall	Conference	Standing	Bowl/playoffs
Navy Midshipmen (NCAA Division I-A independent) (1982–1986)
1982	Navy	6–5			
1983	Navy	3–8			
1984	Navy	4–6–1			
1985	Navy	4–7			
1986	Navy	3–8			
Navy:		20–34–1			
Total:		20–34–1			
