= 1983 Southeastern Louisiana Lions football team =

American college football season

1983 Southeastern Louisiana Lions football
- Conference: Independent
- Record: 6–5
- Head coach: Oscar Lofton (4th season)
- Home stadium: Strawberry Stadium

1983 NCAA Division I-AA independents football standings
	Conf.			Overall
Team	W	L	T	W		L		T
No. 3 Holy Cross ^		–		9	–	1	–	1
No. 17 Tennessee State		–		8	–	2	–	1
No. 7 Colgate ^		–		8	–	3	–	0
Lehigh		–		8	–	3	–	0
Lafayette		–		6	–	4	–	0
Northeastern		–		6	–	4	–	1
Southeastern Louisiana		–		6	–	5	–	0
William & Mary		–		6	–	5	–	0
Nicholls State		–		5	–	6	–	0
Bucknell		–		4	–	5	–	1
Delaware		–		4	–	7	–	0
Northwestern State		–		4	–	7	–	0
James Madison		–		3	–	8	–	0
Richmond		–		3	–	8	–	0
Western Kentucky		–		2	–	8	–	1
^ – NCAA Division I-AA playoff participant; Rankings from NCAA Division I-AA Football Committee poll

The 1983 Southeastern Louisiana Lions football team was an American football team that represented Southeastern Louisiana University as an independent during the 1983 NCAA Division I-AA football season. Led by fourth-year head coach Oscar Lofton, the Lions compiled an 6–5 record.

== Schedule ==
Date	Opponent	Site	Result	Attendance	Source
September 3	Mississippi College	Strawberry Stadium; Hammond, LA	L 10–16	5,500	
September 10	McNeese State	Strawberry Stadium; Hammond, LA	L 0–23	6,000	
September 17	UCF	Strawberry Stadium; Hammond, LA	W 54–28	5,000	
September 24	East Texas State	Strawberry Stadium; Hammond, LA	W 31–23	5,000	
October 1	at Western Kentucky	L. T. Smith Stadium; Bowling Green, KY	W 27–7	10,500	
October 8	at Troy State	Veterans Memorial Stadium; Troy, AL	W 34–14	4,000	
October 15	at Texas Southern	Robertson Stadium; Houston, TX	W 20–7	4,800	
October 22	No. 6 Northeast Louisiana	Strawberry Stadium; Hammond, LA	L 13–16	7,500	
October 29	No. 6 Jackson State	Strawberry Stadium; Hammond, LA	W 9–7	7,500	
November 12	at Northwestern State	Harry Turpin Stadium; Natchitoches, LA (rivalry)	L 7–23	4,150	
November 19	Nicholls State	Strawberry Stadium; Hammond, LA (rivalry)	L 0–6	2,000	
Rankings from NCAA Division I-AA Football Committee Poll released prior to the game
