= 1983 NCAA Division I-AA football season =

American college football season

1983 NCAA Division I-AA season

Regular season
- Number of teams: 83
- Duration: August–November

Playoff
- Duration: November 27–December 17
- Championship date: December 17, 1983
- Championship site: Johnson Hagood Stadium; Charleston, South Carolina
- Champion: Southern Illinois

NCAA Division I-AA football seasons
- «1982 1984»

The 1983 NCAA Division I-AA football season, part of college football in the United States organized by the National Collegiate Athletic Association at the Division I-AA level, began in August 1983, and concluded with the 1983 NCAA Division I-AA Football Championship Game on December 17, 1983, at Johnson Hagood Stadium in Charleston, South Carolina. The Southern Illinois Salukis won their first I-AA championship, defeating the Western Carolina Catamounts by a score of 43−7.

== Conference changes and new programs ==
- The eight members of the Mid-American Conference temporarily relegated to Division I-AA for the 1982 season returned to Division I-A in 1983.

School	1982 Conference	1983 Conference
Alabama State	Independent (I-AA}	SWAC
Ball State	MAC (I-AA)	MAC (I-A)
Bowling Green	MAC (I-AA)	MAC (I-A)
Eastern Michigan	MAC (I-AA)	MAC (I-A)
Kent State	MAC (I-AA)	MAC (I-A)
Miami (OH)	MAC (I-AA)	MAC (I-A)
North Texas State	I-AA Independent	Southland
Northern Illinois	MAC (I-AA)	MAC (I-A)
Ohio	MAC (I-AA)	MAC (I-A)
Western Michigan	MAC (I-AA)	MAC (I-A)

== Conference standings ==
1983 Association of Mid-Continent Universities football standings
	Conf.					Overall
Team	W		L		T	W		L		T
No. 6 Eastern Illinois $^	3	–	0	–	0	9	–	3	–	0
Southwest Missouri State	2	–	1	–	0	6	–	5	–	0
Northern Iowa	1	–	2	–	0	6	–	5	–	0
Western Illinois	0	–	3	–	0	3	–	8	–	0
$ – Conference champion; ^ – NCAA Division I-AA playoff participant; Rankings from NCAA Division I-AA Football Committee poll

1983 Big Sky Conference football standings
	Conf.					Overall
Team	W		L		T	W		L		T
No. 11 Nevada * $^	6	–	1	–	0	10	–	4	–	0
No. 12 Idaho State ^	5	–	2	–	0	8	–	4	–	0
Idaho	4	–	3	–	0	8	–	3	–	0
Boise State	4	–	3	–	0	6	–	5	–	0
Weber State	3	–	4	–	0	6	–	5	–	0
Montana	3	–	4	–	0	4	–	6	–	0
Northern Arizona	2	–	5	–	0	4	–	7	–	0
Montana State	1	–	6	–	0	1	–	10	–	0
$ – Conference champion; ^ – NCAA Division I-AA playoff participant; * – Nevada was given a win on the Fremont Cannon after UNLV was forced to forfeit the game after an investigation found that ineligible players had participated in the 1983 and 1984 seasons.; Rankings from NCAA Division I-AA Poll

1983 Ivy League football standings
	Conf.					Overall
Team	W		L		T	W		L		T
Harvard +	5	–	1	–	1	6	–	2	–	2
Penn +	5	–	1	–	1	6	–	3	–	1
Brown	4	–	2	–	1	4	–	5	–	1
Dartmouth	4	–	2	–	1	4	–	5	–	1
Cornell	3	–	3	–	1	3	–	6	–	1
Princeton	2	–	5	–	0	4	–	6	–	0
Columbia	1	–	5	–	1	1	–	7	–	2
Yale	1	–	6	–	0	1	–	9	–	0
+ – Conference co-champions

1983 Mid-Eastern Athletic Conference football standings
	Conf.					Overall
Team	W		L		T	W		L		T
No. 18 South Carolina State $	4	–	0	–	0	7	–	3	–	0
Delaware State	3	–	1	–	0	7	–	3	–	1
Bethune–Cookman	1	–	3	–	0	4	–	4	–	1
North Carolina A&T	1	–	3	–	0	3	–	7	–	1
Howard	1	–	3	–	0	1	–	9	–	0
Florida A&M	0	–	0	–	0	7	–	4	–	0
$ – Conference champion; ^ – NCAA Division I-AA playoff participant; Florida A&M games did not count as conference games; Rankings from NCAA Division I-AA Football Committee poll

1983 Missouri Valley Conference football standings
	Conf.					Overall
Team	W		L		T	W		L		T
Tulsa $	5	–	0	–	0	8	–	3	–	0
No. 1 Southern Illinois ^	4	–	1	–	0	13	–	1	–	0
No. 5 Indiana State ^	3	–	2	–	0	9	–	4	–	0
New Mexico State	3	–	2	–	0	5	–	6	–	0
Illinois State	2	–	2	–	1	6	–	4	–	1
Wichita State	3	–	3	–	0	3	–	8	–	0
Drake	1	–	6	–	0	1	–	10	–	0
West Texas State	0	–	5	–	1	0	–	10	–	1
$ – Conference champion; ^ – NCAA Division I-AA playoff participant; The conference was a hybrid of NCAA Division I-A and I-AA programs. New Mexico State, Tulsa, and Wichita State were I-A and the other teams were I-AA.; Rankings from NCAA Division I-AA Football Committee poll

1983 Ohio Valley Conference football standings
	Conf.					Overall
Team	W		L		T	W		L		T
No. 8 Eastern Kentucky $^	6	–	1	–	0	7	–	2	–	1
No. 16 Middle Tennessee	5	–	2	–	0	8	–	2	–	0
Akron	5	–	2	–	0	8	–	3	–	0
Murray State	4	–	3	–	0	7	–	4	–	0
Austin Peay	3	–	4	–	0	6	–	5	–	0
Youngstown State	2	–	5	–	0	4	–	7	–	0
Tennessee Tech	2	–	5	–	0	2	–	8	–	0
Morehead State	1	–	6	–	0	2	–	9	–	0
$ – Conference champion; ^ – NCAA Division I-AA playoff participant; Rankings from NCAA Division I-AA Football Committee poll

1983 Southern Conference football standings
	Conf.					Overall
Team	W		L		T	W		L		T
No. 2 Furman $^	6	–	0	–	1	10	–	2	–	1
No. 9 Western Carolina ^	5	–	0	–	1	11	–	3	–	1
Chattanooga	5	–	2	–	0	7	–	4	–	0
Appalachian State	4	–	3	–	0	6	–	5	–	0
Marshall	3	–	4	–	0	4	–	7	–	0
VMI	1	–	5	–	0	2	–	9	–	0
The Citadel	1	–	6	–	0	3	–	8	–	0
East Tennessee State	1	–	6	–	0	3	–	8	–	0
Davidson	0	–	2	–	0	2	–	8	–	0
$ – Conference champion; ^ – NCAA Division I-AA playoff participant; Rankings from NCAA Division I-AA Football Committee poll

1983 Southland Conference football standings
	Conf.					Overall
Team	W		L		T	W		L		T
No. 13 Northeast Louisiana +	5	–	1	–	0	8	–	3	–	0
No. 4 North Texas State +^	5	–	1	–	0	8	–	4	–	0
McNeese State	3	–	3	–	0	6	–	5	–	0
Arkansas State	3	–	3	–	0	5	–	5	–	1
UT Arlington	2	–	4	–	0	5	–	6	–	0
Louisiana Tech	2	–	4	–	0	4	–	7	–	0
Lamar	1	–	5	–	0	2	–	9	–	0
+ – Conference co-champions; ^ – NCAA Division I-AA playoff participant; Rankings from NCAA Division I-AA Football Committee poll

1983 Southwestern Athletic Conference football standings
	Conf.					Overall
Team	W		L		T	W		L		T
No. 10 Grambling State $	6	–	0	–	1	8	–	1	–	2
No. 15 Jackson State	5	–	2	–	0	8	–	3	–	0
Southern	5	–	2	–	0	7	–	4	–	0
No. 19 Mississippi Valley State	4	–	2	–	1	7	–	2	–	1
Alcorn State	4	–	3	–	0	7	–	3	–	0
Texas Southern	2	–	5	–	0	4	–	6	–	0
Alabama State	0	–	6	–	0	2	–	9	–	0
Prairie View A&M	0	–	6	–	0	0	–	11	–	0
$ – Conference champion; Rankings from NCAA Division I-AA Football Committee poll

1983 Yankee Conference football standings
	Conf.					Overall
Team	W		L		T	W		L		T
No. T–13 Boston University +^	4	–	1	–	0	9	–	4	–	0
Connecticut +	4	–	1	–	0	5	–	6	–	0
No. 20 New Hampshire	3	–	2	–	0	7	–	3	–	0
Rhode Island	2	–	3	–	0	6	–	4	–	0
UMass	2	–	3	–	0	3	–	8	–	0
Maine	0	–	5	–	0	4	–	6	–	0
+ – Conference co-champions; ^ – NCAA Division I-AA playoff participant; Rankings from NCAA Division I-AA Football Committee poll

1983 NCAA Division I-AA independents football standings
	Conf.			Overall
Team	W	L	T	W		L		T
No. 3 Holy Cross ^		–		9	–	1	–	1
No. 17 Tennessee State		–		8	–	2	–	1
No. 7 Colgate ^		–		8	–	3	–	0
Lehigh		–		8	–	3	–	0
Lafayette		–		6	–	4	–	0
Northeastern		–		6	–	4	–	1
Southeastern Louisiana		–		6	–	5	–	0
William & Mary		–		6	–	5	–	0
Nicholls State		–		5	–	6	–	0
Bucknell		–		4	–	5	–	1
Delaware		–		4	–	7	–	0
Northwestern State		–		4	–	7	–	0
James Madison		–		3	–	8	–	0
Richmond		–		3	–	8	–	0
Western Kentucky		–		2	–	8	–	1
^ – NCAA Division I-AA playoff participant; Rankings from NCAA Division I-AA Football Committee poll

== Conference champions ==
Conference champions

Big Sky Conference – Nevada
Ivy League – Harvard and Penn
Mid-Continent Conference – Eastern Illinois
Mid-Eastern Athletic Conference – South Carolina State
Ohio Valley Conference – Eastern Kentucky
Southern Conference – Furman
Southland Conference – North Texas State and Northeast Louisiana
Southwestern Athletic Conference – Grambling State
Yankee Conference – Boston University and Connecticut

== Postseason ==
The top four teams were seeded, and received first-round byes.

=== NCAA Division I-AA playoff bracket ===
First Round; November 26; Campus sites
Indiana State	16**
Eastern Illinois	13
Idaho State	20
Nevada	27
Western Carolina	24
Colgate	23
Eastern Kentucky	20
Boston University	24

Quarterfinals; December 3 Campus sites
(1) Southern Illinois	23
Indiana State	7
(4) North Texas State	17
Nevada	20*
(2) Holy Cross	21
Western Carolina	28
(3) Furman	35
Boston University	16

Semifinals; December 10; Campus sites
(1) Southern Illinois	23
Nevada	7
Western Carolina	14
(3) Furman	7

National Championship Game; December 17; Neutral Site
(1) Southern Illinois	43
Western Carolina	7

* indicates overtime period
