= 1983 Lafayette Leopards football team =

American college football season

1983 Lafayette Leopards football
- Conference: Independent
- Record: 6–5
- Head coach: Bill Russo (3rd season)
- Captains: Rich Doverspike; Frank Novak; Craig Williams
- Home stadium: Fisher Field

1983 NCAA Division I-AA independents football standings
	Conf.			Overall
Team	W	L	T	W		L		T
No. 3 Holy Cross ^		–		9	–	1	–	1
No. 17 Tennessee State		–		8	–	2	–	1
No. 7 Colgate ^		–		8	–	3	–	0
Lehigh		–		8	–	3	–	0
Lafayette		–		6	–	4	–	0
Northeastern		–		6	–	4	–	1
Southeastern Louisiana		–		6	–	5	–	0
William & Mary		–		6	–	5	–	0
Nicholls State		–		5	–	6	–	0
Bucknell		–		4	–	5	–	1
Delaware		–		4	–	7	–	0
Northwestern State		–		4	–	7	–	0
James Madison		–		3	–	8	–	0
Richmond		–		3	–	8	–	0
Western Kentucky		–		2	–	8	–	1
^ – NCAA Division I-AA playoff participant; Rankings from NCAA Division I-AA Football Committee poll

The 1983 Lafayette Leopards football team was an American football team that represented Lafayette College as an independent during the 1983 NCAA Division I-AA football season. In their third year under head coach Bill Russo, the Leopards compiled a 6–5 record. Rich Doverspike, Frank Novak and Craig Williams were the team captains. Starting the season with a four-game win streak, the Leopards made it into the NCAA Division I-AA rankings in the middle of the campaign, but were unranked by season's end. Lafayette played home games at Fisher Field on College Hill in Easton, Pennsylvania.

== Schedule ==
Date	Opponent	Rank	Site	Result	Attendance	Source
September 10	East Stroudsburg		Fisher Field; Easton, PA	W 20–14	7,500	
September 17	at Davidson		Richardson Stadium; Davidson, NC	W 35–12	2,600	
September 24	Columbia	No. 17	Fisher Field; Easton, PA	W 34–29	10,750	
October 1	Bucknell^{†}	No. 15	Fisher Field; Easton, PA	W 33–3	9,200	
October 8	Maine	No. 12	Fisher Field; Easton, PA	L 38–39	6,800	
October 15	at Penn	No. 17	Franklin Field; Philadelphia, PA	L 20–28	6,038	
October 22	at James Madison		Madison Stadium; Harrisonburg, VA	W 31–14	12,800	
October 29	Colgate		Fisher Field; Easton, PA	L 7–21	10,700	
November 5	at Princeton		Palmer Stadium; Princeton, NJ	L 33–41	10,117	
November 12	Kutztown		Fisher Field; Easton, PA	W 28–13		
November 19	at Lehigh		Taylor Stadium; Bethlehem, PA (The Rivalry)	L 14–22	19,000	
^{†}Homecoming; Rankings from NCAA Division I-AA Football Committee Poll released prior to the game
