= 1983 James Madison Dukes football team =

American college football season

1983 James Madison Dukes football
- Conference: Independent
- Record: 3–8
- Head coach: Challace McMillin (12th season)
- Home stadium: Madison Stadium

1983 NCAA Division I-AA independents football standings
	Conf.			Overall
Team	W	L	T	W		L		T
No. 3 Holy Cross ^		–		9	–	1	–	1
No. 17 Tennessee State		–		8	–	2	–	1
No. 7 Colgate ^		–		8	–	3	–	0
Lehigh		–		8	–	3	–	0
Lafayette		–		6	–	4	–	0
Northeastern		–		6	–	4	–	1
Southeastern Louisiana		–		6	–	5	–	0
William & Mary		–		6	–	5	–	0
Nicholls State		–		5	–	6	–	0
Bucknell		–		4	–	5	–	1
Delaware		–		4	–	7	–	0
Northwestern State		–		4	–	7	–	0
James Madison		–		3	–	8	–	0
Richmond		–		3	–	8	–	0
Western Kentucky		–		2	–	8	–	1
^ – NCAA Division I-AA playoff participant; Rankings from NCAA Division I-AA Football Committee poll

The 1983 James Madison Dukes football team was an American football team that represented James Madison University during the 1983 NCAA Division I-AA football season as an independent. In their twelfth year under head coach Challace McMillin, the team compiled an 3–8 record.

== Schedule ==
Date	Opponent	Rank	Site	Result	Attendance	Source
September 10	at Appalachian State		Conrad Stadium; Boone, NC	W 24–20		
September 17	at Virginia		Scott Stadium; Charlottesville, VA	L 14–21	31,984	
September 24	Liberty Baptist	No. T–20	JMU Stadium; Harrisonburg, VA	W 44–35	6,000	
October 1	Davidson		JMU Stadium; Harrisonburg, VA	W 50–0	14,000	
October 8	at Delaware State		Alumni Stadium; Dover, DE	L 28–38		
October 15	at William & Mary		Cary Field; Williamsburg, VA (rivalry)	L 21–24	12,100	
October 22	Lafayette		JMU Stadium; Harrisonburg, VA	L 14–31	12,800	
October 29	Delaware		JMU Stadium; Harrisonburg, VA	L 23–26	9,200	
November 5	at Richmond		City Stadium; Richmond, VA (rivalry)	L 0–32		
November 12	at Shippensburg		Seth Grove Stadium; Shippensburg, PA	L 9–29		
November 19	Towson State		JMU Stadium; Harrisonburg, VA	L 3–10	5,800	
Rankings from NCAA Division I-AA Football Committee Poll released prior to the game
