= 1983 Rhode Island Rams football team =

American college football season

1983 Rhode Island Rams football
- Conference: Yankee Conference
- Record: 6–4 (2–3 Yankee)
- Head coach: Bob Griffin (8th season)
- Offensive coordinator: Niles Nelson (3rd season)
- Defensive coordinator: Pete Adrian (8th season)
- Home stadium: Meade Stadium

1983 Yankee Conference football standings
| | Conf. | | | | | Overall |
| Team | W | | L | | T | W | | L | | T |
|---|---|---|---|---|---|---|---|---|---|---|
| No. T–13 Boston University +^ | 4 | – | 1 | – | 0 | 9 | – | 4 | – | 0 |
| Connecticut + | 4 | – | 1 | – | 0 | 5 | – | 6 | – | 0 |
| No. 20 New Hampshire | 3 | – | 2 | – | 0 | 7 | – | 3 | – | 0 |
| Rhode Island | 2 | – | 3 | – | 0 | 6 | – | 4 | – | 0 |
| UMass | 2 | – | 3 | – | 0 | 3 | – | 8 | – | 0 |
| Maine | 0 | – | 5 | – | 0 | 4 | – | 6 | – | 0 |
+ – Conference co-champions; ^ – NCAA Division I-AA playoff participant; Rankings from NCAA Division I-AA Football Committee poll

The 1983 Rhode Island Rams football team was an American football team that represented the University of Rhode Island in the Yankee Conference during the 1983 NCAA Division I-AA football season. In their eighth season under head coach Bob Griffin, the Rams compiled a 6–4 record (2–3 against conference opponents) and tied for fourth out of six teams in the conference.

== Schedule ==
| Date | Opponent | Site | Result | Attendance | Source |
|---|---|---|---|---|---|
| September 3 | at Ball State* | Ball State Stadium; Muncie, IN | L 26–42 | 5,695 | |
| September 17 | Maine | Meade Stadium; Kingston, RI | W 24–16 | 8,456 | |
| September 24 | at Brown* | Brown Stadium; Providence, RI (rivalry) | W 30–16 | 13,700 | |
| October 1 | at UMass | Alumni Stadium; Hadley, MA | W 13–3 | 6,831 | |
| October 8 | Northeastern* | Meade Stadium; Kingston, RI | W 30–10 | 12,211 | |
| October 15 | at Boston University | Nickerson Field; Boston, MA | L 22–24 | 7,343 | |
| October 22 | Southern Connecticut* | Meade Stadium; Kingston, RI | W 17–7 | 9,841 | |
| October 29 | New Hampshire | Meade Stadium; Kingston, RI | L 13–14 | 5,890 | |
| November 5 | Delaware* | Meade Stadium; Kingston, RI | W 19–9 | 5,307 | |
| November 12 | Connecticut | Meade Stadium; Kingston, RI (rivalry) | L 17–18 | 6,764 | |
*Non-conference game
