= 1983 Delaware State Hornets football team =

American college football season

1983 Delaware State Hornets football
- Conference: Mid-Eastern Athletic Conference
- Record: 7–3–1 (3–1 MEAC)
- Head coach: Joe Purzycki (3rd season)
- Defensive coordinator: Bill Collick (3rd season)
- Home stadium: Alumni Stadium

1983 Mid-Eastern Athletic Conference football standings
	Conf.					Overall
Team	W		L		T	W		L		T
No. 18 South Carolina State $	4	–	0	–	0	7	–	3	–	0
Delaware State	3	–	1	–	0	7	–	3	–	1
Bethune–Cookman	1	–	3	–	0	4	–	4	–	1
North Carolina A&T	1	–	3	–	0	3	–	7	–	1
Howard	1	–	3	–	0	1	–	9	–	0
Florida A&M	0	–	0	–	0	7	–	4	–	0
$ – Conference champion; ^ – NCAA Division I-AA playoff participant; Florida A&M games did not count as conference games; Rankings from NCAA Division I-AA Football Committee poll

The 1983 Delaware State Hornets football team represented Delaware State College (now known as Delaware State University) as a member of the Mid-Eastern Athletic Conference (MEAC) during the 1983 NCAA Division I-AA football season. Led by third-year head coach Joe Purzycki, the Hornets compiled an overall record of 7–3–1, with a mark of 3–1 in conference play, and finished second in the MEAC.

== Schedule ==
Date	Opponent	Rank	Site	Result	Attendance	Source
September 10	at South Carolina State		State College Stadium; Orangeburg, SC	L 17–24	9,250	
September 17	at Florida A&M		Bragg Memorial Stadium; Tallahassee, FL	W 36–34	6,703	
September 24	District of Columbia*		Alumni Stadium; Dover, DE	W 56–6		
October 1	Bethune–Cookman		Alumni Stadium; Dover, DE	W 23–16		
October 8	James Madison*		Alumni Stadium; Dover, DE	W 38–28		
October 15	North Carolina A&T		Alumni Stadium; Dover, DE	W 26–7	7,000	
October 22	at Liberty Baptist*	No. 15	City Stadium; Lynchburg, VA	W 48–24	850	
October 29	Towson State*	No. T–12	Alumni Stadium; Dover, DE	L 15–23		
November 5	at Central State (OH)*	No. 17	McPherson Stadium; Wilberforce, OH	L 26–49	4,500	
November 12	at Northeastern*		Parsons Field; Brookline, MA	T 21–21	3,030	
November 19	Howard		Alumni Stadium; Dover, DE	W 62–20	6,001	
*Non-conference game; Rankings from NCAA Division I-AA Football Committee poll Poll released prior to the game
