= 1983 NCAA Division I-AA football rankings =

The 1983 NCAA Division I-AA football rankings are from the NCAA Division I-AA football committee. This is for the 1983 season.

== Legend ==
	Increase in ranking
	Decrease in ranking
	Not ranked previous week
(#–#)	Win–loss record
(Italics)	Number of first place votes
т	Tied with team above or below also with this symbol

== NCAA Division I-AA Football Committee poll ==
	Week 1 Sept 20	Week 2 Sept 27	Week 3 Oct 4	Week 4 Oct 11	Week 5 Oct 18	Week 6 Oct 25	Week 7 Nov 1	Week 8 Nov 8	Week 9 Nov 15	Week 10 Nov 22	
1.	South Carolina State (3–0)	South Carolina State (4–0) т	Eastern Kentucky (4–0)	Eastern Kentucky (5–0)	Eastern Kentucky (5–0)	Southern Illinois (8–0) (3)	Southern Illinois (9–0) (3)	Southern Illinois (10–0) (4)	Holy Cross (9–0–1) (3)	Southern Illinois (10–1)	1.
2.	McNeese State (3–0)	Eastern Kentucky (3–0) т	Colgate (4–0)	Southern Illinois (6–0)	Southern Illinois (7–0)	Holy Cross (7–0) (1)	Holy Cross (8–0) (1)	Northeast Louisiana (8–1)	Southern Illinois (10–1) т	Furman (9–1–1)	2.
3.	Eastern Kentucky (2–0)	Colgate (3–0)	Southern Illinois (5–0)	Jackson State (6–0)	Jackson State (7–0)	Eastern Kentucky (5–0–1)	Northeast Louisiana (7–1)	Holy Cross (8–0–1)	Furman (8–1–1) т	Holy Cross (9–1–1)	3.
4.	Colgate (2–0)	Jackson State (4–0)	Jackson State (5–0)	Holy Cross (5–0)	Holy Cross (6–0)	Northeast Louisiana (6–1)	Furman (6–1–1)	Furman (7–1–1)	Eastern Kentucky (7–1–1)	North Texas State (8–3)	4.
5.	Furman (2–1)	Southern Illinois (4–0)	Furman (4–1)	Furman (4–1)	South Carolina State (6–1)	North Texas State (5–2)	Eastern Kentucky (5–1–1) т	Eastern Kentucky (6–1–1)	North Texas State (7–3)	Indiana State (8–3)	5.
6.	Jackson State (3–0)	Furman (3–1)	Holy Cross (4–0)	South Carolina State (5–1)	Northeast Louisiana (5–1)	Jackson State (7–1)	Middle Tennessee (7–1) т	Middle Tennessee (8–1)	Indiana State (8–3)	Eastern Illinois (9–2)	6.
7.	Akron (3–0)	Indiana State (3–0)	South Carolina State (4–1)	Colgate (4–1)	North Texas State (5–2)	Eastern Illinois (7–1)	South Carolina State (6–2) т	South Carolina State (7–2)	Middle Tennessee (8–1) т	Colgate (8–3)	7.
8.	Southern Illinois (3–0)	Idaho State (3–0)	Tennessee State (4–1)	Northeast Louisiana (4–1)	Furman (4–1–1)	Furman (5–1–1)	Tennessee State (6–1–1) т	Jackson State (8–2)	Northeast Louisiana (8–2) т	Eastern Kentucky (7–2–1)	8.
9.	North Texas State (2–1)	Holy Cross (3–0)	Northeast Louisiana (3–1)	Southern (5–0)	Eastern Illinois (6–1) т	Middle Tennessee (6–1)	Idaho State (6–2)	Indiana State (7–3)	Jackson State (8–2)	Western Carolina (8–2–1)	9.
10.	Indiana State (2–1)	Northeast Louisiana (3–1)	Appalachian State (4–1)	North Texas State (4–2)	Idaho State (5–1) т	South Carolina State (6–2)	Jackson State (7–2)	North Texas State (6–3)	Eastern Illinois (9–2)	Grambling State (7–1–2)	10.
11.	Idaho (2–0)	McNeese State (3–1)	McNeese State (3–1)	McNeese State (4–1)	Middle Tennessee (5–1)	Nevada (4–3)	Grambling State (5–1–2)	Eastern Illinois (8–2)	Grambling State (7–1–2)	Nevada (7–4)	11.
12.	Holy Cross (2–0)	Akron (3–1)	Lafayette (4–0)	Tennessee State (4–1–1)	Tennessee State (4–1–1)	Delaware State (6–1) т	North Texas State (5–3)	Tennessee State (7–1–1)	Colgate (7–3)	Idaho State (8–3)	12.
13.	Idaho State (2–0)	Tennessee State (3–1)	North Texas State (3–2)	Idaho State (4–1)	Colgate (4–2)	Tennessee State (5–1–1) т	Eastern Illinois (7–2)	Grambling State (6–1–2)	Western Carolina (7–2–1)	Northeast Louisiana (8–3) т	13.
14.	Northeast Louisiana (2–1)	Appalachian State (3–1)	Grambling State (3–1) т	Eastern Illinois (5–1)	Indiana State (5–2)	Southern (6–1)	Idaho (6–2)	Idaho (7–2)	Nevada (6–4)	Boston University (8–3) т	14.
15.	Grambling State (2–1)	Lafayette (3–0)	Idaho State (3–1) т	Middle Tennessee (4–1)	Delaware State (5–1)	Idaho State (5–2)	Indiana State (6–3)	Colgate (6–3)	Boston University (7–3)	Jackson State (8–3)	15.
16.	Tennessee State (2–1)	North Texas State (2–2)	Southern (4–0) т	Indiana State (4–2)	Nevada (3–3)	Grambling State (4–1–2)	Penn (5–1–1)	Southern (7–2)	South Carolina State (7–3)	Middle Tennessee (8–2)	16.
17.	Lafayette (2–0)	Grambling State (2–1)	Middle Tennessee (4–0)	Lafayette (4–1)	Weber State (5–1)	Rhode Island (5–2) т	Delaware State (6–2)	Boston University (6–3)	Idaho State (7–3)	Tennessee State (8–2–1)	17.
18.	Appalachian State (2–1)	Nicholls State (2–1)	Indiana State (3–2)	Appalachian State (4–2)	McNeese State (4–2) т	Chattanooga (5–2) т	Colgate (5–3) т	Western Carolina (6–2–1)	Tennessee State (7–2–1)	South Carolina State (7–3)	18.
19.	Boston University (1–1)	Boston University (2–1)	Eastern Illinois (4–1) т	Idaho (4–1)	Southern (5–1) т	Idaho (5–2)	Southern (6–2) т	Idaho State (6–3)	New Hampshire (7–3) т	Mississippi Valley State (7–2–1)	19.
20.	Southern (2–0) т	Idaho (2–1) т	Idaho (3–1) т	Grambling State (3–1–1)	Boston University (4–2)	Indiana State (5–3)	Southeastern Louisiana (6–3) т	Southeastern Louisiana (6–3)	Mississippi Valley State (7–2–1) т	New Hampshire (7–3)	20.
21.	James Madison (1–1) т	Southern (3–0) т					Western Carolina (5–2–1) т				21.
	Week 1 Sept 20	Week 2 Sept 27	Week 3 Oct 4	Week 4 Oct 11	Week 5 Oct 18	Week 6 Oct 25	Week 7 Nov 1	Week 8 Nov 8	Week 9 Nov 15	Week 10 Nov 22	
		Dropped: 20 James Madison	Dropped: 12 Akron; 18 Nicholls State; 19 Boston University	None	Dropped: 17 Lafayette; 18 Appalachian State; 19 Idaho; 20 Grambling State	Dropped: 13 Colgate; 17 Weber State; 18 McNeese State; 20 Boston University	Dropped: 11 Nevada; 17 Rhode Island; 18 Chattanooga	Dropped: 16 Penn; 17 Delaware State	Dropped: 14 Idaho; 16 Southern; 20 Southeastern Louisiana	None	
